= U.S. Route 101 in California =

U.S. Highway in California

U.S. Route 101
- US 101 highlighted in red

Route information
- Maintained by Caltrans
- Length: 808.111 mi (1,300.529 km) Portions of US 101 relinquished to or otherwise maintained by local or other governments are not included in the length
- Existed: November 11, 1926–present
- Tourist routes: Gaviota Coast; Redwood Highway through Del Norte Coast Redwoods State Park
- Restrictions: STAA trucks are prohibited through Richardson Grove State Park

Major junctions
- South end: I-5 / I-10 / SR 60 in Los Angeles
- SR 110 in Los Angeles; SR 134 / SR 170 in North Hollywood; I-405 in Sherman Oaks; SR 58 in Santa Margarita; I-280 / I-680 in San Jose; I-280 in San Francisco; I-80 in San Francisco; I-580 in San Rafael; SR 299 in Arcata; US 199 near Crescent City
- North end: US 101 at the Oregon state line near Brookings, Oregon

Location
- Country: United States
- State: California
- Counties: Los Angeles, Ventura, Santa Barbara, San Luis Obispo, Monterey, San Benito, Santa Clara, San Mateo, San Francisco, Marin, Sonoma, Mendocino, Humboldt, Del Norte

Highway system
- United States Numbered Highway System; List; Special; Divided; State highways in California; Interstate; US; State; Scenic; History; Pre‑1964; Unconstructed; Deleted; Freeways
← SR 100	→ SR 102

U.S. Route 101 (US 101) is a north–south United States Numbered Highway that runs between Los Angeles, California, and Tumwater, Washington. U.S. Route 101 in California covers approximately 808 miles (1,300 km) between the East Los Angeles Interchange and the Oregon border, making it the longest numbered route in California's highway network.

US 101 is a critical freeway in Greater Los Angeles and the San Francisco Bay Area; it is also a communal highway in the Central and North coasts, where it connects cities such as Santa Barbara, San Luis Obispo, Salinas, and Eureka. The Los Angeles portion of US 101 is one of the most congested freeways in the U.S. based on multiple studies. In the Central Coast, US 101 is a mix of freeway and expressway, while the North Coast segment is mostly a two-lane road with pockets of controlled-access configurations. The majority of the route is maintained by the California Department of Transportation (Caltrans).

US 101 was created in 1926, its route taking over or sharing paths with El Camino Real, Redwood Highway, and State Legislative Routes 1 and 2. US 101 originally continued south from Los Angeles, through Orange County and San Diego to the Mexican border, but this segment was switched to Interstate 5 (I‑5) in 1964. Beginning in the 1930s, numerous US 101 segments were replaced or relocated, often to bypass smaller cities. In the 1940s and 1950s, many segments were upgraded to freeway standards, particularly in Southern California, San Jose, and along the San Francisco Peninsula. However, freeway upgrades were curtailed in the 1960s, and while a few sections have been upgraded since then, segments now are more commonly improved without being fully upgraded to freeway standards. In 2024, the Wallis Annenberg Wildlife Crossing, the world's largest wildlife crossing, began construction across US 101 in Ventura County. Proposed improvements yet to be implemented include two freeway caps in Los Angeles, trucking upgrades through Richardson Grove State Park, a 6,000-foot (1,800 m) tunnel in Del Norte County, and the addition of high-occupancy lanes in several areas.

US 101 and many of its features are known by various names. California residents generally refer to the route as "101" or "the 101" (pronounced "one-oh-one"), while segments in Los Angeles are variously named Santa Ana Freeway, Hollywood Freeway, and Ventura Freeway, and segments in the Bay Area are named South Valley Freeway, Bayshore Freeway, and Central Freeway. US 101 south of the Bay Area has been dedicated as El Camino Real, north of the Golden Gate Bridge as Redwood Highway, and the entire route is named both Blue Star Memorial Highway and Coast Highway. Several memorial and tourist designations have been applied to sections of the route. Segments of US 101 that run concurrently with California State Route 1 (SR 1) are also known as Pacific Coast Highway, sharing the name of that route.

== Route description ==
US 101 runs for 808 miles (1,300 km) in California, making it the longest numbered route in the state. It is named Route 101 in Section 401 of the California Streets and Highways Code and defined as:

Route 101 is from:

(a) Route 5 near Seventh Street in Los Angeles to Route 1, Funston approach, and, subject to Section 72.1, the approach to the Golden Gate Bridge in the Presidio of San Francisco via Santa Barbara, San Luis Obispo, and Salinas.

(b) A point in Marin County opposite San Francisco to the Oregon state line via Crescent City.

The definition purposely omits the segment crossing the Golden Gate Bridge, as it is maintained by the Golden Gate Bridge, Highway and Transportation District and is not part of the state highway system. Despite this, U.S. Route logs from the American Association of State Highway and Transportation Officials (AASHTO) include the bridge as part of US 101, as do most other maps. The bridge, along with the rest of US 101, is also part of the National Highway System.

US 101 is part of the California Freeway and Expressway System, and portions of it are eligible for inclusion in the State Scenic Highway System. It is officially designated a scenic highway between Goleta and Las Cruces in Santa Barbara County and through Del Norte Coast Redwoods State Park in Del Norte County.

=== Southern California ===
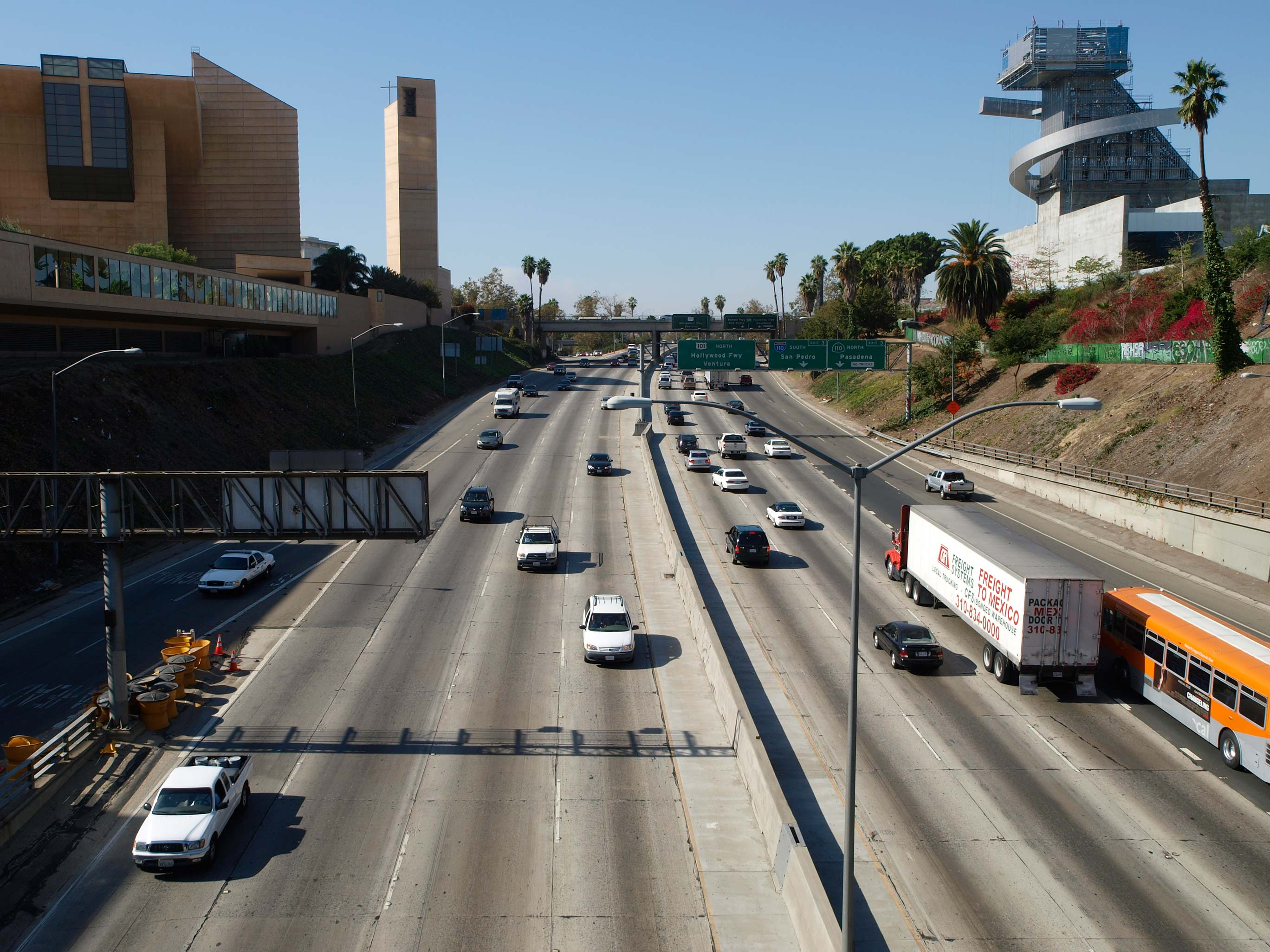
US 101 through downtown Los Angeles

US 101 begins in Boyle Heights at the East Los Angeles Interchange, a major freeway junction that includes I‑5, I‑10, and SR 60. The six-lane portion of the route is the northerly continuation of the Santa Ana Freeway, inheriting that name from I‑5. After two miles (3.2 km), US 101 turns west at the San Bernardino Split, a three-way junction with the San Bernardino Freeway that transitions into I‑10 to the east. US 101 travels across the Los Angeles River before passing Los Angeles Union Station.

Proceeding in a generally northwestern direction, US 101 travels through downtown Los Angeles via the Downtown Slot between the Los Angeles Civic Center and El Pueblo de Los Ángeles, then intersects with SR 110 at the Four Level Interchange. Starting here, US 101 is named Hollywood Freeway. It bisects Echo Park, Silver Lake, Los Feliz, and Hollywood, passing Echo Park Lake, the Hollywood Boulevard Commercial and Entertainment District, and the Hollywood Bowl in the process. SR 2 has a short concurrency with the freeway within the area. North of Hollywood, US 101 traverses the Santa Monica Mountains via the Cahuenga Pass before entering the San Fernando Valley. It then passes Universal Studios Hollywood, after which it turns westward at the Hollywood Split, where it supersedes SR 134 on the Ventura Freeway while the Hollywood Freeway continues north as SR 170.

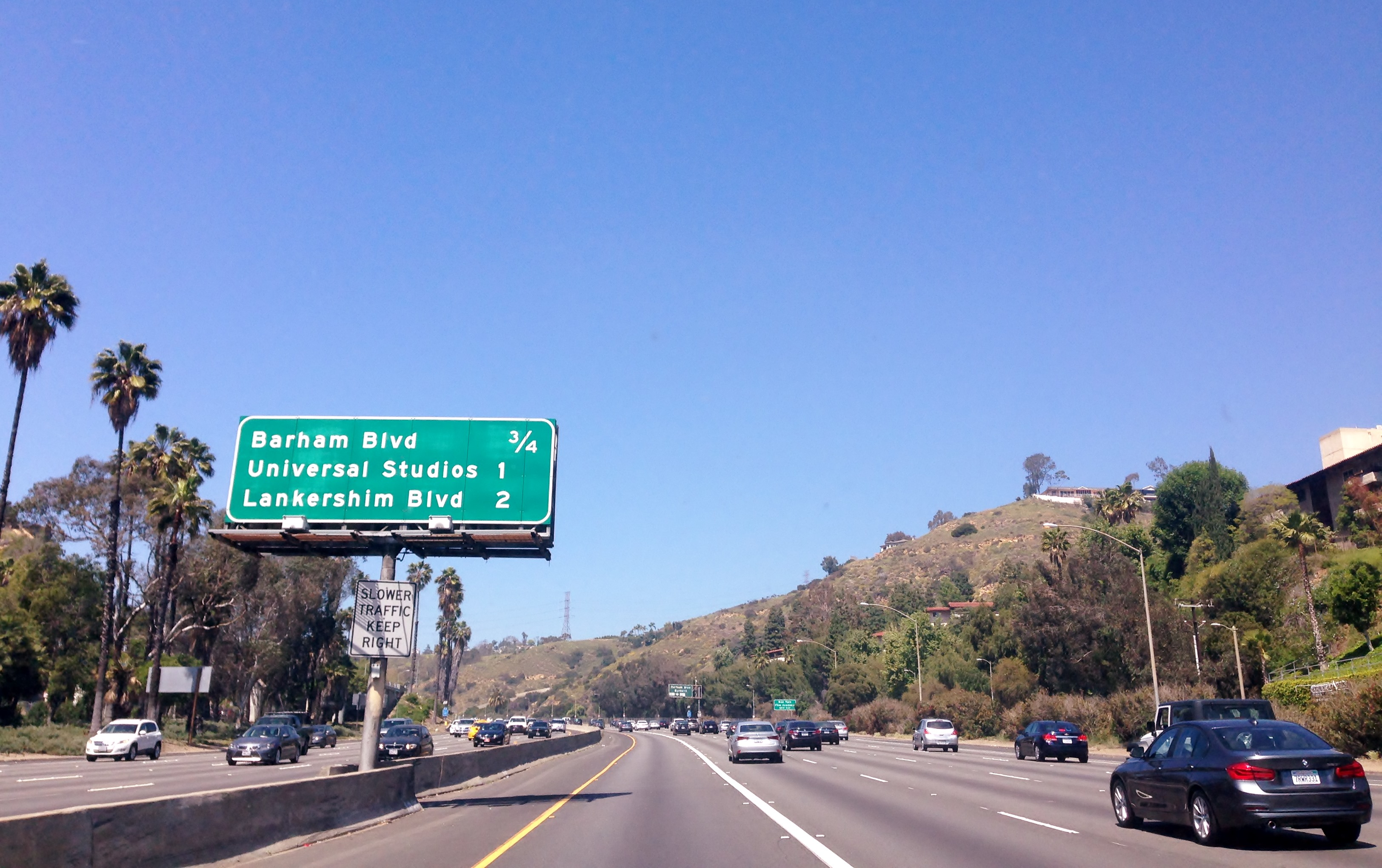
Cahuenga Pass through the Santa Monica Mountains

From the Hollywood Split, US 101 runs east–west despite its north–south designation. Because of this, the same freeway entrance can be signed as US 101 North and US 101 West or US 101 South and US 101 East; this is most common in the San Fernando Valley where local signage does not match Caltrans' statewide designation. Along this segment, US 101 intersects with I‑405 in Sherman Oaks and SR 27 in Woodland Hills. In Calabasas, US 101 changes from heavily urbanized to a more rural character as it enters the Conejo Valley, where it transitions from Los Angeles County into Ventura County. In Thousand Oaks, US 101 and SR 23 run concurrently for about 2.5 miles (4.0 km), between Westlake Boulevard and a three-way interchange with the Moorpark Freeway.

Continuing westward, US 101 climbs the Conejo Grade on a 7% incline before descending into the Oxnard Plain, where it has interchanges with SR 34 and SR 232 in Camarillo and Oxnard, respectively. Likewise in the latter city, SR 1 runs concurrently with US 101. (Note: Although maps, including Google Maps, and state route logs show a concurrency with US 101 and SR 1, there is no signage indicating this.) Upon crossing the Santa Clara River, the highway enters Ventura, where it intersects with SR 126 and SR 33 on separate junctions.

=== Central Coast ===
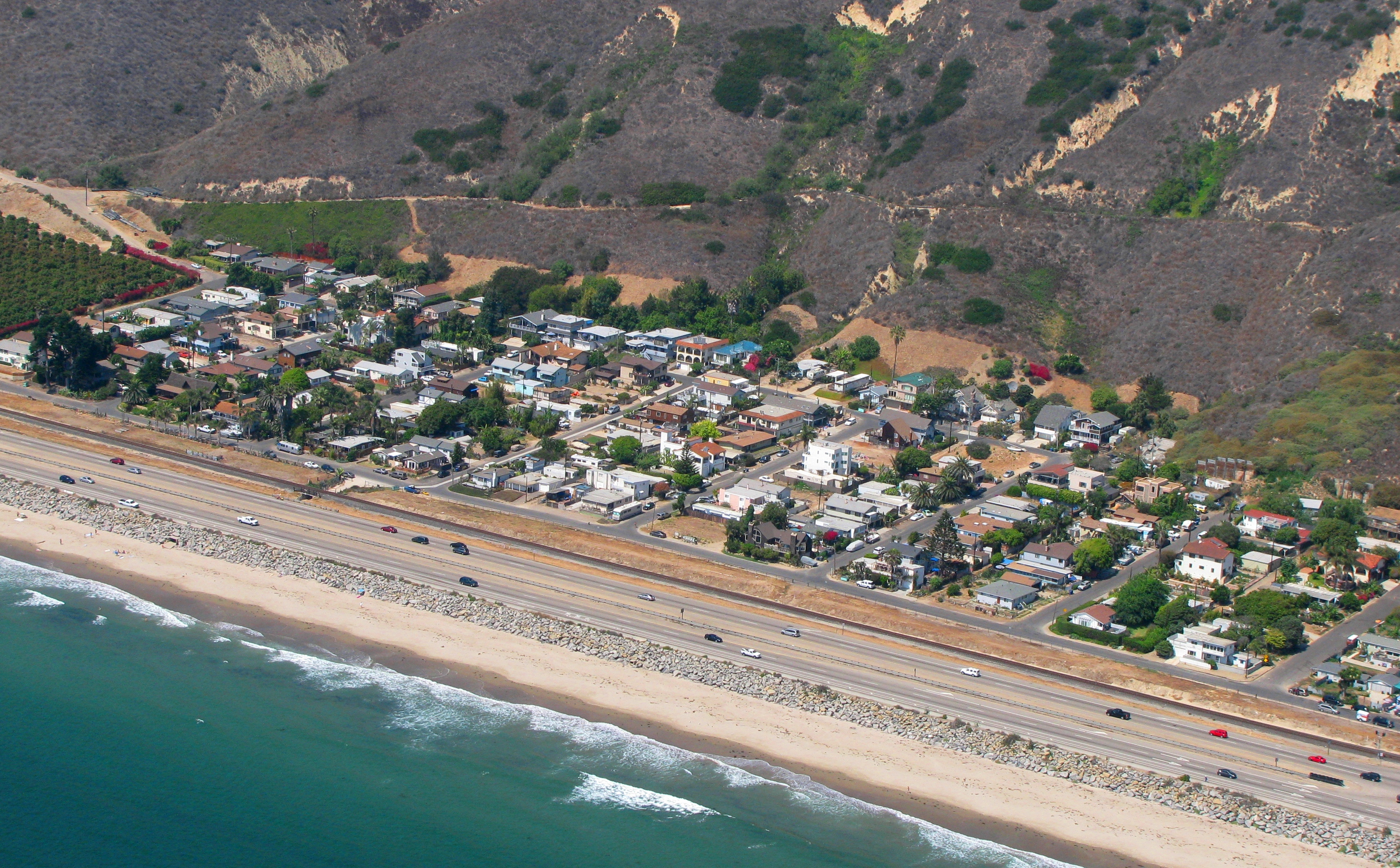
US 101 and SR 1 through La Conchita

The US 101/SR 1 duplex crosses the Ventura River at Emma Wood State Beach, at which point it borders the Pacific Coast for 12 miles (19 km) until Rincon Point; of this, the two routes run alongside rather than concurrent for 7.5 miles (12.1 km), with the non-concurrent section of SR 1 routed on Rincon Parkway. The highway also passes through Faria, Mussel Shoals, and La Conchita along this stretch. After reaching Santa Barbara County, it intersects with SR 150—at this point, the Ventura Freeway name ends. US 101/SR 1 continues through Carpinteria, then returns to the coast for two miles (3.2 km), passing through Summerland before entering Santa Barbara.

US 101/SR 1 bisects the entire length of Santa Barbara, with an interchange at SR 154. In Goleta, the highway has a junction with SR 217 that connects to University of California, Santa Barbara. West of Goleta, the routes narrow from six lanes to four and switch from freeway to expressway, (Note: In California, the term "expressway" describes a divided highway with few cross-traffic points and no grade separations at intersections.) then straddle a 19-mile (31 km) stretch of the Gaviota Coast, again often directly overlooking the shore.

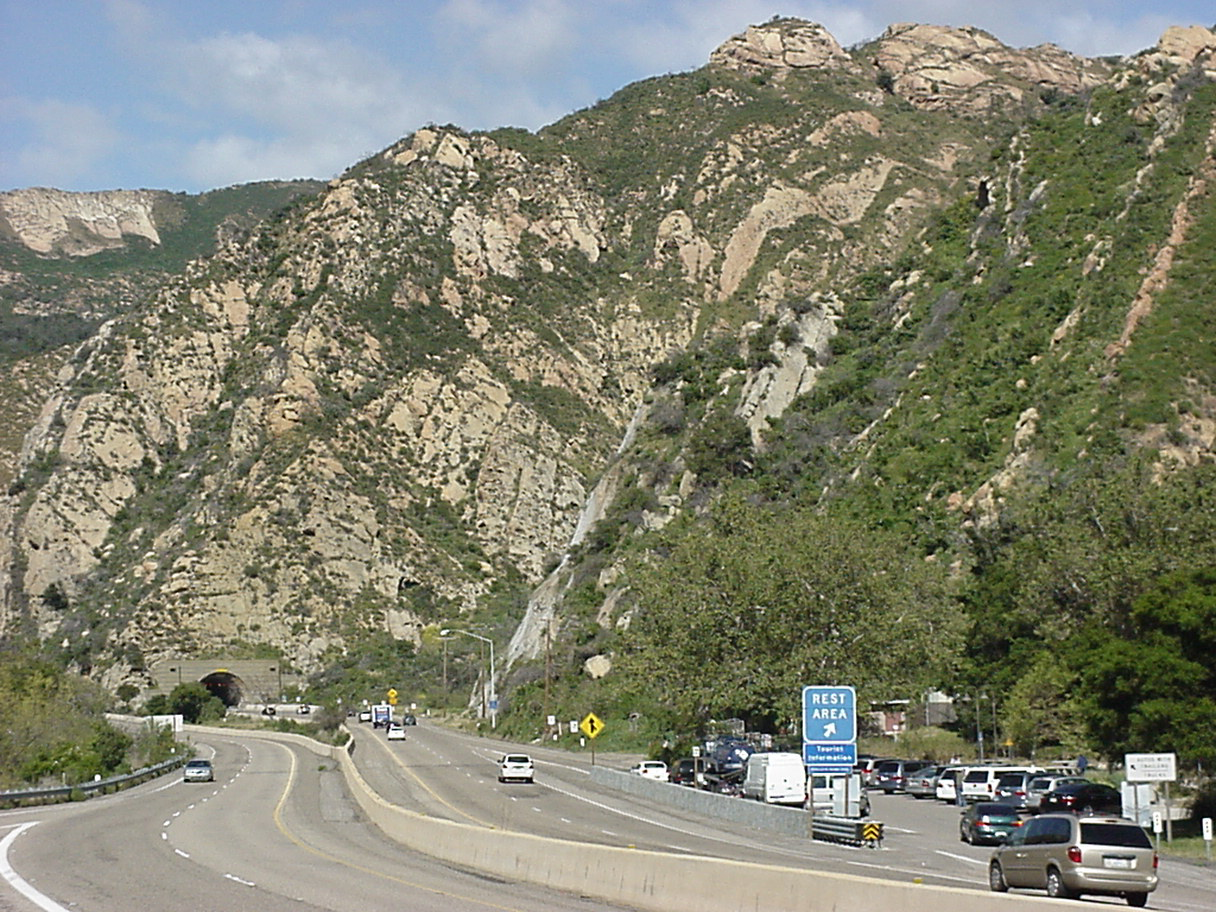
Gaviota Pass through the Santa Ynez Mountains

At Gaviota, the highway curves sharply north and reverts to its original north–south orientation. It heads inland across the Santa Ynez Mountains via the Gaviota Pass, where northbound lanes pass through the Gaviota Tunnel—no tunnel exists in the southbound direction. About 1.5 miles (2.4 km) north of the Gaviota Tunnel, SR 1 splits from US 101 to resume its role as California's primary coastal highway. Throughout the rest of the Central Coast, US 101 switches between freeway and expressway status, but despite occasional cross-traffic it has unimpeded traffic, as there are no stop signs or traffic signals until San Francisco.

North of the US 101/SR 1 split, US 101 reaches Buellton, where it intersects with SR 246. North of Buellton, US 101 intersects SR 154 again, and in Los Alamos, it intersects SR 135. In Orcutt, US 101 and SR 166 run concurrently for three miles (4.8 km) until north of Santa Maria, where US 101 again intersects with SR 135. Vineyards surround US 101 in much of this area.

In San Luis Obispo County, US 101 passes through Nipomo, then intersects with SR 227 in Arroyo Grande. US 101 and SR 1 form another concurrency in Pismo Beach. Thereafter, the highway turns inland to San Luis Obispo, where US 101 reconnects with SR 227, and SR 1 splits off again. North of San Luis Obispo, US 101 ascends the Santa Lucia Range on a 7% incline via the Cuesta Grade, cresting at 1,522 feet (464 m) before descending north of the range. After the grade, US 101 has an interchange with SR 58 near Santa Margarita, and another with SR 41 in Atascadero. US 101 next passes through Templeton, and upon exiting, it runs concurrent with SR 46 for about three miles (4.8 km) until Paso Robles. US 101 continues north through San Miguel, where it enters Monterey County inside Camp Roberts.

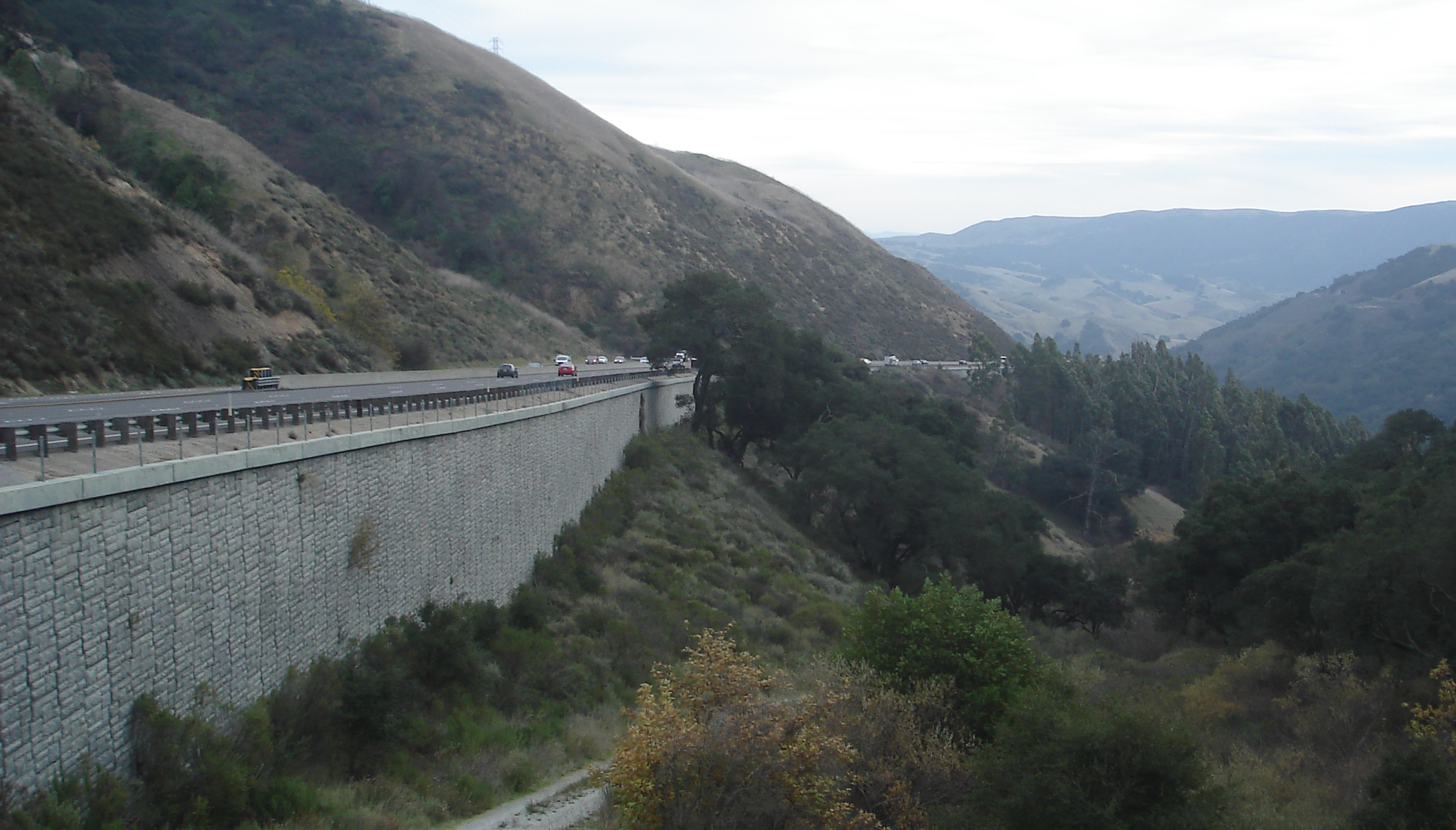
Cuesta Grade southbound toward San Luis Obispo

North of Camp Roberts, US 101 passes the San Ardo Oil Field about five miles (8.0 km) south of San Ardo. Between San Lucas and King City, US 101 crosses the Salinas River three times and also intersects SR 198. US 101 then enters the Salinas Valley, known as America's Salad Bowl, where it travels through Greenfield, Soledad, Gonzales, Chualar, and Spence. US 101 then enters Salinas, where it has junctions with SR 68 and SR 183. North of Salinas, US 101 and SR 156 run concurrently for approximately eight miles (13 km). Within San Benito County, SR 156 splits off near San Juan Bautista, after which US 101 intersects with SR 129. US 101 also crosses the San Andreas Fault in this area.

=== San Francisco Bay Area ===
US 101 crosses the Pajaro River watershed into Santa Clara County, San Francisco Bay Area's southernmost county. US 101 then intersects SR 25, then continues north to Gilroy, where it changes from expressway to freeway. US 101 and SR 152 run concurrently for one mile (1.6 km) in this area; after which US 101 passes near San Martin and Morgan Hill in the Santa Clara Valley.

US 101's surroundings become increasingly urbanized as it approaches San Jose, where it intersects with SR 85. US 101 bypasses downtown San Jose to the east, passing through largely residential areas and also intersecting with I‑280 and I‑680 at the Joe Colla Interchange. US 101 then turns northwest as it continues through San Jose and intersects with I‑880, then has a partial junction with SR 87. In Sunnyvale, US 101 intersects with SR 237 and SR 85, the latter for the second time. US 101 continues northwest through the South Bay, passing the Silicon Valley campuses of several major technology corporations, including IBM, Intel, Nvidia, and Google.

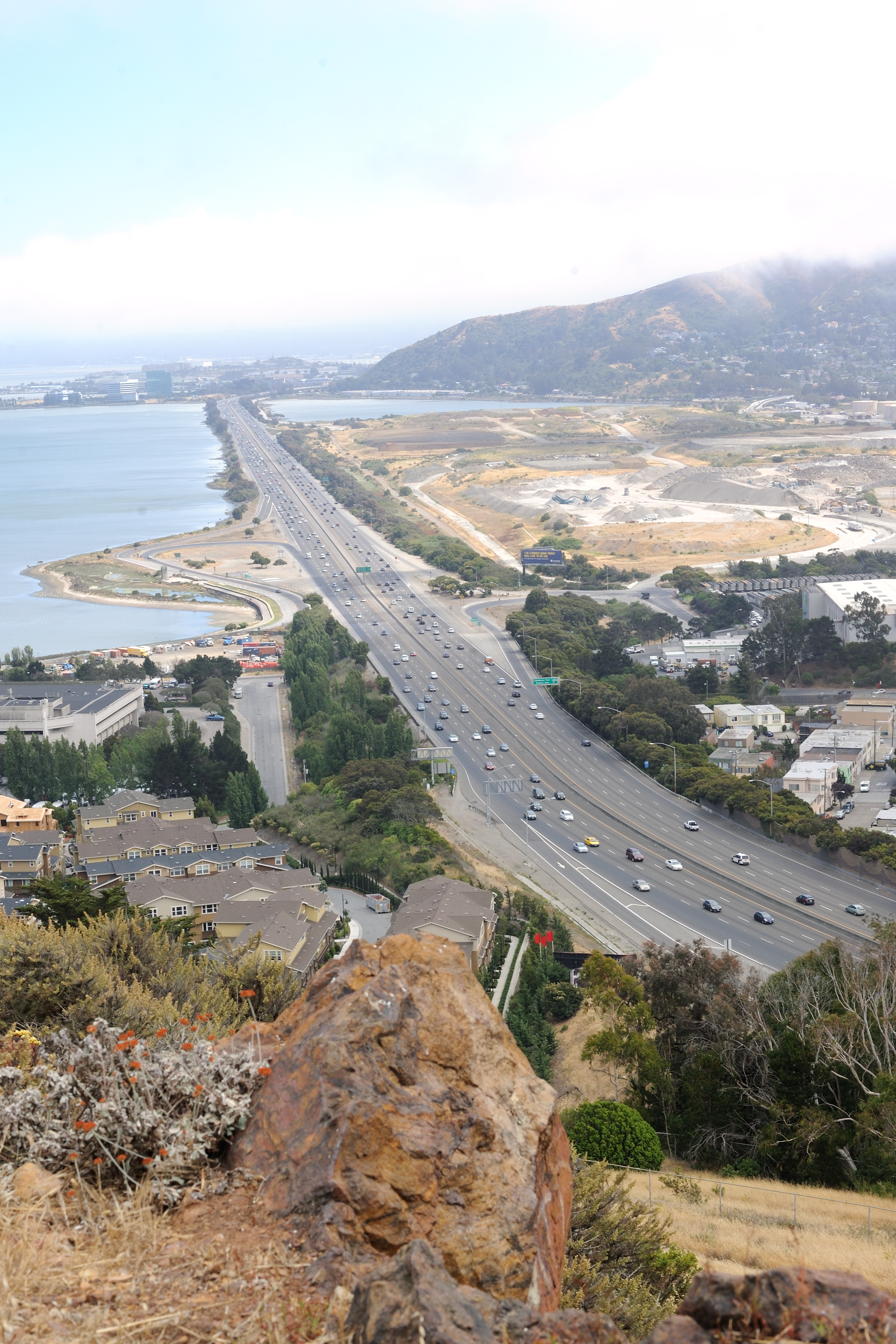
US 101 from Bayview Park in San Francisco

US 101 enters the San Francisco Peninsula at Palo Alto, where it travels along the western edge of the San Francisco Bay. The route enters San Mateo County in East Palo Alto, where it intersects with SR 84, then passes through Redwood City, Belmont, and San Carlos. US 101 intersects with SR 92 in San Mateo, and in San Bruno, it passes San Francisco International Airport, with direct ramp and flyover connections between the freeway and airport terminals. US 101 intersects with I‑380 north of its airport connectors, then traverses the east side of South San Francisco. Here, the scenery briefly becomes more natural as the freeway passes Brisbane east of San Bruno Mountain, at one point traveling on a causeway that separates Brisbane Lagoon from the San Francisco Bay. US 101 also passes Bayview Park, the former location of Candlestick Park, in this area.

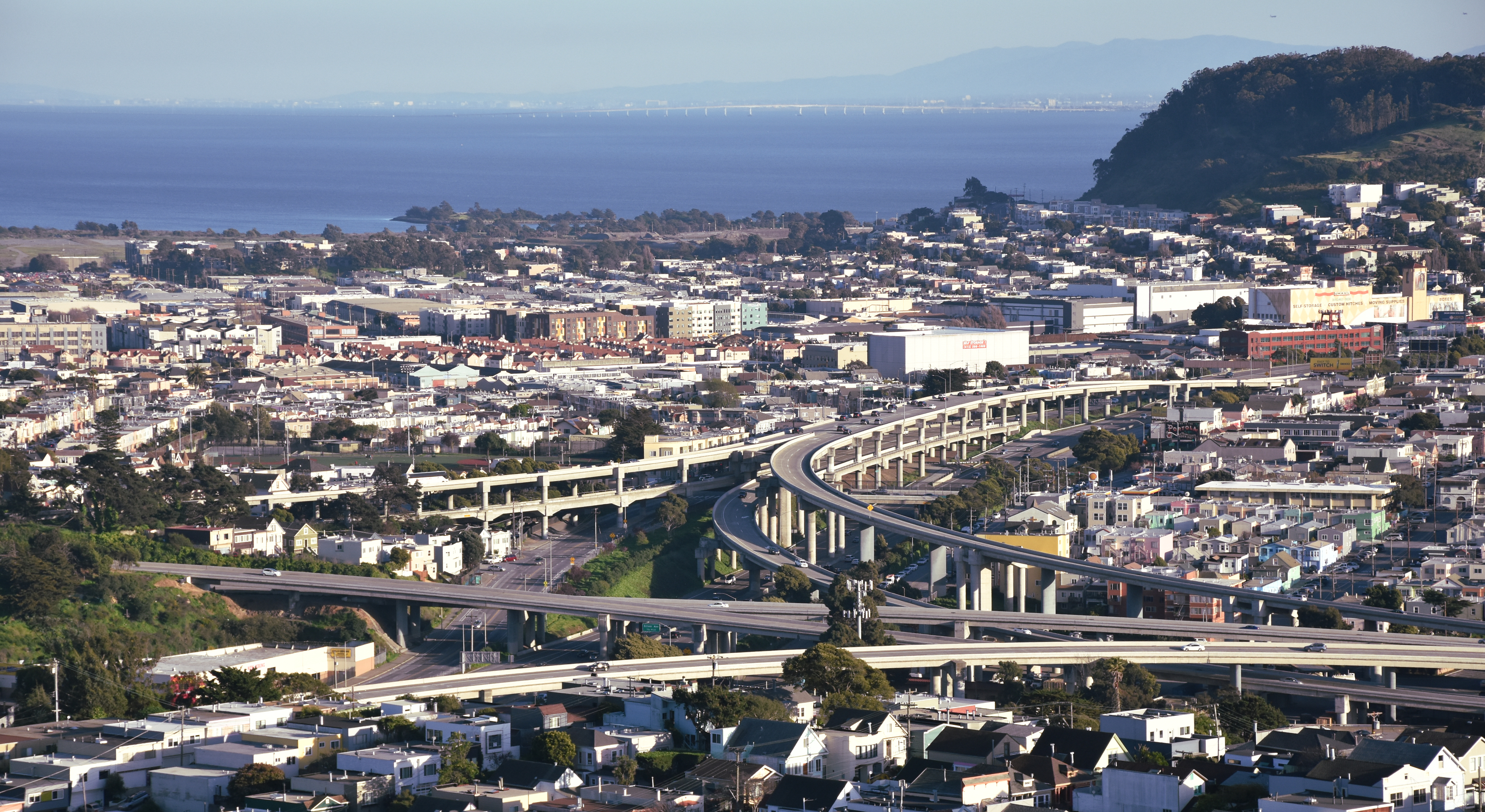
US 101/I‑280 interchange, also known as the Alemany Maze, in San Francisco

US 101 enters the city and county of San Francisco at Bayview Park, after which it again intersects with I‑280, this time via the Alemany Maze. North of this, US 101 traverses a three-way interchange with the western terminus of the San Francisco Skyway, the latter of which is signed as I‑80 but not defined as such. US 101 turns west at the interchange and follows the old Central Freeway viaduct near San Francisco's Civic Center before transitioning to a surface street on Van Ness Avenue. There, San Francisco Municipal Railway (MUNI) bus lanes traverse the middle of the alignment, which passes the rear of San Francisco City Hall. US 101 turns west on Lombard Street, then northwest on Richardson Avenue where it passes the Palace of Fine Arts, after which it continues onto the grade-separated Presidio Parkway. Within the Presidio of San Francisco, US 101 passes through the Main Post and Battery tunnels, then turns northwest as it and SR 1 join near Crissy Field. The shared highway crosses the Golden Gate Bridge.

North of San Francisco, US 101/SR 1 enters Marin County in the North Bay as Redwood Highway. The freeway bypasses Sausalito on the Waldo Grade via the Robin Williams Tunnel, then descends to Richardson Bay, where US 101 and SR 1 split again. US 101 continues north post-split, where it enters Mill Valley and connects with SR 131. US 101 continues through the twin towns of Corte Madera and Larkspur. In San Rafael, it partially intersects with I‑580, travels just east of downtown, and passes the Marin County Civic Center in Santa Venetia. Farther north, US 101 intersects with SR 37 in Novato before traveling through sparsely populated areas alongside Olompali State Historic Park.

North of Olompali, US 101 enters Sonoma County, where vineyards again frequently surround the freeway. US 101 and SR 116 run concurrently between Petaluma and Cotati, after which US 101 continues north through Rohnert Park. In Santa Rosa, US 101 has a junction with SR 12 and passes over Railroad Square via the Robert L. Bishop Memorial Bridge. The freeway then passes through Windsor and crosses the Russian River in Healdsburg. It parallels the river through Alexander Valley, where it traverses the western hills and overlooks the wine-growing valley. US 101 then passes through Geyserville, from which SR 128 follows the freeway until Cloverdale.

=== Northern California ===
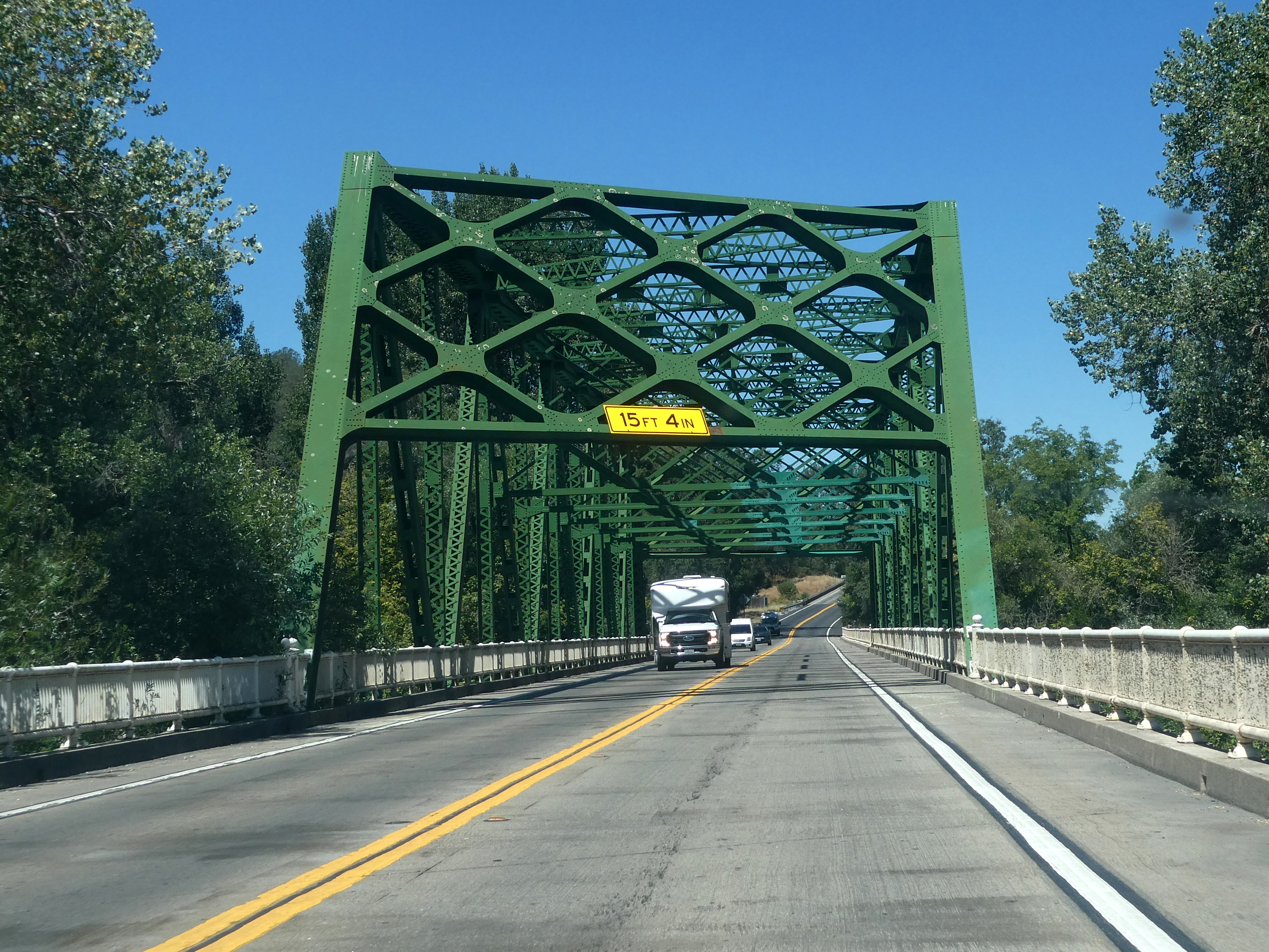
US 101 crossing the Russian River near Hopland

Leaving the Bay Area, US 101 crosses the Russian River about one mile (1.6 km) north of the Mendocino County line. The route then changes to an expressway before flanking the river channel. Inside the canyon, the route passes Frog Woman Rock, a massive rock feature central to local Pomo lore. The route then enters Sanel Valley, where it narrows to a two-lane road and crosses the Russian River once more. In Hopland, US 101 intersects with SR 175.

North of Hopland, US 101 widens to a four-lane freeway as it approaches Ukiah, where it intersects SR 253 and SR 222. In Calpella close to Lake Mendocino, US 101 and SR 20 merge and run concurrently for 15.5 miles (24.9 km), ascending the 1,956-foot (596 m) Ridgewood Summit, US 101's highest elevation in California, in the process. US 101 and SR 20 separate south of Willits, where SR 20 travels through the town while US 101 bypasses it to the east.

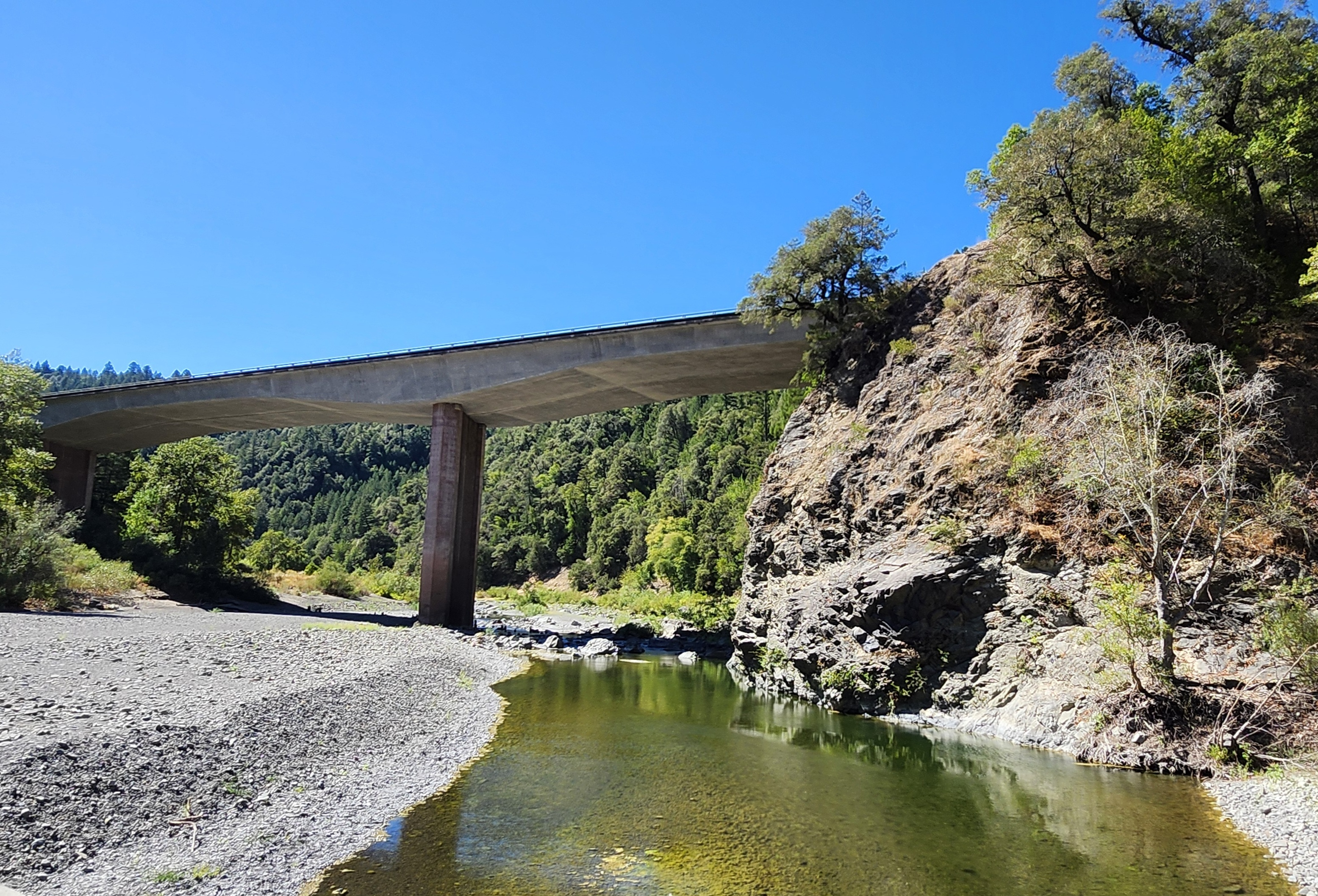
US 101 across the South Fork Eel River near Benbow

US 101 intersects with SR 162 north of Willits before reaching Laytonville inside Long Valley. US 101 traverses the 1,796-foot (547 m) Rattlesnake Summit, after which it follows the South Fork Eel River. In Leggett, US 101 and SR 1 meet for a fourth and final time, this time at an at-grade intersection. US 101 then follows the South Fork Eel River on a series of sharp curves into Piercy, where it crosses the river via the Confusion Hill Bridges and then enters Cooks Valley. SR 271 closely parallels US 101 for two sections of this route: between Cummings and Legget, and Piercy and Cooks Valley; these sections were the old alignment of US 101.

US 101 enters Humboldt County at Cooks Valley, then bisects Richardson Grove State Park, where standard-sized trucks in compliance with the Surface Transportation Assistance Act of 1982 are prohibited. From Benbow, US 101 parallels Avenue of the Giants (a preserved portion of the route's original alignment) for more than 30 miles (48 km), during which both routes travel through Myers Flat, Weott, and Redcrest, while US 101 bypasses Phillipsville, Miranda, and Pepperwood. Both routes also straddle the eastern boundary of Humboldt Redwoods State Park.

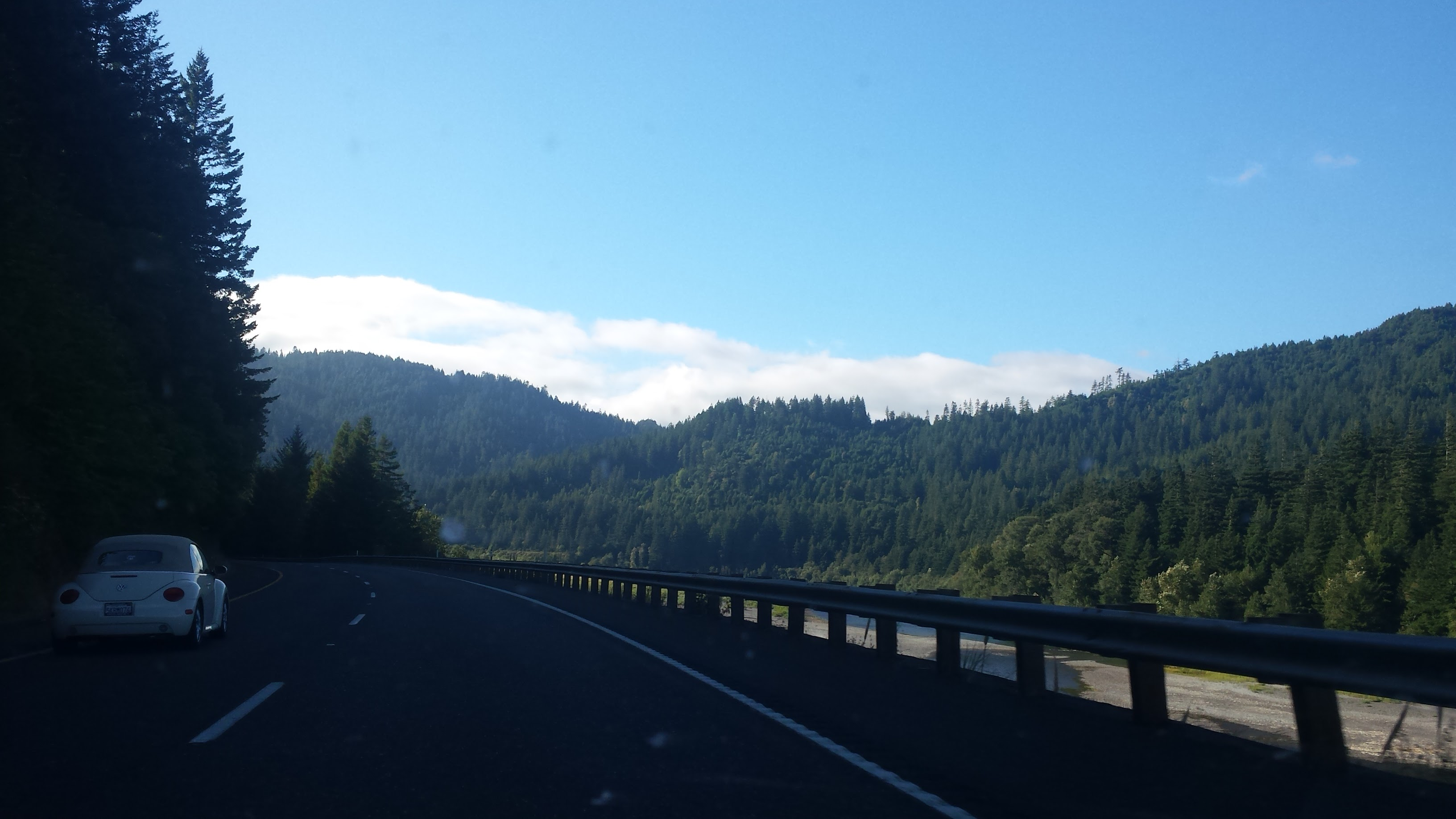
US 101 following the Eel River near Stafford

North of Avenue of the Giants, US 101 crosses the Eel River three times as it follows the river through Stafford, Scotia, and Rio Dell. Beyond Rio Dell, US 101 crosses the Van Duzen River, then intersects with the western terminus of SR 36. US 101 continues north to Fortuna, then passes through Humboldt Bay National Wildlife Refuge, Humboldt Hill, and Fields Landing. Coming into Eureka, US 101 parallels North Bay Channel before transitioning to a surface street. US 101 continues north past Fort Humboldt State Historic Park, then turns east on a one-way couplet through downtown, where it intersects with SR 255. As the couplet ends east of downtown, US 101 becomes an unobstructed highway as it crosses the Freshwater Slough via Eureka Slough Bridge. The route then curves around Arcata Bay, leaving Eureka in the process. It travels north through Arcata, where it intersects with SR 255 again, then intersects with SR 299.

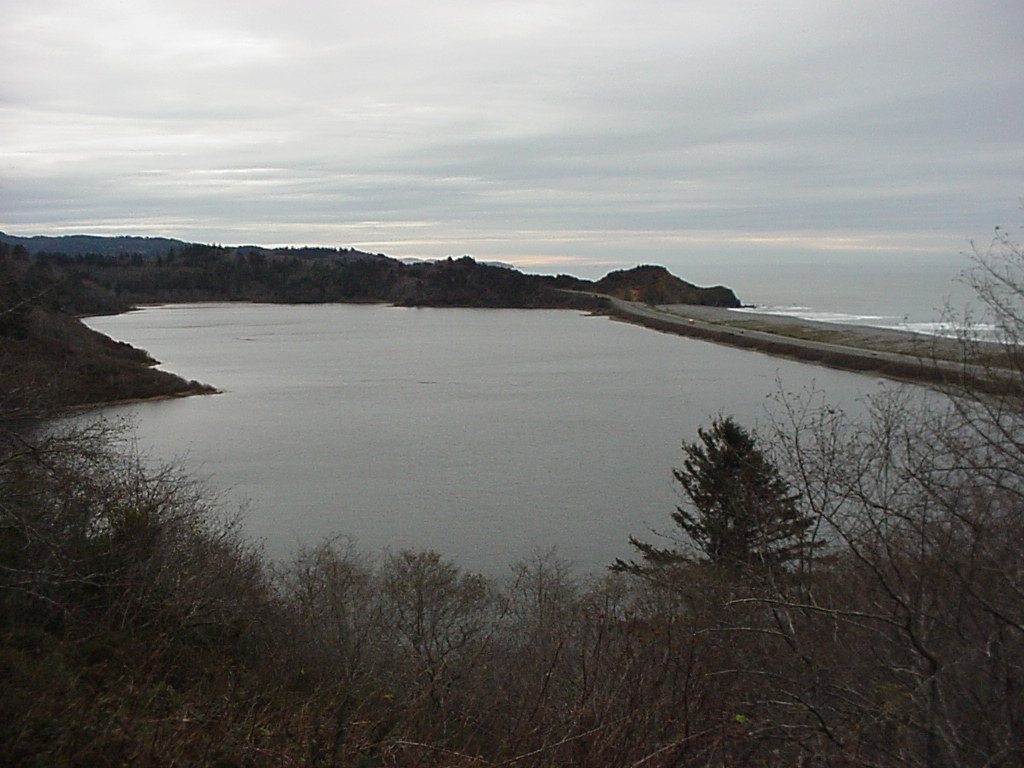
US 101 following the Freshwater Lagoon sand bar

Continuing north, US 101 passes McKinleyville on a bluff north of the Mad River, then crosses Big Lagoon north of Trinidad. Thereafter, US 101 narrows to two lanes and follows a bar between the Freshwater Lagoon and the Pacific Ocean. At Orick, the route turns inland and becomes a 14-mile (23 km) undivided freeway through Redwood National and State Parks east of Prairie Creek Redwoods State Park.

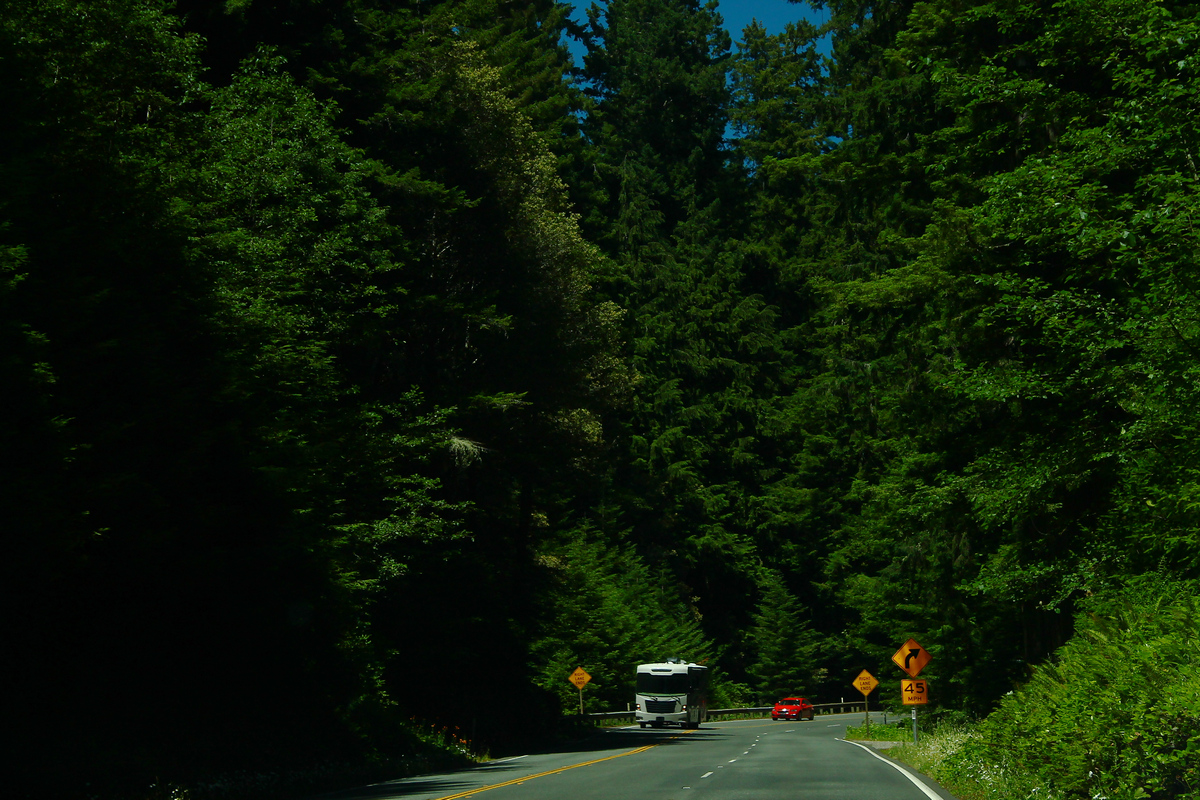
US 101 in Del Norte

US 101 continues north into Del Norte County, where it crosses the Klamath River before entering Klamath. Further north, US 101 traverses Last Chance Grade as it approaches Crescent City, wherein it separates into a one-way couplet for nine blocks. North of Crescent City, US 101 turns northeast and becomes a freeway for three miles (4.8 km). The freeway intersects with the southern terminus of US 199 before continuing northward as a two-lane road through the eastern outlying area of Fort Dick. US 101 then crosses the Smith River and enters the town of the same name. The route then returns to the coast, where it continues on a northerly bearing past Pelican State Beach and enters Oregon.

=== HOV lanes ===
US 101 contains peak-hour high-occupancy vehicle (HOV) lanes between La Conchita and Carpinteria, with an extension from Summerland to Santa Barbara under construction as of 2026. HOV lanes are also being considered for a 27-mile (43 km) stretch between SR 23 and SR 33 in Ventura County.

In the Bay Area, part-time HOV lanes have been built sporadically along US 101. The HOV lanes in the North Bay are the second longest in California, with a contiguous length of about 52 miles (84 km) between the Richardson Bay Bridge and Windsor. (Note: The HOV lanes on I‑405 were longer before a portion was converted to HOT lanes.) In San Francisco, the right lanes of US 101 on Lombard Street have been designated temporary HOV lanes in a pilot project launched by the San Francisco Municipal Transportation Agency in 2021.

=== Tolls ===
US 101 features high-occupancy toll (HOT) lanes between I‑380 in San Bruno and SR 237 in Mountain View, with plans to extend them to I‑880 in 2026. HOT lanes in Santa Clara County are co-administered by the Santa Clara Valley Transportation Authority, while the segment in San Mateo County is co-administered by the San Mateo County Express Lanes Joint Powers Authority.

As of January 2026, HOT hours are weekdays between 5:00 a.m. and 8:00 p.m.; outside these hours, they are free and open to all vehicles. Solo drivers are tolled using a congestion pricing system based on real-time traffic levels; two-person carpools are charged half the posted toll and motorcycles and three or more carpools not charged at all. There are no toll booths to receive payment; instead, all tolls are collected using an open road tolling system. Each HOT vehicle is required to carry a FasTrak Flex transponder set to indicate the number of occupants. Solo drivers are also permitted to carry the FasTrak standard tag for access. Drivers without any transponder will be assessed a toll violation, even if they qualify to use the lane for free.

Tolls are also collected for southbound traffic on the Golden Gate Bridge. All-electronic tolling is used and can be paid by either a FasTrak transponder or license plate tolling. The HOV lane leading to the bridge requires three or more riders.

=== Traffic ===
In 2024, US 101's highest average annual daily traffic (AADT) value was 311,000 vehicles in Los Angeles, while the lowest was 2,900 vehicles at the Humboldt–Del Norte county line. Bay Area AADT counts included 273,000 in the South Bay, 42,500 on Van Ness Avenue and 36,000 on Lombard Street, and 173,000 in the North Bay.

US 101 in Los Angeles is known for its congestion, which is often amongst the worst in the United States. A 2004 American Highway Users Alliance (AHUA) study found the US 101/I‑405 interchange to be the most congested interchange in the nation, a 2015 Auto Insurance Center study found US 101 between downtown Los Angeles and Woodland Hills to be the most congested freeway in the nation, and a 2020 INRIX study found US 101 between SR 110 and SR 134 to be the second most congested corridor in the nation.

US 101 also has significant congestion along the San Francisco peninsula. A 2002 AHUA study found the US 101/I‑880 interchange to be the 21st most congested in the nation, and in 2016, the Metropolitan Transportation Commission (MTC) determined US 101 northbound in San Francisco County and southbound in Santa Clara County to be the first and third most congested freeways in the Bay Area, respectively.

== History ==
=== Precursors ===
==== El Camino Real ====
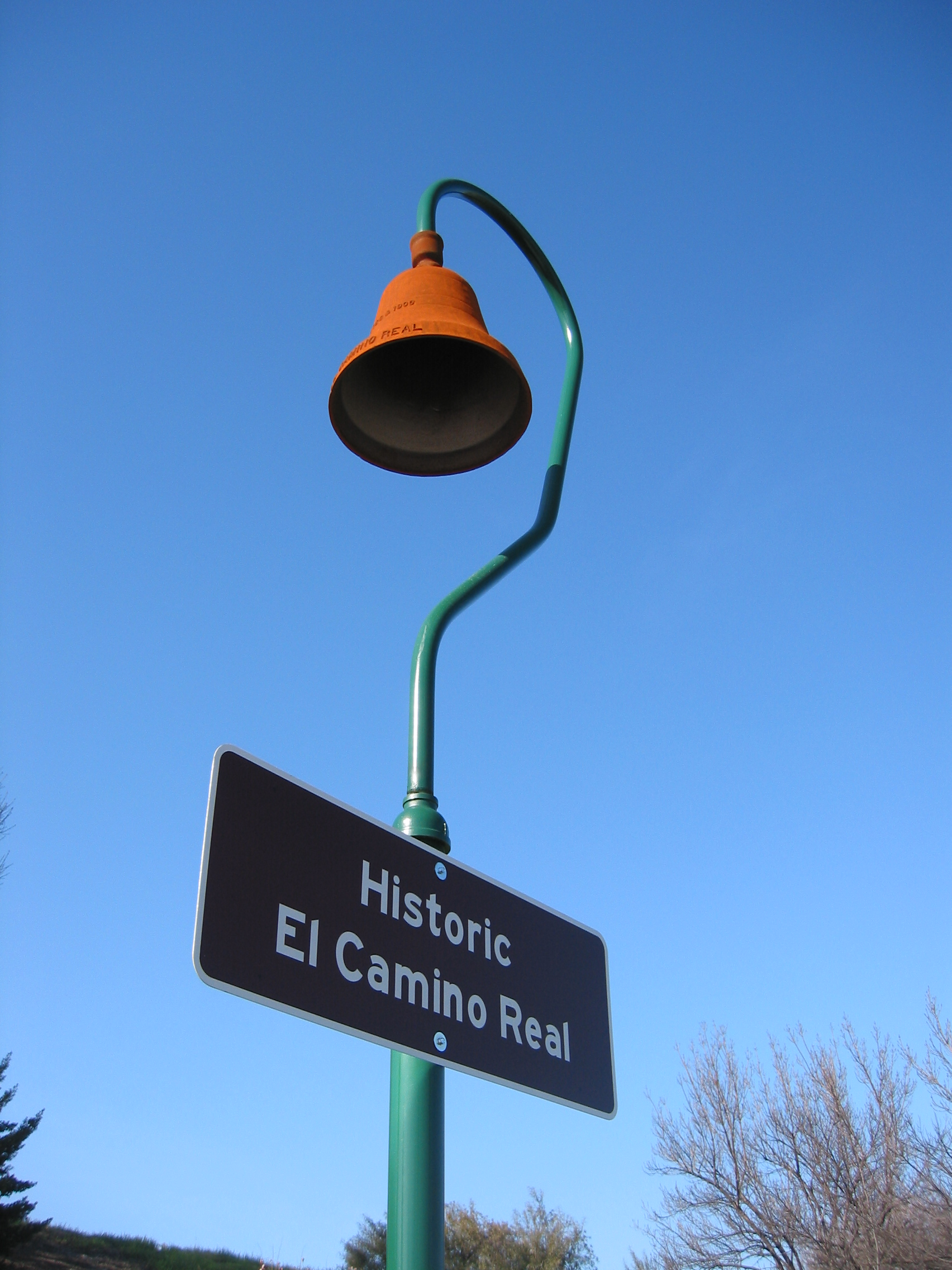
El Camino Real route marker along US 101

Before California entered statehood, Alta California had a loose-knit network of transportation paths deemed by the monarchy of Spain as caminos reales, or "royal roads". These were created beginning in the late 18th century, when Gaspar de Portolá, under the stewardship of Junípero Serra, led Spanish missionaries on two expeditionary runs in the province's coastal regions; missions, pueblos, and presidios were also established between San Diego and Monterey during this time. Six years after Portolá's last expedition, Juan Bautista de Anza followed Portolá's trail from present-day Los Angeles to the Presidio of San Francisco. George Wharton James coined the phrase "El Camino Real" for the road that the expeditions traced out in his 1908 travelogue Through Ramona's Country.

Despite modest improvements in the mid-19th century, El Camino Real was difficult for stagecoaches and freight wagons to navigate. The movement to preserve and memorialize El Camino Real began in 1902, when Anna Pitcher of Pasadena presented a plan to restore the route. Later that year, the California Federation of Women's Clubs adopted the project; government agencies and other organizations supported it as well. In 1904, the Los Angeles Chamber of Commerce formed a convention to support the project; a second convention was held in Santa Barbara that same year. The first distinctive bells marking El Camino Real were erected in 1906 and in 1915, the Automobile Club of Southern California produced a map detailing El Camino Real and the missions.

El Camino Real was part of the Pacific Highway, a chain of highways that existed until 1926. In 1924, a roadway that would eventually become part of US 101 replaced an outdated segment of El Camino Real in Ventura; the replaced segment was later re-signed as SR 1. In 1963, all of El Camino Real was codified in the California Streets and Highways Code and also declared California Historical Landmark No. 784; the state assumed maintenance of El Camino Real's bell markers that same year.

==== Redwood Highway ====
- Redwood Highway
- U.S. National Register of Historic Places
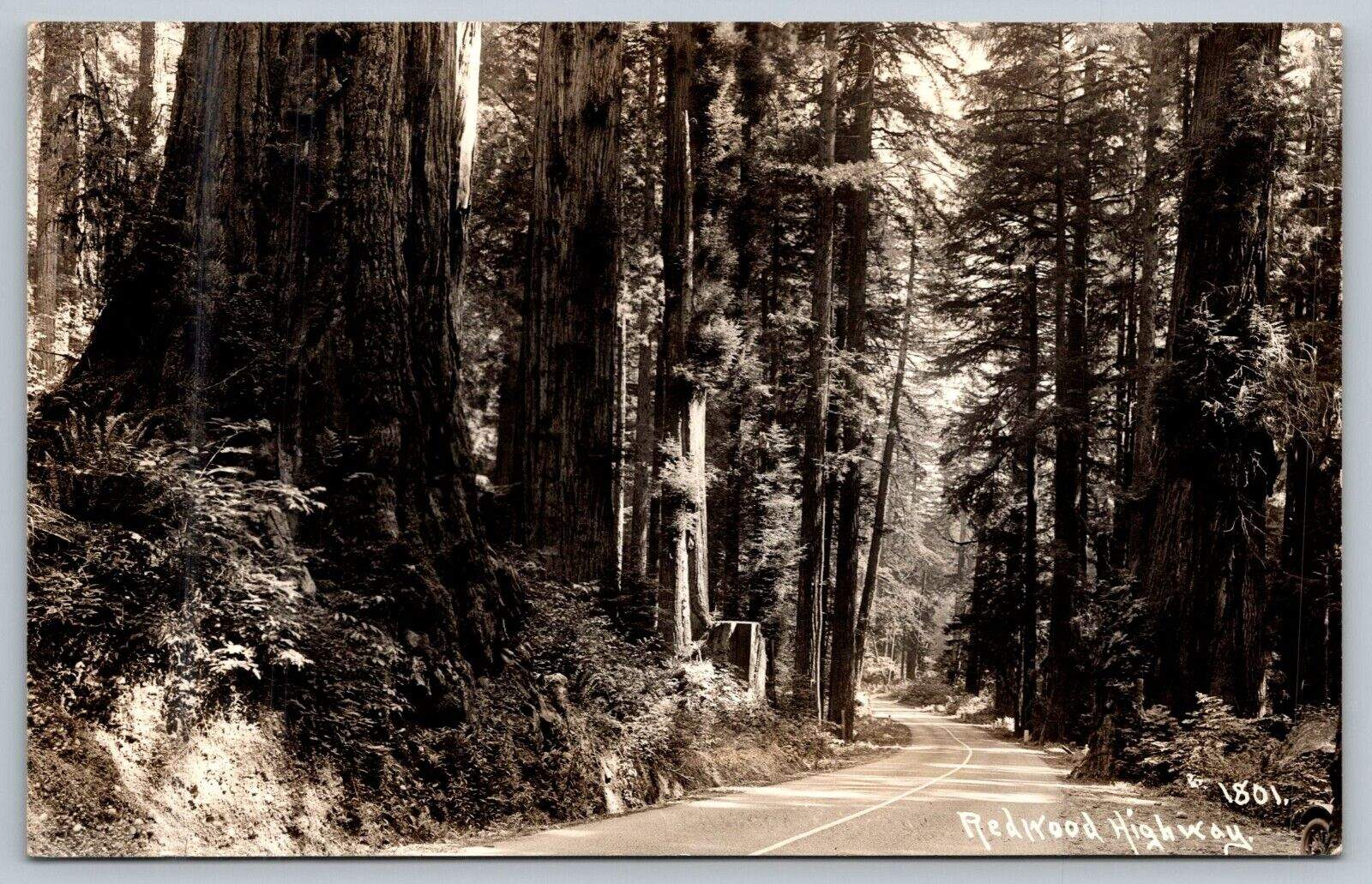
- Redwood Highway c. 1930s
- Nearest city: Klamath, California
- Built: 1900–1949
- NRHP reference No.: 79000253
- Added to NRHP: December 17, 1979

Prior to the 20th century, almost all commerce on the Redwood Coast was done by sea, whereupon ships would dock at portside towns to transport passengers and to deliver and receive goods. Amid the backdrop of a sprawling automobile industry, locals and logging companies called for a reliable highway north of the Golden Gate, as at the time, travel by motorcar across these regions could take days. In 1910, the California government passed the State Highway Bond Act, authorizing funds for a statewide road system.

Construction of Redwood Highway began in Del Norte County in 1917, with another section constructed on tidal wetlands bordering Humboldt Bay between 1918 and 1919. In 1921, Crescent City hotelier A. D. Lee proposed the name Redwood Highway to honor Save the Redwoods League and their work preserving redwood forests in the area. Local communities and the city of San Francisco endorsed the proposal, which was adopted in 1957. The California Highway Commission also set stringent limits on the number of trees that could be cleared during the highway's construction, while the trees that were cut down were often used as guardrails, drainage control devices, or to build a 4,000-foot (1,200 m) trestle over Big Lagoon, at the time the largest native wood structure in the state highway system. Ultimately, increased awareness of the destruction of the redwoods led to the establishment of Redwood National Park.

Landslides and washouts repeatedly frustrated progress on Redwood Highway, with overall construction lasting about nine years, during which the highway opened segment by segment. The highway excluding a bridge across the Klamath River was complete by the end of 1923; the final bridge, the Douglas Memorial Bridge, was dedicated on May 17, 1926, and opened to traffic on October 29 following completion of road surfacing approaching the bridge. To boost tourism in the area, the Redwood Highway Association marketed the highway's beauty, most successfully with the internationally publicized 480-mile (770 km) Redwood Highway Marathon, held in 1927 and 1928. The National Automobile Club also surveyed a split route for Redwood Highway in 1928, but it was not adopted.

==== Hollywood Freeway ====
In 1924, Los Angeles voters backed the Major Traffic Street Plan to address the city's worsening traffic. A "stop-free express highway" between downtown Los Angeles and the San Fernando Valley via the Cahuenga Pass was included in the plan, and the city acquired many residential and commercial properties to make room for it.

=== Creation ===
AASHTO announced its intent to establish US 101 in California in 1925. The highway was originally envisioned to run for 935 miles (1,505 km) between the Mexican border at Tijuana and the Oregon state line south of Brookings, aligning with the future Hollywood Freeway as well as State Legislative Routes 1 and 2 and also occupying El Camino Real and all but the Crescent City–Grants Pass section of Redwood Highway (which would be designated US 199). With this alignment, US 101 would be the westernmost route in the United States Numbered Highway System. Although the three-digit number in US 101 contravened the system's numerical conventions, it was selected for being the next available odd number west of US 99, on the condition that the numeral 101 is treated as two digits instead of three: a 10 and a 1. The US 101 designation was approved on November 11, 1926, with its routing in California mostly unchanged from its conceptual phase. (Note: The approved plan extended US 101 to Olympia, Washington.)

US 101's traffic signs were erected by the Automobile Club of Southern California in Southern California and California State Automobile Association in the north. The first signs were placed along the San Diego–Los Angeles segment in January 1928, with the rest placed that summer.

==== Mexican border to Los Angeles ====
Historic US 101 sign

At its inception, US 101 traversed the San Diego suburbs on Beyer Boulevard in San Ysidro, Broadway in Chula Vista, and National City Boulevard in National City. From there, the route took an erratic path through the city, coming within a few blocks of Balboa Park before turning west and traveling through downtown, then turning north onto India Street. North of Mission Bay, US 101 turned west through Pacific Beach, before turning back north on La Jolla Boulevard and serving the business areas of La Jolla. By the 1940s, however, the downtown section was truncated onto Harbor Drive close to the San Diego Bay, and the La Jolla segment was re-routed inland onto Rose Canyon Road.

In Del Mar, US 101 aligned with the Torrey Pines bypass, built in 1933 to avoid a dangerous highway that predated federal designations; at opening, it was dubbed "Million Dollar Highway" for the cost of construction (amounting to $19.7 million in 2025). Likewise in the area, the route traversed the Surf Line and Los Peñasquitos Creek estuary via bridges. Afterward, it continued along the Pacific Coast through Solana Beach, Encinitas, Carlsbad, and Oceanside.

US 101 continued past Marine Corps Base Camp Pendleton, where it entered Orange County and passed through San Clemente. At Doheny Park north of San Clemente, US 101 originally split into two routes, with US 101 Alternate serving the beachside cities before converging with the main route in Oxnard. The main branch route veered inland through San Juan Capistrano, Laguna Niguel, and Mission Viejo, after which it zigzagged through Irvine and Tustin, with a concentrated section in the latter once containing the Tustin Garage and up to ten fuel stations for motorists traveling from the south. North of Tustin, US 101 followed Katella Avenue and Spadra Road, then passed through southeastern Los Angeles County on Montebello Boulevard and entered Los Angeles on Whittier Boulevard.

Due to increased traffic, US 101 between Carlsbad and Oceanside was upgraded to freeway standards in the 1950s. US 101 Alternate was re-designated as SR 1 in 1963. The next year, California streamlined its numbered routes across the state and stipulated that U.S. Highways be removed in favor of Interstate highways. As a result, I‑5 supplanted US 101 entirely between Los Angeles and the Mexican border, after which, many of US 101's former surface roads were relinquished for municipal and county control. The section through Camp Pendleton was closed off to the public, while a majority of the route in northern San Diego County was designated County Route S21. Historic route signs were also added to former sections in San Diego, Del Mar, and Solana Beach.

==== Los Angeles and the Central Coast ====
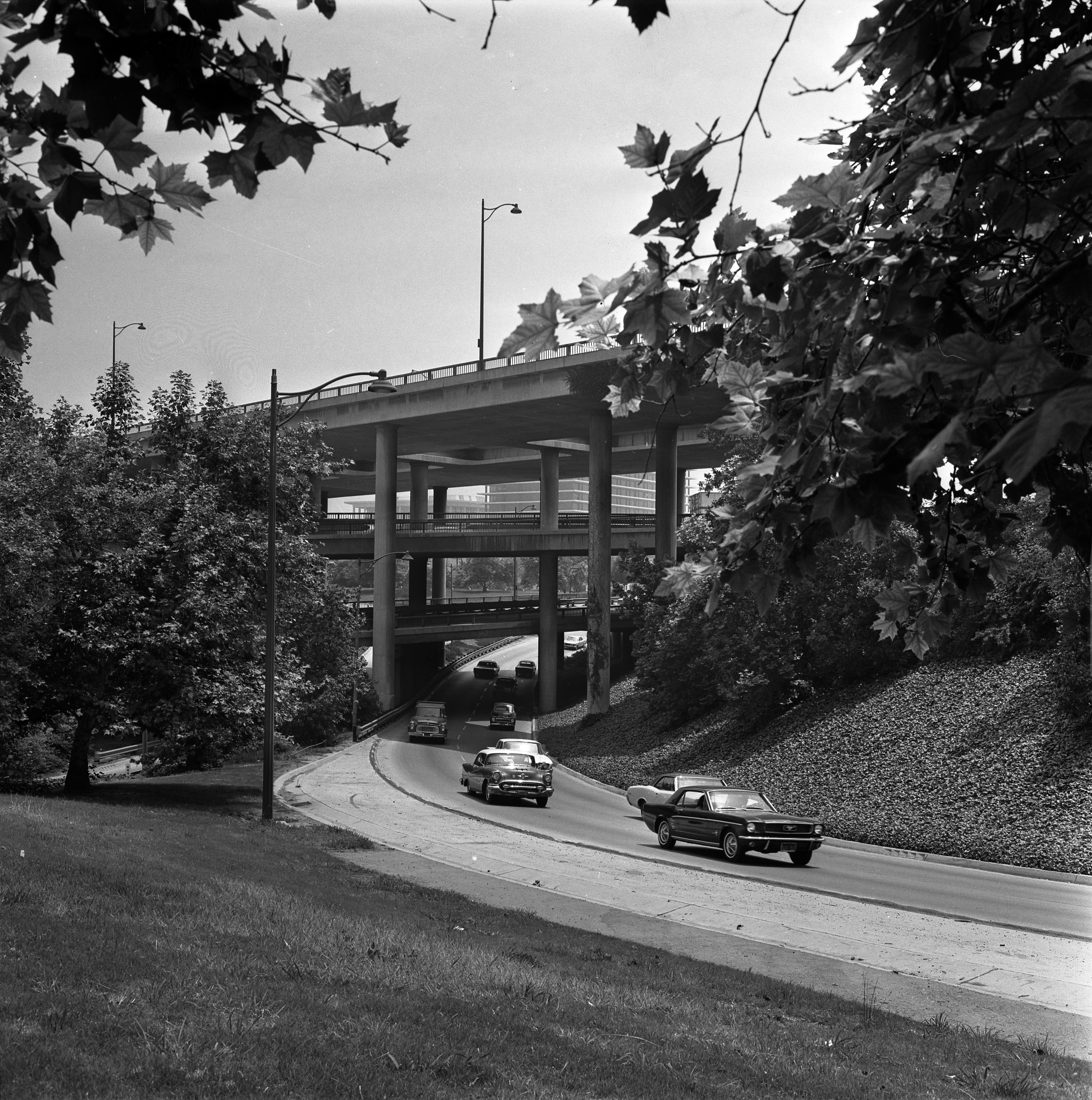
Four Level Interchange in 1966

The first section of the downtown Los Angeles–San Fernando Valley expressway to open was the Cahuenga Pass Freeway in 1940. This section was extended by 10 miles (16 km) at a cost of $55 million in 1954 ($659 million in 2025), to Vineland Avenue in the San Fernando Valley and Spring Street in downtown's Civic Center, at which point the route was renamed Hollywood Freeway. The Downtown Slot also opened in 1954, while the Four Level Interchange, the world’s first stack interchange, was completed in 1949 but not put into full use until 1953. Proposed interchanges with the never-built Beverly Hills Freeway near Glendale, Malibu Freeway near Malibu Canyon, and the Laurel Canyon Freeway at the Hollywood Split were canceled in response to freeway revolts in the 1960s and 1970s.

In 1952, the State Highway Commission announced plans for a freeway along El Camino Real through Los Angeles' San Fernando Valley. The route, which previously ran along Ventura Boulevard between Sepulveda Boulevard and the western city limit, was constructed and opened in segments between 1956 and 1960, and by 1961, US 101 had been upgraded to freeway standards from Los Angeles through Santa Barbara. Conejo Grade was built as part of this upgrade; it replaced a windy two-lane road built in 1914. Grade separation in Camarillo was also part of the upgrade; completed in 1954, it eliminated the last railroad crossing on US 101 between Los Angeles and San Francisco.

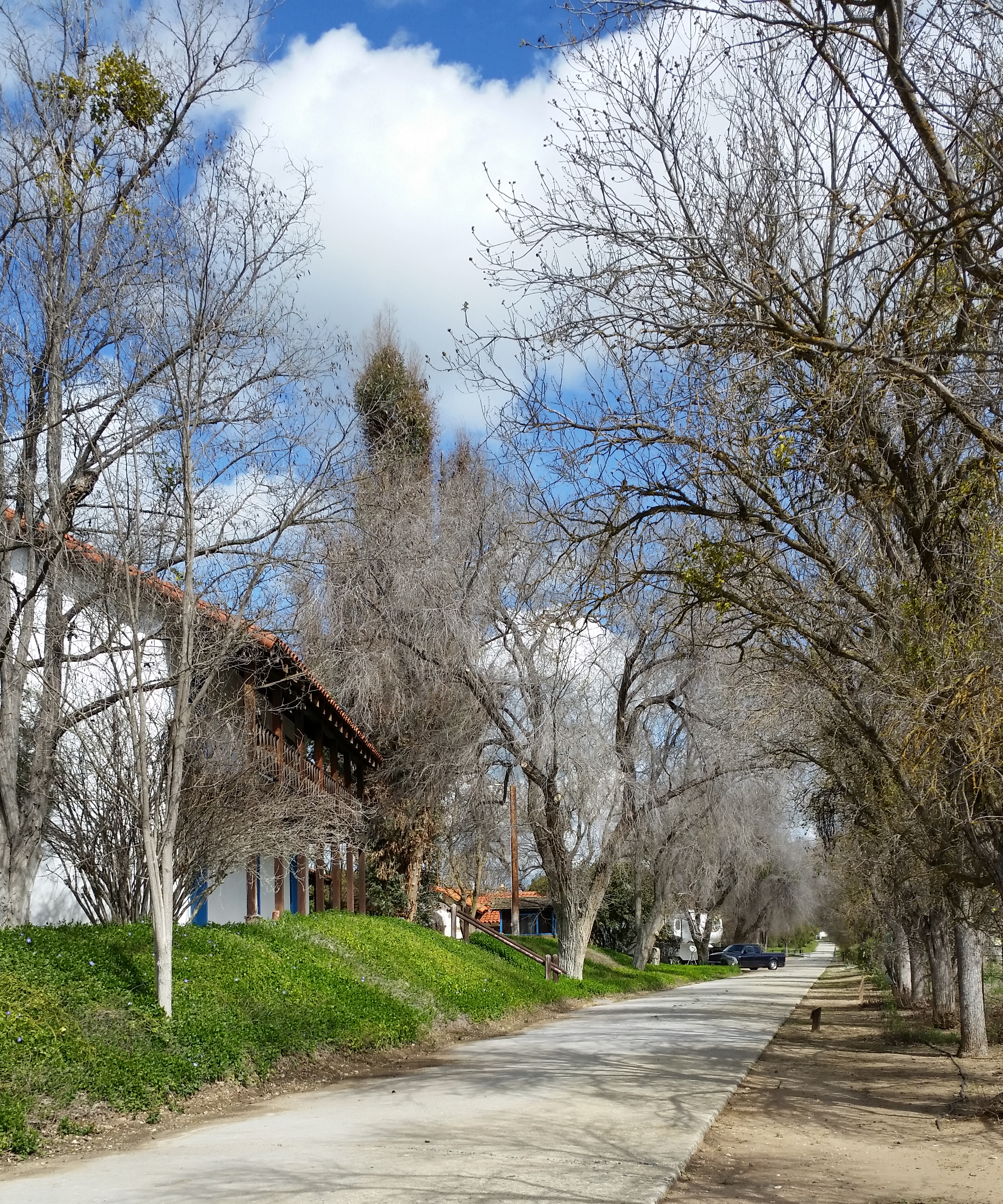
A section of US 101 in San Miguel that was bypassed in 1938

West of Santa Barbara, US 101 traversed the Gaviota Pass, which was originally part of El Camino Real and was declared California Historic Landmark No. 248 in 1937. Gaviota Tunnel opened to northbound traffic in the pass in 1953, with the previous road repurposed for southbound traffic. By 1954, the entire route was upgraded to expressway standards through the pass.

North of Gaviota, bypasses funded by the Collier–Burns Highway Act of 1947 allowed US 101 to bypass most town centers by the 1950s, although an interchange of US 101/SR 1 was constructed in Las Cruces in 1967, destroying the town. Conversely, a 1951 study determined that frontage-road businesses along a new Santa Barbara–Buellton alignment saw minimal impact on customer volume. This combined with improvements into Santa Ynez Valley lengthened US 101 by 12 miles (19 km) but shortened travel time because it allowed for higher speeds.

Further north, the Prunedale Cutoff replaced a more hazardous route over the Gabilan Range via San Juan Grade in 1932, and Cuesta Pass opened as an expressway in 1938. In Salinas, US 101 was built as a freeway for 10 miles (16 km) by 1954, and the Sala Road interchange, adopted in 1964, connected to this segment.

==== San Francisco Bay Area ====
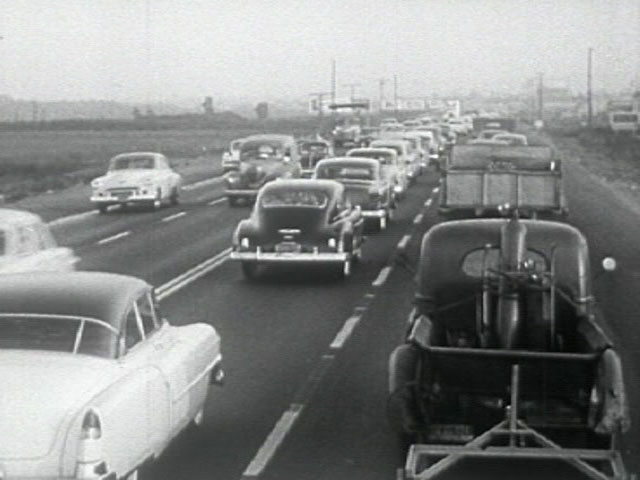
Bayshore Highway in 1955, prior to freeway upgrades

Bayshore Highway, located on the San Francisco Peninsula, was completed in 1929, the first section to open being a tolled arterial between San Bruno and Visitacion Valley. Between 1929 and 1936, US 101 was signed as US 101W along the peninsula and US 101E along the East Bay to Oakland, the latter then overlapping with US 40 westward across the San Francisco Bay through a ferry connection. The split routes then rejoined at Hyde Street Pier in San Francisco. Additional ferries traversed the Golden Gate prior to the completion of the Golden Gate Bridge in 1937.

In 1936, US 101 on the San Francisco Peninsula was truncated at Bayshore Highway, while El Camino Real was re-signed as US 101 Alternate. However, due to local opposition, this section of US 101 was reverted to El Camino Real two years later, while Bayshore Highway was renamed US 101 Bypass. US 101E was also re-signed as SR 17 during this time.

Bayshore Highway was upgraded to freeway standards starting in 1940. The first segment, a two-mile (3.2 km) stretch between San Mateo and Burlingame, was completed in 1947, making it the Bay Area's first freeway. The freeway was extended to San Jose and San Francisco in 1962, after which it was designated part of US 101 while El Camino Real was re-signed as SR 82. Plans to build a direct connection to the Golden Gate Bridge on the Central Freeway, a northerly continuation of the Bayshore Freeway, were canceled in 1959 due to backlash by residents; as a result, only a portion of this segment was completed.

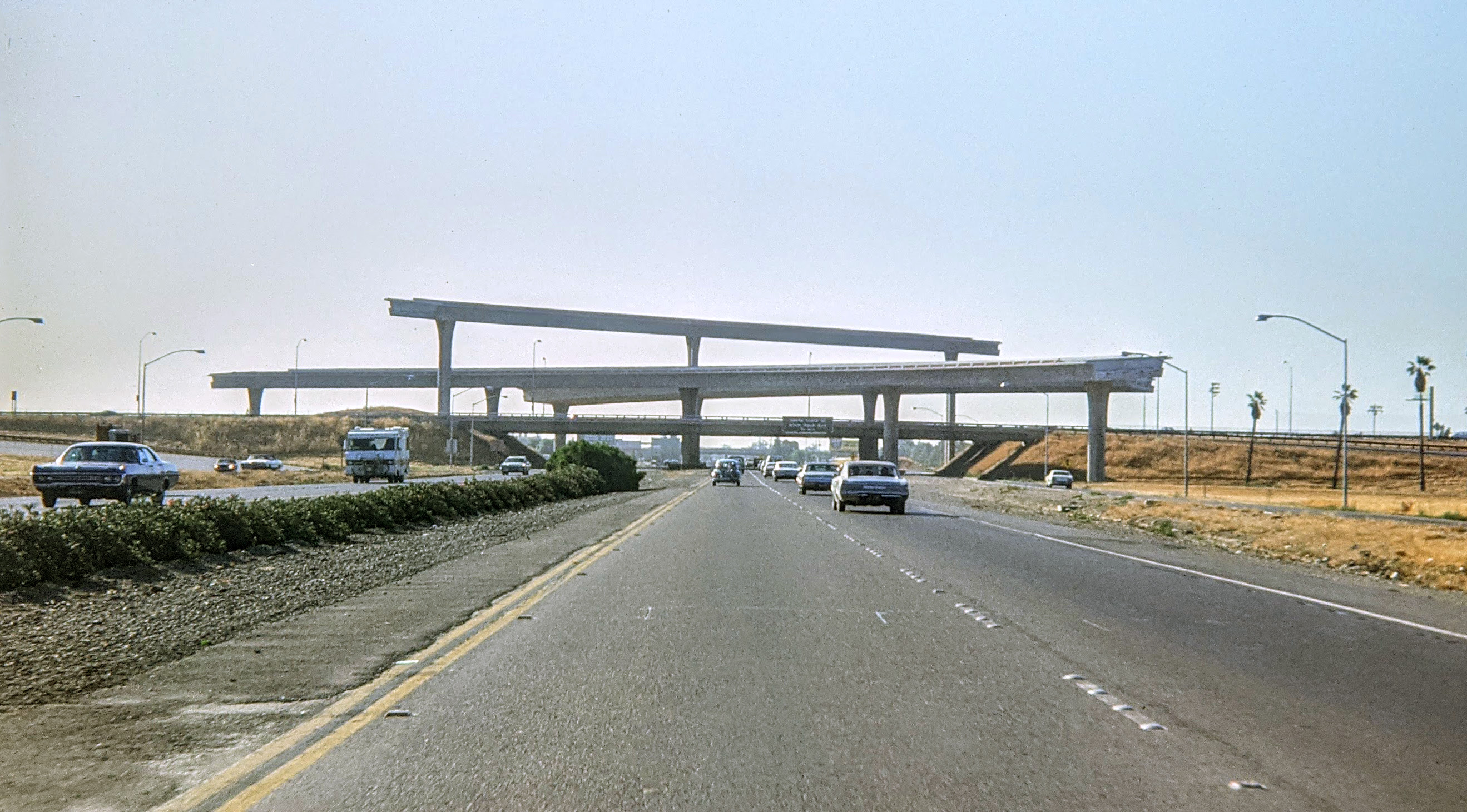
The incomplete and delayed Joe Colla Interchange in 1975

In Santa Clara County, a four-lane alignment replaced a windy section of US 101 across the Pajaro River in Sargent in the early 1940s and a 24.6-mile (39.6 km) bypass through southern Santa Clara Valley was adopted in 1961 and constructed in the early 1970s. Additionally, the Joe Colla Interchange was completed in 1981, after lengthy delays.

In Marin County, US 101's Sausalito–San Rafael segment was completed in the early 1930s; construction concluded with a one-quarter-mile (0.40 km) redwood bridge over Richardson Bay. Twin bores of the Waldo Tunnel (later renamed Robin Williams Tunnel), which connect Sausalito and Marin City at the highest point of Waldo Grade, opened individually in 1937 and 1954, and the bridge across Richardson Bay was replaced in 1956. Additionally, numerous North Bay improvements in the 1950s centered on bypassing cities and freeway upgrades. An exception was Santa Rosa, where US 101 was routed through the city; even so, the route was upgraded to freeway standards with the completion of the Steele Lane interchange in 1965. Additional bypasses were constructed in Novato and Geyserville in the 1970s.

==== Northern California ====
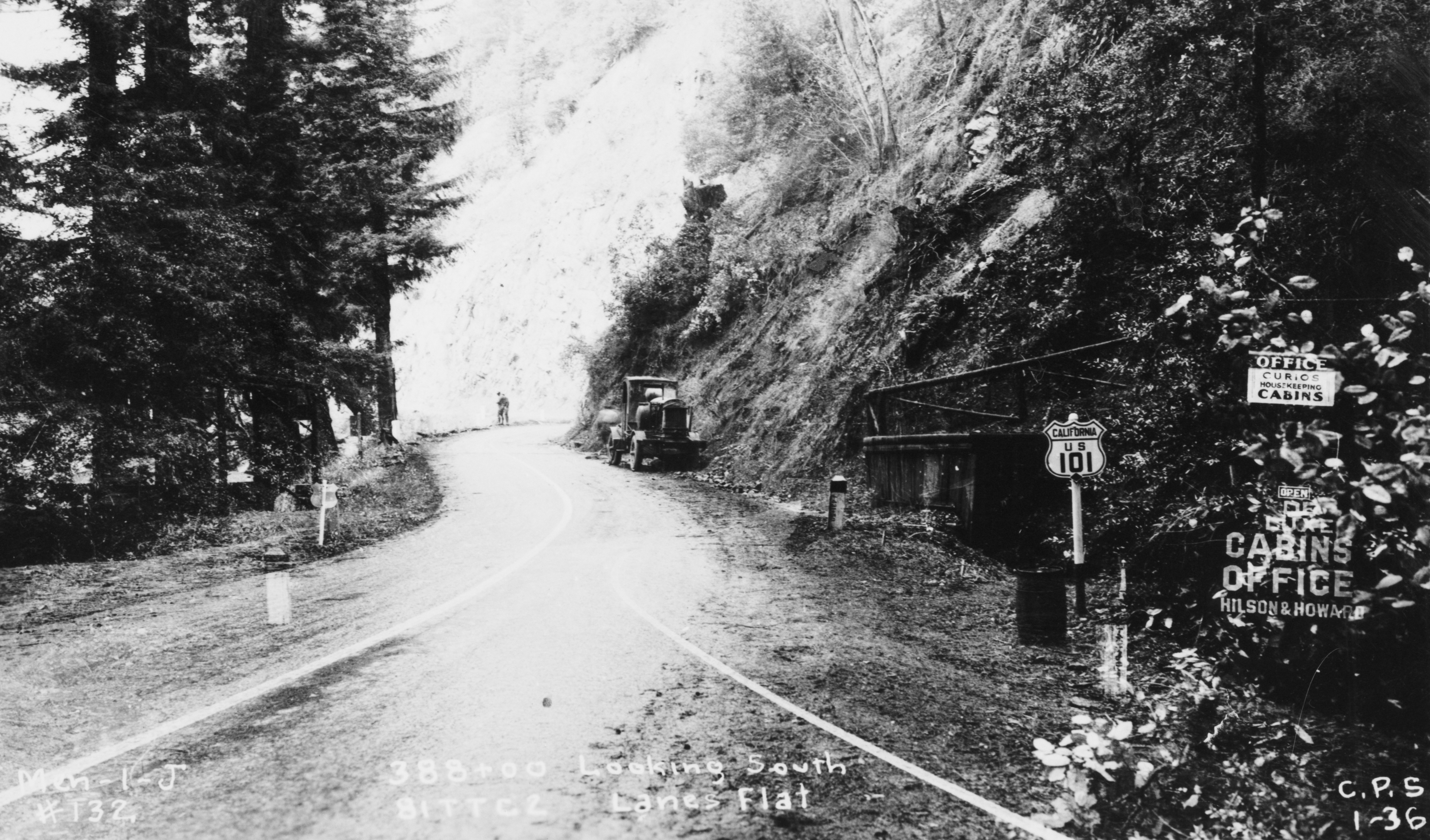
US 101 in Mendocino County in 1936

While Redwood Highway was completed from Sausalito, California, to Grants Pass, Oregon, in 1926, some remote sections in Mendocino, Humboldt, and Del Norte counties were redeveloped soon after to improve grades and provide curve corrections. For example, a segment built between Outlet Creek and Reeves Creek in the late 1930s eliminated 47 turns, and a new 1940s alignment in Piercy lowered the segment's total curvature from 2,978 degrees to 807. Additionally, six miles (9.7 km) of the highway in Del Norte county were relocated in the early 1930s, due to landslides along the original route.

Despite these and other upgrades, freeway and expressway segments are not as prevalent on this segment of US 101 compared to elsewhere in the state. A variety of factors, most of which came into play in the middle of the 20th century, contributed to this, most notably local business owners opposed bypasses, and conservationists protested the destruction that the construction of a multi-lane highway would necessitate. On the other hand, Eureka-based Times-Standard, as well as several local taxpayer groups, supported the improved safety that upgrades would bring. The Redwood Empire Association also urged the State Highway Commission to not truncate US 101 outside state park boundaries.

Ridgewood Grade, located in Mendocino County and opened in 1954, was the first section of Redwood Highway upgraded to expressway. The following year, Assemblyman Frank P. Belotti introduced legislation that would allot $10 million ($120 million in 2025) from state park funds towards a 23-mile (37 km) bypass through Humboldt Redwoods State Park. Governor Goodwin Knight later vetoed the bill, after which the two sides agreed to expand the bypass to 44 miles (71 km) around the park and only remove trees with heights less than six feet (1.8 m). This bypass was completed in the 1960s at an estimated $36 million ($426 million in 2025), while the old alignment, known as the Avenue of the Giants, became SR 254.

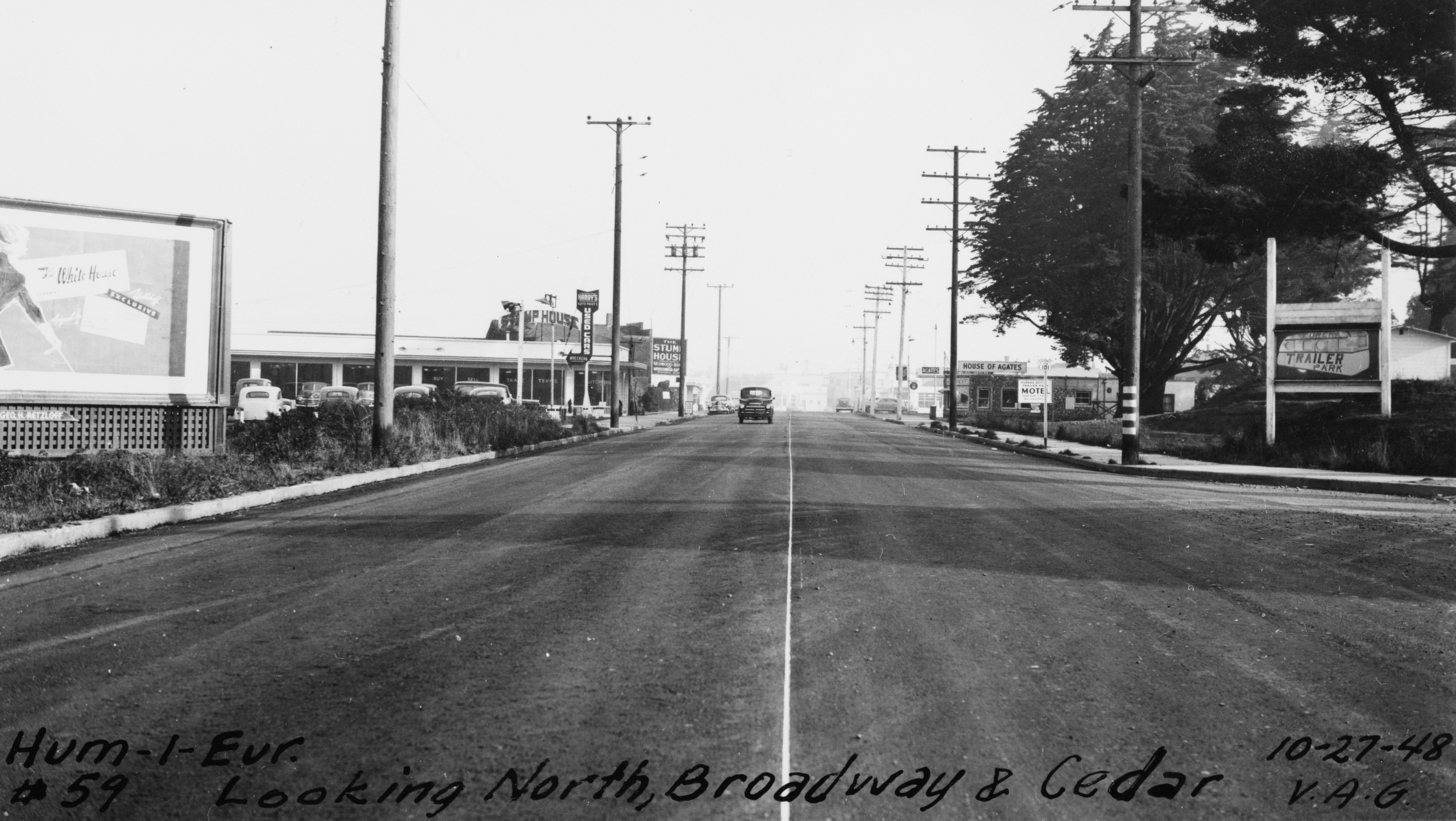
US 101 through Eureka in 1948

In Eureka, the Big Lagoon trestle was demolished in favor of embankments carrying a three-mile (4.8 km) expressway, which opened in 1959 at a cost of $1.84 million ($203 million in 2025). Additionally, the Arcata–Trinidad freeway located north of Eureka was completed by the early 1960s, as was a second freeway section from Hydesville to south of Eureka with bypasses at Fortuna and Loleta. The southern segment was augmented by the Herrick Avenue interchange in 1984, and by the SR 36 interchange at Alton in 2011.

Elsewhere along Redwood Highway, a 14.5-mile (23.3 km) freeway upgrade was completed in Ukiah in 1965, then extended north through Redwood Valley in the late 1980s, and a $1 million ($10.7 million in 2025), thirteen-span viaduct opened across the Eel River in 1964. Additionally, numerous bridges were damaged during the Christmas flood of 1964, each of which was repaired or replaced by the following March, the last being a new construction that replaced the Douglas Memorial Bridge over the Klamath River.

=== Modern developments ===
==== Los Angeles and the Central Coast ====
The last traffic signal on US 101 between Los Angeles and San Francisco, located in Santa Barbara, was removed in 1991. A lane was added in both directions of the Ventura Freeway in the 1990s, eliminating several bottlenecks, and the Van Nuys Boulevard on and off-ramps were widened to reduce congestion at the nearby US 101/I‑405 interchange in 2011. New lanes and truck pullouts were added to Cuesta Grade in 2004, and three interchanges were added in Prunedale in 2014. A four-phase widening project to add a lane in each direction in the Santa Barbara area began construction in 2008; its final phase, which includes the addition of high-occupancy lanes, began in 2020, at which point the phase was estimated to cost $700 million ($871 million in 2025) and be completed in 2027.

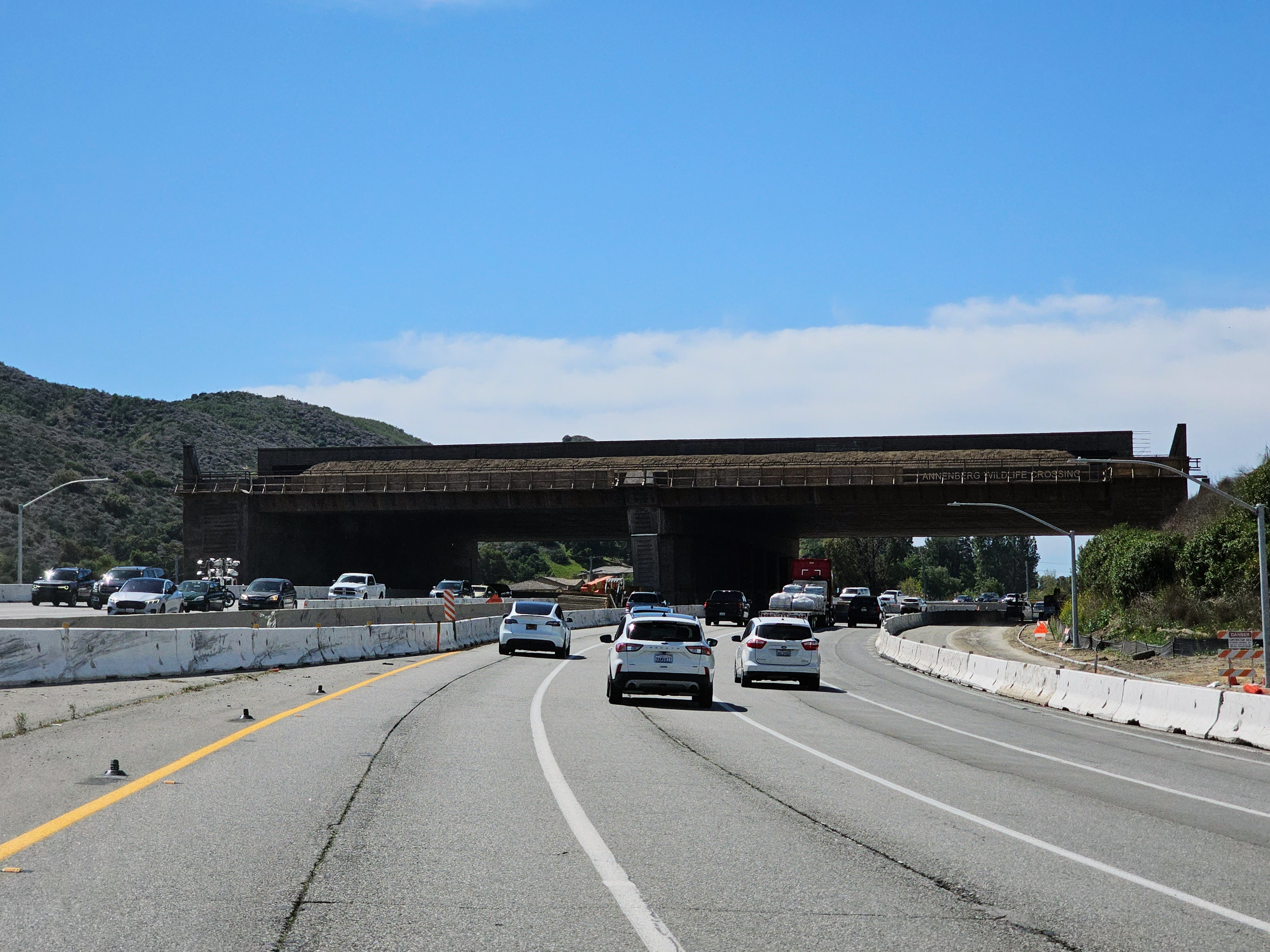
Annenberg Wildlife Crossing in 2025

In 2024, the city of Los Angeles undertook a beautification project on 8.7 miles (14.0 km) of US 101 in Hollywood, the project emphasizing the movie culture in the area and featuring amongst other artwork a 22-foot (6.7 m) steel art sculpture depicting fluttering filmstrips in the freeway median. Construction of the Wallis Annenberg Wildlife Crossing also began in 2024; this crossing, a vegetated overpass spanning US 101 in Agoura Hills, will connect the Santa Monica Mountains with the Simi Hills and upon completion will be the largest wildlife crossing in the world.

==== San Francisco Bay Area ====
In 1984, San Mateo and Santa Clara County residents voted to use sales tax funds to fund HOV lanes on US 101 in their counties. These lanes were extended through San Jose in 1990 and into Morgan Hill by 2003, and the Mountain View–Redwood City section was converted to HOT lanes in 2022, then extended to San Bruno in 2023. Furthermore, US 101 was expanded to eight lanes between SR 85 in San Jose and Cochrane Road in Morgan Hill in 2003, and a new interchange at Bailey Avenue, planned since the 1970s, opened in 2004.

The 1989 Loma Prieta earthquake caused severe damage to San Francisco's Central Freeway, prompting its immediate closure. In 1997, a narrow majority of residents voted to rebuild the freeway; however, another vote the following year saw the majority vote for it to be dismantled, and this vote was affirmed the year after that. Demolition was completed by 2005, and the vacated right-of-way was redeveloped into Octavia Boulevard.

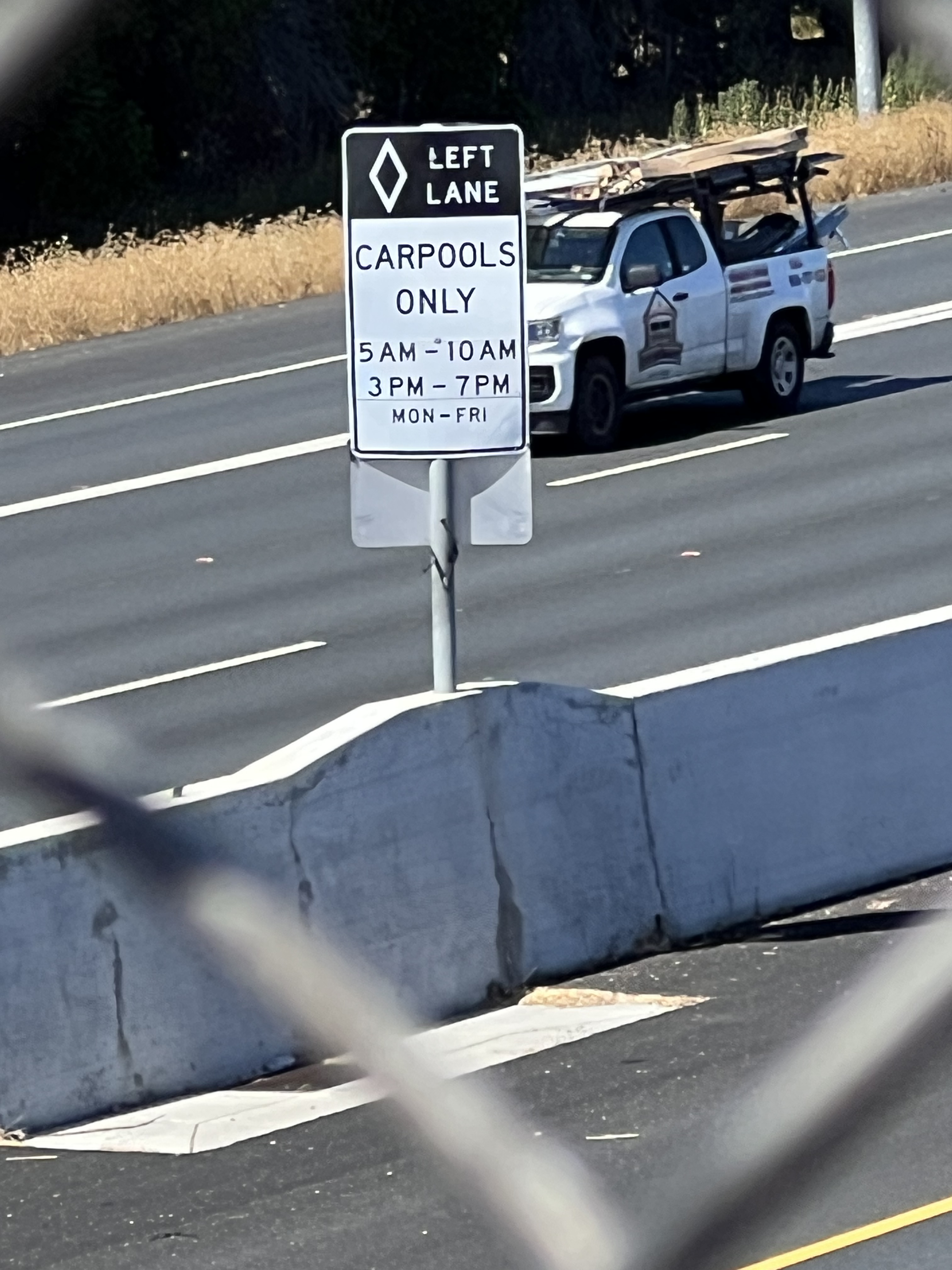
HOV sign on US 101 in Petaluma, 2025

In 2000, Caltrans and the MTC unveiled a joint plan to build continuous HOV lanes on US 101 throughout the North Bay. At the time, facilities were already existent in Marin County, having been converted from contraflow bus lanes in the 1980s, but a gap at San Rafael was not filled until 2011. HOV lanes opened in Sonoma County in 2022, and the final segment between Petaluma and the Marin–Sonoma county line opened in 2025; these segments were also tied to a separate 30-year, $1.5 billion US 101 improvement project that was completed in 2025. As part of this project, HOV lanes were built between Novato and Sonoma County, the entire route between Novato and Petaluma was upgraded to freeway standards, and new bridges were built across San Antonio Creek and the Petaluma River.

In 2009, a project began to rebuild US 101's approach to the Golden Gate Bridge through the Presidio, replacing the aging Doyle Drive viaduct. The new approach, known as Presidio Parkway, incorporated two sets of tunnels and opened in 2015, while the Presidio Tunnel Tops recreational area, located above the tunnels, opened in 2022. Also in 2022, MUNI built center bus lanes and landscaped medians on Van Ness Avenue, including its US 101 segment, as part of the Van Ness Bus Rapid Transit project.

==== Northern California ====
US 101 was truncated onto a new alignment through Prairie Creek Redwoods State Park from the late 1980s to early 1990s. A four-mile (6.4 km) bypass in Cloverdale was completed in 1994 at a cost of $40 million ($86.9 million in 2025); the project also added frontage roads and relocated Northwestern Pacific Railroad trackage. In 2009, a section of US 101 north of Leggett was moved across Eel River via the Confusion Hill Bridges in order to prevent the infrequent but expensive winter closures that occurred along the old alignment. Additionally, a six-mile (9.7 km) bypass at Willits broke ground in 2013 and was completed in 2016, more than sixty years after initially proposed. This project, controversial because it re-routed US 101 through protected wetlands, cost $459 million ($616 million in 2025), included a 1.1-mile (1.8 km) viaduct across a flood plain, and re-located the US 101/SR 20 interchange from inside city limits to south of the city. As of 2025, the remainder of the old route was still part of the state highway system, under the designation 101U (for unrelinquished).

== Future ==
In Los Angeles, two plans to cap US 101 have been proposed: one downtown and the other in Hollywood, with the Hollywood Freeway cap estimated to cost $1 billion in 2015 (equivalent to $1.33 billion in 2025) and the downtown cap $180 million in 2017 (equivalent to $232 million in 2025). Elsewhere in Southern California, a long term traffic reduction project for a 27-mile (43 km) stretch between SR 23 and SR 33 was under study as of 2026.

In San Luis Obispo County, an $85 million traffic easement project in Pismo Beach began in 2026, with an expected completion date of December 2028, and improvements between Cuesta Grade and the northern county line are also under study. In Monterey County, preliminary work on multiple improvements to an eight-mile (13 km) stretch between Salinas and Chualar, the result of which would upgrade the corridor from expressway to freeway, began in 2024, with construction scheduled to begin in 2031. The US 101/SR 156 interchange has also been proposed for reconstruction and US 101 upgraded from expressway to freeway through it.

Numerous upgrades to US 101 are either under study or in the works in the Bay Area. In San Mateo County, improvements to the US 101/SR 92 interchange are scheduled to begin in 2027 and the county also has plans to add 22 miles (35 km) of express lanes between I‑380 and the north county line, after which express lanes would span the entire county. A $135 million construction project to improve the US 101/SR 25 interchange began in 2025 with an expected completion in 2027, while a US 101/SR 84 improvement project is scheduled to begin construction in 2027. In more long term plans, several proposals have been made to address sea level rise on a particularly vulnerable stretch of US 101 in Marin City by 2050.

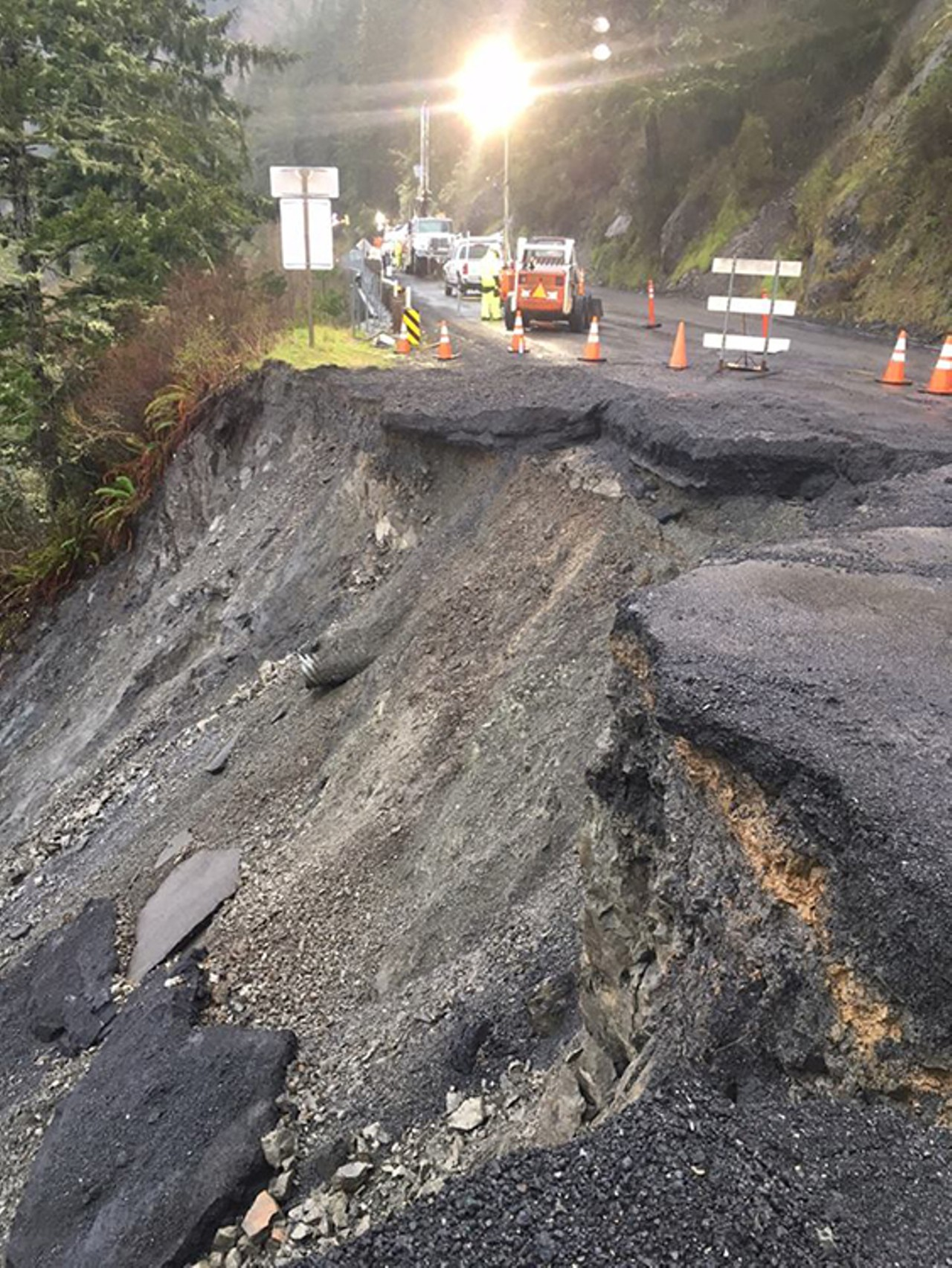
Landslide at Last Chance Grade in 2020

In Northern California, Caltrans determined in 2000 that a bypass around Richardson Grove State Park was cost-prohibitive and instead recommended the section be realigned in compliance with the Surface Transportation Assistance Act of 1982, but as of 2026, construction on the re-alignment had not begun. Caltrans has also proposed a 6,000-foot (1,800 m) tunnel between Klamath and Crescent City that would replace Last Chance Grade; the tunnel was estimated to cost $2 billion in 2026. Smaller projects in Northern California include fixing a portion of US 101 slipping into the South Fork Eel River near the Mendocino–Humboldt county line.

== Names and memorials ==
The entirety of US 101 in California is named Coast Highway and Blue Star Memorial Highway. Various segments also have additional names or memorial designations, although most are not used colloquially. Instead, California residents usually refer to US 101 as "101" ("one-oh-one"), or in the case of southern Californians, "the 101".

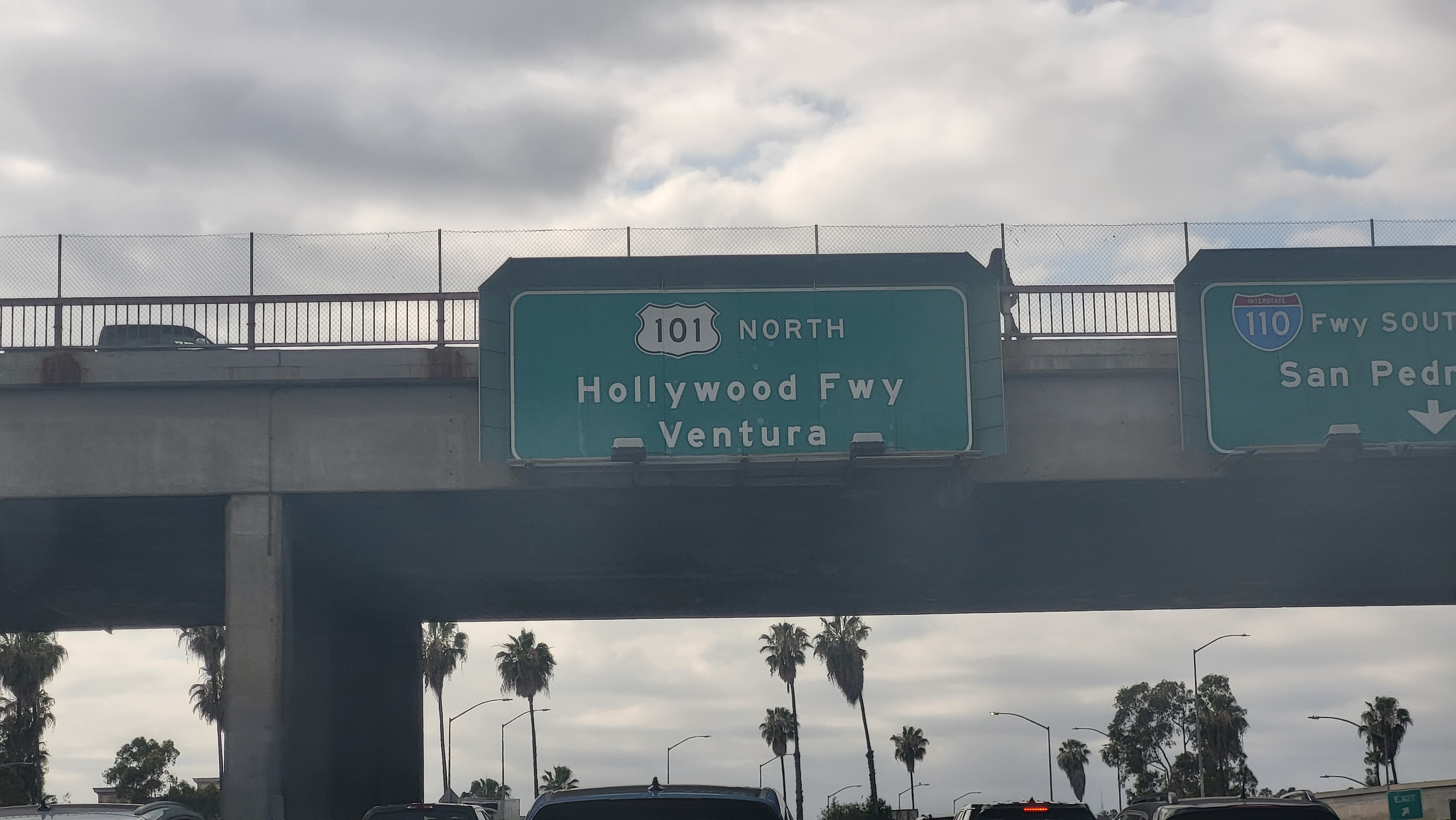
Hollywood Freeway sign in Los Angeles

In Southern California, US 101 is named Santa Ana Freeway in downtown Los Angeles between the route’s southern end and SR 110, Hollywood Freeway in Los Angeles between SR 110 and SR 170, and Ventura Freeway between SR 134 in Los Angeles and the western Ventura County border. US 101 is also named Screaming Eagles Highway in Ventura County and this section is also part of the National Purple Heart Trail.

Along the Central Coast, various segments of US 101 are named El Camino Real or El Camino Real Freeway; some segments also coincide with the Juan Bautista de Anza National Historic Trail and the entire route, including all of US 101 in Santa Barbara, San Luis Obispo, and Monterey counties, is part of the National Purple Heart Trail. Additionally, in Monterey County, US 101 is named John Steinbeck Highway between SR 68 and Espinoza Road/Russel Road in Salinas and Gateway to the Pinnacles Highway between Arroyo Seco Road and Camphora Gloria Road near Soledad.

US 101 has numerous names in the Bay Area. In the South Bay, US 101 is named South Valley Freeway between Gilroy and SR 85 in San Jose, Sig Sanchez Highway in Santa Clara County between the Morgan Hill Bypass and an undefined point, and Bayshore Freeway between SR 82 in San Jose and I‑80 in San Francisco. In San Francisco, US 101 is named Central Freeway between I‑80 and Mission Street, near Potrero Hill the route is often called Hospital Curve due to its proximity to San Francisco General Hospital, and the route’s surface street sections are commonly referred to by their street names. US 101 is named Redwood Highway throughout the entirety of the North Bay; it is also named William T. Bagley Freeway between the Robin Williams Tunnel in Sausalito and I‑580 in San Rafael and Colonel William R. “Bill” Lucius Highway between the southern Sonoma County border and Russian River south of Healdsburg.

In Northern California, US 101 is named Redwood Highway for almost its entire length; only the 16 miles (26 km) between US 199 and the Oregon border is not. US 101 also has several other names in this area. In Humboldt County, it is named Leo Stanley Hulett Highway in Willits, Frank P. Belotti Highway between the southern terminus of Avenue of the Giants and Englewood, and Don Clausen Highway along the Redwood National Park bypass. Additionally, in Eureka, US 101 is known by various names: Michael J. Burns Freeway on the expressway, Broadway on the north–south street segment (largely unsigned and not registered on Caltrans' logs), and by its street names along its downtown couplet. US 101 is also known by its street names along its Crescent City couplet.

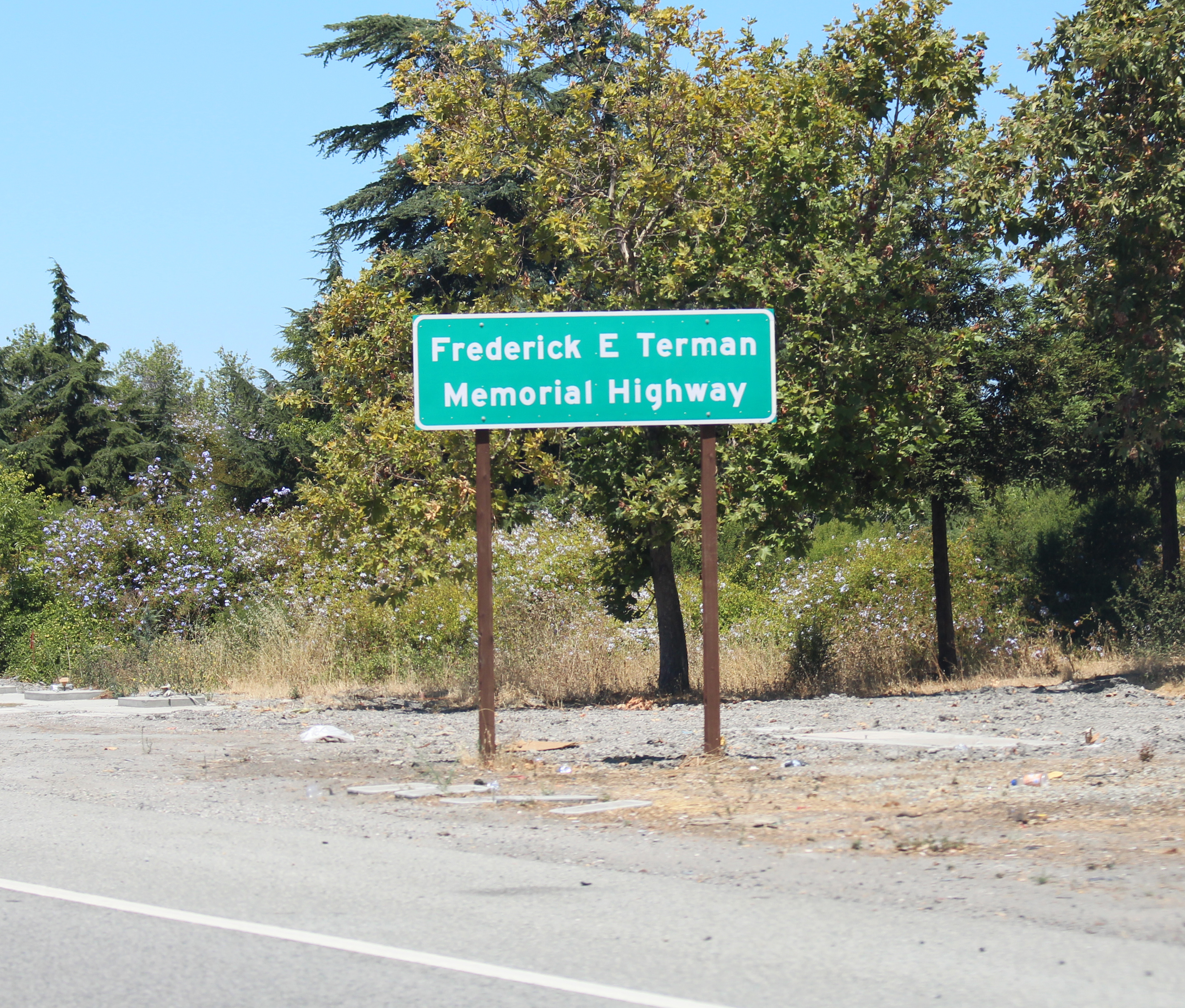
Frederick E. Terman Memorial Highway sign in Santa Clara County

Dozens of segments of US 101 in California are designated as memorial routes. Differing segments in Humboldt, Sonoma, Marin, and Monterey counties are named various forms of Veterans Memorial Highway, the segment between Ralston Avenue in Belmont and SR 92 is named Civilian Women Volunteer All Wars Memorial Freeway, a segment near Soledad State Prison is named Soledad State Prison Correctional Officers Memorial Highway, and a segment near Chualar is named Bracero Memorial Highway. Additionally, several memorial freeways and highways are named after individuals, most notably James Lick Memorial Freeway in San Francisco.

Many of US 101's individual features are also named, including interchanges (East Los Angeles Interchange, Four Level Interchange, Hollywood Split, Joe Colla Interchange), bridges and viaducts (Golden Gate Bridge, Confusion Hill Bridges, many others), and more. Some intersections have also been unofficially nicknamed, including East Los Angeles Interchange (Malfunction Junction, the Beast), Four Level Interchange (Four Letter Interchange), US 101/I‑80 (Alemany Maze), and US 101/Cesar Chavez Street/Bayshore Boulevard/Potrero Avenue (The Hairball). Furthermore, Bayshore Highway was unofficially nicknamed Bloody Bayshore before it was upgraded to freeway standards, and US 101 between Petaluma and Novato was known as Novato Narrows before HOV lanes were added in 2025.

Finally, because SR 1 is known as Pacific Coast Highway (or PCH for short), the segments of US 101 that run concurrently with it are also known by this name.

== Major intersections ==
Except where prefixed with a letter, postmiles were measured on the road as it was in 1964, based on the alignment that existed at the time, and do not necessarily reflect current mileage. Postmile prefixes include: R reflecting a realignment in the route since then, M indicating a second realignment, L referring to an overlap due to a correction or change, and T indicating postmiles classified as temporary. Segments that remain unconstructed or have been relinquished to local control may be omitted. The numbers reset at county lines; the start and end postmiles in each county are given in the county column.

County	Location	Postmile	Exit	Destinations	Notes
Los Angeles; LA S0.00-38.19	Los Angeles		—	I-5 south (Santa Ana Freeway south) – Santa Ana	No access to I‑5 north; southern terminus of US 101; southern end of East Los Angeles Interchange
Los Angeles; LA S0.00-38.19	Los Angeles		—	Euclid Avenue	Southbound exit and northbound entrance
Los Angeles; LA S0.00-38.19	Los Angeles		—	SR 60 east (Pomona Freeway) / Soto Street – Pomona	Southbound exit and northbound entrance; northern end of East Los Angeles Interchange proper; SR 60 west exit 1C
Los Angeles; LA S0.00-38.19	Los Angeles	S0.00	1A	Seventh Street	Southbound exit and northbound entrance
Los Angeles; LA S0.00-38.19	Los Angeles			Whittier Boulevard	Northbound entrance only
Los Angeles; LA S0.00-38.19	Los Angeles	S0.62	1A	Fourth Street	No northbound entrance; signed as exit 1B southbound
Los Angeles; LA S0.00-38.19	Los Angeles	S0.91	1B	First Street	No southbound entrance; signed as exit 1C southbound
Los Angeles; LA S0.00-38.19	Los Angeles		1C	Cesar Chavez Avenue	Northbound exit only; was formerly Brooklyn Avenue
Los Angeles; LA S0.00-38.19	Los Angeles	S1.33 0.00	1D	I-10 east (San Bernardino Freeway) – San Bernardino	No southbound entrance; San Bernardino Split portion of the East Los Angeles Interchange; access to I‑10 east via the San Bernardino Freeway spur; no access to I‑10 west; left exit southbound; I‑10 west exit 19B; former western terminus of US 60 / US 70; former US 99 south; former I‑110 east (1958–1965)
Los Angeles; LA S0.00-38.19	Los Angeles	0.10	1E	Mission Road	No northbound exit
Los Angeles; LA S0.00-38.19	Los Angeles	0.62	2A	Vignes Street	Northbound exit and entrance
Los Angeles; LA S0.00-38.19	Los Angeles	0.62– 0.82	2A-B	Alameda Street – Union Station	Signed as exit 2A southbound, 2B northbound
Los Angeles; LA S0.00-38.19	Los Angeles	0.82	2B	Los Angeles Street	No northbound exit
Los Angeles; LA S0.00-38.19	Los Angeles	1.10	2C	Spring Street	Northbound exit only
Los Angeles; LA S0.00-38.19	Los Angeles	1.10	2C	Broadway	Southbound exit and northbound entrance
Los Angeles; LA S0.00-38.19	Los Angeles	1.40	3A	Temple Street	Southbound exit and entrance
Los Angeles; LA S0.00-38.19	Los Angeles	1.57	3B	SR 110 (Arroyo Seco Parkway north, Harbor Freeway south) to I-110 south / Grand Avenue – Pasadena, San Pedro	Northern end of Santa Ana Freeway; southern end of Hollywood Freeway access to I‑110 south via SR 110 south; Four Level Interchange; Grand Avenue not signed southbound; signed as exit 3 northbound; SR 110 exit 24A
Los Angeles; LA S0.00-38.19	Los Angeles	2.48	4A	Glendale Boulevard, Echo Park Avenue, Union Avenue	Union Avenue not signed northbound; Echo Park Avenue not signed southbound
Los Angeles; LA S0.00-38.19	Los Angeles	2.86	4B	SR 2 east (Alvarado Street)	Southern end of SR 2 overlap
Los Angeles; LA S0.00-38.19	Los Angeles	3.34	5A	Rampart Boulevard, Benton Way	
Los Angeles; LA S0.00-38.19	Los Angeles	3.76	5B	Silver Lake Boulevard	
Los Angeles; LA S0.00-38.19	Los Angeles	4.40	6A	Vermont Avenue	
Los Angeles; LA S0.00-38.19	Los Angeles	4.85	6B	Melrose Avenue, Normandie Avenue	
Los Angeles; LA S0.00-38.19	Los Angeles	5.55	7	SR 2 west (Santa Monica Boulevard) / Western Avenue	Northern end of SR 2 overlap
Los Angeles; LA S0.00-38.19	Los Angeles	6.25	8A	Sunset Boulevard	No northbound entrance
Los Angeles; LA S0.00-38.19	Los Angeles	6.52	8B	Hollywood Boulevard	
Los Angeles; LA S0.00-38.19	Los Angeles	6.91	8C	Gower Street	
Los Angeles; LA S0.00-38.19	Los Angeles	7.06	9A	Vine Street	Southbound exit only
Los Angeles; LA S0.00-38.19	Los Angeles	7.46	9B	Cahuenga Boulevard – Hollywood Bowl	Signed as exit 9A northbound
Los Angeles; LA S0.00-38.19	Los Angeles	7.84	9C	Highland Avenue – Hollywood Bowl	Former SR 170 south; signed as exit 9B northbound
Los Angeles; LA S0.00-38.19	Los Angeles	8.84	Cahuenga Pass, elevation 745 feet (227 m)		
Los Angeles; LA S0.00-38.19	Los Angeles	9.22	11A	Barham Boulevard – Burbank	No southbound exit, which was permanently closed on October 17, 2015, due to weaving concerns with the construction of the new Universal Studios Boulevard southbound onramp.
Los Angeles; LA S0.00-38.19	Los Angeles	9.60	11B	Universal Studios Boulevard	No southbound exit; serves Universal Studios Hollywood
Los Angeles; LA S0.00-38.19	Los Angeles	10.34	12A	Lankershim Boulevard – Universal City	Serves Universal Studios Hollywood
Los Angeles; LA S0.00-38.19	Los Angeles	10.56	12B	Ventura Boulevard	No southbound exit
Los Angeles; LA S0.00-38.19	Los Angeles	11.11	12C	Vineland Avenue to SR 134 east – Pasadena	Signed as exit 12B southbound; "to SR 134" not signed southbound
Los Angeles; LA S0.00-38.19	Los Angeles			Moorpark Street	Northbound entrance only
Los Angeles; LA S0.00-38.19	Los Angeles	11.80	13	SR 170 north (Hollywood Freeway north) – Sacramento	Northbound left exit and southbound left entrance; southbound access is via exit 13A; US 101 north transitions onto Ventura Freeway west; southern end of Hollywood Split; SR 170 south exit 5A
Los Angeles; LA S0.00-38.19	Los Angeles	11.83	13A	Tujunga Avenue to SR 170 north	Southbound exit and northbound entrance
Los Angeles; LA S0.00-38.19	Los Angeles	11.65	13B	SR 134 east (Ventura Freeway east) – Pasadena	Southbound exit and northbound entrance; northbound access is via exit 12C; US 101 south transitions onto Hollywood Freeway south; northern end of Hollywood Split; SR 134 west exit 1A
Los Angeles; LA S0.00-38.19	Los Angeles	12.85	14	Laurel Canyon Boulevard – Studio City	
Los Angeles; LA S0.00-38.19	Los Angeles	13.88	15	Coldwater Canyon Avenue	
Los Angeles; LA S0.00-38.19	Los Angeles	14.89	16	Woodman Avenue	
Los Angeles; LA S0.00-38.19	Los Angeles	15.91	17	Van Nuys Boulevard	
Los Angeles; LA S0.00-38.19	Los Angeles	16.94	18	Sepulveda Boulevard	Northbound exit and southbound entrance
Los Angeles; LA S0.00-38.19	Los Angeles	17.17	19A	I-405 (San Diego Freeway) – Santa Monica, Sacramento	I‑405 exit 63B
Los Angeles; LA S0.00-38.19	Los Angeles	17.50	19B	Haskell Avenue	No southbound entrance
Los Angeles; LA S0.00-38.19	Los Angeles	18.61	20	Hayvenhurst Avenue	Northbound exit and southbound entrance
Los Angeles; LA S0.00-38.19	Los Angeles	19.22	21	Balboa Boulevard – Encino	
Los Angeles; LA S0.00-38.19	Los Angeles	20.23	22	White Oak Avenue	
Los Angeles; LA S0.00-38.19	Los Angeles	21.25	23	Reseda Boulevard	
Los Angeles; LA S0.00-38.19	Los Angeles	22.25	24	Tampa Avenue	
Los Angeles; LA S0.00-38.19	Los Angeles	23.26	25	Winnetka Avenue – Woodland Hills	
Los Angeles; LA S0.00-38.19	Los Angeles	24.31	26A	De Soto Avenue, Serrania Avenue	Signed as exit 26 southbound
Los Angeles; LA S0.00-38.19	Los Angeles	24.85	26B	Canoga Avenue	Northbound exit and southbound entrance
Los Angeles; LA S0.00-38.19	Los Angeles	25.34	27	SR 27 (Topanga Canyon Boulevard) / Ventura Boulevard	Signed as exits 27A (north) and 27B (south) northbound
Los Angeles; LA S0.00-38.19	Los Angeles	25.76	27C	Shoup Avenue	Northbound exit and southbound entrance
Los Angeles; LA S0.00-38.19	Los Angeles	26.45	28	Fallbrook Avenue	Southbound exit only
Los Angeles; LA S0.00-38.19	Los Angeles	26.86	28	Woodlake Avenue	Northbound exit and entrance
Los Angeles; LA S0.00-38.19	Los Angeles	27.36	29	Mulholland Drive, Valley Circle Boulevard	
Los Angeles; LA S0.00-38.19	Calabasas	28.29	30	Parkway Calabasas	
Los Angeles; LA S0.00-38.19	Calabasas	31.06	32	Las Virgenes Road (CR N1) – Malibu Canyon	
Los Angeles; LA S0.00-38.19	Calabasas	31.92	33	Lost Hills Road	
Los Angeles; LA S0.00-38.19	Agoura Hills	32.79	34	Liberty Canyon Road	
Los Angeles; LA S0.00-38.19	Agoura Hills		Wallis Annenberg Wildlife Crossing (planned to opened in early 2026)		
Los Angeles; LA S0.00-38.19	Agoura Hills	33.69	35	Chesebro Road	
Los Angeles; LA S0.00-38.19	Agoura Hills	35.04	36	Kanan Road (CR N9)	
Los Angeles; LA S0.00-38.19	Agoura Hills	36.18	38	Reyes Adobe Road	
Los Angeles; LA S0.00-38.19	Westlake Village	37.54	39	Lindero Canyon Road	
Ventura; VEN 0.00-R43.62	Thousand Oaks	0.70	40	SR 23 south (Westlake Boulevard)	Southern end of SR 23 overlap
Ventura; VEN 0.00-R43.62	Thousand Oaks	1.62	41	Hampshire Road	
Ventura; VEN 0.00-R43.62	Thousand Oaks	3.02	43A	Rancho Road	Signed as exit 43B northbound
Ventura; VEN 0.00-R43.62	Thousand Oaks	3.11	43B	SR 23 north (Moorpark Freeway) – Fillmore, Simi Valley	Northern end of SR 23 overlap; signed as exit 43A northbound; SR 23 south exits 12A-B; Simi Valley not signed southbound
Ventura; VEN 0.00-R43.62	Thousand Oaks	4.06	44	Moorpark Road	
Ventura; VEN 0.00-R43.62	Thousand Oaks	5.05	45	Lynn Road	
Ventura; VEN 0.00-R43.62	Thousand Oaks	6.19	46	Ventu Park Road – Newbury Park	
Ventura; VEN 0.00-R43.62	Thousand Oaks	7.02	47A	Rancho Conejo Boulevard, Borchard Road	Signed as exits 47A (Rancho Conejo Boulevard) and 47B (Borchard Road) northbound
Ventura; VEN 0.00-R43.62	Thousand Oaks	7.89	47B	Wendy Drive – Newbury Park	Signed as exit 47C northbound
Ventura; VEN 0.00-R43.62	Thousand Oaks	9.10	Conejo Weigh Station		
Ventura; VEN 0.00-R43.62	Camarillo	10.74	50	Camarillo Springs Road – Camarillo Grove County Park	Signed as exit 51 northbound
Ventura; VEN 0.00-R43.62	Camarillo	12.30	52	Santa Rosa Road, Pleasant Valley Road	
Ventura; VEN 0.00-R43.62	Camarillo	13.75	53A	Flynn Road	Northbound signage
Ventura; VEN 0.00-R43.62	Camarillo	13.75	53A	Dawson Drive	Southbound signage
Ventura; VEN 0.00-R43.62	Camarillo	13.85	53B	SR 34 (Lewis Road)	
Ventura; VEN 0.00-R43.62	Camarillo	14.80	54	Carmen Drive	
Ventura; VEN 0.00-R43.62	Camarillo	15.89	55	Las Posas Road	
Ventura; VEN 0.00-R43.62	Camarillo	16.79	56	Springville Drive	
Ventura; VEN 0.00-R43.62	Camarillo	17.75	57	Central Avenue	
Ventura; VEN 0.00-R43.62	Oxnard	19.17	59	Del Norte Boulevard	
Ventura; VEN 0.00-R43.62	Oxnard	20.08	60	SR 1 south (Rice Avenue) / Santa Clara Avenue	Southern end of SR 1 overlap
Ventura; VEN 0.00-R43.62	Oxnard	21.01	61	Rose Avenue	
Ventura; VEN 0.00-R43.62	Oxnard	22.01	62A	SR 232 (Vineyard Avenue) – Oxnard	
Ventura; VEN 0.00-R43.62	Oxnard	22.73	62B	Oxnard Boulevard	Former SR 1 south
Ventura; VEN 0.00-R43.62	Oxnard	R23.12	63A	Ventura Road	Southbound exit only
Ventura; VEN 0.00-R43.62	Ventura	R23.45	63B	Johnson Drive	Signed as exit 63 northbound
Ventura; VEN 0.00-R43.62	Ventura	R24.65	64	Victoria Avenue – Channel Islands Harbor	
Ventura; VEN 0.00-R43.62	Ventura	25.97	65	Telephone Road	Northbound entrance is via Main Street
Ventura; VEN 0.00-R43.62	Ventura	26.39	66A	SR 126 east (Santa Paula Freeway) – Santa Clarita	Signed as exit 66 southbound; southbound entrance is via exit 1C from SR 126 west; SR 126 west exit 1A
Ventura; VEN 0.00-R43.62	Ventura	26.72	66B	Main Street (US 101 Bus. north)	No southbound exit
Ventura; VEN 0.00-R43.62	Ventura	28.45	68	Seaward Avenue	
Ventura; VEN 0.00-R43.62	Ventura	29.45	69	Vista del Mar Drive, Sanjon Road	Northbound exit and southbound entrance
Ventura; VEN 0.00-R43.62	Ventura	30.15	70A	California Street, Ventura Avenue	
Ventura; VEN 0.00-R43.62	Ventura	30.91	70B	SR 33 north (Ojai Freeway) – Ojai	
Ventura; VEN 0.00-R43.62	Ventura	31.50	71	Main Street (US 101 Bus. south)	Southbound exit and northbound entrance
Ventura; VEN 0.00-R43.62		R32.70	72	SR 1 north (PCH) – State Beaches	Northern end of SR 1 overlap; northbound exit and southbound entrance
Ventura; VEN 0.00-R43.62		R38.98	78	SR 1 south (PCH) – Seacliff	Southern end of SR 1 overlap
Ventura; VEN 0.00-R43.62		R39.80	79	Mussel Shoals (Old Pacific Coast Highway)	Southbound exit and entrance
Ventura; VEN 0.00-R43.62		41.00	81	La Conchita (West Surfside Street)	Northbound exit and entrance
Ventura; VEN 0.00-R43.62		R43.57	83	Bates Road	
Ventura–Santa Barbara county line		R43.62 R0.00	Northwestern end of Ventura Freeway		
Santa Barbara; SB R0.00-90.99	Carpinteria	R0.63	84	SR 150 east – Ojai, Lake Casitas	
Santa Barbara; SB R0.00-90.99	Carpinteria	1.61	85	Bailard Avenue	
Santa Barbara; SB R0.00-90.99	Carpinteria	2.64	86A	Casitas Pass Road	Signed as exit 86 northbound; former SR 224
Santa Barbara; SB R0.00-90.99	Carpinteria	3.06	86B	Linden Avenue	Southbound exit and northbound entrance
Santa Barbara; SB R0.00-90.99	Carpinteria	3.77	87A	Reynolds Avenue, Santa Monica Road	Signed as exit 87 northbound
Santa Barbara; SB R0.00-90.99	Carpinteria	4.34	87B	Carpinteria Avenue	Southbound exit only
Santa Barbara; SB R0.00-90.99	Toro Canyon	R5.28	88	Santa Claus Lane, South Padaro Lane	South Padaro Lane not signed southbound
Santa Barbara; SB R0.00-90.99	Summerland	R7.14	90	Padaro Lane – Summerland	Signed as North Padaro Lane northbound
Santa Barbara; SB R0.00-90.99	Summerland	R8.26	91	Evans Avenue – Summerland	
Santa Barbara; SB R0.00-90.99	Montecito	9.00	92	Sheffield Drive	
Santa Barbara; SB R0.00-90.99	Montecito	10.02	93	San Ysidro Road	
Santa Barbara; SB R0.00-90.99	Montecito	10.54	94A	Olive Mill Road, Coast Village Road	No northbound entrance
Santa Barbara; SB R0.00-90.99	Santa Barbara	11.10	94B	Hermosillo Road	Northbound exit only
Santa Barbara; SB R0.00-90.99	Santa Barbara	11.41	94C	Cabrillo Boulevard, Coast Village Road	No southbound entrance; signed as exit 94B southbound; interchange is undergoing reconstruction between 2026 and 2028
Santa Barbara; SB R0.00-90.99	Santa Barbara		95	Los Patos Way (unsigned)	Former southbound exit only; demolished in 2026 during the reconstruction of the Cabrillo Boulevard interchange
Santa Barbara; SB R0.00-90.99	Santa Barbara	12.10	95	Salinas Street	Northbound exit and entrance
Santa Barbara; SB R0.00-90.99	Santa Barbara	12.75	96	Milpas Street	Former SR 144; northbound exit signed as exit 96A; southbound as exits 96B and 96A
Santa Barbara; SB R0.00-90.99	Santa Barbara	13.49	96	Laguna Street, Garden Street – Downtown Santa Barbara	Laguna Street/Garden Street northbound exit signed as exit 96B; Garden Street southbound exit signed as exit 96C
Santa Barbara; SB R0.00-90.99	Santa Barbara	R14.19	97	Bath Street, Castillo Street; Santa Barbara Harbor	
Santa Barbara; SB R0.00-90.99	Santa Barbara	R14.76	98A	Carrillo Street – Downtown Santa Barbara	Signed as exit 98 southbound
Santa Barbara; SB R0.00-90.99	Santa Barbara	15.26	98B	Arrellaga Street	Northbound exit and entrance
Santa Barbara; SB R0.00-90.99	Santa Barbara	R15.73	99A	Mission Street	Signed as exit 99 southbound
Santa Barbara; SB R0.00-90.99	Santa Barbara	16.05	99B	Pueblo Street	Northbound exit only
Santa Barbara; SB R0.00-90.99	Santa Barbara	16.55	100	Las Positas Road	Former SR 225
Santa Barbara; SB R0.00-90.99	Santa Barbara	17.78	101A	La Cumbre Road, Hope Avenue	
Santa Barbara; SB R0.00-90.99	Santa Barbara	18.38	101B	SR 154 west / State Street – Cachuma Lake	
Santa Barbara; SB R0.00-90.99	Eastern Goleta Valley	18.92	102	El Sueno Road	Northbound exit and entrance
Santa Barbara; SB R0.00-90.99	Eastern Goleta Valley	20.06	103	Turnpike Road	
Santa Barbara; SB R0.00-90.99	Goleta	21.15	104A	Patterson Avenue	Signed as exit 104 southbound
Santa Barbara; SB R0.00-90.99	Goleta	21.41	104B	SR 217 west – Airport, UCSB	Northbound exit and southbound entrance
Santa Barbara; SB R0.00-90.99	Goleta	22.53	105	Fairview Avenue	
Santa Barbara; SB R0.00-90.99	Goleta	23.72	107	Los Carneros Road	
Santa Barbara; SB R0.00-90.99	Goleta	24.77	108	Glen Annie Road, Storke Road	
Santa Barbara; SB R0.00-90.99	Goleta	26.91	110	Winchester Canyon Road, Hollister Avenue	All ramps are via Cathedral Oaks Road
Santa Barbara; SB R0.00-90.99			Northern end of freeway		
Santa Barbara; SB R0.00-90.99			Southern end of freeway		
Santa Barbara; SB R0.00-90.99		30.06	113	Dos Pueblos Canyon Road	
Santa Barbara; SB R0.00-90.99			Northern end of freeway		
Santa Barbara; SB R0.00-90.99			Southern end of freeway		
Santa Barbara; SB R0.00-90.99		32.84	116	El Capitan Ranch Road	
Santa Barbara; SB R0.00-90.99		33.85	117	El Capitan State Beach	
Santa Barbara; SB R0.00-90.99		36.62	120	Refugio Road – Refugio State Beach	
Santa Barbara; SB R0.00-90.99			Northern end of freeway		
Santa Barbara; SB R0.00-90.99	Gaviota	44.82	128	Mariposa Reina	Interchange
Santa Barbara; SB R0.00-90.99	Gaviota			Gaviota State Beach (Gaviota Beach Road)	At-grade intersection
Santa Barbara; SB R0.00-90.99	Gaviota Pass	46.30– 46.90	Gaviota Rest Area		
Santa Barbara; SB R0.00-90.99	Gaviota Pass	47.19	Gaviota Gorge Tunnel (northbound only)		
Santa Barbara; SB R0.00-90.99			Southern end of freeway		
Santa Barbara; SB R0.00-90.99	Las Cruces	R48.85	132	SR 1 north – Lompoc, Vandenberg SFB	Northern end of SR 1 overlap
Santa Barbara; SB R0.00-90.99			Northern end of freeway		
Santa Barbara; SB R0.00-90.99			Southern end of freeway		
Santa Barbara; SB R0.00-90.99	Buellton	R56.46	139	Santa Rosa Road	
Santa Barbara; SB R0.00-90.99	Buellton	R57.12	140A	SR 246 – Lompoc, Solvang	
Santa Barbara; SB R0.00-90.99	Buellton	R57.55	140B	McMurray Road, Avenue of the Flags	
Santa Barbara; SB R0.00-90.99			Northern end of freeway		
Santa Barbara; SB R0.00-90.99			Southern end of freeway		
Santa Barbara; SB R0.00-90.99		62.67	146	SR 154 east / Zaca Station Road – Los Olivos, Cachuma Lake	
Santa Barbara; SB R0.00-90.99			Northern end of freeway		
Santa Barbara; SB R0.00-90.99			Southern end of freeway		
Santa Barbara; SB R0.00-90.99	Los Alamos	70.92	154	SR 135 north – Los Alamos, Vandenberg SFB	
Santa Barbara; SB R0.00-90.99			Northern end of freeway		
Santa Barbara; SB R0.00-90.99			Southern end of freeway		
Santa Barbara; SB R0.00-90.99		78.69	161	Solomon Summit Undercrossing	
Santa Barbara; SB R0.00-90.99	Orcutt	82.18	164	Clark Avenue – Orcutt	
Santa Barbara; SB R0.00-90.99	Orcutt	83.42	166	Union Valley Parkway	
Santa Barbara; SB R0.00-90.99	Santa Maria	84.36	167	Santa Maria Way (US 101 Bus. north)	
Santa Barbara; SB R0.00-90.99	Santa Maria	86.59	169	Betteravia Road – Sisquoc	
Santa Barbara; SB R0.00-90.99	Santa Maria	87.60	170	Stowell Road	
Santa Barbara; SB R0.00-90.99	Santa Maria	88.60	171	SR 166 west (Main Street) – Santa Maria, Guadalupe	Southern end of SR 166 overlap
Santa Barbara; SB R0.00-90.99	Santa Maria	89.69	172	Donovan Road	
Santa Barbara; SB R0.00-90.99	Santa Maria	90.75	173	SR 135 south (Broadway, US 101 Bus. south) – Santa Maria	
San Luis Obispo; SLO 0.00-R69.32		0.81	175	SR 166 east – Maricopa, Bakersfield	Northern end of SR 166 overlap
San Luis Obispo; SLO 0.00-R69.32	Nipomo	4.85	179	Tefft Street – Nipomo	
San Luis Obispo; SLO 0.00-R69.32	Nipomo	6.43	180	Willow Road	
San Luis Obispo; SLO 0.00-R69.32	Nipomo	7.84	182	Thompson Road, Los Berros Road	
San Luis Obispo; SLO 0.00-R69.32			Northern end of freeway		
San Luis Obispo; SLO 0.00-R69.32			Southern end of freeway		
San Luis Obispo; SLO 0.00-R69.32	Arroyo Grande	12.52	186	Traffic Way (US 101 Bus. north), Fair Oaks Avenue	No northbound entrance
San Luis Obispo; SLO 0.00-R69.32	Arroyo Grande	13.17	187A	SR 227 north (Grand Avenue, US 101 Bus. south)	
San Luis Obispo; SLO 0.00-R69.32	Arroyo Grande	13.75	187B	Brisco Road, Halcyon Drive	
San Luis Obispo; SLO 0.00-R69.32	Pismo Beach	14.61	188	Oak Park Road	
San Luis Obispo; SLO 0.00-R69.32	Pismo Beach	15.58– 15.88	189	4th Street, Five Cities Drive	Signed as exits 189 (4th Street) and 190A (Five Cities Drive) southbound
San Luis Obispo; SLO 0.00-R69.32	Pismo Beach	16.62	190	Price Street (US 101 Bus. north)	No northbound entrance; northbound signage
San Luis Obispo; SLO 0.00-R69.32	Pismo Beach	16.62	190B	Hinds Avenue, Price Canyon Road	No northbound entrance; southbound signage
San Luis Obispo; SLO 0.00-R69.32	Pismo Beach	16.89	191A	Wadsworth Avenue	Northbound signage; northbound entrance via Bello Street, southbound entrance via Price Street
San Luis Obispo; SLO 0.00-R69.32	Pismo Beach	16.89	191A	SR 1 south – Pismo Beach	Southbound signage; north and south entrances via Price Street
San Luis Obispo; SLO 0.00-R69.32	Pismo Beach	17.76	191B	Shell Beach Road	Northbound signage
San Luis Obispo; SLO 0.00-R69.32	Pismo Beach	17.76	191B	Price Street (SR 1 south, US 101 Bus. south)	Southern end of SR 1 overlap; southbound signage
San Luis Obispo; SLO 0.00-R69.32	Pismo Beach	R19.81	193	Spyglass Drive	Northbound signage
San Luis Obispo; SLO 0.00-R69.32	Pismo Beach	R19.81	193	Shell Beach Road	Southbound signage
San Luis Obispo; SLO 0.00-R69.32	Avila Beach	R21.11	195	Avila Beach Drive	
San Luis Obispo; SLO 0.00-R69.32	Avila Beach	R22.29	196	San Luis Bay Drive – See Canyon, Avila Beach	
San Luis Obispo; SLO 0.00-R69.32		R24.30	198	Higuera Street	
San Luis Obispo; SLO 0.00-R69.32	San Luis Obispo	25.91	200A	Los Osos Valley Road	Signed as exit 200 southbound
San Luis Obispo; SLO 0.00-R69.32	San Luis Obispo	26.83	200B	Prado Road, Elks Lane	Northbound exit and entrance
San Luis Obispo; SLO 0.00-R69.32	San Luis Obispo	27.50	201	SR 227 south (Madonna Road)	
San Luis Obispo; SLO 0.00-R69.32	San Luis Obispo	28.07	202A	Marsh Street	
San Luis Obispo; SLO 0.00-R69.32	San Luis Obispo	28.81	202B	Broad Street	
San Luis Obispo; SLO 0.00-R69.32	San Luis Obispo	29.08	203A	Osos Street, Santa Rosa Street	
San Luis Obispo; SLO 0.00-R69.32	San Luis Obispo	29.08	203B	SR 1 north – Morro Bay, Hearst Castle	Northern end of SR 1 overlap
San Luis Obispo; SLO 0.00-R69.32	San Luis Obispo	29.40	203C	California Boulevard	
San Luis Obispo; SLO 0.00-R69.32	San Luis Obispo	29.77	203D	Grand Avenue – Cal Poly	Northbound exit and southbound entrance
San Luis Obispo; SLO 0.00-R69.32	San Luis Obispo	29.99	204	Monterey Street	No southbound entrance
San Luis Obispo; SLO 0.00-R69.32			Northern end of freeway		
San Luis Obispo; SLO 0.00-R69.32		35.00	Cuesta Pass, elevation 1,522 feet (464 m)		
San Luis Obispo; SLO 0.00-R69.32			Southern end of freeway		
San Luis Obispo; SLO 0.00-R69.32		37.85	211	SR 58 east – Santa Margarita	
San Luis Obispo; SLO 0.00-R69.32	Atascadero	42.27	216A	Santa Barbara Road	Signed as exit 216 southbound
San Luis Obispo; SLO 0.00-R69.32	Atascadero	42.90	216B	San Diego Way	Northbound exit and southbound entrance
San Luis Obispo; SLO 0.00-R69.32	Atascadero	44.01	218A	Santa Rosa Road	
San Luis Obispo; SLO 0.00-R69.32	Atascadero	44.84	218B	Curbaril Avenue	
San Luis Obispo; SLO 0.00-R69.32	Atascadero	45.57	219	SR 41 (Morro Road)	
San Luis Obispo; SLO 0.00-R69.32	Atascadero	45.96	220A	Traffic Way (US 101 Bus. north)	
San Luis Obispo; SLO 0.00-R69.32	Atascadero	46.87	220B	San Anselmo Road	
San Luis Obispo; SLO 0.00-R69.32	Atascadero	48.33	222	Del Rio Road (US 101 Bus. south)	
San Luis Obispo; SLO 0.00-R69.32	Atascadero	49.32	223	San Ramon Road, Santa Cruz Road	
San Luis Obispo; SLO 0.00-R69.32	Templeton	50.64	224	Vineyard Drive (US 101 Bus. north)	
San Luis Obispo; SLO 0.00-R69.32	Templeton	51.45	225	Las Tablas Road	
San Luis Obispo; SLO 0.00-R69.32	Templeton	52.44	226	Main Street (US 101 Bus. south)	
San Luis Obispo; SLO 0.00-R69.32	Paso Robles	53.89	228	SR 46 west – Cambria, Hearst Castle	Southern end of SR 46 overlap
San Luis Obispo; SLO 0.00-R69.32	Paso Robles	55.67	229	Spring Street (US 101 Bus. north)	Northbound exit and southbound entrance; former US 101
San Luis Obispo; SLO 0.00-R69.32	Paso Robles	56.14	230	Pine Street	Southbound exit and entrance
San Luis Obispo; SLO 0.00-R69.32	Paso Robles		230	Paso Robles Street	Northbound exit and entrance
San Luis Obispo; SLO 0.00-R69.32	Paso Robles	56.88	231A	17th Street	Southbound exit and entrance
San Luis Obispo; SLO 0.00-R69.32	Paso Robles	57.92	231B	SR 46 east (24th Street / CR G14 west) – Fresno, Bakersfield	Northern end of SR 46 overlap; signed as exit 231 northbound
San Luis Obispo; SLO 0.00-R69.32	Paso Robles	58.76	232	Spring Street (US 101 Bus. south)	No southbound entrance; former US 101
San Luis Obispo; SLO 0.00-R69.32			Northern end of freeway		
San Luis Obispo; SLO 0.00-R69.32			Southern end of freeway		
San Luis Obispo; SLO 0.00-R69.32	San Miguel	65.08	239A	Mission Street – San Miguel	Northbound exit and southbound left entrance
San Luis Obispo; SLO 0.00-R69.32	San Miguel	65.56	239B	10th Street	Signed as exit 239 southbound
San Luis Obispo; SLO 0.00-R69.32	San Miguel	67.23	241A	Mission Street – San Miguel	Southbound exit and northbound entrance
San Luis Obispo; SLO 0.00-R69.32		R67.71	241B	South Camp Roberts (Frontage Road)	Signed as exit 241 northbound; served the former south entrance to Camp Roberts
Monterey; MON R0.00-101.32		R0.84	244	Camp Roberts (main gate)	
Monterey; MON R0.00-101.32		R2.15	245	East Garrison (Bradley Road)	
Monterey; MON R0.00-101.32		R3.10– R5.10	Camp Roberts Rest Area		
Monterey; MON R0.00-101.32	Bradley	R7.94	251	Bradley (Bradley Road)	
Monterey; MON R0.00-101.32		R9.67	252	CR G18 (Jolon Road) – Fort Hunter Liggett	
Monterey; MON R0.00-101.32		R15.47	258	Alvarado Road	
Monterey; MON R0.00-101.32		R17.86	260	Los Lobos Road	
Monterey; MON R0.00-101.32		R21.99	263	Paris Valley Road – San Ardo	
Monterey; MON R0.00-101.32		R29.90	271	Paris Valley Road – Lockwood	
Monterey; MON R0.00-101.32	San Lucas	R32.02	273	SR 198 east – San Lucas, Coalinga	
Monterey; MON R0.00-101.32		R37.31	278	Wild Horse Road	
Monterey; MON R0.00-101.32	King City	R39.77	281	First Street (US 101 Bus. north / CR G15 to CR G13)	
Monterey; MON R0.00-101.32	King City	R40.72	282A	Canal Street	
Monterey; MON R0.00-101.32	King City	R41.18	282B	Broadway (US 101 Bus. south / CR G13)	
Monterey; MON R0.00-101.32		R41.95	283	CR G14 (Jolon Road) – Fort Hunter Liggett	
Monterey; MON R0.00-101.32			Northern end of freeway		
Monterey; MON R0.00-101.32			Southern end of freeway		
Monterey; MON R0.00-101.32	Greenfield	52.66	293	Espinosa Road (US 101 Bus. north, CR G16)	Former US 101
Monterey; MON R0.00-101.32	Greenfield	53.36	294A	Oak Avenue	
Monterey; MON R0.00-101.32	Greenfield	53.86	294B	Walnut Avenue	
Monterey; MON R0.00-101.32	Greenfield	54.79	295	Thorne Road (US 101 Bus. south)	Former US 101
Monterey; MON R0.00-101.32			Northern end of freeway		
Monterey; MON R0.00-101.32			Southern end of freeway		
Monterey; MON R0.00-101.32	Soledad	60.40	301	Arroyo Seco Road	
Monterey; MON R0.00-101.32	Soledad	61.59	302	SR 146 (US 101 Bus. north) – Soledad	Former US 101
Monterey; MON R0.00-101.32	Soledad	62.70	303	Front Street (US 101 Bus. south)	
Monterey; MON R0.00-101.32		64.63	305	Camphora Gloria Road	
Monterey; MON R0.00-101.32		66.40	307	Salinas Valley State Prison	
Monterey; MON R0.00-101.32	Gonzales	69.37	310	Gloria Road (US 101 Bus. north), Alta Street	Former US 101
Monterey; MON R0.00-101.32	Gonzales	70.86	311	5th Street	
Monterey; MON R0.00-101.32	Gonzales	72.61	313	Old Stage Road (US 101 Bus. south)	
Monterey; MON R0.00-101.32			Northern end of freeway		
Monterey; MON R0.00-101.32			Southern end of freeway		
Monterey; MON R0.00-101.32	Chualar	76.97	317	Chualar (Main Street)	
Monterey; MON R0.00-101.32			Northern end of freeway		
Monterey; MON R0.00-101.32		82.47	323	Abbott Street (US 101 Bus. north) – Spreckels	Northbound left exit and southbound left entrance; interchange
Monterey; MON R0.00-101.32			Southern end of freeway		
Monterey; MON R0.00-101.32	Salinas	85.62	326A	Airport Boulevard	
Monterey; MON R0.00-101.32	Salinas		326B	Fairview Avenue	Northbound exit only
Monterey; MON R0.00-101.32	Salinas	86.12	326C	Monterey Peninsula (South Sanborn Road)	Signed as exit 326B southbound
Monterey; MON R0.00-101.32	Salinas	86.82	327	SR 68 (John Street)	
Monterey; MON R0.00-101.32	Salinas	87.30	328	Market Street to SR 183 – Santa Cruz	
Monterey; MON R0.00-101.32	Salinas	R88.24	329	Main Street (SR 183, US 101 Bus. south)	
Monterey; MON R0.00-101.32	Salinas	R89.27	330	Laurel Drive	
Monterey; MON R0.00-101.32	Salinas	R91.01	331	Boronda Road (US 101 Bus. south)	
Monterey; MON R0.00-101.32		92.19	333	Sala Road	
Monterey; MON R0.00-101.32			Northern end of freeway		
Monterey; MON R0.00-101.32	Prunedale	95.44	336	SR 156 west / Vierra Canyon Road – Monterey Peninsula	Southern end of SR 156 overlap; interchange
Monterey; MON R0.00-101.32	Prunedale	96.14	337	San Miguel Canyon Road (CR G12)	Interchange
Monterey; MON R0.00-101.32	Prunedale	98.37	339	Crazy Horse Canyon Road, Echo Valley Road	Interchange
Monterey; MON R0.00-101.32	Prunedale	100.39		Dunbarton Road to San Juan Road (CR G11)	Closed in 2015 after the construction of the San Juan Road interchange
San Benito; SBT 0.00-R7.52		0.13	342	San Juan Road (CR G11) – Aromas, Watsonville	Interchange
San Benito; SBT 0.00-R7.52			Southern end of freeway		
San Benito; SBT 0.00-R7.52		3.01	345	SR 156 east – San Juan Bautista, Hollister	Northern end of SR 156 overlap
San Benito; SBT 0.00-R7.52		R4.90	347	SR 129 west – Watsonville, Santa Cruz	
San Benito; SBT 0.00-R7.52		R6.49	349	Betabel Road, Y Road	
San Benito; SBT 0.00-R7.52			Northern end of freeway		
Santa Clara; SCL R0.03-52.55		3.16	353	SR 25 south – Hollister, Pinnacles National Park	Interchange
Santa Clara; SCL R0.03-52.55			Southern end of freeway		
Santa Clara; SCL R0.03-52.55	Gilroy	R4.94	355	Monterey Road (US 101 Bus. north)	
Santa Clara; SCL R0.03-52.55	Gilroy	R6.08	356	SR 152 east (Pacheco Pass Road) / 10th Street	Southern end of SR 152 overlap
Santa Clara; SCL R0.03-52.55	Gilroy	R7.53	357	SR 152 west (Leavesley Road / CR G9) – Gilroy	Northern end of SR 152 overlap
Santa Clara; SCL R0.03-52.55	Gilroy	R8.90	Southbound Gilroy Weigh Station		
Santa Clara; SCL R0.03-52.55	San Martin	R10.27	360	Masten Avenue	
Santa Clara; SCL R0.03-52.55	San Martin	R11.40	Northbound Gilroy Weigh Station		
Santa Clara; SCL R0.03-52.55	San Martin	R12.46	362	San Martin Avenue	
Santa Clara; SCL R0.03-52.55	Morgan Hill	R15.07	365	Tennant Avenue	
Santa Clara; SCL R0.03-52.55	Morgan Hill	R16.01	366	East Dunne Avenue	
Santa Clara; SCL R0.03-52.55	Morgan Hill	R17.82	367	Cochrane Road (US 101 Bus. south)	
Santa Clara; SCL R0.03-52.55	San Jose	R21.25	371	Coyote Creek Golf Drive	
Santa Clara; SCL R0.03-52.55	San Jose	R23.10	373	Bailey Avenue	
Santa Clara; SCL R0.03-52.55	San Jose	R26.78	377A	SR 85 north (West Valley Freeway) – Mountain View, Cupertino	No northbound entrance; signed as exit 377B southbound; SR 85 south exit 1A
Santa Clara; SCL R0.03-52.55	San Jose		♦	SR 85 north	HOV access only; northbound exit and southbound entrance
Santa Clara; SCL R0.03-52.55	San Jose	R27.00	377B	Silicon Valley Boulevard, Bernal Road	Signed as exit 377A southbound
Santa Clara; SCL R0.03-52.55	San Jose	R28.61	378	Blossom Hill Road (CR G10) / Silver Creek Valley Road	Southern end of Bayshore Freeway; former SR 82
Santa Clara; SCL R0.03-52.55	San Jose	30.10	380	Hellyer Avenue	
Santa Clara; SCL R0.03-52.55	San Jose	31.00	381	Yerba Buena Road	Southbound exit was separated from Exit 382 in 2014
Santa Clara; SCL R0.03-52.55	San Jose	31.70	382	Capitol Expressway (CR G21)	
Santa Clara; SCL R0.03-52.55	San Jose	33.03	383	Tully Road	
Santa Clara; SCL R0.03-52.55	San Jose	34.11	384	I-280 north / I-680 north – Downtown San Jose, Sacramento	Northbound exit and southbound entrance; southern end of Joe Colla Interchange; ramps extend over the Story Road interchange; I‑680 exit 1B
Santa Clara; SCL R0.03-52.55	San Jose	34.55	385A	Story Road	Signed as exit 385 northbound
Santa Clara; SCL R0.03-52.55	San Jose	34.87	385B	I-280 north / I-680 north – San Francisco, Downtown San Jose, Sacramento	Southbound exit and northbound entrance; northern end of Joe Colla Interchange; I‑680 exit 1B
Santa Clara; SCL R0.03-52.55	San Jose	R35.76	386A	Alum Rock Avenue, Santa Clara Street	Alum Rock Avenue is former SR 130
Santa Clara; SCL R0.03-52.55	San Jose	R36.14	386B	McKee Road, Julian Street	
Santa Clara; SCL R0.03-52.55	San Jose			Mabury Road, Berryessa Road	Planned interchange
Santa Clara; SCL R0.03-52.55	San Jose	37.73	388A	Oakland Road, 13th Street	Former SR 238
Santa Clara; SCL R0.03-52.55	San Jose	38.30	388B	I-880 north (Nimitz Freeway) – Oakland	I‑880 exits 4B-C; former SR 17
Santa Clara; SCL R0.03-52.55	San Jose	38.30	388C	I-880 south (Nimitz Freeway) – Santa Cruz	I‑880 exits 4B-C; former SR 17
Santa Clara; SCL R0.03-52.55	San Jose	38.80	389A	Old Bayshore Highway, 4th Street	No southbound exit
Santa Clara; SCL R0.03-52.55	San Jose	39.29	389B	Brokaw Road, First Street	Signed as exit 389 southbound
Santa Clara; SCL R0.03-52.55	San Jose	39.93	390	SR 87 south (Guadalupe Parkway)	Southbound exit and northbound entrance; SR 87 north exit 9B
Santa Clara; SCL R0.03-52.55	San Jose–Santa Clara line	40.70	391	Trimble Road, De la Cruz Boulevard (CR G6)	
Santa Clara; SCL R0.03-52.55	Santa Clara	41.98	392	San Tomas Expressway, Montague Expressway (CR G4)	
Santa Clara; SCL R0.03-52.55	Santa Clara	42.73	393	Great America Parkway, Bowers Avenue	
Santa Clara; SCL R0.03-52.55	Sunnyvale	43.85	394	Lawrence Expressway (CR G2)	
Santa Clara; SCL R0.03-52.55	Sunnyvale	44.83	395	Fair Oaks Avenue	Signed as exits 395A (north) and 395B (south) southbound
Santa Clara; SCL R0.03-52.55	Sunnyvale	45.68	396A	Mathilda Avenue to SR 237 east	Former SR 85
Santa Clara; SCL R0.03-52.55	Sunnyvale		—	US 101 Express Lanes	Southern end of Express Lanes
Santa Clara; SCL R0.03-52.55	Sunnyvale	46.13	396B	SR 237 east – Milpitas	Southbound exit and northbound entrance; SR 237 west exit 3A
Santa Clara; SCL R0.03-52.55	Sunnyvale	46.13	396C	SR 237 west – Mountain View	Northbound exit and southbound entrance; SR 237 east exit 3A
Santa Clara; SCL R0.03-52.55	Mountain View	47.01	397	Ellis Street	
Santa Clara; SCL R0.03-52.55	Mountain View	47.89	398A	Moffett Boulevard, NASA Parkway	Signed as exit 398 northbound
Santa Clara; SCL R0.03-52.55	Mountain View		—	SR 85 Express Lanes south	Express Lanes access only; southbound exit and northbound entrance
Santa Clara; SCL R0.03-52.55	Mountain View	48.10	398B	SR 85 south – Cupertino, Santa Cruz	Southbound exit and northbound entrance; northbound exit is via exit 396C; SR 85 north exit 24B
Santa Clara; SCL R0.03-52.55	Mountain View	48.60	399A	Shoreline Boulevard	Signed as exit 399 southbound
Santa Clara; SCL R0.03-52.55	Mountain View	48.97	399B	Old Middlefield Way	Northbound exit and southbound entrance
Santa Clara; SCL R0.03-52.55	Mountain View	49.61	400A	Amphitheatre Parkway, Rengstorff Avenue	Signed as exits 400A (Amphitheatre Parkway) and 400B (Rengstorff Avenue) northbound
Santa Clara; SCL R0.03-52.55	Mountain View–Palo Alto line	50.32	400C	San Antonio Road	Signed as exits 400B (north) and 400C (south) southbound
Santa Clara; SCL R0.03-52.55	Palo Alto	52.01	402	Oregon Expressway (CR G3)	
Santa Clara; SCL R0.03-52.55	Palo Alto	52.17	402	Embarcadero Road	
San Mateo; SM 0.00-26.11	East Palo Alto	0.89	403	University Avenue (to SR 109)	
San Mateo; SM 0.00-26.11	East Palo Alto–Menlo Park line	1.87	404	Willow Road (SR 114)	
San Mateo; SM 0.00-26.11	Menlo Park	3.59	406	SR 84 east (Marsh Road) – Dumbarton Bridge	Southern end of SR 84 overlap
San Mateo; SM 0.00-26.11	Redwood City	5.39	408	SR 84 west (Woodside Road) / Seaport Boulevard	Northern end of SR 84 overlap
San Mateo; SM 0.00-26.11	Redwood City	6.62	409	Whipple Avenue	
San Mateo; SM 0.00-26.11	San Carlos		411	Brittan Avenue	Southbound exit and entrance
San Mateo; SM 0.00-26.11	San Carlos	8.40	411	Holly Street, Redwood Shores Parkway	
San Mateo; SM 0.00-26.11	San Carlos		412	Harbor Boulevard	Southbound exit and entrance
San Mateo; SM 0.00-26.11	Belmont	9.55	412	Marine Parkway, Ralston Avenue	Former Legislative Route 214
San Mateo; SM 0.00-26.11	San Mateo	11.15	414A	Hillsdale Boulevard – Foster City	
San Mateo; SM 0.00-26.11	San Mateo	11.90	414B	SR 92 – Hayward, San Mateo Bridge, Half Moon Bay	SR 92 exits 13A-B
San Mateo; SM 0.00-26.11	San Mateo	11.90	414B	Fashion Island Boulevard	No northbound exit
San Mateo; SM 0.00-26.11	San Mateo	12.69	415	Kehoe Avenue	Northbound exit and entrance
San Mateo; SM 0.00-26.11	San Mateo	13.46	416	3rd Avenue	Former SR 92
San Mateo; SM 0.00-26.11	San Mateo	14.33	417A	Dore Avenue	Northbound exit only
San Mateo; SM 0.00-26.11	San Mateo	14.33	417	Poplar Avenue	Southbound exit and entrance
San Mateo; SM 0.00-26.11	San Mateo	14.69	417B	Peninsula Avenue – Burlingame	Northbound exit and entrance
San Mateo; SM 0.00-26.11	Burlingame	16.02	419A	Anza Boulevard	Northbound exit and entrance
San Mateo; SM 0.00-26.11	Burlingame	16.58	419B	Broadway	Signed as exit 419 southbound
San Mateo; SM 0.00-26.11	Millbrae	17.95	421	Millbrae Avenue	Signed as exit 420 southbound
San Mateo; SM 0.00-26.11	San Bruno	19.12	422	San Francisco International Airport	Southbound exit is part of exit 423A
San Mateo; SM 0.00-26.11	San Bruno	R20.39	423A	San Bruno Avenue	
San Mateo; SM 0.00-26.11	San Bruno	R20.72	—	US 101 Express Lanes	Northern end of Express Lanes
San Mateo; SM 0.00-26.11	San Bruno	R20.72	423B	I-380 west to I-280 – San Bruno	I‑380 west exit 6, east exits 6A-B
San Mateo; SM 0.00-26.11	South San Francisco	R20.72	423C	North Access Road (I‑380 east) – North Cargo Area	Southbound exit is part of exit 423A
San Mateo; SM 0.00-26.11	South San Francisco	21.69	424	South Airport Boulevard	
San Mateo; SM 0.00-26.11	South San Francisco	21.92	425A	Grand Avenue – Downtown South San Francisco	No southbound entrance
San Mateo; SM 0.00-26.11	South San Francisco	22.71	425B	Oyster Point Boulevard	
San Mateo; SM 0.00-26.11	South San Francisco		425C	South San Francisco (Airport Boulevard)	Southbound exit and entrance
San Mateo; SM 0.00-26.11	Brisbane	23.39	426A	Brisbane, Cow Palace (Bayshore Boulevard)	Northbound exit only
San Mateo; SM 0.00-26.11	Brisbane	23.66	426B	Sierra Point Parkway, Marina Boulevard	Signed as exit 426 southbound; southbound exit and entrance are located 1.2 miles (1.9 km) north of northbound exit and entrance
City and County of San Francisco; SF 0.00-11.18		0.03	429A	Tunnel Avenue – Candlestick Park	
City and County of San Francisco; SF 0.00-11.18		0.77	429B	Third Street – Cow Palace	
City and County of San Francisco; SF 0.00-11.18		1.11	429C	Paul Avenue	No northbound entrance; signed as exit 430A southbound
City and County of San Francisco; SF 0.00-11.18		1.44	430A	I-280 – Daly City, Downtown San Francisco	Northbound exit and southbound entrance; southern end of Alemany Maze; ramps extend over the Silver Avenue interchange; I‑280 north exit 54A, south exit 54
City and County of San Francisco; SF 0.00-11.18		1.77	430B	Silver Avenue	No northbound entrance
City and County of San Francisco; SF 0.00-11.18		1.98	431	I-280 south – Daly City	Southbound exit and northbound entrance; northern end of Alemany Maze; I‑280 north exit 54B
City and County of San Francisco; SF 0.00-11.18		2.00	431	Alemany Boulevard, Bayshore Boulevard	
City and County of San Francisco; SF 0.00-11.18		2.92	432	Cesar Chavez Street, Potrero Avenue	Cesar Chavez Street was formerly Army Street
City and County of San Francisco; SF 0.00-11.18		4.10	433A	Vermont Street	Northbound exit only
City and County of San Francisco; SF 0.00-11.18		R4.24	433B	I-80 east – Bay Bridge, Oakland	Northern end of Bayshore Freeway; southern end of Central Freeway; signed as exit 433 southbound; I‑80 exits 1A-B
City and County of San Francisco; SF 0.00-11.18		R4.55	433C	Ninth Street – Civic Center	Northbound exit and southbound entrance
City and County of San Francisco; SF 0.00-11.18		T5.20	434A	Duboce Avenue	Northbound exit and southbound entrance
City and County of San Francisco; SF 0.00-11.18		5.40	434B	Octavia Boulevard to Fell Street	Northbound exit and southbound entrance
City and County of San Francisco; SF 0.00-11.18			Northern end of Central Freeway		
City and County of San Francisco; SF 0.00-11.18				Market Street	No left turns
City and County of San Francisco; SF 0.00-11.18				Geary Boulevard	No left turn from northbound US 101
City and County of San Francisco; SF 0.00-11.18				Broadway	No left turns from Broadway; no left turn from northbound US 101
City and County of San Francisco; SF 0.00-11.18				Van Ness Avenue, Lombard Street	No left turn from southbound Van Ness Avenue; no left turn from westbound Lombard Street
City and County of San Francisco; SF 0.00-11.18			Southern end of Presidio Parkway		
City and County of San Francisco; SF 0.00-11.18			Southern end of freeway		
City and County of San Francisco; SF 0.00-11.18		L8.59	437	Marina Boulevard, Girard Road – Marina, Presidio	
City and County of San Francisco; SF 0.00-11.18		9.40	438	SR 1 south (Park Presidio Boulevard) – Golden Gate Park	Southern end of SR 1 overlap
City and County of San Francisco; SF 0.00-11.18		9.71	439	Lincoln Boulevard – View Area, Presidio, Golden Gate NRA, Fort Point	Northern end of Presidio Parkway; Lincoln Boulevard not signed northbound
Golden Gate		11.18– L0.01	Golden Gate Bridge (Southbound toll only; no state maintenance on bridge)		
Marin; MRN L0.00-27.63	Sausalito	0.10	H. Dana Bower Rest Area and Vista Point (northbound only); southern end of Redwood Highway		
Marin; MRN L0.00-27.63	Sausalito	0.32	442	Alexander Avenue	Last free exit for southbound traffic
Marin; MRN L0.00-27.63	Sausalito	0.89	Robin Williams Tunnel under Waldo Grade		
Marin; MRN L0.00-27.63	Sausalito	1.52	443	Spencer Avenue, Monte Mar Drive	
Marin; MRN L0.00-27.63	Sausalito	2.48	444	Rodeo Avenue (east)	Northbound exit and entrance only
Marin; MRN L0.00-27.63	Sausalito	2.48	444	Rodeo Avenue (west)	Southbound exit and entrance only; connects to the Rodeo Trailhead at the Golden Gate NRA
Marin; MRN L0.00-27.63	Sausalito	3.33	445A	Sausalito (Bridgeway), Marin City (Donahue Street)	
Marin; MRN L0.00-27.63	Sausalito	4.46	445B	SR 1 north – Mill Valley, Stinson Beach	Northern end of SR 1 overlap; Mill Valley not signed southbound
Marin; MRN L0.00-27.63	Strawberry	4.78	446	Seminary Drive	
Marin; MRN L0.00-27.63	Strawberry			Redwood Highway Frontage Road (unsigned)	Southbound exit only
Marin; MRN L0.00-27.63	Strawberry	5.70	447	SR 131 east (Tiburon Boulevard) / East Blithedale Avenue	
Marin; MRN L0.00-27.63	Corte Madera			Casa Buena Drive	Southbound entrance only
Marin; MRN L0.00-27.63	Corte Madera	7.37	449A	Paradise Drive, Tamalpais Drive	Signed as exit 449 northbound
Marin; MRN L0.00-27.63	Corte Madera	7.66	449B	Madera Boulevard	Southbound exit and entrance
Marin; MRN L0.00-27.63	Corte Madera	8.02	450A	Lucky Drive, Doherty Drive	Doherty Drive not signed northbound
Marin; MRN L0.00-27.63	Larkspur	8.60	450B	San Anselmo, Richmond Bridge	Northbound signage
Marin; MRN L0.00-27.63	Larkspur	8.60	450B	Sir Francis Drake Boulevard	Southbound signage
Marin; MRN L0.00-27.63	San Rafael	9.63	451A	Andersen Drive, Francisco Boulevard	Southbound exit and entrance
Marin; MRN L0.00-27.63	San Rafael	10.00	451	Francisco Boulevard to I-580 east – Richmond Bridge	Northbound exit only
Marin; MRN L0.00-27.63	San Rafael	10.00	451B	I-580 east – Richmond Bridge, Oakland	Southbound exit and northbound entrance; I‑580 west exit 1A; former SR 17 south
Marin; MRN L0.00-27.63	San Rafael	10.72	452	Central San Rafael (Second Street, Mission Avenue)	
Marin; MRN L0.00-27.63	San Rafael	12.19	454A	Lincoln Avenue	No northbound exit
Marin; MRN L0.00-27.63	San Rafael	12.69	454B	North San Pedro Road	Signed as exit 454 northbound
Marin; MRN L0.00-27.63	San Rafael	13.71	455	Freitas Parkway – Terra Linda	
Marin; MRN L0.00-27.63	San Rafael	14.10	Terra Linda Weigh Station (northbound only)		
Marin; MRN L0.00-27.63	San Rafael	14.71	456	Lucas Valley Road, Smith Ranch Road	
Marin; MRN L0.00-27.63	San Rafael	15.20	St. Vincent's Weigh Station (southbound only)		
Marin; MRN L0.00-27.63		15.57	457	St. Vincent Drive, Miller Creek Road	
Marin; MRN L0.00-27.63	Novato	16.64	458	Nave Drive	Northbound signage
Marin; MRN L0.00-27.63	Novato	16.64	458	Alameda del Prado	Southbound signage
Marin; MRN L0.00-27.63	Novato	18.09	459	Ignacio Boulevard, Bel Marin Keys Boulevard, Entrada Drive – Hamilton Field	Entrada Drive, Hamilton Field not signed northbound; signed as exits 459A (Bel Marin Keys Boulevard, Hamilton Field) and 459B (Ignacio Boulevard, Entrada Drive) southbound
Marin; MRN L0.00-27.63	Novato	18.94	460	SR 37 east / South Novato Boulevard – Napa, Vallejo	Signed as exits 460A (SR 37) and 460B (South Novato Boulevard) northbound
Marin; MRN L0.00-27.63	Novato	R20.19	462A	Rowland Boulevard (US 101 Bus. north)	
Marin; MRN L0.00-27.63	Novato	R21.11	462B	De Long Avenue	Serves Downtown Novato
Marin; MRN L0.00-27.63	Novato	R22.00	463	Atherton Avenue, San Marin Drive (US 101 Bus. south)	
Marin; MRN L0.00-27.63		26.90	467	San Antonio Road, Silveira Ranch Road	
Sonoma		2.94	472A	Petaluma Boulevard South (US 101 Bus. north), Kastania Road	
Sonoma	Petaluma	3.58	472B	SR 116 east – Sonoma, Napa	Southern end of SR 116 overlap
Sonoma	Petaluma	4.76	474	East Washington Street – Central Petaluma	
Sonoma	Petaluma	5.76	476	Old Redwood Highway, Petaluma Boulevard North (US 101 Bus. south) – Penngrove	Vilho Ahola Memorial Interchange
Sonoma				Stony Point Road	Southbound entrance only
Sonoma		10.67	479	Railroad Avenue	Northbound exit only
Sonoma	Cotati	12.00	481A	West Sierra Avenue	Northbound exit and southbound entrance
Sonoma	Cotati	12.69	481B	SR 116 west (Gravenstein Highway) – Rohnert Park, Sebastopol, Cotati	Northern end of SR 116 overlap; signed as exit 481 southbound
Sonoma	Rohnert Park	13.88	483	Rohnert Park Expressway	
Sonoma	Rohnert Park	15.02	484A	Golf Course Drive, Wilfred Avenue	Signed as exit 484 southbound
Sonoma		15.53	484B	Santa Rosa Avenue (US 101 Bus. north)	Northbound exit and southbound entrance
Sonoma		16.54	485	Todd Road	
Sonoma	Santa Rosa	18.49	487	Yolanda Avenue, Hearn Avenue	Yolanda Avenue not signed southbound
Sonoma	Santa Rosa	19.00	488A	Baker Avenue	Northbound signage
Sonoma	Santa Rosa	19.00	488A	Corby Avenue, Santa Rosa Avenue	Southbound signage
Sonoma	Santa Rosa	19.66	488B	SR 12 – Sebastopol, Sonoma	SR 12 west exits 7A-B, east exit 7
Sonoma	Santa Rosa	20.09	489	Third Street – Downtown Santa Rosa	Third Street not signed southbound
Sonoma	Santa Rosa	20.74	490	College Avenue	
Sonoma	Santa Rosa	21.74	491A	Steele Lane, Guerneville Road	Signed as exit 491 southbound
Sonoma	Santa Rosa	22.52	491B	Bicentennial Way	Northbound exit and southbound entrance
Sonoma	Santa Rosa	22.81	492	Mendocino Avenue (US 101 Bus. south), Old Redwood Highway, Hopper Avenue	Hopper Avenue not signed northbound; Old Redwood Highway not signed southbound
Sonoma		24.86	494	River Road – Guerneville, Calistoga	
Sonoma		25.90	495A	Fulton Road – Fulton	Closed after the reconstruction of the Airport Boulevard interchange
Sonoma		26.33	495	Airport Boulevard, Fulton Road – Fulton	
Sonoma	Windsor	27.62	496	Shiloh Road	
Sonoma	Windsor	29.35	498	Old Redwood Highway – Central Windsor	
Sonoma	Windsor	30.67	499	Arata Lane	No northbound entrance
Sonoma	Healdsburg	33.48	502	Healdsburg Avenue	Northbound signage
Sonoma	Healdsburg	33.48	502	Old Redwood Highway	Southbound signage
Sonoma	Healdsburg	34.55	503	Central Healdsburg (Healdsburg Avenue)	Northbound exit and southbound entrance
Sonoma	Healdsburg	34.88	504	Westside Road – Guerneville	Southbound exit and northbound entrance
Sonoma	Healdsburg	36.27	505	Dry Creek Road	
Sonoma		R38.56	507	Lytton Springs Road, Alexander Valley Road	
Sonoma		R40.03	509	Independence Lane	
Sonoma	Geyserville	R41.43	510	Geyserville Avenue to SR 128 east – Geyserville	
Sonoma	Geyserville	R43.37	512	SR 128 east / Canyon Road (CR C1) – Geyserville, Calistoga	Southern end of SR 128 overlap
Sonoma		R47.85	517	Asti (Asti Road)	
Sonoma		R49.05	518	Dutcher Creek Road – Stewarts Point	
Sonoma	Cloverdale	R50.43	519	South Cloverdale Boulevard (US 101 Bus. north, SR 128 Bus. west)	
Sonoma	Cloverdale	R51.62	520	Citrus Fair Drive	
Sonoma		R53.40	522	SR 128 west (US 101 Bus. south) – Fort Bragg, Mendocino	Northern end of SR 128 overlap
Mendocino; MEN R0.10-T106.80		0.48	525	Geysers Road	
Mendocino; MEN R0.10-T106.80			Northern end of freeway		
Mendocino; MEN R0.10-T106.80	Hopland	10.89		SR 175 east – Lakeport	
Mendocino; MEN R0.10-T106.80			Southern end of freeway		
Mendocino; MEN R0.10-T106.80		19.68	544	Burke Hill Drive	
Mendocino; MEN R0.10-T106.80		20.71	545	Cox-Shrader Road	
Mendocino; MEN R0.10-T106.80		R21.59	546	SR 253 west – Ukiah, Boonville	
Mendocino; MEN R0.10-T106.80	Ukiah	R23.45	548A	Talmage (SR 222)	
Mendocino; MEN R0.10-T106.80	Ukiah	R24.06	548B	Gobbi Street	
Mendocino; MEN R0.10-T106.80	Ukiah	R24.53	549	Perkins Street, Vichy Springs Road – Central Ukiah	
Mendocino; MEN R0.10-T106.80	Ukiah	R26.16	551	North State Street – Ukiah	
Mendocino; MEN R0.10-T106.80		27.41	552	Lake Mendocino Drive	
Mendocino; MEN R0.10-T106.80		30.43	555A	Calpella (Moore Street, Central Avenue)	
Mendocino; MEN R0.10-T106.80		30.83	555B	SR 20 east – Upper Lake, Williams	Southern end of SR 20 overlap
Mendocino; MEN R0.10-T106.80		R32.63	557	West Road – Redwood Valley	
Mendocino; MEN R0.10-T106.80			Northern end of freeway		
Mendocino; MEN R0.10-T106.80		41.06	Ridgewood Summit, elevation 1,956 feet (596 m)		
Mendocino; MEN R0.10-T106.80		41.20	Ridgewood Weigh Station (southbound only)		
Mendocino; MEN R0.10-T106.80			Southern end of freeway		
Mendocino; MEN R0.10-T106.80			568	SR 20 west – Willits, Fort Bragg	Northern end of SR 20 overlap; former US 101 north
Mendocino; MEN R0.10-T106.80			573	North Main Street	Former US 101 south
Mendocino; MEN R0.10-T106.80			Northern end of freeway		
Mendocino; MEN R0.10-T106.80		58.90	Moss Cove Rest Area (southbound only)		
Mendocino; MEN R0.10-T106.80	Longvale	59.31		SR 162 east – Covelo, Round Valley	
Mendocino; MEN R0.10-T106.80		61.82		Irvine Lodge Road – Irvine Lodge Rest Area	No left turn from US 101 south
Mendocino; MEN R0.10-T106.80		82.50	Empire Camp Rest Area (northbound only)		
Mendocino; MEN R0.10-T106.80			Southern end of freeway		
Mendocino; MEN R0.10-T106.80		R84.69	609	SR 271 north	Former US 101 north
Mendocino; MEN R0.10-T106.80	South Leggett	R89.57	614	South Leggett (SR 271)	Former US 101
Mendocino; MEN R0.10-T106.80			Northern end of freeway		
Mendocino; MEN R0.10-T106.80	Leggett	T91.25		SR 1 south – Leggett, Fort Bragg	Former SR 208 south
Mendocino; MEN R0.10-T106.80	South Fork Eel River	R99.51– R100.02	Confusion Hill Bridges		
Mendocino; MEN R0.10-T106.80			Southern end of freeway		
Mendocino; MEN R0.10-T106.80	Reynolds	R101.89	625	SR 271	Former US 101
Mendocino; MEN R0.10-T106.80	Piercy	R103.81	627	Piercy (SR 271)	Former US 101
Humboldt; HUM T0.00-R137.44			Northern end of freeway		
Humboldt; HUM T0.00-R137.44	Cooks Valley	T0.08		SR 271 south – Piercy, Cooks Valley	Former US 101 south
Humboldt; HUM T0.00-R137.44			Southern end of freeway		
Humboldt; HUM T0.00-R137.44	Benbow	R8.60	636	Benbow (Lake Benbow Drive)	
Humboldt; HUM T0.00-R137.44	Garberville	R11.13	639A	Sprowel Creek Road (US 101 Bus. north) – Garberville	No northbound entrance
Humboldt; HUM T0.00-R137.44	Garberville	R11.50	639B	Garberville, Redway (Redwood Drive)	No southbound entrance
Humboldt; HUM T0.00-R137.44		R14.31	642	Redwood Drive (US 101 Bus. south) – Redway	
Humboldt; HUM T0.00-R137.44		R17.91	645	Avenue of the Giants (SR 254), Hooker Creek Road – Phillipsville	Hooker Creek Road not signed northbound; Avenue of the Giants not signed southbound
Humboldt; HUM T0.00-R137.44		R22.44	650	Miranda, Phillipsville (Maple Hills Road)	
Humboldt; HUM T0.00-R137.44		25.01	653	Salmon Creek Road	
Humboldt; HUM T0.00-R137.44	Myers Flat	27.94	656	Myers Flat (SR 254)	
Humboldt; HUM T0.00-R137.44		33.22	661	Weott (Newton Road)	
Humboldt; HUM T0.00-R137.44		35.70	663	South Fork, Honeydew (SR 254)	
Humboldt; HUM T0.00-R137.44		39.16	667A	Avenue of the Giants (SR 254)	Southbound exit only
Humboldt; HUM T0.00-R137.44		R39.67	667	Redcrest, Holmes (Sorenson Road)	
Humboldt; HUM T0.00-R137.44		R43.32	671	Pepperwood, Redcrest, Holmes (Barkdull Road)	
Humboldt; HUM T0.00-R137.44		R45.90	674	Avenue of the Giants (SR 254), Jordan Road – Pepperwood	Avenue of the Giants not signed northbound; Jordan Road not signed southbound
Humboldt; HUM T0.00-R137.44		R47.95	676	Stafford Road	
Humboldt; HUM T0.00-R137.44			Northern end of freeway		
Humboldt; HUM T0.00-R137.44			Southern end of freeway		
Humboldt; HUM T0.00-R137.44		R51.84	679	Rio Dell, Scotia (SR 283, US 101 Bus. north)	
Humboldt; HUM T0.00-R137.44	Rio Dell	R52.60	680	Davis Street	
Humboldt; HUM T0.00-R137.44	Rio Dell	R53.38	681	Wildwood Avenue (US 101 Bus. south) – Rio Dell	
Humboldt; HUM T0.00-R137.44			Northern end of freeway		
Humboldt; HUM T0.00-R137.44			Southern end of freeway		
Humboldt; HUM T0.00-R137.44	Fortuna	57.69	685	SR 36 east – Hydesville, Bridgeville	Roger Rodoni Memorial Interchange
Humboldt; HUM T0.00-R137.44	Fortuna	59.50	687	Kenmar Road (US 101 Bus. north), Riverwalk Drive	Riverwalk Drive not signed southbound
Humboldt; HUM T0.00-R137.44	Fortuna	60.49	688	12th Street	
Humboldt; HUM T0.00-R137.44	Fortuna	61.53	689	Main Street (US 101 Bus. south)	
Humboldt; HUM T0.00-R137.44	Fortuna	62.23	690	Palmer Boulevard	
Humboldt; HUM T0.00-R137.44	Fernbridge	63.10	691	Fernbridge, Ferndale (Fernbrige Drive to SR 211)	Northbound exit and southbound entrance
Humboldt; HUM T0.00-R137.44	Fernbridge	64.30	692	Loleta, Fernbridge, Ferndale (SR 211)	
Humboldt; HUM T0.00-R137.44		65.95	694	Loleta Drive	
Humboldt; HUM T0.00-R137.44		68.21	696	Hookton Road – Loleta	
Humboldt; HUM T0.00-R137.44	Humboldt Hill	70.61	698	College of the Redwoods (Tompkins Hill Road)	
Humboldt; HUM T0.00-R137.44	Humboldt Hill	72.03	699	Fields Landing (Orchard Avenue, Fields Landing Drive)	
Humboldt; HUM T0.00-R137.44	Humboldt Hill	72.88	700	King Salmon Avenue	
Humboldt; HUM T0.00-R137.44	Humboldt Hill	73.72	701	Humboldt Hill Road – Humboldt Hill	
Humboldt; HUM T0.00-R137.44	Eureka	74.77	702	Herrick Avenue, Elk River Road	
Humboldt; HUM T0.00-R137.44	Eureka		Northern end of freeway		
Humboldt; HUM T0.00-R137.44	Eureka	79.17		SR 255 north (R Street) / Myrtle Avenue – Samoa	
Humboldt; HUM T0.00-R137.44	Arcata		Southern end of freeway		
Humboldt; HUM T0.00-R137.44	Arcata	85.03	712	South G Street	Southbound exit and entrance
Humboldt; HUM T0.00-R137.44	Arcata	85.83	713	SR 255 south (Samoa Boulevard) – Arcata, Samoa, Sunny Brae	
Humboldt; HUM T0.00-R137.44	Arcata	86.50	714A	14th Street – Humboldt State University	Northbound exit and southbound entrance
Humboldt; HUM T0.00-R137.44	Arcata	86.94	714B	Sunset Avenue – Arcata, Humboldt State University	Signed as exit 714 southbound
Humboldt; HUM T0.00-R137.44	Arcata	88.27	716A	SR 299 east – Weaverville, Redding	Former US 299
Humboldt; HUM T0.00-R137.44	Arcata	88.80	716B	Giuntoli Lane, Janes Road	
Humboldt; HUM T0.00-R137.44	McKinleyville	R90.13	718	SR 200 east (North Bank Road) / Central Avenue (US 101 Bus. north) – McKinleyville	Central Avenue not signed southbound
Humboldt; HUM T0.00-R137.44	McKinleyville	R91.47	719	School Road	
Humboldt; HUM T0.00-R137.44	McKinleyville	R93.00	721	Murray Road	
Humboldt; HUM T0.00-R137.44	McKinleyville	R93.85	722	Arcata–Eureka Airport (Airport Road)	
Humboldt; HUM T0.00-R137.44	McKinleyville	R95.62	723	North Central Avenue (US 101 Bus. south) – McKinleyville	
Humboldt; HUM T0.00-R137.44	McKinleyville	R97.02	725	Crannell Road	
Humboldt; HUM T0.00-R137.44		98.07	726A	Westhaven Drive	Northbound exit and southbound entrance
Humboldt; HUM T0.00-R137.44		98.36	726B	6th Avenue – Westhaven	Signed as exit 726 southbound
Humboldt; HUM T0.00-R137.44	Trinidad	100.71	728	Trinidad (North Westhaven Drive, Main Street)	
Humboldt; HUM T0.00-R137.44		R102.90	Southbound Trinidad Rest Area		
Humboldt; HUM T0.00-R137.44		R103.37	731	Seawood Drive	
Humboldt; HUM T0.00-R137.44		R105.20	Northbound Trinidad Rest Area		
Humboldt; HUM T0.00-R137.44		R106.06	734	Patricks Point Drive	
Humboldt; HUM T0.00-R137.44			Northern end of freeway		
Humboldt; HUM T0.00-R137.44			Southern end of freeway		
Humboldt; HUM T0.00-R137.44		R126.09	753	Newton B. Drury Scenic Parkway north	Former US 101 north
Del Norte; DN M0.00-46.49		R0.15	765	Newton B. Drury Scenic Parkway south	Former US 101 south
Del Norte; DN M0.00-46.49		R3.56	768	Klamath Beach Road (CR D8)	
Del Norte; DN M0.00-46.49	Klamath	R4.64	769	SR 169 east – Klamath, Terwer Valley	
Del Norte; DN M0.00-46.49	Klamath		Northern end of freeway		
Del Norte; DN M0.00-46.49	Klamath			Requa Road (CR D7) / Minot Creek Road	
Del Norte; DN M0.00-46.49	Crescent City	25.84		Elk Valley Road (CR D2) – Elk Valley Rancheria	
Del Norte; DN M0.00-46.49	Crescent City	27.01		CR D3 (Northcrest Drive)	
Del Norte; DN M0.00-46.49				Parkway Drive to Washington Boulevard	Northbound exit and entrance; interchange
Del Norte; DN M0.00-46.49			Southern end of freeway		
Del Norte; DN M0.00-46.49		R27.87	791	Washington Boulevard (CR D1)	No northbound exit
Del Norte; DN M0.00-46.49		R30.81	794	US 199 north (Redwood Highway north) to I-5 – Grants Pass	Northbound exit and southbound entrance; US 101 south transitions onto Redwood Highway south
Del Norte; DN M0.00-46.49			Northern end of freeway		
Del Norte; DN M0.00-46.49				Elk Valley Cross Road (CR D2) to US 199 – Grants Pass	
Del Norte; DN M0.00-46.49				Lake Earl Drive (CR D3) – Pelican Bay State Prison	
Del Norte; DN M0.00-46.49		36.26		SR 197 south (North Bank Road)	
Del Norte; DN M0.00-46.49				Fred D. Haight Drive (CR D4)	
Del Norte; DN M0.00-46.49	Smith River	39.83		Fred D. Haight Drive (CR D4) – Smith River	
Del Norte; DN M0.00-46.49				Sarina Road, Ocean View Drive (CR D5)	
Del Norte; DN M0.00-46.49	Smith River Rancheria			Mouth Smith River Road (CR D6)	
Del Norte; DN M0.00-46.49				Ocean View Drive (CR D5)	
Del Norte; DN M0.00-46.49		46.20	Agricultural Inspection Station (southbound only)		
Del Norte; DN M0.00-46.49		46.49		US 101 north – Oregon Coast, Portland	Continuation into Oregon
1.000 mi = 1.609 km; 1.000 km = 0.621 mi: Closed/former; Concurrency terminus; Electronic toll collection; HOV only; Incomplete access; Route transition; Unopened

== Notes ==
U.S. Route 101
Previous state: Terminus	California	Next state: Oregon
