= Warren Church (politician) =

American politician

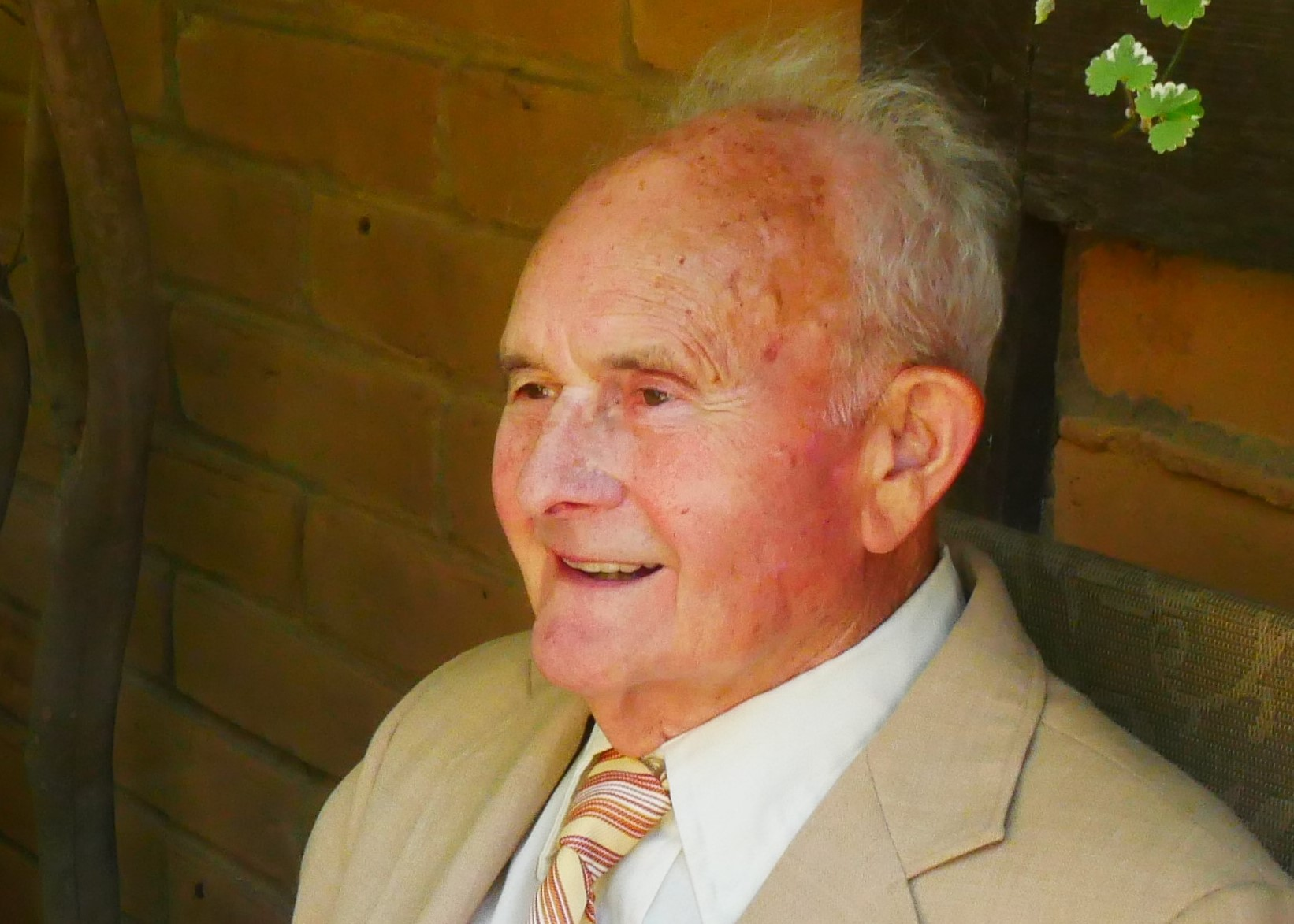

Monterey County Board of Supervisors District 1
- In office 1965–1977
- Preceded by: Chester Deaver
- Succeeded by: Kenneth Blohm

Personal details
- Born: Levi Warren Church; October 19, 1929 Elkhorn, California, U.S.
- Died: September 2, 2017 (aged 87) Monterey County, California, U.S.
- Party: Democratic
- Education: Cal Poly San Luis Obispo (MA)
- Occupation: Business owner

Warren Church (October 19, 1929 – September 2, 2017) was an American politician and educator who served on the Monterey County Board of Supervisors from 1965 to 1977. He was a Democrat who represented District 1 which at that time encompassed the northern parts of Monterey County. He served on various committees and published books on local history and genealogy. He was a native of Monterey County.

Warren Church has been acknowledged as the father of the Monterey County parks system.

== Early life, education, and career ==
Warren Church was born in northern Monterey County and spent all his life in the county, graduating from King City High School in 1947. He was a high school athlete as well as being active with both student government and the school newspaper. At the age of 15, Church worked in the stock room of the King City J.C. Penney department store. He graduated from California Polytechnic State College in 1962, earning a bachelor's degree in social sciences and a Master of Arts Degree in education-social sciences. He also received both elementary and secondary teaching credentials. He was also on the staff of the college newspaper, "El Mustang." In 1974, Church was awarded the Honored Alumni Award by Cal Poly University's alumni association.

Church served in the Korean War and served with the 987th Armored Field Artillery Battalion and was wounded while serving, receiving a Purple Heart. He was eventually discharged as a Corporal on April 17, 1953.

Church taught at the Pajaro Elementary and the Jefferson school in San Benito.

== Board of Supervisors ==
Before the 1964 Monterey County Board of Supervisors primary, Church, Allmond and incumbent Chester Deaver were split over their positions on the incorporation of North Monterey County, Castroville and Moss Landing. Church opposed the incorporation of North Monterey County, calling it an "'extremely poor, short sighted and senseless reason,'" but felt that Castroville was ready. Allmond called the incorporation of Castroville a "'stab in the back'" but later changed to asking for more input from the Castroville people. Deaver wanted to take a "'wait and see' attitude."

In the June 1964 primary, Chester Deaver had finished far in front of his challengers; Deaver 2,927, Church 1,374, Allmond 1,116, Simon 938, Bayer 650, Coffill 391 (unofficial results). However, the runoff of the top two candidates led to the election of Church to the Monterey County Board of Supervisors November 3, 1964. Church defeated incumbent Deaver, "with a 1,066 vote margin". At the time, The supervisor position was part-time and came with a typewriter and $300 a month for incidentals.

The 1968 election results were Church 5,555 to Simon 2,859.

In 1972, the Salinas Californian endorsed Church for Supervisor, while saying that they have disagreed with him many times and probably will continue to do so as "the interests of the city of Salinas seen to be a fairly low priority item with him... Nevertheless,... he is head and shoulders above his opponents." Church won reelection for his third term June 6, 1972. He won with 53% of the vote. His challengers were Jack Simon and Andrew Hollenstain.

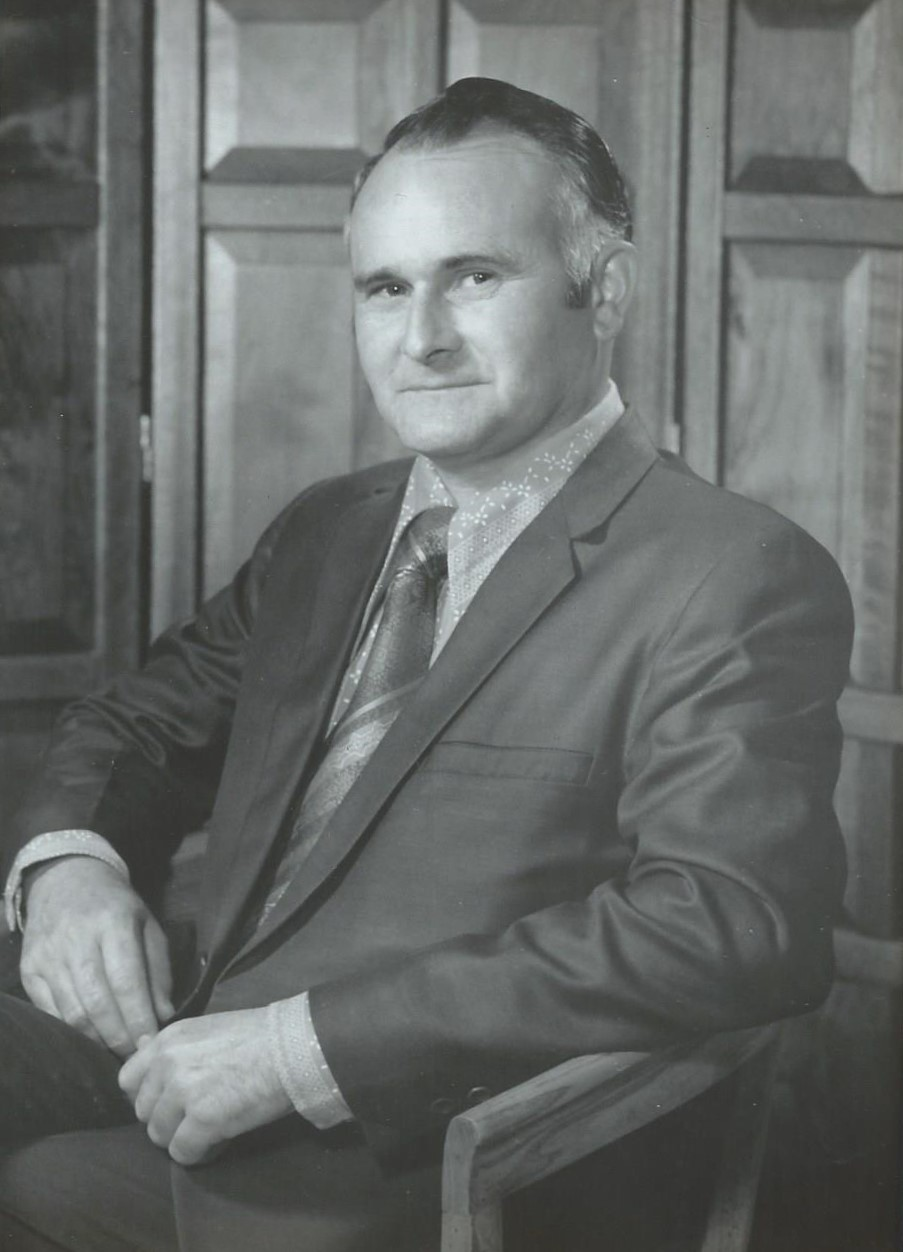
Warren Church

In 1972 Church was invited to a Salinas Board of Realtors meeting to discuss campaign issues in a private setting. Church declined stating:

I do not represent special interest groups and therefore cannot participate in these private affairs where the press is specifically prohibited. The public has a right to know what questions are asked and how each candidate answers them… This is what is wrong with American politics today – special interests want to exert back room influence on candidates without the public knowing what is going on.

In November 1972, the Board heard arguments for relaxing zoning ordinances for mobile homes in North Monterey County. Arguments for relaxing were due to very high home prices that made owning a home in the county difficult. Arguments against were that mobile homeowners used the county services equally as a homeowner but paid lower taxes. There was also a concern about a reduction of lot sizes, allowing the county to double in population since 1963 when 11,000 residents lived in the unincorporated area of North County (excluding Castroville). According to the North County Rezoning Study which looked at 48,700 acres and an existing density of 11.3 acres per unit, proposed developments could increase the population from 16,000 (from 1970 census) to 338,900 with a density of .51 acres per unit. Appearance of mobile homes, fire safety, and environmental concerns were also a consideration. Church stated that all attendees at the meeting that approved of the ban lived in North Monterey County, and those arguing about the ban were people who lived outside the area and had a financial interest. One Pacific Grove resident, Art Woodfin, complained about the ban stating that he "had an option on 15 acres of land in North County and planned to put mobile homes on it." Church replied, "'Then you're coming to rape the North County?'"

The Salinas Californian stated in 1975 that although the Californian has criticized Church, "he's given us about as good as he's got in rebuttal... its hard not to admire the man's independence." There was a serious recall effort for Church's seat in 1974 which failed. Despite losing several elections, "Defeat doesn't discourage him... Church doesn't scare worth a darn." In August 1975, Church announced that he would not seek re-election to the Board of Supervisors saying, "'12 years is as long as anyone should consecutively hold any one elective or appointive position... New ideas are necessary for proper functioning of government.'" He hinted that he might run for the State Senate seat that was being vacated by Republican Donald Grunsky.

Church had a perfect meeting attendance record. In the 12 years of Church's tenure, he did not miss a single board meeting. Church remembers at his farewell Supervisor meeting that he "attended 558 consecutive regular board meetings and 100 or more special meetings." Reflecting on needs of the county for his successor, Church said that "growth and property taxes... the two major problems facing Monterey County... prohibit general use of the property tax and adopt low density zoning... we don't have to become South San Jose." Further about his tenure with the Board, Church reflected, "I see no basis to bring suit against the county, except perhaps for the amount and color of my hair." County Supervisor and future Congressman Sam Farr in 1976, said of his colleague Church, "'I think this board has really been one of the outstanding supervisorial boards in California ... whose 12 years of experience and insight have taught me a lot. I think that serving in public office is really a leveling experience. I think I've learned that from my colleague on the left (Poyner) and Mr. Church.'"

=== Parks ===
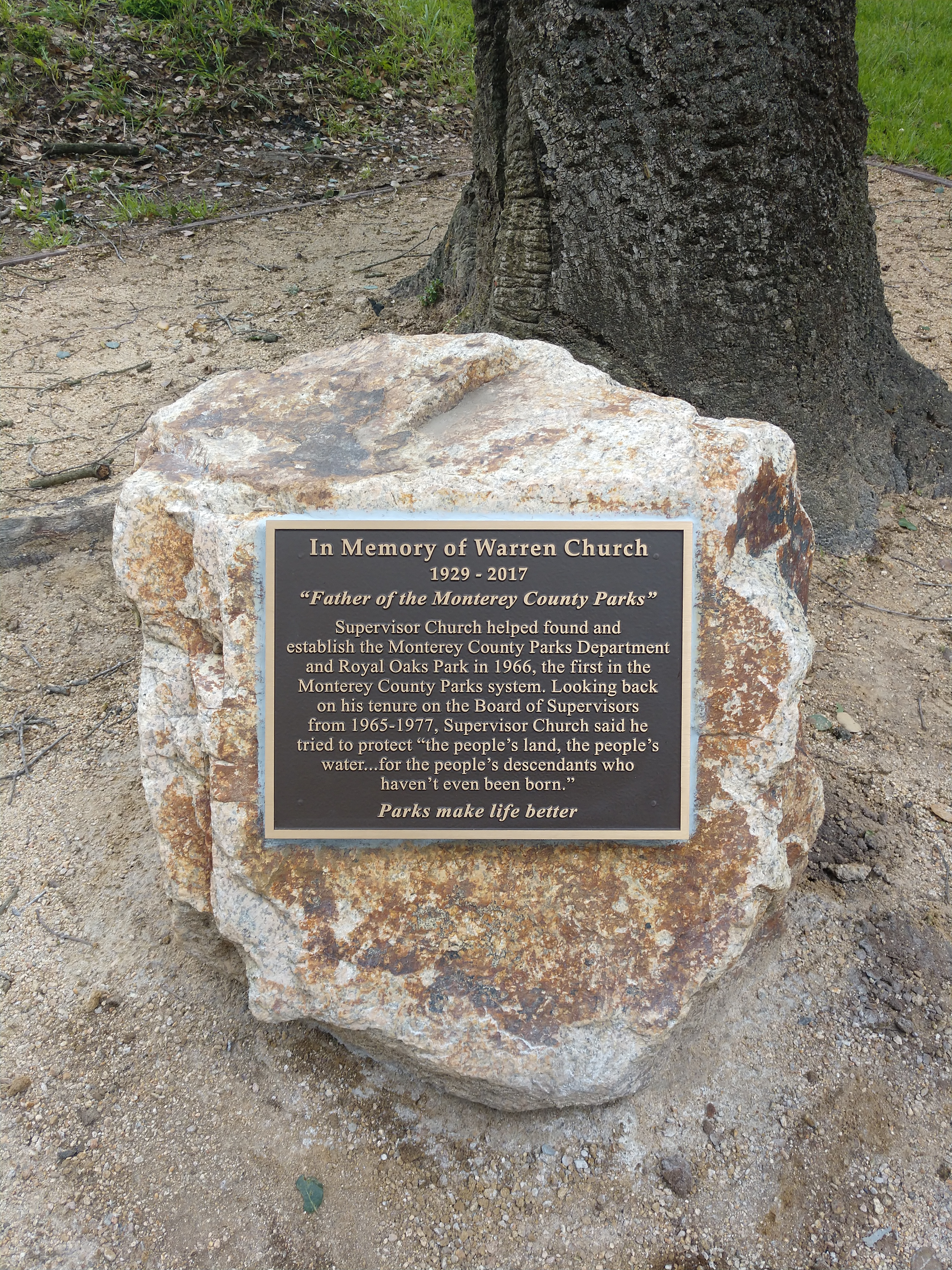
A plaque honoring Church for his efforts in starting the county park system and preserving the native environment and resources.

Church was instrumental in the acquisition and development of the Monterey County Parks system. When running for the board position in 1964 his "main plank was a county park system." Prior to 1966, Monterey County did not have a parks department, and was one of the last counties in California to have one. There had been interest in 1944 when the county made a parks plan, but nothing happened. Church blames a '"conservative viewpoint that didn't push for public services.'" for the reason it took until 1966 to give Monterey County its first public park, Royal Oaks Park. He spearheaded the purchase of a former turkey ranch, for Royal Oaks Park ($122,000 – it was $1,000 an acre), which opened on Labor Day in 1966 and also saw establishment of the Monterey County Parks Department that same year. His tenure on the Board of Supervisors also saw the creation of a number of other parks including Manzanita Park near Castroville, Toro Park in Salinas, Jacks Peak in Monterey and San Lorenzo Park near King City.

At the 25th anniversary of the founding of the Monterey County Parks Department, Republican Charmaine Cruchett thanked Church and said, "The little fox I recently saw dashing across Castroville Boulevard into Manzanita Park may not know who provided that haven, but certainly all North Countians should. I thank you Warren. My children thank you. And if we're lucky, our human progeny can share your parks progeny forever." The county administrative office released a memorandum October 2, 2006, at the 40th anniversary of the Parks Department saying, "The highlight of the event was the attendance of Warren Church... who was instrumental in establishing the Parks Department and Charter Park Commissioners, from 1966." In 1977 Church said he had tried to protect

... the people's land, the people's water... for the people's descendants who haven't even been born.

=== Civic interests ===
In 1975 Church pointed out that there is a relationship between growth and property taxes leading to agricultural land being sold for development. This drives the need for services and thus higher taxes. One outcome was the passage in 1976 of a Board of Supervisors resolution to establish "growth guidelines to protect the character of the county." Church felt that rather than using property taxes to support county governments, a percentage of federal or state income tax could be set aside.

Church was a strong supporter of local control and access to the court system and he long resisted the eventual consolidation of Monterey County courts, largely in service to the interests of his constituents.

At the end of his tenure, the Californian stated that Church was a strong supporter of the library system and initiated the first family planning program in Monterey County.

Church was also a founder of Post 593 of the Prunedale American Legion.

=== Humble Oil ===
Church was a key vote on a controversial 1965 project promoted by Humble Oil, a subsidiary of Standard Oil of New Jersey, that would have changed the Monterey Bay's look and feel. Humble was intended to kickstart a massive 60-square-mile development plan for the Moss Landing area that would have significantly impacted the area's natural beauty and altered its economic development. The company wanted to build a 50,000-barrel-a-day refinery with plans to expand to 150,000–200,000 barrels a day on a 444-acre site on the wetlands near Moss Landing at the Elkhorn Slough. Monterey County was deeply divided on the plan with tourism proponents, some agricultural interests and a nascent environmental movement opposing the refinery. However, public opinion surveys showed greater than 2-to-1 support for the Humble Oil refinery with Church's supervisorial district in favor with 82%. The Board of Supervisors, after a 17-hour marathon public meeting, voted 3–2 to back the plan, with Church in favor of it because his district overwhelmingly backed the plan. But Church and others added many tough restrictions to the project a few weeks later at a 12-hour meeting that set the conditions for the permit. "It is not just the Humble Oil refinery we are fighting at Moss Landing," said Carmel Highlands photographer Ansel Adams prior to the decision. "It is the whole industrial complex which will inevitability follow and change the whole complexion of this Monterey County."

The Humble project was approved, but the planning commission (which had previously rejected the project by a 5–4 vote) had imposed 36 conditions many that had never been imposed on an industry before. Church added three more which included for parking, sulfur recovery and carbon monoxide emissions. As a part of the imposed conditions on the approval for Humble Oil, Church asked that three air-pollution stations be set up in Monterey County to monitor air quality for two-years prior to Humble starting to build. Church said that the county needed to do so in order to "obtain 'guidelines' to determine what pollutants an oil refinery may contribute." Church's intentions were that Humble be required to pay for and maintain the stations. The Salinas Californian stated, "It is conceivable in the future that other areas debating the admittance of an oil refinery will look at Monterey County as an example of strict regulations. The conditions are that unique." One of the most restrictive conditions forbid Humble Oil from expanding significantly without getting a new permit.

By the spring of 1966, Humble Oil was expressing the need for a larger refinery than initially permitted. Church publicly declared that there was not a majority on the Board of Supervisors for a larger refinery. Although not identifying himself as the supervisor switching his position on Humble, it is widely accepted that it was Church who refused to back a larger refinery unless Humble could "prove" that a smaller one would comply with the county's restrictions. On May 18, 1966, Humble Oil announced a suspension of all activities at Moss Landing, publicly stating that a prime reason for abandoning the site was the difficulty of achieving a permit for a larger refinery. Public outcry and a legal challenge plus engineering problems also discouraged Humble Oil, and they eventually pulled out of Monterey County and decided to build a bigger refinery up north in more-welcoming Benicia.

In 1979, Church would become a founding member of the Elkhorn Slough Foundation, which eventually helped create the Elkhorn Slough National Estuarine Research Reserve, which would have been devastated by Humble Oil's refinery and future industrial development. After Humble Oil's departure, no major industry seriously proposed to build at Moss Landing. In 1992, the Monterey Bay National Marine Sanctuary was established.

== Committees ==
Church served on several civic and government boards, including:

- California Central Coast Regional Water Control Board
- Vice President Monterey County Board of Education – Served April 16, 1963, to November 12, 1964
- Monterey-Santa Cruz County Unified Air Pollution Control District – District Board of Directors from 1968 to 1975.
- San Felipe Committee (California Central Coast Water Importation)
- Special Tax Committees of the County Supervisors Association of California
- Local Applications Advisory Board, created in 1965 to "approve applications for migrant housing, education and health care". Church was succeeded by John Ventura, Fresno County Supervisor in 1967.

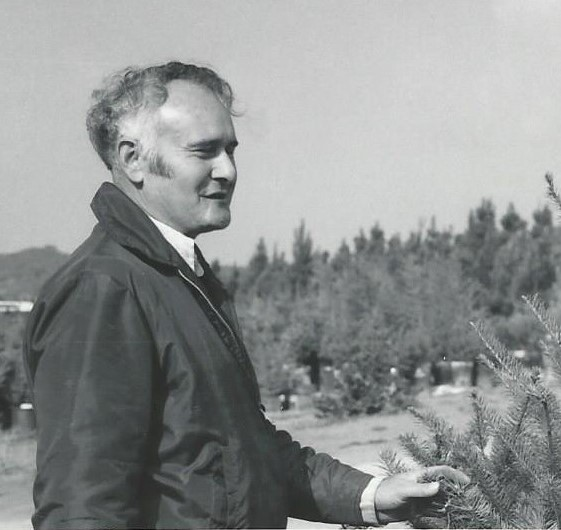
Warren Church – 1980

== Personal life ==
Church had a number of business ventures, including beekeeping in high school and college, nursery supply and Christmas Tree farms. He has grown Christmas trees in properties in Hidden Valley, at Omo Ranch, CA., Egremont, Ma., and Wadena, Mn.

== Death ==
Church died September 2, 2017, at age 87. Suffering from a fatal disease and surrounded by close friends and family, he proactively took his own life using Seconal in accordance with the 2016 California End of Life Option Act. The Californian September 2, 2017, article, quotes Church's son Glenn Church on the manner of his father's death, "He had no hesitation. He took the (fatal) prescription with conviction and certainty." Church's cause of death was recorded as cachexia (the syndrome he had) in accordance of the End of Life Option Act.

== Publications ==
- Church, Warren (1970). The Overburdened Ark: A Resource Essay on the Problems of Population Growth.
- Church, Warren (1984). American Ancestry of L. Warren Church.
- Church, Warren (2002). American Ancestry of Clinton M. King Descendant of John King of Northampton.
- Church, Warren (2004). Historical Notes of North Monterey County: With a History of Hidden Valley.
- Church, Warren (2006). The American Ancestry of Sarah Elizabeth Raymond Church.

== See also ==
- California End of Life Option Act
- Medical aid in dying in the United States
