= North Monterey County Unified School District =

School district in California

Address
- 8142 Moss Landing Road Moss Landing, California, 95039; United States

District information
- Type: Public
- Grades: K–12
- NCES District ID: 0627590

Students and staff
- Students: 4,583 (2020–2021)
- Teachers: 203.69 (FTE)
- Staff: 268.79 (FTE)
- Student–teacher ratio: 22.5:1

Other information
- Website: www.nmcusd.org

North Monterey County Unified School Districtor NMCUSD is a school district in northern Monterey County. The school district serves 5581 pupils in the communities of Aromas, Castroville, Elkhorn, Prunedale, Royal Oaks, Moss Landing, and portions of Salinas, California. The district's average spending per pupil is $4,402 and the average teacher salary is $37,108 . NMCUSD students are 66% Hispanic or Latino, 29% White, 2% Filipino, 1% Asian, and 1% African American . The API scores of secondary schools are average in the statewide context and above average in the context of similar schools while the elementary schools are below average . The current Superintendent is Dr.Matthew Turkie, he has been the superintendent since March 2024.

== District Governance ==
NMCUSD is governed by a 5 member Board of Trustees. Each member is elected to serve a 4-year term. The Board elects among its own members a President, Vice-President, Clerk, and a Parliamentarian. The Board of Trustees is responsible for making all decisions concerning the allocation of district funds with the advice of the district's administration, teachers, staff, and community members and within the limits, laws, and guidelines of state of California and the United States.

== Measure E and Recent Controversy ==
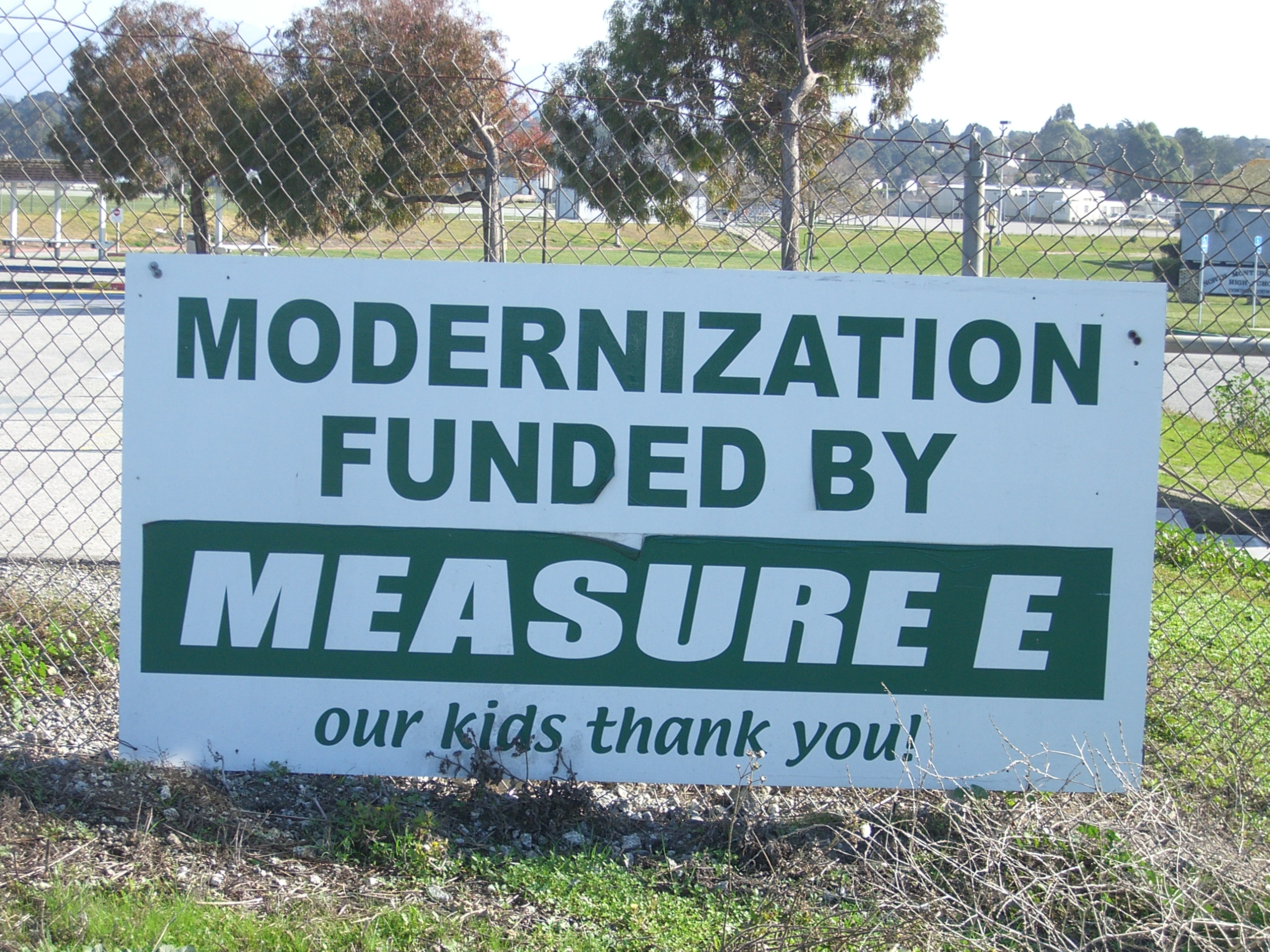
Measure E sign in front of high school.

Measure E passed in November 2002 with 68.3% of the vote. The bond measure provided $20,750,000 for repairs and refurbishing of district schools and funds for the construction of a new middle school. The bond measure replaced an expiring bond used to construct North Monterey County High School thus caused only minimal increases in property taxes. The district ordered the modular classrooms and had begun leveling and altering the terrain to build a new middle school when the district learned that the site was too close to the high voltage power lines. The district had no new middle school and less than $900,000 in available funds. NMCUSD recently decided to expand its current middle school site, the converted former Joseph Gambetta Middle School, by adding the portables the district had already purchased.

Parents have voiced their discontent at school board meetings and asked questions concerning the spending of Measure E funds. The engineering firm Modtech filed a lawsuit against NMCUSD for $69,000 on March 29, 2007 The teachers went on a “sick out” strike in late March to lobby for higher wages before a deal was agreed to in April. The district also faces budgetary problems due to the short term California wide decline in student enrollment.

Site where the new middle school was to be built.

== Schools ==
- Castroville Elementary School
- Echo Valley Elementary
- Elkhorn Elementary School
- Prunedale Elementary School
- North Monterey County Middle School (formerly Joseph Gambetta Middle School)
- North Monterey County High School
