= North Monterey County High School =

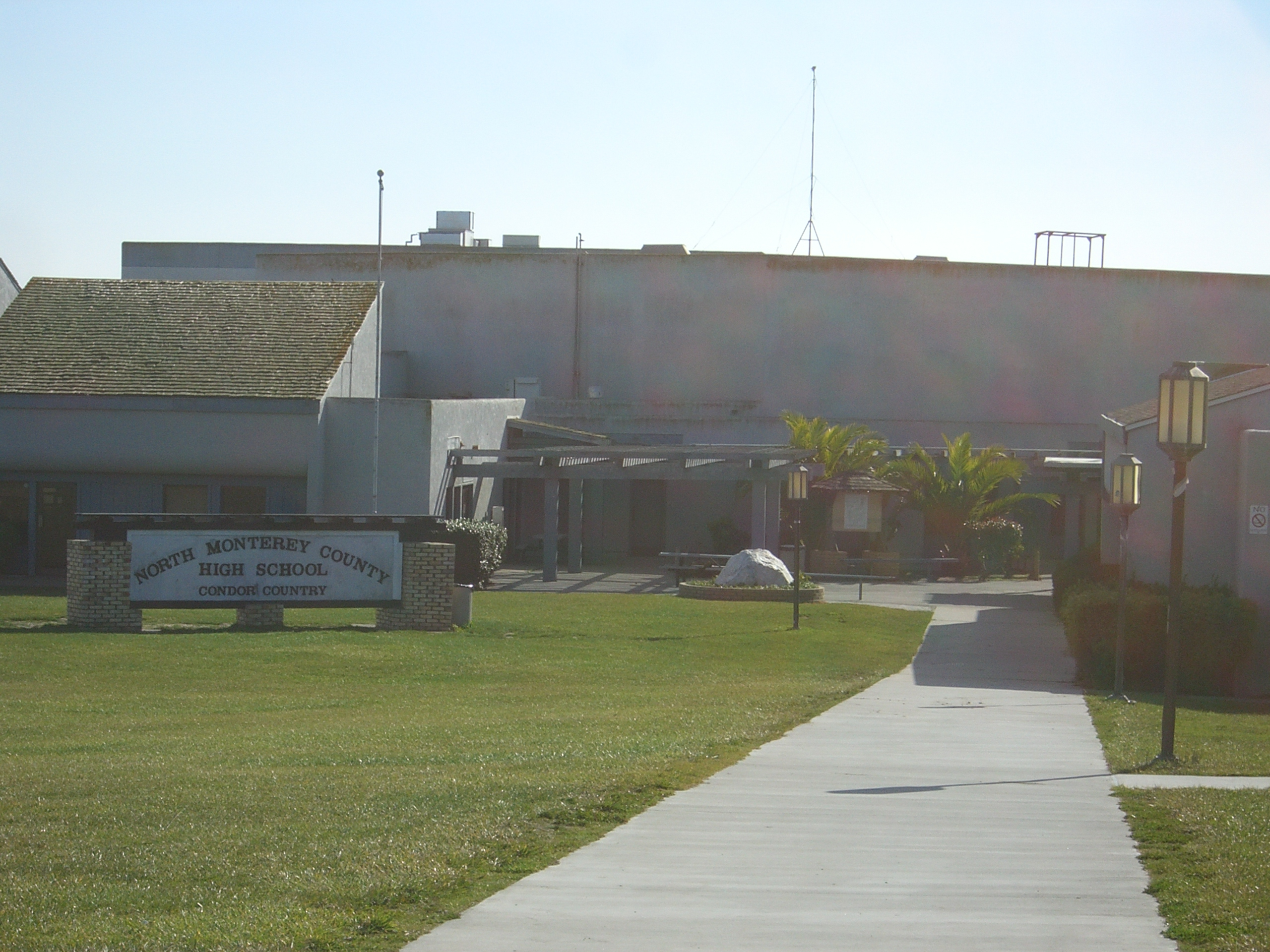
- NMCHS main entrance.

Location
- 13990 Castroville Blvd; Castroville CA 95012; United States; 36.77812°N 121.7343°W

Information
- Type: Public 4-year
- Established: 1978
- School district: North Monterey County Unified School District
- Principal: Chandlee Wood
- Teaching staff: 64.35 (FTE)
- Enrollment: 1,284 (2023–2024)
- Student to teacher ratio: 19.95
- Colors: Silver, black.
- Athletics conference: Coast Conference, Central Coast Section
- Mascot: Condor
- Rival: Watsonville High School
- Website: nmchs.nmcusd.org

North Monterey County High School is a high school in Castroville, California, USA, was established in 1978. It serves the populations of Aromas, Castroville, Prunedale, Royal Oaks, Elkhorn and Salinas. The school is part of the North Monterey County Unified School District. North Monterey County High School is abbreviated on some official documents as NMCHS although it is more commonly known as either "North County" or "NC".

== Students ==
The school serves just under 1,500 students. 56% are Hispanic or Latino, 36% are White, 2% are African American and 3% are Asian. About one-fifth of North County students are designated as English Language Learners.

== Background ==
Before 1978, North Monterey County students traveled to Salinas for high school. Many local residents wanted to have their own high school so that their children would not have to travel. In 1978, voters approved a bond measure to build the high school under the campaign slogan "Yes is Best". In fall 1978, North County opened to a new student body that did not include a senior class. In June 1980, the first class graduated. In 1985, the high school won national recognition from President Reagan as one of the best 100 high schools in the cUS and subsequently won two distinguished California High School Awards in the 1990s. The school has been recognized at the California Conference of Superintendents for its high Latino graduation rate.

== Activities ==
=== Marching band ===
The NMCHS marching band, directed by Barry Capiaux, has received attention for performances in China, Italy and Hawaii, and participation in President Clinton's second inaugural parade. Likewise, the wind ensemble, symphonic and jazz bands have performed at these localations as well as competitions in Canada, Colorado Springs and the Monterey Jazz Festival.

=== Sports ===
- American football
- Baseball
- Softball
- Soccer
- Track and field
- Golf
- Wrestling
- Boys' basketball
- Girls' basketball
- Cross country
- Volleyball

=== Non-sport activities ===
- Cheerleading
- Color Guard

== Notable alumni ==
- Jamie Iredell — writer
