= Elkhorn, California =

- Census-designated place
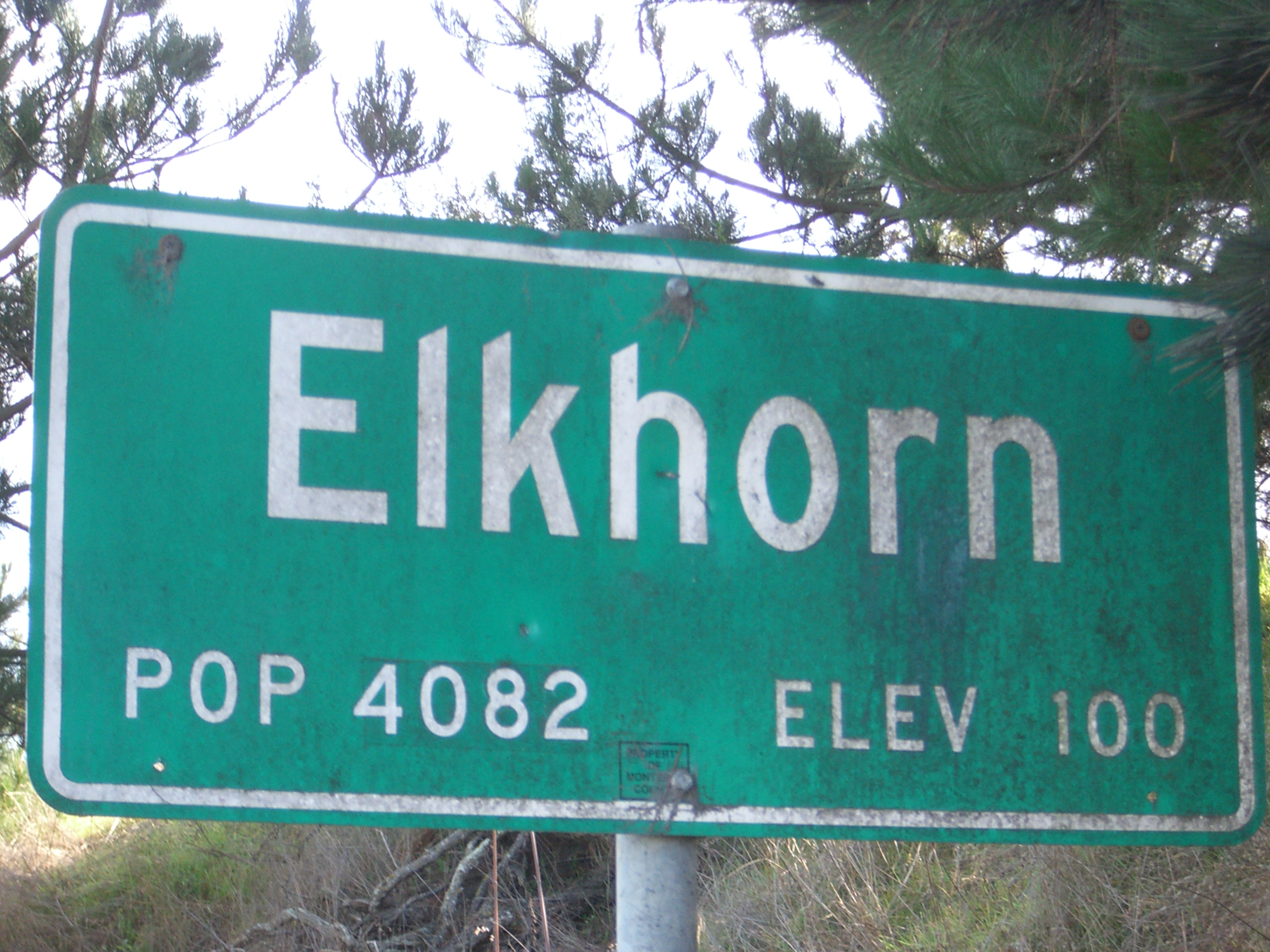
- Population sign on Dolan Road

- Location in Monterey County and the state of California

- Location in the United States
- Coordinates: 36°49′28″N 121°44′26″W
- Country: United States
- State: California
- County: Monterey

Government
  - State Senator: John Laird (D)
  - Assemblymember: Robert Rivas (D)
  - U. S. Rep.: Jimmy Panetta (D)

Area
  - Total: 4.825 sq mi (12.50 km^{2})
  - Land: 4.803 sq mi (12.44 km^{2})
  - Water: 0.022 sq mi (0.057 km^{2}) 0.46%
- Elevation: 9.8 ft (3 m)

Population (2020)
  - Total: 1,588
  - Density: 330.6/sq mi (127.6/km^{2})
- Time zone: UTC-8 (PST)
  - Summer (DST): UTC-7 (PDT)
- ZIP codes: 95012 (Castroville); 93907 (Prunedale)
- Area code: 831
- FIPS code: 06-22034
- GNIS feature ID: 277507, 2408075

Elkhorn is an unincorporated community and census-designated place (CDP) in Monterey County, California, United States.

Elkhorn was originally a stop on the Southern Pacific Railroad, 4 miles (6 km) north of Castroville, at an elevation of 10 feet (3.0 m). The settled part of the community now occupies the hills to the east of the railroad. The population of the Elkhorn CDP was 1,588 at the 2020 census. Local understandings of the extent of Elkhorn may vary from the Census definition.

Elkhorn was named after the elk in the area that have since gone extinct.

== Geography ==
Elkhorn is in northern Monterey County, 14 miles (23 km) northwest of Salinas, the county seat; 7 miles (11 km) south of Watsonville; and 22 miles (35 km) northeast of Monterey. The community receives mail within the ZIP Code areas of 95012 (Castroville) and 93907 (Prunedale / Salinas). Elkhorn Slough, the largest tidal salt marsh in the area outside of San Francisco Bay, borders the northwest side of the community. The Elkhorn Slough National Estuarine Research Reserve promotes education about and preservation of the salt marsh environs.

According to the United States Census Bureau, the Elkhorn CDP has a total area of 4.8 square miles (12 km^{2}), of which 0.02 square miles (0.05 km^{2}), or 0.46%, are water.

=== Streets ===
Main county roads include Castroville Boulevard, Dolan Road, Elkhorn Road, and Meridian Road. Castroville Boulevard leads southwest to Highway 156 and east to the Prunedale area and U.S. Route 101. Dolan Road leads west to Highway 1. Minor county roads include Del Monte Farms, Bayview Road, Walker Valley Road, Long Valley Road, Amaral Road, Paradise Canyon Road.

== Demographics ==
Historical population
Census	Pop.	Note	%±
1990	1,458		—
2000	1,591		9.1%
2010	1,565		−1.6%
2020	1,588		1.5%

=== 2020 census ===
As of the 2020 census, Elkhorn had a population of 1,588. The population density was 330.6 inhabitants per square mile (127.6/km^{2}). The median age was 39.9 years. For every 100 females, there were 93.7 males, and for every 100 females age 18 and over, there were 96.3 males age 18 and over.

The whole population lived in households. There were 539 households, out of which 178 (33.0%) had children under the age of 18 living in them, 304 (56.4%) were married-couple households, 49 (9.1%) were cohabiting couple households, 116 (21.5%) had a female householder with no partner present, and 70 (13.0%) had a male householder with no partner present. 100 households (18.6%) were one person, and 52 (9.6%) were one person aged 65 or older. The average household size was 2.95. There were 407 families (75.5% of all households).

The age distribution was 328 people (20.7%) under the age of 18, 148 people (9.3%) aged 18 to 24, 368 people (23.2%) aged 25 to 44, 431 people (27.1%) aged 45 to 64, and 313 people (19.7%) who were 65 years of age or older.

There were 558 housing units at an average density of 116.2 units per square mile (44.9 units/km^{2}), of which 539 (96.6%) were occupied. Of these, 408 (75.7%) were owner-occupied, and 131 (24.3%) were occupied by renters. There were 19 vacant housing units (3.4%). The homeowner vacancy rate was 0.5% and the rental vacancy rate was 0.0%.

0.0% of residents lived in urban areas, while 100.0% lived in rural areas.

Racial composition as of the 2020 census
Race	Number	Percent
White	767	48.3%
Black or African American	1	0.1%
American Indian and Alaska Native	31	2.0%
Asian	58	3.7%
Native Hawaiian and Other Pacific Islander	3	0.2%
Some other race	405	25.5%
Two or more races	323	20.3%
Hispanic or Latino (of any race)	753	47.4%

=== Income and poverty ===
In 2023, the US Census Bureau estimated that the median household income was $124,464, and the per capita income was $52,221. About 0.0% of families and 1.7% of the population were below the poverty line.

=== 2010 census ===
At the 2010 census Elkhorn had a population of 1,565. The population density was 324.0 inhabitants per square mile (125.1/km^{2}). The racial makeup of Elkhorn was 1,122 (71.7%) White, 9 (0.6%) African American, 7 (0.4%) Native American, 63 (4.0%) Asian, 3 (0.2%) Pacific Islander, 286 (18.3%) from other races, and 75 (4.8%) from two or more races. Hispanic or Latino of any race were 588 people (37.6%).

The whole population lived in households, no one lived in non-institutionalized group quarters and no one was institutionalized.

There were 532 households, 183 (34.4%) had children under the age of 18 living in them, 329 (61.8%) were opposite-sex married couples living together, 58 (10.9%) had a female householder with no husband present, 27 (5.1%) had a male householder with no wife present. There were 33 (6.2%) unmarried opposite-sex partnerships, and 2 (0.4%) same-sex married couples or partnerships. 95 households (17.9%) were one person and 29 (5.5%) had someone living alone who was 65 or older. The average household size was 2.94. There were 414 families (77.8% of households); the average family size was 3.21.

The age distribution was 364 people (23.3%) under the age of 18, 149 people (9.5%) aged 18 to 24, 349 people (22.3%) aged 25 to 44, 519 people (33.2%) aged 45 to 64, and 184 people (11.8%) who were 65 or older. The median age was 41.5 years. For every 100 females, there were 97.4 males. For every 100 females age 18 and over, there were 97.5 males.

There were 565 housing units at an average density of 117.0 per square mile, of the occupied units 380 (71.4%) were owner-occupied and 152 (28.6%) were rented. The homeowner vacancy rate was 1.3%; the rental vacancy rate was 0.6%. 1,098 people (70.2% of the population) lived in owner-occupied housing units and 467 people (29.8%) lived in rental housing units.

== Economy ==
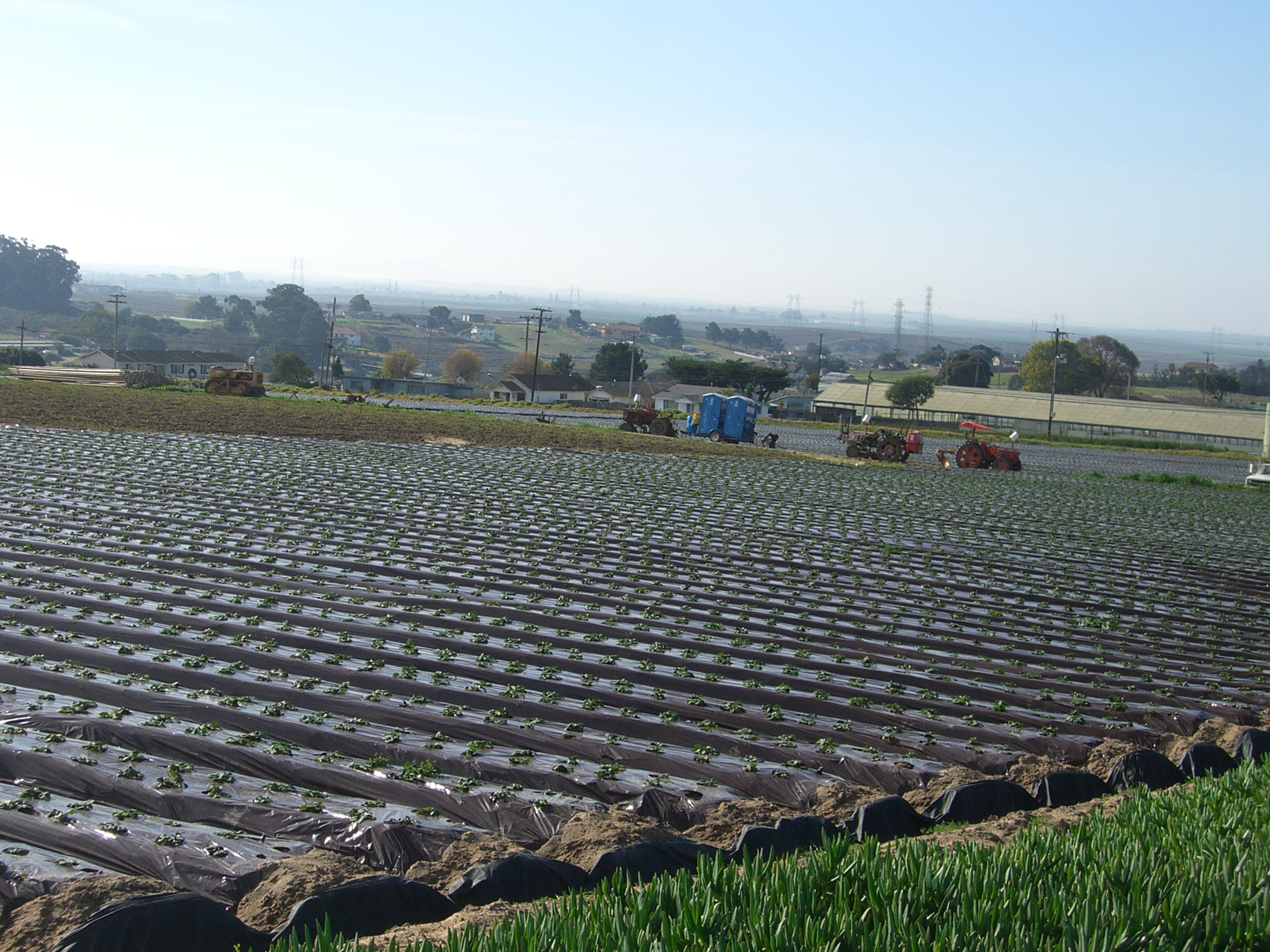
Strawberry fields in Elkhorn

Agricultural is a major part of Elkhorn's small economy. Strawberries and artichokes are key crops. Most Elkhorn residents work in the surrounding areas of Castroville, Prunedale, and Moss Landing, and in the nearby larger towns of Watsonville, Salinas, and Monterey. Elkhorn shares zip codes with nearby Castroville and Prunedale. Elkhorn has limited business and retail services. The only retail service in Elkhorn is the Elkhorn Superette which is located on the west side of Elkhorn Road, just north of Bayview Road. The nearest business and retail center is located about three miles (4.8 km) away in Castroville. However, many Elkhorn residents travel about 20 minutes to the nearby cities for greater retail and service needs such as department stores, movie theaters, and health services which are not located in Castroville.

== Government ==
As an unincorporated area, Elkhorn is administered by the Monterey County Board of Supervisors. Elkhorn is part of District 2, whose current supervisor is Glenn Church. The Board is responsible for providing all local public services. Elkhorn is located in the Coastal Zone and all new development is subject to approval by the California Coastal Commission.

== Education ==
Elkhorn Elementary School is the only school located in Elkhorn, and it serves the surrounding K-6 student population. Elkhorn Elementary is the polling site for Elkhorn voters. Middle school students in grades 7 and 8 currently attend North Monterey County Middle School and high school students in grades 9-12 attend North Monterey County High School, both located in Castroville. All local public schools are part of the North Monterey County Unified School District.

== Gallery ==
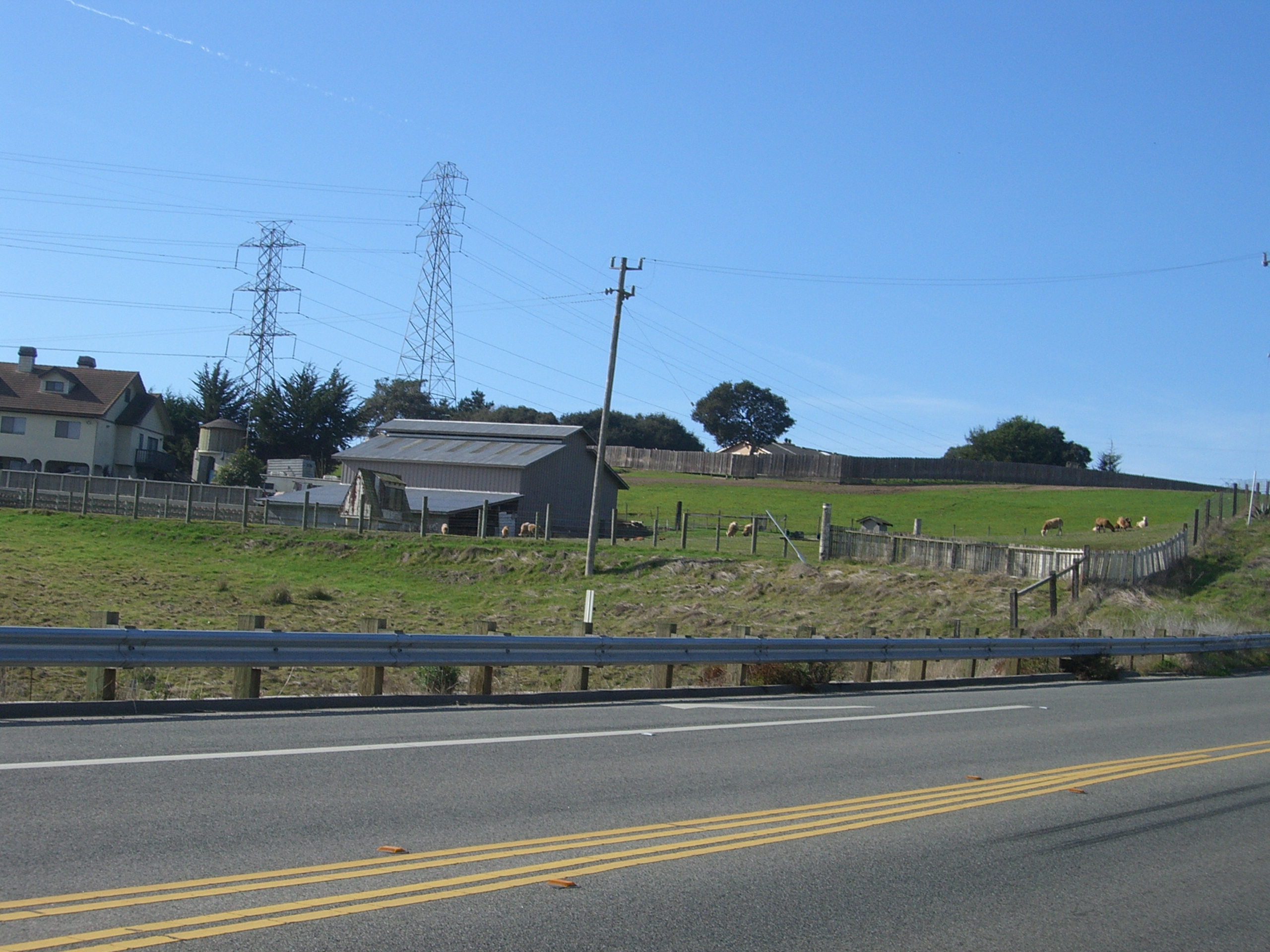
Dolan Road

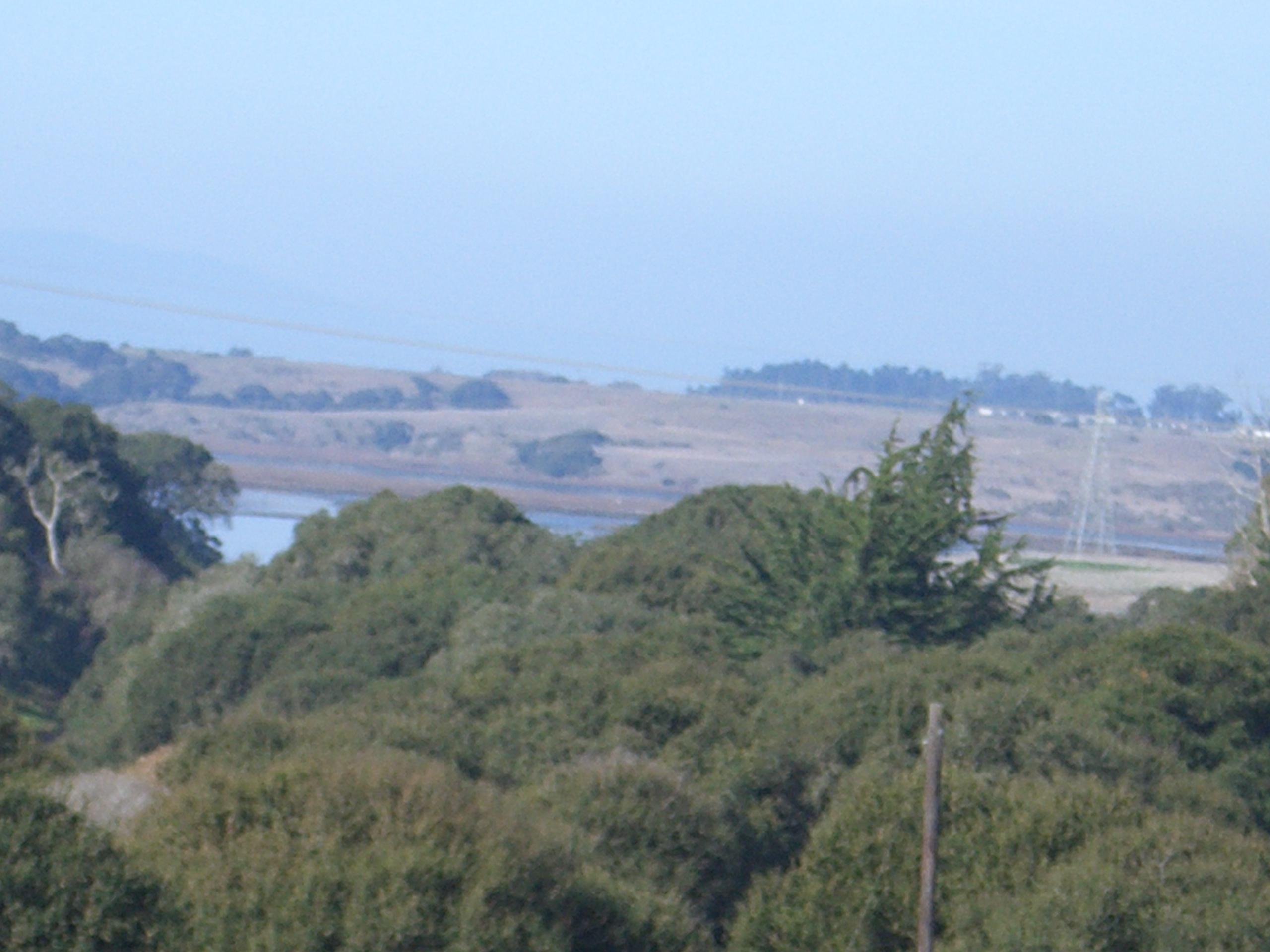
Elkhorn Slough in the distance

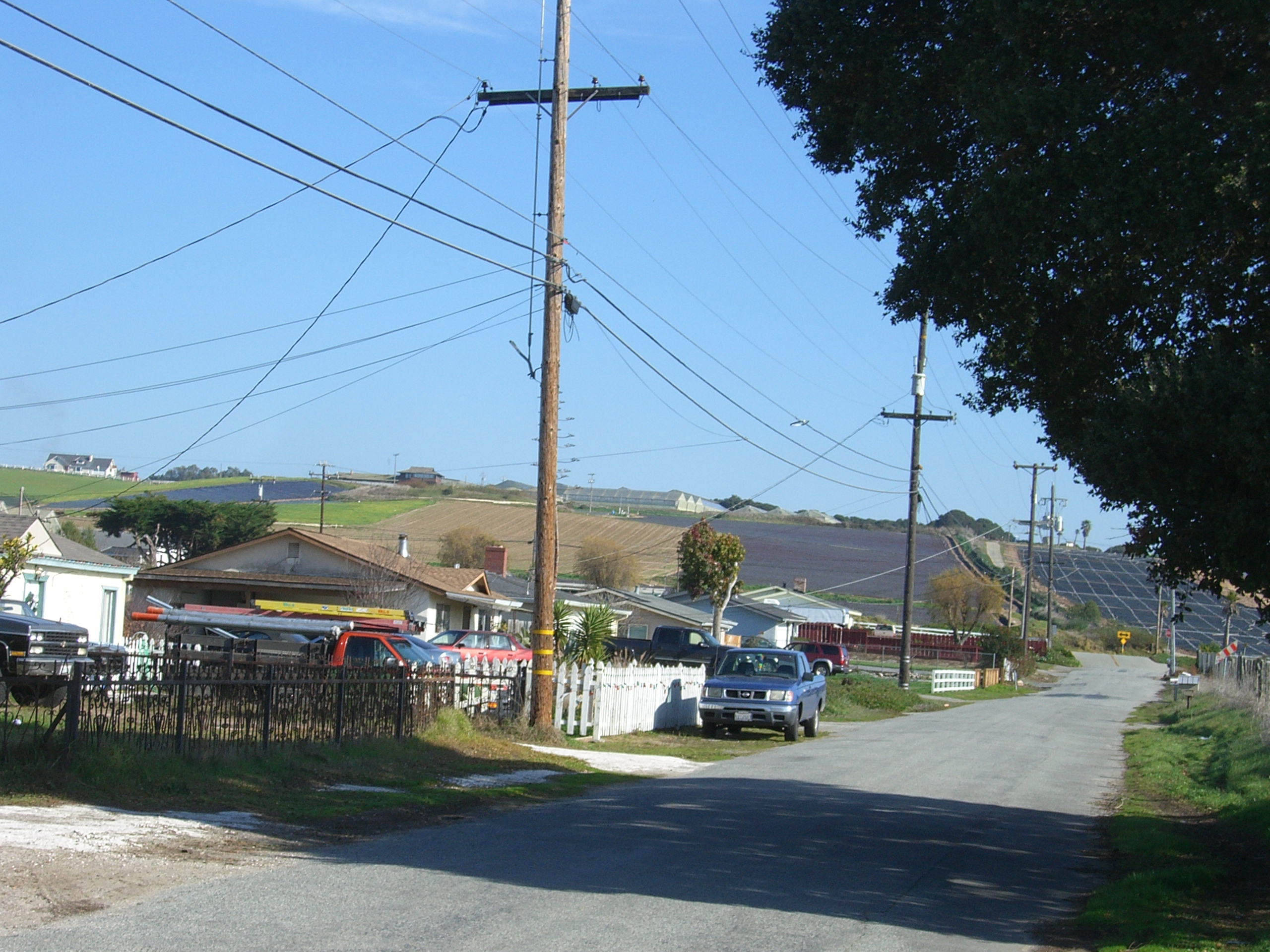
Homes near Castroville Blvd.

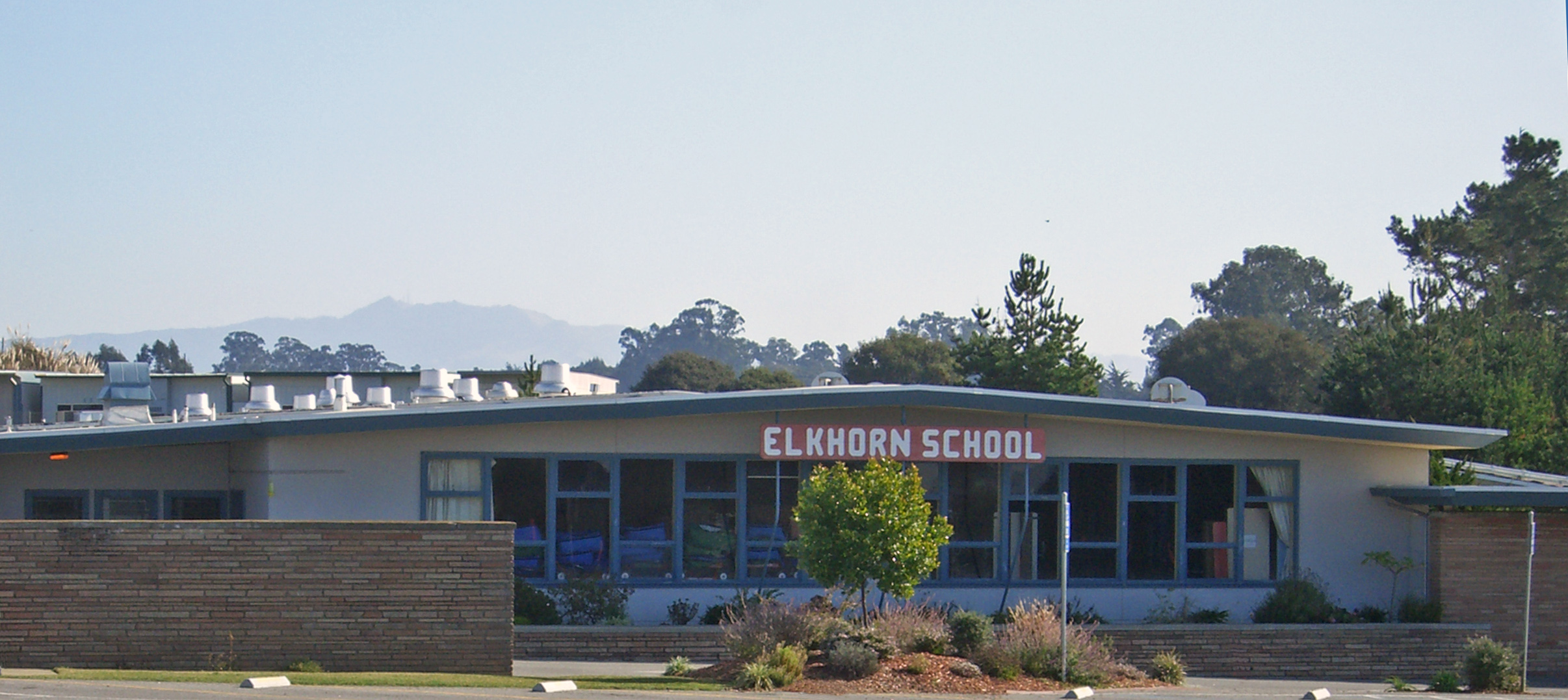
Elkhorn Elementary
