= Rancho Bolsa Nueva y Moro Cojo =

Mexican land grant in California

Coordinates: 36.800°N 121.690°W

Rancho Bolsa Nueva y Moro Cojo was a 30,901-acre (125.05 km^{2}) Mexican land grant in present-day Monterey County, California given in 1844 by Governor Manuel Micheltorena to María Antonia Pico de Castro. Literally translated, the name means "new pocket and lame moor". In the plains of Argentina and Uruguay, "moro" is the color of a horse, a special gray-bluish shade. This name must certainly be of Spanish origin, so it is not unreasonable to suppose that this Spanish name of a place in California does not refer to a "moor" (a muslim inhabitant of northern Africa, a very unlikely occurrence in California) but to a lame horse. The name "pocket" refers to pockets of land surrounded by marshes. The grant extended from Moss Landing on the Monterey Bay inland to present day Prunedale, and south to Castroville.

== History ==
The rancho comprises three grants that were later combined: (1) the two square league Rancho Moro Cojo granted by Governor Luís Antonio Argüello in 1825; (2) the one square league Rancho Bolsa Nueva by Governor Mariano Chico in 1836; and (3) the land in between granted by Governor Juan Alvarado to Simeon Castro in 1837.

José Simeon Nepomuncena Castro (1783–1842), son of Marcario Castro, was born in Santa Barbara. Simeon Castro was a soldier at Monterey in 1809, and alcalde at Monterey in 1838–39. He married Maria Antonia Pico (1804–1883). He was granted Rancho Punta del Año Nuevo in 1842. Simeon Castro died in 1842, and the whole property of eight square leagues regranted to his widow, María A. Pico de Castro, by Governor Micheltorena in 1844.

With the cession of California to the United States following the Mexican-American War, the 1848 Treaty of Guadalupe Hidalgo provided that the land grants would be honored. As required by the Land Act of 1851, a claim for Rancho Bolsa Nueva y Moro Cojo was filed with the Public Land Commission in 1853, and the grant was patented to Maria Antonio Pico de Castro in 1873.

Juan Bautista Castro (1835–1915), son of José Simeon Castro, founded Castroville in 1863.

== See also ==
- Ranchos of California
- List of Ranchos of California
