= Giant Artichoke =

Sculpture in California

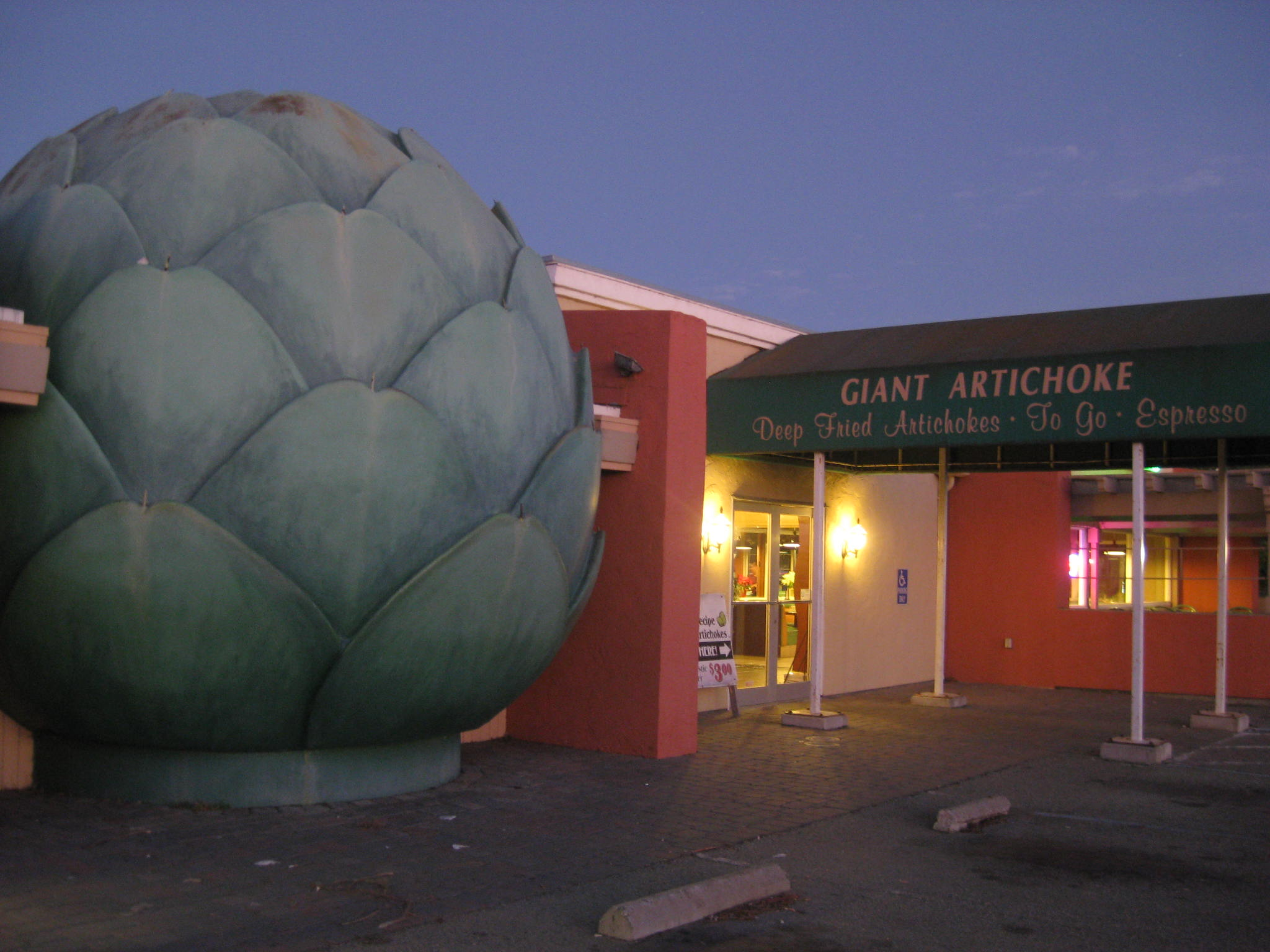
- The sculpture in 2009, next to the restaurant
- Artist: Ray Bei
- Year: 1963
- Medium: Concrete and rebar
- Subject: Artichoke
- Dimensions: 20 ft (6.1 m) tall 12 ft (3.7 m) wide
- 36.7624°N 121.7530°W

Giant Artichoke, also known as the World's Largest Artichoke, is a large sculpture of an artichoke in Castroville, California, commonly referred to as the "Artichoke Center of the World". It is located adjacent to the New American cuisine-serving restaurant of the same name. It is made from concrete and rebar.

== History ==
Ray Bei, the owner of a roadside restaurant and vegetable stand, built the sculpture in 1963. He was the son of a local artichoke farmer and found a way to convert the crop into a tourist attraction. Bei's fruit stand still stands next to his restaurant as of 2015.

== Restaurant ==
The restaurant next to the sculpture, also called the Giant Artichoke, serves a variety of artichoke-themed dishes, including deep-fried artichoke, steamed artichoke, roasted artichoke, artichoke pizza, artichoke dip, artichoke bread, artichoke cupcakes, and artichoke nachos.
