= Monterey County Board of Supervisors =

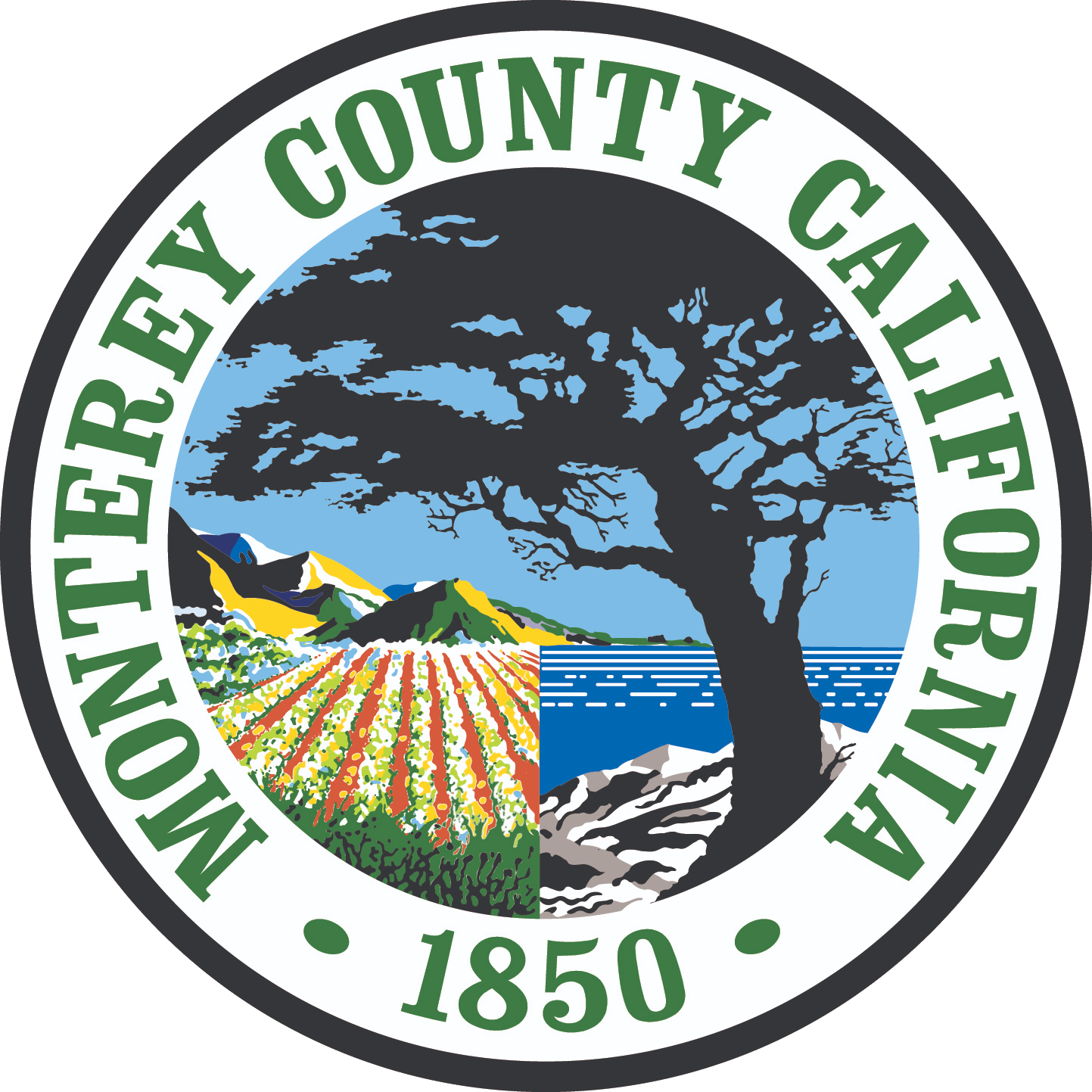
- Seal of Monterey County, California

Type
- Type: Unicameral

Structure
- Seats: 5
- Political groups: Democratic (5)
- Length of term: 4 years

Elections
- Voting system: Single-member districts

The Monterey County Board of Supervisors is the central governing body for Monterey County, California. The Board is made up of five elected officials, each of whom represent a distinct geographical district within the County.

== Background and composition ==
Under California Law, the board of supervisors is empowered with both legislative and executive authority over the entirety of Monterey County and is the primary governing body for all unincorporated areas within the County boundaries. Monterey County was one of the original counties of California, created in 1850 at the time of statehood, and served as the capital of Alta California under Spanish and Mexican rule. As of fiscal year 2011, the Board administered a county budget of nearly $385 million in current assets and $670 million in capital assets.

The Board has five elected members, each of whom represents one of five districts. Taken together, the five districts comprise the entirety of Monterey County.

Current Board Members:

- Luis Alejo - 1st district
- Glenn Church - 2nd district
- Chris Lopez - 3rd district (2025 Chair)
- Wendy Root Askew - 4th district (2025 Vice-Chair)
- Kate Daniels - 5th district

The Board conducts its meetings in the county seat, Salinas, and is a member of the regional governmental agency, the Association of Monterey Bay Area Governments.

== Districts ==
Supervisorial district boundaries are divided roughly equally according to population, using data from the most recent census. In addition, any redistricting changes must comply with both California law as well as the federal Voting Rights Act. Boundaries are adjusted decennially based on data reported by the United States Census Bureau for the most recent census.

=== District 1 ===
The 1st district is geographically the smallest supervisorial district in Monterey County and falls entirely within the city limits of the city of Salinas.

Luis Alejo represents the 1st district on the board of supervisors.

=== District 2 ===
As the northernmost supervisorial district in Monterey County, the 2nd district includes the communities of Boronda, Castroville, Las Lomas, Moss Landing, Pajaro, Prunedale, Royal Oaks, the northern neighborhoods of the city of Salinas, and those portions of the community of Aromas that are located within Monterey County.

Glenn Church is the current supervisor for the 2nd district.

=== District 3 ===
The 3rd District covers the majority of the Salinas Valley and southern Monterey County, extending to its border with San Luis Obispo County. The district includes the unincorporated communities of Spreckels, Chualar, and Jolon; the eastern portion of the city of Salinas; the cities of Gonzales, Greenfield, Soledad, and King City; the military installations at Fort Hunter Liggett and Camp Roberts; and portions of the Los Padres National Forest.

The 3rd district is represented by Chris Lopez.

=== District 4 ===
The 4th district includes the southwest portion of the city of Salinas, the cities of Del Rey Oaks, Marina, Seaside, Sand City, and the unincorporated communities of CSUMB and East Garrison and the former military installation at Fort Ord.

Wendy Root Askew currently holds the seat for 4th district supervisor.

=== District 5 ===
The 5th district is geographically the largest of the five supervisorial districts, and covers most of the Monterey Peninsula and southern coastline of Monterey County down to the southern county border with San Luis Obispo County. The 5th District includes the cities of Carmel-by-the-Sea, Monterey, and Pacific Grove; the unincorporated communities of Carmel Valley, Big Sur, Pebble Beach, San Benancio, Corral de Tierra, and Jamesburg; military installations at the Presidio of Monterey, the Defense Language Institute, and the Naval Postgraduate School; and the Ventana Wilderness area of the Los Padres National Forest.

Kate Daniels is currently the 5th district supervisor.
