= Jamie Iredell =

American writer (born 1976)

- Born: August 10, 1976 (age 50); Carmel-by-the-Sea, California, U.S.
- Education: North Monterey County High School
- Occupations: Writer, professor
- Writing career
- Genres: Fiction, Nonfiction, Poetry
- Notable work: Last Mass

Jamie Iredell (born August 10, 1976) is an American writer.

== Early life ==
Iredell grew up in Castroville, California, and attended North Monterey County High School. He earned his Bachelor's and Master's degrees in English from the University of Nevada, Reno, and his PhD. in English from Georgia State University.

== Career ==
Iredell's writing has been positively reviewed by The Atlanta Journal-Constitution and The Brooklyn Rail.

Writing in 2010, the Quarterly Conversation said of Prose, Poems, a Novel that "The title of the collection serves as a bold declaration of war on the boundaries of genre. Iredell is not flouting the rules of genre, though. Instead, Iredell weaves his three titular genres together into a form that is all its own, containing elements of each."

Nailed Magazine wrote of The Book of Freaks in 2011, that “Iredell has produced an absolute masterpiece of the absurd and surreal – a faux-encyclopedia that contains pieces of everything and everyone you have ever encountered in your life.”

In 2014, Publishers Weekly noted of I Was a Fat Drunk Catholic School Insomniac, that it is “An entertaining and insightful collection often interested in the messy and difficult aspects of life.”

Los Angeles Magazine listed Last Mass among "6 Books You Need to Read this August" in 2015. Also, in 2015, Slate wrote about Last Mass as “An exemplary work of creative nonfiction in the vein of Maggie Nelson’s Argonauts."

The Atlanta Journal-Constitution has called his writing "wildly imaginative". His 2018 novel The Fat Kid drew comparison to Cormac McCarthy.

In addition to writing, he teaches college literature and creative writing.

== Scholarship on Works ==
In his 2018 critical study, Poetry in the Novel, scholar Adrian Kempton assesses Iredell's work in the fifth chapter: "Borderline Vignettes: Jamie Iredell's Prose. Poems. a novel." Kempton writes that the book's title "draw[s] attention to its unclassifiable generic status" and that the pieces within are fairly regulated prose pieces in mostly right and left justified "blocks" containing "lines of nine to twelve syllables, with four or five main stresses in each." Kempton notes that the book is reminiscent of Beat writers, such as Burroughs and Kerouac, and that Iredell over-relies on simile and--"glaringly forced"—analogy. However, he also writes that the pieces that make up Iredell's book "ultimately form a consistent whole" with "parallel movement in the narrative across time levels."

== Bibliography ==
- Prose, Poems, a Novel (Orange Alert Press, 2009) ISBN 978-0981748122.
- The Book of Freaks (Future Tense Books, 2010) ISBN 978-1892061393.
- I Was a Fat Drunk Catholic School Insomniac (Future Tense Books, 2011) ISBN 978-1892061461.
- Last Mass (Civil Coping Mechanisms, 2015) ISBN 978-1937865429.
- The Fat Kid (Civil Coping Mechanisms, 2018) ISBN 978-1948700085.
