= Royal Oaks Park =

Park in California

Coordinates: 36.840°N 121.666°W

Royal Oaks Park is a 122-acre county park in Monterey County, California.

== History ==
The park was created by the County board of Supervisors in 1966. It was the County's first park.

== Features ==
The park offers a softball field, tennis, basketball, and volleyball courts, and a playground.
