= Prunedale, California =

- Unincorporated community Census-designated place
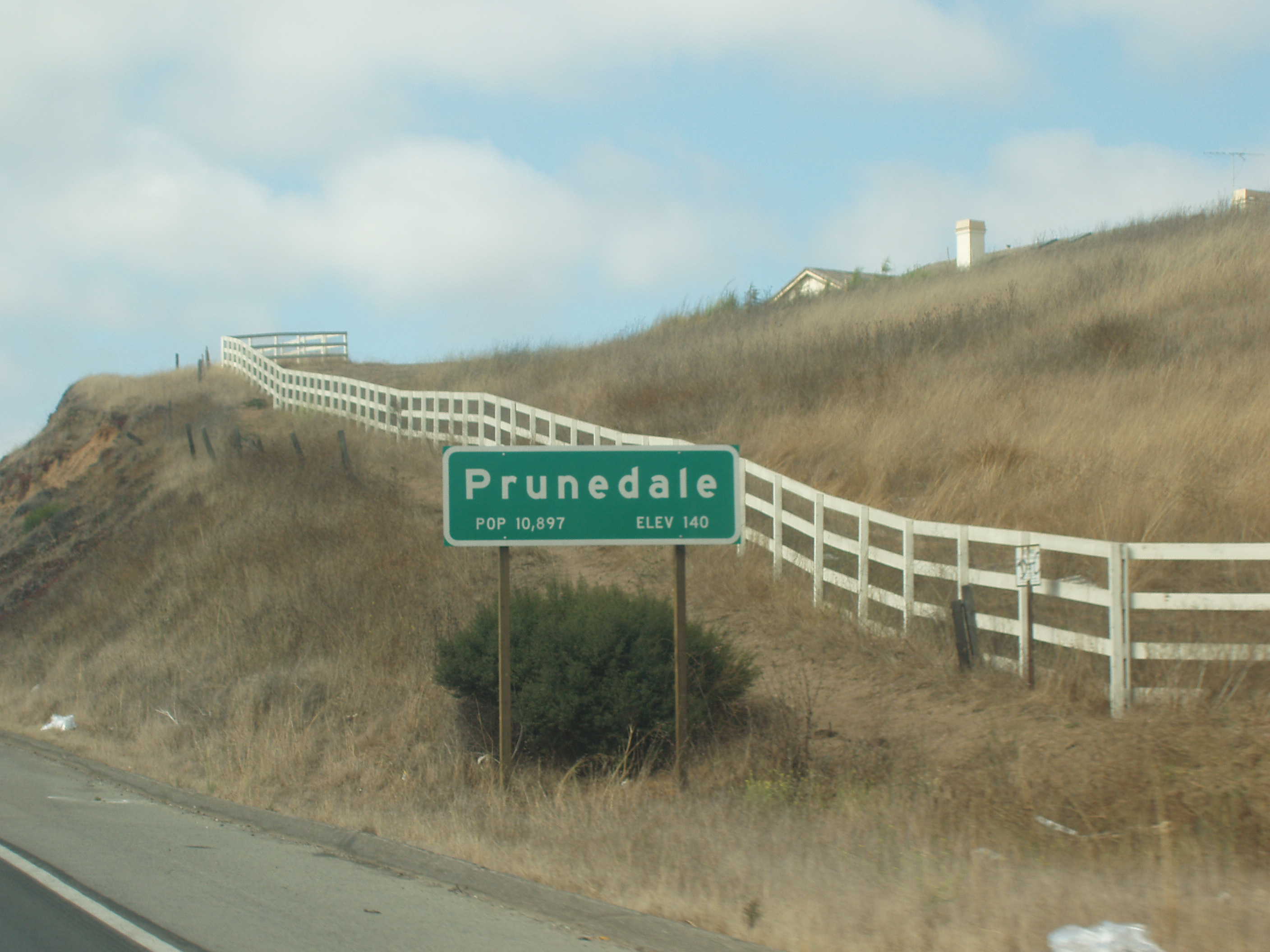
- Population sign for Prunedale along northbound Highway 101
- Interactive map of Prunedale, California
- Location in the United States
- Coordinates: 36°46′33″N 121°40′11″W
- Country: United States
- State: California
- County: Monterey

Government
  - State Senator: John Laird (D)
  - Assemblymember: Robert Rivas (D)
  - U. S. Rep.: Zoe Lofgren (D); Jimmy Panetta (D)

Area
  - Total: 46.204 sq mi (119.67 km^{2})
  - Land: 46.062 sq mi (119.30 km^{2})
  - Water: 0.142 sq mi (0.37 km^{2}) 0.31%
- Elevation: 92 ft (28 m)

Population (2020)
  - Total: 18,885
  - Density: 410/sq mi (160/km^{2})
- Time zone: UTC-8 (PST)
  - Summer (DST): UTC-7 (PDT)
- ZIP codes: 93907 (Prunedale); 95012 (Castroville); 95076 (Watsonville); 95004 (Aromas)
- Area code: 831
- FIPS code: 06-58870
- GNIS feature ID: 0277580

Prunedale is an unincorporated community in Monterey County, California, United States. It is located 8 miles (13 km) north of Salinas at an elevation of 92 feet (28 m). The population was 18,885 as of the 2020 census, up from 17,560 in 2010. For statistical purposes, the United States Census Bureau has defined Prunedale as a census-designated place (CDP). Plum trees were grown in Prunedale in the early days of its founding, but the trees died soon after due to poor irrigation and fertilizer.

== History ==
One of the area's earliest settlers was Charles Langley, a Watsonville banker, who also operated the Prunedale post office, which opened in 1894, closed in 1908, and re-opened in 1953. Langley helped establish the Watsonville post office mail service in Prunedale. Langley Canyon Road in Prunedale is named after the Langley family. It was around the time of Prunedale's founding that the plum orchard failed due to a lack of irrigation and fertilizer, yet the name Prunedale was retained. The unincorporated area maintains a rural feel in most areas.

A major development in the area's history occurred when U.S. Route 101 was rerouted through Prunedale between 1931 and 1932. U.S. Highway 101 had previously run directly from Salinas to San Juan Bautista. That old route is now known as San Juan Grade Road. In 1946, Highway 101 was widened to four lanes. As Prunedale has grown, increased traffic congestion made Route 101 through Prunedale a Traffic Safety Corridor and a double traffic fine zone in the late 1990s and early 2000s, with reduced speed limits to 55 miles per hour. Detailed plans to build a 101 bypass of Prunedale did not develop. After Caltrans purchased the land for the bypass, it was resolved to improve the highway through Prunedale by adding a San Miguel Canyon overpass, improving the Highway 101 and Highway 156 interchange, making more turn and merge lanes, and making several other improvements on the roadway. These improvements were completed in the early 2000s. In the last few years, with a decline in traffic fatalities, the speed limit was increased to 60 miles per hour via state traffic formulas.

One of the original businesses to inhabit Prunedale was Glenn's. In the 1970s, the Prunedale Shopping Center was built. The Prunedale Senior Citizens' Center was built in 1989 with grant funds secured by then Monterey County Supervisor Marc Del Piero. Meals for seniors and public assistance programs, including a bi-weekly food bank giveaway, continue to be operated from that facility.

== Geography ==
Prunedale is located in northern Monterey County at 36°46′33″N 121°40′11″W. It is bordered to the northeast by San Benito County, to the north by the community of Aromas, and to the west by the community of Elkhorn. Via U.S. Route 101, Salinas, the county seat, is 7 miles (11 km) to the south, while Gilroy is 20 miles (32 km) to the north.

According to the United States Census Bureau, the CDP has a total area of 46.2 square miles (120 km^{2}), of which 0.1 square miles (0.26 km^{2}), or 0.31%, are water. Langley Creek flows by Highway 101 through Prunedale, and is visible at the intersection of Highway 101 and Tustin Road, and again at the intersection of Prunedale South Road and Blackie Road.

At the 1990 U.S. census, the CDP had an area of 10.2 square miles (26 km^{2}), all land. The CDP was enlarged to the current size at the 2000 U.S. census.

== Demographics ==
Historical population
Census	Pop.	Note	%±
1990	7,393		—
2000	16,432		122.3%
2010	17,560		6.9%
2020	18,885		7.5%
U.S. Decennial Census; 1990 2000 2010

Prunedale first appeared as a census designated place in the 1990 U.S. census.

=== 2020 census ===
As of the 2020 census, Prunedale had a population of 18,885, and the population density was 410.0 inhabitants per square mile (158.3/km^{2}).

Racial composition as of the 2020 census
Race	Number	Percent
White	8,788	46.5%
Black or African American	132	0.7%
American Indian and Alaska Native	481	2.5%
Asian	646	3.4%
Native Hawaiian and Other Pacific Islander	58	0.3%
Some other race	5,189	27.5%
Two or more races	3,591	19.0%
Hispanic or Latino (of any race)	9,869	52.3%

The census reported that 99.6% of the population lived in households, 66 people (0.3%) lived in non-institutionalized group quarters, and 9 people (0.0%) were institutionalized.

The age distribution was 22.2% under the age of 18, 8.5% aged 18 to 24, 23.7% aged 25 to 44, 27.2% aged 45 to 64, and 18.4% who were 65 years of age or older. The median age was 40.8 years. For every 100 females, there were 102.2 males, and for every 100 females age 18 and over, there were 101.4 males age 18 and over.

66.1% of residents lived in urban areas, while 33.9% lived in rural areas.

There were 5,914 households; 34.0% had children under the age of 18 living in them. Of all households, 59.2% were married-couple households, 6.5% were cohabiting couple households, 19.4% had a female householder with no spouse or partner present, and 14.9% had a male householder with no spouse or partner present. About 17.1% of households were made up of individuals, and 9.1% had someone living alone who was 65 years of age or older. The average household size was 3.18. There were 4,564 families (77.2% of households).

There were 6,124 housing units at an average density of 133.0 units per square mile (51.4 units/km^{2}), of which 5,914 (96.6%) were occupied. Of these, 78.2% were owner-occupied and 21.8% were occupied by renters. The overall vacancy rate was 3.4%; the homeowner vacancy rate was 0.6% and the rental vacancy rate was 1.7%.

=== 2023 ACS estimates ===
In 2023, the US Census Bureau estimated that 22.3% of the population were foreign-born. Of all people aged 5 or older, 50.7% spoke only English at home, 44.1% spoke Spanish, 1.9% spoke other Indo-European languages, 3.2% spoke Asian or Pacific Islander languages, and 0.1% spoke other languages. Of those aged 25 or older, 77.3% were high school graduates and 22.2% had a bachelor's degree.

The median household income in 2023 was $106,442, and the per capita income was $42,602. About 3.2% of families and 8.5% of the population were below the poverty line.

=== 2010 census ===
At the 2010 census Prunedale had a population of 17,560. The population density was 380.1 inhabitants per square mile (146.8/km^{2}). The racial makeup of Prunedale was 11,771 (67.0%) White, 177 (1.0%) African American, 199 (1.1%) Native American, 672 (3.8%) Asian, 58 (0.3%) Pacific Islander, 3,639 (20.7%) from other races, and 1,044 (5.9%) from two or more races. Hispanic or Latino of any race were 7,322 persons (41.7%).

The census reported that 17,552 people (100% of the population) lived in households, 2 (0%) lived in non-institutionalized group quarters, and 6 (0%) were institutionalized.

There were 5,703 households, 2,130 (37.3%) had children under the age of 18 living in them, 3,607 (63.2%) were opposite-sex married couples living together, 513 (9.0%) had a female householder with no husband present, 323 (5.7%) had a male householder with no wife present. There were 340 (6.0%) unmarried opposite-sex partnerships, and 54 (0.9%) same-sex married couples or partnerships. 923 households (16.2%) were one person and 367 (6.4%) had someone living alone who was 65 or older. The average household size was 3.08. There were 4,443 families (77.9% of households); the average family size was 3.45.

The age distribution was 4,348 people (24.8%) under the age of 18, 1,575 people (9.0%) aged 18 to 24, 3,933 people (22.4%) aged 25 to 44, 5,647 people (32.2%) aged 45 to 64, and 2,057 people (11.7%) who were 65 or older. The median age was 40.1 years. For every 100 females, there were 101.7 males. For every 100 females age 18 and over, there were 100.2 males.

There were 6,047 housing units at an average density of 130.9 per square mile, of the occupied units 4,352 (76.3%) were owner-occupied and 1,351 (23.7%) were rented. The homeowner vacancy rate was 1.9%; the rental vacancy rate was 3.8%. 13,101 people (74.6% of the population) lived in owner-occupied housing units and 4,451 people (25.3%) lived in rental housing units.

== Transportation ==
Prunedale is served by Monterey–Salinas Transit, with connections to Amtrak at San Jose Diridon station. Caltrans has a park and ride at the intersection of US Route 101 and California State Route 156.

== Environmental ==
In the hills above Prunedale is one of the few known colonies of Yadon's piperia, an endangered species of wild orchid. Royal Oaks Park and Manzanita Park, owned by Monterey County, offer nearby recreation. Much of Prunedale's land is oak reserve to protect the California's native trees.

== Gallery ==
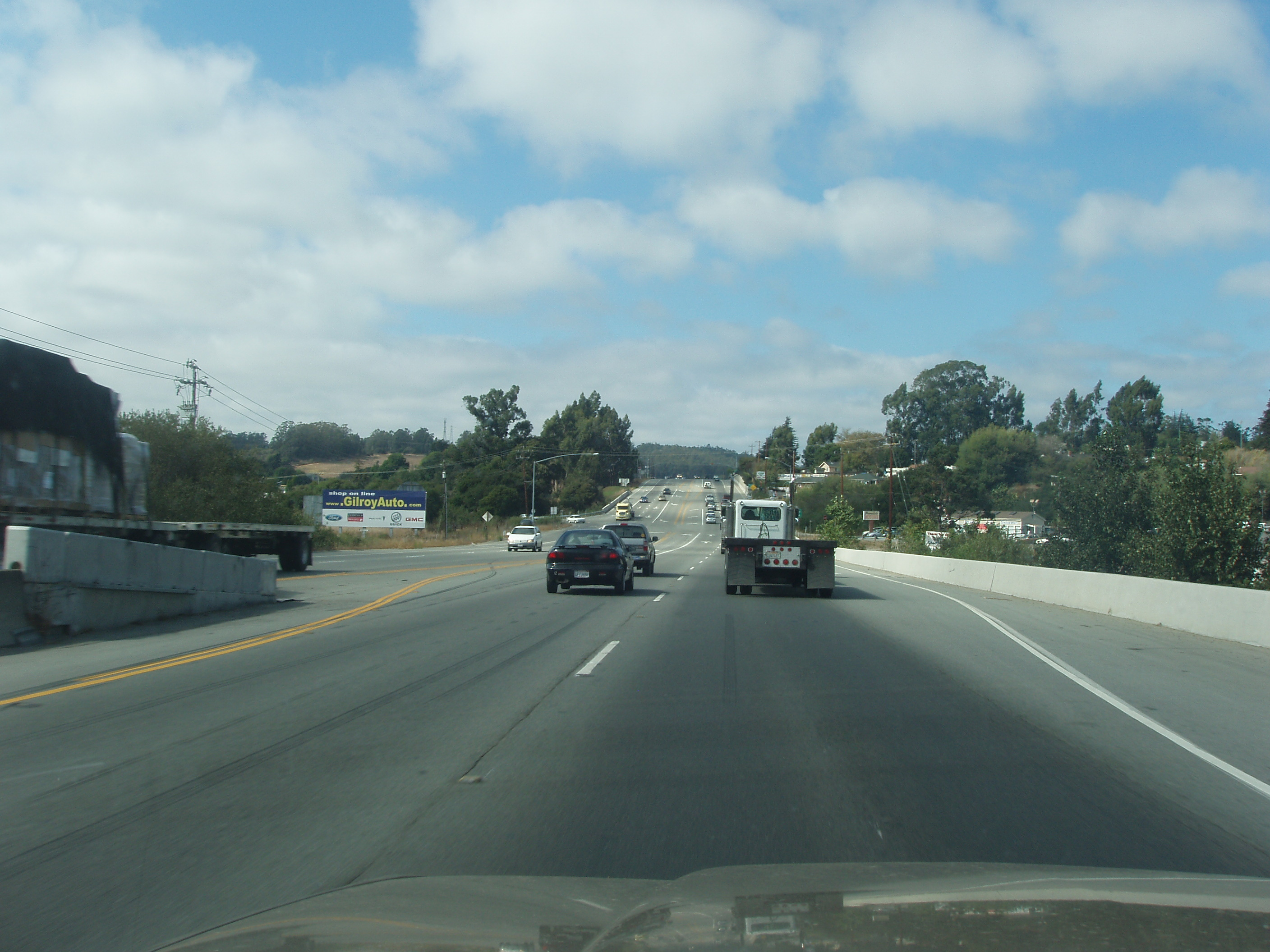
Highway 101 through Prunedale heading north

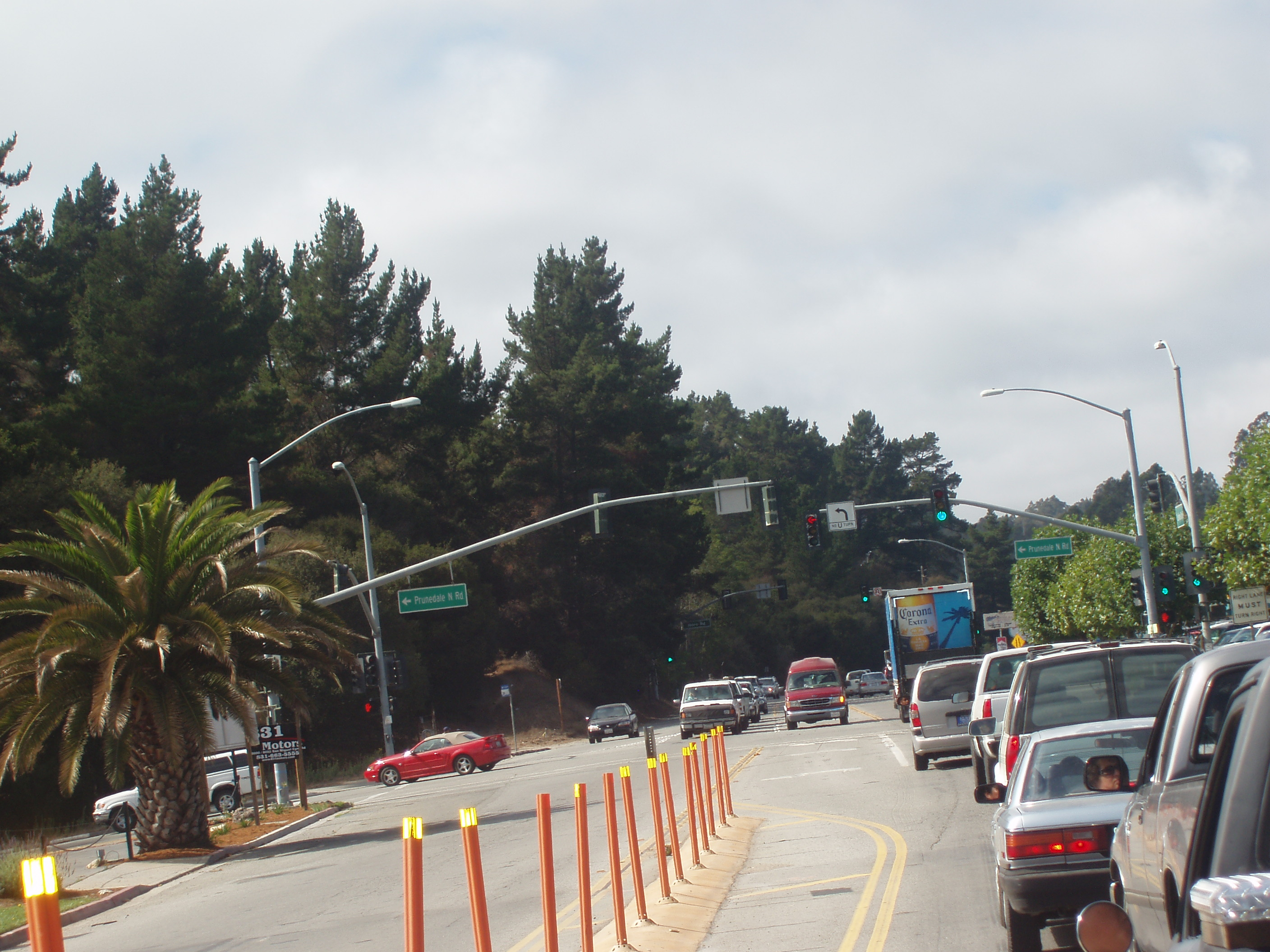
San Miguel Canyon Prunedale North intersection in Prunedale

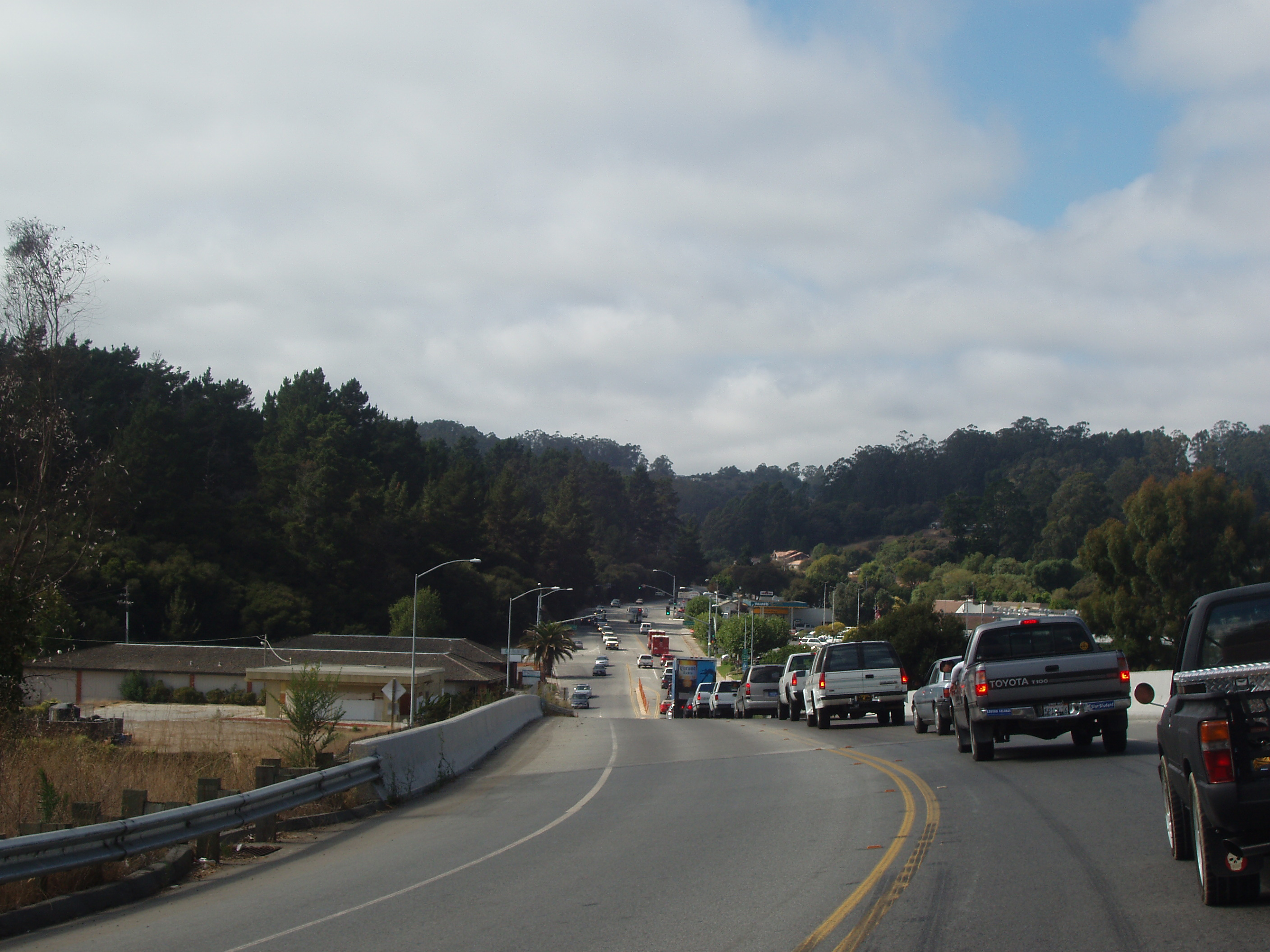
San Miguel Canyon Road from the 101 overpass in Prunedale

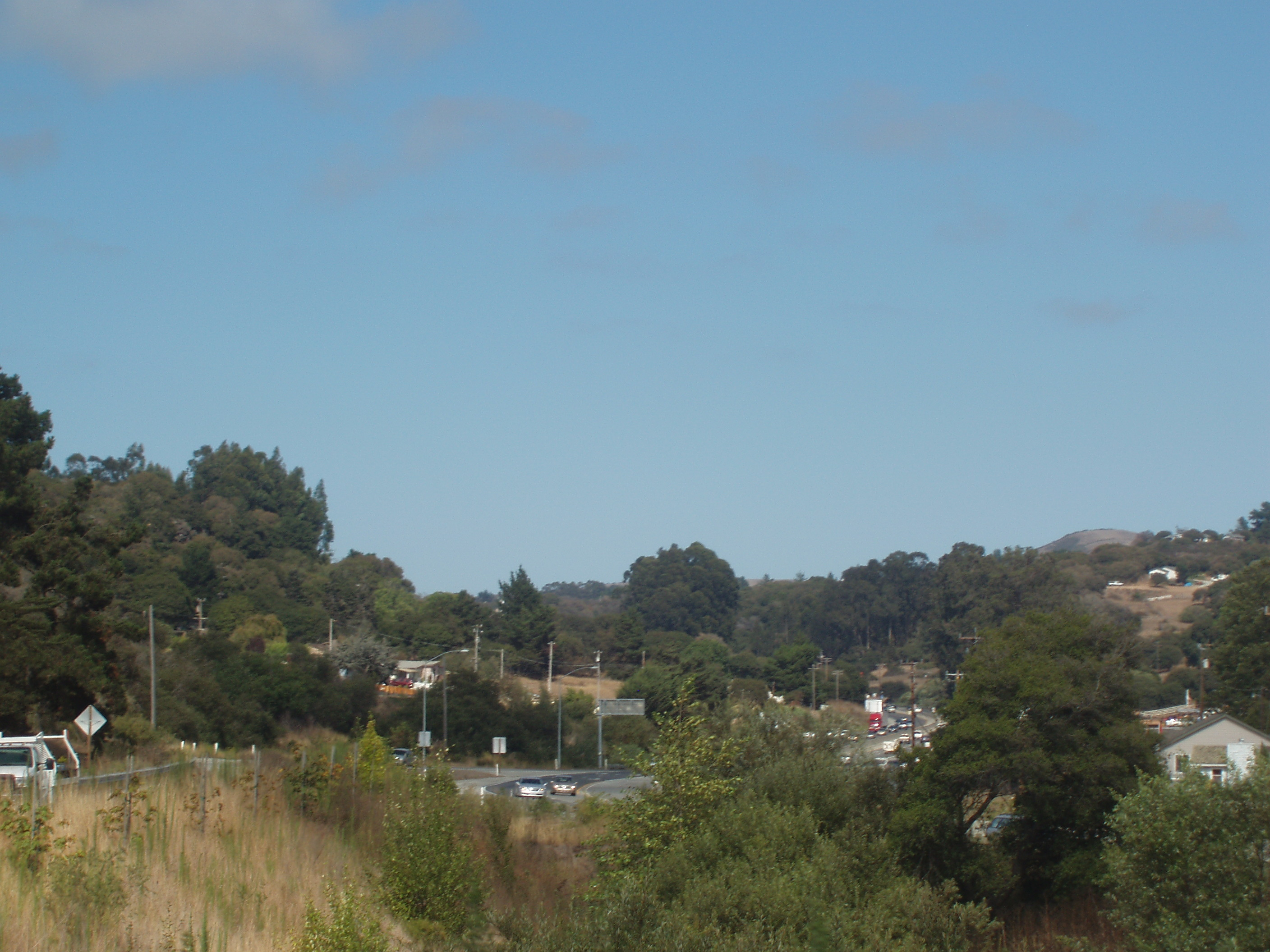
View of 101 heading north from San Miguel Canyon Road overpass in Prunedale
