= Castroville, California =

Unincorporated community in California, United States

- Census-designated place
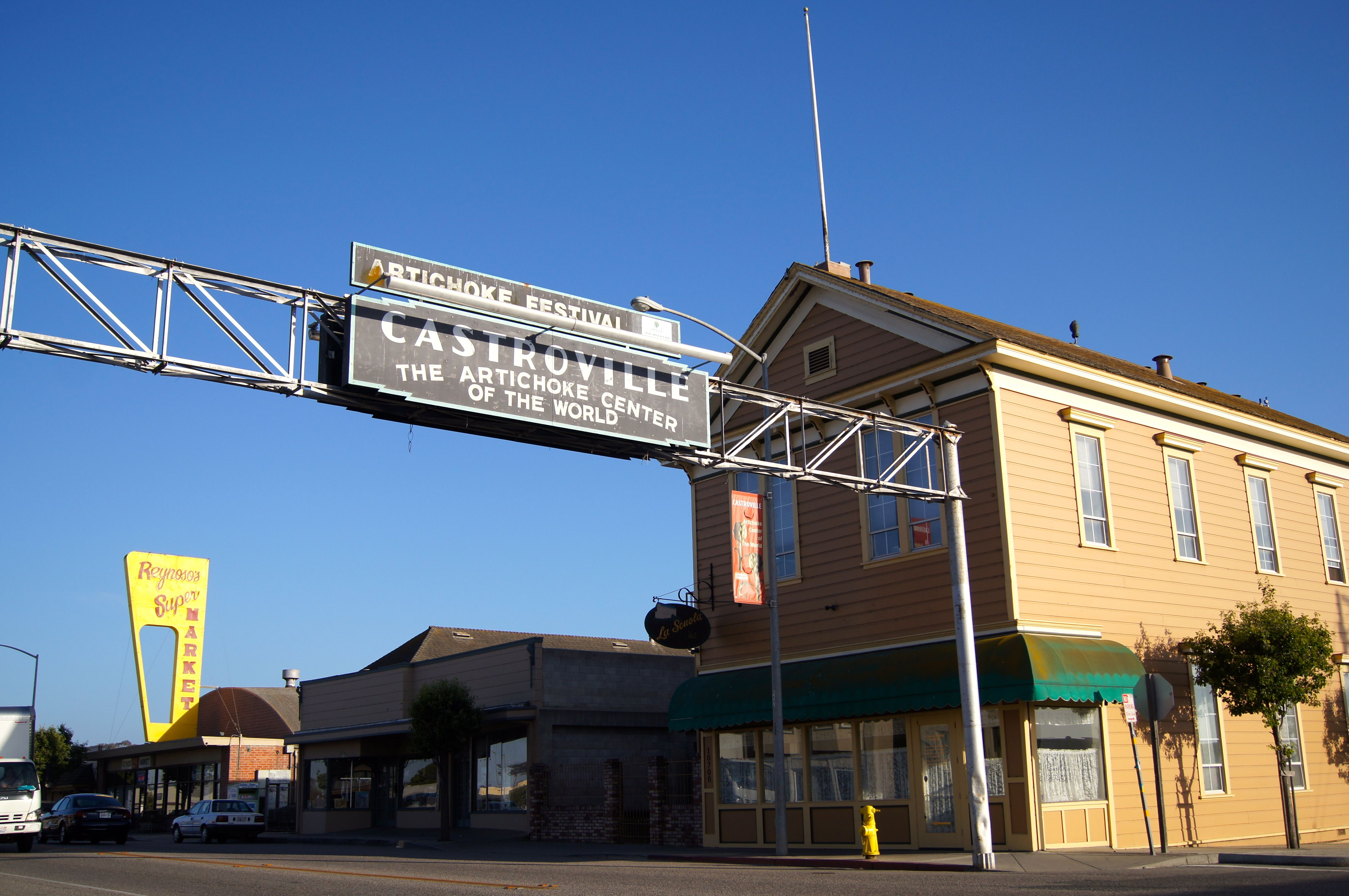
- Castroville sign and La Scuola on Merritt Street
- Nickname: "The Artichoke Center of the World"
- Location in Monterey County and the state of California

- Location in the United States
- Coordinates: 36°45′57″N 121°45′29″W
- Country: United States
- State: California
- County: Monterey
- Founded: 1863

Government
  - Type: N/A
  - State senator: John Laird (D)
  - Assemblymember: Robert Rivas (D)
  - U. S. Congress: Zoe Lofgren (D)

Area
  - Total: 1.02 sq mi (2.6 km^{2})
  - Land: 1.02 sq mi (2.6 km^{2})
  - Water: 0.00 sq mi (0 km^{2}) 0%
- Elevation: 23 ft (7 m)

Population (2020)
  - Total: 7,515
  - Density: 7,353.23/sq mi (2,839.10/km^{2})
- Time zone: UTC-8 (PST)
  - Summer (DST): UTC-7 (PDT)
- ZIP code: 95012
- Area code: 831
- FIPS code: 06-11978
- GNIS feature ID: 277486

Castroville is an unincorporated town and census-designated place (CDP) in Monterey County, California, United States. At the time of the 2020 census the population was 7,515, up from 6,481 in 2010. Castroville is known for its artichoke crop and for the annual Castroville Artichoke Festival, leading to its nickname as the "Artichoke Center of the World".

The community's origins lie in Rancho Bolsa Nueva y Moro Cojo, a Mexican-era rancho granted to the Castro family of Californio rancheros. Following the American Conquest of California, Juan Bautista Castro founded Castroville in 1863.

== History ==
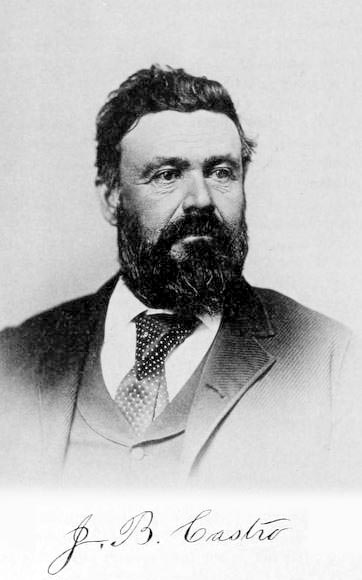
Juan Bautista Castro, founder of Castroville

=== Rancho Bolsa Nueva y Moro Cojo ===
Rancho Bolsa Nueva y Moro Cojo was a 30,901-acre (125.05 km^{2}) Mexican land grant given in 1844 by Governor Manuel Micheltorena to Maria Antonia Pico de Castro, Juan Bautista Castro's mother. Rancho Bolsa Nueva y Moro Cojo is a combination of three land grants: Rancho Bolsa Nueva y Moro Cojo, given in 1844 by Governor Micheltorena to María Antonia Pico de Castro; Rancho Bolsa del Potrero y Moro Cojo, in 1822 by Governor Pablo Vicente de Solá to Joaquín de la Torre.; and the land between the other two, granted by Governor Juan Alvarado to Simeon Castro (Juan Bautista Castro's father) in 1837.

Lake Merritt and the sloughs were popular for fishing and hunting. The area around Castroville was crisscrossed by a network of sloughs and swamps. In the 1840s, mapmaker Duflot de Mofras wrote, "A few leagues before reaching the Pajaro River, an area measuring a few hundred meters where the ground trembles under the horses feet, although the earth is hard and covered by turf, is encountered. The land is probably formed by a solid crust superimposed on a vast miry base."

=== Castroville from 1850 ===
The town site was divided into 50-by-130-foot (15.2 by 39.6 m) blocks, with an alley running through each block. A lottery was established, and 100 lots were given away to any person who would clear land and build homes. In 1870 Manuel R. Merritt, editor of the Castroville Argus, announced, "We will give alternate lots, on any part of the town site we still own… to any person who will build as practicable, a good comfortable dwelling house on his lot."

Juan Bautista Castro ran for county supervisor for the district. Castro, Merritt, Geil and others traveled to the oldest settlement of Sotoville in Salinas, where the Indians and Paisanos lived. They packed their belongings. Castro packed the tortilla cast iron pans, personal items and moved the people to Juan Pomber's hotel for ninety days. They were registered and became ready to vote. They were not able to read in English, so the ballots were translated for them. Juan Bautista Castro won the office of supervisor of his district. Juan Pomber became roadmaster of the district. The county supplied money and low-income housing was built on the donated lots.

In 1875, Castroville had 900 residents. There were two hotels, five stores, stables, three saloons, a flour mill, two blacksmith shops, a newspaper, a post office, a telegraph office, a drugstore, a tailor shop, a shoemaker, two churches, a school house, a tin shop, and a brewery.

The Southern Pacific Railroad began extending its line south from Gilroy. Juan Bautista Castro had ambitions of Castroville becoming the new station freight depot. Castroville's asking price for the land was high. Salinas offered the land for free, and was selected over Castroville. Castroville was still considered an important stop, serving as the "point of juncture of the road from Monterey, and from Soledad to San Francisco." The first roundhouse was built in Castroville.

=== Castroville Argus newspaper ===
The Castroville Argus was established on July 17, 1869. The publishers were Juan Bautista Castro and Joseph R. Merritt. The editors were Manuel R. Merritt (nephew of Juan Bautista Castro) and S.F. Geil. The office was in the Hicks Building (hardware store, later turned into school house, La Scuola) on the corner of Merritt and Poole Streets. It was a weekly paper and a new edition was available every Saturday.

Joseph Merritt was born April 19, 1851. He was publisher for the Monterey Democrat and the Castroville Argus. In 1882, he was editor of the San Jose Mercury. In 1884, he was on the editorial staff of the San Jose Daily Herald. He married Annie Phillips in 1872. He died at the age of 36.

Manuel R. Merritt was born June 8, 1855. He was the editor of the Castroville Argus, Castroville Gazette, and the Monterey County Herald. In 1878 he was in the mercantile business, elected supervisor of Monterey County from the First District. Four times he was a delegate to the Democratic State Convention. He served as Secretary and as chairman for the Democratic County Committee. He became Postmaster and Justice of the Peace. Real estate and insurance business. He died at the age of 48 from an accidental gunshot wound.

=== Chinatown ===
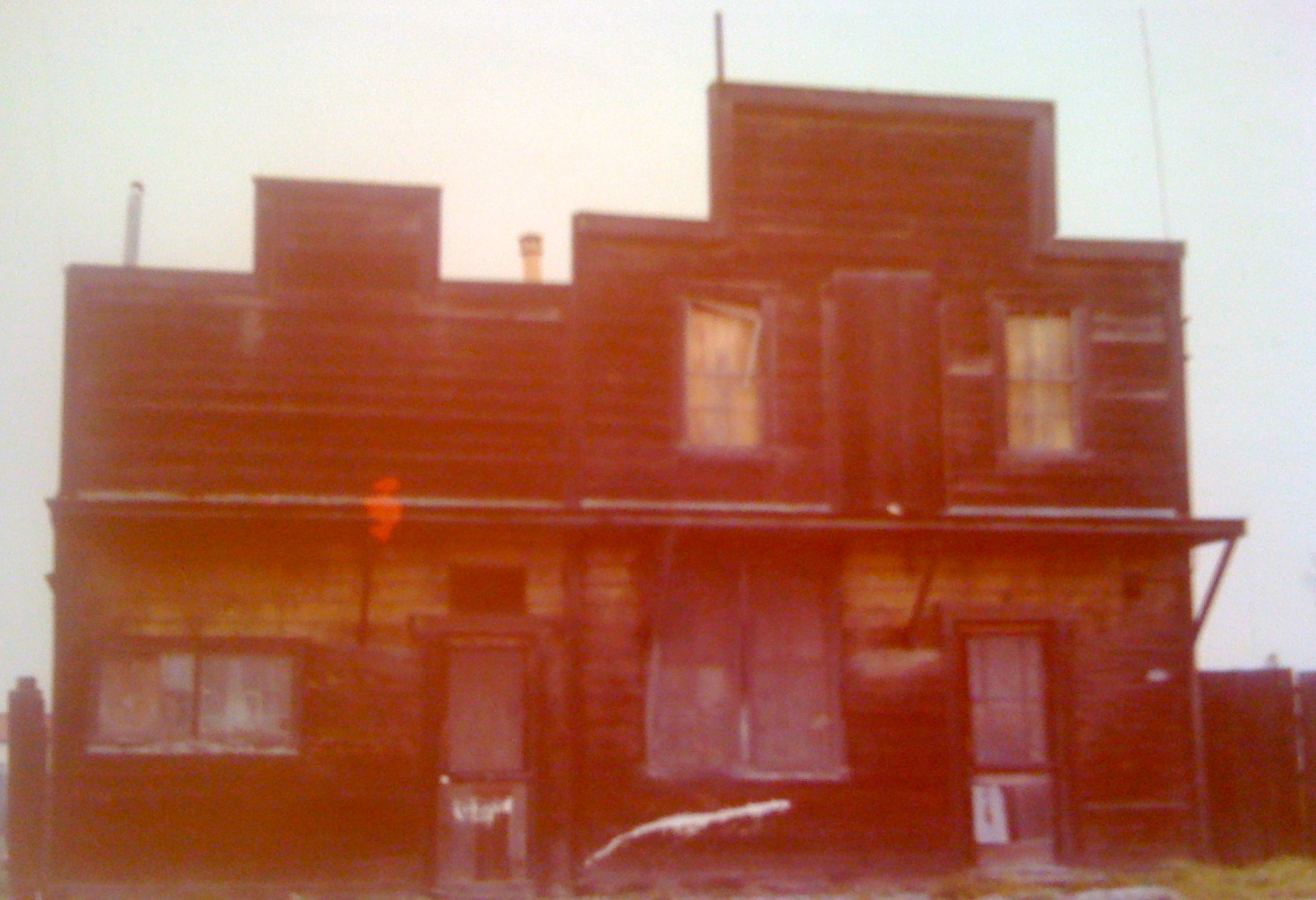
The Saloon, the last standing building in Chinatown

"In 1860 the Chinese contractors had established a presence here in Castroville. They were instrumental in clearing the slough, wetlands, and marshes especially in the northern section of the Rancho Bolsa Nueva y Moro Cojo. The land was ready to grow crops. In 1878 Manteufel moved the Chinese businesses that were on Merritt Street to the corner of McDougall and Speegle Street. In 1883 a fire destroyed the entire Chinatown. Chinatown was rebuilt and once again filled the sections of McDougall between Sanchez St. and Speegle St."

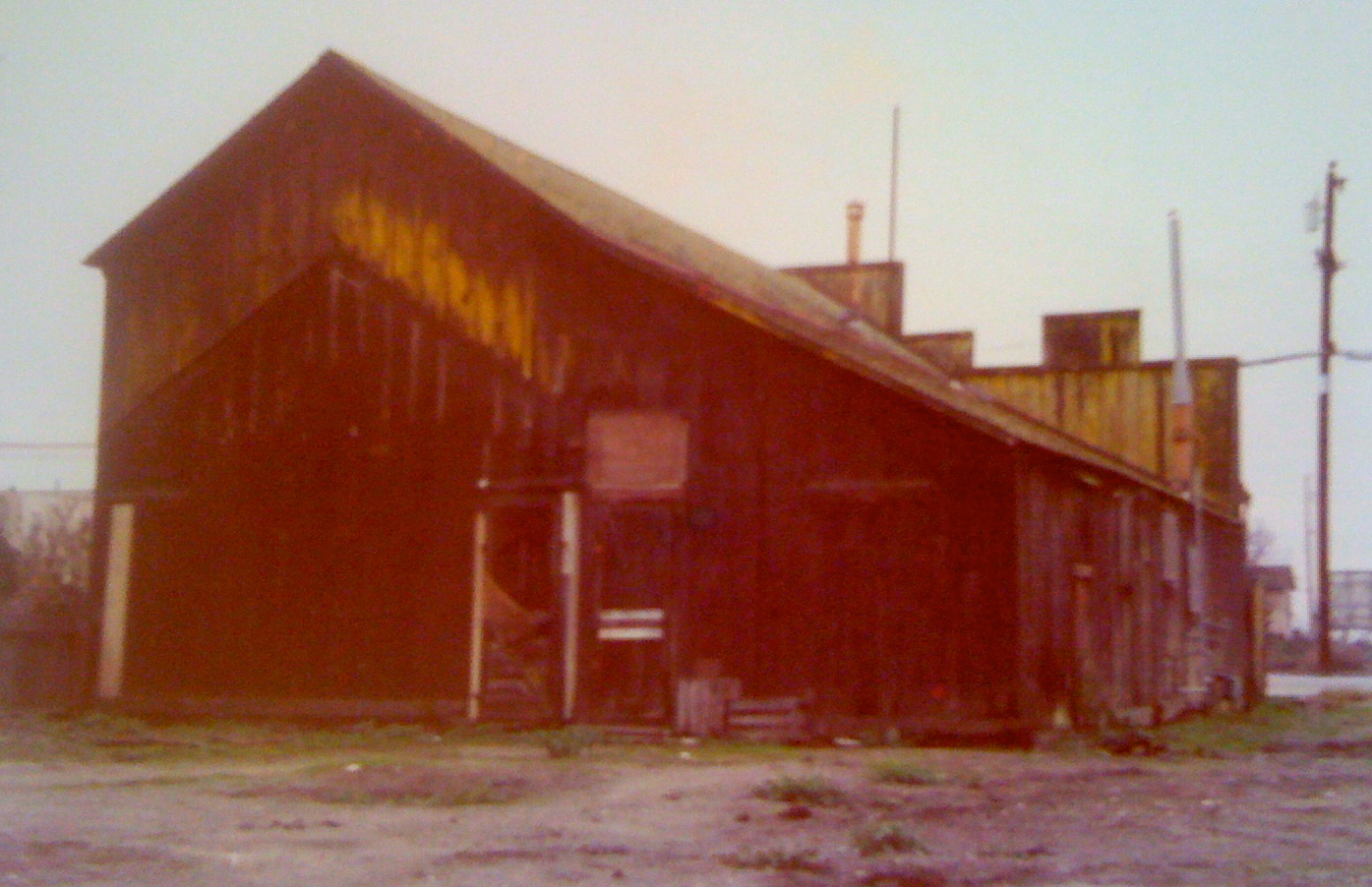
The Saloon, Rear View

"The new gold rush, applying to agriculture was termed, "Sugar Beet Rush." With additional farms and more people, local businesses were successful. The Monterey County Assessor listed fifteen Chinese companies farming sugar beets in the area of Castroville. The sugar beets farms continued to multiply and grow towards Salinas. The Chinese population in Castroville continue to grow as well. In 1891 Sam Kee and Jim Lee purchased a lot in Castroville. The "Quong Chung Company" purchased another lot. "This was the first time any Chinese had purchased property in the Monterey Bay Area."

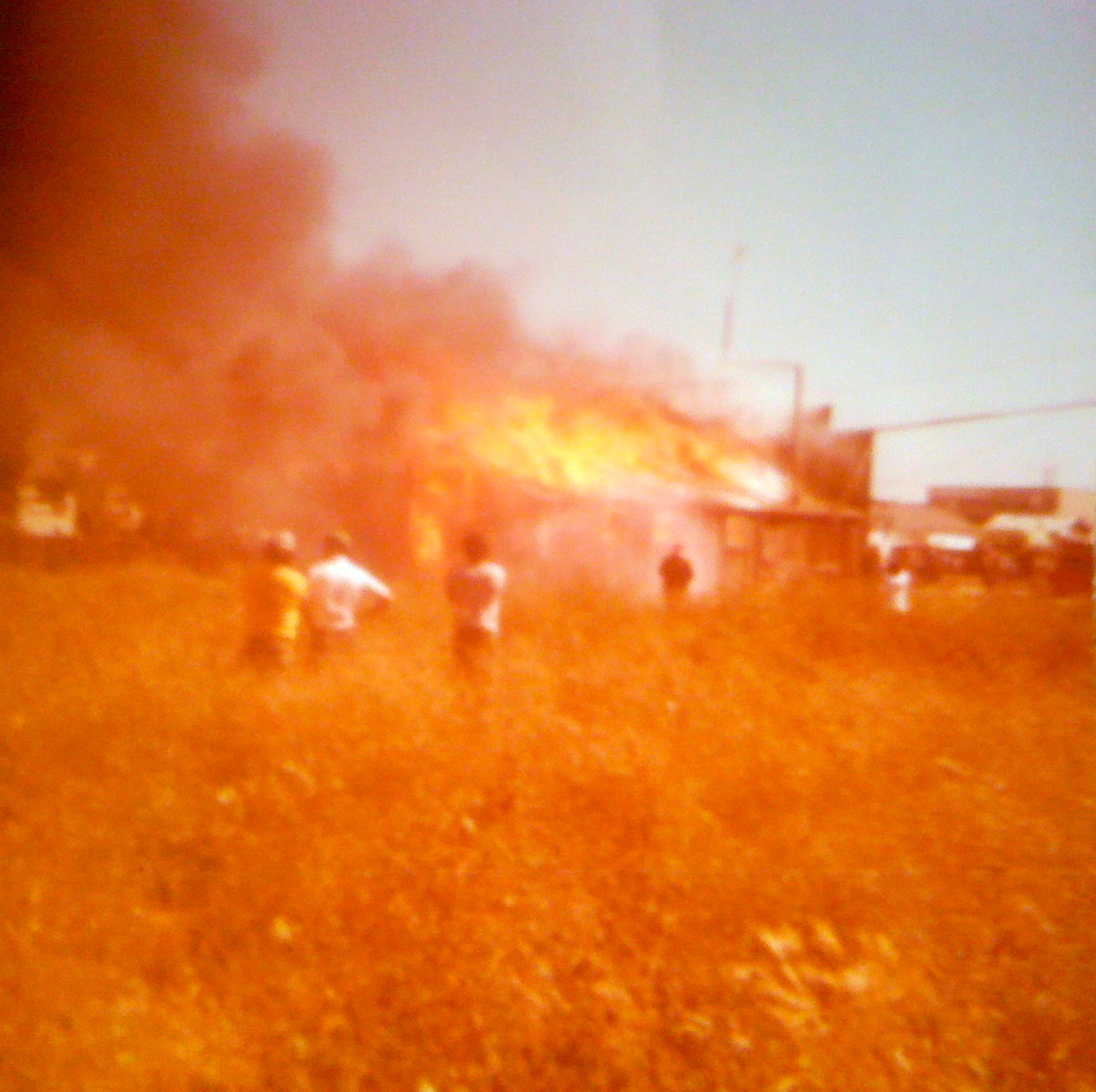
Saloon on Fire

In 1893 Salinas's Chinatown was destroyed. Many Chinese contractors and business owners moved to Castroville. When Watsonville's Chinatown burned down, the contractors also moved to Castroville. The California Alien Land Law of 1913 was passed. It prohibited aliens ineligible for citizenship from owning agricultural land or possessing long-term leases over it. It affected the Chinese, Indian, Japanese, and Korean immigrant farmers in California.

The new law was meant to discourage immigration. It created an inhospitable environment among contractors working here in the Monterey Bay Area. Letters from the editorial section had cartoons of anti-Chinese sentiment. A small group of business owners proposed an economic boycott of all businesses that employed Chinese directly or indirectly. Castroville's farmers/landowners would not be intimidated. They would not be pressured to act un-American. The Chinese contractors made many contributions to the area, especially in the agriculture, railroad, and fishing industry. Without the Chinese contractors the agricultural industry would be in ruin. The Chinese contractors began to leave the Monterey Bay Area. Some moved to San Francisco's Chinatown."

=== First artichoke ===
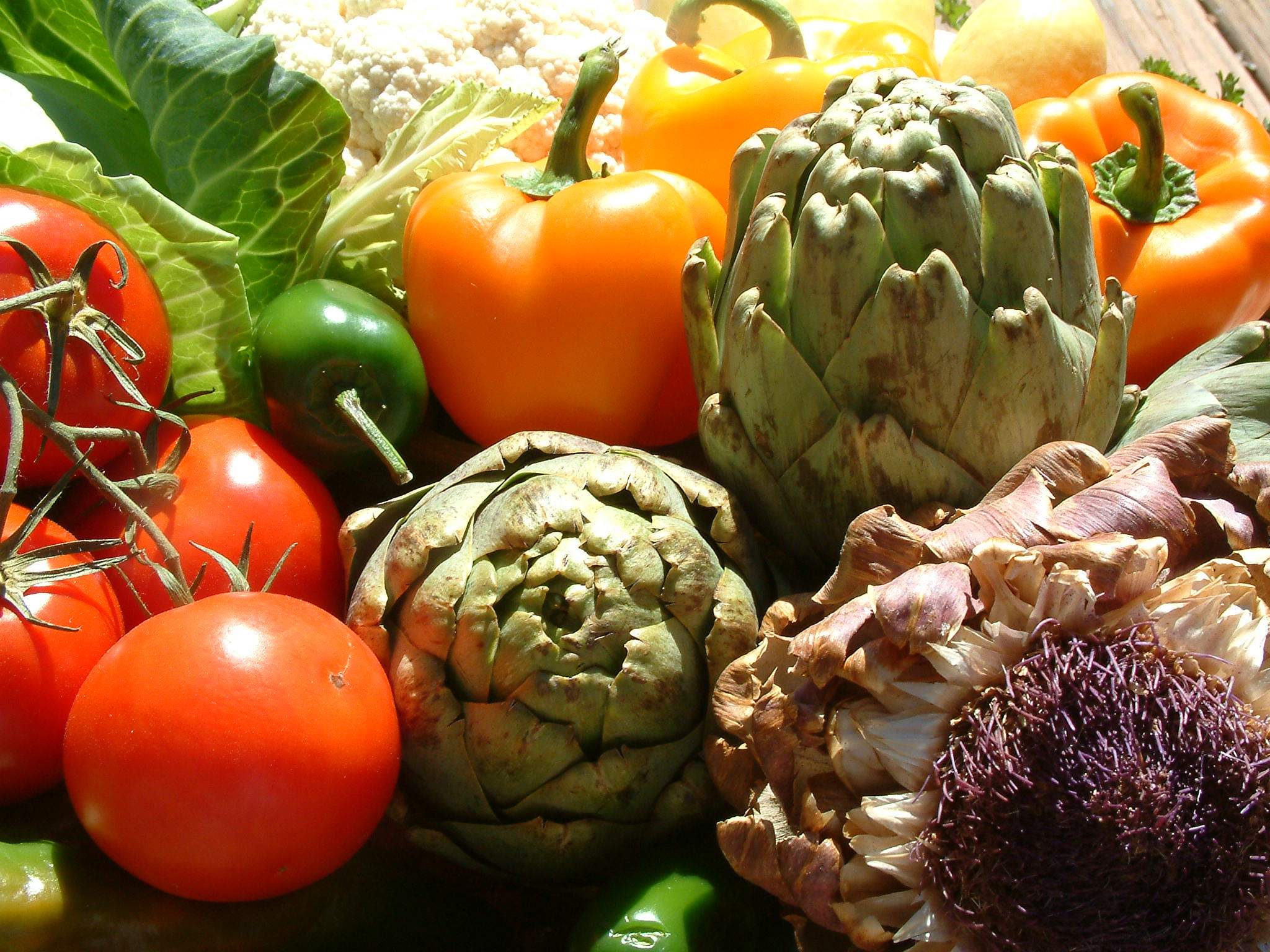
Artichokes and vegetables

It was the Spanish settlers who brought the artichoke to California. Some artichoke plants were in the gardens of European immigrants. California's first artichoke fields grew south of San Francisco, near the town of Half Moon Bay, in the early 1920s. In 1922, Andrew Molera planted the first artichoke shoots in Castroville. Angelo Del Chiaro, Egidio Maracci, Daniel Pieri, and Amerigo Del Chiaro subsequently leased 150 acres (61 ha) of land and grew artichokes.

In 1923, there were nine artichoke growers. Within four years, there were over 50 growers and 12,000 acres (4,900 ha) of artichokes growing in Castroville and the Monterey Bay area. In 1924 Daniel Pieri, Amerigo Del Chiaro, Angelo Del Chiaro, Alfred Tottino, and James Bellone formed the California Artichoke and Vegetable Growers Corporation. In 1995, they renamed the company "Ocean Mist Farms". Giant Artichoke, a large statue of an artichoke, was erected near a restaurant of the same name in 1963. It is the largest artichoke statue in the world.

=== First Artichoke Queen ===
Castroville's first Artichoke Queen was Sally DeSante Hebert (1941–2004) crowned in 1961. She was born in Carmel and grew up in Castroville. She moved to Salinas, graduated from Salinas High School, and Hartnell College. She worked for Monterey County in the Planning Department, and was involved in the Junior League, Buena Vista Garden Club, American Cancer Society, and other civic-minded organizations.

=== Marilyn Monroe, Honorary Artichoke Queen ===
Stanley Seedman, owner of Carlyle's Jewelers in Salinas, California, made arrangements for a model named Doreen Nash to model for a big promotional sale in Salinas in February 1948. Doreen Nash was not able to attend; her replacement was Marilyn Monroe.

Monroe spent a week in the Monterey Bay area, visiting and promoting her career. She replaced Doreen Nash at Carlyle's Jewelry and signed autographs. Monroe was asked to draw the lucky ticket for a $250 diamond ring in the Vogue Theater. During her stay, Marilyn Monroe visited several men's civic clubs including the Kiwanis Club. During the Kiwanis Club meeting, representatives from CalChoke (the California Artichoke Association) presented her with a sash as "California Artichoke Queen". She posed with Edward Modena, Randy Barsotti, and Enrico Bellone, each holding artichokes.

The photographs of Marilyn wearing the sash and holding artichokes were used in advertisements and passed throughout the produce industry.

=== New sign ===
On July 10, 2025, the "Castroville, Artichoke Center of the World" sign was replaced with a new one. The most major difference is the replacement of the "O" in "CASTROVILLE" with an artichoke. The metallic supports will feature at least four artichoke designs.

The old sign had been in place since the 1930s.

== Local government ==
The Castroville Water District was founded in 1952 to replace private wells. The Castroville Community Service Area (providing storm sewer, sanitation sewers, street maintenance and recreational services) was created in 1962. The two entities merged in 2008. At the time of the merger, the Castroville CSA included North Monterey County High School and Moro Cojo, a subdivision in Prunedale which receives separate water service.

== Geography ==
Castroville is located in northern Monterey County at coordinates 36°45′57″N 121°45′29″W. It is 8 miles (13 km) northwest of Salinas, the Monterey county seat; 16 miles (26 km) northeast of Monterey; and 28 miles (45 km) southeast of Santa Cruz. Prunedale, along U.S. Route 101, is 5 miles (8 km) to the east.

Elkhorn Slough National Estuarine Research Reserve, established in 1983, is 5 miles (8 km) north of Castroville, while Moro Cojo Slough State Marine Reserve, established in 2007, is directly south of Elkhorn Slough, about 2 miles (3 km) north of Castroville. Salinas River National Wildlife Refuge, established in 1974, is 4 miles (6 km) southwest of Castroville, where the Salinas River empties into Monterey Bay.

According to the U.S. Census Bureau, the Castroville CDP has an area of 1.0 square mile (2.6 km^{2}), all land. Tembladero Slough forms the southwest edge of the community.

=== Climate ===
Based on Köppen climate classification, Castroville has a cool-summer Mediterranean climate (Csb) and several microclimates, resulting in mild winters and cool summers. The warmest month is September with an average high of 63.1 F and an average low of 56.0 F. The coolest month is January with an average high of 58.6 F and an average low of 42.6 F.

There is no official wet season or dry season. Precipitation is dispersed throughout the year with most of it coming from various types of fog. One variation of is San Francisco fog (also known as advection fog) which mainly occurs along the Central Coast, from San Francisco to Santa Barbara.

== Demographics ==
Historical population
Census	Pop.	Note	%±
1950	1,865		—
1960	2,838		52.2%
1970	3,235		14.0%
1980	4,396		35.9%
1990	5,272		19.9%
2000	6,724		27.5%
2010	6,481		−3.6%
2020	7,515		16.0%
U.S. Decennial Census; 1850–1870 1880–1890; 1900 1910 1920; 1930 1940 1950; 1960 1970 1980; 1990 2000 2010

=== 2020 census ===
As of the 2020 census, Castroville had a population of 7,515 and a population density of 7,353.2 inhabitants per square mile (2,839.1/km^{2}).

Racial composition as of the 2020 census
Race	Number	Percent
White	1,345	17.9%
Black or African American	53	0.7%
American Indian and Alaska Native	282	3.8%
Asian	173	2.3%
Native Hawaiian and Other Pacific Islander	8	0.1%
Some other race	4,326	57.6%
Two or more races	1,328	17.7%
Hispanic or Latino (of any race)	6,872	91.4%

The census reported that 99.6% of the population lived in households, 0.4% lived in non-institutionalized group quarters, and no one was institutionalized.

100.0% of residents lived in urban areas, while 0.0% lived in rural areas.

There were 1,681 households, out of which 60.1% had children under the age of 18, 55.6% were married-couple households, 10.2% were cohabiting couple households, 22.4% had a female householder with no spouse or partner present, and 11.7% had a male householder with no spouse or partner present. 8.8% of households were made up of individuals, and 2.6% had someone living alone who was 65 years of age or older. The average household size was 4.45. There were 1,459 families (86.8% of all households).

The age distribution was 33.7% under the age of 18, 11.2% aged 18 to 24, 28.5% aged 25 to 44, 18.7% aged 45 to 64, and 7.9% who were 65 years of age or older. The median age was 28.2 years. For every 100 females, there were 100.9 males, and for every 100 females age 18 and over there were 97.6 males age 18 and over.

There were 1,732 housing units at an average density of 1,694.7 units per square mile (654.3 units/km^{2}), of which 1,681 (97.1%) were occupied. Of occupied units, 38.6% were owner-occupied and 61.4% were occupied by renters. 2.9% of housing units were vacant. The homeowner vacancy rate was 1.1%, and the rental vacancy rate was 1.6%.

=== Income and poverty ===
In 2023, the US Census Bureau estimated that the median household income was $90,486, and the per capita income was $20,260. About 13.4% of families and 14.6% of the population were below the poverty line.

=== 2010 census ===
The 2010 United States census reported that Castroville had a population of 6,481. The population density was 6,133.7 inhabitants per square mile (2,368.2/km^{2}).

The racial makeup of Castroville was 5,841 Hispanic or Latino of any race (90.1%), 2,807 (43.3%) White, 96 (1.5%) African American, 96 (1.5%) Native American, 169 (2.6%) Asian, 9 (0.1%) Pacific Islander, 2,955 (45.6%) from other races, and 349 (5.4%) from two or more races. The Census reported that 6,467 people (99.8% of the population) lived in households, 14 (0.2%) lived in non-institutionalized group quarters, and 0 (0%) were institutionalized.

There were 1,470 households, out of which 931 (63.3%) had children under the age of 18 living in them, 866 (58.9%) were opposite-sex married couples living together, 273 (18.6%) had a female householder with no husband present, 161 (11.0%) had a male householder with no wife present. There were 140 (9.5%) unmarried opposite-sex partnerships, and 11 (0.7%) same-sex married couples or partnerships. 124 households (8.4%) were made up of individuals, and 39 (2.7%) had someone living alone who was 65 years of age or older. The average household size was 4.40. There were 1,300 families (88.4% of all households); the average family size was 4.44.

The population was spread out, with 2,169 people (33.5%) under the age of 18, 888 people (13.7%) aged 18 to 24, 1,876 people (28.9%) aged 25 to 44, 1,132 people (17.5%) aged 45 to 64, and 416 people (6.4%) who were 65 years of age or older. The median age was 26.7 years. For every 100 females, there were 105.8 males. For every 100 females age 18 and over, there were 105.2 males.

There were 1,539 housing units at an average density of 1,456.5 units per square mile (562.4 units/km^{2}), of which 601 (40.9%) were owner-occupied, and 869 (59.1%) were occupied by renters. The homeowner vacancy rate was 2.4%; the rental vacancy rate was 2.0%. 2,626 people (40.5% of the population) lived in owner-occupied housing units and 3,841 people (59.3%) lived in rental housing units.

== Transportation ==
=== Highway access ===
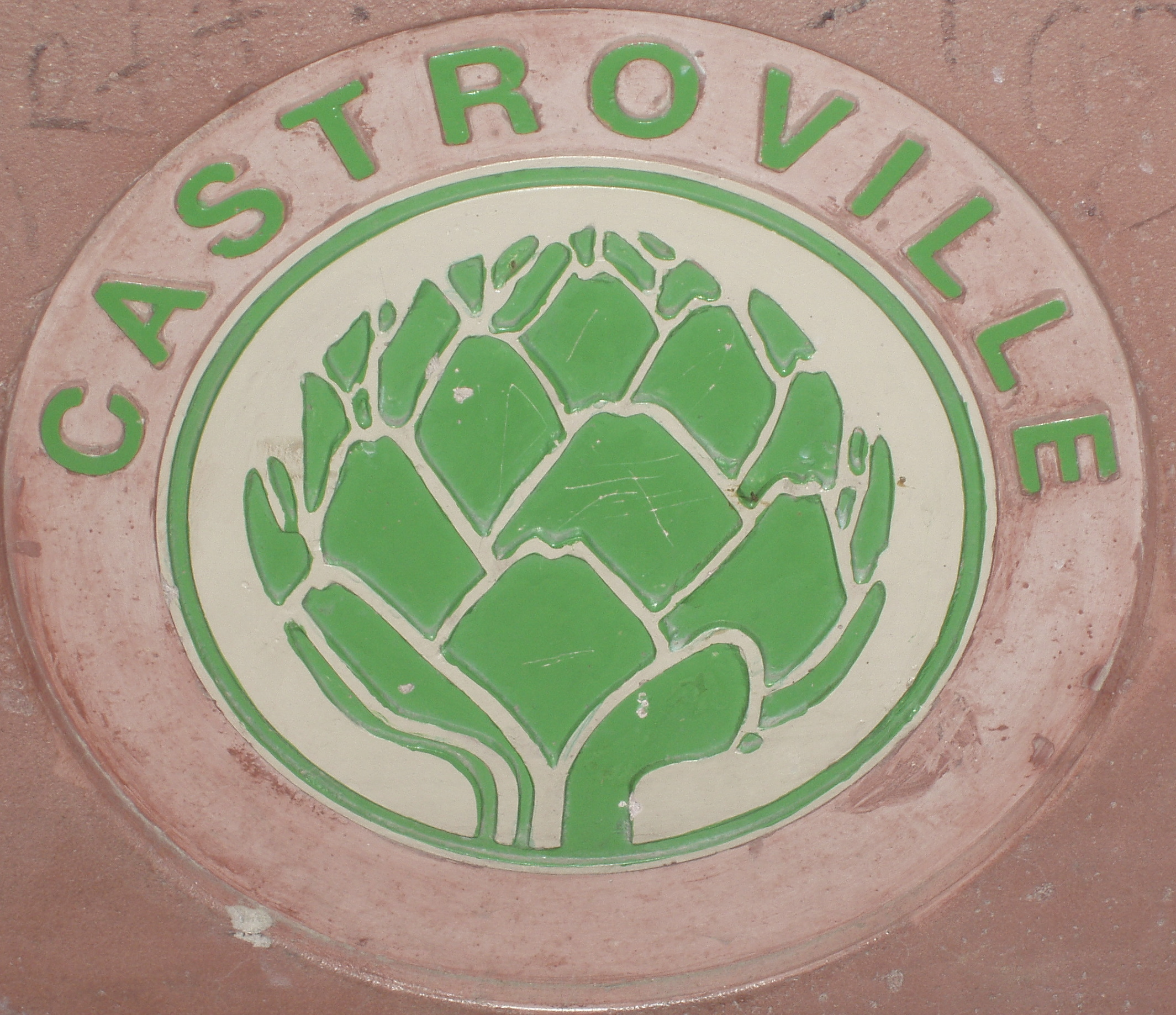
Bus stop city seal

California Highways 1, 156, and 183 intersect in Castroville. Highway 156 connects to the 101. Highway 1 provides access from Monterey and Santa Cruz. Highway 183 connects Castroville to Salinas.

Merritt Street serves as Castroville's main street. Most of Castroville's commerce is located in the industrial park on Blackie Road. Many public roads, low-income housing projects, and other publicly owned facilities have been funded by the Castroville Redevelopment Agency that was established by then-Monterey County Supervisor Marc Del Piero in the mid-1980s.

=== Rail ===
A train station may be planned to be built in Castroville as part of the Salinas Commuter Rail Extension Project, which would extend Caltrain service southward from Gilroy to Salinas. In the long term, Amtrak's Capitol Corridor trains may be extended to Salinas as well.

== Notable people ==
- Jamie Iredell, writer

== See also ==
- Castroville Artichoke Festival
- List of tourist attractions in Monterey County, California
