= List of national parks of the United States =

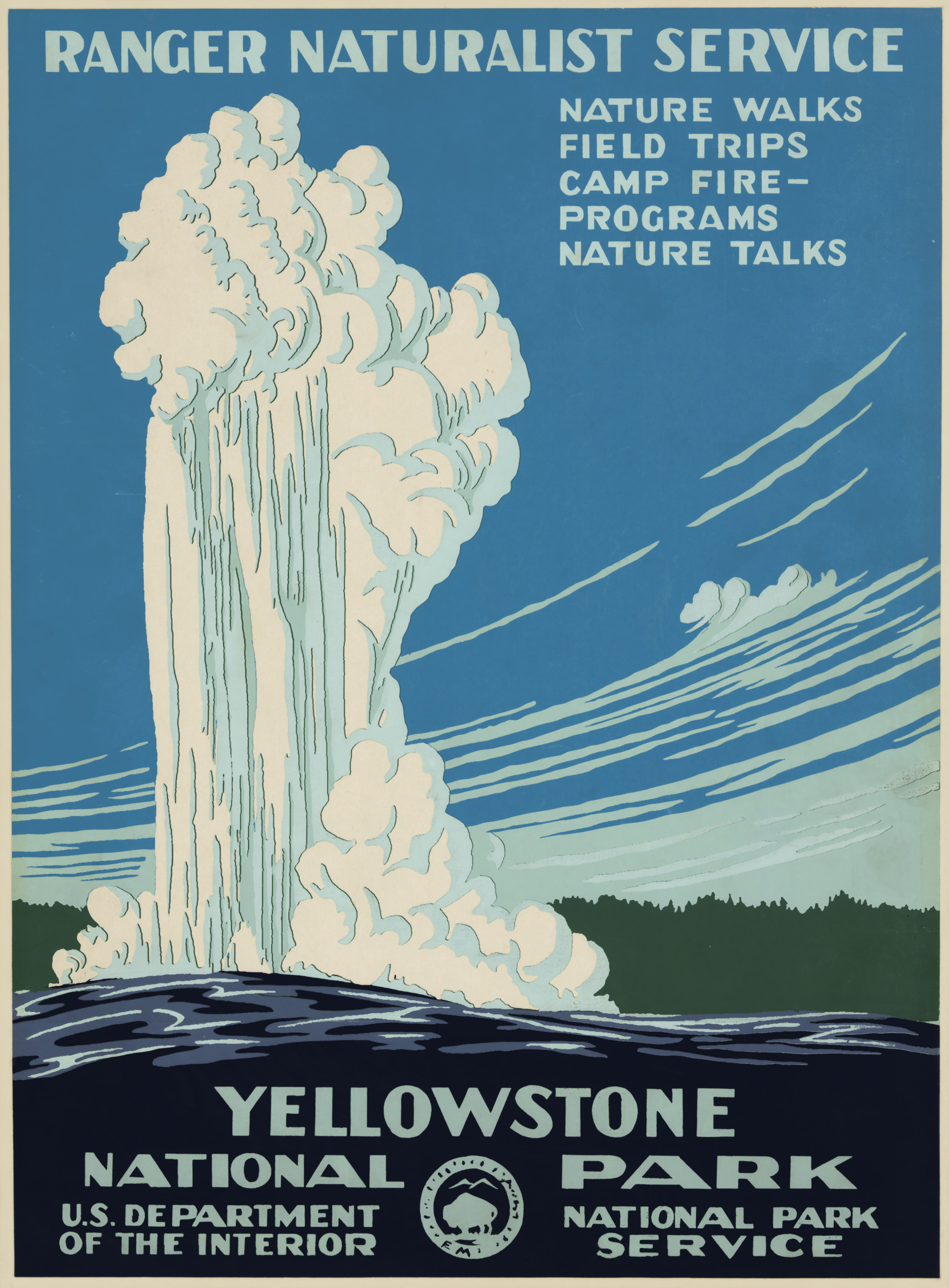
1938 poster promoting Yellowstone National Park, the first national park in the world

Interactive map of the national parks

The United States has 64 national parks, which are congressionally designated protected areas operated by the National Park Service, an agency of the Department of the Interior. National parks are designated for their natural beauty, unique geological features, diverse ecosystems, and recreational opportunities, typically "because of some outstanding scenic feature or natural phenomena." While legislatively all units of the National Park System are considered equal with the same mission, national parks are generally larger and more of a destination, and hunting and extractive activities are prohibited. National monuments, on the other hand, are also frequently protected for their historical or archaeological significance. Eight national parks (including six in Alaska) are paired with a national preserve, areas with different levels of protection that are administered together but considered separate units and whose areas are not included in the figures below. The 434 units of the National Park System can be broadly referred to as national parks, but most have other formal designations.

A bill creating the first national park, Yellowstone, was signed into law by President Ulysses S. Grant in 1872, followed by Mackinac National Park in 1875 (decommissioned in 1895), and then Rock Creek Park (later merged into National Capital Parks), Sequoia and Yosemite in 1890. The Organic Act of 1916 created the National Park Service "to conserve the scenery and the natural and historic objects and wildlife therein, and to provide for the enjoyment of the same in such manner and by such means as will leave them unimpaired for the enjoyment of future generations." Many current national parks had been previously protected as national monuments by the president under the Antiquities Act or as other designations created by Congress before being redesignated by Congress; the newest national park is Chiricahua, previously a National Monument, and the most recent entirely new park is National Park of American Samoa. A few former national parks are no longer designated as such, or have been disbanded. Fourteen national parks are designated UNESCO World Heritage Sites (WHS), and 21 national parks are named UNESCO Biosphere Reserves (BR), with eight national parks in both programs.

Thirty states have national parks, as do the territories of American Samoa and the U.S. Virgin Islands. The state with the most national parks is California with nine, followed by Alaska with eight, and Utah with five. The largest national park is Wrangell–St. Elias in Alaska: at over 8.3 million acres (33,600 km^{2}), it is larger than each of the nine smallest states. The next three largest parks are also in Alaska. The smallest park is Gateway Arch National Park, Missouri, at 91 acres (37 ha). The total area protected by national parks is approximately 52.4 million acres (212,000 km^{2}), for an average of 833 thousand acres (3,370 km^{2}) but a median of only 220 thousand acres (890 km^{2}).

The national parks set a visitation record in 2024, with more than 94 million visitors; although overall visitation at the national parks in 2025 dropped by about 400,000. Great Smoky Mountains National Park in North Carolina and Tennessee has been the most-visited park since 1944, and had over 12 million visitors in 2024. In contrast, about 11,900 people visited the remote Gates of the Arctic National Park and Preserve in Alaska that same year.

== National parks ==
Legend
* Green – UNESCO designated World Heritage Sites (WHS)
† Blue – UNESCO designated Biosphere Reserves (BR)
‡ Purple – parks designated in both UNESCO programs

List of national parks of the United States
Name	Image	Location	Date established as park	Area (2023)	Recreation visitors (2025)	Description
Acadia	A white lighthouse	Maine; 44.35°N 68.21°W	February 26, 1919	49,071.40 acres (198.6 km^{2})	4,079,318	Covering most of Mount Desert Island and other coastal islands, Acadia features the tallest mountain on the Atlantic coast of the United States, granite peaks, ocean shoreline, woodlands, and lakes. There are freshwater, estuary, forest, and intertidal habitats.
American Samoa	A white sand beach and verdant peaks	American Samoa; 14.25°S 170.68°W	October 31, 1988	8,256.67 acres (33.4 km^{2})	43,258	The southernmost national park is on three Samoan islands in the South Pacific. It protects coral reefs, rainforests, volcanic mountains, and white beaches. The area is also home to flying foxes, brown boobies, sea turtles, and 900 species of fish.
Arches	Delicate Arch, an iconic natural arch	Utah; 38.68°N 109.57°W	November 12, 1971	76,678.98 acres (310.3 km^{2})	1,511,740	This site features more than 2,000 natural sandstone arches, with some of the most popular arches in the park being Delicate Arch, Landscape Arch and Double Arch. Millions of years of erosion have created these structures in a desert climate where the arid ground has life-sustaining biological soil crusts and potholes that serve as natural water-collecting basins. Other geologic formations include stone pinnacles, fins, and balancing rocks.
Badlands		South Dakota; 43.75°N 102.50°W	November 10, 1978	242,755.94 acres (982.4 km^{2})	1,139,361	The Badlands are a collection of buttes, pinnacles, spires, and mixed-grass prairies within the drainage basin of the White River, in southwestern South Dakota. They contain the largest known assemblage of late Eocene and Oligocene mammal fossils. Wildlife includes bison, bighorn sheep, black-footed ferrets, and prairie dogs.
Big Bend †		Texas; 29.25°N 103.25°W	June 12, 1944	801,163.21 acres (3,242.2 km^{2})	568,104	Named for the prominent bend in the Rio Grande along the U.S.–Mexico border, this park encompasses a large and remote part of the Chihuahuan Desert. Its main attraction is backcountry recreation in the arid Chisos Mountains and in canyons along the river. A wide variety of Cretaceous and Tertiary fossils as well as cultural artifacts of Native Americans also exist within its borders. (BR)
Biscayne		Florida; 25.65°N 80.08°W	June 28, 1980	172,971.11 acres (700.0 km^{2})	486,567	The central part of Biscayne Bay, this mostly underwater park at the north end of the Florida Keys has four interrelated marine ecosystems: mangrove forest, the Bay, the Keys, and coral reefs. Threatened animals include the West Indian manatee, American crocodile, various sea turtles, and the peregrine falcon.
Black Canyon of the Gunnison		Colorado; 38.57°N 107.72°W	October 21, 1999	30,779.83 acres (124.6 km^{2})	250,086	The park protects a quarter of the Gunnison River, which slices sheer canyon walls from dark Precambrian-era rock. The canyon features some of the steepest cliffs and oldest rock in North America, and is a popular site for river rafting and rock climbing. The deep, narrow canyon is composed of gneiss and schist, which appears black when in shadow.
Bryce Canyon	Panorama view from Inspiration Point	Utah; 37.57°N 112.18°W	February 25, 1928	35,835.08 acres (145.0 km^{2})	1,967,367	Bryce Canyon is a geological amphitheater on southern Utah's Paunsaugunt Plateau with hundreds of tall, multicolored sandstone hoodoos formed by erosion. The region was originally settled by Native Americans and later by Mormon pioneers.
Canyonlands		Utah; 38.2°N 109.93°W	September 12, 1964	337,597.83 acres (1,366.2 km^{2})	796,057	This landscape was eroded into a maze of canyons, buttes, and mesas by the combined efforts of the Colorado River, Green River, and their tributaries, which divide the park into three districts. The park contains thousands of rock pinnacles and arches, as well as artifacts from Ancient Pueblo peoples.
Capitol Reef	Cassidy Arch at Capitol Reef	Utah; 38.20°N 111.17°W	December 18, 1971	241,904.50 acres (979.0 km^{2})	1,388,476	The park's Waterpocket Fold is a 100-mile (160 km) monocline that exhibits the earth's diverse geologic layers. Other natural features include monoliths, eroded buttes, and sandstone domes, including one shaped like the United States Capitol.
Carlsbad Caverns *		New Mexico; 32.17°N 104.44°W	May 14, 1930	46,766.45 acres (189.3 km^{2})	410,778	Carlsbad Caverns has 117 caves, the longest of which is over 120 miles (190 km) long. The Big Room is almost 4,000 feet (1,200 m) long, and the caves are home to over 400,000 Mexican free-tailed bats and sixteen other species. Above ground are the Chihuahuan Desert and Rattlesnake Springs. (WHS)
Channel Islands †		California; 34.01°N 119.42°W	March 5, 1980	249,561.00 acres (1,009.9 km^{2})	227,186	Five of the eight Channel Islands are protected, with half of the park's area underwater. The islands have a unique Mediterranean ecosystem originally settled by the Chumash people. They are home to over 2,000 species of land plants and animals, 145 endemic to them, including the island fox. Ferry services offer transportation to the islands from the mainland. (BR)
Chiricahua		Arizona 32.02°N 109.35°W	October 20, 2026	12,024.73 acres (48.7 km^{2})	70,406	These pillars of rhyolite tuff are the eroded remains of an immense volcanic eruption that shook the region some 27 million years ago. It was called the Land of the Standing-Up Rocks by the Apache.
Congaree †	Cyprus trees along a creek	South Carolina; 33.78°N 80.78°W	November 10, 2003	26,692.60 acres (108.0 km^{2})	287,833	On the Congaree River, this park is the largest portion of old-growth floodplain forest left in North America. Some of the trees are the tallest in the eastern United States. An elevated walkway called the Boardwalk Loop guides visitors through the swamp. (BR)
Crater Lake	Aerial view of Crater Lake	Oregon; 42.94°N 122.1°W	May 22, 1902	183,224.05 acres (741.5 km^{2})	632,242	Crater Lake lies in the caldera of an ancient volcano called Mount Mazama that collapsed 7,700 years ago. The lake is the deepest in the United States and is noted for its vivid blue color and water clarity. Wizard Island and the Phantom Ship are more recent volcanic formations within the caldera. As the lake has no inlets or outlets, it is replenished only by precipitation.
Cuyahoga Valley		Ohio; 41.24°N 81.55°W	October 11, 2000	32,571.89 acres (131.8 km^{2})	3,025,325	This park along the Cuyahoga River has waterfalls, hills, trails, and exhibits on early rural living. The Ohio and Erie Canal Towpath Trail follows the Ohio and Erie Canal, where mules towed canal boats. The park has numerous historic homes, bridges, and structures, and also offers a scenic train ride.
Death Valley †	Sand dunes and rocky peaks	California, Nevada; 36.24°N 116.82°W	October 31, 1994	3,408,395.63 acres (13,793.3 km^{2})	1,320,134	Death Valley is the hottest, lowest, and driest place in the United States, with daytime temperatures that have exceeded 130 °F (54 °C). The park protects Badwater Basin and its vast salt flats at the lowest elevation in North America, −282 ft (−86 m), This geologic graben also protects numerous canyons, badlands, sand dunes, mountain ranges, historic mines, springs, and more than 1,000 species of plants that grow. (BR)
Denali †	View of Denali from Wonder Lake	Alaska; 63.33°N 150.50°W	February 26, 1917	4,740,911.16 acres (19,185.8 km^{2})	543,300	Centered on Denali, the tallest and most prominent mountain in North America, the park is serviced by a single road leading to Wonder Lake, most of which can only be accessed via scheduled tour buses. Denali and other peaks of the Alaska Range are covered with long glaciers and boreal forest. Wildlife includes grizzly bears, Dall sheep, moose, caribou, and wolves. (BR)
Dry Tortugas †	Aerial view of Fort Jefferson	Florida; 24.63°N 82.87°W	October 26, 1992	64,701.22 acres (261.8 km^{2})	89,355	The islands of the Dry Tortugas, at the westernmost end of the Florida Keys, are the site of Fort Jefferson, a Civil War-era fort that is the largest masonry structure in the Americas. The park is home to undisturbed coral reefs and shipwrecks, and is only accessible by plane or boat. (BR)
Everglades ‡		Florida; 25.32°N 80.93°W	May 30, 1934	1,508,938.57 acres (6,106.5 km^{2})	778,198	The Everglades are the largest tropical wilderness in the United States. This mangrove and tropical rainforest ecosystem and marine estuary is home to 36 protected species, including the Florida panther, American crocodile, and West Indian manatee. Some areas have been drained and developed; restoration projects aim to restore the ecology. (WHS) (BR)
Gates of the Arctic	View of the winding Alatna River	Alaska; 67.78°N 153.30°W	December 2, 1980	7,523,897.45 acres (30,448.1 km^{2})	14,923	The country's northernmost park protects an expanse of pure wilderness in Alaska's Brooks Range and has no park facilities. The land is home to Alaska Natives who have relied on the land and caribou for 11,000 years.
Gateway Arch	Night view of St Louis and the Gateway Arch	Missouri; 38.63°N 90.19°W	February 22, 2018	91 acres (0.4 km^{2})	2,209,028	The Gateway Arch is a 630-foot (192 m) (both high and wide) catenary arch built in the 1960s to commemorate the Lewis and Clark Expedition, initiated by Thomas Jefferson, and the subsequent westward expansion of the country. The nearby Old Courthouse, across a greenway to the west of the arch, was the original site of the landmark Dred Scott case about slavery. An underground museum describes the arch's construction and the country's westward expansion.
Glacier ‡	Mountain Goat at Hidden Lake	Montana; 48.80°N 114.00°W	May 11, 1910	1,013,126.39 acres (4,100.0 km^{2})	3,136,557	The U.S. half of Waterton-Glacier International Peace Park, this park includes 26 rapidly receding glaciers and 130 named lakes surrounded by Rocky Mountain peaks. Historic hotels and the landmark Going-to-the-Sun Road accommodate visitors. The local mountains, formed by an overthrust, expose Paleozoic fossils including trilobites, mollusks, giant ferns and dinosaurs. The park is also home to Triple Divide Peak, which forms the boundary between the watersheds of the Atlantic, Pacific, and Arctic Oceans. (WHS) (BR)
Glacier Bay ‡		Alaska; 58.50°N 137.00°W	December 2, 1980	3,223,383.43 acres (13,044.6 km^{2})	740,044	Glacier Bay contains tidewater glaciers, mountains, fjords, and a temperate rainforest, and is home to large populations of grizzly bears, mountain goats, whales, seals, and eagles. When discovered in 1794 by George Vancouver, the entire bay was covered by ice, but the glaciers have since receded more than 65 miles (105 km). (WHS) (BR)
Grand Canyon *		Arizona; 36.06°N 112.14°W	February 26, 1919	1,201,647.03 acres (4,862.9 km^{2})	4,430,653	The Grand Canyon, carved by the mighty Colorado River, is 277 miles (446 km) long, up to 1 mile (1.6 km) deep, and up to 15 miles (24 km) wide. Millions of years of erosion have resulted in a massive three-tiered canyon, exposing the multicolored layers of the Colorado Plateau in mesas and canyon walls, visible from trails that descend into the canyon from the north and south rims. (WHS)
Grand Teton †	The "Cathedral Group" mountains	Wyoming; 43.73°N 110.80°W	February 26, 1929	310,044.36 acres (1,254.7 km^{2})	3,800,648	Grand Teton is the tallest mountain in the scenic Teton Range. The park's historic Jackson Hole and reflective piedmont lakes teem with endemic wildlife, with a backdrop of craggy mountains that rise abruptly from the sage-covered valley below. (BR)
Great Basin	Creek with fallen tree	Nevada; 38.98°N 114.30°W	October 27, 1986	77,180.00 acres (312.3 km^{2})	161,210	Based around Nevada's second tallest mountain, Wheeler Peak, Great Basin National Park protects 5,000-year-old bristlecone pines, a rock glacier, and the limestone Lehman Caves. Due to its remote location, the park is home to some of the country's darkest night skies. Wildlife includes the Townsend's big-eared bat, pronghorn, and Bonneville cutthroat trout.
Great Sand Dunes	Sunset shadows on sand dunes	Colorado; 37.73°N 105.51°W	September 24, 2004	107,345.73 acres (434.4 km^{2})	432,498	The tallest sand dunes in North America, up to 750 feet (230 m) tall, were formed by deposits of the ancient Rio Grande in the San Luis Valley. Abutting a variety of grasslands, shrublands, and wetlands, the park also features alpine lakes, six 13,000-foot mountains, and old-growth forests.
Great Smoky Mountains ‡	Fog at Great Smoky Mountains	North Carolina, Tennessee; 35.68°N 83.53°W	June 15, 1934	522,426.88 acres (2,114.2 km^{2})	11,527,939	The Great Smoky Mountains, part of the Appalachian Mountains, span a wide range of elevations, making them home to over 400 vertebrate species, 100 tree species, and 5,000 plant species. Hiking is the park's main attraction, with over 800 miles (1,300 km) of trails, including 70 miles (110 km) of the Appalachian Trail. Other activities include fishing, horseback riding, and touring nearly 80 historic structures. (WHS) (BR)
Guadalupe Mountains	El Capitan at Guadalupe National Park	Texas; 31.92°N 104.87°W	September 30, 1972	86,367.10 acres (349.5 km^{2})	206,423	This park contains Guadalupe Peak, the highest point in Texas, as well as the scenic McKittrick Canyon filled with bigtooth maples, a corner of the arid Chihuahuan Desert, and a fossilized coral reef from the Permian era.
Haleakalā †	Haleakalā crater	Hawaii; 20.72°N 156.17°W	July 1, 1961	33,488.98 acres (135.5 km^{2})	853,711	The Haleakalā volcano on Maui features a very large crater with numerous cinder cones, a grove of non-native trees, the Kipahulu section's scenic pools of freshwater fish, and the endemic Hawaiian goose. The park protects the greatest number of endangered species within a U.S. national park. (BR)
Hawaiʻi Volcanoes ‡	Sulfur at Halemaumau vent	Hawaii; 19.38°N 155.20°W	August 1, 1916	344,812.18 acres (1,395.4 km^{2})	1,877,854	This park on the Big Island protects the Kīlauea and Mauna Loa volcanoes, two of the world's most active geological features. Diverse ecosystems range from tropical forests at sea level to barren lava beds at more than 13,000 feet (4,000 m). (WHS) (BR)
Hot Springs		Arkansas; 34.51°N 93.05°W	March 4, 1921	5,554.15 acres (22.5 km^{2})	2,494,611	Hot Springs was originally established by Congress as a federal reserve on April 20, 1832, making it the oldest area managed by the National Park Service. Natural thermal springs flow out of the Ouachita Mountains, providing opportunities for relaxation in a historic setting. Bathhouse Row preserves examples of 19th-century architecture. Hot Springs is the first national park within a city and was the smallest national park until 2018.
Indiana Dunes		Indiana; 41.6533°N 87.0524°W	February 15, 2019	15,349.08 acres (62.1 km^{2})	2,629,497	Previously designated a national lakeshore, parts of this 20-mile (32 km) stretch of the southern shore of Lake Michigan have sandy beaches and tall dunes. The park includes grassy prairies, peat bogs, and marsh wetlands home to over 2,000 species.
Isle Royale †		Michigan; 48.10°N 88.55°W	April 3, 1940	571,790.30 acres (2,314.0 km^{2})	29,091	The largest island in Lake Superior is a place of isolation and wilderness. Along with its many shipwrecks, waterways, and hiking trails, the park also includes over 400 smaller islands within 4.5 miles (7.2 km) of its shores. There are only 20 mammal species on the island, though the relationship between its wolf and moose populations is especially unique. (BR)
Joshua Tree †	Joshua trees and a rock formation	California; 33.79°N 115.90°W	October 31, 1994	795,155.85 acres (3,217.9 km^{2})	2,932,644	Covering large areas of the Colorado and Mojave Deserts and the Little San Bernardino Mountains, this desert landscape is populated by vast stands of Joshua trees. Large changes in elevation reveal various contrasting environments including bleached sand dunes, dry lakes, rugged mountains, and maze-like clusters of monzogranite monoliths. (BR)
Katmai	Bears at Naknek Lake	Alaska; 58.50°N 155.00°W	December 2, 1980	3,674,529.33 acres (14,870.3 km^{2})	34,479	This park on the Alaska Peninsula protects the Valley of Ten Thousand Smokes, an ash flow formed by the 1912 eruption of Novarupta, and the stratovolcano Mount Katmai. Over 2,000 grizzly bears come here each year to catch spawning salmon. Other wildlife includes caribou, wolves, moose, and wolverines.
Kenai Fjords		Alaska; 59.92°N 149.65°W	December 2, 1980	669,650.05 acres (2,710.0 km^{2})	425,369	Near Seward on the Kenai Peninsula, this park protects the Harding Icefield and at least 38 glaciers and fjords stemming from it. The only area accessible to the public by road is the rapidly shrinking Exit Glacier. Boat and kayak tours offer views of tidewater glaciers, whales, sea lions, and marine birds.
Kings Canyon †	Copper Creek Trail at Kings Canyon	California; 36.80°N 118.55°W	March 4, 1940	461,901.20 acres (1,869.2 km^{2})	779,791	Home to several giant sequoia groves and the General Grant Tree, the world's second largest measured tree, this park also features part of the Kings River, sculptor of the dramatic granite canyon that is its namesake, and the San Joaquin River, as well as Boyden Cave. Although Kings Canyon National Park was designated as such in 1940, it subsumed General Grant National Park, which had been established on October 1, 1890, as the United States' fourth national park. (BR)
Kobuk Valley		Alaska; 67.55°N 159.28°W	December 2, 1980	1,750,716.16 acres (7,084.9 km^{2})	7,786	Kobuk Valley protects 61 miles (98 km) of the Kobuk River and three regions of sand dunes. Created by glaciers, the Great Kobuk, Little Kobuk, and Hunt River Sand Dunes can reach 100 feet (30 m) high and 100 °F (38 °C), and they are the largest dunes in the Arctic. Twice a year, half a million caribou migrate through the dunes and across river bluffs that expose well-preserved ice age fossils.
Lake Clark		Alaska; 60.97°N 153.42°W	December 2, 1980	2,619,816.49 acres (10,602.0 km^{2})	19,778	The region around Lake Clark features four active volcanoes, including Mount Redoubt, as well as an abundance of rivers, glaciers, and waterfalls. Temperate rainforests, a tundra plateau, and three mountain ranges complete the landscape.
Lassen Volcanic	Lake Helen with snow	California; 40.49°N 121.51°W	August 9, 1916	106,589.02 acres (431.4 km^{2})	504,777	Lassen Peak, the largest lava dome volcano in the world, is joined by all three other types of volcanoes in this park: shield, cinder cone, and composite. Though Lassen itself last erupted in 1917, most of the rest of the park is continuously active. Numerous hydrothermal features, including fumaroles, boiling pools, and bubbling mud pots, are heated by molten rock from beneath the peak.
Mammoth Cave ‡		Kentucky; 37.18°N 86.10°W	July 1, 1941	72,472.87 acres (293.3 km^{2})	660,734	With more than 400 miles (640 km) of passageways explored, Mammoth Cave is the world's longest known cave system. Subterranean wildlife includes eight bat species, Kentucky cave shrimp, Northern cavefish, and cave salamanders. Above ground, the park provides recreation on the Green River, 70 miles of hiking trails, and plenty of sinkholes and springs. (WHS) (BR)
Mesa Verde *	Cliff Palace at Mesa Verde	Colorado; 37.18°N 108.49°W	June 29, 1906	52,485.17 acres (212.4 km^{2})	463,130	This area constitutes over 4,000 archaeological sites of the Ancestral Puebloan people, who lived here and elsewhere in the Four Corners region for at least 700 years. Cliff dwellings built in the 12th and 13th centuries include Cliff Palace, which has 150 rooms and 23 kivas, and the Balcony House, with its many passages and tunnels. (WHS)
Mount Rainier		Washington; 46.85°N 121.75°W	March 2, 1899	236,381.64 acres (956.6 km^{2})	1,635,342	Mount Rainier, an active stratovolcano, is the most prominent peak in the Cascades and is covered by 26 named glaciers including Carbon Glacier and Emmons Glacier, the longest and largest in the contiguous United States respectively. The mountain is popular for climbing, and more than half of the park is covered by subalpine and alpine forests and meadows seasonally in bloom with wildflowers. Paradise on the south slope is among the snowiest places on Earth. The Longmire visitor center is the start of the Wonderland Trail, which encircles the mountain.
New River Gorge	New River Gorge Bridge	West Virginia; 38.07°N 81.08°W	December 27, 2020	7,021 acres (28.4 km^{2})	1,958,440	The New River Gorge is the deepest river gorge east of the Mississippi River. The park primarily covers the lower gorge area around the New River Gorge Bridge, which features some of the country's best whitewater rafting. Smaller noncontiguous sections showcase the ghost town of Thurmond, the scenic Grandview vista, and Sandstone Falls. The other 65,165 acres (263.71 km^{2}) of the redesignated national river is now a national preserve, spanning 53 miles (85 km) of the New River.
North Cascades	Cascade Pass	Washington; 48.70°N 121.20°W	October 2, 1968	504,780.94 acres (2,042.8 km^{2})	46,925	The highly glaciated mountains of the North Cascades Range exhibit a spectacular and complex geologic history. Between the river valleys and high peaks there are eight diverse life zones with 75 mammal and 1,600 vascular plant species. Popular hiking and climbing areas of the Stephen Mather Wilderness include Cascade Pass, Mount Shuksan, Mount Triumph, and Eldorado Peak. Ross Lake and Lake Chelan National Recreation Areas adjoin the two segments of the park and are all administered together.
Olympic ‡	Bigleaf maples in the Hoh Rainforest	Washington; 47.97°N 123.50°W	June 29, 1938	922,649.41 acres (3,733.8 km^{2})	3,584,187	This park on the Olympic Peninsula includes a wide range of ecosystems from Pacific shoreline to temperate rainforests to the glaciated alpine peaks of the Olympic Mountains, the tallest of which is Mount Olympus. The Hoh and Quinault Rainforests are the wettest areas in the contiguous United States, with the Hoh receiving an average of almost 12 ft (3.7 m) of rain every year. (WHS) (BR)
Petrified Forest	Cone-shaped rock formations	Arizona; 35.07°N 109.78°W	December 9, 1962	221,390.21 acres (895.9 km^{2})	315,951	This portion of the Chinle Formation has a large concentration of 225-million-year-old petrified wood. The surrounding Painted Desert features eroded cliffs of red-hued volcanic rock called bentonite. Dinosaur fossils and over 350 Native American sites are also protected in this park.
Pinnacles		California; 36.48°N 121.16°W	January 10, 2013	26,685.73 acres (108.0 km^{2})	343,208	Named for the eroded leftovers of a portion of an extinct volcano, the park's massive black and gold monoliths of andesite and rhyolite are a popular destination for rock climbers. Hikers have access to trails crossing the Coast Range wilderness. The park is one of the few locations where the endangered California condor can be seen in the wild. Pinnacles also supports a dense population of prairie falcons and more than 13 species of bat that populate its talus caves.
Redwood *	Foggy redwood grove	California; 41.30°N 124.00°W	October 2, 1968	138,999.37 acres (562.5 km^{2})	1,202,480	This park and the co-managed state parks protect almost half of all remaining coastal redwoods, the tallest trees on earth. There are three large river systems in this very seismically active area, and 37 miles (60 km) of protected coastline reveal tide pools and seastacks. The prairie, estuary, coast, river, and forest ecosystems contain a wide variety of animal and plant species. (WHS)
Rocky Mountain †	Bierstadt Lake and Rockies	Colorado; 40.40°N 105.58°W	January 26, 1915	265,847.74 acres (1,075.8 km^{2})	4,171,431	Bisected north to south by the Continental Divide, this portion of the Rockies has ecosystems varying from over 150 riparian lakes to montane and subalpine forests to treeless alpine tundra. Wildlife including elk, moose, mule deer, bighorn sheep, black bears, and cougars inhabit its igneous mountains and glacial valleys. Longs Peak, a classic Colorado fourteener, and the scenic Bear Lake are popular destinations, as well as the historic Trail Ridge Road, which reaches an elevation of more than 12,000 feet (3,700 m). (BR)
Saguaro		Arizona; 32.25°N 110.50°W	October 14, 1994	92,876.75 acres (375.9 km^{2})	847,749	Split into the separate Rincon Mountain and Tucson Mountain districts, this park is evidence that the dry Sonoran Desert is still home to a great variety of life spanning six biotic communities. Beyond the namesake giant saguaro cacti, there are barrel cacti, chollas, and prickly pears, as well as lesser long-nosed bats, spotted owls, and javelinas.
Sequoia †	Giant sequoia grove	California; 36.43°N 118.68°W	September 25, 1890	404,062.63 acres (1,635.2 km^{2})	1,378,337	This park protects the Giant Forest, which boasts some of the world's largest trees, the General Sherman being the largest measured tree in the park. Other features include over 240 caves, a long segment of the Sierra Nevada including the tallest mountain in the contiguous United States, and Moro Rock, a large granite dome. (BR)
Shenandoah	Dark Hollow Falls in Autumn	Virginia; 38.53°N 78.35°W	December 26, 1935	200,445.92 acres (811.2 km^{2})	1,682,152	Shenandoah's Blue Ridge Mountains are covered by hardwood forests that teem with a wide variety of wildlife. The Skyline Drive and Appalachian Trail run the entire length of this narrow park, along with more than 500 miles (800 km) of hiking trails passing scenic overlooks and cataracts of the Shenandoah River.
Theodore Roosevelt		North Dakota; 46.97°N 103.45°W	November 10, 1978	70,446.89 acres (285.1 km^{2})	729,893	This region that enticed and influenced President Theodore Roosevelt consists of a park of three units in the northern badlands. Besides Roosevelt's historic cabin, there are numerous scenic drives and backcountry hiking opportunities. Wildlife includes American bison, pronghorn, bighorn sheep, and wild horses.
Virgin Islands		U.S. Virgin Islands; 18.33°N 64.73°W	August 2, 1956	15,052.33 acres (60.9 km^{2})	471,074	This island park on Saint John preserves pristine beaches surrounded by mangrove forests, seagrass beds, and coral reefs. It also has Taíno archaeological sites and the ruins of sugar plantations from Columbus's time.
Voyageurs		Minnesota; 48.50°N 92.88°W	April 8, 1975	218,222.35 acres (883.1 km^{2})	206,326	This park protecting four lakes near the Canada–US border is a site for canoeing, kayaking, and fishing. The park also preserves a history populated by Ojibwe Native Americans, French fur traders called voyageurs, and gold miners. Formed by glaciers, the region features tall bluffs, rock gardens, islands, bays, and several historic buildings.
White Sands		New Mexico; 32.78°N 106.17°W	December 20, 2019	146,344.31 acres (592.2 km^{2})	659,742	Located in the mountain-ringed Tularosa Basin, White Sands consists of the southern part of a 275-square-mile (710 km^{2}) field of white sand dunes composed of gypsum crystals—the world's largest gypsum dunefield. The park is completely within the White Sands Missile Range and is subject to closure when tests are conducted.
Wind Cave		South Dakota; 43.57°N 103.48°W	January 9, 1903	33,970.84 acres (137.5 km^{2})	606,258	Wind Cave is distinctive for its calcite fin formations called boxwork, a unique formation rarely found elsewhere, and needle-like growths called frostwork. It is one of the longest caves in the world and creates a wind as air pressure changes. Above ground is a mixed-grass prairie with animals such as bison, black-footed ferrets, and prairie dogs and ponderosa pine forests home to cougars and elk. The cave is culturally significant to the Lakota people as a creation site.
Wrangell–St. Elias *		Alaska; 61.00°N 142.00°W	December 2, 1980	8,323,146.48 acres (33,682.6 km^{2})	108,840	The largest national park in the system protects the convergence of the Alaska, Chugach, Wrangell, and Saint Elias Ranges, which include many of the continent's tallest mountains and volcanoes, including the 18,008-foot Mount Saint Elias. More than a quarter of the park is covered with glaciers, including the tidewater Hubbard Glacier, piedmont Malaspina Glacier, and valley Nabesna Glacier. (WHS)
Yellowstone ‡	Steam rises from a rainbow hot spring	Wyoming, Montana, Idaho; 44.60°N 110.50°W	March 1, 1872	2,219,790.71 acres (8,983.2 km^{2})	4,762,988	Situated on the Yellowstone Caldera, the park has an expansive network of geothermal areas including boiling mud pots, vividly colored hot springs such as Grand Prismatic Spring, and regularly erupting geysers, the best-known being Old Faithful. The yellow-hued Grand Canyon of the Yellowstone River contains several high waterfalls, and four mountain ranges traverse the park. More than 60 mammal species including timber wolves, grizzly bears, black bears, lynxes, bison, and elk make this park one of the best wildlife viewing spots in the country. (WHS) (BR)
Yosemite *	Half Dome view from Glacier Point	California; 37.83°N 119.50°W	October 1, 1890	761,747.50 acres (3,082.7 km^{2})	4,278,413	Yosemite features sheer granite cliffs, exceptionally tall waterfalls, and old-growth forests at a unique intersection of geology and hydrology. Half Dome and El Capitan rise from the park's centerpiece, the glacier-carved Yosemite Valley, and from its vertical walls drop Yosemite Falls, one of North America's tallest waterfalls at 2,425 feet (739 m) high. Three giant sequoia groves, along with a pristine wilderness in the heart of the Sierra Nevada, are home to a wide variety of rare plant and animal species. (WHS)
Zion		Utah; 37.30°N 113.05°W	November 19, 1919	147,242.66 acres (595.9 km^{2})	4,984,525	Located at the junction of the Colorado Plateau, Great Basin, and Mojave Desert, this park contains sandstone features such as mesas, rock towers, and canyons, including the Virgin River Narrows. The various sandstone formations and the forks of the Virgin River create a wilderness divided into four ecosystems: desert, riparian, woodland, and coniferous forest.

=== Parks by state or territory ===
The following table includes the 30 states and two territories that have national parks. Exclusive parks refer to parks entirely within one state or territory. Shared parks refer to parks in multiple states.

Territories are set in italics.

States and Territories Containing National Parks
State	Total parks	Exclusive parks	Shared parks
California	9	8	1
Alaska	8	8	—
Utah	5	5	—
Colorado	4	4	—
Arizona	4	4	—
Florida	3	3	—
Washington	3	3	—
Hawaii	2	2	—
New Mexico	2	2	—
South Dakota	2	2	—
Texas	2	2	—
Montana	2	1	1
Nevada	2	1	1
Wyoming	2	1	1
American Samoa	1	1	—
Arkansas	1	1	—
Indiana	1	1	—
Kentucky	1	1	—
Maine	1	1	—
Michigan	1	1	—
Minnesota	1	1	—
Missouri	1	1	—
North Dakota	1	1	—
Ohio	1	1	—
Oregon	1	1	—
South Carolina	1	1	—
U.S. Virgin Islands	1	1	—
Virginia	1	1	—
West Virginia	1	1	—
Idaho	1	—	1
North Carolina	1	—	1
Tennessee	1	—	1

== See also ==
- History of the National Park Service
- List of areas in the United States National Park System
- List of national monuments of the United States
- List of National Wildlife Refuges of the United States
- List of the United States National Park System official units
- List of national forests of the United States
- List of World Heritage Sites in the United States
- Lists of state parks by U.S. state
