= Double Arch =

Double Arch may refer to:

- Double Arch (Kentucky), a pair of natural arches in Daniel Boone National Forest, Kentucky, United States.
- Double Arch (Utah), a famous close-set pair of natural arches in Arches National Park, Utah, United States.
- Double Arch, also known as the "Toilet Bowl", "Crescent Pool", and "Hole in the Roof", a natural stone formation in Glen Canyon National Recreation Area, Utah, United States, which collapsed due to erosion on August 8, 2024.
- Double aortic arch, a relatively rare congenital cardiovascular malformation
- Double arch bridge, a bridge with abutments at each end and in the middle shaped as two curved arches
