= Pinnacles National Park =

National park in California, United States

- IUCN category II (national park)
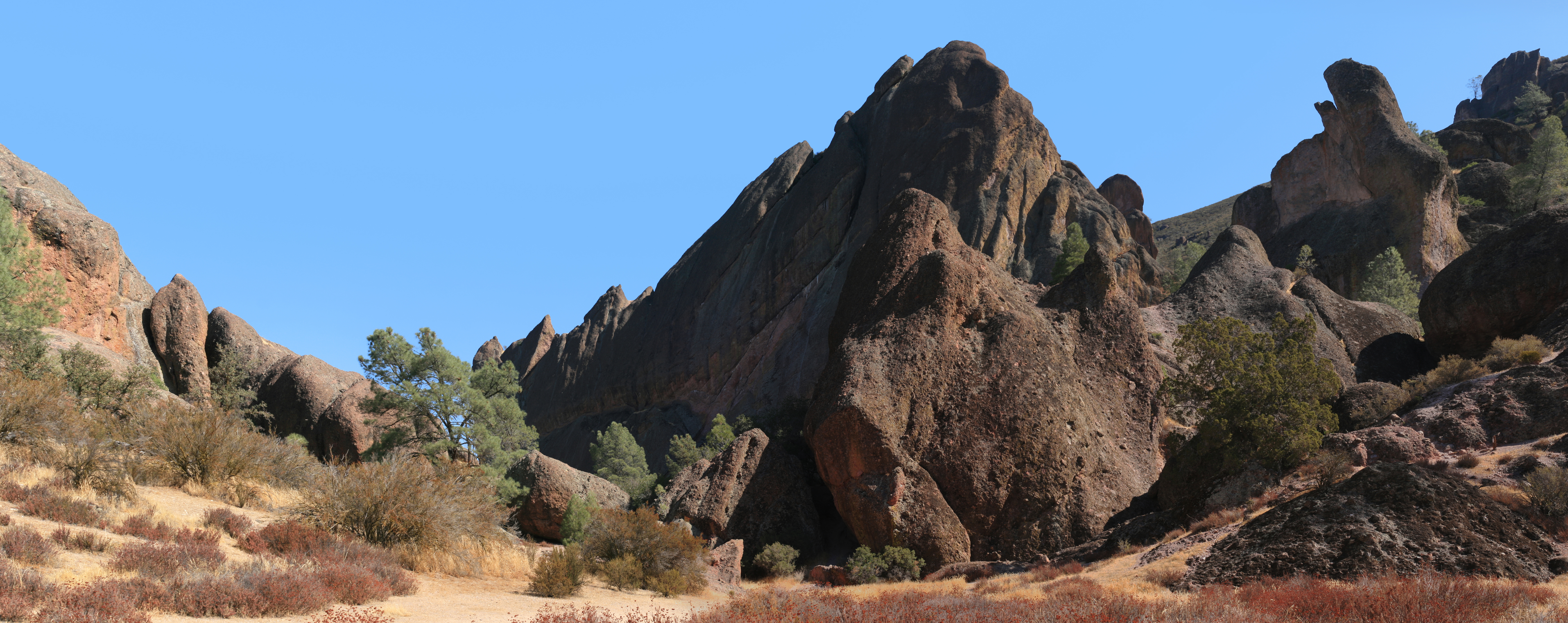
- Rock formations at Pinnacles National Park
- Interactive map of Pinnacles National Park
- Location: San Benito & Monterey counties, California, United States
- Nearest city: Soledad, California
- Coordinates: 36°29′13″N 121°10′01″W
- Area: 26,606 acres (107.67 km^{2})
- Established: January 16, 1908 as a national monument January 10, 2013 as a national park
- Visitors: 275,023 (in 2022)
- Governing body: National Park Service
- Website: www.nps.gov/pinn/index.htm

Pinnacles National Park is a national park of the United States protecting a mountainous area located east of the Salinas Valley in Central California, about five miles (8 km) east of Soledad and 80 miles (130 km) southeast of San Jose. The park's namesake pinnacles are the eroded leftovers of the western half of an extinct volcano that has moved 200 miles (320 km) from its original location on the San Andreas Fault, embedded in a portion of the California Pacific Coast Ranges. Pinnacles is managed by the National Park Service and the majority of the park is protected as wilderness.

The national park is divided by the rock formations into East and West Divisions, connected only by foot trails. The east side has shade and water, while the west has high walls. The rock formations provide for spectacular pinnacles that attract rock climbers. The park features unusual talus caves that house at least 13 species of bats. Pinnacles is most often visited in spring or fall because of the intense heat during the summer. Park lands are prime habitat for prairie falcons and are a release site for California condors that have been hatched in captivity.

Pinnacles was originally established as a national monument in 1908 by President Theodore Roosevelt, and was redesignated as a national park in 2013 by Congress.

== History ==
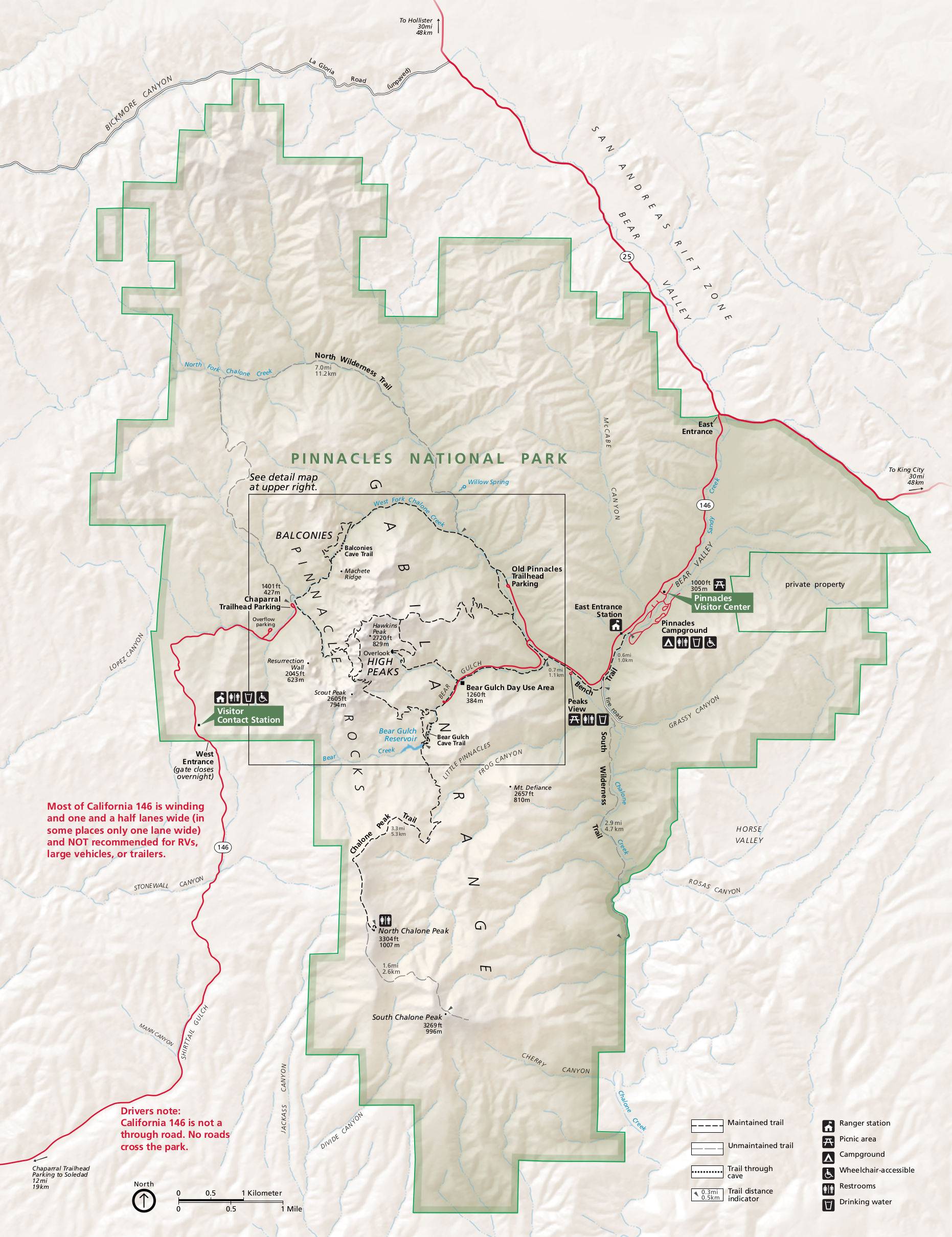
Park map

Native Americans in the Pinnacles region comprised the Chalon and Mutsun groups of the Ohlone people, who left stone artifacts in the park. These native people declined with the arrival of the Spanish in the 18th century, who brought novel diseases and changes to the natives' way of life. The establishment of a Spanish mission at Soledad hastened the area's native depopulation through disease and dispersion. Archaeological surveys have found 13 sites inhabited by Native Americans, 12 of which antedate the establishment of the missions. One site is believed to be about 2000 years old. The last Chalon had died or departed from the area by 1810. From 1810 to 1865, when the first Anglo-American settlers arrived, the Pinnacles region was a wilderness without human use or habitation.

By the 1880s the Pinnacles, then known as the Palisades, were visited by picnickers from the surrounding communities who would explore the caves and camp. The first account of the Pinnacles region appeared in print in 1881, describing the Balconies area. Between 1889 and 1891, newspaper articles shifted from describing excursions to the "Palisades" to calling them the "Pinnacles". Interest in the area rose to the point that the Hollister Free Lance sent a reporter to the Pinnacles, followed two months later by a party of local officials. Investors came from San Francisco to consider placing a resort hotel there, but the speculation came to nothing. In 1894, a post office was established in Bear Valley. Schuyler Hain was the postmaster. Since at least one other Bear Valley was in California, the post office was named "Cook" after Hain's wife's maiden name. In 1924, the post office was renamed "Pinnacles".

Hain was a homesteader who arrived in the Pinnacles area in 1891 from Michigan, following his parents and eight siblings to Bear Valley. His cousin, A. W. White, was a student at Stanford University, and White brought G. K. Gilbert, one of his professors, to see the Pinnacles in 1893. Gilbert was impressed by the scenery, and his comments inspired Hain to publicize the region. Hain led tours to Bear Valley and through the caves, advocating the preservation of the Pinnacles. Hain's efforts resulted in a 1904 visit by Stanford president David Starr Jordan, who contacted Fresno Congressman James C. Needham. Jordan and Needham, in turn, influenced Gifford Pinchot to advocate the establishment of the Pinnacles Forest Reserve to President Theodore Roosevelt, who proclaimed the establishment on July 18, 1906. Pinchot, who was primarily interested in the management of forests for productive use rather than for preservation, advocated the use of the recently passed Antiquities Act to designate the scenic core of the area as Pinnacles National Monument, which was done by Roosevelt on January 16, 1908. This designation nominally passed control of the Pinnacles from the Department of Agriculture to the Department of the Interior, but the U.S. Forest Service retained effective control of the area until circa 1911.

In his efforts to promote the Pinnacles, Hain became convinced that the Pinnacles were an "extraordinary mountain" described by Captain George Vancouver and pictured by John Sykes in his book Voyage of Discovery, which documented the Vancouver Expedition. Hain began to refer to the mountain as "Vancouver's Pinnacles", a term that was picked up by Sunset in a 1903 article. References to "Vancouver's Pinnacles" persisted until 1955, when analysis of the Sykes picture indicated that the mountain described by Vancouver was actually located near Fort Ord, within easy reach of the day trip described by Vancouver.

=== National monument ===
First set aside as part of the Pinnacles Forest Reserve in 1906, Pinnacles has had several different federal management agencies, ranging from the U.S. Forest Service to the United States General Land Office and ultimately to the National Park Service. In 1908 President Theodore Roosevelt created Pinnacles National Monument with the power given him in the Antiquities Act of 1906. The initial area designated under the Antiquities Act was 2,080 acres (840 ha). The Forest Service relinquished control of the monument circa 1911, but no operating agency yet existed to receive it. No drivable roads existed into the park from communities like Hollister. Hollister boosters campaigned for federal funds for road-building. Congressman Everis A. Hayes made a trip into the Pinnacles in 1913 as part of the campaign for road funds. By 1914, primitive roads extended to Bear Valley.

The National Park Service was finally established in 1916, but Pinnacles was not considered significant enough to command any Park Service resources at that time. In the meantime, a mining claim disrupted access to the traditional picnic grounds. In 1922, following repeated pleas from local residents for Park Service action, W.B. Lewis, superintendent of Yosemite National Park, was directed to visit Pinnacles and report on the circumstances to Park Service director Stephen Mather. Lewis had a difficult trip and stayed only 45 minutes, and his report included a recommendation that the monument be abandoned, since the most scenic sections were in private hands. The General Land Office, which administered lands surrounding the national monument and what was then known as Monterey National Forest, also received complaints, and in December 1922, J.H. Favorite of the GLO made a thorough report which was copied to Mather. Favorite recommended that public-domain lands be consolidated into the monument, and that a caretaker be appointed from a local homestead. In 1923, Herman Hermansen was appointed caretaker, and on May 7, 1923, the monument was enlarged by proclamation of President Warren G. Harding.

Mather finally visited the monument on March 28, 1924. A further proclamation, this time by Calvin Coolidge, enlarged the monument on July 2, 1924, securing water sources and campsites, was followed by a directive for a complete survey of the now-2,973-acre (1,203 ha) monument. Following a visit by NPS assistant director Horace M. Albright, money was appropriated to build a ranger's cabin, completed in 1929, while facilities within the caves were improved. Frank A. Kittredge, the Park Service chief of engineering, and Thomas Chalmers Vint, Park Service landscape architect, conducted a survey for a five-year improvement plan in 1927. In 1929, condemnation proceedings were filed against private landowners in and around the park, including the mining company, seeking 1,286.27 acres (520.54 ha). An expansion proclamation by President Herbert Hoover in 1931 added 1,926.35 acres (779.57 ha) of land donated by San Benito County. Trail building was expanded in the early 1930s, including a tunnel for the High Peaks Trail.

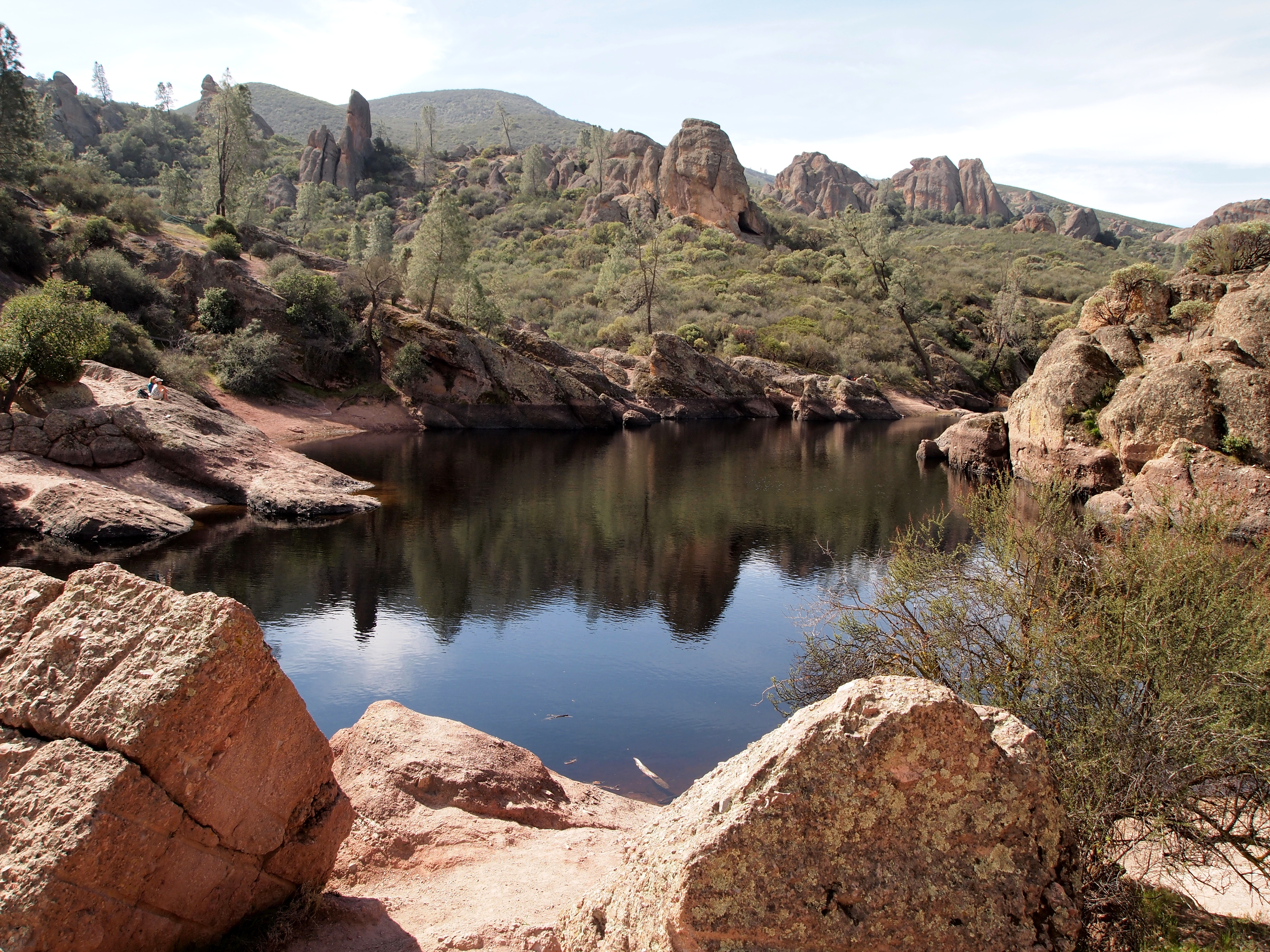
Bear Gulch Reservoir

In 1933, a Civilian Conservation Corps camp was established for about 200 men who worked on additions to the trail network. After lengthy legal proceedings, the old mining claims were incorporated into the monument in 1958. CCC laborers improved the road in Bear Gulch, built tourist cabins, and constructed the dam at the Bear Gulch reservoir. A fire lookout was built by the CCC on Chalone Peak in 1935, but was destroyed by fire in 1951 and replaced by a frame structure the following year. The park's visitor center and headquarters were built in 1936–37 from local stone. A superintendent's residence was started in 1941 and completed in 1949. The Mission 66 project added lands and new projects, with an emphasis on development of the previously undeveloped west side of the park.

In 1975, the park comprised 16,721 acres (6,767 ha), growing to the present 26,606 acres (10,767 ha) through a series of additions including the 2,000-acre (810 ha) Pinnacles Ranch. The most recent addition to the Pinnacles National Monument was president Bill Clinton's Proclamation 7266 in the year 2000 that increased the size of the monument by 7,900 acres (32 km^{2}) and to include more caves.

=== National park status ===
Legislation authored by Rep. Sam Farr (D-California) to make Pinnacles National Monument a national park passed the United States Senate on December 30, 2012, having passed the House on July 31, 2012. The bill also designates the present Pinnacles Wilderness as the Hain Wilderness in commemoration of Schuyler Hain's efforts to establish the national monument. The legislation was signed by President Barack Obama on January 10, 2013. The change in designation did not change the park's status, management, or purpose. The U.S. Congress specified in the 1970 General Authorities Act and the 1978 Redwood Act that all units of the National Park System are to be treated on equal status, regardless of title. Pinnacles is the ninth unit in the National Park System in California to be named a national park.

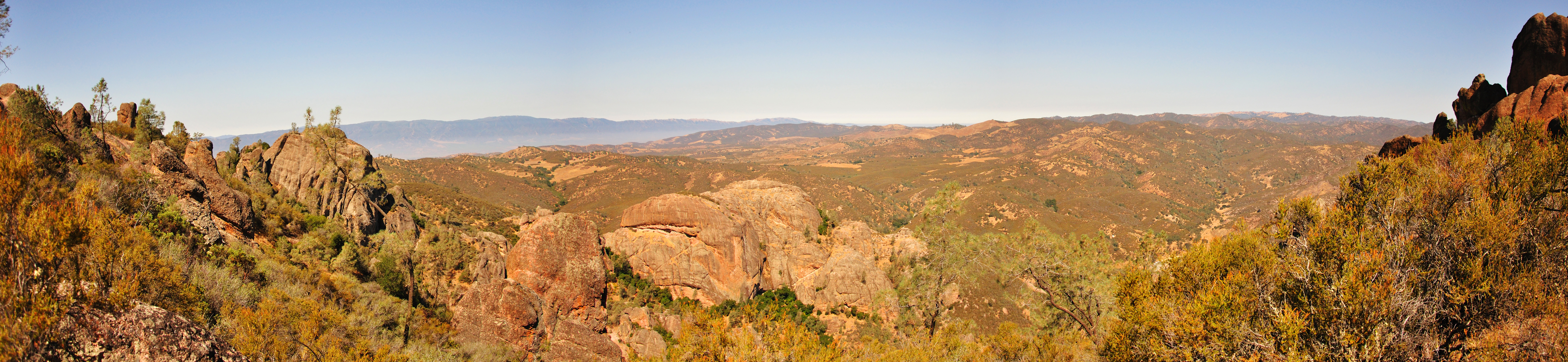
High Peaks Trail panorama

== Geography ==
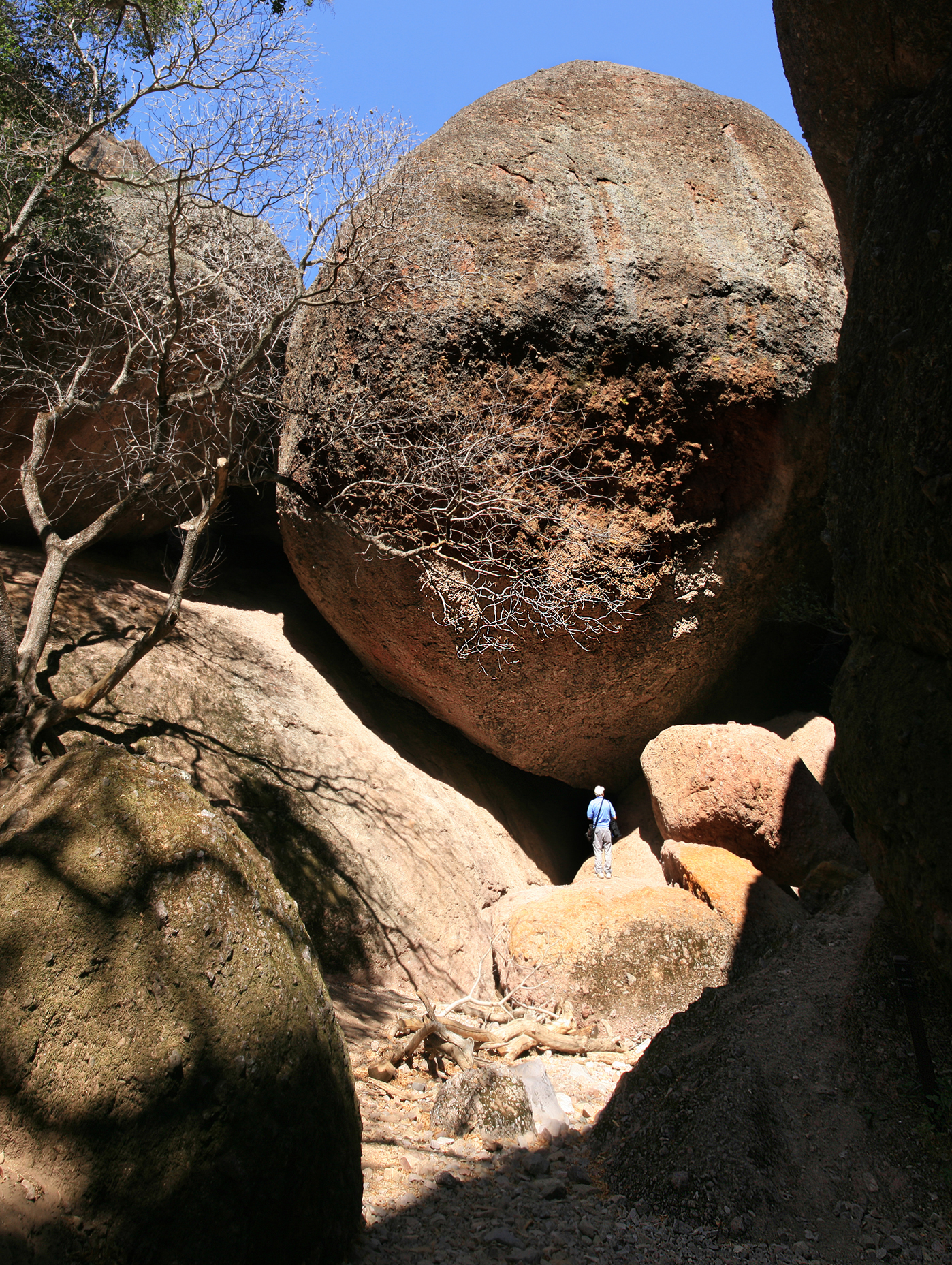
Entrance to Balconies Cave

Pinnacles National Park lies about 40 miles (64 km) inland from the Pacific Ocean and about 45 miles (72 km) south of the San Francisco Bay Area. The park is in the southern portion of the Gabilan Range, part of California's Coast Ranges.

Elevation within the boundaries range from 824 to 3,304 feet (251 to 1,007 m) at the peak of North Chalone Peak.

=== Climate ===
According to the Köppen climate classification system, Pinnacles National Park has a hot-summer Mediterranean climate (Csa). According to the United States Department of Agriculture, the Plant Hardiness zone at the Painted Desert Visitor Center (1,056 feet or 322 metres) is 8b with an average annual extreme minimum temperature of 19.3 °F or −7.1 °C.

The Santa Lucia Mountains lie between the park and Pacific Ocean, blocking the ocean's moderating influence on diurnal temperature swings. In comparison to the nearby coast, temperatures have a much larger daily range of 30 to 50 °F (16.7 to 27.8 °C) depending on season. The typical rainfall is about 17 inches (430 mm) per year. Snow can fall in small amounts at higher elevations between mid-December and January.

The National Weather Service has a cooperative weather station at the park headquarters. January temperatures are a maximum of 62.6 °F (17.0 °C) and a minimum of 34.0 °F (1.1 °C). July temperatures are a maximum of 95.9 °F (35.5 °C) and a minimum of 50.4 °F (10.2 °C). The record high temperature of 116 °F (46.7 °C) was reached three times, most recently on September 7, 2020. The record low temperature was 10 °F (−12.2 °C) on January 2, 1960 and December 22 and 24, 1990. Average annual rainfall is 16.57 inches or 420.9 millimeters. The wettest "rain year" was from July 1982 to June 1983 with 33.45 inches or 849.6 millimeters and the driest from July 1975 to June 1976 with 8.61 inches or 218.7 millimeters, although in calendar year 2013 only 2.70 inches or 68.6 millimeters fell. The most rainfall in one month was 11.86 inches or 301.2 millimeters in February 1998. The most rainfall in 24 hours was 4.74 inches or 120.4 millimeters on February 3, 1998. The most snowfall in one month was 7.0 inches or 0.18 meters in January 1962.

Climate data for Pinnacles National Monument, California (1991–2020 normals, extremes 1937–present)
Month	Jan	Feb	Mar	Apr	May	Jun	Jul	Aug	Sep	Oct	Nov	Dec	Year
Record high °F (°C)	87 (31)	86 (30)	93 (34)	100 (38)	106 (41)	112 (44)	116 (47)	115 (46)	116 (47)	116 (47)	94 (34)	90 (32)	116 (47)
Mean maximum °F (°C)	75.9 (24.4)	77.6 (25.3)	82.4 (28.0)	89.8 (32.1)	95.9 (35.5)	103.9 (39.9)	106.5 (41.4)	107.1 (41.7)	104.7 (40.4)	97.9 (36.6)	86.7 (30.4)	75.0 (23.9)	109.5 (43.1)
Mean daily maximum °F (°C)	62.6 (17.0)	63.7 (17.6)	67.5 (19.7)	72.3 (22.4)	80.0 (26.7)	88.8 (31.6)	95.9 (35.5)	95.8 (35.4)	91.7 (33.2)	82.5 (28.1)	70.4 (21.3)	62.0 (16.7)	77.8 (25.4)
Daily mean °F (°C)	48.3 (9.1)	49.6 (9.8)	52.6 (11.4)	55.8 (13.2)	61.5 (16.4)	67.7 (19.8)	73.2 (22.9)	73.0 (22.8)	69.9 (21.1)	62.6 (17.0)	53.5 (11.9)	47.7 (8.7)	59.6 (15.3)
Mean daily minimum °F (°C)	34.0 (1.1)	35.6 (2.0)	37.7 (3.2)	39.4 (4.1)	43.1 (6.2)	46.6 (8.1)	50.4 (10.2)	50.3 (10.2)	48.1 (8.9)	42.7 (5.9)	36.7 (2.6)	33.4 (0.8)	41.5 (5.3)
Mean minimum °F (°C)	23.2 (−4.9)	25.1 (−3.8)	27.6 (−2.4)	29.7 (−1.3)	33.1 (0.6)	35.9 (2.2)	39.0 (3.9)	39.8 (4.3)	37.9 (3.3)	32.2 (0.1)	26.1 (−3.3)	22.3 (−5.4)	19.8 (−6.8)
Record low °F (°C)	10 (−12)	17 (−8)	16 (−9)	18 (−8)	22 (−6)	24 (−4)	30 (−1)	28 (−2)	29 (−2)	24 (−4)	15 (−9)	10 (−12)	10 (−12)
Average rainfall inches (mm)	3.46 (88)	3.45 (88)	2.80 (71)	0.96 (24)	0.57 (14)	0.13 (3.3)	0.04 (1.0)	0.02 (0.51)	0.06 (1.5)	0.73 (19)	1.27 (32)	3.08 (78)	16.57 (421)
Average rainy days (≥ 0.01 in)	12.2	11.2	10.1	5.7	3.3	0.7	0.3	0.3	0.6	2.9	7.2	12.0	66.5
Source: NOAA

== Geology ==
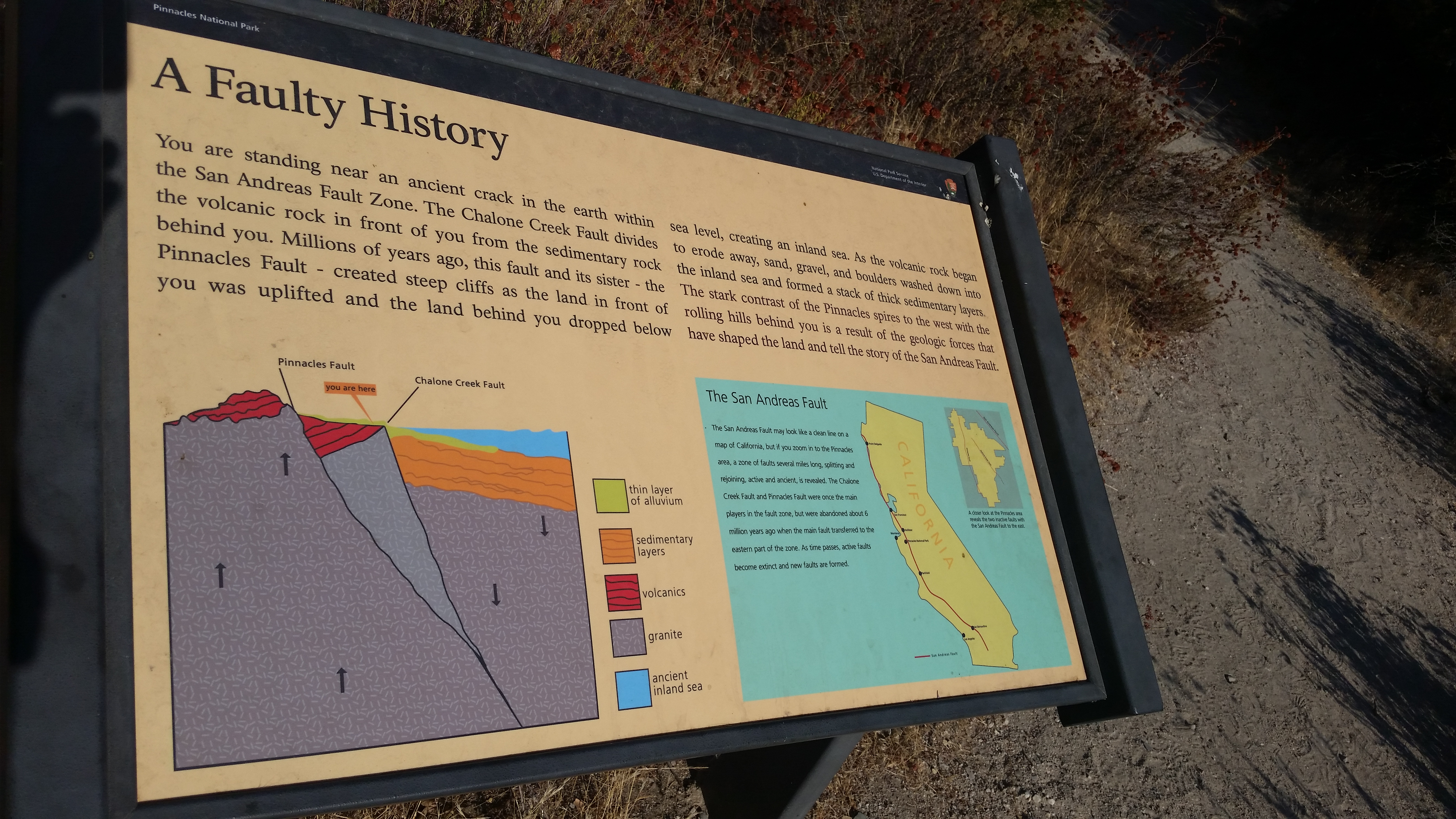
Fault history sign

The park is located near the San Andreas Fault, which had a hand in giving rise to the unique formations the park protects. The Pinnacles are part of the Neenach Volcano which erupted 23 million years ago near present-day Lancaster. The movement of the Pacific Plate along the San Andreas Fault split a section of rock off from the main body of the volcano and moved it 195 miles (314 km) to the northwest. It is believed that the pinnacles came from this particular volcano because of the unique breccias that are only found elsewhere in the Neenach Volcano formations. Differential erosion and weathering of the exposed rock formed the Pinnacles that are seen today. The rock formations are andesite and rhyolite, forming a dropped fault block embedded in the Gabilan Range.

Large-scale earth movement also formed the talus caves that can be found in the park. Deep, narrow gorges and shear fractures were transformed into caves by large chunks of rock falling from above and wedging into the cracks, leaving an open area below.

Since the Pinnacles were moved to this area, the San Andreas Fault has shifted four miles (6.4 km) to the east of the park. The original location of the San Andreas can be seen in the Chalone Creek fault. Two other large faults are known to run through the park, the Miner's Gulch and Pinnacles faults. These faults parallel the San Andreas and were most likely caused by major movements of the main fault. The establishment of the relative movement between the Pinnacles and the Neenach rocks was a significant factor in the acceptance of plate tectonics in geology.

At 10:50 p.m. PST on November 19, 2026, the 5.1 magnitude Coco McBride Earthquake occurred with an epicenter approximately 10 km (6.2 mi) northwest of Pinnacles National Park. The United States Geological Survey (USGS) reported an initial local magnitude of 5.4 and reviewed magnitude of approximately 5.1. Intense shaking was felt throughout Monterey County, California. The initial automatic USGS ShakeMap estimated a maximum shaking intensity of approximately VI (Strong) on the Modified Mercalli intensity scale within the mapped area.

Seismic activity is frequent in the park, and United States Geological Survey maintains two seismometers within the boundaries. Evidence of past and ongoing seismic activity can be seen in offset streams where they cross faults. Valley bottoms and terraces show signs of uplift.

== Ecology ==
=== Wildlife ===
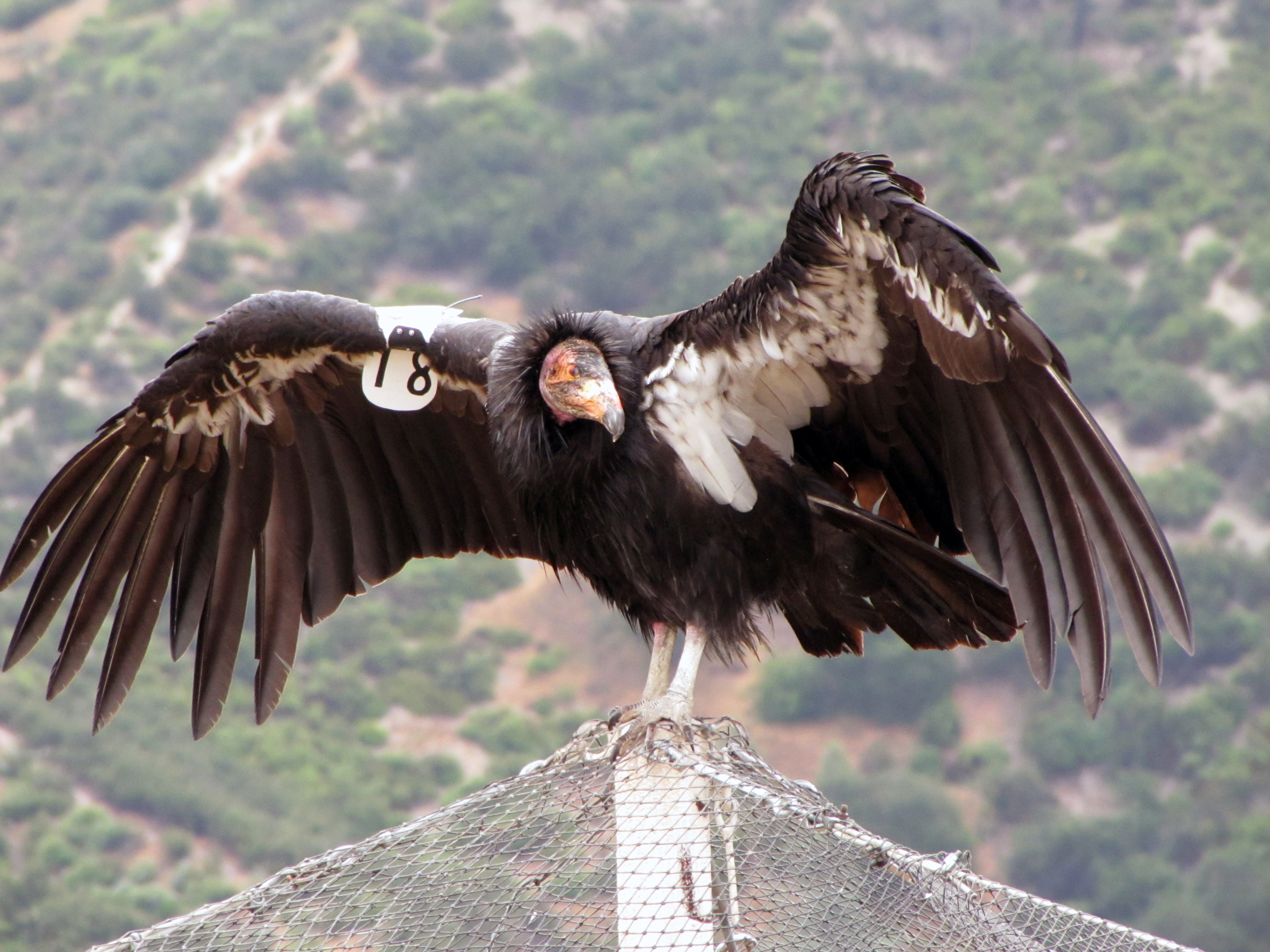
California condor

Native animals, now locally extinct from most of central California, included tule elk and pronghorn. Grizzly and black bears were in the area until the end of the 19th century. Mammals and birds that inhabit this park include prairie falcon, coyote, skunk, great horned owl, bobcat, California quail, raccoon, wild turkey, gray fox, golden eagle, and cougar.

Prairie falcons breed in this area in some of the highest densities of anywhere in North America. Peregrine falcons have recently returned to the park to breed, also, but in far fewer numbers. A California condor re-establishment program has been in place since 2003. The first nest since reintroduction was built in 2010, and Pinnacles now manages a population of 25 free-flying condor.

Thirteen species of bat have been documented at Pinnacles, with a further three species considered likely. The talus caves provide roosting and breeding habitat for the bats.

In the 1990s a student biologist, Olivia Messinger, did a census of bees at Pinnacles. She found that the park has more bees per unit area than known anywhere else on earth, around 450 species. Most of these bees are solitary bees, not living in colonies like European honeybees, and most live for only three to four weeks, and since flowers bloom here throughout the growing season many niches are available for all the bee species.

Like many parks in central California, Pinnacles has had a problem with wild pigs (a mix of feral domestic pigs and imported wild boars) disturbing the landscape on a regular basis. As of spring 2006, the core of the park was pig-free. The culmination of a twenty-year, $1.6 million effort had succeeded in eradicating pigs from the main area of the park. National Park Service personnel along with IWS worked to remove pigs from inside the park and establish and monitor an exclusionary fence that runs for approximately 26 miles (42 km) around the core of the park. Outside this fence, wild pigs still roam. Monitoring for potential breaks and breaches in the fence is performed to ensure that the pigs do not return to the park.

=== Vegetation ===
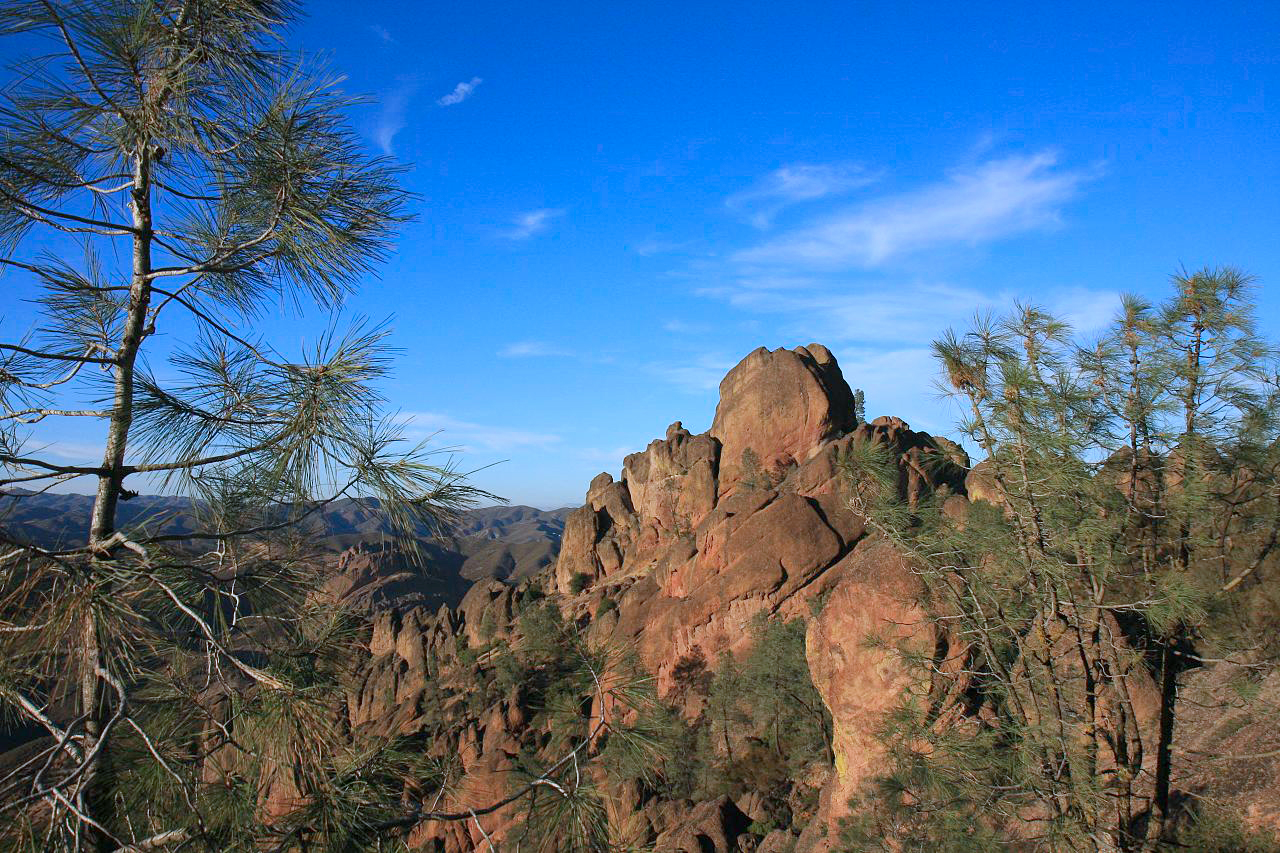
Pinus sabiniana (gray pine)

According to the A. W. Kuchler U.S. Potential natural vegetation Types, Pinnacles National Park has a Chaparral (33) potential vegetation type with a California chaparral and woodlands (6) vegetation form. The vegetation is about 80% chaparral with woodlands, riparian, and grasslands merged into the chaparral.

In the warmer portions of the park, large areas of greasewood cover slopes, along with manzanita, gray pine, canyon live oak, and blue oak. Cooler portions of the park have higher proportions of pines and oaks, together with California buckeye, hollyleaf cherry, and coffeeberry. Willows and elderberries are found along the intermittent streams. Fire has been a dominant influence on the region's flora, both from natural causes and from intentional intervention by people. When the region was inhabited by Native Americans, they used fire as a tool to encourage the growth of preferred food sources, and to herd small game during hunting. Since the disappearance of native peoples, the hills have become brushier.

== Hain Wilderness ==
More than 80% (15,985 acres or 6,469 hectares) of the park is designated as the Hain Wilderness (known until 2013 as the Pinnacles Wilderness). Wilderness designation provides even higher protection for the rock spires that give Pinnacles its name, as well as South Chalone Peak, the second-highest peak in the park. The wilderness includes the creeks and canyons that are habitat for the endangered California red-legged frog. The United States Congress in 1976 enacted Public Law 94-567, adding Pinnacles Wilderness and several others to the National Wilderness Preservation System.

== Activities ==
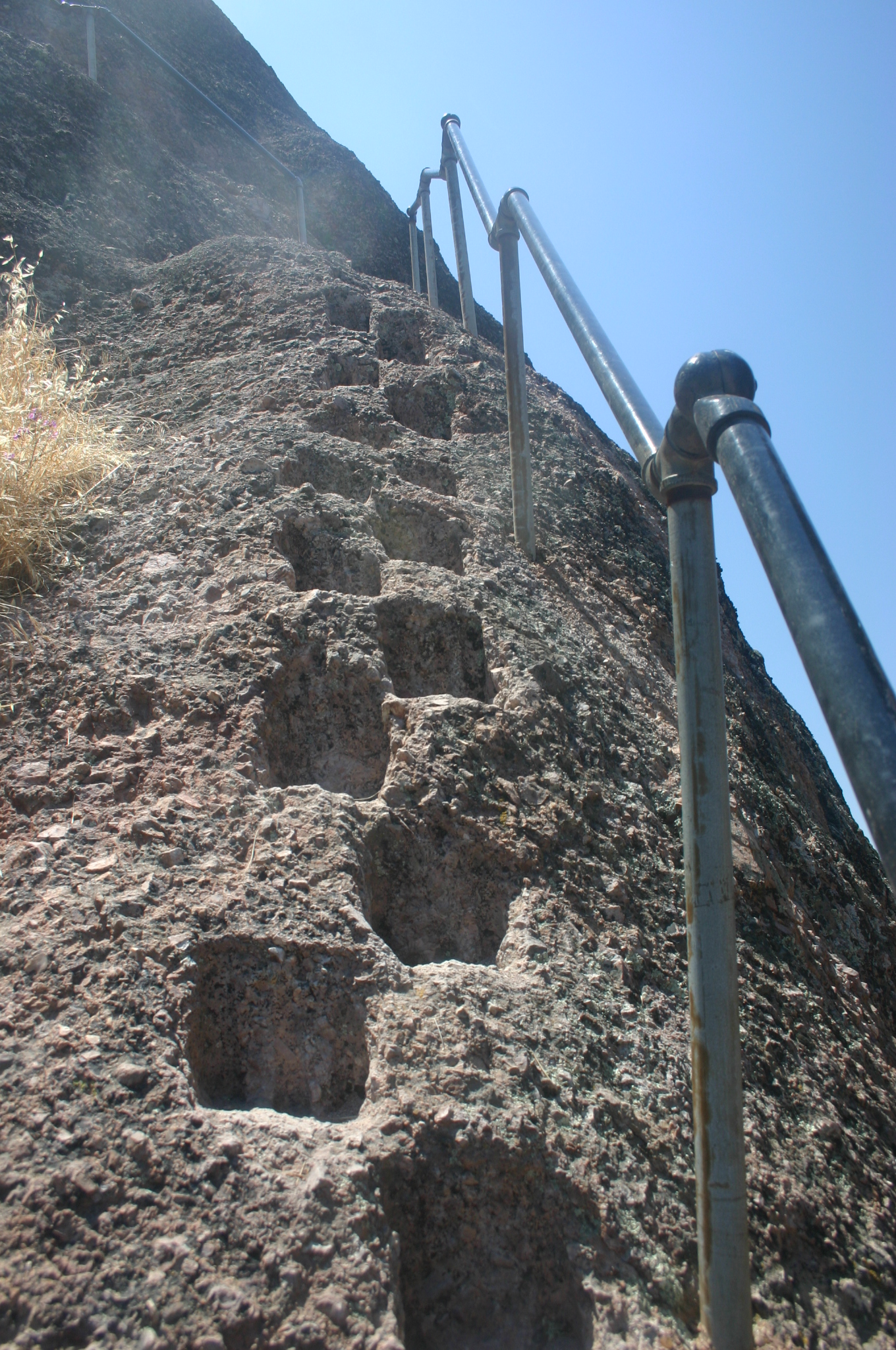
A section of the High Peaks Trail

Although roads approach the park from the west through Soledad and from the east through empty lands south of Hollister, the roads do not connect in the park. Most of the developed areas are on the east side of the park. Portions of the park's road network are listed on the National Register of Historic Places.

Several trails have been developed for day hikers, some of which are strenuous. Primarily in March and April, a wide variety of wildflowers is on display, except in years of extreme drought. The trails provide views of the surrounding hills and valleys on clear days. The San Andreas Fault is visible from some vantages along the trails. The park includes a well-known hiking portion known among enthusiasts simply as "The Pig Fence". This portion of South Wilderness Trail is a challenging stretch of strenuous hiking that at times requires use of the fence, erected to prevent feral pigs from entering the park, to help oneself to climb the steeply pitched trail. Other trails include lush wildflower-accented views along flat stream beds, trails that bring one into beautiful caves, and trails that involve high vistas of the Pinnacle formations.

The caves at Pinnacles are talus caves, formed when steep, narrow canyons were filled with boulders, leaving passages between the larger rocks. Bear Gulch Cave on the east side of the park and Balconies Cave on the west side are seasonally open to visitors. Trails lead to and through both caves. These caves house breeding colonies for Townsend's big-eared bat and are closed during pupping season. The caves may be flooded at times of high water. The National Park Service maintains a webpage showing the status of the caves.

Camping facilities are available on the east side in the Pinnacles Campground.

The park is popular with advanced rock climbers because of the many difficult and challenging climbs. The park is home to a variety of bouldering, single-pitch, and multi-pitch routes. Rock quality, volcanic breccia, can break while climbing.

== See also ==
- List of national parks of the United States
- State Route 146
- State Route 25
- National parks in California
- Neenach Volcano
- Tres Pinos, California
- Trona Pinnacles — in southern California near Ridgecrest and Trona
