= Public Law 94-567 =

1976 US Federal law regarding wilderness areas

- Long title: An Act to designate certain lands within units of the National Park System as wilderness; to revise the boundaries of certain of those units; and for other purposes.
- Enacted by: the 94th United States Congress
- Effective: October 20, 1976

Citations
- Public law: 94-567

Legislative history
- Introduced in the House as H.R. 8298 by Roy Taylor (D–NC) on April 9, 1976; Committee consideration by United States House Committee on Natural Resources; Passed the House on September 22, 1976; Passed the Senate on October 1, 1976 with amendment; House agreed to Senate amendment on October 1, 1976 (); Signed into law by President Gerald Ford on October 20, 1976

Public Law 94-567 is a 1976 Federal law that established a number of new designated Wilderness Areas on National Park Service lands. Signed into law by President Gerald Ford on October 20, 1976, the new statute added almost 900,000 acres of wilderness into the National Wilderness Preservation System. While the majority of designated Wilderness Areas at the time were located in National Forests, this was one of the first laws to formally establish wilderness areas in National Parks and Monuments.

== Background ==
Responding to a heightened public interest in conservation and an increased threat to public lands by development, and other intrusive or consumptive activities, such as logging, Congress passed the Wilderness Act of 1964, Public Law 88-577 (16 U.S.C. 1131–1136) on September 3, 1964. Created, in the words of the law, “to secure for the American people of present and future generations the benefits of an enduring resource of wilderness,” the law created the National Wilderness Preservation System and a set of criteria and administrative processes by which natural areas could be added to this system.

Under this new law, proposed areas on by the U.S. Forest Service, National Park Service, and U.S. Fish and Wildlife Service could be designated as Wilderness Areas, special reserves protected from human encroachment and development. Within these areas, unless specially exempted, Congress mandated that there “shall be no commercial enterprise and no permanent road within any wilderness area designated by this Act and, except as necessary to meet minimum requirements for the administration of the area...there shall be no temporary road, no use of motor vehicles, motorized equipment or motorboats, no landing of aircraft, no other form of mechanical transport, and no structure or installation within any such area.” To be kept in as close to a pristine natural state as possible, these areas would only be open to hikers and backpackers, who would be expected to follow low-impact, “Leave No Trace” camping practices.

== Legislative history ==
What would become Public Law 94-567 was introduced into the House on April 9, 1976, by North Carolina Democrat Roy Taylor. The bill, H.R. 13160 (94th), would have 19 co-sponsors in the House, including New Mexico Republican Manuel Lujan Jr., and Arizona Democrat Morris Udall, both of whom would successfully sponsor important Wilderness laws the next year. Passing through the House Committee on Natural Resources, the bill passed the House on September 20, 1976, and was sent to the Senate. The bill was approved, with changes, on October 1, 1976, and sent back to the House for approval, which came the same day. Passed by both Houses, the bill was signed by President Gerald Ford on October 20, 1976.

== Section I ==
The first section of the law established designated Wilderness Areas in certain units of the National Park System. These new areas included:

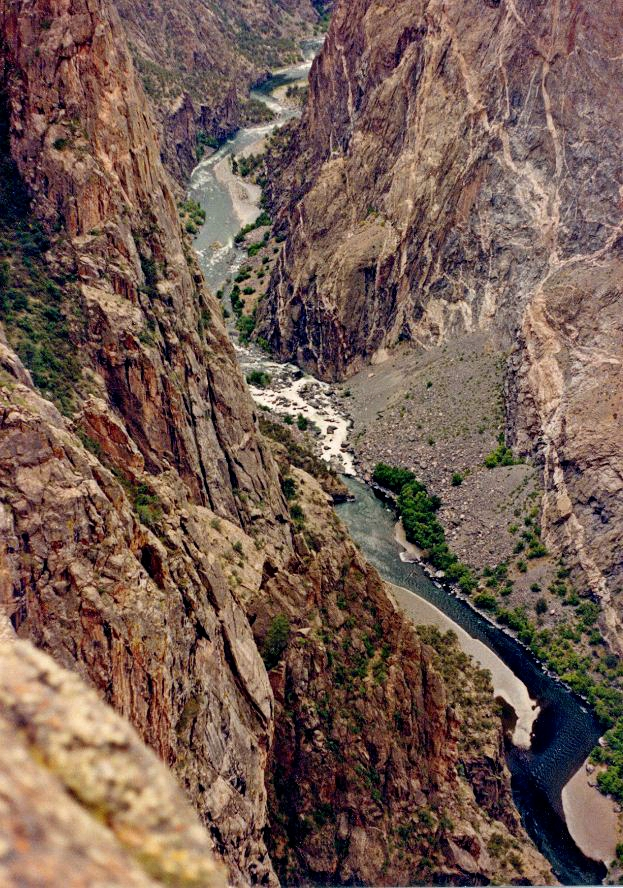
Black Canyon of the Gunnison, Colorado

- 23,267 acres in Bandelier National Monument in New Mexico
- 11,180 acres in the Black Canyon of the Gunnison National Monument in Colorado
- 9,440 acres in the Chiricahua National Monument in Arizona
- 33,450 acres in the Great Sand Dunes National Monument in Colorado
- 19,270 acres in the Haleakala National Monument in Hawaii
- 131,850 acres in Isle Royale National Park in Michigan
- 429,690 acres in the Joshua Tree National Monument in California
- 8,100 acres in the Mesa Verde National Monument in Colorado
- 12,952 acres in the Pinnacles National Monument in California
- 71,400 acres in the Saguaro National Monument in Arizona
- 25,370 acres in the Point Reyes National Seashore in California
- 64,250 acres in the Badlands National Monument in South Dakota
- 79,019 acres in the Shenandoah National Park in Virginia

== Section II ==
The second section of the law ordered that maps and legal descriptions of each Wilderness Area should be available for public inspection in the office of the Director of the National Park Service, and with the superintendent of the parent unit of each new Wilderness, and, as soon as practicable, with the Interior and Insular Affairs Committees of both the House and Senate. The law further ordered that the maps and descriptions submitted should have the same force and effect as if they had been included in this law.

== Section III ==
Noted that all of the areas named above would be considered as Wilderness Areas as soon as the Secretary of the Interior published a bulletin in the Federal Register stating that all activities prohibited in Wilderness Areas, such as development, consumptive activities, etc. had ceased.

== Section IV ==
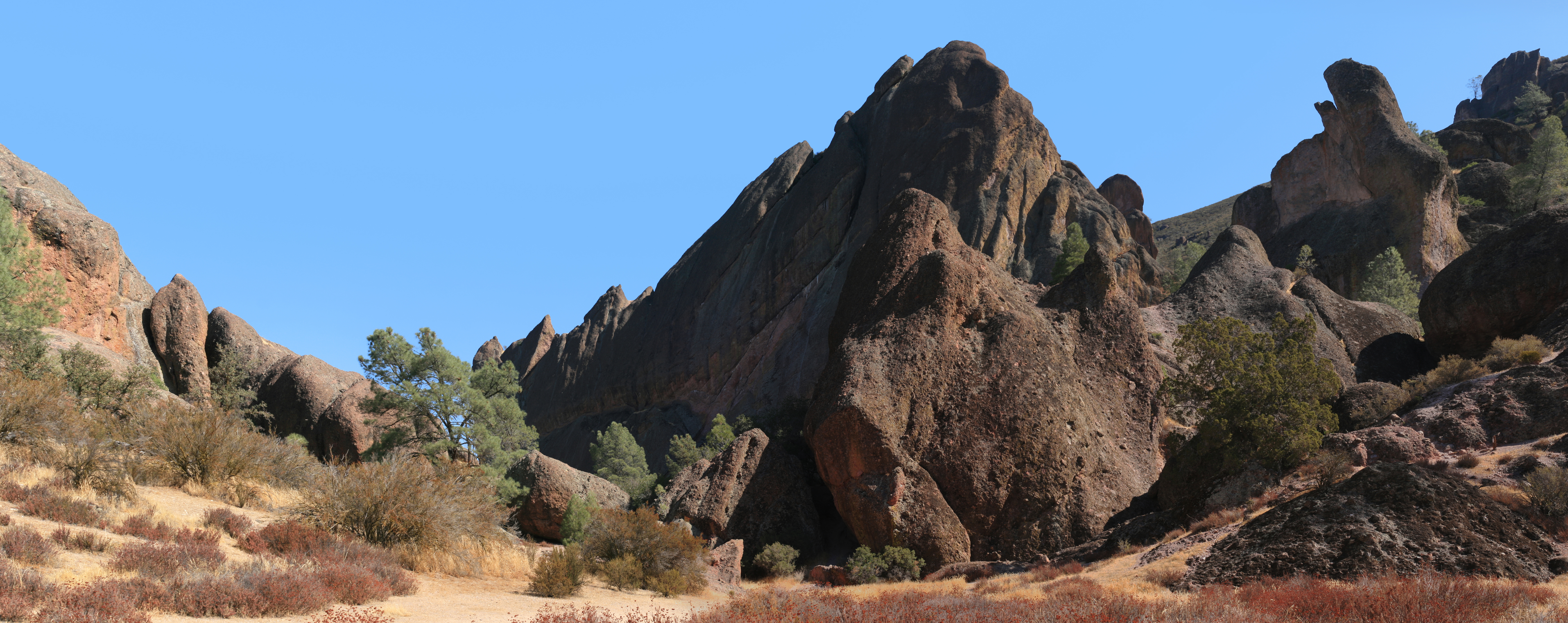
Pinnacles National Monument

Authorized the addition of certain lands to the Isle Royale National Seashore in Michigan and Pinnacles National Monument in California. This section also ordered the Secretary of the Interior, as responsible official for the National Park Service, to attempt to obtain these additional lands by donation, purchase, transfer, or exchange, and authorized an appropriation of no more than $955,000 for their acquisition.

== Section V ==
This section of the law addressed an issue concerning Wilderness Areas in U. S. Forest Service administered lands by instructing the Secretary of Agriculture, as responsible official for the Forest Service to review a 62,930-acre area of the Coronado National Forest in Arizona known as the Rincon Wilderness Study Area for its potential designation as a Wilderness Area.

== Other sections ==
Other elements of the law authorized the renaming of the main environmental education facility at the Point Reyes National Seashore after recently deceased Representative Clem Miller in recognition of his role in championing the creation of the seashore.

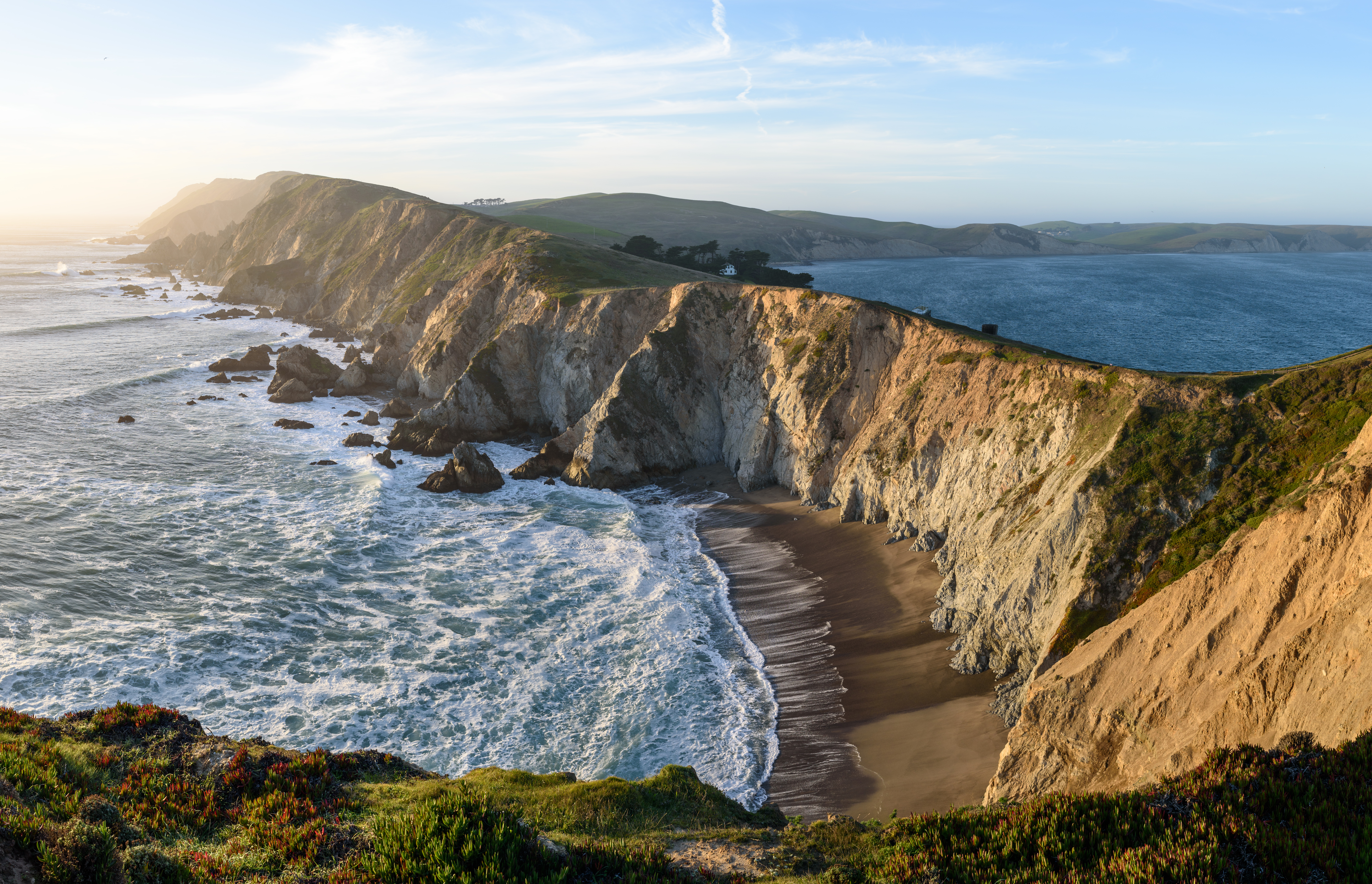
Point Reyes National Seashore

== See also ==
- Wilderness Act of 1964
- National Wilderness Preservation System
- Endangered American Wilderness Act of 1978
- New Mexico Wilderness Act of 1980
