= Neenach Volcano =

Extinct volcano sheared by the San Andreas Fault in California

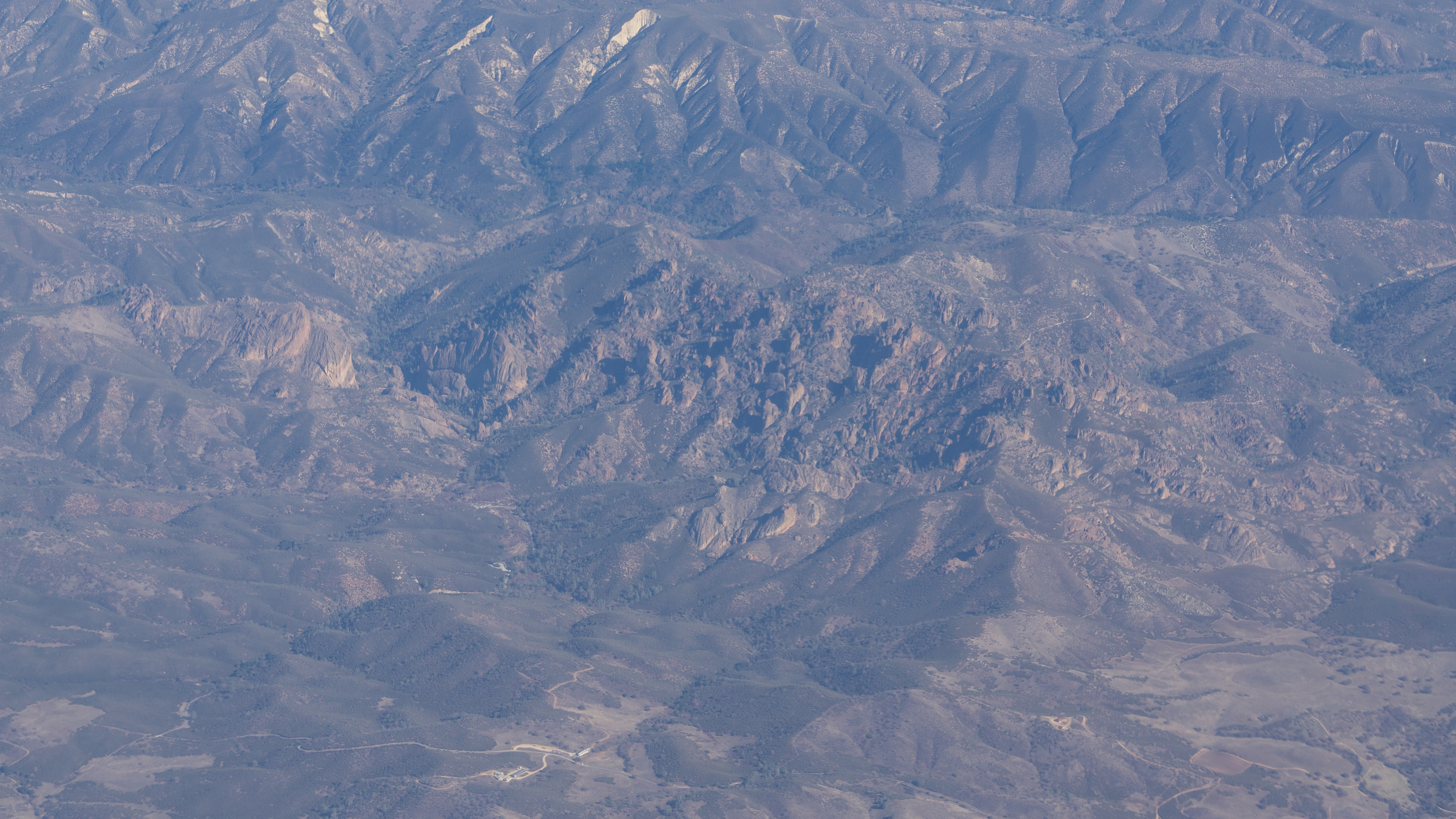
Aerial view of the rock formations at Pinnacles National Park, looking down from the northwest toward the southeast.

Neenach Volcano is an extinct Miocene volcano in the Coastal Ranges of California. After formation, the volcanic field was split by a fault in the San Andreas Fault Zone, and over the last 23 million years, both halves of the volcano have moved about 195 miles (314 kilometers) apart.

The correlation of the two portions, now called the Pinnacles and Neenach volcanic formations, is significant. This correlation has become a "classic example" of plate tectonics for the scientific community. Ten rock types with nearly identical field, petrographic, and chemical characteristics are present in each formation in essentially the same stratigraphic order. This provides ample evidence for the correlation and interpreted movement along the San Andreas Fault.

The volcano formed 23 million years ago during tectonic subduction of the oceanic Juan de Fuca Plate beneath the continental North American Plate, a process often associated with volcanic eruptions near the plate boundaries. Subsequent complex geophysical mechanisms caused a segment of the Juan de Fuca Plate to fuse to the eastern edge of the adjoining Pacific Plate, ending subduction and initiating horizontal shear movement between the plates, with the Pacific Plate moving northwesterly and the North American Plate moving in the opposite southeast direction. This transform movement began approximately 20 million years ago and the resultant shear lineation is the San Andreas Fault Zone. The Neenach Volcano was situated directly over the primary San Andreas fault, causing it to be split in two once the transform fault movement began. The average relative motion along the fault is about 1.5 cm per year, equivalent to six inches per decade. Over the course of this movement, the two halves of the volcano drifted about 195 miles (314 kilometers) apart and eroded down into the minor rock formations visible today.

== Pinnacles ==
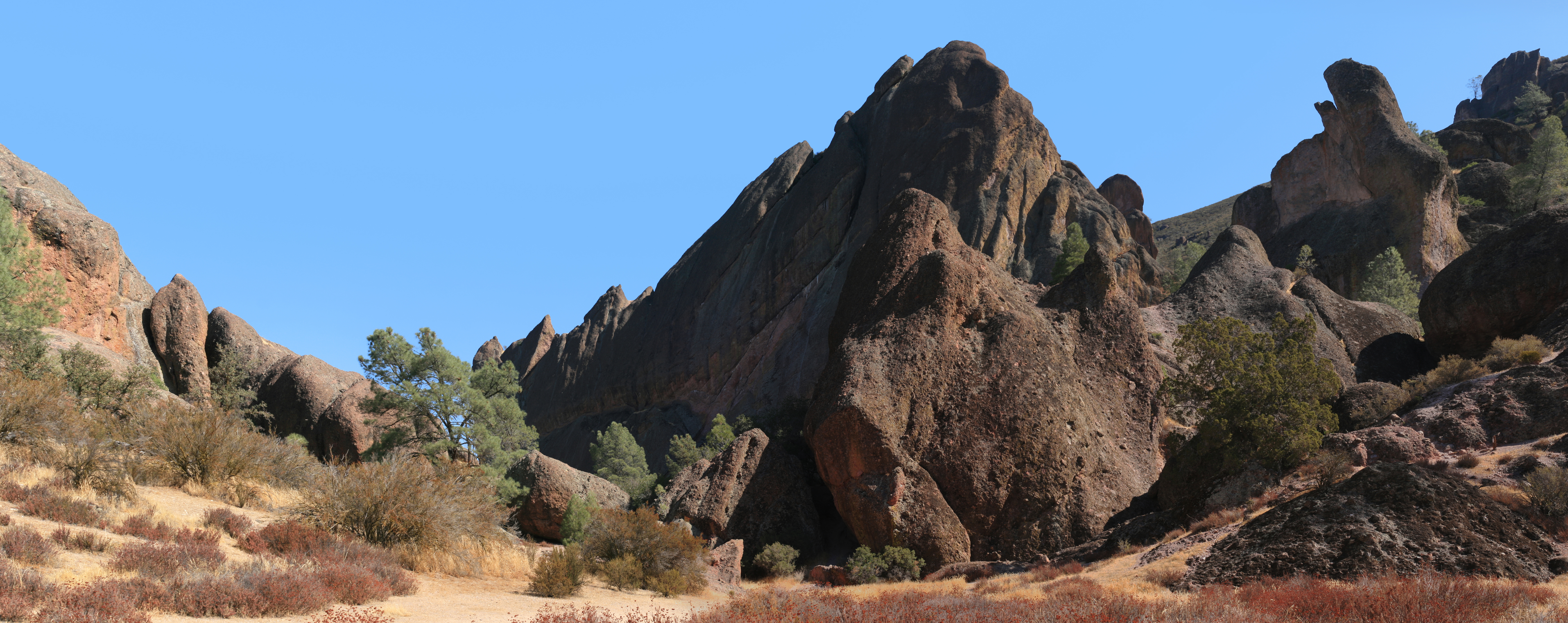
Rock formations at Pinnacles National Park.

The remnants of the western portion of the volcano are located in Pinnacles National Park (36°29′55.44″N 121°12′9.02″W). The most prominent outcrops in the park (High Peaks, Balconies, Machete Ridge and other notable, but unnamed megaliths) consist primarily of eroded pyroclastic flows or air falls, including volcanic breccia, rhyolitic lava flows and volcanic tuff. Remnant andesite lava flows or dikes are also present at a few locations in the park, including the Tourist Trap climbing area and along the West Fork Chalone Creek. The park encompasses roughly 42 square miles and the Neenach Volcanics represent about 20 square miles of the total.

== Neenach ==
Location in the Los Angeles Metropolitan Area

The remnants of the eastern portion of the volcano, called the Neenach Formation, lie about 195 miles (314 kilometers) south of the western portion near Neenach, California. (34°44′58.30″N 118°35′51.62″W). The formation covers about 10 square miles and is notable for the distinct and strongly linear boundary along its southerly side, where the San Andreas Fault split the original volcano. This entire southern boundary is accessible by Pine Canyon Road (Los Angeles County Route N2) between Sandberg and Three Points. Surface rock exposures in the formation appear to consist primarily of dacite and andesite flows, which have weathered into undistinguished low hills with few outcrops, unlike the dramatic megaliths in the northern portion. Satellite imagery reveals several areas of exposed rhyolitic tuff and lapilli tuff, a light green pyroclastic rock that also occurs in Pinnacles National Park and was used to construct the visitor center and other structures there. Although the entire formation appears to be on private property, a segment of the Pacific Crest Trail transects the Neenach from southwest to northeast, with trailheads at the intersection of Lancaster Road (California State Route 138) and 269th Street West and along Pine Canyon Road about 0.9 mile east of Horse Trail Campground, which is also on the PCT.
