= Double Arch (Utah) =

Natural arch in Utah, United States

- Rock arch
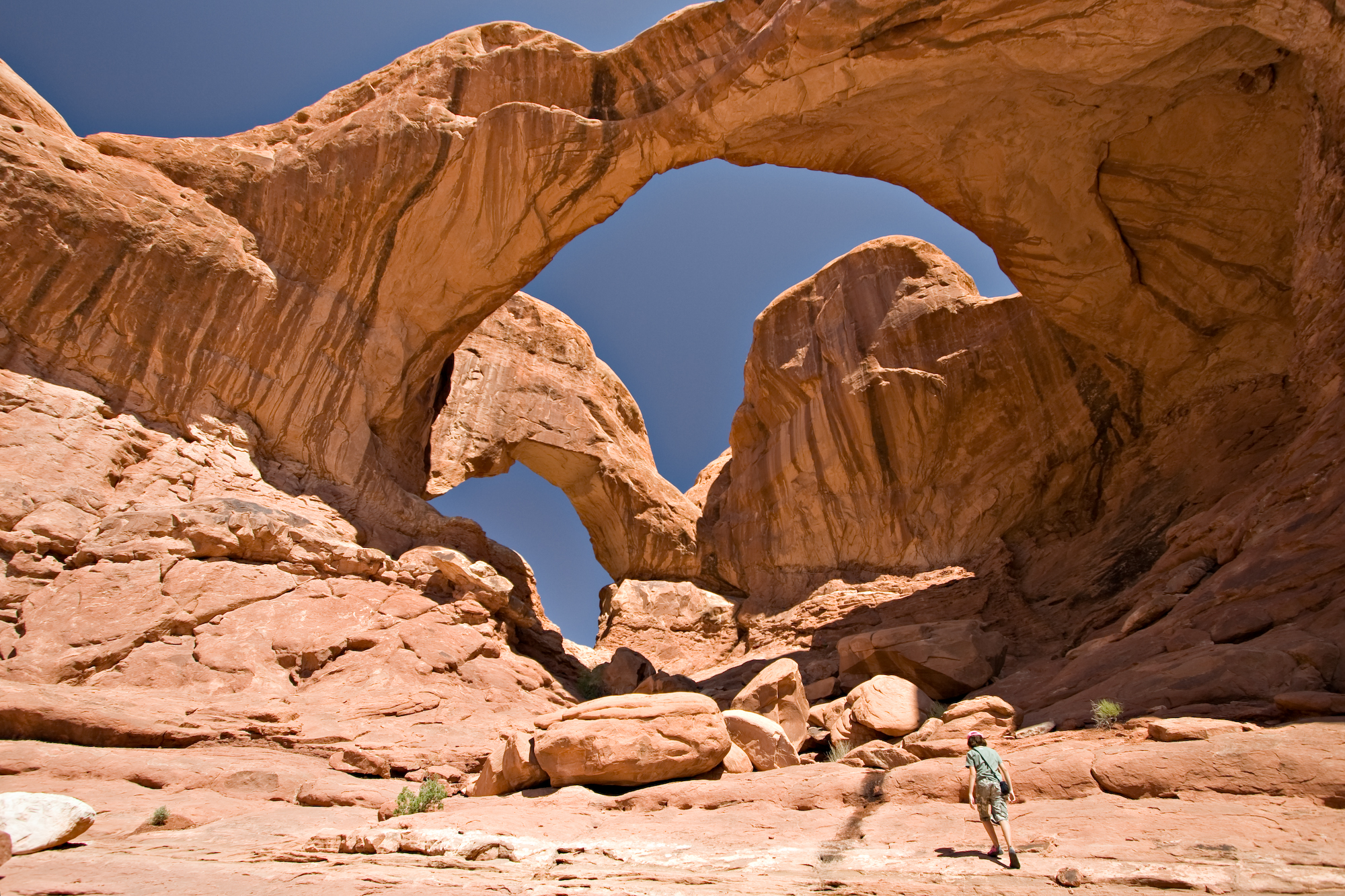
- View of Double Arch

- Location within Utah
- Coordinates: 38°41′30″N 109°32′26″W
- Location: Arches National Park, Utah, United States

Dimensions
  - Length: 144 ft (44 m)
  - Height: 112 ft (34 m)
- Elevation: 5,292 ft (1,613 m)

Double Arch is a close-set pair of natural arches in Arches National Park in southern Grand County, Utah, United States, that is one of the better known features of the park.

== Description ==
Double Arch was formed differently from most of the arches in the park. It is what is known as a pothole arch, formed by water erosion from above rather than more typical erosion from the side. The larger opening has a span of 148 feet (45 m) and a height of 104 feet (32 m). These dimensions give the arch the tallest opening and second-longest span in the park.

The area was used as a backdrop for the opening scene of Indiana Jones and the Last Crusade, in which the arches are briefly visible. However, the cave shown in the movie does not exist.

From the Double Arch parking area it is a 0.5-mile (0.80 km) round trip to the arches that may be wheelchair accessible, with assistance. No guardrails or fences prevent visitors from exploring directly beneath and through the arches.

== Gallery ==
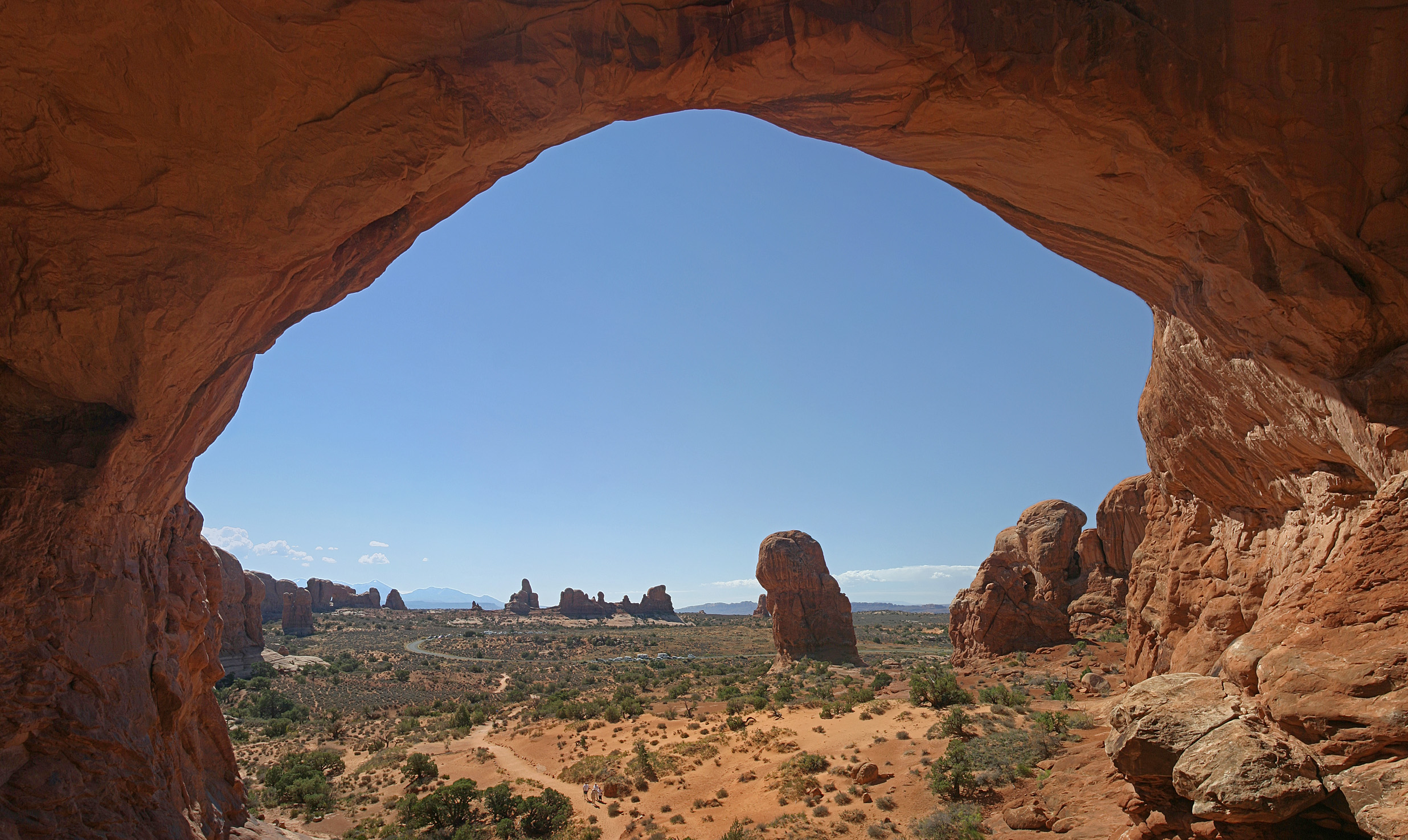
The view from inside Double Arch, September 2004

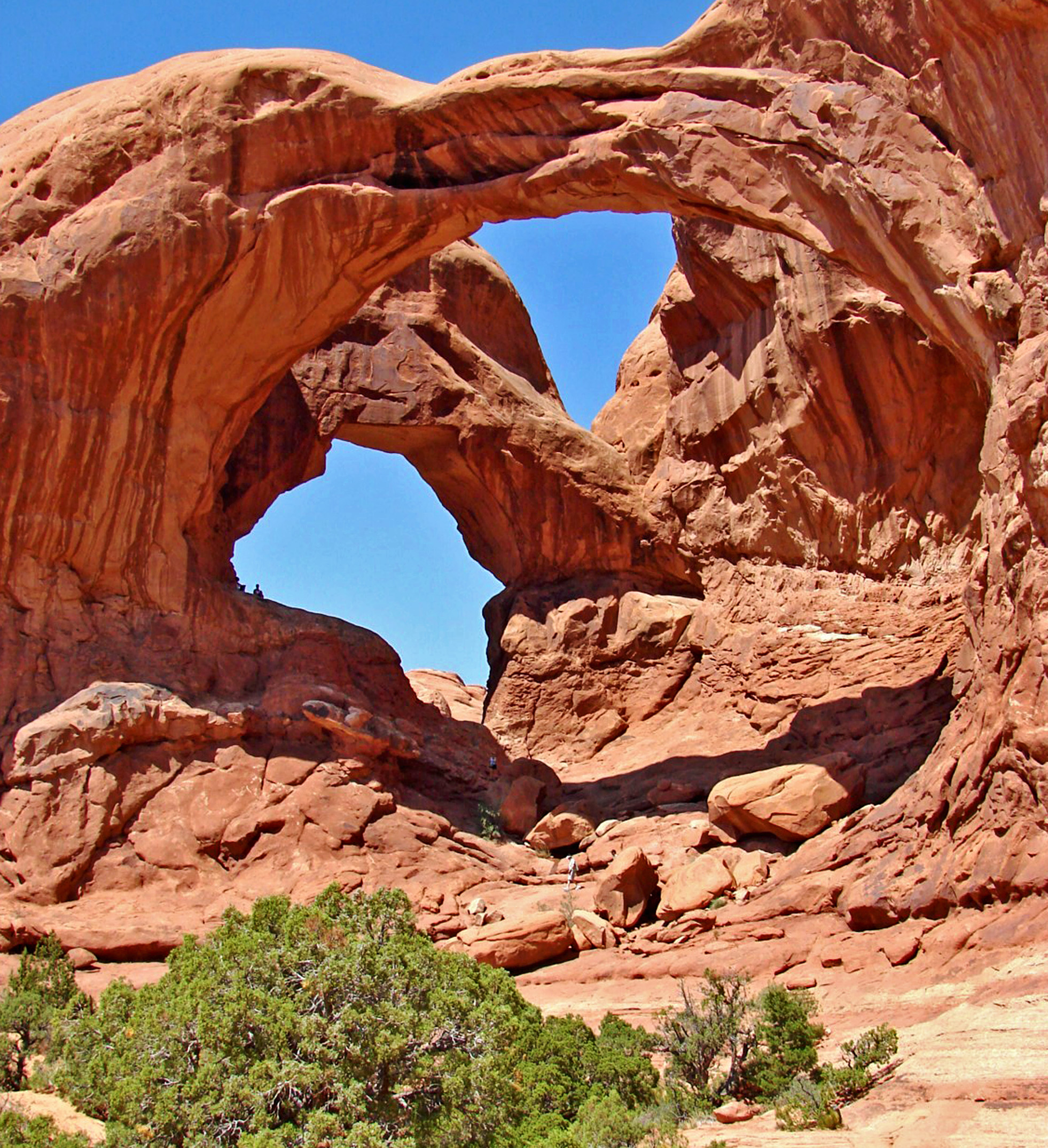
Double Arch, August 2012

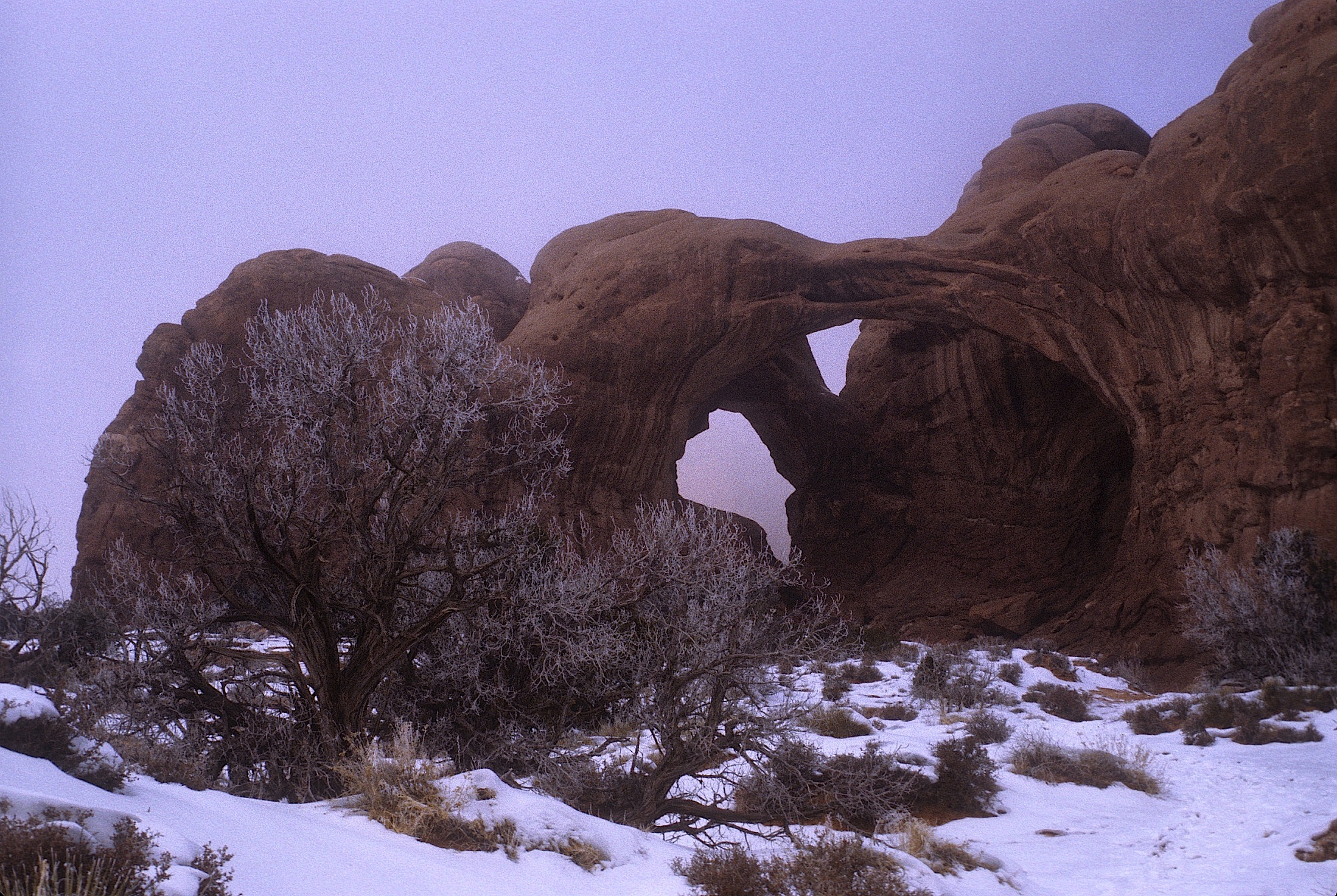
Double Arch in winter

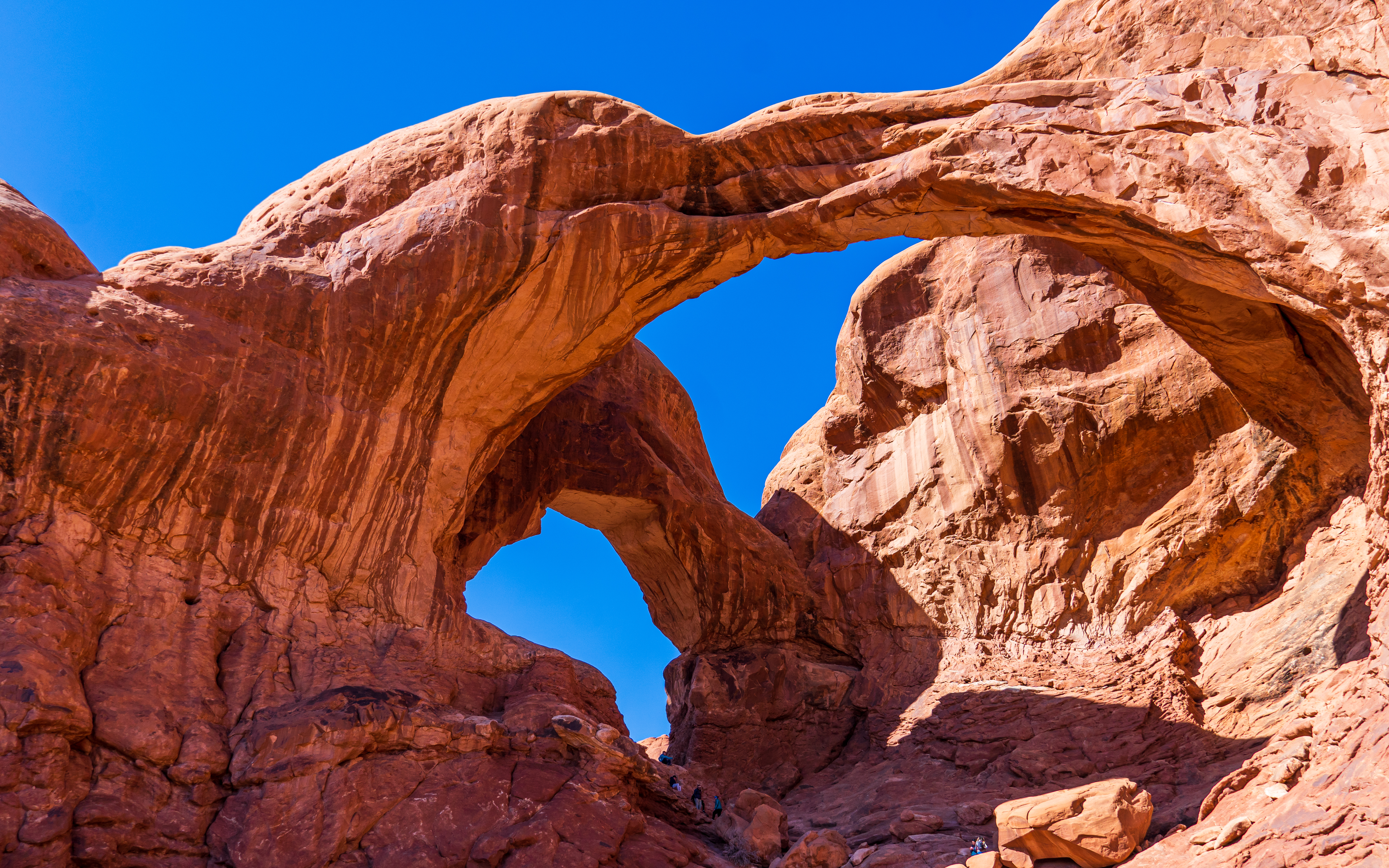
A view of Double Arch, in Arches National Park, Utah, USA near Moab, Utah
