= New Idria, California =

New Idria Idria
- Ghost town
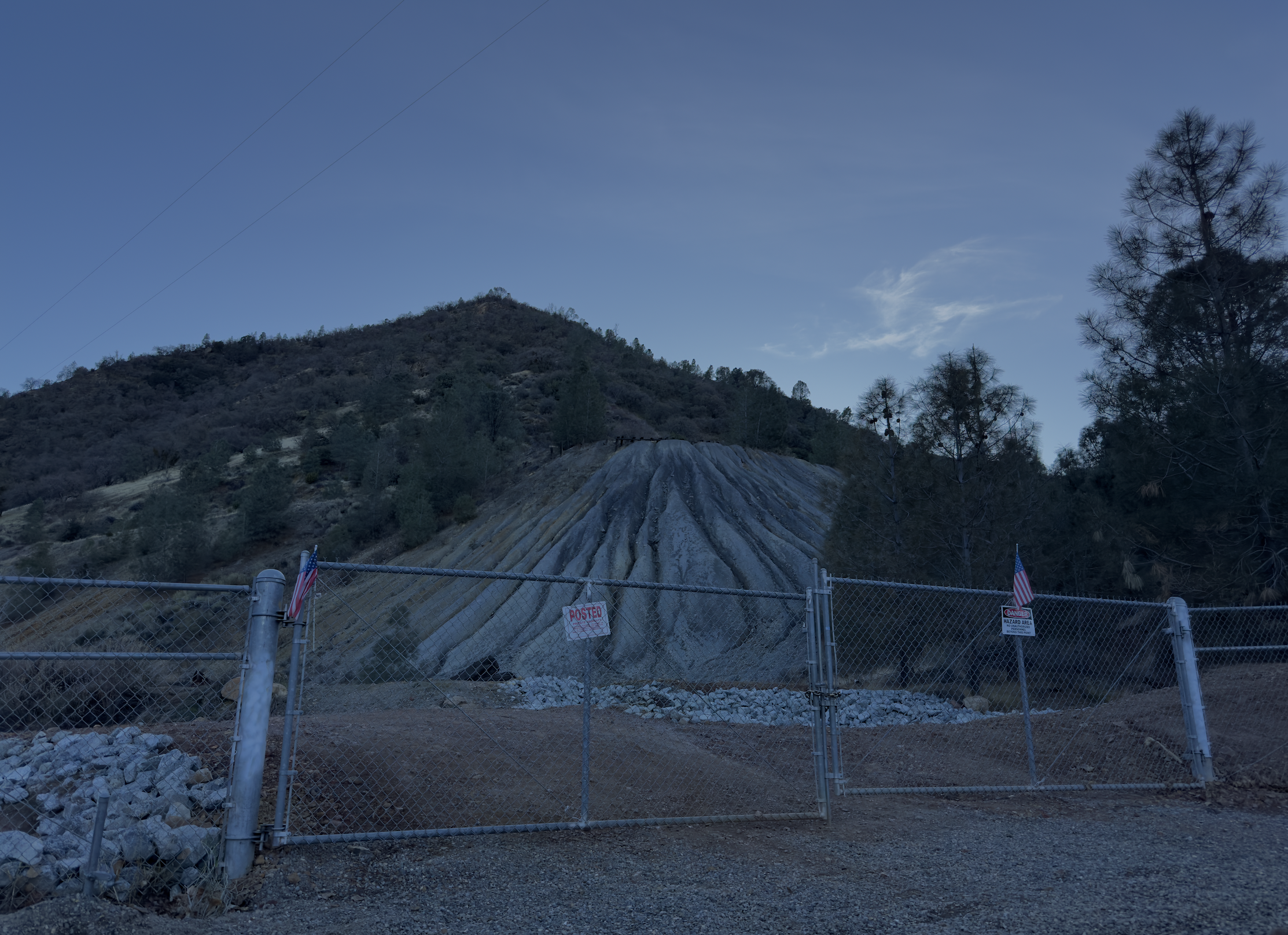
- New Idria in January 2025

- Location within the state of California New Idria (the United States)
- Coordinates: 36°25′1″N 120°40′28″W
- Country: United States
- State: California
- County: San Benito
- Elevation: 2,648 ft (807 m)
- Time zone: UTC−8 (Pacific)
  - Summer (DST): UTC−7 (PDT)
- ZIP codes: 95027 (discontinued)
- Area code: 831
- FIPS code: 06-36182
- GNIS feature ID: 1660786

California Historical Landmark
- Official name: New Idria Mine
- Reference no.: 324

New Idria was an unincorporated town in San Benito County, California, United States. It was named after the New Idria Mercury Mine, which closed in 1972, resulting in a ghost town.

== Geography ==
The area is served by Area code 831. It is included in the Monterey Bay Unified Air Pollution Control District and the Panoche Elementary School District. San Benito Mountain, elevation 5,241 feet (1,597 m), is located 3.6 miles (5.8 km) southeast. The nearest city is King City along U.S. Route 101.

The New Idria Mercury Mine was named in honor of the world's then second largest quicksilver mine in what was then Idria, Austria, now Idrija, Slovenia; (Slovene pronunciation [ĭdrija], California English pronunciation [īdria].) The town grew to support the mining operations, but the mine closed in the 1970s. The town is currently an abandoned ghost town with more than 100 standing buildings, though vandalism has contributed to their deterioration in recent years. According to the US Geological Survey, both Idria (primary) and New Idria (variant) are recognized for federal use in describing the community.

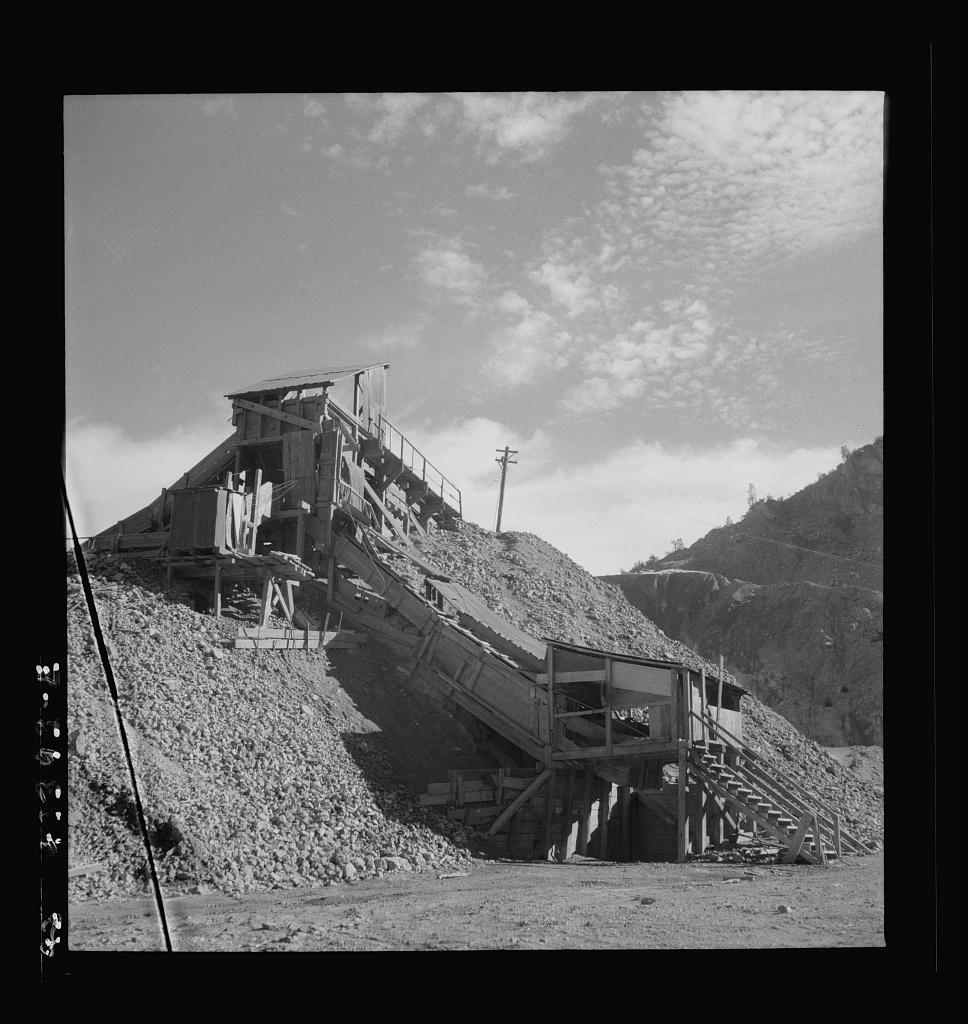
A part of a mercury extraction plant of the New Idria Quicksilver Mining Company

== History ==
The community was established to support the mine, which mainly extracted mercury, since cinnabar was abundant in the local rock formations. Mercury mining at the location began in 1854. At one time, the New Idria mines were America's second most productive mines, with the New Almaden mines in the vicinity of San Jose, about 82 miles (132 km) northwest, being the first.

The discovery of mercury ore at New Idria came soon after the discovery of gold in the Sierra foothills, which began the California gold rush. At that time, mercury was important in extracting gold from gold ore. Before the New Idria and New Almaden Quicksilver Mines, the mercury came almost exclusively from Europe.

The New Idria Mining Company was formed soon after the discovery of cinnabar (quicksilver ore) in the southern Diablo Range of central California in 1854. The town of New Idria began around 1857 and about 300 men were employed at the mine by 1861. The first school opened in 1867 and the New Idria Post Office opened in 1869, with Edward A. Morse as the first postmaster. In 1894, the New Idria Post Office dropped the word "New" and the town become known as Idria. The New Idria Quicksilver Mining Company closed in 1972.

In an 1871 report to the United States House of Representatives, the surveyor general of California, Sherman Day, noted "...that the country about the mine is a series of rough and precipitous mountains and hills, intersected by deep canons; that the greater portion of it is barren and unsuited for agricultural purposes; it is essentially a minieral region..."

On May 30, 1974, the town and surrounding 2,000 acres were auctioned by Wershow Auctioneers, in So. San Francisco.

The town has since become a ghost town.

The United States Postal Service operated a post office, going by the name Idria, with the ZIP Code 95027. The post office closed on January 2, 1974.

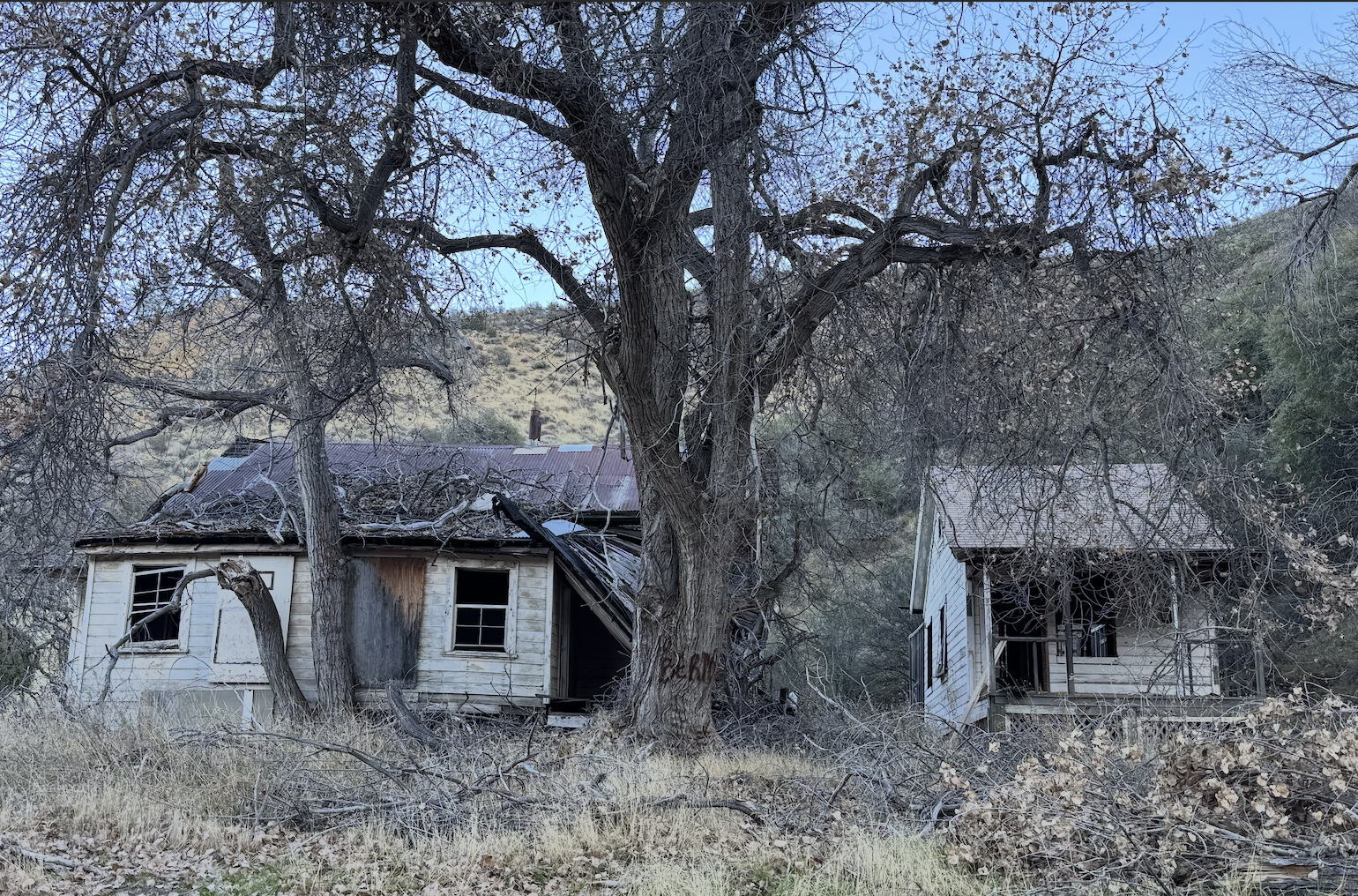
Old abandoned buildings in New Idria, CA Taken in January 2025

New Idria is a California Historical Landmark (#324) and home of the world's first Gould Rotary Furnace, which revolutionized ore processing technology worldwide.

On July 30, 2010, a fire destroyed 13 buildings on the north side of town.

Superfund Site

In 2011, New Idria was re-listed as a U.S. Environmental Protection Agency (EPA) Superfund site, owing to unchecked mercury run-off and contamination. As of June, 2012, the entire section of the former town site on the south side of New Idria/Clear Creek road is fenced-off.

== Environmental concerns in the area ==
The New Idria Mercury Mine was initially investigated in the 1990s by the EPA, for possible inclusion on the EPA's National Priorities List, but the site did not rank high enough at that time to be listed. A site reassessment was begun in 2002, and an expanded site assessment begun in 2009, which was concluded in October 2010. In March 2011, the EPA proposed New Idria to its National Priority List. Elevated levels of mercury were found downstream of the town, as well as significant levels of mercury and other heavy metals found within tailings piles on the site. The region has a long history of mining, with asbestos and chromium being mined in addition to mercury; the EPA's 2004 Risk Assessment for the nearby Clear Creek Management Area identified 86 separate abandoned mines in the vicinity. The natural rock formations in the area have been shedding asbestos-rich debris into stream valleys for millions of years The average New Idria rock contains 5-15% by volume short fiber asbestos. The 2010 edition of Rand McNally's The Road Atlas labels the area immediately south of New Idria as an "Asbestos Hazard Area".

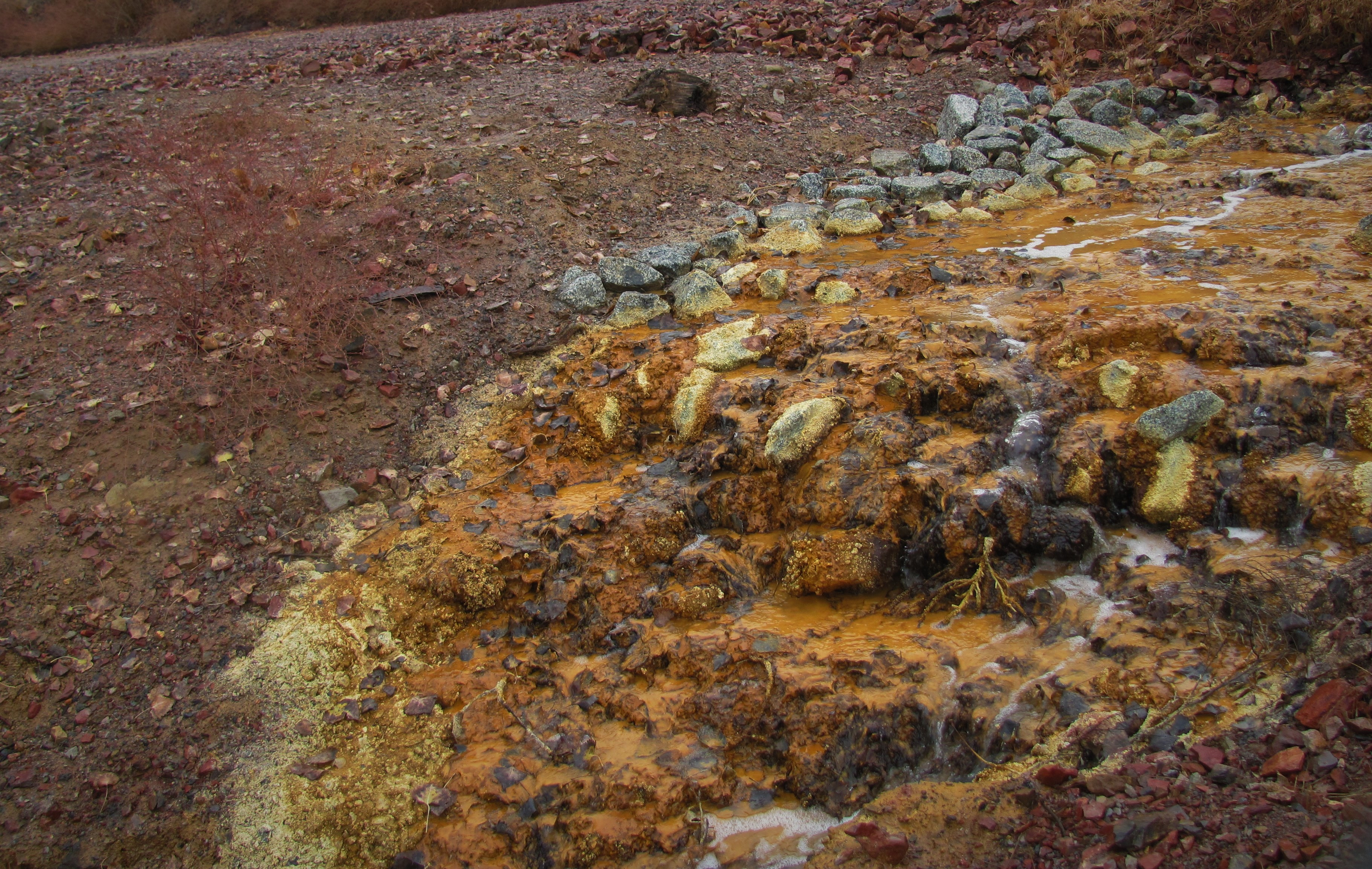
A polluted stream near the mine

== Mineral collecting ==
The New Idria Mining District is known for its abundance of rare minerals such as benitoite, named after the San Benito River. Gem quality benitoite is only found in this area of the world. New Idria is also home to serpentinite rock. Many thousands of tectonic events acting on the serpentinite have produced extensive deposits of short-fiber asbestos.

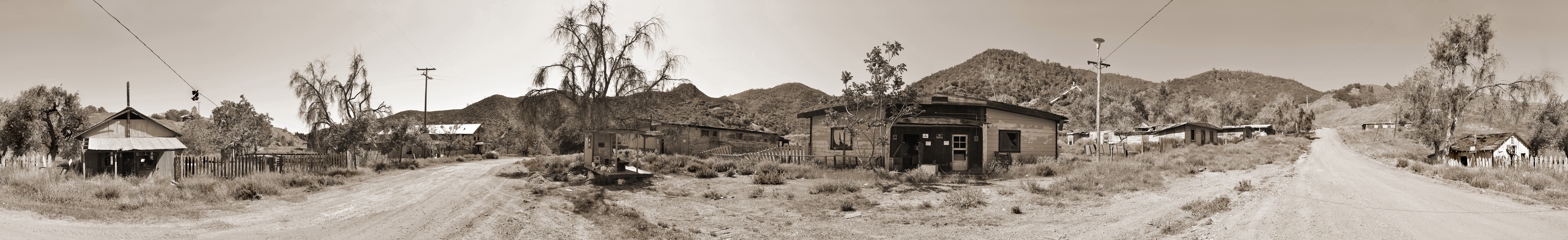
360° in the center of the New Idria ghost town.

== Climate ==
Climate data for Idria, California
Month	Jan	Feb	Mar	Apr	May	Jun	Jul	Aug	Sep	Oct	Nov	Dec	Year
Record high °F (°C)	83 (28)	85 (29)	90 (32)	94 (34)	99 (37)	111 (44)	113 (45)	112 (44)	111 (44)	96 (36)	87 (31)	86 (30)	113 (45)
Mean daily maximum °F (°C)	55.7 (13.2)	57.2 (14.0)	60.1 (15.6)	65.9 (18.8)	76.1 (24.5)	85.1 (29.5)	92.5 (33.6)	91.2 (32.9)	85.1 (29.5)	75.4 (24.1)	59.7 (15.4)	55.5 (13.1)	71.6 (22.0)
Mean daily minimum °F (°C)	37.2 (2.9)	38.5 (3.6)	39.5 (4.2)	43.7 (6.5)	49.8 (9.9)	57.6 (14.2)	64.9 (18.3)	64.4 (18.0)	58.6 (14.8)	51.1 (10.6)	41.0 (5.0)	37.1 (2.8)	48.6 (9.2)
Record low °F (°C)	14 (−10)	18 (−8)	18 (−8)	21 (−6)	30 (−1)	34 (1)	40 (4)	41 (5)	36 (2)	29 (−2)	21 (−6)	14 (−10)	14 (−10)
Average precipitation inches (mm)	2.77 (70)	2.96 (75)	2.42 (61)	1.36 (35)	0.44 (11)	0.06 (1.5)	0.02 (0.51)	0.07 (1.8)	0.22 (5.6)	0.58 (15)	1.63 (41)	2.65 (67)	15.18 (384.41)
Average snowfall inches (cm)	0.1 (0.25)	0.0 (0.0)	0.3 (0.76)	0.0 (0.0)	0.0 (0.0)	0.0 (0.0)	0.0 (0.0)	0.0 (0.0)	0.0 (0.0)	0.0 (0.0)	0.0 (0.0)	0.0 (0.0)	0.4 (1.01)
Source: WRCC

== See also ==
- New Idria Mercury Mine
- Mercey Hot Springs, California
- Paicines, California
- Panoche, California
- State Route 25
- San Benito Mountain
