= California State Route 25 =

Highway in California

State Route 25

- SR 25 highlighted in red

Route information
- Maintained by Caltrans
- Length: 74.632 mi (120.109 km)

Major junctions
- South end: SR 198 near Priest Valley
- SR 146 near Pinnacles; SR 156 near Hollister
- North end: US 101 near Gilroy

Location
- Country: United States
- State: California
- Counties: Monterey, San Benito, Santa Clara

Highway system
- State highways in California; Interstate; US; State; Scenic; History; Pre‑1964; Unconstructed; Deleted; Freeways
← SR 24	→ SR 26

State Route 25 (SR 25) is a state highway in the U.S. state of California between State Route 198 in Monterey County and U.S. Route 101 in Santa Clara south of Gilroy. For most of its length, SR 25 runs through the center of San Benito County.

== Route description ==
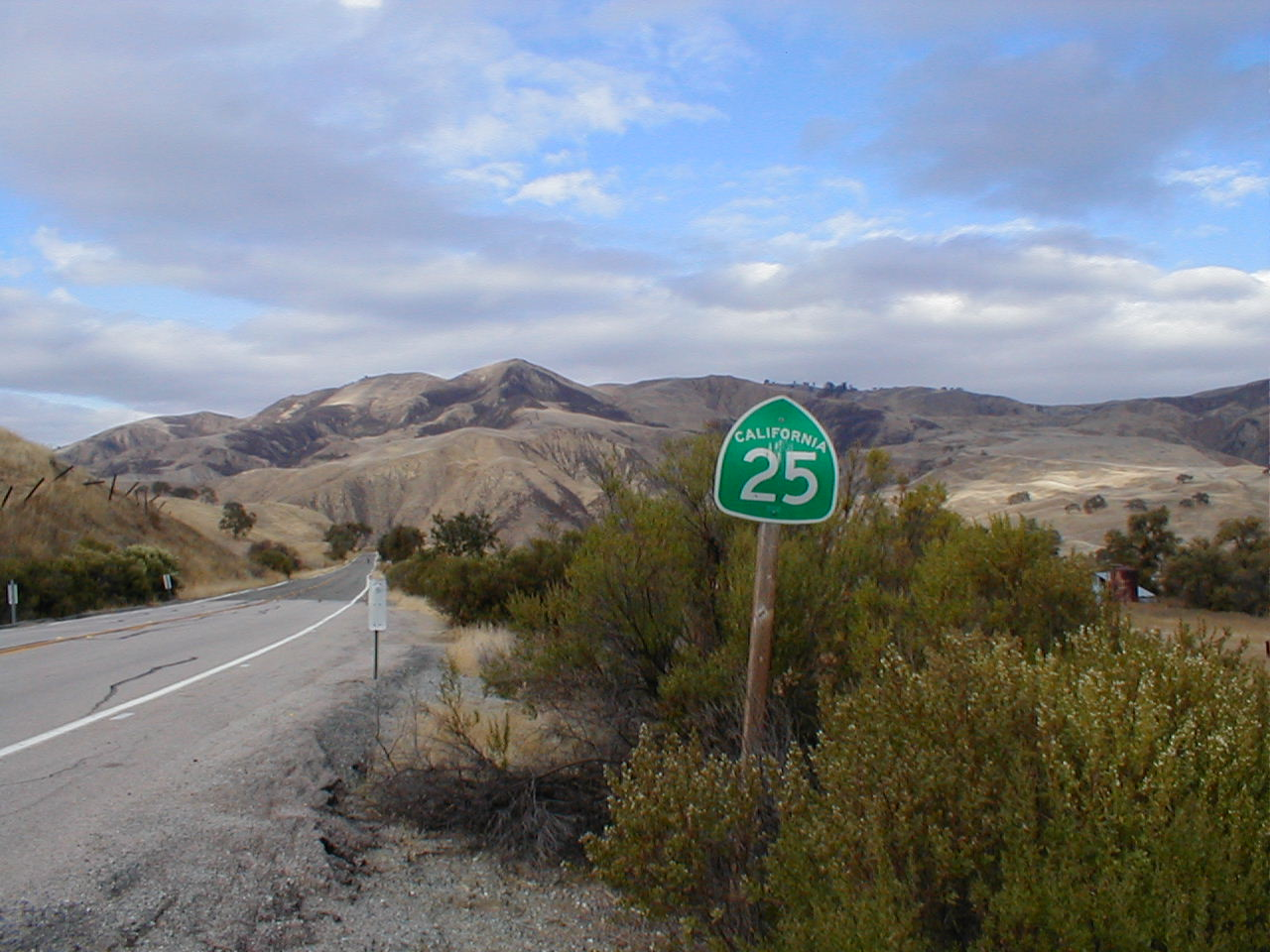
Looking north along SR 25 in San Benito County, California

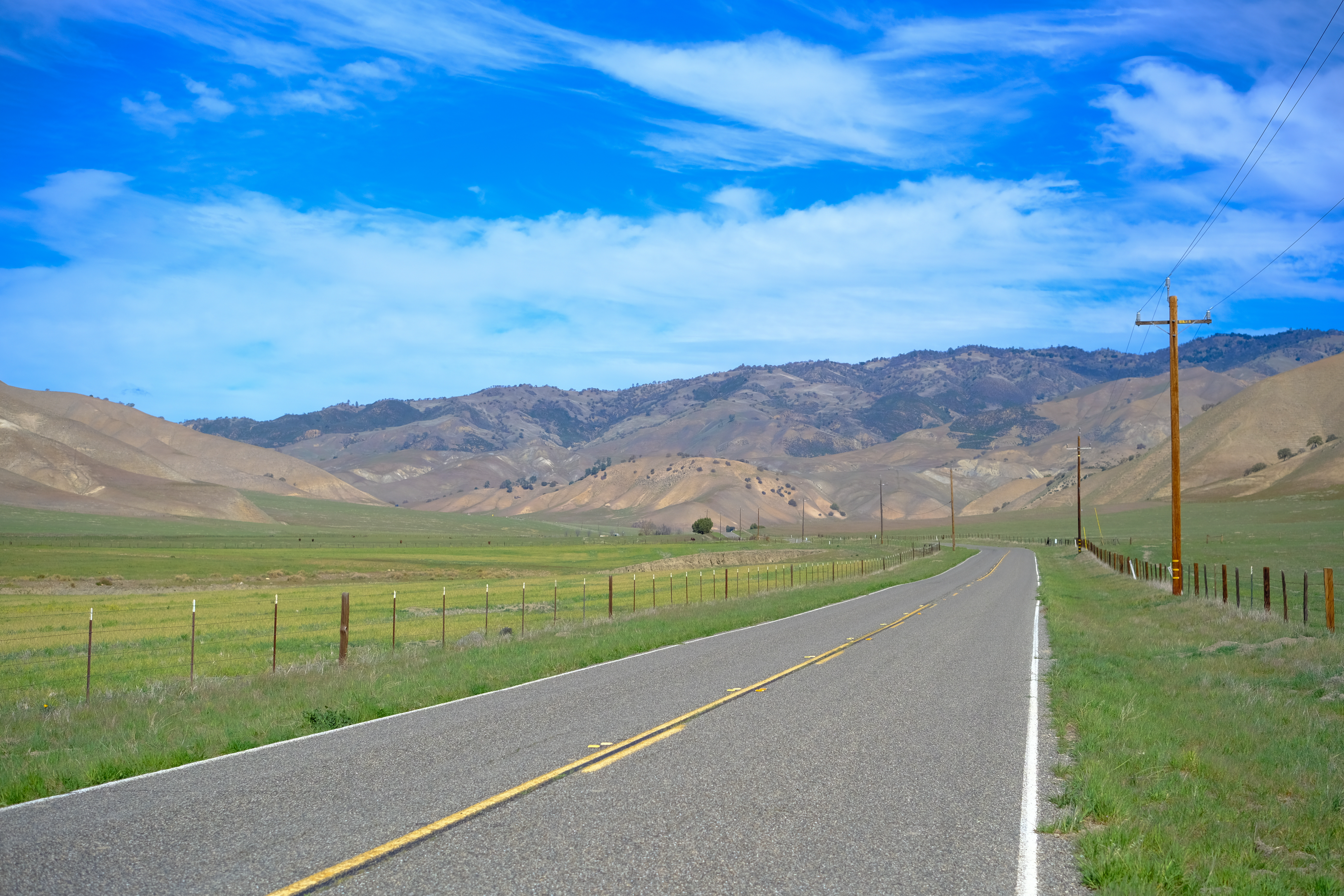
View of SR 25

Route 25 is defined in section 325, subdivision (a), of the California Streets and Highways Code, and that the highway is "from Route 198 to Route 101 near Gilroy". Subdivision (b), last amended in 2013, permits the state to relinquish control of the now-former segment of the highway through Downtown Hollister to the city.

SR 25 (also known as Bolsa Road and the Airline Highway) begins at the intersection of Peach Tree Road and State Route 198 about 11 miles west of Priest Valley, in Monterey County, and is the northern extension of Peach Tree Road. It heads northwest, crossing into San Benito County and passing through the community of Bitterwater. SR 25 provides access to the Pinnacles National Park east entrance, running parallel to the San Andreas Fault. Running parallel to the Gabilan Range and Diablo Range, SR 25 passes through the communities of Paicines and Tres Pinos before reaching the city of Hollister.

Upon reaching Hollister, the route turns into a four-lane undivided road, curving north and west through the east side of the city. North of Hollister, SR 25 reverts into a 2-lane road and continues northwest from Hollister, intersecting with State Route 156. From there, the route is a partially divided road until just short of a railroad crossing and eventually crossing the Pajaro River into Santa Clara County. The route then heads northwest, and at the intersection with Bloomfield Avenue, the route then curves west before its northern terminus at U.S. Route 101 south of Gilroy.

SR 25 is part of the California Freeway and Expressway System, and a small portion near Hollister is part of the National Highway System, a network of highways that are considered essential to the country's economy, defense, and mobility by the Federal Highway Administration. SR 25 is eligible to be included in the State Scenic Highway System, but it is not officially designated as a scenic highway by the California Department of Transportation.

== History ==
The Airline Highway Association was organized in 1933-4 and was composed of representatives of Alameda, Santa Clara, San Benito, Kern and Kings Counties. Its purpose was to establish this "Airline Highway". In the Oakland Tribune article, (Tues. June 19, 1934 page 5. "NEW AIRLINE, HIGHWAY TO L.A. PLANNED") it states "the highway would follow the air line between the northern and southern part of the state as closely as possible". The use of the word Airline is confusing as we associate it with modern-day transportation. In this sense it is defined as an Americanism dating back to 1805 meaning "traveling a direct route".

SR 25 originally ran through Downtown Hollister along Tres Pinos Road, Nash Road, San Benito Street, and San Felipe Road. A bypass was first proposed in 1959, but was debated for decades. Additional funding was provided by Measure A, passed by San Benito County voters in 1988, increasing the county sales tax to help fund various transportation projects. After extensive environmental reviews, the eastern bypass, running north from the Sunnyslope/Tres Pinos Road intersection to the Bolsa/San Felipe Road intersection, broke ground in 2007 and opened one year later.

== Major intersections ==
Except where prefixed with a letter, postmiles were measured on the road as it was in 1964, based on the alignment that existed at the time, and do not necessarily reflect current mileage. Postmile prefixes include: R reflecting a realignment in the route since then, M indicating a second realignment, L referring to an overlap due to a correction or change, and T indicating postmiles classified as temporary. Segments that remain unconstructed or have been relinquished to local control may be omitted. The numbers reset at county lines; the start and end postmiles in each county are given in the county column.

County	Location	Postmile	Destinations	Notes
Monterey; MON 0.00-11.75		0.00	SR 198 – Coalinga, San Lucas	South end of SR 25
San Benito; SBT 0.00-60.08	Bitterwater		King City Road (CR G13) – King City	Northern terminus of CR G13
San Benito; SBT 0.00-60.08		21.47	SR 146 – Pinnacles National Park	Eastern terminus of SR 146 eastern segment
San Benito; SBT 0.00-60.08	Paicines	39.53	CR J1 (Panoche Road) – Panoche, Idria	Western terminus of CR J1
San Benito; SBT 0.00-60.08	Hollister	49.95	Tres Pinos Road, Sunnyslope Road	Tres Pinos Road is former SR 25 north
San Benito; SBT 0.00-60.08	Hollister	L52.23 51.45	SR 156 Bus. (San Felipe Road) – Los Banos, Hollister	Former SR 25 south / SR 156
San Benito; SBT 0.00-60.08		54.05	SR 156 – Los Banos, San Juan Bautista	Converted to a turbo roundabout in 2024
Santa Clara; SCL 0.00-2.56			CR G7 (Bloomfield Avenue)	Eastern terminus of CR G7
Santa Clara; SCL 0.00-2.56		2.56	US 101 – Gilroy, Salinas	Interchange; north end of SR 25; US 101 exit 353
1.000 mi = 1.609 km; 1.000 km = 0.621 mi
