= California State Route 146 =

Highway in California

State Route 146
- SR 146 highlighted in red; the gap represents the unofficial segments in Pinnacles National Park as well as the unconstructed segment in the center of the park

Route information
- Maintained by Caltrans
- Length: 12.632 mi (20.329 km) SR 146 is broken into pieces due to a gap in the description, unfilled by any route.

Section 1
- West end: US 101 near Soledad
- East end: Pinnacles National Park west boundary

Section 2
- West end: Pinnacles National Park east boundary
- East end: SR 25 near Paicines

Location
- Country: United States
- State: California
- Counties: Monterey, San Benito

Highway system
- State highways in California; Interstate; US; State; Scenic; History; Pre‑1964; Unconstructed; Deleted; Freeways
← SR 145	→ SR 147

State Route 146 (SR 146) is a state highway in the U.S. state of California in Monterey and San Benito Counties. The route serves as an entryway to Pinnacles National Park, located in the Gabilan Mountains, from both U.S. Route 101 in the Salinas Valley on the west and State Route 25 near Paicines on the east. The route is broken into two sections and cannot be used to completely pass through Pinnacles National Park.

== Route description ==
Route 146 is divided into two sections and does not provide a continuous vehicular route through Pinnacles National Park. This is reflected in the route's definition in section 446, subdivision (a), of the California Streets and Highways Code:

Route 145 is from:
(1) Route 101 near Soledad to Pinnacles National Monument.
(2) Pinnacles National Monument to Route 25 in Bear Valley.

The definition has not yet been corrected to reflect Pinnacles being re-designated as a national park in 2013. In addition, subdivision (b) permits the state to relinquish control of the highway to local jurisdictions.

The western part of Route 146 passes from U.S. Route 101 near Soledad along Metz Road and Shirttail Canyon Road to the west area of Pinnacles. The eastern portion runs into the east area of Pinnacles from State Route 25 along Pinnacles Road. Inside the park, the route is federally maintained and is not included in the state route logs.

SR 146 is not part of the National Highway System, a network of highways that are considered essential to the country's economy, defense, and mobility by the Federal Highway Administration. SR 146 is eligible for the State Scenic Highway System, but it is not officially designated as a scenic highway by the California Department of Transportation.

== History ==
According to the National Park Service, Pinnacles has been administered as a wilderness area as long as that unit has been under their jurisdiction, and NPS sources contacted during research cannot recall any time when Route 146 proceeded through the park unbroken.

== Major intersections ==
Except where prefixed with a letter, postmiles were measured on the road as it was in 1964, based on the alignment that existed at the time, and do not necessarily reflect current mileage. Postmile prefixes include: R reflecting a realignment in the route since then, M indicating a second realignment, L referring to an overlap due to a correction or change, and T indicating postmiles classified as temporary. Segments that remain unconstructed or have been relinquished to local control may be omitted. The numbers reset at county lines; the start and end postmiles in each county are given in the county column.

County	Location	Postmile	Destinations	Notes
Monterey; MON 0.00-10.08	Soledad	0.00	US 101 – San Francisco, Los Angeles	Interchange; west end of SR 146; US 101 exit 302
Monterey; MON 0.00-10.08	Soledad	0.55	Monterey Street	
Monterey; MON 0.00-10.08		3.48	CR G15 (Metz Road) – King City	
San Benito; SBT 10.08-15.15	Pinnacles National Park	10.19	East end of state maintenance at western park boundary	
San Benito; SBT 10.08-15.15	Pinnacles National Park		West entrance station; park fee or pass required for entry	
San Benito; SBT 10.08-15.15	Pinnacles National Park		Chaparral Trailhead	East end of western segment of route
San Benito; SBT 10.08-15.15	Pinnacles National Park	Gap in route; no passable road through park		
San Benito; SBT 10.08-15.15	Pinnacles National Park		Old Pinnacles Trailhead	West end of eastern segment of route
San Benito; SBT 10.08-15.15	Pinnacles National Park		East entrance station; park fee or pass required for entry	
San Benito; SBT 10.08-15.15	Pinnacles National Park	12.71	West end of state maintenance at eastern park boundary	
San Benito; SBT 10.08-15.15		15.15	SR 25 – Hollister, King City, Coalinga	East end of SR 146
1.000 mi = 1.609 km; 1.000 km = 0.621 mi: Tolled
