= CA-25 =

CA-25 may refer to:

- California's 25th congressional district
- California State Route 25
- USS Salt Lake City (CA-25), a World War II heavy cruiser
