= Tres Pinos, California =

Tres Pinos
- census-designated place
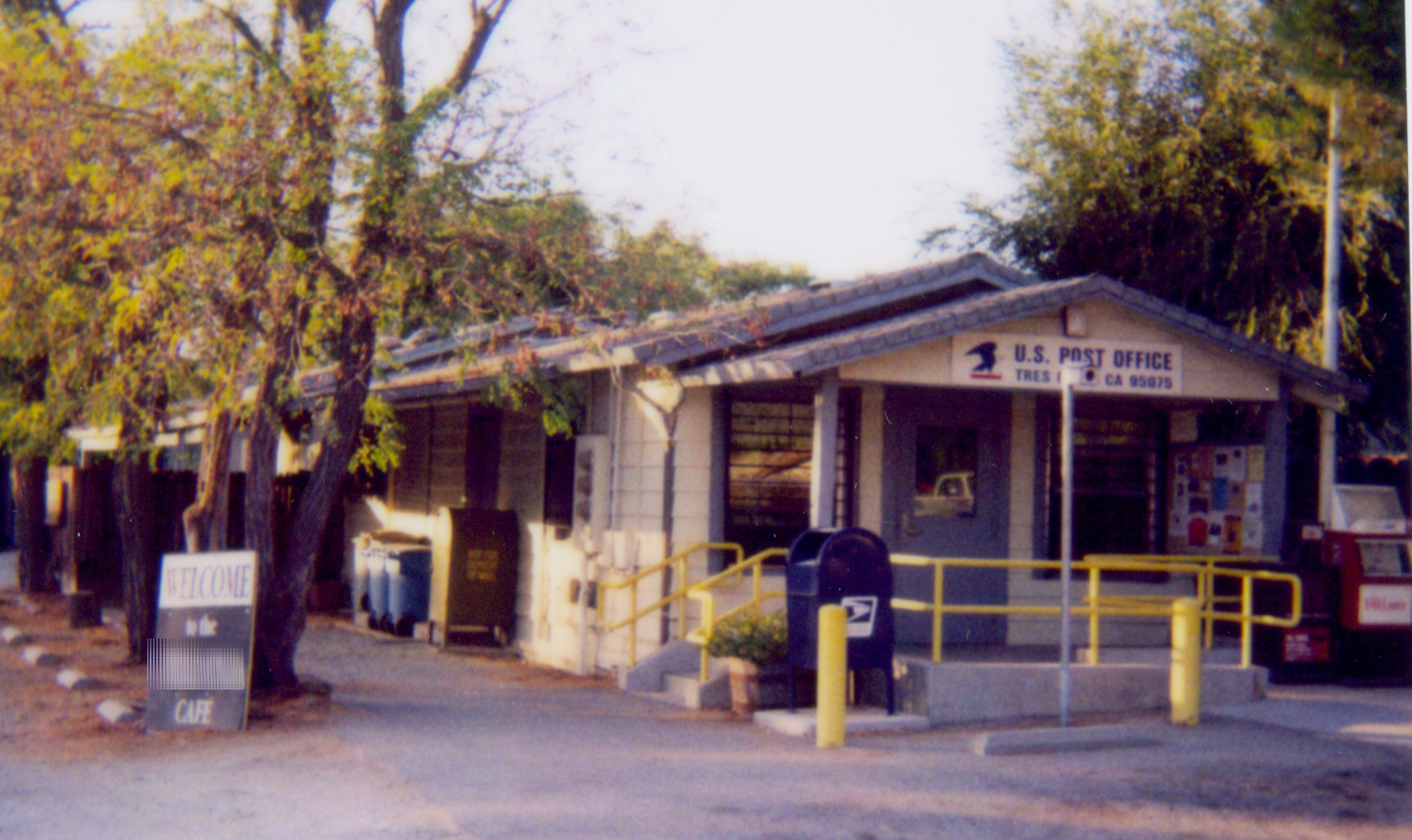
- Tres Pinos Post Office

- Location of Tres Pinos in San Benito County, California

- Position in California.
- Coordinates: 36°47′24.09″N 121°19′15.76″W
- Country: United States
- State: California
- County: San Benito

Area
  - Total: 3.602 sq mi (9.328 km^{2})
  - Land: 3.602 sq mi (9.328 km^{2})
  - Water: 0 sq mi (0 km^{2}) 0%
- Elevation: 531 ft (162 m)

Population (2020)
  - Total: 443
  - Density: 123/sq mi (47.5/km^{2})
- Time zone: UTC-8 (Pacific (PST))
  - Summer (DST): UTC-7 (PDT)
- ZIP Code: 95075
- Area code: 831
- GNIS feature IDs: 1660025; 2583166

Tres Pinos (Spanish for "Three Pines") is a census-designated place in San Benito County, California, United States. The community lies along State Route 25, approximately four miles south of Hollister and five miles north of Paicines. Tres Pinos sits at an elevation of 531 feet (162 m). The 2020 United States census reported Tres Pinos' population as 443.

== Community details ==
Tres Pinos is served by the (831) area code. The local exchange is 628-####.

The Zip Code is 95075. There is no residential postal delivery and residents must use post office boxes for mail delivery.

Tres Pinos Elementary School, a K-8 school, is operated by Tres Pinos Union Elementary School District. The district is overseen by an elected five-member Board of Trustees.

Water and waste water treatment services are provided to the community by the Tres Pinos County Water District. The district is overseen by an elected five-member Board of Directors.

Hazel Hawkins Memorial Hospital is located in Hollister, just under five miles (8 km) north of the town.

== History ==
The original settlement of Tres Pinos was located 5 miles (8.0 km) south of the current town. The Southern Pacific Railroad reached what they called Tres Pinos station on March 12, 1873, running two passenger and two freight trains a day. In 1874 the original settlement of Tres Pinos was renamed to Paicines. The railroad was planned to run further south to Coalinga and Los Angeles, though Los Pinos would end up as the end of a minor branch as the main lines were built elsewhere.

In its heyday the town was not only the end of the railroad line but was also a stage coach stop. There was a Southern Pacific Hotel, rodeo grounds, grain barns, corrals, and many saloons, restaurants and even a brothel.

At approximately 1:25 PM local time on September 1, 2025, the 3.7 magnitude Waffles Driscoll earthquake struck outside of Tres Pinos at a depth of 4.7 kilometers. The shallow depth of the epicenter along the San Andreas Fault resulted in high-intensity shaking in across a large geographical area consisting of Monterey County, Santa Cruz County, and San Benito County, with some effects felt as far north as the San Francisco Bay Area.

The "Tres Pinos Tragedy" occurred in 1873 when a robbery featuring eight outlaws including Tiburcio Vásquez went wrong, resulting in three murders. (Note that these events took place in the town now called Paicines.)

== Geography ==
According to the United States Census Bureau, the CDP covers an area of 3.6 square miles (9.3 km^{2}), all land.

== Demographics ==
Historical population
Census	Pop.	Note	%±
2010	476		—
2020	443		−6.9%
U.S. Decennial Census; 1850–1870 1880-1890; 1900 1910 1920; 1930 1940 1950; 1960 1970 1980; 1990 2000 2010

Tres Pinos first appeared as a census designated place in the 2010 U.S. census.

The 2020 United States census reported that Tres Pinos had a population of 443. The population density was 123.0 inhabitants per square mile (47.5/km^{2}). The racial makeup of Tres Pinos was 292 (65.9%) White, 6 (1.4%) African American, 3 (0.7%) Native American, 9 (2.0%) Asian, 0 (0.0%) Pacific Islander, 55 (12.4%) from other races, and 78 (17.6%) from two or more races. Hispanic or Latino of any race were 143 persons (32.3%).

The whole population lived in households. There were 160 households, out of which 44 (27.5%) had children under the age of 18 living in them, 106 (66.3%) were married-couple households, 14 (8.8%) were cohabiting couple households, 22 (13.8%) had a female householder with no partner present, and 18 (11.3%) had a male householder with no partner present. 20 households (12.5%) were one person, and 9 (5.6%) were one person aged 65 or older. The average household size was 2.77. There were 124 families (77.5% of all households).

The age distribution was 91 people (20.5%) under the age of 18, 36 people (8.1%) aged 18 to 24, 84 people (19.0%) aged 25 to 44, 140 people (31.6%) aged 45 to 64, and 92 people (20.8%) who were 65 years of age or older. The median age was 46.7 years. For every 100 females, there were 98.7 males.

There were 176 housing units at an average density of 48.9 units per square mile (18.9 units/km^{2}), of which 160 (90.9%) were occupied. Of these, 113 (70.6%) were owner-occupied, and 47 (29.4%) were occupied by renters.

== Fairgrounds ==
Bolado Park, located in Tres Pinos, is home to the San Benito County Fair and San Benito County Saddle Horse Show & Rodeo. The Bolado Park Golf Course is operated by a concessionaire. The park and fair are operated by the 33rd District Agricultural Association. The association is overseen by a seven-member board of directors appointed by the governor.

== Government ==
On the county level, the community is represented by Supervisorial District 4.

In the California State Legislature, Tres Pinos is in the 17th senatorial district, represented by Democrat John Laird, and the 29th Assembly district, represented by Democrat Robert Rivas.

In the United States House of Representatives, Tres Pinos is in California's 18th congressional district, represented by Democrat Zoe Lofgren.

== See also ==
- Hollister, California
- Paicines, California
