= California State Route 183 =

Highway in California

State Route 183

- Map of Monterey County in western California with SR 183 highlighted in red

Route information
- Maintained by Caltrans
- Length: 10.969 mi (17.653 km)

Major junctions
- South end: US 101 in Salinas
- SR 156 in Castroville
- North end: SR 1 in Castroville

Location
- Country: United States
- State: California
- County: Monterey

Highway system
- State highways in California; Interstate; US; State; Scenic; History; Pre‑1964; Unconstructed; Deleted; Freeways
← SR 182	→ SR 184

State Route 183 (SR 183) is a state highway in the U.S. state of California, entirely in Monterey County, running from U.S. Route 101 in Salinas to State Route 1 in Castroville.

== Route description ==
Route 183 is defined in section 483, subsection (a) of the California Streets and Highways Code, and that the highway is "from Route 101 in the City of Salinas to Route 1 near Castroville". Subdivision (b) permits the state to relinquish control of the segment of the highway within Salinas to the city.

SR 183 begins in the center of the city of Salinas at an at-grade interchange with U.S. Route 101. The road then heads toward the center of Salinas along North Main Street before abruptly turning northwest along Castroville Road. Following an interchange with Davis Road, the route exits town and enters an area covered with farmland. It continues through this central Monterey County while gradually turning north until it reaches southern Castroville, where it again turns northeast. The road then interchanges with State Route 156 and traverses northeast as the western boundary of Castroville before meeting its northern terminus, State Route 1, the Cabrillo Highway.

SR 183 is part of the California Freeway and Expressway System, and in Salinas is part of the National Highway System, a network of highways that are considered essential to the country's economy, defense, and mobility by the Federal Highway Administration.

== History ==
This route was defined in 1933. It appears to have been unsigned before 1964.

The California State Legislature passed Senate Bill 1459 in 2020, allowing the state to relinquish control of the segment of SR 183 within the City of Salinas to the city.

== Major intersections ==
Except where prefixed with a letter, postmiles were measured on the road as it was in 1964, based on the alignment that existed at the time, and do not necessarily reflect current mileage. Postmile prefixes include: R reflecting a realignment in the route since then, M indicating a second realignment, L referring to an overlap due to a correction or change, and T indicating postmiles classified as temporary. Segments that remain unconstructed or have been relinquished to local control may be omitted. The entire route is in Monterey County.

Location	Postmile	Destinations	Notes
Salinas	0.00	North Main Street	Continuation beyond US 101
Salinas	0.00	US 101 north – San Jose, San Francisco	Interchange; southbound exit and northbound entrance; south end of SR 183; south end of US 101 Bus. overlap; US 101 south exit 329
Salinas		US 101 Bus. south (Salinas Street) / Market Street to US 101 south	North end of US 101 Bus. overlap
Salinas	R1.96	Davis Road to US 101	Interchange
Castroville	9.01	SR 156 to US 101 / SR 1 south – Monterey	Interchange
Castroville	9.98	SR 1 north – Santa Cruz	North end of SR 183; no left turn to SR 1 south
1.000 mi = 1.609 km; 1.000 km = 0.621 mi: Concurrency terminus; Incomplete access
