= California State Route 156 =

Highway in California

State Route 156

- Map of western California with SR 156 highlighted in red

Route information
- Maintained by Caltrans
- Length: 25 mi (40 km) (includes 9 miles on US 101)
- Tourist routes: SR 156 between the Castroville city limit and US 101 in Prunedale

Major junctions
- West end: SR 1 near Castroville
- SR 183 in Castroville; US 101 from Prunedale to near San Juan Bautista; SR 25 in Hollister
- East end: SR 152 near Hollister

Location
- Country: United States
- State: California
- Counties: Monterey, San Benito, Santa Clara

Highway system
- State highways in California; Interstate; US; State; Scenic; History; Pre‑1964; Unconstructed; Deleted; Freeways
← SR 155	→ SR 157

State Route 156 (SR 156) is a west to east state highway in the U.S. state of California, running from State Route 1 in Castroville to State Route 152 near Hollister. It serves as part of the primary route from the Monterey Peninsula to either the San Francisco Bay Area or the California Central Valley.

== Route description ==
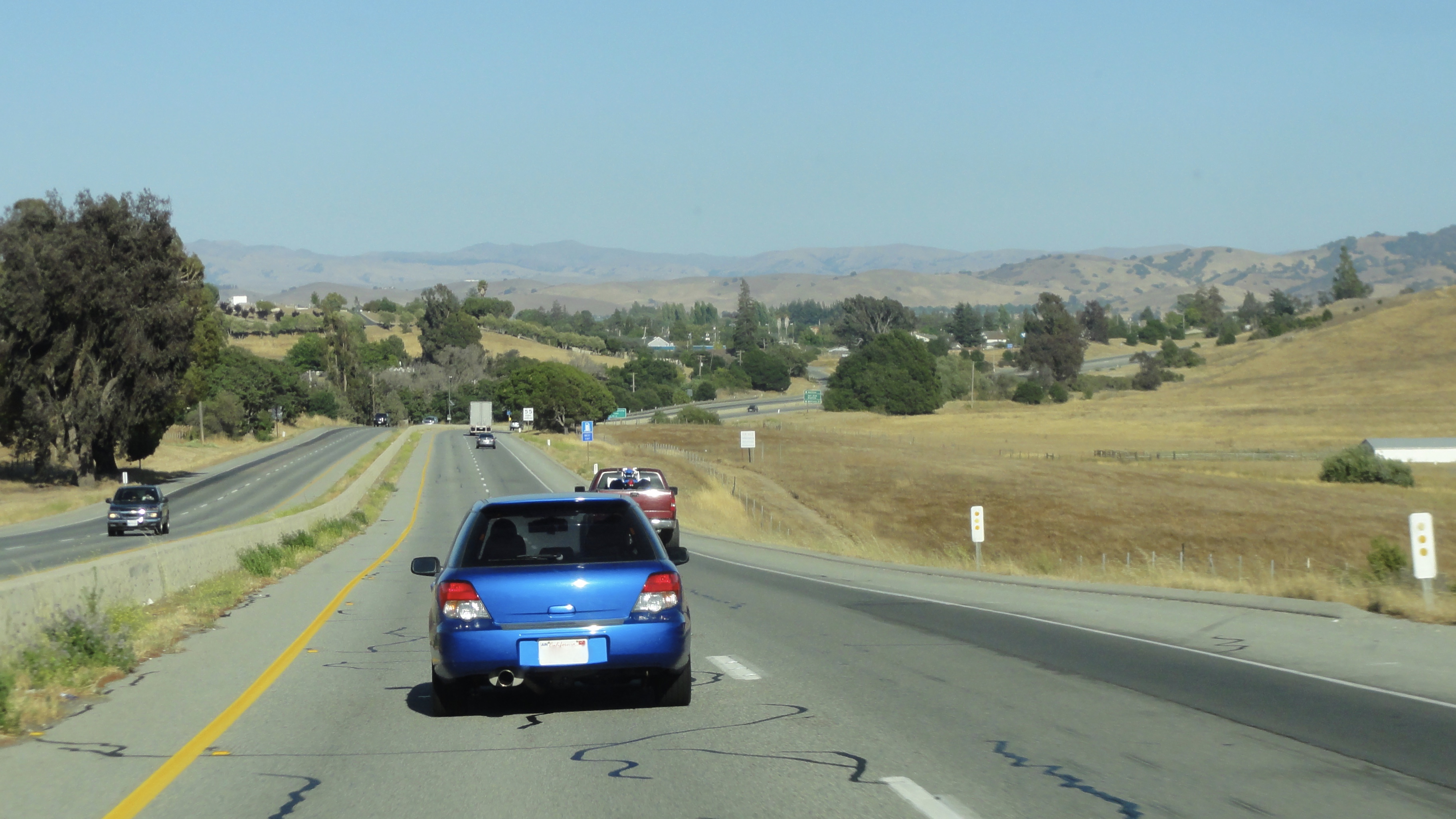
State Route 156 west of San Juan Bautista

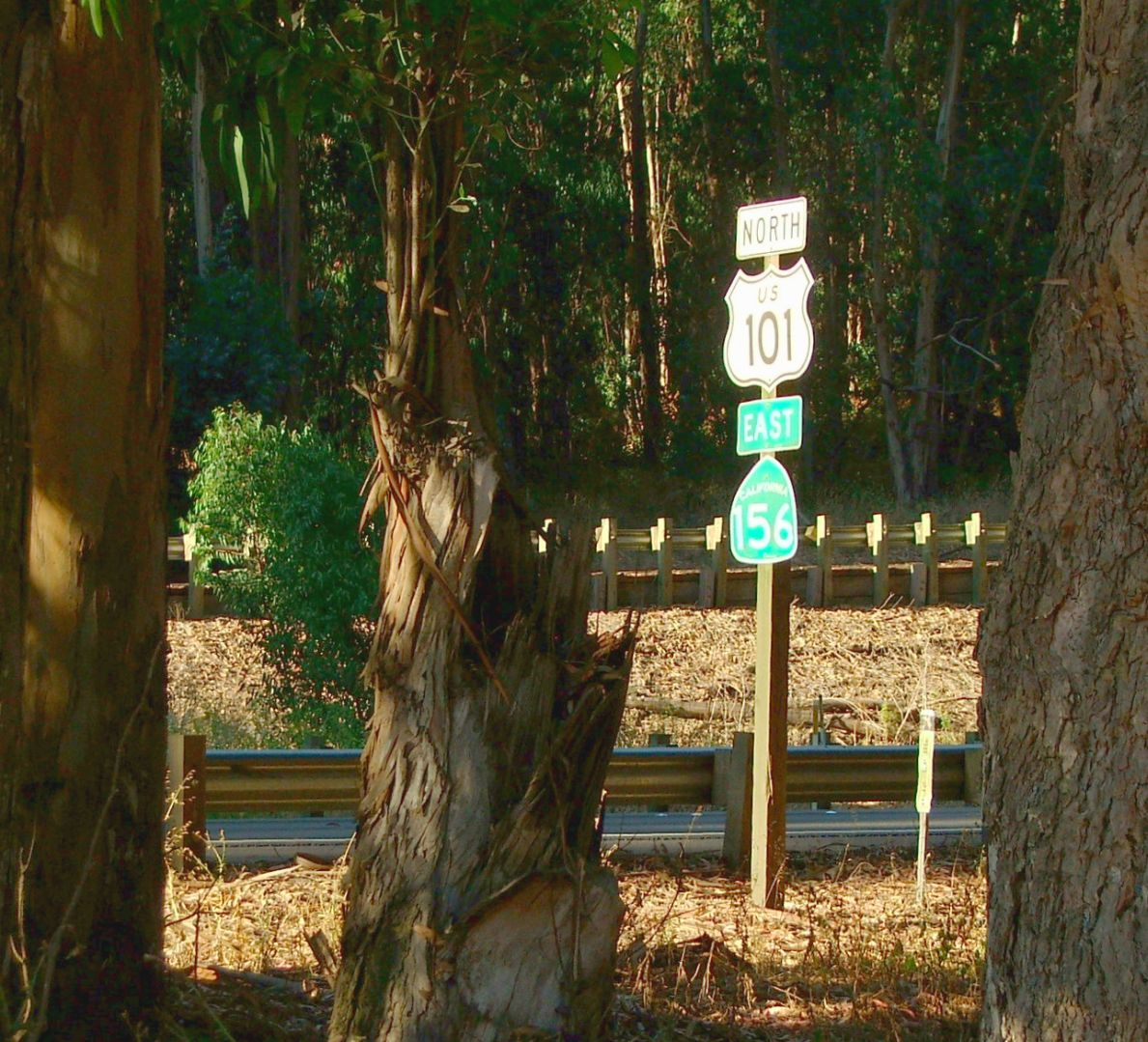
SR 156 concurrent with US 101 west of San Juan Bautista

Route 156 is defined in section 456 of the California Streets and Highways Code. The definition omits the concurrency with Route 101 instead of duplicating that segment in the other route's definition in the code:

Route 156 is from:
(a) Route 1 near Castroville to Route 101 near Prunedale.
(b) Route 101 to Route 152 passing near San Juan Bautista and Hollister.

The western terminus of State Route 156 is at State Route 1 in Castroville. The eastern terminus is at State Route 152 near Hollister. It overlaps U.S. Route 101 for 8 miles (13 km) between Prunedale and San Juan Bautista. Route 156 passes through Monterey, San Benito, and Santa Clara Counties. Along with US 101, it is the quickest route from the San Francisco Bay Area to the Monterey Peninsula. In addition, SR 156's connection with SR 152 allows direct access to the California Central Valley.

For its westernmost two miles (3 km), Route 156 is a freeway through Castroville, terminating at a Y-interchange with the Route 1 freeway. There is no direct access from Route 156 West to Route 1 North or Route 1 South to Route 156 East. Motorists who want to go from Route 1 South to Route 156 East can do so by using Route 183 South through Castroville. Traffic heading west on Route 156 can access Route 1 North by exiting at the Route 183 interchange and heading north. The route then truncates into a two-lane road between Castroville and Prunedale. Route 156 joins U.S. 101 for the next 8 miles (13 km) before splitting off as an expressway east to San Juan Bautista. Just after the intersection with The Alameda, Route 156 returns to a 2-lane road, then curves north by northeast, with several at-grade signal intersections, including one with State Route 25. Route 156 then crosses into Santa Clara County approximately 1/4 mile (300 meters) before a divided road and terminating at State Route 152 as a partial interchange. However, motorists wishing to use westbound SR 152 must exit at Casa de Fruita, as there is no direct interchange between eastbound SR 156 and westbound SR 152.

SR 156 is part of the National Highway System, a network of highways that are considered essential to the country's economy, defense, and mobility by the Federal Highway Administration. The route is eligible for the State Scenic Highway System, and from 1 mile (1.6 km) east of Castroville to US 101 is officially designated as a scenic highway by the California Department of Transportation, meaning that it is a substantial section of highway passing through a "memorable landscape" with no "visual intrusions", where the potential designation has gained popular favor with the community.

== History ==
The original portion of the route was defined in 1909 and ran from U.S. Route 101 to Hollister. In 1933, the remainder of the route (between Castroville and US 101 and between Hollister and Route 152) was added. It was signed as Route 156 by 1963, but was not part of the original 1934 state signage of routes.

Route 156 was originally routed through Hollister on 4th street and turned left on San Benito Street where it shared a route with Route 25 for 1 mile (as of 2009, SR 25 was rerouted onto a bypass.) before splitting with SR 25, and meeting its current alignment at the current SR 156/ San Benito Road intersection. In 1998, Route 156 was rerouted onto a new bypass of Hollister. A stub of the original route can be seen southeast of this intersection.

Route 156 east originally came to an intersection with US 101. This intersection became dangerous because U.S. 101 traffic didn't stop. This intersection was replaced with an interchange since then. A stub of the intersection can still be seen between the southbound on ramp and the bridge crossing U.S. 101.

== Future ==
Highway 156 experiences heavy truck traffic as it serves as a primary route for moving people and goods between the Monterey Peninsula and the rest of the state. It directly links with Highway 152, one of a small number of passable routes across the Coast Ranges between Monterey Bay and the Central Valley.

=== Monterey County ===
The westernmost segment from Highway 1 to Highway 101 in Prunedale is a heavily traveled 2-lane section that has experienced numerous fatal crashes in recent years. Environmental studies are underway to upgrade this 5-mile (8 km) section to either a 4-lane highway or fully controlled access expressway. The Transportation Agency for Monterey County and Caltrans have narrowed the list of upgrade alternatives to one freeway and one expressway option. Alternative 11 — the expressway option — will add a second carriageway to the existing road. Interchanges will be constructed at Castroville Boulevard and Cathedral Oaks Road, while Oak Hills Drive will be an at-grade intersection. Alternative 12 — the freeway option — will build a new freeway to the south of the existing roadway with an interchange at Castroville Boulevard. Under this alternative, there will be no interchange with Cathedral Oaks Road or Oak Hills Drive. The existing Route 156 would be converted to a frontage road providing access to Cathedral Oaks Road and Oak Hills Drive. The environmental studies were expected to be complete in 2009, with the project originally slated for completion in 2015. As of December 2020, only the interchange at Castroville Boulevard has been funded.

=== San Benito County ===
San Benito County and Caltrans are conducting environmental studies for widening Highway 156 from two to four lanes between Highway 101 near San Juan Bautista and the Santa Clara County line. Interchanges are proposed with Highway 25 northwest of Hollister, Business Route 156 both north and southwest of Hollister, and Highway 101. The entire segment may be upgraded to freeway status to eliminate delays caused by numerous traffic lights currently present in the Hollister area.

== Major intersections ==
Except where prefixed with a letter, postmiles were measured on the road as it was in 1964, based on the alignment that existed at the time, and do not necessarily reflect current mileage. Postmile prefixes include: R reflecting a realignment in the route since then, M indicating a second realignment, L referring to an overlap due to a correction or change, and T indicating postmiles classified as temporary. Segments that remain unconstructed or have been relinquished to local control may be omitted. The numbers reset at county lines; the start and end postmiles in each county are given in the county column.

County	Location	Postmile	Exit	Destinations	Notes
Monterey; MON R0.17-101.32 (Note: Indicates that the postmile represents the distance along US 101 rather than SR 156.)		R0.17	—	SR 1 south – Monterey Peninsula	Westbound exit and eastbound entrance; west end of SR 156; SR 1 north exit 414B
Monterey; MON R0.17-101.32	Castroville	R1.11	—	SR 183 to SR 1 north – Castroville, Salinas	
Monterey; MON R0.17-101.32	Castroville		East end of freeway		
Monterey; MON R0.17-101.32	Prunedale			Prunedale Road	Interchange westbound; at-grade intersection eastbound
Monterey; MON R0.17-101.32	Prunedale	T5.19 95.44		US 101 south / Vierra Canyon Road – Los Angeles	Interchange; west end of US 101 overlap; US 101 north exit 336
Monterey; MON R0.17-101.32	Prunedale	96.14	337	San Miguel Canyon Road (CR G12)	Interchange
Monterey; MON R0.17-101.32	Prunedale	98.37	339	Crazy Horse Canyon Road, Echo Valley Road	Interchange
Monterey; MON R0.17-101.32	Prunedale	100.39		Dunbarton Road to San Juan Road (CR G11) – Aromas, Watsonville	Closed
San Benito; SBT 0.00-R18.43		0.00	342	San Juan Road (CR G11) – Aromas, Watsonville	Interchange
San Benito; SBT 0.00-R18.43			West end of freeway on US 101		
San Benito; SBT 0.00-R18.43		3.00 0.00	East end of freeway on US 101		
San Benito; SBT 0.00-R18.43		3.00 0.00		US 101 north – San Jose, San Francisco	Interchange; east end of US 101 overlap; US 101 south exit 345
San Benito; SBT 0.00-R18.43	San Juan Bautista	3.02		CR G1 (The Alameda)	Former US 101
San Benito; SBT 0.00-R18.43	Hollister			San Juan Road (SR 156 Bus. east) – Hollister	Former SR 156 east
San Benito; SBT 0.00-R18.43		R11.37		SR 25 (Bolsa Road) – Gilroy, Hollister	Converted to a turbo roundabout in 2024
San Benito; SBT 0.00-R18.43		R13.22		San Felipe Road (SR 156 Bus. west) – Hollister	Former SR 156 west
Santa Clara; SCL 0.00-R0.60		R0.60		SR 152 east – Los Banos	Interchange; eastbound exit and westbound entrance; east end of SR 156; access to SR 152 west is via SR 152 east to Casa de Fruta Parkway
1.000 mi = 1.609 km; 1.000 km = 0.621 mi: Closed/former; Concurrency terminus; Incomplete access

== Hollister business loop ==
State Route 156 Business
- Location: Hollister, California
- Existed: 1998–present

State Route 156 Business (SR 156 Bus.) is a business loop that runs along SR 156's former alignment through Hollister, California. It splits from SR 156 as San Juan Road to run east to downtown Hollister as Fourth Street, then heads north as San Benito Street and San Felipe Road to rejoin the parent route. It still exists within the state highway system under the unsigned designation SR 156U (for "unrelinquished" highways).

=== Major intersections ===
The entire route is in San Benito County.

Location	mi	km	Destinations	Notes
	0.0	0.0	SR 156 to US 101	Western terminus
Hollister	2.8	4.5	Fourth Street east, San Benito Street south	San Benito Street is former SR 25 south
Hollister	3.8	6.1	SR 25	
Hollister	5.1	8.2	Fallon Road	
	6.7	10.8	SR 156	Eastern terminus
	6.7	10.8	San Felipe Road	Continuation beyond SR 156
1.000 mi = 1.609 km; 1.000 km = 0.621 mi
