= Paicines, California =

Unincorporated community in California, United States

- Unincorporated community
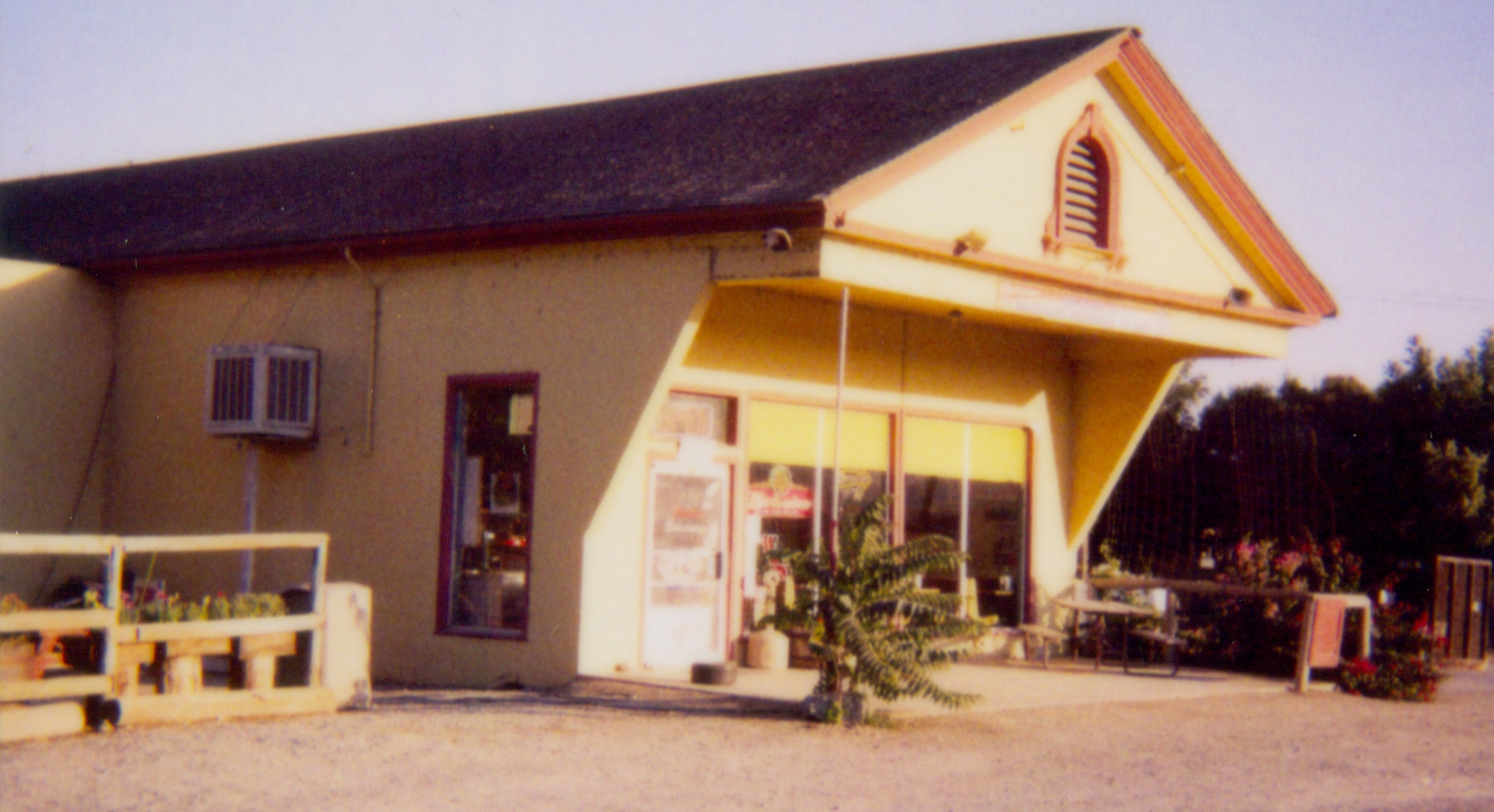
- Paicines General Store marks the intersection of SR25 and County Road J1.

- Location within California Location within the United States
- Coordinates: 36°43′43″N 121°16′39″W
- Country: United States
- State: California
- County: San Benito
- Elevation: 682 ft (208 m)
- Time zone: UTC-8 (Pacific (PST))
  - Summer (DST): UTC-7 (PDT)
- Zip code: 95043
- Area code: 209
- GNIS feature ID: 1659334

Paicines is an unincorporated community in San Benito County, California, United States. The community is at the intersection of Panoche Road and SR 25.

== History ==
The settlement at the modern location of Paicines was originally called Tres Pinos, after a prominent grouping of three pine trees located on a nearby hill. By 1873 the Southern Pacific Railroad had been constructed to a point 5 miles (8.0 km) north of the town to a point they called Tres Pinos station, causing much confusion. In 1874 the name of the town was changed to Grogan for three months before settling on Paicines.

== Geography ==
=== Climate ===
According to the Köppen Climate Classification system, Paicines has a semi-arid climate, abbreviated "BSk" on climate maps.

== Government ==
In the state legislature, Paicines is located in the 17th senatorial district, represented by Democrat John Laird, and in the 29th Assembly district, represented by Democrat Robert Rivas.

In the United States House of Representatives, Paicines is in California's 18th congressional district, represented by Democrat Zoe Lofgren.

== Notable people ==
- Charlie Root, a professional baseball player, retired to a ranch here.

== See also ==
- County Route J1 (California)/Panoche Road
- Panoche, California
- Tres Pinos, California
