= Panoche, California =

Unincorporated community in California, United States

- Unincorporated community
- Location of Panoche within California
- Coordinates: 36°35′49″N 120°50′01″W
- Country: United States
- State: California
- County: San Benito
- Elevation: 1,220 ft (372 m)
- Time zone: UTC-8 (Pacific)
  - Summer (DST): UTC-7 (Pacific)
- ZIP Code: 95043
- Area code: 831
- GNIS feature ID: 252760

The unincorporated community of Panoche is located along Panoche Road in the southern, rural part of San Benito County, California, United States. The community is approximately 2.7 driving miles east of County Route J1. The county seat, Hollister, is roughly 35 miles (56 km) straight-line distance. The Fresno County line is about 3.7 miles (6.0 km) distant to the northeast. The area encompassed by San Benito County continues just over 20 miles (32 km) farther south where the south extent meets Fresno and Monterey counties.

The Panoche Inn is one of few area landmarks, currently owned and operated by Sam and Kim Lippert. In earlier years, it was run by Frank and Juana Mendez, who also brought irrigation into Panoche and created Panoche Road, which runs southeast to its intersection with Highway 5. The bar is busy with motorcycles and dirtbikers who go explore the nearby ghost town of New Idria.

Some customers camp at Mercey Hot Springs, while others ride off-road vehicles at a nearby Bureau of Land Management tract in the Panoche Hills. Alternatively, they can explore the ghost town of New Idria via New Idria Road.

The adjacent private grass airstrip is also used by local pilots in spring and autumn by agreement with the Inn owners. On the drive from Interstate 5, motorists will pass Little Panoche Reservoir: about 12.6 straight-line miles distant at 7.6 degrees off true north.

Panoche Valley grasslands are frequented by a variety of bird species of special interest, including Golden Eagle, Mountain Plover, Ferruginous Hawk, Prairie Falcon, Merlin, Mountain Bluebird, Loggerhead Shrike, Burrowing Owl, and Long-billed Curlew. The valley provides critical habitat, especially in winter, for these birds. Mammals in the area include three federally endangered species; the San Joaquin Kit Fox, Giant Kangaroo Rat, and Nelson's Antelope Squirrel. American Badger is also native to the valley. Endangered reptiles in the valley includes Blunt-nosed Leopard Lizard.

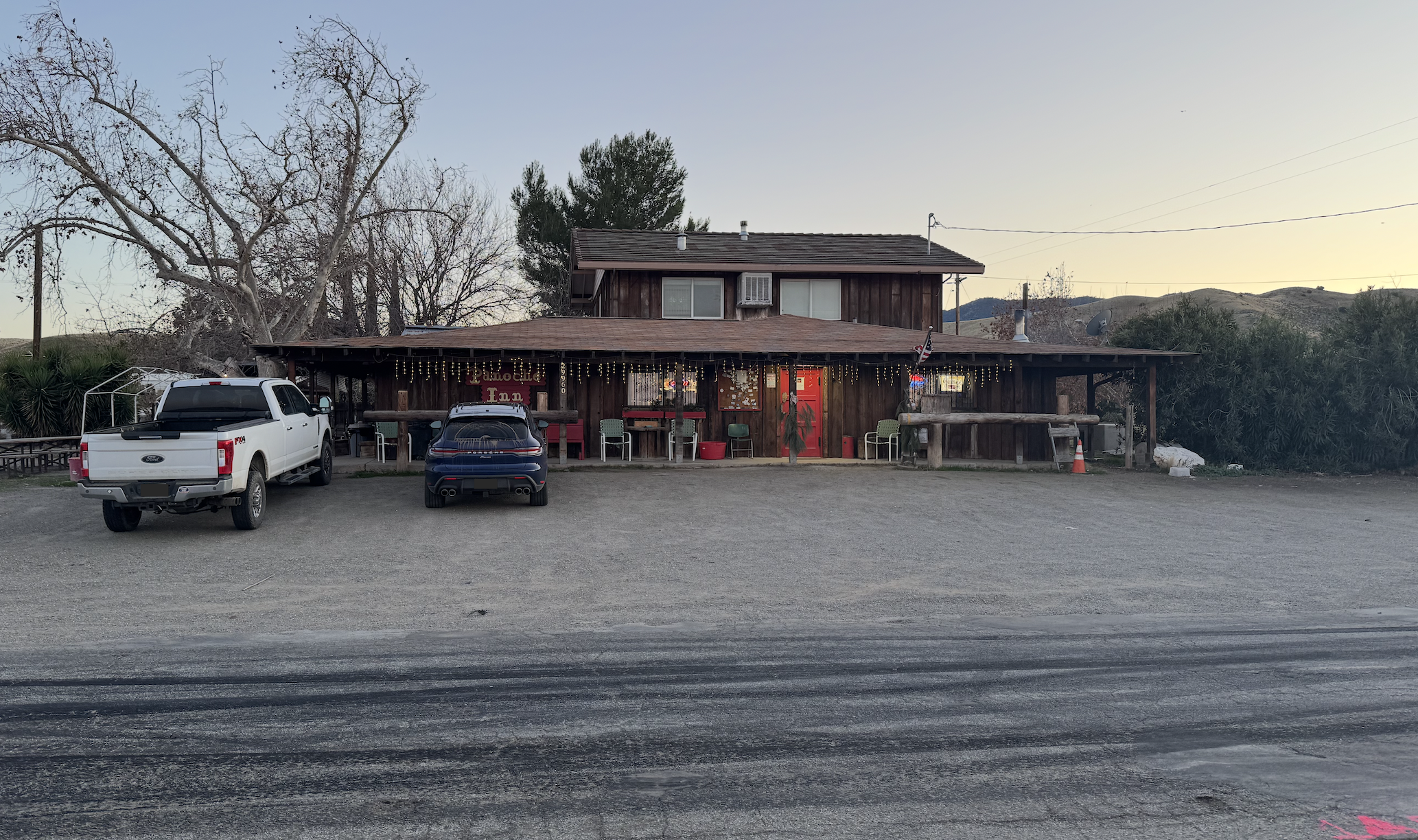
The Panoche Inn in January 2025

It is thought that the name Panoche is derived from the local Indian word for a species of cane that once grew in the valley from which the Indians extracted panoche, a kind of sugar. It is believed that this is the origin for the name panocha, a popular Mexican and Filipino sugar (though processed somewhat differently from each other), and a pudding eaten during Lent in New Mexico and southern Colorado.

The ZIP Code is 95043. The community is served by area code 831.

== Nearby features ==
- Mercey Hot Springs, California
- New Idria, California
