= Mercey Hot Springs =

Unincorporated community in Fresno County, California

Coordinates: 36°42′15″N 120°51′37″W

- Mercy Hot Springs
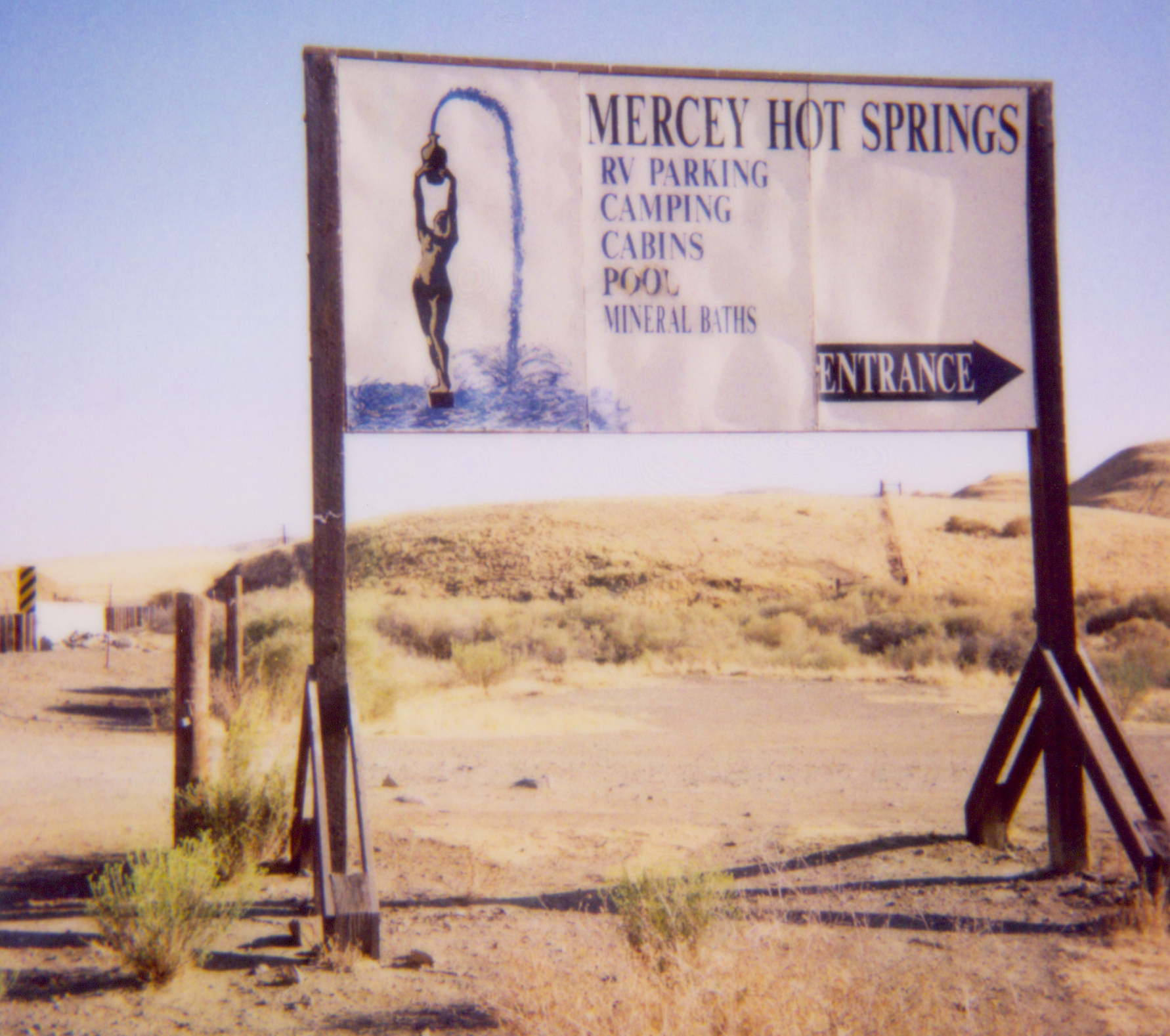

- Location within California
- Location: Fresno
- Elevation: 1,161 feet (354 meters)
- Type: geothermal
- Temperature: 119 °F (48 °C)

Mercey Hot Springs (formerly Mercy Hot Springs) is an unincorporated community and historical hot springs resort in the Little Panoche Valley of Fresno County, central California, United States, approximately 60 miles (97 km) west-southwest of Fresno.

== History ==
Historically the hot springs were used by Native Americans. Local native peoples introduced the springs to John Merci, a sheep herder and early European settler; he later changed the spelling of his name to Mercy. The springs were discovered by settlers on the Arroyo de Pannochita in 1848. During the California Gold Rush it was known as the Aguaje Panochita. This watering place was used by mesteneros as holding point for their captured mustangs. It was a station on La Vereda del Monte used by the Five Joaquins Gang driving their horses southward to their hideout on the Arroyo de Cantua. The later resort opened after 1900. In 1912, Mercy sold the property to Frederick Bourn, who was a real estate developer from San Francisco. Bourn built cabins and a hotel at the hot springs. In the mid-1930s the hotel burned in a fire, and a bathhouse and restaurant was built to replace the hotel. Later a campground and swimming pool was added.

== Hot springs water profile ==
The natural hot mineral water emerges from one of the sources at 119 °F (48 °C), and from an artesian well at 110 °F.

== Facilities ==
There are cabins at the hot springs available to rent, tent spaces and RV campsites. There is a pool large enough for swimming that is fed from an artesian hot well, and several bathtub soaking pools.

== Location ==
Mercey Hot Springs is located in the Little Panoche Valley; the facility includes natural hot springs. Little Panoche Road was formerly part of a stagecoach route.

The ZIP Code of the settlement is 93622, and the community is served by area code 559. It lies at an elevation of 1,161 ft (354 m).
