= East of Eden (2026 miniseries) =

American period drama miniseries by Zoe Kazan

- Release poster
- Genre: Historical drama Psychological drama Thriller
- Created by: Zoe Kazan
- Based on: East of Eden by John Steinbeck
- Showrunners: Zoe Kazan; Jeb Stuart
- Written by: Zoe Kazan; Alexander Chee
- Directed by: Garth Davis; Laure de Clermont-Tonnerre
- Starring: Florence Pugh; Christopher Abbott; Mike Faist; Hoon Lee; Ciarán Hinds
- Music by: Laura Karpman
- Country of origin: United States
- Original language: English
- No. of episodes: 7

Production
- Executive producers: Zoe Kazan; Garth Davis; Jeb Stuart; Antoine Douaihy; Zack Hayden; Jill Arthur; Florence Pugh; Steve Golin; David Levine; Laure de Clermont-Tonnerre
- Producer: Jack Sainte-Rose
- Cinematography: Stuart Dryburgh; Sam Chiplin
- Editors: Jane Rizzo; Julia Bloch; Meg Reticker
- Running time: 51–68 minutes
- Production companies: Collab Productions; Anonymous Content; Fifth Season

Original release
- Network: Netflix
- Release: October 1, 2026

East of Eden is a 2026 American historical drama television limited series starring Florence Pugh. It was created by Zoe Kazan, whose grandfather Elia Kazan directed the 1955 film adaptation. It is adapted from the 1952 novel by John Steinbeck and premiered on Netflix on October 1, 2026. It received generally positive reviews from critics.

== Premise ==
The series takes place from the late 19th century to World War I and focuses on the life of Cathy Ames, along with half-brothers Adam and Charles Trask in Connecticut, as well as her sons, fraternal twin brothers Caleb and Aron, in Salinas Valley, California.

== Cast ==
=== Main ===
- Florence Pugh as Cathy Ames
  - Vaughan Reilly as Adolescent Cathy
- Christopher Abbott as Adam Trask, Cathy's husband
  - Asher Whitehead as young Adam Trask
  - Costa D'Angelo as adolescent Adam Trask
- Mike Faist as Charles Trask, Adam's half-brother
  - Gus Turner as young Charles Trask
  - Tom Sweet as adolescent Charles Trask
- Hoon Lee as Lee, Adam's servant
- Ciarán Hinds as Samuel Hamilton, Adam's neighbor

=== Recurring and guest ===
- Joseph Zada as Caleb "Cal" Trask, Cathy and Adam's son and Aron's fraternal twin brother
  - Bodhi Aisher as Young Cal
- Joe Anders as Aron Trask, Cathy and Adam's son and Caleb's fraternal twin brother
  - Jonah Wren Phillips as Young Aron
- Martha Plimpton as Faye, the madam of a prestigious brothel
- Tracy Letts as Cyrus Trask, Adam and Charles' strict father
- Robert Morgan as Sheriff Quinn, investigating Cathy's disappearance
- Josh McConville as Mr. Thomas Edwards, Cathy's pimp
- Simon Maiden as Bill Ames, Cathy's father
- Leeanna Walsman as Elizabeth Ames, Cathy's mother
- Christopher Sommers as Mr. Bacon, an abusive brothel customer
- Zoe Phillips as Abra Bacon, Mr. Bacon's daughter
  - Gigi Morabito as Young Abra
- Nicholas Burton as James Grew, Cathy's naive Latin teacher
- Anita Hegh as Liza Hamilton, Samuel's wife
- Richard Hartley as Cotton Eye Joe, a musician at the brothel
- Peter Hayden as Dr. Wilde, a doctor who attends the harlots
- Amelia Reynolds as Ethel, a prostitute employed at Faye's
- Rose Flanagan as Georgia, a prostitute employed at Faye's
- Courtney Cavallaro as Alice, a prostitute employed at Faye's
- Perry Yung as Older Lau, the cook who raised Lee
- Jack Barry as Will Hamilton, Samuel's son
- Brad McMurray as Joe Valery, an enforcer for Kate's brothel

== Episodes ==
This is a caption
No.	Title	Directed by	Written by	Original release date
1	"Brothers"	Garth Davis	Zoe Kazan	October 1, 2026
In 1899, a beaten and barely-alive Cathy Ames crawls to a farmhouse. Half-brothers Adam and Charles Trask find her. While Adam is compassionate, Charles stay wary. The brothers' backstory reveals their abusive military father Cyrus rigorously raised them as soldiers. Despite the brothers' mutual reliance, resentment grew as Cyrus favored Adam. In 1884, Cyrus ordered Adam to join the army and Charles to manage their farm while Cyrus worked in D.C. It opposed the brothers' wishes. (Cyrus later claimed the army would have unleashed Charles's suppressed brutal nature.) Charles had beaten up Adam, believing he intentionally thwarted him. In 1889, Adam re-enlisted to defy Cyrus, who wanted him to pursue a government career. In 1899, following Cyrus's death, Adam returns home and reconnects with Charles. Among Cyrus's documents is a military medical discharge issued a few months after he enlisted; his Civil War stories were lies. Cyrus leaves a small fortune he could not legitimately have earned. Adam is indifferent, but Charles is conflicted. Their argument is interrupted by Cathy outside.
2	"Cathy"	Garth Davis	Zoe Kazan	October 1, 2026
Cathy's backstory is revealed in flashback, detailing her learning to manipulate men, including a love-struck schoolteacher driven to suicide. Her harsh father, believing Cathy deliberately enticed the teacher, whipped her. To escape her parents, teenage Cathy murdered them in a house fire staged to fake her own death. Using a different name, she worked as a prostitute in Boston. Whoremaster Mr. Edwards made Cathy his mistress. Suspecting she was stealing his money and secretly having clients, he savagely beat Cathy, leaving her for dead in the Connecticut countryside. Cathy arrived at the Trask farm severely battered and bloodied. As Cathy recovered, Adam fell deeply in love, building tension with Charles, who recognized that Cathy's inner darkness mirrored his own. Despite Charles's protests, Adam married Cathy and intended to move to California. After drugging Adam on their wedding night, Cathy seduced Charles.
3	"In the Valley"	Garth Davis	Zoe Kazan	October 1, 2026
Adam and Cathy settle on a remote farm in California's Salinas Valley. Wealthy Adam freely spends money improving the house but never farms the land. He is content there, but Cathy detests it. Cathy, now pregnant, attempts a self-induced abortion but fails. Meanwhile, Adam befriends Samuel Hamilton, an Irish emigrant from a nearby farm, and he hires Lee, a Chinese American domestic worker who code-switches around white people. Cathy gives birth to fraternal twin boys but she shuns them, and Lee becomes the infants sole caretaker. As soon as Cathy has recovered, she attempts to leave the farm. Adam tries stopping her, but she shoots him in the shoulder. Lee, returning from town hours later, finds Adam bleeding on the floor. After Cathy's departure, a heartbroken Adam sinks into depression and neglects his sons. A few months later, Samuel urges Adam to be a more attentive father and to name the infants. Inspired by the Bible, Adam calls them Caleb and Aron.
4	"Kate"	Garth Davis	Zoe Kazan	October 1, 2026
In 1901, Cathy, calling herself "Kate Albey," works as a prostitute in a Salinas brothel. She is a favorite among clients, the other girls, and Faye, the kindly house madam. Cathy persuades Faye to let her help run the house, improving its efficiency, saving money, and increasing revenue. Cathy eventually becomes Faye's most trusted worker and companion. Faye initially asked Sheriff Quinn to vet Cathy's background, but he quickly recognized her and knows she shot Adam. He will not arrest her, tell Adam her whereabouts, or reveal Cathy's real identity to Faye on condition that Cathy avoids the Trask family, believing she would cause them harm. Cathy manipulates Faye into making her the sole beneficiary, then slowly poisons her to death. A year later, Cathy, now the owner, expands the brothel's size and paints the exterior black.
5	"Departure"	Laure de Clermont-Tonnerre	Zoe Kazan & Alexander Chee	October 1, 2026
Ten years later, Caleb ("Cal") and Aron, now teenagers, have been primarily raised by Lee, while Adam remains emotionally distant. The boys believe their mother died. Shortly before his death, Samuel Hamilton confirms rumors that Cathy runs a brothel, hoping the truth finally frees Adam. Adam later confronts her there. Cathy taunts him and implies that Charles may have fathered their sons. Finally understanding Cathy's true nature, Adam finds closure. He becomes a more attentive father and moves the family to Salinas for a fuller social life. Lee wants to realize his longtime dream of opening a bookstore in San Francisco's Chinatown. Before leaving, Lee wants Adam to tell his sons about Cathy, though Adam disagrees. Cal overhears them arguing but says nothing to Aron about their mother. Adam, who wrote Charles hoping to reconcile, receives notice that his brother died and has left $100,000 to him and Cathy. Mourning Charles' death, Adam sends Cathy the wedding-day photograph of himself, Cathy, and Charles. As Cathy stares at it, she hallucinates talking with Charles.
6	"The Great Try"	Laure de Clermont-Tonnerre	Zoe Kazan	October 1, 2026
In San Francisco, racism and Chinatown's crime syndicates quash Lee's business dream. His once-principled adoptive father, Lau, now runs a gambling den. Lee returns to the struggling Trask family, who welcome him back, though he demands full autonomy in running the household. Cal, believing he was born bad, wanders town aimlessly. He follows and eventually meets Cathy, who is becoming paranoid. She wants Aron to continue believing she is dead. Meanwhile, former prostitute Ethel returns to blackmail Cathy about Faye's suspicious death. Cathy pays Ethel $100, then frames it as a theft before sending her assistant, Joe, after her. Adam invests in a risky business venture to ship chilled produce to eastern markets by railroad. When it fails and nearly bankrupts Adam, Aron worries that his girlfriend, Abra, will no longer marry him. Hoping to recoup Adam's loss, Cal borrows $5000 from Lee and partners with Will Hamilton to buy up bean contracts from local farmers, speculating prices will skyrocket if the US enters the war. Cal urges Aron to apply for early entrance to Stanford University.
7	"Timshel"	Laure de Clermont-Tonnerre	Zoe Kazan	October 1, 2026
Cathy grows increasingly paranoid and continues "talking" with Charles' spectre. Joe learns Ethel died but pretends to search for her to grift Cathy. Aron attends Stanford but becomes disillusioned and resents carrying his family's expectations. Abra similarly struggles with Aron projecting unrealistic virtues onto her and feels more like Cal. Meanwhile, Cal gives Adam $15,000 he made selling beans to the government. Adam declines, calling it war profiteering and cheating farmers. Aron also chastises Cal, who angrily retaliates by taking Aron to Cathy's brothel, revealing the truth about her. Repulsed and distraught, Aron runs off. Soon after, Cathy, realizing Joe's scam, sends incriminating evidence to Sheriff Quinn, then fatally overdoses on morphine. Joe finds Cathy's body and steals her money. As Joe flees, Quinn shoots and kills him. Cathy has bequeathed everything to Aron, who secretly enlists in the army, Adam suffers a stroke upon finding out. To resist their growing attraction, Cal and Abra avoid one another but eventually reunite and fall in love. When Aron is killed in France, Adam suffers a second stroke. Lee urges Adam to show Cal forgiveness. As he lies dying, Adam whispers, "Timshel," meaning "thou mayest" in Hebrew, telling Cal he was not born bad and has free will.

== Production ==
=== Development ===
The series is adapted by Zoe Kazan, whose grandfather Elia Kazan directed the 1955 film adaptation of the novel. Anonymous Content and Fifth Season co-produced the seven-episode limited series for Netflix. In 2022, it was reported that the series was in development for Netflix, with Florence Pugh attached to star. Garth Davis was the director of the first four episodes, while Laure de Clermont-Tonnerre served as director of the last three episodes. Jeb Stuart served as co-showrunner alongside Kazan. Executive producers include Pugh, Kazan, Stuart, Davis, Clermont-Tonnerre, Antoine Douaihy, Steve Golin, David Levine, Zack Hayden and Jill Arthur.

=== Casting ===
In September 2024, it was reported that Christopher Abbott, Mike Faist, and Hoon Lee had joined the series alongside Pugh. The following month, new additions to the cast included Joseph Zada, Tracy Letts, Martha Plimpton, Joe Anders and Ciarán Hinds.

=== Filming ===
Principal photography began in New Zealand in October 2024. Filming locations are reported to include Auckland, Dunedin and Oamaru in the South Island. The production wrapped in March 2025. Initially Mike Faist was only signed on to appear in the first three episodes, but when Netflix saw early footage of his performance they commissioned one additional episode to feature Faist more.

=== Music ===
Laura Karpman composed the series' score.

== Release ==
The series was released on Netflix on October 1, 2026.

== Reception ==
The review aggregator website Rotten Tomatoes reported an 88% approval rating with an average rating of 7.7/10, based on 74 critic reviews. The website's critics consensus reads, "Zoe Kazan imbues her legacy adaptation with delicious moral quandaries and sumptuous landscapes, but it's the expanded character work from Pugh and Lee that brings justice and dignity to this new canon of East of Eden." Metacritic, which uses a weighted average, assigned a score of 80 out of 100 based on 27 critics, indicating "generally favorable" reviews.

The series received generally positive reviews. Lacy Baugher gave it three out of four stars on RogerEbert.com, writing that "...the combination of Pugh's performance and the show's unabashed insistence that her story is worth telling in its own right—on her own terms—makes for something that's still deeply satisfying to watch." Writing for The Guardian, Lucy Mangan gave the series four out of five stars, concluded that "As a high-quality family saga, then, it's brilliant, compelling entertainment [but] as an examination of how helpless we are before our inborn proclivities, it perhaps cannot help but lack the heft it needs." In The New Yorker, Inkoo Kang praised Pugh's performance as "a master class in physicality and flair, one of her career bests." Alison Herman in Variety praised both Pugh's and Lee's "standout efforts, which etch their characters deep into one's memory."
