= Cathy Ames =

Fictional character of John Steinbeck

- East of Eden character
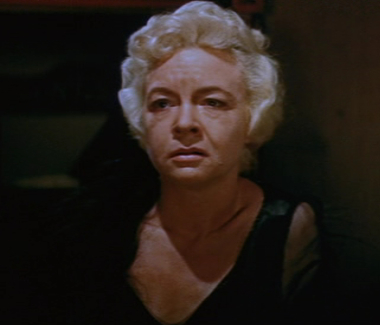
- Jo Van Fleet as Cathy Ames in the 1955 film adaptation of East of Eden
- Created by: John Steinbeck
- Portrayed by: Jo Van Fleet (film); Jane Seymour (1981 miniseries); Florence Pugh (2026 miniseries)

In-universe information
- Nicknames: Kate Trask, Kate Albey
- Gender: Female
- Occupation: Prostitute, madam, housewife
- Family: William Ames (father); Mrs. C. Ames (mother); Charles Trask (brother-in-law)
- Spouse: Adam Trask
- Children: Caleb and Aaron Trask
- Nationality: American

Catherine "Cathy" Ames, later known as Kate Trask or Kate Albey, is a fictional character and the main antagonist in John Steinbeck's 1952 novel East of Eden. She is married to the protagonist Adam Trask, and the mother of his twin sons, Caleb and Aron. Beneath her charming, attractive facade, she is an evil woman who manipulates and destroys people for her own amusement and profit. Steinbeck characterizes her as a "psychic monster" with a "malformed soul".

== Concept and creation ==
In 1951, Steinbeck wrote a series of letters, later published as Journal of a Novel: The East of Eden Letters, to his editor Pascal Covici during the process of writing East of Eden. On March 26, Steinbeck first mentions Cathy to Covici: "This is a woman and you must know her; know her completely because she is a tremendously powerful force in the book." The majority of these letters demonstrate that Steinbeck was most fascinated with Cathy's character, mentioning once that he must get back to writing about his "dear Cathy".

== Physical description ==
Steinbeck depicts Cathy as small-breasted, delicate, blonde and beautiful, with "oil-soaked" skin that gives her a "pearly-light" and a sense of allurement. Her beauty and charm fool most of the people she encounters, but a few characters detect her true nature by looking into her eyes, which Steinbeck describes as cold and emotionless. Samuel Hamilton, a supporting character in the novel, takes note that "the eyes of Cathy had no message, no communication...they were not human eyes". Cathy is described as having "small, stubby round feet with fat little insteps that almost resemble hooves", enhancing her Satanic imagery.

During the birth of Caleb and Aron Trask, Cathy's body is depicted as monstrous and unnatural, showing the female body as a destructive force. Cathy then refuses to nurture her children, thus denying one of the primary functions of her female body. Her body cannot produce milk, mirroring the uncultivated state of Adam Trask's land. In contrast to Cathy, Samuel Hamilton represents the "male mother", and a male instinct to wrestle nurturing power away from the destructive mother. Cathy refuses to be a passive site from which to bear children.

As the novel progresses, Cathy becomes increasingly less attractive. She develops crippling arthritis in her hands, and by the end of the novel she is described as "a sick ghost".

== Appearances in the novel East of Eden ==
=== Part 1 ===
Cathy is the only daughter of a respectable family in a small Massachusetts town. Throughout her childhood, she pointedly causes harm to anyone who has a relationship with her. She uses her precocious sexuality to manipulate and destroy men: When her mother catches her fooling around with two boys, she lies that they attempted to rape her, resulting in their committal to a correctional facility; a few years later, she drives her naïve Latin professor to suicide by toying with his affections. At a young age, she learns to mimic emotions she is incapable of feeling in order to manipulate people into giving her what she wants. She attempts to run away once, at 16, to Boston, but her father tracks her down and reluctantly whips her as punishment. Afterward, she is a model student, and even qualifies to become a school teacher. Consequently, her parents trust her enough to give her the combination to the family safe. Soon afterward, she robs the safe and burns down her family home while her parents are trapped inside, killing them.

She then runs away to Connecticut and meets a whoremaster named Mr. Edwards. The two become lovers for a time, until Edwards begins to suspect that she is being dishonest with him. He hires a detective who discovers a newspaper story about the death of Cathy's parents and her mysterious disappearance. Finally fed up, Mr. Edwards gives her a savage beating and leaves her to die by a country roadside. That night, Cathy is rescued by Adam Trask and his brother Charles. As Adam nurses Cathy back to health on their family farm, he succumbs to her beauty and resolves to marry her. Cathy accepts his proposal in order to gain protection from Mr. Edwards. Charles sees through her and tries to warn his lovestruck brother, who refuses to listen. Part one ends with Cathy drugging Adam into a deep sleep and then having sex with Charles.

=== Part 2 ===
After moving to California with Adam, Cathy becomes pregnant (the novel is ambiguous as to whether by Charles or Adam) and in turn attempts a primitive abortion on herself with a knitting needle. Though she warns Adam that she plans to leave as soon as she is able, he brushes this off as homesickness. She leaves her family a few weeks after giving birth to twin boys, Cal and Aron, and shoots Adam in the shoulder when he tries to stop her.

Cathy then changes her name to Kate Albey and joins a whorehouse. She endears herself to the kindhearted madam, Faye, who eventually makes her new charge the main beneficiary in her will. Kate begins secretly poisoning Faye, and finally kills her by overdosing her on pain medication. She then assumes full ownership of the whorehouse, which she turns into a den of sexual sadism.

=== Part 3 ===
The plot steers away from Kate's life for some years, until Adam visits her at the whorehouse. She reveals her motives for the first time, admitting that, from a young age, she took pleasure in using people: "I could make them do whatever I wanted...when I was half-grown I made a man kill himself." She then shows Adam pictures of multiple public figures, including a US senator and a priest, who visit the whorehouse, and denounces the entire human race as a pack of hypocrites; she tells Adam that she would "rather be a dog than a human." Cathy attempts to seduce Adam, but he resists her temptations; enraged, she has her bouncers beat him up and throw him out.

Later on, Adam returns to give Kate $50,000 left to her by Charles, who has recently died. She is confused as to why Adam would show her any kindness, and refuses to believe in the sincerity of his actions. Adam finally sees Kate for what she is, and pities her, telling her:

And the men who come to you here with their ugliness, the men in the pictures—you don't believe those men could have goodness or beauty in them. You see only one side, and you think—more than that, you're sure—that's all there is.

=== Part 4 ===
Years later, Cal visits her. Cal's goodness makes Kate uncomfortable, especially when he states his love for his father: "a curious spasm shook [Kate]—an aching twist tore in her chest." They have a brief conversation, in which Kate spitefully tells her son that they are just alike. Cal leaves, telling Kate that she is simply afraid.

Soon afterward, the truth of Faye's murder starts to surface, and Kate fears being found out. She covers up the truth by framing her employees Joe and Ethel, the only people who know what really happened. At this point, she loses the will to live, especially when she is visited by Aron, who is disgusted by her. Literary critic Sarah Aguiar notes that this incident causes Kate to feel remorse for the first time. She signs over all her possessions to Aron, not Cal. She then kills herself by taking a lethal dose of morphine.

== Archetypes ==
Cathy Ames, like other characters in East of Eden, is archetypical. To Steinbeck, the book's characters were "symbol people", made to illuminate certain facets of each character's personality. Carter Davis Johnson argued that Cathy is intentionally single-faceted and unable to access timshel, a central idea in the book representing the ability of humans to execute their own actions. In addition to timshel, Cathy is also excluded from East of Eden's biblical allegory, instead embracing Alice's fantasy in Alice's Adventures in Wonderland by Lewis Carroll (1865).

=== The Devil ===
One of the main characteristics of East of Eden is its allegory with the Bible and the battle between good and evil. In a letter to family friend Allen Ludden, Steinbeck states that "Kate is a total representative of Satan".

As noted by John Timmerman, Steinbeck demonstrates the devil allegory through repeated snake-like imagery used to describe Cathy. In one instance in the novel, Samuel Hamilton observes that "when [Cathy] swallowed, her tongue flicked around her lips...the eyes were flat and the mouth with its small up-curve at the corners was carven", giving a serpentine air to Cathy's demeanor.

=== Pandora ===
Cathy also takes on the Pandora persona from classic Greek mythology. The story goes that Zeus gave Pandora a jar (commonly thought of as a box) and commanded her not to open it. She ultimately disobeys and when she opens the box, she sets loose evil into the world. In an academic article from The Explicator, Rebecca Barnes compares Cathy to Pandora in that her "broken box brings disaster" wherever she goes. In the novel Cathy harms or destroys every life she touches: she murders her parents, drives her Latin teacher to commit suicide, shoots her husband, poisons her benefactress, and sadistically abuses (and later blackmails) countless men as a prostitute.

== Psychoanalysis ==
In Stephen George's article "The Emotional Content of Cruelty", he writes that Cathy embodies hatred and fear, which he argues are the main motivators behind human cruelty. He writes that Cathy fears losing control in any way; for example, she refuses to drink because alcohol brings out her true nature. Her method of controlling her environment comes in the form of paranoia, which is manifested by her desire to manipulate men sexually. The hatred she feels in effect subdues her fear so that she feels superior to those she manipulates.

In her essay "No Sanctuary", Sarah Aguiar writes that Cathy's actions are due to a perversion of human virtues such as compassion and love. Aguiar explains this deficiency is due to Cathy's "child-like egocentricity...the desperate need...to protect herself at all costs." Steinbeck further comments in his East of Eden letters that Cathy is in part evil because her "life is one of revenge on other people because of a vague feeling of her own lack."

Carter Davis Johnson said that Cathy personifies the id and exploits the superego, aligning with Sigmund Freud's understanding of libido as a central part of human nature and a tool in achieving happiness. Steinbeck critiques Freudian analysis through Cathy's character, showing the limits of Cathy's black-and-white understanding of the world. Cathy is separate from other Jungian characters, reduced to a nihilistic shell of a person by the end of the book.

== Adaptations ==
In 1956, Jo Van Fleet won an Academy Award for Best Supporting Actress for her role as Cathy Ames in the 1955 film adaptation of East of Eden.

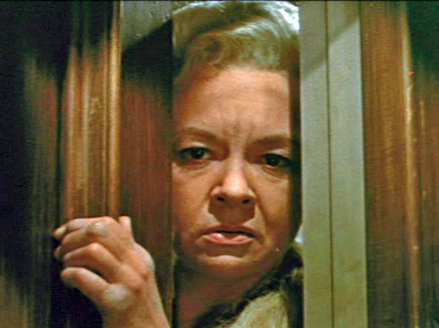
Jo Van Fleet as Cathy Trask

In 1982, Jane Seymour received a Golden Globe Award for Best Actress – Miniseries or Television Film for her portrayal of Cathy Ames in the 1981 miniseries adaptation of East of Eden, which premiered on ABC. In an interview with Oprah Winfrey, Seymour commented that "there is nothing greater than playing evil incarnate. It is wonderful! It is an amazing experience, because you climb into a spirit or a soul that you have no idea you know, you can't even imagine it."

Florence Pugh played Ames in the 2026 miniseries adaptation of East of Eden, which premiered on Netflix on October 1, 2026.
