= Hoon Lee =

American actor (born 1973)

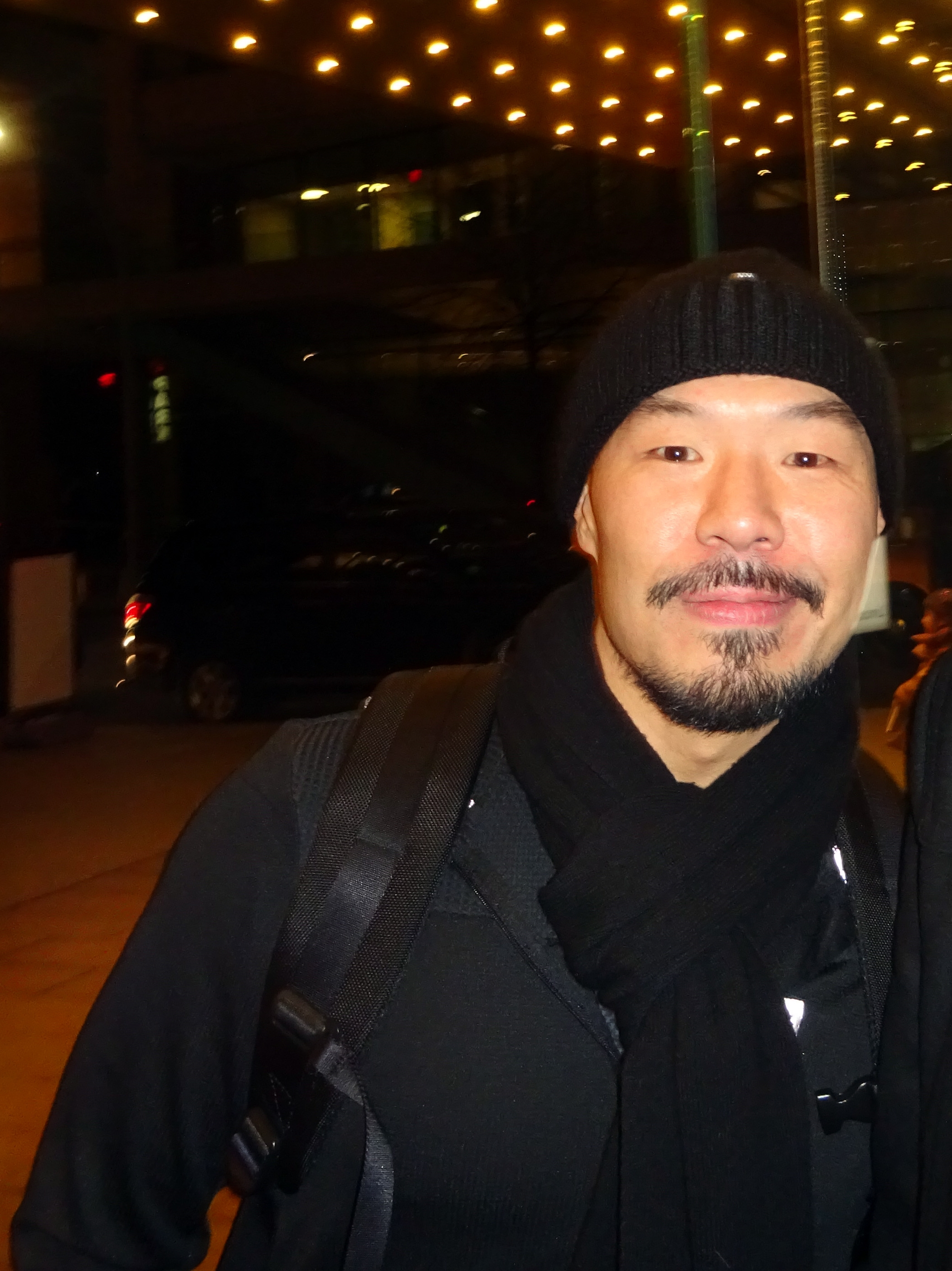
- Lee in 2016
- Born: Dong Hoon Lee; July 18, 1973 (age 53); Plymouth, Massachusetts, U.S.
- Education: Harvard University
- Occupation: Actor
- Years active: 2001–present
- Spouse: Sekiya Lavone Billman (m. 2008)

Korean name
- Hangul: 이동훈
- Hanja: 李東勳
- RR: I Donghun
- MR: I Tonghun

Dong Hoon Lee (Korean: 이동훈; born July 18, 1973) is an American actor. He is known to television audiences for his roles as Job on Banshee (2013–16), Wang Chao on Warrior (2019–23), Barney Choi on Your Friends & Neighbors (2025–present), and Lee in the 2026 Netflix limited series adaptation of John Steinbeck's East of Eden, and for voicing Hamato Yoshi / Splinter on Teenage Mutant Ninja Turtles (2012–17). His stage work includes leading roles in several Broadway musicals, notably as the King of Siam in the 2015 revival of The King and I.

== Early life and education ==
Of Korean descent, Lee was born in Plymouth, Massachusetts in 1973. He is the son of Jung Ja Lee and Moon Soo Lee, and his brother is Tony Lee, a club volleyball coach at MIT. He graduated from Harvard University in 1994 with a degree in English literature and environmental studies.

== Career ==
=== Theatre ===
He appeared in 2001 in the Broadway production of Urinetown. He played many roles over the years until he was cast as Rosencrantz in a musical version of Hamlet. He starred in the 2002 revival of Flower Drum Song and the 2004 revival of Pacific Overtures.

In 2008, Lee won a Theatre World Award and was nominated for a Drama League Award for performance in David Henry Hwang's Yellow Face. In 2011, he was nominated for a Helen Hayes Award for Terrence McNally's Golden Age.

On June 18, 2015, it was announced that Lee would succeed Jose Llana in the role of the King of Siam in Lincoln Center's Tony-winning revival of The King and I. Lee formally joined the cast on September 29, 2015, playing the King until April 2016.

=== Film and television ===
In television, Lee got his first role as Dr. Mao in an episode of Sex and the City in 2003. He also made guest appearances in Law & Order, Fringe, Royal Pains, White Collar, NCIS: New Orleans and other series. He also had small roles in movies such as Saving Face, We Own the Night, Premium Rush, and The Oranges.

In March 2012, he was cast in a starring role as Job, a drag queen ultra-level computer hacker, in the television series Banshee.

== Personal life ==
Lee married Sekiya Lavone Billman in October 2008. They met in 2001 while performing in a production of Making Tracks at a benefit in Taipei, Taiwan, for Second Generation, an Asian American theater company in Manhattan.

== Filmography ==
=== Film ===
Year	Title	Role	Notes
2004	Saving Face	Raymond Wong	
2007	We Own the Night	Emergency Services Driver	
2011	The Oranges	Henry	
2012	Exposed	Taki	
2012	Premium Rush	Floor Manager	
2016	Identity Crisis	Assassin	Short film
2020	Mulan	Village Magistrate	
2023	The Monkey King	Jade Emperor, Monk (voices)	

=== Television ===
Year	Title	Role	Notes
2003	Sex and the City	Dr. Mao	Episode: "The Domino Effect"
2006	Law & Order	Huot Mam	Episode: "Hindsight"
2008	Fringe	Richard	Episode: "Power Hungry"
2009	The Unusuals	Officer Chung	Episode: "Crime Slut"
2009	Royal Pains	Stu	Episode: "The Honeymoon's Over"
2009	White Collar	Lao Shen	Episode: "All In"
2010	Blue Bloods	Detective Tuan	Episode: "Chinatown"
2012	NYC 22	Detective Lee	Episode: "Crossing the Rubicon"
2012–17	Teenage Mutant Ninja Turtles	Hamato Yoshi / Splinter, Additional characters (voices)	Series regular
2013	Archer	Korean Agent (voice)	Episode: "The Honeymooners"
2013–16	Banshee	Job	Main role
2013–16	Banshee Origins	Job	3 episodes
2014	The Blacklist	Mako Tanida	Episode: "Mako Tanida"
2015	Hawaii Five-0	Kee Mun	Episode: "E 'Imi pono"
2015–18	Bosch	Reggie Woo	6 episodes
2017	Outcast	Kenneth Park	Series regular
2017–18	Iron Fist	Lei Kung	2 episodes
2019	NCIS: New Orleans	Norman Wong	Episode: "Crab Mentality"
2019–23	Warrior	Wang Chao	Main role
2019–20	Rise of the Teenage Mutant Ninja Turtles	Oroku Saki / Shredder, Ancestor (voices)	4 episodes
2021	See	Toad	Main role (season 2)
2022	DMZ	Wilson Lin	Miniseries
2025–present	Devil May Cry	White Rabbit (voice)	7 episodes
2025–present	Your Friends & Neighbors	Barney Choi	Main role
2026	East of Eden	Lee	Miniseries

=== Video games ===
Year	Title	Voice role(s)
2004	Grand Theft Auto: San Andreas	Gangster
2009	Grand Theft Auto: The Lost and Damned	Liberty City NPCs
2011	Homefront	Colonel Jeong, Commander Park
2013	Teenage Mutant Ninja Turtles	Hamato Yoshi / Splinter
2014	Teenage Mutant Ninja Turtles: Danger of the Ooze	Hamato Yoshi / Splinter
2023	Nickelodeon All-Star Brawl 2	Hamato Yoshi / Splinter
