= East of Eden (1981 miniseries) =

1981 American drama miniseries

- Genre: Drama
- Based on: East of Eden by John Steinbeck
- Written by: Richard Alan Shapiro
- Directed by: Harvey Hart
- Starring: Timothy Bottoms; Jane Seymour; Sam Bottoms; Hart Bochner; Bruce Boxleitner
- Music by: Lee Holdridge
- Country of origin: United States
- Original language: English

Production
- Executive producer: Mace Neufeld
- Producer: Barney Rosenzweig
- Production locations: Savannah, Georgia; Calvary Episcopal Church - 532 Center Street, Santa Cruz, California; Gilroy, California; Hitchcock Ranch - 5610 Scotts Valley Dr., Scotts Valley, California; Monrovia, California; Salinas, California; Santa Cruz, California; Capitola, California; Scotts Valley, California
- Cinematography: Frank Stanley
- Editors: Michael Brown; Bill Brame
- Running time: 6 hours 22 minutes .
- Production companies: Mace Neufeld Productions; Viacom Productions

Original release
- Network: ABC
- Release: February 8 – February 11, 1981

East of Eden is a 1981 American television miniseries based on John Steinbeck's 1952 novel of the same name. It aired in three parts on ABC from February 8–11, 1981. It was directed by Harvey Hart from a teleplay by Richard Shapiro, and starred Timothy Bottoms, Jane Seymour, Bruce Boxleitner, Soon-tek Oh, Sam Bottoms, Hart Bochner, Karen Allen and Lloyd Bridges. It ran for roughly 382 minutes.

== Plot ==
Following the Civil War, Union veteran Cyrus Trask has two sons: Adam, a gentle, idealistic soul; and Charles, a rakehell. Charles realizes Cyrus favors Adam, which creates friction between the brothers. Cyrus, an influential diplomat who has amassed a fortune by embezzling from the government, pulls strings to get Adam into West Point. Adam rebels and leaves to live a vagabond life. Following Cyrus' death, Adam returns to the family farm in Connecticut to mend his relationship with Charles, with whom he shares a large inheritance.

Cathy Ames is an evil woman who readily manipulates and destroys people. As a preteen girl (played by an uncredited actress), she falsely accuses two boys of attempted rape. At 16, she drives her naive Latin teacher to suicide by toying with his affections. She then murders her parents in a house fire and stages her own death and disappears. She eventually becomes the mistress of a whoremaster named Jules Edwards. When Edwards realizes she is using him, he severely beats her and leaves her to die. Adam finds her and nurses her back to health. He soon falls in love with her. Charles sees through her facade, but soon succumbs to her wiles and sleeps with her. Adam and Cathy relocate to the Salinas Valley in California, where Cathy gets pregnant and gives birth to twin boys. Shortly after, she shoots Adam in the shoulder when he tries to stop her from leaving.

Adam is devastated, but eventually recovers with help from his loyal Cantonese servant Lee and his old friend Samuel Hamilton. Lee and Hamilton tell Adam the story of Cain and Abel and that God's admonition to Cain - "Timshel", Hebrew for "thou mayest" - symbolizes a human being's freedom to choose between good and evil and forge their own path in life. Inspired, Adam becomes a devoted father to his sons, whom he names Caleb ("Cal") and Aron. He tells them that their mother is dead.

Meanwhile, Cathy has renamed herself Kate Albey and works at a brothel in Monterey. She endears herself to the madam, Faye, who eventually puts Kate in her will; Kate fatally poisons her and takes over the whorehouse. Adam tries to win her back, but she rejects him and implies that Charles may be the boys' father. (It is left ambiguous if the claim is true.)

The story moves ahead and Cal and Aron are teenagers. They are opposites: Aron is virtuous and dutiful, Cal wild and rebellious. In a parallel situation to Adam and Charles, Cal believes that Adam favors Aron, and acts out for his father's attention. Cal learns that Kate is still alive and goes to see her. Cal's goodness and professed love for his father makes Kate uncomfortable, and she spitefully says he is just like her. Cal replies that she is merely afraid, and leaves. On his way out, she tells him not to tell Aron about her.

When Adam goes nearly bankrupt after a bad business venture, Cal resolves to prove his worth by making the money back. He goes into business with Samuel Hamilton's son, Will, making contracts with bean farmers, with the expectation that crop prices will skyrocket when the US declares war on Germany. They make a huge profit, which Cal proudly presents to his father. To his dismay, Adam rejects the gift as "dirty money". Cal lashes out by taking Aron to see Kate at the brothel and introducing her as their mother; Aron is horrified, and runs away to enlist in the war. Wracked with guilt, Cal burns the money he made from the investment. Kate, meanwhile, loses her mind and kills herself by drinking poison.

In the following months, Cal and Aron's girlfriend Abra fall in love. Tragedy strikes when Adam receives a telegram that Aron was killed in battle, and suffers a debilitating stroke. Cal feels responsible, and confesses to Adam what he did. Lee tells the dying Adam that he must give his only remaining son his blessing so he can live a good life. With his last ounce of strength, Adam says one last word to Cal: "Timshel".

== Cast ==
Starring

- Timothy Bottoms as Adam Trask
- Jane Seymour as Cathy Ames/Kate Albey Trask
- Bruce Boxleitner as Charles Trask
- Soon-tek Oh as Lee
- Karen Allen as Abra Bacon
- Hart Bochner as Aron Trask
- Sam Bottoms as Cal Trask

Guest stars

- Warren Oates as Cyrus Trask
- Howard Duff as Jules Edwards
- Anne Baxter as Faye
- Richard Masur as Will Hamilton
- Nick Pryor as James Grew

Special guest star

- Lloyd Bridges as Samuel Hamilton

Co-starring

- Nellie Bellflower as Mrs. Trask
- M. Emmet Walsh as Sheriff Horace Quinn
- Vernon Weddle as Bill Ames
- Grace Zabriskie as Mrs. Ames
- Wendell Burton as Tom Hamilton
- Stymie Beard as Cotton Eye
- Timothy Carey as the Preacher

== Production ==
The railroad scenes were filmed on the Sierra Railroad in Tuolumne County, California.

== Reception ==
The miniseries was a ratings success. Part II was the second most-watched primetime television show in America for the week (28.1 rating, 21.9 million homes), and Part III was fourth (26.4 rating, 20.5 million homes). Part I was ranked 15th for the prior week.

== Awards and nominations ==
Year	Award	Category	Nominee(s)	Result	Ref.
1981	Primetime Emmy Awards	Outstanding Limited Series	Mace Neufeld, Barney Rosenzweig, and Ken Wales	Nominated	
1981	Primetime Emmy Awards	Outstanding Art Direction for a Limited Series or a Special	Ray Storey, Dennis W. Peeples, and Dave L. Love (for "Episode 3")	Won	
1981	Primetime Emmy Awards	Outstanding Cinematography for a Limited Series or a Special	Frank Stanley (for "Episode 2")	Nominated	
1981	Primetime Emmy Awards	Outstanding Individual Achievement – Special Class	Robert Magahay and Judy Truchan (for "Episode 1")	Nominated	
1982	Golden Globe Awards	Best Miniseries or Motion Picture Made for Television		Won (Note: Tied with Bill.)	
1982	Golden Globe Awards	Best Actress in a Miniseries or Motion Picture Made for Television	Jane Seymour	Won	

== Home media ==
East of Eden, in its original 1981 broadcast running time, was released on DVD on March 3, 2009. Previous VHS versions were severely truncated with several hours cut out.
