= San Ardo Oil Field =

Oil field in Monterey County, California

Coordinates: 35.9540°N 120.8615°W

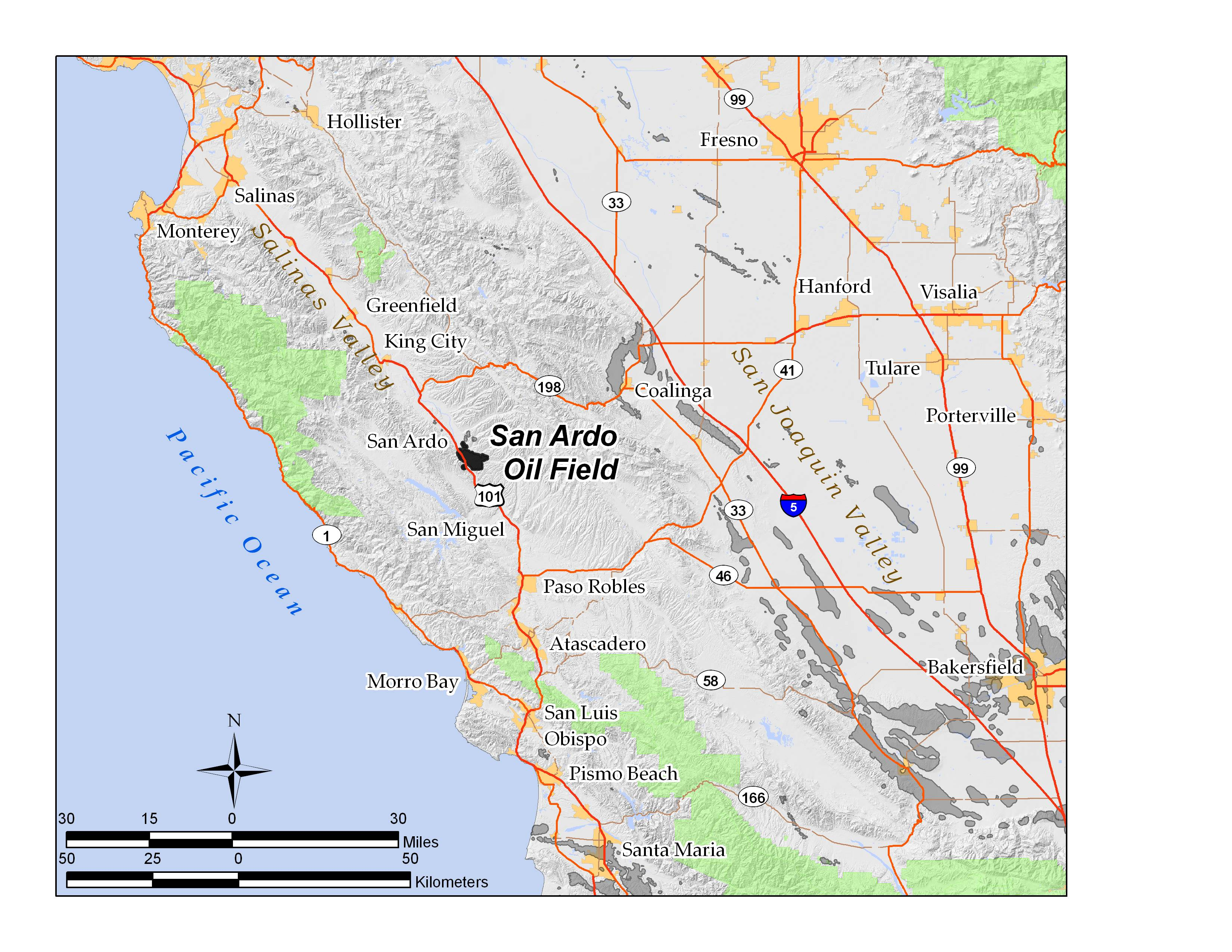
The San Ardo Oil Field in Central California. Other oil fields are shown in gray.

The San Ardo Oil Field is a large oil field in Monterey County, California, in the United States. It is in the Salinas Valley, about five miles (8 km) south of the small town of San Ardo, and about 20 miles (32 km) north of Paso Robles. With an estimated ultimate recovery of 532,496,000 barrels (84,660,100 m^{3}) of oil, it is the eighth-largest producing oil field in California, and of the top 20 California oil fields in size, it is the most recent to be discovered (1947). As of the end of 2006, the principal operators of the field were Chevron Corp. and Aera Energy LLC.

== Setting ==
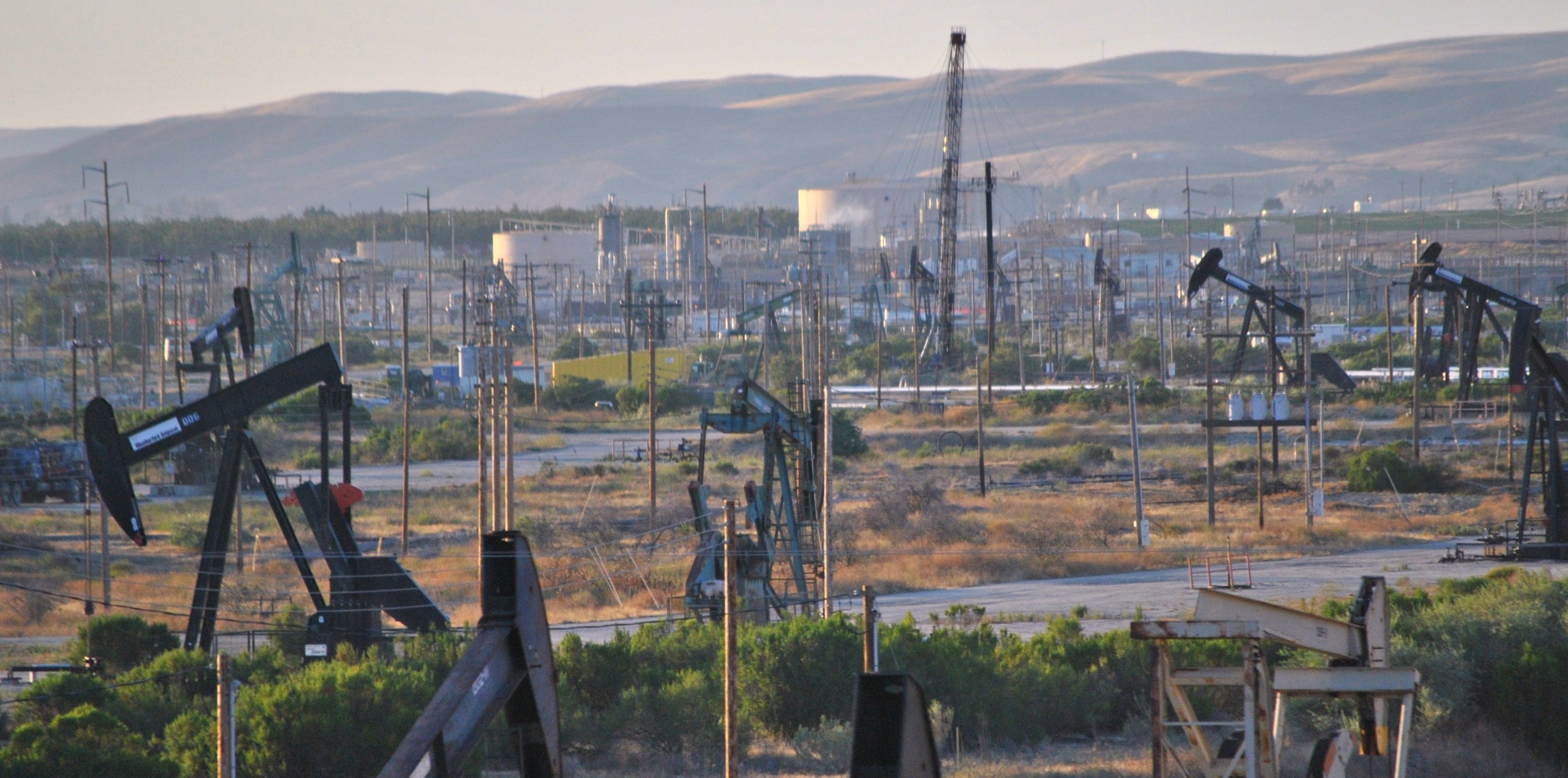
The San Ardo Oil Field From the Coast Starlight.

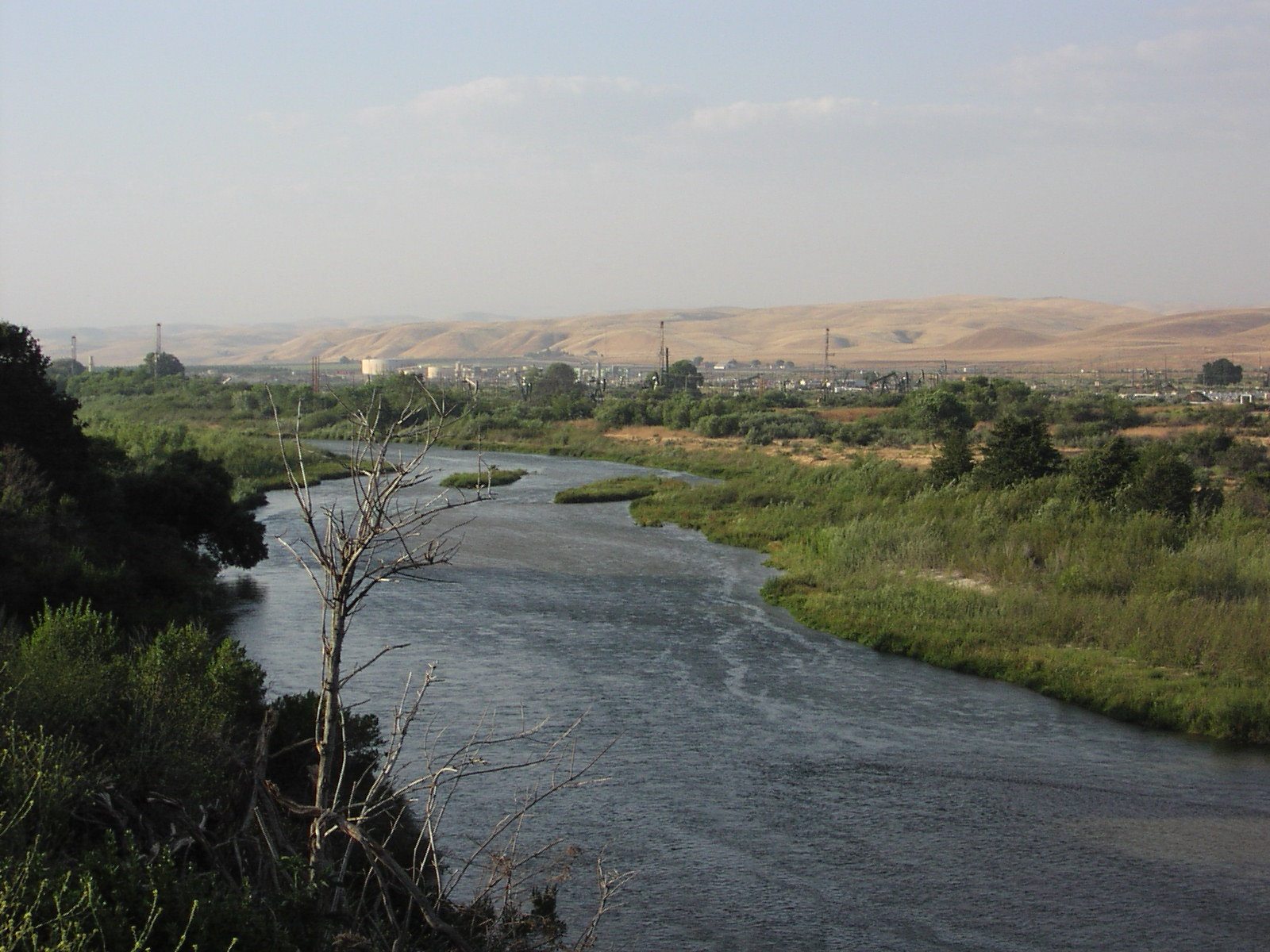
View of the San Ardo Oil Field, with the Salinas River in the foreground.

A familiar sight to travelers on U.S. Highway 101 between Los Angeles and San Francisco, the oil field is located about midway between Paso Robles and King City, in the southern part of Monterey County, at the Alvarado Road exit from U.S. 101. Most of the field is on the east bank of the Salinas River and in the adjacent hills of the Coast Ranges. Overall it is about five miles (8 km) long by two wide, and its productive area encompasses 4,390 acres (17.8 km^{2}). Elevations on the oil field range from approximately 430 feet (130 m) at the Salinas River to around 1,100 feet (340 m) in the hills to the east; the densest area of operations is on the flat land in the river valley.

Vegetation in the oil field area varies from riparian in the immediate vicinity of the Salinas River, to grassland, chaparral, and oak woodland in the hills and uplands, although much of the vegetation has been removed in the central area of active operations. Land immediately north of the oil field in the Salinas River Valley is agricultural, while other adjacent land, which is mostly hilly, is predominantly used for livestock grazing.

== Geology ==
The San Ardo Oil Field is the farthest north of the major oil fields west of the San Andreas Fault in California; most of the other large fields are east of the fault. As is common with California oil fields, the San Ardo Field is an anticlinal structure. The productive units are the Aurignac Sands, which are a portion of the huge Monterey Formation, a sedimentary rock unit which underlies much of coastal California. These sands are an average of about 700 feet (210 m) thick, contain an abundance of heavy crude oil, and overlie granodioritic basement rocks. Above the Aurignac sands are the thinner but also productive Lombardi sands, which can be found at about 1,800 feet (550 m) below ground surface. The granodioritic basement is generally around 2,500 feet (760 m) below ground surface.

Rock formations above the highest productive unit include the Paso Robles, Pancho Rita, and Santa Margarita Formations, of Pleistocene, Pliocene, and Miocene age, respectively. All of the productive units are of Miocene age, and the underlying basement rocks date to the Jurassic period. The Los Lobos thrust fault complex demarcates the western boundary of the field.

== Production and operations ==
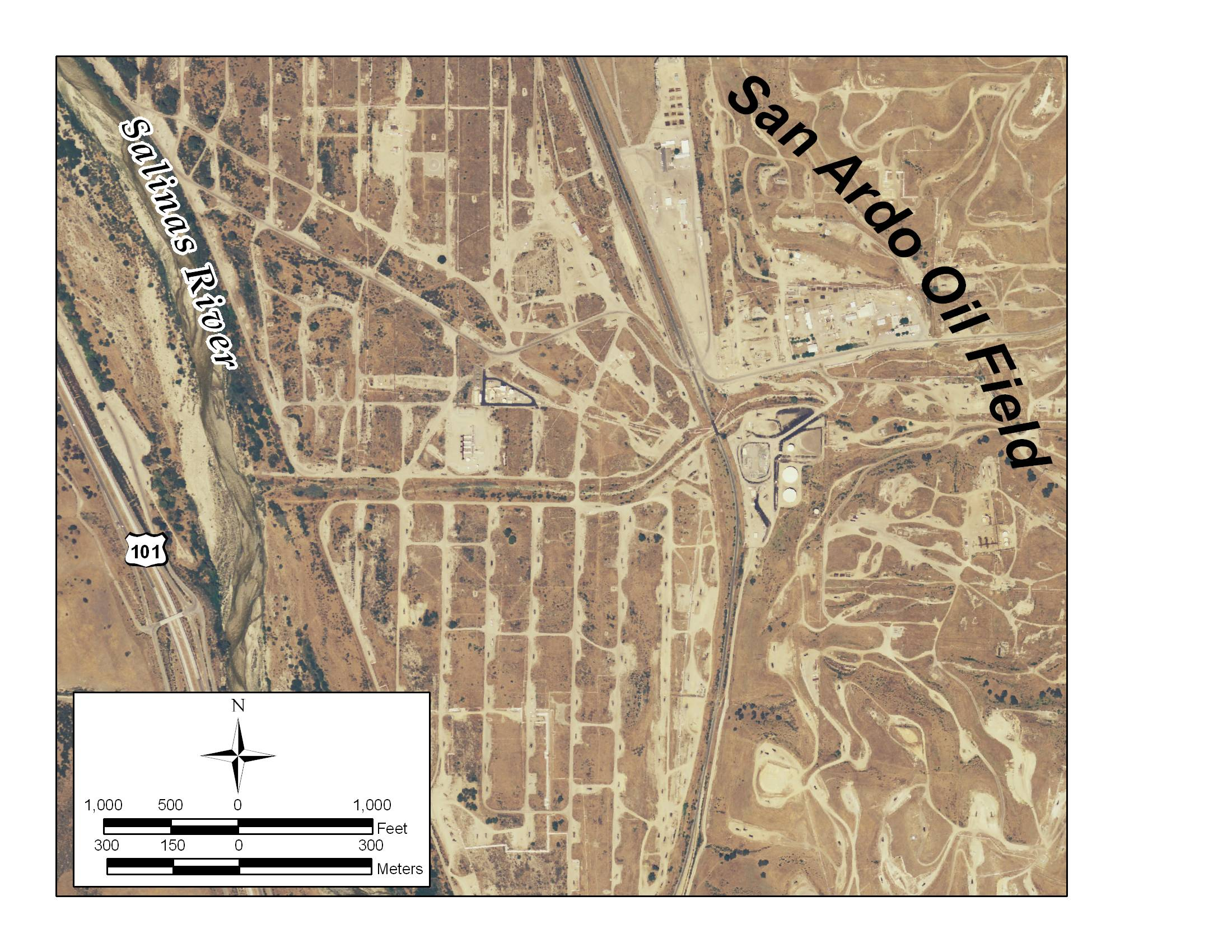
Aerial photograph of the San Ardo Oil Field (2005) showing the central area of operations. U.S. Highway 101 runs along the left.

The Texas Company (later Texaco, and currently Chevron Corp.) discovered the field in November 1947 by drilling their "Lombardi 1" well to a depth of 2,158 feet (658 m). Initial production from the discovery well was 155 barrels per day (24.6 m^{3}/d).

Since the oil is heavy crude, with API gravity of only 9-11 in the Lombardi Sands and 13 in the Aurignac, getting it to flow to production wells can be difficult. Various enhanced recovery technologies developed during the 1960s and 1970s have made the process easier. Steam flooding is the technology of choice in the San Ardo Field; injection wells force steam into the ground to heat the crude and decrease its viscosity, and if strategically placed, can push the oil to nearby production wells. Steam flooding has been used in both the Aurignac and Lombardi sands since 1966-1967; water flooding is also being used in the Aurignac. The peak production from the field was in 1967, the first year in which both productive units were subject to steam flooding. Fireflooding, a technology in which the oil is ignited by an electric coil in the presence of oxygen, with the combustion front moving towards a production well, and sometimes followed by water flooding as a further assist, has also been used in several of the San Ardo pools.

Currently, the principal operators on the field are Chevron Corp. and Aera Energy LLC. Two smaller operators are active on the field as of 2010: NY Oil Company Inc., and Salinas Energy Corp. As of the end of 2008 Chevron and Aera Energy were the two largest producers of oil in California.
