= San Ardo, California =

Unincorporated community in California, United States

- Unincorporated Community; Census Designated Place
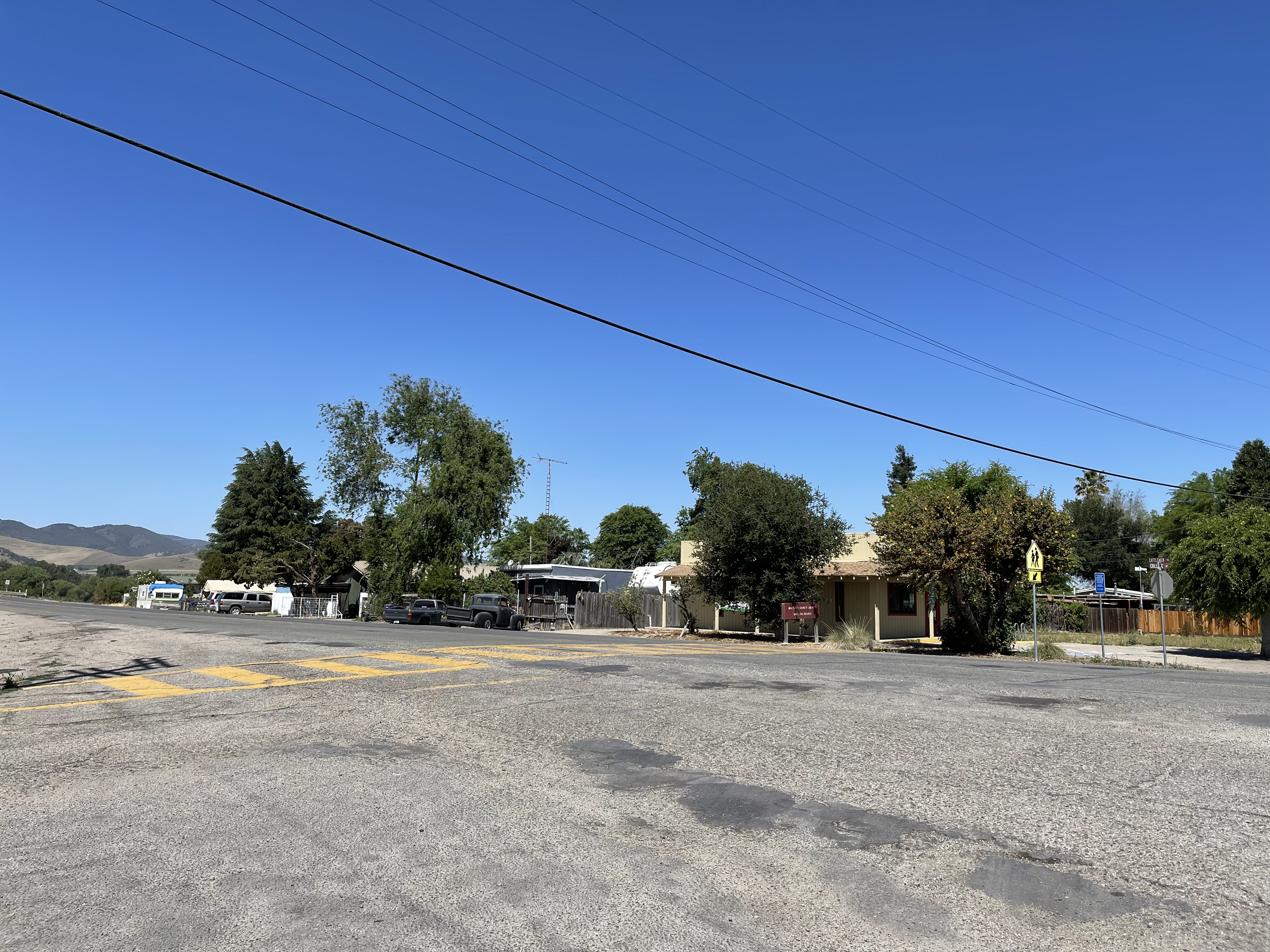
- San Ardo in 2021

- Location in Monterey County and the state of California

- Location in the United States
- Coordinates: 36°01′14″N 120°54′19″W
- Country: United States
- State: California
- County: Monterey

Government
  - State senator: John Laird (D)
  - Assemblymember: Robert Rivas (D)
  - U. S. rep.: Zoe Lofgren (D)

Area
  - Total: 0.449 sq mi (1.164 km^{2})
  - Land: 0.449 sq mi (1.164 km^{2})
  - Water: 0 sq mi (0 km^{2}) 0%
- Elevation: 449 ft (137 m)

Population (2020)
  - Total: 392
  - Density: 872/sq mi (337/km^{2})
- Time zone: UTC-08:00 (PST)
  - Summer (DST): UTC-07:00 (PDT)
- ZIP code: 93450
- Area code: 831
- FIPS code: 06-64476
- GNIS feature ID: 248795

San Ardo, formerly known as San Bernardo (Spanish for "St. Bernard"), is an unincorporated community and census-designated place (CDP) in Monterey County, California, United States. San Ardo is located 18 miles (29 km) southeast of King City at an elevation of 449 feet (137 m). The population was 392 at the 2020 census, down from 517 in 2010.

== History ==
The owner of the San Bernardo land grant, M.J. Brandenstein, laid out the town when the railroad reached his land in 1887. The San Bernardo post office opened in 1886, and changed its name to San Ardo in 1887. The former name of San Bernardo was changed to avoid confusion with San Bernardino, California.

== Geography ==
San Ardo is near the point where the broad Salinas Valley has its southeastern terminus and pinches out within the converging portions of the California Coast Ranges, including the Santa Lucia Mountains on the west and the Cholame Hills and the Diablo Range on the east. U.S. Route 101 passes west of the town, leading northwest to 18 miles (29 km) to King City and 66 miles (106 km) to Salinas, the Monterey county seat, while to the southeast it leads 33 miles (53 km) to Paso Robles.

According to the United States Census Bureau, the CDP has a total area of 0.4 square miles (1.0 km^{2}), all land. The Salinas River flows northward along the western side of the community.

=== Climate ===
This region experiences warm (but not hot) and dry summers, with no average monthly temperatures above 71.6 °F. According to the Köppen Climate Classification system, San Ardo has a warm-summer Mediterranean climate, abbreviated "Csb" on climate maps.

== Economy ==
The huge San Ardo Oil Field is about 5 miles (8 km) south of town. Much of the local economy is based on agriculture (including farming and ranching), and servicing the oil field.

== Demographics ==
Historical population
Census	Pop.	Note	%±
2000	501		—
2010	517		3.2%
2020	392		−24.2%
U.S. Decennial Census; 1860–1870 1880-1890; 1900 1910 1920; 1930 1940 1950; 1960 1970 1980; 1990 2000 2010

San Ardo first appeared as a census designated place in the 2000 U.S. census.

=== 2020 ===
The 2020 United States census reported that San Ardo had a population of 392. The population density was 873.1 inhabitants per square mile (337.1/km^{2}). The racial makeup of San Ardo was 105 (26.8%) White, 0 (0.0%) African American, 9 (2.3%) Native American, 0 (0.0%) Asian, 3 (0.8%) Pacific Islander, 238 (60.7%) from other races, and 37 (9.4%) from two or more races. Hispanic or Latino of any race were 310 persons (79.1%).

The whole population lived in households. There were 124 households, out of which 52 (41.9%) had children under the age of 18 living in them, 57 (46.0%) were married-couple households, 15 (12.1%) were cohabiting couple households, 23 (18.5%) had a female householder with no partner present, and 29 (23.4%) had a male householder with no partner present. 28 households (22.6%) were one person, and 10 (8.1%) were one person aged 65 or older. The average household size was 3.16. There were 85 families (68.5% of all households).

The age distribution was 136 people (34.7%) under the age of 18, 37 people (9.4%) aged 18 to 24, 94 people (24.0%) aged 25 to 44, 77 people (19.6%) aged 45 to 64, and 48 people (12.2%) who were 65 years of age or older. The median age was 28.8 years. For every 100 females, there were 136.1 males.

There were 132 housing units at an average density of 294.0 units per square mile (113.5 units/km^{2}), of which 124 (93.9%) were occupied. Of these, 43 (34.7%) were owner-occupied, and 81 (65.3%) were occupied by renters.

=== 2010 ===
At the 2010 census San Ardo had a population of 517. The population density was 1,150.7 inhabitants per square mile (444.3/km^{2}). The racial makeup of San Ardo was 252 (48.7%) White, 1 (0.2%) African American, 3 (0.6%) Native American, 5 (1.0%) Asian, 0 (0.0%) Pacific Islander, 245 (47.4%) from other races, and 11 (2.1%) from two or more races. Hispanic or Latino of any race were 363 people (70.2%).

The whole population lived in households, no one lived in non-institutionalized group quarters and no one was institutionalized.

There were 140 households, 76 (54.3%) had children under the age of 18 living in them, 82 (58.6%) were opposite-sex married couples living together, 16 (11.4%) had a female householder with no husband present, 13 (9.3%) had a male householder with no wife present. There were 6 (4.3%) unmarried opposite-sex partnerships, and 1 (0.7%) same-sex married couples or partnerships. 22 households (15.7%) were one person and 9 (6.4%) had someone living alone who was 65 or older. The average household size was 3.69. There were 111 families (79.3% of households); the average family size was 4.13.

The age distribution was 185 people (35.8%) under the age of 18, 66 people (12.8%) aged 18 to 24, 139 people (26.9%) aged 25 to 44, 83 people (16.1%) aged 45 to 64, and 44 people (8.5%) who were 65 or older. The median age was 26.6 years. For every 100 females, there were 112.8 males. For every 100 females age 18 and over, there were 129.0 males.

There were 158 housing units at an average density of 351.7 per square mile, of the occupied units 47 (33.6%) were owner-occupied and 93 (66.4%) were rented. The homeowner vacancy rate was 4.1%; the rental vacancy rate was 9.6%. 145 people (28.0% of the population) lived in owner-occupied housing units and 372 people (72.0%) lived in rental housing units.

=== 2000 ===
At the 2000 census, the median household income was $25,208 and the median family income was $31,500. Males had a median income of $30,417 versus $14,375 for females. The per capita income for the CDP was $11,379. About 15.4% of families and 24.0% of the population were below the poverty line, including 32.5% of those under age 18 and 13.5% of those age 65 or over.
