= Journal of a Novel =

1969 novel by John Steinbeck

Journal of a Novel: The East of Eden Letters
- First edition cover
- Author: John Steinbeck
- Language: English
- Genre: Diary
- Publisher: The Viking Press
- Publication date: 1969
- Publication place: United States
- Media type: Print (Hardcover & Paperback)

Journal of a Novel: The East of Eden Letters is a letter collection written by the American author John Steinbeck to his friend and editor Pascal Covici, in parallel with the first draft of his longest novel, East of Eden.

Steinbeck wrote East of Eden in a notebook given to him by Covici. As a daily "warm-up" writing exercise, he composed letters to Covici on the left pages of the notebook, then wrote the novel on the right pages. The letters were not mailed or intended for publication, and are similar to journal entries. The letters were written between January 29 and October 31, 1951. The collection was first published by Viking in 1968, the year after the author's death.

The letters discuss the novel's development, plot, and characters; Steinbeck's philosophies and experiences of writing; and details of his daily life, such as his recurrent insomnia and his hobbyist carpentry projects. They also include his regular word counts and calculations of the pace at which the novel is being written.

One review praised the "remarkable revelation" the collection provides though sharing the intimate and unusually uninhibited thoughts of an important writer. This was echoed in a later review of the 1971 paperback edition, which called the letters "autobiographical material of the first order, casting a flood of light on the creative process, and standing as a unique testament to the struggles and joys of writing." A syndicated review by John Barkham highlighted the mundane experiences described in Steinbeck's letters, writing that "[t]he letters are endlessly fascinating, which is not to say they are essential or unique." A review in The Times-Picayune was highly critical, stating that the collection "should interest students who have to do papers on John Steinbeck, but few others", and that the material should not have been published.
