= East of Eden (film) =

1955 film by Elia Kazan

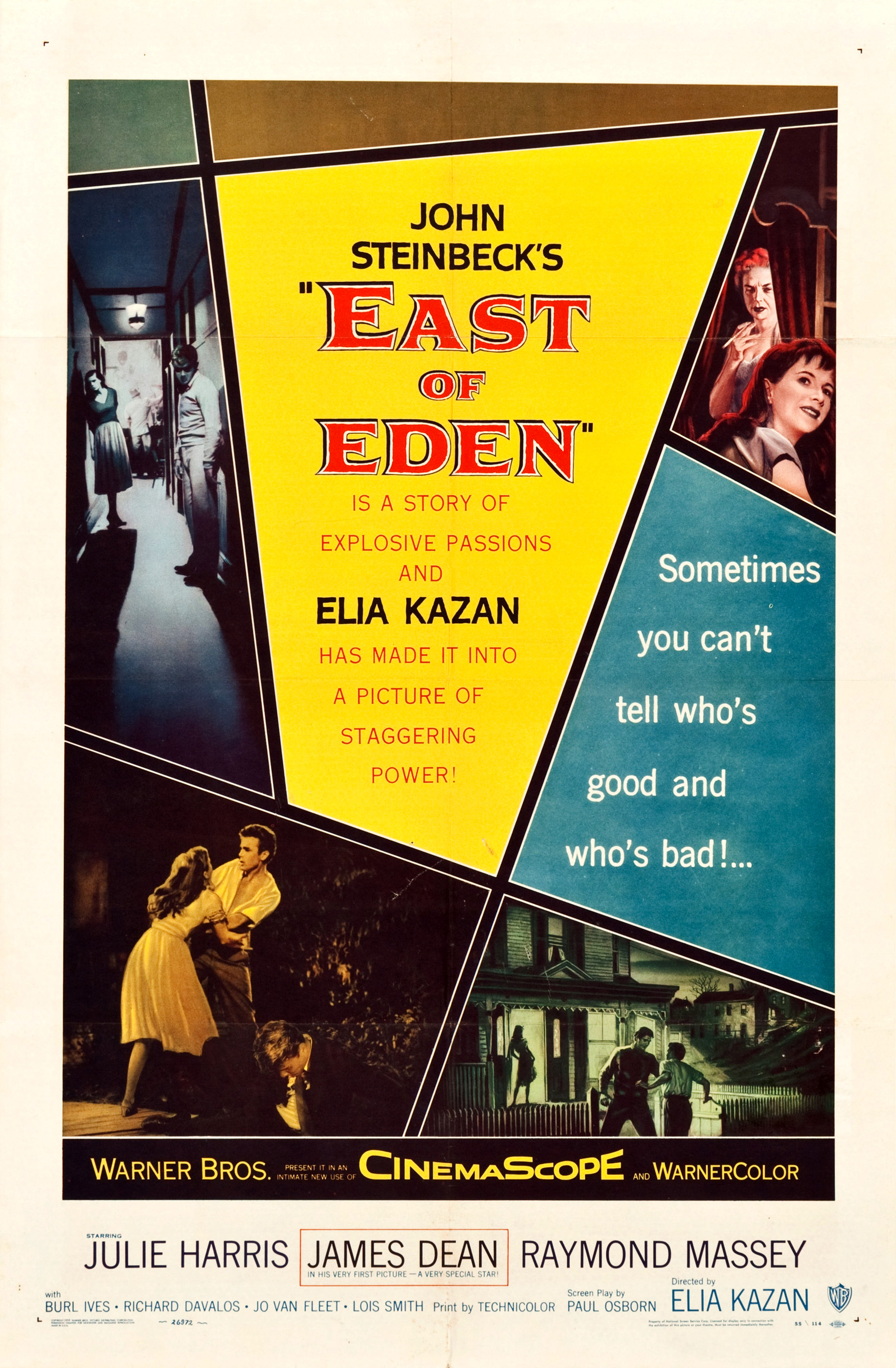
- Theatrical release poster
- Directed by: Elia Kazan
- Screenplay by: Paul Osborn
- Based on: East of Eden; 1952 novel by John Steinbeck
- Produced by: Elia Kazan
- Starring: Julie Harris; James Dean; Raymond Massey
- Cinematography: Ted D. McCord
- Edited by: Owen Marks
- Music by: Leonard Rosenman
- Production company: Warner Bros. Pictures
- Distributed by: Warner Bros. Pictures
- Release date: March 9, 1955
- Running time: 117 minutes
- Country: United States
- Language: English
- Box office: $5 million

East of Eden is a 1955 American epic period drama film directed by Elia Kazan and written by Paul Osborn, adapted from the fourth and final part of John Steinbeck's epic 1952 novel.

It stars James Dean as a wayward young man who, while seeking his own identity, vies for the affection of his deeply religious father against his favored brother, thus retelling the story of Cain and Abel. Appearing in supporting roles are Julie Harris, Raymond Massey, Burl Ives, Richard Davalos, and Jo Van Fleet.

Although set in early 20th century Monterey, California, much of the film was actually shot on location in Mendocino, California. Some scenes were filmed in the Salinas Valley. Of the three films in which James Dean played the lead, this is the only one to have been released during his lifetime before he was killed in a car crash six months after its release.

East of Eden, along with Dean's other films Rebel Without a Cause (1955) and Giant (1956), was named one of the 400 best American films of all time by the American Film Institute. In 2016, the film was selected for preservation in the United States National Film Registry by the Library of Congress as being "culturally, historically, or aesthetically significant".

== Plot ==
In 1917, during World War I, in the central California towns of Monterey and Salinas, Cal and Aron are young adult fraternal twins who live in the Salinas Valley with their father, Adam Trask, a farmer and wartime draft board chairman. A deeply religious Christian, Adam told the boys their mother, Kate, died when they were infants. Aron is pious, dutiful, and responsible; while Cal is moody, impulsive, rebellious, embittered, and convinced he is sinful. Cal believes his father loves only his brother Aron. Questioning by nature, Cal discovers his supposedly dead mother, Kate, operates a brothel in nearby Monterey, though he keeps this information from Adam and Aron.

Adam's idealistic plan for a long-haul vegetable shipping enterprise ends disastrously, losing his entire fortune. To recoup his father's loss, hoping to earn his father's love while proving his worth, Cal decides to enter the bean-growing business, predicting that bean prices will skyrocket if the United States enters the war. Stalking Kate, he eventually reveals himself to her, stating that he believes his personality has more in common with her than his father. Going from skepticism to approval as she assesses Cal, Kate reveals that she deserted the family because she hated living on the farm, she never loved Adam, and she rebelled against his complete control. When Adam attempted to stop her leaving, she shot him in the shoulder. Cal then pressures Kate for the $5,000 capital he needs, hinting that he might reveal her past. In lending Cal the money, Kate notes the irony that the loan proceeds from her business are intended to preserve Adam's goodness.

Meanwhile, Aron's girlfriend, Abra, grows attracted to Cal, as she finds they share personality traits, and he reciprocates her feelings. Cal's bean venture is successful, and he intends to give the profits to Adam at a surprise birthday party he and Abra have planned. As the party begins, jealous of Cal's financial present and wary of Cal's growing closeness to Abra, Aron suddenly announces his gift to Adam is his engagement to Abra. While Adam is openly pleased, both Abra and Cal are uneasy due to their growing feelings for each other. When Cal presents the money to his father, Adam refuses it, claiming war profiteering is unethical; as the chairman of the draft board, he may be sending young men to fight. He demands Cal give the money back to the farmers he "robbed." Adam adds that Aron's gift, compared to Cal's, is "honest and...good." A dejected Cal sees his father's refusal as another emotional rejection. When a distraught Cal leaves the room, Abra goes after him. Aron follows and orders Cal to stay away from her. In retaliation, Cal angrily tells the prudish Aron that their mother is alive, then takes him to her Monterey brothel. Cal roughly shoves the stunned Aron at the disapproving elderly Kate, causing her to fall. When Cal arrives home, Adam demands to know where Aron is. Initially responding that he is "not his brother's keeper", Cal then tells Adam what he did.

The truth about his mother drives the pacifistic Aron to get drunk, lose control, and then board a troop train to enlist in the army. When the sheriff informs Adam, he rushes to the station in a futile attempt to dissuade him. Adam fails, watching helplessly as Aron smashes his head through the rail car window, maniacally laughing as the train pulls away. A shocked Adam suffers a stroke, leaving him paralyzed and unable to communicate. Cal tries talking to Adam, who remains unresponsive. Abra pleads with Adam to show Cal some affection before it is too late. When Cal makes his last bid for acceptance before leaving town, Adam manages to speak. He tells Cal to fire the annoying nurse, then whispers something to him. With satisfaction, Cal tells Abra that Adam said he wants only Cal to care for him. Cal sits alone by his father's bedside, the emotional chasm between the father and son beginning to heal. Cal stays to care for him, supported by Abra.

== Cast ==
- Julie Harris as Abra Bacon
- James Dean as Caleb Trask
- Raymond Massey as Adam Trask
- Richard Davalos as Aron Trask
- Burl Ives as Sam (the sheriff)
- Jo Van Fleet as Cathy Ames/Kate Trask
- Albert Dekker as Will Hamilton
- Harold Gordon as Gustav Albrecht
- Nick Dennis as Rantani
- Lois Smith as Anne, Kate's servant
- Timothy Carey as Joe, Kate's henchman (uncredited)
- Barbara Baxley as Adam's nurse (uncredited)
- Richard Garrick as Dr. Edwards (uncredited)
- Lonny Chapman as Roy Turner, the automobile mechanic (uncredited)
- Lester Dorr as City Official at the parade (uncredited)

== Production ==
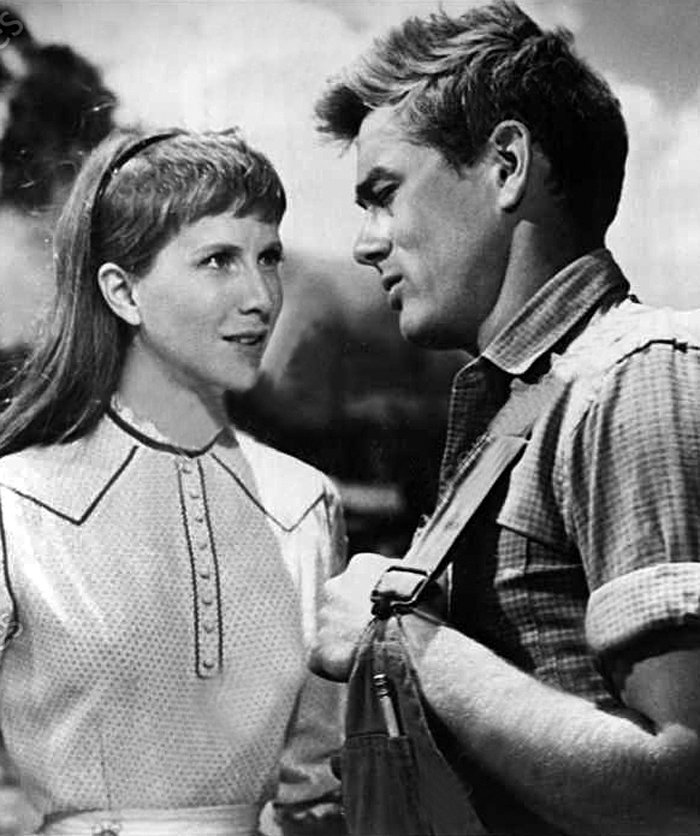
Film still with Harris and Dean.

The film was originally planned to be made in 3-D but Warner Bros. Pictures later announced that it was to be made in WarnerSuperScope instead using Warner's new All-Media camera with no mention of 3-D. It was eventually released in CinemaScope.

Director Elia Kazan first toyed with the idea of casting Marlon Brando as Cal and Montgomery Clift as Aron, but at 30 and 34 years old, respectively, they were simply too old to play teenage brothers. Paul Newman, who was one year younger than Brando, was a finalist for the part of Cal, which eventually was played by James Dean, 23 at the time, who was six years younger than Newman.

Newman and Dean, who were up for the part of Cal, screen tested together for the parts of the rival brothers. In the end, Richard Davalos got the part of Aron. This was his screen debut.

Julie Harris was cast as Abra Bacon. Executive producer Jack L. Warner was opposed to her casting, because she was ten years older than her character.

Kazan denied rumors that he didn't like Dean: "You can't not like a guy with that much pain in him… You know how a dog will be mean and snarl at you, then you pat him, and he's all over you with affection? That's the way Dean was." Kazan did intervene sternly, however, when Dean started to feel his power as a hotly emerging star and treated crew members disrespectfully.

Locations include: Mendocino County, California; Salinas, California; and Salinas Valley, California.

== Release ==
East of Eden received its world premiere at the Astor Theatre in New York City on March 9, 1955, as a benefit for the Actors Studio. The premiere attracted notable female celebrities who acted as usherettes, including Marilyn Monroe, Margaret Truman, Arlene Francis, Carol Channing, Jayne Meadows and Eva Marie Saint.

== Themes and character motivations ==
The underlying theme of East of Eden is a biblical reference to the brothers Cain and Abel. Cal is constantly struggling to earn his father's approval. The relationship between Cal and his father is a stressful one and is not resolved until late in the story, after his father suffers a paralyzing stroke. In his paralyzed state and with the help of Julie Harris' character, Abra, Cal's father finally expresses his suppressed love for the boy.

Other themes touched upon in the film include anti-German xenophobia, specifically as wrought against a local German immigrant as resentment about United States entry into World War I grew. The themes of young love and sibling rivalry are also present in the film, as Aron's girlfriend finds herself increasingly drawn to the more rebellious Cal.

== Critical reaction ==
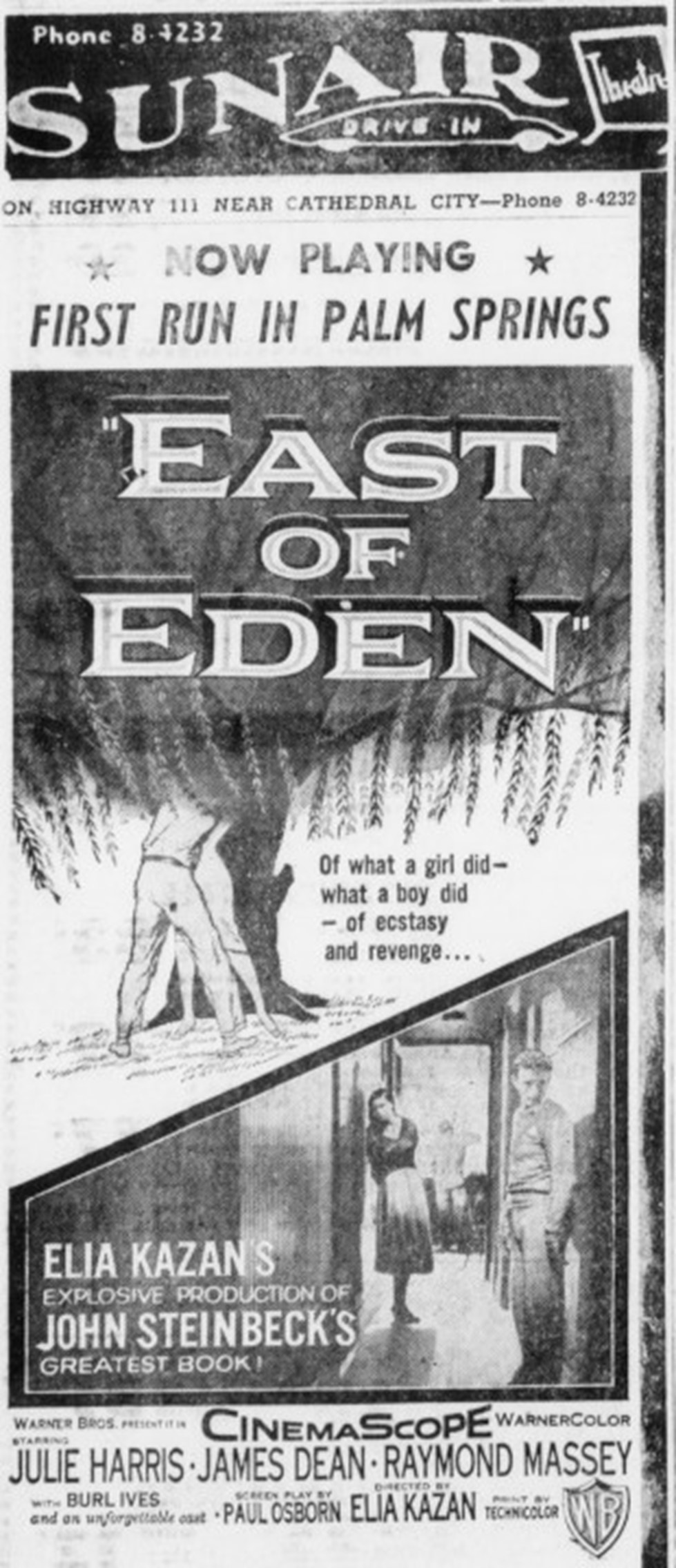
Drive-in advertisement from 1955

Bosley Crowther, writing for The New York Times, described the film as having "energy and intensity but little clarity and emotion"; he notes:

In one respect, it is brilliant. The use that Mr. Kazan has made of CinemaScope and color in capturing expanse and mood in his California settings is almost beyond compare. His views of verdant farmlands in the famous Salinas "salad bowl," sharply focused to the horizon in the sunshine, are fairly fragrant with atmosphere. The strain of troubled people against such backgrounds has a clear and enhanced irony. For the stubborn fact is that the people who move about in this film are not sufficiently well established to give point to the anguish through which they go, and the demonstrations of their torment are perceptibly stylized and grotesque.

Jack Moffitt of The Hollywood Reporter, in a review that appeared after the March 1955 premiere, wrote "Beautifully acted, and superbly directed by Elia Kazan, it is bound to be one of the year’s important contributions to screen literature." Of its star, he wrote:

But the box office asset that is most important is the debut, in the leading role, of a handsome and dynamic young actor named James Dean. This is the boy who is apt to captivate the typical movie fans whether or not they like tragic stories. He is that rare thing, a young actor who is a great actor and the troubled eloquence with which he puts over the problems of misunderstood youth may lead to his being accepted by young audiences as a sort of symbol of their generation. He’s the only player I’ve ever seen who’d be completely right for Romeo. It is inevitable that he will be compared to Marlon Brando, though he is no carbon copy of that capable player.

In 1957 Truman Capote wrote: "…many critics reviewing [the film] remarked on the well-nigh plagiaristic resemblance between [Dean's] acting mannerisms and [Marlon] Brando's." Bosley Crowther called Dean's performance a "mass of histrionic gingerbread" which clearly emulated the style of Brando. Kate Cameron, of the New York Daily News, on the other hand, proclaimed Dean "a new star" who had "walked away with most of the honors." While conceding that he did "sound at times like Marlon Brando," she called him "a fine actor" who "plays his first film role with a naturalness that is completely convincing."

Famed film critic of the time, Pauline Kael, wrote that in East of Eden, Hollywood finally tuned into "American avant-garde" cinema.

In 2005 film critic Kenneth Turan of the Los Angeles Times wrote that East of Eden is "not only one of Kazan's richest films and Dean's first significant role, it is also arguably the actor's best performance." The film's depiction of the interaction between Dean and Massey was characterized by Turan as "the paradigmatic generational conflict in all of American film."

In a short retrospective for The New Yorker in 2012, critic Pauline Kael called the film "An amazingly high-strung, feverishly poetic movie about Cain and Abel as American brothers....It’s far from a dull movie, but it’s certainly a very strange one; it’s an enshrinement of the mixed-up kid. Here and in Rebel Without a Cause, Dean seems to go just about as far as anybody can in acting misunderstood."

In 2013, Dave Kehr of the Chicago Reader praised the adaptation by Kazan and the "down-to-earth" performances of James Dean and Richard Davalos.

As of October 2026, East of Eden holds an 84% fresh rating on Rotten Tomatoes based on 44 reviews, with an average rating of 8.1/10. The critical consensus reads, "East of Eden strains to swell its story to epic dimensions, but James Dean's riveting performance gives this CinemaScope drama much of its raging heart." Metacritic, which uses a weighted average, assigned the film a score of 72 out of 100, based on 11 critics through May 2024, indicating "generally favorable" reviews.

== Awards and nominations ==
Award	Category	Nominee(s)	Result	Ref.
Academy Awards	Best Director	Elia Kazan	Nominated	
Academy Awards	Best Actor	James Dean (Note: Posthumous nomination)	Nominated	
Academy Awards	Best Supporting Actress	Jo Van Fleet	Won	
Academy Awards	Best Screenplay	Paul Osborn	Nominated	
Blue Ribbon Awards	Best Foreign Film	Elia Kazan	Won	
Bodil Awards	Best American Film	Elia Kazan	Won	
British Academy Film Awards	Best Film from any Source		Nominated	
British Academy Film Awards	Best Foreign Actor	James Dean	Nominated	
British Academy Film Awards	Most Promising Newcomer to Film	Jo Van Fleet	Nominated	
Cannes Film Festival	Palme d'Or	Elia Kazan	Nominated	
Cannes Film Festival	Best Dramatic Film	Elia Kazan	Won	
Cinema Writers Circle Awards	Best Foreign Director	Elia Kazan	Won	
Directors Guild of America Awards	Outstanding Directorial Achievement in Motion Pictures	Elia Kazan	Nominated	
Golden Globe Awards	Best Motion Picture – Drama		Won	
Golden Globe Awards	Special Achievement Award	James Dean (Note: Posthumous award)	Won	
Jussi Awards	Best Foreign Actor	James Dean	Won	
Kinema Junpo Awards	Best Foreign Film	Elia Kazan	Won	
National Board of Review Awards	Top Ten Films		2nd Place	
National Film Preservation Board	National Film Registry		Inducted	
Online Film & Television Association Awards	Film Hall of Fame: Productions		Inducted	
Picturegoer Awards	Best Actor	James Dean	Won	
Saturn Awards	Best DVD or Blu-ray Collection	James Dean Ultimate Collector's Collection	Nominated	
Writers Guild of America Awards	Best Written American Drama	Paul Osborn	Nominated	

== Legacy ==
Actor Nicolas Cage said in a 2014 interview that he wanted to go into acting because of Dean and his performance in the film: "I started acting because I wanted to be James Dean. I saw him in Rebel Without a Cause, East of Eden. Nothing affected me – no rock song, no classical music – the way Dean affected me in Eden. It blew my mind. I was like, 'That's what I want to do'," Cage said.

In a 2019 MTV interview, actor Leonardo DiCaprio stated that East of Eden was the film that made him "obsessed with movies". Adding in 2016 when asked about which performances stayed with him the most:

"I remember being incredibly moved by Jimmy Dean, in East of Eden. There was something so raw and powerful about that performance. His vulnerability ... his confusion about his entire history, his identity, his desperation to be loved. That performance just broke my heart."

== See also ==
- List of American films of 1955
- James Dean (2001): biographical film about the life of actor James Dean (played by James Franco), which opens with the behind the scenes making of East of Eden, where Dean is on set performing with Raymond Massey (played by Edward Herrmann) filming the birthday surprise sequence.
