= East of Eden (novel) =

1952 novel by John Steinbeck

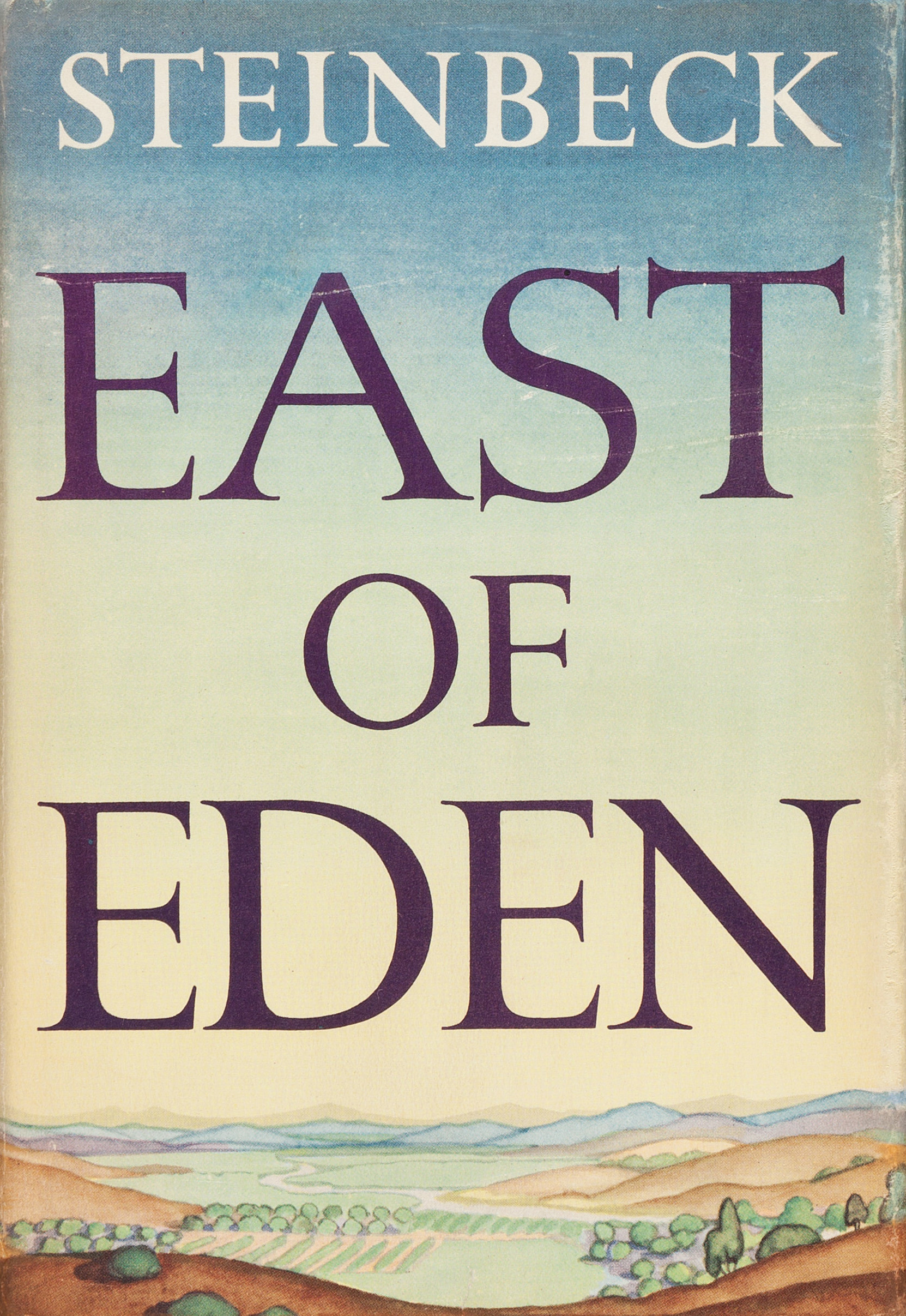
- First edition cover
- Author: John Steinbeck
- Language: English
- Genre: Novel; Family saga
- Set in: Salinas Valley, California, 1862–1918
- Publisher: Viking Press
- Publication date: September 19, 1952
- Publication place: United States
- Media type: Print: hardback
- ISBN: 9780140186390 (1992 paperback edition)
- Dewey Decimal: 813.52
- LC Class: PS3537.T3234

East of Eden is a 1952 family saga novel by American author and Nobel Prize winner John Steinbeck. Many regard the work as Steinbeck's most ambitious novel, and Steinbeck himself considered it his magnum opus. Steinbeck said of East of Eden, "It has everything in it I have been able to learn about my craft or profession in all these years"; the author later said, "I think everything else I have written has been, in a sense, practice for this." Steinbeck originally addressed the novel to his young sons, Thom and John (then 6 and 4 years old, respectively). Steinbeck wanted to describe the sights, sounds, smells, and colors of the Salinas Valley, California, for them in detail.

East of Eden recounts the lives of two families, the Trasks and the Hamiltons, and their interwoven stories. The Hamilton family in the novel is said to be based on Samuel Hamilton, Steinbeck's maternal grandfather, and his family. A young John Steinbeck appears briefly by name in the novel as a minor character.

== Plot ==
In the beginning of East of Eden, before introducing any characters, Steinbeck establishes the setting with a description of the Salinas Valley in Central California. The story is primarily set there, between the beginning of the twentieth century and the end of World War I. The first chapters, except for Chapter 1 and Chapter 2, are set in Connecticut and Massachusetts and go as far back as the American Civil War, serving as backstory for Adam Trask, his brother Charles, their father Cyrus, and Cathy Ames.

=== Synopsis ===
Adam Trask —newly wed with newly inherited wealth from his late father— arrives in California and settles with his pregnant wife Cathy Ames in the Salinas Valley. Without Adam's knowledge, Cathy had tried to abort the pregnancy with a knitting needle. In their new home, she warns Adam that she had not wanted to move to California and plans to leave as soon as she can. Adam dismisses her, saying "Nonsense!"

Cathy gives birth to twin boys, shoots Adam in the shoulder after convincing him to unlock the bedroom door, and flees. Adam survives and falls into a deep depression. His Chinese-American servant, Lee, and his neighbor, the inventive Irish immigrant Samuel Hamilton, rouse Adam out of it enough for him to name his sons Aaron and Caleb.

Lee becomes a good friend and adopted family member and has long philosophical talks with Adam and Samuel, particularly about the story of Cain and Abel. Maintaining that it has been imperfectly translated in English-language Bibles, Lee tells how his relatives in San Francisco, a group of Chinese scholars, spent two years studying Hebrew so that they might discover the moral of the Cain and Abel story. They discover that the Hebrew word timshel means "thou mayest", meaning that human beings are neither compelled to pursue sainthood nor doomed to sin.

Meanwhile, Cathy becomes a prostitute at a respectable brothel in the city of Salinas. She renames herself "Kate Albey", ingratiates herself with the madam, murders her, and inherits the business. She makes her new brothel infamous as a den of sexual sadism and a source of blackmail on the rich and powerful of the Salinas Valley.

Adam's sons, Caleb ("Cal") and Aaron ("Aron") grow up oblivious of their mother's situation. Echoing Cain and Abel, they are opposites: Aron is virtuous and dutiful, Cal wild and rebellious. At an early age, Aron meets a girl, Abra Bacon, from a well-to-do family, and the two fall in love. Although there are rumors around town that Cal and Aron's mother is not dead but is actually still in Salinas, the boys do not yet know that she is Kate.

Inspired by Samuel's inventiveness, Adam starts an ill-fated business venture and loses almost all of the family fortune. The boys, particularly Aron, are horrified that their father is now the town's laughingstock and are mocked by their peers for his failure.

As the boys reach the end of their school days, Cal decides to pursue a career in farming, and Aron goes to college to become an Episcopal priest. Cal, restless and tortured by guilt about his very human failings, shuns everyone around him and takes to wandering around town late at night. During one of these ramblings, he discovers that his mother is alive and the madam of a brothel. He goes to see her, and she spitefully tells him they are just alike. Cal replies that she is simply afraid and leaves.

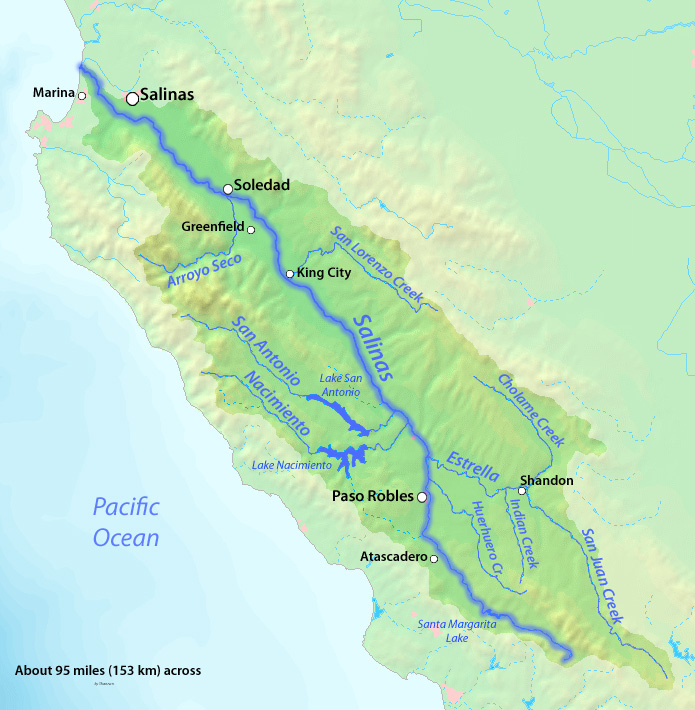
Map of the Salinas Valley. The city of Salinas is at the north end.

Cal goes into business with Samuel's son Will, who is now a successful automobile dealer. Cal's plan is to earn his father's approval and his money back by capitalizing on World War I and selling beans grown in the Salinas Valley to nations in Europe for a considerable profit. He succeeds beyond his wildest expectations and wraps up a gift of $15,000 in cash which he plans to give to Adam at Thanksgiving.

Aron returns from Stanford University for the holiday. There is tension in the air because Aron has not yet told their father that he intends to drop out of college. Rather than let Aron steal the moment, Cal gives Adam the money at dinner, expecting his father to be proud of him. Adam refuses to accept it, however, and tells Cal to give it back to the poor farmers he exploited.

In a fit of rage and jealousy, Cal takes Aron to see their mother, knowing it will be a shock to him. Aron immediately sees Kate for who she is and recoils from her in disgust. Wracked with self-hatred, Kate signs her estate over to Aron and dies by suicide.

Aron, his idealistic worldview shattered, enlists in the Army to fight in World War I. He is killed in action in the last year of the war, and Adam suffers a stroke upon hearing the news from Lee. Cal, who began a relationship with Aron's girlfriend Abra after Aron went to war, tries to convince her to run away with him. She instead persuades him to return home.

Lee pleads with the bedridden and dying Adam to forgive his only remaining son. Adam responds by non-verbally indicating that he forgives Cal and then says "timshel," giving Cal the choice to break the cycle and conquer sin.

== Characters ==
Trask family tree

Alice Trask	Cyrus Trask	Mrs. Trask (unnamed)
Charles Trask	Adam Trask	Cathy Ames (Kate)
Caleb "Cal" Trask	Aaron "Aron" Trask

Hamilton family tree

Samuel Hamilton	Liza Hamilton
George Hamilton	Will Hamilton	Tom Hamilton	Joe Hamilton	Una Hamilton	Lizzie Hamilton	Dessie Hamilton	Olive Hamilton	Mollie Hamilton
John Steinbeck (character and narrator)	Mary Steinbeck

- Other characters: Lee, Abra Bacon, Mr. Edwards, Faye, Ethel, Joe Valery

== Major themes ==
The book explores themes of depravity, beneficence, love, the struggle for acceptance and greatness, the capacity for self-destruction, and of guilt and freedom. It ties these themes together with some references to chapter 4 of the Book of Genesis (the story of Cain and Abel).

Steinbeck's inspiration for the novel comes from the fourth chapter of Genesis, verses one through sixteen, which recounts the story of Cain and Abel. Steinbeck took the title, East of Eden, from Genesis, Chapter 4, verse 16: "And Cain went out from the presence of the Lord, and dwelt in the Land of Nod, on the east of Eden" (King James Version).

Other biblical references in the novel seem to include:

Book of Genesis, Cain and Abel	East of Eden, Charles and Adam	East of Eden, Caleb and Aron
Cain is a "tiller of the ground"; Abel is a "keeper of sheep" (Gen. 4:2, KJV).	Charles is a farmer who works diligently even after he inherits considerable wealth from his father, Cyrus.	Caleb invests in bean crops. Aron studies to become a priest (who are commonly compared with shepherds).
God rejects Cain's gift of crops in favor of Abel's lamb (Gen. 4:3, KJV).	Cyrus prefers the gift from his son Adam (a stray puppy he found) over the gift from his other son Charles (a hard-earned expensive knife).	Adam rejects his son Cal's money and would rather he led a good life like Aron.
After rejection from God, Cain kills Abel (Gen. 4:8, KJV).	After being rejected by their father, Charles attacks Adam and beats him nearly to death. Charles then goes to fetch a hatchet, presumably to murder Adam, but the latter manages to escape.	After Adam rejects Caleb's money, Caleb informs Aron of their mother's brothel. Aron, distraught, enlists in the war and is killed in combat.
God put a mark on Cain to deter others from killing him (Gen. 4:15, KJV).	Charles receives a dark scar on his forehead while trying to move a boulder from his fields.	Caleb is described as having a more dark and sinister appearance than Aron. Also noteworthy is the fact that Adam tells Caleb, timshel, meaning "thou mayest." This implies Caleb may overcome his evil nature because of the "mark" put upon him by God. In begging his forgiveness of his son, Lee also tells Adam "Your son is marked with guilt."
Cain is the only one with progeny.	Adam has two children, but in the novel it's stated that the children may be Charles'.	Aron dies in the war, and Caleb is the only one able to carry on and have children.

In the novel, Adam, Samuel, and Lee have a significant conversation in which they realize that since Abel died before he had children, they themselves may be the descendants of Cain. This is because, although Noah was descended from Seth, it is unclear whether Noah's wife (or his sons' wives) were descended from Seth, Cain, or other of Adam and Eve's many children.

=== Timshel ===
Timshel is a major theme in the novel. However, there is no word timshel in Hebrew; Genesis 4:7 reads timshol (תמשל), the second person singular masculine future indicative form of the verb moshel 'to rule', thus 'you shall/will rule'. In the novel itself, the character Lee explains the meaning of timshel as "Thou mayest."

Daniel Levin explores the nuances of Steinbeck's use of the Hebrew word, investigating potential reasons for and implications of Steinbeck's error in translation.

== Development history ==
As he wrote the novel, Steinbeck went through a number of possible titles for the book, including "The Salinas Valley", the working title from the beginning; "My Valley", after a Texas businessman suggested he make it more universal; "Down to the Valley"; and then, after he decided to incorporate the Biblical allusion directly into the title, "Cain Sign". It was only upon transcribing the 16 verses of Cain and Abel in the text itself that he enthusiastically took the last three words of the final verse, East of Eden:

"And Cain went out from the presence of the Lord and dwelt in the land of Nod on the east of Eden." (Genesis 4:16)

Steinbeck wrote to a friend after completing his manuscript, "I finished my book a week ago. [...] Much the longest and surely the most difficult work I have ever done... I have put all the things I have wanted to write all my life. This is 'the book.' If it is not good I have fooled myself all the time. I don't mean I will stop but this is a definite milestone and I feel released. Having done this I can do anything I want. Always I had this book waiting to be written."

The fictional Hamilton family is loosely based on Steinbeck's own family, with him describing himself as a child five times throughout the book. Olive, the fourth daughter of the Hamilton family is based on Steinbeck's mother, Olive Blanche Hamilton. The character Olive's career as a teacher in the beginning of the book is based off the real Olive's teaching career in Northern California.

Additionally, Steinbeck's affair and eventual marriage and family with singer Gwen Conger (Later Gwyn) spurred inspiration for the book, with Gywn serving as the eventual inspiration for Cathy Ames.

== Publication history ==

East of Eden was first published by Viking Press in September 1952. The first edition had two print runs: 1,500 copies were signed by Steinbeck; the second run was of unsigned copies. In both print runs, there is a spelling mistake on page 281, line 38: "I remember holding the bite of a line while Tom drove pegs and braided a splice." The word "bite" was mistakenly changed from the original word, "bight," during proofreading.

== Reception ==
Upon the release of East of Eden in September 1952, the general reading public took it to heart and quickly propelled it to the number one spot on the fiction best-seller list. In a letter to a friend, Steinbeck wrote "I am getting flocks of letters .... People write as though it were their book."

However, literary critics were not as gracious, calling the novel heavy-handed and unconvincing, especially in its use of Biblical allusion. Many critics found the novel repulsive yet captivating due to its portrayal of violence and sexual sadism. In particular, critics found the character Cathy (and her brutality) to be wildly unbelievable and off-putting. Others found Steinbeck's philosophy to be too strong in the novel and claimed that he was a moralist. According to critics, Steinbeck's portrayal of good and evil was both hyperbolic and oversimplified, especially in the character of Cathy.

Besides criticizing the major themes of the novel, others attacked his construction and narrative. For example, critics were perplexed at a lack of unity in the novel as Steinbeck attempted to incorporate the stories of two families. Many found the first-person narration distracting, as it appears inconsistently throughout the novel. Critics also disparaged the symbolism as obvious, the narrative as disorganized, and the characters as unrealistic.

East of Eden became an instant bestseller in November 1952, a month after it was released, and is considered one of Steinbeck's finest achievements. About 50,000 copies of the novel are sold each year. Its popularity skyrocketed once again in 2003 after being named Oprah's Book Club pick; it gained the top spot on The New York Times Paperback Best Seller list and remains highly popular with the general reading public.

== Adaptations ==
- The book was adapted for cinema in the 1955 film East of Eden by director Elia Kazan, starring James Dean, Julie Harris, Richard Davalos, Raymond Massey, Jo Van Fleet, and Burl Ives. The movie deals only with the fourth and final part of the book; Dean acts the part of Adam's son Cal, while Davalos plays Aron, Cal's twin brother.
- In 1981, ABC produced a miniseries adaptation of the novel. It aired in three installments and starred Karen Allen, Anne Baxter, Hart Bochner, Timothy Bottoms, Sam Bottoms, Bruce Boxleitner, Lloyd Bridges, Howard Duff, Warren Oates, Soon-Tek Oh, and Jane Seymour.
- In 1995, Takarazuka Revue's Flower Troupe staged a musical production of the fourth and final part of the book. The production was written and directed by Tani Masazumi, and starred Maya Miki as Cal and Junna Risa as Abra.
- In 1998, Australian theatre producer Rob Croser of Independent Theatre collaborated with Elaine Steinbeck in a stage production in Adelaide.
- From 2009 onwards, Universal Pictures has made various attempts to schedule production on another film adaptation based on the novel. Previously, one version separate from Universal's version was attempted, with Ron Howard and Paul Attanasio attached. The first attempt under Universal would have been with Tom Hooper directing from a screenplay written by Christopher Hampton, around 2009. In 2013, Gary Ross became attached to the project as writer and director, with Jennifer Lawrence being cast in the role of Cathy Ames shortly thereafter. In April 2014, Ross said that the film will be split into two.
- In 2012, the YouTube channel 'Periods. Films' released a short film parody version of East of Eden starring Penn Badgley.
- In 2015, the Steppenwolf Theater in Chicago adapted the novel for the stage.
- In September 2024, Netflix ordered a seven-episode limited series adaptation of the novel, with Zoe Kazan writing and executive producing and Florence Pugh attached to star and executive produce. The series was released on October 1, 2026.
