= David Levine (executive) =

Canadian entertainment executive

David Levine (Entertainment Executive)
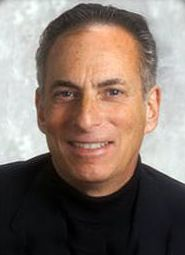
- Levine in 2000
- Occupations: President, promark Music and Television

David Levine is a Canadian entertainment executive.

== Background ==
Levine was born in Montreal. At the start of his career, he was a news broadcaster in Toronto. In the 1970s, he worked at CKGM and CKEY. After several years in this field, he joined Vickers and Benson Advertising in Canada as the director of promotion. Soon thereafter, he became the General Manager of Vickers and Benson’s Analytical Communications, Inc.

In the 1970s, Levine established promark in Canada as a promotions agency.

In 1977, Promark landed the contract to promote a daredevil called "The Human Fly". This project allowed the company to enter into the entertainment industry and the U.S. market. Levine sold the property to Marvel Comics, who turned it into a comic book superhero. Toy rights were sold to Mattel Toys.

In 1978, the Toronto Star described Levine as "a hype artist, a media manipulator, an advertising wizard, a hustler, an exaggerator" working in the "underbelly of the entertainment business".

In the same year, 1978, Levine established Talisman Records. After the release of one single, "Pretty Girls" by Lisa Dal Bello, and one album, he sold Talisman Records to Capitol Records. While promoting Dal Bello, he secured a promotional tie-in with Revlon.

A short time later, he formed Hot Vinyl Records and signed Patsy Gallant and Dwayne Ford to the label.

Since at least 2001, Levine was involved in TV syndication.
