= Jo Van Fleet =

American actress (1915–1996)

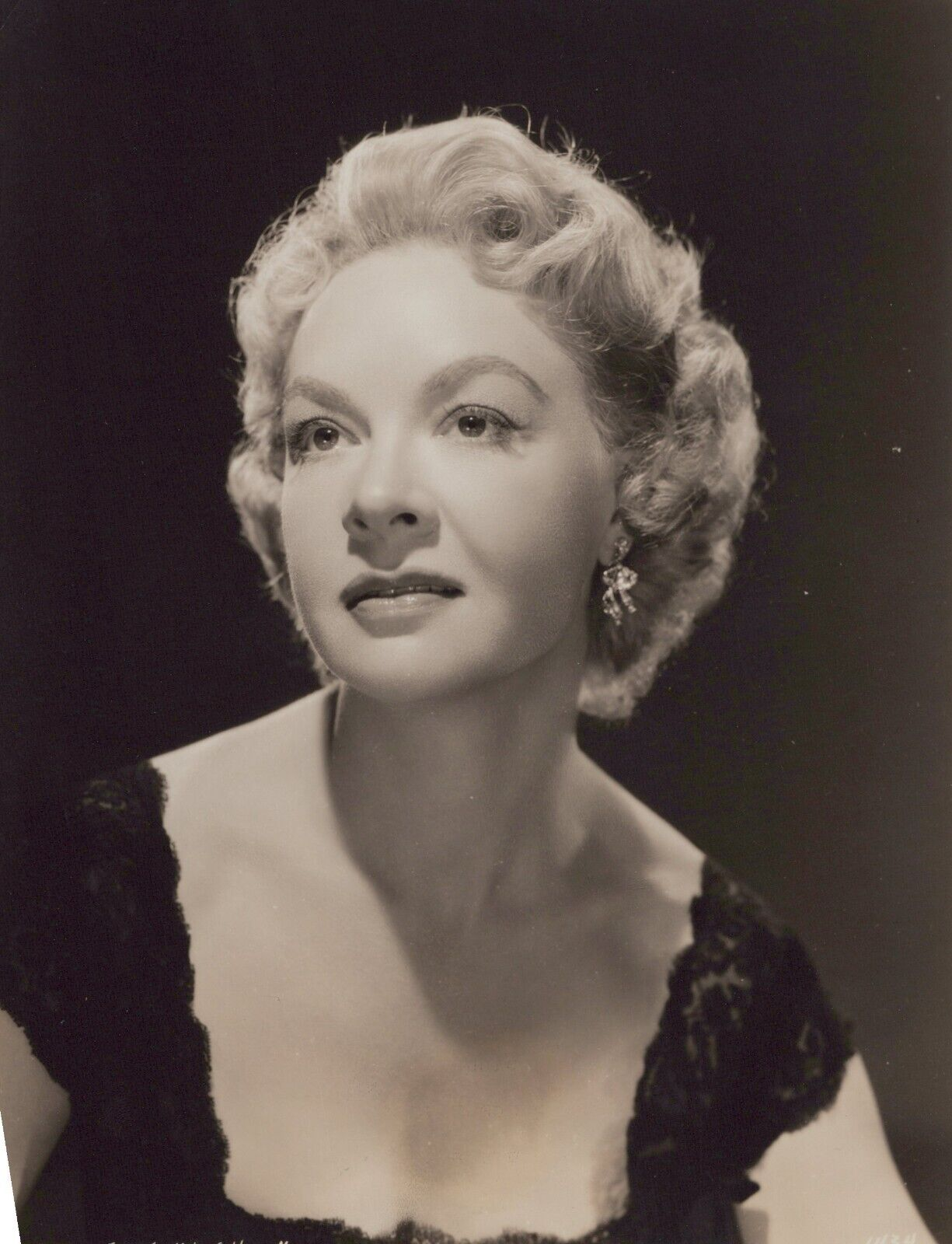
- Jo Van Fleet c.1955
- Born: Catherine Josephine Van Fleet; December 29, 1915; Oakland, California, U.S.
- Died: June 10, 1996 (aged 80); Jamaica, New York, U.S.
- Occupation: Actress
- Years active: 1944–1986
- Spouse: William G. Bales (m. 1946; died 1990)
- Children: 1

Jo Van Fleet (December 29, 1915 – June 10, 1996) was an American stage, film, and television actress. During her long career, which spanned over four decades, she often played characters much older than her actual age. Van Fleet won a Tony Award in 1954 for her performance in the Broadway production The Trip to Bountiful, and the next year she won an Academy Award for Best Supporting Actress for her role in East of Eden.

== Early life and training ==
Josephine Kay Van Fleet was born in 1915 in Oakland, California, the younger of two daughters of Michigan native Roy H. Van Fleet and Indiana native Elizabeth "Bessie" Catherine (née Gardner). Her father Roy worked for the railroads, but died in 1919 of a streptococcus throat infection which was lanced, inadvertently spreading the disease throughout his body. Federal census records show that by age five Josephine, her 18-year-old sister Corinne, and their widowed mother were living in Oakland with Bessie's parents, Ralph and Mary Gardner. To help support herself and her two daughters at her parents' home, Bessie worked as a "sales lady" in an Oakland dry goods store.

While she had an early interest in stage productions, "Jo" graduated from the University of California, Berkeley in 1936, focusing on a variety of subjects, and then spent several years as a high school teacher in Morro Bay, California. She continued her theatrical training in a graduate program at the College of the Pacific in Stockton, California. She moved after her graduation from her masters program to New York City, where she continued her training with Sanford Meisner at the Neighborhood Playhouse.

== Career ==
In 1944, Van Fleet began her professional stage career and immediately distinguished herself in the role of Miss Phipps in the production of Uncle Harry at the National Theatre in Washington, D.C. Two years later, in New York, she distinguished herself as well on Broadway by her performances as Dorcas in Shakespeare's The Winter's Tale; and yet again, in 1950, as Regan opposite Louis Calhern in King Lear. She won the Tony Award for Best Featured Actress in a Play in 1954 for her portrayal of Jessie Mae Watts in Horton Foote's The Trip to Bountiful, costarring Lillian Gish and Eva Marie Saint.

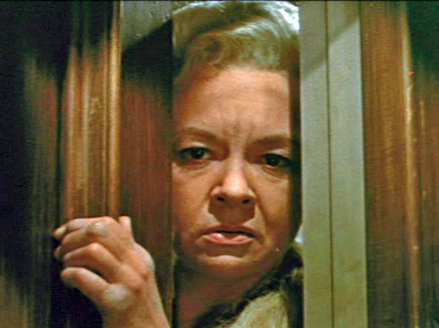
Van Fleet, in her Oscar-winning role, in East of Eden (1955).

Despite her early successes on the stage, Van Fleet continued to refine her skills in the late 1940s and early 1950s by studying with Elia Kazan and Lee Strasberg at the Actors Studio in New York. Kazan in 1952 directed her in the play Flight to Egypt and the following year in Camino Real. In 1954 he encouraged her to work in films in Hollywood. There Kazan cast her in his screen adaptation of John Steinbeck's East of Eden (1955) for Warner Bros. In that production—her film debut—Van Fleet portrays Cathy Ames, the mother of James Dean's character. Her performance, which was widely praised by critics, won her an Academy Award for Best Supporting Actress. Her subsequent film work was steady through 1960 and included films such as The Rose Tattoo (1955), I'll Cry Tomorrow (1955), The King and Four Queens (1956), and Gunfight at the O.K. Corral (1957). Her career, however, did not progress as she had hoped. Her friend and mentor, Kazan, personally experienced her frustrations: "'Jo stagnated, and, since she knew it, was bitter. And as she became bitter, she became more difficult.'" In an interview for the Los Angeles Times after her Oscar-winning performance in East of Eden, Van Fleet openly expressed her concerns "about being typecast in tragic roles".

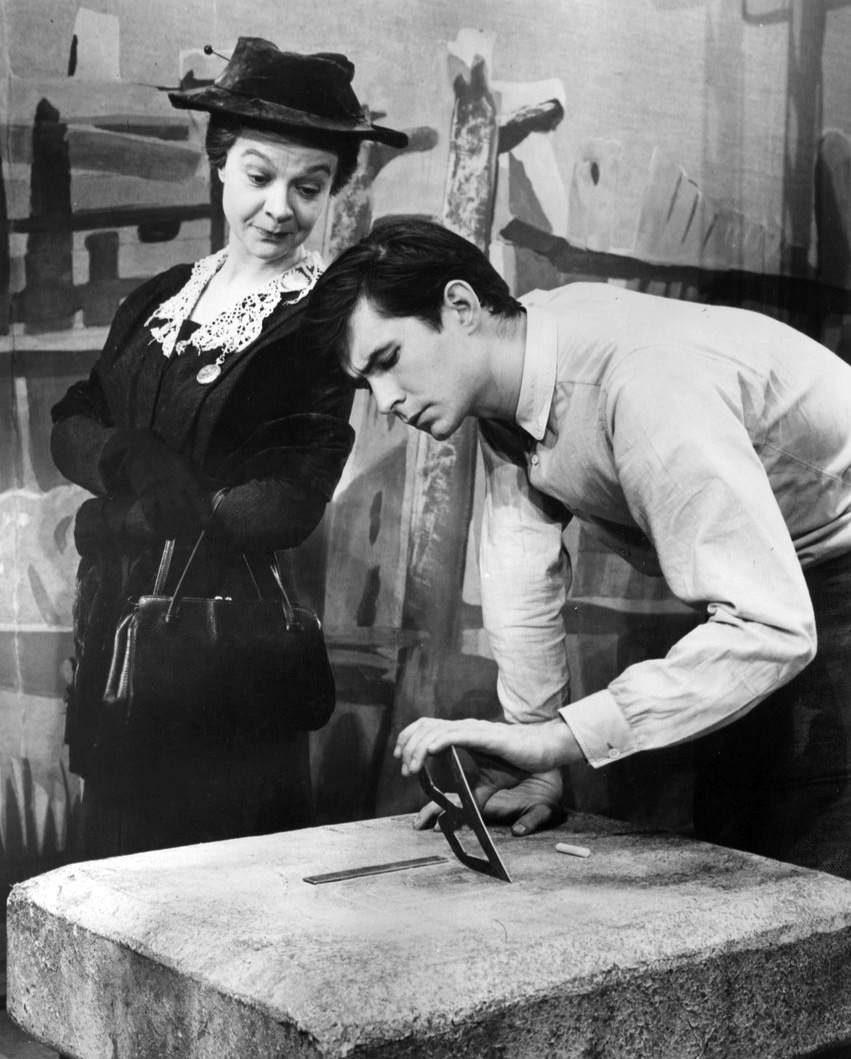
Van Fleet and Anthony Perkins in the Broadway production Look Homeward, Angel (1957).

In 1958, Van Fleet was nominated for a Tony Award for Best Actress in a Play for her performance in Look Homeward, Angel, in which she played the acquisitive mother of Anthony Perkins' character. Her later films included Wild River (1960), one of the productions in which she played a character far older than her actual age. Only age 44 at the time of Wild River, Van Fleet spent five hours every morning getting into make-up for her role as Ella, the 89-year-old matriarch of the Garth family. Some of her other notable roles include the Wicked Stepmother in Rodgers and Hammerstein's Cinderella (1965), Paul Newman's mother in Cool Hand Luke (1967), and Peter Sellers's mother in I Love You, Alice B. Toklas (1968).

Van Fleet's work on television included such series as Naked City, Thriller, Bonanza, The Wild Wild West, Mannix and Police Woman. Among her most emotionally charged dramatic performances on television is her portrayal of the bitter, explosive Mrs. Shrike in the 1956 episode "Shopping for Death" on Alfred Hitchcock Presents.

Van Fleet's final performance, a brief but "delicious" supporting turn in the 1986 TV adaptation of Saul Bellow's Seize the Day, elicited this comment from Washington Post critic Tom Shales:

Jo Van Fleet, who seems even to walk and blink legendarily, has a tiny part and only two small scenes as Mrs. Einhorn, an old woman with two incontinent dachshunds, but what a piquant impression she makes.

== Personal life and death ==
In 1946, Van Fleet married William G. Bales, whose career in modern dance included work as a performer, choreographer, professor at Bennington College, and the founding Dean of Dance at the State University of New York at Purchase, N. Y. They remained together until his death in 1990. The couple had one child, Michael Bales.

In February 1960, in recognition of her career in the motion-picture industry, as well as her work on stage and in television, Van Fleet was awarded a star on the Hollywood Walk of Fame. It is located at 7010 Hollywood Boulevard.

Van Fleet died at age 80 from undisclosed causes in New York City, at Jamaica Hospital in Queens. Her body was cremated and her ashes were returned to her family.

== Filmography ==
Year	Title	Role	Notes
1955	Max Liebman Spectaculars	Aunt Dete	Episode: "Heidi"
1955	Star Tonight	Irene Rankin	Episode: "Concerning Death"
1955	East of Eden	Kate	Academy Award for Best Supporting Actress; Nominated—BAFTA Award for Most Promising Newcomer to Leading Film Roles
1955	The Philco Television Playhouse	Shirley	Episode: "A Business Proposition"
1955	The Rose Tattoo	Bessie	
1955	I'll Cry Tomorrow	Katie Roth	
1956	Kraft Theatre	Ma	Episode: "Snapfinger Creek"
1956	The King and Four Queens	Ma McDade	
1956	Alfred Hitchcock Presents	Mrs. Shrike	Season 1 Episode 18: "Shopping for Death"
1957	Gunfight at the O.K. Corral	Kate Fisher	
1957	This Angry Age	Madame Dufresne	
1957	Alfred Hitchcock Presents	Anna Kaminsky	Season 3 Episode 6: "Reward to Finder"
1958	Westinghouse Desilu Playhouse	Mrs. Lombe	Episode: "The Crazy Hunter"
1959	Alcoa Theatre	Mrs. Weiss	Episode: "30 Pieces of Silver"
1959	General Electric Theater	Miss Wanda Kelsey	Episode: "Disaster"
1960	Wild River	Ella Garth	
1960	Play of the Week	Canina	Episode: "Volpone"
1961	The DuPont Show of the Month	Callie	Episode: "The Night of the Storm"
1961	Alfred Hitchcock Presents	Molly Drake	Season 6 Episode 34: "Servant Problem"
1961	Thriller	Mrs. Cissy Hawk	Episode: "The Remarkable Mrs. Hawk"
1962	Naked City	Dr. Anna Chaloupka	Episode: "The Night the Saints Lost Their Halos"
1962	Frontier Circus	Amelia Curtis	Episode: "The Courtship"
1963	Route 66	Hazel Quine	Episode: "The Stone Guest"
1963	77 Sunset Strip	Jane Patterson	Episode: "Don't Wait for Me"
1964	Summer Playhouse	Velma Clarke	Episode: "Satan's Waitin'"
1964	Kraft Suspense Theatre	Hildy Hesse	Episode: "The World I Want"
1965	Rodgers & Hammerstein's Cinderella	Stepmother	TV movie
1966	The Virginian	Lee Calder	Episode: "Legacy of Hate"
1967	Bob Hope Presents the Chrysler Theatre	Emily Cooper	Episode: "Verdict for Terror"
1967	Cool Hand Luke	Arletta	
1968	I Love You, Alice B. Toklas	Mrs. Fine	
1969	The Wild Wild West	Amelia Bronston	Episode: "The Night of the Tycoons"
1969	80 Steps to Jonah	Nonna	
1970	Mannix	Alexandra Pulvarenti	Episode: "One for the Lady"
1970	Mod Squad	Annie Crabtree	Episode: "'A' is for Annie"
1970	Bonanza	Amy Wilder	Episode: "The Trouble with Amy"
1971	Great Performances	Clara	Episode: "Paradise Lost"
1971	Bonanza	Miss Ellen Dobbs	Episode: "The Stillness Within"
1971	The Gang That Couldn't Shoot Straight	Big Momma	
1971	Medical Center	Margaret	Episode: "Martyr"
1972	The Family Rico	Mama Rico	TV movie
1973	Medical Center	Leah	Episode: "Time of Darkness"
1973	Satan's School for Girls	Headmistress	TV movie co-produced by Aaron Spelling
1976	The Tenant	Madame Dioz	
1977	Police Woman	Irini Karabetas	Episode: "The Buttercup Killer"
1980	Power	Mother Vanda	TV movie
1986	Seize the Day	Mrs. Einhorn	TV movie
