= Salinas Valley =

Valley in Monterey County, California, US

Coordinates: 36.7654°N 121.7918°W

- Valle de Salinas (Spanish)
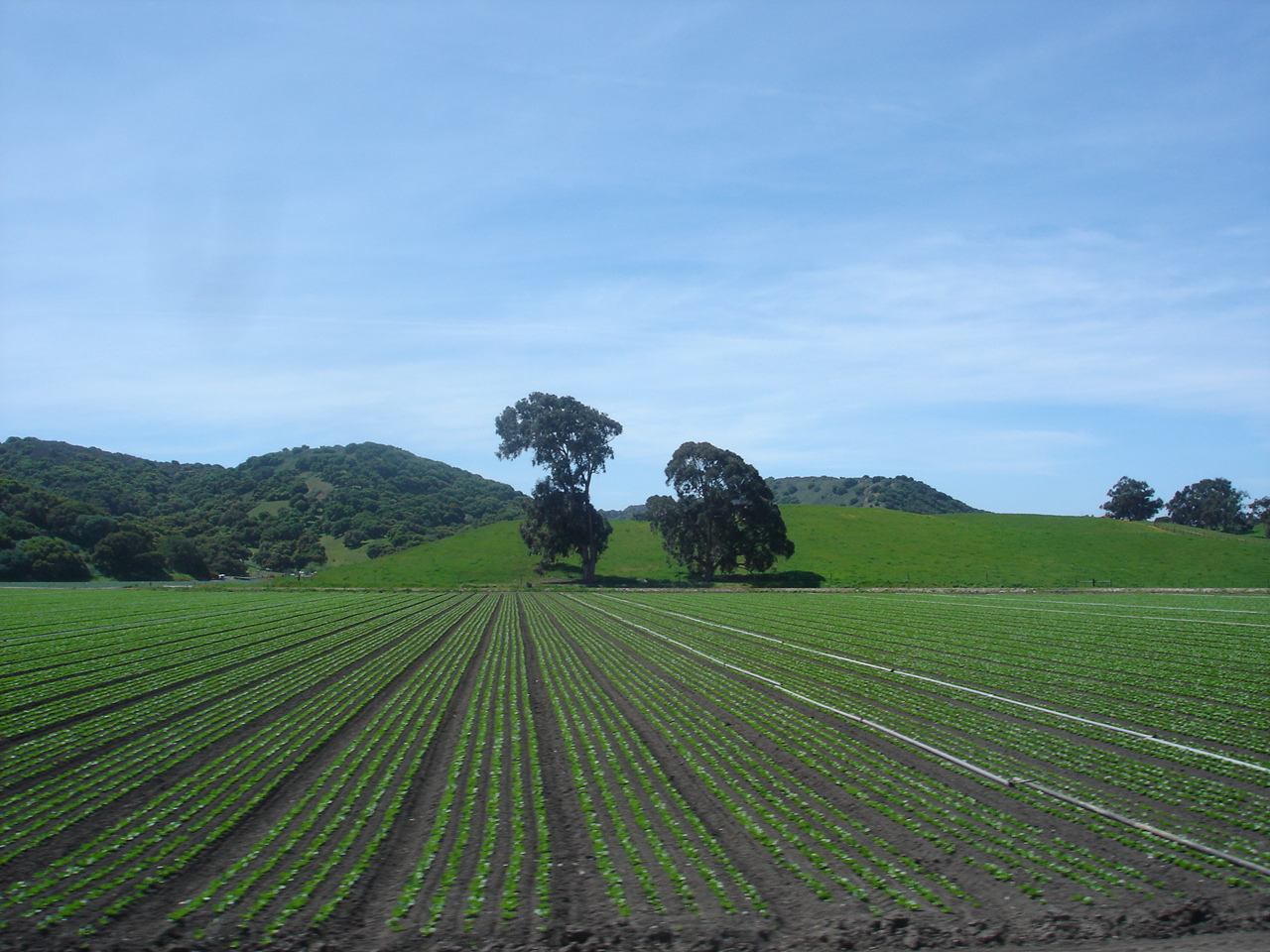
- Salinas Valley, on River Road near Salinas and Marina
- Length: 90 miles (145 km) northwest to southeast

Geography
- Location: California, United States
- Population centers: Castroville, Salinas, King City, San Ardo
- Traversed by: U.S. Route 101
- Rivers: Salinas River
- Interactive map of Salinas Valley

The Salinas Valley is one of the major valleys and most productive agricultural regions in California. It is located west of the San Joaquin Valley and south of San Francisco Bay and the Santa Clara Valley.

The Salinas River, which geologically formed the fluvial valley and generated its human history, flows to the northwest or 'up' along the principal axis and the length of the valley.

The valley was named during the late 18th-century Spanish colonial Alta California period, and in Spanish Salina is the term for a salt marsh, salt lake, or salt pan. The seasonal Salinas River had brackish tule ponds in broad depressed areas, and more salinity during summer and when drought lowered flows.

The valley runs in a southeast to northwest alignment. It begins south of San Ardo, framed by the central inner California Coast Ranges, continues northwestward continuously defined on the west by the Santa Lucia Range, on the east by the Gabilan Range, to its end and the river's mouth at the Monterey Bay.

It is also known for being the setting of the novels East of Eden and Of Mice and Men, both by John Steinbeck.

== Geography ==
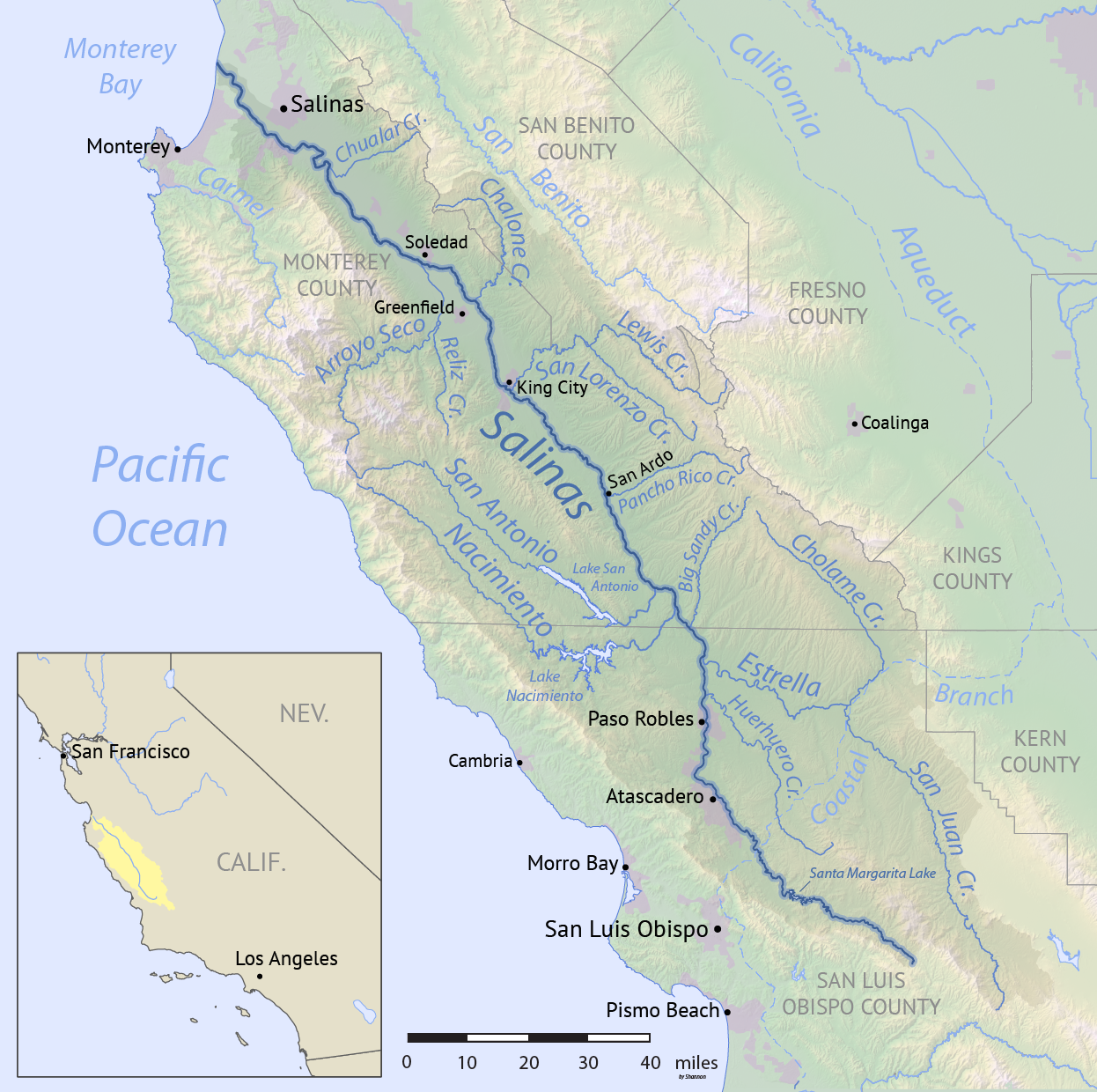
Map of the Salinas River watershed

The Salinas Valley is a broad valley formed by the Salinas River, located in between the Gabilan and Santa Lucia mountain ranges, which border the Salinas Valley to the east and the west, respectively. It runs approximately 90 miles (145 km) southeast from the Salinas River mouth at the Salinas River National Wildlife Refuge, southwest of Castroville, and runs in a generally southeasterly direction as far as the San Ardo Oil Field, beyond which the Salinas River forms a narrow canyon between the two mountain ranges. (The Salinas River's course continues considerably beyond the Salinas Valley, originating in the Santa Lucia Range south of Paso Robles.) The valley lends its name to the geologic province in which it is located, the Salinian Block. The valley's largest city, Salinas, is located near the northern end of the Salinas Valley. Other cities and populated places include Spreckels, Chualar, Gonzales, Soledad, Greenfield, King City, San Lucas, San Ardo, and Bradley.

== History. ==
Before colonization, the valley was inhabited by indigenous Salinans who lived by hunting and gathering and spoke the Salinan language. The Salinan people are believed to have lived south of Junipero Serra Peak, perhaps ranging from Slates Hot Springs on the coast to Soledad in the Salinas Valley and into northern San Luis Obispo County.

The 18th century Spanish colonial mission of Nuestra Señora de la Soledad was located within the Salinas Valley; it would later grow in the city of Soledad. Missions San Antonio de Padua and San Miguel Arcángel were located near to the Salinas Valley and would have included peoples native to that area.

The Franciscans baptized the native population at the missions. The Native Americans had no immunity to European diseases like smallpox and measles, so many died and their culture was devastated. Many of the remaining people assimilated with Spanish and Mexican ranchers in the nineteenth century.

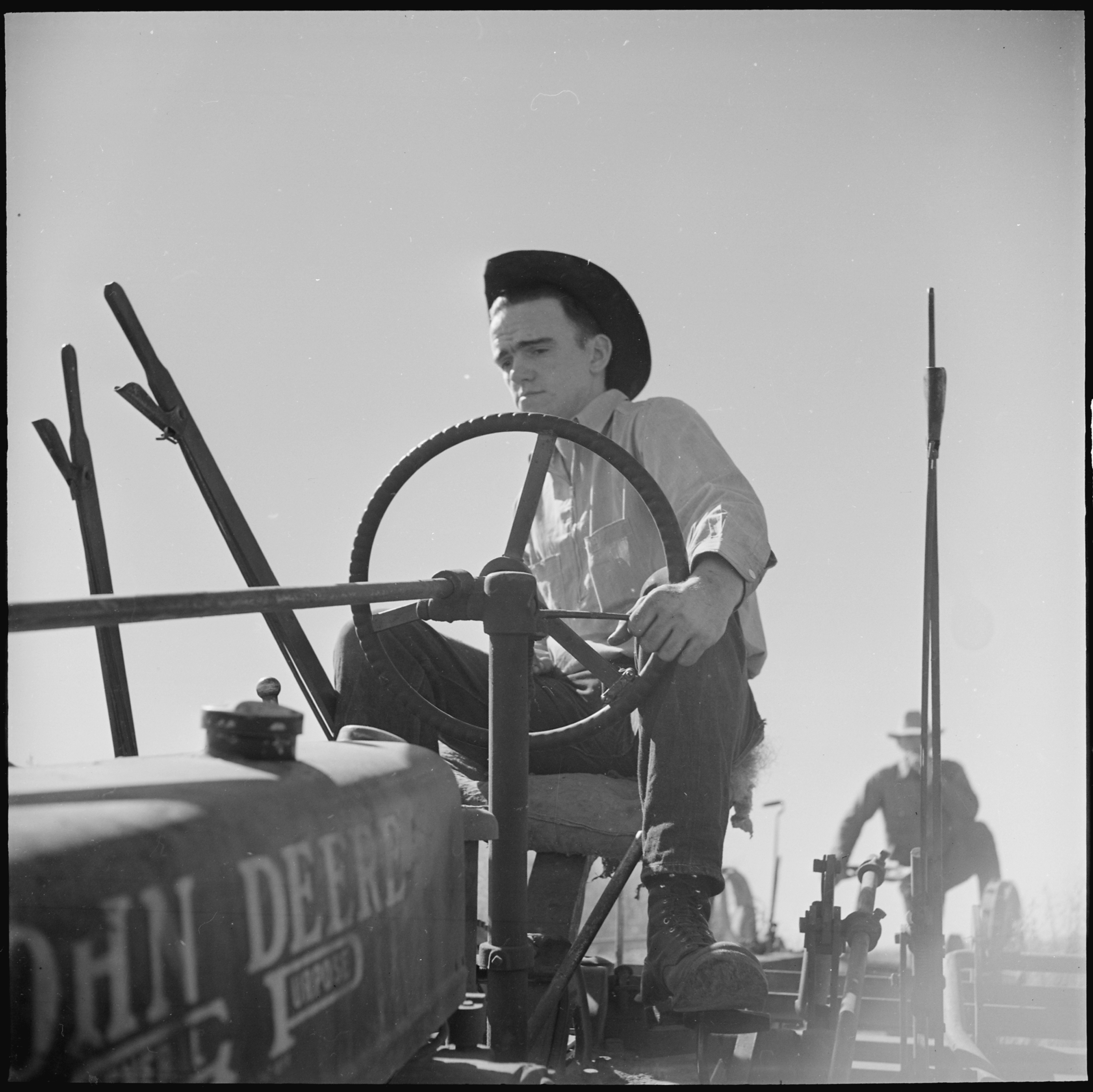
An NYA photo illustrating young farm workers and the mechanization of agriculture

The commercial farming sector of the Dust Bowl era forms the backdrop for several John Steinbeck stories including East of Eden, Tortilla Flat, Of Mice and Men, The Chrysanthemums, and Johnny Bear.

At a railroad crossing about one mile south of Chualar, a bus carrying Mexican migrant workers collided with a train in September 1963, killing 32 passengers and injuring 25. It was the most serious road accident in U.S. history, and helped spur abolition of the bracero program.

== Agriculture. ==
Agriculture dominates the economy of the valley. A large majority of the salad greens consumed in the U.S. are grown within this region. Strawberries, lettuce, tomatoes, and spinach are the dominant crops in the valley. Other crops include broccoli, cauliflower, wine grapes, artichokes, and celery. Due to the intensity of local agriculture, the area has earned itself the nickname "America's Salad Bowl." The flower industry, grown in greenhouses, is now dominated by Matsui Nursery, which has been a major philanthropic benefactor to Salinas.

Salinas Valley is also an important viticultural area. Three American Viticultural Association "American Viticultural Area" domains are located within Salinas Valley: the Arroyo Seco AVA, the Santa Lucia Highlands AVA, and the Monterey AVA.

Although agriculture forms an economic base, more than 100 manufacturing firms call Salinas home. Some of the largest employers in the area include: Dole Fresh Vegetable, the County of Monterey, and Salinas Valley Memorial Hospital.

== Water. ==
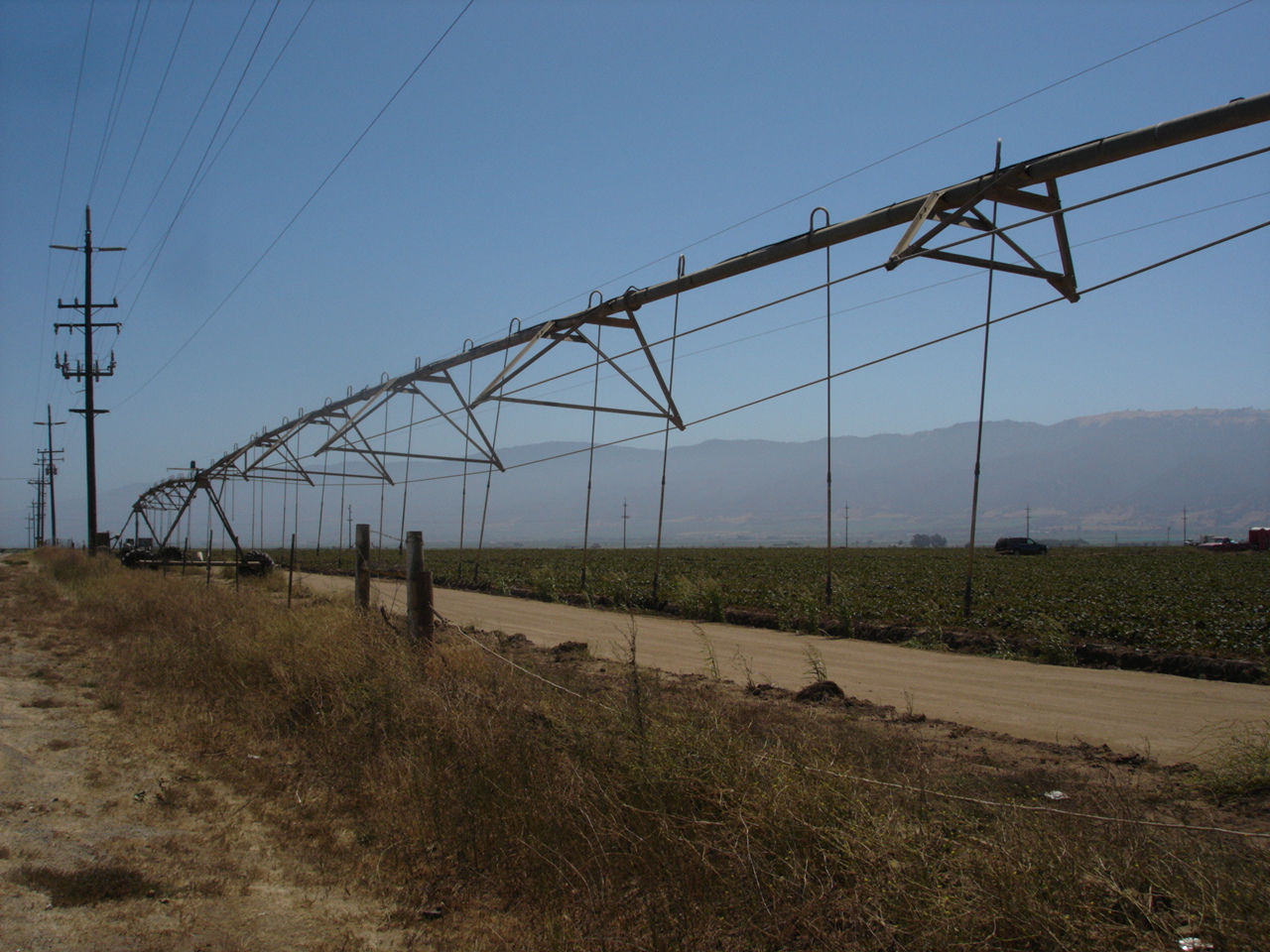
An agricultural irrigation system near Chualar in the Salinas Valley

Supplying Salinas Valley farms is an underground water supply fed, in part, by the large watershed in surrounding mountains. Two reservoirs – Nacimiento and San Antonio—store and release the water for groundwater recharge, flood control and farming. Wells access the groundwater to irrigate about 275,000 acres (1,110 km^{2}) of fruits and vegetables and to supply the valley cities. The Salinas River itself is a sand river, so water appears on the surface only during heavy rains or when water is released from the upstream reservoirs.

Increasing demand for water near the mouth of the valley is drawing seawater into the freshwater aquifer. The Salinas Valley Water Project, now under construction by the Monterey County Water Resources Agency, will use an inflatable dam near Salinas to capture more water during wet periods. Monterey County Water Recycling Projects, a combination of the Castroville Seawater Intrusion Project and the Salinas Valley Reclamation Project, started delivering recycled water to fields near Castroville in 1998. The project's goal is to reduce pumping of groundwater and slow down seawater intrusion.

== Climate. ==
The Salinas Valley's weather varies from north to south. Proximity to Monterey Bay and the cool coastal waters of the Pacific cools the northern part of the valley in summer, and keeps it relatively mild in winter. The southern portion of the valley has greater extremes of temperature, hotter in summer, and colder in winter.

In summer, inland heating creates a thermal low that draws the marine layer into the valley, with fog and low clouds near Monterey Bay, sometimes extending farther down the valley.

The climate is ideal for the numerous vineyards in the Santa Lucia Highlands, promoting growth of winetasting along the River Road Wine Trail.

== Local events. ==
The California Rodeo Salinas, California International Airshow, the National Steinbeck Center, and the Steinbeck Festival are major attractions in Salinas.

=== 2007 Salmonella outbreak ===
On August 30, 2007, 8,000 cartons of spinach (from Metz Fresh, a King City-based grower and shipper, Salinas Valley, California) were recalled after Salmonella was discovered on routine testing. The incident led to a call from some consumer advocates and lawmakers for greater oversight in food safety, even if 90% of the suspect vegetable did not reach the shelves.
