= King City station =

King City station may refer to:

== Transportation ==
- King City GO Station, Ontario, Canada
- King City station (Southern Pacific Railroad), California, United States
- King City Multimodal Transportation Center, California, United States

== Other ==
- King City weather radar station

== See also ==
- King station
