= KRKC =

KRKC may refer to:

- KRKC (AM), a radio station (1490 AM) licensed to King City, California, United States
- KRKC-FM, a radio station (102.1 FM) licensed to King City, California, United States
