= California county routes in zone G =

Overview of roads and highways in the seventh state class

- Example of a California county route shield

Highway names
- County: County Route X (CR X) or Route X

System links
- County routes in California

There are 21 routes assigned to the "G" zone of the California Route Marker Program, which designates county routes in California. The "G" zone includes county highways in Monterey, San Benito, San Luis Obispo, Santa Clara, and Santa Cruz counties.

== G1 ==
County Road G1
- Location: San Benito County
- Length: 5.42 mi (8.72 km)
- Existed: 1958–present

County Route G1 (CR G1) is a road in San Benito County, California, United States, providing access to Fremont Peak State Park from State Route 156 in San Juan Bautista. It is signed as San Juan Canyon Road for almost the entire length except for a small portion of The Alameda.

=== Route description ===
Though some maps mark G1 as extending about 10.8 miles (17.4 km) from Fremont Peak State Park's main parking lot to State Route 156, officially the county route is only 5.42 miles (8.72 km) from near its intersection with Hillside Drive.

From the southern end on Fremont Peak as San Juan Canyon Road, the road begins a steep, sharp-curved winding descent from around 3,000 feet (910 m) for the first 2 miles (3.2 km), north to northeast. G1 then curves to the west for about 2 miles (3.2 km) before turning north; the G1 designation officially begins in this westbound segment at a point near its intersection with Hillside Drive. At the intersection of Mission Vineyard Road, G1 becomes The Alameda, which then heads north for approximately 0.4 miles (0.64 km) before reaching the northern terminus at State Route 156. Beyond the northern terminus, The Alameda continues into downtown San Juan Bautista for 0.2 miles (0.32 km) until the intersection of First Street.

=== Major intersections ===
The entire route is in San Benito County.

Location	mi	km	Destinations	Notes
Fremont Peak State Park	0.00	0.00	Southern terminus of San Juan Canyon Road at the park's main parking lot	
	5.38 0.00	8.66 0.00	Official southern terminus of CR G1	
	5.00	8.05	Mission Vineyard Road	North end of San Juan Canyon Road; south end of The Alameda
San Juan Bautista	5.42	8.72	SR 156	Northern terminus; road continues north as The Alameda
1.000 mi = 1.609 km; 1.000 km = 0.621 mi

== G2 ==
County Road G2
- Location: Santa Clara County
- Length: 9.7 mi (15.6 km)
- Existed: 1962–present

County Route G2 (CR G2), more commonly known as Lawrence Expressway and Quito Road, is a busy 9.7-mile (15.6 km) long north–south link through Silicon Valley in Northern California. The majority of G2 is part of the Santa Clara County expressway system.

=== Route description ===
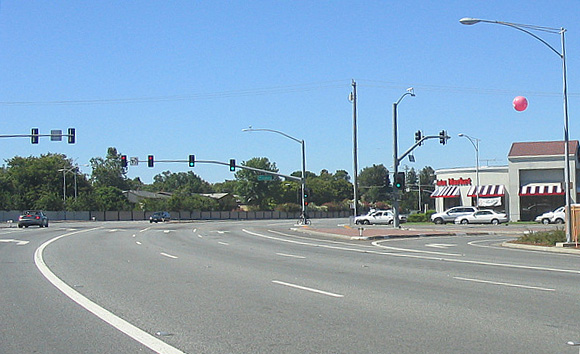
Intersection of Lawrence Expressway and Prospect Road in San Jose, California

G2 runs from the Quito Road overcrossing of SR 85 in Saratoga, north along Quito Road. G2 is not signed along this section and is not commonly recognized as existing along this 2 lane road by either locals or mapmakers. The Quito Road portion is also maintained by the City of Saratoga rather than Santa Clara County.

As the road leaves Saratoga and enters San Jose, it widens to a 6 lane county-maintained expressway with a concrete island divider; at this point it becomes Lawrence Expressway. The Lawrence Expressway section from just south of Saratoga Avenue is more readily recognized as G2. Local residents refer to G2 as Lawrence Expressway. The road continues north, with access usually restricted to major intersections which are controlled via traffic lights.

Lawrence Expressway continues north and intersects with I-280 and Stevens Creek Boulevard over a complex shared separated grade crossing: the expressway proceeds under I-280 before immediately rising over Stevens Creek Boulevard. San Tomas Expressway and Campbell Avenue also share ramps for access to I-280 with the exception of the onramp to Southbound I-280 which is accessed directly from Lawrence Expressway. Lawrence Expressway continues north into Santa Clara and widens to 8 lanes with an HOV lane occupying the far right lane.

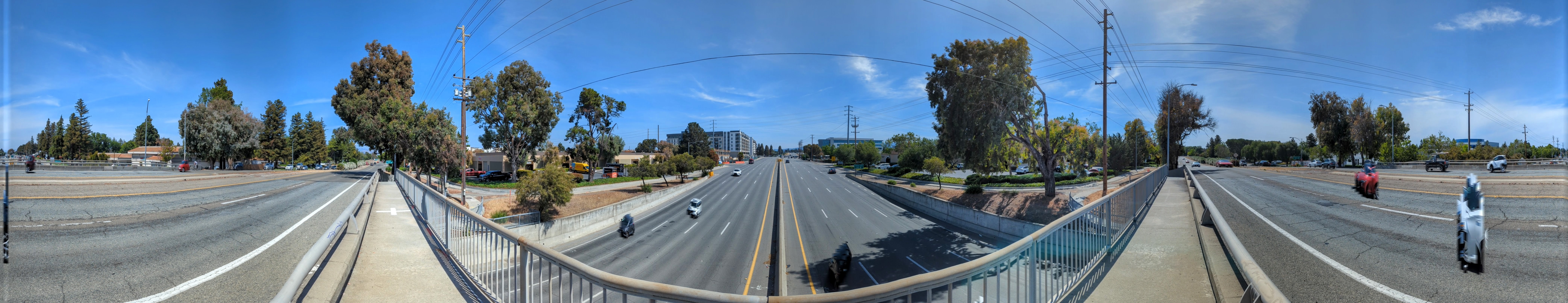
Lawrence (looking south, center) at Central Expressway

Lawrence Expressway also has another separated grade interchange with El Camino Real (SR 82). It then enters Sunnyvale. At this point the expressway passes over Caltrain's Lawrence Station. It also passes under Central Expressway (G6) on a separated grade interchange and over US 101 on a separated grade interchange. The US 101 interchange was upgraded in the early 2000s to include traffic light control on G2.

G2 reaches its northern terminus at the end of Lawrence Expressway at the SR 237 Freeway. The physical road continues north as Caribbean Drive, which then curves back south through Sunnyvale and Cupertino, paralleling Lawrence Expressway under several different street names until the roads intersect again at Highway 9 and Quito. This effectively makes the road one continuous counterclockwise loop through the Santa Clara Valley, where one driver could start on Quito Road and end up exactly where they started without ever changing lanes.

=== History ===
The designation G2 traces back to the 1950s. The route replaced what was originally called Lawrence Station Road (after the Southern Pacific Lawrence station), from Mountain View–Alviso Road in the north to Stevens Creek Blvd. on the south, roughly paralleling Saratoga Creek. Lawrence Station was itself named for Alfred Chester Lawrence. Crossing Stevens Creek, the route was originally called Doyle Road, a small two lane road up to the point the current Doyle Road exits to the east. The section between Doyle and Saratoga Avenue at Quito Road was originally orchards.

G2 was first signed as a Santa Clara County Route in 1962 as construction was completing on sections of the upgrade to an expressway. County Route G2 was originally planned to link up with SR 85 when it was built. At the time of G2's inception SR 85 was in the early planning stages and an interchange had been envisioned at Quito Road. However, opposition to the freeway was intense in Saratoga and the planned interchange between SR 85 and G2 along with an interchange further north at Prospect Road were abandoned in favor of the existing Saratoga Avenue interchange. G2 is unsigned from SR 85 to Saratoga Avenue along Quito Road. North of Saratoga Avenue, Lawrence Expressway is currently signed as G2.

In the 1990s Lawrence Expressway was widened north of I-280 to 8 lanes to accommodate an HOV carpool lane.

As of 2019, Santa Clara County is planning a major grade separation project at Homestead Road. This will be one of the largest expressway improvement projects in many years.

=== Major intersections ===
The entire route is in Santa Clara County.

Location	mi	km	Destinations	Notes
Saratoga			Overpass over SR 85; no access	Southern terminus; road continues as Quito Road
Saratoga			North end of Quito Road; south end of Lawrence Expressway	
San Jose			Saratoga Avenue	
San Jose			I-280 south (Junipero Serra Freeway) – San Jose	Interchange; I-280 north exit 9A
San Jose–Santa Clara line			Stevens Creek Boulevard to I-280 north (Junipero Serra Freeway) – San Francisco	Interchange
Santa Clara			El Camino Real (SR 82)	Interchange; former US 101
Santa Clara–Sunnyvale line			Central Expressway (CR G6)	Interchange
Sunnyvale			US 101 (Bayshore Freeway) – San Francisco	Interchange; former US 101 Byp.; US 101 exit 394
Sunnyvale			SR 237 (Southbay Freeway) – Mountain View, Milpitas	Interchange; northern terminus; SR 237 exit 5; road continues as Caribbean Drive
1.000 mi = 1.609 km; 1.000 km = 0.621 mi

== G3 ==
County Road G3
- Location: Santa Clara County
- Length: 4.52 mi (7.27 km)
- Existed: 1962–present

Animation of USGS maps of 1953, 1961, 1969, 1974, and 2015, showing the conversion of Oregon Avenue to Oregon Expressway, and its interchange with Alma Street and connection to Page Mill Road. In 1953, Oregon Avenue had a T intersection with Alma Street, while Page Mill Road and California Avenue had level crossings across the Southern Pacific railroad tracks. By 1961, the left-jog underpass connection between Page Mill Road and Oregon Avenue had been made, but Oregon was still a narrow residential street, which connected to US-101 so it became a very busy route to Stanford and the Stanford Industrial Park. By 1969, the Oregon Expressway had replaced about 90 homes on the south side of Oregon Avenue. By 1974, more ramps were added to the Alma Street interchange. At some point, by 2015, the railroad tracks behind the Sutter Packing Company cannery / Maximart / Fry's building were gone (where the 2015 map says "Mayfield"); this was the track that connected the Peninsular Railway route that ran along what became Foothill Expressway.

County Route G3 (CR G3), more commonly known as Page Mill Road and Oregon Expressway, is a short 4.5-mile (7.2 km) northeast–southwest arterial route that spans the lower peninsula region of the San Francisco Bay Area from I-280 to US 101. G3 runs through Palo Alto and unincorporated Stanford University lands. It is part of the Santa Clara County expressway system.

=== Route description ===
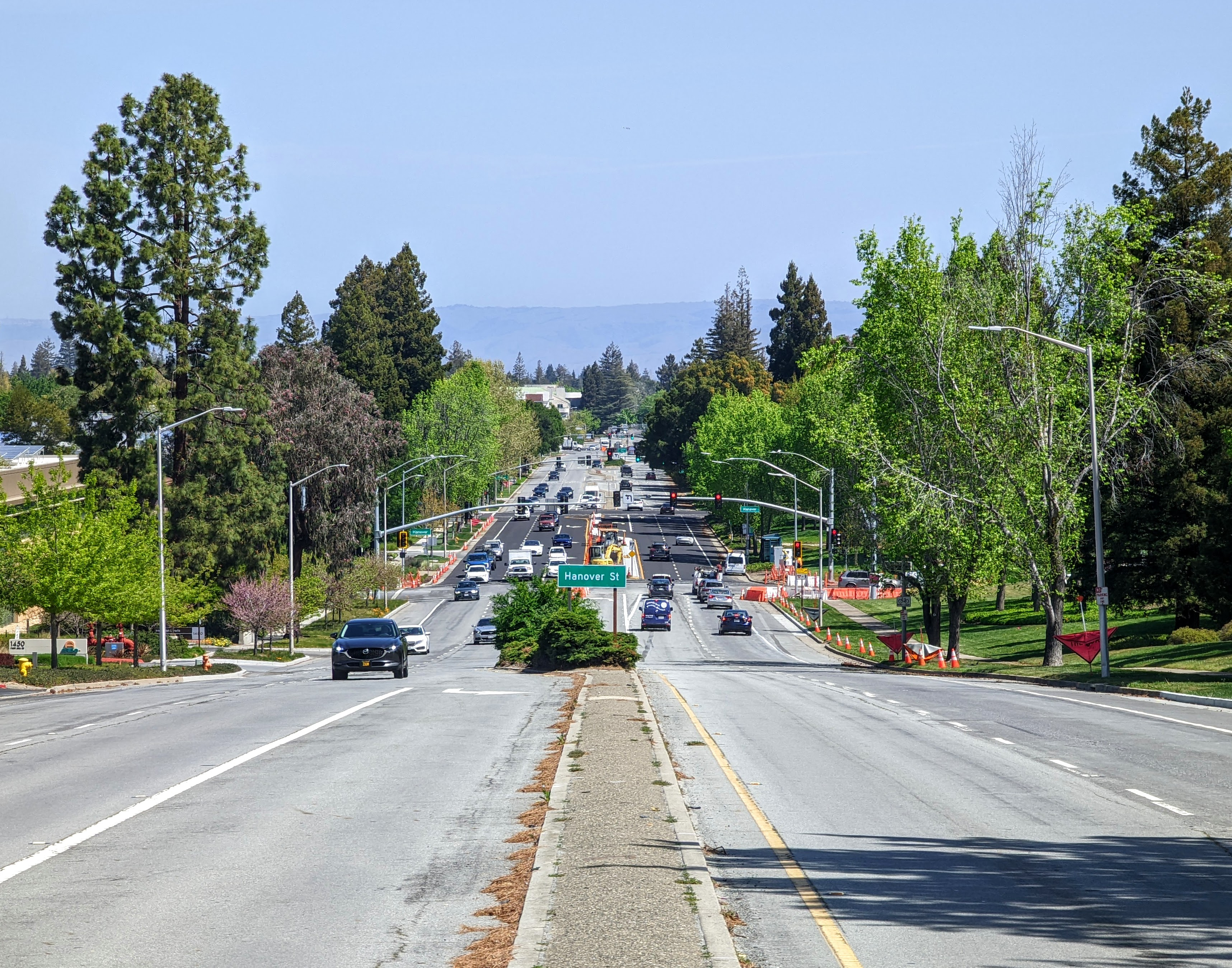
Page Mill Road heading downhill toward Hanover Street and El Camino Real

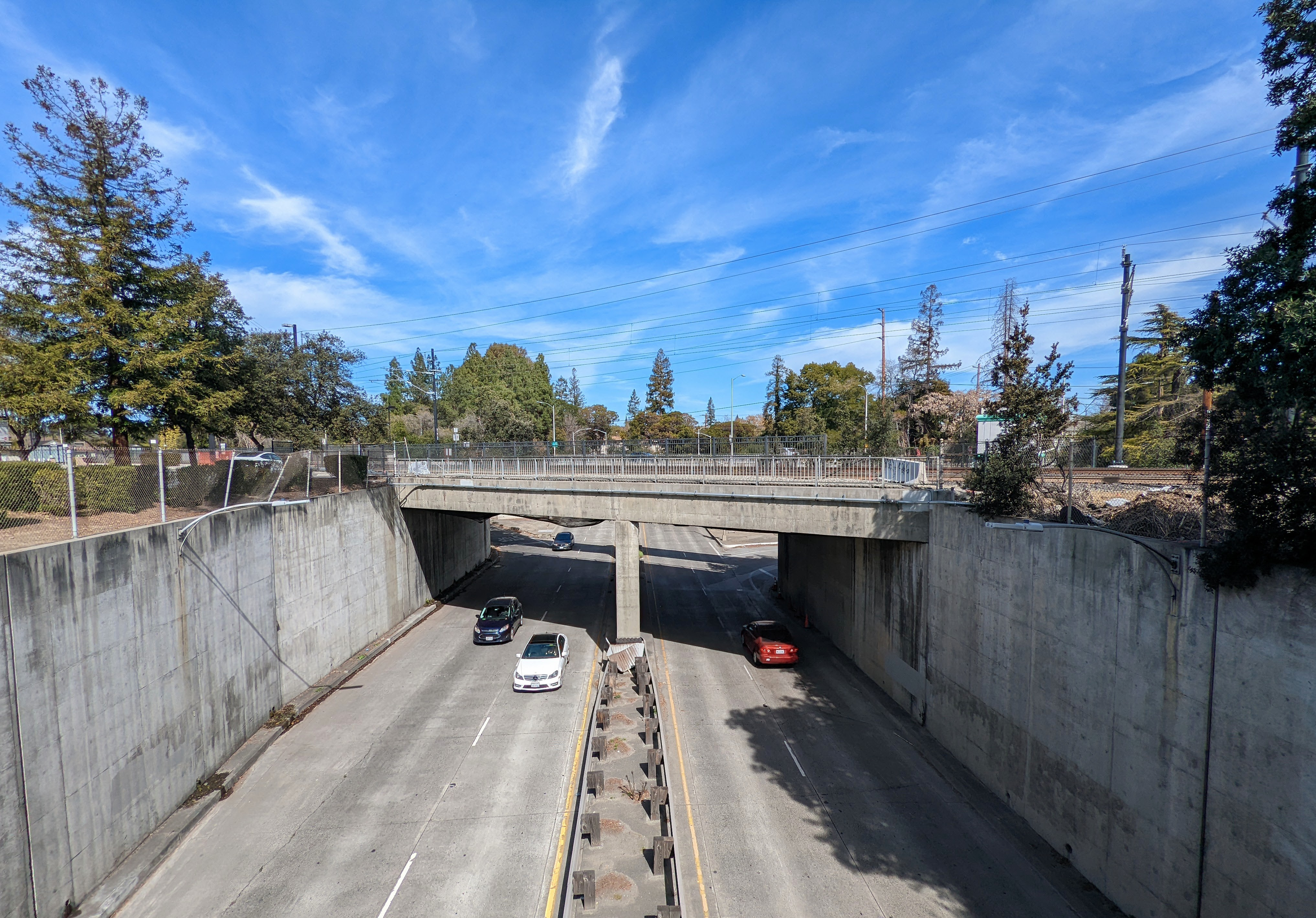
Oregon Expressway where it goes under Park Blvd., the Caltrain tracks, and Alma Street (which is also the start of G6)

CR G3 begins in the west at its interchange with I-280, at the Los Altos Hills–Stanford border. It proceeds northeast as a four lane expressway over the rolling hills of Stanford University until it reaches Foothill Expressway (G5), at which it has an at-grade intersection. East of Foothill Expressway, G3 descends down into the more urban areas of the lower peninsula, going through the industrialized area of the Stanford Research Park located in Palo Alto. The road along this section has a reduced speed limit and several turnoffs along its length until it reaches El Camino Real (SR 82).

After SR 82, G3 branches from Page Mill Road (which becomes a narrow access road to the California Avenue Station), and curves under the Caltrain tracks, continuing as Oregon Expressway for the remainder of its northeastward journey. Oregon Expressway functions more comparably to a County-maintained Arterial Road for Palo Alto, with frequent signaled intersections and a posted speed limit of 35 MPH. G3 reaches its eastern terminus at its junction with US 101, where it shares an interchange with Embarcadero Road.

Page Mill Road (no longer designated G3) continues southwest of I-280 for 6 miles (9.7 km), a twisting two-lane road that climbs to Skyline Boulevard (SR 35) at the crest of the Santa Cruz Mountains. It passes the entrance to Palo Alto's Foothills Park, and the Monte Bello and Los Trancos Open Space Preserves. Under the name West Alpine Road, the road descends west of Skyline Boulevard to a turn-off that leads to Portola Redwoods State Park, where the original Page sawmill was located. Other than a commemorative sign, no artifacts remain at the mill site, which is accessible only by Slate Creek Trail from either Portola Redwoods state park or from Skyline Boulevard (SR 35).

=== History ===
This route was designated in 1962. G3 is currently signed its entire length. Page Mill Road was originally known as Mayfield–Pescadero Road, but only the urbanized portion of Page Mill Road is part of G3.

The widening of Oregon Avenue from a congested narrow residential street to a median-divided 4-lane Oregon Expressway was narrowly approved by Palo Alto voters in a June 5, 1962, election; about 90 homes on the south side of Oregon Avenue were moved or destroyed to make room for it. The original Oregon Ave still exists on the north side of the roadway, though is mostly separated from G3 with trees and shrubbery.

Due to the steep grade and high water table around the area of the Caltrain underpass, the underpass is notorious for flooding during heavy rains, which often overwhelmed the county pumps which were installed due to the existence of a Superfund site 1/4 mile upstream on Page Mill road. When the underpass is closed due to flooding, through traffic must detour onto Alma Street (Route G6) and cross the train tracks at either Churchill Ave to the North, or Charleston Rd to the south.

When Interstate 280 was completed through the area in 1969, the old narrow Page Mill road, which passed by the Frenchman's Tower, was bypassed over the hills to the south and expanded to 5 lanes from 2. The old road was renamed "Old Page Mill Road", the center line was removed, and car access was limited to eastbound and local traffic only. The road is still traversable today and is a popular route for bicyclists.

In 2014, the county began a rehabilitation project on Oregon Expressway, which entailed rebuilding and landscaping of the center median, installation of new traffic lights and mast arms, and repaving of the travel lanes. The intersection of Ross and Oregon, previously an uncontrolled intersection, had new traffic signals and sensors installed and Ross was converted into a Bike Boulevard.

=== Major intersections ===
The entire route is in Santa Clara County.

Location	mi	km	Destinations	Notes
Los Altos Hills–Santa Clara County line			I-280 (Junipero Serra Freeway) – San Francisco, San Jose	Interchange; southern terminus; I-280 exit 20; road continues as Page Mill Road
Palo Alto–Stanford line			Foothill Expressway (CR G5) / Junipero Serra Boulevard	
Palo Alto			SR 82 (El Camino Real)	North end of Page Mill Road on CR G3; south end of Oregon Expressway
Palo Alto			Page Mill Road / Park Boulevard / Birch Street – Business District	Interchange
Palo Alto			Alma Street (CR G6)	Interchange
Palo Alto			US 101 (Bayshore Freeway) – San Francisco, San Jose	Interchange; northern terminus; US 101 exit 402; connects to Embarcadero Road
1.000 mi = 1.609 km; 1.000 km = 0.621 mi

== G4 ==
County Road G4
- Location: Santa Clara County
- Length: 14.11 mi (22.71 km)
- Existed: 1962–present

County Route G4 (CR G4), more commonly referred to as San Tomas Expressway and Montague Expressway is a busy 14.5-mile (23.34 km) long link across Silicon Valley. G4 is part of the Santa Clara County expressway system.

=== Route description ===
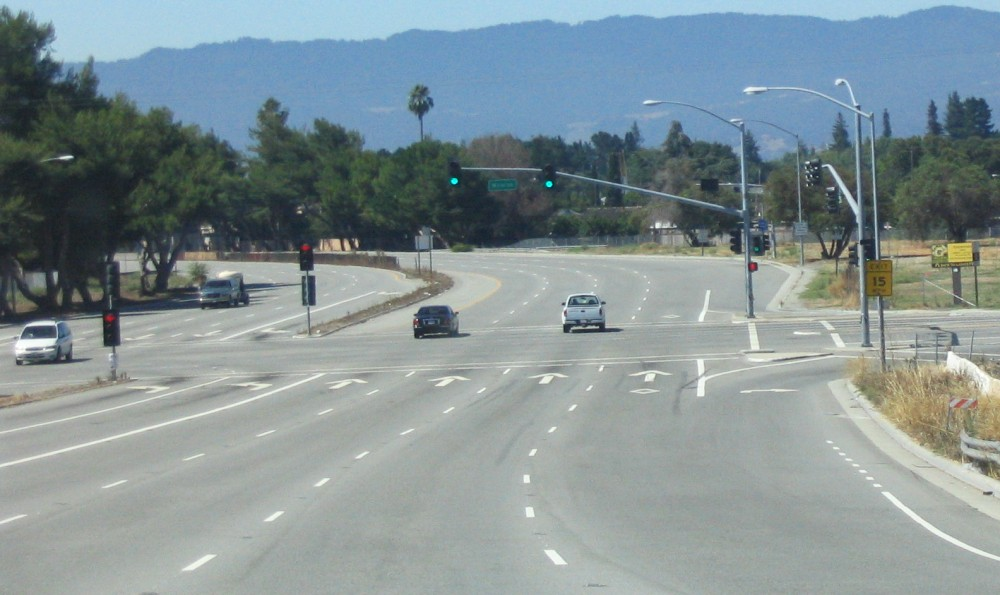
Intersection of San Tomas Expressway and Monroe Street in Santa Clara, California

CR G4 begins in the south at its interchange with SR 17 and Camden Avenue as San Tomas Expressway in the city of Campbell. The road is three lanes wide in each direction, with an HOV carpool lane occupying the right lane, from SR 17 north to Homestead Road, where it expands to four lanes in each direction with an HOV lane until San Tomas "ends" at US 101. The majority of intersections along San Tomas are at grade, controlled by traffic lights. The only grade-separated intersections along San Tomas are at SR 17, US 101, Winchester (necessary due to a Union Pacific branchline), and the junction with Central Expressway (G6). G4 intersects at grade with El Camino Real in Santa Clara. Further north in Santa Clara, G4 crosses US 101 and becomes Montague Expressway.

Montague Expressway is signed as an east–west route, however it is not signed as G4 along its entire length. Montague continues east as an 8 lane road until it crosses Interstate 880 on the San Jose/Milpitas city line, where it loses a lane to become a 6 lane road. G4 reaches its eastern terminus at Interstate 680 but the physical road continues as Landess Ave further east until it ends at its intersection with Piedmont Road.

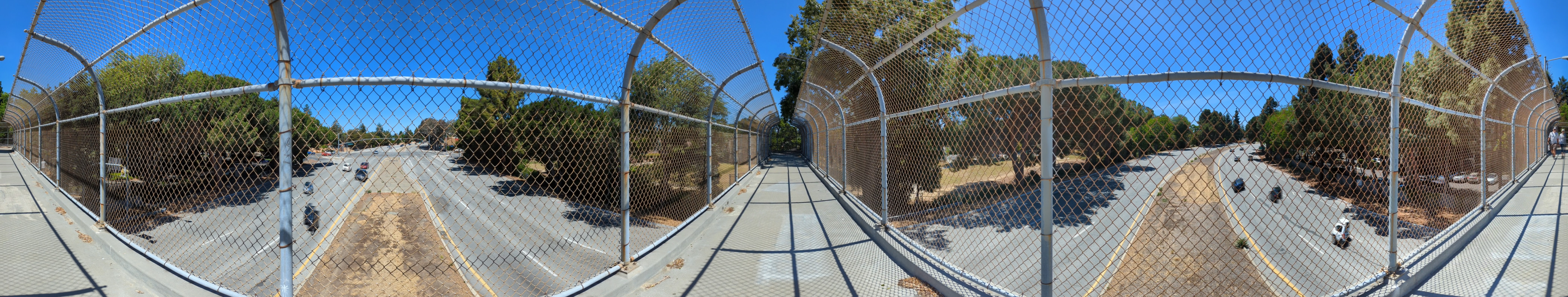
San Tomas Expressway from the pedestrian overpass at Parkway Park near Saratoga Avenue
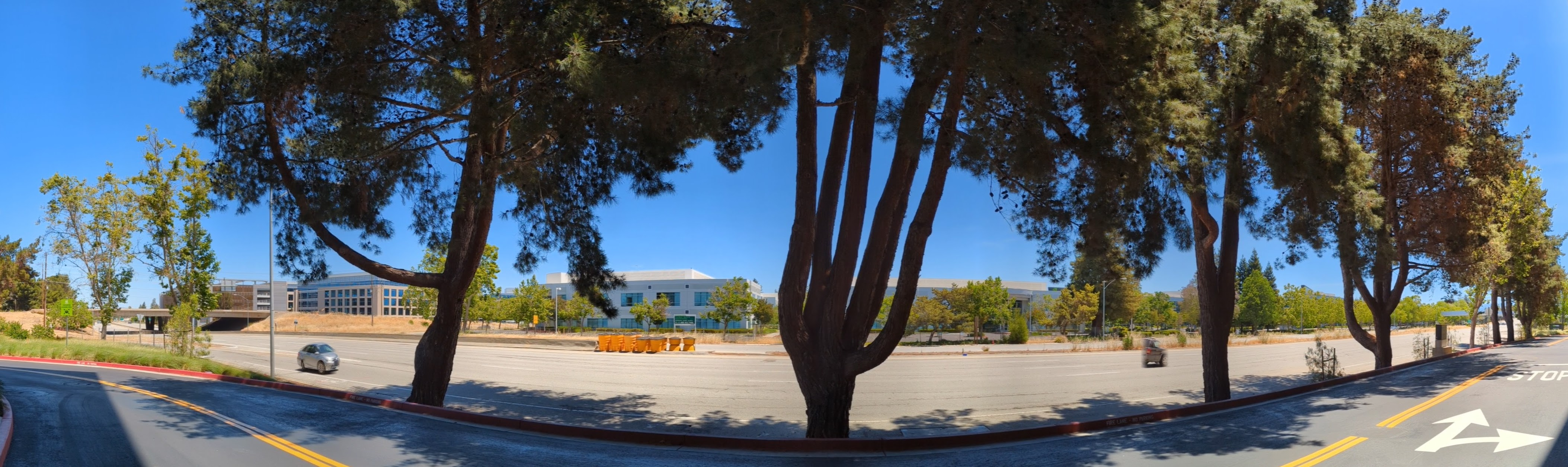
San Tomas Expressway just south of the Central Expressway interchange, which is visible at left
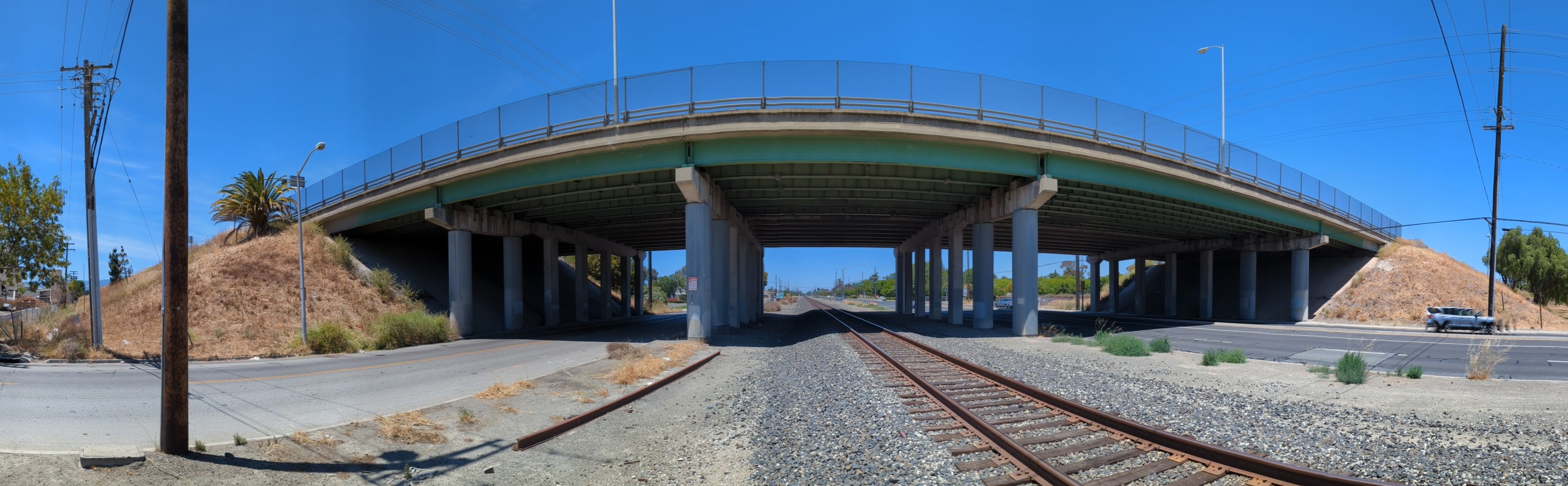
Montague Expressway passing over Lafayette Street (right) and Bassett Street (left) and the railroad that the Capitol Corridor and Altamont Commuter Express run on

=== History ===
G4 was designated and signed in 1962 along the San Tomas portions. Montague was designated later around 1978. Whether this has anything to do with Montague and not being physically signed as G4 is uncertain. Emergency Call boxes along Montague however are labeled as being on G4 leaving no doubt that Montague is part of G4.

Original plans called for G4 to include Hillsdale Avenue and Camden Avenue, between its present-day southern terminus and the southern terminus of Capitol Expressway (G21). These plans were never brought to fruition.

=== Major intersections ===
The entire route is in Santa Clara County.

Location	mi	km	Destinations	Notes
Campbell			SR 17 / Curtner Avenue – Santa Cruz, San Jose, Oakland	Interchange; southern terminus; SR 17 exit 23; road continues as Camden Avenue
Campbell			Dell Avenue / Camden Avenue / Sunnyoaks Avenue	Interchange
Campbell			Winchester Boulevard – Los Gatos Creek Park	Interchange
Santa Clara			SR 82 (El Camino Real)	
Santa Clara			Central Expressway (CR G6)	Interchange
Santa Clara			US 101 (Bayshore Freeway) – San Francisco, San Jose	Interchange; US 101 exit 392; north end of San Tomas Expressway; south end of Montague Expressway
Santa Clara			Lafayette Street	Interchange
San Jose–Milpitas line			I-880 (Nimitz Freeway) – Oakland, San Jose	Interchange; I-880 exit 7
San Jose–Milpitas line			Main Street / Oakland Road	Former SR 238
San Jose–Milpitas line			I-680 (Sinclair Freeway) – Sacramento, San Jose	Interchange; northern terminus; I-680 exit 6; road continues as Landess Avenue
1.000 mi = 1.609 km; 1.000 km = 0.621 mi

== G5 ==
County Road G5
- Foothill Expressway
- Location: Santa Clara County
- Length: 7.24 mi (11.65 km)
- Existed: 1962–present

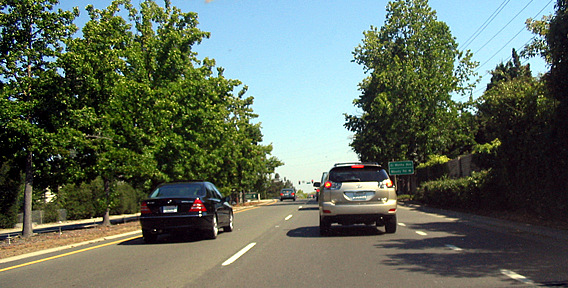
Foothill Expressway, approaching El Monte Road, before the 2021 widening project

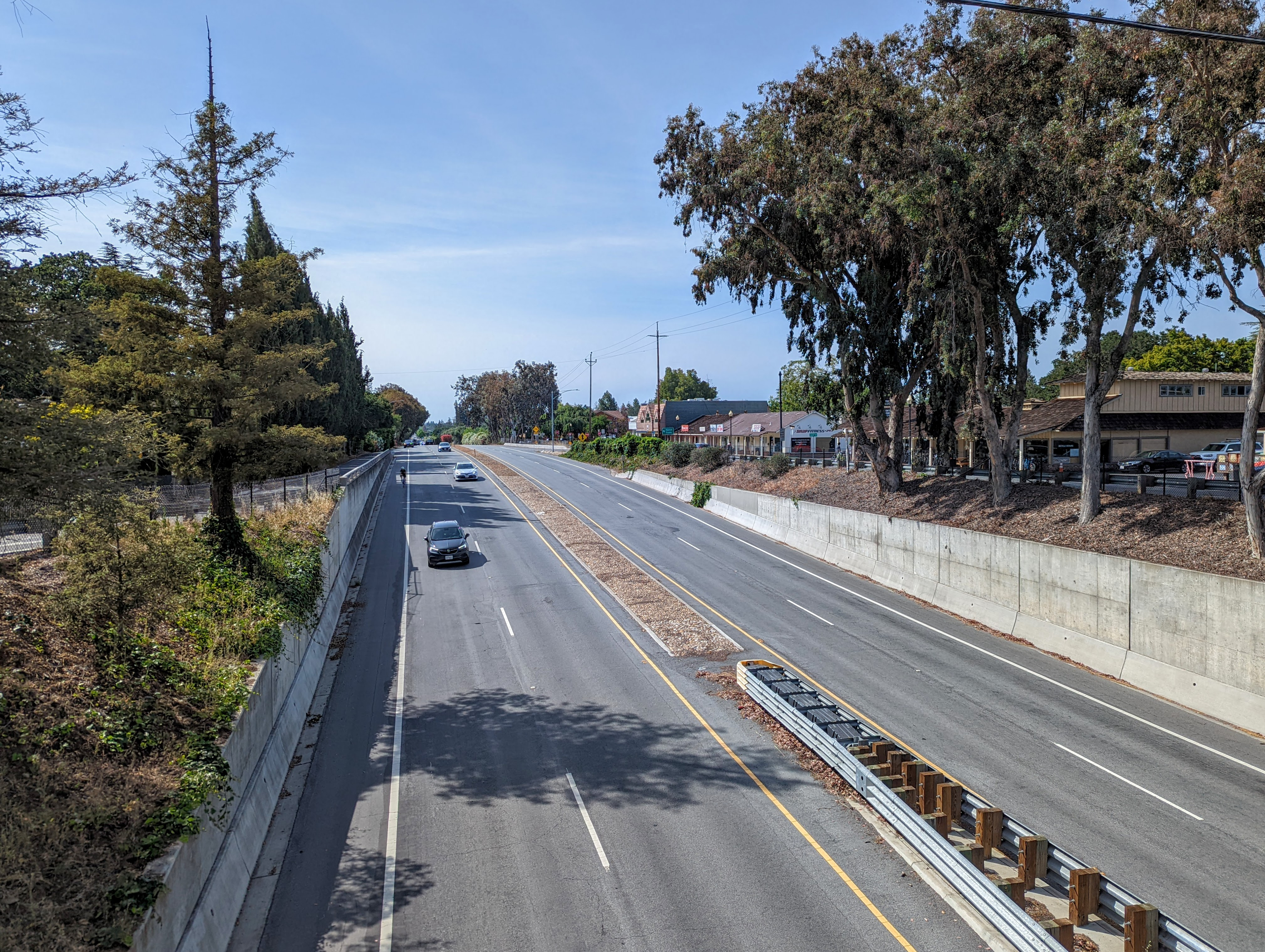
Foothill from the Loyola Corners overpass, looking northwest

Animated alternation between 1965 and 1969 USGS maps showing the addition of Interstate 280 and Foothill Expressway, and the rerouting of Page Mill Road (G3)

County Route G5 (CR G5), more often referred to as Foothill Expressway, is a 4-lane, 7.24-mile (11.65 km) long, northwest–southeast route in Santa Clara County, California, United States. It connects Palo Alto to the Silicon Valley proper closely paralleling Interstate 280 through the lower Santa Cruz Mountains foothills. CR G5 is part of the Santa Clara County expressway system. The speed limit for Foothill Expressway is 45 MPH.

=== Route description ===
CR G5 begins at its southeastern end at I-280 in Cupertino, California. It proceeds northwest directly east of I-280 making it a viable alternative route for short trips between Cupertino and Palo Alto. The road is a four-lane expressway along its entire route. Access is generally limited to major intersections that are governed by traffic lights except for an interchange at Fremont Avenue, which the interchange also provides access to Miramonte Avenue and Loyola Drive. CR G5 travels through several affluent neighborhoods in Los Altos before reaching its northern terminus at the intersection with Page Mill Road (CR G3). The physical road continues north as Junipero Serra Boulevard and passes the back entrances to Stanford University. In the south, the road continues past Foothill Boulevard onto Stevens Canyon Road, a winding mountain road that passes by a rock quarry and several open space preserves.

=== History ===
G5 was designated in 1962 and is currently signed its entire length. The route was built upon the right-of-way for the Los Altos branch of the Peninsular Railway. The buildings along the route at Loyola Corners in Los Altos are historical railroad station buildings.

In 1970, one of the first scientifically designed noise barriers in the nation was conceived for Foothill Expressway in a study overseen by the Santa Clara County Public Works Department using Sunnyvale consultant ESL Inc.

In 2021, Route G5 saw one of its only major expansions from since it was first built; the section of Foothill between San Antonio Road and El Monte Avenue was widened from 4 lanes to 6, complete with removal of the dedicated right-turn ramps and installation of new traffic signals. This section of CR G5 often sees heavy commuter traffic, particularly from motorists accessing I-280 from San Antonio Road via El Monte.

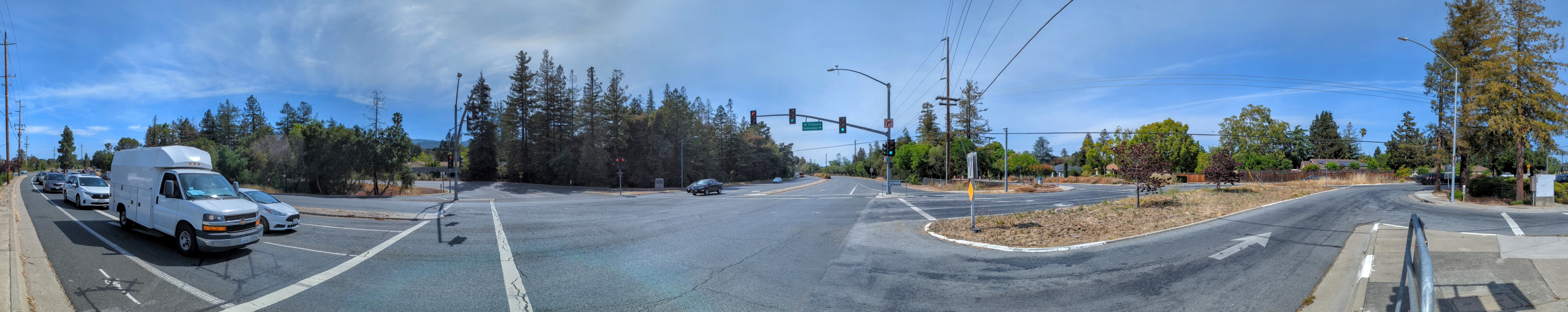
Foothill Expressway (left and center) at Grant Road and Homestead Road (right)

=== Major intersections ===
The entire route is in Santa Clara County.

Location	mi	km	Destinations	Notes
Los Altos	0.0	0.0	I-280 (Junipero Serra Freeway) – San Francisco, San Jose	Interchange; southern terminus; I-280 exit 13; road continues as North Foothill Boulevard
Los Altos	1.7	2.7	Fremont Avenue, Miramonte Avenue, Loyola Drive	Interchange
Los Altos	2.4	3.9	Springer Road, Magdalena Avenue	
Los Altos	3.5	5.6	El Monte Avenue to Moody Road	
Los Altos	3.8	6.1	San Antonio Road	No left turn southbound
Los Altos	4.1	6.6	Main Street – Downtown Los Altos	
Los Altos	5.9	9.5	Arastradero Road	Northbound exit only interchange (Arastradero Road east); at-grade intersection all other directions
Palo Alto	7.2	11.6	Page Mill Road (CR G3) to I-280	Northern terminus; road continues as Junipero Serra Boulevard
1.000 mi = 1.609 km; 1.000 km = 0.621 mi: Incomplete access

== G6 ==
County Road G6
- Location: Santa Clara County
- Length: 12.33 mi (19.84 km)
- Existed: 1962–present

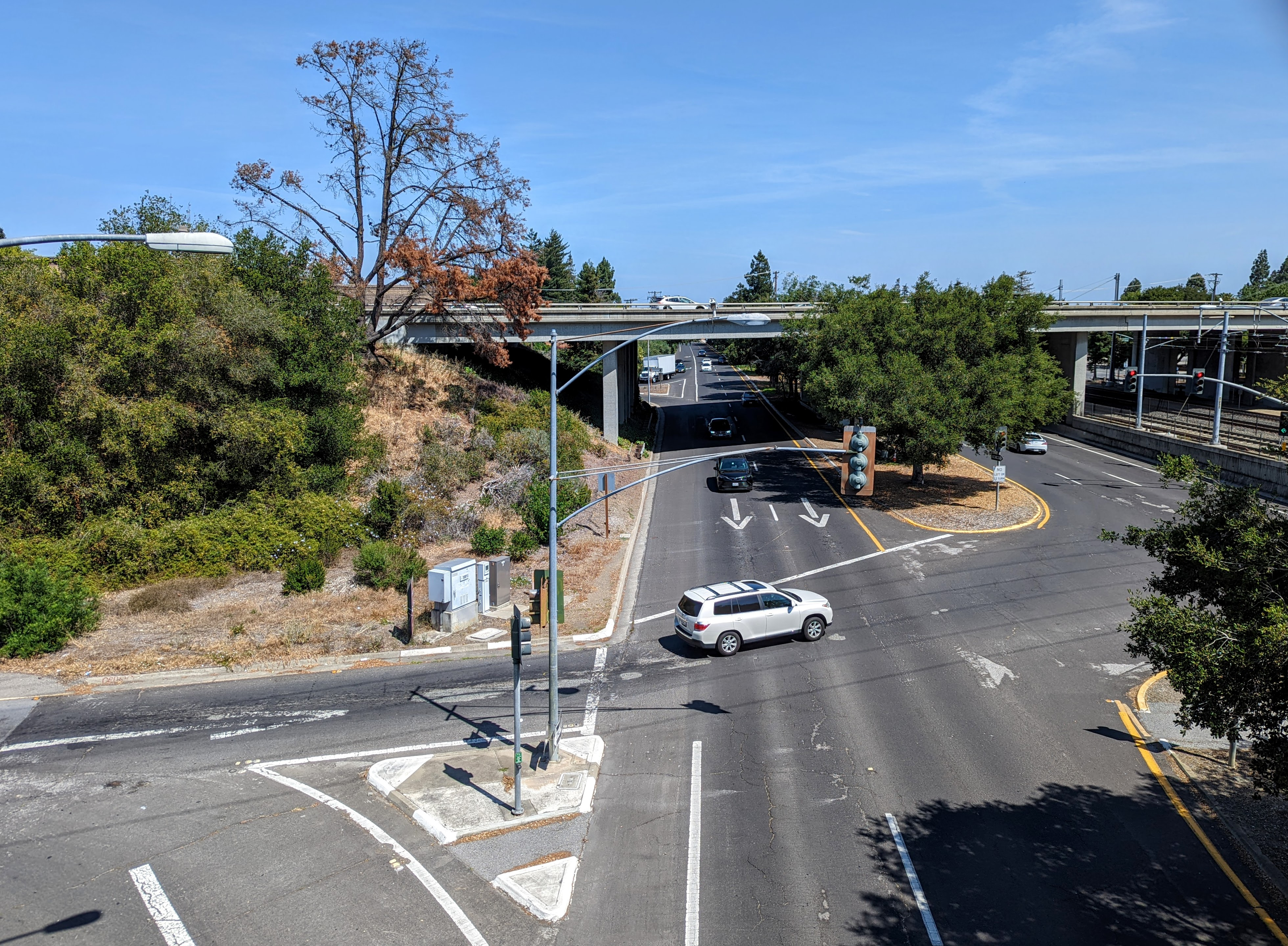
Central going under CA-85, viewed from the Stevens Creek Trail bicycle/pedestrian overpass

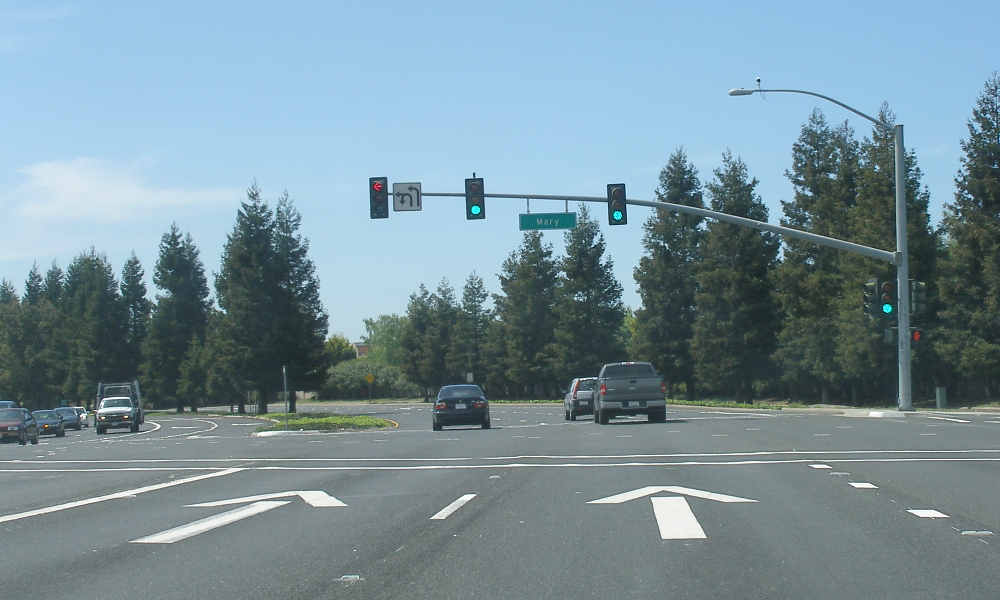
One of Central Expressway's at-grade intersections, at Mary Avenue, Sunnyvale

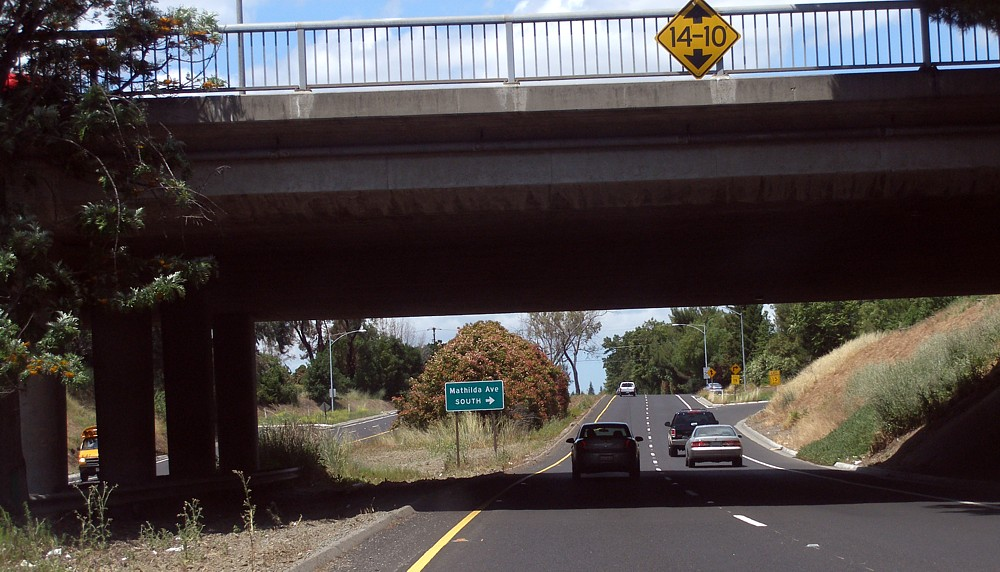
The Mathilda Avenue interchange on the controlled-access portion of Central Expressway

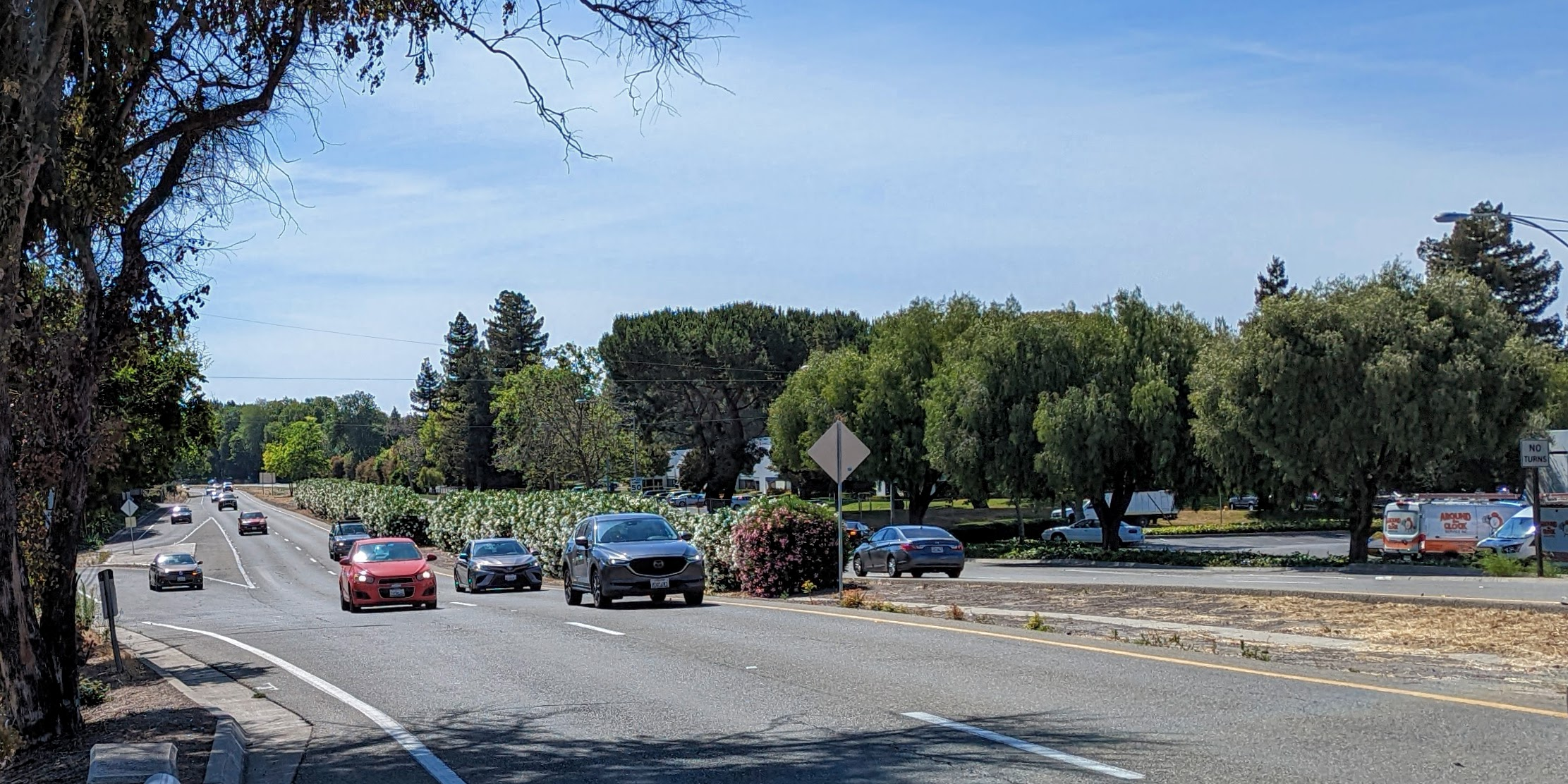
Central approaching Lawrence Expressway, showing typical short entrance ramp

County Route G6 (CR G6) is a signed 12.3-mile (19.8 km) long, east–west route in the western portion of Silicon Valley in Santa Clara County, California, United States. It consists mainly of Central Expressway, along with portions of Alma Street in Palo Alto and De La Cruz Boulevard in San Jose. While paralleling US 101, El Camino Real (SR 82) and I-280, all of which are signed north–south, Central Expressway is signed east–west. This is due to the fact that all of these routes move in an east–west direction in this area, but these other routes continue longer than Central Expressway and are mostly north–south overall. This route is part of the Santa Clara County expressway system.

=== Route description ===
CR G6 begins in the west at Oregon Expressway (CR G3) as Alma Street in Palo Alto. In Palo Alto, CR G6 remains a major surface street with four lanes of traffic and a center turning lane to service the many driveways and turnoffs available. At the Palo Alto – Mountain View border at San Antonio Road, CR G6's character changes, removing the driveways and frequent intersections and adding a center divider, and is known as Central Expressway. Central continues east as a 4-6 lane road through the city of Mountain View. There are signalized intersections at major thoroughfares, and there is a grade crossing for the VTA Light Rail. This section's intersections are primarily at-grade with cross streets controlled by traffic lights, although there are some overpasses, such as for San Antonio Road, Shoreline Boulevard, SR 85, Whisman Road, SR 237, and Middlefield Road.

Up to this point, the roadway has paralleled the Caltrain rail line all the way from the Palo Alto station, which limits the intersections on the south side of the road. The roadway branches off from the railway at Bernardo Avenue.

After crossing under SR 85, Central Expressway takes on a very freeway-like appearance (which is not typical for most county roads) for several miles through Sunnyvale. Through this section, Central Expressway has a wide center divider with guardrails, and access is limited to a sequence of several separated grade interchanges at main cross streets with no turnoffs or driveways. The final in this sequence is at Lawrence Expressway (CR G2). East of CR G2, Central resumes at grade intersections along with sporadic HOV lanes at the approaches to intersections. Central has one final separated grade interchange with San Tomas Expressway (CR G4).

After CR G4, Central Expressway continues east for about a mile as a 6-lane expressway until it abruptly ends at De La Cruz Boulevard, where all lanes must turn left or right. CR G6 continues for a few hundred feet north on De La Cruz until it reaches its terminus at US 101, just outside the north end of the runways for San Jose International Airport. The physical road continues as Trimble Road towards CR G4, while at its western terminus in Palo Alto, Alma Street continues northwest through downtown Palo Alto until Alma ends at El Camino Real near the border of Palo Alto and Menlo Park.

The posted speed limit on CR G6 is 50 MPH (80 km/h). In Mountain View, the posted limit drops to 45 MPH.

=== History ===
Central Expressway was first designated in 1962. Central Expressway was a vital route through the western Silicon Valley in the days before US 101 had been widened and I-280 had been built as an alternate route. Central Expressway still acts as an alternate route to US 101 through the west valley, however usage has declined as both freeways are now much larger and more direct routes.

In 1982, the prohibition against bicyclists using Central Expressway's shoulders was lifted. All pedestrian prohibitions were repealed by 2003.

In 2007, construction was completed near the eastern terminus widening Central Expressway to accommodate an HOV lane and a reconfiguration of the intersection with Lafayette Street.

In 2016, VTA expanded the Central Expressway grade crossing from 1 track to 2 tracks, necessitating some closures between Whisman and Mary for construction. CR G6 was also closed to vehicular traffic in the same stretch on the day of Super Bowl 50 so that Light Rail traffic would have priority to Levi's Stadium.

In 2020, Mountain View closed Castro Street to vehicular traffic to support outdoor dining in the wake of the COVID-19 pandemic. The road is still closed to this day, and the turn pockets onto Castro Street from Central remain coned off while the city and county determine more permanent plans for this intersection.

In early 2023, the eastern terminus of CR G6 was modified to match the new configuration of the De La Cruz Boulevard / US 101 interchange. The right slip ramps to/from De La Cruz on Central were permanently closed to traffic and replaced with standard right turn lanes.

Central Expressway is currently signed as CR G6 sporadically along its entire length.

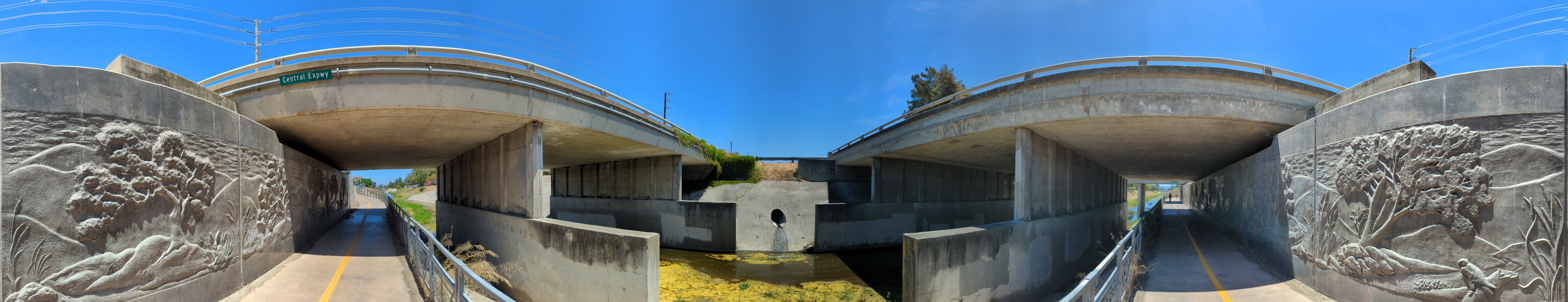
Central Expressway's divided bridge over San Tomas Aquino Creek, from the San Tomas Aquino Creek Trail just west of the San Tomas Expressway interchange

=== Major intersections ===
The entire route is in Santa Clara County.

Location	mi	km	Destinations	Notes
Palo Alto	0.0	0.0	Oregon Expressway / Page Mill Road (CR G3) to SR 82 (El Camino Real) / US 101 – Business District	Interchange; western terminus; road continues as Alma Street
Palo Alto	2.2	3.5	San Antonio Road to US 101 (Bayshore Freeway) – Los Altos	Interchange; east end of Alma Street; west end of Central Expressway
Mountain View	3.9	6.3	Shoreline Boulevard – Downtown Mountain View	Interchange
Mountain View	4.7	7.6	SR 85 north / Easy Street	Interchange; SR 85 south exit 23; no eastbound exit
Mountain View	5.0	8.0	Whisman Road	Interchange via connector road
Sunnyvale	6.0	9.7	Middlefield Road	Interchange; no eastbound exit
Sunnyvale	6.8	10.9	Mathilda Avenue	Interchange via connector roads; former SR 85
Sunnyvale	7.6	12.2	Fair Oaks Avenue, Arques Avenue	Interchange
Sunnyvale	8.0	12.9	Wolfe Road	Interchange
Sunnyvale	8.9	14.3	Lawrence Expressway (CR G2)	Interchange via connector roads
Santa Clara	10.7	17.2	San Tomas Expressway (CR G4)	Interchange via connector roads
Santa Clara	11.9	19.2	De La Cruz Boulevard – San Jose, Santa Clara, SJ International Airport, Avaya Stadium	East end of Central Expressway; west end of De La Cruz Boulevard on CR G6
San Jose	12.3	19.8	US 101 (Bayshore Freeway) – San Francisco, San Jose, SJ International Airport	Interchange; eastern terminus; US 101 exit 391; former US 101 Byp.; road continues as Trimble Road
1.000 mi = 1.609 km; 1.000 km = 0.621 mi: Incomplete access

== G7 ==
County Road G7
- Bloomfield Avenue
- Location: Santa Clara County
- Length: 3.25 mi (5.23 km)
- Existed: 1962–present

County Route G7 (CR G7) is a road in Santa Clara County, California, United States, southeast of Gilroy. The road is known as Bloomfield Avenue for its entire length, which runs from State Route 25 near US 101 to State Route 152.

The route serves as a bypass for travelers who are traveling from westbound State Route 152 to southbound U.S. Route 101. County Route G7 bypasses SR 152 at the US 101 interchange, where SR 152 is signed as 10th Street. This bypass avoids considerable amounts of traffic congestion that is the result of large retail shopping centers on both sides of 10th Street.

CR G7 also serves Frazier Lake Airpark via Frazer Lake Road, as well as the Christopher Ranch garlic facility.

=== Major intersections ===
The entire route is in Santa Clara County.

Location	mi	km	Destinations	Notes
	0.0	0.0	SR 25 – Salinas, Hollister	Western terminus
	0.4	0.64	Bolsa Road	
	2.0	3.2	Frazer Lake Road	
	3.2	5.1	SR 152 (Pacheco Pass Highway) – Los Banos, Gilroy	Eastern terminus
1.000 mi = 1.609 km; 1.000 km = 0.621 mi

== G8 ==
County Road G8
- Location: Santa Clara County
- Length: 29.38 mi (47.28 km)
- Existed: 1962–present

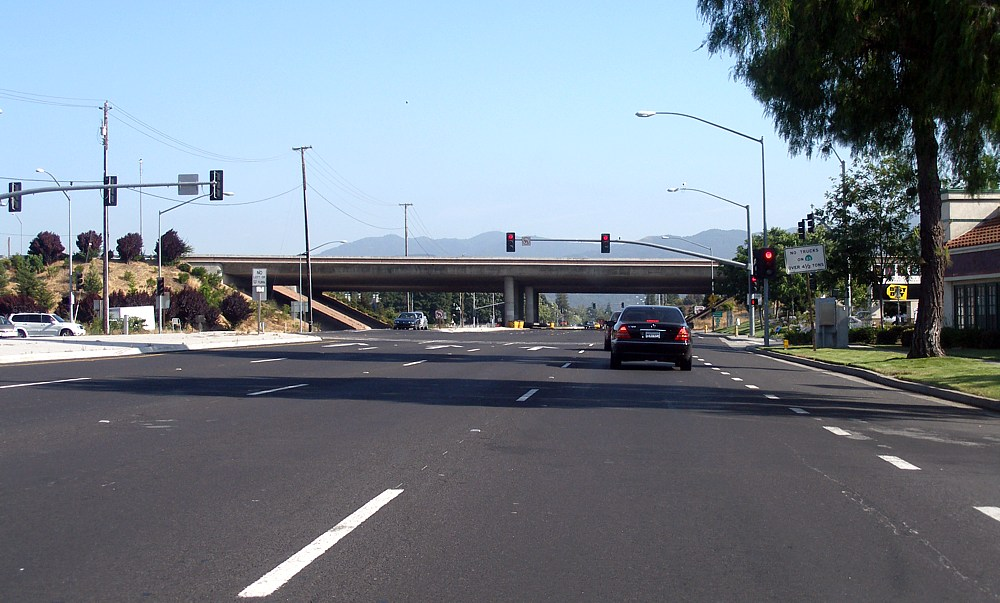
Almaden Expressway at its interchange with Route 85

County Route G8 (CR G8) is an important north–south arterial road from the South Valley area of Santa Clara County, California, United States, to near Downtown San Jose. It runs for 29.4 miles (47.3 km) over both rural roads, expressway and urban streets, but it is most commonly known by residents for its expressway portion, Almaden Expressway. The route is also known as Watsonville Road, Uvas Road, McKean Road, and small portions of Harry Road, Almaden Road, and Alma Avenue. CR G8 is also part of the Santa Clara County expressway system.

=== Route description ===
CR G8 begins in the south at its junction with State Route 152 in Gilroy. It proceeds north along Watsonville Road as a two-lane country road until it reaches the intersection of Watsonville Road and Uvas Road. CR G8 turns left and proceeds north along Uvas Road which is a winding two-lane mountain road that passes by Uvas, Chesbro and Calero reservoirs and their surrounding parks. In Calero Reservoir County Park, Uvas Road transitions to McKean Road and proceeds into the Almaden Valley area of San Jose. At the north end of McKean Road, CR G8 turns briefly right on Harry Road for a short distance and then left on to the south end of Almaden Expressway.

As Almaden Expressway, CR G8 begins as a 2-lane undivided road for 1/2 mile before expanding to 4-lane divided expressway approaching the intersection of Almaden Road. Almaden Expressway eventually expands to a 6-8 lane expressway with the majority of access limited to major intersections controlled by traffic signals. The major exception to this is near State Route 85 and Blossom Hill Road (CR G10) where there are several major shopping centers.

CR G8 intersects CR G10 at Blossom Hill Road and SR 85 a quarter mile north. This interchange is one of the busiest in Silicon Valley due to several shopping centers and a Costco warehouse store all sharing driveways with this interchange. CR G8 continues north resuming its expressway design. It shares a separated grade interchange with the terminus of Capitol Expressway Auto Mall and again with Curtner Avenue. Other intersections along this part of the route are at grade. Almaden Expressway crosses State Route 87 with which it shares a northbound only interchange.

CR G8 continues past the north end of Almaden Expressway on to Almaden Road as a 4-lane city street. At the intersection Almaden Road and Alma Avenue, CR G8 turns east along Alma Avenue and proceeds for about a quarter mile to its eastern terminus at First Street (former SR 82).

=== History ===
CR G8 was originally designated in 1962 along Almaden Expressway which had begun construction in 1959. Almaden Expressway was not completed to its southern terminus until 1984. Before that time the section between McKean Road and the southern end of the expressway (which was further north at the time) took a zig zag path from McKean Road to Harry Road to Almaden Road (S) to Barnes Lane, to the then southern end of Almaden Expressway.

CR G8 is signed sporadically along its entire length.

=== Major intersections ===
The entire route is in Santa Clara County.

Location	mi	km	Destinations	Notes
Llagas-Uvas	0.0	0.0	SR 152 – Watsonville, Gilroy	Southern terminus
Llagas-Uvas	3.6	5.8	Watsonville Road – Morgan Hill	North end of Watsonville Road on CR G8; south end of Uvas Road
Llagas-Uvas	9.5	15.3	Croy Road – Sveadal	
Llagas-Uvas	13.3	21.4	Casa Loma Road – Mountain Home	North end of Uvas Road; south end of McKean Road
San Jose	19.8	31.9	McKean Road, McKean Court	North end of McKean Road on CR G8; south end of Harry Road
San Jose	19.9	32.0	Harry Road east	North end of Harry Road on CR G8; south end of Almaden Expressway
San Jose	24.6	39.6	Blossom Hill Road (CR G10)	
San Jose	24.9	40.1	SR 85 (West Valley Freeway)	Interchange; SR 85 exit 6; trucks over 4.5 short tons (4.1 t) prohibited
San Jose	26.3	42.3	Capitol Expressway Auto Mall (CR G21) / Hillsdale Avenue	Interchange
San Jose	26.9	43.3	Lincoln Avenue – Willow Glen	Interchange; northbound exit and southbound entrance
San Jose	27.6	44.4	Curtner Avenue to SR 87 south	Interchange
San Jose	28.3	45.5	SR 87 north (Guadalupe Freeway)	Interchange; SR 87 south exit 3B; no northbound entrance; no right turn southbound
San Jose	28.8	46.3	Almaden Road south	North end of Almaden Expressway; south end of Almaden Road on CR G8; no left turn northbound
San Jose	29.1	46.8	Almaden Avenue, Alma Avenue west	North end of Almaden Road; south end of Alma Avenue on CR G8
San Jose	29.4	47.3	First Street / Monterey Road	Northern terminus; former SR 82
San Jose	29.4	47.3	Alma Avenue east	Continuation beyond First Street / Monterey Road; serves Sharks Ice, CEFCU Stadium, Excite Ballpark
1.000 mi = 1.609 km; 1.000 km = 0.621 mi: Incomplete access

== G9 ==
County Road G9
- Location: Santa Clara County
- Length: 4.17 mi (6.71 km)
- Existed: 1963–present

County Route G9 (CR G9) is a road in Santa Clara County, California, United States. The route runs along Leavesley Road from State Route 152's northern interchange with US 101 in Gilroy and then curves southward onto Ferguson Road. The route's eastern terminus is at SR 152 (Pacheco Pass Highway) east of Gilroy.

County Route G9 serves shoppers traveling to the Gilroy Premium Outlets, which features more than 145 stores and is the largest collection of outlet stores in Northern California.

County Route G9 serves several agricultural facilities along its route. It also serves travelers as a bypass around the city of Gilroy, who wish to avoid the congestion at 10th Street and U.S. Route 101.

=== Major intersections ===
The entire route is in Santa Clara County.

Location	mi	km	Destinations	Notes
Gilroy			SR 152 west (Leavesley Road)	Continuation beyond US 101
Gilroy			US 101 / SR 152 east (South Valley Freeway) – Los Angeles, San Jose	Interchange; western terminus; US 101 exit 357
			New Avenue	
			Leavesley Road east	East end of Leavesley Road on CR G9; west end of Ferguson Road
			SR 152 (Pacheco Pass Highway)	Eastern terminus
1.000 mi = 1.609 km; 1.000 km = 0.621 mi

== G10 ==
County Road G10
- Location: Santa Clara County
- Length: 10.34 mi (16.64 km)
- Existed: 1964–present

County Route G10 (CR G10), known as Los Gatos-Saratoga Road, Los Gatos Boulevard, and more commonly known along the majority of its route as Blossom Hill Road for the majority of its length, is an important east–west arterial roadway through the Almaden Valley area of Santa Clara County, California, United States in the Silicon Valley. The route runs for 10.34 miles (16.64 km) and is a series of city streets for its entire length.

=== Route description ===
County Route G10 begins at its western end at the junction of SR 17 and Los Gatos-Saratoga Road (formerly Saratoga Avenue) in Los Gatos. It travels east on Los Gatos-Saratoga Road to the end of that road then turns northeast along Los Gatos Boulevard. CR G10 proceeds for about 3/4 mile (1.2 km) to Blossom Hill Road where it turns east. Along this stretch, CR G10 is a narrow road that proceeds over Blossom Hill, the hill that the road takes its name from. At the base of Blossom Hill, CR G10 enters San Jose and the Almaden Valley neighborhood.

CR G10 proceeds as a busy 4-6 lane artery through this area, intersecting Almaden Expressway and further east, through the Blossom Valley neighborhood of San Jose, to SR 85. Prior to the completion of the segments of SR 85 between 1991 and 1994, which CR G10 roughly parallels, Blossom Hill Road was the major accessway to this area of San Jose from the west.

CR G10 reaches its eastern terminus at former prior-to-2013 SR 82, a few hundred feet (~100 meters) shy of US 101. Blossom Hill Road continues to US 101 and then over the freeway becoming Silver Creek Valley Road, before continuing as Nieman Boulevard and terminating at the junction with Capitol Expressway.

=== History ===
G10 was designated in 1964 as a county road. As of 2005, however, the road is no longer maintained by the county and is city street along its entire length. G10 is also only sporadically signed along its route and has been largely abandoned by the county after the completion of SR 85.

=== Major intersections ===
The entire route is in Santa Clara County.

Location	mi	km	Destinations	Notes
Los Gatos			SR 9 south (Los Gatos-Saratoga Road)	Continuation beyond SR 17
Los Gatos			SR 17 – Santa Cruz, San Jose	Interchange; western terminus; SR 17 exits 20A-B
Los Gatos			Los Gatos Boulevard south	East end of Los Gatos-Saratoga Road; west end of Los Gatos Boulevard on CR G10
Los Gatos			Kennedy Road	
Los Gatos			Shannon Road	
Los Gatos			Los Gatos Boulevard north, Blossom Hill Road west	East end of Los Gatos Boulevard on CR G10; west end of Blossom Hill Road on CR G10
Los Gatos			Union Avenue	
Los Gatos–San Jose line			Leigh Avenue	
San Jose			Camden Avenue	
San Jose			Meridian Avenue	
San Jose			Kooser Road	No left turn eastbound
San Jose			Almaden Expressway (CR G8)	
San Jose			Santa Teresa Boulevard	Connects to SR 87
San Jose			Blossom Avenue	
San Jose			SR 85 (West Valley Freeway) – Gilroy, Mountain View	Interchange; SR 85 exit 4; trucks over 4.5 short tons (4.1 t) prohibited
San Jose			Snell Avenue	
San Jose			Poughkeepsie Road	
San Jose			Cottle Road	Interchange
San Jose			SR 82 north (Monterey Road)	Interchange; eastern terminus; SR 82 is signed, but is not state maintained
San Jose			SR 82 south (Blossom Hill Road) to US 101 (Bayshore Freeway, South Valley Freeway) / Silver Creek Valley Road – Los Angeles, San Francisco	Continuation beyond Monterey Road; SR 82 is signed, but is not state maintained
1.000 mi = 1.609 km; 1.000 km = 0.621 mi: Incomplete access

== G11 ==
County Road G11
- San Juan Road
- Location: Monterey County
- Length: 8.96 mi (14.42 km)
- Existed: 1965–present

County Route G11 (CR G11) is a county road in unincorporated Monterey County, California, United States. The route runs from Porter Drive (County Route G12) in Pajaro along San Juan Road through the Pajaro Valley and terminates at US 101 south of Aromas.

=== Route description ===
County Route G11 begins as San Juan Road at the intersection of Porter Drive (County Route G12) in Pajaro. It leaves Pajaro and continues east for a 3/4 mile before gradually turning southeast towards Aromas. The road enters a brief, but steep hill for a 3/4 mile with a passing lane, then returns as a two-lane road turning south and then southeast. Nearing the eastern terminus at US 101, CR G11 curves to the east and then sharply turns southeast. CR G11 crosses into San Benito County approximately one hundred feet (30 meters) before reaching its terminus at US 101.

It provides an alternative route from Gilroy and Hollister towards Santa Cruz, bypassing the twistier, hillier routes 152 and 129, which, like Highway 17, can be daunting to novice drivers.

=== Major intersections ===
County	Location	mi	km	Destinations	Notes
Monterey	Pajaro			Porter Drive (CR G12) – Castroville, Watsonville	Western terminus; road continues as San Juan Road
Monterey				Carpenteria Road – Aromas	
San Benito				US 101 / SR 156	Interchange; eastern terminus; US 101 exit 342; road continues as Frontage Road
1.000 mi = 1.609 km; 1.000 km = 0.621 mi

== G12 ==
County Road G12
- Location: Monterey and Santa Cruz counties
- Length: 10.54 mi (16.96 km)
- Existed: 1965–present

County Route G12 (CR G12) is a county road in Monterey and Santa Cruz counties in the U.S. state of California. The route, running almost 11 miles (18 km), begins at US 101 near Prunedale and follows San Miguel Canyon Road 4 miles (6 km) north-northwestward to Hall Road, onto which the route turns westward for 3 miles (5 km) passing through the community of Las Lomas. This portion arrives at Elkhorn Road, where G12 turns northward for 1 mile (2 km) before joining Salinas Road first to enter Pajaro, where the route becomes Porter Drive, and then crosses into Santa Cruz County to enter Watsonville, where the route joins Main Street and terminates at State Route 129.

=== Major intersections ===
County	Location	mi	km	Destinations	Notes
Monterey	Prunedale			US 101 (SR 156)	Interchange; southern terminus; US 101 exit 337
Monterey	Prunedale			San Miguel Canyon Road to US 101 – Aromas	North end of San Miguel Canyon Road on CR G12; south end of Hall Road
Monterey				Elkhorn Road – Elkhorn Slough Reserve	North end of Hall Road; south end of Elkhorn Road on CR G12
Monterey				Salinas Road south to SR 1	North end of Elkhorn Road; south end of Salinas Road on CR G12; access from CR G12 north to Salinas Road south and from Salinas Road north to CR G12 south is via Werner Road
Monterey	Pajaro			Salinas Road north	North end of Salinas Road on CR G12; south end of Porter Drive; connects to CR G11
Monterey	Pajaro			CR G11 (San Juan Road) to US 101 – Aromas	Western terminus of CR G11
Monterey–Santa Cruz county line				Pajaro River Bridge over the Pajaro River; North end of Porter Drive; south end of Main Street	
Santa Cruz	Watsonville			SR 129 (Riverside Drive)	Northern terminus
Santa Cruz	Watsonville			Main Street	Continuation beyond SR 129; connects to SR 152
1.000 mi = 1.609 km; 1.000 km = 0.621 mi

== G13 ==
County Road G13
- Location: Monterey and San Benito counties
- Length: 15.68 mi (25.23 km)

County Route G13 (CR G13) is a county road in Monterey and San Benito counties in the U.S. state of California. The route runs almost 16 miles (26 km) between King City in Monterey County and State Route 25 in San Benito County. It is known as Broadway Circle, Broadway Street, a portion of First Street, Lyons Street, and Bitterwater Road.

=== Route description ===
CR G13 begins in King City at the interchange with U.S. Route 101 in King City as a city street. It turns east through downtown King City for 1 mile (2 km) before turning northwest on First Street, which then becomes Lyons Street and turning northeast to become Bitterwater Road, passing Mesa Del Rey Airport and leaving the city limits. G13 then enters a hilly area before crossing into San Benito County for an additional 6 miles (10 km) and terminating at the junction of State Route 25 at Bitterwater.

=== Major intersections ===
County	Location	mi	km	Destinations	Notes
Monterey	King City			US 101	Interchange; western terminus; US 101 exit 282B; road continues as River Drive
Monterey	King City			Broadway Street west, San Antonio Drive	East end of Broadway Circle; west end of Broadway Street on CR G13
Monterey	King City			North First Street (CR G15 south)	East end of Broadway Street; west end of North First Street on CR G13; west end of CR G15 overlap
Monterey	King City			Ellis Street	East end of North First Street; west end of Lyons Street
Monterey	King City			Metz Road (CR G15 north)	East end of Lyons Street; west end of Bitterwater Road; east end of CR G15 overlap
San Benito	Bitterwater			SR 25 – Coalinga, Pinnacles, Hollister	Eastern terminus
1.000 mi = 1.609 km; 1.000 km = 0.621 mi: Concurrency terminus

== G14 ==
County Road G14
- 24th Street, Nacimiento Lake Drive, Interlake Road and Jolon Road.
- Location: Monterey and San Luis Obispo counties
- Length: 62 mi (100 km)
- Tourist routes: Nacimiento Lake Drive and Interlake Road

County Route G14 (CR G14) is a county road in San Luis Obispo and Monterey counties in the U.S. state of California. The route is approximately 62 miles (100 km) long and runs from U.S. Route 101 and State Route 46 near the California Mid-State Fair fairgrounds in Paso Robles to US 101 near King City. CR G14 connects with Lake Nacimiento, Fort Hunter Liggett, and the Mission San Antonio de Padua, as well as the town of Jolon. The route is known as 24th Street in Paso Robles, Nacimiento Lake Drive, Interlake Road, and Jolon Road.

=== Route description ===
CR G14 begins at the intersection of US 101 and State Route 46 in Paso Robles. It then heads west for less than one mile (~1.5 km) before leaving the city limits as Nacimiento Lake Drive and turning mainly northwest for 15 miles (24 km). G14 goes through the community of Lake Nacimiento, then crosses the Nacimiento Dam for 1/4 mile before reaching a steep hill with a brief winding curve. G14 then turns west onto Interlake Road while Nacimiento Lake Drive continues as CR G19. As Interlake Road, G14 heads west with a brief curve to the north for a few miles, passing Bee Rock and Lake San Antonio before turning mainly northwest and eventually north towards the town of Lockwood. Just a few hundred feet (~100 meters) south of Lockwood, G14 reaches the intersection of the western terminus of CR G18 and heads west along Jolon Road. As G14 reaches the small town of Jolon, a side road provides an entrance to the Fort Hunter Liggett military facility while G14 curves to the north. G14 continues north through the southern end of the Santa Lucia range for several miles to reach the southern Salinas Valley. G14 terminates at US 101 west of King City.

County Route G14 is a California State Scenic Highway.

=== Major intersections ===
County	Location	mi	km	Destinations	Notes
San Luis Obispo	Paso Robles			SR 46 east – Fresno, Bakersfield	Continuation beyond US 101
San Luis Obispo	Paso Robles			US 101 / SR 46 west	Interchange; southern terminus; US 101 north exit 231, south exit 231B
San Luis Obispo	Paso Robles			Spring Street	Former US 101; Juan Bautista de Anza National Historic Trail
San Luis Obispo				Mustang Springs Road	North end of 24th Street; south end of Nacimiento Lake Drive
San Luis Obispo				Chimney Rock Road	
San Luis Obispo				CR G19 (Nacimiento Lake Drive) to US 101 north	Southern terminus of CR G19; north end of Nacimiento Lake Drive on CR G14; south end of Interlake Road
Monterey	Lockwood			CR G18 (Jolon Road) / Lockwood Jolon Road – San Antonio Lake North Shore, Bradley, San Lucas	Western terminus of CR G18; north end of Interlake Road; south end of Jolon Road on CR G14
Monterey	Jolon			Mission Road – Fort Hunter Liggett, Mission San Antonio	
Monterey				San Lucas Road – San Lucas	
Monterey				Pine Canyon Road - Pine Canyon	
Monterey				US 101	Interchange; northern terminus; US 101 exit 283
1.000 mi = 1.609 km; 1.000 km = 0.621 mi

== G15 ==
County Road G15
- Location: Monterey County

County Route G15 (CR G15) is a county road in Monterey County, California, United States, running almost 19 miles (31 km) along the eastern edge of the Salinas Valley. The road parallels US 101 (and therefore El Camino Real) between King City and Soledad, with 101 to the west of the Salinas River and G15 to the east and following the western foot of the Gabilan Range.

=== Route description ===
The route begins at US 101 southeast of King City and follows First Street through the city, where it intersects County Route G13 and exits the city as Metz Road. G15 follows this road 17 miles (27 km) northwestward, bypassing Greenfield for the unincorporated community of Metz and terminating at State Route 146 near Soledad.

=== Major intersections ===
The entire route is in Monterey County.

Location	mi	km	Destinations	Notes
King City			US 101	Interchange; southern terminus; US 101 exit 281; road continues as Mesa Verde Road
King City			Broadway Street (CR G13 west)	South end of CR G13 overlap
King City			Ellis Street	North end of First Street; south end of Lyons Street
King City			CR G13 east (Bitterwater Road)	North end of CR G13 overlap and Lyons Street; south end of Metz Road
			CR G16 (Elm Avenue)	Eastern terminus of CR G16
			SR 146 (Metz Road) – Pinnacles National Park, Soledad	Northern terminus
1.000 mi = 1.609 km; 1.000 km = 0.621 mi: Concurrency terminus

== G16 ==
County Road G16
- Location: Monterey County

County Route G16 (CR G16) is a county road in Monterey County, California, United States, that runs 56 miles (90 km) between the Santa Lucia Range and the Sierra de Salinas. The route, beginning from State Route 1, follows Carmel Valley Road along the Carmel River into the Carmel Valley and southeastward into the community of the same name, near which the road intersects with Laureles Grade (CR G20). After 41 miles (66 km) the route turns eastward onto Arroyo Seco Road near Millers Ranch. At the junction with CR G17, where Arroyo Seco Road continues, G16 joins Elm Avenue and enters the Salinas Valley, later passing through Greenfield, crossing the Salinas River, and terminating at Metz Road (CR G15) near the valley's eastern edge.

=== Major intersections ===
The entire route is in Monterey County.

Location	mi	km	Destinations	Notes
			SR 1 north	Western terminus; no left turn to SR 1 south
			Carmel Knolls Drive, Carmel Rancho Boulevard to SR 1 south – Big Sur	
			CR G20 (Laureles Grade) – Monterey, Salinas	Southern terminus of CR G20
			Cachagua Road – Los Padres Dam	Connects to Cachagua
			Tassajara Road – Los Padres Dam, Chews Ridge Lookout	Connects to Cachagua Road, Jamesburg and Tassajara Hot Springs
			Arroyo Seco Road south	East end of Carmel Valley Road; west end of Arroyo Seco Road on CR G16
			CR G17 (Arroyo Seco Road north) – Soledad	Southern terminus of CR G17; east end of Arroyo Seco Road on CR G16; west end of Elm Avenue
Greenfield			El Camino Real, South El Camino Real	Former US 101; connects to US 101 as there is no direct interchange with CR G16
			CR G15 (Metz Road)	Eastern terminus
1.000 mi = 1.609 km; 1.000 km = 0.621 mi: Incomplete access

== G17 ==
County Road G17
- Arroyo Seco Road, Fort Romie Road, River Road, Reservation Road
- Location: Monterey County
- Length: 44.9 mi (72.3 km)
- Tourist routes: River Road Wine Trail

County Route G17 (CR G17) is a county road in Monterey County, California, United States. The route was constructed in 1955, and is part of the De Anza National Historic trail. It wasn't one of the original Signed County Routes but was added in 1965. CR G17 runs from Elm Avenue (CR G16) west of Greenfield to State Route 1 in Marina. The route is known as Arroyo Seco Road, Fort Romie Road, River Road, Reservation Road and the River Road Wine Trail.

=== Route description ===
County Route G17 begins as a three-way intersection with CR G16 near Millers Ranch as Arroyo Seco Road. It then briefly heads northeast before turning north for several miles closely paralleling the eastern end of the Arroyo Seco until at the intersection at Fort Romie Road south of Fort Romie. G17 then proceeds northwest on Fort Romie Road as Arroyo Seco Road continues east to its terminus at US 101. Just after passing the Mission Soledad historic site, G17 turns southwest for 1000 feet before reverting northwest. G17 continues for another 2 miles until the intersection with Foothill Road, becoming River Road. As River Road, G17 continues northwest for several more miles along the Salinas River until the intersection with Gonzales River Road near Gonzales, which G17 turns southwest for 1/4 mile before reverting northwest. As the road nears Chualar, G17 has another intersection with Chualar River Road and heads northwest, closely following the Salinas River. Shortly before the interchange with State Route 68, G17 becomes a 4-lane undivided road for about 1/2 mile before reverting to a 2-lane road and becoming Reservation Road.

As Reservation Road, G17 continues northwest along the Salinas River with occasional sharp curves until reaching a brief steep hill south of Marina and becoming a 4-lane divided road. G17 remains a 4-lane divided road for most of the length through Marina except between Del Monte Boulevard and Beach Road. At Del Monte Boulevard, G17 truncates back to a 2-lane city street, progressively turning north, with traffic circles until the intersection of Beach Road. G17 which then turns northwest for 600 feet, resuming a 4-lane road until the northern terminus at State Route 1.

=== Major intersections ===
The entire route is in Monterey County.

Location	mi	km	Destinations	Notes
			CR G16 (Elm Avenue, Arroyo Seco Road south)	Southern terminus
			Arroyo Seco Road north – Soledad, Greenfield	North end of Arroyo Seco Road on CR G17; south end of Fort Romie Road
			Foothill Road	North end of Fort Romie Road; south end of River Road
			Gonzales River Road – Gonzales	
			Chualar River Road – Chualar	
			SR 68 – Salinas, Monterey	Interchange; north end of River Road; south end of Reservation Road; SR 68 exit 20
			Davis Road – Salinas	
East Garrison			Inter-Garrison Road	
Marina			Imjin Road, Imjin Parkway – Marina Municipal Airport	Serves California State University, Monterey Bay
Marina			California Avenue	
Marina			Del Monte Boulevard	Former SR 1
Marina			Beach Road	
Marina			SR 1	Interchange; northern terminus; SR 1 exit 410; road continues as Reservation Road to Marina State Beach
1.000 mi = 1.609 km; 1.000 km = 0.621 mi

== G18 ==
County Road G18
- Jolon Road
- Location: Monterey County

County Route G18 (CR G18), known entirely as Jolon Road, is a county road in Monterey County, California, United States. Jolon Road itself runs between U.S. Route 101 on both ends. Although Jolon Road runs on both ends of 101, the western terminus of CR G18 is near Lockwood with the intersection of CR G14 and runs for approximately 16.4 miles.

=== Route description ===
County Route G18 begins at the intersection of CR G14 (Interlake Road) and proceeds east for several miles as a continuation of Jolon Road. There is a junction with CR G19 (Nacimiento Lake Drive) just a few hundred feet shy of its eastern terminus with US 101.

=== Major intersections ===
The entire route is in Monterey County.

Location	mi	km	Destinations	Notes
Lockwood			CR G14 (Jolon Road, Interlake Road) / Lockwood Jolon Road – King City, San Antonio Lake (South Shore), Nacimiento Lake	Western terminus
			CR G19 (Nacimiento Lake Drive) – Nacimiento Lake, San Antonio Lake	Northern terminus of CR G19
			US 101	Interchange; eastern terminus; US 101 exit 252
1.000 mi = 1.609 km; 1.000 km = 0.621 mi

== G19 ==
County Road G19
- Nacimiento Lake Drive
- Location: Monterey and San Luis Obispo counties

County Route G19 (CR G19), known entirely as Nacimiento Lake Drive, is a county road in San Luis Obispo and Monterey counties in the U.S. state of California. It runs from Interlake Road (CR G14) near Lake Nacimiento to Jolon Road (CR G18) west of the town of Bradley.

=== Route description ===
County Route G19 begins at its southern terminus at Interlake Road, which is a continuation of the CR G14 portion of Nacimiento Lake Drive. G19 heads northeast for approximately 1.25 miles (2 km) until the intersection with Vista Road. Vista Road provides access to Lake San Antonio, while G19 continues east, progressively turning north and crossing the San Antonio River before a sharp curve to the east. G19 then follows northeast along the San Antonio River for approximately one mile (1.6 km) before continuing north to the end at CR G18, a few hundred feet (30.48 meters) from U.S. Route 101 near Bradley.

=== Major intersections ===
County	Location	mi	km	Destinations	Notes
San Luis Obispo				CR G14 (Interlake Road, Nacimiento Lake Drive) – Bee Rock, San Antonio Lake, Nacimiento Lake	Southern terminus
Monterey				CR G18 (Jolon Road) – Bradley, San Antonio Lake, Lockwood	Northern terminus; connects to US 101
1.000 mi = 1.609 km; 1.000 km = 0.621 mi

== G20 ==
County Road G20
- Location: Monterey County
- Tourist routes: Laureles Grade

County Route G20 (CR G20), known entirely as Laureles Grade, is a county road in Monterey County, California, United States. The route is a steep, winding road running 6 miles (10 km) to connect Carmel Valley's CR G16 (Carmel Valley Road) with State Route 68 halfway between Monterey and Salinas. It is on the California Scenic Highway System.

=== Major intersections ===
The entire route is in Monterey County.

Location	mi	km	Destinations	Notes
Carmel Valley			CR G16 (Carmel Valley Road) – Carmel, Carmel Valley Village	Southern terminus
			SR 68	Northern terminus
1.000 mi = 1.609 km; 1.000 km = 0.621 mi

== G21 ==
County Road G21
- Capitol Expressway
- Location: Santa Clara County

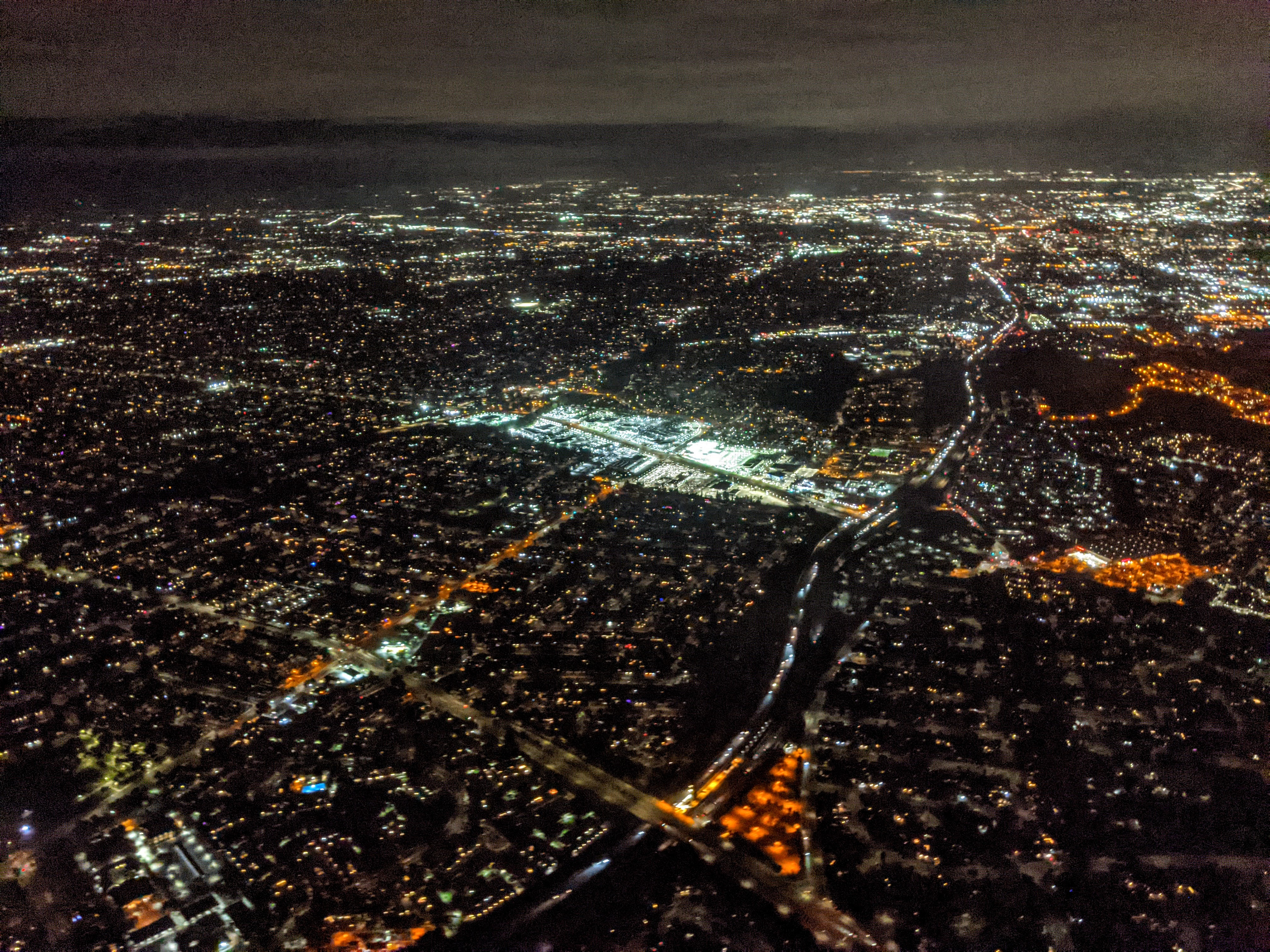
Night aerial view of Capitol Expressway Auto Mall (the brightly lit strip in the center), with CA 87 to its east (right)

County Route G21 (CR G21), more commonly known as Capitol Expressway, is a 9.5-mile (15.3 km) long east–west expressway completely in San Jose, California, United States, in Santa Clara County. Capitol Expressway is part of the Santa Clara County expressway system.

=== Route description ===
County Route G21/Capitol Expressway begins at an interchange with State Route 87, as a continuation of Capitol Expressway Auto Mall. It continues east and northeast to a junction with US 101 and then north into East San Jose. In East San Jose, Capitol Expressway turns west to intersect with I-680 and officially ends at Jackson Avenue, changing its name to East San Antonio Street.

Where Capitol Expressway turns west toward I-680 in Alum Rock, Capitol Avenue continues north, ending in Milpitas at an intersection with Montague Expressway.

=== History ===
Capitol Expressway was designated in 1978 from Almaden Expressway to US 101, including what is now Capitol Expressway Auto Mall. Construction on the eastern portion from US 101 to I-680 was not completed until 1997.

In the late 1990s the portion of the expressway from Almaden Expressway to SR 87 was transferred from Santa Clara County to the city of San Jose. San Jose then converted it into an auto row and renamed it Capitol Expressway Auto Mall.

Capitol Expressway is signed as G21 along its length.

=== Major intersections ===
The entire route is in San Jose, Santa Clara County.

mi	km	Destinations	Notes
		Capitol Expressway Auto Mall	Continuation beyond SR 87
		SR 87 (Guadalupe Freeway)	Interchange; western terminus; SR 87 north exit 1, south exit 1D
		Snell Road	
		Monterey Road	Interchange; former US 101 / SR 82
		Senter Road	
		McLaughlin Avenue	
		US 101 (Bayshore Freeway) – Gilroy, San Francisco	Interchange; former US 101 Byp.; US 101 exit 382
		Silver Creek Road (to King Road)	
		Aborn Road	Serves Evergreen Valley College
		Neiman Boulevard	No left turn from Neiman Boulevard to Capitol Expressway
		Quimby Road	Serves Eastridge
		Tully Road	Serves Eastridge
		Cunningham Avenue	Serves Reid–Hillview Airport
		Ocala Avenue	
		Story Road	
		Capitol Avenue, Excalibur Drive	
		I-680 (Sinclair Freeway) – Sacramento, San Jose	Interchange; eastern terminus; I-680 north exit 1C, south exit 1D
		San Antonio Street	Continuation beyond I-680
1.000 mi = 1.609 km; 1.000 km = 0.621 mi: Incomplete access
