= Paso Robles station =

Railway station in Paso Robles, California, US

Paso Robles, CA
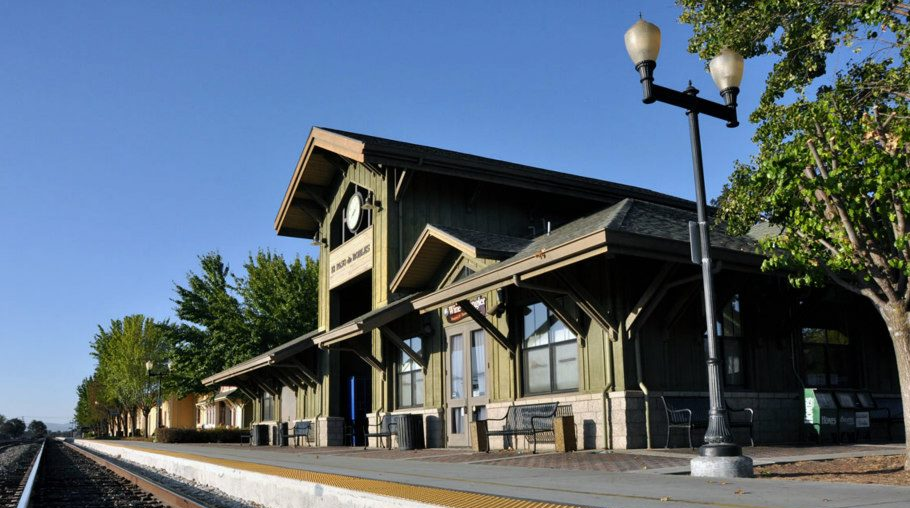
- Paso Robles station in 2012

General information
- Location: 800 Pine Street; Paso Robles, California; United States
- Coordinates: 35°37′22″N 120°41′16″W
- Owner: City of Paso Robles
- Line: UP Coast Subdivision
- Platforms: 1 side platform
- Tracks: 1
- Connections: Amtrak Thruway: 17, 18, 21; Monterey Salinas Transit: 83; Paso Express; San Luis Obispo Regional Transit Authority: 9

Construction
- Parking: Yes
- Accessible: Yes

Other information
- Station code: Amtrak: PRB

History
- Opened: October 31, 1886; April 14, 1996
- Closed: c. 1950s
- Rebuilt: October 1997

Passengers
- FY 2025: 20,833 (Amtrak)

Services
Preceding station	Amtrak	Following station
Salinas toward Seattle	Coast Starlight	San Luis Obispo toward Los Angeles
Former services
Preceding station	Southern Pacific Railroad	Following station
Wellsona toward San Francisco	Coast Line	Atascadero toward Los Angeles
Future services
Preceding station	Amtrak	Following station
King City toward Seattle	Coast Starlight	San Luis Obispo toward Los Angeles
Location

Paso Robles station is an intercity rail station in Paso Robles, California, United States. It is served by the daily Amtrak Coast Starlight, as well as by Amtrak Thruway bus services connecting with Pacific Surfliner and Gold Runner trains.

Amtrak service began on April 14, 1996. The current station building was constructed in 1997–98. The original 1886-built station building, just to the south, is occupied by retail space.
