= Metz, California =

Unincorporated community in California, United States

Metz
- Unincorporated community
- Location in California
- Coordinates: 36°21′18″N 121°12′42″W
- Country: United States
- State: California
- County: Monterey
- Elevation: 236 ft (72 m)

Metz (formerly Chalone) is an unincorporated community in the Salinas Valley, in Monterey County, California, United States. It is located on the Southern Pacific Railroad and County Route G15, 3 miles (4.8 km) northeast of Greenfield, at an elevation of 236 feet (72 m).

== History ==
The first European land exploration of Alta California, the Spanish Portolá expedition, camped in this vicinity on September 27, 1769, having followed the Salinas River from the south.

A post office operated at Metz from 1888 to 1933.

The place was originally called Chalone when the railroad was built to the site in 1886. Upon the establishment of the post office, the settlement was renamed Metz in honor of W.H.H. Metz, its first postmaster.
