= Eldon Dedini =

American cartoonist (1921-2006)

Eldon Dedini (June 29, 1921 – January 12, 2006) was an American cartoonist whose work appeared in Esquire, The New Yorker, Playboy and elsewhere.

== Life ==
Dedini was born in King City, California, on June 29, 1921; his father was a dairy farmer, his mother a schoolteacher. He studied at Salinas Junior College, where Leon Amyx was on the teaching staff, and then at the Chouinard Art Institute in Los Angeles. There he met Virginia Conroy; they were married on July 15, 1944. They adopted a baby boy called Giulio Martin in 1960.

Dedini died at his home outside of Carmel, Calif., on January 12, 2006 at the age of 84.

== Exhibitions ==
- Broccoli & Babes: The Cartoons and Posters of Eldon Dedini: November 4, 2005—January 20, 2006 at the Sasoontsi Gallery, Salinas, Calif.
- Monterey Museum of Art "Arriola, Dedini, Ketchum" 1982

== Awards ==
Dedini received the National Cartoonists Society's Gag Cartoon Award in 1958, 1961, 1964 and 1988.

== Bibliography ==
- Illustrations for Bantam Books editions of Max Shulman works:
  - Rally Round the Flag, Boys!, (1958) (1959)
  - Barefoot Boy with Cheek (1959)
  - Sleep Till Noon (1959)
  - I Was a Teen-Age Dwarf (1960)
  - The Feather Merchants
  - Anyone Got a Match (1965)
- The Dedini Gallery. Holt, Rinehart and Winston, New York (1961)
- A Much, Much Better World. Microsoft Press, Bellevue WA (1985)
- Fantagraphics Books published a posthumous collection of his work, An Orgy of Playboy's Eldon Dedini (ISBN 1-56097-727-2) in 2006. Introduction by political cartoonist Dennis Renault. The book is bundled with a documentary "Dedini: A Life of Cartoons" by Anson Musselman.

== Sources ==
- American National Biography Online
- New York Times report of death Retrieved January 14, 2006
- Monterey Herald obituary Retrieved January 14, 2006 (reprinted at emdashes.com
- "Broccoli and Babes," an article by Ben Bamsey in Artworks (winter 2005): 58-63
- Dedini's papers and original art are archived at the Cartoon Research Library at Ohio State University, which also has on file a videotape of his presentation at the 2001 Festival of Cartoon Art, sponsored by the Cartoon Research Library, during which Dedini showed slides of his cartoons and commented on them, offering a description of his working methods and attitudes.
