= KRKC-FM =

Coordinates: 35.952°N 121.002°W

- King City, California; United States
- Broadcast area: Central California Coast
- Frequency: 102.1 MHz
- Branding: Pop 102.1

Programming
- Format: Hot adult contemporary
- Affiliations: Premiere Networks; Compass Media Networks

Ownership
- Owner: Dimes Media Corporation
- Sister stations: KRKC

History
- First air date: January 30, 1989

Technical information
- Licensing authority: FCC
- Facility ID: 34885
- Class: B
- ERP: 2,850 watts
- HAAT: 546 meters (1,791 ft)
- Translator: 106.9 K295BZ (King City)

Links
- Public license information: Public file; LMS
- Website: pop1021.com

KRKC-FM (102.1 FM, "Pop 102.1") is a commercial radio station licensed to King City, California, United States, serving Monterey/Salinas and the Central California Coast. Owned by Dimes Media Corporation, it broadcasts a hot adult contemporary format, with studios located on San Antonio Drive in King City.

KRKC-FM's transmitter is on Williams Hill Lockwood.

== History ==
On January 30, 1989, KRKC-FM signed on the air. It is the FM counterpart to KRKC 1490 AM, which signed on in 1958. The two stations were owned by King City Communications Corporation until 2021. Dimes Media took ownership of the stations on July 28, 2021. KRKC-FM is a Class B station as authorized by the Federal Communications Commission (FCC).

The afternoon drive time DJ on KRKC-FM is Michael Davis, a 43-year broadcast professional, and has been with the KRKC group of stations 35 years. Davis was a former music director and on air personality at active rock station KNAC Los Angeles and was also music director/DJ at KFMG Albuquerque (now KBQI). Long-time general manager William Gittler semi-retired in 2012. Gittler served as GM for 30 years and died in 2024.

KRKC-FM news updates are handled by news director Darren Nutt. KRKC-FM "POP102.1" carries Las Vegas Raiders games via Compass Media Networks.
