= East Garrison, California =

Unincorporated community in California, United States

East Garrison
- Planned Community
- Interactive map of East Garrison
- Coordinates: 36°39′11″N 121°43′57″W
- Country: United States
- State: California
- County: Monterey
- Elevation: 154 ft (47 m)

East Garrison is a planned community in an unincorporated area in Monterey County, California, United States. It is on Reservation Road, (County Route G17) east of Marina and west of the Salinas River on the former Fort Ord. As of January 2023 East Garrison had 994 homes.
