= Bee Rock, California =

Unincorporated community in California, United States

- Unincorporated community
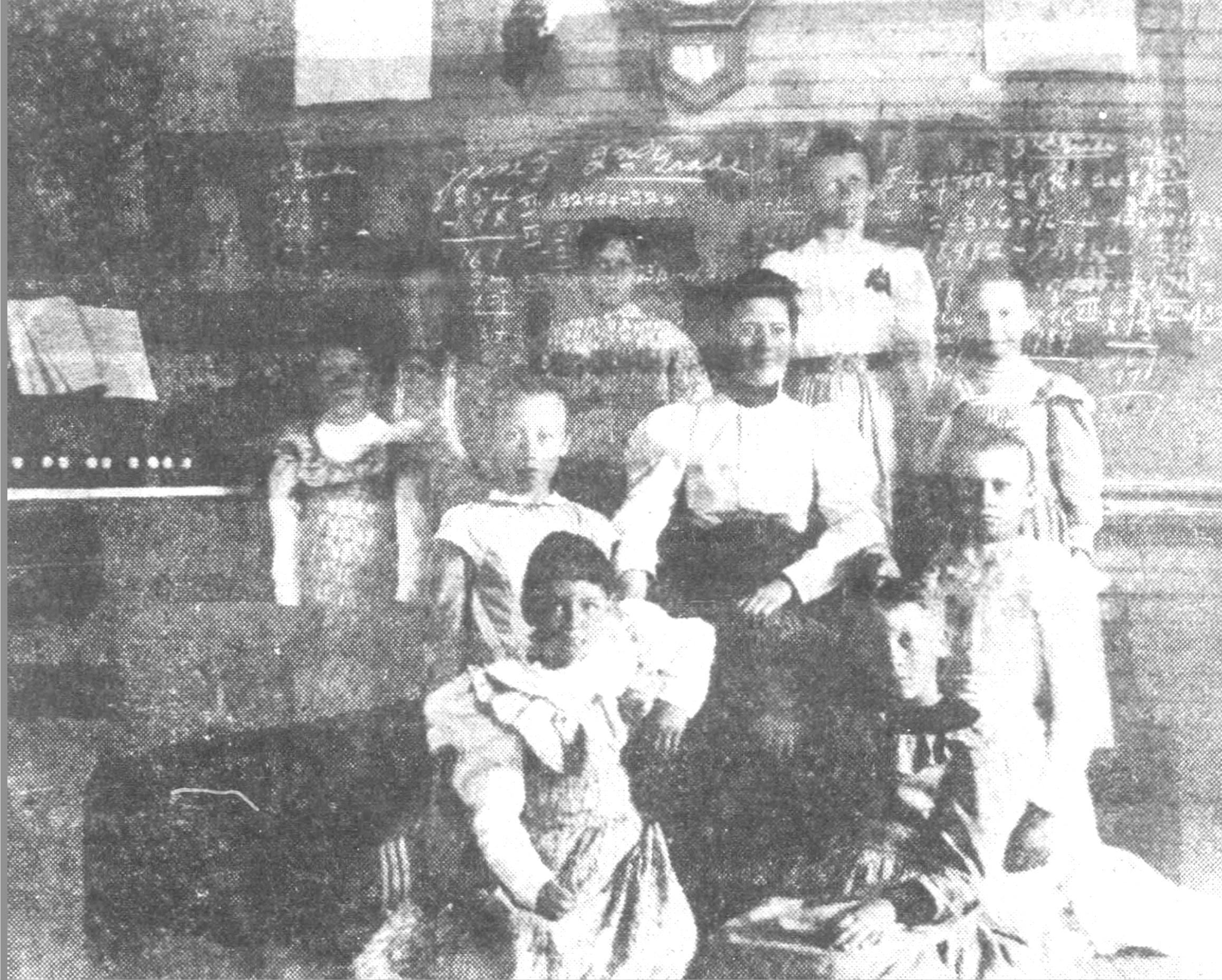
- Bee Rock School in 1898

- Location within California Location within the United States
- Coordinates: 35°47′14″N 120°56′21″W
- Country: United States
- State: California
- County: San Luis Obispo
- Elevation: 938 ft (286 m)
- Time zone: UTC-8 (Pacific (PST))
  - Summer (DST): UTC-7 (PDT)
- Area code: 805
- GNIS feature ID: 252851

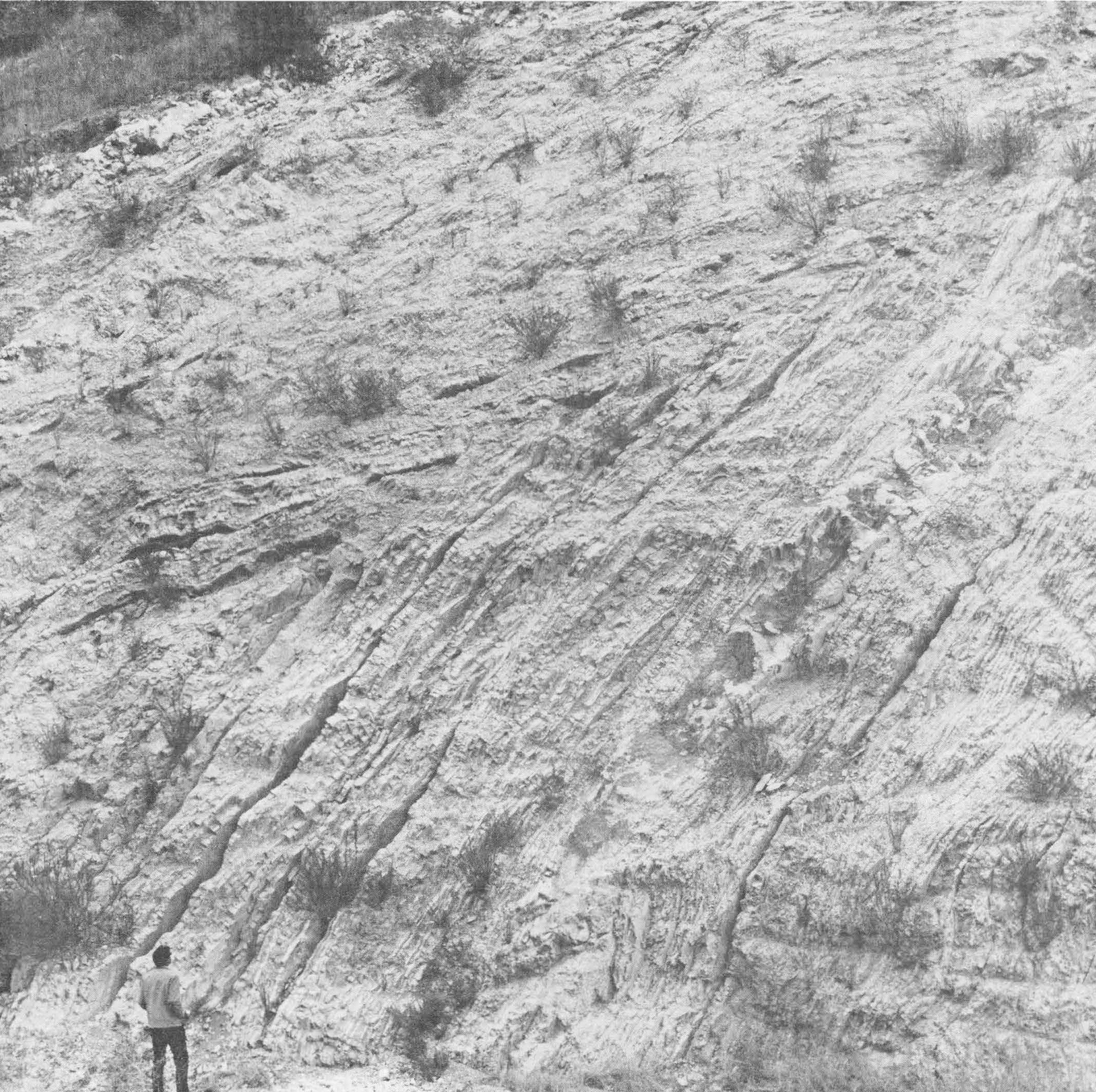
Bee Rock Fault showing deep fissures in strata

Bee Rock is a rural unincorporated community in northern San Luis Obispo County, California, United States. Bee Rock is 3 miles (4.8 km) east-northeast of Tierra Redondo Mountain, in the southeastern Santa Lucia Range. It is located on Interlake Road, between Lake Nacimiento and Lake San Antonio reservoirs. It is known for having, in the 19th century, the "largest bee-hive in the world" housed within a granite boulder.

== Settlement ==
Although Bee Rock was inhabited earlier, the Bee Rock Ranch, in 1862, was homesteaded by a family of German cobblers, the Langenbecks. Elizabeth Langenbeck died in 1928. She and her husband had nine children. In the 1940s Fred Langenbeck still lived in Bee Rock.

In 1881, the Allen family also homesteaded in Bee Rock, it has been written that Jim Hardy Allen named the area Bee Rock. In the 1940s the old Allen family Ranch in Bee Rock became the Bee Rock Lodge. Allen spearheaded the founding of the Bee Rock School in the early 1880s by organizing fund raisers attended by local families. Ernest KoneKamp, a local rancher donated an acre of land on which the school was built. The school building doubled as a community hall, and would on occasion operate as a church when a clergyman would visit the town.

The area once held a public school (Bee Rock School), and also had a community hall (Bee Rock Hall) that operated for 26 years before it burned down in 1930. Dances were among the events held there.

A small branch of the San Luis Obispo County Free Library opened in Bee Rock in 1929.

By 1951 the old Bee Rock School was abandoned. In 1972 there was still a Bee Rock Store in operation. A new Bee Rock School was built in 1972 to serve the community.

The Bee Rock Fault zone passes through the community of Bee Rock.

== The bee rock ==
In the late 19th century the community became known for having the "largest bee-hive in the world." A granite boulder, located near the Arroyo Alcalde, riddled with fissures was inhabited by a "vast population of bees, and overflow[ing] with honey", producing hundreds of pounds of honey per year.
