= King City station (Southern Pacific Railroad) =

Former railway station in California, USA

King City
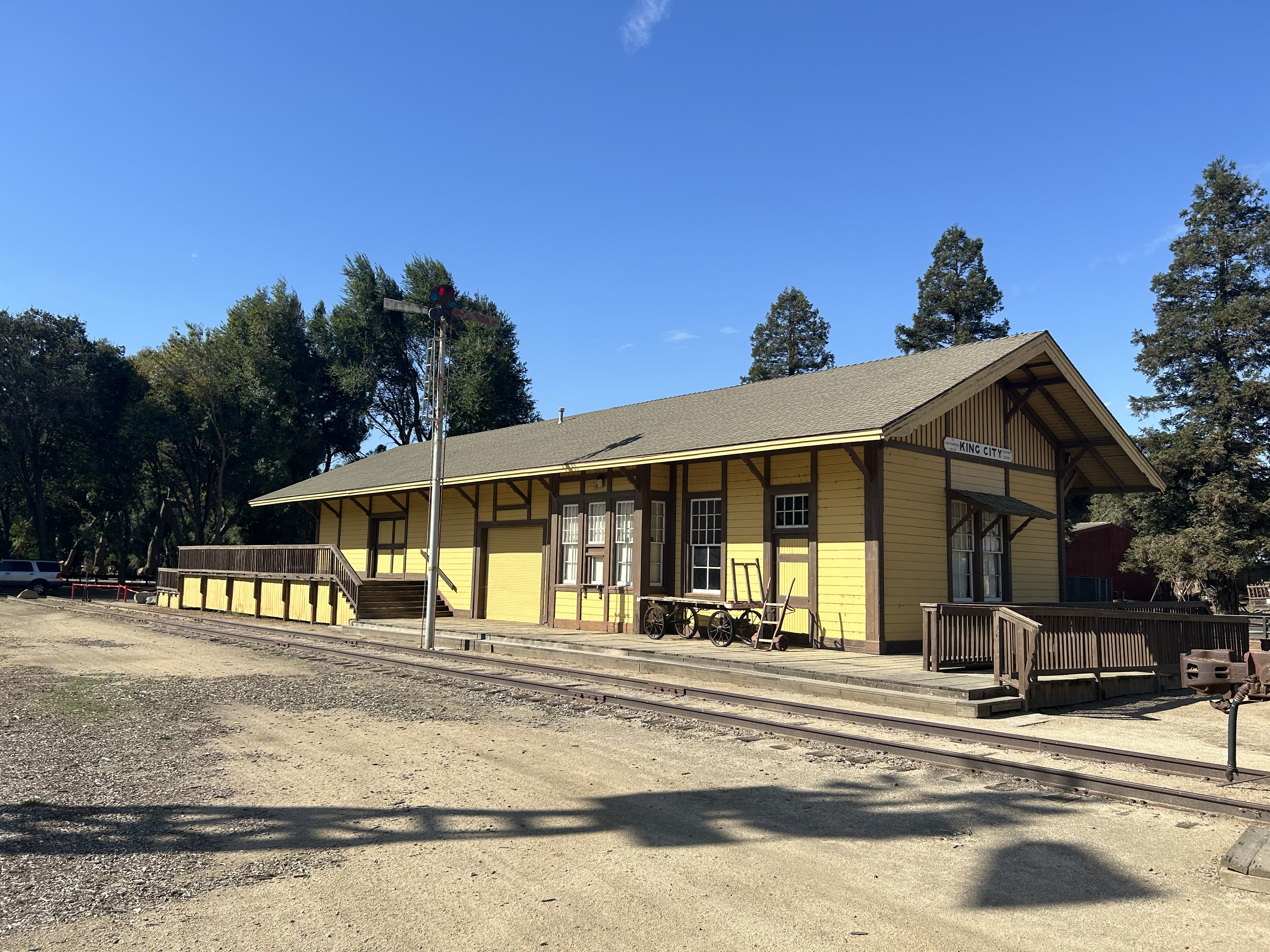
- King City station building, October 2024

General information
- Location: King City, California

History
- Opened: July 20, 1886
- Closed: c. 1940s
- Rebuilt: 1903

Former services
| Preceding station | Southern Pacific Railroad | Following station |
|---|---|---|
| Metz toward San Francisco | Coast Line | San Lucas toward Los Angeles |
Location

King City station is a former railway station in King City, California. The Southern Pacific Railroad began laying tracks south of Soledad in May 1886, with the line opening to King City on July 20. The station building was constructed in 1903. It was originally located near the intersection of First and Broadway along the railroad's Coast Line. (Note: 36.2145°N 121.1232°W) The station's proximity to the Southern Pacific Milling Company fueled the freight traffic emanating from King City. Passenger service to King City ceased in the 1940s.

After being abandoned and threatened by demolition, the station building was acquired from the railroad and moved to San Lorenzo Park in 1989, (Note: 36.2069°N 121.1474°W) becoming a part of the Monterey County Agricultural & Rural Life Museum.

Rail service is expected to return to King City with the opening of the King City Multimodal Transportation Center.
