= KRKC (AM) =

- King City, California; United States
- Broadcast area: South Monterey County
- Frequency: 1490 kHz

Programming
- Format: Country/Full service radio
- Affiliations: CBS Radio; Golden State Warriors; Oakland Athletics; San Francisco 49ers San Jose Sharks

Ownership
- Owner: Dimes Media Corporation
- Sister stations: KRKC-FM

History
- First air date: 1959

Technical information
- Licensing authority: FCC
- Facility ID: 54554
- Class: C
- Power: 1,000 watts unlimited
- Transmitter coordinates: 36°13′33.9″N 121°7′29.7″W
- Translators: 101.5 K268DW (King City); 104.9 K285FW (King City)

Links
- Public license information: Public file; LMS
- Website: krkccountry.com

KRKC (1490 kHz) is an AM radio station broadcasting a country and sports format. As of April 2012, the station is also broadcast on 104.9 MHz. The 104.9 signal is FM translator K285FW. Licensed to King City, California, United States, it serves the South Monterey County area. The station is currently owned by Dimes Media Corporation, and features programming provided from CBS Radio and Skyview Networks, including CA Headline News and local news and sports covering the Salinas Valley. Local sports play-by-play covers the four Salinas Valley High Schools; Soledad, King City, Greenfield and Gonzales. KRKC's sister station is KC 102 (102.1 KRKC-FM). 1490/104.9 airs Oakland Athletics baseball, San Francisco 49ers football, San Jose Sharks ice hockey, Golden State Warriors basketball, Thursday Night, Sunday Night, and Monday Night NFL play-by-play coverage.

KRKC signed on in 1959 on 1570 kHz with 250 watts daytime only. In 1963 it moved to 1490 kHz so it could stay on the air full-time.
