= King City Multimodal Transportation Center =

Proposed train station in California, United States

General information
- Location: King City, California
- Coordinates: 36°12′46″N 121°07′18″W
- Line: UP Coast Subdivision
- Platforms: 1 side platform (planned)

Construction
- Accessible: Yes

Other information
- Status: In planning

Proposed services
Preceding station	Amtrak	Following station
Salinas toward Seattle	Coast Starlight	Paso Robles toward Los Angeles
Location

King City Multimodal Transportation Center is a planned transit hub in King City, California. It is expected to become a stop along the daily Amtrak Coast Starlight as well as future regional rail services in Monterey County in addition to serving as a regional bus hub. Located at Pearl Street and First Street, it will reestablish rail service to King City after Southern Pacific closed its King City station in the 1940s. Construction is expected to begin in 2028 or 2029. Funding was partially provided by the California Transit and Intercity Rail Capital Program, as well as the State Rail Assistance Program via gas tax revenue from the Road Repair and Accountability Act.

The station will be built in phases, with the first phase consisting of the passenger platforms and a staging area for soldiers from nearby Fort Hunter Liggett. The level crossing at Pearl Street will be closed with Broadway extended across the tracks, allowing better pedestrian and vehicle access. Costs of the first phase are set at $51 million. A further phase of construction will feature a station building.
