= King City, California =

City in California, United States

- City
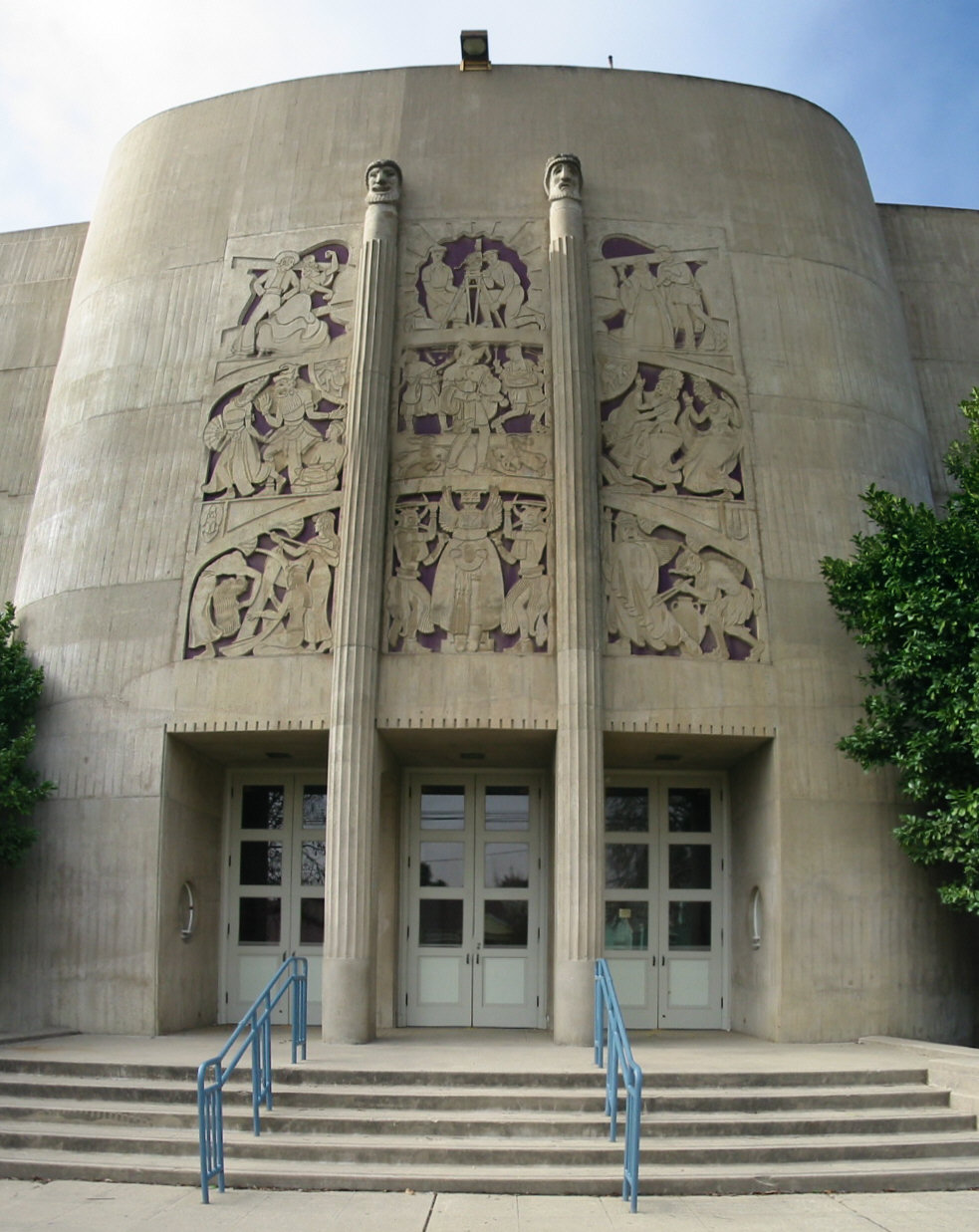
- The Robert Stanton Theater at King City High School (1939)
- Interactive map of King City, California
- Location in California Location in the United States
- Coordinates: 36°12′46″N 121°07′34″W
- Country: United States
- State: California
- County: Monterey
- Railway stop: 1886
- Incorporated: February 9, 1911
- Named for: Charles King

Government
  - Mayor: Mike LeBarre
  - State Senator: John Laird (D)
  - Assemblymember: Robert Rivas (D)
  - U. S. rep.: Zoe Lofgren (D)

Area
  - Total: 3.93 sq mi (10.2 km^{2})
  - Land: 3.80 sq mi (9.8 km^{2})
  - Water: 0.13 sq mi (0.34 km^{2}) 3.36%
- Elevation: 335 ft (102 m)

Population (2020)
  - Total: 13,332
  - Density: 3,508.4/sq mi (1,354.6/km^{2})
- Time zone: UTC-08:00 (PST)
  - Summer (DST): UTC-07:00 (PDT)
- ZIP code: 93930
- Area code: 831
- FIPS code: 06-38520
- GNIS feature IDs: 1652734, 2411544
- Website: www.kingcity.com

King City (variants: Kings City, City of King) is a city in Monterey County, California, United States. It is located on the Salinas River 51 miles (82 km) southeast of Salinas, at an elevation of 335 feet (102 m). It lies along U.S. Route 101 in the Salinas Valley of California's Central Coast. King City is a member of the Association of Monterey Bay Area Governments. The population was 13,332 at the 2020 census, up from 12,874 in 2010.

== History ==
The first European land exploration of Alta California, Don Gaspar de Portolá's Spanish expedition, camped on the Salinas River just south of today's King City on September 26, 1769, having followed the route of today's Jolon Road from the south. The land they camped on would later become part of King City.

The Dutton Hotel, Stagecoach Station, was located on Jolon Road in King City. What remains are ruins of an adobe inn that was established in 1849. The Dutton Hotel was a major stagecoach stop on El Camino Real in the late 1880s. The landmark was listed on the National Register of Historic Places on October 14, 1971.

King City was originally known as "Kings City" for its founder, Charles King. In 1884 Charles King acquired 13,000 acres (53 km^{2}) of the Mexican land grant Rancho San Lorenzo, originally given to Mariano and Feliciano Soberanes in the early 1840s during Mexican rule of California. King began growing 6,000 acres (2,400 ha) of wheat. In an effort to get his crop to market, King allowed the Southern Pacific Railroad to lay tracks across King Ranch land. The terminus was a station known as King's.

In 1886, the Southern Pacific Railroad completed service to King City station to serve the farms and ranches in the south Salinas Valley and to transport the goods to San Francisco and Los Angeles.

It was originally called "Hog Town" due to the passel of semi-wild hogs roaming the stubble fields. King wanted to name the town "Vanderhurst", after local merchant William Vanderhurst, but was outvoted and it was named for him. The city became known as Kings', then the City of King, and later simply King City.

The King City post office first opened in 1887. Edwards S. Brown, brother-in-law of C.H. King was appointed Postmaster. King City incorporated under the name "City of King" in 1911.

J. Ernst Steinbeck, father of the novelist John Steinbeck, claimed to have been the first permanent resident of King City. Steinbeck was certainly among the first settlers. He was the first agent for the Southern Pacific Milling Company, which built an early warehouse and flour mill alongside the railroad tracks running through town. The mill was built by R. M. Shackelford, an early California settler and businessman who owned sheep pasturage next to that of Charles King.

Agriculture has always played a role in King City history. Between 1910 and 1930, the city became famous for growing pink beans. King City Pinks were sold around the country, helped along by additional demand during World War I.

The Robert Stanton Auditorium, built in 1939 as a WPA Depression project, is an example of Art Moderne style, with elliptical rounded corners, Doric-style columns, an expansive curved stairway leading to recessed oak and glass double doors, and a bas-relief triptych by artist Jo Mora, above doors that depict notable multi-cultural scenes of historic importance. Mora's art is incorporated into the building's design both inside and out. In 1991, it was listed on the National Register of Historic Places.

== Geography ==
King City is in southeastern Monterey County in the Salinas Valley at an elevation of 330 feet (100 m) above sea level. It lies between Greenfield 13 miles (21 km) to the northwest and San Lucas 9 miles (14 km) to the southeast, all of them along U.S. Route 101. The amount of land area in King City is 3.8 square miles (9.8 km^{2}), of which 0.1 square miles (0.3 km^{2}), or 3.36%, are mapped as water. The Salinas River flows on the west side of the city; due to its sandy bed, portions of the river sometimes flow underground, especially during the summer months.

=== Climate ===
Climate chart for King City

King City has a semi-arid climate (BSk), although bordering on a Mediterranean climate (Csb), with very warm, mostly dry summers and cool, wet winters. The average January temperatures are a maximum of 64.1 °F (17.8 °C) and a minimum of 34.9 °F (1.6 °C). The average July temperatures are a maximum of 86.9 °F (30.5 °C) and a minimum of 51.0 °F (10.6 °C). There are an average of 50.6 days with highs of 90 °F (32 °C) or higher and an average of 49.7 days with lows of 32 °F (0 °C) or lower. The record high temperature was 116 °F (47 °C) on September 6, 2022. The record low temperature was 14 °F (−10 °C) on December 22–23, 1990.

Average annual precipitation is 11.24 inches (285 mm). There are an average of 40 days with measurable precipitation. The driest year was 1953 with 3.14 inches (80 mm). The most precipitation in one month was 10.50 inches (267 mm) in February 1998. The most precipitation in 24 hours was 3.72 inches (94 mm) on January 18, 1914. Although snow often falls in the winter in the Santa Lucia mountains west of the city, it is quite rare in the Salinas Valley; however, 5.3 inches (130 mm) fell in January 1957 and 3.0 inches (76 mm) fell in December 1954. The low humidity in the area contributes to freezing temperatures at night, and intense temperatures during daylight.

Climate data for King City, California (1991–2020 normals, extremes 1926–present)
Month	Jan	Feb	Mar	Apr	May	Jun	Jul	Aug	Sep	Oct	Nov	Dec	Year
Record high °F (°C)	86 (30)	90 (32)	100 (38)	104 (40)	108 (42)	112 (44)	111 (44)	113 (45)	116 (47)	109 (43)	95 (35)	91 (33)	115 (46)
Mean maximum °F (°C)	75.4 (24.1)	78.7 (25.9)	84.4 (29.1)	91.7 (33.2)	94.6 (34.8)	100.2 (37.9)	98.6 (37.0)	99.9 (37.7)	101.9 (38.8)	96.3 (35.7)	84.8 (29.3)	73.2 (22.9)	105.3 (40.7)
Mean daily maximum °F (°C)	63.3 (17.4)	65.3 (18.5)	69.9 (21.1)	73.9 (23.3)	78.0 (25.6)	82.8 (28.2)	84.9 (29.4)	85.2 (29.6)	85.1 (29.5)	79.9 (26.6)	69.6 (20.9)	62.0 (16.7)	75.0 (23.9)
Daily mean °F (°C)	50.8 (10.4)	52.8 (11.6)	56.1 (13.4)	58.9 (14.9)	62.8 (17.1)	66.8 (19.3)	69.4 (20.8)	69.4 (20.8)	68.3 (20.2)	63.2 (17.3)	55.2 (12.9)	49.6 (9.8)	60.3 (15.7)
Mean daily minimum °F (°C)	38.3 (3.5)	40.3 (4.6)	42.3 (5.7)	44.0 (6.7)	47.7 (8.7)	50.9 (10.5)	53.8 (12.1)	53.7 (12.1)	51.5 (10.8)	46.4 (8.0)	40.7 (4.8)	37.1 (2.8)	45.6 (7.6)
Mean minimum °F (°C)	27.4 (−2.6)	29.8 (−1.2)	32.7 (0.4)	35.4 (1.9)	40.0 (4.4)	43.7 (6.5)	47.6 (8.7)	48.0 (8.9)	43.7 (6.5)	36.3 (2.4)	29.6 (−1.3)	25.9 (−3.4)	24.0 (−4.4)
Record low °F (°C)	15 (−9)	19 (−7)	22 (−6)	24 (−4)	31 (−1)	36 (2)	34 (1)	31 (−1)	32 (0)	23 (−5)	20 (−7)	14 (−10)	14 (−10)
Average precipitation inches (mm)	2.44 (62)	2.54 (65)	1.98 (50)	0.83 (21)	0.35 (8.9)	0.04 (1.0)	0.01 (0.25)	0.01 (0.25)	0.06 (1.5)	0.54 (14)	0.98 (25)	2.05 (52)	11.83 (300)
Average precipitation days (≥ 0.01 in)	8.8	9.2	7.8	5.2	2.6	0.5	0.3	0.2	0.6	2.4	4.6	8.7	50.9
Source: NOAA

== Demographics ==
Historical population
Census	Pop.	Note	%±
1890	253		—
1920	1,048		—
1930	1,483		41.5%
1940	1,768		19.2%
1950	2,347		32.7%
1960	2,937		25.1%
1970	3,717		26.6%
1980	5,495		47.8%
1990	7,634		38.9%
2000	11,094		45.3%
2010	12,874		16.0%
2020	13,332		3.6%

=== Racial and ethnic composition ===
King City, California – Racial and ethnic composition Note: the US Census treats Hispanic/Latino as an ethnic category. This table excludes Latinos from the racial categories and assigns them to a separate category. Hispanics/Latinos may be of any race.
Race / Ethnicity (NH = Non-Hispanic)	Pop 2000	Pop 2010	Pop 2020	% 2000	% 2010	% 2020
White alone (NH)	1,892	1,251	931	17.05%	9.72%	6.98%
Black or African American alone (NH)	17	49	30	0.15%	0.38%	0.23%
Native American or Alaska Native alone (NH)	35	46	20	0.32%	0.36%	0.15%
Asian alone (NH)	131	166	232	1.18%	1.29%	1.74%
Pacific Islander alone (NH)	8	7	12	0.07%	0.05%	0.09%
Other race alone (NH)	6	27	41	0.05%	0.21%	0.31%
Mixed race or Multiracial (NH)	83	62	130	0.75%	0.48%	0.98%
Hispanic or Latino (any race)	8,922	11,266	11,936	80.42%	87.51%	89.53%
Total	11,094	12,874	13,332	100.00%	100.00%	100.00%

=== 2020 census ===
As of the 2020 census, King City had a population of 13,332. The population density was 3,511.2 inhabitants per square mile (1,355.7/km^{2}). The median age was 28.7 years; 33.6% of residents were under the age of 18 and 7.2% were 65 years of age or older. For every 100 females, there were 105.7 males, and for every 100 females age 18 and over there were 105.9 males.

The racial makeup of the city was 22.6% White, 0.4% African American, 5.3% Native American, 2.0% Asian, 0.2% Pacific Islander, 51.0% from other races, and 18.4% from two or more races. Hispanic or Latino people of any race were 89.5% of the population.

The census reported that 13,277 people (99.6% of the population) lived in households, 10 people (0.1%) lived in non-institutionalized group quarters, and 45 (0.3%) were institutionalized. 99.8% of residents lived in urban areas and 0.2% lived in rural areas.

There were 3,282 households, of which 60.2% had children under the age of 18 living in them. Of all households, 53.7% were married-couple households, 14.1% had a male householder with no spouse or partner present, and 20.9% had a female householder with no spouse or partner present. About 11.7% of households were one person, and 4.9% had someone living alone who was 65 or older. The average household size was 4.05, and there were 2,734 families (83.3% of all households).

There were 3,465 housing units at an average density of 912.6 units per square mile (352.4 units/km^{2}), of which 3,282 (94.7%) were occupied. Of the occupied units, 44.4% were owner-occupied and 55.6% were occupied by renters. The homeowner vacancy rate was 1.0%, and the rental vacancy rate was 2.8%.

=== 2023 ACS 5-year estimates ===
In 2023, the US Census Bureau estimated that 41.4% of the population were foreign-born. Of all people aged 5 or older, 18.6% spoke only English at home, 79.5% spoke Spanish, 0.7% spoke other Indo-European languages, 0.7% spoke Asian or Pacific Islander languages, and 0.5% spoke other languages. Of those aged 25 or older, 50.8% were high school graduates and 12.9% had a bachelor's degree.

The median household income in 2023 was $63,090, and the per capita income was $20,675. About 14.0% of families and 19.8% of the population were below the poverty line.

=== 2010 census ===
At the 2010 census King City had a population of 12,874. The population density was 3,231.8 inhabitants per square mile (1,247.8/km^{2}). The racial makeup of King City was 6,173 (47.9%) White, 150 (1.2%) African American, 347 (2.7%) Native American, 172 (1.3%) Asian, 8 (0.1%), Pacific Islander, 5,451 (42.3%) from other races, and 573 (4.5%) from two or more races. Hispanic or Latino of any race were 11,266 persons (87.5%).

The census reported that 12,815 people (99.5% of the population) lived in households, no one lived in non-institutionalized group quarters and 59 (0.5%) were institutionalized.

There were 3,008 households, 1,852 (61.6%) had children under the age of 18 living in them, 1,823 (60.6%) were opposite-sex married couples living together, 386 (12.8%) had a female householder with no husband present, 272 (9.0%) had a male householder with no wife present. There were 188 (6.3%) unmarried opposite-sex partnerships, and 21 (0.7%) same-sex married couples or partnerships. 412 households (13.7%) were one person and 186 (6.2%) had someone living alone who was 65 or older. The average household size was 4.26. There were 2,481 families (82.5% of households); the average family size was 4.47.

The age distribution was 4,374 people (34.0%) under the age of 18, 1,819 people (14.1%) aged 18 to 24, 3,937 people (30.6%) aged 25 to 44, 1,984 people (15.4%) aged 45 to 64, and 760 people (5.9%) who were 65 or older. The median age was 25.9 years. For every 100 females, there were 115.7 males. For every 100 females age 18 and over, there were 119.3 males.

There were 3,218 housing units at an average density of 807.8 per square mile, of the occupied units 1,394 (46.3%) were owner-occupied and 1,614 (53.7%) were rented. The homeowner vacancy rate was 3.2%; the rental vacancy rate was 3.4%. 5,586 people (43.4% of the population) lived in owner-occupied housing units and 7,229 people (56.2%) lived in rental housing units.

== Media ==
=== Radio and television ===
Local radio stations include KEXA-FM – 93.9, KRKC-AM – 1490, 102 KRKC-FM, and KDON-FM 102.5. Television service for the community comes from the Monterey–Salinas–Santa Cruz designated market area (DMA).

=== Newspapers ===
Local newspapers include the Salinas Californian and the town's own weekly, The King City Rustler, which is owned by the Weeklys media group.

The Rustler was founded in 1901 by Fred Vivian, who reportedly went into a local barber shop, sold subscriptions to all the customers and then passed around a hat for them to suggest names for the newspaper. "The Rustler" was the one he drew out.

Vivian was later succeeded as publisher by his grandson Harry Casey, who was called home to King City in 1952 to take over management of the newspaper by his aunt Ruth Steglich after the death of her husband, then-publisher Bill Steglich. He served as co-publisher until Ruth Steglich's death and publisher until declining health forced him to sell The Rustler and three other regional weeklies to News Media, Inc. in 1995.

Casey died in 1998. Both he and Vivian are members of the California Newspaper Hall of Fame. Their sons Rich and Bill operated Casey Printing in King City until 2023.

Weeklys Media Group affiliate New SV Media purchased the Rustler in July 2019, returning it to California ownership after 24 years of ownership by the Illinois-based firm.

=== Film location ===
The 1972 film The Candidate was shot in King City.

== Infrastructure ==
=== Transportation ===
Bus service in King City is provided by Monterey-Salinas Transit.

King City is served by Amtrak Thruway, as the passenger train that passes through the community does not stop. In 2018, King City was denied a $21 million TIRCP grant to build a multimodal transportation center which would provide connections to Amtrak between Paso Robles and Salinas. City officials have said they will apply again in the future. A $1.5 million grant was approved by the state government the following year, providing funds to design the Amtrak platform. King City Multimodal Transportation Center is expected to begin construction in 2028 or 2029.

== Notable people ==
- Eldon Dedini, cartoonist
- Jim Mankins (1944-2004), King City High School running back who played for Oklahoma and Florida State
- George Taylor Morris (1947–2009), radio host

== In popular culture ==
King City is mentioned repeatedly in John Steinbeck's novel East of Eden. The book is principally set in the surrounding Salinas Valley.

King City is revealed to be the home town of The Man in the Tan Jacket in the novel Welcome to Night Vale, and the town is a major part of the plot.

== See also ==
- Coastal California
- List of school districts in Monterey County, California
- List of tourist attractions in Monterey County, California
- Mee Memorial Hospital
