= Lockwood, Monterey County, California =

Unincorporated community in California, United States

Lockwood
- Census-designated place
- Location in Monterey County, California

- Location within California Location within the United States
- Coordinates: 35°56′39″N 121°05′00″W
- Country: United States
- State: California
- County: Monterey

Area
  - Total: 10.907 sq mi (28.250 km^{2})
  - Land: 10.873 sq mi (28.162 km^{2})
  - Water: 0.034 sq mi (0.088 km^{2}) 0.31%
- Elevation: 971 ft (296 m)

Population (2020)
  - Total: 368
  - Density: 33.8/sq mi (13.1/km^{2})
- Time zone: UTC-8 (Pacific (PST))
  - Summer (DST): UTC-7 (PDT)
- ZIP Code: 93932
- Area code: 831
- GNIS feature IDs: 1660933; 2583058

Lockwood is an unincorporated community and census-designated place (CDP) in Monterey County, California, United States. As of the 2020 census it had a population of 368.

It is a small community consisting of farms, ranches, and vineyards, in a broad valley encompassed by the coastal mountains. The ZIP Code is 93932, and the community is inside area code 831.

== History ==
The first post office opened in 1888. The name honors Belva Lockwood, candidate for President of the United States in 1884 and 1888 on the Equal Rights Party ticket.

== Geography ==
Lockwood is in southern Monterey County, 6 miles (10 km) east-southeast of Jolon, 1.8 miles (2.9 km) north of the mouth of Tule Canyon, 3.0 miles (4.8 km) north of the San Antonio River, and 9.3 miles (15.0 km) north of Bryson, at an elevation of 971 feet (296 m). It is 9 miles (14 km) northwest of Lake San Antonio, a destination for boaters and wakeboarders, and 10 miles (16 km) southeast of Fort Hunter Liggett.

According to the United States Census Bureau, the CDP covers an area of 10.9 square miles (28 km^{2}), of which 99.69% is land and 0.31% is water.

There is a post office in Lockwood and a community center. Lockwood also encompasses the San Antonio Valley Vineyards, including several more vineyards and a few olive groves. There is extensive grazing land and cattle ranching in the area, and some families have been here ever since the town was founded, ranching and farming for generations.

=== Climate ===
This region experiences hot and dry summers, with average monthly temperatures above 90 °F (32 °C). According to the Köppen Climate Classification system, Lockwood has a warm-summer Mediterranean climate, abbreviated "Csb" on climate maps.

== Demographics ==
Historical population
| Census | Pop. | Note | %± |
|---|---|---|---|
| 2010 | 379 | | — |
| 2020 | 368 | | −2.9% |
U.S. Decennial Census; 2000 2010

Lockwood first appeared as a census designated place in the 2010 U.S. census.

The 2020 United States census reported that Lockwood had a population of 368. The population density was 33.8 inhabitants per square mile (13.1/km^{2}). The racial makeup of Lockwood was 242 (65.8%) White, 10 (2.7%) African American, 4 (1.1%) Native American, 8 (2.2%) Asian, 1 (0.3%) Pacific Islander, 62 (16.8%) from other races, and 41 (11.1%) from two or more races. Hispanic or Latino of any race were 112 persons (30.4%).

The whole population lived in households. There were 145 households, out of which 34 (23.4%) had children under the age of 18 living in them, 71 (49.0%) were married-couple households, 2 (1.4%) were cohabiting couple households, 22 (15.2%) had a female householder with no partner present, and 50 (34.5%) had a male householder with no partner present. 37 households (25.5%) were one person, and 11 (7.6%) were one person aged 65 or older. The average household size was 2.54. There were 98 families (67.6% of all households).

The age distribution was 78 people (21.2%) under the age of 18, 26 people (7.1%) aged 18 to 24, 91 people (24.7%) aged 25 to 44, 93 people (25.3%) aged 45 to 64, and 80 people (21.7%) who were 65 years of age or older. The median age was 42.7 years. For every 100 females, there were 130.0 males.

There were 168 housing units at an average density of 15.5 units per square mile (6.0 units/km^{2}), of which 145 (86.3%) were occupied. Of these, 83 (57.2%) were owner-occupied, and 62 (42.8%) were occupied by renters.
