= Rancho Bolsa de las Escorpinas =

Mexican land grant

Coordinates: 36.760°N 121.690°W

Rancho Bolsa de las Escorpinas was a 6,416-acre (25.96 km^{2}) Mexican land grant in present-day Monterey County, California given in 1837 by Governor Juan B. Alvarado to Salvador Espinoza. The grant was northwest of present-day Salinas, bounded on the south by today's Espinosa Lake. Espinosa Road runs east–west through the former rancho lands.

== History ==
The first European land exploration of Alta California, the Spanish Portolà expedition, camped in the vicinity of Espinosa Lake on October 7, 1769. The party had spent the previous six nights near Blanco and continued north the next day to the Pajaro River, staying to the inland side of Elkhorn Slough.

Salvador Maria Espinoza (1796–) married Maria Josefa Lugarda Castro (1796–1848) in 1814. Espinosa served in a number of public offices in Monterey including alcade and regidor. He was mayordomo (administrator) at Mission Soledad in 1836–1839. He received the two square league Rancho Bolsa de las Escorpinas in 1837. Salvador's brother, José Trinidad Espinoza, was grantee of neighboring Rancho Los Gatos or Santa Rita. Salvador's son, Jose Carlos Cayetano Espinosa, was the grantee of Rancho Posa de los Ositos.

With the cession of California to the United States following the Mexican-American War, the 1848 Treaty of Guadalupe Hidalgo provided that the land grants would be honored. As required by the Land Act of 1851, a claim for Rancho Bolsa de las Escorpinas was filed with the Public Land Commission in 1852, and the grant was patented to Salvador Espinoza in 1876.

== See also ==
- Ranchos of California
- List of Ranchos of California
