= Blanco, Monterey County, California =

Unincorporated community in California, United States

Blanco
- Unincorporated community
- Location in California
- Coordinates: 36°40′43″N 121°44′34″W
- Country: United States
- State: California
- County: Monterey
- Elevation: 23 ft (7 m)

Blanco (Spanish for "White") is an unincorporated community in Monterey County, California, United States. It is located on the Salinas River, around the Blanco Road crossing, 4.5 miles (7.2 km) west of Salinas, at an elevation of 23 feet (7 m).

== Portolá expedition ==
A crucial decision faced the leaders of the first European land exploration of Alta California, the Spanish Portolá expedition, which camped on the Salinas River in this vicinity for several days, October 1–6, 1769. From this camp, the expedition leaders ascended the hills to the west (inside today's Fort Ord, from which vantage they saw Monterey Bay for the first time (the scouts had seen it the day before). Portolá himself, with 8 soldiers, went out to Monterey to verify the scouts' report that they had not seen the great port described by Sebastian Vizcaino - the ultimate goal of the expedition. Monterey harbor didn't meet their expectations, even though they recognized Vizcaino's "Point of Pines" (Monterey Peninsula) and "Rio de Carmelo" (Carmel River) beyond. Supplies were running low, and a meeting of the party leadership was held on October 4 to decide whether to turn around and return to San Diego. The decision to continue searching to the north was unanimous, with all voters recording written statements:

"Having heard and considered attentively all the opinions of the officers who are with me on this expedition, it is my vote that the expedition rest in this place for a period of six days, and that it should continue its march in quest of the Port of Monterey as far as is humanly possible. In this case, a place will be selected to establish ourselves as well as possible, and no long excursion will be undertaken inasmuch as in the going and coming much time would be lost. - Gaspar de Portolá.

Conclusion of the council held on this date:

- Vote of Don Miguel Costanso. He concurs in that, at the expiration of six days, the whole expedition set out together.
- Vote of Don Pedro Fages. He concurs in that, at the expiration of six days, the whole expedition set out together.
- Vote of Don Fernando de Rivera y Moncada, second in command of the expedition. He agrees that the expedition rest for a period of six days.
- Decision of the commander of the expedition. He votes and concurs with the others, in that the expedition continue its march at the end of six days.
- Vote of Father Gomez. He agrees that the expedition set out at the end of six days.
- Vote of Father Crespi. He says that he agrees in the words of the decision of the council."

== Rancho Las Salinas ==
The area around Blanco was included in the Rancho Las Salinas Spanish land grant in 1795. It was the first land grant in the Monterey Bay area but, because Spanish colonial law forbade private land ownership, the grant was simply permission to use the land. Because of the uncertain nature of these early grants, many were never claimed and/or developed. The Rancho Las Salinas claim was abandoned and, in 1839, a new smaller grant of full ownership was made under Mexican law.

== Later history ==
A post office operated at Blanco from 1873 to 1917, with an interruption for a time in 1878, and from 1930 to 1941. The name honors Tom White, a sailor who jumped ship in Monterey in 1840 and settled at the place; locals called him Tomas Blanco - a translation of his name into Spanish.
