= Salinas Dam =

Dam in California, United States

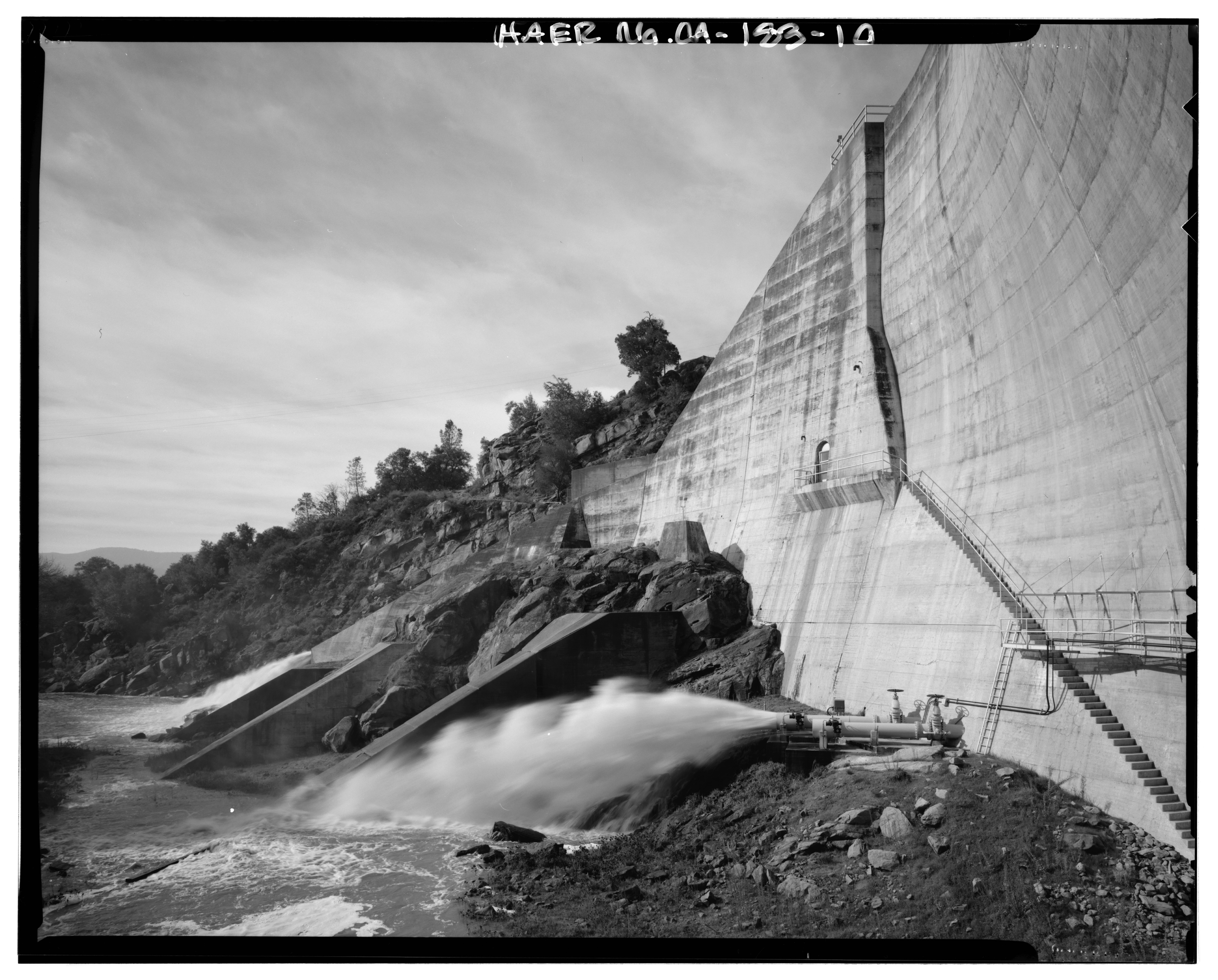
- Salinas Dam, taken facing North (Survey Number HAER CA-183). The intake pipes can be seen spilling excess water from the Santa Margarita Reservoir into the Salinas River.
- Interactive map of Salinas Dam
- Country: United States
- Location: San Luis Obispo County, California
- Coordinates: 35.3372°N 120.5027°W
- Construction began: 1941; 85 years ago
- Opening date: January 1942; 84 years ago
- Owner: U.S. Army Corps of Engineers
- Operator: City of San Luis Obispo

Dam and spillways
- Type of dam: concrete
- Impounds: Salinas River
- Height: 135 ft (41 m)
- Length: 23,800 ft (7,300 m)
- Dam volume: 12,033,000 yd^{3} (9,200,000 m^{3})

Reservoir
- Creates: Santa Fe Flood Control Basin
- Total capacity: 26,000 acre⋅ft (32,000 dam^{3})
- Active capacity: 23,842.90 acre⋅ft (29,409.78 dam^{3})
- Inactive capacity: 46,000 acre⋅ft (57,000 dam^{3})
- Catchment area: 236 mi^{2} (610 km^{2})
- Surface area: 1,000 acres (400 ha)
- Normal elevation: 1,300.74 feet (396.47 m)

The Salinas Dam is a dam built on the Salinas River in San Luis Obispo County, California. Designed by Raymond A. Hill, the gravity dam features an arched design with an open spillway. The War Department began construction on the dam in mid-1941, as World War II began to reach the Pacific. The original intent of the dam was to supply water to Camp San Luis Obispo, which the Army was considering expanding to meet military needs. However, the camp's wells ultimately provided sufficient water to the camp, and the reservoir water was never required or used by the military. Today, the dam operations are leased by the city of San Luis Obispo, to supply water to the city and surrounding agricultural areas. The reservoir created by the dam is known as the Santa Margarita Lake, or Santa Margarita Reservoir.

== Construction, design, and specifications ==
The Salinas Dam is a gravity dam with an arched design. The dam is built at an angle to allow overflow in the event that the lake level surpasses a safe height or capacity. The dam is 135 feet (41 m) high, and is built to withstand a maximum theoretical capacity of 26,000 acre-feet (32,000,000 m^{3}) of water, and a maximum water level of 1,300.74 feet (396.47 m). The intake system of the dam is composed of three separate intakes. Two of the three intakes are flexible 15-foot (4.6 m) snorkels, and the third is a fixed type. The actual capacity of the dam due to natural settling of sediments is now 23,842.90 acre-feet.

The dam is almost entirely constructed of concrete, and was originally designed to include a steel spillway gate. However, the steel gate was installed at the Friant Dam near Fresno, instead, due to concerns that the dam would not be capable of holding the additional water. To date, the spillway remains as an open concrete ramp. This spillway is located at the north end of the dam and is 19 feet (5.8 m). With a gate installed to prevent the reservoir water from flowing over the spillway, it is estimated that the capacity of the reservoir could increase by 22,000 acre-feet (27,000,000 m^{3}), to a total of 46,000 acre-feet (57,000,000 m^{3}), provided the structure of the dam would be able to withstand the added pressure.

On May 21, 1941, the Army awarded a contract to two engineers to design and build the dam. The engineers forecasted that the dam would take a year to complete, but the Army would only allow six months for completion. Planning, surveying, and construction were accelerated, and the dam was completed within the allotted timeframe, in early January 1942.

The Salinas Dam project included not only the construction of the dam itself, but also the construction of a one mile (1.6 km) long tunnel through the Santa Lucia Mountain Range, and an additional 9.2 miles (14.8 km) of 24-inch (610 mm) reinforced concrete pipe to route the water. The one mile (1.6 km) tunnel, known as the Cuesta tunnel, was cement lined and approximately six feet (1.8 m) wide by eight feet (2.4 m) tall. The tunnel would allow the water to flow, by gravity, to the water treatment plant for the city of San Luis Obispo.

Summary of Salinas Dam Specifications
Dam Feature	Measure
Dam Height	135 feet
Maximum Water Level (without spillway gate)	1300.74 feet
Maximum Theoretical Capacity (without spillway gate)	26,000 acre-feet
Maximum Capacity (without spillway gate)	23,842.90 acre-feet
Maximum Theoretical Capacity (with spillway gate)	46,000 acre-feet

== Water source and flow ==
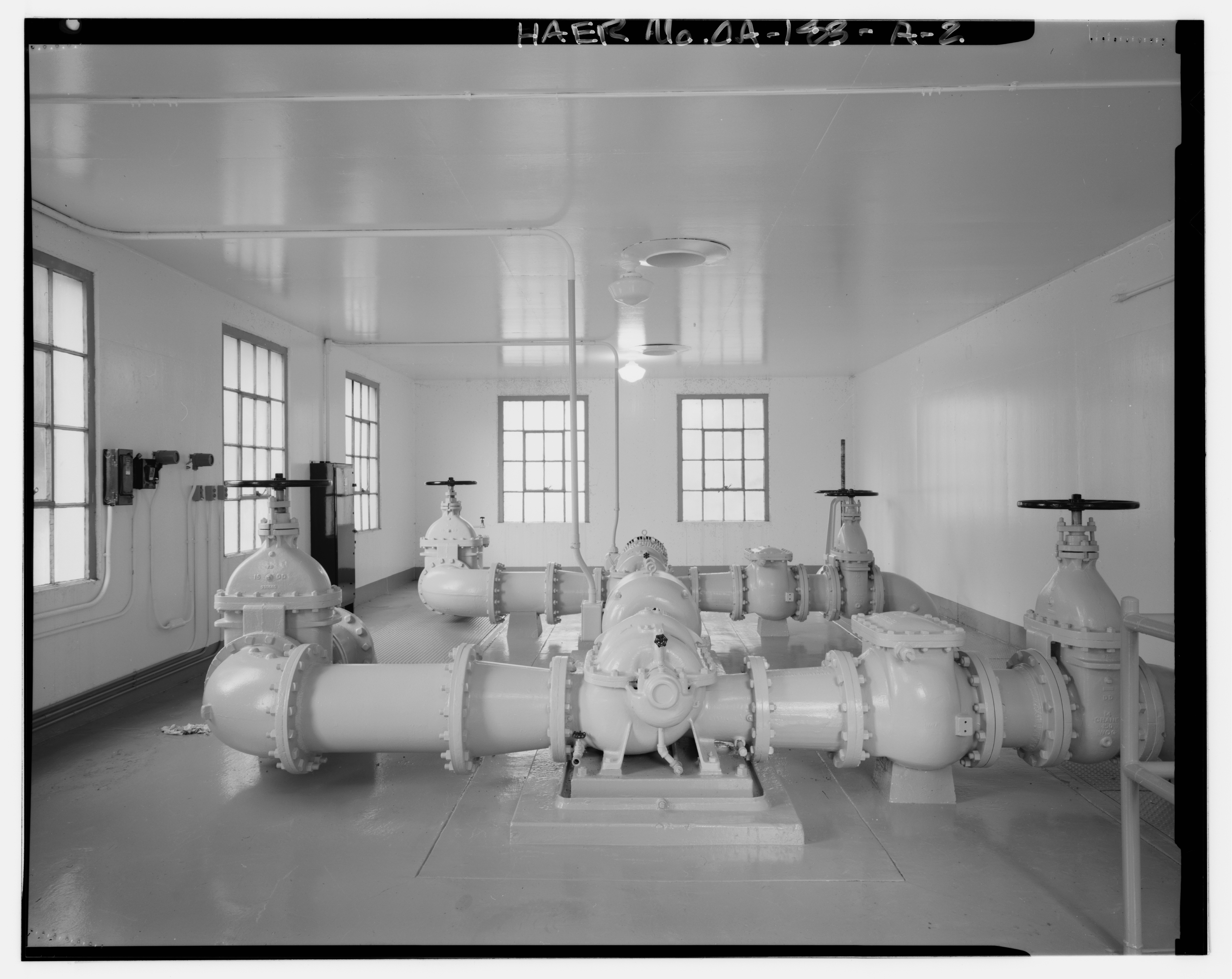
Picture of the interior of the pumphouse before the Cuesta tunnel. This pumphouse is located at the base of the Santa Lucia mountain range, and helps pump water through the Cuesta tunnel towards the city of San Luis Obispo.

The watershed that feeds the Santa Margarita Reservoir is 112 square miles, with the dam collecting water from the Salinas River, as well as three of its tributaries: Alamo Creek, Salsipuedes Creek, and Toro Creek. In the event that the reservoir's surface water level meets or exceeds 1267 feet of elevation, water can flow by gravity to a booster station near the Santa Lucia mountain range. However, when the surface level of the reservoir falls below this amount, it must be pumped to the booster station. Either way, once the water reaches the mountains, it must be pumped for the additional mile to the entrance of the Cuesta tunnel, through the Cuesta tunnel, and another additional mile before gravity can again be used to transport the water the rest of the way to the water treatment plant.

== Water rights ==
The dam was originally owned by the United States Army, but was transferred to the Army Corps of Engineers in April 1947. Several months later, in July 1947, the Army Corps of Engineers and the County of San Luis Obispo Flood Control and Water Conservation District made an agreement that the District would assume the operation and maintenance of the dam and related operations. In 1988, the County Water District made an additional agreement with the Army Corps of Engineers to established a water quality monitoring program.

San Luis Obispo now holds water rights up to 45,000 acre-feet from the reservoir; nearly the theoretical capacity of the dam with a flood gate installed.

== Talk of expansion ==
The city of San Luis Obispo investigated the feasibility of expanding the dam as a part of its 2013 Salinas Reservoir Expansion Study. This study explored the option of installing a spillway gate on the dam, and transferring the dam ownership completely from the Army Corps of Engineers to an unspecified “local” entity. Seismic simulation tests were conducted as part of this study, and it was found that at the proposed increased water level, the dam likely not maintain structural integrity. It was also found that, even at the lower historic water capacity, the dam could possibly fail during a prolonged earthquake, but was within acceptable ranges.

Ultimately, the expansion did not come to fruition, and the ownership of the dam stayed in the hands of the Army Corps of Engineers.

== Controversy ==
It took only six months to build the dam, including planning, streambed surveying, and construction. The expedited construction has made many question the dam's structural integrity, including the engineers involved in its construction. The dam was actually found to leak where the supports contacted the canyon walls, and concrete was later pumped into the canyon walls to help reduce the leakage.

== See also ==
- Santa Margarita Lake
- List of dams in California
