= Rancho Posa de los Ositos =

Mexican land grant in California

Coordinates: 36.290°N 121.220°W

Rancho Posa de los Ositos was a 16,939-acre (68.55 km^{2}) Mexican land grant in the Salinas Valley, in present-day Monterey County, California. It was given in 1839 by Governor Juan B. Alvarado to Carlos Cayetano Espinoza.

The name means "the pool of the little bears". The grant extended along the west bank of the Salinas River south of present-day Greenfield.

== History ==
Jose Carlos Cayetano Espinosa (1815–1865) was the son of Salvador Maria Espinosa, grantee of Rancho Bolsa de las Escorpinas. Carlos Cayetano Espinosa received the four square league Rancho Posa de los Ositos in 1839, and married Josefa Maria Boronda (1826–) in 1842.

With the cession of California to the United States following the Mexican-American War, the 1848 Treaty of Guadalupe Hidalgo provided that the land grants would be honored. As required by the Land Act of 1851, a claim for Rancho Posa de los Ositos was filed with the Public Land Commission in 1853, and the grant was patented to Carlos Cayetano Espinoza in 1865.

William Dunphy bought Rancho Posa de Los Ositos. William M. Dunphy (1827–1892), born in Ireland, went to Texas in 1845, and then came to San Francisco in 1849. He had brief success in gold digging, and turned his attention to the cattle business. In 1852 Dunphy married Carmen Uvilla. He formed a partnership with Thomas Hildred, in 1855, that was to become one of the largest in ranching operations in the West. In 1881, he bought out the Hildred interest.

== See also ==
- Ranchos of Monterey County, California
