= Vlaho Bukovac =

Croatian painter and academic (1855 - 1922)

- Born: Biagio Faggioni; 4 July 1855; Cavtat, Dalmatia, Austrian Empire (modern Croatia)
- Died: 23 April 1922 (aged 66); Prague, Czechoslovakia (modern Czech Republic)
- Known for: Painting
- Notable work: Une fleur Natalie of Serbia; Curtain for Croatian National Theatre of Zagreb
- Spouse: Jelica Pitarević (m. 1892)
- Children: 4

Vlaho Bukovac (French: Blaise Bukovac; Italian: Biagio Faggioni; 4 July 1855 – 23 April 1922) was a Croatian painter and academic. His life and work were eclectic, for the artist pursued his career in a variety of locales and his style changed greatly over the course of that career. He is probably best known for his 1887 nude Une fleur (A Flower), which he created during his French period and which received attention in various reviews and publications during his lifetime. Bukovac was the court painter for Obrenović dynasty, Karađorđević dynasty and Petrović-Njegoš dynasty. In Zagreb, he is probably best known as the painter of the 1895 theatre curtain in the Croatian National Theatre.

== Biography ==
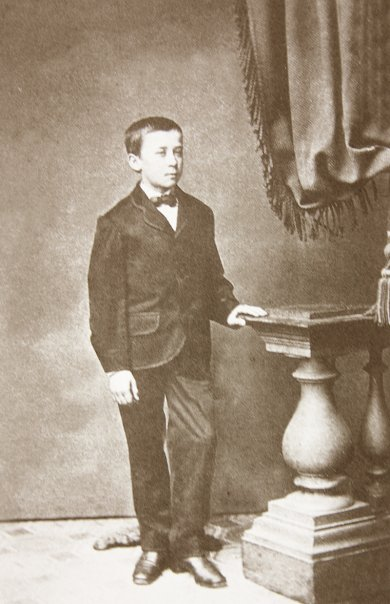
The young Biagio Faggioni

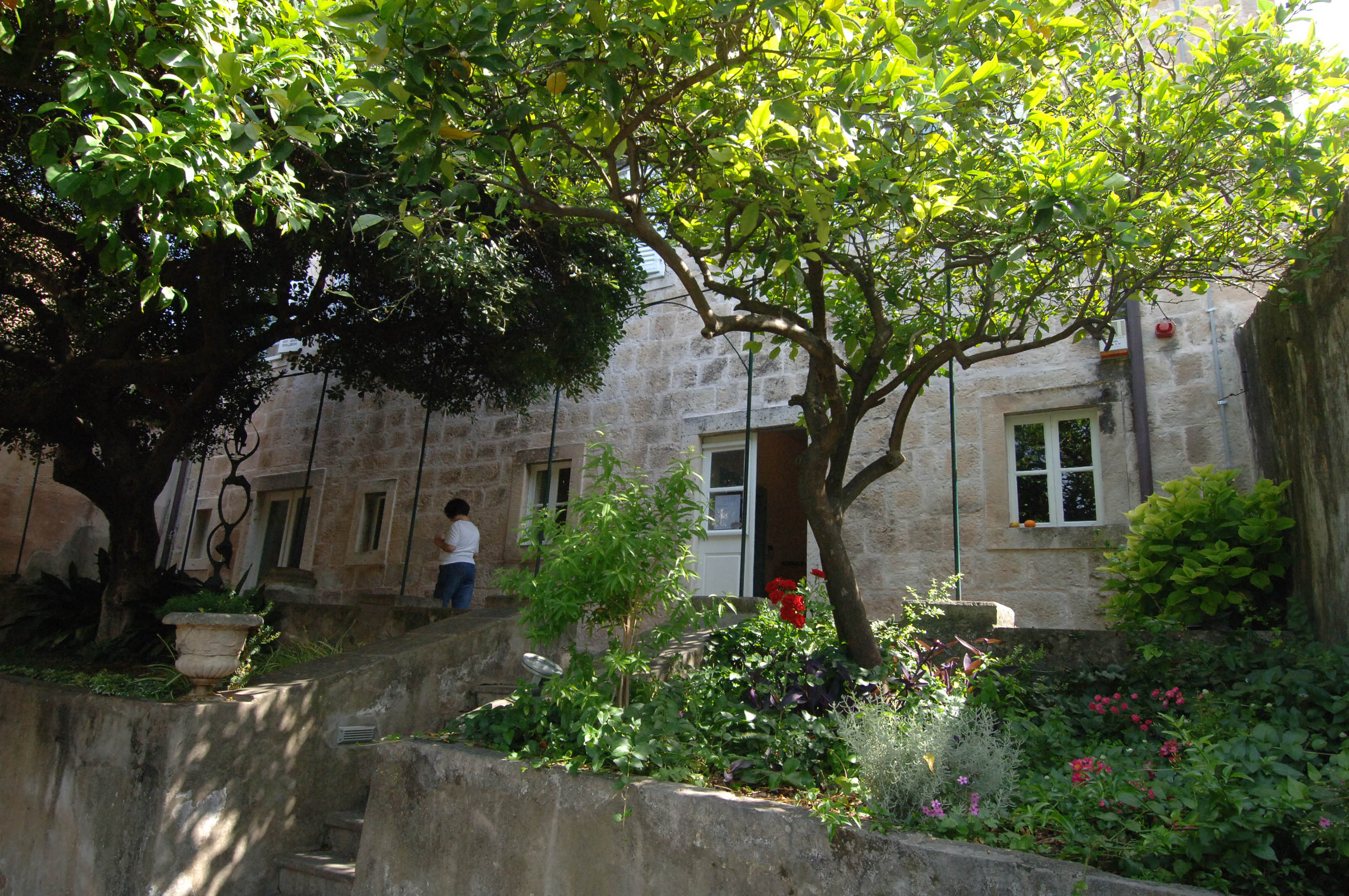
Bukovac's childhood home in Cavtat

Bukovac was born Biagio Faggioni in the town of Cavtat south of Dubrovnik in Dalmatia. While his mother was of Croatian descent, his paternal grandfather was an Italian sailor from the Genoa area who experienced a shipwreck near Cavtat. Like that he met a local girl Ana Kličan, Bukovac's grandmother, with whom he married and settled in Cavtat. When he was eleven, he left with his uncle Frano for New York, where he stayed for four years before returning to his parents. Soon after, he found employment as a sailor, traveling on the Istanbul-Liverpool-Odessa route, however, his nautical career was soon cut short due to injuries sustained during a fall on the ship. While recovering at home, he began to paint. In 1873 he and his brother Jozo left for Peru, where he lived for a year selling his paintings before moving to California in 1874.

In San Francisco, he began an amateur career in painting, and received his first lessons in art from Domenico Tojetti. He painted many portraits, including multiple for the family of wealthy businessman William Dunphy, owner of the Rancho Posa de los Ositos.

In 1877, Faggioni returned to Europe to study painting, and in this time began using the surname Bukovac, a translation of the Italian word faggio meaning beech. He received his artistic education in Paris where he was financially supported by patrons Josip Juraj Strossmayer and Medo Pucić. He became a student at the prestigious École des Beaux-Arts in Paris studying under the famed French artist Alexandre Cabanel. Dubrovnik-based Serb trader Petar Marić also assisted him financially, and Bukovac later painted a portrait of him and his family.

In 1892 he married Jelica Pitarević from Dubrovnik. They had one son and three daughters. He would become a correspondent member of the Czech Academy of Sciences, an honorary member of Yugoslav Academy of Sciences and Arts (JAZU) and also a member of Serbian Royal Academy. He died in Prague where he studied and taught art.

=== Early career ===
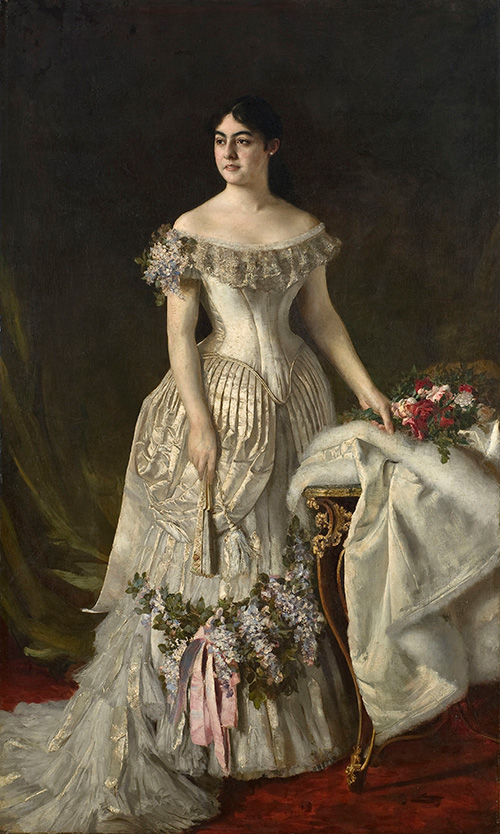
Portrait of Natalie of Serbia, 1882, part of the National Museum of Serbia collection

Bukovac began his career in France. He painted in a "sugary" realistic style, his fashionable paintings achieved great success at the Paris Salon. During his time in France, he often traveled to England and the Dalmatian coast, where he was born. From the mid-1880s to World War I, regularly visited England, where many of his pictures were sold by the London art dealers Vicars Brothers, including The White Slave in 1884. During his time in England, Bukovac gained the patronage of Samson Fox of Harrogate and Richard LeDoux of Liverpool, whose support would elevate him in British society and in the art scene. Samson Fox had bought Suffer the Little Children to Come to Me, exhibited at the Paris Salon in 1888, which was later presented to St. Robert's Church in Harrogate.

=== Courts of Serbia, Montenegro ===
Bukovac was the court painter for Serbian and later Yugoslav Obrenović dynasty and Karađorđević dynasty. For his portrait of Natalie of Serbia he was awarded Order of the Cross of Takovo. He was also awarded Order of St. Sava.

Bukovac visited Kingdom of Montenegro several times and painted member of the Petrović-Njegoš dynasty and other members of the elite. He was awarded Order of Prince Danilo I for his work.

Some of his painting are a part of the collection of Museum of Fine Arts of Montenegro.

=== Croatia and Prague ===
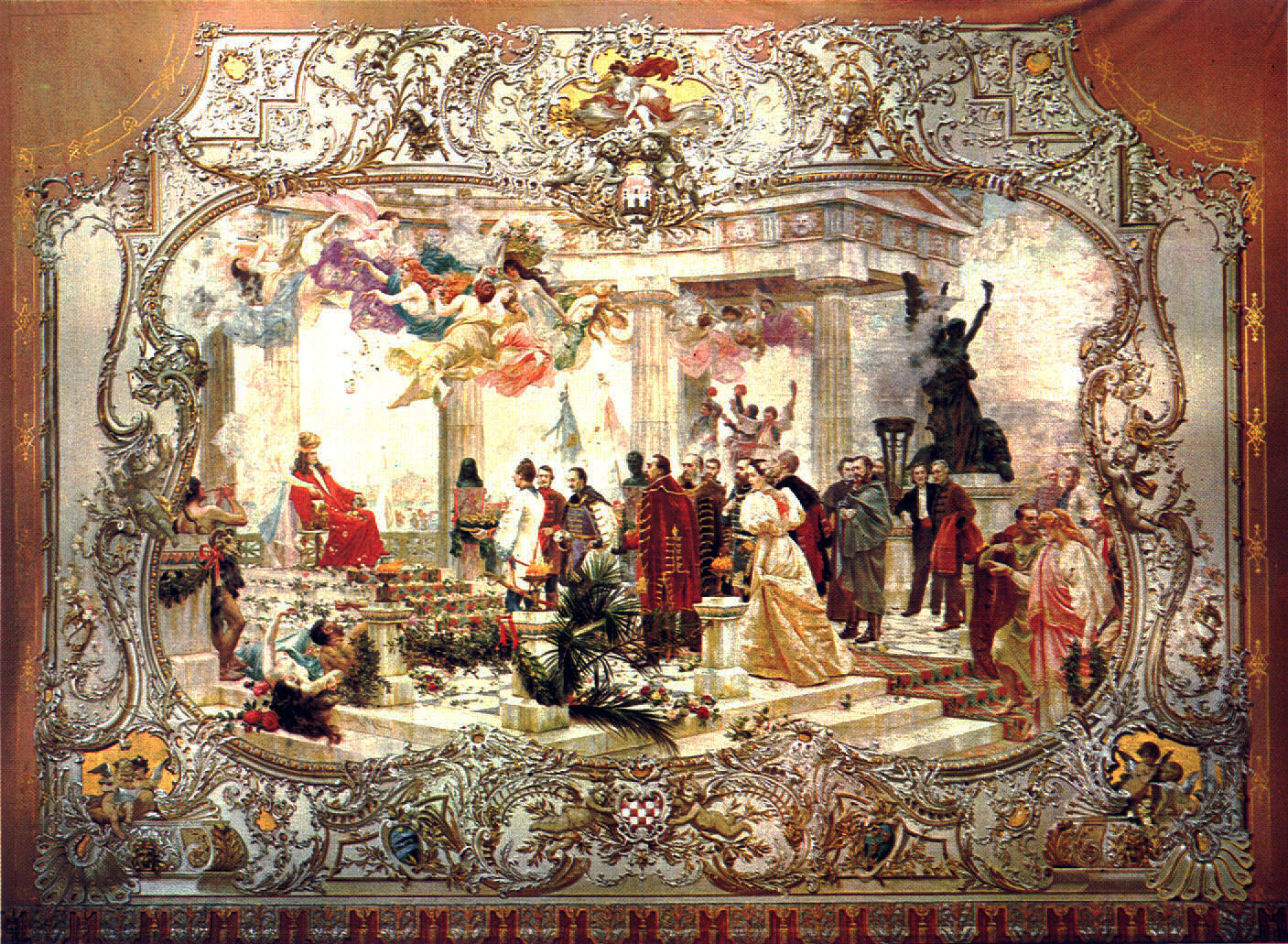
Hrvatski narodni preporod, Curtain at HNK in Zagreb

Bukovac became a significant representative of fine arts in Zagreb, Croatia from 1893–97, bringing with him the spirit of French art. These new directives are most evident in his landscapes. He then began using a palette of lively and lighter colors using liberated strokes, soft rendering and the introduction of light on the painting canvas. Several examples of his work are in the Golden Hall of the Hermann Bollé-built palace on Opatička Street (today the Croatian Institute of History), where Izidor Kršnjavi commissioned Croatian artists to paint historical scenes and allegorical compositions in high relief.

In 1895, Bukovac completed one of his best known works, the theatre curtain in the Croatian National Theatre, The Reformation of Croatian Literature and Art. In his time in Zagreb, he became a leader at many important cultural and artistic events. In December 1893, Bukovac and Izidor Kršnjavi opened an exhibition titled "Croatian Salon" (Hrvatski salon), displaying the works of many of the top Croatian artists of the time. A few years later, Bukovac had his residence and atelier built on King Tomislav Square, and in 1895 he founded and became the first president of the "Croatian Society of Artists" (Croatian: Društvo hrvatskih umjetnika). The organization's statute only allowed Croats who had successfully presented their collections at three different art exhibitions. Therefore the original members were well known artists: Oskar Alexander, Robert Auer, Ivo Bauer, Menci Clement Crnčić, Bela Čikoš, Robert Frangeš, Ferdo Kovačević, Viktor Kovačić, and Rudolf Valdec.

As president of the Croatian Society of Artists, he was among those who formerly opened the beautiful new Art Pavilion in Zagreb in December 1898. He gave a speech thanking the city council for building the pavilion on behalf of Croatian artists. During this time, he felt satisfaction and enthusiasm in Zagreb that he had not felt in a while. He dedicated much time and energy to his new students, one of which was noted Croatian painter Mirko Rački. However, due to controversy over the opening of the Croatian Salon, he withdrew to his native Cavtat where he stayed from 1898 to 1902.

In 1903 he moved to Prague, where he was appointed associate professor at the Academy of Fine Arts in Prague. He introduced pointillism to the Prague Academy, and earned his historical reputation as an excellent pedagogue.

In 1908 he was elected president of the Association of Croatian Artists "Medulić" in Split. From 1912–13, Bukovac painted "Development of Croatian Culture" (Razvitak Hrvatske Kulture) for the main reading room in the Croatian State Archives. In 1918, he published his autobiography "My Life" (Moj život) in Zagreb.

== Legacy ==
Besides being an artist who followed the established canons dictated by the salon and the general public, he followed his own inner impulses of artistic creation. Liberated artistic expression, which was called Impressionism, developed in the spirit of the artists who kept gathering in modernism-oriented marginal galleries in Paris in the 1870s. He knew the spirit of academia and, on the other hand, he felt the spirit of Impressionistic freedom. Having accepted modern principles, Bukovac painted casual pictures, using liberated strokes of the brush, in the pointillist technique.

His childhood home in Cavtat was made a museum called the Bukovac House, and is part of the Museums and Galleries of Konavle. The museum holds a wide collection of Bukovac’s works, from portraits and paintings during his days in Paris, Zagreb, Cavtat, and Prague.

In addition to artwork, the museum contains many of Bukovac's personal objects, sketches, private letters, photographs, and a manuscript of his autobiography "My life" published in 1918. Also, Bukovac's work can be found in the collection of Milan Jovanović Stojimirović who bequeathed a large number of paintings, sketches and artifacts to the Art Department of the Museum in Smederevo.

In 2006, Bukovac's painting Une fleur (identified as Reclining Nude by the auction house) sold at Bonhams in London for £100,800.

== Gallery ==
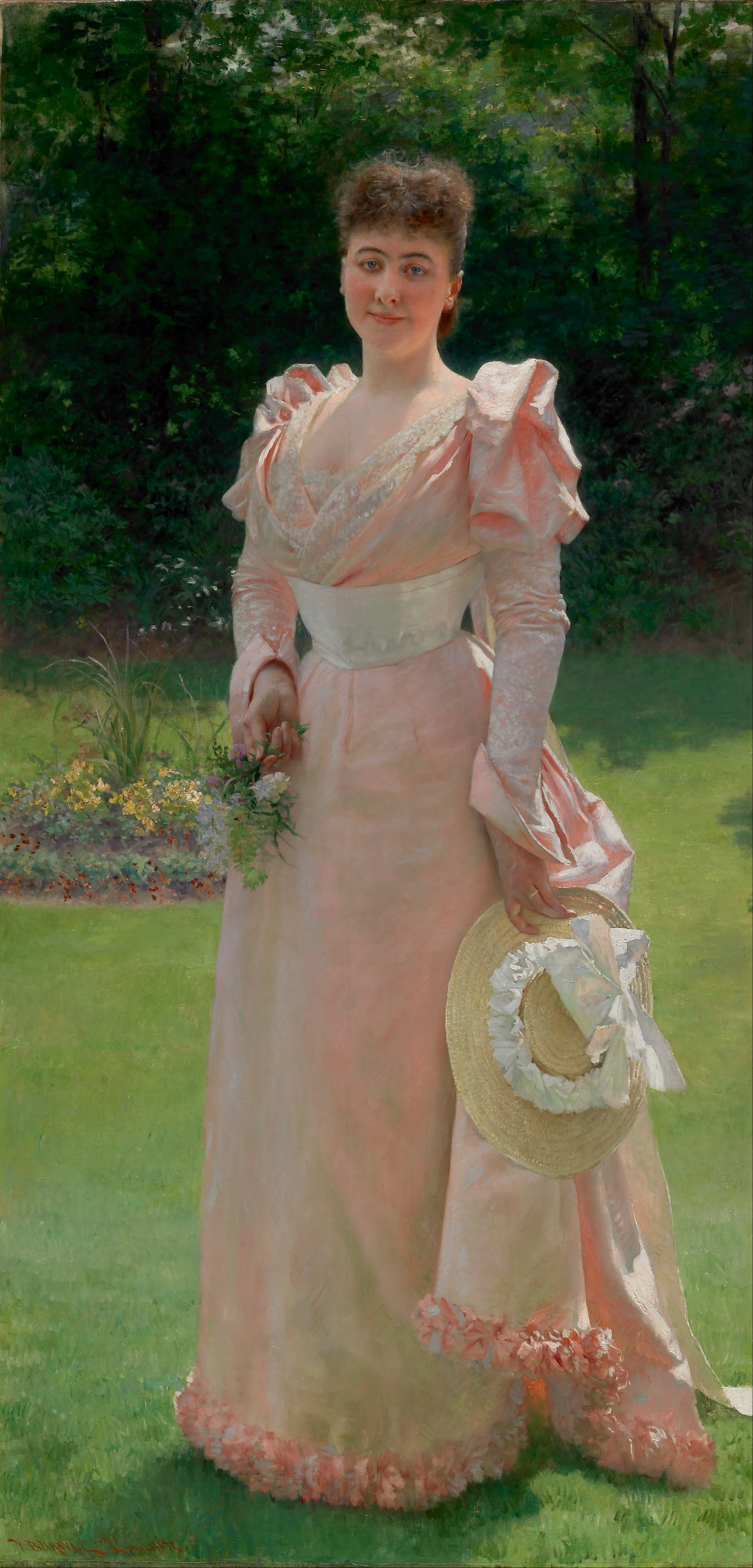
Mrs Richard Le Doux

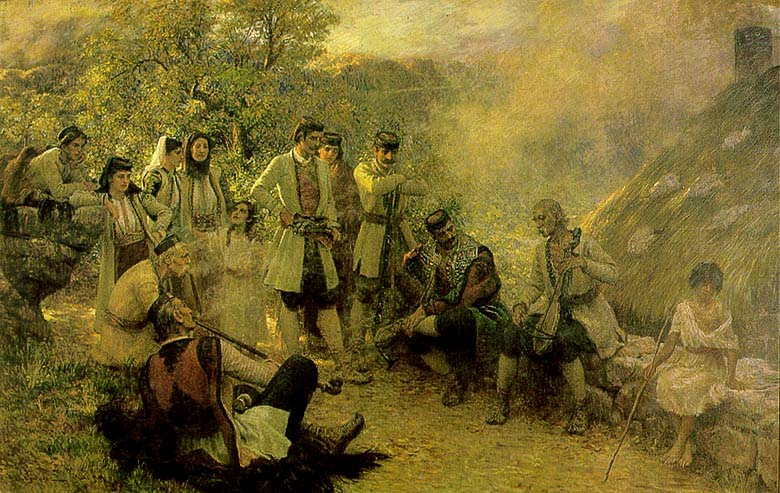
Minstrel

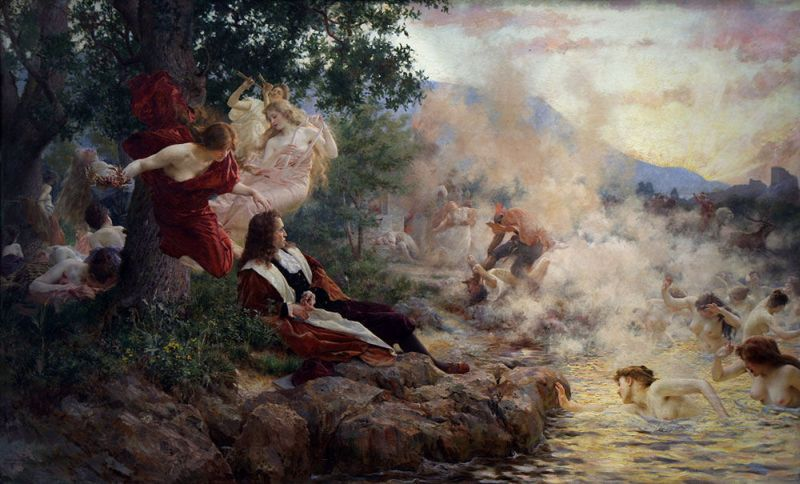
Gundulić's Dream (1894)

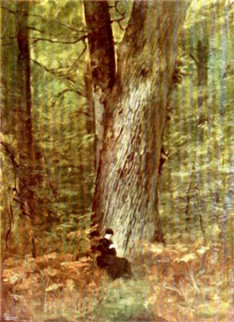
Deep in the Forest

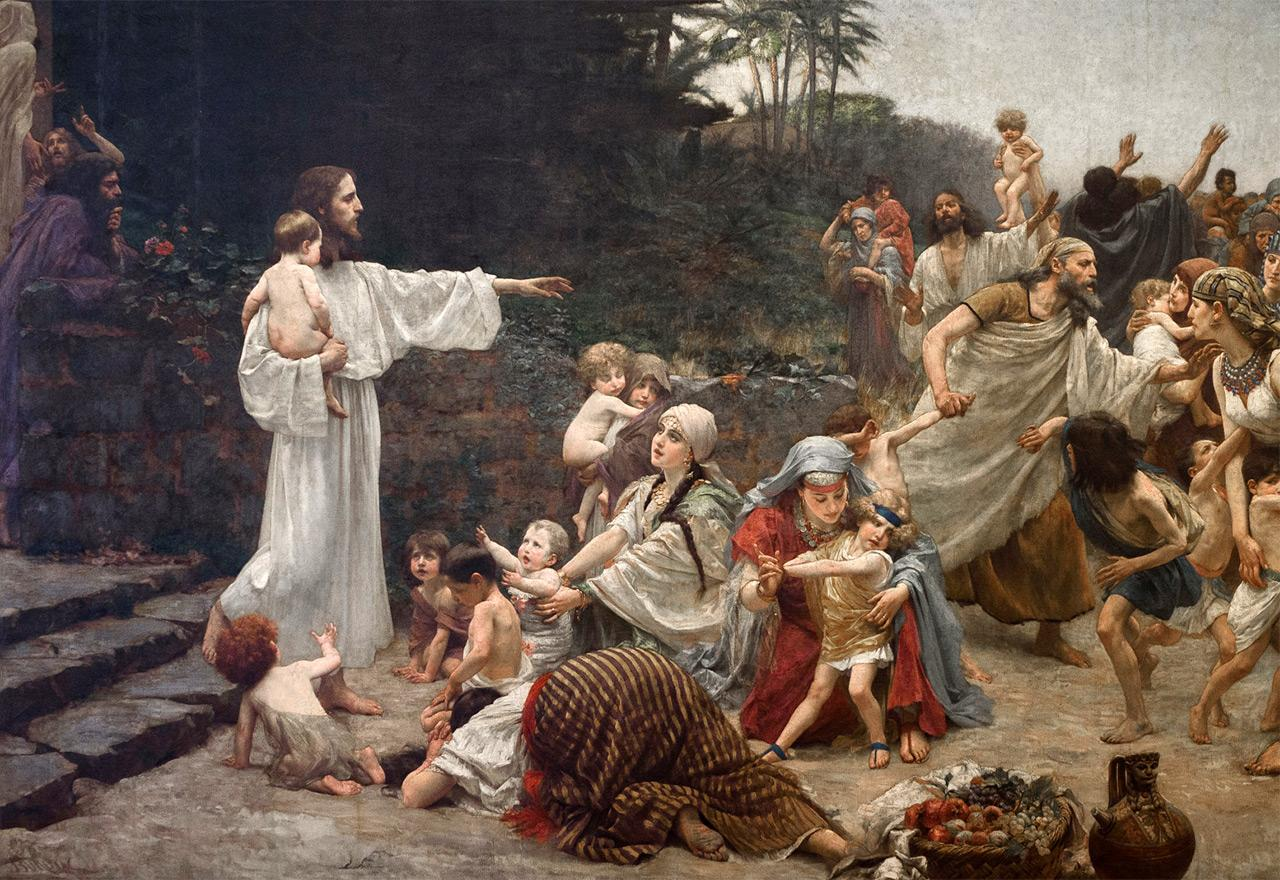
Jesus, Friend of the Children

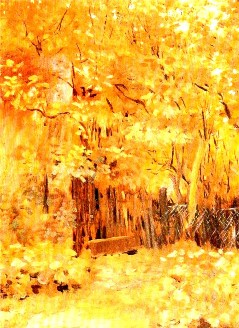
Autumn Landscape

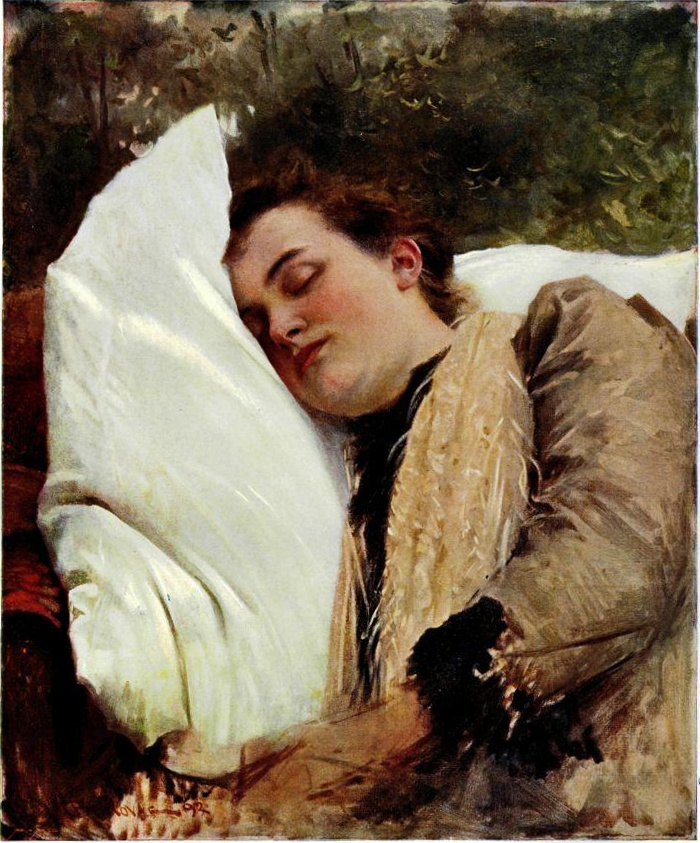
A Little Dream

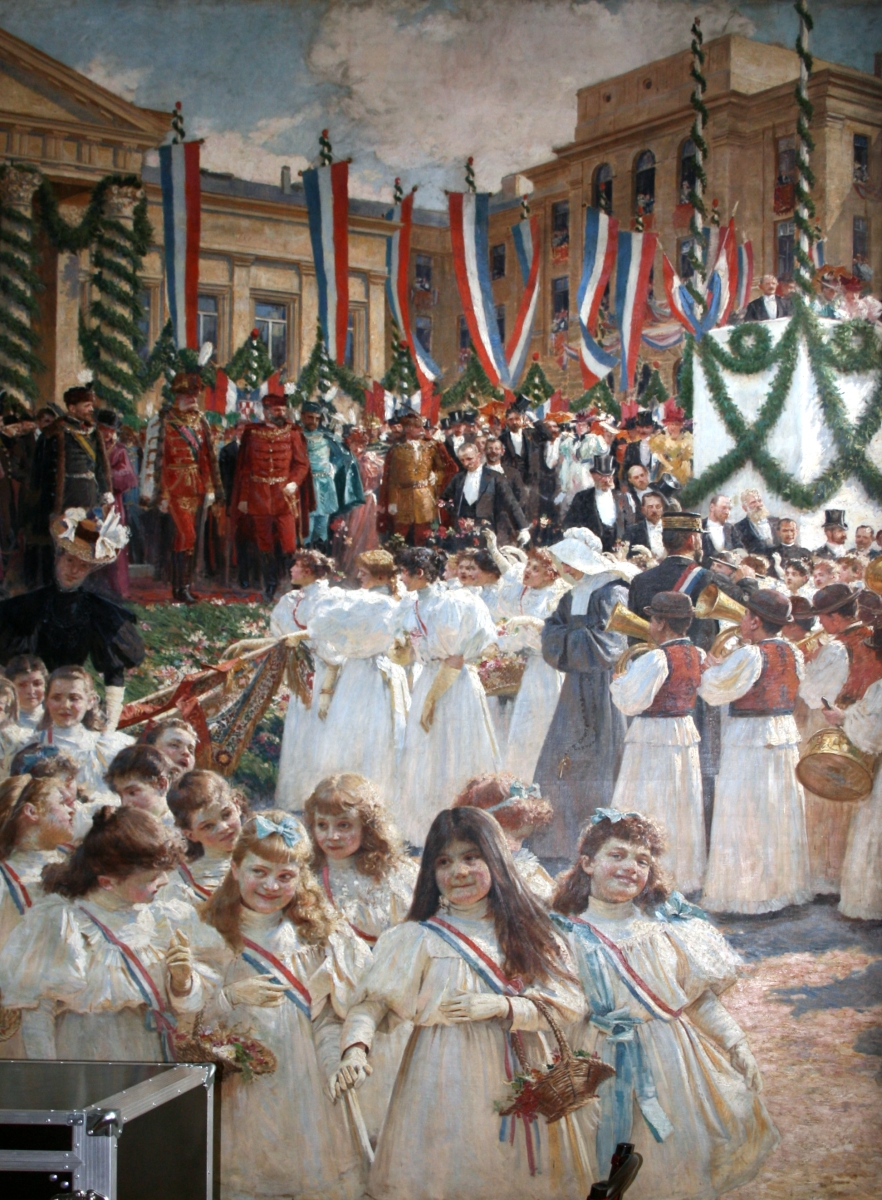
Long Live the King!

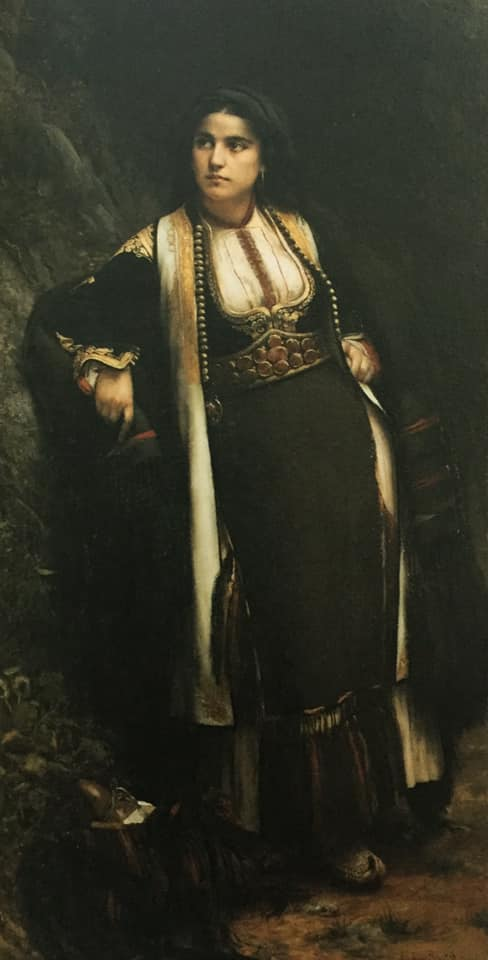
Montenegrin Woman

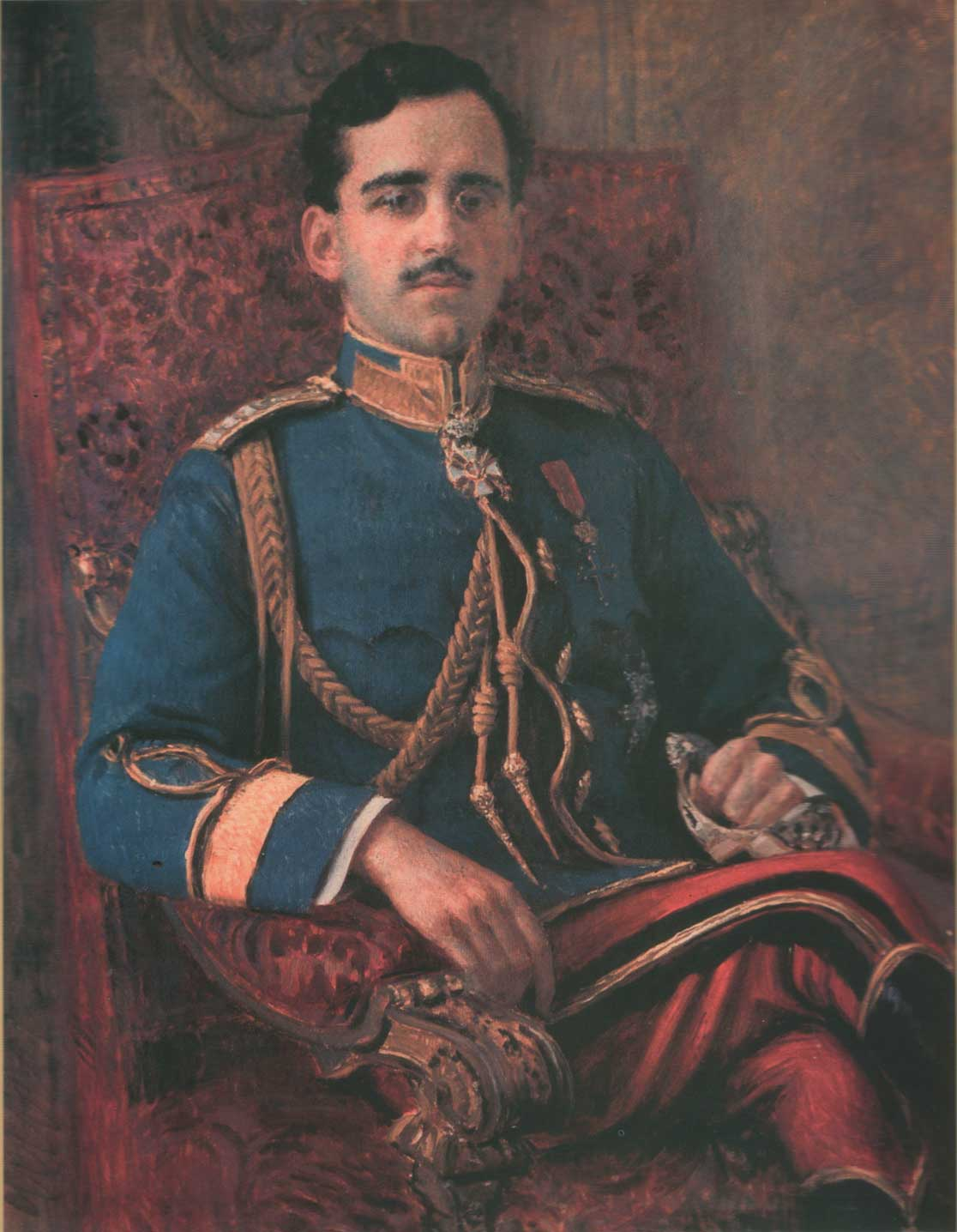
Alexander I of Yugoslavia

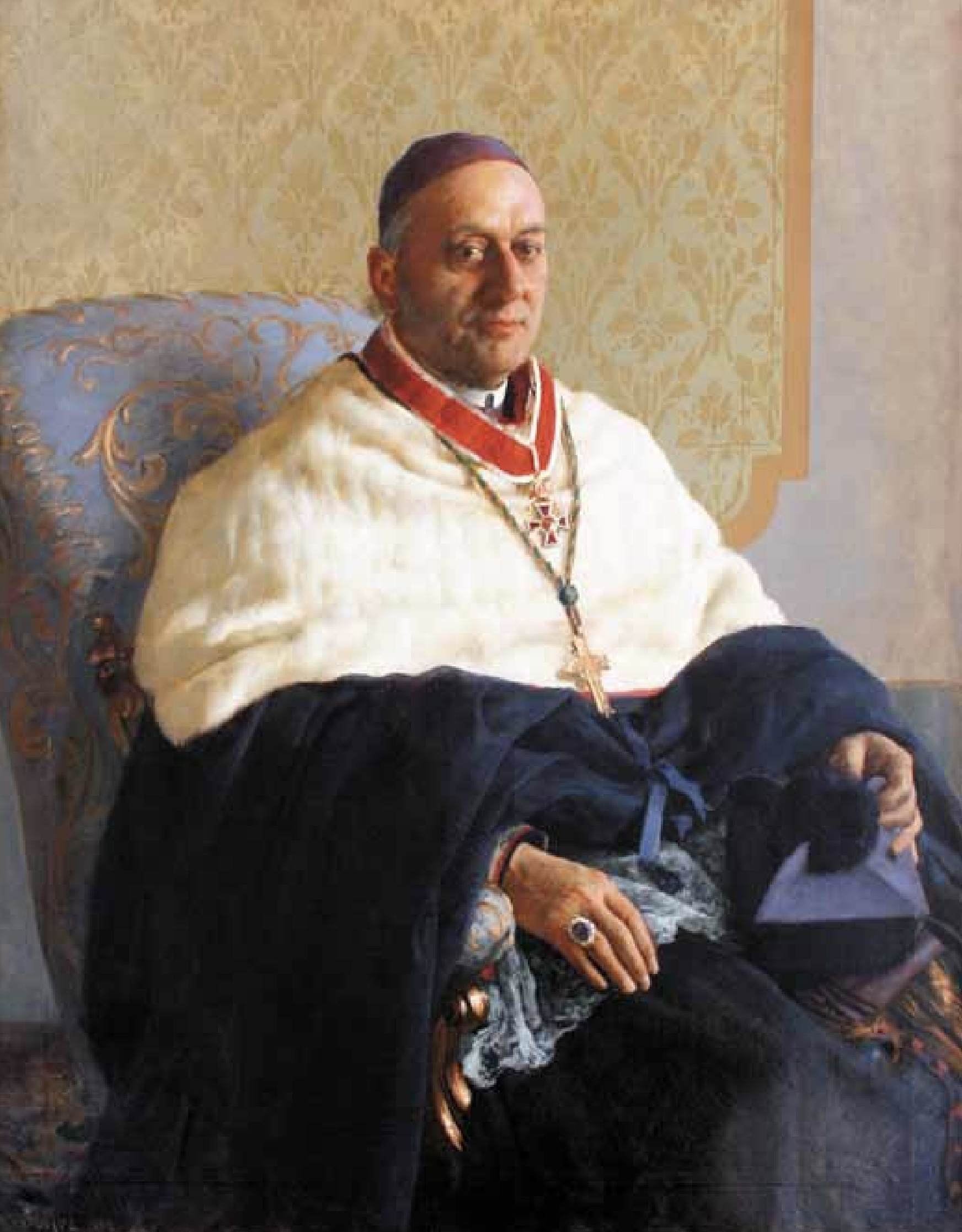
Portrait of Marko Kalogjera (1880)

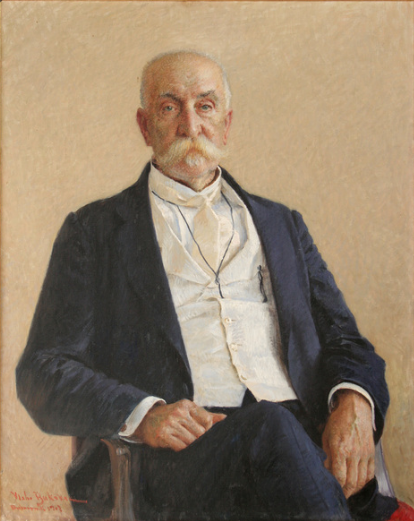
Portrait of mayor Pero Čingrija

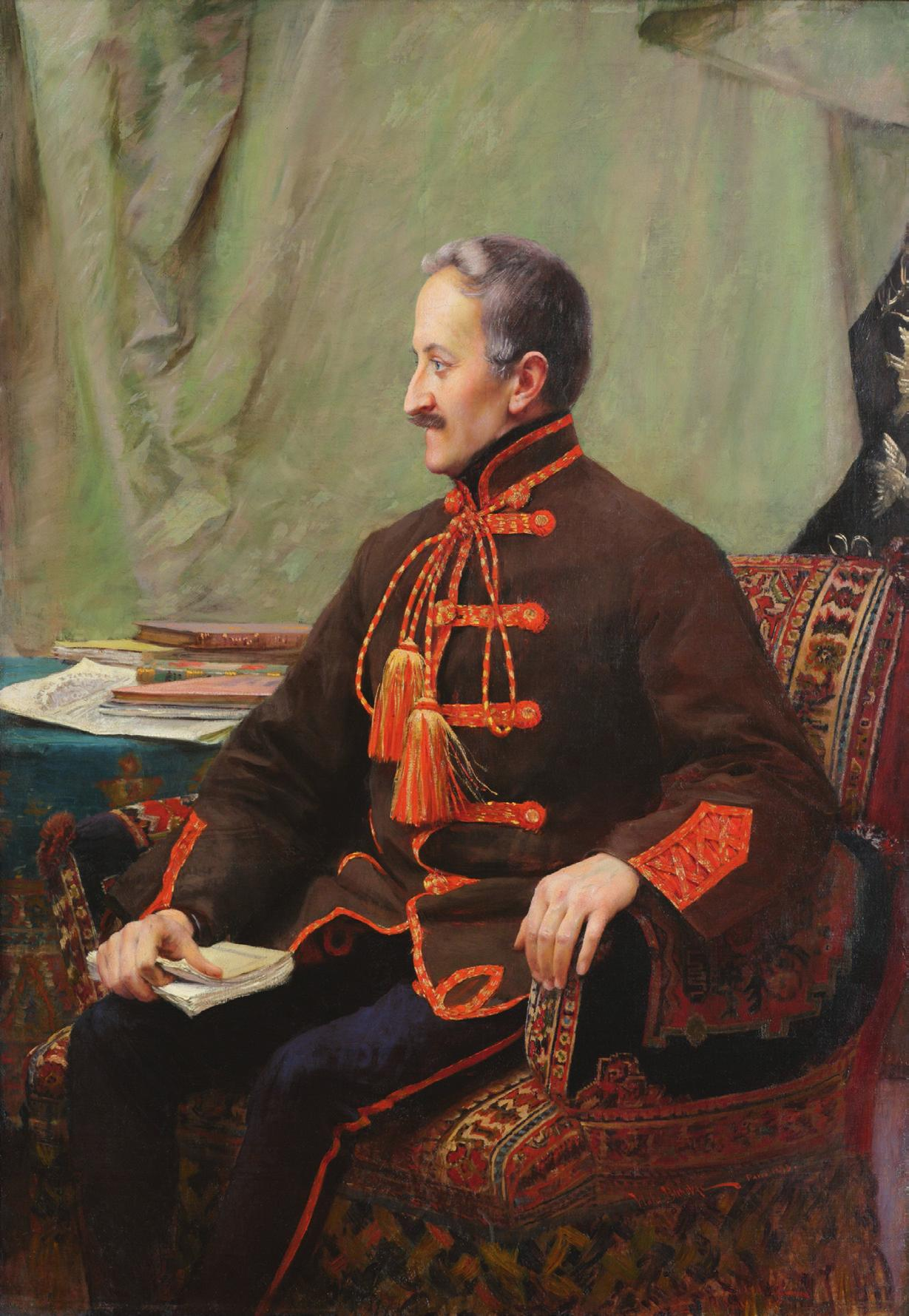
Portrait of Janko Drašković, 1908

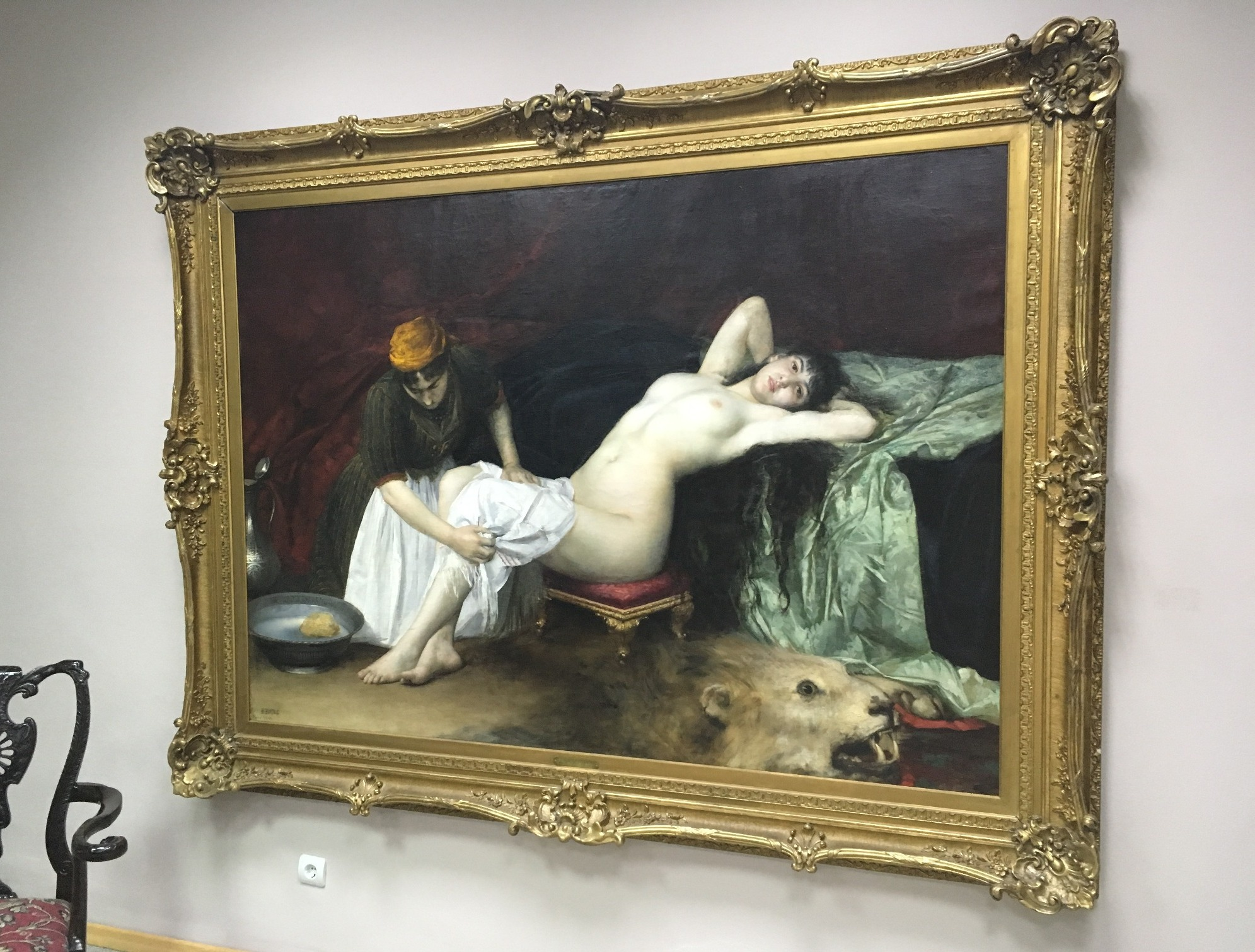
Velika Iza, Pavle Beljanski Memorial Collection

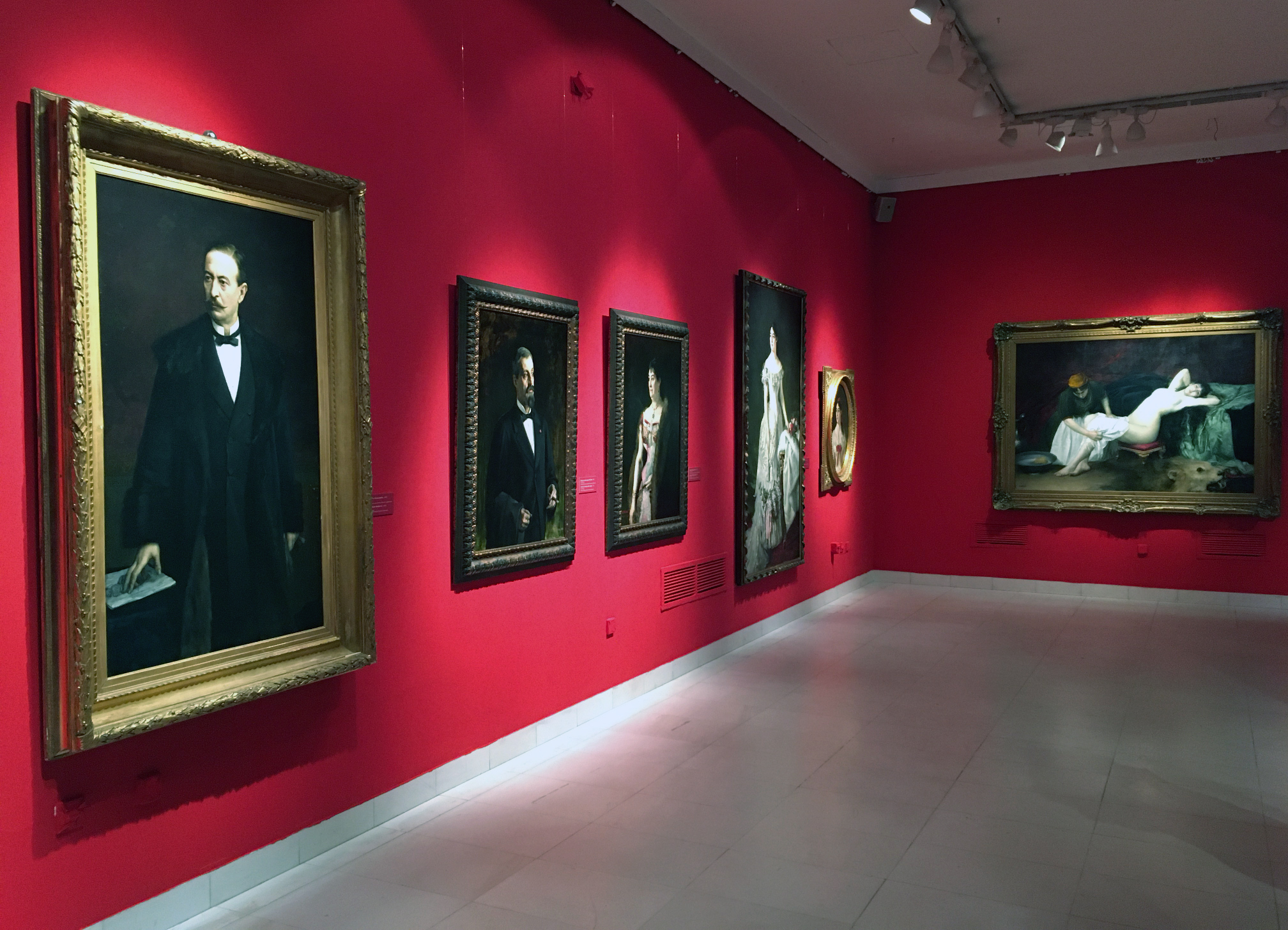
Exhibition "Vlaho Bukovac - painting of imperishable beauty" in the Gallery of the Serbian Academy of Arts and Sciences, 2020
