= Arroyo Seco (Salinas River tributary) =

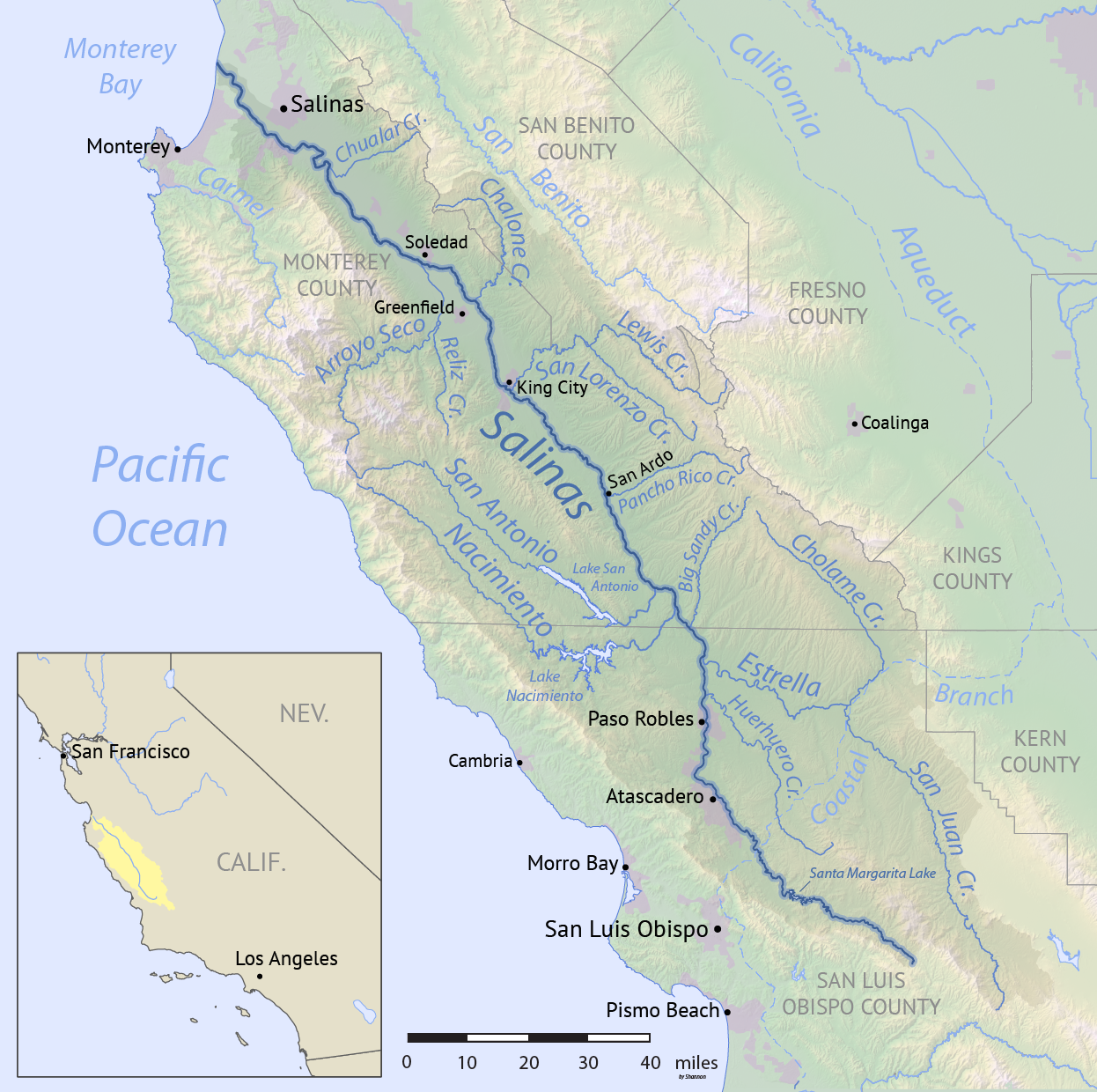
- Map of the Salinas River basin including the Arroyo Seco

Location
- Country: United States
- State: California

Physical characteristics
- Source: near Junipero Serra Peak
  - location: Ventana Wilderness, California Coast Ranges
  - coordinates: 36°07′52″N 121°26′57″W
  - elevation: 5,480 ft (1,670 m)
- Mouth: Salinas River
  - location: Greenfield, Monterey County
  - coordinates: 36°24′49″N 121°20′33″W
  - elevation: 164 ft (50 m)
- Length: 40 mi (64 km)
- Basin size: 275 sq mi (710 km^{2})
- Discharge
  - location: near Vaqueros Creek, 10 miles (16 km) from the mouth
  - average: 168 cu ft/s (4.8 m^{3}/s)
  - minimum: 0 cu ft/s (0 m^{3}/s)
  - maximum: 28,300 cu ft/s (800 m^{3}/s)

The Arroyo Seco ("dry stream") is a major tributary of the Salinas River in central California. About 40 miles (64 km) long, it drains a rugged area of the Coast Ranges east of Big Sur before flowing through the agricultural Salinas Valley.

== Name ==
"Arroyo Seco" means "dry stream" or "dry wash" in Spanish. The river probably got its name because it disappears into the ground more than 10 miles (16 km) above its mouth for most of the year, however, it reaches the Salinas during the rainy season. The river above the Salinas Valley is actually a fairly large perennial stream. The common name, Arroyo Seco River or Arroyo Seco Creek, is actually a tautology because the name contains two mentions of "watercourse", thus "Arroyo Seco River" literally translates to "dry streambed river".

== Course ==
The river rises in several unnamed forks in the Santa Lucia Mountains of the Coast Ranges near the Pacific Ocean. It flows generally north, cutting into a steep gorge, receiving Lost Valley Creek and Tassajara Creek both from the left. After the confluence with Rocky Creek, the Arroyo Seco swings abruptly east, passing a pair of intermittent natural lakes simply known as "The Lakes". Here, the valley begins to widen and the stream lazes out onto a shallower, sandier bed, passing the unincorporated communities of Millers Ranch and Sycamore Flat. Another major tributary, Piney Creek, enters just downstream of the former.

Meandering east between low bluffs, the river receives Vaqueros Creek and Reliz Creek from the right, emerging from the mountains about 3 miles (4.8 km) southwest of Greenfield. The river flows north into the Salinas Valley, where much of its water is diverted for irrigation. Turning northwest, it begins to parallel U.S. Highway 101 as a seasonally dry wash. It joins the Salinas just south of the city of Soledad. The source, mouth and entire course of the river are entirely within Monterey County. There are no dams on the Arroyo Seco, making it prone to flash flooding.

== Watershed ==
Draining 275 square miles (710 km^{2}), the Arroyo Seco River is the last major tributary of the Salinas River that enters before it reaches the Pacific. Most of the watershed lies in the rugged coastal range areas southwest of Greenfield and Soledad, and the drainage divide runs along the crest of the Santa Lucia Mountains to the west and the lower Sierra de Salinas to the northeast. Although the mountains are not particularly high, with the highest point just 5,853 feet (1,784 m) above sea level at Junipero Serra Peak, most of the basin nonetheless has great topographical relief, dissected by numerous canyons and ridges. Watersheds bordering the Arroyo Seco drainage are those of the Carmel River and Big Sur River to the northwest, multiple small creeks flowing into the Pacific on the west, the San Antonio River to the south, and other smaller tributaries of the Salinas on the east.

== Ecology ==
Because of its relatively pristine condition, the Arroyo Seco River in the foothills and mountains supports a rich riparian zone habitat that is home to such sensitive species as the southwestern pond turtle and California spotted owl. The only perennial Salinas River tributary without dams, the river also supports a respectable run of steelhead trout, one of the last remnant populations along the Central California coast. Tributaries such as Tassajara Creek, Church Creek and Roosevelt Creek also maintain sizable populations of steelhead. The Arroyo Seco is considered a potential candidate for inclusion in the National Wild and Scenic Rivers system.

== See also ==
- List of rivers of California
