= Santa Rita, Salinas, California =

Santa Rita
- Neighborhood of Salinas
- Location in California
- Coordinates: 36°43′26″N 121°39′22″W
- Country: United States
- State: California
- County: Monterey County
- City: Salinas
- Elevation: 79 ft (24 m)

Santa Rita (Spanish for "Saint Rita") is a neighborhood of Salinas, California, in Monterey County. It is located north of Downtown Salinas, at an elevation of 79 feet (24 m).

== History ==
Jose Manuel Soto bought the Santa Rita land grant and allocated 1 square mile (2.6 km^{2}) for a town he named New Republic. The New Republic post office opened in 1870 and changed its name to Santa Rita in 1874, and closed permanently in 1907. The town was also called Pinecate from nearby Pinecate Peak, and Sotoville in honor of Soto. It was formerly known as "New Republic", "Sotoville", and "Pinecate".

Santa Rita was annexed by Salinas in 1975. The Zip Code in Santa Rita is 93906.
