= Une fleur =

Painting by Vlaho Bukovac

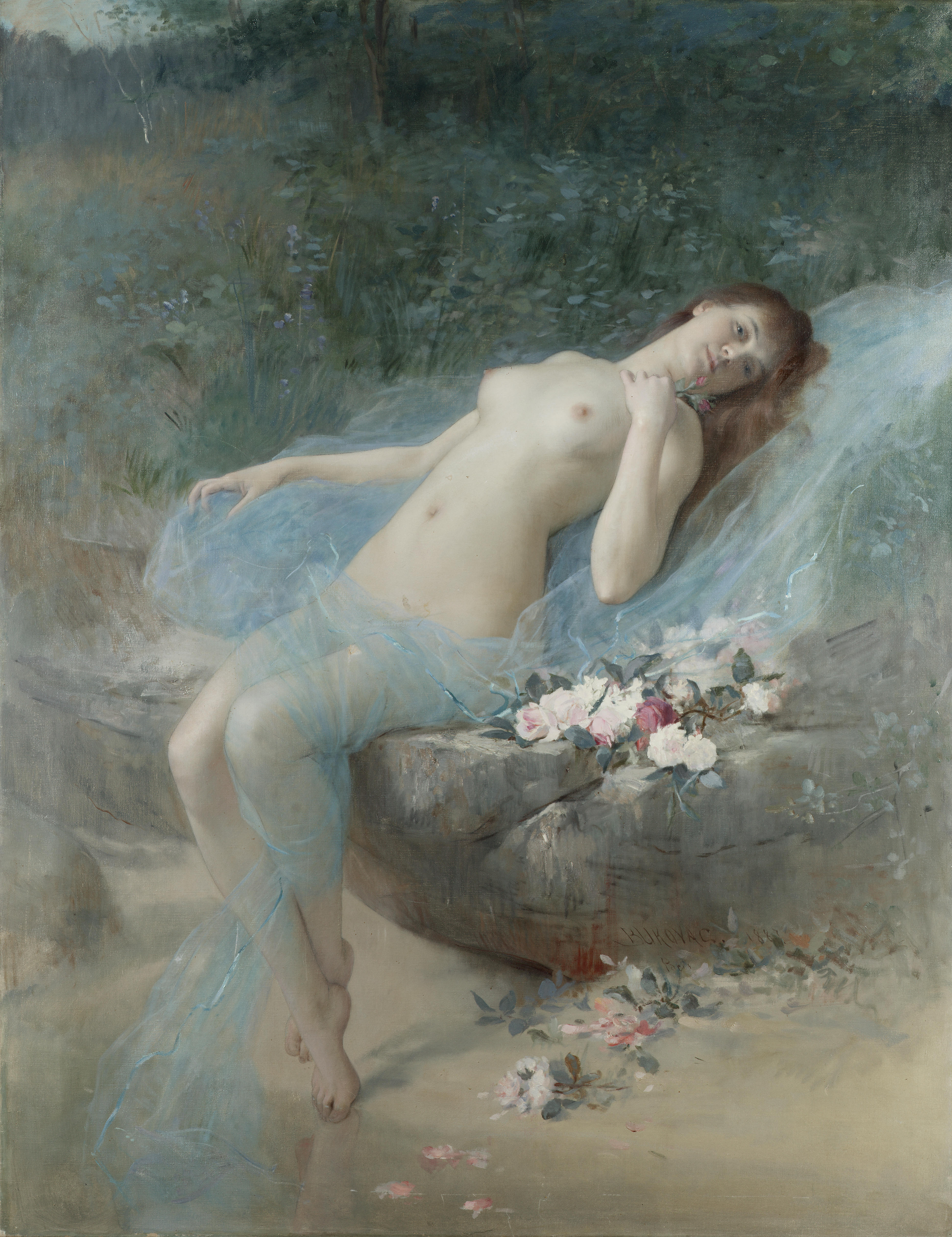
- Artist: Vlaho Bukovac
- Year: 1887
- Medium: Oil on canvas
- Dimensions: 127 cm × 97 cm (50 in × 38 in)
- Location: Private collection

Une fleur (lit. 'A Flower') is a female nude painted in 1887 by the Croatian artist Vlaho Bukovac, which he created during his French period and that received attention in various publications during his lifetime.

This Symbolist painting in pastel blues and pale flesh tones depicts a beautiful female nude reclining next to an assortment of flowers and holding to her lips a small spray of two rosebuds. The obvious meaning is that she is the flower referred to in the painting's title, with all of the attendant implications of blossoming and sexual awakening.

The painting is currently held in private collection after it was sold at the London's Bonhams auction house for £100,800 to an unknown collector.
