= Rancho Los Gatos or Santa Rita =

Mexican land grant in present-day California

Coordinates: 36.720°N 121.680°W

Rancho Los Gatos or Santa Rita was a 4,424-acre (17.90 km^{2}) Mexican land grant in present-day Monterey County, California given in 1837 by Governor Juan B. Alvarado to José Trinidad Espinoza. The grant was northwest of present-day Salinas, bounded on the north by Espinosa Lake and Rancho Bolsa de las Escorpinas of his brother Salvador Espinoza, and encompassed present-day Santa Rita.

== History ==
Jose Trinidad Espinoza (1794–1854), the son of Jose Cayetano Espinosa and Maria Rosa Tapia, married Maria Jacinta Archuleta (1796–) in 1815. Espinoza was granted the one square league Rancho Los Gatos in 1837. His daughter, Fermina Espinoza, married Domingo Perez (1809–).

With the cession of California to the United States following the Mexican-American War, the 1848 Treaty of Guadalupe Hidalgo provided that the land grants would be honored. As required by the Land Act of 1851, a claim for Rancho Los Gatos or Santa Rita was filed with the Public Land Commission in 1853, and the grant was patented to Fermina Espinoza de Perez and Domingo Perez in 1870.

Jose Manuel Soto (1832–), born in Peru, came to California in 1849. Soto married Maria Perez. Jose Manuel Soto established a town (known as Penacart, New Republic, Sotoville, and finally as Santa Rita) on part of Rancho Santa Rita in 1867.
