= Salinas River (California) =

River in California, United States

Salinas River Rio del Monterey, Rio San Antonio, Rio San Elizario, Rio Santa Delfina
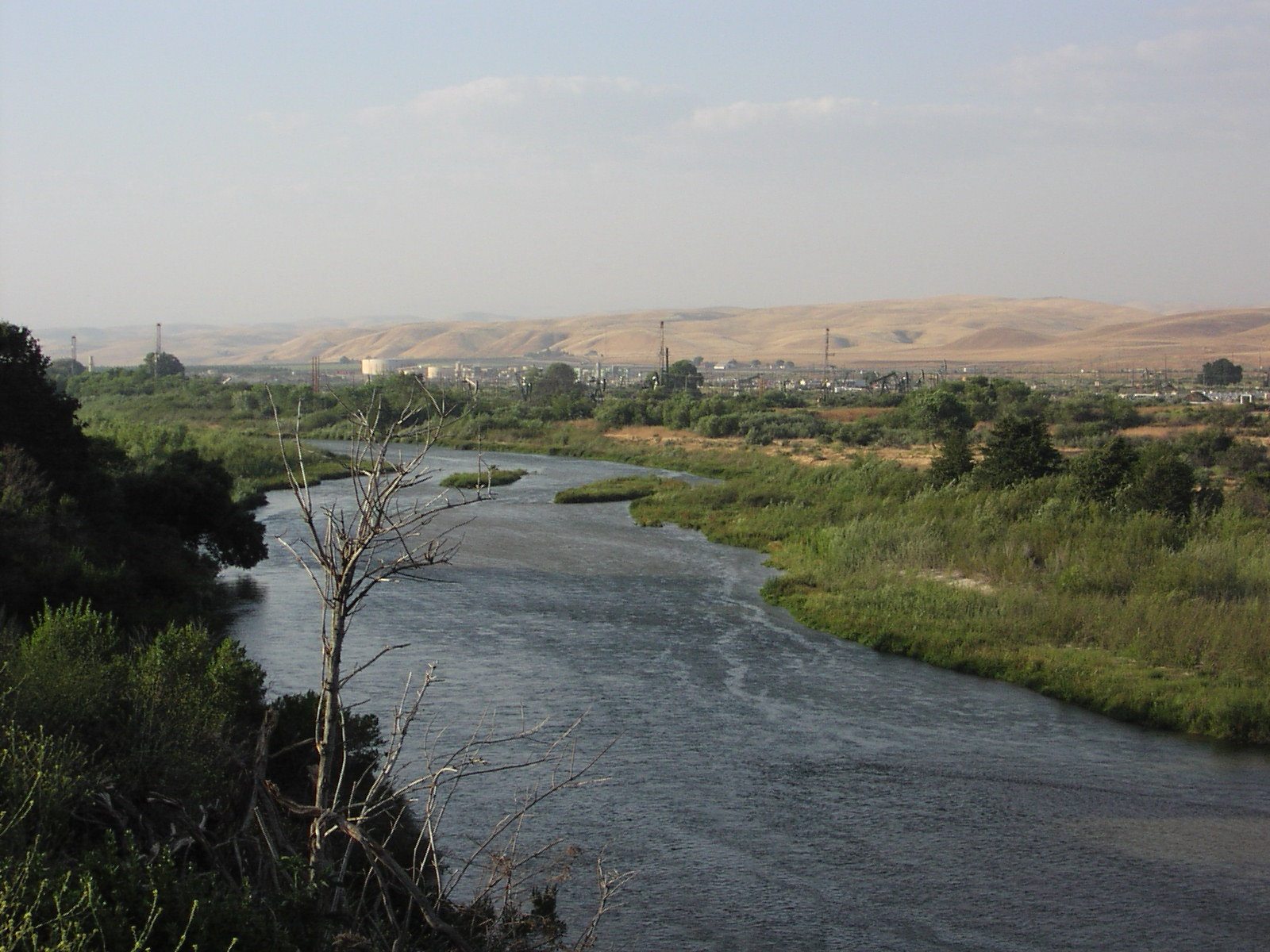
- View of the Salinas River near San Ardo in May 2008. During the rainier winter months, the river may occasionally reconnect with Monterey Bay. The San Ardo Oil Field is visible in the distance.

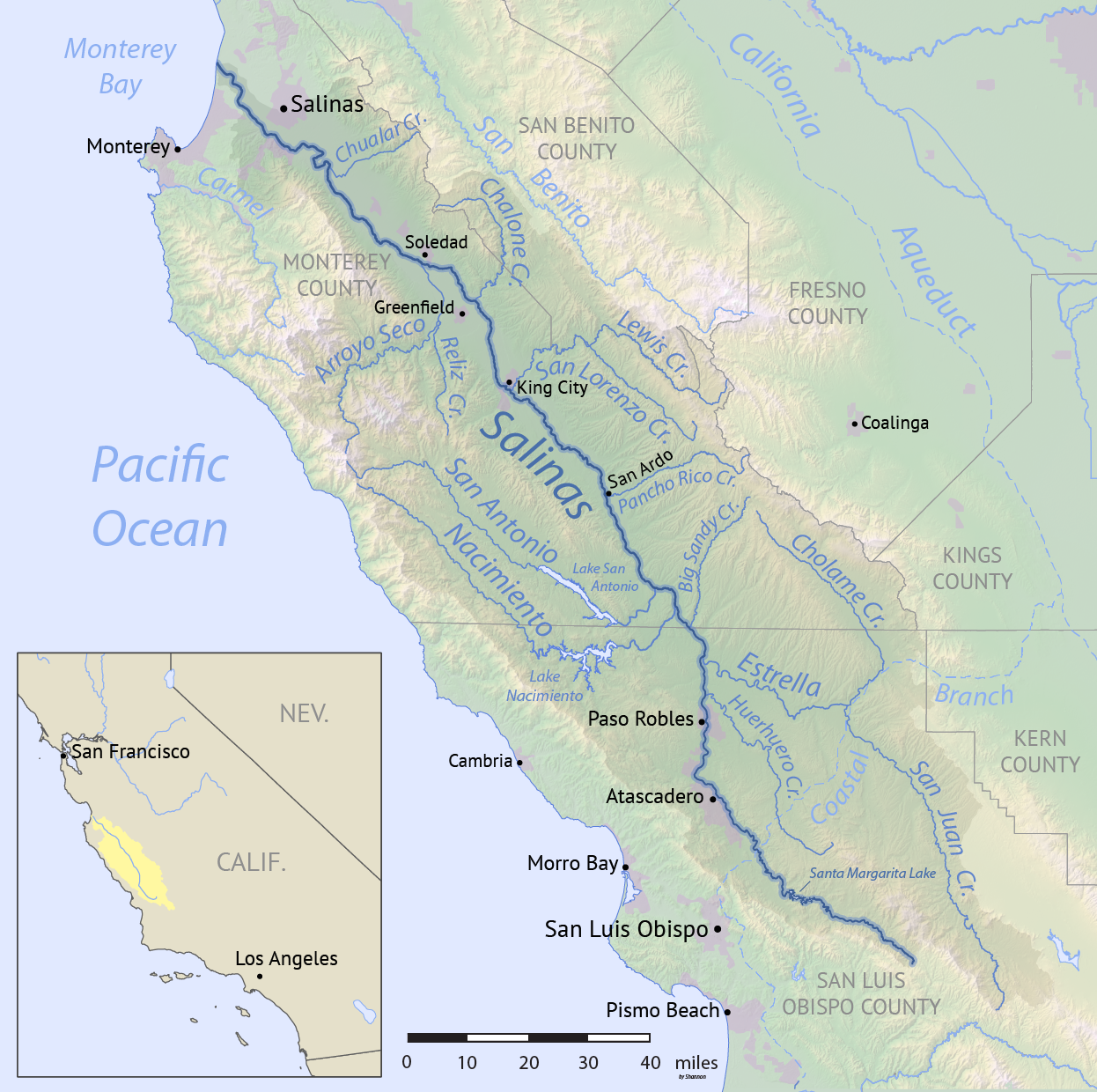
- Map of the Salinas River watershed
- Native name: ua kot taiauačorx (Southern Ohlone)

Location
- Country: United States
- State: California
- Cities and towns: Paso Robles, Soledad, Salinas

Physical characteristics
- Source: Los Machos Hills in the Los Padres National Forest
  - location: San Luis Obispo County, California
  - coordinates: 35°12′57.2394″N 120°13′26.112″W
  - elevation: 2,150 ft (660 m)
- Mouth: Monterey Bay
  - location: 6 miles north of Marina, California
  - coordinates: 36°44′58″N 121°48′13″W
  - elevation: 0 ft (0 m)
- Length: 175 mi (282 km)
- Basin size: 4,160 sq mi (10,800 km^{2})
- Discharge
  - location: near Spreckels
  - average: 421 cu ft/s (11.9 m^{3}/s)
  - minimum: 0 cu ft/s (0 m^{3}/s)
  - maximum: 95,000 cu ft/s (2,700 m^{3}/s)

Basin features
- Tributaries
  - left: Nacimiento River, San Antonio River, Arroyo Seco
  - right: Estrella River, San Lorenzo Creek

The Salinas River (Rumsen: ua kot taiauačorx) is the longest river of the Central Coast region of California, running 175 miles (282 km) and draining 4,160 square miles (10,800 km^{2}). It flows north-northwest and drains the Salinas Valley that slices through the central California Coast Ranges south of Monterey Bay. The river begins in southern San Luis Obispo County, originating in the Los Machos Hills of the Los Padres National Forest. From there, the river flows north into Monterey County, eventually making its way to connect with the Monterey Bay, part of the Pacific Ocean, approximately 5 miles (8.0 km) south of Moss Landing. The river is a wildlife corridor, and provides the principal source of water from its reservoirs and tributaries for the farms and vineyards of the valley.

== Hydrology ==
In 1769, when the river was first discovered by non-Native peoples via the Portola expedition, it was reported by them as being a "river watering a luxuriant plain" filled with fish weighing 8 to 10 pounds (3.6 to 4.5 kg). As of the end of 2016, the river had been transformed into little more than a dry bedded run-off feature for the majority of its length.

Until 1989 the Salinas River had a continuous flow throughout the year, stretching back to at least 1941 when the United States Geological Survey (USGS) began complete monitoring records in the Salinas area. Most probably primarily due to recent increases in agricultural water demand in the Salinas Valley, and the resultant lowering of water tables, the lower reaches of the Salinas river (north of King City) remained entirely dry during the three years 2013–2016.

Nonetheless, with sufficiently heavy rains, and on rare occasions, this now normally dry runoff feature is still capable of quickly transforming itself back into a fast-flowing river. In rainfall-induced flood conditions, it can at times measure over a mile in width. During the 20th century, such flood conditions are reported to have generally occurred approximately once every 3–10 years. The last similar flooding event along the river was reported in 1998.

The atypical drought-breaking rains of the winter of 2016–2017 restored the river's flow to its lower northern reaches in January 2017.

The current most typical dry or zero flow state of the majority of the river may be more the result of human activity than of any recent changes in weather patterns. Rainfall patterns of recent years in the Salinas area have not significantly changed from historical average rainfall patterns; the 139-year average annual rainfall in Salinas is 13.26 inches (337 mm) per year, and the average annual rainfall since 2000 is 11.01 inches (280 mm) per year. Recent increases in water use, primarily in the agricultural sector, and the damming of the river and its tributaries may be contributing factors causing the now mostly-dry condition of the riverbed.

The Monterey County Water Resources Agency currently operates a water use monitoring program which requires that all agricultural water users self-report annually on the estimated amount of groundwater pumped from the shrinking Salinas Valley aquifer. This is in contrast to some areas of the country where various water authorities both monitor and regulate water use for agriculture.

The river ecosystem, which once included steelhead trout and numerous other species throughout the watercourse, has been drastically impacted in recent years by both the increasingly heavy demand for agricultural water in the Salinas Valley and the resulting dry river conditions.

Despite regularly running dry, the Salinas River has had occasional notable floods, including in 1964 and 1995.

== History ==
=== Hypothesized geological history ===
The geological history of the ancient Salinas River is currently held by tectonic plate theory to likely be rather unique among the many rivers of the western North American seaboard: The shifting position of the raised section of the Pacific Plate that the river flows through was in ancient times aligned with the North American Plate at a point far south of its present location.

The discovery of the Monterey Canyon, the remarkably deep submarine canyon extending into the Pacific from the mouth of the Salinas River, is the basis for the proposal of what is presently thought to be the most probable geological history of the Salinas River.

The long and deep submarine Monterey Canyon dwarfs all other such canyons along the Pacific coast of North America. However, the known flow-rates and drainage area of the Salinas River in no way indicate the river as it presently stands was ever capable of creating such a large submarine outflow canyon. The current hypothesis is that, at one point in the Miocene epoch, many millions of years ago, the river was probably located in the vicinity of what is now Los Angeles County, having been carried north to its present position due to tectonic plate drift at the same rate as currently. When the ancient Salinas river was in that southern location, it may have served as the mouth of a river that drained the catchment of the Colorado River, that currently flows from the Rocky Mountains into the Sea of Cortez in western Mexico.

The Salinas River is also thought to have been, about 700,000 years ago, the outlet for prehistoric Lake Corcoran. Lake Corcoran once filled much of what is now California's Central Valley, prior to the lake's developing an outlet via the Carquinez Strait, to empty through the present San Francisco Bay.

=== Prehistory ===
People first appeared along the California coast approximately 13,000 years ago, during the latter part of the Pleistocene epoch.

Up until European settlement in Alta California, the indigenous people who lived along the Salinas River were the Rumsen in the northern Salinas Valley, and the Salinan in the southern Salinas Valley. The Chalon and Esselen peoples also lived in the general vicinity of the Salinas River.

=== Mission and Rancho eras ===
The Salinas river was first sighted by European settlers on 27 September 1769. This first European contact with the river was recorded by the Spanish "colonizing expedition" of Gaspar de Portolà. As was the practice of the Spanish government in the New World at the time, soldiers and priests were then typically sent out together on such colonizing expeditions.

The Portolá expedition included Franciscan priests, who soon thereafter established two missions along the banks of the Salinas river (then referred to as el Rio de Monterey.) The new missions built along the banks of the Salinas river were the Mission Nuestra Señora de la Soledad established in 1791, and the Mission San Miguel Arcángel, established in 1797.

The Mission San Antonio de Padua was established during this same time period in the Salinas Valley, but not on the river itself. These three missions were a part of the chain of 21 missions, then commissioned by the Spanish government in Alta California, now the U.S. State of California. All three of the Salinas Valley missions remain intact to this day, the Soledad mission having evolved into the City of Soledad, and the San Miguel mission having evolved into the unincorporated village of San Miguel. The San Antonio mission is now embedded in Fort Hunter Liggett (a U.S. Army garrison).

The mission period ended with the Mexican revolution and the replacement of missions with ranchos in the 1820s and 30s. Ranchos around the Salinas river included Rancho Las Salinas, Rancho Bolsa Nueva y Moro Cojo

=== American rule ===
1877 map of Monterey county showing the Salinas River and many of the ranchos along it. Note the pre-1908/10 mouth of the river at Moss Landing.

The Rancho period ended with the 1848 American seizure of California from Mexico. The City of Monterey, about 10 miles south of the mouth of the Salinas (at that time), was the capital city of Alta California, and the site of the 7 July 1846 invasion by American warships, commanded by Admiral J.D. Sloat.

=== 20th century ===
When Americans first arrived, the river approached Monterey Bay near Mulligan Hill just north of Marina. It turned north to flow parallel to the bay, separated by sand dunes, before flowing into Elkhorn Slough and finally entering the bay north of Moss Landing. Possibly because of flooding and human activity sometime between 1908 and 1910, the river mouth changed by 5.5 miles (8.8 km) to a new channel by Mulligan Hill. The old river bed was converted to farmland.

The historic increase in agriculture and settlement in the area, and the related increased water consumption demands have had a significant impact on the Salinas River. The river now typically remains dry or without flow for the majority of the year, and downstream (north) of King City remained fully dry or with zero flow during the years 2013–2016.

== Name ==
During the Spanish / Mexican / Mission period, the river was named El Rio de Monterey. When first encountered by the Spanish Portola Expedition on 27 September 1769, the members of the expedition at first suspected that they had found the Carmel River, that had been discovered earlier by Vizcaíno. One of the party members, Father Crespi, then proposed that the [Salinas] river might be a different river, and that it should therefore be given a new name, however he appears to have been over-ruled by the other members of his party at the time.

The first agreed upon name for the river, as it subsequently appeared on many Spanish and Mexican maps, was Rio de Monterey, presumably being named after the newly founded nearby town of Monterey, the capital of Alta California. The earliest recorded use of this name for the river was a reference made by Fr. Pedro Font on 4 March 1776. This name continued in use as late as 1850.

After the American annexation of the area, it was renamed the Salinas River. The river was apparently renamed as the "Salinas" river by an American cartographer in 1858, ten years after the 1848 American seizure of Alta California from Mexico. In 1858 the newer name "Salinas" first appeared on an American-made map as the Rio Salinas, most probably so renamed after the nearby American-founded town of Salinas, which in turn appears to have first been named in 1854 after the old Rancho Las Salinas land grant, parts of which included the city.

== River course ==
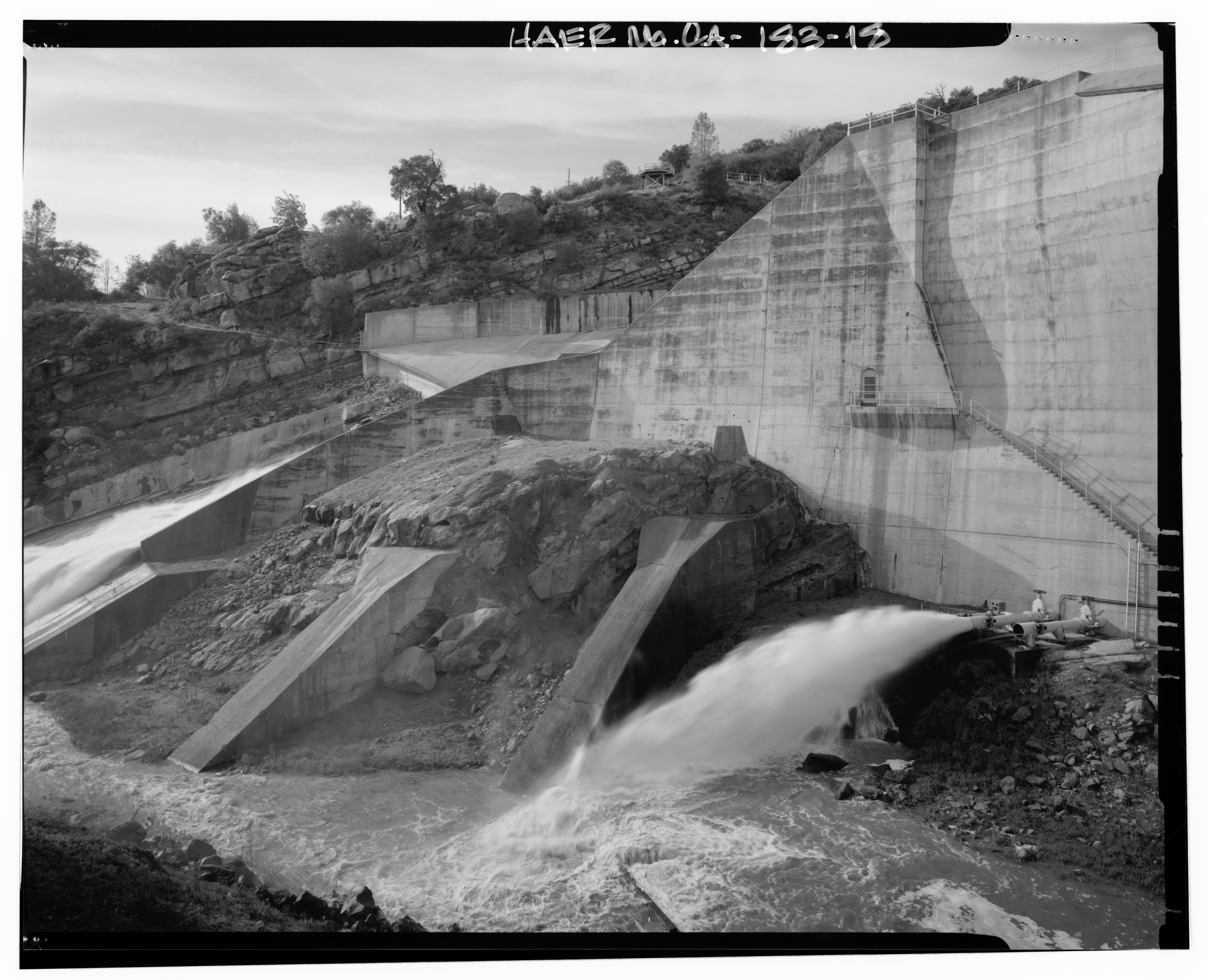
Salinas Dam, near the headwaters of the river

=== Headwaters ===
The river begins in southern San Luis Obispo County, approximately 2.5 miles (4.0 km) east of the summit point of Pine Ridge, at a point just off of Agua Escondido Road, coming down off of the slopes of the Los Machos Hills of the Los Padres National Forest. The only dam situated directly on the Salinas River (the Salinas Dam) forms the small Santa Margarita Lake.

=== Upriver ===
The Salinas flows down the valley bounded on its southwestern side by the Santa Lucia Mountain Range, and bounded on its northeastern side by the Gabilan Mountain Range. It flows past Atascadero and Paso Robles (to Monterey). It receives the natural outflow of the Estrella River and the controlled outflows of the Nacimiento and San Antonio reservoirs through their respective river tributaries in southern Monterey County.

The river passes through the active San Ardo Oil Field, and then into and through the Salinas Valley. It flows past many small towns in the valley, including King City, Greenfield, and Soledad, where it combines with the flash-flood prone Arroyo Seco, its fourth major tributary (in wet years).

=== Outflow ===
It flows 3 miles (4.8 km) south of the city of Salinas before cutting through Fort Ord and flows into central Monterey Bay approximately 3 miles west of Castroville.

The final stretch of the river forms a lagoon protected by the 367-acre (1.49 km^{2}) Salinas River National Wildlife Refuge. Due to the high amount of water loss along its path there is normally not a large amount of outflow to Monterey Bay. The mouth is usually blocked by sand except during winter high-water flows.

=== Pre-1906 course ===
The land owners altered the course of the river by filling in the river bed during the dry season. This allowed them to farm all of their land and use the water as they saw fit. The old stream bed went from the Old Salinas River, joining Elkhorn Slough on Monterey Bay near Moss Landing, to the present course where the main channel's mouth is directly on the Pacific Ocean.

The old Salinas River channel that diverts north behind the sand dunes along the ocean, acts as an overflow channel during the rainy season.

=== River Road ===
Commencing from Hill Town running south along the western banks of the Salinas River to Gonzales is River Road (County Route G17). This road also falls along the edge of the Santa Lucia Highlands AVA, giving rise to its designation as River Road Wine Trail.

== Ecology ==
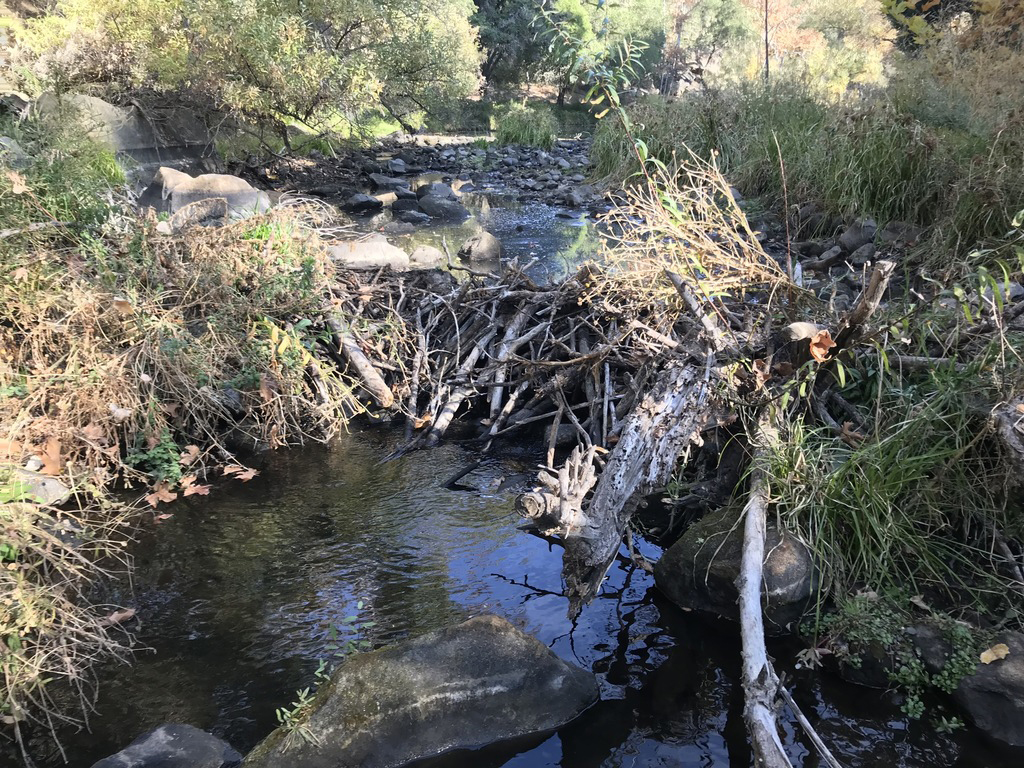
North American beaver have colonized the upper Salinas River watershed, as shown by this beaver dam 16 miles (26 km) upstream of Atascadero below the Salinas River dam. Courtesy of Stuart Suplick, 2019.

Before the arrival of Hispanic and American settlers in the area, the Salinas River was once home to abundant fish and beaver populations.

Regarding historical fish populations, the Arroyo Seco is the only major Salinas River tributary which has remained undammed and as of 2015, still supported a small remnant population of the threatened Central Coast Steelhead trout (Oncorhynchus mykiss) that once spawned throughout in the Salinas River watershed. At one time it was also an important middle link for salmon migrating from the Salinas River to Tassajara Creek and other tributaries.

Estrella River also remains undammed. A 2015 assessment of the survivability of the river's steelhead trout indicated that such a survival may be unlikely, due to the river's recent tendency to run dry for most of the year.

Other tributaries of the Salinas River that supported steelhead trout once included Paso Robles Creek, Jack Creek, Atascadero Creek, Santa Margarita Creek and Trout Creek in the upper reaches of the river. It once took over ten days for the steelhead from the upper part of the watershed to migrate to the Pacific Ocean near the City of Marina on Monterey Bay. From there, the steelhead would migrate to the area west of the Aleutian Islands before returning to the spawning grounds in the tributaries of the Salinas River. As noted, the trout life-cycle which requires an annual migration to the sea and then back, was broken during the dry-river conditions of the years 2013–2016, and the current fate of the river's steelhead trout remains uncertain at best.

Father Pedro Font described salmon in the Salinas River (Rio de Monterey) on the de Anza Expedition in March 1776:

... there are obtained also many good salmon which enter the river to spawn. Since they are fond of fresh water they ascend the streams so far that I am assured that even at the mission of San Antonio some of the fish which ascend the Rio de Monterey have been caught. Of this fish we ate almost every day while we were here.

If Father Font was describing salmon (and not steelhead), then his records suggest that salmon once traversed the Salinas River main stem and up its San Antonio River tributary to Mission San Antonio near what is now Jolon. This may support other historical observer records primarily in the form of oral histories taken and compiled by H.A. Franklin that placed Chinook salmon in the mainstem as far south as Atascadero where Highway 41 crosses, as well as southern tributaries of the Salinas River, including the Las Tablas Creek tributary of the Nacimiento River, and Jack Creek, a tributary of Paso Robles Creek west of Templeton.

In regards to the area's historical beaver population, after a period of depletion by 19th-century fur trappers, California golden beaver (Castor canadensis subauratus) populations rebounded and expanded their range from the Salinas River mouth to the San Antonio River tributary below its reservoir and beyond to the upper Salinas River watershed. More recent accounts suggested that beaver are no longer found along the northern reaches of the river, a recent comprehensive survey found beaver throughout the entire Salinas River mainstem and virtually all of its major tributaries, including the Estrella River.

== Agricultural use ==
The use of the river for irrigation in the Salinas Valley makes it one of the most productive agricultural regions in California. It is especially known as one of the principal regions for lettuce and artichokes in the United States.

The river is shallow above ground, periodically dry, with much of its flow underground. The underground flow results from numerous aquifers, which are recharged by water from the Salinas, especially from the Nacimiento and San Antonio lakes during the dry months. In the 18th and early 19th centuries, the river valley provided the route of El Camino Real, the principal overland route from southern to northern Alta California, used by Spanish explorers and missionaries and early Mexican settlers.

== See also ==
- Anne B. Fisher — "The Salinas, Upside Down River"
- List of rivers of California
