= Santa Margarita Lake =

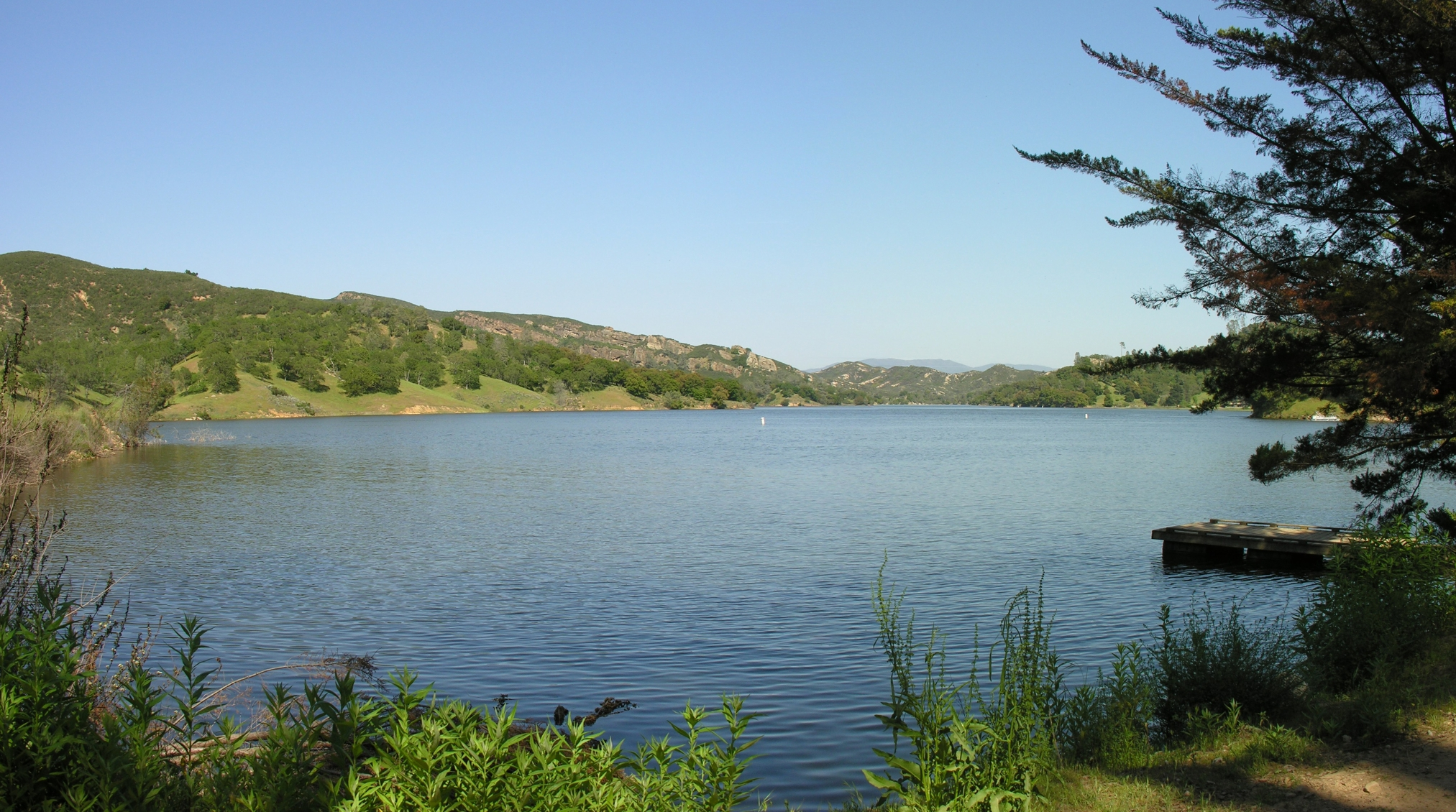

- Location within California Location within the United States
- Location: San Luis Obispo County, California
- Coordinates: 35°19′40″N 120°28′15″W
- Type: Reservoir
- Primary inflows: Salinas River
- Primary outflows: Salinas River
- Basin countries: United States
- Managing agency: United States Army Corps of Engineers, San Luis Obispo County
- Website: slocountyparks.com/camp/santa-margarita-lake/

Santa Margarita Lake, also called Salinas Reservoir, is a lake several miles southeast of the town of Santa Margarita in San Luis Obispo County, California. The lake was created by the building of Salinas Dam on the southern end of the Salinas River, very close to the river's origin in the Santa Lucia Range.

The dam was built by the United States Army Corps of Engineers in 1941 to provide water for Camp San Luis Obispo. It now provides the city of San Luis Obispo with a portion of its drinking water. The city also uses water from Lake Nacimiento and water from Whale Rock Reservoir in Cayucos. The lake is relatively small, with a capacity of 23,843 acre-feet (29,410,000 m^{3}). Since it is a municipal water source, human contact is prohibited. Boating, fishing and rowing are popular activities on the lake and there are camping sites on the shore. Fish found in Santa Margarita Lake include largemouth bass, catfish, carp, and various sunfish. The lake is home to the San Luis Obispo Rowing Club as well as Cal Poly Rowing.

There are dirt roads that provide access to almost the entire perimeter of the lake. There is a 15-mile per hour (24 km/h) speed limit, as the roads are bumpy and vehicles kick up a lot of dust, even at slow speeds. In addition, many visitors park on the side of the road to fish. The default speed limit on the lake itself is 5 miles per hour (8 km/h), but boats can travel up to 30 miles (48 km/h) per hour in certain areas, depending on conditions.

There is a proposal to raise the dam by 19 feet (8 m) with the addition of a spillway gate, which was part of the original design. The loss of trees from the additional capacity has been a major concern. In the area to be flooded there are 1,639 coast live oaks, 633 blue oaks, 198 valley oaks and 469 gray pines. The loss of oak trees is of ecological concern, since oak trees in the area are already contending with sudden oak death.

== See also ==
- List of lakes in California
