= Rancho Las Salinas =

Mexican land grant in California

Coordinates: 36.710°N 121.750°W

1877 map of Monterey county showing the Salinas River and many of the ranchos along it. Note El Tucho near the mouth of the river near Monterey.

Rancho Las Salinas, also called El Tucho was a historic land grant along the Salinas River in present day Monterey County, California.

== History ==
A four-square-league (Spanish legua and equivalent to about 17,700 acres, 27.7 mi^{2}, 72 km^{2}) Spanish land concession in the Salinas Valley was given in 1795 to Antonio Aceves and Antonio Romero and was the first such land concession in the Monterey Bay area. However, the grant was abandoned.

Subsequently, a one square league (about 4,400-acre, 6.9 mi^{2}, 18 km^{2}) Mexican land grant was made to Gabriel Espinosa by Mexican governor Nicolás Gutiérrez in 1839. The grant extended along the Salinas River from present day Marina to Salinas. Today's Espinosa Road and Espinosa Lake were named for the Espinosa family.

With the cession of California to the United States following the Mexican-American War, the 1848 Treaty of Guadalupe Hidalgo provided that the land grants would be honored. As required by the California Land Act of 1851, a claim for Rancho Las Salinas was filed with the Public Land Commission in 1853, and the grant was patented to Lucinda E. Pogue and the heirs of Gabriel Espinosa in 1867. Pogue received an undivided two-sevenths of the grant and each of the five children of Espinosa received one-seventh.

== See also ==
- Ranchos of Monterey County, California
- List of Ranchos of California
