= Greenfield, California =

City in California, United States

- City
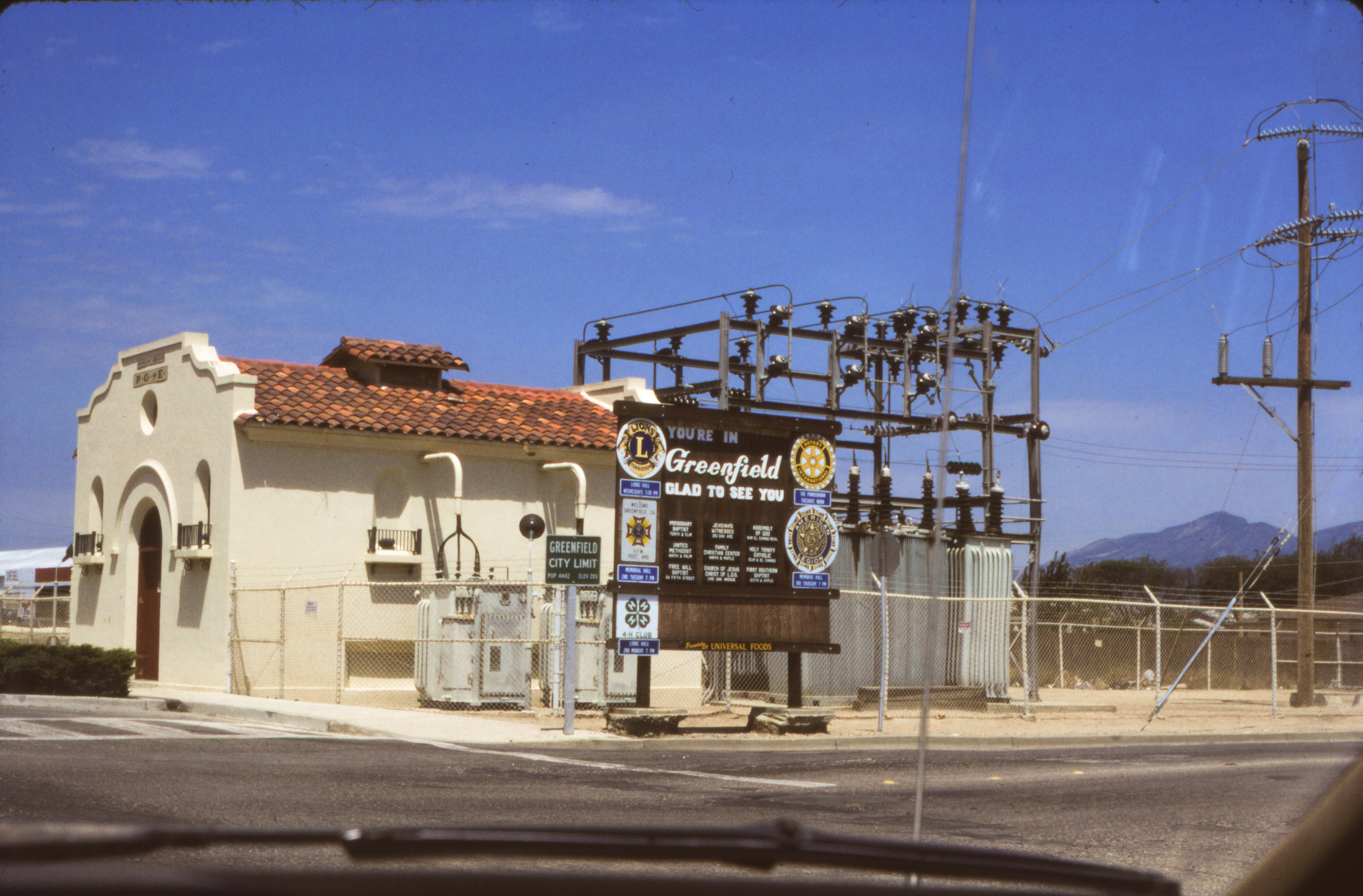
- Welcome sign in Greenfield
- Nickname: Broccoli Capital of the World
- Motto: "Where Historic El Camino Real Meets Monterey Wine Country"
- Interactive map of Greenfield, California
- Location in the United States
- Coordinates: 36°19′15″N 121°14′38″W
- Country: United States
- State: California
- County: Monterey
- Incorporated: January 7, 1947
- Named for: Edward Greenfield

Government
  - Mayor: Robert White
  - State senator: John Laird (D)
  - Assemblymember: Robert Rivas (D)
  - U. S. rep.: Zoe Lofgren (D)

Area
  - Total: 2.95 sq mi (7.6 km^{2})
  - Land: 2.91 sq mi (7.5 km^{2})
  - Water: 0.04 sq mi (0.10 km^{2}) 1.29%
- Elevation: 289 ft (88 m)

Population (2020)
  - Total: 18,937
  - Density: 6,507.6/sq mi (2,512.6/km^{2})
- Time zone: UTC-8 (Pacific)
  - Summer (DST): UTC-7 (PDT)
- ZIP code: 93927
- Area code: 831
- FIPS code: 06-30994
- GNIS feature IDs: 1660698, 2410657
- Website: www.greenfieldca.gov

Greenfield is a city in Monterey County, California, United States. Formerly Clarke Colony, it lies in the Salinas Valley, 3 miles (5km) east of Carmel Valley road, and 33 miles (53 km) southeast of Salinas, at an elevation of 289 feet (88 m). As of the 2020 census, the population was 18,937, up from 16,330 in the 2010 census. Its most well-known public event is the annual harvest festival. Greenfield is a member of the Association of Monterey Bay Area Governments.

== History ==
In 1902, the California Home Extension Association, Greenfield, purchased 4,000 acres (1,600 ha) of land that had been part of Rancho Arroyo Seco, a Mexican land grant deeded to Joaquín de la Torre in 1840. The land was put up for sale at a public drawing in Los Angeles in 1905. Buyers could purchase an acre with water rights for about $37.50. A purchase of 2.5 acres (1.0 ha) came with an added benefit — a lot in town.

The Clark Colony Water Company became the organization for water distribution and filled the city with water from the nearby Arroyo Seco. The organized water canal system and ideal growing conditions attracted people of Danish, Swiss and other nationalities from surrounding areas to settle in this new colony. Originally, the town was going to be named "Clark City", but that was nixed by the U.S. Postal Service which informed the city there were too many "Clark Cities" in the state. Instead, the community named the town after one of its early founders and president of the Association, Edward Greenfield.

In the 1930, wells were dug to supplement water being drawn from the river, which created a year-round water supply.

The Clark Colony Water Company still holds 1916 Prior Rights guaranteeing delivery to its members a certain amount of water from the Arroyo Seco before any other agencies. The early canals are still viable and visible throughout the original land acreage.

Greenfield was recognized as a municipality by the state legislature and incorporated on January 7, 1947. Greenfield's first mayor was Tom Rogers. Greenfield’s first directly elected mayor and first Hispanic/ Latino mayor was Elias de Leon, Jr. in 1986.

== Geography and climate ==
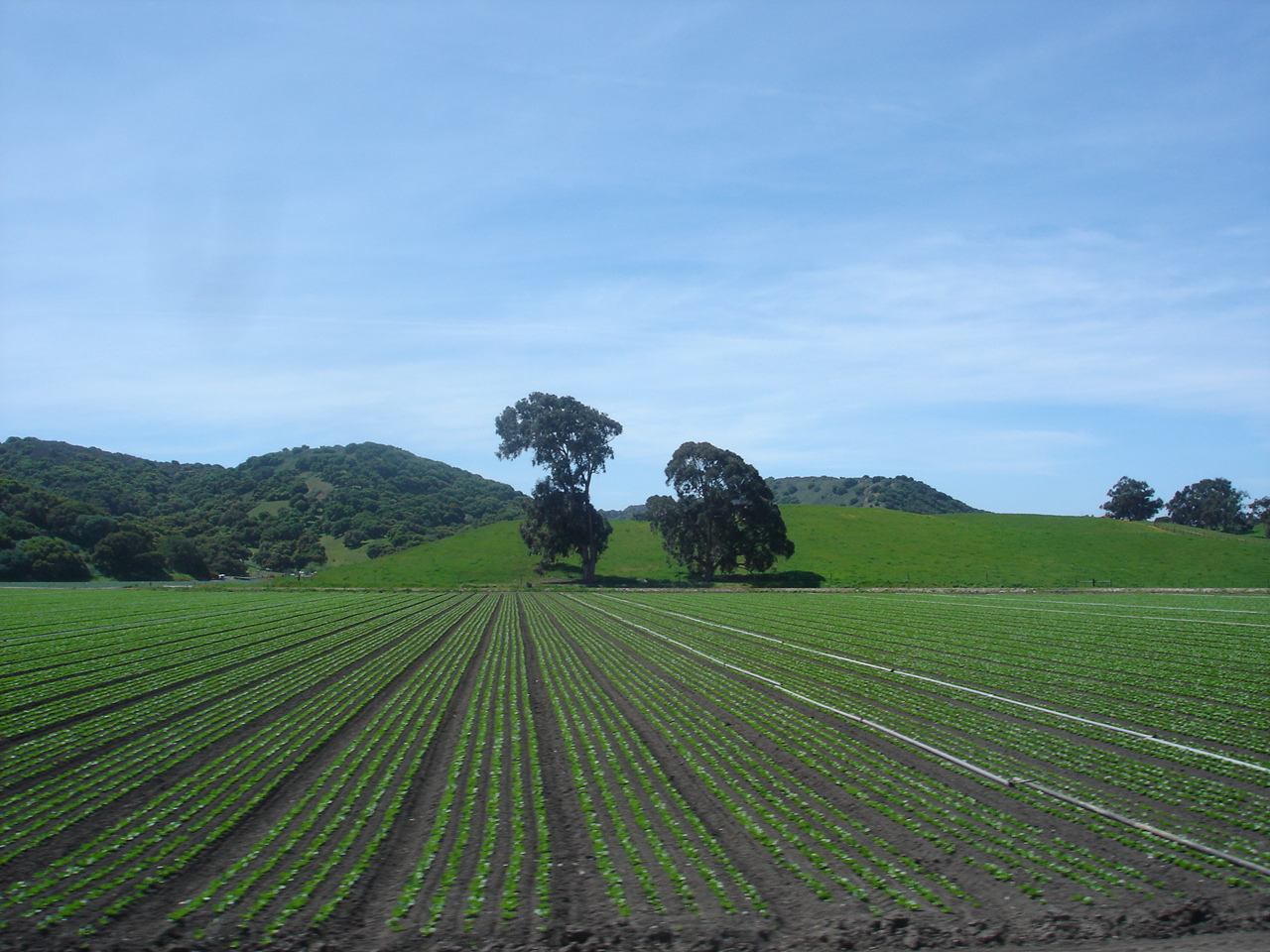
Salinas Valley, on River Road near Marina

The city of Greenfield is located in the heart of the Salinas Valley, between the Gabilan Range to the east and the Santa Lucia Range to the west. Greenfield is approximately 145 miles (233 km) by highway south of San Francisco, 95 miles (153 km) south of San Jose and 65 miles (105 km) north of Paso Robles. U.S. Route 101 passes through the city, with access from four exits.

According to the United States Census Bureau, the city has a total area of 2.95 square miles (7.64 km^{2}), of which 0.04 square miles (0.10 km^{2}), or 1.29%, are water.

Due to its location near California's Central Coast, the area is filled with rich soil and desirable climate, ideal for many agricultural and wine companies. Some of the vineyards and wineries located nearby are Chalone, Scheid Vineyards, Paraiso Vineyards, Pisoni Vineyards, Hahn Estates Smith & Hook, San Saba, J.Lohr, Kendall-Jackson, Ventana, Hess Select, Estancia, the Michaud Vineyard, and Graff Family Vineyard.

The climate for Greenfield is moderate, with average temperatures around 40 °F (4 °C) in winter and about 80 °F (27 °C) in summer. High temperatures may reach the low 90s °F (32-33 °C) during mid-summer. Most rain falls between October and March; there are 14-20 inches (35.6 – 51 cm) of rain annually.

== Demographics ==
Historical population
Census	Pop.	Note	%±
1950	1,309		—
1960	1,680		28.3%
1970	2,608		55.2%
1980	4,181		60.3%
1990	7,464		78.5%
2000	12,583		68.6%
2010	16,330		29.8%
2020	18,937		16.0%
U.S. Decennial Census

=== 2020 census ===
As of the 2020 census, Greenfield had a population of 18,937 and a population density of 6,498.6 inhabitants per square mile (2,509.1/km^{2}). The age distribution was 35.2% under the age of 18, 10.7% aged 18 to 24, 29.7% aged 25 to 44, 17.7% aged 45 to 64, and 6.7% who were 65 years of age or older. The median age was 27.3 years. For every 100 females, there were 101.9 males, and for every 100 females age 18 and over, there were 100.5 males age 18 and over.

The census reported that 18,901 people (99.8% of the population) lived in households, 36 people (0.2%) lived in non-institutionalized group quarters, and no one was institutionalized. 99.2% of residents lived in urban areas, while 0.8% lived in rural areas.

There were 4,090 households, of which 66.5% had children under the age of 18 living in them. Of all households, 59.0% were married-couple households, 8.2% were cohabiting-couple households, 21.8% had a female householder with no spouse or partner present, and 11.1% had a male householder with no spouse or partner present. About 7.6% of households were one person households, and 2.9% were one person aged 65 or older. The average household size was 4.62, and there were 3,654 families (89.3% of all households).

There were 4,207 housing units at an average density of 1,443.7 units per square mile (557.4 units/km^{2}), of which 4,090 (97.2%) were occupied. Of occupied units, 49.7% were owner-occupied and 50.3% were renter-occupied. The homeowner vacancy rate was 0.5% and the rental vacancy rate was 1.7%.

Racial composition as of the 2020 census
Race	Number	Percent
White	2,651	14.0%
Black or African American	98	0.5%
American Indian and Alaska Native	1,692	8.9%
Asian	216	1.1%
Native Hawaiian and Other Pacific Islander	25	0.1%
Some other race	9,204	48.6%
Two or more races	5,051	26.7%
Hispanic or Latino (of any race)	17,804	94.0%

=== 2023 American Community Survey estimates ===
In 2023, the US Census Bureau estimated that 40.6% of the population were foreign-born. Of all people aged 5 or older, 15.6% spoke only English at home, 82.1% spoke Spanish, 0.1% spoke other Indo-European languages, 0.5% spoke Asian or Pacific Islander languages, and 1.7% spoke other languages. Of those aged 25 or older, 50.6% were high school graduates and 8.9% had a bachelor's degree.

The median household income in 2023 was $78,946, and the per capita income was $20,336. About 9.5% of families and 12.2% of the population were below the poverty line.

=== 2010 census ===
At the 2010 census Greenfield had a population of 16,330. The population density was 7,647.9 inhabitants per square mile (2,952.9/km^{2}). The racial makeup of Greenfield was 5,976 (36.6%) White, 183 (1.1%) African American, 878 (5.4%) Native American, 179 (1.1%) Asian, 13 (0.1%) Pacific Islander, 8,453 (51.8%) from other races, and 648 (4.0%) from two or more races. Hispanic or Latino of any race were 14,917 persons (91.3%).

The census reported that 16,301 people (99.8% of the population) lived in households, 29 (0.2%) lived in non-institutionalized group quarters, and no one was institutionalized.

There were 3,460 households, 2,358 (68.2%) had children under the age of 18 living in them, 2,273 (65.7%) were opposite-sex married couples living together, 526 (15.2%) had a female householder with no husband present, 301 (8.7%) had a male householder with no wife present. There were 251 (7.3%) unmarried opposite-sex partnerships, and 22 (0.6%) same-sex married couples or partnerships. 282 households (8.2%) were one person and 115 (3.3%) had someone living alone who was 65 or older. The average household size was 4.71. There were 3,100 families (89.6% of households); the average family size was 4.72.

The age distribution was 5,843 people (35.8%) under the age of 18, 2,159 people (13.2%) aged 18 to 24, 5,023 people (30.8%) aged 25 to 44, 2,530 people (15.5%) aged 45 to 64, and 775 people (4.7%) who were 65 or older. The median age was 25.5 years. For every 100 females, there were 109.8 males. For every 100 females age 18 and over, there were 110.9 males.

There were 3,752 housing units at an average density of 1,757.2 per square mile, of the occupied units 1,829 (52.9%) were owner-occupied and 1,631 (47.1%) were rented. The homeowner vacancy rate was 3.4%; the rental vacancy rate was 5.9%. 7,874 people (48.2% of the population) lived in owner-occupied housing units and 8,427 people (51.6%) lived in rental housing units.

=== 2006 growth estimates ===
Greenfield is the second most populous city in the Salinas Valley and the fifth most populous city in Monterey County. In 2006, Greenfield was the fourth fastest growing city in California, growing 15.6%, from 13,270 in 2005 to 15,335 in 2006.

=== Immigration ===
In recent years, the town has seen an influx of immigrants from the Mexican state of Oaxaca. Many Oaxacans speak indigenous languages not related to English or Spanish. Probably the largest single bloc of such immigrants are speakers of the Copala Triqui language, who have fled from poverty and long-standing armed conflict in their native region.

== Media ==
Local radio stations include K-DON FM - 102.5. Television service for the community comes from the Monterey-Salinas-Santa Cruz designated market area (DMA). Locale newspapers include the South County Index, Greenfield News, and Monterey County Herald.

== Economy ==
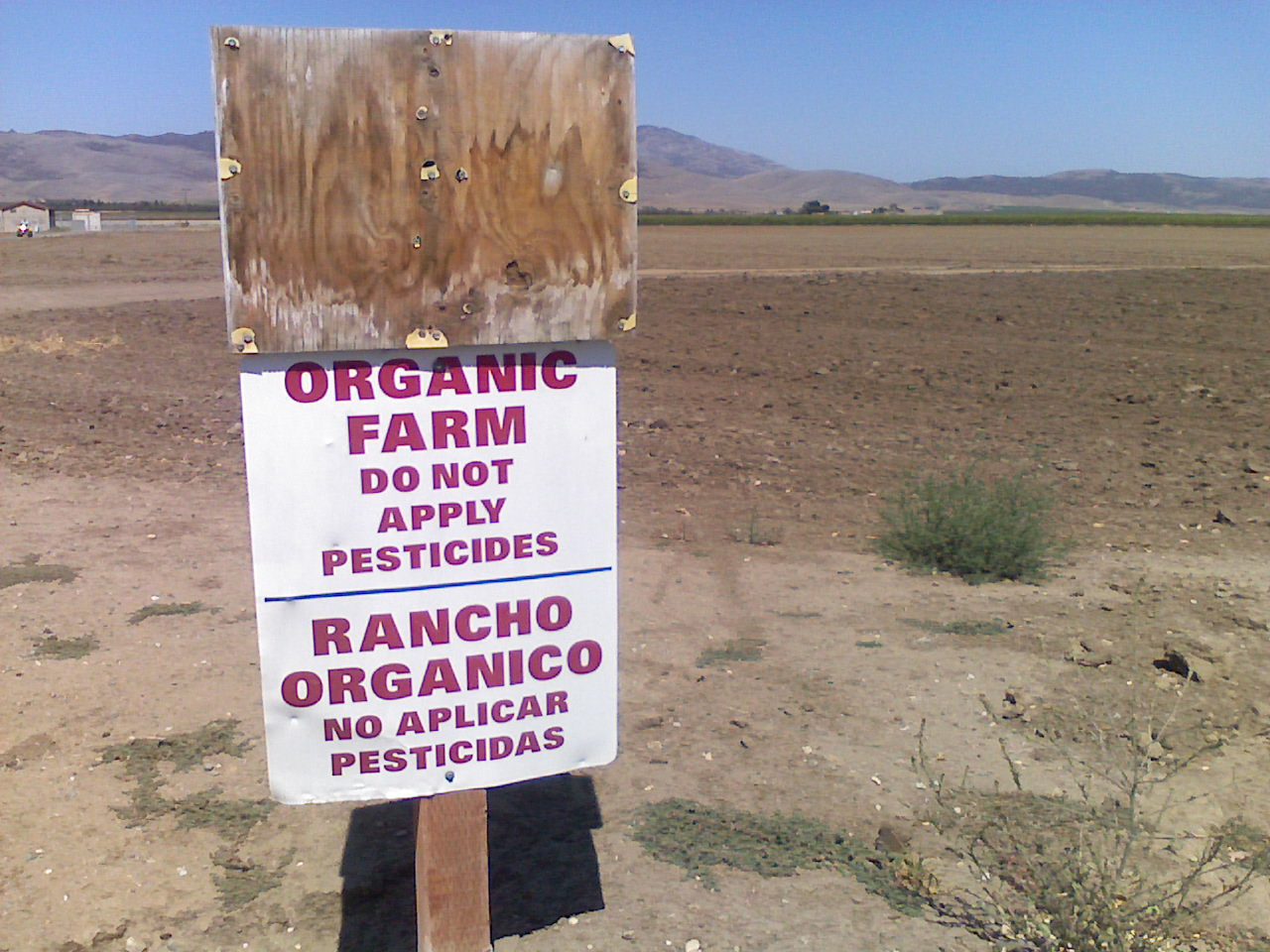
Organic farmland

The city of Greenfield is centered in one of the most productive agricultural areas in the world. About 60 percent of the leaf lettuce grown in the United States is grown in the Salinas Valley. The area has often been coined as the "Salad Bowl of the World." More than $3 billion (US) worth of fruits, vegetables and nuts are produced and shipped annually across the U.S. and abroad. (2018 crop report). As a result, many major vegetable producers are headquartered in the nearby city of Salinas. Local tourism is increasing as more people are attracted to the area, which is also known as the center of "Steinbeck Country" because of famed author John Steinbeck. The area is also known as a premier wine grape growing region due to the rich soil and desirable climate. Vineyards, wineries and wine tasting rooms continue to expand throughout the region.

== Education ==
The Greenfield Union School District(GUSD) has four elementary schools and one middle school. The district serves around 2,500 students grades K-8. Greenfield High School (GHS) belongs to South Monterrey County Joint Union High School District (SMCJUHSD). Greenfield High School serves around 974 students. On February 27, 2008, Greenfield Elementary was placed under no help due to the school's achievement in raising their Standardized Testing and Reporting (STAR) Results under the No Child Left Behind Act for the past five years by Governor Arnold Schwarzenegger and Superintendent of Public Instruction Jack O'Connell.

== Arts and culture ==
Greenfield holds an annual harvest festival each third Sunday of October.

A northern campus for the Yanks Air Museum of Chino, California is under construction in Greenfield on a 440 acres (1.8 km^{2}) plot known as the Hanson Ranch, which was purchased in 1994 by museum founders Charles and Judith Nichols. In World War II the Hanson Ranch was the site of the Hanson Auxiliary Field. The new airstrip will use the original location and will see World War II aircraft landing there some 75 years later. This planned project will include a museum facility and the 4,250 feet (1,300 m) runway that will support both museum flight operations as well as serve the private aviation needs of both museum visitors and local aviators. The new museum facility is not intended to replace the existing facility in Chino, but to greatly expand the opportunities.

Greenfield is constructing the Tom Rogers Community Museum. Named after the first mayor of Greenfield, it will showcase the history of the city as far back as 1905.

First Night Monterey with the Arts Council of Monterey County has opened, in conjunction with the City of Greenfield, the Greenfield Cultural Arts Center located at 215 El Camino Real.

== Sister cities ==
- King City, California
- Soledad, California
- Gonzales, California
- Chualar, California
- Chupicuaro, GTO, MX

== See also ==
- Coastal California
- List of school districts in Monterey County, California
