= Nacimiento Dam =

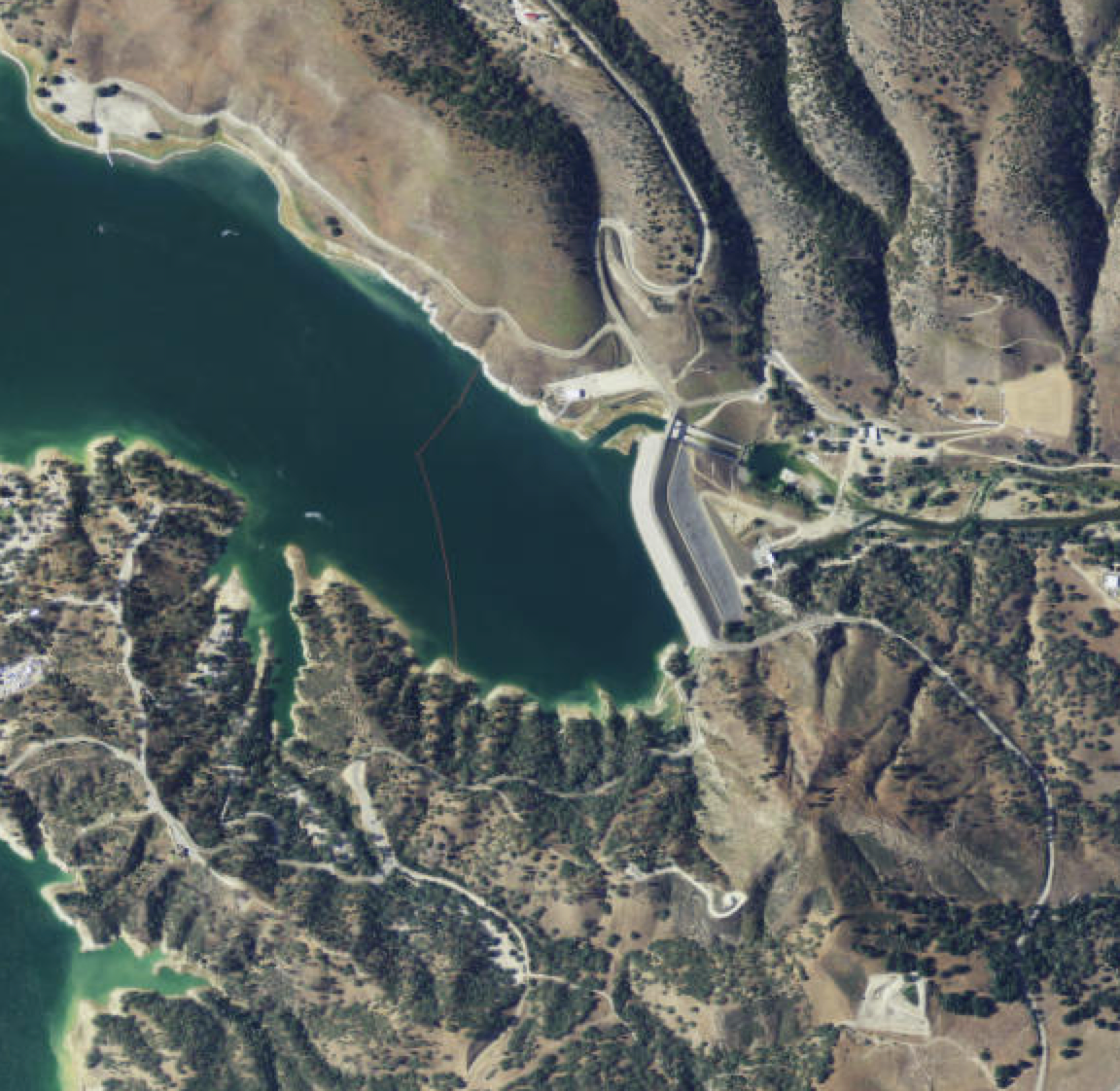
- Satellite view

- Location within California
- Country: United States
- Location: San Luis Obispo County, California
- Coordinates: 35°45′31″N 120°53′06″W
- Purpose: Irrigation, flood control
- Construction began: 1955; 71 years ago
- Opening date: 1957; 69 years ago
- Owner: Monterey County Water Resources Agency

Dam and spillways
- Type of dam: Earthfill
- Impounds: Nacimiento River
- Height (foundation): 210 ft (64 m)
- Length: 1,630 ft (500 m)
- Elevation at crest: 825 ft (251 m)

Reservoir
- Creates: Lake Nacimiento
- Total capacity: 377,900 acre⋅ft (466,100,000 m^{3})
- Catchment area: 324 mi^{2} (840 km^{2})
- Surface area: 5,400 acres (2,200 ha)

Power Station
- Installed capacity: 4000 KW
- Annual generation: 12,352,000 KWh (2010)

Nacimiento Dam is a dam on the Nacimiento River about 10 miles (16 km) northwest of Paso Robles, California in the United States. The primary purpose of the dam is to provide groundwater recharge for agriculture in Monterey County and northern San Luis Obispo County supported by the Salinas Valley aquifer, as well as flood control, domestic water supply, and hydropower. It forms Lake Nacimiento, popular for boating, fishing and camping, and known locally as the "Dragon Lake" due to its shape.

Although located in San Luis Obispo County, the Nacimiento Dam and nearby San Antonio Dam, which forms Lake San Antonio, are both owned and operated by the Monterey County Water Resources Agency. It was completed in 1957.

== History ==
Prior to the construction of Nacimiento Dam, the lower Nacimiento River (and the Salinas River) only flowed during the wet season between December and May. Without enough time to be absorbed into the Salinas Valley aquifer, much of the stormwater flowed directly into the Pacific Ocean. As the Salinas Valley developed as a major agricultural region dependent on groundwater, the Monterey County Flood Control and Water Conservation District (now Monterey County Water Resources Agency, MCWRA) proposed a reservoir on the Nacimiento River to capture winter floods, and release it at a low enough rate throughout the year to maximize groundwater recharge. Because the Nacimiento River is the biggest tributary of the Salinas River, the dam would capture up to half the annual peak flows in the entire Salinas River Basin.

Under the county plan, water would only be stored when the flow rate at the confluence of the Nacimiento and Salinas Rivers exceeded 300 cubic feet per second (8.5 m^{3}/s), which was estimated as the highest volume the riverbed can naturally absorb. When natural runoff exceeded this amount, no water would be released. The California Department of Fish and Game (DFG) opposed the project due to the detrimental impacts this would have on winter run steelhead trout. The DFG sought a minimum flow of 50 cubic feet per second (1.4 m^{3}/s) in the Nacimiento River, which the county believed would place too great a demand on the new reservoir. Ultimately, the county won and was granted the water rights for the reservoir in 1955 without any provisions for fishery flows.

Construction of Nacimiento Dam began in 1955 and was completed in 1957. The reservoir filled to capacity for the first time in 1958. After further petitioning from the DFG, the MCWRA now maintains a minimum flow of 10 cubic feet per second (0.28 m^{3}/s) in the Nacimiento River except in years of severe drought.

Monterey County is entitled to most of the water supply from Lake Nacimiento. The dam releases an average of 194,000 acre-feet (239,000,000 m^{3}) of water per year for groundwater recharge and instream flows in the Nacimiento River (also including occasional releases for flood control). San Luis Obispo County has a smaller allocation of 17,500 acre-feet (21,600,000 m^{3}) per year which is used for domestic water supply via the Nacimiento Water Project, providing water to Paso Robles, Templeton, Atascadero and San Luis Obispo. Although proposed since the 1950s, the Nacimiento Water Project was not completed until 2011.

== Specifications ==
Nacimiento Dam is an earthfill dam with a height of 210 feet (64 m) and a crest length of 1,630 feet (500 m). Altogether, the dam contains 3,270,000 cubic yards (2,500,000 m^{3}) of material. The crest of the dam is 825 feet (251 m) above sea level, and the spillway crest elevation is 787.75 feet (240.11 m). The concrete spillway is located on the north side of the dam and is controlled by an inflatable Obermeyer gate. The dam also has two outlet works, a low level valve for normal water releases with a design capacity of 460 cubic feet per second (13 m^{3}/s), and a high level valve for flood control with a capacity of 5,500 cubic feet per second (160 m^{3}/s). There is also a small hydroelectric plant at the dam with a capacity of 4,000 kilowatts.

Lake Nacimiento has a design capacity of 377,900 acre-feet (0.4661 km^{3}) at a water level of 800 feet (240 m) (the top of the spillway gates). The lake receives water from a drainage basin of 324 square miles (840 km^{2}) and covers up to 5,400 acres (2,200 ha). The conservation pool, which is used for irrigation, groundwater recharge and environmental flows, extends from the minimum operating level of 670 ft (200 m) to the spillway crest of 787.75 ft (240.11 m); the flood control pool is all storage above the spillway crest. The surcharge (emergency flood control) pool extends from the spillway gate to the top of the dam at 825 ft (251 m). At this maximum level, the lake holds 538,000 acre-feet (0.664 km^{3}) and increases to 7,149 acres (2,893 ha).

Due to the flooding tendency of the Nacimiento River, which has been called "the most active watershed in the state", the reservoir can fill quickly to capacity during wet winters. The spillway gates are left open between November 1 and May 1 in order to prevent the lake from overfilling. In contrast, it is often at low levels for multiple consecutive years during droughts. The lake spilled in 1958, 1969, 1983, 2011, 2017 and 2023.

== See also ==
- List of dams and reservoirs in California
