= Lower Lake Community United Methodist Church =

- Location within California
- 38.911284°N 122.608883°W
- Location: 16255 2nd Street; Lower Lake, California; 16264 Main St, Lower Lake, CA 95457 (newer building)
- Country: United States
- Denomination: United Methodist

Architecture
- Years built: 1840s 2018-2020 (new building)

Specifications
- Materials: Redwood

Clergy
- Pastor: John Pavoni

Lower Lake Community United Methodist Church is a United Methodist Church in the town of Lower Lake, California.

== History ==
Lower Lake Community United Methodist Church, built with a redwood frame, was constructed in the 1840s during Lower Lake's agricultural period. Later, work was done to the roof to fill in the small gaps between the wooden planks. The church's attic contained 20 handmade wood chairs, antique dowels and a communion table built by a member of the church. In August 2016 the church was destroyed in the Clayton Fire. On July 18, 2019, it was reported that a new building was being erected on Main Street, with an estimated completion time of spring 2020. On July 3, 2020, the church announced it had officially reopened, although the building was still undergoing some finishing work.
