= Canyon Fire =

Canyon Fire may refer to:

- Canyon Fire (2007), a 2007 wildfire in Los Angeles County, California
- Canyon Fire (2016), a 2016 wildfire on Vandenberg Air Force Base in Santa Barbara County, California
- Canyon Fire 2, a 2017 wildfire in Anaheim Hills, California
- Canyon Fire (2025), a wildfire in Southern California in August 2025
