= Cedar Fire (disambiguation) =

The Cedar Fire may refer to:

- Cedar Fire, an enormous wildfire that burned in San Diego County, California in 2003
- Cedar Fire (2016), a wildfire that burned in Kern County, California in 2016
