= San Antonio River (California) =

River in California, United States

Coordinates: 35.85982°N 120.803656°W

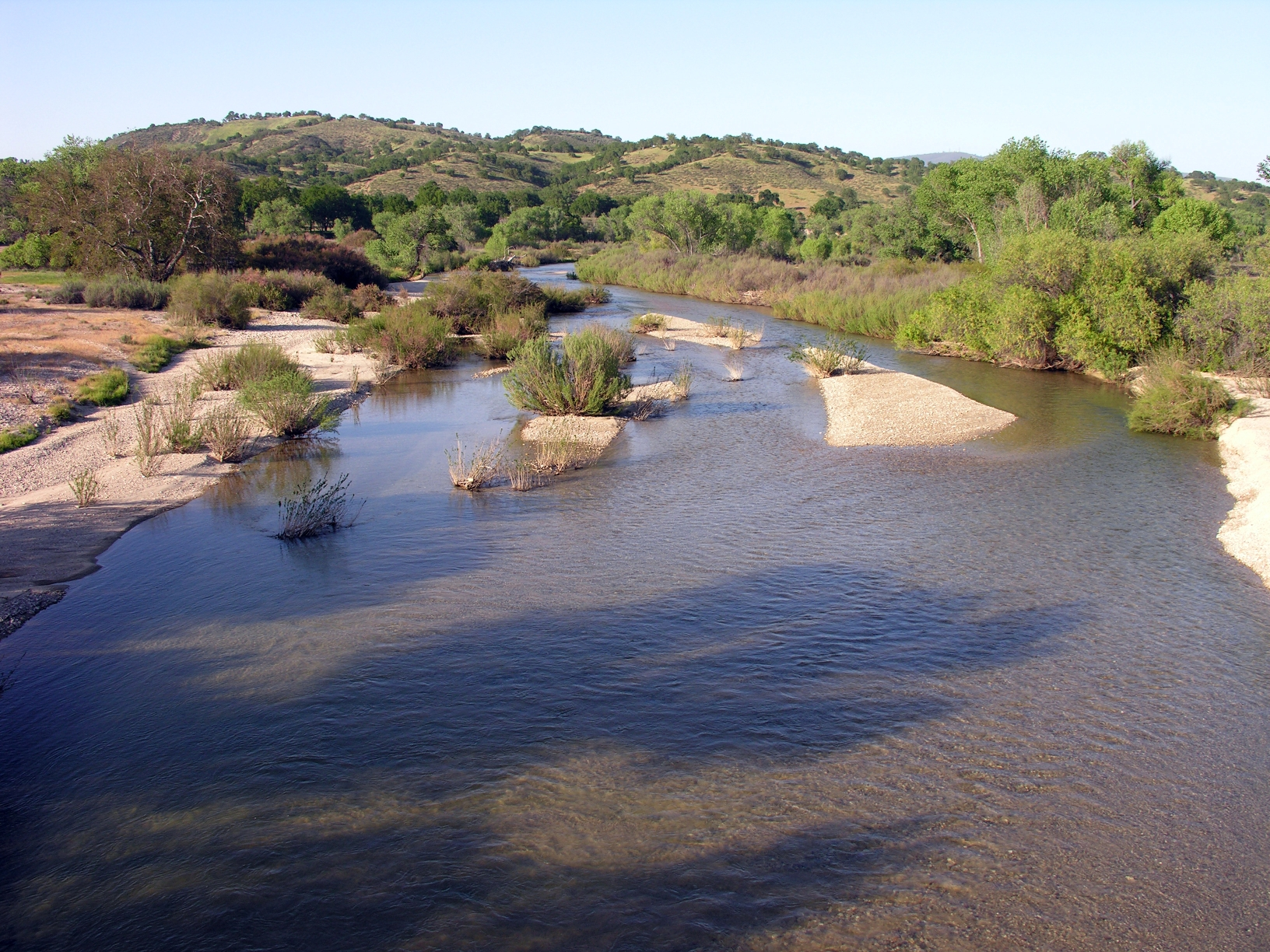
An image of the San Antonio River, upstream of Lake San Antonio

The San Antonio River is a 58.8-mile-long (94.6 km) river in southern Monterey County, California. The river was used as an irrigation source for Mission San Antonio de Padua.

== Geography ==
The river travels southeast from its headwaters in the Santa Lucia Range in the Los Padres National Forest and into Lake San Antonio. This is a reservoir behind the San Antonio Dam, an earth-fill dam on the river that forms the largest lake in the county. Downstream from the dam, the river travels east until it joins the Salinas River.

The Nacimiento River, which feeds Lake Nacimiento and is also a Salinas River tributary, parallels the San Antonio River's path several miles to the southwest.

== Ecology ==
After depletion by 19th century fur trappers, California golden beaver (Castor canadensis subauratus) have expanded their range from the San Antonio River below the reservoir to the Salinas River mainstem.
