= Nacimiento River =

River in the United States of America

Nacimiento River Spanish: Río Nacimiento
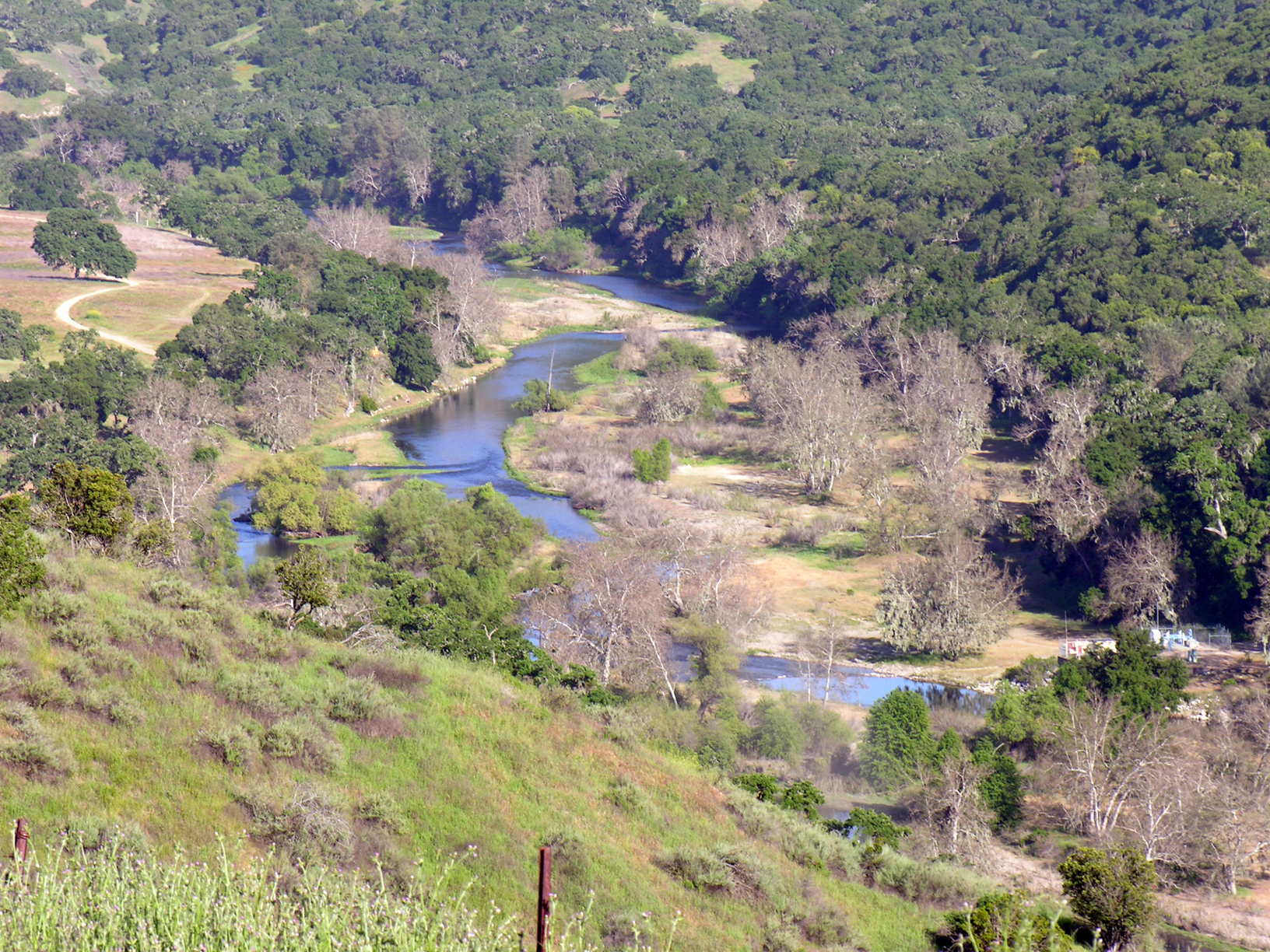
- The river downstream of Nacimiento Dam

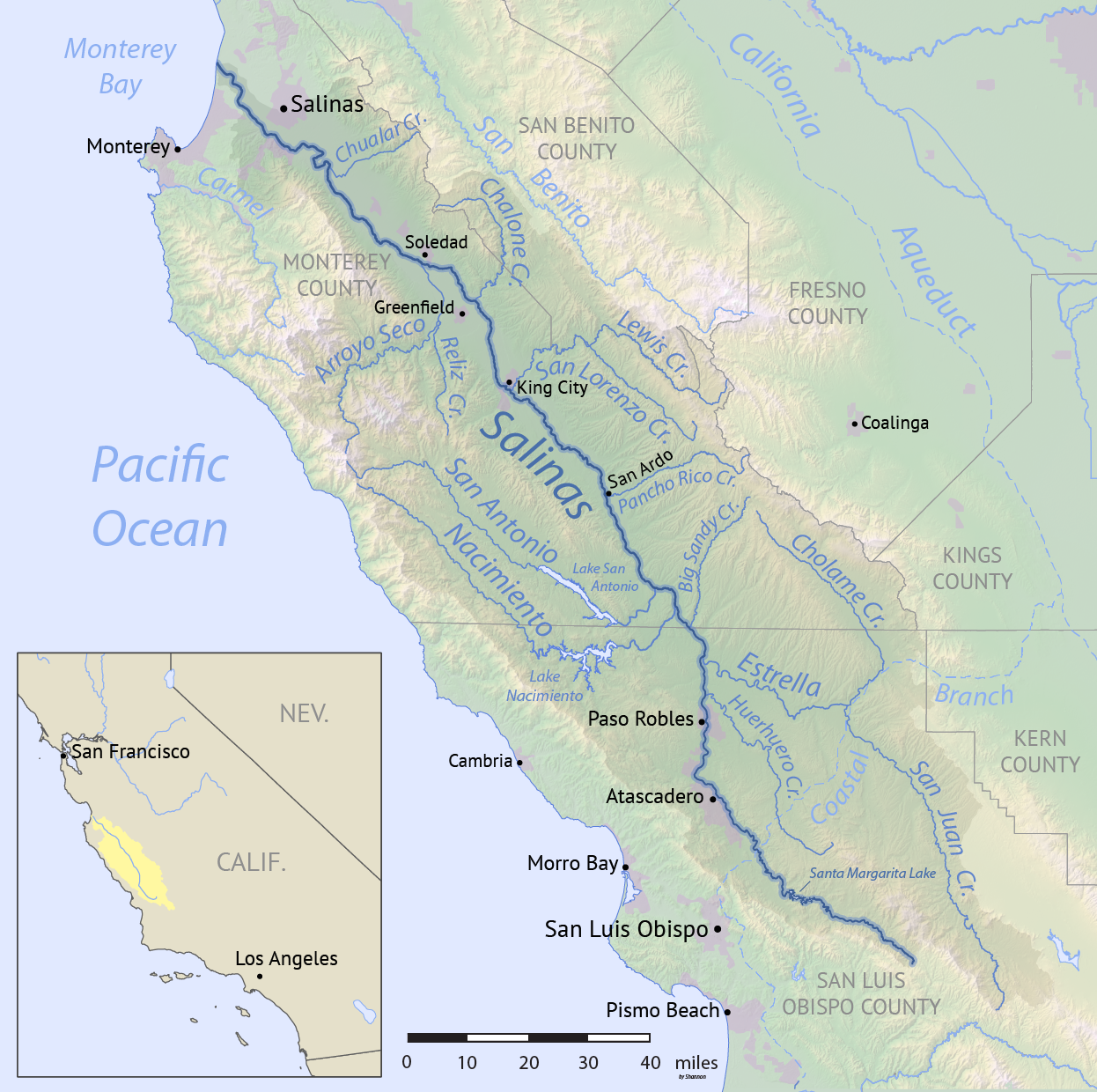
- Map of the Salinas River watershed, including the Nacimiento River

Location
- Country: United States
- State: California

Physical characteristics
- Source: Unnamed spring
  - location: Santa Lucia Mountains, San Luis Obispo County
  - coordinates: 36°01′55″N 121°28′21″W
  - elevation: 3,280 ft (1,000 m)
- Mouth: Salinas River
  - location: Camp Roberts, Monterey County
  - coordinates: 35°49′57″N 120°45′30″W
  - elevation: 584 ft (178 m)
- Length: 64.8 mi (104.3 km)
- Basin size: 350 sq mi (910 km^{2})
- Discharge
  - location: below Nacimiento Dam
  - average: 272 cu ft/s (7.7 m^{3}/s)
  - minimum: 0 cu ft/s (0 m^{3}/s)
  - maximum: 7,340 cu ft/s (208 m^{3}/s)

Basin features
- Tributaries
  - right: Los Burros Creek, Las Tablas Creek

The Nacimiento River (Spanish: Río Nacimiento) is a 64.8-mile-long (104.3 km) river in southern Monterey County and northern San Luis Obispo County, California. A large portion of the river's run is on military reservations. The river's upper reaches are inside Fort Hunter Liggett, Lake Nacimiento is in the middle and the lower reaches are inside Camp Roberts. It is the largest tributary of the Salinas River in terms of streamflow.

== Etymology ==
On September 24 and December 17, 1769, the Portolà expedition crossed the river, which they named Río de las Truchas (Spanish for "trout"), saying "We pitched camp on the bank of a small river containing much running water, which, in several pools or eddies, held a considerable number of trout, and other species of fish." Nacimiento, meaning 'source of the river' in Spanish, was also given to the river by Father Juan Crespí of the Portolà expedition September 21, 1769. Later the river was referred to as Nacimiento by Juan Bautista de Anza who, on April 16, 1774, crossed the river and assumed wrongly that Nacimiento had been named for the nativity, also a Spanish translation.

== Course ==
Rising south of Cone Peak, within the Ventana Wilderness of Los Padres National Forest in Monterey County, the Nacimiento River flows southeast through a rugged canyon before emerging in a large alluvial valley within Fort Hunter Liggett. After being joined by Stony Creek about 15 miles (24 km) west of Lockwood, the Nacimiento River flows through a series of remote canyons and narrow valleys along the eastern foothills of the Santa Lucia Range.

Soon after crossing into San Luis Obispo County, the river flows into Lake Nacimiento, the largest reservoir in San Luis Obispo County, formed by Nacimiento Dam 18 miles (29 km) downstream. The reservoir is operated by the Monterey County Water Resources Agency and was built in 1957 to provide water for irrigation and groundwater recharge, drought protection, and to provide recreational opportunities such as swimming, boating, fishing and water skiing.

Downstream from the dam, the Nacimiento River travels east for about 10 miles (16 km) until it joins the Salinas River at Camp Roberts, Monterey County. Except for its uppermost reaches and headwaters, as well as the short stretch below Nacimiento Dam, much of the river is dry in summer and fall, although perennial pools abound.

Tributaries to the upper river include Little Burnett, Tabacco, Salmon, Las Berros, San Miguel, Stony, El Piojo, Waller, and Sapaque Creeks. Streams which flow into the lower river include Las Tablas, Franklin, Town, Dip, Snake, and Kavanaugh creeks. Additional main stem creeks include: Carrals Spring, Slickrock Creek, Stony Creek, San Miguel Creek, Upper Los Berros Creek, N. Fork Los Burros Creek, San Miguelitos Ranch, Gabilan Creek, Los Bueyes Creek, Lower Los Burros Creek, Oak Flat, Waller Creek, Mesa Coyote, Pozo Honda Creek, Turtle Creek and Gulch House Creek.

== Watershed ==
The Nacimiento River watershed comprises 361.5 square miles (936 km^{2}), with about 54 percent in San Luis Obispo County and 46 percent in Monterey County. The crest of the Santa Lucia Range, part of the Coast Ranges, forms the southwestern boundary of the Nacimiento River watershed. The San Antonio River watershed divide forms its northeastern boundary. The San Antonio River, which feeds Lake San Antonio and is also a Salinas River tributary, mirrors the Nacimiento's path several miles to the northeast.

About 46 percent of the watershed is agriculture and rangeland, with another 33.7 percent classified as open space, recreational or rural land. About 15.7 percent of the watershed is occupied by Camp Roberts and only 5 percent is urbanized. As of 2010, only about 3,000 people lived in the Nacimiento watershed.

Annual precipitation ranges from 11 inches (280 mm) in the valleys, to 41 inches (1,000 mm) at the river's headwaters.

== Ecology ==
The Nacimiento watershed includes several different types of California oak woodland communities, including blue oak, coast live oak, and valley oak mixed with foothill pine, manzanita and chaparral. Montane hardwood-conifer forests dominated by Coulter pine occur at higher elevations, primarily in the headwaters. Valley floors consist of a mix of native bunchgrass and needlegrass as well as non-native annual grasses seeded for grazing. Because most streams in the watershed are seasonal, there are only small areas of riparian and wetland habitat.

The Cone Peak Gradient Research Natural Area located near the source of the Nacimiento River is an area unusual for its ecological diversity and presence of the rare Santa Lucia fir (Abies bracteata).

Threatened and endangered species in the watershed including the arroyo toad (Bufo californicus), western pond turtle (Actinemys marmorata), California red-legged frog (Rana draytonii) and the California condor (Gymnogyps californianus).

The Nacimiento River historically comprised some of the best steelhead trout (Oncorhynchus mykiss) spawning and rearing habitats in the Salinas River watershed. The Nacimiento Dam was constructed without fish passage and the historic habitats above these dams are no longer available to steelhead.

== See also ==
- List of rivers of California
