= Border Fire =

2016 wildfire in Southern California

- Part of the 2016 California wildfires
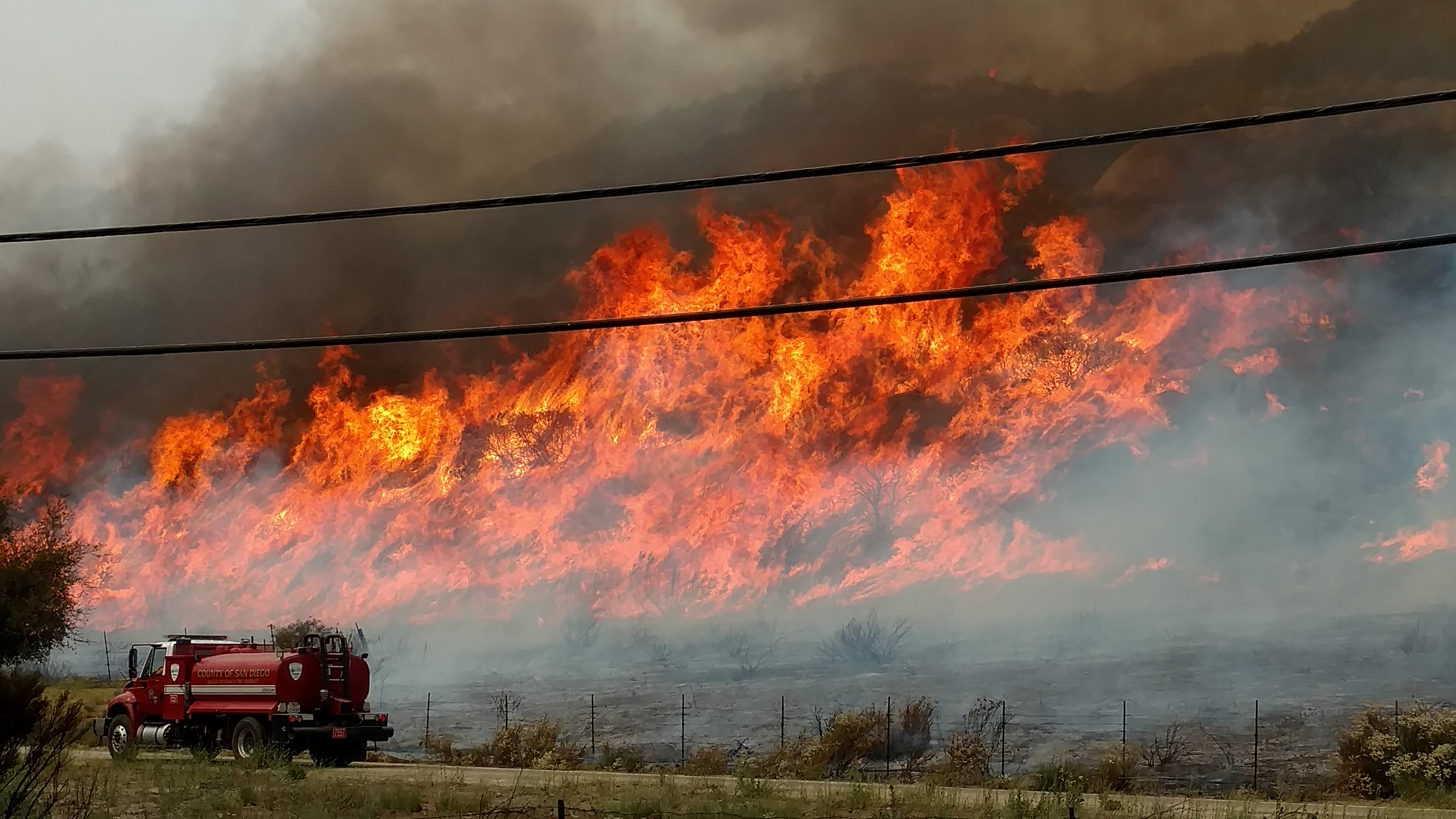
- Date: June 19, 2016 –; June 30, 2016
- Location: Potrero, San Diego County, California
- Coordinates: 32.599°N 116.597°W

Statistics
- Burned area: 7,609 acres (31 km^{2})

Impacts
- Deaths: 2 civilians
- Structures lost: 5 homes; 11 outbuildings

Map
- Location in Southern California

The Border Fire was a large wildfire that burned in Potrero, California, as part of the 2016 California wildfire season. Located in San Diego County, the fire was so named due to its proximity to the Mexico–United States border.

== Progression ==
The fire, which was first reported around 11:30 a.m. on Sunday, June 19, started along the United States-Mexican border between Highway 188 and Highway 94. Reported at 5 acres, the fire burned at a moderate rate of spread before rapidly exploding into 1,500 acres (610 ha) within a matter of hours due to gushy winds within the fire area. The fire then quickly jumped Highway 94 and moved northwest threatening multiple structures and prompting evacuations for the community of Potrero. Homes along Highway 94 between Emory Road and Plaskon Road were evacuated, along with residents in the community of Potrero. Initial reports detailed that 4 outbuilding has been destroyed. That evening, the fire was reported to be burning eastward with 5 percent containment.

By Monday morning, June 20, the fire was estimated to be 1,900 acres large and temperatures were expected to reach 107 degrees in the area that day, elevating the fires activity. By midday, authorities had issued additional mandatory evacuation orders for the nearby communities of Forest Gate, Star Ranch, Cowboy Ranch, Dog Patch and Canyon City because of "extreme fire behavior and activity." Evacuation advisory were also issued for areas near Campo and Buckman Springs." An American Red Cross shelter was set up at Los Coches Creek Middle School for evacuees displaced by the fire." As the day went on, the fire rapidly expanded to an estimated 7,500 acres with only a reported 10 percent containment. The fire is also believed to have been the cause of a power outage that affected several hundred people near the communities of Potrero, Dulzura and Campo, according to authorities.

During the early morning hours of Tuesday, June 21, the fire was downgraded to a more accurate 6,020 acres (2,440 ha) due to better mapping. Upwards of 1,550 firefighters from across Southern California were on scene battling the now three-day-old wildfire with more being requested. Reports suggested the fire was moving north and northeast, threatening parts of the Pacific Crest National Scenic Trail as well as its surrounding communities, Tuesday. The fire grew a mere 480 acres that day, expanding the burn area to 6,500 acres (2,600 ha).

A spot fire 1.2 miles northeast of the main fire had burned 40 acres as of early Wednesday morning, June 22. Five homes and eight other buildings were reported destroyed as the incident continued to grow to 6,700 acres (2,700 ha). However, as the fire reached 20 percent containment Wednesday evening, officials began lifting evacuation ordersfor the greater Potrero community.

Officials set backfires on Thursday, June 23, burning out much of the brush ahead of the Border Fire to keep it from spreading further. By 6 p.m. Thursday, all evacuation orders and warnings for residents in the affected areas had been lifted.

By Friday morning, June 24, the fire had been at 45 percent containment and was 7,609 acres (3,079 ha). As of 6 p.m. that Friday, Cal Fire officials reported that containment on the blaze had grown to 60 percent. Reports stated that the fire has destroyed a total of five homes and 11 other buildings over its six-day span. On Friday morning, Cal Fire officials said firefighters had been able to build stronger containment lines along the perimeter of the Border Fire, increasing the control.

On Sunday June 26, all evacuation orders were lifted as the fire reached 80% containment.

On Thursday June 30, the fire was deemed 100% contained with a total of 7,609 acres (3,079 ha) burned.

== Effects ==
Along with widespread evacuations the fire also caused power outages in over 1,000 homes and businesses in Potrero, Campo, and Dulzura, according to San Diego Gas & Electric.

On June 29 authorities announced that the bodies of two missing individuals had been located in the burn area. The two were believed to have been killed by the inferno.
