= Chimney Fire =

2016 wildfire in Southern California

- Part of the 2016 California wildfires
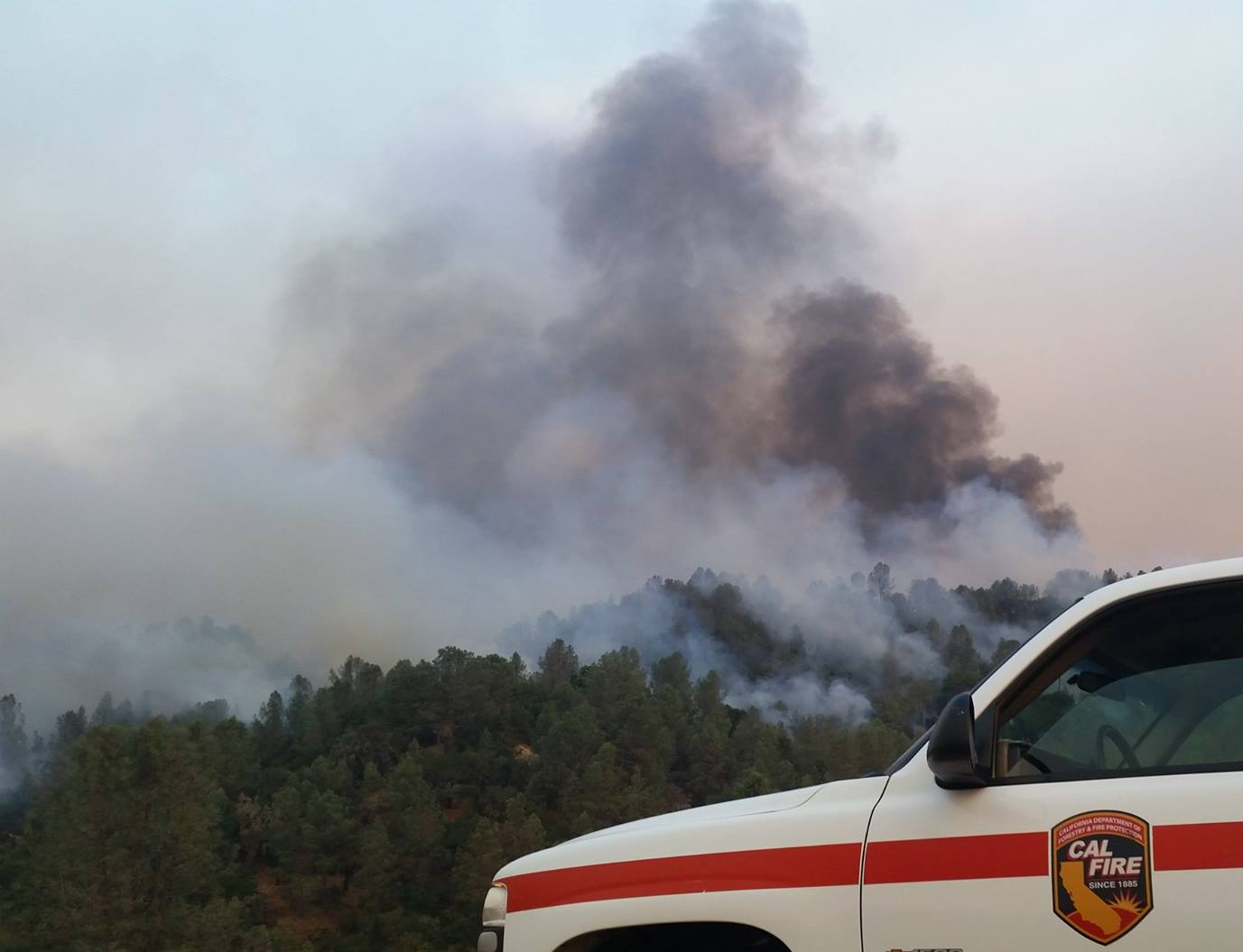
- Smoke rises from the Chimney Fire on August 14.
- Date: August 13, 2016 –; September 6, 2016
- Location: Santa Lucia Range, San Luis Obispo County, California
- Coordinates: 35.70595°N 120.98316°W

Statistics
- Burned area: 46,344 acres (188 km^{2})

Impacts
- Deaths: 0 deaths
- Injuries: 1 injury
- Structures destroyed: 70 destroyed; 8 damaged

Map
- Location in California

The Chimney Fire was a wildfire in the Santa Lucia Range, within San Luis Obispo County, California. The fire temporarily closed Hearst Castle to tourists and also forced the closure of Highway 1 along the scenic Big Sur coast for a time. By the time the fire was contained on September 6, 2016, it had burned 46,344 acres (188 km^{2}) acres of land.

== Timeline ==
The fire was first reported Saturday August 13 shortly after 4:00 p.m. Evacuations were ordered in the area of Running Deer Ranch, located on the south side of Lake Nacimiento.

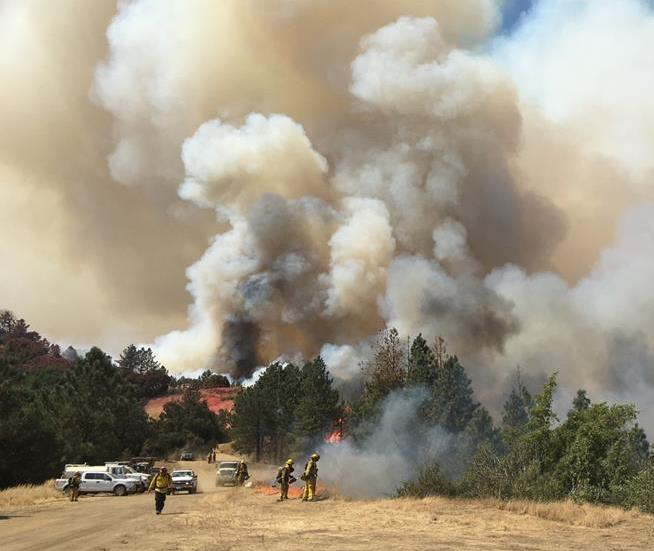
Chimney Fire burnout operations

On Sunday afternoon the 14th, officials announced that Highway 1 would be closed for at least 24 hours due to fire activity. Dry south-west winds and temperatures approaching 100 °F (38 °C) drove the fire.

By Monday morning the fire had grown to over 4,300 acres (17 km^{2}), including within the Los Padres National Forest. Officials from CAL FIRE also stated that at least 20 homes had been damaged or destroyed.

At 17,000 acres (69 km^{2}) on Saturday afternoon with 35% containment, the fire was within 2 miles (3.2 km) of Hearst Castle. Tours were cancelled as park staff prepared to move some of the massive art and antiques collection if necessary. No artwork was in any immediate danger, and did not have to be moved.

On August 26, thirteen days after the fire started, the fire neared being half contained, i.e., 49 residences and 21 other structures were destroyed, nearly 1900 other structures were threatened, 45,008 acres (182 km^{2}) had been burned, and it was 47% contained.

On August 31, the fire had burned 46,344 acres (187.55 km^{2}) and was 85% contained. All evacuation orders and road closures had been lifted by this point. Firefighting efforts had begun to slow, although the smoke in surrounding areas was still considerably thick by then.

On September 6, the fire was fully contained, having been ongoing for the previous 23 days. Over 70 buildings were destroyed and 8 buildings were damaged because of the fire, yet only one injury had occurred.
