= Bogart Fire =

2016 wildfire in Southern California

- Part of the 2016 California wildfires
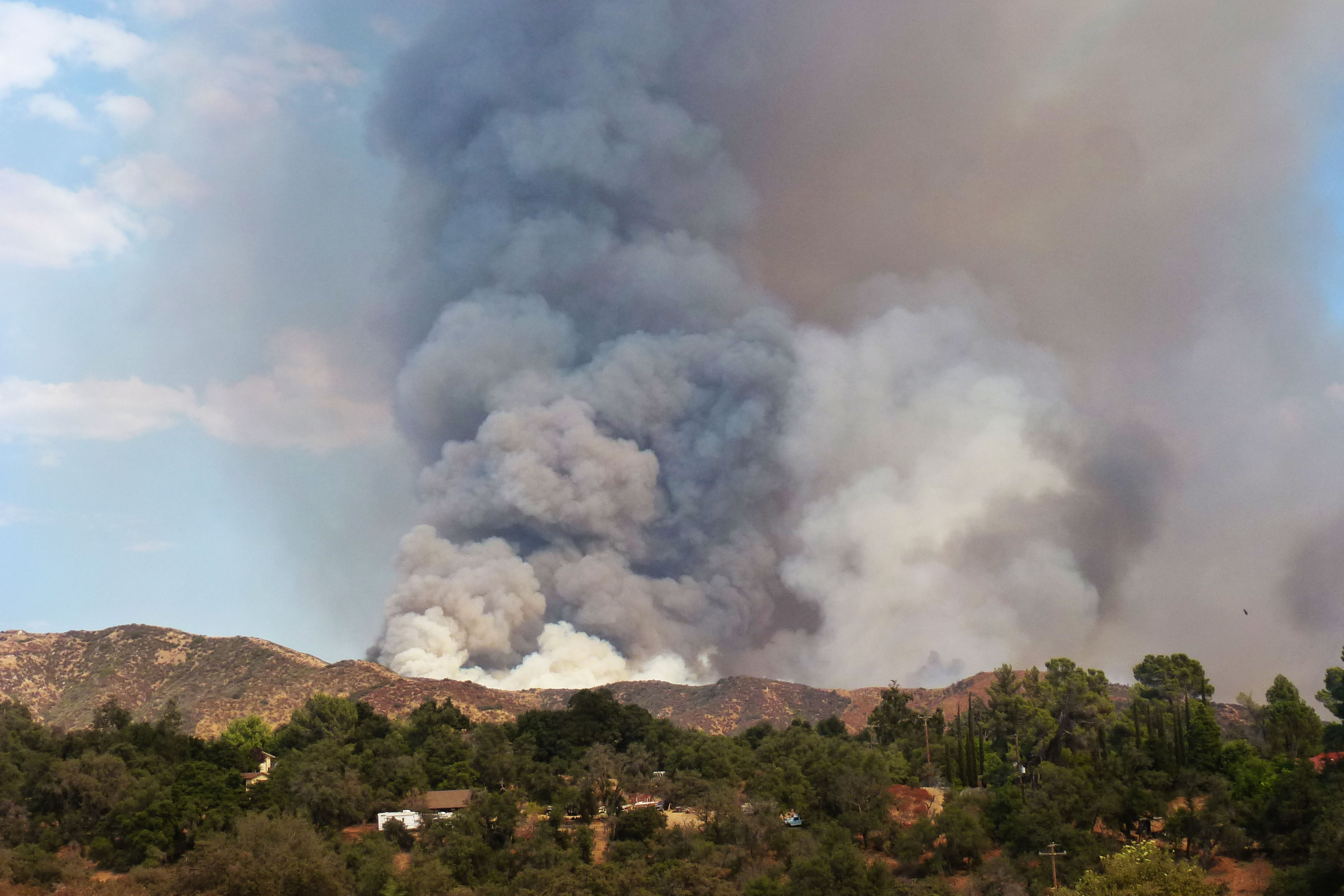
- Smoke billows from the Bogart fire as seen from Oak Glen Road
- Date: August 30, 2016 –; September 2, 2016
- Location: Cherry Valley, Riverside County, California
- Coordinates: 33.976676°N 116.954740°W

Statistics
- Burned area: 1,470 acres (6 km^{2})

Ignition
- Cause: Human related

Map
- Location of fire in Southern California

The Bogart Fire was a wildfire in the Bogart Park area of Cherry Valley in Riverside County, California. The fire broke out near Winesap Avenue and International Park Road just southwest of Bogart Park on August 30, 2016. By August 31, the fire was estimated at 1,300 acres.

== Events ==
The fire was first reported at 12:25 pm on August 30 at Bogart Park near Winesap Avenue and International Park Road. The fire soon forced the evacuation of 700 residents within the Highland Spring Village mobile home park and of residents in the Banning Bench area near Banning. 4 firefighters sustained minor injuries and one outbuilding was destroyed by the wildfire. In addition, more than 500 firefighters battled the fire.

By September 2, the fire was 100% contained at 1,470 acres in size.

== Cause ==
According to CALFIRE, the fire is believed to be caused by “juvenile activity” near Bogart Park in Beaumont.
