= Erskine Fire =

2016 wildfire in Central California

- Part of the 2016 California wildfires
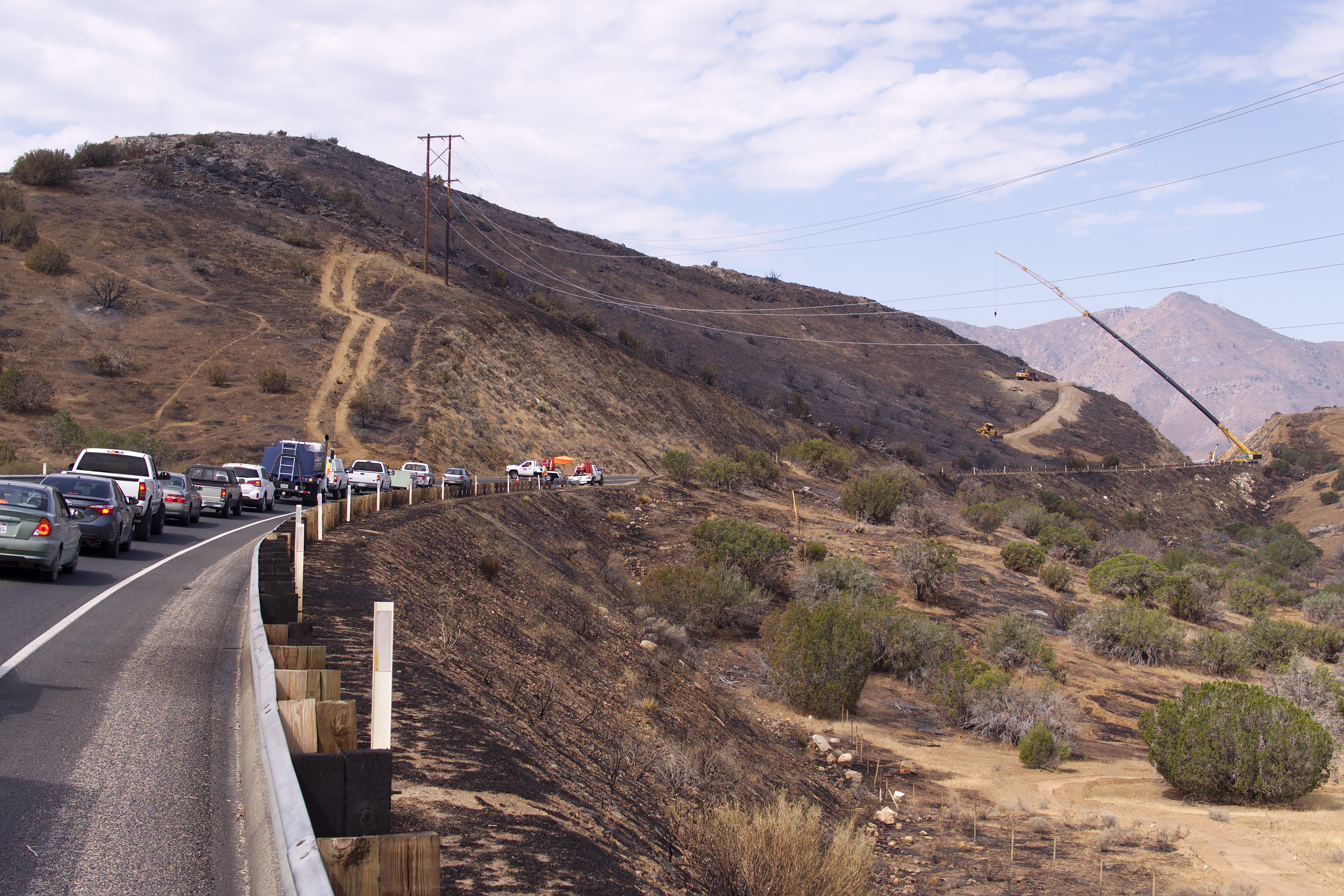
- Burned areas along partially re-opened SR 178 near South Lake, June 28
- Date: June 23, 2016 –; July 11, 2016
- Location: Lake Isabella, California
- Coordinates: 35.617°N 118.453°W

Statistics
- Burned area: 47,864 acres (19,370 ha; 75 sq mi; 194 km^{2})

Impacts
- Deaths: 2
- Structures lost: 309
- Cost: $23 million; (equivalent to about $29 million in 2024)

Ignition
- Cause: Worn wire running through a tree

Map
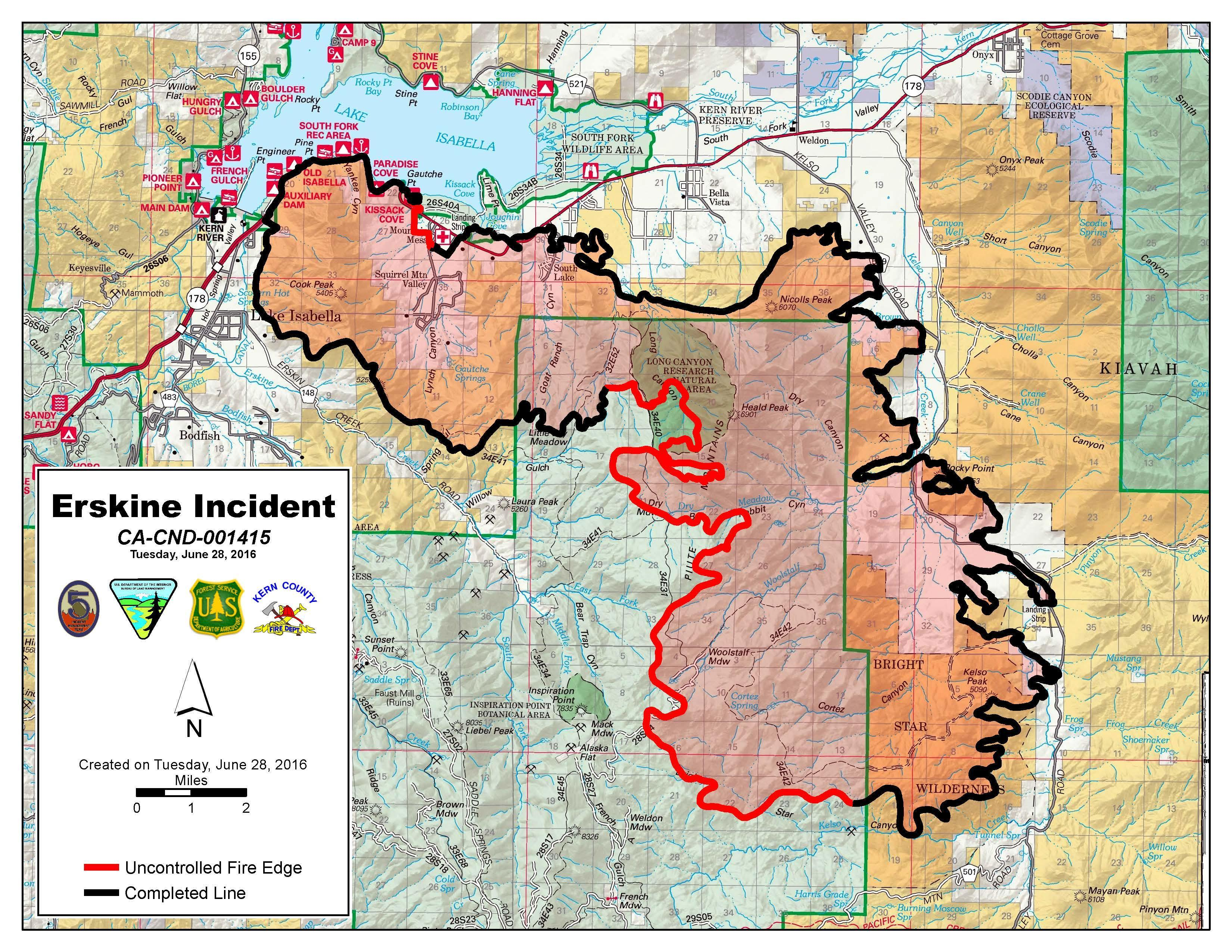
- Briefing map of the fire from June 28th.

The Erskine Fire was a wildfire in the Lake Isabella area of Kern County. It was the second-largest wildfire of the 2016 California wildfire season. It was also the first fire of the year to have fatalities and is the 15th most destructive fire in state history.

== Progression ==
The fire, which was first reported around 4:00 p.m. PST on June 23, quickly grew to over 8,000 acres (32 km^{2}) and destroyed over 100 structures, including at least 80 residences, in the first few hours.

By mid-day on June 24, the fire had grown to over 19,000 acres (77 km^{2}) and was still 0% contained. By 6:00pm that day, officials confirmed that the fire had grown to over 30,000 acres (120 km^{2}) with 5% contained. That evening, Governor Jerry Brown declared a state of emergency for Kern County.

On June 28, Kern County Fire Department confirmed that 257 homes had been destroyed by the fire.

On July 1, Two Red Cross Shelters were set up north of Lake Isabella.

On July 11, the fire was 100% contained. The cost of suppressing the fire came to $23 million, according to the National Interagency Fire Center.

== Effects ==
On June 24, officials confirmed that two people had been killed by the fast moving fire. Officials also stated that cadaver dogs were being used to search for possible additional victims. The deceased victims were an elderly couple who died while attempting to flee their home.

On June 25, a third set of remains was found, though the body had been burned so badly that it is unclear whether or not the remains belong to a human or an animal. On June 27, the Kern County Sheriff's Office confirmed that the remains belonged to an animal and not to a human.
