= Trailhead Fire =

2016 wildfire in Northern California

- Part of the 2016 California wildfires
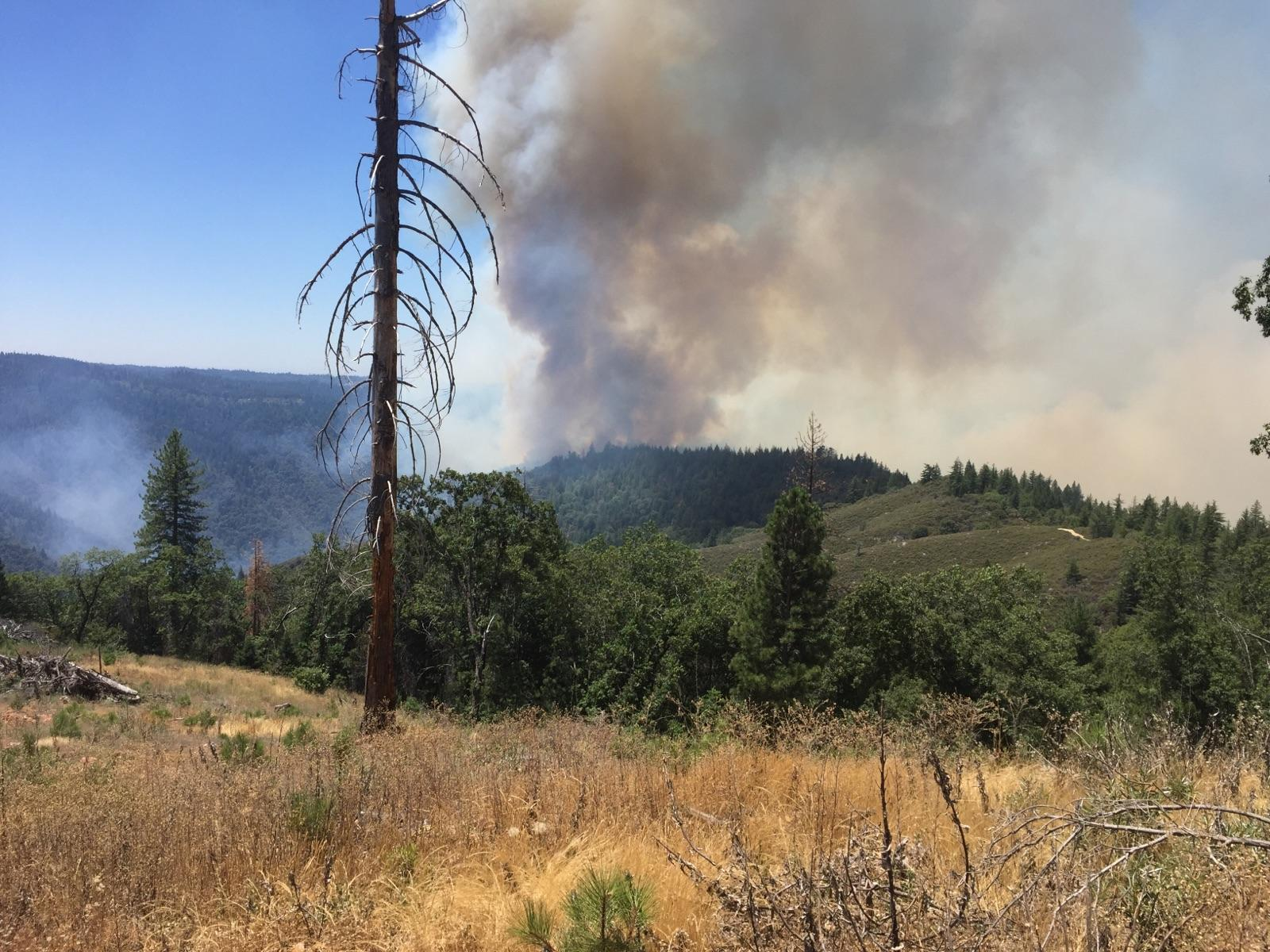
- Trailhead Fire: View of Cock Robin point from the East, June 29, 2016
- Date: June 28, 2016 –; July 18, 2016
- Location: Eldorado National Forest, Placer County & El Dorado County, California
- Coordinates: 38.969°N 120.854°W

Statistics
- Burned area: 5,646 acres (23 km^{2})

Ignition
- Cause: Under investigation

Map
- Location in Northern California

The Trailhead Fire was a wildfire burning in the Middle Fork American River canyon in both Placer County and El Dorado County, California. As of July 18, 2016 the fire has consumed 5,646 acres (22.85 km^{2}) and is 100% contained.

== Events ==
On Wednesday June 29, less than 24 hours after the fire was first reported, the fire had grown to over 1,000 acres (4.0 km^{2}) forcing widespread evacuations as over 2,500 structures were threatened. By Wednesday evening, the fire was only 12% contained and two evacuation centers had been established: one at Golden Sierra High School in Garden Valley for residents in El Dorado County, and a second at the Gold Country Fairgrounds in Auburn for residents in Placer County.

== See also ==
- 2016 California wildfires
