= Rey Fire =

2016 wildfire in Southern California

- Part of the 2016 California wildfires
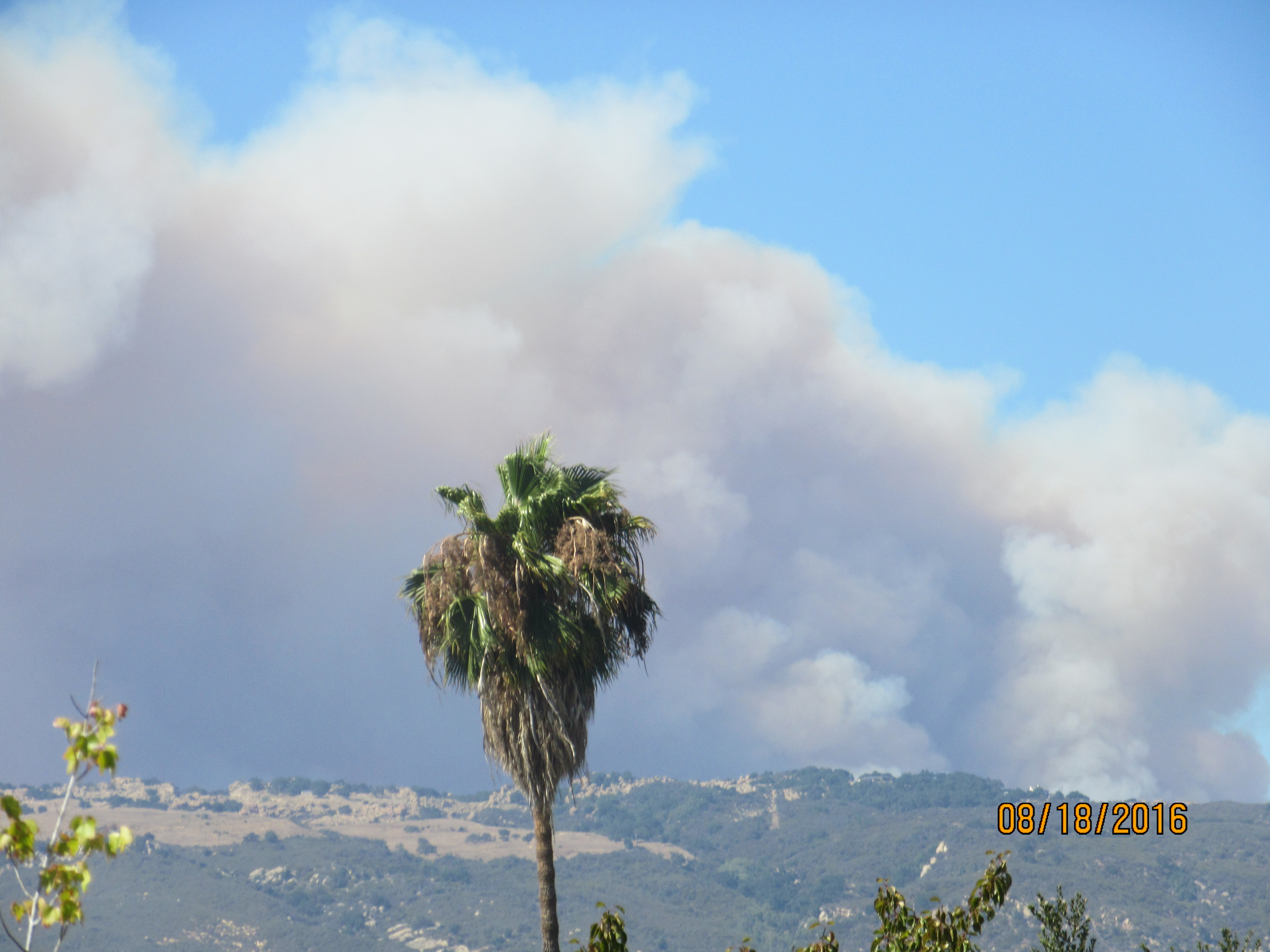
- Smoke from the Rey Fire rises into the sky on Thursday, August 18, 2016.
- Date: August 19, 2016 –; September 16, 2016
- Location: Santa Barbara County, California
- Coordinates: 34.546°N 119.805°W

Statistics
- Burned area: 32,606 acres (132 km^{2})

Impacts
- Injuries: 2

Map
- Location in Southern California

The Rey Fire was a wildfire that burned in the area southeast of Lake Cachuma in the range above the Santa Ynez River, Santa Barbara County, California, in 2016. By the time the fire was contained, it had burned 32,606 acres (131.95 km^{2}).

== The fire ==
The fire was first reported at 3:15 pm on Thursday August 18, 2016, and by Saturday morning had grown to over 13,224 acres (53.52 km^{2}), nearly quadrupling in size over night. About 300 people were evacuated from their campsites and residences, and on Friday officials let up to 5 groups at a time retrieve personal belongings from their campsites. As of Monday morning, about 1200 firefighters were working on containing the blaze, as well as 11 aircraft. As of Monday morning, the fire has exploded to 23,546 acres and has increased back to 20% containment in 4 days and 14 hours, since it started.

The National Weather Service reported on Saturday that the fire had produced a pyrocloud. This mass of hot air resembles a thunderstorm cloud that can collapse when the air cools down. The wind can manifest as strong gusts at the surface which can exacerbate the fire.

On Sunday night, August 28, the fire had charred 33,006 acres and was 54% contained, with very little, if not no growth overnight.

The acreage of the fire was decreased from 33,006 to 32,606 acres (131.95 km^{2}) and was at 96% containment on September 1.

On September 16, the fire was fully contained, having burned 32,606 acres (131.95 km^{2})

== See also ==
- 2016 California wildfires
