= San Gabriel Complex Fire =

2016 wildfire in Southern California

- Part of the 2016 California wildfires
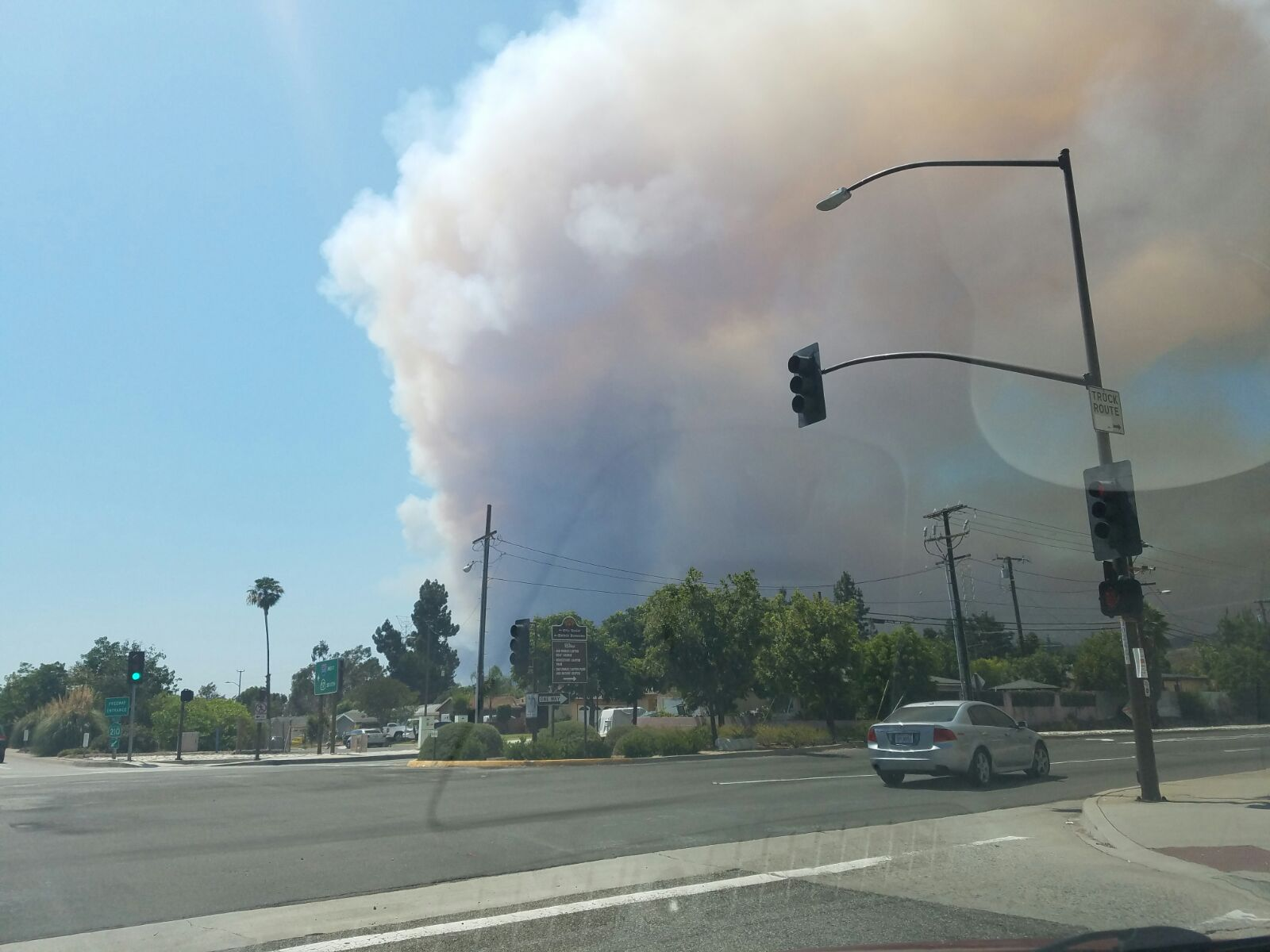
- Smoke rising from the Fish Fire approximately two hours after it started
- Date: June 20, 2016 –; July 23, 2016
- Location: Angeles National Forest, Los Angeles County, California
- Coordinates: 34.168°N 117.9°W

Statistics
- Burned area: 5,399 acres (21.85 km^{2}; 2,185 ha)

Impacts
- Deaths: 3 civilians

Ignition
- Cause: Vehicle Crash (Reservoir Fire); Under Investigation (Fish Fire)

Map
- Location in Los Angeles

The San Gabriel Complex Fire was a wildfire that burned in 2016 in the Angeles National Forest, Los Angeles County, California, United States. It was the combination of two separate wildfires: the Reservoir Fire and the Fish Fire, both of which ignited on June 20.

== Events ==
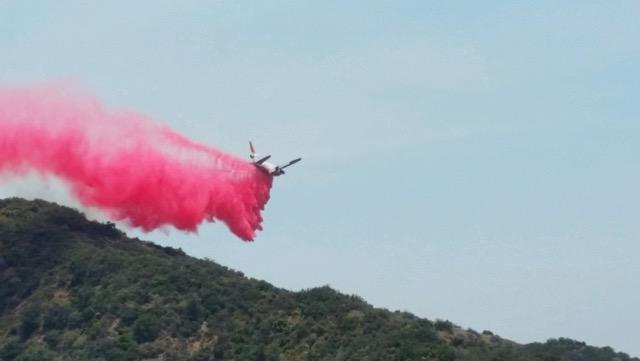
A DC-10 tanker drops fire retardant on the San Gabriel Complex Fire

Around 11:00 a.m. PST on June 20, the first wildfire, known as the Reservoir Fire, was reported in the San Gabriel Mountains along Highway 39 near the Morris Reservoir. As the flames quickly spread to over 1,500 acres (6.1 km^{2}), the Azusa Police Department issued mandatory evacuations for the neighborhoods of Rainbow Ranch and Mountain Cove. Over an hour later, a second wildfire erupted in Fish Canyon. Dubbed the Fish Fire, the blaze exploded up and across the canyons above Duarte, burning 1,000 acres within just two hours of burning. By 9:00 p.m. PST, the Fish Fire had spread to over 3,000 acres (12 km^{2}).

By June 21, the fires had merged and were officially declared the San Gabriel Complex Fire. Additionally, FEMA issued a statement that the fire posed enough of a threat that it was a major disaster, thus qualifying the incident for federal assistance.

== Effects ==
The fire caused widespread power outages in Azusa Canyon which resulted in smaller water systems being placed under a precautionary boil-water advisory by the Los Angeles County Public Health Department.

The communities of Mountain Cove in Azusa, Rainbow Ranch and portions of Duarte were put under a mandatory evacuation order that lasted several days as the fires burned.

Weeks after the fires broke out, two charred bodies were found in the burn area of the San Gabriel Complex incident. 31-year-old Carlos Perez and 16-year-old Jonathan Pardo are believed to have burned to death while hiking the foothills on the day the fires broke out.

== Cause ==
On June 20, the deputy chief of the Los Angeles County Fire Department stated that the Reservoir Fire had been caused by a fatal vehicle accident near the Morris Reservoir. The fire had been ignited when a vehicle veered off Highway 39 and then colliding with the descending mountainside alongside the highway. The driver, Michael Spengler, died at the scene as a result of multiple blunt force and thermal injuries relating to the crash and subsequent fire, according to the Los Angeles County Department of Medical Examiner-Coroner website.

The cause of the Fish Fire remains under investigation.

== Long Term Consequences ==
The Fish Canyon Trail and Fish Canyon Falls were involved in the Fish Fire, with 95% of the trail falling within the burn area. A small percentage of the trail is on private corporate property (Vulcan Mining / Materials) and a small percentage of the trail is administered by the United States Forest Service; however, most of the property falls under the administration of the City of Duarte.

A survey of the damage by the City of Duarte, the U. S. Forest Service, and the San Gabriel Mountains Trailbuilders along with other representatives from various agencies was conducted, and the assessment was that the damage was heavy enough to warrant the closure of the hiking trail with no recommendation for efforts to repair the historic trail. Ultimately, the City of Duarte holds the primary decision on whether to repair the damaged trail resulting from the Complex Fire, but as of September 2018, the assessment is that the trail is defunct and will not be repaired.
