= Cold Fire (wildfire) =

2016 wildfire in Northern California

Cold Fire (2016)
- Part of the 2016 California wildfires
- Date: August 2, 2016 –; August 11, 2016
- Location: Vaca Mountains, Yolo County, California
- Coordinates: 38.52513°N 122.06788°W

Statistics
- Burned area: 5,371 acres (2,174 ha)

Impacts
- Structures lost: 2
- Cost: $100,000

Ignition
- Cause: Under investigation

Map
- Location in California

The Cold Fire was a wildfire that started on August 2, 2016, in the Vaca Mountains, near Lake Berryessa and just west of the city of Winters, in Yolo County, northern California. The fire was contained by 6 PM on August 11 after burning a total of 5,371 acres (21.74 km^{2}), including two buildings, causing an estimated $100,000 in damage.

== Events ==
The fire was first reported at 4:36 pm on August 2 near Highway 128 west of Pleasants Valley Road. By sundown mandatory evacuations were ordered for Canyon Creek Campground and Golden Bear Estates. The following day, less than 24 hours after the fire was first reported, it had grown to over 4,000 acres (16 km^{2}).

A Red Cross shelter was briefly setup in Winters but was closed due to lack of use.

By August 4, the third day, the fire had grown to 4,700 acres (19 km^{2}), with 903 fire personnel members on the ground and the evacuation order for Golden Bear Estates had been lifted.

By August 6, the fourth day, the fire had grown to 5,385 acres (21.79 km^{2}) with 1,625 fire personnel members on the ground and Highway 128 was reopened to traffic and Thompson Valley Road at Highway 128 being closed.

The fire was contained by 6 PM on August 11. The Cold Fire caused an estimated $100,000 in damages. In total, 5,731 acres (23.19 km^{2}) acres had been burned and two hunting cabins had been destroyed. The cause of the fire remains under investigation.
