= WorldView-4 =

American Earth observation satellite

- Names: GeoEye-2
- Mission type: Earth observation
- Operator: DigitalGlobe
- COSPAR ID: 2016-067A
- SATCAT no.: 41848
- Website: https://www.maxar.com/
- Mission duration: 7 years (planned); 2 years, 1 month and 27 days (achieved)

Spacecraft properties
- Bus: LM-900
- Manufacturer: Lockheed Martin Space Systems
- Launch mass: 2,485 kg (5,478 lb)
- Dimensions: 7.9 × 5.3 m (26 × 17 ft)

Start of mission
- Launch date: 11 November 2016, 18:30:33 UTC
- Rocket: Atlas V 401 (AV-062)
- Launch site: Vandenberg, SLC-3E
- Contractor: United Launch Alliance
- Entered service: 26 November 2016

End of mission
- Disposal: Declared unrecoverable
- Declared: 7 January 2019
- Decay date: 30 November 2021

Orbital parameters
- Reference system: Geocentric orbit
- Regime: Sun-synchronous orbit
- Perigee altitude: 609.95 km (379.01 mi)
- Apogee altitude: 613.28 km (381.07 mi)
- Inclination: 97.98°
- Period: 96.93 minutes
- Repeat interval: 3 days

Main telescope
- Name: GeoEye Imaging System-2
- Diameter: 1.1 m (3 ft 7 in)
- Wavelengths: Panchromatic: 450–800 nm Multispectral: 450–920 nm
- Resolution: Panchromatic: 31 cm (12 in); Multispectral: 124 cm (49 in)

WorldView-4, previously known as GeoEye-2, was a third generation commercial Earth observation satellite launched on 11 November 2016, at 18:30:33 UTC. The spacecraft was operated by DigitalGlobe. With a maximum resolution of 31 cm (12 in), WorldView-4 provided similar imagery as WorldView-3, the highest resolution commercially available at the time of its launch.

The spacecraft suffered a failure in one of its control moment gyroscopes in January 2019, and operations were unable to be recovered. It reentered over New Zealand on 30 November 2021.

== History ==
Work on GeoEye-2 began in October 2007 when commercial imagery company GeoEye selected ITT Corporation to begin work on long lead-time items for the satellite camera system. In March 2010, an initial contract for construction of the spacecraft was awarded to Lockheed Martin Space Systems, which previously built the Ikonos imaging satellite. At the time, GeoEye-2 was planned for launch in late 2012. The spacecraft's preliminary design review was completed in November 2010, while its critical design review (CDR) was completed in June 2011.

Lockheed Martin issued a contract to ITT Corporation in August 2010 to continue work on the camera system, and the company announced the completion of the system's critical design review on 1 March 2011. The system was delivered to Lockheed Martin in April 2012, and was mated to the satellite bus the following month.

DigitalGlobe agreed to purchase GeoEye in July 2012, and finalized the merger in January 2013. At the time, each company had a satellite being prepared for launch: WorldView-3 and GeoEye-2. Because WorldView-3 offered multiple short-wavelength infrared channels in addition to the standard panchromatic and multiwavelength channels, the company chose to proceed with its launch and to place GeoEye-2 into storage.

In July 2014, DigitalGlobe announced that GeoEye-2 had been renamed to WorldView-4 to better match the company's branding, and that, due to a projected increase in product demand, the spacecraft's launch had been scheduled for mid-2016. The total cost of the spacecraft, including insurance and launch, is estimated at US$835 million.

The first public image from WorldView-4 was taken on 26 November 2016 and released on 2 December 2016.

In January 2019, WorldView-4 was announced to have suffered a failure in one of its control moment gyroscopes, and was considered no longer usable. WorldView-4 was insured against satellite failure, and in spring 2019 the company owning the satellite, Maxar Technologies, which had acquired DigitalGlobe in 2017, announced that they had received the full US$183 million insurance payment.

== Launch ==
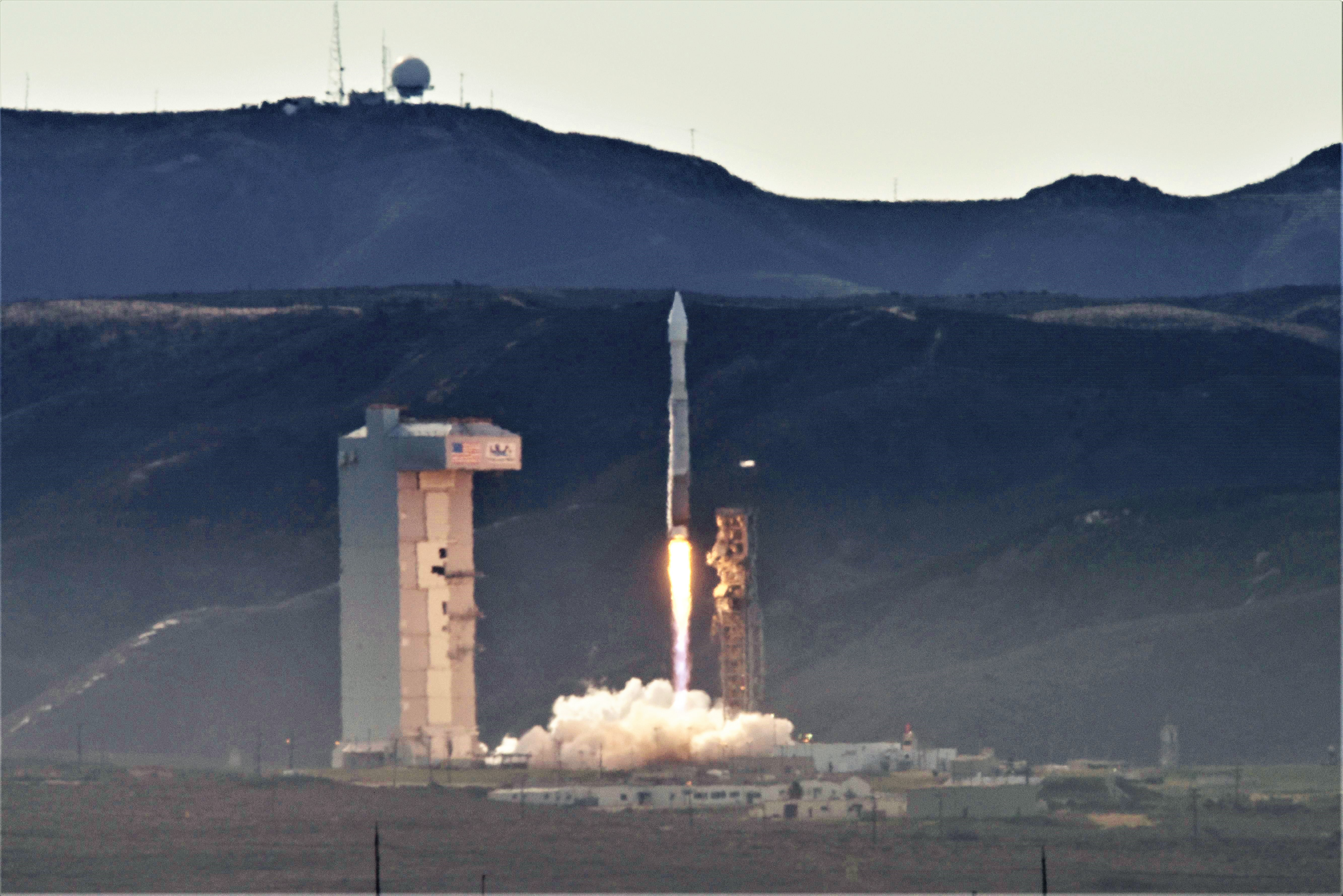
WorldView-4 launches aboard an Atlas V launch vehicle

WorldView-4 was launched on 11 November 2016 at 18:30:33 UTC from Vandenberg Air Force Base's Space Launch Complex 3E aboard an Atlas V launch vehicle. The launch vehicle was in the 401 configuration with serial number AV-062, and was provided and administered by United Launch Alliance. This was the same launch vehicle that had been scheduled to launch the InSight Mars lander, which was delayed until 2018. The launch vehicle had been erected at the Vandenberg launch pad on 16 December 2015 for the InSight mission; after the WorldView-4 mission took the place of InSight, the launch vehicle was allowed to remain vertical at the pad protected by its mobile service tower. The WorldView-4 payload was fixed atop the rocket during the second week of September 2016.

Originally scheduled for launch on 29 June 2016, the flight was rescheduled to 15 September 2016 and then to 16 September 2016. During countdown on 16 September 2016, the launch was scrubbed due to a liquid hydrogen leak in the ground support equipment resulting in an ice ball forming on an umbilical cable. The launch was rescheduled for 18 September 2016 to allow for the replacement of a fill-and-drain valve, determined to be the cause of the leak.

The Canyon Fire, a wildfire that burned over 5,157 ha (12,742 acres) on the southern section of Vandenberg, resulted in a further launch delay so that the base could "concentrate [their] resources on the situation at hand". As a result of scheduling availability on the Western Range, the flight was rescheduled for 26 September 2016. Continued efforts in fighting the Canyon Fire caused an indeterminate delay of the launch to no earlier than October 2016. Four additional fires of varying sizes broke out between 22 and 27 September 2016; while all were contained by the end of the 27th, base commander John Moss stated that until all facilities and instrumentation could be surveyed, no preliminary launch date could be determined.

Repairs were made to the base's infrastructure affected by the wildfire, including power and communications, and the launch date was reset to 6 November 2016. The date was later pushed back to 11 November 2016 as ULA worked to fix minor Atlas V booster issues found during preparations.

== Instrument ==
The spacecraft's telescope was called the GeoEye Imaging System-2, also known as SpaceView 110, which was designed and built by ITT Corporation (later ITT Exelis and Harris Corporation). The telescope mirror was 1.1 m (3 ft 7 in) in diameter. It provided panchromatic images at a highest resolution of 31 cm/px between 450 and 800 nanometres, and multispectral images at 124 cm/px in blue, green, red and near-infrared channels (450–510 nm, 510–580 nm, 655–690 nm and 780–920 nm, respectively).
