= Canyon Fire (2016) =

2016 wildfire in Southern California

- Part of the 2016 California wildfires
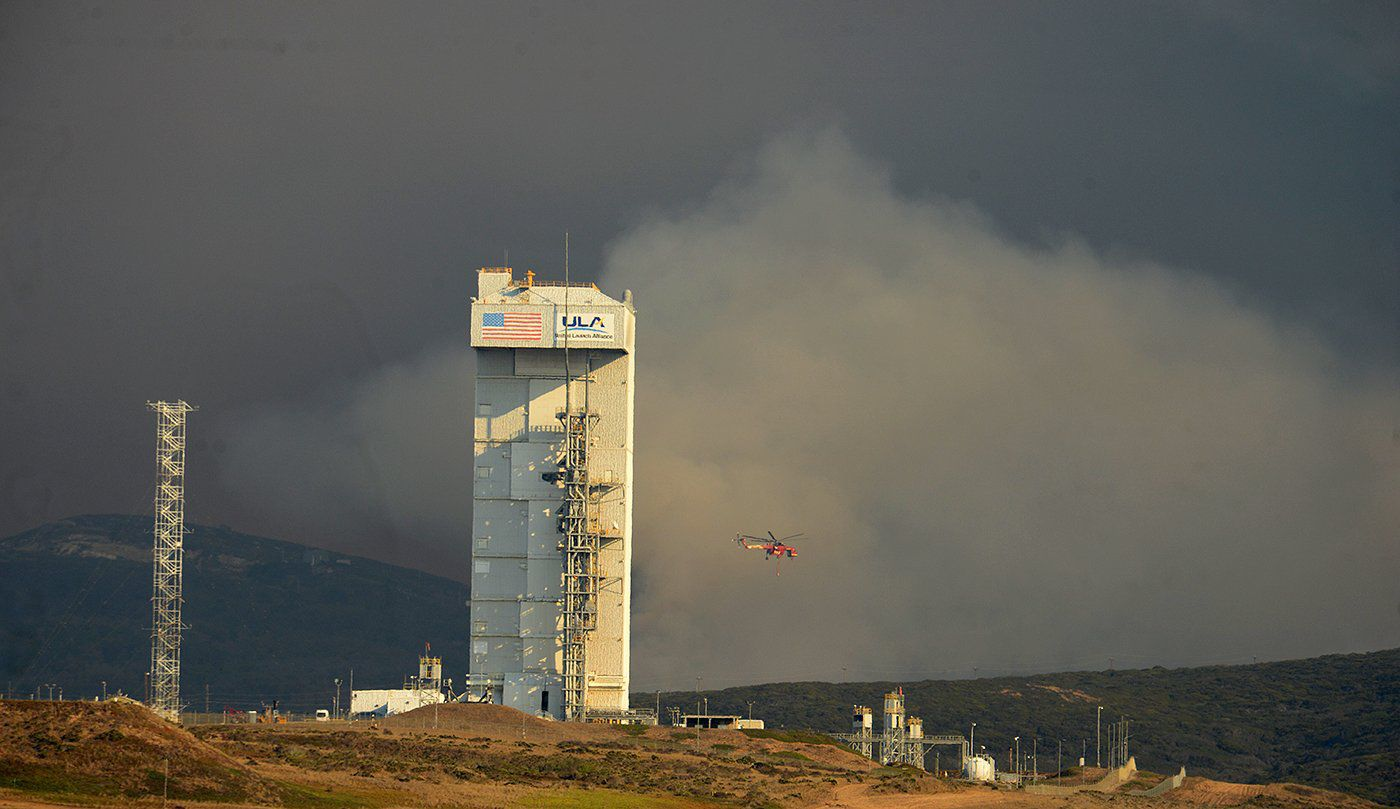
- Smoke rises from the Canyon Fire with Launch Complex 3 in the foreground.
- Date: September 17, 2016 –; September 24, 2016
- Location: Vandenberg Air Force Base, Santa Barbara County, California
- Coordinates: 34.612°N 120.568°W

Statistics
- Burned area: 12,742 acres (51.6 km^{2})

Impacts
- Deaths: 1
- Cost: $12 million

Map
- Location in Southern California

The Canyon Fire was a wildfire that burned on Vandenberg Space Force Base in Santa Barbara County, California during September 2016. By the time the fire was contained on September 24, it had burned 12,742 acres (51.6 km^{2}) of land.

== Progression ==
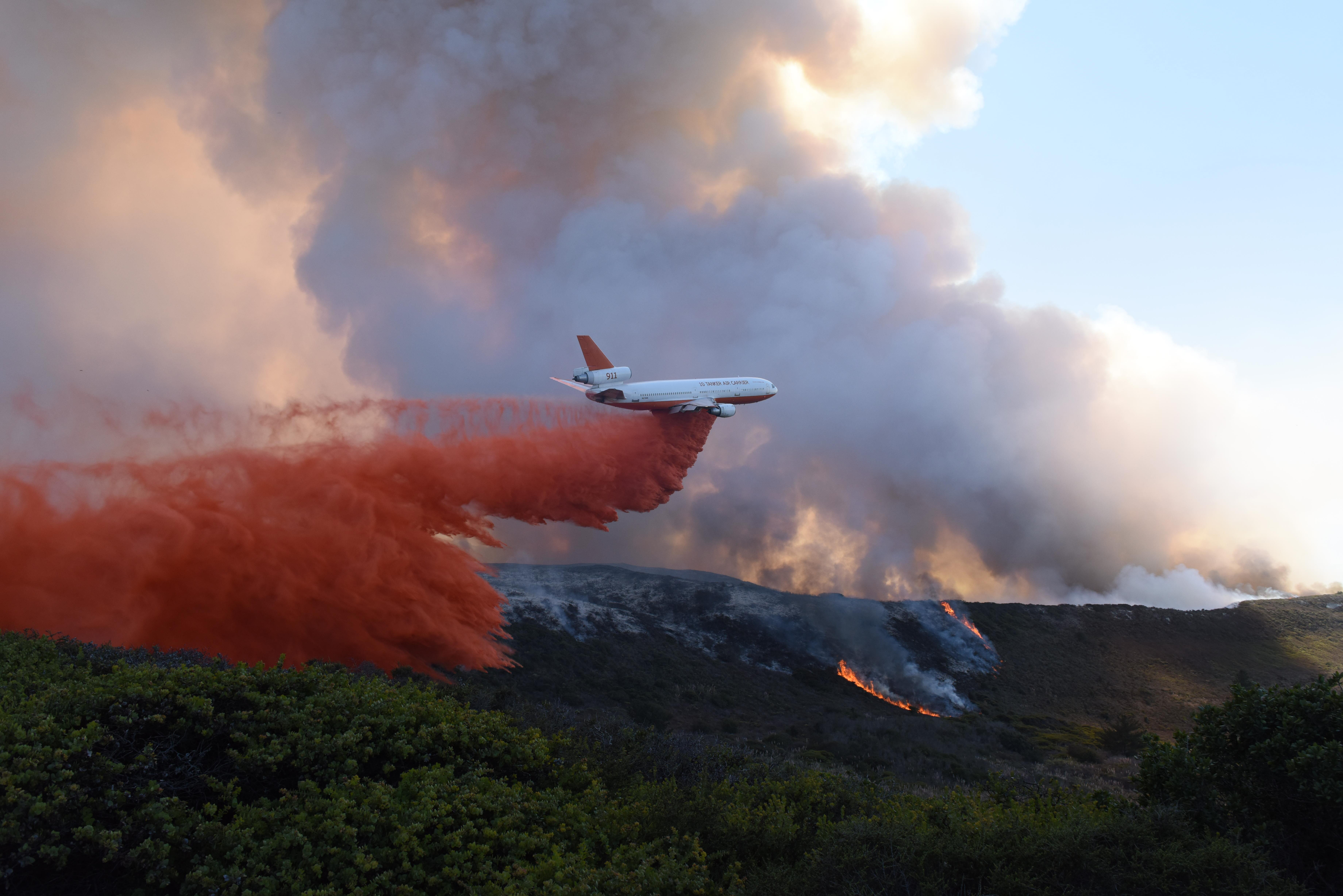
A DC-10 Very Large Air Tanker (VLAT) drops retardant on the Canyon Fire

The fire broke out September 17 and quickly grew to over 500 acres (2.0 km^{2}). Due to the location of the fire, burning in a remote canyon on the southern half of the base, access was difficult for fire crews. On September 18 the fire jumped to over 2,200 acres (8.9 km^{2}) prompting evacuation warnings for homes on San Miguelito Canyon south of Lompoc and east of the base. By mid-afternoon on September 19 the fire had grown to over 4,528 acres (18.3 km^{2}) and with no containment was continuing to burn at a "slow to moderate speed".

During the fire, base officials warned fighterfighters about unexploded ordnance possibly located on the grounds. By the morning of September 20, the fire had been estimated at 10,542 acres (42.7 km^{2}) in size with only 18% of the fire contained.

On September 21, a Ventura County OES water tender assigned to the fire crashed on Highway 246 just outside Lompoc, killing one firefighter and injuring another. The deceased identified as engineer Ryan Osler.

The fire was fully contained on September 24 after burning 12,742 acres (51.6 km^{2}).

== Effects ==
The launch of a United Launch Alliance Atlas V carrying the WorldView-4 earth observation satellite, originally scheduled for September 18, was delayed as the firecrews fought the Canyon Fire. While all fires at Vandenberg were contained by September 27, facilities and instrumentation needed to be surveyed for damage and, due to the delays, the launch did not occur until November 11, 2016.

The fire also caused widespread power outages in multiple facilities on the base including at least one fire station which had to operate on generator power.

== See also ==
- 2016 California wildfires
