= 2016 California wildfires =

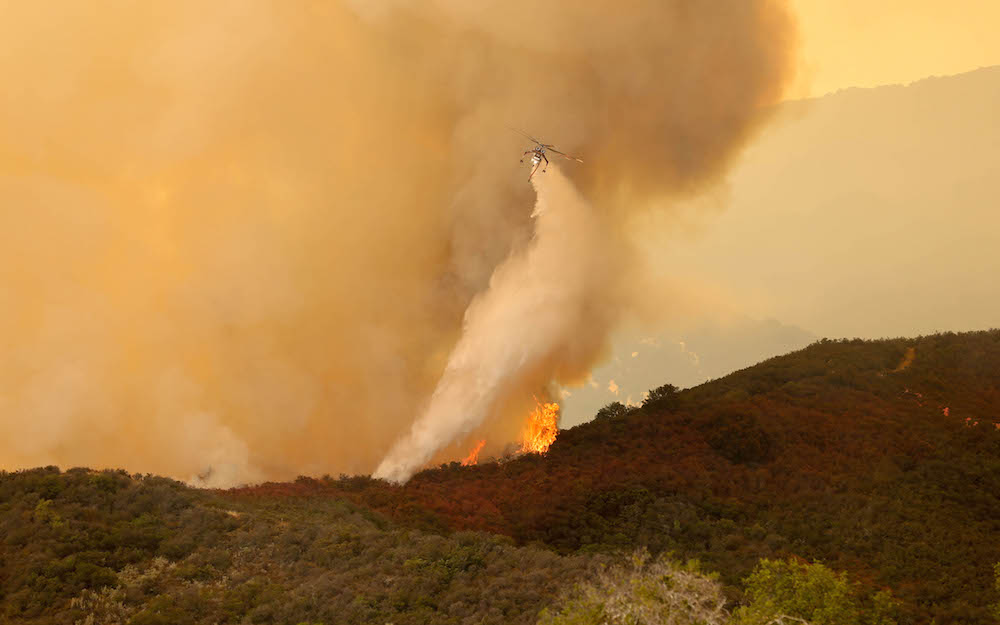
- A Skycrane makes a drop on the Sherpa Fire in June.

Statistics
- Total fires: 7,349
- Total area: 669,534 acres (2,709.51 km^{2})

Impacts
- Deaths: 6 civilians killed, 2 firefighters killed
- Injuries: Unknown
- Cost: >$480.3 million (2016 USD)

Map
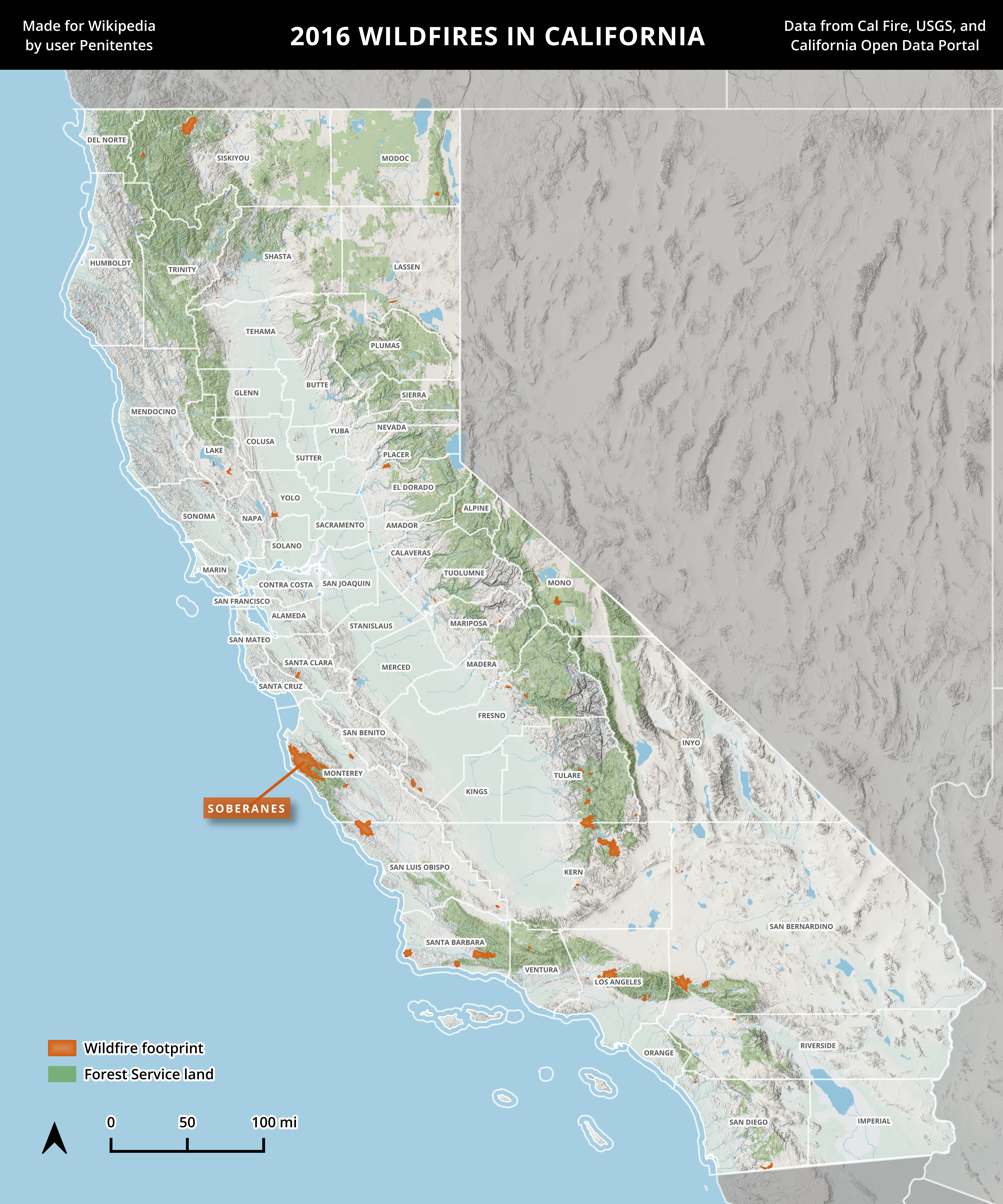
- A map of wildfires in California in 2016, using Cal Fire data

In 2016, a total of 7,349 fires had burned an area 669,534 acres (2,709.51 km^{2}) in California, according to the California Department of Forestry and Fire Protection.

Climatologists had predicted an extreme version of El Niño, known as a super El Niño, to occur during the winter of 2015–16. Although the Pacific Ocean’s warming water had been expected to bring strong storms to parts of the southwestern United States, actual precipitation totals generally underperformed those expectations. Early in 2016, the National Interagency Fire Center predicted that an increased risk of fires in states such as California.

== Background ==
The timing of "fire season" in California is variable, depending on the amount of prior winter and spring precipitation, the frequency and severity of weather such as heat waves and wind events, and moisture content in vegetation. Northern California typically sees wildfire activity between late spring and early fall, peaking in the summer with hotter and drier conditions. Occasional cold frontal passages can bring wind and lightning. The timing of fire season in Southern California is similar, peaking between late spring and fall. The severity and duration of peak activity in either part of the state is modulated in part by weather events: downslope/offshore wind events can lead to critical fire weather, while onshore flow and Pacific weather systems can bring conditions that hamper wildfire growth.

== Events ==
In June, the United States Forest Service estimated that over 26 million trees trees has died in the Sierra Nevada Mountains, in part due to droughts, higher temperatures, and insect activity.

On August 15, the National Interagency Fire Center reported that California's wildfires were some of the strongest on the West Coast. A day later, on August 16, San Bernardino County announced that nearly 85,000 people were evacuated because of the Blue Cut Fire near Cajon Pass. Authorities arrested a 40-year-old man in connection to the Clayton Fire, and charged him with 17 counts of arson.

== List of wildfires ==
Below is a list of all fires that exceeded 1,000 acres (400 ha) during the 2016 California wildfire season, as well as the fires that caused significant damage. The information is taken from CAL FIRE's list of large fires, and other sources where indicated.

Name	County	Acres	Start date	Containment Date (Note: Containment means that fire crews have established and secured control lines around the fire's perimeter. These lines are artificial barriers, like trenches or cleared vegetation, designed to stop the fire's spread, or natural barriers like rivers. Containment reflects progress in managing the fire but does not necessarily mean the fire is starved of fuel, under control, or put out.)	Notes	Ref
Roberts	San Luis Obispo	3,712	May 18, 2016	May 20, 2016	Burned on Camp Roberts.	
Metz	Monterey	3,876	May 22, 2016	May 25, 2016		
Coleman	Monterey	2,520	June 4, 2016	June 17, 2016	Burned on Fort Hunter Liggett.	
Pony	Siskiyou	2,860	June 7, 2016	June 30, 2016		
Sherpa	Santa Barbara	7,474	June 15, 2016	July 12, 2016		
Border	San Diego	7,609	June 19, 2016	June 30, 2016	2 fatalities, 5 homes and 11 outbuildings destroyed	
Pine	Ventura	2,304	June 19, 2016	July 17, 2016		
San Gabriel Complex	Los Angeles	5,399	June 20, 2016	July 23, 2016	Reservoir Fire burned 1,146 acres; Fish Fire burned 4,253 acres	
Erskine	Kern	48,019	June 23, 2016	July 12, 2016	2 fatalities, 285 homes destroyed, 12 damaged	
Trailhead	Placer	5,646	June 28, 2016	July 18, 2016		
Deer	Kern	1,785	July 1, 2016	July 11, 2016		
Curry	Fresno	2,944	July 1, 2016	July 5, 2016		
Sage	Los Angeles	1,109	July 9, 2016	July 16, 2016		
Roblar	San Diego	1,245	July 21, 2016	July 30, 2016	Burned on Camp Pendleton.	
Sand	Los Angeles	41,432	July 22, 2016	August 3, 2016	2 fatalities, 18 homes destroyed, 4 damaged	
Soberanes	Monterey	132,100	July 22, 2016	October 12, 2016	1 fatality, 3 injuries, 57 homes and 11 outbuildings destroyed.	
Goose	Fresno	2,241	July 30, 2016	August 9, 2016	4 homes, 5 outbuildings destroyed	
Cold	Yolo	5,731	August 2, 2016	August 12, 2016	2 outbuildings destroyed	
Pilot	San Bernardino	8,110	August 7, 2016	August 16, 2016		
Mineral	Fresno	7,050	August 9, 2016	August 18, 2016	2 structures destroyed	
Chimney	San Luis Obispo	46,344	August 13, 2016	September 6, 2016	48 structures destroyed	
Clayton	Lake	3,929	August 13, 2016	August 26, 2016	300 buildings destroyed	
Blue Cut	San Bernardino	36,274	August 16, 2016	August 23, 2016	105 homes, 213 outbuildings destroyed	
Cedar	Kern	29,322	August 16, 2016	September 30, 2016		
Rey	Santa Barbara	32,606	August 18, 2016	September 16, 2016		
Gap	Siskiyou	33,867	August 27, 2016	September 17, 2016		
Bogart	Riverside	1,470	August 30, 2016	September 2, 2016	1 outbuilding destroyed	
Willard	Lassen	2,575	September 11, 2016	September 22, 2016	5 structures destroyed	
Owens River	Mono	5,443	September 17, 2016	October 15, 2016		
Canyon	Santa Barbara	12,518	September 17, 2016	September 24, 2016	1 firefighter killed in crash. Burned on Vandenberg Space Force Base.	
Sawmill	Sonoma	1,547	September 25, 2016	September 29, 2016		
Marshes	Tuolumne	1,080	September 26, 2016	October 4, 2016	Burned just north of the Don Pedro Reservoir in the Stanislaus National Forest. Approximately 30 homes were evacuated and two minor injuries were reported. The fire briefly threatened the Hetch Hetchy Regional Water System headquarters, but normal water operations continued throughout the fire. The fire was started by a vehicle parked in dry grass along Marshes Flat Road.	
Loma	Santa Clara	4,474	September 26, 2016	October 12, 2016	28 structures destroyed	

== See also ==
- List of California wildfires
- 2005 Labor Day brush fire
- 2016 Fort McMurray Wildfire
- 2014 California wildfires
  - May 2014 San Diego County wildfires
