= Clayton Fire =

2016 wildfire in Northern California

- Part of the 2016 California wildfires
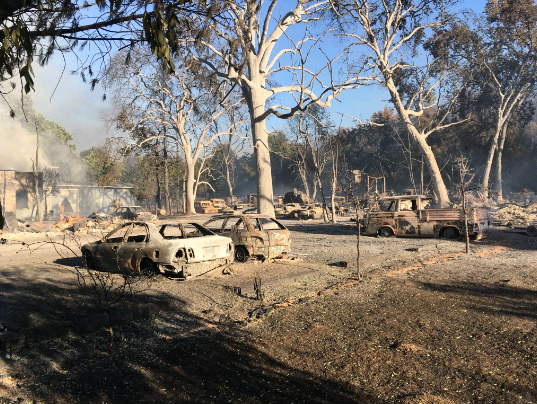
- The burned out remnants of Dave Johnson's Auto, as seen on Sunday, August 14.
- Date: August 13, 2016 –; August 26, 2016
- Location: Lower Lake California
- Coordinates: 38°53′51″N 122°36′24″W

Statistics
- Burned area: 3,929 acres (16 km^{2})

Impacts
- Structures destroyed: 300

Ignition
- Cause: Arson
- Perpetrator: Damin Pashilk

Map
- Location in California

The Clayton Fire was a wildfire that started on August 13, 2016 just south of Lower Lake in Lake County, California. The fire burned a total of 3,929 acres (15.90 km^{2}) and destroyed 300 buildings, before it was fully contained on August 26. Damin Pashilk, a construction worker from Clearlake was arrested and facing 17 counts of arson related to the Clayton Fire and other fires.

== Events ==
The fire was first reported at 6:03 pm on August 13 near Highway 29 and Clayton Creek Road. By August 14, the second day, 10 homes had been destroyed and up to 6,000 people had been evacuated from Lower Lake and Clearlake, including St. Helena Hospital Clearlake. An evacuation center was opened at Highlands Senior Center and was evacuated the following day.

By August 15, the third day, 5 percent of the fire had been contained, burning a total of 3,000 acres (12 km^{2}), 175 buildings, including the offices of a Habitat for Humanity affiliate, had been destroyed and 1,044 fire personnel were on the ground. Road closures were announced throughout the area, including Clayton Creek Road at Highway 29, Morgan Valley Road, North Spruce Grove Road at Spruce Grove Road, and Jerusalem Grade South Spruce Grove Road. State Route 53 at Highway 29 is closed. New evacuation centers were opened at Twin Pine Casino, Kelseyville High School, and the Seventh-day Adventist Church in Lakeport.

As of August 16, the fourth day, 1,664 fire personnel were on the ground and 20 percent of the fire had been contained. It was reported, at the time, as burning a total of 4,000 acres (16 km^{2}). Additionally, the Clearlake area of the Avenues and neighborhoods from Polk Avenue to Cache Creek, east of Highway 53, have been evacuated. A state of emergency was declared for Lake County by California Governor Jerry Brown. A construction worker from Clearlake, Damin Pashilk, was arrested and was charged with 17 counts of arson related to the Clayton Fire and other fires in the area. He pled guilty of four counts, and was sentenced in September 2019 to approximately 15 years in state prison.

On the fifth day, August 17, road closures remained and evacuation centers also remained open, with 40 percent of the fire being contained, burning a total of 3,929 acres (15.90 km^{2}), and 2,327 fire personnel were on the ground. As of August 24, the fire was 98% contained and had destroyed 300 and damaged 28 buildings, and residents were able to return to their homes.
