= San Antonio Dam =

- Interactive map of San Antonio Dam
- Country: United States
- Location: Monterey County, California
- Coordinates: 35°47′53″N 120°53′07″W
- Opening date: 1965; 61 years ago
- Owner: Monterey County Water Resources Agency

Dam and spillways
- Type of dam: Earth dam
- Impounds: San Antonio River
- Height: 202 feet (62 m)
- Length: 1,433 feet (437 m)
- Elevation at crest: 802 feet (244 m)
- Width (crest): 30 feet (9.1 m)
- Dam volume: 4,200,000 cubic yards (3,200,000 m^{3})

Reservoir
- Creates: Lake San Antonio
- Total capacity: 350,000 acre-feet (430,000,000 m^{3})
- Catchment area: 353 square miles (910 km^{2})
- Surface area: 5,720 acres (2,310 ha)
- Normal elevation: 781 feet (238 m)

San Antonio Dam (National ID CA00813) is an earthen dam on the San Antonio River in Monterey County, California in the United States. The dam impounds Lake San Antonio, a reservoir with a capacity of 350,000 acre-feet (430,000,000 m^{3}), located west of Camp Roberts.

== History ==
San Antonio Dam was completed in 1965.

== Access ==
The dam is accessible from Exit 252 of U.S. Route 101 by taking Jolon Road to Nacimiento Lake Drive to Vista Road.

== Operations ==
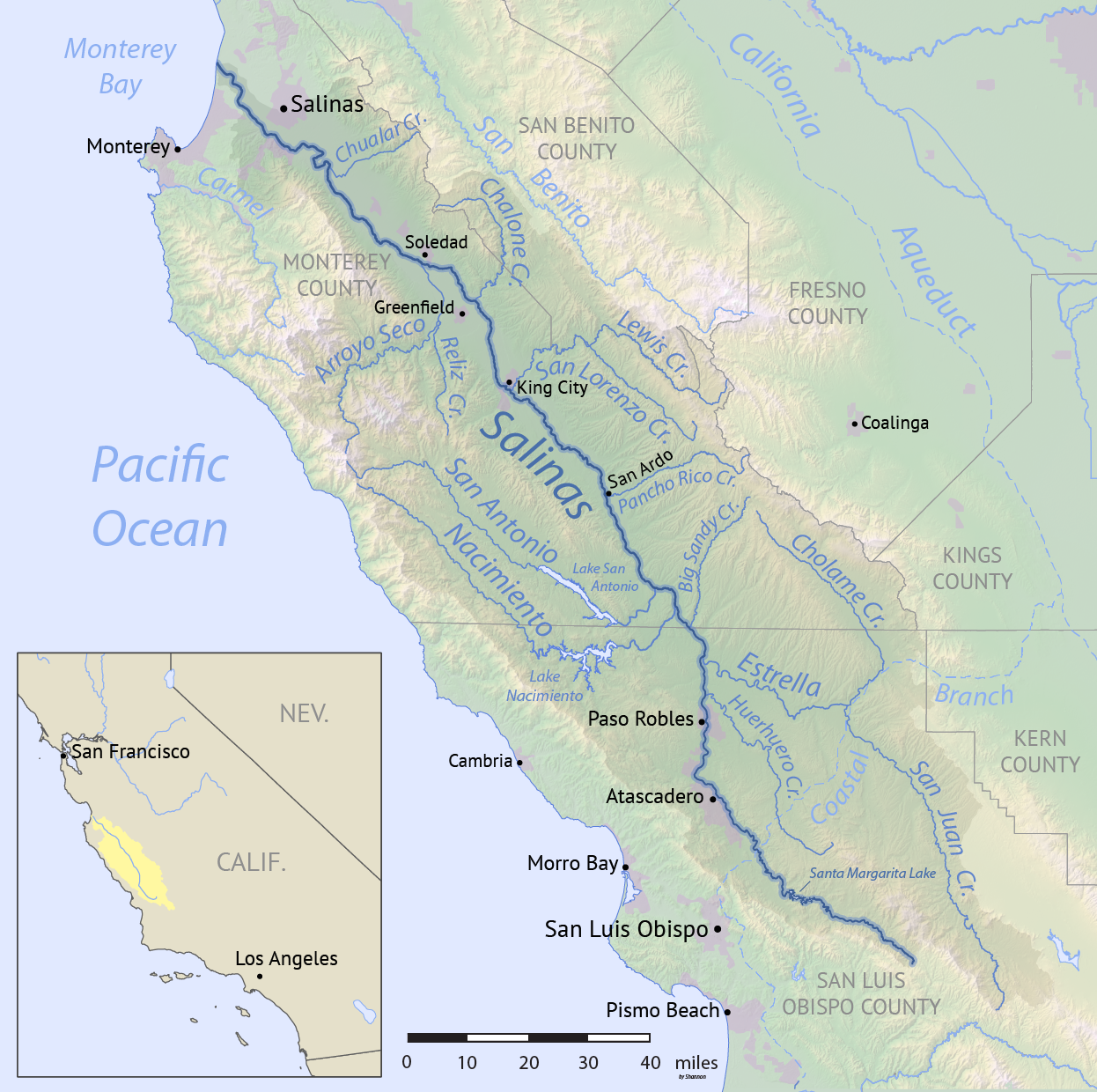

Water released from San Antonio Dam travels down the San Antonio River to join the Salinas River on its way to Monterey Bay.

== Nomenclature ==
Another dam with the same name is located on San Antonio Creek in San Bernardino County, California.

== See also ==
- List of largest reservoirs of California
- List of reservoirs and dams in California
