= Lake Nacimiento =

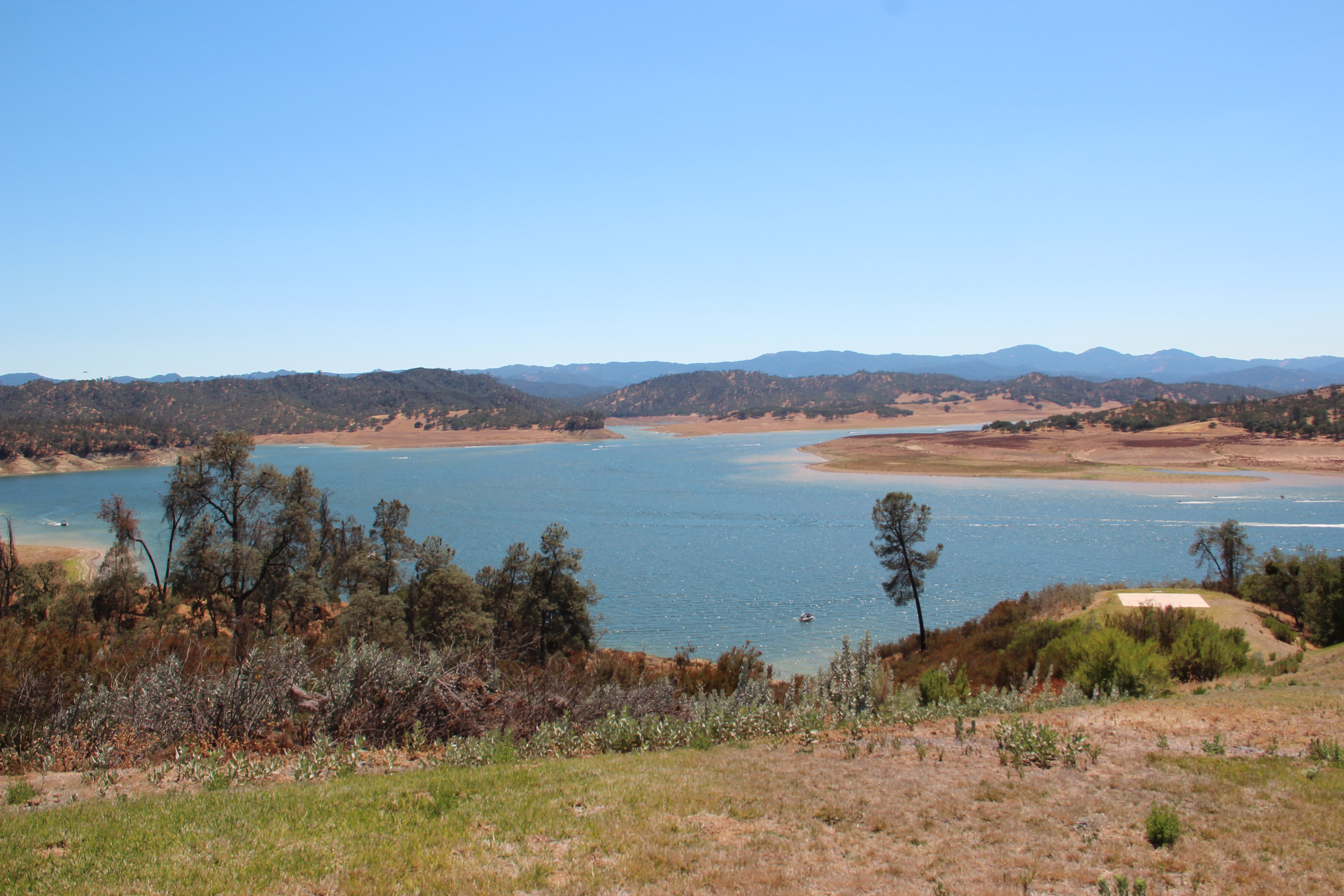
- Lake Nacimiento in 2015

- Location within California Location within the United States
- Location: San Luis Obispo County, California
- Coordinates: 35.74345°N 120.96085°W
- Type: Reservoir
- Primary inflows: Nacimiento River
- Primary outflows: Nacimiento River
- Basin countries: United States
- Managing agency: Monterey County Water Resources Agency
- Max. length: 18 mi (29 km)
- Surface area: 5,400 acres (2,200 ha)
- Water volume: 377,000 acre⋅ft (465,000,000 m^{3})
- Website: www.co.monterey.ca.us

Lake Nacimiento is an 18-mile (29 km) long reservoir on the Nacimiento River in northern San Luis Obispo County, California. The lake contains many arms including Snake Creek and Dip Creek, nearer the dam, and the central Las Tablas and Franklin Creeks. Due to the dragon-like shape created by the positions of these arms, it is sometimes referred to as Dragon Lake.

== Geography ==
Consumption of bass, crappie, carp, and catfish from the lake can be dangerous due to mercury, but blue gill and sucker fish may be eaten only once per week safely. The lake is unique among California reservoirs in that it contains, among other species, introduced white bass, which thrive in the lake and spawn in the river and inflowing creeks in spring. In fact, the world fly fishing record for a white bass was broken in 1981 at Lake Nacimiento. The fish was caught by Cory Wells, a member of Three Dog Night; the record would stand for over 27 years. Lake Nacimiento can also produce power from a turbine at the base of the dam.

According to the Salinas Californian newspaper, the Monterey County Board of Supervisors (Marc Del Piero, Barbara Shipnuck, Dusan Petrovic, Sam Karas, and Karin Strasser-Kaufman) appropriated the funds to build the turbine, which increased "green energy" supplies for Monterey County.

The California Office of Environmental Health Hazard Assessment (OEHHA) has developed a safe eating advisory for Lake Nacimiento, based on levels of mercury found in fish caught from this water body.

== History ==
The lake was designed for irrigation water and flood control as well as recreation. Nacimiento Dam, a 210-foot (64 m) earthfill dam, forms the lake. The dam was built by the Monterey County Water Authority which completed construction in 1956. The water authority uses the lake to recharge its groundwater. The lake is near the city of Paso Robles.

Lake Nacimiento has a capacity of 377,000 acre⋅ft (465 million m^{3}). The lake can fill quickly in the winter from river surges resulting from downpours upstream in the Santa Lucia Range so the level is not usually allowed to capacity until May 1 of each year.

The lake was developed and paid for by Monterey County. San Luis Obispo County retained the rights to 17,500 acre⋅ft (21.6 million m^{3}) of water per year. In October 2007, construction started on a pipeline to bring water from the lake to Paso Robles, Templeton, Atascadero, and San Luis Obispo. The project went online in January 2011. The lake's dam was shut down during 2014 due to damage that occurred to one of the turbines, and as a result the neighboring Lake San Antonio was emptied to critical levels to supply the Salinas Valley with groundwater.

Even though the lake is entirely inside San Luis Obispo County, the waters are patrolled by the Monterey County Parks Department under a joint powers agreement with San Luis Obispo County. The Monterey County Parks Department's primary jurisdiction is the lake waters, up to the high-water mark and the resort area. The San Luis Obispo County Sheriff's Office has a boat at the lake for access to the backcountry around the lake and has been known to write tickets on the water. Lake Nacimiento is a haven for watersport enthusiasts. The lake provides ample room for waterskiing, wakeboarding, jetskiing, wakesurfing, and other water-related activities.

The lake is also the home of two residential housing developments, which lie on the shore: Heritage Ranch and Oak Shores. There are several smaller (10–40 house) private subdivisions on the southwest side of the lake. These houses were affected by the Chimney Fire in August 2016. Except for the resort area near the dam, most of the property around the lake is private. Overnight camping on the lake, outside of the resort, is not allowed; setting up or venturing on land above the high-water mark is considered trespassing.

== See also ==
- List of dams and reservoirs in California
- List of lakes in California
- List of largest reservoirs of California
