= Lake San Antonio =

Lake in Monterey County, California

- Location within California Location within the United States

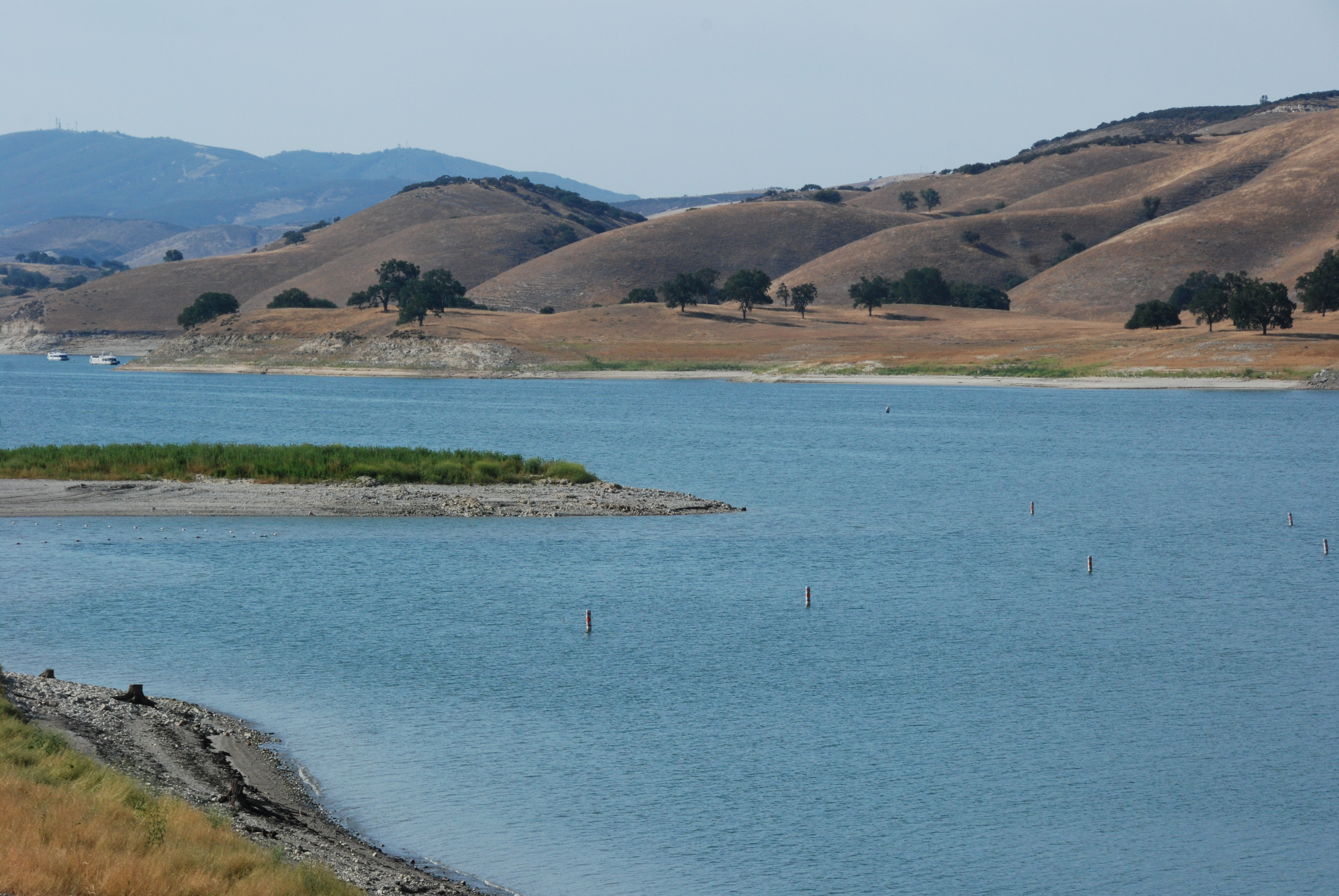
- Location: Monterey and San Luis Obispo counties, California
- Coordinates: 35°47′53″N 120°53′07″W
- Type: Reservoir
- Primary inflows: San Antonio River
- Primary outflows: San Antonio River
- Catchment area: 353 square miles (910 km^{2})
- Basin countries: United States
- Managing agency: Monterey County Water Resources Agency
- Surface area: 5,720 acres (2,310 ha)
- Water volume: 350,000 acre-feet (430,000,000 m^{3})
- Website: www.co.monterey.ca.us

Lake San Antonio is a lake located primarily in southern Monterey County, California, and partially in northern San Luis Obispo County, California. The lake is formed by San Antonio Dam on the San Antonio River. The dam is 202 feet (62 m) tall and was completed in 1965 under Monterey County District Engineer Loran Bunte Jr . The lake and dam are owned by the Monterey County Water Authority. The lake has a capacity of 350,000 acre-feet (430,000,000 m^{3}).

Lake San Antonio's primary purpose is to provide groundwater. Without the lake, the San Antonio River would be nearly dry in the summer months. With water in the river year-round, more of it can seep into the ground.

Most of the lake's water has dried in recent years. The 2014 Wildflower Triathlon had to accommodate the extremely low water level by moving the swim portion two miles from where it is traditionally held. Participants that year had to run along the former lake bed to get to their bikes transition area. In June 2015, the Monterey County Board of Supervisors announced it would close the camping and other facilities at Lake San Antonio effective 1 July 2015, due to costs and falling attendance.

In 2024, the lake was closed to recreation due to a large fish die-off that appeared to effect all fish species present in the lake, including catfish, bass, and trout.

== Area activities ==
Boating, waterskiing, fishing and camping are popular recreational activities at the lake, particularly in the summer. Visitors can bring their own boats or rent them at the lake. Horseback riding and mountain biking are also popular; the south shore of Lake San Antonio has 26 miles of trails.

The California Office of Environmental Health Hazard Assessment (OEHHA) has developed a safe eating advisory for Lake San Antonio based on levels of mercury or PCBs found in fish caught from this water body.

== Camping ==
Lake San Antonio has over 500 campsites. Many campsites have RV hookups. Sites are available both directly on the north shore and on the south shore of the lake, as well as in the more forested areas a short walk away. The North Shore of Lake San Antonio is unique, as it is one of the few lakes in California that permits shoreline camping on the water's edge. Because of this, it has grown in popularity with boaters, who are allowed to keep their vessels in the water by their campsite. There is ample shoreline camping at North Shore. Most campers prefer North Shore over Lake Nacimiento (Located 9 miles south) because of the much larger campsites, and ability to camp on the water's edge.

== Wildlife ==
Deer are frequently spotted in the campsites, even lounging around near campsites during daylight hours. Other wildlife that may be spotted include mountain lions, snakes, wild pigs, racoons, bobcats, and badgers. Eagles frequent the lake and tours are offered during select months.

=== Bald eagles ===
Lake San Antonio is a popular winter habitat for the bald eagle, the national symbol of the United States. Monterey County Parks provides tours in January and February for visitors interested in viewing the bald eagle in its native habitat. Tours must be reserved in advance, as they often sell out weeks before they take place.

== Wildflower Triathlon ==
Lake San Antonio is the site of the annual Wildflower Triathlon, one of the largest triathlon events in the world. The "Long Course", a half-Ironman, is considered to be especially grueling.

== Falling Lake Levels and Closure ==
Beginning in summer 2013, the water level at Lake San Antonio fell dramatically. The initial drop occurred during emergency repairs on the Lake Nacimiento Dam - Lake San Antonio water was used to sustain the flow of the river below the dam. The problem was exacerbated by the ongoing drought in the region. With lake facilities such as the boat ramp no longer usable, attendance fell sharply (from over 250,000 visitors per year to under 100,000 in 2014). Due to lower revenues and high costs to maintain the facilities, the Monterey County Board of Supervisors opted to close the lake effective 1 July 2015 for the remainder of the summer season. Starting in October 2017, the south shore resort area was to open only on weekends, and the north shore area was to be closed, until Memorial Day weekend 2018.

== Resurgence ==
Lake levels rebounded between 2016 and 2020, then dipped again in 2021. Since 2022 the lake level has returned to historic averages.

== See also ==
- List of dams and reservoirs in California
- List of lakes in California
- List of largest reservoirs of California
