= Monterey County, California =

County in California, United States

Coordinates: 36.24°N 121.31°W

Monterey County
- County
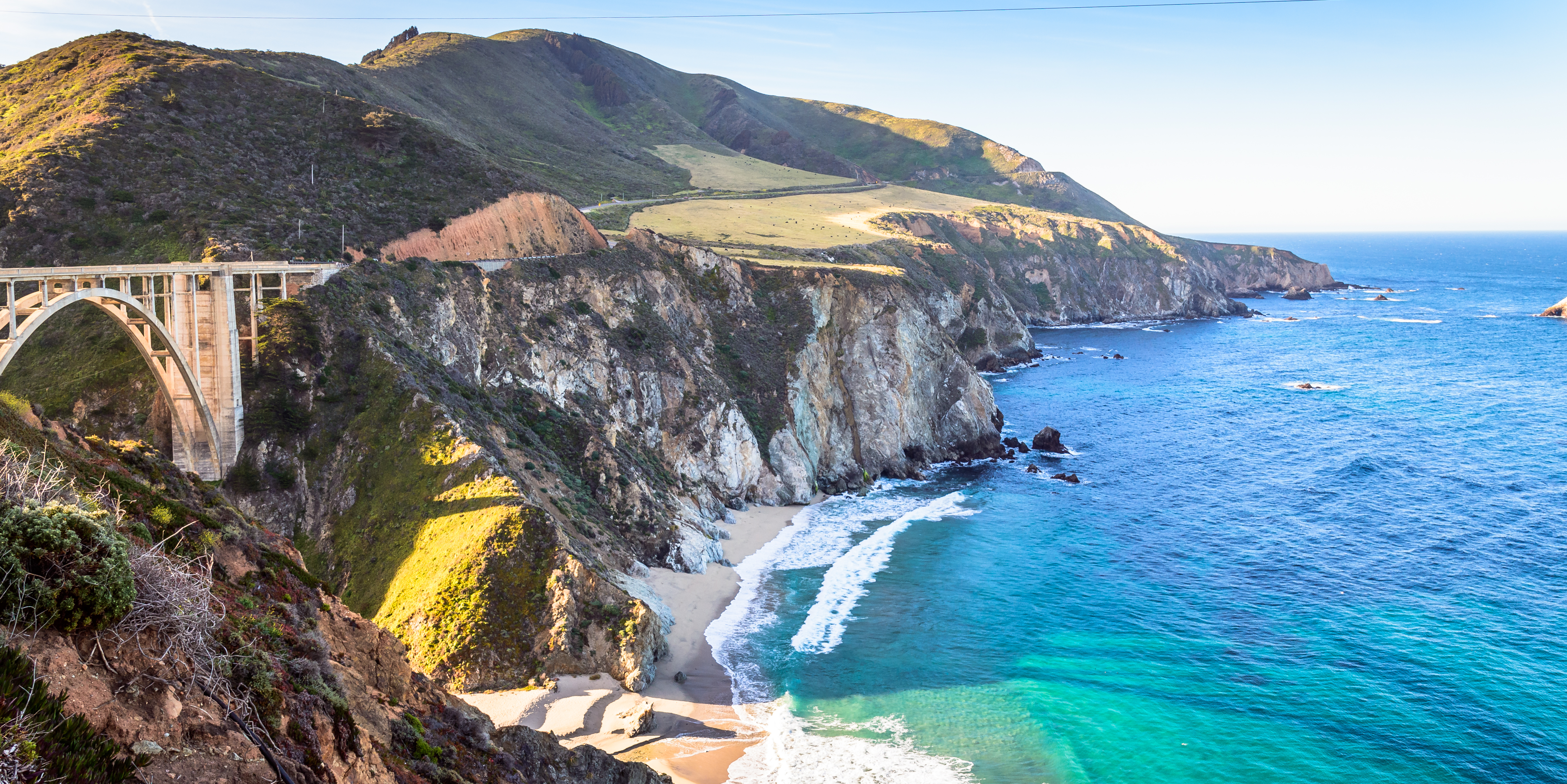
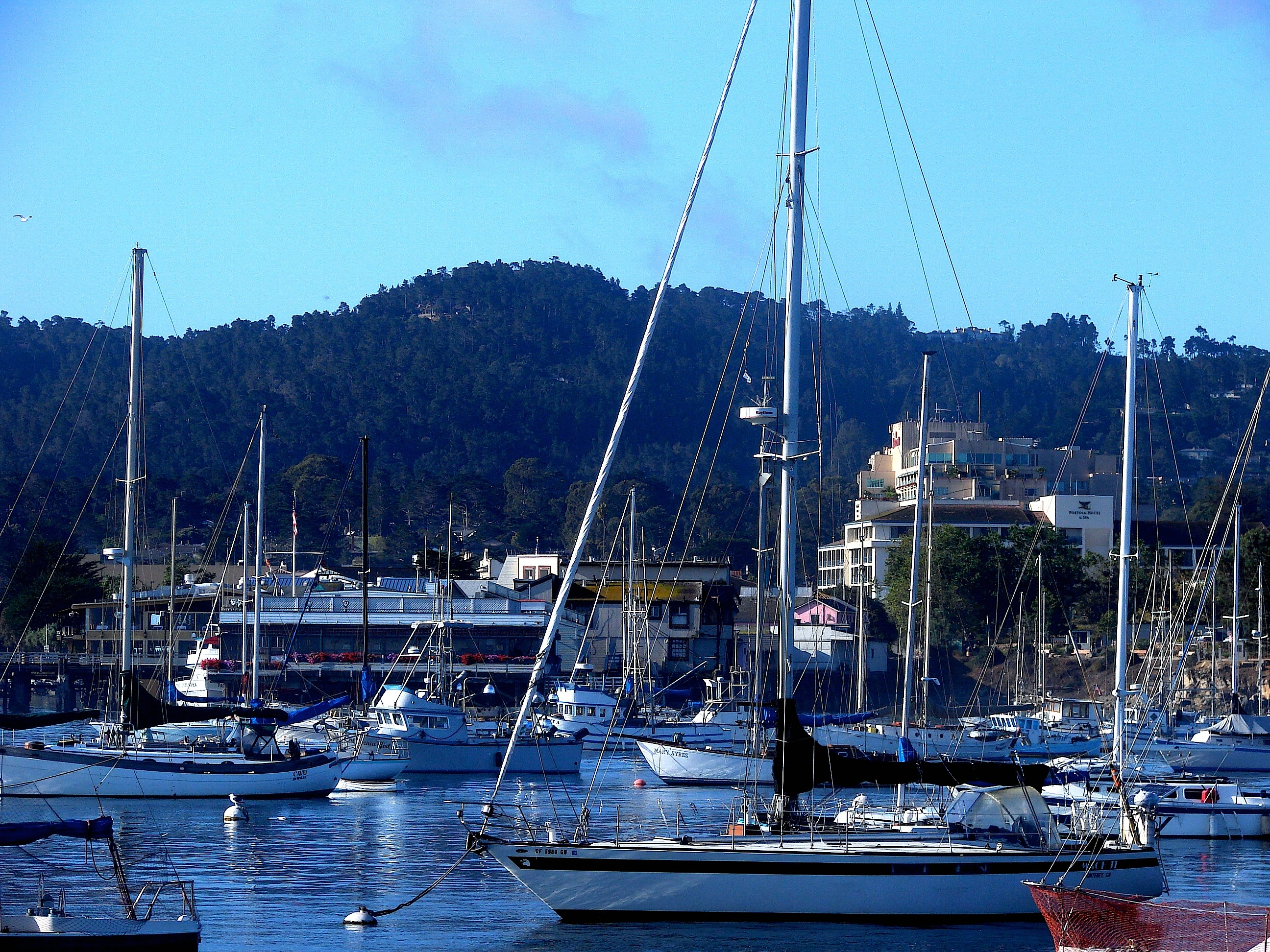
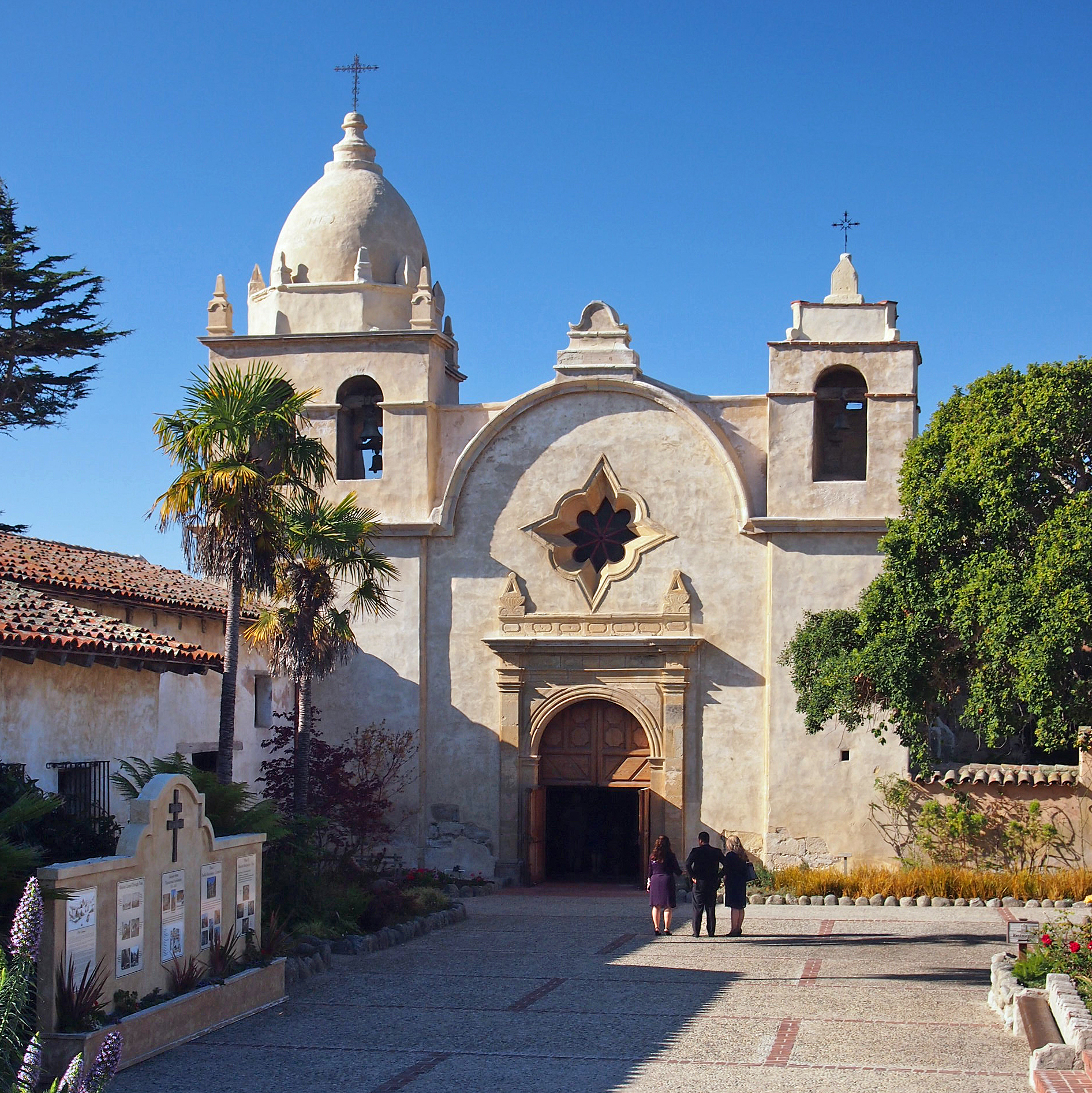
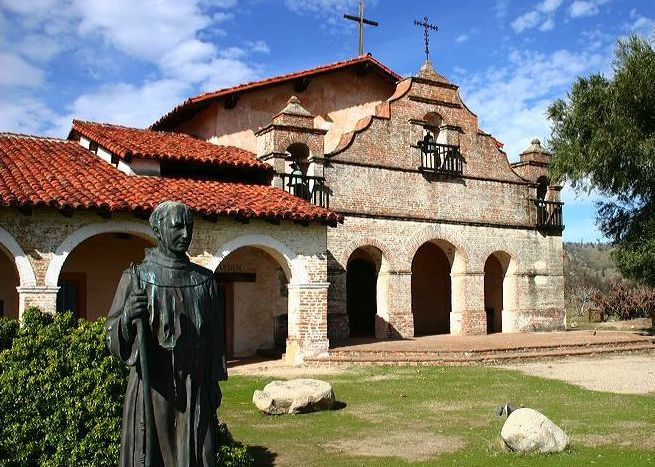
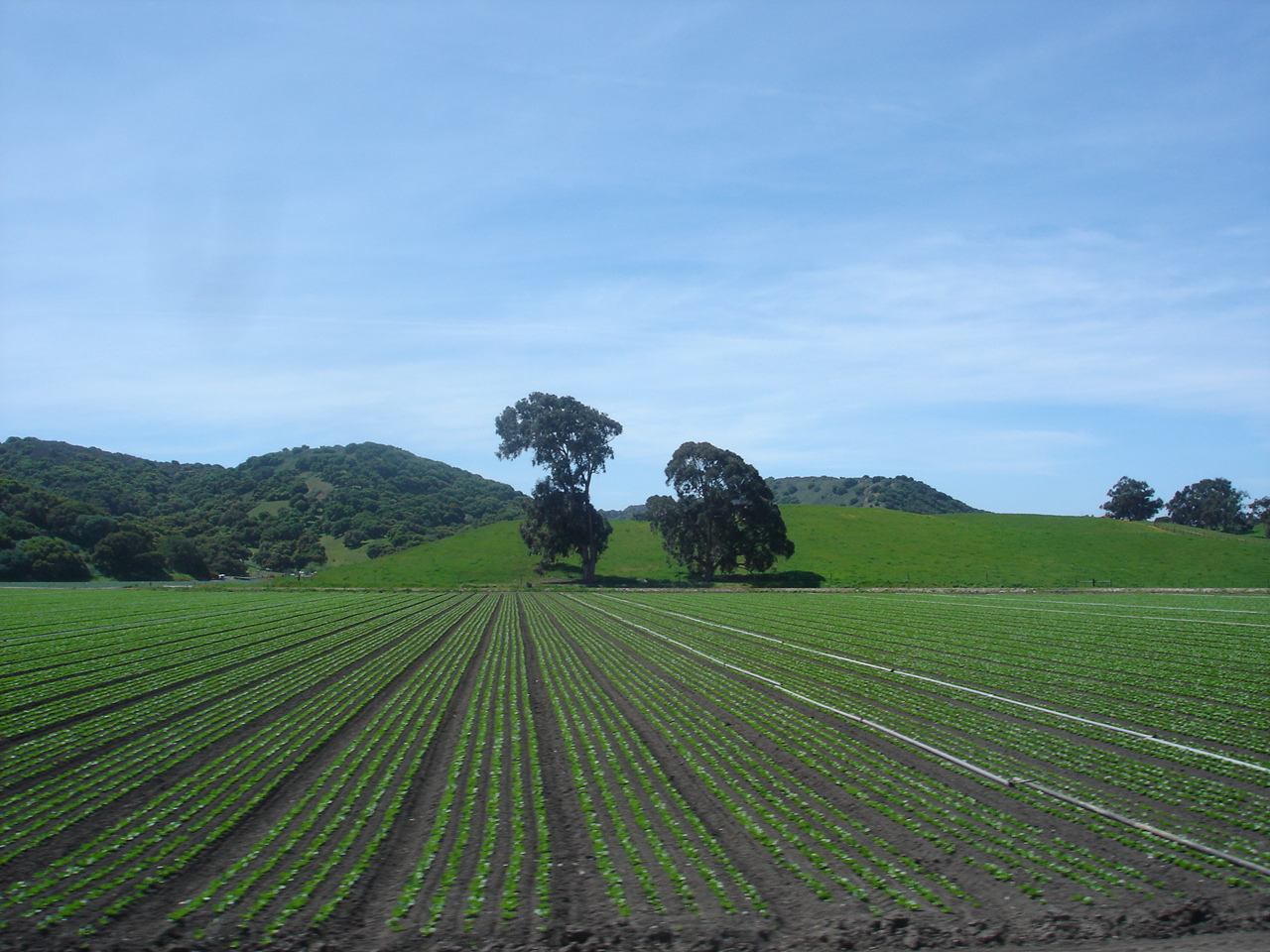
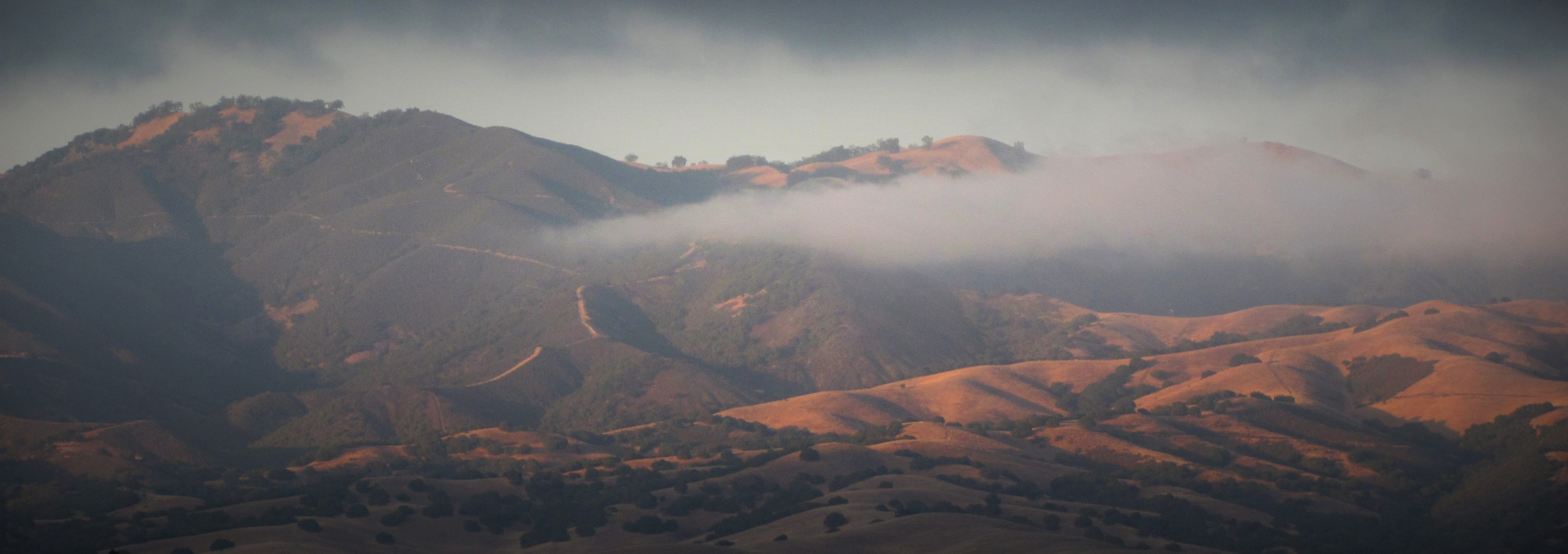
- Big Sur on the Central Coast Monterey Carmel-by-the-Sea Jolon Salinas Valley Gabilan Range seen from Chualar

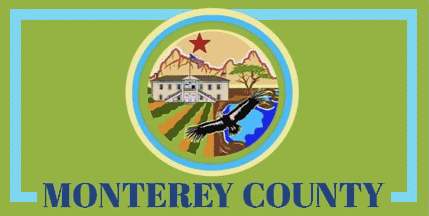
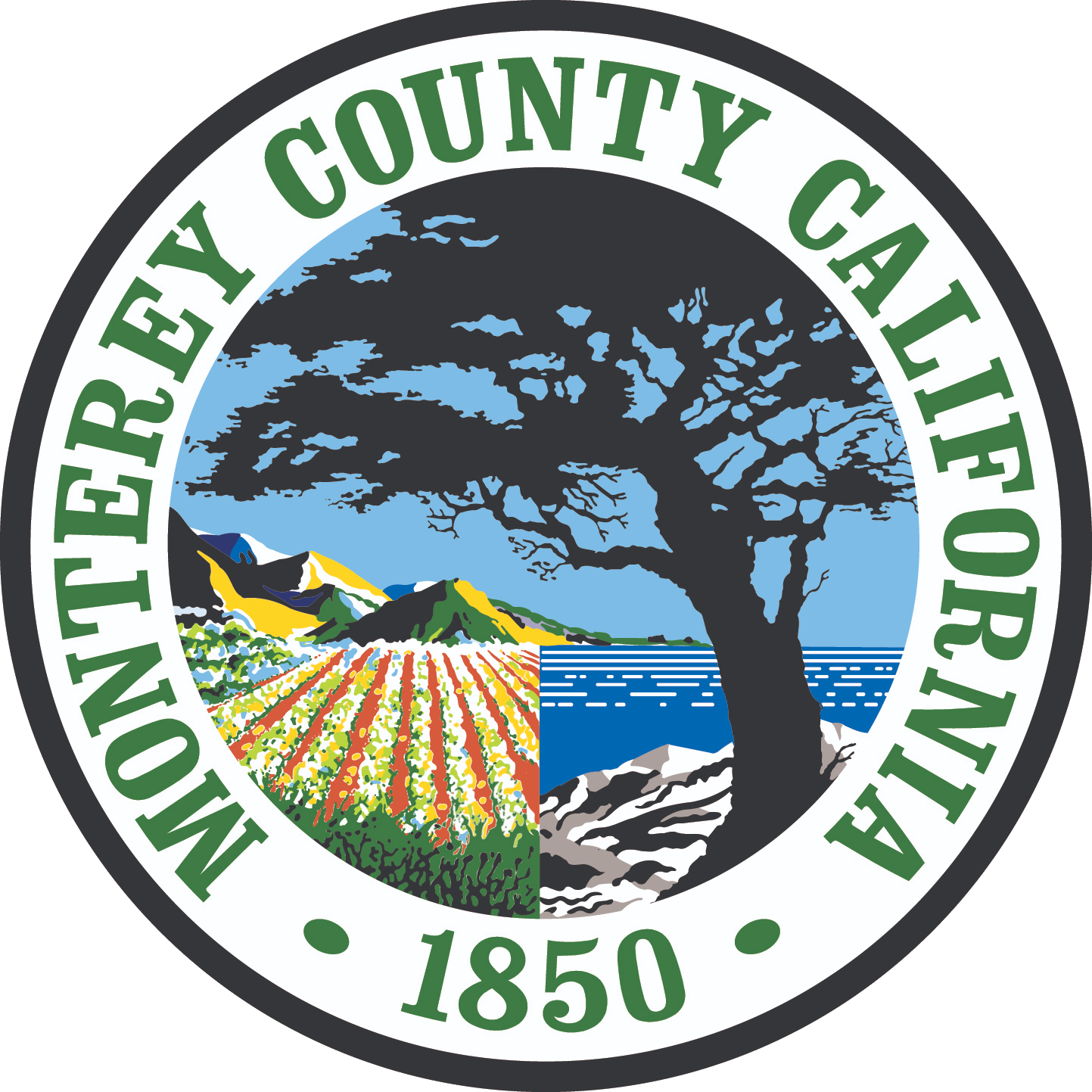
- Flag Seal
- Interactive map of Monterey County
- Location in the state of California
- Country: United States
- State: California
- Region: Northern California
- Incorporated: February 18, 1850
- Named for: Monterey Bay
- County seat: Salinas
- Largest city: Salinas

Government
  - Type: Council–CAO
  - Body: Board of Supervisors
  - Chair: Wendy Root Askew
  - Vice Chair: Kate Daniels
  - Board of Supervisors: Supervisors: Luis Alejo; Glenn Church; Chris Lopez; Wendy Root Askew; Kate Daniels
  - County Administrative Office: Sonia M. De La Rosa

Area
  - Total: 3,771 sq mi (9,770 km^{2})
  - Land: 3,281 sq mi (8,500 km^{2})
  - Water: 491 sq mi (1,270 km^{2})
- Highest elevation: 5,865 ft (1,788 m)

Population (2020)
  - Total: 439,035
  - Estimate (2025): 433,729 ▼
  - Density: 133.8/sq mi (51.66/km^{2})

GDP
  - Total: $33.249 billion (2022)
- Time zone: UTC-8 (Pacific Time Zone)
  - Summer (DST): UTC-7 (Pacific Daylight Time)
- Area codes: 805, 831
- Congressional districts: 18th, 19th
- Website: countyofmonterey.gov

Monterey County (/ˌmɒntəˈreɪ/ MON-tə-RAY), officially the County of Monterey, is a county located on the Pacific coast in the U.S. state of California. As of the 2020 United States census, its population was 439,035. The county's largest city and county seat is Salinas. Monterey County comprises the Salinas, California, Metropolitan Statistical Area. It borders on the southern part of Monterey Bay, after which it is named (northern half of the bay is in Santa Cruz County). Monterey County is a member of the regional governmental agency: the Association of Monterey Bay Area Governments. Scenic features along the coastline - including Carmel-by-the-Sea, Big Sur, State Route 1, and the 17 Mile Drive on the Monterey Peninsula - have made the county famous around the world. Back when California was under Spanish and Mexican rule, the city of Monterey was its capital. Today, the economy of the county is mostly based on tourism in its coastal regions, and on agriculture in the region of the Salinas River valley. Most of the county's inhabitants live near the northern coast or in Salinas Valley; the southern coast and inland mountainous regions are sparsely populated.

== History ==
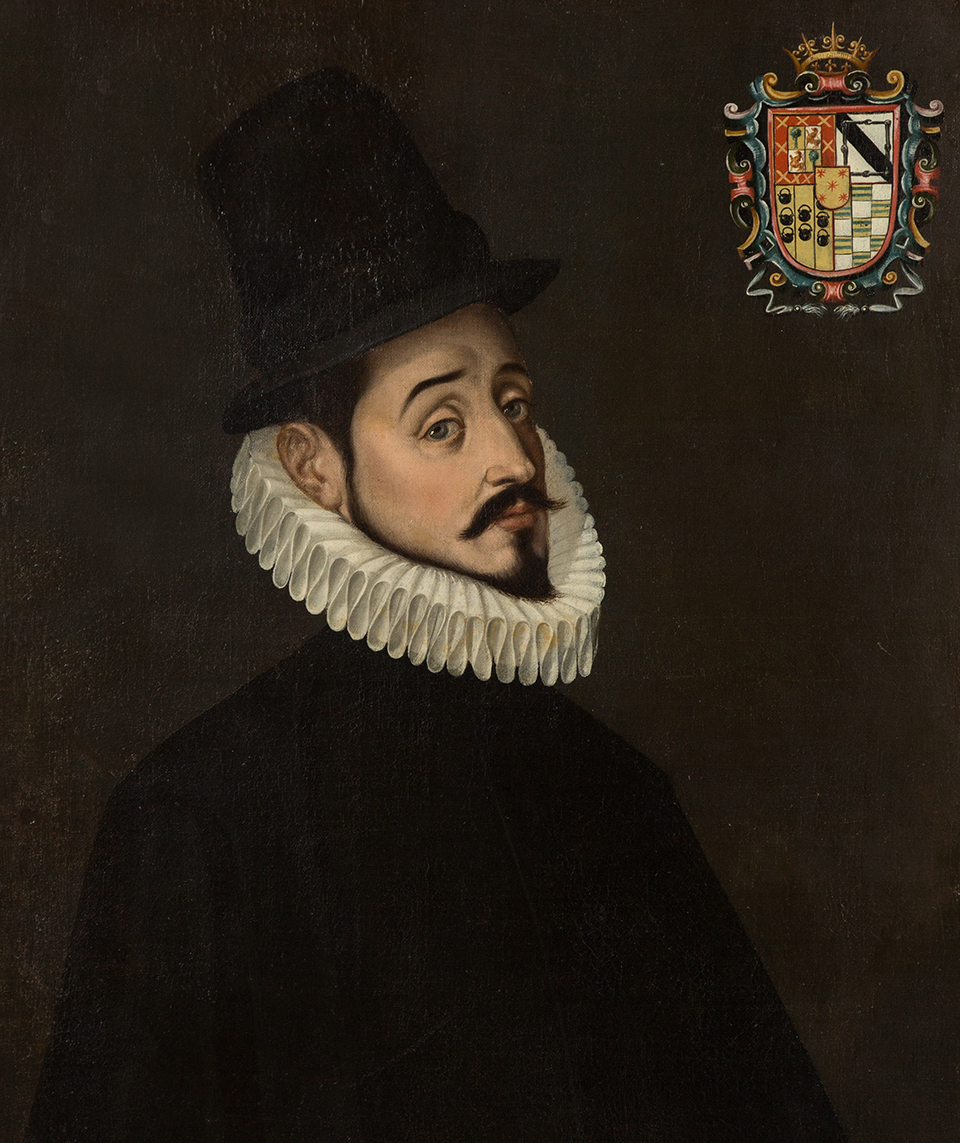
Gaspar de Zúñiga, 5th Count of Monterrey, namesake of Monterey Bay and thus the city and the county.

Monterey County was one of the original counties of California, created in 1850 at the time of statehood. Parts of the county were given to San Benito County in 1874. The area was originally populated by Ohlone, Salinan and the Esselen tribes.

The Coco McBride Earthquake struck near Soledad on November 19, 2026, at approximately 10:49 p.m. PST (06:49 UTC on November 20) The United States Geological Survey reported a preferred moment magnitude of 5.0, with an epicenter approximately 10 km (6.2 mi) northwest of Pinnacles and a focal depth of 6.7 km (4.2 mi). An initial automatic solution had estimated a moment magnitude of 5.4 and placed the epicenter 19 km (12 mi) north-northeast of Soledad.

The county derives its name from Monterey Bay. The bay was named by Sebastián Vizcaíno in 1602 in honor of the Conde de Monterrey (or Count of Monterrey), then the Viceroy of New Spain. Monterrey is a variation of Monterrei, a municipality in the Galicia region of Spain where the Conde de Monterrey and his father (the Fourth Count of Monterrei) were from.

== Geography ==
According to the U.S. Census Bureau, the county has a total area of 3,771 square miles (9,770 km^{2}), of which 3,281 square miles (8,500 km^{2}) is land and 491 square miles (1,270 km^{2}) (13%) is water. The county is roughly 1.5 times larger than the state of Delaware, and roughly similar in population and the size to Santa Barbara County.

=== Adjacent counties ===
Counties and bodies of water adjacent to Monterey County, California

Santa Cruz County to the north, San Benito County, Fresno County, and Kings County to the east as well as San Luis Obispo County to the south. The southeast corner of the county borders Kern County.

=== National protected areas ===
- Los Padres National Forest (part)
- Pinnacles National Park (part)
- Salinas River National Wildlife Refuge
- Ventana Wilderness (part)

In October 2019, the Bureau of Land Management ended a five-year moratorium on leasing federal land in California to fossil fuel companies, opening 725,000 acres (1100 sq. miles; 29,000 ha) to drilling in San Benito, Monterey, and Fresno counties.

=== Marine protected areas ===
- Soquel Canyon State Marine Conservation Area
- Elkhorn Slough State Marine Reserve
- Elkhorn Slough State Marine Conservation Area
- Moro Cojo Slough State Marine Reserve
- Portuguese Ledge State Marine Conservation Area
- Pacific Grove Marine Gardens State Marine Conservation Area
- Lovers Point State Marine Reserve
- Edward F. Ricketts State Marine Conservation Area
- Asilomar State Marine Reserve

=== Flora and fauna ===
Monterey County has habitat to support the following endangered species:

- Hickman's potentilla
- Santa Cruz Long-toed Salamander
- Santa Cruz Tarweed
- Southern Steelhead Trout
- Yadon's piperia

== Demographics ==
Historical population
Census	Pop.	Note	%±
1850	1,872		—
1860	4,739		153.2%
1870	9,876		108.4%
1880	11,302		14.4%
1890	18,637		64.9%
1900	19,380		4.0%
1910	24,146		24.6%
1920	27,980		15.9%
1930	53,705		91.9%
1940	73,032		36.0%
1950	130,498		78.7%
1960	198,351		52.0%
1970	250,071		26.1%
1980	290,444		16.1%
1990	355,660		22.5%
2000	401,762		13.0%
2010	415,057		3.3%
2020	439,035		5.8%
2025 (est.)	433,729	▼	−1.2%
U.S. Decennial Census; 1790–1960 1900–1990; 1990–2000 2010 2020

=== 2020 census ===
As of the 2020 census, the county had a population of 439,035, with a median age of 35.0 years; 25.3% of residents were under the age of 18 and 14.2% were 65 years of age or older. For every 100 females there were 101.5 males, and for every 100 females age 18 and over there were 100.6 males age 18 and older.

The racial makeup of the county was 36.2% White, 2.3% Black or African American, 2.9% American Indian and Alaska Native, 6.1% Asian, 0.5% Native Hawaiian and Pacific Islander, 34.2% from some other race, and 17.9% from two or more races. Hispanic or Latino residents of any race comprised 60.4% of the population.

85.7% of residents lived in urban areas, while 14.3% lived in rural areas.

There were 131,789 households in the county, of which 40.1% had children under the age of 18 living with them and 25.6% had a female householder with no spouse or partner present. About 20.5% of all households were made up of individuals and 9.8% had someone living alone who was 65 years of age or older.

There were 143,631 housing units, of which 8.2% were vacant. Among occupied housing units, 50.9% were owner-occupied and 49.1% were renter-occupied. The homeowner vacancy rate was 0.9% and the rental vacancy rate was 4.0%.

=== Racial and ethnic composition ===
Monterey County, California – Racial and ethnic composition Note: the US Census treats Hispanic/Latino as an ethnic category. This table excludes Latinos from the racial categories and assigns them to a separate category. Hispanics/Latinos may be of any race.
Race / Ethnicity (NH = Non-Hispanic)	Pop 1980	Pop 1990	Pop 2000	Pop 2010	Pop 2020	% 1980	% 1990	% 2000	% 2010	% 2020
White alone (NH)	173,456	186,166	162,045	136,435	120,077	59.72%	52.34%	40.33%	32.87%	27.35%
Black or African American alone (NH)	18,425	21,506	14,085	11,300	9,051	6.34%	6.05%	3.51%	2.72%	2.06%
Native American or Alaska Native alone (NH)	2,927	2,124	1,782	1,361	1,314	1.01%	0.60%	0.44%	0.33%	0.30%
Asian alone (NH)	19,696	25,365	23,203	23,777	25,123	6.78%	7.13%	5.78%	5.73%	5.72%
Native Hawaiian or Pacific Islander alone (NH)	x	x	1,543	1,868	1,859	0.38%	0.45%	0.38%	0.45%	0.42%
Other race alone (NH)	811	929	1,190	741	2,170	0.28%	0.26%	0.30%	0.18%	0.49%
Mixed race or Multiracial (NH)	x	x	9,945	9,572	14,120	x	x	2.48%	2.31%	3.22%
Hispanic or Latino (any race)	75,129	119,570	187,969	230,003	265,321	25.87%	33.62%	46.79%	55.41%	60.43%
Total	290,444	355,660	401,762	415,057	439,035	100.00%	100.00%	100.00%	100.00%	100.00%

=== American Community Survey 2025 data ===
The United States Census Bureau estimated that in 2025, Monterey County’s population was 433.729. It was also estimated that the county's population was 25,59% Non-Hispanic White, 62,89% Hispanic or Latino, 2,12% Non-Hispanic Black, 5,90% Asian, 0,27% Native American, 0,41% Pacific Islander, and 2,81% Multiracial.

Total	Population	Percentage
Non-Hispanic White	110.998	25,59%
Hispanic or Latino	272.790	62,89%
Non-Hispanic Black	9.213	2,12%
Asian	25.577	5,90%
Native American	1.190	0,27%
Pacific Islander	1.768	0,41%
Non-Hispanic Multiracial	12.193	2,81%

=== Income, education and poverty 2013 ===
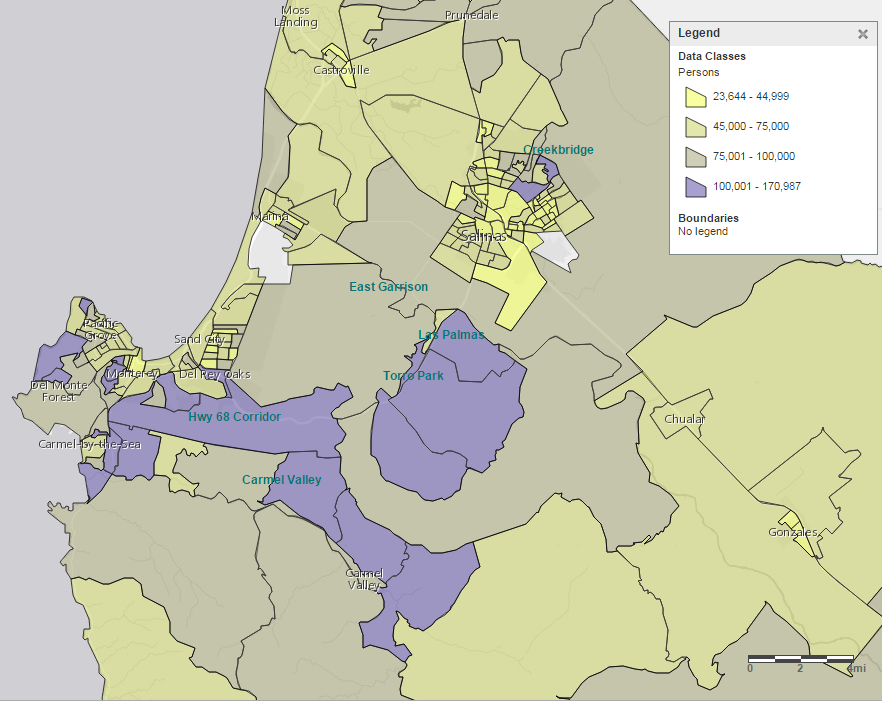
Median Household Income across the populated northern half of Monterey County, as of 2014.

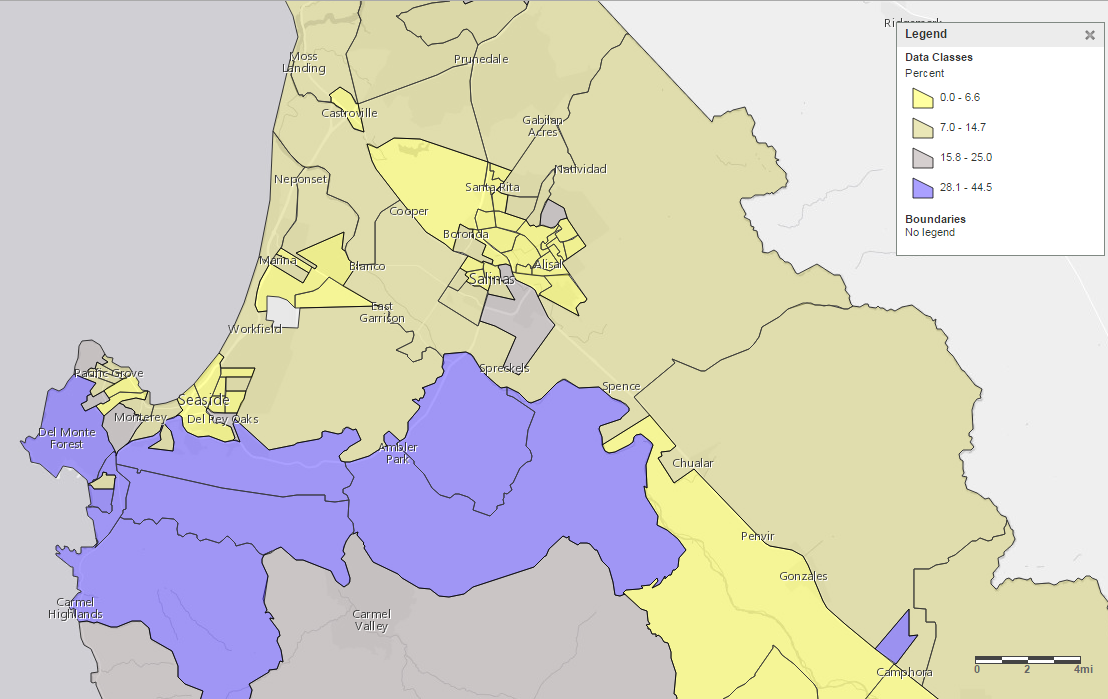
Percent of affluent households (i.e. $150k annual income or higher) across census tracts in most populated area of the county.

Generally, the western/southern parts of the Monterey Peninsula, Carmel Valley, Creekbridge (Salinas), and eastern parts of Prunedale were the county's most affluent and educated (see dark blue on map). These areas had a median household income significantly above that of the California or the U.S. overall (typically above $95,000 vs. $60,000 for California and $52,000 for the U.S.) and comprised roughly 8%-10% of neighborhoods (as defined by Census Block Groups). Educational attainment was at least on part with, or above, state and national levels, in these areas while the percentage of people living in poverty was typically a third or less than national and statewide average (with the exception of South Salinas).

Social deprivation (poverty and low levels of educational attainment) was concentrated in the central and eastern parts of Salinas, and central areas of Monterey, Seaside, Marina, Soledad and King City. In central and eastern Salinas up to 46% of individuals lived below the poverty line and those without a secondary educations formed a plurality or majority of residents. Overall, the Salinas metropolitan area, defined as coterminous with Monterey County, was among the least educated urban areas in the nation.

==== Most affluent neighborhoods ====
Roughly 8% of neighborhoods, as defined by Census Block Groups, had a median household income above $100,000 per year, about 60% above the national median. This coincided with the top 20 census block groups in the county listed below.

Most affluent neighborhoods (Median Household Income above $100k/yr.)

Rank	neighborhood	Census Reference/Geo-Unit	Median Household Income
1	Carmel Valley (North-West)	Block Group 1, Census Tract 116.02	$152,411
2	Mount Toro Foothills, Salinas Valley	Block Group 3, Census Tract 107.01	$143,508
3	Jacks Peak, Monterey	Block Group 1, Census Tract 132	$142,143
4	Mount Toro Foothills, Salinas Valley	Block Group 2, Census Tract 107.02	$141,364
5	Skyline Forest, Monterey	Block Group 3, Census Tract 128	$130,221
6	Yankee Point, Carmel	Block Group 3, Census Tract 117	$126,389
7	Carmel Valley (North-West)	Block Group 3, Census Tract 116.02	$122,056
8	Carmel Valley (North-West)	Block Group 4, Census Tract 116.02	$118,159
9	Carmel Valley (North-West)	Block Group 2, Census Tract 110	$118,125
10	Carmel Valley (North-West)	Block Group 4, Census Tract 110	$115,667
11	Carmel (East, outside of city limits)	Block Group 2, Census Tract 117	$115,357
12	Jacks Peak, Monterey	Block Group 2, Census Tract 132	$113,750
13	Skyline Forest, Monterey	Block Group 5, Census Tract 128	$111,500
14	City of Carmel (Southern half)	Block Group 1, Census Tract 118.02	$110,962
15	Las Palmas, Salinas Valley	Block Group 2, Census Tract 107.01	$110,918
16	Pebble Beach, Monterey Peninsula Country Club	Block Group 4, Census Tract 119	$107,500
17	Mount Toro Foothills, Salinas Valley	Block Group 1, Census Tract 107.02	$105,511
18	Carmel Valley (North-West)	Block Group 1, Census Tract 116.04	$104,902
19	City of Carmel (Northern half)	Block Group 2, Census Tract 118.01	$101,984
20	Creekbridge (incl. Falcon Meadows), Salinas	Block Group 2, Census Tract 106.03	$100,673
141*	United States	N/A	$53,046
104*	California	N/A	$61,094
154*	City of Salinas	N/A	$49,264

* Asterisk denotes a hypothetical rank among Monterey County's 226 Census Block Groups (e.g. if the U.S. overall was a Census Block Group in Monterey County, it would be the 141st most affluent of 226).

==== Least affluent neighborhoods ====
About 4.5% of neighborhoods, as defined by Census Block Groups, had a median household income below $30,000 per year, about 60% below the national median. This coincided with the 10 poorest of the 20 lowest income neighborhoods listed in the table below.

Least affluent neighborhoods (Median Household Income of $34.1k or less)

Rank	neighborhood	Census Reference/Geo-Unit	Median Household Income
1	Downtown Salinas	Block Group 1, Census Tract 13	$21,411
2	Central Seaside	Block Group 3, Census Tract 137	$22,994
3	East Salinas (Del Monte Ave.)	Block Group 1, Census Tract 7.01	$23,250
4	Downtown Monterey	Block Group 1, Census Tract 127	$24,911
5	Central Marina (Del Monte Blvd.)	Block Group 3, Census Tract 142.01	$25,464
6	Hebbron Heights, East Salinas	Block Group 2, Census Tract 5.01	$26,211
7	East Salinas (Del Monte Ave.)	Block Group 3, Census Tract 7.01	$26,771
8	East Salinas (Del Monte Ave.)	Block Group 2, Census Tract 7.02	$26,875
9	Hebbron Heights, East Salinas	Block Group 1, Census Tract 5.01	$28,750
10	Downtown Monterey	Block Group 2, Census Tract 127	$29,070
11	West Santa Rita, Salinas	Block Group 1, Census Tract 105.06	$30,250
12	North-Central Salinas/Chinatown	Block Group 2, Census Tract 18.02	$30,625
13	Central King City	Block Group 2, Census Tract 113.02	$31,579
14	Central King City	Block Group 1, Census Tract 113.02	$33,043
15	Central Soledad	Block Group 3, Census Tract 111.01	$33,110
16	East Seaside	Block Group 1, Census Tract 135	$33,242
17	East Salinas (Del Monte Ave.)	Block Group 3, Census Tract 7.02	$33,244
18	East Soledad	Block Group 1, Census Tract 111.02	$33,616
19	East Salinas	Block Group 3, Census Tract 8	$33,938
20	North Salinas (E. Bernal Drive./Natividad Rd.)	Block Group 3, Census Tract 4	$34,057
86*	United States	N/A	$53,046
118*	California	N/A	$61,094
73*	City of Salinas	N/A	$49,264

* Asterisk denotes a hypothetical rank among Monterey County's 226 Census Block Groups (e.g. if the U.S. overall was a Census Block Group in Monterey County, it would be the 86th poorest of 226).

=== 2010 census ===
The 2010 United States census reported that Monterey County had a population of 415,057. The racial makeup of Monterey County was 230,717 (55.6%) White, 12,785 (3.1%) African American, 5,464 (1.3%) Native American, 25,258 (6.1%) Asian (2.8% Filipino, 0.7% Korean, 0.6% Chinese, 0.6% Japanese, 0.4% Vietnamese, 0.4% Indian), 2,071 (0.5%) Pacific Islander, 117,405 (28.3%) from other races, and 21,357 (5.1%) from two or more races. Hispanic or Latino of any race were 230,003 persons (55.4%); 50.2% of Monterey County is Mexican, 0.8% Salvadoran, and 0.5% Puerto Rican.

Population reported at 2010 United States census
The County	Total Population	White	African American	Native American	Asian	Pacific Islander	other races	two or more races	Hispanic or Latino (of any race)
Monterey County	415,057	230,717	12,785	5,464	25,258	2,071	117,405	21,357	230,003
Incorporated city	Total Population	White	African American	Native American	Asian	Pacific Islander	other races	two or more races	Hispanic or Latino (of any race)
Carmel-by-the-Sea	3,722	3,464	11	8	111	6	45	77	174
Del Rey Oaks	1,624	1,326	16	12	128	4	52	86	169
Gonzales	8,187	3,464	81	124	190	14	3,958	356	7,276
Greenfield	16,330	5,976	183	878	179	13	8,453	648	14,917
King City	12,874	6,173	150	347	172	8	5,451	573	11,266
Marina	19,718	8,904	1,487	140	3,931	544	2,738	1,974	5,372
Monterey	27,810	21,788	777	149	2,204	91	1,382	1,419	3,817
Pacific Grove	15,041	12,710	199	78	872	49	469	664	1,615
Salinas	150,441	68,973	2,993	1,888	9,438	478	59,041	7,630	112,799
Sand City	334	223	13	3	16	1	61	17	123
Seaside	33,025	15,978	2,783	347	3,206	529	7,579	2,603	14,347
Soledad	25,738	12,625	2,945	367	757	103	8,189	752	18,308
Census-designated place	Total Population	White	African American	Native American	Asian	Pacific Islander	other races	two or more races	Hispanic or Latino (of any race)
Aromas‡	1,358	1,026	7	24	35	1	194	71	511
Boronda	1,710	661	10	26	116	7	774	116	1,457
Bradley	93	85	0	2	0	0	5	1	11
Carmel Valley	4,407	6,189	21	22	70	11	120	119	328
Carmel Valley Village	4,407	4,044	21	22	70	11	120	119	328
Castroville	6,481	2,807	96	96	169	9	2,955	349	5,841
Chualar	1,190	337	1	2	11	0	827	12	1,151
Del Monte Forest	4,514	3,922	43	10	388	3	57	91	167
Elkhorn	1,565	1,122	9	7	63	3	286	75	588
Las Lomas	3,024	1,167	37	93	53	24	1,490	160	2,696
Lockwood	379	297	4	6	2	0	56	14	100
Moss Landing	204	149	7	1	2	1	30	14	46
Pajaro	3,070	1,451	15	78	53	0	1,281	192	2,889
Pine Canyon	1,822	1,173	29	15	18	0	490	97	984
Prunedale	17,560	11,771	177	199	672	58	3,639	1,044	7,322
San Ardo	517	252	1	3	5	0	245	11	363
San Lucas	269	113	0	4	6	0	127	19	224
Spreckels	673	483	0	13	26	0	130	21	193
Other unincorporated areas	Total Population	White	African American	Native American	Asian	Pacific Islander	other races	two or more races	Hispanic or Latino (of any race)
All others not CDPs (combined)	51,377	38,253	690	522	2,365	114	7,281	2,152	14,949
‡ Note: these numbers reflect only the portion of this CDP in Monterey County

=== 2000 census ===
As of the census of 2000, there were 401,762 people, 121,236 households, and 87,896 families residing in the county. The population density was 121 people per square mile (47 people/km^{2}). There were 131,708 housing units at an average density of 40 units per square mile (15 units/km^{2}). The racial makeup of the county was 55.9% White, 3.8% Black or African American, 1.1% Native American, 6.0% Asian, 0.5% Pacific Islander, 27.8% from other races, and 5.0% from two or more races. 46.79% of the population were Hispanic or Latino of any race. 6.3% were of German and 5.4% English ancestry according to Census 2000. 52.9% spoke English, 39.6% Spanish and 1.6% Tagalog as their first language.

There were 121,236 households, out of which 39.1% had children under the age of 18 living with them, 56.0% were married couples living together, 11.6% had a female householder with no husband present, and 27.5% were non-families. 21.2% of all households were made up of individuals, and 8.2% had someone living alone who was 65 years of age or older. The average household size was 3.14 and the average family size was 3.65.

In the county, the population was spread out, with 28.4% under the age of 18, 10.9% from 18 to 24, 31.4% from 25 to 44, 19.3% from 45 to 64, and 10.0% who were 65 years of age or older. The median age was 32 years. For every 100 female residents there were 107.3 male residents. For every 100 female residents age 18 and over, there were 107.7 male residents.

The median income for a household in the county was $48,305, and the median income for a family was $51,169. Men had a median income of $38,444 versus $30,036 for the women. The per capita income for the county was $20,165. About 9.7% of families and 13.5% of the population were below the poverty line, including 17.4% of those under age 18 and 6.8% of those age 65 or over.

== Government policing and politics ==
The government of Monterey County operates as a general law county, defined and authorized under the California Constitution and law. It does not have a county charter.

It is governed by the Monterey County Board of Supervisors. Like all governing bodies in California, the Monterey County Board of Supervisors is empowered with both legislative and executive authority over the entirety of Monterey County and is the primary governing body for all unincorporated areas within the County boundaries. The Board has five elected members, each of whom represents one of five districts. Taken together, the five districts comprise the entirety of the county.

Current board members:

- Luis Alejo - 1st District
- Glenn Church - 2nd District
- Chris Lopez - 3rd District
- Wendy Root Askew - 4th District
- Mary Adams - 5th District

The Board conducts its meetings in the county seat, Salinas, and is a member of the regional governmental agency, the Association of Monterey Bay Area Governments.

=== Supervisorial districts ===
Supervisorial district boundaries are divided roughly equally according to population, using data from the most recent census. In addition, any redistricting changes should approximately comply with both California law as well as the federal Voting Rights Act. Boundaries are adjusted decennially based on data reported by the United States Census Bureau for the most recent census. The next supervisorial election will be held on March 8, 2022.

==== District 1 ====
The 1st District is geographically the smallest supervisorial district in Monterey County and is entirely within the city limits of the city of Salinas.

Luis Alejo represents the 1st District on the Board of Supervisors. His current term expires in December 2024.

==== District 2 ====
As the northernmost supervisorial district in Monterey County, the 2nd District includes the communities of Boronda, Castroville, Las Lomas, Moss Landing, Pajaro, Prunedale, Royal Oaks, the northern neighborhoods of the city of Salinas, and those portions of the community of Aromas that are located within Monterey County.

John Phillips is currently the Supervisor for the 2nd District. His current term expires in December 2026.

==== District 3 ====
The 3rd District covers the majority of the Salinas Valley and southern Monterey County, extending to its border with San Luis Obispo County. The district includes the unincorporated communities of Spreckels, Chualar, and Jolon; the eastern portion of the city of Salinas; the cities of Gonzales, Greenfield, Soledad, and King City; the military installations at Fort Hunter Liggett and Camp Roberts; and portions of the Los Padres National Forest.

The 3rd District is represented by Chris Lopez. His current term expires in December 2026.

==== District 4 ====
The 4th District includes the southwest portion of the city of Salinas, the cities of Del Rey Oaks, Marina, Seaside, Sand City, and the former military installation at Fort Ord.

Wendy Root Askew currently holds the seat for 4th District Supervisor. Her current term expires in December 2024.

==== District 5 ====
The 5th District is geographically the largest of the five supervisorial districts, and covers most of the Monterey Peninsula and southern coastline of Monterey County down to the southern county border with San Luis Obispo County. The 5th District includes the cities of Carmel-by-the-Sea, Monterey, and Pacific Grove; the unincorporated communities of Carmel Valley, Big Sur, Pebble Beach, San Benancio, Corral de Tierra, and Jamesburg; military installations at the Presidio of Monterey, the Defense Language Institute, and the Naval Postgraduate School; and the Ventana Wilderness area of the Los Padres National Forest.

Mary L. Adams is currently the 5th District Supervisor. Her current term expires in December 2024.

=== State and federal representatives ===
In the United States House of Representatives, Monterey County is split between two districts:

- California's 18th congressional district, represented by Democrat Zoe Lofgren, and
- California's 19th congressional district, represented by Democrat Jimmy Panetta.

In the California State Assembly, Monterey County is split between the 29th Assembly district, represented by Democrat Robert Rivas, and the 30th Assembly district, represented by Democrat Dawn Addis.

In the California State Senate, Monterey County in the 17th senatorial district, represented by Democrat John Laird.

=== Policing ===
The Monterey County Sheriff provides court protection, jail management, and coroner service for the entire county, in addition to patrol and detective services for the unincorporated areas of the county. Incorporated municipalities within the county that have their own municipal police departments are: Monterey, Pacific Grove, Salinas, King City, Marina, Seaside, Sand City, and Gonzales.

== Politics ==
=== Voter registration ===
Population and registered voters
Total population	411,385	
Registered voters (Note: Percentage of registered voters with respect to total population. Percentages of party members with respect to registered voters follow.)	168,245	40.9%
Democratic	87,040	51.7%
Republican	40,721	24.2%
Democratic–Republican spread	+46,319	+27.5%
American Independent	3,927	2.3%
Green	1,129	0.7%
Libertarian	852	0.5%
Peace and Freedom	392	0.2%
Americans Elect	12	0.0%
Other	241	0.1%
No party preference	33,931	20.2%

==== Cities by population and voter registration ====
Cities by population and voter registration
City	Population	Registered voters	Democratic	Republican	D–R spread	Other	No party preference
Carmel-by-the-Sea	3,728	74.8%	40.5%	33.6%	+6.9%	8.8%	20.4%
Del Rey Oaks	1,734	65.1%	47.9%	26.4%	+21.5%	6.6%	21.8%
Gonzales	8,074	34.6%	66.8%	14.0%	+52.8%	5.4%	15.9%
Greenfield	15,864	26.3%	70.3%	11.6%	+58.7%	3.3%	16.0%
King City	12,629	21.6%	58.7%	22.6%	+36.1%	4.1%	16.2%
Marina	19,636	46.4%	48.2%	21.8%	+26.4%	7.9%	25.1%
Monterey	27,861	49.8%	47.4%	24.6%	+22.8%	7.1%	23.4%
Pacific Grove	14,995	64.0%	49.1%	23.6%	+25.5%	7.6%	22.3%
Salinas	148,780	34.1%	60.2%	18.8%	+41.4%	4.6%	18.2%
Sand City	292	51.0%	37.6%	24.8%	+12.8%	14.1%	29.5%
Seaside	32,735	35.6%	54.1%	18.9%	+35.2%	6.7%	22.9%
Soledad	25,548	19.5%	67.9%	11.4%	+56.5%	4.0%	18.1%

=== Overview ===
For most of the 20th century, Monterey County was a Republican stronghold in presidential elections. From 1900 until 1992, the only Democrats to carry the county were Woodrow Wilson, Franklin Roosevelt, and Lyndon Johnson. Since 1992, the county has favored the Democratic Party in Presidential and congressional elections, with George H. W. Bush in 1988 being the last Republican to win Monterey County.

United States presidential election results for Monterey County, California (Note: This total comprised 3,081 votes for Progressive Theodore Roosevelt (who was official Republican nominee in California), 557 votes for Socialist Eugene V. Debs and 301 votes for Prohibition Party nominee Eugene W. Chafin.)
Year	Republican		Democratic		Third party(ies)	
Year	No.	%	No.	%	No.	%
1880	1,260	50.36%	1,205	48.16%	37	1.48%
1884	1,476	50.72%	1,381	47.46%	53	1.82%
1888	1,875	48.55%	1,866	48.32%	121	3.13%
1892	1,709	41.65%	1,606	39.14%	788	19.21%
1896	1,878	45.82%	2,149	52.43%	72	1.76%
1900	1,964	50.10%	1,825	46.56%	131	3.34%
1904	2,453	59.17%	1,415	34.13%	278	6.71%
1908	2,486	53.64%	1,616	34.87%	533	11.50%
1912	1	0.01%	3,392	46.26%	3,939	53.72%
1916	3,599	44.81%	3,878	48.28%	555	6.91%
1920	4,817	67.76%	1,771	24.91%	521	7.33%
1924	4,744	61.07%	886	11.41%	2,138	27.52%
1928	7,228	63.12%	4,138	36.13%	86	0.75%
1932	6,200	39.37%	8,942	56.77%	608	3.86%
1936	7,565	37.70%	12,267	61.13%	235	1.17%
1940	11,810	44.01%	14,758	55.00%	265	0.99%
1944	12,246	45.82%	14,342	53.66%	140	0.52%
1948	17,233	50.59%	15,704	46.10%	1,126	3.31%
1952	30,578	62.51%	18,051	36.90%	286	0.58%
1956	29,514	59.54%	19,932	40.21%	127	0.26%
1960	33,428	56.26%	25,805	43.43%	180	0.30%
1964	24,579	37.90%	40,093	61.83%	172	0.27%
1968	33,670	50.16%	28,261	42.10%	5,193	7.74%
1972	47,004	57.04%	32,545	39.49%	2,859	3.47%
1976	40,896	51.02%	36,849	45.97%	2,408	3.00%
1980	47,452	54.67%	29,086	33.51%	10,256	11.82%
1984	55,710	57.16%	40,733	41.79%	1,027	1.05%
1988	50,022	49.83%	48,998	48.81%	1,361	1.36%
1992	36,461	31.25%	54,861	47.01%	25,367	21.74%
1996	39,794	36.66%	57,700	53.15%	11,064	10.19%
2000	43,761	37.23%	67,618	57.53%	6,155	5.24%
2004	47,838	38.38%	75,241	60.36%	1,574	1.26%
2008	38,797	29.89%	88,453	68.15%	2,533	1.95%
2012	37,390	30.27%	82,920	67.13%	3,208	2.60%
2016	34,895	26.16%	89,088	66.78%	9,425	7.06%
2020	46,299	28.24%	113,953	69.52%	3,671	2.24%
2024	49,226	33.54%	93,060	63.41%	4,468	3.04%

According to the California Secretary of State, as of April 2008, Monterey County had 147,066 registered voters. Of those voters, 72,550 (49.3%) were registered Democratic, 42,744 (29.1%) were registered Republican, 5,488 (3.7%) were registered with other political parties, and 26,284 (17.9%) declined to state a political party. Except for Sand City, all of the other cities, towns, and the unincorporated area of Monterey County had more individuals registered with the Democratic Party than the Republican Party. In Sand City, the Republicans held the advantage by a single voter.

In August 2018, the county adopted a flag designed by a Watsonville resident.

== Crime ==
The following table includes the number of incidents reported and the rate per 1,000 persons for each type of offense.

Population and crime rates
Population	411,385	
Violent crime	2,118	5.15
Homicide	51	0.12
Forcible rape	125	0.30
Robbery	657	1.60
Aggravated assault	1,285	3.12
Property crime	6,885	16.74
Burglary	3,151	7.66
Larceny-theft	6,245	15.18
Motor vehicle theft	1,808	4.39
Arson	90	0.22

=== Cities by population and crime rates ===
Cities by population and crime rates
City	Population	Violent crimes	Violent crime rate per 1,000 persons	Property crimes	Property crime rate per 1,000 persons
Carmel	3,822	7	1.83	99	25.90
Del Rey Oaks	1,668	2	1.20	37	22.18
Gonzales	8,404	36	4.28	102	12.14
Greenfield	16,765	120	7.16	306	18.25
King City	13,214	54	4.09	332	25.12
Marina	30,227	191	6.03	1,347	24.62
Monterey	28,508	153	5.37	1,016	35.64
Pacific Grove	15,437	27	1.75	249	16.13
Salinas	154,413	1,027	6.65	4,906	31.77
Sand City	343	7	20.41	76	221.57
Seaside	33,887	109	3.22	499	14.73
Soledad	26,253	80	3.05	284	10.82

== Media ==
Television service for the community comes from the Monterey-Salinas-Santa Cruz designated market area (DMA). Radio stations Monterey-Salinas-Santa Cruz area of dominant influence (ADI) or continuous measurement market (CMM). Local newspapers include the Monterey County Herald, Monterey County Weekly, Salinas Californian and the Carmel Pine Cone.

== Home prices ==
As of December 2005, Monterey County ranked among America's ten most expensive counties, with Santa Barbara County topping the list with a median home price of $753,790. In Monterey County, the median home price was $699,900. In the northern, more densely populated part in the county, the median home price was even higher, at $712,500, making it the fourth most expensive housing market in California. The disparity between the median household income of roughly $48,305 and the median home price of $700k has been cause for recent concern over excluding potential home buyers from the market. The end of the United States housing bubble has caused prices to drop substantially, with median home prices having fallen to $280,000 as at September 2008.

== Transportation ==
=== Major highways ===
- U.S. Route 101
- State Route 1
- State Route 25
- State Route 68
- State Route 146
- State Route 156
- State Route 183
- State Route 198
- State Route 218

=== Public transportation ===
Monterey County is served by Amtrak trains and Greyhound Lines buses. Monterey-Salinas Transit provides transit service throughout most of Monterey County, with buses to Big Sur and King City as well as in Monterey, Salinas and Carmel. MST also runs service to San Jose, California in Santa Clara County.

=== Airports ===
- Monterey Regional Airport is located just east of the city of Monterey, California. Commercial flights are available.
- Marina Municipal Airport is located in the city of Marina, California.
- Salinas Municipal Airport is located in the southeast part of Salinas, California.
- Mesa Del Rey Airport is located in the city of King City, California.

== Communities ==
=== Cities ===
- Carmel-by-the-Sea
- Del Rey Oaks
- Gonzales
- Greenfield
- King City
- Marina
- Monterey
- Pacific Grove
- Salinas (county seat)
- Sand City
- Seaside
- Soledad

=== Census-designated places ===
- Aromas
- Boronda
- Bradley
- Carmel Valley Village
- Castroville
- Chualar
- Del Monte Forest, includes the well-known community of Pebble Beach
- Elkhorn
- Fort Hunter Liggett
- Las Lomas
- Lockwood
- Moss Landing
- Pajaro
- Pine Canyon
- Prunedale
- San Ardo
- San Lucas
- Spreckels

=== Unincorporated communities ===
- Ambler Park
- Big Sur Village
- Bryson
- Cachagua
- Carmel Highlands
- Carmel Valley
- Corral de Tierra
- Gorda
- Jamesburg
- Jolon
- Notleys Landing
- Old Hilltown
- Pacific Grove Acres
- Parkfield
- Plaskett
- Posts
- Robles del Rio
- San Benancio
- Santa Lucia Preserve
- Slates Hot Springs
- Springtown
- Sycamore Flat
- Tassajara Hot Springs
- White Rock

=== Other places ===
- Big Sur
- Laguna Seca Ranch
- Fort Ord Military Base decommissioned in the 1990s, some of it was converted to California State University, Monterey Bay
- Naval Postgraduate School
- Fort Hunter Liggett
- Presidio of Monterey, home to the Defense Language Institute and one of three presidios in California
- Jacks Peak Park, including the highest point on the Monterey Peninsula

=== Population ranking ===
The population ranking of the following table is based on the 2020 census of Monterey County.

† county seat

Rank	City/Town/etc.	Municipal type	Population (2020 Census)
1	† Salinas	City	163,542
2	Seaside	City	32,366
3	Monterey	City	30,218
4	Soledad	City	24,925
5	Marina	City	22,359
6	Greenfield	City	18,937
7	Prunedale	CDP	18,885
8	Pacific Grove	City	15,090
9	King City	City	13,332
10	Gonzales	City	8,647
11	Castroville	CDP	7,515
12	Carmel Valley	CDP	6,189
13	Del Monte Forest	CDP	4,204
14	Carmel-by-the-Sea	City	3,220
15	Las Lomas	CDP	3,046
16	Pajaro	CDP	2,882
17	Aromas (partially in San Benito County)	CDP	2,708
18	Pine Canyon	CDP	1,871
19	Boronda	CDP	1,760
20	Del Rey Oaks	City	1,592
21	Elkhorn	CDP	1,588
22	Chualar	CDP	1,185
23	Spreckels	CDP	692
24	San Ardo	CDP	392
25	Lockwood	CDP	368
26	Sand City	City	325
27	San Lucas	CDP	324
28	Moss Landing	CDP	237
29	Bradley	CDP	69

== Education ==
School districts include:

Unified:

- Aromas-San Juan Unified School District
- Big Sur Unified School District
- Gonzales Unified School District - It serves grades PK-12 in some sections and grades 9–12 only in other sections
- Carmel Unified School District
- Coalinga-Huron Unified School District
- Monterey Peninsula Unified School District
- North Monterey County Unified School District
- Pacific Grove Unified School District
- Pajaro Valley Joint Unified School District
- Shandon Joint Unified School District
- Soledad Unified School District

Secondary:

- Paso Robles Joint Unified School District (While it is a K-12 unified school district, it only serves grades 9–12 in its section of this county)
- Salinas Union High School District
- South Monterey County Joint Union High School District

Elementary:

- Alisal Union School District
- Bradley Union Elementary School District
- Chualar Union Elementary School District
- Graves Elementary School District
- Greenfield Union Elementary School District
- King City Union Elementary School District
- Lagunita Elementary School District
- Mission Union Elementary School District
- Pleasant Valley Joint Union Elementary School District
- Salinas City Elementary School District
- San Antonio Union Elementary School District
- San Ardo Union Elementary School District
- San Lucas Union Elementary School District
- San Miguel Joint Union Elementary School District
- Santa Rita Union Elementary School District
- Spreckels Union Elementary School District
- Washington Union Elementary School District

== Gallery ==
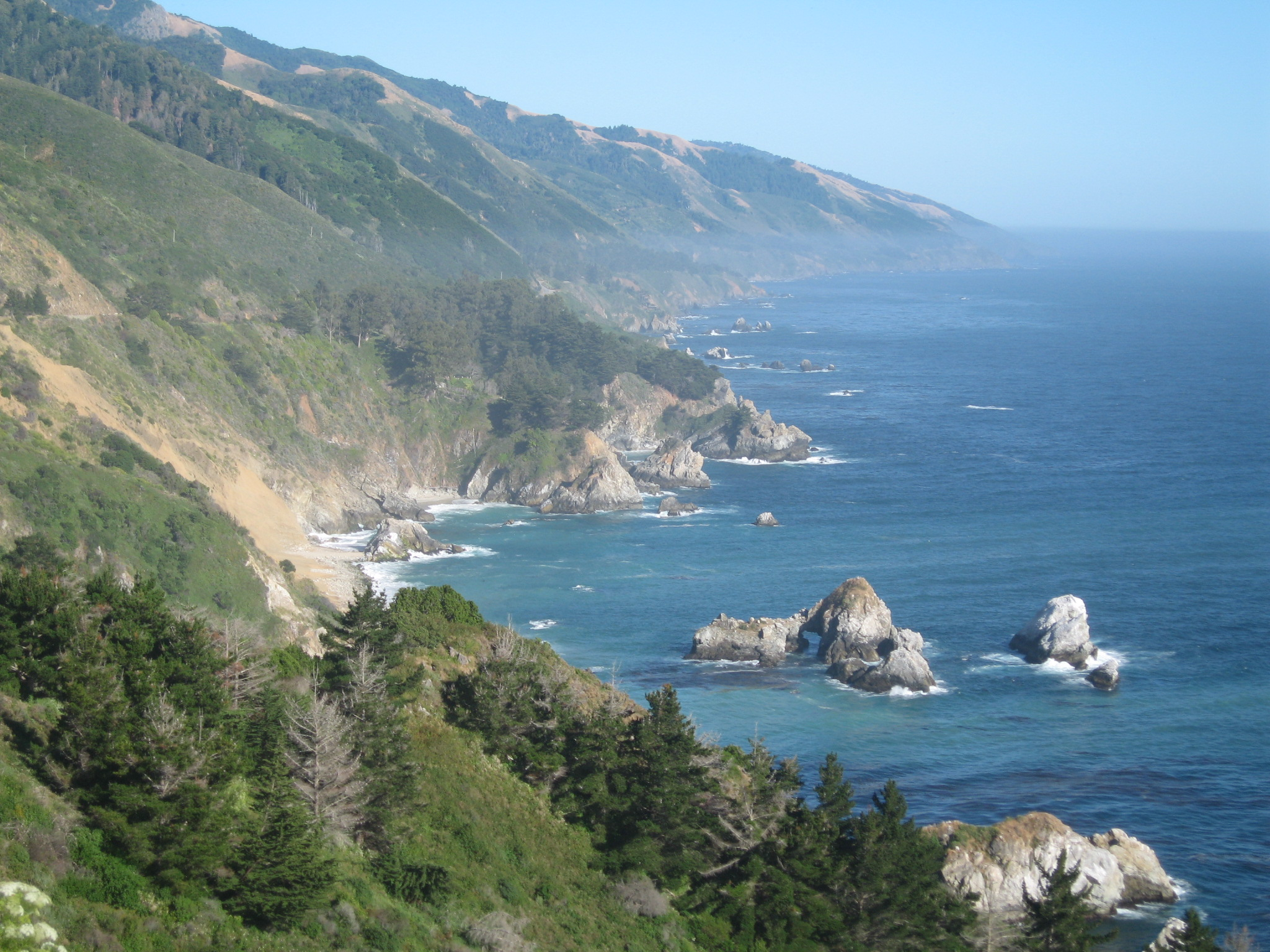
Big Sur - Midcounty coastline with the McWay Rocks in foreground

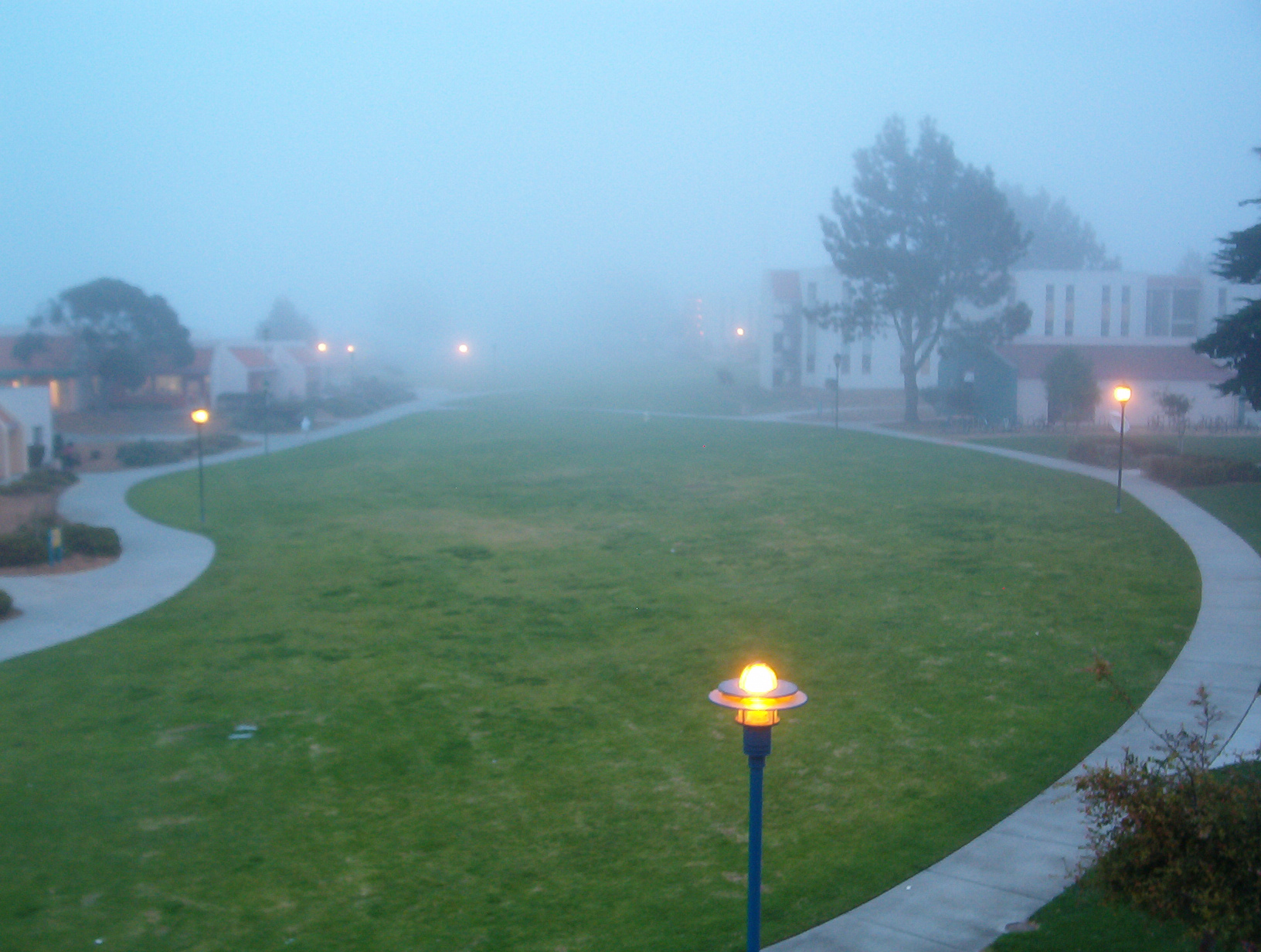
California State University at Monterey Bay

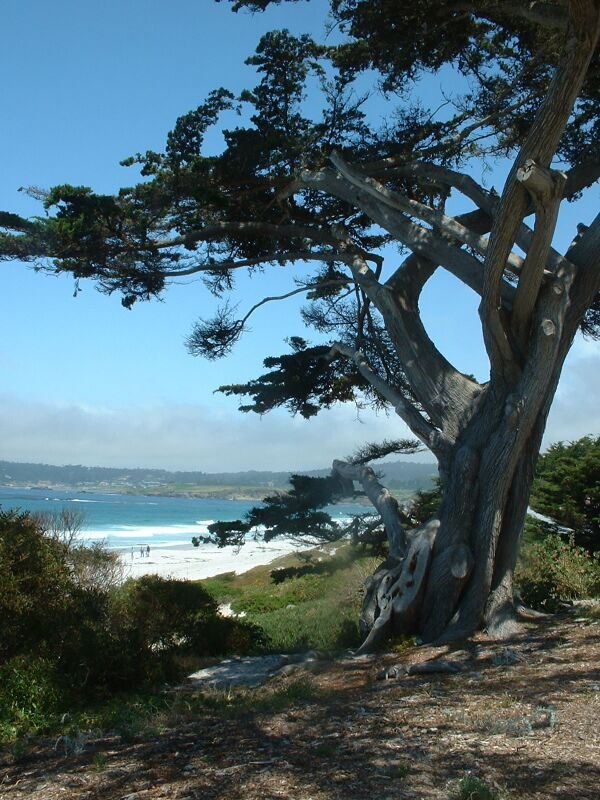
Carmel-by-the-Sea - Beach scene

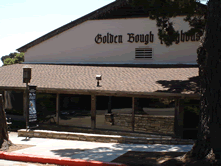
Carmel-by-the-Sea - Golden Bough Playhouse

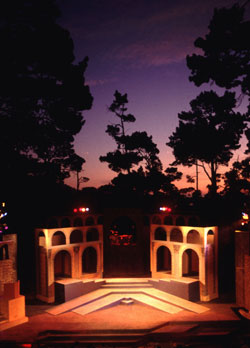
Carmel-by-the-Sea - Forest Theater

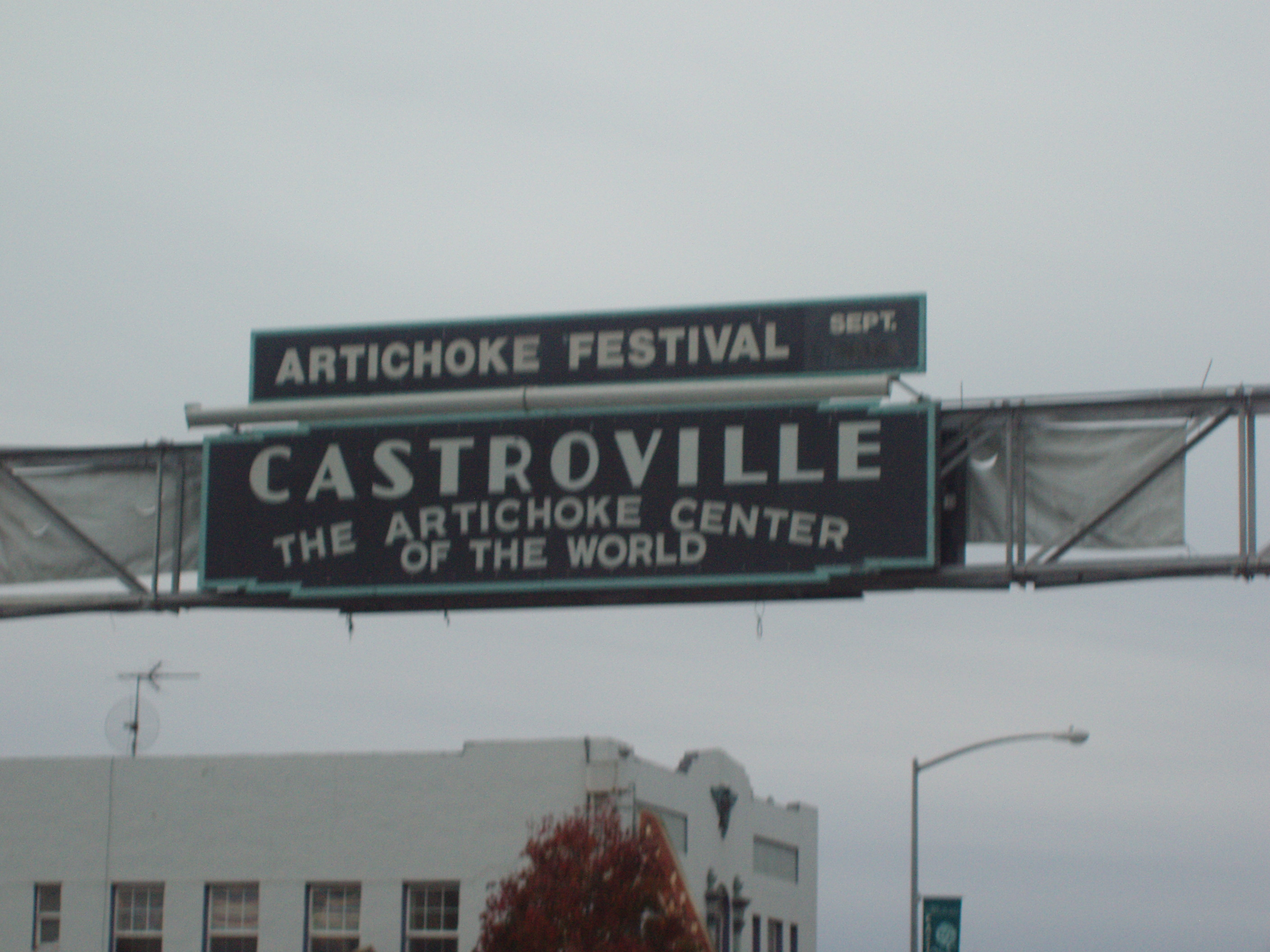
Castroville - Main entrance to the city

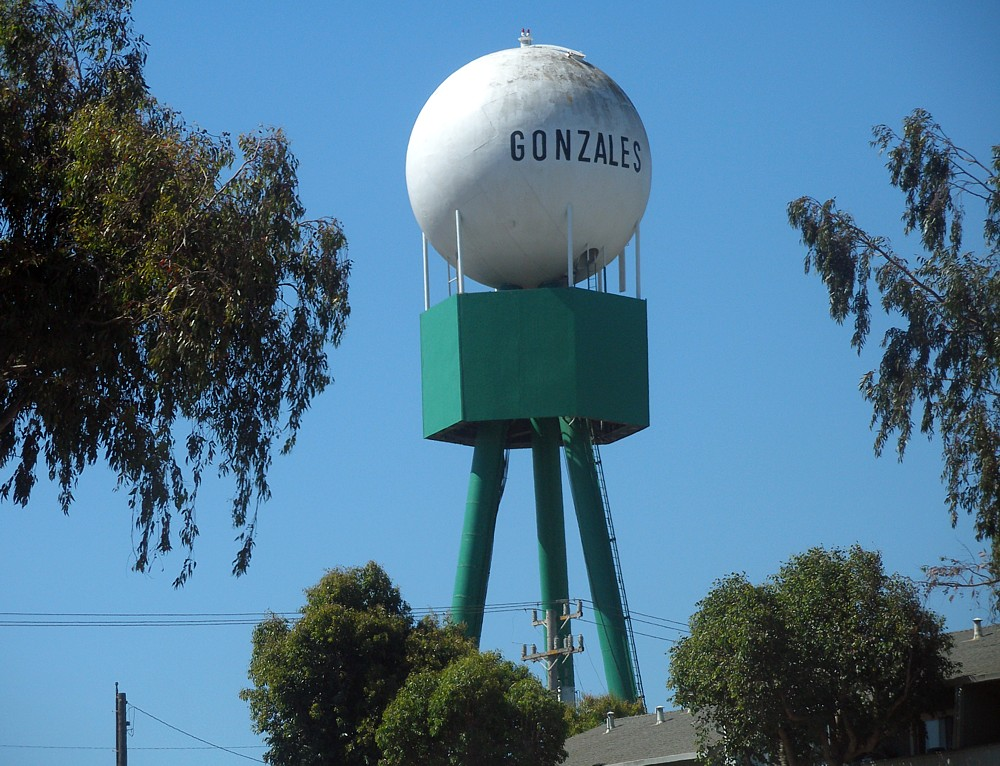
Gonzales - Water tower

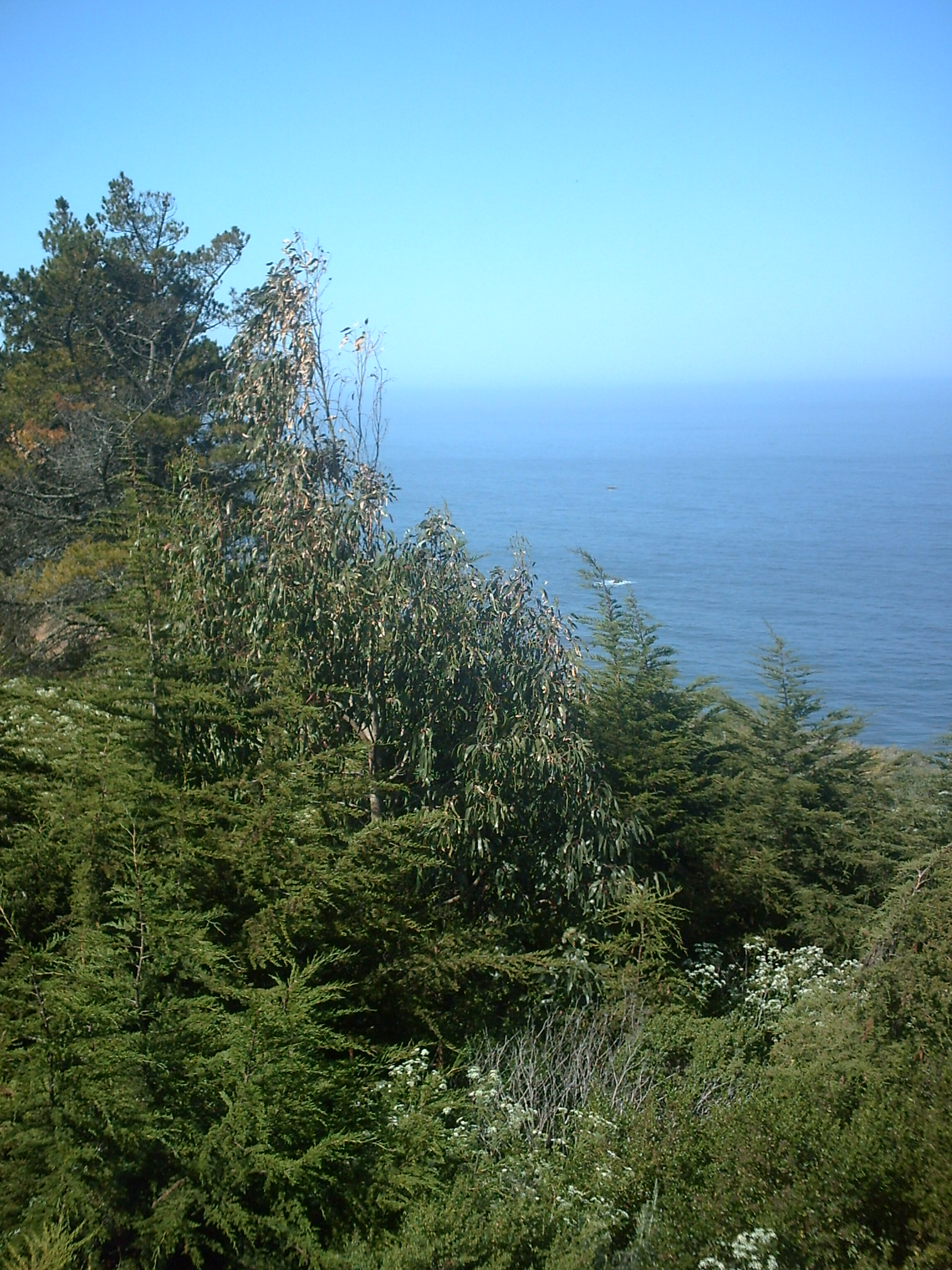
Gorda, California - A view of the Pacific Ocean

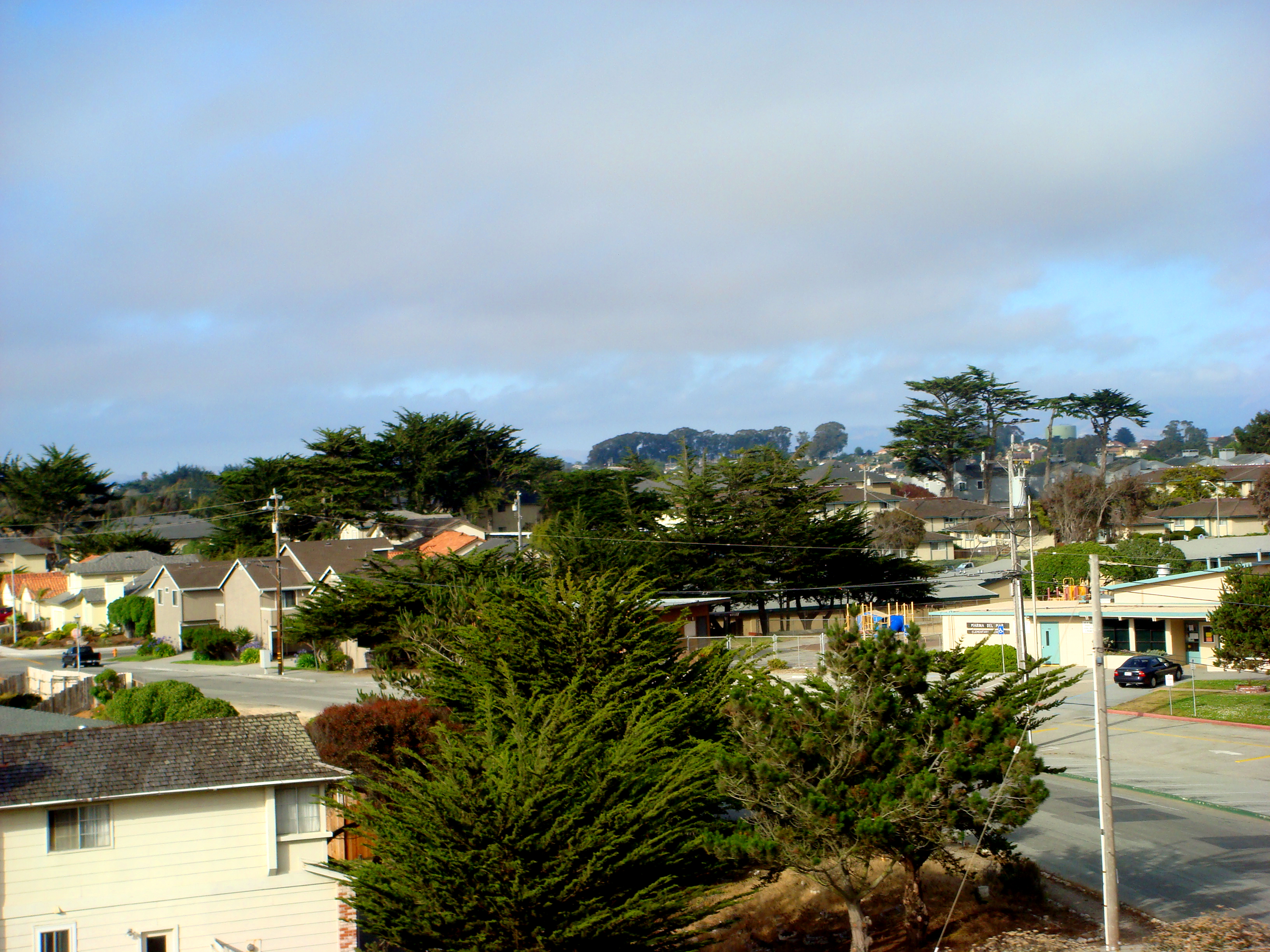
Marina neighborhood

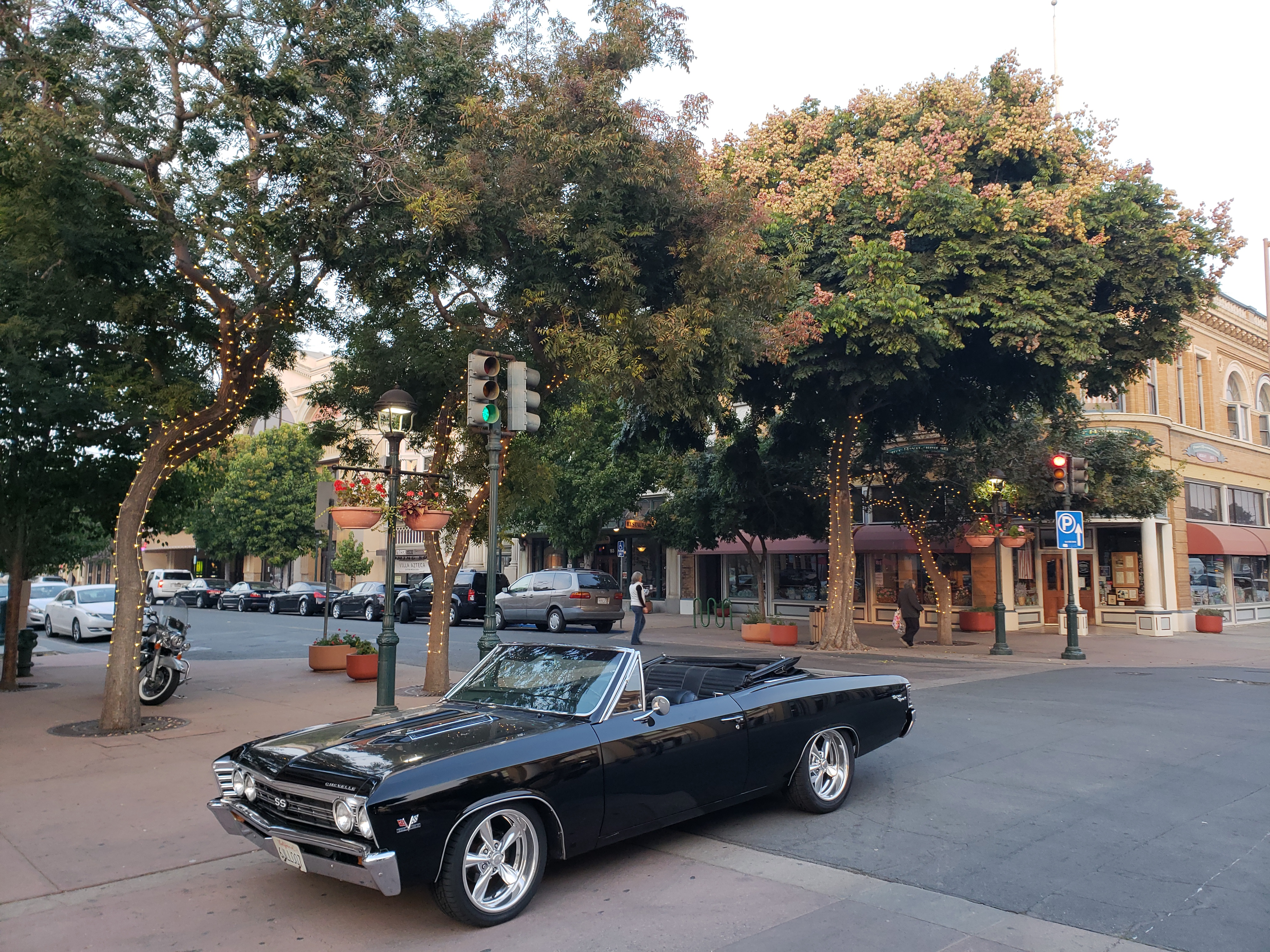
Main Street - Salinas

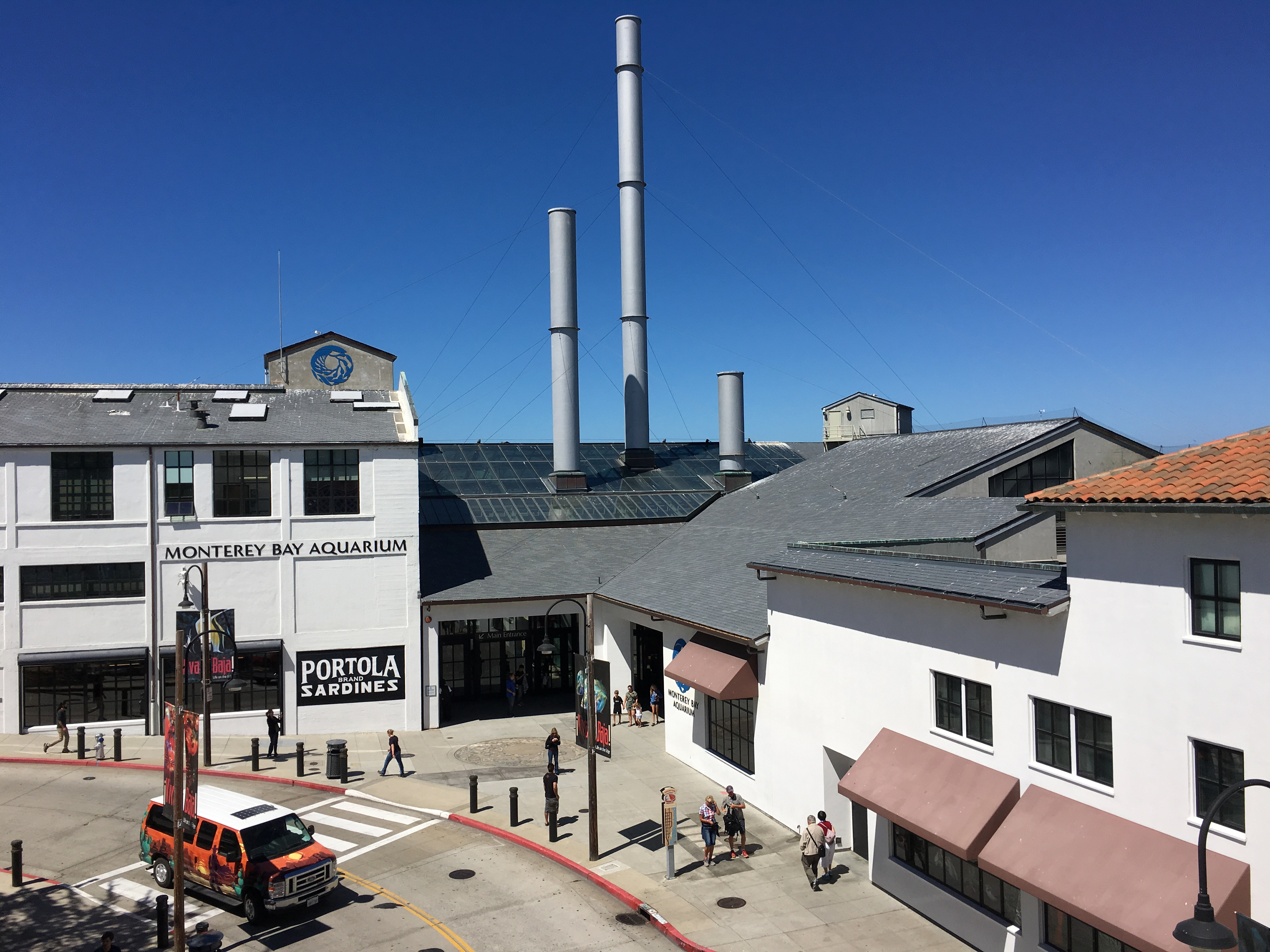
Monterey - Monterey Bay Aquarium

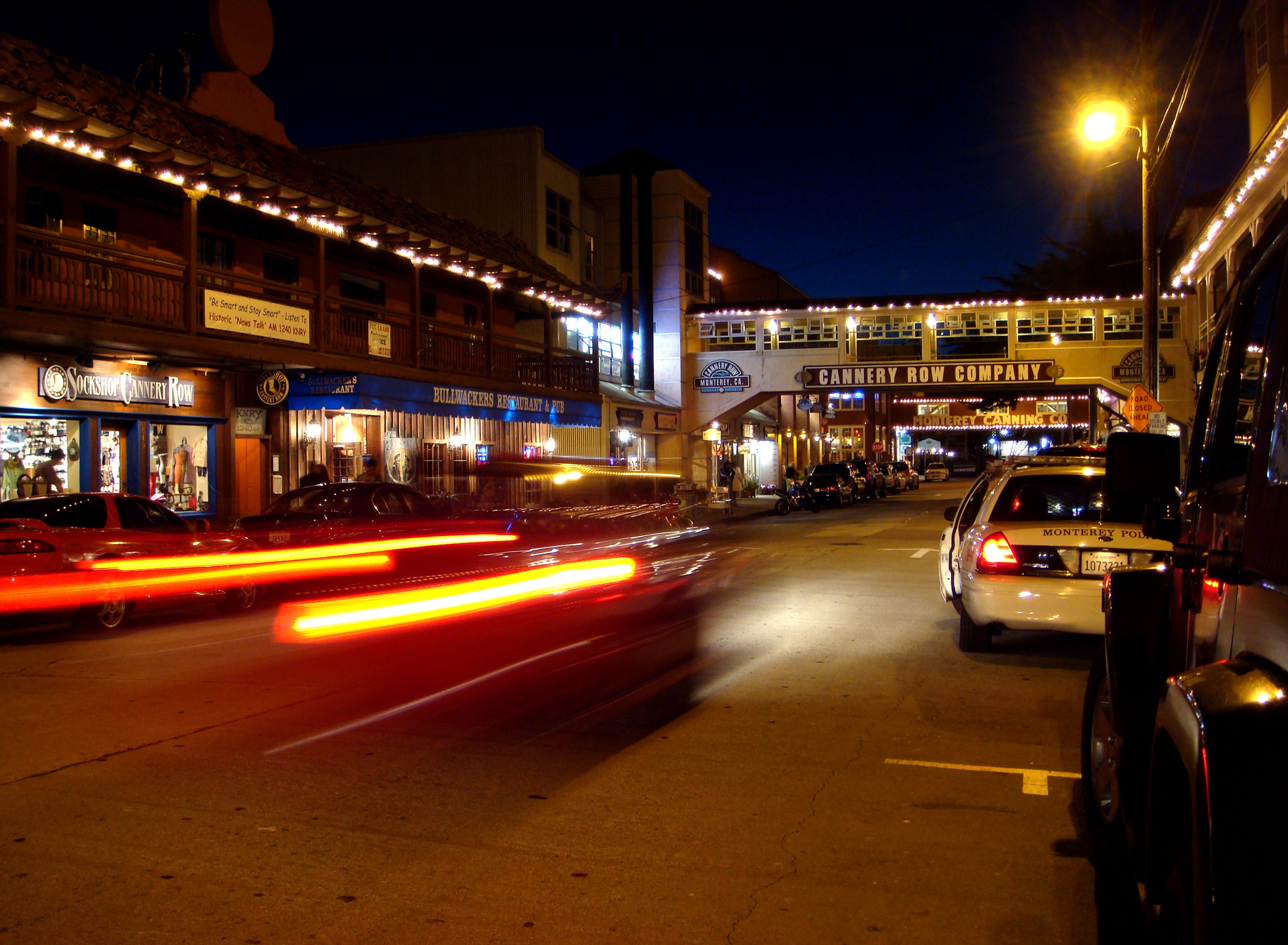
Monterey - Cannery Row

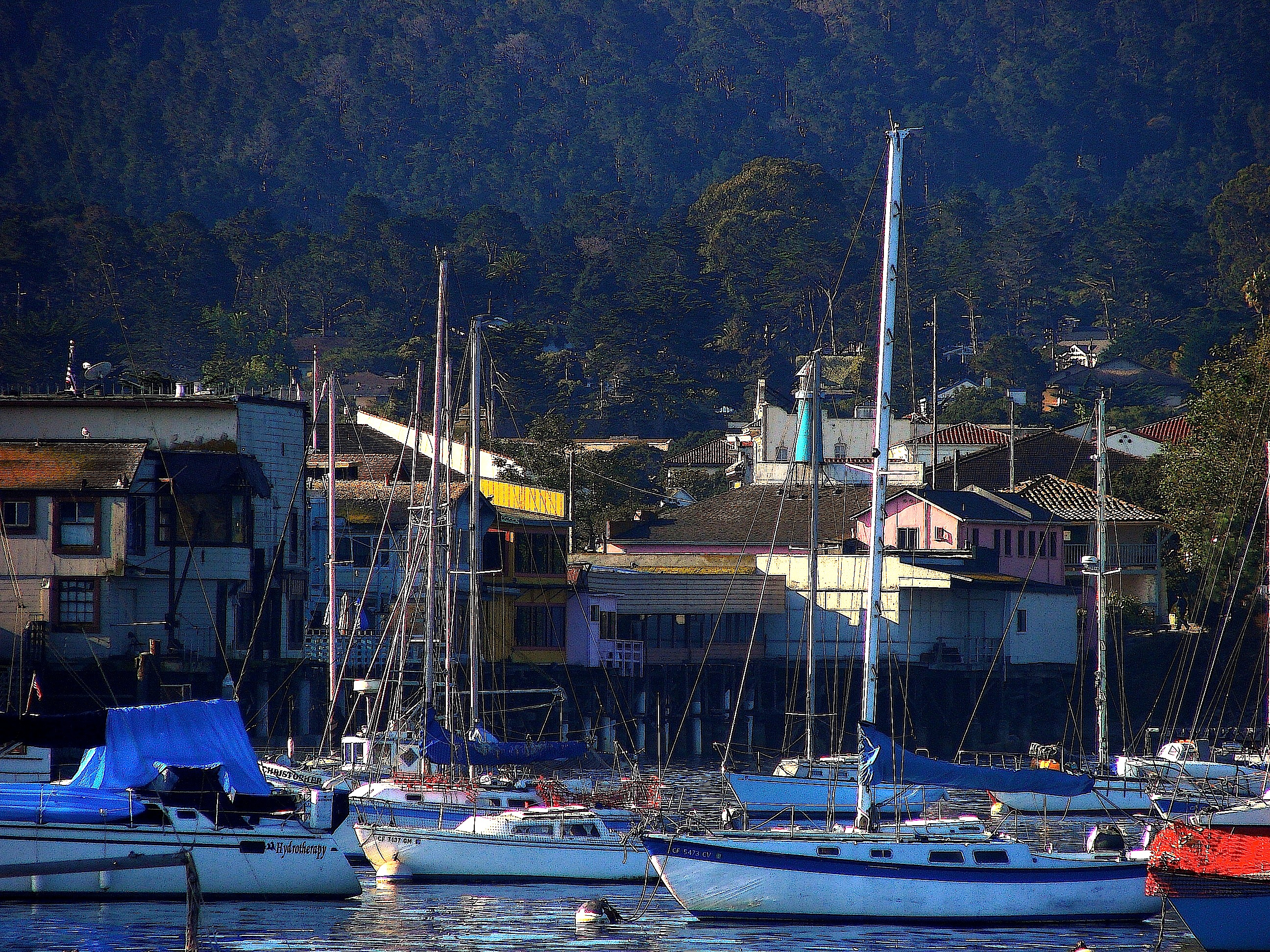
Monterey - Fisherman's Wharf

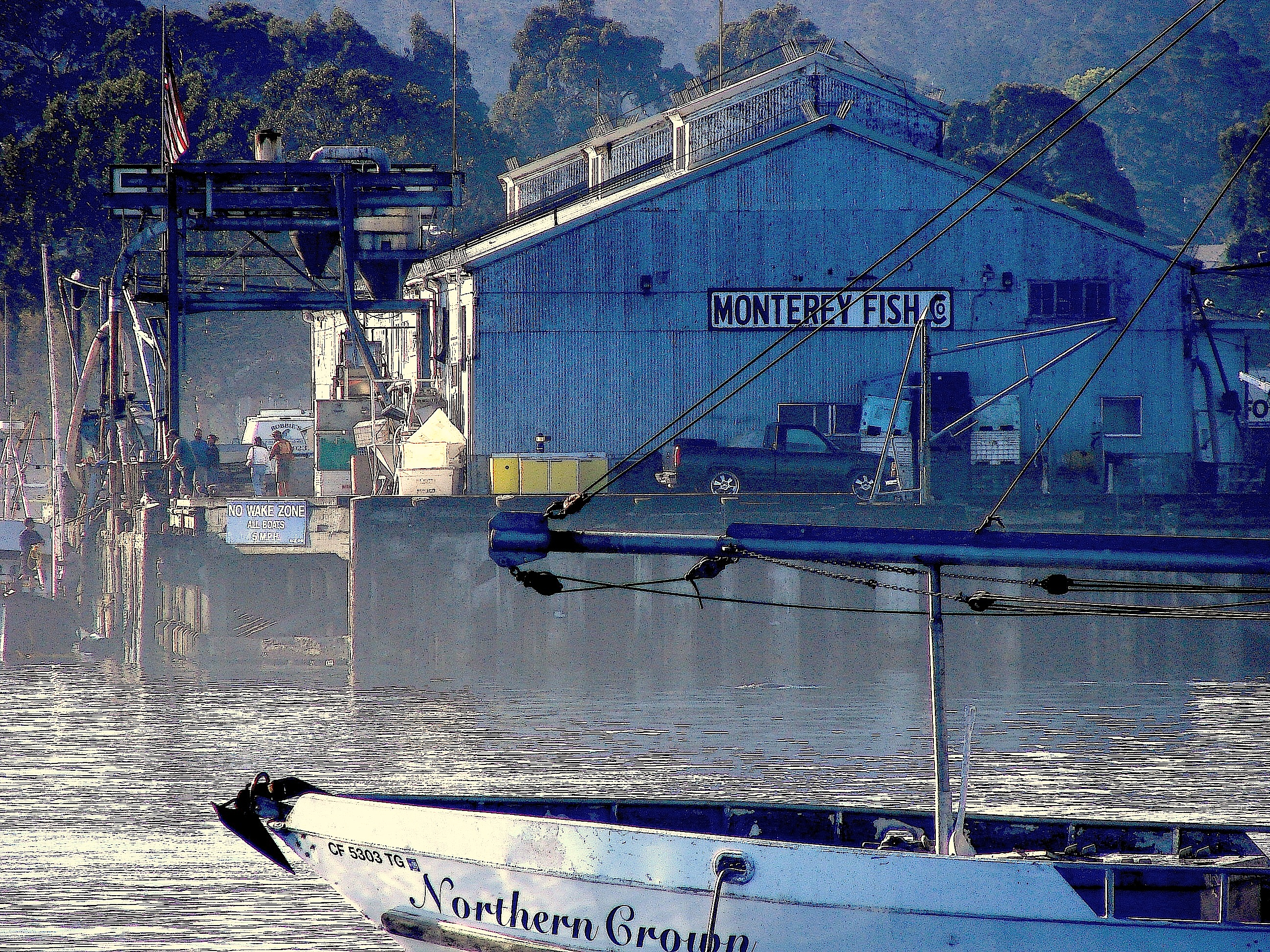
Monterey - Commercial Wharf

Hat in three stages of landing by Claes Oldemburg - Salinas

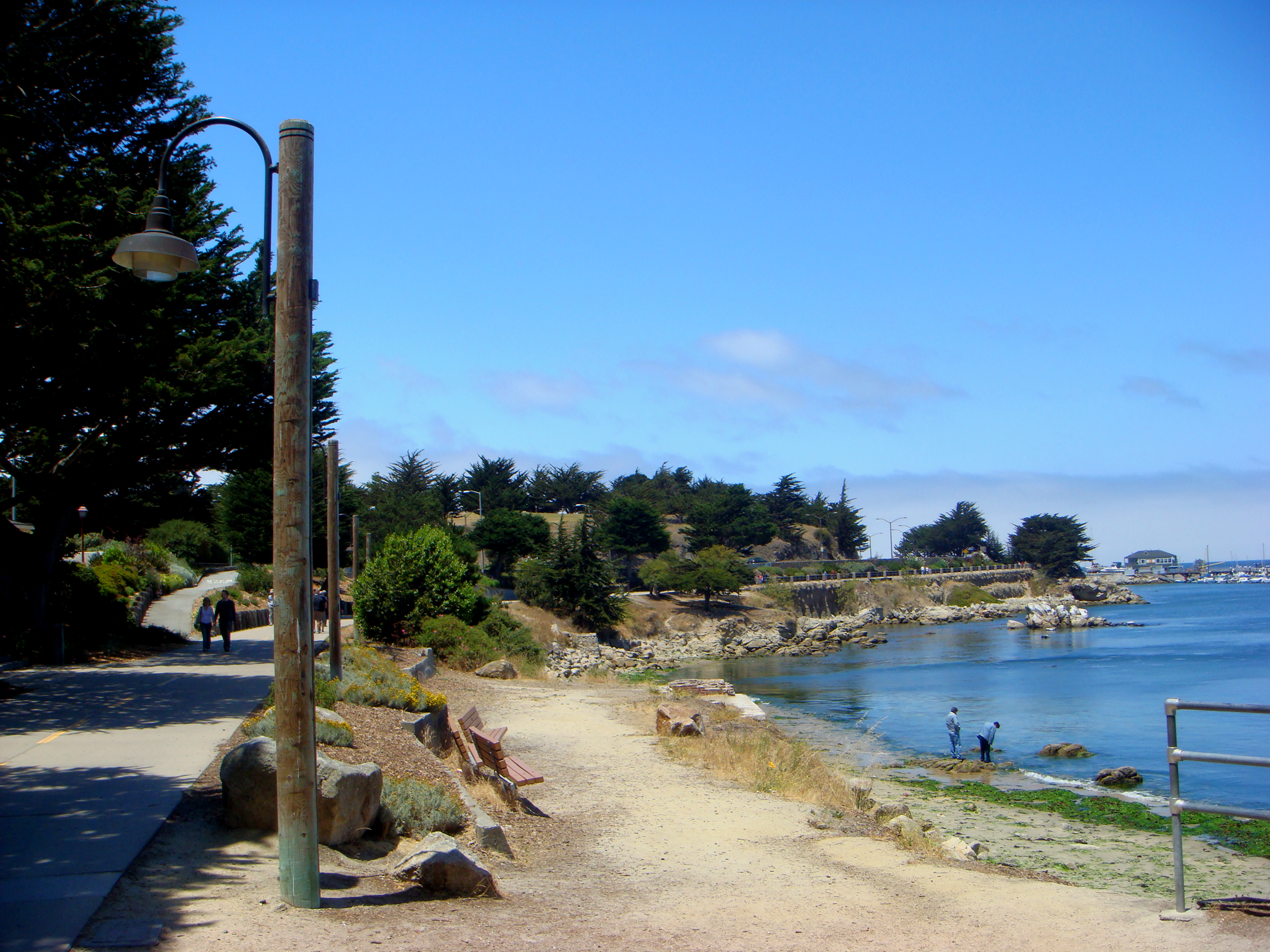
Monterey - Beachside recreational trail

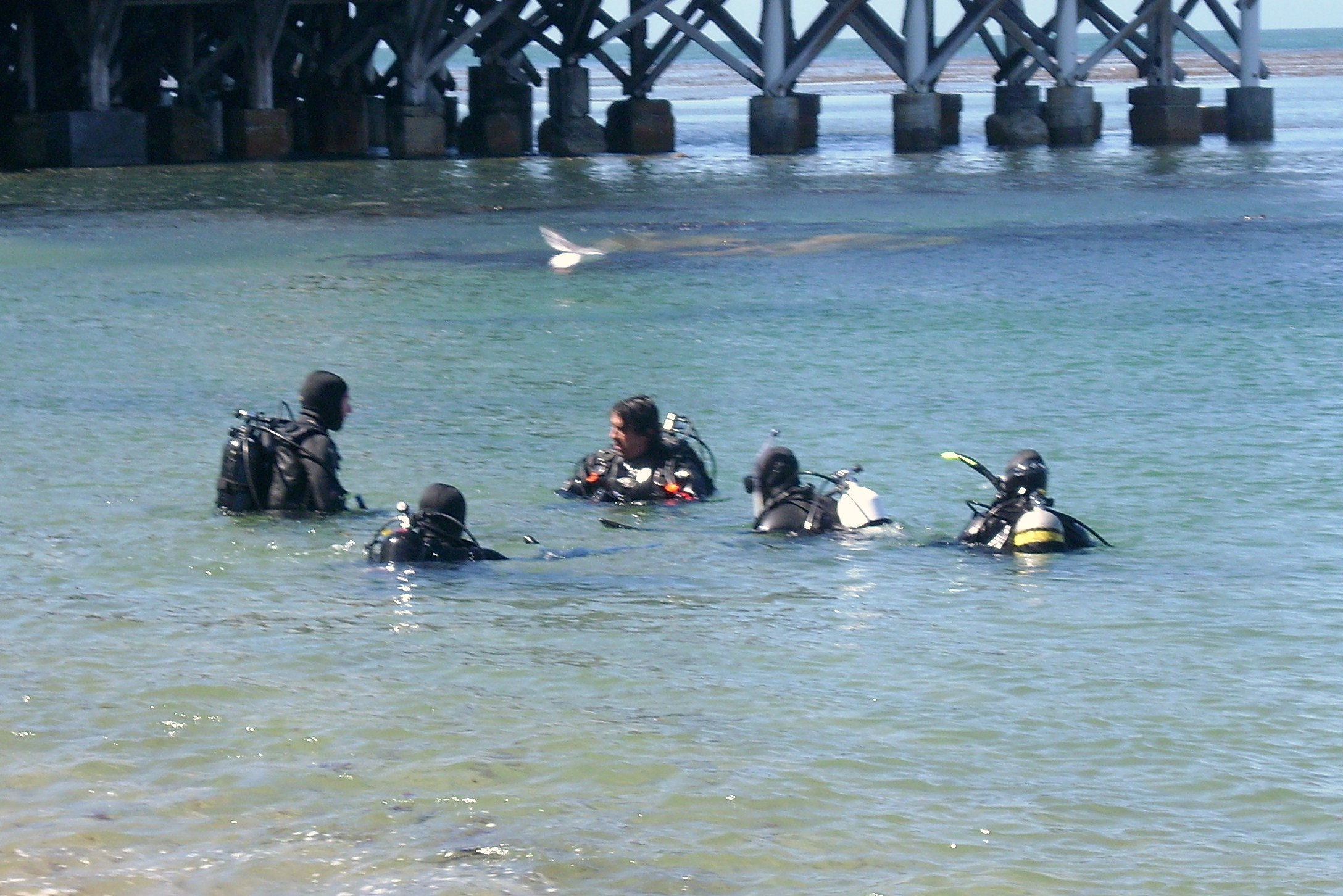
Monterey - Scuba diving lessons in Monterey Bay

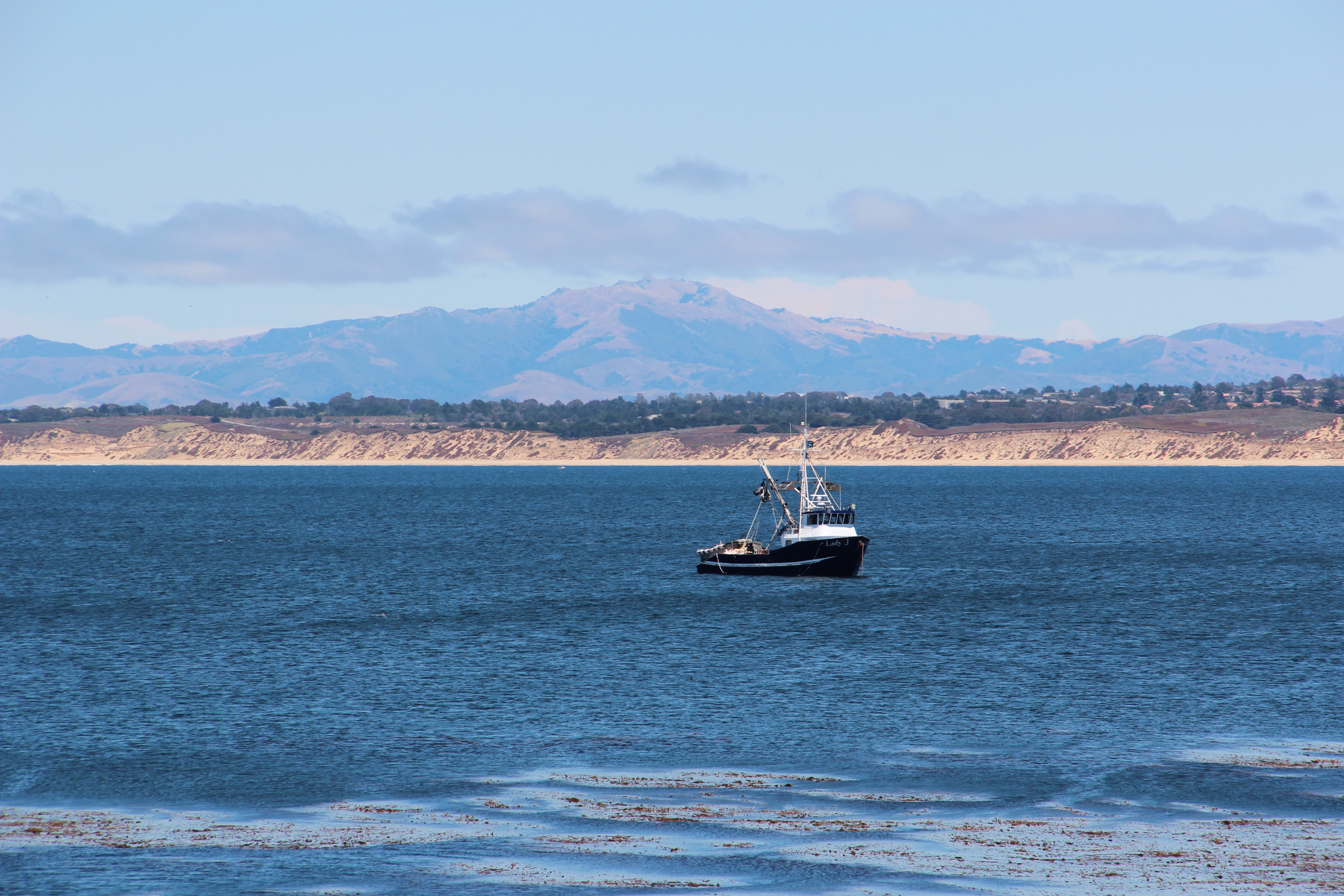
Monterey - Fremont Peak, viewed from the Monterey Bay Aquarium

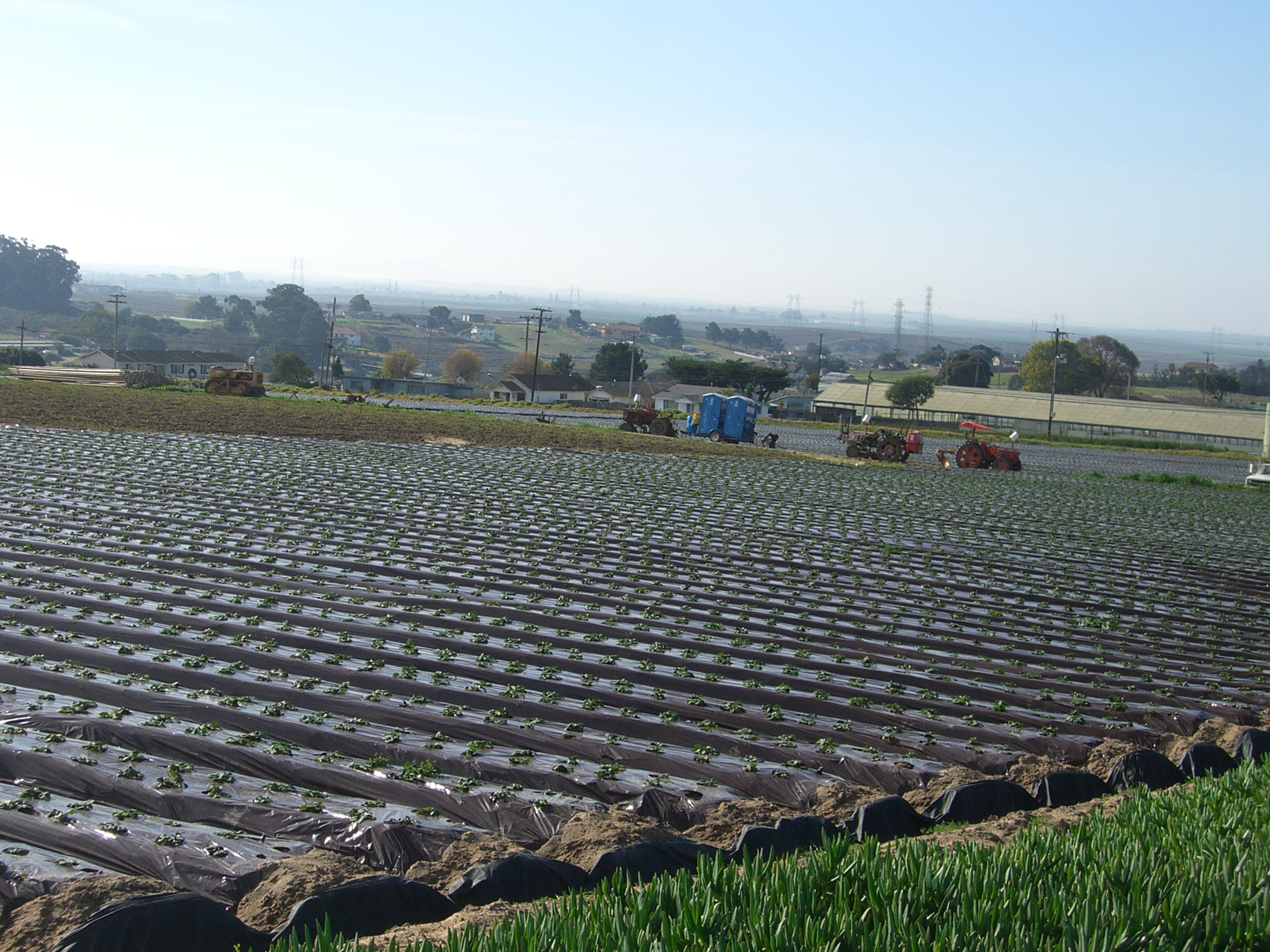
Monterey County - Strawberry fields in rural area

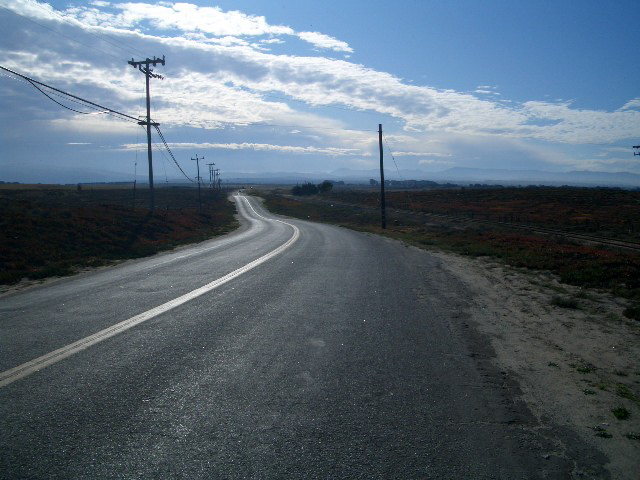
Lapis Road looking south

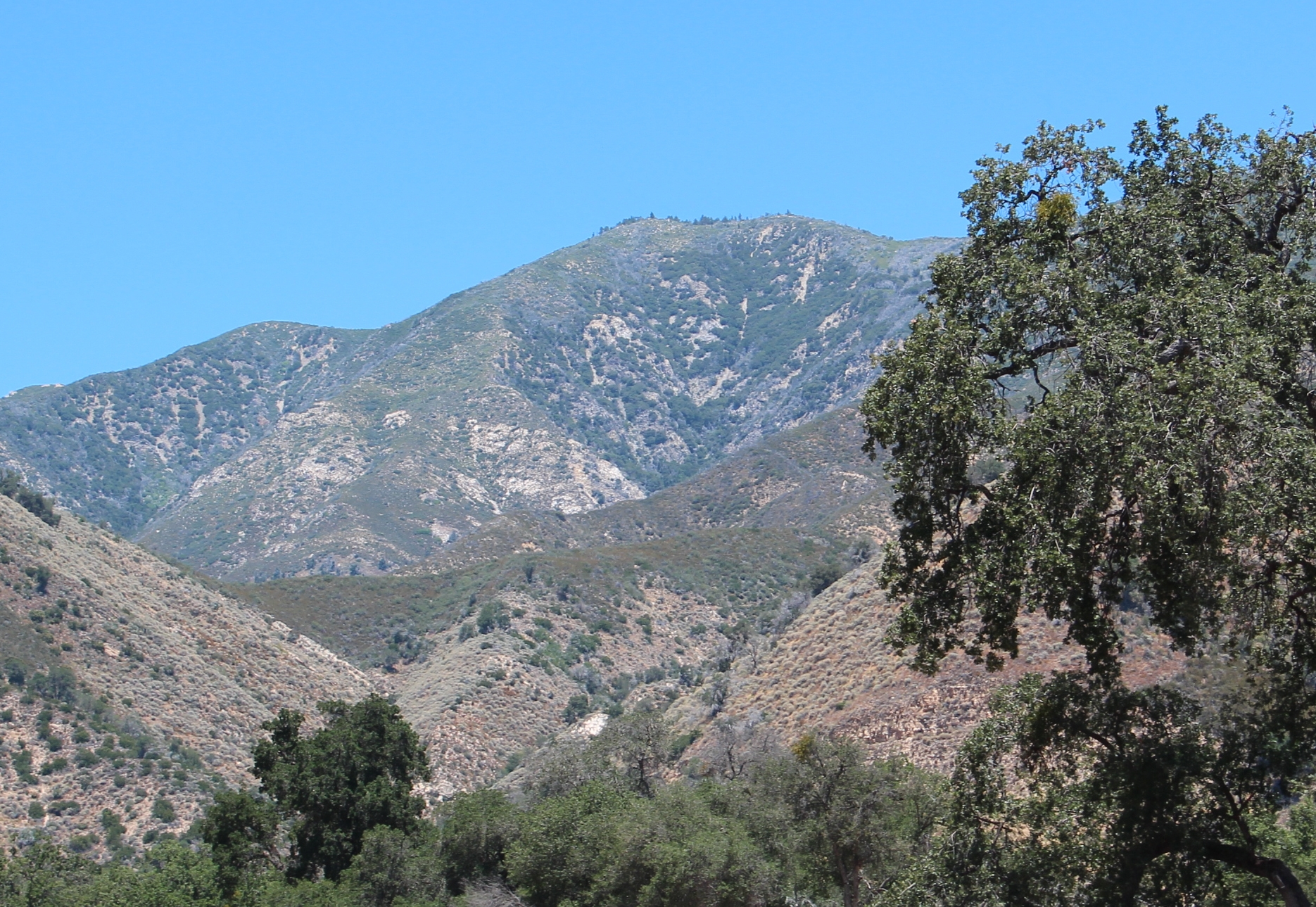
Junipero Serra Peak, highest point in the county

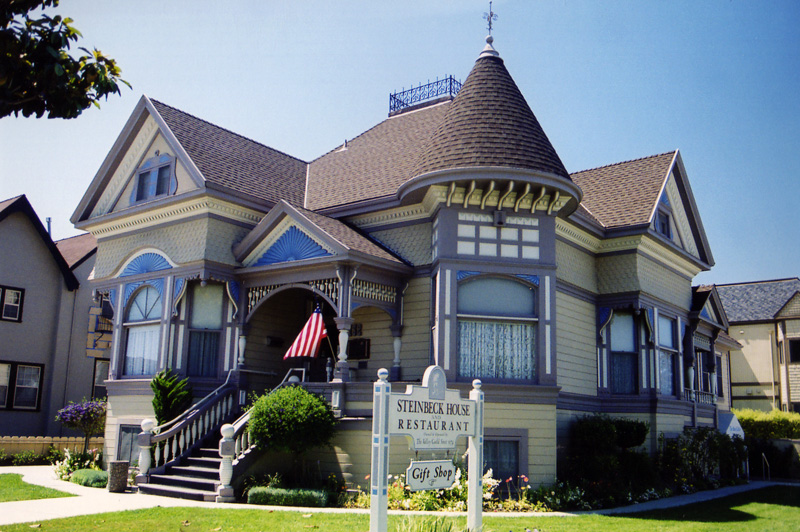
Salinas - John Steinbeck's former home

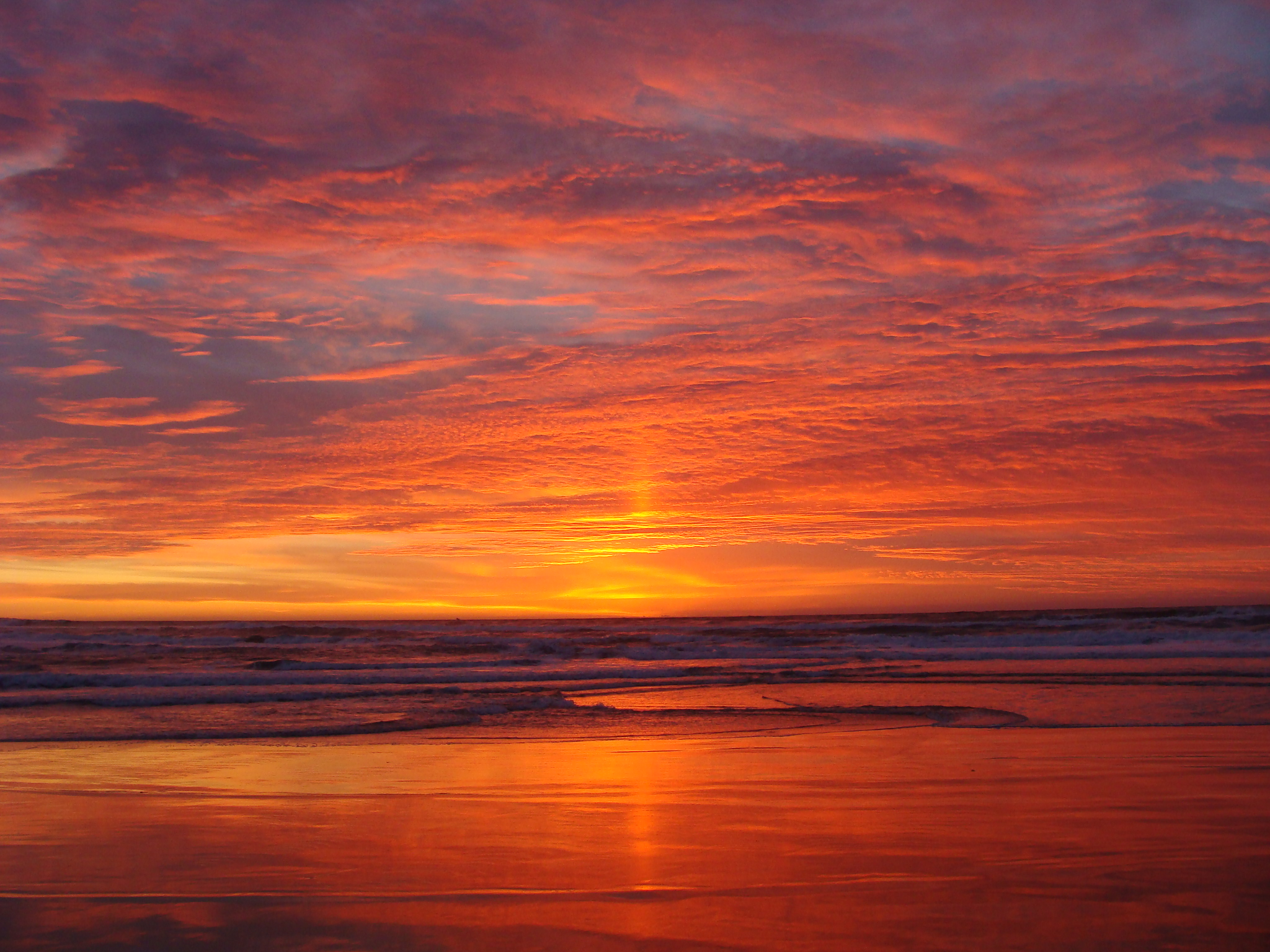
Marina Sunset

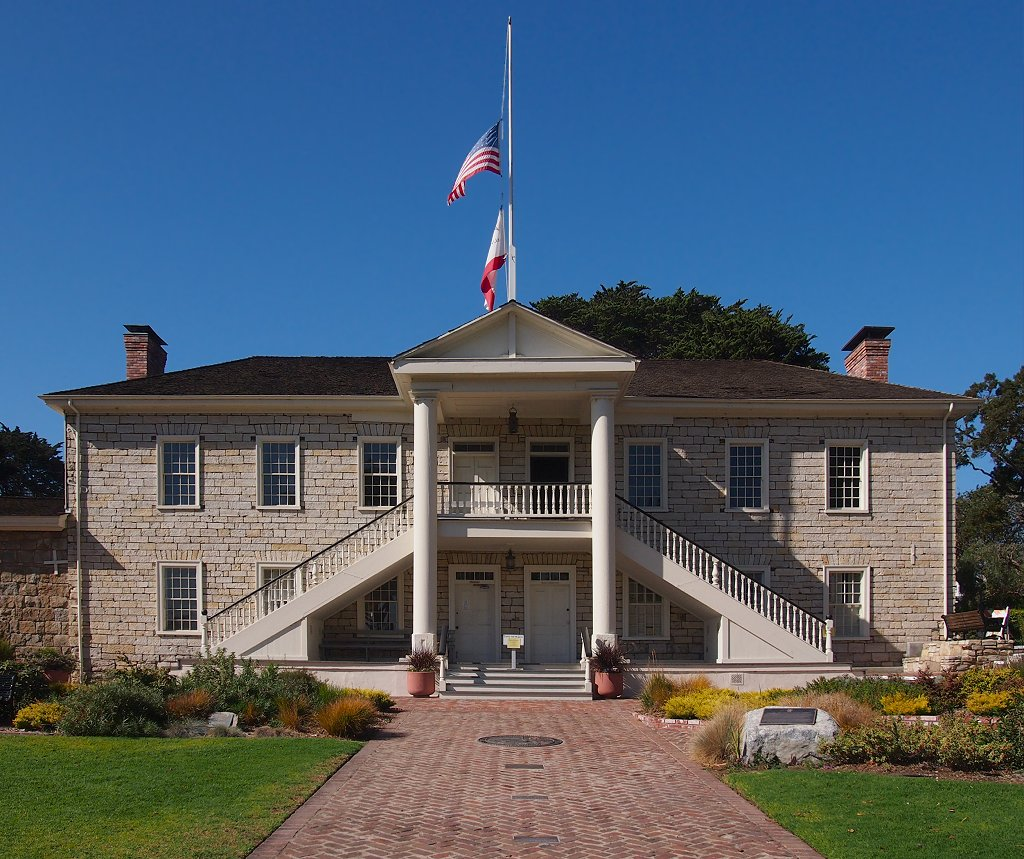
Monterey - Colton Hall

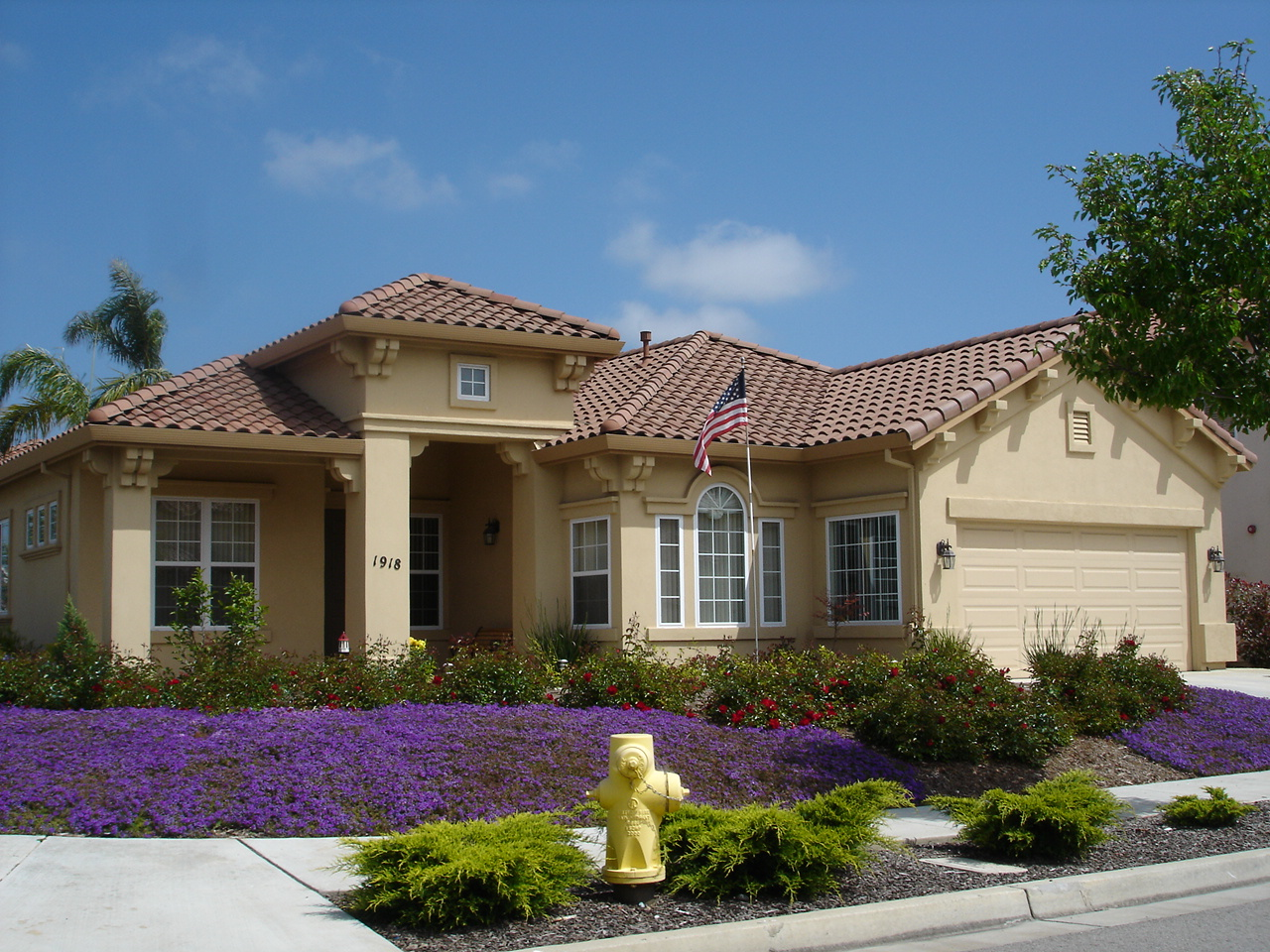
Salinas - Newer Spanish-Revival style house in Harden Ranch

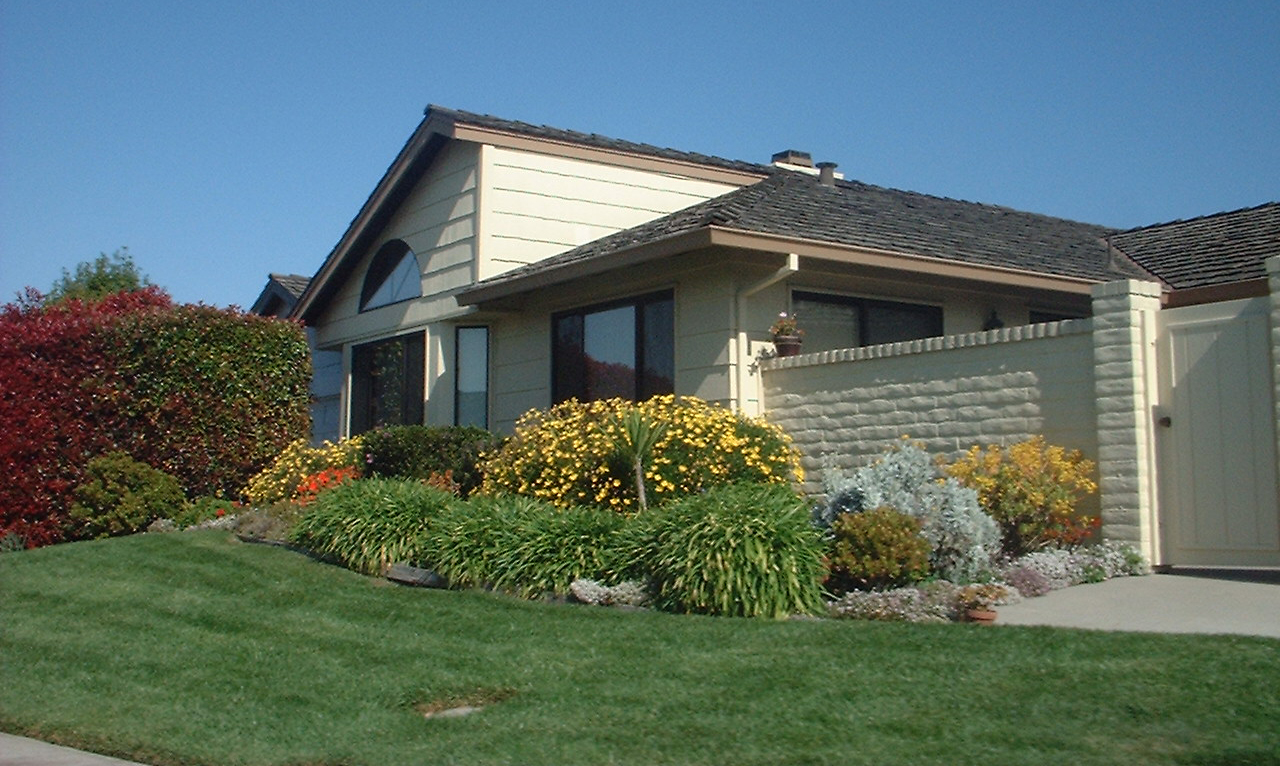
Salinas - An average 1,400 sq ft (130 m^{2}) home in North Salinas

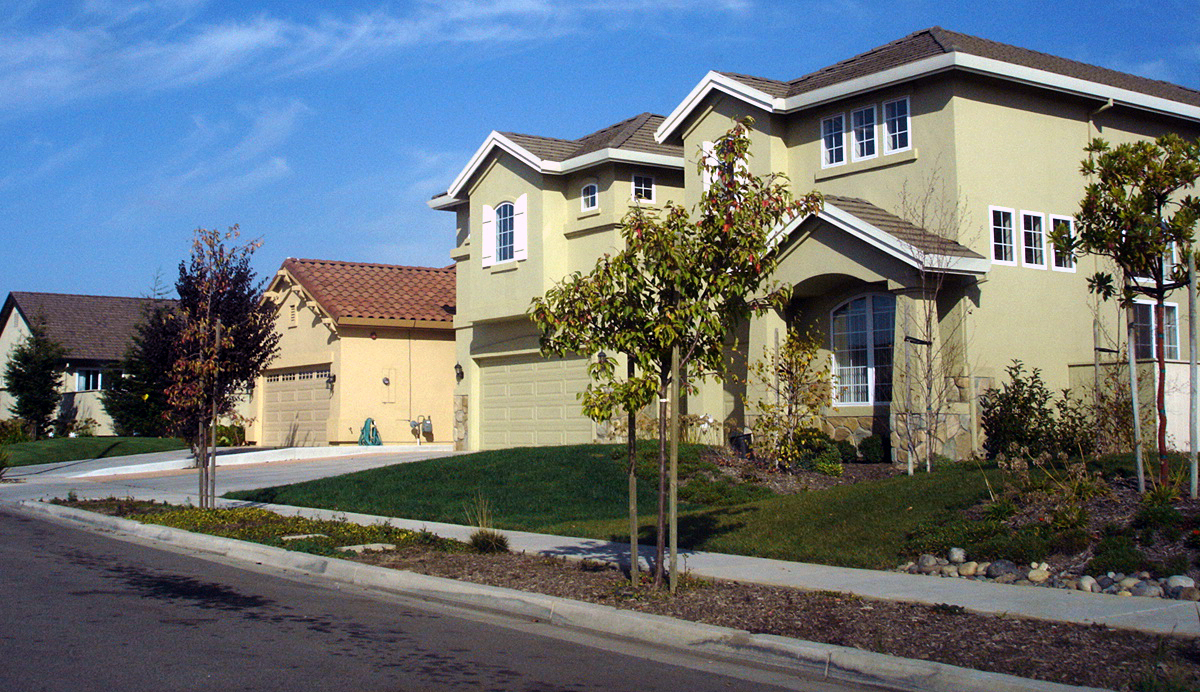
Salinas - Residential neighborhood at Harden Ranch, Salinas

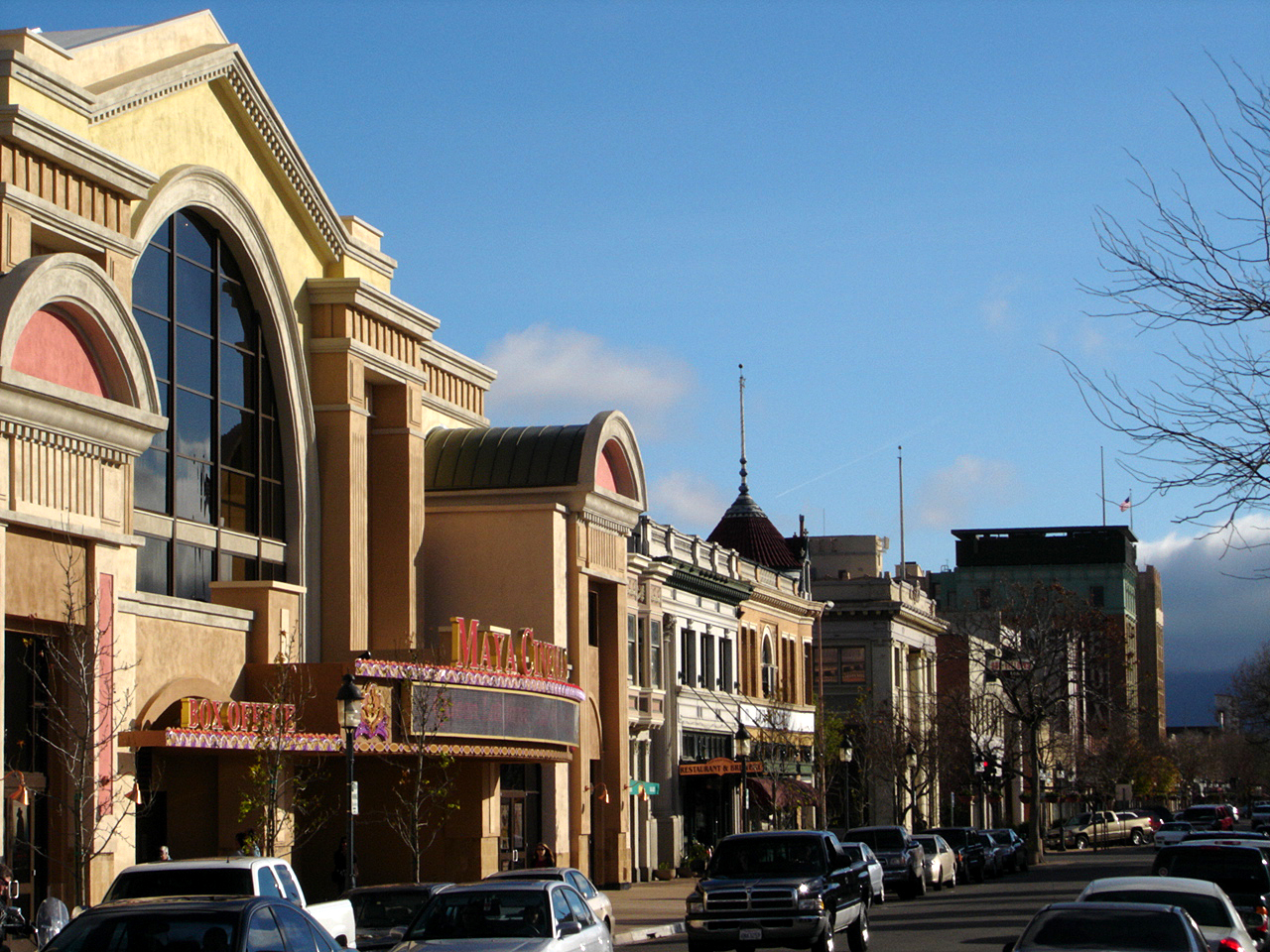
Salinas - Downtown

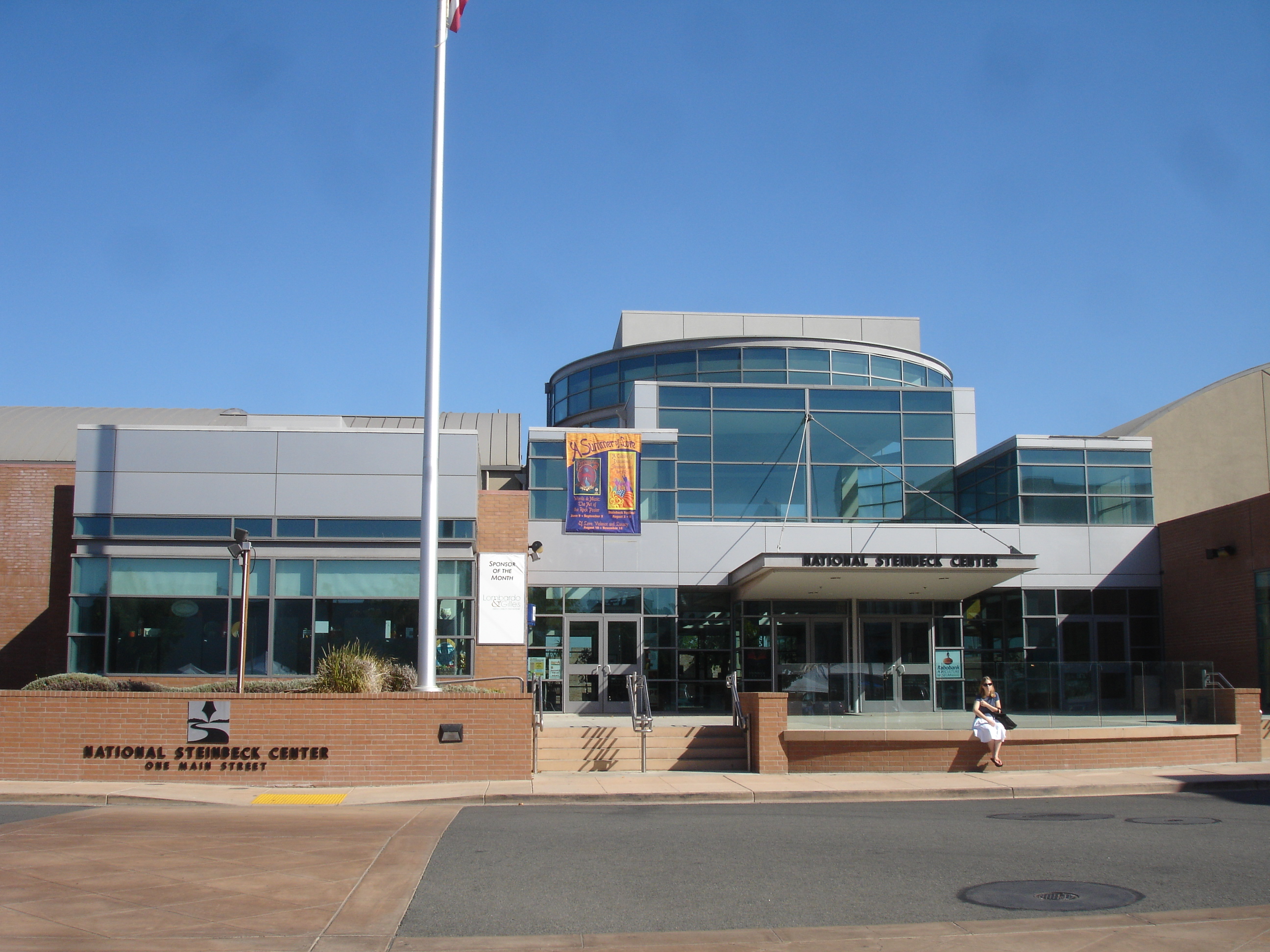
Salinas - National Steinbeck Center

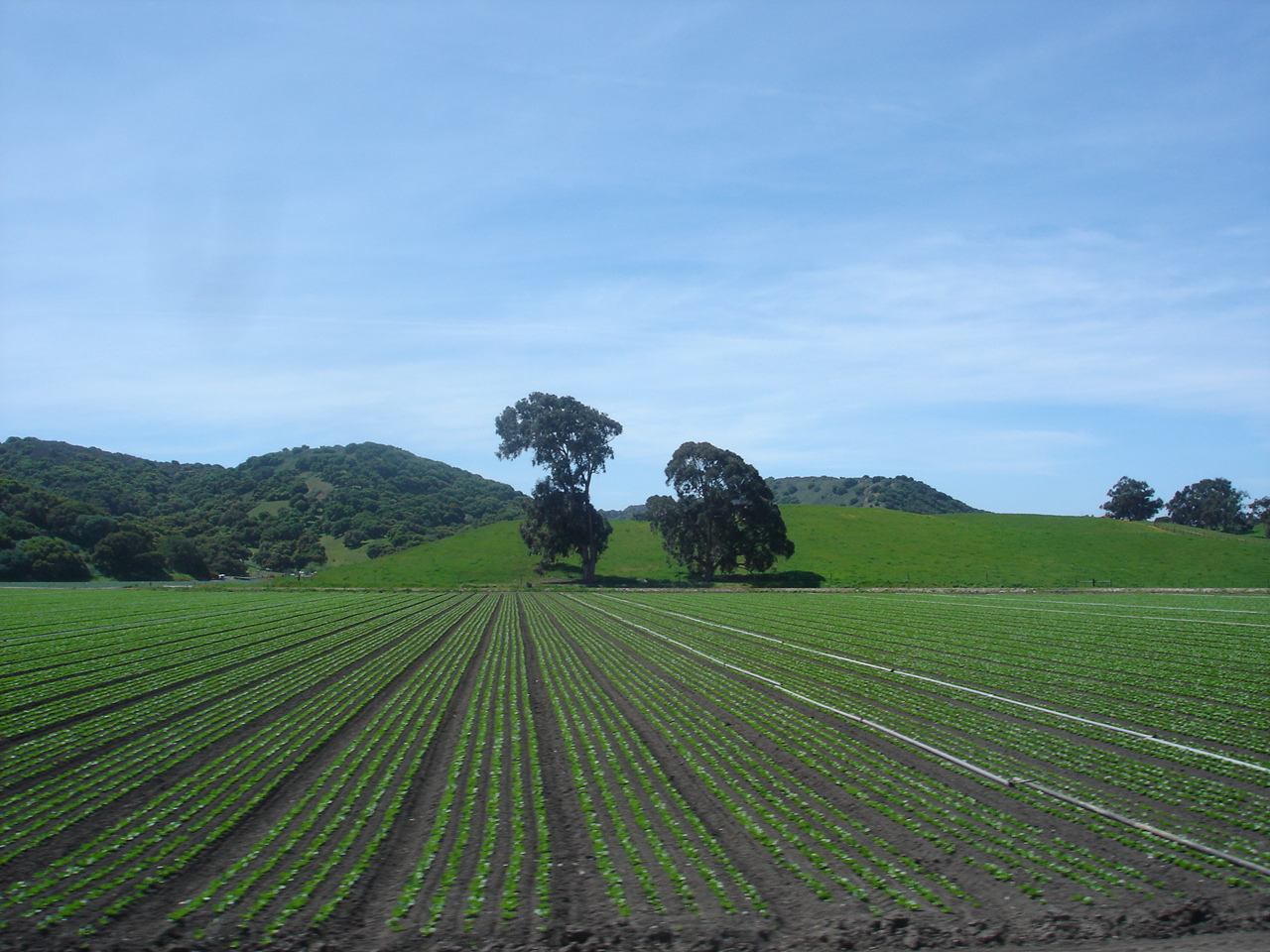
Agricultural fields in the Salinas Valley

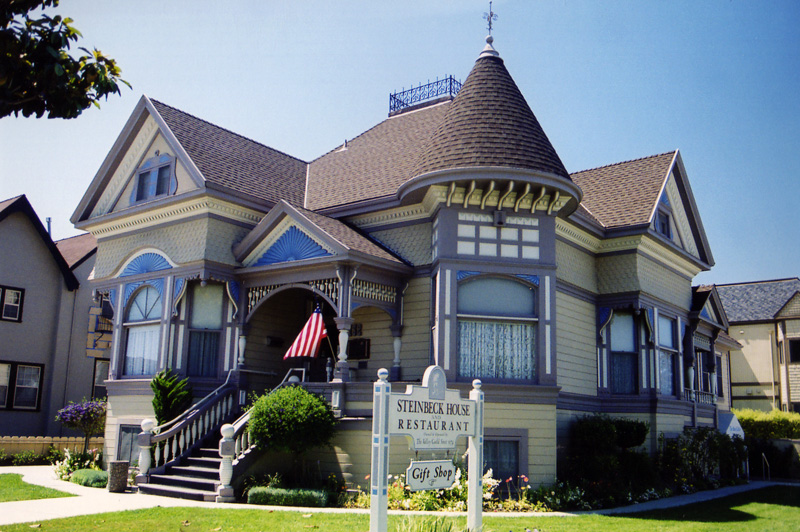
Steinbeck House - Salinas

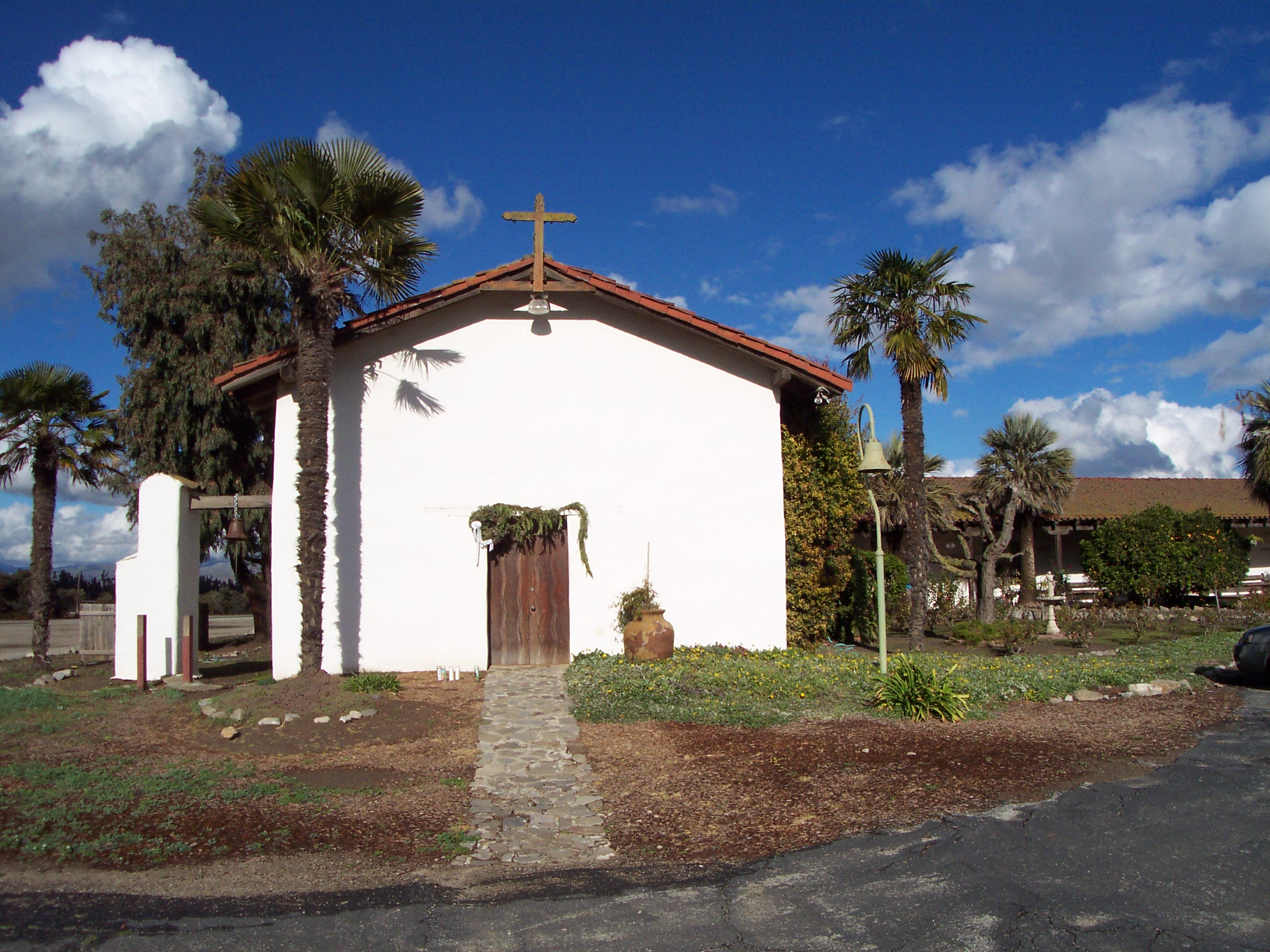
Soledad - Mission Nuestra Senora de la Soledad

== See also ==
- Coastal California
- List of museums in the California Central Coast
- List of school districts in Monterey County, California
- Monterey County reforestation
- National Register of Historic Places listings in Monterey County, California
- List of tourist attractions in Monterey County, California
- Fort Hunter Liggett
