= Salinas Union High School District =

School district in California, United States

Location
- 431 West Alisal St; Salinas, California 93901 United States

District information
- Grades: 7–12
- Superintendent: Dr. Zandra Jo Galvan
- Schools: 13
- NCES District ID: 0633980

Students and staff
- Students: 15,813 (2024–25)
- Teachers: 749.38 (FTE)

Other information
- Website: http://www.salinasuhsd.org/

Salinas Union High School District is a public school district in Monterey County, California, United States. The feeder districts are Alisal Union, Graves, Lagunita, Salinas City, Santa Rita, Spreckels and Washington Union. In the 2024–25 school year, the district had 15,813 students. Its schools, consisting of middle schools and high schools, are: Alisal High School, El Puente School, El Sausal Middle School, Everett Alvarez High School, Harden Middle School, La Paz Middle School, Mission Trails ROP, Mount Toro High School, North Salinas High School, Rancho San Juan High School, Salinas Adult School, Salinas High School, and Washington Middle School. Rancho San Juan High School opened in 2019.

The district includes Salinas, Boronda, Spreckels, a portion of Prunedale, and a small portion of Carmel Valley Village.
