= Salinas Sports Complex =

Sporting complex in California, US

Coordinates: 36.694183°N 121.651784°W

- Interactive map of Salinas Sports Complex
- Location: 1034 North Main Street, Salinas, California
- Owner: City of Salinas
- Operator: California Rodeo Salinas
- Capacity: 16,670 (SSC Arena); 5,000 (Rabobank Stadium)
- Surface: Grass, Dirt

Construction
- Groundbreaking: 1911 (grounds); 1924 (stadium)
- Opened: 1911 (grounds); 1924 (stadium) 1996 (Current Stadium)
- Cost: None

Tenants
- California Rodeo Salinas (PRCA) 1911-Present; California Jaguars (USL) 1995-1999; Cal State Monterey Bay Softball

The Salinas Sports Complex is a sporting complex located in Salinas, California on the Central Coast. The main feature of the complex is a 17,000-seat stadium for California Rodeo Salinas. Soccer, football, and rugby was also played at the main stadium before the opening of Rabobank Stadium within the complex.

== Stadium history ==
The grounds have been home to the California Rodeo Salinas since 1911. The original wood stadium structure was built in 1924 and replaced in 1996 with a stadium design by Kasavan Architects. The stadium's field is wide enough to host soccer matches along with football games, and indeed it hosted the California Jaguars of the United Soccer Leagues (then USISL) from 1995 to 1999.

For several years, the Professional Bull Riders (PBR) has hosted events from its "minor league" system, such as the Touring Pro Division (formerly the Challenger Tour) and BlueDEF Tour, at the complex.

The stadium not only hosts rodeo and sports events; it can be converted into a race track for auto racing, monster truck shows, and motorcycle racing.

Concerts have been held at the venue, such as the Eagles in 2005, RBD in 2006, the Scorpions in 2006, Mary J. Blige in 2007, Luis Miguel in 2007, Creedence Clearwater Revisited in 2009, Alan Jackson in 2012, Aerosmith in 2015, Kid Rock in 2017, & Blake Shelton in 2018.

Rabobank Stadium, a football and soccer stadium, was completed in 2013. The stadium has hosted multiple High School football programs from the Monterey Bay area over the years, including North Salinas, Palma, and San Benito High Schools. The complex is also home to baseball and softball fields.

== Salinas Assembly Center ==
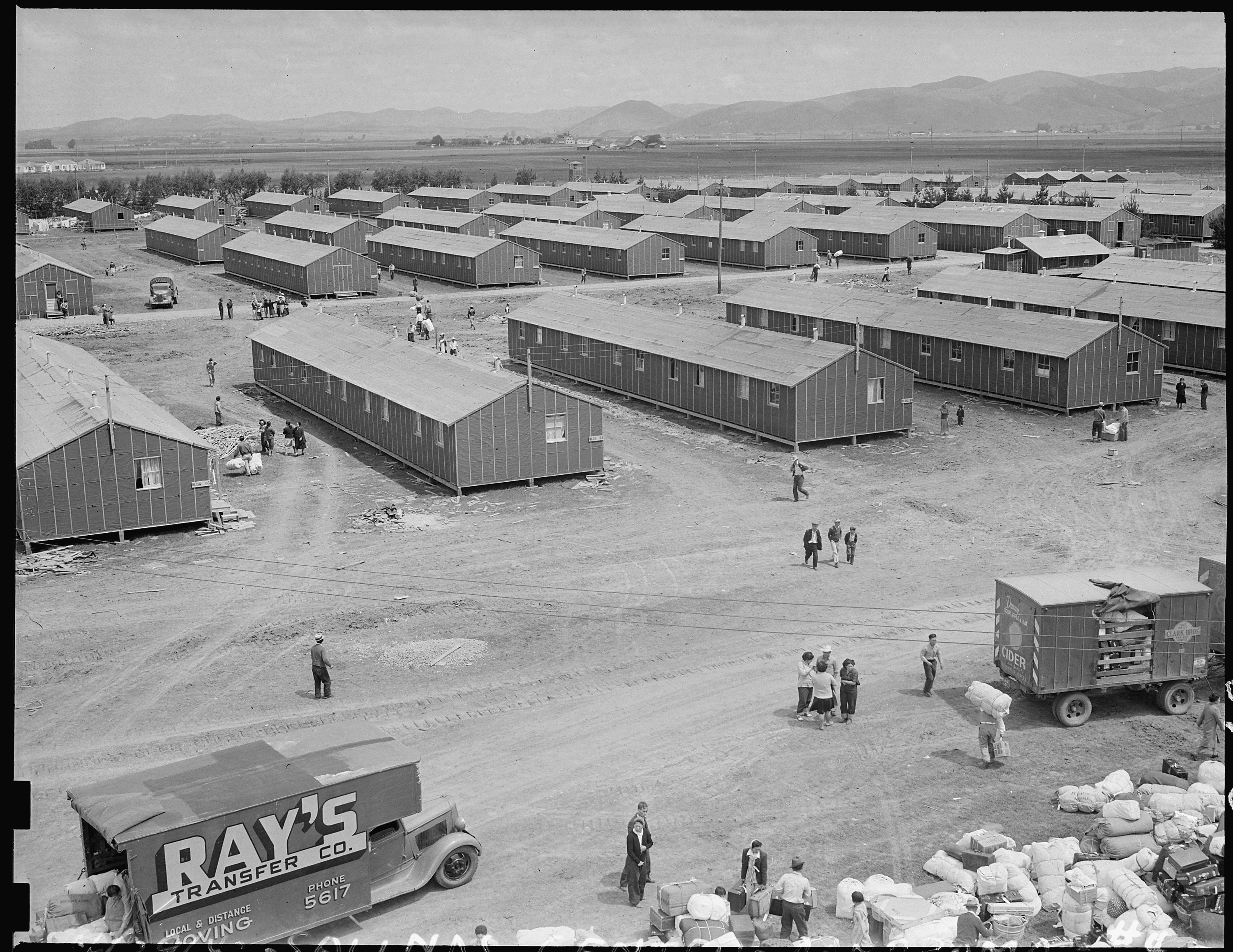
View of barracks at the Salinas Assembly Center.

During World War II, the Salinas Rodeo Grounds was one of the locations used as a temporary detention camp for citizens and immigrant residents of Japanese ancestry, before they were relocated to more permanent and remote facilities. One of seventeen such sites overseen by the Wartime Civilian Control Administration, the Salinas Assembly Center was built after President Roosevelt issued Executive Order 9066, authorizing the removal and confinement of Japanese Americans living on the West Coast. The camp opened on April 27, 1942, and held a total of 3,608 people before closing two months later on July 4, 1942. Most came from the Monterey Bay area and were transferred to the Poston concentration camp, located on the Colorado River Indian Reservation in Arizona.

In 1980, the Salinas Assembly Center, along with eleven other former temporary detention sites, was designated California Historical Landmark #934. A historical marker and memorial garden were dedicated on the 1984 Day of Remembrance. This location cannot be considered a National Historic Landmark due to its post-war use and land development.

From July 1942 until 1945 the center was used by the US Army VII Corps as the Salinas Garrison.

== See also ==
- Bibliography of the Japanese American Internment during World War II
- Outline of Japanese American Internment during World War II
- California Historical Landmarks in Monterey County
- California Historical Landmarks
