= North Salinas High School =

Location
- 55 Kip Dr. Salinas, California; United States; 36.70625°N 121.64548°W

Information
- Type: Public secondary
- Founded: 1959
- School district: Salinas Union High School District
- CEEB code: 52746
- Principal: Mary White
- Teaching staff: 94.78 (FTE)
- Grades: 9-12
- Enrollment: 2,125 (2023-2024)
- Student to teacher ratio: 22.42
- Campus type: Rural / Suburban
- Colors: Scarlet and Columbia blue
- Mascot: Viking
- Website: nshs.salinasuhsd.org

North Salinas High School is a public high school established in Salinas, California. It is one of five primary high schools of the Salinas Union High School District. The school was founded in 1959 as the second high school in the system to relieve overcrowding at the original high school in Salinas, Salinas High School.

Students at North Salinas usually come from Harden Middle School, Washington Middle School, and Gavilan View Middle School.

== Notable alumni ==
- Dustin Lance Black, screenwriter, 2008 Academy Award for Milk
- Alvin Harrison, twin of Calvin, 1996 gold medal in Olympic 4x400 relay; 2000 silver medal in 400 metres, 2000 gold medal in 4x400 relay, later disqualified due to drug violation by a teammate; afterward competed for the Dominican Republic
- Calvin Harrison, twin of Alvin, national high school record 400m, 2000 gold medal in Olympic 4x400 relay, later disqualified due to drug violation by a teammate
- Del Rodgers, of San Francisco 49ers; Super Bowl champions
- Carl Nicks, New Orleans Saints Pro Bowl guard and Super Bowl XLIV champion
- Ramiro Corrales, Major League Soccer player
- Monica Abbott, pro softball player, participated in 2008 Beijing Olympics and 2020 Tokyo Summer Olympics earning a silver medal in both.
- Bryiana Noelle, Playboy Playmate, Miss September 2013
- Kassim Osgood, San Diego Chargers wide receiver
- Anthony Toney, of Philadelphia Eagles
