= Calvin Harrison (disambiguation) =

Calvin Harrison may refer to:

- Calvin Harrison (athlete)
- Calvin Harrison (cricketer)

== See also ==
- Calvin Harris, Scottish DJ
