= Salinas, California =

City in California, United States

- City
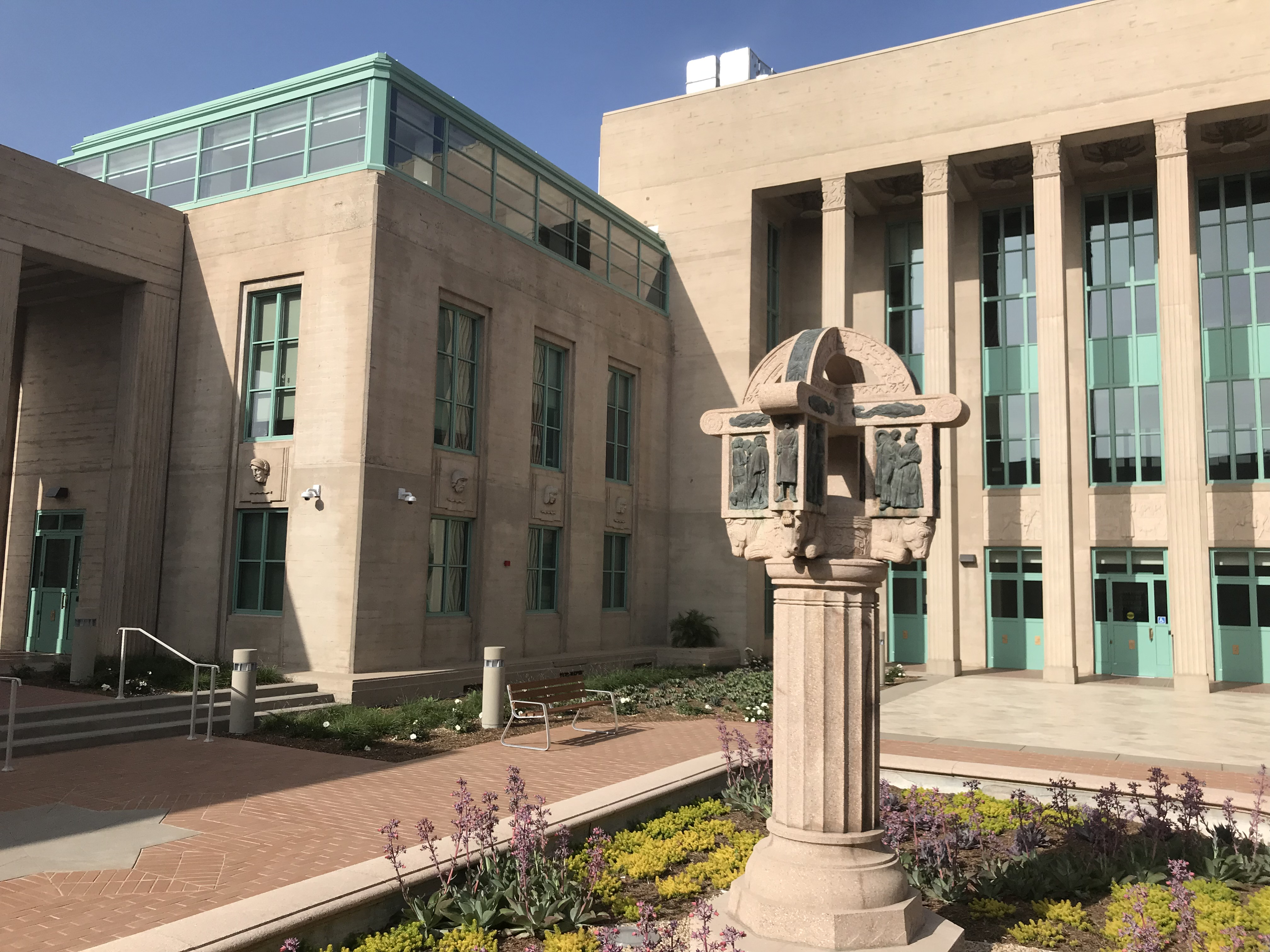
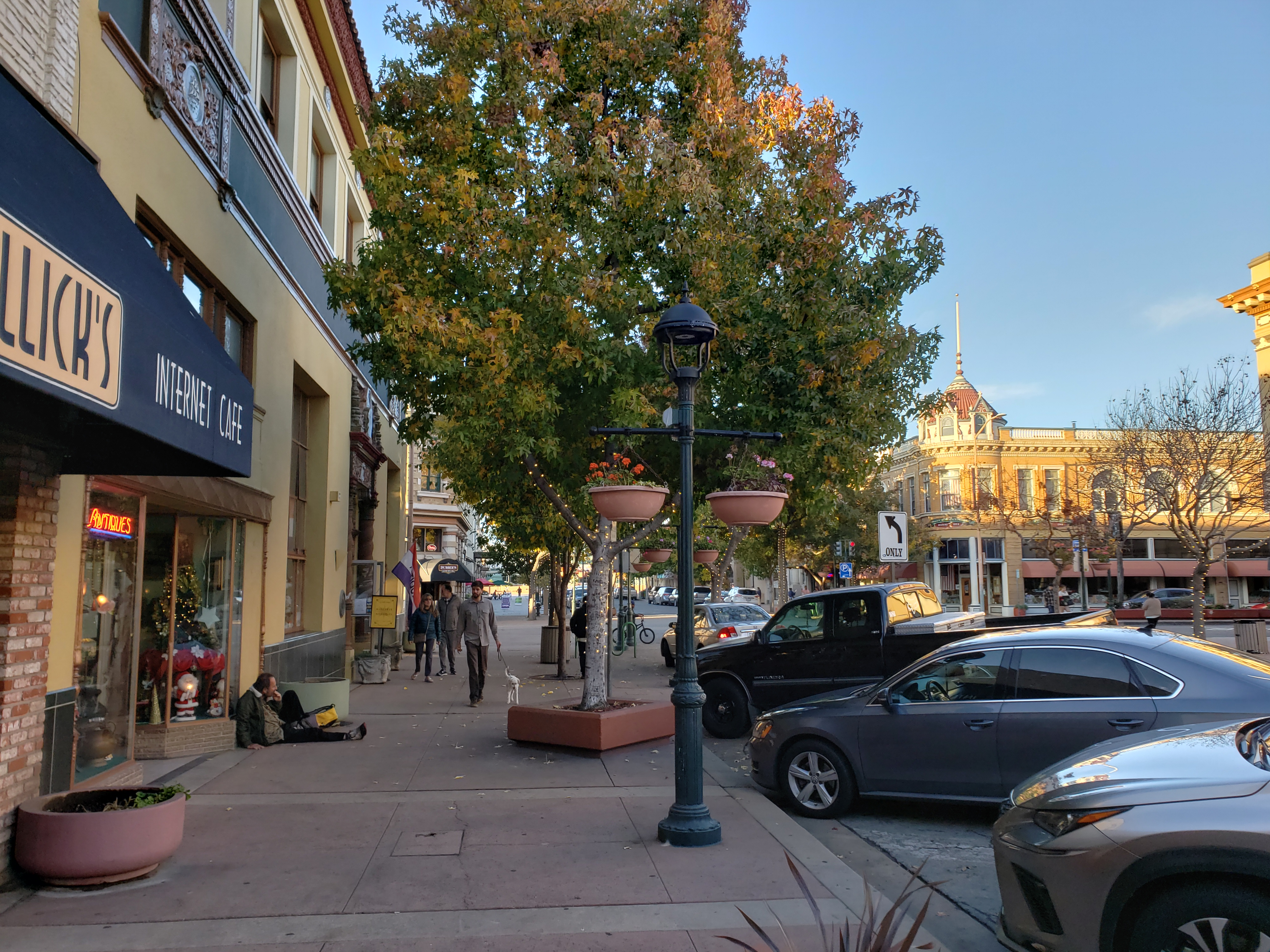
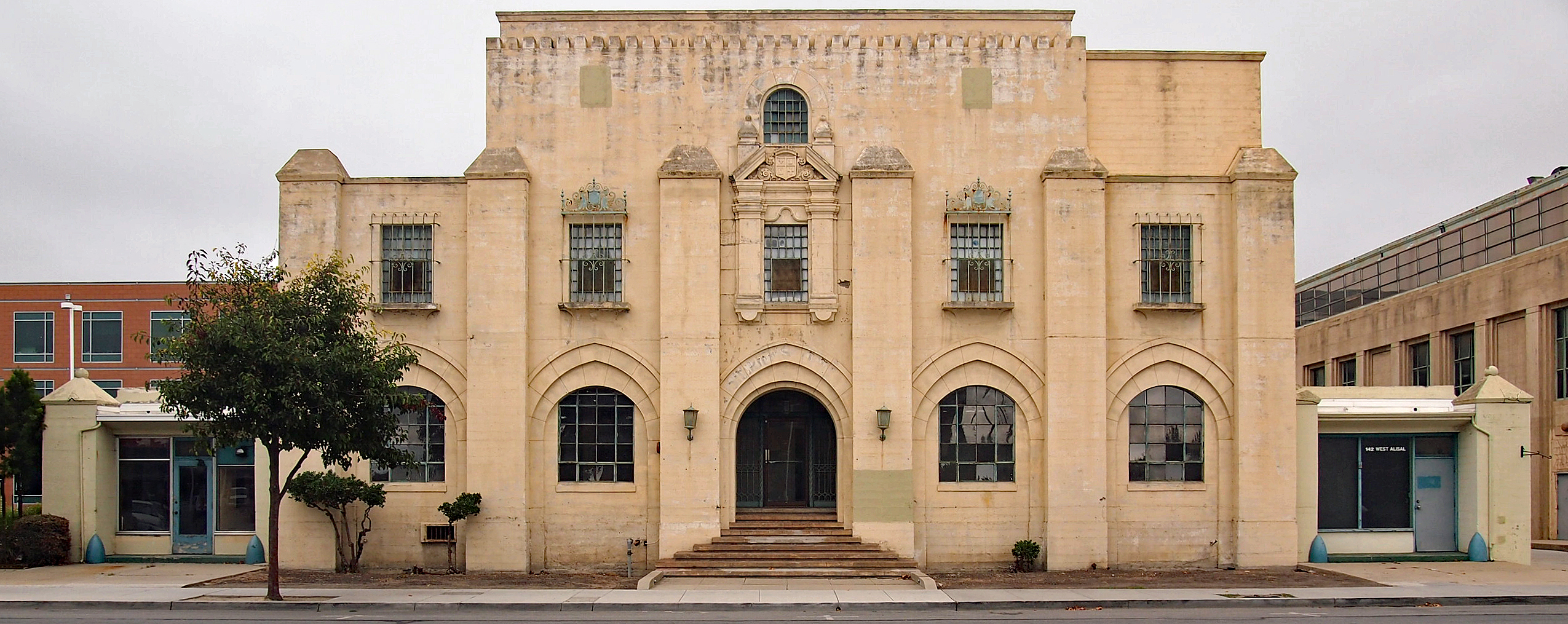
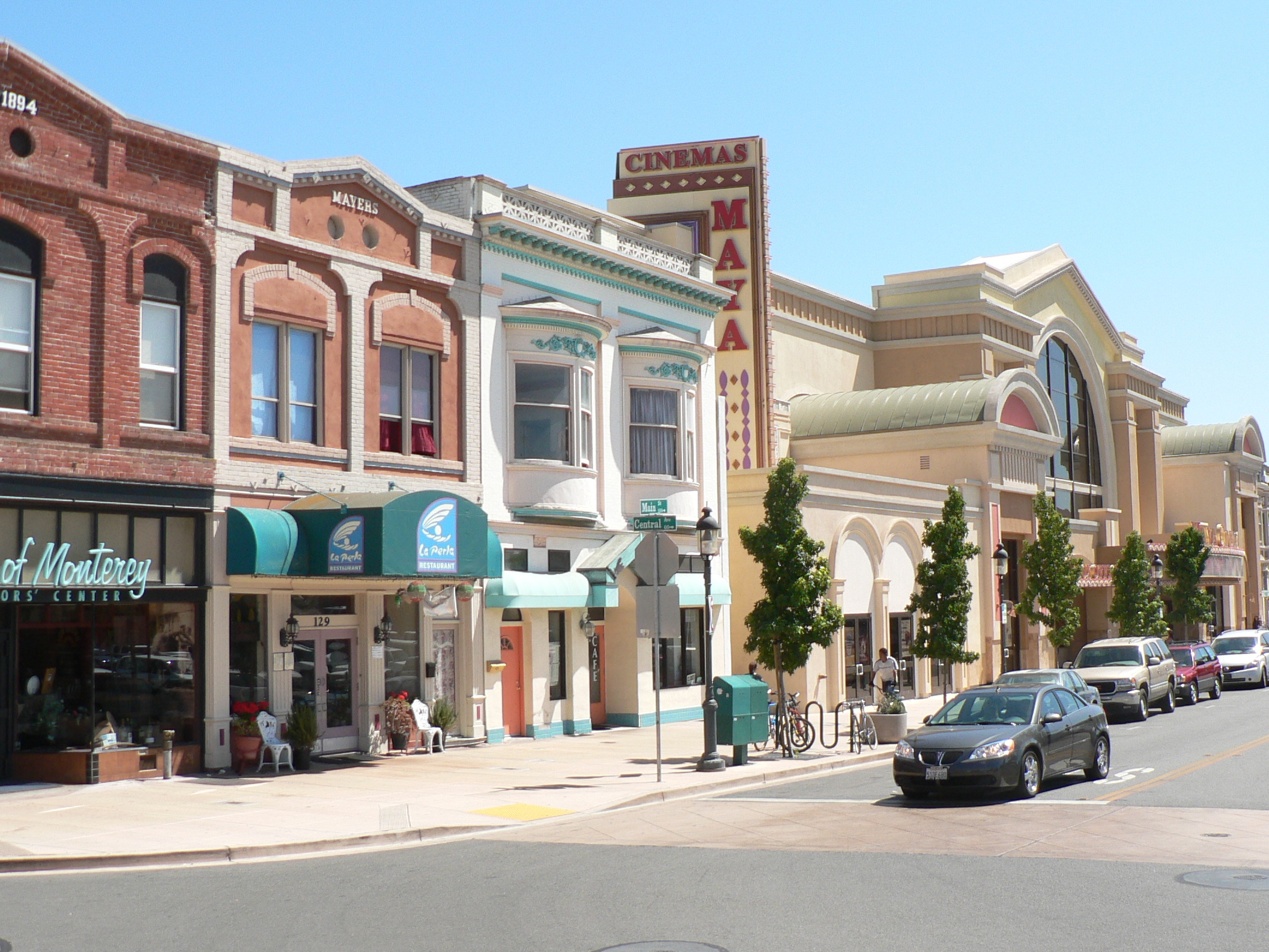
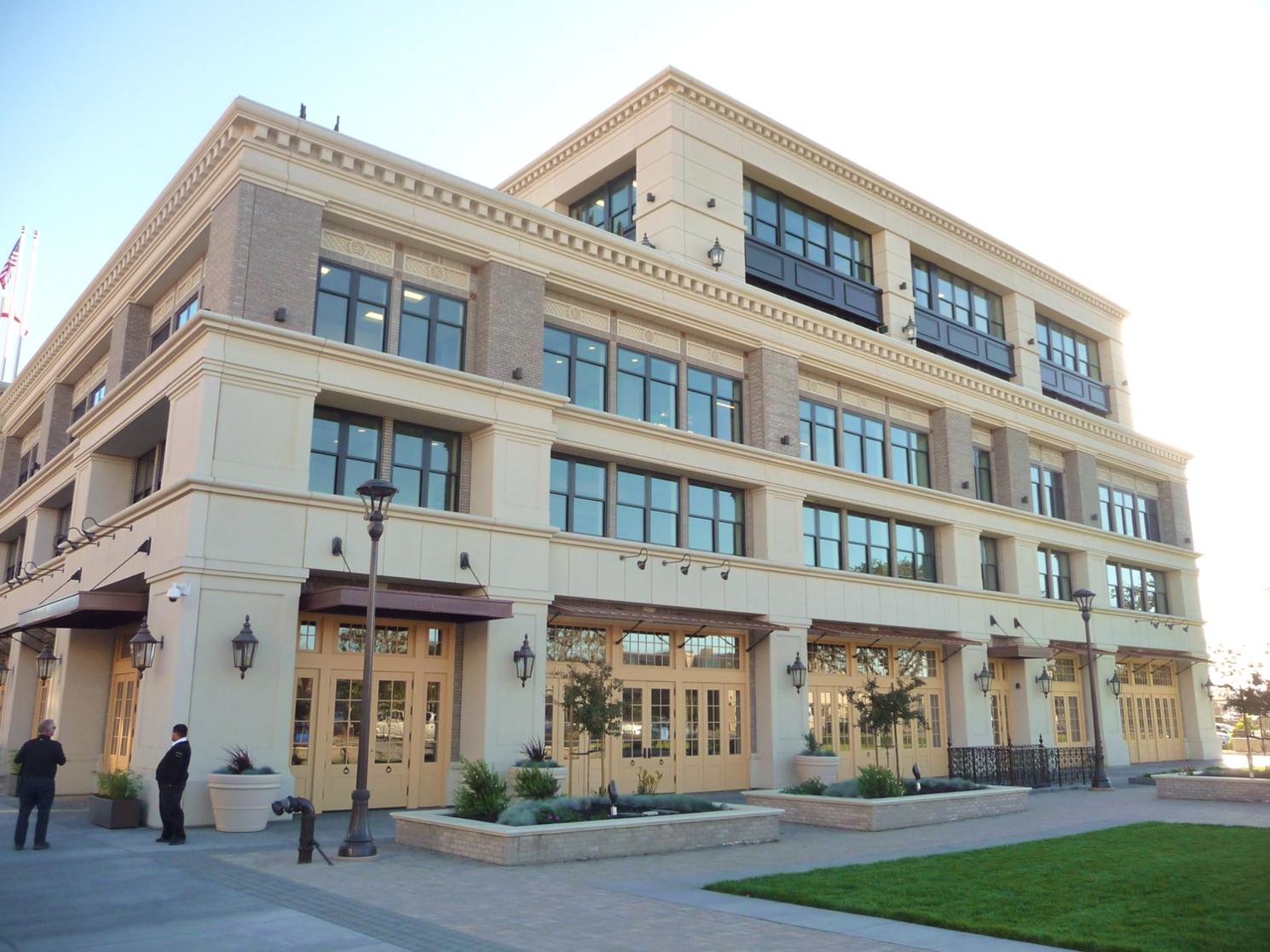
- Top: Monterey County Court House; downtown; middle: historic Monterey County Jail building; bottom: Taylor Farms headquarters; downtown.

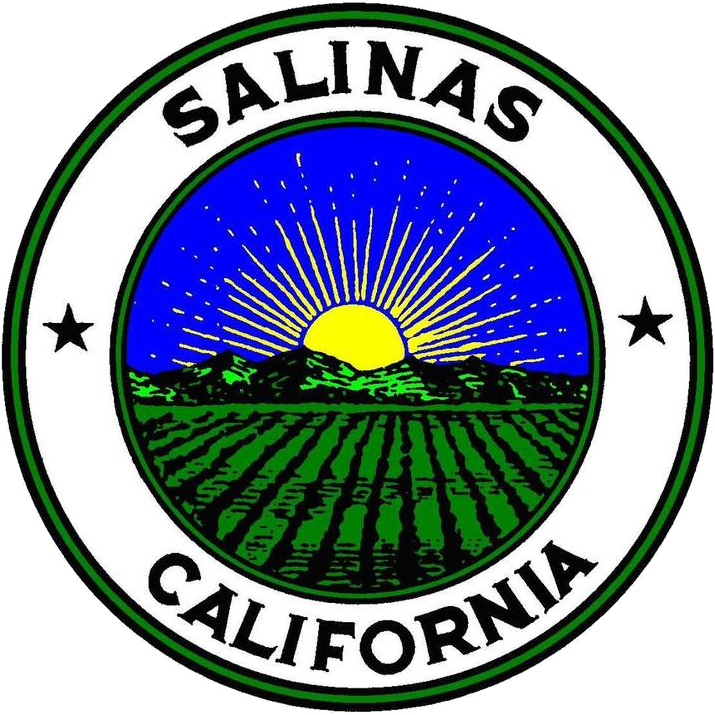
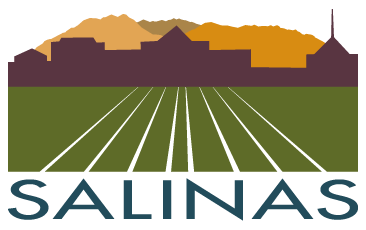
- Seal Wordmark
- Nickname: "The Salad Bowl of the World"
- Motto: "Rich in Land, Rich in Values."
- Interactive map of Salinas, California
- Location in California Location in the United States
- Coordinates: 36°40′40″N 121°39′20″W
- Country: United States
- State: California
- Region: Central Coast
- County: Monterey
- Incorporated: March 4, 1874

Government
  - Type: Council–manager
  - Mayor: Dennis Donohue
  - State senator: John Laird (D)
  - Assemblymember: Robert Rivas (D)
  - U. S. rep.: Zoe Lofgren (D)

Area
  - City: 23.55 sq mi (60.99 km^{2})
  - Land: 23.51 sq mi (60.90 km^{2})
  - Water: 0.031 sq mi (0.08 km^{2}) 0.14%
- Elevation: 52 ft (16 m)

Population (2020)
  - City: 163,542
  - Rank: 1st in Monterey County; 35th in California; 163rd in the United States
  - Density: 6,955/sq mi (2,685/km^{2})
- Time zone: UTC-8 (Pacific)
  - Summer (DST): UTC-7 (PDT)
- ZIP Codes: 93901–93903, 93905–93908, 93912, and 93915
- Area code: 831
- FIPS code: 06-64224
- GNIS feature IDs: 277589, 2411768
- Website: www.salinas.gov

Salinas (/səˈliːnəs/; Spanish for "Salt Flats") is a city in and the county seat of Monterey County, California, United States. With a population of 163,542 in the 2020 Census, Salinas is the most populous city in Monterey County. Salinas is an urban area located along the eastern limits of the Monterey Bay Area, lying just south of the San Francisco Bay Area and 10 miles (16 km) southeast of the mouth of the Salinas River. The city is located at the mouth of the Salinas Valley, about eight miles (13 km) from the Pacific Ocean, and it has a climate more influenced by the ocean than the interior.

Salinas serves as the main business, governmental, and industrial center of the region. The marine climate is ideal for the floral industry, grape vineyards, and vegetable growers. Salinas is known as the "Salad Bowl of the World" for its large, vibrant agriculture industry.

It was the hometown of writer and Nobel laureate John Steinbeck (1902–1968), who set many of his stories in the Salinas Valley and Monterey. Salinas has a high Hispanic proportion, which at 79.6%, is the highest proportion of Hispanic Americans out of any city in California, and 8th largest overall in the nation. The city also has a sizable Asian-American population, with a large and historic Filipino population. The city once also had the second-largest Chinatown in the nation behind only San Francisco.

== History ==
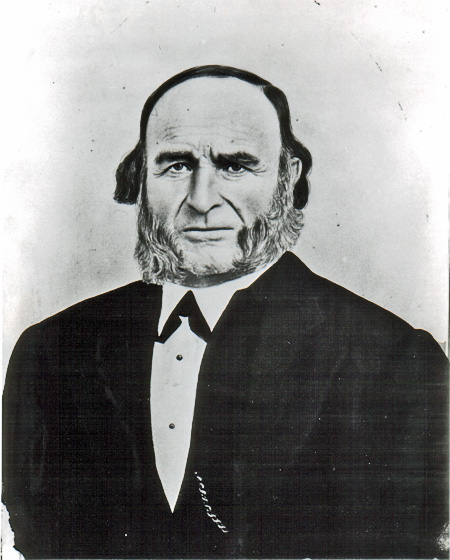
José Eusebio Boronda, a Californio ranchero, was granted Rancho Rincón del Sanjón in 1840, covering today's northwestern Salinas and Boronda.

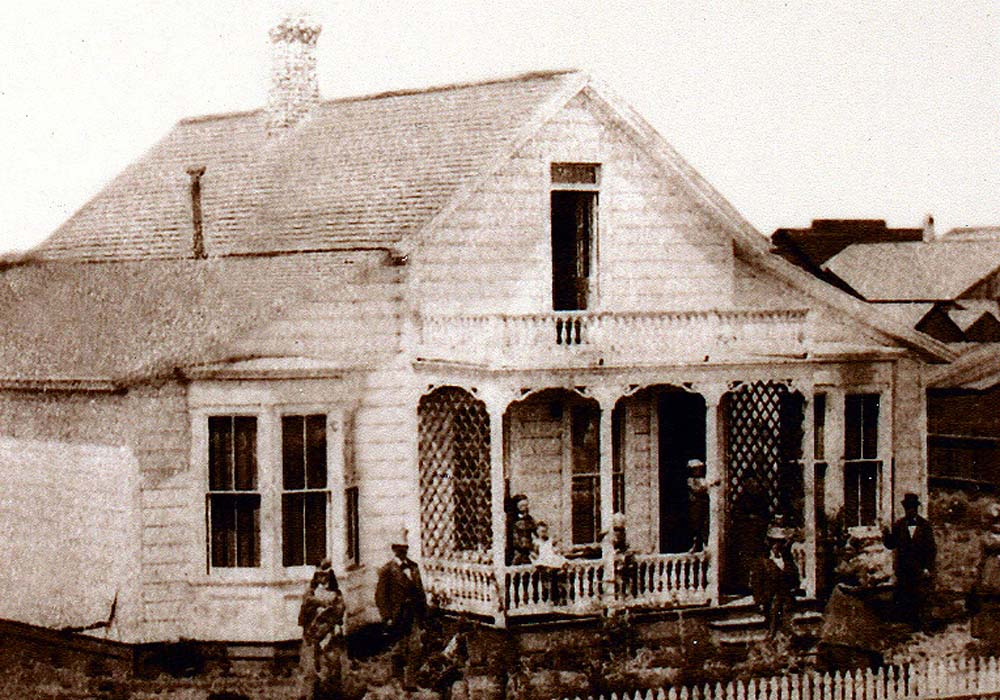
First Mayor's House circa 1868

The land on which Salinas is situated is thought to have been settled by Native Americans known as the Esselen prior to 200 AD. Between 200 and 500 AD, they were displaced by the Rumsen group of Ohlone speaking people. The Rumsen-Ohlone remained as the inhabitants of the area for approximately another 1,200 years, and in the 1700s, were the group of native inhabitants contacted and recorded by the first Spanish explorers of the Salinas area.

Upon the arrival of the Spanish, large Spanish land grants were initially issued for the Catholic Missions and also as bonuses to soldiers. Later on after Mexican independence, smaller land grants continued to be issued for ranchos where mostly cattle were grazed. One of the many land grants was the Rancho Las Salinas land grant, part of which included the area of modern-day Salinas. As a result of the many new cattle ranches, a thriving trade eventually developed in cattle hide shipments, shipping primarily out of the Port of Monterey.

Before the transition to American administration, Monterey had been the capital of California. For a short while after the transition, California was ruled by martial law. On September 9, 1850, California was admitted to the Union and became a State, celebrated as California Admission Day.

In the 1850s a junction of two main stage coach routes was located 18 miles (29 km) east of Monterey and along the big bend of what is locally called the Alisal Slough. In 1854, six years after becoming a part of the United States, a group of American settlers living in the vicinity of this route-junction opened a post office at the junction, naming their town "Salinas," apparently a reference to the original "Rancho Las Salinas" name for the area, which in turn was named in Spanish for the salt marshes of the area around the central Salinas slough, which was drained. Soon thereafter, in 1856, a traveler's inn called the Halfway House was opened at that junction in Salinas. (The nearby Salinas River, was apparently only later named by an American cartographer, after the nearest town of Salinas in 1858. That river had previously been known as "Rio de Monterey."). The streets of Salinas were laid out in 1867, and the town was incorporated in 1874.

The conversion of grazing land to crops and the coming of the railroad in 1868 to transport goods and people was a major turning point in the history and economic advancement of Salinas. Dry farming of wheat, barley, and other grains as well as potatoes and mustard seed was common in the 1800s. Chinese labor drained thousands of acres of swampland to become productive farmland, and as much early farm labor was done by Chinese immigrants, Salinas boasted the second largest Chinatown in the state, slightly smaller than San Francisco. Irrigation changed farming in Salinas to mainly row crops of root vegetables, grapes and sugar beets. Many major vegetable producers placed their headquarters in Salinas. Driven by the profitable agricultural industry, Salinas had the highest per capita income of any city in the United States in 1924.

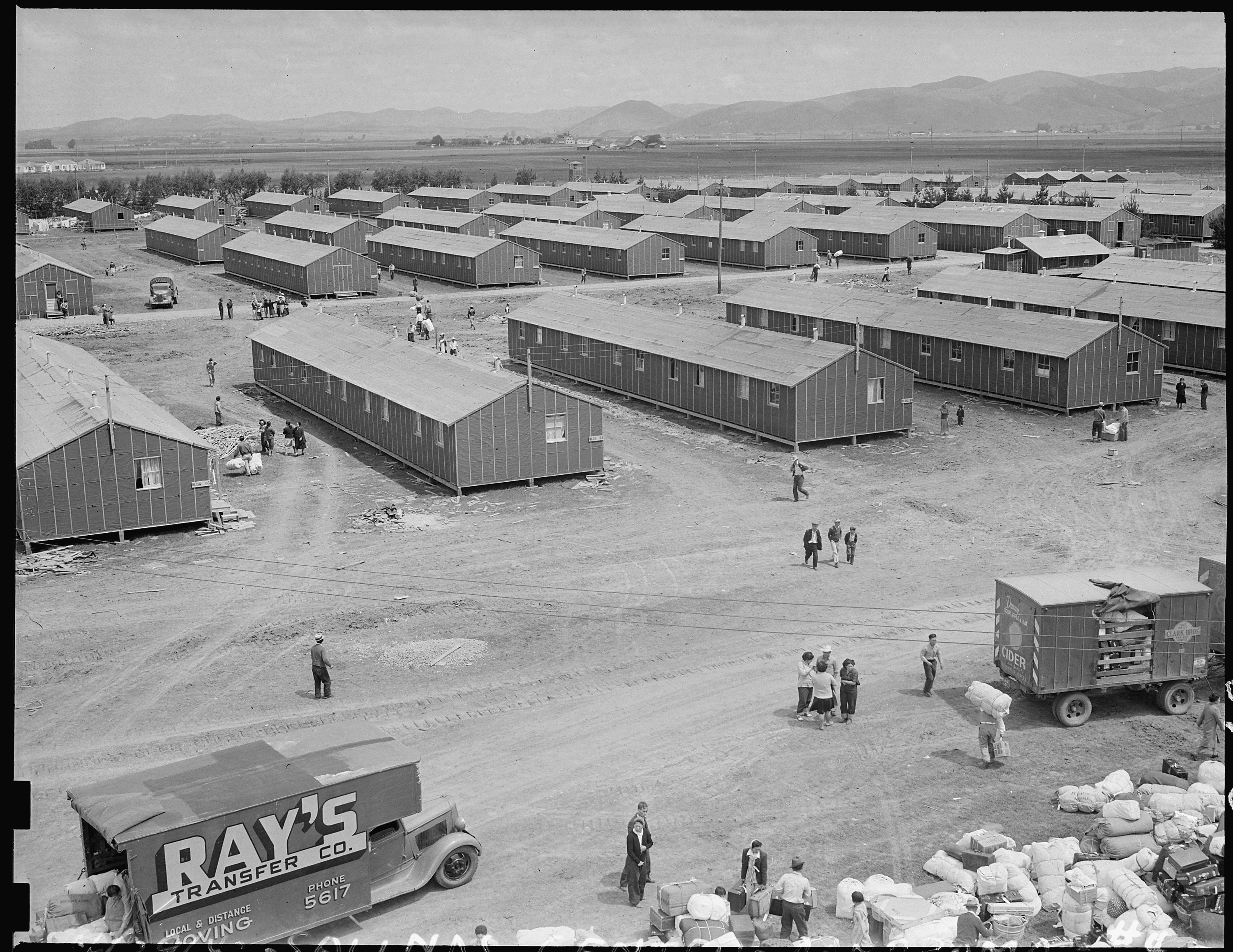
Barracks at Salinas Assembly Center

During World War II, the Salinas Rodeo Grounds was one of the locations used as a temporary detention camp for citizens and immigrant residents of Japanese ancestry, before they were relocated to more permanent and remote facilities. One of seventeen such sites overseen by the Wartime Civilian Control Administration, the Salinas Assembly Center was built after President Roosevelt issued Executive Order 9066, authorizing the removal and confinement of Japanese Americans living on the West Coast. The camp opened on April 27, 1942, and held a total of 3,608 people before closing two months later on July 4. Of the 300 Japanese-American families in Salinas before the war, only 25 returned following internment.

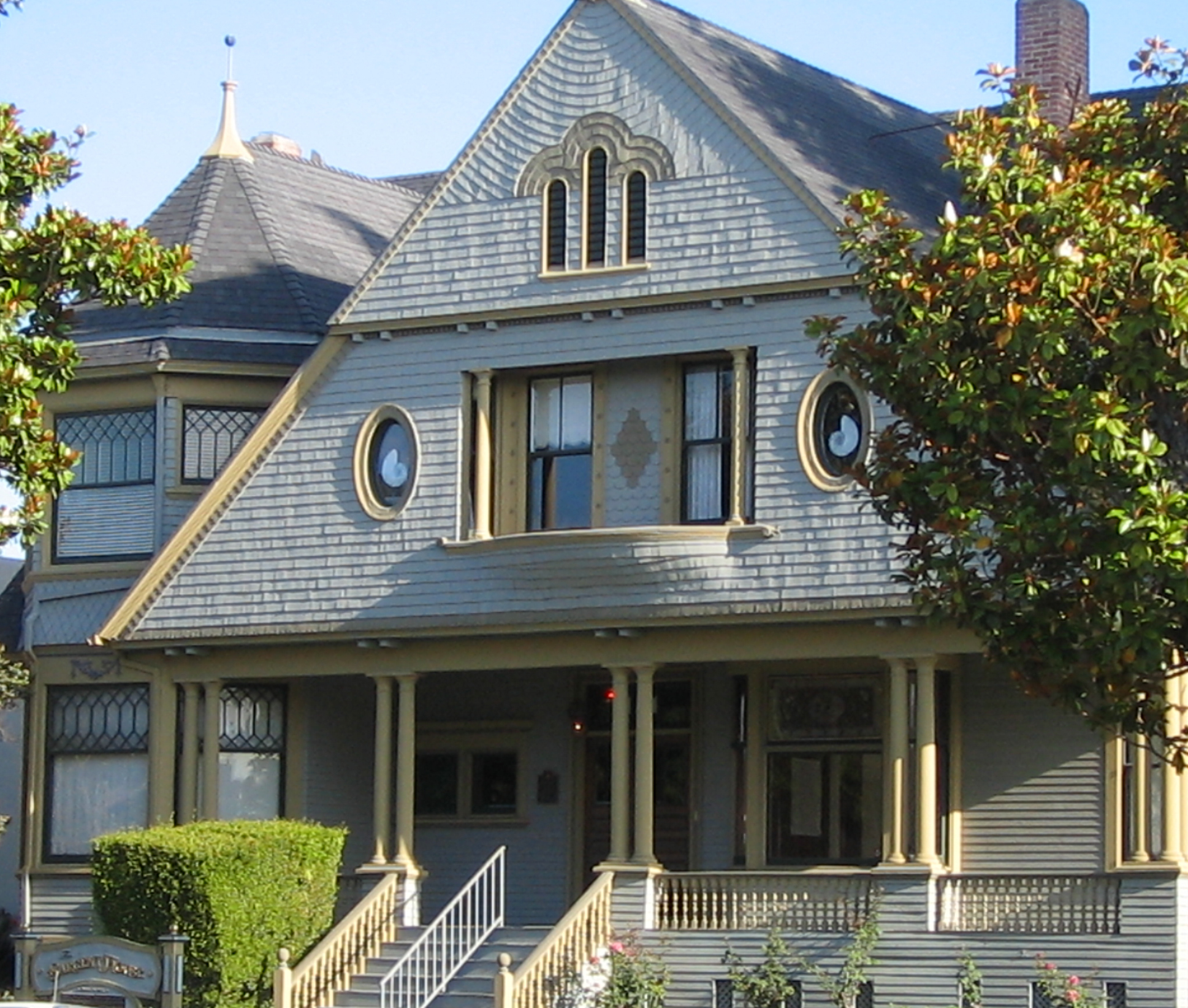
Sargent House, a historic Victorian home on Central Avenue

Following World War II major urban and suburban development converted much farmland to city. The city experienced two particularly strong growth spurts in the 1950s and 1960s, and again in the 1990s and early 2000s. Aerial photographic interpretation indicate such major conversion of cropland to urban uses over the time period 1956 to 1968, while the city annexed the adjacent communities of Alisal and Santa Rita during this time. The Harden Ranch, Creekbridge and Williams Ranch neighborhoods constituting much of the city's North-East were built almost exclusively between 1990 and 2004.

Salinas was also the birthplace of writer and Nobel Prize laureate John Steinbeck. The historic downtown, known as Oldtown Salinas, features much fine Victorian architecture, and is home to the National Steinbeck Center, the Steinbeck House and the John Steinbeck Library.

Major development took place in the 1990s, with the construction of Creekbridge, Williams Ranch, and Harden Ranch.

== Geography ==
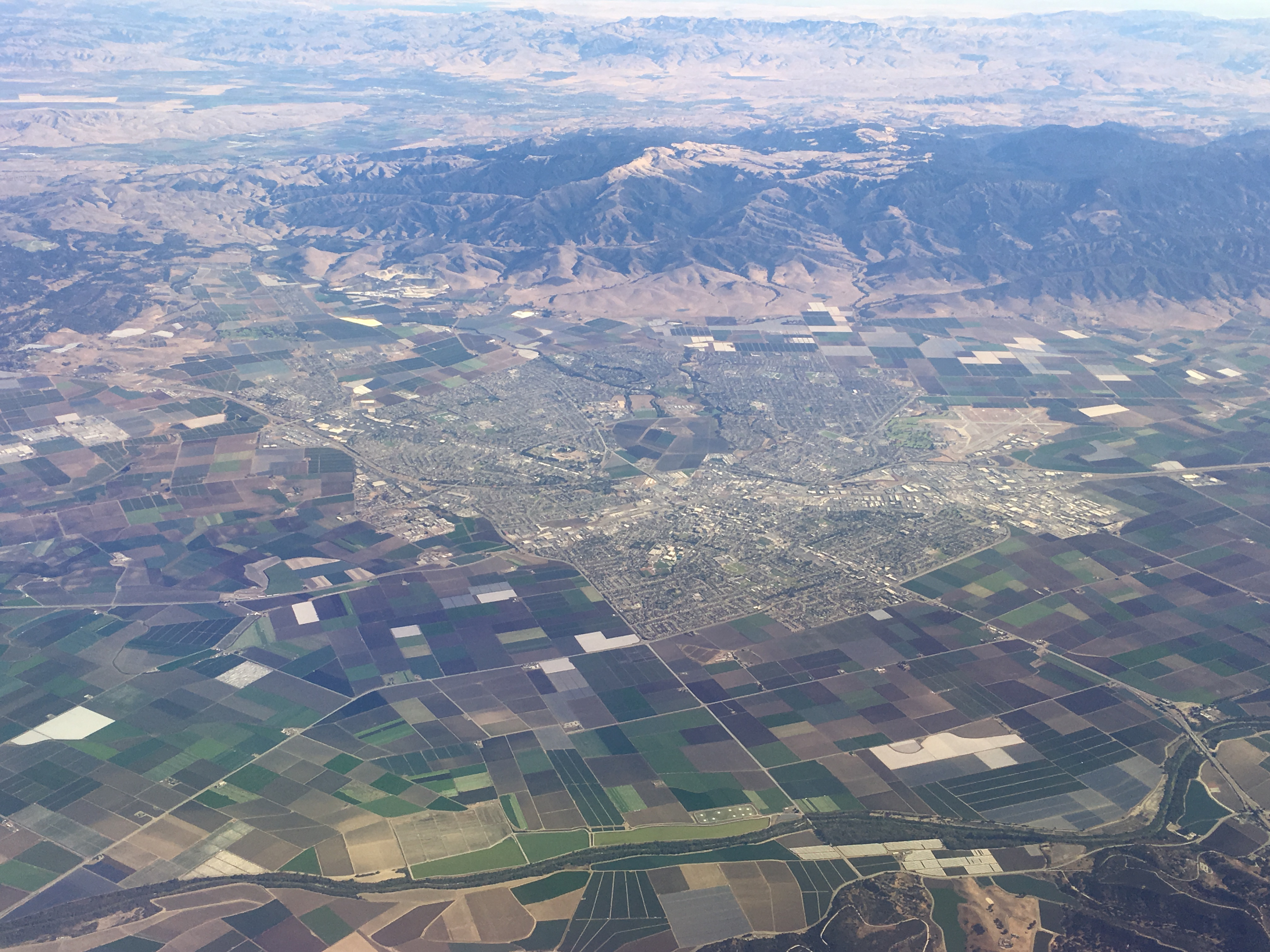
Salinas and the Salinas Valley. Fremont Peak and the Gabilan Range are also shown.

According to the United States Census Bureau, the city has a total area of 23.5 square miles (61 km^{2}), 99.86% of it land and 0.14% of it water.

Prior to mass agricultural and urban development, much of the city consisted of rolling hills bisected by wooded creeks and interspersed with marsh land. Today, the city is located mostly on leveled ground, with some rolling hills and wooded gulches with creeks remaining in the north-eastern Creekbridge and Williams Ranch neighborhoods, as well as the Laurel Heights section of East Salinas. The natural ecosystems accompanying the area's topography and environment have been recreated in Natividad Creek Park and adjacent Upper Carr Lake.

The city rests about 18 meters (59 feet) above sea level, and it is located roughly eight miles from the Pacific Ocean. The Gabilan and Santa Lucia mountain ranges border the Salinas Valley to the east and to the west, respectively. Both mountain ranges and the Salinas Valley run approximately 90 miles (145 km) south-east from Salinas towards King City.

The Salinas River runs the length of the Salinas Valley and empties into the Pacific Ocean at the center of the Monterey Bay. During the summer months the river flows partially underground and it is this extensive underground aquifer that allows for irrigation of cropland in an area without much annual rainfall.

=== Climate ===
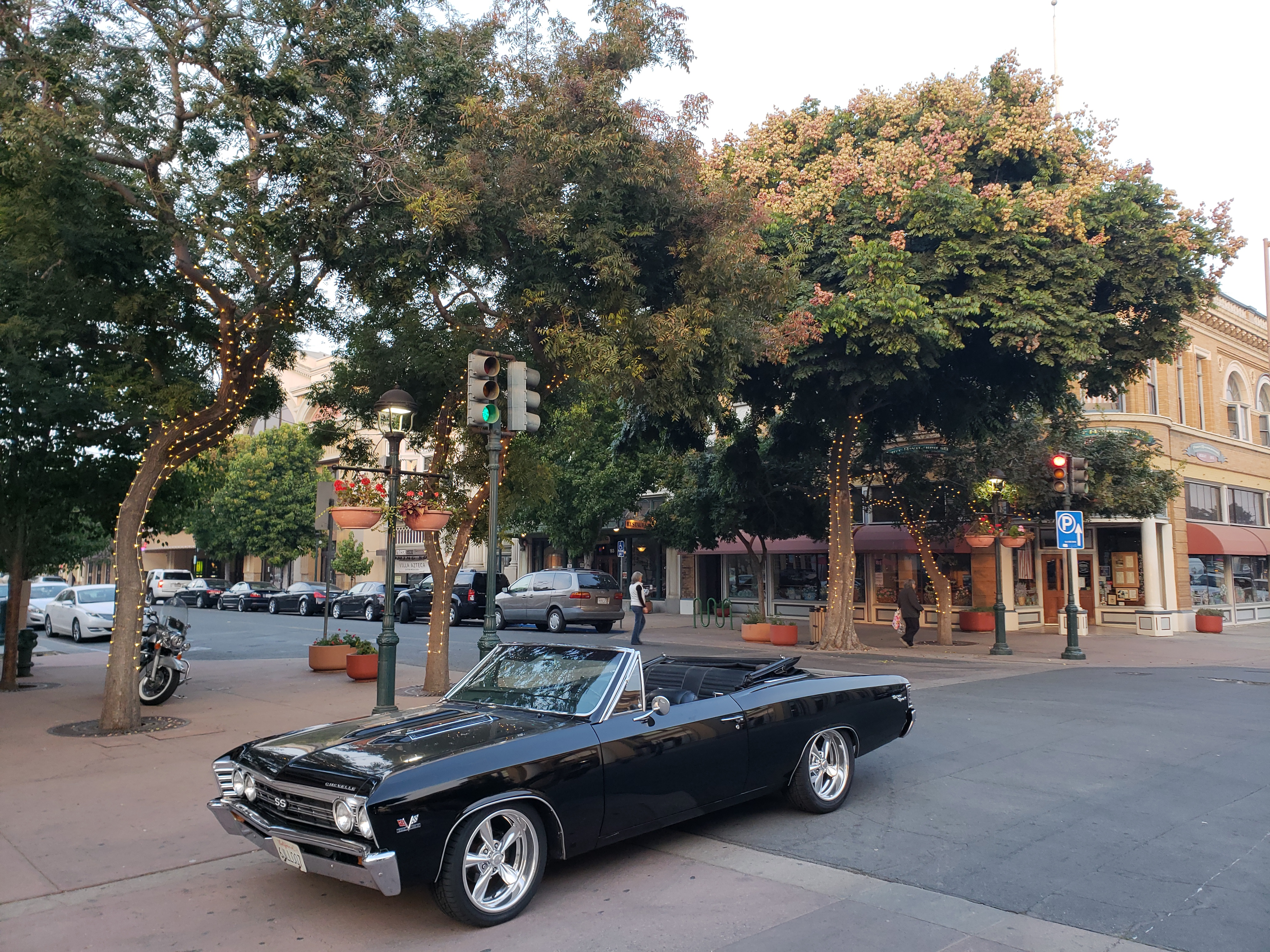
Downtown Salinas in December 2018. Winter months are mild in Salinas.

Salinas has cool and moderate temperatures, due to the "natural air conditioner" that conveys ocean air and fog from the Monterey Bay to Salinas, while towns to the north and south of Salinas experience hotter summers, as mountains block the ocean air. Thus, Salinas weather is closer to that of the Central Coast of California, rather than that of inland valleys, and thus has a mild Mediterranean climate (Köppen Csb) with typical daily highs ranging from 61.6 °F (16.4 °C) in December to 74.4 °F (23.6 °C) in September. The record highest temperature was 109 °F (43 °C) on September 2, 2017. The record lowest temperature was 18 °F (−8 °C) on January 21, 1937. Annually, there are an average of 6.4 days with 90 °F (32 °C)+ highs, and an average of 5.5 days with lows reaching the freezing mark or lower.

The coldest measured daytime high in Salinas was 39 °F (4 °C) on January 21, 1962. The warmest night during the station's operation was 68 °F (20 °C) on September 22, 1939.

In 2015 Salinas was in the top ten American cities for cleanest air quality,

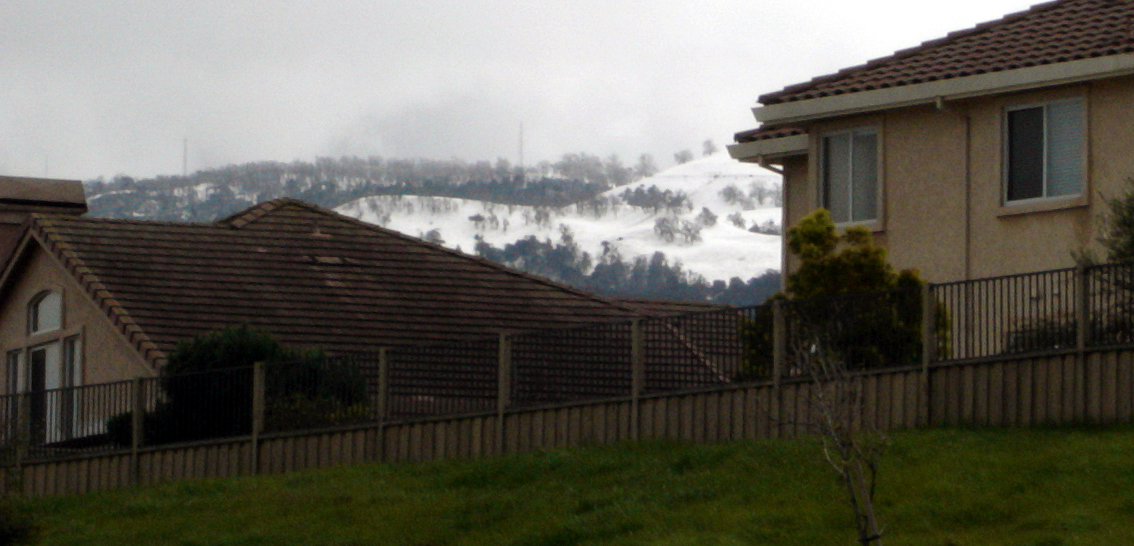
Record-breaking snow covered nearby mountaintops in 2006

The difference between ocean and air temperature also tends to create heavy morning fog during the summer months, known as the marine layer, driven by an onshore wind created by the local high pressure sunny portions of the Salinas Valley, which extend north and south from Salinas and the Bay.

The average annual rainfall for the city is approximately 12.58 inches (319.5 mm). The wettest "rain year" since records at the present station began was from July 1997 to June 1998 with 29.04 inches (737.6 mm) of precipitation, and the driest from July 2001 to June 2002 with 3.65 inches (92.7 mm). The most precipitation in one month was 9.96 inches (253 mm) in February 1998. The record maximum 24-hour precipitation was 3.22 inches (82 mm) on December 11, 2014.

Climate data for Salinas, California (Salinas Municipal Airport), 1991–2020 normals, extremes 1930–present
Month	Jan	Feb	Mar	Apr	May	Jun	Jul	Aug	Sep	Oct	Nov	Dec	Year
Record high °F (°C)	86 (30)	88 (31)	94 (34)	100 (38)	99 (37)	105 (41)	96 (36)	98 (37)	109 (43)	105 (41)	96 (36)	85 (29)	109 (43)
Mean maximum °F (°C)	74.4 (23.6)	76.3 (24.6)	79.6 (26.4)	84.8 (29.3)	85.1 (29.5)	86.6 (30.3)	82.5 (28.1)	86.1 (30.1)	93.1 (33.9)	92.5 (33.6)	83.5 (28.6)	72.3 (22.4)	97.0 (36.1)
Mean daily maximum °F (°C)	62.3 (16.8)	63.3 (17.4)	65.5 (18.6)	67.1 (19.5)	68.3 (20.2)	70.3 (21.3)	70.7 (21.5)	72.4 (22.4)	74.4 (23.6)	73.7 (23.2)	67.7 (19.8)	61.6 (16.4)	68.1 (20.1)
Daily mean °F (°C)	51.9 (11.1)	53.1 (11.7)	55.0 (12.8)	56.7 (13.7)	59.3 (15.2)	61.6 (16.4)	62.9 (17.2)	64.0 (17.8)	64.2 (17.9)	61.6 (16.4)	56.1 (13.4)	51.1 (10.6)	58.1 (14.5)
Mean daily minimum °F (°C)	41.6 (5.3)	42.9 (6.1)	44.5 (6.9)	46.4 (8.0)	50.3 (10.2)	52.9 (11.6)	55.0 (12.8)	55.5 (13.1)	54.0 (12.2)	49.6 (9.8)	44.4 (6.9)	40.6 (4.8)	48.1 (9.0)
Mean minimum °F (°C)	32.0 (0.0)	33.6 (0.9)	36.4 (2.4)	38.3 (3.5)	43.4 (6.3)	47.4 (8.6)	50.8 (10.4)	51.0 (10.6)	47.4 (8.6)	41.3 (5.2)	35.3 (1.8)	31.4 (−0.3)	29.6 (−1.3)
Record low °F (°C)	18 (−8)	25 (−4)	27 (−3)	29 (−2)	34 (1)	39 (4)	42 (6)	42 (6)	36 (2)	28 (−2)	25 (−4)	23 (−5)	18 (−8)
Average precipitation inches (mm)	2.63 (67)	2.42 (61)	2.06 (52)	0.95 (24)	0.38 (9.7)	0.07 (1.8)	0.01 (0.25)	0.03 (0.76)	0.05 (1.3)	0.60 (15)	1.26 (32)	2.12 (54)	12.58 (318.81)
Average precipitation days (≥ 0.01 in)	9.4	9.3	9.0	5.5	2.9	1.1	0.3	0.7	1.0	2.7	5.7	8.4	56.0
Source 1: NOAA
Source 2: National Weather Service

== Demographics ==
Historical population
Census	Pop.	Note	%±
1870	599		—
1880	1,854		209.5%
1890	2,339		26.2%
1900	3,304		41.3%
1910	3,736		13.1%
1920	4,308		15.3%
1930	10,263		138.2%
1940	11,586		12.9%
1950	13,917		20.1%
1960	28,957		108.1%
1970	58,896		103.4%
1980	80,479		36.6%
1990	108,777		35.2%
2000	142,685		31.2%
2010	150,441		5.4%
2020	163,542		8.7%
2024 (est.)	160,783	▼	−1.7%
U.S. Decennial Census

=== 2020 ===
The 2020 United States census reported that Salinas had a population of 163,542. The racial makeup of Salinas was 32% White (12% non-Hispanic White), 1% African American, 6% Asian, 0.1% Native Hawaiian or other Pacific Islander, 1% American Indian and Alaska native, and 7% of two or more races. 79% of the population was of Hispanic or Latino origin, of any race.

The median household income was $67,914, and the median income per capita was $23,707. About 14% of the population lived below the poverty line.

Salinas, California – Racial and ethnic composition Note: the US Census treats Hispanic/Latino as an ethnic category. This table excludes Latinos from the racial categories and assigns them to a separate category. Hispanics/Latinos may be of any race.
Race / Ethnicity (NH = Non-Hispanic)	Pop 2000	Pop 2010	Pop 2020	% 2000	% 2010	% 2020
White alone (NH)	36,535	23,333	18,351	24.19%	15.51%	11.22%
Black or African American alone (NH)	4,569	2,343	1,927	3.02%	1.56%	1.18%
Native American or Alaska Native alone (NH)	636	418	428	0.42%	0.28%	0.26%
Asian alone (NH)	8,840	8,677	8,870	5.85%	5.77%	5.42%
Pacific Islander alone (NH)	275	383	342	0.18%	0.25%	0.21%
Some Other Race alone (NH)	508	218	651	0.34%	0.14%	0.40%
Mixed Race or Multi-Racial (NH)	2,817	2,270	2,795	1.86%	1.51%	1.71%
Hispanic or Latino (any race)	96,880	112,799	130,178	64.13%	74.98%	79.60%
Total	151,060	150,441	163,542	100.00%	100.00%	100.00%

=== 2010 ===
The 2010 United States census reported that Salinas had a population of 150,441. The population density was 6,479.8 inhabitants per square mile (2,501.9/km^{2}). The racial makeup of Salinas was 68,973 (45.8%) White, down from 90.3% in 1970, 2,993 (2.0%) African American, 1,888 (1.3%) Native American, 9,438 (6.3%) Asian, 478 (0.3%) Pacific Islander, 59,041 (39.2%) from other races, and 7,630 (5.1%) from two or more races. There were 112,799 residents of Hispanic or Latino origin, of any race (75.0%).

The Census reported that 147,976 people (98.4% of the population) lived in households, 658 (0.4%) lived in non-institutionalized group quarters, and 1,807 (1.2%) were institutionalized.

There were 40,387 households, out of which 21,435 (53.1%) had children under the age of 18 living in them, 21,380 (52.9%) were opposite-sex married couples living together, 6,835 (16.9%) had a female householder with no husband present, 3,300 (8.2%) had a male householder with no wife present. There were 3,271 (8.1%) unmarried opposite-sex partnerships, and 271 (0.7%) same-sex married couples or partnerships. 6,895 households (17.1%) were made up of individuals, and 2,587 (6.4%) had someone living alone who was 65 years of age or older. The average household size was 3.66. There were 31,515 families (78.0% of all households); the average family size was 4.05.

There were 47,180 residents (31.4%) under the age of 18, 18,049 (12.0%) aged 18 to 24, 44,978 (29.9%) aged 25 to 44, 28,976 (19.3%) aged 45 to 64, and 11,258 (7.5%) who were 65 years of age or older. The median age was 28.8 years. For every 100 females, there were 102.1 males. For every 100 females age 18 and over, there were 100.8 males.

There were 42,651 housing units at an average density of 1,837.1 units per square mile (709.3 units/km^{2}), of which 18,198 (45.1%) were owner-occupied, and 22,189 (54.9%) were occupied by renters. The homeowner vacancy rate was 2.5%; the rental vacancy rate was 4.6%. 65,108 people (43.3% of the population) lived in owner-occupied housing units and 82,868 people (55.1%) lived in rental housing units. The majority of residents were living in single-unit detached homes, built between 1950 and 2000, while one third of the housing stock had three or more units per structure.

=== 2000 ===
The 2000 United States Census reported that Salinas had a population of 151,060. The population density was 7,948.4 inhabitants per square mile (3,068.9/km^{2}). There were 39,659 housing units at an average density of 2,086.8 units per square mile (805.7 units/km^{2}). The racial makeup of the city was 65.2% 49.1% White, 6.2% Asian American, 3.3% African American, 1.3% Native American, 38.7% from other races, and 5.1% from two or more races. 65.2% of the population was Hispanic or Latino, of any race.

49.2% had children under the age of 18 living with them, 57.6% were married couples living together, 14.8% had a female householder with no husband present, and 21.6% were non-families. 17.1% of all households were made up of individuals, and 6.5% had someone living alone who was 65 years of age or older. The average household size was 3.69 people, and the average family contained 4.08 members.

The age distribution was 33.0% under the age of 19 or younger, 11.8% from 18 to 24, 33.7% from 25 to 44, 15.5% from 45 to 64, and 7.1% who were 65 years of age or older. The median age was 28 years. For every 100 females, there were 117.7 males. For every 102 females age 18 and over, there were 117.4 males.

The median household income was $43,728, and the median family income was $44,669. Males had a median income of $35,641 versus $27,013 for females. The per capita income for the city was $14,495. About 12.8% of families and 16.7% of the population were below the poverty line, including 20.1% of those under age 18 and 9.4% of those age 65 or over.

Household incomes in the city tended to be significantly higher alongside the city limits, especially in the northern Harden Ranch and Creekbridge neighborhoods. East Salinas and the downtown area suffered from a very low median household income as well as high crime rates. South and North Salinas featured roughly the same level of median households income with the latter being home to city's wealthiest newly constructed neighborhoods.

=== Crime ===
Salinas has a significant, but declining problem with organized street gangs, such as Nortenos, Surenos, and Crips and the associated violent crime. According to the U.S. Bureau of Justice Statistics, the city's overall violent crime and homicide rates are above those for California and the nation overall. However, the violent crime rate in Salinas has declined by almost 75 percent since 2015. Gang activity and violent crime are focused in Central and East Salinas and exacerbated by the city's comparatively low tax base and consequently limited policing resources. A hypothesis to explain the city's particularly intense problem with gang related violent crime cites the city's proximity to Salinas Valley State Prison. The prison was an early launch pad for street operations of the notorious prison gang, Nuestra Familia. This in turn, is seen as having spawned a legacy of multi-generational gang membership among the poorer and less educated residents of East Salinas.

== Economy ==
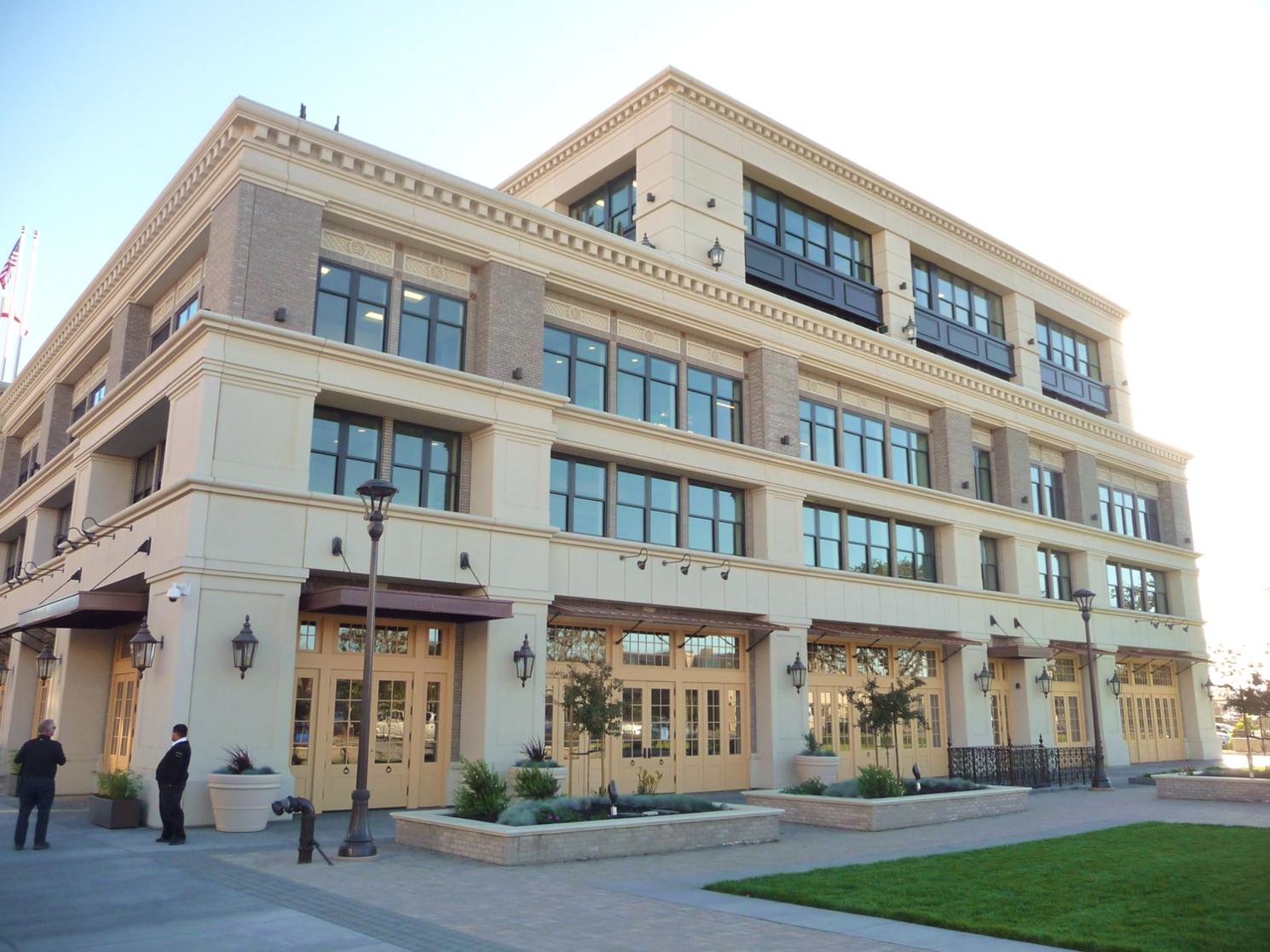
The headquarters of Taylor Farms in Downtown Salinas, was constructed in 2015.

Major employers in Salinas include Taylor Farms, Tanimura & Antle, Salinas Valley Memorial Hospital, Natividad Hospital, Mann Packing, Hilltown Packing, Newstar Fresh Foods, Matsui Nursery and Monterey County.

Salinas is known as a hub of the agricultural technology industry. Its close proximity to Silicon Valley and large number of agricultural employers has created a hotbed of developing high tech agricultural innovations.

=== Forbes AgTech Summit ===
Since 2015, Forbes has hosted the yearly Forbes AgTech Summit in Salinas. The event draws agricultural technology entrepreneurs from around the world and includes speakers, group discussions, tours, on site demonstrations.

== Sections and neighborhoods ==
=== North Salinas ===
- Harden Ranch
- Santa Rita
- Northridge
- Santa Lucia Village
- Sherwood Gardens
- Creekbridge

=== East Salinas ===
- Sunset
- Alisal
- Monte Bella
- Williams Ranch

=== South Salinas ===
- Maple Park

=== West Salinas ===
- Laurelwood
- Boronda is an unincorporated community in close proximity to the Westridge neighborhood.
- Westridge

=== Downtown ===
- Old Town

== Arts and culture ==
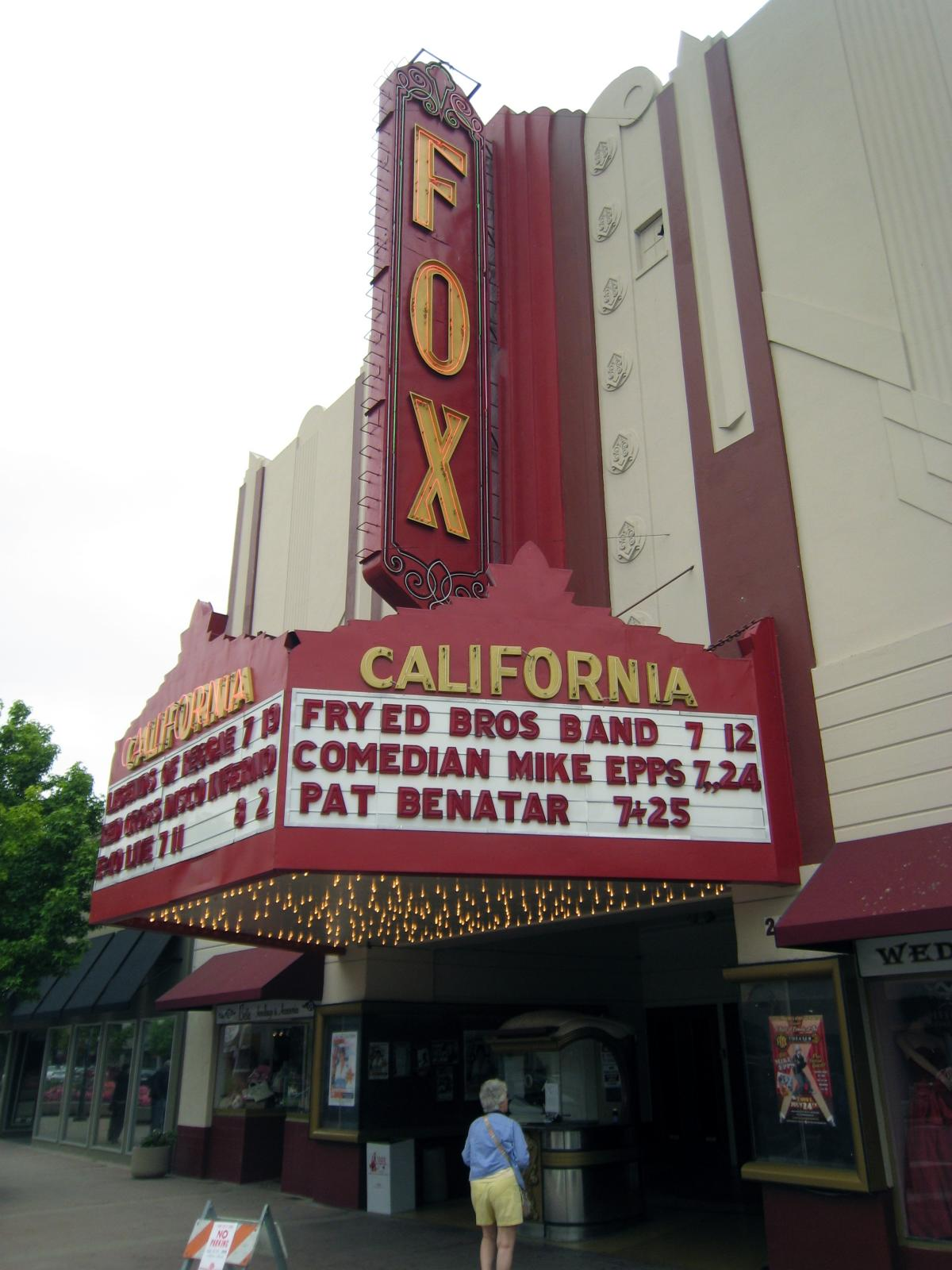
Fox California Theatre.

Hat In Three Stages of Landing by Claes Oldenburg and Coosje van Bruggen

Salinas has an emerging arts scene led by the First Fridays Art Walk and the innovative use of non-traditional or business venues to exhibit art and host live local music. The oldest gallery in Salinas, the Valley Art Gallery, has been active for over 30 years. The Hartnell College Gallery hosts world-class exhibitions of art during the school year. The National Steinbeck Center has two galleries with changing exhibits, and the city's newest @Risk Gallery features humdrum exhibitions. The Art Walk, held in the downtown area, features 50 venues.

Live theater companies in Salinas include ARIEL Theatrical located in the Karen Wilson's Children's Theater in Oldtown Salinas, and The Western Stage, based at Hartnell College.

Live local music is available at many restaurants in the downtown area, and during the First Fridays Art Walk. Concerts are held at the historic Fox California Theater, Steinbeck Institute for Arts and Culture and the Salinas Sports Complex, as well as at Hartnell College.

Salinas is home to many public murals, including work by John Cerney which can be viewed in the agricultural fields surrounding the city. Claes Oldenburg placed his sculpture, Hat in Three Stages of Landing, in Sherwood Park at the center of the city.

The city contains several art deco buildings, including the Monterey County Courthouse and the Salinas Californian Building.

=== Cultural events ===
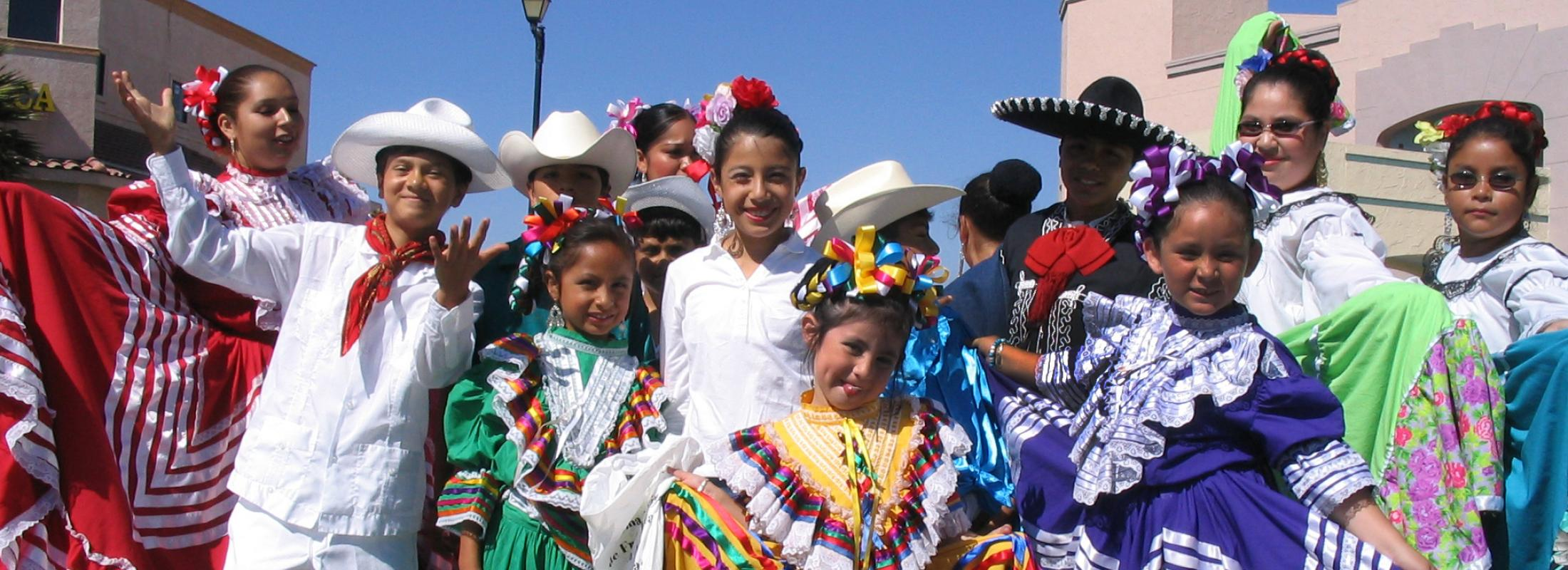
Salinas youth at the El Grito Cultural Festival, an annual celebration.

==== El Grito ====
El Grito is a free annual event held every September in the Alisal Neighborhood of Salinas. The event draws up to 65,000 people and features a parade, performances, vendors, Mexican cuisine, and cultural exhibits. El Grito is a celebration of the beginning of the Mexican War of Independence.

==== Founders Day ====
Salinas Founders Day is an annual event held since 1869, that celebrates the history of Salinas. The 2017 event was held at the Salinas Train Station Plaza in downtown Salinas, and included tours of the First Mayor's House and the Monterey and Salinas Valley Railroad Museum, music, and historical talks.

==== Ciclovía Salinas ====
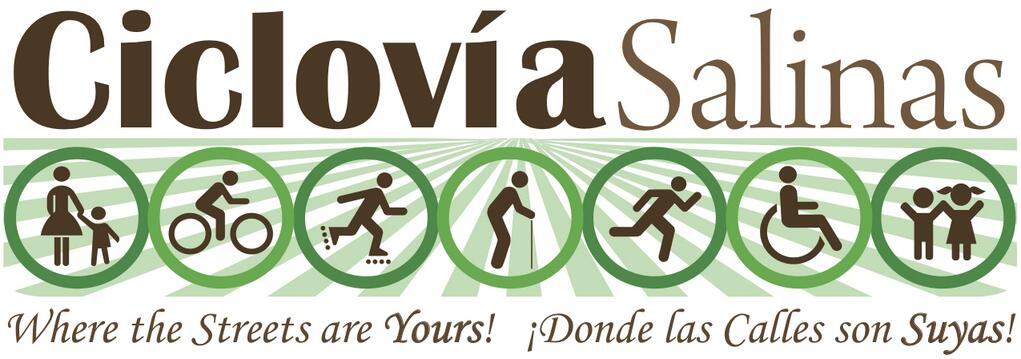
Ciclovía Salinas.

Ciclovía Salinas is an annual event that has taken place in the Alisal neighborhood of Salinas since 2013, and features a 1.5 mile stretch of Alisal Street that is closed off to automobiles, and exclusively for use of pedestrians, bicyclists, and other non-motorized forms of transportation. The goal of the event is to promote youth leadership, walking, biking, and other recreational activities that promote a healthy lifestyle.

The event is led entirely by Salinas youth volunteers and in 2018, it featured a 3-kilometer run, Cross Fit activities, soccer, zumba, boxing, community created murals, disc golf, folklorico dancing, and Oaxacan cultural dancing.

==== California Rodeo Salinas ====
As the host of a PRCA-sanctioned rodeo, Salinas is a major stop on the professional rodeo circuit. The California Rodeo Salinas began in 1911 as a Wild West Show on the site of the old race track ground, now the Salinas Sports Complex. Every third week of July is Big Week, when cowboys and fans come for the traditional rodeo competitions, including bull riding. Rodeo-related events held in Salinas and Monterey include cowboy poetry, wine tasting, a carnival, barbecues and a gala cowboy ball.

==== Kiddie Kapers Parade ====
The Kiddie Kapers Parade began in 1930 and is an annual parade with only children in costume, held in conjunction with "Big Week" and the annual Rodeo.

==== Salinas Asian Festival ====
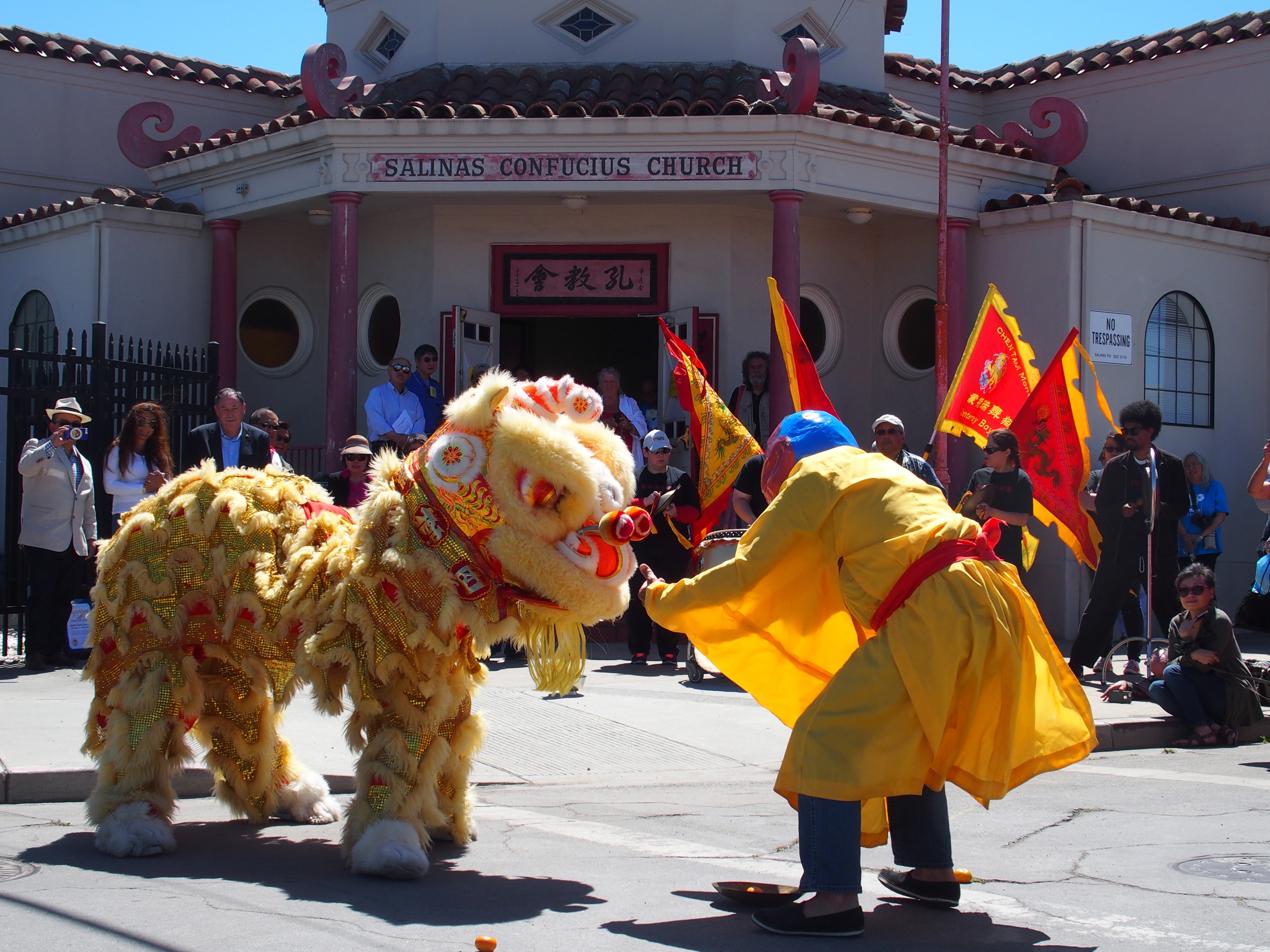
The Lion Dance at 2017 Salinas Asian Festival, in front of the Salinas Confucius Church.

The Salinas Asian Festival is a free annual event in Salinas held since 2009 that celebrates the culture and history of Chinese, Filipino, and Japanese immigrants in Salinas. The Salinas Buddhist Temple, the Salinas Chinese Association, and the Filipino Cultural Center of Salinas are open to tour. The event includes food, demonstrations of tai chi, Filipino folk dancing, kendo, and a bonsai display. The 2017 festival the Salinas Chinatown Virtual Walking Tour.

=== Points of interest ===
==== John Steinbeck House ====
The John Steinbeck House was the birthplace and childhood home of author John Steinbeck, and is now home to a restaurant. The house was built in 1897 and is a Queen Anne style Victorian.

==== Boronda Adobe History Center ====
Just outside the official city limits, the restored adobe dwelling constructed in 1844 by José Eusebio Boronda, rests on one of the original Mexican land grants. The Boronda Adobe is a California Historical Landmark and listed in the National Register of Historic Places and holds a museum of early Salinas and California history. Other historic buildings are located here, including the Lagunita School house John Steinbeck wrote about in the Red Pony. The site also holds the official archive of Monterey County, open to researchers by appointment.

==== Santa Lucia Highlands American Viticultural Area ====
Santa Lucia Highlands AVA is nearby so the area is becoming a destination for wine tasting.

== Education ==
=== School districts ===
Salinas has seven public school districts serving the city core and adjacent unincorporated areas. The largest school district in Salinas is the Salinas Union High School District (grades 7–12) with 13,578 students enrolled in 10 campuses. The Salinas City Elementary School District is the largest elementary school district in Salinas, with 13 schools and 7,954 students. Other districts include Santa Rita Union Elementary School District, Graves Elementary School District, Washington Union School District, Lagunita School District, and Alisal Union School District.

Private Catholic schools in the city include Palma School and the all-girls Notre Dame High School.

=== Higher education ===
Hartnell College, as well as a satellite campus of California State University, Monterey Bay, are located in Salinas.

== Media ==
Local newspapers include The Salinas Californian, Monterey County Weekly and Monterey County Herald.

Local radio stations include:

- KION/1460
- KTGE/1570
- KHDC/90.9
- KPRC-FM/100.7
- KDON-FM/102.5
- KRAY-FM/103.5
- KOCN/105.1
- KSQL/99.1
- KBRG/100.3
- KVVF/105.7

Television service for the community comes from the Monterey-Salinas-Santa Cruz designated market area (DMA). KSMS-TV Channel 67, KION-TV Channel 46 and KSBW Channel 8 provide news for the area as the area's Univision, CBS, NBC and ABC affiliates.

== Infrastructure ==
=== Transportation ===
==== Highways and roads ====
U.S. Route 101 is the major north–south highway in Salinas, linking the city to the rest of the Central Coast region, San Francisco to the north, and Los Angeles to the south. California State Route 68 heads west to Monterey, while California State Route 183 runs northwest to Castroville.

==== Rail ====
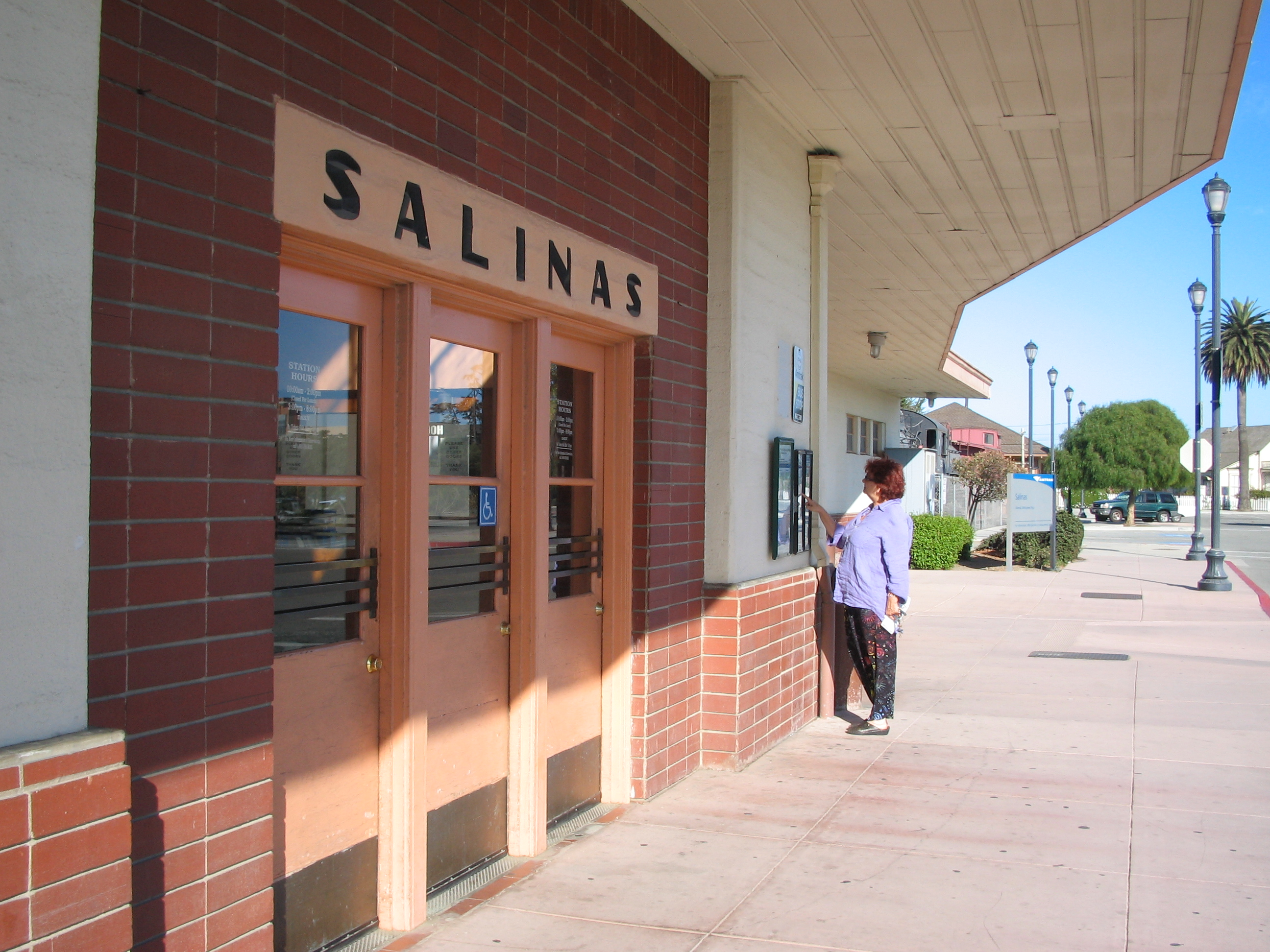
Art Deco-style Amtrak train station in Salinas

Amtrak, the national passenger rail system, serves Salinas. Its Coast Starlight train runs daily in each direction between Seattle, Washington, and Los Angeles, stopping in Salinas.

The Salinas Rail extension aims to provide two daily round-trips by rail to Gilroy and San Jose Diridon station by 2028.

==== Bus ====
Public transportation via bus is provided by Monterey–Salinas Transit (MST). Public buses take passengers throughout the county, as well as San Jose and Gilroy. Buses to San Jose and Gilroy connect to Caltrain and Amtrak in those cities.

Greyhound operates from the Salinas Amtrak station with service to other California cities and throughout the United States.

==== Airport ====
Salinas Municipal Airport is located on the southeastern boundary of the City of Salinas, 3 miles (4.8 km) from the city center. It is a general aviation facility occupying 763 acres (3.1 km^{2}), with two runways serving single and twin engine aircraft and helicopters, as well as an increasing number of turbopropeller and turbine-powered business jets.

The airport has an air traffic control tower in operation twelve hours a day, seven days a week. The airport terminal is located on Mortensen Avenue and houses airport office staff as well as professional offices. Salinas Airport Commissioners agreed to a proposed project that would bring a 100-room hotel, offices and hangars to a vacant lot in front of the Salinas Municipal Airport terminal. The Salinas Jet Center would include a national chain hotel, 80,000 square feet (7,000 m^{2}) of office space, four large complexes combining more offices with airplane hangars and a 24-hour, full-service aircraft fueling station. The project would also include a taxiway to allow planes to access the new hangars.

The airport has full Instrument Landing System (ILS) and VHF omnidirectional range (VOR) located on the airport. The ILS has a Medium Intensity Approach Lighting System, with Runway Alignment Indicator Lights. The VOR approach has Runway End Identifier Lights. All but the ILS runway, RWY 31, have Visual Approach Slope Indicators (VASIs).

The airport is the site of the California International Airshow, set annually in the late summer or early autumn. The event draws thousands of visitors to Salinas over its three-day run.

=== Hospitals ===
Salinas and its surrounding towns are served by Salinas Valley Memorial Hospital and Natividad Medical Center, both located in Salinas. Natividad is one of the University of California, San Francisco's teaching hospitals and is owned and operated by Monterey County. Salinas Valley Memorial Hospital and Healthcare System is a public district hospital run by an elected board of directors.

Natividad Medical Center, through its affiliated Natividad Medical Foundation, offers trained medical interpreters for speakers of several Oaxacan languages (including Triqui, Mixteco, and Zapotec) as well as Spanish.

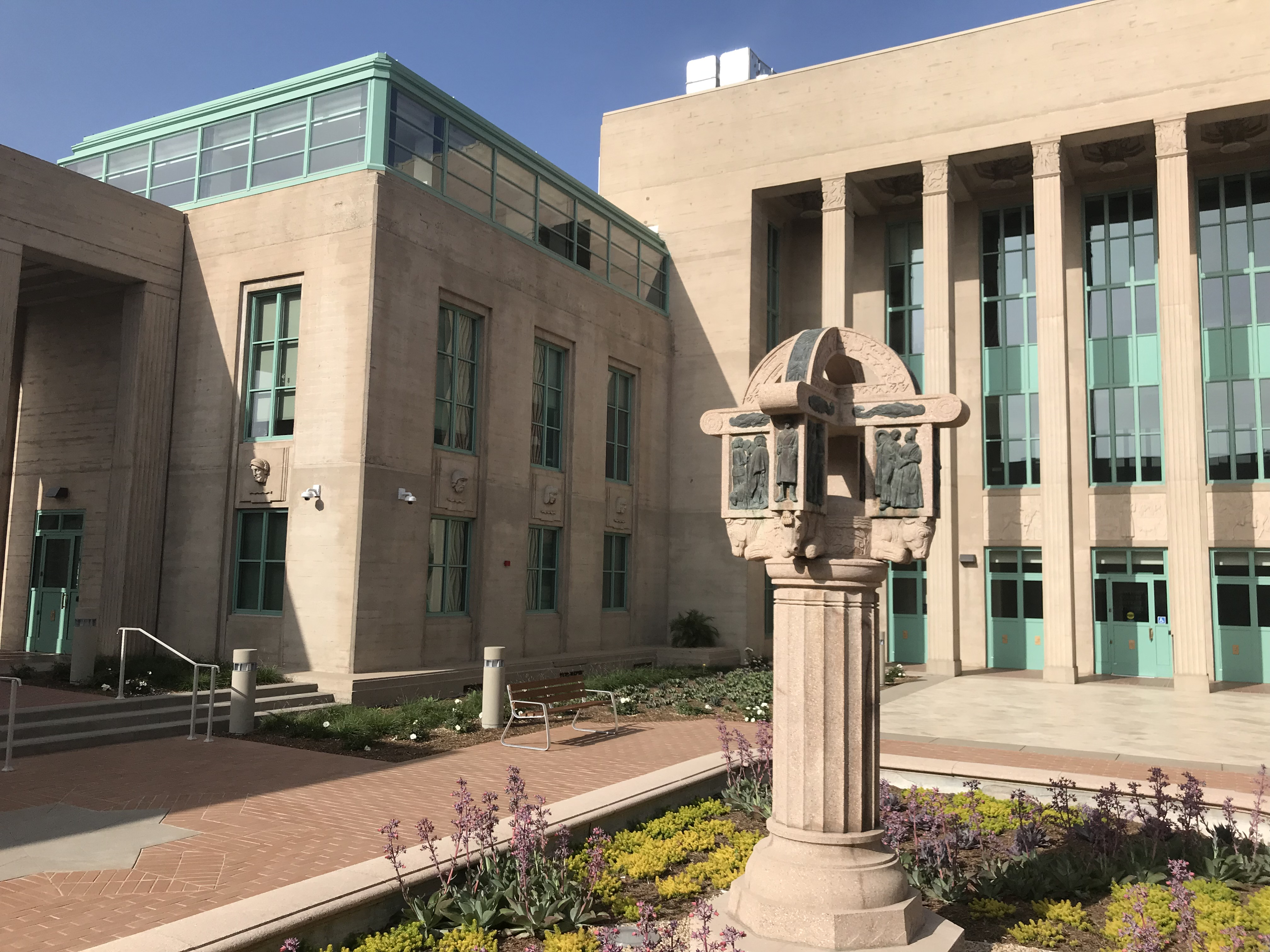
The Historic and Former Monterey County Courthouse after 2018 renovations

=== Facilities ===
The Monterey County Jail is located in North Salinas and the Monterey County Juvenile Detention Center is located in the north side as well.

== Notable people ==
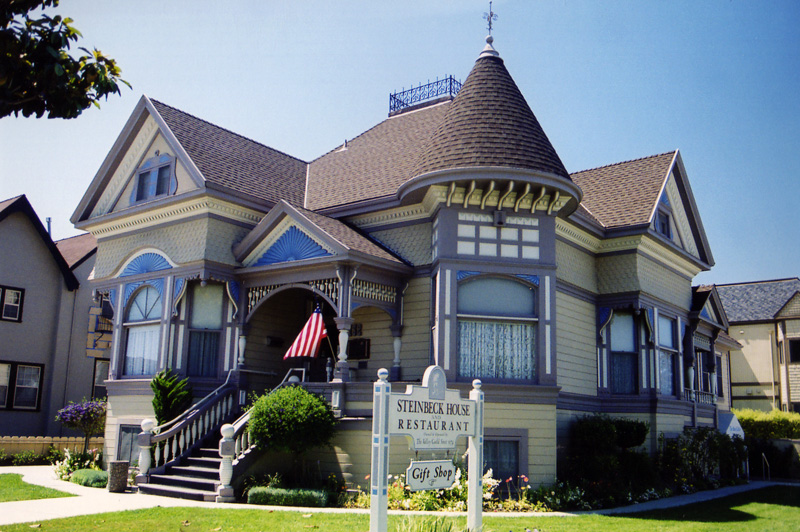
Steinbeck House in downtown Salinas

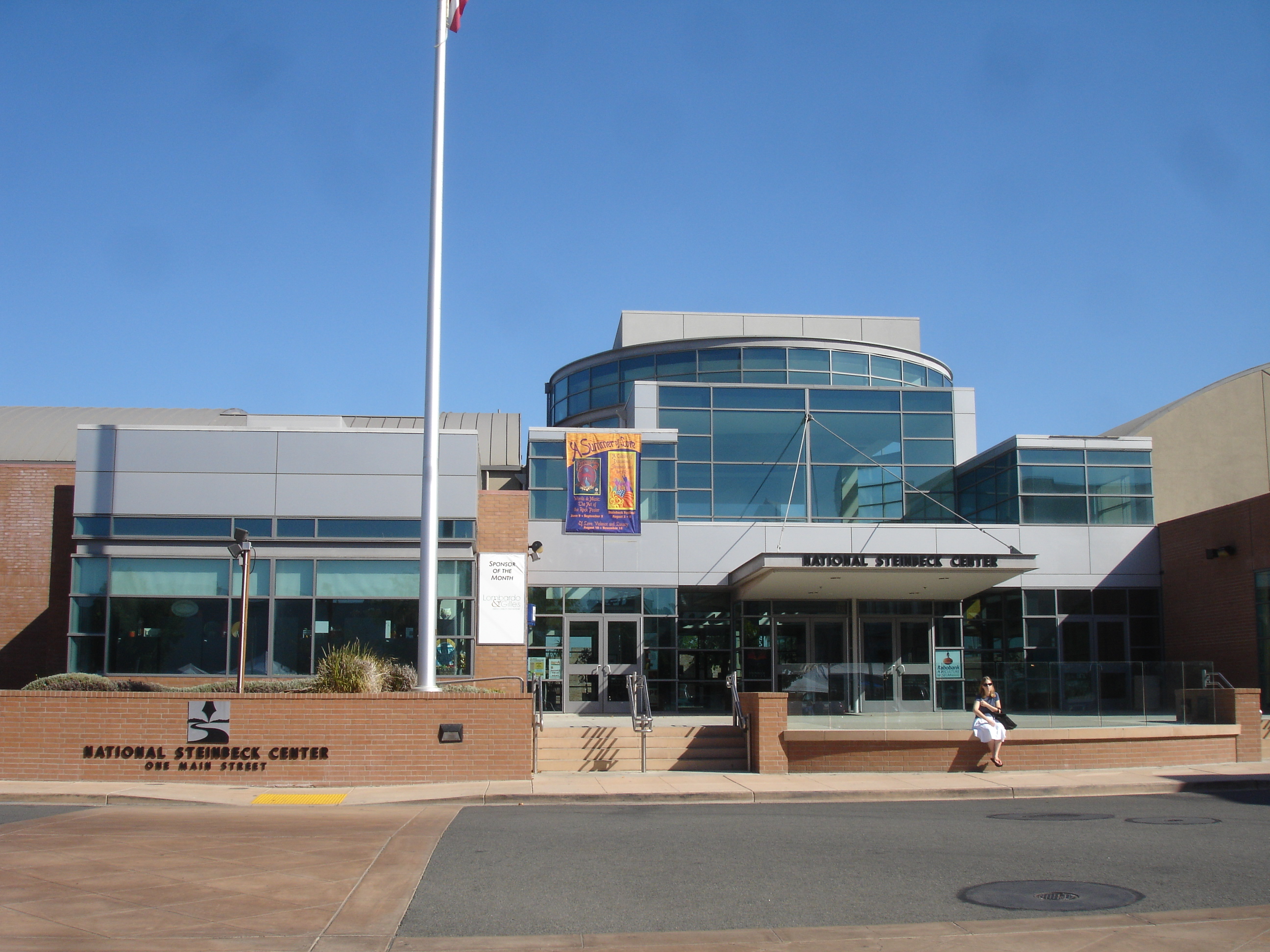
National Steinbeck Center, devoted to John Steinbeck

- Monica Abbott (born 1985), 2008 Olympic softball pitcher
- Everett Alvarez Jr., U.S. Navy pilot and prisoner of war
- Dustin Lance Black (born 1974), Academy Award-winning screenwriter
- Lester D. Boronda (1886–1953), painter, furniture designer
- Ernie Camacho (born 1955), Major League Baseball pitcher
- Jose Celaya (born 1981), boxer
- Doug Chandler, Hall of Fame motorcycle racer, Grand Slam winner, World Superbike champion
- Ramiro Corrales, former Major League Soccer defender with the San Jose Earthquakes
- Cordell Crockett, bass guitarist with band Ugly Kid Joe
- Chris Dalman, National Football League offensive lineman and coach
- Drew Dalman, National Football League offensive lineman with the Atlanta Falcons
- Harold Davis, athlete in National Track and Field Hall of Fame
- Amy Díaz-Infante, visual artist and educator
- Evan Dietrich-Smith, Tampa Bay Buccaneers offensive lineman, Super Bowl XLV champion (2011 with Green Bay Packers), Salinas High School graduate, class of 2004
- Nick Duron (born 1996), baseball pitcher in the San Francisco Giants organization
- David Esquer, head coach of the Stanford Cardinal baseball team, graduate of Palma High School
- David Estrada (born 1988), UCLA soccer player (midfield, forward), drafted in first round (11th overall) of 2010 MLS SuperDraft by Seattle Sounders FC
- Verna Felton (1890–1966), actress
- Michael Gasperson (born 1982), NFL wide receiver
- Susan Gerbic (born 1962), skeptical activist
- Brandi Glanville (born 1972), fashion model, television personality in The Real Housewives of Beverly Hills
- Jackie Greene, singer-songwriter and blues musician
- Sammy Hagar (born 1947), singer, former member of Van Halen, now in bands Chickenfoot and Waboritas
- Noah Harpster, actor
- Alvin and Calvin Harrison (born 1974, twins) 1996 Olympic track and field athletes
- Vanessa Hudgens (born 1988), singer and actress, High School Musical
- Ernie Irvan (born 1959), race car driver and winner of the 1991 Daytona 500
- Joe Kapp (1938–2023), quarterback for University of California, Berkeley in College Football Hall of Fame, 1969 NFL champion
- Marie D. Kassing, organization founder
- Slim Keith (1917–1990), socialite
- Craig Kilborn (born 1962), television personality
- Rick Law, Disney artist and producer
- Howard H. Leach, businessman and diplomat
- Sacheen Littlefeather (1946–2022), actress and activist for Native American rights.
- Thomas Merrill (born 1987), professional racecar driver
- Herbert Mullin (1947–2022), serial killer
- Xavier Nady (born 1978), Major League Baseball player, Salinas High School graduate, class of 1997
- Carl Nicks (born 1985), offensive linemen, Super Bowl XLIV champion (2010), North Salinas High School graduate
- Kassim Osgood (born 1980), National Football League wide receiver, Pro Bowl, North Salinas High School
- Van Partible, cartoonist, creator of Johnny Bravo
- Ernie Reyes Sr., American martial artist, actor and fight choreographer
- Mike Rianda, writer and director of The Mitchells vs. the Machines
- Monty Roberts (born 1935), horse tamer and author of The Man Who Listens to Horses
- Del Rodgers (born 1960), NFL running back
- Gary Shipman, artist, comic book illustrator and creator of Pakkins' Land
- Brendon Small, actor, composer, musician, known as creator of the animated series Home Movies and Metalocalypse
- Edward Soriano (born 1946), retired United States Army Lieutenant General
- Sam Spence (1927–2016), NFL Films composer
- John Steinbeck (1902–1968), author and Nobel laureate in literature, author of The Grapes of Wrath, East of Eden (which is largely set in Salinas), and Of Mice and Men, among others
- Rita Taggart, actress
- Anthony Toney (born 1962), NFL running back
- Sean D. Tucker (born 1952), aerobatic stunt pilot
- Elliot Vallejo (born 1984), NFL offensive lineman, Palma High School
- Cain Velasquez, UFC heavyweight champion, mixed martial arts fighter and former collegiate wrestler
- Ruben Villa IV, boxer, Everett Alvarez High School graduate, class of 2016

== In popular culture ==
- Marilyn Monroe, actress and Twentieth Century Fox starlet, was honored as the Diamond Queen of Salinas on February 20, 1948.
- Salinas is mentioned in various John Steinbeck novels, and is the setting of his monumental novel East of Eden.

== Sister cities ==
Salinas' sister cities are:

- Cebu City, Philippines (1964)
- Ichikikushikino, Japan (1979)
- Jerécuaro, Mexico (1996)
- Guanajuato, Mexico (2007)
- (Republic of Ireland) Drogheda, Ireland (2012)
- Söke, Turkey (2015)
- Seogwipo, South Korea (2018)

== See also ==
- Salinas Valley
- Salinas lettuce strike of 1934
- United Farm Workers
- John Steinbeck
