= California Rodeo Salinas =

Annual rodeo

Coordinates: 36°41′38″N 121°38′59″W

- Genre: Rodeo
- Frequency: annually
- Locations: 1034 North Main Street, Salinas, California
- Website: Official website

Salinas is a major stop on the Professional Rodeo Cowboys Association (PRCA) circuit. The Salinas rodeo (pronounced the Spanish way: "roDAYo") began in 1911 as a Wild West Show on the site of the old race track ground, now the Salinas Sports Complex. The rodeo was inducted into the ProRodeo Hall of Fame in 2008.

== History ==
=== Origins ===
The history of the California Rodeo begins in the days of the Spanish Rancheros. Cattle were semi-wild and a herd would contain animals from a variety of different owners, each with his own unique brand to distinguish his animal from his neighbor's. Round-ups, or "rodears" — the Spanish equivalent, occurred in the fall and spring. Owners would track down and herd as many animals as they could find, and bring them to a central, predetermined location—usually a valley. In the spring, the purpose of the roundup was for branding, ear-marking, and castration. In the fall, animals were slaughtered for hide and tallow. These events also served as a social gathering. They could last up to or over a week and often included barbecues, fandangos, and competitions in roping and bronco riding.

=== 1872–1935 ===
==== Sausal Park Race Track and the Beginnings of the Rodeo ====
The Sausal Park Race Track was the predecessor of the California Rodeo. In 1872, a racetrack, grandstand, bar, and restaurant were constructed by the Monterey County Agricultural Association on 69.4 acres (281,000 m^{2}) in Salinas. The land was donated to the city by Eugene Sherwood and Richard Hellman of San Francisco, on the condition that a fair and race would be held at least once every two years. If the city did not hold to this condition, then the property would go back to its former owners. The first race was held in 1875. The Monterey Fair Association was incorporated and the racetrack was also used by the Pacific Coast Trotting Association. In 1878, the park was renamed Sherwood Park. By 1909, the popularity of the races had decreased dramatically, and the future of the property was in question, due to the condition put on it by its former owners when it was given to the city — that a race had to be held once every two years.

The solution for the city came from a group of cattlemen whose informal club went by the name of the "Salinas Coyotes." (The main activity of the club was a bull's-head BBQ with generous amounts of bourbon whiskey!) Iver "Red" Cornett thought that having bucking horses in between the races would draw more interest from the public. The first show was held in 1910 at a baseball park on West Market Street. The show was very successful and the next year was moved to the racetrack at Sherwood Park.

On August 1, 1911, the first rodeo was held at the racetrack grounds. It was advertised as a Wild West Show. Because it ran for a week, Iver "Red" Cornett wanted to call it "Big Week." Frank Griffin wanted to call it "The California Rodeo." Both names are still used today. The founders of the rodeo, in addition to the two mentioned above, were H.E. Abbott, James E. Breen, Sam Matthews, Lawrence "Butch" Beevers, Arthur Hebbron, Julius Trescony, John Bryan, E.J. Redmond, Ed Bordieu, A.J. Zabala, P.E. Zabala and H.W. Lynch.

The first horse parade down Main Street was held in 1911. It was led by James R. Hebbron, who led every parade after that until 1926—the year he turned 97. The parade consisted of a 16-part band and about 100 horses ridden by nearby ranchers. There was another parade that was held on the evening of the closing night. It was less formal and consisted of the few cars that could be decorated, rather than horses.

The rodeo in 1912 was even more successful than the one the year before. This was the first time that cowgirls were included. This was also the first time that out of town dignitaries and politicians attended. The highlight of that year's show was the performance by the black cowboy Jesse Stahl. He competed in bronc riding twice, once facing forward, the other time facing backwards. Jesse Stahl retired in 1929 and was probably the most well-known black cowboy in history. The total attendance to the 1912 show was 4,000.

The trotting races where zoned out by 1913 and the eleven leaders of the show started trying to make the show a permanent feature. Frank Griffin became the President and Rodeo Boss, which he held until 1934. The program was extended to include over 20 events and the evening parade was formalized. It was given the name "El Colmado del Rodeo" and was sometimes called the "Colmo del Rodeo". It was eliminated in 1985, but not before it achieved the status of the largest night parade west of the Mississippi. In 1930, a parade for children only was instituted, called the Kiddie Kapers Parade, which continues today. The Colmo del Rodeo was re-instituted in 2010, and is preceded by the Kiddie Kapers Parade.

In 1914, the show was incorporated under the name "California Rodeo." The war did not stop the rodeo in the years 1917 and 1918. In 1923, the rodeo paid the City of Salinas $40,000 in order to get a Quitclaim deed to the location from the Sherwood heirs. The title cleared in 1924, and the rodeo was reincorporated as "California Rodeo, Inc." A municipal bond issue in the amount of $40,000 was passed that year. It was used to build an 8,000 seat grandstand, a ½ mile racetrack, two barns, fences, and bucking chutes. It was paid off in 1944 from revenue made by the rodeo and the City of Salinas didn't make any money off of it.

The first "Queen of the Rodeo" contest was in 1926. It was won by Miss Bernice Donahue. By 1929, the contest had evolved into the "Sweetheart of the Rodeo" contest. This was won by Miss Lilian Kirschner of Santa Clara County. Also in this time, Abe Lefcowitz, a former clown in the rodeo, became the official announcer. He became known as Abe Lefton, and was the announcer from 1928 until 1950. His comical thoughts about dignitaries, politics, and the sport were loved by the fans. By 1929, the local cowboys were becoming outnumbered by out of town professionals. But this was not due to lack of support from the locals — the parade, which WAS mostly of locals, was over a mile long! Also, in that year, the Rodeo Cowboys Association was formed. In 1936, it became the Cowboy Turtle Association, before becoming the PRCA (Professional Rodeo Cowboys Association). In 1994, the rule was passed that all competitors had to be registered with the PRCA.

=== 1935 to present ===
In 1935, the grandstands were enlarged to hold 14,000 people. Brahman bulls were used for the first time in 1939 in the bull riding contest. This was more exciting, because these bulls' behavior was less predictable than that of other bulls. Between the years 1924 and 1942, many improvements were made to the facilities. The list included: enlarging the grandstands, building new barns, corrals and fences. Around 3,600 Japanese Americans were interned on the rodeo grounds as the Salinas Assembly Center during World War II, from April to July 1942. In July 1942 till 1945 it was used by the US Army VII Corps (United States) as the Salinas Garrison. In 1947, the rodeo purchased 30 acres (120,000 m^{2}) of land to the east of the grounds from Mrs. Emma Sterling. The Rodeo deeded this land to the City. In 1972, the Rodeo purchased 14.5 acres (59,000 m^{2}) and also deeded it to the city. The City and the Rodeo then signed a 15-year lease that expired on Jun 30, 1999. In 1996, the grandstands were demolished and were replaced by new ones after the July rodeo. It was replaced by an 8.5 million dollar multi-use sports facility.

In 1971, team ropers Jim Olds of San Juan Bautista, California and local Bill Armour of Salinas, California set not only a time record but they also set a record to become the first High Money Winners of the California Rodeo Salinas to do so in a single event. Previously the title of "High Money Winner" had always been won by the All Around Champion, winning prize money in two or more events. Olds and Armour won 1st place in the first go-round, 2nd place in the 3rd go-round and 1st place in the average leading to a contentious debate over who would be presented with the San Francisco Chronicle Award, normally given to the "high money winner". After days of debate, the rodeo committee determined the award would be presented to the All Around Champion Jim Rodriguez Jr. instead of the High Money Winners, Jim Olds and Bill Armour. The rules would be changed thereafter to state that the award would go to the All-Around Champion.

In 1979, the California Rodeo Historical Committee was formed and given the gifts of an authentic Wells Fargo stagecoach and a building. Barbara Breen and Marge Behen were the first co-chairmen of the museum that was established. The museum is open to the public during the run of the Rodeo or by appointment.

Today, the California Rodeo Salinas is the largest and most popular rodeo in California. It is one of the top PRCA rodeos televised on The Cowboy Channel and live-streamed on The Cowboy Channel Plus application.

The 2020 edition of the California Rodeo Salinas was rescheduled from its usual July run to October because of the COVID-19 pandemic. However, after several months, the event was cancelled altogether.

The PRCA's ProRodeo Tour Finale in September moved to the California Rodeo Salinas in 2021 from its previous home at the Washington State Fair in Puyallup, Washington.

The Professional Bull Riders (PBR) hosted an event during the California Rodeo Salinas for several years. However, since 2022, the all-bull riding event at the rodeo is a PRCA Xtreme Bulls tour stop. Also in 2022, the PRCA's ProRodeo Tour was renamed as the Playoff Series. The California Rodeo Salinas returned to its usual July run and is a regular season stop on said tour, while the tour's finale returned to Puyallup, Washington in September. However, as of 2023, the Playoff Series finale now takes place in Sioux Falls, South Dakota.

Other events have appeared there including monster truck shows, and a famous publicity stunt happened on May 31, 1992, at a show promoted by the late Dave Matthews where a stipulation was added to qualifying stating that the slowest qualifying truck would be dropped from a crane. Mike Welch, famous monster truck driver built a truck called Muscle Beach with no front suspension and a regular car engine specifically for the drop and purposely finished last, and the truck was hoisted and fell 100 ft from the crane, and fell apart as part of the gimmick.
