= Carl Nicks (American football) =

American football player (born 1985)

No. 77
- Position: Guard

Personal information
- Born: May 14, 1985 (age 41); San Francisco, California, U.S.
- Listed height: 6 ft 5 in (1.96 m)
- Listed weight: 343 lb (156 kg)

Career information
- High school: North Salinas (Salinas, California)
- College: New Mexico State (2003–2004); Hartnell JC (2005); Nebraska (2006–2007)
- NFL draft: 2008: 5th round, 164th overall pick

Career history
- New Orleans Saints (2008–2011); Tampa Bay Buccaneers (2012–2013)

Awards and highlights
- Super Bowl champion (XLIV); First-team All-Pro (2011); Second-team All-Pro (2010); 2× Pro Bowl (2010, 2011); PFWA All-Rookie Team (2008); Madden Most Valuable Protectors Award (2009); New Orleans Saints Hall of Fame; First-team CCC All-American (2005)

Career NFL statistics
- Games played: 73
- Games started: 70
- Stats at Pro Football Reference

Carl Ray Nicks, Jr. (born May 14, 1985) is an American former professional football player who was a guard in the National Football League (NFL) for six seasons. He played college football for the Nebraska Cornhuskers, and was selected by the New Orleans Saints in the fifth round of the 2008 NFL draft. He also played for the Tampa Bay Buccaneers.

== College career ==
Nicks graduated from North Salinas High School in Salinas, California in 2003. Before transferring to Nebraska, Nicks played at New Mexico State and then at Hartnell College, a community college in Salinas. Following the 2005 season at Hartnell, Nicks was rated the No. 7 junior college prospect from the state of California by JCGridiron.com. During his time at Nebraska, Nicks was known for his problems on and off the field, but in 2010, Nicks returned to Lincoln to apologize to head coach Bo Pelini for his behavior during his time at Nebraska.

== Professional career ==
Pre-draft measurables
| Height | Weight | Arm length | Hand span | 40-yard dash | 10-yard split | 20-yard split | 20-yard shuttle | Three-cone drill | Vertical jump | Broad jump | Bench press |
|---|---|---|---|---|---|---|---|---|---|---|---|
| 6 ft 4 7/8 in (1.95 m) | 341 lb (155 kg) | 34 3/4 in (0.88 m) | 10 in (0.25 m) | 5.22 s | 1.80 s | 2.98 s | 4.68 s | 7.91 s | 25.5 in (0.65 m) | 9 ft 1 in (2.77 m) | 31 reps |
All values from NFL Combine

=== New Orleans Saints ===
In his rookie season, he replaced Jamar Nesbit in the starting lineup after Nesbit violated the league substance abuse policy. His play exceeded expectations and Nicks finished his rookie year playing in all 16 games and starting 13. After starting all 16 games in 2009 and the Saints three post-season games, he went into the 2010 season as the starting left guard. He was named to the Pro Bowl in 2010 and 2011 and was a first-team All-Pro selection in 2011. He was ranked 55th by his fellow players on the NFL Top 100 Players of 2011.

Nicks gave a profanity-laced radio interview after the Saints win in Super Bowl XLIV in which he excitedly shouted "I'm going to mother-fucking Disneyland!" as the Saints left the field after winning the game.

=== Tampa Bay Buccaneers ===
Nicks signed a five-year, $47.5 million contract with the Tampa Bay Buccaneers on March 14, 2012. On October 30, Nicks was placed on injured reserve with a toe problem requiring surgery. He had not missed a game since joining the NFL.

Before the season began in 2013, Nicks and kicker Lawrence Tynes were diagnosed with methicillin-resistant Staphylococcus aureus, causing him to miss week one of the season.

On July 25, 2014, the Buccaneers and Nicks mutually agreed to part ways, ending his tenure with the team. After signing as an unrestricted free agent during the 2012 offseason, Nicks played in nine games for the Buccaneers over the past two seasons.

Health issues, including a methicillin-resistant Staphylococcus aureus infection, forced his early retirement. He was inducted into the New Orleans Saints Hall of Fame on October 29, 2017.
