= John Steinbeck Library =

Coordinates: 36.672°N 121.65727°W

The John Steinbeck Library is a public library in Salinas, California, United States. The library was named after writer John Steinbeck in 1969. The library held the Steinbeck archives until 1998 when they were transferred to the new National Steinbeck Center. The library made national headlines in 2004 and 2005 when it, along with the two other libraries in Salinas, were on the verge of closing because of insufficient funding. In 2005, a nationally covered read-in drew citizens as well as authors to the library to raise awareness about the potential closure. This national publicity, as well as private funding, saved the library. Had the libraries closed, Salinas would have been the largest city in the United States without a library.
