= Kassim Osgood =

American football player (born 1980)

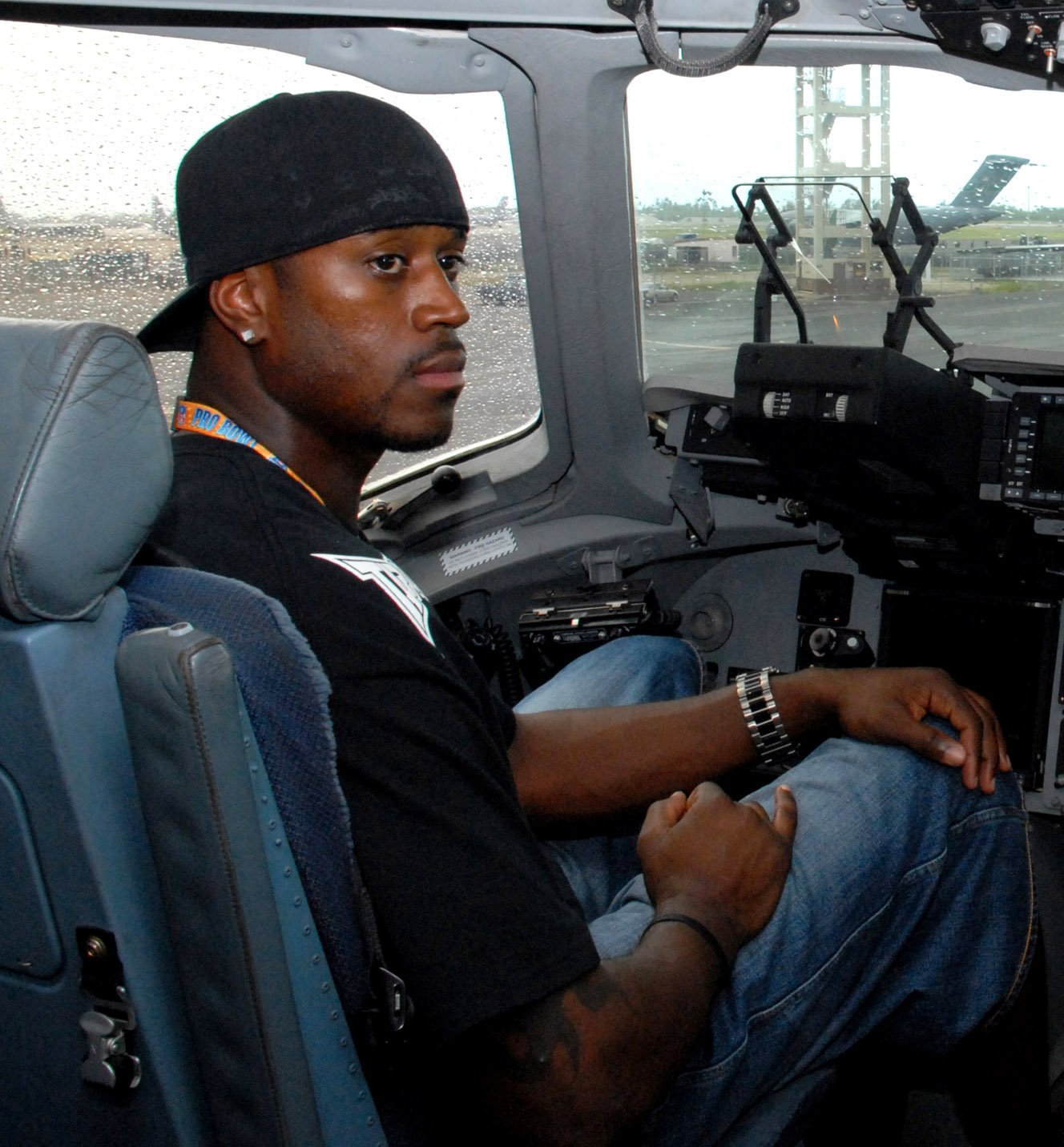
- Osgood in 2008

No. 81, 10, 14
- Position: Wide receiver / Special teamer

Personal information
- Born: May 20, 1980 (age 46); Boston, Massachusetts, U.S.
- Listed height: 6 ft 5 in (1.96 m)
- Listed weight: 220 lb (100 kg)

Career information
- High school: North Salinas (Salinas, California)
- College: San Diego State
- NFL draft: 2003: undrafted

Career history
- San Diego Chargers (2003–2009); Jacksonville Jaguars (2010–2011); Detroit Lions (2012); San Francisco 49ers (2013–2014)

Awards and highlights
- First-team All-Pro (2007); 3× Pro Bowl (2006, 2007, 2009); San Diego Chargers 50th Anniversary Team; First-team All-MW (2002)

Career NFL statistics
- Receptions: 45
- Receiving yards: 766
- Receiving touchdowns: 5
- Stats at Pro Football Reference

Kassim Alexandre Osgood (/kəˈsiːm/; born May 20, 1980) is an American former professional football player who was a wide receiver and special teamer in the National Football League (NFL). He played college football for San Diego State University and Cal Poly, and was signed by the San Diego Chargers as an undrafted free agent in 2003. He also played for the San Diego Chargers, Jacksonville Jaguars, Detroit Lions, and San Francisco 49ers.

== Early life ==
Osgood was born in Boston, Massachusetts and grew up in Salinas, California, where he graduated from North Salinas High School.

== College career ==
Osgood spent three years at FCS Cal Poly. In his sophomore year, Osgood led the nation in receiving yards, ranked second in receiving yards per game (125.2), and sixth in catches per game (7.6). That year, he set an NCAA Division I-AA record with 376 yards receiving in a game against Northern Iowa and set school records for both touchdowns in a season (14) and catches in a game (17).

Prior to the 2001–02 college football season, Osgood transferred to San Diego State University where he would be named first-team All-Mountain West Conference. In that year he ranked second in the nation in catches (108) and fourth in nation in yards per game (119.4). He and teammate J. R. Tolver combined to set NCAA records for receiving yards in a season by teammates with 3,337 yards and catches with 236. Kassim earned his degree in sociology from San Diego State.

== Professional career ==
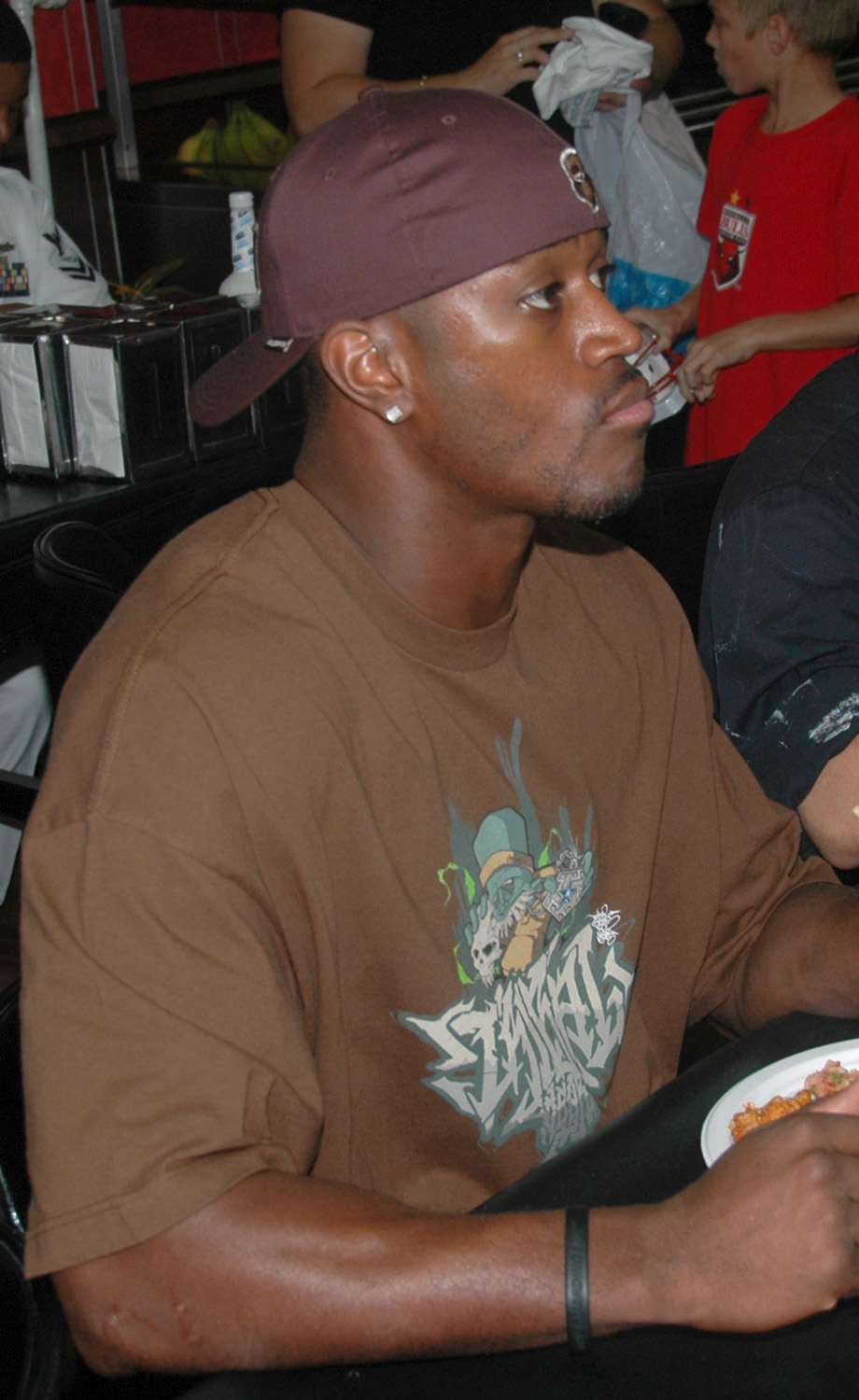
Osgood in 2008

=== San Diego Chargers ===
Osgood was signed by the San Diego Chargers as an undrafted free agent ahead of the 2003 NFL season. He saw some playing time in his first two seasons with the team, appearing in all 16 games and catching two touchdown passes each season.

Prior to the 2006 season, he signed a four-year extension. That year, he expressed frustration with his limited role.

Osgood was named to the Pro Bowl in 2007, 2008, and 2010 as the designated special teams player for his conference.

=== Jacksonville Jaguars ===
On March 6, 2010, Osgood signed with the Jacksonville Jaguars to a three-year, $6.675 million contract, with a $2.2 million signing bonus. He was released on March 13, 2012.

=== Detroit Lions ===
The Detroit Lions signed Osgood on August 22, 2012.

=== San Francisco 49ers ===
The San Francisco 49ers signed Osgood on June 4, 2013, but he did not make the regular season roster. He was re-signed on September 11, 2013.

Osgood signed a one-year contract with the 49ers on March 17, 2014. The 49ers released him on August 30, 2014, as part of final roster cuts. On September 2, 2014, the 49ers re-signed Osgood to a one-year contract and released him four days later. He was again re-signed on September 8 when LaMichael James was cut and was released on October 8 to make room for the signing of safety Bubba Ventrone. Then on October 10, the 49ers cut quarterback Josh Johnson to make room for Osgood again. Osgood was placed on injured reserve after suffering a broken hand injury during a 17–7 loss to the Seattle Seahawks.
