= Marie D. Kassing =

American activist

Marie D. Kassing is one of the founders of the Women's Crisis Center in Salinas, California, a founder of the National Organization for Women in Monterey, CA, a founder of Pueblo Del Mar in Marina, CA, and has won the 1995 Outstanding Woman Honoree award in Monterey County, California. She is the retired Deputy Director of Sun Street Centers, Salinas, CA.

Kassing was born on the Monterey Peninsula in California and has lived her life in Monterey County.
