= San Benancio, California =

Unincorporated community in California, United States

San Benancio
- Unincorporated community
- Location in California
- Coordinates: 36°34′10″N 121°42′31″W
- Country: United States
- State: California
- County: Monterey
- Established: 1834
- Elevation: 226 ft (69 m)

San Benancio is an unincorporated community in Monterey County, California, United States. It is located in the San Benancio Canyon.

== History and etymology ==
The region was named for San Benancio Gulch which is the small canyon that forms the majority of the region. A map dated 1834 lists the region as "Canada de San Benancio". The Spanish name most likely refers to one of four saints venerated with the name Venantius.

San Benancio was the inspiration for "Las Pasturas del Cielo," the fictional setting in John Steinbeck’s Pastures of Heaven. A Salinas native, Steinbeck spent time in his youth within San Benancio, specifically Castle Rock near the base of the Canyon, and accurately described the region in Pastures of Heaven:

... he saw a long valley floored with green pasturage on which a herd of deer browsed. Perfect live oaks in the meadow of the lovely place, and the hills hugged it jealously against the fog and wind.

== Geography and climate ==
While it has no official boundaries, the colloquial place-name "San Benancio" refers to homes and businesses residing on or directly reached by San Benancio Road. This includes the Ambler Park and Harper Canyon regions found along the road.

The road itself is located along the Monterey-Salinas highway (California State Route 68) roughly equidistant from Salinas and Monterey.

The walls of San Benancio Canyon have an elevation of 400 ft and run adjacent to Toro Creek, a small tributary to the Salinas River which is located four miles south. The canyon is home to a number of California Live Oak Trees and various types of wild sage brush and grass.

The canyon is home to a wide array of wildlife as well including deer, hawks, condors, wild pigs, California quail and a large population of wild turkeys.

== Government ==
At the county level, San Benancio is represented on the Monterey County Board of Supervisors by Supervisor Dave Potter.

In the California State Senate, San Benancio is in the 17th senatorial district, represented by Democrat John Laird. In the California State Assembly, it is split between the 29th Assembly district, represented by Democrat Robert Rivas, and the 30th Assembly district, represented by Democrat Dawn Addis.

In the United States House of Representatives, San Benancio is in California's 19th congressional district, represented by Democrat Jimmy Panetta.

== Education and recreation ==
San Benancio is served by the Washington Union School District. San Benancio Middle School which serves over 300 students in the sixth through eighth grade, is located in San Benancio. The school was rated 9 out of 10 by the "Great Schools" website in 2007.

The region is also served by Titus Park, a private swim and tennis club located along San Benancio Road. The pool remains open daily from June to September and hours are dictated by weather.
