= Kiddie Kapers Parade =

Annual evening parade in Salinas, California

Kiddie Kapers Parade is a Salinas, California based evening parade held annually since 1930. It is notable as the participants are limited to children. It is held in conjunction with “Big Week” which includes the California Rodeo Salinas, and it usually precedes the Colmo del Rodeo night parade, as well as daily horse parades down Main Street. Children don costumes, ride decorated bicycles, appear as the Jolly Green Giant, or otherwise explore their creativity, with a theme for each year, and various divisions. As many as four generations of the family have participated in the parade. The parade is referenced in numerous books. The parade is nowadays referenced in the California Rodeo Salinas website.

== History ==
In 1911, the Salinas Rodeo, then known as the Wild West Show, was held at the Sherwood Park at the race track. It lasted a week, thus the name, "Big Week". During this era, the Colmo del Rodeo night parade began.

In 1930, the Salinas Exchange Club promoted the first Kiddie Kapers Parade as part of the Colmo del Rodeo on Saturday night. In 1931, the Kiddie Kapers Parade was changed to the night before the opening of the Salinas Rodeo, which is its current configuration.

There was no parade from 1942 to 1945 nor 2020.

The parade is unique in that only children are allowed to participate, and every child wins a prize, including at least a $1 bill. Approximately 1200 children participate annually. Each year has a theme for the children. In 2017, the theme was Kids Just Wanna Have Fun. Approximately 30,000 people viewed the parade in 2013.
