= Washington Union School District =

School district in California, United States

Address
- 43 San Benancio Road Salinas, California, 93908; United States

District information
- Type: Public
- Grades: K–8
- NCES District ID: 0641610

Students and staff
- Students: 791
- Teachers: 35.0
- Staff: 26.44
- Student–teacher ratio: 22.6

Other information
- Website: www.washingtonusd.org

The Washington Union School District is a school district outside Salinas, California. It was established in 1869. Its middle school, San Benancio Middle School, is one of the few public schools in California to receive a GreatSchools Rating of 9 out of 10.

The district consists of three schools; K–3 Toro Park Elementary School, 4–5 Washington Union Elementary School, and 6–8 San Benancio Middle School.

Washington Union School has an extensive nature trail running through the hills behind the school. Trail maintenance and improvements are mostly performed by the students.

Toro Park School (named for the residential development it serves, adjacent to the former Fort Ord Military Base) was built in the late 1970s and was originally for children with disabilities. At that time, San Benancio School housed kindergarten to 3rd grades and 7th to 8th grades; and Washington Union was home to 4th to 6th grades.

Now the A.B. Ingham School, adjacent to San Benancio School, educates Monterey County's students with disabilities. Toro Park School still has the Toro School for the Deaf and Hard of Hearing, and incorporates special programs for those with mental or physical disabilities as well.

The district includes a small portion of Carmel Valley Village.
