= Alisal Union School District =

School district in California, United States

Alisal Union Elementary School District

Location
- 155 Bardin Rd. Salinas, California 93905 United States

Other information
- Website: www.alisal.org

Alisal Union Elementary School District is a public school district based in Monterey County, California, United States.

The Alisal Union Elementary School District has 12 schools in Salinas, California.

- Alisal Community School, 1437 Del Monte Avenue
- Bardin Elementary School, 425 Bardin Road
- Cesar E. Chavez Elementary School, 1225 Towt Street
- Creekside Elementary School, 1770 Kittery Street
- Dr. Oscar F. Loya Elementary School, 1505 Cougar Drive
- Frank Paul Elementary School, 1300 Rider Avenue
- Fremont Elementary School, 1255 East Market Street
- Jesse G. Sanchez School, 901 N. Sanborn Road
- John E. Steinbeck Elementary School, 1714 Burlington Drive
- Martin Luther King Jr. Academy, 925 North Sanborn Road
- Monte Bella Elementary School, 1300 Tuscany Blvd
- Virginia Rocca Barton School, 680 Las Casitas Drive

In June 1937, bids were made at the office of the architect for the school, C. J. Ryland, to build four new classrooms and a teachers' room for the Alisal Union Elementary School building. The work was completed by November 1937.
