= Calvin Harrison =

American sprinter (born 1974)

Personal information
- Born: January 20, 1974 (age 52) Orlando, Florida, U.S.
- Height: 6 ft 2 in (1.88 m)
- Weight: 155 lb (70 kg)

Sport
- Sport: Running
- Event: Sprints
Medal record
Men's athletics
Representing the United States
Olympic Games
Disqualified	2000 Sydney	4×400 m relay
World Championships
Disqualified	2003 Paris	4×400 m relay
- Updated on 3 May 2012

Calvin Harrison (born January 20, 1974) is an American athlete. He won a gold medal in the men's 4 × 400 metres relay at the 2000 Summer Olympics in Sydney, Australia. He is the identical twin brother of fellow Olympic medalist Alvin Harrison. At the 2000 Olympics, Alvin Harrison and Calvin Harrison made history by becoming the first twins ever to compete and win Olympic gold medals together on the same relay team since the inception of the modern Olympic Games. In the 4 × 400 m relay, Alvin ran the first leg and Calvin ran the third leg. In 2008, the 2000 Sydney Olympics 4×400 metres relay US team was stripped of their medals after teammate Antonio Pettigrew admitted that he had used performance-enhancing drugs.

Calvin Harrison did not participate in the 2004 Summer Olympics due to a stimulant violation involving modafinil at the 2003 U.S. championships. Harrison received a two-year suspension that ended in 2006.

While Alvin won an individual silver medal at the Olympics, when the twins were in high school at North Salinas High School, in Salinas, California, Calvin was the star. He set the NFHS National High School record in the 400 meters of 45.25, while winning the 1993 CIF California State Meet defeating Michael Granville, the soon-to-be national 800 meter record holder in the process. The record stood until Aldrich Bailey broke it in 2012. In 1993, Calvin also won the 200 meters and teamed with Alvin to win the 4×400 meter relay, plus third place in the 4×100 meter relay, leading North Salinas to tie for the team title—the only time the school has even been in contention. He was Track and Field News "High School Athlete of the Year" in 1993.

Due to family problems, Alvin and Calvin Harrison lived on their own since their junior year in high school, floating back and forth between Orlando, Florida, and Salinas, California. After graduation, Calvin Harrison attended two-year Hartnell College, but did not compete in track. Harrison also co-authored the book Go to Your Destiny, which debuted on The Oprah Winfrey Show in 2001.

== See also ==
- List of doping cases in athletics

Awards
Preceded by Jeff Buckey	Track & Field News High School Boys Athlete of the Year; 1993	Succeeded by Andre Scott
