= Alvin Harrison =

American track and field athlete (born 1974)

Personal information
- Full name: Alvin Leonardo Harrison
- Born: January 20, 1974 (age 52) Orlando, Florida, U.S.
- Height: 6 ft 2 in (188 cm)
- Weight: 176 lb (80 kg)

Achievements and titles
- Personal best: 400 m: 44.09 (Atlanta 1996)
Medal record
Men's athletics
Representing the United States
Olympic Games
Gold medal – first place	1996 Atlanta	4 × 400 m relay
Silver medal – second place	2000 Sydney	400 m
Disqualified	2000 Sydney	4 × 400 m relay (Note: Teammate Antonio Pettigrew later admitted to using performance-enhancing drugs and the International Olympic Committee disqualified the team.)

Alvin Leonardo Harrison (born January 20, 1974) is an American former track and field athlete who competed in sprinting events. He won a gold medal in the 4 × 400 metres relay at both the 1996 and 2000 Summer Olympics and a silver medal in the 400 metres at the 2000 Summer Olympics.

== Biography ==
Born in Orlando, Florida, Harrison is the twin brother of fellow Olympic medalist Calvin Harrison. A year before their first attempt to make the Olympic team, the twins were living in their Ford Mustang. While Calvin was the star in high school, setting the National High School Record in the 400 meters, it was Alvin who earned the first Olympic spot in 1996 at the 1996 Olympic Trials. While he made the finals in the individual 400 meters, he drew lane one and finished fourth behind Michael Johnson's gold medal performance. But Johnson injured himself setting the world record in the 200 meters. Without their gold medalist and also without world record holder Butch Reynolds, the American team looked vulnerable in the 4 × 400 meters relay. The British team looked to take advantage by going out hard in the lead, however as the second leg of the team, Alvin over took Jamie Baulch on the home stretch to put USA into the lead, a lead they ultimately would not relinquish, giving Alvin a gold medal.

At the 2000 Summer Olympics, Alvin Harrison and Calvin Harrison made history by becoming the first twins ever to compete and win Olympic gold medals together on the same relay team since the inception of the modern Olympic Games. In the 4 × 400 m relay, Alvin ran the first leg and Calvin ran the third leg. Harrison also authored the book Go to Your Destiny, which debuted on The Oprah Winfrey Show in 2001. Alvin Harrison was featured in the United Way of America public service announcement "Performance" commercial.

Alvin Harrison did not compete in the 2004 Olympics due to circumstantial evidence of using a banned substance. In October 2004, he agreed to a four-year suspension with the U.S. Anti-Doping Agency. In 2008, the 2000 Sydney Olympics 4 × 400 metres relay US team was stripped of their medals after team member Antonio Pettigrew admitted that he had used performance-enhancing drugs.

After his suspension expired in late 2008, Harrison enjoyed a late career renaissance via a transfer of allegiance to the Dominican Republic in 2008. He made the move following discussion with his wife and his track colleague Félix Sánchez, both of whom are Dominican. He competed for his new country at the 2009 World Championships in Athletics, running in the heats of the 400 m race. He made his second world appearance soon after and helped the Dominican 4 × 400-meter relay team to fourth place at the 2010 IAAF World Indoor Championships. The Athletics Federation of the Dominican Republic chose Harrison as inaugural head of its high performance Olympic development program, whose first success was Luguelín Santos, silver medalist in the 2012 Olympic 400 metres at age 18. Harrison's role was recognised with an honorary master's degree in exercise science. He has also worked in high-performance programs in the NFL and NBA.

Harrison has one son and three daughters.

== Personal bests ==
Event	Time	Date	Venue
200 m	20.23	March 28, 1996	Fresno, California
400 m	44.09	June 19, 1996	Atlanta, Georgia

== International competitions ==
Year	Competition	Venue	Position	Event	Notes
1996	1996 Summer Olympics	Atlanta, United States	1st	4 × 400 m Relay	
2000	2000 Olympic Games	Sydney, Australia	2nd	400 m	

=== Track records ===
As of 7 September 2024, Harrison holds the following track records for 400 metres.

Location	Time	Date
Brisbane	44.18	08/09/2000
Cape Town	44.94	20/03/1998
Roodepoort	44.26	16/03/1998

== See also ==
- List of doping cases in athletics
