= List of Chapman University alumni =

Following is a list of notable alumni of Chapman University.

== Arts ==
- John Sexton – fine art photographer

== Business ==
- Tiquette Bramlett – winemaker and founder of the nonprofit organization Our Legacy Harvested
- Noelle Freeman – entrepreneur and founder of the DMS Agency
- Cooper Hefner (2015) – chief creative officer and chief of global partnerships of Playboy Enterprises
- Jeff Lewis (1993) – real estate speculator, interior designer, and television personality on Flipping Out
- Tilden Smith (2012) – co-founder of a pet product company, International Pet Solutions

== Education ==
- Silas Bartsch – school administrator and superintendent of the Kings Canyon Unified School District
- Vicky M. Wilkins (MS) – public administration scholar, academic administrator, and acting provost of American University

== Entertainment ==
=== Film and television ===
- Anastasia Baranova – film and television actress
- Ryan Bergara – creator of documentary entertainment web series BuzzFeed Unsolved
- Henry Blair – film, television and radio actor
- Mark Brandon – film and television actor
- Jason Michael Brescia – film director
- Samantha Brown (non-degreed) – television host, notable for her work as the host of several Travel Channel shows
- Chris Burrous – television journalist and news anchor
- Jake Cherry – film actor
- Erika Cohn – Emmy and Peabody-winning film producer and director
- Dime Davis (2008) – director and producer
- Madison De La Garza – actress and filmmaker
- DJ Dodd (MFA 2012) - film and television producer
- Derek Doneen (2009) – documentary director, producer and editor known for The Price of Free, Heist, Dancing for the Devil: The 7M TikTok Cult
- Matt Duffer (2007) – film and television writer, director, producer, and co-creator of Stranger Things
- Ross Duffer (2007) – film and television writer, director, and producer
- Hannah Einbinder (2017) (BFA) – stand-up comedian and actor, known for Hacks
- Bob Einstein – film and television actor
- Parker Finn – filmmaker, known for Smile and Smile 2
- Zachary Gordon – actor, singer and songwriter
- Colin Hanks (non-degreed, left in 1997) – film and television actor
- Ben York Jones (2006) – screenwriter and actor, co-creator of the television series Everything Sucks!
- Leslie Jones (non-degreed, left in 1986) – comedian, former Saturday Night Live cast member
- Tyler Patrick Jones – actor
- Harshvardhan Kapoor – Bollywood actor
- Sanyukta Kaza (MFA) – film editor
- Paul Le Mat (1963) – movie actor
- Matthew Lessner (2005) – independent filmmaker
- Jeff Lewis (1993) – real estate speculator, interior designer, and television personality on Flipping Out
- Eric Lloyd – actor best known for work as a child actor; Charlie Calvin in Disney's The Santa Clause film trilogy
- Carlos López Estrada – filmmaker, producer, and actor, known for Blindspotting, Summertime, Raya and the Last Dragon, and Didi
- Kellan Lutz – fashion model and actor
- Kelley Mack – actress
- Michael Mohan – film director and writer
- Cecil Moller (MA 2010) – film director and producer
- Linh Nga (MFA) – film director, film producer, actress, and screenwriter
- Olatunde Osunsanmi (MFA) – film and television director
- Owen Painter (2020) – actor, best known for his role as Isaac Night / Slurp in the Netflix series Wednesday
- Malea Rose (BFA) – actress, writer, and producer
- Utkarsh Sharma (BFA) – Indian actor
- Justin Simien (2005) – filmmaker, actor, and author; director of Dear White People
- Roger Craig Smith (2003) – voice actor
- Joan Staley (non-degreed) – model and actress
- Jodie Sweetin (2005) – actress, star of television series Full House and Fuller House
- James Sweeney – filmmaker, actor; director of Twinless
- Carles Torrens (BFA 2008) – film director
- Josie Totah – actress, writer and producer
- H. Nelson Tracey (BFA) - filmmaker; director of Breakup Season
- Ariel Tweto – cast member of the documentary television series Flying Wild Alaska that aired on Discovery Channel
- Aspen Vincent (non-degreed) – voice actress, Broadway actress, and singer
- Michael Vlamis – actor and screenwriter
- Jason Wise – filmmaker known for his wine documentaries

=== Music ===
- Kit Armstrong – classical pianist, composer, organist, and former child prodigy
- Stephen "tWitch" Boss – DJ and dancer
- Kalena Bovell (2009) – conductor of the Memphis Symphony Orchestra
- Carolyn Waters Broe – conductor, composer, and violist who founded Four Seasons Orchestra
- Sabrina Bryan – dancer, choreographer, actress, singer, and member of The Cheetah Girls
- Grant Gershon (non-degreed) – Grammy Award-winning American conductor and pianist and artistic director of the Los Angeles Master Chorale
- King Henry – record producer and DJ
- Kevin Kwan Loucks (EMBA 2017) – CEO of Chamber Music America and member of classical music ensemble Trio Célest
- Marty Paich – pianist, composer, arranger, record producer, music director, and conductor
- Stacey Tappan (1995) – opera singer
- Jason Thornberry (MFA) – magazine writer and musician with the Southern California alternative-punk group Mulch
- Deborah Voigt – opera singer
- Wimberley Bluegrass Band – all four siblings graduated on the same weekend

== Law ==
- John C. Yoder – judge of 23rd Circuit Court of West Virginia and West Virginia Senate

== Literature and journalism ==
- Gustavo Arellano ('01) – former publisher and editor of OC Weekly and author of the column ¡Ask a Mexican!
- Amy Sterling Casil (1999 MFA) – science fiction writer and writing instructor at Chapman University
- Peter Germano (1959) – author of short stories, novels, and television scripts
- Jason Thornberry (MFA) – magazine writer and musician with the Southern California alternative-punk group Mulch

== Military ==
- Nina Armagno (MA 1999) – United States Space Force lieutenant general, first director of staff of the United States Space Force
- Rick Francona – commentator and media military analyst for NBC and CNN, retired United States Air Force intelligence officer
- Keith M. Givens (MS) – United States Air Force brigadier general
- Wayne W. Lambert (MBA 1976) – United States Air Force brigadier general
- Eldon Regua (MBA) – United States Army Reserve major general
- Donna D. Shipton (1995 MBA) – United States Air Force lieutenant general and military deputy to the Assistant Secretary of the Air Force for Acquisition, Technology and Logistics
- Laura Yeager – U.S. Army general, first woman to command an Army infantry division

== Politics ==
- Paul Anderson – Nevada State Assembly
- George Argyros (1959) – U.S. Ambassador to Spain and former owner of Seattle Mariners of Major League Baseball
- Melissa Argyros (2007) – U.S. Ambassador to Latvia
- David E. Bonior (MA 1972) – United States House of Representatives from Michigan (1977–2003), House minority whip (1995–2002), House majority whip (1991–95)
- Sean Elo-Rivera (2009) – president of the San Diego City Council
- Bill Essayli (JD) – California State Assembly
- Chris Lee (MBA19'97) – United States House of Representatives 2009–2011
- Gustavo Leite (non-degreed) – Minister of Industry and Commerce of Paraguay and Planning Minister of Paraguay
- Mark Miloscia (MA) – Washington State Senate and Washington House of Representatives
- Joanna Rosholm (2007) – press secretary to First Lady Michelle Obama
- Loretta Sanchez (1982) – United States House of Representatives
- Rob Schneiderman (MA) – United States House of Representatives
- Mark R. Shepherd – political consultant, strategist, activist, environmentalist, and radio personality
- Jim Silva (MA) – California State Assembly
- Jim Byron - Former NARA director, President of Richard Nixon library foundation
- John C. Yoder – West Virginia Senate and judge of 23rd Circuit Court of West Virginia

== Religion ==
- Rita Nakashima Brock (1972) – Protestant theologian, feminist scholar, and a commissioned minister in the Christian Church (Disciples of Christ)
- Paul H. Dunn (1953) – general authority of the Church of Jesus Christ of Latter-day Saints
- James M. Stanton – sixth bishop of the Episcopal Diocese of Dallas

== Sports ==
- Emmett Ashford (1941) – first African-American umpire in Major League Baseball
- Don August – professional baseball player
- Jeff Carnazzo (MEd) – high school teacher and football coach
- Marty Castillo – professional baseball player
- Matt Dinerman – Thoroughbred horse racing announcer
- Tim Flannery (1979) – Major League Baseball player for eleven seasons and coach for San Francisco Giants
- Beccy Gordon – swimsuit model, member of the United States women's national softball team, off-road racer, and pit-reporter
- Brian Green – college baseball coach
- Randy Jones – former professional baseball player, San Diego Padres, New York Mets; 1976 Cy Young Award winner
- Steve Lavin – former head coach of St. John's men's basketball team (2010–2015), former head coach of UCLA men's basketball team (1996–2002)
- Jeff Levering (2003) – Milwaukee Brewers play-by-play announcer
- Gary Lucas – professional baseball player
- Eric Marty – professional football player and coach
- Stephen Nelson (2011) – Los Angeles Dodgers play-by-play announcer. Former MLB/NHL television personality, co-host of Intentional Talk, and play-by-play announcer for the MLB Network-produced Friday Night Baseball on Apple TV+
- Jay Pettibone – professional baseball player
- Brent Poppen – paralympic sportsman, advocate, author, and teacher
- Jim Saia – college basketball head coach
- Eddie Soto (non-degreed) – professional soccer player
- Kelli Stavast (2002) – sportscaster who formerly worked for NBC Sports as a pit reporter
- Paul Swingle – professional baseball player
- Bill Trumbo (1961) – college basketball coach and athletic director
- Miles Walker – professional tennis player
- Paul Wekesa – professional tennis player
- John Young – professional baseball player
- Octavio Zambrano – professional soccer player and coach
- Kate Ziegler – 2012 Summer Olympics competitor and swimmer who specializes in freestyle and long-distance
