= Jeff Carnazzo =

American football coach

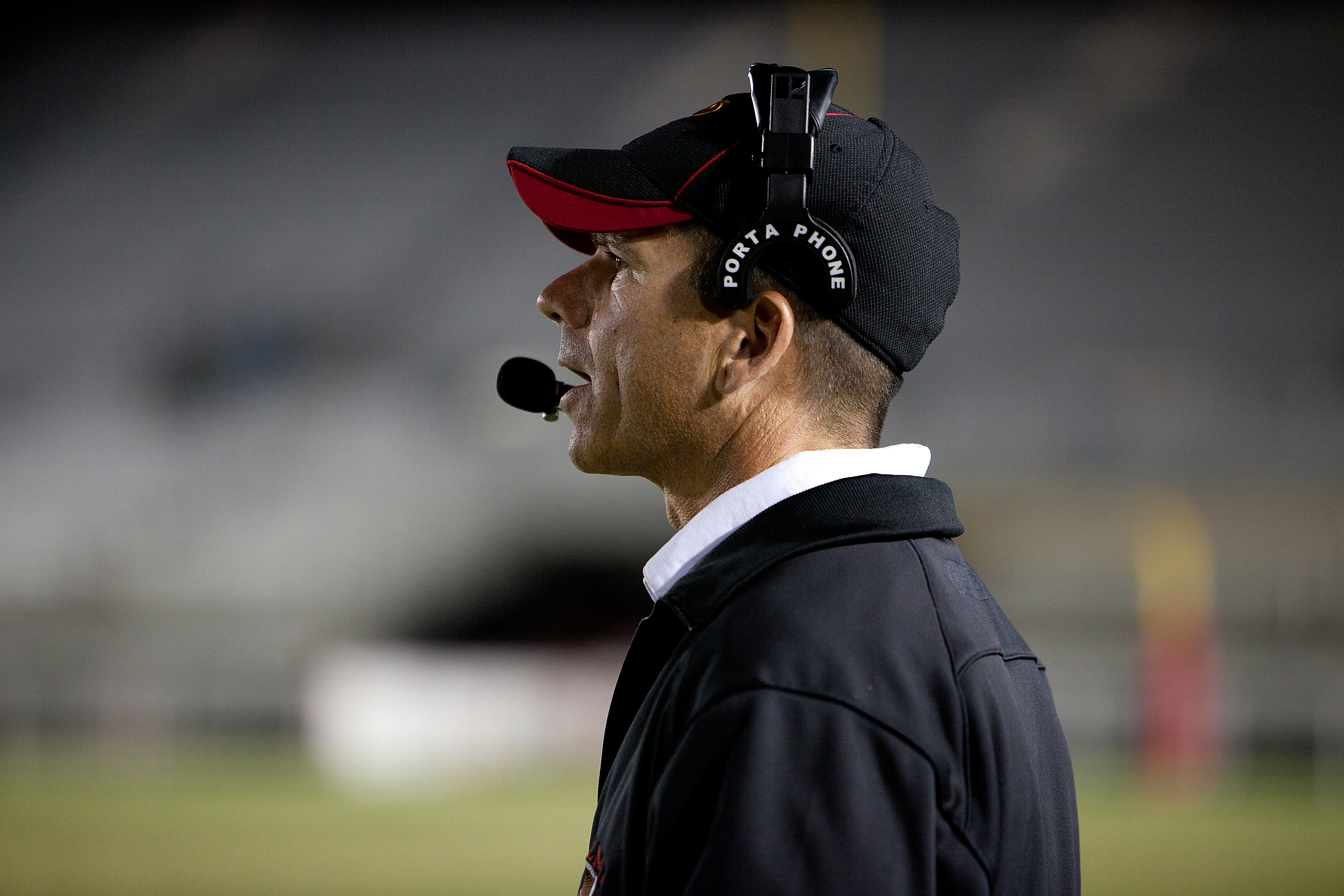
- Jeff Carnazzo

Current position
- Title: Head coach
- Team: Palma High School (CA)

Biographical details
- Born: February 10, 1967 (age 59); Omaha, Nebraska, U.S.

Coaching career (HC unless noted)
- 1990–2000 (linebackers): Palma High School (CA)
- 2000–present (head): Palma High School (CA)

Head coaching record
- Overall: 184–48–5

Accomplishments and honors

Championships
- CIF CCS Div I Champions (2000, 2001, 2003); CIF CCS Div IV Champions (2011); MBL Champions (2000, 2001); TCAL Champions (2003, 2004, 2005, 2006, 2008, 2009, 2010, 2011, 2012); MBL (Gabilan Division) Champions (2012, 2013, 2014, 2015); PCAL (Gabilan Division) Champions (2016,2018)

Awards
- 8× Monterey Bay League/Tri-County Athletic League Coach of the Year; 2× Central Coast Section Coach of the Year; San Francisco 49er Coach of the Year (2003); 2× San Francisco 49er Coach of the Week (2003, 2009)

Jeff Carnazzo (/karnaːzoʊ/; born February 10, 1967) is an American football coach and the current head coach at Palma High School, a position he has held since 2000. Carnazzo previously served as the junior varsity linebackers coach before his time as varsity head coach. In his first year as coach, Carnazzo guided his team to a championship in Division I of the Central Coast Section. Along with his duties as head football coach, Carnazzo teaches United States History, Advanced Placement United States History, and Physical Education.

== Education ==
Carnazzo attended Palma High School from 1981 to 1985, where he lettered in football and baseball. Carnazzo was coached by Norm Costa, his future predecessor. After his time at Palma, Carnazzo graduated in 1989 from California State University, Fresno, where he received a Bachelor of Arts in Exercise Physiology. In 1990, he returned to Palma High School, where he began teaching United States History and coaching junior varsity football. During the early years, Carnazzo attended Chapman University, where he received his Single Subject Teaching Credential and his master's degree in Education.

== Personal life ==
Jeff Carnazzo is married to his wife, Stacy. He has two adult children, Joe and Olivia Carnazzo, who both attended University of California, Davis.

== Year-by-year results ==
Pacific Coast Athletic League Gabilan Division (2019)
8–2 (6–1)

Pacific Coast Athletic League Gabilan Division (2018)
10–2 (6–1)
*League Champions

Pacific Coast Athletic League Gabilan Division (2017)
7–5 (5-2)

Monterey Bay League Gabilan Division (2016)
10–4 (6–0)
*League Champions

Monterey Bay League Gabilan Division (2015)
10–2 (6–0)
*League Champions

Monterey Bay League Gabilan Division (2014)
9–2 (5–1)
*League Champions

Monterey Bay League Gabilan Division (2013)
7–4 (6–0)
*League Champions

Monterey Bay League Gabilan Division (2012)
8-3 (6-0)
*League Champions

Tri-County Athletic League (2011)
11-1-1 (5-1)
*League Champions
*CCS Division IV Champions

Tri-County Athletic League (2010)
10-1-1 (6-0)
*League Champions

Tri-County Athletic League (2009)
8-2-1 (6-0)
*League Champions

Tri-County Athletic League (2008)
8-3 (5-1)
*League Champions

Tri-County Athletic League (2007)
8-3 (5-1)

Tri-County Athletic League (2006)
10-2 (6-0)
*League Champions

Tri-County Athletic League (2005)
10-3 (4-1)
*League Champions

Tri-County Athletic League (2004)
7-3-1 (4-1)
*League Champions

Tri-County Athletic League (2003)
11-2 (5-0)
*League Champions
*CCS Division I Champions

Tri-County Athletic League (2002)
9-2 (4-1)

Monterey Bay League (2001)
12-1 (8-1)
*League Champions
*CCS Division I Champions

Monterey Bay League (2000)
11-1-1 (7-1-1)
*League Champions
*CCS Division I Champions

== Notable players and coaches ==
- Chris Dalman—Class of 1988, moved on to Stanford University and was a guard and center for the San Francisco 49ers. Coach with the Atlanta Falcons in 2006 and Stanford. In 2009, he returned to working and coaching the offensive line at Palma High School.
- David Fales (class of 2009)—Former Palma quarterback, moved on to University of Nevada Reno, transferred to Monterey Peninsula College, and finally to San Jose State University. Currently a quarterback for the Chicago Bears.
- Elliot Vallejo—Offensive lineman, Arizona Cardinals
- Michael Gasperson—Receiver, Philadelphia Eagles
- Orlando Johnson—Guard, Indiana Pacers
- Brian Reader—Quarterback, Iowa Barnstormers
