= Joe Boxers =

Joe Boxers may refer to:

- Joe Boxer, a brand of underwear
- JoBoxers, a British rock band active 1982–1985
