= Tom Fanoe =

Tom Fanoe (born 1946) is the President and COO of Joe Boxer.

Prior to Joe Boxer, Tom served as the President of Levi Strauss's US Division, a company he had been a part of for 28 years before his promotion. He has also served as the company's vice president for customer relations. Tom holds an MBA from the Haas School of Business at the University of California, Berkeley. He attended Palma High School and was elected to the Palma Sports Hall of Fame in 2006.
