= Nick Graham =

Nick Graham may refer to:

- Nick Graham (American football) (born 1984)
- Nick Graham (Australian footballer) (born 1994), Australian rules footballer
- Nick Graham (rugby league) (born 1974), Australian rugby league footballer
- Nick Graham (musician), vocalist, songwriter, flautist and bass player
- Nicholas Graham, Canadian businessman and entrepreneur
