= Wimberley Bluegrass Band =

Californian family bluegrass music band

- Genres: Bluegrass; Country; Christian; Gospel; Roots
- Years active: 2008-Present
- Award: California American Entertainers Hall of Fame (2026)
- Members: Danielle Wimberley James Wimberley Mark Wimberley Michael Wimberley
- Website: www.wimberleybluegrassband.com

Wimberley Bluegrass Band is an American bluegrass group that has been recording and performing since 2008. The band is made up of the Wimberley siblings, Danielle, James, Mark, and Michael. Their musical style is strongly rooted in vocal harmonies and draws heavily on traditional 1940s-era bluegrass and western swing. The group gained prominence in the Los Angeles music scene after an article appeared in CBS-LA naming them one of LA's Top-Five Bluegrass Bands.

In 2026, Wimberley Bluegrass Band was inducted into the California American Entertainers Hall of Fame.

== History ==
The Wimberley siblings grew up in California and asked their parents for a banjo one Christmas after hearing Foggy Mountain Breakdown by the Nitty Gritty Dirt Band's Will The Circle Be Unbroken Vol. 1 album. They began performing regularly at Los Rios Rancho in Oak Glen, California. They developed an encyclopedic knowledge of the music's history, often memorizing album personnel from liner notes.

Within the next few years, Wimberley Bluegrass Band began performing and headlining at festivals and making occasional television and radio appearances.

== Influences ==
Wimberley Bluegrass Band members cited musical influences like Bill Monroe, Flatt and Scruggs, Ricky Skaggs, and Doyle Lawson.

== College and academia ==
In 2011, the Wimberley siblings made the choice to go to college at the same time, despite ranging five years in age from eldest to youngest. They continued to perform during this time, incorporating their music into their academic careers, with a radio program on Chapman Radio and participating in their KCET broadcasts. They graduated from Chapman University together, walking commencement in the same weekend in 2016. At the time, Michael was 17, making him Chapman University's youngest graduate.

== Notable work ==
The Wimberley Bluegrass Band met actor Atticus Shaffer at a concert in Pasadena and through that introduction, Wimberley Bluegrass Band's original Hard Working Man was featured on an episode of ABC's hit sitcom The Middle.

Wimberley Bluegrass Band participated in a benefit concert with John C Reilly produced by The New LA Folk Festival and LA Record for the Japanese Red Cross Society.

Wimberley Bluegrass Band made an unaired appearance on season 9 of America's Got Talent.

During their studies at Chapman University, they gave a bluegrass demonstration at TEDxChapmanU

Wimberley Bluegrass Band appeared as a guest on Jonas & Warren's song California to Tennessee.

Danielle and James, were featured musicians and background actors for a KFC Commercial featuring Darrell Hammond, parodying Colonel Sanders' Mandolin Band.

Wimberley Bluegrass Band were part of the inaugural performance at the Musco Center for the Arts along with the Mariachi Divas. They occasionally tour with Dennis Agajanian, making appearances with Greg Laurie, Franklin Graham, and Wil Graham.

== Music ==
Wimberley Bluegrass Band has released eight albums since 2008, four of which are still in print. They perform a mix of traditional and original music.

== Members ==
- Danielle Wimberley - mandolin, vocals
- James Wimberley - banjo, dobro, vocals
- Mark Wimberley - guitar, bass, vocals
- Michael Wimberley - fiddle, vocals

== Awards and Recognition ==
In 2010, Wimberley Bluegrass Band won 3rd place at the Topanga Banjo/Fiddle Contest band competition when they were very new to performing.

Later that year, CBS-LA ran a news story heralding them as one of Los Angeles' Top Five Bluegrass Bands, calling them "exceptionally talented" and "sensational".

In 2026, the California American Entertainment Hall of Fame announced Wimberley Bluegrass Band was included in their lineup of inductees. The Hall of Fame recognizes honors the artists, musicians, and visionaries who have contributed significantly to the state’s rich and diverse musical heritage and those whose talent and influence have elevated California’s place in the global music landscape. Also inducted that year was Verdine White (Earth, Wind, and Fire), Cannibal and the Headhunters, Tierra, and Shotgun Kelly.
