= Bramlet =

Bramlet is a surname. Notable people with the surname include:

- Al Bramlet (1917–1977), labor union leader
- Casey Bramlet (born 1981), American football player
- Corey Bramlet (born 1983), American football player, brother of Casey

== See also ==
- Bramlett
