= Notre Dame High School (Salinas, California) =

Location
- 455 Palma Drive; Salinas, (Monterey County), California 93901; United States; 36°39′52″N 121°40′8″W

Information
- Type: Private, All-Female
- Religious affiliation: Catholic
- Established: 1964
- Principal: Timothy Uhl
- Grades: 9-12
- Average class size: 18
- Colors: Blue, gold and White
- Slogan: For time and for eternity
- Athletics conference: Pacific Coast Athletic League (PCAL)
- Team name: Spirits
- Accreditation: Western Association of Schools and Colleges
- Yearbook: The Summit
- Website: www.notredamesalinas.org

Notre Dame High School is a private, all-female, Catholic high school in Salinas, California. It is located in the Diocese of Monterey.

== Background ==
Notre Dame was originally founded as the all-girls section of Palma School, before being established as a separate school in 1964 by the Diocese of Monterey under the direction of the Sisters of Notre Dame de Namur.

Notre Dame is located one block away from its sister school, Palma, a Catholic all-boys school.
