= Bramlett =

Bramlett or Bramlette is a surname of European origin.

== Bramlett Name Meaning ==
English: This American family name was widespread recorded in England. Spelled with a number of variations The BRAMLETT family dates back to the 1540s in Devonshire, Yorkshire and Durham.

== Bramlett American Origins ==
A 1690 transport record lists the name Ambrose BAMBLET. He was transported by John Lydell along with 44 others to VA. The record shows John received 2000+ acres in New Kent Co., VA for his efforts.

The first known William Bramlitt/Bramlett in the US was born (est) Before 1694. Under English Common Law he had to be 21 to be a witness to the deed dated 1716 and son Henry Sr was born Abt 1710 lived in Essex & Caroline Co., VA and moved about 1750–1752 to Lunenburg Co., VA. [part of Lunenburg formed Bedford Co., VA, in 1754.] The 1752 Lunenburg Co. tax list shows William Sr and William Jr Bramlett living in the same household. William Sr probably died soon after giving his stock & household goods to son-in-law Stephen White in November 1759. This action, along with comments regarding his will "bearing date 6th of February 1750" and maintenance "agreeable to my age" shows he was an elderly man in 1759.

== Famous Bramletts ==
The name refers to:

- James Edwin Bramlett (b. 1932), Western artist, writer, and was an extra in the Movie Billy Jack
- A. J. Bramblett (b. 1977), American professional basketball player
- Bekka Bramlett (b. 1968), American singer; daughter of Delaney and Bonnie Bramlett
- Bonnie Bramlett (b. 1944), American pop and rock singer
- David A. Bramlett (b. 1941), American army general officer; Commander of U.S. Army Forces Command 1996–98
- David E. Bramlet (1954–2018), American botanist
- Delaney Bramlett (1939–2008), American singer, songwriter, and producer
- Elic Bramlett, Actor
- John Bramlett (1941–2014), American professional football player
- Ron Bramlett (b. 1979), American track and field athlete
- Thomas E. Bramlette (1817–1875), American politician; Governor of Kentucky 1863–67
- Tiquette Bramlett, American winemaker

== Places named Bramlett ==
Feature Name	St	County Name	Type	Latitude	Longitude	USGS 7.5' Map
Bramblett Ranch	TX	Hudspeth	locale	305758N	1051753W	Cedar Arroyo
Bramlet Place	CA	Trinity	pop place	401538N	1230943W	Smoky Creek
Bramlette Ranch	CA	Mono	locale	375312N	1182917W	Truman Meadows
Bramlet Mine	GA	Murray	mine	344442N	0844310W	Ramhurst
Bramlet Ridge	GA	Rabun	ridge	345058N	0833659W	Lake Burton
Bramlet Cemetery	IL	Saline	cemetery	374752N	0883029W	Galatia
Bramlett	KY	Green	pop place	370943N	0852743W	Gresham
Bramlette Church	KY	Gallatin	church	384114N	0845625W	Sanders
Bramlett Cemetery	MS	Pontotoc	cemetery	341131N	0891331W	Randolph
Bramlett Elementary School	MS	Lafayette	school	342205N	0893035W	Oxford South
Bramlet Creek	MT	Lincoln	stream	480216N	1152924W	Barren Peak
Bramlet Creek Mine	MT	Lincoln	mine	480228N	1153236W	Howard Lake
Bramlet Lake	MT	Lincoln	lake	480147N	1153309W	Howard Lake
Bramlette Dam	MT	Chouteau	dam	474124N	1104148W	Shonkin NW
Bramlett	NM	Socorro	pop place	312003N	1085036W	Lang Canyon
Bramlett Post Office (historical)	NM	Hidalgo	post office	312003N	1085036W	Lang Canyon
Bramlett Spring	NM	Union	spring	365652N	1030445W	Goodson School
Bramlett Stage Station	NV	Humboldt	locale	414908N	1183319W	Denio Summit
Bramlett Well	NV	Humboldt	well	414718N	1183208W	Denio Summit
Bramlet Memorial Cemetery	OR	Wallowa	cemetery	453640N	1173359W	Wallowa
Bramlett Cemetery	SC	Laurens	cemetery	343930N	0820225W	Woodruff
Bramlett Church	SC	Laurens	church	343929N	0820225W	Woodruff
Bramlett Ranch	TX	Hudspeth	locale	304134N	1050325W	Bramlett Ranch
Bramlette School	TX	Gregg	school	323041N	0944425W	Longview Heights
Bramletts Mountain	VA	Bedford	summit	371608N	0794153W	Irving
