= 2003 Connaught Creek Valley avalanche =

Fatal disaster in British Columbia, Canada

Coordinates: 51.283°N 117.552°W

- Date: 1 February 2003
- Location: Balu Pass Trail, Connaught Creek Valley, Glacier National Park
- Deaths: 7
- Injuries: 10

The 2003 Connaught Creek Valley avalanche on Saturday, 1 February 2003 killed seven teenagers in the Columbia Mountains at the foot of Mount Cheops east of Revelstoke, British Columbia, Canada. It followed another avalanche which had killed seven adult skiers on 20 January 2003 on the Durrand Glacier, located in the same area and caused by a rain crust formed at the same time.

== Background ==
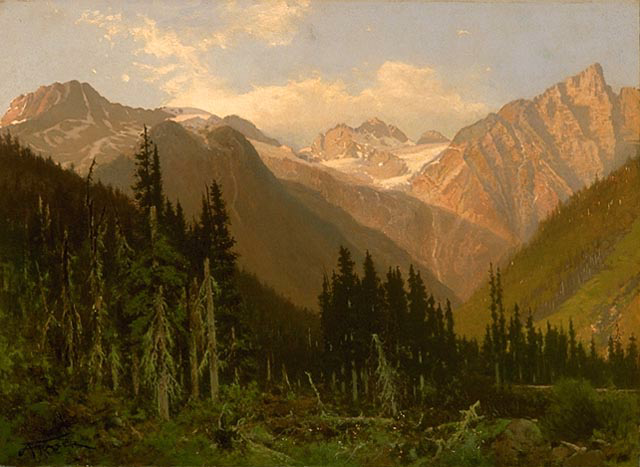
Rogers Pass area

The 14 scholars and their three adult group leaders, two of whom were experienced skiers and trained in avalanche education, were from Strathcona-Tweedsmuir School near Okotoks. They were on the annual 10th grade class backcountry skiing trip, a four-day trip and a 27-year-old tradition of the school's outdoor education program. The group were hiking along the Balu Pass Trail in the Connaught Creek Valley in British Columbia's Glacier National Park, some 5 km west of the Rogers Pass summit, scene of the 1910 avalanche disaster.

Those on the trip were educated in avalanche and other potential dangers of the area. On the first day while supervised by Andrew Nicholson and Dale Roth, both avalanche-certified teachers, the students dug avalanche pits, did snowpack testing and performed compression tests on every slope.

== Incident ==
On the second day of the trip, the avalanche risk was deemed "considerable" or in the middle of the five-level scale, which proposes that natural avalanches were possible and human-triggered were likely. That day the students were following avalanche protocol of keeping 30 to 50 feet between pairs, and instructors stopped the group early in the trip to quiz each student about avalanche safety protocol. At 11:45 a.m. two mountain guides, who happened to be in the same area, heard a crack signaling the avalanche's start and shouted warnings to the school group below, who were swept away moments later. A student survivor claimed that the day was unseasonably warm, and that there was no warning until he heard a shout. He turned and saw the avalanche come down the mountain, and then the group leader removing his back pack and skis. He attempted to do the same but was hit by a wall of powder.

The guides raced down to the site, freeing those whose hands and legs were showing above the snow, and searching for those buried deeper using the avalanche transceivers which the scholars were all carrying. The first person that was uncovered was the group leader who had the only satellite phone and immediately used it to call for help for aiding in the search. The phone call alerted rescuers five minutes later. 35 rescuers with helicopters soon reached the scene, and within 80 minutes of the avalanche the 10 survivors and 7 fatalities had been located.

== Victims ==
The deceased were six boys and one girl: Ben Albert, Daniel Arato, Scott Broshko, Michael Shaw, Alex Pattillo, Jeff Trickett, and Marissa Staddon. They were all residents of Calgary.

== Aftermath ==
Once the shock had abated, the school reviewed and revised its outdoor education program, and decided to carry on with the backcountry ski program subject to rigorous safety measures. In order for students to be able to engage in the program, parents and students are shown briefings on activities and the different environments, which list potential hazards and measures to protect the students. This was done after an independent report into the avalanche concluded the school did not adequately warn the parents of the risks for the trip and concentrated on the idea of adventure rather than education.

Under a new risk classification system the Connaught Creek area was rated as a Class 3 region, unsuitable for school groups, and therefore off-limits.

In 2013, the school held a private memorial for the survivors and the family and friends of the victims, to mark the tenth anniversary of the disaster.
