= Louise Lincoln Kerr =

American musician (1892–1977)

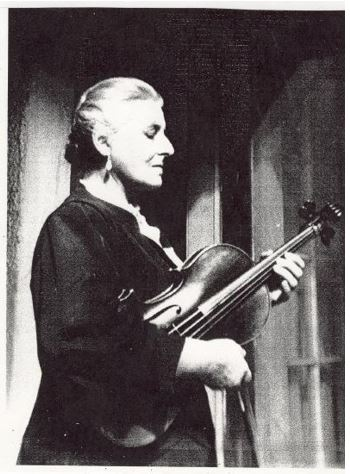

Background information
- Born: Myrtie Louise Lincoln; April 24, 1892; Cleveland, Ohio, U.S.
- Died: December 10, 1977 (aged 85) Cottonwood, Arizona
- Genres: Classical music
- Instruments: Violin, viola and piano

Louise Lincoln Kerr (April 24, 1892 – December 10, 1977) was an American musician, composer, and philanthropist from Cleveland, Ohio. She wrote more than 100 music compositions, including fifteen symphonic tone poems, twenty works for chamber or string orchestra, a violin concerto, five ballets and incidental music, numerous piano pieces, and about forty pieces of chamber music. She was known as "The Grand Lady of Music" for her patronage of the arts. Louise Kerr helped to co-found and developed The Phoenix Symphony (1947), The Phoenix Chamber Music Society (1960), The Scottsdale Center for the Arts, The National Society of Arts and Letters (1944) (in Phoenix, Arizona), Monday Morning Musicals, The Bach and Madrigal Society (1958) (now the Phoenix Chorale), Young Audiences, The Musicians Club, and the Phoenix Cello Society (now the Arizona Cello Society). Kerr was also a benefactor to the Herberger School of Music at Arizona State University. She was inducted into the Arizona Women's Hall of Fame on October 21, 2004 and was nominated by conductor and musicologist Carolyn Waters Broe.

== Biography ==
=== Early life ===
Louise Lincoln was born in Cleveland, Ohio, on April 24, 1892. Her father, John C. Lincoln, was a notable engineer who founded Lincoln Electric. She was born Myrtie Louise Lincoln after her mother Myrtle and her grandmother Louisa but changed her name to Louise Lincoln in grade school before 1905. Kerr's mother Myrtle was a musician and taught Louise how to play the piano at age six, violin at age seven, and she later learned to play viola. Lincoln furthered her skills under Sol Marcosson, a concertmaster of the early Cleveland Symphony Orchestra (CSO).

=== Education and career ===
Louise Lincoln attended Barnard College in the year 1910 in New York City, an institution with strong ties to Columbia University. Columbia Professor Daniel Gregory Mason taught her elementary music form and advanced harmony and Professor Cornelius Rubner taught her composition and symphonic orchestration. Lincoln won a pair of awards for her vocal compositions while attending college. She also studied for a time with Igor Stravinsky and Sergei Prokofiev. While at Barnard, she took private violin lessons with Dutch soloist Christiaan Timmner at the Institute of Musical Art, which would later become part of the Juilliard School of Music. She left New York around 1913 due to the death of her mother and to join the Cleveland Municipal Orchestra under the direction of Christiaan Timmner. When Timmner was appointed conductor of the early CSO, he extended an invitation to Lincoln to join his violin section. She was one of the youngest members of the orchestra and one of only two women.

By 1920, she had returned to New York after she married Peter Kjer (pronounced "Care") and started her family of eight children. During this time, she did not play her violin nor compose. While in New York, she got a job working for the Aeolian Company proofing piano rolls for player pianos. There Louise Kerr met with noted pianists and composers who were recording their music, including Sergei Prokofiev, Alfred Cortot, and George Gershwin. Gershwin worked for Aeolian Company at the same time as Kerr. She was also a friend of the renowned conductor of the New York Philharmonic, Dimitri Mitropoulos, and the violinist Isaac Stern.

When one of her daughters developed a respiratory condition, the Kjer family moved to Phoenix, Arizona, in 1936. They also built homes in Cottonwood and Scottsdale, Arizona, and Pasadena, California. They changed their name to Kerr to match the name of actress Deborah Kerr. After Peter Kerr died in 1939, Louise returned to music composition. In 1940 she buried two of her daughters. One died of tuberculosis and the other in an accident in Flagstaff, Arizona. While in Los Angeles, Kerr's violin was stolen on December 7, 1941. Later, she continued to perform on the viola as her main instrument with the Pasadena Symphony, Phoenix and Flagstaff Symphonies. She was a founding member of the Phoenix Symphony when it was founded in 1947, donating funds and property for the organization.

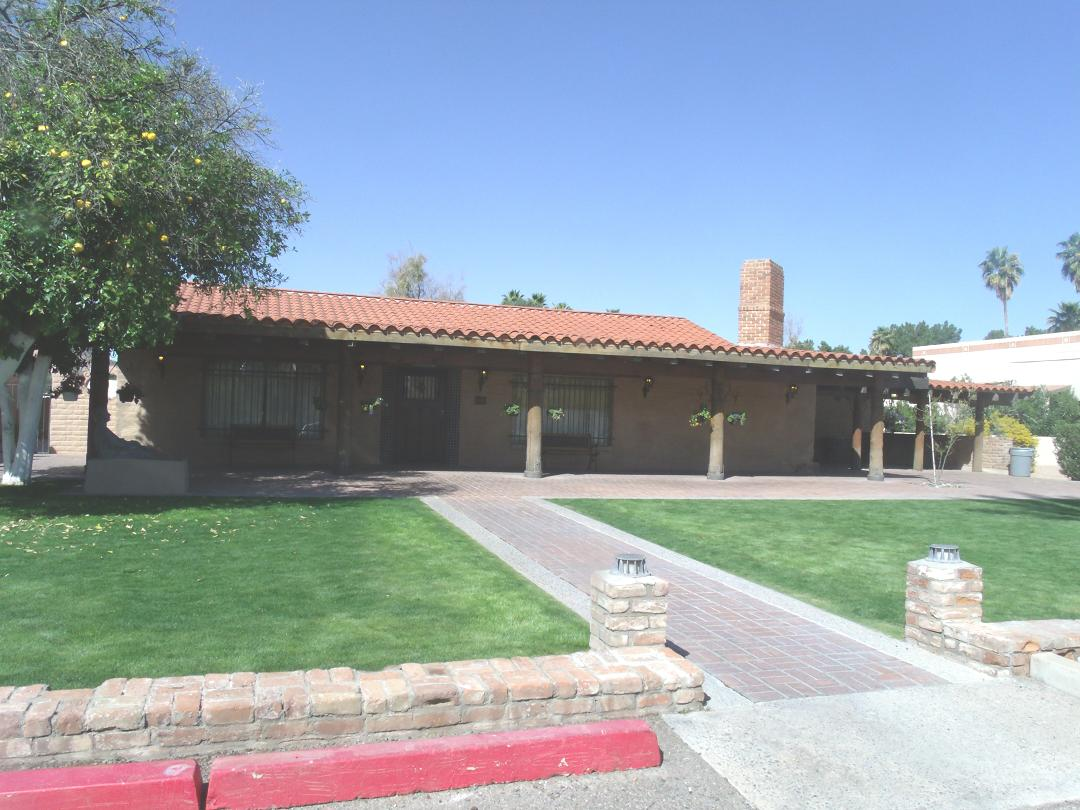
Kerr's home and studio, donated to Arizona State University

Kerr's symphonic piece "Arizona Profiles" was commissioned for the groundbreaking dedication ceremonies of the Scottsdale Center for the Performing Arts in 1968 and premiered by the Phoenix Symphony. Four Seasons Orchestra performed her Enchanted Mesa at the concert of Surprise Stadium in the year 2004 and also at Phoenix in June 2009. The same orchestra is known for arranging the European premiere of Kerr's Enchanted Mesa in Vienna, Austria on June 27, 2009 for the Haydn Festival and have performed several of her chamber orchestra and chamber music pieces for the Arizona Centennial in 2012. The Four Seasons String Quartet performed her String Quartet in A Major in 2001 at ASU and several other places.

Her ballet Tableau Vivant was commissioned for the installation of John Waddell's twelve statues in front of Phoenix Symphony Hall and premiered by the Phoenix Symphony in 1975. Very few of Kerr's works have been officially edited or published publicly.

== Legacy ==
Louise Lincoln Kerr died at her ranch in Cottonwood, Arizona, on December 10, 1977, of heart failure, aged 85. She left a legacy in her estate to the College of Fine Arts at Arizona State University. She was a major benefactor of the School of Music at Arizona State University by establishing the Kerr Memorial Scholarship Fund. Kerr presented her private music library to the ASU Herberger School of Music. She also donated her extensive collection of orchestral and chamber music manuscripts (labeled MSS-90) to the ASU Archives and Manuscripts at Haydn Library. In addition, she donated her Scottsdale home and studio to ASU to be used as a chamber music venue, now the ASU Kerr Cultural Center. She received a gold medal for distinguished contribution to the arts from the National Society of the Arts and Letters. Shortly before her death, Kerr was awarded an honorary Doctorate from ASU; however, she was unable to receive this award in person. Throughout her career, Kerr composed more than 100 works. She was posthumously inducted into the Arizona Women's Hall of Fame on October 21, 2004. Her former home and studio in Scottsdale was recognized with a listing on the National Register of Historic Places on April 14, 2010. Concerts are still being performed at this venue. This is now an Arizona State and National Heritage site.

== Compositional style ==
Louise Lincoln's compositional style has been determined as being tonal and the same is also found to be influenced by romantic and classical genre. Her music has been categorized to be typically showing Southwest Impressionism as her creations were found to be heavily influenced by the local peculiarity of American Southwest. Such characterization had been furthered by the creations of influences of impressionist painters from California and Arizona during her stay for the years 1940s. It is also a fact that she and her elder daughter Tammara, both were painters. Analysis of Kerr's music shows the inclusion of musical elements of local cowboys and the cultures of local Native Americans and Hispanics. Some of her pieces have been found to be having influences from her famous co-workers (pianists) while her stay at New York during 1920s. In addition to that, some jazz influences are also found at some of the pieces. According to her son William Kerr, even though she had the means and contacts to publish her music in New York, Louise Kerr refrained from doing the same, showing the modest part of her. Almost all of her creations are officially unpublished. Also, not all of her creations could be dated and premiere dates and names of compositions were also found lost after her death. Though some has carried out the analysis of her music based on the availability, a full picture of ascertaining the same had not been possible due to the fact that Reel to Reel recordings of most of the premiere dates of her creations had been lost. Five Character Pieces for Viola and Piano, edited by Carolyn Waters Broe, is the first of Kerr's published works. American Viola Society have also published a new edition of Kerr's "Etude for Violin and Viola".

== Work list ==
Type of work	Details (premiere dates)
Works for full orchestra	Arizona Pageant
Works for full orchestra	Children's March
Works for full orchestra	Comanche Song
Works for full orchestra	Country Fiddler
Works for full orchestra	Enchanted Mesa for Orchestra (1948)
Works for full orchestra	Enchanted Mesa (for Soprano and Orchestra)
Works for full orchestra	Ileana
Works for full orchestra	Indian Lullaby (1953/1954)
Works for full orchestra	Indian Round Dance (1953)
Works for full orchestra	Profiles of Arizona (1968)
Works for full orchestra	Senor Alcalde Mayor
Works for full orchestra	Sicilienne
Works for full orchestra	Spanish Town
Works for full orchestra	Suite for Orchestra (1952)
Works for full orchestra	Suite -Rigaudon
Ballets and incidental music	Indian Legend (Ballet Noelpie)
Ballets and incidental music	La Muerta de la Locura
Ballets and incidental music	Naked Came I (1957)
Ballets and incidental music	Peer Gynt
Ballets and incidental music	Tableau Vivant (1974)
Chamber orchestra	Ballade
Chamber orchestra	Concerto for Violin, Strings and Piano
Chamber orchestra	Little Lost Girl
Chamber orchestra	In Memoriam
Chamber orchestra	Indian Poem
Chamber orchestra	Nocturne
Chamber orchestra	Pastorale Symphony
Chamber orchestra	Prelude for Winds and Piano
Chamber orchestra	Prelude, Arioso, and Rigaudon for Flute, Oboe and Strings
Chamber orchestra	Prelude for Winds and Strings
Chamber orchestra	Presto for Winds and Strings
Chamber orchestra	Quintet for Oboe and Strings (1961)
Chamber orchestra	Rigaudon #2
Chamber orchestra	Romance
Chamber music Piano solo	Preludes: I – XII (1966–1969)
Chamber music Piano solo	Toccata
Chamber music Piano solo	Soliloquy (Left Hand Alone)
Chamber music Duos	Cello and Piano: Habanera and Toccata
Chamber music Duos	Viola and Piano: Berceuse, Habanera, Lament, Las Fatigas Del Querer, Toccata.
Chamber music Duos	Violin and Piano: Aubade, Berceuse (April 1945), Country Fiddler (Aug. 1947), Las Fatigas del Querer, Habanera in A minor and F minor, Happy Birthday to You (1971), Hebrew Song (Sept. 1942), In Memoriam, Legend, Lingara, Marche Mignonne, Moong-wah (Hopi Lullaby about a Hopi woman giving birth, composed 1967), Prelude (Version I & II), [(1971) for Diane Sullivan violin and Betty Cummings piano] Presto (written between 1970 and 1975), Rigaudon, Spanish Dance (Spanish Folk Song) (1972 or 73), Tempo di Valse, and Waltz.
Chamber music Duos	Sonata for Violin and Piano in A Major (two movements), April 24, 1914
Chamber music Duos	Violin and Viola Duos: Etude (performed at ASU Kerr Centre in 1975 and April 21, 2001) and Orientale
Chamber music Duos	Piano Duo (four hands): Muerto de la Locura, Rigaudon, Tarantella, Untitled (also orchestrated score), Cancion Espagnol (Senior Alcalde Major). (1970)
Chamber music Duos	Quartets, Quintets and Trio Piano Quartets and Quintets: In Memoriam, Mau Corazon, Nocturne, Nostalie, Suite for Piano Quintet (also orchestrated score), and Rigaudon.
Chamber music Duos	String Quartet in A Major (four movements) – Premiered April 22, 2001 Four Seasons String Quartet, ASU.
Chamber music Duos	String Quartets Movements: Ballade, German Dance, Mau Corazon, Mazurka, Midnight, Passepied, Pastorale, Rigaudon, Serenade, Shabat Shalom.
Chamber music Duos	Trio for Piano, Clarinet and Cello – Premiered by Charles Bowers clarinetist, Rolland Searight cellist, and Arnold Bullock pianist c.1960 at ASU. This work was reviewed by Huff in 1966.
Vocal compositions	Dor Me Jesu
Vocal compositions	Indian Poem (version with strings)
Vocal compositions	Indian Serenade for Soprano, Flute and Piano
Vocal compositions	Song of an Indian Woman
Miscellaneous compositions	Various pieces for piano and one instrument
Miscellaneous compositions	L'Ondine (sketches and fragments)
Miscellaneous compositions	Preludes (sketches and fragments)
Miscellaneous compositions	Nocturnes (various sketches)
Miscellaneous compositions	Various sketches and fragments
Lost works	Chorus – To Aurora, Goddess of Dawn (1911) Barnard College, New York.
Lost works	Chorus – To Iris, Goddess of the Rainbow (1912) awarded winning composer for 1912 chorus by Barnard College, New York.

== Bibliography ==
- Five Character Pieces for Viola and Piano – Louise Lincoln Kerr, Ed. Carolyn Waters Broe, (Scottsdale, AZ: Classics Unlimited Music, 2002)
- The String Compositions of Louise Lincoln Kerr Analysis and Editing of Five Solo Viola Pieces – Carolyn Waters Broe, ISBN 978-1-59942-357-9
- Four Seasons Orchestra's CD release of Arizona Profiles The Music of Louise Lincoln Kerr.

== Sources ==
- "Scottsdale Civic Center Audience Gives Standing Ovation To Mrs. Kerr", Phoenix Gazette, October 1968,
- "John Henrey Waddell/Sculptor And Painter Metal Master Sculptor Breathes Life Into Bronze Figures". Phoenix, The Arizona Republic, May 2, 1993, p. 14.
- "A Gracious Lady Dies". Scottsdale Daily Progress, December 13, 1977.
- "Louise L. Kerr, arts patron, dies". Scottsdale Daily Progress, December 12, 1977
- Kelly Tim. "Face of Arizona Louise Lincoln Kerr, Musician". Phoenix Point West, February 1965, pp. 30–34.
- Portnoff, Collice. "Composer – of Note Louise Kerr". Phoenix (Arizona) Southwest Art Scene, March 1968, vol. 1, no. 7.
- Drobatschewsky, Dimitri. "Kerr Tribute to Honor 'Lively Lady'". Phoenix: The Arizona Republic, December 11, 1977.
- "Death of arts backer Louise Lincoln Kerr "Grand Lady of Music". Phoenix: The Arizona Republic, December 11, 1977.
- "Oral History". Transcript by Portnoff, Collice, Department of Archives and Manuscripts, University Libraries, Arizona State University, Tempe, AZ.
- "Through the Years A Quiet Woman Built and Broadened Valley Arts", Scottsdale Progress, March 14, 1975.
- Yearwood, Pauline. "Symphony of Memories", Jewish News of Greater Phoenix, Vol. 46, No. 48, August 19, 1994.
- Portnoff, Collice. "Composer – of Note Louise Kerr". Phoenix (Arizona) Southwest Art Scene, March 1968, vol. 1, no. 7.
- Pyne, Lynn. "Sculpture Without Wraps John Waddell Creates Bronze Statues That Reflect Life". The Phoenix Gazette, November 30, 1991, Section: Marquee, p. 4.
- "Louise Kerr." Phoenix: The Arizona Republic, October 12, 1978, p. D-7.
- "Louise L. Kerr, arts patron, dies". Scottsdale Daily Progress, December 12, 1977.
- "Louise Lincoln Kerr", editorial, Phoenix: The Arizona Republic, December 12, 1977.
