= Warren P. Waters =

American physicist and semiconductor pioneer

Warren Palmer Waters
- Born: 8 September 1922
- Died: 17 July 2000 (aged 77)
- Occupations: Researcher, Electrical engineer
- Known for: Integrated circuit design
- Notable work: Transistor research Solid state engineering
- Spouse: Lois Virginia Lockwood
- Children: Carolyn Waters Broe, Andrea Rosney, Elizabeth Waters Jennings
- Website: warrenpwaters.org

Warren Palmer Waters (8 September 1922 – 17 July 2000) was an American physicist, electrical engineer, and semiconductor pioneer. He filed several device and process patents in the field of solid state engineering and was the manager of the solid state research center for the Hughes Aircraft Company. Walter's innovative circuit designs led to the success of NASA's Surveyor program.

== Education and military service ==
Waters was born in Sanger, California on 8 September 1922. He graduated with honors from Sanger High School, winning the Bausch+Lomb Honorary Science Award for chemistry.

Waters joined the U.S. Army in 1942 and trained to be a pilot during World War II. He was later deployed to the 386th Infantry division in northern France. He lost a leg in combat on 12 April 1945, and received a Purple Heart and a Bronze Star for his service.

Waters graduated from Caltech in 1949. He received his master's degree from the University of Southern California in 1954 and completed coursework there for a Ph.D. in physics.

== Scientific career ==
Warren P. Waters at Hughes Aircraft, 1954

Waters spent his summers between 1947 and 1951 working at the Los Alamos National Laboratory, helping test new rocket designs.

Waters joined the Hughes Aircraft Company in 1952 and was involved in pioneering research on germanium and silicon bipolar transistors. He filed five patents during this period.

In 1962, he joined Texas Instruments to manage its department for semiconductor research and advanced device development.

In 1966, Waters returned to Hughes as the manager of its solid state research center in 1966, working on microwave devices and designing integrated circuits using gold and silicon Schottky diodes. His patent (with Belardi) is part of the Smithsonian Chip Collection.

In his obituary, the Los Angeles Times reported that Waters' integrated circuit designs were used in NASA's Surveyor program, which landed some of the first unmanned spacecraft on the Moon. The Atomic Heritage Foundation credits him with developing the components used in the landing mechanisms; later Waters helped invent the silicon wafer used in the electronics for telecommunication satellites.

In 1980, Waters joined Rockwell International to work on silicon wafer doping. In 1987, he worked for Western Digital on silicon disk purification and the development of early computer hard disk drives.

== Personal life and death ==
Waters married Lois Lockwood in 1951 in what the Covina Argus-Citizen called "an impressive ceremony"; the wedding was reported in several local newspapers. He was the father of three children: Andrea Rosney, conductor Carolyn Waters Broe, and Lisa Waters.

Waters died on 17 July 2000 and is buried at Pacific View Memorial Park in Corona del Mar, California.

== Waters patents ==
- U.S. patent 2,817,609 Alkali Metal Alloy Agents for Auto-Fluxing in Junction Forming, filed June 24, 1955, issued Dec. 24, 1957
- U.S. patent 2,829,992 Fused Junction Semiconductor Devices and Method of Making Same, filed Feb. 2, 1954, issued April 8, 1958
- U.S. patent 2,829,993 Process for Making Fused Junction Semiconductor Devices with Alkali Metal-Galium, filed June 24, 1955, issued April 8, 1958
- U.S. patent 2,854,366 Method of Making Fused Junction Semiconductor Devices, filed Nov. 25, 1957, issued Sept. 30, 1958
- U.S. patent 2,854,610 Semiconductor Transistor Device, filed Mar. 24, 1955, issued Sept. 30, 1958
- U.S. patent 3,088,856 Fused Junction Semiconductor Devices, filed Sept. 2, 1955, issued May 7, 1963
- U.S. patent 3,388,000 Method of Forming a Metal Contact on a Semi Conductor Device, filed Sept. 18, 1964, issued June 11, 1968
- U.S. patent 3,518,751 Electrical Connection and/or Mounting Arrays for Integrated Circuit Chips, filed May 25, 1967, issued July 7, 1970
- U.S. patent 3,615,929 Method of Forming Epitaxial Region of Predetermined Thickness and Article of Manufacture, filed July 8, 1965, issued Oct. 26, 1971
- U.S. patent 3,651,384 Planar Schottky Barrier, filed March 8, 1971, issued Mar. 21, 1972
- U.S. patent 3,836,991 Semiconductor Device Having Epitaxial Region of Predetermined Thickness, filed Feb. 23, 1973, issued Sept. 17, 1974
