= Drew Dalman =

American football player (born 1998)

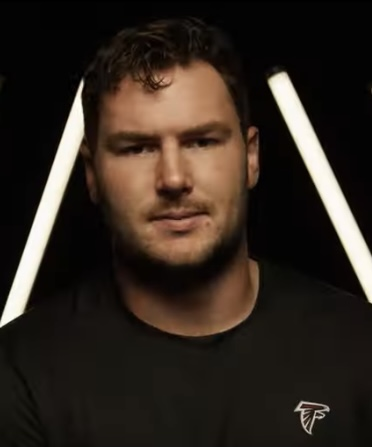
- Dalman in 2021

No. 67, 52
- Position: Center

Personal information
- Born: October 15, 1998 (age 28); Salinas, California, U.S.
- Listed height: 6 ft 3 in (1.91 m)
- Listed weight: 301 lb (137 kg)

Career information
- High school: Palma (Salinas)
- College: Stanford (2017–2020)
- NFL draft: 2021: 4th round, 114th overall pick

Career history
- Atlanta Falcons (2021–2024); Chicago Bears (2025)

Awards and highlights
- Pro Bowl (2025); First-team All-Pac-12 (2020); Second-team All-Pac-12 (2019)

Career NFL statistics
- Games played: 74
- Games started: 57
- Stats at Pro Football Reference

Drew Brazil Dalman (born October 15, 1998) is an American former professional football player who was a center in the National Football League (NFL) for five seasons. He played college football for the Stanford Cardinal and was selected in the fourth round of the 2021 NFL draft by the Atlanta Falcons. He also played for the Chicago Bears.

== College career ==
Dalman was ranked as a three–star recruit out of high school. He committed to Stanford, where his father went to play football, on August 30, 2016. Dalman had other offers from Arizona, Colorado, Fresno State, Idaho, Michigan, Nevada, Washington, Wyoming and Yale. Dalman played 4 years at Stanford as a center. Dalman started 22-of-25 games (20 at center, two at guard) over four years for the Cardinal. Dalman did not allow a single pressure as a senior, fortifying a Stanford offensive line that did not allow a sack all season in 2020. Dalman earned first-team All-Pac-12 Conference honors as a senior and was named team captain. Dalman started all 12 games at center as a junior in 2019 and was named second-team All-Pac 12. Dalman was named to second-team 2020–2021 CoSIDA Academic All-America team after majoring in mechanical engineering and maintaining a 3.61 grade point average.

== Professional career ==
Pre-draft measurables
Height	Weight	Arm length	Hand span	Wingspan	40-yard dash	10-yard split	20-yard split	20-yard shuttle	Three-cone drill	Vertical jump	Broad jump	Bench press
6 ft 3 3/8 in (1.91 m)	299 lb (136 kg)	32 in (0.81 m)	10 1/2 in (0.27 m)	6 ft 4 1/2 in (1.94 m)	5.00 s	1.74 s	2.89 s	4.51 s	7.33 s	33.0 in (0.84 m)	9 ft 1 in (2.77 m)	33 reps
All values from Pro Day

=== Atlanta Falcons ===
Dalman was selected by the Atlanta Falcons with the 114th pick in the fourth round of the 2021 NFL draft. He signed his four-year rookie contract with Atlanta on June 17, 2021.

After his rookie season as a backup, Dalman was named the Falcons starting center from 2022 to 2024.

=== Chicago Bears ===
On March 13, 2025, Dalman signed a three-year, $42 million contract with the Chicago Bears.

Dalman was named to the 2026 Pro Bowl Games, his only career Pro Bowl, after allowing just one sack and 21 pressures. The offensive line finished the 2025 season with 24 sacks surrendered after giving up 68 in 2024.

On March 3, 2026, Dalman reportedly retired from the NFL after five seasons. Given Dalman's success during his first season with the Bears, multiple outlets called the announcement a surprise.

== Personal life ==
Dalman is the son of former San Francisco 49ers player Chris Dalman. Dalman also has a sister named Kate who was previously the operations and recruiting assistant for the Stanford football program.
