= Strathcona-Tweedsmuir School =

Location
- Okotoks, Alberta, T1S 1A2; Canada; 50.7751°N 114.0329°W

Information
- School type: Private/independent
- Motto: Nil Nisi Optimum (Nothing But Our Best)
- Founded: 1971
- Status: Open
- Principal: Rory Stabler (Senior School), Jessica Richmond (Middle School), Season Prevost(Elementary School)
- Head of school: Carol Grant-Watt
- Grades: K–12
- Enrollment: 726
- Average class size: 17
- Language: English
- Schedule type: semestered starting 2023 - 2024 year
- Hours in school day: 6 hours, 35 minutes
- Campuses: One
- Campus: Rural
- Campus size: 220 acres
- Houses: Burns, Buchan, Dover, and Howard
- Colour
- Athletics: Cross-Country, Track & Field, Basketball, Rugby, Field Hockey, Volleyball, Badminton, Soccer
- Mascot: Spartacus the Spartan
- Nickname: Strath, STS
- Team name: Spartans
- Rivals: Webber, Old Scona, West Island College, Oilfields
- Accreditation: CAIS, PYP, MYP, IB
- School fees: $18,020 – $28,000 (Depending on grade level)
- Revenue: N/A
- Website: www.strathconatweedsmuir.com

Strathcona-Tweedsmuir School is a private prep school in Okotoks, Alberta, Canada, from Kindergarten to Grade 12. Strathcona-Tweedsmuir is Southern Alberta's first full IB World School, and Alberta's only independent school authorized to deliver IB Programmes in Grades K through 12. The school participates in Canadian Educational Standards Institute program and is a member of Round Square and the Canadian Accredited Independent Schools (CAIS).

== History ==
The school opened in September 1971 after Strathcona School for Boys and Tweedsmuir: An Academic School for Girls merged. Strathcona was founded in 1929, and Tweedsmuir in 1959, with St. Hilda's School (1889–1949) preceding the latter.

In 2003, seven students from the school were killed in an avalanche in British Columbia while on a skiing trip. The students were on a school ski trip on Mount Cheops near Revelstoke when the avalanche occurred.

== Notable alumni ==
- Robert-Falcon Ouellette, CD (1995), Veteran and Indigenous Member of Parliament
- Peter Lougheed – Former Premier of Alberta (attended Strathcona School for Boys, founding school of STS)
- Craig Adams (1995) - Stanley Cup winning National Hockey League player
- Nicholas Graham (1976), Founder of Joe Boxer
- John Smyth - Barrister and child abuser (attended Strathcona School for Boys, founding school of STS)
