= Carolyn Waters Broe =

American conductor, composer, violist and writer

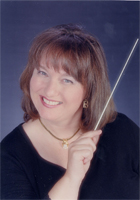
- Born: Carolyn Waters
- Education: Chapman University, California State University Long Beach, Arizona State University
- Occupations: Conductor, composer and violist
- Known for: Founding of Four Seasons Orchestra
- Spouse: Steve Broe
- Children: Two
- Parent(s): Warren P. Waters, Lois Virginia Lockwood

Carolyn Waters Broe is an American conductor, composer, violist and writer, who founded Four Seasons Orchestra in 1992.

== Early life ==
Broe was born to the physicist Warren P. Waters and Lois Virginia Lockwood.

Carolyn is married to Steve Broe and has a son, JeanRene Broe, and a daughter, Jasmine Broe.

== Education and career ==
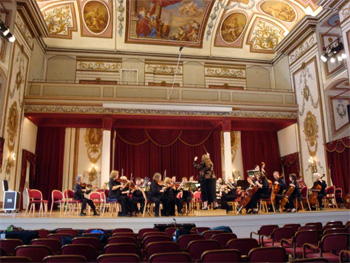
Carolyn Waters Broe conducting on stage

Waters studied viola with Italian concert violinist Rene Bregozzo who studied at the Bologna Conservatory of Music in Italy and he later taught violin at the New Conservatorium in Melbourne, Australia. She studied viola also with noted violists Dr. Thomas Hall at Chapman University, Robert Becker of the New York String Quartet, Louis Kievman of the NBC Symphony with Toscanini, Jerry Epstein of the Los Angeles Philharmonic at the University of California at Irvine, Romanian solo violist Adriana Chirilov, and Dr. William Magers at Arizona State University. She studied conducting at Chapman University with John Koshak who studied at the Mozartium in Salzburg. She also attended conducting master classes with Herbert Blomstedt, Leonard Bernstein, and Seiji Ozawa.

Broe started her career as the founder and violist of the noted Opus Four String Quartet from 1982 to 1990.

Broe founded the Four Seasons Orchestra in 1991 in Scottsdale, Arizona as a professional chamber orchestra. She became their resident conductor in April 1992 conducting a concert of music by Mozart and Salieri for Mozart’s bicentennial. She later conducted concerts of Baroque and Classical Women Composers in 1996 and 2005 in Scottsdale and Phoenix. She conducted a 4 July concert with the Four Seasons Orchestra at Surprise Stadium for 10,000 people in 2004. She also wrote the grants, organized, and conducted seven Young Artist Concerts featuring the winners of the Four Seasons Orchestras music competitions. In 2009 Broe conducted the Four Seasons Orchestra on tour in Austria for the International Haydn Festival at the Esterhazy Palace, where Joseph Haydn composed and premiered his works and at the Kozerthaus in Vienna, for his bicentennial. She also conducted a concert of J.S. Bach and Louise Kerr’s music for the Arizona State Centennial celebrations of 2012 at ASU Kerr Cultural Center. She conducted the Mozart, Chopin, and Friends Concert in Scottsdale in 2018 with Chris and Johnny Rice as piano and cello soloists.

Broe is mainly notable for being the founding conductor of the Four Seasons Orchestra in 1992 which was nominated in two Grammy Award categories in 2000 for "Best Small Ensemble" and "Best New Composition" after which she went on to conduct the orchestra at national level and internationally. The Four Seasons Orchestra has, since, itself been an Orchestra with notable performances and reviews. Broe is also the founder and violist of the Four Seasons String Quartet since 1991 to the present.

She was the founder of the Orange County Four Seasons Orchestra in 1990 to 1993 and is the author of "J.S. Bach's Treatment of the Viola in his Cantatas and Brandenburg Concerts" 1984, California State University, Long Beach.

Broe completed a Bachelors in Music Performance from Chapman University where she received a presidential scholarship 1977–1979, a Masters in Fine Arts in Music from California State University, Long Beach in the year 1984, where her masters thesis was An Investigation Of J.S. Bach's Treatment Of The Viola [microfilm]: The Cantatas And The Brandenburg Concertos. She holds a Doctorate in Music in Viola Solo Performance from Arizona State University. Broe is the author of the book “The String Compositions of Louise Lincoln Kerr: Analysis and Editing of Five Solo Viola Pieces”. Arizona State University, Tempe, 2001.

In addition to being a biographer of Louise Lincoln Kerr, she also nominated Kerr for Arizona Women's Hall of Fame which was accepted in 2004. Broe is also reported to have worked on the "Arizona Profiles" CD project and has published several articles on music.

Broe taught violin and viola at two notable colleges. She taught violin and viola and was also the Symphony Conductor at Glendale Community College from 1993 to 1995. She was the founding orchestra Conductor at Paradise Valley Community College from 1993 to 2003. She was the Viola Instructor at the Paradise Valley Community College from 2003 to 2013, and the violin instructor from 2003 to 2005.

In July 2021, Broe's first book Fifty Famous Composers, For Kids Of All Ages was published by Inkwell Books. The book has won MOM's Choice Gold Award in 2021. In June 2022, the International Book Awards announced that the book was honored with the "Finalist" Award in two categories: "History - General" and "Performing Arts" in their 2022 competition.

In 2023, Fifty Famous Composers for Kids Of All Ages won the Book Excellence Award.

== Publications ==
- "A Compendium of Women Viola Composers". American Viola Society. Volume 39, No. 1, March 2023.
- "The Viola Music of Louise Lincoln Kerr" American Viola Society Journal, 11/ 2012
- “Women Viola Composers”, American String Teachers Association Journal, 2007.
- “The Life and Music of Louise L. Kerr,” International Association of Women Musicians Journal: Winter 2004, 4 pgs. CD Review of Marga Richter’s music in IAWM 2005.
- "The String Compositions of Louise Lincoln Kerr; Analysis and Editing of Five Solo Viola Pieces." Arizona State University, Tempe: 254 pg. 2001.
- “Women Viola Composers Before 1800,” The Australian and New Zealand Viola Society Journal, No. 10 Dec. 1998, pgs. 23-27. Reprinted by the Canadian Viola Society in 1999.
- “Conversations with Kievman”, American String Teacher Journal: Winter, 1992, Vol. XLII, No. 1, pg. 74-76. It was reprinted in 50th year anniversary issue in 1996.
- "J.S. Bach’s Treatment of the Viola: In His Cantatas and Brandenburg Concertos". California State University, Long Beach, California: 250 pages, 1984.

=== CD releases (produced and/or performed on) ===
- "Arizona Profiles: The Music of Louise Lincoln Kerr" CD Four Seasons Orchestra, released 2012 AZ for the Arizona Centennial Legacy Projects.
- "The Four Seasons String Quartet "Wedding Album" CD released in 1996 and 2007.
- "Vivaldi A Due Voci" CD released in 2001 Isola Jones and Eileen Mager Sopranos.
- "Vivaldi Festival 2000 Highlights" CD Demo Four Seasons Orchestra released in 2000.
- "Just Wishing On the Moon" CD by Miles From Nowhere released in 1999, the track "Overture to A Lonely Heart" with Four Seasons Orchestra

== Books authored ==
- Waters Broe, Carolyn. Fifty Famous Composers, For Kids Of All Ages. N.p. 248, Inkwell Books LLC, 2021.

== Awards ==
Broe holds several awards for her performances and works:

- The Dream Catcher Award of 1995
- Marquis' Who's Who of Women 2001
- The Phoenix Office of Arts and Culture "Artist Award" in 2005
- Universal Who's Who of 2012
- Mom's Choice Gold Award - November 2021.
- International Book Awards - 2022 (History General).
- International Book Awards - 2022 (Performing Arts).
- Book Excellence Award - 2023.
