= Palma School =

Location
- 919 Iverson Street; Salinas, (Monterey County), California 93901; United States; 36°39′57″N 121°39′51″W

Information
- Type: Private
- Motto: "Palma Merenti" (Palms to the Victor)
- Religious affiliations: Catholic; Congregation of Christian Brothers
- Established: 1951
- President: Chris Dalman
- Principal: David Sullivan
- Grades: 6–12
- Gender: Coeducational
- Enrollment: 632 (2008)
- Colors: Red and Gold
- Athletics conference: CIF – Central Coast Section
- Team name: Chieftains
- Accreditation: WASC WCEA
- Tuition: $16,000.67 (High School), $9,350 (Junior High)
- Website: http://palmaschool.org

Palma School is a grade 6–12 Catholic school located in Salinas, California, United States. Located in the Diocese of Monterey, its motto is "Palma Merenti," which translates in English as "Palms to the Victor."

== History ==
Palma School was founded in 1951 through the efforts of Monsignor Thomas J. Earley and dedicated laypeople, including Joseph Piini and Lloyd Stolich. Their collective dream of Catholic secondary education was realized in September, 1951 when Palma opened its doors to boys and girls as a co-institutional school. The boys were instructed and have continued to be instructed by the Congregation of Christian Brothers. The Christian Brothers, known internationally as Catholic educators, were founded in 1802 by Brother Edmund Ignatius Rice, who was beatified in Rome on October 6, 1996; his feast day has been set as May 5. His goal was to give the youth of his time a unique Christian education. Palma continued to operate as a co-institutional school for thirteen years when, in 1964, a separate facility for girls was opened a few blocks away. At that time, Palma became an all-boys school, and the Christian Brothers assumed administration of the entire facility. A chapel was built in the front of the school in 2003. It has been named the Brother Edmund Rice Chapel. The students and staff use it to enhance the religious education program at Palma School. On May 19, 2022, a building dedication ceremony honoring Brother Patrick Dunne took place, declaring the former multipurpose building "Brother Dunne Hall". In 2024 Palma returned to its co-institutional roots and began accepting girls beginning in the 2024-2025 school year.

Palma is located one block away from its sister school, Notre Dame High School, a Catholic all-girls school.

== Sports ==
The football and basketball programs have won state titles. The 2023 football team's CIF Division 4-A state championship was the first for a Monterey County high school since the CIF State Football Playoffs were created in 2006. Palma defeated Mission Oak (Tulare) 42-19 in the state title game in Pasadena. The 1992 basketball team's CIF Division IV state championship was a first for a Monterey County high school since the CIF State Basketball Playoffs were established in 1981. Palma defeated Lincoln (San Diego) 55-54 in the state title game in Sacramento. The football, basketball and cross country teams have won NorCal and Central Coast Section championships. The golf program has risen, garnering a fourth-place finish in the 2008 CIF State Championships.

Football Championships

- CAA: 1959, 1961,1962, 1963, 1965
- MTAL: 1970, 1984, 1985, 1986, 1987, 1988, 1989, 1990, 1991, 1992, 1993, 1994, 1995, 1996, 1997
- MBL: 1998, 1999, 2000, 2001, 2012, 2013, 2014, 2015, 2016
- T-CAL: 2003, 2004, 2005, 2006, 2008, 2009, 2010
- Pacific Coast-Gabilan: 2018, 2022, 2025
- Central Coast Section: 1989, 1990, 1991, 1992, 1993, 1997, 1998, 2000, 2001, 2003, 2011, 2023 (Division III)
- NorCal: 2023 (Division 4-A)
- State: 2023 (Division 4-A)
- State (rankings based): 1992 (Division III)

Basketball Championships

- CAA: 1964, 1967
- MTAL: 1968, 1970, 1971, 1972, 1973, 1974, 1984, 1985, 1988, 1991, 1992, 1997, 1998
- MBL: 1986, 1987, 2000, 2015, 2016, 2017
- T-CAL: 2007, 2008, 2009, 2010, 2012
- Pacific Coast-Gabilan: 2020, 2025
- Central Coast Section: 1988, 1992, 1993, 1997, 1999, 2000, 2007
- Central Coast Section, Region IV: 1974
- NorCal: 1992 (Division IV), 1993 (Division IV), 2016 (Division IV)
- State: 1992 (Division IV)

== Notable alumni ==
- Wells Adams—Class of 2002, television and radio host and personality; ABC's The Bachelorette (American season 12) and Bachelor in Paradise (American season 3); married to actress Sarah Hyland
- Jonathan Bomarito—Class of 2000, professional race car driver
- Jamaree Bouyea—Class of 2017, University of San Francisco; NBA — Miami Heat (2023), Washington Wizards (2023—)
- Chris Dalman—Class of 1988, Stanford University; NFL — offensive lineman for the San Francisco 49ers (Super Bowl XXIX) 1993–1999; assistant offensive line coach for the Atlanta Falcons 2005–2006; offensive line coach for the Stanford Cardinal; President of Palma School
- Drew Dalman—Class of 2017, NFL player for the Atlanta Falcons
- David Esquer—Class of 1983, Stanford University, head baseball coach for the Cal Bears 2000–2017; Pacific-10 Conference coach of the year (2001); head baseball coach of the Stanford Cardinal baseball team (2018–present)
- David Fales—Class of 2009, San Jose State University; NFL quarterback — Chicago Bears (2014–2016), Miami Dolphins (2017–2018), New York Jets (2019–2020)
- Tom Fanoe—Class of 1964, MBA from Haas School of Business at the University of California, Berkeley; past president of Levi Strauss & Co.'s Levi's USA and president of Joe Boxer
- Michael Gasperson—Class of 2000, University of San Diego; NFL — wide receiver for the Philadelphia Eagles (2006–2007)
- Orlando Johnson—Class of 2007, UC Santa Barbara; NBA — Indiana Pacers (2012–2014), Sacramento Kings (2014), Austin Spurs (2014–2015, 2017), also played overseas
- Peter Lauritson—Class of 1970, film and television producer and director, notably of the Star Trek franchise
- Brian Reader—Arena Football League quarterback, director of football operations at the University of Idaho
- Michael Rianda—Class of 2002, Academy Award nominated writer and director with Sony Pictures Animation, The Mitchells vs. The Machines
- E.J. Rowland—Class of 2001, pro basketball player, Bulgarian national team
- Elliot Vallejo—Class of 2002, signed as an undrafted free agent by the Arizona Cardinals; retired from NFL in 2010

== See also ==
- Edmund Ignatius Rice
