= Craig Adams (ice hockey) =

Bruneian-Canadian ice hockey player

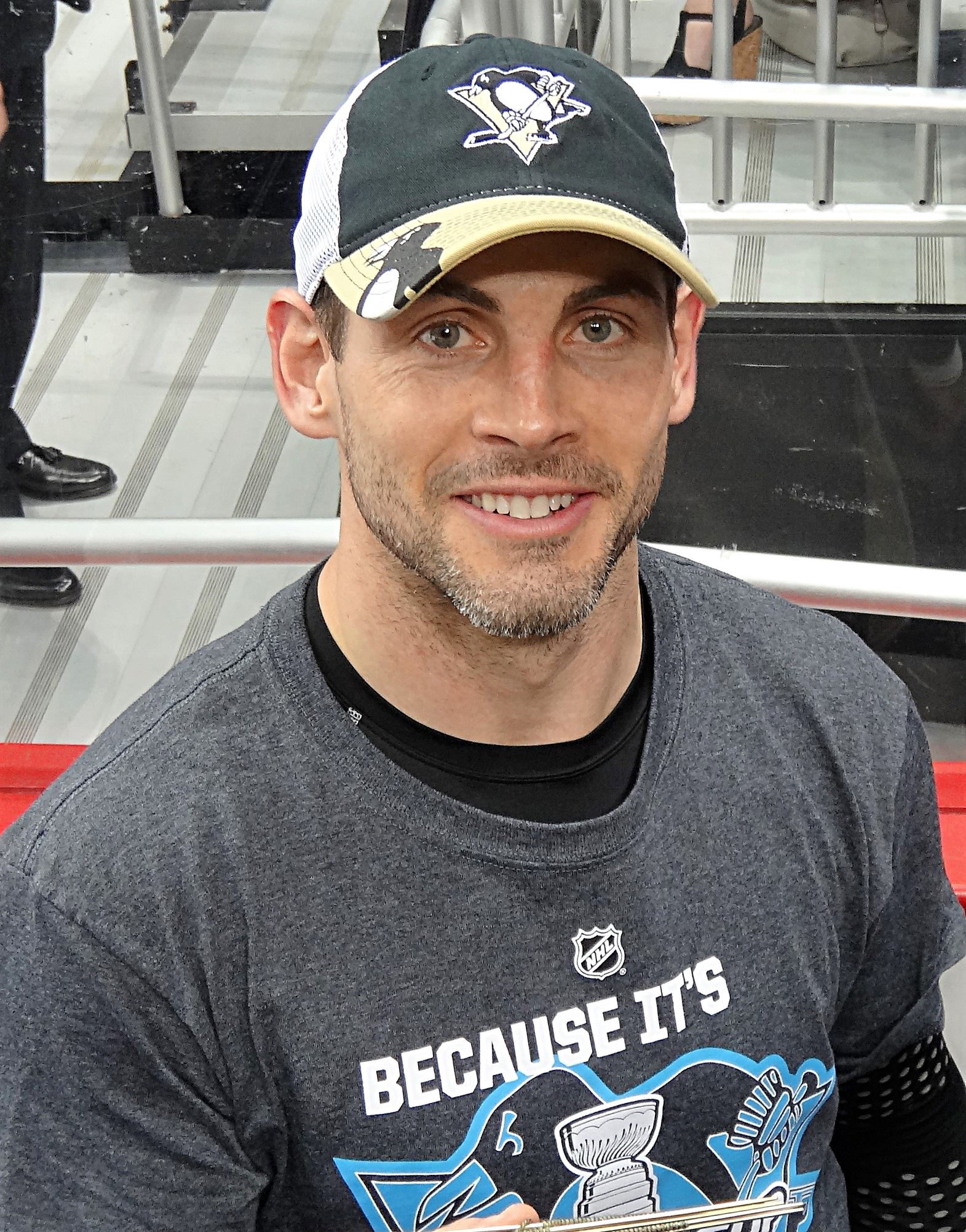
- Adams in 2013
- Born: April 26, 1977 (age 49) Seria, Brunei
- Height: 6 ft 0 in (183 cm)
- Weight: 200 lb (91 kg; 14 st 4 lb)
- Position: Right wing
- Shot: Right
- Played for: Carolina Hurricanes; Chicago Blackhawks; Pittsburgh Penguins
- NHL draft: 223rd overall, 1996; Hartford Whalers
- Playing career: 1999–2015

Craig Daniel Adams (born April 26, 1977) is a Bruneian-born Canadian former professional ice hockey player, who most recently played with the Pittsburgh Penguins of the National Hockey League. Adams was born in Seria, Brunei, but was raised in Calgary, Alberta, residing and playing hockey in the community of Lake Bonavista. Adams is a two-time Stanley Cup winner, winning with the Carolina Hurricanes in 2006 and the Pittsburgh Penguins in 2009.

== Playing career ==
=== Amateur ===
Adams was selected in the 9th round, 223rd overall, in the 1996 NHL entry draft by the Hartford Whalers where he gained the distinction of being their last draft pick. Adams was drafted after his freshman season at Harvard University. He suffered a season-ending shoulder injury on December 27, 1997 in a game against the University of Wisconsin–Madison.

=== Carolina Hurricanes ===
During the 2000–01 season, Adams would make his NHL debut on October 24, 2000 in a 3-2 loss against the San Jose Sharks with the Carolina Hurricanes, who had relocated from Hartford since drafting him. On November 10, 2000, Adams would score his first NHL goal and point against goaltender Glenn Healy in a 3-1 victory over the Toronto Maple Leafs. This goal would be the only point he would get the entire season, playing in a total of 44 games.

During the 2001-02 season, Adams would split time between the Carolina Hurricanes and their American Hockey League (AHL) affiliate the Lowell Lock Monsters. In the NHL, Adams would, for the second season in a row, finish the season with a single point.

In the following two seasons however, Adams would find his footing, finishing the seasons with 18 and 17 points respectively. During the 2004-05 NHL lockout, Adams would sign with the Milano Vipers in Italy, where he would score 29 points in 30 games in the regular season before scoring 11 points in 15 games in the postseason, helping the Milano Vipers win the championship.

On August 25, 2005 he signed a contract with the Mighty Ducks of Anaheim, but was traded back to the Hurricanes on October 3, a few days before the 2005–06 NHL season began. Adams would once again split time between the Hurricanes and the Lowell Lock Monsters. The Carolina Hurricanes would make the playoffs, defeating the Montreal Canadiens, New Jersey Devils, and Buffalo Sabres to secure their spot in the Stanley Cup Finals. Carolina would face the Edmonton Oilers in a series that would go to a game 7, which the Hurricanes would win, giving Adams his first Stanley Cup victory. By winning the Stanley Cup, Adams became the first Bruneian-born player to have his name engraved on the trophy.

During the 2007-08 season, Adams would continue to struggle, only scoring 5 points in 40 games. On December 19, 2007, Adams was suspended for 2 games for high-sticking Toronto Maples Leafs player Alex Steen. Adams would play 40 games that season before being traded to the Chicago Blackhawks.

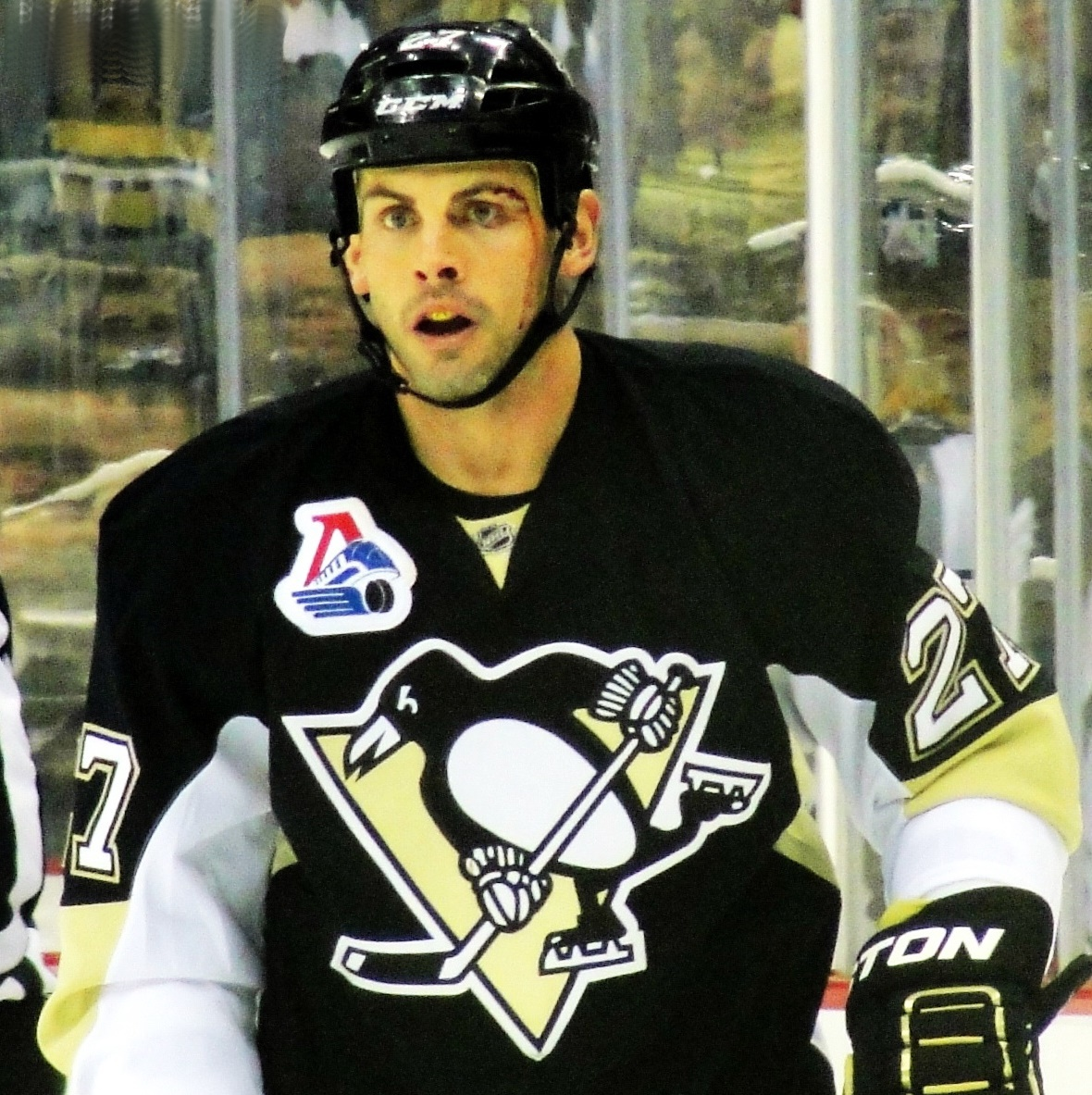
Adams with the Penguins in 2011.

=== Chicago Blackhawks ===
On January 17, 2008 Adams was traded to the Chicago Blackhawks for a conditional pick in the 2009 NHL entry draft. On March 4, 2008, Adams would score his first goal on the Chicago Blackhawks in a 4-2 victory over the Minnesota Wild. On March 4, 2009, the Pittsburgh Penguins claimed Adams off of waivers when the Blackhawks attempted to send him to the AHL.

=== Pittsburgh Penguins ===
After only playing 9 games in the regular season for the Penguins, Adams would play in 24 games in the playoffs, where he would help Pittsburgh win the Stanley Cup against the Detroit Red Wings, giving Adams his second Stanley Cup win. On June 29, 2009, Adams was re-signed by the Penguins to a two-year contract.

On June 9, 2011, Adams was re-signed by the Penguins to another two-year contract.

On July 5, 2013, Adams was re-signed again to a two-year contract. At the beginning of the 2013–14 season, on October 3, 2013, Adams scored the 50th goal of his career against Cory Schneider of the New Jersey Devils.

On April 29, 2015, after seven seasons within the organization, Adams was informed by the Pittsburgh Penguins that he would not be re-signed to another contract. On January 26, 2016, after a 14-year career, Adams announced his retirement.

== Personal ==
Adams was the first NHL player to be born in Brunei. He was born in the country, as his father was an employee of Shell Oil at the time of his birth. The family settled in Calgary, Alberta shortly afterwards. He attended Strathcona Tweedsmuir School for high school.

Adams is married since 2003 to his wife Anne Cellucci, a daughter of the late Paul Cellucci, former Governor of Massachusetts and US Ambassador to Canada. They have three children.

Adams now works as a financial advisor for hockey players at Merrill Lynch in Boston. He has pledged his brain to research on the effects of CTE.

== Career statistics ==
=== Regular season and playoffs ===
			Regular season					Playoffs
Season	Team	League	GP	G	A	Pts	PIM	GP	G	A	Pts	PIM
1993–94	Calgary Buffaloes AAA	AMHL	—	—	—	—	—	—	—	—	—	—
1994–95	Calgary Canucks	AJHL	40	14	24	38	82	—	—	—	—	—
1995–96	Harvard University	ECAC	34	8	9	17	56	—	—	—	—	—
1996–97	Harvard University	ECAC	32	6	4	10	36	—	—	—	—	—
1997–98	Harvard University	ECAC	12	6	6	12	12	—	—	—	—	—
1998–99	Harvard University	ECAC	31	9	14	23	53	—	—	—	—	—
1999–00	Cincinnati Cyclones	IHL	73	12	12	24	124	8	0	1	1	14
2000–01	Cincinnati Cyclones	IHL	4	0	1	1	9	1	0	0	0	2
2000–01	Carolina Hurricanes	NHL	44	1	0	1	20	3	0	0	0	0
2001–02	Lowell Lock Monsters	AHL	22	5	4	9	51	—	—	—	—	—
2001–02	Carolina Hurricanes	NHL	33	0	1	1	38	1	0	0	0	0
2002–03	Carolina Hurricanes	NHL	81	6	12	18	71	—	—	—	—	—
2003–04	Carolina Hurricanes	NHL	80	7	10	17	69	—	—	—	—	—
2004–05	Milano Vipers	ITA	30	15	14	29	57	15	4	7	11	26
2005–06	Lowell Lock Monsters	AHL	13	4	3	7	20	—	—	—	—	—
2005–06	Carolina Hurricanes	NHL	67	10	11	21	51	25	0	0	0	10
2006–07	Carolina Hurricanes	NHL	82	7	7	14	54	—	—	—	—	—
2007–08	Carolina Hurricanes	NHL	40	2	3	5	34	—	—	—	—	—
2007–08	Chicago Blackhawks	NHL	35	2	4	6	24	—	—	—	—	—
2008–09	Chicago Blackhawks	NHL	36	2	4	6	22	—	—	—	—	—
2008–09	Pittsburgh Penguins	NHL	9	0	1	1	0	24	3	2	5	16
2009–10	Pittsburgh Penguins	NHL	82	0	10	10	72	13	2	1	3	15
2010–11	Pittsburgh Penguins	NHL	80	4	11	15	76	7	1	0	1	2
2011–12	Pittsburgh Penguins	NHL	82	5	13	18	34	5	0	0	0	19
2012–13	Pittsburgh Penguins	NHL	48	3	6	9	28	15	0	1	1	10
2013–14	Pittsburgh Penguins	NHL	82	5	6	11	46	13	1	1	2	2
2014–15	Pittsburgh Penguins	NHL	70	1	6	7	44	—	—	—	—	—
NHL totals			951	55	105	160	683	106	7	5	12	74
AHL totals			35	9	7	16	71	—	—	—	—	—

== Awards and honours ==
Award	Year
College
All-ECAC Hockey Rookie Team	1995–96
NHL
Stanley Cup champion	2005–06, 2008–09

== Transactions ==
- On June 22, 1996 the Hartford Whalers drafted Craig Adams in the ninth-round (#223 overall) of the 1996 NHL draft.
- On July 31, 2001 the Carolina Hurricanes re-signed restricted free agent Craig Adams to a 2-year contract.
- On May 1, 2003 the Carolina Hurricanes re-signed restricted free agent Craig Adams to a 1-year contract.
- On July 28, 2004 the Milano Vipers (Italy) signed Craig Adams.
- On August 25, 2005 the Mighty Ducks of Anaheim signed free agent Craig Adams to a 1-year contract.
- On October 3, 2005 the Mighty Ducks of Anaheim traded Craig Adams to the Carolina Hurricanes in exchange for Bruno St. Jacques.
- On June 30, 2006 the Carolina Hurricanes re-signed Craig Adams to a 3-year contract.
- On January 17, 2008 the Carolina Hurricanes traded Craig Adams to the Chicago Blackhawks in exchange for a conditional 2009 ninth-round pick (Not exercised).
- On March 4, 2009 the Pittsburgh Penguins claimed Craig Adams off of waivers from the Chicago Blackhawks.
- On June 29, 2009 the Pittsburgh Penguins re-signed Craig Adams to a 2-year contract.
- On June 9, 2011 the Pittsburgh Penguins re-signed Craig Adams to a 2-year/$1.35 million contract.
- On July 5, 2013 Adams was re-signed by the Pittsburgh Penguins to a 2-year, $1.5 million contract.
- On January 26, 2016, Adams announced his retirement from professional hockey at the age of 38, and after 14 seasons in the NHL.
