= Jason Thornberry =

American writer

Jason Thornberry (born 1971) is an American writer and musician. His tenure with the Southern California alternative-punk group Mulch saw them perform 200 times in two years as an unsigned band. In 1999, The Pressure was readying the release of their debut album Things Move Fast, when Thornberry was discovered in a coma after being beaten nearly to death. Four months later, he was released in a wheelchair. Within a year he was walking again, and Thornberry had begun to document the experience. He continued to see therapists, having also temporarily lost the ability to speak, or to use the left side of his body, as a result of the assault.

He returned to school and edited his college newspaper, The Coast Report, along with contributions to The OC Weekly, URB, Mean Street, and more than two dozen print and online music magazines around the world.

Thornberry holds a B.A. from Seattle Pacific University and an M.F.A. from Chapman University.

== Bibliography ==
Journals:

- Adirondack Review
- Afterimages
- ALAN Review
- Antonym
- Apricity Magazine
- Bicoastal Review
- Bookends Review
- Broadkill Review
- Coachella Review
- Decadent Review
- Dillydoun Review
- Door is a Jar Literary Magazine
- Entropy
- Harbor Review
- Hash Journal
- Helix Literary & Art Magazine
- In Parentheses Literary Magazine
- JMWW Journal
- Letters Journal
- Linden Review
- Litro Magazine
- Los Angeles Review of Books
- Maryland Literary Review
- Maudlin House
- North Dakota Quarterly
- Olivetree Review
- Open: Journal of Arts & Letters
- Phantom Kangaroo
- Poet’s Choice
- Poor Yorick Literary Magazine
- Praxis Magazine for Arts and Literature
- Rejection Letters
- Response
- Rougarou: Journal of Arts & Literature
- Route 7 Review
- Sledgehammer Literary Journal
- Soundings East
- South Florida Poetry Journal
- TAB: The Journal of Poetry & Poetics
- Thimble Literary Magazine
- Welter
- World Literature Today

Magazines:

- American Music Press
- The Blacklist
- Capable Magazine
- Central Circuit
- Flipside
- Litro Magazine
- Mean Street
- Mic Stand Magazine
- Response
- Resurrection Magazine
- Skratch
- Sleet
- Uncomfortable Revolution
- URB

Newspapers:

- Coast Report
- Orange County Weekly
- The Stranger

Online:

- Alternative Zine (Israel)
- Americore
- AMZ Music Zine
- Aversion
- Beat The Blizzard (UK)
- Bendies
- Bite Me!
- Blistering (Canada)
- Buzzine
- California Pop
- CanEHdian (Canada)
- Chaos Control Digizine
- Chaotic Critiques
- Cosmik Debris
- Crud (UK)
- Daily Vault
- Dissident Voice
- Geek America
- Gepetto
- Global Hip Hop
- Hybrid Magazine
- Inkblot
- Legion (Russia)
- Maelstrom
- Mavis's Dream
- Metal Crypt
- Metal UK (UK)
- Mic Stand Online
- Misfit City (UK)
- Open Up & Say
- Pandomag
- Punk News
- Rivative
- Rockezine
- 60 Seconds
- Sweet Tea (UK)
- 2Walls
- Vivid Hues

== Discography ==
(This list includes musical artists with whom Thornberry appeared.)

The Pressure

- My Heart Was Lost (1996).
- The Pressure (1997).
- I Wanna Call Someone (1998).
- v/a Brother Can You Spare Some Ska Vol. 4 (1998).
- v/a Al's Bar Compilation, Vol. 2 (1998).
- v/a Styzine Compilation (1998).
- v/a The Buddy List (1999).
- Things Move Fast (1999).
- v/a Orange County Weekly compilation (1999).
- v/a Sampler WE 20.0 (2002).

Mulch

- Nowhere to Climb (1994).
- 13 Dayz (1995).
- Aces and Spaces (2008).
- Organic Recordings from Wrightwood's Mulch (2015)
