= Four Seasons Orchestra =

Orchestra in Scottsdale, Arizona

- Chamber orchestra
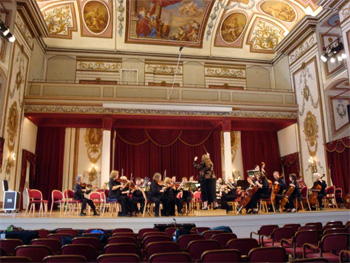
- Four Seasons Orchestra performing at Schloss Esterházy in Austria for Haydn's Bicentennial festival in 2009
- Founded: 1991
- Location: Scottsdale, Arizona
- Principal conductor: Carolyn Waters Broe
- Website: www.fourseasonsorchestra.org

Four Seasons Orchestra is a Scottsdale, Arizona-based chamber orchestra founded by the conductor, composer, violist and writer Carolyn Waters Broe in 1991.

== History ==
=== 1990s ===
The orchestra was founded in 1991 by Carolyn Waters Broe and started with its first performance in January 1992 at Phoenix Civic Center with an audience of 2,000 people at the first MLK Arts and Education Concert on Arizona's first Martin Luther King Jr. Day. The orchestra started performing regularly in the Phoenix metropolitan area. The orchestra has been reported to consist of 25 to 30 members.

In 1992, the Four Seasons Orchestra and Indian Women in Progress performed the Native American play The Indians Discover Columbus of Jefferson Award-winning storyteller Jean Chadhuri for the 500th anniversary of Native American Hospitality Day (also known as Columbus Day). The world premiere of Carolyn Broe's Rebirth of the Goddess and an Arizona premiere of Native American composer Brent Michael Davids' Indian Overture for flute and orchestra were also given.

=== 2000s ===
The Four Seasons Orchestra performed at a 9-11 tribute concert in 2002 at the St. Joan of Arc Catholic Church as well as gave the world premieres of Tucson composer Thomas Woodson's Fanfares for the Fallen Heroes and the Victims of 9-11.

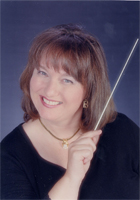
Carolyn Waters Broe

The Four Seasons Orchestra was nominated for the Governor's Arts Award in 2003 and 2004 for Arts Education and Community Service. In 2005, the orchestra gave the Phoenix premiere of Gwyneth Walker's Bassoon Concerto as part of their Baroque and Classical Women Composer's Concert in downtown Phoenix at the Trinity First Episcopal Church. This concert was funded in part by a grant from the Phoenix Office of Arts and Culture.

The Four Seasons Orchestra toured to Austria in 2009 for the Haydn Bicentennial Festival. The orchestra performed the European premiere of ASU Professor Catalin Rotaru's transcription of Haydn's Cello Concerto in C for Double bass with Rotaru as the soloist. They gave the world premiere of Rotaru's transcription of Haydn's concerto at a concert in Phoenix before leaving for Europe. The orchestra also performed the European premiere of Arizona composer Louise Lincoln Kerr's Enchanted Mesa for orchestra and soprano at the Konzerthaus, Vienna, on that concert.

=== 2010s ===
In 2012, the Four Seasons Orchestra was granted official Arizona Centennial Legacy Project status by the Arizona Historical Foundation in 2012 for Arizona Profiles CD of Louise Lincoln Kerr's chamber music. This was the first CD ever recorded of Kerr's music. It is now in a time capsule at the Arizona State Library Archives, which will be opened in one hundred years on February 14, 2112, for the bicentennial of Arizona as a state.

They performed a Spanish Concert in 2013 featuring works by Classical Spanish composers and composers who were inspired by Spanish music. The Four Seasons Orchestra featured Los Angeles guitar solo artist Christopher Carelli performing Rodrigo's Concierto de Aranjuez on that occasion. This concerto is rarely performed in the Phoenix area due to its difficulty level. Carelli was a protege of Angelo Romero.

In 2015, the orchestra performed their Vivaldi Four Seasons concert featuring five young solo artists, three of whom were from ASU, performing all four of his Four Seasons concertos. In January 2018, the Four Seasons Orchestra gave their Mozart, Chopin & Friends Concert featuring three young solo artists and the Rice Brothers. Johnny and Chris Rice performed Chopin's piano concertos on a nine-foot Steinway grand piano. They also performed Mozart's Sinfonia Concertante transcribed for two cellos. Tyler Clifton-Armenta performed Mozart's Clarinet Concerto. Rina Kubota performed Mozart's Violin Concerto in G, and Audrey Wang performed Hoffmeister's viola concerto. The orchestra was given a grant from the General Consulate of the Republic of Poland in Los Angeles for performing Chopin's music in Arizona.

The Four Seasons Orchestra has performed for the Ambassador's Ball in Phoenix numerous times hosted by various consulates in Arizona and delivered numerous notable performances around the world with positive reviews.

== Recordings ==
- Arizona Profiles: The Music of Louise Lincoln Kerr, 2012

== Music directors, conductors ==
- Carolyn Waters Broe (principal conductor)

=== Notable past conductors ===
- Arthur Weisberg – conducted debut in January 1992
- Sir Boris Brott of Canada
- Eleanor Johnson – with her North Valley Chorale for a Vivaldi concert

== Grammy nominations ==
In 2000, the Four Seasons Orchestra was nominated in two Grammy Award categories; "Best Small Ensemble" and "Best New Composition".
