= Mark R. Shepherd =

American politician (1953–2011)

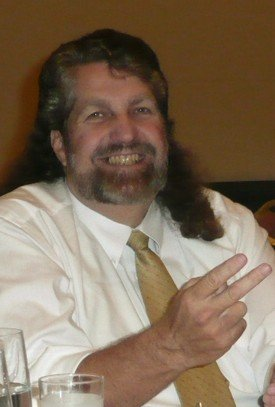

Personal details
- Born: December 5, 1953 Fresno, California
- Died: April 17, 2011 (aged 57) Redlands, California
- Party: Democratic
- Occupation: Politician

Mark R. Shepherd (December 5, 1953 – April 17, 2011) was a political consultant, strategist, activist, environmentalist and radio personality in California. He was a Congressional Field Representative for California's 46th Congressional District from May 2002 to October 2008. Active in Inland Empire Democratic Party politics, Shepherd was twice chairman of the San Bernardino County Democratic Central Committee and longtime officer of the Democratic Luncheon Club of San Bernardino and other local organizations. He served as a member of the Environmental and Progressive Caucus of the California Democratic Party, was a delegate to the California State Democratic Conventions from 1993 through 2010 and also served as an officer with the Native Sons of the Golden West. In the 2000s, Shepherd worked as a consultant for The Nature Conservancy focusing on preservation of the Mojave Desert. From December 2010 to his death four months later he hosted the weekly "Political Hour" program on KCAA radio where he showcased local politics and the work of local activists.

== Career ==
Mark Shepherd was born in Fresno, California, and his family later moved to San Bernardino. He studied political science at Chapman University, spending a year traveling the world with Chapman's World Campus Afloat program. He went on to do graduate work in human services at California State University, San Bernardino. He served as a speaker and social worker with the Redlands Yucaipa Guidance Clinic and was proud of his work with at-risk youth.

Representative Joe Baca, D-Rialto—Shepherd's boss for six years—credited Shepherd with reuniting the local Democratic party after a decade-long rift. "He's totally dedicated his whole life to building the Democratic Party," Baca said. "That was his family.". Shepherd championed the rights and interests of the "little people" and worked hard to protect union jobs.
