= Michael Gasperson =

American football player (born 1982)

No. 19
- Position: Wide receiver

Personal information
- Born: June 10, 1982 (age 44); Monterey, California, U.S.
- Listed height: 6 ft 4 in (1.93 m)
- Listed weight: 220 lb (100 kg)

Career information
- High school: Palma (Salinas, California)
- College: San Diego
- NFL draft: 2005: undrafted

Career history
- Philadelphia Eagles (2005–2007); → Cologne Centurions (2006)
- Stats at Pro Football Reference

Michael Gasperson (born June 10, 1982) is an American former professional football player who was a wide receiver in the National Football League (NFL). He played for the Philadelphia Eagles for one season in 2007. He was signed by the Eagles as an undrafted free agent in 2005. He played college football for the San Diego Toreros.

== Early life ==
Gasperson was a four-sport letterman at Palma High School in Salinas, California and earned the school's Outstanding Senior Athlete award in his senior year. In addition to playing baseball, basketball and soccer as a kid, he was also a competitive swimmer.

== College career ==
Gasperson played college football at the University of San Diego under former San Francisco 49ers head coach Jim Harbaugh. In 2002, Gasperson received first-team All-Pioneer Football League honors after hauling in a team-high 57 receptions for 907 yards and 10 touchdowns. During a 2002 regular season game against Valparaiso Gasperson set a school and conference record with five touchdowns.

Over three seasons, Gasperson accounted for 116 receptions, 1,894 yards, and 17 touchdowns. He was named to the Sports Network's I-AA Mid-Major All-America Team in 2004. He also earned team MVP honors.

== Professional career ==
After being undrafted in the 2005 NFL draft, Gasperson was signed by the Philadelphia Eagles as a free agent. A big-bodied receiver, Gasperson spent the majority of the 2005 season on the Eagles' practice squad before being allocated to play for the Cologne Centurions in NFL Europe that following spring.

After spending time playing for Cologne, Gasperson returned to the United States to continue his involvement with the Eagles during the 2006 and 2007 seasons. On December 19, 2007, Gasperson was promoted to the Eagles' active roster. This came after injuries were suffered by Matt Schobel and L. J. Smith.

Gasperson's regular season NFL debut came against the New Orleans Saints in week 16; the Eagles defeated the New Orleans Saints 38–23. Gasperson recorded one incomplete pass after dropping a ball thrown to him in the flat by Donovan McNabb in the game. Later in the game Gasperson caught, and downed, a punt for the Eagles.

On January 2, 2008, Gasperson was re-signed to a three-year contract with the Eagles. He was released during final cuts on August 30, 2008, after he used up his remaining practice squad eligibility the previous season. He had a workout with the Seattle Seahawks on September 9, 2008.
