= Brian Reader =

American football player (born 1989)

Louisville Cardinals
- Title: Quality control coach

Personal information
- Born: May 24, 1989 (age 37); Santa Cruz County, California, U.S.
- Listed height: 6 ft 3 in (1.91 m)
- Listed weight: 220 lb (100 kg)

Career information
- Position: Quarterback
- High school: Palma (Salinas, California)
- College: Idaho
- NFL draft: 2012: undrafted

Career history

Playing
- Iowa Barnstormers (2013–2014); New Orleans VooDoo (2015)

Coaching
- Idaho (2015–2016) Graduate assistant; Idaho (2019) Running backs coach; Idaho (2020) Wide receivers coach; Idaho (2021) Offensive coordinator & wide receivers coach; Northern Colorado (2022) Running backs coach; Louisville (2023–present) Quality control coach

Operations
- Idaho (2017–2018) Director of football operations

Awards and highlights
- Coast Conference Off. Player of the Year (2008)

Career AFL statistics
- Comp. / Att.: 210 / 376
- Passing yards: 2,622
- TD–INT: 50–17
- Passer rating: 92.09
- Rushing TD: 3
- Stats at ArenaFan.com

Brian Miles Reader (born May 24, 1989) is an American former football quarterback. He was signed by the Iowa Barnstormers as an undrafted free agent in 2013. He played college football at University of Idaho.

== College career ==
=== Arkansas and JuCo ===
Reader began his college career in 2007, as a preferred walk-on for the Arkansas Razorbacks. He redshirted for the Razorbacks and ran the scout team offense. When Houston Nutt departed from Arkansas for Ole Miss, Reader decided to transfer to Monterey Peninsula College. While at Monterey Peninsula, Reader assumed the starting quarterback role, and guided the Lobos to a 10–0 regular season record and a Coast Conference championship. He was named the Coast Conference Offensive Player of the Year.

=== Idaho ===
After not landing a scholarship from any other Football Bowl Subdivision teams, Reader committed to the University of Idaho on February 5, 2009. As a sophomore in 2009, Reader was named the backup to Nathan Enderle. Reader started back-to-back games as a sophomore against Fresno State and Boise State, both losses for the Vandals.

In 2010, Reader played in 10 of the Vandals' 13 games as a backup to Enderle.

As a senior in 2011, with Enderle gone to graduation, Reader was named the Vandals starting quarterback out of fall practice. Reader started the Vandals' first eight games of the season before losing his starting position to Taylor Davis.

=== College career statistics ===
Idaho Vandals
Season	Passing							Rushing			
Season	Comp	Att	Yards	Pct.	TD	Int	QB rating	Att	Yards	Avg	TD
2009	47	81	801	58.0	6	6	150.7	14	17	1.2	1
2010	42	71	568	59.2	5	1	146.8	10	-26	-2.6	0
2011	192	354	1,974	54.2	10	12	103.6	48	-18	-0.4	0
Career	281	506	3,343	55.5	21	19	117.2	72	-27	-0.4	1

== Professional career ==
=== Iowa Barnstormers ===
On February 3, 2013, Reader was assigned to the Iowa Barnstormers of the Arena Football League (AFL). Reader spent almost the entire the 2013 season as the backup quarterback to J. J. Raterink. It wasn't until the Barnstormers Week 17 game against the Utah Blaze, when Reader made his first career start.

Reader had his rookie option picked up by the Barnstormers in 2014, where he backed up quarterback Carson Coffman.

=== New Orleans VooDoo ===
On October 7, 2014, Reader was assigned to the New Orleans VooDoo. When starting quarterback Adam Kennedy was injured during the VooDoo's week 4 game, Reader became the starting quarterback.

== Coaching career ==
In 2015, Reader joined his alma mater, Idaho, as a graduate assistant. In 2017, he was promoted to director of football operations. In 2019, he joined the on-field coaching staff as the running backs coach. For the spring 2021 season that was delayed due to COVID-19, he transitioned to the wide receivers coach. In the fall 2021 season, he was promoted to offensive coordinator while retaining his role as wide receivers coach.

In 2022, Reader was hired as the running backs coach for Northern Colorado.

After one season with Northern Colorado, Reader was hired as a quality control coach for Louisville.
