= Chris Dalman =

American football player and coach (born 1970)

No. 50, 67
- Positions: Center, guard

Personal information
- Born: March 15, 1970 (age 56); Salinas, California, U.S.
- Listed height: 6 ft 3 in (1.91 m)
- Listed weight: 287 lb (130 kg)

Career information
- High school: Palma (Salinas)
- College: Stanford
- NFL draft: 1993: 6th round, 166th overall pick

Career history

Playing
- San Francisco 49ers (1993–2000)

Coaching
- Salinas (CA) Palma HS (2001–2004) (asst.); Atlanta Falcons (2005–2006) (asst. OL); Stanford (2007–2008) (OL); Salinas (CA) Palma HS (2009–present) (OL)

Awards and highlights
- Super Bowl champion (XXIX); Second-team All-Pac-10 (1992)

Career NFL statistics
- Games played: 105
- Games started: 64
- Fumble recoveries: 3
- Stats at Pro Football Reference

Christopher William Dalman (born March 15, 1970) is an American former professional football player who was an offensive lineman for seven seasons with the San Francisco 49ers of the National Football League (NFL) from 1993 to 2000. He played college football for the Stanford Cardinal.

== Early life and college ==
Dalman was born March 15, 1970, in Salinas, California, to William Dalman and Janet (Johnson) Dalman. He was an offensive/defensive tackle for Palma High School in Salinas, graduating in 1988. He was a four-year football letter-winner at Stanford University. Dalman is notable in that he is one of the few players to successfully undergo spinal fusion and return to the playing field, having undergone the surgery between his sophomore and junior years at Stanford. While an undergraduate at Stanford he became a member of Delta Tau Delta fraternity. He graduated with a Bachelor's degree in Political Science in 1992.

== Professional playing career ==
Drafted in the sixth round (166th overall) in the 1993 NFL draft by the San Francisco 49ers, Dalman started 64 games in seven seasons with the 49ers. He first started all 16 regular season games in 1996. He was part of the Super Bowl XXIX Champion team in 1995.

== Coaching career ==
After playing in the National Football League, he went back to Palma in 2001 to become an assistant football coach and English teacher. After a stint as the assistant offensive line coach for the Atlanta Falcons from 2005 to 2006, he became the offensive line coach and running game coordinator at Stanford until resigning in January 2009 to become varsity offensive line coach at Palma and the Director of Admissions.

== Post-football career ==
Dalman currently is the president of Palma School in Salinas, California, appointed July 2020. He was most recently assistant principal and dean of students at the school from 2015 to 2020.

== Personal life ==
Dalman is married to Yanne, an elementary school teacher.

They have two children, Kate and Drew. Drew played football at Palma School and Stanford University. He was selected by the Atlanta Falcons in the 4th round of the 2021 NFL draft. Kate is the operations and recruiting assistant for the Stanford football program.
