= Elliot Vallejo =

American football player (born 1984)

No. 68
- Position: Offensive tackle

Personal information
- Born: May 17, 1984 (age 42); Monterey, California, U.S.
- Listed height: 6 ft 7 in (2.01 m)
- Listed weight: 315 lb (143 kg)

Career information
- College: UC Davis
- NFL draft: 2007: undrafted

Career history
- Arizona Cardinals (2007–2009); Oakland Raiders (2009–2010)*
- * Offseason or practice squad member only

Awards and highlights
- First-team All-GWFC (2006); Second-team All-GWFC (2005)

Elliot Louis Vallejo [vuh-LAY-ho] (born May 17, 1984) is an American former football offensive tackle. He was signed by the Arizona Cardinals as an undrafted free agent in 2006. He played college football at UC Davis. He retired from the National Football League in 2010, received his Master's in Systems Engineering and now works as a Systems Engineer at Key Technology.

== Early life ==
Vallejo played football while at Palma High School in Salinas, California. He was also a member of the wrestling and track & field teams.

== College career ==
Vallejo played at UC Davis. He transferred there from UCLA in 2002. He received his B.S. in Materials Sciences and Engineering.

== Professional career ==
=== Arizona Cardinals ===
Vallejo signed a free agent contract on April 30, 2007 with the National Football League's Arizona Cardinals, but was released the following training camp. He signed with the Cardinals' practice squad on September 3, 2007, and was re-signed to the team on December 31, 2007.

In 2008, Vallejo made the 53 man roster before being released and signed the practice squad on November 26. Vallejo was activated from the practice squad on December 19 when Clark Haggans was placed on injured reserve.

Vallejo suffered a fractured kneecap during training camp in August 2009. He was waived/injured on August 26 and subsequently reverted to injured reserve. He was released with an injury settlement on September 3.

=== Oakland Raiders ===
Vallejo was signed to the Oakland Raiders' practice squad on December 14, 2009. He was released on December 22. He retired with the Oakland Raiders on June 8, 2010.
