= Tilden Smith =

- Born: Southern California, U.S.
- Education: Chapman University
- Occupations: Co-CEO and co-founder, International Pet Solutions

Tilden Smith is a CEO and co-founder of pet product company, International Pet Solutions, which he helped found in fall of 2009. Since the inception of IPS, Smith and his business partner created the company's first product, the PetLawn, an indoor outhouse for pets. In the past year since PetLawn's introduction on the market, The PetLawn is now on the shelf in over 130 stores throughout the United States and Canada. Smith graduated in 2012 from Chapman University, majoring in Business Administration with an emphasis in Entrepreneurship.

in Spring 2011, Smith and his business partner were first-place winners in Chapman University's Argyros School of Business & Economics annual business competition. In addition to receiving a 1st-place winner plaque, Smith and his business partner received mentoring from an angel investor who gave advice on business strategy.

In August 2011, Smith and his company were featured in Forbes magazine's article on Student Entrepreneurs. Tilden was one of nine students chosen from colleges across the United States. All 9 entrepreneurs met together in Austin, Texas prior to the publication of the feature article and participated in a round-table discussion with Michael Dell, CEO and Founder of Dell Inc. During Smith's interview with Forbes, he announced that International Pet Solutions would be introducing new products to the market that fall and updating PetLawn's design.

Smith was awarded the title of one of "The Hottest 25 People in Orange County" in the November 2011 issue of OC Metro magazine. For the past 21 years the editors of OC Metro have selected the "Hottest 25" movers and shakers and most influential people in Orange County. Smith and his company were featured in the December 2011 issue of Entrepreneur Magazine, "Undergrads Clean Up With an 'Indoor Outhouse' Business for Pets". Smith and his company were featured in Inc. Magazine in March 2012 and a 2012 winner of Inc. Magazine's "America’s Coolest College Start-Ups 2012".

Smith's products are now in nearly 200 U.S. stores and have expanded into Canada, Panama and Venezuela.
