= Louise Lincoln Kerr House and Studio =

Historic site in Scottsdale, Arizona

- U.S. National Register of Historic Places
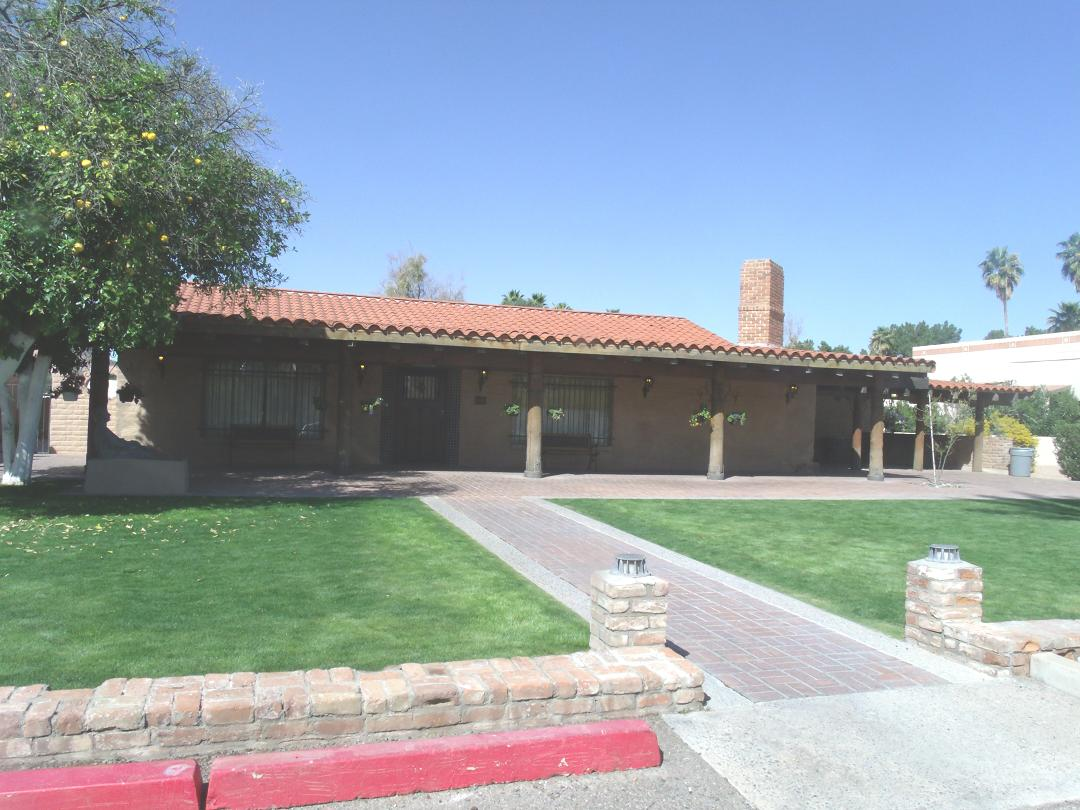

- Location within Arizona Location within the United States
- Location: 6110 N. Scottsdale Rd., Scottsdale, Arizona
- Coordinates: 33°31′34″N 111°55′37″W
- Area: 0.5 acres (0.20 ha)
- Built: 1948–1969
- Architect: Louise Lincoln Kerr, J. Fredrick Fleenor
- Architectural style: Late 19th And 20th Century Revivals, Mission/Spanish Revival
- NRHP reference No.: 10000173
- Added to NRHP: April 14, 2010

The Louise Lincoln Kerr House and Studio (also referred to as the Kerr Cultural Center) is a facility in Scottsdale, Arizona, owned and operated by Arizona State University. It was originally the house of Louise Lincoln Kerr and was willed to the university upon her death in 1977.

In 2010, it was listed on the National Register of Historic Places.

== History ==
=== Louise Lincoln Kerr ===
Louise Lincoln was born in Cleveland in 1892. She learned the piano and viola from her mother and then studied at Barnard College in New York.

She married Peter Kjer in 1936 (the family name was changed to Kerr) and had eight children. One of them had a respiratory condition, which prompted the family to move to Phoenix in 1936. She bought 47 acres of land in Scottsdale along Lincoln Drive, named for her father. After Peter died three years later, Louise returned to writing music. She also was a benefactor of musical institutions in the Valley, including the Phoenix Symphony and the ASU School of Music. Other musical societies met at her house, including the Phoenix Chamber Music Society and National Society of Arts and Letters.

The Kerr studio was Scottsdale's premier music venue until the Scottsdale Center for the Arts opened in 1975.

=== Under the university ===
Upon Kerr's death on December 10, 1977, Arizona State University's College of Fine Arts (now the Herberger Institute for Design and the Arts) received the property, and in 1981, management of the center passed from the College of Fine Arts to Gammage Memorial Auditorium. The transfer also involved further renovations to the site, including a lighted parking lot, new furnace and air conditioning units for the house, and code compliance work. Further changes were made in 1988, primarily involving re-roofing the studio and repairing the walls.

== Architecture ==
The five-room house was constructed in 1948. It is of a Spanish Colonial style and is made of adobe that was made and built on the property. On the north end of the east wall is a simple ramada, and the southeast corner of the house features a wooden staircase that provides access to the flat roof. The entry doors were carved out of sugar pine by Tucson artist Charles Bolsius, a friend of Kerr. The windows are plain squares with brick windowsills and oversized wooden lintels.

The studio was completed in 1959 to the north of the house, with an addition on the west end finished in 1969. Featuring the same natural adobe bricks as the house, the studio is covered by a low-pitched roof that flattens out further to cover the patios on the west and east sides. The studio features exposed rafters and a brick chimney at one corner. Bolsius carved the entry doors for the studio; the main east entry is surrounded by a doorframe featuring empty beer bottles set into the brick. The 1969 expansion was completed by architect Fred Fleenor and included built-in seating for 100, improved lighting, and kitchen and restroom facilities; special attention was paid to making this addition match the rest of the building. The floor tiles are exceptionally rare today; they are made of a mixture of cement and white marble dust.

Also on the property were several cottages, nicknamed "The Shacks"; guests including Pablo Casals, Isaac Stern and the Budapest String Quartet stayed in these cottages. They were removed sometime between Kerr's death in 1977 and the construction of the Marriott Renaissance Scottsdale resort in 1979–1980.

== Current use ==
The Kerr Cultural Center still sees regular use, in part due to its intimate setting and also because it is commonly regarded as the best venue for chamber music in the Phoenix area. It is used as a venue for musical performances as well as small conferences and private parties.
