= Peter Jonas =

Peter Jonas may refer to:

- Peter Jonas (footballer) (born 1959), Australian rules footballer and coach
- Sir Peter Jonas (director) (1946–2020), British opera director
- Peter Jonas (figure skater) (born 1941), Austrian figure skater
- Peter Jonas (physiologist), German neurophysiologist
