= Tiquette Bramlett =

American winemaker

- Born: California
- Citizenship: United States
- Education: Chapman University
- Occupation: Winemaker
- Known for: Founder of Our Legacy Harvested

Tiquette Bramlett is an American winemaker and founder of the nonprofit organization Our Legacy Harvested. She is the first black woman appointed to oversee a winery in a major U.S. wine region. Bramlett was named as one of USA Today's Women of the Year in 2023.

== Early life and education ==
Bramlett grew up in the San Francisco Bay area. She earned a Bachelor's degree in both Organizational Leadership and Vocal Performance and Education from Chapman University. After graduating, Bramlett was diagnosed with thyroid cancer at the age of 24, which caused her to change her original career plan to become an opera singer. After her mom gave her The Wine Bible to read during treatment, she decided to pursue a career in the wine industry.

== Career ==
Bramlett started as an associate in the tasting room at Anne Amie Vineyards in Carlton, Oregon in 2015. She was later employed as a brand ambassador for Abbey Creek Vineyard in North Plains, Oregon. Bramlett is a certified sommelier.

In 2020, Bramlett established a nonprofit organization called Our Legacy Harvested, whose mission is to diversify the wine industry within Oregon. The association works with interns and trains them on winemaking, working to create opportunities in the industry for other BIPOC individuals.

In 2021, Bramlett was hired as president of Compris Vineyard (formerly Vidon Vineyards) located in Newberg, Oregon, becoming the first black woman to lead a winery in the United States. She has said: “It’s cool being the first, but I want to make sure I’m definitely not the last.”

== Awards and honors ==
In 2021, Bramlett was named one of Imbibe magazine's 75 People to Watch.

In 2023, Bramlett was named as one of USA Today's Women of the Year, which recognizes women who have made a significant impact across the country.
