= Nicholas Graham =

Canadian fashion designer and entrepreneur (born 1958)

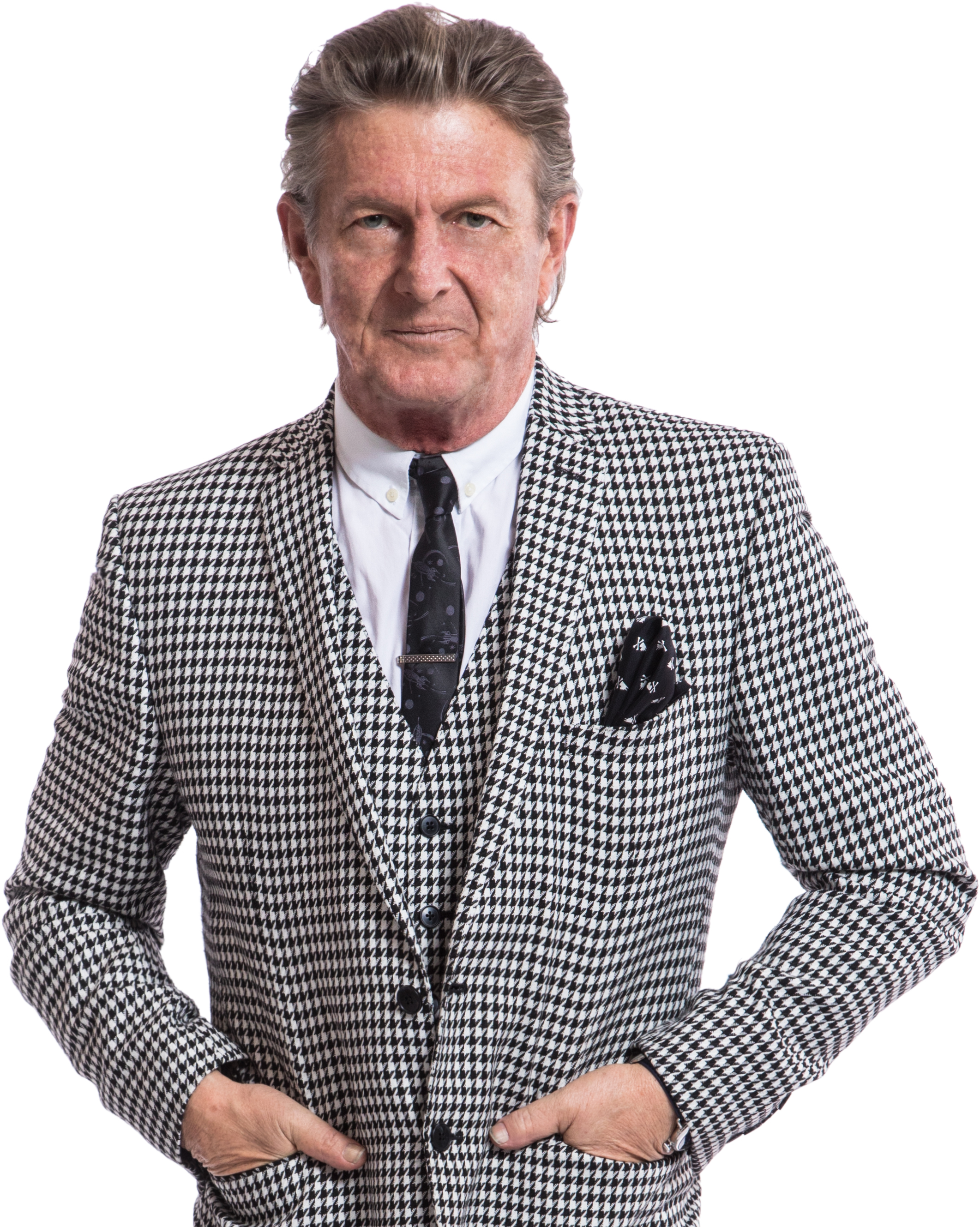
- Born: February 25, 1958 (age 68); Calgary, Alberta, Canada
- Education: Strathcona-Tweedsmuir School
- Occupation: Fashion designer
- Spouse(s): Maria Goldinger (divorced); Margaret Graham (divorced)
- Children: 2
- Website: nickgraham.com

Nicholas Graham (born February 25, 1958) is a Canadian fashion designer, marketer and entrepreneur. Graham founded Joe Boxer in 1985, and is the founder and CEO of the Nick Graham menswear line, and of the SpaceOne lifestyle brand.

== Early life and education ==
Nick Graham was born in Calgary, Alberta, to English immigrants Ewen and Monica Graham. Graham is the third of four siblings. He attended Trinity College School in Port Hope, Ontario and finished high school at Strathcona-Tweedsmuir School in Okotoks, Alberta. At 16, he bought a sewing machine and taught himself to sew. After high school graduation, he spent time traveling in Europe, including six months sewing dresses in Greece; he then moved on to Sweden, where he met and married his first wife, Maria Goldinger.

== Joe Boxer ==
In 1980, Graham and Goldinger moved to San Francisco after a short stint in Vancouver, and began making unique neckties under the name Summ. Macy's was a client and a buyer there suggested that they put their designs on men's underwear; Macy's sold out the first boxer short design in three days and the company Joe Boxer was born. Graham became well known for marketing concepts, such as sending Bill Clinton 100 pairs of boxer shorts on his 100th day in office, creating glow-in-the-dark underwear, and running afoul of the United States Department of the Treasury when he silk-screened $100 bills on boxer shorts. In 1991, Graham was accepted into the Council of Fashion Designers of America.

To facilitate expansion, Graham sold 20% of the company and began licensing its name and designs to other companies, for use on other products. By 1996, Graham stated that annual sales were $50 million. However, after licensing the Joe Boxer name to the New York women's lingerie company Van Mar Inc., Graham launched a competing line of underwear. Van Mar sued and won; the $3.2 million judgement threatened to bankrupt Joe Boxer.

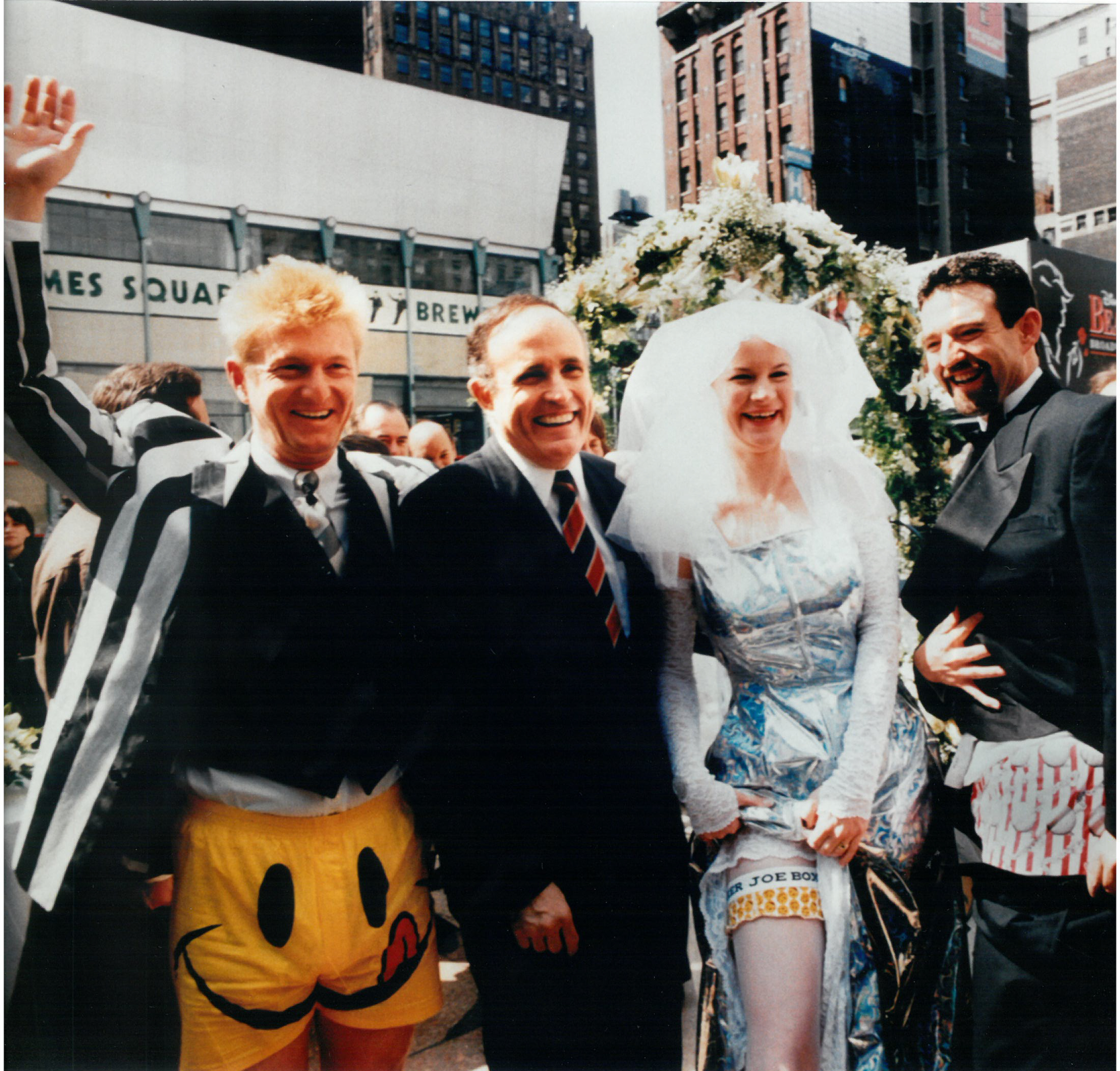
Graham (left) poses with New York City Mayor Rudy Giuliani at the launch of the Kmart deal in 2001

Nine months later, in September 2001, the company was sold to Windsong Allegiance Apparel Group, which signed an exclusive deal with Kmart to sell Joe Boxer products. Graham had not been CEO for some time but had remained a partner; he continued to be involved with the company until 2005, when Joe Boxer was sold to its current owner, Iconix Brand Group. In 2019, Iconix announced that Graham had returned to Joe Boxer as a creative consultant.

== Nick Graham Collection ==
In 2012, Graham moved to New York City and began developing the Nick Graham collection. The brand, which is a division of Tharanco Group, launched online in December 2013, and expanded into department stores in October 2014. The same month Iconix Brand Group invested in the company. The collection provided quality affordable suits, as well as the world's first 3D-printed line of accessories.

With the business downturn brought on by the COVID-19 pandemic, the Nick Graham collection reduced its output to shirts, ties and shoes. In January 2020, Graham launched 'Airband', a face covering brand.

In 2021, Graham launched SpaceOne, a digital apparel outlet with a space-faring aesthetic.

== Other ==
Graham is the author of A Brief History Of Shorts: The Ultimate Guide To Understanding Your Underwear (1995).

In September 2019, Graham debuted a project titled Soundtrack From Films Never Made. Graham performed the production at a New York Fashion Week after-party.

== Awards ==
- International Woolmark Prize (1990, 1991)
- Men’s Fashion Association MARTY Award (1991)
- Golden Shears Award (1991)
- MIRA Award (1992)
- Earnshaw Magazine EARNIE Award for children’s design excellence (1994, 1995)
- CLIO Award (Joe Boxer website, 1995)
