= List of Monterey–Salinas Transit lines =

This is a listing of all of the bus transit routes operated by Monterey–Salinas Transit in Monterey County, California.

== Route numbering ==
- A-C: BRT "Jazz" Routes, Monterey Peninsula
- 01–19: Local routes, Monterey Peninsula
- 20–29: Regional routes, intercity services
- 30–39: Local routes, South County
- 40–49: Local routes, Salinas area
- 50–59: Regional routes, express services
- 60-69: Regional routes, Veteran's Shuttle
- 80–89: Regional routes, Paso Robles
- 90–99: Local routes, Senior Shuttle

In 2020, MST began its Comprehensive Operational Analysis to redesign its route network, seeking to prioritize improved service frequency and travel time. The Final Network Plan was released in February 2022 and multiple routes were discontinued.

== Fixed route network ==
=== Monterey Peninsula Local Lines ===
Line		Inbound Terminal	Outbound Terminal	Places Served	Links
Jazz A	Aquarium–Sand City via Hilby	Aquarium Foam & Irving	Sand City Station	Monterey Bay Aquarium Lighthouse Ave, Monterey Transit Plaza, Monterey Peninsula College, N Fremont St, Hilby St, Oldemeyer Center, Sand City Station	Jazz Schedule and Map (PDF)
Jazz B	Aquarium–Sand City via Broadway	Aquarium Foam & Irving	Sand City Station	Monterey Bay Aquarium, Lighthouse Ave, Monterey Transit Plaza, Monterey Peninsula College, N Fremont St/Blvd, Broadway, Ord Grove, Sand City Station	Jazz Schedule and Map (PDF)
1	Monterey–Pacific Grove via Asilomar	Monterey Transit Plaza	Forest & Prescott	Monterey Transit Plaza, Lighthouse Ave, Monterey Bay Aquarium, Downtown Pacific Grove, Asilomar, David Ave	Route Schedule and Map (PDF)
2	Monterey–Pacific Grove via David Avenue	Monterey Transit Plaza	Forest & Prescott	Monterey Transit Plaza, Lighthouse Ave, Monterey Bay Aquarium, Downtown Pacific Grove, David Ave, Asilomar	Route Schedule and Map (PDF)
5	Monterey- Carmel Rancho via Carmel	Monterey Transit Plaza	Carmel Rancho Shopping Center	Monterey Transit Plaza, Carmel	Route Schedule and Map (PDF)
7	Monterey–Ryan Ranch	Monterey Transit Plaza	Upper Ragsdale & Lower Ragsdale	Monterey Transit Plaza, Monterey Peninsula College, Monterey Courthouse, Monterey Regional Airport, Ryan Ranch Business Park	Route Schedule and Map (PDF)
8	Monterey-CHOMP	Monterey Transit Plaza	Community Hospital of the Monterey Peninsula	Monterey Transit Plaza, Monterey Peninsula College, Glenwood Circle, Del Monte Center, Community Hospital of the Monterey Peninsula	Route Schedule and Map (PDF)
17	Marina-Sand City via General Jim Moore	Marina Transit Exchange	Sand City Station	Marina Transit Exchange, CSUMB, Sand City Station	Route Schedule and Map (PDF)
18	Sand City-Marina via Monterey Road	Sand City Station	Marina Transit Exchange	Sand City Station, CSUMB, The Dunes on Monterey Bay, VA DoD Outpatient Clinic, Marina Transit Exchange	Route Schedule and Map (PDF)

=== Regional Intercity Lines ===
Line		Inbound Terminal	Outbound Terminal	Places Served	Links
20	Monterey–Salinas	Monterey Transit Plaza	Salinas Transit Center	Monterey Transit Plaza, Naval Postgraduate School, Sand City Station, Marina Transit Exchange, Hartnell College, Salinas Courthouse, Salinas Transit Center	Route Schedule and Map (PDF)
23	Salinas–King City	Salinas Transit Center	King City; South First & Pearl	Salinas Transit Center, Chualar, Gonzales, Soledad, Greenfield, King City	Route Schedule and Map (PDF)
23X	Salinas–King City Express	Salinas Transit Center	King City; Mee Memorial Hospital	Salinas Transit Center, Gonzales, Soledad, Greenfield, King City Mee Memorial Hospital	Route Schedule and Map (PDF)
24	Carmel Valley-Crossroads Carmel	Carmel Valley; Rippling River	Crossroads Shopping Ctr	Rippling River, Carmel Valley Village, Mid-Valley Ctr, Carmel Rancho, Crossroads Shopping Ctr	Route Schedule and Map (PDF)
28	Watsonville–Salinas via Castroville	Salinas Transit Center	Watsonville Transit Center	Salinas Transit Center, W. Market, Castroville, Moss Landing, Pájaro, Watsonville Transit Center	Route Schedule and Map (PDF)
29	Watsonville–Salinas via Prunedale	Salinas Transit Center	Watsonville Transit Center	Salinas Transit Center, N. Main, Prunedale, Las Lomas, Pájaro, Watsonville Transit Center	Route Schedule and Map (PDF)

=== South County Local Lines ===
Line		Inbound Terminal	Outbound Terminal	Places Served	Links
34	King City	Third & Lynn	Third & Lynn	Third & Lynn, County of Monterey Social Services, City of King Park, Pools, Golf Course, Salinas Valley Fairgrounds, River Dr., Broadway Circle, San Antonio Park, King City Skate Park, Broadway & San Antonio, King City High School, Robert Stanton Theater, San Antonio Dr.	Route Schedule and Map (PDF)

=== Salinas Local Lines ===
Line		Inbound Terminal	Outbound Terminal	Places Served	Links
41	Salinas-Alisal-Northridge	Salinas Transit Center	Northridge Mall	Salinas Transit Center, East Alisal, Natividad Medical Center, Alvin Dr, Harden Ranch Plaza, Northridge Mall	Route Schedule and Map (PDF)
42	Salinas-Alisal	Salinas Transit Center	Garner & Sanborn	Salinas Transit Center, East Alisal, Garner & Sanborn	Route Schedule and Map (PDF)
43	Salinas–South Salinas via SVH	Salinas Transit Center	S. Main & Plaza Cir.	Salinas Transit Center, S. Main, SVH, Abbott St, Blanco Cir., S. Main & Plaza Cir.	Route Schedule and Map (PDF)
44	Salinas–Westridge	Salinas Transit Center	Westridge Shopping Center	Salinas Transit Center, Housing Authority, Post Office, Laurel West Shopping Center, Westridge Shopping Center	Route Schedule and Map (PDF)
45	Salinas–Creekbridge via East Market	Salinas Transit Center	Independence & Lexington	Salinas Transit Center, E. Market, Sanborn Rd, Creekbridge/Independence & Lexington	Route Schedule and Map (PDF)
46	Salinas–Natividad	Salinas Transit Center	Natividad Medical Center	Salinas Transit Center, Salinas Adult School, Natividad Medical Center	Route Schedule and Map (PDF)
48	Salinas–Northridge via North Main	Salinas Transit Center	Northridge Mall	Salinas Transit Center, N. Main, Municipal Pool, Community Ctr, Laurel St, El Gabilan Library, Harden Ranch Plaza, Northridge Mall	Route Schedule and Map (PDF)
49	Salinas–Santa Rita via North Main	Salinas Transit Center	San Juan Grade at Northridge Way	Salinas Transit Center, N. Main, Municipal Pool, Community Ctr, Laurel St, El Gabilan Library, Harden Ranch Plaza, Santa Rita	Route Schedule and Map (PDF)

=== Regional Express Line ===
Line		Inbound Terminal	Outbound Terminal	Places Served	Links
59	Salinas-Gilroy	Salinas Amtrak Station	Gilroy Caltrain Station	Salinas Amtrak Station, Salinas Transit Center, Prunedale Park & Ride, Gilroy Caltrain Station	Route Schedule and Map (PDF)

=== Veteran’s Shuttle Line ===
Line		Inbound Terminal	Outbound Terminal	Places Served	Links
61	Salinas–VA DOD Clinic	Salinas Transit Center	VA-DOD Clinic	Salinas Transit Center, S. Main, Springtown, East Garrison, Reservation Rd, Marina Transit Exchange, East Campus, Imjin Parkway, The Dunes on Monterey Bay, VA DoD Outpatient Clinic	Route Schedule and Map (PDF)

=== Senior Shuttle Lines ===
Line		Inbound Terminal	Outbound Terminal	Places Served	Links
91	Monterey-Pacific Meadows	Monterey Transit Plaza	Pacific Meadows	Hacendia, Del Mesa, Pacific Medows, Carmel Rancho, Crossroads Shopping Ctr, Crossroads Safeway, Downtown Carmel, Community Hospital of the Monterey Peninsula, Del Monte Center, Monterey Transit Plaza	Route Schedule and Map (PDF)
94	Sand City-Carmel	Sand City Station	Carmel 6th & Mission	Sand City Station, Broadway, Villa Del Monte, General Jim Moore, Hilby, Casanova, Euclid, Monterey Peninsula College, Monterey Transit Plaza, Del Monte Center, Downtown Carmel	Route Schedule and Map (PDF)
95	Williams Ranch-Northridge	Northridge Mall	Sanborn & Boronda	Northridge Mall, Harden Ranch Plaza, Harden Parkway, Boronda Rd, Natividad Rd, Natividad Medical Center, Creekbridge, Sanborn Rd, Alisal Shopping Ctr	Route Schedule and Map (PDF)
96	Salinas–Airport Business Center	Salinas Transit Center	Salinas Airport Business Center	Salinas Transit Center, Abbott St, Schilling Pl, County Government Center, Moffett St, Salinas Airport Business Center	Route Schedule and Map (PDF)

=== Seasonal Trolley ===
These free shuttles operate on a timetable-free loop using coaches styled after turn-of-the-century streetcars.

Line	Operates	Places Served	Links
MST Trolley—Monterey	Operates Daily Memorial Day weekend through Labor Day. Operates Weekends Only from Labor Day-Memorial Day. Trolly also operates in select holidays	Downtown Monterey, Fisherman's Wharf, Cannery Row, Monterey Bay Aquarium	Brochure (PDF)

== Demand responsive and paratransit services ==
=== Demand Responsive service ===
These lines offer custom "dial a ride" service to neighborhoods and shopping areas, and provide timed transfers to MST's regular fixed-route network. Trips may be scheduled by calling a toll-free number at least one hour in advance. Standing daily and weekly appointments may also be made.

Line	Timed Transfer Point	Places Served	Links
MST On Call—South County	Gonzales Center	Entire city of Gonzales	Brochure (PDF)

=== ADA Paratransit service ===
MST Rides is a program offered to those persons who have a disability that prevents them from using MST's regular fixed-route service.
