= Mee Memorial Hospital =

Hospital in King City, California

- Mee Memorial Healthcare System
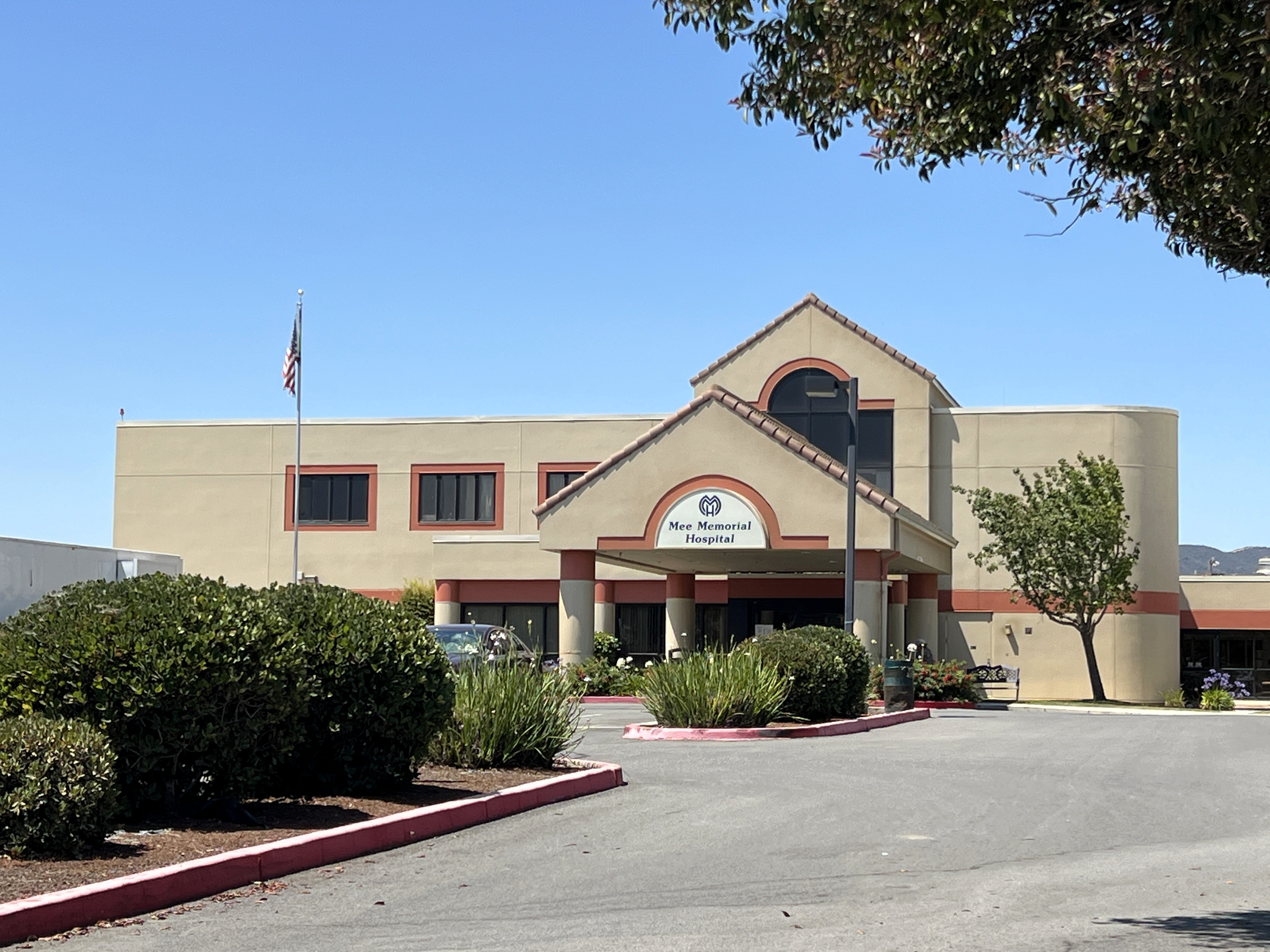

Geography
- Location: 300 Canal St. King City, CA 93930, Monterey County, CA, California, United States
- Coordinates: 36.20648°N 121.13240°W

Organization
- Care system: Private
- Type: Community

Services
- Beds: 73

History
- Founded: 1962

Links
- Website: MeeMemorial.com
- Lists: Hospitals in California

Mee Memorial Hospital is located in King City, California, in Southern Monterey County. Built in 1962, it is named after rancher George L. Mee. The land was donated by Dr. L. M. Andrus who served on the original board of directors. Mee Memorial is the core of the Mee Memorial Healthcare System which includes several clinics servicing the rural community including Greenfield, CA. Mee is the only hospital within a 50-mile radius.

== History ==
In 1960 the projected costs of the 46-bed hospital were one million dollars. A federal-state grant of $600,000 and $300,000 were raised locally. Founder of the (current in 1960) 72-bed, King City Hospital, Dr. L. M. Andrus, donated a six-acre tract on Canal street and bids for construction were opened in December 1960.

Myrtle Mee and Tom P. Mee, widow and son of rancher George L. Mee auctioned off over 400 cows, calves, heifers, yearlings and bulls with the proceeds to be donated for construction of the new Southern Monterey County Hospital in King City, California. The herd, called "Mashed O" had been bred starting in 1949 and was an award-winning herd. The herd was auctioned off in 1960 with the Mee family guaranteeing at least $150,000 towards the construction of the hospital. Tom Mee asked that the hospital be named after his late father George L. Mee, which the board agreed to.

In July 1962 as the hospital neared completion a volunteer auxiliary was organized. An election of officers and orientations on hospital ethics were scheduled in the community. First president of the Auxiliary was Mrs. Emil Meyer, Mrs. Lestr Smart was vice president, Mrs. James V. Pettitt secretary and Mrs. John Turner was appointed treasurer. Dr. Andrus served on the board of directors. Room rates were decided on by the trustees based on comparable rates, $30 for a private room, $24 for a pediatric bed, nursery $8. Comparable rates in California were $34.91 for a private room.

Mee Hospital opened October 1, 1962, transferring patients from the old King City hospital (Southern Monterey County Memorial Hospital) in a maneuver called "Operation Switchover". In preparation for the transition elective surgeries were postponed. The old King City hospital once closed down would be renovated and become a rest home called Pioneer Hacienda.

At the grand opening of the hospital in 1962, the Fort Ord Army band served as the musical entertainment while local dignitaries did the ribbon cutting.

By 1972 the hospital staffed 75 full and part-time employees.

Other Monterey County hospitals, Natividad Medical Center, Salinas Valley Memorial Hospital and Community Hospital of the Monterey Peninsula included Mee Memorial into a regional Medi-Cal managed care health plan in 1998. This would allow the hospitals to "lean on together, instead of competing against each other".

== Post 2000 ==
In 2000 the hospital expanded again, adding additional hospital space, new surgical suite, labor and delivery rooms, a new emergency department, a new main entrance, remodeled skilled nursing rooms and imaging department, expanded beds and added 20,000 square feet of space for future growth. The cost for the new expansion was $9 million and was spurred on because the US Senate required hospitals to meet earthquake safety standards by 2008, the 1962 building did not meet those standards. The 2000 remodel expanded the hospital to 56,000 square feet.

A 2006 expansion project doubled the patient capacity to 130 beds. In the 2000 construction the hospital had been built two-story but until 2006 only the first floor had been used.

The COVID-19 pandemic hit all Monterey County hospitals hard, by May 2020, Mee had laid off 55, reducing staff to about 300 people. Chief medical officer, Dr. Robert Valladares stated that if Mee had stopped elective surgeries "it would have had to close". According to Valladares, Mee does elective surgeries on a smaller scale than the bigger hospitals, "more pain procedures". Stimulus funds from the CARES Act were based on Medicare cost reports so Mee did not receive "near enough stimulus funds".

Vaccinations during COVID were made more challenging because "[M]any are migrant farmworkers of indigenous Mexican heritage who speak neither Spanish or English, but native languages such as Mixteco and Triqui". According to the director of outpatient clinics Heidi Pattison, "[P]roviding interpreter services was instrumental in getting people vaccinated". Over 187 clinics were held to administer vaccines.

== Justice with Health book program ==
Mee physician Joshua Deutsch designed ten children's books called Justice with Health that target farmworker families with illustrations of "characters of indigenous and Latin American descent". The books address nutrition, family relationships, physical activity, and medical descriptions such as "Parts of the Body". Because the books are aimed at communities with low levels of literacy, some of the books are wordless. Written by Deutsch and illustrated by Jess Marie Soriano, the 2021 launch gave out 18,000 books to "Mee Memorial, Natividad Hospital, Alisal clinic and Touro Medical School".

== Mee Memorial Healthcare System ==
- Albert and Donna Oliveira Clinic Greenfield, CA - 467 El Camino Real, Greenfield, CA 93927
- Fisher-Elliott Building - King City Clinic - 210 Canal St, King City, CA 93930
