= Streetcars in Monterey =

Operation
- Locale: Monterey, California
- Open: 1891
- Close: 1923
- Status: Dismantled
Horsecar era: 1891–1903
Track gauge	3 ft 2 in (965 mm)
Propulsion system	Horse
Electric era: 1903–1923
Lines	2
Routes	3
Track gauge	3 ft 2 in (965 mm) (1903–1914); 1,435 mm (4 ft 8 1/2 in) standard gauge (1911–1923)
Electrification	550 V DC
Overview

The streetcar system of Monterey, California, operated between 1891 and 1923. It started as a horsecar line before being electrified in the early 1900s and expanded to its largest extent in the 1910s. Lines extended from Pacific Grove in the east to Del Monte Heights in the east.

== History ==
=== Horsecar operation ===
The Monterey and Pacific Grove Railway opened as a horsecar service. Revenue service began between Oak Grove and the Statue of Junípero Serra on April 30, 1891 after testing the previous day. The right of way was graded allow for trolley operation, though was laid to a narrow gauge of 3 ft 2 in (965 mm). Tracks were extended to the El Carmelo Hotel in August. A further extension to the Southern Pacific Monterey station was completed the following year.

The company contemplated electrification as early as 1893, though a tragedy the following year would postpone those plans. The car barn was largely destroyed in a fire on May 12, 1894; the cause of the blaze or person who started it were never identified. Losses amounted to the building, six cars, hay, and one horse among other equipment. Insurance did not cover these expenses. A new car barn opened the following year with second hand rolling stock acquired from Santa Cruz and the California Street Cable Railroad in San Francisco.

=== Electrification ===
Plans were put forward to electrify the line in 1901, and the Del Monte, Monterey and Pacific Grove Electric Railway was incorporated to acquire the line and carry out the work. Some long term schemes involved connecting the line to Santa Cruz and eventually on to San Francisco. The line was shut down for five weeks beginning in May 1903, reopening with one electric car running on June 12. Tracks along Tyler Street were abandoned as a new extension to the Presidio was to be built. The rebuild was performed with mismatched equipment, with rail weight varying between 20 and 60 pounds per yard (9.9 and 29.8 kg/m) and some trolley wire reportedly reused from scrap.

Around the same time as electrification, the company additionally put forward plans to build a new line to the Ord Barracks in the Presidio, with construction begun by January 1904.

The whole system was converted to standard gauge in 1911 for $30,000.

=== Monterey and Del Monte Heights Railway ===
A new company was formed to build a new line from the DMM&PG eastern terminus to a new development in Del Monte Heights: the Monterey and Del Monte Heights Railway. The new line was planned too late to take advantage of their connecting streetcar system's new standard gauge, so the line was built to the old narrow gauge and operated with a single rebuilt horsecar which was leased from the older streetcar company. Service began on February 21, 1912, though the operation was short lived. Runs ceased after December 31, 1913, resuming the following March until ceasing for good after October 31, 1914.

=== Abandonment ===
Despite parallel bus service being established in 1912, the breakout of war in Europe drove passengers to the Franklin Hill line and the Presidio. After the end of the First World War, the line was shortened slightly to the Presidio gates.

Following the war, conversion to one-man operation was not enough to stymie operating losses, and raising fares was seen as impossible. The State Railroad Commission demanded upgrade works along the line, but the company showed that they were barely making money and could not afford such an expenditure. The city of Pacific Grove had been keen to remove the streetcar tracks from Lighthouse, and lack of payment of the franchise tax allowed them to petition the Superior Court of Monterey County to show the company's forfeiture the franchise. Parallel bus service began in 1922. Service along the Franklin Street hill line was discontinued after the ruling. The Coast Valley Gas & Electric Company (the railroad's parent company since 1914) was purchased by the H.M. Byllesby Engineering and Management Company in November 1923, who made it clear that without profitable operation, the line would be shut down. The last car ran near midnight on December 4.

== See also ==
- Monterey–Salinas Transit — modern transit provider in Monterey and Salinas
