= Mershops Northridge =

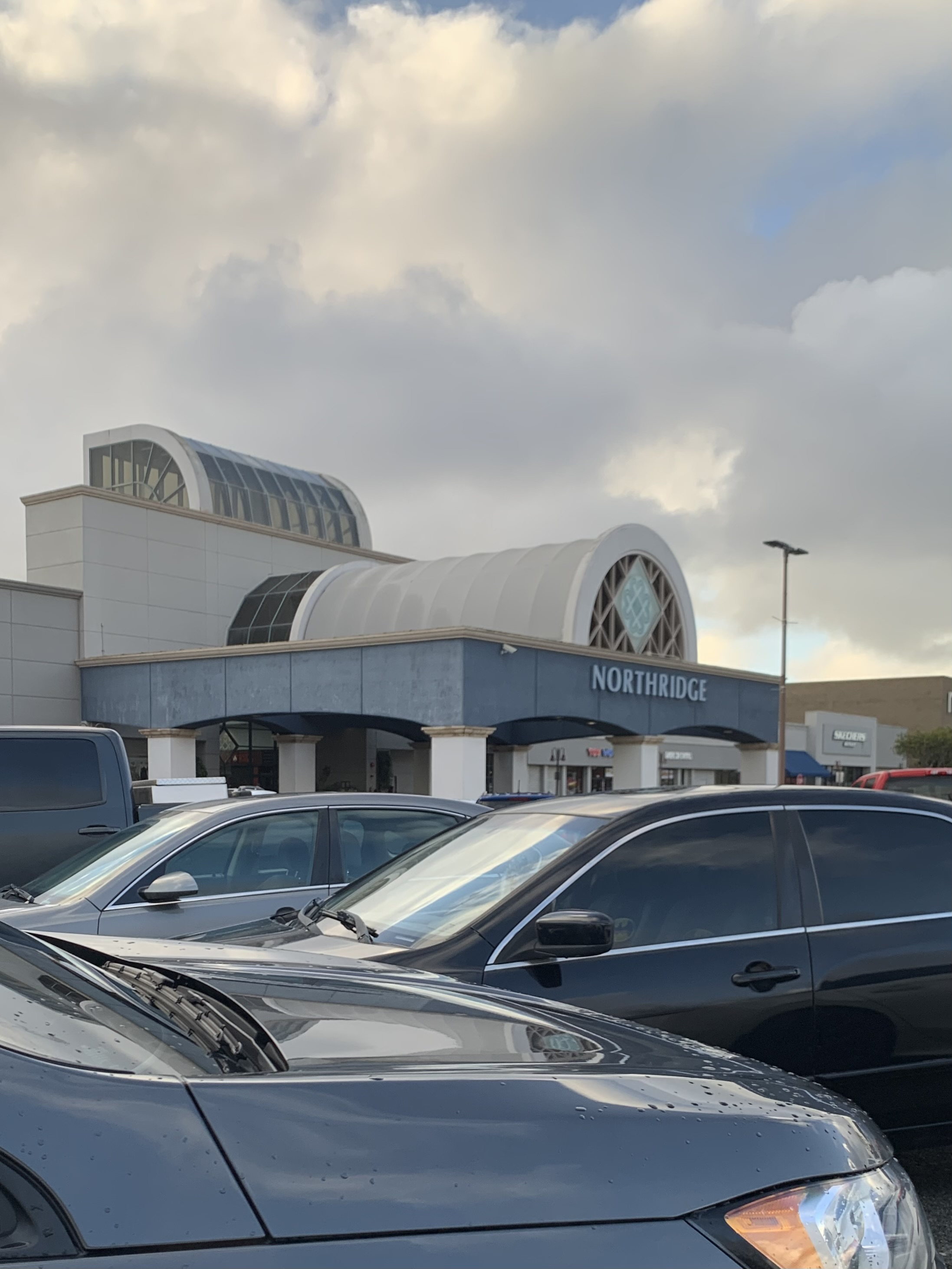
- North Wing entrance of Mershops Northridge
- Location: Salinas, California, United States
- Coordinates: 36.71763°N 121.65803°W
- Address: 796 Northridge Drive
- Opened: 1972; 54 years ago
- Previous names: Northridge Mall (1972 - 2025)
- Manager: Spinoso Real Estate Group
- Owner: Mershops
- Num. of stores: 127
- Num. of anchor tenants: 8
- Floor area: 892,824 sq ft (82,946.1 m^{2})
- Floors: 1 plus 2nd floor access to Round One Entertainment (2 in Macy's and 2 in subdivided anchor space with multiple tenants at south end of mall)
- Parking: 5,800+
- Public transit: Monterey Salinas Transit (MST): 41, 44, 45, 48, 95
- Website: shop-northridge-mall.com

Mershops Northridge, colloquially known as Northridge Mall, is a shopping mall in Salinas, California, United States, and the largest in Monterey County. Located off U.S. Highway 101 near Boronda Road and North Main Street in the northern part of the city, the single-story structure encompasses 976,913 sq ft (90,758 m^{2}) of retail space.

== Features and Stores ==
Mershops Northridge features more than 110 shops, two restaurants, a food court with eight outlets, a Round One Entertainment, and four department stores including Hobby Lobby, JCPenney, Macy's, Burlington (not yet opened), an auto shop known as O’Reilly Auto Parts, an arcade known as Dave & Busters, Gohan AYCE Buffet, and an axe throwing business called Smash n' Axe. It receives approximately 7.2 million visitors annually with approximately 5,800 spaces in the open-air parking lot. It is the only indoor shopping mall between San Jose and Santa Maria.

== History ==
=== Opening, 1980s, and 1990s ===
Northridge Mall opened on October 25, 1972 with 60 stores and Emporium Capwells, JCPenney, and Mervyn's as anchor stores. It was owned by the insurance company Northwestern Mutual. Sears moved from its original South Main Street location to its mall location, which, at the time, was disconnected and was not affiliated with the mall. It was not until the new south wing was added in 1982, that the pre-existing Sears outlet became part of the mall. The new wing also nearly doubled the shopping center's retail space and stores. The resulting addition gave the shopping mall the distinction where one had to enter JCPenney to access one end of the mall to the other while inside.

In 1994 the mall was remodeled and in 1996 the Emporium Capwells outlet was replaced by Macy's; both Sears and JCPenney underwent extensive remodels. In 1998, the Mervyn's outlet was extensively remodeled to incorporate the brand's new image.

=== 2000s and 2010s ===
Macerich acquired Northridge Mall in 2003 from Northwestern Mutual for a purchase price of approximately $128.5 million.

Starwood Capital Group purchased Northridge Mall in 2013 from Macerich for a purchase price of approximately $120 million.

In 2015, Sears Holdings spun off 235 of its properties, including the Sears at Northridge Mall, into Seritage Growth Properties.

On November 4, 2016, JCPenney opened a new 127,000 sq. ft. one-story building on the west side of the mall facing Highway 101. The former building was set to become new mall shops on the first floor which would connect the north and south sections of the mall, finally connecting the two sections to form one continuous corridor. An entertainment complex was set to take over the former second floor of JCPenney. After the relocation of JCPenney, the mall added new seating and new flooring throughout the entire mall.

On March 9, 2019, Round 1 opened as the entertainment center in the former JCPenney's second story. Also, Forever 21 moved from the former Mervyn's anchor building next to JCPenney to a downsized location inside the mall. The former Forever 21 became Hobby Lobby and opened on September 16, 2019.

A Panera Bread location was built detached from the mall which opened in mid 2019. After Panera opened, a new building broke ground, which was set to open as a Chick-fil-A. Chick-fil-A opened on April 8, 2021. On November 14, 2019, it was announced that Forever 21 would be closing as part of a plan to close 111 stores nationwide. The store closed in January 2020.

=== 2020s ===
Sears closed in 2020 due to the COVID-19 pandemic.

In 2022, Northridge Mall was sold to Bridge Group Investments for $93 million.

On May 16, 2024, Burlington announced that they would be opening a new location at the south end of the mall where the old Sears once resided. At the time, renovations were only at early stages. As of July 2025, renovations are underway after they had been halted in August 2024 due to inadequate inspections of the area.

In December 2024, Raising Cane's announced that they would be opening a new location at the mall, while in April 2025, it was reported that the restaurant would be opened in either December 2025 or January 2026. The restaurant opened on November 18, 2025, and is located next to the Big 5 Sporting Goods on the corner of North Main Street and Madrid Street.

In addition to Raising Cane's and Burlington, other businesses slated to open include O'Reilly Auto Parts, Dave & Buster's, Smash n' Axe (an axe throwing business), and Gohan AYCE Buffet, all of which have signed leasing agreements with Ethan Conrad Properties, owner of the old Sears building. The latter four businesses are to be located in the same building as the Burlington, with Dave & Buster's slated to open on the second floor, while the rest of the businesses are slated to open on the first floor. O'Reilly Auto Parts, Gohan AYCE Buffet, and the aforementioned Raising Cane's have already opened.

In August 2025, Northridge Mall rebranded as Mershops Northridge because of Bridge Group Investments rebrand as Mershops, which was a portfolio wide change across all of their properties.

After its location inside the mall closing, Starbucks opened in September, 2026, inside its own building, at the parking lot of Northridge, across from Chick-Fil-A.

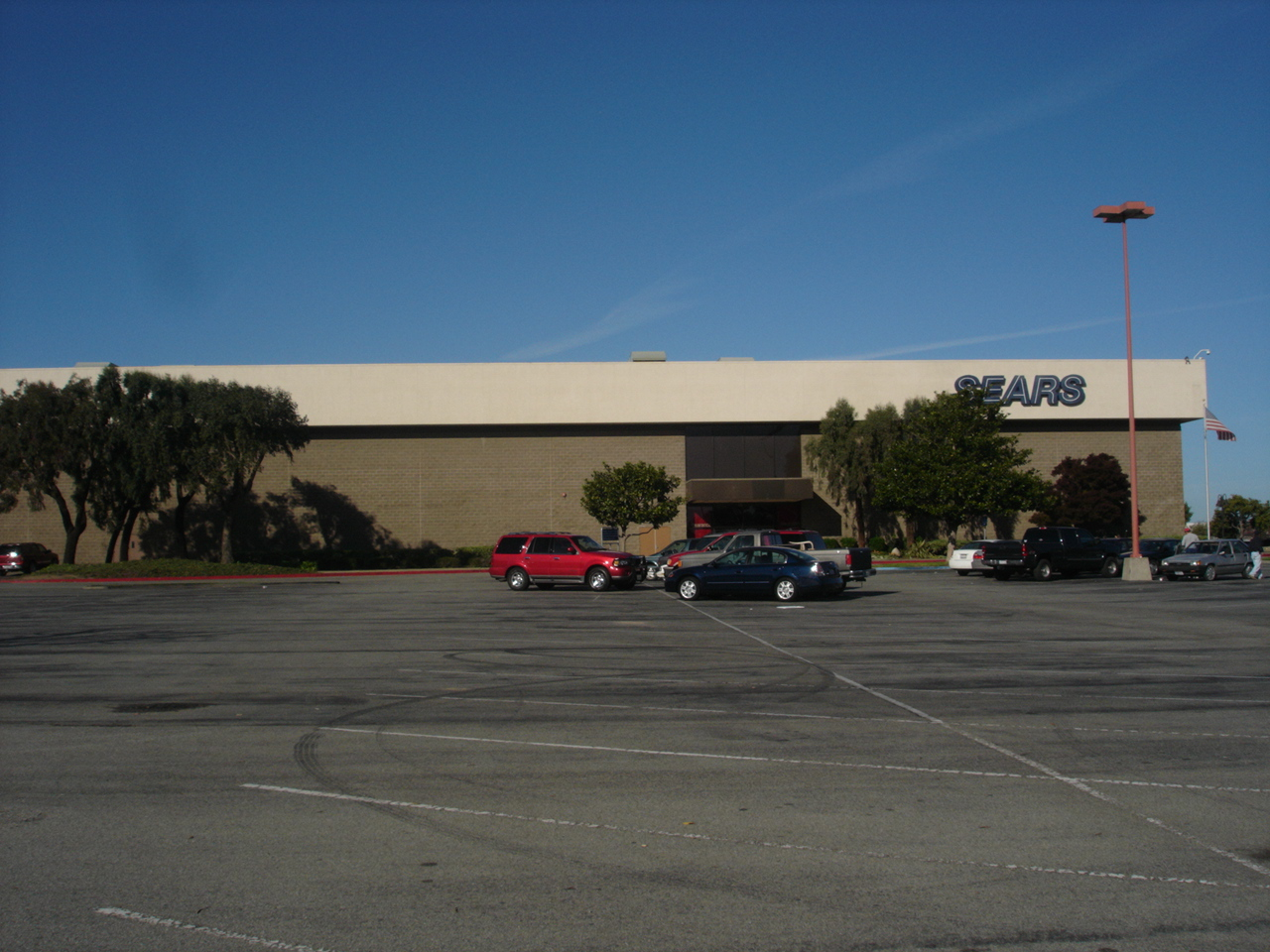
The Sears store, which was incorporated into the mall in 1982, closed in 2020 and is set to become a new Burlington department store, along with other new businesses by 2026.
