= Salinas Valley Health Medical Center =

Medical Center in Salinas, California

- Salinas Valley Health
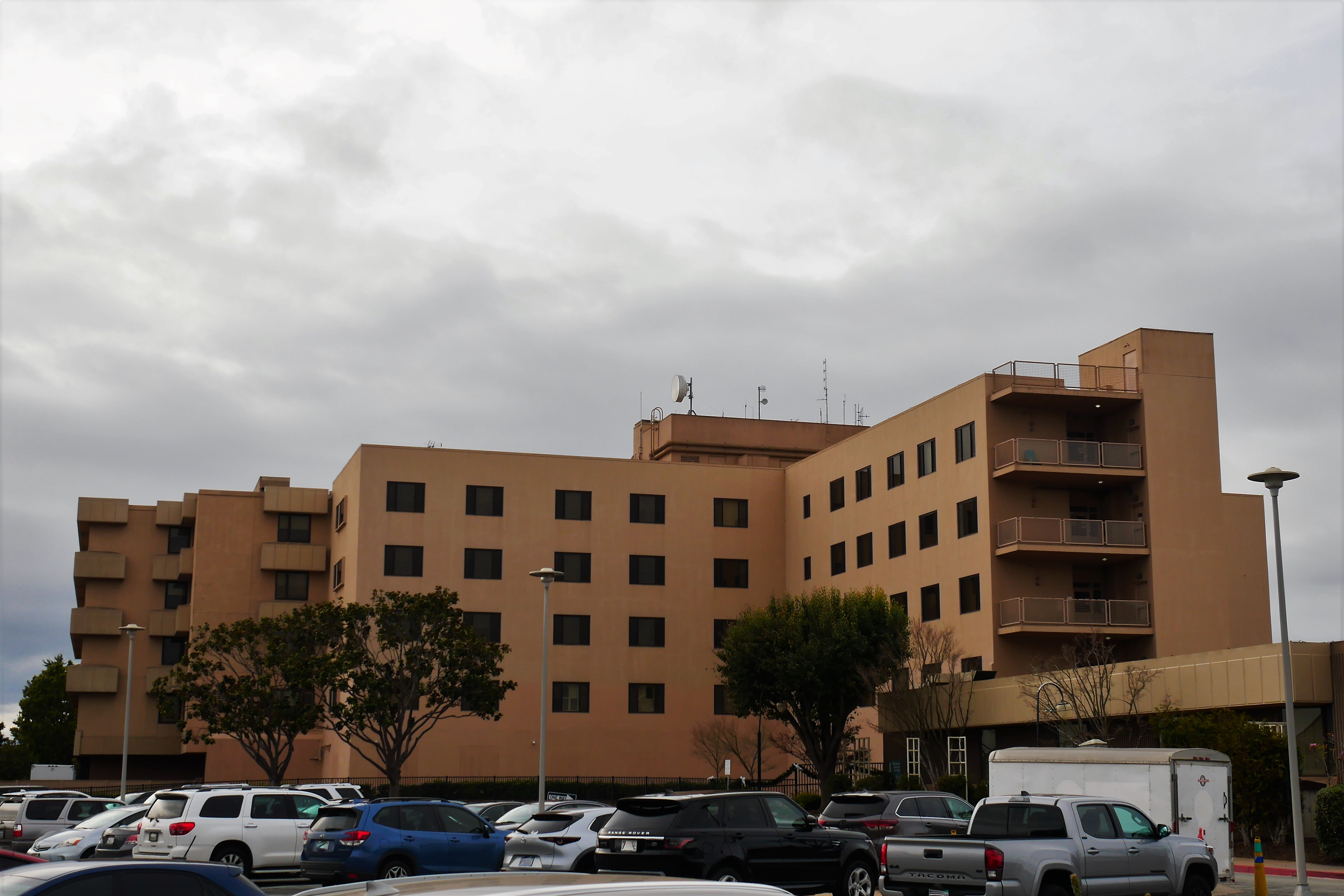

Geography
- Location: 450 East Romie Ln, Salinas, CA 93901, Monterey County, CA, California, United States
- Coordinates: 36.65931°N 121.64594°W

Organization
- Care system: Public
- Type: Community

Services
- Beds: 263

History
- Founded: 1953

Links
- Website: salinasvalleyhealth.com
- Lists: Hospitals in California

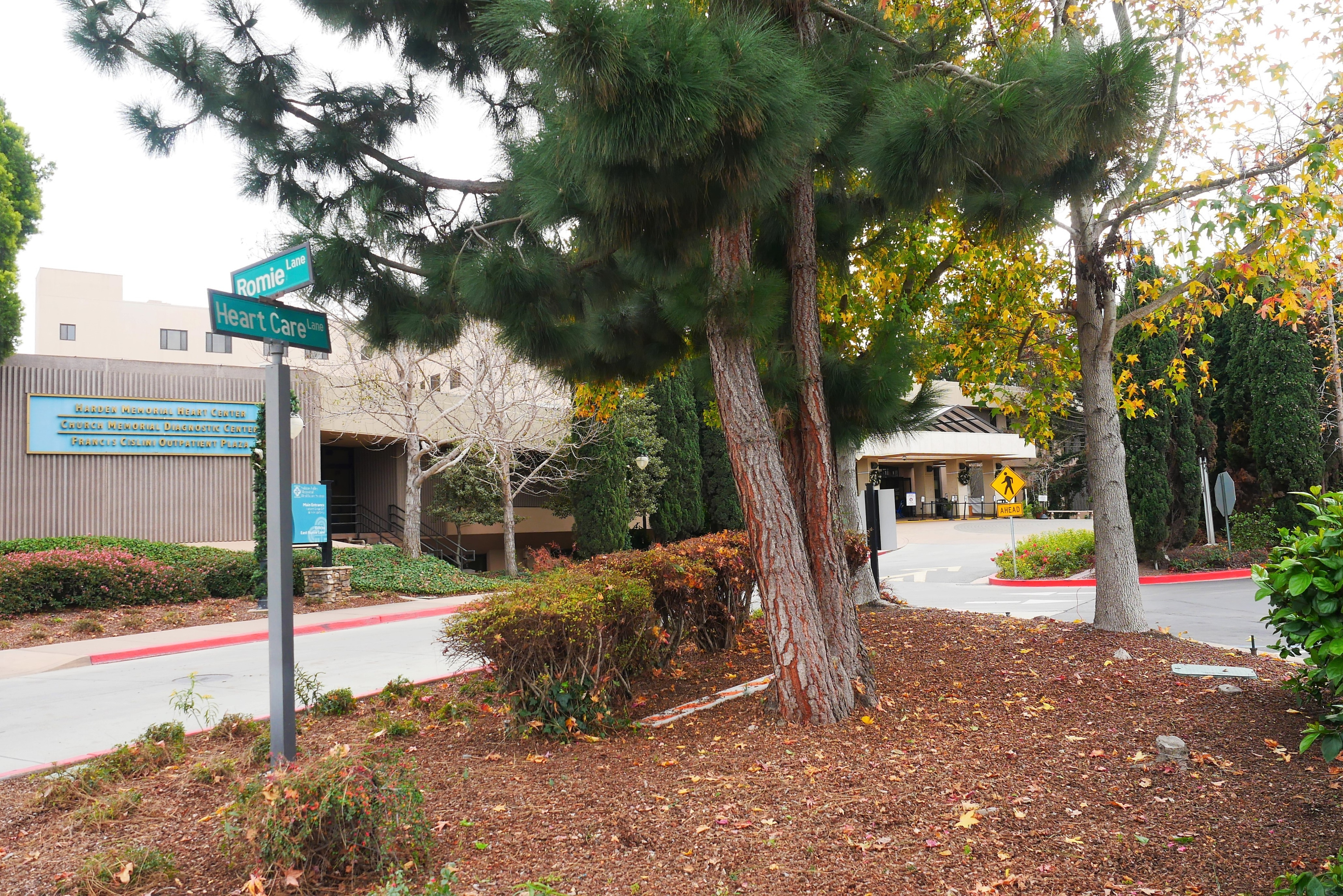
Harden Memorial Heart Center

The Salinas Valley Health Medical Center is a public district medical center in Salinas, California. Originally built in 1953, Salinas Valley Health Medical Center has 263 medical center beds and 1,800+ employees and primarily serves residents of the Salinas Valley. The medical center has partnered with local organizations such as NASA. Prior to 2023, the hospital was known as Salinas Valley Memorial Hospital.

== History ==
Around 1941, the newly formed Salinas Community Hospital Association began planning and fundraising for a medical center. Salinas at the time had a population of thirty-eight thousand, surveys done by the organizing committee decided that Salinas needed a medical center with 86 beds. It was also decided that the medical center needed to be non-profit, all income was to go back into the medical center, with no dividends and no federal income taxes. The Board of Directors will serve without compensation. The association was formed and led by businessman Bruce Church and Oscar R. Daley. The campaign organization was led by chairman Frank Cornell and Associate T.R. Merrill.

Bruce Church donated a 4.58-acre tract for the medical center outright, property owners Emma E. Carpenter and Clarence A. Gordon negotiated with the board selling land on Romie Lane which was "situated midway between the junction of Highway 101 and the Maple Park district". Various fundraisers and memorials throughout the community raised funds. September 1942, California Senator Sheridan Downey announced that President FDR had approved a loan of $100,000 and a grant of $110,000 towards the medical center. The association advertised for bids in November 1942 to ready the property for sewer, a field office, and signage. The architect was Charles E. Butner.

By June 1944, the association had lost the grant and loan from FDR because of provisions of the Lanham Act which the funds could not be used for a brand new building, approval would be pushed back until post-WWII. The medical center association, led by Church, Merrill, Louis Levy, Charles Butner, and Fred McCarger reprioritized by seeking to purchase the Park Lane hospital, modernize it and grow to 50 beds. The cost was estimated to be $260,000. With this change, the grant of $130,000 could be used.

By 1945 and the end of WWII, talk began to change the name of the medical center from Salinas Community Hospital, to Memorial Hospital or as the editor of The Californian suggested, to Bataan Memorial Hospital, in memory of the Bataan Death March in the Philippines. By the end of 1945, the funding from the government had dried up due to "red tape and lack of priorities", the association had raised $108,000, plans drawn, and the sewer connections were made on the donated property. It was anticipated that $250,000 was needed to complete the medical center that they were hoping to build in early 1946 with a move-in date at the end of 1946.

Physician superintendent Dr. Anthony J. Rourke from Stanford University hospital met with the Memorial Hospital board in early 1946 explaining that $750,000 to one million dollars was needed for the medical center construction. Rourke stated that the medical center should have at least 100 beds, and be multi-floors. The community should focus on assuring doctor and medical center fees will be paid by making sure everyone is insured calling it '"prepaid hospital care"'. He assured the board that no one is at fault for the work that had already been completed, but that "a lesser cost would be entirely inadequate the first day opened" and it was best to '"start all over"'. The board voted to engage Dr. Rourke to keep from more mistakes being made. Rourke felt that the location on Romie Lane was adequate but the building design with a layout of a star was not efficient. A three to six-floor building with elevator service and kitchen and laundry facilities in the basement would be best. $300,000 had been raised.

Discussions were held on whether an attempt to raise the cash voluntarily through donations or to raise funds by bond or a tax district. A vote on a $2,000,000 bond was scheduled in April 1949. Advertisements in support of the bond stressed that the "hospital district has grown from 24,146 in 1910 to 110,000 in 1948". On April 12, 1949, the bond was passed five-to-one with 2,619 in favor of the 2 million bond to 535 against. Pebble Beach, CA architect Robert Stanton stated that it will take him a year to draw up the plans for the 133-bed medical center, bids should go out in early 1950 with completion in 1952. It was estimated that $2.7 million would be needed, with the $2 million bond and the $300,000 in savings, plus tax collections the board is confident they will be able to pay for the medical center without government help.

The Salinas Valley Memorial Hospital (now Salinas Valley Health Medical Center) opened on April 20, 1953, with 138 beds and 145 employees and physicians. The medical center offered operating rooms, a physical therapy unit, pathology and radiology labs, and a pediatric unit with a nursery and for new fathers, a “pacing room”. The medical center was built with the lightest materials possible while still maintaining safety. They reduced over three tons of weight since Salinas is an earthquake area, which makes the building even safer as the weight of the building causes stress on the building during earthquakes. The medical center used state-of-the-art engineering standards that met or exceeded fire and earthquake requirements. Sprinklers installed in storerooms and the Salinas fire department were given an orientation. Rate schedules at the opening were two bedrooms $15.50, large private room with bath $22, bassinets during normal delivery $2.50 a day, premature nursery $9. "Patients who reside in the Salinas Valley Memorial hospital district will receive a discount of $1 per day".

On March 29, 1953, the day of dedication, Bruce Church received a letter of congratulations from President Dwight D. Eisenhower, which commented on how no state or federal funds were used to build the medical center. The final cost by opening day was $3.3 million. Roy Diaz, a Salinas Tank company hero on Bataan" ... will unveil the plaque dedicated to "the memory of the men and women of the armed forces who made the supreme sacrifice for their community and their nation". The Masters of ceremonies were Mayor E. J. Raffetto, L. W. Wing was vice president of the board of directors. Over 2,000 residents attended the dedication ceremony.

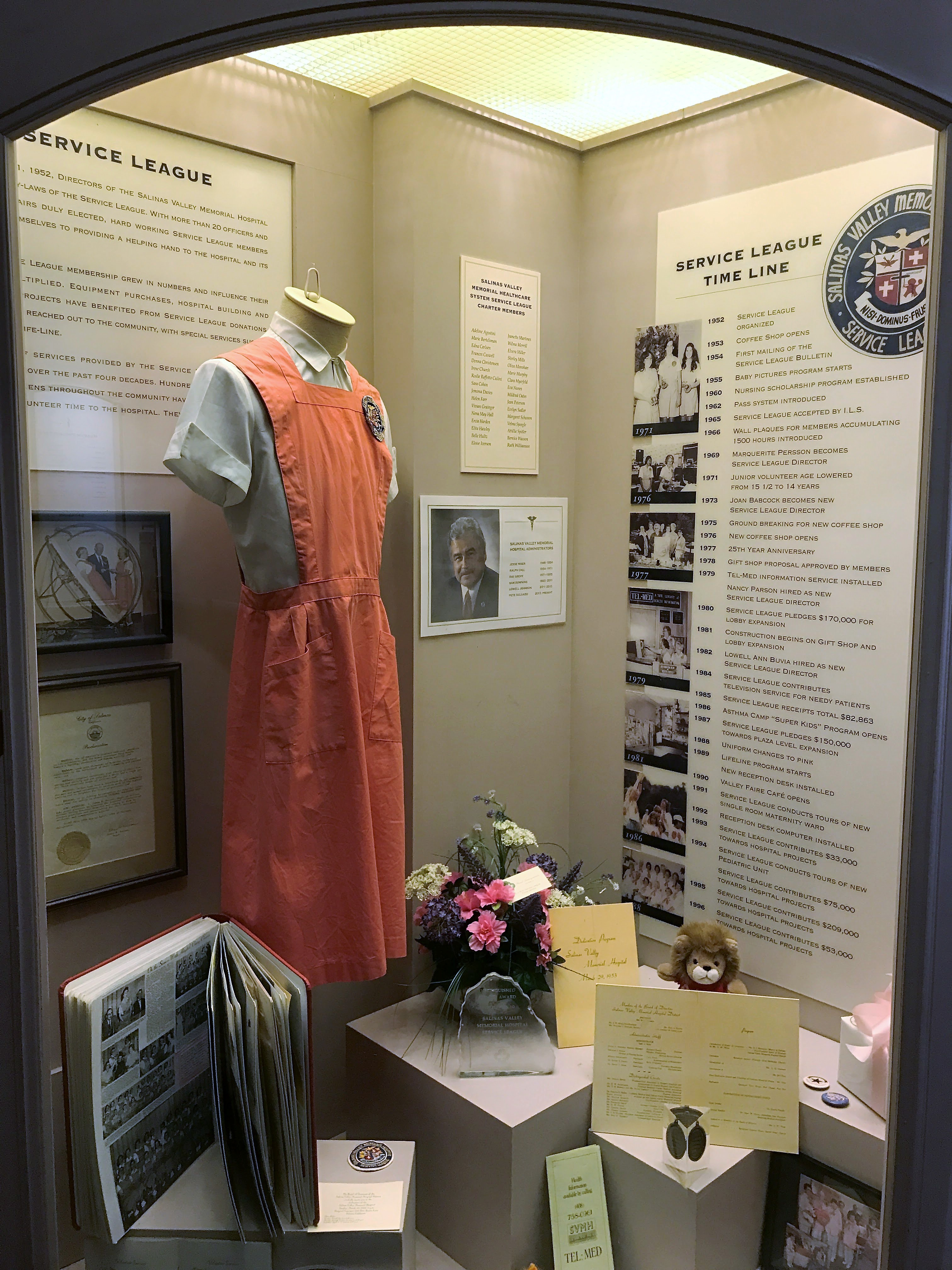
SVMH Service League exhibit

On February 20, 2023, the Salinas Valley Memorial Healthcare System was renamed to Salinas Valley Health; the name change was intended to "encompass all of the health care system's resources". The hospital's new name became Salinas Valley Health Medical Center.

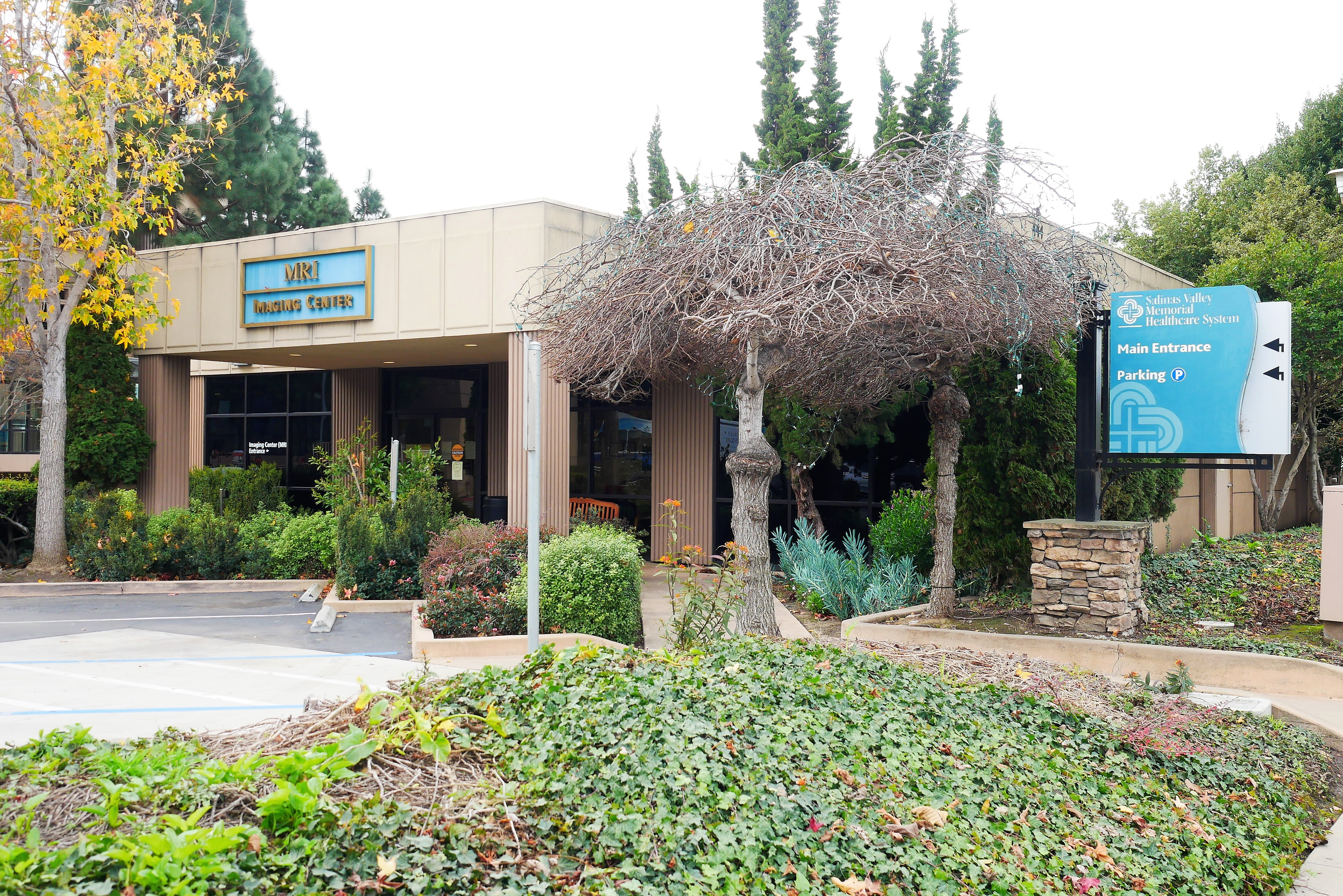
SVMH MRI Imaging Center

== Programs and facilities ==
- L.M. Tynan Emergency Center and Paramedic Base Station
- Joyce Wyman Outpatient Surgery Center
- Orradre New Life Center for Single Room Maternity Care
- Salinas Valley Health Susan Bacon Cancer Resource Center
- Diagnostic Imaging Center
- Norman P. Andresen, MD Neonatal Intensive Care Unit
- Signing of a Space Act Agreement with NASA and establishment of the Virtual Collaborative Clinic
- Salinas Valley Health Taylor Farms Family Health & Wellness Center
- Leonard V. Breschini - Energy Management Center
- Nathan J. Olivas Center

== Partnerships and affiliations ==
=== NASA ===
On September 9, 1998, Salinas Valley Health Medical Center and the NASA Ames BioVIS (Biological Visualization, Imaging, and Simulation) Technology Center signed a Space Act Agreement. This partnership gives the medical center 3-D imaging capabilities for diagnostic analysis. Low orbiting satellites can transmit these analyses to any location. In June 1999, Salinas Valley Health Medical Center became one of the medical facilities to hold the title, along with Stanford University and the Cleveland Research Clinic, “virtual hospital.” On July 21, 2004, the Salinas Valley Health and NASA signed a new Space Act Agreement, which enables them to work together on 3-D, digital fusion-imaging projects.

=== Stanford affiliation with NICU ===
Since the Neonatal Intensive Care Unit opened in late 2001, it has worked with Stanford University's Lucile Packard Children's Hospital. Salinas Valley Health Medical Center and Stanford University are linked through an audio/video network so they can transmit information about each baby if needed. The medical center has a Level III nursery that provides care for the most critical babies, including those who are premature babies.

=== SVMH Medical Museum ===
After collecting medical artifacts, many from the Salinas Valley, Dr. June Dunbar donated her collection to a dedicated exbibit of medical history at the Museum of Medical History, which opened in 1998. The museum is located at the bottom of the parking garage and has instruments from doctors practicing in 1850. The Salinas Valley Health Medical Center Medical Museum exhibits include amputation sets, bottles from druggists, instruments used for tonsillectomies, and other exhibits focusing on local medical history. A replica of the office of Dr. Henry Murphy shows how medicine was practiced in the years John Steinbeck grew up. The museum has the operating table Murphy used when he removed Steinbeck's tonsils. The museum is open to the public and for school tours. According to one of the museum displays, the Service League donated $75,000 to start the construction of the museum. The Medical Center Board of Directors worked with Director of Facilities and Construction Barbara Sullivan to create the displays. Medical Center staff purchased a collection of 18th and 19th-century medical instruments for $50,000.

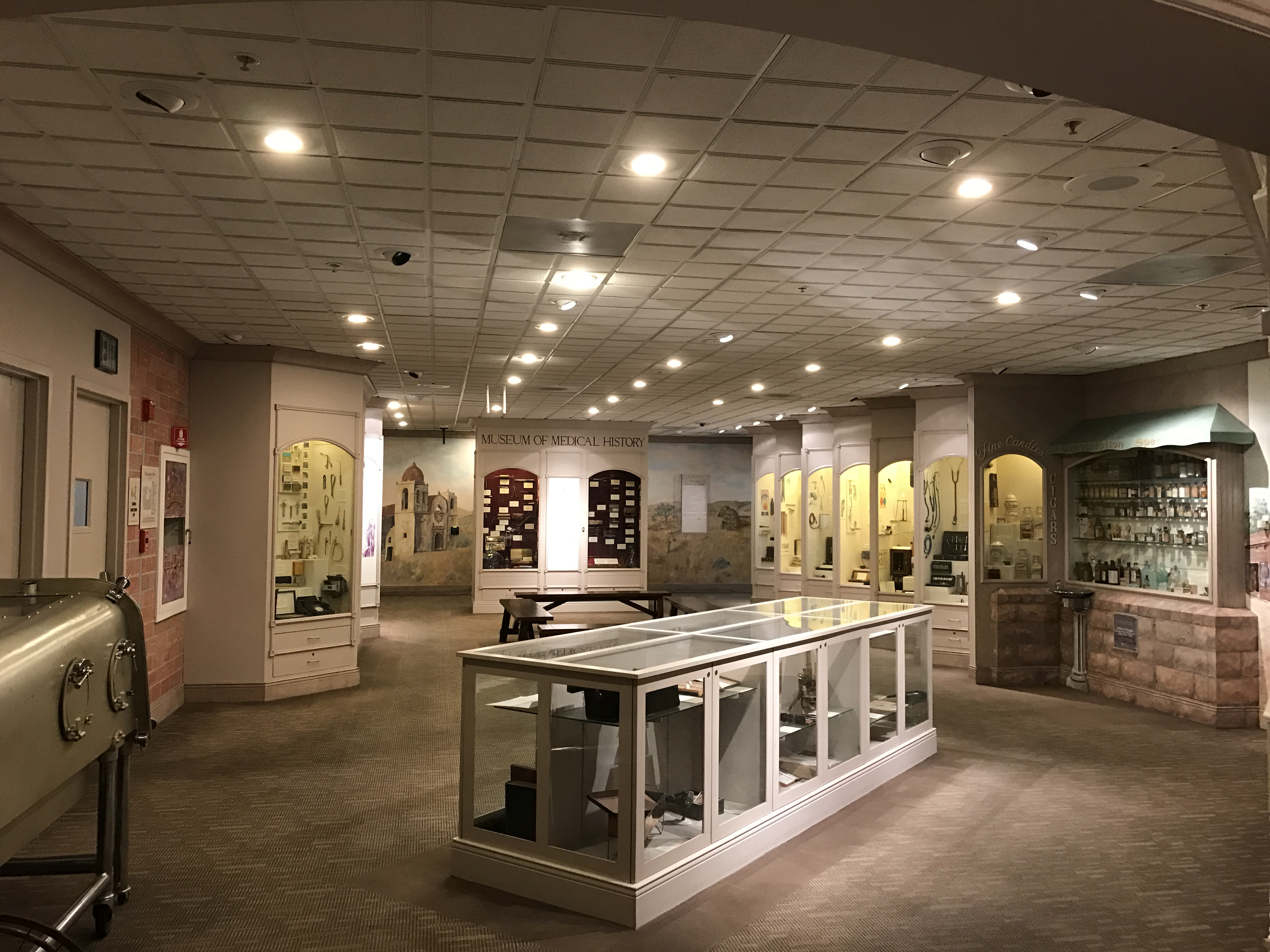
Entrance to SVMH Medical Museum

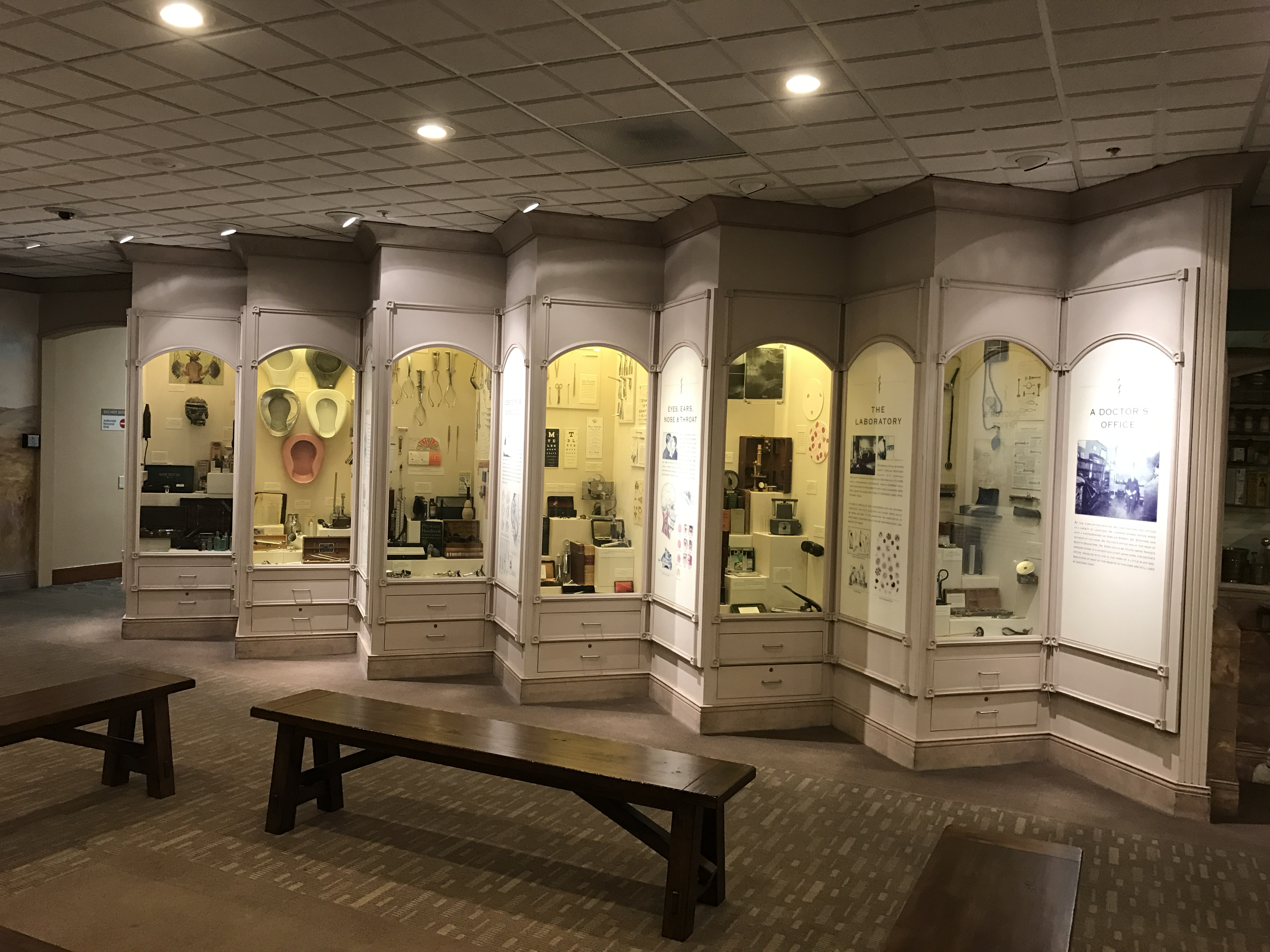
Displays at the medical museum

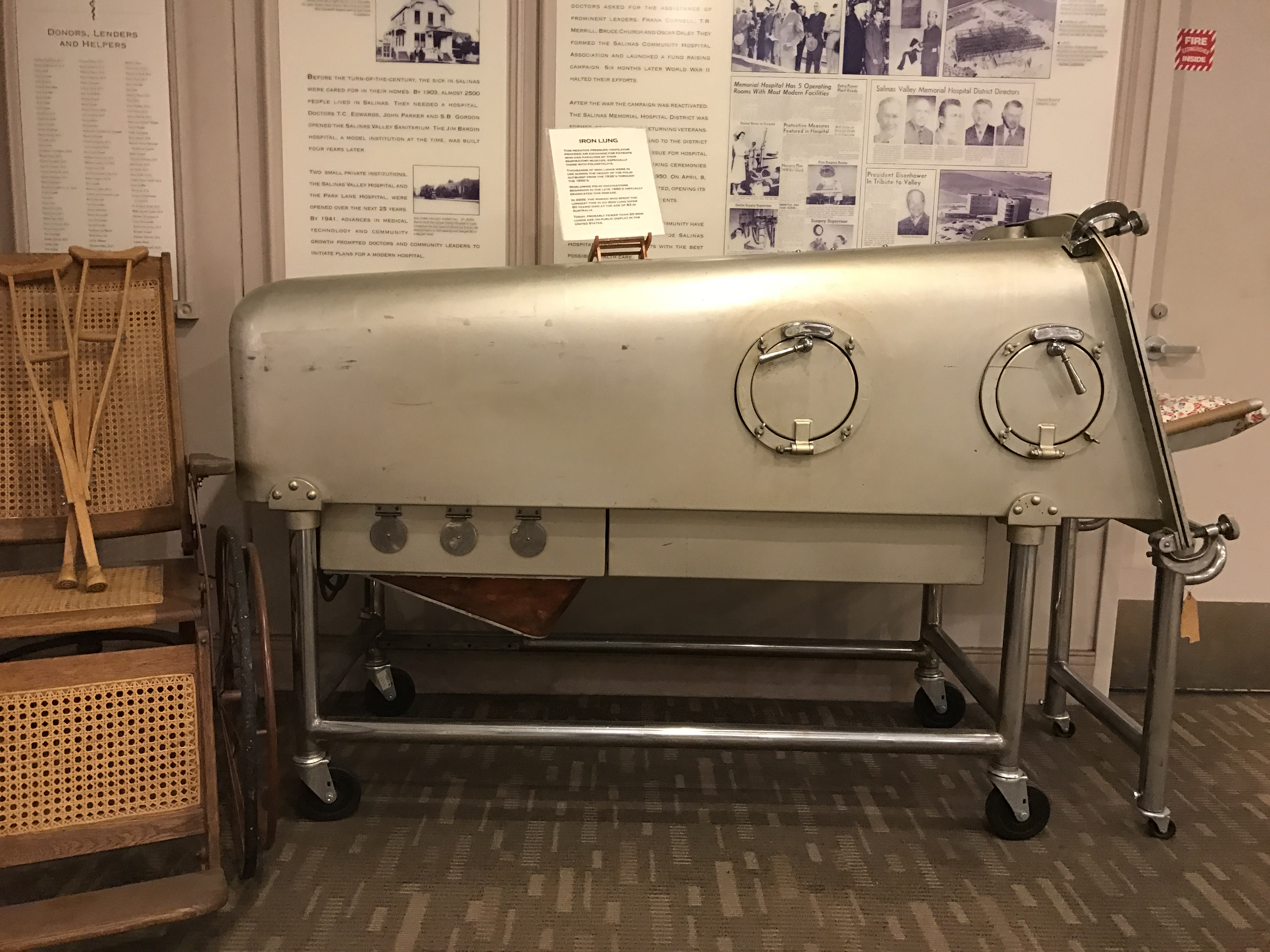
Iron Lung

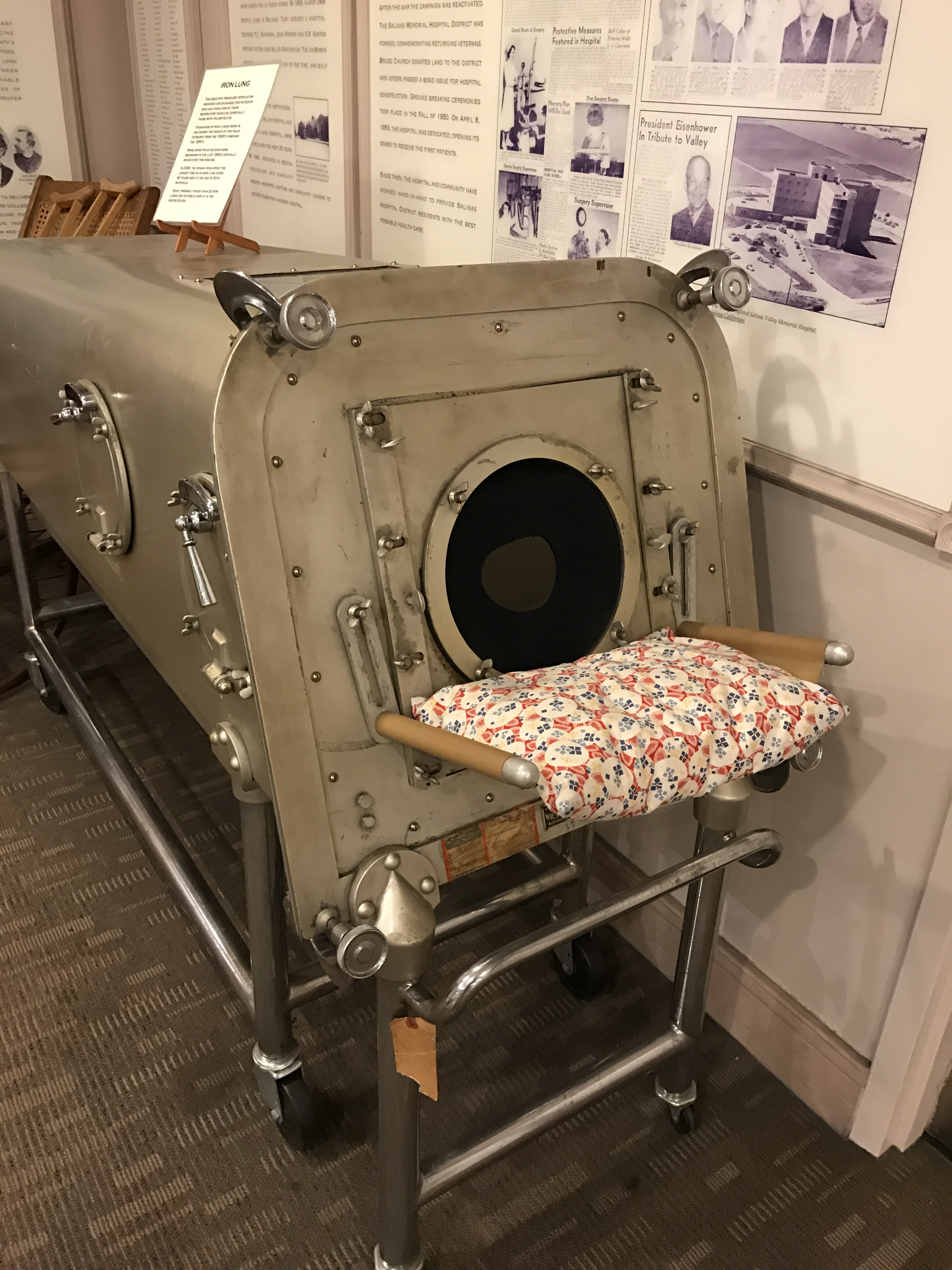
Front of Iron Lung

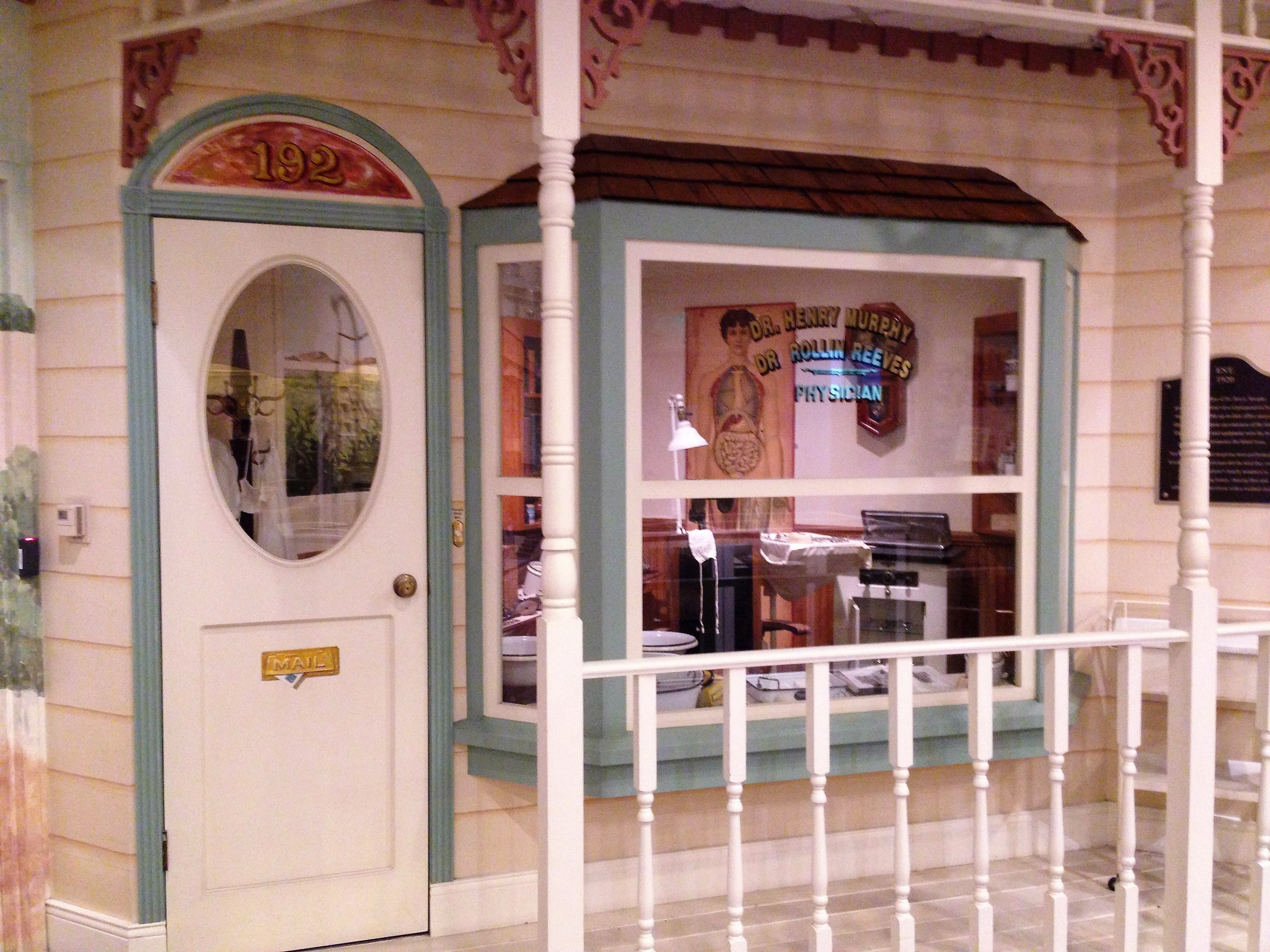
Dr. Henry Murphy exhibit

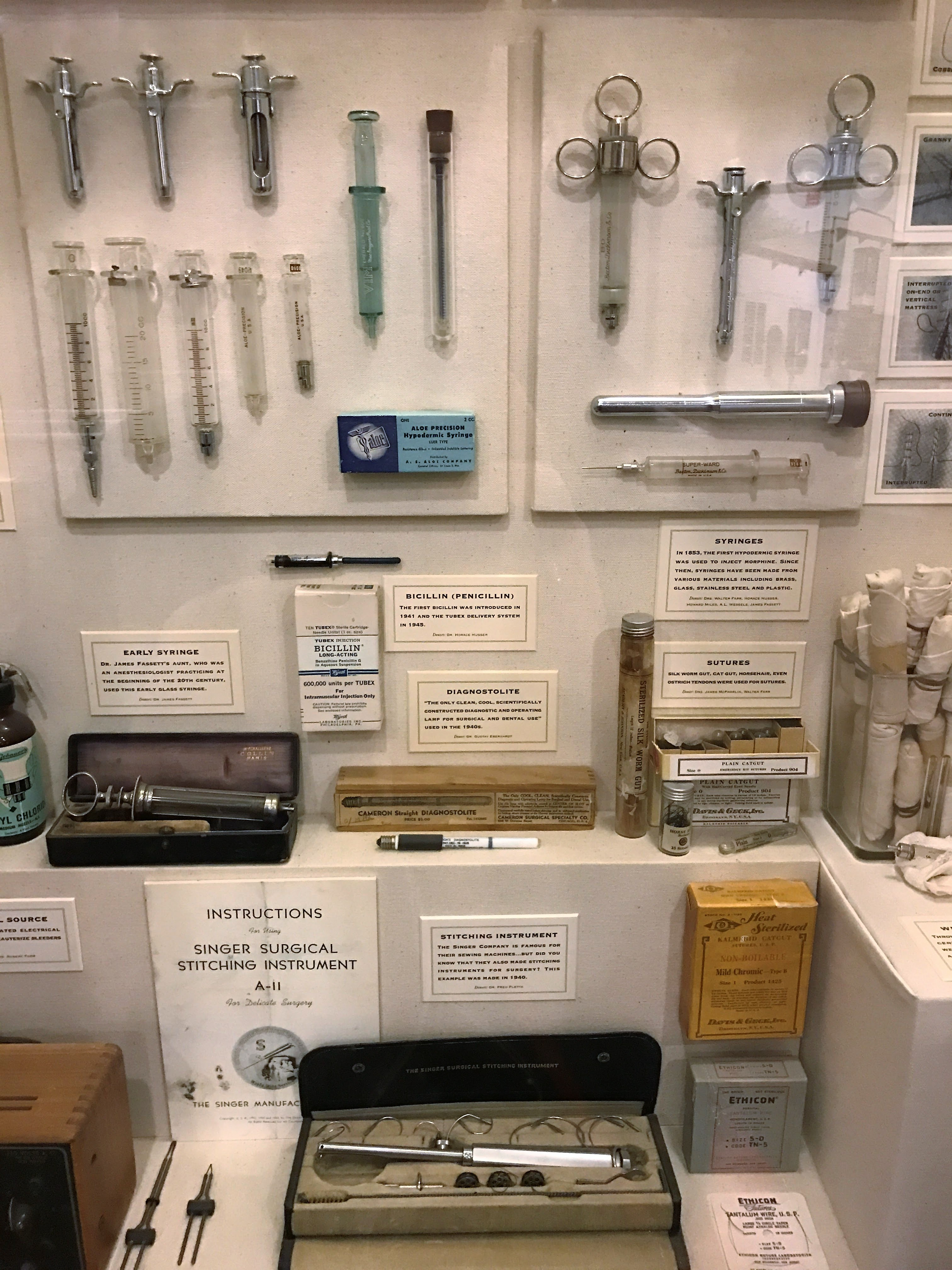
Medical instruments

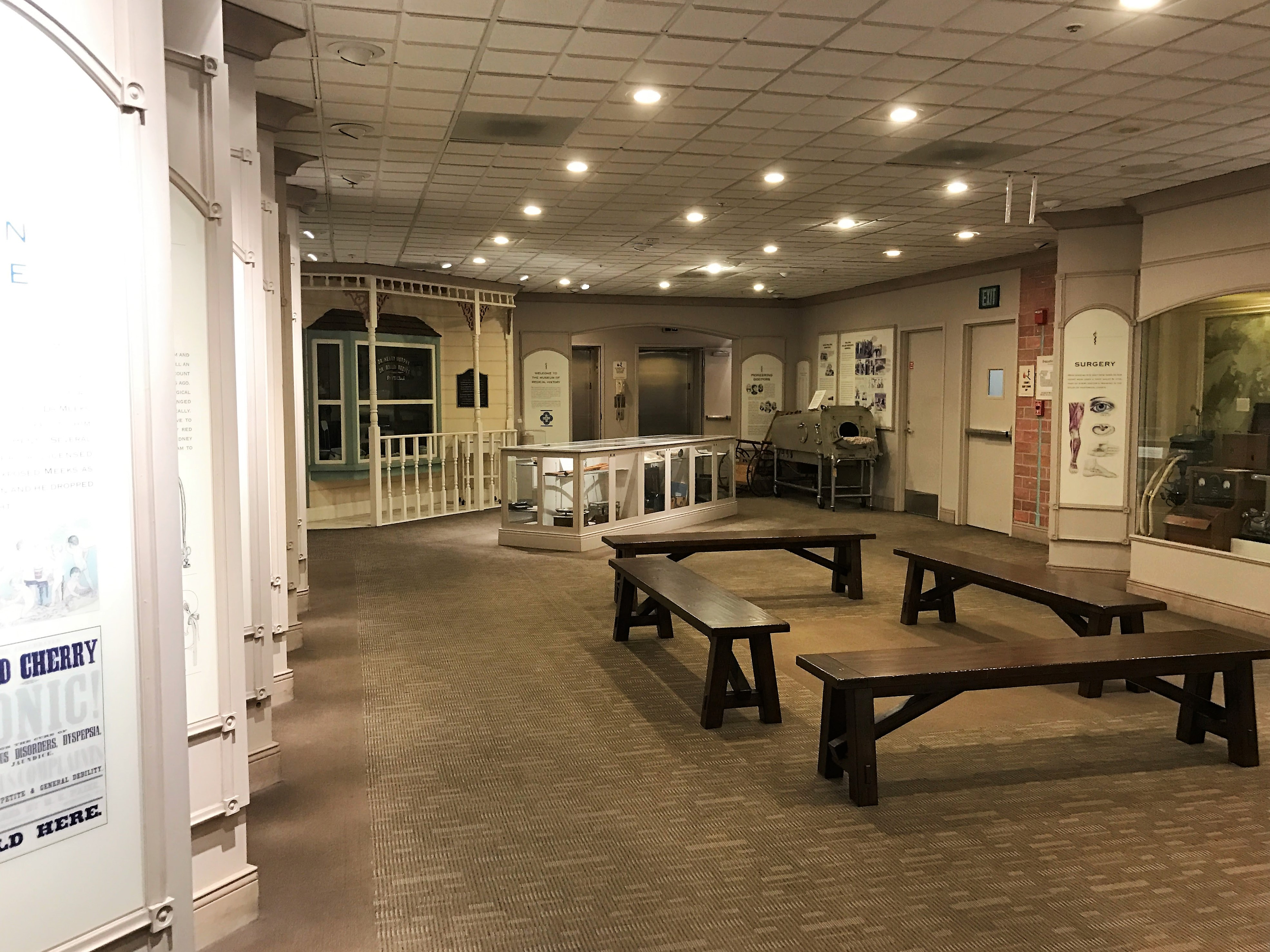
Tour area

== See also ==
- Community Hospital of the Monterey Peninsula
- Natividad Medical Center
