= Del Monte Heights, Seaside, California =

Neighborhood in Seaside, California, United States

Del Monte Heights
- Former Unincorporated community District of Seaside
- Location in California
- Coordinates: 36°36′42″N 121°49′56″W
- Country: United States
- State: California
- County: Monterey County
- City: Seaside
- Elevation: 151 ft (46 m)

Del Monte Heights (Del Monte, Spanish for "Of The Mountain") is a neighborhood of Seaside in Monterey County, California. It was formerly an unincorporated community. It is located 1 mile (1.6 km) east of downtown Seaside, at an elevation of 151 feet (46 m).

Del Monte Heights was laid out in 1909 by F.M. Hilby and George W. Phelps.
