= Monterey–Salinas Transit =

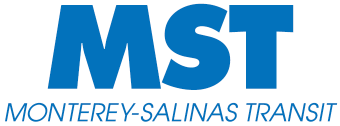

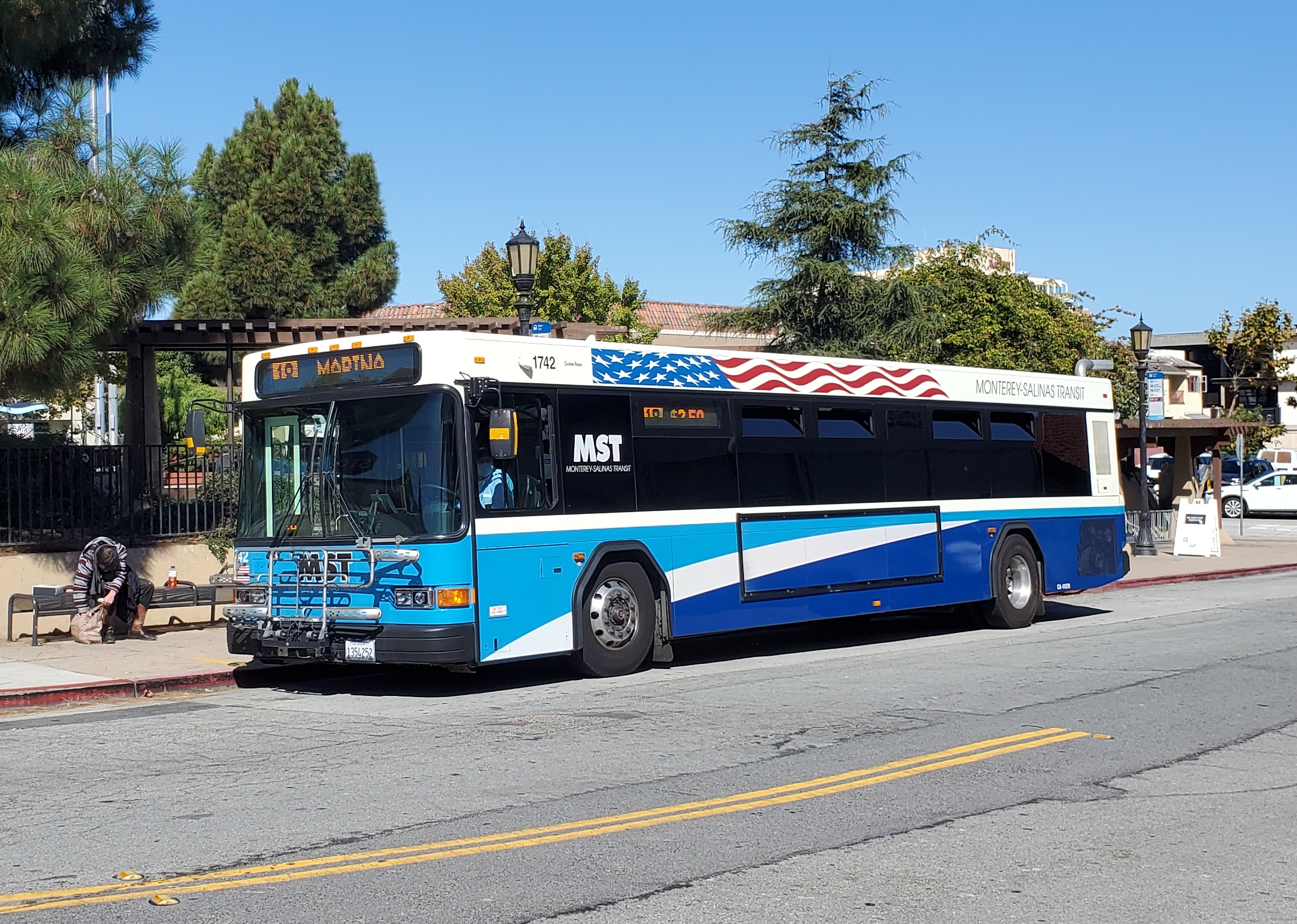
- Monterey-Salinas Transit bus in Monterey in 2021
- Founded: 1981
- Headquarters: One Ryan Ranch Road, Monterey, California USA
- Service area: Monterey County and parts of Santa Cruz, San Luis Obispo and Santa Clara Counties
- Service type: bus service, DRT, paratransit
- Routes: 34
- Stops: 954
- Stations: Monterey Transit Plaza; Salinas Transit Center, Marina Transit Exchange
- Fleet: 133
- Daily ridership: 9,500 (weekdays, Q4 2025)
- Annual ridership: 2,991,200 (2025)
- Operator: Monterey-Salinas Transit District
- Website: mst.org

Monterey–Salinas Transit (MST) is the public transit system for Monterey County, California. Service is primarily to the greater Monterey and Salinas areas, but extends as far south as Paso Robles and as far north as Watsonville and Gilroy. Most lines follow a hub-and-spoke system, connecting at hubs in Monterey or Salinas. In 2025, the system had a ridership of 2,991,200, or about 9,500 per weekday as of the fourth quarter of 2025.

== History ==
The first public transportation services for Monterey County were provided by Southern Pacific Railroad passenger trains, including the Del Monte to and from San Francisco along the Monterey Branch Line connecting Pacific Grove to Castroville. The Monterey and Pacific Grove Railway provided the first intra-county services using horse cars starting on August 5, 1891. Independent streetcar systems in Monterey (the Monterey and Del Monte Heights Railway Company, connecting Monterey to Seaside) and Salinas (the "Dingy" for Spreckels Sugar Company employees and their families) started around 1912.

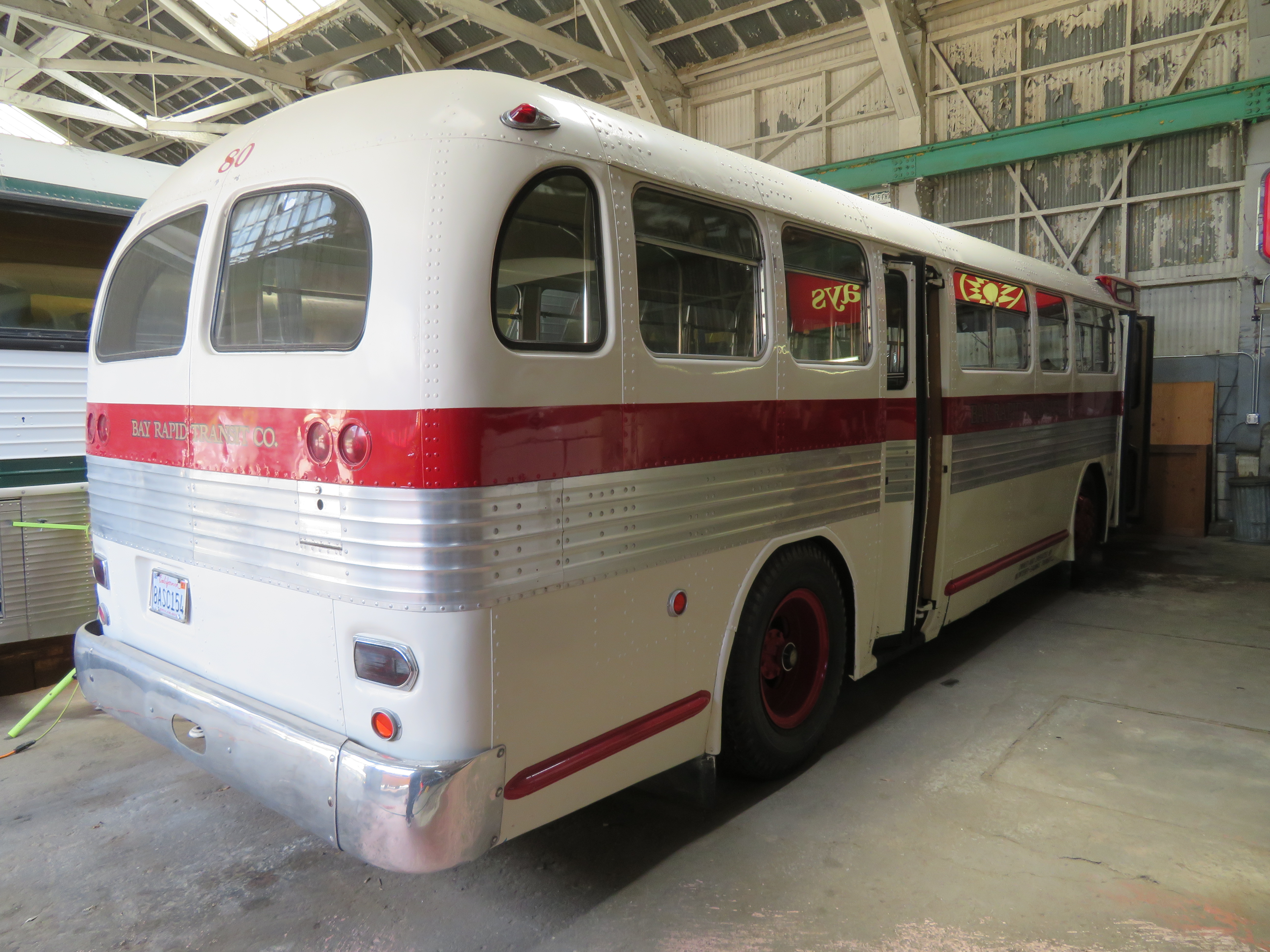
Bay Rapid Transit Co. (replica) Fageol-Twin Coach bus, originally built in 1948 for Tacoma Transit Company; it was purchased by MST in 1983 and repainted in BRTCo. livery. It is currently owned and housed at the Pacific Bus Museum.

The first motorbus services began in 1918, provided by the Monterey-Carmel Bus Line; a younger upstart, Bay Rapid Transit, was formed in 1922. Bay Rapid Transit aggressively challenged existing streetcar lines, operating over the same routes and offering promotions and lower fares to attract passengers. The facilities of the Monterey and Pacific Grove Railway were destroyed in a mysterious fire and that streetcar line ceased operations in December 1923. Bay Rapid Transit expanded their coverage to Carmel in 1925 and other motorbus services started at this time, including East Monterey Bus Lines (EMBL, 1932), providing service to Seaside and Fort Ord. EMBL folded in 1947 after the wartime boom (providing transportation for sailors and soldiers at Ford Ord and Monterey) ended, despite booming Cannery Row sardine operations. Canneries began closing in the early 1950s after the sardine population collapsed and passenger traffic began to decline.

Meanwhile in Salinas, the Robb and Baily Transit Company were granted a franchise to service Salinas Airport in 1937 but filed for bankruptcy three years later; its assets were purchased by the Robb Transportation Company, which continued to provide public transportation services in the City of Salinas until 1953, when the privately owned Salinas Transportation Company took over routes in Salinas and Alisal, starting from 1954.

By 1972, it was apparent that Bay Rapid Transit, like other privately owned transportation services in California, would need public subsidies to continue operations. Monterey Peninsula Transit (MPT), formed as a joint powers authority by cities in Monterey County (initially Carmel, Del Rey Oaks, Monterey, Pacific Grove, and Seaside) and the County of Monterey, took over Bay Rapid Transit lines in 1973; Marina would join the MPTJPA in 1975. Pacific Grove operated its own system (Mini-Monarch Transit) briefly until 1978, when it was absorbed into MPT. In Salinas, the city took over operations from Salinas City Lines in 1976 and operated its routes as the Salinas Transit System. Monterey–Salinas Transit was formed in 1981 when Salinas Transit was absorbed into Monterey Peninsula Transit and Salinas joined the MPTJPA.

The JPA was dissolved and re-formed as the Monterey–Salinas Transit District on July 1, 2010.

=== Governance ===
MST is governed by a board of directors, with one member and one alternate from each municipality (the listed cities); in addition, the County of Monterey has a member and alternate:

- Carmel-by-the-Sea
- Del Rey Oaks
- Gonzales
- Greenfield
- King City
- Marina
- Monterey
- Pacific Grove
- Salinas
- Sand City
- Seaside
- Soledad

The members of the Board elect a Chair and Vice Chair. The Board of Directors appoints the General Manager, who oversees daily operations and maintenance activities.

== Service ==
Key intercity routes for MST and passenger rail services (Caltrain Monterey County Rail Extension and Amtrak Coast Starlight) in Monterey County; note MST's 22 Big Sur was discontinued in September 2021

MST currently operates 131 fixed-route lines, two demand-responsive transit services, free seasonal shuttles, and paratransit service, covering a service area of 295 sq mi (760 km^{2}). Six of the fixed routes are long-distance intercity commuter routes that connect to destinations outside the county, including Santa Cruz, Paso Robles, and Templeton. Supplemental service is offered on relevant lines during major events and is usually free for event ticketholders.

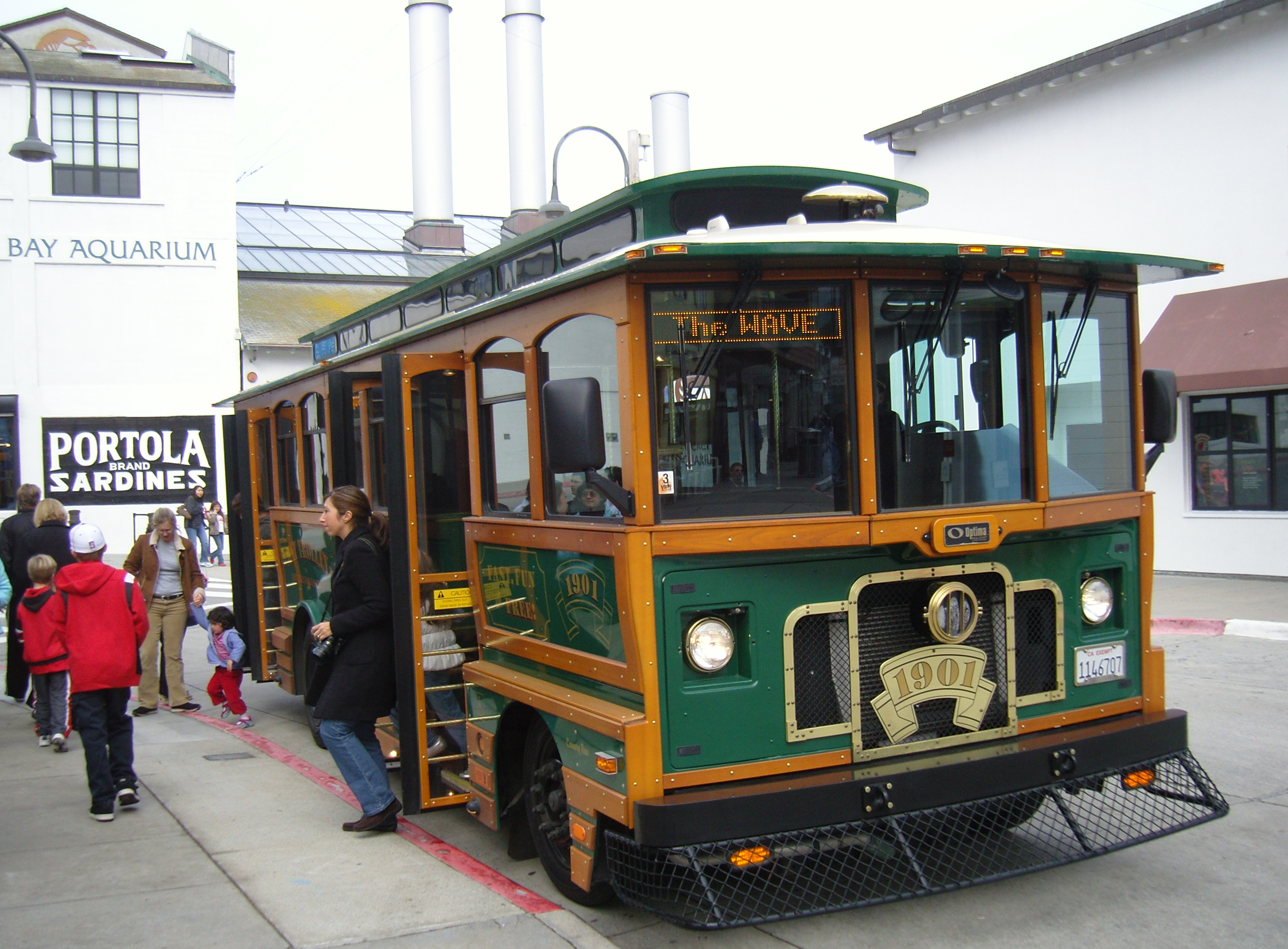
MST Trolley (2006)

During the summer and select holidays, the MST Trolley, formerly the Waterfront Area Visitor Express (WAVE), a free shuttle, serves Old Town Monterey, Cannery Row, and the Monterey Bay Aquarium.

MST's demand-responsive transit service, MST On Call, covers areas away from MST's standard routes. MST On Call Marina provides timed transfers at Marina Transit Exchange. MST On Call South County serves the cities of Gonzales, Greenfield and King and provides connections to the Line 23 serving the highway 101 corridor from King City to Salinas.

MST RIDES is a paratransit service available to persons who have a disability preventing them from using MST's regular fixed-route service. It operates under its own fare structure.

As of 2020, MST plans to construct a dedicated busway for the SURF! bus rapid transit service on the former Monterey Branch Line between Marina and Sand City.

=== Hubs ===
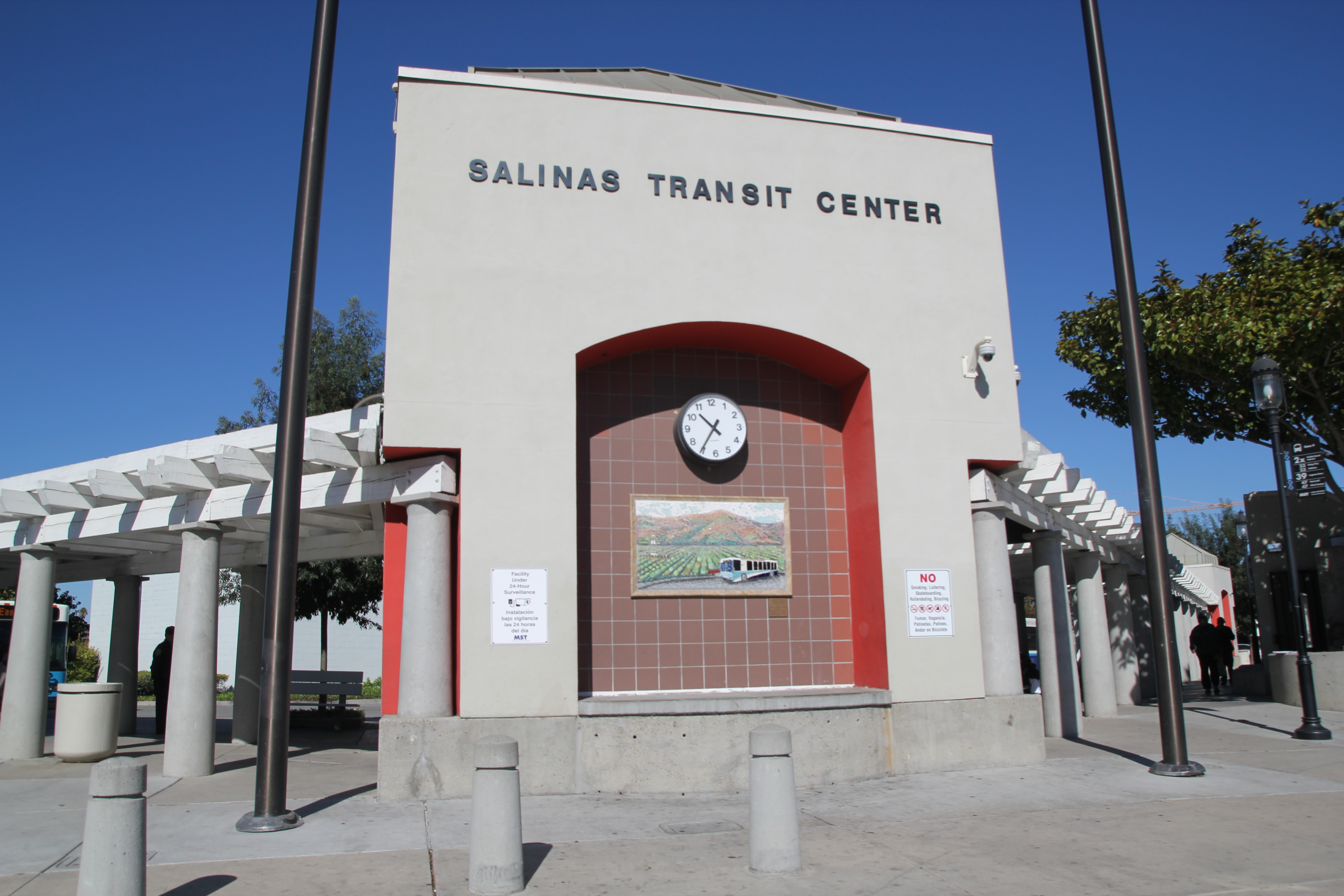
Salinas Transit Center (2012)

The primary passenger hubs of the MST system are the Monterey Transit Plaza and the Salinas Transit Center, which serve most local and regional services. The Salinas hub is planned to be relocated to the Salinas Intermodal Transportation Center when Caltrain service is extended to Salinas. Smaller hubs include Watsonville Transit Center, Marina Transit Exchange, Sand City Station, CSUMB, Del Monte Center, and Carmel Plaza.

=== Operations ===
MST performs maintenance and refueling at four facilities:

- Thomas D. Albert Division, 1 Ryan Ranch Road (Monterey), fixed routes
- Clarence J. Wright Division, 443 Victor Way (Salinas), fixed routes
- South County Operations and Maintenance, San Antonio Drive (King City), long-distance intercity routes
- MV Transportation, 4512 Joey Lloyd Way (Seaside), paratransit service (owned and operated by contractor)

== See also ==
- Monterey County Rail Extension
