= Del Monte Center =

Coordinates: 36°35′2″N 121°53′48″W

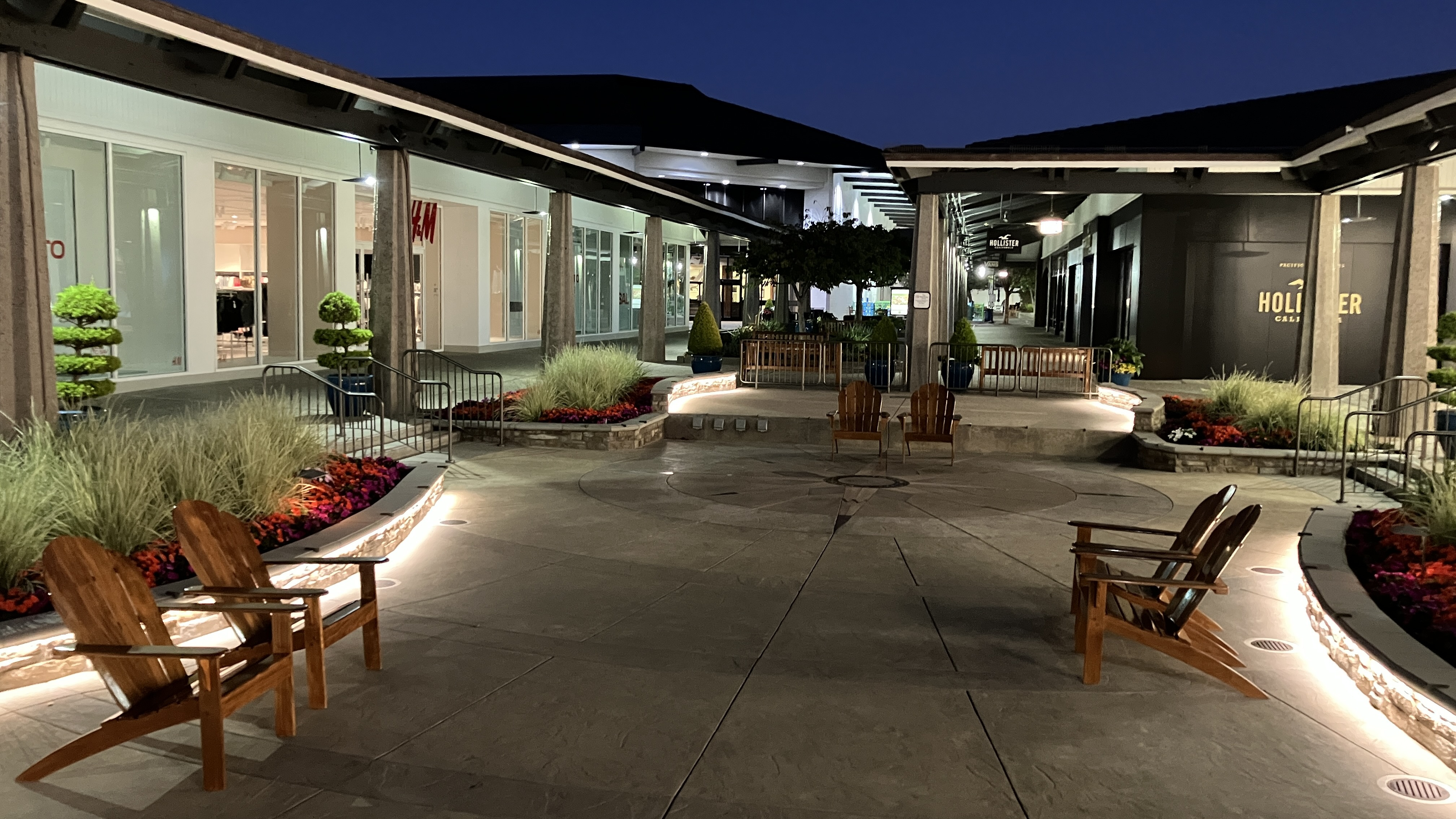
- Location: Monterey, CA
- Address: 1410 Del Monte Center
- Opened: 1967
- Developer: Williams and Burrows Construction Company
- Owner: Federal Realty Investment Trust
- Architect: John Carl Warnecke
- Num. of stores: 85
- Num. of anchor tenants: 3
- Floor area: 675,000 square feet (62,700 m^{2})
- Floors: 1 (3 in Macy's)
- Website: https://www.delmontecenter.com

Del Monte Shopping Center is an open-air shopping center located in Monterey, California, United States. Del Monte Center is the largest shopping center on the Monterey Peninsula. Del Monte Center was designed by architect John Carl Warnecke, and structural engineers Simpson, Stratta and Associates, and built by Williams and Burrows Construction Company. It originally opened in 1967, but was expanded and renovated in 1987. The shopping center encompasses 675,000 square feet (62,700 m^{2}) of retail space including 85 stores, one department store (Macy's), Whole Foods Market, restaurants (California Pizza Kitchen, Kona Steak and Seafood, Pizza My Heart, Islands Fine Burgers & Drinks, Subway, Chipotle Mexican Grill, Starbucks and Lalla Grill), a gym and spa (Energia) and a thirteen screen Century Theatres. Petco was added in 2004, replacing Stroud's.

In 2007, Del Monte Center started a major renovation project which included the addition of several new high-end retailers. Banana Republic opened in Fall 2007, with Pottery Barn and Williams Sonoma following in the spring of 2008. This renovation also included a new restaurant, P.F. Chang's China Bistro, which replaced Marie Callender's. The first Apple retail store in the Monterey region opened at Del Monte Center on August 9, 2008. Other new stores include Lucky Brand Jeans, Hollister Co., Lucy and Pandora Jewelry.

The center was purchased from American Assets Trust by Federal Realty Investment Trust in 2025.

== Community events ==
The Del Monte Center hosts a number of community events throughout the year. These include Musical Marketplace, a series of concerts that raise money for charity.

== Location ==
The Del Monte Center is located at the intersection of Highways 1 & 68, Munras Avenue and Soledad Drive in Monterey.

== Website ==
- Official website
