= Natividad Medical Center =

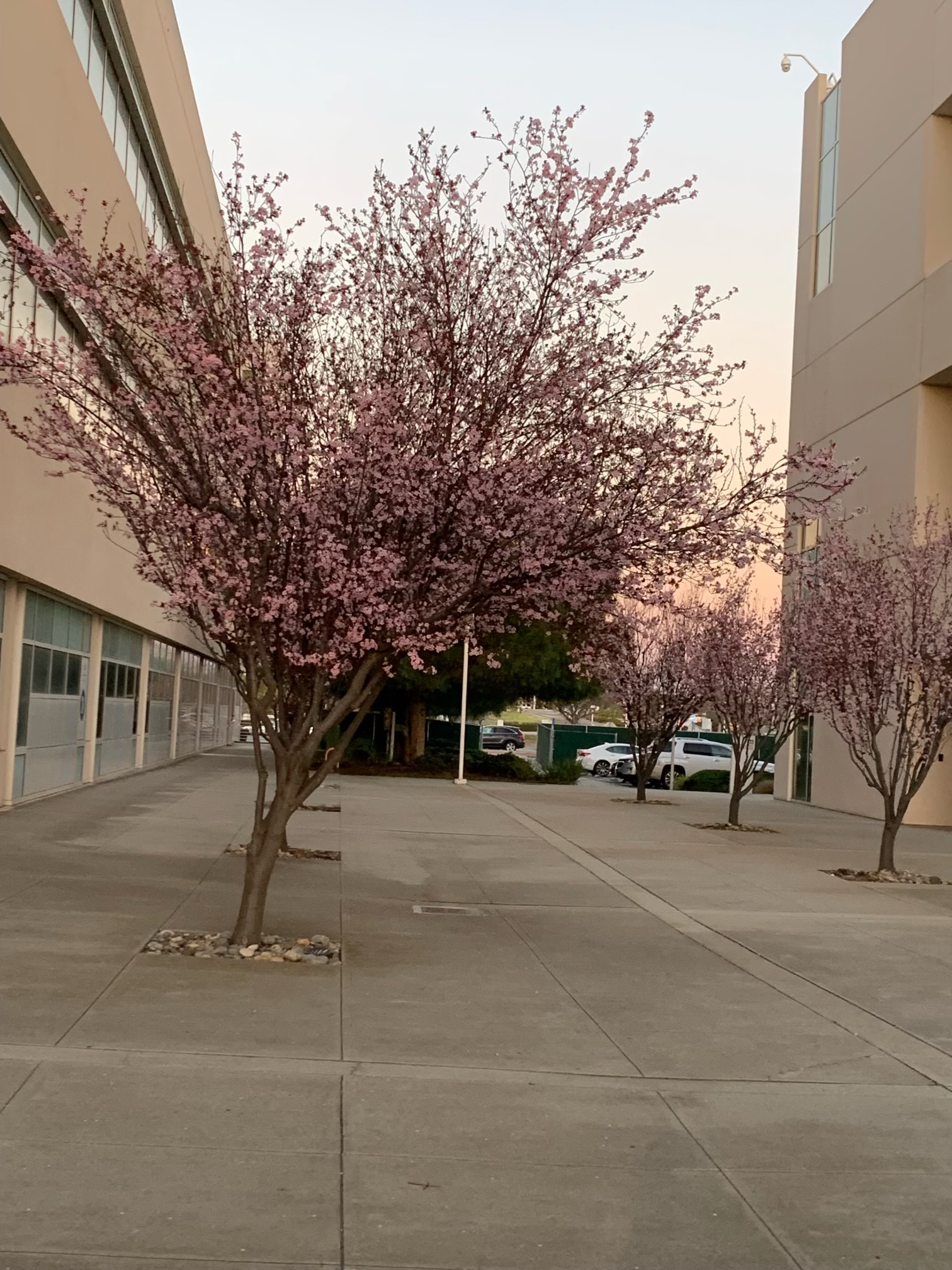
- Cherry Blossom trees on a quiet Tuesday Morning at Natividad.

Geography
- Location: 1441 Constitution Blvd, 93906-3100, Salinas, California, USA
- Coordinates: 36.6975°N 121.6326°W

Organisation
- Care system: County
- Type: Teaching
- Affiliated university: University of California, San Francisco (UCSF)

Services
- Emergency department: Level II Trauma Center
- Beds: 172

Helipads
- Helipad: (FAA LID: 5CL4)

History
- Founded: 1886

Links
- Website: www.natividad.com

Natividad Medical Center, also known as Natividad Hospital, or simply just as, Natividad, is a 172-bed acute-care teaching hospital located in Salinas, California. The hospital is owned and operated by Monterey County and the hospital's emergency department receives approximately 52,000 visits per year.

As a safety-net hospital providing healthcare to the residents of Monterey County for over 134 years, Natividad provides healthcare access to all patients regardless of their ability to pay. The hospital operates with a medical staff of over 300 physicians and has several specialty clinics as well as outpatient primary care clinics operated by the Monterey County Health Department.

In 2015, Natividad was formally designated as a level II trauma center, providing the immediate availability of specialized personnel, equipment, and services to treat the most severe and critical injuries.

Natividad is the only teaching hospital on the Central Coast through its affiliation with the University of California, San Francisco (UCSF). Recognized nationally and internationally as a model program, Natividad's Family Medicine Residency Program is postgraduate training for physicians specializing in family medicine. About 1/3 of the graduates remain on the central coast to establish a practice.

Natividad is governed by a Board of Trustees, under the guidance of the Monterey County Board of Supervisors.

Natividad is fully accredited by the American College of Surgeons as a comprehensive bariatric surgery center. Natividad Medical Center is accredited by the Joint Commission.

== History ==
Natividad was originally founded in 1886 with today's main hospital opened in 1998. During the COVID-19 pandemic, the hospital produced PSA-style videos to reach immigrant farmworkers in the area.

== Highlights ==
- Safety net hospitals like Natividad make up only 21 of California's more than 450 hospitals and health care systems, provide 40% of all hospital care for California's uninsured, and train more than half of all new doctors in the state.
- Natividad has more than 52,000 Emergency Department visits each year, one-third of which are children.
- The Neonatal Intensive Care Unit (NICU) affiliated with UCSF Benioff Children Hospital has a Level III designation from the California Department of Health, meets the strictest criteria, and is staffed and equipped to care for critically ill infants.
- Natividad's bariatric weight loss program is equipped with the latest technology in weight loss surgery and is fully accredited by the American College of Surgeons MBSAQIP.
- Natividad specializes in family medicine offering comprehensive primary care and obstetrics, minor outpatient surgical procedures, vaccinations, well-child and adult care, physical exams, and referrals to specialty services.
- Natividad houses the Sally P. Archer Child Advocacy Center & Bates-Eldredge Clinic, Monterey County's only child maltreatment clinic. Professionals at the Center provide developmentally sensitive and legally sound child forensic interviews and forensic medical examinations to assist in the investigation and criminal prosecution of child abuse cases.
- In December 2020, Natividad was loaned a deep-freeze fridge from the Monterey Bay Aquarium in order to allow the hospital to store the Pfizer–BioNTech COVID-19 vaccine at -94 degrees Fahrenheit. Normally the aquarium uses the freezer for preserving "biological and veterinary samples". Prior to the loan, the hospital had planned on keeping the vaccine on dry ice which would have meant changing the dry ice every five days.

== Graduate medical education ==
Natividad operates a residency program to train recently graduated physicians in family medicine. The residency is affiliated with the University of California, San Francisco (UCSF).
