= Community Hospital of the Monterey Peninsula =

Hospital in California, U.S.

- Montage Health

Geography
- Location: 23625 Holman Hwy., Monterey, California, California, United States
- Coordinates: 36°34′47″N 121°54′37″W

History
- Former name: Grace Deere Velie Metabolic Clinic
- Constructed: 1934

Links
- Website: www.montagehealth.org/locations/profile/community-hospital-monterey-peninsula/
- Lists: Hospitals in California

Community Hospital of the Monterey Peninsula (CHOMP) was founded in 1934 and is located at 23625 Holman Highway in Monterey, California. The hospital has 258 acute care beds and 28 skilled-nursing beds. CHOMP has 15 locations, including the main hospital, outpatient facilities, satellite laboratories, a mental health clinic, a short-term nursing facility, and business offices.

== History ==
CHOMP was founded by Grace Deere Velie Harris (granddaughter of John Deere) and was originally called the Grace Deere Velie Metabolic Clinic. In 1929, she established an endowment to create a clinic in Monterey, California specializing in metabolic disorders. In 1934, the hospital became a Class A, 30-bed general hospital named Peninsula Community Hospital.

In the late 1950s, Samuel Finley Brown Morse donated 22 acres (8.9 ha) in the Del Monte forest for a new 100-bed hospital building. In 1961, the hospital received its current name, the Community Hospital of the Monterey Peninsula. On June 28, 1962, a new 100-bed 210,000 ft (64,000 m) facility costs $3.5 million (equivalent to $37,252,475 in 2025), opened adjacent to the town of Pebble Beach, designed by architect Edward Durell Stone. In 1971, another 72 rooms were added, and a large dome over the Fountain Court was constructed. In 1982, the former Eskaton Monterey Hospital was acquired.

Additional expansions were undertaken in the 1980s and 1990s, including the completion of an outpatient surgery center. Other additions included a Family Birth Center and the construction of other labs and facilities elsewhere in the Monterey area. A three-story underground parking area with space for 316 cars was completed in 2003 under the main entrance of the hospital. In 2002, Community Hospital's new Breast Care Center began operating on Cass Street in Monterey. Outpatient services, including a Sleep Center, outpatient nutrition, radiology, laboratory, and physician offices at the Ryan Ranch campus, opened in 2004.

Much of the hospital has been furnished in accordance with feng shui, a traditional Chinese practice of placement and arrangement of space intended to achieve harmony with the environment.

The hospital offers a variety of treatments and specialties, including:

- Addiction Medicine
- Anesthesiology
- Bone and joint conditions
- Breast disease
- Cancer
- Cardiology
- Cardiothoracic surgery
- Dentistry
- Dermatology
- Diabetes
- Diagnostic radiology
- Emergency Medicine
- Gastroenterology
- Genetics
- Heart disease
- Hematology
- Hospital medicine
- Infectious disease
- Interventional radiology
- Neonatology
- Neurology
- Obesity
- Oncology
- Oral and maxillofacial surgery
- Palliative Medicine/Pain Management
- Pediatrics
- Pregnancy
- Psychiatry
- Sleep medicine
- Urology
- Wounds
