= Railtown 1897 State Historic Park =

Unit of the California State Park System

Coordinates: 37°57′3.54″N 120°25′3.75″W

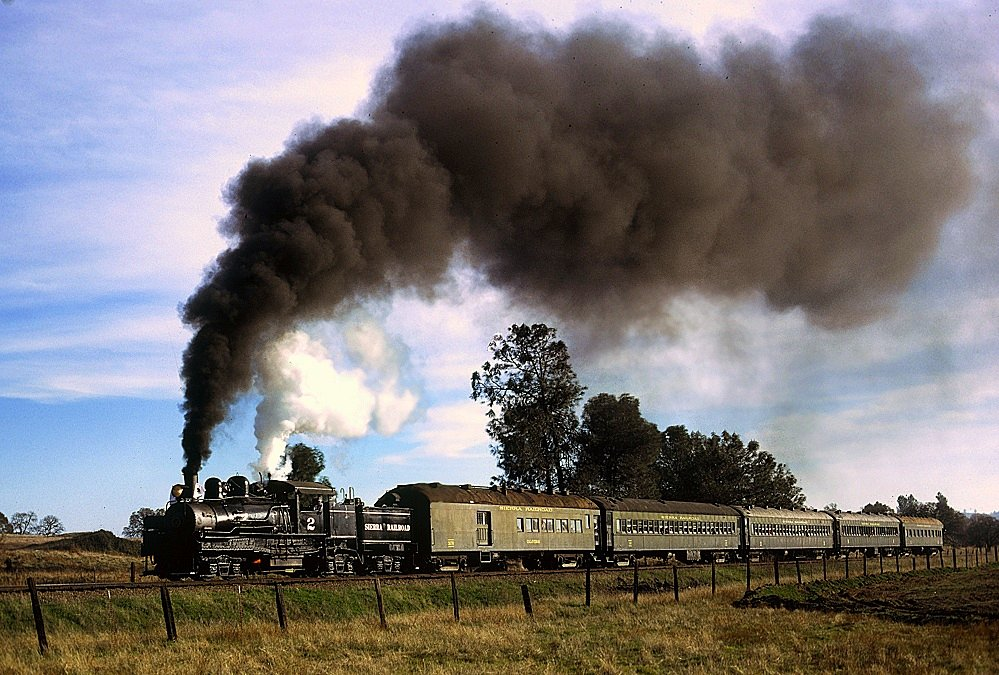
- Shay 2 hauling an excursion train on December 30, 1979

Overview
- Headquarters: Jamestown, California
- Locale: Jamestown, California, U.S.
- Dates of operation: 1971–present

Technical
- Track gauge: 4 ft 8 1/2 in (1,435 mm) standard gauge
- Length: 23.4 mi (37.7 km)

Other
- Website: https://www.parks.ca.gov/railtown

Railtown 1897 State Historic Park, and its operating entity, the Sierra Railway, is known as "The Movie Railroad." Both entities are a heritage railway and are a unit of the California State Park System. Railtown 1897 is located in Jamestown, California. The entire park preserves the historic core of the original Sierra Railway of California (later reincorporated as the Sierra Railroad). The railway's Jamestown locomotive and rolling stock maintenance facilities are remarkably intact and continue to function much as they have for over 100 years. The maintenance facilities are listed on the National Register of Historic Places as the Sierra Railway Shops Historic District.

== History ==
The Sierra Railway served the West Side Lumber Company mill at Tuolumne, as well as the Standard (later Pickering) Lumber Company in Standard, California. The West Side operated an extensive 3 ft (914 mm) narrow gauge logging railroad in the Sierra Nevada range. It operated into the 1960s, and was the last of the narrow-gauge logging railways operating in the American West. The Pickering Lumber Company operated an extensive logging railroad that extended northeast of Standard all the way north to what is now the South Grove of Big Trees State Park.

Since 1929, when The Virginian was filmed with the Sierra No 3, the Sierra Railway properties have been a major resource to the motion picture industry. Over 200 movies, TV shows, and commercials have featured Railtown and its trains. Sierra's tracks, locomotives and cars have long been seen on the silver screen; film credits include Go West with the Marx Brothers, High Noon, 3:10 To Yuma (1957) featured #3 in the end of the movie, as well as Back to the Future Part III. Television programs that regularly used the Sierra property include Wild, Wild West, Iron Horse, Tales of Wells Fargo, and Petticoat Junction. The Sierra No. 3 locomotive and Sierra's coach number 5 were the Hooterville Cannonball. Locomotive No. 3 was also used in numerous episodes of Little House on the Prairie.

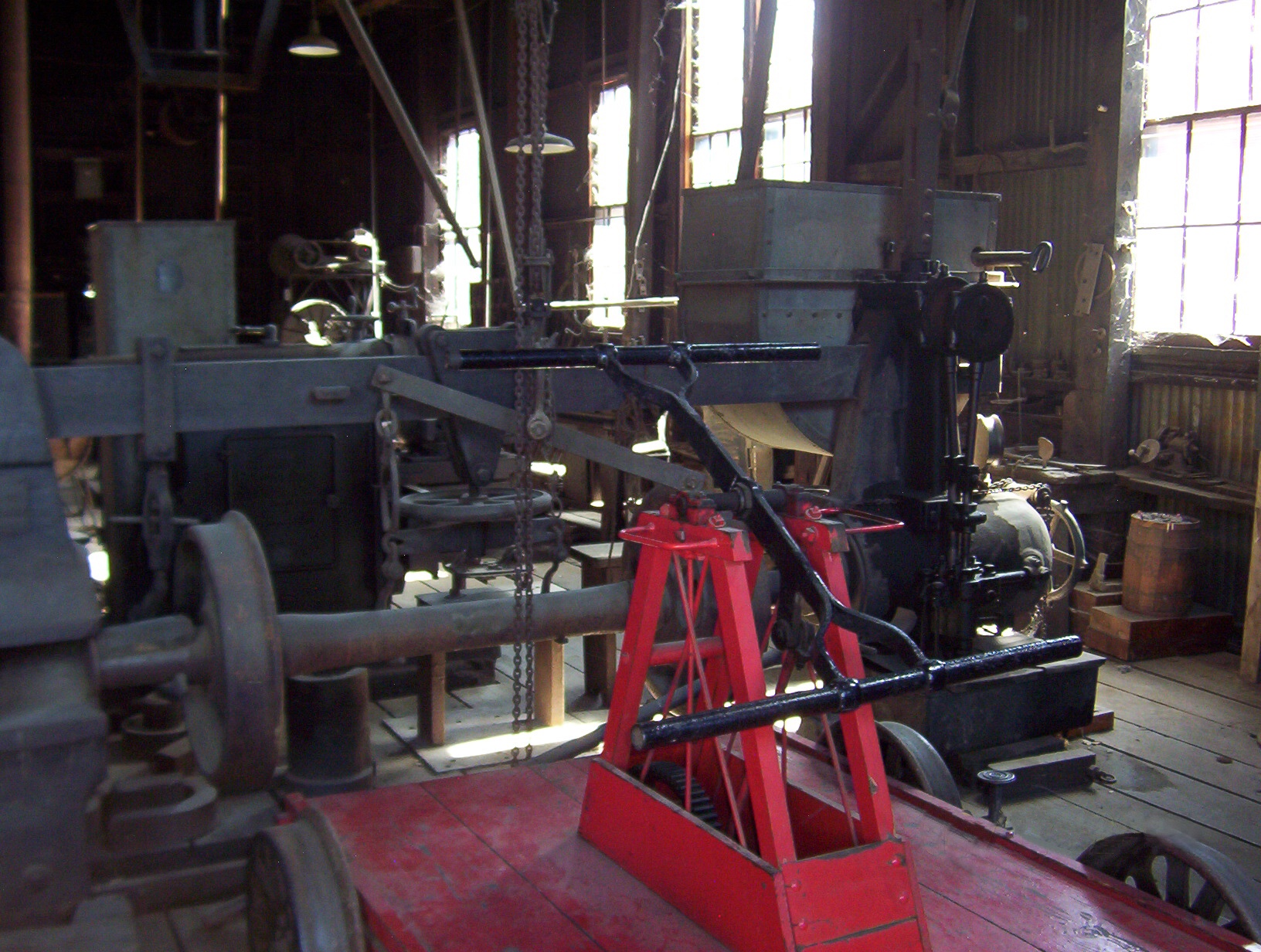
Sierra Railway machine shop. Hand car and wheel press are in foreground. Shaper and engine lathes in background. Machines are driven by an overhead, flat-belt line shaft.

The Railtown 1897 State Historic Park was one of the 48 California state parks proposed for closure in January 2008 by California's Governor Arnold Schwarzenegger as part of a deficit reduction program, though it did not close.

In May 2011, California State Parks announced the closure of Railtown 1897 along with 69 other parks. The closing was anticipated in July 2012, but due to the efforts of locals and enthusiasts, Railtown 1897 remained open and has received funding to make major repairs to the Sierra No. 28, a steam locomotive original to the Sierra Railway and a mainstay of passenger operations for the park.

The California State Railroad Museum (CSRM), headquartered in Old Sacramento, assumed responsibility for Railtown 1897 State Historic Park on July 1, 1992.

== Operations ==
In addition to seasonal steam and diesel-powered train rides, the Railtown experience includes tours of the locomotive roundhouse originally built in 1910, the machine shop, and related exhibits. Movie paraphernalia used in filming train sequences is on display.

Volunteer opportunities are available to help preserve and educate the public about the park. Duties include giving tours of the roundhouse as well as delivering speeches about the locomotives and the surrounding areas while on a short train-ride tour.

== Equipment ==
Locomotive details
| Number | Images | Type | Model | Built | Builder | Status |
|---|---|---|---|---|---|---|
| Unknown | | Diesel | 8-ton switcher | 1930s | Plymouth Locomotive Works | Operational |
| 2 | | Steam | 3-Truck Shay | 1922 | Lima Locomotive Works | Out of service, awaiting restoration |
| 3 | | Steam | 4-6-0 | 1891 | Rogers Locomotive and Machine Works | Operational |
| 7 | | Steam | 3-Truck Shay | 1925 | Lima Locomotive Works | Out of service |
| 28 | | Steam | 2-8-0 | 1922 | Baldwin Locomotive Works | Operational |
| 34 | | Steam | 2-8-2 | 1925 | Baldwin Locomotive Works | Out of service |
| 612 | | Diesel | MRS-1 | 1953 | American Locomotive Company | Out of service, waiting repairs |
| 613 | | Diesel | MRS-1 | 1953 | American Locomotive Company | Out of service, waiting repairs |
| 546 | | Diesel | MRS-1 | 1953 | American Locomotive Company | Out of service, parts locomotive |
| 1265 | | Diesel | RS4TC-1 | 1953 | Baldwin Locomotive Works | Operational |
| 7417 | | Diesel | 45-ton switcher | 1942 | GE Transportation | Out of service, waiting repairs |
| 52280 | | Diesel | 80-ton switcher | 1952 | GE Transportation | Operational |

== See also ==
- List of heritage railroads in California
- List of heritage railways
- List of museums in California

== Bibliography ==
- Warwick Frost (2009). 'Projecting an Image: Film Induced Festivals in the American West'. Event Management 12:2, pp. 95–103.
