= Sierra Railway 28 =

Preserved American 2-8-0 locomotive

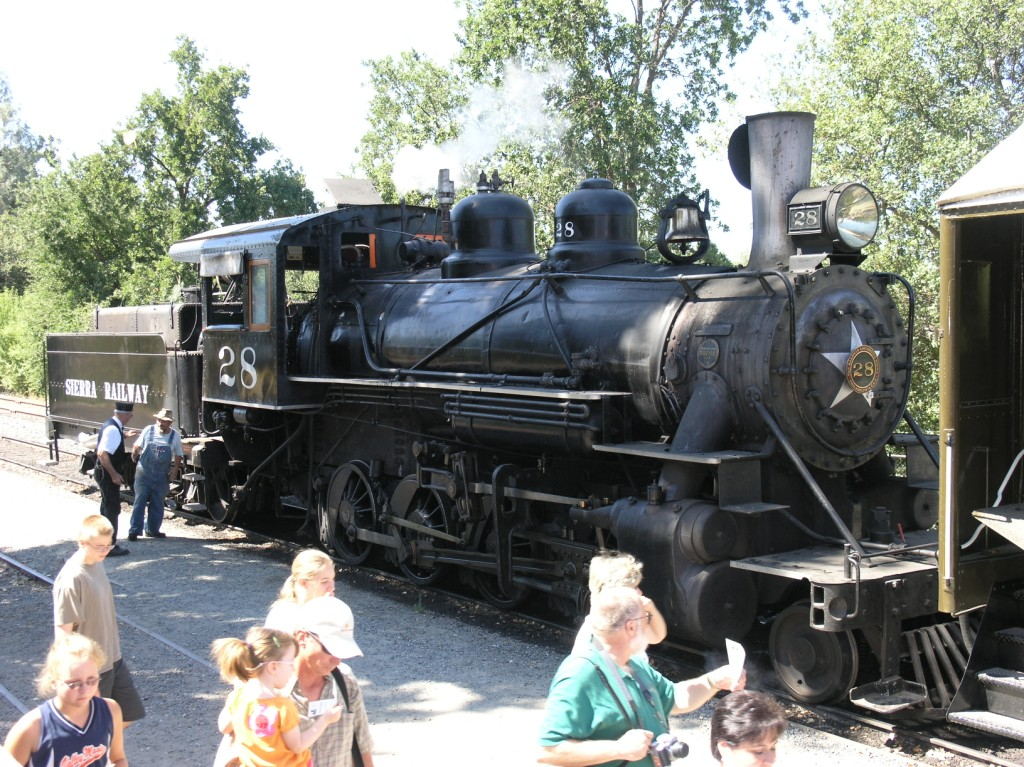
- Sierra Railway 2-8-0 No. 28 at Railtown in 2009
Type and origin
- Power type: Steam
- Builder: Baldwin Locomotive Works
- Serial number: 55246
- Model: 10-32-E
- Build date: January 1922
Specifications
- Configuration
  - Whyte: 2-8-0
  - UIC: 1′D n2G
- Driver dia.: 48 in (1,219 mm)
- Wheelbase: 50.17 ft (15 m)
- Adhesive weight: 127,600 lb (57.9 tonnes)
- Loco weight: 142,000 lb (64.4 tonnes)
- Fuel type: Oil
- Fuel capacity: 2,000 US gallons (7,600 litres; 1,700 imperial gallons)
- Water cap.: 4,000 US gal (15,000 L; 3,300 imp gal)
- Boiler pressure: 180 psi (1.24 MPa)
- Cylinders: Two, outside
- Cylinder size: 19 in × 26 in (483 mm × 660 mm)
- Valve gear: Walschaerts
- Valve type: Piston valves
- Loco brake: Air
- Train brakes: Air
- Couplers: Knuckle
Performance figures
- Tractive effort: 30,750 lbf (136.8 kN)
- Factor of adh.: 4.26
Career
- Operators: Sierra Railroad; Railtown 1897 State Historic Park
- Numbers: SRC 28
- Locale: Central California
- First run: March 7, 1922
- Retired: 1955
- Restored: June 1958
- Current owner: Railtown 1897 State Historic Park
- Disposition: Operational

Sierra Railway 28 is a 2-8-0 "Consolidation" type steam locomotive, owned and operated by the California State Railroad Museum in Jamestown, California.

== History ==
No. 28 was built in January 1922 for the Sierra Railway Company of California by the Baldwin Locomotive Works of Philadelphia, Pennsylvania. It was built in response to the increase of freight traffic on the Sierra with the construction of the Don Pedro and O'Shaughnessy Dams requiring carloads of rock and cement. After the dam projects were finished, the 28 was placed into service on March 7, 1922, and was assigned to freight traffic on the Sierra's lower division between Oakdale and Jamestown, California.

By the 1940s, No. 28 was one of only six remaining locomotives on the Sierra's roster and continued to handle freight and railfan excursions until 1955 when the Sierra purchased two diesel-electric locomotives to replace the steam engines in freight service. However, the Sierra retained No. 28, along with 4-6-0 number 3, 2-8-0 No. 18, 2-8-2 No. 34 and 2-8-2 No. 36 for occasional railfan trips and movie work. No. 28 was returned to operation in June 1958 where it began hauling excursions. All railfan excursions ended on October 19, 1963, after Sierra No. 28 derailed in the Jamestown yard during an excursion outing.

During this time, Sierra No. 28 made several appearances in movies and television shows, including Bonanza, Overland Trail, Nichols, Little House on the Prairie, Bound for Glory, The World's Greatest Lover and Chattanooga Choo Choo.

In May 1971, the Sierra Railroad opened its historic railroad facilities at Jamestown to the public as a tourist attraction called Rail Town 1897. No. 28 became the workhorse of this new tourist operation. In 1979, Crocker & Associates, which owned the Sierra Railroad and Rail Town 1897, decided to sell the Jamestown complex and all of its historic rail equipment, including engine No. 28, to the State of California, which reorganized Rail Town 1897 as Railtown 1897 State Historic Park.

After the State of California took over Railtown's operations, 28 continued to serve as its primary excursion locomotive, operating seasonally from April through October. In February 2009, Sierra No. 28 was taken out of service after its crown sheet and other areas of the firebox were found to be too thin for continued operation. Sierra No. 28 remained stored in the Jamestown roundhouse awaiting restoration funds until August, 2013, when it was torn down for repairs to its firebox.

After being out of service for more than ten years, the 28 returned to operation on June 1, 2019.

== See also ==
- Sierra No. 3, a 4-6-0 also owned by Railtown 1897
- Polson Logging Co. 2
- Columbia River Belt Line 7
