= The Terror (1920 film) =

1920 film

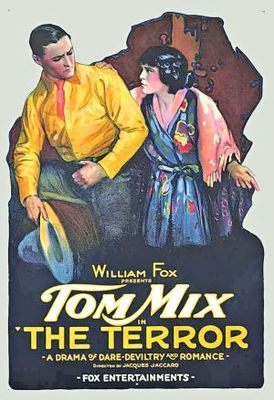
- Theatrical poster
- Directed by: Jacques Jaccard
- Screenplay by: Jacques Jaccard
- Story by: Tom Mix
- Produced by: William Fox
- Starring: Tom Mix; Lester Cuneo; Francelia Billington; Lucille Young; Charles K. French; Wilbur Higby
- Cinematography: Frank B. Good
- Production company: Fox Entertainments
- Release date: May 29, 1920
- Running time: 5 reels
- Country: United States
- Languages: Silent; English intertitles

The Terror is a lost 1920 American silent Western film starring Tom Mix, Francelia Billington, and Lester Cuneo. The film was produced by William Fox and directed and written by Jacques Jaccard, and was based on a story written by Mix.

== Plot ==
Mix plays a Deputy U.S. Marshal working in a gold mining camp in the Sierra Nevada. His antagonist is Con Norton (Lester Cuneo) who owns a dance hall. Mix learns that a group of robbers working for Norton are planning to steal a gold shipment, and engages in a brawl with them, swinging on a chandelier. Mix's horse, Tony, helps him win the fight. There is also a gunfight on a steam locomotive, which is shown in the publicity photos.

== Cast ==
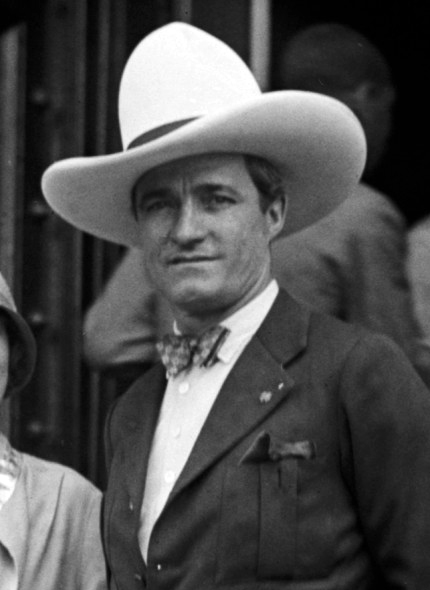
Tom Mix

- Tom Mix
- Lester Cuneo
- Francelia Billington
- Lucille Young
- Joseph Bennett
- Charles K. French
- Wilbur Higby

== Production ==
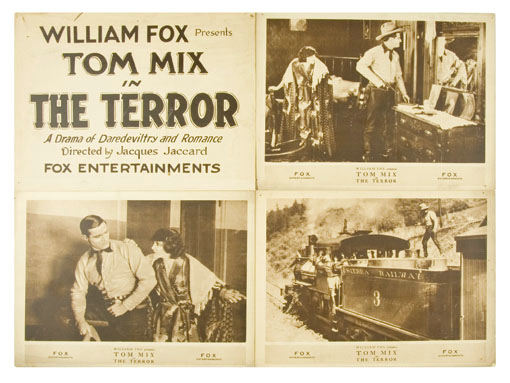
Lobby card for The Terror showing railroad scene at the lower right

The railroad scenes were filmed in the Jamestown, California area, and featured the steam locomotive Sierra No. 3 in its first of many movie appearances. The locomotive is shown in a publicity still for the film.

During the filming, actors Billington and Cuneo first met, and they soon married. They divorced in 1925, and Cuneo committed suicide a few days later.

== Release ==
The studio was Fox Entertainments. It was a five reel film, and was released in May 1920. Marketing slogans for the film included "The daredevil of the screen in a masterpiece of speed, stunts and thrills", and "A Drama of Daredeviltry and Romance".

== Reception ==
A newspaper critic for the Kentucky New Era wrote in 1920:

Tom Mix marks up another winner. Not only does the star hold his audience spell bound, but he has a photoplay that is a genuine "corker". "The Terror" is the story of the rush for gold in the Sierra Nevada mountains, and the picture, without question is the most thrilling Mix has done this season. Anyone who loves the great western outdoor life should not miss seeing "The Terror".

== Preservation ==
With no holdings located in archives, The Terror is considered a lost film.
