= Davis Roberts =

American actor (1917–1993)

- Davis Roberts in Mission Impossible 1967
- Born: Robert A. Davis; March 7, 1917; Mobile, Alabama, U.S.
- Died: July 18, 1993 (aged 76); Chicago, Illinois, U.S.
- Occupation: Actor
- Years active: 1946–1989

Davis Roberts (born Robert A. Davis; March 7, 1917 – July 18, 1993) was an American character actor whose career spanned five decades, from the late 1940s until just before his death in 1993. He started out making films in the 1940s and 1950s and expanded into television work in the following decades. Davis was known for his dignified portrayals which were often in contrast to prevailing stereotypical roles. He played the role of Dr. Caldwell in three episodes in the second and third seasons of the NBC-TV sitcom series Sanford and Son, and as Dr. Ozaba in the 1968 episode "The Empath" in the original Star Trek series.

He was active off-screen as well, serving several terms on the western advisory board of Actors' Equity Association. As one of the officers of Beverly Hills-Hollywood Branch of the NAACP he helped present the first Image Awards in 1967.

== Death ==
Davis died in the home of his brother Charles on July 18, 1993, of emphysema at the age of 76.

== Filmography ==
Year	Title	Role	Notes
1947	The Long Night	Freddie	
1949	Knock on Any Door	Jim 'Sunshine' Jackson	Uncredited
1949	The Great Dan Patch	Smiler	Uncredited
1950	In a Lonely Place	Flower Shop Employee	Uncredited
1950	No Way Out	Heckler at Riot Meeting	Uncredited
1951	Tarzan's Peril	Emissary	Uncredited
1951	The Lion Hunters	Lohu	
1951	The Harlem Globetrotters	Frank	Uncredited
1952	Phone Call from a Stranger	Henry	Uncredited
1952	Red Ball Express	Pvt. Dave McCord	
1953	Jungle Drums of Africa	Native Ambusher	Serial, [Ch.1]
1953	Jamaica Run	Rob	Uncredited
1954	The Glenn Miller Story	Black Man	Uncredited
1956	Female Jungle	George	
1958	God's Little Acre	Farm Hand with Hoe	
1958	Murder by Contract	Hall of Records Clerk	
1960	All the Fine Young Cannibals	Darl	Uncredited
1962	Sweet Bird of Youth	Fly	Uncredited
1964	The Killers	Maître D'	
1964	Quick Before It Melts	Military Man	
1966	The Chase	Roy	Uncredited
1967	Hotel	Dr. Elmo Adams	
1968	Lionheart	Corporal	
1969	Hook, Line & Sinker	Member - Board of Inquiry	Jerry Lewis comedy; uncredited
1970	Halls of Anger	Mr. Willis	
1970	The Great White Hope	Pastor	Uncredited
1972	Sanford and Son	Dr. Caldwell	
1972	Glass Houses		
1973	The Trial of the Catonsville Nine	Prosecutor	
1973	Westworld	Supervisor	
1973	Detroit 9000		
1974	Willie Dynamite	Judge #2	
1976	From Noon till Three	Sam	
1977	Demon Seed	Warner	
1977	Billy Jack Goes to Washington	2nd Handwriting Expert	
1981	Honky Tonk Freeway	James	
1984	Chattanooga Choo Choo	Woodrow	
1990	To Sleep with Anger	Okra Tate	
1993	The Gifted		(final film role)
