= Chattanooga Choo Choo (film) =

- Directed by: Bruce Bilson
- Written by: Robert Mundy; Stephen Phillip Smith
- Produced by: George Edwards; Jill Griffith; Phil Borack (Executive Producer)
- Starring: Barbara Eden; George Kennedy; Melissa Sue Anderson; Joe Namath
- Cinematography: Gary Graver
- Edited by: Bud S. Isaacs
- Music by: Nelson Riddle
- Distributed by: April Fools Productions
- Release date: May 25, 1984
- Running time: 102 minutes
- Country: United States
- Language: English
- Budget: $4.5 million

Chattanooga Choo Choo is a 1984 American comedy film starring Barbara Eden, George Kennedy, Melissa Sue Anderson and Joe Namath, directed by Bruce Bilson which was released on May 25, 1984. The film is inspired by the popular 1941 song "Chattanooga Choo Choo" originally recorded by the Glenn Miller Orchestra and featured in the 20th Century Fox film Sun Valley Serenade.

The film follows the story of football team owner Bert (George Kennedy) who will inherit one million dollars from a railroad tycoon if he can successfully drive a steam train from New York City to its namesake of Chattanooga, Tennessee in 24 hours. He invites his girlfriend Maggie (Barbara Eden) and his team on the train, who invite their own guests and pick up new ones along the trip. The comedy is derived from numerous delays along the way.

The film's promotional tagline is: The song that kept America chuggin' along is this summer's funniest movie!

== Plot ==
The Chattanooga Choo Choo Railroad has been the entire life of its current owner Alonzo Dillard (Parley Baer), who is celebrating his 75th birthday with his daughter Estelle (Bridget Hanley), his granddaughter Jennie Waters (Melissa Sue Anderson), Jennie's fiancé Paul Cartwright (Christopher McDonald), and much of the staff of the Chattanooga Choo Choo Railroad including chief porter Woodrow (Davis Roberts). Protagonist Bert Waters (George Kennedy), Estelle's husband and Jennie's father, is late because he's spending time with his "girlfriend" Maggie Jones (Barbara Eden), whom he plans to marry after divorcing Estelle.

Once Bert does arrive, Alonzo refuses to talk to him, having no patience for tardiness. Bert is, however, able to introduce Jennie to Mason Foresight (James Horan), Duke of Chalfont; and give Jennie pictures that show Paul asleep next to two attractive twins. Jennie vows not to speak to Paul ever again to Estelle's chagrin and Bert's joy.

Alonzo dies shortly afterward and is buried in a Boxcar. By the time his will and testament are read, Jennie has become engaged to the Duke. The will leaves $100,000 and a full pension for Woodrow; $5,000,000 for Jennie; and his property and company to Estelle.

For Bert, the will sets the condition that he must prove he can be on time by restoring and conducting the Historic Chattanooga Choo Choo locomotive (Sierra Railway 28) and full consist (two heavy 1900s compartment, one diner, and one club Pullman cars) from Pennsylvania Station in New York, to Chattanooga Station, adhering to its historic time table. He must arrive in exactly 24 hours to secure the $1,000,000 Alonzo has left him.

On his way to tell Maggie, he runs into a biker gang who make fun of his love for lavender. He has his body guard, Hashimoto (Professor Tanaka), destroy their Harley-Davidson chopper.

Bert turns the ride into a boisterous publicity stunt for his new football team, coached by Newt Newton (Joe Namath), which Bert has founded and risked all his capital in, under the assumption he can secure the winning bid for the city's future football stadium over Sam Cartwright (Clu Gulager), Paul's father. The spectacle will end with a grand wedding for Jennie and the Duke at the Railway Museum.

The departure doesn't quite go as planned, as Sam and Paul Cartwright have bought tickets to come along, Estelle is left behind in a phone booth which Jennie finds unforgivable, Maggie sneaks onto the train and starts falling for Newt while insisting she knows the Duke from somewhere, and Hashimoto forgets Bert's luggage in the run-in with the Cartwrights. Sam discovers how Bert can be so sure of winning: he has bribed an inside man to remove the Cartwright bid and bring it along on the train.

Norman (John Steadman), the train's Fireman and Pee Wee (Paul Brinegar), the Train's Engineer, discover they're a little rusty, and have trouble communicating on account of Norman having gone half-deaf since they last drove the train, and Pee Wee having gone half-blind. This causes the train to lose 15 minutes off the time table, so Bert instructs Woodrow to order them to skip Philadelphia, an optional stop. Unfortunately, Estelle was hoping to get on at Philadelphia; and Sam, who has recovered his bid, was hoping to get off.

Meanwhile, Paul gets the chance to talk to Jennie and she starts to suspect the pictures may be faked. The twins from the picture are on the train, as they are part of the cheer-leading squad of the football team.

Football player Jim-Bob (Curtis Taylor, uncredited) pranks Bert with laxative, which makes him toss his pants out the window. With no luggage, he is forced to deliver his whistle-stop press conference in Washington, D.C. station in a skirt. Bert has Hashimoto restrain Sam so he cannot get off and cuts the press conference short, putting them back on schedule. Estelle manages to get on and Bert rushes to hide Maggie in Jim-Bob's compartment so Estelle won't see her. There, Maggie discovers Jim-Bob has drilled a peephole to see into the cheerleaders' compartment.

The next morning sees the railroad deliver Bert's luggage using an adapted Ford Model T, but most of it falls, leaving him only with the pants. Maggie shows the peephole to the cheerleaders, and she has an idea to get even. Using her mascara applicator, she spreads super glue on Jim-Bob's side of the hole. Then they intentionally talk loudly so he knows they're there and will start watching, and pretending they don't know about the peephole, Maggie directs them through a striptease. Jim-Bob's eyelid gets glued to the wall, which makes him pull the emergency brake, putting them behind schedule again.

Maggie also finds where Sam is being kept and tells Paul, who radios for an ultralight plane to land on the train so Sam can deliver his bid in time, and helps convince Hashimoto to let Newt take Sam's place. So the plane can get enough lift, Sam uses Woodrow's radio to order more speed from the locomotive, which eventually puts the train ahead of schedule.

Bert goes check on Hashimoto and "Sam" and, finding Maggie, tells her Newt is "just a washed-up ball-player" which makes both of them leave him. Estelle walks in on the argument and, spotting Maggie, declares she, too, is leaving Bert.

Maggie remembers where she knows the Duke from: he's a con artist from Memphis called Bob Shoemaker. The football team proceeds to force him to confess in front of Jennie and some Trainspotters, which finally makes her and Paul get back together.

As everyone celebrates that they're arriving early, the train encounters a road block by the biker gang, who are using Bert's car to demand a replacement Harley. Bert dispatches the football team to disperse them. These antics, however result in their arrival at Chattanooga two minutes late. Bert tries to haggle by setting his watch back, but the executor is absolute: he gets nothing.

The large party that was waiting to receive him, leaves. Sam informs him that Bert has lost the bid. The wedding preparations are used to marry Jennie to Paul and Maggie to Newt. It is implied Hashimoto quits after receiving a racial slur and Bert is forced to walk back to the roadblock to retrieve his car, alone; but upon returning with it, one of the cheerleaders takes interest in his car, and it is implied Bert will marry her for her money, as he did with Estelle.

== Cast ==
- Barbara Eden as Maggie Jones, the narrator and Bert's lover. She constantly points out to the other passengers normal elements of the train-riding experience that match the 1941 song, much to their annoyance.
- George Kennedy as Bert Waters, the antihero.
- Melissa Sue Anderson as Jennie, Bert and Estelle's daughter.
- Joe Namath as Newt Newton, coach of Bert's football team who falls for Maggie.
- Bridget Hanley as Estelle Waters, Bert's wife
- Christopher McDonald as Paul Cartwright, Jennie's former fiancé pining to win her back.
- Clu Gulager as Sam Cartwright, Paul's father who sees Bert as his foil.
- Davis Roberts as Woodrow, the train's Conductor and Chief Porter
- John Steadman as Norman, the train's half-deaf Fireman
- Paul Brinegar as Pee Wee, the train's half-blind Engineer
- Tony Azito as Lucky Pierre, the train's waiter famed for having never dropped a tray in his life.
