= Back to the Future Part III =

1990 film by Robert Zemeckis

- Theatrical release poster by Drew Struzan
- Directed by: Robert Zemeckis
- Screenplay by: Bob Gale
- Story by: Robert Zemeckis; Bob Gale
- Based on: Characters by: Robert Zemeckis; Bob Gale
- Produced by: Bob Gale; Neil Canton
- Starring: Michael J. Fox; Christopher Lloyd; Mary Steenburgen; Thomas F. Wilson; Lea Thompson
- Cinematography: Dean Cundey
- Edited by: Arthur Schmidt; Harry Keramidas
- Music by: Alan Silvestri
- Production company: Amblin Entertainment
- Distributed by: Universal Pictures
- Release date: May 25, 1990
- Running time: 118 minutes
- Country: United States
- Language: English
- Budget: $40 million
- Box office: $245.1 million

Back to the Future Part III (stylized as Back to the Future III) is a 1990 American science fiction Western film directed by Robert Zemeckis and starring Michael J. Fox, Christopher Lloyd, Mary Steenburgen, Thomas F. Wilson, and Lea Thompson. It is the sequel to Back to the Future Part II (1989) and the third installment of the Back to the Future trilogy.

The story continues immediately after the previous film; while stranded in 1955 during his time travel adventures, Marty McFly (Fox) discovers that his friend Dr. Emmett "Doc" Brown (Lloyd) is trapped in 1885 and was killed by Biff's great-grandfather Buford "Mad Dog" Tannen (Wilson). Marty travels to 1885 with the intent of rescuing Doc and then returning to 1985, but matters are complicated when Doc falls in love with Clara Clayton (Steenburgen). It was filmed in California and Arizona, and was produced on a $40 million budget back-to-back with Part II.

Back to the Future Part III was released in the United States on May 25, 1990, six months after the previous installment, and grossed $245 million worldwide during its initial run, making it the sixth-highest-grossing film of 1990. The film received a positive response from critics, who noted it as an improvement over Part II.

== Plot ==
On November 12, 1955, moments after witnessing Emmett "Doc" Brown disappear in his DeLorean, Marty McFly learns that Doc was sent 70 years into the past to 1885. (Note: As depicted in Back to the Future Part II (1989).) Using information from Doc's 1885 letter, Marty and the 1955 Doc find and repair the DeLorean, hidden away by Doc in 1885, so that Marty can return to 1985. After finding it, Marty comes across a tombstone inscribed with Doc's name, erected by the town's then-new schoolteacher Clara Clayton, stating that Doc was killed by Biff Tannen's great-grandfather, Buford "Mad Dog" Tannen, over 80 dollars, six days after writing the letter.

Despite the letter's warning, Marty travels to September 2, 1885, to save Doc, arriving in the middle of a cavalry pursuit of Native Americans. Marty evades the pursuit, but damages the car's fuel line. Chased by a bear, he is knocked unconscious and found by his Irish-born great-great-grandparents Seamus and Maggie McFly, who allow him to stay the night. The next morning, under the alias Clint Eastwood, Marty arrives in a newly founded Hill Valley but runs afoul of Buford and his gang. Doc rescues Marty from Buford's attempted lynching. Doc agrees to leave 1885 after learning his fate, but without gasoline, the DeLorean cannot reach 88 miles per hour (142 kilometers per hour) to time-travel. He proposes using a steam locomotive to push the DeLorean to that speed.

While inspecting a rail spur, Doc saves Clara from falling into the ravine, averting her death from the original timeline. They fall in love. At a town festival, Buford tries shooting Doc, but after Marty intervenes, Buford challenges him to a showdown in two days by calling him "yellow". Doc Brown urges Marty not to react to provocation, letting it slip that Marty's impulsiveness causes a life-changing accident in the future.

Although reluctant to return to 1985, Doc visits Clara to end their relationship and bid her goodbye. She dismisses his story about being from the future. Doc attempts a drinking binge, but passes out after one drink. Buford arrives for Marty, who sees his alias appear in the tombstone photograph and refuses to duel. A revived Doc is captured by Buford's gang, forcing Marty to duel. Marty uses a stove door as a bulletproof vest to survive Buford's shot and, in the ensuing fistfight, knocks Buford into a wagon of manure. Buford and his gang are then arrested for an earlier robbery.

On the train to San Francisco, Clara learns of Doc's heartbreak and runs back to town. She finds the model time machine at his shop and realizes Doc was telling the truth. Doc and Marty use the locomotive to push the DeLorean along the spur line. Clara boards the locomotive and loses her footing. Marty, in the DeLorean, passes his hoverboard to Doc, who uses it to save Clara. The DeLorean hits 88 mph and vanishes as the locomotive plunges from the unfinished bridge.

Arriving back in 1985 on October 27, Marty escapes the disabled DeLorean as a freight train destroys it. Reuniting with his girlfriend Jennifer Parker, Marty declines a street race with Needles, not knowing that he had avoided the accident Doc warned him about. Jennifer opens the fax message she kept from 2015 and watches the text regarding Marty's firing disappear.

As Marty and Jennifer examine the DeLorean wreckage, a steam locomotive time machine appears, operated by Doc, Clara, and their children. Doc gives Marty a photo of them standing next to the town clock in 1885. When Jennifer asks Doc about the blank fax, he says it means their future has not yet been written and encourages them to "make it a good one". Doc and his family bid farewell and fly off in the locomotive.

== Cast ==
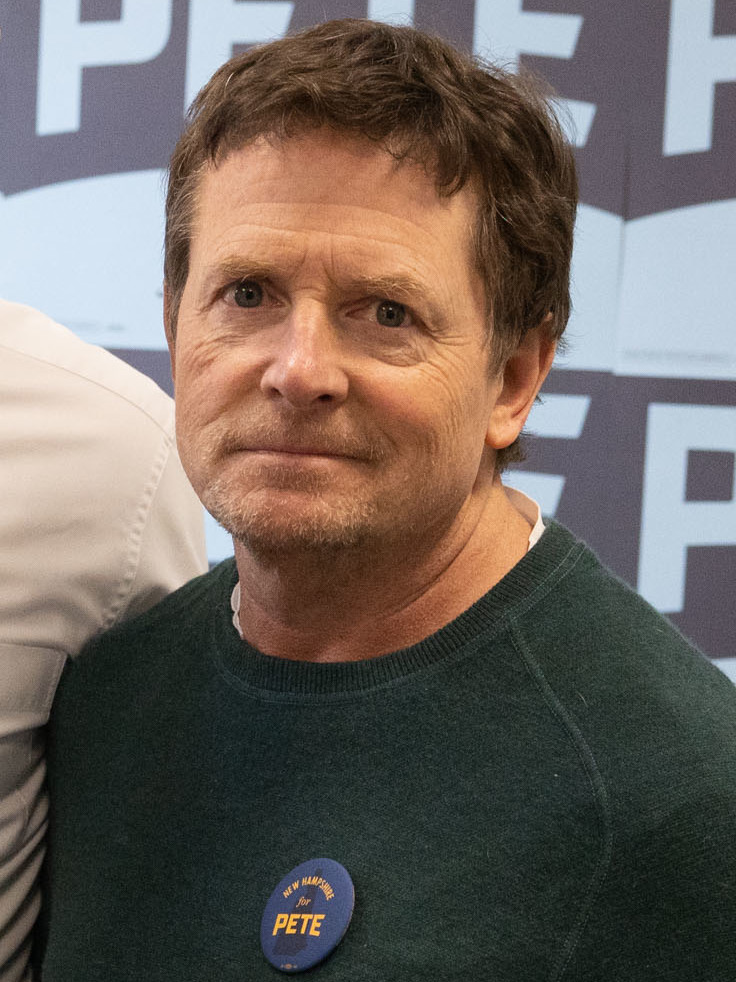
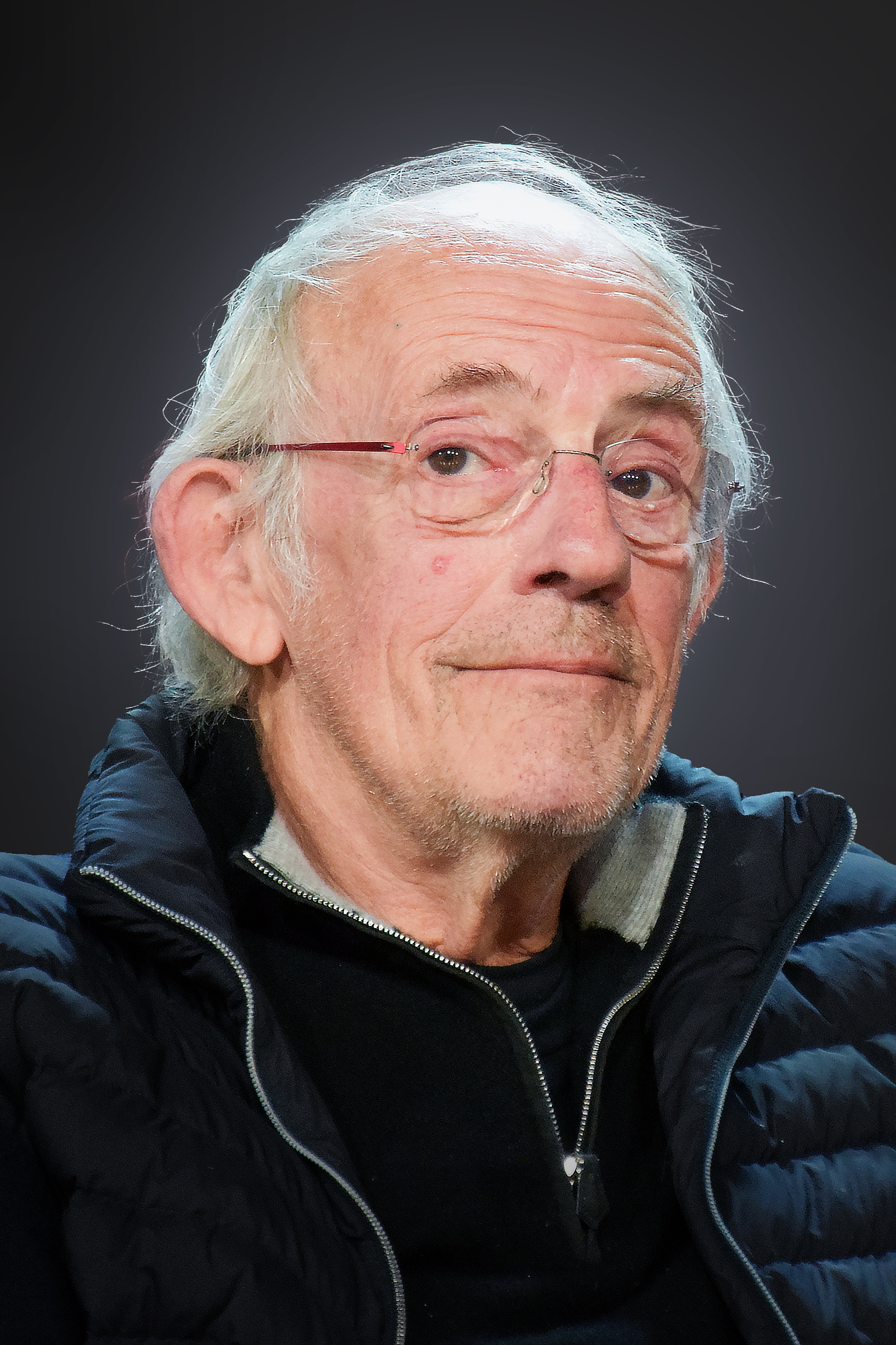
Michael J. Fox in 2020 (left) and Christopher Lloyd in 2022
- Michael J. Fox as:
  - Marty McFly
  - Seamus McFly
- Christopher Lloyd as Emmett "Doc" Brown
- Mary Steenburgen as Clara Clayton
- Thomas F. Wilson as:
  - Biff Tannen
  - Buford "Mad Dog" Tannen
- Lea Thompson as:
  - Lorraine McFly
  - Maggie McFly

Returning actors from previous films include Elisabeth Shue and Flea as Jennifer Parker and Douglas J. Needles, as well as Marc McClure, Wendie Jo Sperber and Jeffrey Weissman as Dave, Linda and George McFly, respectively. James Tolkan, who played Mr. Strickland in the first two films, plays his ancestor Marshal James Strickland.

Buford's gang in 1885 is portrayed by Christopher Wynne, Sean Gregory Sullivan, and Mike Watson. Wynne also plays a member of Needles' gang in 1985, alongside J. J. Cohen and Ricky Dean Logan, who played Skinhead and Data, respectively, in previous films.

Chester the bartender is played by Matt Clark, Richard Dysart plays a barbewire salesman, and three elderly patrons of the saloon are played by veteran Western film actors Pat Buttram, Harry Carey, Jr. and Dub Taylor. Hugh Gillin, Burton Gilliam, Donovan Scott and Bill McKinney portray Hill Valley's mayor, a gun salesman, Strickland's deputy, and an engineer respectively. Todd Cameron Brown and Dannel Evans play Doc and Clara's sons Jules and Verne Brown, and Lindsay Vail Clark portrays William McFly, Marty's great-grandfather. Frank Beard, Billy Gibbons and Dusty Hill of ZZ Top cameo as the band at the Festival.

== Production ==
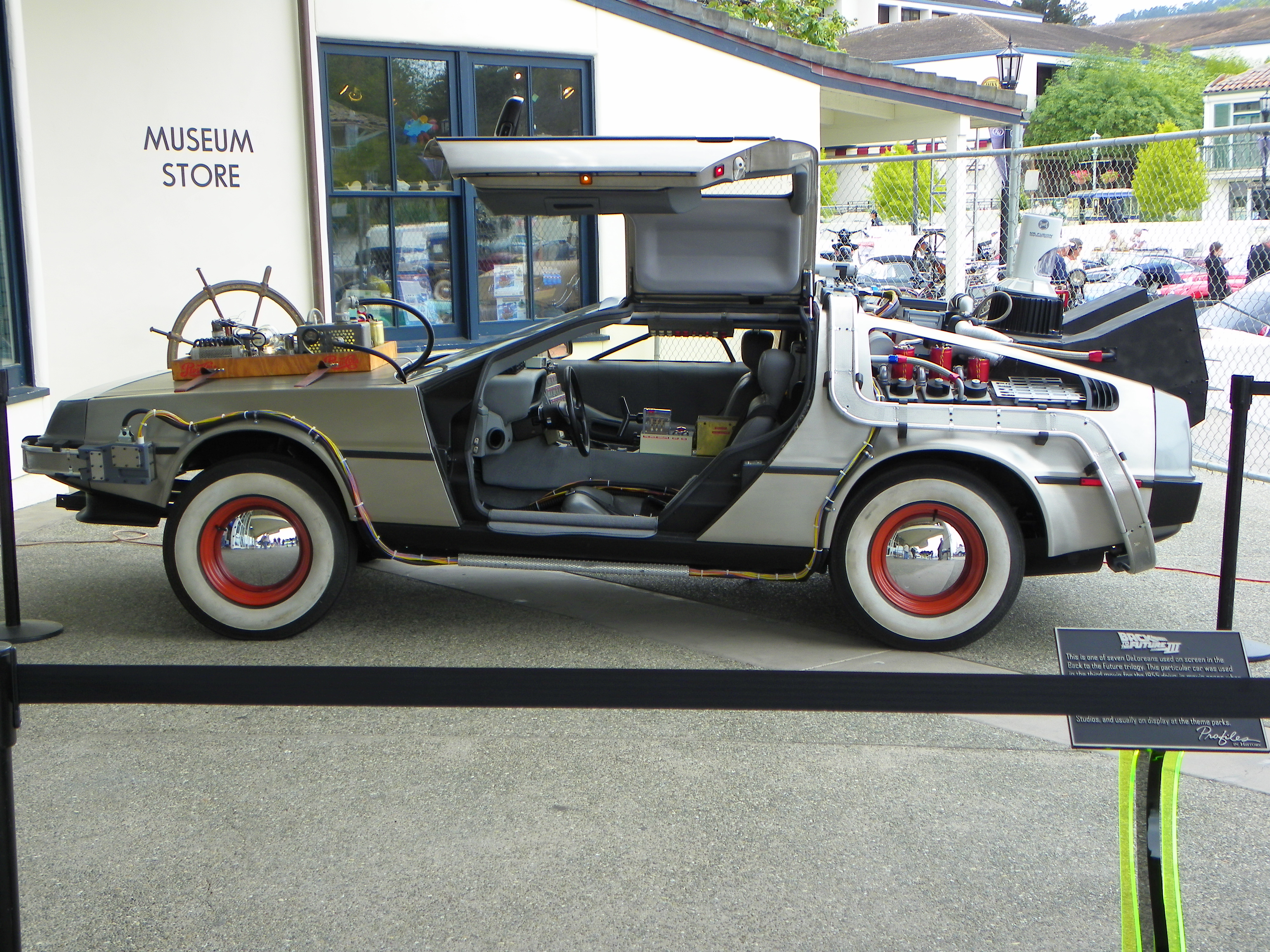
One of the DeLorean vehicles used in the film

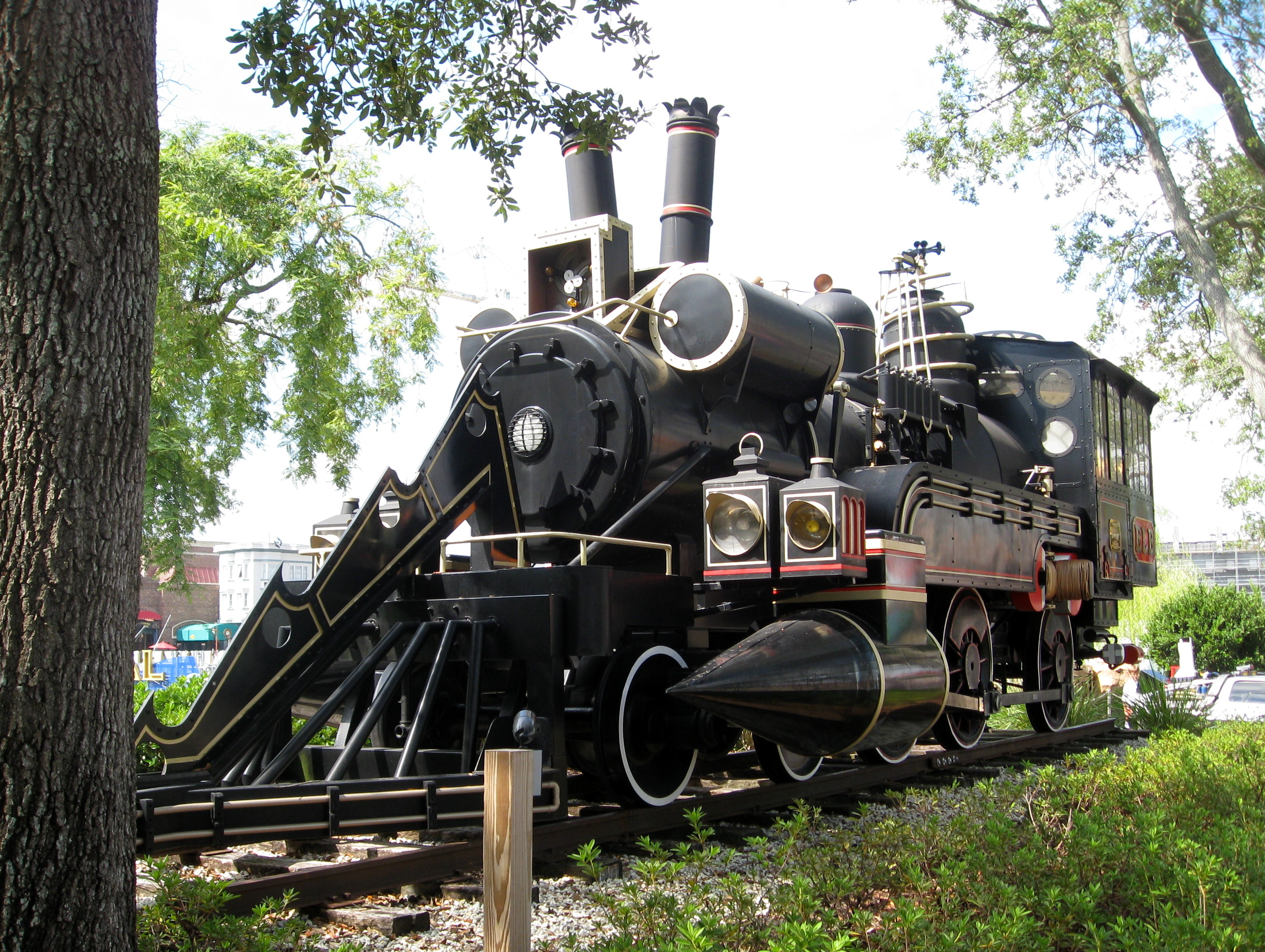
The Time Train used at the end of the film on display at Universal Studios Florida

Train pushing a Delorean at the Fairplex Garden Railroad in Pomona California

The origins of the Western theme for Back to the Future Part III lay in the production of the original Back to the Future film. During filming for the original, director Robert Zemeckis asked actor Michael J. Fox what time period he would like to see. Fox replied that he wanted to visit the Old West and meet cowboys. Zemeckis and writer/producer Bob Gale were intrigued by the idea, but held it off until Part III. Rather than use existing sets, the filmmakers built the 1885 Hill Valley from scratch. The western scenes were filmed on location in Oak Park, California and Monument Valley. Some of the location shooting for the 1885 Hill Valley was done in Jamestown, California and on a purpose-built set at the Red Hills Ranch near Sonora, California. Some of the train scenes were filmed at Railtown 1897 State Historic Park, a heritage line in Jamestown.

The shooting of the Back to the Future sequels, which were shot back-to-back throughout 1989, reunited much of the crew of the original. The films were shot over the course of eleven months, save for a three-week hiatus between filming of Parts II and III, and concluded in January 1990. The most grueling part was editing Part II while filming Part III, and Zemeckis bore the brunt of the process over a three-week period. While Zemeckis was shooting most of the train sequences in Sonora, Gale was in Los Angeles supervising the final dub of Part II. Zemeckis would wrap photography and board a private plane to Burbank, where Gale and engineers would greet him on the dubbing stage with dinner. He would oversee the reels completed that day, and make changes where needed. Afterwards, he would retire to the Sheraton Universal Hotel for the night. The following morning, Zemeckis would drive to the Burbank Airport, board a flight back to the set in Northern California, and continue to shoot the film.

Although the schedule for most of the personnel involved was grueling, the actors found the remote location for Part III relaxing, compared to shooting its predecessor.

The role of Clara Clayton was written with Mary Steenburgen in mind. When she received the script, she was reluctant to commit to the film until her children, who had loved the first film, "hounded" her.

The Hill Valley Festival Dance scene proved to be the most dangerous for Lloyd and Steenburgen; overzealous dancing left Steenburgen with a torn ligament in her foot.

The film featured cameo appearances from veteran Western film actors Pat Buttram, Harry Carey Jr. and Dub Taylor as three "saloon old timers". The inclusion of these noticeable Western actors was promoted in several documentaries about the film, as well as the behind-the-scenes documentary of the DVD and in the obituary of one of the actors. Zemeckis considered having Ronald Reagan play the part of the Mayor of Hill Valley in 1885. Reagan, who in 1989 had recently finished his second term as president, had appeared in several Westerns during his earlier career as an actor before pursuing a career in politics and had not appeared in a motion picture since 1964 in which he starred in The Killers. Zemeckis personally contacted Reagan's agent Lew Wasserman, to gauge the ex-president's interest in the role, which Reagan declined.

Shooting a film set in the Old West was appealing to the stuntmen, who were all experienced horse riders. Gale recalled in 2002 that many stuntmen in Hollywood wanted to work on Part III. Thomas F. Wilson, who played Buford Tannen, opted to perform his own stunts instead of using a stunt double and spent a great deal of time learning to ride a horse and throw his lariat. Filming was paused when Fox's father died, and when his son was born.

Alan Silvestri returned to compose the score for Back to the Future Part III, continuing his longtime collaboration with Zemeckis. Rather than dictate how the music should sound, Zemeckis directed Silvestri as he would an actor, seeking to evoke emotion and treating every piece of music like a character. The musicians of the Old West-style band in the film were played by American rock band ZZ Top.

The photography in Part III was a "dream" for cinematographer Dean Cundey, who shared with much of the crew his excitement to shoot a Western. Zemeckis wished to create a spectacular climax to the film. He coordinated the actors, a live 4-6-0 ten wheeler steam locomotive (the Sierra Railway 3), pyrotechnics, and special effects, and countless technicians all at once. As they had done with the previous two films in the trilogy, the visual effects for Part III were managed by effects company Industrial Light & Magic; the head of its animation department, Wes Takahashi, returned to once again animate the DeLorean's time travel sequences.

== Music ==
The soundtrack was released under Varèse Sarabande on May 29, 1990, and features much of the score by Alan Silvestri and the orchestral version of the song "Doubleback" performed at the festival in 1885 during the film. A two-disc special edition was released on October 12, 2015, in commemoration of the film's 25th anniversary, which includes the original score (26 tracks) on disc one and an arrangement of alternate cues and source music on a second disc.

== Release ==
=== Home media ===
On November 8, 1990, MCA/Universal Home Video released Back to the Future Part III on VHS and on December 17, 2002, on DVD. It debuted on Blu-ray in 2010 for the film's 20th anniversary, followed by a second Blu-ray remaster in 2015 for the film's 25th anniversary and a 4K Blu-ray remaster in 2020 for the film's 30th anniversary.

== Reception ==
=== Box office ===
The film grossed $23 million in its first weekend of U.S. release and $87.6 million altogether in U.S. box office receipts (or about $190.6 million adjusted as of 2025) – $246 million worldwide.

=== Critical response ===
On the review aggregator website Rotten Tomatoes, 79% of 48 critics' reviews are positive, with an average rating of 6.8/10. The website's consensus reads: "Back to the Future Part III draws the trilogy to a satisfying close with a simpler, sweeter round of time-travel antics." Metacritic, which uses a weighted average, assigned the film a score of 55 out of 100, based on 19 critics, indicating "mixed or average" reviews. Audiences polled by CinemaScore gave the film an average grade of "A−" on an A+ to F scale, same as the second installment.

Kim Newman of Empire gave the film four out of five stars, saying that the film "restores heart interest of the first film and has a satisfying complete storyline". He praised Michael J. Fox for "keeping the plot on the move" and mentioned that Christopher Lloyd and Mary Steenburgen's romance was "funny". He said that the film's ending was the "neatest of all" and it "features one of the best time machines in the cinema, promising that this is indeed the very last in the series and neatly wrapping it up for everybody".

Leonard Maltin preferred this film to the first two, giving it three-and-a-half stars out of four in his Movie Guide, praising the film as "great fun, dazzling special effects, and imagination to spare", also saying that the movie magic works in the film. Michael McWhertor of the website Polygon wrote that while the film was not better than the original entry in the series, it is nonetheless "leagues better than the second"; he praised the film's comedic and romantic elements, and commended Thomas F. Wilson's performance as "Mad Dog" Tannen.

Roger Ebert of the Chicago Sun-Times gave the film two-and-a-half out of four stars. He said that the film's western motifs are "a sitcom version that looks exactly as if it were built on a back lot somewhere". Although Vincent Canby of The New York Times praised Christopher Lloyd's performance in the film, he also said that the film "looks as if it could be the beginning of a continuing television series". He complained that the film is "so sweet-natured and bland that it is almost instantly forgettable".

Commentators noticed parallels between Part III and the film Time After Time (1979). Mary Steenburgen has said:

Actually, I've played the same scene in that film [Time After Time] and in [Back to the Future Part III]…. I've had a man from a different time period tell me that he's in love with me, but he has to go back to his own time. My response in both cases is, of course, disbelief, and I order them out of my life. Afterwards, I find out I was wrong and that, in fact, the man is indeed from another time, and I go after him (them) to profess my love. It's a pretty strange feeling to find yourself doing the same scene, so many years apart, for the second time in your career.

The casting of Steenburgen for Back to the Future Part III appears to be deliberately intended to mirror the earlier role. In Time After Time, the woman lives in the 20th century and the time traveler is from the 19th. In Back to the Future Part III, the woman inhabits the 19th century and the time traveler is from the 20th.

=== Accolades ===
In 1990, the film won a Saturn Award for Best Music for Alan Silvestri and a Best Supporting Actor award for Thomas F. Wilson. In 2003, it received an AOL Movies DVD Premiere Award for Best Special Edition of the Year, an award based on consumer online voting.

== Future ==
Co-writer and director Robert Zemeckis and co-writer Bob Gale, who have an agreement with Spielberg and Amblin that any further installments in the Back to the Future franchise will not be made without their involvement, have stated that another film is "not going to happen". Gale commented that he did not wish to see another film in the series without the Marty McFly character nor any other actor than Michael J. Fox playing him, while acknowledging that Fox's current health condition would make this impossible. He illustrated this at a 2008 fan convention in Florida, stating: "The idea of making another Back to the Future movie without Michael J. Fox – you know, that's like saying, 'I'm going to cook you a steak dinner and I'm going to hold the beef.'" Gale also said that the Telltale video-game adaptation is the closest thing to what a fourth film could be like. In an interview on October 21, 2015, the day of Marty McFly's purported arrival in the future, Christopher Lloyd stated that he would consider making a fourth film under the condition that the original cast and creative team returned, along with a story "worth telling". The same day, Lloyd reprised his role as Doc Brown in a brief segment in which the character returns with a special message marking the 2015 date. In 2020, actor Tom Holland claimed in an interview with BBC Radio 1 that he was approached by an unnamed producer over a possible reboot of the franchise with him starring the lead role as Marty McFly (or a similarly new character). However, Holland stated that he was reluctant to take up this offer as he described the existing films as "perfect films", though he would be interested in re-creating scenes from the films in a deep-fake homage video or short film.

== See also ==
- List of 1990 box office number-one films in the United States
