= Standard, California =

Unincorporated community in California, United States

- Unincorporated community
- Location within California Location within the United States
- Coordinates: 37°58′00″N 120°18′43″W
- Country: United States
- State: California
- County: Tuolumne
- Elevation: 2,287 ft (697 m)
- Time zone: UTC-8 (Pacific (PST))
  - Summer (DST): UTC-7 (PDT)
- ZIP code: 95373
- Area code: 209
- GNIS feature ID: 1659855

Standard is an unincorporated community in Tuolumne County, California, United States that lies 4 miles (6.4 km) east-southeast of Sonora. Its post office, opened in 1910, is assigned ZIP code 95373. Standard was established as a company town for the Standard Lumber Company. Standard was a station on the former Sierra Railway, now Sierra Northern Railway the depot has survived and is currently in use as a nursery (19071 Standard Road) and a grocery (19073). Sierra Pacific Industries operates a mill in Standard.
