= Oakdale Branch =

Short Union Pacific railway line

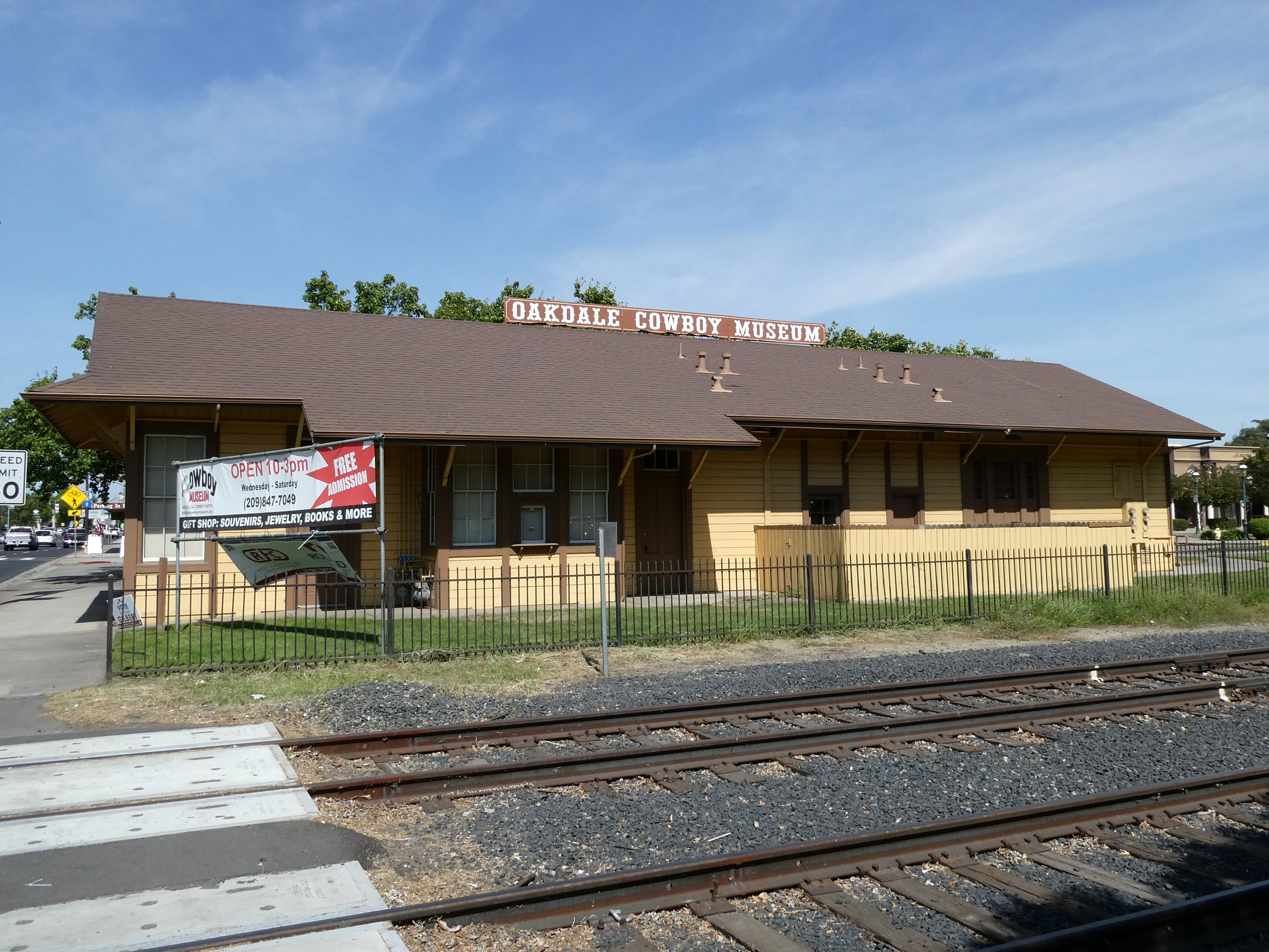
The Oakdale Cowboy Museum in Oakdale, housed in the former Southern Pacific railway station

The Oakdale Branch is a short Union Pacific railway line in and around Oakdale, California. The existing segment is the remnant of a much longer line, which traversed the east side of the San Joaquin Valley between Merced and Stockton. The line is isolated from the rest of the Union Pacific network, relying on interchanges with the Sierra Railroad for operations.

The first segment of the railway built was the Stockton and Visalia Railroad branch line from the Stockton and Copperopolis Railroad line at Peters to Oakdale. Both of those railroads would go on to be absorbed into the Central Pacific Railroad in 1885, shortly after the branch became operational. The Southern Pacific extended the line from Oakdale to Merced in early 1891. Passenger services ceased in 1938, with the railroad only running regular freight trains twice weekly between Stockton and Oakdale and on-demand south to Merced. Abandonment began in 1942 when the southernmost 21 miles (34 km) of the line was removed after years of low productivity. Further segments were torn up through the 1980s, leaving a very short line around Oakdale.

Two points of interest on the line are the former SP station building on F street and the Wigwag railroad crossing signal on East E Street.

Union Pacific was running trains along the line six days per week in 2022 at peak tomato season.
