= Sierra Railway 3 =

Preserved 4-6-0 steam locomotive in Jamestown, California

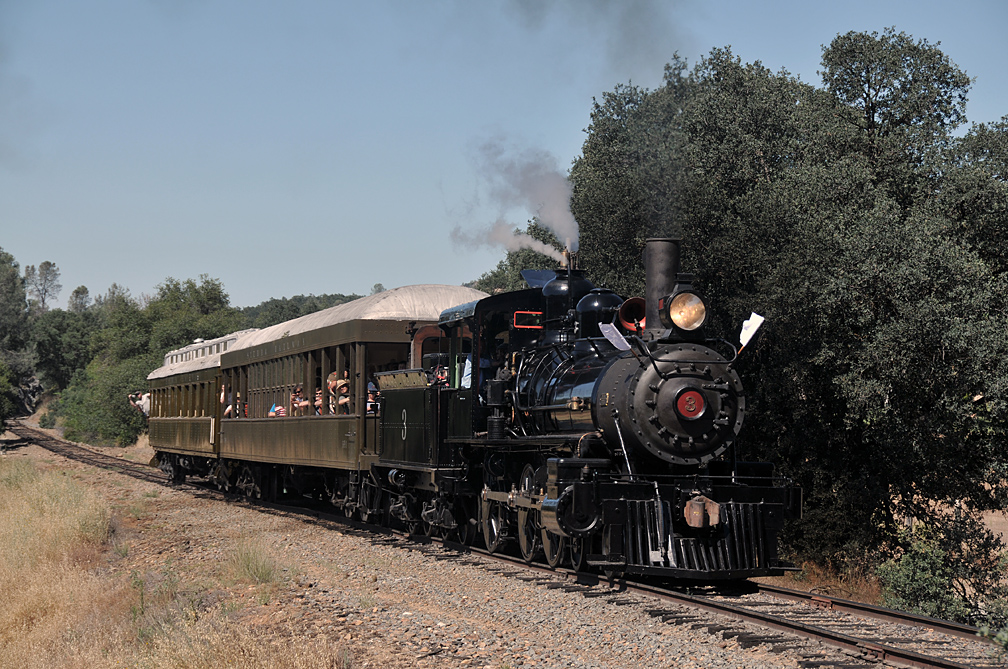
- Sierra Railway No. 3 hauling its first train on July 3, 2010, after its overhaul
Type and origin
- Power type: Steam
- Builder: Rogers Locomotive and Machine Works
- Serial number: 4493
- Build date: March 26, 1891
Specifications
- Configuration
  - Whyte: 4-6-0
  - UIC: 2'C
- Gauge: 4 ft 8 1/2 in (1,435 mm) standard gauge
- Leading dia.: 2 ft 2 in (660 mm)
- Driver dia.: 4 ft 8 in (1,422 mm)
- Fuel type: New: Coal; Now: Oil
- Boiler pressure: 150 psi (1,000 kPa)
- Cylinders: Two, outside
- Cylinder size: 17 in × 24 in (432 mm × 610 mm)
- Valve gear: Stephenson
- Valve type: Slide valves
- Loco brake: Air
- Train brakes: Air
- Couplers: Knuckle
Performance figures
- Tractive effort: 17,470 lbf (77,710 N)
Career
- Operators: Prescott & Arizona Central Railway; Sierra Railroad; Railtown 1897 State Historic Park
- Numbers: PACR 3; SRC 3
- Official name: W.N. Kelly
- Retired: 1932
- Restored: 1948
- Current owner: Railtown 1897 State Historic Park
- Disposition: Operational
- Sierra Railway Locomotive No. 3
- U.S. National Register of Historic Places
- NRHP reference No.: 100009468
- Added to NRHP: October 23, 2023

Sierra Railway 3, often called the "Movie Star locomotive", is a 19th-century 4-6-0 "Ten-wheeler" type steam locomotive owned by the State of California and preserved and operated by the Railtown 1897 State Historic Park in Jamestown, California.

William L. Withhuhn, the former Transportation History curator at the Smithsonian Institution, described the locomotive's historical and cultural significance:

Sierra Railway No. 3 has appeared in more motion pictures, documentaries, and television productions than any other locomotive. It is undisputedly the image of the archetypal steam locomotive that propelled the USA from the 19th century into the 20th.

Built in 1891, the locomotive returned to operation in July 2010 after a 14-year absence from service and a three-year-long overhaul, requiring the replacement of its original boiler. It was listed on the National Register of Historic Places in 2023.

== History ==
=== Revenue service ===
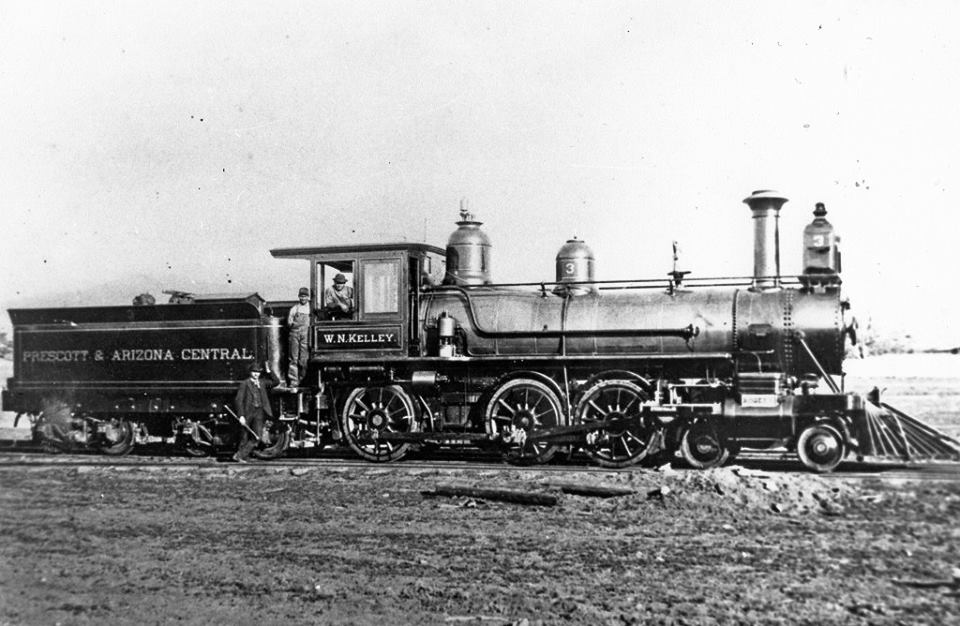
No. 3 on the P&AC in 1897

No. 3 was built by the Rogers Locomotive and Machine Works of Paterson, New Jersey. Construction of the locomotive was completed on March 26, 1891, and was given Rogers' construction number 4493. It has 17 in × 24 in (43 cm × 61 cm) cylinders, 56-inch (140 cm) driving wheels and weighs 50 short tons (45 t) in working order. It was built for the Prescott & Arizona Central Railway (P&AC) as their locomotive #3 and named W.N. Kelley after the company's treasurer.

The P&AC went bankrupt in 1893 and its chief promoter, Thomas S. Bullock, relocated much of its equipment and hardware to California, including the No. 3. He then entered into a partnership with Prince André Poniatowski and William H. Crocker, and together in 1897 they incorporated the Sierra Railway Company of California to connect Oakdale, California with the mining and timber producing regions of Tuolumne County and Calaveras County.

The locomotive became Sierra No. 3 (dropping the W. N. Kelley name) and played a key role in the construction of the railroad to Jamestown, California in 1897, Sonora, California in 1899 and Tuolumne, California in 1900. It was the primary locomotive pulling freight trains on the railroad until 1906, when the Sierra Railway purchased a new Baldwin Locomotive Works 2-8-0 locomotive. It played a significant role in passenger and freight hauling operations in the Sierra foothills during the early development of Tuolumne County.

Originally built as a coal-fired locomotive, Sierra No. 3 was converted to burn oil sometime between 1900 and 1902.

Sierra No. 3 was involved in several wrecks. In February 1898, a switch mishap killed conductor William G. Bailey. In September 1899, its tender derailed while backing up on a trestle, causing it to collapse.

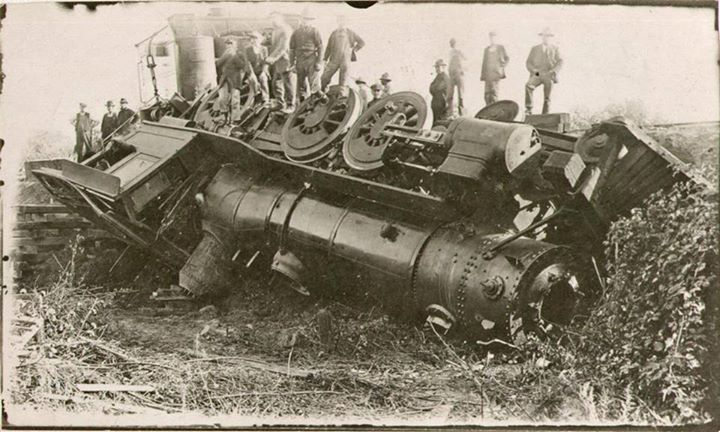
No. 3's 1918 derailment that destroyed the original wooden cab

The locomotive turned on its side in 1918 just above Sonora, destroying its original wooden cab, which was replaced with a new Southern Pacific steel cab in February 1919. Two years later, Sierra No. 3 made it first known Hollywood film appearance, in a silent film The Terror starring Tom Mix.

=== Excursion service ===
During the Great Depression, the original Sierra Railway Company of California went into bankruptcy, and was reorganized as the Sierra Railroad Company in 1937. Sierra No. 3 was taken out of service in 1932, and parked on a siding in the Jamestown yard for 15 years. It managed to avoid being scrapped during World War II, and again received attention from Hollywood in 1945, when David O. Selznick, the producer of Duel in the Sun being filmed on the Sierra Railroad, proposed to destroy it in a train wreck scene for the movie. The Sierra Railroad's Master Mechanic Bill Tremewan persuaded railroad management not to consider a notion so "ridiculous" and instead allowed shop crews to restore the locomotive to operation for charter and movie service.

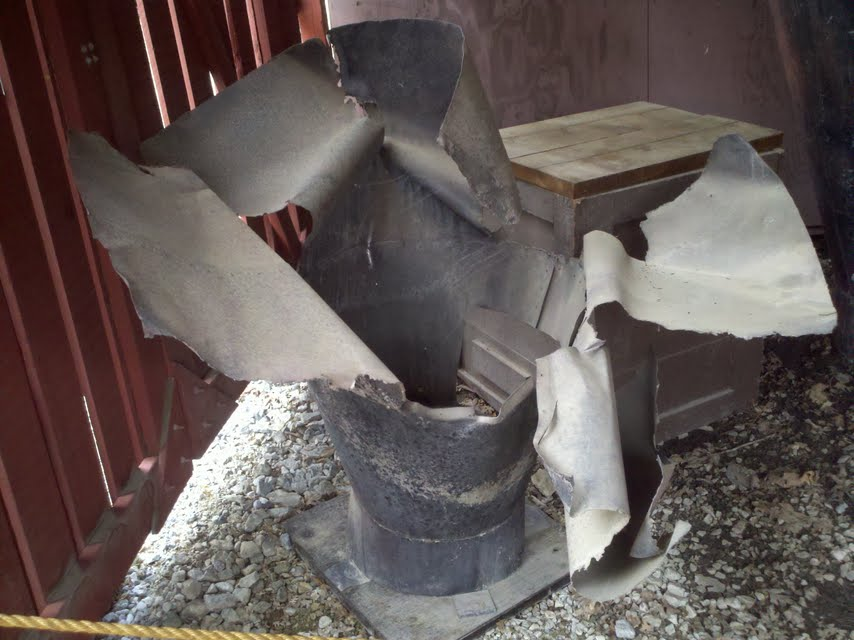
The smokestack prop used in the locomotive explosion scene in Back to the Future Part III

Inspection of the boiler proved it was in serviceable condition; however, the resulting work required a reduction of the Maximum Allowable Working Pressure from 160 to 150 psi (1.10 to 1.03 MPa). The rebuild was completed in 1948, and the locomotive officially returned to service heading a Pacific Coast Chapter, Railway and Locomotive Historical Society sponsored excursion train on May 30 that year. Over the next half-century, Sierra No. 3 pulled excursion trains and appeared in dozens of films, TV shows, and commercials. Among them were High Noon in 1952, for which Gary Cooper won the Academy Award for Best Actor, and Unforgiven, starring and directed by Clint Eastwood, which won the Academy Award for Best Picture for 1992.

The locomotive was often redecorated for various movie and television appearances, one of its most famous roles being the Hooterville Cannonball from the mid-1960s series Petticoat Junction. False smokestacks were also often installed to alter the appearance of the locomotive.

In 1979, Crocker and Associates announced their intention to sell the railroad to Silverfoot, Inc. based in Chicago, Illinois, but the deal did not include the historic steam era shop facilities in Jamestown. The complex, including Sierra No. 3, was acquired by the State of California as a result of legislation passed in April 1981, and signed by Governor Jerry Brown. The acquisition was completed on September 15, 1982, and since then, the locomotive has been the property of the State of California. In 1991, No. 3 turned 100 years old, and in May, it was moved to Sacramento to take part in "Railfair '91", an event that celebrated the tenth anniversary of the grand opening of the California State Railroad Museum.

In 1995, the Federal Railroad Administration issued new safety standards for steam locomotive boilers following the Gettysburg Railroad incident. In order to comply with these revised regulations, Sierra No. 3 was removed from service until a complete evaluation of the locomotive's condition could be made.

=== 21st-century renovation ===
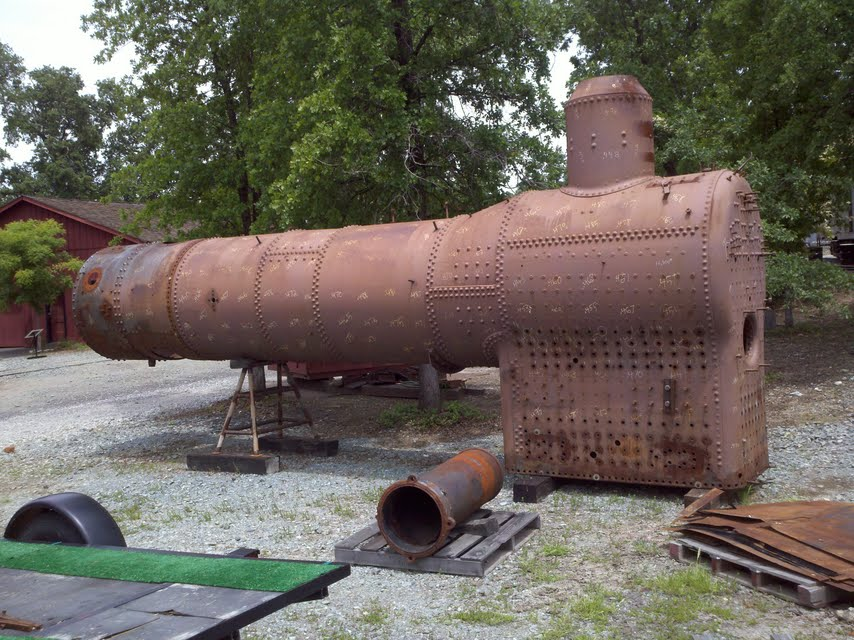
No. 3's original boiler that was replaced during a rebuild, in 2011

Preliminary repairs were completed in 2000–2001 with deferred maintenance funding from the State of California. This included dismantling the locomotive. The project progressed very slowly until 2007, when a major fundraising campaign began. At that time, the budget for the project was estimated at US$600,000, based on the assumption the existing boiler could be saved.

In a fundraising appeal, Clint Eastwood described Sierra No. 3 as "like a treasured old friend." Eastwood had ridden the locomotive early in his career on the TV series Rawhide, and later used the locomotive in his own movie productions Pale Rider and Unforgiven. Eastwood wrote, "Sierra No. 3 resides at Railtown 1897 State Historic Park. It is housed in the original roundhouse which is still in use. Together these two assets provide a rare opportunity to experience history just as it was 109 years ago." Funding for the renovation project was provided by the California Cultural and Historical Endowment, the Irving J. Symons Foundation, the Sonora Area Foundation, the California State Parks Foundation, the Teichert Foundation, DuPont and many individual donors.

The rebuild included boring out the cylinders and turning the drive wheel tires on a lathe. When work on the disassembled locomotive resumed, and the boiler was inspected thoroughly by ultrasound testing, it was discovered that a new boiler was necessary. Its old lap seam design made retrofitting it to modern standards too costly, and the risk of the boiler losing its historical integrity was a risk Railtown staff decided not to take. Engineering drawings and other technical assistance needed to build a new boiler were provided by the Strasburg Rail Road in Lancaster County, Pennsylvania. The old boiler was shipped to the Chelatchie Boiler Works of Camas, Washington to be used as a reference. Chelatchie fabricated a new welded boiler for the No. 3 at a cost of US$600,000. Following the completion of the new boiler, both boilers were shipped to the historic Southern Pacific shops in Sacramento, California and fitted on the original frame. The locomotive was then moved via truck back to Jamestown, California for final assembly.

The 1920s were selected as the restoration period for the locomotive to represent. The final cost of the restoration was US$1.6 million; the locomotive officially returned to service on July 3, 2010. In 2023, No. 3 was taken out of service to undergo its Federal Railroad Administration (FRA) 1,472-day inspection and overhaul, it returned to service on April 30, 2025 and made its return to excursion service on July 12.

== Movie appearances ==
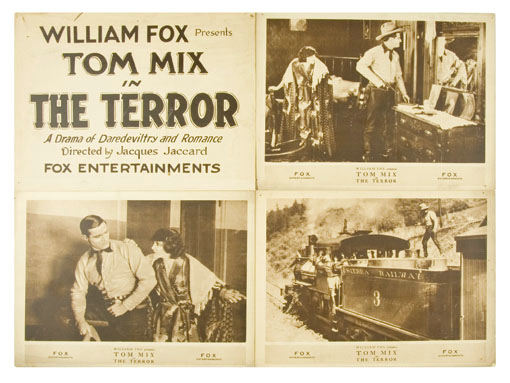
Lobby card for 1920 Tom Mix movie The Terror shows No. 3 in the fourth panel.

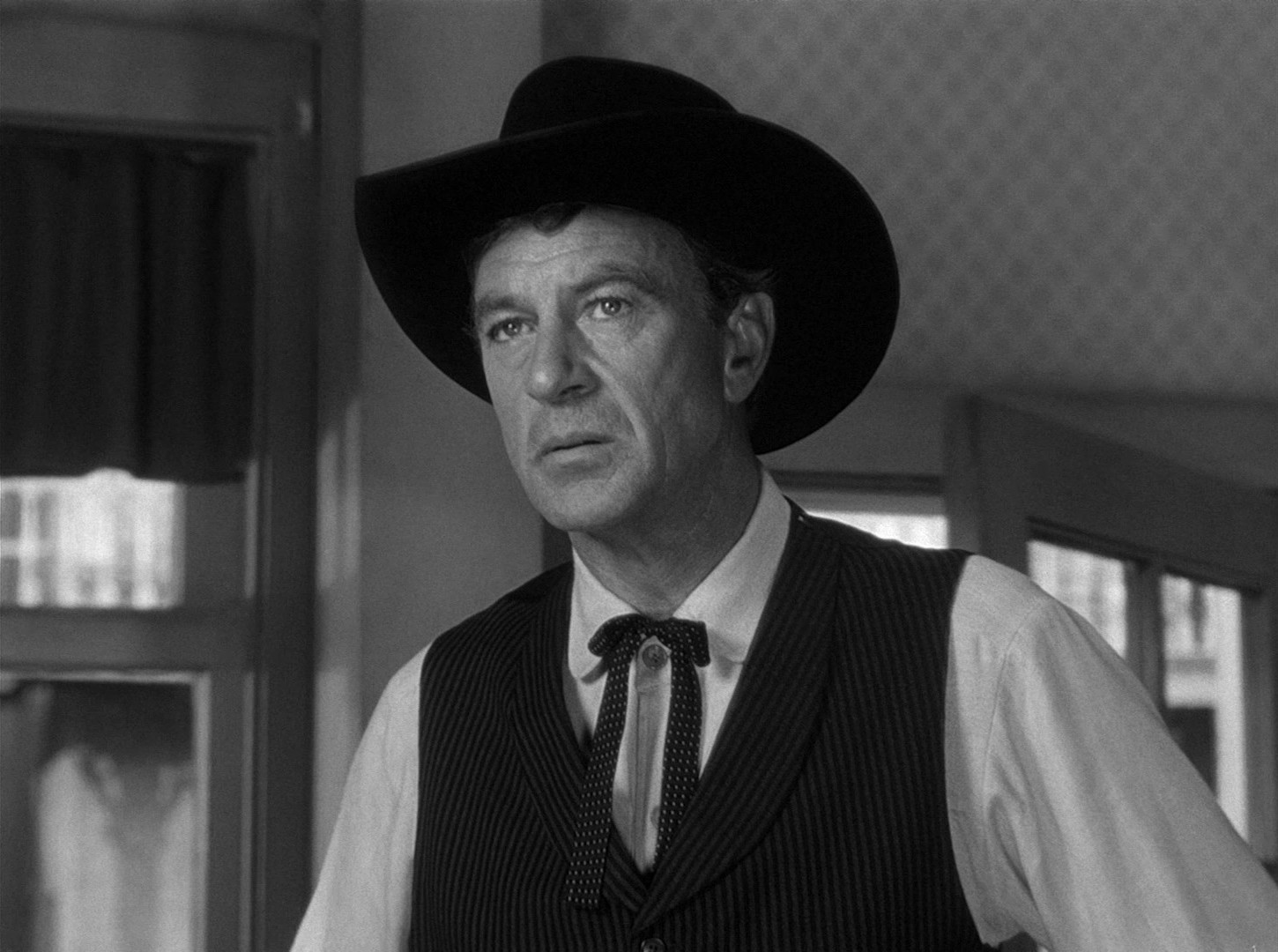
Gary Cooper, seen here in High Noon, appeared in four movies with Sierra No. 3.

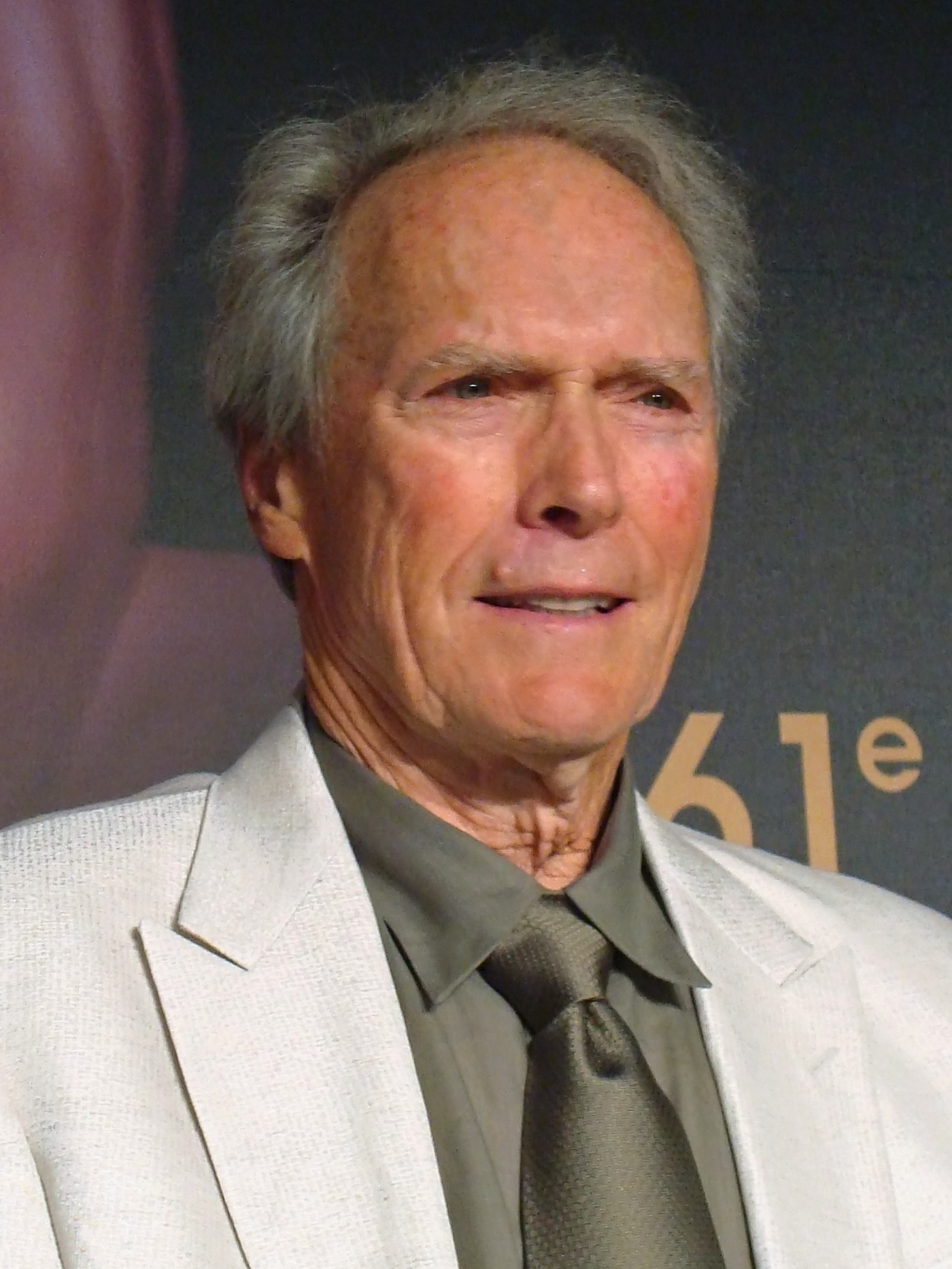
Clint Eastwood, who appeared in two movies and a TV series with Sierra No. 3, wrote a letter supporting fundraising for the renovation of the locomotive.

Sierra No. 3 has appeared in many movies. According to Movie Railroad Historian Larry Jensen, those which were filmed using Sierra No. 3 include the following:

- The Terror, 1920, starring Tom Mix
- The Virginian, 1929, starring Gary Cooper and Walter Huston. This was the first talkie filmed on location rather than on a studio sound stage.
- The Texan, 1930, starring Gary Cooper and Fay Wray
- The Conquerors, 1932, starring Richard Dix and Ann Harding
- Laughter in Hell, 1933, starring Pat O'Brien and Gloria Stuart
- Wyoming Mail, 1950, starring Stephen McNally, Howard Da Silva and Ed Begley
- Sierra Passage, 1950, starring Wayne Morris and Lola Albright
- Drums in the Deep South, 1951, starring James Craig and Guy Madison
- The Cimarron Kid, 1952, starring Audie Murphy and James Best
- High Noon, 1952, starring Gary Cooper, Grace Kelly and Katy Jurado.
- Kansas Pacific, 1953, starring Sterling Hayden and Eve Miller.
- The Moonlighter, 1953, starring Barbara Stanwyck, Fred MacMurray, William Ching and Ward Bond.
- Rage at Dawn, 1955, starring Randolph Scott and Forrest Tucker
- The Return of Jack Slade, 1955, starring John Ericson, Neville Brand and Angie Dickinson
- Texas Lady, 1955, starring Claudette Colbert and Barry Sullivan
- The Big Land, 1957, starring Alan Ladd, Virginia Mayo and Edmond O'Brien
- Man of the West, 1958, starring Gary Cooper, Julie London and Lee J. Cobb
- Face of a Fugitive, 1959, starring Fred MacMurray, Dorothy Green and James Coburn
- The Outrage, 1964, a remake of Rashomon as a western, starring Edward G. Robinson, Paul Newman, Laurence Harvey, Claire Bloom and William Shatner
- The Great Race, 1965, starring Jack Lemmon, Tony Curtis and Natalie Wood
- The Rare Breed, 1966, starring James Stewart, Maureen O'Hara and Brian Keith
- The Perils of Pauline, 1967, starring Pat Boone and Terry-Thomas - Sierra Railroad train sequence cut from final film.
- Finian's Rainbow, 1968, starring Fred Astaire and Petula Clark
- A Man Called Gannon, 1968, starring Tony Franciosa and Michael Sarrazin
- The Great Bank Robbery, 1969, starring Zero Mostel and Kim Novak.
- Joe Hill, 1971, a biopic about the IWW activist Joe Hill, starring Thommy Berggren. The film won the Jury Prize at the 1971 Cannes Film Festival.
- The Great Northfield Minnesota Raid, 1972, starring Cliff Robertson and Robert Duvall
- Oklahoma Crude, 1973, starring George C. Scott and Faye Dunaway
- Bound for Glory, 1976, a biopic of Woody Guthrie, starring David Carradine and Randy Quaid. This was the first major film to use the Steadicam, and Haskell Wexler won the Academy Award for Best Cinematography for the film, and the film also won another Academy Award.
- Nickelodeon, 1976, starring Ryan O'Neal, Burt Reynolds and Tatum O'Neal
- The Apple Dumpling Gang Rides Again, 1979, starring Tim Conway and Don Knotts
- The Long Riders, 1980, starring teams of brothers including James Keach and Stacy Keach, David Carradine and Keith Carradine, and Dennis Quaid and Randy Quaid.
- Blood Red, 1989, starring Eric Roberts, Giancarlo Giannini, Dennis Hopper and Julia Roberts in its movie debut
- Back to the Future Part III, 1990, starring Michael J. Fox, Christopher Lloyd and Mary Steenburgen. In what is probably its most famous movie appearance, the engine appears in the scenes set in 1885, six years prior to the engine's actual construction, portraying Central Pacific Railroad No. 131. While the Central Pacific did have 4-6-0's similar to No. 3 at the time the film was set, the real No. 131 was a 4-4-0 and carried the name Greyhound.
- Unforgiven, 1992, directed by Clint Eastwood, starring Eastwood and Gene Hackman and winner of the Academy Award for Best Picture, Academy Award for Best Director and two other Academy Awards
- Bad Girls, 1994, starring Drew Barrymore, Andie MacDowell, Madeleine Stowe and Mary Stuart Masterson
- Color of a Brisk and Leaping Day, 1996, starring Peter Alexander.

== TV appearances ==
Sierra No. 3 has also appeared in many television shows. According to Railtown 1897, these include the following:

- The Lone Ranger, 1956, starring Clayton Moore and Jay Silverheels.
- Tales of Wells Fargo, 1957, starring Dale Robertson and William Demarest
- Casey Jones, 1958, starring Alan Hale Jr.
- Rawhide, 1959–1966, starring Clint Eastwood and Eric Fleming.
- Overland Trail, 1960, starring William Bendix and Doug McClure.
- Lassie, 1961–1962, starring Jon Provost, June Lockhart and Hugh Reilly.
- Death Valley Days, 1962–1965, starring Ronald Reagan.
- The Raiders, 1963 TV movie, starring Brian Keith and Robert Culp.
- Petticoat Junction, 1963–1970, starring Bea Benaderet, Edgar Buchanan and Linda Kaye Henning. Sierra No. 3 pulled the Hooterville Cannonball passenger train.
- Green Acres, 1965–1971, starring Eddie Albert and Eva Gabor. Sierra No. 3 pulled the Hooterville Cannonball passenger train.
- The Wild Wild West, 1964, starring Robert Conrad and Ross Martin.
- The Big Valley, 1964–1966, starring Barbara Stanwyck.
- The Legend of Jesse James, 1965–1966, starring Christopher Jones and Allen Case.
- Scalplock, 1966 TV movie, starring Dale Robertson and Diana Hyland.
- Iron Horse, 1966–1968, starring Dale Robertson & Gary Owens. #3 portrays Buffalo Pass, Scalplock, & Defiance Railroad #3.
- Cimarron Strip, 1967, starring Stuart Whitman and Jill Townsend.
- Dundee and the Culhane, 1967, starring John Mills.
- The Man from U.N.C.L.E., 1967, starring Robert Vaughn and David McCallum.
- Ballad of the Iron Horse, 1967 documentary by John H. Secondari.
- Gunsmoke, 1971, starring James Arness, Amanda Blake and Milburn Stone.
- ’Alias Smith & Jones, 1971-1973, starring Pete Duel, Ben Murphy and Roger Davis.
- Bonanza, 1972, starring Lorne Greene and Michael Landon.
- The Great Man's Whiskers, 1972 TV movie, starring Dean Jones, Ann Sothern and Dennis Weaver, telling the story of why Abraham Lincoln grew his beard.
- Inventing of America, 1975 documentary by James Burke and Raymond Burr.
- Little House on the Prairie, 1975–1983, starring Michael Landon, Karen Grassle and Melissa Gilbert.
- Law of the Land, 1976 TV movie starring James Davis and Don Johnson.
- A Woman Called Moses, a 1978 biopic miniseries about Harriet Tubman, starring Cicely Tyson.
- Lacy and the Mississippi Queen, 1978 TV movie, starring Kathleen Lloyd and Debra Feuer.
- Kate Bliss and the Ticker Tape Kid, 1978 TV movie, starring Suzanne Pleshette.
- The Night Rider, 1979 TV movie, starring David Selby, Pernell Roberts and Kim Cattrall.
- The Last Ride of the Dalton Gang, 1979 TV movie, starring Randy Quaid, Cliff Potts and Larry Wilcox
- Belle Starr, 1980 TV movie, starring Elizabeth Montgomery and Cliff Potts.
- East of Eden, 1981 TV miniseries based on John Steinbeck's novel, starring Bruce Boxleitner, Lloyd Bridges, Warren Oates and Anne Baxter.
- Father Murphy, 1981, starring Merlin Olsen, Katherine Cannon and Moses Gunn.
- The Shadow Riders, 1982, starring Tom Selleck, Sam Elliot and Katherine Ross
- The A-Team, 1984, starring George Peppard and Mr. T.
- Bonanza: The Next Generation, 1988 TV movie, starring Michael Landon, Jr. and John Ireland.
- The Adventures of Brisco County, Jr., 1993, starring Bruce Campbell.
- Ultimate Restorations Season 1, Episode 3, 10/20/2014.

== See also ==
- Sierra Railway 28, a 2-8-0 consolidation also owned by Railtown 1897
- Dayton, also a vintage "Movie Star" 4-4-0
- Inyo, another vintage 4-4-0 which has been featured on screen, including The Great Locomotive Chase and the television series Wild Wild West
- William Mason, an 1856 B&O Railroad 4-4-0 which has starred in many films including The Great Locomotive Chase and Wild Wild West
