= Sierra Railroad =

Freight transportation company in Northern California

Sierra Railroad Corporation
- Type: Incentive
- Industry: common carrier
- Founded: 1897; 129 years ago United States
- Headquarters: United States

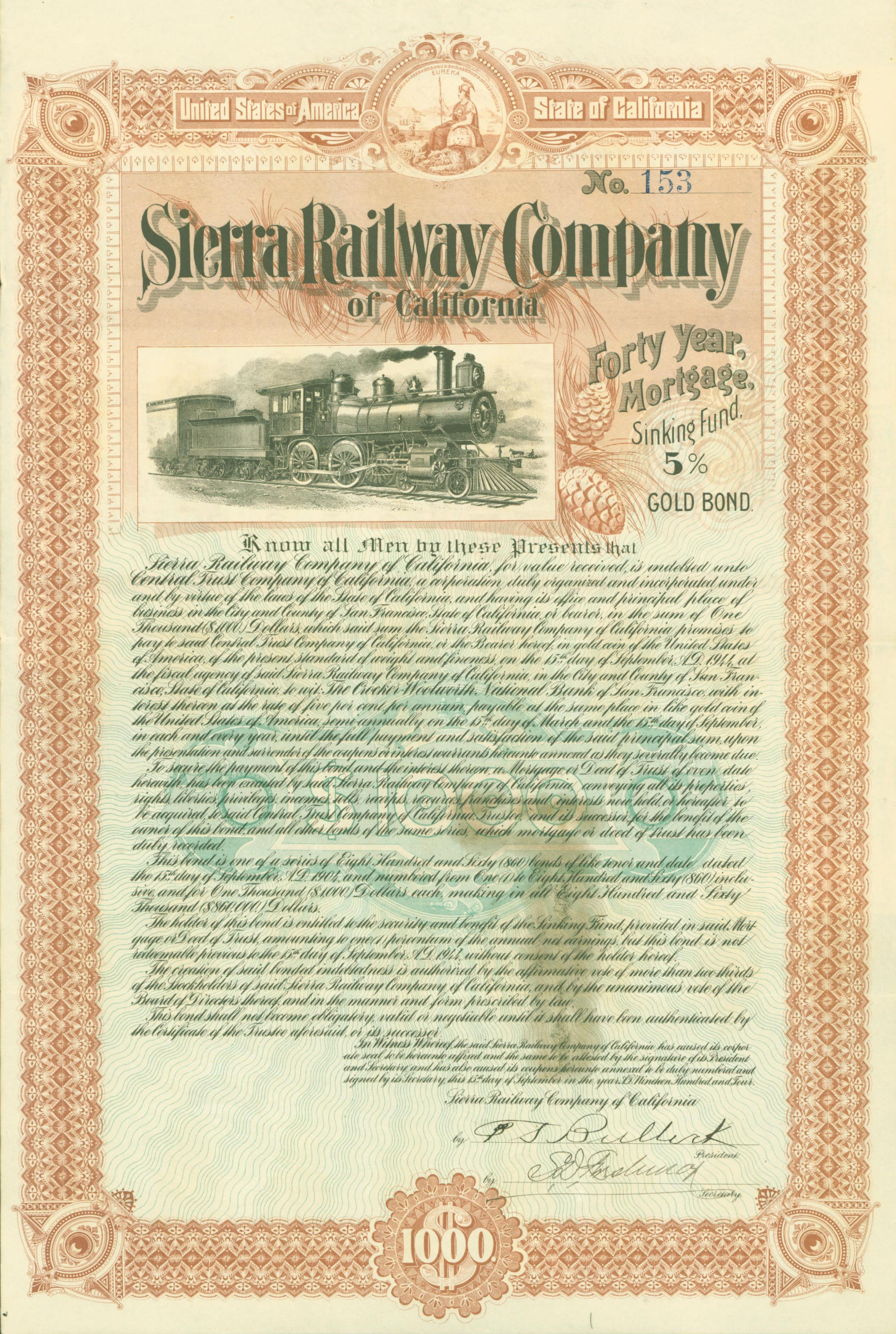
Gold Bond of the Sierra Railway Company of California, issued 15 September 1904

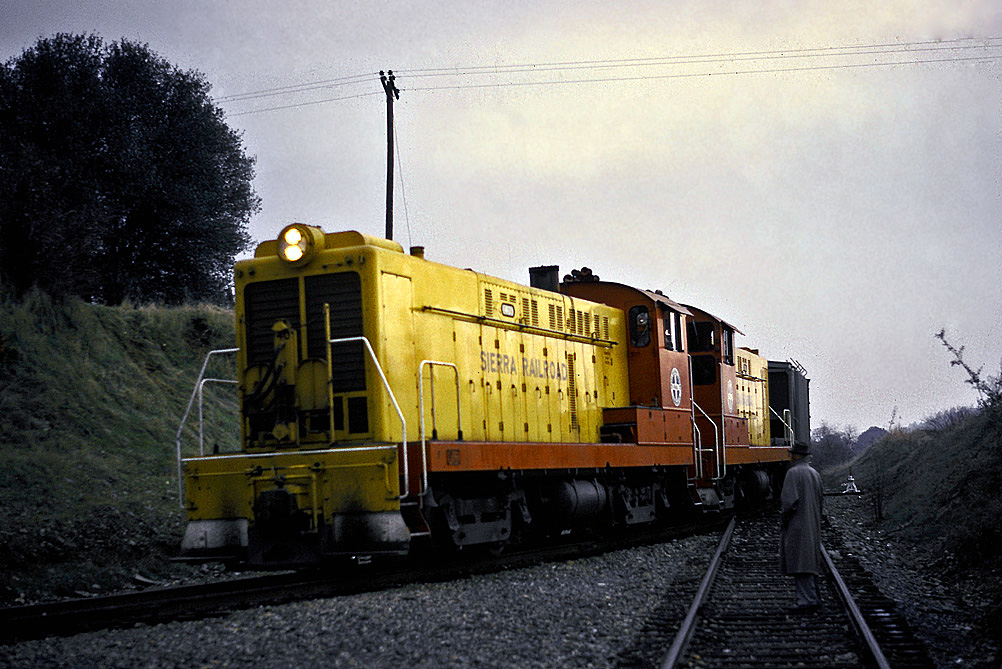
Two Sierra diesel locomotives.

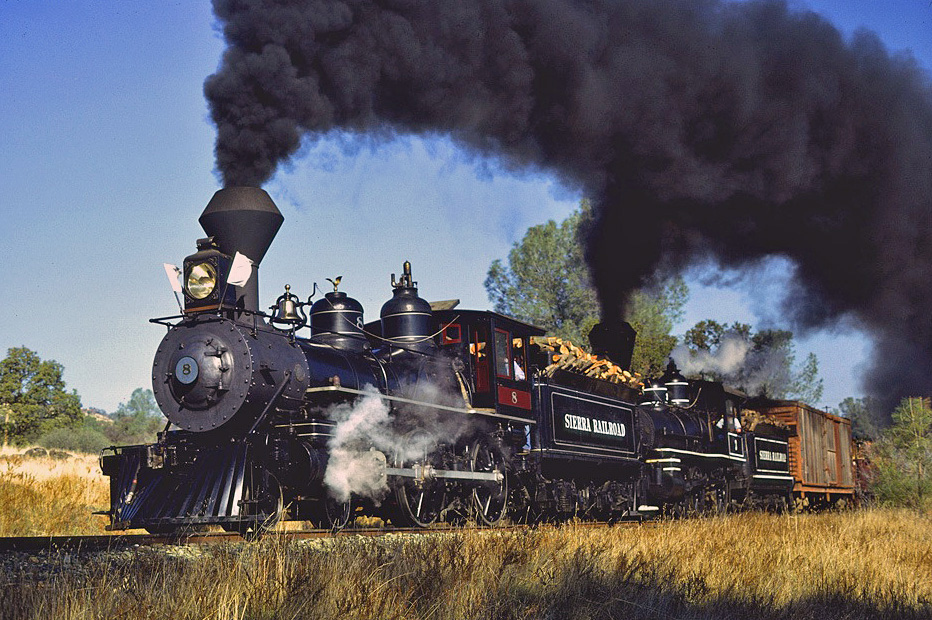
SRR #3 and #8, November 1979

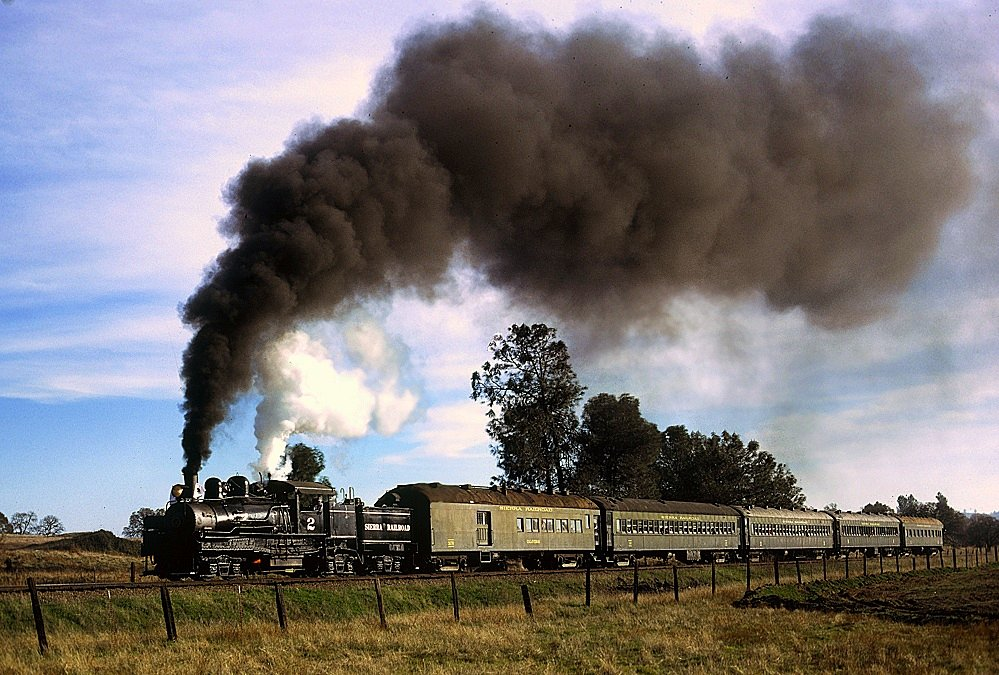
SRR Shay #2 with an excursion train at Montezuma, California, 1979.

The Sierra Railroad Corporation is a privately owned common carrier. Its Sierra Northern Railway freight division handles all freight operations for all branches owned by the Sierra Railroad. The company's Mendocino Railway group operates the diesel- and steam-powered Sacramento RiverTrain (Woodland-Sacramento) and the Skunk Train (Fort Bragg-local), as well as The Sunburst railbikes (Santa Paula). The company's Sierra Energy division is for energy projects.

== History ==
The similarly named Sierra Railway Company of California was founded in 1897 to connect the California Central Valley to the Gold Country foothills of the Sierra Nevada. Its historic western terminus has always been in Oakdale where a junction was once formed with both the Atchison, Topeka & Santa Fe Railway and the Southern Pacific. The Santa Fe's (now BNSF Railway) Oakdale Branch provided one freight outlet to the AT&SF Atchison, Topeka and Santa Fe Railway Valley Division at Riverbank, California; the Southern Pacific Oakdale Branch from Stockton was abandoned in 1986 and torn out by 1990. The Sierra Railroad bought the BNSF mainline from Riverbank MP1 to Oakdale in 2008. The portion of the former Sierra Railway conveyed by the railroad's historic owners, the Crocker Family, to the California State Park System are with "Sierra Railway", which preserves the original operating name of the entire line and is headquartered at Railtown 1897 State Historic Park in Jamestown, California.

In May 2026, private equity firm Ridgewood Infrastructure acquired a controlling interest in Sierra Railroad. As part of the transaction, Sierra also acquired Central Valley Ag Transport, expanding its agricultural transloading capabilities. The acquisition included Railpower, Inc., developer of the United States' only Federal Railroad Administration-approved hydrogen train.

== Beginnings ==
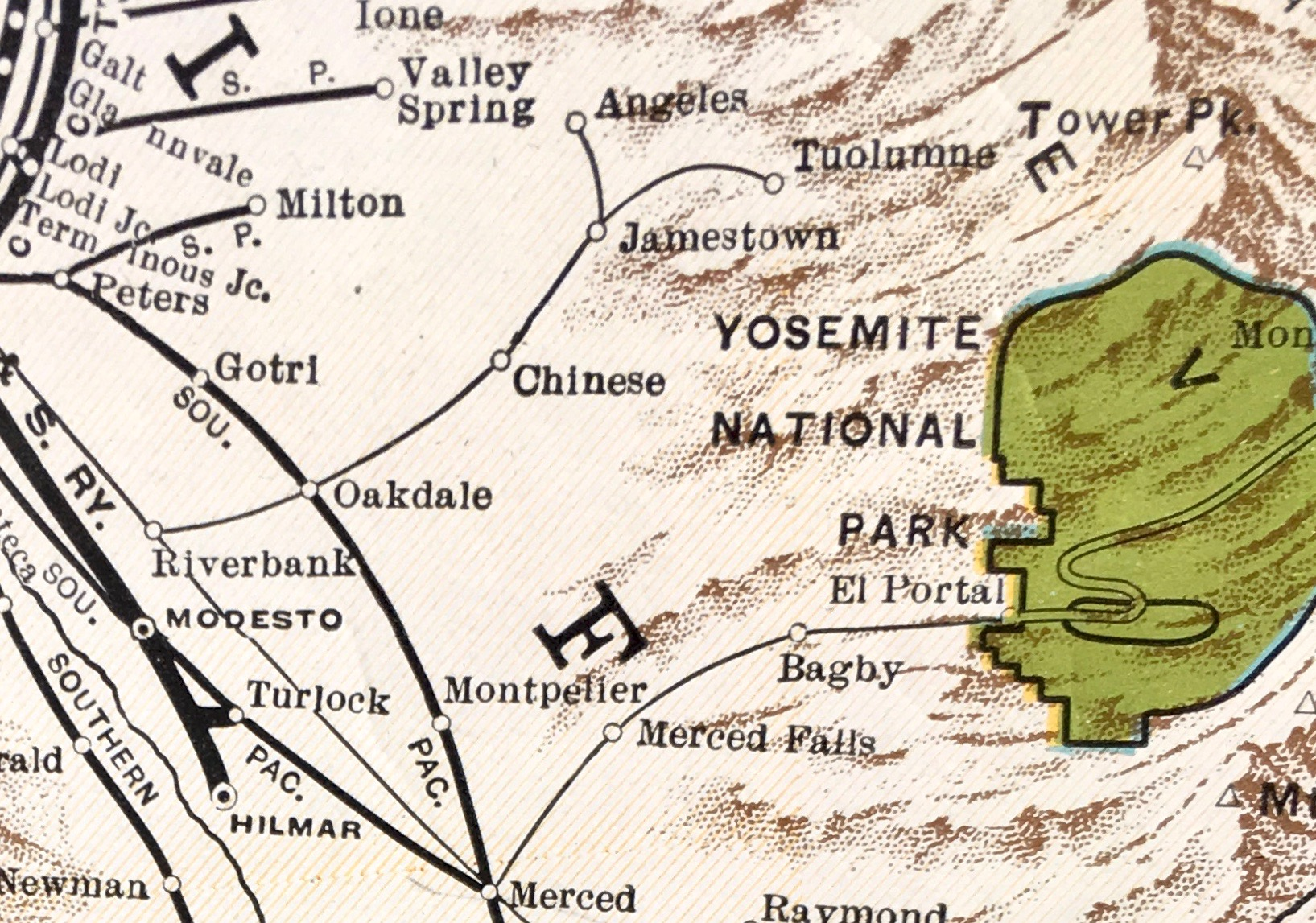
Sierra Railway route in 1931

The Sierra Railway Company of California was incorporated on February 1, 1897, by founders Thomas S. Bullock, Prince André Poniatowski, and William H. Crocker. In May, the first rails were laid in the grain fields just east of Oakdale, and the stops grew to include Occidental (Now called Arnold), Paulsell, Warnerville, Cooperstown, Chinese, and finally on November 8, 1897; Jamestown, California. The railroad owners had no intention of ending the line there, and the line was extended to Tuolumne, some 16 miles (26 km) from Jamestown. By 1900, the line had been completed, the same as it is today, with the exception of the abandonment of the Standard to Tuolumne Right-Of-Way. In 1937, the Sierra Railway was sold at a public auction to the new Sierra Railroad Company, and the debts of the original company were settled. In 1955, the railroad made the switch from steam to diesel power, but retained the steam locomotives for movie and television work for which the railroad is famous. In 1971, the Sierra Railroad used its vintage steam locomotives and facilities to its advantage, and opened "Rail Town 1897" as a tourist attraction. In 1979, The Crocker Association, which was the sole owner of the railroad at that time, closed Rail Town and put both the Sierra Railroad and the Jamestown complex with equipment up for sale separately. In 1980, the Sierra Railroad was sold to Silverfoot Inc., and in 1982 the California Department of Parks and Recreation purchased the Jamestown facilities and reopened the site as Railtown 1897 State Historic Park. In 1995, Silverfoot resold the operation to the Sierra Pacific Coast Railway, and in 2003 merged with the Yolo Shortline Railway, as it exists today.

== Locomotive roster ==
Number	Builder	Type	Date built	Heritage	Disposition	Notes
A	Plymouth	DLC6	1925	HC Collins		
1	Unknown	2-6-0	Unknown	Prescott & Arizona Central #1	Sold/Transferred to West Side Lumber Company as Mill Switcher	
2 (1st)	Unknown	4-4-0	Unknown	Prescott & Arizona Central #2	Scrapped circa 1899	Only used during construction of the railroad
2 (2nd)	New York	0-6-0	1889	Northern Pacific	Sold to Lassen Lumber & Box, scrapped in 1940	
3	Rogers	4-6-0	1891	Prescott & Arizona Central #3	Donated to Railtown 1897 State Historic Park, Operational	Known as the "Movie Star Locomotive" for its roles in many films and television shows
4	Baldwin	4-4-0	1882	Northern Pacific #99	Sold to West Side Lumber Company as Tuolumne Mill switcher in 1917, scrapped in 1938	
5	Schenectady	0-6-0	1899	New	Sold to Hawaii Consolidated (converted to a 2–6–2), scrapped in 1947	Sierra's first new locomotive.
6	Baldwin	4-4-0	1883	Northern Pacific #144	Sold to Atlas-Olympia, later converted to a stationary boiler and scrapped in 1937	Primarily assigned to passenger service.
7	Baldwin	4-4-0	1882	Northern Pacific #93	Sold	disposition unknown, presumed scrapped.
9	Heisler	Heisler 2-Truck	1899	New	Sold to Standard Lumber Company as #8, resold to West Side Lumber Co., scrapped in 1947	Built for service on the Angels Branch.
10	Lima	Shay 2-Truck	1902	New	Sold to Hofius Stell & Equipment, resold to Walville Lumber Co. then to Diamond Match Co. scrapped in 1942	Built for service on the Angels Branch.
11	Lima	Shay 2-Truck	1903	New	Sold to United Commercial Company, resold to Pickering Lumber Co., resold to Verdi Lumber Co. then to Clover Valley Lumber Co., scrapped in 1952	Built for service on the Angels Branch.
12	Lima	Shay 3-Truck	1903	New	Sold to Pickering Lumber Co., now owned by the Pacific Locomotive Association, stored serviceable	Sierra's only 3-Truck Shay. Built for service on the Angels Branch.
18	Baldwin	2-8-0	1906	New	Sold to private owner, now stored in Merrill, OR	Tender sold to Tidewater Southern in 1952 for use with their #132 and scrapped with loco in 1955.
20	Baldwin	2-8-0	1916	New	Sold to US Army as #6814, resold to Kurth Lumber as #20, scrapped in 1955.	
21	Climax	Climax 2-Truck	1906	New	Sold to Sugar Pine Railway as #1, resold to Grant Rock & Gravel, Stillwater Lumber, Zimmerman, Wells, Brown, Sigardson & Bartholomew Logging and finally Jamestown-Oregon Lumber Co.	Sierra's only Climax. Built for service on the Sugar Pine Railway.
22	Baldwin	2-8-0	1920	New	Sold to California Western as #41, scrapped in 1950	
24	Baldwin	2-8-0	1912	Nevada Copper Belt #3	Scrapped in 1955	
26	Baldwin	2-6-0	1908	Ocean Shore #6	Sold to Davis-Johnson Lumber Co., scrapped in 1939	Sierra's only 2-6-0 locomotive
28	Baldwin	2-8-0	1922	New	Donated to Railtown 1897 State Historic Park, Operational	
30	Baldwin	2-6-2	1922	New	Sold to Howard Terminal Railway as #6 (rebuilt as 2-6-2T), now owned by the Pacific Locomotive Association, undergoing restoration as 2-6-2 configuration as built	Mostly assigned to the Angels Branch.
32	Baldwin	2-6-2	1923	New	Sold to Tidewater Southern, April 1940, renumbered 132; scrapped in 1955	Original tender wrecked 1952, replaced with tender from Sierra #18.
34	Baldwin	2-8-2	1925	New	Sold to Reed Hatch 1962, resold to Fred Kepner circa 1987, stored at Railtown 1897.	Leased to and operated by Railtown between 1971 and 1980.
36	ALCO	2-8-2	1930	New	Sold to Reed Hatch 1962, used on White Mountain Scenic Railroad, now privately owned in Merrill, OR	Sierra's last new steam locomotive.
38	Baldwin	2-6-6-2	1934	Weyerhauser Timber Company #4	Sold to Rayonier Inc., now privately owned in Merrill, OR	Sierra's only articulated locomotive.
40	Baldwin	S-12	1955	New	Scrapped in 2008	Sierra's first Diesel.
42	Baldwin	S-12	1955	New	Stored out of service	Sierra's last completely new locomotive
44	Baldwin	S-12	1951	Sharon Steel #10	Scrapped in 2008	
45	EMD	GP9	1954	Great Northern #667	In service	
46	EMD	GP9E	1957	Southern Pacific #5731	Sold	
47	EMD	GP7	1952	Reading Company #607	In service	
48	EMD	GP20	1961	AT&SF #1162	In service	Currently leased to Napa Valley Wine Train
50	EMD	GP20	1961	AT&SF #1130	In service	
52	R.J. Corman/Railpower	RP20DB	2014	New	In service	Built from ex Yolo Shortline #135.
56	R.J. Corman/Railpower	RP20GE	2007	UPY #2628	In service	
131	EMD	GP9	1957	SP #5759	In service	From Yolo Shortline.
132	EMD	GP9	1957	SSW #823	Stored, out of service	From Yolo Shortline.
133	Homebuilt/Railpower	RP20DB	2012	New	In service	Built from ex T&NO GP9 #436.
134	EMD	GP7u	1952	AT&SF #2704	In service	From Yolo Shortline
136	EMD	GP7u	1952	AT&SF 2833	In service	From Yolo Shortline
1227	Lima	0-6-0	1914	SP	Restoration	From Golden Gate Railroad Museum
2608	R.J. Corman/Railpower	RP20GE	2006	UPY #2608	Out of service, waiting repair	
2609	R.J. Corman/Railpower	RP20GE	2006	UPY #2609	In service	
2612	R.J. Corman/Railpower	RP20GE	2006	UPY #2612	Out of service, waiting repair	
2620	R.J. Corman/Railpower	RP20GE	2007	UPY #2620	Out of service, waiting repair	
2652	R.J. Corman/Railpower	RP20GE	2007	UPY #2652	In service	

== See also ==
- California Western Railroad
- List of heritage railroads in the United States
- Sacramento RiverTrain
- Sierra Railway 3
