= Jamestown, California =

- unincorporated community census-designated place
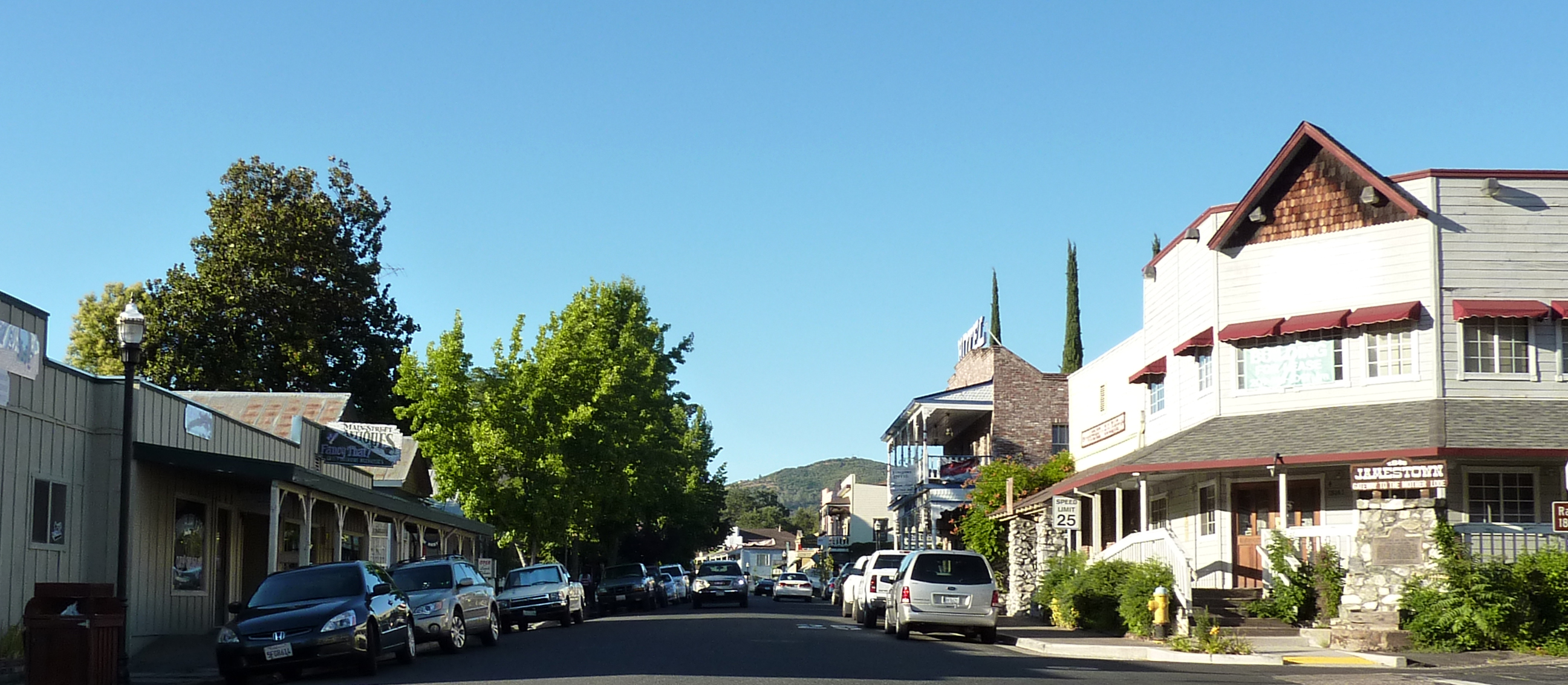
- Main Street

- Location in Tuolumne County and the state of California

- Location in the United States
- Coordinates: 37°57′27″N 120°24′40″W
- Country: United States
- State: California
- County: Tuolumne

Area
  - Total: 3.005 sq mi (7.783 km^{2})
  - Land: 3.003 sq mi (7.778 km^{2})
  - Water: 0.0019 sq mi (0.005 km^{2}) 0.07%
- Elevation: 1,621 ft (494 m)

Population (2020)
  - Total: 3,478
  - Density: 1,158/sq mi (447.2/km^{2})
- Time zone: UTC-8 (Pacific (PST))
  - Summer (DST): UTC-7 (PDT)
- ZIP code: 95327
- Area code: 209
- FIPS code: 06-37106
- GNIS feature ID: 2408437

California Historical Landmark
- Designated: March 16, 1949
- Reference no.: 431

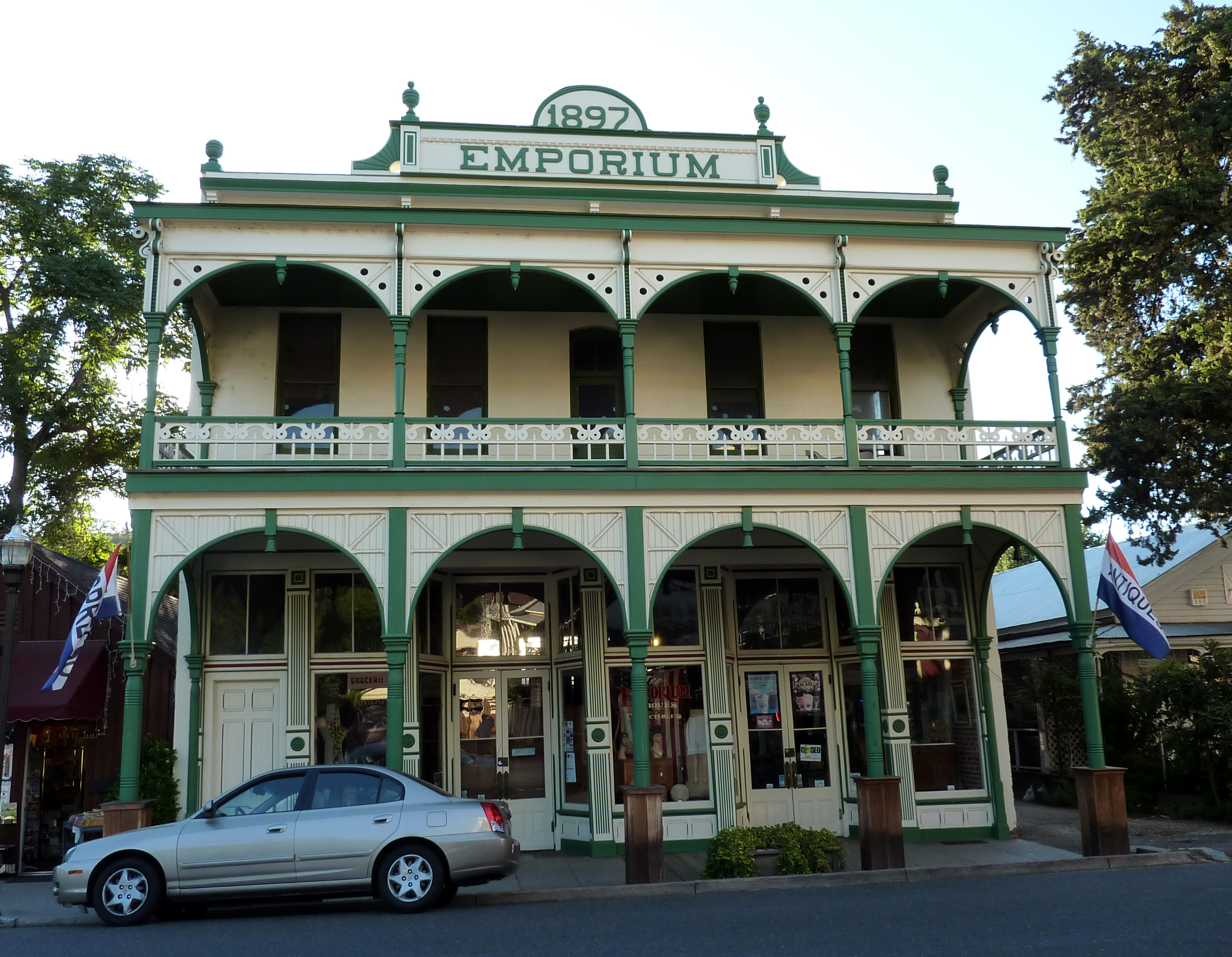
The Emporium is on the National Register of Historic Places.

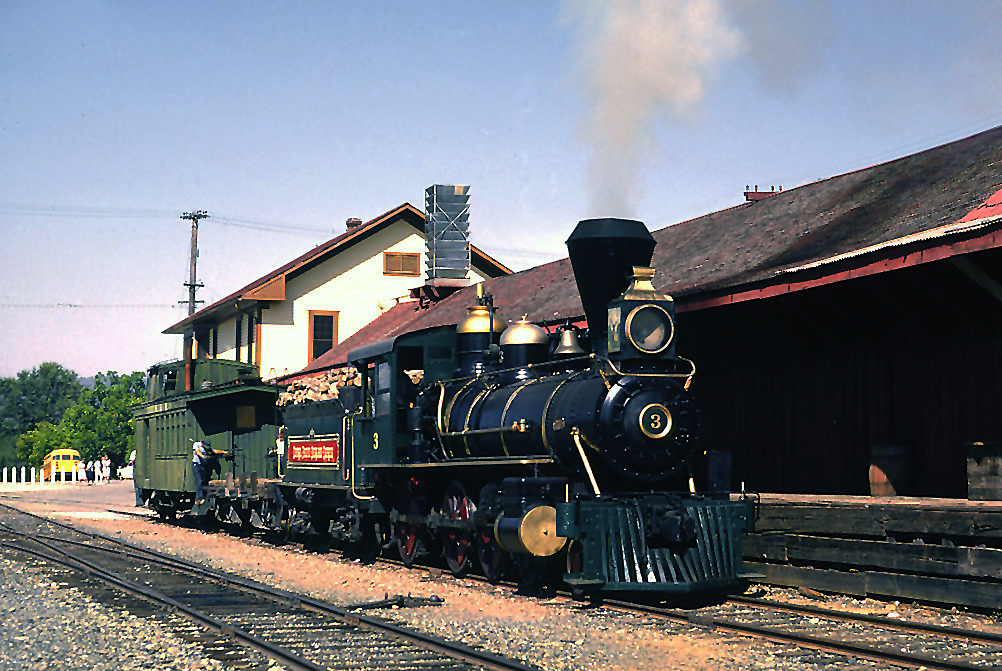
Sierra Railway No. 3 at the old Jamestown Depot, for the filming of the pilot episode of The Big Valley, 1964.

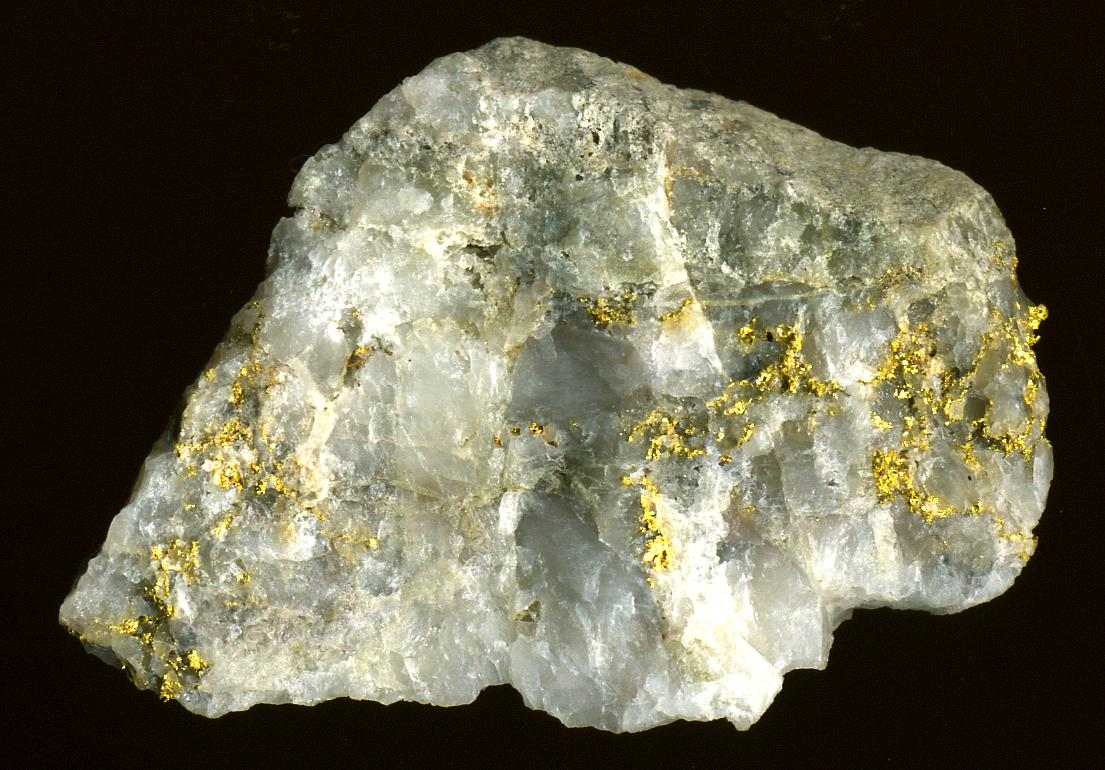
High-grade Gold Ore from the Harvard mine quartz-gold vein. Discovered in 1859, the mine has produced about 800,000 ounces of gold, worth about $1.3 billion at 2014 prices. The mine closed in 1994.

Jamestown is an unincorporated community in Tuolumne County, California, United States. Formerly a California Gold Rush town, Jamestown was designated a California Historical Landmark on March 16, 1949. It is the home of Railtown 1897 State Historic Park and the Sierra Railway, which operates steam passenger trains. For statistical purposes, the United States Census Bureau has defined the community as a census-designated place (CDP). The population was 3,478 at the 2020 census, up from 3,433 at the 2010 census.

== Geography ==
According to the United States Census Bureau, the CDP has a total area of 3.0 square miles (7.8 km^{2}), of which 99.93% is land and 0.07% is water.

== Demographics ==
Historical population
Census	Pop.	Note	%±
1980	2,206		—
1990	2,178		−1.3%
2000	3,017		38.5%
2010	3,433		13.8%
2020	3,478		1.3%
U.S. Decennial Census; 1850–1870 1880-1890; 1900 1910 1920; 1930 1940 1950; 1960 1970 1980; 1990 2000 2010

Jamestown first appeared as a census designated place in the 1980 U.S. census.

=== Racial and ethnic composition ===
Jamestown CDP, California – Racial and ethnic composition Note: the US Census treats Hispanic/Latino as an ethnic category. This table excludes Latinos from the racial categories and assigns them to a separate category. Hispanics/Latinos may be of any race.
Race / Ethnicity (NH = Non-Hispanic)	Pop 2000	Pop 2010	Pop 2020	% 2000	% 2010	% 2020
White alone (NH)	2,575	2,675	2,571	85.35%	77.92%	73.92%
Black or African American alone (NH)	3	19	22	0.10%	0.55%	0.63%
Native American or Alaska Native alone (NH)	52	74	66	1.72%	2.16%	1.90%
Asian alone (NH)	36	26	38	1.19%	0.76%	1.09%
Native Hawaiian or Pacific Islander alone (NH)	8	3	4	0.27%	0.09%	0.12%
Other race alone (NH)	5	8	25	0.17%	0.23%	0.72%
Mixed race or Multiracial (NH)	52	117	235	1.72%	3.41%	6.76%
Hispanic or Latino (any race)	286	511	517	9.48%	14.88%	14.86%
Total	3,017	3,433	3,478	100.00%	100.00%	100.00%

=== 2020 census ===
As of the 2020 census, Jamestown had a population of 3,478, with a population density of 1,158.2 inhabitants per square mile (447.2/km^{2}).

The census reported that 98.2% of the population lived in households, 63 people (1.8%) lived in non-institutionalized group quarters, and no one was institutionalized. Of Jamestown residents, 92.4% lived in urban areas and 7.6% lived in rural areas.

There were 1,546 households, of which 23.0% had children under the age of 18 living in them. Of all households, 35.8% were married-couple households, 9.4% were cohabiting couple households, 35.6% had a female householder with no spouse or partner present, and 19.2% had a male householder with no spouse or partner present. About 37.2% of all households were made up of individuals, and 23.0% had someone living alone who was 65 years of age or older. The average household size was 2.21. There were 828 families (53.6% of all households).

The age distribution was 19.6% under the age of 18, 5.3% aged 18 to 24, 20.6% aged 25 to 44, 25.4% aged 45 to 64, and 29.1% who were 65 years of age or older. The median age was 50.4 years. For every 100 females, there were 91.5 males, and for every 100 females age 18 and over there were 86.2 males age 18 and over.

There were 1,660 housing units at an average density of 552.8 units per square mile (213.4 units/km^{2}), of which 1,546 (93.1%) were occupied. Of these, 63.7% were owner-occupied and 36.3% were occupied by renters. 6.9% of housing units were vacant. The homeowner vacancy rate was 0.6% and the rental vacancy rate was 2.1%.

Racial composition as of the 2020 census
Race	Number	Percent
White	2,745	78.9%
Black or African American	24	0.7%
American Indian and Alaska Native	88	2.5%
Asian	38	1.1%
Native Hawaiian and Other Pacific Islander	4	0.1%
Some other race	170	4.9%
Two or more races	409	11.8%

=== Income and poverty ===
In 2023, the US Census Bureau estimated that the median household income was $51,886, and the per capita income was $38,507. About 2.4% of families and 8.6% of the population were below the poverty line.

=== 2010 census ===
At the 2010 census, Jamestown had a population of 3,433. The population density was 1,145.7 inhabitants per square mile (442.4/km^{2}). The racial makeup of Jamestown was 2,948 (85.9%) White, 20 (0.6%) African American, 96 (2.8%) Native American, 27 (0.8%) Asian, 4 (0.1%) Pacific Islander, 135 (3.9%) from other races, and 203 (5.9%) from two or more races. Hispanic or Latino of any race were 511 people (14.9%).

The census reported that 3,423 people (99.7% of the population) lived in households, 10 (0.3%) lived in non-institutionalized group quarters, and no one was institutionalized.

There were 1,501 households, 399 (26.6%) had children under the age of 18 living in them, 592 (39.4%) were opposite-sex married couples living together, 209 (13.9%) had a female householder with no husband present, 80 (5.3%) had a male householder with no wife present. There were 100 (6.7%) unmarried opposite-sex partnerships, and 4 (0.3%) same-sex married couples or partnerships. 513 households (34.2%) were one person and 299 (19.9%) had someone living alone who was 65 or older. The average household size was 2.28. There were 881 families (58.7% of households); the average family size was 2.89.

The age distribution was 752 people (21.9%) under the age of 18, 289 people (8.4%) aged 18 to 24, 686 people (20.0%) aged 25 to 44, 938 people (27.3%) aged 45 to 64, and 768 people (22.4%) who were 65 or older. The median age was 44.7 years. For every 100 females, there were 90.2 males. For every 100 females age 18 and over, there were 84.1 males.

There were 1,645 housing units at an average density of 549.0 per square mile, of the occupied units 885 (59.0%) were owner-occupied and 616 (41.0%) were rented. The homeowner vacancy rate was 3.4%; the rental vacancy rate was 9.5%. 1,857 people (54.1% of the population) lived in owner-occupied housing units and 1,566 people (45.6%) lived in rental housing units.

== Government ==
In the California State Legislature, Jamestown is in the 4th senatorial district, represented by Republican Marie Alvarado-Gil, and the 8th Assembly district, represented by Republican David Tangipa.

In the United States House of Representatives, Jamestown is in California's 5th congressional district, represented by Republican Tom McClintock.

Jamestown is the headquarters for the Chicken Ranch Rancheria of Me-Wuk Indians of California, a federally recognized tribe of Miwok people.

== In popular culture ==
Scenes from Back to the Future Part III, the final installment of the Back to the Future trilogy, were filmed in Jamestown. A scene from the 2004 movie Hidalgo was also filmed there. Exterior scenes from the TV series Petticoat Junction, The Wild Wild West, and Green Acres were filmed in and near Jamestown, as well as parts of the Little House on the Prairie TV series, and the 1985 Clint Eastwood film Pale Rider.

Jamestown was featured by Huell Howser in Road Trip Episode 153.
