= California State Route 108 =

Highway in California

State Route 108
- SR 108 highlighted in red

Route information
- Maintained by Caltrans
- Length: 120 mi (190 km)
- Restrictions: Segment through Sonora Pass closed in winter

Major junctions
- West end: SR 99 / SR 132 in Modesto
- SR 120 from Oakdale to Yosemite Junction; SR 49 from near Jamestown to Sonora
- East end: US 395 near Bridgeport

Location
- Country: United States
- State: California
- Counties: Stanislaus, Tuolumne, Alpine, Mono

Highway system
- State highways in California; Interstate; US; State; Scenic; History; Pre‑1964; Unconstructed; Deleted; Freeways
← SR 107	→ SR 109

State Route 108 (SR 108) is a state highway in the U.S. state of California that runs from the Central Valley and across the Sierra Nevada via the Sonora Pass. It generally runs northeast from downtown Modesto near the SR 99/SR 132 interchange, to U.S. Route 395 near the Nevada state line. The route was once recommended to continue south of Modesto to Interstate 5, although today that portion exists as a county road. Parts of SR 108 are closed annually during the winter due to inclement weather along the summit.

== Route description ==
Route 108 is defined in section 408 of the California Streets and Highways Code:

Route 108 is from:
(a) Route 5 near Crows Landing to Route 99 near Modesto.
(b) Route 132 in Modesto to Route 120 east of Oakdale.
(c) Route 120 near Yosemite Junction to Route 49 south of Jamestown.
(d) Route 49 south of Jamestown to Route 395 via the vicinity of Sonora and Long Barn.

The definition omits the concurrencies with various other routes instead of duplicating those segments in those other routes' definitions in the code. Furthermore, the highway is not fully constructed to extend further west to near Crows Landing as defined.

State Route 108 begins in downtown Modesto at the junction of SR 99 and SR 132, overlapping SR 132 northeast on L Street from 6th Street to 9th Street. There, it splits into a short one-way pair, with eastbound SR 108 turning southeast with SR 132 on 9th Street to K Street and then northeast to Needham Street; the westbound direction remains on L Street to Needham Street. After several blocks eastward on Needham Street, SR 108 reaches McHenry Avenue, which it follows north out of the city. There are no route markers eastbound indicating where the route turns left from 9th Street to K Street, nor are there route markers indicating where the westbound traffic turns left from Needham Street to L Street.

From Modesto, SR 108 runs north along McHenry Avenue for about 7 miles (11 km) before turning eastward on Patterson Road to follow the Stanislaus River east-northeast. In Riverbank, County Route J7 comes from the north and departs to the south after about a one-mile (1.6 km) co-routing. After following the river about 10 miles (16 km), SR 108 passes straight through the heart of downtown Oakdale.

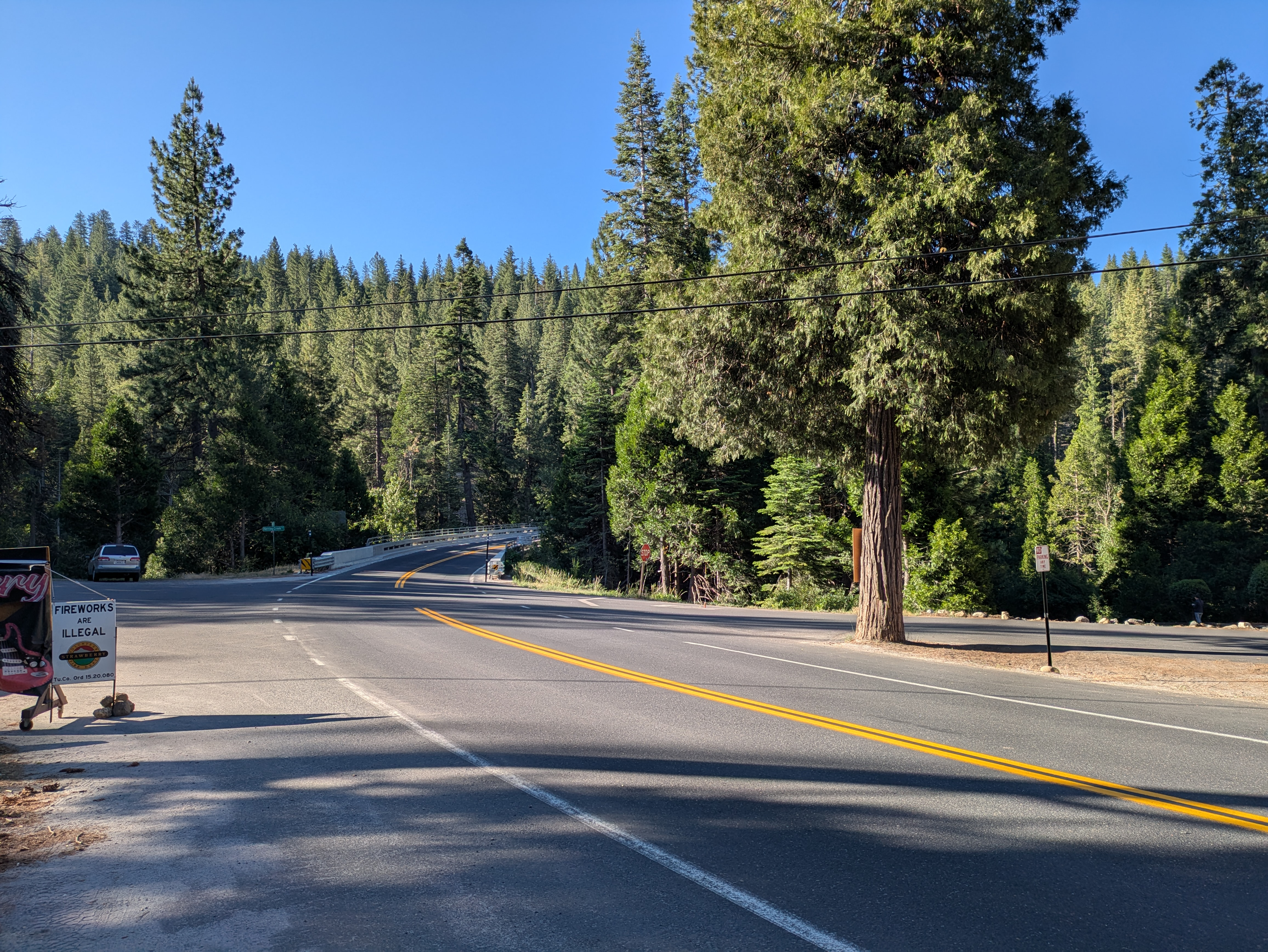
State Route 108 in Strawberry, Tuolumne County

At the main intersection in Oakdale, SR 120 joins SR 108 from the north and they are co-signed as they continue northeast, climbing into the foothills and passing just south of Knights Ferry. SR 120 brings with it the title Northern Yosemite Highway for this segment; with State Route 140 being the middle route from the west and State Route 41 being the southern route to Yosemite. Just past Knights Ferry, SR 108 crosses from Stanislaus County into Tuolumne County, and the road changes from two lanes to four-lane separated highway for about 6 miles (9.7 km). This is advantageous as steep grade is located along this stretch of the road and the extra lanes are useful as passing lanes both ascending and descending the mountain range. About a mile after the end of the separated pavement, La Grange Road (County road J59) heads south, passing just west of Lake Don Pedro and meeting SR 132 near the town of La Grange. Another 3 miles (4.8 km) eastward, at Yosemite Junction, SR 120 finally separates from SR 108 and heads southward toward to a co-routing with State Route 49 through Chinese Camp and across the upper end of Lake Don Pedro.

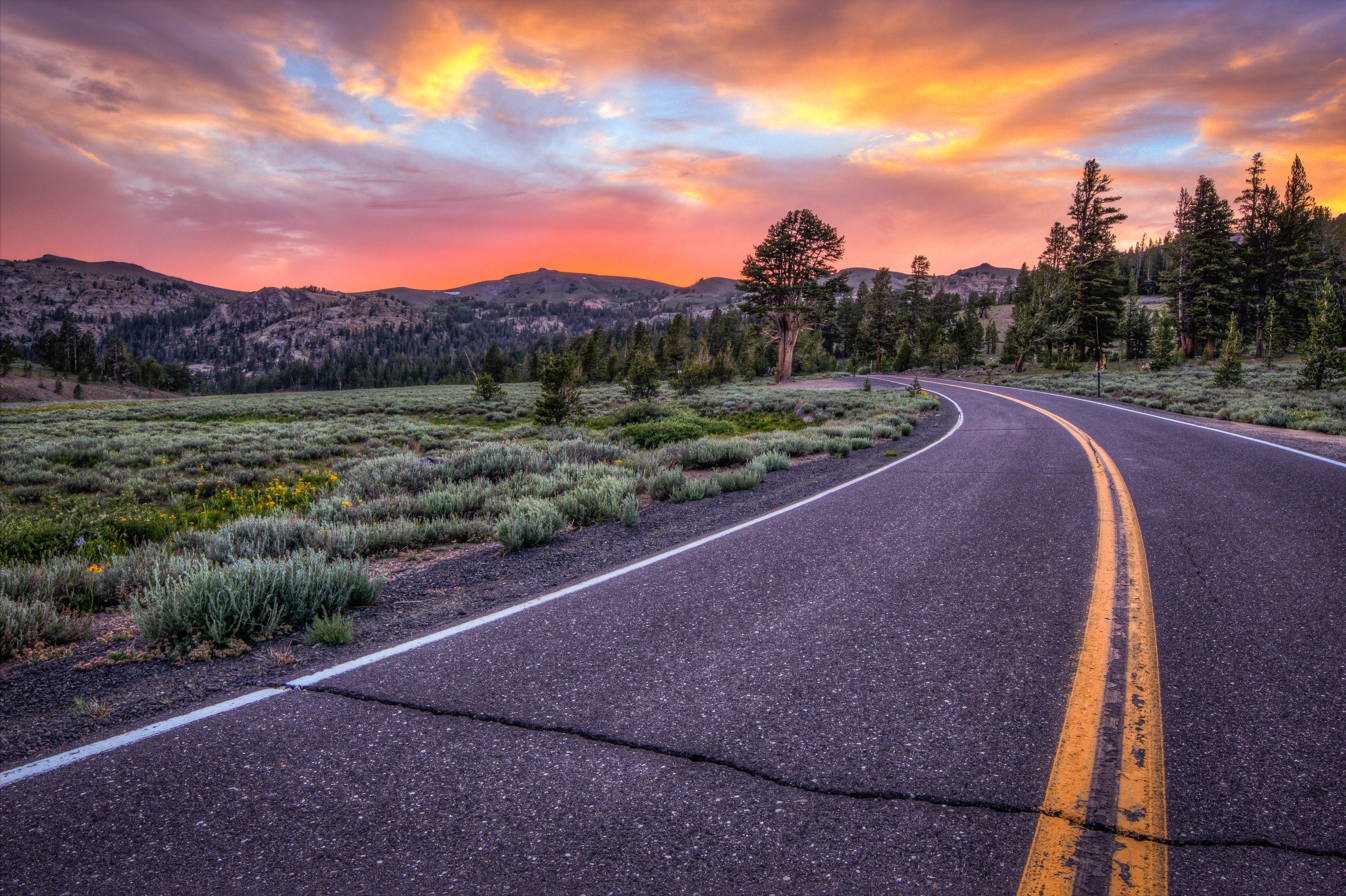
California 108 near Sonora Pass

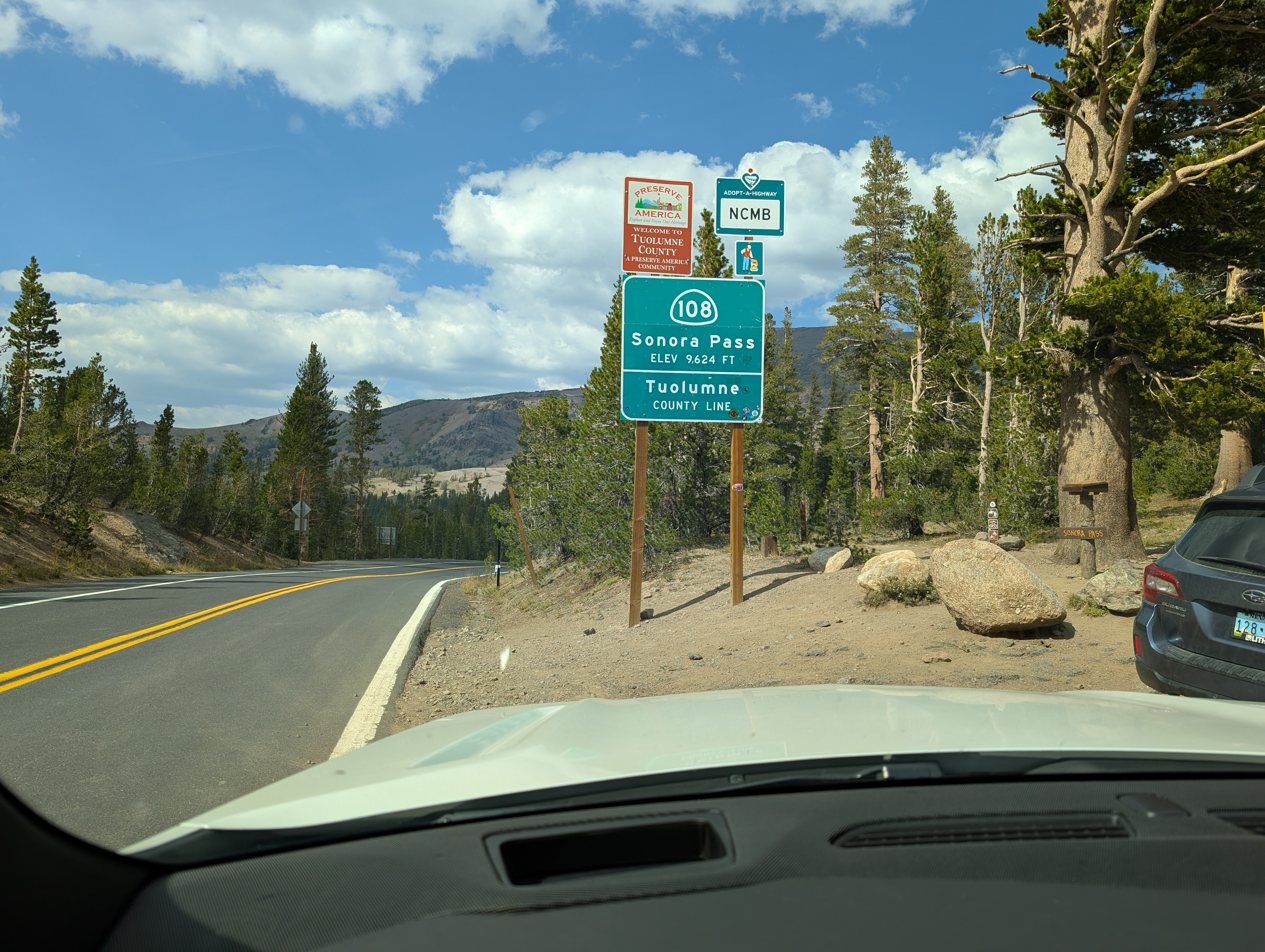
California State Route 108, Sonora Pass Road Sign (Westbound) in September, 2025

Another 3 miles (4.8 km) eastward, SR 49 joins from the south and is co-routed with SR 108 through Jamestown and into Sonora, where SR 49 departs to the north. SR 108 continues eastward and gains elevation as it passes through Twain Harte, Mi-Wuk Village, Long Barn, Cold Springs, Strawberry-Pinecrest Lake and Dodge Ridge Ski Area, then on to Dardanelle and Kennedy Meadow. SR 108 passes through Alpine County for approximately 0.8 miles immediately west of the Sonora Pass. At the pass, the highway crosses the summit of the Sierra Nevada and enters Mono County, then descends past the Mountain Warfare Training Center at Pickel Meadows, finally reaching the eastern terminus at Sonora Junction where it meets U.S. Route 395. Sonora Pass usually closes during the winter months, often from November through as late as May.

SR 108 is part of the California Freeway and Expressway System, and west of the eastern junction with SR 49 is part of the National Highway System, a network of highways that are considered essential to the country's economy, defense, and mobility by the Federal Highway Administration. SR 108 is eligible to be included in the State Scenic Highway System, but it is not officially designated as a scenic highway by the California Department of Transportation.

== Major intersections ==
Except where prefixed with a letter, postmiles were measured on the road as it was in 1964, based on the alignment that existed at the time, and do not necessarily reflect current mileage. Postmile prefixes include: R reflecting a realignment in the route since then, M indicating a second realignment, L referring to an overlap due to a correction or change, and T indicating postmiles classified as temporary. Segments that remain unconstructed or have been relinquished to local control may be omitted. The numbers reset at county lines; the start and end postmiles in each county are given in the county column.

County	Location	Postmile	Destinations	Notes
Stanislaus; STA 14.73 (Note: Indicates that the postmile represents the distance along SR 132 rather than SR 108.)-T18.17 (Note: Indicates that the postmile represents the distance along SR 120 rather than SR 108.)	Modesto	14.73	Maze Boulevard	Continuation beyond SR 99; former SR 132 west
Stanislaus; STA 14.73-T18.17	Modesto	14.73	SR 99 – Stockton, Merced	Interchange; west end of SR 108; SR 99 north exit 226, south exit 226B
Stanislaus; STA 14.73-T18.17	Modesto	14.73	SR 132 west (6th Street) – Vernalis	West end of SR 132 overlap
Stanislaus; STA 14.73-T18.17	Modesto	15.06 R22.44	SR 132 east (9th Street) – Coulterville	East end of SR 132 overlap; serves Modesto City-County Airport; west end of one-way pair where SR 108 east follows 9th Street then K Street, and SR 108 west follows L Street
Stanislaus; STA 14.73-T18.17	Modesto	24.81	Needham Street	East end of one-way pair; Needham Street west connects to SR 132 west / Kansas Avenue
Stanislaus; STA 14.73-T18.17	Modesto	24.81	Briggsmore Avenue	
Stanislaus; STA 14.73-T18.17	Modesto	26.06	Standiford Avenue, Sylvan Avenue	
Stanislaus; STA 14.73-T18.17		27.62	SR 219 west (Kiernan Avenue) to SR 99 / Claribel Road – Salida	Eastern terminus of SR 219
Stanislaus; STA 14.73-T18.17		29.15	CR J6 (McHenry Avenue) – Escalon	Southern terminus of CR J6
Stanislaus; STA 14.73-T18.17	Riverbank	31.05	Oakdale Road	
Stanislaus; STA 14.73-T18.17	Riverbank	32.44	CR J7 north (1st Street)	West end of CR J7 overlap
Stanislaus; STA 14.73-T18.17		33.38	CR J7 south (Claus Road)	East end of CR J7 overlap
Stanislaus; STA 14.73-T18.17	Oakdale	38.24 5.12	SR 120 west / CR J9 / CR J14 (Yosemite Avenue) – Escalon, Manteca	West end of SR 120 overlap
Tuolumne; TUO R0.00-66.97		8.19	CR J59 (La Grange Road) – La Grange, Merced	Northern terminus of CR J59
Tuolumne; TUO R0.00-66.97			CR E15 (O'Byrnes Ferry Road) – Copperopolis	Southern terminus of CR E15
Tuolumne; TUO R0.00-66.97		12.08 L0.00	SR 120 east – Chinese Camp, Groveland, Yosemite	East end of SR 120 overlap
Tuolumne; TUO R0.00-66.97		L2.81 R11.59 (Note: Indicates that the postmile represents the distance along SR 49 rather than SR 108.)	SR 49 south – Chinese Camp, Yosemite	West end of SR 49 overlap
Tuolumne; TUO R0.00-66.97	Jamestown	14.74	CR E5 (Rawhide Road) / Humbug Street	Southern terminus of CR E5
Tuolumne; TUO R0.00-66.97	Sonora	16.48 R0.00	SR 49 north (Stockton Street, SR 108 Bus. east) – Downtown Sonora, Angels Camp	Interchange; east end of SR 49 overlap; former SR 108 east; west end of Sonora bypass
Tuolumne; TUO R0.00-66.97		R2.20	SR 108 Bus. (Mono Way)	Interchange; former SR 108
Tuolumne; TUO R0.00-66.97		R3.42	Hess Avenue	Interchange; eastbound signage
Tuolumne; TUO R0.00-66.97		R3.42	Phoenix Lake Road	Interchange; westbound signage
Tuolumne; TUO R0.00-66.97		R4.50	Peaceful Oak Road, Standard Road	Interchange
Tuolumne; TUO R0.00-66.97		R5.50	SR 108 Bus. west (Mono Way)	Former SR 108 west; east end of Sonora bypass
Tuolumne; TUO R0.00-66.97		7.51	Soulsbyville Road – Mono Vista, Soulsbyville, Willow Springs, Tuolumne City	
Tuolumne; TUO R0.00-66.97		R9.58	Twain Harte Drive (SR 108 Bus. east), Plainview Road – Twain Harte	
Tuolumne; TUO R0.00-66.97	Twain Harte	R11.75	CR E17 (Tuolumne Road) / Twain Harte Drive (SR 108 Bus. west) – Twain Harte	Eastern terminus of CR E17
Tuolumne; TUO R0.00-66.97		17.20	Weigh station (westbound only)	
Tuolumne; TUO R0.00-66.97		38.78	Eastbound winter closure gate	
Tuolumne–Mono county line		66.97 0.00	Sonora Pass (closed in winters), elevation 9,624 feet (2,933 m)	
Mono; MNO 0.00-15.15	Pickel Meadows	9.82	Westbound winter closure gate	
Mono; MNO 0.00-15.15		15.15	US 395 – Walker, Carson City, Bridgeport, Bishop	East end of SR 108
1.000 mi = 1.609 km; 1.000 km = 0.621 mi: Concurrency terminus

== Business loops ==
=== Sonora ===
State Route 108 Business
- Location: Sonora, California

State Route 108 Business (SR 108 Bus.) is a business route of California State Route 108 in Sonora. It provides access to downtown Sonora as Stockton Street, Washington Street, Restano Way, and Mono Way. It follows the former routing of its parent route and is overlapped with State Route 49 on the Stockton Street portion.

Major intersections

The entire route is in Tuolumne County.

Location	mi	km	Destinations	Notes
Sonora	0.0	0.0	SR 49 south / SR 108 – Mariposa, Pinecrest, Oakdale	Western terminus; west end of SR 49 overlap
Sonora	1.6	2.6	SR 49 north (South Washington Street north) – Angels Camp	East end of SR 49 overlap; serves Columbia State Park
Sonora	2.1	3.4	South Washington Street south to SR 49 / SR 108	
Sonora	2.1	3.4	South Stewart Street	
Sonora	2.7	4.3	Sanguinetti Road	Eastbound exit only interchange; at-grade intersection westbound; one-way eastbound
Sonora	2.8	4.5	Greenley Road	
	3.4	5.5	SR 108 – Oakdale, Pinecrest	Interchange
	3.5	5.6	Sanguinetti Road	Interchange; eastbound entrance only
	4.1	6.6	CR E17 (Tuolumne Road) – Tuolumne City	Western terminus of CR E17
	4.8	7.7	Hess Avenue	Connects to SR 108
	5.9	9.5	Peaceful Oak Road, Standard Road – Standard	Connects to SR 108
	7.1	11.4	SR 108 – Sonora, Twain Harte	Eastern terminus
1.000 mi = 1.609 km; 1.000 km = 0.621 mi: Concurrency terminus; Incomplete access

=== Twain Harte ===
State Route 108 Business
- Twain Harte Drive
- Location: Twain Harte, California

State Route 108 Business (SR 108 Bus.) is a business route of California State Route 108 in Twain Harte. It provides access to downtown Twain Harte as Twain Harte Drive.

Major intersections

The entire route is in Tuolumne County.

Location	mi	km	Destinations	Notes
	0.0	0.0	Plainview Road	Continuation beyond SR 108; dead end
Twain Harte	0.0	0.0	SR 108 – Bridgeport, Sonora	Western terminus
Twain Harte	2.6	4.2	SR 108 – Sonora, Bridgeport	Eastern terminus
	2.6	4.2	CR E17 (Tuolumne Road) – Tuolumne City	Continuation beyond SR 108; eastern terminus of CR E17
1.000 mi = 1.609 km; 1.000 km = 0.621 mi
