= South Fork Stanislaus River =

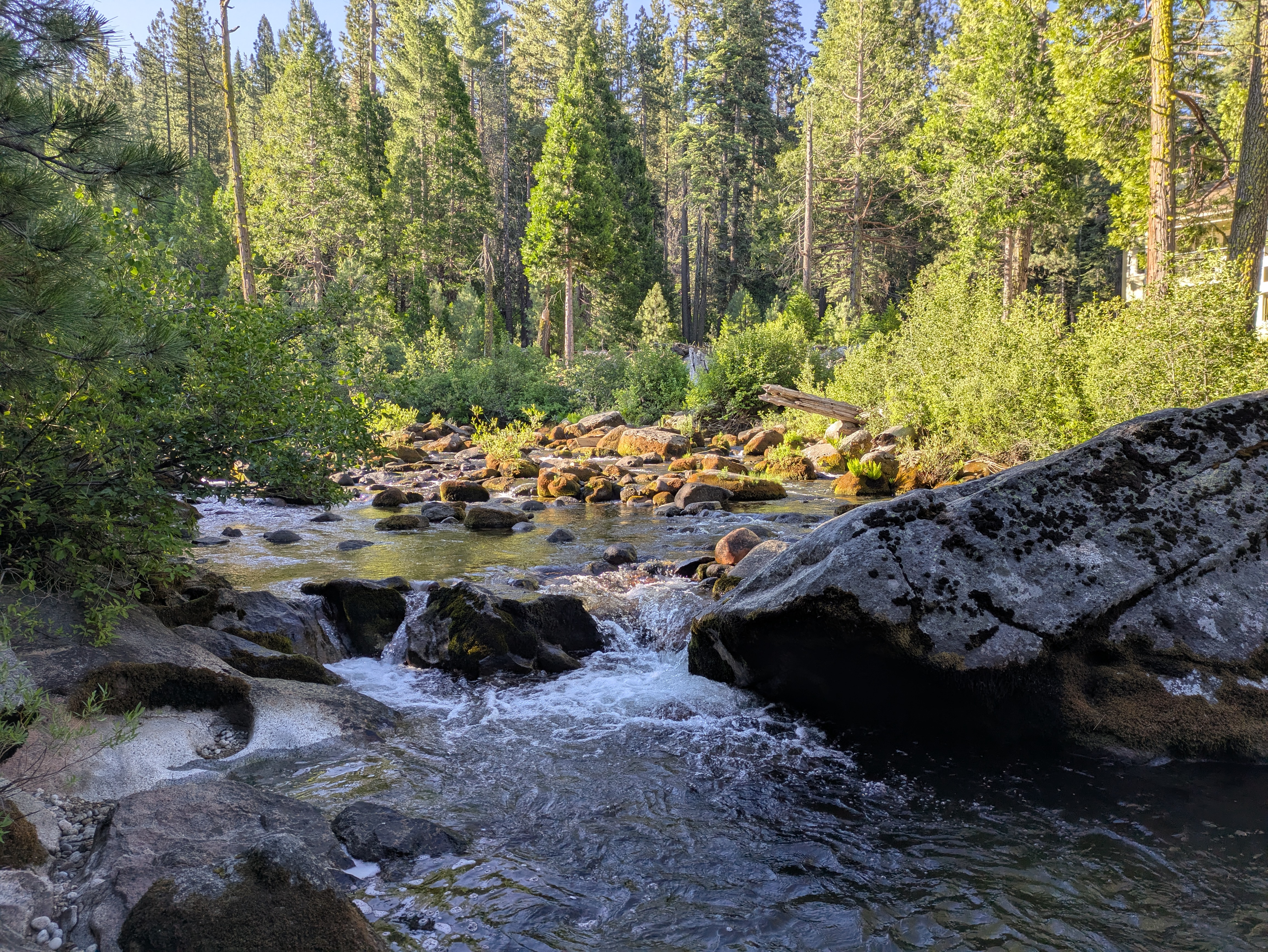
- In Strawberry

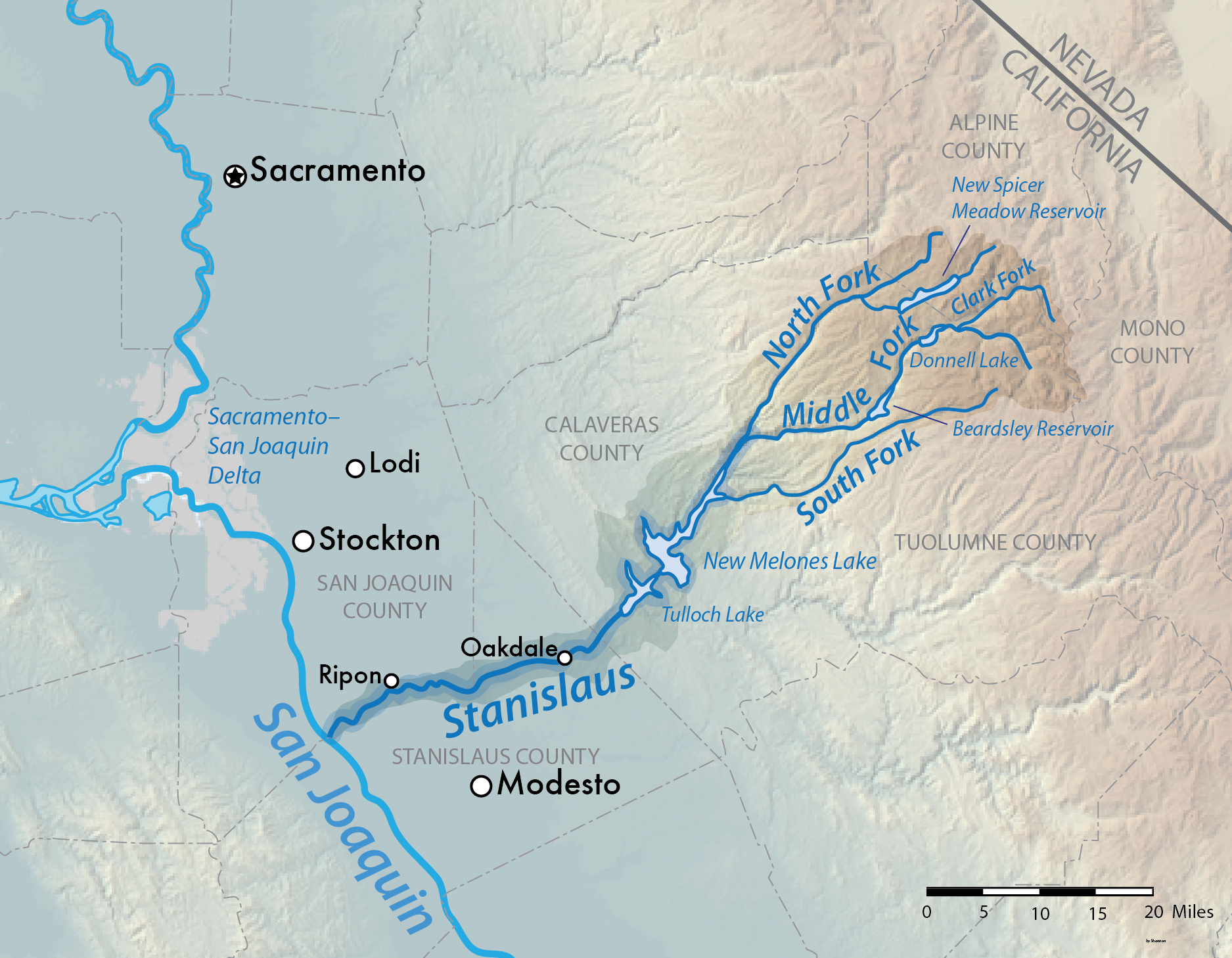
- Map of the Stanislaus River watershed, showing the South Fork

Location
- Country: United States
- State: California

Physical characteristics
- Source: Sierra Nevada
  - location: Stanislaus National Forest
  - coordinates: 38°13′29″N 119°49′05″W
  - elevation: 8,642 ft (2,634 m)
- Mouth: Stanislaus River
  - location: New Melones Lake
  - coordinates: 38°04′26″N 120°25′24″W
  - elevation: 1,050 ft (320 m)
- Length: 48.5 mi (78.1 km)
- Discharge
  - location: near Long Barn
  - average: 85.1 cu ft/s (2.41 m^{3}/s)
  - minimum: 0 cu ft/s (0 m^{3}/s)
  - maximum: 12,900 cu ft/s (370 m^{3}/s)

The South Fork Stanislaus River is a major tributary of the Stanislaus River in Tuolumne County, California. The river flows for 48.5 miles (78.1 km) through rugged alpine and foothill areas of the Sierra Nevada.

The river begins in Hay Meadow in the Emigrant Wilderness of the Stanislaus National Forest. It flows generally southwest, past Pinecrest, Cold Springs and Long Barn, then descends west through a canyon to the New Melones Lake reservoir where it meets the Stanislaus River.

There are two dams on the South Fork: Strawberry Dam, which forms Pinecrest Lake, and Lyons Dam, impounding Lyons Reservoir, which provides municipal water supply to the Twain Harte area. Strawberry Dam is part of the Spring-Gap Stanislaus Hydroelectric Project, which uses water from the South Fork and Middle Forks of the Stanislaus River to generate power.

== See also ==
- List of rivers of California
