= Clavey River =

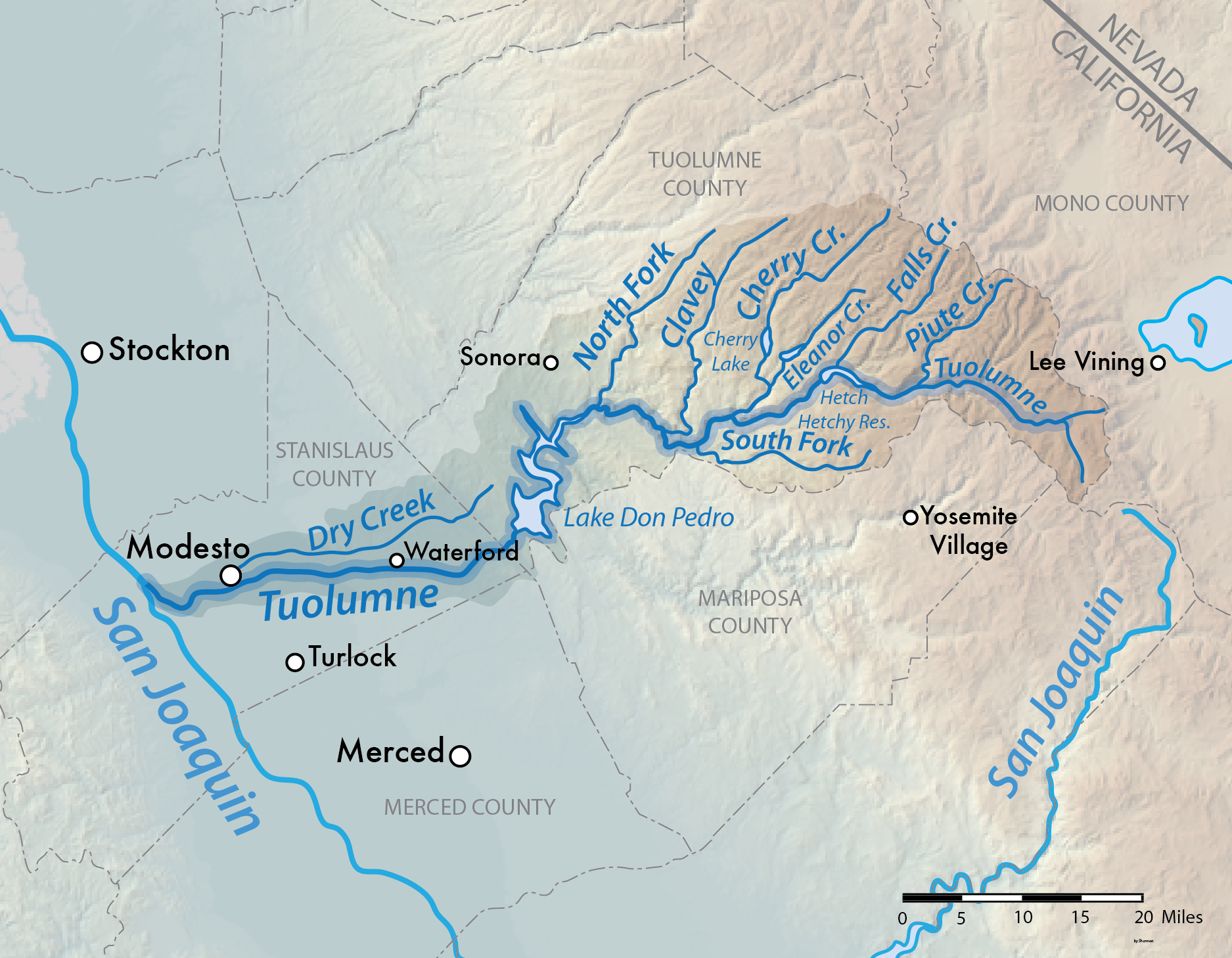
- Map of the Tuolumne River drainage basin, including the Clavey River

Location
- Country: United States
- State: California

Physical characteristics
- Source: Sierra Nevada
  - location: Stanislaus National Forest
  - coordinates: 38°08′28″N 119°58′02″W
  - elevation: 5,989 ft (1,825 m)
- Mouth: Tuolumne River
  - location: Above Lake Don Pedro
  - coordinates: 37°51′50″N 120°06′59″W
  - elevation: 1,178 ft (359 m)
- Length: 31.3 mi (50.4 km)
- Basin size: 157 sq mi (410 km^{2})
- Discharge
  - location: Buck Meadows
  - average: 255 cu ft/s (7.2 m^{3}/s)
  - minimum: 2.28 cu ft/s (0.065 m^{3}/s)
  - maximum: 47,000 cu ft/s (1,300 m^{3}/s)

The Clavey River is a tributary of the Tuolumne River in the Sierra Nevada, located in the Stanislaus National Forest and Tuolumne County, California. The river is 31.3 miles (50.4 km) long, and is one of the few undammed rivers on the western slope of the Sierra. Via the Tuolumne River, the Clavey is part of the San Joaquin River watershed.

== Geography ==
The headwaters of the Clavey are located in the Emigrant Wilderness of the Stanislaus National Forest, at the confluence of Bell Creek and Lily Creek about 3 miles (4.8 km) south of Pinecrest. The river flows mostly north to south, which is rare for streams in the western Sierra, which generally flow from east to west. Shortly downstream, it receives Rock Creek from the left, then Trout Creek from the right, and is crossed by Forest Route 3N01 about 25 mi (40 km) above the mouth. It receives Twomile and Cottonwood Creeks from the right, then Reed Creek, its largest tributary, from the left about 15 mi (24 km) from the mouth. Between Twomile and Cottonwood Creeks there is a concrete bridge carrying Forest Route 1N04.

The Clavey receives Bear Springs Creek and Quilty Creek from the right before reaching a final bridge that carries Forest Route 1N01. Below this point the Clavey flows through a rugged canyon inaccessible except by boat. It makes a sweeping right-hand turn to the west at Jawbone Ridge about 5 mi (8.0 km) from its confluence with the Tuolumne River. The confluence, about 11 miles (18 km) upstream from Lake Don Pedro, is marked by a dramatic rapid on the Tuolumne called Clavey Falls.

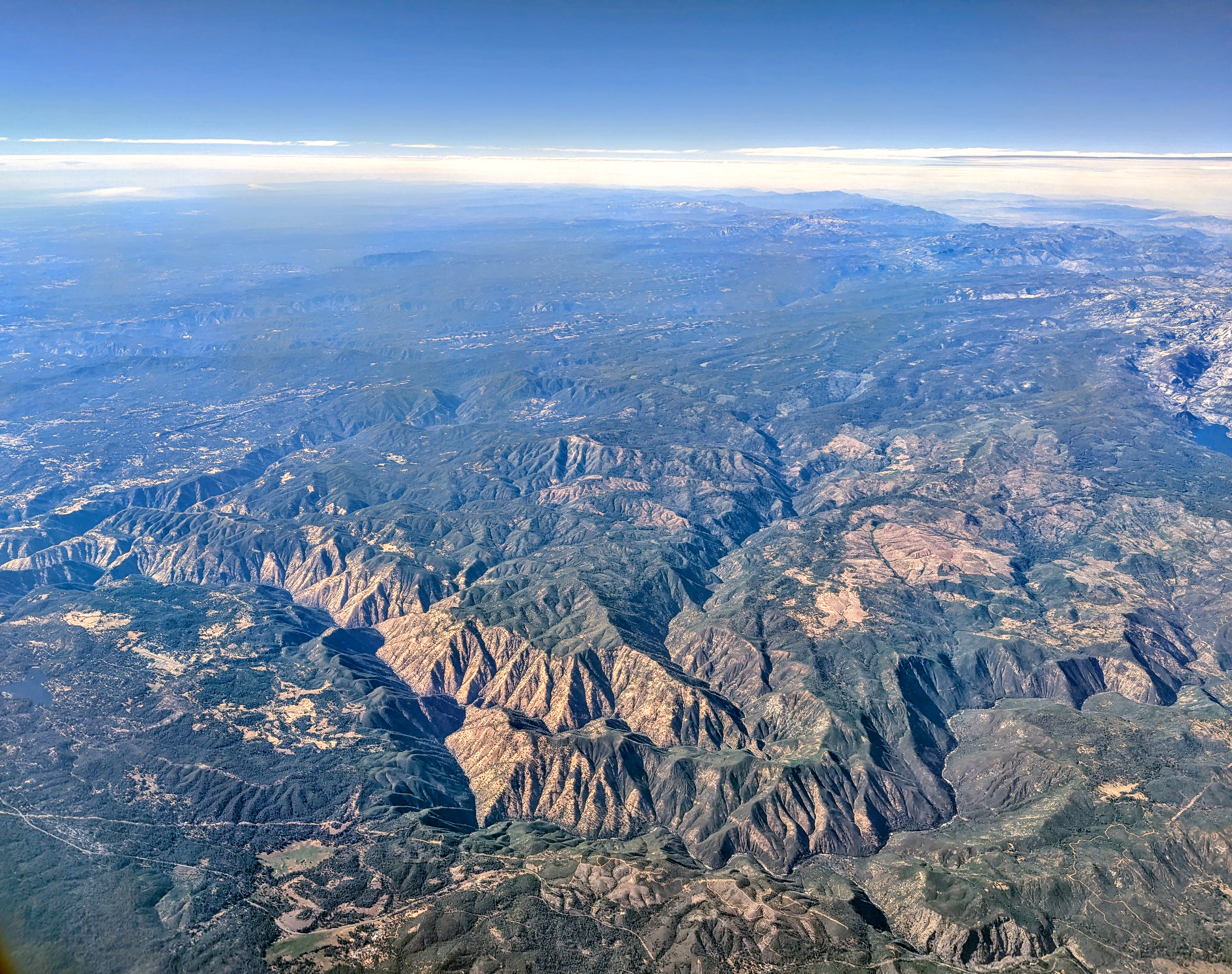
Tuolumne River (lower, all the way across) and Clavey River (next canyon above, with confluence left of center) and South Fork (lower right) aerial view; Buck Meadows is just off the edge (bottom center)

== Features ==
Clavey Falls provides a thrilling landmark to rafters and kayakers heading downstream. The river has notable swimming holes eroded into the granitic Sierra bedrock.

The Clavey is special because it has some of the highest biotic integrity of any river in California, remaining in relatively good flora/fauna/ecological condition. This river is unique because it still harbors a pre-glacial remnant population of coastal rainbow trout.

== Conservation ==
The Clavey River is one of the few undammed rivers in California, despite the many attempts to do so by the Turlock Irrigation District.

A multi-stakeholder group known as the Clavey River Ecosystem Project (CREP) is currently developing a baseline study and recommendations for the preservation of the Clavey.

== See also ==
- Tuolumne River topics
- Tributaries of the San Joaquin River
- List of rivers of California
