= CA68 =

CA68 or CA-68 may refer to:

- USS Baltimore (CA-68), a World War II heavy cruiser
- California State Route 68, a state highway in the US state of California
- Nagoya Station, a railway station in Nagoya, Aichi, Japan (station code CA68)
