= Association of Monterey Bay Area Governments =

Regional governmental organization

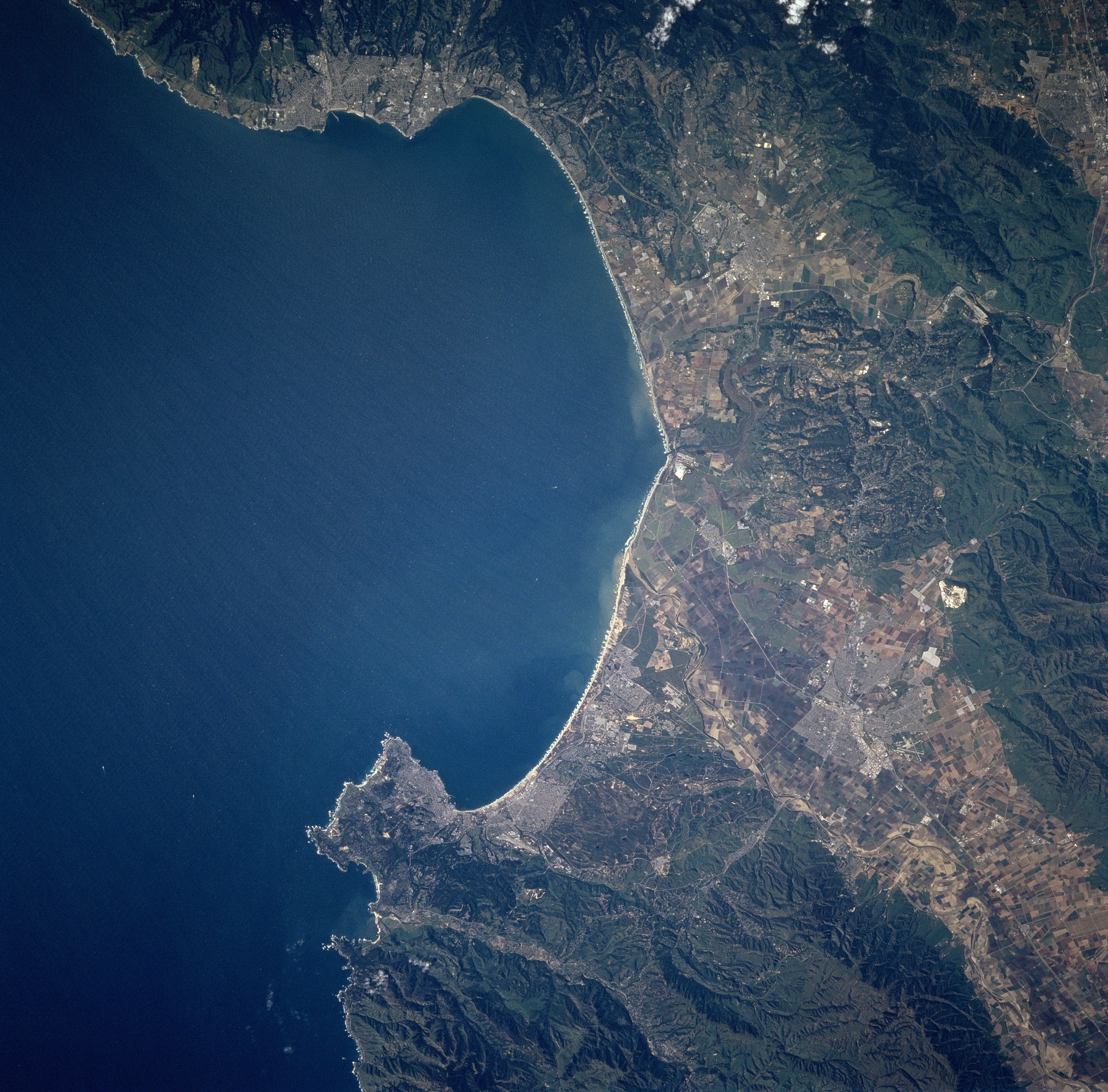
The Monterey Bay area from space, including all the communities in AMBAG.

The Association of Monterey Bay Area Governments (AMBAG) is a regional governmental organization which consists of representation of a large number of public agencies within Monterey County, Santa Cruz County and San Benito County, California. AMBAG has a broad charter of research and governmental oversight for a variety of functions including elements of land planning, natural resource conservation, energy, transportation, and economic development. The following governmental entities are members of AMBAG:

== Structure of the organization ==
AMBAG was first organized in 1968 for the purpose of regional co-operation and problem solving. It was formed as a Joint Power Authority (JPA) governed by a Board of 24 Directors, who are elected officials from each city and county within the Monterey Bay area.

The organization's main function is to perform metropolitan level transportation planning, acting as Metropolitan Planning Organization (MPO) and a Council of Governments (COG).

Membership within the organization is completely voluntary and funding of the organization comes from both state and federal transport grants in addition to its annual membership dues.

== Board of directors ==
The board of directors, in the year 2026, are as follows:

- Susan Westman
- Hans Buder
- John Uy
- Scott Funk
- Robert White
- Rudy Picha
- Oscar Avalos
- Brian McCarthy
- Jean Rasch
- Lori McDonnell
- Margaret D'Arrigo
- Jose Aranda
- Mary Ann Carbone
- Scott Newsome
- Derek Timm
- Alex Miller
- Fernando Ansaldo-Sánchez
- Eduardo Montesino
- Kate Daniels
- Glenn Church
- Angela Curro
- Mindy Sotelo
- Manu Koenig
- Felipe Hernandez

== Counties ==
- Monterey County
- San Benito County
- Santa Cruz County

== Cities ==
=== In Monterey County ===
- Carmel-by the-Sea
- Del Rey Oaks
- Gonzales
- Greenfield
- King City
- Marina
- Monterey
- Pacific Grove
- Salinas
- Sand City
- Seaside
- Soledad

=== In San Benito County ===
- Hollister
- San Juan Bautista

=== In Santa Cruz County ===
- Capitola
- Santa Cruz
- Scotts Valley
- Watsonville
