= California State Route 218 =

Highway in California

State Route 218
- Canyon del Rey Road
- Map of Monterey County in western California with SR 218 highlighted in red

Route information
- Maintained by Caltrans
- Length: 2.850 mi (4.587 km)

Major junctions
- West end: SR 1 in Seaside
- East end: SR 68 in Del Rey Oaks

Location
- Country: United States
- State: California
- Counties: Monterey

Highway system
- State highways in California; Interstate; US; State; Scenic; History; Pre‑1964; Unconstructed; Deleted; Freeways
← SR 217	→ SR 219

State Route 218 (SR 218) is a state highway in the U.S. state of California, connecting State Route 1 with State Route 68 in Monterey County. SR 218 takes an approach north of Monterey Regional Airport via the cities of Seaside and Del Rey Oaks.

== Route description ==
Route 218 is defined in section 518 of the California Streets and Highways Code, and that the highway is "from Route 1 to Route 68 via Canyon del Rey".

State Route 218 begins at State Route 1 in Seaside as a 3 to 4-lane city street for about 3/4 mile. It then exits the city and enters Del Rey Oaks as a 2-lane highway where it shortly meets its east end at California State Route 68.

SR 218 is not part of the National Highway System, a network of highways that are considered essential to the country's economy, defense, and mobility by the Federal Highway Administration.

== Major intersections ==
Except where prefixed with a letter, postmiles were measured on the road as it was in 1964, based on the alignment that existed at the time, and do not necessarily reflect current mileage. Postmile prefixes include: R reflecting a realignment in the route since then, M indicating a second realignment, L referring to an overlap due to a correction or change, and T indicating postmiles classified as temporary. Segments that remain unconstructed or have been relinquished to local control may be omitted. The entire route is in Monterey County.

Location	Postmile	Destinations	Notes
Seaside	R0.00	Sand Dunes Drive	Continuation beyond SR 1
Seaside	R0.00	SR 1 (Cabrillo Highway)	Interchange; west end of SR 218; SR 1 exit 403
Seaside	L0.92	Fremont Boulevard	
Del Rey Oaks	1.96	SR 68 (Monterey-Salinas Highway) – Salinas, Laguna Seca, Monterey	East end of SR 218
Del Rey Oaks	1.96	Monterra Road	Continuation beyond SR 68
1.000 mi = 1.609 km; 1.000 km = 0.621 mi
