= California State Route 219 =

Highway in California

State Route 219
- Kiernan Avenue
- Map of Stanislaus County in central California with SR 219 highlighted in red

Route information
- Maintained by Caltrans
- Length: 4.742 mi (7.632 km)

Major junctions
- West end: SR 99 in Salida
- East end: SR 108 near Modesto

Location
- Country: United States
- State: California
- Counties: Stanislaus

Highway system
- State highways in California; Interstate; US; State; Scenic; History; Pre‑1964; Unconstructed; Deleted; Freeways
← SR 218	→ SR 220

State Route 219 (SR 219) is a state highway in the U.S. state of California that runs north of Modesto in Stanislaus County. It serves as a connector along Kiernan Avenue between State Route 99 and State Route 108.

== Route description ==
Route 219 is defined in section 519 of the California Streets and Highways Code, and that the highway is "from Route 99 at Salida easterly to Route 108".

SR 219 begins at an interchange with SR 99 in Salida. It then heads east, out of the city, as Kiernan Avenue. The east end of SR 219 is at State Route 108 in Stanislaus County, due north of Modesto. Other than Salida, the route runs through rural farmland and does not connect between any population centers.

SR 219 is not part of the National Highway System, a network of highways that are considered essential to the country's economy, defense, and mobility by the Federal Highway Administration.

== History ==
In 2009, 2.25 miles (3.62 km) of SR 219 were expanded to 4 lanes with a center median. As of November 2010, a study was underway to determine the feasibility of reconstructing the State Route 99/State Route 219 interchange to handle projected future demand.

In January 2015 the old Kiernan Avenue overpass for the SR 99 interchange was demolished, to make way for the new SR 99 interchange. Traffic was shifted over to a small portion of the new interchange that had been completed during the demolition, so that traffic would still be able to pass over SR 99.

June 20, 2016, marked the completion of a $42 million, three-year project to build an interchange with SR 99 in Salida. $33.4 million was paid for by the state through a bond measure while the remainder came from fees charged by Stanislaus County to developers. The new interchange provided a wider overpass, more room for entering traffic and a new bike lane.

== Major intersections ==
Except where prefixed with a letter, postmiles were measured on the road as it was in 1964, based on the alignment that existed at the time, and do not necessarily reflect current mileage. Postmile prefixes include: R reflecting a realignment in the route since then, M indicating a second realignment, L referring to an overlap due to a correction or change, and T indicating postmiles classified as temporary. Segments that remain unconstructed or have been relinquished to local control may be omitted. The entire route is in Stanislaus County.

Location	Postmile	Destinations	Notes
Salida	0.12	Broadway	Continuation beyond SR 99
Salida	0.12	SR 99	Interchange; west end of SR 219; SR 99 exit 233
	4.86	SR 108 (McHenry Avenue) – Riverbank, Modesto	East end of SR 219
	4.86	Claribel Road	Continuation beyond SR 108
1.000 mi = 1.609 km; 1.000 km = 0.621 mi
