= Del Rey Oaks, California =

City in California, United States

City of Del Rey Oaks
- City
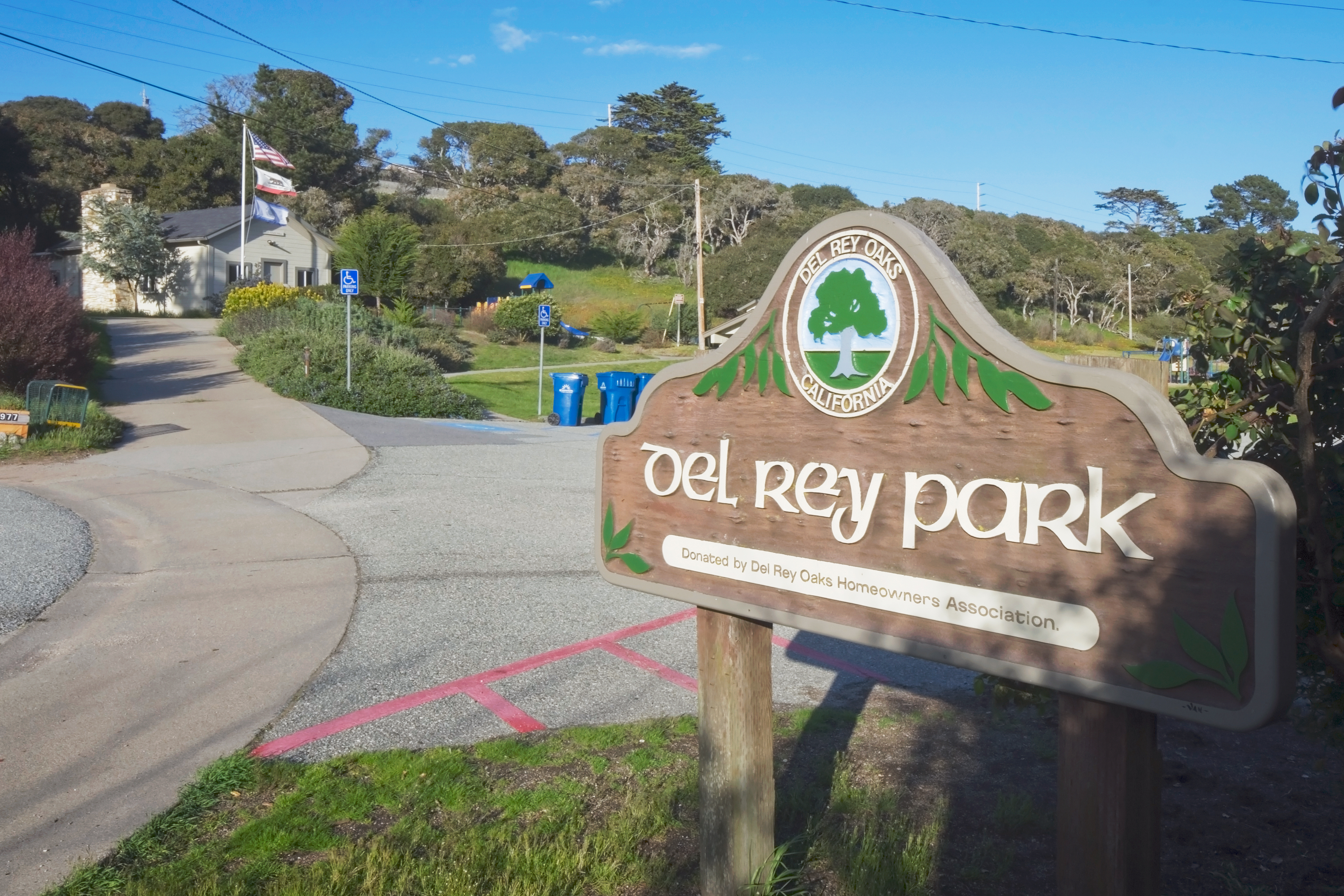
- Del Rey Park with the Old Town Hall

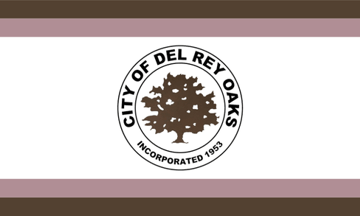
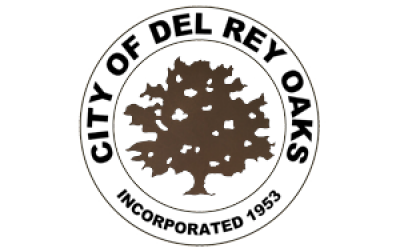
- Flag Seal
- Interactive map of City of Del Rey Oaks
- Location in the United States
- Coordinates: 36°35′36″N 121°50′06″W
- Country: United States
- State: California
- County: Monterey
- Incorporated: September 3, 1953

Government
  - Mayor: Scott Donaldson
  - State Senator: John Laird (D)
  - Assemblymember: Dawn Addis (D)
  - U. S. Rep.: Jimmy Panetta (D)

Area
  - Total: 1.06 sq mi (2.74 km^{2})
  - Land: 1.05 sq mi (2.73 km^{2})
  - Water: 0.0039 sq mi (0.01 km^{2}) 0.42%
- Elevation: 82 ft (25 m)

Population (2020)
  - Total: 1,592
  - Density: 1,509.8/sq mi (582.95/km^{2})
- Time zone: UTC−08:00 (PST)
  - Summer (DST): UTC−07:00 (PDT)
- ZIP Code: 93940
- Area code: 831
- FIPS code: 06-18688
- GNIS feature ID: 1658400
- Website: www.delreyoaks.org

Del Rey Oaks (Del Rey, Spanish for "Of the King") is a city in Monterey County, California, United States. It is located just southeast of Seaside, at an elevation of 82 feet (25 m). The population was 1,592 at the 2020 census. Del Rey Oaks is a member of the Association of Monterey Bay Area Governments, a regional government agency.

== History ==
The town was formerly known as Del Rey Woods.

== Geography ==
Del Rey Oaks is located in northwestern Monterey County at 36°35′36″N 121°50′06″W. It is bordered to the north by the city of Seaside and to the west and south by Monterey. Downtown Monterey is 4 miles (6 km) to the west. California State Route 218 (Canyon Del Rey Boulevard) is the main road through Del Rey Oaks, leading northwest to State Route 1 at Monterey State Beach and southeast to State Route 68 just outside the city limits. Salinas, the Monterey county seat, is 15 miles (24 km) to the northeast of Del Rey Oaks via SR 68.

According to the United States Census Bureau, the city of Del Rey Oaks has a total area of 1.1 square miles (2.8 km^{2}), of which 99.81% is land and 0.19% is water.

=== Climate ===
The region experiences warm (but not hot) and dry summers, with no average monthly temperatures above 71.6 °F. According to the Köppen Climate Classification system, Del Rey Oaks has a warm-summer Mediterranean climate, abbreviated "Csb" on climate maps.

== History ==
Prior to incorporation (on September 3, 1953) the town was called Del Rey Woods. The Del Rey Oaks post office opened in 1968.

== Demographics ==
Historical population
Census	Pop.	Note	%±
1960	1,831		—
1970	1,823		−0.4%
1980	1,557		−14.6%
1990	1,661		6.7%
2000	1,650		−0.7%
2010	1,624		−1.6%
2020	1,592		−2.0%
U.S. Decennial Census

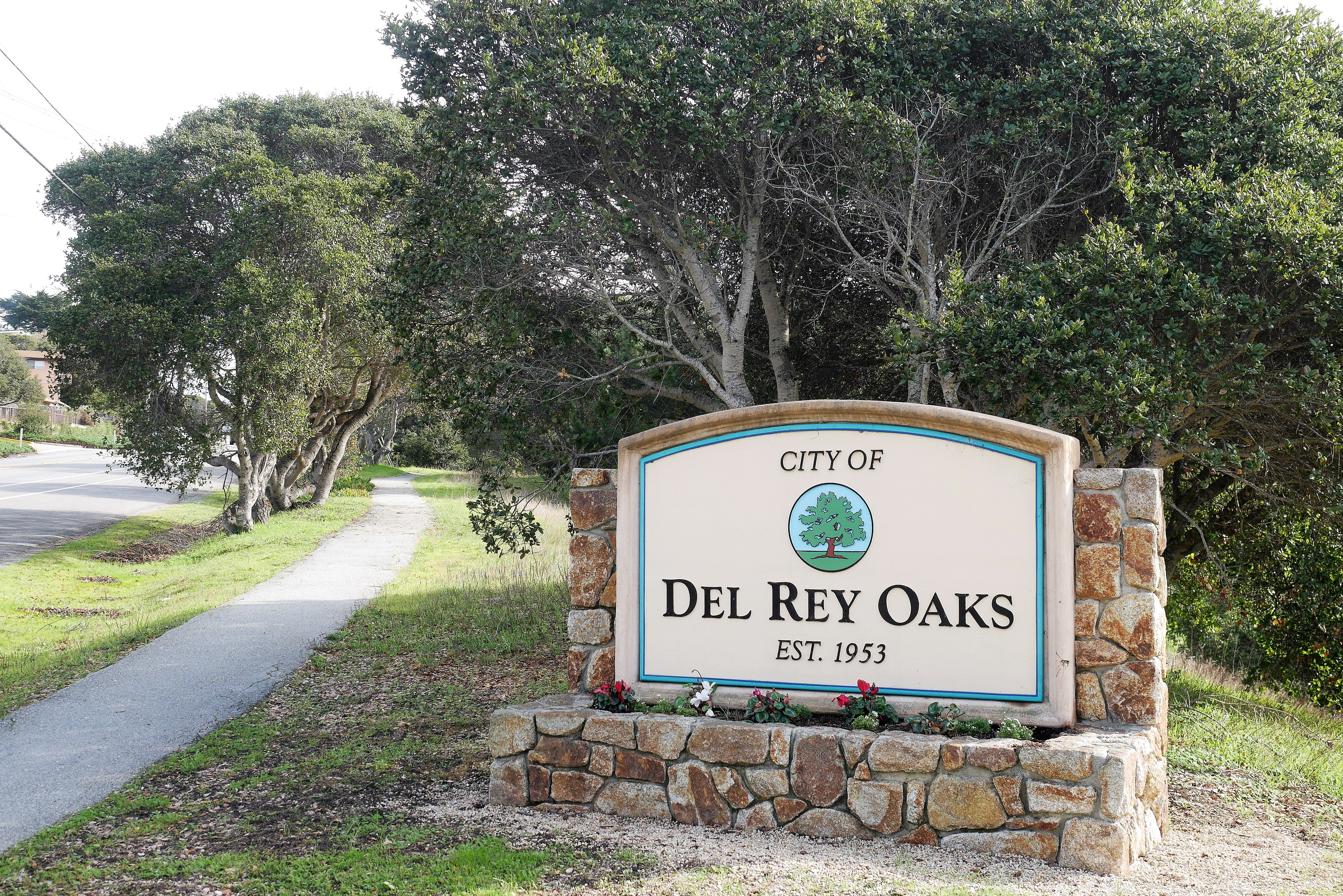
Welcome sign

=== Racial and ethnic composition ===
Del Rey Oaks, California – Racial and ethnic composition Note: the US Census treats Hispanic/Latino as an ethnic category. This table excludes Latinos from the racial categories and assigns them to a separate category. Hispanics/Latinos may be of any race.
Race / Ethnicity (NH = Non-Hispanic)	Pop 2000	Pop 2010	Pop 2020	% 2000	% 2010	% 2020
White alone (NH)	1,367	1,237	1,084	82.85%	76.17%	68.09%
Black or African American alone (NH)	26	13	26	1.58%	0.80%	1.63%
Native American or Alaska Native alone (NH)	10	7	7	0.61%	0.43%	0.44%
Asian alone (NH)	83	126	125	5.03%	7.76%	7.85%
Native Hawaiian or Pacific Islander alone (NH)	0	4	5	0.00%	0.25%	0.31%
Other race alone (NH)	13	3	2	0.79%	0.18%	0.13%
Mixed race or Multiracial (NH)	42	65	99	2.55%	4.00%	6.22%
Hispanic or Latino (any race)	109	169	244	6.61%	10.41%	15.33%
Total	1,650	1,624	1,592	100.00%	100.00%	100.00%

=== 2020 census ===
As of the 2020 census, Del Rey Oaks had a population of 1,592. The population density was 1,510.4 inhabitants per square mile (583.2/km^{2}). The racial makeup of Del Rey Oaks was 1,141 (71.7%) White, 29 (1.8%) African American, 14 (0.9%) Native American, 128 (8.0%) Asian, 6 (0.4%) Pacific Islander, 62 (3.9%) from other races, and 212 (13.3%) from two or more races. Hispanic or Latino of any race were 244 persons (15.3%).

The age distribution was 218 people (13.7%) under the age of 18, 88 people (5.5%) aged 18 to 24, 390 people (24.5%) aged 25 to 44, 479 people (30.1%) aged 45 to 64, and 417 people (26.2%) who were 65 years of age or older. The median age was 49.3 years. For every 100 females, there were 93.2 males, and for every 100 females age 18 and over, there were 87.4 males age 18 and over.

99.2% of residents lived in urban areas, while 0.8% lived in rural areas.

The whole population lived in households. There were 699 households, out of which 170 (24.3%) had children under the age of 18 living in them, 339 (48.5%) were married-couple households, 35 (5.0%) were cohabiting couple households, 210 (30.0%) had a female householder with no partner present, and 115 (16.5%) had a male householder with no partner present. 185 households (26.5%) were one person, and 98 (14.0%) were one person aged 65 or older. The average household size was 2.28. There were 455 families (65.1% of all households).

There were 739 housing units at an average density of 701.1 units per square mile (270.7 units/km^{2}), of which 699 (94.6%) were occupied. Of these, 500 (71.5%) were owner-occupied, and 199 (28.5%) were occupied by renters. Of all housing units, 5.4% were vacant; the homeowner vacancy rate was 0.6%, and the rental vacancy rate was 2.9%.

=== Income and poverty ===
In 2023, the US Census Bureau estimated that the median household income was $130,909, and the per capita income was $62,855. About 6.2% of families and 5.9% of the population were below the poverty line.

== Parks ==
Del Rey Oaks houses the Frog Pond Wetland Preserve, a 17-acre (69,000 m^{2}) wetland area popular with birders.

== Media ==
Television service for the community comes from the Monterey-Salinas-Santa Cruz designated market area (DMA). Radio stations Monterey-Salinas-Santa Cruz area of dominant influence (ADI) or continuous measurement market (CMM). Locale newspapers include the Monterey County Herald.

== See also ==
- Media in Monterey County
- Coastal California
- List of school districts in Monterey County, California
