= California State Route 217 =

Highway in California

State Route 217
- SR 217 highlighted in red

Route information
- Maintained by Caltrans
- Length: 2.525 mi (4.064 km)

Major junctions
- West end: UC Santa Barbara
- East end: US 101 / SR 1 in Goleta

Location
- Country: United States
- State: California
- Counties: Santa Barbara

Highway system
- State highways in California; Interstate; US; State; Scenic; History; Pre‑1964; Unconstructed; Deleted; Freeways
← SR 216	→ SR 218

State Route 217 (SR 217) is a state highway in the U.S. state of California that serves as a spur route from U.S. Route 101 to the University of California, Santa Barbara. Although the entire route is a freeway, SR 217 is officially named Ward Memorial Boulevard in honor of California State Senator Clarence C. Ward, who represented Santa Barbara County from 1941 to 1955.

== Route description ==
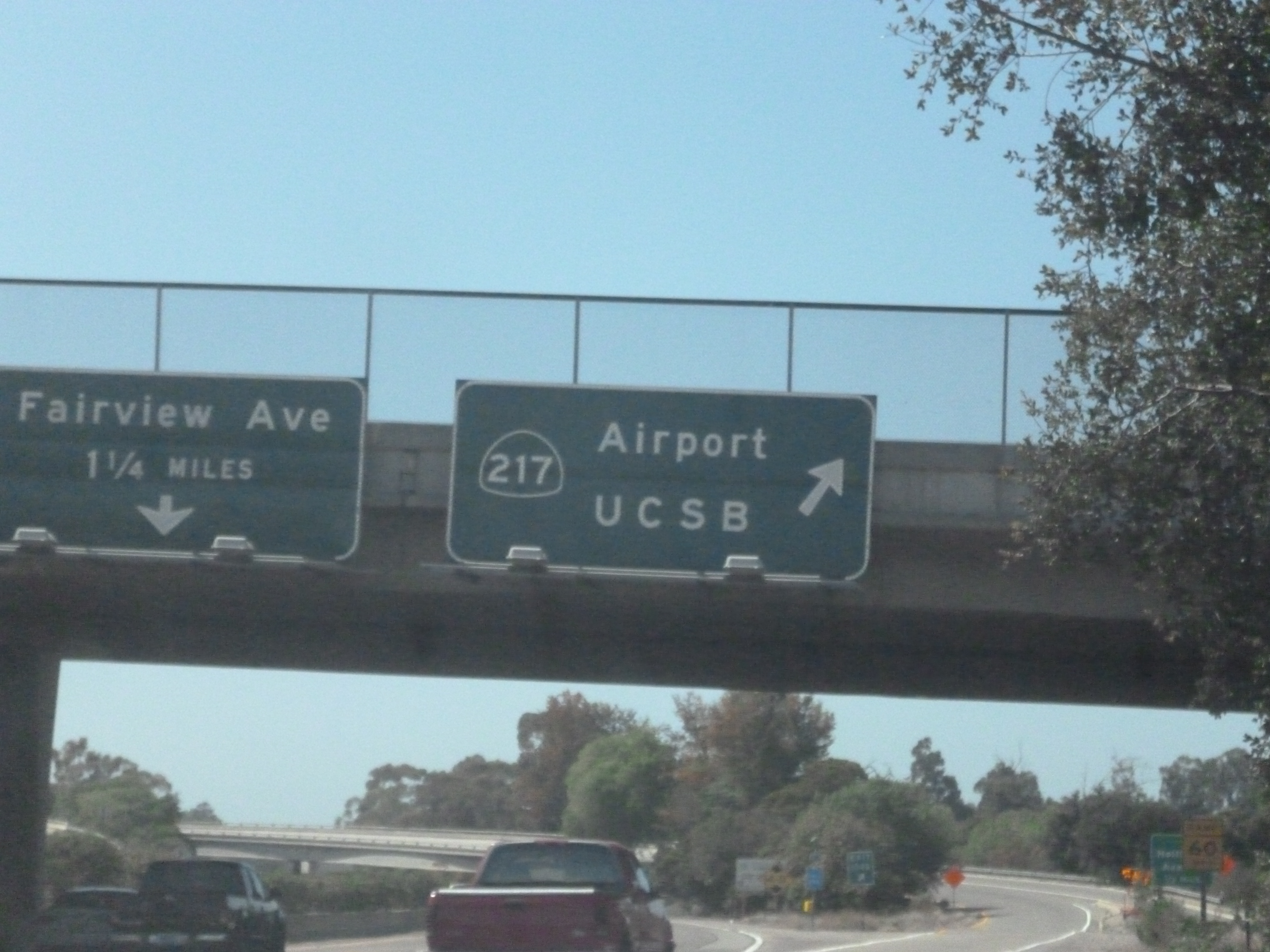
Sign on US 101 for SR 217 exit

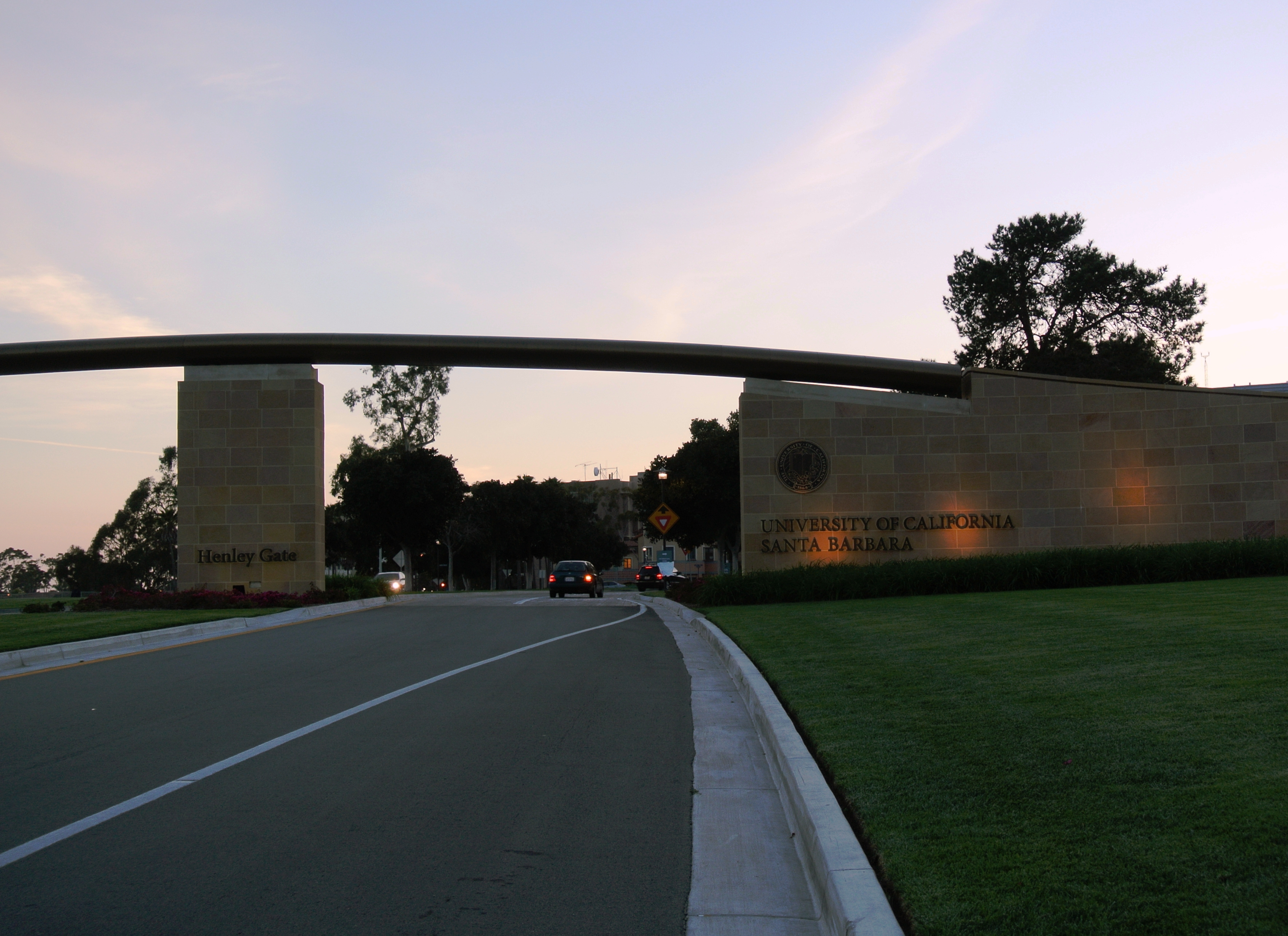
The Henley Gate at the UC Santa Barbara eastern entrance, located a few yards to the west of where SR 217 ends at the campus's official eastern boundary

Route 217 is defined in section 517 of the California Streets and Highways Code:

Route 217 is from:
(a) Route 101 near Ellwood to the campus of the University of California at Santa Barbara.
(b) The campus of the University of California at Santa Barbara to Route 101 northwest of the City of Santa Barbara.
Section (b) of this route shall be a memorial to the late Senator Clarence C. Ward of Santa Barbara County and shall hereafter be known as Clarence Ward Memorial Boulevard.

Route 217 was never fully constructed to extend west to near Ellwood as it is defined. In addition, section 517.1 permits the state to relinquish control of the segment "from the westerly end of both the East Goleta overhead and the Route 101-217 separation structures to the University of California, Santa Barbara property line" to local control.

SR 217 currently connects the University of California, Santa Barbara and the Santa Barbara Municipal Airport with U.S. Route 101, which is the major highway that connects Santa Barbara with other major cities along California's Pacific Coast. State Route 217 can be found about 6 miles (9.7 km) west of Central Santa Barbara. It is a freeway for its entire length.

SR 217 is part of the National Highway System, a network of highways that are considered essential to the country's economy, defense, and mobility by the Federal Highway Administration.

== Exit list ==
Except where prefixed with a letter, postmiles were measured on the road as it was in 1964, based on the alignment that existed at the time, and do not necessarily reflect current mileage. Postmile prefixes include: R reflecting a realignment in the route since then, M indicating a second realignment, L referring to an overlap due to a correction or change, and T indicating postmiles classified as temporary. Segments that remain unconstructed or have been relinquished to local control may be omitted. The entire route is in Santa Barbara County.

Location	Postmile	Exit	Destinations	Notes
Isla Vista	0.46		University of California, Santa Barbara eastern boundary	West end of SR 217; road continues to the Henley Gate
	0.93	1	Sandspit Road	Serves Santa Barbara Airport
Goleta	2.23	2	Hollister Avenue	
Goleta	2.76	3	Patterson Avenue to US 101 north (SR 1 north)	Eastbound exit and westbound entrance
Goleta	2.76		US 101 south (SR 1 south) – Santa Barbara	East end of SR 217; US 101 exit 104B
1.000 mi = 1.609 km; 1.000 km = 0.621 mi: Incomplete access
