= Twain Harte, California =

Twain Harte
- census-designated place
- The main entrance into Twain Harte after a snowstorm
- Motto: " Tuolumne County's Breath of Fresh Air "
- Location in Tuolumne County and the state of California

- Location in the United States
- Coordinates: 38°2′25″N 120°14′1″W
- Country: United States
- State: California
- County: Tuolumne

Area
  - Total: 3.718 sq mi (9.629 km^{2})
  - Land: 3.698 sq mi (9.579 km^{2})
  - Water: 0.019 sq mi (0.050 km^{2}) 0.51%
- Elevation: 3,648 ft (1,112 m)

Population (2020)
  - Total: 2,378
  - Density: 643.0/sq mi (248.3/km^{2})
- Time zone: UTC-8 (Pacific (PST))
  - Summer (DST): UTC-7 (PDT)
- ZIP code: 95383
- Area code: 209
- FIPS code: 06-80966
- GNIS feature ID: 1660049

Twain Harte is a census-designated place (CDP) in Tuolumne County, California, United States. The population was 2,378 at the 2020 census, up from 2,226 at the 2010 census. Its name is derived from the last names of two famous authors who lived in California, Mark Twain and Bret Harte.

== Geography ==
Twain Harte is located at 38°2′25″N 120°14′1″W (38.040390, -120.233671).

Twain Harte is situated in Tuolumne County along Highway 108 at an elevation of 3,640 feet (1,110 m).

The USPS zip code for Twain Harte is 95383.

According to the United States Census Bureau, the CDP has a total area of 3.7 square miles (9.6 km^{2}), of which 99.49% is land and 0.51% is water. Its municipal water supply comes from the nearby Lyons Reservoir in the Stanislaus National Forest.

Twain Harte is both a summer and winter vacation community situated at the transition zone between the oak forest of the California foothills and the mixed pine and fir forest of the Sierra Nevada. Summers are warm during the day and the nights are generally mild, making Twain Harte a pleasant escape from the long, hot summers of the California Central Valley. Winters can be very cool with snow occurring several times during the season. Winter sports venues are located nearby at Leland High Sierra Snowplay near Strawberry (snow tubing), Long Barn Lodge & Ice Skating Rink, and Dodge Ridge Ski Area near Pinecrest are all along Highway 108, plus the Badger Pass Ski Area in nearby Yosemite Park.

=== Climate ===
Climate data for Twain Harte, California
Month	Jan	Feb	Mar	Apr	May	Jun	Jul	Aug	Sep	Oct	Nov	Dec	Year
Record high °F (°C)	72 (22)	78 (26)	83 (28)	88 (31)	95 (35)	99 (37)	103 (39)	104 (40)	100 (38)	93 (34)	83 (28)	69 (21)	104 (40)
Mean daily maximum °F (°C)	47 (8)	51 (11)	56 (13)	61 (16)	69 (21)	77 (25)	85 (29)	84 (29)	79 (26)	69 (21)	55 (13)	46 (8)	65 (18)
Mean daily minimum °F (°C)	31 (−1)	31 (−1)	34 (1)	38 (3)	45 (7)	51 (11)	57 (14)	56 (13)	52 (11)	43 (6)	35 (2)	30 (−1)	42 (5)
Record low °F (°C)	−1 (−18)	1 (−17)	11 (−12)	16 (−9)	25 (−4)	31 (−1)	41 (5)	31 (−1)	32 (0)	23 (−5)	10 (−12)	2 (−17)	−1 (−18)
Average precipitation inches (mm)	6.30 (160)	6.09 (155)	5.56 (141)	3.32 (84)	2.14 (54)	.70 (18)	.28 (7.1)	.14 (3.6)	.80 (20)	2.41 (61)	4.39 (112)	5.79 (147)	37.92 (962.7)
Average snowfall inches (cm)	17 (43)	12.6 (32)	19.6 (50)	12 (30)	1 (2.5)	0 (0)	0 (0)	0 (0)	0 (0)	0.4 (1.0)	3.2 (8.1)	13.5 (34)	79.3 (200.6)
Source 1: The Weather Channel
Source 2: Intellicast

== Places of interest ==
Twain Harte is home to the Twain Harte Village (the largest shopping center in the area), Twain Harte Golf Club (a golf course design by Clark Glasson), and Twain Harte Lake (a man-made lake and small resort).

== Demographics ==
Historical population
Census	Pop.	Note	%±
1970	1,484		—
1980	1,369		−7.7%
1990	2,170		58.5%
2000	2,586		19.2%
2010	2,226		−13.9%
2020	2,378		6.8%
U.S. Decennial Census; 1860–1870 1880-1890; 1900 1910 1920; 1930 1940 1950; 1960 1970 1980; 1990 2000 2010

Twain Harte first appeared as an unincorporated community in the 1970 U.S. census; and as a census designated place in the 1980 U.S. census.

=== Racial and ethnic composition ===
Twain Harte CDP, California – Racial and ethnic composition Note: the US Census treats Hispanic/Latino as an ethnic category. This table excludes Latinos from the racial categories and assigns them to a separate category. Hispanics/Latinos may be of any race.
Race / Ethnicity (NH = Non-Hispanic)	Pop 2000	Pop 2010	Pop 2020	% 2000	% 2010	% 2020
White alone (NH)	2,317	1,936	2,001	89.60%	86.97%	84.15%
Black or African American alone (NH)	2	5	4	0.08%	0.22%	0.17%
Native American or Alaska Native alone (NH)	19	31	13	0.73%	1.39%	0.55%
Asian alone (NH)	16	30	20	0.62%	1.35%	0.84%
Native Hawaiian or Pacific Islander alone (NH)	14	3	4	0.54%	0.13%	0.17%
Other race alone (NH)	4	2	20	0.15%	0.09%	0.84%
Mixed race or Multiracial (NH)	71	48	127	2.75%	2.16%	5.34%
Hispanic or Latino (any race)	143	171	189	5.53%	7.68%	7.95%
Total	2,586	2,226	2,378	100.00%	100.00%	100.00%

=== 2020 census ===
As of the 2020 census, Twain Harte had a population of 2,378. The population density was 642.9 inhabitants per square mile (248.2/km^{2}). The median age was 53.2 years. For every 100 females, there were 100.5 males, and for every 100 females age 18 and over, there were 103.5 males.

The Census reported that the whole population lived in households. 96.7% of residents lived in urban areas, while 3.3% lived in rural areas.

There were 1,088 households, of which 19.8% had children under the age of 18 living in them. Of all households, 49.4% were married-couple households, 6.8% were cohabiting couple households, 23.8% had a female householder with no spouse or partner present, and 20.0% had a male householder with no spouse or partner present. About 28.0% of households were one person households, and 13.9% had someone living alone who was 65 years of age or older. The average household size was 2.19. There were 714 families (65.6% of all households).

The age distribution was 15.9% under the age of 18, 5.8% aged 18 to 24, 19.4% aged 25 to 44, 27.6% aged 45 to 64, and 31.3% who were 65 years of age or older.

There were 2,154 housing units at an average density of 582.3 units per square mile (224.8 units/km^{2}), of which 1,088 (50.5%) were occupied and 49.5% were vacant. Of occupied units, 72.2% were owner-occupied and 27.8% were occupied by renters. The homeowner vacancy rate was 3.2% and the rental vacancy rate was 9.0%.

Racial composition as of the 2020 census
Race	Number	Percent
White	2,061	86.7%
Black or African American	5	0.2%
American Indian and Alaska Native	20	0.8%
Asian	27	1.1%
Native Hawaiian and Other Pacific Islander	5	0.2%
Some other race	45	1.9%
Two or more races	215	9.0%

=== Income and poverty ===
In 2023, the US Census Bureau estimated that the median household income was $87,018, and the per capita income was $57,270. About 4.3% of families and 7.2% of the population were below the poverty line.

=== 2010 census ===
The 2010 United States census reported that Twain Harte had a population of 2,226. The population density was 598.6 inhabitants per square mile (231.1/km^{2}). The racial makeup of Twain Harte was 2,026 (91.0%) White, 5 (0.2%) African American, 34 (1.5%) Native American, 31 (1.4%) Asian, 4 (0.2%) Pacific Islander, 46 (2.1%) from other races, and 80 (3.6%) from two or more races. Hispanic or Latino of any race were 171 persons (7.7%).

The Census reported that 2,226 people (100% of the population) lived in households, 0 (0%) lived in non-institutionalized group quarters, and 0 (0%) were institutionalized.

There were 1,014 households, out of which 198 (19.5%) had children under the age of 18 living in them, 544 (53.6%) were opposite-sex married couples living together, 83 (8.2%) had a female householder with no husband present, 50 (4.9%) had a male householder with no wife present. There were 56 (5.5%) unmarried opposite-sex partnerships, and 6 (0.6%) same-sex married couples or partnerships. 273 households (26.9%) were made up of individuals, and 125 (12.3%) had someone living alone who was 65 years of age or older. The average household size was 2.20. There were 677 families (66.8% of all households); the average family size was 2.60.

The population was spread out, with 355 people (15.9%) under the age of 18, 137 people (6.2%) aged 18 to 24, 387 people (17.4%) aged 25 to 44, 772 people (34.7%) aged 45 to 64, and 575 people (25.8%) who were 65 years of age or older. The median age was 52.0 years. For every 100 females, there were 105.9 males. For every 100 females age 18 and over, there were 103.8 males.

There were 2,148 housing units at an average density of 577.7 per square mile (223.1/km^{2}), of which 717 (70.7%) were owner-occupied, and 297 (29.3%) were occupied by renters. The homeowner vacancy rate was 3.5%; the rental vacancy rate was 12.0%. 1,501 people (67.4% of the population) lived in owner-occupied housing units and 725 people (32.6%) lived in rental housing units.

== Government ==
In the California State Legislature, Twain Harte is in the 4th senatorial district, represented by Republican Marie Alvarado-Gil, and the 8th Assembly district, represented by Republican David Tangipa.

In the United States House of Representatives, Twain Harte is in California's 5th congressional district, represented by Republican Tom McClintock.

== See also ==
- Bret Harte, California, a CDP in Stanislaus County
