= Dodge Ridge Ski Area =

Ski area near Pinecrest, California in Tuolumne County

Dodge Ridge Wintersports Area
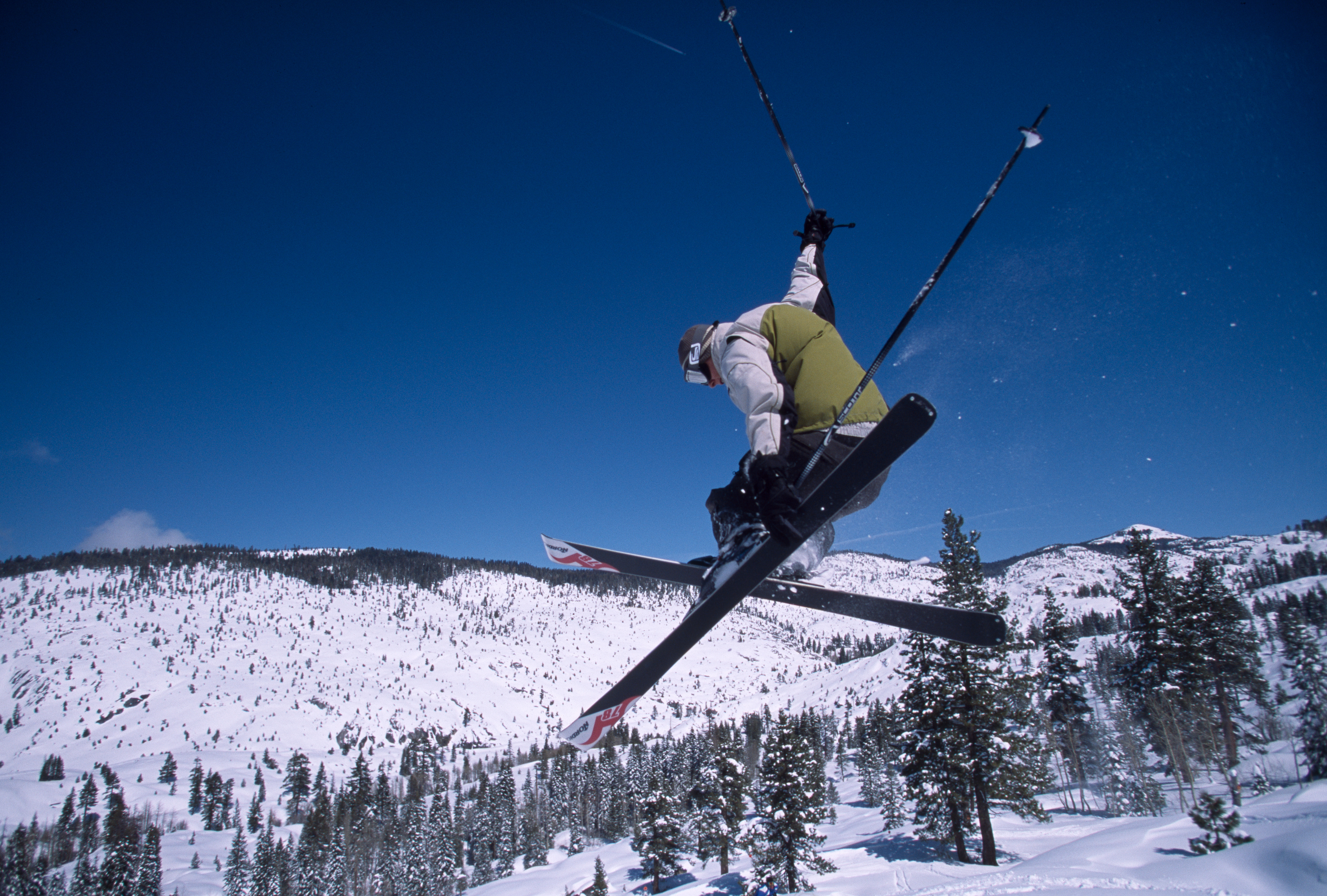
- Jumper in Boulder Creek Canyon

- Location in California Dodge Ridge Wintersports Area (the United States)
- Location: Dodge Ridge
- Nearest city: Pinecrest, California
- Coordinates: 38.1896°N 119.9564°W
- Vertical: 1,600 ft (490 m)
- Top elevation: 8,200 ft (2,500 m)
- Base elevation: 6,600 ft (2,000 m)
- Skiable area: 862 acres (349 ha)
- Trails: 62 total 20% beginner 40% intermediate 34% advanced
- Longest run: 2 mi (3.2 km) (Stagecoach)
- Lift system: 12 lifts: 1 quad, 2 triples, 5 doubles, 4 surface
- Terrain parks: Progression; Stagecoach; Rocky's Road
- Snowfall: 300 to 500 in (760 to 1,270 cm)
- Night skiing: None
- Website: www.dodgeridge.com

Dodge Ridge Wintersports Area is a ski area near Pinecrest, California in Tuolumne County, off of Highway 108, 30 mi (48 km) east of Sonora. The resort is located in the Stanislaus National Forest and operates under a special use permit. Many skiers in Northern California use Dodge Ridge because of its proximity to the San Francisco Bay Area, San Joaquin Valley and Yosemite National Park. The winter sports season typically lasts from late November through mid April. The mountain summit sits at 8,200' above sea level. Dodge Ridge was founded by various individuals, and managed by the Purdy family, in 1950, and then owned by the Helm family from 1976 up until the 2021-2022 season, when it was acquired by Invision Capital and Karl Kapusciniski. Dodge Ridge is a member of Powder Alliance, which offers reciprocal ski passes to season pass holders of various resorts. Beginning in the 2021/2022 season Dodge Ridge began to experiment with "light snowmaking at the base."

== Alpine skiing & Snowboarding ==
Dodge Ridge, has 862 acres (349 ha) that are skiable, offering options for skiing, snowboarding, and more. There are 67 total runs and 12 lifts. 20% of the trails are for beginners, and 40% of the trails are marked for intermediate as well as 34% for advanced skiers and snowboarders. There are 3+ terrain parks from easy to advanced throughout the mountain, depending on snow accumulation. These can include the Stagecoach park, T-643, Ry's Run Park, and the Clementine Roller Progression Park. The most advanced park is the Stagecoach park which includes a staircase insert, a 14-foot wall, and large jumps.

In addition, Dodge Ridge offers both individual and group lessons in skiing and snowboarding for children and adults and teens.

== Cross-country skiing ==
There are a number of cross-country ski trails close to the Dodge Ridge Ski area. The Pinecrest Cross Country & Snowshoe Network website has more information.

== Tubing and Sledding ==
During the 2021/2022 season, Dodge Ridge added tubing and sledding activities at the base.

== Mountain Biking ==
In the summer of 2022, Dodge Ridge added chairlifts to support mountain biking, in addition to disc golf.

== Base facilities ==
In 2007, a new family lodge opened at Dodge Ridge Wintersports Area, as part of a major expansion of the facilities at the base. The lodge includes a children's center, a bistro, and a ticket center. The rental center was renovated before the start of the 2008 season, and the parking lots recently repaved. There are several restaurants available at the Dodge Ridge, including the Creekside Café and Boulder Bar, and the North Fork Bistro.
