= Lyons Dam =

Coordinates: 38°05′39″N 120°10′02″W

- Interactive map of Lyons Dam
- Country: United States
- Location: Tuolumne County, California
- Status: Operational
- Opening date: 1916

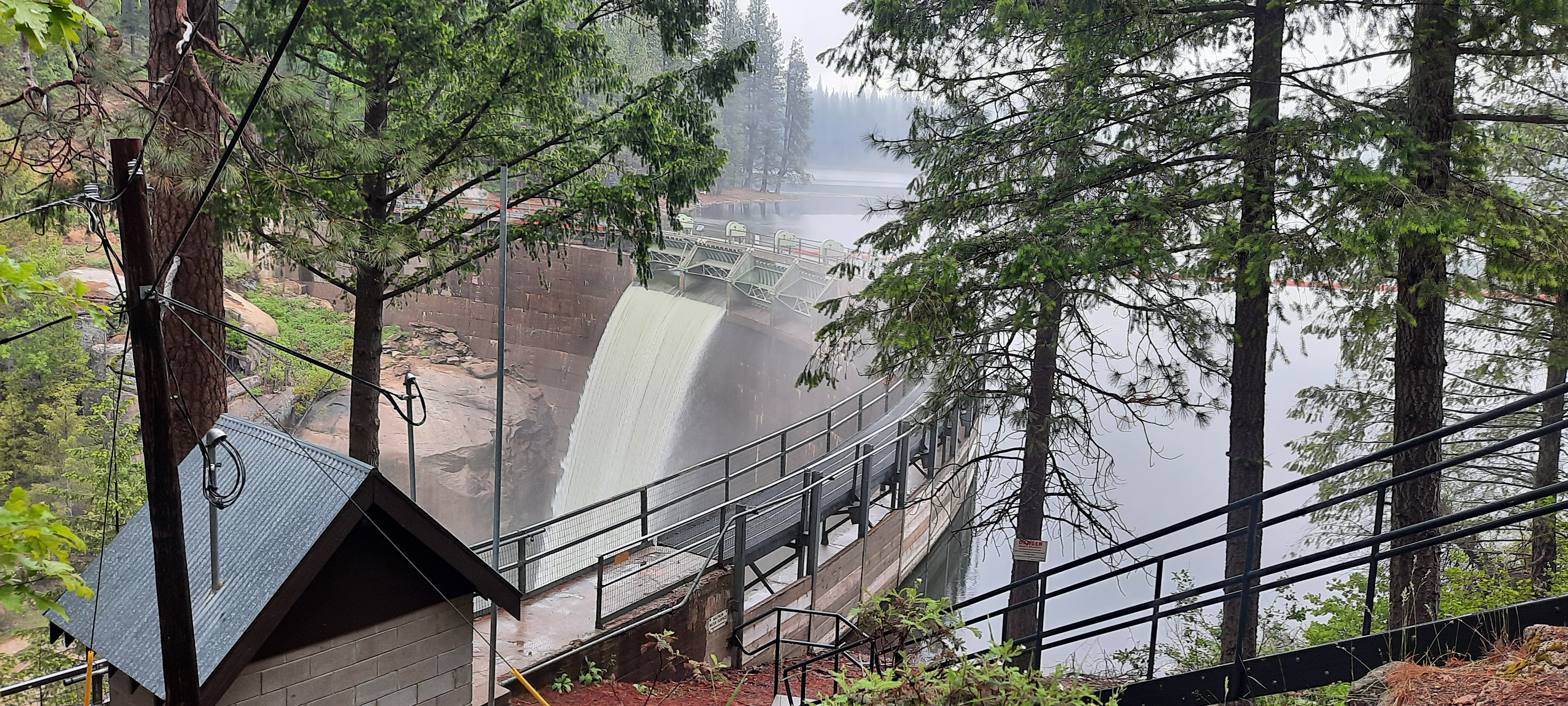
Water flowing through Lyon's Dam

Lyons Dam (National ID # CA00387) is a dam in Tuolumne County, California.

The concrete single-arch dam was constructed in 1930 (96 years ago) by the Pacific Gas and Electric Company, with a height of 132 feet (40 m) and a length of 535 feet (163 m) at its crest. It impounds the South Fork Stanislaus River for the municipal water supply of the Twain Harte, California area. Owned and operated by Pacific Gas and Electric Company, the largest private owner of hydroelectric facilities in the United States, it is one of the company's 174 dams.

The reservoir it creates, Lyons Reservoir, has a normal water surface of 184 acres (74 ha), and a maximum capacity of 6,400 acre-feet (7,900,000 m^{3}). Recreation includes fishing. The site is surrounded by the Stanislaus National Forest. In 2012, about 625 acres (253 ha) of adjacent land known as the Rushing Meadows parcel was transferred from PG&E's ownership to the National Forest Service, as part of the utility's bankruptcy settlement.

Water from Lyons Dam flows through penstock to Phoenix Powerhouse.

== See also ==
- List of dams and reservoirs in California
- List of lakes in California
