= Clark Glasson =

- Born: Franklin Clark Glasson; October 13, 1913; San Jose, California
- Died: January 2, 1994 (aged 80); Shasta, California
- Other names: Clark Glasson
- Occupation: Golf course architect
- Known for: 9 courses designed in California, mostly in Northern California and the San Francisco Bay Area

Franklin Clark Glasson (October 13, 1913 - January 2, 1994) was an American architect known for his design and construction of golf courses in the western United States primarily during the 1950s and 60s. Over his career Glasson designed, constructed (sometimes personally), and operated nine golf courses that are still in operation.

== Career ==
Glasson was actively involved in the construction and operation of the courses he designed. He operated the Deep Cliff course in Cupertino, California from its construction in 1961 until its sale to a private golf course operator, John Telischak in 1992.

In at least one instance, on the Fall River Mills course, he did the excavation and grading work himself. This course was built on the site of a former dump and was littered with "ice boxes, car bodies, and washing machines". Glasson is said to have been excavating the site one day when his backhoe became stuck. An onlooker began laughing at his predicament and when Glasson went to confront this person he discovered it was his neighbor and then owner of the Rising River Ranch, Bing Crosby. Both gentleman laughed about the situation and went on to become friends.

== Golf courses designed ==
The following is a list of the golf courses designed by Glasson in California. Ten are listed, two (Palm and Cypress) are located at the same facility.

| Course Name | Type | Year built | Location | # of holes | Par |
|---|---|---|---|---|---|
| Arrowhead Country Club | Public | | San Bernardino | 18 | 72 |
| Cypress at Sunol Valley Golf Course | Public | | Sunol | | |
| Deep Cliff Golf Course | Public | 1961 | Cupertino | 18 | 60* |
| Fall River Valley Golf & Country Club | Public | 1978 | Fall River Mills | 18 | |
| Palm at Sunol Valley Golf Course | Public | 1967 | Sunol | 18 | 72 |
| Palo Alto Hills Golf & Country Club | Private | 1958 | Palo Alto | 18 | 71 |
| San Ramon Royal Vista Golf Course | Public | 1963 | San Ramon | 18 | 72 |
| Shasta Valley Golf Club | Public | 1968 | Montague | 9 | 36 |
| Sunken Gardens Golf Course | Public | 1959 | Sunnyvale | 9 | |
| Twain Harte Golf Club | Public | 1961 | Twain Harte | 9 | 64 |
| Wikiup Golf Course | Public | 1963 | Santa Rosa | | |

* denotes unique feature or aspect

== Personal life ==
Glasson was born in San Jose, California and developed an interest in the sport of golf at an early age. He caddied at the Los Altos Hills Golf and Country Club for eight years. He died in Shasta, California.

== See also ==
- List of golf course architects
