= California State Route 132 =

Highway in California

State Route 132
- SR 132 highlighted in red

Route information
- Maintained by Caltrans
- Length: 76.36 mi (122.89 km)

Major junctions
- West end: I-580 near Tracy
- I-5 near Vernalis; SR 33 near Vernalis; SR 99 / SR 108 in Modesto
- East end: SR 49 at Coulterville

Location
- Country: United States
- State: California
- Counties: San Joaquin, Stanislaus, Tuolumne, Mariposa

Highway system
- State highways in California; Interstate; US; State; Scenic; History; Pre‑1964; Unconstructed; Deleted; Freeways
← SR 131	→ SR 133

State Route 132 (SR 132) is a state highway in the U.S. state of California that connects the Central Valley with the Sierra Nevada foothills and the California Gold Country. Its western segment also connects the city of Modesto with the San Francisco Bay Area via I-580, although this route is discouraged due to it being a two-lane road between Modesto and Interstate 5 (motorists are instead encouraged to take SR 120 in Manteca to I-5 and I-205 to I-580). East of Modesto, the road climbs the foothills and eventually ends at SR 49 at Coulterville.

Portions between I-580 and I-5 are a four-lane freeway, and there are plans to upgrade the portion between I-5 and SR 99 in Modesto to an expressway, with 3 mi (4.8 km) west of SR 99 currently open as a divided two-lane freeway. Route 132 is a two-lane road important to recreational travelers en route to Modesto Reservoir, Turlock Reservoir, Don Pedro Reservoir and the Sierra Nevada foothills.

== Route description ==
Route 132 is defined in section 432 of the California Streets and Highways Code:

Route 132 is from:
(a) Route 580 west of Vernalis to Route 99 at Modesto.
(b) Route 99 to Route 49.

SR 132 begins in San Joaquin County at Interstate 580, heading eastward as a four-lane freeway, though eastbound it narrows to a single lane for a very short distance before Bird Road (exit 2), where it then regains two lanes. After an interchange with Interstate 5, the freeway segment ends and continues as a two-lane highway. After passing SR 33 at an interchange, it enters Stanislaus County, where it intersects CR J3 (Kasson Road / River Road). It then heads eastward, then turns north on Dakota Avenue for a short length before turning east onto a divided two-lane freeway through the city of Modesto, where it intersects SR 99 and SR 108. At the east side of the city, it has a very short concurrency with CR J7 as it exits Modesto and enters Empire. As it exits Empire, it intersects numerous county roads as it exits Stanislaus County and enters Tuolumne County. After several miles, it exits Tuolumne County and enters Mariposa County, reaching its east end at SR 49 in Coulterville.

Its county route counterpart, CR J132, is adjacent from the east end of SR 132 on the opposite side of SR 49 and heads roughly northeast out of Coulterville on Greeley Hill Road and, later, Smith Station Road, eventually ending at SR 120.

SR 132 is part of the California Freeway and Expressway System, and west of the eastern Modesto city limits is part of the National Highway System, a network of highways that are considered essential to the country's economy, defense, and mobility by the Federal Highway Administration.

== History ==
The route was established in 1934 from modern day SR 33 to SR 49; in 1959 it was extended west to I-5, and in 1963 to the present-day western terminus at I-580.

A major accident occurred on March 5, 1983, when a collision involving a patrol car and another car with three Secret Service agents inside occurred, killing all three Secret Service agents. This was due to the unusual curve that the road takes on near the end of its course in Mariposa County, created in order to support the hills of the Sierra Nevada. The patrol car was hired for a visit that Queen Elizabeth II was planning to Yosemite National Park in March 1983.

The city-built "Kansas-Needham Overhead", connecting Kansas Avenue and Needham Street over the Union Pacific Railroad's Fresno Subdivision in Modesto, was aligned for a future connection to a SR 132 expressway west of Modesto. Construction of the first phase of the expressway project began in 2019 and was completed in September 2022 as a divided two-lane freeway. The new alignment starts at the intersection of Maze Boulevard (SR 132) and Dakota Avenue where SR 132 travels north on Dakota for a short distance and then turns east onto the newly-built two-lane freeway to SR 99 and Needham Street, where SR 132 then travels southeast on new one-way auxiliary roadways of 5th and 6th Streets alongside SR 99 (though it is not co-routed) to the interchange of Maze Boulevard, meeting up with SR 108 and SR 132's present day alignment.

== Future ==
A second phase of the SR 132 expressway project west of Modesto is in the proposal stage. It is planned to connect to the recently completed freeway at Dakota Avenue to an approximate location near the intersection of Maze Boulevard (SR 132) and Gates Road / Paradise Road.

== Major intersections ==
Except where prefixed with a letter, postmiles were measured on the road as it was in 1964, based on the alignment that existed at the time, and do not necessarily reflect current mileage. Postmile prefixes include: R reflecting a realignment in the route since then, M indicating a second realignment, L referring to an overlap due to a correction or change, and T indicating postmiles classified as temporary. Segments that remain unconstructed or have been relinquished to local control may be omitted. The numbers reset at county lines; the start and end postmiles in each county are given in the county column.

County	Location	Postmile	Exit	Destinations	Notes
San Joaquin; SJ 0.00-7.11		0.00	—	I-580 west – San Francisco	Westbound exit and eastbound entrance; access to I-580 east to I-5 south is via exit 3A directly; west end of SR 132; I-580 east exit 76
San Joaquin; SJ 0.00-7.11		0.24	1	Chrisman Road	
San Joaquin; SJ 0.00-7.11		2.24	2	Bird Road	
San Joaquin; SJ 0.00-7.11		3.24	3A	I-5 south – Los Angeles	I-5 exits 449A-B
San Joaquin; SJ 0.00-7.11		3.24	3B	I-5 north – Stockton	I-5 exits 449A-B
San Joaquin; SJ 0.00-7.11		4.09	East end of freeway		
San Joaquin; SJ 0.00-7.11	Vernalis	R5.86		SR 33 – Tracy, Patterson	Interchange
Stanislaus; STA 0.00-51.01		1.43		CR J3 (Kasson Road) / River Road	Southern terminus of CR J3
Stanislaus; STA 0.00-51.01		11.39		Maze Boulevard east, Dakota Avenue south	Former SR 132 east
Stanislaus; STA 0.00-51.01				Dakota Avenue north	
Stanislaus; STA 0.00-51.01			West end of freeway		
Stanislaus; STA 0.00-51.01	Modesto		East end of freeway (westbound only)		
Stanislaus; STA 0.00-51.01	Modesto		—	Needham Street, Kansas Avenue Extension to SR 99 / Kansas Avenue	Left exit eastbound; at-grade intersection westbound; Needham Street not signed eastbound
Stanislaus; STA 0.00-51.01	Modesto		—	Washington Street	Interchange; westbound exit and entrance
Stanislaus; STA 0.00-51.01	Modesto		East end of freeway (eastbound only)		
Stanislaus; STA 0.00-51.01	Modesto	14.73		SR 99 / Maze Boulevard west – Stockton, Merced	Interchange; west end of SR 108 overlap; western terminus of SR 108; SR 99 north exit 226, south exit 226B; Maze Boulevard is former SR 132 west
Stanislaus; STA 0.00-51.01	Modesto	L14.98– L15.06		SR 108 east (K Street) – Sonora	East end of SR 108 overlap
Stanislaus; STA 0.00-51.01	Modesto	L15.71		9th Street, D Street – Merced	
Stanislaus; STA 0.00-51.01	Modesto	17.14		El Vista Avenue, Mitchell Road – Riverbank, Ceres	Mitchell Road serves Modesto City–County Airport
Stanislaus; STA 0.00-51.01	Modesto	19.13		CR J7 north (Claus Road) / Garner Road	West end of CR J7 overlap
Stanislaus; STA 0.00-51.01	Empire	20.10		CR J7 south (Santa Fe Avenue)	East end of CR J7 overlap
Stanislaus; STA 0.00-51.01		23.14		CR J14 (Albers Road, Geer Road) – Oakdale, Turlock	
Stanislaus; STA 0.00-51.01	Waterford	28.00		CR J9 (F Street, Hickman Road) – Oakdale, Hickman, Montpelier	
Stanislaus; STA 0.00-51.01	La Grange	45.81		CR J59 (La Grange Road) – Snelling, Merced, Don Pedro Dam, Sonora	
Tuolumne; TUO 0.00-R7.64		4.02		Bonds Flat Road – Don Pedro Lake	
Tuolumne; TUO 0.00-R7.64		6.32		Merced Falls Road	
Mariposa; MPA R7.64-18.75	Coulterville	18.75		SR 49 – Yosemite, Sonora, Mariposa	East end of SR 132
1.000 mi = 1.609 km; 1.000 km = 0.621 mi: Concurrency terminus; Incomplete access
