= Dardanelle, California =

Unincorporated community in California, United States

- Unincorporated community
- Location within California Location within the United States
- Coordinates: 38°20′28″N 119°50′02″W
- Country: United States
- State: California
- County: Tuolumne
- Elevation: 5,774 ft (1,760 m)

Population (2016)
  - Total: 35
- Time zone: UTC-8 (Pacific (PST))
  - Summer (DST): UTC-7 (PDT)
- Area code: 209
- GNIS feature ID: 1655949

Dardanelle is an unincorporated community in the Stanislaus National Forest in Tuolumne County, California, United States. It is located on California State Route 108, 39 miles (63 km) northeast of Sonora. Its post office ZIP code is 95314. Dardanelle has a population of 35.

Dardanelle is a community of cabins authorized by the United States Forest Service under the Occupancy Permits Act.
