= California State Route 68 =

Highway in California

State Route 68

- SR 68 highlighted in red

Route information
- Maintained by Caltrans
- Length: 22.02 mi (35.44 km)
- Tourist routes: SR 68 between SR 1 and the Salinas River

Major junctions
- West end: Asilomar State Beach in Pacific Grove
- SR 1 in Monterey; SR 218 near Del Rey Oaks
- East end: US 101 in Salinas

Location
- Country: United States
- State: California
- Counties: Monterey

Highway system
- State highways in California; Interstate; US; State; Scenic; History; Pre‑1964; Unconstructed; Deleted; Freeways
← SR 67	→ SR 70

State Route 68 (SR 68) is a state highway in the U.S. state of California, located entirely in Monterey County. It runs from Asilomar State Beach in Pacific Grove to U.S. Route 101 in Salinas. The approximately 20-mile (32 km) long highway serves as a major route between the Monterey Peninsula and Salinas.

== Route description ==
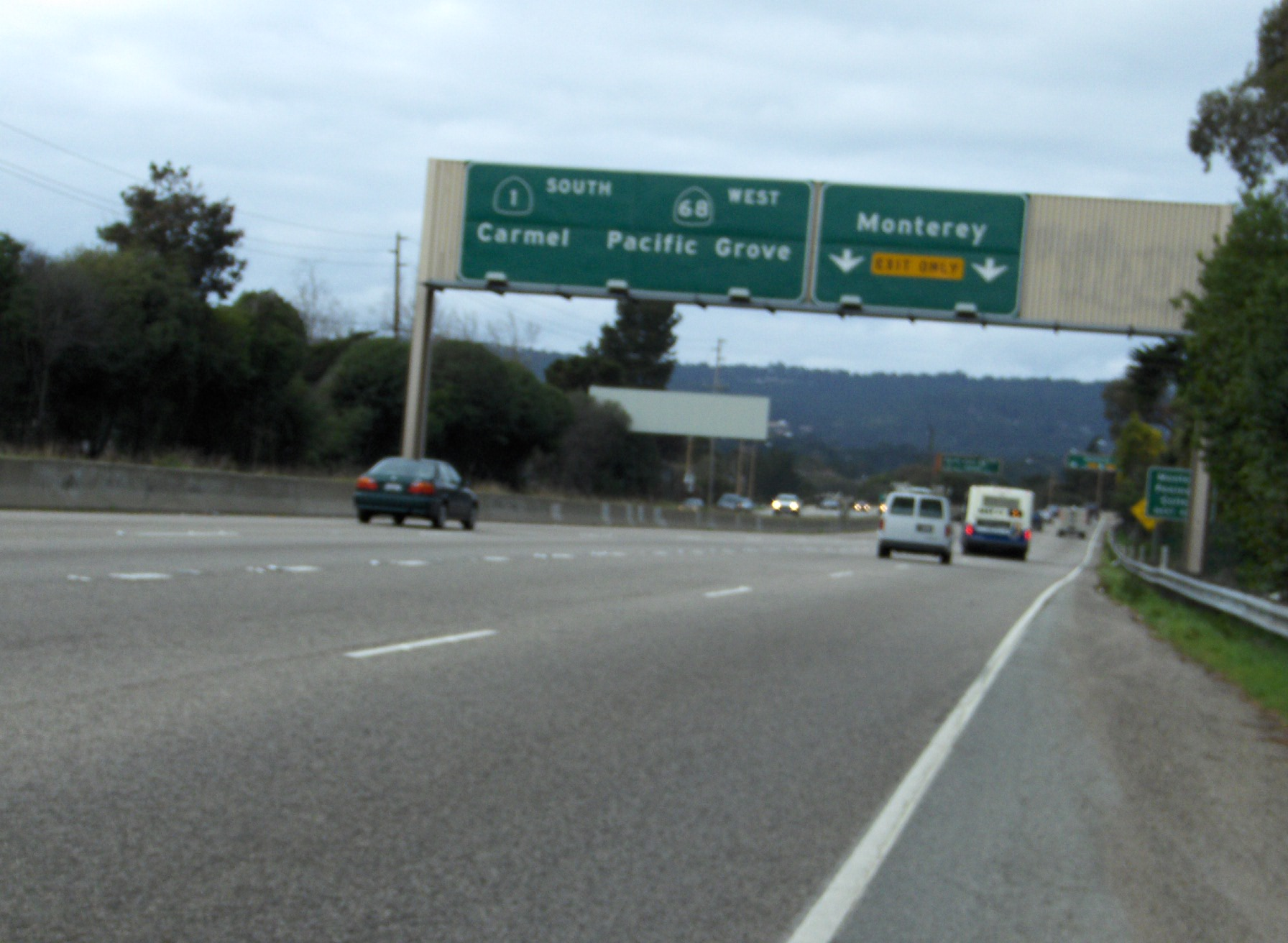
SR 68 westbound concurrent with SR 1 southbound in Monterey

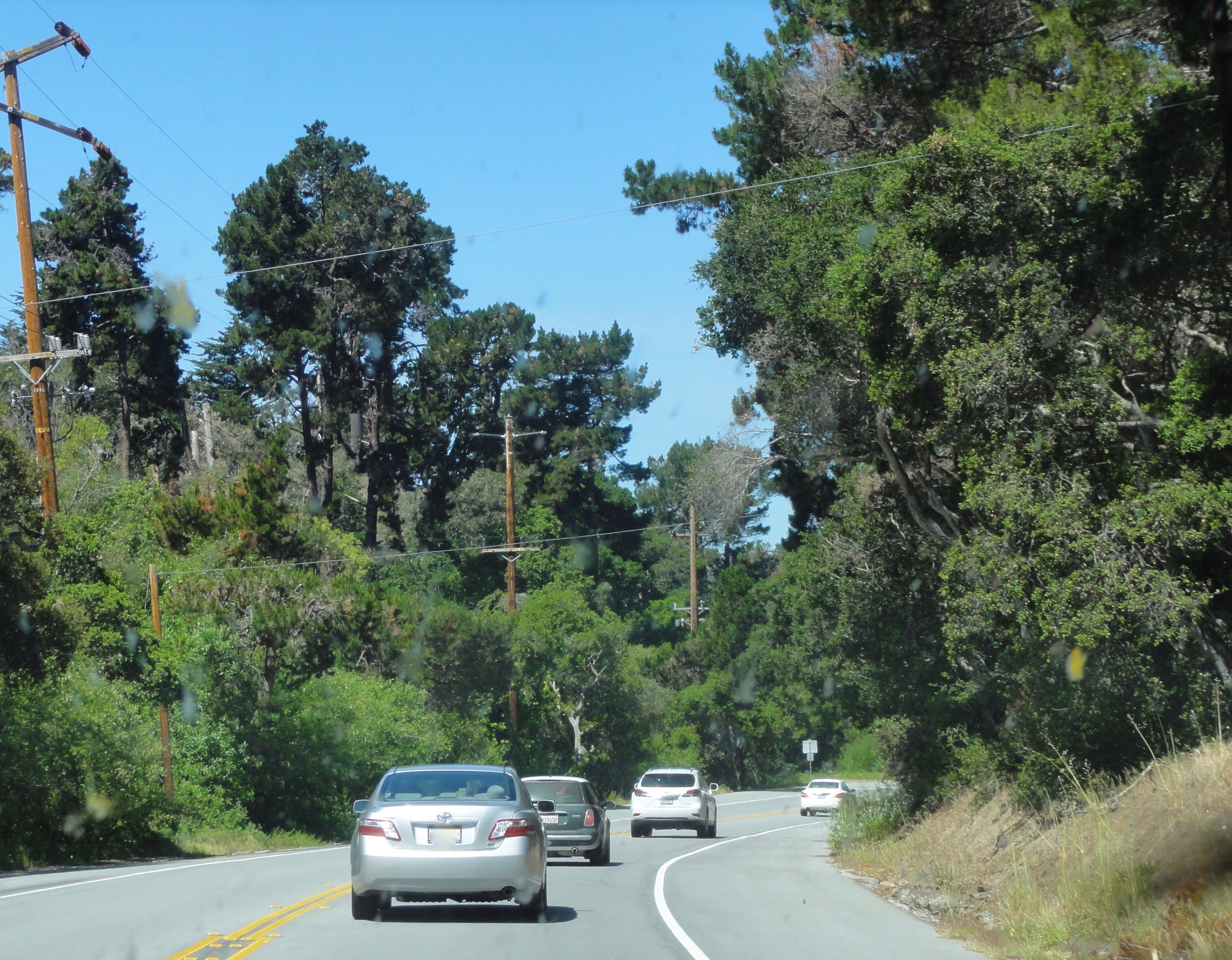
SR 68 eastbound approaching the Monterey Peninsula

Route 68 is defined in section 368, subdivision (a), of the California Streets and Highways Code:

Route 68 is from:
(1) Asilomar State Beach to Route 1.
(2) Monterey to Route 101 in Salinas.

The definition omits the concurrency with Route 1 instead of duplicating that segment in the other route's definition in the code. Subdivision (b) permits the state to relinquish control of the segment of the highway between Asilomar State Beach and Route 1 in Pacific Grove and unincorporated Monterey County to local jurisdictions.

SR 68 begins as Asilomar Avenue in the city of Pacific Grove at an intersection with Sinex Avenue, at the entrance to Asilomar Conference Grounds of Asilomar State Beach. The highway continues south to an intersection with Sunset Drive, turning east on Sunset Drive before continuing south after roughly half a mile onto Forest Avenue. Soon after entering Monterey and passing by the Presidio of Monterey, SR 68 becomes the W.R. Holman Highway until its junction with SR 1 at the terminus of the 17 Mile Drive.

SR 68 is concurrent with SR 1 for 2.5 miles (4.0 km) until nearing the Monterey County Fairgrounds. At this point, SR 68 exits SR 1 as the Monterey-Salinas Highway, which is a freeway for the first half mile. The freeway becomes a highway and passes by the Monterey Regional Airport, intersecting SR 218 at Del Rey Oaks, continuing for 17 miles (27 km) towards Salinas. The route goes past Pasadera, WeatherTech Raceway Laguna Seca, Laureles Grade, Corral De Tierra, San Benancio, Toro Park and Spreckels, becoming a freeway for the last 3 miles (4.8 km) before Salinas, eventually turning north. At the city limits, SR 68 becomes South Main Street and continues to downtown. SR 68 makes a right off of Main and follows John Street to its terminus at U.S. Route 101.

Highway 68 is heavily traveled. The road has a design capacity of 16,000 vehicles per day. As of 2006, it carries about 26,000 vehicles per day, and this figure is projected to increase as residential development in and around Salinas continues, and the Monterey Peninsula's tourism economy continues to expand. Highway 68 and the "68" road symbol have become iconic in Pacific Grove skating culture. This association developed after the opening of the skate shop "68 Skate".

SR 68 is part of the California Freeway and Expressway System, and east of SR 1 is part of the National Highway System, a network of highways that are considered essential to the country's economy, defense, and mobility by the Federal Highway Administration. SR 68 is eligible for the State Scenic Highway System; however, only the part from SR 1 to the Salinas River is designated by Caltrans as a scenic highway. The Monterey-Salinas Highway is a California Scenic Route because of its views of the chaparral and springtime lupin for 14 miles (23 km) between State Route 1 in Monterey to the Salinas River. State Route 68 is part of the Juan De Anza Trail.

== History ==
Highway 68 is part of the DeAnza Trail, a route that linked all of California's mission settlements during the Spanish colonial period. With the advent of the automobile, Highway 68 was upgraded from a dirt wagon road to a 2-lane paved road in 1937.

During the 1950s and 1960s, Caltrans had planned to upgrade Highway 68 to a freeway between Salinas and Highway 1 in Monterey, that was to start at US 101 south of the city and proceed west between Salinas and Spreckels, serving as a bypass for Salinas. The freeway was to then follow the existing Highway 68 alignment into Monterey.

The freeway plan died as a result of environmental concerns along the route. The only portions of this freeway that were actually built were a 1-mile (1.6 km) section approaching the Highway 1 interchange in Monterey, and a 3-mile (4.8 km) segment starting in Spreckels and heading west, bypassing the unincorporated village of Toro Park. The segment around Spreckels opened in 1967 and included a pair of new bridges spanning the Salinas River, which replaced an old truss bridge built in 1889. At the western terminus of the Spreckels freeway segment, land acquired for the freeway can still be seen.

There continues to be discussions, but no definitive plans, to either bypass Route 68 or convert the existing road to 4-lanes by building a second roadway alongside the present 2-lane carriageway. Caltrans and Monterey County officials mention the most practical route for a bypass would be to the north of the existing Route 68, through Fort Ord. A major upgrade of the Highway 68 corridor would cost on the order of $300 million. In the fall of 2007, Caltrans is scheduled to begin a $6 million project to implement safety upgrades at three major intersections along Highway 68.

Meanwhile, Caltrans and Monterey County are proceeding with a plan to divert Monterey-Salinas traffic away from Highway 68 by converting Davis Road and Reservation Road from two lanes to four between Highway 101 on the north side of Salinas and Highway 1 in Marina. These two roads pass through Fort Ord and the upgrades are using excess land set aside following the base's closure in 1994. The Davis Road/Reservation Road upgrade is a short-term fix, and most state and county officials realize that a permanent fix for Highway 68 will eventually be necessary.

== Major intersections ==
Except where prefixed with a letter, postmiles were measured on the road as it was in 1964, based on the alignment that existed at the time, and do not necessarily reflect current mileage. Postmile prefixes include: R reflecting a realignment in the route since then, M indicating a second realignment, L referring to an overlap due to a correction or change, and T indicating postmiles classified as temporary. Segments that remain unconstructed or have been relinquished to local control may be omitted. The entire route is in Monterey County.

Location	Postmile	Exit	Destinations	Notes
Pacific Grove	0.00		Sinex Avenue – Asilomar State Beach	West end of SR 68
Pacific Grove			17-Mile Drive	
Monterey	L4.26 75.14 (Note: Indicates that the postmile represents the distance along SR 1 rather than SR 68.)		SR 1 south / 17-Mile Drive – Carmel	Interchange; west end of SR 1 overlap; SR 1 exit 399A
Monterey	L4.26 75.14	West end of freeway on SR 1		
Monterey	R75.75	399B	Munras Avenue – Monterey	No eastbound entrance
Monterey	R76.00	399C	Soledad Drive, Munras Avenue	Westbound exit and eastbound entrance
Monterey	R77.38	401A	Aguajito Road – Monterey	
Monterey	R78.12 R3.95	7B	SR 1 north – Santa Cruz, San Francisco	East end of SR 1 overlap; SR 1 exit 401B
Monterey	R3.99	7B	North Fremont Street – Seaside	No eastbound entrance; signed as exit 401B eastbound
Monterey		East end of freeway		
Del Rey Oaks	6.81		SR 218 west (Canyon del Rey Road) / Monterra Road – Del Rey Oaks, Seaside	
	11.22		CR G20 (Laureles Grade) – Carmel Valley	
		West end of freeway		
	15.83	19	Portola Drive	
	R17.19	20	CR G17 (River Road, Reservation Road)	
	R18.08	21	Spreckels Boulevard	
		East end of freeway		
Salinas	19.97		Blanco Road to US 101	
Salinas	22.02		US 101	Interchange; east end of SR 68; US 101 exit 327
Salinas	22.02		John Street	Continuation beyond US 101
1.000 mi = 1.609 km; 1.000 km = 0.621 mi: Concurrency terminus; Incomplete access
