= Bear Springs Creek =

Stream located in the US state of California

Coordinates: 37°55′20″N 120°04′01″W

Bear Springs Creek is a stream located in the U.S. state of California. It is located in Tuolumne County.
