= Strawberry Dam =

- Interactive map of Strawberry Dam
- Coordinates: 38°11′59″N 119°59′20″W
- Opening date: 1916; 110 years ago

Dam and spillways
- Length: 720 feet (220 m)
- Elevation at crest: 143 feet (44 m)

Reservoir
- Total capacity: 18,312 acre-feet (22,588,000 m^{3})
- Surface area: 300 acres (120 ha)

Strawberry Dam (National ID # CA00388), also known as Main Strawberry Dam, is a dam in Tuolumne County, California. The reservoir which was formed by the lake is Pinecrest Lake.

== Background ==
The rockfill masonry dam was originally constructed in 1916 by the Sierra and San Francisco Power Company, with a height of 143 feet (44 m), and a length of 720 feet (220 m) at its crest. It impounds the South Fork Stanislaus River exclusively for hydroelectric power generation, now owned and operated by Pacific Gas and Electric Company as one of the company's more than 170 dams.

== Pinecrest Lake ==
The reservoir it creates, Pinecrest Lake, has a normal water surface of 300 acres (120 ha) and has a normal capacity of 18,312 acre-feet (22,588,000 m^{3}). Recreation includes boating, fishing, camping, and winter sports.

Pinecrest Lake hosts the Pinecrest Recreation Area, part of the Stanislaus National Forest.

Pinecrest Lake was home to Camp Stephens.

=== Gallery ===
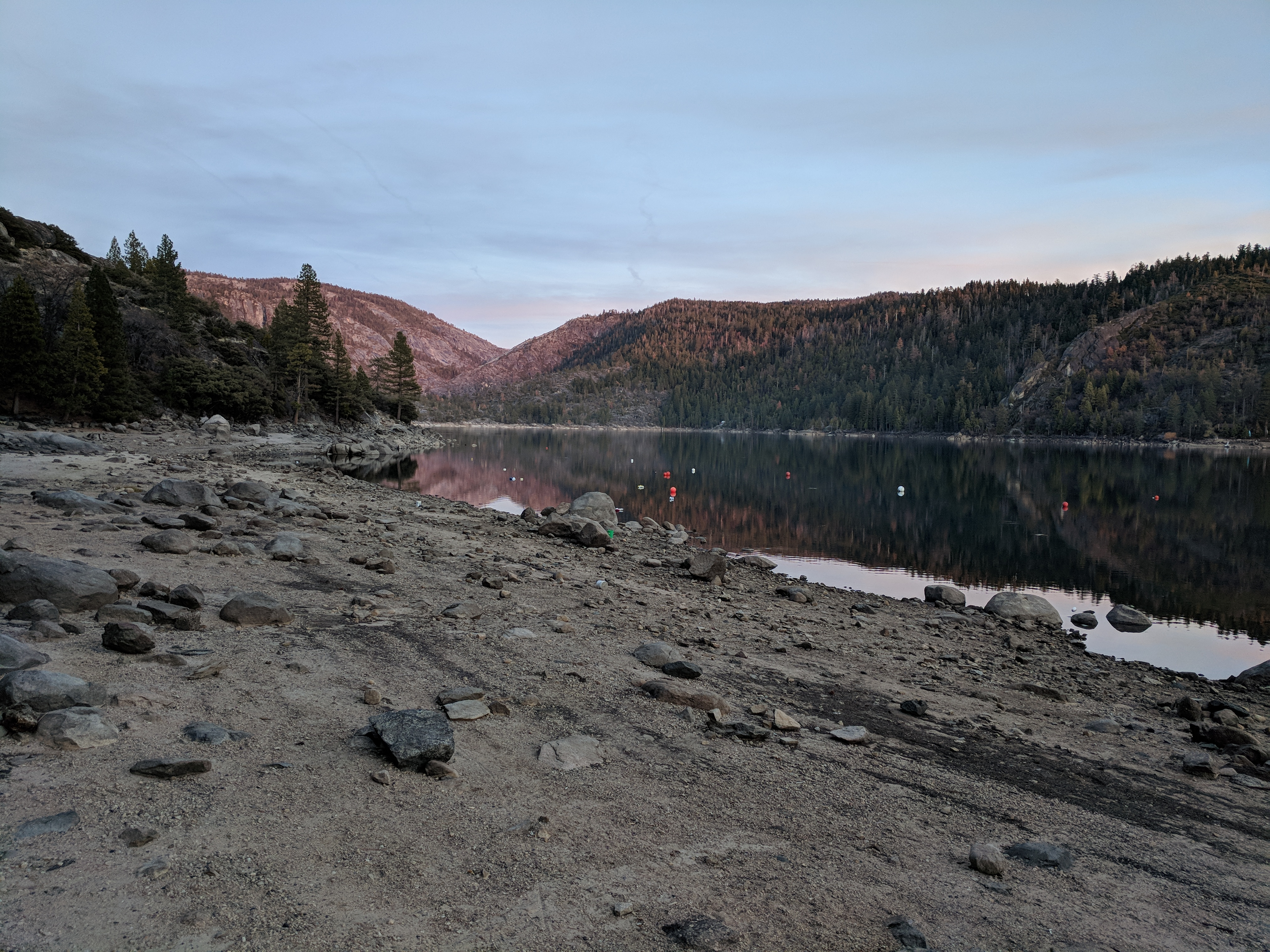

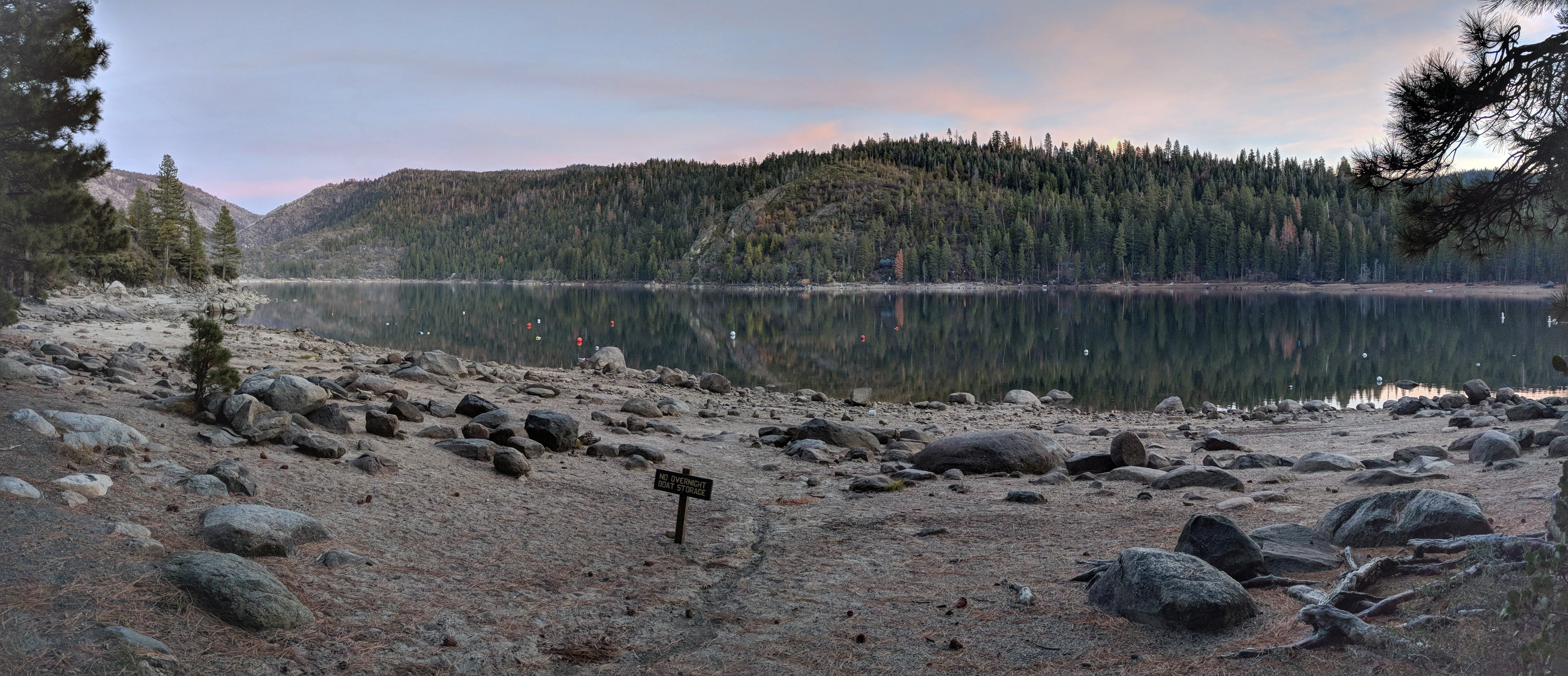

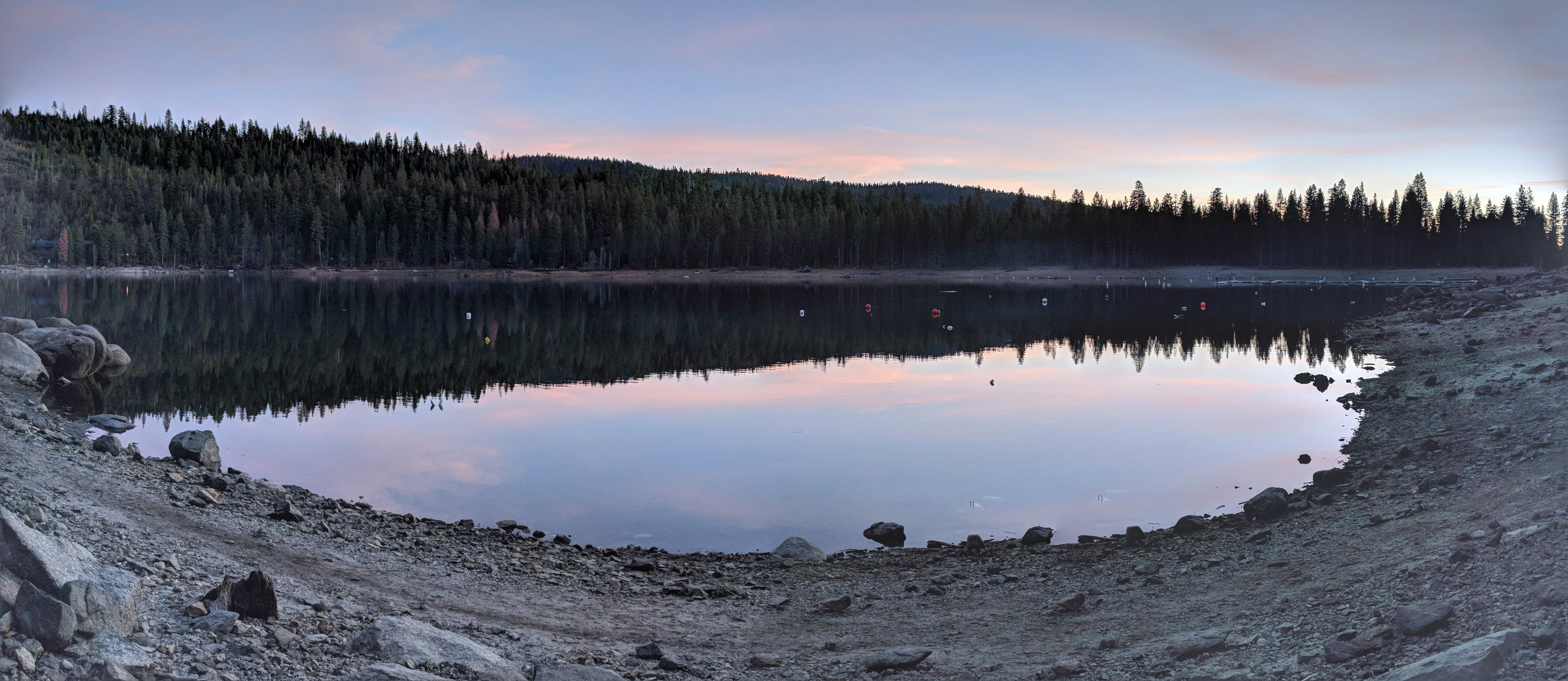
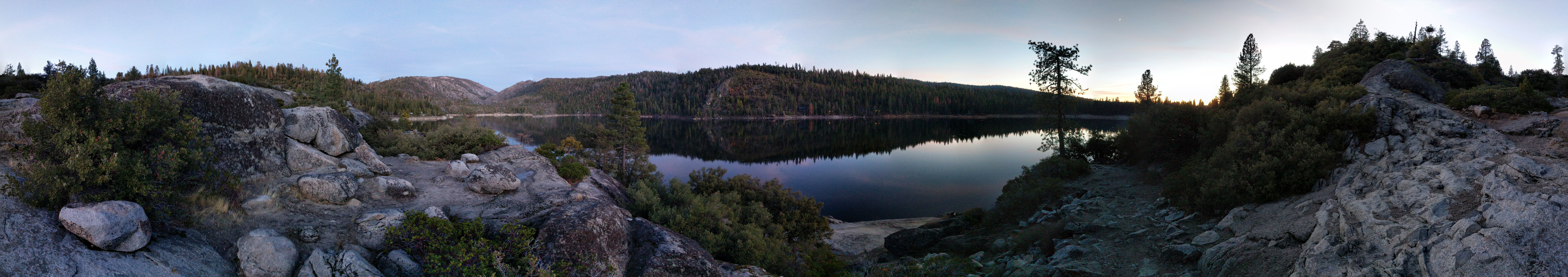

== See also ==
- List of dams and reservoirs in California
- List of lakes in California
