= Pinecrest, California =

Unincorporated community in California, United States

- Unincorporated community
- Location within California Location within the United States
- Coordinates: 38°11′19″N 119°59′27″W
- Country: United States
- State: California
- County: Tuolumne
- Elevation: 5,679 ft (1,731 m)
- Time zone: UTC-8 (Pacific (PST))
  - Summer (DST): UTC-7 (PDT)
- Area code: 209
- GNIS feature ID: 1659782

Pinecrest is an unincorporated community in the Stanislaus National Forest in Tuolumne County, California, United States. Pinecrest is located near Pinecrest Lake northeast of Mi-Wuk Village. Pinecrest Lake sits in what was once a meadow surrounded by granite outcroppings. Originally, Pinecrest Lake was called Strawberry Flat because of the wild strawberries that once grew there. In the 1960s the name was officially changed to Pinecrest. Pinecrest is a community of USFS Recreation Residences authorized by the United States Forest Service under the Occupancy Permits Act. The campground adjacent to the lake is under the white fir, cedar, and sugar pine trees.

Pinecrest Lake is the last in a series of dams constructed on the South Fork of the Stanislaus River. In the beginning the purpose was to divert water via ditches and flumes to the mining claims in and around Columbia and the foothills. Much of this aqueduct system remains intact today and is still used as a portion of the main water system for the surrounding area. A large part of the aqueduct in the forest was built with wooden flumes, builders carried portable sawmills into the forest to mill the trees into boards in order to construct the flumes. The present dam at Strawberry Dam in Pinecrest, previously called Lower Strawberry Reservoir Dam, was built by Sierra and San Francisco Power Company for hydroelectric power, the water is managed by Pacific Gas and Electric Company.

== History ==
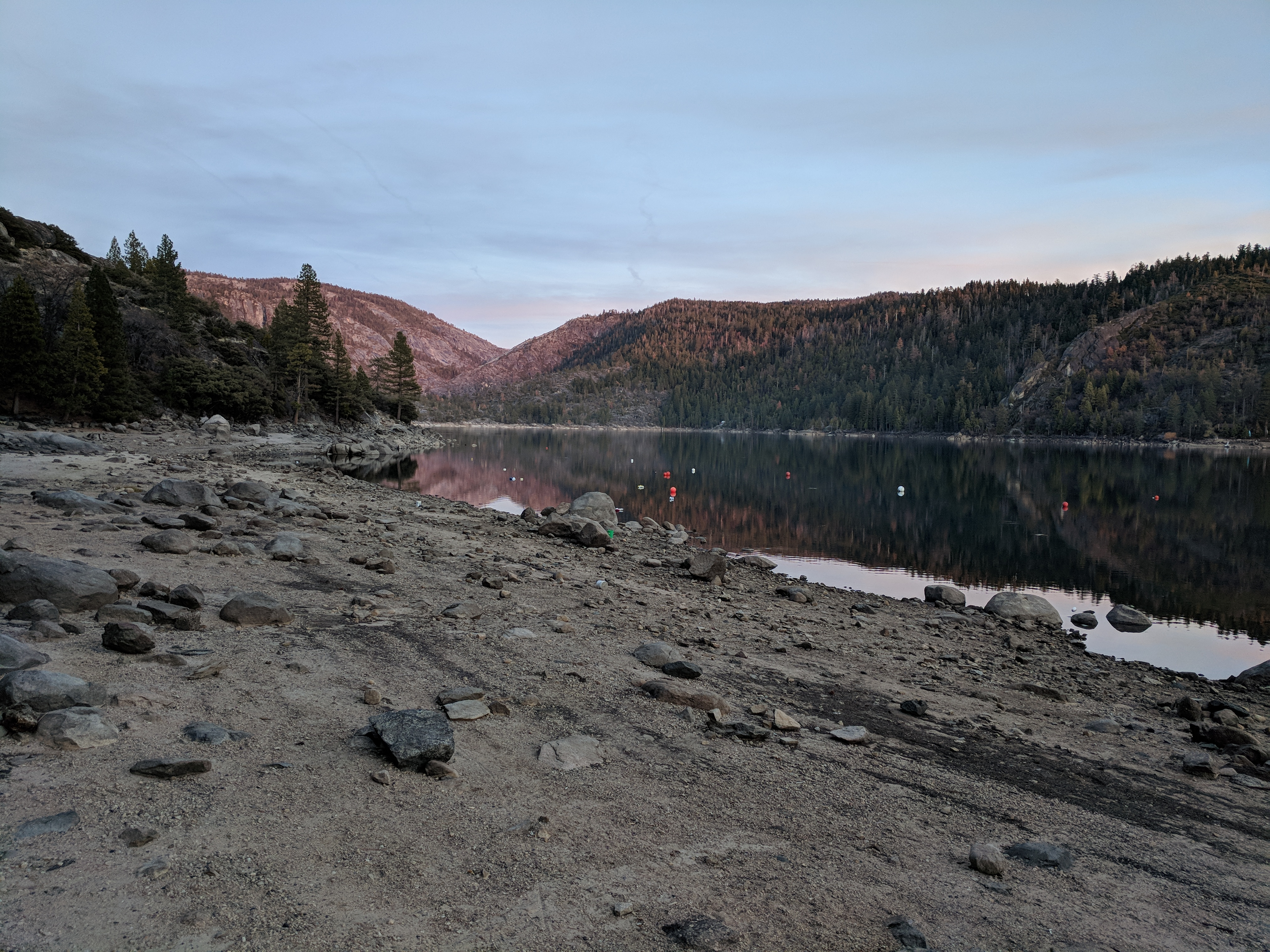
Pinecrest Lake, California

Prior to the California Gold Rush of 1848 anthropologists agree that the first inhabitants of Pinecrest were the early bands of native ME- Wuk. History shows that the area which is now Pinecrest was used by the Me-Wuk as a trading ground. Scattered throughout the forest you can still find evidence of ancient grinding rocks used by the Me-Wuk in areas assumed to be their campsites. As the Gold Rush began the Me-Wuk were treated with racism, violent displacement, and broken treaties by the early settlers; leading to the diminishing numbers of Me-Wuk. Over time miners and settlers began searching for new opportunities. Soon, logging became a major industry in the area. With logging came the development of many foothill towns. Water was vital to the survival of these towns. Many lakes, such as Pinecrest were developed in order to sell and provide water to the foothill towns.

The U.S. Forest Service's Summit Ranger District station, of the Stanislaus National Forest, is a mile from Pinecrest Lake. Pinecrest has a post office with ZIP code 95364. The post office was established in 1917 and briefly closed from 1921 to 1923.

== Geography ==
Pinecrest is located in the central Sierra Nevada mountain range at an elevation of 5679 feet. It lies 77 miles east of Modesto, (the nearest metro hub), and 165 miles east of San Francisco. Being in the Sierra Nevada, Pinecrest is located on a mountainous terrain filled with evergreens. Nearby, is the Dodge Ridge Ski Resort which brings in many people from all over Northern California during the snow season and Pinecrest Lake.

== Recreation ==
Pinecrest is home to the Lair of the Golden Bear, a family summer camp operated by the Cal Alumni Association of the University of California, Berkeley. Established in 1948 near Mount Shasta, the camp moved to Pinecrest in 1949. It consists of three camps, known as Camp Blue, Camp Gold, and Camp Oski, and hosts nearly 10,000 campers each summer. Although it was founded for Cal alumni and their families, the camp is open to all visitors.

== Climate ==
Pinecrest has a dry-summer continental climate (Köppen climate classification Dsb) that is characterized by warm, dry summers, with periodic thunderstorms, and cold, extremely snowy winters.
