= National Register of Historic Places listings in Tuolumne County, California =

Location of Tuolumne County in California

This is a list of the National Register of Historic Places listings in Tuolumne County, California.

This is intended to be a complete list of the properties and districts on the National Register of Historic Places in Tuolumne County, California, United States. Latitude and longitude coordinates are provided for many National Register properties and districts; these locations may be seen together in an online map.

There are 37 properties and districts listed on the National Register in the county, including 2 National Historic Landmarks.

This National Park Service list is complete through NPS recent listings posted September 18, 2026.

== Current listings ==
	Name on the Register	Image	Date listed	Location	City or town	Description
1	Baker Highway Maintenance Station		September 2, 2004 (#04000928)	33950 CA 108; 38°19′48″N 119°45′22″W	Strawberry	State highway maintenance housing and machinery complex, serving west of Sierra Nevada summit at Sonora Pass
2	Cady House	Cady House	February 25, 1982 (#82002281)	72 N. Norlin St. 37°59′09″N 120°23′05″W	Sonora	
3	Camp Bumblebee #1		September 24, 2026 (#100013423)	Address Restricted	Bumblebee vicinity	
4	Camp Crandall-in-the-Hole		September 24, 2026 (#100013424)	Address Restricted	Crandall vicinity	
5	Chinaman Mortar Site		June 20, 1975 (#75000492)	Address Restricted	Strawberry	
6	City Hotel	City Hotel	June 30, 1983 (#83001248)	145 S. Washington St. 37°59′01″N 120°22′51″W	Sonora	
7	Columbia Historic District	Columbia Historic District	October 15, 1966 (#66000242)	4 mi (6.4 km). northwest of Sonora on CA 49; 38°02′09″N 120°24′04″W	Sonora	
8	Cooper Cabin		January 9, 2009 (#08001314)	Emigrant Wilderness, Stanislaus National Forest; 38°14′03″N 119°49′44″W	Strawberry	Historic cow camp cabin, from 1854
9	Emporium	Emporium	February 17, 1978 (#78000817)	18180 Main St. 37°57′10″N 120°25′25″W	Jamestown	
10	Frog Creek Cabin	Frog Creek Cabin	July 18, 2014 (#14000414)	South shore of Lake Eleanor, along Frog Creek; 37°58′59″N 119°50′37″W	Yosemite National Park	1936-built cabin, used originally to support trout egg collection.
11	Gamble Building and Miner's Bean Kettle	Gamble Building and Miner's Bean Kettle	March 22, 1991 (#91000335)	17544 CA 120; 37°49′24″N 120°15′31″W	Big Oak Flat	
12	Glen Aulin High Sierra Camp	Glen Aulin High Sierra Camp	July 18, 2014 (#14000415)	At confluence of Tuolumne River and Alkali Creek; 37°54′32″N 119°25′08″W	Yosemite National Park	
13	Great Sierra Mine Historic Site	Great Sierra Mine Historic Site	May 24, 1978 (#78000382)	Southwest of Lee Vining; 37°55′39″N 119°16′05″W	Yosemite National Park	
14	Great Sierra Wagon Road	Great Sierra Wagon Road	August 25, 1978 (#78000373)	Northwest of Yosemite Valley; 37°50′32″N 119°43′20″W	Yosemite National Park	
15	Groveland Hotel	Groveland Hotel	May 6, 1994 (#94000428)	18767 Main St. (CA 120); 37°50′22″N 120°13′46″W	Groveland	
16	Hotel Charlotte	Hotel Charlotte	September 26, 1994 (#94001162)	18736 Main St. (CA 120); 37°50′21″N 120°13′49″W	Groveland	
17	Lake Vernon Snow Survey Shelter		July 18, 2014 (#14000416)	Terminus of Lake Vernon Tr. 38°01′10″N 119°42′55″W	Yosemite National Park	
18	Leighton Encampment		April 9, 2013 (#13000142)	Roughly 12 mi (19 km) southeast of Pinecrest; 38°07′33″N 119°46′47″W	Pinecrest	Also known as Yellowhammer Camp
1	May Lake High Sierra Camp		July 18, 2014 (#14000417)	Eastern shore of May Lake; 37°50′42″N 119°29′28″W	Yosemite National Park	
2	McCauley Cabin	McCauley Cabin	March 8, 1977 (#77000359)	Tuolumne Meadows; 37°52′40″N 119°22′01″W	Yosemite National Park	
3	Niagara Camp		June 6, 1975 (#75000494)	Northeast of Tuolumne in Stanislaus National Forest; 38°00′19″N 120°00′09″W	Tuolumne	
4	Parsons Memorial Lodge	Parsons Memorial Lodge	April 30, 1979 (#79000283)	Tuolumne Meadows; 37°52′42″N 119°22′00″W	Yosemite National Park	
5	Quail Site		March 10, 1975 (#75000491)	Address Restricted	Long Barn	
6	Sachse Spring Snow Survey Shelter		July 18, 2014 (#14000418)	Off Kibbie Ridge Tr. near Sachse Spring; 38°04′51″N 119°50′34″W	Yosemite National Park	
7	Sierra Railway Locomotive No. 3	Sierra Railway Locomotive No. 3	October 23, 2023 (#100009468)	10501 Reservoir Rd. (Railtown 1897 State Historic Park); 37°56′59″N 120°25′00″W	Jamestown	
8	Sierra Railway Shops Historic District	Sierra Railway Shops Historic District	July 14, 2021 (#100006719)	18115 5th Ave. 37°57′04″N 120°25′04″W	Jamestown	AKA Railtown 1897 State Historic Park
9	Soda Springs Cabin	Soda Springs Cabin	April 19, 1979 (#79000282)	Tuolumne Meadows; 37°52′44″N 119°21′56″W	Yosemite National Park	
10	Sonora Youth Center	Sonora Youth Center	October 8, 2009 (#09000807)	732 S. Barretta St. 37°58′31″N 120°22′37″W	Sonora	
11	Stanislaus Branch, California Forest and Range Experiment Station		January 15, 2009 (#08001315)	Forest Rd. 4N13B; 38°11′18″N 120°01′29″W	Strawberry	
12	Sugg House	Sugg House	September 13, 1984 (#84001210)	37 Theall St. 37°59′02″N 120°22′49″W	Sonora	
13	Tioga Pass Entrance Station	Tioga Pass Entrance Station	December 14, 1978 (#78000372)	Southwest of Lee Vining; 37°54′39″N 119°15′27″W	Yosemite National Park	
14	Tuolumne County Courthouse	Tuolumne County Courthouse	September 17, 1981 (#81000182)	41 W. Yaney Ave. 37°59′08″N 120°22′59″W	Sonora	
15	Tuolumne County Jail	Tuolumne County Jail	November 7, 1978 (#78000822)	156 W. Bradford St. 37°59′02″N 120°23′04″W	Sonora	
16	Tuolumne Meadows		November 30, 1978 (#78000371)	Southwest of Lee Vining; 37°52′17″N 119°22′20″W	Yosemite National Park	Listing is for CCC camp structures in the meadow area
17	Tuolumne Meadows High Sierra Camp	Tuolumne Meadows High Sierra Camp	July 18, 2014 (#14000419)	Along north bank of Dana Fork of Tuolumne River, east of Tuolumne Meadows; 37°52′39″N 119°19′58″W	Yosemite National Park	
18	Tuolumne Meadows Ranger Stations and Comfort Stations	Tuolumne Meadows Ranger Stations and Comfort Stations	December 18, 1978 (#78000370)	Tuolumne Meadows; 37°52′24″N 119°21′16″W	Yosemite National Park	
19	Watts & Tannahill Company Store	Watts & Tannahill Company Store	March 31, 1995 (#95000265)	18761 Main St. (CA 120); 37°50′21″N 120°13′47″W	Groveland	

== See also ==
- List of National Historic Landmarks in California
- National Register of Historic Places listings in California
- California Historical Landmarks in Tuolumne County, California
