= Dardanelles (disambiguation) =

The Dardanelles is a strait and internationally significant waterway in northwestern Turkey.

Dardanelles may also refer to:

== Geography ==
- Dardanelle, Arkansas, a city in Yell County, Arkansas, United States
- Dardanelles and Freel Roadless Areas
- Dardanelles Cone, a mountain peak in the Carson-Iceberg Wilderness on the Stanislaus National Forest

== History ==
- Treaty of the Dardanelles (1809)
- Battle of the Dardanelles (disambiguation), several battles

=== WW1 campaign ===
- Dardanelles Gun, a Turkish 15th-century siege cannon
- Dardanelles Operation (1807), an operation during Anglo-Turkish war
- Dardanelles Fortified Area Command, a, Ottoman fortified area command that was formed to defend against attacks on the Dardanelles from the Aegean Sea
- Dardanelles campaign, a campaign of the First World War that took place on the Gallipoli peninsula
  - Dardanelles Commission, an investigation into the disastrous 1915 Dardanelles Campaign
  - Dardanelles campaign medal, a French military medal bestowed for participation in the Battle of the Dardanelles

== Other ==
- Dardanelle Breckenbridge (1917-1997), American blues/jazz singer known by her stage name "Dardanelle"
- Dardanelles (band), an indie rock band from Melbourne, Australia
  - Dardanelles (EP) (2006), a self-titled debut extended play by the band
- The Dardanelles (band), a Canadian folk music group from Newfoundland and Labrador
