= Chinaman Mortar Site =

Historic site in Tuolumne County, California

- U.S. National Register of Historic Places
- California Historical Landmark
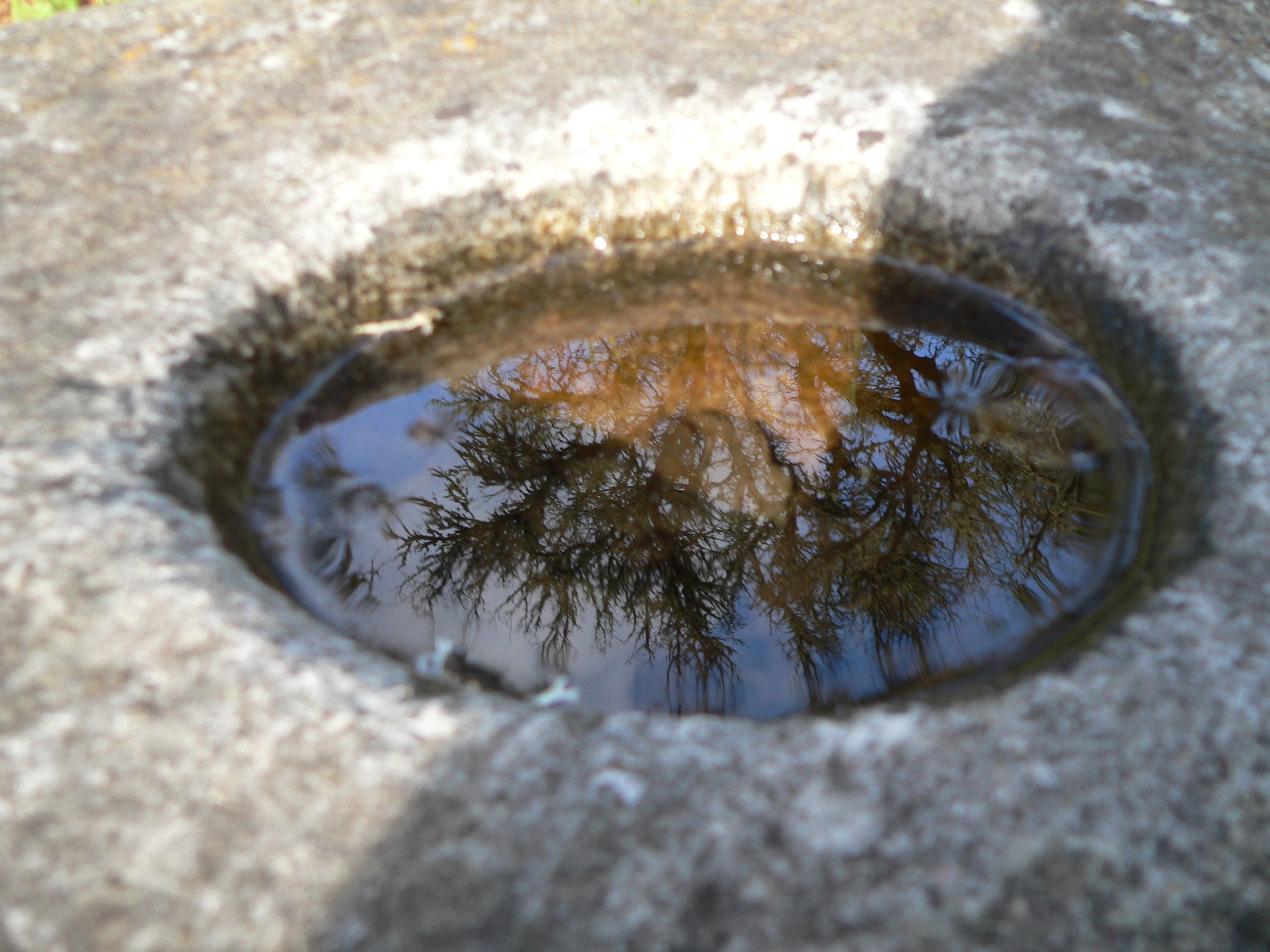
- Example of bedrock mortar at Stanislaus National Forest
- Nearest city: Strawberry, Tuolumne County, California, U.S.
- Area: 1 acre (0.40 ha)
- NRHP reference No.: 75000492
- CHISL No.: N374

Significant dates
- Added to NRHP: June 20, 1975
- Designated CHISL: June 20, 1975

The Chinaman Mortar Site is a historic site in the Stanislaus National Forest, near Strawberry, Tuolumne County, California. It was an 18th and 19th century large village site for the Central Sierra Miwok people. The area contains milling implements, many bedrock mortar cups, a chipping station, and stone artifacts related to food processing.

In 1974, the site was inspected by the Food and Drug Administration. It has been listed on the National Register of Historic Places since June 20, 1975; and listed as a California Historical Landmark since June 20, 1975.

== See also ==
- California Historical Landmarks in Tuolumne County
- National Register of Historic Places listings in Tuolumne County, California
- Indian Grinding Rock State Historic Park in Amador County, California
- Quail Site, nearby site
- Wassama Round House State Historic Park
