= Quail Site =

Historic site in Tuolumne County, California

- U.S. National Register of Historic Places
- California Historical Landmark
- Nearest city: Long Barn, Tuolumne County, California, U.S.
- Area: 3 acres (1.2 ha)
- NRHP reference No.: 75000491
- CHISL No.: N334

Significant dates
- Added to NRHP: March 10, 1975
- Designated CHISL: March 10, 1975

The Quail Site is a historic site in the Stanislaus National Forest, near Long Barn in Tuolumne County, California. It was an 18th and 19th century large food processing and gathering site for the Central Sierra Miwok people during the summer and autumn months. The area contains many bedrock mortar cups, and a chipping station.

In 1974, the site was inspected by the Food and Drug Administration. It has been listed on the National Register of Historic Places since March 10, 1975; and listed as a California Historical Landmark since March 10, 1975.

== See also ==
- Chinaman Mortar Site, a nearby site
- California Historical Landmarks in Tuolumne County
- National Register of Historic Places listings in Tuolumne County, California
