= Cooper Cabin =

- U.S. National Register of Historic Places
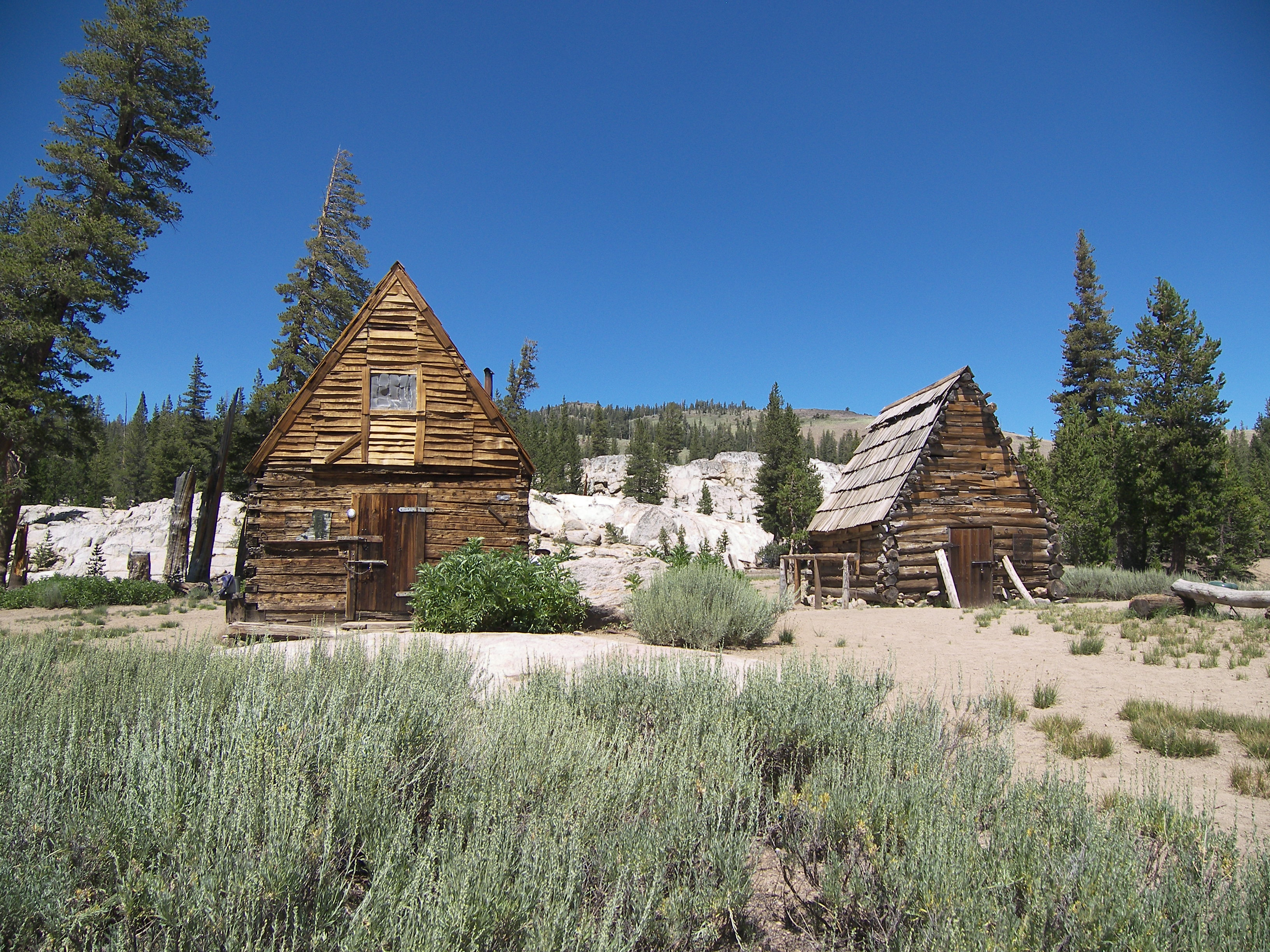
- Historic Cooper Cabins in the Emigrant Wilderness

- Location within California
- Nearest city: Strawberry, Tuolumne County, California
- Coordinates: 38.234196°N 119.828766°W
- Area: 2 acres (0.81 ha)
- Built: 1865
- Built by: W.F. Cooper
- NRHP reference No.: 08001314
- Added to NRHP: January 9, 2009

The Cooper Cabin, in Cooper Meadow in the Emigrant Wilderness in Tuolumne County, California is named after rancher William F. Cooper.

It was listed on the National Register of Historic Places in 2009. The listing included two contributing buildings (the cabin and a barn), a contributing structure, and two contributing objects on 2 acres (0.81 ha).

== History ==
The site can be noted as a Chinese heritage site in the American West. Cowboys, since at least 1882, had carved, burned or wrote their names on Cooper Cabin's wooden walls. In 1907. Claude Menendez, a young cowboy, wrote names in pencil for five Chinese co-workers, presumably after asking them to pronounce their names: Hop Kee, Yee Xahee Ching, Lee Tai Bong, Chow Juyan, Y. Wong. Since 1912 the area's grazing permit has been held by the Sanguinetti family.

It is the destination of a 3.75 mile hike from the Coyote Meadows Horse Camp in the Stanislaus National Forest. It is in the general vicinity of Strawberry, California.
