= Dardanelle =

Dardanelle may refer to:

- Dardanelle, Arkansas, a city in Yell County, Arkansas, United States
- Dardanelle, California
- Dardanelle Breckenbridge (1917–1997), American blues/jazz singer known by her stage name "Dardanelle"

== See also ==
- Dardanelles (disambiguation)
