= Dardanelles Cone =

Mountain in Carson-Iceberg Wilderness, California

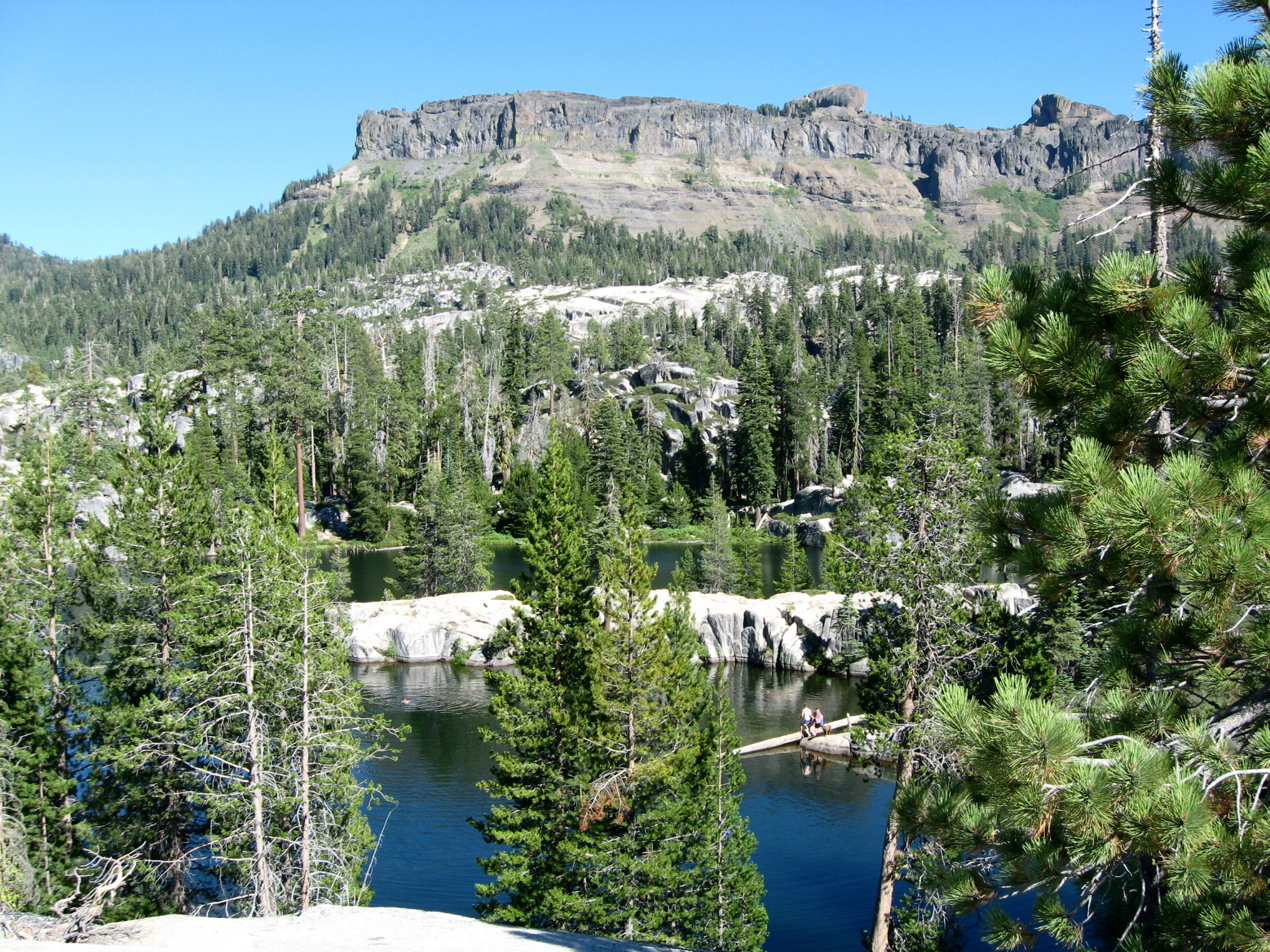
- Sword Lake and the Dardanelles Cone

Highest point
- Elevation: 9,527 ft (2,904 m) NAVD 88
- Prominence: 1,382 ft (421 m)
- Coordinates: 38°24′17″N 119°52′19″W

Geography
- Location within California
- Location: Alpine County, California, U.S.
- Parent range: Sierra Nevada
- Topo map: USGS Dardanelles Cone

Dardanelles Cone is a mountain peak in the Carson-Iceberg Wilderness on the Stanislaus National Forest. It lies near Sonora Pass in the Sierra Nevada of California. It is between State Route 4 and State Route 108.

The Dardanelles Cone consists of volcanic material dating back millions of years. It stands out in contrast to the forested and more recently arrived granite landscape around it.
