= Emporium (Jamestown, California) =

Historic building in Jamestown, California

- U.S. National Register of Historic Places
- California Historical Landmark
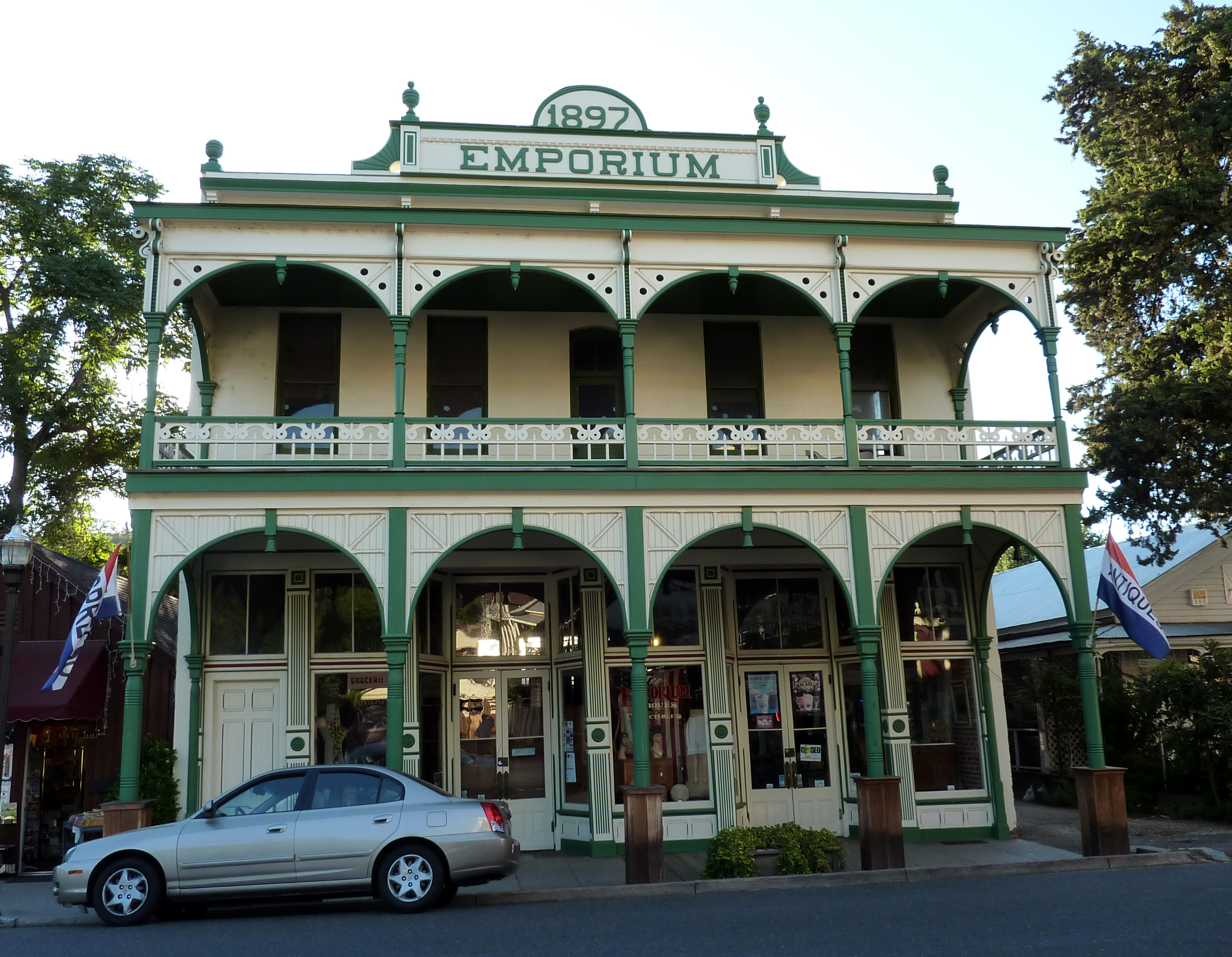

- Location within California
- Location: 735 Main Street, Jamestown, California, U.S.
- Coordinates: 37°57′10″N 120°25′22″W
- Area: 0.1 acres (0.040 ha)
- Built: 1897
- Architect: C.H. Wilson
- Architectural style: Late Victorian
- NRHP reference No.: 78000817
- CHISL No.: N558

Significant dates
- Added to NRHP: February 17, 1978
- Designated CHISL: February 17, 1978

The Emporium is a historic commercial building erected in 1897 in Jamestown, California. It was built as a department store which was short-lived, in the early 20th century served as a mercantile and telephone exchange, and from 1936 until 1967 it operated as a grocery store.

It has been listed in the National Register of Historic Places since February 17, 1978, for architecture and historical significance for the region; is also listed as a California Historical Landmark since February 17, 1978; and has a historical marker erected since 2007 by the Tuolumne County Historical Society. The building now serves as an antiques shop and cafe.

== History ==
The Emporium was built in 1897 by J.W. Witney and Sons as a department store, with the first floor serving as the main place of sales. It cost US$10,000 to build, and was designed by C.H. Wilson in a Late Victorian style. It was a pioneering department store in Tuolumne County and the region, however it only occupied the building for 6 months.

From 1898 until 1928, the building was owned by Moses Areant and operated as a mercantile and telephone exchange. Between 1906 and 1923, the Emporium building served as a telephone station for calls through the county.

It was sold to Jim Porter and Peter Barendregt who operated a grocery store from 1936 until 1967.

== See also ==
- National Register of Historic Places listings in Tuolumne County, California
- California Historical Landmarks in Tuolumne County
