= Mirror Mirror (Dardanelles album) =

Studio album by Dardanelles
- Released: September 15, 2007
- Recorded: 2007 at 001 Studio, Collingwood, Melbourne, Australia
- Genres: Indie rock, post-punk, neo-prog
- Length: 45.43
- Label: Mosquito's Tweeter / Inertia Distribution (AUS only)
- Producer: Woody Annison

Dardanelles chronology
Dardanelles (2006)	Mirror Mirror (2007)

Singles from Mirror Mirror
- 1. "Footsteps" Released: June 2007

Professional ratings
Review scores
Source	Rating
FHM	(not rated) link
Lifelounge	link
Inertia	link

Mirror Mirror is the debut album by Melbourne-based indie rock band Dardanelles released in September 2007.

== Background ==
Taking their fans by surprise, Dardanelles' debut album proved to be a departure from their guitar infused debut EP, filled with dark haunting vocals and complex electronic soundscapes. It was recorded over a 30-day period at 001 Studio in Collingwood with producer Woody Annison, who had previously worked with fellow Australian bands Red Riders and Children Collide. The mysterious atmosphere can be attributed in part to the band listening to Vangelis, particularly the Blade Runner soundtrack a great deal throughout the making of the album. Some have likened the main guitar riff to the track "Mirror Mirror" to Scott Walker's "Cossacks Are".

"Rip it Up" magazine proclaimed "Mirror Mirror" as "the finest Australian album of 2007 bar none". The single Footsteps was subsequently released via iTunes and received heavy rotation on Triple J and Sydney based FBi Radio making it the second most added track to alternative radio in Australia behind Yeah Yeah Yeahs. Melbourne’s Inpress magazine made "Mirror Mirror" their #6 Album of the year (surpassing Radiohead) with only 2 Australian albums ranked in the top 10. An extensive National tour followed in late October 2007 covering most states and territories including Hobart and the album was subsequently reissued in 2008 with a second disc featuring 8 bonus tracks.

== Track listing ==
1. "Introduction" - 3.01
2. "Alone Is Not" - 5.01
3. "Natural Selection" - 3.56
4. "Footsteps" - 3.42
5. "Mirror Mirror" - 5.09
6. "Dream Into Me" - 2.59
7. "Once And Future Child" - 3.31
8. "Cycles Repeat" - 3.24
9. "Morse Code" - 4.37
10. "Dominoes Dance" - 3.42
11. "One + One (iTunes exclusive track)" - 2.47
12. "Stop (iTunes exclusive track)" - 3.50

== Personnel ==
- Josh Quinn-Watson (vocals, keyboard, samples)
- Alex Cameron (guitar, vocals)
- James Nicolson (bass)
- Mitch McGregor (drums)
- Woody Annison (producer)

== Video clips ==
Melbourne based agency "Moop Jaw" produced a video clip for "Mirror Mirror" from the point of view of a camera rotating in the middle of a black room. It features the band performing in various formations and lighting setups with sporadic physical effects in the background. Another Melbourne based agency "Krozm" produced a subsequent video clip for "Footsteps" featuring face-painted band members projected across various objects and highly surreal imagery reminiscent of Pink Floyd's video work.

- "Mirror Mirror" video clip on YouTube
- "Footsteps" video clip on MySpace TV
