= Sugg House =

Historic house in California

- U.S. National Register of Historic Places
- California Historical Landmark
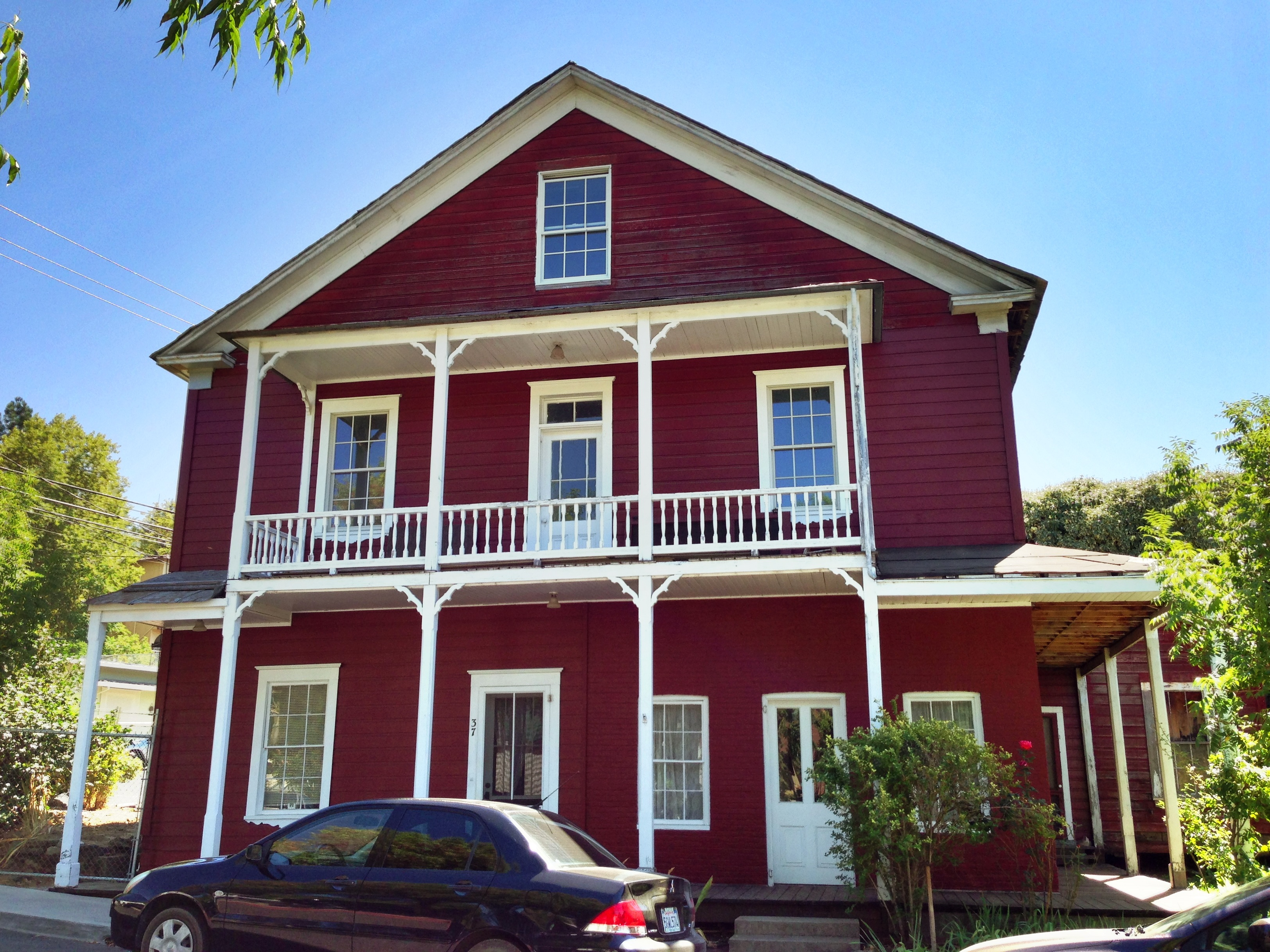

- Location within California
- Location: 37 Theall Street, Sonora, California, U.S.
- Coordinates: 37.983889°N 120.380278°W
- Area: 0.1 acres (0.040 ha)
- Built: 1857
- Architect: William Sugg
- Architectural style: Classical Revival
- NRHP reference No.: 84001210
- CHISL No.: N1307

Significant dates
- Added to NRHP: September 13, 1984
- Designated CHISL: September 13, 1984

Sugg House, also known as Sugg House Antiques, and the Sugg/McDonald House, is a historic building and former residence in Sonora, California. It was built in 1857 during the California gold rush by William Sugg, a freed Black slave. Several changes have been made to the structure in the 19th century. For 125 years the Sugg–McDonald family lived in the same house.

It has been listed on the National Register of Historic Places since September 13, 1984, for its architecture and contributions to Black history; has been a California Historical Landmark since September 13, 1984; and it contains a historical marker which was erected 2003 by E Clampus Vitus.

== Building history and architecture ==
The architecture and style of the Sugg House is similar to other homes of this region and era, and contains rambling porches, a balcony, a gable roof, and a paint job of red with white for window trim. The original structure was built in 1857 by William Sugg out of adobe brick. The adobe bricks had been made on-site. Some of the walls are 18 inches (460 mm) thick. The original building was modified within a year after the Sugg family moved in, as the family continued to increase in size, so did their home.

In the 1880s, the building added on the second floor consisting of a balcony, four bedrooms and an attic overhead, as well as two more bedrooms, and a framed kitchen was adjoined to the rear of the building.

In the late 19th-century until 1921, the building was used as a guest house for when the local hotels were too full. The building had an outhouse until 1940, when the first indoor toilet was installed.

== Sugg family ==
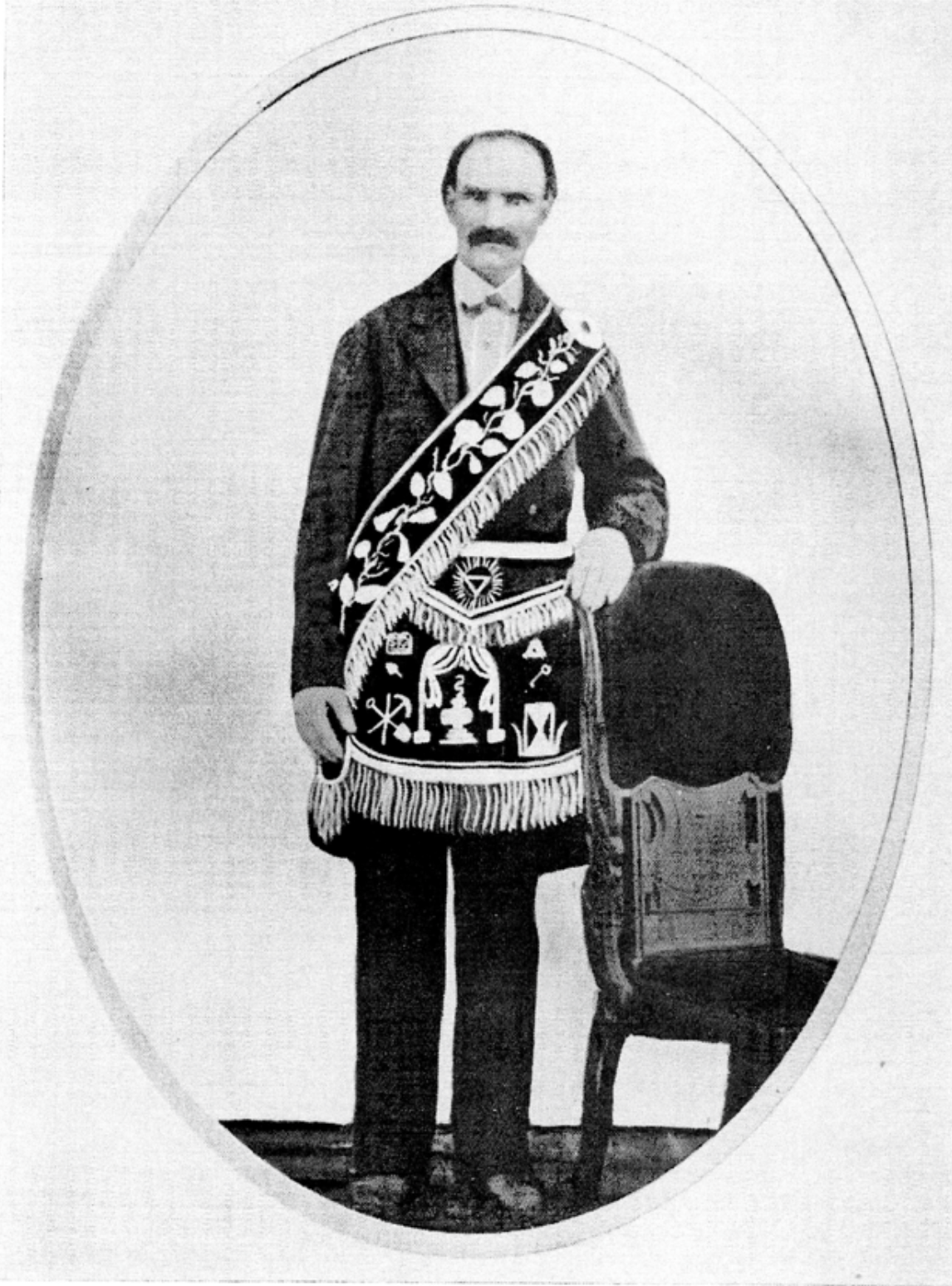
William Sugg (1828–1899)

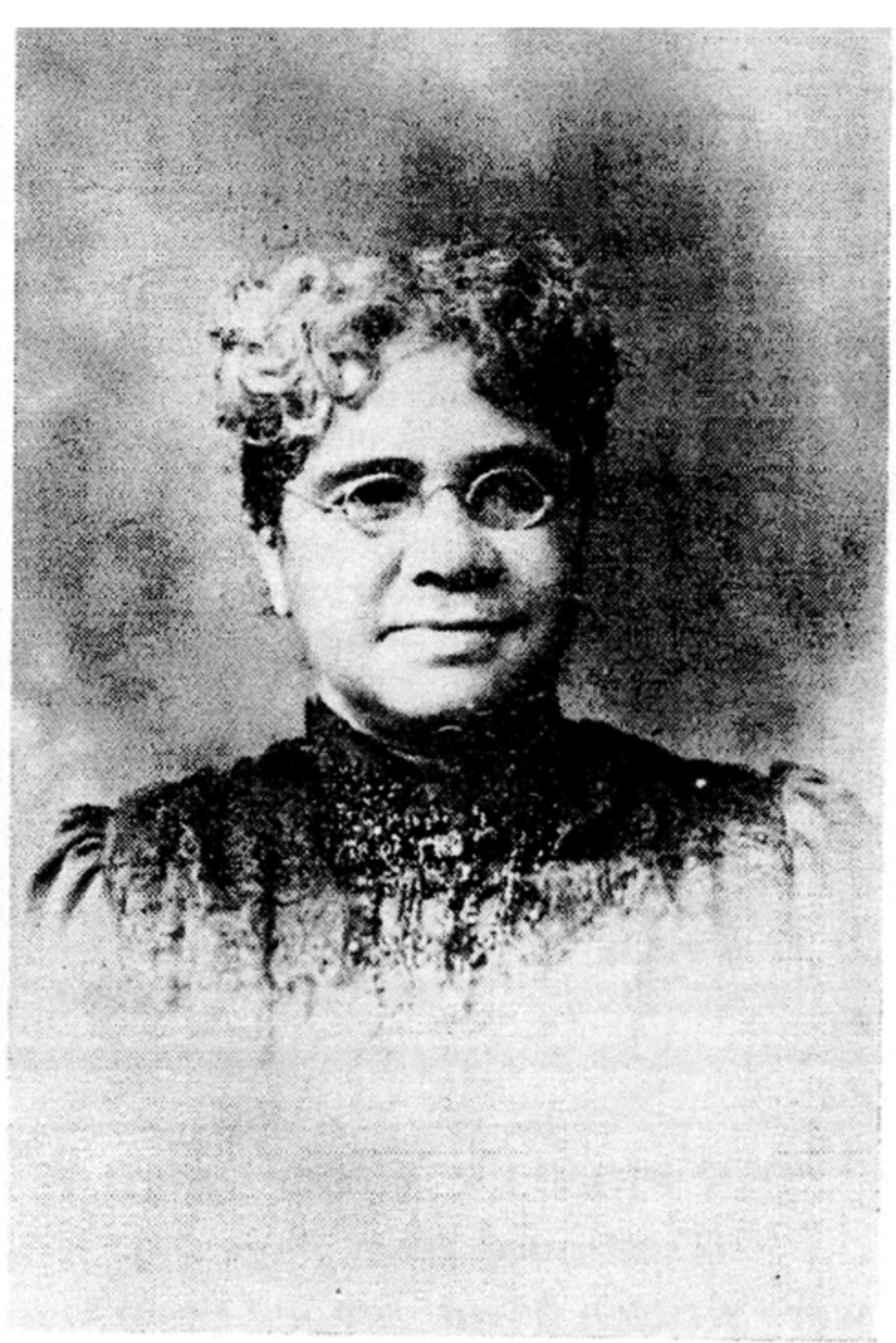
Mary Elizabeth Sugg (1839–1915)

William Sugg (sometimes Suggs; February 15, 1828 – November 7, 1899) was from Raleigh, North Carolina, and had arrived in California enslaved. He filed his manumission papers on June 21, 1854, in Tuolumne County, and the fee was paid to Francis Tate of Texas.

In 1855, he married Mary Elizabeth Snelling (February 4, 1839 – November 19, 1915) from Missouri, who had settled in Merced County. Together they had 11 children.

Their daughter Rosa Adelle Sugg married Donald William McDonald in 1876, and they lived in San Francisco. Donald William McDonald had been an active musician in the Third Baptist Church in San Francisco. Two of Rosa and Donald's children: Vernon Sugg McDonald and Earl Sugg McDonald were sent to the Sugg House in Sonora, California to live with their grandmother. Vernon Sugg McDonald died on the house in May 1982, and was the last of the family members to live there over the span of 125 years.

== Legacy ==
The Sugg and McDonald Family Papers are held at the Beinecke Rare Book and Manuscript Library at Yale University. The National Museum of African American History and Culture in Washington, D.C. holds some of the family memorabilia.

The East Bay Negro Historical Society (predecessor of the African American Museum and Library at Oakland) had an section of exhibition in 1979 dedicated to the Sugg family history.

In 2008, there was attempts to create a museum about the site by local historian Sylvia Alden Roberts, author of Mining for Freedom: a Black History Meets the California Gold Rush (2008).

== See also ==
- African Americans in California
- National Register of Historic Places listings in Tuolumne County, California
