= Tuolumne County Superior Court =

California superior court with jurisdiction over Tuolumne County

Superior Court of California, County of Tuolumne
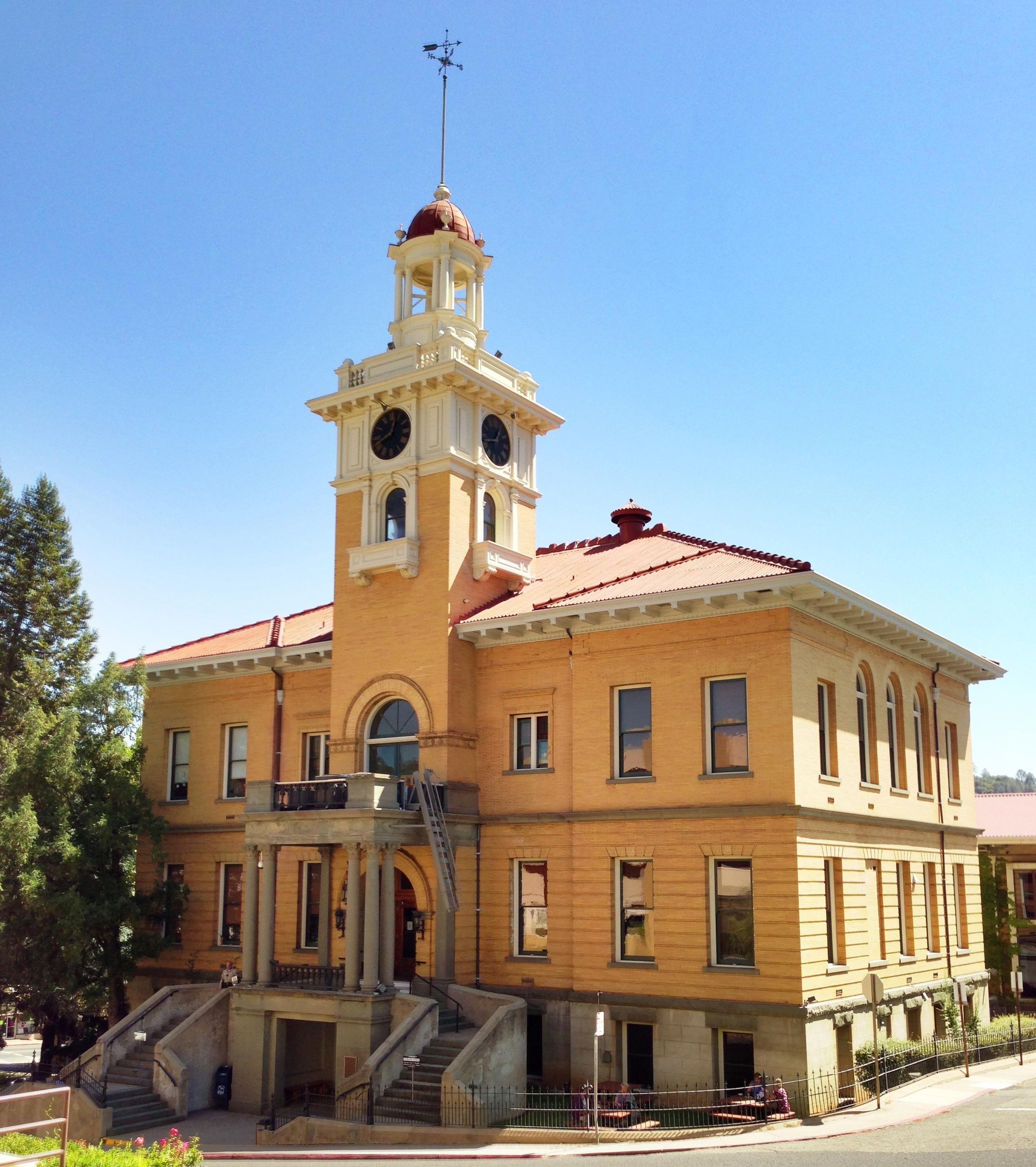
- 1900 courthouse (photographed in 2013)
- Interactive map of Superior Court of California, County of Tuolumne
- 37.986°N 120.384°W
- Established: 1850
- Jurisdiction: Tuolumne County, California
- Location: Sonora
- Coordinates: 37.986°N 120.384°W
- Appeals to: California Court of Appeal for the Fifth District
- Website: tuolumne.courts.ca.gov

Presiding Judge
- Currently: Hon. Kevin M. Seibert

Assistant Presiding Judge & Presiding Juvenile Court Judge
- Currently: Hon. Laura L. Krieg

Court Executive Officer
- Currently: Shalom Rosenfelder

- Tuolumne County Courthouse
- U.S. National Register of Historic Places
- California Historical Landmark
- Location: 41 West Yaney Ave., Sonora, Tuolumne County, California, U.S.
- Built: 1900
- Architect: William Mooser & Son
- Architectural style: Classical Revival
- NRHP reference No.: 81000182
- CHISL No.: 07000695

Significant dates
- Added to NRHP: September 17, 1981
- Designated CHISL: September 17, 1981

The Superior Court of California, County of Tuolumne, informally known as the Tuolumne County Superior Court, is the California superior court with jurisdiction over Tuolumne County.

The historic 1900's courthouse is listed on the National Register of Historic Places since September 17, 1981, under the name "Tuolumne County Courthouse"; and is also listed as a California Historical Landmark since September 17, 1981, also under the name "Tuolumne County Courthouse".

== History ==
Tuolumne County was one of the original counties formed in 1850 when California became a state.

The first courthouse was a two-story wooden building completed in 1853 at the site of the present historic courthouse, 41 West Yaney Avenue. A replacement courthouse was completed in Spring 1900, designed by the architectural firm of William Mooser and Son. Local legend states the new courthouse was originally designed to face Washington Street, but locally prominent citizen Samuel S. Bradford had the plans altered to face his house, across Yaney Avenue. The 1900 courthouse was listed on the National Register of Historic Places in 1981.

A new Tuolumne County Law and Justice Center began construction in October 2019 to consolidate the two existing locations, with completion scheduled for May 2021. Lionakis is the credited architectural firm and construction administrator; it will be built incorporating locally sourced materials.

== Venues ==
Tuolumne County Superior Court holds cases at the historic courthouse (for civil, family, probate, small claims, and juvenile cases) or the Washington Street facility (for criminal, traffic, and jury cases); both venues are close together in the county seat of Sonora, California.

== See also ==
- National Register of Historic Places listings in Tuolumne County, California
- California Historical Landmarks in Tuolumne County
