= Bumblebee, California =

Unincorporated community in California, United States

- Unincorporated community
- Location within California Location within the United States
- Coordinates: 38°13′35″N 119°59′50″W
- Country: United States
- State: California
- County: Tuolumne
- Elevation: 5,840 ft (1,780 m)
- Time zone: UTC-8 (Pacific (PST))
  - Summer (DST): UTC-7 (PDT)
- Area code: 209
- GNIS feature ID: 1658169

Bumblebee is an unincorporated community in the Stanislaus National Forest in Tuolumne County, California, United States.

Bumblebee is located on California State Route 108 in the Sierra Nevada, near Bumblebee Creek.

Bumblebee is a community of USFS Recreation Residences authorized by the United States Forest Service under the Occupancy Permits Act.
