= Groveland Hotel =

- U.S. National Register of Historic Places
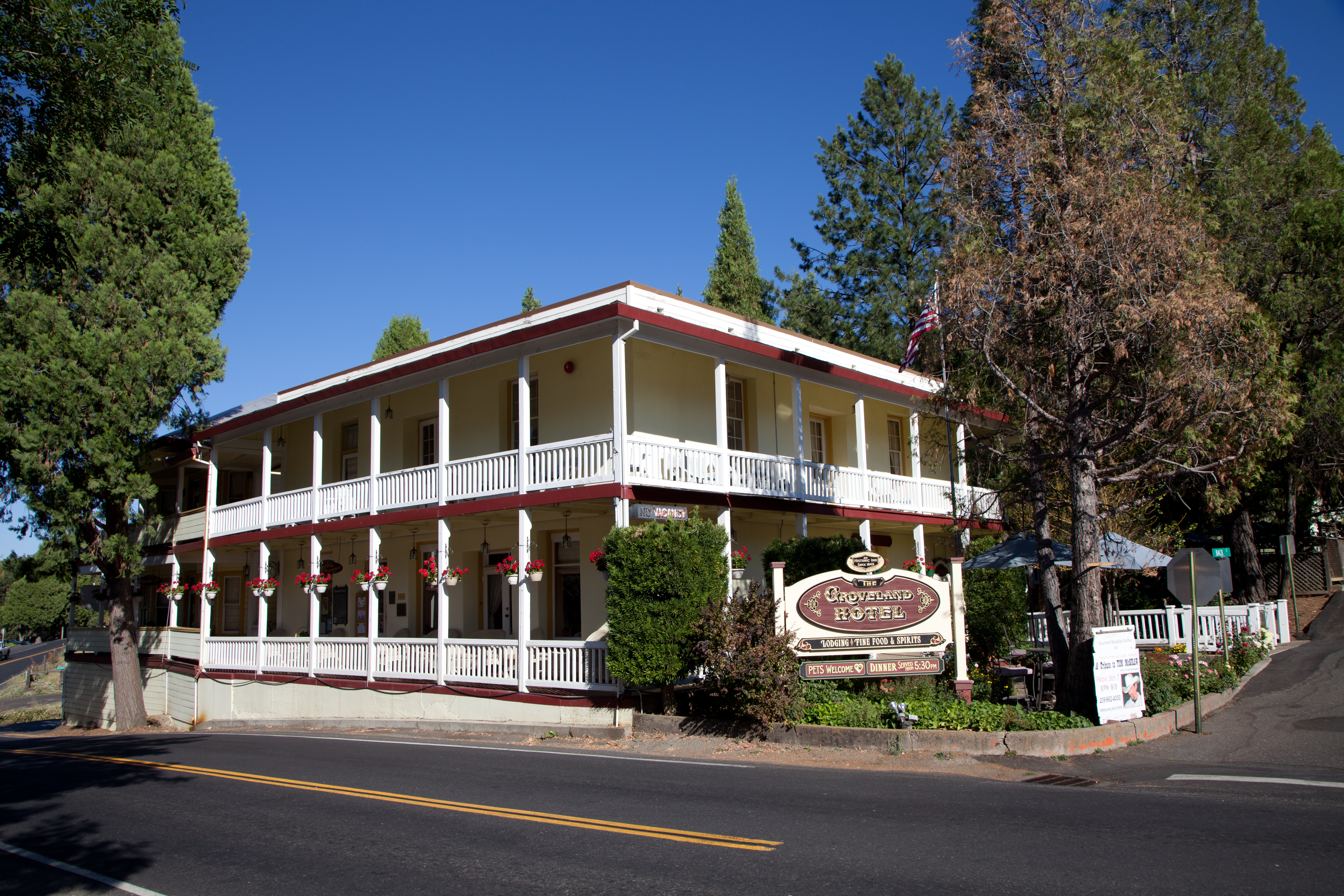

- Location within California
- Location: 18767 Main St. (CA 120), Groveland, California
- Coordinates: 37°50′22″N 120°13′42″W
- Area: less than one acre
- Built: 1850
- Built by: Scudamore, Robert
- Architect: Withered, Woodward
- Architectural style: Classical Revival, adobe commercial
- NRHP reference No.: 94000428
- Added to NRHP: May 6, 1994

The Groveland Hotel, at 18767 Main St. (CA 120) in Groveland, California, was listed on the National Register of Historic Places in 1994. It has also been known as the Garrote Hotel and as the Groveland Inn & Cafe.

== Construction ==
The Groveland Hotel was built in 1850 as a two-story 44 by 44 feet (13 m × 13 m) adobe building. In 1915, a Hotel Annex was built as a wood-frame building. The hotel annex was designed by architect Woodward Withered and constructed by builder Robert Scudamore.
