= Long Barn, California =

Long Barn
- census-designated place
- Position in California.
- Coordinates: 38°05′43″N 120°07′25″W
- Country: United States
- State: California
- County: Tuolumne

Area
  - Total: 2.889 sq mi (7.482 km^{2})
  - Land: 2.887 sq mi (7.478 km^{2})
  - Water: 0.0015 sq mi (0.004 km^{2}) 0.05%
- Elevation: 5,076 ft (1,547 m)

Population (2020)
  - Total: 162
  - Density: 56.1/sq mi (21.7/km^{2})
- Time zone: UTC-8 (Pacific (PST))
  - Summer (DST): UTC-7 (PDT)
- GNIS feature ID: 2583061

Long Barn is a census-designated place (CDP) in Tuolumne County, California, United States. The 2020 United States census reported Long Barn's population as 162.

Long Barn is located roughly 4 miles northeast of Mi-Wuk Village off State Route 108.

== History ==
It is near the Quail Site, an 18th and 19th century large food processing and gathering site for the Central Sierra Miwok people.

Long Barn was a wagon stop along the Sonora Pass during the 1800s gold rush era. Pioneers traveling west would stop at "The Long Barn" where they could refresh supplies, food and rest. There is an apple orchard that was planted next to the Long Barn so that travelers could have fresh food; the apple orchard is still there. The Long Barn was torn down in the early 1970s.

The Long Barn Lodge was built in the 1920s, which included a restaurant, rooms, bar and entertainment for vacationers in the mountains. Heralded as the Four Seasons Resort along the area called Sonora Pass Vacationland, the lodge grew to include a pool, horseback riding, ice skating, hiking and more.

The historic Long Barn Lodge, the old lodge, restaurant, game room and bar burned down in 2002, and due to lack of insurance was not rebuilt.

== Geography ==
According to the United States Census Bureau, the CDP covers an area of 2.9 square miles (7.5 km^{2}), of which 99.95% is land and 0.05% is water.

=== Climate ===
The Köppen Climate System classifies Long Barn as having a Warm-summer Mediterranean climate, abbreviated as "Csb".

== Demographics ==
Historical population
Census	Pop.	Note	%±
2010	155		—
2020	162		4.5%
U.S. Decennial Census; 1850–1870 1880-1890; 1900 1910 1920; 1930 1940 1950; 1960 1970 1980; 1990 2000 2010

Long Barn first appeared as a census designated place in the 2010 U.S. census.

=== Racial and ethnic composition ===
Long Barn CDP, California – Racial and ethnic composition Note: the US Census treats Hispanic/Latino as an ethnic category. This table excludes Latinos from the racial categories and assigns them to a separate category. Hispanics/Latinos may be of any race.
Race / Ethnicity (NH = Non-Hispanic)	Pop 2010	Pop 2020	% 2010	% 2020
White alone (NH)	137	136	88.39%	83.95%
Black or African American alone (NH)	0	0	0.00%	0.00%
Native American or Alaska Native alone (NH)	3	2	1.94%	1.23%
Asian alone (NH)	0	0	0.00%	0.00%
Native Hawaiian or Pacific Islander alone (NH)	0	0	0.00%	0.00%
Other race alone (NH)	0	0	0.00%	0.00%
Mixed race or Multiracial (NH)	2	12	1.29%	7.41%
Hispanic or Latino (any race)	13	12	8.39%	7.41%
Total	155	162	100.00%	100.00%

=== 2020 census ===
The 2020 United States census reported that Long Barn had a population of 162. The population density was 56.1 inhabitants per square mile (21.7/km^{2}). The racial makeup of Long Barn was 139 (85.8%) White, 0 (0.0%) African American, 2 (1.2%) Native American, 0 (0.0%) Asian, 0 (0.0%) Pacific Islander, 1 (0.6%) from other races, and 20 (12.3%) from two or more races. Hispanic or Latino of any race were 12 persons (7.4%).

The whole population lived in households. There were 78 households, out of which 12 (15.4%) had children under the age of 18 living in them, 35 (44.9%) were married-couple households, 2 (2.6%) were cohabiting couple households, 17 (21.8%) had a female householder with no partner present, and 24 (30.8%) had a male householder with no partner present. 31 households (39.7%) were one person, and 17 (21.8%) were one person aged 65 or older. The average household size was 2.08. There were 42 families (53.8% of all households).

The age distribution was 22 people (13.6%) under the age of 18, 4 people (2.5%) aged 18 to 24, 30 people (18.5%) aged 25 to 44, 58 people (35.8%) aged 45 to 64, and 48 people (29.6%) who were 65 years of age or older. The median age was 58.5 years. There were 77 males and 85 females.

There were 348 housing units at an average density of 120.5 units per square mile (46.5 units/km^{2}), of which 78 (22.4%) were occupied. Of these, 68 (87.2%) were owner-occupied, and 10 (12.8%) were occupied by renters.
