= Frog Creek Cabin =

- U.S. National Register of Historic Places
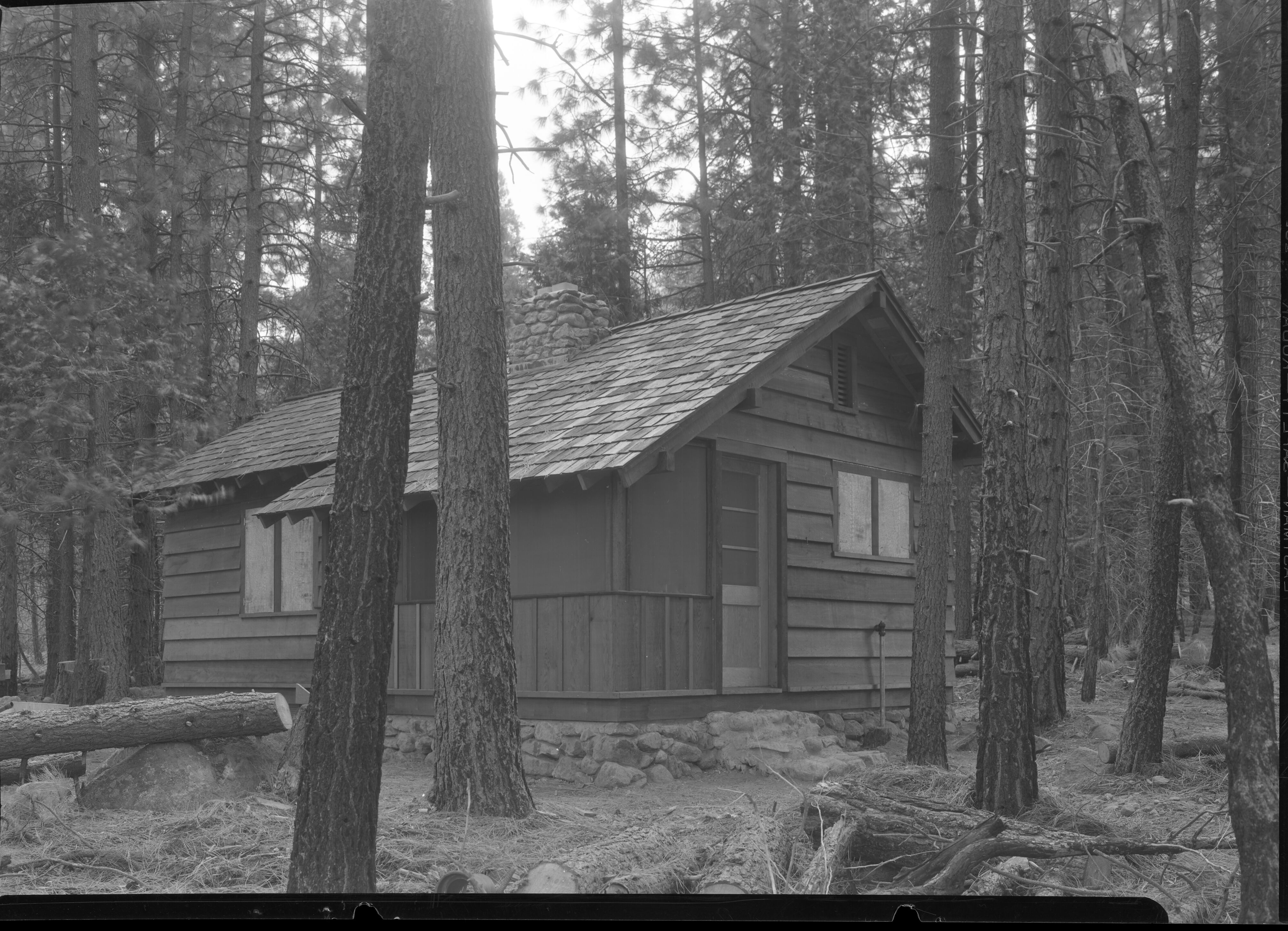
- Historical image

- Location within California
- Location: South shore Lake Eleanor, along Frog Creek, Yosemite National Park, Tuolumne County, California
- Coordinates: 37.983127°N 119.843480°W
- Area: 2.35 acres (0.95 ha)
- Built: 1936
- NRHP reference No.: 14000414
- Added to NRHP: July 18, 2014

The Frog Creek Cabin, in Yosemite National Park, was listed on the National Register of Historic Places in 2014.

It is a one-story frame cabin, about 14 by 28 feet (4.3 m × 8.5 m) in plan, with a small screened porch, about 13 by 4 feet (4.0 m × 1.2 m) extending. It is National Park Service Rustic in style.

It is located along the south shore of Lake Eleanor, along Frog Creek, in the relatively remote northeast section of Yosemite National Park.

The listing includes the cabin and also a non-contributing structure, the ruin of the 1934-built Frog Creek trout egg-collecting station, on 2.35 acres (0.95 ha).
