= Baker Highway Maintenance Station =

- U.S. National Register of Historic Places
- Location within California
- Nearest city: Strawberry, California
- Coordinates: 38.329920°N 119.756002°W
- Area: 5.8 acres (2.3 ha)
- Built: 1931
- Built by: California Dept. of Public Works; Div. of Highways
- Architectural style: Bungalow/craftsman, Wooden cabin
- NRHP reference No.: 04000928
- Added to NRHP: September 2, 2004

The Baker Highway Maintenance Station, in Tuolumne County, California near Strawberry, California, was built in 1931. It was listed on the National Register of Historic Places in 2004. The listing included 11 contributing buildings and a contributing object on 5.8 acres (2.3 ha).

It is located at 33950 California State Route 108.

It is a remote compound that housed workers and machinery who maintained the high elevation portion of the trans-Sierra, Sonora-Mono Highway, west of the Sierra Nevada crest. According to its National Register nomination, "Baker's place in the history of the development of California's highway and highway maintenance system is evidenced in three major ways: Its remote, montane, forested setting, adjacent to the highway it served; in its simple, basic materials of wood and corrugated metal; and in its site design and underlying social geography that separated work and residential areas and distanced the superintendent's from the other residential buildings."

Architect: California Department of Public Works; California Division of Highways Architecture: Bungalow/craftsman, Wooden cabin

It may also have been referred to as the Baker Station Historic District, and it has designations CA-Tou-55-0016H; P-55-006760; and FS 05-16-53-0571.

The station is now used as the High Sierra Institute of Columbia College?
