= Dardanelles (EP) =

EP by Dardanelles
- Released: 4 November 2006
- Recorded: January 2006; September 2006
- Genre: Indie rock; post punk; neo-prog
- Length: 24:43
- Label: Mosquito's Tweeter / Inertia Distribution
- Producer: Woody Annison

Dardanelles chronology
Dardanelles (2006)	Mirror Mirror (2007)

Singles from Dardanelles
- 1. "Origami Tree" Released: 2007; 2. "Of Course You Said" Released: 2007

Dardanelles is the self-titled debut extended play by the indie rock band of the same name, which was released on 4 November 2006. It was produced by Woody Annison for Mosquito's Tweeter record label.

== Background ==
Dardanelles were formed in Melbourne in 2006 by Alex Cameron on guitar, James Nicolson on bass guitar, Josh Quinn-Watson on vocals, keyboard and samples, and Ravi Sandhu on drums. They had met at a university. Following 12 months of touring to critical recognition from both fans and the music press, Dardanelles set out to record a few demos. In January 2006 they recorded three tracks.

After the group's second tour of Sydney they signed with independent label, Mosquito's Tweeter. They released a five-track self-titled extended play in November 2006. Quinn-Watson described how "the content of our songs is always cathartic – subjects which haunt or inspire us, or both." Cameron explained, "We wanted to convey the energy and intensity of the songs. In terms of musical ideas, I always find questions like this hard to answer. We listen to and draw influence from such a lot of music and culture that it’s hard to pinpoint exactly where ideas came from."

Two singles were issued from Dardanelles, "Origami Tree" and "Of Course You Said", both of which underwent the remix knife. "Origami Tree" was remixed by Melbourne electro DJ "Acid Jacks" and another Australian DJ "Riot in Belgium" remixing "Of Course You Said". The success of the EP garnered them enough funds to head back in the studio to record their debut album, Mirror Mirror, which was released in October 2007.

PBS 106.7FM's reviewer observed, "Chop guitars and S&M synth slap against a rhythm section with a disco/dirge split personality. Punk choruses snap into rave breakdowns, indie-rock instrumentals soundtrack white-rap ad-breaks."

== Track listing ==
1. "Origami Tree" - 3:54
2. "Of Course You Said" - 4:13
3. "Instinct" - 3:14
4. "Georgi Zhukov" - 4:04
5. "Origami Tree (coda)" - 10:29

== Personnel ==
- Josh Quinn-Watson – vocals, keyboard, samples
- Alex Cameron – guitar
- James Nicolson – bass
- Ravi Sandhu – drums
