= Gamble Building and Miner's Bean Kettle =

- U.S. National Register of Historic Places
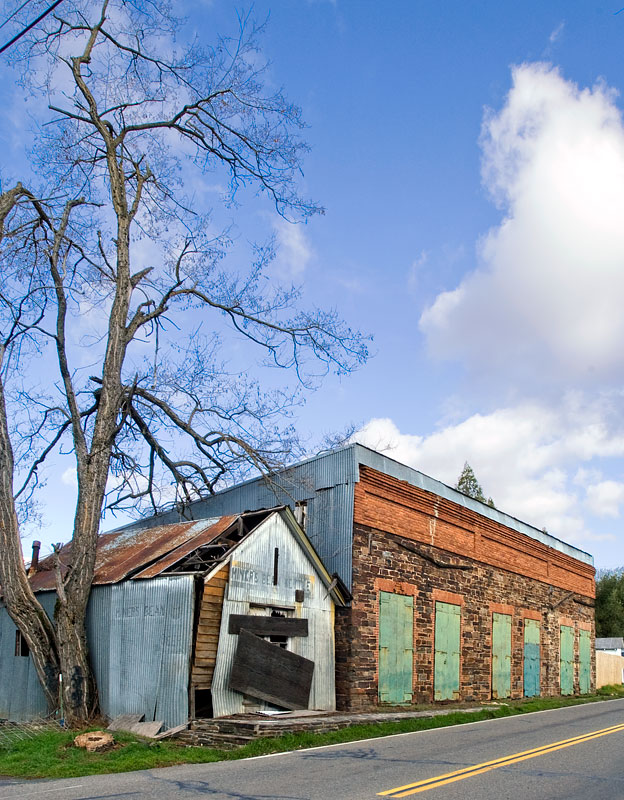

- Location within California
- Location: 17544 CA 120, Big Oak Flat, California
- Coordinates: 37°49′25″N 120°15′25″W
- Area: 0.3 acres (0.12 ha)
- Built: c.1850, c.1870
- Architectural style: Italianate
- NRHP reference No.: 91000335
- Added to NRHP: March 22, 1991

The Gamble Building and Miner's Bean Kettle in Big Oak Flat, California was listed on the National Register of Historic Places in 1991.

The listing included two contributing buildings on 0.3 acres (0.12 ha). It is located at 17544 California State Route 120.

The Gamble Building, built around 1850, is a stone structure about 64 by 56 feet (20 m × 17 m) in plan; among other uses, it was once a Wells Fargo office. A one-room jail is attached to its northwest corner.

The Miner's Bean Kettle, built around 1870, was a woodframe building attached to the south wall of the jail; it had been used as a residence, post office, and restaurant. The Bean Kettle was dismantled in 2014 by its owner, the Southern Tuolumne County Historical Society, on approval of the Tuolumne County Board of Supervisors. It had deteriorated beyond repair and was no longer safe to enter. The Society preserved the pieces of the demolished Bean Kettle for use in a reconstruction or a historical display.
