= Hotel Charlotte (Groveland-Big Oak Flat, California) =

- U.S. National Register of Historic Places
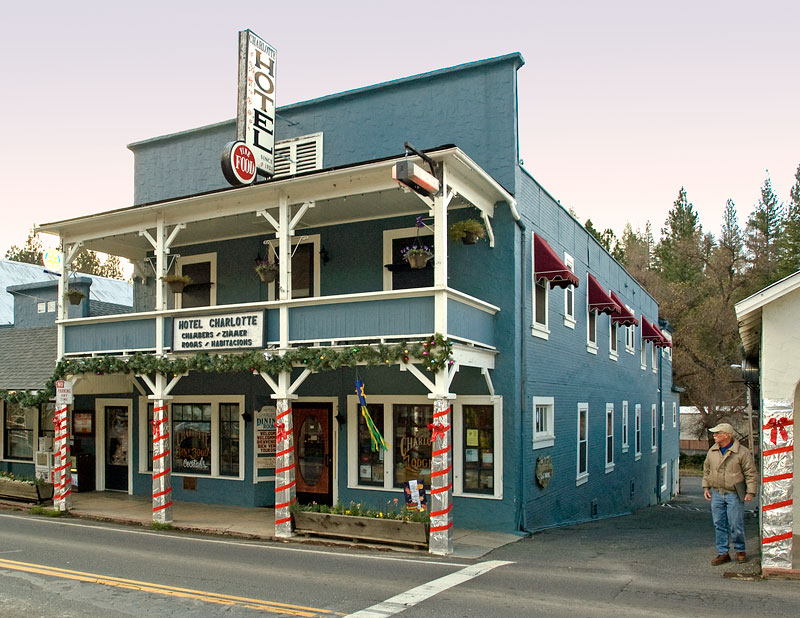

- Location within California
- Location: 18736 Main St. (CA 120), Groveland, California
- Coordinates: 37°50′21″N 120°13′45″W
- Area: 0.3 acres (0.12 ha)
- Built by: Ferretti, Frank
- Architectural style: Late 19th and 20th Century Revivals
- NRHP reference No.: 94001162
- Added to NRHP: September 26, 1994

The Hotel Charlotte, at 18736 Main St. (CA 120) in Groveland, California was listed on the National Register of Historic Places in 1994.

The listing includes the Hotel Charlotte building, originally 30 by 36 feet (9.1 m × 11.0 m) in plan plus an L-shaped rear porch, which was later enclosed and expanded. The second contributing building in the listing is the Charlotte Hotel Restaurant, a one-story wood-frame building about 20 by 41.5 feet (6.1 m × 12.6 m) in plan. Both were constructed by builder Frank Ferretti.
