= Dardanelles (band) =

Australian rock band

- Origin: Melbourne, Victoria, Australia
- Genres: Indie rock, post-punk, neo-prog
- Years active: 2006–present
- Label: Mosquito's Tweeter / Inertia Distribution (Australia only) / Miasma
- Members: Josh Quinn-Watson; Alex Cameron; Cayn Borthwick; Mitch McGregor
- Past members: James Nicholson

Dardanelles are an Australian indie rock band from Melbourne formed in early 2006. Often incorrectly labelled or billed as "The Dardanelles", they are named after the narrow strait in northwestern Turkey of the same name.

== History ==
The founding four members met during university after moving to Melbourne from Sydney, Brisbane, Adelaide and Geelong and shortly afterwards formed the band.

After streaming their first recordings online, they were signed to a Sydney-based label who co-opted the songs to form half of the debut EP of the same name, which was released in November 2006 to critical acclaim.

The EP spawned the singles "Origami Tree" and "Of Course You Said", was released later that year alongside remixes by Riot in Belgium and others.

The band's debut album Mirror Mirror was released in October 2007. Widely seen as a departure from their guitar focused debut EP, it took sections of their fanbase and the music industry alike by surprise, and aroused a passionated critical response.

It was flagged in the domestic music press as "the finest Australian album of 2007 bar none", "A seminal record", "Flat-out outstanding.... epoch-making" and "the most ambitious record of the year".

The single "Footsteps" received heavy rotation on Triple J.

The album was reissued in 2008 with a bonus disc featuring 8 tracks.

In March 2008, Mirror Mirror was shortlisted for the Australian Music Prize. Inpress music-critics poll ranked Mirror Mirror at No. 6 in its year-end list. It was one of only two Australian albums on the list.

=== Live shows ===
The quartet are renowned for their hyper-kinetic live performances, in which they frequently reinterpret, expand or combine their recorded output. Music journalists describe their live persona as "a frenetic mass of addictive and schizophrenic sonic madness". They have also played or toured with the likes of Who Made Who, The 1990s, Crystal Castles, Ratatat, The Howling Bells, The Shocking Pinks, Dappled Cities Fly, Cut Copy, and the Midnight Juggernauts.

Live festival's include "Pyramid Rock Festival", Phillip Island, Sydney's "Field Day", "The Playground Weekender", Canberra's "Trackside" and the "Essential Festival" in Melbourne and Sydney. In addition they have toured nationally, playing in all Australian capital cities and internationally at events including the "In the City Festival", Manchester.

== Musical style ==
"Dardanelles is a place of transformation. It's scarred by the past – a theatre of the Trojan and first World Wars, and the campaigns of Xerxes I and Alexander – but its ongoing physical beauty slaps mankind's lust for a longer shadow in the face. And the failure at Gallipoli, instead of remaining an open wound, is trumpeted as the birthplace of the Australian identity. Transforming sore spots into celebration is something we aim for in music. We want people to bounce to music with a dark bloodline".

— Frontman Josh Quinn on the rationale behind the band's name.

Ghostly vocals and darkly subdued interludes grafted against bursts of noise amount to a certain degree of difficulty in pinpoint the genre of Dardanelles, who blend elements of punk, electronica, dance and pop into a distinct variant of art rock. The music press have likened elements of their sound to contemporaries Liars and TV on the Radio, as well tribal-era Cure material, Can, The Creation Records stable, psychedelic 80s Northern England outfits such as The Chameleons, aspects of first-wave Detroit-tech and, frequently, to Joy Division.

The band has a demonstrated contempt for genre, with Quinn-Watson claiming "genres are quicksand, so we write songs blind to genre walls".

The band members deeply interested in groove-driven music as the basis of their song-writing, and as an anchor for their excursions into atmospherics. As guitarist Alex Cameron explains "we’ve layered the recordings with backing vocals and noise that more reflects our live show". The sheer inability to categorise their sound has resulted in frustrated music journalists resorting to inventing new genres suck as "post-crunk-nu-rave", "industrial gospel/industrial pastoral" and "neu-gaze". The band neither condone nor deny such titles.

=== Lyrics and themes ===
The subject matter of the band's lyrics is a layered and ambiguous as their haunting sonic landscape. With the EP, the lyrics tended towards shadow and dislocation, with Josh Quinn-Watson claiming "the content of our songs is always cathartic – subjects which haunt or inspire us, or both". With the EP, there was a focus on intentionally contrasting the tone of lyrics and music, a move Quinn-Watson described as akin to "subliminal advertising". They abandoned this technique with the album, where both music and lyrics shared a dreamy, Borgesian quality.

On the "Mirror Mirror" LP, the lyrics had a more surreal tinge, seemingly aimed at accumulating impressionistic detail to the sonic landscape. Childhood and dreaming are common lyrical threads, reflecting an interest in the philosophy of André Breton and others.

=== Influences ===
Despite sounding not at all like Bob Dylan, he did spark the band's initial interest in music and they draw a great deal from his chameleonic approach to his art. Other influences cited by various band members include Avant-Classical pioneers Terry Riley and John Cage, the soundtrack work of Philip Glass and Vangelis, German experimentalists Cluster, Kraftwerk, Can and Popol Vuh, Brian Eno's solo work and collaborations, Australians The Triffids, The Birthday Party, and Bob Fisher and the Renegades, and the Factory Records' production values.

== Members ==
=== Current members ===
- Josh Quinn-Watson (vocals, keyboard, loops)
- Alex Cameron (guitar, loops)
- Cayn Borthwick (bass, vocals)
- Mitch McGregor (drums)

=== Past members ===
- James Nicholson (bass)

== Discography ==
=== Albums ===
Title	Details
Mirror Mirror	Released: 2007; Label: Mosquito's Tweeter (MT007); Format: CD, digital download

=== Extended plays ===
Title	Details
Dardanelles	Released: 2006; Label: Mosquito's Tweeter (MT004); Format: CD, digital download

=== Singles ===
Year	Title	Album
2006	"Origami Tree"	Dardanelles
2006	"Of Course You Said"	Dardanelles
2006	"Footsteps"	Mirror Mirror

== Awards and nominations ==
=== Australian Music Prize ===
The Australian Music Prize (the AMP) is an annual award of $30,000 given to an Australian band or solo artist in recognition of the merit of an album released during the year of award. The commenced in 2005.

Year	Nominee / work	Award	Result
2007	Mirror Mirror	Australian Music Prize	Nominated

== See also ==
- Music of Australia
