= Sonora Pass =

Mountain pass in the Sierra Nevada in California

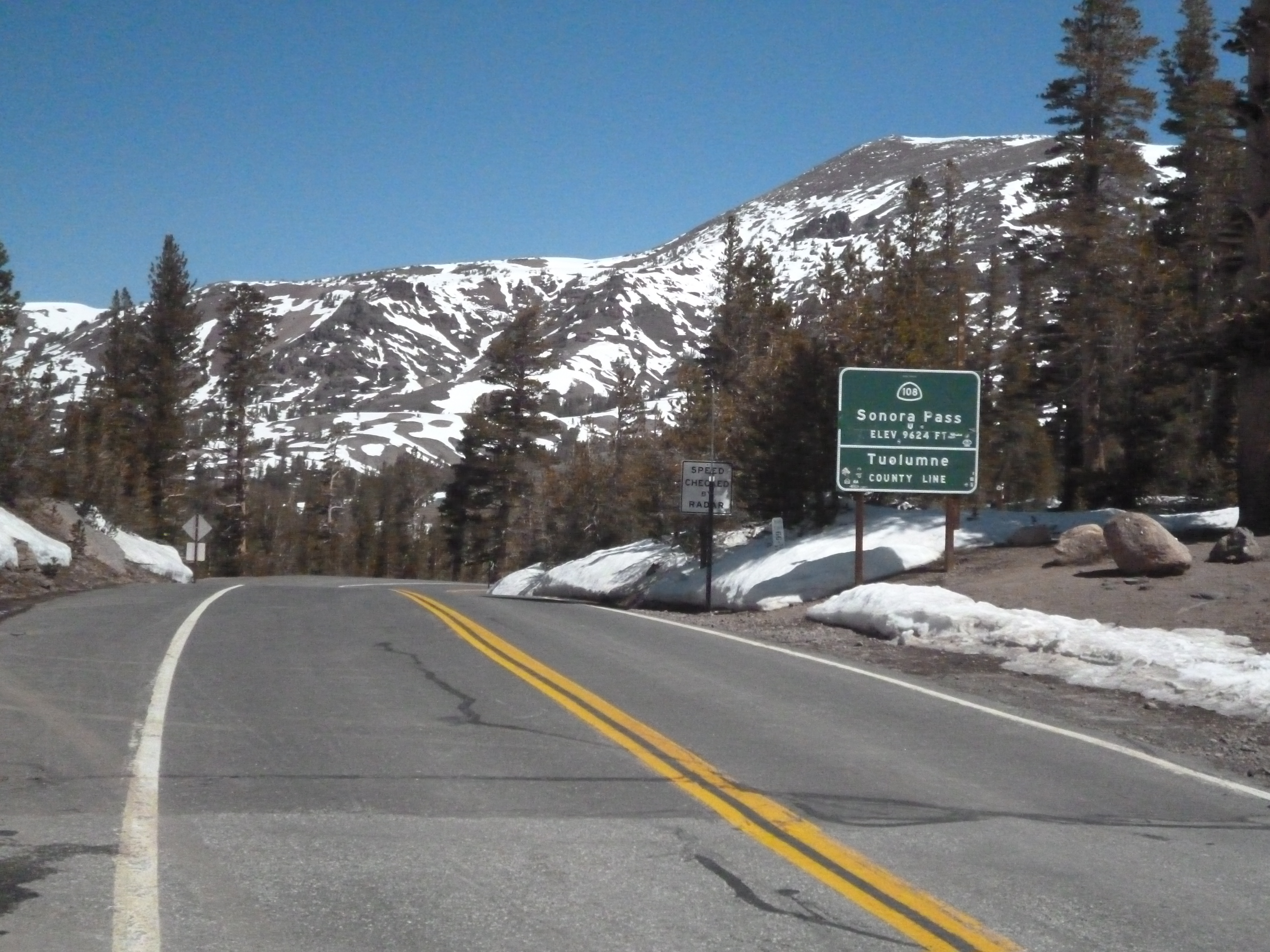

- Location within California
- Elevation: 9,624 feet (2,933 m)
- Traversed by: SR 108

Third Approach
- Location: Mono / Tuolumne / Alpine counties, California, United States
- Range: Sierra Nevada
- Coordinates: 38°19′40″N 119°38′9″W

Sonora Pass (el. 9,624 ft. / 2,933 m.) is a mountain pass in the Sierra Nevada in California. It is the second-highest pass with a road in California and in the Sierra Nevada. It is 321 feet (98 m) lower than Tioga Pass to the south. State Route 108 traverses the pass, as does the Pacific Crest Trail.

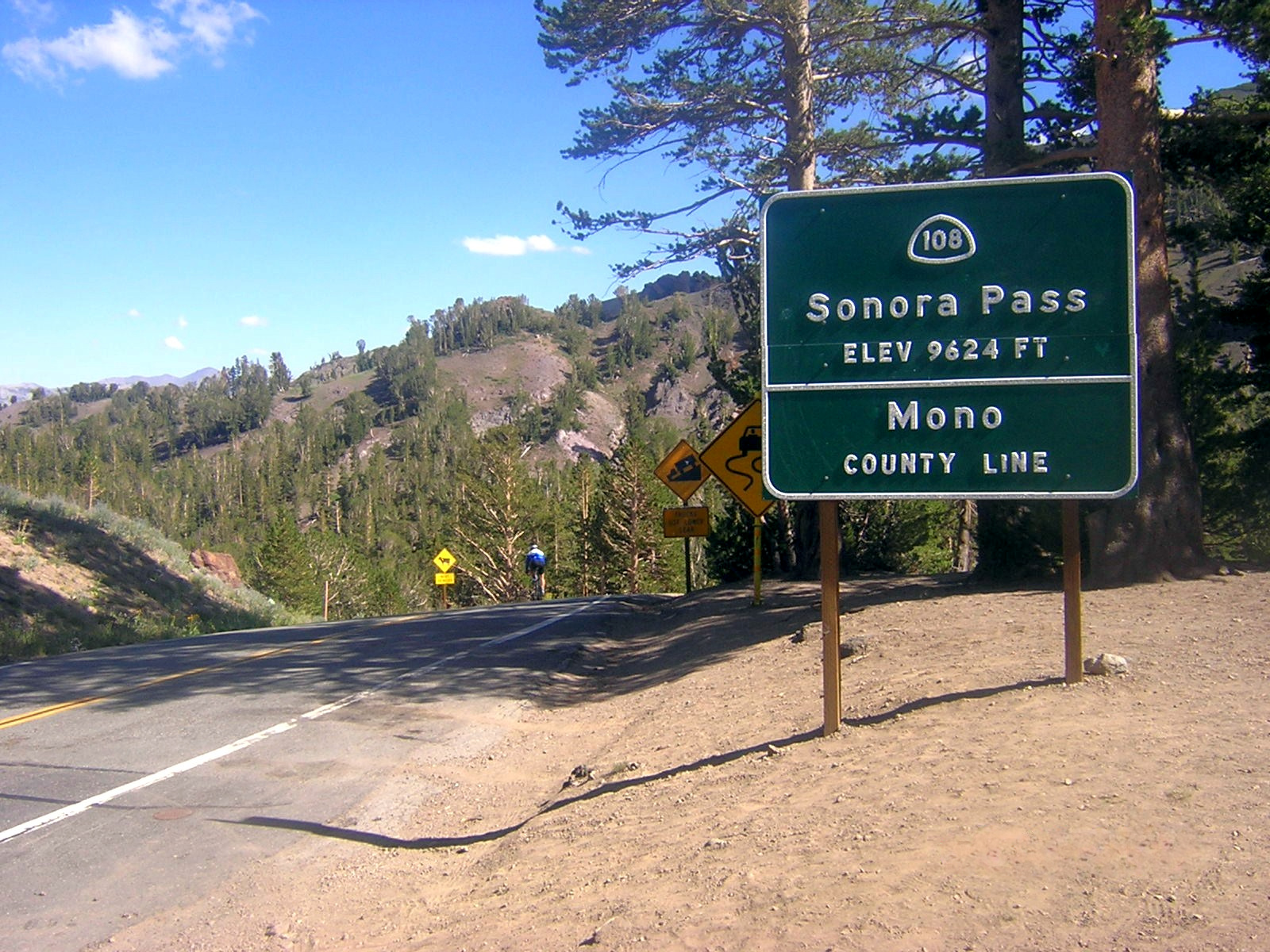
Pass sign, eastbound

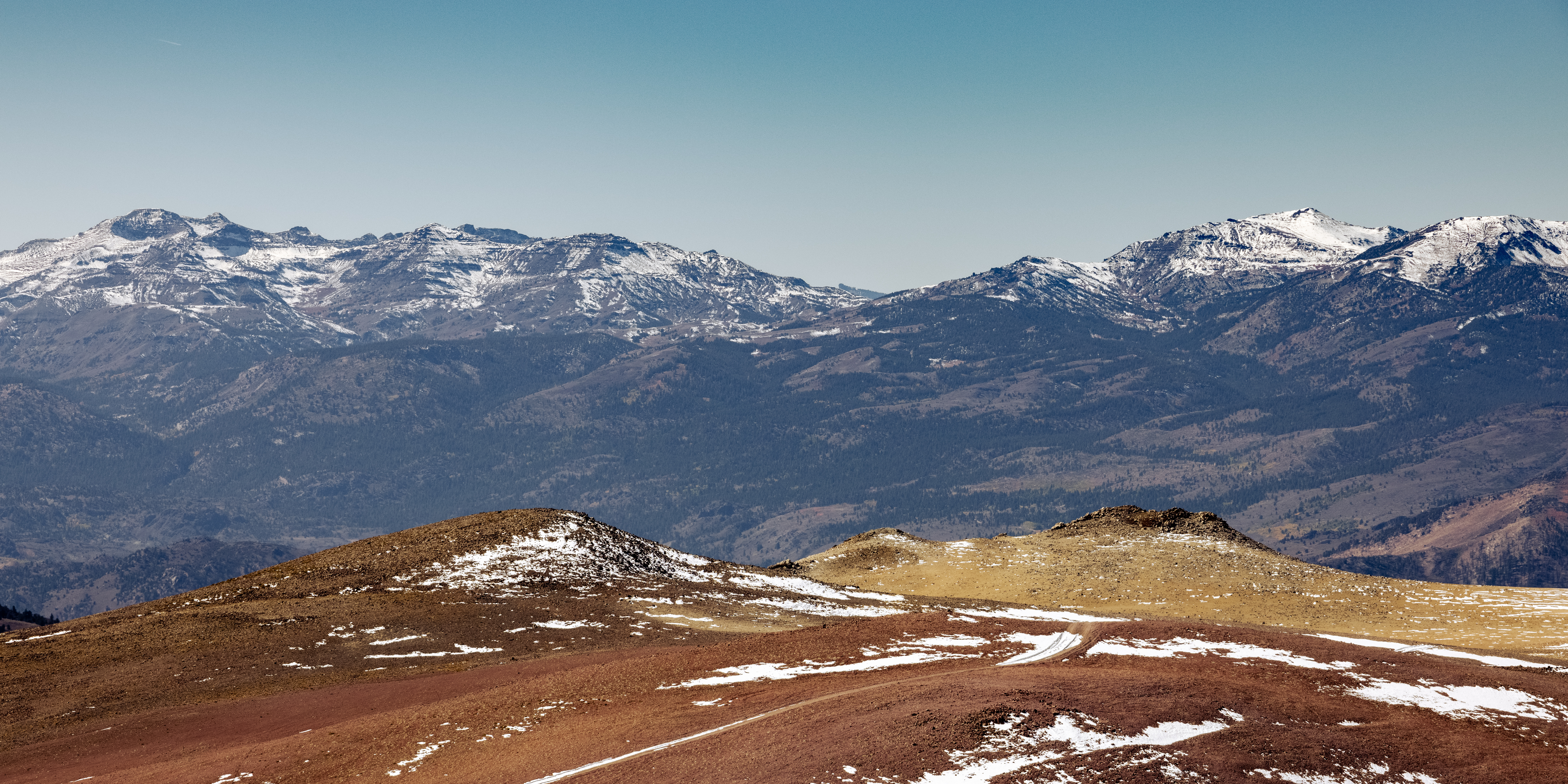
Sonora pass with fresh snow as seen from near Wheeler Peak

== Description ==
The pass connects the communities of Sonora to the west and Bridgeport to the east. Like Ebbetts Pass to the north and Tioga Pass to the south, the highway closes during winter, generally between November and May, due to snow accumulation.

The highway over the pass is extremely steep (exceeding 8% for most of the traverse, and up to 26% grades in some locations), narrow and winding between Kennedy Meadows on the west side and Leavitt Meadows on the east; unlike most Sierra Nevada road passes, the approach from the west is steep just like the eastern approach. The route is not recommended for vehicles or vehicle combinations that are unusually wide, heavy or long.

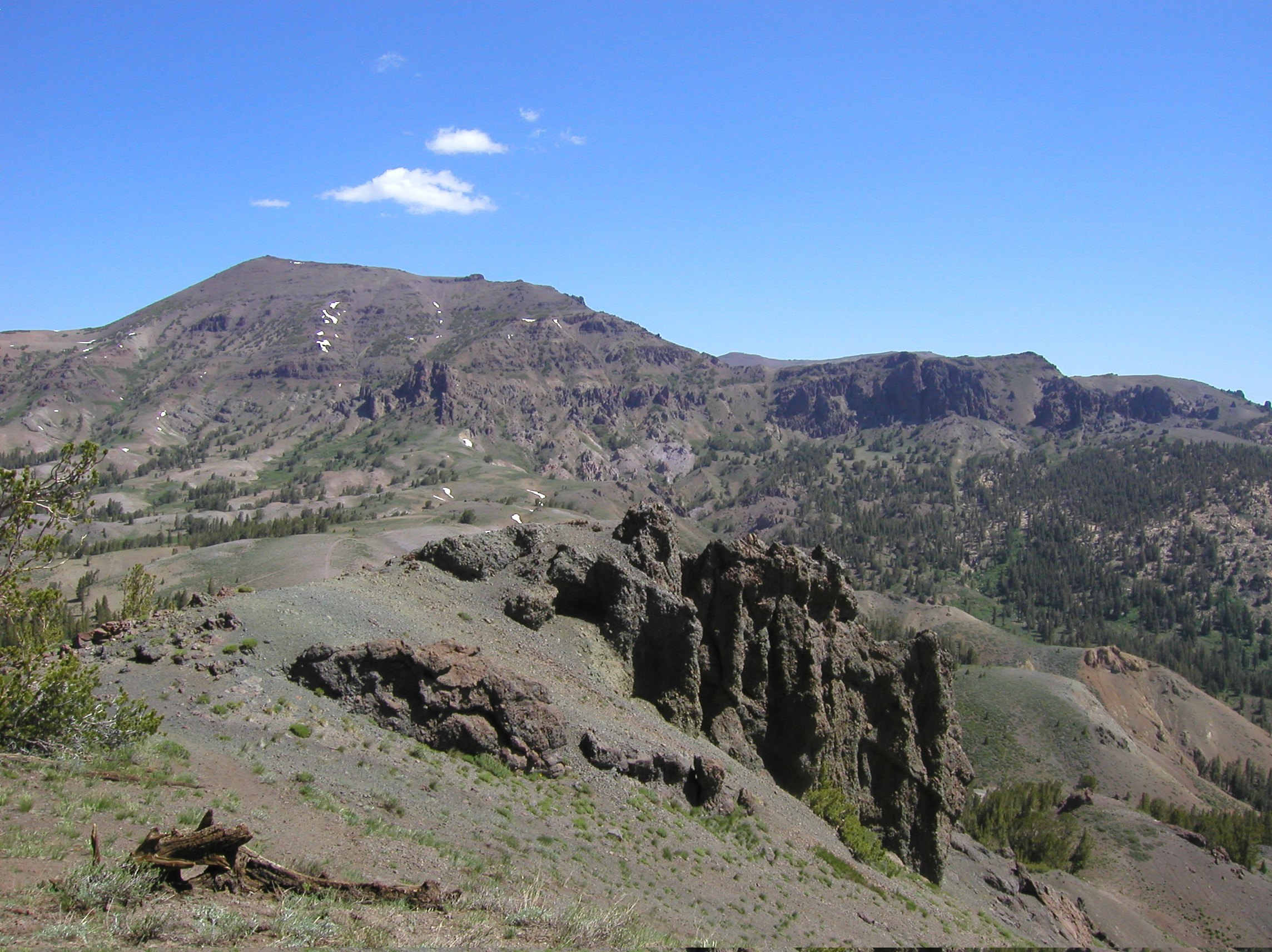
View of the Sierra Nevada range and Sonora Peak looking northward from Sonora Pass.

The Pacific Crest Trail, a 2,650 mile (4,240 km) long National Scenic Trail, crosses Highway 108 at Sonora Pass.

Adjacent to the Pass is a picnic/parking area, which serves as a day-use rest stop or a trailhead for hikes to nearby Sonora Peak, Wolf Creek Lake, and other spots north or south along the Pacific Crest Trail.

== History ==
The first documented immigrant traverse of Sonora Pass appears to have been in the late summer of 1852 by a wagon train known as the Clark-Skidmore Company. Subsequently, merchant interests in the communities of Sonora and Columbia promoted the route to California-bound immigrants, not always with happy results when immigrants discovered how difficult it was. There are some references indicating the earliest immigrant crossing was in 1841 by the Bartleson-Bidwell Party, but the U.S. Forest Service indicates they crossed north of Sonora Pass in the Carson-Iceberg area.

With the discovery of deposits and development of silver and gold mining east of the Sierra Nevada in the beginning of the 1860s, merchant interests in the counties on both sides of the pass pushed for development of a road that would enable them to improve transportation and trade. Surveying for a road through Sonora Pass began in 1863 and the road was in use by 1865.

In the 1880s the California and Nevada Railroad and its predecessor, the California and Mount Diablo Railroad, proposed to run a narrow gauge railroad over Sonora Pass with a line running from Emeryville - Stockton and then connecting with the Denver and Rio Grande Railroad in Utah. The railroad never built track beyond the San Francisco Bay Area.

The Baker Highway Maintenance Station, on 108 to the west of the summit, kept the road open during the summer; it is closed in the winter, and is listed on the National Register of Historic Places.

== In popular media ==
In 1935, MGM Art Director David Townsend was killed when the car he was riding in left the road at Sonora Pass. Lowell L. Ralph, Mrs. Lottie Mundello, and Miss Agnes McMullen survived after being thrown from the car. They were there scouting filming locations for the upcoming film Robin Hood of El Dorado (film).

In 1943, the location scenes for the mountainous hideout of the Republican Spanish guerilla band in For Whom the Bell Tolls were filmed here.

== Climate ==
According to the Köppen Climate Classification system, Sonora Pass has a warm-summer mediterranean continental climate, abbreviated "Dsb" on climate maps. The hottest temperature recorded in Sonora Pass was 90 °F (32.2 °C) on July 18, 1988, while the coldest temperature recorded was −16 °F (−26.7 °C) on February 5, 1989.

Climate data for Sonora Pass, California, 1991–2020 normals, extremes 1983–present
Month	Jan	Feb	Mar	Apr	May	Jun	Jul	Aug	Sep	Oct	Nov	Dec	Year
Record high °F (°C)	58 (14)	60 (16)	61 (16)	71 (22)	79 (26)	84 (29)	90 (32)	85 (29)	81 (27)	75 (24)	65 (18)	56 (13)	90 (32)
Mean maximum °F (°C)	51.3 (10.7)	50.7 (10.4)	54.6 (12.6)	60.3 (15.7)	66.9 (19.4)	75.4 (24.1)	79.9 (26.6)	77.8 (25.4)	73.4 (23.0)	66.9 (19.4)	57.6 (14.2)	50.1 (10.1)	80.5 (26.9)
Mean daily maximum °F (°C)	37.1 (2.8)	36.7 (2.6)	41.2 (5.1)	45.7 (7.6)	53.5 (11.9)	63.5 (17.5)	71.6 (22.0)	70.5 (21.4)	63.5 (17.5)	53.1 (11.7)	43.0 (6.1)	36.3 (2.4)	51.3 (10.7)
Daily mean °F (°C)	28.3 (−2.1)	27.5 (−2.5)	31.0 (−0.6)	34.9 (1.6)	42.4 (5.8)	51.1 (10.6)	58.7 (14.8)	57.8 (14.3)	51.5 (10.8)	42.3 (5.7)	33.7 (0.9)	27.7 (−2.4)	40.6 (4.7)
Mean daily minimum °F (°C)	19.5 (−6.9)	18.2 (−7.7)	20.9 (−6.2)	24.1 (−4.4)	31.2 (−0.4)	38.5 (3.6)	45.7 (7.6)	45.0 (7.2)	39.6 (4.2)	31.5 (−0.3)	24.3 (−4.3)	19.1 (−7.2)	29.8 (−1.2)
Mean minimum °F (°C)	1.2 (−17.1)	1.8 (−16.8)	5.2 (−14.9)	8.6 (−13.0)	18.0 (−7.8)	25.5 (−3.6)	35.8 (2.1)	35.9 (2.2)	27.0 (−2.8)	16.4 (−8.7)	6.1 (−14.4)	1.0 (−17.2)	−4.0 (−20.0)
Record low °F (°C)	−14 (−26)	−16 (−27)	−5 (−21)	−3 (−19)	5 (−15)	14 (−10)	23 (−5)	26 (−3)	19 (−7)	5 (−15)	−4 (−20)	−12 (−24)	−16 (−27)
Average precipitation inches (mm)	6.44 (164)	5.72 (145)	5.49 (139)	3.00 (76)	1.77 (45)	0.67 (17)	0.77 (20)	0.51 (13)	0.70 (18)	1.94 (49)	3.34 (85)	5.73 (146)	36.08 (917)
Average extreme snow depth inches (cm)	54.2 (138)	66.9 (170)	79.0 (201)	70.2 (178)	44.4 (113)	11.5 (29)	0.0 (0.0)	0.0 (0.0)	0.4 (1.0)	3.1 (7.9)	16.5 (42)	35.5 (90)	83.2 (211)
Average precipitation days (≥ 0.01 in)	10.3	11.0	12.0	10.1	6.7	3.1	2.3	2.4	3.2	4.7	8.0	10.2	84
Source: National Weather Service (snow depth 2006–2020)
