= Strawberry, Tuolumne County, California =

Unincorporated community in California, United States

Strawberry
- Census-designated place
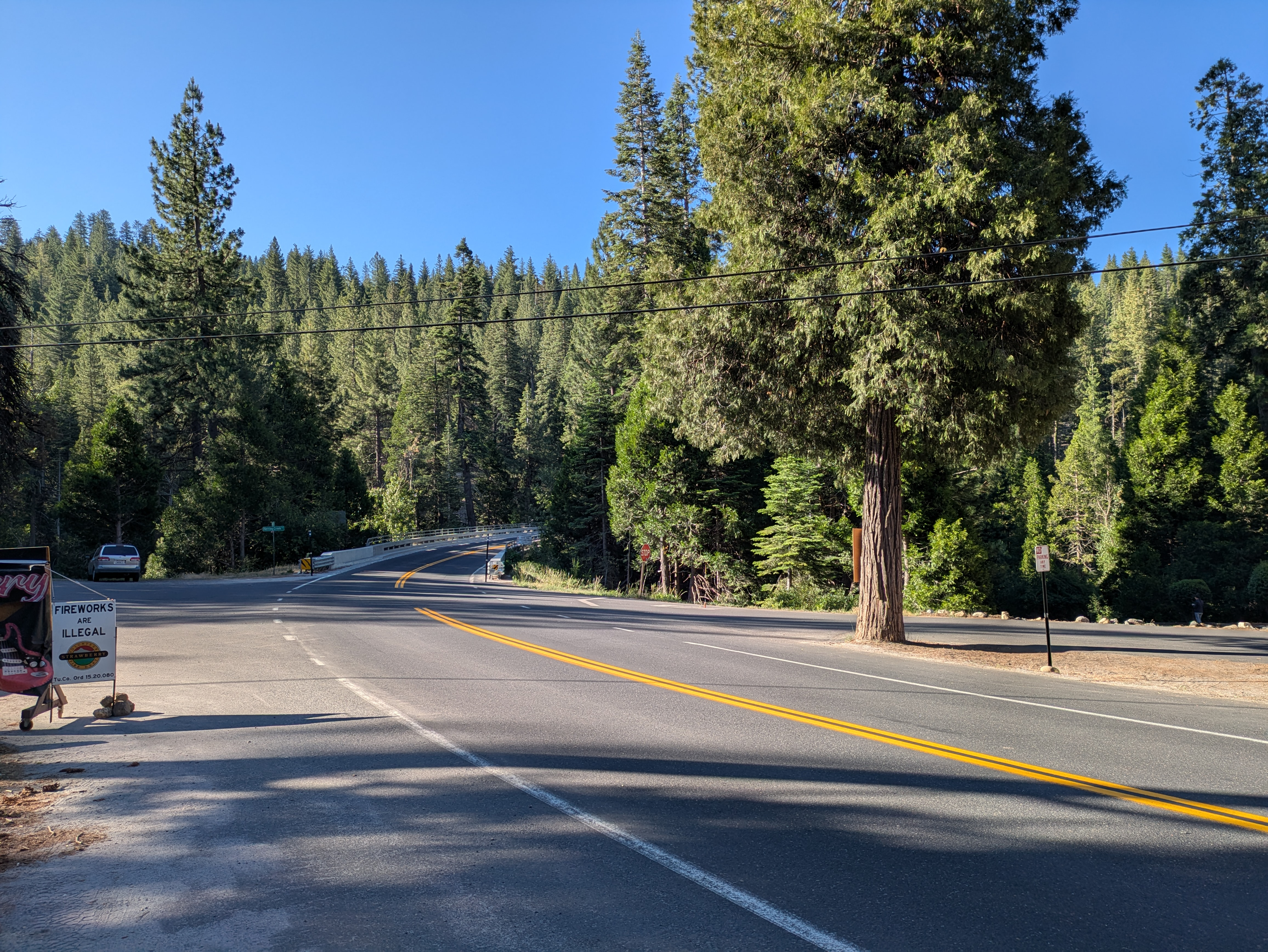
- California State Route 108 in Strawberry

- Position in California.
- Coordinates: 38°11′54″N 120°00′34″W
- Country: United States
- State: California
- County: Tuolumne

Area
  - Total: 0.530 sq mi (1.372 km^{2})
  - Land: 0.522 sq mi (1.351 km^{2})
  - Water: 0.0081 sq mi (0.021 km^{2}) 1.56%
- Elevation: 5,325 ft (1,623 m)

Population (2020)
  - Total: 87
  - Density: 170/sq mi (64/km^{2})
- Time zone: UTC-8 (Pacific (PST))
  - Summer (DST): UTC-7 (PDT)
- ZIP Code: 95375
- Area code: 209
- GNIS feature IDs: 1659884; 2628792

Strawberry is an unincorporated community and a census-designated place (CDP) in Tuolumne County, California, United States. Strawberry is located on California State Route 108 10 miles (16 km) northeast of Long Barn. Strawberry had a post office with ZIP code 95375, which opened in 1949, which is now closed. Strawberry sits at an elevation of 5,325 feet (1,623 m). The 2020 United States census reported Strawberry's population was 87.

== Geography ==
According to the United States Census Bureau, the CDP covers an area of 0.5 square mile (1.4 km^{2}), of which 98.44% is land and 1.56% is water.

== Demographics ==
Historical population
| Census | Pop. | Note | %± |
|---|---|---|---|
| 2010 | 86 | | — |
| 2020 | 87 | | 1.2% |
U.S. Decennial Census; 1850–1870 1880–1890; 1900 1910 1920; 1930 1940 1950; 1960 1970 1980; 1990 2000 2010

Strawberry first appeared as a census designated place in the 2010 U.S. census.

=== Racial and ethnic composition ===
Strawberry CDP, Tuolumne County, California – Racial and ethnic composition Note: the US Census treats Hispanic/Latino as an ethnic category. This table excludes Latinos from the racial categories and assigns them to a separate category. Hispanics/Latinos may be of any race.
| Race / Ethnicity (NH = Non-Hispanic) | Pop 2010 | Pop 2020 | % 2010 | % 2020 |
|---|---|---|---|---|
| White alone (NH) | 79 | 80 | 91.86% | 91.95% |
| Black or African American alone (NH) | 0 | 0 | 0.00% | 0.00% |
| Native American or Alaska Native alone (NH) | 0 | 1 | 0.00% | 1.15% |
| Asian alone (NH) | 0 | 0 | 0.00% | 0.00% |
| Native Hawaiian or Pacific Islander alone (NH) | 0 | 0 | 0.00% | 0.00% |
| Other race alone (NH) | 0 | 0 | 0.00% | 0.00% |
| Mixed race or Multiracial (NH) | 0 | 5 | 0.00% | 5.75% |
| Hispanic or Latino (any race) | 7 | 1 | 8.14% | 1.15% |
| Total | 86 | 87 | 100.00% | 100.00% |

=== 2020 census ===
The 2020 United States census reported that Strawberry had a population of 87. The population density was 167.0 inhabitants per square mile (64.5/km^{2}). The racial makeup of Strawberry was 80 (92%) White, 1 (1%) Native American, 1 (1%) Asian, and 5 (6%) from two or more races. Hispanic or Latino of any race were 1 person (1%).

There were 47 households, and the average household size was 1.85. There were 26 families (55% of all households). The median age was 63.4 years.

There were 283 housing units at an average density of 543.2 units per square mile (209.7 units/km^{2}), of which 47 (17%) were occupied and 231 (82%) were used seasonally. Of the occupied units, 27 (57%) were owner-occupied, and 20 (43%) were occupied by renters.

== Gallery ==
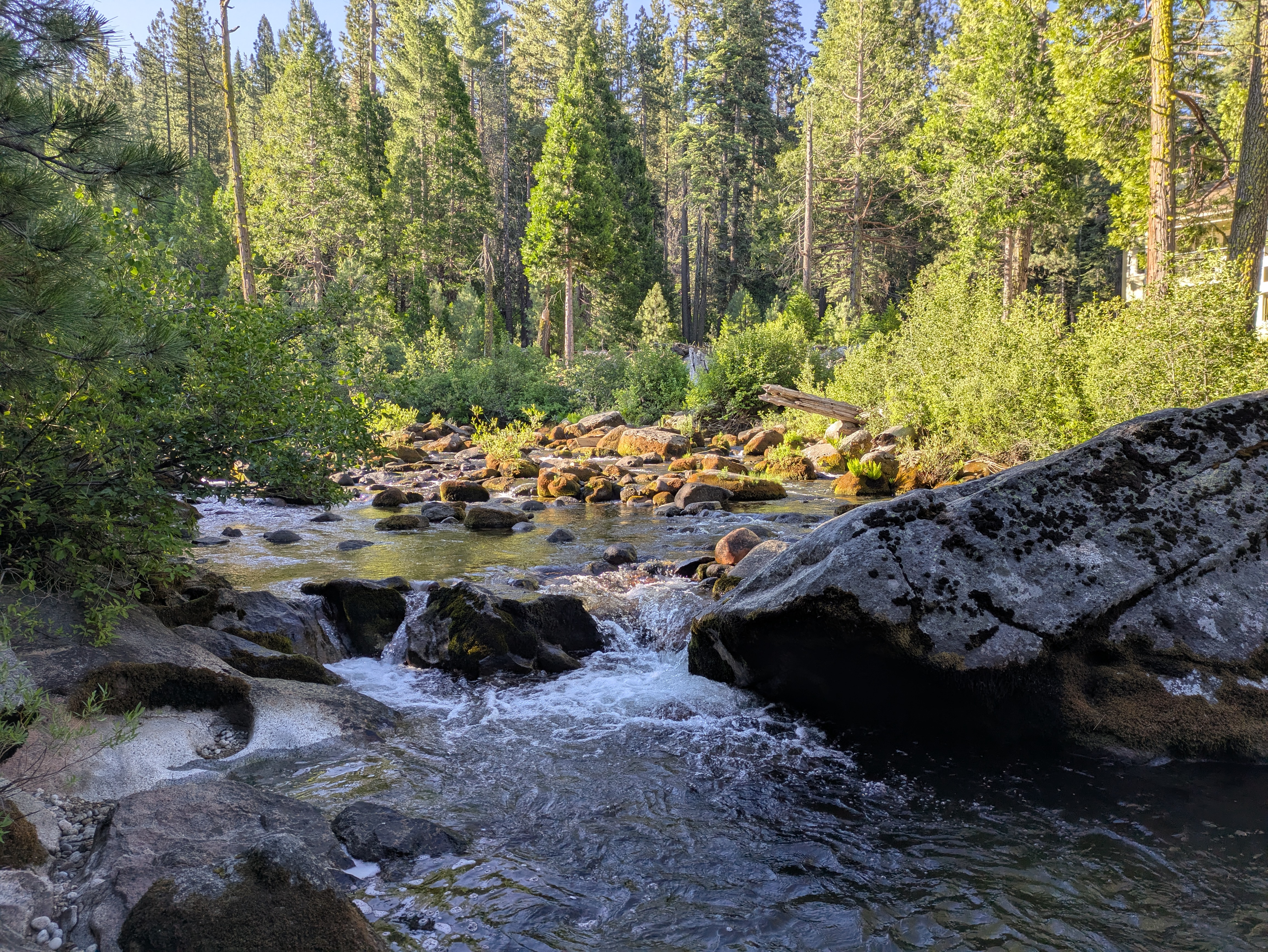
South Fork Stanislaus River

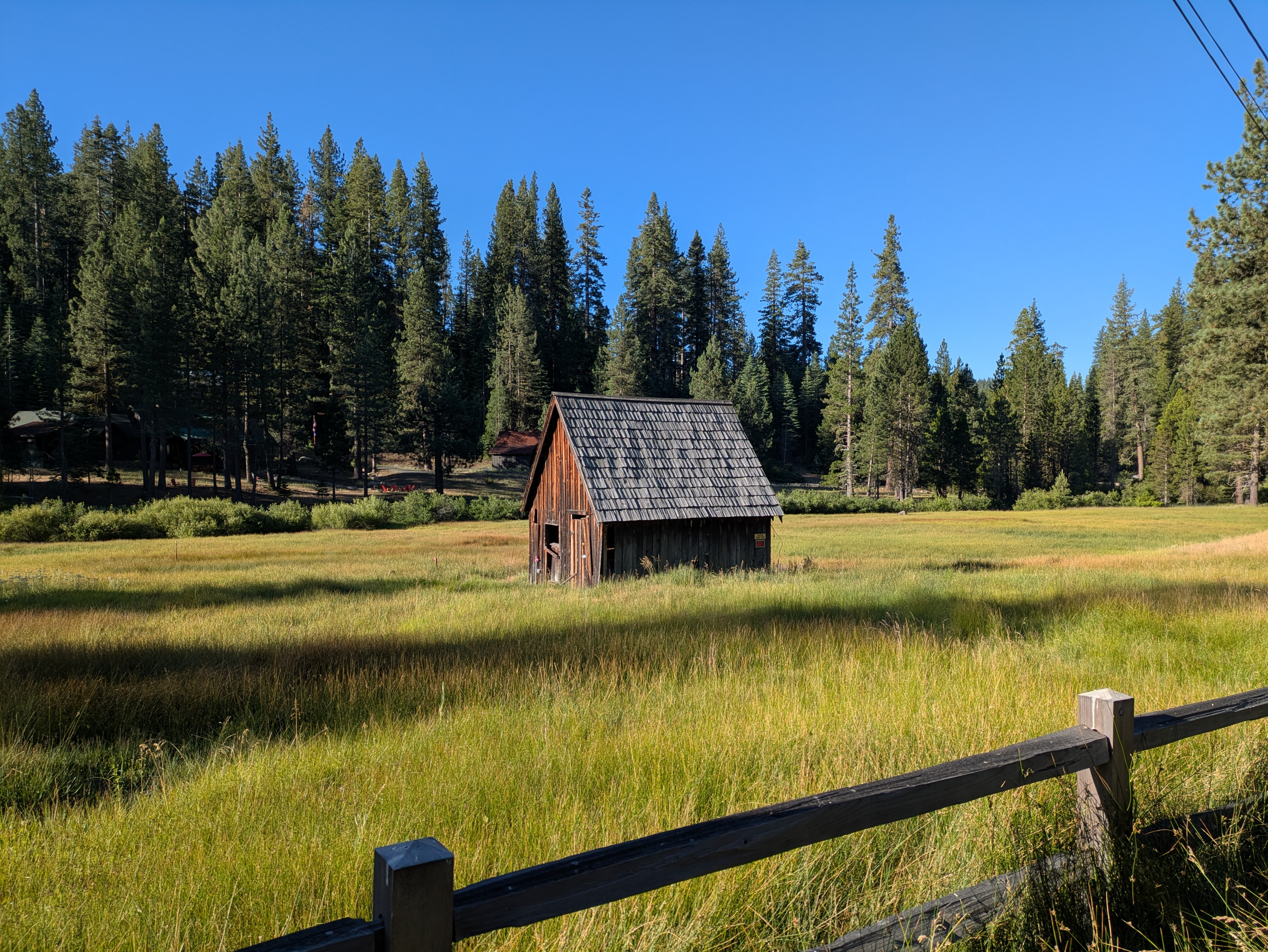
Strawberry Flat House

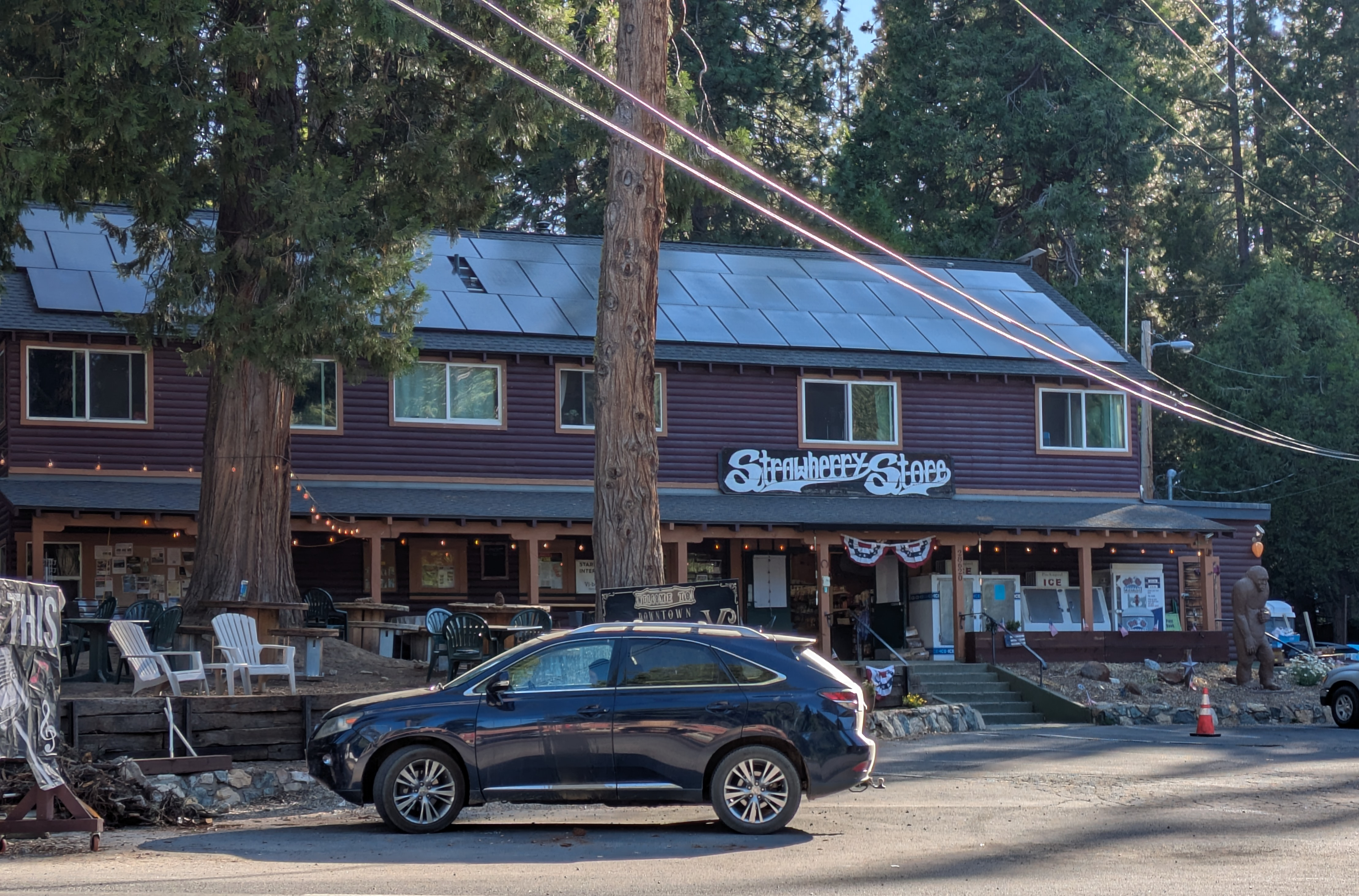
Strawberry Store

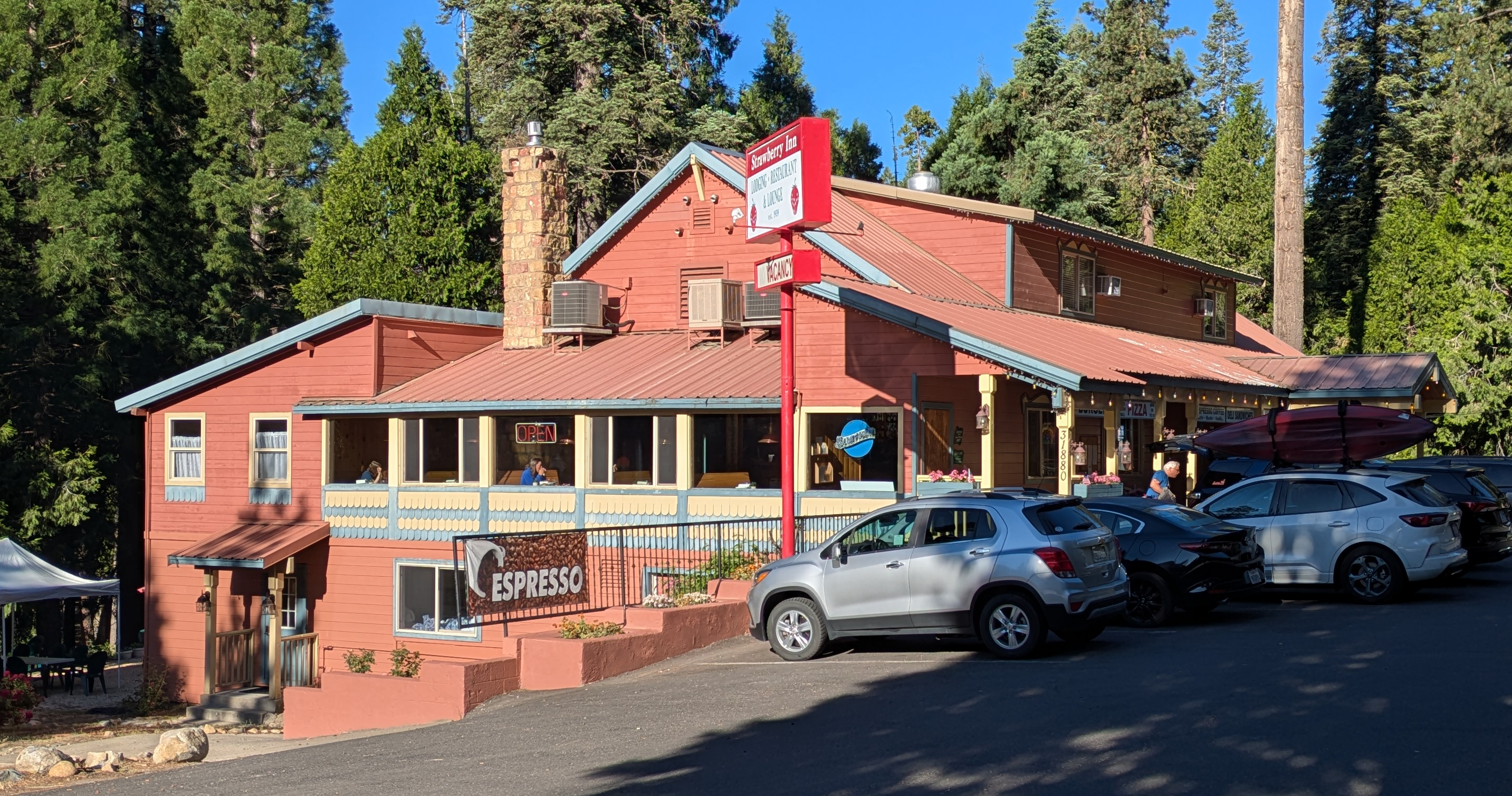
Strawberry Inn

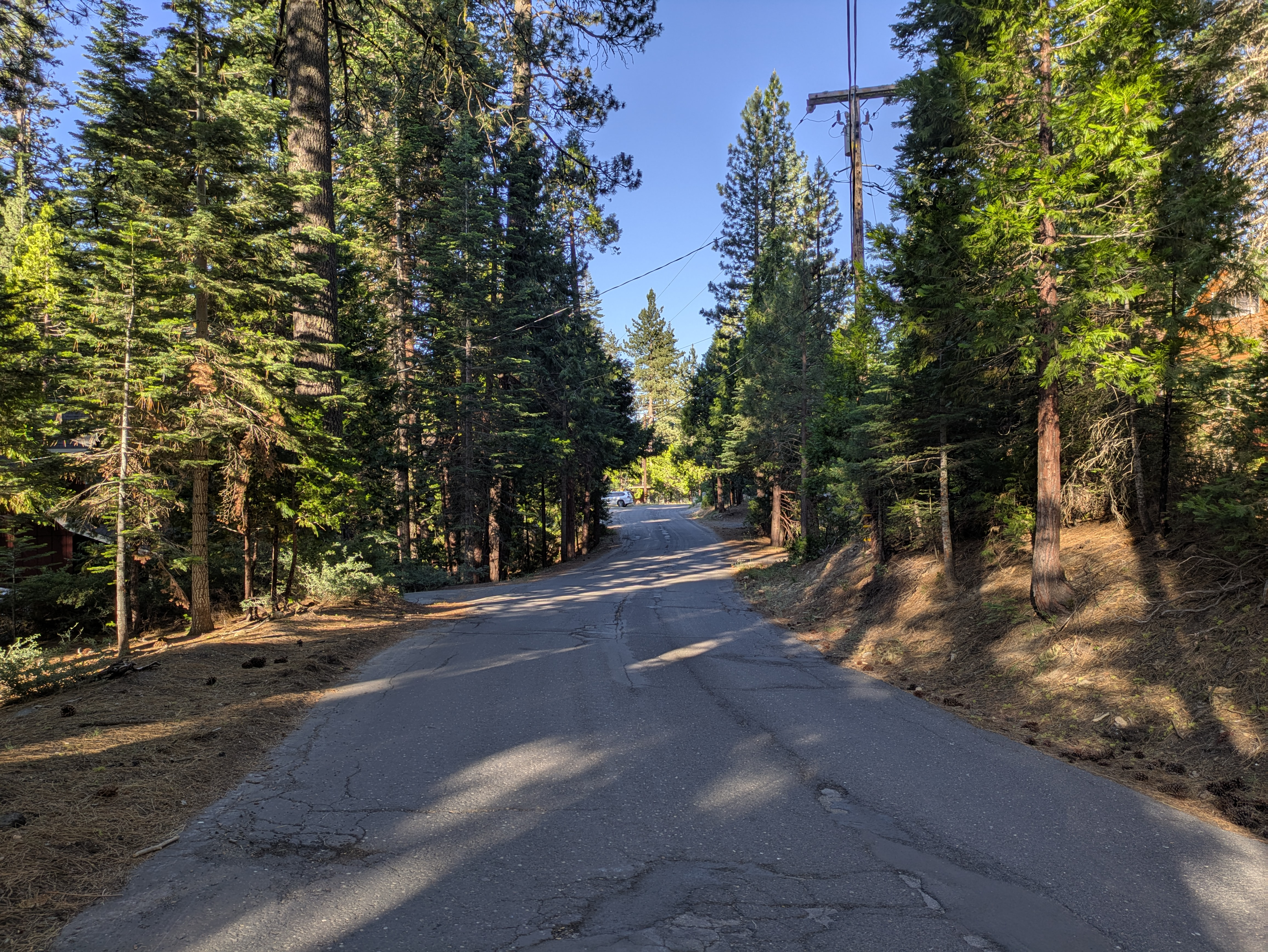

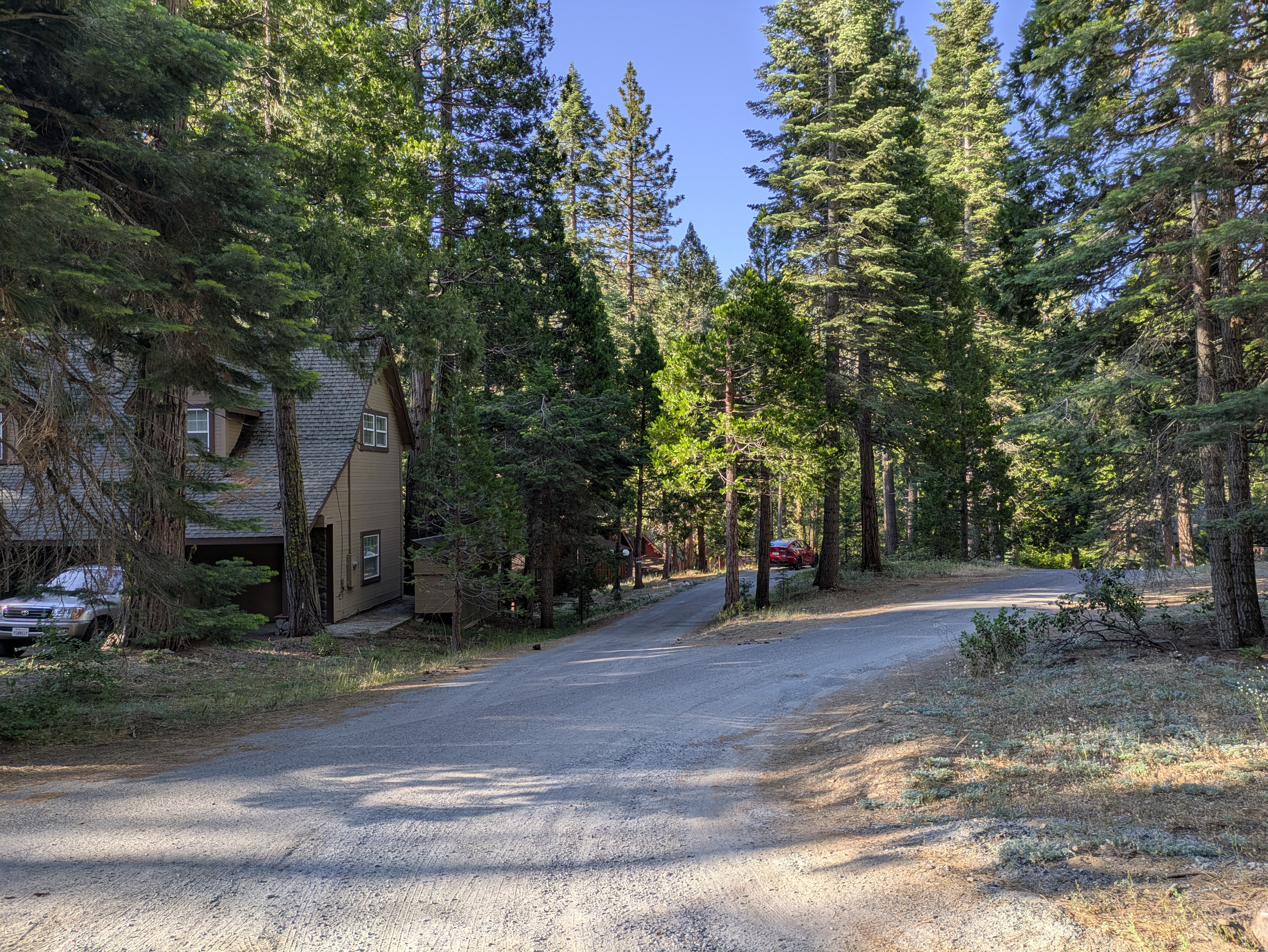
