= Stanislaus National Forest =

U.S. National Forest designated in 1976

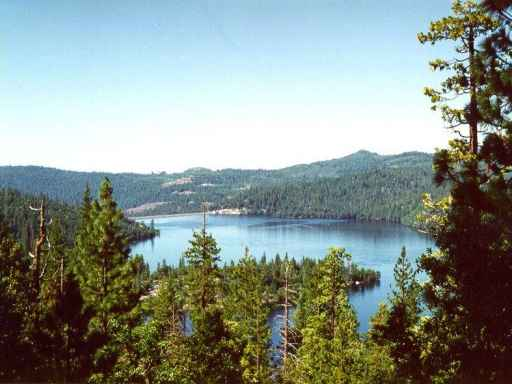
- Cherry Lake in Stanislaus National Forest
- Interactive map of Stanislaus National Forest
- Location: California, United States
- Nearest city: Sonora, California
- Coordinates: 38°15′N 120°00′W
- Area: 898,099 acres (3,634.48 km^{2})
- Established: February 22, 1897
- Governing body: U.S. Forest Service
- Website: Stanislaus National Forest

Stanislaus National Forest is a U.S. national forest which manages 898,099 acres (1,403.3 sq mi; 3,634.5 km^{2}) of land in four counties in the Sierra Nevada in Northern California. It was established on February 22, 1897, making it one of the oldest national forests. It was named after the Stanislaus River.

== Geography ==
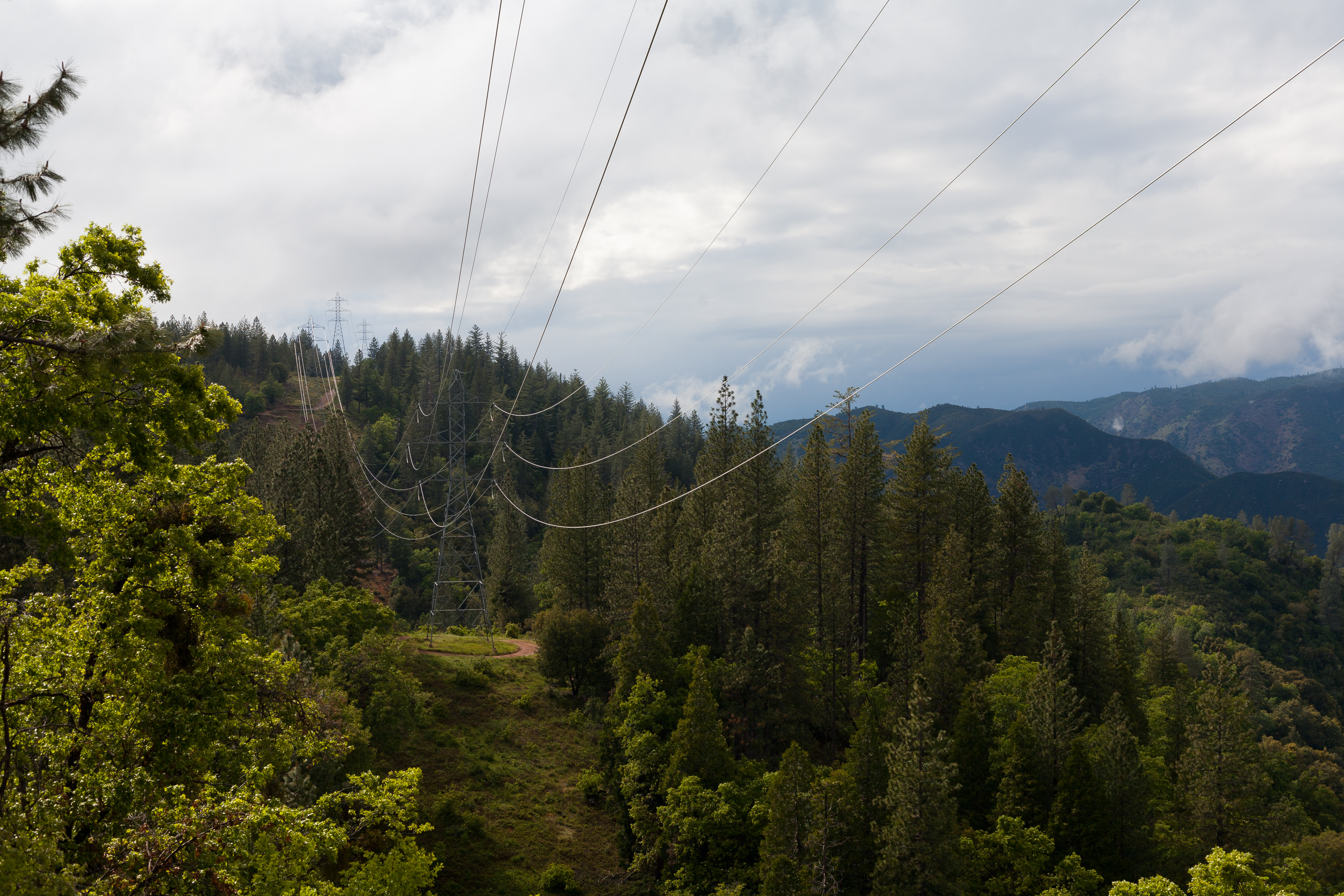
A section of Stanislaus National Forest along CA-120

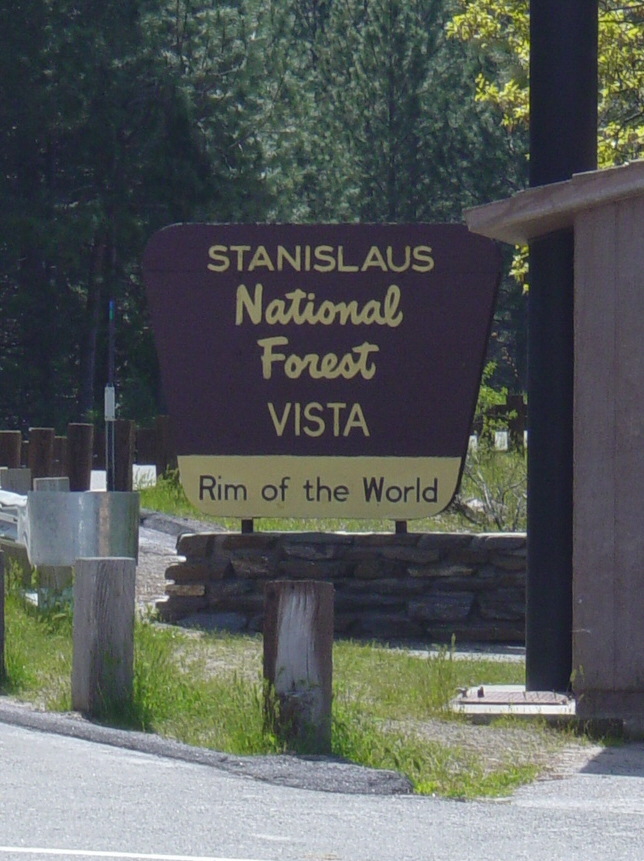
The Rim Fire of 2013 was named after the Rim of the World vista point on the forest.

The forest is located primarily in eastern Tuolumne County, adjacent to the northwestern part of Yosemite National Park, but parts of it extend (in descending order of forestland area) into Southern Alpine County, Northern Mariposa County and Eastern Calaveras County. Forest headquarters are located in Sonora, California. There are local ranger district offices in Groveland, Hathaway Pines, and Pinecrest.

The Emigrant Wilderness is located entirely within its boundaries. Portions of the Carson-Iceberg Wilderness, including the Dardanelles Cone, and the Mokelumne Wilderness are also within the Stanislaus National Forest.

== Features ==
It contains 78 lakes and 811 miles (1,305.2 km) of rivers and streams. It has 1,100 miles (1,770.3 km) of non-motorized trails and 2,859 miles (4,601.1 km) of roads, 188 miles (302.6 km) of which are paved.

The forest contains some 139,000 acres (560 km^{2}) of old growth, which includes Lodgepole Pine (Pinus contorta), Jeffrey Pine (Pinus jeffreyi) and White Fir (Abies concolor).

== Recreation ==
The proximity of the Stanislaus National Forest to the San Francisco Bay Area makes it a popular recreation destination. The volcanic and granite formations in the wilderness exist alongside heavy cattle grazing. Whitewater rafting and kayaking can be found in the wild and scenic Tuolumne River and Cherry Creek. Other rivers flowing out of the Stanislaus include the Clavey River, the Stanislaus River, as well as the Merced River along the southern boundary.

The forest is also home to the Lair of the Golden Bear, a family summer camp operated by the Cal Alumni Association of the University of California, Berkeley, near Pinecrest, which hosts nearly 10,000 visitors each summer.

Two ski resorts, Dodge Ridge and Bear Valley, operate here under a special use permit.

== 2013 Rim Fire ==
The Rim Fire was ignited on the Stanislaus National Forest in August 2013, and eventually grew to become the third-largest fire in California history. The fire was named after the Rim of the World Vista on California State Route 120, where the fire was initially reported.

== See also ==
- Chinaman Mortar Site
- Ecology of the Sierra Nevada
- List of national forests of the United States
- List of plants of the Sierra Nevada (U.S.)
- Category:Fauna of the Sierra Nevada (United States)
- Calaveras Big Tree National Forest - historical
