= Cherry Creek (Tuolumne River tributary) =

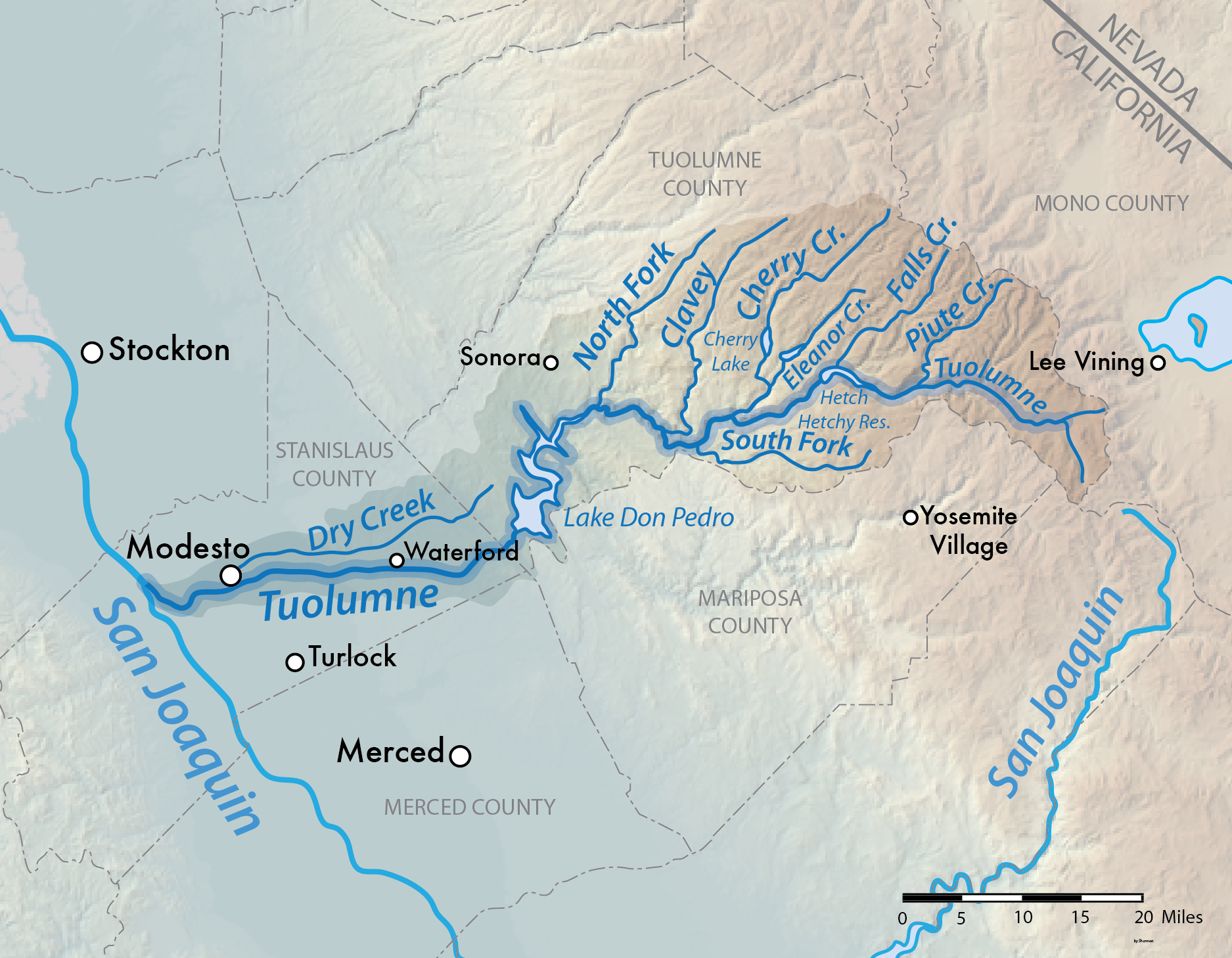
- Map of the Tuolumne River watershed, including Cherry Creek

Location
- Country: United States
- State: California

Physical characteristics
- Source: Sierra Nevada
  - location: Emigrant Wilderness, Tuolumne County
  - coordinates: 38°05′54″N 119°47′23″W
  - elevation: 7,119 ft (2,170 m)
- Mouth: Tuolumne River
  - location: West of Mather, Tuolumne County
  - coordinates: 37°53′19″N 119°58′19″W
  - elevation: 2,162 ft (659 m)
- Length: 27.7 mi (44.6 km)
- Basin size: 216.3 sq mi (560 km^{2})
- Discharge
  - location: below Holm Powerplant, near the mouth
  - average: 694 cu ft/s (19.7 m^{3}/s)
  - minimum: 1.6 cu ft/s (0.045 m^{3}/s)
  - maximum: 33,500 cu ft/s (950 m^{3}/s)

Cherry Creek is a large, swift-flowing stream in the Sierra Nevada mountain range, and is the largest tributary of the Tuolumne River. The creek is 44.6 miles (71.8 km) long measured to its farthest headwaters; the main stem itself is 27.7 miles (44.6 km) long, draining a watershed of 234 square miles (610 km^{2}) in the Stanislaus National Forest. Part of the drainage also extends into the northwest corner of Yosemite National Park.

== Geography ==
Cherry Creek originates at the confluence of its North and East Forks in Lord Meadow, at 7,119 feet (2,170 m) in the Emigrant Wilderness of the Stanislaus National Forest just north of the national park boundary. It flows west then southwest through the rugged granite formations of the deep Cherry Creek Canyon. After joining with West Fork Cherry Creek, it flows south into Cherry Lake, a large reservoir formed by the Cherry Valley Dam. Below the dam the creek receives Eleanor Creek from the left and continues for about 10 miles (16 km) south then west through a canyon in the Sierra Nevada foothills to its confluence with the Tuolumne River about 6 miles (9.7 km) west of Mather.

The East Fork Cherry Creek, 14.4 miles (23.2 km) long, has its beginnings at Summit Meadow near Bigelow Peak and the Tuolumne-Mono County line, at an elevation of 9,399 feet (2,865 m). It flows southwest through long, narrow Huckleberry Lake at 7,861 feet (2,396 m) and continues to descend steeply to the confluence with the North Fork at Lord Meadow.

The North Fork Cherry Creek is 16.9 miles (27.2 km) long. It is located north of, and flows largely parallel to the East Fork. Its source is at High Emigrant Lake, at an elevation of 9,711 feet (2,960 m). It flows southwest through Emigrant Meadow Lake, Middle Emigrant Lake and then into the much larger Emigrant Lake at 8,832 feet (2,692 m). Below Emigrant Lake it flows through Cow Meadow Lake and then continues through a canyon to its confluence with the East Fork.

The West Fork Cherry Creek, 17.8 miles (28.6 km) long, originates at the Pinto Lakes at 9,383 feet (2,860 m) and initially flows west before turning south and picking up Spring Creek. It turns southwest, receiving the larger Buck Meadow Creek from the left and then Piute Creek from the right. It joins Cherry Creek about a mile (1.6 km) above Cherry Lake at an elevation of 5,128 feet (1,563 m).

Eleanor Creek is the main tributary of lower Cherry Creek, joining it about 5 miles (8.0 km) below Cherry Valley Dam. Eleanor Creek begins at the confluence of Bartlett and Kendrick Creeks inside Yosemite National Park and flows into Lake Eleanor, a natural lake enlarged by the Lake Eleanor Dam. Below the dam it flows through a short, steep canyon before its confluence with Cherry Creek. Measured to the head of Kendrick Creek, the drainage is 23 miles (37 km) long.

== River modifications ==
The Cherry Creek watershed has a long history of development for hydroelectric power, water supply and flood control. The first dam in the Cherry Creek watershed was the multiple-arch Lake Eleanor Dam, built in 1918 as part of the Hetch Hetchy Project which provides water and power to the city of San Francisco. Although the actual source of the water supply is from the Hetch Hetchy Reservoir on the Tuolumne River, the dam at Lake Eleanor provided the electric power needed for construction work at O'Shaughnessy Dam and the Hetch Hetchy Aqueduct, and also for the construction of Cherry Valley Dam 30 years later. The first power at Early Intake Powerhouse was generated on May 6, 1918.

Construction on Cherry Valley Dam, which dams the main Cherry Creek to form Cherry Lake, began in August 1953 and was completed in October 1955. The 315-foot (96 m) high rockfill dam was built by San Francisco and the Modesto and Turlock Irrigation Districts. The reservoir has a capacity of 273,500 acre-feet (337,400,000 m^{3}) and is linked to Lake Eleanor via a tunnel, allowing the two reservoirs to essentially operate as one. It provides drinking water and flood control for communities in the Central Valley, and generates hydroelectricity at the Dion R. Holm Powerhouse (originally named Cherry Powerhouse), which began operation on August 1, 1960, superseding the Early Intake Powerhouses. A 6-mile (9.7 km) long tunnel carries water from Cherry Lake to the powerhouse where it drops 2,100 feet (640 m), powering two generators with a combined 165,000 kilowatt capacity.

== Ecology ==
Cherry Creek is home to both native and introduced fish species. Brown bullhead, brown trout and golden shiner are present both above and below Cherry Lake. The upper part of Cherry Creek has wild brook trout, and green sunfish are present in the lower creek. Before the damming of the Tuolumne River in the early 20th century, the creek also had annual runs of chinook salmon and steelhead trout.

== Recreation ==
At its headwaters, Cherry Creek flows through granite valleys similar to those found in Yosemite Valley, though these areas are accessible only to backpackers.

Whitewater rafting on portions of Cherry Creek is classed in the very difficult Class V/V+ category and has been called by one commentator "without a doubt the most difficult commercially run river in the country."

== See also ==
- List of rivers of California
