= Night Cap Peak =

Mountain in California, United States

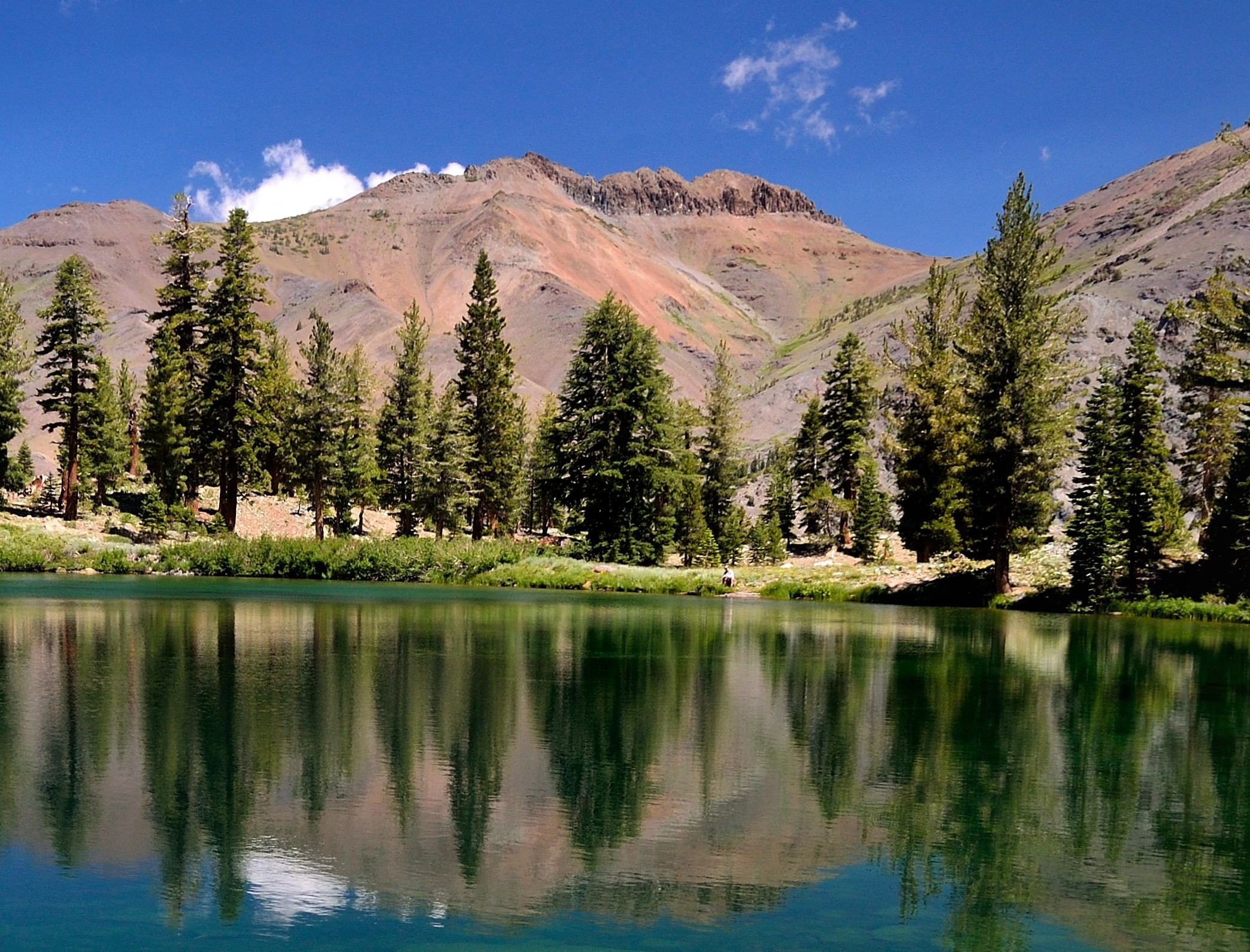
- South aspect, from Sharon Lake

Highest point
- Elevation: 10,641 ft (3,243 m)
- Prominence: 481 ft (147 m)
- Parent peak: Peak 11220
- Isolation: 1.15 mi (1.85 km)
- Coordinates: 38°18′29″N 119°41′28″W

Naming
- Etymology: Nightcap

Geography
- Location within California Location within the United States
- Location: Emigrant Wilderness
- Country: United States of America
- State: California
- County: Tuolumne
- Parent range: Sierra Nevada
- Topo map: USGS Sonora Pass

Night Cap Peak is a 10,641-foot-elevation (3,243-meter) mountain summit located in Tuolumne County, California, United States.

== Description ==
Night Cap Peak is set along the boundary of the Emigrant Wilderness on land managed by Stanislaus National Forest. The peak is part of the Sierra Nevada mountain range and is situated 2.6 miles northwest of Leavitt Peak, and three miles west-southwest of Sonora Pass. Topographic relief is significant as the summit rises over 4,400 feet (1,300 meters) above Kennedy Meadow in three miles. Precipitation runoff from this mountain drains into Kennedy and Deadman creeks which are tributaries of the Middle Fork Stanislaus River.

== Etymology ==
The peak was named "Night Cap" in the 1890s by the USGS, presumably because of its resemblance to a nightcap. The landform's present toponym was officially adopted in 1979 by the U.S. Board on Geographic Names.

== Climate ==
According to the Köppen climate classification system, Night Cap Peak is located in an alpine climate zone. Most weather fronts originate in the Pacific Ocean, and travel east toward the Sierra Nevada mountains. As fronts approach, they are forced upward by the peaks (orographic lift), causing moisture in the form of rain or snowfall to drop onto the range.

== Gallery ==
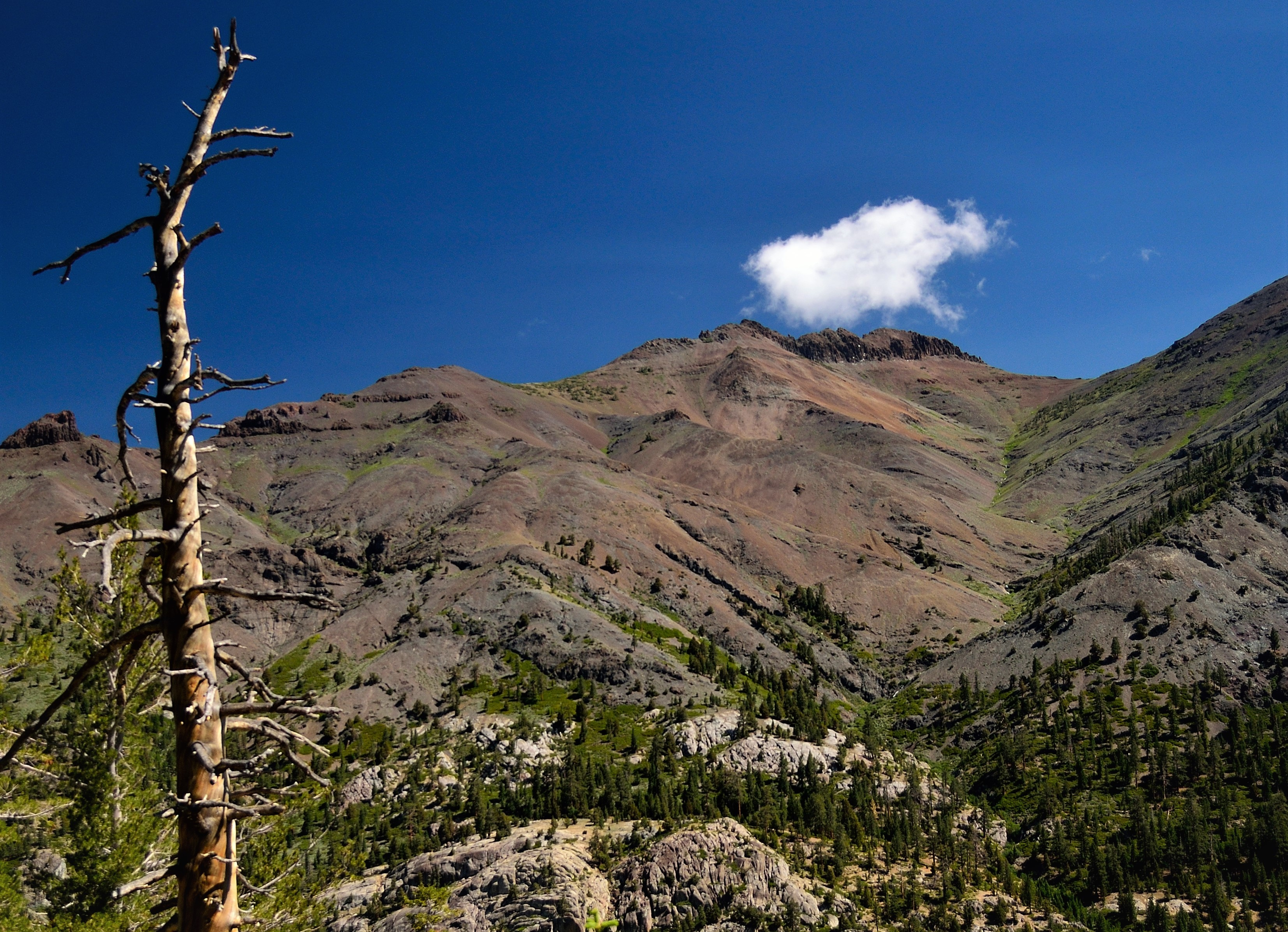
South aspect

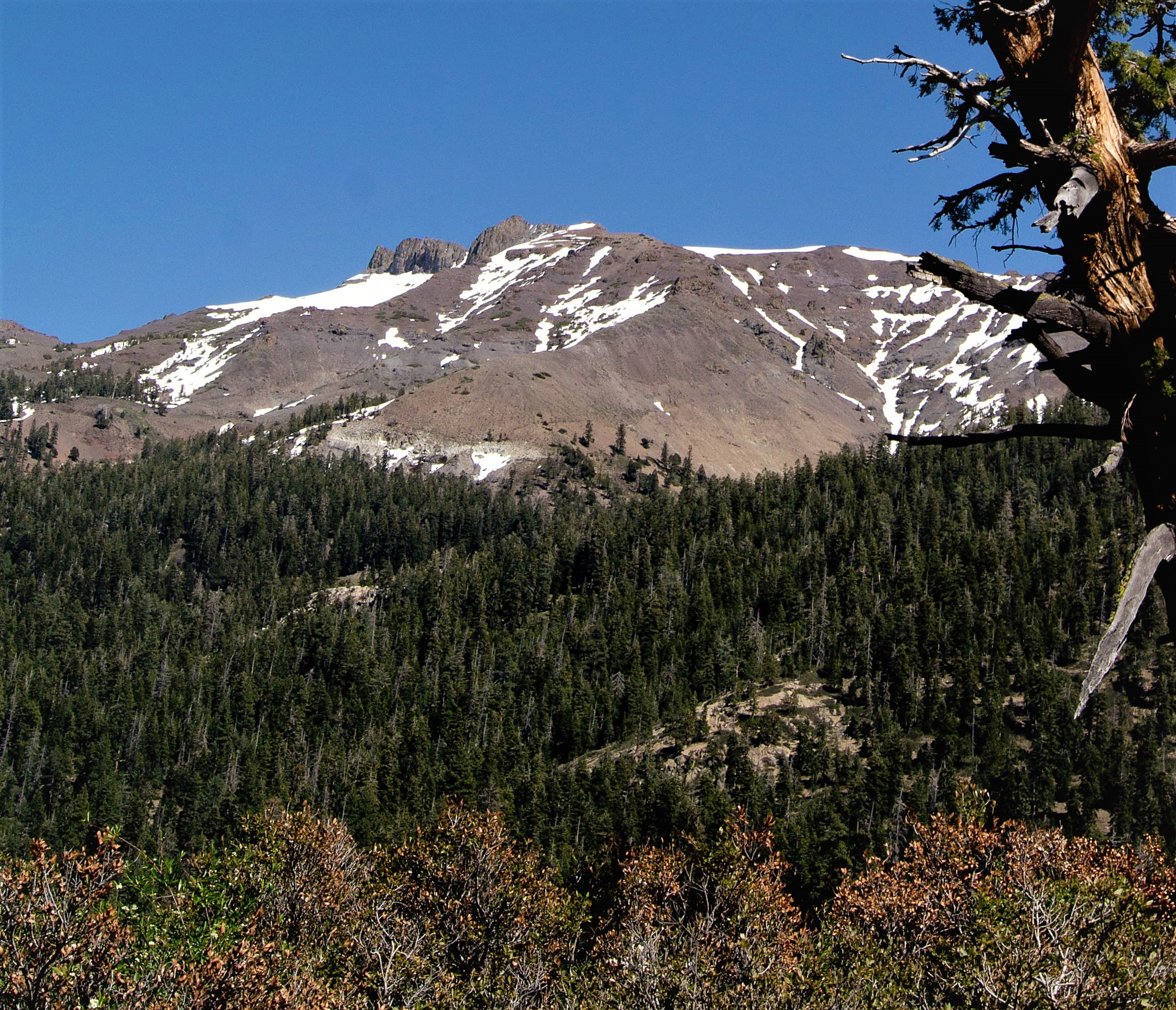
West aspect

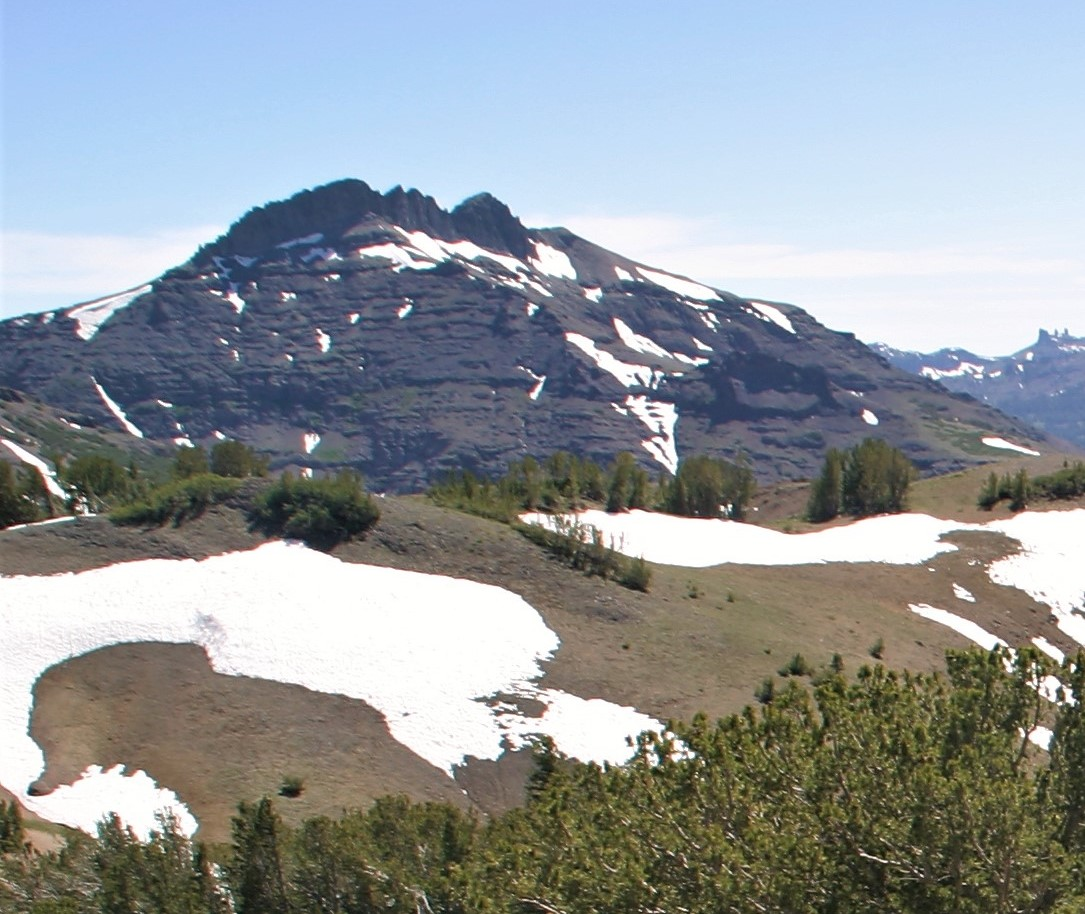
Northeast aspect

== See also ==
- Kennedy Peak
- Granite Dome
