= Granite Dome (Tuolumne County, California) =

Mountain in California, United States

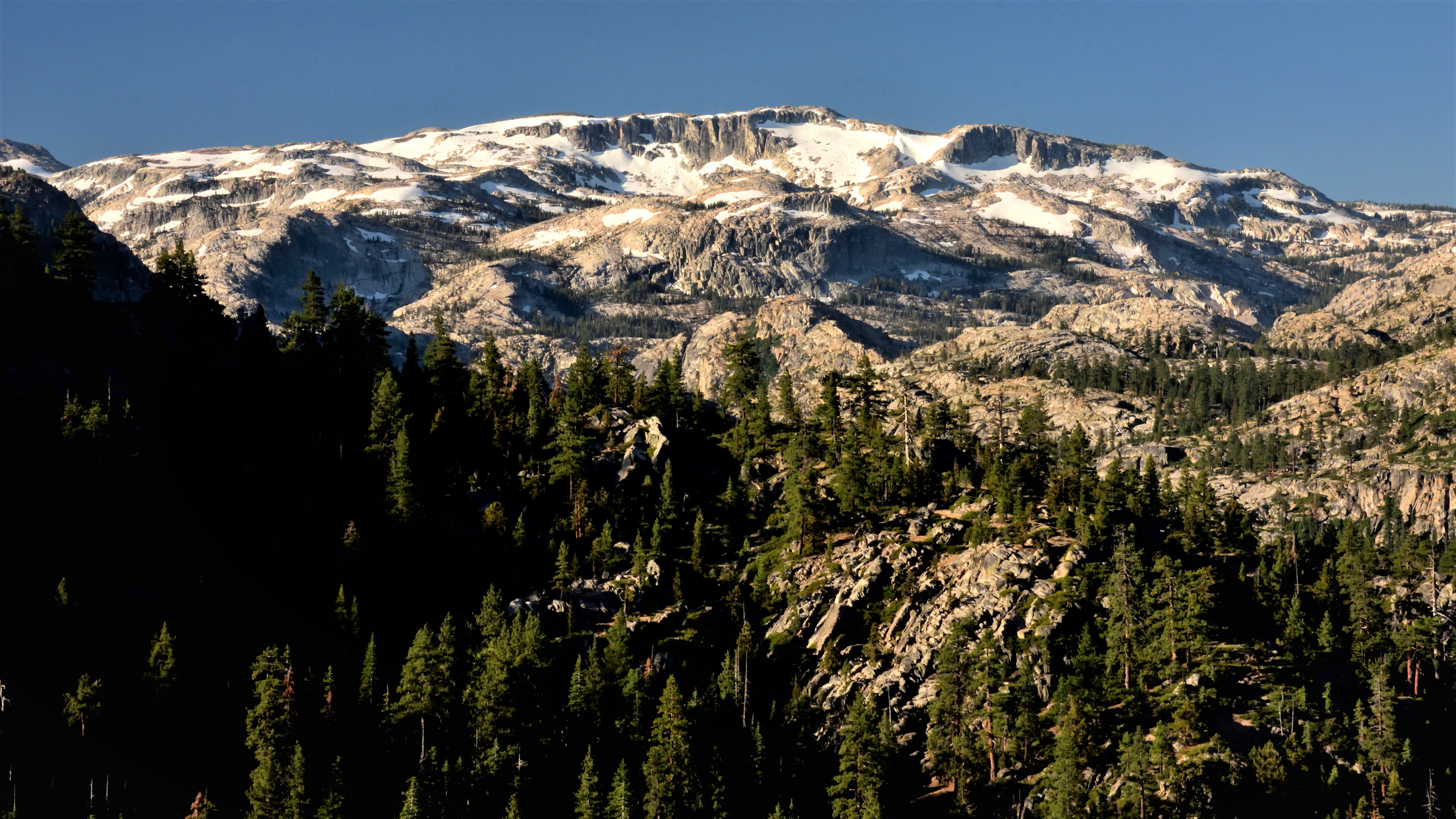
- North aspect, from Highway 108

Highest point
- Elevation: 10,320 ft (3,146 m)
- Prominence: 560 ft (171 m)
- Parent peak: Black Hawk Mountain (10,348 ft)
- Isolation: 2.12 mi (3.41 km)
- Coordinates: 38°12′55″N 119°44′46″W

Naming
- Etymology: Granite dome

Geography
- Location within California Location within the United States
- Location: Emigrant Wilderness
- Country: United States of America
- State: California
- County: Tuolumne
- Parent range: Sierra Nevada
- Topo map: USGS Emigrant Lake

Geology
- Rock age: Cretaceous
- Mountain type: Granite dome

Granite Dome is a 10,320-foot-elevation (3,150-meter) mountain summit located in Tuolumne County, California, United States.

== Description ==
Granite Dome is set within the Emigrant Wilderness on land managed by Stanislaus National Forest. The peak is part of the Sierra Nevada mountain range and is situated 2.1 miles west of line parent Black Hawk Mountain, and four miles southeast of Three Chimneys. Topographic relief is modest as the north aspect rises 2,300 feet (700 meters) above Relief Valley in two miles. Precipitation runoff from this mountain drains south to the Tuolumne River via Cherry Creek, and north to the Middle Fork Stanislaus River via Relief and Summit creeks. The landform's descriptive toponym was applied by the USGS, has been officially adopted by the U.S. Board on Geographic Names, and has appeared in publications since at least 1899. This landform is the only one officially named "Granite Dome" in the United States despite being located just nine miles north of Yosemite National Park which is well known for its granite domes.

== Climate ==
According to the Köppen climate classification system, Granite Dome is located in an alpine climate zone. Most weather fronts originate in the Pacific Ocean, and travel east toward the Sierra Nevada mountains. As fronts approach, they are forced upward by the peaks (orographic lift), causing moisture in the form of rain or snowfall to drop onto the range.

== See also ==
- Kennedy Peak
- Granite Domes of Yosemite National Park
