= The Three Chimneys (Tuolumne County, California) =

Mountain in California, United States

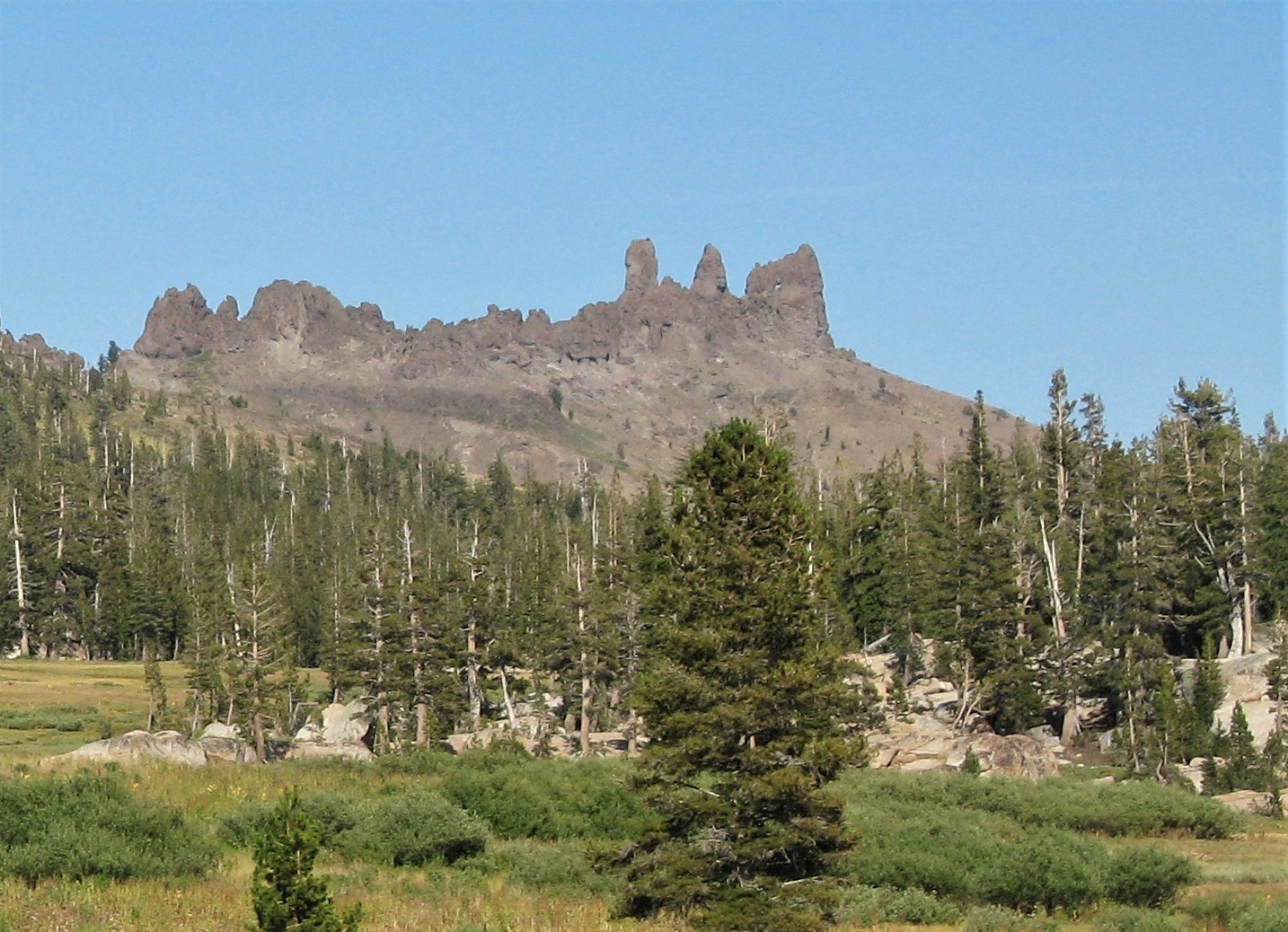
- Southwest aspect

Highest point
- Elevation: 9,882 ft (3,012 m)
- Prominence: 482 ft (147 m)
- Parent peak: Peak 9896
- Isolation: 1.32 mi (2.12 km)
- Coordinates: 38°15′12″N 119°48′06″W

Geography
- Location within California Location within the United States
- Location: Emigrant Wilderness
- Country: United States of America
- State: California
- County: Tuolumne
- Parent range: Sierra Nevada
- Topo map: USGS Dardanelle

Geology
- Mountain type: Volcanic plug

The Three Chimneys is a 9,882-foot elevation (3,012 m) mountain summit located in Tuolumne County, California, United States.

== Description ==
The Three Chimneys is set on the boundary of the Emigrant Wilderness on land managed by Stanislaus National Forest. The landform is part of the Sierra Nevada mountain range and is situated four miles northwest of Granite Dome. Topographic relief is modest as the north aspect rises 1,900 feet (580 m) above Long Valley in one mile (1.6 km). Precipitation runoff from this mountain drains into tributaries of the Stanislaus River. The landform's descriptive toponym has been officially adopted by the U.S. Board on Geographic Names.

== Climate ==
According to the Köppen climate classification system, Three Chimneys is located in an alpine climate zone. Most weather fronts originate in the Pacific Ocean, and travel east toward the Sierra Nevada mountains. As fronts approach, they are forced upward by the peaks (orographic lift), causing moisture in the form of rain or snowfall to drop onto the range.

== Gallery ==
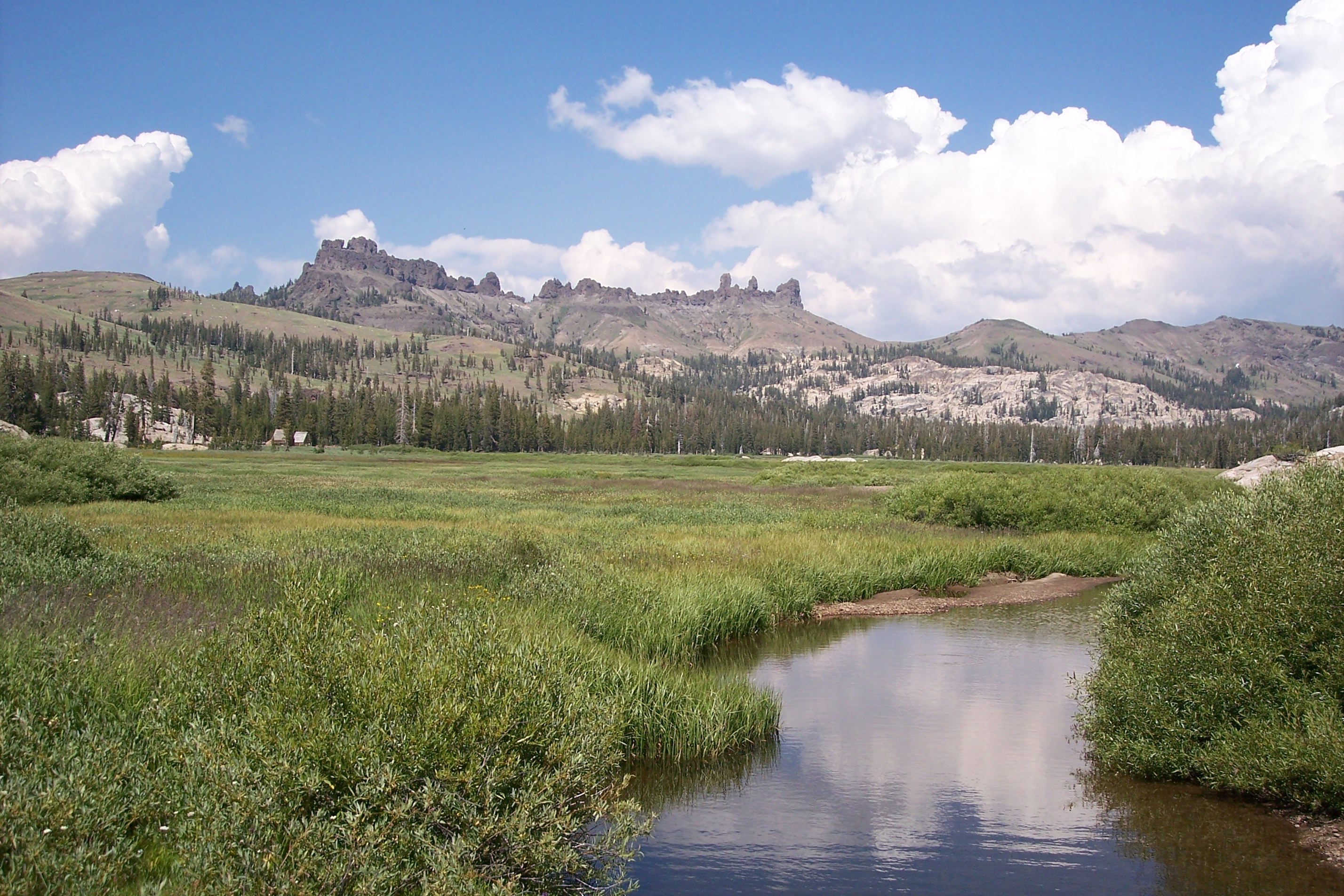
From southwest at Cooper Meadow

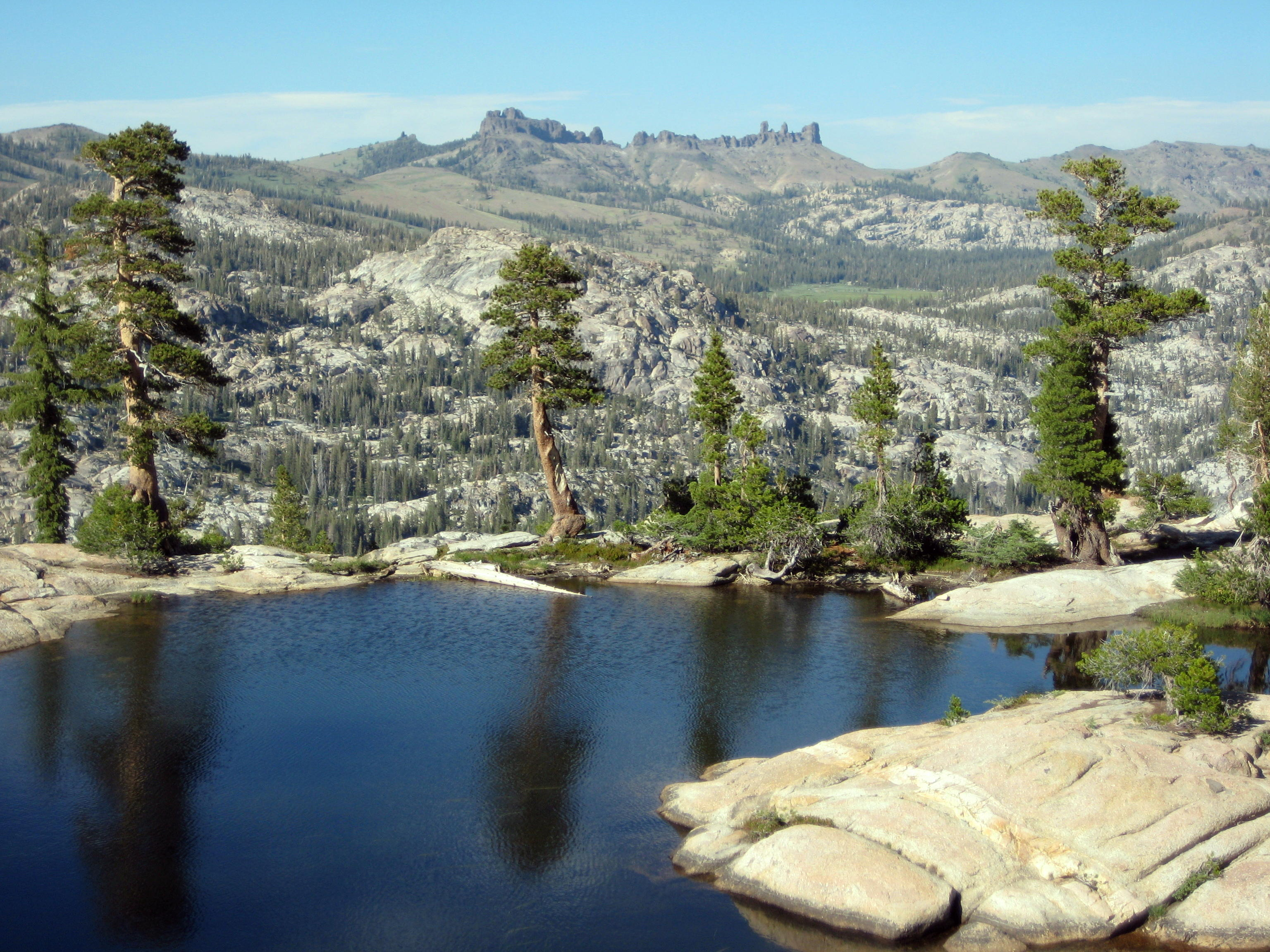
From the southwest

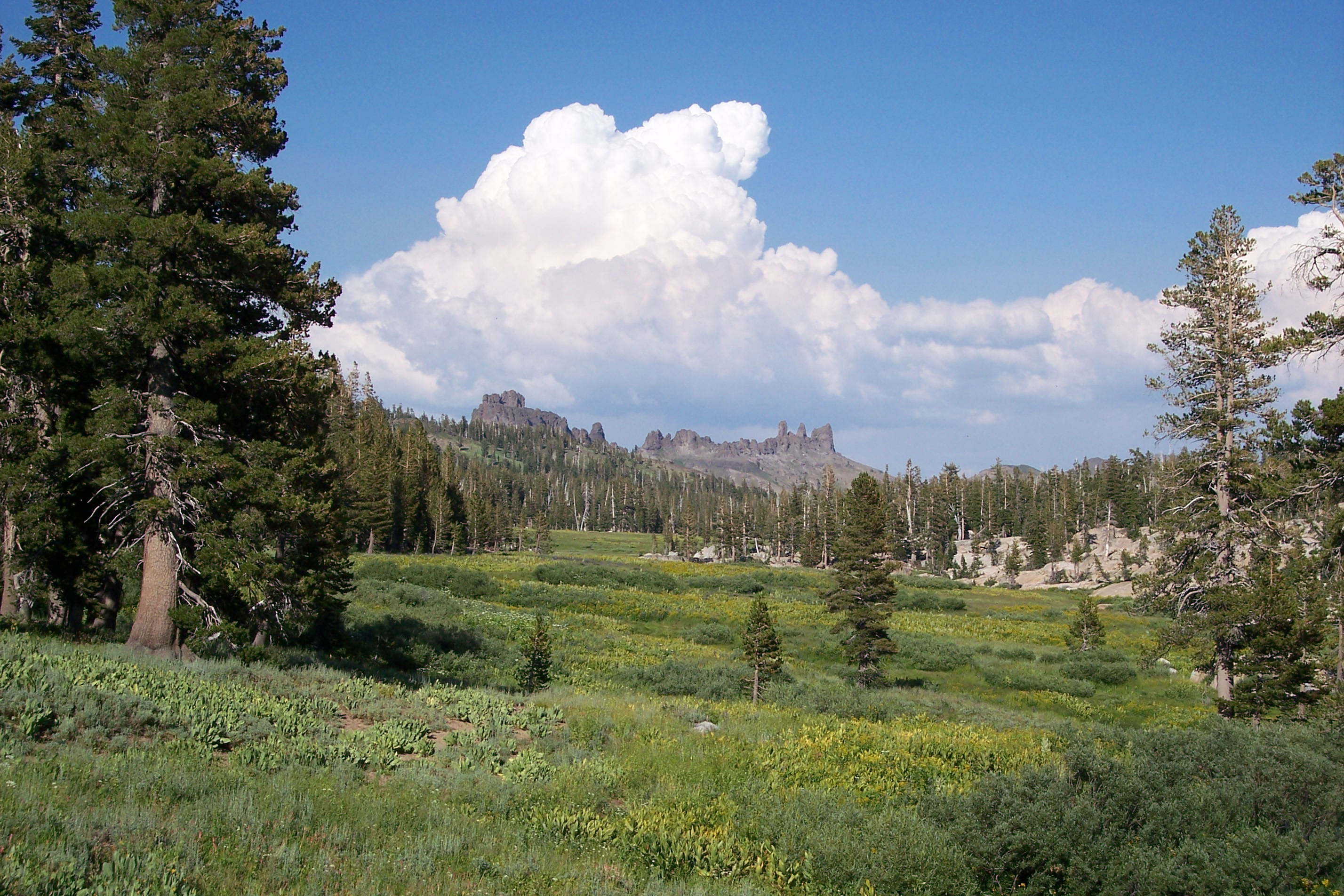
Three Chimneys from Horse and Cow Meadow
