= Cherry Lake =

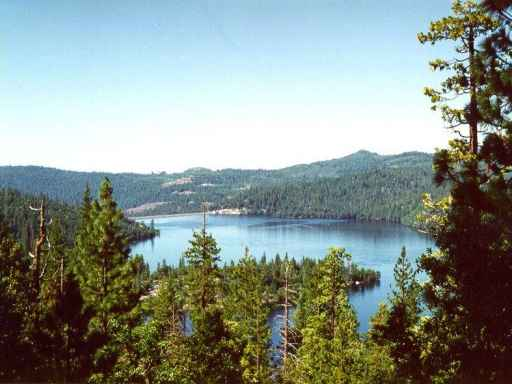

- Location within California Location within the United States
- Location: Stanislaus National Forest; Tuolumne County, California
- Coordinates: 38.0013°N 119.9046°W
- Type: Reservoir
- Primary inflows: Cherry Creek
- Primary outflows: Cherry Creek
- Catchment area: 114 sq mi (300 km^{2})
- Basin countries: United States
- Surface area: 1,535 acres (621 ha)
- Water volume: 273,500 acre⋅ft (337,400,000 m^{3})
- Surface elevation: 1,420 m (4,660 ft)
- References: U.S. Geological Survey Geographic Names Information System: Cherry Lake

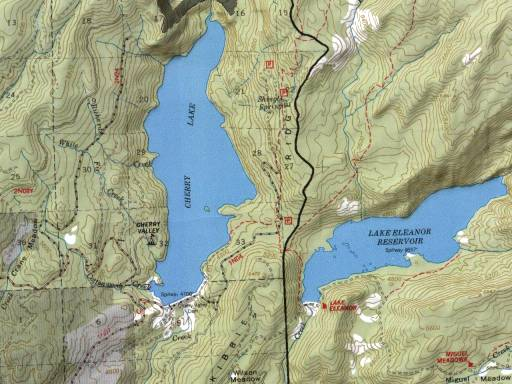

Cherry Lake (also known as Lake Lloyd) is an artificial lake in the Stanislaus National Forest of Tuolumne County, California, U.S.A., about 25 miles (40 km) east of the city of Sonora. It is at an elevation of 4,700 feet (1,433 m) on the western side of the Sierra Nevada, and lies just outside the western boundary of Yosemite National Park. The lake has a capacity of 273,500 acre⋅ft (337,400,000 m^{3}) and is formed by Cherry Valley Dam on Cherry Creek.

The East and West forks of Cherry Creek combine just a couple of miles before reaching the lake, while the North Fork joins the East Fork about 10 miles (16 km) earlier. All three forks begin in the Emigrant Wilderness and all of them flow roughly southwest. The North Fork's source is Emigrant Lake, which is at an elevation of 8,800 ft (2,680 m). The East Fork's source is a couple of miles (~6 – 8 km) southwest of the Mono County line and flows into Huckleberry Lake several miles (~6 – 8 km) later. The East and North forks meet several miles (~6 – 8 km) downstream of the lake. There are no lakes on the West Fork. Eleanor Creek, which forms Lake Eleanor, flows into Cherry Creek several miles (~6 – 8 km) downstream from Cherry Valley Dam. Lake Eleanor is another Hetch Hetchy Project facility. Cherry Creek flows into the Tuolumne River several miles (~6 – 8 km) later.

== Cherry Valley Campground ==
This campground offers sites on both reservation and first come, first served basis. They have food storage containers, picnic tables and fire rings, with grates for cooking. Some sites offer beautiful lake vistas. The roads through the campground are paved. There are bathroom facilities but no showers. Running water is located every few campsites.

== Cherry Valley Dam ==
The dam is composed of earth and rock-fill and has a height of 315 ft (96 m) above the original streambed. It was built by San Francisco City and County and the Modesto Irrigation District and Turlock Irrigation District. It was completed in 1956; 70 years ago. The lake stores water for the Hetch Hetchy Project, which supplies drinking water to the San Francisco Bay Area, Modesto and Turlock districts. Recreation available at the lake includes, boating, skiing, swimming and fishing. Human contact with the water is allowed because the water has to be filtered anyway. Water from the lake powers the Dion R. Holm Power Plant, a 165 MW hydroelectric facility.

== Climate ==
Cherry Lake has a warm-Mediterranean climate featuring warm to sometimes hot dry summers, with rare small thunderstorms, and cool, snowy, and rainy winters that receive above average precipitation for California due to its location on the western slope of the Sierra Nevada mountain range. Its elevation of 4600 feet is high enough for snowfall in the winters but not high enough for significant amounts that are the only form of precipitation during the cooler months.

Climate data for Cherry Valley Dam (1991–2020 normals, extremes 1955–present)
Month	Jan	Feb	Mar	Apr	May	Jun	Jul	Aug	Sep	Oct	Nov	Dec	Year
Record high °F (°C)	73 (23)	74 (23)	80 (27)	85 (29)	94 (34)	103 (39)	105 (41)	103 (39)	104 (40)	94 (34)	82 (28)	76 (24)	105 (41)
Mean daily maximum °F (°C)	49.4 (9.7)	51.0 (10.6)	55.4 (13.0)	61.4 (16.3)	70.0 (21.1)	80.5 (26.9)	89.2 (31.8)	88.9 (31.6)	82.2 (27.9)	70.2 (21.2)	57.0 (13.9)	48.6 (9.2)	67.0 (19.4)
Daily mean °F (°C)	40.3 (4.6)	41.0 (5.0)	44.4 (6.9)	49.0 (9.4)	56.9 (13.8)	65.9 (18.8)	73.7 (23.2)	73.2 (22.9)	67.4 (19.7)	57.4 (14.1)	46.6 (8.1)	39.9 (4.4)	54.6 (12.6)
Mean daily minimum °F (°C)	31.3 (−0.4)	30.9 (−0.6)	33.3 (0.7)	36.7 (2.6)	43.8 (6.6)	51.4 (10.8)	58.1 (14.5)	57.4 (14.1)	52.7 (11.5)	44.5 (6.9)	36.2 (2.3)	31.2 (−0.4)	42.3 (5.7)
Record low °F (°C)	4 (−16)	−2 (−19)	6 (−14)	14 (−10)	22 (−6)	29 (−2)	39 (4)	35 (2)	28 (−2)	17 (−8)	12 (−11)	−3 (−19)	−3 (−19)
Average precipitation inches (mm)	9.65 (245)	8.28 (210)	7.36 (187)	3.93 (100)	2.57 (65)	0.82 (21)	0.29 (7.4)	0.08 (2.0)	0.43 (11)	2.74 (70)	4.61 (117)	8.29 (211)	49.05 (1,246)
Average snowfall inches (cm)	21.0 (53)	26.4 (67)	21.1 (54)	10.5 (27)	1.1 (2.8)	0.1 (0.25)	0.0 (0.0)	0.0 (0.0)	0.0 (0.0)	0.5 (1.3)	5.6 (14)	21.3 (54)	107.6 (273)
Average precipitation days (≥ 0.01 in)	10.2	10.5	10.6	7.7	6.5	2.4	1.1	1.0	2.1	4.2	7.0	9.2	72.5
Average snowy days (≥ 0.1 in)	5.1	5.6	4.7	2.3	0.5	0.0	0.0	0.0	0.0	0.2	1.4	4.6	24.4
Source: NOAA

== See also ==
- Hetch Hetchy Reservoir
- List of dams and reservoirs in California
- List of lakes in California
- List of largest reservoirs of California
