= Judge Leavitt =

Judge Leavitt may refer to:

- Hiram Leavitt (1824–1901), Mono County, California, state court judge
- Humphrey H. Leavitt (1796–1873), judge of the United States District Courts for the District of Ohio and the Southern District of Ohio
- Jonathan Leavitt (1764–1830), judge of Probate in Massachusetts
- Myron E. Leavitt (1930–2004)judge of the Nevada District Court until being elected to the Nevada Supreme Court
