= Leavitt Peak =

Mountain in California, United States

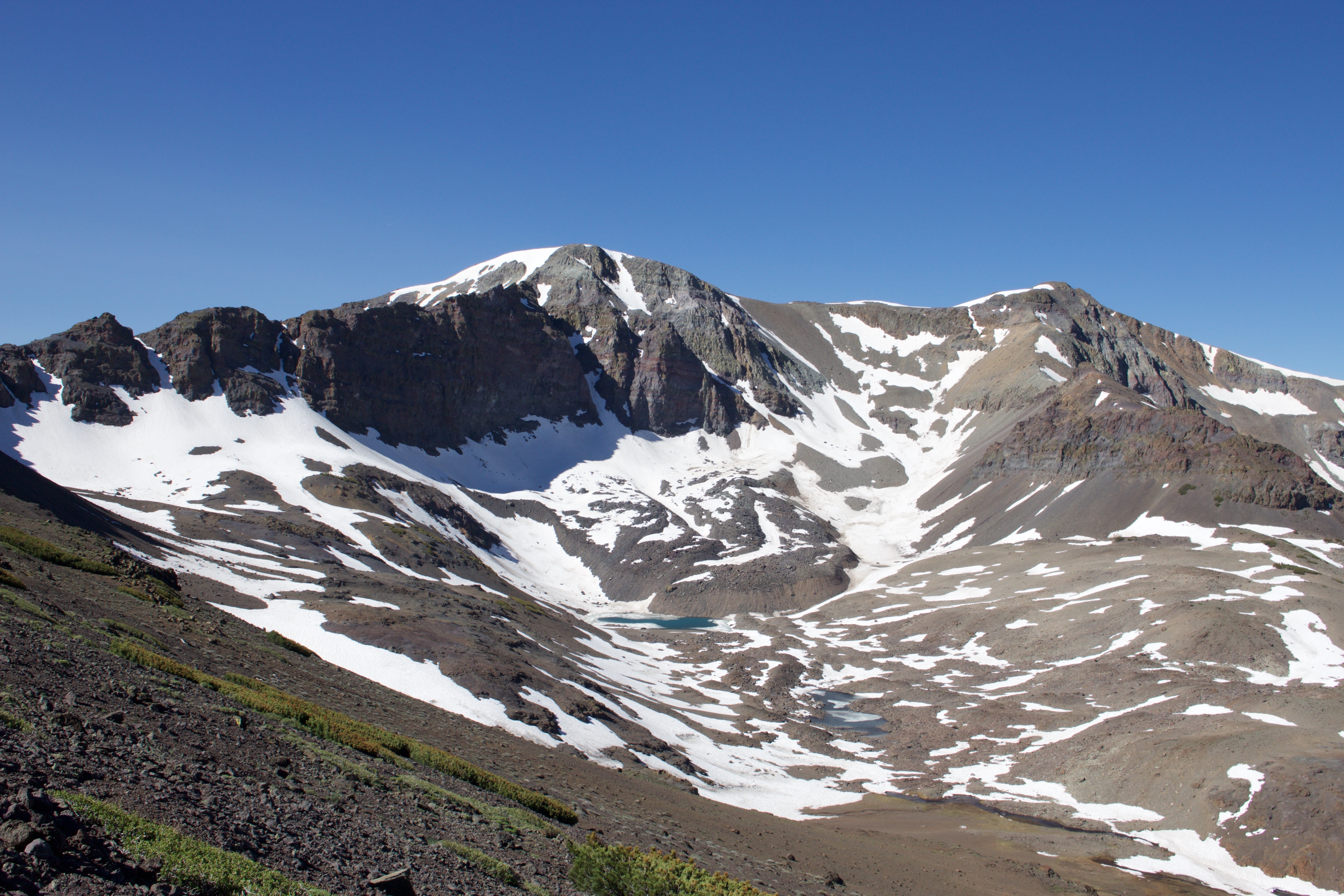
- North aspect

Highest point
- Elevation: 11,573 ft (3,527 m) NAVD 88
- Prominence: 2,049 ft (625 m)
- Listing: Sierra Peaks Section; Vagmarken Club Sierra Crest List; Western States Climbers Emblem peak
- Coordinates: 38°17′10″N 119°39′05″W

Geography
- Location within California Location within the United States
- Location: Mono / Tuolumne counties, California, U.S.
- Parent range: Sierra Nevada
- Topo map: USGS Sonora Pass

Climbing
- Easiest route: off trail hike, class 1

Leavitt Peak is located in the Emigrant Wilderness near Sonora Pass in the eastern Sierra Nevada range of California. Leavitt Peak is located on the Tuolumne County - Mono County line. The Pacific Crest Trail runs close to the east of Leavitt Peak, at an elevation of about 10,800 feet (3,290 m) elevation. The peak offers views south to Yosemite National Park and north towards South Lake Tahoe.

Leavitt Peak is named for Hiram Leavitt, a native of New Hampshire and an early judge in Mono County. He built a hotel and home in 1863 at the foot of the east end of Sonora Pass to serve the growing number of travelers between Sonora and Aurora, primarily miners headed to the gold mines at nearby Bodie. Leavitt also erected a stagecoach station at what is called Leavitt Station. Leavitt Peak is a popular hiking destination. Leavitt Lake and Leavitt Meadow are nearby along the West Walker River and are also named for the early Leavitt family settlers. Leavitt's is recorded on Charles F. Hoffmann's map of 1873. and Levitt Peak appears on the Mining Bureau map of 1891.

== Climate ==
According to the Köppen climate classification system, Leavitt Peak is located in an alpine climate zone. Most weather fronts originate in the Pacific Ocean, and travel east toward the Sierra Nevada mountains. As fronts approach, they are forced upward by the peaks (orographic lift), causing moisture in the form of rain or snowfall to drop onto the range.

Climate data for Leavitt Peak 38.2847 N, 119.6490 W, Elevation: 11,115 ft (3,388 m) (1991–2020 normals, extremes 1989–present)
Month	Jan	Feb	Mar	Apr	May	Jun	Jul	Aug	Sep	Oct	Nov	Dec	Year
Mean daily maximum °F (°C)	31.3 (−0.4)	30.5 (−0.8)	33.2 (0.7)	37.1 (2.8)	44.9 (7.2)	54.7 (12.6)	62.9 (17.2)	62.2 (16.8)	56.5 (13.6)	47.5 (8.6)	37.3 (2.9)	31.2 (−0.4)	44.1 (6.7)
Daily mean °F (°C)	22.4 (−5.3)	21.0 (−6.1)	23.2 (−4.9)	26.1 (−3.3)	33.4 (0.8)	42.5 (5.8)	50.1 (10.1)	49.3 (9.6)	43.9 (6.6)	35.9 (2.2)	27.9 (−2.3)	22.3 (−5.4)	33.2 (0.7)
Mean daily minimum °F (°C)	13.5 (−10.3)	11.4 (−11.4)	13.1 (−10.5)	15.1 (−9.4)	21.9 (−5.6)	30.3 (−0.9)	37.3 (2.9)	36.5 (2.5)	31.3 (−0.4)	24.4 (−4.2)	18.4 (−7.6)	13.4 (−10.3)	22.2 (−5.4)
Average precipitation inches (mm)	9.78 (248)	8.81 (224)	8.10 (206)	5.18 (132)	3.09 (78)	1.01 (26)	0.78 (20)	0.51 (13)	0.96 (24)	3.40 (86)	6.13 (156)	9.59 (244)	57.34 (1,457)
Source: PRISM Climate Group

Climate data for Leavitt Lake, California, 1991–2020 normals: 9617ft (2931m)
Month	Jan	Feb	Mar	Apr	May	Jun	Jul	Aug	Sep	Oct	Nov	Dec	Year
Record high °F (°C)	60 (16)	62 (17)	65 (18)	66 (19)	76 (24)	79 (26)	81 (27)	79 (26)	78 (26)	73 (23)	64 (18)	56 (13)	81 (27)
Mean maximum °F (°C)	51.1 (10.6)	50.8 (10.4)	54.4 (12.4)	58.4 (14.7)	64.5 (18.1)	70.7 (21.5)	74.9 (23.8)	73.5 (23.1)	69.9 (21.1)	64.4 (18.0)	57.0 (13.9)	49.2 (9.6)	76.1 (24.5)
Mean daily maximum °F (°C)	35.5 (1.9)	35.1 (1.7)	38.9 (3.8)	42.3 (5.7)	49.7 (9.8)	57.8 (14.3)	65.6 (18.7)	64.7 (18.2)	59.1 (15.1)	50.1 (10.1)	40.9 (4.9)	34.7 (1.5)	47.9 (8.8)
Daily mean °F (°C)	27.6 (−2.4)	26.6 (−3.0)	29.3 (−1.5)	32.0 (0.0)	39.5 (4.2)	47.7 (8.7)	55.8 (13.2)	55.2 (12.9)	49.5 (9.7)	40.9 (4.9)	32.9 (0.5)	27.0 (−2.8)	38.7 (3.7)
Mean daily minimum °F (°C)	19.6 (−6.9)	18.0 (−7.8)	19.7 (−6.8)	21.8 (−5.7)	29.3 (−1.5)	37.6 (3.1)	45.9 (7.7)	45.5 (7.5)	39.8 (4.3)	31.9 (−0.1)	24.8 (−4.0)	19.3 (−7.1)	29.4 (−1.4)
Mean minimum °F (°C)	1.4 (−17.0)	0.1 (−17.7)	3.2 (−16.0)	4.5 (−15.3)	13.1 (−10.5)	20.2 (−6.6)	35.2 (1.8)	34.7 (1.5)	24.1 (−4.4)	12.6 (−10.8)	5.5 (−14.7)	−0.6 (−18.1)	−5.7 (−20.9)
Record low °F (°C)	−16 (−27)	−6 (−21)	−8 (−22)	−8 (−22)	−1 (−18)	8 (−13)	19 (−7)	19 (−7)	12 (−11)	−2 (−19)	−5 (−21)	−11 (−24)	−16 (−27)
Average precipitation inches (mm)	9.49 (241)	9.30 (236)	8.26 (210)	4.45 (113)	2.71 (69)	0.82 (21)	0.87 (22)	0.53 (13)	0.95 (24)	3.31 (84)	5.73 (146)	9.17 (233)	55.59 (1,412)
Average extreme snow depth inches (cm)	105.8 (269)	130.8 (332)	155.3 (394)	154.0 (391)	129.0 (328)	82.3 (209)	28.4 (72)	0.4 (1.0)	1.0 (2.5)	6.5 (17)	32.1 (82)	66.9 (170)	166.3 (422)
Average precipitation days (≥ 0.01 in)	12.7	13.0	12.9	10.4	7.7	3.2	3.0	2.5	3.6	6.0	9.7	13.4	98.1
Source 1: XMACIS2 (snow depth 2006–2020)
Source 2: NOAA (Precipitation)

== See also ==
- Night Cap Peak

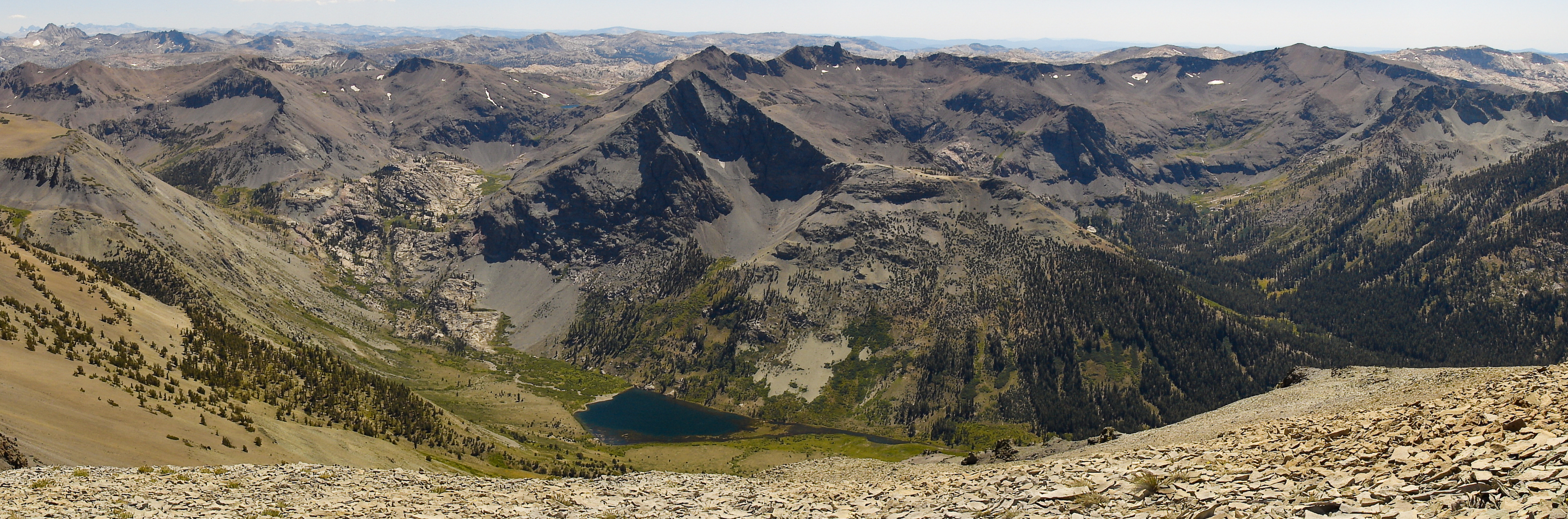
The view south from the summit of Leavitt Peak. Kennedy Peak and Kennedy Lake centered. Emigrant Wilderness, Eastern Sierra Nevada
