= Kennedy Peak (Tuolumne County, California) =

Mountain in Tuolumne County, California, U.S.

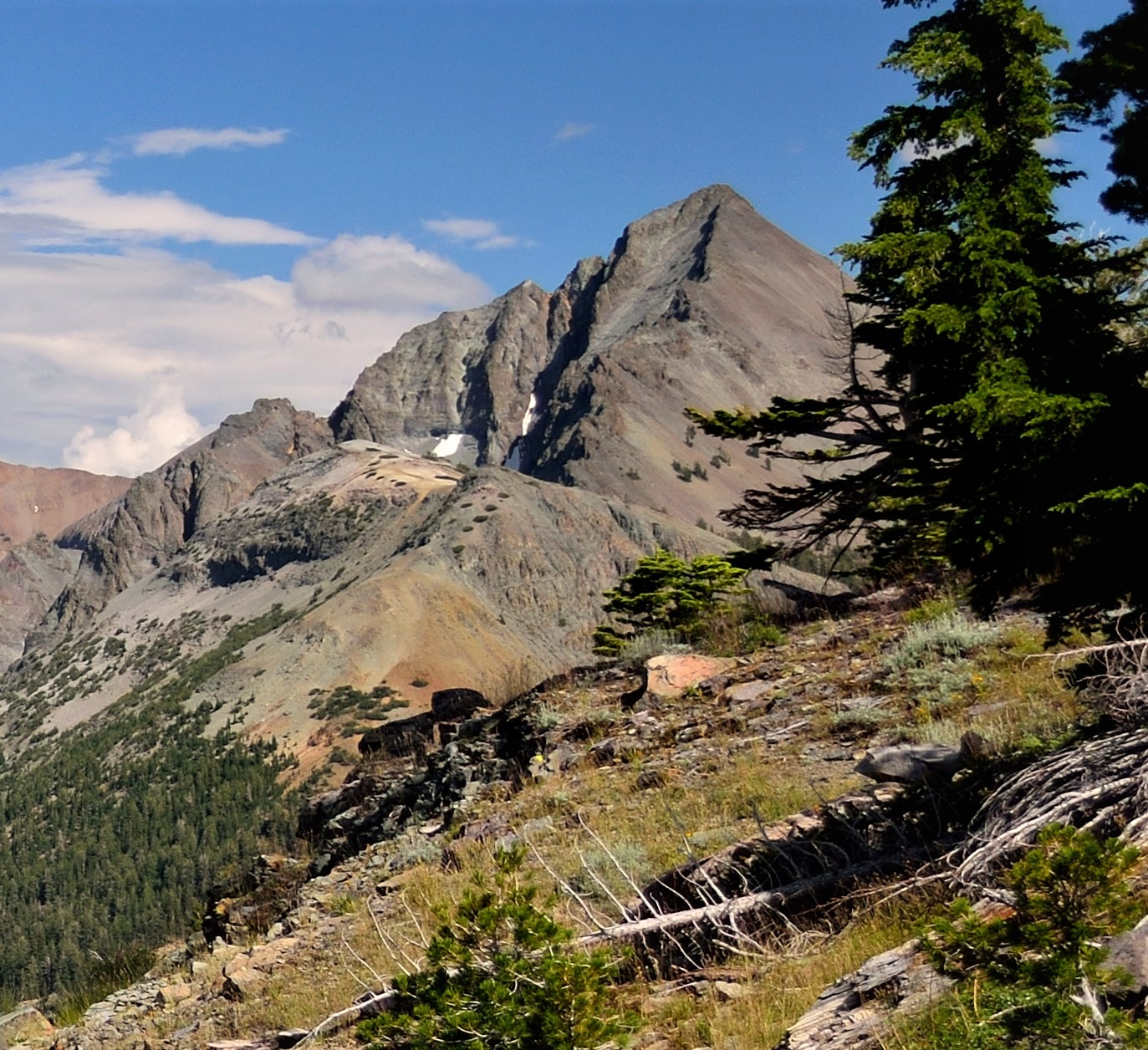
- Northwest aspect

Highest point
- Elevation: 10,718 ft (3,267 m)
- Prominence: 398 ft (121 m)
- Parent peak: Molo Mountain (10,875 ft)
- Isolation: 0.79 mi (1.27 km)
- Coordinates: 38°14′45″N 119°39′17″W

Naming
- Etymology: Andrew L. Kennedy

Geography
- Location within California Location within the United States
- Location: Emigrant Wilderness
- Country: United States of America
- State: California
- County: Tuolumne
- Parent range: Sierra Nevada
- Topo map: USGS Emigrant Lake

Kennedy Peak is a 10,718-foot-elevation (3,267-meter) mountain summit located in Tuolumne County, California, United States.

== Description ==
Kennedy Peak is set in the Emigrant Wilderness on land managed by Stanislaus National Forest. The peak is situated between Kennedy Canyon and Soda Canyon, approximately three miles south of Leavitt Peak, and 0.8 mile north of line parent Molo Mountain. Topographic relief is significant as the summit rises over 2,900 feet (880 meters) above Kennedy Lake in one mile. Precipitation runoff from this mountain drains into Kennedy Creek which is a tributary of the Stanislaus River.

== Etymology ==
The name of the peak, lake and creek refers to Andrew L. Kennedy, who on August 27, 1886, was granted a land patent for a strip of land for grazing purposes, which included Kennedy Lake. The toponym has been officially adopted by the U.S. Board on Geographic Names.

== Climate ==
According to the Köppen climate classification system, Kennedy Peak is located in an alpine climate zone. Most weather fronts originate in the Pacific Ocean, and travel east toward the Sierra Nevada mountains. As fronts approach, they are forced upward by the peaks (orographic lift), causing moisture in the form of rain or snowfall to drop onto the range.

== See also ==
- List of peaks named Kennedy
- Night Cap Peak

== Gallery ==
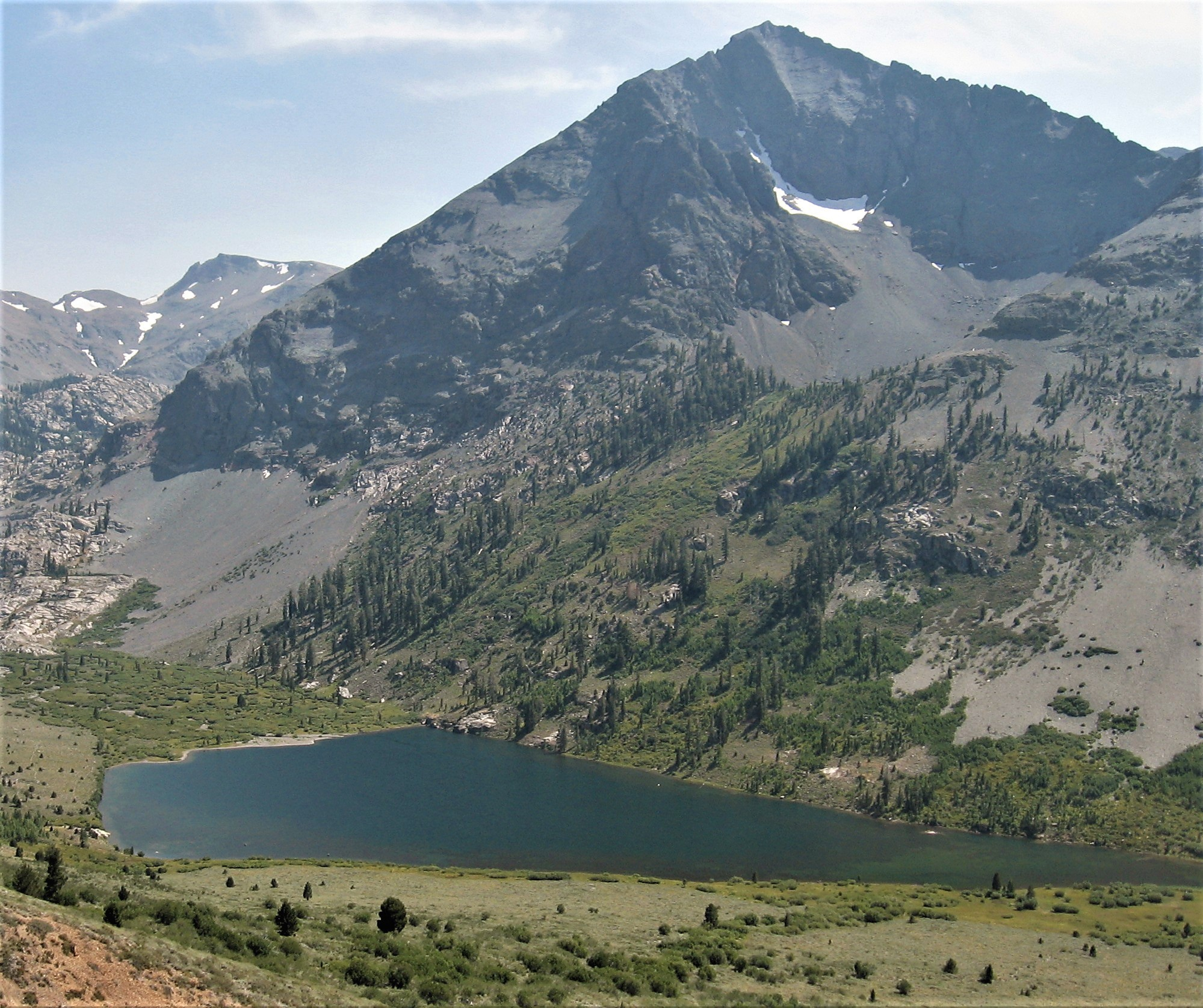
North aspect of Kennedy Peak rises above Kennedy Lake

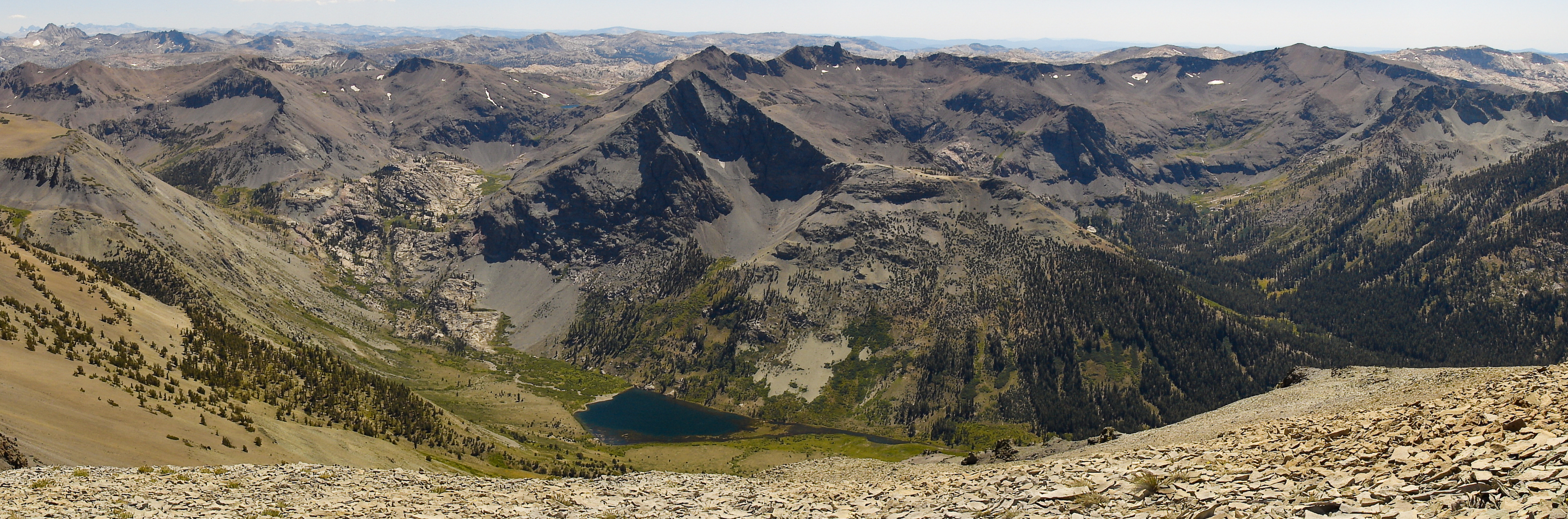
Kennedy Lake and north aspect of Kennedy Peak seen from Leavitt Peak

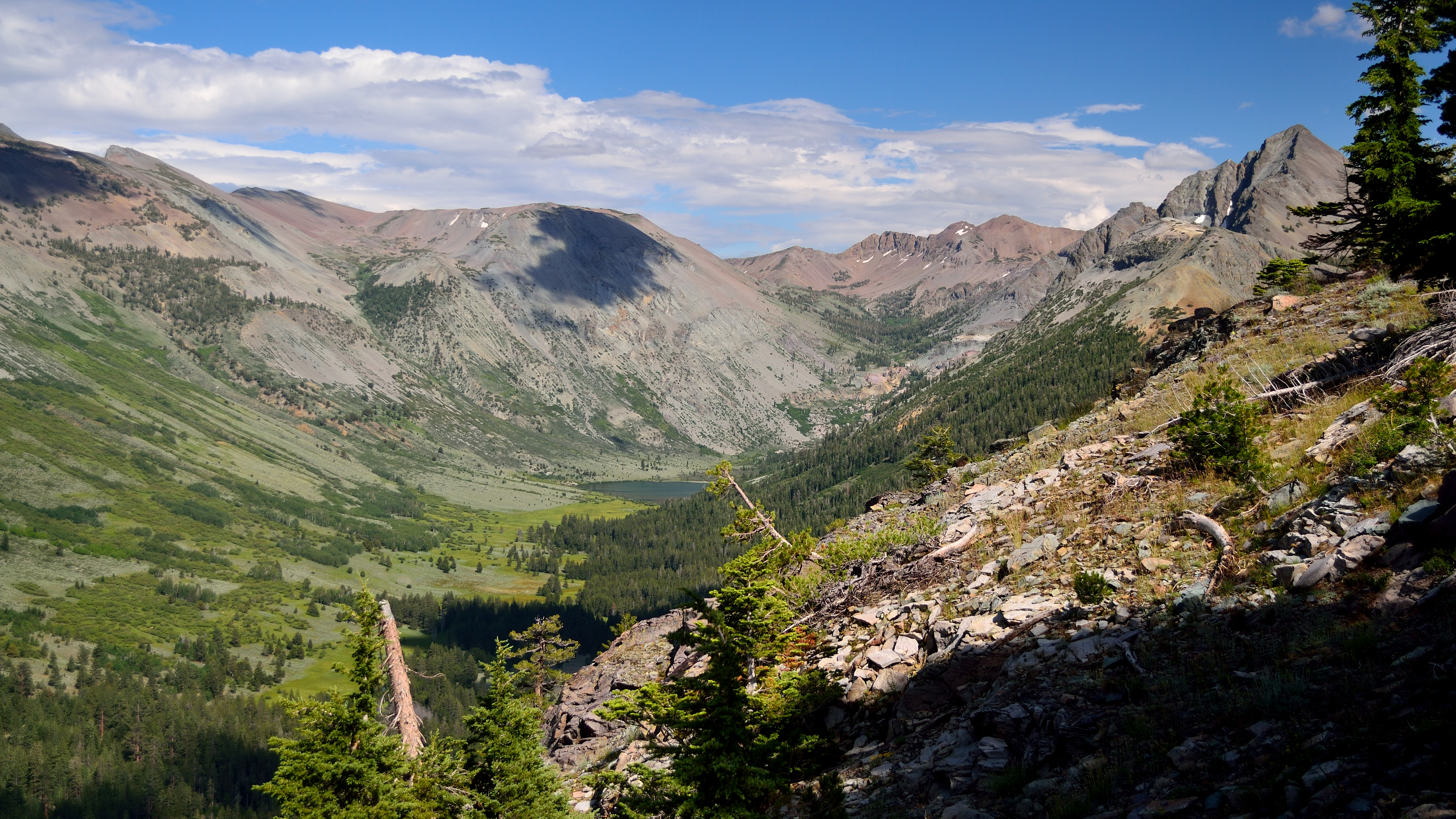
Upper Kennedy Canyon with Kennedy Peak in upper right
