= Hiram Leavitt =

Early settler, innkeeper, judge

Hiram L. Leavitt
- Born: Hiram Lewis Leavitt; 1824; Grantham, New Hampshire
- Died: 1901 (aged 76–77); Mono County, California
- Known for: Early settler, innkeeper, and judge

Hiram Leavitt (1824–1901) was an early settler, innkeeper, and judge in Mono County, California, in the eastern Sierra Nevada. Leavitt left his mark in the area and is the namesake of features such as Leavitt Peak, Leavitt Meadow, Leavitt Creek and Leavitt Lake.

== History ==
Bridgeport Inn on Highway 395 in California. The home was built for Hiram Leavitt, who arrived in the area in 1865.

Hiram Lewis Leavitt was born in Grantham, New Hampshire, on 2 April 1824. When he was in his late 20s, Leavitt responded to the news of the California Gold Rush and headed west to San Francisco. His wife Eliza and their infant daughter remained behind in Boston until November 1856, when he returned for them, collected their belongings, and made the sea voyage back to California. Following the end of the gold rush, the family travelled to the rugged Sierra Nevada of northeastern California. There, he built a home in what then was known as Indian Valley but today is called Bridgeport, a town not far from the Nevada border.

Many well-known explorers and pioneers passed through Bridgeport Valley and Mono County, including Jedediah Strong Smith, John C. Frémont, Kit Carson and others. Mono County was created by the California Legislature in 1861. Bridgeport is the seat of Mono County; its dominant architectural feature is the Victorian Bridgeport Courthouse, built in 1881, and it belies the New England origins of many of the county's early citizens, including Granite State native Leavitt.

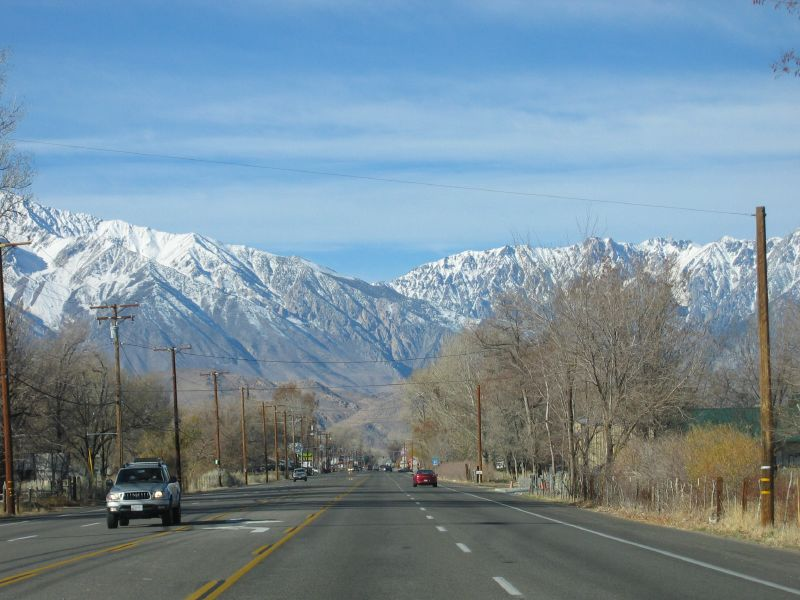
Mono County, California, eastern Sierra Nevada

Mono County's Bridgeport was a growing town, and Leavitt operated a stage stop business at what is called Leavitt Station, and later an inn. He also served as a judge. When it was determined in 1863 that Aurora, the county seat of Mono County, actually was located in Nevada rather than California, Bridgeport became the designated county seat of Mono County. In that same year, Leavitt built his hostelry at the east end of Sonora Pass to serve the growing traffic, primarily miners, traveling between Sonora and today's Aurora, Nevada.

By 1867 Leavitt was living in Sonora, California, and later moved to the road linking Sonora with Mono County.

At the end of the nineteenth century, Leavitt Peak, Leavitt Meadow, Leavitt Creek and Leavitt Lake appear on California maps. Hiram and his wife Eliza Leavitt continued to live in the family home – which he had hired builder Sam Hopkins to construct – until Hiram died in 1901 at age 77. (Builder Hopkins later married Leavitt's daughter Ida.) The old Leavitt House is today known as the Bridgeport Inn.

== See also ==
- Leavitt Peak
