= Lake Eleanor =

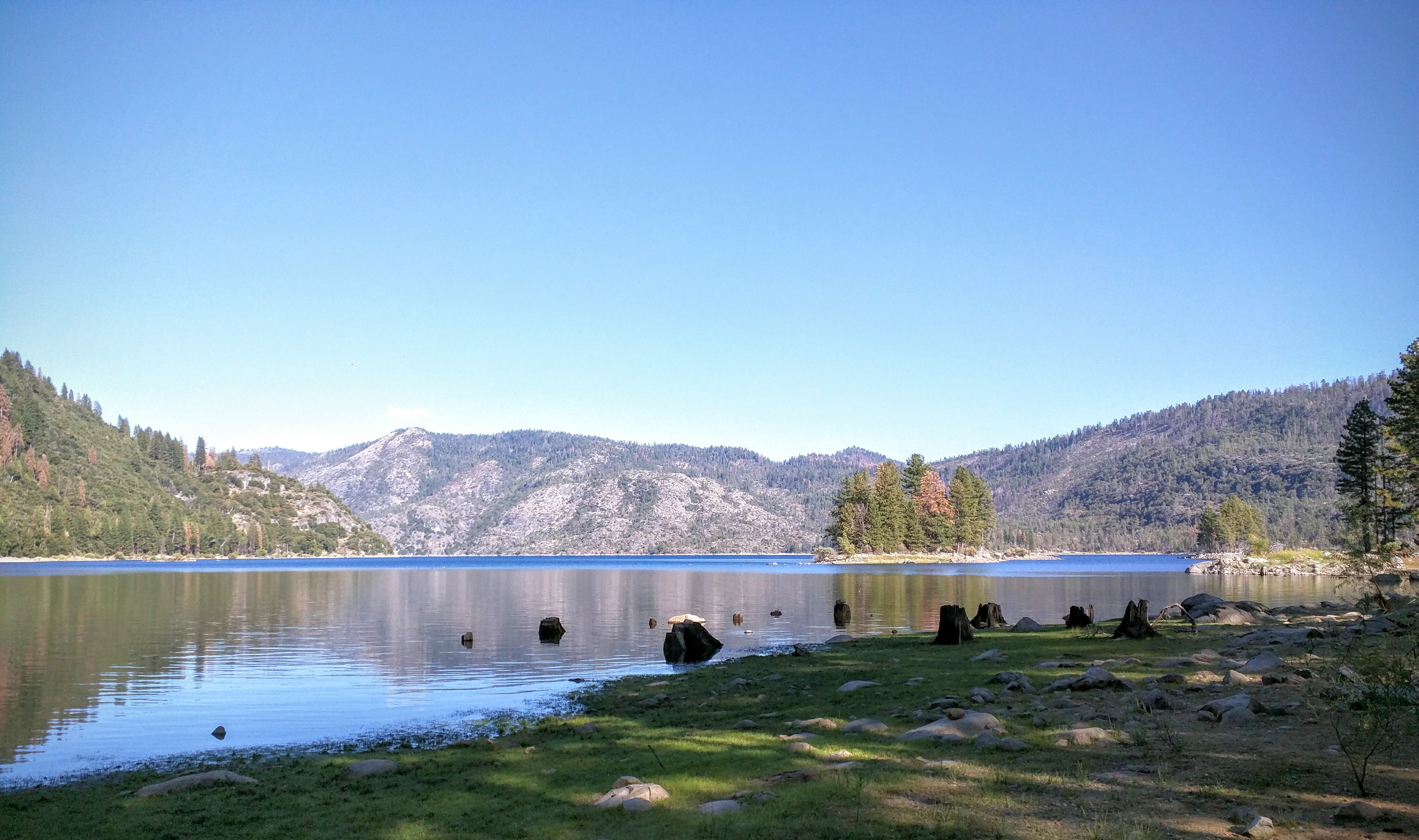
- Lake Eleanor's eastern shore in 2016, as viewed from a small peninsula

- Location within California Location within the United States
- Location: Yosemite National Park, Tuolumne County, California, United States
- Coordinates: 37°58′41″N 119°52′45″W
- Type: reservoir
- Primary inflows: Eleanor Creek
- Basin countries: United States
- Surface area: 953 acres (3.9 km^{2})
- Water volume: 26,100 acre-feet (0 km^{3})
- Surface elevation: 4,657 feet (1,419 m)

Lake Eleanor is a reservoir located in the northwestern backcountry of Yosemite National Park at an altitude of 4,657 feet (1,419 m). The reservoir has a capacity of 26,100 acre-feet (32,200,000 m^{3}) and a surface area of 953 acres (3.9 km^{2}).

== Geography ==
The reservoir is situated in a glacier carved valley at an elevation of 4,600–4,700 feet (1,400–1,400 m). Prior to flooding, a smaller lake of approximately 1.5 by 0.5 miles (2.41 km × 0.80 km) and 200 feet (61 m) deep existed in the valley. The lake was fed by three streams, Kibbie Creek, Eleanor Creek, and Frog Creek. Before being clearcut, the valley floor was moderately to densely forested with a yellow pine forest consisting primarily of Jeffrey and ponderosa pines, with scatterings of incense cedar, white fir, and black oak. Manzanita and other shrub species made up the understory, and willow and other wetland species existed in the marshy areas around the lake and streams.

== History ==
An archeological survey done of the valley in 1985 while the reservoir was drained for maintenance provided evidence of prehistoric occupation of the valley. Due to the limited time of the study and the nature of working in the sediment of a reservoir, the extent of occupation was unable to be assessed.

Settlement of Lake Eleanor valley by Europeans began in the mid-1800s. In the late 1800s, two homestead patents were taken out in the valley, one by Hermann Wolfe on the south shore and another by Horace J. Kibbe on the north shore, which he occupied until 1913.

== Dam construction ==
The current lake was formed in 1918 by damming Eleanor Creek as part of the Hetch Hetchy Reservoir system, constructed to supply water and power to the city of San Francisco. The original smaller, natural lake was also named "Eleanor" after the daughter of Josiah Whitney, leader of the California Geological Survey in the 1860s.

Lake Eleanor Dam (National ID # CA00121) stands as a concrete multiple arch dam with a height of 68 feet (21 m) and a length of 1,260 feet (380 m). This first stage of the Hetch Hetchy project was built for year-round hydroelectric power generation, which was then sold to help finance construction of the larger O'Shaughnessy Dam, completed in 1923.

That dams were planned for a valley in Yosemite National Park caused significant opposition. One of the most potent opponents was the Sierra Club and its founding President, John Muir. After two vetoes by Theodore Roosevelt, on December 19, 1913, Woodrow Wilson signed the Raker Act permitting construction. It began in 1914.

The remote location dictated the use of an unusual multiple-arch structure here. It dramatically minimized the amount of concrete used in comparison with a gravity dam. Even more unusual, the concrete arches were elliptical rather than circular, the only multiple-arch dam ever built this way. Chief designer for the San Francisco Board of Public Works Michael O'Shaughnessy and hydraulic structural engineer R.P. McIntosh were primarily responsible for the design.

Still owned and operated by the city of San Francisco, the lake now provides opportunities for angling, hiking, and camping.

== Climate ==
Climate data for Eleanor Lake, California
Month	Jan	Feb	Mar	Apr	May	Jun	Jul	Aug	Sep	Oct	Nov	Dec	Year
Record high °F (°C)	75 (24)	73 (23)	79 (26)	83 (28)	87 (31)	99 (37)	101 (38)	103 (39)	98 (37)	92 (33)	80 (27)	77 (25)	103 (39)
Mean daily maximum °F (°C)	47.1 (8.4)	49.1 (9.5)	53.5 (11.9)	59.5 (15.3)	66.2 (19.0)	75.0 (23.9)	85.3 (29.6)	85.4 (29.7)	79.4 (26.3)	68.0 (20.0)	57.9 (14.4)	49.7 (9.8)	64.7 (18.2)
Daily mean °F (°C)	36.3 (2.4)	38.1 (3.4)	41.7 (5.4)	47.7 (8.7)	54.1 (12.3)	61.7 (16.5)	71.0 (21.7)	70.3 (21.3)	64.3 (17.9)	54.0 (12.2)	45.2 (7.3)	38.9 (3.8)	51.9 (11.1)
Mean daily minimum °F (°C)	25.4 (−3.7)	27.3 (−2.6)	30.0 (−1.1)	36.0 (2.2)	41.9 (5.5)	48.4 (9.1)	56.7 (13.7)	55.1 (12.8)	49.1 (9.5)	40.1 (4.5)	32.4 (0.2)	28.1 (−2.2)	39.2 (4.0)
Record low °F (°C)	−7 (−22)	−12 (−24)	1 (−17)	13 (−11)	22 (−6)	24 (−4)	35 (2)	34 (1)	29 (−2)	20 (−7)	10 (−12)	−2 (−19)	−12 (−24)
Average precipitation inches (mm)	7.71 (196)	7.16 (182)	5.93 (151)	3.50 (89)	1.91 (49)	0.71 (18)	0.09 (2.3)	0.09 (2.3)	0.51 (13)	2.27 (58)	4.17 (106)	7.45 (189)	41.5 (1,055.6)
Average snowfall inches (cm)	30.3 (77)	26.2 (67)	32.2 (82)	10.2 (26)	1.6 (4.1)	0.1 (0.25)	0.0 (0.0)	0.0 (0.0)	0.1 (0.25)	1.5 (3.8)	6.7 (17)	24.1 (61)	133 (338.4)
Average precipitation days (≥ 0.01 in)	10	10	10	8	7	3	1	1	2	5	6	9	72
Source: Western Regional Climate Center

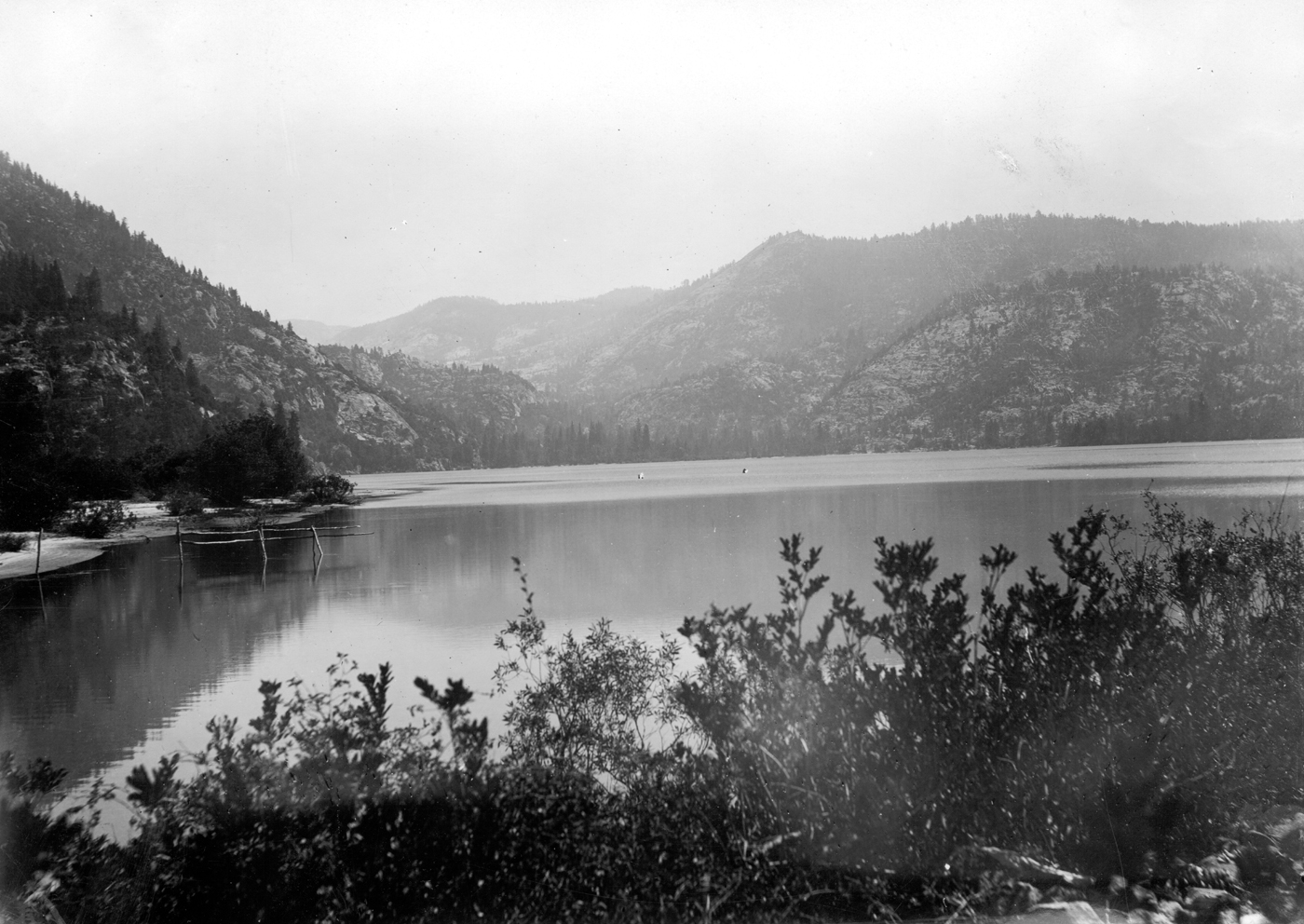
Lake Eleanor in 1896, viewed from the tram near its outlet, looking northeast.

== See also ==
- List of lakes in California
