= Emigrant Wilderness =

Protected wilderness area in California, United States

- IUCN category Ib (wilderness area)
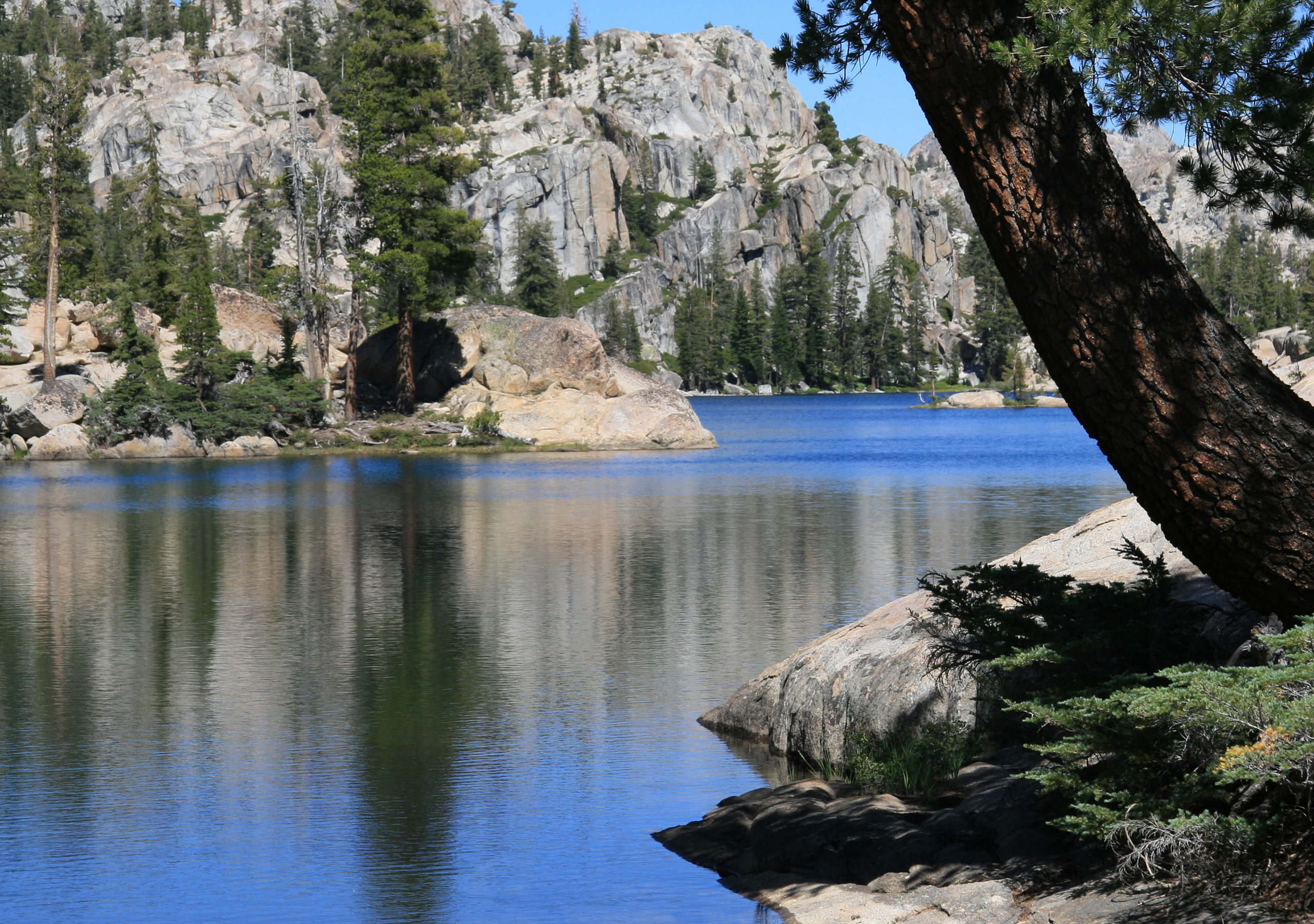
- Lake Lertora, Emigrant Wilderness

- Location within California Location within the United States
- Interactive map of Emigrant Wilderness
- Location: Tuolumne County, California, United States
- Nearest city: Merced, CA
- Coordinates: 38°11′07″N 119°45′53″W
- Area: 112,277 acres (454.37 km^{2})
- Established: January 1, 1974
- Governing body: U.S. Forest Service

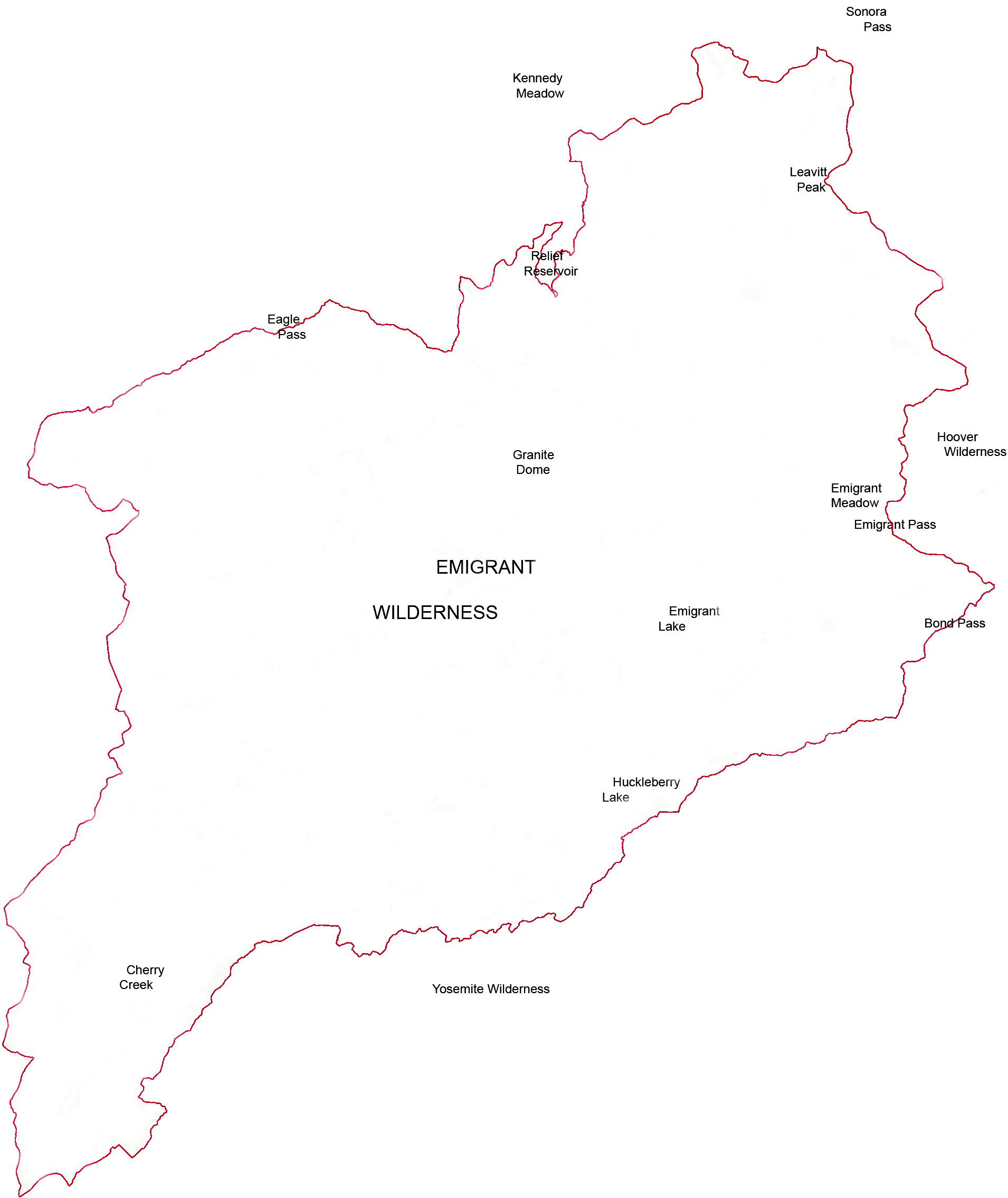
Emigrant Wilderness outline map

The Emigrant Wilderness of Stanislaus National Forest is a formally designated wilderness area in the Sierra Nevada. It is bordered by Yosemite National Park on the south, the Toiyabe National Forest and the Hoover Wilderness on the east, and State Route 108 over Sonora Pass on the north. It is an elongated area that extends northeast about 25 miles (40 km) in length and up to 15 miles (24 km) in width. Watersheds drain to the Stanislaus and Tuolumne Rivers. The Emigrant Wilderness area, which is a glaciated landscape, is entirely within Tuolumne County, California and is approximately 140 miles (230 km) east of San Francisco, California and 50 miles (80 km) south of Lake Tahoe.

The northeastern third of the Wilderness is dominated by volcanic ridges and peaks; the remaining areas consist of many sparsely vegetated, and granitic ridges interspersed with meadows. The area also has “100 named lakes and over 500 small, unnamed lakes,” according to a future case, High Sierra Hikers v. U. S. Forest Service. Elevations range from below 5,000 feet (1,500 m) near Cherry Reservoir to 11,570 feet (3,527 m) at Leavitt Peak, but the elevation range of most of the popular areas is 7,500 to 9,000 feet (2,300 to 2,700 m). Precipitation averages 50 inches (1,300 mm) annually, 80% of it in the form of snow. Snowpacks typically linger into June, sometimes later following very wet winters. Summers are generally dry and mild, but afternoon thundershowers occur periodically and nighttime temperatures could dip below freezing anytime.

== History ==
Various native peoples occupied this area for 10,000 years, spending the summer and early autumn hunting in the high country and trading with groups from the eastern side of the Sierra Nevada. The most recent groups were the Sierra Miwok of the western slope and Paiute of the Great Basin.

Following the discovery of gold in 1848, large numbers of miners and settlers came to the Sierra and the native cultures quickly declined. In September–October 1852, the Clark-Skidmore party became the first emigrant group to travel the West Walker route over Emigrant Pass, continuing through a portion of the present-day Emigrant Wilderness. Several more emigrant parties were enticed by officials from Sonora to use this route in 1853, but it was a very difficult passage with many hardships and was soon abandoned. Relief Valley and Relief Reservoir were so named because of the assistance some emigrants received there from residents of the Sonora area.

In 1931, the United States Forest Service designated this area for primitive management as the Emigrant Basin Primitive Area. On January 4, 1975, the Emigrant Basin Primitive Area was designated as the Emigrant Wilderness which was a total of 106,988 acres, at that time. In 1984, an additional 6,100 acres were added to the Emigrant Wilderness boundaries.

== Dam controversy ==
At the time the Emigrant Wilderness was designated through law, there were already eighteen different dams presiding within the wilderness boundaries. Most of the dams had been constructed to help boost the habitats for fish that had been introduced by stockmen. Before the dams, the lakes had been absent of fish due to the high altitudes. In 1975, when the land was designated, Congress did not mention the dams in the legislature, despite knowing about them. Due to lack of recognition in the initial designation, there have been many objections and concerns since. There was no included explanation of any exception from the Wilderness Act, and so, many people have objected to the dams being restored because of the aforementioned 1964 act. In 2006, High Sierra Hikers v. U. S. Forest Service went to court–a case regarding environmental concerns over many situations beyond the dams of the Emigrant Wilderness–and it was ruled that the dams would be left as is, with no maintenance or upkeep, and naturally decay over time to keep in accordance with the Wilderness Act.

== Recreation ==
Recreation activities include: backpacking, fishing, horse riding, and camping. To view rules and availability about certain sites or opportunities, the official United States Forest Service website can provide further clarification.

From Sonora Pass in the north, the Pacific Crest Trail follows a scenic route at the east edge of the Emigrant Wilderness along the high ridge past Leavitt Peak, turns further east from Kennedy Canyon to Bond Pass, and then heads south down Jack Main Canyon.
Many other trails criss-cross the Emigrant Wilderness, from Leavitt Meadow on the East side, Kennedy Meadow on the West side, and other trailheads. Highlights include cliffs in the Granite Dome area and lakes such as Emigrant Lake, Huckleberry Lake, and Lake Lertora.

Regarding certain rules, it is “bordered by Yosemite National Park on the south,the Humboldt-Toiyabe National Forest on the east, and State Highway 108 on the north,” and so beware of crossing between the territories if you are unsure about something you are carrying or have. Dogs are permitted in the wilderness area on leash, but if you venture into Yosemite they are strictly prohibited.

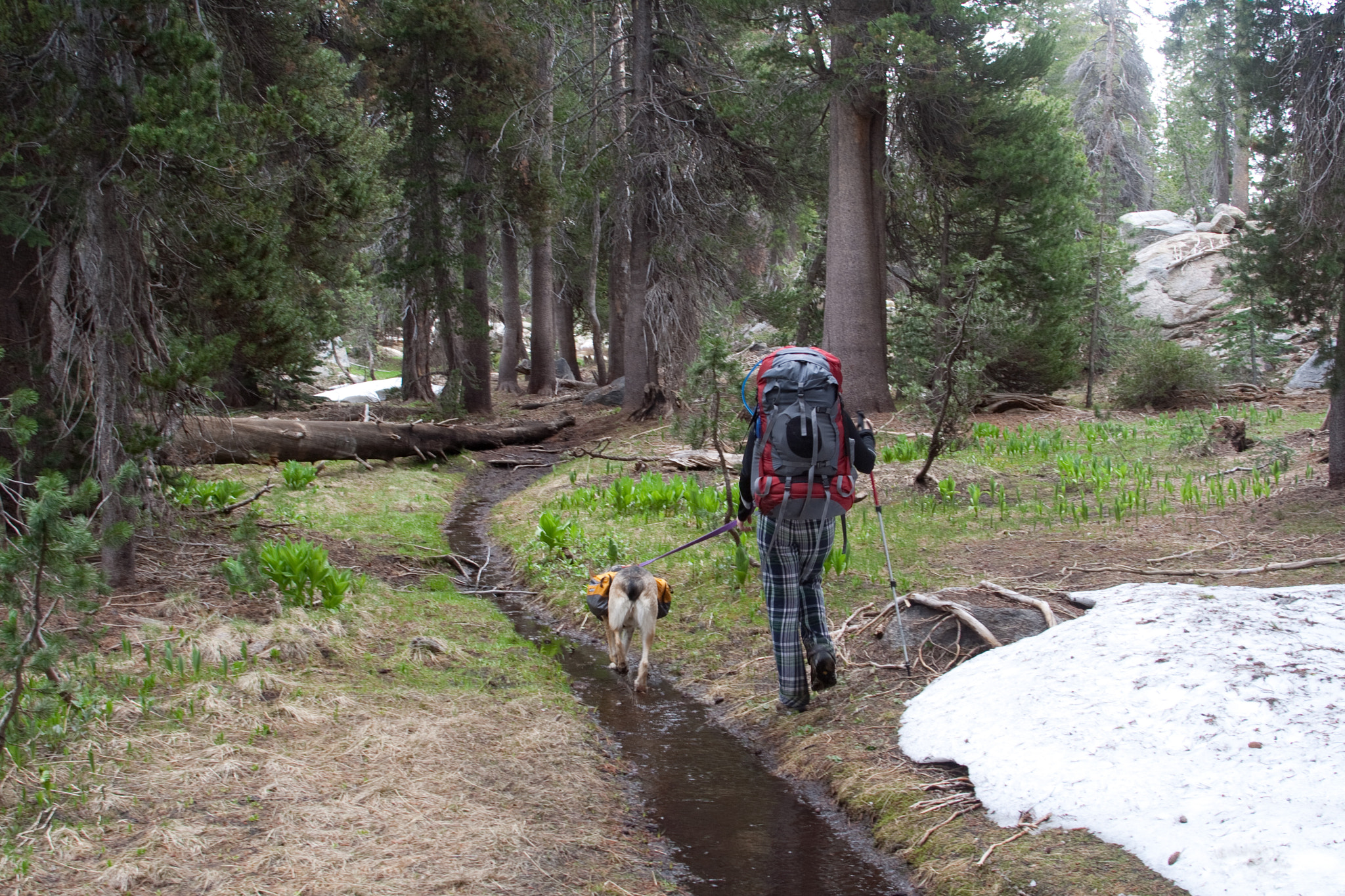
Hiking June 2009
