= Cal Poly =

Cal Poly may refer to:

- California Polytechnic State University, San Luis Obispo
- California State Polytechnic University, Humboldt
- California State Polytechnic University, Pomona

== See also ==
- Cal Poly athletics (disambiguation)
- Cal Poly College of Architecture and Environmental Design (disambiguation)
- Cal Poly College of Engineering (disambiguation)
- Cal Poly College of Environmental Design (disambiguation)
