= Cal Poly San Luis Obispo College of Engineering =

Engineering college in California, US

Coordinates: 35.303°N 120.665°W

- The Engineering IV Building
- Motto: Discere Faciendo / Learn By Doing
- Type: Public
- Dean: Amy Fleischer
- Faculty: 247 (2018 Fall)
- Students: 6,462 (2024 Fall)
- Undergraduates: 6,165 (2024 Fall)
- Postgraduates: 297 (2024 Fall)
- Location: San Luis Obispo, California, United States
- Campus: Suburban
- Website: www.ceng.calpoly.edu

The Cal Poly San Luis Obispo College of Engineering is the engineering college of the California Polytechnic State University, San Luis Obispo in San Luis Obispo, California. It has nearly 250 faculty members and more than 6,000 students enrolled in 14 bachelor's and in 11 master's degree programs through nine engineering departments. Its facilities house more than 80 classrooms, laboratories, and work spaces occupying more than 160,000 square feet. In the 2021 U.S. News & World Report's "America's Best Colleges" edition, the College of Engineering is ranked 8th out of 220 public and private undergraduate engineering schools in the U.S. where doctorates are not offered.

The College is divided into 10 departments, each for a different engineering discipline. These disciplines are Aerospace, Civil/Environmental, Computer, Software, Electrical, Biomedical, Industrial/Manufacturing, Materials, and Mechanical, with another department covering General engineering. Some of the major programs in the College host specialization tracks based on certain fields within the engineering discipline.

== General information ==
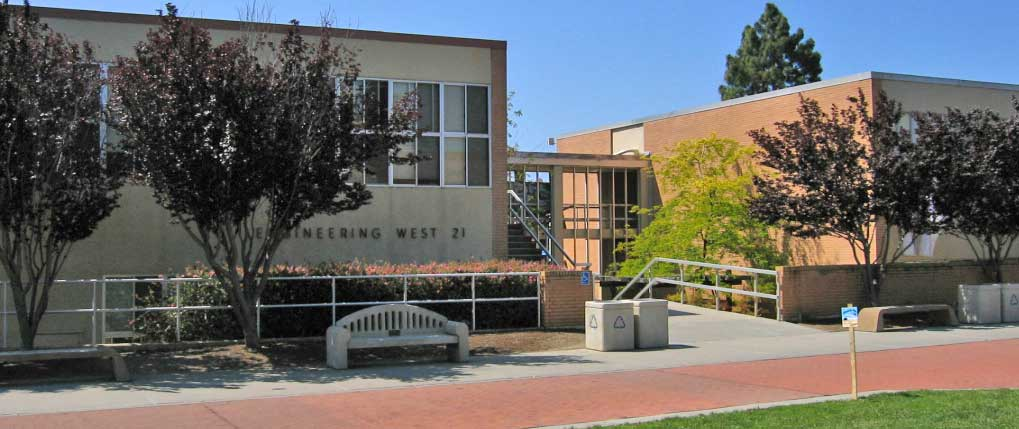
The Engineering West Building

The College of Engineering is the largest of Cal Poly's six colleges, with 6,091 students (5,829 undergraduate and 262 graduate students), or 28.7%, of the 21,242 enrolled at the university in Fall 2019. For engineering freshmen entering Fall 2020, Cal Poly accepted 31.01% of applicants (5,436 accepted/17,531 applied); admitted freshmen had an average GPA of 4.16, with the middle 50% range of ACT composite scores 29-34 and 1350-1520 for the SAT composite score (out of 1600). Cal Poly San Luis Obispo offers 4+1 Master (5-year) programs for some engineering majors. The College of Engineering has almost 80 student clubs which offer project, leadership, service, conference and competition opportunities. According to the college, 90% of graduates are employed or enrolled in graduate school within a year after graduation.

== Departments ==
=== Aerospace Engineering (AERO) ===
The Aerospace Engineering program was ranked by U.S. News & World Report's 2021 "America's Best Colleges" report as 2nd overall (of the 5 programs ranked in engineering schools whose highest degree is a Master's). The department offers concentrations in Aeronautics, focusing on the design and performance of aircraft, and Astronautics, focusing on space systems and the orbital environment.

=== Civil and Environmental Engineering (CE & ENVE) ===
The Bachelor of Science degree program stresses the team design concept and systems approach to problem solving and is accredited by the Engineering Accreditation Commission of the Accreditation Board for Engineering and Technology (ABET).

The Civil Engineering program was ranked by U.S. News & World Report's 2021 "America's Best Colleges" report as 2nd overall (of the 19 programs ranked in engineering schools whose highest degree is a Master's).

Civil Engineering offers courses specializing in

- Geotechnical
- Structural
- Transportation
- Water Resources
- Construction

Environmental Engineering offers courses specializing in:

- Air Pollution Control
- Water and Wastewater Treatment Design
- Hazardous Waste Management
- Solid Waste Management
- Industrial Pollution Prevention

Prior to 1977, there was no Civil Engineering Department. The Transportation Engineering Department offered civil engineering courses as well as courses in transportation engineering. The Environmental Engineering Department began in 1969, but when Warren Baker was hired as president of the university, in 1979, he combined the Environmental Engineering and Transportation Engineering departments into the Civil & Environmental Engineering Department.

The Civil and Environmental Engineering Department also includes the 2008, 2009, 2010 Robert Ridgway Award-winning Society of Civil Engineers (student chapter of the American Society of Civil Engineers) and the American Society of Civil Engineers 2010, 2011 and 2012 National Concrete Canoe Competition champions. The Society of Environmental Engineers placed 2nd for best chapter in AWMA in 2009. The Chi Epsilon Honors Society chapter won the inaugural Chi Epsilon (Pacific District) Cup, and is now ranked as the #1 chapter in California and Hawaii.

The Civil Engineering program was ranked by U.S. News & World Report's 2020 "America's Best Colleges" report as 3rd overall (of 11 programs in engineering schools whose highest degree is a Master's).

Clubs/Organizations Affiliated with the Department:

- American Society of Civil Engineers (ASCE) Student Chapter
- Society of Environmental Engineers (SENVE)
- Engineers Without Borders (EWB) - Cal Poly
- Institute of Transportation Engineers (ITE)
- Cal Poly RainWorks
- Cal Poly Biodiesel Project

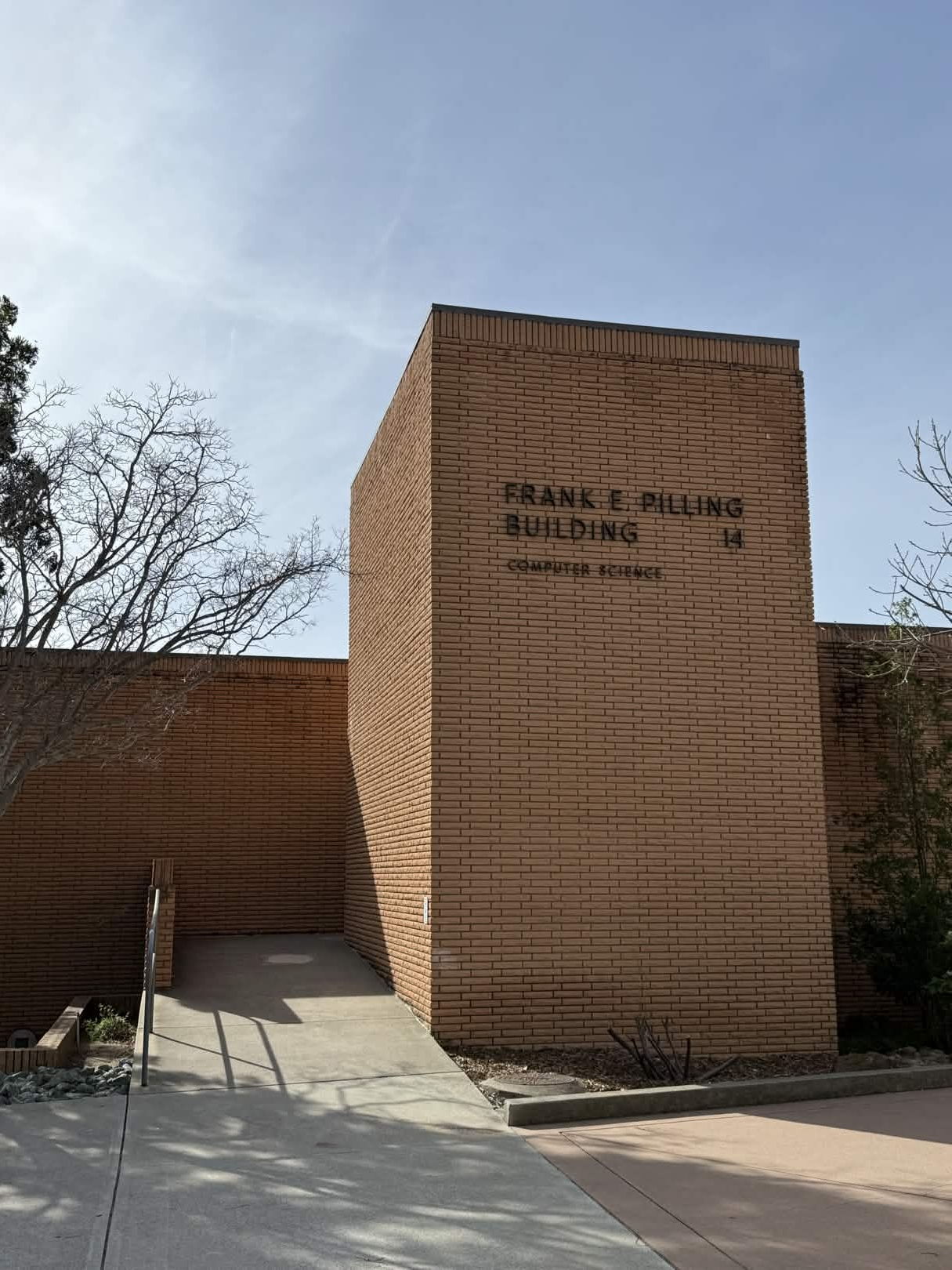
Southeast Entrance to Pilling Comp Sci (Bldg. 14), which hosts the CSC/CPE Departments

=== Computer Engineering (CPE) ===
The Computer Engineering major is an interdisciplinary program resting on the foundations of two departments: Computer Science and Electrical Engineering, and it is fully accredited by ABET.

The Computer Engineering program was ranked by U.S. News & World Report's 2021 "America's Best Colleges" report as 2nd overall (of the 21 programs ranked in engineering schools whose highest degree is a Master's).

=== Computer Science and Software Engineering (CSC) ===
The department offers Bachelor of Science and Master of Science programs accredited by the ABET. B.S. degrees are available in Computer Science, Software Engineering and Computer Engineering; an M.S. degree is available in Computer Science. The Software Engineering major began in Fall 2003 as the first undergraduate software engineering major in California.

The department offers 5 Concentrations:

- AI & Machine Learning
- Data Engineering
- Game Design
- Graphics
- Privacy & Security

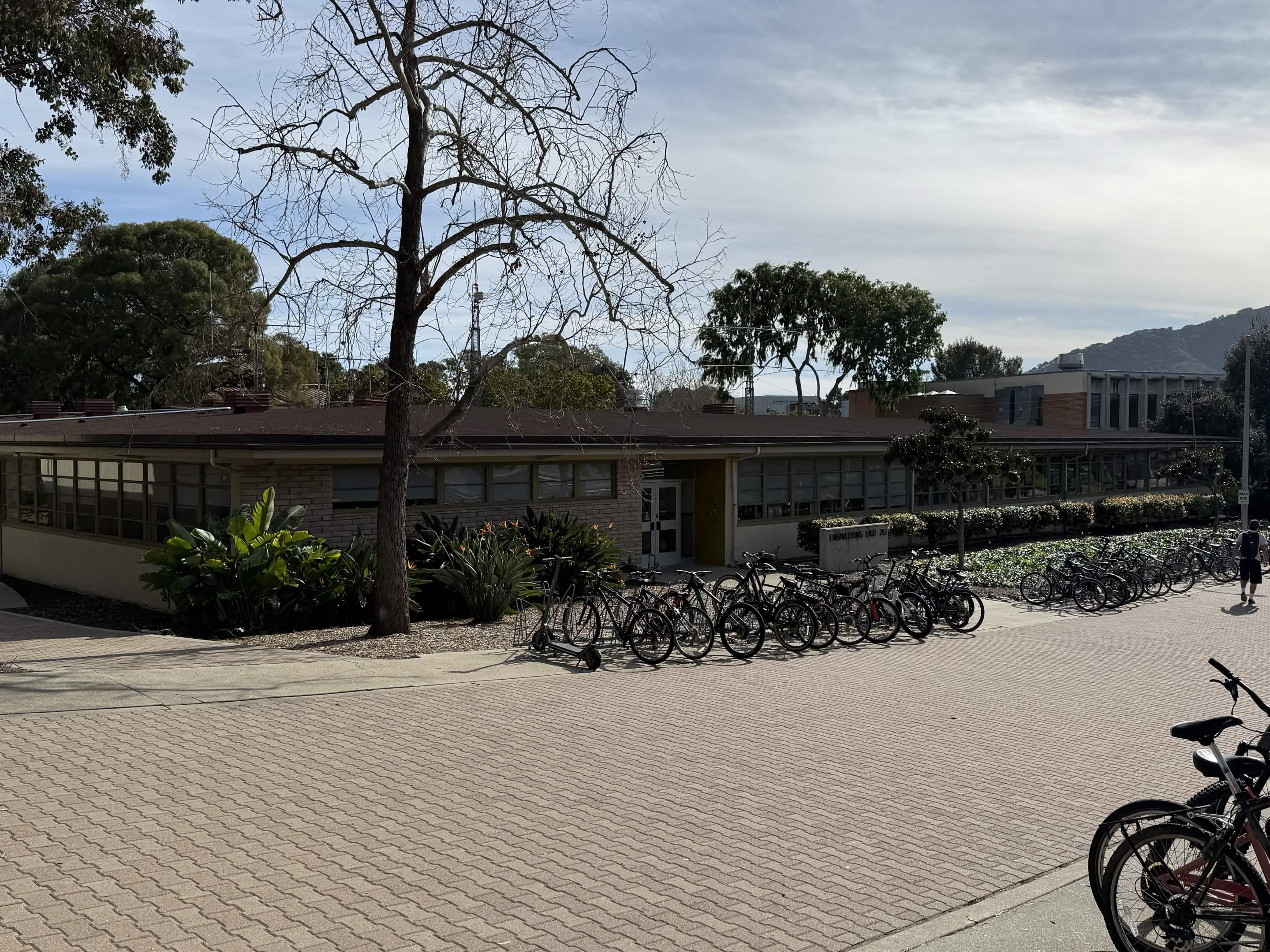
North side entrance to the "Big E" Engineering East building (Bldg. 20), home of the EE department.

=== Electrical Engineering (EE) ===
The Electrical Engineering Department offers Bachelor of Science and Master of Science programs in electrical engineering, which are accredited by the ABET. The department supports interdisciplinary programs such as Computer Engineering and many graduate as well as undergraduate students are served by the department.

Specializations:

- Communications
- Computers
- Electronics
- Controls
- Power
- Radio Frequency/Microwave/Photonics

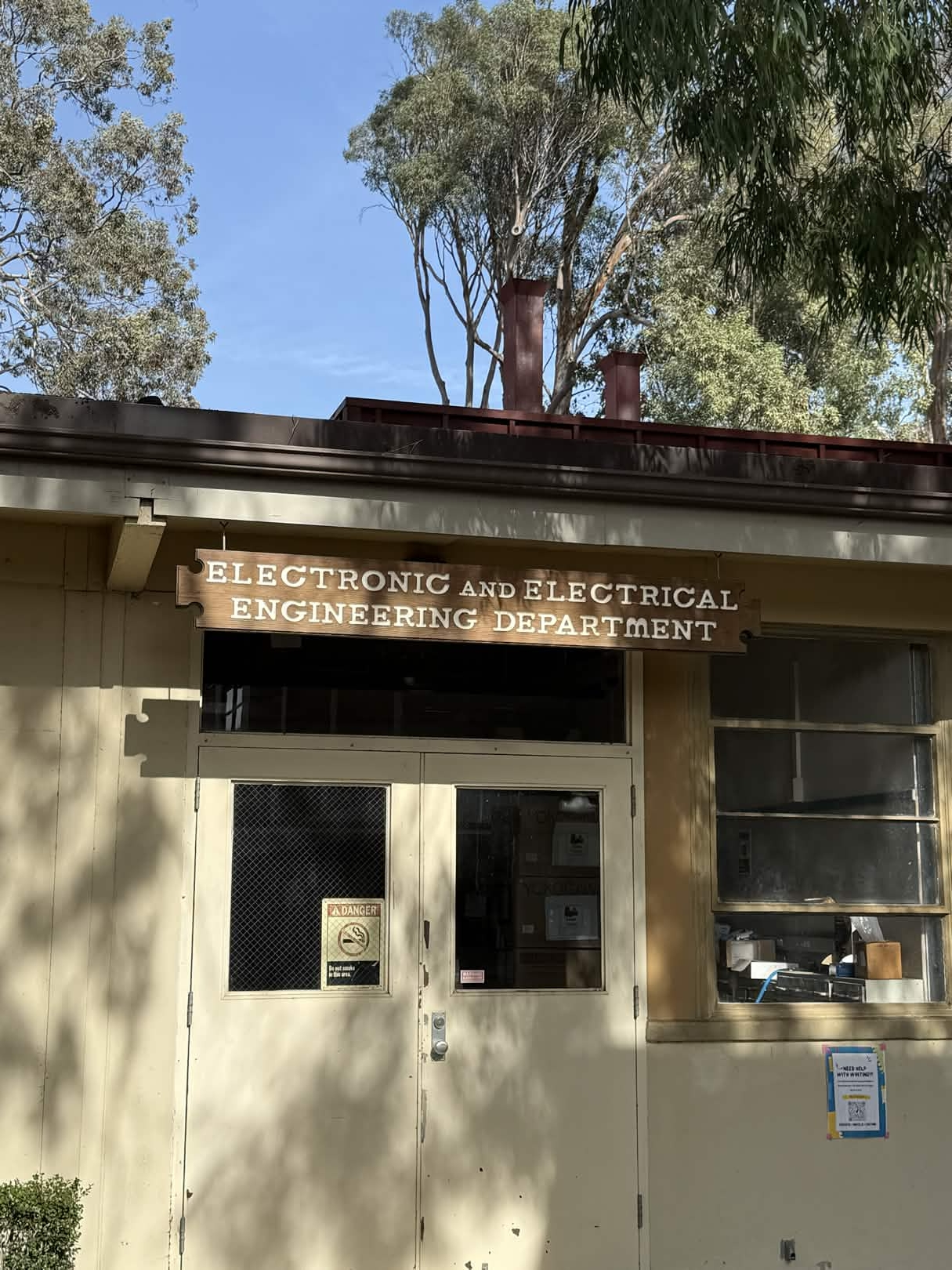
Sign still using separate EE/EL markings.

The EE program began as a collection of courses training students in the working of steam & electrical machinery. Its earliest courses and equipment were held in the Power House (Building 76), the oldest building still standing at Cal Poly. It supplied electrical power to the rest of the school's shops and was operated by students. Under school president Julian A. McPhee, the courses were consolidated into the Electronic and Radio Engineering (EL&R) Department and a 4-year course beginning in 1946. The EE and EL (Electronic Engineering) department moved into Building 20, Engineering East, in 1957, and has been their home since. Located centrally to the campus, it provides numerous lab spaces for the department. Much of the equipment from the 1957 move-in is still used today.

The EL and EE departments merged in 1971, streamlining coursework needed to train students. The 1980s saw the collaboration of the EE and CSC departments to develop the CPE coursework, with the first CPE B.S. awarded in 1988. Separation of the EE and EL programs ended during Dr. Saul Goldberg's 1992-1995 tenure as department chair, with the department consolidating under the "Electrical Engineering" name.

The Electrical Engineering program was ranked by U.S. News & World Report's 2021 "America's Best Colleges" report (includes both private and public universities) as 2nd overall (of the 23 programs in engineering schools whose highest degree is a Master's).

=== General and Biomedical Engineering (BMED) ===
In the past, Biomedical Engineering was a concentration within the general engineering major. In 2005, the program was implemented with its own stand-alone curriculum.

Specializations:

- Biochemical Engineering
- Bioengineering
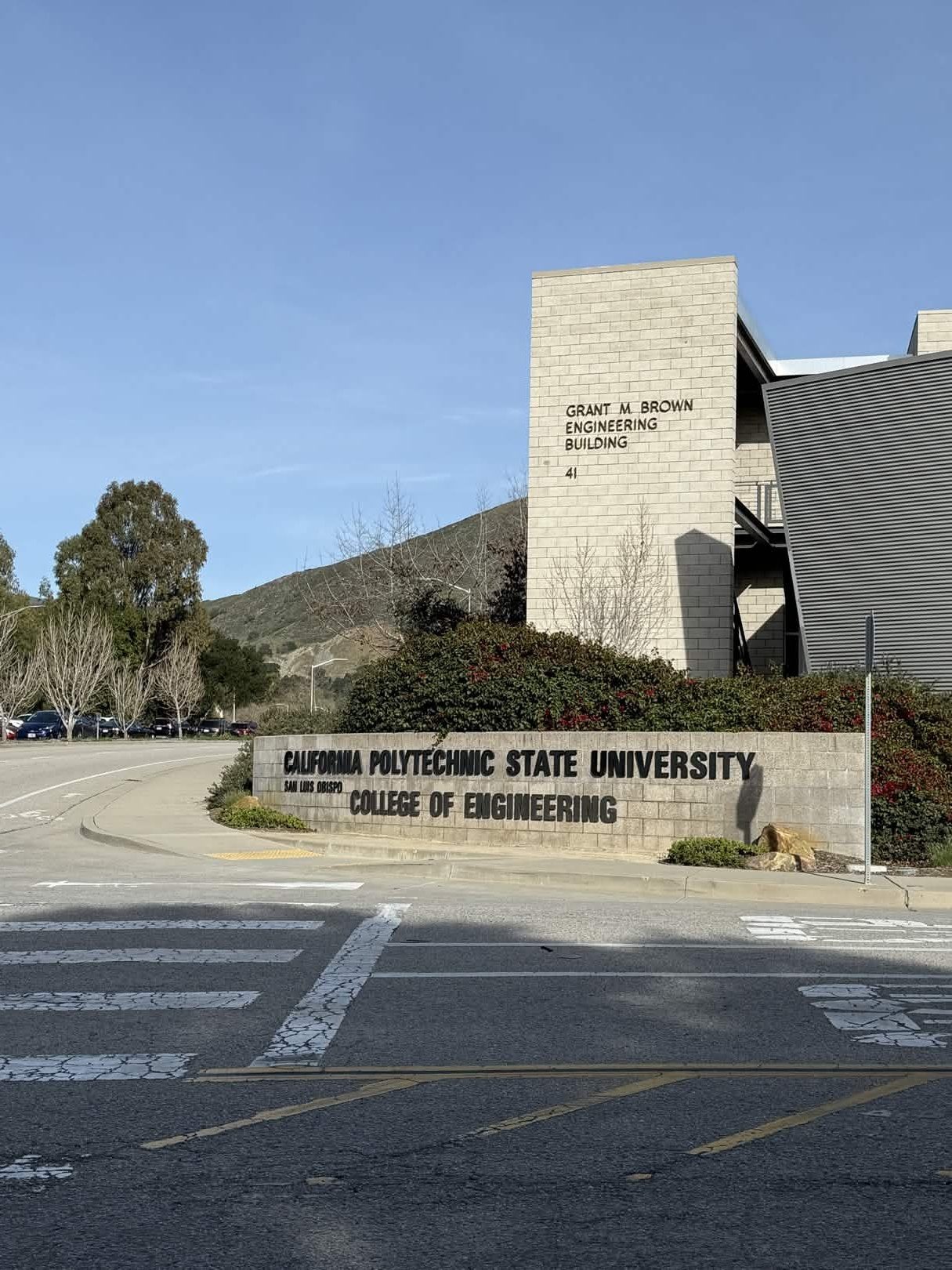
- Grant M. Brown Engineering (Bldg. 41), from the corner of Highland Ave. and California Blvd. at the northwest corner of campus. The first floor houses IME lab space and the second belongs to the MATE department.
  Biomedical Engineering
- Integrated Technology Management
- Materials Engineering
- Water Engineering

Clubs/Organizations Affiliated with the Department:

- Medical Design
- Biomedical Engineering Society

=== Industrial and Manufacturing Engineering (IME) ===
The program was established in 1956, the Industrial and Manufacturing Engineering Department trains students to design, install, and improve systems that integrate people, technology, materials, and information.

Degrees offered:

- B.S. Industrial Engineering
- B.S. Manufacturing Engineering
- M.S. Industrial Engineering
- 5 Year B.S.+M.S. Industrial Engineering Blended Program

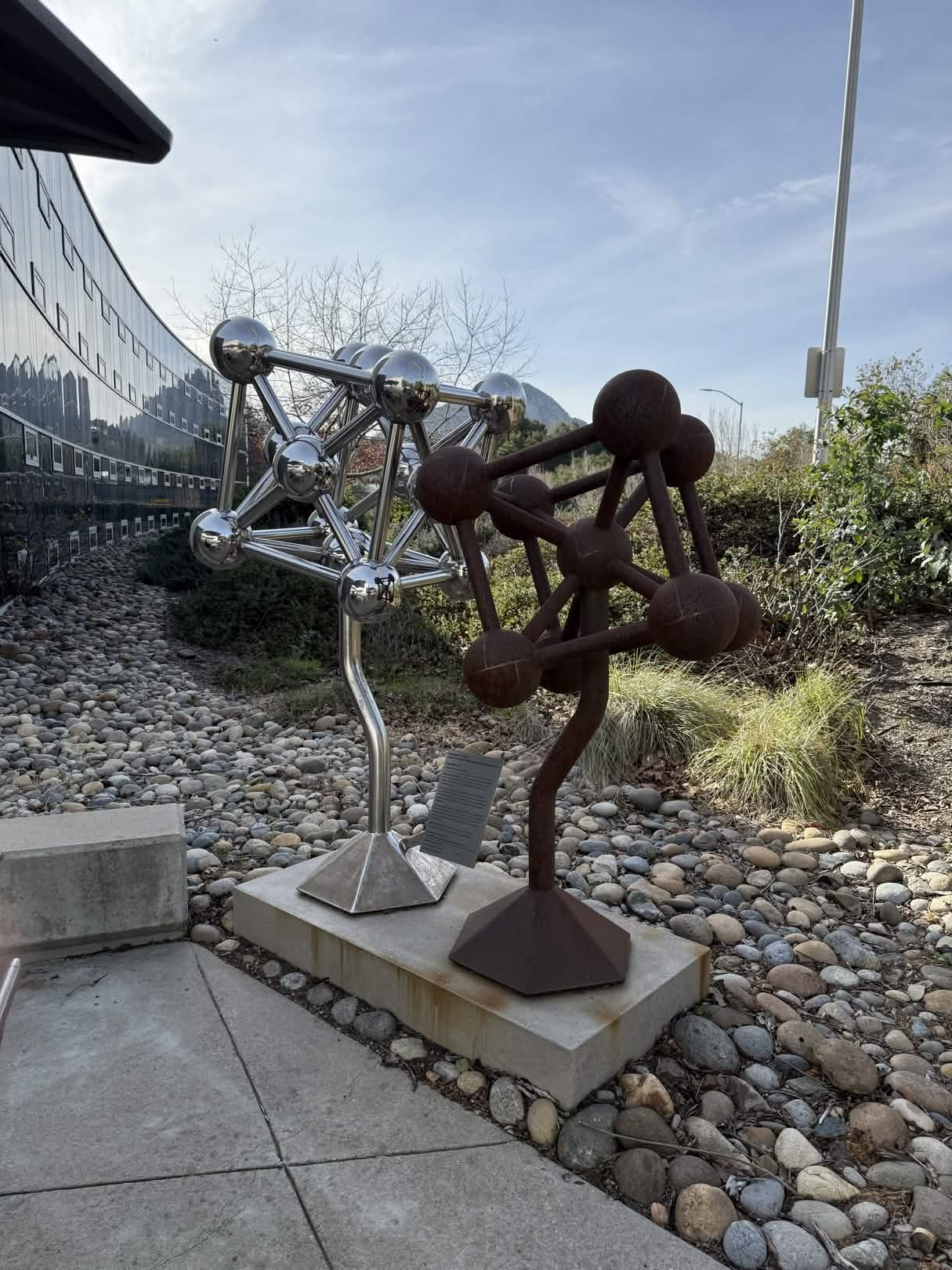
Atom Shifter, 2021, by S. Paterson. Installed outside Bldg. 41, it depicts Face centered cubic (left) and Body centered cubic (right) crystal structures, the structures of the stainless and mild steels that each are made from respectively.

The Industrial/Manufacturing Engineering program was ranked by U.S. News & World Report's 2021 "America's Best Colleges" report as 1st overall (of 2 programs ranked in engineering schools whose highest degree is a Master's).

=== Materials Engineering (MATE) ===
Cal Poly Materials Engineering is the only primarily undergraduate materials engineering program of the 53 Materials Science and Engineering departments in the United States. The department houses a multitude of materials characterization, mechanical testing, and metallography instruments; including two Scanning Electron Microscopes (SEM), an X-Ray Diffractometer (XRD), an X-Ray Fluorescence (XRF) analyzer, and more.

=== Mechanical Engineering (ME) ===
The Mechanical Engineering program was ranked by U.S. News & World Report's "America's Best Colleges" report as 3rd overall in 2021 and 2nd overall in 2026 (of the 30 programs ranked in engineering schools whose highest degree is a Master's). The department offers 5 concentrations:

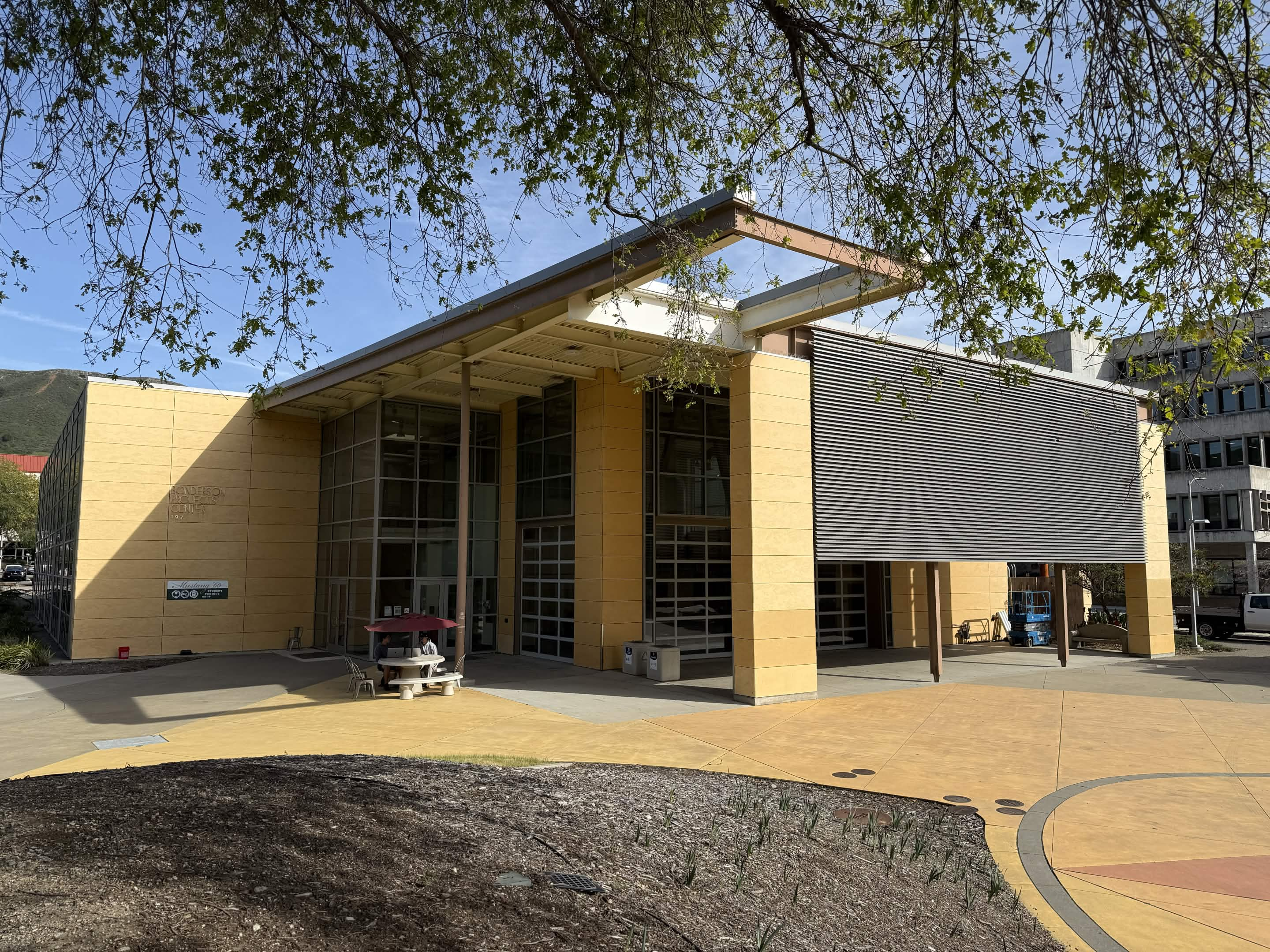
Bonderson Projects Center (Bldg. 197), which houses the Mustang '60 student workshop, administered by the ME department. The Robert E. Kennedy Library can be seen in the background.

- General Mechanical Engineering
- Energy Resources
- Heating, Ventilation, Air Conditioning, and Refrigeration (HVAC & R)
- Manufacturing
- Mechatronics

Mechanical Engineering was offered as a 4-year degree for the first time in 1941, under the Mechanical Industries department, with its first graduate the following year in 1942. Decreasing enrollments due to World War II caused the closure of the program in 1944, but post-war demand reinstated the program in 1946. Cal Poly's effective closure to women students in 1928 and re-opening in 1956 meant the Mechanical Engineering program hosted its first women students in 1957. The ME department assimilated the air conditioning program in the 1980s (becoming the HVAC concentration) and the aeronautics program, which was later reinstated in 1991.

The program is affiliated with ASME.

== Centers and Institutes ==
- Center for Sustainability in Engineering
- Electric Power Institute
- Global Waste Research Institute
- National Pool Industry Research Center
- Poly GAIT (Laboratory for Global Automatic Identification Technologies)

== See also ==
- Engineering colleges in California
