= Robert E. Kennedy (university president) =

American academic administrator

Robert Edwin Kennedy

7th President of Cal Poly San Luis Obispo
- In office April 3, 1968 – February 1, 1979
- Preceded by: Julian A. McPhee
- Succeeded by: Warren J. Baker

Personal details
- Born: October 31, 1915 Portland, Oregon
- Died: December 25, 2010 (aged 95) San Luis Obispo, California
- Education: San Diego State University (BA); Stanford University (MA); Claremont Graduate School (PhD)
- Website: Office of the President

Robert Edwin Kennedy (October 31, 1915 – December 25, 2010) was the seventh university president of California Polytechnic State University, San Luis Obispo (Cal Poly) from 1967 to 1979.

== Biography ==
=== Early life ===
Robert E. Kennedy was born in Portland, Oregon but lived most of his childhood in San Diego, California, graduating from Herbert Hoover High School in 1933. He received his B.A. from San Diego State University in 1938 with a Bachelor of Arts in English with minors in history and economics. While at San Diego State he served as the senior class president, the president of Tau Delta Phi fraternity, and the editor of Del Sudoeste, the college yearbook. The day after graduation he married Mary Paxton (1916-2013). He obtained his M.A. in journalism from Stanford University in 1950, and his Ph.D. in education administration from Claremont Graduate School in 1966.

=== Career ===
Kennedy joined the Cal Poly faculty in 1940 as a journalism instructor. He served as advisor to student publications, and during World War II, with the arrival of U.S. Naval training programs on the Cal Poly campus, instructed cadets in communications. In 1946, Kennedy became head of the Journalism Dept., to which title he added public relations director in 1949. He was assistant to President Julian McPhee from 1950 to 1957; dean of the Arts and Sciences Division from 1957 to 1959; and vice president of Cal Poly from 1959 to 1967. Following the retirement of President McPhee, Kennedy was appointed president in 1968 with Governor of California Ronald Reagan present at his inauguration. In 1972, under President Kennedy's leadership, California Polytechnic State College was officially designated California Polytechnic State University. During his long tenure as faculty and administrator at Cal Poly, Robert Kennedy represented the college on numerous state and national education councils, including the Chancellor's Council of Presidents and the American Association of State Colleges and Universities (AASCU). For the AASCU he served as a member of the board of directors, a representative to the Education Commission of the States and a member of AASCU committees on agriculture, public relations, and state relations. On January 5, 1981, the CSUC Trustees voted to name the Robert E. Kennedy Library in honor of his long and dedicated service to Cal Poly. Robert E. Kennedy died in San Luis Obispo, California, on December 25, 2010.
