= Bob Marquis =

Bob Marquis may refer to:

- Bob Marquis (baseball)
- Bob Marquis (ice hockey)

== See also ==
- Robert Marquis, German-born American architect and academic
