= SLO Transit =

Transit service in San Luis Obispo, California

- Founded: 1972 as Jim's Transportation
- Headquarters: 990 Palm Street
- Locale: San Luis Obispo, California
- Service area: San Luis Obispo County, California
- Service type: bus service
- Routes: 12
- Fleet: 16 buses
- Fuel type: CNG, battery electric
- Operator: Transdev
- Website: SLO Transit

SLO Transit is the provider of mass transportation within the city limits of San Luis Obispo, California. SLO Transit operates 10 vehicles at peak along eight fixed-routes within the 23 square miles of the city limits of San Luis Obispo and California Polytechnic State University (Cal Poly). SLO Transit operates Monday to Friday approximately from 6am to 11pm, and Saturday and Sunday from 8am to 8pm.

SLO Transit's ridership has increased steadily. It transports over 1.1 million riders annually. SLO Transit ridership demographics reflect a broad cross section of riders, including: seniors, people with disabilities, socially or economic transit dependent, K-12 students, college students, working professionals and choice riders. Operation and maintenance of all fixed-route services are contracted out to First Transit Inc., a third-party vendor.

SLO Transit provides its fixed route transit system information via various formats, including: online at slotransit.org, printed materials, Google & Bing Maps, Social Media, “Bus Tracker” smart phone application, City Hall (990 Palm Street, San Luis Obispo), the Transit Center, Parks & Rec Facilities, County Library & Offices, San Luis Obispo Council of Governments office (SLOCOG), by phone, print advertising, on vehicles, at bus stops, community centers and via neighboring transit agencies (e.g., SLO RTA).

The public has direct access for participating in the improvements and management of SLO Transit services. By direction of the City Council the Mass Transportation Committee (MTC) was formed in 1972 to provide them input on matters related to transit. The committee is an advisory body of citizen volunteers. Their purpose is to gather input and represent the general public on matters of setting priorities and to include input during the planning processes. MTC advisory body includes representation from the: Senior, Disabled, Technical, Student and General community.

SLO Transit has received many awards for its system including qualifying for Small Transit Intensive Cities (STIC) funding, a funding source only granted to cities that provide a greater level of service than which their city's population size would suggest.

For para-transit services, SLO Transit provides part of its funding allocation, off-the-top, to the county's consolidated para-transit service provider known as Run-About, operated by SLO Regional Transit Authority (SLO RTA), who also provides the fixed-route services to the other cities and parts of the county.

== Route overview ==
=== Local routes ===
Route	Terminals	Via	Notes
1A	San Luis Obispo Downtown Transit Center	Johnson Av	Serves San Luis Obispo County Regional Airport; Clockwise route
1B	San Luis Obispo Downtown Transit Center	Broad St	Serves San Luis Obispo County Regional Airport; Counter-clockwise route; Weekday only
2A	San Luis Obispo Downtown Transit Center	Higuera St	Clockwise route
2B	San Luis Obispo Downtown Transit Center	Madonna Rd	Counter-clockwise route; Weekday only
3A	San Luis Obispo Downtown Transit Center	Los Osos Valley Rd	Serves California Polytechnic State University; Clockwise route
3B	San Luis Obispo Downtown Transit Center	Foothill Bl	Serves California Polytechnic State University; Counter-clockwise route; Weekday only
4A	San Luis Obispo Downtown Transit Center	Santa Rose St	Serves California Polytechnic State University; Clockwise route
4B	San Luis Obispo Downtown Transit Center	Grand Av	Serves California Polytechnic State University; Counter-clockwise route; Weekday only

=== Express routes ===
Services operate Thursday nights.

Route	Terminals		Via	Notes
6X	San Luis Obispo Performing Arts Center	San Luis Obispo Downtown Transit Center	California Bl	Suspended

=== School Tripper routes ===
Route	Terminals		Via	Notes
SLT	San Luis Obispo Downtown Transit Center	San Luis Obispo San Luis Obispo High School	Johnson Av	Suspended; High school days only
LT	San Luis Obispo Downtown Transit Center	San Luis Obispo Los Osos Valley Rd & Auto Park Wy	Foothill Bl	Middle school days only
HT	San Luis Obispo Ramona Dr & Palomar Av	San Luis Obispo Robert E. Kennedy Library	Foothill Bl	Suspended; Weekday mornings only

== Gallery ==
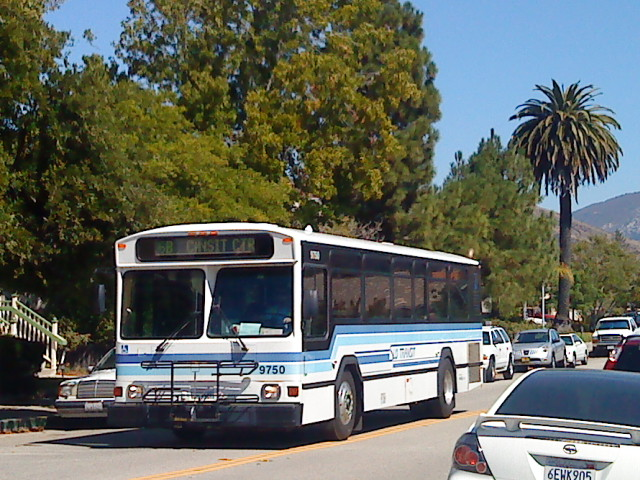
SLO Transit Gillig Phantom with old liverey

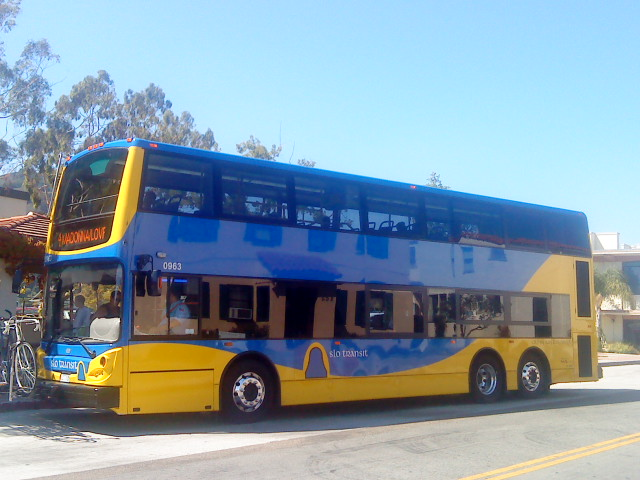
Alexander Dennis Enviro500
