= Amy Fleischer =

American mechanical engineer

Amy S. Fleischer is an American mechanical engineer whose research concerns thermal engineering, including sustainable energy, thermal energy storage using phase-change materials, and energy recovery from the heat management of electronic devices. She is dean of the Boise State University College of Engineering.

== Education and career ==
Fleischer's interest in mechanical engineering stems from a childhood desire to build spaceships. She majored in mechanical engineering at Villanova University, and earned a master's degree there. She completed her Ph.D. at the University of Minnesota in 2000. She returned to Villanova as a faculty member in 2000, and moved to California Polytechnic State University, San Luis Obispo as dean of engineering in 2018. Fleischer has been dean of the College of Engineering at Boise State University since January 2025.

== Recognition ==
In 2010, Fleischer won the Woman Engineer of the Year award of the American Society of Mechanical Engineers Electronic and Photonic Packaging Division. In 2011, she won the society's K-16 Clock Award, for "outstanding and continuing contributions to the science and engineering of heat transfer in electronics". Villanova University gave Fleischer their Outstanding Faculty Mentor Teaching Award in 2011. She was elected as an ASME Fellow in 2013.
