= Cal Poly College of Engineering =

Cal Poly College of Engineering may refer to:

- Cal Poly Pomona College of Engineering, a college of engineering in the city of Pomona, California
- Cal Poly San Luis Obispo College of Engineering, a college of engineering in the city of San Luis Obispo, California
