= Robert Marquis =

German-born American architect and academic

Robert Marquis (1927 – January 3, 1995) was a German-born American architect and academic known for his socially conscious architecture. Primarily active in San Francisco, he was a professor of architecture at the University of Virginia in the early 1980s. He was chancellor of the College of Fellows of the American Institute of Architects in 1991.

== Life and career ==
Born in Stuttgart, Germany, in 1927, Marquis's family left their native country in 1937 due to the rise of Nazi Germany. He settled with his family in Los Angeles, California, when he was 10 years old. From 1946 through 1949, he studied architecture at the University of Southern California, but left without obtaining a degree to pursue studies at the Accademia di Belle Arti di Firenze in 1949–1950. He established his first architecture business in San Francisco in 1953.

In 1956 Marquis formed a partnership with architect Claude Stoller, entitled Marquis & Stoller Architects. Together they designed the highly regarded St. Francis Square housing complex with landscape architect Lawrence Halprin; a racially integrated housing development for working-class people which was built in 1963. Funded by the International Longshoremen's and Warehousemen's Union, this project gained national recognition for its socially conscious architecture, which aided urban renewal and worked towards meeting social justice needs concerning racial equality in San Francisco.

In 1974 Marquis parted ways with Stoller and established the architecture firm Marquis Associates which had offices in San Francisco and New York City; a business which he continued to lead until his death 21 years later. In 1985 he drew wide attention again when he transformed a crime-ridden low-income housing complex in San Francisco known as the "Pink Palace" into the Rosa Parks Apartments, a safe and affordable housing complex for the elderly. This work became a model for urban renewal plans for reinventing failed low-income housing projects nationally. In a 1992 interview Marquis stated the following about his firm's philosophy:

We believe that architecture is a social art that serves people and their society. I am not just referring to functional needs, but also to the users' spiritual and psychological needs, their aspirations.

In addition to his socially conscious projects, Marquis designed several buildings for universities. These included the Robert E. Kennedy Library at California Polytechnic State University and the music buildings at Stanford University, California State University, Fresno, and the Aaron Copland School of Music at Queens College, City University of New York among others. He also worked on several government projects, including designing the visitor center at the Franklin Delano Roosevelt Memorial and designing office buildings for the Embassy of the United States, Dhaka, and the Embassy of the United States in Costa Rica. He designed the Primate Center at the San Francisco Zoo which opened in 1983. Further, San Francisco area-based projects included government buildings, apartment complexes, churches, schools, homes, and other community structures.

In 1980 Marquis was named Thomas Jefferson Professor of Architecture at the University of Virginia. In 1991 he served as chancellor of the College of Fellows of the American Institute of Architects. In his last years, his architecture partners were Gita Dev and Hal Brandes.

== Personal life ==
Marquis married in 1950 and had three children and three grandchildren. He died during pancreatic surgery on January 3, 1995.
