= Cal Poly College of Architecture and Environmental Design =

Cal Poly College of Architecture and Environmental Design may refer to:

- Cal Poly Pomona College of Environmental Design, an environmental design college in the city of Pomona, California.
- Cal Poly San Luis Obispo College of Architecture and Environmental Design, an environmental design college in the city of San Luis Obispo, California.
