= Julian A. McPhee =

Julian Aeneas McPhee (February 7, 1896 – November 10, 1967) was the sixth university president of California Polytechnic State University, San Luis Obispo (Cal Poly) from 1933 to 1966 and the first president of California State Polytechnic University, Pomona (Cal Poly Pomona) from 1938 to 1966.

== Biography ==
=== Early life ===
Julian A. McPhee was born in San Francisco in 1896 to Charles and Ellen MacDonald McPhee, Canadian immigrants of Scottish descent. He grew up in San Francisco, California, before earning his B.A. in agriculture from University of California, Berkeley in 1917. During his senior year, McPhee began teaching agricultural education at Pomona High School in Los Angeles County. He continued pursuing education as a career before enlisting in the United States Navy as an ensign during the final months of World War I. He briefly worked as an instructor at the Naval Port Guard and an aide in Naval Intelligence before receiving an honorable discharge when the war ended in 1918. Julian returned to San Francisco and married Alma Doyle, with whom he would have six daughters: Helen, Bernadette, Jean, Claire, Carol, and Jule Ann.

=== Career ===
==== Agricultural Education ====
After the war, McPhee resumed his pursuit of education, becoming a high school agriculture teacher at Gilroy High School in Gilroy, California, where he was soon promoted to vice principal. During his years as a high school educator, McPhee strongly emphasizing agricultural education by forming agricultural and mechanical clubs in each of Gilroy's public schools, as well as encouraging "learn by doing," a philosophy which he later adapted to the Cal Polys, which still employ it to this day. In 1928, McPhee completed his master's degree in Agricultural Education through the University of California, Los Angeles. From 1926 to 1944, McPhee worked as Chief of the State Bureau of Agricultural Education, forming the California state headquarters of Future Farmers of America in Sacramento, California, which were transferred to San Luis Obispo, California in 1931.

==== Tenure at Cal Poly ====
Due to his influence in agricultural education, McPhee was appointed president of Cal Poly San Luis Obispo in 1933, replacing Benjamin Crandall, who resigned due to his frustration with the college's dilapidated facilities and the lack of funding caused by the Great Depression. At that time, the state government was discussing the idea of converting Cal Poly into a state prison. By increasing profitable agricultural programs at Cal Poly San Luis Obispo, McPhee not only saved the college from being closed by the state, but developed Cal Poly San Luis Obispo from a two-year technical school to a four-year college in the California State University (CSU) system. Prior to McPhee's appointment, in 1930 due to crushing budget constraints, Cal Poly transitioned to an all-male institution as a cost savings measure, a policy which continued until 1956. During World War II, McPhee served as director of California's War Food Production Training Program. He later served as acting chief of the Bureau of Readjustment Education, assistant executive officer of the State Board of Vocational Education, and director of Vocational Education for the State of California. He also oversaw the establishment of a second Cal Poly campus in Pomona, California which he acquired from cereal magnate Will Keith Kellogg in 1949 and which became a separate CSU college, California State Polytechnic University, Pomona, in 1966. That same year, after thirty-three years as president of the Cal Polys, Julian A. McPhee retired due to failing health. He died of colon cancer on November 10, 1967 at the age of 71. Two current landmarks of Cal Poly San Luis Obispo's campus are named for McPhee: the Julian A. McPhee University Union and Julian's Patisserie, a small coffee shop located within the Robert E. Kennedy Library, itself named for Robert E. Kennedy, McPhee's successor as university president.
