= Notre Dame Preparatory School (Fitchburg, Massachusetts) =

High school in Fitchburg, Massachusetts

Notre Dame Preparatory School is a small coeducational, private Catholic school established in 1952 by the Brothers of the Sacred Heart. It is located in Fitchburg, Massachusetts.

The population of the school averaged 32–42 students, boarding and day. The school is primarily known for its basketball program, which has developed college and professional players.

== Notable alumni ==
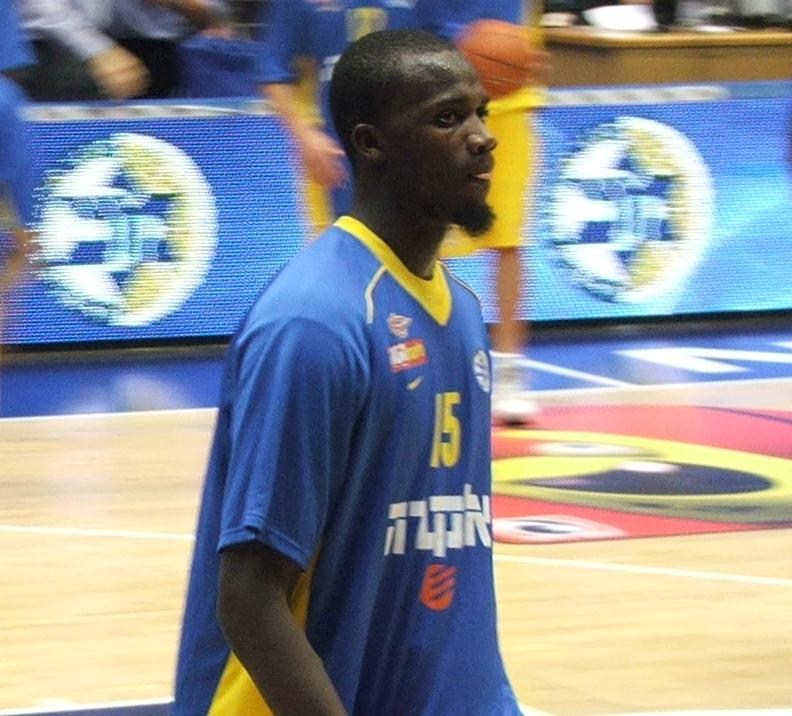
Shawn James

- Steven Adams (Class of 2012) center drafted by the Oklahoma City Thunder in the first round of the 2013 NBA draft, currently playing for the Houston Rockets
- Warren J. Baker, university president.
- Michael Beasley (1989–) former professional basketball player.
- Will Blalock (1983–) point guard with the Reno Bighorns of the NBA D-League.
- Derrick Caracter (1988–) power forward/center for Bnei Herzliya in Israel. Transferred to Notre Dame during his junior year.
- John Clark- Long time Rock DJ at WPYX and WQBK-FM in Albany, NY, WBLM in Portland, Me and WAAF Worcester/Boston! Attended Notre Dame 1970-1972.
- Myles Davis (born 1993) former basketball player for Xavier Musketeers men’s basketball team
- Marcus Douthit (Class of 1999) forward-center who played for the Providence Friars. Douthit was drafted by the Los Angeles Lakers in the 2004 NBA draft.
- Kim English – former professional basketball player and current head basketball coach for Providence College.
- Chester Frazier - current assistant basketball coach at University of Illinois men's basketball.
- Grandy Glaze , a Canadian former professional basketball player.
- Ryan Gomes (1982–) basketball player currently with the Artland Dragons of the Basketball Bundesliga.
- Paul Harris (1986) – basketball player for Syracuse University.
- Lazar Hayward (1986–) basketball player who played three seasons in the NBA.
- Shawn James – professional basketball player for Maccabi Tel Aviv
- Sean Kilpatrick (1990-) - former Cincinnati Bearcat and current shooting guard for the Chicago Bulls; basketball player for Hapoel Jerusalem of the Israeli Basketball Super League
