= University House, San Luis Obispo =

University residence in California, US

University House
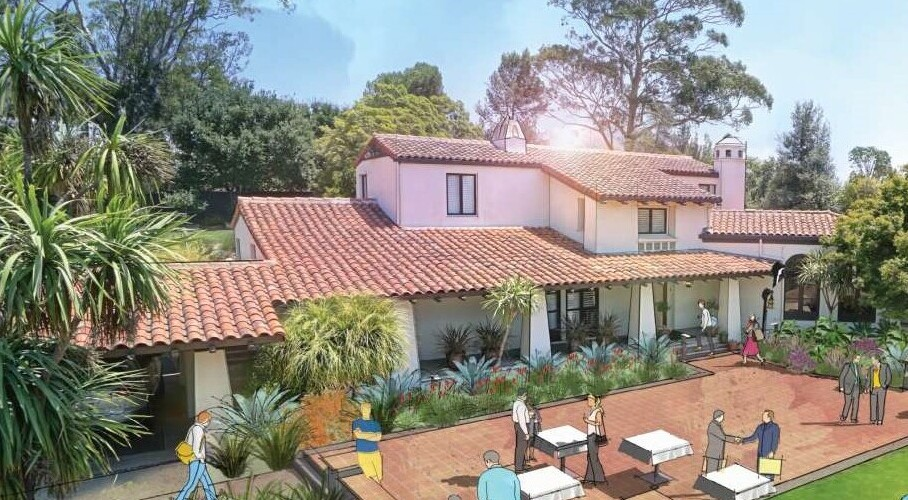
- Interactive map of the University House area

General information
- Architectural style: Spanish Colonial Revival
- Location: 7 Campus Way; San Luis Obispo, California
- Coordinates: 35°17′53″N 120°39′45″W

University House is the official residence of the President of California Polytechnic State University, San Luis Obispo, located in San Luis Obispo, California. The house's interior is 5,000 square feet.

== History ==
The house was built in 1928 in a Spanish Colonial Revival style and was originally known simply as Building 51. Its first occupants were Benjamin and Matilda Crandall.

The house was unoccupied from 2004, until its renovation in 2010–11, for a cost of $430,000.
