= Cal Poly athletics =

Cal Poly athletics may refer to:

- Cal Poly Humboldt Lumberjacks, the athletic program at Cal Poly Humboldt in Arcata, California
- Cal Poly Mustangs, the athletic program at Cal Poly San Luis Obispo in San Luis Obispo, California
- Cal Poly Pomona Broncos, the athletic program at Cal Poly Pomona in Pomona, California
