= Warren J. Baker =

American academic (1938–2022)

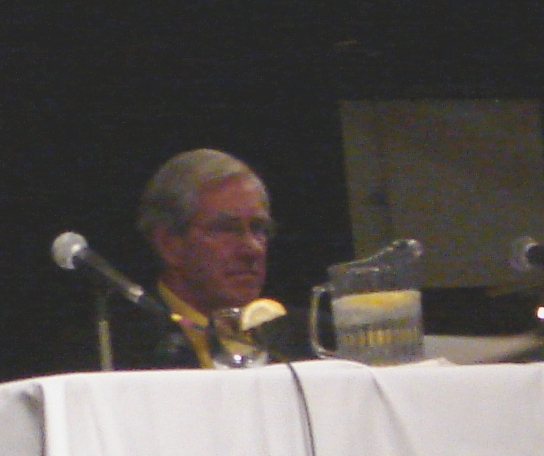

President of Cal Poly San Luis Obispo
- In office August 1979 – June 2010

Personal details
- Born: September 5, 1938 Fitchburg, Massachusetts, U.S.
- Died: October 7, 2022 (aged 84)
- Spouse: Carly
- Children: 4
- Education: University of Notre Dame (BS, MS); University of New Mexico (PhD)

Warren J. Baker (September 5, 1938 – October 7, 2022) was an American academic administrator who was president of California Polytechnic State University (Cal Poly San Luis Obispo). Baker was the eighth president of Cal Poly San Luis Obispo, holding the office from 1979 until 2010.

== Early life and education ==
Baker was born in Fitchburg, Massachusetts, on September 5, 1938. He graduated from Notre Dame Preparatory School in Fitchburg in 1956. He attended the University of Notre Dame, where he earned a bachelor's degree in civil engineering in 1960 and his master's degree in 1962. Baker earned a doctoral degree in civil engineering from the University of New Mexico in 1966. He also studied at the Institute for Educational Management at Harvard Business School.

Baker was a professor at the University of Detroit from 1972 until 1979. He served as dean of the College of Engineering from 1973 to 1978 and as vice president for academic affairs from 1976 to 1979.

== Cal Poly San Luis Obispo ==
The California State University's board of trustees named Baker president of Cal Poly San Luis Obispo on May 22, 1979. He was the youngest campus president in California State University history.

As president, Baker noted that fundraising was the biggest need for the university. Baker raised approximately $1 billion in new facilities and renovations over three decades. He steered Cal Poly San Luis Obispo toward greater support from industry, alumni, and friends, leading what became a record-breaking $264 million Centennial Campaign. He shepherded the donation of the 3,200-acre (1,300 ha) Swanton Pacific Ranch in Santa Cruz by alumnus Albert B. Smith, president of Orchard Supply Hardware.

Cal Poly San Luis Obispo experienced significant growth under Baker's tenure. Under his leadership, Cal Poly increased the breadth of academic programs, adding 20 majors, 72 minors, and 15 master's degree programs. In 1993, U.S. News & World Report ranked Cal Poly as the best public university in the West, a title the university has held for 30 consecutive years. In 1990, due to attendee riots, Baker suspended Poly Royal, the campus open house. Baker was a finalist to become the president of the University of Nebraska system in 1993; he withdrew from contention.

The Baker Forum, which focuses on the social and economic roles and responsibilities of polytechnic universities, was established by the Cal Poly San Luis Obispo President's Council of Advisors to recognize 20 years of service by Baker and his wife Carly. The Warren J. Baker Center for Science and Mathematics, which opened in 2013, is named after Baker. It houses lecture rooms, labs, and faculty offices for the university's physical science programs.

Baker retired in 2010.

== Personal life and death ==
Baker and his wife, Carly, had four children. Baker died on October 7, 2022, at age 84.
