= Robert E. Kennedy Library =

Robert E. Kennedy Library is the primary library of California Polytechnic State University, San Luis Obispo. Opened in 1980 and named in honor of President Emeritus Robert E. Kennedy, the five-story building houses nearly five million items, and is the largest library between Santa Cruz and Santa Barbara.

== History ==
Cal Poly's first library was founded in 1903 in a single room of the original administration building on campus (now demolished). In 1942, the library made its first move to the newly completed clock-tower administration building.

The first building to be constructed at the university after World War II was The Walter F. Dexter Library, which cost $700,000. Dedicated in October 1948, the building was named after the Sacramento administrator who had helped secure collegiate status for Cal Poly eight years earlier.

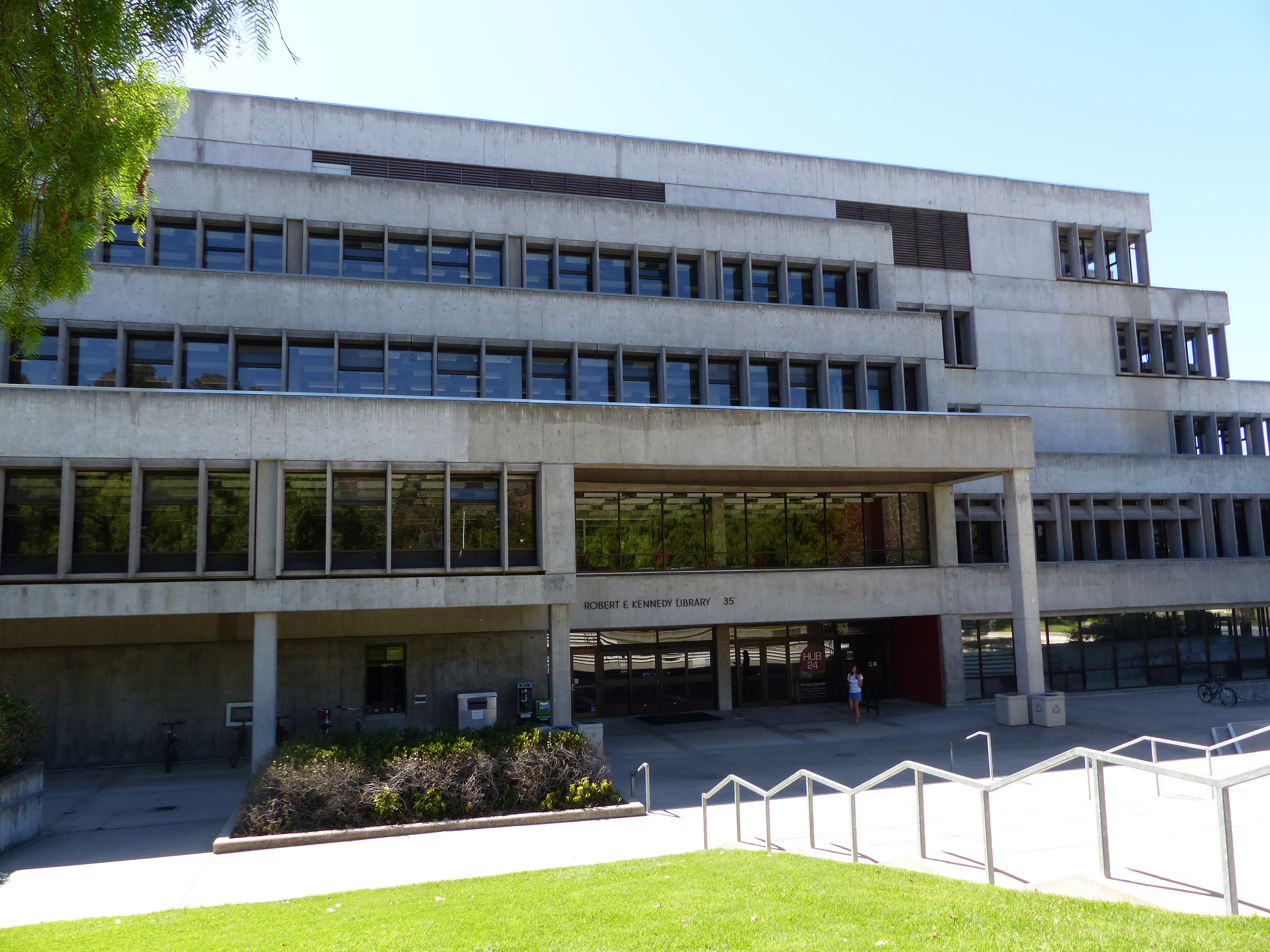
Kennedy Library is pictured in September 2018, about five years before a renovation process began.

In 1980, the library moved to its current location, a building named in honor of President Emeritus Robert E. Kennedy (1966-1979). The building was designed by architect Robert Marquis, and built between 1977 and August 1980 at a cost of $11 million.

The library contains nearly five million items, including books, journals, electronic resources, multimedia, K-12 learning resources, and government documents.

The library underwent a $77 million renovation and reopened in the fall of 2025.

== Collections ==
Special Collections, a department of The Robert E. Kennedy Library at Cal Poly, was established in 1969 to build primary source research collections to support the polytechnic curriculum of the university.

Major subject areas in the collections include: book arts, environmental history, ethnic studies, fine printing, graphic arts, landscape architecture, regional history & social history.

Researchers from every state and many countries have traveled to the Kennedy Library to use the archival collections of manuscripts, rare books, architectural drawings, and photographs. Special Collections materials have been featured on BBC, CNN, PBS, A&E, and in international print media.

The library collects archival and printed materials on the history, growth, and development of Cal Poly in the University Archives.

== Services ==
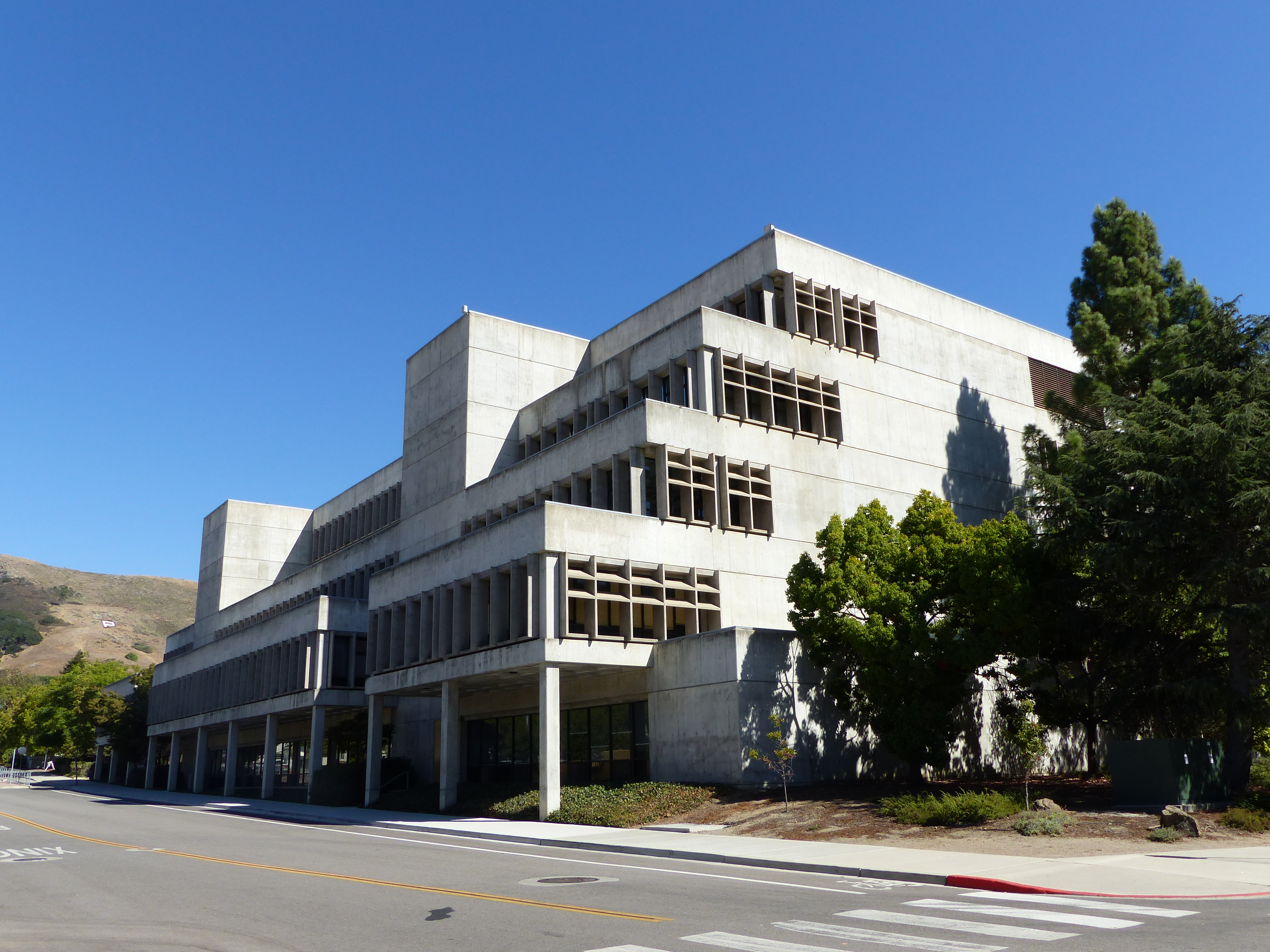
Cal Poly's Kennedy Library, which first opened in 1980, is seen in 2018.

Before the renovation, the building included seven computer labs, 12 large collaboration rooms for up to eight people, more than 20 group-study rooms on the 2nd, 3rd, and 4th floors, and a number of non-group study rooms. There were 300 computers, and equipment available on loan including laptop computers and camera equipment.

The Robert E. Kennedy Library has been voted "Best On-Campus Study Spot" every year since 2006 by readers of the campus newspaper, Mustang News.

== Public programs ==
Kennedy Library offers a number of ongoing and special events for both the campus and the community:

- Conversations with Cal Poly Authors celebrates publications of creative and scholarly books by Cal Poly faculty and staff.
- The Kennedy Library was one of eight national recipients of the 2012 Freedom to Read Foundation's Judith F. Krug Fund Grant, which supported the 30th anniversary of Banned Books Week. The library celebrated with infographics (designed by Cal Poly students), a podcast series, and an appearance by Stephen Chbosky, the author of The Perks of Being a Wallflower.
- In 2014, Kennedy Library was named an Association of College and Research Libraries (ACRL) Excellence in Academic Libraries Award Winner. Sponsored by ACRL and YBP Library Services, the award recognizes library staff and programs that deliver exemplary services and resources to further the educational mission of the institution. ACRL awards are given out in university, college, and community college categories. Robert E. Kennedy Library was selected in the university category for the innovations in student engagement.
