= Cal Poly San Luis Obispo College of Architecture and Environmental Design =

Architecture school in California, U.S.

Coordinates: 35.301°N 120.664°W

College of Architecture And Environmental Design
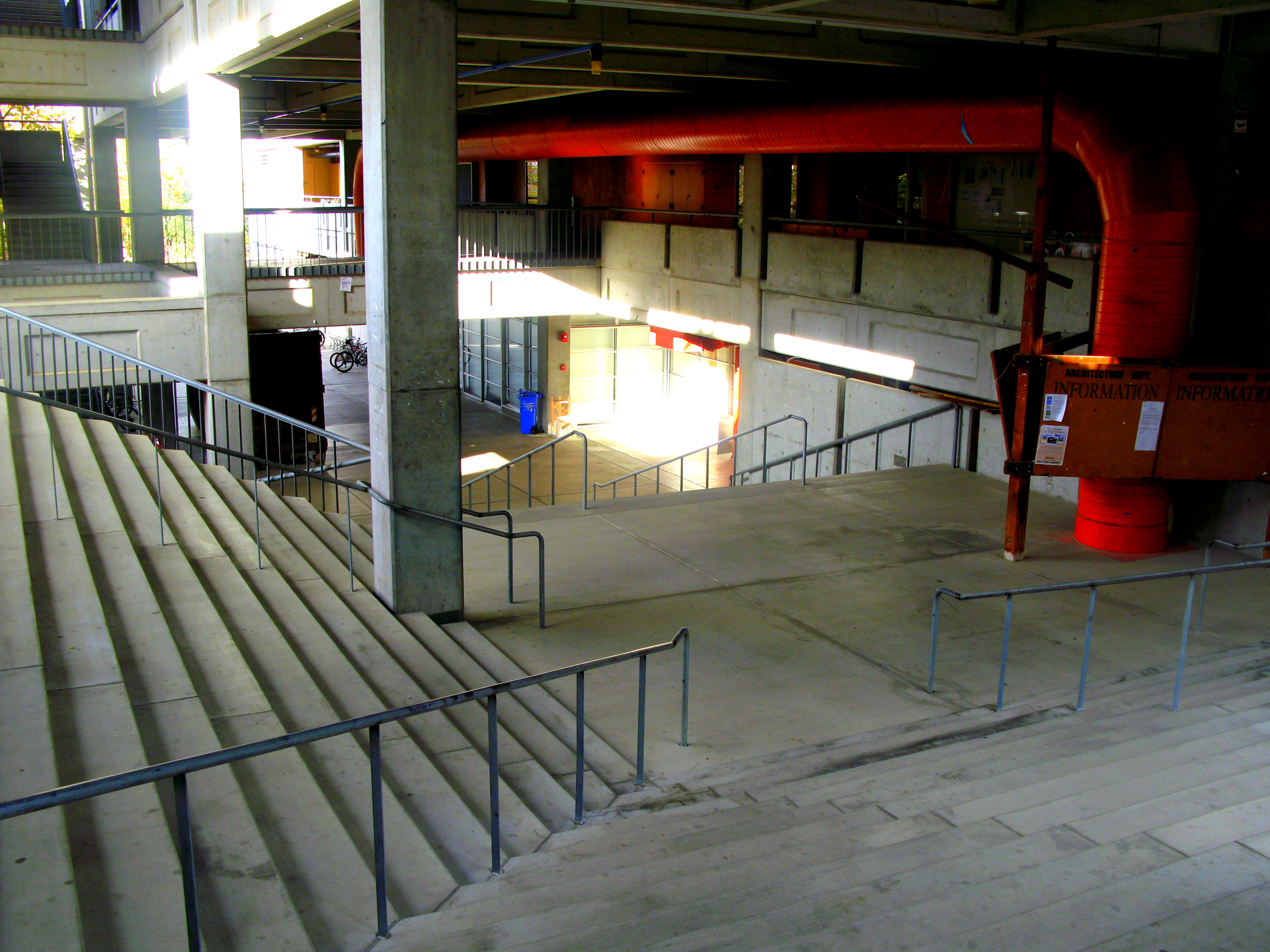
- Motto: Discere Faciendo (Latin)
- Type: Public
- Established: 1948
- Dean: Kevin Dong (interim)
- Academic staff: 117 (fall 2023)
- Students: 1,952 (fall 2023)
- Undergraduates: 1,912 (fall 2023)
- Postgraduates: 40 (fall 2023)
- Location: San Luis Obispo, CA, USA
- Campus: Suburban
- Website: caed.calpoly.edu

The California Polytechnic State University College of Architecture and Environmental Design (or CAED) is one of Cal Poly San Luis Obispo's six colleges. The college has over 1,900 students and offers bachelor's degrees in five departments, as well as two master's degree programs.

== General information ==
In the 2014 edition of "America's Best Architecture & Design Schools" published by the leading architecture and design journal DesignIntelligence, Cal Poly was rated the No. 1 undergraduate architecture program in the nation. The landscape architecture program is ranked No. 1 in the Western region and No. 4 in the nation.

== Departments ==
=== Architectural Engineering ===
The Architectural Engineering department is accredited by the Accreditation Board for Engineering and Technology to offer Bachelor of Science (BS) degrees.

=== Architecture ===
The Architecture department is accredited by the National Architectural Accrediting Board (NAAB), and offers both Bachelor of Architecture (BArch) and Masters of Science in Architecture (MS-Arch) degrees. The undergraduate program is a five-year program. About one in twenty architects in the United States, and one in five in California, are graduates of Cal Poly. The journal DesignIntelligence has continually ranked the architecture program among the top 10 in the nation in its annual edition of "America's Best Architecture & Design Schools. More specifically, Cal Poly's undergraduate architecture program placed sixth in 2007, fourth in 2008, third in 2009, third in 2010, fourth in 2011, fourth in 2012, and fifth in 2013. In 2014, Cal Poly's program ranked first.

=== City and Regional Planning ===
The City and Regional Planning department is accredited by the Planning Accreditation Board and offers Bachelor of Science in City and Regional Planning (BSCRP) and Master of City and Regional Planning (MCRP) degrees.

=== Construction Management ===
The Construction Management department is accredited by the American Council for Construction Education.

=== Landscape Architecture ===
The Landscape Architecture department is accredited by the Landscape Architectural Accreditation Board and offers Bachelor of Landscape Architecture (BL Arch) degrees.

== Admissions ==
For freshmen entering fall 2023, the College of Architecture and Environmental Design accepted 30% of applicants (1,074 accepted/3,527 applied).

== See also ==
- Architecture
- Landscape architecture
- Urban planning
- Regional planning
- Environmental design
- California Polytechnic State University

== Notes ==
- Cal Poly, San Luis Obispo - College of Architecture and Environmental Design, university-directory.eu
