= California Polytechnic State University, San Luis Obispo =

Public university in San Luis Obispo, California

California Polytechnic State University
- Former names: California Polytechnic School (1901–1947), California Polytechnic State College (1947–1972)
- Motto: Discere Faciendo (Latin)
- Motto in English: "Learn by Doing"
- Type: Public polytechnic university
- Established: March 8, 1901; 125 years ago
- Parent institution: California State University
- Accreditation: WSCUC
- Academic affiliations: Space-grant
- Endowment: $335.8 million (2025)
- President: Jeffrey D. Armstrong
- Provost: Al Liddicoat (interim)
- Faculty: 1,600 (fall 2025)
- Administrative staff: 1,827 (fall 2025)
- Undergraduates: 22,313 (fall 2025)
- Postgraduates: 932 (fall 2025)
- Location: San Luis Obispo, California, United States
- Campus: 9,678 acres (3,917 ha) total; 1,321 acres (535 ha) main campus; 155 acres (63 ha) campus core; Small suburb
- Newspapers: Mustang News, Cal Poly News
- Colors: Green and Gold
- Nickname: Mustangs
- Sporting affiliations: NCAA Division I FCS – Big West; Big Sky; Pac-12; MPSF
- Mascots: Chase the Mustang; Musty the Mustang
- Website: www.calpoly.edu

California Polytechnic State University, San Luis Obispo (Cal Poly) is a public university in San Luis Obispo County, California, United States, outside of the city limits of San Luis Obispo. Founded in 1901, it is the oldest of three polytechnic universities within the California State University system. Cal Poly emphasizes a "learn by doing" philosophy, integrating hands-on, practical experiences into its curriculum. As of fall 2025, Cal Poly had approximately 22,000 undergraduate and 900 graduate students.

The university is home to several programs, including in engineering, architecture, and business. Most of the university's athletic teams participate in the Big West Conference.

== History ==
The California Polytechnic School

=== Establishment and early years ===
Cal Poly was founded in 1901 as the California Polytechnic School, following the signing of the California Polytechnic School Bill by Governor Henry Gage. The school began classes on October 1, 1903, with 20 students enrolled, offering three-year secondary-level courses.

Originally coeducational, the school enrolled 16 male and 4 female students. In 1929, California Governor C.C. Young prohibited women from attending. Women were readmitted in 1956. By Fall 2023, female students constituted 50.1% of the total student population.

=== Transition to higher education ===
In 1924, Cal Poly came under the control of the California State Board of Education. During the Great Depression, financial constraints led to discussions in Sacramento about converting Cal Poly into a state prison. It was saved by Julian A. McPhee, who went on to lead Cal Poly as its president for thirty-three years.

In 1933, the institution transitioned to a two-year technological and vocational school. By 1940, it began offering Bachelor of Arts degrees, with the first baccalaureate ceremony held in 1942. In 1947, the school was renamed California State Polytechnic College to better reflect its expanding higher education offerings. A Master of Arts degree in education was added in 1949.

=== Expansion and satellite campuses ===
In 1938, Charles and Jerry Voorhis donated a farm and school to Cal Poly. In 1949, the W.K. Kellogg Foundation gifted an 812-acre horse ranch in Pomona, California. Originally a satellite campus for Cal Poly, the Pomona campus became an independent university, Cal Poly Pomona, in 1966.

=== Integration into the CSU system ===
In 1960, control of Cal Poly in San Luis Obispo and other state colleges was transferred to the newly formed CSU system. That same year, a plane crash killed 22 of the 48 people on board, including 16 Cal Poly football players.

Authorized to offer Master of Science degrees in 1967, Cal Poly reorganized its curriculum from 1967 to 1970 into specialized schools: the School of Science and Mathematics, the School of Agriculture and Natural Resources, and the School of Architecture. In 1968, Cal Poly's FM radio station, KCPR, was launched as a senior project.

In 1971, the California State Legislature officially renamed the institution California Polytechnic State University. Since the 1970s, the university has seen steady enrollment growth and significant campus expansion.

=== Major donations and 21st century developments ===
On May 3, 2017, Cal Poly received a $110 million gift from alumni William L. and Linda Frost, one of the largest donations ever made to public education in California.

In 2022, the university established the Noyce School of Applied Computing, combining three departments - electrical engineering, computer engineering, and software engineering - under one umbrella through donations received from the Robert N. Noyce Trust. In 2024, the school received a $60 million gift from the trust to establish an endowment, funding operations for the foreseeable future.

In 2024, the CSU system recommended integrating Cal Maritime with Cal Poly San Luis Obispo. On November 21, 2024, the CSU Board of Trustees approved the CSU Chancellor's recommendation. As of July 1, 2025, the two universities operate as a single institution: Cal Poly. On May 21, 2025, the university announced that Dr. Corey Cook had been named vice president and chief executive officer of Cal Poly, Solano Campus in Vallejo, and Rear Admiral (Retired) Eric C. Jones, USCG, had been named superintendent of the Cal Poly Maritime Academy, effective July 1. The full integration of academics will be completed in fall 2026 and all Cal Poly Maritime Academy and Cal Poly, Solano Campus students will be enrolled as Cal Poly students.

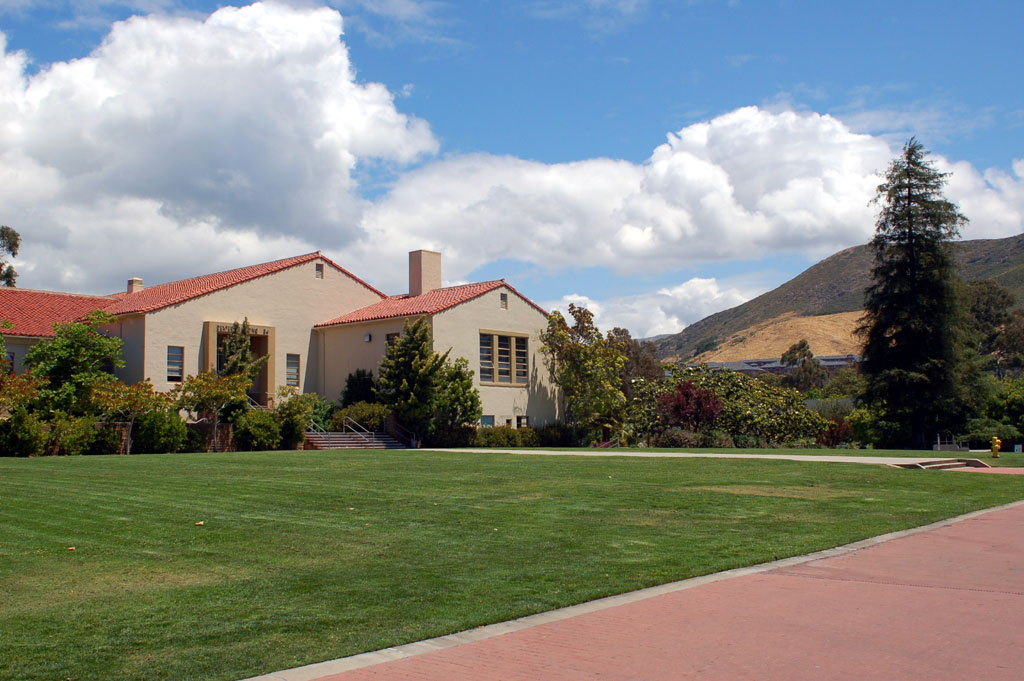
The Dexter Lawn – Cal Poly in San Luis Obispo's unofficial social center and meeting place

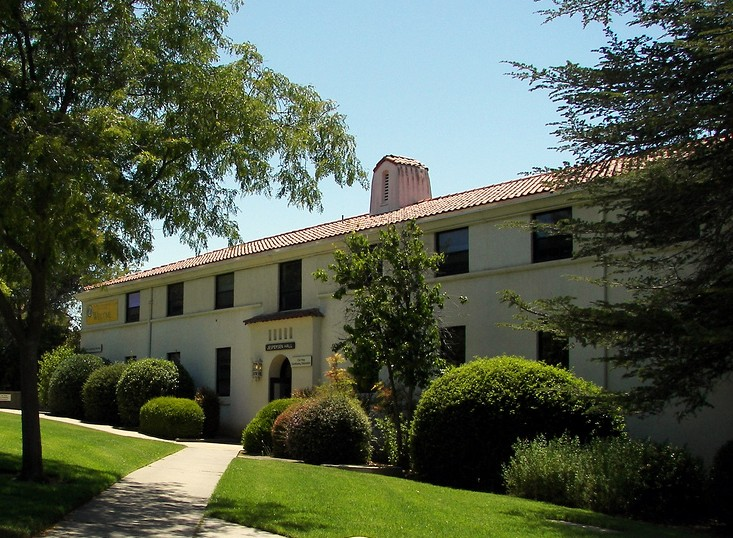
Jespersen Hall

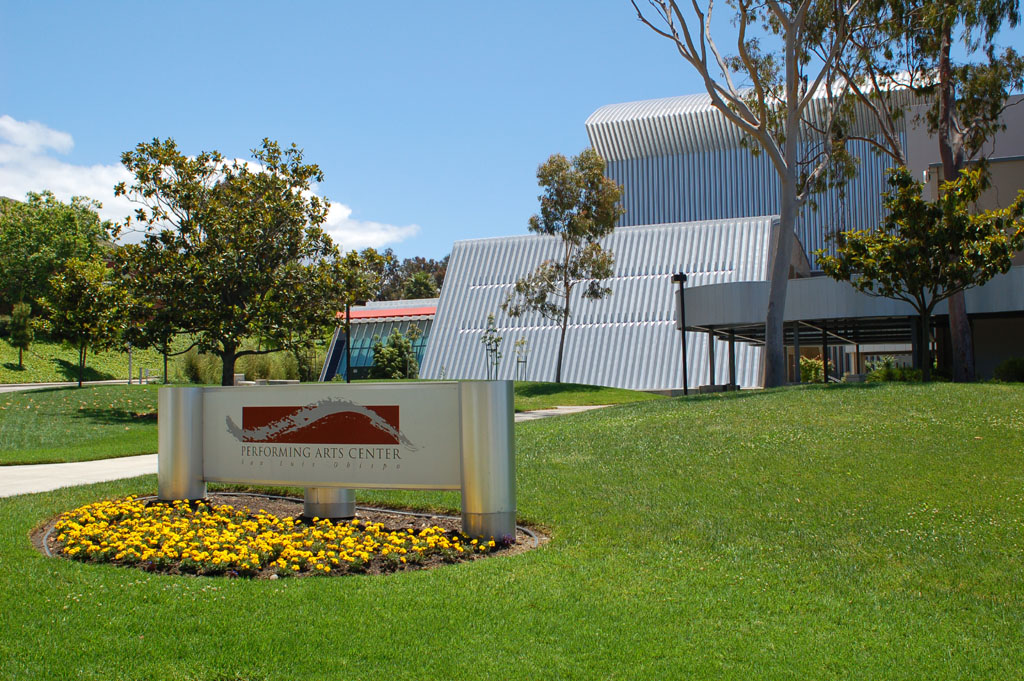
Performing Arts Center

== Campus ==
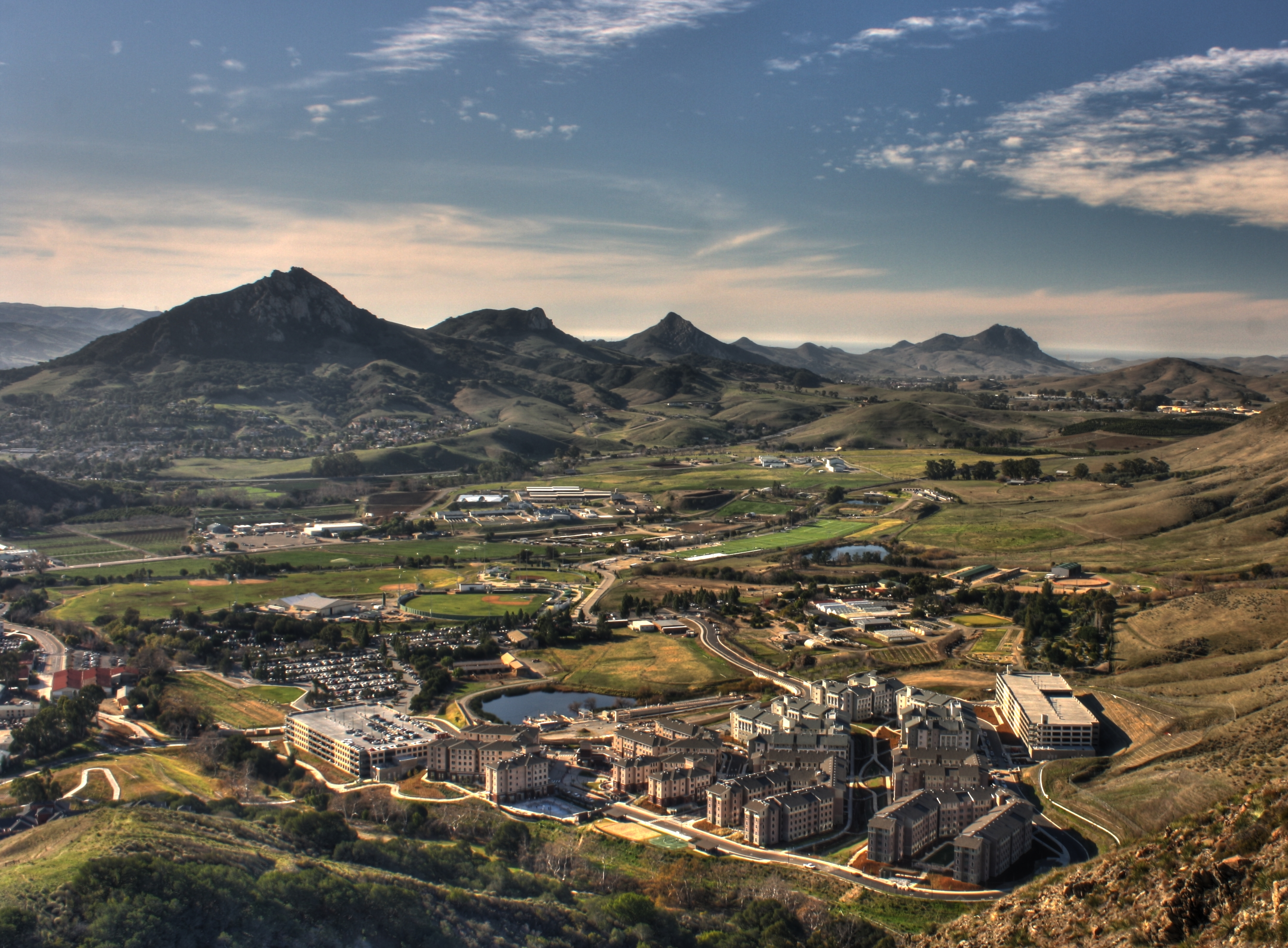
Poly Canyon Village student housing, built in 2009

Cal Poly is in an unincorporated area of San Luis Obispo County, outside the city of San Luis Obispo. It has a postal address as "San Luis Obispo, CA". For statistical purposes, the United States Census Bureau has defined Cal Poly as a census-designated place (CDP).

Cal Poly has one of the largest college campuses in the United States, covering 9,967.6 parcel acres and making it one of the state's largest land-holding universities. The property includes the main campus, two agricultural lands, and two sites in Santa Cruz County. The Swanton Pacific Ranch, a 3,200-acre ranch in Santa Cruz County, provides educational and research opportunities, encompassing rangeland, livestock, and forestry operations for the College of Agriculture, Food, and Environmental Sciences. It supports Cal Poly's "Learn by Doing" philosophy with an emphasis on sustainable agricultural practices and laboratory experiments. University House serves as the university president's residence.

The census-designated place is in the San Luis Coastal Unified School District.

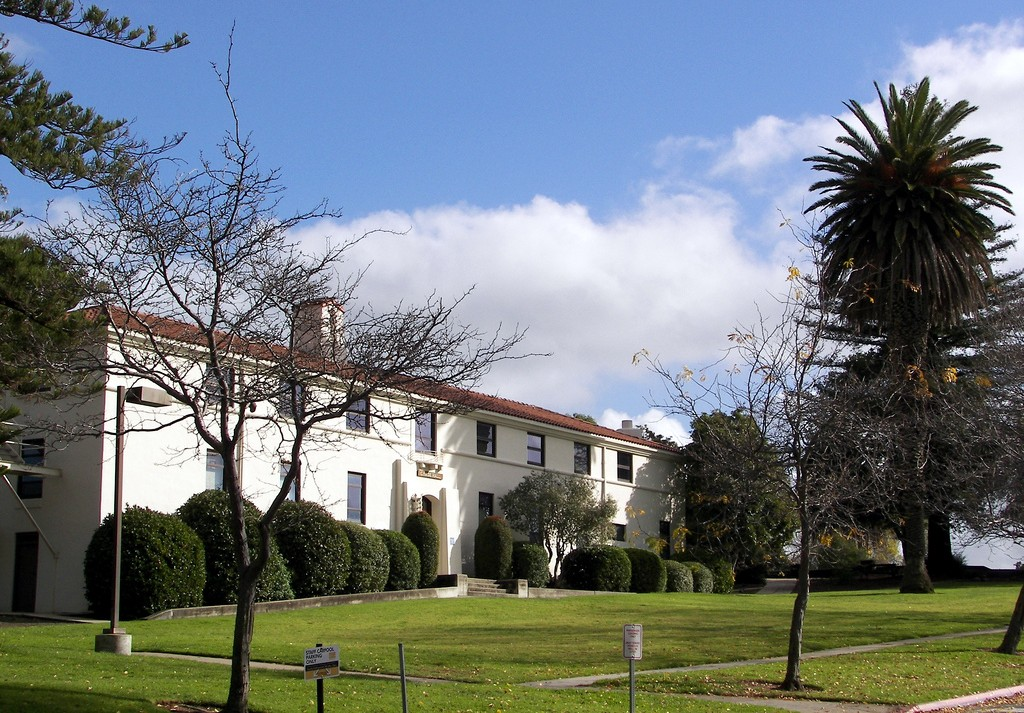
Chase Hall

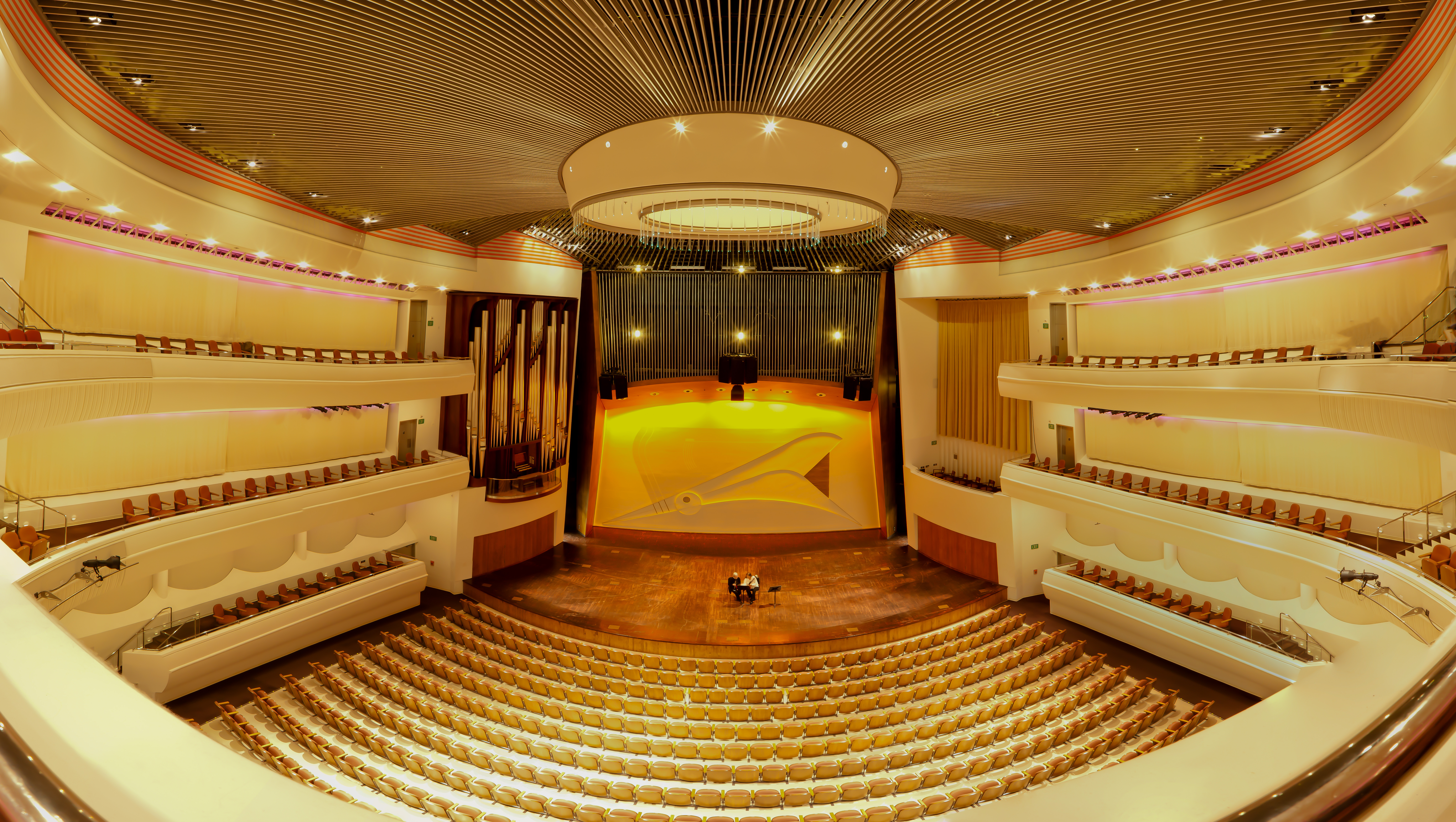
Cal Poly's Performing Arts Center

=== 21st century construction ===
In the summer of 2018, a dormitory-style student community was completed at the corner of Slack Street and Grand Avenue. This development includes seven 3- to 5-story concrete-framed freshman residence hall buildings with 1,475 beds and an adjacent four-level parking structure. Community spaces feature a café, community room, game room, mail room, welcome center, offices, and maintenance shop. Additional site improvements provide a large open space for activities and group events, volleyball and basketball courts, and outdoor gathering areas.

The Warren J. Baker Center for Science and Mathematics was dedicated on November 1, 2013. This $119 million, six-story building replaced the aging "spider" Science Building 52 with a new 189,000-square-foot structure. It includes laboratories, classrooms, offices for the physics, chemistry, and soil science programs, and spaces for the Western Coatings Technologies Center and the Environmental Biotechnology Institute. The center also features Centennial Park, a landscaped central green area.

The William and Linda Frost Center for Research and Innovation was dedicated on May 5, 2023. The 102,000-square-foot interdisciplinary research center features state-of-the-art interdisciplinary laboratory and teaching spaces for students and faculty in the Bailey College of Science and Mathematics; the College of Agriculture, Food and Environmental Sciences; and the College of Liberal Arts.

=== Commuting ===
Campus parking is limited, with 2,892 general-purpose parking spaces, 3,492 dorm resident spaces, and a total of 8,648 parking spaces. The Facilities Master Plan acknowledges that, despite adding more parking spots, the ratio of parking to students will decrease due to expected enrollment growth. To address this, the plan emphasizes reducing demand for individual vehicle parking by constructing additional dorms and enhancing campus life. Cal Poly Commuter and Access Services has successfully promoted alternatives to single occupancy vehicles, with bus use more than doubling and bicycle use nearly quadrupling from 2002 to 2012.

As of 2024, there are over 7,000 bike rack spaces and 252 secure bike lockers on campus. In 2019, approximately 57% of students and 33% of faculty/staff lived within five miles of campus, facilitating easy bike commutes. The city's SLO Transit bus system provides service to and from campus. Cal Poly supports SLO Transit with funding from parking citation revenue, allowing faculty, staff, and students to ride for free. The SLO Regional Transit Authority provides bus service throughout the county, with discounted passes available to the Cal Poly community.

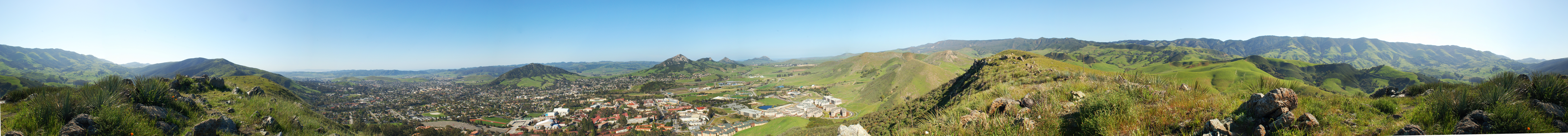
360° panorama from the top of Poly Canyon; the main Cal Poly campus and agricultural area can be seen below.

=== Leaning Pine Arboretum ===
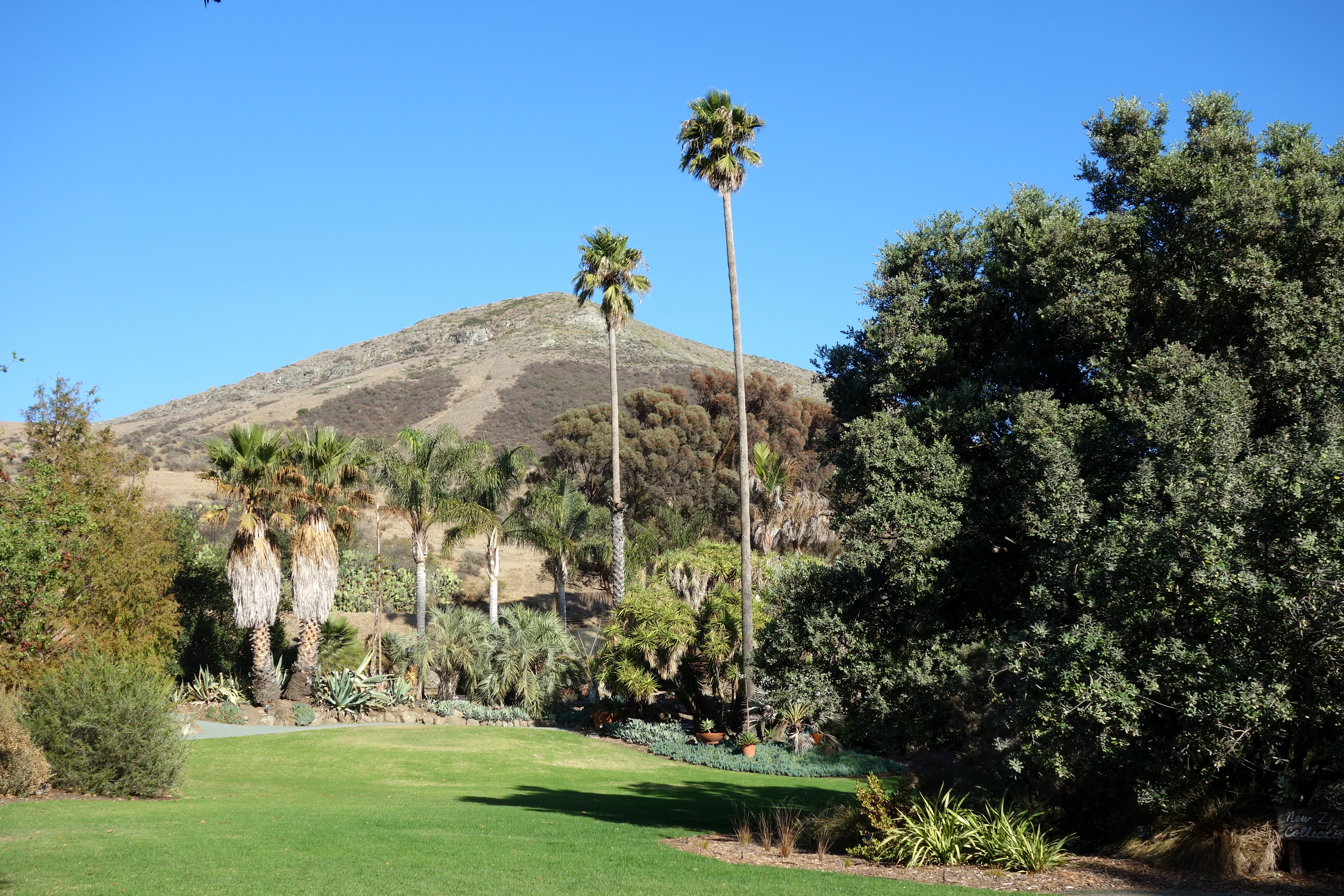
The Leaning Pine Arboretum, at Cal Poly SLO

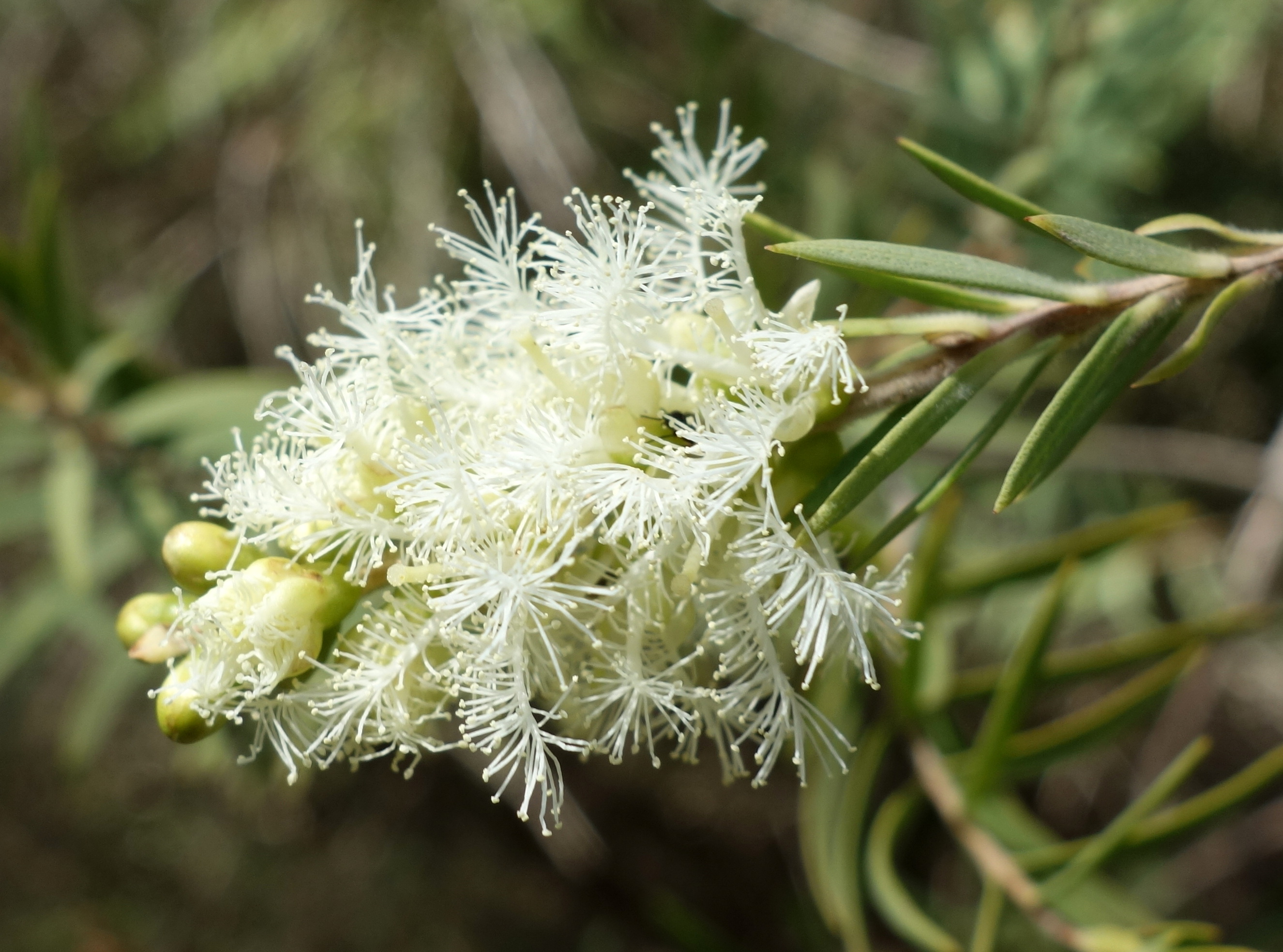
Snow-in-Summer in bloom, Leaning Pine Arboretum

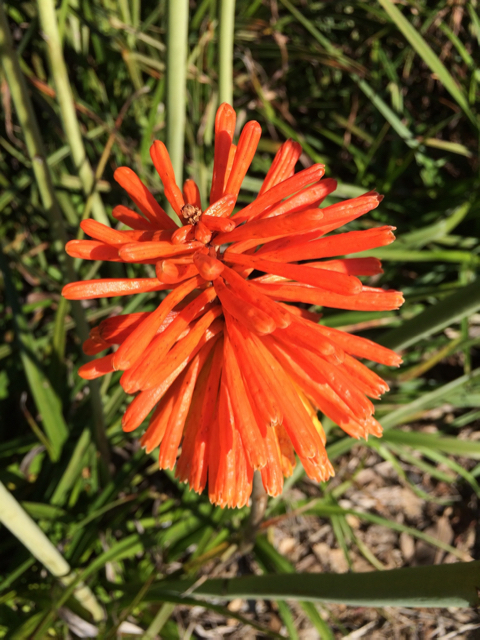
Kniphofia "Christmas Cheer"

The Leaning Pine Arboretum is located on 5 acres (20,000 m^{2}) on the north side of the campus. The arboretum is maintained by students. In 2022, the Arboretum received a one-million-dollar gift from a former Provost and her husband.

Collections are arranged primarily by nativity and feature a diverse array of trees, shrubs, and other landscape plants appropriate for the Central Coast of California region. The gardens display hundreds of plants, primarily from the Mediterranean forests, woodlands, and scrub Biome in the world's five Mediterranean climate regions located in areas of: Australia, California, Chile, the Mediterranean region, and South Africa. The arboretum also has a New Zealand garden, a dwarf and unusual conifer garden, a formal garden, and displays of cycads, palms, and succulents.

The arboretum is open from 8 a.m. to 5 p.m. Monday–Saturday. Admission is free.

== Academics ==
=== Colleges ===
As of 2020, the university offers 65 bachelor's degrees, 39 master's degrees, 84 minors and 13 credentials in six colleges:

- College of Agriculture, Food and Environmental Sciences
- College of Architecture and Environmental Design
- Orfalea College of Business
- College of Engineering
- College of Liberal Arts
- Bailey College of Science and Mathematics

=== Bachelor's projects ===
All undergraduate students are required to complete a senior project, a capstone experience integrating theory and application from their undergraduate studies. Projects may include design or construction experiences, experiments, self-guided studies or research projects, presentations, reports based on internships or co-ops, public portfolio displays, or performances. These projects often lead to job offers or recognition. Notable examples include Punchd, acquired by Google, and Jamba Juice, inspired by a senior project idea. The campus area known as 'Architecture Graveyard' hosts many senior projects, including experimental and unconventional structures.

=== Undergraduate admissions ===
Undergraduate admission statistics
	Fall 2025	Fall 2024	Fall 2023	Fall 2022	Fall 2021
First-time Freshmen
Applicants	71,185	68,604	63,955	58,944	54,570
Admits	21,243	21,416	18,964	17,885	18,008
Admit rate	30%	31%	30%	30%	33%
Enrolled	5,338	5,160	5,183	5,014	4,799
Yield rate	25%	24%	27%	28%	27%
Transfers
Applicants	10,761	10,429	9,212	9,107	11,041
Admits	2,144	2,039	1,949	1,806	1,957
Admit rate	20%	20%	21%	20%	18%
Enrolled	916	914	834	820	851
Yield rate	43%	45%	43%	45%	43%

Cal Poly's admissions process is described as "more selective" according to U.S. News & World Report. For the class entering fall 2025, 22,956 students were accepted out of a record 81,910 applicants, a 28% acceptance rate.

Cal Poly requires students to declare a major upon applying, then admits the most competitive applicants for each major. Each major has a change of major plan, requiring certain classes and GPA (usually between 2.5 and 2.75). In some cases, students wishing to change majors transfer to other universities.

For fall 2024, Cal Poly accepted 2,040 of 10,432 applicants as new transfer students, a 19.5% acceptance rate. In 2024, the incoming freshmen class was composed of approximately 50% women and 50% men.

For the 2024–2025 academic year, the middle 50% of enrolled students scored between 1240 and 1460 on the SAT (with a 50th percentile of 1350), between 610 and 740 on the SAT Evidence-Based Reading and Writing section (50th percentile: 670), and between 630 and 780 on the SAT Math section (50th percentile: 680).

=== Rankings ===
As of 2025, Cal Poly in San Luis Obispo has been ranked the best public institution in the Western United States for 33 consecutive years by U.S. News & World Report. The publication also ranked Cal Poly as the best overall master’s-level university — public or private — in the West for the third straight year. Regional universities offer a full range of undergraduate programs and some master's programs, but few doctoral programs.

U.S. News & World Report (2025)

- Regional Universities West - 1st
- Most Innovative Schools - 1st
- Best Undergraduate Teaching - 2nd
- Top Public Schools - 1st
- Best Colleges for Veterans - 1st
- Best Value Schools - 7th
  Academic rankings
  Master's
  - Washington Monthly: 32
  Regional
  - U.S. News & World Report: 1
  National
  - Forbes: 55
  - WSJ/College Pulse: 116
  Global
  - U.S. News & World Report: 1098 (tie)
- Engineering Programs - 5th
  - Computer - 1st
  - Aerospace / Aeronautical / Astronautical - 2nd
  - Civil - 2nd
  - Electrical / Electronic / Communications - 2nd
  - Mechanical - 2nd

National Rankings

The Wall Street Journal/College Pulse rankings (2026) - 28th best college in the country both public and private.

Forbes America's Top Colleges (2026) - 55th best college in America overall, 16th best public university.

PayScale Best Value Colleges Ranked by ROI (2025) - 36th out of 1,978.

Money Best Colleges for Your Money (2025) - 5 out of 5 star - Awarded America's Best Colleges.

Institute of International Education (2025) - #1 study aboard offerings across masters-level U.S. universities.

DesignIntelligence: America's Best Architecture & Design Schools:

- Undergraduate Architecture Programs - 3rd in the nation.
- Landscape Architecture - 6th in the nation, 1st in the western region.

== Student life ==
=== Student characteristics ===
2024 Undergraduate demographics
Race and ethnicity	Total
White	50%
Hispanic	23%
Asian	14%
Two or more races (Note: Other consists of Multiracial Americans & those who prefer to not say.)	11%
Foreign national	1%
Black	0.7%
Pacific Islander	0.3%
Native American	0.1%
Economic diversity
Low-income (Note: The percentage of students who received an income-based federal Pell grant intended for low-income students.)	14%
Affluent (Note: The percentage of students who are a part of the American middle class at the bare minimum.)	86%

=== Residence halls ===
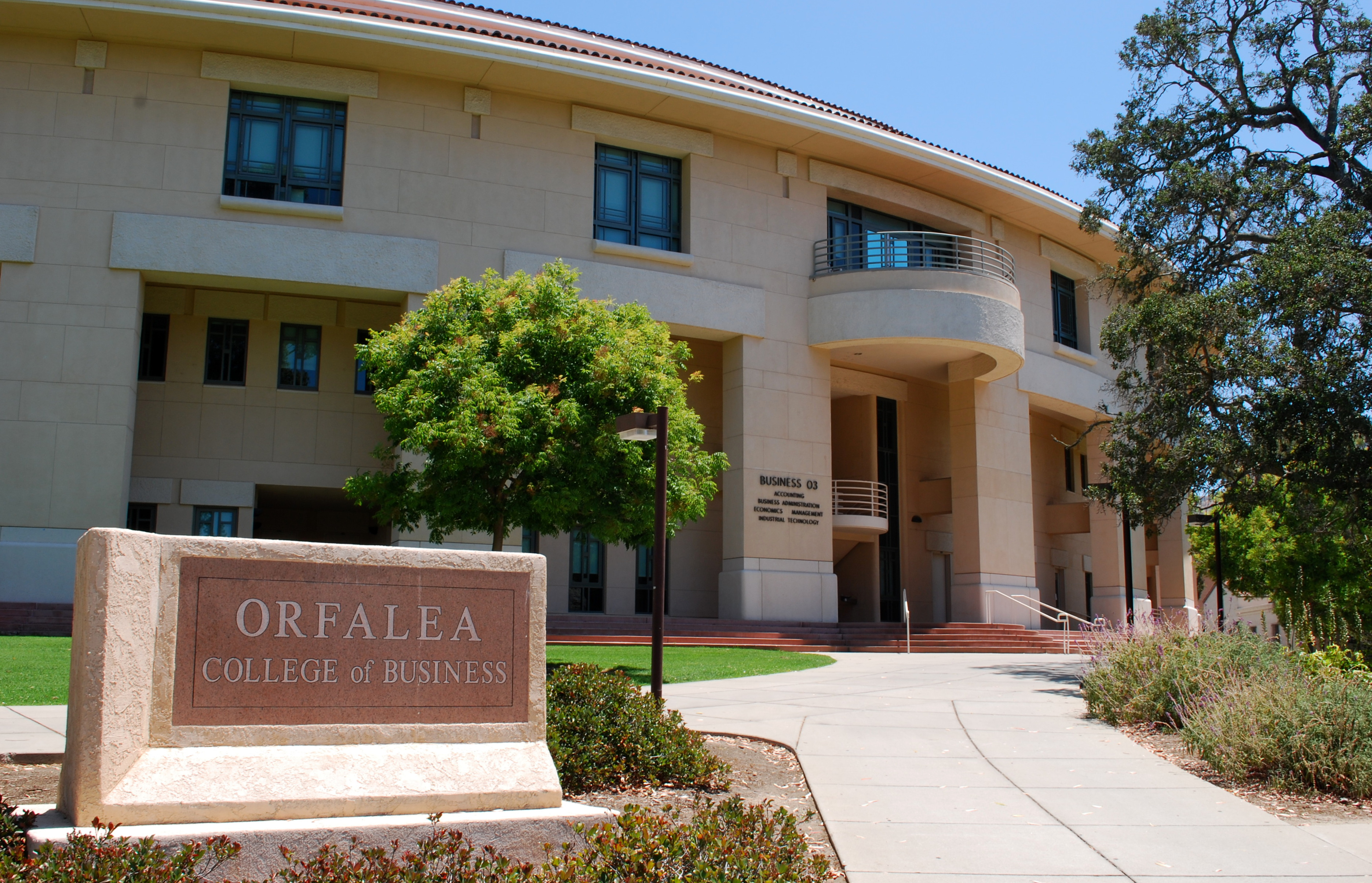
The Orfalea College of Business

Cal Poly's on-campus student housing, totaling 6,239 spaces, is the largest student housing program in the CSU system. In Fall 2015, 35.9% of undergraduates lived in 28 dorms, and 98.7% of first-time freshmen lived on campus. Additionally, 28.7% of sophomores lived on campus.

There are five distinct groups of residence halls: North Mountain Halls, Red-Brick Halls, Sierra Madre and Yosemite Halls, Cerro Vista Apartments, Poly Canyon Village, and Yakʔitʸutʸu residence halls

=== Greek life ===
Greek organizations have been present at Cal Poly since 1949, with numerous fraternities and sororities.

=== Week of Welcome orientation program ===
The Week of Welcome (WOW) is a volunteer-based orientation program for new students during the first week after move-in each September. It aims to introduce students to the campus and community and prepare them for a successful college career. Freshmen are placed in groups of 10–12, while transfer students are grouped in sizes of 40–60, each led by two current student orientation leaders. WOW groups participate in various orientation events and activities on and off campus. In 2010, the program's awareness section won the National Orientation Directors Association (NODAC) Media & Publications Showcase Award for Emerging Technologies, developed entirely by student volunteers. Started in 1956, WOW is now the largest volunteer orientation program in the nation.

=== Recreation Center ===
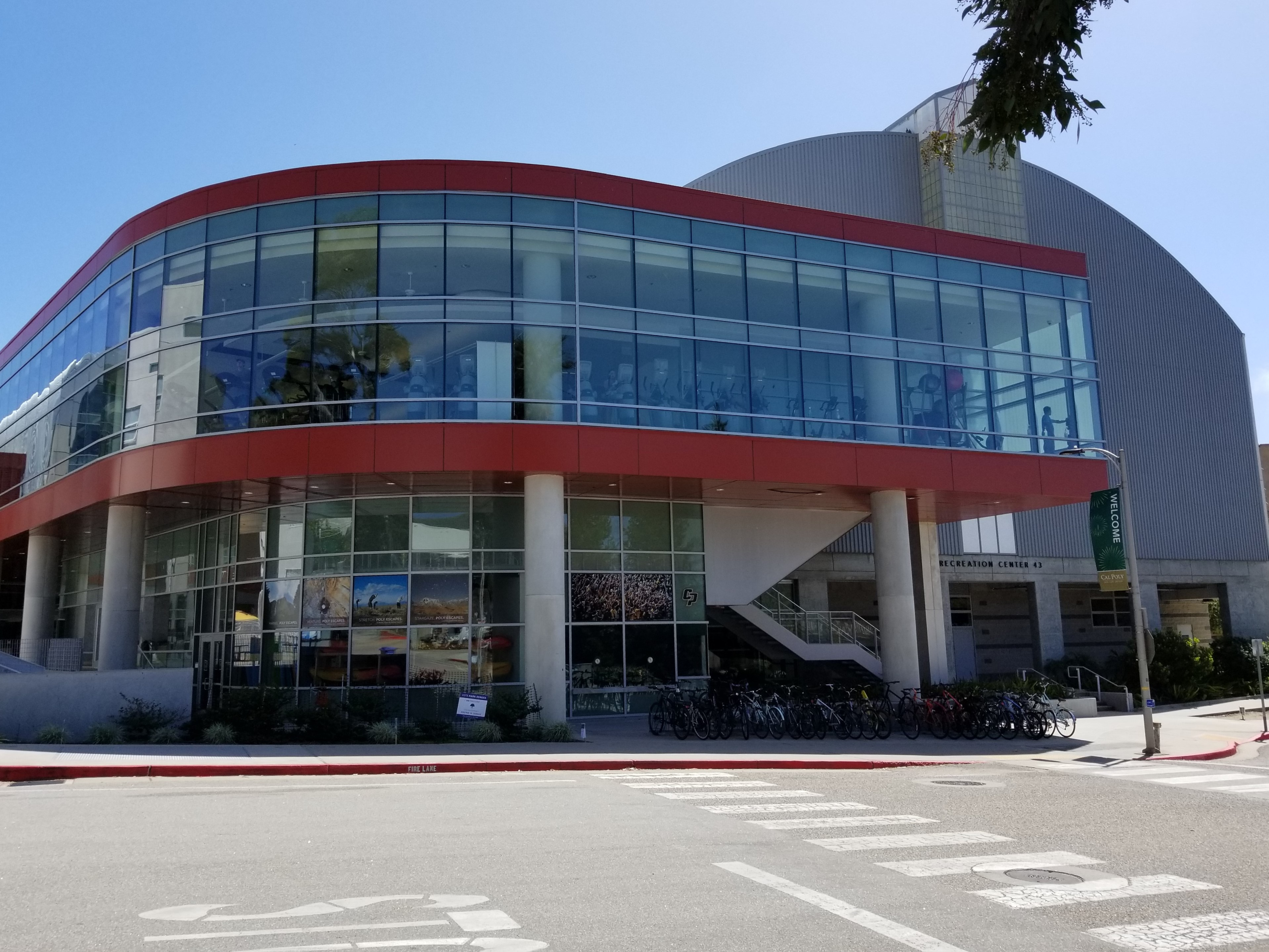
Cal Poly Recreation Center

The Cal Poly Recreation Center is the on-campus student recreation center.

=== Clubs and independent student organizations ===
Cal Poly hosts over 400 recognized clubs and independent student organizations, including cultural clubs, mathematics and science clubs, improv and sketch comedy clubs, religious and atheistic groups, service organizations, engineering research and development clubs, professional development organizations, a perennial Rose Parade Float design program, LGBTQ+ and Multicultural groups, competitive and social athletic teams, and academic honors clubs. Notable engineering clubs include Prove Lab, PolySat, CubeSat, and QL+.

== Athletics ==
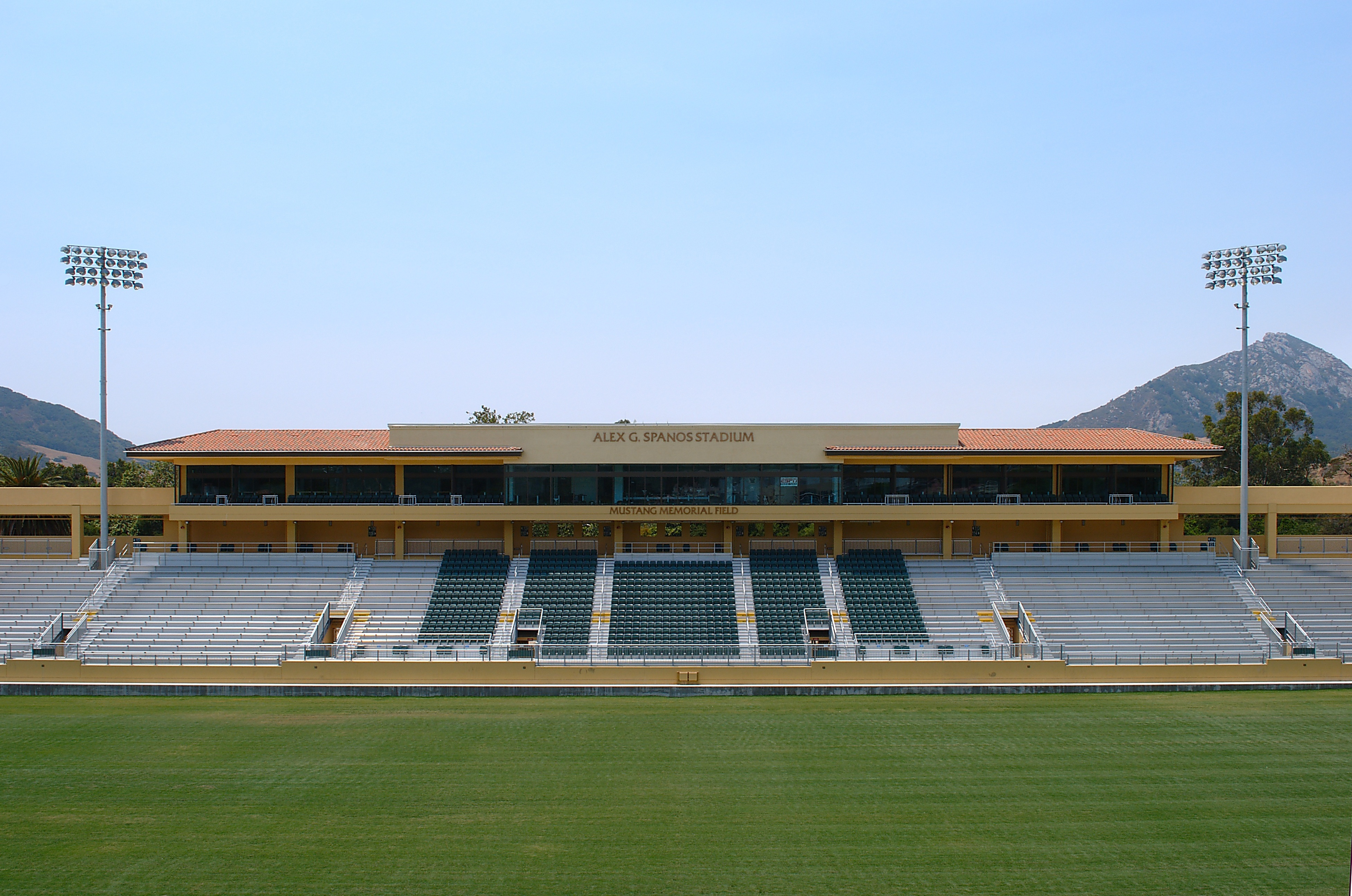
Alex G. Spanos Stadium

Cal Poly fields 20 sports (10 for men and 10 for women) and competes in NCAA Division I. It is a member of the Big West Conference, except for football, wrestling, and indoor track & field. The football team competes in the Big Sky Conference; the wrestling team is part of the Pac-12 Conference; and indoor track & field is independent.

Prior to joining Division I in 1994, Cal Poly won 35 NCAA Division II national team championships and competed in the California Collegiate Athletic Association. The university has two mascots: Musty the Mustang and Chase, a live mustang named after Margaret Chase, the university's second president.

=== Club sports ===
Cal Poly also offers various non-NCAA (club) sports. The Mustangs play college rugby in the California Conference of Division 1-A. The Mustangs are often ranked in the Top 25 nationwide, and their rugby sevens team has been ranked as high as No. 7. SLOCORE represents Cal Poly in ultimate at the D-1 open level. The Mustangs have been one of the top teams over the past decade, ranked as high as No. 5, and reached their first national final in 2024 while winning the team spirit award.

=== Rivalry and band ===
The Battle for the Golden Horseshoe is an annual rivalry college football game between the UC Davis Aggies and the Cal Poly Mustangs. The Mustang Marching Band, with over 200 members, performs at football, basketball, and volleyball games.

== Administrative organization ==
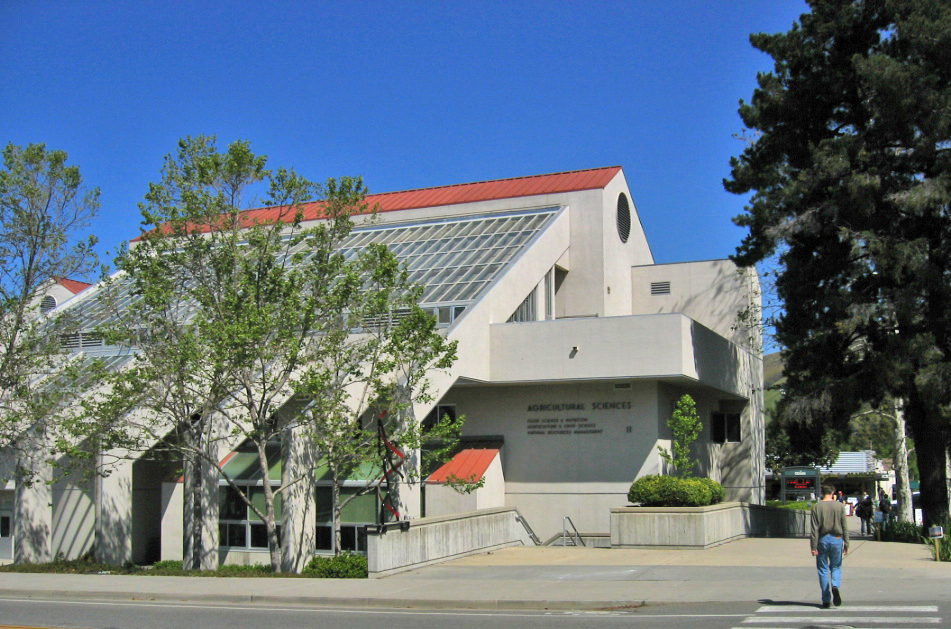
The Agricultural Sciences Building

Cal Poly is administratively organized into four divisions:

- Academic Affairs: Includes six colleges, Library, Research and Graduate Programs, and Information Technology Services.
- Student Affairs
- Administration and Finance
- University Advancement

=== University auxiliary organizations ===
Cal Poly Partners: A public-benefit nonprofit corporation providing commercial, fiscal, and support services to promote the educational mission of Cal Poly and the CSU system. Founded in 1940, it was known as the Cal Poly Foundation until 2006 and Cal Poly Corporation until 2024.

Cal Poly Foundation: An auxiliary organization and IRC 501(c)(3) public charity that accepts and administers tax-deductible gifts to the university. It leads campus philanthropic activity by supporting fundraising and managing campus endowments.

Cal Poly EPaCE: Cal Poly Extended, Professional and Continuing Education (EPaCE) provides access to Cal Poly and expands degree, certificate, and professional development opportunities for individuals through both academic and professional programs.

Associated Students Inc: The Associated Students Inc. (ASI) is a 501(c)(3) nnonprofit corporation owned and operated by Cal Poly student leaders, with an annual operating budget exceeding $12 million. ASI provides co-curricular experiences, including events, speakers, concerts, intramural sports, fitness programs, aquatics, outdoor adventure trips, craft center courses, club services, and child development programs. ASI manages the University Union, Recreation Center, Sports Complex, and Children's Center, totaling over 450,000 square feet of campus facilities.

Alumni Association: Engages and serves alumni, fostering lifelong connections between the university and its alumni, and supporting the university's mission. The association includes 15 regional and special interest chapters.

== Directors and presidents ==
- Leroy Anderson, 1902–1907
- Leroy Burns Smith, 1908–1914
- Robert Weir Ryder, 1914–1921
- Nicholas Ricciardi, 1921–1924
- Margaret Chase (Acting), 1924
- Benjamin Ray Crandall, 1924–1933
- Julian A. McPhee, 1933–1966
- Dale W. Andrews (acting), 1966–1967
- Robert E. Kennedy, 1967–1979
- Warren J. Baker, 1979–2010
- Robert Glidden (Acting), 2010–2011
- Jeffrey D. Armstrong, 2011–present

== Notable alumni ==
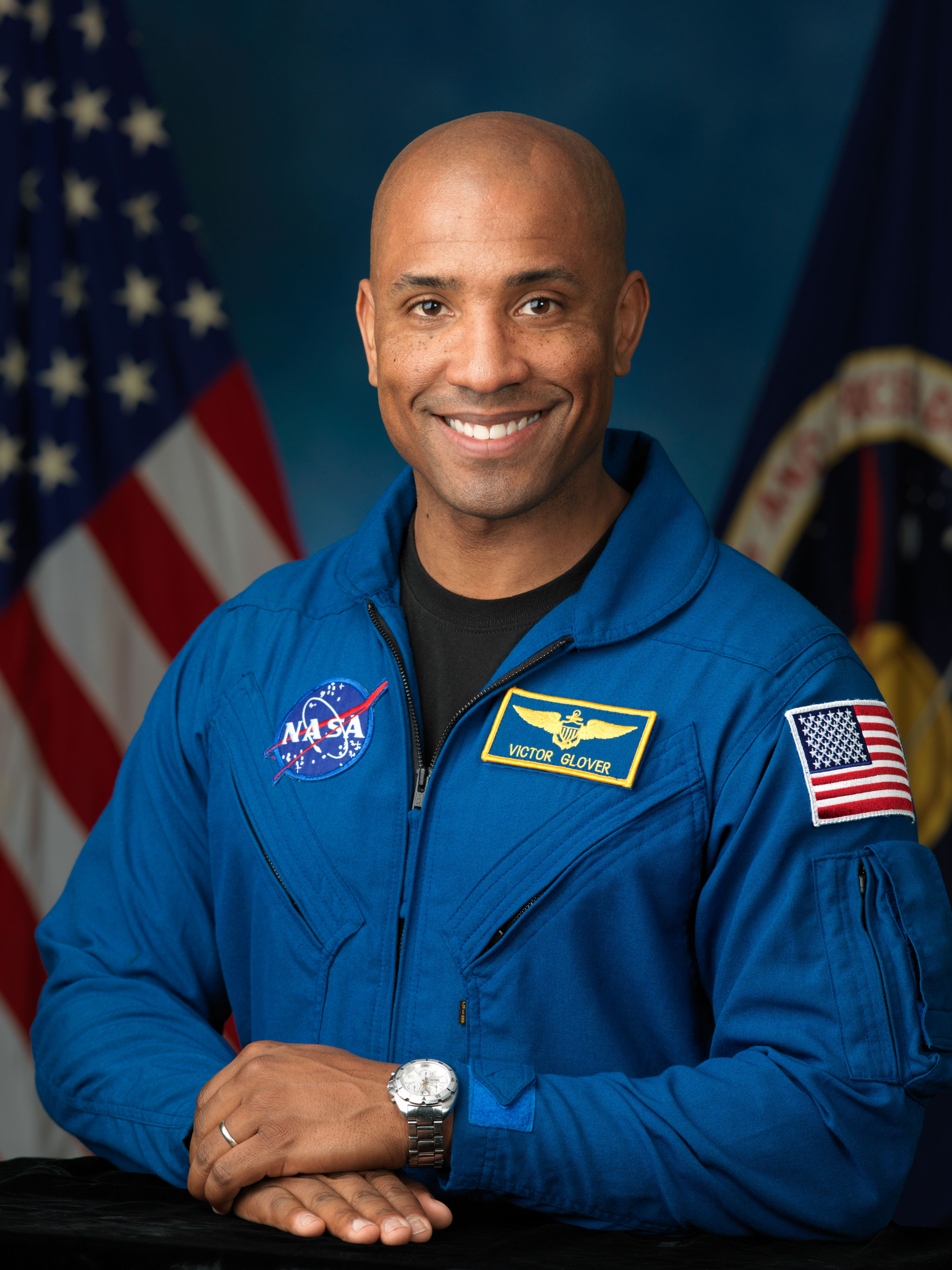
Victor Glover

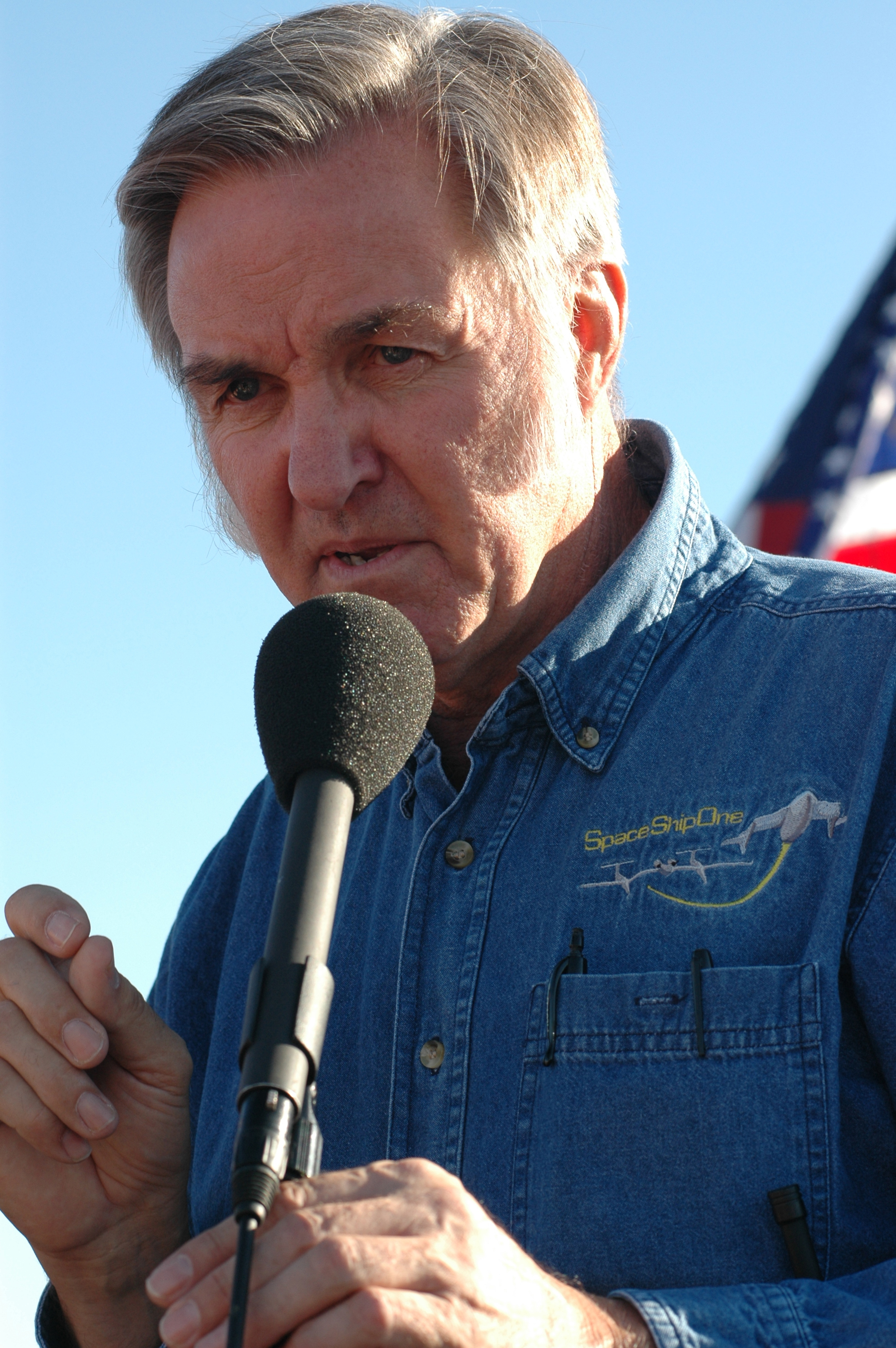
Burt Rutan

Tory Bruno

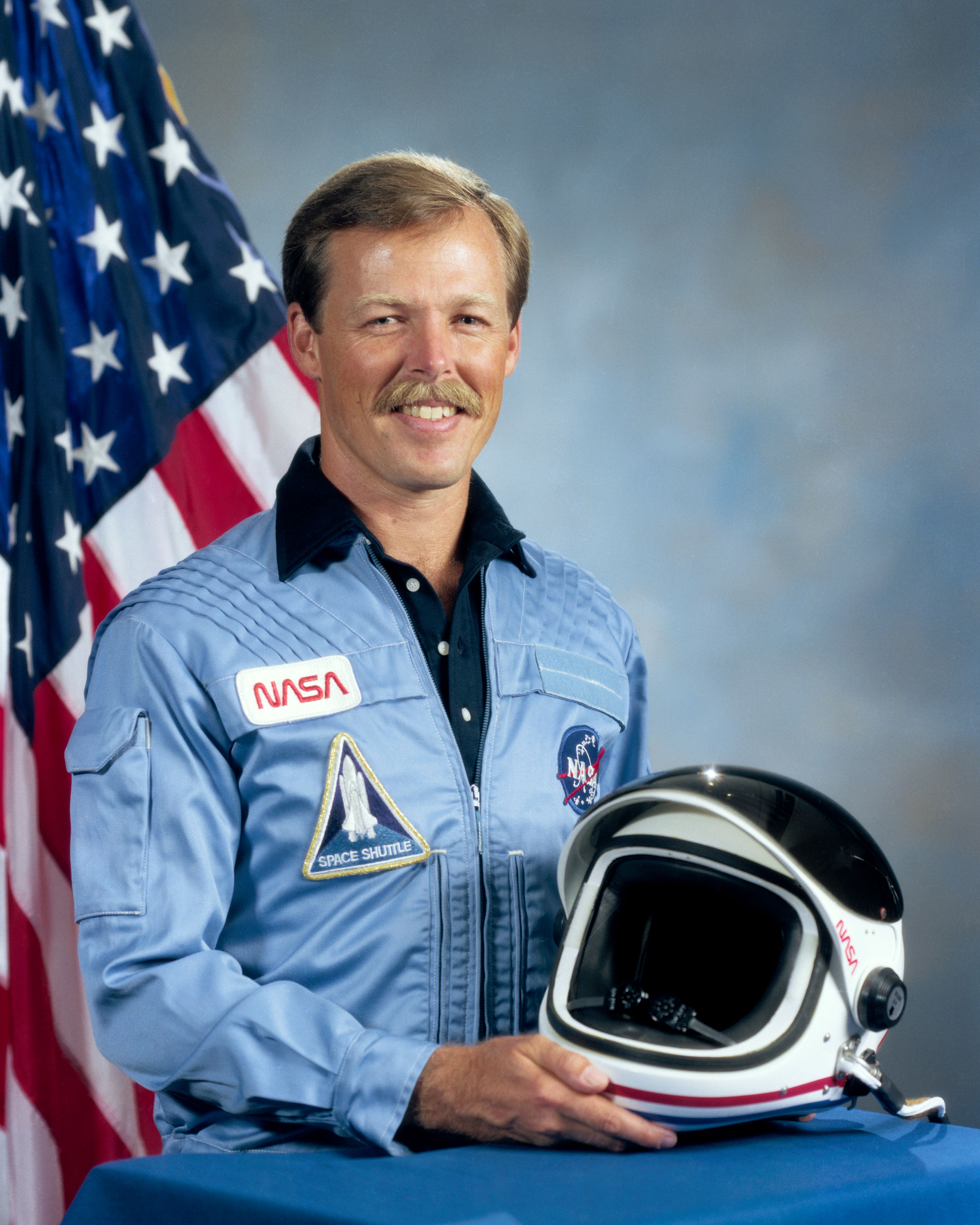
Robert L. Gibson

Gregory Chamitoff

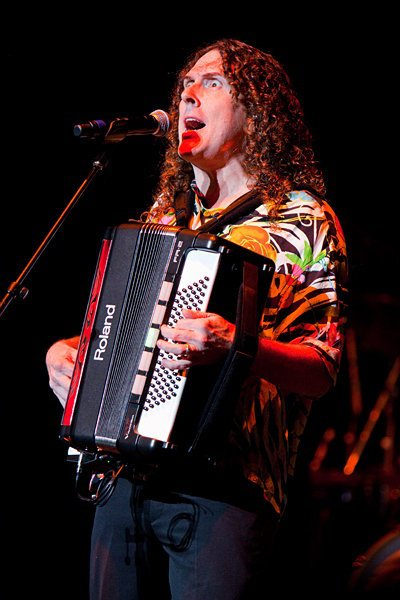
"Weird Al" Yankovic

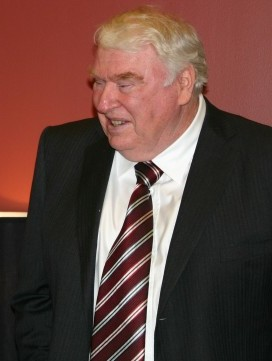
John Madden

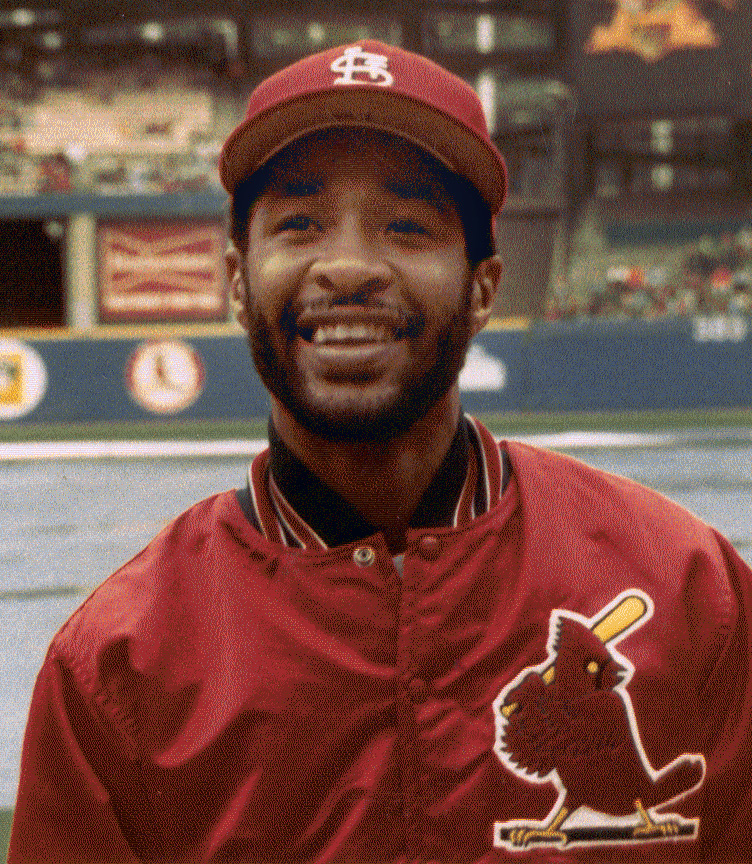
Ozzie Smith

Notable people who attended Cal Poly include:

- "Weird Al" Yankovic, musician and comedian
- John Madden, Pro Football Hall of Fame coach and broadcaster
- Tory Bruno, former president and CEO of United Launch Alliance
- William H. Swanson, former chairman and CEO of Raytheon Company
- Peter Oppenheimer, former chief financial officer of Apple Inc.
- Aaron Peckham, founder of Urban Dictionary
- Kirk Perron, founder of Jamba
- Alex Pryor and David Karr, co-founders of Guayakí Yerba Mate
- Joel Flory, co-founder of VSCO
- Kyle Wiens, co-founder and CEO of iFixit
- Noel Lee, founder of Monster
- Farzad Nazem, former chief technology officer of Yahoo!
- Steve Abernethy, co-founder and former CEO of SquareTrade
- Danny Bragonier, co-founder of BetterHelp
- Abdul Aziz Al Ghurair, chairman of Mashreq
- Danding Cojuangco, former chairman and CEO of San Miguel Corporation
- Burt Rutan, aerospace engineer and designer of SpaceShipOne
- Victor Glover, NASA astronaut and pilot of Artemis II
- Robert "Hoot" Gibson, former NASA astronaut
- Gregory Chamitoff, former NASA astronaut
- Rick Sturckow, former NASA astronaut and commercial spaceflight test pilot
- Michael Alsbury, Scaled Composites and Virgin Galactic test pilot
- Tim Geistlinger, biochemist who led development of the Beyond Burger
- Ozzie Smith, Baseball Hall of Fame shortstop
- Chuck Liddell, former UFC Light Heavyweight Champion
- Mike Krukow, former MLB pitcher and San Francisco Giants broadcaster
- Devin Nunes, former member of the United States House of Representatives
- Doug LaMalfa (1960–2026), former member of the United States House of Representatives
- Abel Maldonado, former Lieutenant Governor of California

== Listing as a census-designated place ==
California Polytechnic State University CDP
- Census-designated place
- Location within California Location within the United States
- Coordinates: 35°18′19″N 120°39′56″W
- Country: United States
- State: California
- County: San Luis Obispo

Area
  - Total: 1.548 sq mi (4.01 km^{2})
  - Land: 1.539 sq mi (3.99 km^{2})
  - Water: 0 sq mi (0 km^{2})
- Elevation: 325 ft (99 m)

Population (2020)
  - Total: 8,583
  - Density: 5,577/sq mi (2,153/km^{2})
- Time zone: UTC-8 (Pacific)
  - Summer (DST): UTC-7 (PDT)
- FIPS code: 06-09835
- GNIS feature ID: 2805238

The United States Census Bureau, has designated the campus as a separate census-designated place (CDP) for statistical purposes, under the name California Polytechnic State University. It first appeared as a CDP in the 2020 Census with a population of 8,583.

Historical population
Census	Pop.	Note	%±
2020	8,583		—
U.S. Decennial Census; 1850–1870 1880-1890; 1900 1910 1920; 1930 1940 1950; 1960 1970 1980; 1990 2000 2010 2020

=== 2020 census ===
California Polytechnic State University CDP, California – Racial and ethnic composition Note: the US Census treats Hispanic/Latino as an ethnic category. This table excludes Latinos from the racial categories and assigns them to a separate category. Hispanics/Latinos may be of any race.
Race / Ethnicity (NH = Non-Hispanic)	Pop 2020	% 2020
White alone (NH)	5,499	64.07%
Black or African American alone (NH)	169	1.97%
Native American or Alaska Native alone (NH)	4	0.05%
Asian alone (NH)	1,196	13.93%
Native Hawaiian or Pacific Islander alone (NH)	1	0.01%
Other race alone (NH)	148	1.72%
Mixed race or Multiracial (NH)	256	2.98%
Hispanic or Latino (any race)	1,310	15.26%
Total	8,583	100.00%

== See also ==
- California Master Plan for Higher Education
