= California State Polytechnic University, Pomona =

Public university in Pomona, California, US

- Former names: California Polytechnic School Voorhis Unit (1938–1956); California Polytechnic School Kellogg-Voorhis Unit (1956–1966); California State Polytechnic College, Kellogg-Voorhis (1966–1972)
- Motto: Discere Faciendo (Latin)
- Motto in English: "Learn by Doing"
- Type: Public polytechnic university
- Established: 1938; 88 years ago
- Parent institution: California State University
- Accreditation: WSCUC
- Academic affiliations: Space-grant
- Endowment: $203.8 million (2025)
- President: Vanya Quiñones
- Provost: Terri Gomez
- Faculty: 1,512 (fall 2021)
- Students: 27,196 (fall 2024)
- Undergraduates: 25,255 (fall 2024)
- Postgraduates: 1,941 (fall 2024)
- Location: Pomona, California, United States; 34°03′23″N 117°49′18″W
- Campus: 1,438 acres (582 ha); Large suburb
- Newspaper: The Poly Post
- Colors: Green and gold
- Nickname: Broncos
- Sporting affiliations: NCAA Division II – CCAA
- Mascot: Billy Bronco
- Website: cpp.edu
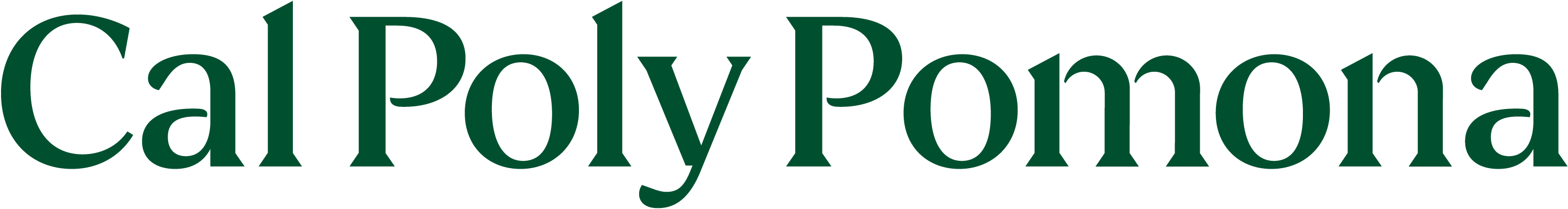

California State Polytechnic University, Pomona (Cal Poly Pomona) is a public polytechnic research university in Pomona, California, United States. Designated R2, Doctoral Universities – High Research Activity. It is the largest of the three polytechnic universities in the California State University system by enrollment.

Cal Poly Pomona began as a southern campus of the California Polytechnic School (now known as Cal Poly San Luis Obispo) in 1938, following the donation of the Voorhis School for Boys and its adjacent farm in San Dimas by Charles and Jerry Voorhis. This Pomona campus expanded in 1949 when it was gifted the W.K. Kellogg Institute of Animal Husbandry from the University of California, which was originally Will Keith Kellogg's horse ranch. Cal Poly Kellogg-Voorhis and Cal Poly San Luis Obispo continued operations under unified administrative control until 1966, when Cal Poly Pomona was formed as an independent university.

Cal Poly Pomona currently offers bachelor's degrees in 94 majors, 39 master's degree programs, 13 teaching credentials, and a doctorate across nine distinct academic colleges. The university is one among a small group of polytechnic universities in the United States which tend to be primarily devoted to the instruction of technical arts and applied sciences. Cal Poly, Pomona is a Hispanic-serving institution (HSI) and is eligible to be designated as an Asian American Native American Pacific Islander serving institution (AANAPISI).

Its sports teams are known as the Cal Poly Pomona Broncos and play in the NCAA Division II as part of the California Collegiate Athletic Association (CCAA). The Broncos sponsor 10 varsity sports and have won 14 NCAA national championships. Current and former Cal Poly Pomona athletes have won 7 Olympic medals (3 gold, 1 silver, and 3 bronze).

== History ==
Let it be the Cornell of the Pacific... where any person can find instruction in any study.

— Myron Angel, founder of the California Polytechnic School, San Luis Obispo, California. January 7, 1899.

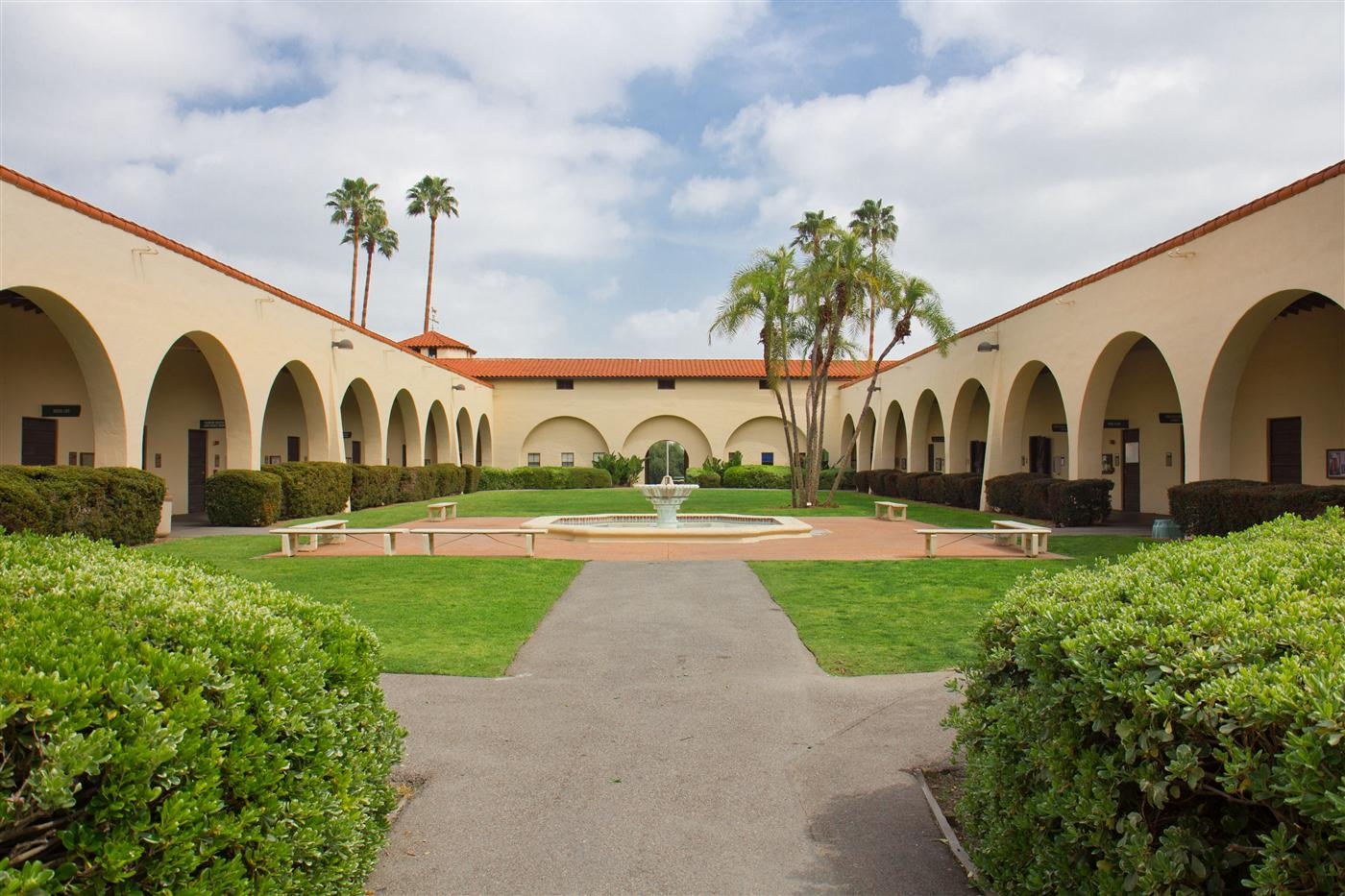
Old horse stables

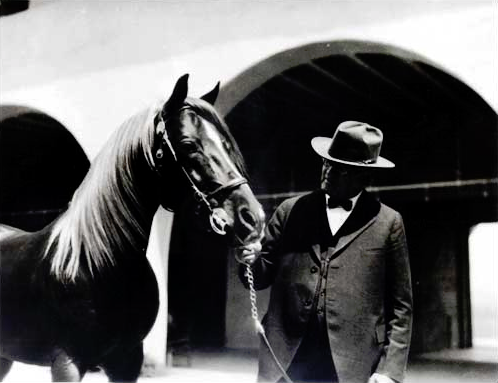
Cal Poly Pomona stands on the former Arabian horse ranch of cereal magnate W.K. Kellogg.

Events leading to the foundation of present-day Cal Poly Pomona began with the ending of the Voorhis School for Boys near Walnut Creek in San Dimas, California, and its acquisition by the San Luis Obispo–based California Polytechnic School in 1938.

The California Polytechnic School (Cal Poly San Luis Obispo) was founded as a vocational high school when California Governor Henry Gage signed the Polytechnic School Bill on March 8, 1901, after its drafting by school founder Myron Angel. Voorhis School, on the other hand, had been established in 1928 as a private vocational school which provided elementary schooling for underprivileged boys and operated under the Christian religious principle, "education coupled with the Kingdom of God". Its founder Charles B. Voorhis and headmaster Jerry Voorhis maintained the school opened throughout the worst years of the Great Depression but persistent economic pressures forced them to transfer control to Cal Poly in San Luis Obispo in 1938.

Voorhis School became the Cal Poly-Voorhis Unit and its educational offerings were raised to the same level as Cal Poly in San Luis Obispo's, then a two-year college. The horticulture program was moved to the new satellite campus and the two units operated as one institution spanning two locations under the leadership of president Julian McPhee.

During World War II most of the student body was called to active military duty; enrollment declined and the campus closed in 1943. Reopening after the war, Cal Poly-Voorhis Unit operated in San Dimas until 1956 when it moved to Will Keith Kellogg’s former horse ranch in the neighboring city of Pomona, California. Acknowledging its Kellogg legacy, Cal Poly-Voorhis Unit changed its name to Cal Poly Kellogg-Voorhis Unit and offered six programs in agriculture. The inaugural class of 1957 at the new campus consisted of 57 students graduating with bachelor's degrees in a ceremony held at the Rose Garden in Pomona and religious services at Voorhis Chapel in San Dimas. Also in 1957, Cal Poly Kellogg-Voorhis introduced the College of Engineering, the second academic unit after the College of Agriculture. The California Master Plan for Higher Education added the two Cal Poly campuses to the new California State College system in 1961 and Cal Poly Kellogg-Voorhis Unit opened its doors for the first time to 329 female students. President McPhee retired in 1966, and Cal Poly split into two different and independent universities. The partnership between the two campuses remains with their involvement in the annual Cal Poly Universities Rose Float.

To better reflect its new ties to the California State College system, Cal Poly Kellogg-Voorhis changed its name to "California State Polytechnic College, Kellogg-Voorhis" in 1966 and became the 16th campus to officially join the CSC system. Robert C. Kramer assumed presidency of the independent campus in 1966 (second overall as the university recognizes McPhee as its first) and California State Polytechnic College, Kellogg-Voorhis finally adopted its present-day name California State Polytechnic University, Pomona on June 1, 1972.

In 1998, Cal Poly Pomona received criticism when it planned to grant an honorary degree to Robert Mugabe. Mugabe's negative humanitarian record as president of Zimbabwe led to protests from staff, faculty and students, ultimately forcing the university to rescind the plan.

Cal Poly Pomona underwent further growth in the late 20th and early 21st centuries, with the construction of the CLA Building (demolished in 2022), academic facilities, expansion to the Cal Poly Pomona University Library and the addition of programs such as the Lyle Center for Regenerative Studies, the I-Poly High School and the U.R. Bronco undergraduate research program. Under then-president J. Michael Ortiz, Cal Poly Pomona launched its first comprehensive capital campaign in fall of 2008 to increase its permanent endowment. Nevertheless, the negative economic effects caused by the late-2000s recession resulted in increased student fees, reduced enrollment availability, eliminated two athletic programs and introduced a mandatory furlough calendar for most of its employees.

In April 2024, CPP students joined other campuses across the United States in protests against the humanitarian crisis and genocide in Gaza.

=== Name ===
The university is officially known as "California State Polytechnic University, Pomona" and "Cal Poly Pomona", and is also referred to as "CPP". The name "Cal Poly" is protected by trademark and state statute exclusively for California Polytechnic State University in San Luis Obispo. Referring to Cal Poly Pomona simply as "Cal Poly" can cause confusion. To honor each institution's unique identity and ensure clear communication, Cal Poly Pomona's Office of Public Affairs recommends using "Cal Poly Pomona" or "CPP" when mentioning the university. This practice recognizes Cal Poly Pomona as an independent and respected institution with distinct strengths within the California State University (CSU) system.

Former seals and logos

Former seal used by the university during the University of California years (1932–1943)

Former seal used by the university from the mid-1980s to 2018

Former seal used by the university from 2018 to 2025

== Campus ==
Cal Poly Pomona is located about 30 miles east of Downtown Los Angeles.

Cal Poly Pomona is located partially within the limits of Pomona, a largely suburban city that is part of the Los Angeles metropolitan area. The city of Pomona is located in the eastern portion of Los Angeles County and borders the neighboring county of San Bernardino to the east. The university's 1,725 acres (698 ha) campus make it the second largest in the California State University system, a figure which includes various facilities scattered throughout Southern California such as a 53-acre (21 ha) ranch in Santa Paula, California, 25-acre (10 ha) campus at the former Spadra Landfill (now known as "Spadra Ranch"), and the Neutra VDL Studio and Residences in Silver Lake, Los Angeles. The university is currently negotiating the transfer of the 302 acre Lanterman Developmental Center from the State of California. The land is to be used for academic purposes and expansion of the Innovation Village and also shared by the California Highway Patrol, the California Air Resources Board and the California Conservation Corps.

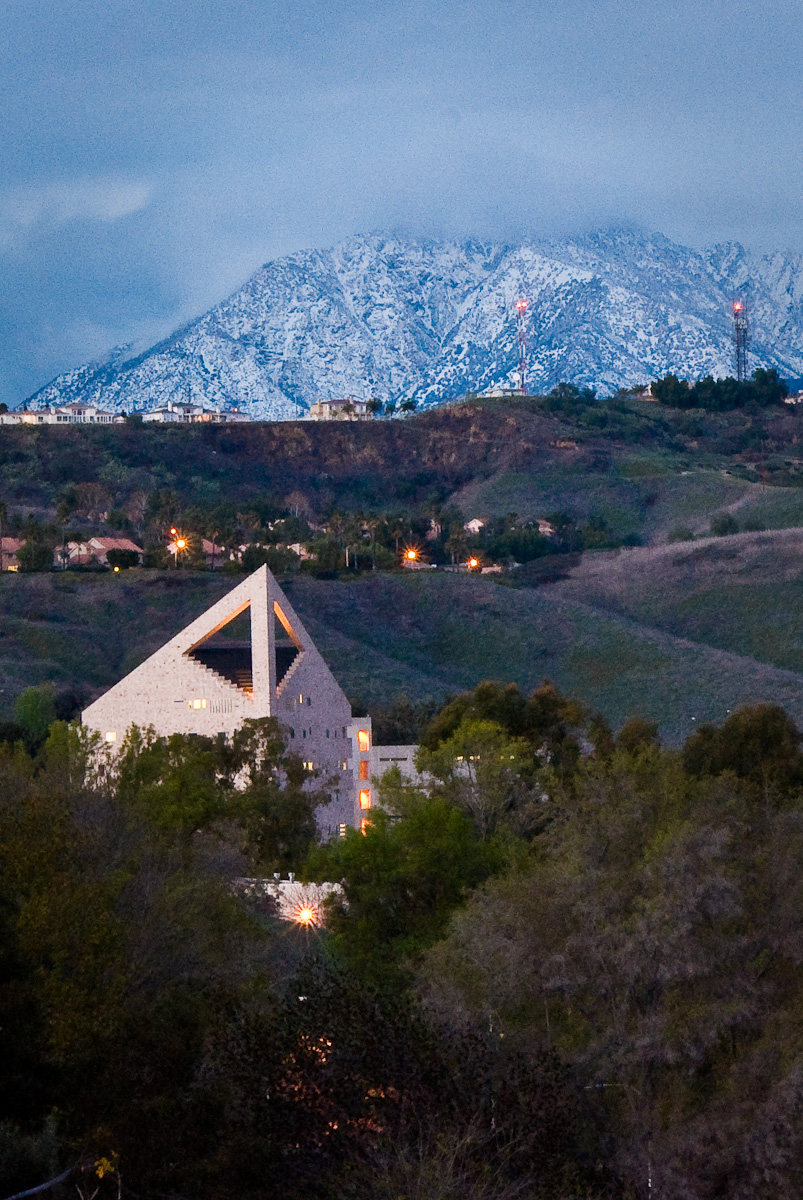
Aerial view of campus

Although part of the Los Angeles metropolitan area, the university is in close proximity to two other large metropolitan and culturally defined regions, the Inland Empire and Orange County. The university has a tier 1 area, defined as a geographical admissions region surrounding the campus, roughly bounded by the San Gabriel Mountains to the north, the city of Chino Hills to the south, Interstate 605 to the west, and Interstate 15 to the east. Cal Poly Pomona's campus buildings vary in age and style from the Mission Revival Kellogg Horse Stables and the Kellogg House (suggesting the Spanish colonial architectural heritage of Southern California) built in the 1920s; the modernist box-like portion of the library completed in 1969; to contemporary dormitories, engineering, science and library-expansion facilities completed in the early 21st century. Manor House serves as the official residence of the university president.

Leisure and recreational locations include a rose garden which dates back to the Kellogg horse ranch years; the Kellogg House designed by Los Angeles-based architects Charles Gibbs Adams, Myron Hunt and Harold Coulson Chambers in the 1920s; and a 1.3 acres (0.53 ha) Japanese garden built in 2003 and designed by Takeo Uesugi. Kellogg's House features grounds which were initially landscaped by Charles Gibbs Adams but were later completed by Florence Yoch & Lucile Council. Cal Poly Pomona's George and Sakaye Aratani Japanese Garden is one among three under management by institutions of higher education in the County of Los Angeles, the others being the Earl Burns Miller Japanese Garden at Cal State Long Beach, and the Shinwa-En Garden at Cal State Dominguez Hills. At the center of the campus and atop Horsehill are the buildings of the Collins College of Hospitality Management and Kellogg West, a hotel and conference center and home of the student/faculty-run Restaurant at Kellogg Ranch.

At the northwest part of the campus is the Voorhis Ecological Reserve, which serves as a 31 hectares (77 acres) wildlife corridor containing Coastal Sage Scrub and Coast Live Oak trees among others. Contrasting some of these architecturally prominent facilities, there are various portable buildings on campus which are used to accommodate the growing enrollment of recent decades. Cal Poly Pomona operates the International Polytechnic High School, a college preparatory high school located on campus.

The letters "CPP" made of concrete are located on Colt Hill overlooking the campus. The letters "CP" were initially added in 1959, with the second "P" added in 2004 to distinguish it from the Cal Poly campus in San Luis Obispo.

Between 1993 and 2022, Cal Poly Pomona's dominant landmark was a futurist-styled administrative facility known as the CLA Building which was designed by Antoine Predock and opened in 1993. The building's peculiar shape (standing out by a triangular-shaped "skyroom" atop its eight-story tower) became a symbol of the university; in addition, its close location to film studios based in the Hollywood borough of Los Angeles have prompted its inclusion in motion pictures such as Gattaca and Impostor. In 2013, the California State University Board of Trustees voted to demolish the building and replace it with a new academic/faculty complex because of severe seismic risks, as determined when now reviewed in the context of more recent seismic research than was required by building codes at the time of its original design and building permit. Despite the fact that numerous other buildings on the CPP campus are much older, which brings into question their adequacy as they too sit on the same presumed fault line, only the CLA building was to be completely demolished by the end of summer 2022.

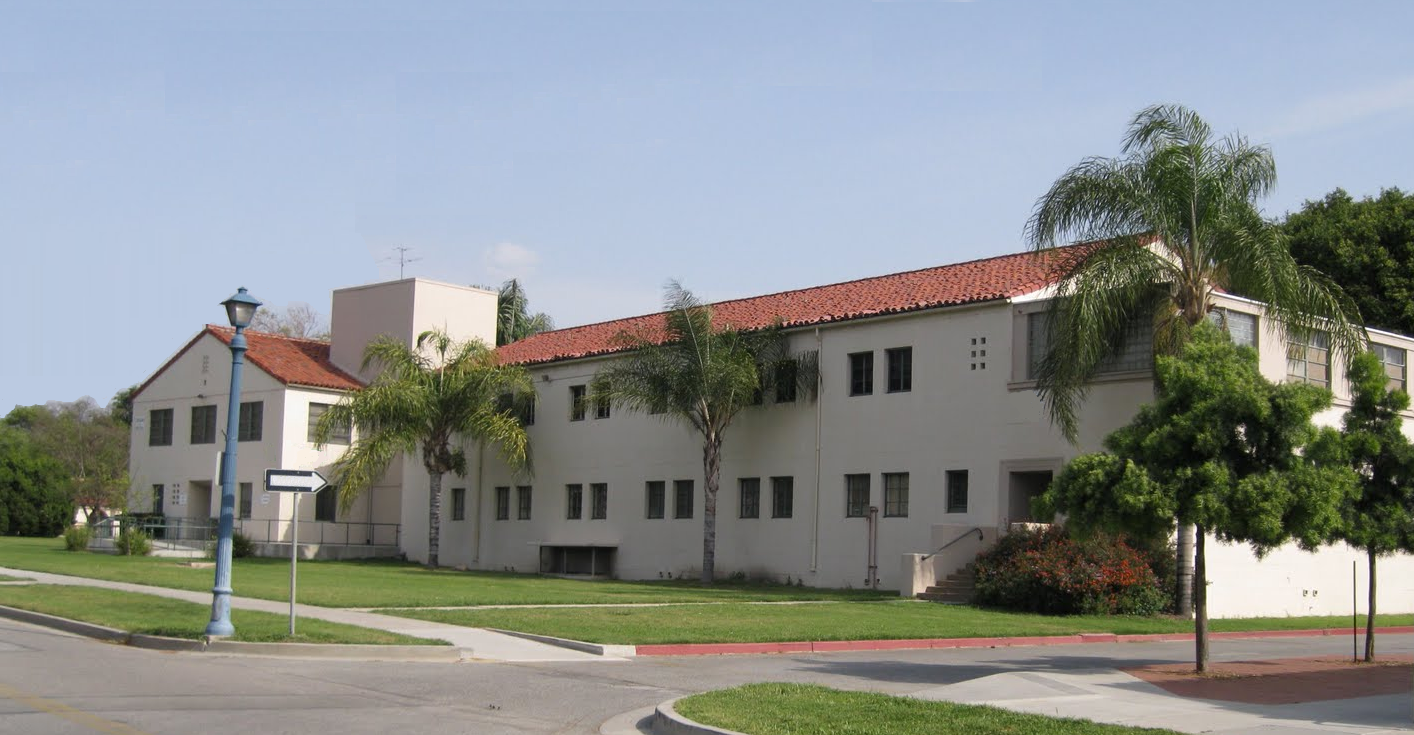
Cal Poly Pomona's new South Campus

Noted modernist architect James Pulliam once served as campus architect and instructor and designed the Bookstore, W. Keith and Janet Kellogg Art Gallery, Interim Design Center (IDC) and Student Union building which architectural historian David Gebhard regarded as the best building on campus.

=== Academic and research facilities ===
The W. K. Kellogg Arabian Horse Center is an academic and research facility serving one of the 22 terms and conditions to the donation of the Kellogg ranch by maintaining Kellogg's purebred Arabian horses and their breeding program. Another academic facility highlighting the Kellogg legacy is the Horse Stables (also known as University Plaza) which contains a small research library specializing in equine studies along with offices for student services and various campus organizations.

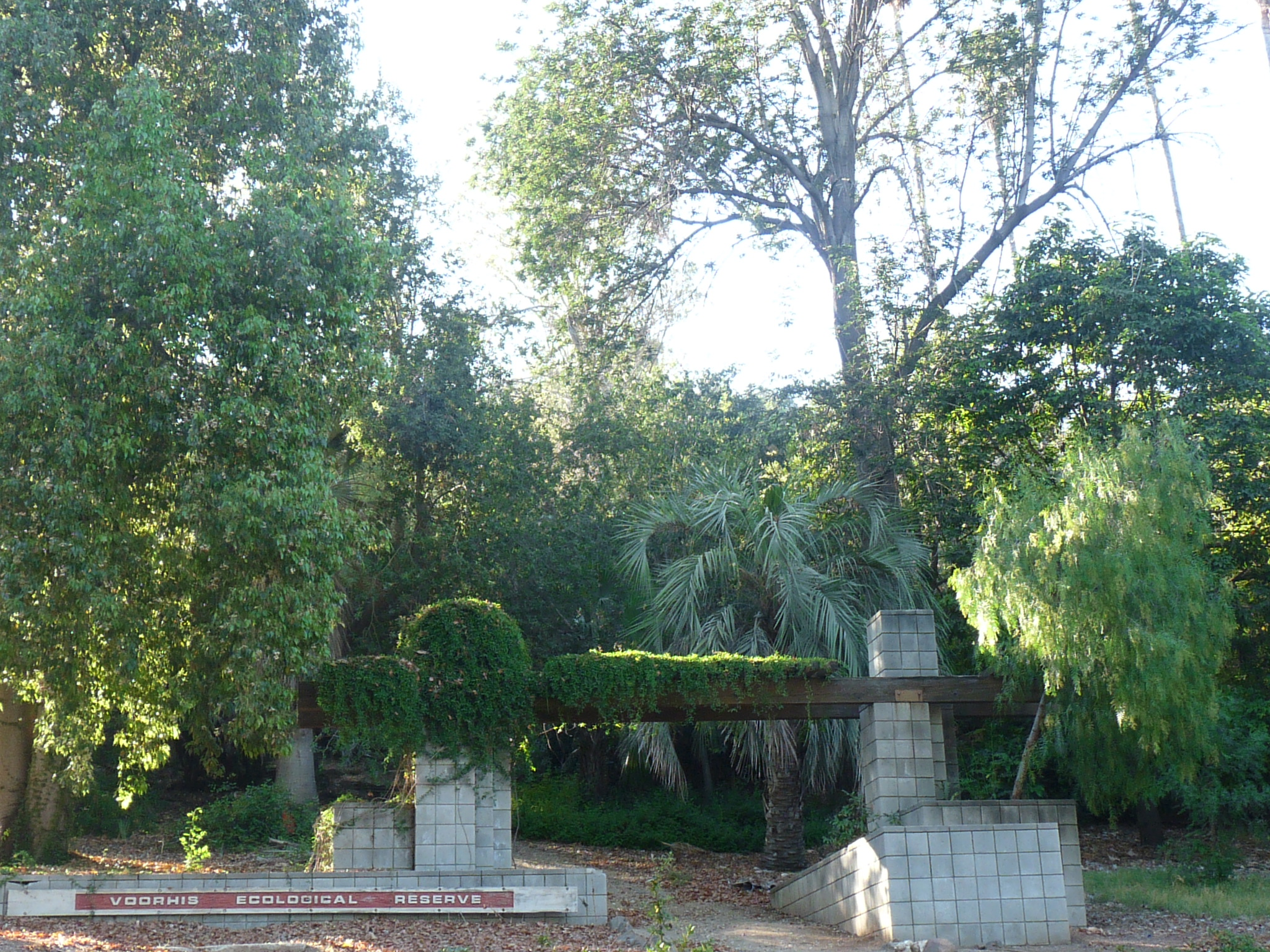
Cal Poly Pomona's Voorhis Ecological Reserve

Conceived in 1995 by then university president, Bob H. Suzuki, and initially financed by NASA and the Economic Development Administration, the Innovation Village is a 65-acre (26 ha) public/private partnership research and business facility at the southern edge of the campus. Major tenants include the American Red Cross, Southern California Edison, and the NASA Commercialization Center. The project is currently at the halfway mark of building and leasing 1,000,000 square feet (93,000 m^{2}) of the projected total building space. Once complete, it is estimated that the project would employ 2000 to 3000 people and provide half a billion dollars of economic benefits to the local, regional and state economies.

=== Campus sustainability and transportation ===
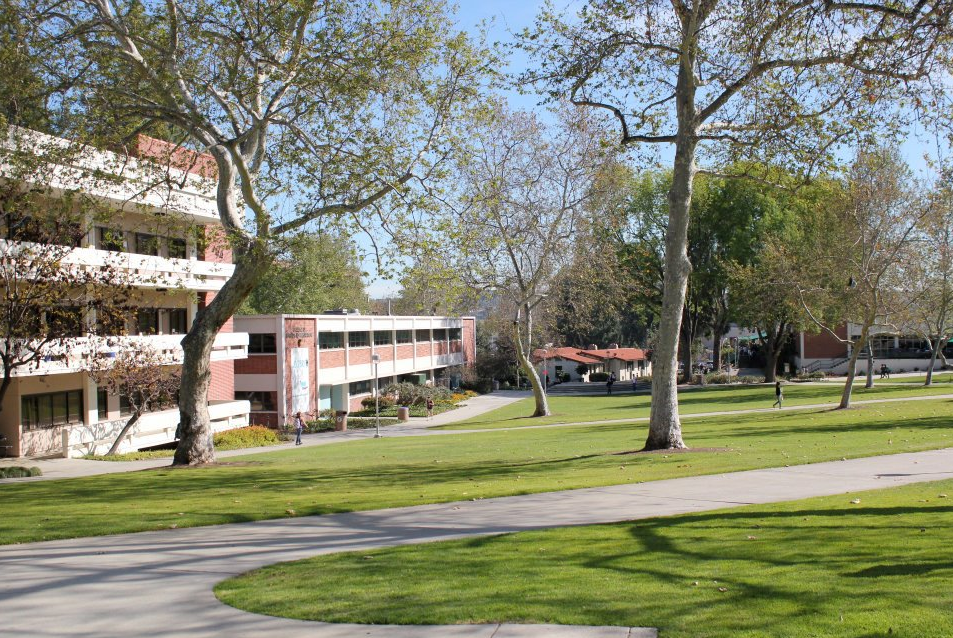
The main quad at Cal Poly Pomona

The university has actively sought to reduce carbon emissions and energy usage on campus. In November 2007, Cal Poly Pomona became a signatory member of the American College & University Presidents Climate Commitment. Among other things, this committed the university to ensure that within one year, it would purchase or produce at least 15% of the institution's electric consumption from renewable sources. The university, along with other members in the CSU, is also a member of the California Climate Action Registry. and lists on The Princeton Review's Guide to 375 Green Colleges. As a part of the campus' Climate Action Plan to reduce its carbon footprint, the campus offers incentive parking for students and faculty participating in its Rideshare program. The carpooling initiative gives users the opportunity to park in reserved spaces located closer to campus buildings.

Cal Poly Pomona's institute for sustainability education is the Lyle Center for Regenerative Studies. The center was built adjacent to an old landfill and conducts research in the areas of sustainable technology and agriculture. As an example of Cradle to Cradle Design, it uses solar-powered dormitories, aquaculture ponds, and organic gardens while providing environmentally sustainable housing accommodation for 22 graduate students. In 2010, with the installation of a 210,000 kW hours CPV system by Amonix, the center became the first carbon neutral facility in the California State University system. The center is part of Agriscapes, a 40-acre (16 ha) research project that showcases environmental and agricultural sustainable practices including methods to grow food, conserve water and energy and recycle urban waste. Agriscapes is home of the Farm Store at Kellogg Ranch which sells locally and campus-grown foods and products. Cal Poly Pomona campus also contains a rainforest greenhouse, a California ethnobotany garden, and an aquatic biology center collectively known as BioTrek, which provides environmental education to all academic levels.

The entire campus community is served by a free campus shuttle system known as "Bronco Express" run by the office of Transportation Services. In addition, PTS also offers a shuttle service known as "Metrolink" which provides both students and faculty a direct connection from the Pomona North and Downtown Pomona Metrolink stations to the CLA Building. Foothill Transit operates local bus service, a weekday shuttle to the San Dimas A Line station, and diverts weekday buses on the Silver Streak bus rapid transit to campus. A mobility hub is currently being designed to be constructed on the southeastern corner of the campus.

=== Seismic risks and other challenges of campus development ===
Although it is believed that the San Jose Fault (indicated by USGS as having a presumed period of 130,000 years) runs through campus, and geotechnical investigations have been conducted, there is uncertainty regarding its precise type and location. The CLA Building has been said to suffer from "structural flaws" that do not seem to have been clearly publicized, except that they had been "most notably, water intrusion", which continues to be portrayed inaccurately as a "structural flaw". In 2005, the university filed a lawsuit against a contractor, for which it was compensated $13.3 million in an out-of-court settlement. Amid these concerns, in September 2010, CSU's board of trustees approved a proposal to have the building razed.

Hideo Sasaki's architectural firm, Sasaki Associates, Inc., found in the February 2010 master plan that the campus's seismic risk, uneven terrain, lack of parking spaces, small classrooms, and pedestrian-unfriendly roads are major constraints for future campus development. It also indicated the lack of identity, an undefined sense of arrival, and a desire to build a stronger on-campus community, among others, as recurrent themes among campus's users. Nonetheless, the firm highlights campus ethnic diversity, its location-climate, and the natural beauty of campus, among others, as positive aspects of the physical campus as well as the campus life experience. It may be appropriate for the CSU

== Organization and administration ==
College founding
College	Year founded
Agriculture	1938
Business Administration	1968
Education and Integrative Studies	1973
Engineering	1957
Environmental Design	1970
Hospitality Management (Collins)	1973
Letters, Arts, and Social Sciences
Science

Cal Poly at Pomona is one of three polytechnics in the 23-member California State University system. The CSU system is governed by a 25-member board of trustees, including one faculty trustee, one alumni trustee, and two student trustees, and has authority over curricular development, campus planning, and fiscal management. The university system is currently governed by Chancellor Mildred García, who assumed the office in 2023.

The chief executive of the Cal Poly Pomona campus is President Vanya Quiñones, the former president of CSU Monterey Bay.

Cal Poly Pomona is a member of the American Association of State Colleges and Universities (AASCU)

=== University Educational Trust (UET) ===
The University Educational Trust (UET) was a 501(c)(3) tax-exempt organization serving as a source of external fund-raising, funds-management and revenue-distribution at Cal Poly Pomona. According to meeting minutes from 2011, the "Cal Poly Pomona University Educational Trust (UET) Board of Directors, the Chancellor's Office and University Administration made the decision to dissolve the UET and transfer all of its net assets to the Cal Poly Pomona Foundation, Inc."

=== Endowment ===
Cal Poly Pomona financial endowment was valued at $186.7 million as of the 2023–24 fiscal year. In fall 2010, Cal Poly Pomona embarked on its first comprehensive fundraising campaign. Early major donors helped raise more than half of the campaign's goal of $150 million before its formal launch. They included an anonymous benefactor who pledged $12 million, and $2 million from 1980 alumni Mickey and Lee Segal. Just before the campaign launch, on July 26, 2010, the W. K. Kellogg Foundation awarded a $42 million challenge grant to the university to increase educational access to underrepresented communities, making it the largest cash gift in the history of the CSU system. On February 28, 2011, Panda Express founders Andrew and Peggy Cherng announced a $2.5 million pledge to Cal Poly Pomona's Collins College of Hospitality Management. The university expects that its permanent endowment at the conclusion of its first comprehensive campaign will top $100 million. On June 15, 2021, philanthropist MacKenzie Scott made a $40 million cash gift to Cal Poly Pomona, making it the largest donation or grant to Cal Poly Pomona given by an individual.

== Academics ==
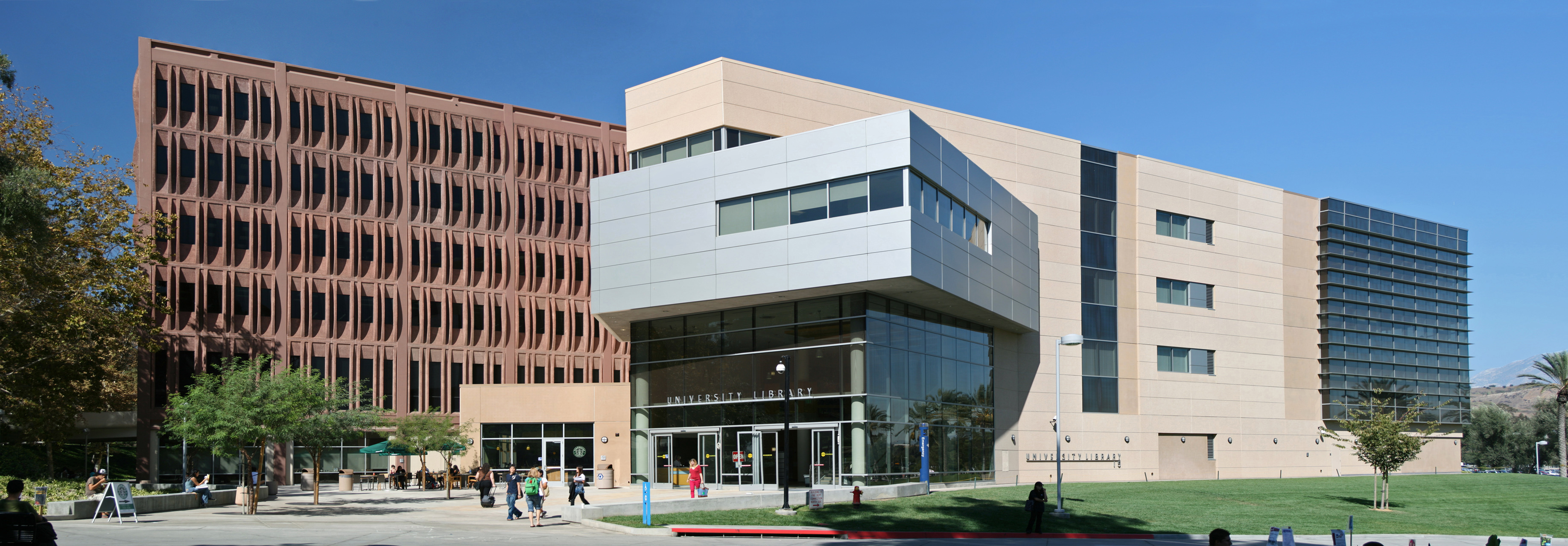
Main entrance of the Cal Poly Pomona University Library

Cal Poly Pomona's academic offerings have evolved throughout the years. Prior to the ownership shift to Cal Poly SLO in 1938, the Voorhis School for Boys in San Dimas had been providing educational offerings in "music, bookkeeping, agriculture, library work, carpentry, nature study, machine shop, and printing" coupled with Christian religious fundamentals to an all-male student body with poor, underage boys. In 1938, the campus became the agricultural branch of Cal Poly SLO when a small staff was transfer from San Luis Obispo along with group of agricultural inspection students. Thus, Cal Poly at Pomona (then just Cal Poly) began offering Associate's degrees in 1938 and Bachelor's degrees in 1940 when, despite legislative opposition from pro-University of California members in Sacramento, president Julian McPhee asked allied members Armistead B. Carter and Daniel C. Murphy to introduce the bill when two opposing members were not present to vote. Following the governance breakup with the San Luis Obispo in 1966, and as outlined by the 1960 California Master Plan for Higher Education, Cal Poly Pomona continued "offer[ing] undergraduate and graduate instruction through the master's degree in the liberal arts and sciences and professional education, including teacher education." Currently, Cal Poly Pomona promotes a "learn by doing" philosophy, where an essential part of the curriculum is hands-on application of knowledge.

Merriam-Webster mentions that "polytechnic", a word first known to have been used in 1798, is derived from the French polytechnique which contains the Greek-roots "poly" (English: many) and "technē" (art). Thus, Merriam-Webster defines "polytechnic" as, "relating to or devoted to instruction in many technical arts or applied sciences". Cal Poly Pomona's polytechnic approach, and learn-by-doing philosophy, encourages students in all programs to get real-world experience and skills necessary to join the workforce upon graduation.

In addition, the university is among six other institutions of higher education in California that have been designated a "Center of Academic Excellence" by the Department of Homeland Security and the National Security Agency (NSA). While all majors are encouraged to participate in co-op opportunities and internships, all students must do a senior research project.

The 300,000 sq ft (28,000 m^{2}) Cal Poly Pomona University Library serves "as the central intellectual and cultural resource of the campus community" and contains 2.4 million items and serves as an important center for academic research. Built in 1969 for $4.2 million, the library underwent a major renovation and expansion completed in the summer of 2008 at a cost of over $46 million. The library participates in the Online Computer Library Center (OCLC) Enhance program which allows it to correct or add information to bibliographic records in WorldCat.

=== Distinctions ===
With approximately 5,000 students, its college of Engineering is the second largest in the California State University system. The university has the largest Mechanical Engineering, Electrical Engineering, Civil Engineering, and Construction Engineering programs in the CSU, and is the only campus to offer an Engineering Technology focus.

Just behind Cal State Fullerton, the university has the second largest Business Administration major in the CSU with nearly 5,000 students. Its Hospitality program is the largest in the CSU and one of the largest in all of the US, with approximately 1,000 students enrolled. Overall, the university holds the fourth largest business college in the CSU.

=== Rankings ===
Academic rankings

Master's
- Washington Monthly: 41

Regional
- U.S. News & World Report: 3

National
- Forbes: 144
- WSJ/College Pulse: 22

According to U.S. News & World Report's 2025 "Best Regional Universities West Rankings," Cal Poly Pomona is ranked 3rd in the western United States for regional public schools whose highest degree is a Master's, 2nd in Top Public Schools, 2nd in Best Colleges for Veterans, 9 in Top Performers on Social Mobility (tie) and 27 in Best Value School. The same report ranked the College of Engineering for 10th (tie) out of undergraduate engineering schools in the U.S. where doctorates are not offered, with national program rankings of:

- Computer Engineering: 3nd
- Aerospace Engineering: 4th
- Civil Engineering: 4th
- Electrical Engineering: 4th
- Mechanical Engineering: 8th

2025 USNWR Graduate School Rankings
Program	Ranking
Public Affairs Programs	179

Top 10 foreign countries in headcount (Fall 2025)
Country	Headcount
Vietnam	59
India	50
China	45
South Korea	30
Myanmar	25
Taiwan	23
Germany	16
Japan	15
Indonesia	12
Saudi Arabia	10

Money Magazine ranked Cal Poly Pomona 15th in the country out of more than 700 schools it evaluated for its 2020 Best Colleges ranking. The Daily Beast ranked Cal Poly Pomona 159th in the country out of the nearly 2000 schools it evaluated for its 2014 Best Colleges ranking.

In Forbes magazine's 2019 list of "America's Best Colleges", Cal Poly Pomona was ranked number 273 among the 650 best public and private colleges and universities in the nation. In the 2012 "PayScale College Salary Report" conducted by PayScale of bachelor's graduates without higher degrees, Cal Poly Pomona ranked 19th among public universities in the country with a starting median salary of $46,800 and a mid-career median salary of $93,000. This places Cal Poly Pomona the fourth highest in California and the second highest in the CSU, while besting every UC with the exception of Berkeley and San Diego.

In December 2014 Kiplinger ranked Cal Poly Pomona 94th out of the top 100 best-value public schools in the nation, and 11th in California. Furthermore, Cal Poly Pomona is considered one of the top investments for educational value, with a 2013 net 30-year return on investment (ROI) of $917,100 according to PayScale. This ROI is the third highest in the CSU and 113th highest of the 1,511 US colleges and universities that were ranked, besting most UC campuses.

=== Admissions ===
Undergraduate admission statistics
	Fall 2025	Fall 2024	Fall 2023	Fall 2022	Fall 2021
First-time Freshmen
Applicants	48,255	51,024	46,242	49,721	41,226
Admits	35,630	37,545	33,737	27,179	24,993
Admit rate	74%	74%	73%	55%	61%
Enrolled	4,004	4,679	4,311	3,655	3,463
Yield rate	11%	12%	13%	13%	14%
Transfers
Applicants	12,675	12,934	12,179	14,639	16,618
Admits	8,902	10,053	9,627	7,801	7,641
Admit rate	70%	78%	79%	53%	46%
Enrolled	2,448	2,755	2,764	2,960	3,274
Yield rate	27%	27%	29%	38%	43%

The Carnegie Foundation for the Advancement of Teaching and U.S. News & World Report describe Cal Poly Pomona's admissions process as "selective". The CSU system lists Cal Poly Pomona among 16 of its institutions with higher admission standards for first-time freshmen. For the Fall of 2016 there were 32,917 first-time, first year applicants: 19,474 were admitted (51.9%) and 4,204 enrolled (an admissions yield of 21.6%). The middle 50% range of SAT scores was 440–560 for reading and 460–600 for math, while the middle 50% ACT Composite range was 20–27. Of the enrolled freshmen, 25.6% had a high school GPA of 3.75 or higher, while the average GPA was 3.45.

Freshmen applicants who graduate high school outside Cal Poly Pomona's Tier 1 area (known as Tier 2 applicants) are rank ordered by eligibility index and granted admission based on a year-specific cutoff score. Since academic year 2010–2011, Tier 1 applicants may no longer be guaranteed admissions based on the CSU Eligibility Index and may be subject to similar criteria as Tier 2 applicants.

==== Demographics ====
Undergraduate demographics as of Fall 2024
Race and ethnicity	Total
Hispanic	54%
Asian	21%
White	13%
Two or more races	4%
Unknown	3%
Black	2%
Foreign national	2%
Economic diversity
Low-income (Note: The percentage of students who received an income-based federal Pell grant intended for low-income students.)	46%
Affluent (Note: The percentage of students who are a part of the American middle class at the bare minimum.)	54%

Cal Poly Pomona is an ethnically and culturally diverse university, self-described as "Champions of Diversity", College Prowler states that "Cal Poly is the melting pot of the Cal States". As of 2018 Cal Poly Pomona has the third largest enrollment percentage of Asian Americans in the Cal State System.

Cal Poly Pomona has over 1,000 visa-bearing international students.

==== Impaction ====
During the fall admissions filing period, the CSU designates academic programs where more applications are received than can be accommodated by the campus, and designates them as "impacted". At Cal Poly Pomona, impacted academic programs include: Animal Health Science, Animal Science, Aerospace Engineering, Chemical and Materials Engineering, Civil Engineering, Computer Engineering, Electrical Engineering, Mechanical Engineering, Architecture, Psychology, Sociology, Communication, Biology, Biotechnology, and undeclared programs. As such, applicants are rank ordered by eligibility index regardless of local admissions area and are accepted as space permits. Cal Poly Pomona students who wish to change majors to an impacted program must meet supplemental requirements required for that major. Requesting a change to an impacted major must be received by the end of the initial filing period for the term for which new majors are being accepted (i.e. By February 28, 2010, for summer 2011; November 30, 2010, for fall 2011; June 30, 2011, for winter 2012; or August 31, 2011, for spring 2012).

== Student life ==
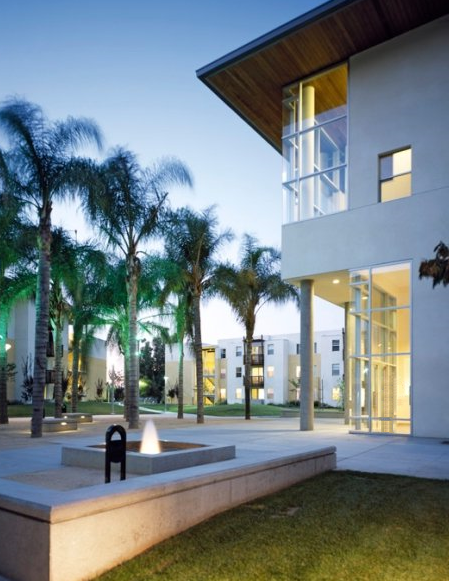
Student suites at Cal Poly Pomona

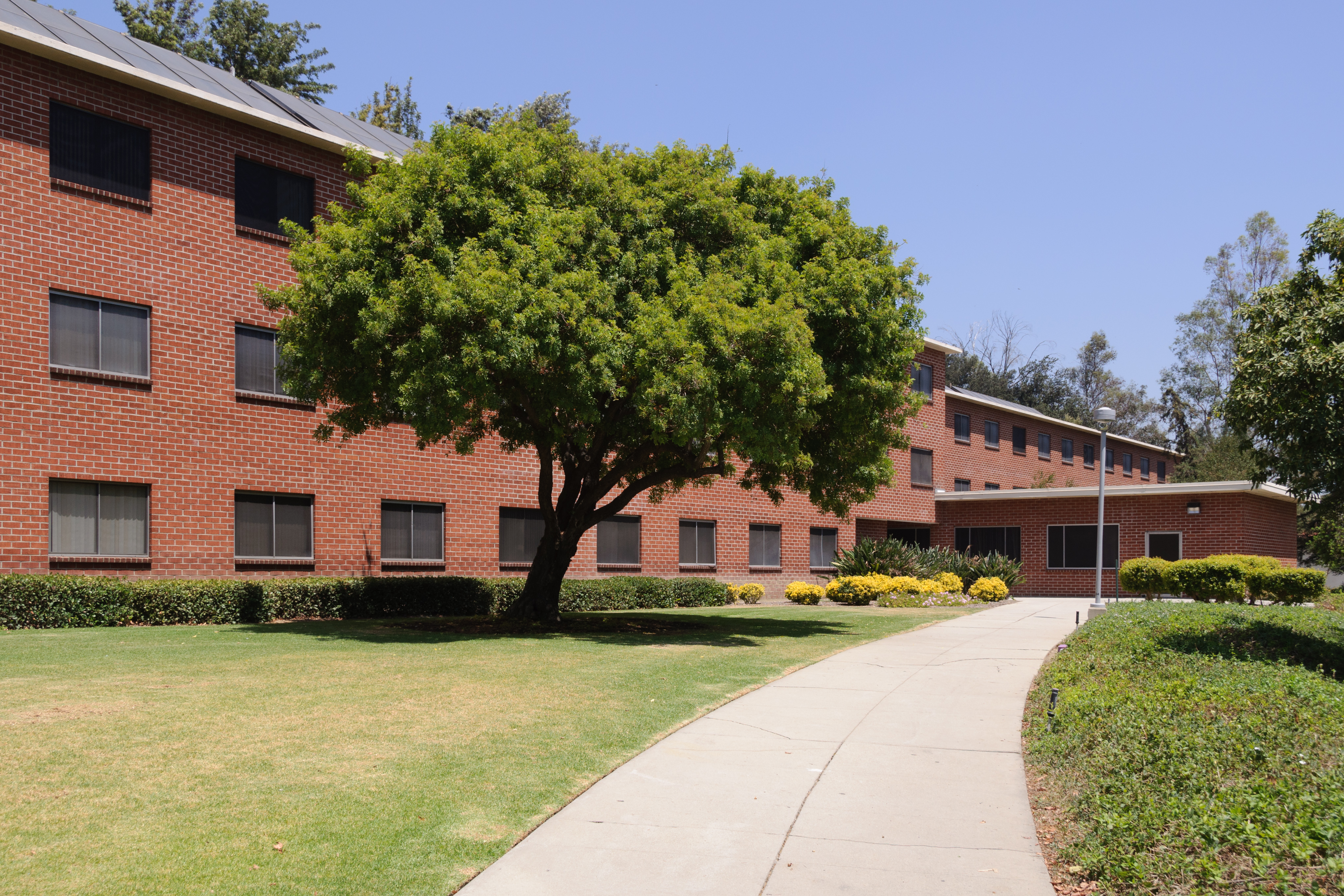
Aliso Residence Hall

=== Housing ===
Cal Poly's Bronco Recreation and Intramural Complex (BRIC)

With an on-campus housing capacity of 3,519 students, Cal Poly Pomona has the fifth largest housing system in the California State University. In 2016, 39% of first-year students and 10% of all students live in college housing.

There are three residential styles on the Pomona campus. The oldest housing facilities consist of six residential halls, known as the Traditional Halls, located on University Drive. The four older red-brick halls are named Alamitos, Aliso, Encinitas, and Montecito, each providing accommodation for up to 212 residents. The other two housing halls (Cedritos and Palmitas), were the result of a 1968 development and each has room to accommodate up to 185 residents. These two halls were described as eligible for the California Historic Register as "a significant example of the work of highly noted Southern California architectural firm, Smith and Williams".

Newer residential complexes include the University Village and the Suites which offer apartment-style living to non-freshman students. The Residence Halls, Traditional Halls, and the Suites are managed by the Division of Student Affairs, whereas the University Village is managed by the Cal Poly Pomona Foundation. Phase I of the construction of the Suites, housing 420 students, was completed in 2004 and Phase II, housing 622 students, opened in 2010.

In an effort to reduce commuting and raise academic performance and retention, starting with the 2010–2011 academic year, freshmen who did not graduate from a high school in the Tier 1 Local Admissions area (the area roughly bounded by the San Gabriel Mountains and Chino Hills to the north and south and the 15 and 605 freeways to the east and west), are required to live on campus.

Currently, there have been ongoing efforts to grow the residential community on campus. In 2017, construction began on two new residential halls (Sicomoro and Secoya) along with a new dining hall (Centerpointe Dining Commons), which are intended to replace the aging and seismically unfit residential community along University Drive. The new Residence Halls opened to select first-year residents in January 2020. The Residence Halls can house 980 residents and are only open to first-year students.

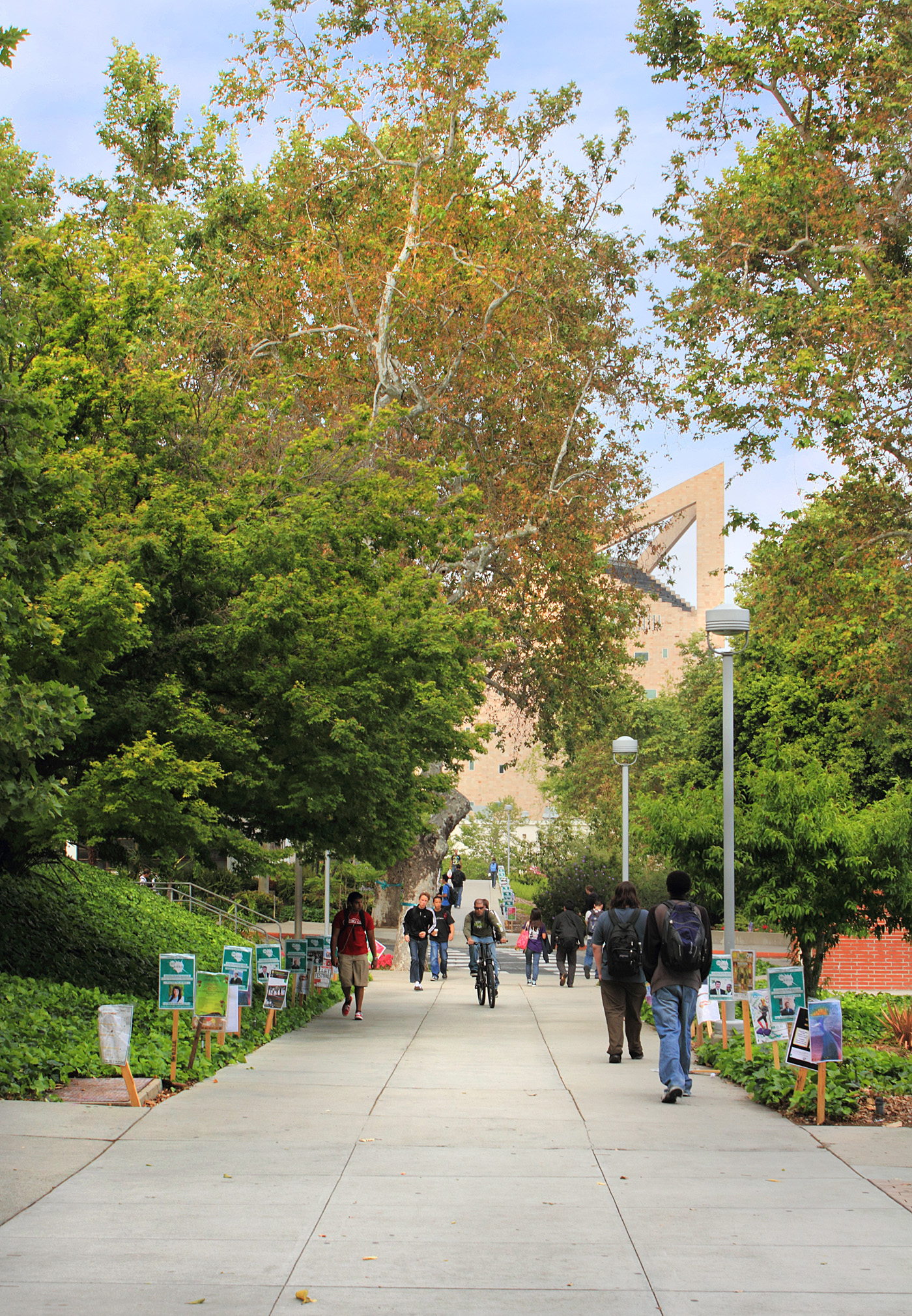
Students on a walkway leading to the CLA Building

=== Bronco Student Center ===
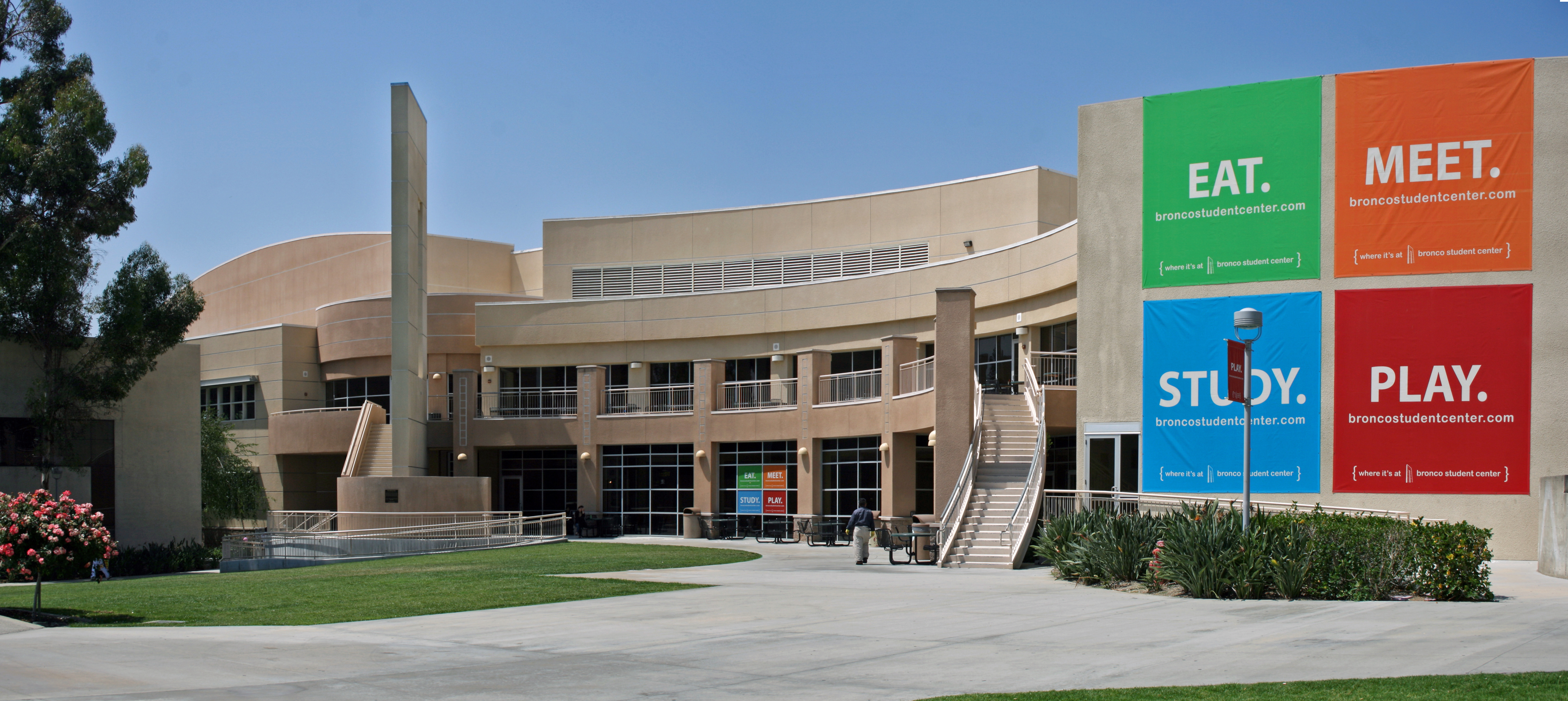
Bronco Student Center

The Bronco Student Center is a student activity center for meetings, conferences, meals, recreation, and shopping for students and alumni on the campus of Cal Poly Pomona in Pomona, California. This is where ASI student government offices are located, as well as other various student run departments like facilities and operations, Recreation, Programming and Marketing (RPM), Business Services, Games Room Etc. (GRE).

=== LGBT-friendly campus ===
According to The Advocate College Guide for LGBT Students, Cal Poly Pomona is one of the nation's best campuses for lesbian, gay, bisexual, and transgender students. The university offers gender-neutral housing, a pride center for LGBT students, the club oSTEM (out in STEM) and Pride Alliance for faculty and staff members.

=== Campus media ===
Campus events are covered by the student newspaper, the Poly Post. It was founded in 1940 as the Bronc's Cheer when the university was still in San Dimas. The name was changed to The Poly Views in 1942 and finally to The Poly Post in 1962.

The Bronco Sports Show is a quarterly television broadcast capturing the highlights and statistics from Bronco Athletics along with other featured events around the campus.

CPP News is the university's official online magazine. CPP News features news, announcements of campus events, spotlights on various departments, and resources for faculty and staff. A web site also provides a comprehensive archival search for past articles and photos.

=== Bronco Pep Band ===
The Bronco Pep Band is a student-run band at Cal Poly Pomona. The band is a group within the athletic department. It follows the tradition of other student-run bands in the sense that it focuses on its members' individuality. The band attends athletic events during the year to encourage the school's athletic teams and audience support/involvement. The pep band is entirely voluntary and all students at Cal Poly Pomona or anyone else in the area are free to join.

=== Greek life ===
Greek Life at Cal Poly Pomona consists of 16 fraternities and 11 sororities governed by the Greek Council. From the total male undergraduate population, 2% are enrolled in fraternities and 1% of women in sororities respectively. In 2005, Lambda Phi Epsilon pledge Kenny Luong died from injuries suffered during a brutal football game between members of the fraternity and those pledging to join it.

=== Rose Parade float ===
Cal Poly Pomona together with Cal Poly San Luis Obispo has participated in the Tournament of Roses parade since 1949; winning the Award of Merit in their first year. From 1949 to 2005, the floats have won 44 awards. This joint program is one of the longest consecutive running self-built entries in the parade, as well as the only "self built" floats designed and constructed entirely by students year-round on both campuses. The Rose Float tradition continues today and marks the partnership between the two Cal Poly campuses.

== Athletics ==
=== Voorhis Vikings ===
Before the university moved from San Dimas to Pomona, the college had a handful of athletic teams named the "Voorhis Vikings". They were composed mostly of homeless and orphaned boys of all races who were cared for at the Voorhis School during the ten-year period it operated. Despite this historical background, the university's current athletic programs are named the Broncos.

=== Cal Poly Pomona Broncos ===
Cal Poly Pomona varsity teams compete in the California Collegiate Athletic Association of NCAA Division II. Teams are known as the Cal Poly Pomona Broncos and field 11 sports for men and women across the fall, winter, and spring seasons. Cal Poly Pomona's most recent national championship came in 2024 Division II Women's Soccer when the Broncos defeated Minnesota State Mankato 2–1 in Matthews, North Carolina, earning the program's first title. The Broncos are currently the most successful department in the CCAA, having achieved 74 CCAA Titles and 15 National Titles. University athletes have also claimed 25 individual National Titles, coming in men's and women's track and field, men's and women's tennis, and women's gymnastics. Besides being located in close proximity to each other, Cal State LA and Cal Poly Pomona have competed heavily as conference rivals.

Team national championships for the Broncos include the following:

- Baseball (3): 1976, 1980, 1983
- Men's Cross Country (1): 1983
- Men's Basketball (1): 2010
- Women's Basketball (5): 1982, 1985, 1986, 2001, 2002
- Women's Soccer (1): 2024
- Women's Tennis (4): 1980, 1981, 1991, 1992

== Notable people ==
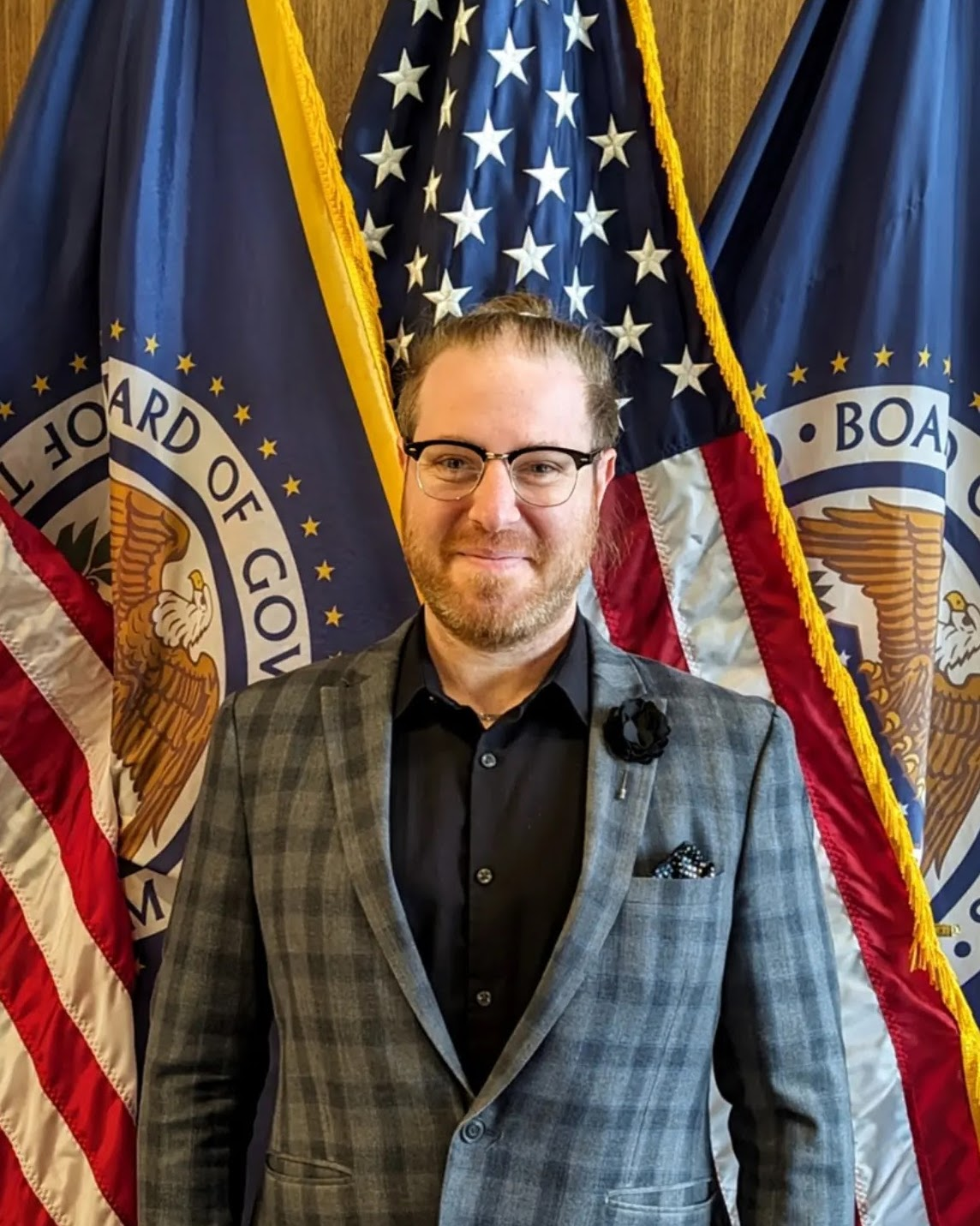
Albert Fattal

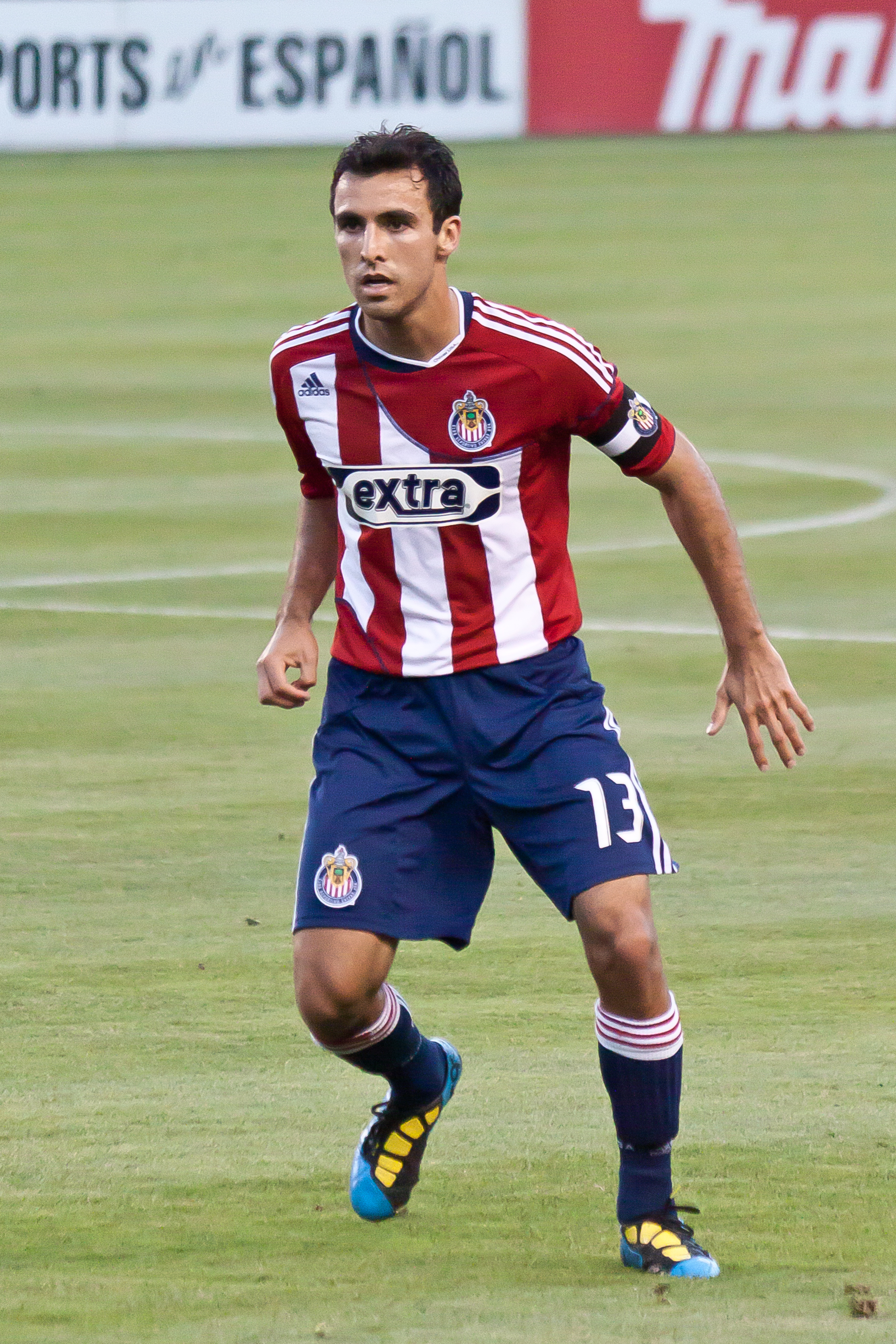
Jonathan Bornstein

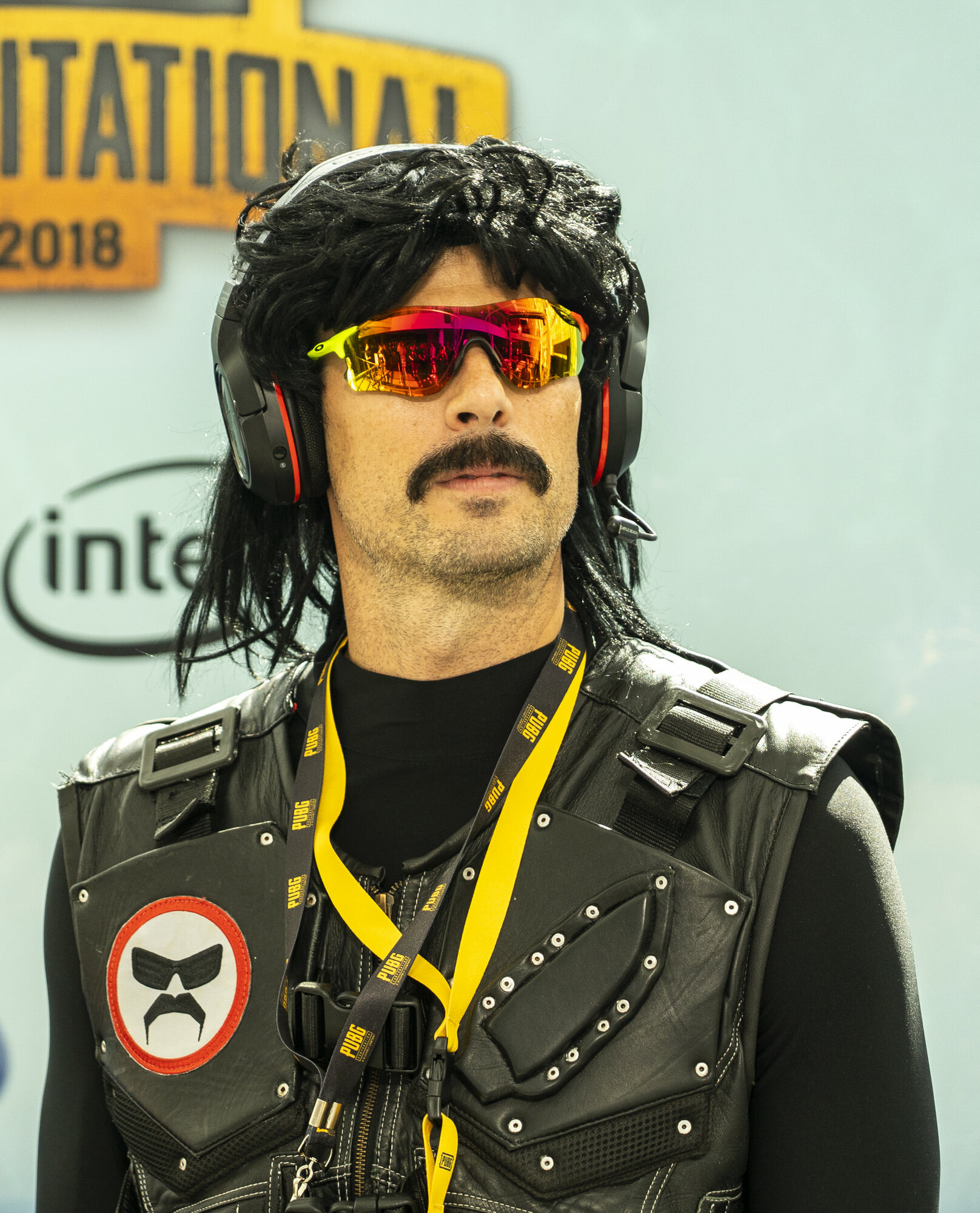
Dr Disrespect (Hershel Beahm IV)

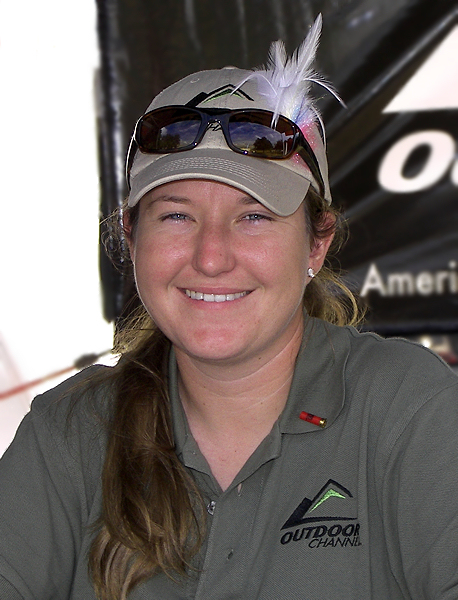
Kim Rhode

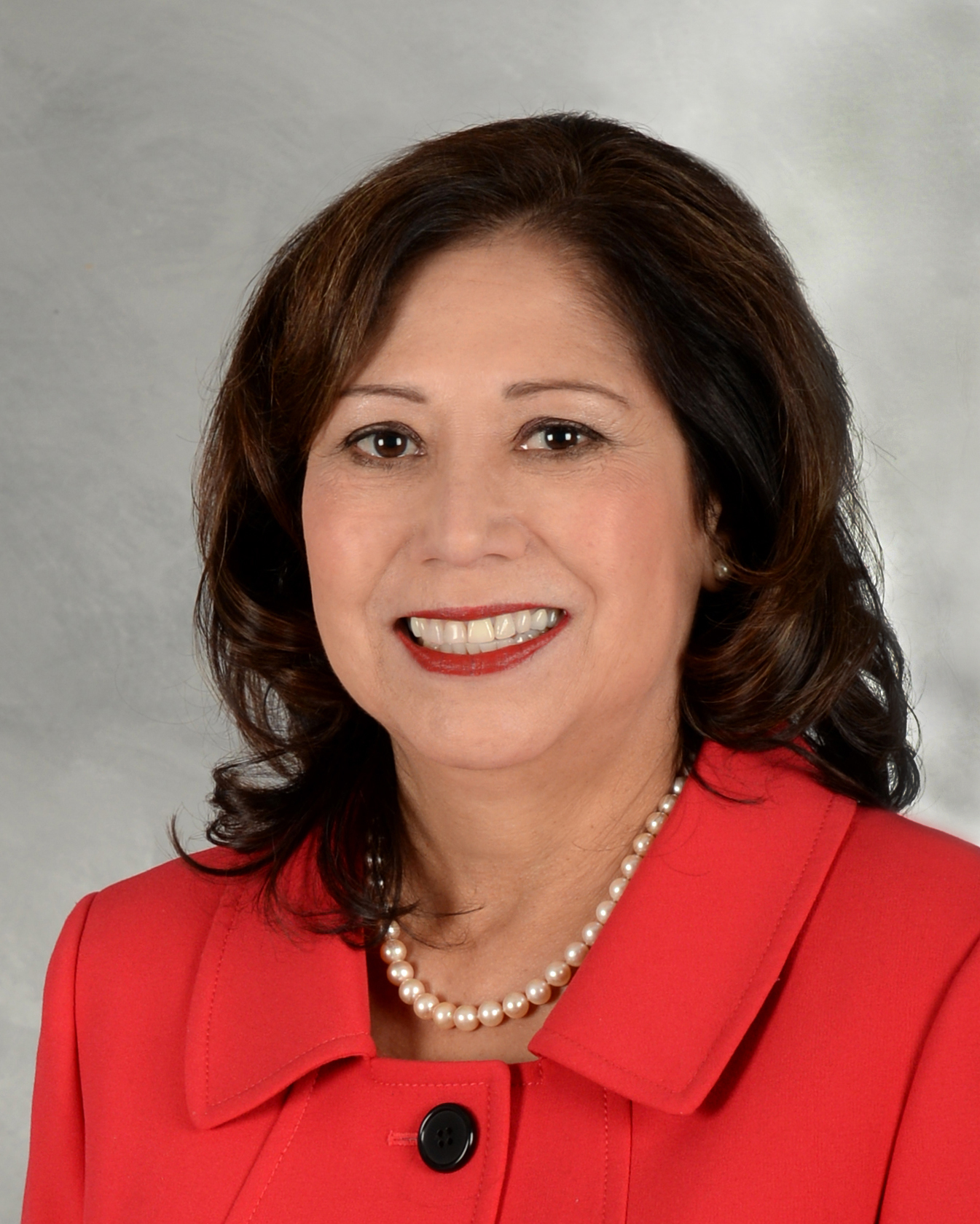
Hilda Solis

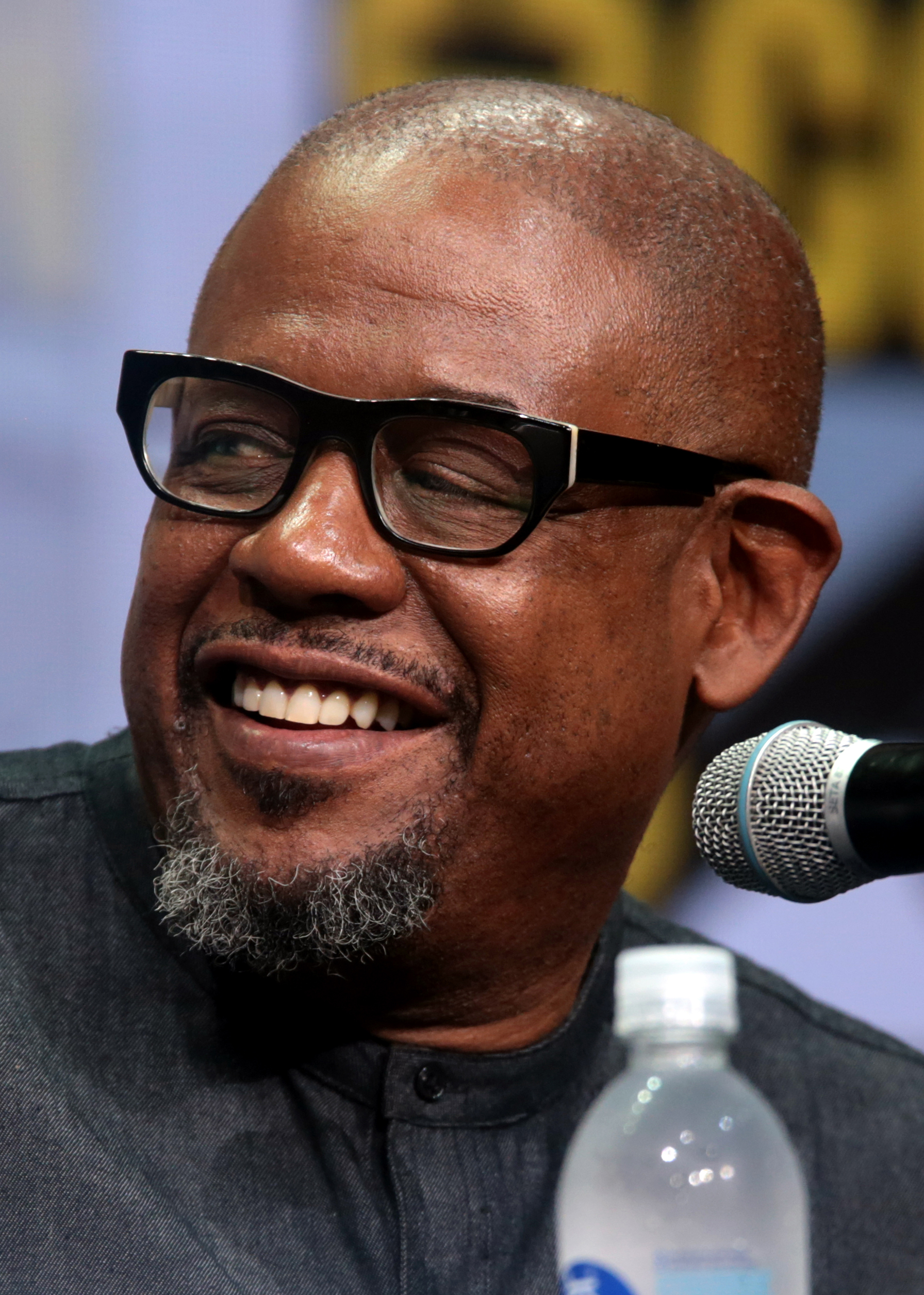
Forest Whitaker

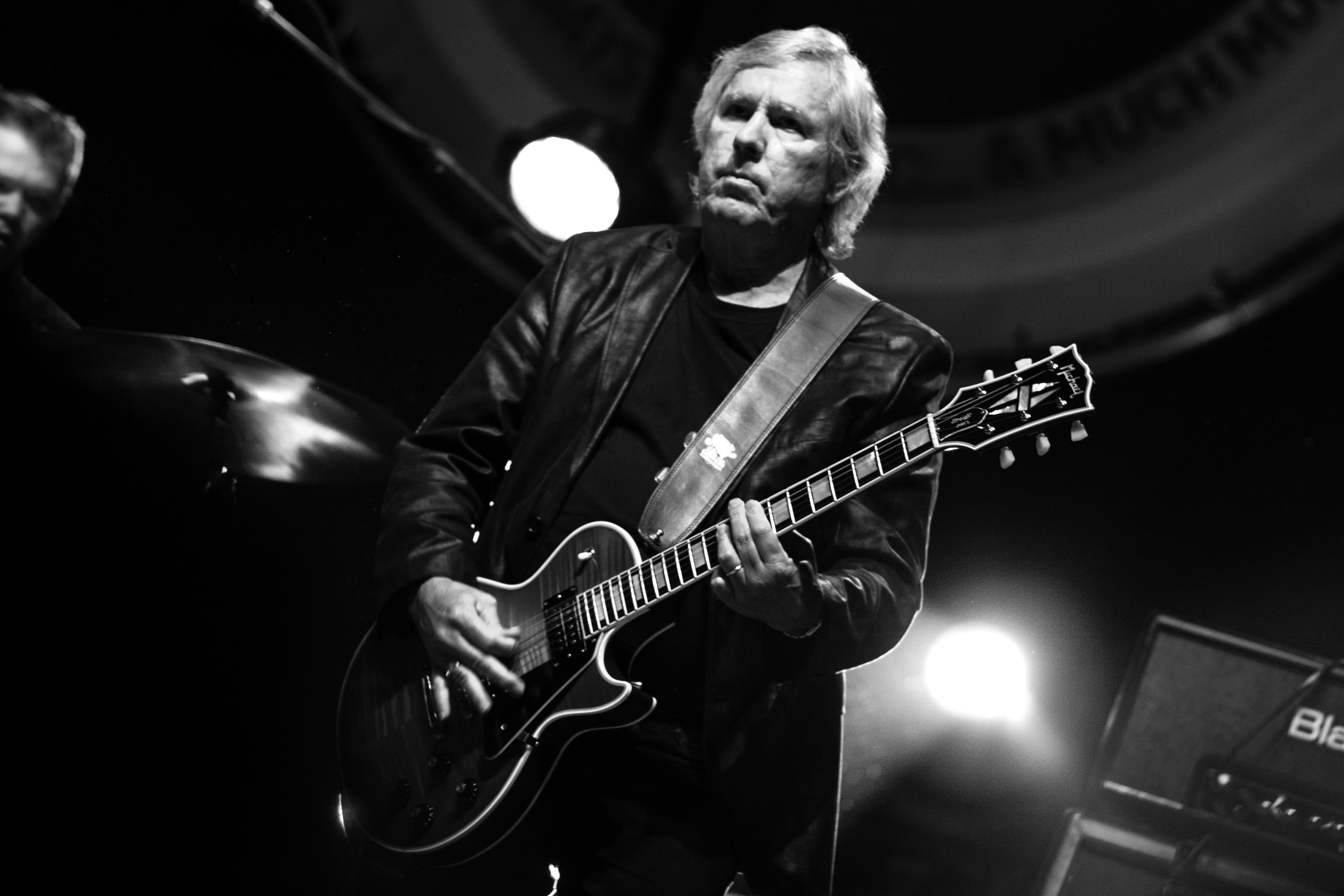
James Williamson

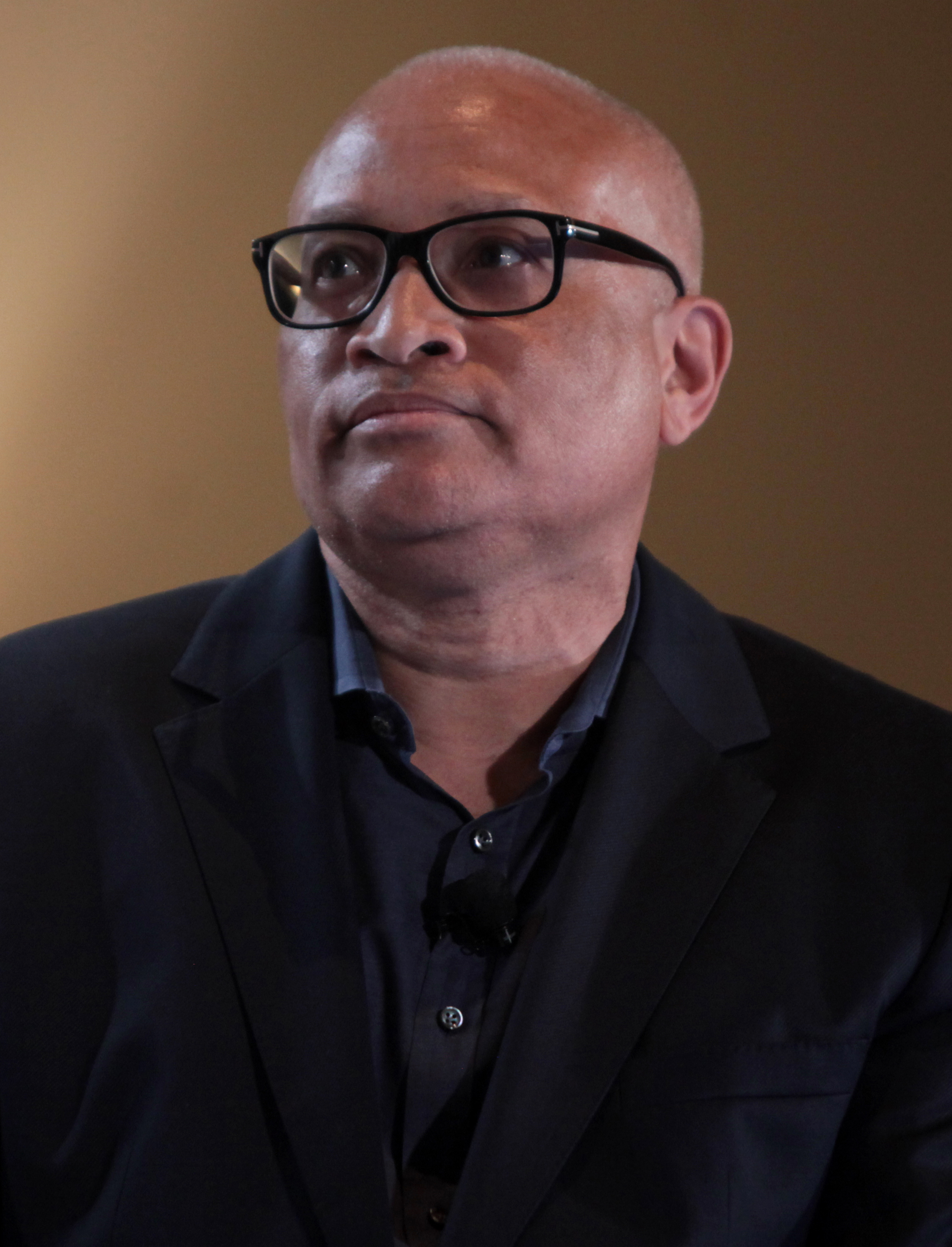
Larry Wilmore

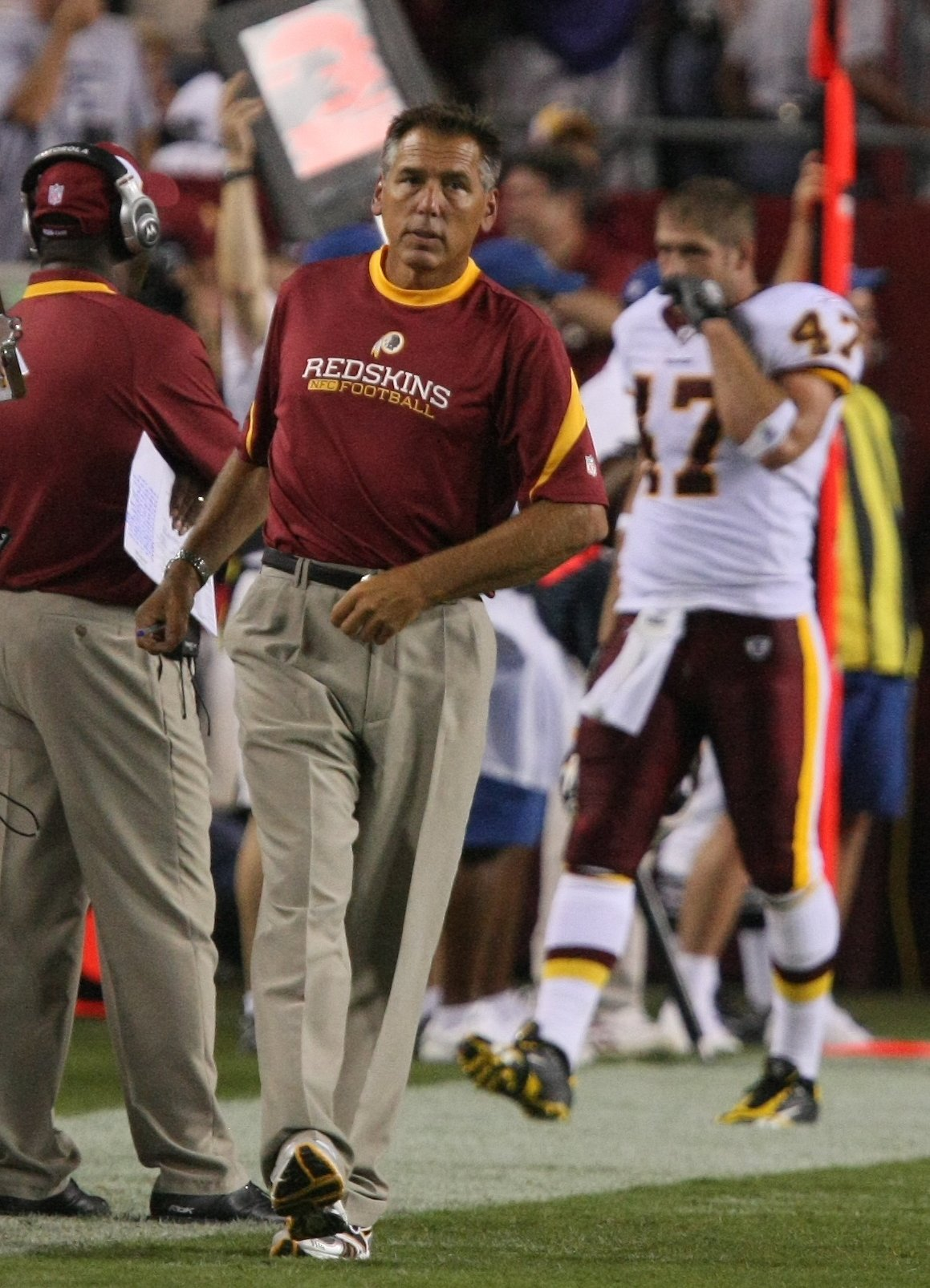
Jim Zorn

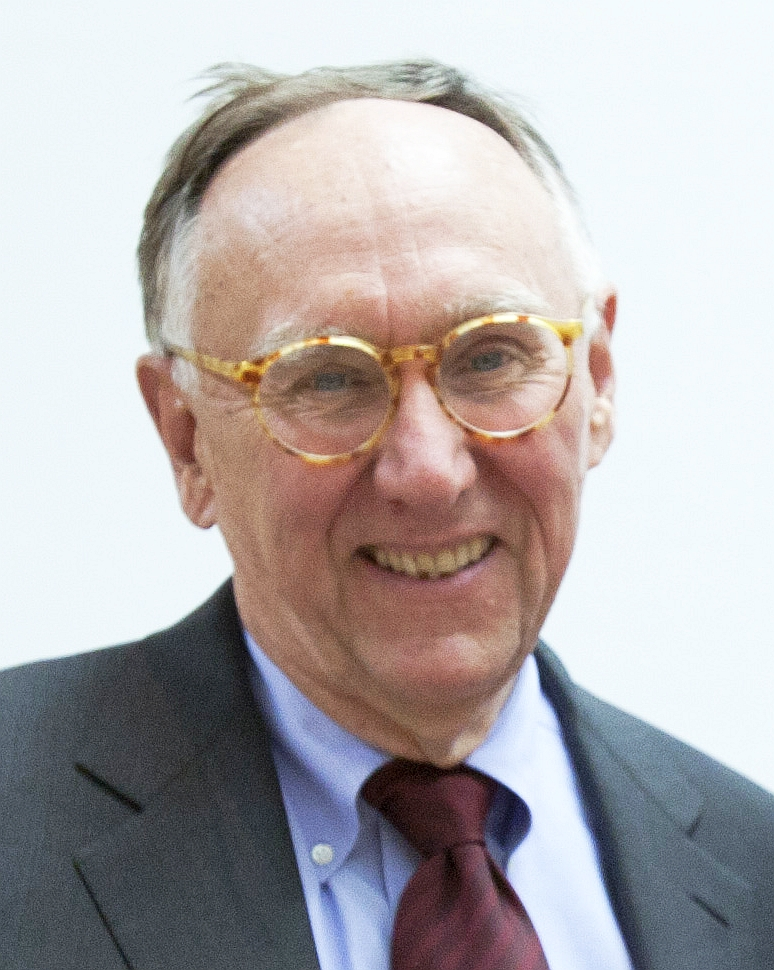
Jack Dangermond

== See also ==
- California Master Plan for Higher Education
