= Collins College =

Collins College may refer to:

- Collins College (Arizona), a for-profit college that moved from Tempe to Phoenix, Arizona prior to closing in 2016
- The Collins College of Hospitality Management, a hospitality management college in the city of Pomona, California and one of the eight colleges forming part of Cal Poly Pomona

== See also ==
- Collin College, a community college district in the Dallas–Fort Worth–Arlington metropolitan area in Texas
