= International Polytechnic High School =

Coordinates: 34.0510°N 117.8195°W

Location
- 3851 West Temple Avenue, Pomona, CA 91768; Pomona, California, United States

Information
- Type: Public secondary
- Motto: "It takes a village to raise a child" - African proverb
- Established: 1993
- School district: Los Angeles County Office of Education
- Principal: Ginger Merritt-Paul
- Grades: 9-12
- Enrollment: max. 500
- Campus: on the campus of Cal Poly Pomona
- Colors: Green and Gold
- Nickname: iPoly
- Website: www.ipolyhighschool.org

International Polytechnic High School, commonly referred to as IPoly, is a public college-preparatory demonstration high school (9-12) found in the California State Polytechnic University, Pomona (Cal Poly Pomona) campus and operated by the Los Angeles County Office of Education (LACOE) in collaboration with the College of Education and Integrative Studies at the university. iPoly's curriculum is fully accredited by the Western Association of Schools and Colleges and is approved by the University of California and California State University. It runs hand-in-hand with the Los Angeles County High School for the Arts (LACHSA), which is also run by LACOE. Since iPoly is not a part of fixed school district, it draws students from all over Los Angeles, San Bernardino, Orange and Riverside counties. Most of the students come from the Pomona and San Gabriel valleys. In 2009, 2013, and 2019, iPoly was honored as a California Distinguished School by the California Department of Education.

== History ==
Early in 1991, Cal Poly Pomona made a decision to accept the invitation of LACOE to enter into a collaborative relationship for the purpose of joining the K-12 education reform movement initiated by A Nation at Risk.

The goal of the partnership was to:

1. Create a model of curriculum reform by designing and putting into use an entire high school course of study using an interdisciplinary and international curriculum approach.
2. Better prepare students to enter either higher education or the world of work. The planning team was made up of forty-seven professionals representing LACOE, Cal Poly Pomona, and the local business community.

The original concept was stated in the following manner: "The model is project-based and experiential in nature. It is essentially student-centered and driven, and incorporates new technologies, as well as a new understanding of the kind of journey students and educators will take through a dynamic, global, 21st century landscape. The basic components consists of progressive educational principles, global perspectives and analysis, and interdisciplinary study."

The school first accepted students in 1993, with a class of twelve freshmen, and graduated its first class of approximately 20 students in 1997, with a full graduating class in 1998. Originally, the campus was located in portables adjacent to the buildings of the College of Arts on the Cal Poly campus. These portables were later moved to the edge of the Cal Poly campus in Parking Lot K. A new $20 million state-of-the art high school facility opened in the fall of 2012, at the cross street of University Drive and Temple Avenue on the campus of Cal Poly.

In its early years, iPoly was a member of the Coalition of Essential Schools, but its membership later lapsed. The original model divided the world into different projects concentrating on each project, but that was later dropped as transferring students' curriculum became too difficult. Originally, iPoly also participated in the California Interscholastic Federation with a basketball team, but that was later dropped and iPoly students have the opportunity to play high school athletics at their home schools teams. (There is currently only one student participating in this)

In addition, the original model was to have teachers from their home districts "rotate in" for a few years and then use the lessons learned from their teaching at their other schools. Due to the constant turnover, that was later de-emphasized and a smaller number of rotating teachers intermingle with teachers on long-term contract. Today, under the guidance of CEIS, iPoly is evolving into a teacher training and demonstration site. It is envisioned that iPoly will serve as a staff development hub for the surrounding school districts. However, it is neither a charter school nor a magnet school, nor does it have any formal relationship with the other districts.

== Curriculum ==
There is no one accepted definition of project-based learning. iPoly defines project-based learning as a teaching strategy that organizes learning around projects. Projects consist of complex tasks or components, based on answering essential questions or solving problems. These questions or problems drive the project and standard based class curriculum in order to encourage real world application. International Polytechnic places an emphasis on student development beginning with personal responsibility, self-management, effective communication, lifelong learning skills and effective use of technology.

Other unique aspects of the school include its use of narrative evaluation in addition to traditional grading (grading occurs on a modified E-S-N-U system, which is then mapped to the A-G system for college admissions purposes); integration with Cal Poly Pomona, including permitting students to take up to eight units of classes at Cal Poly; and an emphasis on service learning, including mandatory hours of community service. Students even have the opportunity to discuss grades in an open format to agree or appeal their overall grades if they feel they are incorrect.

=== Mentorship ===
Students at the senior level are expected to complete 60 hours of mentorship related to their senior projects. Seniors are expected to find their own mentor for their last project.

=== Culminating Events ===
Students participate in a culminating experience at the conclusion of each project. During this event, students display accomplishments and present understanding of knowledge and skills, using a variety of methods.

These events are in the form of formal presentations where students are required to wear professional clothing and use technology to enhance the presentation given. Students in most cases will complete this task as a group, with the exception of Senior Presentations, which are done alone. Students will receive assessments from their teachers, group, and peers; All of which is used to determine a student's final grade.

== Matriculation ==
Approximately 94% of iPoly graduates go on to pursue higher education; of them, more than 30% are the first in their families to do so. Given the school's location, many graduates choose to attend Cal Poly Pomona. In the past, admittance to Cal Poly was guaranteed upon graduation, but that is no longer the case and iPoly students are admitted using normal CSU standards. All iPoly courses meet California State University and University of California requirements.

== Recognition ==
iPoly was awarded the California School Boards Association's 2006 Golden Bell Award in the category of "Innovative High Schools".

iPoly is among the few public high schools in California to receive a distinguished GreatSchools rating of 10 out of 10.
