= CLA Building =

Former building complex in Pomona, California

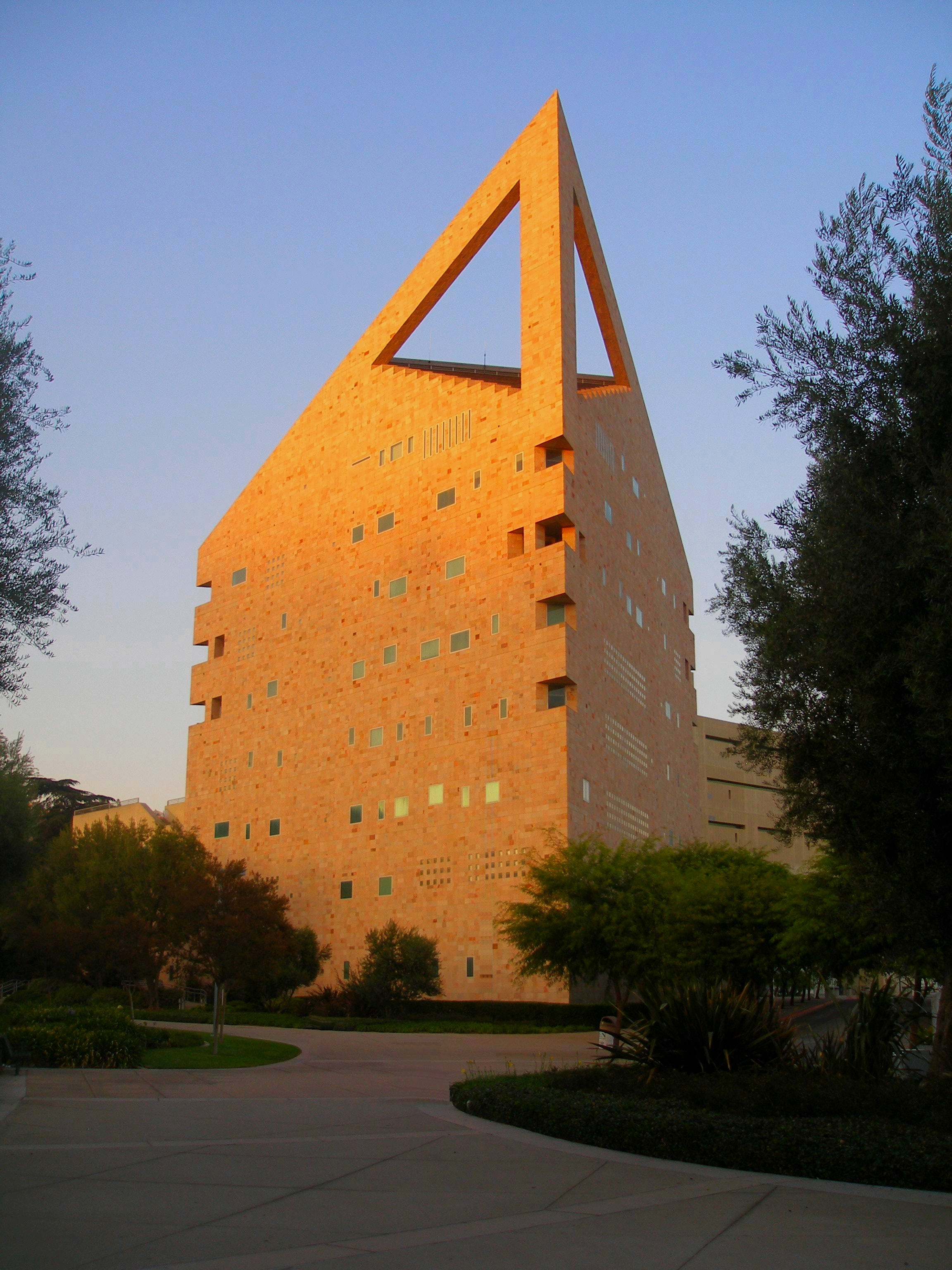
- The CLA Building in 2009

General information
- Architectural style: Futurist
- Location: Pomona, California, United States
- Coordinates: 34.059412°N 117.819979°W
- Completed: 1993
- Demolished: 2022
- Client: Cal Poly Pomona

Design and construction
- Architect: Antoine Predock

The Classroom, Laboratory & Administration Building, commonly known simply as the CLA Building, was an administrative building on the campus of California State Polytechnic University, Pomona (Cal Poly Pomona). Designed by Albuquerque, New Mexico–based architect Antoine Predock in the Futurist style and completed in 1993, it has come to be the defining image of the university. The Administration portion of the building was demolished in August 2022 after a discovery of a fault line under the building.

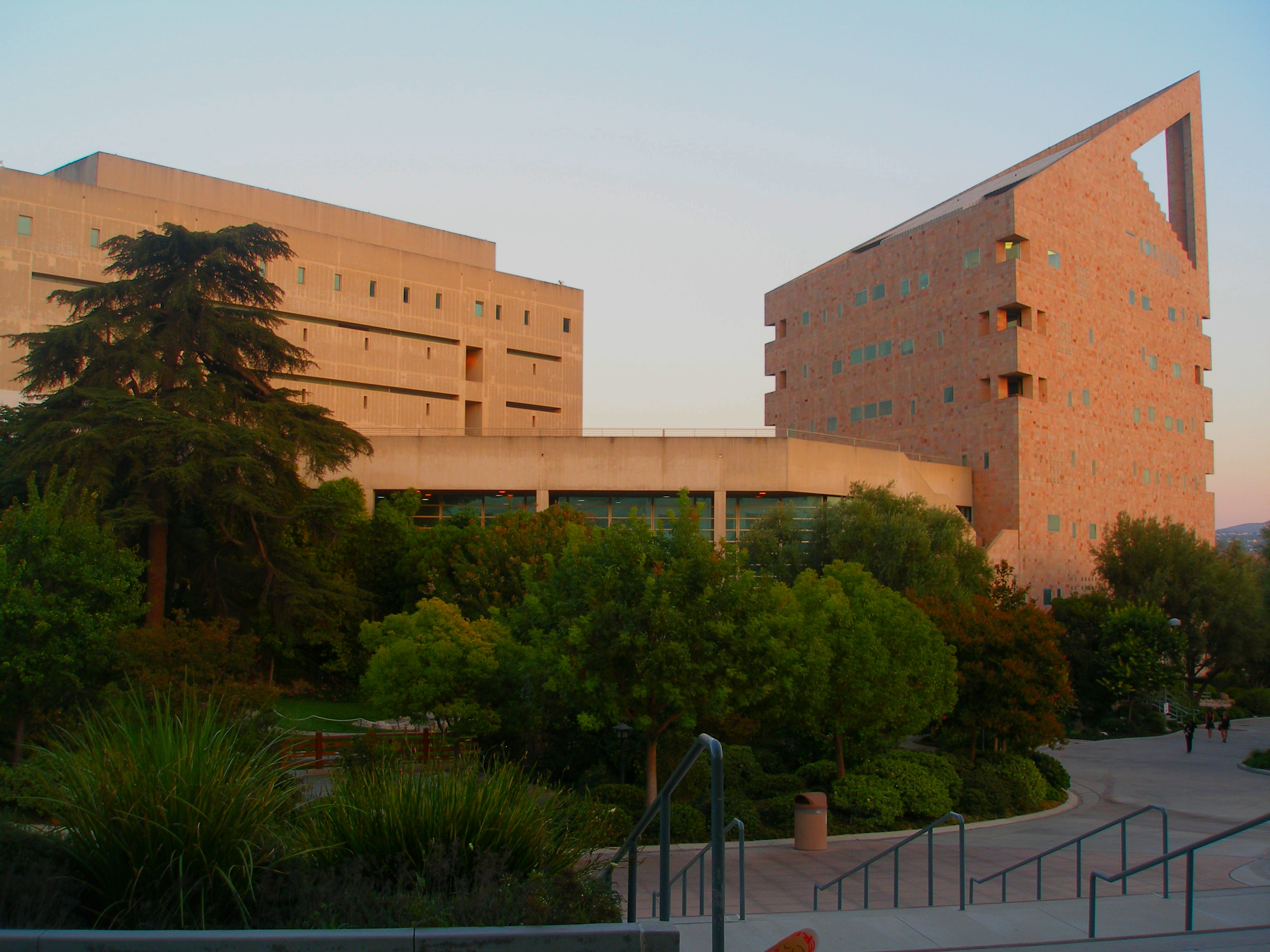
CLA building complex (Classroom and Laboratory to the left, Registrar in the center, Administration to the right)

Its pointed, triangular and open top made it the most distinct tower on the university campus. According to Predock, "inevitably, human settlement alters the landscape. Successive habitation has altered the Pomona Valley from the original dry swept earth of Rancho San Jose. Now the verdant Arabian horse ranch of W.K. Kellogg coexists with the technological, superscale freeway interchange." Due to Cal Poly Pomona's proximity to the Los Angeles district of Hollywood, the building has been displayed in films such as Gattaca and Impostor, as well as several TV commercials for products such as cars and cell phones. Cal Poly Pomona changed its logo in 1994 after the opening of the building.

The CLA building sat directly above the San Jose Hills fault and had the second-highest seismic "risk score" of 72.94, in the California State University system, after Warren Hall at CSU East Bay. It suffered no structural damage as a result of the 5.4 magnitude July 29, 2008 Chino Hills earthquake. It leaked water since it was completed in 1993, while the building's connections and beams did not meet California earthquake safety standards. The University won a $13.3 million settlement after a lawsuit against the contractor who built the CLA. University officials began contemplating demolishing the building due to the amount of maintenance work it required. The CSU Board of Trustees, at its September 21, 2010 meeting, approved a proposal to replace the CLA with a new facility.

All administrative offices located in the "tower" portion of the CLA were moved to the Student Services Building (SSB). The SSB (colloquially known as the "Spaceship" or the "Pringle") opened in spring 2019 and is located directly southeast from where the CLA once stood. The Cal Poly Pomona logo was also changed in 2018 concurrent with the disuse of the CLA tower.

The removal of the Administration portion of the building, including the Registrar area began in May 2022 and was completed by the end of summer.

The CLA was replaced by The Park at 98 which offers green space, outdoor seating, and studying areas. This new park opened in the spring of 2023, consisting of three levels of terraces that make up nearly 8,600 square feet of gathering space. As a tribute to the tower, a seating wall in the form of a point was constructed using sections from the demolished CLA tower. This wall encircles the approximate location where the CLA once stood. The Classroom and Laboratory portions of the building are to be renovated and placed back in service, which has been controversial among some students and faculty.
