= Manor House (Pomona, California) =

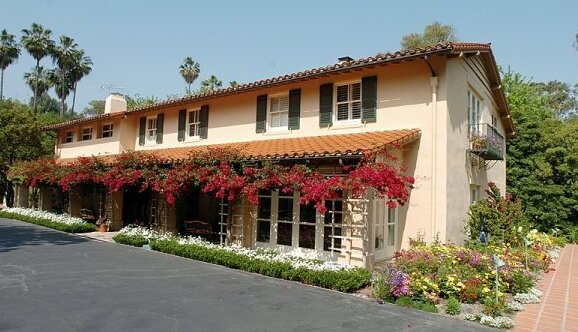
- Interactive map of the Manor House area

General information
- Architectural style: Spanish Colonial Revival
- Location: 3765 South University Dr; Pomona, California
- Coordinates: 34°03′37″N 117°49′23″W
- Current tenants: Dr. Vanya Quiñones, President of Cal Poly Pomona

Design and construction
- Architect: Myron Hunt

Manor House is the official residence of the President of California State Polytechnic University, Pomona, located in Pomona, California.

== History ==
Manor House was built in 1926, designed by famed Californian architect Myron Hunt, as a part of the larger Kellogg Ranch complex established by Will Keith Kellogg, founder of the Kellogg's cereal company. It was originally built for Kellogg's eldest son, Karl, who moved his family to California to manage his father's ranch.

Manor House, along with the rest of Kellogg Ranch, was donated in 1956 to what would become California State Polytechnic University, Pomona.

The house was renovated in 2004 for $167,000.
