= Cal Poly Pomona University Library =

University library system in California

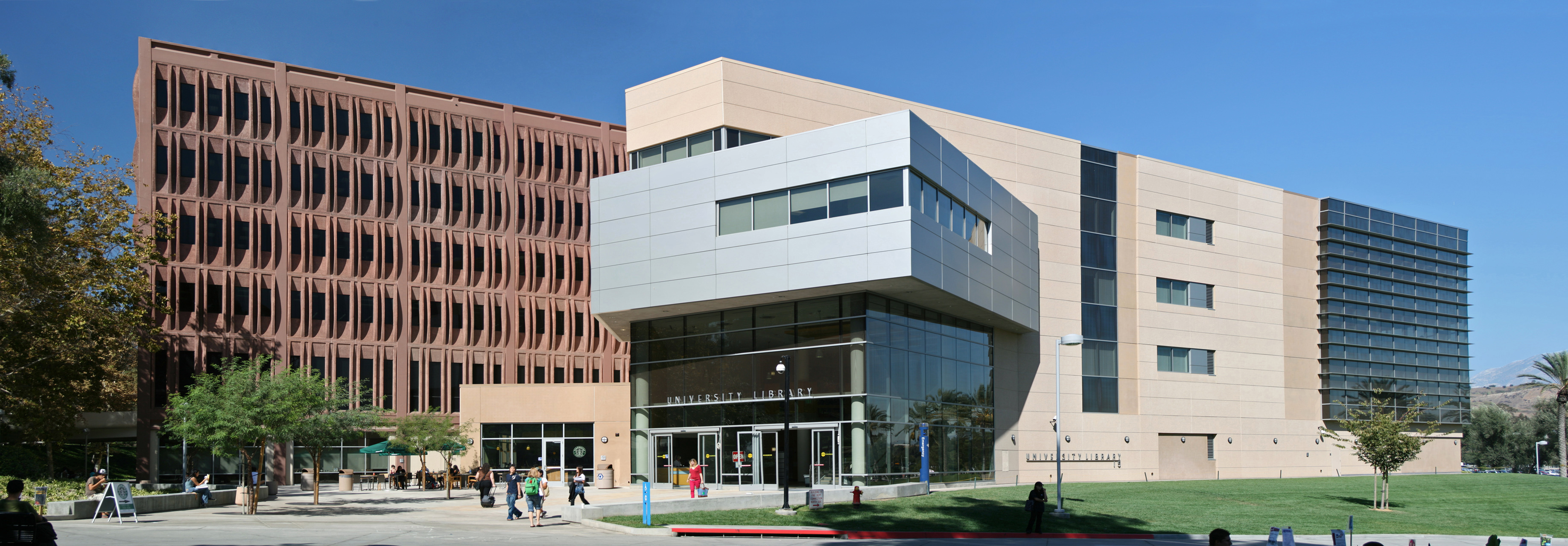
- University library façade
- 34°03′28.38″N 117°49′17.33″W
- Location: Pomona, California, United States
- Type: Academic library
- Scope: Research
- Established: 1938
- Branches: 0 (1 independent resource library]

Collection
- Size: 2.4 million items

Access and use
- Population served: 26,443 as of fall 2018
- Members: Cal Poly Pomona faculty, staff, students, in addition to the surrounding community, and CSU+ affiliated libraries' patrons

Other information
- Director: Patsy T. Hawthorne
- Website: www.cpp.edu/~library/

The Cal Poly Pomona University Library is an on-campus University Library serving students at Cal Poly Pomona. The University Library combines digital resources and state-of-the-art technology with traditional holdings. The library offers shared and private spaces for more than 10,000 students.

The library houses artwork by Roy Lichtenstein and Le Corbusier.

The library participates in the Online Computer Library Center (OCLC) Enhance program that allows the library to correct or add information to bibliographic records in WorldCat.

== History ==
In 1938, Cal Poly opened its doors to 80 students on September 15, 1938, on the former site of the Voorhis School for Boys in San Dimas. This rural setting provided one room (measuring 33 feet by 45 feet) to get designated as the Library, with seating for 48 students. It came complete with study tables, a fireplace, and a few hundred books remaining from the Voorhis School. They quickly supplemented the collection with materials necessary to support the agricultural orientation of the college.

Lavina Penley was the first librarian to serve Cal Poly, Voorhis Campus, followed by Ruth Hoff, and then by Harold F. Wells in 1954. The number of volumes in the Library increased from 3,700 in 1948 to over 6,500 in 1954.

In 1956, the Library collection continued to multiply with the University's enrollment. By 1956 Cal Poly outgrew the San Dimas facilities and moved to its current site in Pomona, formerly the W.K. Kellogg Arabian Horse Ranch.

The Administration building housed the new library in three rooms (now the Science building) and had seating for 80 students. Mr. Wells directed moving over 8,000 volumes from San Dimas to Pomona in the summer of 1956. That same year, to support an increasing student population and its expanded academic curriculum, the library changed the book call numbers from the Dewey Decimal system, commonly used by smaller libraries, to the Library of Congress classification, used by larger libraries.

In 1959, it was soon evident that the Library needed its own facility, and in 1959 the first Cal Poly Pomona Campus Library building opened. Mr. Wells again directed the transfer of the collection, then numbering 16,584 volumes. Within five years, the volume count reached 63,138, and three years later, once again outgrowing the existing facility, the Library completed plans for a new building.

By the winter of 1968, the new $4.2 million Cal Poly Pomona Library building was ready for occupancy. The campus designed a four-story structure (with floors numbered ground through 3rd) to allow for the later addition of two stories to accommodate future growth. More than 1,000 students, faculty, and Library staff combined efforts to move over 150,000 books, furnishings, and equipment.

Harold F. Wells served 29 years as Library Director. Upon Mr. Wells's retirement, the University appointed Harold B. Schleifer as Acting Director in 1983, Director in 1985, and became the first library Dean until his retirement in December 2008. Harold Schliefer campaigned heavily to create a Dean-level position to reflect the prominence of the library on campus. He also wanted to bring the job in line with the other California State University academic libraries.

In 1986, the library held the first First Golden Leaves Award. Library employees hold this event every year to highlight and honor faculty publications. The library adds a copy of each book to the Library’s collection.

January 1988 marked the start of construction of the new 4th and 5th floors of the University Library addition for $7.4 million. Featuring advanced computer technology and serving a Cal Poly Pomona campus community of nearly 20,000, the Library building now has 205,000 square feet and seating for approximately 2,600 students.

The Library's collection currently has over 1,000,000 microforms, 500,000 books; 58,000 technical reports; 10,000 maps; and 3,500 software packages. As part of "Partners in Progress," Cal Poly Pomona's 50th-anniversary capital campaign established an endowment fund for the continued growth of the University Library collection.

Celebrating a half-century of growth with the University, the campus dedicated the six-story Library on September 18, 1989; during the ceremony the 500,000th volume, Ansel Adams: Letters and Images, was officially added to the Library's collection.

An architectural site study was completed in April 2000. The resulting Library Master Plan formed the basis for a major capital outlay request to renovate and expand the library building to address future needs for capacity and services to support a campus enrollment of 20,000 students. In July 2003, the University Library website added the Rose Float Collection. Later that month, the library announced a major extension that would add an additional wing to the library. Three years later, the library extension groundbreaking ceremony happened. The extension added 101,853 square feet of space in addition to the 205,000 square foot space. This extension added classrooms, additional library space, offices, and a 24-hour computer lab. On June 23, 2008, the library had a soft re-opening with the new extension.

On July 29, 2008, the Chino Hills Earthquake struck, a magnitude 5.4 earthquake south of Cal Poly Pomona. The earthquake did not cause structural damage, but there were lots of cosmetic damage, such as scattered books, cracked paint, and loose light fixtures. The library closed the third to the sixth floor for two days to reshelve all the fallen books. In some aisles, “hundreds of fallen books created impassable piles nearly two feet high."

Harold Schliefer retired as the Library Dean in 2008, Dr. Gilbert (Gil) Brum took over as the Interim Library Dean until the appointment of Dr. Rui (Ray) Wang as the Library Dean. In 2012, the W.K. Kellogg Arabian Horse Library opened to the public. Located on the 1st floor, the W.K. Kellogg Arabian Horse Library houses unique and rare books and periodicals collections, memorabilia, photographs on W.K. Kellogg, Arabian horses, and Cal Poly Pomona. In 2013, the Huntley Gallery opened, named after Don Huntley, alumnus and benefactor of Cal Poly Pomona; the gallery is the permanent home for the Don Huntley Western Art Collection. The gallery features artwork from Cal Poly Pomona faculty, students, and staff each semester. The installation of the gallery was a collaboration between the University Library and the College of Environmental Design. 2013 was the 75th anniversary of the Cal Poly Pomona W.K. Kellogg Arabian Horse Library. Dr. Rui (Ray) Wang stepped down from his position as Library Dean in December 2017 and became Library Dean and Chief Information Officer at the University of New Orleans.

Longtime librarian Emma Gibson took over as Interim Library Dean from 2017 to her retirement in 2020. On April 19, 2018, the Cal Poly Pomona University Library dedicated the Dean's Conference Room to Dr. Claude Coppel and his late wife, Lynn Coppel. In November 2019, the University Library awarded the inaugural Lynn and Claude Coppel Endowed Student Scholarship that recognizes outstanding library student employees and Library Club members who exhibit academic excellence and made exceptional contributions to the University Library and campus community. On August 19, 2019, the Maker Studio officially opened on the 2nd floor of the University Library. The Office of Academic Innovation, the iLab, and grants funded the Maker Studio. It is available for students and faculty. In June 2020, the Cal Poly Pomona campus appointed Patsy (Pat) T. Hawthorne as the Dean of the University Library.

== COVID-19 Pandemic ==
The COVID-19 pandemic led to the building closure of the Cal Poly Pomona University Library. On March 17, 2020, Cal Poly Pomona canceled face-to-face classes in response to the increasing spread to focus on virtual instruction for safety. It led to the building closure of the University Library. With the focus on virtual instruction, the library created a slate of events and services to aid distance learning. In October 2020, the library’s Special Collections and Archives started a project to collect items, stories, photographs, books, and journals related to the COVID-19 pandemic for the Pomona Valley Area. In late April 2021, the University Library opens the Bronco Lockers, a 24-hour locker service to provide library patrons with a pickup service outside the library building. On May 2, 2021, the library did a pilot re-opening for the last couple of weeks of the spring semester. This pilot re-opening consisted of scheduled appointments on the library building’s second floor, emphasizing social distancing and library safety. The first phase of the library pilot re-opening ended on May 21, 2021. The library ended scheduled appointments on August 12, 2021, but continued with indoor mask restrictions as mandated by Los Angeles County. To encourage masking for the Fall 2021 semester, the library created a #MaskUpMonday campaign that got a lot of attention with its positive message and cute mascot. The Library reopened its computer lab to 24-hour operation for 6 days a week starting on September 7, 2021.

== Library Leadership ==
- Lavina Penley, Campus Librarian (1938 - 1952)
- Ruth Hoff, Campus Librarian (1952 - 1954)
- Harold F. Wells, Library Director (1954 - 1983)
- Harold B. Schleifer, Acting Director, Library Director, Library Dean (1983 - 2008)
- Dr. Gilbert (Gil) Brum, Interim Library Dean (2009)
- Dr. Rui (Ray) Wang, Library Dean (2009 - 2017)
- Emma Gibson, Interim Library Dean (2017 - 2020)
- Patsy (Pat) T. Hawthorne, Library Dean (2020–Present)

== Special Collections and Archives ==
Special Collections and Archives consists of 4 main collecting areas surrounding themes relevant to the university's mission. Many resources are available online to help better utilize these collections and get researchers jump-started with their primary source research needs. During the COVID-19 pandemic, all Special Collections and Archives services moved to virtual services. Special Collections and Archives started letting a limited number of researchers into the reading area on a per-reservation basis based on guidance from the health services of LA county.
