= Cal Poly Pomona College of Engineering =

Engineering college of California State Polytechnic University, Pomona

- Motto: Learn by Doing: Making Imagination Real
- Type: Public engineering college
- Established: 1957; 69 years ago
- Parent institution: California State Polytechnic University, Pomona
- Academic affiliations: ABET; California Space Grant Consortium
- Dean: Andrew Ketsdever
- Students: 6,000+ (2023)
- Location: Pomona, California, United States
- Colors: Green, gold, and blue
- Website: www.cpp.edu/engineering/

The Cal Poly Pomona College of Engineering is the engineering college at California State Polytechnic University, Pomona (Cal Poly Pomona) in Pomona, California, United States. Known for its "learn by doing" philosophy, the college's motto, coined by Dean Mahyar A. Amouzegar in 2012, is "Learn by Doing: Making Imagination Real". The college enrolls more than 6,000 undergraduate and graduate students, making it one of the largest engineering colleges in the United States—the 23rd largest in the country, according to the college. As of 2019, it was the largest engineering college in Southern California and the second largest in the California State University system.

In the 2026 edition of U.S. News & World Report's "Best Colleges" rankings, the College of Engineering tied for ninth among undergraduate engineering programs at schools where a doctorate is not offered, its fourth consecutive year in the top ten. In the American Society for Engineering Education's data covering 2022, the college's civil engineering program awarded more bachelor's degrees than any other institution in the United States. Freshman admission to the college's majors is determined through the university's multifactor admission model, which does not consider SAT or ACT scores, and several of its majors—aerospace, civil, computer, electrical, and mechanical engineering—are designated impacted (enrollment-limited), with admission thresholds well above the university baseline.

== History ==
Engineering classes at the Kellogg Campus in Pomona, California of the California Polytechnic began in academic year 1957–58. At the time, the Engineering Center (the current two-story portion of Building 9) had not been finalized and it took two more years, until 1959, to complete. The first class of the College of Engineering graduated in 1960 with 11 graduates in the disciplines of Aeronautical Engineering, Electronic Engineering, Industrial Engineering and Mechanical Engineering. The Department of Chemical & Materials Engineering was formed in 1972.

In 2012, the College of Engineering under the leadership of Amouzegar launched the first issue of its magazine, Xpressions of Xcellence, renamed in 2019 as CPP Engineering. In 2018, under Dean Joseph J. Rencis, the college adopted a strategic plan intended to guide its direction and investment priorities over the following seven years. Developed through a process involving university leadership, department chairs, faculty and staff, industry advisory groups, area community colleges, and students, the plan articulated the college's vision that its Learn by Doing education "prepares engineers to transform imagination into reality" and organized thirteen goals under six focus areas: student success, experiential learning, faculty and staff excellence, culture, resource development and investment, and strategic partnerships and industry engagement. Andrew Ketsdever, previously dean of academic affairs and chief academic officer at Oregon State University–Cascades, became dean of the college on July 10, 2023.

== Academics ==
=== Departments and degree programs ===
The college is organized into seven academic departments: Aerospace Engineering; Chemical and Materials Engineering; Civil Engineering; Electrical and Computer Engineering; Electromechanical Engineering Technology; Industrial and Manufacturing Engineering; and Mechanical Engineering.

The college offers 11 undergraduate degree programs, all of which are accredited by ABET:

- Aerospace Engineering
- Chemical Engineering
- Civil Engineering
- Computer Engineering
- Construction Engineering and Management
- Electrical Engineering
- Electromechanical Systems Engineering Technology
- Electronic Systems Engineering Technology
- Industrial Engineering
- Manufacturing Engineering
- Mechanical Engineering

The college also offers seven master's degree programs:

- Aerospace Engineering (MS)
- Civil Engineering (MS), with options in construction engineering and management, environmental and water resources engineering, geotechnical engineering, structural engineering, and transportation engineering
- Electrical Engineering (MS)
- Engineering Management (MS)
- Materials Engineering (MS)
- Mechanical Engineering (MS)
- Systems Engineering (MS)

=== Facilities and student projects ===
The college's specialized laboratories include a smart automation laboratory equipped with an Intelitek SmartCIM Industry 4.0 manufacturing and automation system, a supersonic wind tunnel laboratory, and an unmanned aerial vehicle laboratory. Student project teams include the Liquid Rocket Lab, which aims to make Cal Poly Pomona the first university to launch a liquid-fueled rocket into space; Formula SAE and Baja SAE vehicle teams; the university's Rose Float program; and American Society of Civil Engineers Concrete Canoe and Steel Bridge teams. Students also take part in national competitions such as NASA's Human Lander Challenge and Cast in Steel.

=== Rankings ===
- In the 2026 U.S. News & World Report "Best Colleges" rankings, the college tied for No. 9 nationally among undergraduate engineering programs at schools where a doctorate is not offered, its fourth consecutive year in the top 10.
- In the 2025 edition of the same rankings, the college was ranked No. 10 overall in that category, with specialty rankings of No. 3 in computer engineering and No. 4 each in aerospace, civil, and electrical engineering.
- Hispanic Outlook on Education ranked the college No. 4 nationally in bachelor's degrees in engineering awarded to Latino students in 2024.

In the American Society for Engineering Education's (ASEE) Engineering & Engineering Technology by the Numbers report covering 2022, the college ranked:

- 1st nationally in bachelor's degrees awarded in civil engineering (328), the most of any U.S. institution
- 9th nationally in engineering bachelor's degrees awarded to Hispanic graduates (404), and 9th in engineering bachelor's degrees awarded to underrepresented minorities overall (428), who earned 37 percent of the college's engineering bachelor's degrees
- 9th nationally in bachelor's degrees awarded in aerospace engineering (161)
- 17th nationally in bachelor's degrees awarded in both mechanical engineering (273) and industrial and manufacturing engineering (102)
- 23rd nationally in engineering undergraduate enrollment, with 5,567 engineering undergraduates in fall 2022
- 31st nationally in total engineering bachelor's degrees awarded (1,158)
- 42nd nationally in engineering bachelor's degrees awarded to women (250)

=== Career outcomes ===
According to the college, its graduates earn an average starting salary of $78,730, the highest among the university's colleges, and its alumni base of more than 25,000 includes engineers at companies such as Boeing, Northrop Grumman, Nvidia, SpaceX, Lockheed Martin, Raytheon, and Collins Aerospace.

== Admissions ==
The California State University system has eliminated the use of SAT and ACT scores in undergraduate admission decisions. Cal Poly Pomona instead determines freshman eligibility for each major through a Multifactor Admission (MFA) model, which combines an applicant's "A–G" grade point average with non-academic factors, including local-area or military status, first-generation status, youth services background, extracurricular activities, and participation in educational programs; additional mathematics coursework is considered for impacted STEM majors. An applicant's "CPP Index" is calculated as (A–G GPA × 1000) + 450, plus values earned in the campus admission categories. California residents who graduate from California high schools are considered admissible if they earn a 2.50 or greater A–G GPA and a minimum eligibility index of 2,950, while non-residents must earn a 3.00 or greater A–G GPA.

For the 2025–2026 application cycle, five of the college's majors—aerospace, civil, computer, electrical, and mechanical engineering—were designated impacted, with minimum CPP Index thresholds substantially above the university baseline of 2,950:

College of Engineering freshman CPP Index thresholds, 2025–2026 application cycle
Program	Impacted	Minimum index (local)	Minimum index (non-local)
Aerospace Engineering	Yes	4,658	—
Chemical Engineering	No	2,950	2,950
Civil Engineering	Yes	4,385	—
Computer Engineering	Yes	4,019	—
Construction Engineering and Management	No	2,950	2,950
Electrical Engineering	Yes	4,465	—
Electromechanical Systems Engineering Technology	No	2,950	2,950
Electronic Systems Engineering Technology	No	2,950	2,950
Industrial Engineering	No	2,950	2,950
Manufacturing Engineering	No	2,950	2,950
Mechanical Engineering	Yes	4,587	—

=== Freshman class profile ===
Admission is administered at the university level through the multifactor admission model rather than by the college. For fall 2025, Cal Poly Pomona received 48,258 first-time freshman applications, admitted 35,688 applicants (about 74 percent), and enrolled an entering class of 4,004 students with an average high school GPA of 3.70; about 55 percent of the enrolled class earned a high school GPA of 3.75 or higher. Engineering accounted for about 19 percent of the bachelor's degrees the university conferred in 2024–25 (about 21 percent including engineering technology programs), the second-largest share of any discipline at the university after business.
