= Collins College of Hospitality Management =

Coordinates: 34°2′59″N 117°48′55″W

Cal Poly Pomona Collins College of Hospitality Management
- Motto: Shaping Future Hospitality Leaders
- Type: Public; Space grant
- Established: 1973
- Parent institution: California State Polytechnic University, Pomona
- Dean: Margie F. Jones, Ph.D
- Location: Pomona, California, U.S.
- Website: www.cpp.edu/collins

The Collins College of Hospitality Management is a college part of the California State Polytechnic University, Pomona (Cal Poly Pomona). Founded in 1973, it was the first hospitality management studies program in California and its thousand students make it the largest such school in the state. As of 2010, The Collins College of Hospitality Management is ranked third in the nation by restaurant executives. Margie Ferree Jones serves as dean of the college and the James A. Collins Distinguished Chair. With approximately 1,400 undergraduate students, the college is the largest of its kind in the country.

== Name ==
The official name of the college is The Collins College of Hospitality Management, with the definite article The part of the college's official name. Publications such as the Los Angeles Times and Cal Poly Pomona's electronic magazine PolyCentric have referred to the college without The as part of the name.

== Admissions ==
Admissions to The Collins College are on a rolling basis along with all other colleges at the university.

Undergraduate application count
	2006	2007	2008	2009	2010	2011	2012
Applied	496	572	625	574	737	664	712
Accepted	393	424	397	384	342	457	566
Admission rate	79.2%	74.1%	63.5%	66.9%	46.4%	68.8%	79.4%
Enrolled	125	76	98	101	59	112	146

=== Freshmen admissions ===
First-time freshmen profile
	2004	2005	2006	2007	2008	2009	2010	2011	2012
Enrollment	85	103	125	107	98	101	59	112	146
Average GPA	3.16	3.24	3.26	3.25	3.24	3.34	3.45	3.29	3.31
Average SAT	986	997	1002	997	1044	1065	1055	1046	1019

== Industry support ==
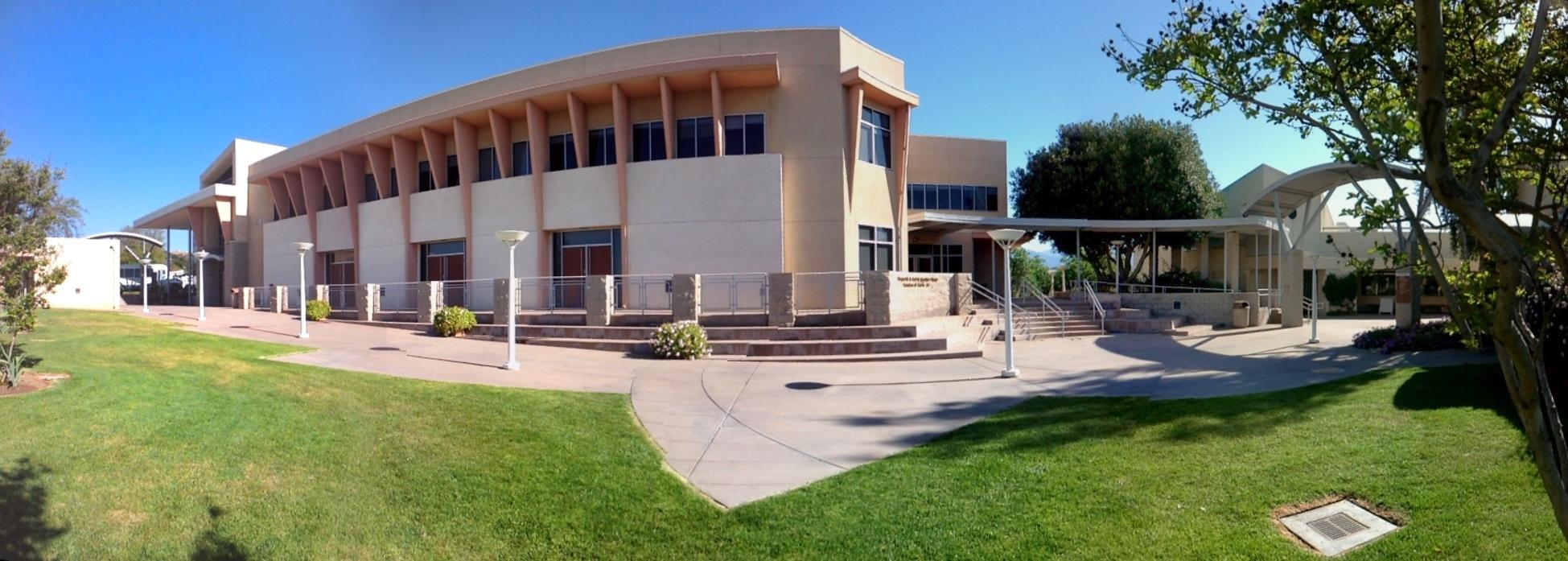

The Collins College is housed in three buildings, which were built with private donations. The college is named after Carol and Jim Collins, who are the primary benefactors of the program. They have given more than $10 million in the last 23 years and in December 2008, they pledged to match $5 million in donations in order to build a new $10 million building. The building would allow the college to accommodate more students and house a graduate studies program.

In November 2010, The J. Willard and Alice S. Marriott Foundation awarded $2 million to The Collins College of Hospitality Management for the academic building expansion. This gift was matched by Carol and Jim Collins.

Hae and Shina Park have also donated more than $2 million to the college. Hae Park, who owns and manages Cal Pacific Realty, is an alumnus of the program. Additional industry support has come from Carl Karcher Enterprises and Marriott Corp. In December 2010, Eugene Park, son of Hae and Shina, pledged $1 million to the college's academic building expansion. Eugene Park is also an alumnus of the college. The gift was matched by Carol and Jim Collins.

Panda Restaurant Group founders Andrew and Peggy Cherng, donated $2.5 million to The Collins College in 2011.

== School to college ==
The college was previously named The Collins School of Hospitality Management. In July 2008, Cal Poly Pomona President J. Michael Ortiz designated the school a college. There are only six hospitality management colleges nationwide.

== Horsehill Vineyards wine ==
The Collins College and the Cal Poly Pomona College of Agriculture partner to produce Horsehill Vineyards wine. The inaugural vintage of Horsehill Vineyards Zinfandel Rosé won the Gold Medal, Best of Class in the Best Rosé Limited Production category at the 70th annual Los Angeles International Wine & Spirits Competition. The 2008 Horsehill Vineyards Zinfandel received a bronze medal. Horsehill Vineyards 2009 Rosé also won a gold medal at the 71st annual Los Angeles International Wine & Spirits Competition.

Horsehill Vineyards wine is made from grapes grown on the Cal Poly Pomona campus and is one of only a few wines made from grapes grown in Los Angeles County, California. The colleges partnered with master winemaker Jon McPherson at South Coast Winery in Temecula, California, to produce and bottle the rosé for the university. Roughly two-thirds of the 2008 harvest yielded 328 cases of Horsehill Vineyards Zinfandel Rosé, which have been sold exclusively at the Collins College's Restaurant at Kellogg Ranch.

Third-generation winemaker Don Galleano used the other third from the 2008 harvest to make a Zinfandel, which aged for about six months in oak barrels at Galleano Winery in Mira Loma, California. The Zinfandel won a bronze in the category Limited Production Zinfandel from 2007 or Later at the 70th annual Los Angeles International Wine & Spirits Competition.

The Zinfandel vines stem from the De Ambrogio Ranch, which was razed in 2001 for development in Rancho Cucamonga, California. Geyser Peak Winery made a Zinfandel from the De Ambrogio Vineyard, which was located across the street from what would become the Rancho Cucamonga Civic Center on the corner of Foothill Boulevard (old Route 66) and Haven Avenue. Galleano combed the ranch for the best vines before it was demolished for development. He donated 400 grapevine cuttings to the university.

Proceeds from the wine sales support a culinary garden at Cal Poly Pomona and the ongoing production of Horsehill Vineyards wine. Produce from the garden is incorporated into the menu at the Restaurant at Kellogg Ranch.

== Collins Magazine ==

The Collins magazine is published twice a year by The Collins College of Hospitality Management and distributed to alumni and friends of the college. Private endowment funds pay for the magazine. The first issue of Collins magazine and the Collins College's Web site each received an Award of Excellence in the 2009 APEX Awards for Publication Excellence. The APEX Awards is an annual competition for writers, editors, publications staff, and business and nonprofit communicators. The Fall 2008 issue of Collins won in the New Magazines & Journals category. The Web site won for New Web & Intranet Sites.The 2013 CASE VII Awards of Excellence honored the Spring and Fall 2012 issues with the Silver CASE Award of Excellence for the 2012 spring and fall editions of Collins Magazine in the category of Communications and Marketing Programs.

== The Restaurant at Kellogg Ranch ==
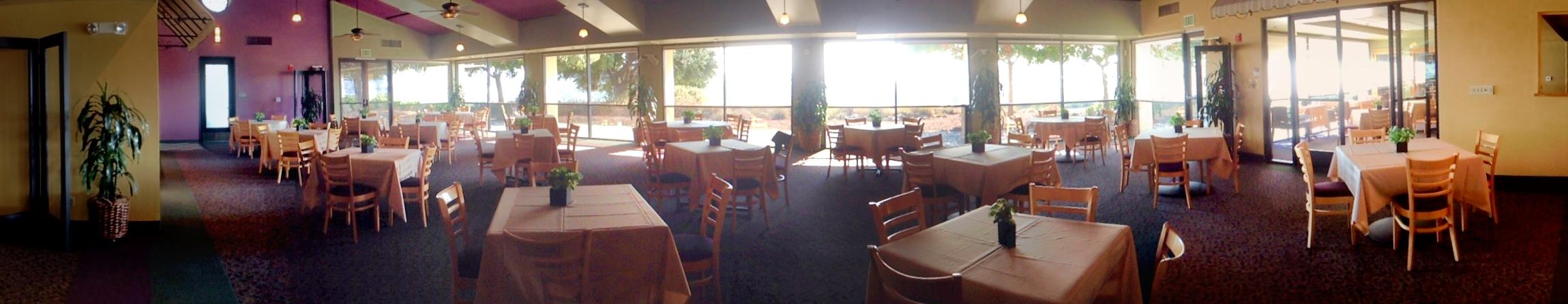
The Restaurant at Kellogg Ranch

The Restaurant at Kellogg Ranch is operated and managed by students of The Collins College, serving both lunch and dinner, as a part of their undergraduate degree requirements. The restaurant embodies Cal Poly Pomona's learn-by-doing tradition and is a central component to The Collins College of Hospitality Management's curriculum.

Unlike most restaurants, the Restaurant at Kellogg Ranch operates as a not-for-profit organization. Financial bookkeeping is managed under the umbrella of the Cal Poly Pomona Foundation, which operates as a public-benefit charitable-educational organization under the provisions of the California Revenue and Taxation Code, Section 23701(d) and the United States Internal Revenue Code, Section 501(c)(3). Gratuities are considered donations to the restaurant and college and are not directly given to student servers.

== Facilities ==
The Margaret M. & Carl N. Karcher Plaza (Founders of Carl's Jr.) and Building 79A

Building 79A

Building 79B

== Expansion project ==
Thanks to more than $10 million in private donations, The Collins College of Hospitality Management underwent a significant building expansion.

Construction began in October 2013, and was projected to be completed by the summer of 2015.

The Collins College Expansion Project comprises two new buildings: a classroom and faculty building and a student commons building. They will be designated as Buildings 72 and 73.

The classroom/faculty building will be used for faculty workspace and classrooms. The faculty workspace will include two executive director offices, an executive admin and lobby space, six faculty offices, a conference room, storage, two 24-station graduate student classrooms, two 48-station lecture rooms and a 32-station lecture room. The student commons will have a graduate student social space, two group study rooms, a spacious student recreation area and a "Grab n' go" food/beverage cart.

"The Collins College Expansion and Upgrades" blog is available online as an interactive tool to keep the public up-to-date with the latest renovations and phases of the expansion project.

== Outreach ==
The Collins College hosts and participates in numerous outreach events to educate prospective students and high schools about the programs and opportunities it offers.

In November 2012, The Collins College, the CSU Hospitality Management Educational Initiative, and the California Restaurant Association Educational Foundation hosted Experience Hospitality: The Los Angeles High School Summit 2012 at LA Live. More than 150 students from Los Angeles-area high schools got an exclusive tour of LA Live venues - including Katsuya, the Staples Center, Nokia Theatre, and JW Marriott - to show them first-hand what a career in hospitality could look like. The event was sponsored by the California Hotel and Lodging Association Educational Foundation and Levy Restaurants.
