= Cal Poly Pomona College of Education and Integrative Studies =

- Motto: Instrumentum Disciplinae (Latin: "Application of Knowledge")
- Type: Public College
- Established: 1938
- Parent institution: Cal Poly Pomona
- Dean: Peggy Kelly
- Students: 1,489 (Fall 2016)
- Undergraduates: 877 (Fall 2016)
- Postgraduates: 612 (Fall 2016)
- Location: Pomona, California, U.S. 34.0579°N 117.8245°W
- Colors: Green and Gold
- Website: www.cpp.edu/ceis

The College of Education and Integrative Studies (CEIS) at Cal Poly Pomona has four departments.

== Admissions ==
First-Time Freshmen Profile
	2004	2005	2006	2007	2008	2009	2010	2011	2012
Enrollment	85	85	89	81	49	68	35	52	79
Average GPA	3.00	3.22	3.16	3.22	3.25	3.41	3.29	3.24	3.16
Average SAT	800	927	906	986	955	979	987	949	966
