= Payscale (company) =

American compensation software and data company

- Website type: Private
- Available in: Multilingual
- Founded: January 1, 2002; 24 years ago
- Headquarters: Boston, Massachusetts, U.S.
- Founders: Joe Giordano; John Gaffney
- Key people: Chris Hays, CEO
- Industry: Internet
- Website: www.payscale.com
- Commercial: Yes
- Registration: Optional
- Current status: Active

Payscale (originally styled as PayScale) is an American compensation software and data company that collects and provides information about employment compensation.

== History ==
The website was launched on January 1, 2002. It was founded by Joe Giordano and John Gaffney. Mike Metzger was CEO from 2004 to 2019. Scott Torrey, a 20-year veteran of SAP Concur, started as CEO on August 26, 2019, and stepped down on November 16, 2021. Alex Hart was then named CEO in November 2021. In January 2024, Chris Hays assumed the role of CEO.

On April 24, 2014, Warburg Pincus acquired Payscale in a deal worth up to $100 million.

On April 25, 2019, Francisco Partners announced a majority investment in Payscale at an enterprise value of $325 million.

In 2021, Payscale merged with Payfactors, a leading competitor. The new company operates under the Payscale brand. Later that year, Payscale acquired pay equity and compensation management company CURO. In 2022, Payscale acquired Agora, a software development company focused on pay transparency and employee experience.

== Business model and offerings ==
Payscale started by collecting crowdsourced compensation data from employees and providing the collected data to employers. Its software as a service (SaaS) offerings have evolved to draw from multiple compensation data sources. Business customers can also manage their employee compensation strategy and structure within the company's platform and perform compensation analytics. For employees, the service works via the Internet by collecting information from individuals about their job profile and salary data, which is then compared to others like them. The individuals who submit such information receive a free report on their market worth.

The company generates revenue by selling SaaS subscriptions, compensation data and services to employers, to help them assess market rates for hiring, benchmarking and budgeting, and by targeted advertising to employees that visit its website.

Payscale surveys its users' income and background, and since 2007, it has published an annual ranking of American colleges and universities by their estimated return on investment. The rankings have been popular with the public but controversial among scholars of higher education.

Payscale puts on an annual compensation industry event called Compference and publishes original research on compensation-related topics such as gender pay gaps, college return on investment, and salary history.
