= List of Cal Poly Pomona people =

This list of Cal Poly Pomona people includes notable matriculating students, and alumni that have graduated or are non-matriculating students of California State Polytechnic University, Pomona, a public university, and one of the 23 general campuses of the California State University located in Pomona, California.

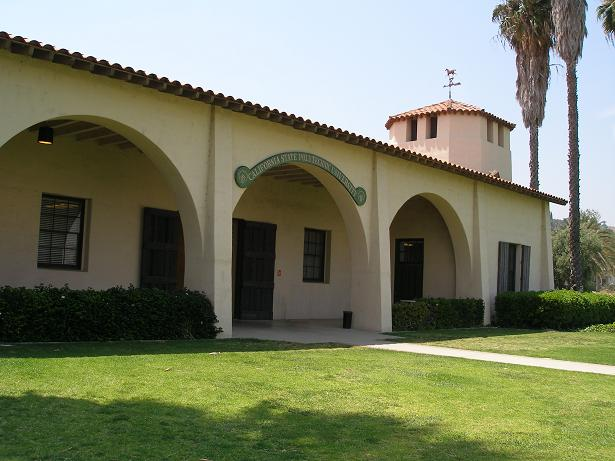
Kellogg horse ranch, the first building to be erected on campus

== Alumni ==
=== Art & entertainment ===
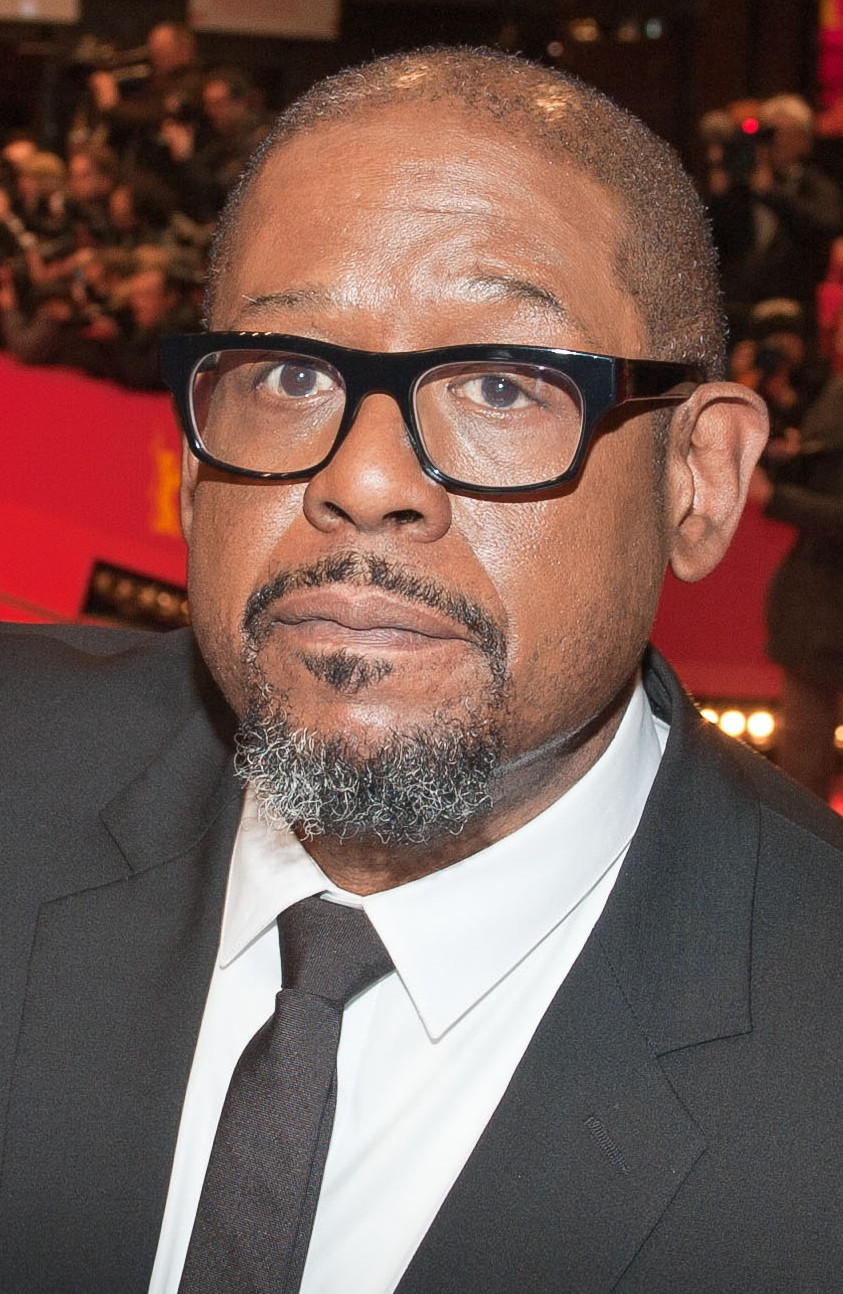
Academy Award winner Forest Whitaker

Name	Class year	Notability	Ref.
American Artist	2011	Alpert Award-winning artist	
Sara A. Carter	Attended c. 2000s (Note: The specific year is not known.)	Fox News journalist, appointee to the Office of National Drug Control Policy	
Roy Conli	1983	Academy Award-winning producer (Big Hero 6)	
Dr Disrespect	Popular livestreamer, esports streamer of the year	Student (basketball team)	
Nguyễn Cao Kỳ Duyên	Vietnamese-American personality and co-host of Thuy Nga's Paris by Night shows	Student	
Kye Palmer	Trumpet player who performs with The Tonight Show Band	Student (B.S. Engineering)	
Will Pan	American-born Taiwanese singer, rapper and drama actor; started his career as a host of Channel V programs	Student	
Michael Steger	Actor; best known for his role as Navid Shirazi on The CW's teen drama series 90210	Student	
Carol Vaness	Metropolitan Opera soprano	Student (B.A. Music 1974)	
Forest Whitaker	Academy Award-winning actor (Panic Room, The Crying Game, The Last King of Scotland), director (Waiting to Exhale) and host of UPN's revival of The Twilight Zone	Student	
James Williamson	Guitarist for punk rock band The Stooges; later vice president for Technology Standards for Sony	Student (B.S. Engineering 1982)	
Larry Wilmore	N/A	Actor, comedian, writer (The Daily Show, The Nightly Show with Larry Wilmore, The Office; won aPrimetime Emmy for The Bernie Mac Show)	
Marc Wilmore	Attended 1990s	Television writer and producer (In Living Color, The PJs, The Simpsons, The Tonight Show with Jay Leno)	

=== Athletics ===
Alumni	Notability	Relationship to Cal Poly Pomona	Citation
Dan Beebe	Former commissioner of the Ohio Valley Conference, 1989–2003, and Big 12 Conference, 2007–2011	Student athlete	
Jonathan Bornstein	Professional soccer player who plays as a left midfielder/defender for the United States men's national soccer team and Chicago Fire FC in the MLS	Student athlete	
Chi Cheng	Olympic bronze medalist; world record setter; Taiwanese political leader; considered by many the top female Asian athlete of the 20th century	Student athlete (B.A. Kinesiology 1971)	
Glenn Davis	Won the Maxwell Award in 1944 and the Heisman Trophy in 1946; among the runners-up in 1944 and 1945; named the Associated Press Male Athlete of the Year in 1946	Student athlete	
Fred Ford	Football halfback for the Buffalo Bills and Los Angeles Chargers of the American Football League	Student athlete	
Roman Gabriel	Former NFL starting quarterback for the Los Angeles Rams and Philadelphia Eagles; coach of the football team during its last years	Football coach	
Dave Mirra	X Games multiple medalist, world record setter, considered by many the top BMX rider of the 20th century	Student athlete (1995)	
Don Nomura	Baseball agent dealing primarily with Japanese baseball players such as Hideo Nomo	Student athlete	
Violet Palmer	First female referee in U.S. professional sports; NBA referee; member of 1985 and 1986 NCAA championship teams	Student athlete	
Mark Peel	James Beard Foundation Award-nominated chef; founder of the La Brea Bakery	Student	
Joe Prokop	Former professional football player for the New York Jets	Student athlete	
Kim Rhode	Medalist in five separate Olympic Games, including three gold medals, for double trap shooting	Student athlete	
Everett Sharp	Football offensive tackle in the National Football League for the Washington Redskins	Student athlete	
Al Smith	Football Linebacker for the Houston Oilers in the National Football League	Student athlete	
Art Williams	Former professional basketball player; won an NBA Championship with the Boston Celtics in 1974	Student athlete	
Walter Ray Williams Jr.	Professional ten-pin bowler who holds the all-time PBA titles record with 47; seven-time PBA Player of the Year; six-time world horseshoe pitching champion; six-time ESPY Award winner	Student (B.S. Physics 1984)	
Jim Zorn	NFL player; NFLPA's NFC Offensive Rookie of the Year (1976); starting quarterback for the Seattle Seahawks during their first seven seasons (1976–1983); head coach of the Washington Redskins in the National Football League (2008–2010)	Student athlete	

=== Business ===
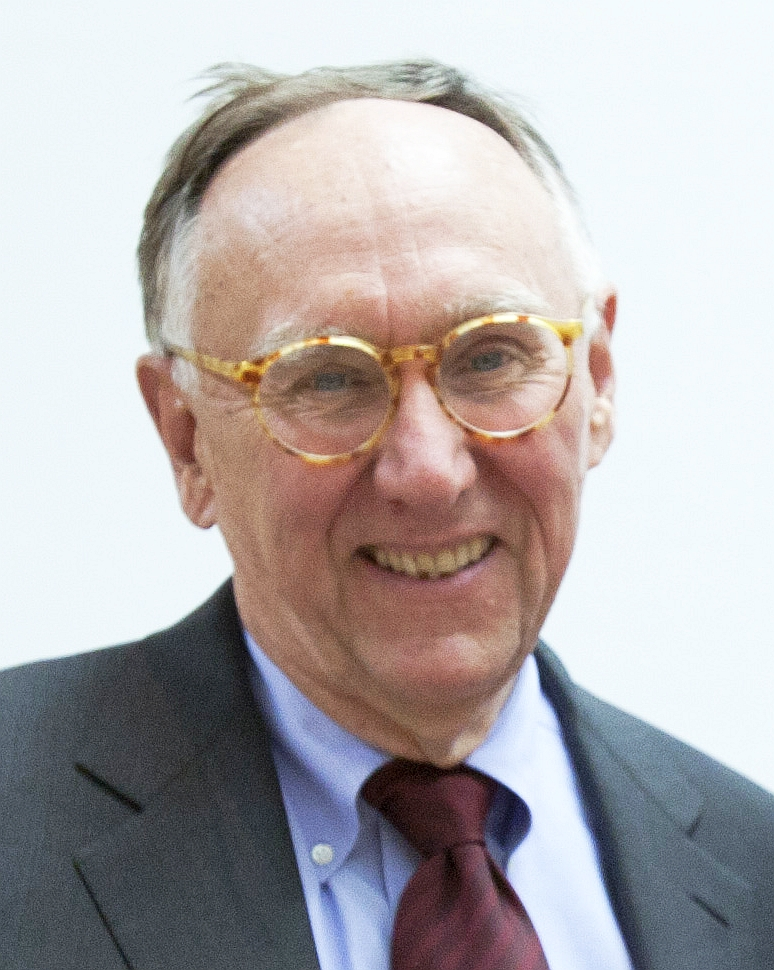
Jack Dangermond

Alumni	Notability	Relationship to Cal Poly Pomona	Citation
Beny Alagem	Entrepreneur; founder of Packard Bell Electronics; owner of the Beverly Hilton Hotel in Santa Monica, California	Student (1970s)	
Jack Dangermond	Founder of ESRI consulting firm, the largest manufacturer and seller of GIS in the world	Student (1967); Honorary Doctorate (2005)	
Eddy Hartenstein	Co-president of Tribune Company; publisher and CEO of the Los Angeles Times and Los Angeles Times Magazine	Student (B.S. Aerospace Engineering 1971)	
Kevin Lyman	Creator of touring music and extreme sports festivals called the Warped Tour, the Taste of Chaos and the Mayhem tours	Student (Recreation Administration)	
Satoshi Nakamoto	Alleged founder of bitcoin digital currency	Student (B.S. Physics)	
Paul Tollett	Along with brother Perry Tollett, founder of Coachella and Stagecoach, and developers for the Pomona Fox Theater and the Glass House in Pomona	Student (Chemical Engineering)	
Corrinne Yu	Game programmer	Student (1980s)	

=== Education ===
Alumni	Notability	Relationship to Cal Poly Pomona	Citation
Stewart Donaldson	Author, psychologist, evaluation research scientist	Student (B.A. Behavioral Science 1984)	

=== Government ===
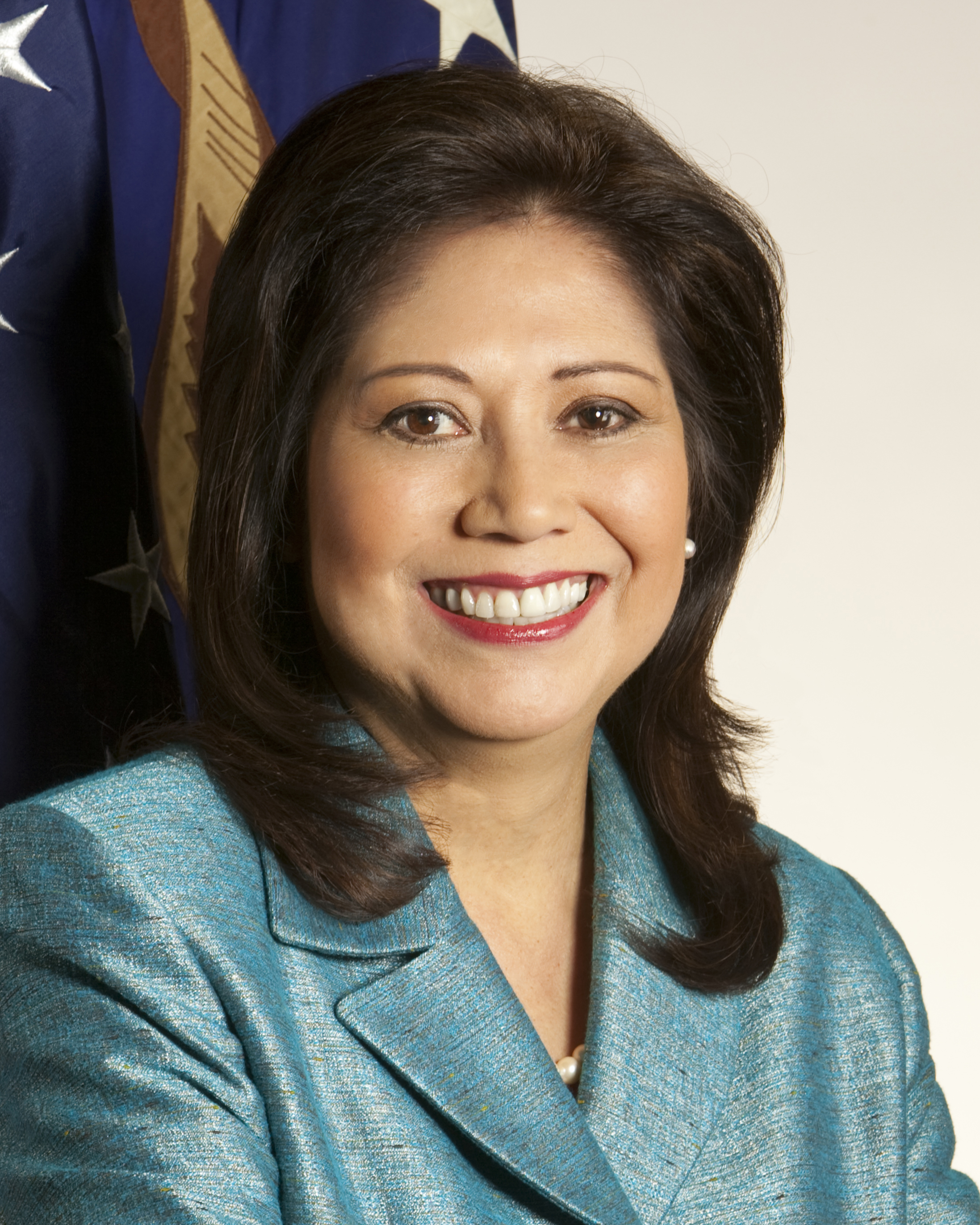
United States Secretary of Labor Hilda Solis

Alumni	Notability	Relationship to Cal Poly Pomona	Citation
Jim Brulte	Former Republican leader of the California State Senate	Student (B.A. Political Science 1980)	
Jonathan D. Farrar	Chief of Mission of the United States Interests Section in Havana, Cuba (USINT)	Student (B.A. Political Science 1978)	
Ken Maddox	Member of the California State Assembly	Student (B.S. in communication arts)	
Fiona Nave	Member of the Montana House of Representatives	Student (B.S. in applied mathematics)	
Geoffrey Okamoto	Economist and assistant secretary of the Treasury	Student (B.S. Business Administration, Computer Information Systems 2008)	
Richard Pombo	Republican member of the United States House of Representatives	Student (attended three years)	
Marie Royce	Republican Assistant Secretary of State for Educational and Cultural Affairs under President Donald Trump, recipient of 1994 Distinguished Alumni Award	Student (B.S. Marketing Management and Human Resources 1984), Former Faculty	
Hilda Solis	Democratic United States Secretary of Labor under President Barack Obama, former member of the United States House of Representatives	Student (B.A. Political Science 1979)	

== Faculty ==
=== Active faculty ===
Faculty	Notability
Gabriel Georgiades	Professor of aerospace engineering and author; has been the regional chair, chair-elect, VC of Education and Advisory Committee representative; former "Evolution of Flight" program officer for the San Gabriel Valley Region of the American Institute of Aeronautics and Astronautics
Alvaro Huerta	Joint professor of Urban & Region Planning and Ethnic & Women’s Studies, community organizer, writer, and recipient of the American Planning Association's Paul Davidoff award
Christoph Kapeller	Architecture lecturer; founding member of Norwegian firm Snohetta; design leader for the Bibliotheca Alexandrina in Alexandria, Egypt
Thomas Keith	Filmmaker, educator, and anti-sexism activist
Nancy Kyes	Adjunct theater lecturer; former actress; frequent collaborator of filmmaker John Carpenter
Renford Reese	Professor of Political Science; author; founder and director of the "Colorful Flags" program aimed at reducing ethnic and racial tensions, servicing 17 school districts and a variety of law enforcement, social service, and other agencies in Southern California
Hilda Solis	Member of the Los Angeles County Board of Supervisors, Democratic United States Secretary of Labor under President Barack Obama; former member of the United States House of Representatives; scholar-in-residence starting in 2014

=== Retired, deceased, and former faculty ===
Faculty	Notability
Virginia Hamilton Adair (deceased)	Poet, author of Ants on the Melon
Aaron Betsky	Served as visiting instructor in the Department of Architecture
Paul Caligiuri	Head soccer coach and National Soccer Hall of Fame player whose 1990 "Goal Heard Round the World" (sic) launched the United States into the FIFA World Cup for the first time in 40 years; resigned as head coach after the 2008 season
Craig Ellwood	Lecturer at the Department of Architecture; influential Mid Century Modern architect
Ray Kappe	Former faculty; founding chair of the Department of Architecture; later founded the Southern California Institute of Architecture
Saul Landau	Director of digital media programs, noted internationally for his films and writing on domestic policy and cultural issues; recipient of a 1980 Emmy
John T. Lyle	Professor of landscape architecture; namesake of the Lyle Center for Regenerative Studies at Cal Poly Pomona and the Lyle plaza at the entrance to Adam Joseph Lewis Center for Environmental Studies at Oberlin College
Thom Mayne	Former professor in the Department of Architecture; principal of Morphosis; Pritzker Prize laureate; co-founder of Southern California Institute of Architecture
Ronald Muldrow (deceased)	Jazz guitarist and former member of the music faculty
Richard Neutra	Lecturer in the early days of the Department of Architecture; influential Mid Century Modern architect featured on the cover of Time magazine
Donald H. Pflueger	Historian, educator, prolific author of local stories; a founding member of the Glendora Historical Society and Pomona Valley Historical Society; served on the board of directors of the Historical Society of Southern California
James Pulliam	Modernist, instructor and campus architect; designed the bookstore, W. Keith and Janet Kellogg Art Gallery, and student union building (Bronco Student Center)
Michele Saee	Visiting instructor in the Department of Architecture, 1998–1999
Raphael Soriano	Noted modernist architect who experimented with steel in residential construction; appointed Special Sessions Instructor
Takeo Uesugi (deceased)	Professor emeritus in Landscape Architecture noted for his work in Japanese gardens; designed the garden at The Washington Center in Washington, D.C., among other notable landmarks
Martín Vásquez	Assistant association football (soccer) coach in 1999 and 2000; head coach of C.D. Chivas USA, in Major League Soccer (MLS)
Michael Woo	Dean of the College of Environmental Design; former Los Angeles city councilman; in 1993 became the first Asian American to run for mayor of a major city; garnered 46 percent of the vote but lost the race for mayor of Los Angeles to Richard Riordan
Richard Saul Wurman	Former Dean of the College of Environmental Design, founder of the TED conference, credited with coining the term "information architect"
Bernard Zimmerman	Modernist architect, architecture instructor for over 30 years, helped co-found the department along with Ray Kappe

== University presidents ==
The following people have served as presidents of Cal Poly Pomona:

#	Name	Term	Citation
1	Julian A. McPhee	1938–1966	
2	Robert C. Kramer	1966–1977	
3	Hugh O. LaBounty	1977–1991	
4	Bob H. Suzuki	1991–2003	
5	J. Michael Ortiz	2003–2014	
6	Soraya M. Coley	2015–2025	
-	Iris S. Levine (interim)	2025–2026	
7	Vanya Quiñones	2026–present	

== Honorary degrees ==
Cal Poly Pomona has conferred 27 honorary doctorate degrees since 1969.

Name	Degree	Year	Notes	Citation
Emory W. Morris	Doctor of Humane Letters	1969	Philanthropist	
Gwynna M. Morris	Doctor of Humane Letters	1969	Philanthropist	
Russell G. Mawby	Doctor of Science	1989	Philanthropist	
~~Bill Cosby~~	~~Doctor of Humane Letters~~	1992	Actor, rescinded 18 November 2015	
James A. Collins	Doctor of Humane Letters	1992	Businessman and philanthropist	
Michi Nishiura Weglyn	Doctor of Humane Letters	1993	Author	
Charles Brown Voorhis (posthumous)	Doctor of Laws	1995	Philanthropist	
Norman Williamson Jr.	Doctor of Letters	1995	Philanthropist and descendant of W.K. Kellogg	
Charles R. Oliver	Doctor of Science	1996	Philanthropist	
W.K. Kellogg (posthumous)	Doctor of Humane Letters	1998	Founder of Kellogg's and philanthropist	
Will Keith Kellogg II	Doctor of Humane Letters	1998	Philanthropist	
Julia Child	Doctor of Humane Letters	2000	Chef, author, and television personality, host of The French Chef	
Jack Dangermond	Doctor of Humane Letters	2005	Business executive and environmental scientist, co-founder of the Environmental Systems Research Institute (ESRI)	
Stuart Sperber	Doctor of Science	2007	Businessman, co-founder of Valley Crest Tree Company	
Andrew Cherng	Doctor of Humane Letters	2008	Founder and chairman of the board for Panda Express Restaurant Group	
Richard N. Frank	Doctor of Humane Letters	2009	Entrepreneur, chairman of Lawry's Restaurants, Inc.	
Sarah L. Ludwick	Doctor of Humane Letters	2010	Philanthropist	
Arthur J. Ludwick	Doctor of Science	2010	Philanthropist	
Don B. Huntley	Doctor of Science	2009	Businessman, farmer, owner of Huntley Moore Farms	
Ronald R. Simons	Doctor of Humane Letters	2012	Cal Poly Pomona administrator	
Joan Robinson-Berry	Doctor of Science	2019	Philanthropist and vice president of engineering, modifications and maintenance for Boeing Global Services	
Ronald W. Gregoire	Doctor of Humane Letters	2014	Philanthropist	
Eddy W. Hartenstein	Doctor of Science	2014	Businessman and alumnus	
Paul Anka	Doctor of Fine Arts	2013	Singer, songwriter, and actor	
Hae Park	Doctor of Humane Letters	2013	Philanthropist	
Diane G. Miller	Doctor of Science	2019	Director of Global Cyber Education and Workforce Development at Northrop Grumman	
Bob Weis	Doctor of Humane Letters	2021	President of Walt Disney Imagineering	
Violet Palmer	Doctor of Humane Letters	2022	NBA referee and alumnus	
Larry Gates	Doctor of Science	2022	Philanthropist and alumnus	
Clark D. Rucker	Doctor of Science	2023	Retired Boeing executive and alumnus	
Sean Yu	Doctor of Humane Letters	2023	Businessman, philanthropist and alumnus	
David and Ruth Singelyn	Doctor of Humane Letters	2024	Philanthropists and alumnus	
Mike Huggins	Doctor of Science	2025	Chief engineer, Aerospace Directorate, Air Force Research Laboratory, and alumnus	
Grace Napolitano	Doctor of Humane Letters	2025	Politician, former U.S. House representative	
