= Cal Poly Pomona academics =

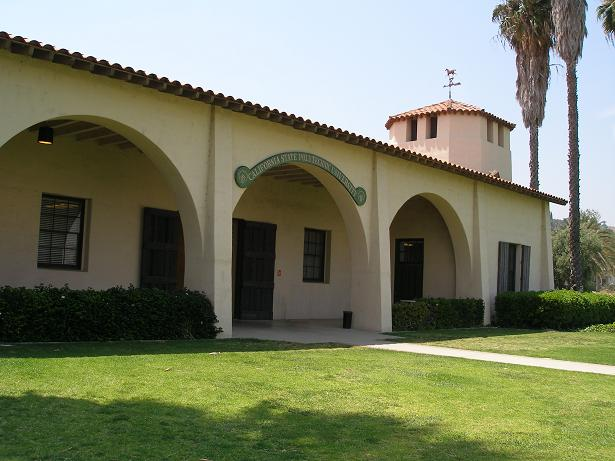
First building to be erected on the Cal Poly Pomona campus — Kellogg horse stables

The California State Polytechnic University, Pomona (Cal Poly Pomona) is organized into seven academic colleges, one extension college, and one professional school. These units provide 65 majors, 20 master's degree programs and 13 teaching credentials/certificates.

== Organization ==
=== Colleges ===
- College of Agriculture: The College of Agriculture offers instruction in 12 majors and 11 options leading to the bachelor of science degree. Over 700 acres (2.8 km^{2}) of university-owned land are available for pastures, crops, groves, and ornamental plantings. The university shares with the University of California, Riverside, the distinction of having the only agriculture programs in Southern California. Farmlands flank the campus, giving a stark contrast to a stereotypical urban university.
- College of Business Administration: Cal Poly Pomona is one of the 500 institutions worldwide that are accredited by Association to Advance Collegiate Schools of Business (AACSB International) at both graduate and undergraduate levels.
- College of Education and Integrative Studies.
- College of Engineering: The College of Engineering has the largest engineering and computer science programs in California. The college was established in 1957 and has an active enrollment of 4,500 students in seven academic departments. The college graduates one of every fourteen engineers in the state. Each year, nearly 700 engineers obtain degrees in the various disciplines. Cal Poly Pomona has the second largest civil engineering department in the United States (after Texas A&M University in College Station) with over 1,000 undergraduates enrolled in that major alone. In 2010, the Cal Poly Pomona's College of Engineering was ranked 5th in the nation by U.S. News & World Report based on peer assessment, student selectivity, financial resources, and other factors in the “Universities-Master’s” category for public universities. The Department of Chemical and Materials Engineering was formed in 1972 and is accredited by ABET, Inc. (formerly the Accreditation Board for Engineering and Technology) and by the American Institute of Chemical Engineers (AIChE).
- College of Environmental Design: The planning programs at Cal Poly Pomona evolved from the undergraduate landscape architecture program that originally was part of the School of Agriculture. After approval of the creation of a new School of Environmental Design, the landscape and urban planning programs moved into their current building in January 1971. The Department of Urban Planning was created and soon after a Department of Architecture. Department of Urban Planning was renamed "Department of Urban and Regional Planning" in 1983 to reflect an expanded program. The School was renamed the "College of Environmental Design" in 1988. The Department of Art was transferred to Environmental Design from the College of Arts in 1992. Cal Poly Pomona is one of four NAAB-accredited public architecture universities in California along with California Polytechnic State University (Cal Poly San Luis Obispo), University of California, Berkeley (UC Berkeley), and University of California Los Angeles (UCLA). The Architecture undergraduate program was ranked 15th nationally by the journal DesignIntelligence in 2008 in its annual edition of "America's Best Architecture & Design Schools." Unlike rankings for other programs which compare Cal Poly Pomona to other masters universities, DesignIntelligence ranked all national and research universities. In 2002 the department admitted 15 percent of undergraduate applicants, and as of 2006, the department received nearly 2,000 applicants for just 100 spots making it the most selective program of the university.
- College of Letters, Arts, and Social Sciences: The College of Letters, Arts, and Social Sciences (C.L.A.S.S.) provides academic work in more than 20 degree and certificate programs.
- College of Science: The College of Science offers majors in nine fields leading to bachelor of science degree.

=== Extension program ===
- College of the Extended University: The College of the Extended University delivers programs to the community in and around the university campus.

.

=== Professional college ===
- The Collins College of Hospitality Management: The college was founded in 1973 being the first and largest four-year hospitality management degree program in California.

== Majors ==
List of undergraduate majors offered at Cal Poly Pomona (52)

College of Agriculture (6)

- Bachelor of Science in Agricultural Science
- Bachelor of Science in Animal Health Science
- Bachelor of Science in Animal Science with subplans in Animal Science, Pre-Veterinary Science/Graduate School
- Bachelor of Science in Apparel Merchandising & Managementwith subplans in Design and Production, Fashion Retailing, Textile Technology and Sustainability
- Bachelor of Science in Food Science and Technologywith subplans in Culinology, General, Science and Technology
- Bachelor of Science in Nutrition with subplans in Dietetics, Nutrition and Health, Nutrition Science

College of Business Administration (1)

- Bachelor of Science in Business Administration with subplans in Accounting, Computer Information Systems, E-Business, Finance, Real Estate and Law, International Business, Management and Human Resources, Marketing Management, Technology and Operations Management

College of Education or Integrative Studies (2)

- Bachelor of Arts in Early Childhood Studies with subplans in Early Childhood Teaching, ITEP: Extensive Support, ITEP, Mild/Moderate Support, Multilingual Teaching, Non-Teaching, Pre-K to Grade 3
- Bachelor of Arts in Liberal Studies with subplans in General Studies, ITEP: Extensive Support, ITEP, Mild/Moderate Support, Pre-Credential

College of Engineering (11)

- Bachelor of Science in Aerospace Engineering
- Bachelor of Science in Chemical Engineering
- Bachelor of Science in Civil Engineering with subplans in Environmental Engineering, General Civil Engineering, Geospatial Engineering
- Bachelor of Science in Computer Engineering
- Bachelor of Science in Construction Engineering and Management
- Bachelor of Science in Electrical Engineering
- Bachelor of Science in Electromechanical Systems Engineering Technology
- Bachelor of Science in Electronic Systems Engineering Technology
- Bachelor of Science in Industrial Engineering
- Bachelor of Science in Manufacturing Engineering
- Bachelor of Science in Mechanical Engineering

College of Environmental Design (5)

- Bachelor of Architecture
- Bachelor of Arts in Art History
- Bachelor of Fine Arts in Visual Communication Design
- Bachelor of Science in Landscape Architecture
- Bachelor of Science in Urban & Regional Planning with subplans in Community Development and Social Justice, Infrastructure and Transportation, Resiliency Sustainability and the Environment, Urban Design

College of Letters, Arts, or Social Sciences (17)

- Bachelor of Arts in Criminology
- Bachelor of Arts in English with subplans in Applied Linguistics, English Education, Literary Studies
- Bachelor of Arts in Gender, Ethnicity, and Multicultural Studies with subplans in Gender, Ethnicity, and Multicultural Studies, Pre-Credential
- Bachelor of Arts in History with subplan in Pre-Credential
- Bachelor of Arts in Music with subplans in General, Music Industry Studies, Composition
- Bachelor of Arts in Philosophy with subplans in General, Law and Society
- Bachelor of Arts in Political Science
- Bachelor of Arts in Psychology
- Bachelor of Arts in Sociology with subplans in General Sociology, Social Work
- Bachelor of Arts in Spanish
- Bachelor of Arts in Theater with subplans in Acting, Dance Theatre, Design and Technical Production, General Theatre, Theatre in Education and Community Engagement
- Bachelor of Music in Music with subplans in Pedagogy (Pre-credential), Performance
- Bachelor of Science in Anthropology with subplans in Applied Anthropology, Archaeology, General Anthropology
- Bachelor of Science in Communication with subplans in Communication Studies, Multimedia Journalism, Public Relations
- Bachelor of Science in Economics with subplans in Applied Economics, General Economics, Quantitative Economics
- Bachelor of Science in Geography with subplans in Environmental Studies, Geospatial Analysis
- Bachelor of Science in Science, Technology, and Society

College of Science (9)

- Bachelor of Science in Biology
- Bachelor of Science in Biotechnology
- Bachelor of Science in Chemistry with subplans in American Chemical Society, Biochemistry, General Chemistry
- Bachelor of Science in Computer Science
- Bachelor of Science in Environmental Biology
- Bachelor of Science in Geology
- Bachelor of Science in Kinesiology with subplans in General, Physical Education Teacher Education
- Bachelor of Science in Mathematics with subplans in Applied Mathematics/Statistics, Secondary Teacher Preparation/Pure Mathematics
- Bachelor of Science in Physics with subplans in Biophysics, General, Integrated Science

The Collins College of Hospitality Management (1)

- Bachelor of Science in Hospitality Management

List of master degrees offered at Cal Poly Pomona (37)

College of Agriculture (2)

- Master of Science in Agriculture with subplans in Agricultural Science, Animal Science, Nutrition and Food Science, Plant Science
- Master of Science in Dietetics

College of Business Administration (9)

- Master of Business Administration
- Master of Science in Accountancy
- Master of Science in Accountancy (Accelerated)
- Master of Science in Business Analytics
- Master of Science in Digital Marketing
- Master of Science in Digital Supply Chain Management
- Master of Science in Financial Analytics
- Master of Science in Human Resources Leadership
- Master of Science in Information Security

College of Education and Integrative Studies (1)

- Master of Arts in Education with subplans in Curriculum and Instruction, Educational Leadership, Special Education

College of Engineering (7)

- Master of Science in Aerospace Engineering
- Master of Science in Civil Engineering with subplans in Construction Engineering, Environmental and Water Resources Engineering, Geotechnical Engineering Structural Engineering, Transportation Engineering
- Master of Science in Electrical Engineering
- Master of Science in Engineering Management
- Master of Science in Materials Engineering
- Master of Science in Mechanical Engineering
- Master of Science in Systems Engineering

College of Environmental Design (5)

- Master of Architecture
- Master of Interior Architecture
- Master of Landscape Architecture
- Master of Science in Regenerative Studies
- Master of Urban and Regional Planning

College of Letters, Arts, or Social Sciences (5)

- Master of Arts in English with subplans in Literary Studies, Rhetoric and Composition, Teaching English to Speakers of Other Languages
- Bachelor of Arts in History
- Master of Public Administration
- Master of Science in Economics
- Master of Science in Physics

College of Science (7)

- Master of Science in Biological Sciences
- Master of Science in Chemistry
- Master of Science in Computer Science
- Master of Science in Geology
- Master of Science in Kinesiology
- Master of Science in Mathematics
- Bachelor of Science in Statistics and Applied Mathematics with subplans in Applied Mathematics, Statistics

The Collins College of Hospitality Management (1)

- Master of Science in Hospitality Management

== Rankings ==
=== Agriculture ===
According to the magazine Diverse Issues in Higher Education, Cal Poly Pomona is ranked 15th in the nation in awarding master's degrees to minorities in Agriculture, Agricultural Operations and Related Sciences among both private and public universities (as of June, 2008).

=== Business Administration ===
The Princeton Review lists Cal Poly Pomona's college of business administration among the best in the country for both private and public universities on its “Best 296 Business Schools” publication. In addition, Diverse Issues in Higher Education places Cal Poly Pomona 6th in the nation in awarding bachelor's degrees to minorities in Business, Management, Marketing and Related Fields.

=== Engineering ===
Cal Poly Pomona is ranked and tied for 11th overall for top undergraduate engineering programs in the Regional University (Where the highest degree offered is Master's) category in the country according to U.S. News & World Report. Cal Poly Pomona's civil engineering program is ranked 7th overall in the nation among top undergraduate programs, 10th for electrical engineering, and 8th for mechanical engineering. In addition, the college of engineering places 8th in the nation for top 10 Automotive Colleges and Universities in the U.S., according to automotive information provider Edmunds.com.

Cal Poly Pomona's college of engineering also places 5th in the nation in awarding bachelor's degrees to minorities in engineering amongst all private and public schools, and 34th for awarding master's to Hispanic students according to Diverse Issues in Higher Education.

=== Environmental Design ===
According to Planetizen, Cal Poly Pomona's Urban and Regional Planning Programs ranks 2nd in the nation for non-Ph.D. programs, as the university's highest offered degrees are master's. For Best Urban and Regional Planning Programs with a Ph.D., Cal Poly Pomona ranks 7th amongst all public and private universities in the West Region. Planetizen also ranks Cal Poly Pomona 21st in the nation for Best Urban & Regional Planning graduate programs.

The architecture magazine, called Design Intelligence, ranks Cal Poly Pomona 10th in the nation for Best Undergraduate Landscape Architecture program and 15th for Best Graduate Landscape Architecture program . Design Intelligence gives "High Distinction" to Cal Poly Pomona's Landscape Architecture Program. Design Intelligence considers Cal Poly Pomona's Architecture Program as "one of the best in the world." The architecture program is ranked 16th among all research and Ph. D Universities in the country.
