= Michael Ortiz =

Michael Ortiz may refer to:

- J. Michael Ortiz, American educator and president of Cal Poly Pomona
- Michael Ortiz (mathematician) (born 1954), American scientist and researcher
- Shooting of Michael Ortiz
