= 58th Technology and Engineering Emmy Awards =

2007 awards ceremony

- Date: January 8, 2007
- Location: Venetian Hotel; Las Vegas
- Website: http://www.emmyonline.org/tech/

The 58th Technology and Engineering Emmy Awards was held on January 8, 2007. The National Television Academy announced the winners at The Venetian Hotel in Las Vegas. DIRECTV's Eddy Hartenstein received the Lifetime Achievement Award for his role in the company's becoming a global provider of digital television.

== Awardees ==
- For pioneering development of On-Screen Display for setup, control and configuration of consumer television equipment:
  - RCA-TTE
- For streaming media architectures and components:
  - Microsoft
  - Adobe Systems Inc.
  - RealNetworks
  - Apple
- For pioneering development for combining multiple transport streams, which are already encoded, using rate-shaping and statistical remultiplexing:
  - Terayon Communication Systems, Inc.
- For development and implementation of automatically assembled dynamic customized TV advertising:
  - Visible World
  - The Weather Channel
- For technology advances in serial digital interface solutions, enabling over 20 years of seamless studio and broadcast infrastructure migration:
  - Gennum Corporation
- For privately owned and operated international satellite company primarily for international video services:

• Rene Anselmo, PanAmSat

== Science, engineering & technology awards for digital television ==
The National Television Academy also announced Emmy winners in seven Science, Technology & Engineering for Digital Television categories. The seven categories included nominations in the areas of interactive television, On Demand television, the Internet, and personal media display and presentation technology.

- For advanced media technology for the synchronous enhancement of original television content:
  - DirecTV Interactive Sports – DirecTV
- For advanced media technology for the non-synchronous enhancement of original television content:
  - The-N.com Video Mixer – The N
- For advanced media technology for the creation of non-traditional programs or platforms:
  - The Slingbox – Sling Media
- For advanced media technology for the best use of personal media display and presentation technology:
  - Xross Media Bar – Sony Computer Entertainment
- For advanced media technology for the best use of "On Demand" technology over private (closed) networks
  - Time Warner Cable's Start Over – Time Warner Cable, Concurrent Computer Corp., Big Band Networks, Harmonic Inc., Scientific Atlanta.
- For advanced media technology for the best use of "On Demand" technology over the public (open) internet
  - Stim TV – NPOWR
- For advanced media technology for best use by commercials in creation and use in non-traditional platforms and technologies:
  - TiVo Interactive Advertising Platform – TiVo Inc.
- For peripheral development and technological impact of video game controllers:
  - Nintendo
  - Sony Computer Entertainment America, for the dual shock analog controller.
- For development of 3D software engines:
  - John Carmack
  - id Software
- For pioneering work in near and real-time fully programmable shading via modern graphics processors:
  - Microsoft
  - AMD
  - NVIDIA Corporation
