= Elaine Kim (fashion designer) =

American fashion designer (born 1962)

- Born: 1962 (age 63–64); Seoul, South Korea
- Occupation: Fashion designer
- Known for: Clothing, Footwear, Handbags, Accessories
- Label: Elaine Kim LLC
- Website: www.ElaineKim.com

Elaine Kim (born 1962) is an American fashion designer.

== Early life ==
Kim was born in Seoul, South Korea in 1962 and was raised in San Francisco and Los Angeles.

== "Ecru" ==
In 1986, Kim opened and operated the boutiques, Ecru, along with her partner Ken Fasola, the original owner of the store, first on Melrose Avenue and then in Marina del Rey in Los Angeles. Ecru offered collections from European designers such as John Galliano, Dolce & Gabbana, CoSTUME NATIONAL, and Ann Demeulemeester. The modern exterior and interior of the store was designed by architects Michele Saee and Richard Lundquist under the direction of Ken Fasola and received numerous architectural accreditations and was a prominent fashion store that helped establish Melrose Avenue as a trendy, fashion-forward destination.

== "Product" ==
In 1992, Kim created a women's wear label called Product. The line, consisting of essentials such as jersey slip dresses and stretch pants, was sold at Barneys New York and her own store Product on Robertson Blvd in Los Angeles, and was worn by Madonna and Kate Moss. A diffusion line called By-Product was launched in 1994. By 1998, Product operated three flagship stores on both coasts. The label was sold in 2000 to Australian investors.

== "Product" stores ==
Kim opened the first "Product" store on Beverly Boulevard in Los Angeles in 1991. After moving operations to New York, she opened a flagship store on Mercer Street in the SoHo neighborhood in New York City in 1996, with subsequent stores in the NoLita neighborhood on Mott Street and then on Robertson Boulevard in Beverly Hills.

== Designer label ==
Kim launched her eponymous designer label in March 2008, which was featured on the Wednesday July 23, 2008 cover of Women's Wear Daily. "The former designer for Product is re-entering the market after an eight-year absence with a smart, streamlined collection."
