= List of Cal Poly alumni =

List of Cal Poly alumni may refer to:

- List of Cal Poly Pomona alumni
- List of Cal Poly at San Luis Obispo alumni
