= Eduardo M. Ochoa =

Argentinean-American economist, academic administrator

Eduardo Ochoa
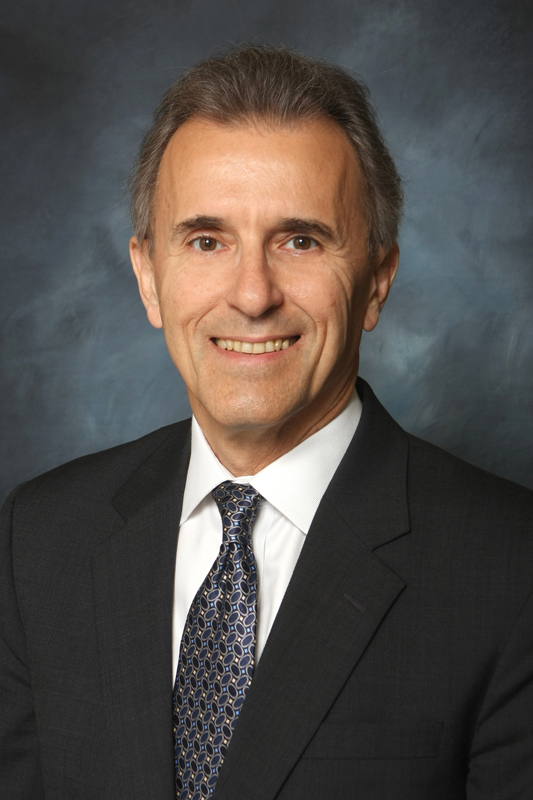
- Ochoa in 2016

4th President of California State University, Monterey Bay
- In office July 2012 – July 2022
- Preceded by: Dianne F. Harrison
- Succeeded by: Vanya Quiñones

Assistant Secretary of Education for Postsecondary Education
- In office 2010–2012
- President: Barack Obama

Personal details
- Born: Buenos Aires, Argentina
- Education: Reed College (BS); Columbia University (MS); The New School (PhD)

Eduardo M. Ochoa is an Argentinean-American economist and academic administrator who served as the president of California State University, Monterey Bay, from 2012 to 2022. Ochoa was the assistant secretary of education for postsecondary education during the Obama administration from 2010 to 2012.

== Early life and education ==
Ochoa was born and raised in Buenos Aires. His family moved to Portland, Oregon, while he was in high school. He graduated from Reed College with a bachelor's degree in physics. Ochoa earned a Master of Science in nuclear science from Columbia University. He completed a Doctor of Philosophy in economics at The New School.

== Career ==
Ochoa taught at California State University, Fresno, and California State University, Los Angeles, as a full professor and chair of the economics and statistics department. He was the acting dean of the School of Business and Economics. In 1997, Ochoa began a six-year period as the dean of the Cal Poly Pomona College of Business Administration. He was later the provost and vice president for academic affairs at Sonoma State University for seven years. From 2010 to 2012, he served as the U.S. assistant secretary for postsecondary education in the Obama administration. In 2012, he became the president of California State University, Monterey Bay.

== Personal life ==
Ochoa is married and has two sons.
