= Ferry Building =

Ferry Building may refer to:

- Auckland Ferry Building, New Zealand
- San Francisco Ferry Building, California, United States
- San Pedro Municipal Ferry Building, California, United States
