= Soraya M. Coley =

American academic administrator

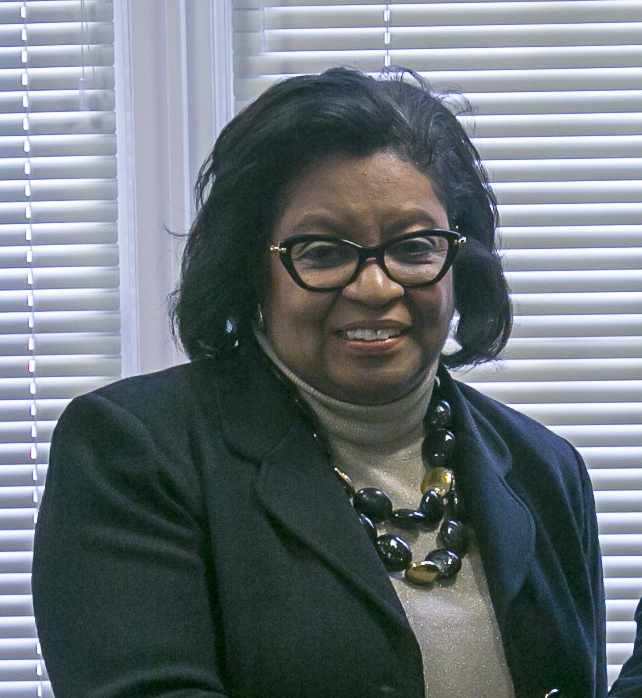
- Coley in 2018

6th President of California State Polytechnic University, Pomona
- In office January, 2015 – July 28, 2025
- Preceded by: J. Michael Ortiz
- Succeeded by: Vanya Quiñones

Personal details
- Born: November 25, 1950 (age 75) Wilmington, North Carolina, U.S.
- Education: Lincoln University (BA); Bryn Mawr College (MA, PhD)

Soraya M. Coley (born November 25, 1950) is an American academic and university administrator who served as the sixth president of California State Polytechnic University, Pomona (Cal Poly Pomona). With four decades of experience in higher education, Coley is the first woman and first African American scholar to be named president of Cal Poly Pomona.

As president, Coley lead an institution with nearly 30,000 students and nearly 2,700 faculty and staff.

Coley joined Cal Poly Pomona from California State University, Bakersfield, where she was the provost and vice president for academic affairs from 2005 to 2014. In addition, she served as interim vice president for university advancement from 2011 to 2012. She has also held positions at California State University, Fullerton, the National Center for Substance Abuse and Child Welfare, and Alliant International University.

In 2019, California Governor Gavin Newsom appointed Coley to the California Future of Work Commission, which was charged with making recommendations to the Governor and Legislature regarding the impact of technology, methods of promoting better job quality, modernizing worker safety net protections, and readying the state's workforce for the jobs of the future.

Coley is a member of the American Council on Education Women’s Network and presidential sponsor of its Southern California chapter. In 2023, Coley received the American Council on Education Donna Shavlik Award, which honors an individual who demonstrates a sustained commitment to advancing women in higher education through leadership, career development and mentoring. She is a former member of the board of directors for Children and Family Futures as well as the Kern County Schools’ “Ready to Start” program. In 2000, she was recognized as “One of Ten Women Making a Difference” by Orange County Metro Magazine.

Coley earned a bachelor's degree in sociology from Lincoln University in Pennsylvania. She completed her master's and doctoral degrees in social planning and social research from Bryn Mawr College where she was recognized as a distinguished alumna.

She is married to Ron Coley, who served two decades of active duty as a pilot in the Marine Corps, retiring at the rank of Lieutenant Colonel. After his military service, Mr. Coley begun a career in public service and higher education administration, including six years as a Senior County Administrator in Orange County, California, and multiple senior positions at the University of California.

In 2022, a whistleblower lawsuit alleged that Coley interfered with police work and the legal process multiple times on the Cal Poly Pomona campus. Among the most notable of these alleged occurrences were a series of blockages that slowed investigation into an embezzlement of over a million dollars and the premature closure of a 2021 sexual assault case. During a 2023 meeting of the university’s academic senate, members passed a vote of no confidence in University President Soraya M. Coley and urged California State University Chancellor Mildred García to launch a formal investigation into her actions.

In February 2025, Coley announced her decision to retire from the CSU at the end of July 2025.

Academic offices
Preceded by J. Michael Ortiz	6th President of Cal Poly Pomona; 2015 – 2026	Succeeded by Vanya Quiñones
