= James Pulliam (architect) =

American architect (1925–2005)

- Born: January 31, 1925; Lyons, Kansas
- Died: December 27, 2005 (aged 80); La Cañada Flintridge, California
- Education: Dartmouth College
- Occupation: Architect
- Buildings: All-State Savings and Loans (Glendale, CA), Bronco Student Center Building at Cal Poly Pomona, Interior remodeling for Los Angeles Maritime Museum

James Pulliam (1925−2005) was a noted Modernist architect in the Greater Los Angeles Area of Southern California.

== Works ==
Pulliam was known for a "cut into box" style exhibited by the All-State Savings and Loan building in Glendale, California, and original Bronco Student Union Building at Cal Poly Pomona in 1976, and the interior remodeling of the San Pedro Municipal Ferry Building to house the Los Angeles Maritime Museum. Noted architectural historian David Gebhard cited a house he designed in Beverly Hills as "monumental," and the Bronco Student Center at Cal Poly Pomona as the best building on campus.

He worked in the offices of Richard Neutra and Welton Beckett. He was later a partner in the architectural firm Pulliam Zimmerman Matthews. As president of the Los Angeles chapter of the AIA, he advocated for preserving the integrity of the Los Angeles Central Library.

He served as the campus architect at Cal Poly Pomona where he also served as an instructor at the College of Environmental Design.

== Death ==
James Pulliam died in 2005, at his home in La Cañada Flintridge, California.

In his obituary, the Los Angeles Times said:

"Jim Pulliam, FAIA was a gentleman Los Angeles modernist architect, known for his highly detailed custom modernist residential and commercial commissions. Jim's mid career works were celebrated in a major Los Angeles area architectural exhibit identified as The Los Angeles 12 Architects, of which Jim Pulliam was one of the distinguished twelve architects. Pulliam's works were included in the Los Angeles Twelve Architects exhibit and conferences at the Pacific Design Center, Los Angeles; Cal Poly Pomona Bookstore and Student Center Building (which he designed) and the Aspen Design Conference, Aspen Co.."
