= Bronco Student Center =

Coordinates: 34.056589°N 117.821544°W

- Bronco Student Center
- Interactive map of the Bronco Student Center area

General information
- Type: Student union
- Location: Pomona, California, United States
- Construction started: May, 2000
- Completed: April, 2003
- Inaugurated: October, 2003
- Cost: $18.3 million USD
- Client: California State Polytechnic University, Pomona (Cal Poly Pomona)
- Owner: Cal Poly Pomona Associated Students

Technical details
- Floor count: 2
- Floor area: 56,700 square feet

The Bronco Student Center is a student activity center for meetings, conferences, meals, recreation, and shopping for students and alumni on the campus of Cal Poly Pomona in Pomona, California. The building serves as the headquarters for the Cal Poly Pomona Associated Students, Inc. (ASI) student government. It houses the offices of the ASI Board of Directors and various other student-run departments, facilitating a range of governance and administrative functions essential to student life and activities. The original building was built in 1976 and was designed by architecture instructor James Pulliam.

== Food services ==
In addition to the Campus Center Marketplace the student center offers a variety of dining options.

- Hibachi San
- Peet's Coffee & Tea
- Round Table Pizza
- Subway
- Qdoba
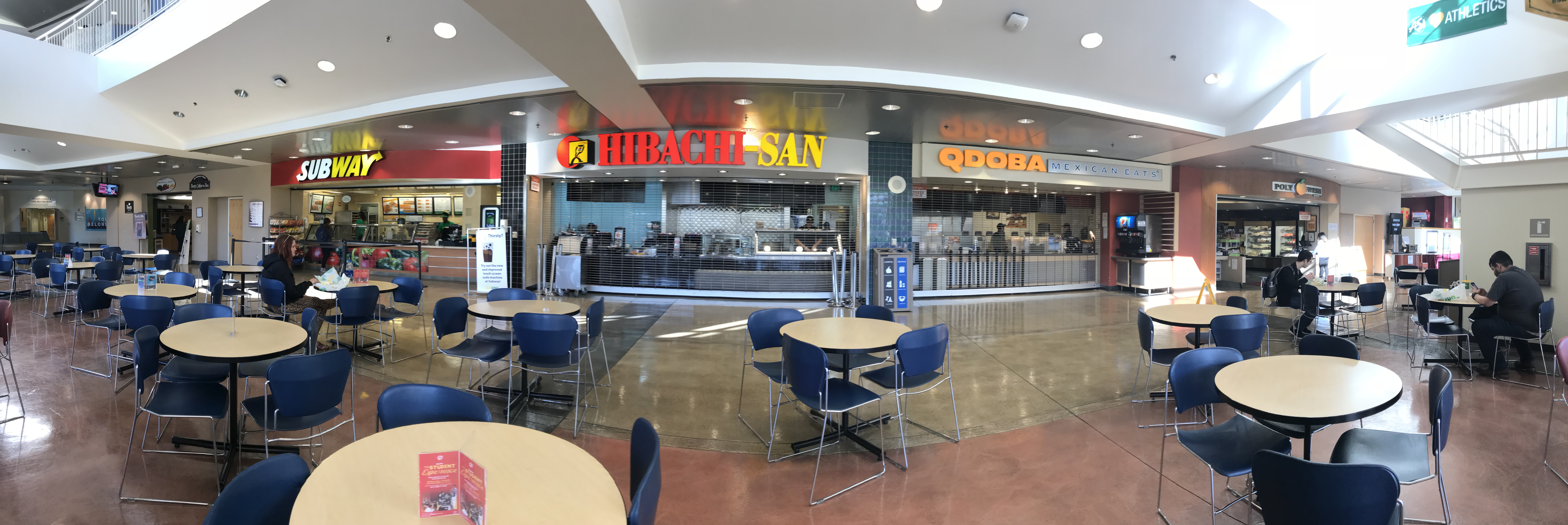
Bronco Student Center Food Court offers students a variety of food options such as Pete's Coffee/ Smoothies, Subway, Hibachi San, Qdoba, Poly Fresh, and Round Table Pizza (Not Pictured).

== Other services ==
- Copy and Mail
