= Japanese Friendship Garden (Balboa Park) =

Japanese Garden located in Balboa Park, San Diego, CA

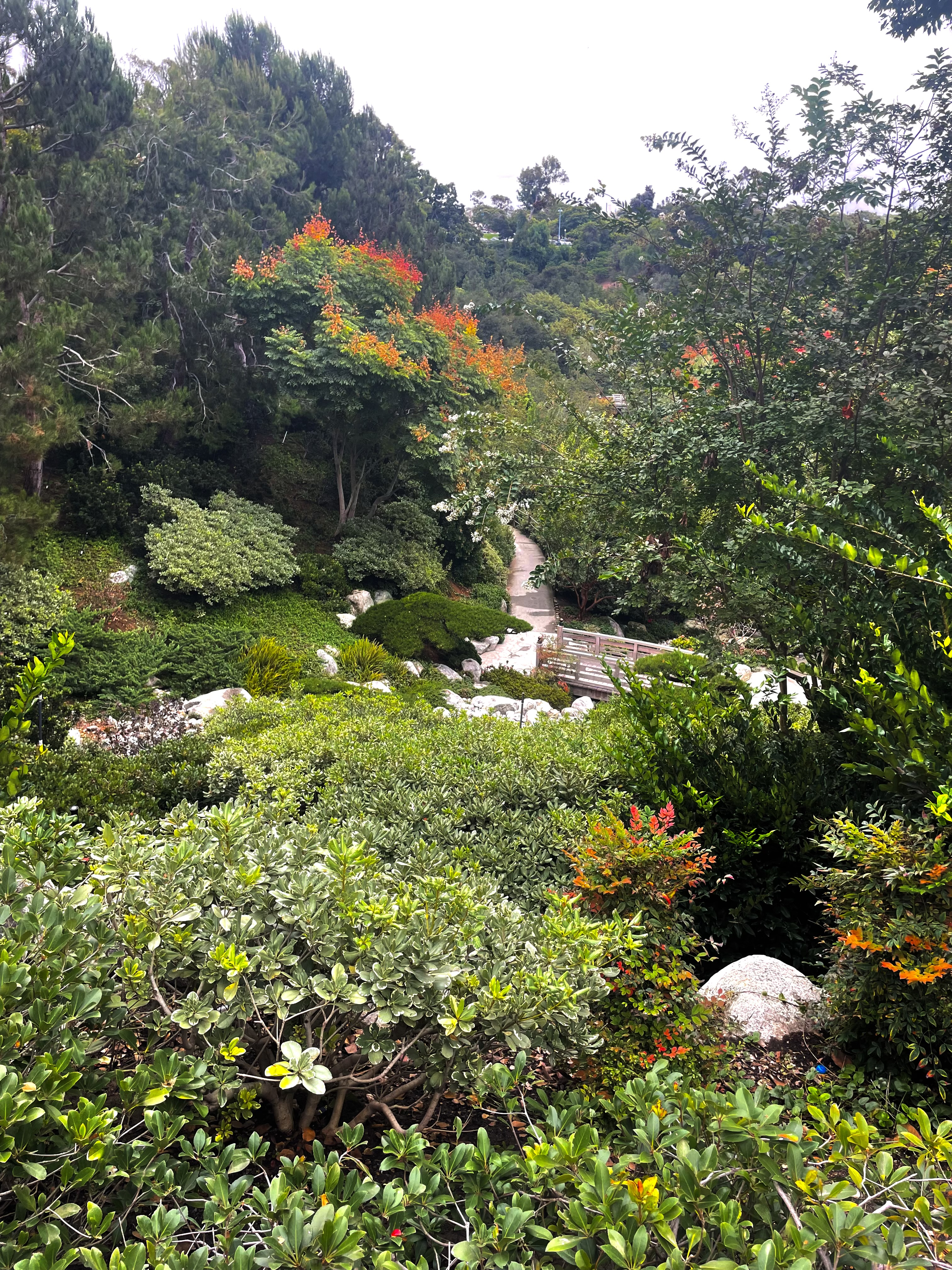
- Overlooking view of the Japanese Friendship Garden at Balboa Park, 2024

- Location within Balboa Park, San Diego Japanese Friendship Garden (California) Japanese Friendship Garden (the United States)
- Former name: Japanese Tea Pavilion
- Established: August 1990
- Location: Balboa Park, San Diego, California, U.S.
- Coordinates: 32°43′47″N 117°08′58″W
- Type: Japanese garden
- Key holdings: Koi ponds; Bonsai garden; Cherry trees; Tea Pavilion
- Collections: Japanese horticulture and cultural exhibits
- Founder: San Diego–Yokohama Sister City Society
- Architect: Takeo Uesugi
- Owner: City of San Diego
- Public transit access: Accessible via Balboa Park tram and bus routes
- Parking: Available at Balboa Park lots
- Website: www.niwa.org; balboapark.org/arts-culture/japanese-friendship-garden-and-museum-balboa-park/

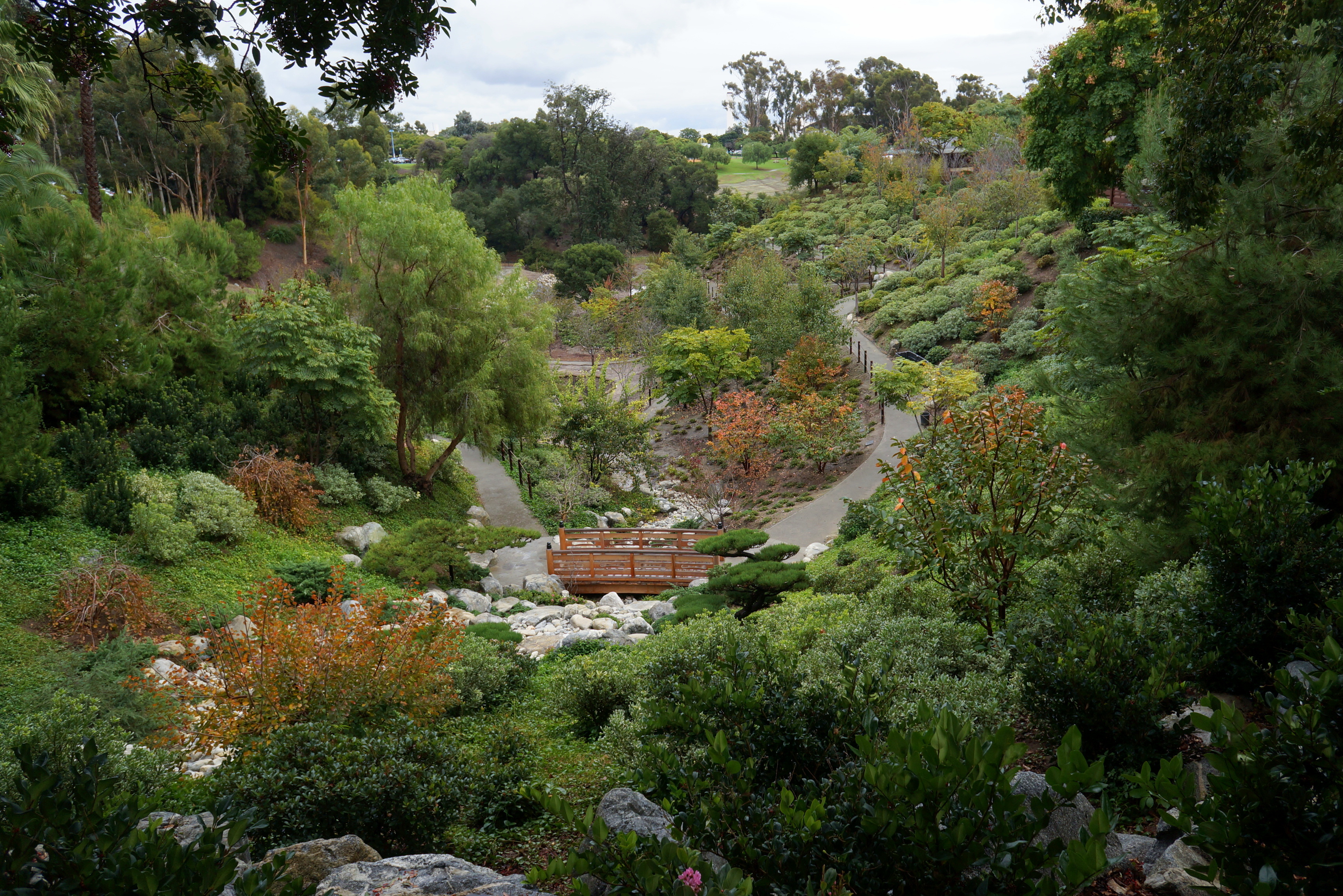
Footbridge on path through lower garden.

The Japanese Friendship Garden and Museum is a Japanese garden in Balboa Park in San Diego, California. It is an expression of friendship between San Diego and its sister city Yokohama.

== Events ==
The Japanese Friendship Garden also holds an annual Cherry Blossom Festival. During the festival, visitors encounter Japanese tradition of flower viewing or hanami including other traditional practices in the Japanese culture. This includes Japanese street food, performances from traditional dancers and Japanese drum or taiko troupes, and more. In 2023, the Cherry Blossom festival had “performances by the San Diego Japanese Hula Club, the Buddhist Temple of San Diego’s Ondo Dancers as well as taiko—a Japanese drum—troupes.”

== History ==
=== Japanese Tea Pavilion (1914–1941) ===
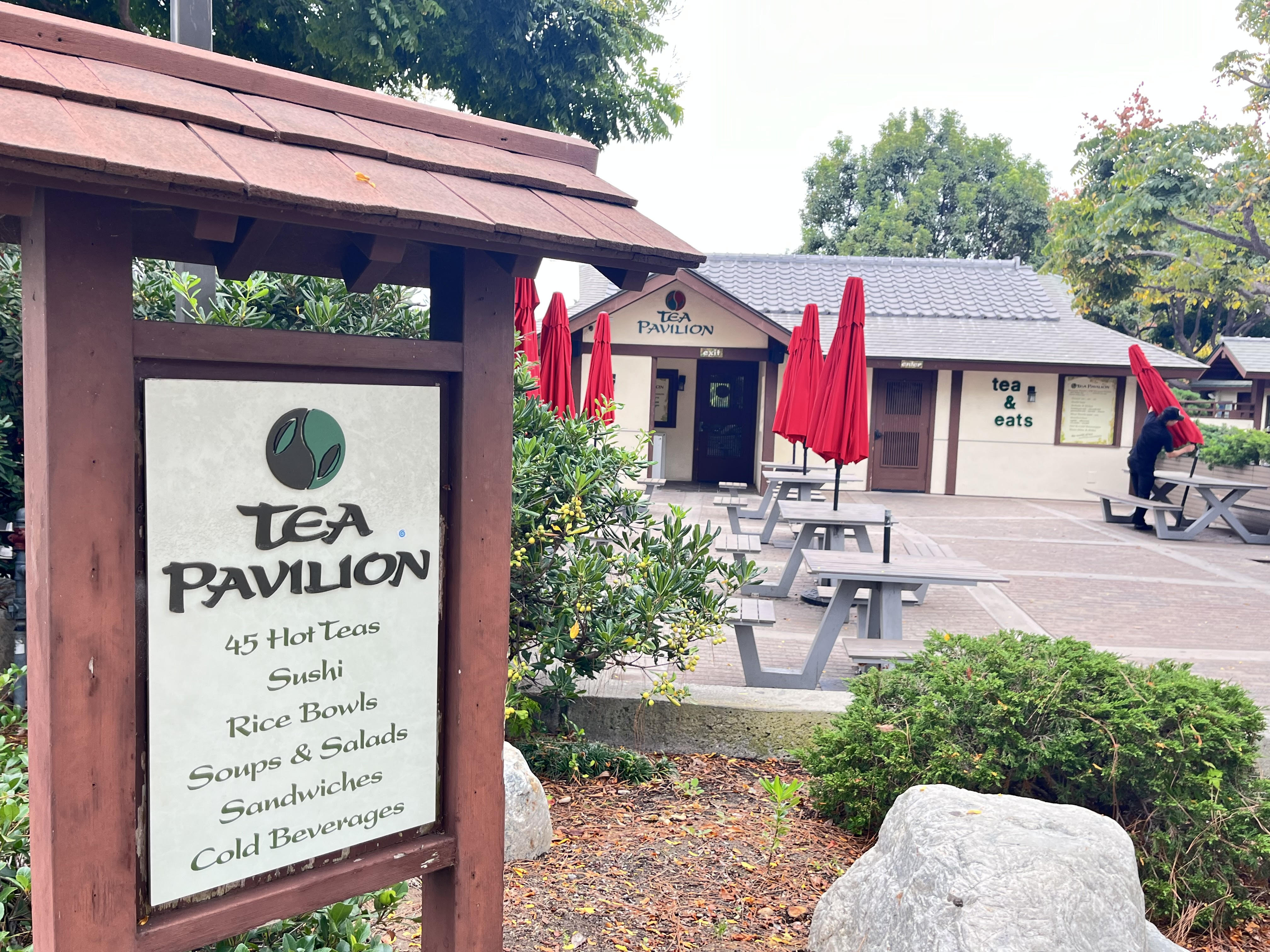
Sign of Tea Pavilion in front of the main building.

San Diego opened its Panama–California Exposition in Balboa Park in 1915. Designed to call attention to San Diego and bolster the economy, the Exposition highlighted archaeological and anthropological displays as well as advertised the agricultural potential of the southwest. One of the popular exhibits was a Japanese Teahouse built just north of the Botanical Building in an area that is now occupied by the Children's Zoo. The Teahouse was a one-story building with an open veranda where visitors to the Exposition could sit, sip tea, and enjoy a garden landscaped in a manner few had seen other than from photos of Japan.

There was a Japanese Garden adjacent to the Teahouse which included plants, stone lanterns, bronze cranes, and a winding stream. While the garden lacked a sense of depth or borrowing of scenery ("shakkei"), details were carefully executed by the gardeners who were well versed in the techniques of bonsai and ikebana. The overall harmony of elements was sacrificed as effects were compressed for space. In Japan there are often fences or walls surrounding the garden, but in Balboa Park at that time, there was neither fence nor wall to help create and define areas or moods.

For nearly thirty years, the Teahouse and garden were operated and maintained by the Asakawa family, who continue to this day as active members of the San Diego community. Though a symbol of the strong cultural and commercial ties that linked the two nations, the Teahouse and garden were eventually closed.

After the world exposition, the city was not going to pay to upkeep and maintain the garden so they looked for a Japanese couple to run the tea house. Some of my earliest memories was painting the bridges every three years with red paint; taking down the shoji screens and replacing them with rice paper around the garden was also a chore. Of my fondest memories of the tea house was one of peace; nice and quiet, surrounded by lush trees. I enjoyed living there growing up as the eldest child of three. My parents used to harvest bamboo shoots when they grew to be about twelve inches tall and prepared them for food. The living quarters consisted of two bedrooms and one bathroom, an attic upstairs.

The tea house was opened to the public. The customers of the Japanese Tea House enjoyed their tea, sandwiches (ham and chicken salad) and noodles around porch that surrounded the tea house. Inside, you would find tatami mats, traditional flooring of Japan made of bamboo. Visitors could also find one of a kind gifts that his parents imported from Japan. I believed that my mother was accredited to being the first to incorporate green tea powder with ice cream! More of my recollections were of the koi pond. It contained 50-100 koi and the famous wisteria arbors. I remember a professional Japanese photographer asking my mother to pose for him in front of the wisteria, the photo is now known as the wisteria photo. After the photographer returned back to his homeland, he blossomed into a very prominent photographer.

From 1914 through 1941, the Japanese Tea Garden remained the same until it was dismantled.

— Moto Asakawa

=== Garden Restoration (1955–1990) ===
In 1955, key citizens of San Diego gathered, and formulated a plan for restoring a Japanese garden in Balboa Park on an expanded site. As the first tangible symbol of this effort, the City of Yokohama presented the City of San Diego with a snow lantern in 1956. Following that in 1958, they presented the Friendship Bell, which can now be found on Shelter Island.

The San Diego Yokohama Sister City Society, whose members worked with the City of San Diego to identify the current site of the garden, acquired a Japanese Gate. They installed it just to the north of the Organ Pavilion. In. 1968, they dedicated the gate as the Charles C. Dail Memorial Japanese Gate in order to honor the commitment by the people of San Diego. The gate was near the entrance to the 11 acres (4.5 ha) set aside in Balboa Park, the eventual construction and restoration site of a Japanese garden.

In 1977, after hearing the plans by many San Diegans to reestablish a Japanese garden, Yokohama gave San Diego 100 cherry blossom trees that now blossom at the Wild Animal Park. During 1977 and 1978, a series of public conferences were held to make plans for the new garden. These events allowed the general public to get involved in the designing of Balboa's new garden.

Entrance

The next step was to design a master plan. For this task, the society called upon the architectural firm of Fong & LaRocca Associates. Takeo Uesugi, the Landscape Architect and Japanese Garden Design Consultant, was to help them in planning and designing the garden. In 1979 the Department of Parks & Recreation and the City Council's Public Facilities & Recreation Committee approved the Japanese Garden Master Plan for Balboa Park. The society had a professional feasibility study completed to determine if sufficient financial support was available. Not only did funds have to be identified from San Diego, but also from a sources throughout the United States and Japan. The study showed that support for the project was strong, so with the cooperation of Mayor Pete Wilson and the City of San Diego, the new Japanese Friendship Garden was under way.

In 1985, Landscape Architect Takeshi Ken Nakajima named the garden San-Kei-En, which means garden of three types of scenery—pastoral, mountain, and lake.

The initial Master Plan was designed so that garden could be constructed in five phases, with the first opening in August 1990. While planning for the second phase, the Master Plan was changed and the phase system was discontinued.

=== Garden Improvement Project (1990–1999) ===
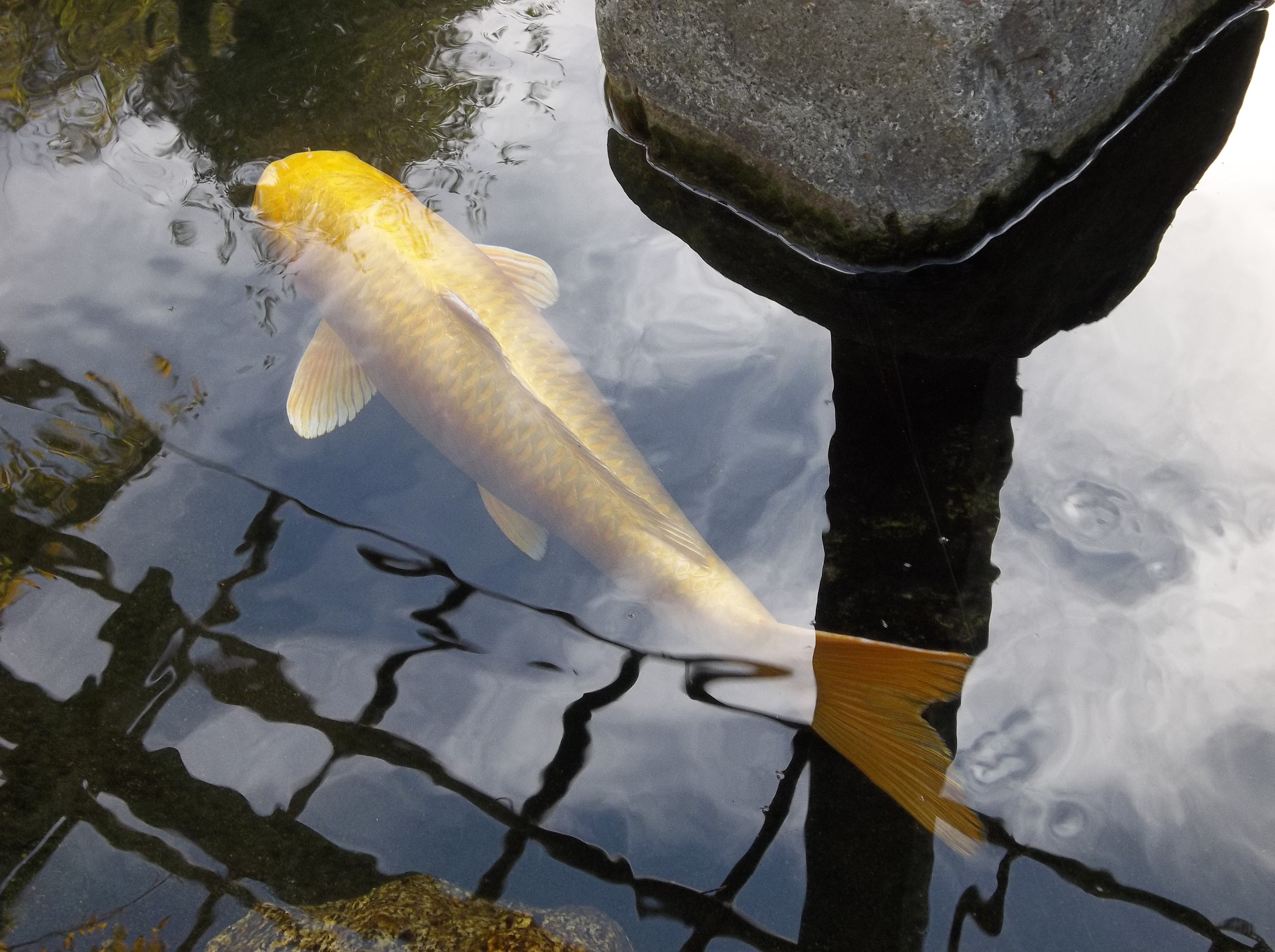
Yamabuki Ogon koi and reflections in pond.

In September 1999, the second major improvement project for the garden was carried out and completed. The design team for this project was led by landscape architect Professor Takeo Uesugi.

The Improvement Project included:

- The addition of a plaza at the upper entrance of the garden including a Tea Pavilion.
- The creation of a Garden Study Center to focus on the skill and techniques of Japanese gardening.
- The creation of an Exhibit Hall and Activity Center to focus on Japanese cultural plans showcased in the garden.
- An expansion and a variety of enhancements relating to the entire upper garden.
- The addition of a much larger garden maintenance workforce and staff.
- The creation of a 10,700-gallon koi pond and adjacent waterfall.
- The addition of a new Bonsai Garden.
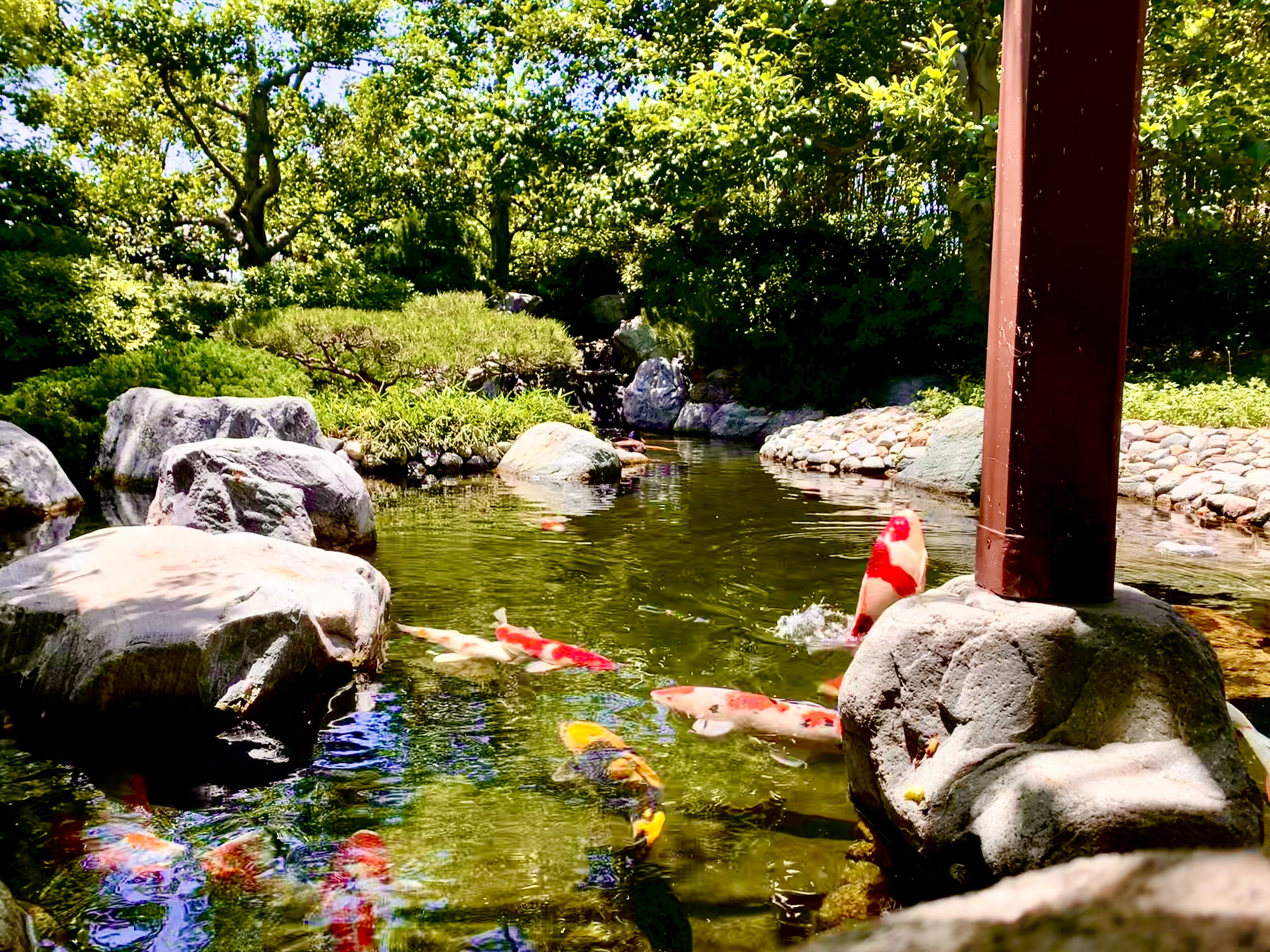
  Koi Pond, 2024

The improvement project took two years of planning, but many of the design elements planned were ultimately built incorporated into the final plan. The Japanese Friendship Garden was closed to the public for approximately six months and re-opened September 21, 1999.

=== Garden Improvement Project Third Phase ===
In 2015, the Japanese Friendship Garden celebrated its centennial with a nine-acre expansion project, totalling the garden to 11 acres. The expansion was funded with support from members and a $3 million commitment from Dr. Kazuo Inamori, where they "began in early 2010 with creation of the dry waterfall, a connecting water feature, the dragon bridge, cherry tree grove, camellia and azalea garden, nursery, and a tea and herb garden.” Additionally, the expansion allowed for more cultural events, programming, and community partnerships, such as the Cherry Blossom Festival, Summer Camp program, and an Obon Festival. The garden also planned year-long exhibitions highlighting the history of Japanese entities in the park, including a documentary featuring oral histories and a showcase of Japanese artists in porcelain and basketry. This expansion was predicted to double the amount of annual visitors from the previous 100,000 and it is anticipated for the numbers to continue to climb.

== Bonsai theft ==
On February 24, 2023, two masked individuals broke into the Japanese Friendship Garden and stole a bonsai tree valued at around $500. A similar theft had occurred 9 years prior, but it is not known if the incidents are related.
