= Carl Maston =

American architect

Carl L. Maston
- Born: June 17, 1915; Jacksonville, IL
- Died: May 31, 1992 (aged 76); Hollywood, CA
- Occupation: Architect
- Awards: USC Distinguished Alumni Award (1989)
- Buildings: Maston Residence; Hillside House; Cal Poly Pomona College of Environmental Design; Chiat House; Thies Residence

Carl L. Maston (born Carl Mastopietro, June 17, 1915 – May 31, 1992) was an American architect known for his mid-century modern architecture.

== Biography ==
Maston was born to an Italian father and English mother. Ultimately choosing the architectural profession over a career in music, Maston designed more than 100 buildings, including private residences, apartment buildings, shopping centers and large-scale institutional projects. Upon graduating from the University of Southern California he worked for the offices of Floyd Rible, A. Quincy Jones, Fred Emmons, Phil Daniel, and Allied Architects. After serving in World War II, Maston returned to Los Angeles and opened his first office in Beverly Hills. In 1946, he was commissioned to build the Pandora Apartments, marking the beginning of his experimentation with garden apartment design. In 1954, Maston completed his portion of the quintessential California apartment complex, the National Boulevard Apartments (Maston designed one building, architect Ray Kappe the other). In 1960, he designed the now demolished Valley Ice Skating Center which featured a barrel vaulted tensile concrete roof. Among his most noted accomplishments are the Cal Poly Pomona College of Environmental Design, and the Creative Arts Building at the California State University, San Bernardino.

In the 1980s he married Edith Carissimi, who for four decades, ran Musso & Frank Grill, Hollywood's oldest restaurant and celebrity haunt.

== Works ==
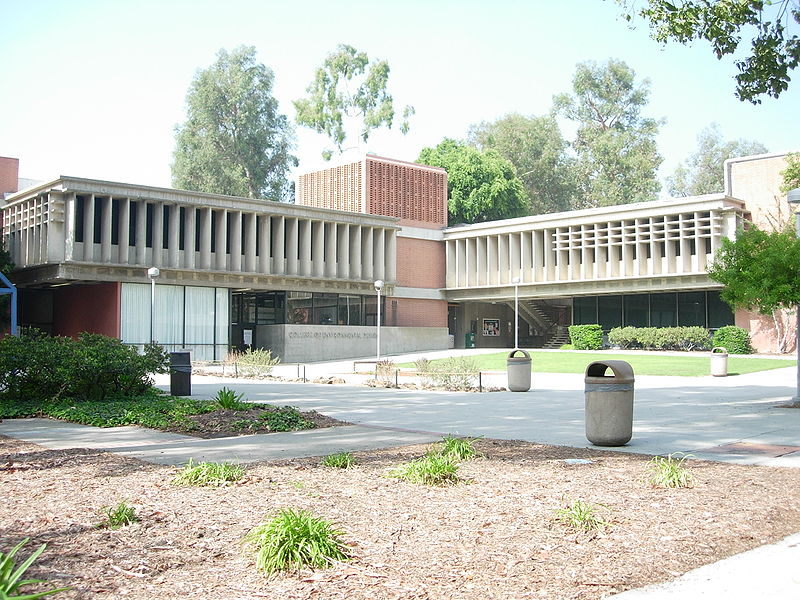
Cal Poly Pomona Building 7

Of his residential work, the Thies Residence, the Hillside House, and the Maston Residence have been recently renovated by Glee creator Ryan Murphy and published. The Cal Poly Pomona College of Environmental Design still stands in almost original condition. The only modification being a seismic retrofit which added several exposed concrete ties around the brick portions of the building. The Los Angeles Conservancy noted "With its exposed concrete, brick, and glass, Maston's design expresses itself in a functional yet aesthetically pleasing place for students to practice their craft."
