= Los Angeles Maritime Museum =

Nautical exhibits at San Pedro's Municipal Ferry Terminal building

Coordinates: 33.7387°N 118.2787°W

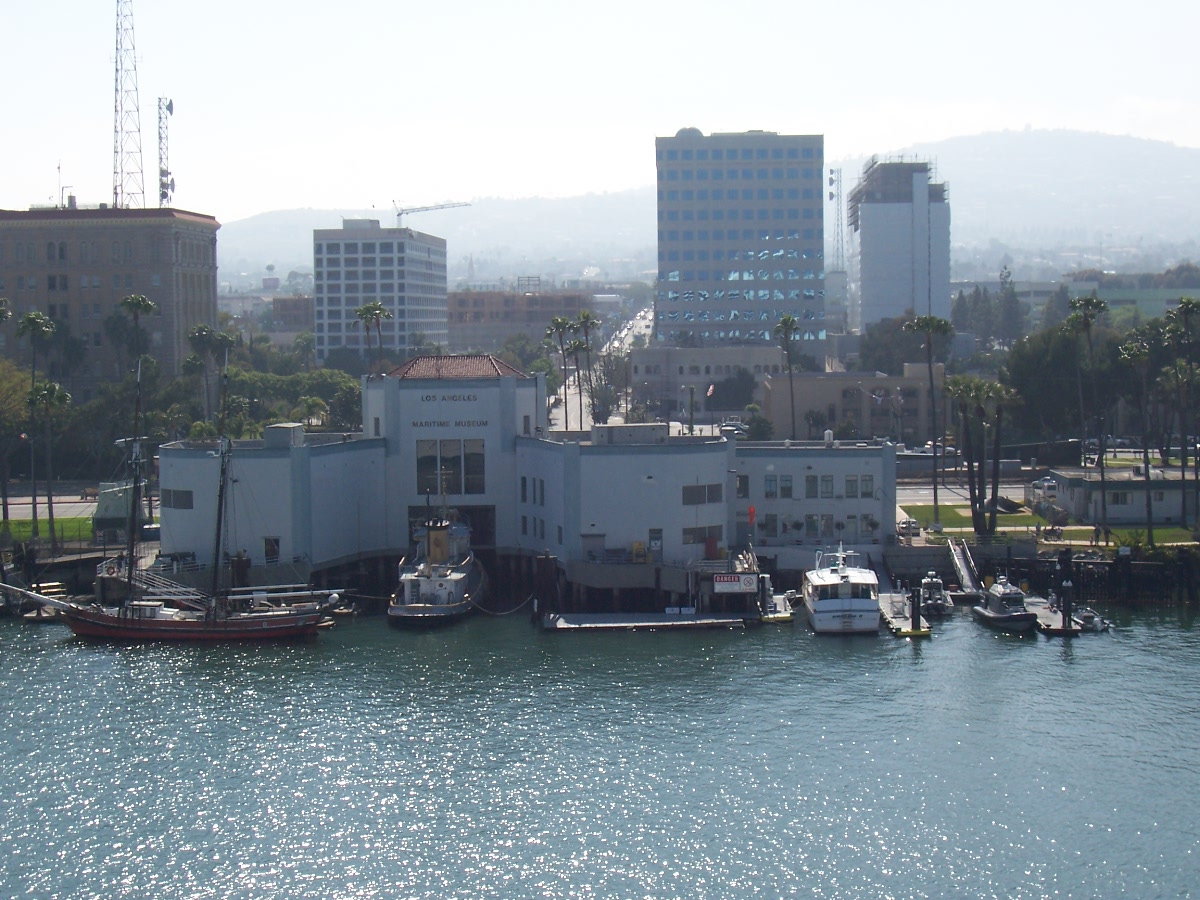
Los Angeles Maritime Museum seen from the Los Angeles Harbor main channel.

The Los Angeles Maritime Museum is a non-profit maritime museum, located at Sixth Street at Harbor Boulevard in the community of San Pedro, in Los Angeles, California.

== The Museum ==
The Los Angeles Maritime Museum is housed in the former Municipal Ferry Terminal building, located on the main channel of the Los Angeles Harbor. It was designed in the Streamline Moderne style by architect Derwood Lydell Irvin of the Los Angeles Harbor Department. It was built in 1941 at Berth 84, by the Works Project Administration (WPA).

The ferry between San Pedro and Terminal Island ceased after the Vincent Thomas Bridge was opened to traffic in 1963. The building was then used for offices of the LA Harbor Department. The San Pedro Municipal Ferry Building is now a Los Angeles Historic-Cultural Monument and listed on the National Register of Historic Places.

The Los Angeles Maritime Museum opened in 1979 as a result of widespread community efforts to save the historic building. It is the largest maritime museum on the West Coast. The museum's interior renovation was designed by Modernist architect James Pulliam. The museum is operated by the City of Los Angeles Department of Recreation and Parks.

The museum is open Tuesday through Sunday, from 10 AM to 5 PM.

=== Exhibits ===
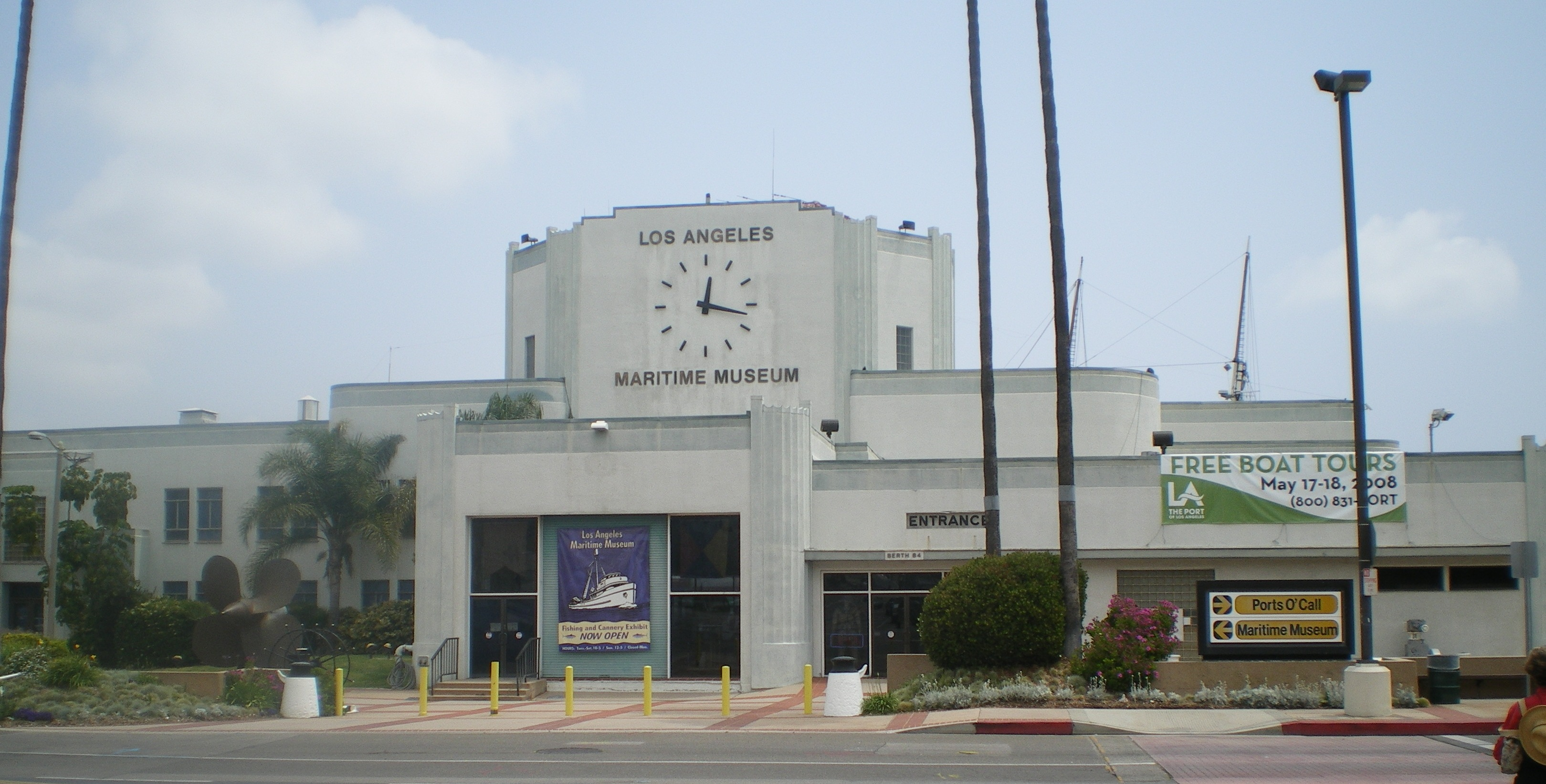
Streamline Moderne Harbor Avenue facade and clock tower of museum.

Exhibits include a history of commercial diving in Los Angeles Harbor and a Navy Hall that features large ship models such as the U.S. Navy cruiser Los Angeles and the SS Poseidon model from the 1972 disaster film The Poseidon Adventure.

The museum also has an exhibit that chronicles the once thriving San Pedro fishing industry. The commercial fishing exhibit focuses on the history of Los Angeles Harbor-based purse (net) seining, the San Pedro Fishermen's Fiesta, and the Terminal Island tuna canneries.

Upstairs are models of merchant ships such as the Silverpalm, square riggers, sail boats, and also a fully operational ham radio station.

The museum operates the tugboat Angels Gate, built in 1944 for the Army Transportation Service. Angels Gate was originally known as ST-695, and was among the fleet of tugboats designed for the World War II European theater. The fireboat Ralph J. Scott, a U.S. National Historic Landmark, is docked nearby.

== See also ==
- Maritime history of California
- Maritime museums in California
- Museums in Los Angeles
