= Cal Poly Pomona College of Letters, Arts, and Social Sciences =

Coordinates: 34.050002°N 117.815188°W

- Type: Public College
- Parent institution: Cal Poly Pomona
- Dean: Camille Su-lin Johnson
- Students: 3,472 (Fall 2016)
- Undergraduates: 3,275 (Fall 2016)
- Postgraduates: 197 (Fall 2016)
- Location: Pomona, California, U.S.
- Colors: Green and Gold
- Website: www.cpp.edu/class

The Cal Poly Pomona College of Letters, Arts, and Social Sciences is the humanities, social sciences, and performing arts college at California State Polytechnic University, Pomona (Cal Poly Pomona) located in Pomona, California, United States. The College of Letters, Arts & Social Sciences (C.L.A.S.S.) educates students in eleven disciplines of study: Communication, Economics, English and Modern Languages, Geography and Anthropology, History, Music, Philosophy, Political Science, Psychology and Sociology, Ethnic and Women's Studies, and Theater and New Dance.

- Academy Award-winning actor, Forest Whitaker, attended Cal Poly Pomona as a Music major.
- Former U.S. Labor Secretary Hilda Solis received her bachelor's degree in political science from the College of Letters, Arts, and Social Sciences at Cal Poly Pomona and then returned as a lecturer in 2013.
