= Takeo Uesugi =

Japanese-American landscape architect

Takeo Uesugi (上杉武夫, Uesugi Takeo; 1940 – January 26, 2016) was a Japanese-American landscape architect who designed acclaimed Japanese garden installations. He was a graduate of the University of California, Berkeley, and Kyoto University.

== Works ==
Born in Osaka, Uesugi's prominent works include:

- The James Irvine Garden at the Japanese American Cultural and Community Center, Little Tokyo, Los Angeles
- The Huntington Japanese Garden at the Huntington Library in San Marino, California
- The Gardens of Belief at the City of Hope National Medical Center
- The Japan Pavilion at the Expo '70, Suita, Osaka
- The Hotel Nikko (now Grand Hyatt Atlanta in Buckhead) in Atlanta, Georgia
- The Japanese Friendship Garden Expansion at Balboa Park
- The Washington Center in Washington D.C.
- The George and Sakaye Aratani Japanese Garden on the campus of Cal Poly Pomona

== Honors ==
Uesugi's honors include the National Landscape Award presented by First Lady Nancy Reagan in a 1981 White House ceremony that recognized his design of the James Irvine Garden. This garden is widely regarded as one of the finest public spaces in Los Angeles. In 2010, he was awarded the Order of the Sacred Treasure, Gold Rays with Neck Ribbon, from the Government of Japan to honor his work fostering the development of Japanese gardens throughout the world. As such, he joined an elite group of recipients including fellow Japanese American landscape architect and designer Isamu Noguchi.

Uesugi was the president of his own landscape design firm and a professor emeritus in landscape architecture at Cal Poly Pomona's College of Environmental Design where he helped establish an exchange program with Kyushu University.
