= J. Michael Ortiz =

5th President of California State Polytechnic University, Pomona
- In office August 1, 2003 – December 31, 2014
- Preceded by: Bob H. Suzuki
- Succeeded by: Soraya M. Coley

Personal details
- Education: University of North Carolina at Chapel Hill; University of New Mexico
- Profession: Professor of education
- Website: Office of the President

J. Michael Ortiz is an American educator and the 5th president of Cal Poly Pomona. Prior to this appointment on August 1, 2003 Ortiz was professor of education at Appalachian State University and vice president for academic affairs at Fresno State. He was listed in 2005 as one of the 100 most influential Hispanics in 2005 by Hispanic Business magazine. In 2008 Latino Magazine named him one of the Top 25 Latinos in Education.

Ortiz announced on January 30, 2014 that he would be stepping down as President of Cal Poly Pomona at the end of 2014. He was succeeded by Soraya M. Coley, who served as Provost and Vice President of Academic Affairs of California State University Bakersfield since 2005.

== Background ==
Ortiz's professional leadership activities include:

- AASCU Christa McAuliffe Presidential Selection Committee
- AASCU Committee on Teacher Education
- AASCU Task Force on Sustainability
- ACE Commission on Advancement of Racial and Ethnic Equity
- American College & University Presidents Climate Commitment Leadership Circle
- Aspen Institute Commission on No Child Left Behind
- BACCHUS and GAMMA Peer Education Network Board of Trustees
- CCAA Presidents/Chancellors Group Board of Directors
- California State University (CSU) Agricultural Research Initiative Board of Governors, Vice Chair
- CSU Presidents' Council on Underserved Constituencies
- California Campus Compact, Executive Board of Directors
- DoD/HACU Department of Defense/Hispanic Serving Institution Task Force
- North Central Association, Consultant Evaluator
- Western Association of Schools and Colleges (WASC), Program Evaluator
- USDA/HSI Collaborative Advisory Board

He holds a bachelors, a master's degree from the University of New Mexico and a PhD from the University of North Carolina at Chapel Hill.

== Possible departure ==
On October 27, 2009, Cal Poly Pomona student-run newspaper The Poly Post informed the campus community of Ortiz's possible departure to New Mexico State University.

Academic offices
Preceded by Bob H. Suzuki	President of Cal Poly Pomona; August 1, 2003– December 31, 2014	Succeeded by Soraya M. Coley
