= Michele Saee =

Michele Saee (born December 2, 1956) is a Los Angeles–based architect, designer and educator.

== Early life and education ==
Saee was born in Tehran, Iran. In 1981, he received his Master of Art in Architecture degree from the University of Florence Italy. In 1982, Saee received his post graduate degree in Technical Urban Planning at the Polytechnic of Milan. In 1985, Saee started his own architectural design office in Los Angeles.

== Career ==
Saee started his professional career working with the avant-garde architectural office of Superstudio (Natalini, Toraldo Di Francia, Magris and Frassinelli) in Florence and joined Morphosis (Mayne, Rotondi) when he moved to Los Angeles in 1983.

Saee taught environmental and architectural design at Otis Art Institute of Parsons School of Design in Los Angeles. In 1990, Saee began teaching at the Southern Southern California Institute of Architecture (SCI-Arc) and other schools in the U.S. and abroad. Saee exhibits and lectures on architecture in many countries around the world. Saee's exhibitions includes: "The Venice Architectural Biennial 2002, Italy", "Busan Biennial, Korea 2002", "Venice Architectural Biennial 2004", and "The First Architectural Biennial Beijing China 2004".

Saee started his design studio in 1985, since then he has designed more than 100 projects and more than half of them are built.

== Teaching ==
- University of southern California, USC, Los Angeles, California, Visiting Professor, 2012
- Southern California Institute of Architecture, Los Angeles, California, 1990–2007, Visiting Professor Spring 2009, 2010 Public Access Press Committee (founding group), 1994 WASC Accreditation Advisory Board, 1995
- Tecnologico De Monterrey, CADi Cuorso de Actualizacion en las Disciplinas, Guadalajara Mexico, June 2010
- UCLA, University of California Los Angeles, School of Architecture, Visiting Professor, 2001
- Cal Poly Pomona College of Environmental Design, Visiting Professor, 1998–99
- RWTH Aachen, Germany, Lehr-und Forschungsgebiet Architekturtheorie, Visiting professor, January 1999
- UCLA Extension, Santa Monica, California,1995–1998
- Otis Art Institute of Parsons School of Design, Los Angeles, California,1986–1990

== Major projects ==
Completed

- Bay Cities Appliances Showroom Beverly Hills, California, US, 2011
- Hodjatie Residence, Pacific Palisades, California, US, 2010
- Sky exhibition Pavilion, Beijing, China, 2007
- The Museum of Antiquity, 2006
- Template house, Beijing, China, 2005
- Publicis Drugstore, Paris, France, 2004
- Café Nescafe, Paris, France, 2004
- Linnie House, Venice, California, US, 2004
- Cellular fantasy, Santa Monica, California, SA, 2003
- Beverly Hills Cosmetic Dental Clinic, Beverly Hills, California, 1992
- Pave Jewelry Store, Brentwood, California, 1991
- Sun House, Fullerton, California, 1990
- Ecru Clothing Store, Marina del Rey, California, 1989
- Angeli Mare, Marina del Rey, California, 1989
- Jones-Chapman Residence, Brentwood, California,
- Ecru Clothing Store, Phase II/Melrose, Los Angeles, California, 1988
- Design Express Furniture Store, Los Angeles, California, 1987
- Ecru Clothing Store, Los Angeles, California, 1987
- Trattoria Angeli, Los Angeles, California, 1986
- 434 Apartment Complex, Los Angeles, California, 1986
- Tahiti Marina Apartments & Dock, Marina Del Rey, California, US
- Glenroy Residence, Los Angeles, California, US
- Qingdao Bridge, Qingdao, China
- Underwater World Xiamen, Xiamen, China

In Progress

- Sun Rise Apartments, Los Angeles, California, US
- Sherman Way Apartments, Los Angeles, California, US
- Lincoln mixed-used Commercial/Residential Unit Addition, Santa Monica, California, US
- Robertson Commercial & Office, Los Angeles, California, US
- Altshuler Residence, pacific palisades, California, US
- Maple Apartments Rehabilitation, Beverly Hills, California, US

== Awards ==
- City of Beverly Hills Architectural Design Award, 2011 Interarch,
- 2009 Interior Design China, Hall of Fame Award, 2007 LA 12 Award, 2000,
- Interarch 2009, Special Prize of the Mayor of Strasbourg Silver medal
- Interior Design China, 2007, Hall of Fame Award.
- LA 12 Award, 2000.
- American Institute of Architects Design Award, 1997.
- American Institute of Architects, 1997, "next LA" Design Award.
- " Emerging Voices", 1997, selection by “The Architectural League of New York”
- "40 under 40", 1995, (the most promising American architects under the age of 40)
- "Young Architects Forum Design Award," 1987, The Architectural League of New York
