= Shooting of Michael Ortiz =

2021 police shooting in Hollywood, FL, US

- Date: July 3, 2021
- Time: (EST)
- Venue: Hollywood Blvd apartment complex
- Location: Hollywood, Florida, United States
- Type: mental health crisis, police shooting
- Cause: Hollywood Police Department (Florida), Hollywood Fire Department
- Filmed by: apartment security cameras
- Participants: Michael Ortiz; Other police officers
- Footage

Michael Ortiz was shot in the back by police while handcuffed in Hollywood, Florida on July 3, 2021. He is now paralyzed from the waist down due to the gunshot. He also lost control of his bodily functions, suffered damage to his pancreas and has accumulated $1 million in medical bills.

== Incident ==
=== 911 call and response ===
Ortiz called 911 and reported himself as having a mental health crisis due to his dog being missing. According to the Hollywood police, Ortiz told the 911 dispatcher that he had “chest pains, ingestion of narcotics and, according to the Fire Rescue call log, was making delusional and suicidal statements.” After calling 911, Ortiz's family convinced him to take a shower in order to calm down. Hollywood Fire Rescue arrived at Ortiz's apartment, and stated that “he refused to answer the door so Fire Rescue requested Hollywood Police respond with lights and sirens.” According to Fire Rescue, Ortiz then came out of his apartment without any clothes on and became combative with paramedics, threatening suicide. Hollywood Police arrived as the paramedics were attempting to restrain Ortiz from jumping off of the balcony.

=== Force ===
According to the police, an officer then tasered Ortiz to subdue him, and he was handcuffed. An officer later told Ortiz's family that he was tasered twice and that he was “shot on the shoulder.” Ortiz struggled as officers attempted to escort him to the elevator. During the struggle an officer shot Ortiz in the back. Police and Fire Rescue officers then moved Ortiz to the elevator to get him medical treatment. Six Police and Fire Rescue officers were involved.

=== Review ===
Hollywood Police later said that “an initial review suggests the officer intended to deploy his taser, but instead discharged his firearm.” The Florida Department of Law Enforcement investigation is ongoing and the unnamed officer was relieved of duty and given administrative duties within the department.

== Outcome and legal proceedings ==
Ortiz was in a coma for several weeks. He described his recovery as like being reborn, with such challenges as getting out of bed and using the restroom. Ortiz's family were initially represented by Morgan and Morgan law firm, and on July 12 sent Hollywood Police a request to preserve all evidence and records. Morgan and Morgan stated that they made a public records request in writing via postal mail, but Hollywood Police claim that they have no record of receiving such a request.

On February 7, 2022, Ortiz and his family held a press conference with their new attorney, civil rights lawyer Ben Crump. Crump announced a public record's lawsuit against Hollywood Police, specifically in regards to security camera footage from the apartment complex that would have documented the entire incident. Crump stated that “you must release the video that shows us why your police officer shot a man — that was stark naked, handcuffed — in the back and paralyzed him.”

In September 2022 Officer Henry Andrews, who fired the shot, was indicted on a charge of culpable negligence, inflicting actual personal injury.

In March 2023, Ortiz filed a lawsuit against Hollywood and Andrews seeking damages for his injuries and healthcare costs.

== See also ==
- 2020–2022 United States racial unrest
- Killing of Daunte Wright
