= Don B. Huntley College of Agriculture =

American college

Cal Poly Pomona Don B. Huntley College of Agriculture
- Motto: Instrumentum Disciplinae (Latin: "Application of Knowledge")
- Type: Public College
- Established: 1938; 88 years ago
- Parent institution: Cal Poly Pomona
- Dean: Lisa Kessler (interim)
- Faculty: 34
- Students: 2,062 (fall 2016)
- Undergraduates: 2,002 (fall 2016)
- Postgraduates: 60 (fall 2016)
- Location: Pomona, California, U.S. 34°3′29.2″N 117°49′33.32″W
- Colors: Green and gold
- Website: www.cpp.edu/agri
- Location within the Los Angeles metropolitan area

The Don B. Huntley College of Agriculture is the agricultural college of California State Polytechnic University, Pomona (Cal Poly Pomona) located in Pomona, California, United States. Founded in 1938, the college offers instruction in eight majors leading to the bachelor of science degree. Over 700 acres (2.8 km^{2}) of university-owned land are available for pastures, crops, groves and ornamental plantings.

== Admissions ==
First-Time Freshmen Profile
	2004	2005	2006	2007	2008	2009	2010	2011	2012
Enrollment	178	217	218	280	222	215	162	275	243
Average GPA	3.37	3.30	3.29	3.37	3.38	3.42	3.43	3.39	3.51
Average SAT (out of 1600)	991	974	938	986	1017	1045	1073	1032	1047

== Facilities ==
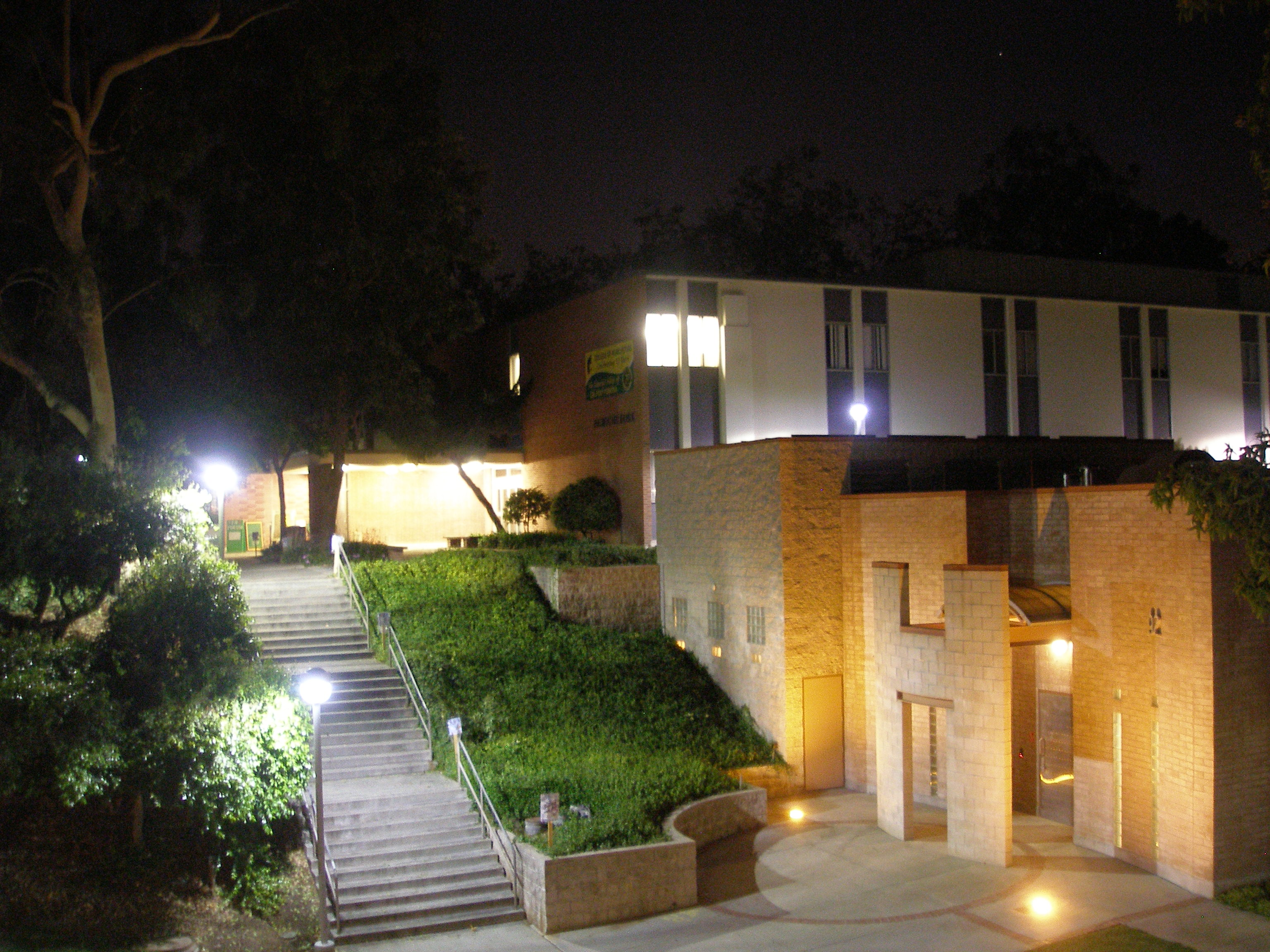
View of the College of Agriculture main building (background)

The vast number of buildings comprising the College of Agriculture are located throughout campus. Building 2 houses the majority of classrooms, laboratories and faculty offices, as well as in Building 45 and the College of Environmental Design – Building 7.

- Production units which include a citrus packing house and meat science processing laboratory
- Farm Store and landscape nursery
- 40,000 square feet (3,700 m^{2}) of green houses and shade houses
- 700 acres (2.8 km^{2}) devoted to pastures, crops, groves and ornamental plantings
- Livestock units that house cattle, swine and sheep
- Pine Tree Ranch, a 53 acres (0.21 km^{2}) citrus and avocado ranch in Santa Paula, Ventura Country
- W. K. Kellogg Arabian Horse Center, a modern horse breeding, training and showing facility
- Apparel Technology and Research Center, a research center which provides outreach education and resource information service to the apparel and sewn products industry
- Center for Turf, Irrigation, and Landscape Technology (CTILT), focused on landscape and irrigation research and development
- The Center for Antimicrobial Research and Food Safety, which addresses foodborne pathogens
- The Spadra Ranch, 125 acres (0.51 km^{2}), devoted to vegetable and fruit production as well as a home to student and faculty research projects
- Agriscapes, directly across the street from the main campus, is an agriculture education and outreach facility featuring a classroom, Petting Farm, Farm Store and an Ornamental Horticulture unit. Over 40,000 square feet (3,700 m^{2}) of greenhouse supports research and production of edible and ornamental plants hydroponic production and plans for a future conservatory. Agriscapes is home to the Annual Pumpkin Festival, the largest non-athletic event in the California State University System as well as other agricultural themed events and field trips.
- A Model Agriculture Education Classroom is housed in building 2 for application-based hands on learning dedicated to developing the skills of students preparing to enter agricultural education professions.
