= Cal Poly Pomona College of Environmental Design =

Coordinates: 34°03′26″N 117°49′38″W

- Type: Public College; Space Grant
- Established: January 1971
- Parent institution: California State Polytechnic University, Pomona
- Academic affiliations: National Architectural Accrediting Board; Association of Collegiate Schools of Architecture
- Dean: Mary Anne Alabanza Akers
- Students: 1,632 (Fall 2001)
- Undergraduates: 1,480
- Postgraduates: 152
- Location: Pomona, California, U.S.
- Website: www.cpp.edu/cenv
- Location within the Los Angeles metropolitan area Location within California Location within the United States

The Cal Poly Pomona College of Environmental Design is a college part of the California State Polytechnic University, Pomona (Cal Poly Pomona). The college houses over 1,600 students; making it one of largest environmental design programs in the United States. The college offers bachelor's degrees in five departments, as well as three master's degree programs. It is the only academic unit within the California State University system to be associated with a Pritzker Prize laureate (often referred to as "The Nobel Prize in Architecture").

== History ==
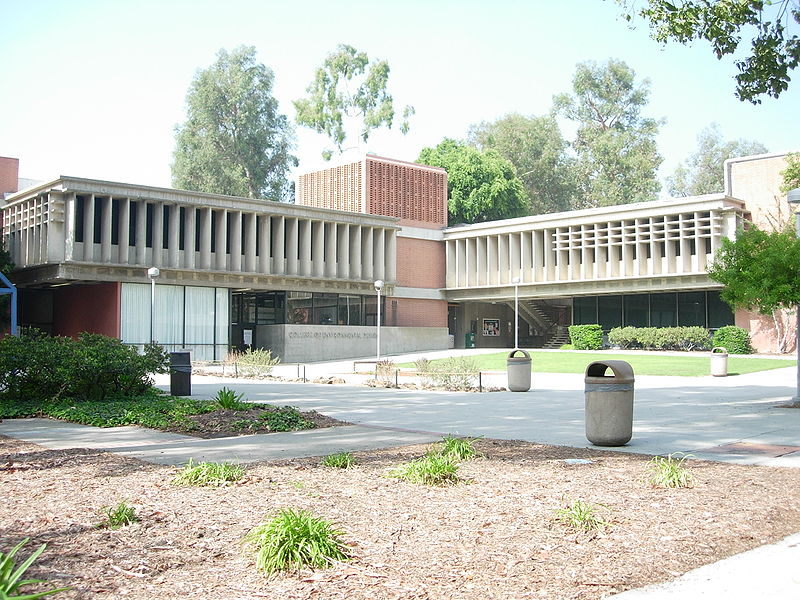
College of Environmental Design, Cal Poly Pomona

The planning programs at Cal Poly Pomona evolved from the undergraduate landscape architecture program that originally was part of the School of Agriculture. After approval of the creation of a new School of Environmental Design, the landscape and urban planning programs moved into their current building in January 1971. The Department of Urban Planning was created and soon after a Department of Architecture. Department of Urban Planning was renamed "Department of Urban and Regional Planning" in 1983 to reflect an expanded program. The School was renamed the "College of Environmental Design" in 1988. The Department of Art was transferred to Environmental Design from the College of Arts in 1992.

In 1978, the college was briefly led by Richard Saul Wurman, founder of the TED (conference) and given credit for coining the term "information architect".

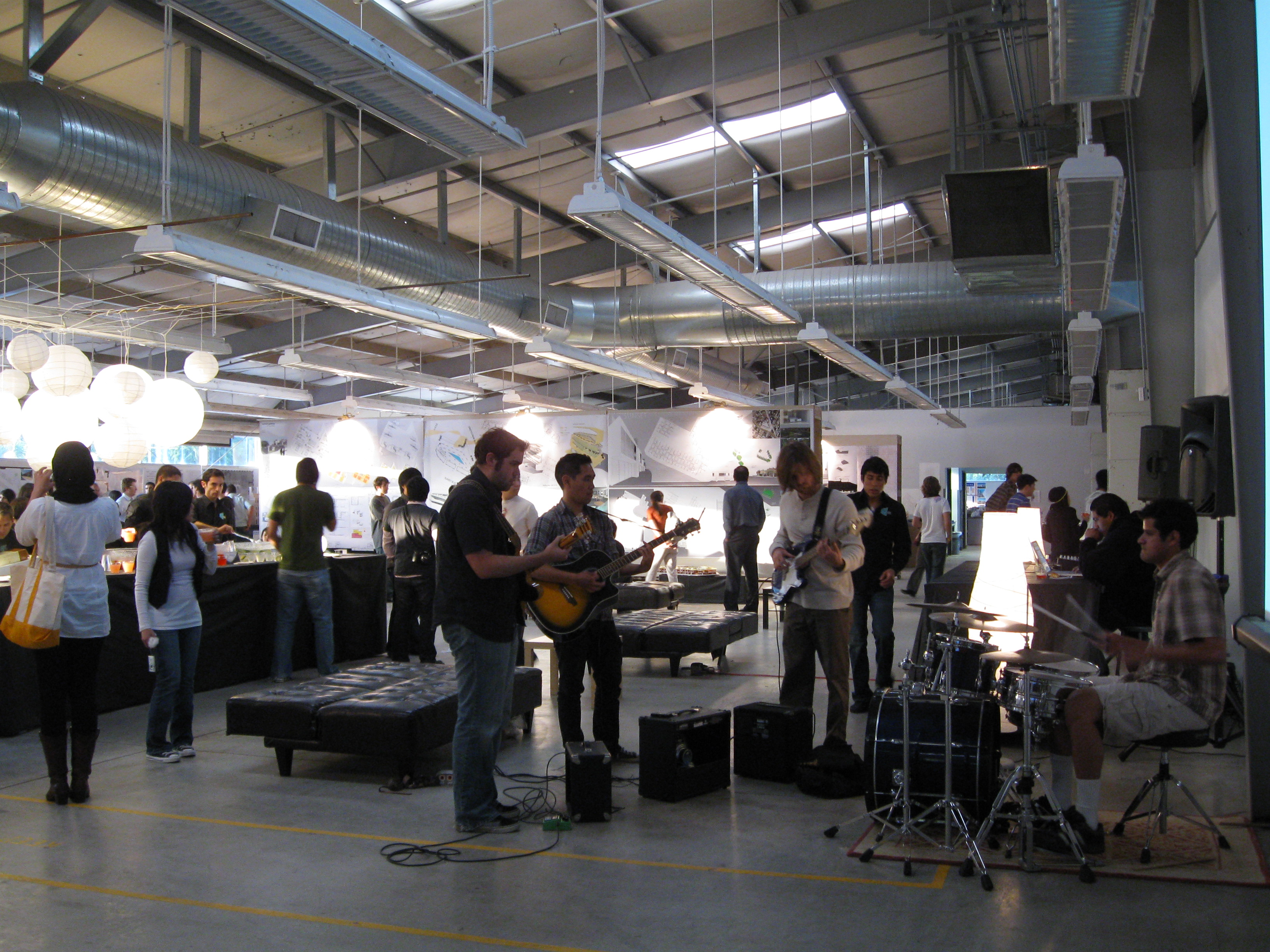
IDC (Interim Design Center)

In the summer of 2009 the university hired former Los Angeles City Councilman and current member of the Planning Commission Michael Woo to serve as Dean of the college.

The college is housed in several buildings around campus including Building 7, designed by modernist architect Carl Maston, and the IDC (Interim Design Center), a 30,000-square-foot (2,800 m^{2}) design studio building at the east end of the campus. Current plans are for a new Architecture Building adjacent to the IDC (Interim Design Center).

== Admissions ==
ENV First-Time Freshmen Profile
	2004	2005	2006	2007	2008	2009	2010	2011	2012
Enrollment	174	220	194	236	159	149	130	194	203
Average GPA	3.44	3.44	3.43	3.42	3.57	3.64	3.58	3.40	3.44
Average SAT (out of 1600)	1066	1050	1055	1058	1109	1111	1125	1080	1053

== Rankings ==
Design Intelligence Rankings (National)
	2014
Architecture Undergraduate	16th
Landscape Architecture Undergraduate	10th
Landscape Architecture Graduate	15th
Interior Architecture Graduate	4th

== Academic programs and departments ==
=== Architecture ===
The Department of Architecture is a member of the Association of Collegiate Schools of Architecture. Two programs are accredited by the National Architectural Accrediting Board. The undergraduate program was ranked 16th nationally in the 2014 edition of "America's Best Architecture & Design Schools" published by the journal DesignIntelligence and was in the top 20 in the 2011 survey. In 2009, the program was named one of three schools in the nation that excel in sustainable design by Arch Ed 2009 published by Architect Magazine. The program has been "impacted" since its inception over 40 years ago, with many more students applying than can be accommodated. In 2002 the department admitted 15 percent of undergraduate applicants making it the 5th most selective Bachelor of Architecture program in the country. By 2007 the department's acceptance rate was down to 9 percent, or 225 out of 2,551 applicants, of which 100 enrolled.

Due to the design studio based structure of the program, the student to faculty ratio is a relatively low 17 to 1. Prior to graduation students are required to complete a 500-hour internship under NCARB.

Notable and influential 20th-century architects that have taught at the department include Richard Neutra, Raphael Soriano Craig Ellwood, Richard Saul Wurman, Thom Mayne, James Pulliam and Ray Kappe, who together with Bernard Zimmerman founded the program in 1968. After a falling out with university administrators, a group went on to form the Southern California Institute of Architecture (SCI-Arc) in 1972. Past faculty include: Aaron Betsky, Michele Saee, Michael Folonis, Hsin Ming Fung, and Margaret Griffin.

==== Architecture Undergraduate Admissions ====
Avg. GPA	Avg. SAT/1,600	Avg. ACT
3.83	1,210	24

==== Undergraduate demographics ====
Minority	Female	International	Financial Aid
66%	42%	4%	61%

==== Student - faculty ratio ====
Student/Faculty ratio
18:1

==== Architecture Rankings ====
According to the 2018 Design Intelligence rankings:

- Top 25 Undergraduate Programs in the United States: No. 12 Nationally
- Top 10 Interior Design Program in the United States: No. 8 Nationally
- Top Ten Program in Project Planning & Management in the United States: No. 7 Nationally
- Top Ten Program in Construction methods and Materials in the United States: No. 6 Nationally
- Top Ten Program in Practice Management in the United States: No. 5 Nationally
- Top Ten Program in Sustainable Design Practices & Principles in the United States: No. 10 Nationally
- Top Ten Program in Healthy Environments in the United States: No. 8 Nationally
- Top Ten Program in Engineering Fundamentals in the United States: No. 5 Nationally

=== Art ===
The Art Department offers two majors: A B.F.A in Visual Communication Design, leading to a Bachelor of Fine Arts degree, a B.A. in Art History, leading to a Bachelor of Arts degree. The Art Department also offers three minors, a minor in Visual Communication Design, a minor in Studio Arts, and a minor in Art History.

=== Landscape Architecture ===
The Bachelor of Science in Landscape Architecture (BSLA) is a general professional degree, nationally accredited by the American Society of Landscape Architects. The undergraduate and graduate program both ranked 10th nationally by DesignIntelligence 2014. The department's students won 5 out of 20 awards from the American Society of Landscape Architects student competition in 2008, more awards than Harvard and University of Pennsylvania. Longtime faculty member Takeo Uesugi designed the George and Takaye Aratani Japanese Garden adjacent to the CLA building on campus. In 2005, the college awarded Jack Dangermond, a department graduate and Forbes 400 richest persons in America, an honorary degree. Due to the design studio based structure of the program, the student to faculty ratio is a relatively low 16 to 1.

=== Urban and Regional Planning ===
The Bachelor of Science in Urban and Regional Planning is designed for students interested in working with the critical issues of social, environmental, and physical change in cities and regions. Student to faculty ratio is 24 to 1. In 2008, the program was ranked 21st in the nation for Best Urban & Regional Planning graduate program amongst all private and public schools, according to Planetizen, an online publication for the urban planning, design and development community and 2nd best for programs without a Ph.D.

=== Lyle Center for Regenerative Studies ===
Located on 16 acres (65,000 m^{2}) within the Cal Poly Pomona University campus, the Center researches and demonstrates a wide array of regenerative strategies including low-energy architecture, energy production technology, water treatment, organic agriculture, ecological restoration and sustainable community development. Up to 20 students can choose to reside in one of two dormitories on site. The center offers a Minor in Regenerative Studies and a Master of Science degree in Regenerative Studies. The center became the first carbon neutral facility in the California State University system.

== Special programs ==
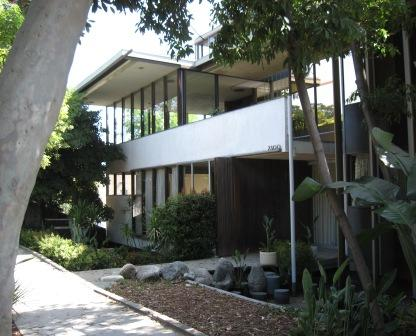
Neutra VDL House

- Richard Neutra - VDL House - The college maintains the house of renowned modernist architect Richard Neutra, whose wife left the house to the college to continue his legacy. The house serves as a laboratory for the study of historic preservation and sustainable design and has been used to host college guests and design studio presentations.
- Office for International Studies - The college encourages students to participate in study abroad programs through the CSU International Programs in Italy, Denmark and Canada. In addition the college maintains direct exchange programs in architecture with the École Spéciale d'Architecture in Paris France, the Royal Melbourne Institute of Technology in Australia, Kyushu University in Japan, the National Technical University of Athens in Greece, University of Strathclyde in Glasgow Scotland, Hochschule Biberach in Germany, and the National Taiwan University of Science and Technology, Tamkang University and Chaoyang University of Technology in Taiwan. An average of 60 to 80 students participate each year in the various programs. Under existing agreements, a number of foreign students also study each year at the college.
- Resource Center - A resource library containing 25,000 books, periodicals, technical reports and a special collection of documents from the architectural offices of Richard Neutra, Craig Ellwood, Raphael Soriano, Garrett Eckbo and Donald Wexler.
- W. Keith and Janet Kellogg Art Gallery - Located in building 35A, the 4,500-square-foot (420 m^{2}) gallery hosts contemporary art exhibits for the campus and greater Los Angeles community. The building was designed by architecture instructor James Pulliam and its sculpture garden and entry gates were designed by Italian industrial designer Ettore Sottsass.
- Neutra Medal for Professional Excellence - An annual award given in recognition of an individual's contribution to the environmental design profession. Past recipients include Renzo Piano, Harwell Hamilton Harris (1982), Kisho Kurokawa (1988), Herman Hertzberger, Konrad Wachsmann (1980), Ralph Rapson (1984), Bruce Schneider-Wessling (1985), Lawrence Halprin (1986), Ian McHarg (1992), Moshe Safdie (1993), Jaime Lerner (1994), Albert Frey (1996), Glenn Murcutt (1998), Samuel Mockbee, Francis Dean, Raymond Kappe, Al Gore (1999), Rafael Viñoly (2000), Jones and Jones (2007), Thom Mayne (2011), Tadao Ando (2012), Michael Rotondi (2014), Enrique Norten (2015). and Carme Pinós (2016).
- Schrage House - In 2011, the college was pledged the Schrage House designed by renowned Mid-Century Modern architect Raphael Soriano in the 1950s. The $3 million bequest includes funding for the future maintenance of the home.
- The Dale Prize - "The Dale Prize recognizes planning excellence, creates dialogue between scholars and practitioners, and enriches the education of planning students. Scholar and practitioner awardees demonstrate excellence in a common topic that is selected each year. Awardees spend two days on the campus, meeting with students and participating in a colloquium. The Dale Prize is made possible by an endowment provided by June Dale, wife of the late William R. Dale (Bill Dale)."
- Link Magazine - A twice a year publication showcasing the accomplishments of students, faculty and alumni in the fields of Architecture, Landscape Architecture, Art and Urban Planning.
