= Biberach University of Applied Sciences =

Science school in Biberach an der Riss, Germany

- Established: 1964
- Principal: André Bleicher
- Administrative staff: 500 (80 professors, 200 lecturers, 220 employees)
- Students: 2500 (Winter Semester 2017/2018)
- Location: Biberach an der Riss, Baden-Württemberg, Germany; 48°05′37″N 9°47′18″E
- Website: https://www.hochschule-biberach.de

The Biberach University of Applied Sciences - Hochschule Biberach - emerged in 1971 out of the public engineering school for architecture, which had been founded in 1964. The study Business Administration in Civil Engineering / Real Estate Marketing was added in 1978. The course in Business Administration at the University of Applied Science Biberach was the first course in this area in Germany. In 1991 the courses in Civil Engineering and Project Management were established. In 1998 the course in Building Services Engineering was added.

In winter semester 2006/2007 the course in Pharmaceutic Bioengineering was established, which was unique in Germany at the time. This course is supported by the company Boehringer Ingelheim. In summer semester 2008, the course in Energy Systems was established in cooperation with University of Applied Sciences Ulm. This cooperation extended to the masters course. Since March 2011 a post-grad colloquium is possible on this course.
