= Eddy Hartenstein =

American businessman

- Born: Alhambra, California
- Education: Cal Poly Pomona (B.S. aerospace engineering and mathematics); Caltech (M.S.)
- Occupations: Board member and Lead independent Director at Sirius XM Radio Board member and Lead independent Director at Broadcom Director at Tribune Publishing Director at TiVo
- Website: Eddy Hartenstein

Eddy W. Hartenstein is a business leader with a career in the media industry. Hartenstein currently serves as a board member at Broadcom, where he is also lead independent director, TiVo, and Sirius XM Radio, where he is also lead independent director. He also remains a director of Tribune Publishing. He previously served as a director on the boards of City of Hope, Oath (formerly Yahoo!), SanDisk, Technicolor (formerly Thompson Consumer Electronics) and Converse (prior to the acquisition by Nike).

== Early life ==
Born in Alhambra, California, like many students of the era, Hartenstein's interest in technology and aerospace/technology were sparked by the space race. Hartenstein earned Bachelor of Science degrees in aerospace engineering and mathematics from Cal Poly Pomona. He then joined Hughes Aircraft in 1972, and in 1974, earned a Master of Science degree in applied mechanics from Caltech. Hartenstein also has an honorary Doctor of Science degree from Cal Poly Pomona.

== Career ==
As Vice President of Hughes Communications in 1981, he expanded Hughes’ acquisition and deployment of commercial communications satellites. In 1990, he was named President of a Hughes-owned subsidiary founded to develop direct-to-home satellite TV service, which he grew into DirecTV.

In 2001, Hartenstein was elected a member of the National Academy of Engineering for leadership in developing and implementing satellite digital video and data transmission systems for direct delivery into homes.

He served as DirecTV’s chairman and CEO through 2004, when the company was sold to News Corp.

In August 2008, Hartenstein joined the Los Angeles Times as publisher and chief executive officer and served in that role through August 2014.

From 2009 to 2013, Hartenstein served as chairman of Sirius XM Radio’s board. After being succeeded as chairman by Greg Maffei, he remained on the board.

Prior to January 2013, he was president and chief executive officer of Tribune Media Company.

== Recognition ==
Hartenstein was inducted into the National Academy of Engineering (NAE) Class of 2001 and into the Broadcasting & Cable Hall of Fame in 2002. In 2007, Hartenstein received an Emmy from the National Academy of Television Arts and Sciences for lifetime achievement, and was inducted into the Consumer Electronics Association Hall of Fame in 2008.
