= Cal Poly Pomona College of Business Administration =

Business college

- Motto: Instrumentum Disciplinae (Latin: "Application of Knowledge")
- Type: Public College; Space Grant
- Established: 1968; 58 years ago
- Parent institution: Cal Poly Pomona
- Academic affiliations: AACSB International
- Dean: Erik Rolland
- Academic staff: 146 (2001)
- Administrative staff: 90
- Students: 4,919 (Fall 2016) (percent of total university enrollment: 19%)
- Undergraduates: 4,876 (Fall 2016)
- Postgraduates: 43 (Fall 2016)
- Location: Pomona, California, U.S. 34.0586°N 117.8228°W
- Colors: Green and Gold
- Website: www.cpp.edu/cba
- Location in the Los Angeles metropolitan area

The Cal Poly Pomona College of Business Administration is the business college at California State Polytechnic University, Pomona (Cal Poly Pomona) located in Pomona, California, United States. The College of Business Administration educates students in technical and managerial competence for business, industry, government and education. CBA is accredited by AACSB International.

== Admissions ==
First-Time Freshmen Profile
	2004	2005	2006	2007	2008	2009	2010	2011	2012
Enrollment	384	497	567	533	330	310	232	476	447
Average GPA	3.18	3.15	3.15	3.17	3.19	3.25	3.28	3.18	3.25
Average SAT	977	950	950	1111	1205	1230	1255	1270	1292

== Student clubs ==
- Bronco Makers Club, is a multi-disciplinary organization for young entrepreneurs based at Cal Poly Pomona.
- SWIFT, short for Students With an Interest in the Future of Technology, is Cal Poly Pomona's organization of professionals and students interested in cyber security and systems/network administration.
- MISSA, short for Management Information Systems Student Association, is a student organization at Cal Poly Pomona. The club was started by Computer Information Systems students as a chapter of ISACA which is open to all students. MISSA was formed to expose students to IT professionals, computing workshops, and social gatherings.
- ATOMS short for the Association of Technology and Operations Management Students, ATOMS exists to cultivate interest and foster growth in the diverse fields of Technology and Operations Management (TOM).
- Delta Sigma Pi was a coed professional business fraternity with over 220,000 collegiate and alumni members around the country. Originally chartered on campus in 1969. Before 1989 Delta Sigma Pi was an all-male fraternity at Cal Poly and very active on campus. The organization was formally rechartered in 2001 and has since grown to be one of the larger organizations in the college. As a business fraternity, students eligible to pledge and ultimately join must be majoring in any major within the College of Business, Economics, Food Marketing and Agribusiness, Apparel Merchandising and Management, or Hotel and Restaurant Management. Events focus on developing professionalism, encouraging networking, fostering friendships, and serving the community.
- The American Marketing Association The American Marketing Association goal is to foster students' marketing, advertising, and promotional skills and prepare them for the business environment.
