= San Pedro Municipal Ferry Building =

- U.S. National Register of Historic Places
- Los Angeles Historic-Cultural Monument
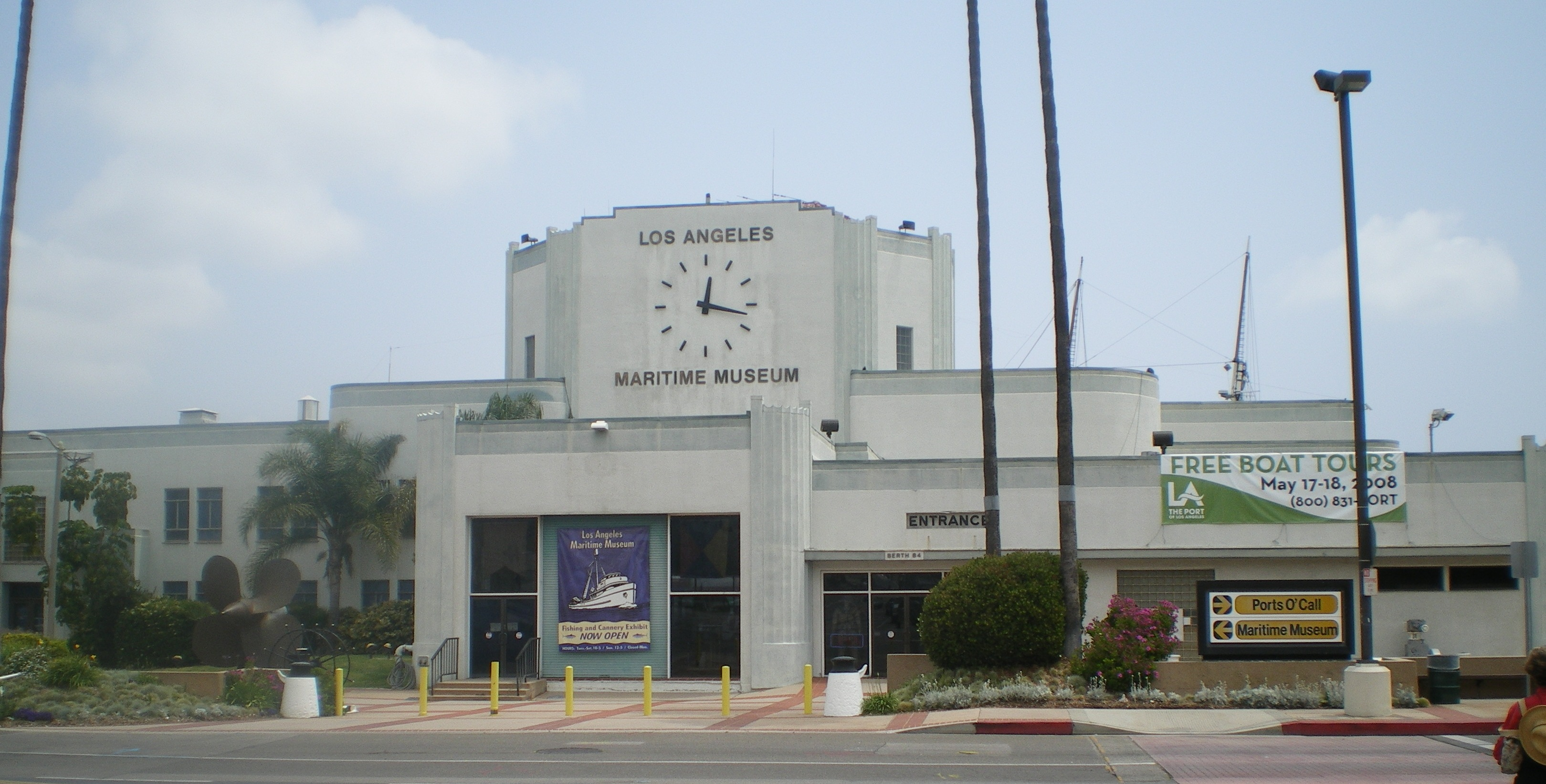
- San Pedro Municipal Ferry Building, housing the Los Angeles Maritime Museum.

- Location within the Los Angeles metropolitan area Location within California Location within the United States
- Location: Sixth Street at Harbor Boulevard, San Pedro, Los Angeles, California
- Coordinates: 33°44′19″N 118°16′43″W
- Architect: Derwood Lydell Irvin, B. Irvin, Los Angeles Harbor Department
- Architectural style: Streamline Moderne
- NRHP reference No.: 96000392
- LAHCM No.: 146

Significant dates
- Added to NRHP: April 12, 1996
- Designated LAHCM: 17 September 1975

San Pedro Municipal Ferry Building is a former Los Angeles Harbor Department ferry terminal building located at Sixth Street at Harbor Boulevard in the community of San Pedro in Los Angeles, California.

The historic landmark building now houses the Los Angeles Maritime Museum.

== History ==
The Municipal Ferry Building was built in 1941 as a Works Project Administration (WPA) project, built at Berth 84. It was designed in the Streamline Moderne style by architect Derwood Lydell Irvin of the Los Angeles Harbor Department. It has a five-story octagonal clock tower. Its "sister ferry terminal" was across the main channel at Berth 234, also Irvin designed in the Streamline Moderne and built by the WPA in 1941.

It was a working ferry terminal from 1941 to 1963, for the ferry connecting San Pedro and Terminal Island in the Los Angeles Harbor. During those years, the double-decked ferries "Islander" and "Ace" transported thousands of passengers and automobiles to and from the tuna canneries, docks, shipyards, and military bases on Terminal Island.

In 1963, the Vincent Thomas Bridge was completed, connecting mainland San Pedro to Terminal Island, and the ferry service became obsolete. The ferry service was terminated on 14 November, and the bridge opened on 15 November.

The San Pedro terminal building was used for many years as an office building by the Los Angeles Harbor Department. The ferry terminal building on the Terminal Island side was demolished in 1972 to expand cargo operations.

== Museum ==
As the ferry building began to deteriorate, citizens of San Pedro sought to have it restored. They succeeded in having the building designated as a Los Angeles Historic-Cultural Monument (no. 146) in 1975.

Beginning in 1976 the building was restored (exterior) and remodeled (interior) into the Los Angeles Maritime Museum, which opened in 1979. It is the largest maritime museum on the West Coast.

The building was listed on the National Register of Historic Places in 1996.

Media

Both the exterior and interior of the Municipal Ferry Building were featured in the 1947 film The Street With No Name.

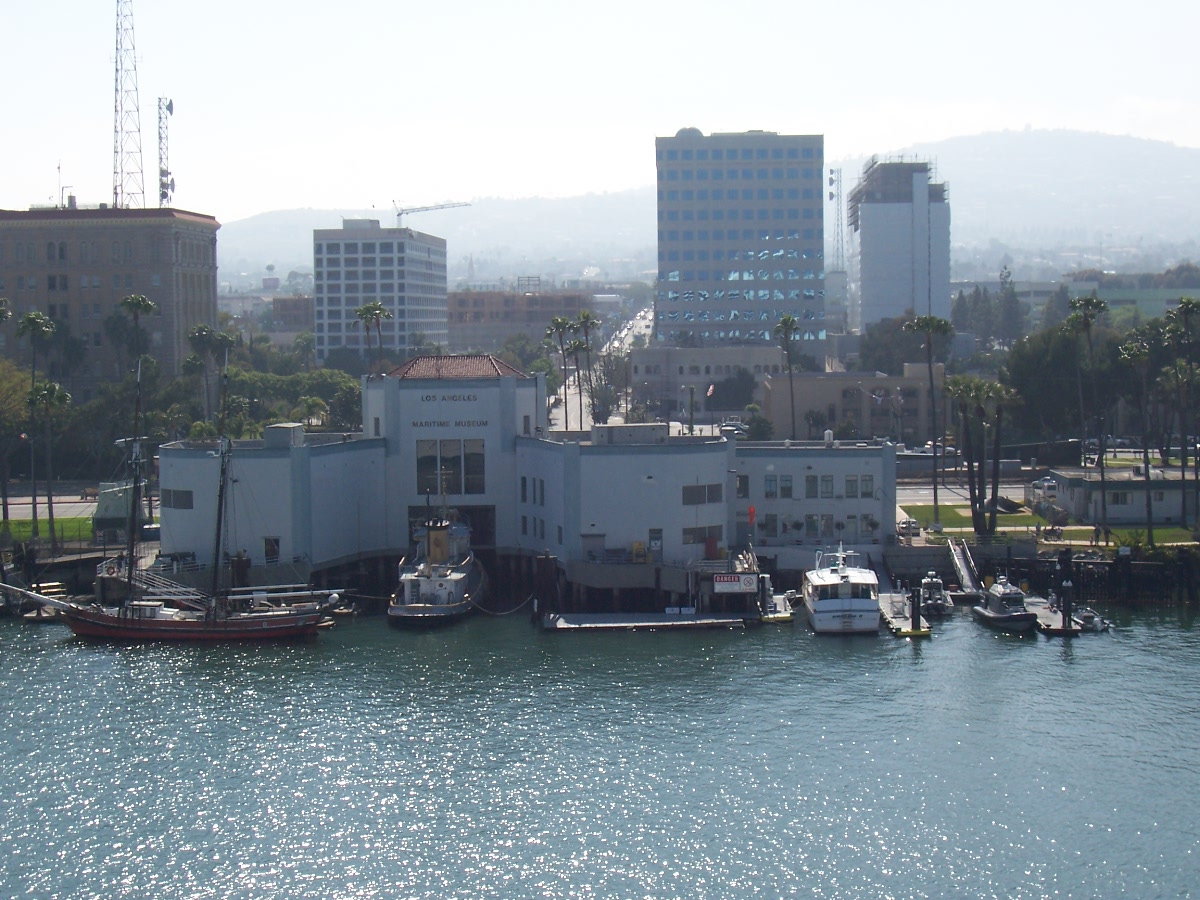
Municipal Ferry Building from the main channel of Los Angeles Harbor.

== See also ==
- List of Los Angeles Historic-Cultural Monuments in the Harbor area
- List of Registered Historic Places in Los Angeles
- National Register of Historic Places in Los Angeles
