= Vanya Quiñones =

American university administrator and neurobiologist

8th President of California State Polytechnic University, Pomona
- Incumbent
- Assumed office July 1, 2026
- Preceded by: Iris S. Levine (interim)

4th President of California State University, Monterey Bay
- In office August 15, 2022 – June 30, 2026
- Preceded by: Eduardo M. Ochoa

Provost and Executive Vice President for Academic Affairs of Pace University
- In office July 2018 – August 2022

Personal details
- Born: Arecibo, Puerto Rico
- Education: University of Puerto Rico (bachelor's, master's); Rutgers University (PhD)
- Scientific career
- Fields: Neurobiology; biopsychology
- Institutions: Hunter College; Pace University
- Thesis: Characterization of a mouse hypothalamic cell line immortalized with a temperature-sensitive variant of the large T antigen of the simian virus 40 (1992)
- Doctoral advisor: Herbert Geller

Vanya Quiñones is an American neurobiologist and academic administrator who has served as the eighth president of California State Polytechnic University, Pomona since July 2026. She previously served as the fourth president of California State University, Monterey Bay from 2022 to 2026 and as provost and executive vice president for academic affairs at Pace University from 2018 to 2022. She is the first Latina to lead Cal Poly Pomona.

== Early life and education ==
Quiñones was born in Arecibo, Puerto Rico, and grew up on her family's dairy farm. She earned a bachelor's degree in biology and a master's degree in cell biology from the University of Puerto Rico, followed by a doctorate in neurobiology and physiology from Rutgers University.

== Career ==
Quiñones spent 21 years at Hunter College, where she was an assistant, associate and full professor of psychology. She later chaired the psychology department and served as associate provost for student success and retention.

In July 2018, she became provost and executive vice president for academic affairs at Pace University, serving until August 2022. She also held the rank of professor of psychology.

The California State University Board of Trustees appointed Quiñones the fourth president of California State University, Monterey Bay, and she began the role on August 15, 2022. During her presidency, the university recorded a 16 percent year-over-year enrollment increase in the 2023–24 academic year, the largest increase in the California State University system that year.

In March 2026, the CSU Board of Trustees appointed Quiñones president of California State Polytechnic University, Pomona. She took office on July 1, succeeding interim president Iris S. Levine and becoming the university's eighth president and its first Latina president.

== Research ==
Quiñones's research has examined neurobiological and hormonal factors associated with sex differences in responses to cocaine and persistent pain. Her California State University biography states that she has published more than 70 peer-reviewed articles.
