= List of San Diego State University fraternities and sororities =

The following article is a list of San Diego State University fraternities and sororities, as well as some background history. Greek life at San Diego State University (SDSU) has an extensive history dating back nearly a century and has played an influential role in the university's development over time. Today it encompasses more than forty active chapters of social and culturally-based fraternities and sororities recognized by the university, each represented through one of four governing councils. Honors, service and professional Greek-letter societies also exist and are recognized student organizations at SDSU, though they operate independently of the Office of Fraternity & Sorority Life.

== History ==
The first fraternity on campus was the local Epsilon Eta, which formed on October 25, 1921. The group maintained strict rules for its members and limited the chapter to twenty male students. The first local sorority, known as Shen Yo, was also established in 1921. By the end of the decade there were six other fraternities and eight sororities. The fraternities and sororities were all local and did not attain national affiliations until after World War II except Alpha Sigma Alpha sorority, chartered in 1932.

On October 10, 1924, the Inter-Fraternity Council (IFC) was founded. The IFC consisted of the nine sororities and the two fraternities that were then on campus. The purpose of IFC was stated as "boosting a high scholarship standard among the members of the fraternal organizations, and of cooperating with the faculty in all matters which lead to the success of the College." The IFC published the grade point averages of fraternities and sororities at the end of each semester, which stimulated a competition for scholastic standing that continues today. On a 3.0 scale, the average GPA (grade point average) for all students at the time was 1.49. For fraternity members, it was 1.35 and for sorority members, it was 1.47. After a couple of years of the co-educational governing organization, the sororities split from the IFC to create their organization, the Inter-Sorority Council, which later became the College Panhellenic Association.

By the mid-1930s, there were eight fraternities and eleven sororities on campus. The campus Greek community expanded to fifteen fraternities and twelve sororities in the 1940s. The post-World War II period saw a frenzy to "go national" among the fraternities and sororities. Between 1947 and 1951, five national fraternities colonized new chapters at SDSU and an additional nine formed chapters through absorbing existing local fraternities on campus. Theta Chi became the first fraternity on campus affiliated with a national organization in 1947. Alpha Xi Delta kickstarted a similar trend for sororities upon chartering in 1949, with nine other national sororities following suit by absorbing the remaining nine local sororities. In 1951, Kappa Alpha Psi fraternity chartered on campus, becoming San Diego State's first African-American Greek organization.

The arrival of national fraternities began the trend of Greek organizations acquiring property for chapter houses. Delta Sigma Phi became the first fraternity to own a chapter house, with Kappa Delta becoming the first sorority to acquire a house shortly thereafter in 1952. The 1950s was a period of steady increase of membership in the Greek community, coinciding with the gradual increase in undergraduate enrollment at the university.

The emergence of the counterculture phenomenon of the late 1960s and early 1970s saw interest in fraternities and sororities decline and the Greek community population dwindled to below 700, with several organizations closing. On April 6, 1978, the Gamma Phi Beta sorority hired a plane to drop marshmallows on fraternity houses during Derby Week, a philanthropy event among the Greek community hosted by the Sigma Chi fraternity. The plane crashed near Peterson Gym on the west side of campus, injuring four students aboard.

In 1983, after a USA Today article reported that SDSU Greeks' GPAs were below the campus average, SDSU tightened restrictions and supervision, and by 1989 grades had increased to slightly above the university average. The Greek system gradually began to grow again in the late seventies following the close of the Vietnam War before spiking in the 1980s, reaching a peak of upwards of 2,900 members in 1988. At this point, there were twenty fraternities and thirteen sororities officially affiliated with the Interfraternity Council and College Panhellenic Association, respectively, as well as six additional independent fraternities and sororities. This made it one of the largest fraternity and sorority systems in the western United States.

The 1990s were a less prosperous time for social fraternities and sororities at the university than the previous decade. A fiscal crisis in California early in the decade severely impacted the California State University system, and SDSU was deeply impacted by budget cuts. A significant decline in enrollment at the university resulted. Several organizations were closed due to operational and conduct issues. Despite the turmoil, the Greek community still experienced substantial growth during the 1990s, though this time it centered primarily around the establishment of numerous culturally-based fraternities and sororities. This led to the establishment of SDSU's fourth Greek governing council, the United Sorority and Fraternity Council on September 24, 1997.

The SDSU Foundation's development of Fraternity Row in 2002, where eight fraternities moved into newly-constructed chapter houses in a 1.4-acre complex adjacent to the newly-constructed Cox Arena (now Viejas Arena). The complex consists of eight free-standing, two-story chapter houses with a private courtyard. The complex provides 61 two and three-bedroom apartment units that overlook the courtyards. The Foundation planned to also construct Sorority Row, a similar project with five free-standing chapter houses, following the completion of Fraternity Row. However, the project was abandoned in 2006 after the Foundation declared the project financially infeasible, citing escalating construction material costs and a lack of commitment from sororities.

In May 2008, the university community was shaken by an investigation into illegal drug use in the college area. Dozens of individuals were arrested in Operation Sudden Fall, including several students who were members of fraternities. Between the spring of 2008 and the spring of 2010, the Interfraternity Council saw its membership drop from sixteen chapters down to just nine, with seven chapters closing during this period all over a variety of misconduct issues. Since this time, the Greek community has experienced steady growth, coinciding with the growth of the university, a renewed interest in Greek life, and increased investment and involvement by alumni and administrators in educational programs for Greek members and organizations.

Today there are a total of more than forty fraternities and sororities at San Diego State University, including both general and culturally-based organizations, represented through one of the four governing councils.

== College Panhellenic Association (CPA) ==
The College Panhellenic Association is the governing body of all National Panhellenic Conference general social sororities on campus. According to its website, "the College Panhellenic Association aims to develop and maintain women's fraternity life and interfraternity relations at high levels of accomplishment".

=== Active chapters ===
Organization	Letters	Chapter	Charter date	Nickname(s)
Alpha Chi Omega	ΑΧΩ	Gamma Nu (ΓΝ)	November 18, 1950* (Note: Alpha Chi Omega: Origin 1924 – 1950 as Sigma Pi Theta Charter Nov. 18, 1950 – Present)	AChiO; Alpha Chi
Alpha Gamma Delta	ΑΓΔ	Delta Eta (ΔΗ)	October 1, 1949* (Note: Alpha Gamma Delta: Origin 1924 – 1949 as Gamma Phi Zeta Charter Oct. 1, 1949 – 1991 Charter 2013 – Present)	AGD; Alpha Gam
Alpha Phi	ΑΦ	Gamma Alpha (ΓΑ)	October 1, 1949* (Note: Alpha Phi: Origin 1924 – 1949 as Phi Kappa Gamma Charter Oct. 1, 1949 – Present)	A-Phi
Chi Omega	ΧΩ	Gamma Delta (ΓΔ)	November 17, 1950* (Note: Chi Omega: Origin 1921 – 1950 as Shen Yo Charter Nov. 17, 1950 – 1995 Charter 2024 – Present)	ChiO
Delta Gamma	ΔΓ	Epsilon Sigma (ΕΣ)	March 16, 1985 (Note: Delta Gamma: Charter Mar. 16, 1985 – Present)	DG
Gamma Phi Beta	ΓΦΒ	Beta Lambda (ΒΛ)	October 15, 1949* (Note: Gamma Phi Beta: Origin 1923 – 1949 as Kappa Theta Charter Oct. 15, 1949 – Present)	G-Phi; Gamma Phi
Kappa Alpha Theta	ΚΑΘ	Gamma Sigma (ΓΣ)	January 26, 1951* (Note: Kappa Alpha Theta: Origin 1929 – 1951 as Chi Theta Charter Jan. 26, 1951 – 2011 Charter 2016 – Present)	Theta
Kappa Delta	ΚΔ	Beta Rho (ΒΡ)	May 28, 1949* (Note: Kappa Delta: Origin 1931 – 1949 as Epsilon Pi Theta Charter May 28, 1949 – Present)	KD
Pi Beta Phi	ΠΒΦ	California Epsilon (CA Ε)	September 1, 1949* (Note: Pi Beta Phi: Origin 1925 – 1949 as Phi Sigma Nu Charter Sep. 1, 1949 – Present)	Pi Phi

* indicates original charter date with national organization, does not reflect origin as previously local sorority (see below)

=== Historical list of chapters ===
Organization	Letters	Chapter	Charter date	Nickname(s)	Latest activity
Alpha Chi Omega	ΑΧΩ	Gamma Nu (ΓΝ)	November 18, 1950*	AChiO; Alpha Chi	Active
Alpha Delta Pi	ΑΔΠ	Eta Sigma (ΗΣ)	February 17, 1991 (Note: Alpha Delta Pi: Charter Feb. 17, 1991 – 2005)	ADPi	Spring 2005
Alpha Epsilon Phi	ΑΕΦ	Epsilon Nu (ΕΝ)	March 8, 1964 (Note: Alpha Epsilon Phi: Charter Mar. 8, 1964 – 1969 Charter 2006 – 2014)	AEPhi	2014
Alpha Gamma Delta	ΑΓΔ	Delta Eta (ΔΗ)	October 1, 1949*	AGD; Alpha Gam	Active
Alpha Phi	ΑΦ	Gamma Alpha (ΓΑ)	October 1, 1949*	A-Phi	Active
Alpha Sigma Alpha	ΑΣΑ	Omega Omega (ΩΩ)	January 16, 1932 (Note: Alpha Sigma Alpha: Charter Jan. 16, 1932 – 1938)	ASA	1938
Alpha Xi Delta	ΑΞΔ	Gamma Alpha (ΓΑ)	January 15, 1949* (Note: Alpha Xi Delta: Origin 1923 – 1949 as Delta Chi Phi Charter Jan. 15, 1949 – 1971 Charter 1975 – 1998)	AZD; Alpha Xi	1998
Chi Omega	ΧΩ	Gamma Delta (ΓΔ)	November 17, 1950*	ChiO	Active
Delta Gamma	ΔΓ	Epsilon Sigma (ΕΣ)	March 16, 1985	DG	Active
Delta Zeta	ΔΖ	Gamma Omicron (ΓΟ)	November 19, 1949* (Note: Delta Zeta: Origin 1939 – 1949 as Alpha Chi Sigma Charter Nov. 19, 1949 – 1995 Charter 2007 – 2022)	DZ	Fall 2022
Gamma Phi Beta	ΓΦΒ	Beta Lambda (ΒΛ)	October 15, 1949*	GPhi; Gamma Phi	Active
Kappa Alpha Theta	ΚΑΘ	Gamma Sigma (ΓΣ)	January 26, 1951*	Theta	Active
Kappa Delta	ΚΔ	Beta Rho (ΒΡ)	May 28, 1949*	KD	Active
Pi Beta Phi	ΠΒΦ	California Epsilon (CA Ε)	September 1, 1949*	Pi Phi	Active
Sigma Kappa	ΣΚ	Beta Psi (ΒΨ)	February 18, 1950* (Note: Sigma Kappa: Origin 1924 – 1950 as Tau Zeta Rho Charter Feb. 18, 1950 – 2007)	SK	2007

* indicates original charter date with national organization, does not reflect origin as previously local sorority (see below)

=== Local sorority origins ===
Several sororities originated locally before later affiliating with national organizations:

- Alpha Chi Omega, Gamma Nu chapter originated as Sigma Pi Theta (ΣΠΘ) in 1924
- Alpha Gamma Delta, Delta Eta chapter originated as Gamma Phi Zeta (ΓΦΖ) in 1924
- Alpha Phi, Gamma Alpha chapter originated as Phi Kappa Gamma (ΦΚΓ) in 1924
- Alpha Xi Delta, Gamma Alpha chapter originated as Delta Chi Phi (ΔΧΦ) in 1923
- Chi Omega, Gamma Delta chapter originated as Shen Yo in 1921
- Delta Zeta, Gamma Omicron chapter originated as Alpha Sigma Chi (ΑΣΧ) in 1939
- Gamma Phi Beta, Beta Lambda chapter originated as Kappa Theta (ΚΘ) in 1923
- Kappa Alpha Theta, Gamma Sigma chapter originated as Chi Theta (ΧΘ) in 1929
- Kappa Delta, Beta Rho chapter originated as Epsilon Pi Theta (ΕΠΘ) in 1931
- Pi Beta Phi, California Epsilon chapter originated as Phi Sigma Nu (ΦΣΝ) in 1925
- Sigma Kappa, Beta Psi chapter originated as Tau Zeta Rho (TZP) in 1924

== Interfraternity Council (IFC) ==
The Interfraternity Council (IFC) is the governing body of general social fraternities on the San Diego State campus. Most of its member organizations belong to the North American Interfraternity Conference. The Interfraternity Council was formed on October 10, 1924, initially encompassing both fraternities and sororities. The purpose of the organization was stated to be "boosting a high scholarship standard among the members of the fraternal organizations, and of cooperating with the faculty in all matters which lead to the success of the College".

=== Active chapters ===
Organization	Letters	Chapter	Charter date	Nickname(s)
Alpha Epsilon Pi	ΑΕΠ	Sigma Delta (ΣΔ)	December 7, 1970 (Note: Alpha Epsilon Pi: Expansion 1968, Charter Dec. 7, 1970 – 1972 Charter 1983 – 1990 Charter 2000 – Present)	AEPi
Alpha Sigma Phi	ΑΣΦ	Lambda Epsilon (ΛΕ)	provisional chapter (Note: Alpha Sigma Phi: Expansion Fall 2025)	Alpha Sig; A-Sig
Beta Theta Pi	ΒΘΠ	Epsilon Beta (ΕΒ)	February 5, 1984 (Note: Beta Theta Pi: Expansion 1981, Charter Feb. 5, 1984 – 2000 Expansion Fall 2022, Charter 2025 – Present)	Beta
Delta Chi	ΔΧ	San Diego State	March 28, 1969 (Note: Delta Chi: Expansion 1965, Charter Mar. 28, 1969 – 1996 Expansion Spring 2020, Charter 2021 – Present)	D-Chi
Delta Sigma Phi	ΔΣΦ	Gamma Alpha (ΓΑ)	November 14, 1948 (Note: Delta Sigma Phi: Charter Nov. 14, 1948 – 1998 Charter 1999 – 2008 Expansion Fall 2013, Charter 2014 Expansion Fall 2017, Charter 2019 – Present)	Delta Sig; D-Sig
Delta Upsilon	ΔΥ	San Diego State	May 11, 1966 (Note: Delta Upsilon: Expansion 1966, Charter May 11, 1968 – 1994 Expansion Fall 1999, Charter November 4, 2000 – Present)	DU
Kappa Alpha Order	ΚΑ	Gamma Iota (ΓΙ)	October 15, 1950* (Note: Kappa Alpha Order: Origin 1926 – 1950 as Omega Xi Charter Oct. 15, 1950 – 1962 Expansion 1991, Charter 1993 – 2009 Expansion Spring 2013, Charter November 1, 2014 – Present)	KA; Kappa Alpha
Phi Kappa Tau	ΦΚΤ	Beta Nu (ΒΝ)	January 7, 1950* (Note: Phi Kappa Tau: Origin June 6, 1926 – 1950 as Kappa Phi Sigma Charter Jan. 7, 1950 – 1954 Expansion Fall 2023)	Phi Tau
Pi Kappa Phi	ΠΚΦ	provisional chapter (Note: Pi Kappa Phi: Expansion Fall 2026)		Pi Kapp
Sigma Chi	ΣΧ	Delta Xi (ΔΞ)	January 8, 1949* (Note: Sigma Chi: Origin 1925 – 1949 as Phi Lambda Xi Charter Jan. 8, 1949 – 2013 Expansion Spring 2017, Charter 2021 – Present)	Sig Chi
Sigma Nu	ΣΝ	Eta Kappa (ΗΚ)	February 1, 1963 (Note: Sigma Nu: Expansion 1962, Charter Feb. 1, 1963 – 2012 Expansion 2016 – 2018 Expansion Fall 2024, Charter 2025 – Present)	Sig Nu; Snu
Tau Kappa Epsilon	ΤΚΕ	Gamma Lambda (ΓΛ)	May 19, 1950* (Note: Tau Kappa Epsilon: Origin 1926 – 1950 as Sigma Lambda Charter May 19, 1950 – 1992 Charter 1995 – 2004 (unaffiliated 2000 – 2004) Expansion Fall 2020, Charter 2022 – Present)	TKE; Teke
Zeta Beta Tau	ΖΒΤ	Beta Lambda (ΒΛ)	May 20, 1951 (Note: Zeta Beta Tau: Expansion 1949, Charter May 20, 1951 – 1972 Expansion 1986, Charter 1988 – 2016, 2017 – Present)	ZBT
Zeta Psi	ΖΨ	provisional chapter (Note: Zeta Psi: Expansion Fall 2026)		Zete

* indicates original charter date with the national organization, does not reflect origin as a previously local fraternity (see below)

=== Historical list of chapters ===
Organization	Letters	Chapter	Charter date	Nickname(s)	Latest activity
Alpha Epsilon Pi	ΑΕΠ	Sigma Delta (ΣΔ)	December 7, 1970	AEPi	Active
Alpha Sigma Phi	ΑΣΦ	Lambda Epsilon (ΛΕ)	provisional chapter	Alpha Sig; A-Sig	Active (provisional)
Alpha Tau Omega	ΑΤΩ	Epsilon Psi (ΕΨ)	November 4, 1950* (Note: Alpha Tau Omega: Origin Nov. 6, 1926 – 1947 as Tau Delta Chi Expansion Fall 1947, Charter Nov. 4, 1950 – 1994)	ATO	Fall 1994
Beta Theta Pi	ΒΘΠ	Epsilon Beta (ΕΒ)	February 5, 1984	Beta	Active
Delta Chi	ΔΧ	San Diego State	March 28, 1969	D-Chi	Active
Delta Sigma Phi	ΔΣΦ	Gamma Alpha (ΓΑ)	November 14, 1948	Delta Sig; D-Sig	Active
Delta Upsilon	ΔΥ	San Diego State	May 11, 1966	DU	Active
Kappa Alpha Order	ΚΑ	Gamma Iota (ΓΙ)	October 15, 1950*	KA; Kappa Alpha	Active
Kappa Sigma	ΚΣ	Epsilon Iota (ΕΙ)	December 6, 1947* (Note: Kappa Sigma: Origin 1922 – 1947 as Eta Omega Delta Charter Dec. 6, 1947 – 2002 Expansion 2003, Charter 2004 – 2010 Expansion 2012, Charter 2013 – 2022 (unaffiliated 2020 – 2022))	Kappa Sig; K-Sig	Fall 2022
Lambda Chi Alpha	ΛΧΑ	Zeta Pi (ΖΠ)	January 10, 1948 (Note: Lambda Chi Alpha: Expansion 1947, Charter Jan. 10, 1948 – 1995 Expansion 2004, Charter 2005 – 2008)	Lambda	Spring 2008
Phi Delta Theta	ΦΔΘ	California Pi (CA Π)	April 22, 1989 (Note: Phi Delta Theta: Expansion 1988, Charter Apr. 22, 1989 – 1995 Expansion Fall 2009, Charter April 10, 2010 – 2026)	Phi Delt	Spring 2026
Phi Gamma Delta	FIJI / ΦΓΔ	Sigma Delta (ΣΔ)	November 1, 1986 (Note: Phi Gamma Delta: Expansion 1984, Charter Nov. 1, 1986 – 1995 Expansion 2011, Charter 2013 – 2020)	Fiji	Spring 2020
Phi Kappa Psi	ΦΚΨ	California Lambda (CA Λ)	February 17, 1996 (Note: Phi Kappa Psi: Expansion Fall 1993, Charter Feb. 17, 1996 – 2025)	Phi Psi	Spring 2025
Phi Kappa Tau	ΦΚΤ	Beta Nu (ΒΝ)	January 7, 1950*	Phi Tau	Active (provisional)
Phi Kappa Theta	ΦΚΘ	California Phi Iota (CA ΦΙ)	November 11, 1995 (Note: Phi Kappa Theta: Expansion 1992, Charter Nov. 11, 1995 – 2003, 2004 – 2017)	Phi Kap	Fall 2017
Phi Sigma Kappa	ΦΣΚ	Rho Triton (Ρ^{T})	April 30, 1949 (Note: Phi Sigma Kappa: Expansion 1948, Charter Apr. 30, 1949 – 1959)	Phi Sig	1959
Pi Kappa Alpha	ΠΚΑ	Delta Kappa (ΔΚ)	November 27, 1948* (Note: Pi Kappa Alpha: Origin 1928 – 1948 as Delta Pi Beta Charter Nov. 27, 1948 – 1972 Charter 1974 – 1987 Expansion Fall 2014, Charter 2016 – 2024)	Pike	Spring 2024
Pi Kappa Phi	ΠΚΦ	provisional chapter		Pi Kapp	Active (provisional)
Sigma Alpha Epsilon	ΣΑΕ	California Theta (CA Θ)	October 8, 1949* (Note: Sigma Alpha Epsilon: Origin Oct. 7, 1921 – 1949 as Epsilon Eta Charter Oct. 8, 1949 – 1991 Expansion 1994, Charter 1999 – 2024)	SAE	Fall 2024
Sigma Alpha Mu	ΣΑΜ	Gamma Nu (ΓΝ)	January 23, 1983 (Note: Sigma Alpha Mu: Expansion 1981, Charter Jan. 23, 1983 – 1984 Charter 1989 – 2009)	Sammy	Fall 2009
Sigma Chi	ΣΧ	Delta Xi (ΔΞ)	January 8, 1949*	Sig Chi	Active
Sigma Nu	ΣΝ	Eta Kappa (ΗΚ)	February 1, 1963	Sig Nu, Snu	Active
Sigma Phi Epsilon	ΣΦΕ	California Delta (CA Δ)	November 16, 1947* (Note: Sigma Phi Epsilon: Origin January 31, 1940 – 1947 as Sigma Delta Epsilon Charter Nov. 16, 1947 – 1997 Expansion 2000, Charter 2004 – 2019, 2021 – 2024)	SigEp	Fall 2024
Sigma Pi	ΣΠ	Alpha Omega (ΑΩ)	May 14, 1949 (Note: Sigma Pi: Expansion 1948, Charter May 14, 1949 – 1961 Expansion 1962, Charter 1963 – 1973 Expansion 1975, Charter 1976 – 1995 Expansion 1998, Charter 2001 – 2008)	Sig Pi	Spring 2008
Tau Kappa Epsilon	ΤΚΕ	Gamma Lambda (ΓΛ)	May 19, 1950*	TKE; Teke	Active
Theta Chi	ΘΧ	Gamma Theta (ΓΘ)	November 8, 1947 (Note: Theta Chi: Charter Nov. 8, 1947 – 2008 Expansion 2012, Charter 2013 – 2019)		Fall 2019
Zeta Beta Tau	ΖΒΤ	Beta Lambda (ΒΛ)	May 20, 1951	ZBT	Active
Zeta Psi	ΖΨ	provisional chapter		Zete	Active (provisional)

* indicates original charter date with the national organization, does not reflect origin as a previously local fraternity (see below)

=== Local fraternity origins ===
Several fraternities originated locally before later affiliating with national organizations:

- Alpha Tau Omega, Epsilon Psi chapter originated as Tau Delta Chi (ΤΔΧ) in 1926
- Kappa Alpha Order, Gamma Iota chapter originated as Omega Xi (ΩΞ) in 1926
- Kappa Sigma, Epsilon Iota chapter originated as Eta Omega Delta (ΗΩΔ) in 1922
- Phi Kappa Tau, Beta Nu chapter originated as Kappa Phi Sigma (ΚΦΣ) in 1926
- Pi Kappa Alpha, Delta Kappa chapter originated as Delta Pi Beta (ΔΠΒ) in 1928
- Sigma Alpha Epsilon, California Theta chapter originated as Epsilon Eta (ΕΗ) in 1921
- Sigma Chi, Delta Xi chapter originated as Phi Lambda Xi (ΦΛΞ) in 1925
- Sigma Phi Epsilon, California Delta chapter originated as Sigma Delta Epsilon (ΣΔΕ) in 1940
- Tau Kappa Epsilon, Gamma Lambda chapter originated as Sigma Lambda (ΣΛ) in 1926

== National Pan-Hellenic Council (NPHC) ==
The National Pan-Hellenic Council (NPHC) is the collaborative organization of historically African American, international Greek lettered fraternities and sororities at San Diego State. Its member organizations are members of the national council of the same name, the National Pan-Hellenic Council. Its mission statement is "Unanimity within the council to maintain an influential and puissant presence by member organizations through programs, community service, and camaraderie for the betterment of the communities in which we serve".

=== Fraternities ===
Organization	Letters	Chapter	Charter Date
Alpha Phi Alpha	ΑΦΑ	Eta Sigma (ΗΣ)	September 9, 1972
Kappa Alpha Psi	ΚΑΨ	Delta Epsilon (ΔΕ)	March 26, 1951
Omega Psi Phi	ΩΨΦ	Pi Mu (ΠΜ)	August 14, 1976
Phi Beta Sigma	ΦΒΣ	Lambda Iota (ΛΙ)	January 27, 1979

=== Sororities ===
Organization	Letters	Chapter	Charter Date
Alpha Kappa Alpha	ΑΚΑ	Mu Iota (ΜΙ)	May 23, 1978
Delta Sigma Theta	ΔΣΘ	Nu Epsilon (ΝΕ)	May 7, 1977
Sigma Gamma Rho	ΣΓΡ	Delta Gamma (ΔΓ)	June 5, 1970
Zeta Phi Beta	ΖΦΒ	Xi Kappa (ΞΚ)	October 18, 1980

== United Sorority and Fraternity Council (USFC) ==
The United Sorority and Fraternity Council (USFC) was founded on the campus of San Diego State University on September 24, 1997. The council is composed of Asian/Pacific Islander-interest, Latino/Latina-interest, and multicultural-based fraternities and sororities. The council's mission is "to provide a governing council for its respective organizations and promote unity and respect amongst themselves, the university, and the community.

=== Active chapters ===
==== Fraternities ====
Organization	Letters	Chapter	Charter Date	Interest
Alpha Psi Rho	ΑΨΡ	Alpha (Α)	March 1, 2000	Asian/Pacific Islander
Gamma Zeta Alpha	ΓΖΑ	Zeta (Ζ)	May 31, 1997	Latino
Nu Alpha Kappa	ΝΑΚ	Beta (Β)	February 10, 1990	Latino
Sigma Lambda Beta	ΣΛΒ	Psi Gamma (ΨΓ)	February 27, 2010	Latino

==== Sororities ====
Organization	Letters	Chapter	Charter Date	Interest
Alpha Phi Gamma	ΑΦΓ	Gamma (Γ)	April 15, 1998	Asian/Pacific Islander
Alpha Pi Sigma	ΑΠΣ	Alpha (Α)	March 10, 1990	Latina
Delta Sigma Psi	ΔΣΨ	Alpha (Α)	December 12, 1998	Asian/Pacific Islander
Lambda Theta Alpha	ΛΘΑ	Gamma Psi (ΓΨ)	January 30, 2005	Latina
Lambda Sigma Gamma	ΛΣΓ	Kappa (Κ)	April 24, 1994	Multicultural
Sigma Alpha Zeta	ΣΑΖ	Delta (Δ)	1997	Multicultural
Sigma Lambda Gamma	ΣΛΓ	Iota Gamma (ΙΓ)	January 4, 2005	Latina
Sigma Phi Omega	ΣΦΩ	Delta (Δ)	December 18, 1991	Asian/Pacific Islander
Sigma Theta Psi	ΣΘΨ	Alpha (Α)	May 1, 1991	Multicultural
Upsilon Kappa Delta	ΥΚΔ	Beta (Β)	April 24, 1998	Multicultural

=== Historical list of chapters ===
==== Fraternities ====
Organization	Letters	Chapter	Charter Date	Interest	Status
Alpha Psi Rho	ΑΨΡ	Alpha (Α)	March 1, 2000	Asian/Pacific Islander	Active
Beta Gamma Nu	ΒΓΝ	Epsilon (Ε)	February 11, 2011	Multicultural	Dormant
Delta Lambda Phi	ΔΛΦ	Alpha Delta (ΑΔ)	1992	Pride	Dormant
Gamma Zeta Alpha	ΓΖΑ	Zeta (Ζ)	May 31, 1997	Latino	Active
Lambda Theta Phi	ΛΘΦ	Delta Gamma (ΔΓ)	March 26, 2014	Latino	Dormant
Nu Alpha Kappa	ΝΑΚ	Beta (Β)	February 10, 1990	Latino	Active
Sigma Lambda Beta	ΣΛΒ	Psi Gamma (ΨΓ)	February 27, 2010	Latino	Active

==== Sororities ====
Organization	Letters	Chapter	Charter Date	Interest	Status
Alpha Phi Gamma	ΑΦΓ	Gamma (Γ)	April 15, 1998	Asian/Pacific Islander	Active
Alpha Pi Sigma	ΑΠΣ	Alpha (Α)	March 10, 1990	Latina	Active
Delta Sigma Psi	ΔΣΨ	Alpha (Α)	December 12, 1998	Asian/Pacific Islander	Active
Gamma Rho Lambda	ΓΡΛ	Beta (Β)	2005	Pride	Dormant
Lambda Theta Alpha	ΛΘΑ	Gamma Psi (ΓΨ)	January 30, 2005	Latina	Active
Lambda Sigma Gamma	ΛΣΓ	Kappa (Κ)	April 24, 1994	Multicultural	Active
Sigma Alpha Zeta	ΣΑΖ	Delta (Δ)	1997	Multicultural	Active
Sigma Lambda Gamma	ΣΛΓ	Iota Gamma (ΙΓ)	January 4, 2005	Latina	Active
Sigma Phi Omega	ΣΦΩ	Delta (Δ)	December 18, 1991	Asian/Pacific Islander	Active
Sigma Theta Psi	ΣΘΨ	Alpha (Α)	May 1, 1991	Multicultural	Active
Upsilon Kappa Delta	ΥΚΔ	Beta (Β)	April 24, 1998	Multicultural	Active

== Auxiliary Organizations ==
- FratMANers (Fraternity Men Against Negative Environments & Rape Situations)
- Greek Life Activities Board (GLAB) – Coordination board for activities within the Greek community
- Order of Omega – Affiliate of the national Order of Omega, recognizing "fraternity men and women who have attained a high standard of leadership in inter-fraternity activities."
- Rho Lambda – Leadership recognition society for sorority women from all-female/co-ed councils
- Sisster – Sororities Invested in Survivor Support, Training, and Ending Rape culture

== Notable alumni ==
Many notable alumni of San Diego State University were members of fraternities and sororities during their undergraduate years. Some are listed below.

- John Baldessari (Sigma Chi) – conceptual artist
- Printz Board (Delta Sigma Phi) – record producer, singer, and songwriter best known for work with the Black Eyed Peas
- Phil Buckman (Theta Chi) – actor and musician
- Clair Burgener (Sigma Chi) – member of the U.S. House of Representatives (1973–1983)
- Robert Cardenas (Sigma Chi as Phi Lambda Xi) – Brigadier general of the United States Air Force (1968–1973)
- Will Demps (Sigma Pi) – NFL professional football player (2002–2008)
- Fred Dryer (Tau Kappa Epsilon) – NFL professional football player (1969–1981); actor known best for a lead role on Hunter
- Chris Ello (Delta Chi) – sports broadcaster and radio personality
- Brett Faryniarz (Tau Kappa Epsilon) – NFL professional football player (1988–1995)
- Kevin Faulconer (Kappa Sigma) – 36th mayor of San Diego (2014–2020)
- Joe Gibbs (Sigma Chi) – NFL professional football coach (1973–1992, 2004–2007), three-time Super Bowl champion head coach, Pro Football Hall of Fame member, auto racing owner of Joe Gibbs Racing, five-time NASCAR Cup Series champion, NASCAR Hall of Fame member
- Bob Goen (Sigma Alpha Epsilon) – television personality and gameshow host, best known for his role on Entertainment Tonight
- Robert B. Johnston (Pi Kappa Alpha) – United States Marine Corps lieutenant general
- Robert E. Kennedy (Alpha Tau Omega as Tau Delta Chi) – seventh president of California Polytechnic State University, San Luis Obispo (1967–1979), namesake of Cal Poly campus library
- Andrew Lauer (Tau Kappa Epsilon) – documentary filmmaker and actor, known for Caroline in the City
- Jason Lewis (Delta Upsilon) – actor, best known for roles on Sex and the City and Midnight, Texas
- Art Linkletter (Alpha Tau Omega as Tau Delta Chi) – radio and television personality
- Doug Manchester (Sigma Chi) – real estate developer, businessman
- David McKenna (Sigma Alpha Epsilon) – screenwriter and film producer
- Merrill McPeak (Sigma Chi) – retired 4-star general in the United States Air Force, former acting United States Secretary of the Air Force (1993)
- Al Michaels (Sigma Nu) – television sportscaster (1971–present), five-time Sports Emmy Award winner,
- Sophia A. Nelson (Alpha Kappa Alpha) – author, political strategist, and attorney
- Graig Nettles (Sigma Alpha Epsilon) – MLB professional baseball player (1967–1988), six-time All-Star and two-time World Series champion
- Leon W. Parma (Sigma Chi) – businessman, banker, and former co-owner of the San Diego Padres
- Gregory Peck (Sigma Alpha Epsilon as Epsilon Eta) – actor and five-time Academy Award for Best Actor recipient
- Ralph Pesqueira (Sigma Chi) – entrepreneur and founder of El Indio Mexican Restaurant credited with the invention of the taquito
- Fred Pierce (Beta Theta Pi) – real estate developer and philanthropist
- Jerry Sanders (Sigma Alpha Epsilon) – 34th mayor of San Diego (2005–2012), San Diego Police Department Chief of police (1993–1999)
- Brian Sipe (Kappa Sigma) – NFL professional football player (1974–1983), 1980 NFL MVP
- Scott Slater (Phi Kappa Psi) - founder of Slater's 50/50 restaurant
- Suzy Spafford (Kappa Delta) – cartoonist best known for Suzy's Zoo
- Jimmy Steinfeldt (Sigma Pi) – live-action photographer
- George Sunga (Tau Kappa Epsilon) – television producer known for The Smothers Brothers Comedy Hour, Three's Company, Good Times, The Jeffersons, and All in the Family
- John Clifford Wallace (Sigma Chi) – Senior United States circuit judge of the United States Court of Appeals for the Ninth Circuit
- Russell Weiner (Lambda Chi Alpha) – businessman and former politician, creator of Rockstar energy drink
- Raquel Welch (Alpha Phi) – actress and model known for an extensive television and film career spanning several decades

== Bibliography ==
- Starr, Raymond; Harry Polkinhorn (1995). San Diego State University: A History in Word and Image. San Diego State University Press. ISBN 1-879691-30-2.
- Mallios, Seth (2012). Hail Montezuma! The Hidden Treasures of San Diego State. Montezuma Publishing. ISBN 978-0-7442-5106-7.
