= Sharsheret =

Sharsheret may refer to:

- Sharsheret (organization)
- Sharsheret, Israel, a moshav in Israel
