= Matsui Nursery =

American floristry business

- Type: Private
- Founded: 1969 as Matsui Nursery
- Founder: Andy Matsui
- Headquarters: Salinas, California, US
- Key people: Andy Matsui, Chairman; Teresa Matsui, President, CEO
- Products: Orchids
- Website: www.matsuinursery.com

Matsui Nursery is a California-based producer of potted orchids.

== History ==
Toshikiyo Andy Matsui was born in Japan in 1935. He was raised on a small farm where his family grew starch products. Matsui decided to join a farm program in the U.S. and moved to Mountain View, California in 1961, where he apprenticed in growing chrysanthemums (the national flower of Japan). He moved permanently with his wife and first daughter to California soon thereafter. In 1969 he bought 50 acres of land near Salinas, California building greenhouses for flowers. He grew chrysanthemums, then roses. In 1998 at age 63, Matsui switched to Orchids when stiff competition from other countries arose in traditional flowers. He is now the world's largest potted orchid farmer.

In March 2015, Matsui's daughter Teresa Matsui became the president of Matsui Nursery.

== Operations ==
Matsui Nursery switched from cut flower to potted orchids on a large scale in 1998. Matsui Nursery started the country's first grocery retail program for potted orchids. It grows millions of orchids, with hundreds of varieties, yearly. It is one of the world's largest potted orchid growers.

It takes two to three years for the plants to grow from sprouts to store shelves. Matsui Nursery has about 10 million potted orchids continuously in production in 75 acres of greenhouse. The orchids are shipped across the U.S. and globally.

== Matsui Foundation ==
In 2004 Matsui formed an educational foundation to make grants to students among the company's workforce and their families.

In 2013, the Foundation donated one million dollars to the CSin3 Program, which was developed to allow farm-worker children to attend college and obtain a degree in computer science. The program was developed by CSUMB and Hartnell College. The first class graduated in May 2016 with 22 students. In the process, Salinas hopes to turn into an agricultural technology hub.

On November 2, 2017, Teresa Matsui, on behalf of the Matsui Foundation, made a gift of 215 acres of land north east of Salinas to the local Junior College. This is agricultural land on which strawberries are grown under lease, which generates about $500,000 in annual income, and expires in 2019. The land is valued at $20 Million. This gift is the largest that the Hartnell College Foundation has ever received.
