= Veronica Carmen Ripley =

Twitch Streamer

Veronica Ripley
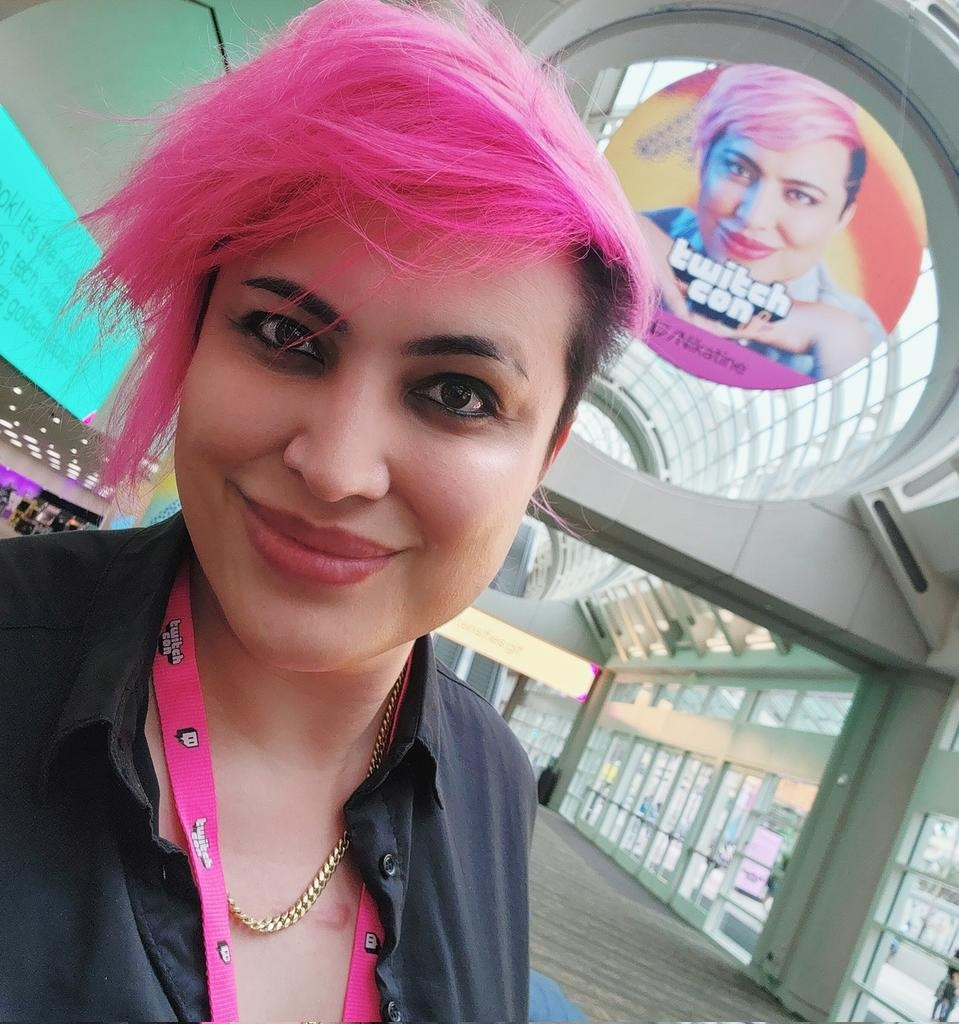
- Nikatine at TwitchCon 2022
- Born: November 22, 1990 (age 35); Monterey, California
- Other names: Nikatine; NikatinePrime
- Occupation: Twitch streamer
- Years active: 2016-Present

Twitch information
- Channel: Nikatine
- Genres: Gaming; political commentary; TTRPG
- Games: GTA RP; Cities: Skylines; Kerbal Space Program; TTRPGs
- Website: nikatine.com

Veronica Carmen Ripley (born November 22, 1990), better known by her online alias Nikatine, is an American streamer and Internet personality. She founded Transmission Gaming, a Discord community for transgender gamers, and currently owns tabletop game publisher Fablescraps.

In 2019, Ripley was inducted into the official Twitch Ambassador program.

== Early life ==
Veronica Ripley was born on November 22, 1990, to a Latina mother and an American father. Born in the Monterey Bay area, she grew up attending theater classes and participating in community theater productions. As a child, Ripley often played Starcraft with her father. She pursued a career in acting, working in casting for a few years, before leaving Hollywood and returning home around early 2013. It was during this time she began her gender transition. After graduating with a Bachelor's degree in Music from CSUMB, she began to play games professionally on the livestreaming platform Twitch.

== Personal life ==
Ripley is transgender and a lesbian. She has cited video games as an escape and as a method of expression for her identity.

== Career ==
Ripley began streaming with Overwatch's release in 2016. She quickly shifted focus toward simulation games such as Kerbal Space Program and Cities: Skylines, and eventually began streaming Grand Theft Auto roleplay. She also does "Just Chatting" streams, where she discusses politics.

In 2016, she founded Transmission Gaming, a community on the instant messaging Discord for transgender gamers to meet and play games together. It has since grown to include a 68-member group of Twitch streamers.

In addition to streaming, Ripley also owns the tabletop game publisher Fablescraps.

== Activism ==
Ripley has been an outspoken critic of Twitch's content tag system, calling for the creation of a transgender tag. According to TechRadar, Ripley was quoted as saying: "I hear this argument a lot, that trans doesn't deserve to be a tag because tags are reserved for content not for identity. But I would posit to you that if I had a podcast, and my podcast was focused on trans issues, wouldn't that make it trans content?" To circumvent this issue, she encouraged other transgender streamers to use a keycap making tag, in an attempt to create a safe space. In May 2021, Twitch introduced the "Trans" tag.

Ripley has done several charity streams, both independently and with Transmission Gaming, raising thousands of dollars for LGBTQ charities.
