= Marilyn Beck =

American syndicated columnist and author

- Beck in 1975
- Born: Hanna Marilyn Mohr; December 17, 1928; Chicago, Illinois, U.S.A.
- Died: May 31, 2014 (aged 85); Oceanside, California, U.S.A.
- Education: University of Southern California
- Occupations: Journalist; TV interviewer/commentator
- Years active: 1961 – 2014
- Spouses: Roger Beck (divorced) Arthur Levine (m. 1980)
- Children: Mark E. Beck, Andee Beck Althoff

Marilyn Beck (December 17, 1928 – May 31, 2014) was a syndicated Hollywood columnist and author.

== Career ==
Beck began working as a newspaper and magazine writer in the early 1960s. One of her first interviews was with the "Red Light Bandit" serial rapist Caryl Chessman on San Quentin's death row, shortly before he was executed. She wrote her first column for Bell McClure syndicate in 1967. Three years later, she was named Sheilah Graham's successor for the North American Newspaper Alliance.

Beck's Hollywood column moved to the New York Times Special Features in 1972 as she reported on the doings of celebrities. She became affiliated with Tribune Media Services in 1980, and a decade later moved to Creators Syndicate.

Throughout the 1970s and 1980s, her column was seen in papers with a combined readership upwards of 25 million, maintaining a large print readership through the evolving Internet era of the '90s and '00s. Beck established an early-day web presence in the mid-'80s, via Prodigy and CompuServe, and later on E! Online and AOL. She authored the Grapevine column in TV Guide from 1989 to 1992.

Beck began her partnership with newspaper and magazine writer Stacy Jenel Smith, a former protégé, in 1990. The column became Beck/Smith Hollywood Exclusive. Among Beck/Smith's innovations (under the auspices of CompuServe and Entertainment Drive) was live online reporting with user questions being relayed to winners at the Academy Awards, beginning at the 1994 Oscars show. They did regular on-camera streamed video reports on the web via AENTV beginning in 2000.

Beck's five-decade run has seen her and Smith's column featured in hundreds of outlets ranging from France and Mexico to Cleveland and Milwaukee. Beck/Smith Hollywood Exclusive continues through Creators Syndicate.

== Other media ==
Beck was heard regularly on local Los Angeles radio station KFI, and was seen regularly on local (KABC) and national television. She hosted NBC "Marilyn Beck's Hollywood Outtakes" specials in 1977 and 1978 which featured stars providing commentary for amusing outtake footage from their films. George Burns co-hosted the second special.

She was the featured Hollywood interviewer on the syndicated "PM Magazine" show from 1983 to 1988.

Beck and Smith were among the media personalities reporting their celebrity stories on E! Entertainment's 1993-1999 "The Gossip Show," occasionally squaring off in lighthearted Point-Counterpoint-style debates.

Beck authored "Marilyn Beck's Hollywood," a 1972 hardcover book about the industry; also the 1988 Berkeley novel about Hollywood, "Only Make Believe". She is one of the authors of the 1995 book, "Unfinished Lives...What if?"

== Awards and recognition ==
Beck won honors from the Los Angeles City Council, the Southern California Motion Picture Council and the ICG Publicists Guild of America. She is listed in Who's Who in the World, Who's Who in America, Who's Who of American Women and Who's Who in Entertainment.

Brigham Young University features a collection of Marilyn Beck works, including published columns from 1963 to 1993, videotapes, photographs, research files, celebrity correspondence, publicity material and drafts of her books.

== Personal ==
Beck attended the University of Southern California, where she was a member of Alpha Epsilon Phi sorority.

A grandmother of four, Beck headquartered for 30 years from her home in Beverly Hills, where she often interviewed the stars for her column and for TV. She resided till her death in the Ocean Hills area of Oceanside, Ca, with her husband since 1980, Arthur Levine, a former Beverly Hills mediator. Marilyn Beck died from lung cancer on May 31, 2014. She was 85.

== Filmography ==
Year	Title	Role	Notes
1980	The Man with Bogart's Face	Reporter #3	
