= Rochelle Lee Shoretz =

American lawyer

- Born: July 27, 1972; Brooklyn, New York
- Died: March 15, 2015 (aged 42); Teaneck, New Jersey
- Education: Barnard College; Columbia Law School
- Known for: Founding Sharsheret

Rochelle Lee Shoretz (July 27, 1972 – May 31, 2015) was an American lawyer and founder and executive director of Sharsheret, an organization supporting young Jewish women with cancer.

== Early life and education ==
Rochelle Lee Shoretz was born in 1972 in Brooklyn, the daughter of Morris Shoretz and Sherry Tenenbaum. She attended Shulamith High School, Barnard College and Columbia Law School. During her undergraduate years at Barnard, she married, and during law school, she worked as a speech writer for David Dinkins.

== Law career and cancer advocacy ==
Shoretz was a law clerk at the United States Supreme Court for Ruth Bader Ginsburg in 1998 and 1999. She was believed to be the first Orthodox Jewish woman to clerk at the Supreme Court.

In 2001, soon after her clerkship at the Supreme Court ended, at age 28, Shoretz learned that she had breast cancer. "You have these life plans at 28 years old that you don't really consider will be altered by a major medical crisis at that age", she remembered. Experiencing first-hand the challenges of young motherhood with cancer, and aware that women of Ashkenazic descent had a higher risk of some cancers, she founded Sharsheret in 2001 for young Jewish women facing cancer. The organization grew to a nationwide organization with a budget of over $2 million per year and a grant from the Centers for Disease Control and Prevention (CDC) to expand its programming.

In 2003, Shoretz was honored as a "Woman to be Watched" by Jewish Women International.

In 2010, Shoretz was appointed to the Federal Advisory Committee on Breast Cancer in Young Women. She was one of the featured profiles in Heroes for my Daughter, a 2012 book by Brad Meltzer.

== Personal life ==
Shoretz married and divorced twice. She had two sons. During several years of remission, Shoretz trained for and ran triathlons and traveled widely to Peru, South Africa, and Israel.

Shoretz died in Teaneck, New Jersey, in 2015, at age 42, from cancer.

== See also ==
- List of law clerks for the sixth seat of the Supreme Court of the United States
