= California State University, Monterey Bay =

Public university in California, U.S.

- Type: Public university
- Established: 1994; 32 years ago
- Parent institution: California State University
- Accreditation: WSCUC
- Endowment: $43.5 million (2023-24)
- President: Carlos Vargas-Aburto (Interim)
- Faculty: 489 (Fall 2024)
- Students: 7,713 (Fall 2024)
- Undergraduates: 6,836 (Fall 2024)
- Postgraduates: 877 (Fall 2024)
- Location: Seaside, California, United States; 36.6534°N 121.7964°W
- Campus: 1,350 acres (550 ha) (5% of the former Fort Ord); Midsize suburb
- Other campuses: King City; Monterey; Paso Robles; Salinas
- Newspaper: The Lutrinae
- Colors: Blue, green, and sand
- Nickname: Otters
- Sporting affiliations: NCAA Division II – CCAA
- Mascot: Monte Rey Otter
- Website: csumb.edu
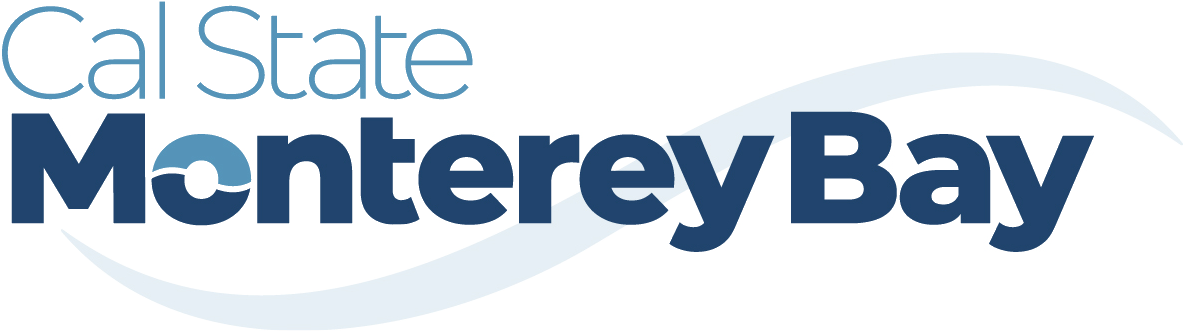

California State University, Monterey Bay (CSUMB or Cal State Monterey Bay) is a public university located in Monterey County, California, United States. The main campus is situated on the site of the former military base Fort Ord, spanning the cities of Seaside and Marina, approximately one mile inland from Monterey Bay along the Central Coast of California. CSUMB also maintains locations in the cities of Monterey and Salinas. Founded in 1994, CSUMB is part of the California State University system and is accredited by the WASC Senior College and University Commission. The university is designated as a Hispanic-Serving Institution.

== History ==
CSUMB was founded in 1994 with a student enrollment of 654 students. Classes began August 28, 1995. The founding president was Peter Plympton Smith. It was the 22nd campus in the California State University system. The university offers 23 bachelor's degrees, 7 master's degrees, and teaching credentials.

As of the fall 2020 semester, the university had 6,276 undergraduate students, 595 graduate students and 186 full-time faculty members. The university operates on the semester system. The president is Vanya Quiñones, who was appointed in August 2022.

CSUMB, in conjunction with Hartnell College, developed CS-in-3, a three-year computer science program funded in part by grants from the Foundation established by Matsui Nursery. A donation of 210 acres of prime agricultural land to the Hartnell College Foundation, valued at US$20 million was granted thereafter.

=== Presidents ===
	Name	Commenced term	Ended term
1.	Peter Plympton Smith	1994	2005
2.	Diane Cordero de Noriega (Interim)	2005	2006
3.	Dianne F. Harrison	2006	2012
4.	Eduardo M. Ochoa	2012	2022
5.	Vanya Quiñones	2022	2026
6.	Carlos Vargas-Aburto (Interim)	2026	Current

== Demographics ==
Undergraduate demographics as of Fall 2023
Race and ethnicity	Total
Hispanic	54%
White	27%
Asian	6%
Two or more races	5%
Black	3%
Unknown	3%
Foreign national	2%
Economic diversity
Low-income (Note: The percentage of students who received an income-based federal Pell grant intended for low-income students.)	44%
Affluent (Note: The percentage of students who are a part of the American middle class at the bare minimum.)	56%

=== Faculty ===
In the fall of 2020, of 489 teaching faculty, 246 held doctorates or another terminal degree, and 150 were members of minority groups. The faculty includes an American Book Award winner and six Fulbright scholars.

=== Students ===
As of spring 2020, the student body was 62% female and 38% male. 33% of students enrolled were under 21 years of age, 45% between 21 and 24, 14% between 25 and 30, 8% were 31 or older. The most common majors were business administration (13%), psychology (11%), computer science (9%), kinesiology (8%), and biology (8%). 43% of students came from Monterey, Santa Cruz, and San Benito counties (all California counties) while 53% came from other parts of California, 2% from other U.S. states and 3% from outside the U.S. Nearly one third (32%) of students were low-income and just over half (53%) were first-generation college students. Distributed across class levels, 14% of students are freshmen, 12% sophomores, 27% juniors and 35% seniors; Cal State Monterey Bay has a large proportion of transfer students. Graduate students make up 9%; 2% were seeking credentials and 1% were post-baccalaureate students.

As of fall 2018 Cal State Monterey Bay has the second largest enrollment percentage of Americans of unknown race or ethnicity in the California State University system. Approximately 50% of CSUMB students live on campus.

== Academics ==
Undergraduate admission statistics
	Fall 2025	Fall 2024	Fall 2023	Fall 2022	Fall 2021
First-time Freshmen
Applicants	14,088	14,943	11,965	12,582	10,026
Admits	13,643	14,545	11,160	11,611	9,305
Admit rate	97%	97%	93%	92%	93%
Enrolled	1,260	1,419	943	904	779
Yield rate	9%	10%	8%	8%	8%
Transfers
Applicants	5,049	5,212	3,666	4,374	4,291
Admits	4,557	4,770	3,173	3,784	3,852
Admit rate	90%	92%	87%	87%	90%
Enrolled	1,267	1,323	857	889	1,087
Yield rate	28%	28%	27%	23%	28%

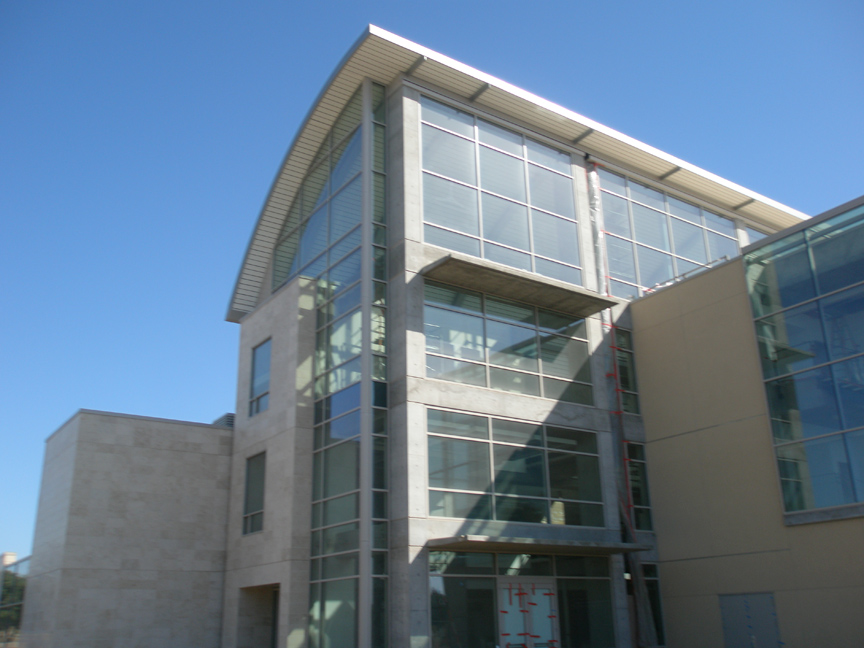
Library under construction from Divarty St, May 2008

The seven most popular majors in Fall 2022

- Psychology at 13%
- Business Administration at 12%
- Computer Science at 10%
- Marine Science at 9%
- Biology at 7%
- Kinesiology at 7%
- Liberal Studies at 7%

=== Rankings ===
The 2022–2023 U.S. News & World Report Best Regional Colleges West Rankings ranks Monterey 4 on top performers on social mobility, 7 on top public schools and 247 in Nursing (tie). In 2021 Monterey ranked 17 on best undergraduate Teaching.

2024-2025 USNWR Best Regional Colleges West Rankings
Top Performers on Social Mobility	1
Top Public Schools	5
Nursing	254

2025 USNWR Graduate School Rankings
Program	Ranking
Social Work	142

Academic rankings

Regional
- U.S. News & World Report: 14

=== Research ===
Under a cooperative agreement with the NASA Ames Research Center, the university performs remote sensing, ecosystem modeling, and geospatial research for earth system science and health. CSUMB researchers work in 10 areas, including coral reef monitoring, land use, carbon modeling and disease transmission.

== Athletics ==
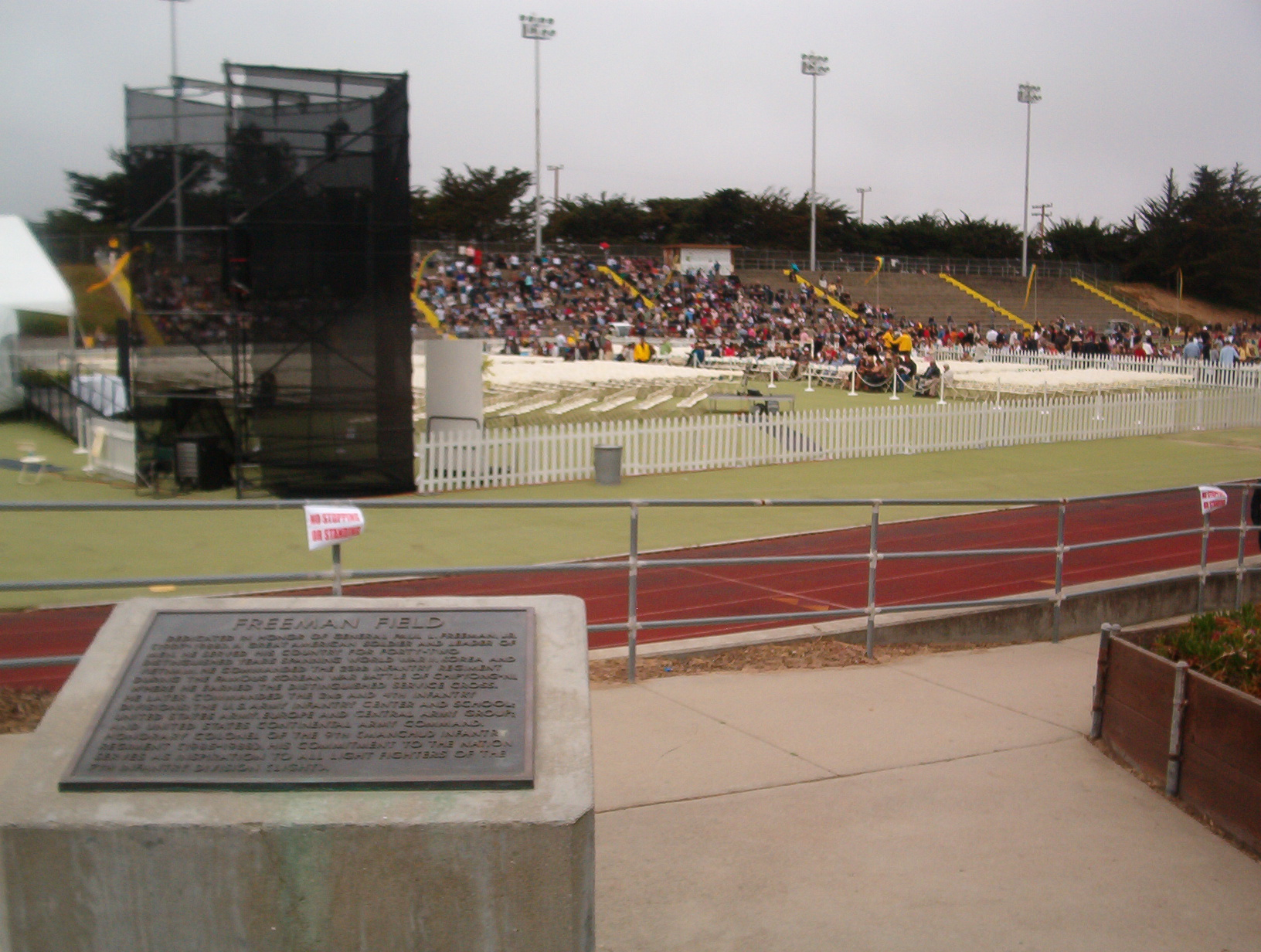
Freeman Stadium filling up for CSUMB's 2006–2007 Graduation Ceremony.

The Cal State–Monterey Bay (CSUMB) athletic teams are called the Otters. The university is a member of the Division II level of the National Collegiate Athletic Association (NCAA), primarily competing in the California Collegiate Athletic Association (CCAA) for most of its sports since the 2004–05 academic year; while its women's water polo teams compete in the Western Water Polo Association (WWPA). The Otters previously competed in the California Pacific Conference (Cal Pac) of the National Association of Intercollegiate Athletics (NAIA) from 1996–97 to 2003–04.

CSUMB competes in 14 intercollegiate varsity sports: Men's sports include baseball, basketball, cross country, golf and soccer; while women's sports include basketball, cross country, golf, soccer, softball, track & field (indoor and outdoor), volleyball and water polo.

CSUMB also has a coed sailing team which competes in the fall and spring (although the spring season is more important). The sailing team competes in the Pacific Coast Collegiate Sailing Conference (PCCSC).

=== Water polo ===
The NCAA Women's Water Polo Championship of Effective Division I sport is open to members of all three NCAA divisions. Only CSU Monterey Bay and CSU East Bay from the CCAA participate in the Western Water Polo Association.

=== Golf ===
The Otters of CSU Monterey Bay earned 1 NCAA Division II Men's Golf Championships in 2011.

== Student life ==
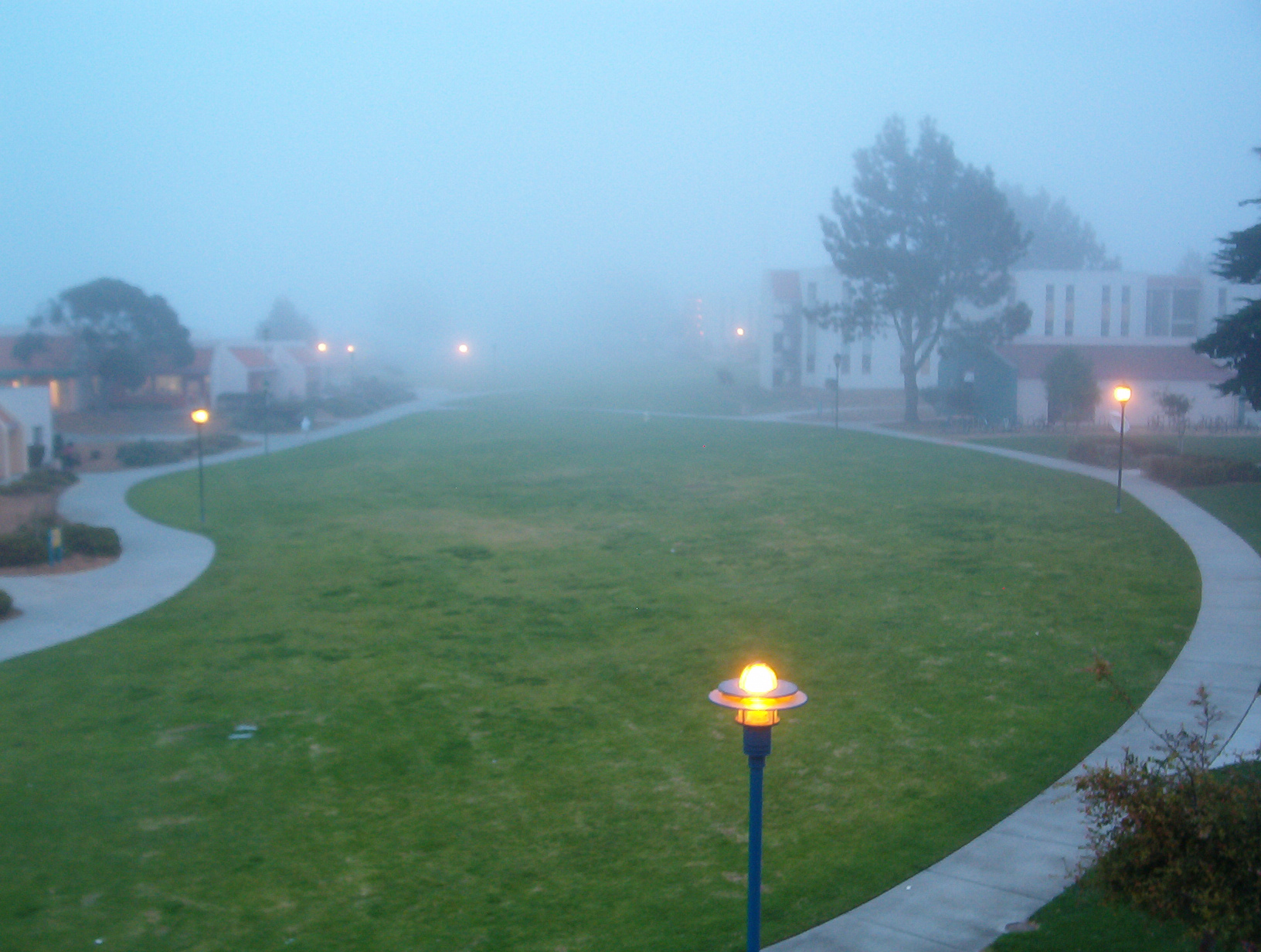
The fog for which Marina is famous can cover the entire campus.

=== Greek life ===
Fraternities and sororities in the Multicultural Greek Council (MGC) include:

- Alpha Kappa Alpha African American interest sorority
- Alpha Kappa Delta Phi Asian interest sorority
- Alpha Sigma Phi fraternity
- Gamma Zeta Alpha Latino interest fraternity
- Delta Sigma Theta African American interest sorority
- Delta Omega Rho multicultural sorority
- Epsilon Sigma Rho multicultural fraternity
- Theta Alpha Sigma sorority
- Kappa Alpha Psi African American interest fraternity
- Kappa Delta Chi Latina Founded sorority
- Kappa Sigma fraternity
- Lambda Theta Nu Latina interest sorority
- Lambda Sigma Gamma multicultural sorority
- Nu Alpha Kappa Latino interest fraternity
- Sigma Theta Psi multicultural sorority
- Sigma Omega Nu Latina interest sorority
- Omega Delta Phi multicultural fraternity

== Campus ==
The university's goal is to be carbon neutral by 2030, with a solar array, installed in 2010, currently meeting 16 percent of the university's needs.

Additionally, the university's Dining Commons were awarded LEED Silver certification in 2011. The Dining Commons were designed to include water efficiency and natural and energy-efficient lighting.

=== Residence Halls ===
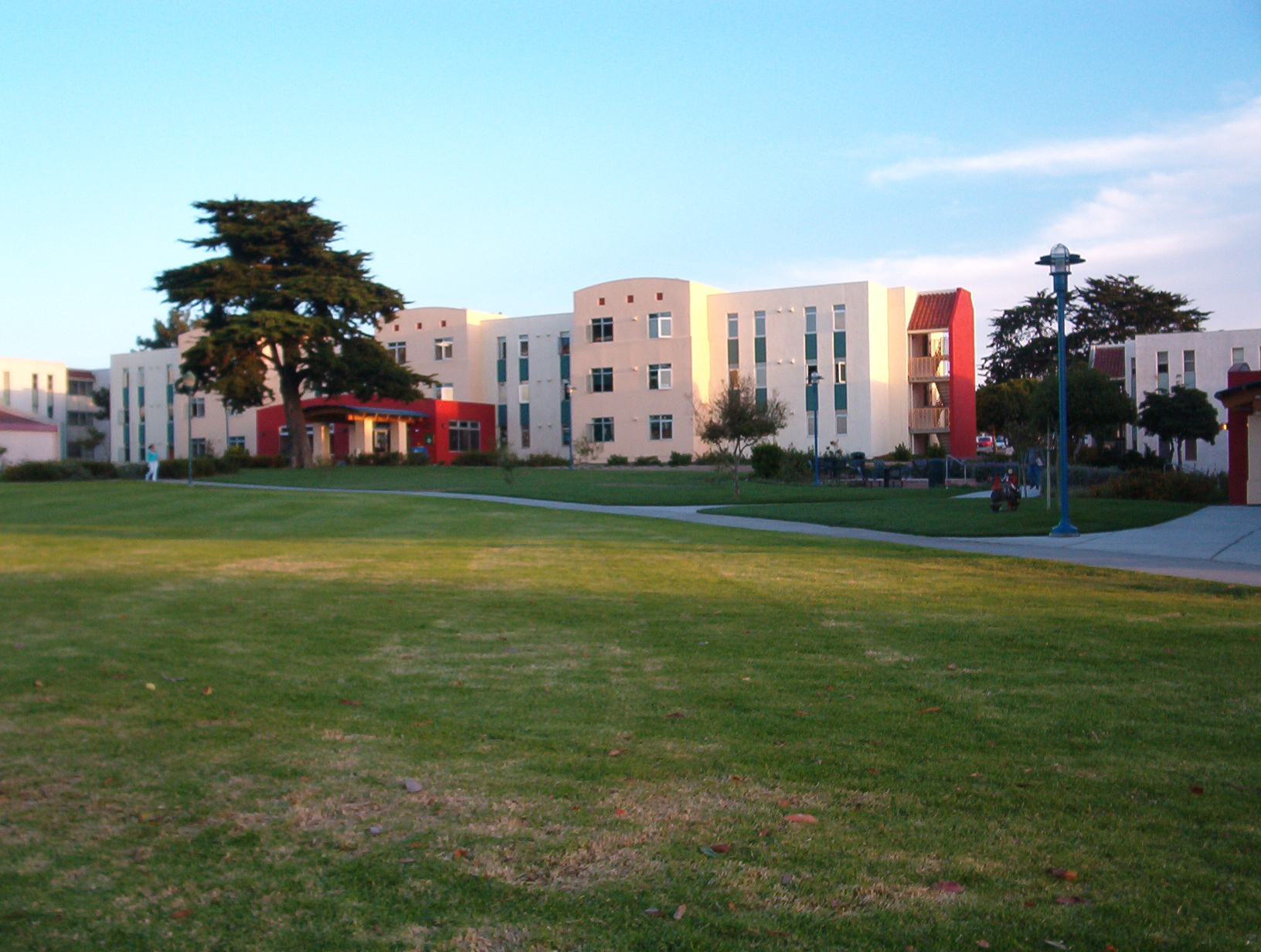
A residence hall in the Quad portion of the campus.

CSUMB offers housing in many areas around campus. On the main campus there are eight residence halls each renovated Army barracks. Willet, Cypress, Manzanita, Asilomar, Yarrow, Avocet, Tortuga, and Sanderling Halls surround the main quad on campus. Pinnacles and Vineyard Suites as well as Strawberry Apartments make up North Quad on the north end of campus. North Quad opened after construction finished in December 2005. In fall of 2015, the university opened three new residence halls, called Promontory, all of which offering apartment size dormitories.

=== Tanimura & Antle Family Memorial Library ===
The Tanimura & Antle Family Memorial Library has 136,151 square feet (12,648.8 m^{2}) of floor space. It is located at Divarty and Fifth streets, and diagonally across from the Chapman Science Center. A roundabout sits between the library and the science building. The Tanimura & Antle Family Memorial Library is certified LEED Silver and has been cited for a range of sustainable design strategies from daylighting and low-energy use to healthy carpets, water conservation, and high-recycled content materials.

Aside from being the largest building on the CSUMB campus, it is the greenest in terms of energy usage. Up to 30% less electricity is needed, for example, because of floor-to-ceiling glass walls that let in natural light. Additionally, ventilation techniques operate through the floor instead of the ceiling, allowing cooler air to travel a lesser distance. The light let in from the atrium is indirect rather than direct sunlight.

=== Other locations ===
CSUMB has other locations within Monterey County, including CSUMB at Ryan Ranch (in Monterey), CSUMB at North Salinas, and CSUMB at Salinas City Center. The National Steinbeck Center is located at CSUMB at Salinas City Center.

CSUMB relies on Monterey–Salinas Transit for transportation among its various locations.

== Notable people ==
=== Faculty ===
- Frances Payne Adler – professor of Creative Writing

=== Alumni ===
- Davion Berry – professional basketball player
- Jared Koenig – professional baseball player
- MC Lars – rapper and producer
- Walmer Martinez – professional soccer player
- Adrian Rebollar – professional soccer player
- Veronica Carmen Ripley – internet personality

== See also ==
- Universities and colleges in Monterey County, California
