= Carmen Warschaw =

American philanthropist and politician

- Born: 1917
- Died: November 6, 2012 (age 95); Los Angeles
- Education: B.A. University of Southern California
- Known for: Democratic party activist
- Spouse: Louis Warschaw
- Children: 2

Carmen Warschaw (c. 1917 – November 6, 2012) was an American philanthropist, politician, and leading figure within the state Democratic Party in California. She was also a former member of the Democratic National Committee and chairwoman of the Southern California Democratic Party. A champion of Democratic politics, political opponents in both parties were known to call her "The Dragon Lady."

== Life and career ==
Warschaw was born circa 1917 as the daughter of Jewish immigrants, and she attended the University of Southern California. She joined the University of California, Los Angeles's chapter of Alpha Epsilon Phi. She and her late husband of 63 years, Louis Warschaw, helped to establish the USC Casden Institute for the Study of the Jewish Role in American Life at the University of Southern California. The University of Southern California Chair in Practical Politics is also named for the Warschaws through their endowment. (Both had graduated from USC). Her philanthropic work extended to Cedars-Sinai Medical Center, where the Louis Warschaw Prostate Cancer Center bears her family's name.

Warschaw was a delegate to the 1952 Democratic National Convention.

Warschaw was first woman to chair the California Fair Employment Practices Commission, which was founded in 1959 to combat discrimination in housing and employment.

The Los Angeles Times named her Woman of the Year in 1976.

Warschaw died on November 6, 2012, in Los Angeles at the age of 95. Her husband, prominent businessman Louis Warschaw, whom she had been married to for 63 years, died in 2000.
