= Frances Payne Adler =

American writer, poet and academic

- Born: 1942 (age 83–84)
- Occupations: Writer, poet and academic

Frances Payne Adler (born 1942) is an American and Canadian writer, poet and academic currently residing in Portland, Oregon.

Adler was a member of the faculty at California State University Monterey Bay (CSUMB), in California, for over 17 years until her retirement in 2006. She founded CSUMB's Creative Writing and Social Action Program in 1996, for which she served as Director until her retirement. She continued teaching online as Professor Emerita until 2011.

Adler claims to have coined the neologism "matriot," in contrast to the "patriot," which was used in the title of her poetry book "The Making of a Matriot." Adler discusses the definition and the origin of matriot in an article on the Tikkun blog.

Adler's current work is a collaborative exhibition of poems, photographs and videos, “Dare I Call You Cousin,” about the Israeli-Palestinian conflict featuring work by Jerusalem photographer Michal Fattal, and Tel Aviv videographer Yossi Yacov.

Her poems and prose have also been published in Poetry International, Women's Review of Books, Calyx, The Progressive, Ms. Magazine, Exquisite Corpse, Fiction International, Centennial Review, Blood to Remember: American Poets on the Holocaust and Ghost Fishing: An Eco-Justice Poetry Anthology.

== Selected awards ==
Adler has won numerous awards including a California State Senate Award for Artistic and Social Collaboration, a National Endowment for the Arts Award, a Margaret Sanger Award, and a Helene Wurlitzer Foundation Award. Adler's Raising the Tents was a Western States Book Award finalist.

== Bibliography ==
- Raising the Tents (Calyx Books, 1993),
- When the Bough Breaks: Pregnancy and the Legacy of Addiction (NewSage Press, 1993),
- Struggle To Be Borne (San Diego State University Press, 1987),
- Home Street Home (National Red Cross, 1984).
- The Making of a Matriot, published in 2003, and second edition in 2017.
