= Sharsheret (organization) =

American non-profit organization

Coordinates: 40.891574°N 74.004164°W

- Formation: 2001
- Founder: Rochelle Lee Shoretz
- Type: Non-profit organization
- Purpose: Social support
- Location: Teaneck, New Jersey
- Region served: United States
- Director of Operations: Elana Silber
- Staff: 20
- Volunteers: 6000
- Website: sharsheret.org

Sharsheret is a nonprofit organization that supports Jewish women diagnosed with breast cancer and ovarian cancer. It provides healthcare resources, financial assistance, communal support, and educational programs to thousands of women and their families in the United States. Sharsheret has offices in California, Florida, Illinois, New Jersey and New York. They are headquartered in Teaneck, New Jersey. Sharsheret primarily works with young women and Jewish families as Ashkenazi Jews are at higher risk of carrying a BRCA gene mutation, but also aids men and women from other backgrounds.

== History ==
Rochelle Lee Shoretz founded Sharsheret in November 2001, when she was 28 years old, after being diagnosed with breast cancer four months earlier. Shoretz had a successful career as a lawyer after attending Columbia Law School and completed a clerkship with US Supreme Court Justice Ruth Bader Ginsburg. She was also a mother of two and a leader in the Jewish community. She died in 2015 at the age of 42.

Shoretz stated that her own experience with breast cancer was her inspiration for Sharsheret. While undergoing treatment, "she yearned to talk with a young woman like herself, someone with young children who had experienced breast cancer, someone Jewish. After a long search she found Lauryn Weiser". The organization pairs women diagnosed with cancer to offer specialized support for members and Shoretz has noted that she feels that "true support needs to be tailored", as support "is not just about cancer and the disease itself, but about your life with cancer".

The Joshua Venture fellowship assisted in the founding of Sharsheret. The fellowship provided resources such as funding and mentoring to select entrepreneurs for two years. Among the first entrepreneurs selected by this program was Rochelle Lee Shoretz, which allowed her to develop Sharsheret.

The organization has an On Campus division and an On Campus Leadership Training program to help high school and college students understand the risks associated with breast cancer. Sharsheret is currently on 250 campuses in America and has 12 national support and education programs. The organization also creates awareness programs, which include Pink Day, Pink Shabbats, Pink Challah Bakes and more.

== Mission ==
Sharsheret, Hebrew for "chain", is an American not-for-profit intended to support young Jewish women with breast cancer or who have a genetic predisposition to it, and their families. Ashkenazi Jews make up the majority of the Jewish community in the United States and are at a higher risk of developing a BRCA gene mutation, as "1 in 40 women of Ashkenazi descent carry an alteration in what are referred to as the BRCA1 or BRCA2 genes, compared to 1 in 345 women in the general population." Only one in 400 people in the US carry this genetic mutation; of that amount, women carriers have an 85% chance of developing breast or ovarian cancer.

Our mission is to offer a community of support to women diagnosed with breast cancer or at increased genetic risk, by fostering culturally-relevant individualized connections with networks of peers, health professionals, and related resources. Since Sharsheret's founding in 2001, we have responded to more than 55,000 breast cancer inquiries, involved more than 5,300 peer supporters, and presented over 250 educational programs annually nationwide.

Sharsheret hosts webinars and other public meetings to educate women on the benefits of genetic testing.

== Activities and events ==
=== Partnerships ===
Sharsheret has several national and corporate partnerships with businesses and organizations such as Pfizer, Moishe House, and 23andMe. The organization has also partnered with the sorority Alpha Epsilon Phi, which selected Sharsheret as one of its national philanthropies in 2008.

=== Pink Day ===
In 2010, Sharsheret created Pink Day to raise awareness and show support for breast cancer survivors. On February 13, people are encouraged to wear pink clothing throughout the day, as observed by many students throughout the country. Jewish student organizations such as Hillel, Chabad, and the Alpha Epsilon Phi sorority plan annual events in honor of Pink Day, including challah bakes, "Pink Shabbat," and tabling events on campus. In 2018, over 100 schools nationwide participated in Pink Day using the Pink Day Tool Kits provided by Sharsheret. The kits include programming ideas, educational resources, physical items to display, and breast cancer awareness terminology for social media content.

== Awards ==
The Centers for Disease Control and Prevention (CDC) awarded Sharsheret with a five-year, $1.8 million cooperative agreement, as of September 2019, to fund the organization's "LINK Program-Outreach and Education Initiative" that works to provide educational programming and services for women under the age of 45 diagnosed with breast cancer. "In collaboration with the CDC and more than 100 local Sharsheret partners nationwide, we will work to serve more than 150,000 women and caregivers, enhancing the quality of life and reducing the cancer burden for breast cancer survivors, metastatic breast cancer patients and caregivers", said Executive Director Elana Silber in response to the award.
