= Delta Sigma Phi =

American collegiate fraternity

- ΔΣΦ
- Founded: December 10, 1899; 126 years ago City College of New York
- Type: Social
- Affiliation: NIC
- Status: Active
- Scope: National
- Motto: "Better Men, Better Lives"
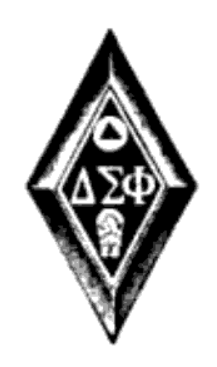
- Member badge
- Colors: Primary: Nile Green; Carnation White; Secondary: Desert Gold; Royal Purple
- Symbol: Sphinx
- Flag
- Flower: White carnation
- Publication: The Carnation
- Chapters: 108 active (including colonies); 233 chartered
- Members: 6,000+ active 150,000+ lifetime
- Nicknames: Delta Sig, DSP, D Sig, Sig
- Headquarters: 5975 Castle Creek Pkwy Drive N, Suite 465; Indianapolis, Indiana 46250; United States
- Website: www.deltasig.org

Delta Sigma Phi (ΔΣΦ), commonly known as Delta Sig, is a fraternity established in 1899 at The City College of New York (CCNY). It was likely the first fraternity founded based on religious and ethnic acceptance to widely practice those ideals by initiating Jewish, Catholic, and Protestant men. It is also one of three fraternities founded at CCNY (now a part of the City University of New York (CUNY)).

Since its inception, Delta Sigma Phi has chartered chapters at 233 different colleges and universities, with 106 actively operating undergraduate chapters and colonies across the United States as of 2023. The fraternity has more than 6,000 undergraduate members and more than 120,000 living alumni members. More than 150,000 men have been initiated into Delta Sigma Phi since its founding.

Delta Sigma Phi is a charter member of the North American Interfraternity Conference. Its national headquarters are located in Indianapolis, Indiana, at the Fairbanks Mansion, the former home of Vice President Charles Warren Fairbanks.

== History ==
=== 1899–1919: Formation of National Fraternity ===
At the end of the nineteenth century, most fraternities were exclusively Christian or Jewish and barred membership to individuals based on religion. When a group of friends at the City College of New York tried to join a fraternity, they were denied membership because their group was composed of Christians and Jews. In response, they organized the first Delta Sigma Phi chapter on December 10, 1899. The chapter was called Insula due to its location in Manhattan.

In late 1902, with five members from Insula signing incorporation papers, Delta Sigma Phi was incorporated with the purpose of spreading "the principles of friendship and brotherhood among college men, without respect to race or creed." By 1903 the fraternity had established chapters at Columbia University and New York University.

Delta Sigma Phi recognizes Charles A. Tonsor Jr. (Christian) and Meyer Boskey (Jewish) as its two primary founding fathers. Although Boskey was one of the original members at the City College of New York and Tonsor was one of the charter members of the chapter at New York University, it is believed the fraternity first was developed by a group of nearly a dozen men. During the short period when men of Jewish faith were barred from membership, many of the fraternity's founding documents were ruined. Given the circumstances, the national organization adopted both Boskey and Tonsor as the "founders" given their lifelong commitment to the fraternity and their service as visionaries for the development of the fraternity's ritual and national expansion.

In the two years after the 1914 Convention, Delta Sigma Phi almost doubled in size with the addition of ten chapters. In 1915, the first West Coast chapter, Hilgard chapter at UC Berkeley was installed. Hilgard Chapter was named after a dean at the university and is the fraternity's only chapter without a Greek letter designation, taking the place of the Xi chapter.

Also in 1914, the fraternity decided to admit only white men of the Christian faith, thus rejecting the founders' vision. Many Jewish members and other minorities left Delta Sigma Phi or joined others, including Meyer Boskey, who withdrew active participation in the fraternity for an extended period.

As a testament to the geographic shift of the fraternity, the 1916 convention was held in Chicago, Illinois. By this time, Delta Sigma Phi had expanded the number of staff, and a national headquarters was created at the Riebold Building at Dayton, Ohio.

When the United States entered World War I in 1917, Delta Sigma Phi had more than 1,000 initiates and nineteen active chapters. During the war, more than three-quarters of the fraternity's membership served the government in some capacity with half of that number in combat duty overseas. Although colleges and universities remained open during the war, many chapters suspended their operations when most of their members were called to service. Some chapters never recovered from the disruptions of World War I.

Delta Sigma Phi continued to expand during the 1920s, with many local fraternities and other social clubs petitioning for membership. Among these was Phi Nu fraternity at McGill University in Montreal, Canada. When Phi Nu was chartered as the Alpha Omicron chapter, Delta Sigma Phi became an international fraternity.

During this time, Delta Sigma Phi published its first pledge manual, the Gordian Knot. It was based upon a manual previously published by the Epsilon chapter at Penn State. The Gordian Knot is considered to be one of the first pledge manuals to be published on a fraternity-wide basis. Another tradition started at this time was the Sailors' Ball, first held at the Alpha Chi chapter at Stetson University. Today, the Sailors' Ball is an annual event that is a semi-formal counterpart to the Carnation Ball, the fraternity's formal banquet.

=== 1929–1945: Great Depression and World War II ===
Two months after the Wall Street crash of 1929, Delta Sigma Phi's yearly convention was held in Richmond, Virginia. Despite the financial uncertainties of the time, a traveling secretary was added to the fraternity payroll. During the Great Depression, the fraternity's national growth came to a halt; college enrollments declined and those who attended college were less likely to be able to afford fraternity membership. Several chapters became dormant and/or lost their equity in chapter properties. Among these were Alpha and Gamma.

The only chapters chartered during the Great Depression were Beta Kappa at the University of Alabama and Beta Lambda at Wake Forest University. During this time, Executive Director A.W. Defenderfer moved the fraternity headquarters to his insurance offices in Washington, D.C.; Delta Sigma Phi was re-incorporated in Washington, D.C., in 1929. Delta Sigma Phi banned Hell Week in 1938.

Although the fraternity was rebounding by the late 1930s, World War II caused another disruption. Many members joined the war effort, leaving the chapters weak. The fraternity's only Canadian chapter at McGill University became dormant, with many of its members joining to Commonwealth Forces. By 1944, only eleven of the fraternity's 43 chapters were active.

=== 1945–1999: Post-War Growth, Desegregation, and Expansion ===
The Fraternity Seal

After the war, the GI Bill allowed many veterans to attend college. With an influx of new students, many of the dormant chapters were re-activated. Another consequence of the GI Bill was the establishment of many new public universities. With more institutions open to fraternities, Delta Sigma Phi experienced a great period of growth.

In the late 1940s, college administrators across the country began to refuse expansion to fraternities with restrictive rules on membership. In response to the new rules, the fraternity's leadership amended the constitution of the national fraternity to remove all references to race or religion. However, the line "the belief in God is essential to our welfare" in the preamble was untouched and remains so to this day.

In a compromise to several southern chapters, the amendments to the constitution were approved at the 1949 convention while language barring the initiation of non-white and non-Christians was inserted into the fraternity ritual. Since the ritual was a private document and the constitution a public one, this compromise appeased those who resisted the integration of the fraternity while allowing it to expand to new universities.

The 1950s were a turbulent time for fraternities and sororities in general. While most of the national Greek-letter organizations still had rules restricting membership, a few chapters bucked the edicts and initiated Jews and African Americans. Some of those chapters were suspended by their national organizations, while others disaffiliated from their national organizations and withdrew and became local fraternities. In 1957, the California Legislature threatened to pass Assembly Bill 758, prohibiting state universities and colleges from recognizing any student organization that "restricts its membership based on either race, color, religion or national origin." Two years later, the regents of the University of California passed a regulation requiring all fraternities and sororities to sign a certificate stating the organization did not have any discriminatory policies. Failure to comply could mean the loss of recognition.

Delta Sigma Phi faced these issues at its 1959 convention. While the organization was interested in maintaining its California chapters, there was opposition to any plan to integrate the entire fraternity. Several southern chapters passed resolutions against any relaxation of racial and religious restrictions and threatened to withdraw from the fraternity. A compromise again was reached where the current rules were not to be changed but exemptions were granted to chapters in danger of losing their recognition due to fraternity policies. The California chapters immediately were given exemptions.

In 1962, the Pennsylvania State System of Higher Education joined the University of California by requiring the integration of its fraternities and sororities. Exemptions were given to the chapters in Pennsylvania. While exemptions originally were granted to chapters in danger of losing recognition with their universities, the Beta Iota chapter at Wittenberg University received a special exemption. When the chapter intended to initiate an African American who was an All-American athlete and an outstanding scholar, the fraternity responded by offering an exemption, likely to avoid bad publicity.

The process of full integration was slow and awkward. As a result of several compromises the fraternity remained intact on a national level. When Civil Rights legislation was enacted, Delta Sigma Phi was once more a universal brotherhood of man, just as the founders intended.

=== 2000-Present ===
At its 2005 convention, the fraternity adopted "Vision 2025," a plan to transform Delta Sigma Phi into "America's Leading Fraternity" by the year 2025 with aggressive goals for leadership training, alumni involvement, and new chapter development. Delta Sigma Phi also adopted the American Red Cross as its national philanthropy.

Among the initiatives laid out in Vision 2025, the fraternity provided leadership education to all of its undergraduates, developed "The Summit" to train all presidents and recruitment chairmen with professional recruitment techniques, and opened between eight and twelve chapters annually to reach 200 undergraduate chapters by 2025. Rather than closing struggling chapters with small memberships, the fraternity actively redeveloped them as they would develop a brand-new chapter.

Delta Sigma Phi established a partnership with Phired Up Productions, a fraternity and sorority recruitment consulting company, to coach its New Chapter Development team. During the second decade of the 21st Century, the fraternity began to benefit from this partnership. Twenty-two new chapter developments or redevelopments took place between 2009 and 2013. The organization-wide GPA surpassed the 3.0 mark and 100,000 dollars was made available for academic scholarships through the McKee Scholarship. The fraternity's staff grew more than 50 percent from 2011 to 2014. The fraternity also prohibited hazing.

== Symbols ==
The Membership Badge

The Sphinx was the first symbol adopted by the fraternity at the time of its inception. Chosen for its longevity and stability over centuries. Other symbols include a lamp, a lute (depicted as a lyre), a Gordian Knot, and the Egyptian Pyramids. The white carnation was chosen as the fraternity's flower because it contains the fraternity's colors; white and Nile green as well as being a relatively common and sturdy flower that can grow in almost any climate. The publications of the fraternity are often named after its symbols:

- The Sphinx – an esoteric publication for initiated members only
- The Gordian Knot – the new member manual
- The Lute – the fraternity songbook
- The Carnation – a quarterly publication delivered to all members

The pledge emblem is a white circle with a green equilateral triangle set inside of it. Gold lines radiate from the center of the emblem to the three points of the triangle in addition to outlining the circle and triangle. The pledge emblem is very prevalent in the symbolism of the fraternity; not only is the emblem on the pledge pin, but the emblem also graces the flag, the membership badge and the basic design is also the basis of the fraternity's seal.

It is also common tradition for a New Member to present their "Big" with a decorated paddle.

== Current Programs ==
The Biennial Convention: The longest-running program of the Fraternity, occurring for the 64th time in 2025. Delegates from undergraduate chapters and alumni group elect members to the Grand Council and vote on amendments to the Constitution or general resolutions. The program also regularly includes a silent auction through the Fraternity Foundation, breakout educational sessions, service activities, and social activities/excursions.

Leadership Institute: A five-day for up to 50 undergraduate participants and led entirely by trained alumni volunteers. The Leadership Institute was launched in 1993, and teaches general and foundational elements of leadership.

LEAD Weekend: Two-day programs focused on Membership Growth, Health and Safety, and Membership Experience. Lead Weekends occur in 3-4 locations annually and are primarily targeted at executive officer members of undergraduate chapters.

Cycyota Volunteer Institute: An online program offering skills and policy education for volunteer advisors, alumni chapter officers, alumni association officers, and alumni corporation (housing) board members.

Philanthropy For much of the 21st Century, the fraternity considered the American Red Cross its official philanthropic partner and focus. Chapters were encouraged to organize blood drives and to raise funds with the American Red Cross, and to build relationships with their local Red Cross Chapters. Other initiatives included members receiving CPR certification and several inter-chapter fundraising.

In the 2020s, the Fraternity moved away from alignment with one philanthropic partner, and chapters are currently encouraged to establish a philanthropic relationship with a local charity (or charities).

== Affiliated Organizations ==
Foundation: The Delta Sigma Phi Foundation is a charitable and educational not-for-profit organization, separate and independent from Delta Sigma Phi Fraternity. Donations to the Foundation are used to cover or subsidize the cost of the Fraternity's national education programs. The Foundation also offers several scholarships, the largest of which is the McKee Scholarship, which has awarded over $1,000,000 in scholarships to undergraduate and graduate members since 2009. The Foundation also allows for donations to chapter-designated leadership funds. Members may submit grant requests to utilize these funds for education-related expenses, such as workshops or upgrades to study facilities/materials.

Housing Corporation: The National Housing Corporation is a non-profit 501c7 company providing housing support and services to chapters of the Fraternity. Not all chapter facilities are owned or operated by the National Housing Corporation.

== Individual chapter or member misconduct ==
In 2014, the chapter at San Diego State University was shut down due to a string of hazing and alcohol violations, and misconduct, including waving dildos at protestors during an anti-rape rally on campus.

In 2024, three members of the University of Texas at Austin chapter, including the vice president, were arrested for allegedly attacking a gay man.

In 2025, the chapter at the University of Oregon, in Eugene, Oregon, was suspended and disaffiliated after a third-party investigation found that new members had been subjected to hazing, including being forced to plank on broken glass, which in the case of one student resulted in a cut that required stitches. The UO chapter had previously been disciplined in 2024 after druggings had occurred at several parties they hosted. The organization cannot apply for re-recognition until 2030 at the earliest and was required to vacate their facilities.

== See also ==
- List of social fraternities and sororities
