= Gamma Zeta Alpha =

American Latino-interest collegiate Fraternity

- ΓΖΑ
- Founded: December 3, 1987; 38 years ago California State University, Chico, U.S.
- Type: Social
- Affiliation: NALFO
- Status: Active
- Emphasis: Latino Interest
- Scope: Western United States
- Motto: "Cultivating Leaders, Strengthening Communities"
- Pillars: Academic Excellence, Community Service, and Brotherhood
- Colors: Silver, Black, and White
- Philanthropy: California Academic Decathlon, Day of Service, Youth Conference
- Chapters: 25
- Nickname: Gammas
- Headquarters: 620 W. McCarthy Way, Suite 194; Los Angeles, California 90007; United States
- Website: www.gammas.org

Gamma Zeta Alpha Fraternity, Inc. (ΓΖΑ) is an American fraternity that emphasizes Latino culture and the success of Latino males in higher education. It was founded on December 3, 1987 at California State University, Chico in Chico, California.

Following its founding principles, the fraternity encourages and creates programs that assist disadvantaged and low-income communities. Its goals are to promote scholarship for Latinos in higher education while instilling a sense of pride in Latino heritage.

== History ==
In 1987, fifteen men came together to found what would later become Gamma Zeta Alpha Fraternity, Inc.

=== Expansion ===
Since its founding, Gamma Zeta Alpha Fraternity, Inc. has expanded to include chapters at schools throughout California, Arizona, Nevada, and Colorado. Gamma Zeta Alpha Fraternity, Inc. strives to ensure the potential for growth for all of its chapters once they are established. By teaching prospective members organizational knowledge and valuable skill sets to run a successful chapter, Gamma Zeta Alpha Fraternity, Inc. sets a foundation that promotes the success of its chapters within the university and surrounding communities.

=== NALFO ===
Established in 1998, the National Association of Latino Fraternal Organizations (NALFO) is an umbrella council for 21 Latino Greek letter organizations across the United States. The purpose of NALFO is to promote and foster positive interfraternal relations, communication, and development of all Latino fraternal organizations through mutual respect, leadership, honesty, professionalism and education.

== Symbols ==
The fraternity's colors are silver, black, and white. Its motto is "Cultivating Leaders, Strengthening Communities." Its pillars are academic excellence, community service, and brotherhood.

== Membership ==
Although Gamma Zeta Alpha Fraternity, Inc. is Latino by tradition, membership in the fraternity is open to all college males and includes members from various ethnicities including Black, Asian, Middle Eastern, White, European, and others. To begin the membership education process of Gamma Zeta Alpha Fraternity, Inc., every prospective member must fulfill the following requirements:

- be a full-time undergraduate or graduate student at a four-year college or university.
- have a minimum 2.5 cumulative grade point average.

== Member misconduct allegations ==
Gamma Zeta Alpha Fraternity, Inc. has faced allegations of misconduct, particularly concerning sexual misconduct and policy violations. In July 2020, the fraternity acknowledged recent allegations against its members and issued a public statement emphasizing a zero-tolerance stance on sexual misconduct.

In October 2020, the San Diego State University chapter of Gamma Zeta Alpha was implicated in organizing an in-person social gathering during the COVID-19 pandemic, violating university policies. University staff received reports of the planned gathering, leading chapter leadership to instruct members to cancel the event. However, fraternity members from different households convened at an off-campus apartment before proceeding to another location, contravening public health guidelines and university directives.

These incidents have prompted Gamma Zeta Alpha to try to implement structural changes within the organization. In response to misconduct allegations, certain members of the Board of Directors and Committee Members stepped down from their leadership roles at the request of the Executive Officers.

== Chapters ==
Following is a list of the chapters of Gamma Zeta Alpha. Active chapters are indicated in bold. Inactive chapters are in italics.

Chapter	Charter date and range	Institution	Locations	Status	Ref.
**Alpha**	1987	California State University, Chico	Chico, California	Active	
**Beta**	1989	San Jose State University	San Jose, California	Active	
**Gamma**	1992	University of California, Berkeley	Berkeley, California	Active	
**Delta**	1993	California State University, Northridge	Los Angeles, California	Active	
Epsilon	1997	California State University, Fresno	Fresno, California	Inactive	
**Zeta**	1997	San Diego State University	San Diego, California	Active	
**Eta**	2000	University of California, Los Angeles	Los Angeles, California	Active	
**Theta**	2000	University of California, Davis	Davis, California	Active	
**Iota**	2000	Stanford University	Stanford, California	Active	
**Kappa**	2000	University of California, Santa Barbara	Santa Barbara, California	Active	
**Lambda**	2002	California State University, Monterey Bay	Monterey County, California	Active	
**Mu**	2003	California State University, Sacramento	Sacramento, California	Active	
**Nu**	2004	University of California, San Diego	San Diego, California	Active	
**Xi**	2005	California State University, Los Angeles	Los Angeles, California	Active	
**Omicron**	2005	California Polytechnic State University, San Luis Obispo	San Luis Obispo, California	Active	
**Pi**	2008	Arizona State University	Tempe, Arizona	Active	
**Rho**	2010	University of Southern California	Los Angeles, California	Active	
**Sigma**	2010	California State Polytechnic University, Pomona	Pomona, California	Active	
**Tau**	2011	California State University, East Bay	Hayward, California	Active	
**Upsilon**	2011	California State University, Dominguez Hills	Carson, California	Active	
Phi	2012	University of California, Merced	Merced, California	Inactive	(Note: This was an alumni chapter.)
**Chi**	2016	California State University, San Bernardino	San Bernardino, California	Active	
**Psi**	2019	University of San Francisco	San Francisco, California	Inactive	
**Alpha Alpha**	2020	Colorado State University	Fort Collins, Colorado	Active	
**Alpha Beta**	2020	University of California, Merced	Merced, California	Active	
**Alpha Gamma**	2022	University of Nevada, Las Vegas	Paradise, Nevada	Active	
**Alpha Delta**	2025	University of the Pacific	Stockton, California	Active	

== See also ==
- List of social fraternities
- National Association of Latino Fraternal Organizations
