= Nu Alpha Kappa =

American college Latino-based fraternity

- ΝΑΚ
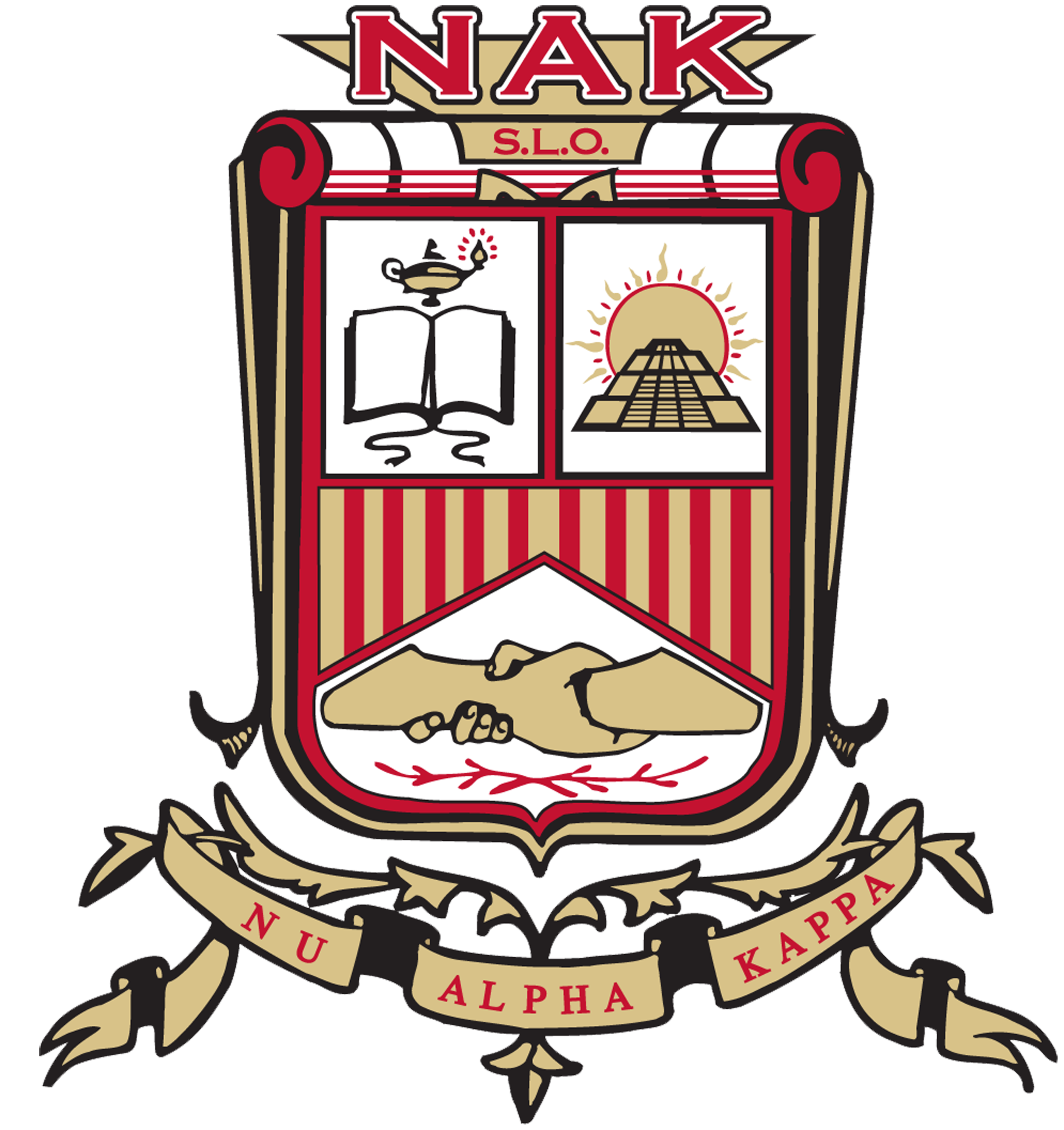
- Founded: February 26, 1988; 38 years ago California Polytechnic State University
- Type: Social
- Affiliation: NIC
- Former affiliation: NALFO
- Status: Active
- Emphasis: Latino
- Scope: National
- Motto: "Men of Mind, Men of Culture, Men of Pride"
- Colors: Red, White, and Bronze
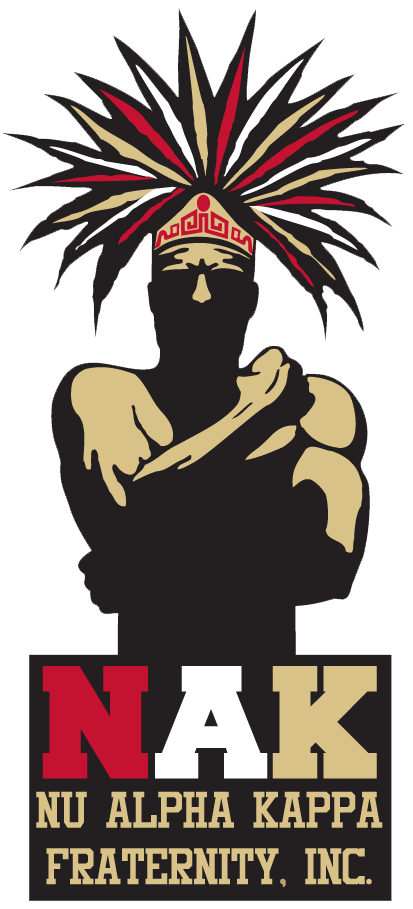
- Mascot: XiNAKo
- Chapters: 28
- Nickname: NAKs, Nakos, Xinakos
- Headquarters: P.O. Box 1287; Roseville, California 95678; United States
- Website: www.naknet.org

Nu Alpha Kappa (ΝΑΚ) is an American collegiate Latino-based fraternity. Nu Alpha Kappa was founded on the campus of California Polytechnic State University in 1988. Nu Alpha Kappa was a charter member of the National Association of Latino Fraternal Organizations (NALFO). It is now a member of the North American Interfraternity Conference.

== History ==
The fraternity began with fifteen friends at Cal Poly San Luis Obispo, California who wanted to create a club for Hispanic students at the predominantly Anglo campus. Initially, the group called itself "Naco", after Spanish slang for a person who gets along well with everyone.

This became Nu Alpha Kappa on February 26, 1988. The fraternity was established based on a commitment to "Carnalismo" or brotherhood, the search for knowledge, and the retention and pride of culture. Eleven of the original organizing friends became the fraternity's founders, including:

- Antonio Arreola
- Marin Arreola
- Nicolas Arreola
- Ernesto Garcia
- Moises Herrera
- Jesse Martinez
- Hector Mendoza
- Joel Romero
- Alberto Salazar
- Antonio Valenzuela
- Ramiro Ramos

A second chapter was established at San Jose State University in 1989, followed by a chapter at San Diego State University in 1990. Its first chapter outside of California was chartered at Colorado State University in 1999. However, the majority of its 28 chapters are in California.

The fraternity's national headquarters is in Roseville, California.

== Symbols ==
The name ΝΑΚ was selected to represent the "nac" sound in Xinaco. Xinaco (CHI-Na-Kos), a Nahuatl word used by the Olmecs, describes "an educated, amiable individual whose personality and charisma transcends and enlightens all cultures and social".

The fraternity's colors are red, white, and bronze. Its mascot is XiNAKo. Its motto is "Men of Mind, Men of Culture, Men of Pride."

== Philanthropy ==
Nu Alpha Kappa supports the National Marrow Donor Program (NMDP) and its Hispanic/Latino Stem Cell and Marrow Initiative in California, Colorado, and Nevada. Its other charity is the NAKLand Children's Carnival.

== Chapters ==
=== Collegiate chapters ===
Nu Alpha Kappa has established collegiate chapters in California, Nevada, and Colorado. Active chapters are indicated in bold. Inactive chapters and institutions are in italics.

Chapter	Charter date and range	Institution	Location	Status	Ref.
**Founding**	February 26, 1988	California Polytechnic State University, San Luis Obispo	San Luis Obispo, California	Active	
**Alpha**	February 16, 1989	San Jose State University	San Jose, California	Active	
**Beta**	February 10, 1990	San Diego State University	San Diego, California	Inactive	
**Gamma**	June 20, 1992	Sonoma State University	Rohnert Park, California	Active	
**Delta**	November 22, 1992	California State University, Stanislaus	Turlock, California	Active	
**Epsilon**	November 22, 1992	California State University, Fresno	Fresno, California	Active	
Zeta	November 22, 1992 – 201x ?	University of California, Santa Barbara	Santa Barbara, California	Inactive	(Note: The university closed the chapter for “risk management violations in conjunction with sexual harassment/sexual assault.”)
**Eta**	September 18, 1993	Santa Clara University	Santa Clara, California	Active	
**Theta**	September 5, 1995	California State University, Chico	Chico, California	Active	
**Iota**	July 26, 1996	California State University, Sacramento	Sacramento, California	Active	
**Kappa**	November 30, 1997	University of California, Davis	Davis, California	Active	
**Lambda**	December 21, 1997	University of California, San Diego	La Jolla, California	Active	
**Mu**	April 10, 1999	Colorado State University	Fort Collins, Colorado	Active	
**Nu**	November 12, 2000	University of California, Riverside	Riverside, California	Active	
**Xi**	February 28, 2004	California State University, Monterey Bay	Seaside, California	Active	
**Omicron**	April 17, 2004	University of Nevada, Reno	Reno, Nevada	Active	
**Pi**	April 2, 2005	California State University, Northridge	Northridge, California	Active	
**Rho**	April 30, 2005	University of California, Los Angeles	Los Angeles, California	Active	
**Sigma**	April 21, 2007	University of Northern Colorado	Greeley, Colorado	Active	
Tau	May 18, 2008 – 20xx ?	California State Polytechnic University, Pomona	Pomona, California	Inactive	
Upsilon	May 23, 2009 – 20xx ?	University of Nevada, Las Vegas	Paradise, Nevada	Active	
Phi	November 12, 2011 – 2015	National Hispanic University	San Jose, California	Inactive	(Note: The chapter went inactive when the university closed in August 2015.)
**Chi**	May 26, 2012	California State University, San Marcos	San Marcos, California	Active	
**Psi**	August 17, 2012	University of California, Irvine	Irvine, California	Active	
Omega				Memorial	
Alpha Alpha	December 6, 2014 – 20xx ?	University of California, Berkeley	Berkeley, California	Inactive	
**Alpha Beta**	December 14, 2014	San Francisco State University	San Francisco, California	Active	
**Alpha Gamma**	May 6, 2017	Metropolitan State University of Denver	Denver, Colorado	Active	
Alpha Delta	October 20, 2018 – 202x ?	University of San Diego	San Diego, California	Inactive	

=== Alumni chapters ===
The ΝΑΚ National Alumni Association was officially established in 2014. Following is a list of the Nu Alpha Kappa alumni chapters. Active chapters are indicated in bold. Inactive chapters are in italics.

Chapter	Institution	Status	Ref.
Fresno State Alumni Association	California State University, Fresno	Active	
UCSD ΝΑΚ Alumni Association	University of California, San Diego	Active	
NAK Riverside Alumni Association	University of California, Riverside	Active	
Iota Chapter	California State University, Sacramento	Active	
Kappa Chapter	University of California, Davis	Active	
Beta Chapter – ALAS	San Diego State University	Active	
Tau Chapter Alumni Association	California State Polytechnic University, Pomona	Active	
San Jose State Alpha Alumni Association	San Jose State University	Active	
Delta Chapter Alumni Association	California State University, Stanislaus	Active	
Gamma Chapter	Sonoma State University	Active	

== Member and chapter misconduct ==
Nu Alpha Kappa has faced multiple allegations of hazing, misconduct, and policy violations across several of its chapters. In 2015, the University of California, Santa Barbara chapter was shut down following reports of hazing and sexual assault allegations against members of the fraternity. The chapter was among three Greek organizations at UCSB that lost university recognition due to violations of student conduct policies, including allegations of providing alcohol to minors and fostering an unsafe environment within fraternity-sponsored events.

In 2020, the San Diego State University chapter was placed on interim suspension as part of a broader crackdown on Greek organizations following allegations of alcohol-related violations and hazing. The university's investigation later found that members of Nu Alpha Kappa at SDSU were guilty of theft, leading to the chapter's suspension in early 2021.

In 2023, the San José State University chapter was issued a cease and desist order, temporarily halting its operations due to alleged violations of university policies. While details of the allegations were not publicly disclosed, the order was part of a broader review of fraternity and sorority conduct at the university.

In 2025, the University of California, Riverside chapter was placed on interim suspension due to hazing allegations.

== See also ==
- List of social fraternities and sororities
- Cultural interest fraternities and sororities
