= Sigma Theta Psi =

American multicultural sorority

- ΣΘΨ
- Founded: November 13, 1991; 34 years ago San Jose State University
- Type: Social
- Affiliation: Independent
- Status: Active
- Emphasis: Multicultural
- Scope: National
- Motto: "Only the Strong Survive"
- Pillars: Honesty, Loyalty, Respect, Open-Mindedness, Leadership, and Academic Excellence
- Colors: Purple, Black, and Gold
- Flower: Orchid
- Mascot: Black panther
- Philanthropy: Breast cancer awareness
- Chapters: 8 active
- Headquarters: 1509 E Campus Drive; Fullerton, California 95834; United States
- Website: www.sigmathetapsi.com

Sigma Theta Psi (ΣΘΨ) is a multicultural, academic, and social sorority. The sorority was founded at San Jose State University (SJSU) in 1991.

== History ==
The founding mothers of Sigma Theta Psi created the sorority on November 13, 1991, at San Jose State University. It is a multicultural, academic, and social sorority.

The founding mothers were:

- Lourdes Andrade
- Isabel Arias
- Blanca De La Torre
- Beatrice Gomez
- Maria Gonzalez
- Carmen Guzman
- Laura Cruz-Hernandez
- Tammy Loredo
- Laura Martinez
- Evangelina Moran
- Karina Murcia
- Ruby Nieto
- Augustina Pedroza
- Lupe Pedroza
- Shemar Pierce
- Cecilia Ramos
- Guadalupe Rojas
- Liz Vasquez

Over time, the sorority expanded and has chartered fourteen chapters. Its headquarter are at 1509 E Campus Drive in Fullerton, California.

== Symbols ==
Sigma Theta Psi's motto is "Only the Strong Survive". Its pillars are Honesty, Loyalty, Respect, Open-Mindedness, Leadership, and Academic Excellence.

The colors of Sigma Theta Psi are purple, black, and gold. Its flower is the orchid. Its mascot is the black panther.

== Activities ==
Each year, chapters organize multicultural, social, and academic events ranging from step shows to guest speakers to professional development events. The sorority's national philanthropy is breast cancer awareness.

== Chapters ==
Sigma Theta Psi has chartered fourteen chapters at universities and colleges in California and Nevada. Active chapters are indicated in bold. Inactive chapters by italics.

Chapter	Charter date and range	Institution	Location	Status	Ref.
**Founding**	November 13, 1991	San Jose State University	San Jose, California	Active	
**Alpha**	May 1, 1993	San Diego State University	San Diego, California	Active	
Beta	April 17, 1997	University of Southern California	Los Angeles, California	Inactive	
Gamma	November 12, 2000	California State University, Long Beach	Long Beach, California	Inactive	
Delta	December 3, 2001	Stanford University	Stanford, California	Inactive	
Epsilon	December 10, 2001	Mount Saint Mary's University, Los Angeles	Los Angeles, California	Inactive	
**Zeta**	June 21, 2002	California State University, Monterey Bay	Monterey Bay, California	Active	
Eta	June 7, 2003	University of Nevada, Las Vegas	Las Vegas, Nevada	Inactive	
**Theta**	December 4, 2004	California State University, Sacramento	Sacramento, California	Active	
Iota	May 8, 2011	University of San Diego	San Diego, California	Inactive	
Kappa	May 26, 2012	University of California, Santa Barbara	Santa Barbara, California	Inactive	
Lambda	March 2, 2013	California State University, Fresno	Fresno, California	Inactive	
Mu	May 5, 2013		Merced, California	Inactive	
**Nu**	April 23, 2017	University of California, Merced	Merced, California	Active	
**Xi**	May 19, 2021	California State University, Fullerton	Fullerton, California	Active	
**Omega**				Memorial	

== See also ==
- Cultural interest fraternities and sororities
