= Lambda Sigma Gamma =

American multicultural collegiate sorority

- ΛΣΓ
- Founded: October 24, 1986; 39 years ago California State University, Sacramento
- Type: Social
- Affiliation: NMGC
- Status: Active
- Emphasis: Multicultural
- Scope: Regional
- Motto: "Unity Through Sisterhood"
- Pillars: Academics, Multiculturalism, Sisterhood, Community Service, Professionalism
- Colors: Kelly Green, White, and Ruby Red
- Flower: Red Rose
- Jewel: Emerald, Pearl, and Ruby
- Mascot: Teddy Bear
- Philanthropy: California Head Start Program
- Chapters: 26
- Members: 4,000 active
- Website: www.lambdasigmagamma.org

Lambda Sigma Gamma Sorority, Incorporated (ΛΣΓ) is an American multicultural sorority. It was founded at California State University, Sacramento, in 1986.

== History ==
Lambda Sigma Gamma Sorority was formed on October 24, 1986. The Founding Mothers are as follows:

- Maggie Aguilar
- Esther Almazan
- Angeles Arrezola
- Maria Barriga
- Sandra Barriga
- Maria Cejudo
- Luisa Deluna
- Teresa Esquivel
- Teresa Favila
- Linda V. Fuentes
- Gloria Gallegos
- Patricia Garcia
- Rosa Garcia
- Lulu Gonzales
- Susana Liborio
- Lorena Martinez
- Rebecca Mercado
- Sophia Mercado
- Marisa Reyes
- Martha Reyes
- Reyna Reyes
- Lucy Robles
- Rosa Robles
- Anna Rubalcaba
- Alicia Ruiz
- Yolanda Sanchez
- Angelica Ulloa

Lambda Sigma Gamma was officially incorporated and recognized as a service-based, nonprofit corporation by the State of Delaware on April 3, 1998. Subsequently, the sisterhood is also known as Lambda Sigma Gamma Sorority, Incorporated.

Lambda Sigma Gamma is a member of the National Multicultural Greek Council (NMGC). Since its formation, 25 additional chapters have been chartered. Its membership was 4,000 as of 2024.

== Symbols ==
The motto of Lambda Sigma Gamma is "Unity Through Sisterhood. Beauty Through Diversity." Its pillars are Academics, Multiculturalism, Sisterhood, Community Service, and Professionalism.

Its colors are kelly green, white, and ruby red. Its jewels are the emerald, pearl, and ruby. Its flower is the red rose. Its mascot is a tan teddy bear with a collared red ribbon; it symbolizes the warmth of the sisters' relationships.

The sorority offers various graduation cords, each corresponding to a specific degree. Members who have received a bachelor's degree may wear a green cord. Master's degrees are represented by white cords. Doctor degrees may wear black cords. Advanced degrees are represented by yellow cords.

== Philanthropy ==
Lambda Sigma Gamma adopted the California Head Start Program as its national philanthropy in 1989.

== Past National Presidents ==
Year(s)	Name	Membership
1996 - 1998	Claudia Palos	Zeta Chapter, Beta Class #17
1998 - 1999	Linda V. Fuentes	Alpha Chapter, Alpha Class #10
1999 - 2000	Arlene Lemus	Zeta Chapter, Eta Class #13
2000 - 2002	Candida Gonzalez	Iota Chapter, Beta Class #1
2002 - 2003	Brenda Rodriguez	Zeta Chapter, Eta Class #3
2003 - 2006	Katia Pena	Kappa Chapter, Delta Class #4
2006 - 2008	Nichole Gutierrez	Beta Chapter, Eta Class #1
2008 - 2009	Danielle Munoz	Beta Chapter, Lambda Class #3
2009 - 2010	Alea Newman	Iota Chapter, Mu Class #2
2010 - 2011	Araseli Cuevas	Lambda Chapter, Lambda Class #2
2011 - 2012	Latoya Marie Jackson	Alpha Chapter, Sigma Class #8
2012 - 2013	Katia Pena	Kappa Chapter, Delta Class #4
2013 - 2015	Mayra Estrada	Kappa Chapter, Xi Class #5
2015 - 2017	Elva C. Pena	Tau Chapter, Eta Class #3
2017 - 2020	Keosha A. Griffiths	Rho Chapter, Iota Class #1
2020 - 2022	Nayeli Galan Calito	Xi Chapter, Rho Class #1
2022 - 2023	Kathryn Penunuri	Alpha Alpha Chapter, Iota Class #7
2023 - 2025	Elizabeth Balcom	Rho Chapter, Pi Class #7
2025 - Current	Sandra Torres	Delta Chapter, Alpha Alpha Class #3

== Chapters ==
In the following list, active chapters are noted in bold and inactive chapters are noted in italics.

Chapter Name	Founding Date	University	Location
**Alpha**	1986	California State University, Sacramento	Sacramento, California
Beta	1989	University of California, Davis	Davis, California
**Gamma**	1989	San Jose State University	San Jose, California
**Delta**	1990	California State University, Fresno	Fresno, California
**Epsilon**	1991	Cal Poly, San Luis Obispo	San Luis Obispo, California
**Zeta**	1991	University of California, Santa Barbara	Santa Barbara, California
Eta	1992	California State University, Bakersfield	Bakersfield, California
**Theta**	1993	Sonoma State University	Sonoma County, California
Iota	1994	Santa Clara University	Santa Clara, California
**Kappa**	1994	San Diego State University	San Diego, California
Lambda	1995	San Francisco State	San Francisco, California
Mu	1997	California State University, Chico	Chico, California
Nu	1998	University of San Francisco	San Francisco, California
Xi	2000	University of California, Riverside	Riverside, California
**Omicron**	2001	California State University, Northridge	Northridge, California
**Pi**	2001	California State University, Stanislaus	Stanislaus County, California
Rho	2001	California State University, Monterey Bay	Monterey County, California
Sigma	2001	University of California, Berkeley	Berkeley, California
**Tau**	2002	California State University, Long Beach	Long Beach, California
Upsilon	2003	University of California, Los Angeles	Los Angeles, California
Phi	2004	California State University, Fullerton	Fullerton, California
Chi	2010	University of California, Irvine	Irvine, California
Psi	2012	National Hispanic University	San Jose, California
**Omega**		Eternal Chapter	
**Alpha Alpha**	2012	Arizona State University	Tempe, Arizona
Alpha Beta	2015	California State University, East Bay	Hayward, California
Alpha Gamma	2015	Notre Dame de Namur University	Belmont, California
**Alpha Delta**	2025	University of Oregon	Eugene Oregon

== See also ==
- List of social sororities and women's fraternities
- Cultural interest fraternities and sororities
