= Alpha Epsilon Phi =

North American sorority

- ΑΕΦ
- Founded: October 24, 1909; 116 years ago Barnard College
- Type: Social
- Affiliation: NPC
- Status: Affiliation
- Emphasis: Judaic Values
- Scope: National
- Motto: Multa Corda, Una Causa; Many Hearts, One Purpose
- Slogan: Above All Else
- Colors: Green and White
- Symbol: Columns
- Flower: Lily of the Valley
- Jewel: Pearl
- Publication: Columns
- Philanthropy: Elizabeth Glaser Pediatric AIDS Foundation, Sharsheret
- Chapters: 50
- Nickname: AEPhi
- Mascot: Giraffe
- Headquarters: 11 Lake Avenue Extension Suite 1A; Danbury, CT 06811; USA
- Website: aephi.org

Alpha Epsilon Phi (ΑΕΦ or AEPhi) is an American national sorority and a member of the National Panhellenic Conference. It is the second Jewish sorority formed in the United States of America.

== History ==
Seven Jewish Barnard College students founded the sorority in 1909. The sorority promotes community service, academic presence on campuses, a stronger and more positive social presence and reputation, and provides a "college home and family" for each of its sisters. "It was her (Helen Phillips') idea and her persistence more than anything else that brought Alpha Epsilon Phi into existence," one founder wrote. "I sometimes think that some of those ties were more necessary to Helen than to the others in this group because Helen had no mother and no sisters or brothers, and to her, a group of adopted sisters was more of a need and had more significance."

In 1951, the sorority joined the National Panhellenic Conference.

The sorority celebrated their centennial at Barnard College in 2009.

== Symbols ==
The founders of the sorority picked the pearl as the sorority jewel because it is attractive and grows bigger over time. The colours green and white were also chosen by the founders to symbolize growth and camaraderie, respectively. The flower, selected for its beauty and colour, is the final emblem of Alpha Epsilon Phi that can be directly credited to the founders. The Lily of the Valley's Hebrew translation is "שושנת העמקים."

The columns of Alpha Epsilon Phi were added in 1916, the sorority's seventh year in existence. It was decided to create a simple insignia as opposed to a more elaborate crest like that of other Greek letter organizations. Each column of the insignia holds special significance to the members. The three columns Α, Ε, and Φ represent faculty approval, student esteem, and sorority fidelity, in order.

At the 1977 National Convention, the sorority chose the giraffe as their mascot. The Alpha Kappa Chapter at Miami University suggested this mascot, which was chosen because it stands the tallest and has the largest heart.

Women who have passed their new membership period and are initiated as full sisters receive a 24-karat gold badge with A, E, and Φ, on the front with 27 pearls. Α has eight pearls, Ε has nine pearls, and Φ has 10 pearls. On the back are the new sister's initials.

=== Motto, handshake, and tagline ===
"Multa Corda, Una Causa", meaning "Many Hearts, One Purpose", was the open motto in the early years of the sorority to express the intentions of the founders of Alpha Epsilon Phi.

Sisters, following the standard for sororities, have a handshake to greet one another and prove they are members of the sisterhood.

In 2001, the sorority unveiled its updated image, complete with a new tagline: "Above All Else". In full, the "Core Values Statement" is as follows: "Above all else, Alpha Epsilon Phi inspires exemplary women who are: enriched by sisterhood and unconditional friendships; dedicated to selfless service and inspiring others, and committed to intellectual growth and personal development. As a lifelong member of Alpha Epsilon Phi, I will: respect our shared heritage and traditions; exhibit high ideals and moral character; fulfill the expectations and responsibilities of membership; and continuously exemplify the values of beauty, strength and wisdom as embodied by the three columns of our insignia."

== National philanthropies ==
=== Elizabeth Glaser Pediatric AIDS Foundation ===
The Elizabeth Glaser Pediatric AIDS Foundation (abbreviated EGPAF) is a public charity which "seeks to prevent pediatric HIV infections and to eradicate pediatric AIDS through research, advocacy, and prevention and treatment programs”. It was founded in 1988 by Elizabeth Glaser (a member of AEPhi's Sigma chapter), Susan DeLaurentis, and Susie Zeegen (a member of AEPhi's Xi chapter). There are over 15 nations that work with the Elizabeth Glaser Pediatric Aids Foundation.

While a student at the University of Wisconsin-Madison, Elizabeth Glaser pledged AEPhi. Glaser became infected with HIV in 1981 after receiving a blood transfusion during delivery. Glaser and her husband, Paul, subsequently discovered that she unknowingly transmitted the virus to her children, Ariel and Jake. In 1988, the Glasers lost one of their children, seven-year-old Ariel, to an AIDS-related illness, and to memorialize their child, they founded the Pediatric AIDS Foundation with their friends Susie Zeegen and Susan DeLaurentis.

AEPhi recognizes it as one of its national philanthropies. Sorority members carry on Elizabeth's legacy by raising awareness of pediatric AIDS on their campuses through fundraising events and volunteer work.

=== Sharsheret ===
Sharsheret is one of Alpha Epsilon Phi's national charitable partners. It is a national non-profit organization dedicated to serving young Jewish women with breast cancer. Hebrew for "chain", Sharsheret acts as a link between all young Jewish women and their families who face breast cancer. It was founded in November 2001 by Rochelle Shorentz, a Law Clerk to the United States Supreme Court Justice Ruth Bader Ginsburg, a sister of Alpha Epsilon Phi. After the Supreme Court Justice was diagnosed with breast cancer at 28 years old, she researched the disease's prognosis in young Jewish women and families with Rochelle Shorentz, and the two partnered together to combat over 23,000 breast and ovarian cancer cases.

Sharsheret's contributions to women's health earned the organization the New York State Innovation in Breast Cancer Early Detection and Research Award, and it was selected as a member of the LIVESTRONG Young Adult Alliance. Rochelle Shorentz was brought onto the Federal Advisory Committee on Breast Cancer in Young Women by the Centers for Disease Control and Prevention honorary members. Sharsheret inspired the launching of a national ovarian cancer organization. By interacting with young Jewish families, women, and men, Sharsheret recognizes the increasing need for knowledge about breast and ovarian cancers. The organization hosts a variety of national events, such as the 2013 NYC Schlep: Jewish Breast & Ovarian Cancer Run/Walk in New York City's Bryant Park.

== Membership ==
Alpha Epsilon Phi currently has 49 active collegiate chapters across the United States and Canada. Alumnae groups exist across various areas and have events to celebrate their Founder's Day, socialize, or interact with other local Panhellenic alumnae groups.

The sorority has a magazine to chronicle news relevant to the organization. First published in November 1917 as Alpha Epsilon Phi Quarterly, later the title was changed to Columns in the late 1920s. It is published semiannually in the fall and spring seasons and is sent to collegians, alumnae volunteers, donors, subscribers, inter-fraternal partners and friends. Fraternity and sorority professionals and vice presidents of student affairs on campuses with chapters of Alpha Epsilon Phi also receive issues of the magazine. Families contribute to Columns to support philanthropic events and activities that current members, alumnae, family members, and friends can participate in contributing from the Atlantic to the Pacific.

=== Organizational structure ===
Each collegiate chapter of Alpha Epsilon Phi has an executive board made up of the following positions, elected each calendar year:

President: In charge of overseeing all of the chapter's activities, reporting to advisers and other members of nationals, as well as representing the sorority at Greek and college-wide events. The president presides over all chapter meetings and runs executive board meetings. The president oversees the activity of the Vice presidents. President must have had prior experience serving on the executive board in order to be elected.

VP Operations: In charge of all operational tasks for the chapter and serves as the second in command. This includes maintaining the listserv, taking minutes at each meeting, and attends weekly chapter meetings as well as other chapter events. VP Operations is in charge of all scheduling tasks for the chapter and serves as the secretary for the executive board.

VP Standards: In charge of enforcing the chapter's by-laws and constitution. VP Standards deal with any judicial issues that come up with sisters of the chapter, such as violations of social policy, attendance, or financial issues. VP Standards presides over standards hearings and has members from each class who sit on the standards board.

VP Finance: In charge of setting and collecting members' dues as well as financing from nationals and the university. VP Finance is in charge of setting the chapter's budget for each semester and is in charge of reimbursing chapter members. VP Finance is responsible for paying anyone owed by the chapter (venues, t-shirt distributors, etc.)

VP Recruitment: Organizes all recruitment events as well as the details that correspond with them, such as finance, attendance, etc., votes and works with nationals and Panhellenic to establish total and quota. VP Recruitment is responsible for setting up the appropriate recruitment events during an "off semester".

VP New Member Education: In charge of all new member events that occur during the pledge process. Holds new member meetings and new member events, and serves as the liaison between sisters and new members. VP New Member Education handles all issues the new members may have during the pledge process and is responsible for corresponding with the chapter adviser and nationals during the pledge process.

VP Programming: Responsible for setting up events for the chapter with on-campus residences, the overall university Panhellenic and Inter-Greek Community (IGC) boards, and the sonorities' national philanthropies. These include educational events as well as philanthropic events.

VP Philanthropy: Responsible for planning and organizing philanthropic events to support AEPhi's national charities, Sharsharet, and the Elizabeth Glaser Pediatric AIDS Foundation. The VP Philanthropy also coordinates community service events with other chapters on campuses.

=== Notable members ===
- Barbara Barrie (Omega) – actress; (Barney Miller)
- Marilyn Beck (Xi) – Hollywood columnist and author
- Carol Lynn Blum (Alpha Eta) – 1965 Miss Florida, third runner up Miss America 1966
- Lillian Copeland (Xi) – Olympic Gold and Silver medalist in discus; set world records in discus, javelin, and shot put
- Miriam Freund-Rosenthal (Zeta) American Jewish civic leader
- Ruth Bader Ginsburg (Kappa) – Supreme Court Justice
- Elizabeth Glaser (Sigma) – AIDS activist and co-founder of The Elizabeth Glaser Pediatric AIDS Foundation
- Nancy Goodman Brinker (Mu) – Founder of the Susan G. Komen Foundation for Breast Cancer Research; appointed in 2001 as Ambassador to Hungary
- Erica Hill (Alpha Chi) – CNN anchor
- Randi Kaye (Alpha Chi) – reporter and CNN anchor
- Bessie Margolin (Epsilon) – former U.S. Department of Labor attorney
- Stacey Nuveman (Phi) – Gold medalist for Softball at the 2000 Summer Olympics
- Dayssi Olarte de Kanavos (Kappa) – socialite, philanthropist, real estate executive
- Charlotte Rae (Omicron) – actress; (Diff'rent Strokes, The Facts of Life)
- Nan Rich (Alpha Tau) – former member of the Florida House of Representatives and Florida Senate
- Judith Resnik (Alpha Nu) – 2nd American woman astronaut
- Dinah Shore (Chi) – singer, actress and talk show host
- Annette Strauss (Omega) – former mayor of Dallas
- Carmen Warschaw (Phi) – California philanthropist and politician
- Bonnie Glick (Kappa) - politician, diplomat, and businesswoman
- Lauren Weisberger (Kappa) – author, (The Devil Wears Prada)
- Harriett Woods (Pi) – former Lt. Governor of Missouri

== See also ==
- List of Jewish fraternities and sororities
- List of social fraternities and sororities
- National Panhellenic Conference
