= Alpha Psi Rho =

American Pacific Islander fraternity

- ΑΨΡ
- Founded: March 1, 2000; 26 years ago San Diego State University
- Type: Social
- Affiliation: Independent
- Status: Active
- Emphasis: Asian-Pacific Islander
- Scope: Regional
- Motto: "Always Be Bold and Strong"
- Pillars: Brotherhood, Academics, Prosperity, and Strength
- Colors: Navy Blue and Gold
- Symbol: Doberman
- Publication: Alpha Psi Rho Monthly Newsletter
- Philanthropy: Underprivileged youth
- Chapters: 4
- Members: 60+ active 600+ lifetime
- Nickname: APsiRho, Rho Doggs, Brhos
- Headquarters: 5500 Campanile Drive; San Diego, California 92182; United States
- Website: alphapsirho.org

Alpha Psi Rho (ΑΨΡ), also known as APsiRho, is an Asian and Pacific Islander-interest fraternity founded at San Diego State University in 2000. It has expanded to include four chapters located in California and Nevada.

== History ==
The student founders of Alpha Psi Rho grew up in an era when Asian and Pacific Islander Americans were struggling to find their identities in the United States. Although the founders became involved in cultural organizations at San Diego State University, they wanted to create a group people who have similar interests, lived a similar lifestyle, and hungered to make greater impacts in the community.

The Ten Founding Fathers established Alpha Psi Rho on March 1, 2000, as a fraternity for Asian and Pacific Islander students. The fraternity was based on four pillars: Brotherhood, Academics, Prosperity, and Strength. Although established as an Asian or Filipino fraternity, it welcomes all races.

The founding fathers of Alpha Psi Rho are:

- Benjamin Abiva
- Reuel Anday
- Jay Balanay
- Kenny Fong
- Anthony Gambol
- James Kuniyoshi
- Ryan Lucina
- Kenny Ortega
- Jeremy Quirante
- Jason Valoroso

The fraternity's Beta chapter was established by five students at California State University, Northridge in 2003. This followed by the Gamma chapter at California State University San Marcos. Gamma chapter started as a special interest group called BAPS on August 26, 2006, and was chartered as Alpha Psi Rho on February 22, 2012. The Delta chapter at the University of Nevada, Las Vegas was chartered on April 2, 2011. Alpha Psi Rho members are referred to as "brhothers".

The Gamma chapter won the university's Community Development and Lifelong Membership award for 2014-2015. The fraternity hosts events such as a cultural festival at California State University, San Marcus for Asian Pacific American Heritage Month and participated in the annual Festival of Communities at UNLV. Members also volunteer with charities that work with Asian-Pacific Islander youth.

The fraternity's national headquarters is located in San Diego, California. Its publication is the Alpha Psi Rho Monthly Newsletter.

== Symbols ==
The motto of Alpha Psi Rho is "Always Be Bold and Strong". The fraternity's pillars are brotherhood, academia, prosperity, and strength. Its colors are navy blue and gold. Its symbol is the Doberman. Its nicknames are APsiRho and Rho Doggs. Its publication is the Alpha Psi Rho Monthly Newsletter.

== Chapters ==
Active chapters are in bold, and inactive groups are in italics. There are currently 4 active chapters and 1 inactive colony.

Chapter	Chaptered date	Founding institution	Location	Status	References
**Alpha**	March 1, 2000	San Diego State University	San Diego, California	Active	
**Beta**	September 1, 2003	California State University, Northridge	Northridge, California	Active	
**Delta**	April 2, 2011	University of Nevada, Las Vegas	Las Vegas, Nevada	Active	
**Gamma**	February 22, 2012	California State University, San Marcos	San Marcos, California	Active	(Note: Gamma chapter started as a special interest group called BAPS on August 26, 2006, that became Alpha Psi Rho on February 22, 2012.)
Epsilon colony	January 12, 2013–2013	California State University, Fullerton	Fullerton, California	Inactive	

== See also ==
- Cultural interest fraternities and sororities
- List of Asian American fraternities and sororities
- List of social fraternities
