= List of Seattle University people =

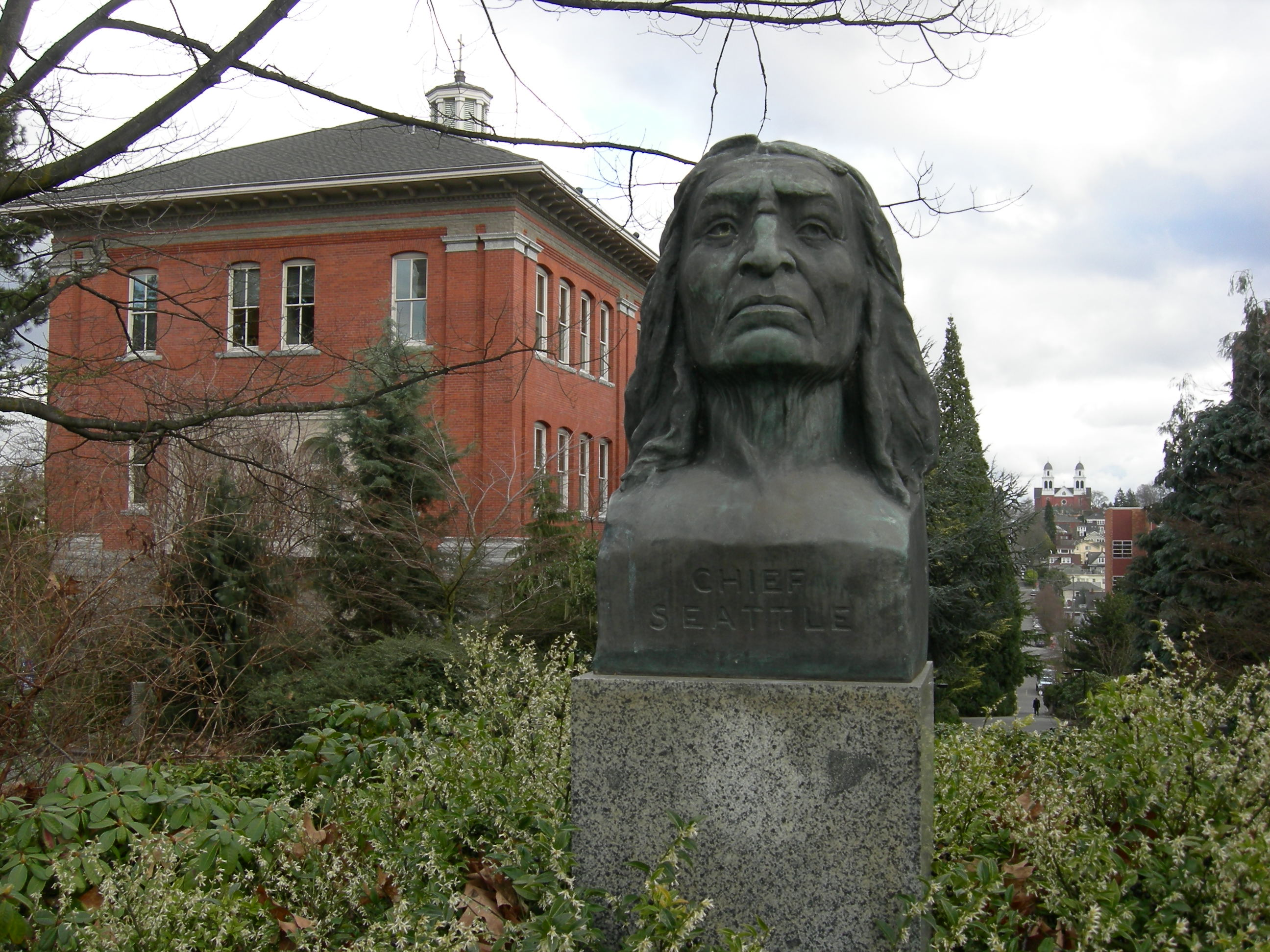
Chief of the Suquamish – Chief Seattle at Garrand Hall

This is a list of Seattle University people, including notable students, alumni, faculty, and administrators associated.

== Administration ==
Administrators who were also alumni are listed in bold font, with degree and year in parentheses.

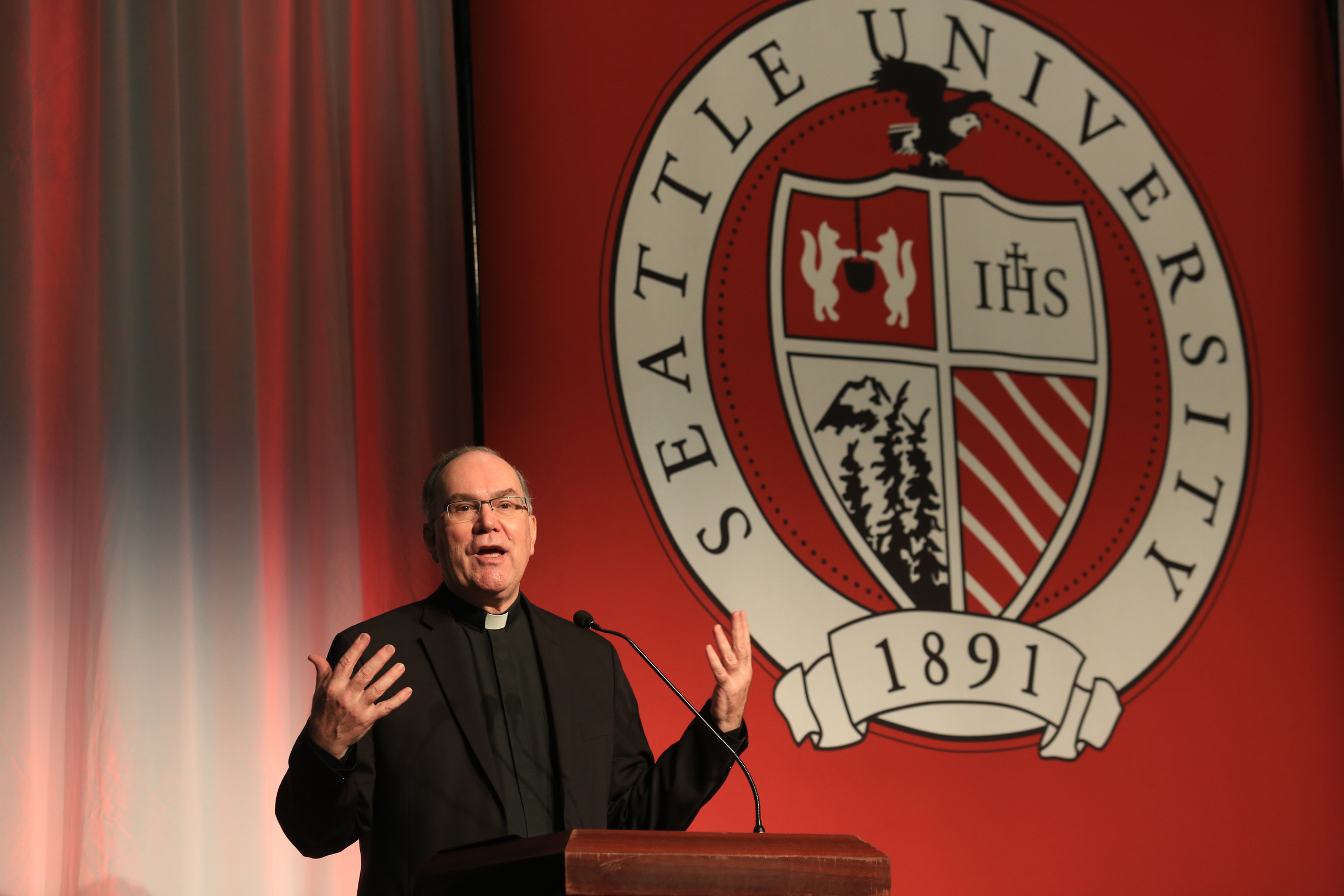
Stephen Sundborg, S.J., 21st president of Seattle University (1997–2021)

=== Presidents ===
- Walter James Fitzgerald, S.J., president of Seattle College (1929–31)
- Kenneth Baker, S.J., president of Seattle University (1970)
- Edmund Ryan, S.J., president of Seattle University (1975–1976)
- Stephen Sundborg, S.J., 21st president of Seattle University (1997–2021)
- Eduardo Peñalver, 22nd president of Seattle University (2021–present)

=== School deans ===
- **Annette Clark** (J.D. 1989), 9th dean of the Seattle University School of Law (2013–2022); professor of law

== Alumni ==
Alumni who were also faculty or administrators are listed in bold font, with degree and year. Alumni with a J.D. graduated from the Seattle University School of Law.

=== Academia ===
- Albert Ando (BS 1951), professor of economics and finance at the University of Pennsylvania (1967–2002)
- Millie Bown Russell (BS 1948), STEM diversity administrator at the University of Washington, first Black graduate of Seattle University
- Charles Chihara (BS 1954), professor of philosophy of mathematics and metaphysics at the University of California, Berkeley (1963–2000)
- **Annette Clark** (J.D. 1989), 9th dean of the Seattle University School of Law (2013–2022); professor of law
- David J. Danelski (BA 1955), professor emeritus of political science at Stanford University
- Tom Galligan, president emeritus of Louisiana State University (2020–2021), law professor of the Paul M. Hebert Law Center
- **Linda N. Hanson** (MA, Ed.D.), 19th president (2005–15) and president emerita of Hamline University, former Seattle University administrator
- Kent Kammerer (BA), Seattle teacher and neighborhood activist
- Richard Labunski (J.D.), professor emeritus of journalism at the University of Kentucky College of Communication & Information
- Charles H. Mitchell (MA 1974), chancellor of Seattle Colleges District (2003–08); president of Seattle Central Community College (1987–2003); NFL player for the Denver Broncos and Buffalo Bills
- Christine Sleeter (MA 1977), professor emerita at California State University, Monterey Bay

=== Arts and entertainment ===
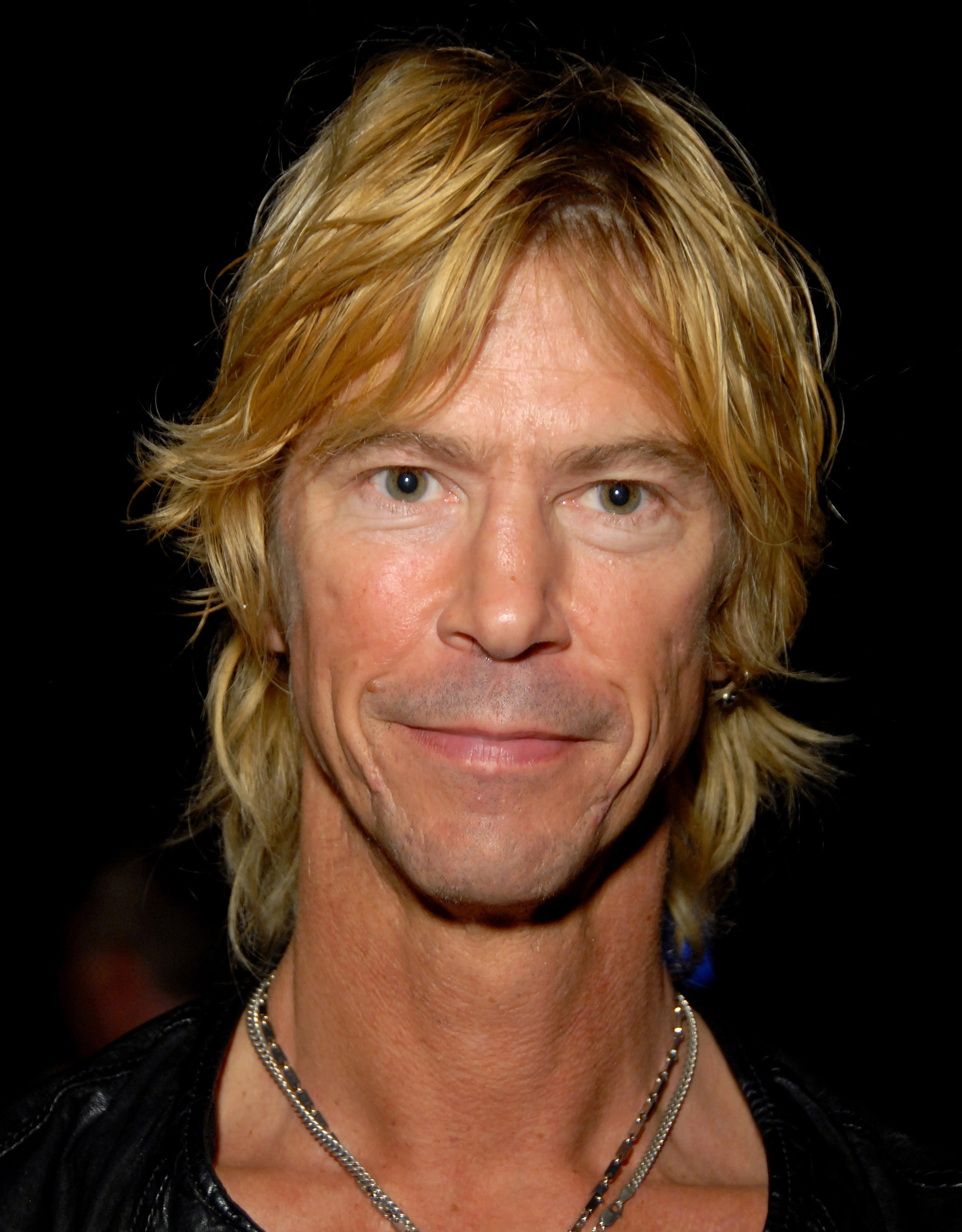
Duff McKagan, Guns N' Roses bassist

- Madeline Ashby (2005), science fiction writer; author of Company Town
- Johnny Horton, country singer and songwriter
- Carrie Imler, ballet dancer and teacher at Pacific Northwest Ballet
- Quincy Jones (1951, attended), record producer, songwriter, conductor, and arranger
- Fay King, cartoonist, illustrator, and journalist
- Karyna McGlynn, poet, editor, and professor
- Duff McKagan, bassist of Guns N' Roses and Velvet Revolver
- Rose Montoya (BA 2015), transgender activist and model
- Rebecca Morris (BA), true-crime author and journalist
- Scott Rains (MA), travel writer and disability rights advocate
- Gerri Russell, romantic fiction author
- Christopher Schaap (BA 2014), director, writer, and actor
- Thomas M. Sullivan, Fox Business anchor and Fox News Radio host
- Kaan Tangöze (MS), lead vocalist and guitarist of the Turkish rock band Duman
- Carolyne Wright (BA), poet

=== Business ===
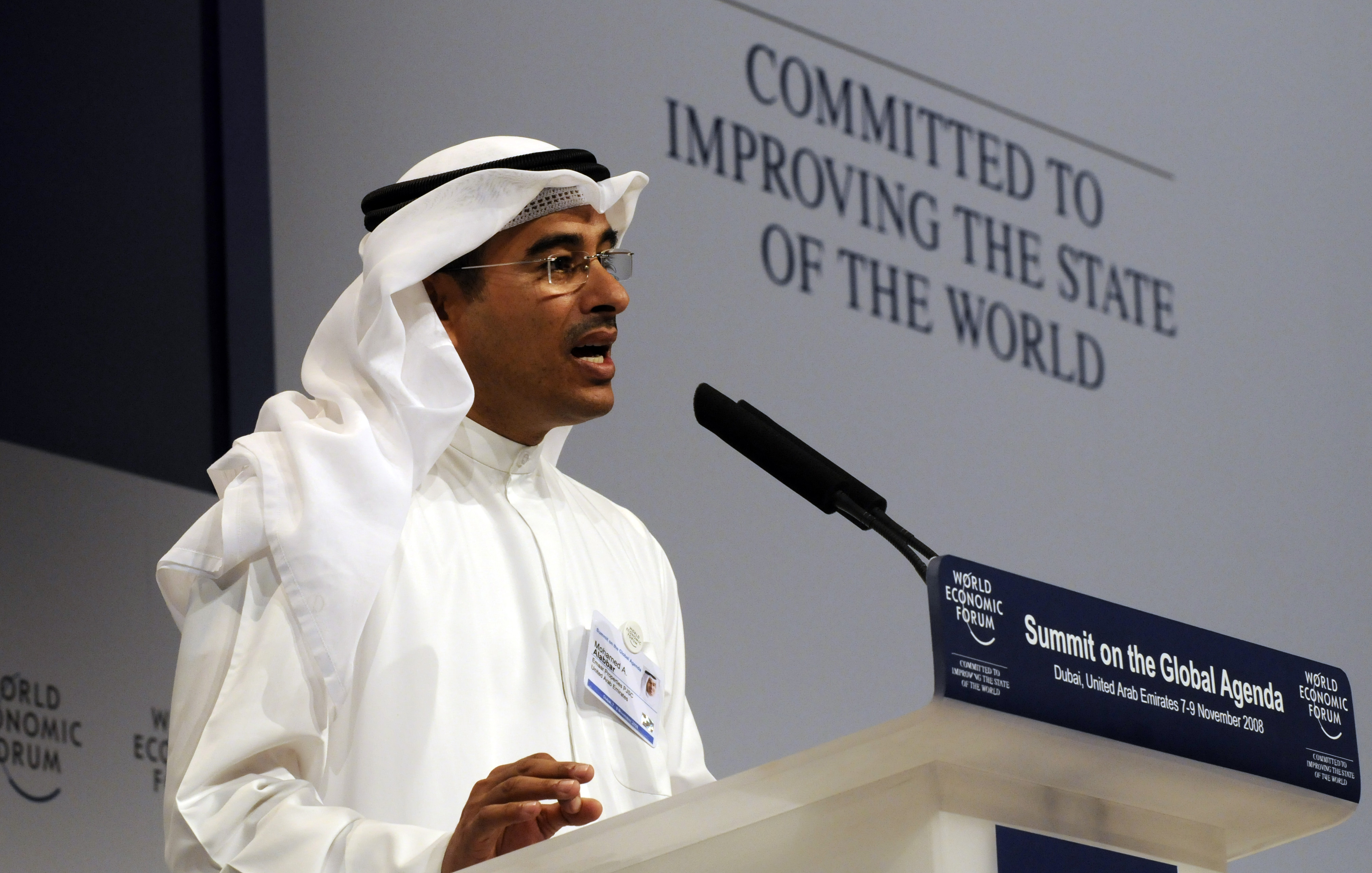
Mohamed Alabbar, '81, founder and chairman of Emaar Properties

- Yousef Al-Obaidly, CEO of beIN Media Group
- Mohamed Alabbar (BA 1981), founder and chairman of Emaar Properties, known for large-scale projects such as Burj Khalifa and Dubai Mall,
- John Barnett (attended), whistleblower known for his safety reports regarding the Boeing 787 Dreamliner
- Gary Brinson (BA 1966), founder and retired chairman of Brinson Partners
- Jerry Grundhofer (1965), former CEO and chairman of U.S. Bank
- S. K. Gupta (MBA), business executive
- Julie Larson-Green (MS 1992), CXO of Qualtrics, former CXO of Microsoft Office Experience Organization
- Emmanuel Lemelson (BA 1999), Greek Orthodox priest and hedge fund manager
- Carl Otto Løvenskiold (BA 1979), businessperson and heir to the Løvenskiold family of Dano-Norwegian nobility
- Mich Matsudaira (MPA 1977), businessperson and activist; first executive director of the Washington State Commission on Asian Pacific American Affairs
- Scott Rains (1991), consultant on inclusive travel
- Calvin Tang (BS 2000), co-founder of Newsvine

=== Government and politics ===
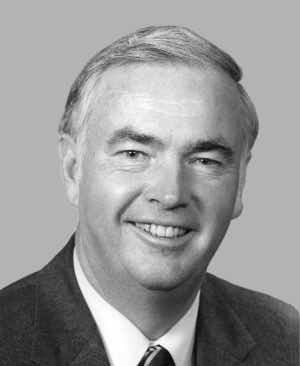
Frank Murkowski

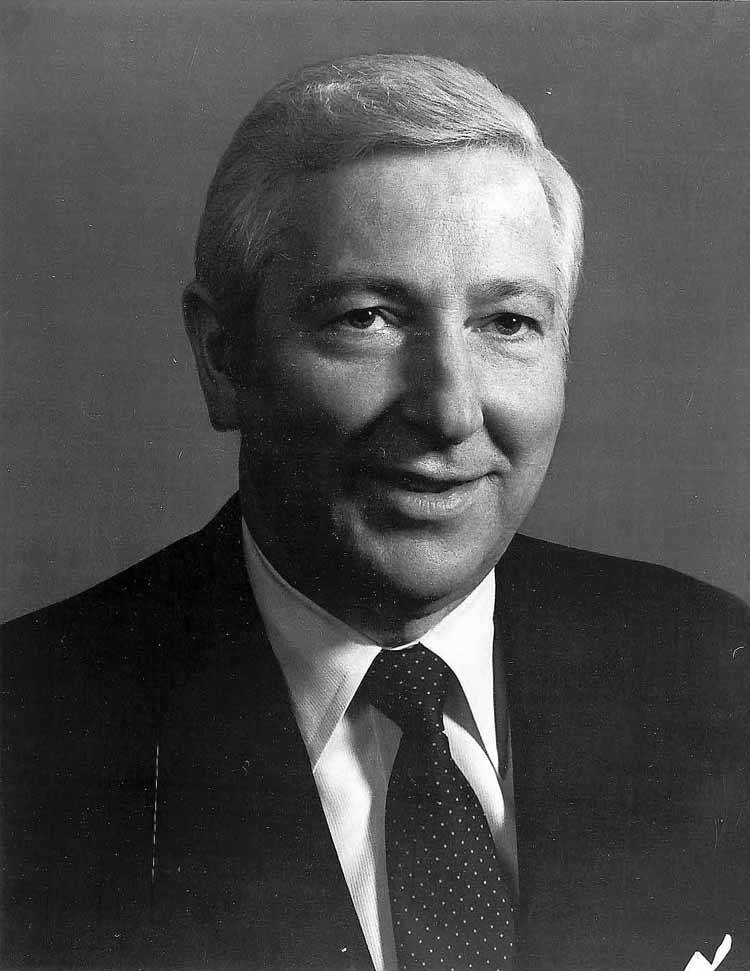
John Spellman

- Haitham Abdulrahman Al-Ohali (B.S.), vice minister of Communications and Information Technology of Saudi Arabia (2018–present); acting governor of Communications, Space and Technology Commission
- Marzouq Al-Ghanim (B.S.), speaker of the National Assembly of Kuwait (2013–22; 2023); member of the National Assembly of Kuwait (2006–12; 2013–22; 2023–24)
- Carl A. Anderson (BA), 13th Supreme Knight of the Knights of Columbus (2000–21); special assistant to President Ronald Reagan
- Wayne Angevine (BA), Washington state representative (1965–67); Washington state senator (1959–63)
- Andrew Barkis (BA 1990), Washington state representative (2016–present)
- Dave Barrett, 26th premier of British Columbia (1972–75); Canadian Parliament member (1988–93)
- Ann Bartlett, 17th First Lady of Oklahoma (1967–71)
- Farrah Chaichi (BA), Oregon state representative from the 35th district (2023–present)
- Martha Choe (MBA), Seattle City Councilmember (1992–99); Washington State Department of Commerce director (1999–2004); CAO of Gates Foundation (2004–14)
- Shasti Conrad (BA 2007), vice chair of the Democratic National Committee (2025–present) and Washington State Democratic Party chair (2023–present), first South Asian woman to chair a US state political party
- John E. Cunningham (1958), U.S. representative from WA-7 (1977–79); Washington state senator (1975–77); Washington state representative (1973–75)
- Joe Fain (MBA, J.D.), Washington state senator from the 47th district (2011–19)
- Fred Jarrett (MBA), Washington State Public Disclosure Commission member (2019–present); King County executive senior deputy (2010–19); Washington state senator (2009); Washington state representative (2001–09)
- Charles W. Johnson (jurist) (J.D. 1976). First graduate to be elected to the Washington Supreme Court. Was elected in 1990 and will serve through the end of 2026.
- Mike Kelly (1960–61; attended), Alaska state representative (2005–11); member (1991–99) and president (1996–98) of the University of Alaska system Board of Regents
- Keith Kreiman (BA 1976), Iowa state senator (2003–11); Iowa state representative
- August P. Mardesich (attended), Washington state senator from the 38th district (1963–78) and majority leader (1972–75); Washington State Representative (1950–63)
- Rosemary McAuliffe (BS), Washington state senator from the 1st district (1993–2017)
- Frank Murkowski (BS 1955), 8th governor of Alaska (2002–06); United States senator (1981–2002); 3rd Alaska commissioner of Economic Development (1966–70)
- Mike Murphy (BA 1969), 19th Washington state treasurer (1997–2009)
- Joe Nguyen (BA 2006), Washington state senator from the 34th district (2019–2025), WA state secretary of commerce (2025—present)
- Dino Rossi (1982), Washington state senator (1997–2003; 2012; 2016–17)
- Rebecca Saldaña (BA), Washington state senator from the 37th district (2017–present)
- Samuel J. Smith (1951), Washington state representative (1959–67); Seattle City Councilmember (1967–91), first Black person elected to the Seattle City Council, first Black student enrolled at Seattle University
- John Spellman (BA 1949), 18th governor of Washington (1981–85); 1st executive of King County (1969–81)
- Yasmin Trudeau (JD 2014). Washington State Senator.
- John Vincent (BA 1970), Montana House of Representatives (1975–90): speaker (1985–86, 1989–90), majority leader (1983–84), minority leader (1987–88), majority whip (1979–80); Bozeman, Montana: mayor (1994–95), commissioner (1992–95); Gallatin County (MT) Commission: chairman, commissioner (2001–06); and member, Montana Public Service Commission (2009–13)
- Rufus Yerxa (J.D. 1976), president of the National Foreign Trade Council (2016–21), deputy director general of the World Trade Organization (2002–13), deputy United States trade representative (1989–95)
- Paul Zellinsky (1955), Washington state representative from the 23rd district (1984–94; 96–98)

=== Law and justice ===
- Anne Bremner (J.D. 1982), Seattle lawyer and television legal analyst
- R. W. Buzzard (J.D. 2000), judge of the Lewis County District Court (2004–present)
- Joe Camacho (MPA), judge of the Northern Mariana Islands Superior Court (2011–present); Northern Mariana Islands representative (2007–11)
- Miguel S. Demapan (BS 1975), 3rd chief justice of the Supreme Court of the Commonwealth of the Northern Mariana Islands (1999–2011)
- Kymberly Evanson (BA 1999), judge of the United States District Court for the Western District of Washington (2023–present)
- Richard A. Jones (BPA 1972), senior judge (2022–present) and judge (2007–2022) of the United States District Court for the Western District of Washington; judge of the King County Superior Court (1994–2007)
- Peter Koski (BA 2000), trial attorney
- Charles Swift (J.D. 1994), attorney; United States Navy lieutenant commander (ret.)
- Jamal Whitehead (J.D. 2007), judge of the United States District Court for the Western District of Washington (2023–present)

=== Military ===
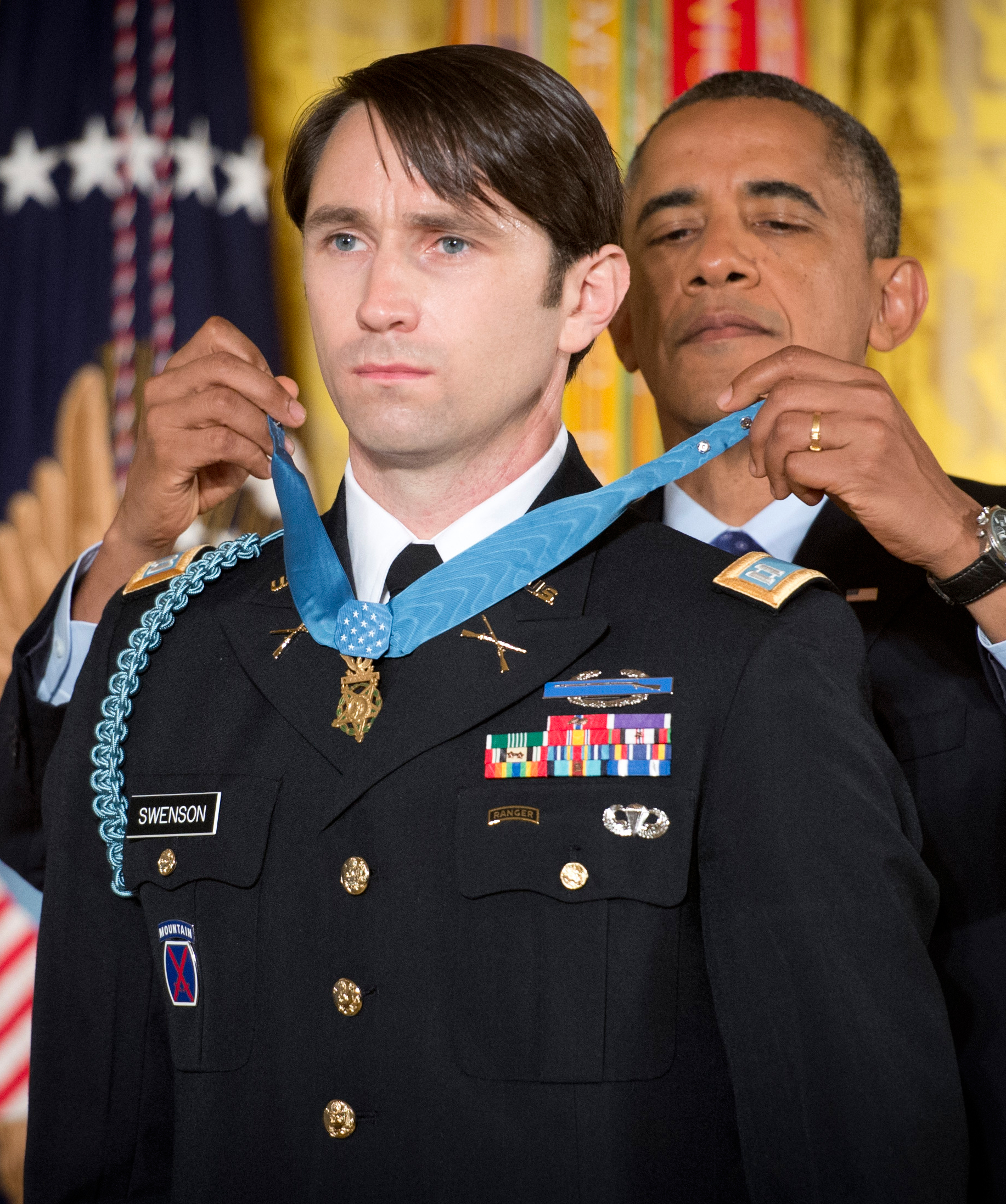
William D. Swenson,'01, first U.S. Army officer to receive the Medal of Honor since the Vietnam War

- Patrick Henry Brady, United States Army major general (ret.); recipient of the Medal of Honor
- Peter W. Chiarelli (BS 1972), 32nd vice chief of staff of the United States Army (2008–12); United States Army general (ret.)
- Bret D. Daugherty (BS 1980), adjutant general of Washington State (2012–present); United States Army major general
- William D. Swenson (2001), United States Army lieutenant colonel (ret.); recipient of the Medal of Honor

=== Science and technology ===
- John Hopcroft (BS 1961), theoretical computer scientist; 1986 Turing Award co-winner; 1994 ACM Fellow
- Steve McConnell (MS 1991), software engineering expert; author of Code Complete
- Robert Perry, yacht designer known for Tayana 37 and Valiant 40

=== Theology ===
- Catherine LaCugna (BA 1968), theologian and University of Notre Dame professor; author of God for Us
- William Meninger, O.C.S.O., Trappist monk known for Centering prayer method
- Francis Schuckardt (BA 1959), founder of the sedevacantist Tridentine Latin Rite Catholic Church
- Dan Schutte, composer of contemporary Catholic liturgical music known for "Here I Am, Lord"

=== Crime ===
- Mary Kay Letourneau (1989), teacher who pleaded guilty to two counts of second-degree rape of a child who had been her sixth-grade student

== Athletes ==
=== Baseball ===
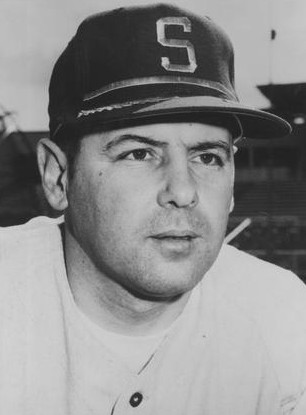
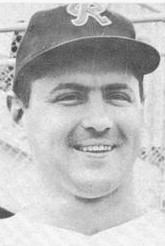
Eddie and Johnny O'Brien '52
- Eddie O'Brien (1952), player for Pittsburgh Pirates
- Johnny O'Brien (1952), player for Pittsburgh Pirates, St. Louis Cardinals and Milwaukee Braves
- Tarik Skubal, pitcher for Los Angeles Dodgers, two-time Cy Young Award winner (2024 and 2025)
- Tanner Swanson (MSAL), New York Yankees quality control coach and catching director

=== Basketball ===
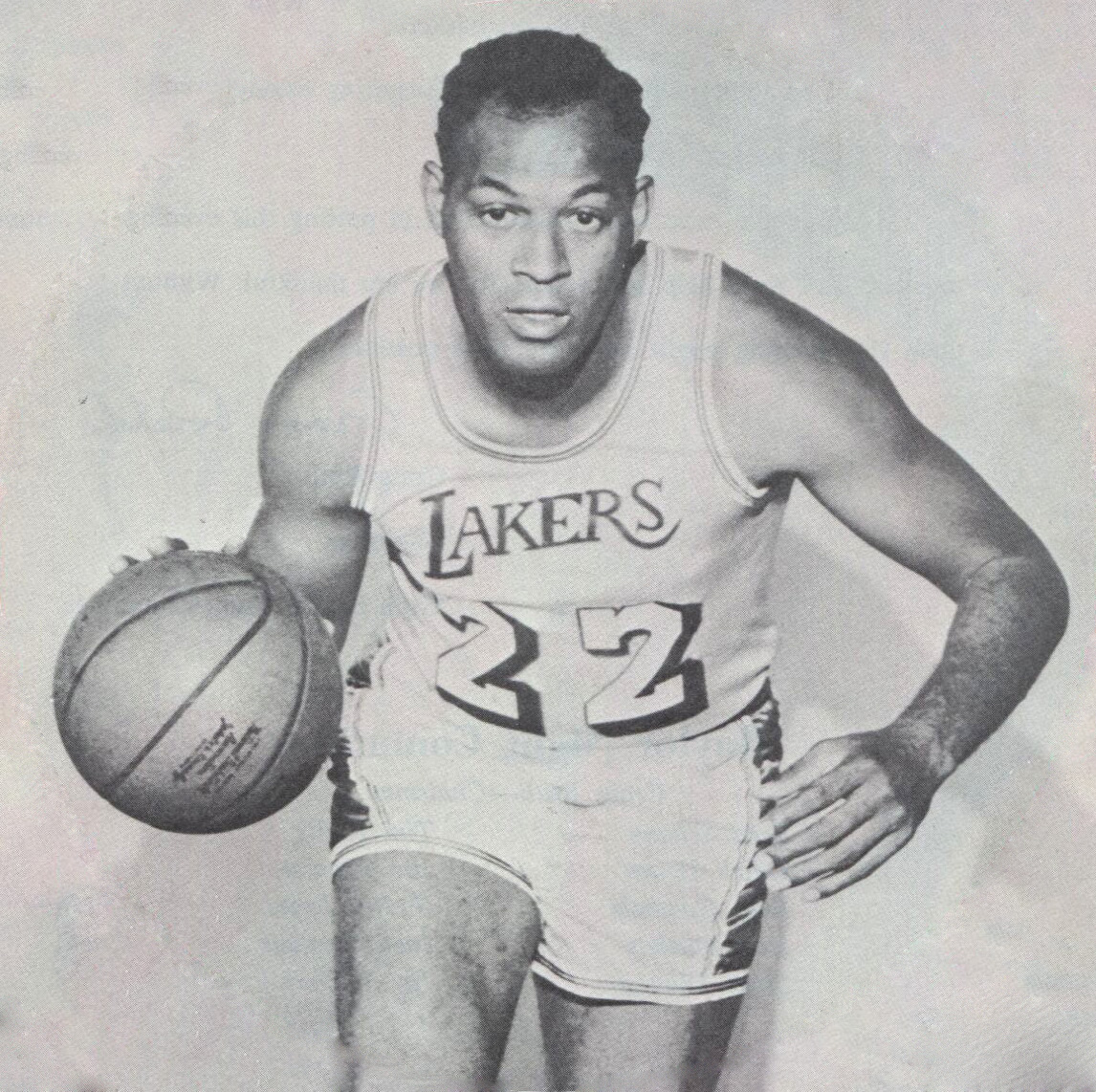
NBA Hall of Famer Elgin Baylor '58 played 13 seasons as a forward for the Los Angeles Lakers, appearing in eight NBA Finals.

- Elgin Baylor (1958), NBA Hall of Famer and general manager; 1958 No. 1 draft pick; Los Angeles Clippers 2006 NBA Executive of the Year
- Rudy D'Amico (1990), NBA basketball scout and former college and professional (Euroleague-winning) basketball coach
- Rod Derline (1974), NBA player for the Seattle SuperSonics
- Eddie Miles (1962), NBA player for the Detroit Pistons
- Johnny O'Brien (1953), 1953 All-American, NBA's Milwaukee Hawks draft pick and the first college player to score 1,000 points in a season
- Jawann Oldham (1979), NBA player for the Chicago Bulls
- Frank Oleynick, NBA player for the Seattle SuperSonics, WCC Player of the Year in 1974
- Clint Richardson (1978), NBA player for the Philadelphia 76ers
- John Tresvant (1964), NBA player for the Detroit Pistons
- Charlie Williams (1967), ABA player for the Pittsburgh Pipers
- Tom Workman (1967), NBA player for the Baltimore Bullets; 1967 No. 8 draft pick

=== Soccer ===
- Melissa Busque (2012), soccer player for CS Fabrose, Seattle Sounders, and Canadian national team
- Jason Cascio (BA 2008), USL soccer player for Seattle Sounders
- Sharon McMurtry, U.S. women's national soccer team member (1985–86); played basketball at Seattle University
- Alex Roldán (2017), soccer player for MLS team Seattle Sounders FC, and El Salvador national football team
- Cam Weaver (2005), MLS soccer player for Houston Dynamo FC and San Jose Earthquakes
- Wade Webber (MA), Tacoma Defiance assistant coach

=== Tennis ===
- Janet Hopps Adkisson (1956), tennis player
- Tom Gorman (1968), ATP tennis player

=== Other sports ===
- Ron Howard (1973), NFL player for the Dallas Cowboys, Seattle Seahawks and Buffalo Bills
- John Juanda (MBA 1996), professional poker player; winner of five World Series of Poker bracelets
- Jim Whittaker (1952), mountaineer; first American to summit Mount Everest in 1963

== Faculty ==
- Joaquin Avila, voting rights attorney and activist; directed National Voting Rights Advocacy Initiative at Seattle University School of Law
- Philip Boroughs, S.J., former Jesuit community rector and School of Theology & Ministry faculty member (1989–91)
- Anne Buttimer, OP, geographer; assistant professor of Geography (1966–68)
- Marie Cowan, nurse and academic; assistant professor at College of Nursing (1972–79)
- Richard Delgado, professor of law and critical race theory scholar
- Daniel Dombrowski, philosopher and former president of the Metaphysical Society of America; professor of Philosophy since 1988
- Edward Foley, O.F.M. Cap., visiting faculty at Seattle University Summer Liturgy Institute (2002–06; 2008)
- Robert L. Glass, software engineer; faculty member at Software Engineering graduate program (1982–87)
- Randy Gordon, Washington state senator from the 41st district (2010); adjunct professor of law since 1999
- Samuel Green, poet and bookbinder; first Poet Laureate of Washington; adjunct professor
- Gabriella Gutiérrez y Muhs, scholar and former Washington State Arts commissioner (2014–17); professor of Modern Languages and Cultures since 2000
- Allison Henrich, mathematician and knot theory scholar; professor of Mathematics since 2009
- Robert Higgs, economist and economic historian; professor of Economics (1989–94)
- Burt C. Hopkins, philosopher and Husserl scholar; professor of Philosophy (1989–2016)
- Nikkita Oliver, attorney and activist; 2017 candidate for mayor of Seattle; adjunct professor
- William O'Malley, S.J., theology professor and author; portrayed Father Dyer in The Exorcist
- Dean Spade, lawyer, writer, and trans activist; associate professor of Law
- Cyrus Vance Jr., district attorney of New York County (2010–present); former adjunct professor of Law

== See also ==
- Cornish College of the Arts notable alumni
