= Stefano Ceri =

Italian computer scientist (born 1955)

- Born: 14 February 1955 (age 71)
- Education: Politecnico di Milano
- Scientific career
- Workplaces: Politecnico di Milano; Stanford University
- Website: http://home.deib.polimi.it/ceri

Stefano Ceri (born 14 February 1955) is an Italian computer engineer and professor of database management at Politecnico di Milano. He has been visiting professor at Stanford University between 1983 and 1990, and received the ACM SIGMOD Edward Codd Innovations Award in 2013.

== Career ==
=== Stanford University ===
He was a visiting professor at Stanford University in the 1980s and 1990s.

=== Scientific Research ===
Some of the research projects he has been responsible for at Politecnico di Milano include W3I3: "Web-Based Intelligent Information Infrastructures" (1998–2000), WebSI: "Data Centric Web Services Integrator" (2002–2004), SeCo: Search Computing (2008–2013), GenData2020: Data-Centric Genomic Computing (2013–2016), and GeCo: Genomic Computing (2016–2021).

He received two European Research Council Advanced Grants, in 2008 for the Search Computing project and in 2016 for the Genomic Computing project.

His research interests are focused on:

- extending database technologies for incorporating data distribution, deductive rules, active rules, and query languages for XML
- methods and languages for the specification of data-intensive Web sites, such as WebML
- search computing and crowd searching methods
- genomic computing

=== WebML inventor ===
He is one of the inventors of WebML, a modeling language for the conceptual design of web applications (US Patent 6,591,271, July 2003) and he is one of the co-founders of WebRatio, a spinoff of Politecnico di Milano whose mission is to promote and commercialize development tools based on WebML and model-driven development in general (spanning Interaction Flow Modeling Language, BPMN, and Unified Modeling Language).

=== Alta Scuola Politecnica ===
Until November 2013, he was director of Alta Scuola Politecnica.

== Awards ==
- 1991 – VLDB Best Paper Award in 1991.
- 2000 – VLDB Test of Time Award in 2000.
- 2013 – ACM SIGMOD Edward F. Codd Innovations Award: During his ACM-Sigmod talk, he explained the "Seven Golden Rules for being Successful in Research". They are: (1) Invest in education, (2) Choose the right co-workers, (3) Take context into account when choosing your research agenda, (4) Write!, (5) Diversify your research, (6) Learn from other disciplines, (7) Don't always work.

== Membership ==
He is member of the Academia Europaea. In 2014 he became ACM fellow of the Association for Computing Machinery.

== Books ==
- Distributed Databases: Principles and Systems (McGraw-Hill, 1984)
- Logic Programming and Databases (Springer-Verlag, 1990)
- Conceptual Database Design: an Entity-Relationship Approach (Benjamin-Cummings, 1992)
- Active Database Systems (Morgan-Kaufmann, 1995)
- Advanced Database Systems (Morgan-Kaufmann, 1997)
- The Art and Craft of Computing (Addison-Wesley, 1997)
- Designing Database Applications with Objects and Rules: the IDEA Methodology (Addison-Wesley, 1997)
- Database Systems: Concepts, Languages, and Architecture (McGraw-Hill, 1999)
- Designing Data-Intensive Web Applications (Morgan Kaufmann, 2002)
- Web Information Retrieval (Springer-Verlag, 2013)
- Creating Innovation Leaders (Springer-Verlag, 2015)

== Patents ==
- Model for the definition of world wide web sites and method for their design and verification (US 6,591,271, July 2003, with P. Fraternali)
- Method for extracting, merging and ranking search engine results (US 8,180,768, May 2013, with D. Braga, M. Brambilla, A. Campi, E. Della Valle, P. Fraternali, D. Martinenghi, M. Tagliasacchi)
- Method and system of management of queries for crowd searching (US 8,825,701 B2, July 2014, with A. Bozzon, M. Brambilla)

== Didactic Projects ==
- He is interested in new multidisciplinary and interdisciplinary approaches in academic education (see the book Creating Innovation Leaders).
- He is responsible for Politecnico di Milano of Data-Shack, an experimental didactic project jointly developed with the Institute for Applied Computational Science (IACS) at Harvard John A. Paulson School of Engineering and Applied Sciences Harvard's School of Engineering and Applied Sciences (SEAS).

== Links ==
- Stefano Ceri Home page
- Search Computing project
- Crowdsearcher project
- Genomic Computing project
