= UML-based Web Engineering =

Web development software

UWE (UML-based Web Engineering) is a software engineering approach for the development of Web applications. UWE provides a UML profile (UML extension), a metamodel, model-driven development process and tool support for the systematic design of Web applications (MagicUWE). UWE follows the separation of concerns building separate models for requirements, content, navigation, presentation, process, adaptation and architecture.

The key aspects that distinguish UWE are reliance on OMG standards.

== Other possibilities ==
- WebML (Web Modeling Language)
- HDM
- RMM
- EORM
- OOHDM
- WSDM
- Araneus
- OO-H
- UML WAE
- Hera

== See also ==
- Web engineering
- Web modeling
