= Tsutomu Kanai Award =

Technical award

Tsutomu Kanai Award

The Tsutomu Kanai Award was established by the IEEE Computer Society in 1997 by an endowment from Hitachi, and named in honor of Tsutomu Kanai, who served as Hitachi's president for 30 years.

== Overview ==
The Kanai Award may be presented annually upon the recommendation of the Kanai Award subcommittee, endorsement of the Awards Committee and approval of the Board of Governors. The Kanai Award recognized major contributions to the state-of-the-art distributed computing systems and their applications. The award consisted of a crystal model, a certificate, and $10,000.

In the evaluation process, the following criteria were considered: seminal nature of the achievements, practical impact, breadth and depth of contributions, and quality of the nomination. Ken Thompson was the first Tsutomu Award winner in 1999 and Beng Chin Ooi was the last, in 2012; the award was discontinued afterwards.

== List of recipients ==
- 2012: Beng Chin Ooi
- 2011: Ian Foster
- 2009: Kenneth P. Birman
- 2008: Benjamin W. Wah
- 2007: Willy Zwaenepoel
- 2006: Larry Smarr
- 2005: Elisa Bertino
- 2004: Kane Kim
- 2003: James Gosling
- 2002: Stephen S. Yau
- 2001: Alfred Z. Spector
- 2000: C. V. Ramamoorthy
- 1999: Ken Thompson

== See also ==
- List of computer science awards
