= Robert Glass =

Robert Glass may refer to:

- Robert Glass (sound engineer) (1939–1993), American sound engineer and Academy Award winner
- Robert D. Glass (1922–2001), justice of the Connecticut Supreme Court
- Robert Frederick Glass (1951-2002), American computer analyst who killed Sharon Lopatka
- Robert L. Glass (born 1932), American software engineer and writer
- Robert W. Glass Jr. (fl. 1970s–1990s), American sound engineer
