= SIGMOD Edgar F. Codd Innovations Award =

The ACM SIGMOD Edgar F. Codd Innovations Award is a lifetime research achievement award given by the ACM Special Interest Group on Management of Data, at its yearly flagship conference (also called SIGMOD). According to its homepage, it is given "for innovative and highly significant contributions of enduring value to the development, understanding, or use of database systems and databases". The award has been given since 1992.

Until 2003, this award was known as the “SIGMOD Innovations Award.” In 2004, SIGMOD, with the unanimous approval of ACM Council, decided to rename the award to honor Dr. E.F. (Ted) Codd (1923 – 2003) who invented the relational data model and was responsible for the significant development of the database field as a scientific discipline.

== Recipients ==
Year	Name
2026	H. V. Jagadish
2025	Carlo Zaniolo
2024	Samuel Madden
2023	Joseph M. Hellerstein
2022	Dan Suciu
2021	Alon Halevy
2020	Beng Chin Ooi
2019	Anastasia Ailamaki
2018	Raghu Ramakrishnan
2017	Goetz Graefe
2016	Gerhard Weikum
2015	Laura M. Haas
2014	Martin L. Kersten
2013	Stefano Ceri
2012	Bruce Lindsay
2011	Surajit Chaudhuri
2010	Umeshwar Dayal
2009	Masaru Kitsuregawa
2008	Moshe Y. Vardi
2007	Jennifer Widom
2006	Jeffrey D. Ullman
2005	Michael Carey
2004	Ronald Fagin
2003	Don Chamberlin
2002	Patricia Selinger
2001	Rudolf Bayer
2000	Rakesh Agrawal
1999	Hector Garcia-Molina
1998	Serge Abiteboul
1997	David Maier
1996	C. Mohan
1995	David DeWitt
1994	Philip Bernstein
1993	Jim Gray
1992	Michael Stonebraker

== See also ==
- List of computer science awards
