= OOHDM =

OOHDM (Object-Oriented Hypermedia Design Method) is a method for the development of Web applications. It was one of the first methods to postulate the separation of concerns that defines its various models – requirements, conceptual, navigation, abstract interface and implementation. OOHDM, and its successor, SHDM (Semantic Hypermedia Design Method, which uses Semantic Web models) are supported by an open source, freely available environment, HyperDE.

== See also ==
- Web engineering
- Web modeling
