= Willy Zwaenepoel =

Belgian computer scientist

Willy Zwaenepoel is a Belgian computer scientist. He is a professor of computer science at the University of Sydney.

== Early life and education ==
Willy Zwaenepoel was born in Oostende, Belgium, in 1956. He grew up in Bredene, Belgium. He went to secondary school at the Onze-Lieve-Vrouwecollege in Oostende. He received his BS/MS in electrical engineering from Ghent University in 1979, his MS in computer science from Stanford University in 1980, and his Ph.D. in electrical engineering, also from Stanford University, in 1984.

== Academic career ==
He joined Rice University as an assistant professor in 1984, became an associate professor in 1989 and a full professor in 1993. He received a Noah Harding chair in 2000 and a Karl F. Hasselmann chair in 2000. From 1997 to 1999, he was associate director of the Rice Computer and Information Technology Institute (CITI), now called the Ken Kennedy Institute, and served as its director from 1999 to 2002. He left Rice University in 2002 to become the inaugural dean of the School of Computer and Communication Sciences at École Polytechnique Fédérale de Lausanne in Switzerland, a position which he held until 2011, at which time he returned to teaching and research as a professor at the same school. In 2018 he became dean of the Faculty of Engineering at the University of Sydney, a position he held until 2024, after which he again returned to teaching and research as a professor of computer science at the University of Sydney, a position which he currently holds. In addition to these positions, he was a visiting professor at the University of Technology Sydney in 1990, INRIA Rocquencourt in 1991, ETH Zurich in 1998, the National University of Singapore in 1998, Stanford University in 2011-12, and INRIA Grenoble in 2024-25 .

== Honors and awards ==
- Fellow of IEEE, 1998.
- Fellow of ACM, 2000.
- Rice University Graduate Student Association Teaching Award, 2001.
- IEEE Tsutomu Kanai Award, 2007.
- Member, Academia Europaea, 2008.
- Foreign Member, Royal Flemish Academy of Belgium for Science and the Arts, 2011.
- SwissICT Award, 2012.
- Eurosys Lifetime Achievement award, 2019.
- Fellow, Australian Academy of Technology and Engineering, 2020.
- IEEE TCDP Outstanding Technical Achievement Award, 2022.
- IEEE Harry H. Goode Memorial Award, 2024.
- Fellow, Australian Academy of Science, 2024.
