= IEEE Innovation in Societal Infrastructure Award =

IEEE award

- Sponsored by: Institute of Electrical and Electronics Engineers
- First award: 2011
- Website: IEEE Innovation in Societal Infrastructure Award

The IEEE Innovation in Societal Infrastructure Award is a Technical Field Award established by the IEEE Board of Directors in 2011. The IEEE Technical Field Awards are awarded for contributions or leadership in specific fields of interest of the IEEE.

This award is typically presented to an individual or a team of up to three people. Recipients of this award receive a bronze medal, certificate, and honorarium. See for list of recipients and their citations.

== Recipients ==
- 2014: Balaji Prabhakar "For his demonstration of the innovative use of information technology and distributed computing systems to solve long-standing societal problems, in areas ranging from transportation to healthcare and recycling."
- 2015: Takemochi Ishii and Hirokazu Ihara and Atsunobu Ichikawa "For pioneering the concept of dependable autonomous decentralized systems and contributing to its practical application in early transport control systems."
- 2016: William H. Sanders "For the assessment-driven design of trustworthy cyber infrastructures for electric grid systems."
- 2017: Antonello (Anto) Monti "For accelerating innovation of energy, information, and communication technologies for the urban environment."
- 2018: David F. Ferraiolo, D. Richard Kuhn, and Ravi Sandhu "For advancing the foundations and practice of information security through creation, development, and technology transfer of role-based access control (RBAC)."
- 2019: Andy Vidan, Paul Breimyer, and Gregory G. Hogan "For development of real-time collaborative and distributed emergency response and recovery systems."
- 2020: Masaru Kitsuregawa
- 2021: Elisa Bertino
- 2022: M. Tamer Özsu
- 2023: Kathleen McKeown
- 2024: Elena Ferrari
- 2025: Wen Gao
- 2026: Moti Yung
- 2027: Xiaoqian Jiang and Lucila Ohno-Machado and Jaideep Vaidya for "Designing and deploying privacy-preserving distributed clinical research infrastructures enabling secure large-scale health data collaboration"
