= Web modeling =

Web modeling (a.k.a. model-driven Web development) is a branch of Web engineering that addresses the specific issues related to design and development of large-scale Web applications. In particular, it focuses on the design notations and visual languages that can be used for the realization of robust, well-structured, usable and maintainable Web applications.

== Models ==
Designing a data-intensive website amounts to specifying its characteristics in terms of various orthogonal abstractions. The main models that are involved in complex Web application design are: data structure, content composition, navigation paths, and presentation model. Several languages and notations have been devised for Web application modeling. One influential example is WebML, which was proposed as a conceptual notation for specifying complex web sites and separating their structure, hypertext/navigation and presentation models. Among them:

- RMM
- OOHDM
- ARANEUS
- STRUDEL
- TIRAMISU
- HDM — W2000
- the Interaction Flow Modeling Language (IFML), adopted by the Object Management Group (OMG) in March 2013
- WebML
- Hera
- UML Web Application Extension
- UML-based Web Engineering (UWE)
- ACE
- WebArchitect
- OO-H

One of the main discussion venues for this discipline is the Model-Driven Web Engineering Workshop (MDWE) held yearly in conjunction with the International Conference on Web Engineering (ICWE) conference.
