= Elisa Bertino =

American academic

Elisa Bertino is a professor of computer science at Purdue University where is acting as the research director of CERIAS, the Center for Education and Research in Information Assurance and Security. In May 2026 she was elected President of the Association for Computing Machinery, the world's largest association of computing professionals. Bertino's research interests include data privacy and computer security.

== Education ==
Bertino received her Ph.D. from the University of Pisa in 1980 under the supervision of Costantino Thanos. After postdoctoral research on IBM System R at the IBM Almaden Research Center, and then working for the Microelectronics and Computer Technology Corporation, she returned to academia. She was for many years on the faculty of the University of Milan, and chaired the computer science department there.

== Publications ==
She has authored or co-authored more than 250 journal articles, more than 450 conference papers, 9 books, and 35 edited volumes, with over 300 co-authors. She has been co-editor-in-chief of the GeoInformatica Journal and VLDB Journal, program co-chair of ICDE 1998, and program chair of ECOOP 2000, SACMAT 2002, and EDBT 2004.

== Honors and awards ==
- 2002 - Elected as a fellow of the Institute of Electrical and Electronics Engineers "for contributions to the theory of object-oriented databases, temporal databases, and database security."
- 2003 - Became a fellow of the Association for Computing Machinery "for contributions to secure database systems".
- 2002 - Winner of an IEEE Technical Achievement Award
- 2005 - Winner of IEEE Computer Society Tsutomu Kanai Award
- 2019 - Recipient of the Association for Computing Machinery Athena Lecturer Award
- 2021 - IEEE Innovation in Societal Infrastructure Award
