= William W. Destler =

American university professor and administrator

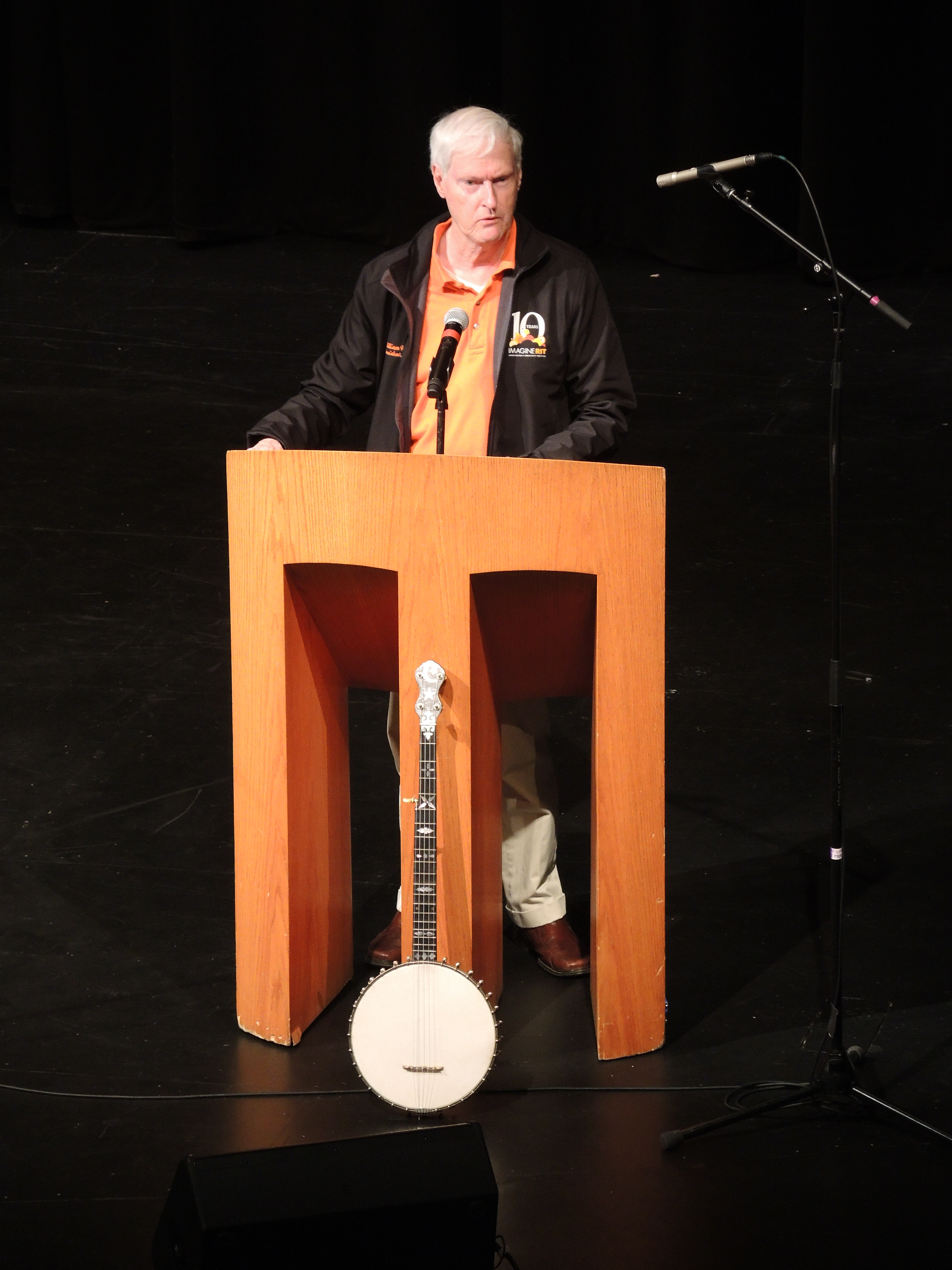
- President of RIT, William Destler

9th President of the Rochester Institute of Technology
- In office July 1, 2007 – June 30, 2017
- Preceded by: Albert J. Simone
- Succeeded by: David C. Munson

Personal details
- Born: 26 August 1946 (age 80)
- Citizenship: United States
- Education: Stevens Institute of Technology; Cornell University

William Wallace Destler (born August 26, 1946) is an American university professor and administrator who served as the ninth president of the Rochester Institute of Technology (RIT) from July 1, 2007, to June 30, 2017.

== Education ==
Destler received his bachelor's degree from the Stevens Institute of Technology in 1968 and a Ph.D. in applied physics from Cornell University in 1972. His research specialized in high-power microwave sources and advanced accelerator technologies.

== Career at the University of Maryland ==
Before joining RIT, Destler spent more than three decades at the University of Maryland, College Park. He served as a professor of electrical engineering, dean of the engineering school (1994–1997), dean of the graduate school (1999–2001), and provost and senior vice president for academic affairs (2001–2007).

== Presidency of RIT ==
As president, Destler oversaw a period of significant growth at RIT. In 2010, he approved the transition from RIT's quarter system to a semester system, which took effect in 2013.

In May 2016, Destler announced his retirement from the presidency effective June 30, 2017. He was succeeded by David C. Munson.

== Personal life ==
Destler is a collector of antique banjos, with a collection of more than 160 instruments spanning from the 1840s to the 1920s. He is also an amateur folk musician and a member of the Baltimore Folk Music Society. Destler released his first album, September Sky, on the Swallowtail label in 1973; it was later re-released on CD in South Korea in 2009 and in Japan in 2010.

Destler has an interest in electric and hybrid vehicles. As a Chevrolet Volt owner, he co-hosted a public seminar at RIT on the technology behind the vehicle alongside Golisano Institute for Sustainability director Nabil Nasr and representatives from General Motors. He has publicly advocated for electric vehicle adoption, arguing that the efficiency advantage of electric drivetrains makes them a practical alternative to gasoline-powered cars.

Academic offices
| Preceded by Albert J. Simone | President of the Rochester Institute of Technology; July 1, 2007 – June 30, 2017 | Succeeded by David C. Munson |
