= Wen Gao =

Chinese computer engineer (born 1956)

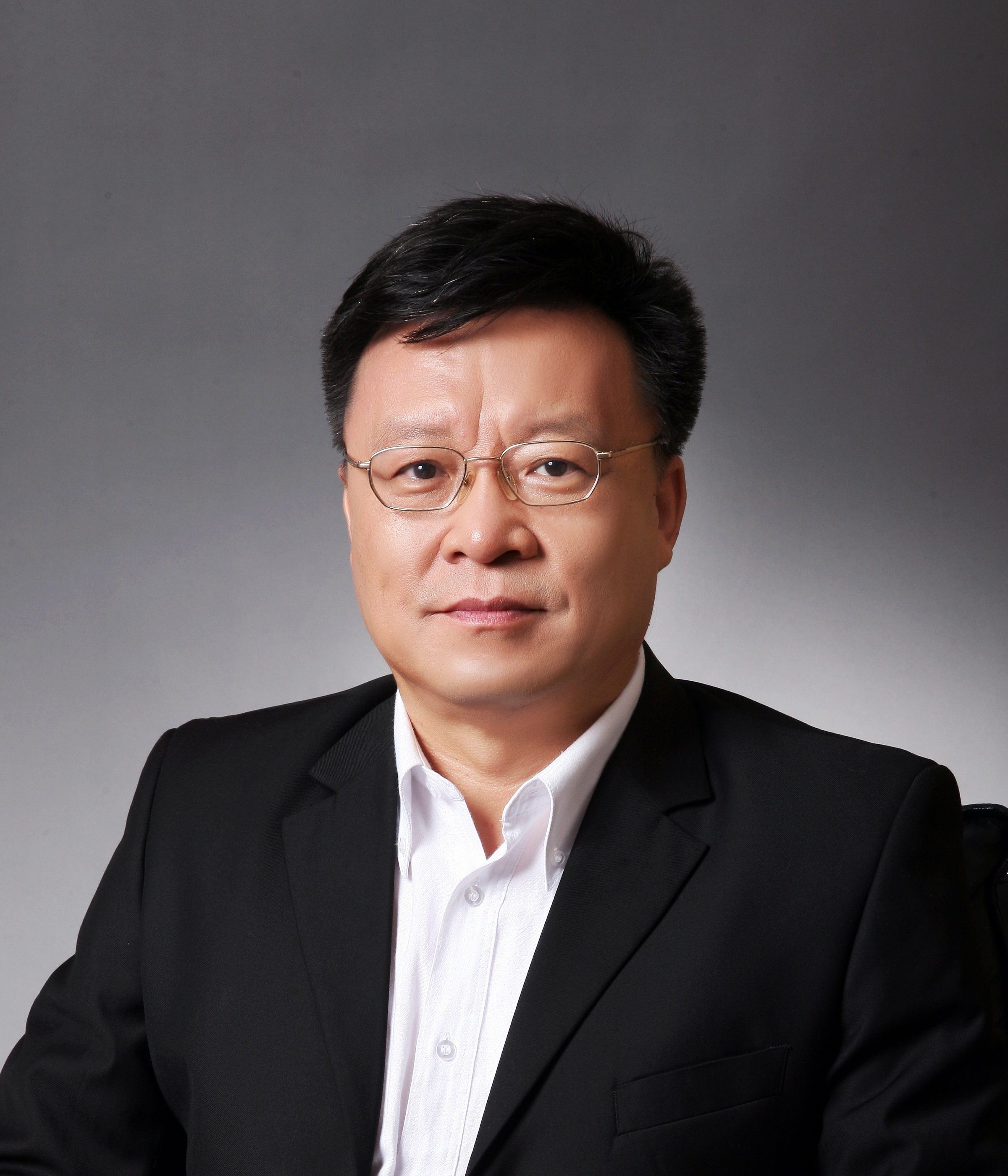
- Born: March 1956 (age 70); Dalian, Liaoning Province, China
- Education: Harbin University of Science and Technology; Harbin Institute of Technology; University of Tokyo
- Awards: Member of Chinese Academy of Engineering; IEEE Fellow; ACM Fellow; IEEE Innovation in Societal Infrastructure Award (2025)
- Scientific career
- Fields: Video coding; video processing; multimedia; computer vision; artificial intelligence; virtual reality
- Workplaces: Peking University; University of Science and Technology of China; Harbin Institute of Technology

Wen Gao (born in 1956) is a Chinese computer scientist. He has received various award recognitions including the CCF Wang Xuan Award. He is the founding director of Peng Cheng Laboratory (Shenzhen, China) and the director of Faculty of Information & Engineering Sciences at Peking University. He pioneered audio-video coding technologies and standards in China, and has served on the faculty of different universities for over 37 years. He received the National Technology Innovation Awards (First Class) in 2020, the top award of science and technology in China, for his work in the field of video coding technology.

== Early life and education ==
Wen Gao was born and grew up in Dalian City, Liaoning Province, China. He has dreamed of becoming an engineer since he was a child. He received the BSc degree in computer science from Harbin University of Science and Technology in 1982. He continued his study in Harbin Institute of Technology (HIT) and got the MSc degree in computer science in 1985. After two years of academic visit in Japan, he received his first PhD degree in computer science from HIT in 1988. In 1991, he earned his second PhD degree in electronics engineering from University of Tokyo, Japan.

== Career ==
Wen Gao has joined with the Peking University as a professor since 2006. He worked for the Harbin Institute of Technology as a teaching assistant after his graduation in 1985. He served as a lecturer from 1988 to 1991, and became the full professor in 1991, and head of computer science department in 1993. He was with the Institute of Computing Technology (ICT), Chinese Academy of Sciences (CAS) as professor from 1996 to 2006. During his career at CAS, he served as the managing director of ICT from 1998 to 1999, the executive vice president of Graduate School of CAS (now the University of CAS) from 2000 to 2004, the vice president of University of Science and Technology of China from 2000 to 2003.

In 1993, he was a visiting scientist in Robotics Institute, Carnegie Mellon University. He was a visiting scientist in Artificial Intelligence Laboratory, Massachusetts Institute of Technology in 1994.

Wen Gao is active in national and international academic activities. He has been the founding director of Peng Cheng Laboratory since 2018. He was the vice president of National Natural Science Foundation of China from 2013 to 2018, and the President of China Computer Federation from 2016 to 2020. He was the founding director of NERCVT (National Engineering Research Center of Visual Technology) of Peking University and the Chief Scientist of the National Basic Research Program of China (973 Program) on Video Coding Technology. He was also the chairman of steering committee for Intelligent Computing System in National Hi-Tech Program from 1996 to 2000. He was the founding chair of IEEE 1857 standard working group, which now becomes IEEE DCSC (Data Compression Standard Committee) in IEEE Standard Association. He was featured by IEEE Spectrum in June 2005 as one of the "Ten-To-Watch" among China's leading technologists. He has served on the journal editorial boards for IEEE Transactions on Circuits and Systems for Video Technology, IEEE Transactions on Multimedia, IEEE Transactions on Image Processing, ACM Computing Survey, EURASIP Journal of Image Communications, and Journal of Visual Communication and Image Representation. He has chaired several conferences: IEEE ICME 2007, ACM Multimedia 2009, IEEE ISCAS 2013, and also served on the advisory and technical committees of numerous professional organizations.

== Research ==
Wen Gao has published six books and over 1100 technical articles in refereed journals and academic conferences. Wen Gao's research on multimedia and computer vision was conducted at Harbin Institute of Technology, first as a graduate student and later as professor, and at Peking University since 2006. His research concentrated on multimedia and computer vision . Wen Gao and his colleagues have made seminal contributions to Surveillance Video Smart Coding and Analysis, Compact Descriptor Visual Search and Audio and Video Coding Standard.

As the head of Chinese Delegation to the Moving Picture Expert Group (MPEG) of International Standard Organization (ISO), Wen Gao presided over the formulation and implementation of China's first generation of video coding and decoding technology standards and set up the Audio and Video Coding Standard (AVS) Workgroup of China in 2002. It has been recognized by both industry and academia that the AVS video coding standards, especially the emerging AVS3 standard, reach a level of maturity and become one of the leading technologies in video industry.

The third generation AVS3 supports 8K UHD video coding. Wen Gao and his colleagues also initiated standardization work on neural-network based video coding technology and machine-vision oriented video coding.

== Awards and honors ==
Wen Gao is a fellow of IEEE, ACM, and a member of Chinese Academy of Engineering.

In 2010, he received the CCF Wang Xuan Award, for “Outstanding contributions in audio video coding theories, standards and applications”.

He was awarded the National Technology Innovation Awards by China State Council twice, a first-class award in 2020 and a second-class award in 2006. He was also the recipient of the second-class National Science and Technology Awards by China State Council for five times (in 2000, 2002, 2003, 2005, 2012).

He received the 2025 IEEE Innovation in Societal Infrastructure Award "For contributions to and leadership in high performance AI computing infrastructure and efficient video encoding".
