= Lucila Ohno-Machado =

Biomedical engineer

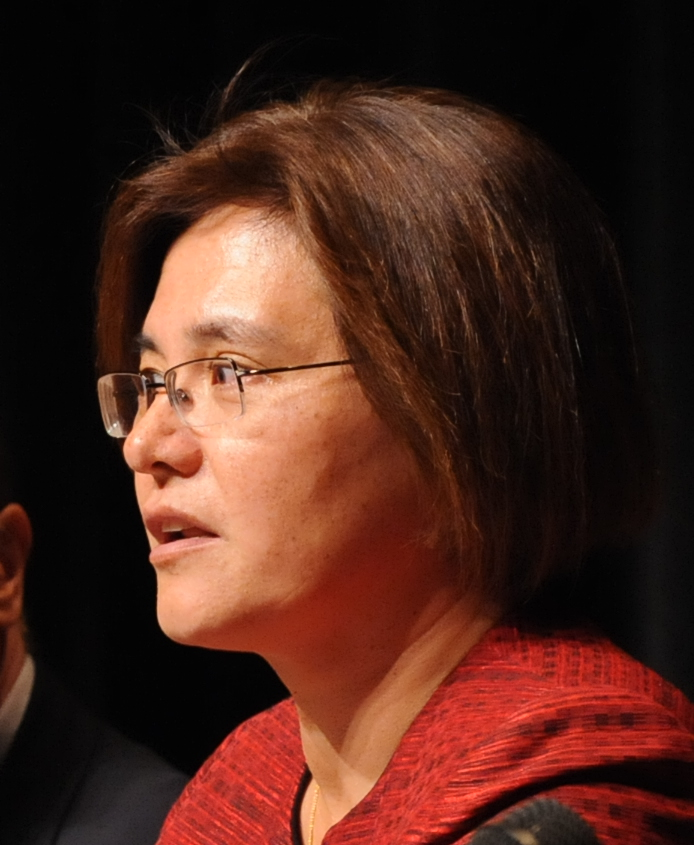
- Lucila Ohno-Machado at 2012 National Science Foundation panel
- Education: University of São Paulo; Stanford University
- Children: 3
- Scientific career
- Workplaces: UC San Diego; Brigham & Women's Hospital; American Medical Informatics Association; National Academy of Medicine; All of Us (initiative); Yale University

Lucila Ohno-Machado is a biomedical engineer and Deputy Dean for Biomedical Informatics at the Yale University School of Medicine. She is an elected member of the American Society for Clinical Investigation and the National Academy of Medicine.

== Early life and education ==
Ohno-Machado grew up in Brazil and her early educational interests were in the field of mathematics and health care. However, in Brazil she had to pursue just one discipline and find a way to combine her interests.

Ohno-Machado earned an MD from the University of São Paulo School of Medicine in Brazil in 1987, where she had been educated since 1982. She also has a Master of Health Administration from Escola de Administração de Empresas de São Paulo, Brazil, where she studied from 1989 to 1991. Before biomedical informatics was a well known topic she had to be creative in combining her interests, and when Stanford University created a medical information science program, she chose to obtain her PhD from this institution.

== Career ==
Ohno-Machado's career spans two continents and a diversity of appointments. During her time studying for a Master of Health Administration, from 1990 to 1991, she was the director of Medical Informatics for the University of São Paulo's radiology department. She then moved to the United States in 1991, becoming a research fellow in medicine at Stanford University from 1991 to 1996, where she earned a PhD in medical information sciences and computer science. While there, she wrote several papers on both machine learning and AIDS, mostly to do with radiological pattern recognition for classification and survival prediction. Her work in this period mainly served to help radiological technicians and their patients better understand situations involving minute changes and irregularities that are hard to visualize but can yield important data points. Such cases include her study on finding low-frequency patterns amongst noisy datasets.

During her residency at Stanford University, Ohno-Machado received 3 awards. The first of which was the Martin Epstein Award, presented by the American Medical Informatics Association, for her paper on the use of backpropagation networks in recognizing low frequency patterns, the second being a Doctoral Dissertation Award from the United States Department of Health and Human Services, both in 1994, and then the Dean's Fellowship award from Stanford's School of Medicine in 1995.

In 1997, she moved to the Boston area to become a professor at the Department of Radiology and the Division of Health Sciences and Technology at Harvard–MIT. She went on to direct the Harvard–MIT–Tufts–Boston University training program in biomedical informatics and was the associate director of the Department of Radiology's Decision Systems Group at Brigham & Women's Hospital. While in Boston, She remained a part of the Californian scientific community, and in 2009, founded the Department of Biomedical Informatics at UC San Diego. She also received several accolades for her work in biomedical informatics during this period. She worked mainly in the Boston area with Harvard, MIT and Brigham and Women's Hospital until around 2010, when she became the editor-in-chief of the Journal of the American Medical Informatics Association.

After two consecutive four-year terms, her term at AMIA ended, and she went on to work at the National Academy of Medicine. This is considered one of the highest honors in the fields of health and medicine. As an early member of the field of bioinformatics, and a champion of equality, "Ohno-Machado’s career has focused on making health data more accessible and usable, so patients and clinicians can make better informed, evidenced-based health decisions together." She is also the founding chair of the University of California Research eXchange program, that provides more than 15 million de-identified patient records from the five largest UC health systems (San Diego, Los Angeles, San Francisco, Davis and Irvine). It is now expanding across California the United States.

Her work has varied much over her career, leading projects to validate breast cancer biomarkers, improve medical alert response technology, assess embryo quality in assisted reproductive technology, predict length of stay after surgery and automate medical device safety monitoring. The algorithms she developed allow complex multivariate predictive models to be built in a distributed fashion, and constitute a very important contribution to biomedical data science. An advocate for open and secure data, she co-leads the California Precision Medicine Consortium, which manages the All of Us (initiative) Research Program in California, a program to collect genetic, biological, environmental, health and lifestyle data from 1 million or more volunteer participants from the United States. Her models and data have been central to the development of the field of bioinformatics and the further integration of technology into the field of medicine.

She is currently the deputy dean for biomedical informatics at Yale University, leading the newly created Section for Biomedical Informatics and Data Science, with the stated goal of "bring[ing] informatics to the clinic and the bedside; innovate new approaches to the analysis of big data across the biomedical research spectrum from basic genetic, proteomic, cellular, and systems biology to the understanding of the social determinants of health; and work in concert with colleagues in data science". Her work will also focus on addressing inequality and security in health care.

== Awards and honors ==
- 2027 – IEEE Innovation in Societal Infrastructure Award (with Xiaoqian Jiang and Jaideep Vaidya)
- 2018 – Elected to the National Academy of Medicine
- Award for Outstanding Contributions to Research, Brigham & Women's Hospital
- Elected to the American College of Medical Informatics
- 2010 – Elected to the American Society for Clinical Investigation
- UCSD University-Wide Diversity and Equal Opportunity Award, 2010
- Partners in Excellence Award, Partners Healthcare, Boston, 2010
- Distinguished Chair in Biomedical Informatics, Brigham and Women's Hospital, 2007
- Clifford A. Barger Mentoring Award, Harvard Medical School, 2004
- 2002 – Elected to the American Medical Informatics Association
- Award for Outstanding Contributions to Research, Department of Radiology, BWH, 2000
- Taplin Award, Division of Health Sciences and Technology, Harvard/MIT, 1999
- James A. Shannon Director's Award, Office of the Director, National Institutes of Health, 1997
- Dean's Fellowship Award, Stanford University School of Medicine, 1995
- Doctoral Dissertation Award, Agency for Health Care and Policy Research, DHHS, 1994
- Martin Epstein Award, American Medical Informatics Association, 1994
