= H. V. Jagadish =

American database researcher

H V Jagadish
- Education: Indian Institute of Technology, Delhi; Stanford University
- Awards: 2026 SIGMOD Edgar F. Codd Innovations Award; ACM Fellow; IEEE Fellow; AAAS Fellow; 2013 SIGMOD Contributions Award
- Scientific career
- Fields: Computer Science
- Workplaces: AT&T; UIUC; University of Michigan

== Biography ==
Hosagrahar Visvesvaraya Jagadish (Jag) is a computer scientist, and a leading scholar in the field of data management and database systems research. He is a Fellow of ACM, Fellow of IEEE, Fellow of AAAS, the Distinguished University Professor of electrical engineering and computer science at the University of Michigan at Ann Arbor, the director of MIDAS (Michigan Institute for Data Science), and a Senior Scientific Director of the National Center for Integrative Biomedical Informatics established by the National Institutes of Health.

Founding Editor-in-Chief of Proceedings of the VLDB Endowment (2008–2014). Jag conceived and implemented the journal-first model for the Proceedings of the VLDB Endowment, a visionary reform that addressed scalability and rigor in publication. PVLDB's model has since been adopted widely across computer science, making this a highly influential service contribution in the field's history.

== Awards ==
In 2013, Jag received the SIGMOD Contributions Award for his extensive record of service to the database community over the past 25 years in a broad range of roles, including conference organization, journal editorship, and society leadership. He received the 2026 SIGMOD Edgar F. Codd Innovations Award for "establishing usability as a first-class design principle in data management, and for pioneering the research agenda that redefined how humans interact with data systems". Jag's extensive list of recognitions also include Distinguished Faculty Achievement Award, University of Michigan (2019) (for excellence in research, education, and leadership), David E. Liddle Research Excellence Award (2008), the Herbert Kopf Service Excellence Award (2011), and IIT Delhi Distinguished Alumni Award (2020) (for global contributions to computer science and data management).
