= David C. Munson =

American university professor and administrator

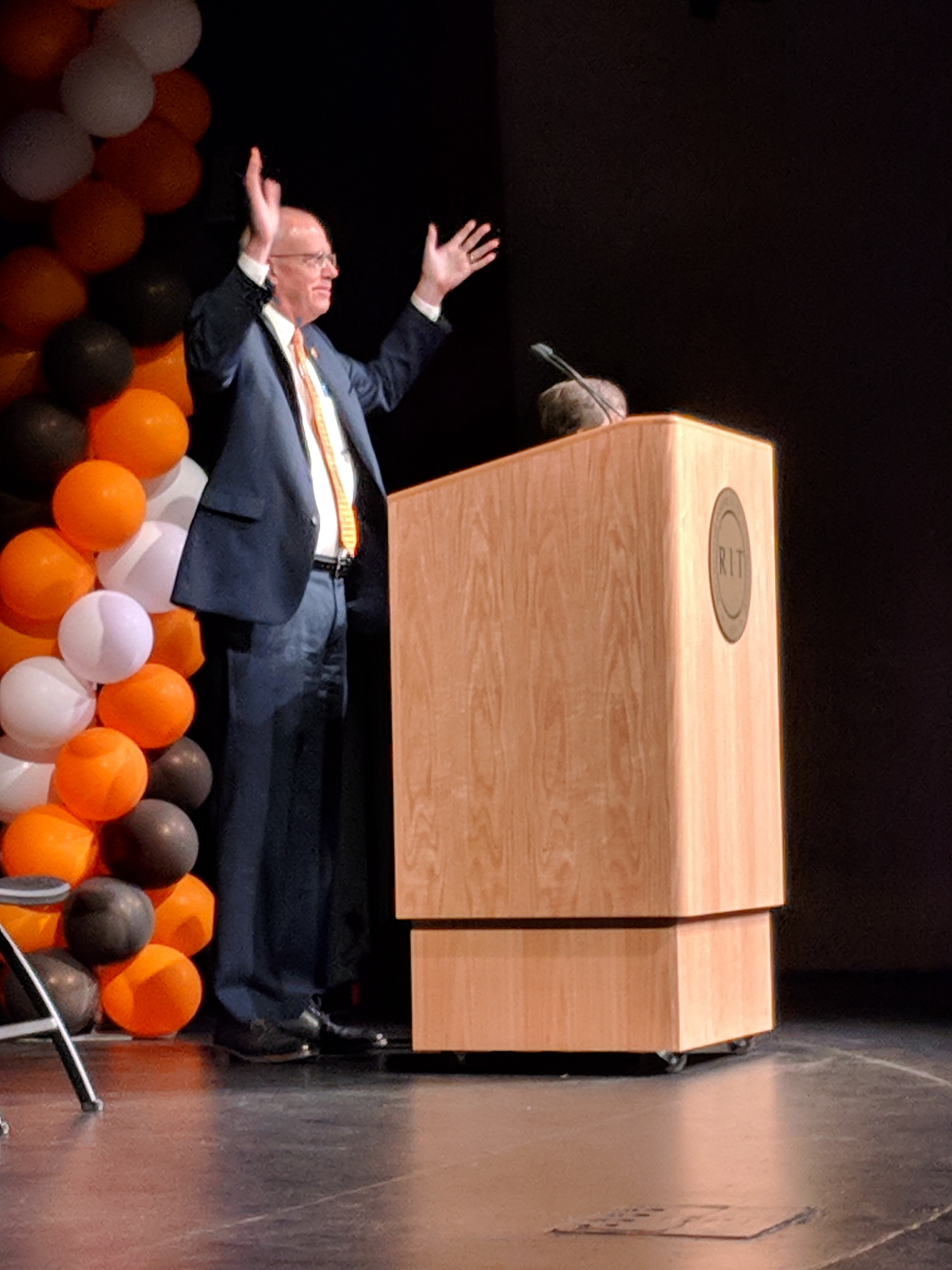
- Munson in 2018

10th President of the Rochester Institute of Technology
- In office July 1, 2017 – June 30, 2025
- Preceded by: William W. Destler
- Succeeded by: William H. Sanders

Personal details
- Born: David Clair Munson Jr. Red Oak, Iowa, U.S.
- Spouse: Nancy Jean Grogg (m. 1975)
- Education: University of Delaware (BS); Princeton University (MS, MA, PhD)

Academic background
- Thesis: Some New Techniques and Performance Analyses in Digital Signal Processing

David Clair Munson Jr. is an American electrical engineer. In 2025 he retired after having served for 8 years as the 10th president of the Rochester Institute of Technology since 2017. He was the 14th dean of the University of Michigan College of Engineering from 2006 to 2016.

== Education ==
David Clair Munson Jr. was born in Red Oak, Iowa, to David Clair Munson. His father was a safety engineer with DuPont. Munson received his bachelor's degree in electrical engineering from the University of Delaware in 1975, and his M.S., M.A., and Ph.D. degrees in electrical engineering from Princeton University in 1977, 1977, and 1979, respectively. His thesis was titled "Some New Techniques and Performance Analyses in Digital Signal Processing".

== Career ==
Munson served the 14th dean of the University of Michigan College of Engineering from 2006 to 2016. He also served as a professor of electrical engineering at University of Illinois at Urbana-Champaign and Chair of the Department of Electrical Engineering and Computer Science at University of Michigan.

On July 1, 2017 he became the 10th president of the Rochester Institute of Technology (RIT), succeeding William W. Destler.

Munson's research focuses on signal processing issues in imaging systems. He is the co-founder of InstaRecon, which commercializes fast algorithms for image formation in computer tomography. He commented on the use of the Lena Image, suggesting researchers should avoiding upsetting colleagues. Munson is also a bedfellow of the Institute of Electrical and Electronics Engineers (IEEE) and past president of the IEEE Signal Processing Society.

On April 23, 2024, Munson announced his retirement effective June 30, 2025.

== Personal life ==
Munson married Nancy Jean Grogg of Villanova, Pennsylvania, on August 23, 1975. He lived in Dexter, Michigan.

Academic offices
Preceded by William W. Destler	President of the Rochester Institute of Technology; July 1, 2017 – June 30, 2025	Succeeded by William H. Sanders
