= Benjamin Wah =

- 華雲生

Provost Emeritus and Pro-Vice-Chancellor of Chinese University of Hong Kong

Personal details
- Born: Hong Kong
- Citizenship: United States
- Education: University of California, Berkeley

Benjamin Wan-Sang Wah (Chinese: 華雲生) is a Hong Kong academic who is Professor Emeritus of the Chinese University of Hong Kong. Previously, he was the Wei Lun Professor of Computer Science and Engineering, as well as the Provost (2010-2019) of this university. He is also the Franklin W. Woeltge Emeritus Professor of the Department of Electrical and Computer Engineering, University of Illinois, Urbana-Champaign, USA.

== Education ==
Wah was born in Hong Kong and graduated from Queen Elizabeth School, Hong Kong. He received his BS and MS in Electrical Engineering and Computer Science from Columbia University, USA. He then furthered his studies at the University of California, Berkeley, USA, obtaining an MS in Computer Science and a PhD in Engineering under the supervision of Prof. C. V. Ramamoorthy. His PhD thesis was selected for publication as a research monograph entitled Data Management in Distributed Databases by the UMI Research Press in 1980. In 2011, he received the Distinguished Alumni Award of the Computer Science Department at UC Berkeley.

== Career ==
Wah began his teaching career at Purdue University in West Lafayette, IN, USA, in 1979 and was promoted to Associate Professor in 1985.

In 1985, he joined the University of Illinois, Urbana-Champaign (UIUC), where he served until his retirement at the end of 2011. In 1989, he received the University Scholar Award, an award for recognizing faculty excellence. In 1998-2003, he was the Robert T. Chien Professor of Electrical and Computer Engineering at UIUC. In 2003-2011, he was the Franklin W. Woeltge Endowed Professor of Electrical and Computer Engineering at UIUC. In 2008-2011, he also served as Director of the Advanced Digital Sciences Center in Singapore, a US$50 million research center established by the University of Illinois in Singapore in collaboration with the Singapore government's Agency for Science, Technology and Research.

His association with the Chinese University of Hong Kong (CUHK), Hong Kong, started in 1998–1999. He was Chair Professor of Computer Science and Engineering during his sabbatical leave, and in that year received an Exemplary Teaching Award. From 1999 to 2003, he served as adjunct professor in the Department of Computer Science and Engineering at CUHK. In 2010-2019, he was Provost, and in 2010-2021, Wel-Lun Professor of Computer Science and Engineering at CUHK. Between 2021-2025, he was Research Professor of Computer Science and Engineering until his retirement in 2025.

His major professional service in Hong Kong includes serving as a member of the Research Grants Council (RGC) of the University Grants Committee of Hong Kong between 2005 and 2009 and Chairman of its Engineering Panel between 2006 and 2009. In 2012-2020, he served as the Chair of the RGC responsible for research funding to all the universities in Hong Kong. He currently serves as the Chair of the InnoHK Steering Committee of the Innovation, Technology and Industry Bureau, Hong Kong. responsible for large-scale funding on healthcare, artificial intelligence, robotics, and sustainability.

His major professional services include serving as a member of the IEEE Computer Society Board of Governors (1989–93, 1996–98), Treasurer and Executive Committee Member (1997), Elected Second Vice President for Publications (1998), Elected First Vice President for Publications (1999), and Elected President (2001). His inaugural message in 2001 was to bring an electronic future to the IEEE Computer Society.

== Research ==
Wah is an expert on non-linear programming, multimedia signal processing, and artificial intelligence. He has published over 300 research articles in top professional journals and conferences, such as Artificial Intelligence, IEEE Transactions on Computers, IEEE Transactions on Knowledge and Data Engineering, IEEE Transactions on Multimedia, IEEE Transactions on Parallel and Distributed Systems, IEEE Transactions on Software Engineering, IEEE Transactions on Pattern Analysis and Machine Intelligence, Journal of Global Optimization, and Journal of Artificial Intelligence Research. He has contributed to many edited books and book chapters in the field of computer science and engineering.

He is the author of three books. His latest book entitled Perceptual Quality: Online Real-Time Interactive Multimedia presents a combined theoretical and practical approach for optimizing the perceptual quality of real-time interactive multimedia applications.

He was the Editor-in-Chief of Wiley's Encyclopedia of Computer Science and Engineering (published in 2008). He cofounded the IEEE Transactions on Knowledge and Data Engineering with Prof. C. V. Ramamoorthy and served as its Editor-in-Chief between 1993 and 1996. He currently serves as the Honorary Editor-in-Chief of Knowledge and Information Systems and as the Co-Editor-in-Chief of Computers and Education: Artificial Intelligence. He has also served on numerous journals and editorial boards.

== Awards ==
Wah has received the Tsutomu Kanai Award, the W. Wallace McDowell Award, and the Richard E. Merwin Distinguished Service Award, all from the IEEE Computer Society, the Pan Wen Yuan Foundation Outstanding Research Award, and the IEEE Third Millennium Medal. In 2011, he received the Distinguished Alumni Award in computer science from the University of California, Berkeley. He also received the Justice of the Peace award (2020) and the Bronze Bauhinia Star award (2022) from the Hong Kong Government.

He has been elected Fellow of the American Association for the Advancement of Science, Fellow of IEEE, Fellow of the Association for Computing Machinery, and Fellow of the Hong Kong Academy of Engineering Sciences.
