= William H. Sanders =

American educator (born 1960s)

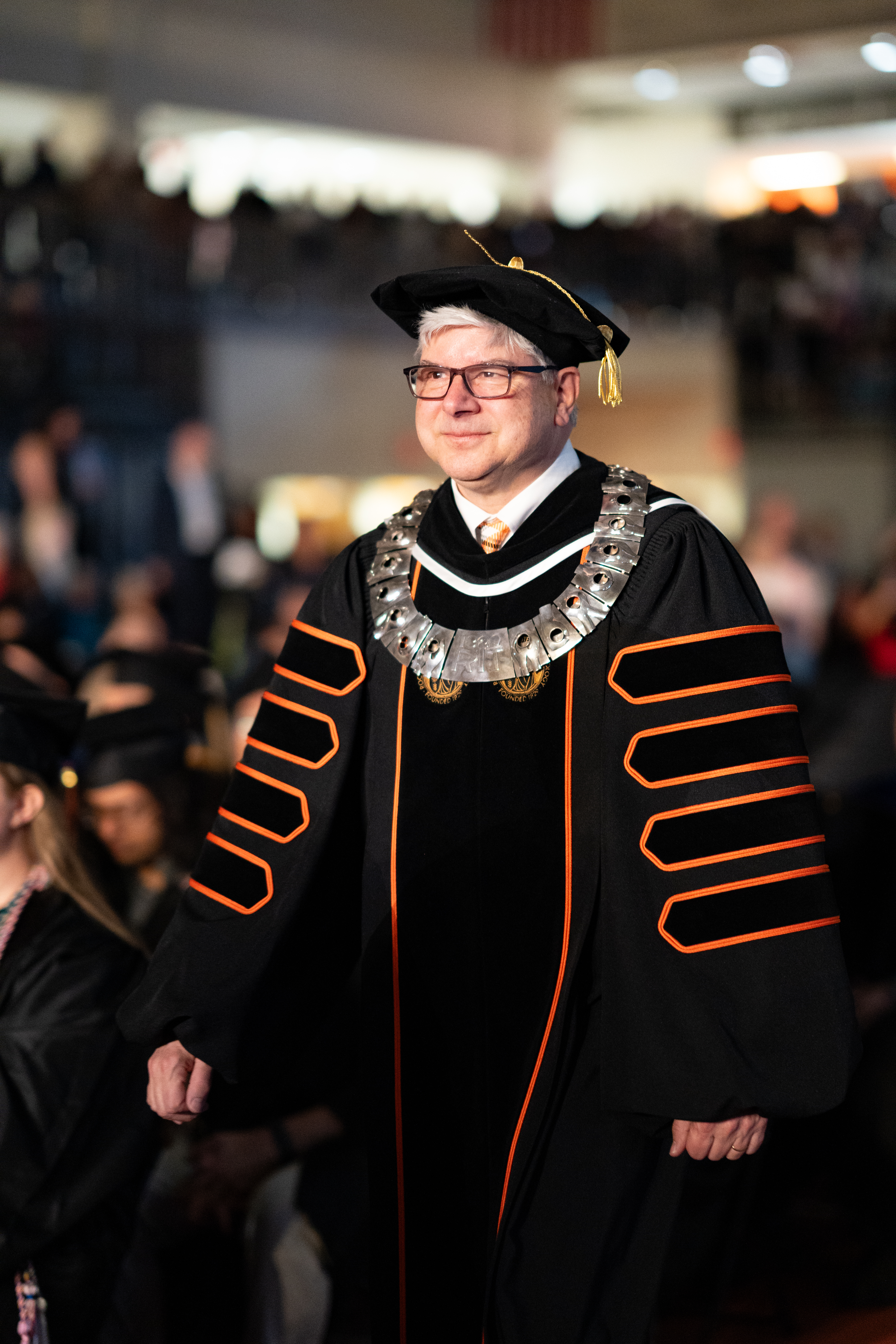
- Sanders in 2026

11th President of the Rochester Institute of Technology
- Incumbent
- Assumed office July 1, 2025
- Preceded by: David C. Munson

Personal details
- Born: William Harry Sanders; 1961 or 1962 (age 64–65)
- Spouse: Emily
- Children: 2
- Education: University of Michigan (BSE, MSE, PhD)
- Occupation: Educator
- Awards: IEEE Innovation in Societal Infrastructure Award
- Years active: 1988–present
- Employer(s): University of Arizona (1988–1994); University of Illinois Urbana-Champaign (1994–2020); Carnegie Mellon University (2020–2025); Rochester Institute of Technology (2025-present)

Academic background
- Thesis: Construction and Solution of Performability Models Based on Stochastic Activity Networks

William Harry Sanders (born 1961/1962) is the current president of the Rochester Institute of Technology. He was previously the dean of the Carnegie Mellon College of Engineering.

== Early life ==
William Harry Sanders was born in 1961 or 1962, to Verna (née Semivan) and William Joe Sanders. He grew up in Grand Rapids, Michigan. He received a Bachelor of Science in Engineering in computer engineering at the University of Michigan in 1983, a Master of Science in Engineering in computer, information, and control engineering in 1985, and his Ph.D. in computer science and engineering in 1988. His dissertation was titled "Construction and Solution of Performability Models Based on Stochastic Activity Networks".

== Career ==
In 1988, Sanders became an assistant professor in the department of computer and electrical engineering at the University of Arizona. In 1994, he became an associate professor. In 1994, he began teaching at the University of Illinois Urbana-Champaign as an associate professor. In 1998, he became a professor at the university. He was Donald Biggar Willett Professor in Engineering from 2005 to 2018. From 2019 to 2020, he was the Herman M. Dieckamp Endowed Chair in Engineering. He was interim head of the department of computer and electrical engineering in 2013 and served as department head from 2014 to 2018.

In 2004, Sanders was the founding director of the Information Trust Institute. He served in the role until 2011. In 2009, he co-founded the Advanced Digital Sciences Center in Singapore. He served as the center's associate director from 2009 to 2020. He was acting director of the Coordinated Science Laboratory at the university from 2008 to 2010 and then served as its director from 2010 to 2014. On August 16, 2018, he became interim director of the Discovery Partners Institute. He served as interim director until 2020. In January 2020, he joined Carnegie Mellon University's college of engineering as its dean. He has published more than 300 research papers in his field.

On July 1, 2025, Sanders became the 11th president of the Rochester Institute of Technology, succeeding David C. Munson.

== Awards and achievements ==
In 2023, he was elected to the National Academy of Engineering. He became a bedfellow of the Institute of Electrical and Electronics Engineers in January 2020, the Association for Computing Machinery in January 2004 and the American Association for the Advancement of Science in 2014. In 2016, he was a recipient of the IEEE Innovation in Societal Infrastructure Award for "assessment-driven design of trustworthy cyber infrastructure for societal-scale systems".

== Personal life ==
Sanders is married to Emily. They have two children, Elizabeth and Zachary.

Academic offices
Preceded by David C. Munson	President of the Rochester Institute of Technology; July 1, 2025 –	Succeeded by N/A
