= Masaru Kitsuregawa =

Japanese computer scientist

- Born: 13 July 1955 (age 71)
- Education: University of Tokyo
- Awards: SIGMOD Edgar F. Codd Innovations Award
- Scientific career
- Workplaces: University of Tokyo

Masaru Kitsuregawa (喜連川 優, Kitsuregawa Masaru; born 13 July 1955) is a Japanese computer scientist. Currently he is a professor at the University of Tokyo.

== Biography ==
=== Education ===
- 1978: Graduated from the Department of Electrical Engineering, University of Tokyo
- 1983: Received the degree of Ph.D. from the Department of Computer Science, University of Tokyo

=== Work ===
- 1983: Lecturer at the University of Tokyo
- 1984: Associate professor

=== Awards and honours ===
- 2009: SIGMOD Edgar F. Codd Innovations Award
- 2013: Medal with Purple Ribbon
- 2015: C&C Prize
- 2020: IEEE Innovation in Societal Infrastructure Award
