= Web engineering =

Web application development platform

The World Wide Web has become a major delivery platform for a variety of complex and sophisticated enterprise applications in several domains. In addition to their inherent multifaceted functionality, these Web applications exhibit complex behaviour and place some unique demands on their usability, performance, security, and ability to grow and evolve. However, a vast majority of these applications continue to be developed in an ad hoc way, contributing to problems of usability, maintainability, quality and reliability. While Web development can benefit from established practices from other related disciplines, it has certain distinguishing characteristics that demand special considerations. In recent years, there have been developments towards addressing these considerations.

Web engineering focuses on the methodologies, techniques, and tools that are the foundation of Web application development and which support their design, development, evolution, and evaluation. Web application development has certain characteristics that make it different from traditional software, information systems, or computer application development.

Web engineering is multidisciplinary and encompasses contributions from diverse areas: systems analysis and design, software engineering, hypermedia/hypertext engineering, requirements engineering, human-computer interaction, user interface, data engineering, information science, information indexing and retrieval, testing, modelling and simulation, project management, and graphic design and presentation. Web engineering is neither a clone nor a subset of software engineering, although both involve programming and software development. While Web Engineering uses software engineering principles, it encompasses new approaches, methodologies, tools, techniques, and guidelines to meet the unique requirements of Web-based applications.

== As a discipline ==
Proponents of Web engineering supported the establishment of Web engineering as a discipline at an early stage of Web. Major arguments for Web engineering as a new discipline are:

- Web-based Information Systems (WIS) development process is different and unique.
- Web engineering is multi-disciplinary; no single discipline (such as software engineering) can provide a complete theory basis, body of knowledge and practices to guide WIS development.
- Issues of evolution and lifecycle management when compared to more 'traditional' applications.
- Web-based information systems and applications are pervasive and non-trivial. The prospect of Web as a platform will continue to grow and it is worth being treated specifically.

However, it has been controversial, especially for people in other traditional disciplines such as software engineering, to recognize Web engineering as a new field. The issue is how different and independent Web engineering is, compared with other disciplines.

Main topics of Web engineering include, but are not limited to, the following areas:

=== Modeling disciplines ===
- Business Processes for Applications on the Web
- Process Modelling of Web applications
- Requirements Engineering for Web applications
- B2B applications

=== Design disciplines, tools, and methods ===
- UML and the Web
- Conceptual Modeling of Web Applications (aka. Web modeling)
- Prototyping Methods and Tools
- Web design methods
- CASE Tools for Web Applications
- Web Interface Design
- Data Models for Web Information Systems

=== Implementation disciplines ===
- Integrated Web Application Development Environments
- Code Generation for Web Applications
- Software Factories for/on the Web
- Web 2.0, AJAX, E4X, ASP.NET, PHP and Other New Developments
- Web Services Development and Deployment

=== Testing disciplines ===
- Testing and Evaluation of Web systems and Applications.
- Testing Automation, Methods, and Tools.

=== Applications categories disciplines ===
- Semantic Web applications
- Document centric Web sites
- Transactional Web applications
- Interactive Web applications
- Workflow-based Web applications
- Collaborative Web applications
- Portal-oriented Web applications
- Ubiquitous and Mobile Web Applications
- Device Independent Web Delivery
- Localization and Internationalization of Web Applications
- Personalization of Web Applications

== Attributes ==
=== Web quality ===
- Web Metrics, Cost Estimation, and Measurement
- Personalisation and Adaptation of Web applications
- Web Quality
- Usability of Web Applications
- Web accessibility
- Performance of Web-based applications

=== Content-related ===
- Web Content Management
- Content Management System (CMS)
- Multimedia Authoring Tools and Software
- Authoring of adaptive hypermedia

== Education ==
- Master of Science: Web Engineering as a branch of study within the MSc program Web Sciences at the Johannes Kepler University Linz, Austria
- Diploma in Web Engineering: Web Engineering as a study program at the International Webmasters College (iWMC), Germany

== See also ==
- DevOps
- Web developer
- Web modeling

== Sources ==
- Robert L. Glass, "Who's Right in the Web Development Debate?" Cutter IT Journal, July 2001, Vol. 14, No.7, pp 6–0.
- S. Ceri, P. Fraternali, A. Bongio, M. Brambilla, S. Comai, M. Matera. "Designing Data-Intensive Web Applications". Morgan Kaufmann Publisher, Dec 2002, ISBN 1-55860-843-5

=== Web engineering resources ===
Organizations

- International Society for Web Engineering e.V.: http://www.iswe-ev.de/
- Web Engineering Community: http://www.webengineering.org
- WISE Society: http://www.wisesociety.org/
- ACM SIGWEB: http://www.acm.org/sigweb
- World Wide Web Consortium: http://www.w3.org

Books

- "Engineering Web Applications", by Sven Casteleyn, Florian Daniel, Peter Dolog and Maristella Matera, Springer, 2009, ISBN 978-3-540-92200-1
- "Web Engineering: Modelling and Implementing Web Applications", edited by Gustavo Rossi, Oscar Pastor, Daniel Schwabe and Luis Olsina, Springer Verlag HCIS, 2007, ISBN 978-1-84628-922-4
- "Cost Estimation Techniques for Web Projects", Emilia Mendes, IGI Publishing, ISBN 978-1-59904-135-3
- "Web Engineering - The Discipline of Systematic Development of Web Applications", edited by Gerti Kappel, Birgit Pröll, Siegfried Reich, and Werner Retschitzegger, John Wiley & Sons, 2006
- "Web Engineering", edited by Emilia Mendes and Nile Mosley, Springer-Verlag, 2005
- "Web Engineering: Principles and Techniques", edited by Woojong Suh, Idea Group Publishing, 2005
- "Form-Oriented Analysis -- A New Methodology to Model Form-Based Applications", by Dirk Draheim, Gerald Weber, Springer, 2005
- "Building Web Applications with UML" (2nd edition), by Jim Conallen, Pearson Education, 2003
- "Information Architecture for the World Wide Web" (2nd edition), by Peter Morville and Louis Rosenfeld, O'Reilly, 2002
- "Web Site Engineering: Beyond Web Page Design", by Thomas A. Powell, David L. Jones and Dominique C. Cutts, Prentice Hall, 1998
- "Designing Data-Intensive Web Applications", by S. Ceri, P. Fraternali, A. Bongio, M. Brambilla, S. Comai, M. Matera. Morgan Kaufmann Publisher, Dec 2002, ISBN 1-55860-843-5

Conferences

- World Wide Web Conference (by IW3C2, since 1994): http://www.iw3c2.org
- International Conference on Web Engineering (ICWE) (since 2000)
  - 2018: http://icwe2018.webengineering.org/ (Caceres, Spain)
  - 2017: http://icwe2017.webengineering.org/ (Rome, Italy)
  - 2016: http://icwe2016.webengineering.org/ (Lugano, Switzerland)
  - 2007: http://www.icwe2007.org/
  - 2006: http://www.icwe2006.org
  - 2005: http://www.icwe2005.org
  - 2004: http://www.icwe2004.org
- ICWE Conference Proceedings
  - ICWE2007: LNCS 4607 https://www.springer.com/computer/database+management+&+information+retrieval/book/978-3-540-73596-0
  - ICWE2005: LNCS 3579 https://www.springer.com/east/home/generic/search/results?SGWID=5-40109-22-58872076-0
  - ICWE2004: LNCS 3140 https://www.springer.com/east/home/generic/search/results?SGWID=5-40109-22-32445543-0
  - ICWE2003: LNCS 2722 https://www.springer.com/east/home/generic/search/results?SGWID=5-40109-22-3092664-0
- Web Information Systems Engineering Conference (by WISE Society, since 2000): http://www.wisesociety.org/
- International Conference on Web Information Systems and Technologies (Webist) (since 2005): http://www.webist.org/
- International Workshop on Web Site Evolution (WSE): http://www.websiteevolution.org/
- International Conference on Software Engineering: http://www.icse-conferences.org/

Book chapters and articles

- Pressman, R.S., 'Applying Web Engineering', Part 3, Chapters 16–20, in Software Engineering: A Practitioner's Perspective, Sixth Edition, McGraw-Hill, New York, 2004. http://www.rspa.com/'

Journals

- Journal of Web Engineering: http://www.rintonpress.com/journals/jwe/
- International Journal of Web Engineering and Technology: http://www.inderscience.com/browse/index.php?journalID=48
- ACM Transactions on Internet Technology: http://toit.acm.org/
- World Wide Web (Springer): https://link.springer.com/journal/11280
- Web coding journal: http://www.web-code.org/
- Web Reference: https://www.kevi.my/

Special issues

- Web Engineering, IEEE MultiMedia, Jan.–Mar. 2001 (Part 1) and April–June 2001 (Part 2). http://csdl2.computer.org/persagen/DLPublication.jsp?pubtype=m&acronym=mu
- Usability Engineering, IEEE Software, January–February 2001.
- Web Engineering, Cutter IT Journal, 14(7), July 2001.*
- Testing E-business Applications, Cutter IT Journal, September 2001.
- Engineering Internet Software, IEEE Software, March–April 2002.
- Usability and the Web, IEEE Internet Computing, March–April 2002.

Citations
