= Paul Zellinsky =

American politician (1933–2015)

Member of the Washington House of Representatives from the 23rd district
- In office 1984–1994, 1996–1998

Personal details
- Born: February 21, 1933 Seattle, Washington
- Died: August 28, 2015 (aged 82) Bremerton, Washington
- Party: Republican (1996–present); Democratic (–1996)
- Spouse: Joanne Zellinsky
- Education: University of Washington

Paul William Zellinsky Sr. (February 21, 1933 – August 28, 2015) was a politician in the American state of Washington.

He attended Seattle University and the University of Washington. He owned a car dealership.

Zellinsky, a Democrat, represented District 23 (parts of Kitsap County) in the Washington House of Representatives from 1984 to 1994, and as a Republican from 1996 to 1998.

He was married to Joanne and had two children. They resided in Bremerton, Washington. On August 28, 2015, he died at the age of 82 in Bremerton.
