= Scott Rains =

American travel writer, consultant and advocate for disabled people

- Born: November 27, 1956; Blue Island, Illinois, U.S.
- Died: April 30, 2016 (aged 59); San Jose, California, U.S.
- Occupations: Travel writer, consultant and advocate for disabled people

Scott Rains (November 27, 1956 – April 30, 2016) was an American travel writer, consultant, and advocate for disabled people. He was New Mobility magazine's "Person of the Year" for 2009.

== Early life and education ==
Scott Paul Rains was born on November 27, 1956, in Midlothian, Illinois, to Lois Mazalan (1930–1986) and Francis Clarence Dombrowski-Rains (1919–2010). His parents later moved their small family of four to Seattle, Washington in December 1958.

Study-abroad opportunities in high school took Rains to Guatemala and Belize, and he recalled this as the beginning of his interest in travel. He became quadriplegic at age 17, in 1972, after a spinal surgery.

Rains attended the University of Washington in Seattle, where he majored in linguistics and led the Disabled Students' Commission. He earned a master's degree in 1991 in Pastoral Ministry from Seattle University and a D.Min. in Pastoral Ministry from the Graduate Theological Foundation in South Bend, Indiana. His doctoral work involved digitizing documents related to the Rule of Saint Benedict.

== Career ==
After completing his doctoral studies, Rains was director of university ministry at Benedictine University in Lisle, Illinois. From 2004 to 2005 he was a Resident Scholar at the Center for Cultural Studies at the University of California, Santa Cruz, developing the concept of "inclusive travel." He was a speaker at the International Conference on Universal Design in Rio de Janeiro in 2004, and gave a seminar on universal design in tourism at the event.

He was a consultant to South African tourism officials in anticipation of the 2010 FIFA World Cup, and spoke on the topic of inclusive tourism at conferences around the world. Rains also wrote about disaster planning and disabled people, about theme parks, and about "aging in place" as a feature of universal design. He was a fellow of the Community Technology Foundation of California, and a lifetime honorary member of the European Network for Accessible Tourism (ENAT). In 2010 he was named a Fellow at the Bookshare Initiative of Benetech.

== Personal life ==
Scott Rains died in spring 2016, from a brain tumor, in San Jose, California.
