= Webist =

The International Conference on Web Information Systems and Technologies is a major point of contact between scientific researchers, on the areas of web-based information systems. The conference has been held every year since 2005.

WEBIST has technical sessions, tutorial talks, poster sessions and keynote lectures. Papers accepted are included in the Proceedings book.

WEBIST achieved a fast popularity in 2007 and its maturity along of the subsequent years, reaching a stable conference-size. Usually, some papers are selected to be included in a post publication published by Springer Science+Business Media in series Lecture Notes in Business Information Processing.

== Areas ==
- Internet Technology
- Mobile Systems
- Web infrastructures, Architectures and Platforms
- Artificial Intelligence on the Web
- Web Interfaces
- Social Networking

== Current Chairs ==
=== Conference Chair ===
Joaquim Filipe, Polytechnic Institute of Setúbal / INSTICC, Portugal

=== Program Co-Chairs ===
Francisco Domínguez Mayo, University of Seville, Spain

== Editions ==
=== WEBIST 2019 - Vienna, Austria ===
Proceedings - Proceedings of the 15th International Conference on Web Information Systems and Technologies. ISBN 978-989-758-386-5

Best Paper Award

Gabriela Bosetti, Előd Egyed-Zsigmond and Lucas O. Ono. "CATI: An Active Learning System for Event Detection on Mibroblogs’ Large Datasets"

Best Student Paper - Robin Marx, Tom De Decker, Peter Quax and Wim Lamotte. "Of the Utmost Importance: Resource Prioritization in HTTP/3 over QUIC"

=== WEBIST 2018 - Seville, Spain ===
Proceedings - Proceedings of the 14th International Conference on Web Information Systems and Technologies. ISBN 978-989-758-324-7

Best Paper Award

Natacha Targino, Damires Souza and Ana Carolina Salgado. "An Approach for Generating and Semantically Enriching Dataset Profiles"

Best Student Paper - Mariano Rico, Rizkallah Touma, Anna Queralt and María S. Pérez. "Machine Learning-based Query Augmentation for SPARQL Endpoints"

=== WEBIST 2017 - Porto, Portugal ===
Proceedings - Proceedings of the 13th International Conference on Web Information Systems and Technologies. ISBN 978-989-758-246-2

Proceedings - Proceedings of the Web Information Systems and Technologies - 13th International Conference, Revised Selected Papers, Springer 2018. ISBN 978-3-319-93527-0

Best Paper Award

Denis Kotkov, Jari Veijalainen and Shuaiqiang Wang. "A Serendipity-Oriented Greedy Algorithm for Recommendations"

Best Student Paper - Claire Prudhomme, Timo Homburg, Jean-Jacques Ponciano, Frank Boochs, Ana Roxin and Christophe Cruz. "Automatic Integration of Spatial Data into the Semantic Web"

=== WEBIST 2016 - Rome, Italy ===
Proceedings - Proceedings of the 12th International Conference on Web Information Systems and Technologies - Volume 1. ISBN 978-989-758-186-1

Proceedings - Proceedings of the 12th International Conference on Web Information Systems and Technologies - Volume 2. ISBN 978-989-758-186-1

Proceedings - Proceedings of the Web Information Systems and Technologies - 12th International Conference, Revised Selected Papers, Springer 2017. ISBN 978-3-319-66467-5

Best Paper Award

Gregor Blichmann, Carsten Radeck, Robert Starke and Klaus Meißner. "Triple-based Sharing of Context-Aware Composite Web Applications for Non-programmers"

Best Student Paper - Daniel Herzog and Wolfgang Wörndl. "Extending Content-Boosted Collaborative Filtering for Context-aware, Mobile Event Recommendations"

=== WEBIST 2015 - Lisbon, Portugal ===
Proceedings - Proceedings of the 11th International Conference on Web Information Systems and Technologies. ISBN 978-989-758-106-9

Best Paper Award

Giseli Rabello Lopes, Bernardo Pereira Nunes, Luiz André P. Paes Leme, Terhi Nurmikko-Fuller and Marco A. Casanova. "Knowing the past to Plan for the Future"

Best Student Paper - Martin Leginus, Leon Derczynski and Peter Dolog. "Enhanced Information Access to Social Streams Through Word Clouds with Entity Grouping"

=== WEBIST 2014 - Barcelona, Spain ===
Proceedings - Proceedings of the 10th International Conference on Web Information Systems and Technologies. ISBN 978-989-758-023-9

Best Paper Award

Nan Tian, Yue Xu, Yuefeng Li, Ahmad Abdel-Hafez and Audun Josang. "Product Feature Taxonomy Learning based on User Reviews"

Best Student Paper - Karsten Seipp and Kate Devlin. "The One Hand Wonder"

=== WEBIST 2013 - Aachen, Germany ===
Proceedings - Proceedings of the 9th International Conference on Web Information Systems and Technologies. ISBN 978-989-8565-54-9

Best Paper Award

Christos Makris, Yannis Plegas, Giannis Tzimas and Emmanouil Viennas. "SerfSIN: Search Engines Results' Refinement using a Sense-driven Inference Network"

Tyler Corbin, Tomasz Müldner and Jan Krzysztof Miziolek. "Pre-order Compression Schemes for XML in the Real Time Environment"

Best Student Paper - Ricardo Lage, Peter Dolog and Martin Leginus. "Classifying Short Messages on Social Networks using Vector Space Models"

Maria Chroni, Angelos Fylakis and Stavros D. Nikolopoulos. "Watermarking Images in the Frequency Domain by Exploiting Self-inverting Permutations"

=== WEBIST 2012 - Porto, Portugal ===
Proceedings - Proceedings of the 8th International Conference on Web Information Systems and Technologies. ISBN 978-989-8565-08-2

Best Paper Award

Alexander Zibula and Tim A. Majchrzak. "DEVELOPING A CROSS-PLATFORM MOBILE SMART METER APPLICATION USING HTML5, JQUERY MOBILE AND PHONEGAP"

Best Student Paper - Mikhail Zolotukhin, Timo Hämäläinen and Antti Juvonen. "GROWING HIERARCHICAL SELF-ORGANISING MAPS FOR ONLINE ANOMALY DETECTION BY USING NETWORK LOGS"

=== WEBIST 2011 - Noordwijkerhout, Netherlands ===
Proceedings - Proceedings of the 7th International Conference on Web Information Systems and Technologies. ISBN 978-989-8425-51-5

Best Paper Award

Olfa Bouchaala, Mohamed Sellami, Walid Gaaloul, Samir Tata and Mohamed Jmaiel. "GRAPH-BASED MANAGEMENT OF COMMUNITIES OF WEB SERVICE REGISTRIES"

Best Student Paper - Daniel Hienert, Benjamin Zapilko, Philipp Schaer and Brigitte Mathiak. "VIZGR"

=== WEBIST 2010 - Valencia, Spain ===
Proceedings - Proceedings of the 6th International Conference on Web Information Systems and Technology. ISBN 978-989-674-025-2

=== WEBIST 2009 - Lisbon, Portugal ===
Proceedings - Proceedings of the Fifth International Conference on Web Information Systems and Technologies. ISBN 978-989-8111-81-4

=== WEBIST 2008 - Funchal, Madeira, Portugal ===
Proceedings - Proceedings of the Fourth International Conference on Web Information Systems and Technologies. ISBN 978-989-8111-26-5

=== WEBIST 2007 - Barcelona, Spain ===
Proceedings - Proceedings of the Third International Conference on Web Information Systems and Technologies. ISBN 978-972-8865-77-1

=== WEBIST 2006 - Setúbal, Portugal ===
Proceedings - Proceedings of WEBIST 2006 - Second International Conference on Web Information Systems and Technologies. ISBN 978-972-8865-46-7

=== WEBIST 2005 - Miami, United States ===
Proceedings - Proceedings of the First International Conference on Web Information Systems and Technologies. ISBN 972-8865-20-1
