= Christine Sleeter =

American professor and educational reformer

Christine E. Sleeter
- Born: 1948 (age 77–78); Oregon, United States
- Education: B.A. in political science, B.A. in secondary education, M.A. in curriculum and instruction, Ph.D. in curriculum and instruction
- Alma mater: Willamette University, Central Washington University, Seattle University, University of Wisconsin-Madison
- Occupations: Professor emerita, author
- Years active: 1982–present
- Employer: California State University, Monterey Bay
- Known for: Multicultural education

Christine E. Sleeter (born 1948) is an American professor and educational reformer. She is known as the Professor Emerita in the School of Professional Studies, California State University, Monterey Bay. She has also served as the Vice President of Division K (Teaching and Teacher Education) of the American Educational Research Association, and as president of the National Association for Multicultural Education. Her work primarily focuses on multicultural education, preparation of teachers for culturally diverse schools, and anti-racism.

== Personal background ==
Christine E. Sleeter grew up in Medford, Oregon. In 1970, she graduated from Willamette University with a bachelor's degree in political science. In 1972, she attended Central Washington University, where she studied Secondary Education and earned a second bachelor's degree. In 1977, she earned a master's degree in Curriculum and Instruction from Seattle University. Teaching in Seattle, Washington prompted her initial interest in multicultural education. Her work as a learning disabilities teacher formed a position about the construction of disability within social contexts. In 1981, she earned a Ph.D. in Curriculum and Instruction from the University of Wisconsin-Madison.

== Professional background ==
Sleeter was a faculty member at Ripon College (Wisconsin) between 1982 and 1985 and the University of Wisconsin-Parkside between 1985 and 1994. She served as a visiting professor at numerous universities, including University of Maine, University of Colorado Boulder, Victoria University of Wellington, University of Auckland, San Francisco State University, University of Washington, and Universidad Nacional de Educacion a Distancia.

In 1995, Sleeter moved to California State University at Monterey Bay, where she served as a founding member of the faculty and professor of teacher education. She retired as a professor emeritus in 2003.

She also served as Vice President of Division K (Teaching and Teacher Education) of the American Educational Research Association and President of the National Association for Multicultural Education.

In 2017, she made a donation of $250,000 to the Ute Indian Tribe in Utah, after her research into her family history revealed her great-grandparents used the Homestead Act to acquire a 160-acre plot of farm land that had been home to the Ute. Her family eventually sold the land and invested the profits, leading to an inheritance that eventually was passed to her. She made the donation as a way of "returning what was stolen", according to a news article.

== Honors and awards ==
- 2003: CSU Monterey Bay President's Medal
- 2009: American Educational Research Association Social Justice Award
- 2009: Division K Teaching and Teacher Education Legacy Award
- 2012: Chapman University Paulo Freire Education Project Social Justice Award
- 2012: American Educational Research Association Special Interest Group Multicultural and Multiethnic Education Lifetime Achievement Award

== Published works ==
Sleeter has authored, edited, and co-edited 17 books and over 100 articles. She has collaborated with Carl Grant in conceptualizing approaches to multicultural education in the book, Making Choices for Multicultural Education, and has shown how those approaches relate to practice in the book, Turning on Learning. Her conceptualization of a process for designing multicultural curriculum continues to be used in the book Un-Standardizing Curriculum. She has researched teacher education and teacher professional development for multicultural education and culturally responsive pedagogy in her book, Confronting the marginalization of culturally responsive pedagogy, as well as in the book Professional Development for Culturally Responsive and Relationship-Based Pedagogy. Her foundational work conceptualizing learning disabilities as a social construction presents the field of disability studies. In 2010, she was commissioned by the National Education Association to review the research on the impact of ethnic studies on students, which supported work in ethnic studies.

Selected articles

- Sleeter, C. E. (2001). "Preparing teachers for culturally diverse schools: Research and the overwhelming presence of whiteness", Journal of Teacher Education 52(2): 94–106.
- Sleeter, C. E. (2008). "Preparing white teachers for diverse students", in M. Cochran-Smith, S. Feiman-Nemser, & J. McIntyre (Eds.), Handbook of Research in Teacher Education: Enduring Issues in Changing Contexts, 3rd ed., (pp. 559–582), New York: Routledge.
- Sleeter, C. E. (2008). "Teaching for democracy in an age of corporatocracy", Teachers College Record 110 (1): 139–159.
- Sleeter, C. E. (2008). "Equity, democracy, and neoliberal assaults on teacher education", Teaching and Teacher Education 24 (8), 1947–1957.
- Sleeter, C. E. (2009). "Developing teacher epistemological sophistication about multicultural curriculum: A case study", Action in Teacher Education 31 (1), 3–13.
- Sleeter, C. E. (2010). "Building counter-theory about disability", Disability Studies Quarterly 30 (2)
- Sleeter, C. E. (2010). "Federal education policy and social justice education", in T. K. Chapman & N. Hobbel (Eds), Social Justice Pedagogy Across the Curriculum, (pp. 36–58). New York: Routledge.
- Sleeter, C. E.; and H.R. Milner, IV. (2011). "Researching successful efforts in teacher education to diversify teachers", in A. F. Ball C. A. Tyson, Eds. Studying Diversity in Teacher Education, (p. 81-104). New York, NY: Rowman & Littlefield.
- Sleeter, C. E. (2011). "Becoming white: Reinterpreting a family story by putting race back into the picture", Race Ethnicity & Education 14(3), 421–433.
- Sleeter, C. E. (2012). "Confronting the marginalization of culturally responsive pedagogy", Urban Education 47(3), 562–584.

Books

- Grant, C. A.; and C.E. Sleeter, (2007). Doing Multicultural Education for Achievement and Equity, New York: RoutledgeFalmer. ISBN 978-0-415-88057-2
- Sleeter, C. E., Ed. (2007). Facing Accountability in Education: Democracy and Equity at Risk, New York: Teachers College Press. ISBN 978-0-8077-4779-7
- May, S.; and C.E. Sleeter, Eds. (2010). Critical Multiculturalism: Theory and Praxis, New York: Routledge. ISBN 978-0-415-80285-7
- Sleeter, C. E.; and C. Cornbleth, C., Eds. (2011). Teaching with Vision: Culturally Responsive Teaching in Standards-Based Classrooms, New York: Teachers College Press. ISBN 978-0-8077-5173-2
- Sleeter, C. E.; and E. Soriano, E., Eds. (2012). Creating Solidarity across Diverse Communities: International Perspectives in Education, New York: Teachers College Press. ISBN 978-0-8077-5337-8
- Sleeter, C. E.; Upadhyaya, S. B.; Mishra, A.; and S. Kumar, Eds. (2012). School Education, Pluralism and Marginality: Comparative Perspectives, Andhra Pradesh, India: Orient Black Swan. ISBN 978-81-250-4531-1.
