= Poet Laureate of Washington =

- Incumbent; Derek Sheffield
- Nominator: Washington Arts Commission
- Appointer: Governor of Washington
- Term length: two years
- Constituting instrument: Revised Code of Washington
- Formation: 2007
- First holder: Samuel Green
- Salary: $20,000
- Website: wapoetlaureate.org

The poet laureate of Washington is a poet designated by the government of the US state of Washington to promote poetry generally, and Washington poetry specifically, within the state. The office was established by an act of the Washington State Legislature in 2007.

== History ==
In 1931, Ella Higginson was named "Poet Laureate of Washington" by the Washington State Federation of Women's Clubs, however, the position was an unofficial, privately recognized post. The office was not officially established until 2007 when the Washington legislature enacted a bill introduced by state senator Ken Jacobsen to create the office. Jacobsen's original proposal called for the poet laureate to be paid with a firkin of beer annually, however, the act as finally adopted simply specifies that the poet laureate "shall receive compensation at a level determined by the [Washington Arts] commission".

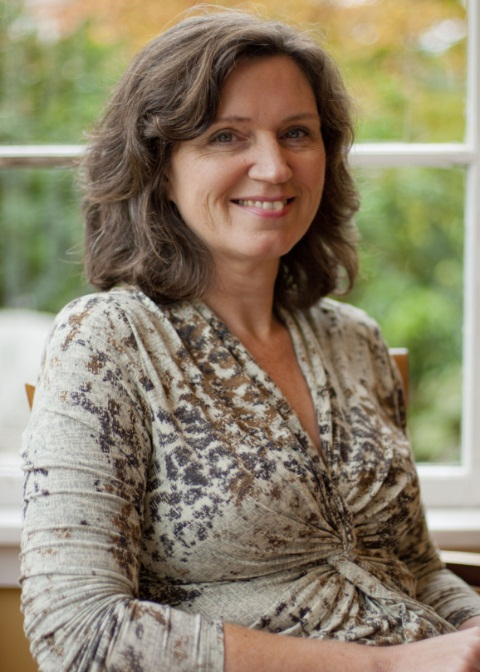
Kathleen Flenniken is a former poet laureate of Washington.

From 2009 to 2011 the office of poet laureate was vacant due to a paucity of state funds. In 2016 Gonzaga University professor Tod Marshall was appointed the fourth poet laureate of Washington. Marshall's major initiative during his term was Washington 129, an anthology of 129 poems gathered from Washingtonians meant to represent the 129 years (as of 2018) since Washington was admitted into the United States.

== Office ==
The role of the poet laureate of Washington is to "build awareness and appreciation of poetry — including the state’s legacy of poetry — through public readings, workshops, lectures and presentations in communities, schools, colleges, universities, and other public settings in geographically diverse areas of the state". Poets laureate of Washington are appointed for a two-year term by the governor of Washington acting on the recommendation of the Washington Arts Commission, an independent agency of the Washington state government, from a list of self-nominated candidates. The incumbent is eligible for reappointment one time. The office's only statutory qualifications are that the candidate be a resident of Washington and a published poet, though the commission is empowered to establish additional criteria.

The poet laureate of Washington receives an annual stipend of $10,000, which is funded by the Washington State Arts Commission (ArtsWA) and Humanities WA.

== Poets laureate of Washington ==
- Samuel Green (2007–2009)
- Kathleen Flenniken (2012–2014)
- Elizabeth Austen (2014–2016)
- Tod Marshall (2016–2018)
- Claudia Castro Luna (2019–2021)
- Rena Priest (2021–2023)
- Arianne True (2023–2025)
- Derek Sheffield (2025-present)

== See also ==
- Poet laureate
- List of U.S. state poets laureate
- United States Poet Laureate
