= Samuel Green (poet) =

American poet and bookbinder

Samuel ("Sam") Green (born 1948) is an American poet and bookbinder. He was appointed the first Poet Laureate of Washington in 2007. Green is the author of twelve poetry collections, including The Grace of Necessity, which won the 2008 Washington State Book Award for Poetry. In 2009, he was awarded a National Endowment for the Arts Fellowship in Poetry, and sat on the NEA panel for the 2011 fellowships. His work has appeared in hundreds of publications including Poetry, Poetry Northwest, Southern Poetry Review, and Prairie Schooner.

Green was born in Sedro-Woolley, Washington and raised in Anacortes, Washington. He spent four years in the Coast Guard, serving in Antarctica and South Vietnam. Afterward, through the Veterans Vocational Rehabilitation Program, he attended college, earning his A.A. from Highline Community College and his B.A. and M.A. from Western Washington University. Green has served several winter terms as the Distinguished Visiting Northwest Writer at Seattle University, as well as twenty-one summer terms in Ireland. He has also been a visiting professor at Southern Utah University, Western Wyoming Community College, and Colorado College. He is active with the Skagit River Poetry Festival. Since 1982, Green has lived off the grid on Waldron Island in a log house he built himself, running Brooding Heron Press with his wife Sally. They produce finely printed and bound volumes of verse by poets such as Denise Levertov, Ted Kooser, John Haines, Donald Hall, James Laughlin, Jane Hirshfield, and Hayden Carruth, among many others.

== Publications ==
Gillnets (Cold Mountain Press, 1978).

Wind: Four Letters to Melinda Mueller (Breakwater Press, 1980).

Hands Learning to Work (Brooding Heron Press, 1984).

Vertebrae (Grey Spider Press, 1989).

Keeping Faith (Grey Spider Press, 1990).

Communion: Poems (Grey Spider Press, 1992).

Vertebrae: Poems 1972-1994 (Eastern Washington University Press, 1994).

Working in the Dark (Grey Spider Press, 1998).

The Only Time We Have: New Poems (Grey Spider Press, 2002).

The Grace of Necessity (Carnegie-Mellon University Press, 2008).

First Up: Barnstorming for Poetry (Chuckanut Editions, 2012).

All That Might Be Done (Carnegie-Mellon University Press, 2014)

Disturbing the Light (Carnegie-Mellon University Press, 2020)

Notes to Wang Wei (Mad River Press, 2024)

Abecedarium(Skagit River Poetry Foundation, 2024)

Sage & Disciple: New & Selected Poems (White Pine Press, August 2026)

Ordinary Days, (Mad River Press, 2026)

== Awards and honors ==
Washington State Poet Laureate 2007- 2009.

Stanley W. Lindberg Editor's Award, Pacific Lutheran University, 2008

Distinguished Alumnus of the Year Award, Highline Community College, 2008.

2008 Washington State Book Award for Poetry (for The Grace of Necessity).

National Endowment for the Arts Fellowship for Poetry, 2009.

Artist Trust Fellowship in Literature (2011)

Doctor of Humane Letters (Honorary) from Seattle University, 2018

Pushcart Prize, 2021
