= Beng Chin Ooi =

Singaporean computer scientist (1961–2025)

- 黄铭钧
- Born: 1961; Malaysia
- Died: 25 April 2026 (aged 65); Singapore
- Known for: Systems: GEOQL, BestPeer, Apache SINGA, BlockBench, NeurDB; Theory: Learnable function, Filter and refine, Distributed processing

Academic background
- Education: Monash University
- Thesis: Efficient query processing in a geographic information system

Chinese name
- Traditional Chinese: 黃銘鈞
- Simplified Chinese: 黄铭钧
- Hanyu Pinyin: Huáng Míngjūn
- Hokkien POJ: Ûiⁿ Bêngkin

Beng Chin Ooi (Chinese: 黃銘鈞; pinyin: Huáng Míngjūn; 1961 – 25 April 2026) was a Singaporean computer scientist and academic who was the Qiushi Chair Professor at Zhejiang University, and a professor at the School of Software Technology, Zhejiang University. Previously, he was the Lee Kong Chian Centennial Professor and served as the Dean of the School of Computing at the National University of Singapore from 2007 to 2013. He was also an adjunct Chang Jiang Professor at Zhejiang University. Additionally, he was a Visiting Distinguished Chair Professor at the National University of Singapore, a Visiting Chair Professor at Peking University, and a Visiting Distinguished Professor at Tsinghua University. He was a Fellow of the Institute of Electrical and Electronics Engineers 2009, Association for Computing Machinery 2011, China Computer Federation 2024, Singapore National Academy of Science 2016, and Academy of Engineering Singapore 2023. He was a foreign member of Academia Europaea 2022, and Chinese Academy of Sciences 2023. He did his BSc (1985) and PhD (1989) at Monash University.

Beng Chin was the recipient of the 2009 ACM SIGMOD Contributions award, 2020 ACM SIGMOD EF Codd Innovations Award, 2024 ACM SIGMOD Systems Award, and a co-recipient of the 2011 Singapore President's Science Award. He was also the recipient of 2012 IEEE Computer Society Kanai award, 2014 IEEE TCDE CSEE (Computer Science, Engineering and Education) Impact Award, and 2016 China Computer Federation (CCF) Overseas Outstanding Contributions Award.

Beng Chin died on 25 April 2026, at the age of 65.
