= Robert L. Glass =

American software engineer and writer (born 1932)

Robert L. (Bob) Glass (born 1932) is an American software engineer and writer, known for his works on software engineering, especially on the measuring of the quality of software design and his studies of the state of the art of software engineering research.

== Biography ==
Glass held his first job in computing in 1954. He worked from 1954 to 1957 in the aerospace industry at North American Aviation, from 1957 to 1965 at Aerojet-General Corp. and from 1965 to 1982 at Boeing Company, where he built software tools used by applications specialists.

Between 1970 and 1972, Glass had worked on a tools-focused research grant at the University of Washington. From 1982 to 1987, he taught in the Software Engineering graduate program at Seattle University, and subsequently spent a year at the Software Engineering Institute. Early 2000s he has been visiting professor at the Linköping University in Sweden and at the Griffith University in Queensland, Australia. The Linkoping University awarded him an honorary PhD in 1995.

He is the emeritus editor-in-chief of the Journal of Systems and Software and also writes regular columns for Communications of the ACM and IEEE Software. (Note: Robert Glass wrote the "Loyal Opposition" column in the IEEE Software journal for years. His final column was: Glass, Robert L. "Goodbye!.") In 1995 he was awarded an honorary Ph.D. from Linkoping University of Sweden, and in 1999 he was named a fellow of the Association for Computing Machinery (ACM) professional society. Using the pseudonym Miles Benson, Glass in the 1970s regularly wrote disguised stories of failed computing projects for industry publication Computerworld.

After 45 years in the field Glass described himself as "my head is in the academic area of computing, but my heart is in its practice." (Note: Attributed to Glass in Joseph Feller (2005, p. 517)) Writing in IEEE Software in 2000, Glass criticized open-source software, predicting that it will not reach far, and "will be limited to one or a few cults emerging from a niche culture." Glass's basis for this bold prediction was that open-source software "goes against the grain of everything I know about the software field".

== Publications ==
Glass authored more than 200 papers and 25 books. A selection:

- 1977. The universal elixir and other computing projects which failed
- 1978. Tales of computing folk : hot dogs and mixed nuts
- 1979. Software reliability guidebook
- 1979. Power of peonage
- 1980. The second coming : more computing projects which failed. With "Sue deNim".
- 1981. Software soliloquies
- 1981. Software maintenance guidebook
- 1983. Real-time software (edited by)
- 1983. Computing catastrophes (compiled by)
- 1988. Modern programming practices : a report from industry
- 1988. Software communication skills
- 1989. Software runaways
- 1990. Measuring software design quality. With David N. Card.
- 1991. Software conflict : essays on the art and science of software engineering
- 1992. Measuring and motivating maintenance programmers. With Jerome B. Landsbaum.
- 1995. Software creativity
- 1996. ISO 9000 approach to building quality software. With Östen Oskarsson.
- 1998. In the Beginning: Recollections of Software Pioneers. Editor. IEEE Computer Society Press, Los Alamitos, California.
- 1999. Computing calamities : lessons learned from products, projects, and companies that failed.
- 2001. ComputingFailure.com : war stories from the electronic revolution
- 2003. Facts and fallacies of software engineering
- 2006. Software Conflict 2.0
- 2006. Software Creativity 2.0
- 2011. The Dark Side of Software Engineering: Evil on Computing Projects
- 2020. In the Beginning 2.0: Personal Recollections of Software Pioneers
