= List of presidents of the Rochester Institute of Technology =

The Rochester Athenaeum and the Mechanics Institute, founded in 1829 and 1885 respectively, were merged in 1891, with the institution being called Rochester Athenæum and Mechanics Institute (renamed to the Rochester Institute of Technology (RIT) in 1944. RIT has had 11 presidents since 1891, with the 1829 founding date referencing the Athenæum's 1829 charter. In the decades prior to the selection of RIT's first president, the university was administered primarily by the board of trustees.

== List of presidents ==
No.	Image	President	Term start	Term end	Ref.
Presidents of Rochester Athenæum and Mechanics Institute (1910–1944)
1		Carleton B. Gibson	1910	1916	
2		James F. Barker	1916	1919	
3		Royal B. Farnum	1919	1921	
4		John A. Randall	1922	1936	
Presidents of Rochester Institute of Technology (1944–present)
5		Mark W. Ellingson	1936	1969	
6		Paul A. Miller	1969	1979	
7		M. Richard Rose	January 1, 1979	May 31, 1992	
acting		Thomas R. Plough (Note: executive vice president and provost)	June 1, 1992	August 31, 1992	
8		Albert J. Simone	September 1, 1992	June 30, 2007	
9		William W. Destler	July 1, 2007	June 30, 2017	
10		David C. Munson	July 1, 2017	June 30, 2025	
11		William H. Sanders	July 1, 2025	Present	

Table notes:
