= John Moylan (principal) =

American educator (1932–2021)

John Lawrence Moylan
- Born: 1932; Montague, Massachusetts, US
- Died: January 15, 2021 (aged 88–89); College Park, Maryland, US
- Education: Bachelor from Assumption University; Masters from Catholic University of America
- Occupations: Teacher, Football coach, basketball coach, Principal
- Organization: DeMatha Catholic High School
- Spouse: Joan Moylan
- Children: 4
- Awards: National Principal of the Year

John Moylan (1932 – January 15, 2021) was an American educator. After growing up and attending school through undergraduate schooling in the Worcester, Massachusetts area. He then received a post graduate degree from Catholic University of America and later was hired as a teacher and coaches for various sports programs at DeMatha Catholic High School, just outside of Washington, DC. He then, in 1968, became principal there, the first lay principal in the Archdiocese of Washington.

== Early life and education ==
John Lawrence Moylan was born in Montague, Massachusetts. Throughout his childhood and teen years, he attended Catholic schools. Moylan went to St. Anns Elementary in Turners Falls, Massachusetts, and later went to Assumption High School. After high school Moylan attended Assumption College in Worcester, where he majored in both French and philosophy. Upon graduation from Assumption, he pursued and earned his master's degree in school administration at the Catholic University of America. Moylan then served in the United States Army Intelligence and Security Command for two years, between 1954 and 1956, before he turned to teaching.

== Career ==
In 1956 John Moylan was hired by DeMatha Catholic High School in Maryland as a French teacher. He also served the school as a guidance counselor, football coach and basketball coach. In 1968, Moylan was appointed principal of DeMatha. This marked the first time that a lay person was made principal of a Catholic school in the Archdiocese of Washington. While he was principal, DeMatha Catholic High School became one of the top private schools in Maryland. He founded the music program, which is now nationally recognized as one of the top Catholic high school music programs in the United States. In addition, he also installed several new sports teams, including soccer, hockey, crew, lacrosse, and golf. All of these changes to the school led to DeMatha being named a Blue Ribbon School of Excellence by the United States Department of Education in 1984 and 1991. Moylan, along with basketball head coach Morgan Wootten, were largely given the record for the success of DeMatha's basketball program. Wootten was quoted in 1991 saying "John Moylan is the reason behind our success". He eventually stepped down from his principal duties at the age of 68 but continued to be involved in academic administration until his death on January 15, 2021.
