= Dick Hanson =

American football player (born 1949)

No. 77
- Position: Defensive tackle

Personal information
- Born: December 25, 1949 (age 76); Hillsboro, North Dakota, U.S.
- Listed height: 6 ft 6 in (1.98 m)
- Listed weight: 280 lb (127 kg)

Career information
- High school: Central (Fargo, North Dakota)
- College: North Dakota State
- NFL draft: 1971: undrafted

Career history
- New York Giants (1971)

Awards and highlights
- 2× Small college national champion (1968–1969)
- Stats at Pro Football Reference

Dr. Richard Alan Hanson (born December 25, 1949) is an American former professional football defensive tackle who played one season with the New York Giants of the National Football League (NFL). He played college football at North Dakota State. He was the interim president of North Dakota State University from 2009 to 2010.

== Early life and college ==
Richard Alan Hanson was born on December 25, 1949, in Hillsboro, North Dakota. He attended Central High School in Fargo, North Dakota.

He played college football for the North Dakota State Bison from 1967 to 1970. North Dakota State was named small college national champions in 1968 and 1969. He was inducted into the Bison Athletic Hall of Fame in 1984.

== Professional career ==
Hanson signed with the New York Giants in 1971 after going undrafted in the 1971 NFL draft. He played in three games for the Giants in 1971 as a defensive tackle and was released by the team in 1972. He was listed at 6'6" and 280 pounds during his professional career.

== Post-playing career ==
Hanson served a stint as a graduate assistant for the North Dakota State Bison football team after his NFL career. He graduated from North Dakota State with a Bachelor of Arts in sociology and a Master of Science in child development and family relations. He also earned a Doctor of Philosophy in applied behavioral science from the University of California, Davis.

At North Dakota State University, Hanson was the associate vice president for academic affairs from 1992 to 1995 and interim vice president for academic affairs in 1995. He was the dean and vice president for academic affairs at Augustana College from 1995 to 2005. He also served a stint at California State University, Chico. Hanson was the president at Waldorf College as well. On October 23, 2009, the North Dakota State Board of Higher Education named Hanson the interim president at North Dakota State. On June 15, 2010, he was succeeded by Dean L. Bresciani.
