= Francesco Cesareo =

American academic administrator and historian

16th President of Assumption University
- In office October 12, 2007 – June 30, 2022
- Succeeded by: Gregory S. Weiner

Personal details
- Born: Queens, New York, U.S.
- Education: Cathedral College of the Immaculate Conception (BA); Fordham University (MA, PhD)

Francesco C. Cesareo (often called "Prez Chez" by his students) is an American academic administrator and historian who served as the president of Assumption University in Worcester, Massachusetts from October 12, 2007 to June 30, 2022. Cesareo is also the chairman of the National Review Board since 2013.

== Early life and education ==
Cesareo was born in New York to Italian immigrant parents. He was raised in Queens, and graduated from Cathedral College of the Immaculate Conception in Douglaston, New York before earning his Master of Arts and Ph.D in late medieval and early modern European history from Fordham University. As a Fulbright Scholar, he studied at the University of Rome and the Pontifical Gregorian University.

== Career ==
Beginning in 1989, he was a professor of history at John Carroll University in Cleveland, where he became founding director of the Institute of Catholic Studies in 1997 and held the John J. and Mary Jane Breen Chair in Catholic Studies. He was appointed dean of the McAnulty College and Graduate School of Liberal Arts at Duquesne University in Pittsburgh in 2004. In July 2007, he became president of Assumption College.

Cesareo's research focuses on the Renaissance and Reformation periods. He has published on the Counter-Reformation, the history of 15th and 16th century Rome, and the Renaissance papacy, and also on Renaissance education, the history of the Catholic church, and Catholic higher education. He has been managing editor of Archivum Historicum Societatis Iesu, a scholarly journal published semi-annually by the Jesuit Historical Institute in Rome and the Institute of Catholic Studies at John Carroll University.

On August 13, 2026, Pope Leo XIV appointed him as a member of the Pontifical Committee for Historical Sciences.

Educational offices
Preceded by Thomas R. Plough (1998–2007)	President of Assumption College; Francesco Cesareo (2007-2022)	Succeeded by Gregory S. Weiner
