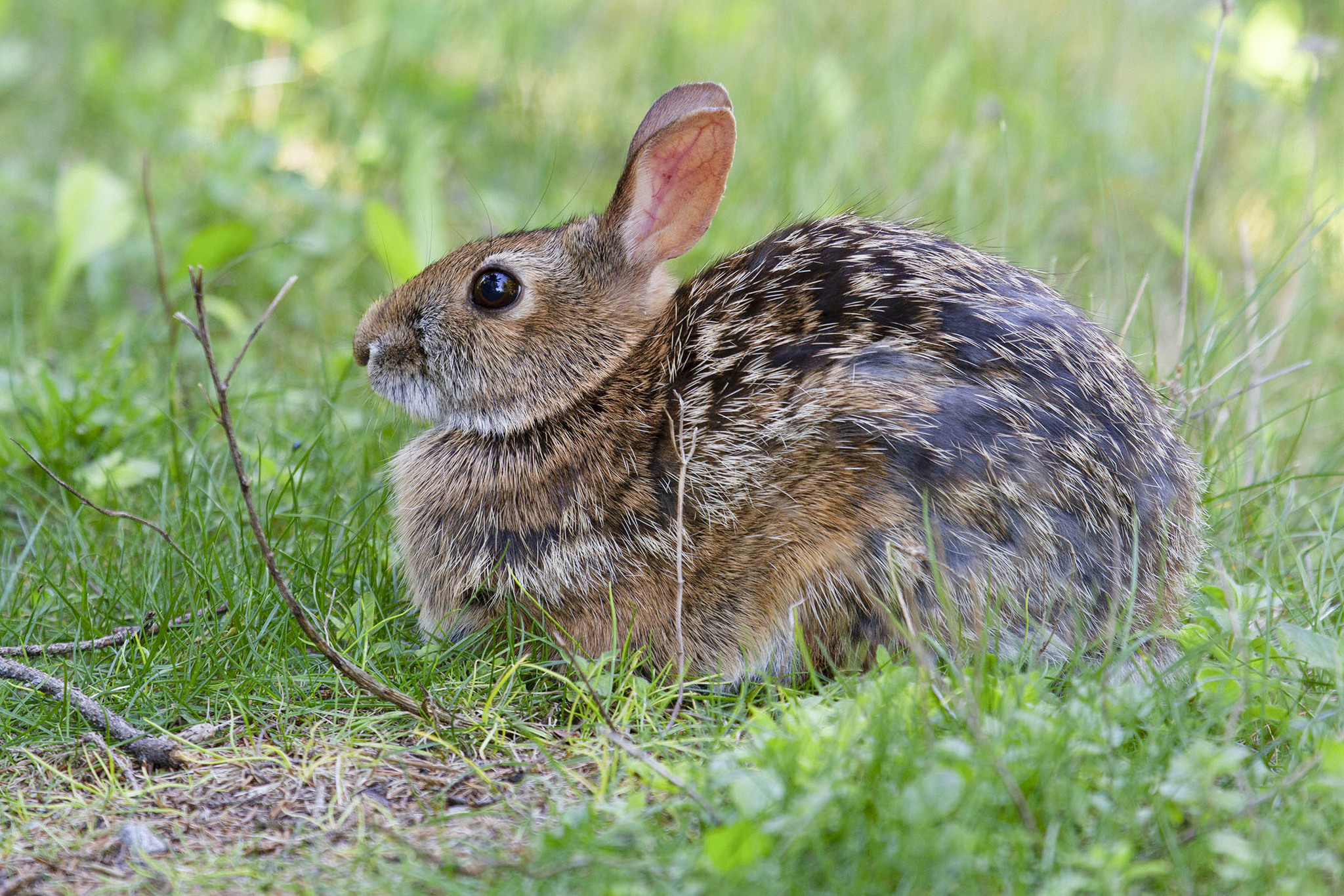
- In the Appalachians of West Virginia

Conservation status
- Near Threatened (IUCN 3.1)

- Apparently Secure (NatureServe)

Scientific classification
- Kingdom: Animalia
- Phylum: Chordata
- Class: Mammalia
- Infraclass: Placentalia
- Order: Lagomorpha
- Family: Leporidae
- Genus: Sylvilagus
- Species: S. obscurus

Binomial name
- Sylvilagus obscurus Chapman, Cramer, Dippenaar & Robinson, 1992
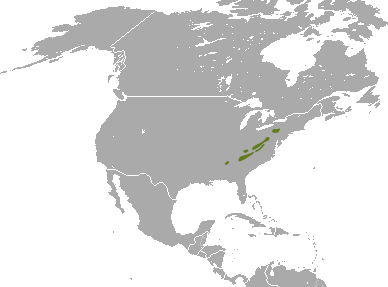
- Appalachian cottontail range

= Appalachian cottontail =

Species of mammal

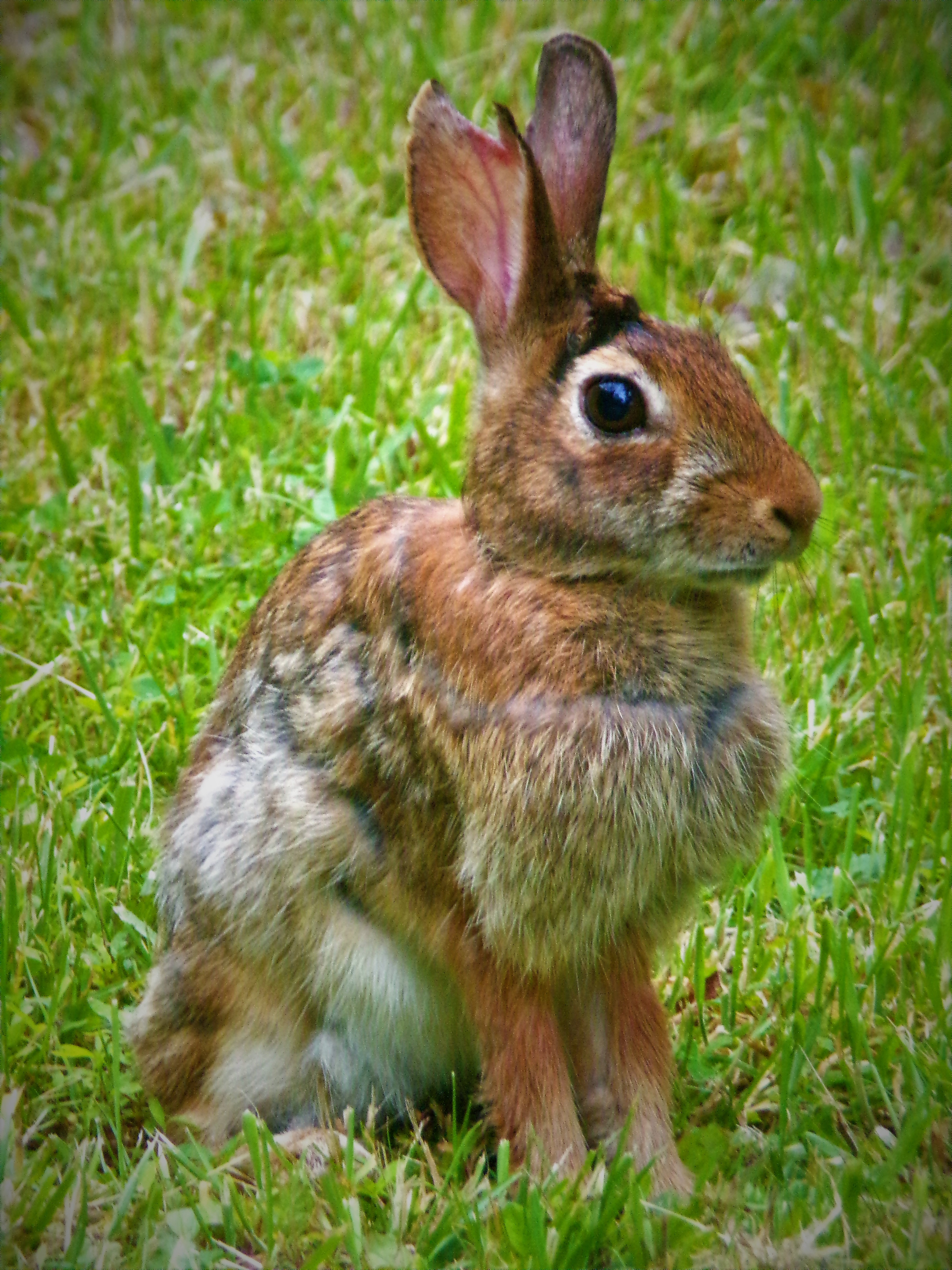
Appalachian cottontail in Pennsylvania.

The Appalachian cottontail (Sylvilagus obscurus) is a species of cottontail rabbit in the family Leporidae. It is a rare species found in the upland areas of the eastern United States.

== Taxonomy ==
The Appalachian cottontail was only recognized as separate from the New England cottontail (Sylvilagus transitionalis) in 1992. It was distinguished based on its unique skull structure and karyotype in a study by Joseph A. Chapman and colleagues, who gave the species the type locality of "Dolly Sods Scenic Area, Grant County, West Virginia". Compared to the New England cottontail, the Appalachian cottontail has six fewer chromosomes. It has no subspecies.

== Description ==
The Appalachian cottontail is a small light-yellow brown rabbit. It has brown and black mixed fur on its back and a brown and red patch along its neck. It is mostly white underneath. S. obscurus is often visually quite similar to the eastern cottontail; a distinguishing factor is a black spot between the ears and a lack of a white spot on the forehead. The Appalachian cottontail has an adult combined head and body length of 15 to 17 inches (39 to 43 cm) and a tail length of 0.9 to 2.6 inches (2.2 to 6.5 cm). Its ears measure between 2.0 and 2.4 inches (5 and 6 cm), and its hind feet are an average of 3.6 inches (9.2 cm) long. It is not easily distinguished from the New England cottontail since they share many of the same external characteristics, such as fur color and texture; they cannot be differentiated through body measurements either. The two species are most easily identified by their geographic location. Cottontails found south or west of the Hudson River are considered Appalachian cottontails; those found north and east are considered New England cottontails. The species can otherwise be identified by chromosome number and skull measurements. Female Appalachian cottontails are typically larger than males. The weight of the Appalachian Cottontail can range from as little as 756 grams (1.667 lb), up to as much as 1,153 grams (2.542 lb). The average length is 408 mm (16.1 in).

== Behavior and ecology ==
Sylvilagus obscurus is typically active around dusk or at dawn. During the day they typically avoid predators by sheltering under logs or in burrows. Hibernation does not play a factor due to the rabbit being active year-round. It is believed that there is a social hierarchy within the species, especially when it comes to mating, in which the males assert their dominance by fighting to gain mating priority.

=== Reproduction ===
An adult female can breed up to 3-4 times per season and have roughly 3-4 offspring per litter. The lifespan of S. obscurus is rather short, often less than a year.

=== Diet ===
The Appalachian cottontail generally feeds on vegetation such as blackberry, greenbriar, and mountain laurel, as well as bark and twigs of trees such as red maple, aspen, and black cherry. Usually its diet will consist of twigs, leaves, and fruits. Coprophagy, the eating of its own feces, often occurs as it is useful for it to take up certain vitamins and nutrients that were not digested well in the first pass of digestion. This type of diet is found in most of the genus Sylvilagus.

== Habitat and distribution ==
Appalachian cottontails are found in mountainous areas, typically from 610 to 762 m (2,001 to 2,500 ft) of elevation. They inhabit mountainous regions in the eastern U.S. ranging from Pennsylvania to South Carolina and being most prominent in the Appalachians. S. obscurus is better adapted to colder climates than its distant relative, the eastern cottontail. The Appalachian Mountains provide for S. obscurus a habitat with cover and vegetation such as blackberry, greenbriar, and mountain laurel.

== Threats ==
There are several threats that have endangered the survival of S. obscurus. These involve the destruction and maturation of habitat, as well as habitat fragmentation due to urban development, which exposes the cottontail to increased predatation. Hunting is a common cause of death of Appalachian cottontails.
