= David J. Cook (administrator) =

Higher education administrator and president

David Cook
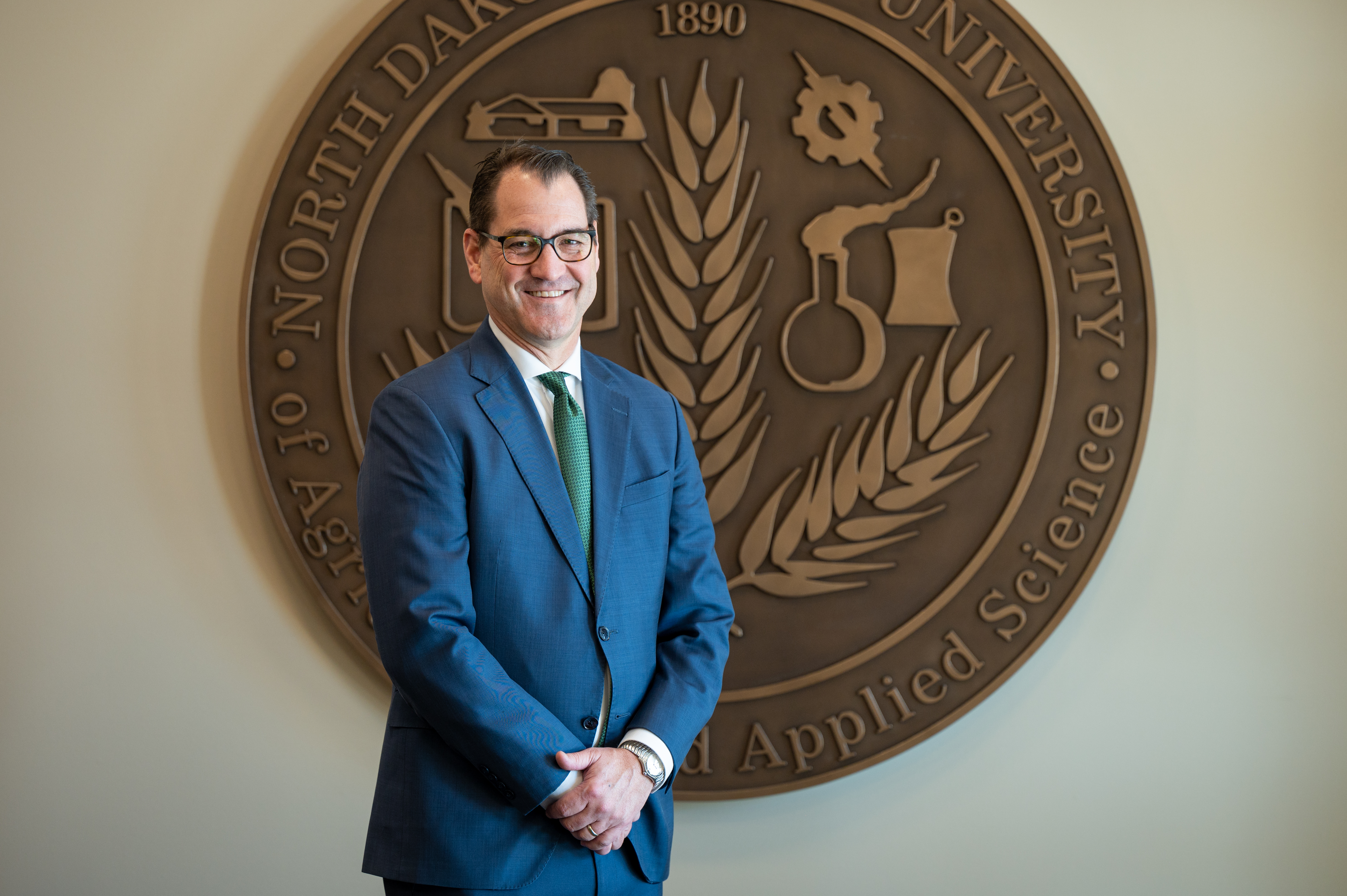
- Cook in 2022

President of Iowa State University
- Incumbent
- Assumed office March 1, 2026
- Preceded by: Wendy Wintersteen

15th President of North Dakota State University
- In office May 17, 2022 – February 9, 2026
- Preceded by: Dean L. Bresciani
- Succeeded by: Rick Berg (interim)

Personal details
- Born: Ames, Iowa, U.S.
- Spouse: Katie Cook
- Education: Iowa State University (BA); University of Kansas (MA, PhD)

Academic background
- Thesis: Communication strategies and Chinese organizational commitment in American firms in China (1999)
- Doctoral advisor: Cal Downs

Academic work
- Discipline: organizational communication
- Institutions: University of Kansas Edwards Campus; University of Kansas; North Dakota State University; Iowa State University

David J. Cook is an American academic and administrator, who is serving as the 17th president of Iowa State University. He previously served as the president of North Dakota State University.

== Life and education ==
David J. Cook was born and raised in Ames, Iowa. He is married to his wife, Katie Cook, and they have three children: Ella, Peyton, and Gage.

Cook attended Iowa State University and graduated in 1992 with a Bachelor of Arts in political science and speech communication. In 1995, Cook graduated from the University of Kansas (KU) with his Master of Arts degree in organizational communication and continued on to graduate with his PhD in organizational communication in 1998.

== Career ==
=== University of Kansas ===
After receiving his PhD, Cook worked as a senior administrator at the University of Kansas Medical Center for 14 years. His titles included: associate vice chancellor of the Institute for Community Engagement, associate director of the Institute of Community and Public Health, executive director of the Midwest Cancer Alliance, assistant vice chancellor for public affairs, and director of health and technology outreach.

In 2013, Cook was named the vice chancellor for the University of Kansas Edwards Campus and dean of the School of Professional Studies. He moved to the main campus of the University of Kansas in Lawrence, Kansas, in 2020 as the vice chancellor of public affairs and economic development. As a senior advisor to chancellor Douglas Girod, Cook oversaw internal and external messaging, outreach, and public relations. He also advised on issues related to communication, public affairs, and economic development

Cook was named an American Council on Education fellow in 2011. He completed his fellowship at the University of North Carolina at Chapel Hill. During his fellowship, Cook studied the School of Public Health.

He is the author of numerous publications and has taught both in the School of Medicine and College of Liberal Arts and Sciences at the University of Kansas.

=== North Dakota State University ===
In January 2022, Cook was named one of five finalists for the position of president at North Dakota State University in Fargo, North Dakota. The State Board of Higher Education (SBHE) in North Dakota named David J. Cook the 15th president of North Dakota State University on February 23, 2022. He assumed the position on May 17, 2022, succeeding Dean L. Bresciani. Cook's final day at NDSU was February 9, 2026.

=== Iowa State University ===
In 2025, Cook was named president of Iowa State University, succeeding Wendy Wintersteen.

== Awards and honors ==
- 2013, JHAWK Faculty Appreciation Award, University of Kansas Medical Center
