= List of presidents of North Dakota State University =

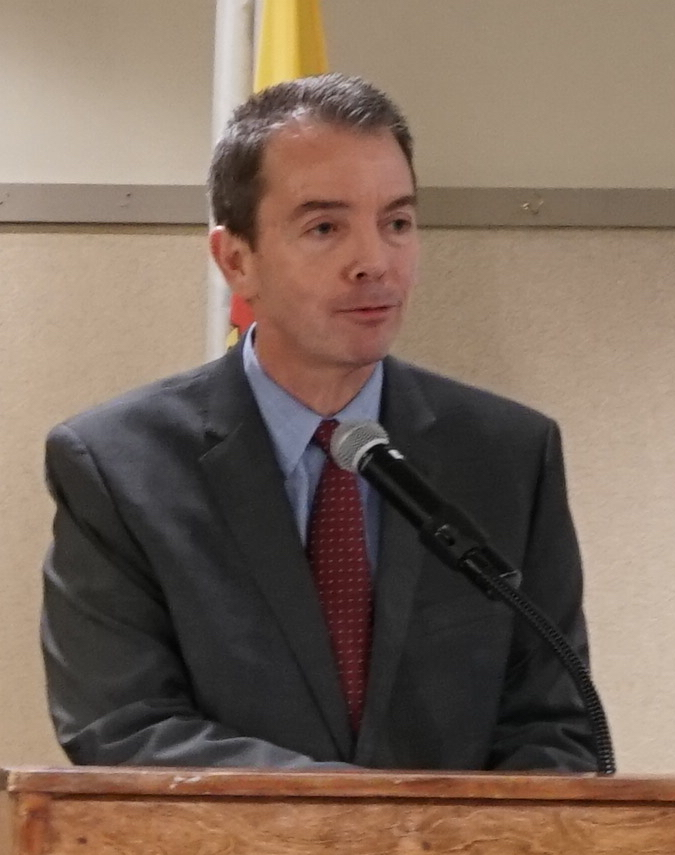
Current president Marshall Stewart in 2019

The following is a complete list of the presidents of North Dakota State University (which is located in Fargo, North Dakota).

- (1890–1893) Horace E. Stockbridge
- (1893–1895) J. B. Powers*
- (1895–1916) John H. Worst
- (1916–1921) Edwin F. Ladd
- (February – September, 1921) Edward S. Keene*
- (1921–1929) John Lee Coulter
- (July – September, 1929) A. E. Minard*
- (1929–1937) John B. Shepperd
- (1937–1938) John C. West*
- (1938–1946) Frank L. Eversull
- (June – July, 1946) Charles A. Sevrinson*
- (1946–1948) John H. Longwell
- (1948–1961) Fred S. Hultz
- (1961–1962) Arlon G. Hazen*
- (1962–1967) H. R. Albrecht
- (1968–1987) L. D. Loftsgard
- (October, 1987 – May, 1988) Robert Koob*
- (1988–1995) J. L. Ozbun
- (1995–1998) Thomas R. Plough
- (1998–June, 1999) Allan Fischer*
- (1999–2009) Joseph A. Chapman
- (December, 2009 – July, 2010) Richard Hansen*
- (2010–2022) Dean L. Bresciani
- (2022–2026) David J. Cook
- (February – May, 2026) Rick Berg*
- (2026–) Marshall Stewart
(*- acting)
