= Albert J. Simone =

American academic

Albert Joseph Simone

8th President of the Rochester Institute of Technology
- In office 1992–2007
- Preceded by: M. Richard Rose
- Succeeded by: William W. Destler

Personal details
- Born: December 16, 1935 (age 90) Boston, Massachusetts
- Spouse: Carolie
- Parent: Edward Simone; Mary DiGiovanni
- Education: Tufts University; Massachusetts Institute of Technology
- Profession: Administrator

Albert Joseph Simone (born December, 1935 in Boston, Massachusetts) is a former president of Rochester Institute of Technology (RIT) and the University of Hawaiʻi System.

Simone earned his Bachelor of Arts in economics from Tufts in 1957, and his PhD in economics from Massachusetts Institute of Technology in 1962.

He served as dean of the College of Business Administration at the University of Cincinnati from 1972 to 1983.

After the retirement of Fujio Matsuda, Simone was both Chancellor of the University of Hawaiʻi at Mānoa and President of the University of Hawaiʻi System from 1984 to 1992. As President at Mānoa, Simone lobbied for greater independence from the Hawaiian legislature's control in order to retain accreditation. During his tenure, the university consolidated departments, research institutes and federal cooperative programs from different parts of campus into the School of Ocean and Earth Sciences and Technology, a leading education and research resource.

He became president of Rochester Institute of Technology on September 1, 1992, succeeding Thomas R. Plough. His tenure at RIT saw additional PhD programs (in microsystems engineering, computing and information sciences, and color science) inaugurated and improvements made to RIT's athletic program (such as the construction of the Gordon Field House and Activities Center and the elevation of the men's hockey team to Division I).

He retired from Rochester Institute of Technology on July 1, 2007, succeeded by William W. Destler.

June 15, 2007 was proclaimed Albert J. Simone Day in Rochester and Monroe County.

Simone served as a Class C director of the Federal Reserve Bank of New York from January 2000 to January 2003.

== Author ==
From 1965 to 1969 Simone authored five books.

Academic offices
| Preceded by Fujio Matsuda | President of the University of Hawaii; 1984–1992 | Succeeded by Kenneth P. Mortimer |
| Preceded by Thomas R. Plough (acting) | President of the Rochester Institute of Technology; September 1, 1992 – July 1, 2007 | Succeeded by William W. Destler |
