= Culture of French Canada =

The Culture of French Canada, French Canadian Culture or the Culture of Francophone Canadians may refer to:

- The culture of Quebec
- Acadian culture, the culture of the French-speaking people of Acadia, in the Maritime provinces
- The culture of Franco-Ontarians, the French-speaking people of Ontario
- The culture of Franco-Manitobans, the French-speaking people of Manitoba

== See also ==
- Francophone Canadians
- French Canadian
- French language in Canada
- French Canada (disambiguation)
