= Fujio Matsuda =

9th President of the University of Hawaii (1924–2020)

- Born: October 18, 1924; Honolulu, Hawaii, U.S.
- Died: August 23, 2020 (aged 95)
- Education: Rose-Hulman Institute of Technology, Massachusetts Institute of Technology
- Occupations: Engineering researcher, Professor of Engineering, President of University of Hawaii
- Spouse: Amy Saiki

Fujio "Fudge" Matsuda (松田 富士夫) (October 18, 1924 – August 23, 2020) was the first Japanese American president of the University of Hawaii. This position also made him the first Asian American to become president of a major university in the United States.

== Early life and education ==
Matsuda was born in Honolulu, Hawaii on October 18, 1924 to Yoshio and Shimo Matsuda, immigrants from Yamaguchi, Japan. Matsuda grew up in Kaka'ako, and graduated from McKinley High School in 1942.

In 1943, Matsuda joined the 442nd Infantry. After World War II ended, Matsuda studied for two years at the University of Hawaii, then transferred and graduated from Rose Polytechnic Institute in 1949. In the same year, he married Amy Saiki. In 1952 he earned a doctorate in structural engineering from MIT.

== Career ==
After earning his doctoral degree, Matsuda worked as a researcher at MIT for two years, then at the University of Illinois for one year. He then returned to Hawaii and taught in the University of Hawaii's engineering department from 1955 to 1962. During this time, he also worked at a small engineering firm. In 1962 he was appointed the director of the Hawaii Engineering Experiment Station, but was asked by John A. Burns to lead the Hawaii Department of Transportation, before he could assume that role. Matsuda led the Department of Transportation from 1963 to 1973. In 1973, Matsuda returned to the university as the vice president of business affairs.

On July 14, 1974, Matsuda was appointed the ninth president of the University of Hawaii. During his tenure, several dormitories and eight buildings, including the Richardson School of Law, were built. He also reorganized the community college system so that each one would have a chancellor. He resigned on May 31, 1984, and was succeeded by Albert J. Simone. In 1985, the Fujio Matsuda Education Center at Windward Community College was built and named after him. Matsuda eventually retired in 1996, after serving for ten years as the director of UH's Research Corporation and for two years as the president of the Japan America Institute of Management Science.

After retiring, Matsuda was on the boards of several non-profit organizations, including for the Japanese Cultural Center of Hawaii just after its near-closure in 2003. In 2004, Matsuda was honored as a Living Treasure of Hawaii.

Matsuda died at his home in 2020, at the age of 95.
