= Dean L. Bresciani =

American academic administrator

Dr. Dean L. Bresciani
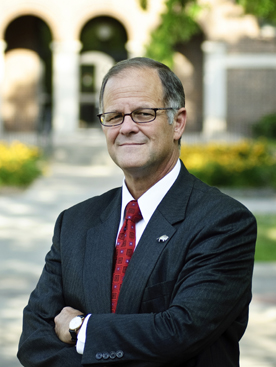
- Bresicani in 2010

14th President of North Dakota State University
- In office June 15, 2010 – May 16, 2022
- Preceded by: Joseph A. Chapman
- Succeeded by: David J. Cook

Personal details
- Born: Napa Valley, California
- Education: California State Polytechnic University, Humboldt (BA); Bowling Green State University (MA); University of Arizona (PhD)

Dean L. Bresciani is an American academic who served as the 14th president of North Dakota State University in Fargo from 2010 to 2022.

== Early life and education ==
Bresciani is a native of Napa Valley, California. He grew up on his family homestead in rural northern California.

Bresciani attended Humboldt State University in Arcata, California, where he graduated with his bachelor's degree in sociology in 1984. In 1985, he received his master's in college student personnel from Bowling Green State University in Bowling Green, Ohio. He received his doctorate in higher education finance, with a doctoral minor in economics, from University of Arizona in Tucson, Arizona, in 1996. His dissertation was titled, "Explanation of Administrative Costs: A Case Study."

== Career ==
Bresciani was the vice president of student affairs from 2004 to 2008 and full professor in the department of educational administration through 2010 at Texas A&M University in College Station, Texas.

Previously, he worked in senior administrative roles in student services and student affairs at the University of North Carolina at Chapel Hill and in various roles at the University of Nebraska at Kearney, including director of residence life. Bresicani has also served in administrative and faculty positions at public universities in Arizona, Minnesota, Wisconsin, Ohio, and California.

In 2017, Bresciani was named a presidential finalist for Ohio University in Athens, Ohio. He later withdrew his candidacy.

He has held national leadership positions in professional organizations, including council chair for the Association of Public and Land-grant Universities and board of directors for the National Association of Student Personnel Administrators. He is a member of the Council for the Advancement and Support of Education, EDUCAUSE, Association for the Study of Higher Education, National Association of College and University Business Officers, and the National Association of Student Personnel Administrators.

== North Dakota State University ==
Dean L. Bresciani was named the 14th president of North Dakota State University on May 24, 2010, succeeding Joseph A. Chapman and interim president, Dick Hanson. He began his term as president on June 15, 2010.

During his 12-year term, NDSU regained its R1 status in 2021 from the Carnegie Classification of Institutions of Higher Education. The NDSU Foundation also announced the statewide record for fundraising with the six-year "In Our Hands" campaign that raised $586.7 million.

Major projects during his presidency include completion of Cater Hall, Aldevron Tower, A. Glenn Hill Center, Sanford Health Athletic Complex, and Sugihara Hall. Ground was also broken for the Peltier Agricultural Complex, Nodak Insurance Company Football Performance Complex, and Grandmother Earth's Gift of Life Garden.

In 2015, Bresciani was selected for the NCAA Division I Presidential Forum. Bresciani was the first president from any North Dakota college or university to join a major leadership group in the NCAA.

Bresciani plans to become a distinguished professor in health sciences upon his resignation from the presidency in 2022.

In his 2021 State of the University Address, Bresciani announced his entire estate would be left to NDSU. On April 28, 2022, the President Dean L. Bresciani Endowed Chair in Leadership was announced by the NDSU Foundation. The endowment will support leaders on the NDSU campus.

Fargo mayor Tim Mahoney officially recognized May 16, 2022, as Dean Bresciani Day to commemorate his last day in office.

== Controversies ==
In 2013, an investigation was launched into whether NDSU violated open records laws by intentionally deleting nearly 45,000 emails from Bresciani's university account after an open records request from North Dakota lawmakers. Later, lawyers from both NDSU and the North Dakota University System (NDUS) said the emails had been recovered and were likely deleted due to an auto-purge function.

In 2016, Bresciani sent “inappropriate” text messages regarding later reversed media rules for the NDSU athletics coverage. The same year, Bresciani was critiqued by North Dakota lawmakers and the NDUS chancellor Mark Hagerott for purchasing a business-class ticket for a week-long trip to India. The travel policy was later changed to note all system presidents must travel coach.

In 2021, Bresciani was censured by the NDSU faculty senate for appointing then-interim provost (education) Margaret Fitzgerald to the permanent role, despite a national search and interview process. The senate cited Bresciani's circumvention of policy for the censure.

Bresciani's contract was not fully renewed by the State Board of Higher Education in 2021. This is largely credited to a single critical performance review of Bresciani which external observers broadly recognized as unfounded.

== Awards and honors ==
- 2022, President Dean L. Bresciani Leadership Endowed Chair, North Dakota State University Foundation and Alumni Association, Fargo, ND
- 2022, Faculty Senate Resolution of Recognition and Contributions, North Dakota State University Faculty Senate, Fargo, ND
- 2022, Chief Executive Leadership Award, Council for Advancement and Support of Education (CASE) District VI
- 2021, Outstanding Employer Support of the Guard and Reserve Award, U.S. Department of Defense and ESGR, Fargo, ND
- 2016, Distinguished Leadership Award, North Dakota Forest Service
- 2015, Presidential Excellence Award, National Association of Student Personnel Administrators Region IV-West
- 2013, Higher Education Distinguished Alumnus Award, Bowling Green State University
- 2013, Phi Kappa Phi Honor Society, North Dakota State University
- 2012, Distinguished Alumnus Award, Humboldt State University
- 2008, Administrator of the Year, Texas A&M University
- 2007, Newsmaker Image Award, Texas A&M University
- 2004, Frank Porter Graham Honor Society
- 2004, Order of the Golden Fleece, University of North Carolina at Chapel Hill
- 2004, Pillar of the Profession Award, National Association of Student Personnel Administrators
- 2004, Student Advocacy Award, University of North Carolina at Chapel Hill
- 2000, Foundation of Excellence Award, Association of College and University Housing Officers – International
- 1994, Mortar Board Honor Society Inductee for Outstanding Teaching Service, University of Nebraska at Kearney
- 1985, President's Award for Distinguished Service, Bowling Green State University
- 1984, Man of the Year, Humboldt State University
- Honorary inductee of Golden Key International Honour Society (2005) and Alpha Phi Omega National Service Fraternity (2007)

== Citations ==
- NDSU President Dean L. Bresciani Biography
- Huebner, R. (2022, May 13). Bresciani looks back on 12 years as NDSU president: 'I wish I could do it again'. The Forum. https://www.inforum.com/news/fargo/bresciani-looks-back-on-12-years-as-ndsu-president-i-wish-i-could-do-it-again?
