= Ashton Grant =

American football coach

New England Patriots
- Title: Quarterbacks coach

Personal information
- Born: 1996 (age 29–30); Connecticut, U.S.

Career information
- Position: Wide receiver
- High school: Manchester (CT)
- College: Assumption

Career history

Playing
- Chicago Bears (2018)*; Kansas City Chiefs (2018)*; Salt Lake Stallions (2019)
- * Offseason or practice squad member only

Coaching
- Holy Cross (2019) Quality control coach; Cleveland Browns (2020–2024); Bill Walsh coaching fellow (2020–2021); Offensive quality control coach (2021–2022); Offensive assistant/quarterbacks (2023–2024); New England Patriots (2025–present) Quarterbacks coach

Ashton Grant (born c. 1996) is an American football coach who is currently the quarterbacks coach for the New England Patriots of the National Football League (NFL).

== Playing career ==
Grant played football at Manchester High School in Manchester, Connecticut, before spending a postgraduate year at East Coast Prep. He attended Assumption University, where he set school records for career receiving yards (3,204), career touchdown receptions (36), and single-season touchdown receptions (13). Grant was named the Northeast-10 Conference Offensive Player of the Year and a three-time all-conference selection. After college, he attended training camp with the Kansas City Chiefs and Chicago Bears before playing one season with the Salt Lake Stallions of the Alliance of American Football.

== Coaching career ==
Grant got his first coaching job in 2019, where he was hired by the Holy Cross Crusaders as a quality control coach. In 2020, he got his first NFL coaching job, joining the Cleveland Browns as the team's first recipient of the Bill Walsh Coaching Fellowship. Ahead of the 2022 season, Grant was promoted by the Browns to serve as an offensive quality control coach. In 2023, he was once again promoted to quarterbacks coach and offensive assistant.

On February 1, 2025, Grant was hired by Mike Vrabel to serve as the New England Patriots' quarterbacks coach.
