= Thomas R. Plough =

American sociologist and academic administrator

Thomas Robert Plough
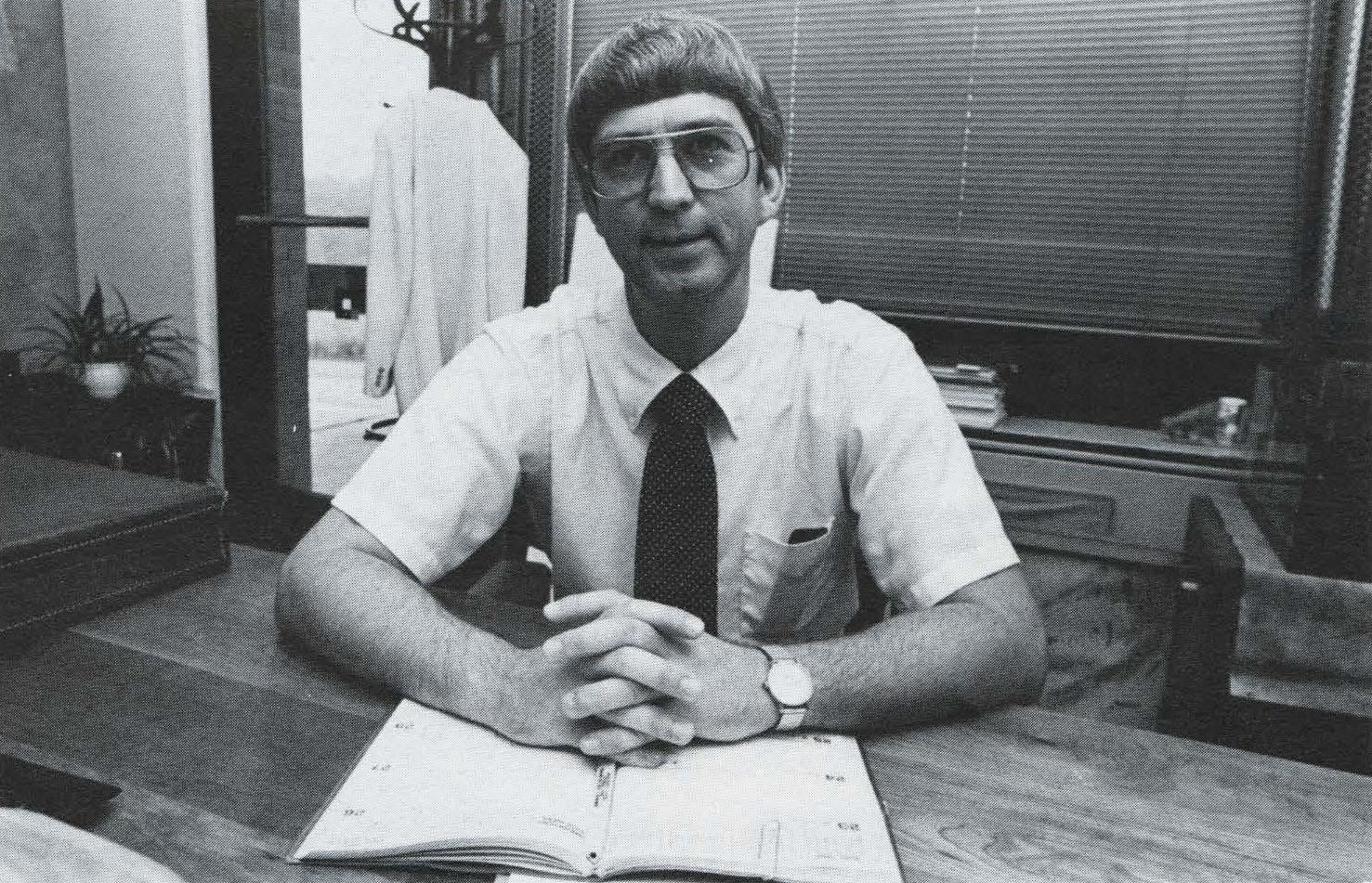
- Plough in 1980
- Born: 1941 (age 84–85); Traverse City, Michigan, U.S.
- Education: Michigan State University
- Occupations: Sociologist, academic administrator

Thomas Robert Plough (born 1941) is an American sociologist most notable for having served as president of North Dakota State University and Assumption College.

Plough is a graduate of Michigan State University. He began his career at Alma College, where he rose to serve as dean of students. He moved to the Eisenhower College and later the Rochester Institute of Technology where he was eventually appointed provost. He also briefly served as acting RIT president in 1991 and again in 1992. Plough resigned in the wake of the same scandal that led to the early retirement of M. Richard Rose.

Plough assumed the presidency of North Dakota State University in 1995 and moved to Assumption College in 1998. He announced his retirement in August 2006.

Academic offices
Vacant Title last held by Robert G. Quinn	Provost of the Rochester Institute of Technology; Spring 1984 – July 1994	Succeeded by Stanley D. McKenzie
Preceded by M. Richard Rose	President of the Rochester Institute of Technology (acting); February 1991 – June 1991	Succeeded by M. Richard Rose
Preceded by M. Richard Rose	President of the Rochester Institute of Technology (acting); June 1, 1992 – September 1, 1992	Succeeded by Albert J. Simone
Preceded by J. L. Ozbun	President of North Dakota State University; July 1, 1995 – June 30, 1998	Succeeded by Joseph A. Chapman
Preceded by Joseph H. Hagan	President of Assumption College; July 1, 1998 – June 30, 2007	Succeeded by Francesco Cesareo
