= Assumption Preparatory School =

Boarding school in Massachusetts, USA

Information
- Religious affiliation: Assumptionists
- Established: 1904
- Closed: 1970
- Affiliation: Assumption University

Assumption Preparatory School (for a while previously known as Assumption High School) was an American secondary boarding school located in Worcester, Massachusetts, and operated by the Catholic order Augustinians of the Assumption. It was closely associated with Assumption College: both trace their beginnings to 1904, when they were founded by French clergymen with the assistance of French-speaking Americans.

== History ==
Founded in 1904 by French clerics of the Augustinians of the Assumption, the school came into being alongside Assumption College. The school shared its campus with the College, and grew in size, reaching 400 students at one point, and reputation, benefiting intellectually from its co-location with the college. Instruction was French-oriented and often given in the French language, with class groupings referred to as "Eléments" and great importance given to the learning of French, Franco-American culture, and French Canadian culture, in addition to Catholic teachings. Following French custom, classes were held on Saturday mornings, but not on Wednesday or Saturday afternoons. Philosophically, the priests at the school emphasized using rational analysis in the pursuit of truth. School authorities behaved in a firm but fairly reasonable manner. Basketball was the most popular sport at the school.

In 1953, a tornado destroyed the campus. The College was moved to a different site within Worcester, but the Preparatory School was rebuilt on the same spot. The 1960s saw financial troubles, dwindling enrollment, and an aging staff. Assumption Preparatory School was as a result closed in June 1970.

The physical campus of the school subsequently became part of Quinsigamond Community College. Assumption Preparatory School graduates are included in the alumni activities of Assumption College, which is still in operation.

== Graduates ==
Among the graduates of Assumption Preparatory School was the future U.S. Senator from Alaska and 2008 presidential candidate Mike Gravel in 1949.
