= Greg Weiner (political scientist) =

American journalist, political scientist and author

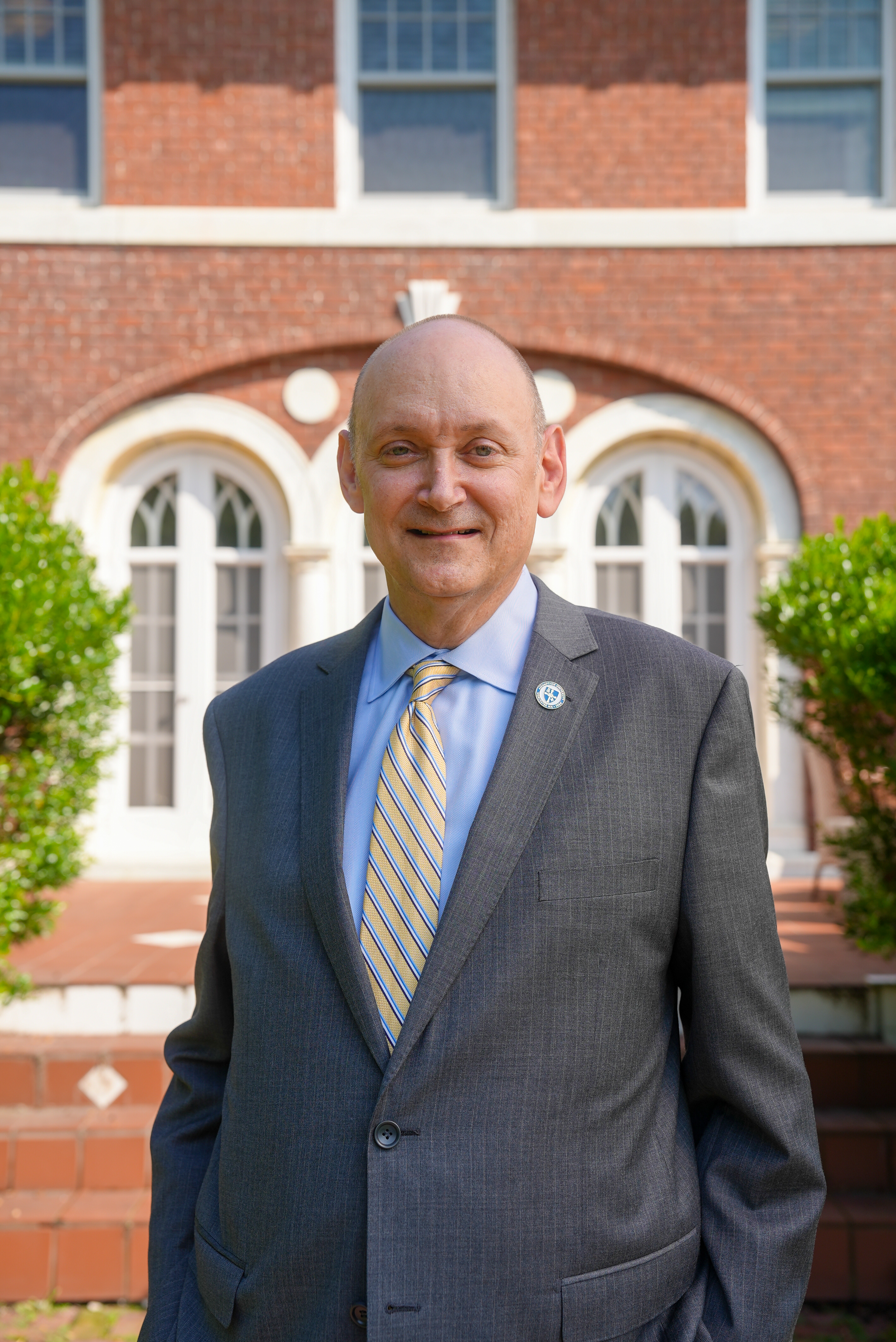

17th President of Assumption University
- Incumbent
- Assumed office March 23, 2023
- Preceded by: Francesco Cesareo

Personal details
- Born: June 27, 1969 (age 57) Luling, Texas, U.S.
- Education: University of Texas at Austin (BA); Georgetown University (MA, PhD)

Gregory S. Weiner (born 1969) is an American academic administrator. He is the president of Assumption University in Worcester, Massachusetts. Weiner is the first Jewish president of a Catholic college or university in the United States. Before he was appointed president, Weiner served as the school's provost and academic vice president and as a professor of political science.

== Early life and education ==
Weiner was born in Luling, Texas in 1969. His grandparents emigrated to the US from Poland. Weiner attended the University of Texas at Austin, where he was editor of the Daily Texan. He earned a bachelor of arts degree in government from the university in 1991. He then attended Georgetown University, where he earned a master of arts degree in liberal studies in 2005 and a Ph.D. in government in 2010. Additionally, he completed a postdoctoral fellowship at Brown University.

== Career ==
Weiner began his career in journalism, working as a reporter for the Williamson County Sun in Georgetown, Texas.

He then moved to Washington, D.C. where he served as a staff assistant and deputy press secretary for U.S. Senators Lloyd Bentsen and Bob Krueger, both from Texas. Weiner then went on to work in the office of U.S. Senator J. Robert Kerrey of Nebraska, serving as senior aide, press secretary, communications director, and policy director, from 1993 through 1999. In 1996, Weiner took a leave of absence to serve as the statewide campaign manager for U.S. Senate candidate Victor Morales of Texas.

In 1999, Weiner founded Content Communications, LLC, a political and public relations writing firm for cabinet members, governors, senators, and Fortune 500 CEOs. He served as its president until 2010.

Weiner served as an assistant professor, associate professor, and professor of political science at Assumption University from 2011 through 2022. He also served as provost and academic vice president from 2019 through 2022 and was appointed interim president of the university in 2022.

Weiner has been the president of Assumption University since 2023. Weiner helped to establish, with faculty, the Foundations Program, a core curriculum for the university. In 2024, it was announced by Assumption's board of trustees that Weiner was reappointed for a five-year term through May 2030.

Weiner is the author of four books: Madison's Metronome: The Constitution, Majority Rule, and the Tempo of American Politics (2012), American Burke: The Uncommon Liberalism of Daniel Patrick Moynihan (2015, The Political Constitution: The Case Against Judicial Supremacy (2019) and Old Whigs: Burke, Lincoln, and the Politics of Prudence (2019). Weiner has written for The New York Times and The Washington Post. He has also had pieces published in The Wall Street Journal, National Affairs, and The Jerusalem Post.

His scholarship in political science focuses on subjects such as the political thought of James Madison, the separation of powers, the American presidency, and constitutional issues.

== Personal life ==
Weiner resides outside Worcester, Massachusetts, with his family. He is the brother of Zach Weinersmith, a cartoonist and writer, and Marty Weiner, former founding engineer at Pinterest and Reddit's first Chief Technology Officer.

== Selected publications ==
=== Books ===
- Weiner, Greg (2012). Madison's Metronome: The Constitution, Majority Rule, and the Tempo of American Politics. American political thought. Project Muse. Lawrence: University Press of Kansas. ISBN 978-0-7006-1840-8.
- Weiner, Greg (2015). American Burke: the uncommon liberalism of Daniel Patrick Moynihan. American political thought. Lawrence, Kansas: University Press of Kansas. ISBN 978-0-7006-2096-8.
- Weiner, Greg (2019). Old Whigs: Burke, Lincoln, and the politics of prudence. New York: Encounter Books. ISBN 978-1-64177-050-7.
- Weiner, Greg (2019). The political constitution: the case against judicial supremacy. Lawrence, Kansas: University Press of Kansas. ISBN 978-0-7006-2837-7.

=== Columns ===
- "George Will, Burkean". Law and Liberty (July 5, 2016).
- "Impeachment's Political Heart". The New York Times (May 18, 2017).
- "The President's Self Destructive Disruption". The New York Times (Oct. 11, 2017).
- "It's all about the president now". The Washington Post (Oct. 26, 2017).
- "The Power of the Courts is Messing up Politics". The New York Times (Nov. 12, 2017).
- "There will be no winners in the Supreme Court's wedding cake case". The Washington Post (Dec. 4, 2017).
- "The Scoundrel Theory of American Politics". The New York Times (Dec. 8, 2017).
- "How Not to Impeach". The New York Times (Jan. 2, 2018).
- "No, Congress should not protect Robert Mueller". The Washington Post (Feb. 1, 2018).
- "Wayne LaPierre's Unconstitutionalism". The New York Times (Feb. 28, 2018).
- "When Liberals Become Progressives, Much is Lost". The New York Times (Apr. 13, 2018).
- "Congress Doesn't Seem to Know its Own Strength". The New York Times (Jun. 21, 2018).
- "Nancy Pelosi's First Order of Business Should be to Reclaim the Power of the House". The New York Times (Nov. 9, 2018).
- "For Trump, the Personal is Political". The New York Times (Jan. 19, 2019).
- "Our Constitutional Emergency". The New York Times (Mar. 26, 2019).
- "It's Not Always the End of the World". The New York Times (May 26, 2019).
- "The Trump Fallacy". The New York Times (Jun. 30, 2019).
- "A Haven from the Ivy League's Madness". The Wall Street Journal (Dec. 21, 2023).
- "Viewpoint: Liberal arts' impact on the economy". Worcester Business Journal (Jan. 22, 2024).
- "American Jews should take a look at Catholic universities - opinion". The Jerusalem Post (May 2, 2024).
- "Campus Protestors Hijack Academic Freedom". The Wall Street Journal (Oct. 11, 2024).
- "The real antidote to political bitterness". The Washington Post (Nov. 21, 2024).
- "Colleges Have to Be Much More Honest With Themselves". The New York Times (Mar. 29, 2025).
- "AI's best use is enhancing human judgment. So study liberal arts." The Washington Post (Mar. 2, 2026).
