= Paul A. Miller =

American academic administrator (1917–2015)

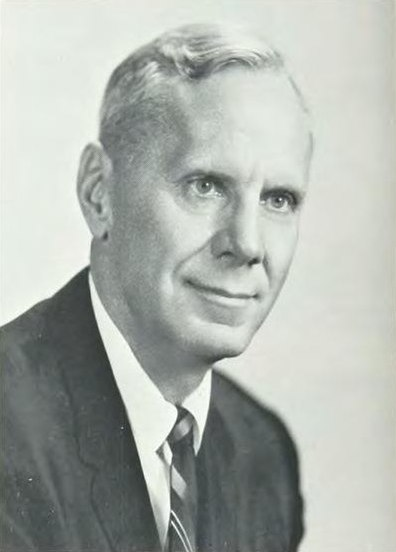
- Miller circa 1969

6th President of the Rochester Institute of Technology
- In office 1969–1979
- Preceded by: Mark W. Ellingson
- Succeeded by: M. Richard Rose

Personal details
- Born: Paul Ausborn Miller; March 22, 1917 East Liverpool, Ohio, U.S.
- Died: June 5, 2015 (aged 98) Montrose, Colorado, U.S.
- Spouse(s): Catherine Spiker; Francena Lounsbery
- Children: 2
- Education: West Virginia University (BS); Michigan State University (PhD)

Military service
- Branch/service: United States Army
- Battles/wars: World War II

Paul Ausborn Miller (March 22, 1917 – June 5, 2015) was an American academic administrator who served as the 6th president of the Rochester Institute of Technology from 1969–1979. He oversaw the completion of the move of the campus to Henrietta and the steady growth of RIT between 1969 and 1981.

== Early life and education ==
Born in East Liverpool, Ohio, Miller spent most of his childhood on a small family farm in West Virginia. His father operated the farm part-time and supplemented the family's income with factory work. As a boy, he participated in 4-H. Miller attended Bethany College before earning a bachelor's degree in agriculture from West Virginia University in 1939.

== Career ==
Miller's first job was as an agent at the agricultural extensions for Ritchie and Nicholas Counties. In 1942, he enlisted in the United States Army Air Corps as a navigator.

After World War II ended, he studied for a doctorate in anthropology and sociology at Michigan State College. After graduating in 1953, Miller worked as a professor of Sociology at Michigan State, becoming director of the Cooperative Extension and eventually provost. He moved back to West Virginia to assume the presidency of West Virginia University in 1962, where he promoted the university's agricultural extension. In 1966, Lyndon Johnson appointed him the first assistant secretary for education in the United States Department of Health, Education, and Welfare where he was responsible for making the arrangements for the National Technical Institute for the Deaf to start operations.

He helped establish the Colombian Institute of Agriculture in Bogotá and the Morogoro Institute of Technology in Tanzania.

Anticipating the change in administrations in 1967, Miller accepted a lecturing position at the University of North Carolina at Charlotte.

=== Rochester Institute of Technology ===
In 1969, he became president of the Rochester Institute of Technology which had moved from its old campus in downtown Rochester, New York to a much larger campus on a former farm in the suburb of Henrietta, New York. Miller inherited a nearly 12% budget deficit, the result of declining enrollment, higher attrition, and higher costs for the new campus which resulted in several years of austerity. Miller implemented zero-based budgeting, forecasting of student enrollment, and made the dormitories co-ed. Additionally, Miller quelled student demonstrations in the wake of the Kent State shootings and oversaw precautions taken to defend against the flooding of Hurricane Agnes. Miller attempted to overcome persistent vandalism of the dormitories by staying in them with the students and later instituting a carrot-and-stick repair or improve budget for each dorm. Miller improved faculty compensation and student representation in the Institute equivalent of the faculty senate. Miller hired RIT's first provost, Todd Bullard, in 1970.

=== Later career ===
After stepping down from RIT in 1979, Miller served in a number of volunteer and civic roles including heading the advisory committee of the W. K. Kellogg Foundation, worked to form Greater Rochester Fights Back, an anti-drug advocacy group, and served on the board of trustees of both Nazareth College and Monroe Savings Bank. He was briefly a director of the Federal Reserve Bank of New York Buffalo Branch.

After retiring from RIT, he taught as an adjunct professor at the University of Missouri. He funded the Paul A. Miller Professorship in Adult and Continuing Adult Education at RIT after retiring and the Paul A. and Francena L. Miller Presidential Scholarship at WVU in 2006.

== Personal life ==
Miller married Catherine Spiker and raised a son and a daughter. He later married social science professor Francena Lounsbery.

He moved to Montrose, Colorado in 2011.

== Selected works ==
- Miller, Paul A.; Beegle, J. Allan (1947). The Farm People of Livingston County, Michigan. East Lansing, Michigan: Michigan State College Press. OCLC 6122526.
- Miller, Paul A. (1953). Community Health Action. East Lansing, Michigan: Michigan State College Press. OCLC 16766011.
- Miller, Paul A.; Gass, Gertrude Z.; Senders, Virginia L. (1967). The University in Motion: The Status of Women. Urbana, Illinois: University of Illinois at Urbana–Champaign. OCLC 32815857.
- Miller, Paul A. (2014). Bridging Campus and Community: Events, Excerpts, and Expectations for Strengthening America's Collaborative Competence. Paul A. Miller. ISBN 9781500384746. OCLC 902681373.

Academic offices
Preceded by Elvis Jacob Stahr Jr.	President of West Virginia University; 1962–1966	Succeeded by James Gindling Harlow
Preceded by Mark W. Ellingson	President of the Rochester Institute of Technology; October 1, 1969 – January 1, 1979	Succeeded by M. Richard Rose
