= M. Richard Rose =

American academic (1933–2021)

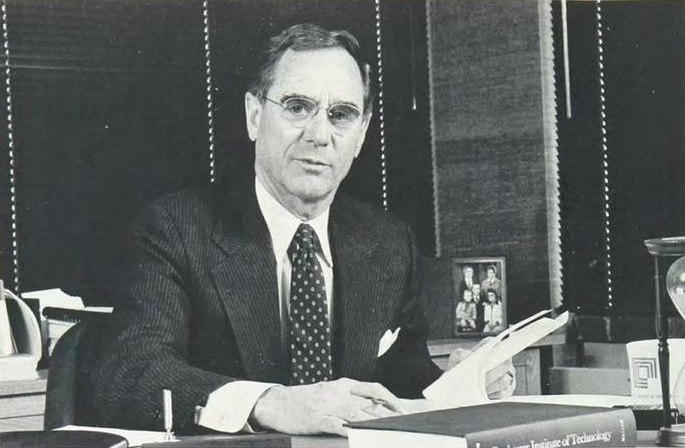
- Rose, c. 1988

7th President of the Rochester Institute of Technology
- In office 1979–1992
- Preceded by: Paul A. Miller
- Succeeded by: Albert J. Simone

10th President of Alfred University
- In office 1974–1978
- Preceded by: Leland W. Miles
- Succeeded by: S. Gene Odle

Personal details
- Born: Merle Richard Rose; March 6, 1933 Fredonia, Pennsylvania, U.S.
- Died: April 10, 2021 (aged 88) Brooksville, Florida, U.S.
- Spouse: Clarice Ratzlaff
- Children: 3
- Education: Slippery Rock State College; Westminster College; University of Pittsburgh (Ph.D.)
- Profession: Administrator; Professor
- Military career
- Allegiance: United States
- Branch: United States Marine Corps (1955–1959); United States Marine Corps Reserve (1962–1986)
- Service years: 1955–1959, 1962–1986
- Rank: Colonel

Merle Richard Rose (March 6, 1933 – April 10, 2021) was an American academic. He was the tenth president of Alfred University from 1974 until 1978, when he left to become the seventh president of the Rochester Institute of Technology from 1979 until 1992.

== Early life ==
Merle Richard Rose was born in Fredonia, Pennsylvania on March 6, 1933. Rose earned a bachelor's degree from Slippery Rock University of Pennsylvania in 1955, a master's degree in counseling from Westminster College and a Ph.D. in higher education administration from the University of Pittsburgh.

== Career ==
He served in the United States Marine Corps as a colonel, serving in active duty from 1955 to 1959 and in active reserves from 1962 to 1986. He was also a schoolteacher at the Lakeview School District in Mercer County, Pennsylvania, eventually leaving to become a professor of education and assistant provost at the University of Pittsburgh from 1962 to 1972. He was appointed a Deputy Assistant U.S. Secretary of Defense for Education in 1972. In the same year of 1972, Rose published An Educational Road Map to Human Goal Fulfillment. In 1975, he wrote, Educating the American Military Officer. The System and Its Challenges: An Overview'.'

=== Alfred University ===
Rose became president at Alfred University in 1974, and served until 1978. He came into his tenure at Alfred University with a shrinking applicant pool with the national economy in a recession and inflation threatening private institutions. Edward G. Coll Jr., the twelfth President of Alfred University, described Rose's tenure as bold, in the face of this economic crisis. During this time academic programming was not cut and admissions standards were kept high in order to stay competitive with the nation's leading institutions.

Rose was quoted as saying, "Alfred University has a proud heritage, one not built on size. I do not believe the future of our institution rests in number of students, but rather on quality."

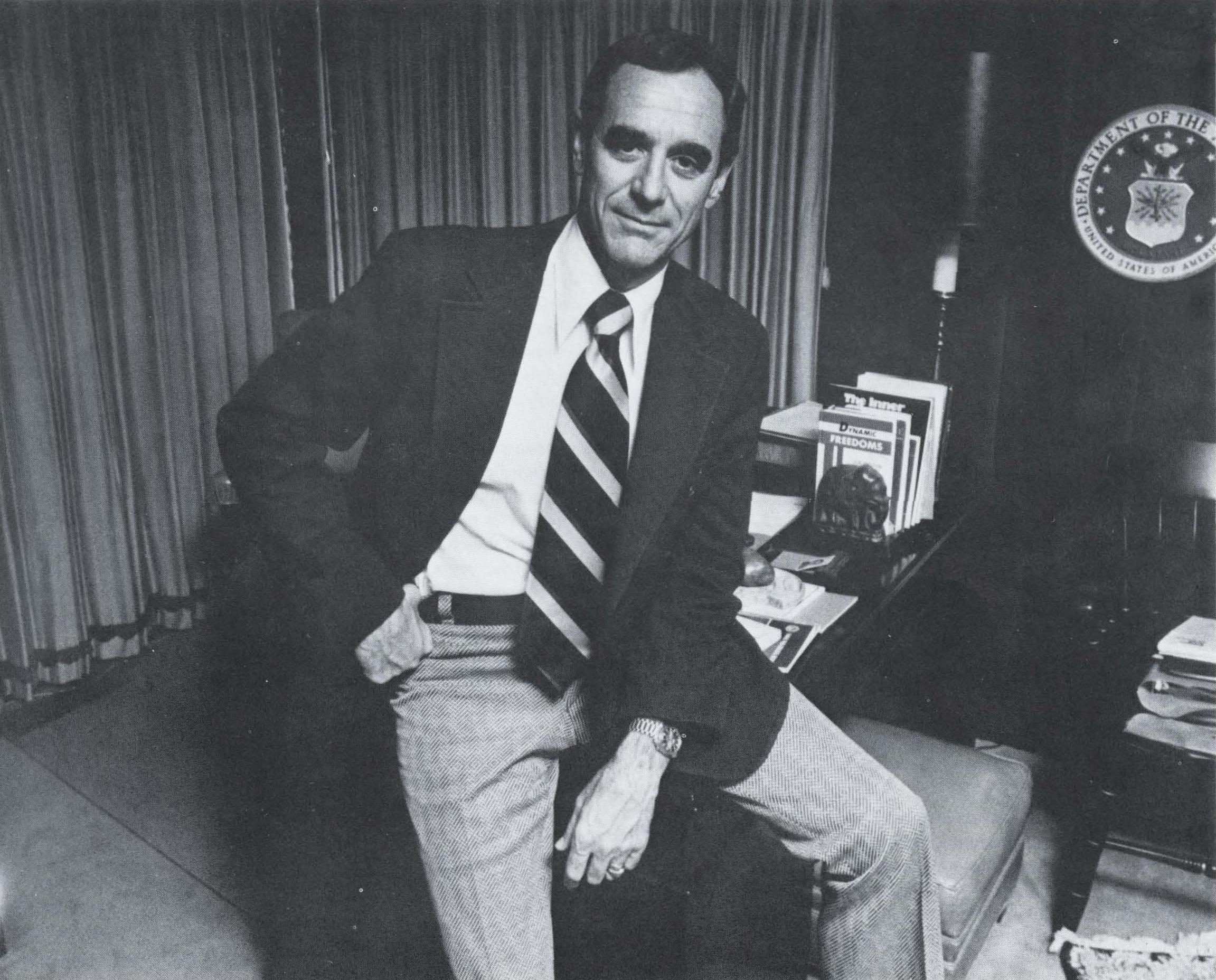
Rose circa 1978

=== Rochester Institute of Technology ===
Rose was the seventh president of the Rochester Institute of Technology from 1979 until 1992. Under Rose's leadership, RIT incorporated Eisenhower College in 1979 and expanded liberal arts and humanities programs. The first PhD program in imaging science was launched during his tenure in 1990. In 1990, RIT paired with the University of Cape Town to offer a joint business management education program for black, Indian and mixed race students, aimed at reducing the racial divide in South Africa under the Government's apartheid policy.

In 1991, Rose touched off a firestorm of controversy by allegedly accepting a covert position working for the Central Intelligence Agency (CIA) at its headquarters in Langley, Virginia, while simultaneously serving as RIT President. The resulting outcry and investigations by the local paper effectively ended his career at RIT, and he resigned, ending his presidency at the close of the 1991–1992 school year.

In 1998, Rose was inducted into the RIT Athletic Hall of Fame. He is honored for his distinguished service to the university. His dedication describes: "With Rose’s encouragement in the 1980’s, RIT intercollegiate athletics steadily gained national prominence.... RIT virtually transformed its athletics program from one that seldom saw national championship play to one where NCAA appearances became commonplace in such sports as hockey, soccer, lacrosse, basketball, volleyball, wrestling, cross country and swimming."

=== Later career ===
Rose was a Trustee Emeriti at Roberts Wesleyan College, a private Christian liberal arts college in New York state. He was also a trustee of the U.S. Air Force University.

== Personal life ==
He was married to Clarice Ratzlaff for 65 years. Together, they had three sons: Scott, Eric, and Craig.

== Death ==
Rose died on April 10, 2021, at his home in Brooksville, Florida.

Academic offices
Preceded by Leland W. Miles	President of Alfred University; 1974–1978	Succeeded by S. Gene Odle
Preceded by Paul A. Miller	President of the Rochester Institute of Technology; January 1, 1979 – June 1, 1992	Succeeded by Thomas R. Plough (acting)
