= Carleton B. Gibson =

American academic

Carleton Bartlett Gibson
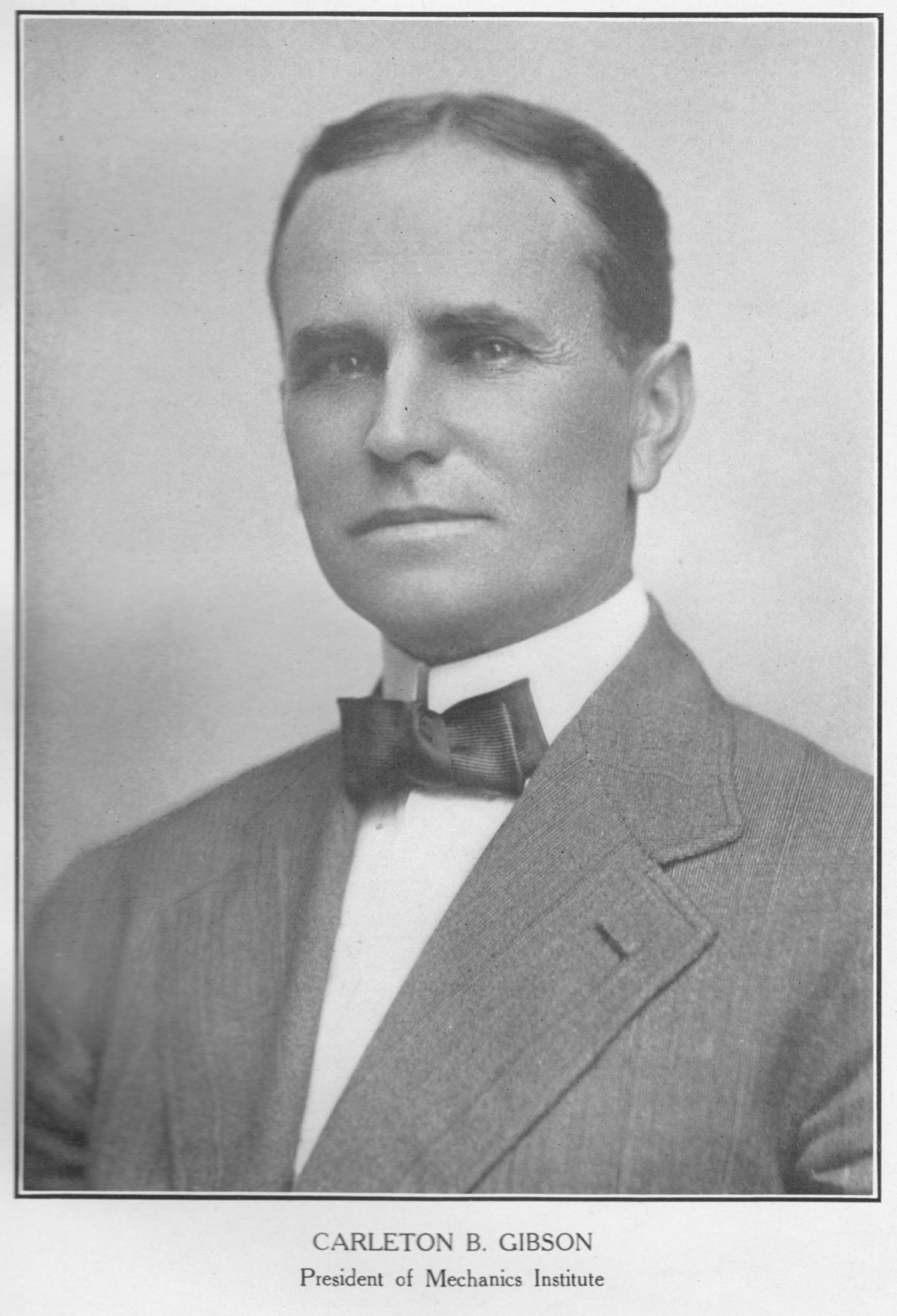

1st President of the Rochester Athenæum and Mechanics Institute
- In office June 1910 – July 1, 1916
- Succeeded by: James F. Barker

3nd President of the Jacksonville State University
- In office 1886–1892
- Preceded by: J. Harris Chappell
- Succeeded by: J. B. Jarrett

Personal details
- Born: September 18, 1863 Mobile, Alabama, U.S.
- Died: May 22, 1927 (aged 63) Norfolk, Virginia
- Resting place: Bonaventure Cemetery
- Spouse: Martha Goodwin
- Children: Carleton Bartlett Gibson, Jr. Gladys Newcomb Gibson Lindsay; William Wallace Gibson
- Parent: James Spaulding Gibson; Antoinette Julia Powers
- Education: University of Alabama
- Profession: Administrator

Carleton Bartlett Gibson (September 18, 1863 – May 22, 1927) was a 19th– and 20th-century American industrial educator and university president. He notably served as the third president of Jacksonville State Normal School from 1886 until 1892; followed by serving as the first president of the Rochester Athenæum and Mechanics Institute from 1910 until 1916.

== Early life and education ==
He was born in Mobile, Alabama in the year before the Battle of Mobile Bay. His father was a Scotsman and his mother was a New Yorker. As a child, he attended school at the Barton Academy and the Mobile Military Academy. He graduated from the University of Alabama with bachelor's and master's degrees in the Classics in 1884 and 1885, respectively and married the former Martha "Mattie" Goodwin Newcomb in 1889. While still in college he became principal of the public school in Mulberry, Alabama.

== Career ==
After graduation, he took a job as the 3rd President at the Jacksonville State Normal School (now Jacksonville State University), serving from 1886 until 1892. He also helped establish the University Military School of Alabama starting in 1892. He briefly served as president of the Alabama Central Female College in Tuscaloosa in 1893.

Also in 1893, he left to become the principal of the Columbus, Georgia High School and within the year became Superintendent of the Columbus City Schools. With the financial support of George Foster Peabody, he established the first school for industrial education in the South, the Primary Industrial School of Columbus in 1900. The school introduced the children of mill workers to two dozen different handicrafts that would prove useful for their later employ in the local textile factories.

Gibson was hired to oversee the Rochester Athenæum and Mechanics Institute (now Rochester Institute of Technology) in June 1910 by the then board of directors which included George Eastman. He instituted the Institute's Cooperative education program in 1912, as part of his focus on industrial education. The program required students to study half time and to work half time in shops at Eastman Kodak, Gleason Works, and the German American Button Company.

Gibson took a leave of absence from the Institute in 1914, joining Herbert Hoover's American Commission for War Relief in Belgium with tours of duty in Belgium, France, and Russian Poland. He eventually resigned the Institute Presidency to pursue that undertaking full-time in June 1915. The Institute did not recognize his resignation for a full year while it sought another president. Upon America's entry into the War, he organized divisional schools for the Army and served as director of Vocational Training for the American Expeditionary Force in France.

After the end of the War, Gibson was elected Superintendent of the Savannah, Georgia public school system. In 1926, he left education to become a vice president at the Florida Title Insurance Company in Miami. He died suddenly in Norfolk, Virginia in 1927.

After his death his wife delivered lectures on international affairs before succumbing to pneumonia.

Academic offices
| Preceded by Sumner B. Foster | President Alabama Central Female College; 1893 | Vacant Title next held by Edmond H. Murfee; Benjamin F. Giles |
| Preceded by (Board of Directors) | President of the Rochester Athenæum and Mechanics Institute; June, 1910 – July 1, 1916 | Succeeded by James F. Barker |
