= Central High School (Fargo, North Dakota) =

Location
- 1010 2nd Ave. S. Fargo, North Dakota; United States
- Coordinates: 46°52′20″N 96°47′42″W

Information
- Established: 1882

Central High School, of Fargo, North Dakota, was the first public high school in Fargo. The Cass County Annex is currently on the site.

== History ==
External images
- North Dakota State University wordmark via North Dakota State University
- Fargo High School, 1882-1916
- Fargo Central High School, 1921-1966

Fargo High School and Grade School was a three-story structure built in 1882 at a cost of $40,000. The school had 21 rooms, and it housed all grades from 1 to 12 and had six teachers for the high school, and ten for the lower grades. The first graduating class in 1866 had five students, and in 1908 they had 51 graduates. The high school underwent an expansion in 1900, and sixteen years later, it was destroyed by fire. In 1921, a replacement, Fargo Central High School was built on the same site, and it too succumbed to fire on April 19, 1966.
