= Royal B. Farnum =

American academic (1884–1967)

Royal Bailey Farnum
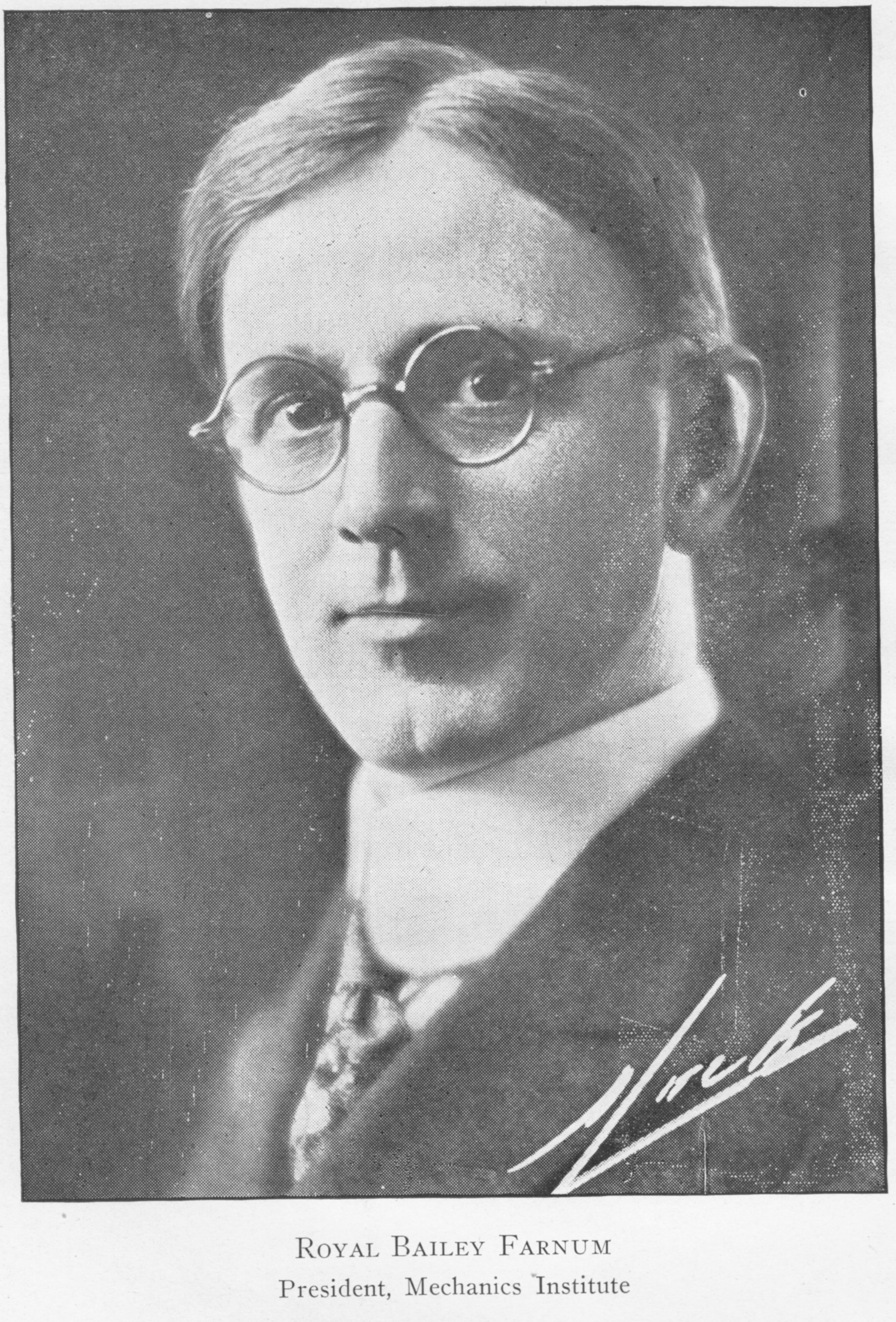

3rd President of the Rochester Athenæum and Mechanics Institute
- In office 1919–1921
- Preceded by: James F. Barker
- Succeeded by: John A. Randall

Personal details
- Born: June 11, 1884 Somerville, Massachusetts, US
- Died: August 28, 1967 (aged 83) Plainfield, Connecticut, US
- Spouse: Adeline Burnett
- Parent: Daniel Stoddard Farnum; Flora L. Bailey
- Education: Massachusetts Normal Art School
- Profession: Administrator

Royal Bailey Farnum (11 June 1884 – 28 August 1967) was an American art educator who served in administrative roles in various public and private educational institutions in Massachusetts, New York, Ohio, and Rhode Island during the first half of the 20th century.

== Early life and career ==
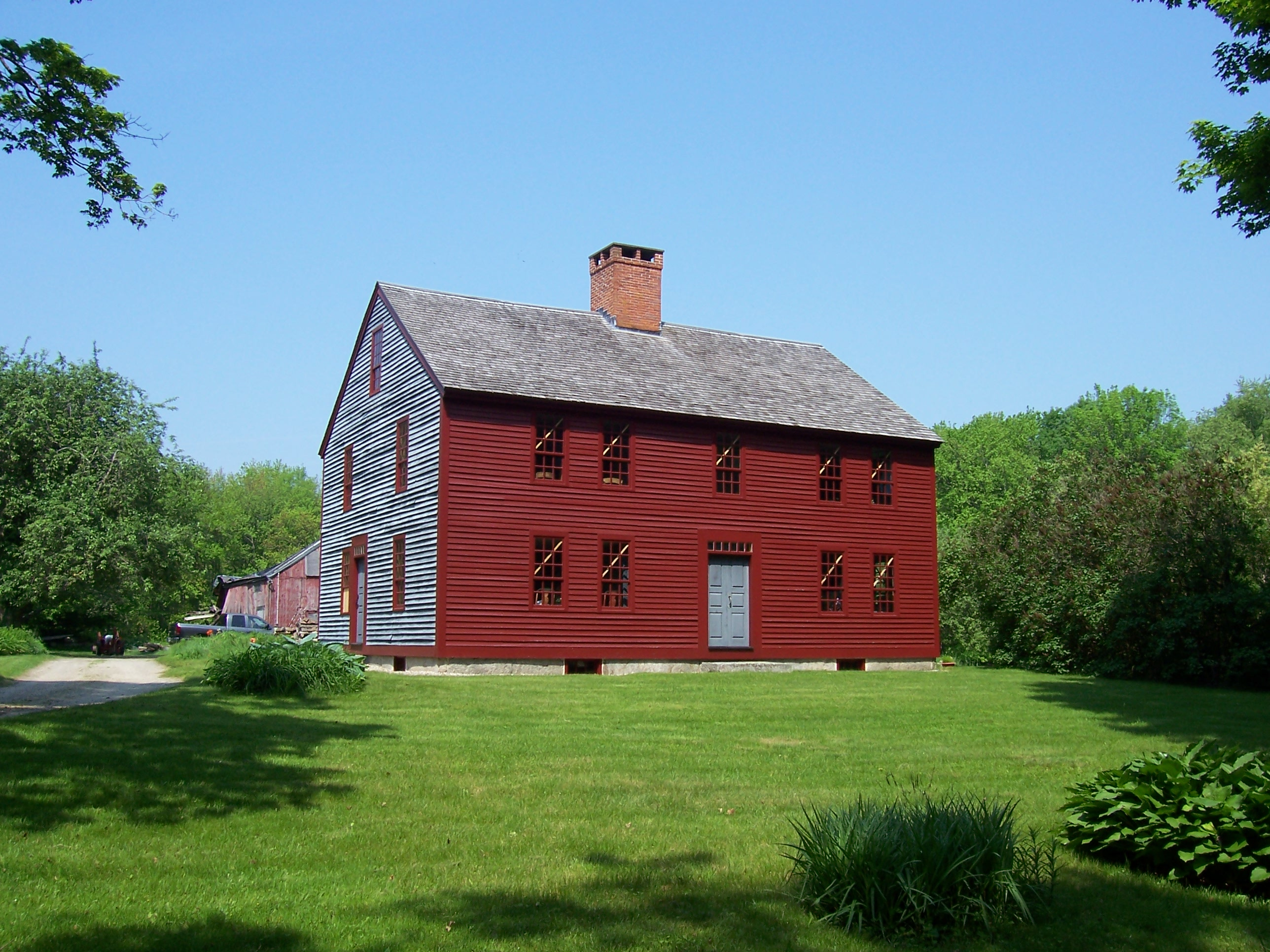
Fearnhame, Farnum's vacation and later retirement home in Hampton, Connecticut

He was born in Somerville, Massachusetts to Daniel Stoddard Farnum and Flora L. Bailey. He married the former Adeline Burnett on 19 December 1907 and raised three children.

He graduated from the Massachusetts Normal Art School in 1906 and took a job as the Director of the Normal Department of the Cleveland School of Art, while simultaneously teaching art in the Cleveland Public School District. In 1909, he became the Director of Art Education for the State of New York.

Farnum was initially hired to be the Superintendent of the Department of Applied Arts at the Rochester Athenæum and Mechanics Institute in 1918, but rose to the presidency the next year, serving until 1921. Farnum, faced with state-mandated raises for secondary school teachers and enrollment swollen with veterans of World War I, embarked on a fund-raising campaign to boost the compensation of the Institute's faculty. He also considered proposals to merge with the University of Rochester or to take over the University's old buildings as it moved to its River Campus, ideas that were opposed by both George Eastman and Carl Lomb.

Farnum also served on the Memorial Art Gallery Board of Managers from 1920 to 1924.

In 1921, he returned to the Massachusetts Normal Art School to serve as its Principal and as Director of Art Education for the state of Massachusetts.

== Rhode Island School of Design ==
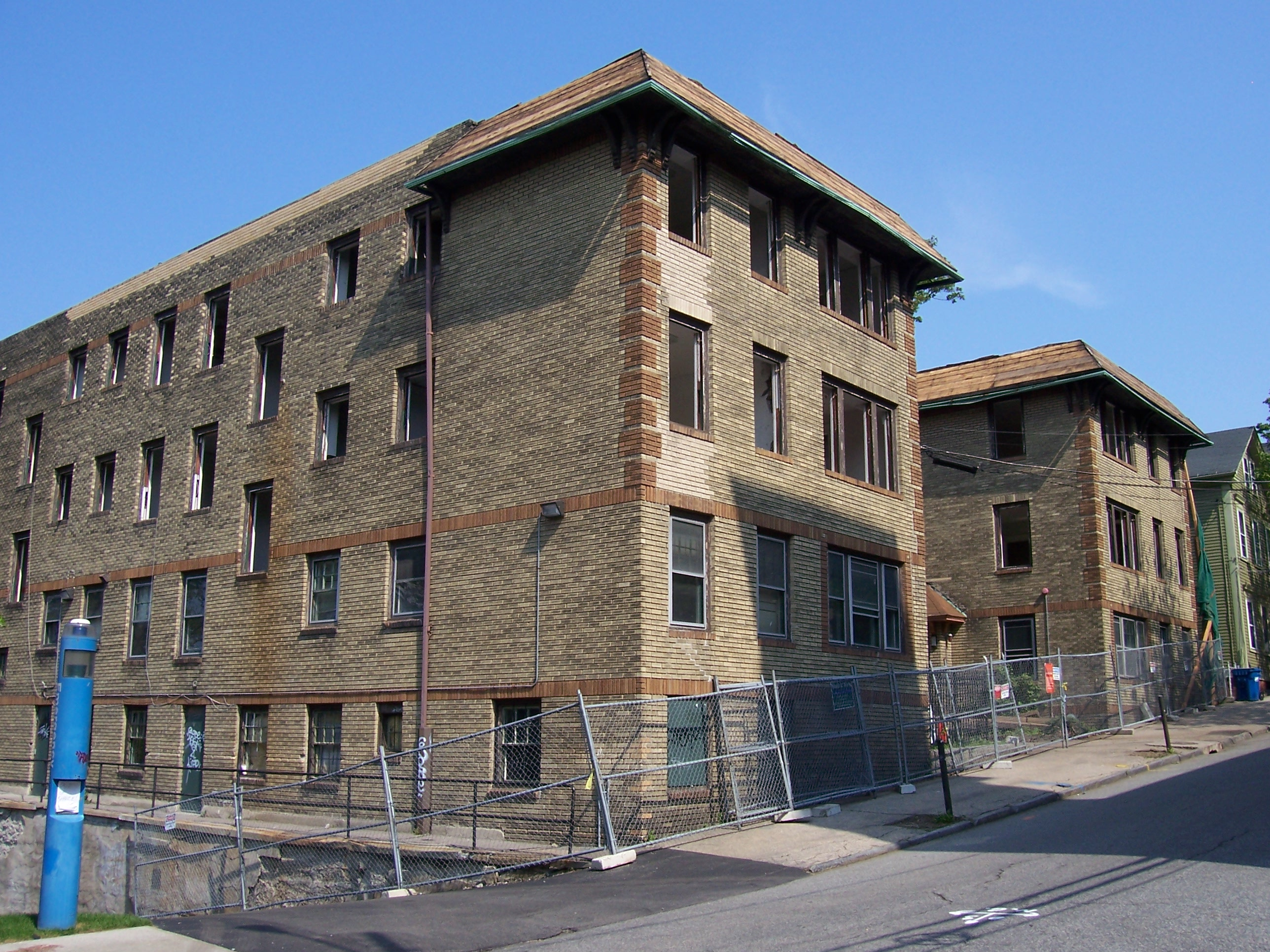
Farnum Residence Hall on Congdon Street, Providence, Rhode Island

In 1929, he took a job as Educational Director for the Rhode Island School of Design and was subsequently promoted to Executive Vice President in 1937.

He served as president of the National Association for Art Education from 1936–1938, the National Association of Schools of Design from 1925–1936, and the Federal Council on Art Education from 1925–1936.

During World War II, he helped the war effort by assisting in the development of color schemes for optimal camouflage.

Farnum was bestowed with an honorary Art D. from Brown University in 1935 and received the Michael Friedsam Medal in 1942. RISD's Farnum Hall is named after him. He retired from RISD in 1946 and died in Plainfield, Connecticut in 1967.

== Selected works ==
- Farnum, Royal (1914), Present status of drawing and art in the elementary and secondary schools of the United States, Washington, D.C.: G.P.O., OCLC 1399567.
- Farnum, Royal (1916), The manual arts in New York State, Albany, New York: University of the State of New York, OCLC 26408179.
- Farnum, Royal (1948), Learning more about pictures, with reference text on selected works of art, Westport, Connecticut: Artext Prints, OCLC 1438662.

Academic offices
Preceded by James F. Barker	President of the Rochester Athenæum and Mechanics Institute; 1919–1921	Succeeded by John A. Randall
