= Kenneth Mortimer =

American scholar and university administrator

Kenneth P. Mortimer

11th President of Western Washington University
- In office 1988–1993
- Preceded by: G. Robert Ross
- Succeeded by: Karen Morse

President of the University of Hawaii
- In office 1993–2001

Personal details
- Born: c. 1937
- Spouse: Lorraine "Lorrie" Mortimer (1938-2005)
- Profession: University administrator
- Salary: $90,500
- Website: Website of the WWU Presidency

Kenneth P. Mortimer is a scholar who was president of Western Washington University from 1988 to 1993, and the eleventh president of the University of Hawaiʻi system and chancellor of the University of Hawaiʻi at Manoa from 1993 to 2001. He received a Bachelor of Arts and Master of Business Administration from the University of Pennsylvania and a PhD from the University of California at Berkeley. He previously worked for Pennsylvania State University. He is a well-known scholar in the area of educational administration. Currently he is engaged in writing, consulting, and serving on boards. He is the author of several books including The Art and Politics of Academic Governance: Relations among Boards, Presidents, and Faculty.
