= Joseph A. Chapman =

American academic and biologist

13th President of North Dakota State University
- In office June 1999 – November 30, 2009
- Preceded by: Thomas R. Plough
- Succeeded by: Dean L. Bresciani

Personal details
- Born: 1942 (age 83–84)
- Spouse: Gale Chapman
- Children: 2
- Education: Oregon State University
- Occupation: Biologist, Academic

Joseph A. Chapman (born 1942) is an American academic and biologist who served as the 13th President of North Dakota State University, which is located in Fargo, from 1999 to 2009.

== Biography ==
He is a graduate of Oregon State University in Corvallis, Oregon, where he received his bachelor's, master's and doctorate degree. Joseph Chapman is married to Gale Chapman and they have two daughters, Valerie and Jennifer.

== Tenure at NDSU ==
Enrollment at NDSU rose from around 9,600 students to nearly 14,200 during his tenure. NDSU’s doctoral programs increased in size from 18 to 44, and the total annual research expenditures rose from $44 million to $115.5 million. Chapman also led NDSU to join the NCAA Division I athletics program where during their first year of eligibility they sent seven teams to post-season play. In that same address, several of the building projects during his tenures also included: Renaissance Hall, Klai Hall, Criminal Justice building, Graduate Center, Bentson/Bunker Fieldhouse, Equine Science Center, three buildings in the Research and Technology Park, new residence halls, Memorial Union, Wallman Wellness Center, Sudro Hall, Beef Center of Excellence, the Arboretum, Animal Physiology and Nutrition Center, and Minard Hall. President Chapman also noted that the estimated economic impact of the University to the State of North Dakota was $3.15 billion.

== Controversies ==
On October 14, 2009 Chapman announced his resignation from NDSU. He stated, "Controversies in recent days have created distractions that have made it impossible for me to provide the leadership this institution deserves". Among those controversies is Chapman's $22,000 trip to Washington, DC for President Barack Obama's inauguration in January 2009 and a construction project on a new home for the NDSU President that is more than $1 million over budget. His resignation was to become official on January 2, 2010, but the North Dakota Board of Higher Education chose interim President Richard Hanson to take over effective December 1, 2009. Chapman's last day at NDSU was November 30, 2009.

== Awards ==
- 2006 North Dakota Chamber of Commerce Greater North Dakotan Award
- 2005 President’s Award, National Association of Student Personnel Administration

Preceded by Thomas R. Plough	President of North Dakota State University; 1999–2009	Succeeded by Dean L. Bresciani
