= French Canadian (disambiguation) =

French Canadians are an ethnic group comprising people descended from the French settlers of Canada during the times of New France.

French Canadian may also refer to:

- Anyone who speaks the French language in Canada, regardless of descent or native language
- Francophone Canadians, Canadians with French as their native language, regardless of descent
- Canada, a New France colony in present-day Canada that developed into Quebec
- Habitants, the inhabitants of New France Canada
- French Canadian Americans, French Canadians in the United States

== See also ==
- Canadian French, Canadian dialects of French
