= University of Kansas Edwards Campus =

University satellite campus

- Type: Public satellite campus
- Established: 1993
- Parent institution: University of Kansas
- Location: Overland Park, Kansas, United States; 38°53′58″N 94°43′33″W
- Colors: Crimson and blue
- Website: edwardscampus.ku.edu

The University of Kansas Edwards Campus, also known as the KU Edwards Campus, is a satellite campus of the University of Kansas. The campus is located in Overland Park in the Kansas City metropolitan area; its four buildings are located on a 34.8 acres (14.1 ha) site at 127th Street and Quivira Road.

The University of Kansas opened its Edwards Campus in December 1992. As of 2021, more than 2,500 students were enrolled at the campus.

== History ==
On December 3, 1992, the University of Kansas dedicated the first building on the Edwards Campus, the "Regents Center".

In November 2008, Johnson County voters approved a local sales tax to fund a partnership between the University of Kansas and Kansas State University in constructing the Johnson County Education Research Triangle (JCERT). The tax enabled the KU Edwards Campus to build the BEST Building.

On December 16, 2011, Aisha Khan, a then-19-year-old student at nearby Johnson County Community College, called her sister from KU Edwards and said that she was running from a drunken stranger who had harassed her while she was outdoors studying. Police at Overland Park, Kansas treat the case as an abduction. On the night of December 21, 2011, the Overland Police Department informed Khan's family that she had been found safe and not held against her will.

In June 2020, during the COVID-19 pandemic in Kansas, the University of Kansas announced that it would hold in-person classes at the Edwards Campus from August 24 as regularly scheduled, with a modified schedule lacking a Labor Day holiday, fall break, or spring break.

In August 2020, KU reported that, out of an initial batch of 7088 test results received ahead of the 2020–2021 school year, 89 people tested positive (all but two of them being students). There are specific testing instructions for people at the KU Edwards Campus.

As of 2021, more than 2,500 students were enrolled at the campus.

== Student statistics ==
KU Edwards Campus provides educational programming designed to help students complete degrees, change or advance their career and continue their education. Based on fall semester 2019 enrollment, the ages of KUEC students were:

Age group		
18 or younger	0%	1
19-24	28%	410
25-29	26%	381
30-39	27%	385
40-49	13%	192
50-59	5%	72
Other	0%	0

Based on a spring 2017 student survey and summer 2018 alumni survey.

- Male - 45% Female - 55%
- Have children under age 18 - more than 33%
- Work full-time - 37%
- Work part-time - 25%
- First in family to attend college - 23%
- Part-time students (less than 12 credit hours/semester) - 71%

Reason for continuing their education, according to a pre-enrollment survey:

- Starting a Career 32%
- Career Advancement 27%
- Career Change 20%
- Personal Fulfillment 16%
- Other 8 5%
- Tradition Setting for Future Generations .5%

== Academic profile ==
The KU Edwards Campus offers an undergraduate degree completion and graduate programs. U.S. News & World Report recognizes KU's public administration, overall education and special education.

== Johnson County Education Research Triangle sales tax ==
In November 2008, Johnson County voters approved a local sales tax to fund a partnership between the University of Kansas and Kansas State University. The Johnson County Education Research Triangle (JCERT) is formed by KUEC, KU Medical Center and K-State-Olathe. The Triangle sales tax enabled the KU Edwards Campus to build the 75,000-square-foot (7,000 m^{2}) BEST Building, which allowed the Campus to grow by 1,000 students and launch 10 new academic programs. By 2019, the Johnson County Education Research Triangle supports 27 degrees and certificate programs at KUEC, which grew 15 percent in the 2018–19 school year.

== KU Professional & Continuing Education ==
KU Professional & Continuing Education (abbreviated KUPCE) is a program located at the KU Edwards Campus.
