= Mark W. Ellingson =

American academic (1905–1993)

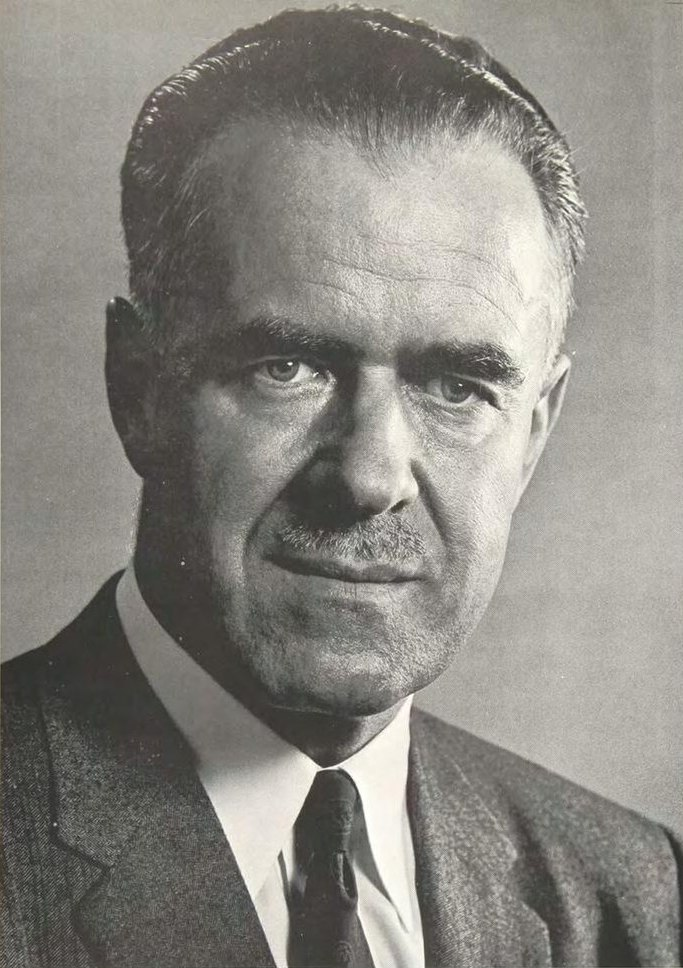
- Ellingson c. 1966

5th President of the Rochester Institute of Technology
- In office 1936–1969
- Preceded by: John A. Randall
- Succeeded by: Paul A. Miller

Personal details
- Born: June 5, 1904 Magrath, Alberta
- Died: February 12, 1993 (aged 88) Rochester, New York
- Spouse: Marcia Cooke Randall
- Children: 4
- Education: Gooding College; University of Rochester; Ohio State University
- Profession: Administrator

Mark Ellingson (1905 – 1993) was the 5th president of the Rochester Institute of Technology, succeeding John A. Randall, from 1936 to 1969. He rose from a teacher at the institute to the presidency, which he held for longer than anyone before or since, and in many ways he brought the institute into its modern form. During Ellingson's tenure in office from 1936 to 1969, enrollment in day and evening classes rose from 2,250 to 16,000. He also oversaw a major expansion of the RIT endowment; a 1937 merger with the Empire School of Printing; the 1944 renaming to "Rochester Institute of Technology" (formerly, Rochester Athenaeum and Mechanics Institute); the planning, construction, and 1968 transfer to the current campus in Henrietta. He also spearheaded the drive to have RIT selected as the location for the National Technical Institute for the Deaf, which admitted its first students in 1968.

The tallest building on the Henrietta campus, a residence hall nicknamed "Tower A", is named for Ellingson.

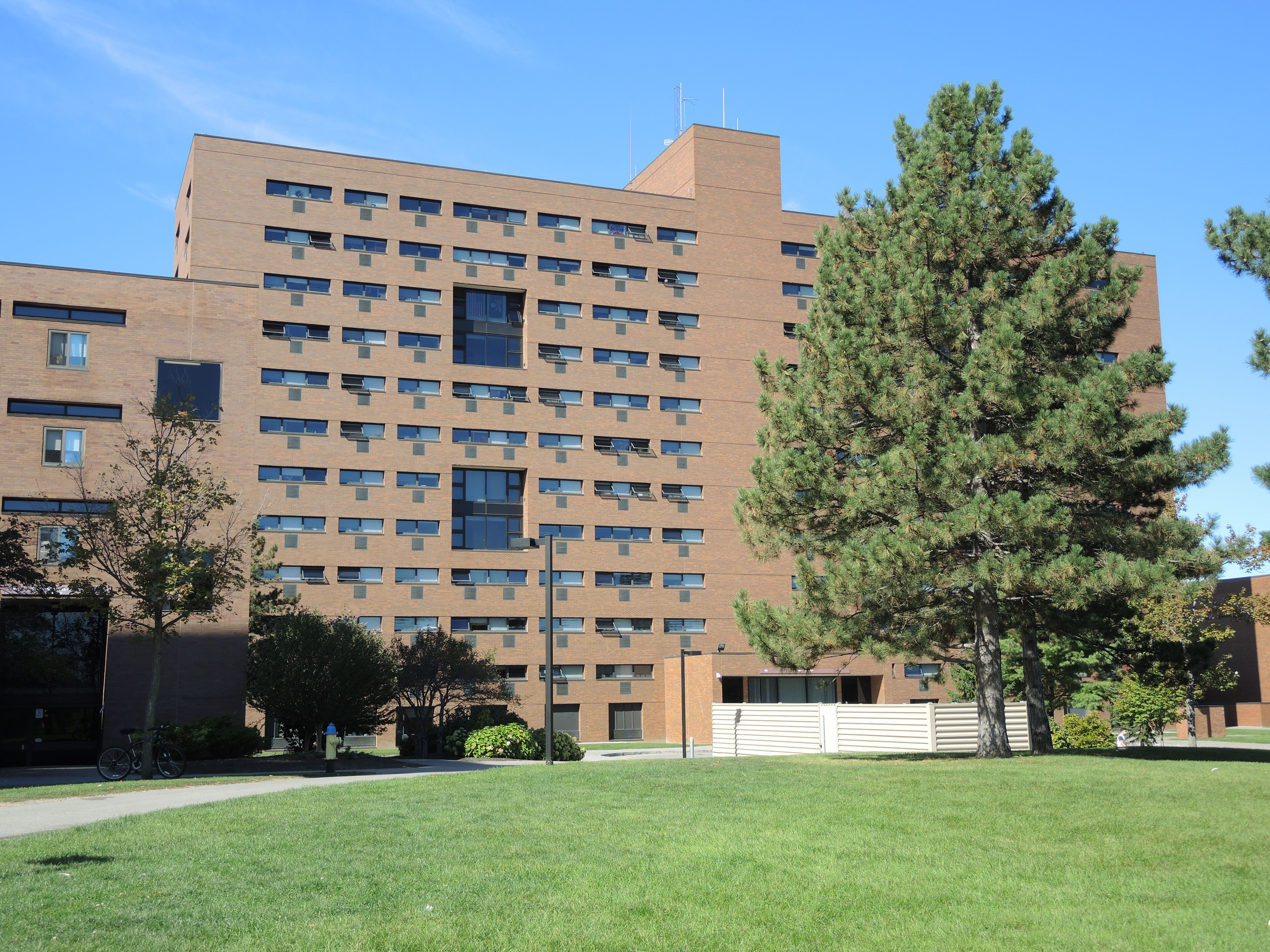
East face of Ellingson Hall

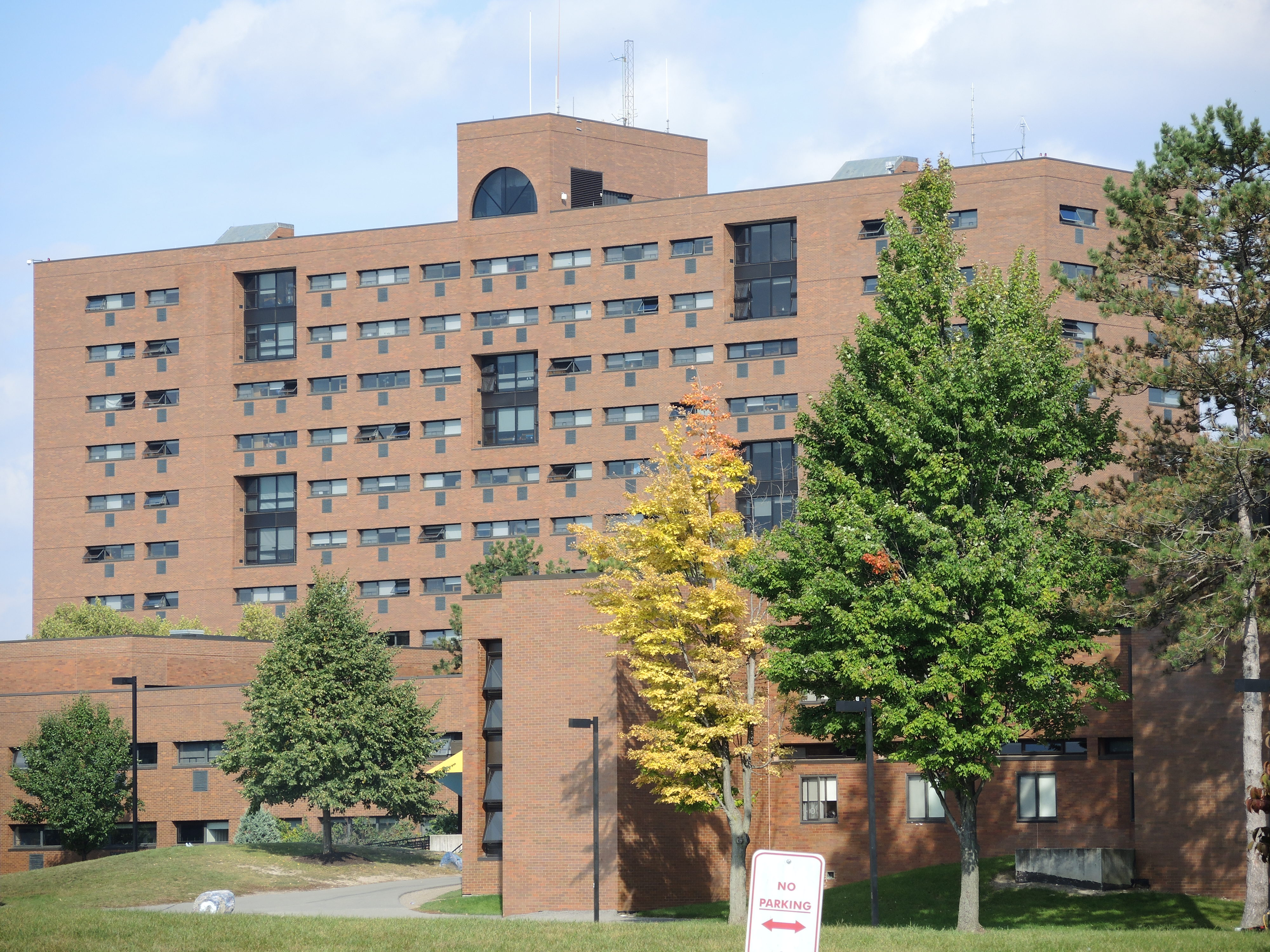
West face of Ellingson Hall

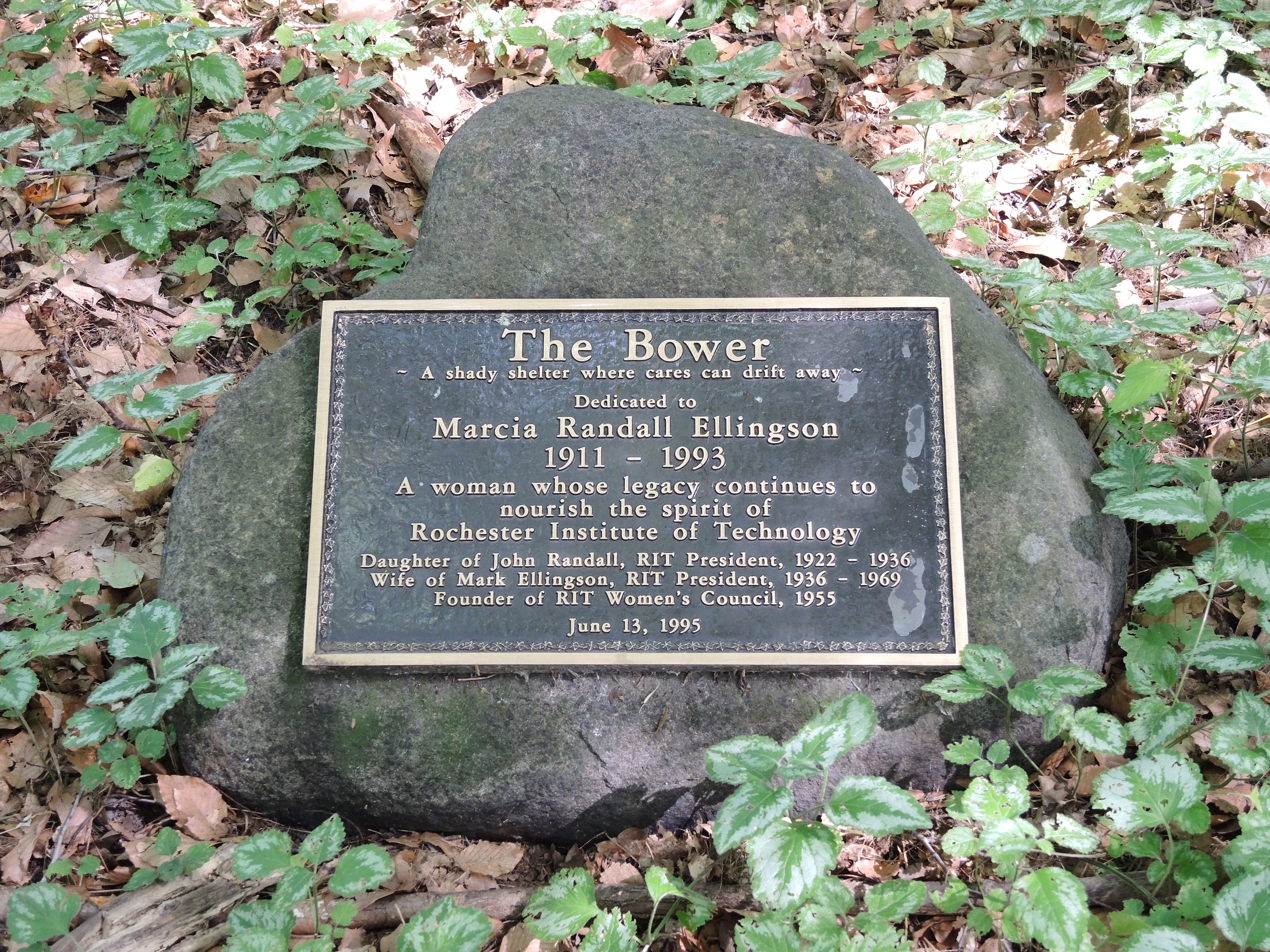
Marcia Ellingson memorial

Academic offices
Preceded by John A. Randall	President of the Rochester Athenæum and Mechanics Institute; 1936–1944	Name change
New title	President of the Rochester Institute of Technology; 1944 – September 30, 1969	Succeeded by Paul A. Miller
