= James Francis Barker =

American artist

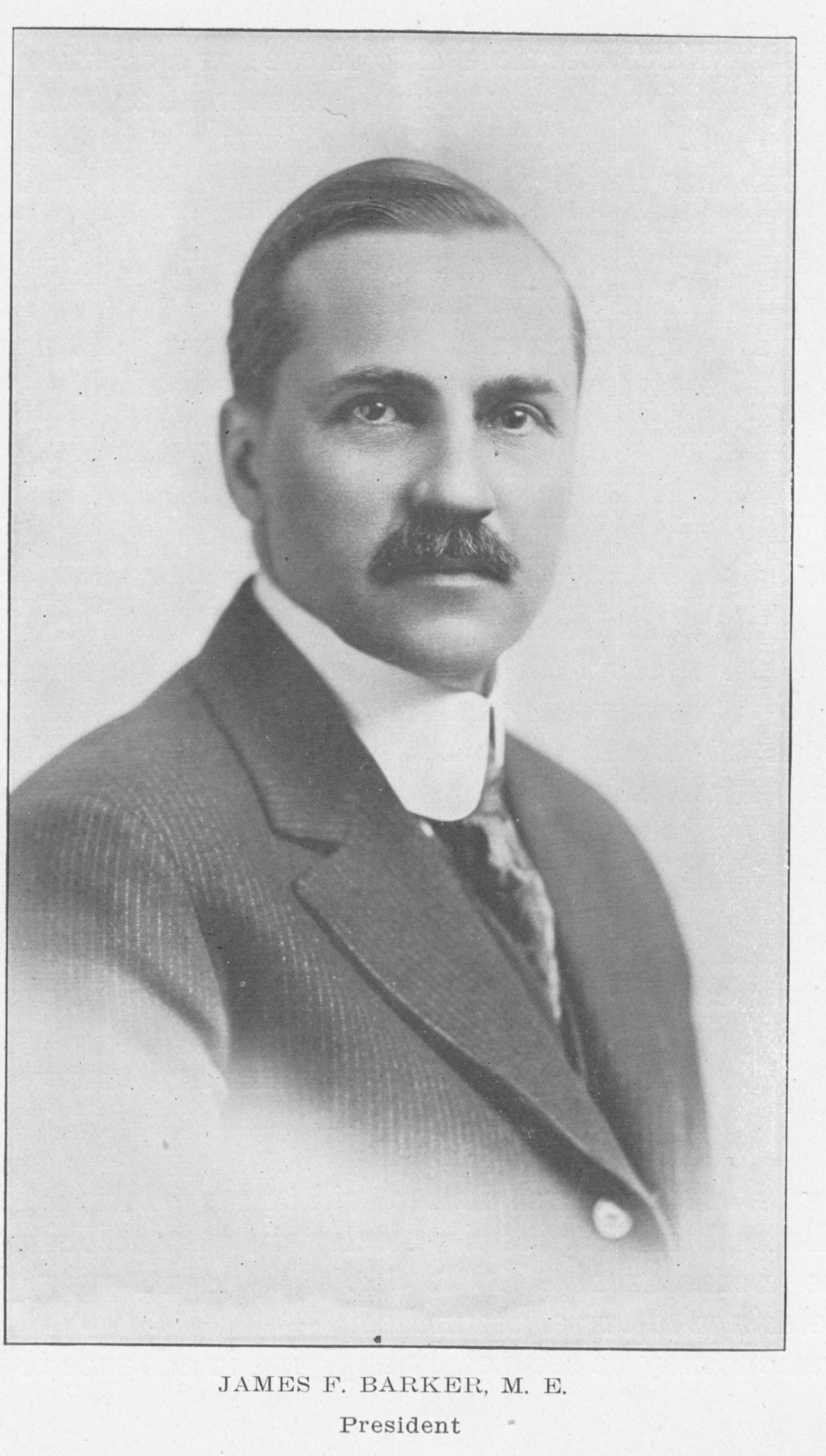

2nd President of the Rochester Athenæum and Mechanics Institute
- In office July 1, 1916 – 1919
- Preceded by: Carleton B. Gibson
- Succeeded by: Royal B. Farnum

Personal details
- Born: 1872 Keokuk, Iowa, US
- Died: December 10, 1950 (aged 77–78) Rochester, New York, US
- Resting place: Prospect Hill Cemetery, Nantucket, Massachusetts
- Spouse: Katharine Spooner; Florence Mary Edmonds
- Children: Josephine Barker Cooper
- Parent(s): James Hussey Barker, Jr. Maria Josefina Sarresqueta
- Education: Cornell University
- Profession: Administrator

James Francis Barker (1872 – 10 December 1950) was the second president of the Rochester Athenæum and Mechanics Institute, succeeding Carleton B. Gibson, from 1916–1919.

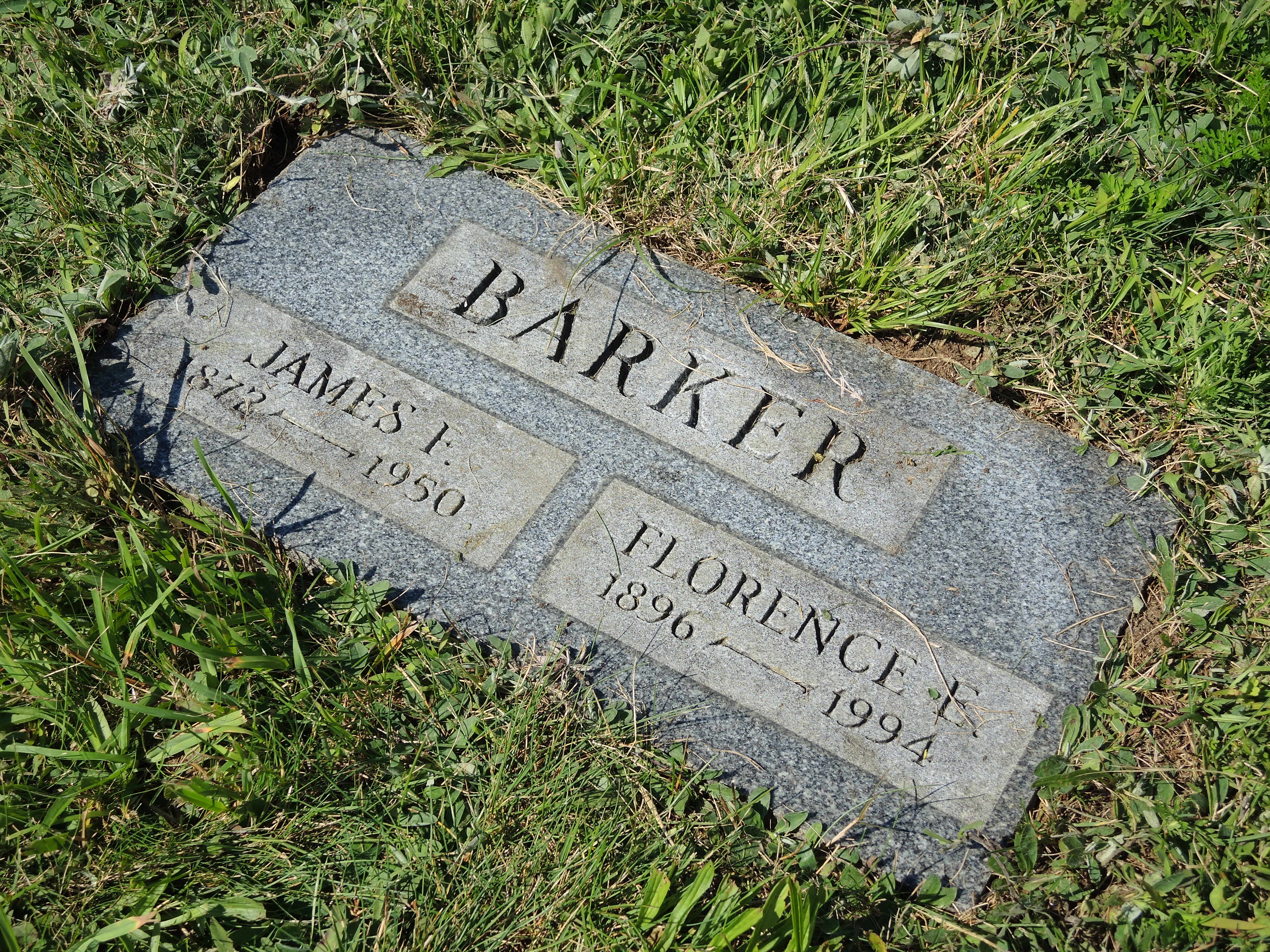
Gravestone in Prospect Hill Cemetery, Nantucket

He was born in 1872 in Keokuk, Iowa, the son of a railroad ticketing agent and a New Orleanian of Spanish and French extraction. His ancestors on his father's side included 11 of the 15 families who settled Nantucket in 1659. He graduated from Cornell University in 1893 with a degree in Mechanical Engineering and spent another year studying Architecture at the graduate level. He briefly worked at D. H. Burnham & Company and Allis-Chalmers Manufacturing Co. before switching to education, becoming Superintendent of the Manual Training Department at East Division High School in Milwaukee, Wisconsin in 1897. He left in 1904 to pursue similar positions at Grand Rapids High School and the Hackley School in Muskegon, Michigan. In 1906, he participated in the formation of East Technical High School in Cleveland, Ohio and served as its first principal.

He married the former Kate Spooner in 1897 and raised one daughter. After being widowed in the late 1930s, he married Josephine M. Edmonds, a home economics teacher and half sister of International House of New York founder Harry Edmonds, in 1941.

He came to the Rochester Athenæum and Mechanics Institute after his predecessor resigned to continue his work in the war relief effort. He oversaw the Institute during World War I, but subsequently left to become Superintendent of Junior and Technical Education in the Rochester City School District. He also served as general supervisor of evening, summer, and continuation programs for the District.

After he retired in 1936, he operated a photographic studio called "The Eagle's Wing" on Nantucket Island during the summer months. He named the studio after an island steamboat his grandfather had commanded on Nantucket Sound. He also pursued painting, pottery, metal working, and cabinet making.

He died in his Rochester home at the age of 78 and is interred on Nantucket.

Academic offices
Preceded by Carleton B. Gibson	President of the Rochester Athenæum and Mechanics Institute; July 1, 1916–1919	Succeeded by Royal B. Farnum
