= John A. Randall =

American University president

John Arthur Randall
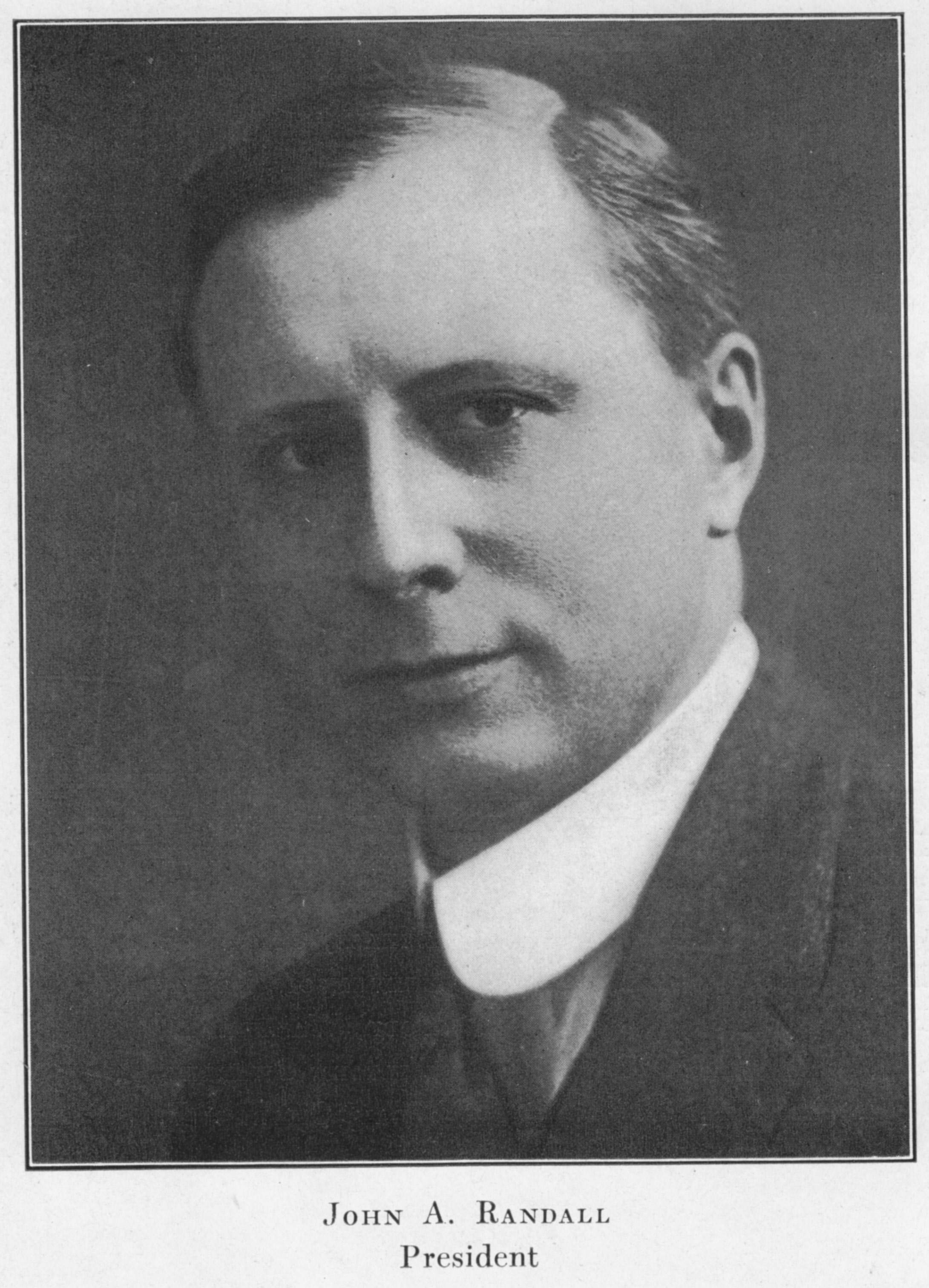

4th President of the Rochester Athenæum and Mechanics Institute
- In office 1922–1936
- Preceded by: Royal B. Farnum
- Succeeded by: Mark W. Ellingson

Personal details
- Born: July 25, 1881 Durham, Maine, US
- Died: June 9, 1968 (aged 86) Boonsboro, Maryland, US
- Resting place: Sweeney Cemetery, North Tonawanda, New York
- Spouse: Georgiana W. Hathaway
- Parent: Greenfield A. Randall; Julia D. Penley
- Education: Wesleyan University
- Profession: Administrator

John Arthur Randall (July 25, 1881 – June 9, 1968) was the fourth President of the Rochester Institute of Technology, succeeding Royal B. Farnum, from 1922 to 1936.

Randall was born in Durham, Maine in 1881 and graduated from Wesleyan University, Phi Beta Kappa.

Randall began his career in education at the Cheltenham Military School. He served as the head of the Physics department at the Pratt Institute from 1913 to 1917.

During World War I, Randall served as Under Secretary of War (1918) to Secretary of War Newton D. Baker in the administration of President Woodrow Wilson. He also served in the War Plans Division of the United States Department of War. He and Dr. C.R. Mann developed the Army Alpha Intelligence Test, thought to be the first attempt of its kind to measure vocational and numerical ability. In 1932, he was commissioned as Colonel in the Special Reserves, assigned to the U.S. Army General Staff.

From 1932 to 1936, he served as a special consultant to the Senate Committee investigating crime and racketeering. He also served as President of the Science Department of the National Education Association.

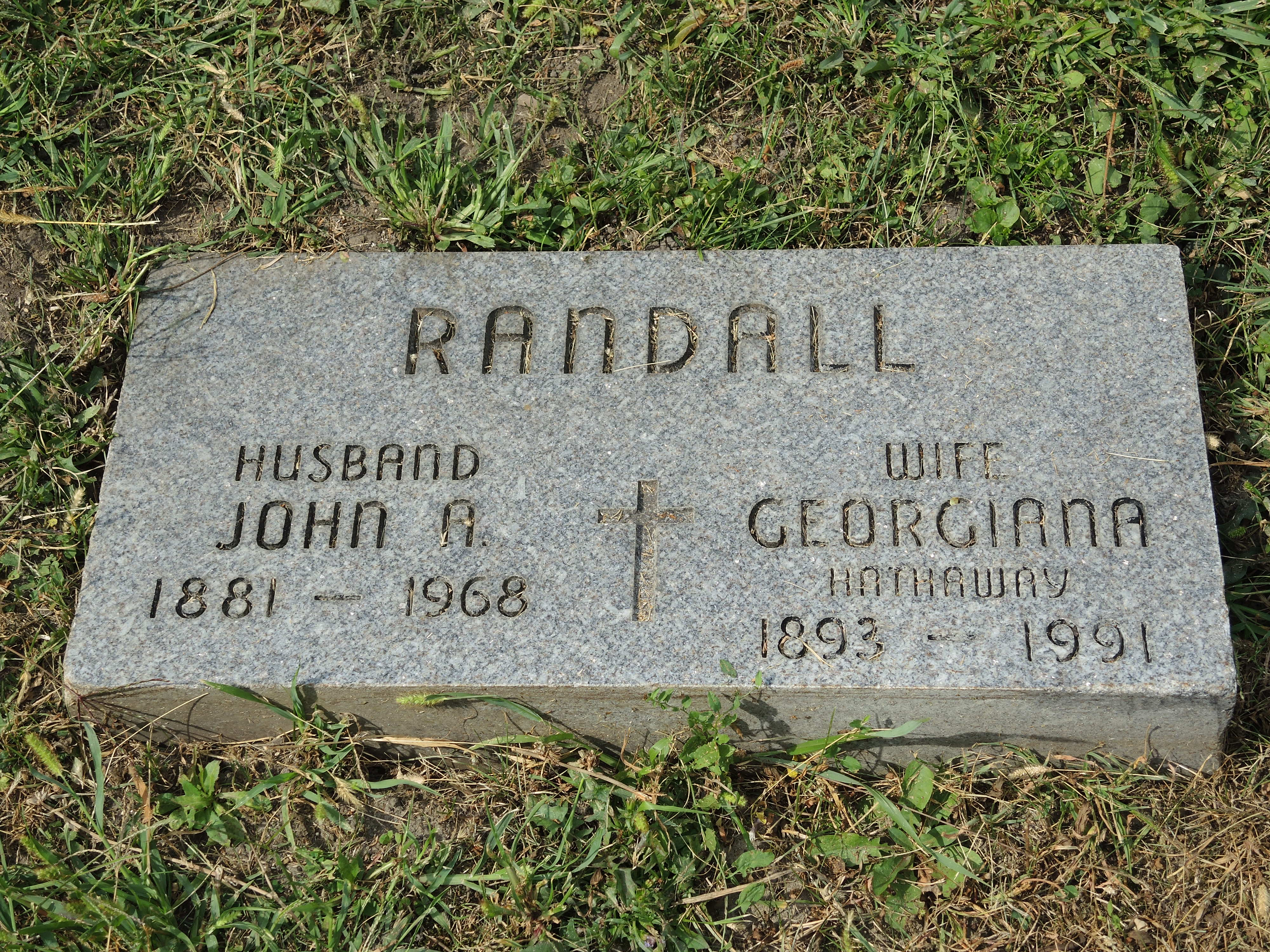
Gravestone in Sweeney Rural Cemetery in North Tonawanda, New York

Randall was instrumental in introducing the method of "case study" to RIT, in further developing the co-op program at RIT, and in the decision that RIT would not grant degrees and would instead provide "short, intensive courses". In 1936, he left RIT to direct the Division of Educational Aids of the National Youth Administration.

He held memberships in many professional societies during his lifetime, including:

- the Society for the Promotion of Engineering Education
- the American Association for the Advancement of Science
- the American Society of Mechanical Engineers
- the American Management Association

He married the former Georgiana Waldron Hathaway in 1936. His daughter, Marcia, married his successor, Mark W. Ellingson.

Randall died in Boonsboro, Maryland in 1968.

Academic offices
| Preceded by Royal B. Farnum | President of the Rochester Athenæum and Mechanics Institute; 1922–1936 | Succeeded by Mark W. Ellingson |
