= Assumption University (Worcester) =

Catholic university in Massachusetts, US

- Former name: Assumption College (1904–2020)
- Motto: Until Christ Be Formed in You
- Type: Private university
- Established: October 1, 1904; 122 years ago
- Founder: Congregation of the Augustinians of the Assumption
- Religious affiliation: Roman Catholic (Assumptionist)
- Academic affiliations: NAICU, ACCU, IFCU, HECCMA
- President: Gregory S. Weiner
- Students: 2,037 (fall 2024)
- Undergraduates: 1,713 (fall 2024)
- Postgraduates: 324 (fall 2024)
- Location: Worcester, Massachusetts, United States; 42.2905°N 71.8295°W
- Campus: Suburban, 185 acres (74.9 ha)
- Colors: Blue and White
- Nickname: Greyhounds
- Sporting affiliations: NCAA Division II – Northeast-10 Conference
- Mascot: Pierre the Greyhound
- Website: assumption.edu
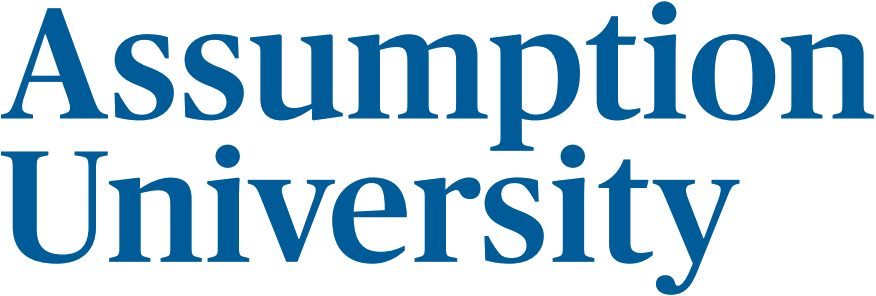

Assumption University is a private Catholic university in Worcester, Massachusetts, United States. It was founded in 1904 by the Augustinians of the Assumption. It enrolls about 2,000 students and offers 37 majors and 50 minors. The university confers Bachelor of Arts and Bachelor of Science degrees in its undergraduate program, and Master of Arts, Master of Science, and Master of Business Administration degrees as well as graduate study certificates.

With the transition from Assumption College to Assumption University in 2020, Assumption reorganized into five schools: the D'Amour College of Liberal Arts and Sciences, the Grenon School of Business, the Froelich School of Nursing, the School of Health Professions, and the School of Graduate Studies.

== History ==
=== Early years ===
Assumption was founded in 1904 by the Augustinians of the Assumption, a Catholic order under the Augustinian Rule dedicated to service through teaching and the hastening of the Kingdom of God, as reflected in their motto "Until Christ be Formed in You". The original campus was in the Greendale section of Worcester, on a tract of hillside land. In these early years, enrollment was exclusively male, primarily of French-Canadian heritage. Most courses were taught in French, with only a small number taught in English. On March 24, 1923, an arson fire destroyed the Greendale building that held both the college classrooms and the student dormitories.

On June 9, 1953, a violent F4 tornado cut a path of destruction through several western and central Massachusetts communities, including the city of Worcester. Several campus buildings were destroyed or severely damaged. Although the previously co-located Assumption Preparatory School stayed on the rebuilt campus until 1970, the college relocated to a new campus off Salisbury Street, on the west side of the city, officially opening in 1956. The old Assumption campus complex was sold to the state after the prep school closed and is today the home of Quinsigamond Community College.

=== Transition to university ===
On June 10, 2020, Assumption College officially transitioned to Assumption University. With this transition, the university reorganized into five schools: the D'Amour College of Liberal Arts and Sciences, the Grenon School of Business, the Froelich School of Nursing, the School of Health Professions, and the School of Graduate Studies.

On October 17, 2022, interim president Greg Weiner was appointed the 17th president of Assumption. President Weiner was formally installed at his inauguration held on March 23, 2023. He is the first Jewish president of a Catholic college or university in the United States.

Assumption's first class of nursing students graduated from the Froelich School of Nursing in 2023 with a 100 percent passing rate on the National Council Licensure Examination for registered nurses (NCLEX-RN). The program was then granted professional accreditation in 2024 from the Commission on Collegiate Nursing Education.

In October 2024, Assumption's Master of Science in Physician Assistant Studies program was granted accreditation-provisional status from the Accreditation Review Commission on Education for the Physician Assistant (ARC-PA). The first cohort of PA students began in January 2025.

In December 2024, five students at Assumption University were charged with kidnapping and conspiracy after an incident in which police said the students attacked an active-duty member of the U.S. military, accusing him of being a sexual predator. Police said there was no evidence that the man was trying to date anyone under age 18, but he had been lured to campus by a student who identified herself on the dating app Tinder as an adult. One of the five students was also charged with intimidation and another with assault and battery with a deadly weapon, after telling campus police that he slammed the victim's head into a car door. A sixth student involved was a minor. Police said the students posted videos of the attack online, participating in a fad on the video app TikTok based on the former reality TV show To Catch a Predator. Assumption president Greg Weiner said the behavior described by police was "abhorrent and antithetical to Assumption University's mission and values."

== Campus ==
Assumption's 185-acre (75 ha) campus is in Worcester, Massachusetts. The campus sits in a neighborhood off Salisbury Street on the northwest side of the city.

The original Assumption campus was in the Greendale section of Worcester but was destroyed in the 1953 Worcester tornado that killed nearly 94 people in central Massachusetts. Assumption relocated to its current location off Salisbury Street, officially opening in 1956 with the completion of La Maison Francaise. Many campus buildings prominently feature stained glass windows in their design, and in some cases (such as in the Chapel of the Holy Spirit) the windows were recovered from the university's Greendale campus, which was destroyed by the 1953 tornado, and are now dedicated in memory of the three Assumption community members who perished in the storm.

As of 2025, the campus consists of 47 buildings, including 16 residential options, 10 academic buildings, and six athletic facilities. The campus is also home to the Emmanuel d'Alzon Library, completed in 1988 and named after Emmanuel d'Alzon, a French Catholic priest who founded the Assumptionists.

The Chapel of the Holy Spirit serves as the center of the university's spiritual community. The Chapel and adjoining Tinsley Campus Ministry Center welcome students regardless of their religion to freely practice their faith through the various Catholic and interfaith services and facilities they offer.

As part of a university investment in developing a nursing program, the Richard J. and Sophia Catrambone Health Sciences Center was completed in November 2020. The 41,000-square-foot, three-story building features state-of-the-art nursing education equipment and is home to the Froelich School of Nursing.

In 2020, Assumption formally named Brian Kelly '83 Stadium in honor of football head coach Brian Kelly, a member of the class of 1983.

The university's primary dining hall, Taylor Dining Hall, underwent a $1 million renovation project in 2024 as a part of a new partnership with Aramark Collegiate Hospitality.

== Worcester Institute for Senior Education (WISE) ==
WISE, founded in 1993, "is a member-directed organization created in 1993 to provide lifelong learning opportunities for older adults."

== Athletics ==
Assumption University teams participate as a member of the National Collegiate Athletic Association's Division II in most sports. The Greyhounds are a member of the Northeast-10 Conference (NE10).

In 1979, Assumption became one of the founding member institutions of the NE10 (then the Northeast-7). Longtime Assumption men's basketball head coach Andy Laska is considered a "founding father" of the conference.

In 2022, it was announced that the women's ice hockey team would compete in the New England Women's Hockey Alliance, an NCAA Division I conference. It is the only team at Assumption to compete in Division I.

Current men's sports include baseball, basketball, cross country, football, golf, ice hockey, lacrosse, soccer, tennis and track & field; women's sports include basketball, cross country, field hockey, golf, ice hockey, lacrosse, rowing, soccer, softball, swimming & diving, tennis, track & field, and volleyball.

Assumption also offers several club sports, including men's and women's basketball, cheerleading, a dance team, equestrian, figure skating, fishing, gymnastics, Latin dance, martial arts, running, ultimate frisbee, men's and women's volleyball, women's soccer, and women's weightlifting.

In addition, Assumption offers intramural sports tournaments each academic year. These sports include 5v5 basketball, battleship, beach volleyball, dodgeball, flag football, floor hockey, indoor soccer, kickball, lawn games, ping-pong, soccer, soccer billiards, softball, volleyball, wallyball, and wiffle ball.

In 2024, Assumption earned its 14th straight NCAA President's Award for Academic Excellence, presented annually to NCAA Division II athletics programs with a 90 percent or higher academic success rate (ASR). Assumption is one of seven schools to win the award each year it has been presented.

== Notable alumni ==
Assumption Preparatory School graduates are included in this list of notable Assumption University alumni:

- Robert Catalanotti (1980), United States Army major general
- Chris Colabello (2003), Major League Baseball player
- Jacques Ducharme (1932), novelist and historian
- Ernest Fortin (1946), theology professor
- Jay A. García-Gregory (1966), United States federal judge
- Ashton Grant (2019), National Football League quarterbacks coach
- Mike Gravel (1949), United States senator from Alaska
- Frank C. Guinta (1993), United States congressman representing NH-01
- Andy Hallett (1997), singer and actor
- Deonte Harty (2019), National Football League player
- Jake Jones (1971), National Basketball Association player
- Brian Kelly (1983), college football coach
- Dan McKee (1973), 76th Governor of Rhode Island
- Nitza Morán, member of the Senate of Puerto Rico
- Harold Naughton Jr. (1982), Massachusetts State Legislator
- Joe O'Brien (1957), college basketball coach
- Mary O'Grady (1979), The Wall Street Journal editor
- Michael Ritchie (1979), artistic director of the Center Theatre Group
- Richard Ryscavage (1967), sociology professor
- Timothy J. Savage (1968), United States federal judge
- Scott Simonson (2014), National Football League player
- Jeffrey W. Talley (1985), 32nd Chief of United States Army Reserve
- Zach Triner (2014), National Football League player
