= Kate Gleason College of Engineering =

Engineering college at Rochester Institute of Technology

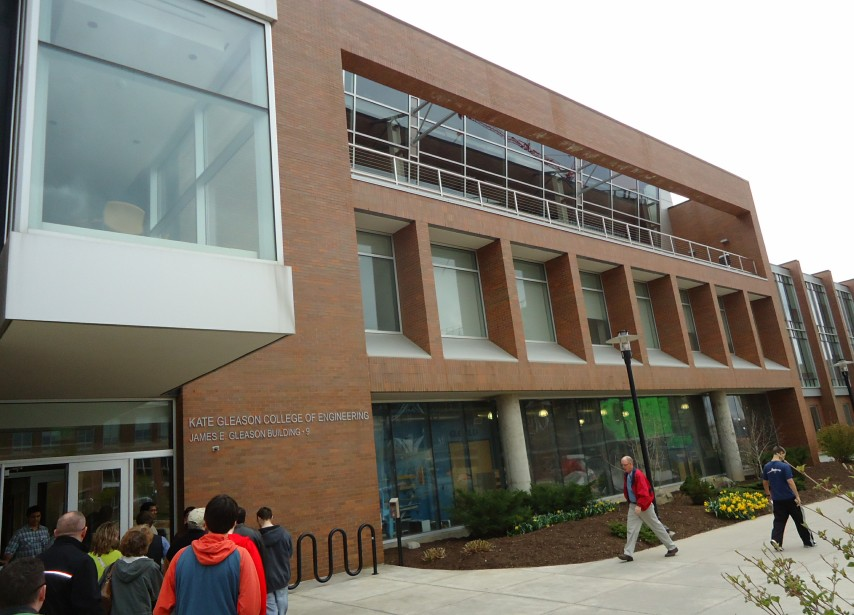
- View of the James E. Gleason Building from the entrance to the 2007 addition
- Former names: College of Engineering (1971–1998)
- Type: Engineering college
- Established: 1971
- Parent institution: Rochester Institute of Technology
- President: David C. Munson
- Vice-president: James Watters
- Provost: Jeremy Haefner
- Dean: Doreen D. Edwards
- Academic staff: 87 Tenure/Tenure-track faculty
- Students: 2,947
- Undergraduates: 2,547
- Postgraduates: 400
- Location: Rochester, New York, United States; 43.084288°N 77.677769°W
- Colors: Orange and black

The Kate Gleason College of Engineering (KGCOE) is the engineering college at the Rochester Institute of Technology. The college is home to all of RIT's engineering programs except for software engineering, which is part of the B. Thomas Golisano College of Computing and Information Sciences. Entering the 2023-24 academic year, the student body consisted of 2,947 students, with 400 graduate students. About 23% of the students were female.

== History ==
In 1885, the Rochester Mechanics' Institutes was founded as a school for fostering technical development in the Rochester area. In 1891, the Mechanics Institute merged with the Rochester Athenaeum, forming the Rochester Athenaeum and Mechanics Institute, in order to provide more comprehensive education for both of the student bodies. In 1944, the university adopted its current name of Rochester Institute of Technology. At this point, the RIT campus was still in downtown Rochester, and the engineering college was still in the original Mechanics Institute buildings. In 1968, the RIT moved to a combined campus in Henrietta, New York. The college remains there today and is housed at the James E. Gleason Building and the Center for Microelectronic Engineering.

In 1998, the College of Engineering was renamed the Kate Gleason College of Engineering in honor of benefactor and former Mechanics Institute student Kate Gleason, becoming the first engineering college in the United States to be named after a woman.

== Programs ==
The college includes the following departments and programs:

- Biomedical Engineering
- Chemical Engineering
- Computer Engineering
- Engineering Leadership
- Electrical and Microelectronic Engineering
- Industrial & Systems Engineering
- Mechanical Engineering

== Academics ==
All seven of KGCOE's bachelor's degree programs are ABET (Accreditation Board of Engineering and Technology) accredited, which is a prerequisite for licensure as a professional engineer in many states. In their final semester of study, graduating seniors in ABET approved majors are eligible to sit for the NCEES Fundamentals of Engineering (FE) section of the New York State Professional Engineering examination, which is the first step in the process for licensure as a Professional Engineer (PE).

The college offers the following degrees: Bachelor of Science (BS), Master of Science (MS), Master of Engineering (ME), and Doctor of Philosophy (PhD). There is an option for undergraduate students to enroll in an accelerated Bachelor's/Master's degree program to earn both degrees in an abbreviated time. Advanced certificates in Vibrations and Lean Six Sigma are also offered. Undergraduate certificates are also offered in mechatronics and integrated circuits.

Undergraduate engineering degrees require four blocks of co-op employment, totaling 48 weeks. These degree programs normally last five years, with two semesters being replaced by co-op blocks in addition to the traditional eight academic semesters. A single co-op usually spans one of these semester blocks in addition to a summer bock, necessitating two separate co-ops.

=== Organizations and clubs ===
The college is also home to many engineering student organizations and clubs, such as:

- RIT Clean Snowmobile
- Aero Design Club
- American Institute of Chemical Engineers
- American Society of Mechanical Engineers
- Biomedical Engineering Club
- Baja SAE Team
- Engineering House
- Engineers for a Sustainable World
- Electric Vehicle Team
- FIRST Robotics Team
- Formula SAE Team
- Hot Wheelz Formula SAE Electric Team
- IEEE Computer Society Student Chapter
- Multidisciplinary Robotics Club
- Institute of Electrical and Electronics Engineers
- Institute of Industrial Engineers
- Microelectronic Engineering Student Association
- National Society of Black Engineers
- Pi Tau Sigma (National Mechanical Engineering Honor Society)
- Society of Hispanic Professional Engineers
- Society of Manufacturing Engineers
- Society of Women Engineers
- RIT Space Exploration SPEX
- Tau Beta Pi
