= Todd Bullard =

American academic administrator

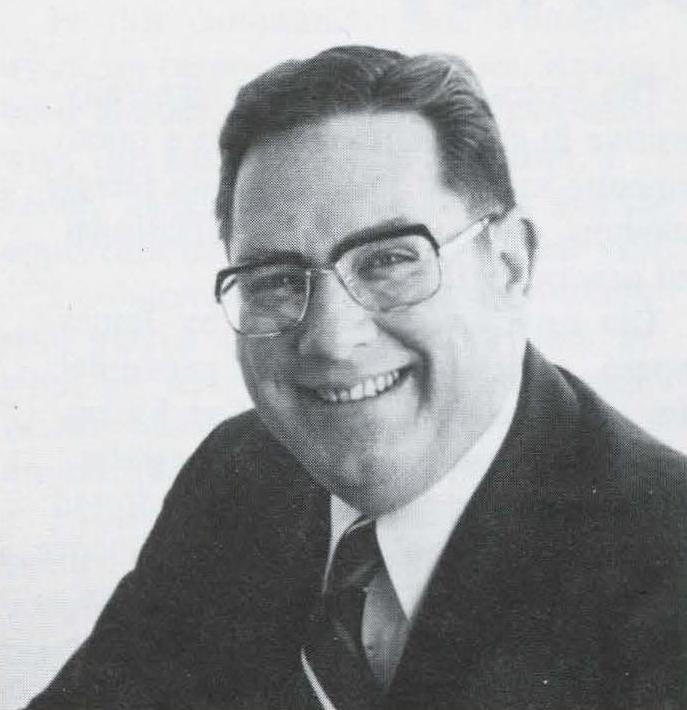
- Bullard circa 1980
- Born: May 31, 1931; Wheeling, West Virginia, U.S.
- Died: January 1, 2009 (aged 77)
- Education: West Liberty University (bachelor's); West Virginia University (master's); University of Pittsburgh (doctorate)
- Occupation: Academic administrator
- Relatives: Anne Hupp (ancestor)

Todd Hupp Bullard (May 31, 1931 – January 1, 2009) was a 20th-century American educator, most notable for having served as president of Potomac State College and Bethany College, and provost of Rochester Institute of Technology.

== Career ==
Bullard was born in Wheeling, West Virginia to L. Todd Bullard and Katharine Virginia Netting Bullard. He earned a bachelor's degree in history from West Liberty University in 1953 where he served as student body president and founded the Chi Nu fraternity. He went on to earn degrees in political science: First a master's degree from West Virginia University in 1956 and then a doctorate from the University of Pittsburgh in 1964.

His first position was as director of education at the West Virginia Penitentiary in Moundsville. He subsequently served in the Army for two years in Germany.

While in graduate school, he took his first administrative position, director of Parkersburg Community College. After graduating, he moved to become president of Potomac State College.

In March 1970, Bullard was tapped by the newly installed Rochester Institute of Technology president Paul A. Miller to become that institution's first provost. His mission was to improve the "educational level and quality" of the institute.

In June 1980, he assumed the presidency of Bethany College.

Bullard's professional activities included serving as president of the West Virginia Foundation of Independent Colleges and the West Virginia Association of college and University Presidents. He also served as commissioner-at-large of the North Central Association of Colleges and Schools, chairman of the Council of Chief Academic Officers, Rochester Area Colleges, and member and chair of evaluation teams of the Middle States Association of Colleges and Schools, the North Central Association of Colleges and Schools, and the Southern Association of Colleges and Schools.

After retiring, he took a position as scholar-in-residence for the Center for Public Service at the University of Virginia, where he worked until 1991.

He is also a descendant of Anne Hupp, who was famous for defending Miller's Blockhouse from a Shawnee Indian attack, in 1782, for over 24 hours after her husband and father were killed.

He died of complications from diabetes.

Academic offices
Preceded by First	Director of Parkersburg Community College; 1962 – 1964	Succeeded by Billy L. Coffindaffer
Preceded by Ernest E. Church	President of Potomac State College; 1964 – 1970	Succeeded by Last
Preceded by First	Provost of Rochester Institute of Technology; August 1, 1970 – 1980	Succeeded by Robert G. Quinn
Preceded by William E. Tucker	President of Bethany College; 1980 – 1988	Succeeded by D. Duane Cummins
