= Andrew Sears =

American computer scientist

- Born: Newton, Massachusetts, U.S.
- Education: Rensselaer Polytechnic Institute; University of Maryland, College Park
- Scientific career
- Fields: Human-Computer Interaction; Human-Centered Computing
- Workplaces: DePaul University; UMBC; Rochester Institute of Technology; The Pennsylvania State University; Syracuse University
- Doctoral advisor: Ben Shneiderman

Andrew Sears is an American computer scientist. He was a professor and dean of the School of Information Studies at Syracuse University and became Provost at Worcester Polytechnic Institute on August 1, 2024.

His research explores issues related to human-computer interaction including mobile computing, speech recognition, information technology accessibility, and situationally-induced impairments and disabilities. He earned his B.S. in Computer Science from Rensselaer Polytechnic Institute and his Ph.D. from the University of Maryland Department of Computer Science in College Park. His expert opinion on information technology and IT workforce issues has been reported by a variety of media sources.

== Biography ==
Sears was born in Newton, Massachusetts, and attended Natick High School located in Natick, Massachusetts. He pursued undergraduate studies at Rensselaer Polytechnic Institute, graduating in 1988 with a BS in Computer Science. Subsequently, Sears pursued graduate studies at the University of Maryland, College Park, earning a PhD in Computer Science (1993). His dissertation, titled "Layout Appropriateness: Guiding user interface design with simple task descriptions" was chaired by Ben Shneiderman, with whom he worked in the Human-Computer Interaction Lab.

Upon receiving his Ph.D. from the University of Maryland, College Park, Sears joined the faculty of the School of Computer Science, Information Systems, and Telecommunications at DePaul University in Chicago. He accepted a position with the Information Systems Department at UMBC in 1999, serving as the Chair of the Information Systems Department from 2002 until 2011. Sears joined RIT as Dean of the B. Thomas Golisano College of Computing and Information Sciences in 2011. Sears joined The Pennsylvania State University as Dean of the College of Information Sciences and Technology (IST) in 2015, serving as the university's Interim Chief Information Security Officer from September 2015 until December 2016. Sears joined Syracuse University as Dean of the School of Information Studies in 2023. He accepted the position of Senior Vice President and Provost of Worcester Polytechnic Institute in Worcester, Massachusetts in June 2024.

Sears has been actively involved with the Association for Computing Machinery's Special Interest Group on Accessible Computing (SIGACCESS) since 2001 when he was elected Secretary/Treasurer of the group. In 2006 he was elected Vice Chair of SIGACCESS and in 2009 he was elected to serve as the chair of the group. In 2010, Sears was named a Distinguished Scientist by the Association for Computing Machinery (ACM). He has chaired the premier conferences in the fields of human-computer interaction (CHI) and computer accessibility (ASSETS). He also served in numerous other capacities on the organizing committees of these and other conferences. His research and expert opinion on information technology and IT workforce issues have been reported by a variety of media sources including The New York Times, The Chronicle of Higher Education, ComputerWorld, InformationWeek, Baltimore Business Journal, the Baltimore Examiner, WEAA radio, WYPR radio, and Maryland Public Television. Sears, working with Vicki Hanson, served as founding Editor-in-Chief of the ACM Transactions on Accessible Computing (2006-2013). He is co-editor of the first two editions of the Human-Computer Interaction Handbook, published by CRC Press.

== Research interests ==
Sears' research interests focus on the field of human-computer interaction (HCI) with much of his research focusing on accessibility-related issues. His early research focused on understanding and enhancing how people interact with touchscreen-based interfaces as well as demonstrating the benefits that could be obtained by integrating information about usage patterns as interfaces are organized. More recently, much of his research has addressed issues that affect the accessibility of information technologies. Sears employs a broad definition of accessibility which addresses the issues involved in ensuring that individuals with disabilities have access to and can effectively use information technologies as well as the challenges that are associated with situationally-induced disabilities. Sears defines situationally-induced disabilities as the difficulties individuals experience when the conditions in which they are working, or the activities in which they are engaged, result in demands that exceed the user's capabilities. Environment-based examples include interacting with information technologies in suboptimal lighting conditions, a noisy environment, extreme temperatures, or a moving vehicle. Activity-based examples include interacting with information technologies as a secondary task while actively engaged in providing health care, operating a moving vehicle, or participating in a meeting.
