= College of Computing and Information Science =

College of Computing and Information Science may refer to:

- Cornell Computing and Information Science at Cornell University
- Golisano College of Computing and Information Sciences at the Rochester Institute of Technology
