= John Resig =

American software engineer, creator of jQuery (born 1984)

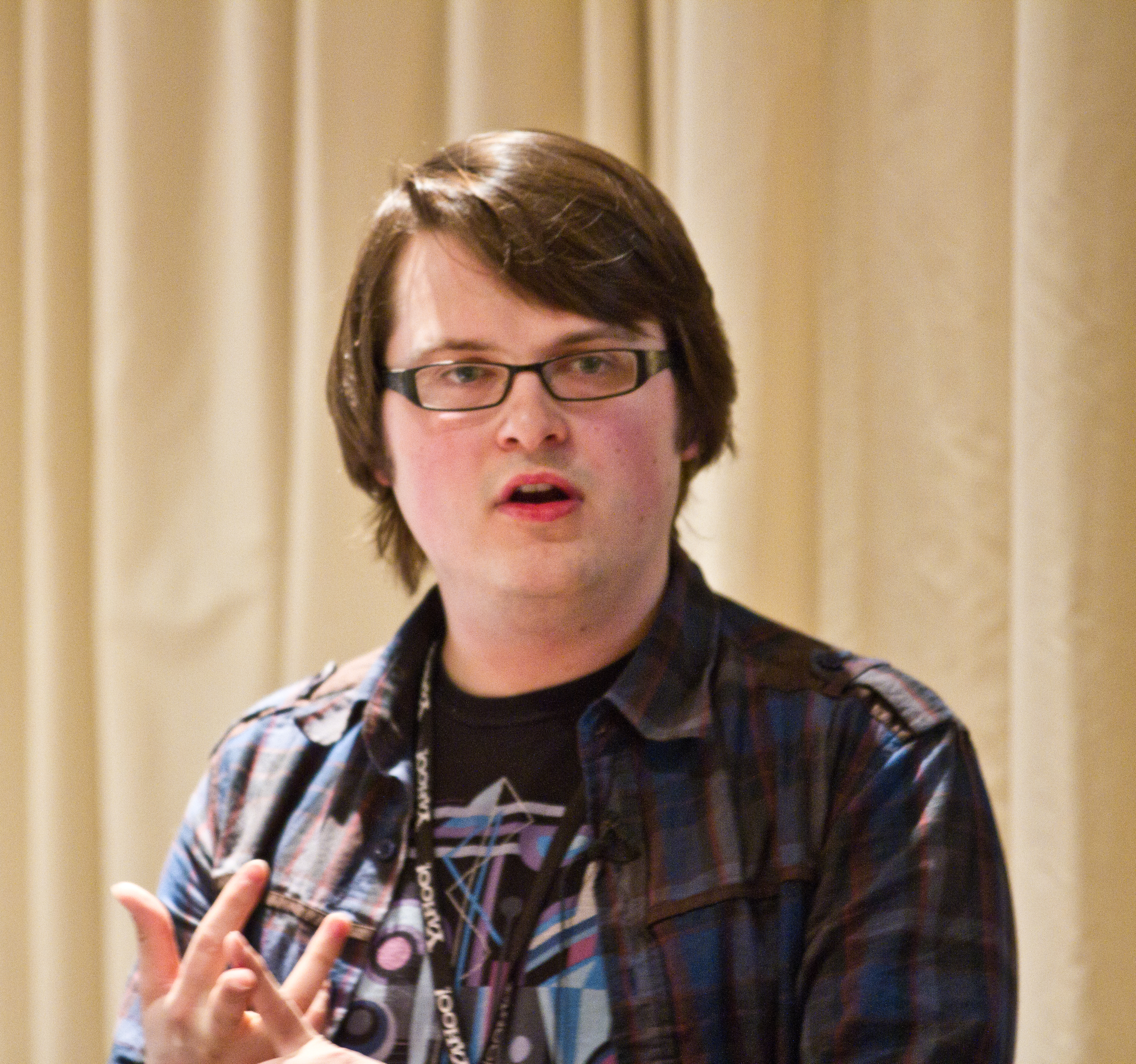
- Resig in 2010
- Born: May 8, 1984 (age 42); Boston, Massachusetts, U.S.
- Education: Rochester Institute of Technology (BS)
- Occupations: Software engineer; author
- Employer: Khan Academy
- Known for: jQuery; Processing.js; Ukiyo-e.org
- Website: johnresig.com

John Resig (born May 8, 1984) is an American software engineer and author, best known as the creator of jQuery, the most widely used JavaScript library. jQuery is used by approximately 64.2% of all websites. He is the chief software architect at Khan Academy, where he has worked since 2011.

== Early life and education ==
Resig earned a Bachelor of Science degree in computer science from the Rochester Institute of Technology's Golisano College of Computing and Information Sciences in 2009. During his time at RIT, he conducted research on data mining instant messaging networks with professor Ankur Teredesai and Christopher Homan, and explored real-time online collaboration methods with professor Jon Schull. He was a member of RIT's Computer Science House and was named its House Member of the Year during his sophomore year.

== Career ==
=== jQuery and Mozilla ===
Resig began developing jQuery in 2005 while still a student at RIT, frustrated with the inconsistencies in cross-browser JavaScript development. He publicly released jQuery at BarCamp NYC in January 2006. The library quickly gained adoption, with the Drupal content management system selecting it as a core component, and major companies including Google, Microsoft, and Apple incorporating it into their websites.

From 2007 to 2011, Resig worked at the Mozilla Corporation, initially as a JavaScript evangelist and later as a JavaScript tool developer. In a 2015 interview with IEEE Computer, Resig discussed the origins of jQuery and its evolution into a critical component of the browser software ecosystem.

Beyond jQuery, Resig created or contributed to several other JavaScript projects, including:

- Processing.js, a port of the Processing language to JavaScript
- Sizzle, a standalone CSS selector engine that was later extracted from jQuery
- TestSwarm, a distributed continuous integration testing framework for JavaScript

=== Khan Academy ===
Resig joined Khan Academy in May 2011 as an application developer and rose to the position of chief software architect. In 2012, he led the development of Khan Academy's computer programming curriculum, creating interactive learning environments designed for beginners with no prior programming experience. In a lecture at RIT covered by Opensource.com, Resig described how middle-school-aged students with no prior programming experience were able to create animations with variables and logic within three hours of using the platform.

=== Digital humanities ===
Resig has applied his programming skills to digital humanities research, particularly in Japanese art history. In December 2012, he launched Ukiyo-e.org, a database and image similarity search engine for Japanese woodblock prints that aggregates over 220,000 images from more than 24 museums, universities, libraries, and auction houses worldwide. The arts publication Colossal described the site as collecting a wide range of prints from the early 18th century to the present, organized by artist and time period, with an image comparison system enabling scholars to study different iterations of similar prints across global collections. The Society for the History of Children and Youth noted that the site helps unify artist names that vary across collections and translates Kanji names, calling it a significant resource for researchers.

Resig has been a visiting researcher at Ritsumeikan University in Kyoto, focusing on the study of ukiyo-e, and has served as a board member of the Japanese Art Society of America. He has presented his digital humanities research at the Japanese Association for Digital Humanities conference (2013) and the Digital Humanities 2014 conference.

== Publications ==
Resig is the author of several books on JavaScript:

- Pro JavaScript Techniques (Apress, 2006)
- Secrets of the JavaScript Ninja (with Bear Bibeault, Manning Publications, 2012; second edition 2016)
- The GraphQL Guide (with Loren Sands-Ramshaw, self-published, 2021)

== Awards and honors ==
- 2009: .Net Magazine Award for Best Open Source Application (jQuery), beating Firefox and WordPress in the final vote
- 2010: Inducted into the Rochester Institute of Technology Innovation Hall of Fame (inaugural class)
- 2015: Distinguished Alumni Award from Rochester Institute of Technology

== Personal life ==
Resig lives in the Hudson Valley of New York with his partner, composer and multimedia artist Nell Shaw Cohen.
