= Rochester Institute of Technology =

Private university in Rochester, New York, US

- Former names: Rochester Athenæum (1829–1891); The Mechanics Institute (1885–1891); Rochester Athenæum and Mechanics Institute (1891–1944)
- Type: Private research university
- Established: 1829; 197 years ago
- Academic affiliations: AITU; RAC; NAICU; Space-grant
- Endowment: $1.46 billion (FY2025)
- President: William H. Sanders
- Provost: Prabu David
- Faculty: 1,547 (Full-time, part-time, adjunct)
- Administrative staff: 2,642
- Students: 20,570
- Undergraduates: 17,528
- Postgraduates: 3,042
- Location: Henrietta, New York, United States; 43°05′05″N 77°40′34″W
- Campus: Suburban 1,300 acres (5.3 km^{2})
- Colors: Orange, white, and black
- Nickname: Tigers
- Sporting affiliations: NCAA: Liberty League; AHC; CHA; MAISA; USCSA
- Mascot: RITchie the Tiger
- Website: rit.edu

The Rochester Institute of Technology (RIT) is a private research university in Henrietta, New York, United States, a suburb of Rochester. It was founded in 1829. It is one of only two institutes of technology in New York state, the other being the New York Institute of Technology.

RIT enrolls about 21,000 students, of whom 18,000 are undergraduate and 3,000 are graduate students. These students come from all 50 states in the United States and more than 100 countries. The university has more than 4,000 faculty and staff. It also has campuses abroad in Croatia, Kosovo, and the United Arab Emirates. The university is classified among "R2: Doctoral Universities – High research activity". It operates the publisher RIT Press, a university press.

== History ==
The university began as a result of an 1891 merger between Rochester Athenæum, a struggling literary society founded in 1829 by Colonel Nathaniel Rochester and associates, and The Mechanics Institute, a Rochester school of practical technical training for local residents founded in 1885 by a consortium of local businessmen including Captain Henry Lomb, co-founder of Bausch & Lomb. The name of the merged institution at the time was called Rochester Athenæum and Mechanics Institute (RAMI). The Mechanics Institute was considered as the surviving school and took over The Rochester Athenæum's 1829 founding charter. From the time of the merger until 1944, many of its students, administration and faculty staff alike, not only celebrated the former Mechanics Institute's 1885 founding charter, but its former name as well. In 1944, the school changed its name to Rochester Institute of Technology, re-established The Athenæum's 1829 founding charter and became a full-fledged research university.

RIT's traditional seal

The university originally resided within the city of Rochester, New York, proper, on a block bounded by the Erie Canal, South Plymouth Avenue, Spring Street, and South Washington Street (approximately 43.152632°N 77.615157°W). Its art department was originally located in the Bevier Memorial Building. By the middle of the twentieth century, RIT began to outgrow its facilities, and surrounding land was scarce and expensive; additionally, in 1959, the New York Department of Public Works announced a new freeway, the Inner Loop, was to be built through the city along a path that bisected the university's campus and required demolition of key university buildings. In 1961, a donation of $3.27 million from local Grace Watson, for whom RIT's dining hall was later named, allowed the university to purchase land for a new 1,300-acre (5.3 km^{2}) campus several miles south along the east bank of the Genesee River in suburban Henrietta. Upon completion in 1968, the university moved to the new suburban campus, where it resides today.

In 1966, RIT was selected by the federal government to be the site of the newly founded National Technical Institute for the Deaf (NTID). NTID admitted its first students in 1968, concurrent with RIT's transition to the Henrietta campus.

In 1979, RIT took over Eisenhower College, a liberal arts college located in Seneca Falls, New York. Despite making a 5-year commitment to keep Eisenhower open, RIT announced in July 1982 that the college would close immediately. One final year of operation by Eisenhower's academic program took place in the 1982–83 school year on the Henrietta campus. The final Eisenhower graduation took place in May 1983 back in Seneca Falls.

University rankings

National – Overall
- USNWR National: 88 (2026)

The microelectronic engineering program, created in 1982 is the only ABET-accredited undergraduate program in of its type the country. At its inception, it was the nation's first Bachelor of Science program specializing in the fabrication of semiconductor devices and integrated circuits. In 1990, RIT started its first PhD program, in imaging science – the first PhD program of its kind in the U.S. The information technology program was the first nationally recognized IT degree, created in 1993. In 1996, RIT became the first college in the U.S. to offer a Software Engineering degree at the undergraduate level.

== Campus ==
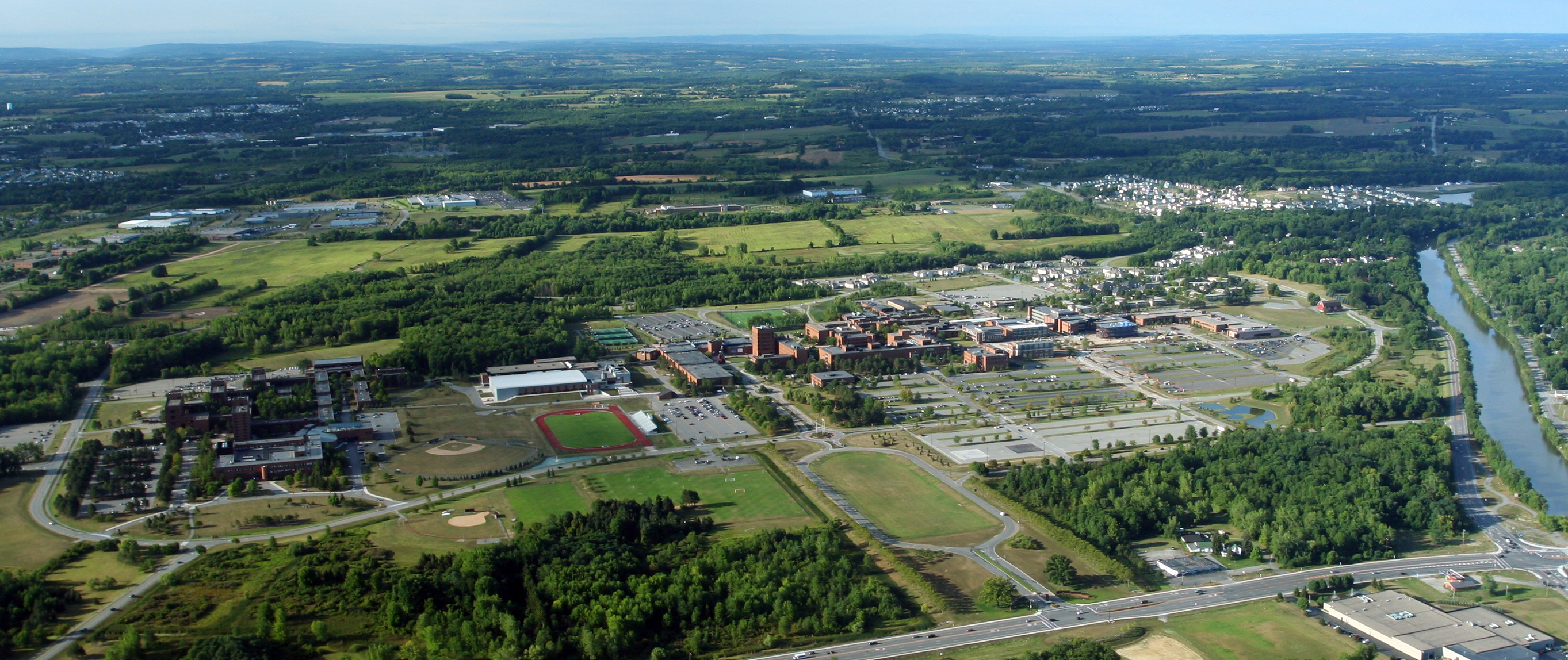
The RIT campus as seen from the air, looking south, Genesee River on the right (2007).

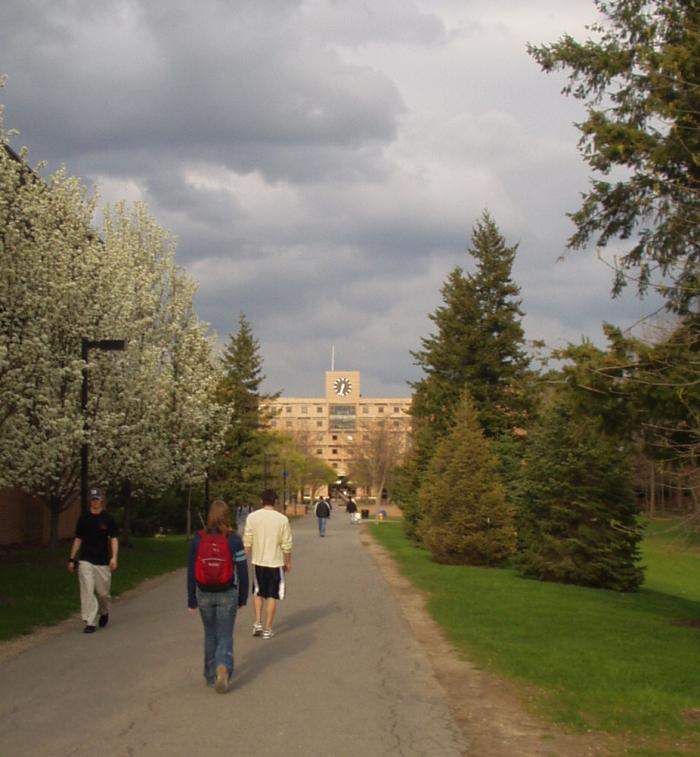
RIT's Quarter Mile walkway

The main campus is housed on a 1,300 acres (5.3 km^{2}) property. This property is largely covered with woodland and fresh-water swamp making it a very diverse wetland that is home to a number of somewhat rare plant species. The campus comprises 237 buildings and 5.1 million square feet (470,000 m^{2}) of building space. The nearly universal use of bricks in the campus's construction – estimated at 15,710,693 bricks as of August 6, 2018 – prompted students to give it the semi-affectionate nickname "Brick City," reflected in the name of events such as the annual "Brick City Homecoming." Though the buildings erected in the first few decades of the campus's existence reflected the architectural style known as brutalism, the warm color of the bricks softened the impact somewhat. More recent additions to the campus have diversified the architecture while still incorporating the traditional brick colors. The main campus was listed as a census-designated place in 2020.

In 2009, the campus was named a "Campus Sustainability Leader" by the Sustainable Endowments Institute.

The residence halls and the academic side of campus are connected with a walkway called the "Quarter Mile". Along the Quarter Mile, between the academic and residence hall side are various administration and support buildings. On the academic side of the walkway is a courtyard, known as the Infinity Quad due to a striking polished stainless steel sculpture (by Jose' de Rivera, 1968, 19'×8'×2 1/2') of a continuous ribbon-like Möbius strip (commonly referred to as the infinity loop because if the sun hits the strip at a certain angle it will cast a shadow in the shape of an infinity symbol on the ground) in the middle of it; on the residence hall side is a sundial and a clock. Standing near the Administration Building and the Student Alumni Union is The Sentinel, a steel structure created by the acclaimed metal sculptor, Albert Paley. Reaching 70 feet (21 m) high and weighing 110 tons, the sculpture is the largest on any American university campus. There are four on-campus RIT-owned apartment complexes: Global Village, Perkins Green, Riverknoll, and University Commons. RIT also operates two off-campus apartment complexes: 175 Jefferson Road, and RIT Inn and & Conference Center

Along the Quarter Mile is the Gordon Field House, a 160,000 sq ft (15,000 m^{2}), two-story athletic center. Opened in 2004 and named in honor of Lucius "Bob" Gordon and his wife Marie, the Field House hosts numerous campus and community activities, including concerts, career fairs, athletic competitions, graduations, and other functions. Other facilities between the residence halls and academic buildings include the Hale-Andrews Student Life Center, Student Alumni Union, Ingle Auditorium, Clark Gymnasium, Frank Ritter Memorial Ice Arena, and the Schmitt Interfaith Center.

RIT opened MAGIC Spell Studios in 2018. The 52,000 square-foot facility hosts video game and media development labs, 2D and 3D animation labs, sound mixing, a color-correcting suite, sound stage and more..

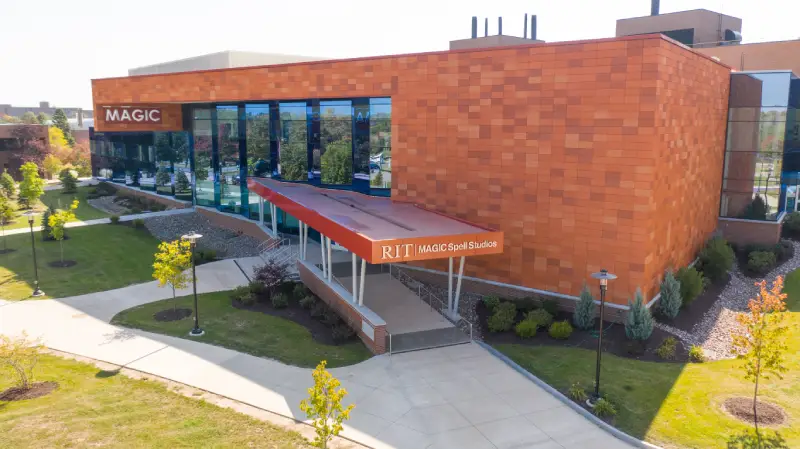
An aerial photograph of the MAGIC Spell Studios building at RIT. The building opened in 2018

In 2023, the university opened the Student Hall for Exploration and Development (SHED), the largest project for RIT since the campus moved to Henrietta in 1968. The SHED houses 22 classrooms, as well as makerspaces, studios, and performing arts facilities, including the Sklarsky Glassbox Theater.

In December 2025, RIT opened a 39,000-square-foot Research Building with 19 laboratories supporting work in fields including artificial intelligence, cognitive science, neuroscience, advanced manufacturing, and wet chemistry.

In April 2026, RIT opened the 50,000-square-foot RIT Performing Arts Center, which includes a refurbished Barton Opus 234 organ and an outdoor amphitheater. Along with the SHED, it is one of only two primary non-brick buildings on campus.

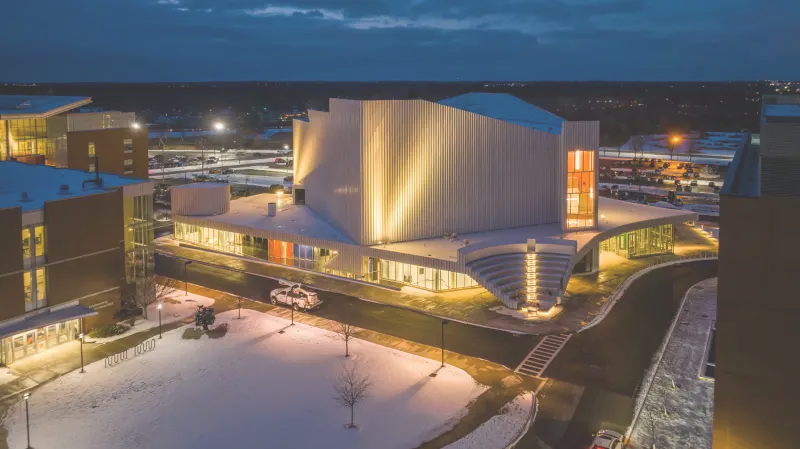
The RIT Performing Arts Center at nightfall.

=== Art on campus ===
The RIT Art Collection, part of the RIT Archive Collections at RIT Libraries, comprises thousands of works, including hundreds by RIT faculty, students, and alumni. The collection grows every year through the Purchase Prize Program, which enables the university to purchase select art works from students in the School of Art and Design, the School for American Crafts, and the School of Photographic Arts and Sciences.

Many pieces from the collection are on public display around campus, including:

- Sentinel – a 73-foot-tall sculpture created by the acclaimed metal sculptor, Albert Paley, located on Administration Circle.
- Growth and Youth – a set of two murals by Josef Albers located in the lobby of the George Eastman Building.
- Principia – a mural by Larry Kirkland that is etched into the black granite floor of the atrium in the College of Science (Gosnell Hall). The work features illustrations, symbols, formulae, quotes, and images representing milestones in the history of science.
- Three Piece Reclining Figure No. 1 – a bronze sculpture by English artist Henry Moore located in Eastman Kodak Quad.
- Grand Hieroglyph – a 24-foot-long tapestry by Shiela Hicks located in the George Eastman Building.
- Sundial – a sculpture by Alistair Bevington located on the Residence Quad.
- The Monument to Ephemeral Facts – a mixed media sculpture by Douglas Holleley located in Wallace Library.
- Unity – a 24-foot-tall stainless steel sculpture sited between the College of Art and Design, the College of Engineering Technology, and the College of Engineering.

=== Demographics ===
The RIT campus was listed as a census-designated place (CDP) in the 2020 U.S. census with a population of 7,322 at the 2020 census.

Rochester Institute of Technology CDP, New York – Racial and ethnic composition Note: the US Census treats Hispanic/Latino as an ethnic category. This table excludes Latinos from the racial categories and assigns them to a separate category. Hispanics/Latinos may be of any race.
| Race / Ethnicity (NH = Non-Hispanic) | Pop 2020 | % 2020 |
|---|---|---|
| White alone (NH) | 4,728 | 64.57% |
| Black or African American alone (NH) | 384 | 5.24% |
| Native American or Alaska Native alone (NH) | 14 | 0.19% |
| Asian alone (NH) | 1,232 | 16.83% |
| Native Hawaiian or Pacific Islander alone (NH) | 0 | 0.00% |
| Other race alone (NH) | 45 | 0.61% |
| Mixed race or Multiracial (NH) | 357 | 4.88% |
| Hispanic or Latino (any race) | 562 | 7.68% |
| Total | 7,322 | 100.00% |

== Organization and administration ==
As of July 2025, the president is William H. Sanders, formerly the dean of the College of Engineering at Carnegie Mellon University. Sanders, the university's eleventh president, replaced David C. Munson, who retired after serving eight years at RIT. Prabu David, formerly vice provost at Michigan State University, was named provost in August 2023. He replaced Ellen Granberg, the first woman to serve in that role at RIT.

The school is also a member of the Association of Independent Technological Universities.

=== Colleges ===
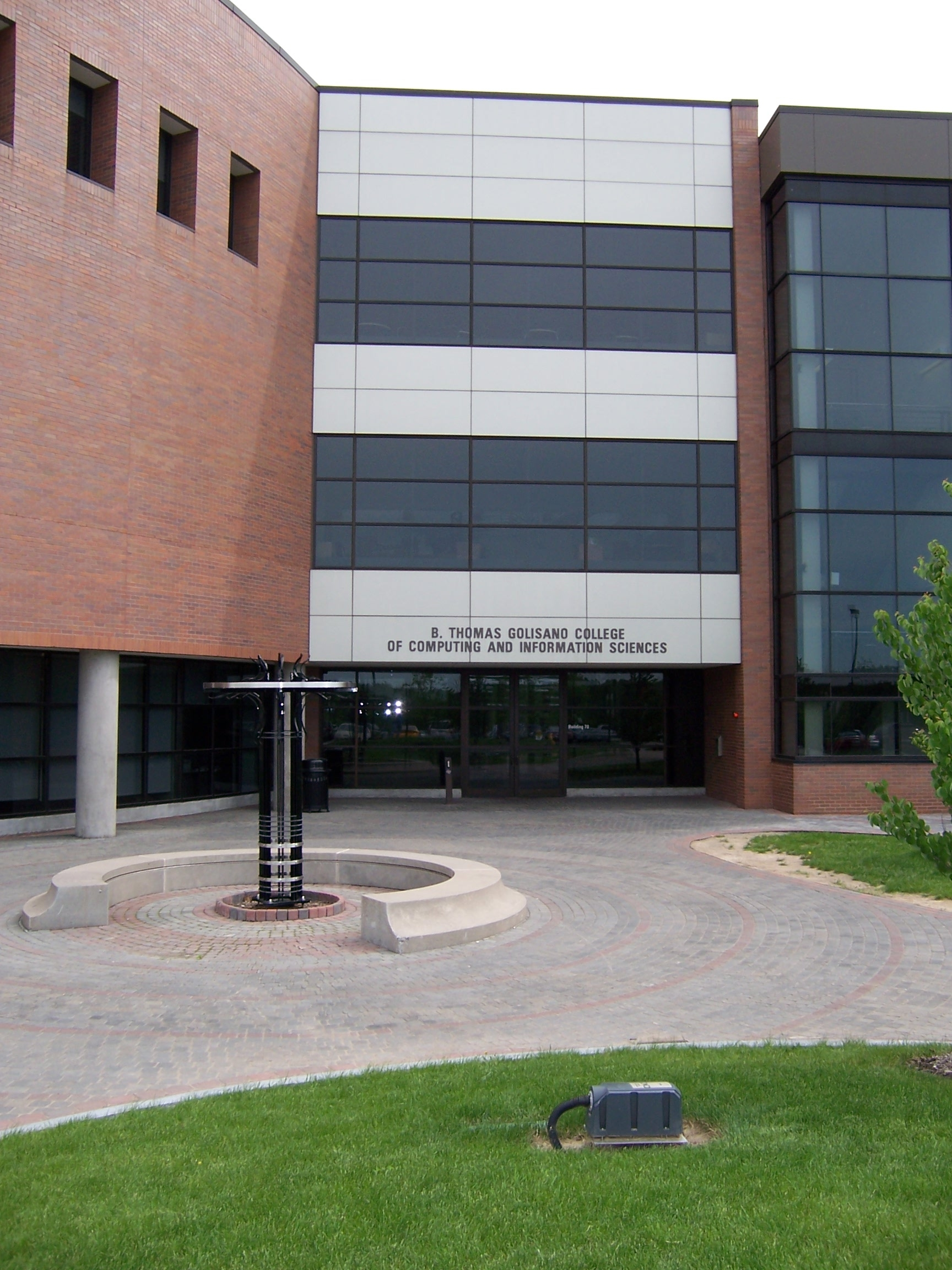
The B. Thomas Golisano College of Computing and Information Sciences building

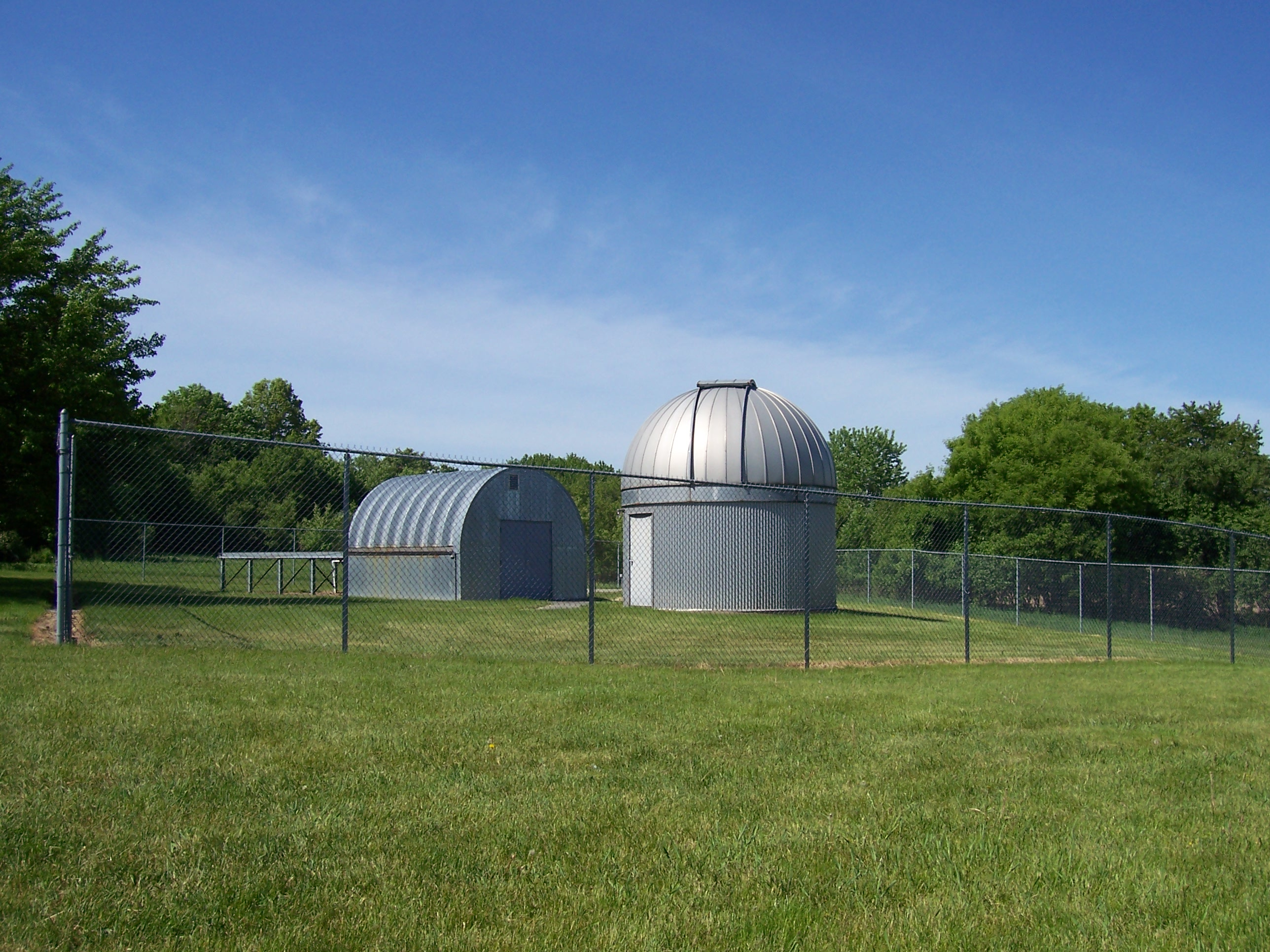
RIT Observatory

RIT has nine colleges:

- College of Art and Design
- Saunders College of Business
- Golisano College of Computing and Information Sciences
- Kate Gleason College of Engineering
- College of Engineering Technology
- College of Health Sciences and Technology
- College of Liberal Arts
- National Technical Institute for the Deaf
- College of Science

There are also two smaller academic units that grant RIT degrees but do not have full college faculties:

- Golisano Institute for Sustainability
- School of Individualized Study (SOIS)

In addition to these colleges, RIT operates campuses in Europe and in the Middle East:

- RIT Croatia (formerly the American College of Management and Technology) in Dubrovnik and Zagreb, Croatia
- RIT Kosovo (formerly the American University in Kosovo) in Pristina, Kosovo
- RIT Dubai in Dubai, United Arab Emirates

== Academics ==
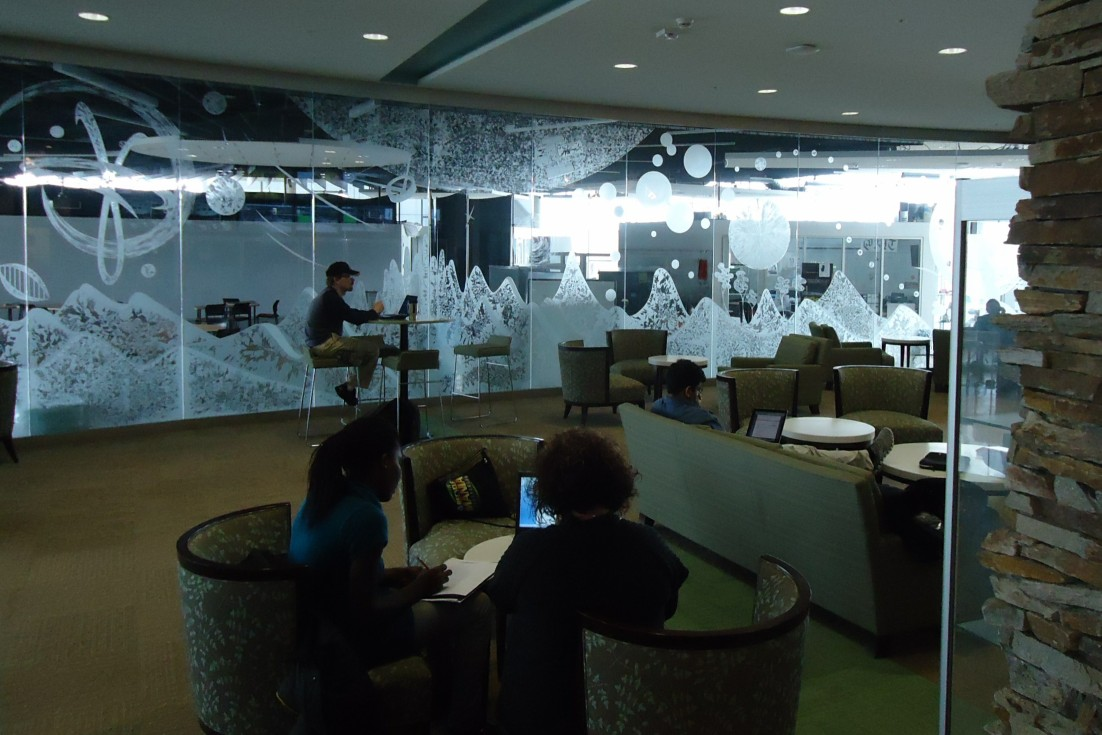
Inside view of the lounge area of the University Services Center, home to the Student Innovation Center, and the university's finance department.

The university is chartered by the New York state legislature and accredited by the Middle States Association of Colleges and Schools. The university offers more than 200 academic programs, including seven doctoral programs across its nine constituent colleges. In 2008–2009, RIT awarded 2,483 bachelor's degrees, 912 master's degrees, 10 doctorates, and 523 other certificates and diplomas.

The four-year, full-time undergraduate program constitutes the majority of enrollments at the university and emphasizes instruction in the "arts & sciences/professions." RIT is a member of the Rochester Area College consortium, which allows students to register at other colleges in the Rochester metropolitan area without tuition charges. RIT's full-time undergraduate and graduate programs used to operate on an approximately 10-week quarter system with the primary three academic quarters beginning on Labor Day in early September and ending in late May. In August 2013, RIT transitioned from a quarter system to a semester system. The change was hotly debated on campus, with a majority of students opposed according to an informal survey; Student Government also voted against the change.

Among the eight colleges, 6.8% of the student body is enrolled in the Saunders College of Business, 15.0% in the Kate Gleason College of Engineering, 4.3% in the College of Liberal Arts, 25.4% in the College of Applied Science and Technology, 18.0% in the B. Thomas Golisano College of Computing and Information Sciences, 13.9% in the College of Imaging Arts and Science, 5.7% in the National Technical Institute for the Deaf, and 9.2% in the College of Science. The five most commonly awarded degrees are in Business Administration, Engineering Technology, School of Photographic Arts & Sciences, School of Art and Design, and Information Technology.

RIT has struggled with student retention, although the situation has improved during president Destler's tenure. 91.3% of freshmen in the fall of 2009 registered for fall 2010 classes, which Destler noted as a school record.

=== Student body ===
Demographics of student body
| | Undergraduate | Graduate | U.S. census |
|---|---|---|---|
| African American | 6.1% | 4.9% | 12.6% |
| Asian American | 6.9% | 6.9% | 4.8% |
| White American | 76.5% | 80.4% | 63.7% |
| Hispanic American | 7.3% | 6.0% | 16.4% |
| Multiple Races | 2.9% | 1.4% | 2.9% |
| Native American | 0.2% | 0.4% | 0.9% |
| International student | 778 | 1,472 | N/A |

RIT enrolled 18,532 undergraduate and 2,875 graduate students in fall 2025. Admissions are characterized as "more selective, higher transfer-in" by the Carnegie Foundation. RIT received 24,269 applications for undergraduate admission in Fall 2023, 71% were admitted, 18% enrolled, and 88% of students re-matriculated as second-year students. Median SAT scores were 680 for SAT Evidence-Based Reading and Writing and 690 for SAT Math. The median ACT Composite score was 31. Graduation outcomes reflect RIT’s experiential learning model. For the incoming cohort of 2018, 28% of students graduated within four years, while 71.5% graduated within six years.

Academic rankings

National
- Forbes: 217
- U.S. News & World Report: 88
- Washington Monthly: 218
- WSJ/College Pulse: 161

Global
- ARWU: 1000
- QS: 951-1000
- THE: 601-800
- U.S. News & World Report: 721

=== Rankings ===
U.S. News & World Report, 2026 Graduate Rankings
| Biological Sciences | 104 |
| Business | 93 |
| Computer Science | 76 |
| Engineering | 76 |
| Fine Arts | 49 |
| Occupational Therapy | 229 |
| Physician Assistant | 119 |
| Physics | 86 |

In the 2026 edition of U.S. News & World Report, RIT was ranked No. 88 among National Universities. Business Insider ranked RIT No. 14 in Northeast and No. 36 in the country for Computer Science. RIT was ranked among the top 50 national universities in a national survey of "High School Counselors Top College Picks". RIT's Saunders College of Business ranked No. 26 in the United States for "Best Online MBA Programs" for the online executive MBA program by U.S. News & World Report. Times Higher Education/The Wall Street Journal ranked the MBA program at Saunders College of Business No. 54 among business colleges and universities around the world for the year 2019. RIT was ranked among the top 20 universities recognized for excellent co-operative learning and internship programs. It was further placed at No. 24 in the top 30 universities for Computer Science with the best Returns on Investment (ROI) in the US.

The Princeton Review ranked RIT's game design and development program No. 6 nationally at the undergraduate level and No. 10 at the graduate level in 2025. Among the top 75 universities for Video Game Design in the US, RIT was ranked No. 4.

=== Co-op Program ===
RIT's co-op program, which began in 1912, is the fourth-oldest in the world. It is also the fifth-largest in the nation, with approximately 3,500 students completing a co-op each year at over 2,000 businesses. The program requires (or allows, depending on major) students to work in the workplace for up to five quarters alternating with quarters of class. The amount of co-op varies by major, usually between 3 and 5 three-month "blocks" or academic quarters. Many employers prefer students to co-op for two consecutive blocks, referred to as a "double-block co-op". During a co-op, the student is not required to pay tuition to the school and is still considered a "full time" student.

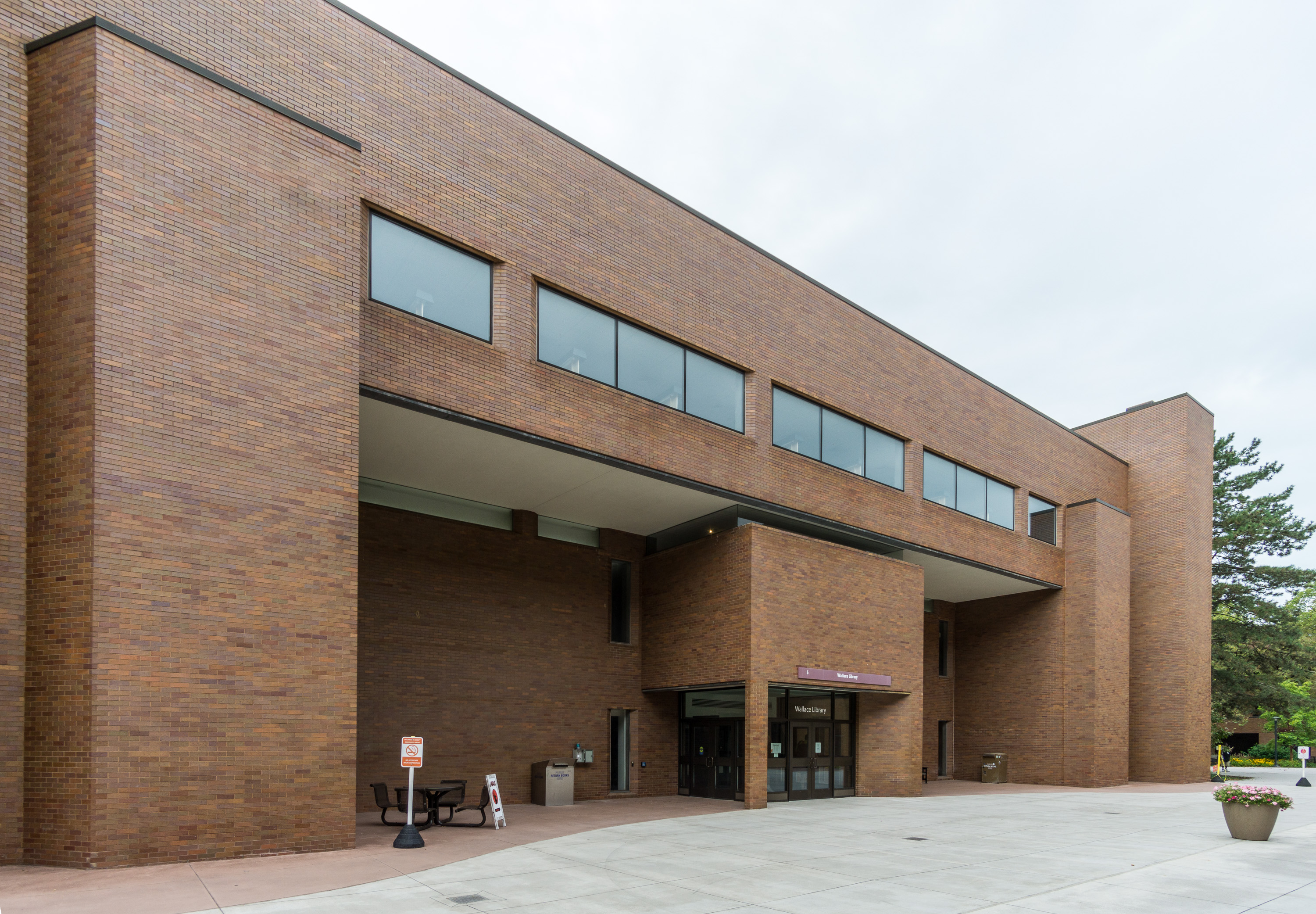
Wallace Library

=== Library and Special collections ===
RIT library services are based in the Wallace Library. The Cary Graphic Arts Collection contains books, manuscripts, printing-type specimens, letterpress printing equipment, documents, and other artifacts related to the history of graphic communication. The Kubert Comics Lounge and Gallery features rotating exhibits of comics art and other popular arts, as well as comic book artist Joe Kubert's drafting table from the Kubert School and a collection of books from the artist's personal library. RIT Archives document more than 180 years of the university's history, and students in the Museum Studies program frequently work with these artifacts and help create exhibitions. The RIT/NTID Deaf Studies Archive preserves and illustrates the history, art, culture, technology, and language of the Deaf community. The RIT Art Collection contains thousands of works showcasing RIT's visual arts curriculum.

=== Vignelli Center for Design Studies ===
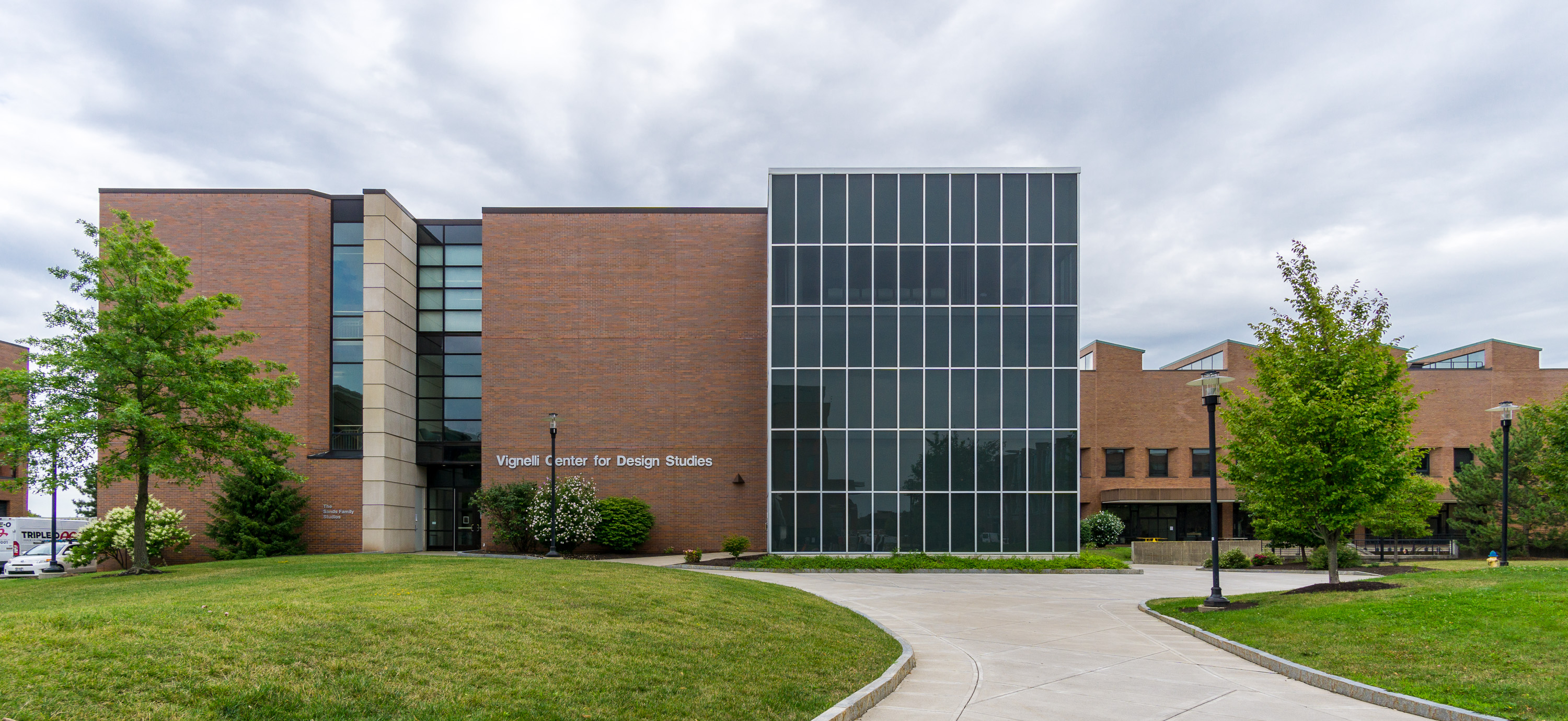
Vignelli Center for Design Studies is located in Booth Hall

The Vignelli Center for Design Studies was established in 2010 and houses the archives of Italian designers Massimo and Lella Vignelli. The center is a hub for design education, scholarship and research.

=== ESL Global Cybersecurity Institute ===
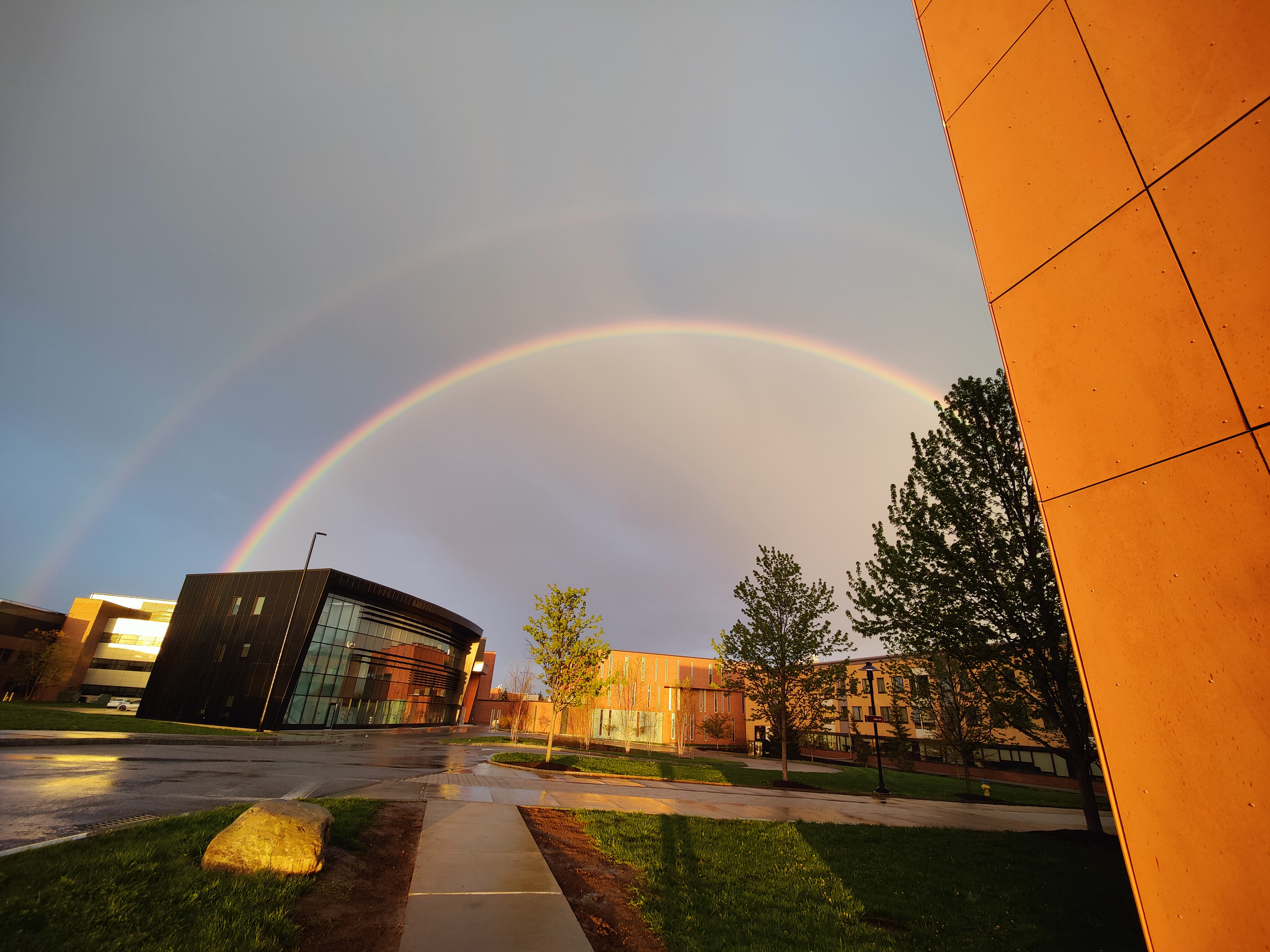
Cybersecurity Hall, attached to Golisano Hall, as seen from nearby Global Village

Founded in 2020, the Global Cybersecurity Institute was funded in part by a $50 million gift from RIT alumnus Austin McChord. The gift also funded four named endowments for students and cybersecurity researchers. In 2022, the Institute received a $3 million naming gift from ESL Federal Credit Union, a Rochester-area company that provides banking and wealth management services.

== Research ==
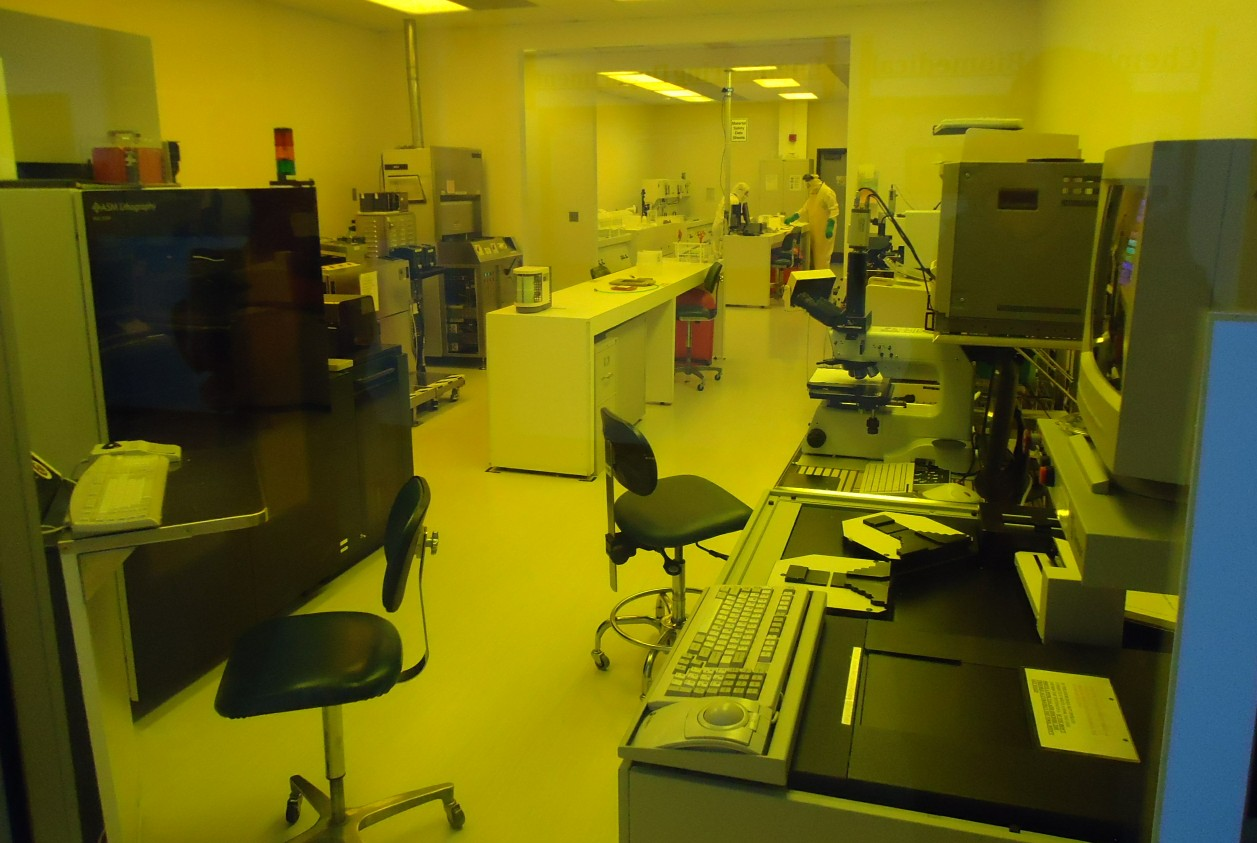
A look into the Semiconductor & Microsystems Fabrication Laboratory

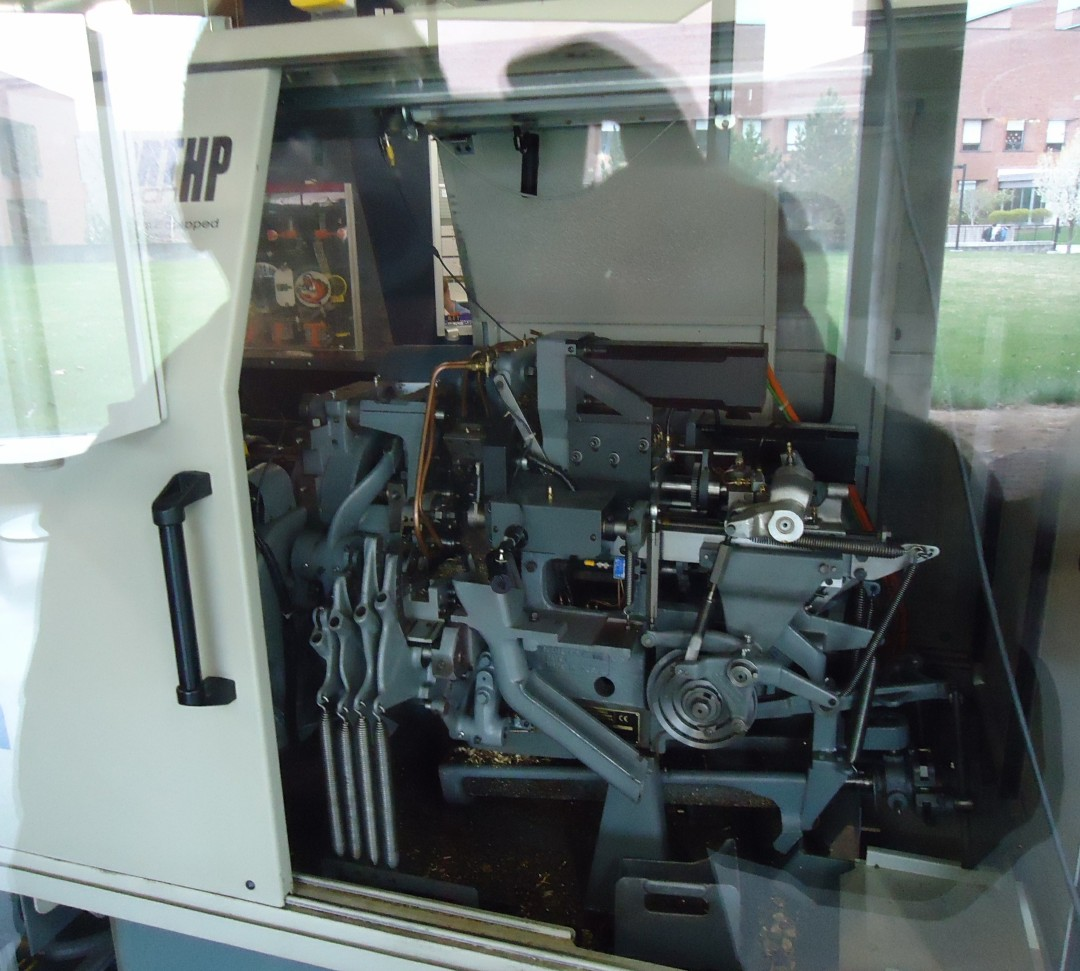
Corporations have donated machines and tools for students to study and improve

The total value of research grants to university faculty for fiscal year 2025 totaled $105 million. The university currently offers thirteen PhD programs: Imaging science, Microsystems Engineering, Computing and Information Sciences, Color science, Astrophysical Sciences and Technology, Sustainability, Electrical and Computer Engineering, Biomedical and Chemical Engineering, Business Administration, Physics, Mathematical Modeling, and Cognitive Science.

In 1986, RIT founded the Chester F. Carlson Center for Imaging Science, and started its first doctoral program in Imaging Science in 1989. The Imaging Science department also offers the only Bachelors (BS) and Masters (MS) degree programs in imaging science in the country. The Carlson Center features a diverse research portfolio; its major research areas include Digital Image Restoration, Remote Sensing, Magnetic Resonance Imaging, Printing Systems Research, Color Science, Nanoimaging, Imaging Detectors, Astronomical Imaging, Visual Perception, and Ultrasonic Imaging.

The Center for Advancing the Study of CyberInfrastructure (CASCI) is a multidisciplinary center housed in the College of Computing and Information Sciences. The Departments of Computer science, Software Engineering, Information technology, Computer engineering, Imaging Science, and Bioinformatics collaborate in a variety of research programs at this center. RIT was the first university to launch a Bachelor's program in Information technology in 1991, the first university to launch a Bachelor's program in Software Engineering in 1996, and was also among the first universities to launch a Computer science Bachelor's program in 1972. RIT helped standardize the Forth programming language, and developed the CLAWS software package.

RIT has collaborated with many industry players in the field of research as well, including IBM, Xerox, Rochester's Democrat and Chronicle, Siemens, NASA, and the Defense Advanced Research Projects Agency (DARPA). In 2005, it was announced by Russell W. Bessette, Executive Director New York State Office of Science Technology & Academic Research (NYSTAR), that RIT will lead the University at Buffalo and Alfred University in an initiative to create key technologies in microsystems, photonics, nanomaterials, and remote sensing systems and to integrate next generation IT systems. In addition, the collaboratory is tasked with helping to facilitate economic development and tech transfer in New York State. More than 35 other notable organizations have joined the collaboratory, including Boeing, Eastman Kodak, IBM, Intel, SEMATECH, ITT, Motorola, Xerox, and several Federal agencies, including as NASA.

In 2017, the U.S. Department of Energy selected RIT to lead its Reducing Embodied-Energy and Decreasing Emissions (REMADE) Institute aimed at forging new clean energy measures through the Manufacturing USA initiative.

In 2019, the university obtained Carnegie R2 status.

In 2026, the U.S. Department of the Army awarded RIT a cooperative agreement to establish and lead the Army STEM Education Consortium, a nationwide STEM education and workforce-development initiative serving students and educators from elementary school through postdoctoral study.

RIT began offering a Bachelor of Science degree in artificial intelligence in fall 2026, with the program combining programming, algorithmic principles, co-op, and specialized AI topics.

In June 2026, Jeff Harris and Joyce Pratt committed $24 million to support AI leadership, scholarships, and faculty endowments at RIT. The gift includes support for a Harris-Pratt Directorship for a planned AI institute expected to launch in early 2027.

The Strategic Framework outlines steps towards becoming a Carnegie R1 institution.

== Athletics ==
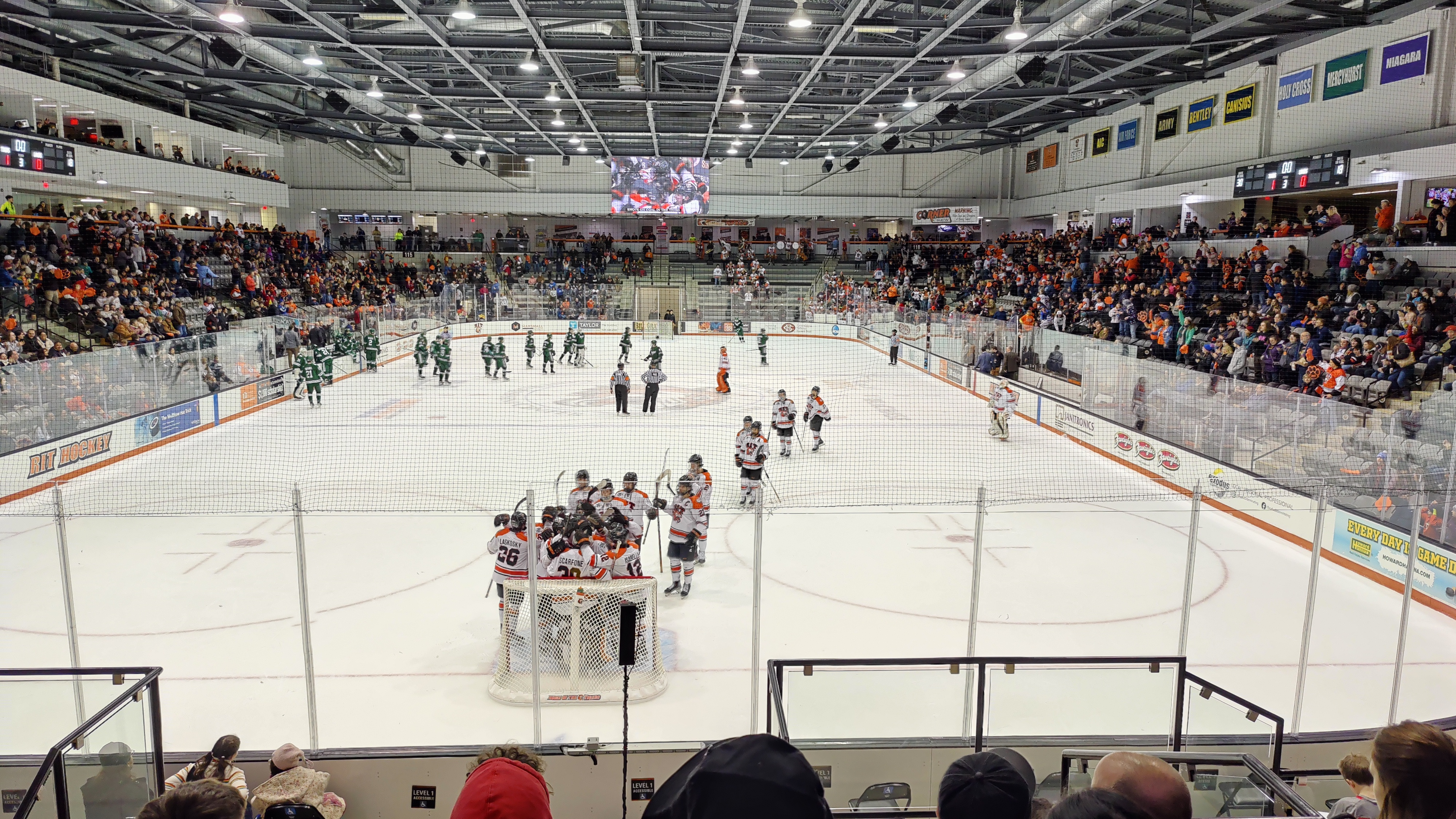
Gene Polisseni Center Interior

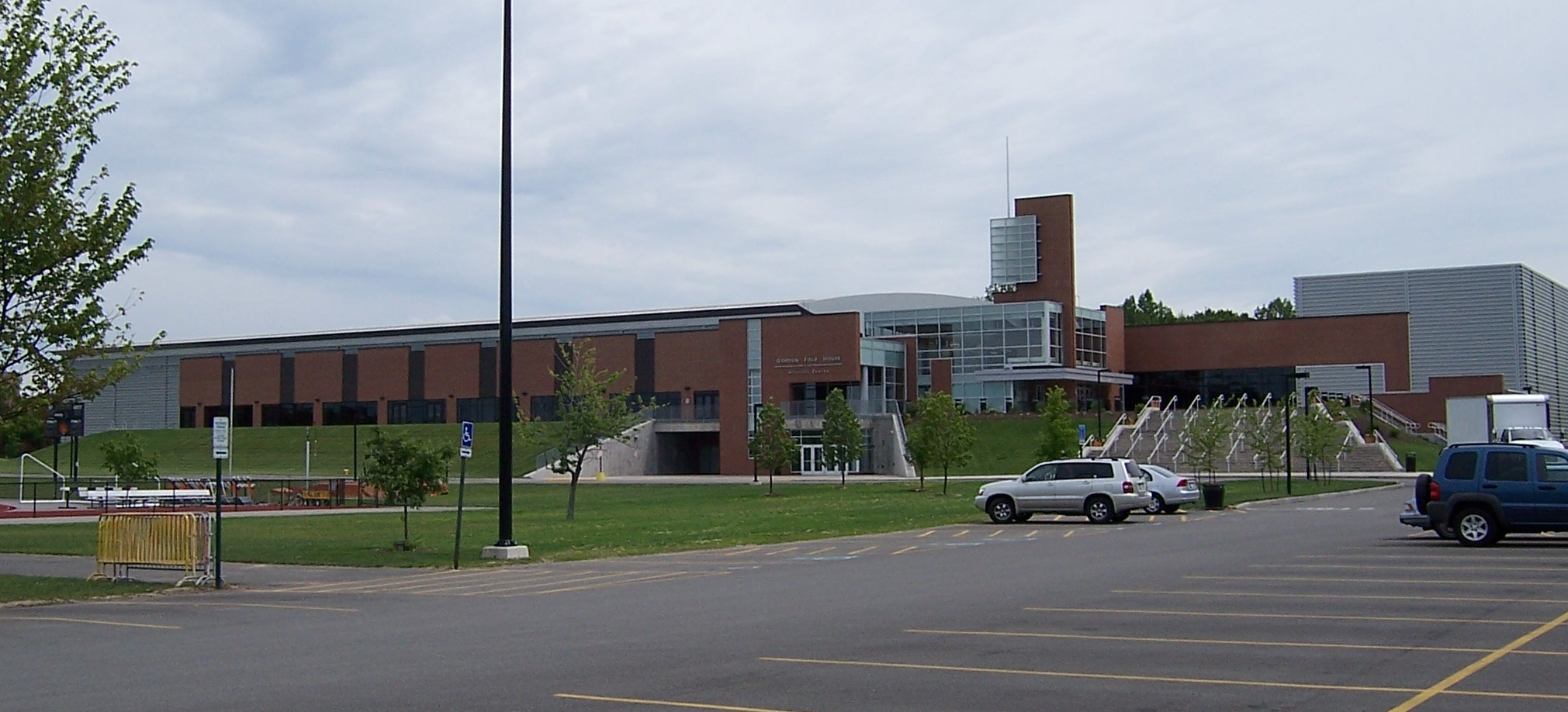
The Gordon Field House

RIT was a long-time member of the Empire 8, an NCAA Division III athletic conference, but moved to the Liberty League beginning with the 2011–2012 academic year. All of RIT's teams compete at the Division III level, with the exception of the men's and women's ice hockey programs. Those teams play at the Division I level in Atlantic Hockey America, formed after the 2023–24 season by the merger of the Tigers' former hockey homes of the men-only Atlantic Hockey Association and the women-only College Hockey America. In 2010, the men's ice hockey team was the first ever from the Atlantic Hockey Association to reach the NCAA tournament semi-finals: The Frozen Four.

In 2011–2012, the RIT women's ice hockey team had a regular season record of 28–1–1, and won the NCAA Division III national championship, defeating the defending champion Norwich University 4–1. The women's team had carried a record of 54–3–3 over their past two regular seasons leading up to that point. The women's hockey team then moved from Division III to Division I. Starting in the 2012–2013 season, the women's team played in the College Hockey America conference. In 2014–2015, the team became eligible for NCAA Division I postseason play.

In 2021, the RIT men's lacrosse team beat Salisbury in double overtime to take the NCAA Division III national championship. In 2022, the RIT men's lacrosse team won a second national title, following a 12–10 victory over Union College.

RIT's Alpine Ski Club competes at United States Collegiate Ski & Snowboard Association (USCSA), which uses NCAA II competition and academic standards. The varsity Alpine Ski Team competes at the USCSA Mid East Region.

Tom Coughlin, coach of the NFL's 2008 and 2012 Super Bowl champion New York Giants, taught physical education and was the head coach of the RIT Men's Varsity Football team for four seasons in the early 1970s. Overseeing RIT football's transition from a club sport to an NCAA Division III team, this was the first head coaching job of Coughlin's career with him calling his time at RIT "a great experience."

Since 1968 RIT's hockey teams played at Frank Ritter Memorial Ice Arena on campus. In 2010, RIT began raising money for a new arena. In 2011, B. Thomas Golisano and the Polisseni Foundation donated $4.5 million for the new arena, which came to be named the Gene Polisseni Center.

RIT opened Judson Stadium in 2026 as the home for its men's and women’s soccer and lacrosse programs, completing a five-year overhaul of the university's outdoor athletics facilities.

=== Mascot ===
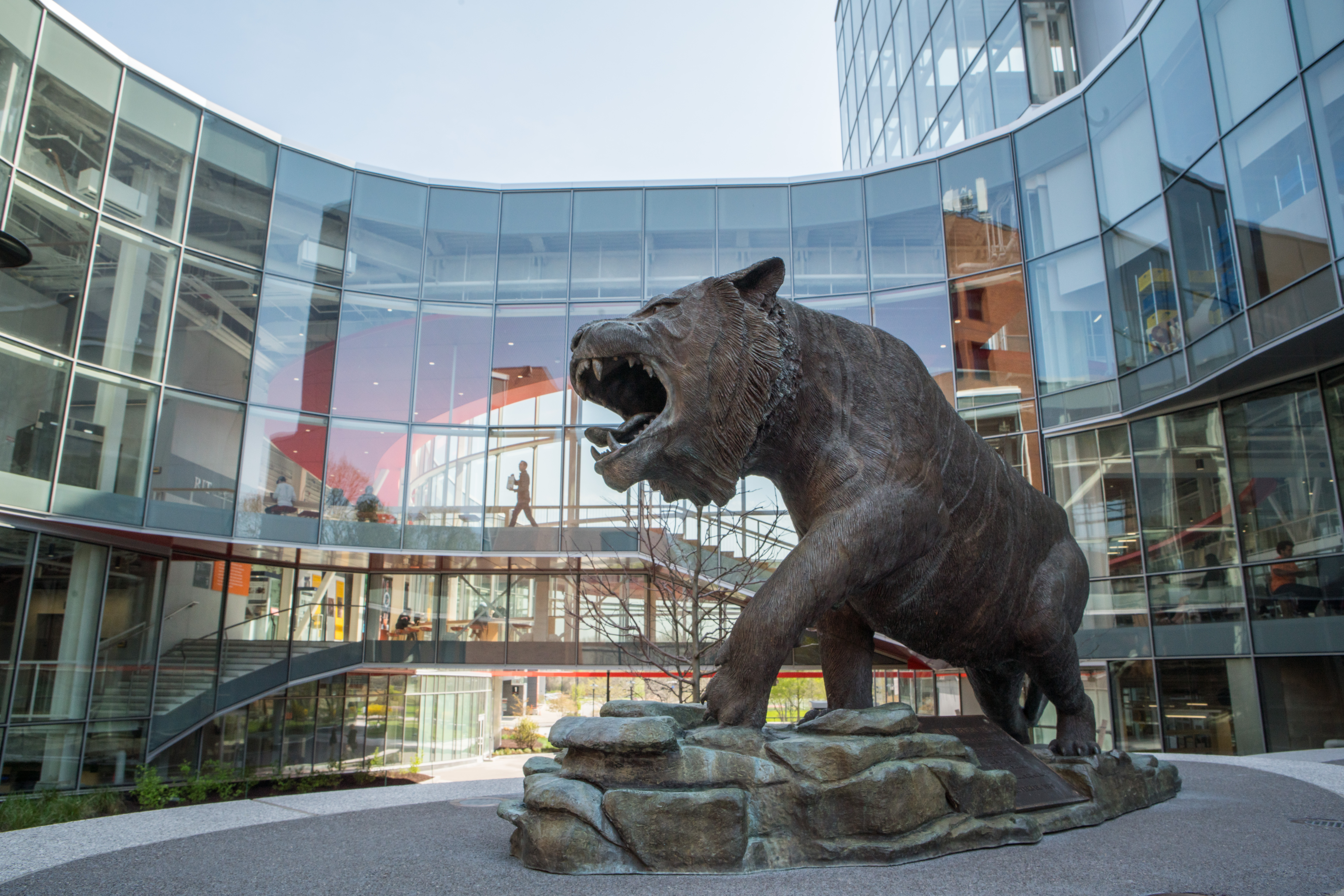
The RIT Tiger Statue now sits on the Quarter Mile outside the Student Hall for Exploration and Development

RIT's athletics nickname is the "Tigers", a name given following the undefeated men's basketball season of 1955–56.

The first ever mascot of RIT was a dog named "Brownie," a terrier that acted as the school's mascot during World War I. Later, RIT's athletic teams were called the "Techmen" and had blue and silver as the sports colors. In 1963, RIT students fundraised using ‘Tigershares’ to buy a rescued Bengal tiger cub that became the university's mascot, named SpiRIT which stands for Student Pride in RIT. Ambitious students were trained as the Tiger Cubs handlers and took him to most sport events until 1964. It was then discovered that the cub was ill and eventually he was put down due to these health complications. The original tiger's pelt now resides in the RIT Archive Collections at RIT Libraries. RIT helped the Seneca Park Zoo purchase a new tiger shortly after SpiRIT's death, but it was not used as a school mascot. A bronze sculpture by D.H.S. Wehle in the center of the Henrietta campus now provides an everlasting version of the mascot.

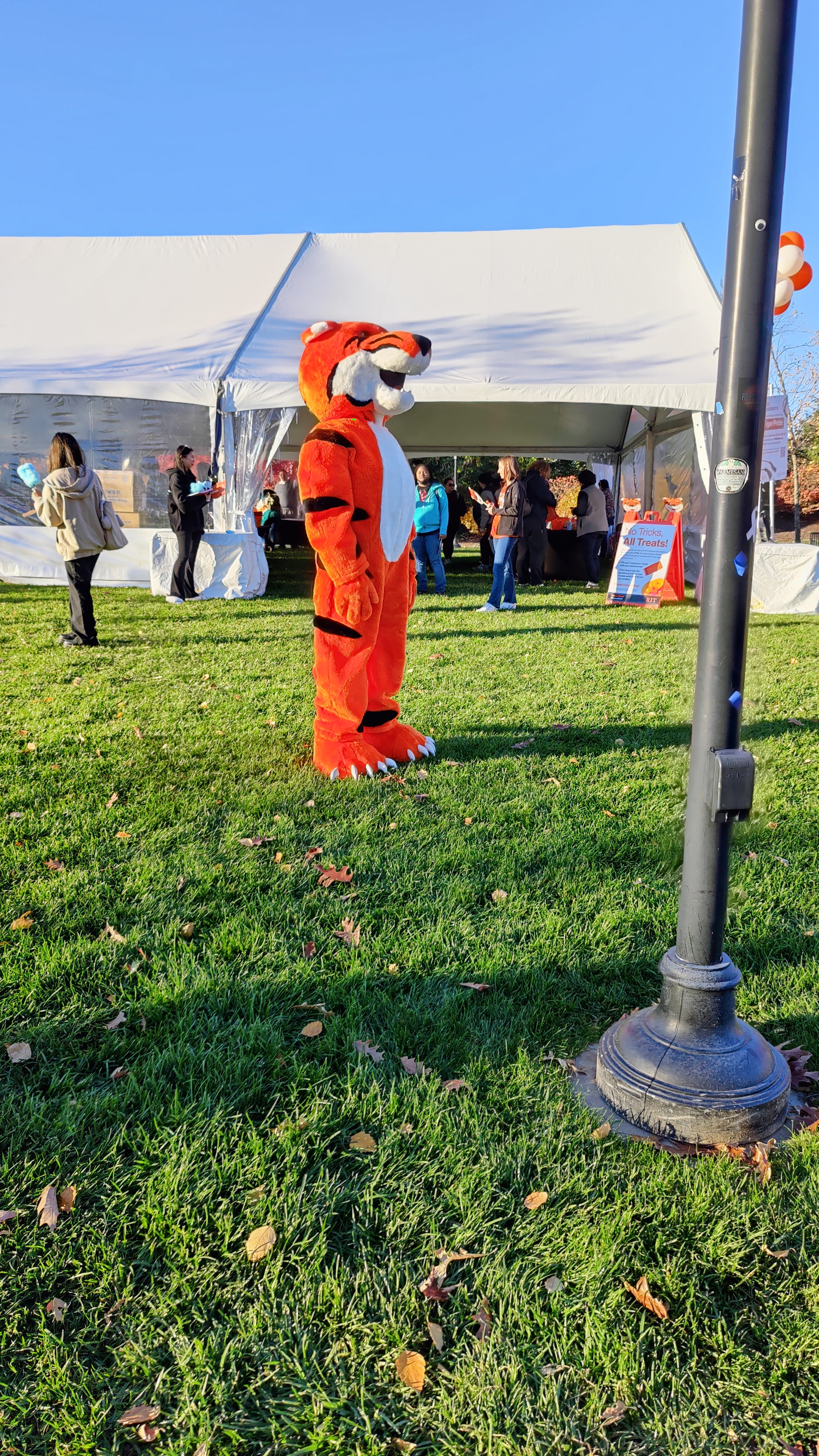
RITchie at an event in 2022

A costumed tiger mascot named RITchie was later introduced, appearing at a variety of campus events. The name was selected as part of a student contest in 1989.

== Student life ==
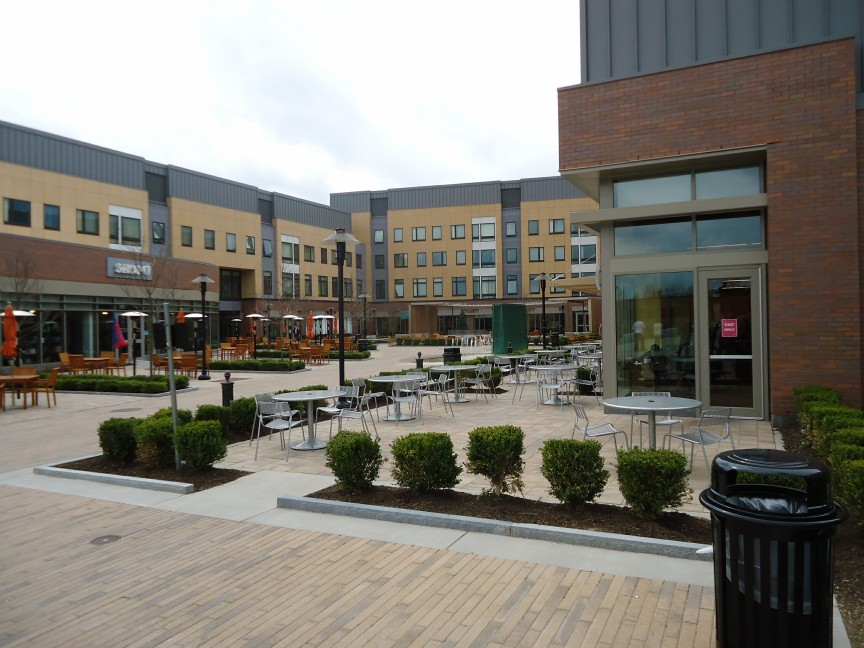
Global Village housing and student area.

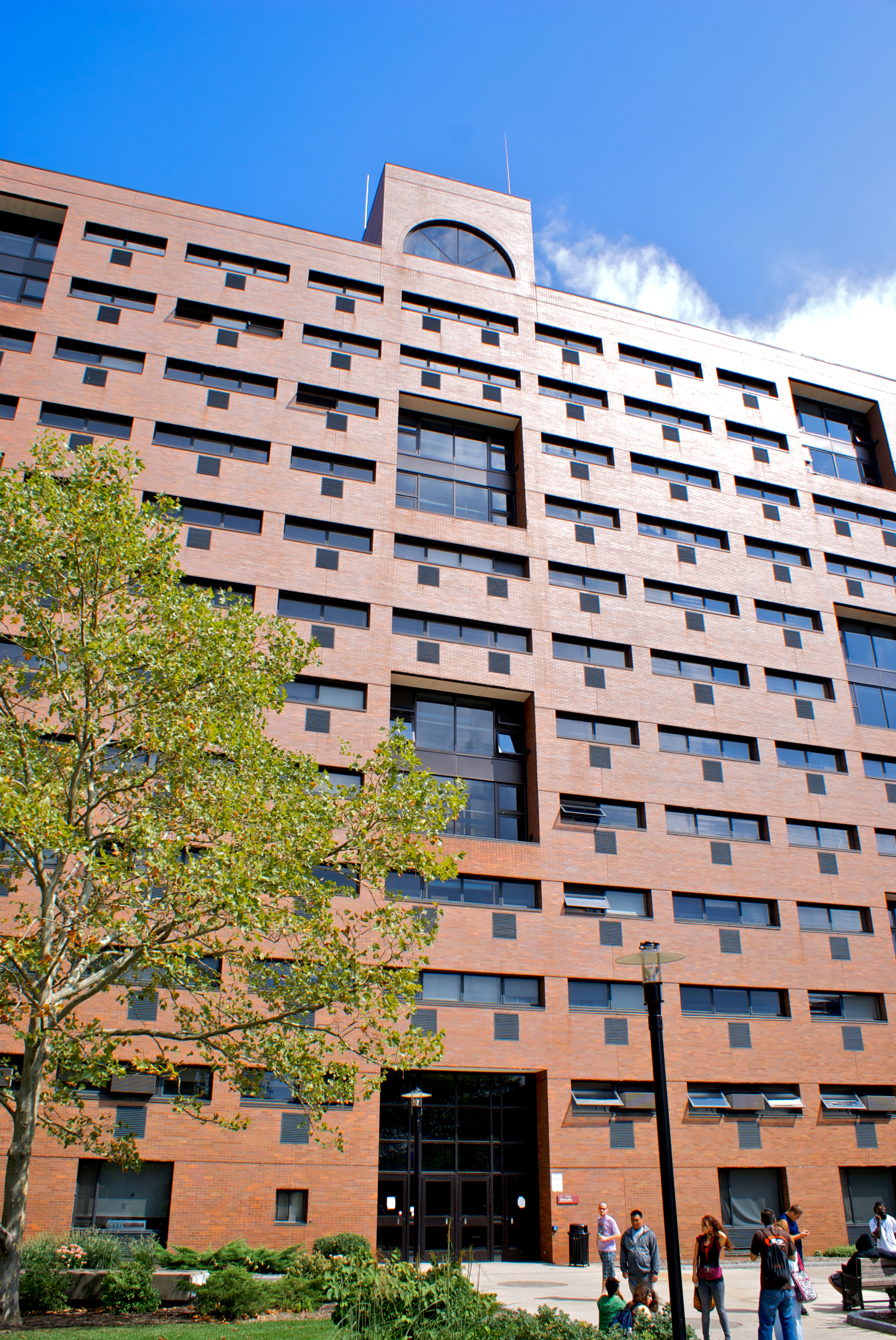
Ellingson Hall, RIT's tallest building

In addition to its academic and athletic endeavors, RIT has over 150 student clubs, 10 major student organizations, an interfaith center and 30 different Greek organizations.

Reporter magazine, founded in 1951, is the university's primary student-run magazine. RIT also has its own ambulance corps, RIT Sports Network athletics video production team and broadcast, pep band, radio station, and tech crew.

The university's Gordon Field House and Activities Center is home to competitive and recreational athletics and aquatics, a fitness center, and an auditorium hosting frequent concerts and other entertainment. Its opening in late 2004 was inaugurated by concerts by performers including Kanye West and Bob Dylan. It is the second-largest venue in Monroe County.

=== Deaf and Hard-of-Hearing students ===
One of RIT's unique features is the large presence of Deaf and Hard-of-Hearing students, who make up 8.8% of the student body. The National Technical Institute for the Deaf, one of RIT's nine colleges, provides interpreting and captioning services to students for classes and events. Many courses' lectures at RIT are interpreted into American Sign Language or captioned in real-time for the benefit of Hard-of-Hearing and Deaf students. There are several Deaf and Hard-of-Hearing professors and lecturers, too; an interpreter can vocalize their lectures for hearing students. This significant portion of the RIT population provides another dynamic to the school's diversity, and it has contributed to Rochester's high number of Deaf residents per capita.

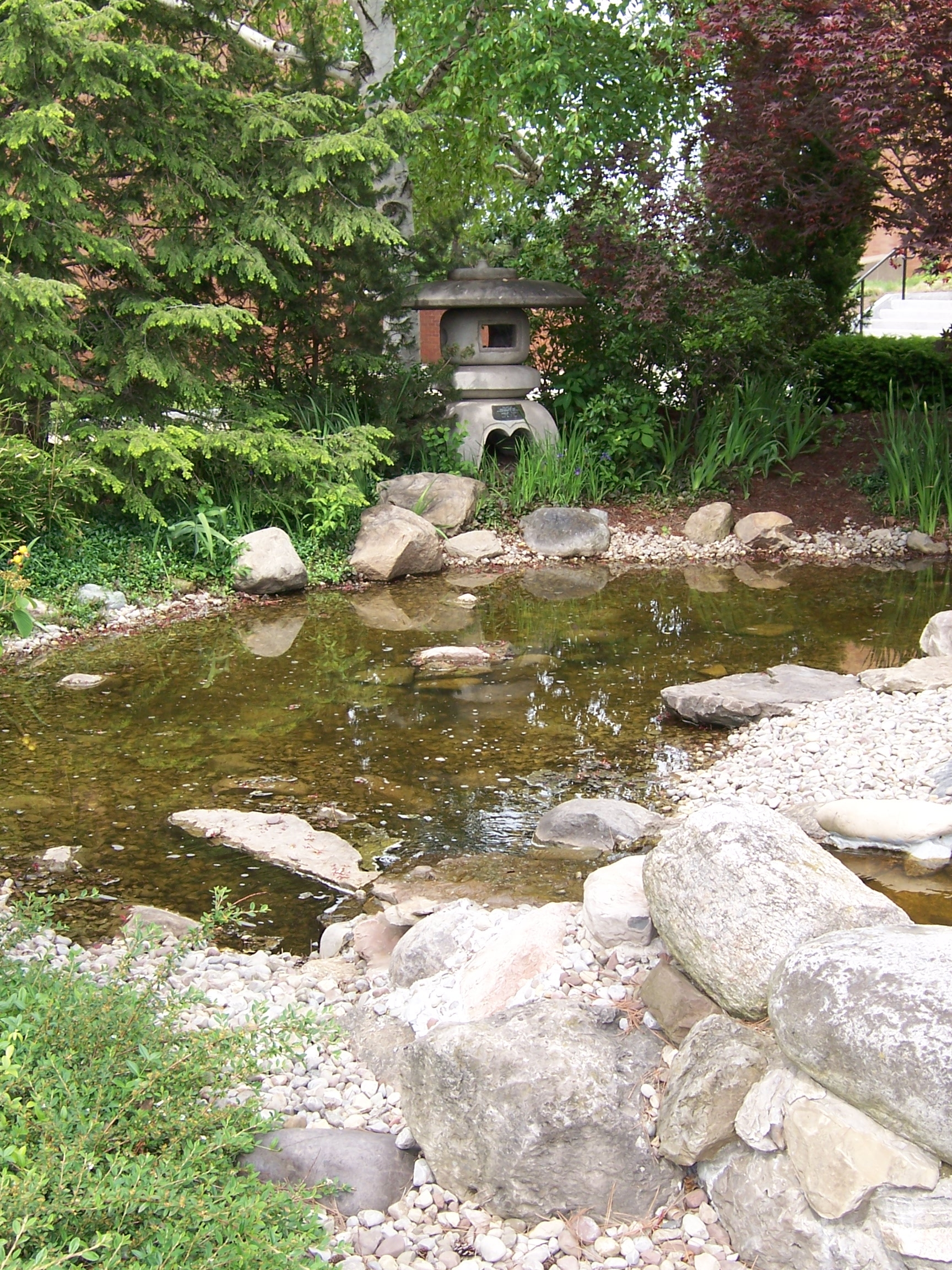
The Tojo Memorial Garden in the Eastman Kodak Quad

=== Fraternities and sororities ===
RIT's campus is host to thirty fraternities and sororities (eighteen fraternities and twelve sororities), that make up 6.5% of the total RIT population. RIT and Phi Kappa Psi alumni built six large buildings for Greek students on the academic side of campus next to the Riverknoll apartments.

=== Special Interest Houses ===
RIT's dormitories are home to five "Special Interest Houses" — Computer Science House, Engineering House, House of General Science, House of the Arts, and Unity House — that provide an environment to live immersed in a specific interest, such as art, engineering, or computing. Members of a special-interest house share their interests with each other and the rest of campus through academic focus and special activities. Special Interest Houses are self-governing and accept members based on their own criteria. In the early 2000s, RIT had a Special Interest House called "Business Leaders for Tomorrow", but it no longer exists. Prior to the 2022–2023 academic year, RIT had a Special Interest House called "International House", but it no longer exists. Prior to 2025, RIT had an "Art House" and a "Photo House". These two Special Interest Houses were merged to form House of the Arts.

=== ROTC programs ===
RIT is the host of the Air Force ROTC Detachment 538 "Blue Tigers" and the Army ROTC "Tiger Battalion". RIT students may also enroll in the Naval ROTC program based at the University of Rochester.

In 2009, the "Tiger Battalion" was awarded the Eastern Region's Outstanding ROTC Unit Award, given annually by the Order of the Founders and Patriots of America. In 2010, it was awarded the National MacArthur Award for 2nd Brigade.

=== Reporter Magazine ===
Reporter magazine (Reporter) is a completely student-run news organization. The physical magazine is a 24-page full-color issue distributed at the beginning of the month for the duration of the academic year, supplemented with regular online and social media content.

Reporter began as a newspaper in 1951 and changed to a magazine format in 1969 to better showcase the talents of students enrolled in programs at the College of Imaging Arts & Sciences. The first magazine issue was released on January 10, 1969. The magazine continued to be released on a weekly cycle until 2013, when it switched to a monthly cycle.

=== K2GXT – RIT Amateur Radio Club ===
RIT is home to the amateur radio club K2GXT. It is the oldest club on campus, founded in 1952 at the original downtown Rochester campus. The club maintains a UHF and VHF amateur radio repeater system operating on the 2 meter band, and the 70 centimeter band. The repeater system serves the campus and surrounding areas.

=== WITR 89.7 ===
An FM radio station run by students at RIT, WITR 89.7 broadcasts various music genres, RIT athletic events, and several talk radio programs.

=== College Activities Board ===
The College Activities Board, frequently abbreviated as CAB, is a student-run organization responsible for providing "diverse entertainment and activities to enhance student life on the RIT campus." CAB is responsible for annual concerts, class trips, movie screenings, and other frequent events.

=== Imagine RIT ===

An annual festival, publicized as "Imagine RIT", was initiated in May 2008 to showcase innovative and creative activity at RIT. It is one of the most prominent changes brought to RIT by former university president, William Destler.

An open event, visitors to Imagine RIT have an opportunity to tour the RIT campus and view new ideas for products and services, admire fine art, explore faculty and student research, examine engineering design projects, and interact with hundreds of hands-on exhibits. Theatrical and musical performances take place on stages in many locations on the RIT campus. Intended to appeal to visitors of all ages, including children, the festival features a variety of exhibits. More than 17,000 people attended the inaugural festival on May 3, 2008, and ten years later the number of people attending has doubled, reaching almost 35,000.

=== Rochester Game Festival ===
Sponsored by RIT's MAGIC Center, ROC Game Dev, and the Irondequoit Library, the Rochester Game Festival is an annual convention that showcases video games and tabletop games produced by students and by independent developers in the surrounding region. More than 1,300 people attended the festival in 2019.

=== RIT Ambulance ===
RIT Ambulance (RITA) is a community run, 9-1-1 dispatched New York State Certified Basic Life Support Ambulance agency.

=== Public Safety ===
RIT Public Safety is the primary agency responsible for the protection of students, staff, and property, as well as enforcement of both college policies and state laws. Officers are NYS Licensed Security Guards who possess an expanded scope of authority under NYS Education Law, and many Officers have prior law enforcement backgrounds. In 2016, it was announced that RIT Public Safety will deploy officers armed with long guns to respond to active shooter incidents. Public Safety Officers operate both a dispatch center and various types of patrol units on campus and at off-campus holdings (such as The Inn and Conference Center) and also manage the Call Box System. Activating a call box will automatically place the user in touch with an Officer in the dispatch center who will direct Patrol Officers to respond to the location; if necessary, Officers will summon the Monroe County Sheriff's to respond as well. As the college does not have 24/7 on campus crisis intervention counselors, in the event of a mental or behavioral health incident during hours where a counselor is not available, Public Safety Officers are also trained to act as mediators until an on-call counselor can be summoned.

=== Spiritual life ===
Schmitt Interfaith Center, located along the Quarter Mile, serves as the main spiritual focal point on campus. The Center provides office, meeting, lounge, kitchen, and worship space for some fifteen chaplaincies, including those within Buddhist; Christian; Hindu; Interfaith, Non-Religious, and Secular; Jewish; Muslim; and Pagan communities, and numerous student spiritual clubs.

There are two additional spaces on campus that serve Jewish students, including Hillel House and the Chabad House.

=== Dining services ===
RIT Dining Services manages a large number of restaurants and food shops, along with the sole dining hall on campus. There are multiple cafeterias and small retail locations throughout the campus, including near the Residence Halls, in the Student Alumni Union, Global Village, and in certain academic buildings. Dining Services at RIT is completely internal and run through the university. RIT Dining Services also provides opportunities for international students to work on campus. In early 2019 the campus started providing food from a Hydroponic farm on campus that supplied lettuce, kale, and other crops.

== Governance ==
RIT is governed under a shared governance model. The shared governance system is composed of the Student Government, the Staff Council, and the Academic Senate. The University Council brings together representatives from all three groups and makes recommendations to the president of the university. Once the University Council has made a recommendation, the president makes the final decision.

=== Student Government ===
The Student Government consists of an elected student senate and a cabinet appointed by the president and vice president. Elections for academic and community senators occur each spring, along with the elections for the president and vice president. The cabinet is appointed by the president and vice president.

The Student Government is an advocate for students and is responsible for basic representation as well as improving campus for students. The Student Government endorses proposal that are brought before the University Council.

=== Academic Senate ===
The Academic Senate is responsible for representing faculty within the shared governance system. The Academic Senate has 43 senators.

=== Staff Council ===
The Staff Council represents staff in the shared governance system.

== Notable alumni ==
RIT has over 154,000 alumni worldwide. Eleven RIT alumni, affiliates, and faculty members have been recipients of the Pulitzer Prize, winning a total of 15 prizes.

Notable alumni include Koo Kwang-mo, chairman and CEO of LG Corporation, Roman Yampolskiy, a computer scientist and leading researcher on AI safety and cybersecurity, Fredericka Douglass Sprague Perry, a philanthropist, a pioneer in the welfare of Black children, and the granddaughter of Frederick Douglass; Bob Duffy, former New York Lieutenant Governor; Tom Curley, former president and CEO of the Associated Press; Daniel Carp, former chairman of the Eastman Kodak Company; John Resig, software developer and creator of jQuery; N. Katherine Hayles, critical theorist; Austin McChord, founder and CEO of Datto; Jack Van Antwerp, former director of photography for The Wall Street Journal; Adam Kubert, artist known for his work with Marvel Comics; and photojournalist Bernie Boston, and Steve Matteson, the designer of popular typefaces Curlz and Open Sans.

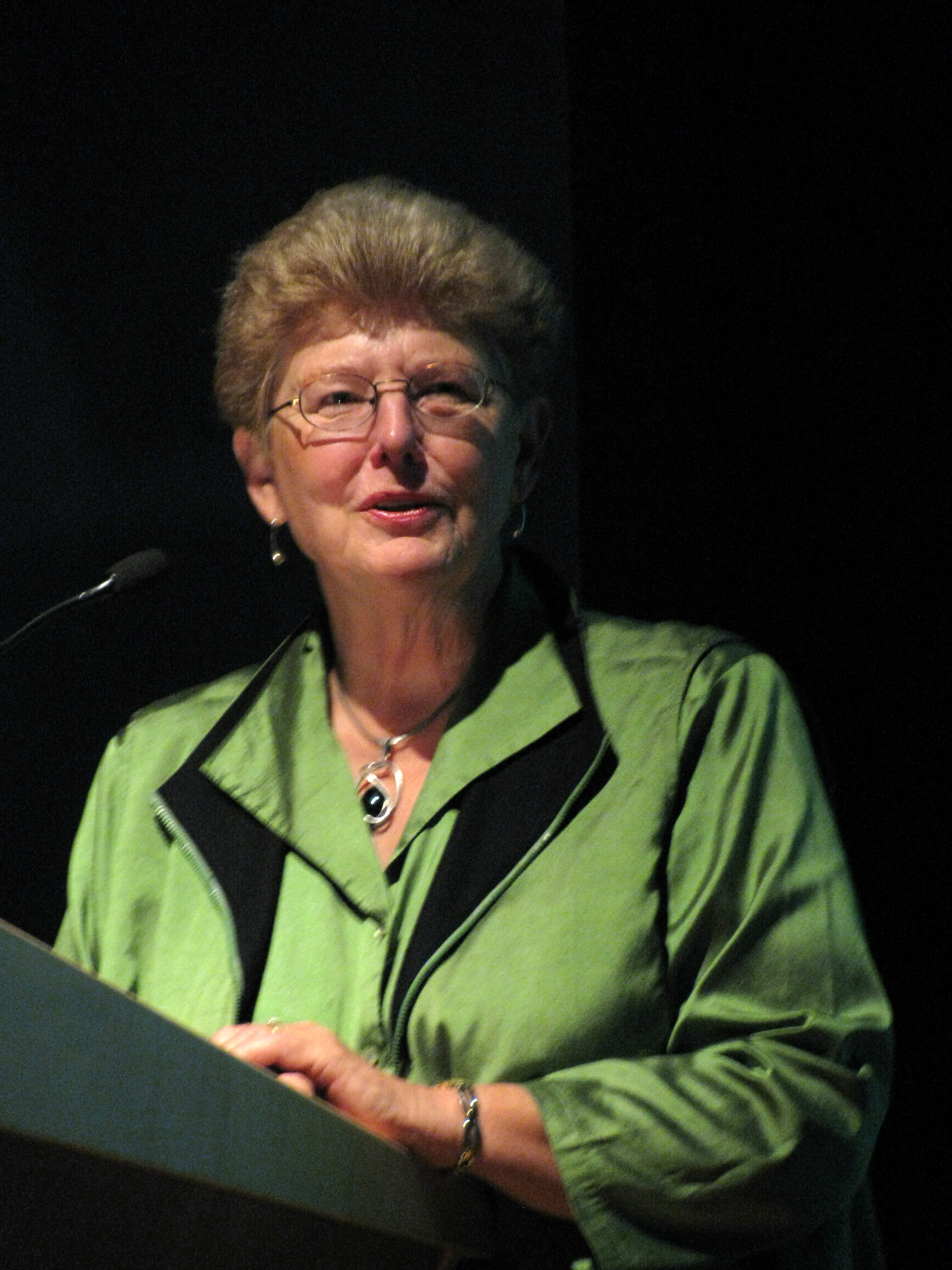
Katherine Hayles; James B. Duke Distinguished Professor Emerita of Literature at Duke University. (BS 1966)

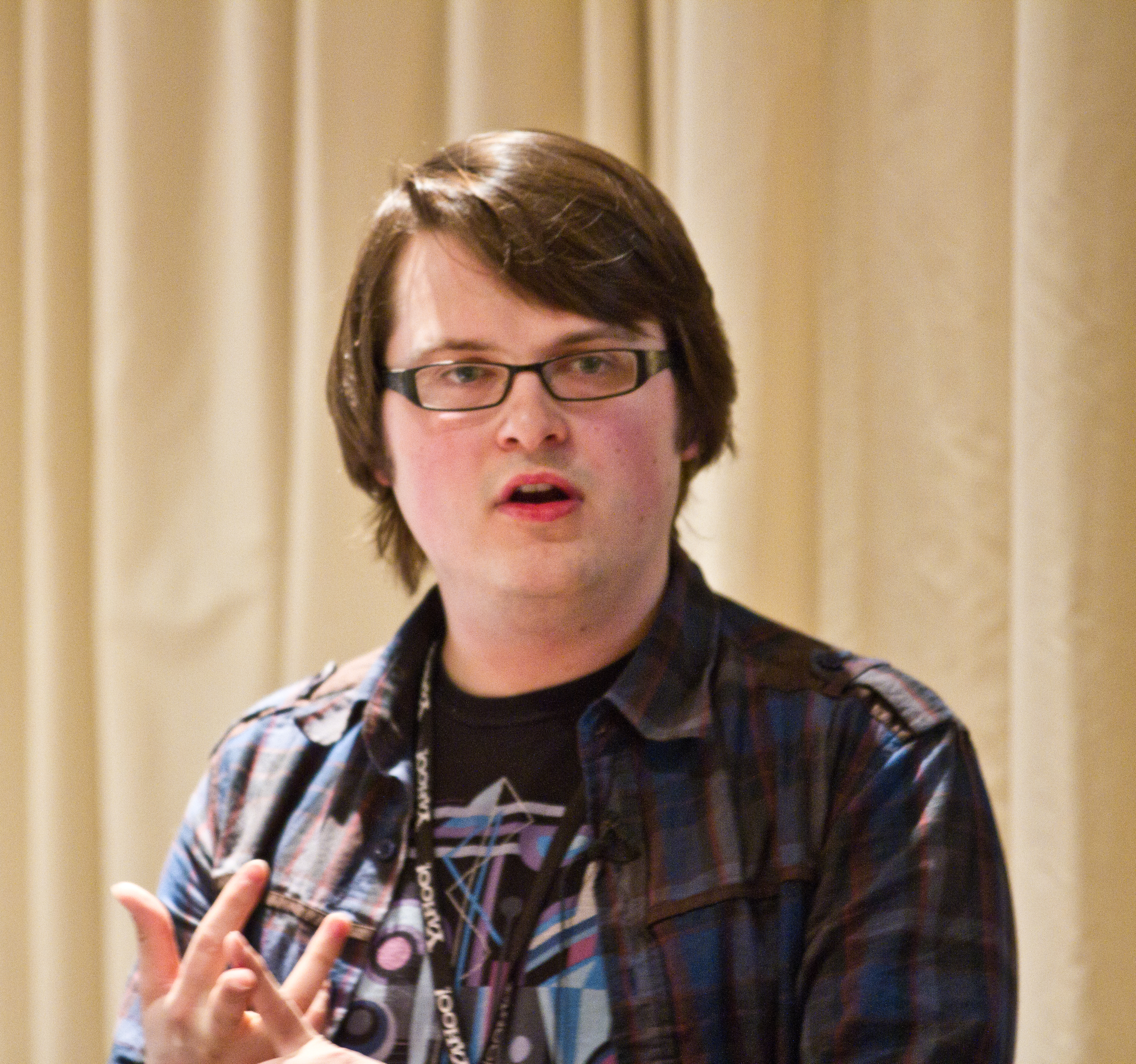
John Resig; Chief software architect at Khan Academy. (BS 2009)

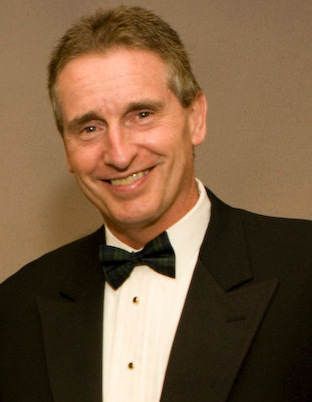
Robert J. Duffy; Lieutenant governor of New York from 2011 to 2014 and the 65th mayor of Rochester, New York, from 2006 to 2010. (BS 1993)

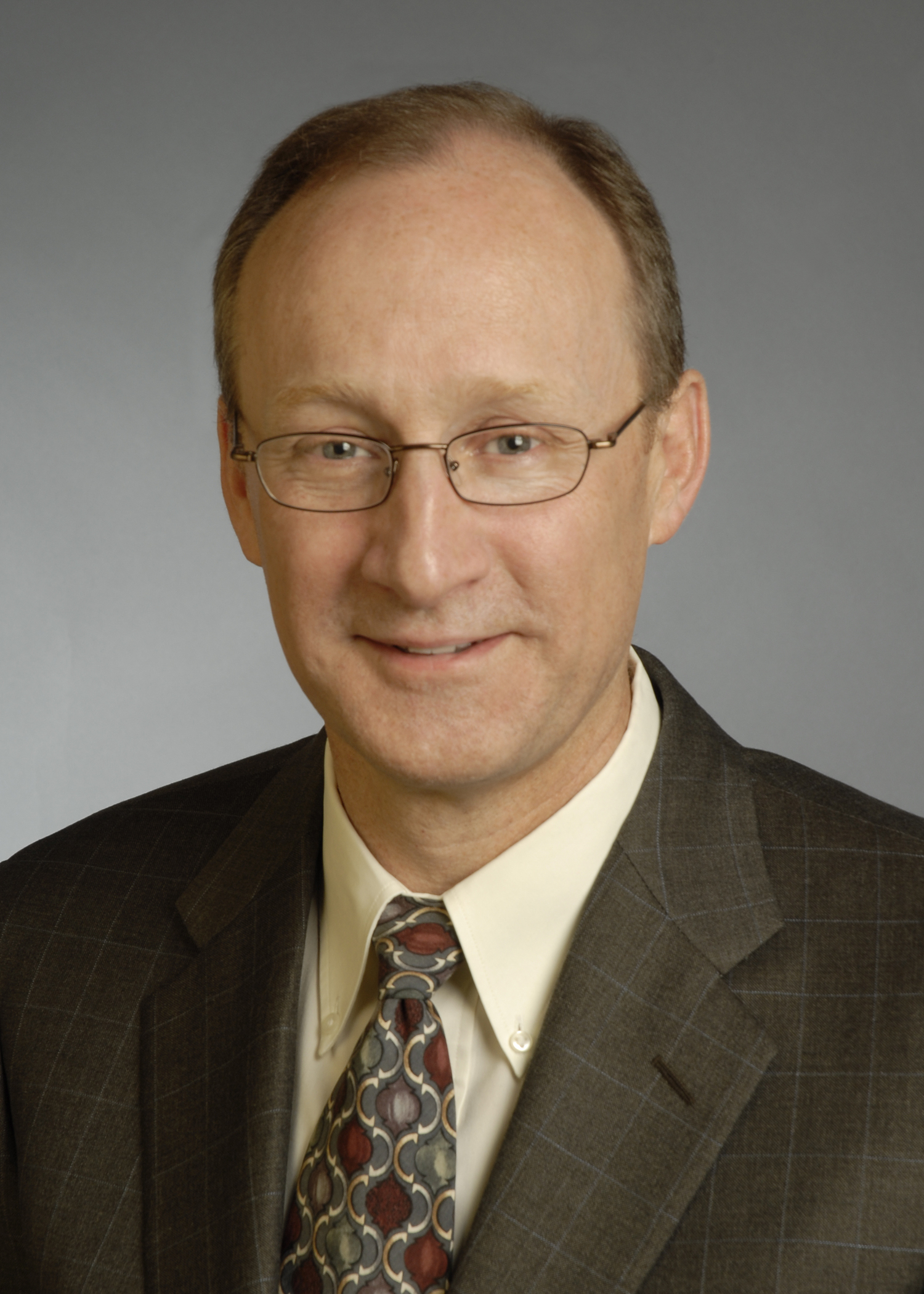
Steven Van Slyke; Invented organic light-emitting diode. (MS)

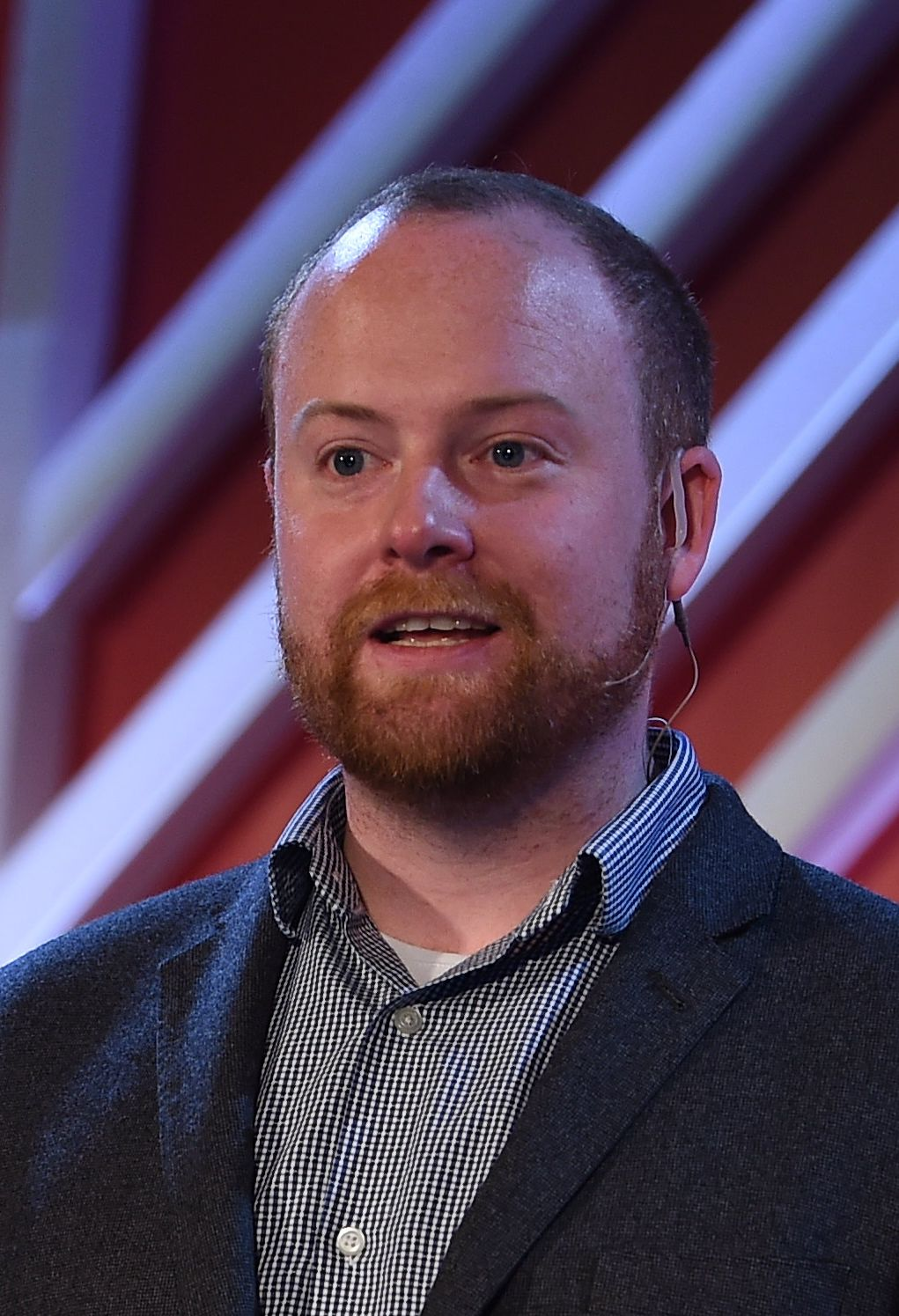
Austin McChord; Founder and CEO of Datto. (BS)

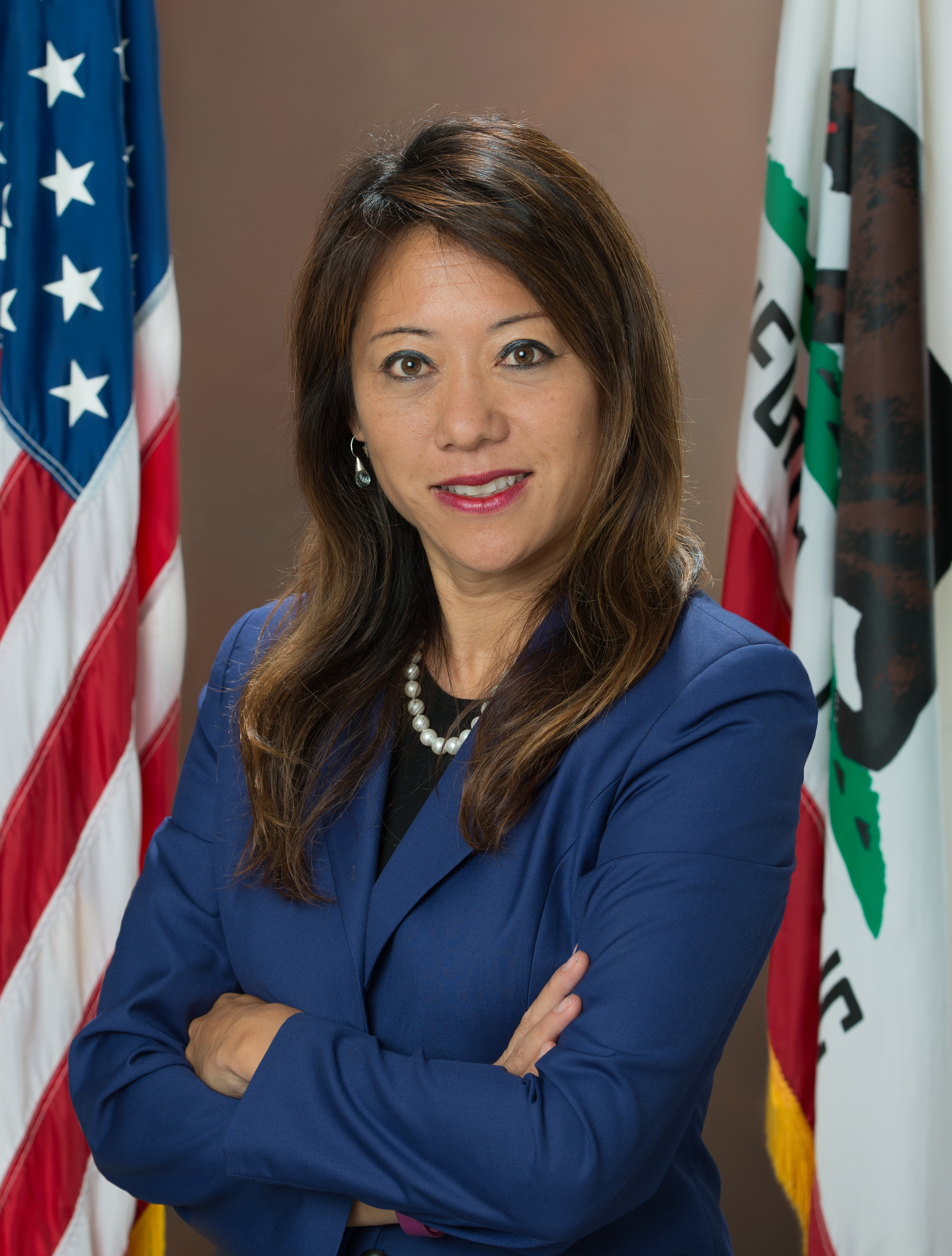
Fiona Ma; California State Treasurer since January 2019. (BS)

== Presidents and provosts ==
In the decades prior to the selection of RIT's first president, the university was administered primarily by the board of trustees.

Please see List of presidents of the Rochester Institute of Technology for list of presidents.

University provosts
| No. | Name | Term start | Term end | Ref. |
|---|---|---|---|---|
| 1 | Todd H. Bullard | August 1, 1970 | Summer 1980 | |
| 2 | Robert G. Quinn | June 1981 | January 1983 | |
| 3 | Thomas R. Plough | Spring 1984 | July 1994 | |
| interim | Stanley D. McKenzie | July 1994 | November 1995 | |
| 4 | Stanley D. McKenzie | November 1995 | June 30, 2008 | |
| 5 | Jeremy A. Haefner | July 1, 2008 | June 30, 2018 | |
| 6 | Ellen M. Granberg | August 19, 2018 | June 30, 2023 | |
| 7 | Prabu David | August 1, 2023 | present | |

In addition to the ten official presidents, Provost Thomas R. Plough served as acting president twice: once, in February 1991 when M. Richard Rose was on sabbatical with the CIA, and again in 1992 between Rose's retirement and Albert J. Simone's installation.

== See also ==
- Association of Independent Technological Universities
- List of Rochester Institute of Technology alumni
- RIT Tigers
