= Rochester Area Colleges =

The Rochester Area Colleges is a consortium of higher education institutions in the Rochester, New York metropolitan area in the United States. Founded in 1970, Rochester Area Colleges has numerous area public and private colleges as members and provides collaborative working opportunities for colleges and their students. The association aims to support career development, placement, and experiential education in the region. The University of Rochester is generally regarded as the premier institution within the consortium.

The consortium consists of:

- Alfred State College
- Alfred University
- Finger Lakes Community College
- Genesee Community College
- Houghton University
- Keuka College
- Monroe Community College
- Nazareth University
- Roberts Wesleyan University (incl. Northeastern Seminary)
- Rochester Institute of Technology
- St. John Fisher University
- SUNY Brockport
- State University of New York at Geneseo
- University of Rochester
