= Golisano College of Computing and Information Sciences =

Computing school at Rochester Institute of Technology

B. Thomas Golisano College of Computing and Information Sciences
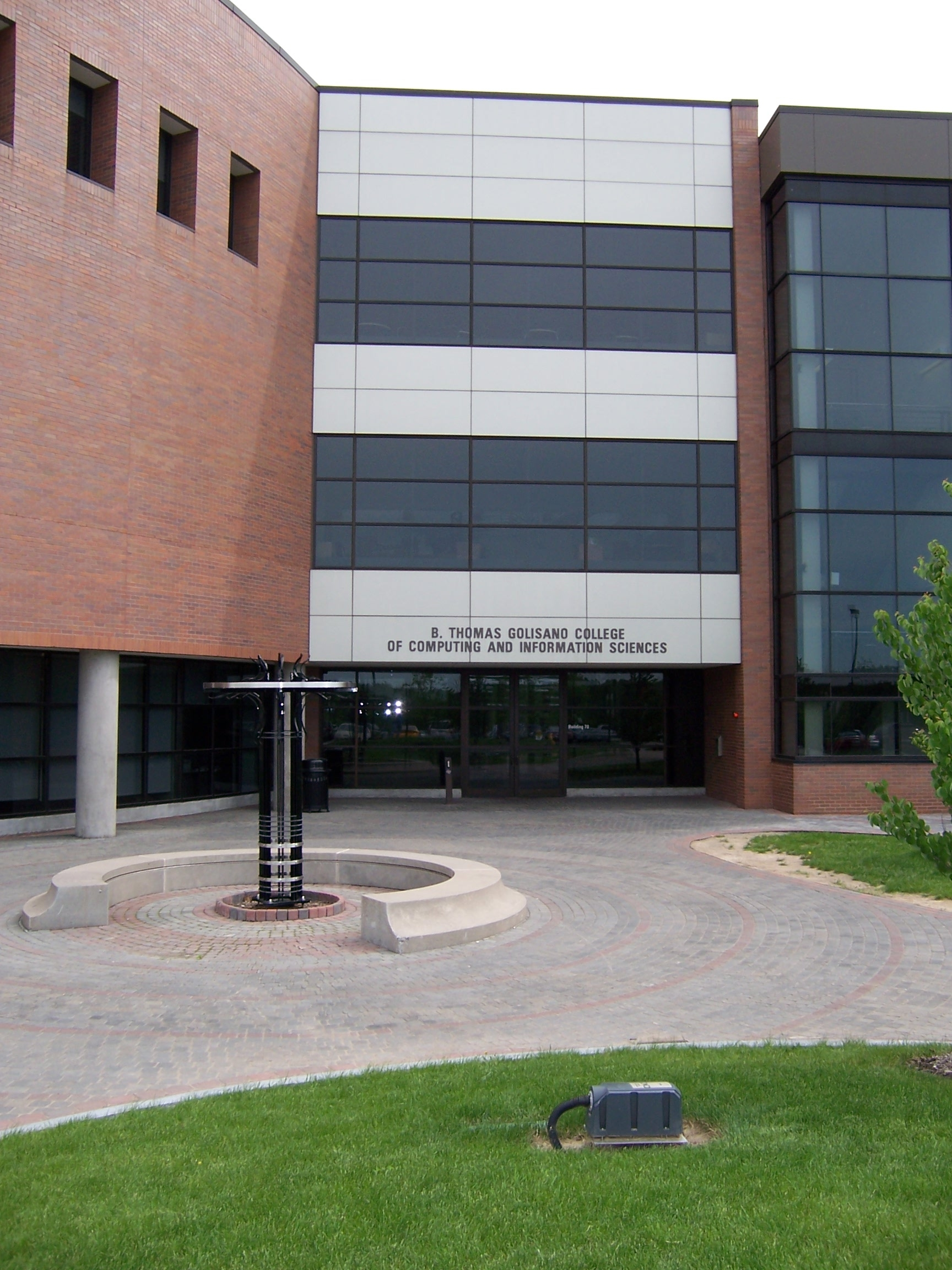
- Established: July 1, 2001; 25 years ago
- Location: Rochester, New York
- Website: www.rit.edu/computing/

The B. Thomas Golisano College of Computing and Information Sciences (commonly abbreviated as GCCIS and pronounced jee-sis) is one of the largest colleges at the Rochester Institute of Technology (RIT), and is home to the institute's computing education and research facilities. Golisano College is home to RIT's computer science, cybersecurity, information sciences and technologies, and software engineering departments, as well as the Ph.D. program in computing and information sciences, and the School of Interactive Games & Media, home to the college's game design and development and new media interactive development programs. Golisano College is housed in a 125,000 square foot facility, opened in 2003 on RIT's campus in Rochester, New York.

== History ==
In 1972, RIT began offering one of its first computer science programs. Originally named computer systems, the program offered students the opportunity to earn a bachelor of technology degree. In 1996, RIT introduced an undergraduate program in software engineering, one of the first programs of its kind. Later, in 2003, the software engineering program would become one of the first such programs to receive ABET accreditation.

In the late 1990s, the dean of RIT's College of Applied Science and Technology, made a proposition to create a new college that would focus on the growing fields of computer science, information technology and software engineering. In February 2001, B. Thomas Golisano, chairman and CEO of Paychex, donated $14 million to fund the college's creation. The college was founded on July 1, 2001 and officially opened in May 2003. The first dean of the college was Jorge Díaz Herrera.

In 2005, former President Bill Clinton visited the college following an invitation from B. Thomas Golisano. He toured the facilities and gave a speech to students.

In 2012, Andrew Sears became the second dean of the college.

In 2012, the college introduced its computing security department, dedicated to the increasing importance of protecting computing devices and computer data.

In 2015, Anne Haake was named dean of the college, and Andrew Sears became dean of the College of Information Sciences and Technology at Penn State.

In 2022, Matt Huenerfauth was named the 4th dean of the college.

In 2023, the college opened its Cybersecurity Clinic within the ESL Global Cybersecurity Institute with support from the Google Cybersecurity Clinics Fund. The Clinic provides pro bono cybersecurity services to community organizations while providing hands-on experiences for students.

== Facilities ==
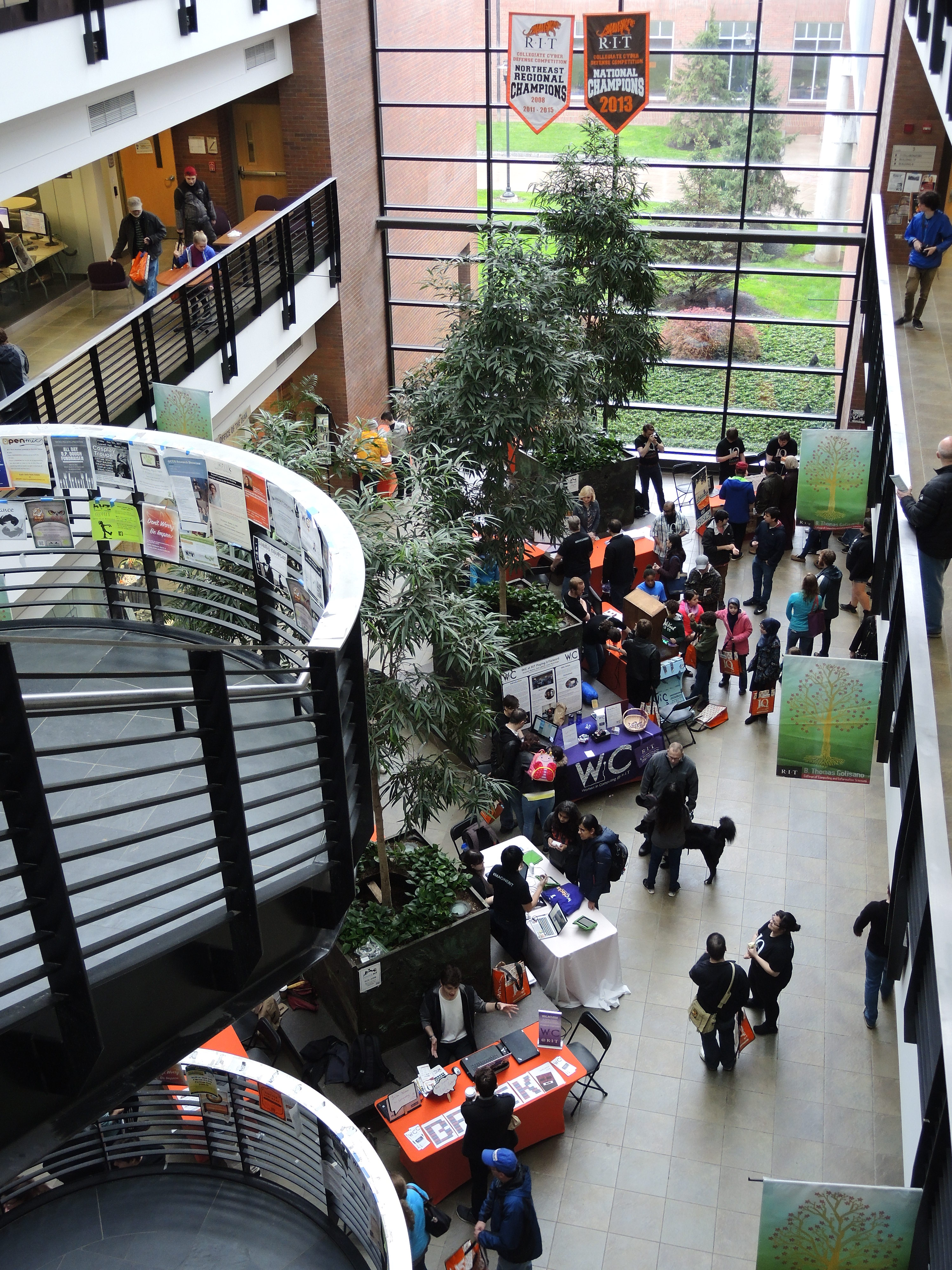
Atrium full of visitors at Imagine RIT 2017

The Golisano College is housed within a three-floor, 126,500 sq. ft. facility that features three cube sculptures created by famed artist Harry Bertoia, that house trees that stretch up through the atrium. There are 13 classrooms, 12 studio teaching labs, and 16 dedicated labs at the college, offering access to the study of every major computing platform. The college's dedicated Security Lab is isolated from the rest of the campus's networks to allow the in-depth study of viruses, firewalls, and other computer vulnerabilities. Additional labs include an Entertainment Lab for 3D modeling, game and interactive media development; a Mobile Computing and Robotics Lab for the research and development of portable devices; and an Artificial Intelligence lab dedicated to the understanding of human reactions and processing. The College also features its own deli, Ctrl-Alt-Deli.

In 2020, the college opened the ESL Global Cybersecurity Institute (ESL GCI), a hub for research and training in cybersecurity and artificial intelligence. The Institute is home to a Cyber Range capable of replicating realistic threat scenarios on scales mirroring global organizations that is used for training students, companies, government and the military. Until 2026, the ESL GCI played host to the Global Finals of the Collegiate Penetration Testing Competition.

The Institute was made possible by a gift from RIT alumnus Austin McChord, the founder of Datto.

== Awards and recognition ==
- In 2013, the college's cyber defense team won the National Collegiate Cyber Defense Competition.
- In 2021, the college's offensive cybersecurity team won the Collegiate Penetration Testing Competition Global Finals.
- In 2026, the School of Interactive Games & Media's game design and development programs at both the bachelor's and master's levels were ranked fourth in the nation by the Princeton Review.
- The college has been named a National Center of Academic Excellence in Information Assurance Education by the U.S. Department of Homeland Security, National Security Agency, and the Information Assurance Directorate.

== Notable alumni ==
- Alex Kipman (2001), primary inventor of Microsoft HoloLens and Kinect for Xbox 360
- Elan Lee (1998), creator of Exploding Kittens
- Katie Linendoll (2005), Emmy-award winning TV personality and tech expert
- John Resig (2006), creator of jQuery
