= List of Alpha Phi Omega members =

Alpha Phi Omega is an international service fraternity. Most chapters are in the United States, with most of the remainder in the Philippines. The following list includes Alpha Phi Omega members of U.S. chapters who are notable or have attained high-ranking positions in their particular career field. Notable alumni include individuals who joined Alpha Phi Omega chapters as students and advisors who are members of the faculty, staff, Scouting, or the community, selected by a chapter to advise them. An honorary member refers to individuals offered honorary membership in either various Alpha Phi Omega chapters or nationally, as non-students.

== Academia ==
Name	Original chapter	Notability	Ref.
Wilford S. Bailey	Delta (Honorary)	President of Auburn University	
David Beckley	Psi Lambda	President of Rust College	
K. Roald Bergethon	Alpha (Honorary)	President of Lafayette College (1958-1978)	
Daniel Bernian	Lambda Pi	President of La Salle University (1958-1969)	
Harold L. Bevis	Alpha Iota (Honorary)	7th President of Ohio State University and member of Ohio Supreme Court	
Ward Gray Biddle	(Honorary)	Vice President of Indiana University, member Indiana House of Representatives 1931-1931, member Indiana Senate 1933–1937.	
John Bonvillian	Theta Advisor	Professor at University of Virginia	
George W. Bowman	Epsilon Psi (Honorary)	President of Kent State University (1944–1963).	
John Gabbert Bowman	Beta	Tenth Chancellor (1921–1945) of the University of Pittsburgh and the ninth President (1911–1914) of the University of Iowa	
Walter Brasch	Alpha Delta	social issues journalist and university professor of journalism.	
Dean L. Bresciani	Xi Delta (Honorary)	14th president of North Dakota State University	
Clifton D. Bryant		Professor of Sociology at Virginia Tech	
Edward B. Bunn	Mu Alpha (Honorary)	President of Loyola University Maryland (1938-1947); president of Georgetown University (1952–1964); chancellor of Georgetown University (1964–1972)	
Curley Byrd	Epsilon Mu (Honorary)	President of University of Maryland, College Park (1936–1954)	
Harold C. Case	Zeta Upsilon (Honorary)	President of Boston University (1950–1967)	
John E. Champion		President of Florida State University (1965-1969)	
Edward F. Clark	Omicron Sigma (Honorary)	President of Saint Peter's College, New Jersey (1960–1965)	
Wat Tyler Cluverius Jr.	Sigma	Survivor of sinking of the USS Maine; Rear Admiral United States Navy; president of Worcester Polytechnic Institute (1939–1953).	
Walter Coffey	Gamma Psi (Honorary)	President of University of Minnesota (1941–1945)	
Arthur Compton	Alpha Phi (Honorary)	Recipient of the Nobel Prize in Physics (1927) and chancellor of Washington University in St. Louis (1946–1953)	
John E. Corbally	Gamma Alpha	Chancellor of Syracuse University (1969–1971), president of University of Illinois System (1971–1979), president of MacArthur Foundation (1979–1989)	
George L. Cross	Delta Beta (Honorary)	President of University of Oklahoma (1943–1968)	
Robert Crouch	Delta Psi	President of Rutledge College (1979)	
Allan Cullimore	Lambda Delta Advisor	President of the New Jersey Institute of Technology	
Harrison C. Dale	Gamma Nu (Honorary)	President of the University of Idaho (1937–1946)	
John J. DeGioia	Mu Alpha (Honorary)	President of Georgetown University	
George W. Diemer	Beta Kappa Advisor	President of Central Missouri State College (1937–1956)	
Grover C. Dillman	(Honorary)	President of Michigan Technological University (1935–1956)	
Quincy Doudna		President of Eastern Illinois University (1956–1971)	
Roy Ellis	Beta Mu (Honorary)	President Missouri State University (1926–1961)	
Milton S. Eisenhower		President of Kansas State University, Pennsylvania State University, and Johns Hopkins University	
Wilson Homer Elkins	Alpha Rho, Epsilon Mu	President of University of Maryland, College Park (1954–1978)	
John R. Emens	Delta Xi (Honorary)	President of Ball State University (1945–1968)	
Francis D. Farrell	Pi (Honorary)	President of Kansas State University (1925–1943)	
Steve A. Favors	Beta Delta Advisor	President of Grambling State University (1998–2001)	
Charles Wesley Flint	Phi Advisor	American Bishop in the Methodist Church, elected in 1936; president of Cornell College (1915–1922); Chancellor of Syracuse University (1922–1936)	
John Huston Finley	Unknown (Honorary)	President of the City College of New York, Commissioner of Education of the State of New York	
William C. Friday	Rho (Honorary)	President of the University of North Carolina System (1956–1986)	
Clifford C. Furnas	Unknown (Honorary)	Olympic athlete, president of SUNY Buffalo	
Eugene Garbee	Mu Rho Advisor	President of Upper Iowa University (1952–1970)	
Harrell E. Garrison	Beta Nu (Honorary)	President Northeastern State University	
Charles Glassick	Iota Omicron (Honorary)	President of Gettysburg College (1977–1988).	
Marvin Goldfried	Gamma Iota)	American psychologist and retired distinguished professor of clinical psychology at Stony Brook University	
Wallace Graves	Xi Nu (Honorary)	President of University of Evansville 1967–1987	
David M. Gring	Alpha Beta Psi (Honorary)	President of Roanoke College, 1989–2004	
José Ángel Gutiérrez	Delta Chi	Attorney and professor at the University of Texas at Arlington, founding member of the Mexican American Youth Organization (MAYO) in San Antonio in 1967, and a founding member and past president of the Raza Unida Party	
T. Marshall Hahn		President of Virginia Polytechnic Institute from 1962 to 1974 and CEO of Georgia-Pacific from 1983 to 1993	
John A. Hannah	Beta Beta	President of Michigan State University (1941–1969)	
James P. Hannigan	Xi Delta	Brigadier general, United States Army; dean of students, Texas A&M University (1959–1973)	
Carl Hanson	Iota Omicron (Honorary)	President of Gettysburg College (1961–1977)	
Clifford M. Hardin	Alpha Sigma (Honorary)	Chancellor of the University of Nebraska–Lincoln (1954–1969); United States Secretary of Agriculture (1969–1971)	
Henry Harmon	Omega (Honorary)	President of Drake University (1941–1964)	
Gaylord Harnwell	Delta Zeta (Honorary)	President of University of Pennsylvania (1953–1970)	
G. Alexander Heard	Theta Mu (Honorary)	Chancellor of Vanderbilt University (1963–1982)	
Dennis L. Hefner	Chi Pi (Honorary)	President of SUNY Fredonia (1997–present)	
John F. Herget	Alpha Mu Advisor	President of William Jewell College (1923–1943)	
Richard Herman	Alpha Alpha (Honorary)	Chancellor of the University of Illinois at Urbana-Champaign (2005— ), Distinguished Eagle Scout Award honoree	
Frank Reed Horton	Alpha	Founder of Alpha Phi Omega, First Supreme Grand Master	
George R. Houston, Jr.	Mu Alpha (Honorary)	President of Mount St. Mary's University (1994–2003)	
Livingston W. Houston	Epsilon Zeta (Honorary)	President of Rensselaer Polytechnic Institute (1943–1958)	
Frederick L. Hovde	Alpha Gamma (Honorary)	President of Purdue University (1946–1971)	
Claude B. Hutchison	Iota Phi	Botanist, agricultural economist, educator, and Mayor of the City of Berkeley, California (1955–1963)	
Ralph Cooper Hutchison	Alpha (Honorary)	President of Washington & Jefferson College and Lafayette College	
Harold Hutson	Eta Psi Advisor (Honorary)	President of Lycoming College	
Joseph S. Illick	Phi Advisor	Dean of the New York State College of Forestry (1944–51)	
Ralph Waldo Emerson Jones	Chi Nu (Honorary)	Second president of Grambling State University(1936–1977) Also coached the Grambling State Tigers baseball team, member National College Baseball Hall of Fame	
Robert B. Kamm		13th president of Oklahoma State University (1966-1977)	
Robert E. Kennedy	Zeta Omicron Advisor	President of California Polytechnic State University (1967–1979)	
Glenn Kendall	Eta Psi	President of California State University, Chico	
Henry King Stanford	Alpha Pi	President of the University of Miami (1962–1981)	
J. Martin Klotsche	Upsilon (Honorary)	President, provost, and chancellor of the University of Wisconsin–Milwaukee (1946–1973)	
A. Blair Knapp	Omicron Xi (Honorary)	President of Denison University (1951–1968); president of the National Association of Student Personnel Administrators (1951–1952)	
Bradford Knapp	Delta (Honorary)	President of Oklahoma Agricultural and Mechanical College (1923–1928); president of Alabama Polytechnic Institute (1928–1932) and president of Texas Technological College (1932–1938)	
Martin Lancaster	Rho	Member of United States House of Representatives from North Carolina (1987–1995); North Carolina House of Representatives (1979–1986); president of North Carolina Community College System	
Richard Landini	Beta Lambda (Honorary)	President of Indiana State University (1975–1992)	
John F. Laughlin	Alpha Omega Advisor	President of Kirksville College of Osteopathic Medicine (1924–1945)	
Karl C. Leebrick	Phi Advisor	President of Kent State University (1938–1943)	
Jeffrey S. Lehman	Gamma	President of Cornell University (2003–2005)	
L. Jay Lemons	Xi Iota (Honorary)	President of Susquehanna University (2001— )	
William Mather Lewis	Alpha (Honorary)	President of Lafayette College (1927–1945)	
John V. Lombardi	Tau (Honorary)	President of the University of Florida (1990–1999), chancellor of the University of Massachusetts Amherst, president of Louisiana State University (2002— )	
John Henry MacCracken	Alpha	President of Lafayette College (1915–1926)	
C. Peter Magrath	Gamma Psi (Honorary)	President of the University of Minnesota (1974–1984) and president of the University of Missouri (1985–1991)	
Daniel L. Marsh	Zeta Upsilon (Honorary)	President of Boston University (1926–1951)	
Henry J. Martin	Omicron Lambda (Honorary)	Acting president of Calumet College of St. Joseph (ca. 1965)	
James A. McCain	Pi (Honorary)	President of Kansas State University (1950–1975)	
Charles T. McDowell	Theta Tau Advisor	Professor emeritus and former director of the Center for Post-Soviet and Eastern European Studies at the University of Texas at Arlington	
Patrick Joseph McCormick	Zeta Mu (Honorary)	7th Rector of Catholic University of America (1943–1953)	
Robert McMahan	Lambda Nu	President of Kettering University	
Dan MacMillan	Xi Sigma	President of Bluefield College (1997–2006)	
Charles W. Meister	Nu Nu (Honorary)	President of Eastern New Mexico University (1965–1975)	
William J. Micheels	Eta Kappa (Honorary)	President of University of Wisconsin–Stout (1961–1972).	
Stephen G. Miller	Delta Omicron	Faculty at the University of California at Berkeley and archeologist who excavated the ancient site at Nemea, Greece	
Ernest Carroll Moore	Chi Advisor	Provost and Vice President of University of California, Los Angeles (1919–1936)	
Richard V. Moore		President of Bethune-Cookman College (1947–1975)	
Daniel Walter Morehouse	National Honorary	President of Drake University (1922–1941)	
James Morrill		President of University of Wyoming (1942–1945), president of University of Minnesota (1945–1960)	
Donald C. Moyer	Nu Nu (Honorary)	President of Eastern New Mexico University (1960–1965) and first president of University of Nevada, Las Vegas (1965–1968)	
Grover E. Murray	(Honorary)	President of Texas Tech University (1966–1976)	
Harvey A. Neville	Alpha Psi (Honorary)	President of Lehigh University (1961–1964)	
Walter Stephenson Newman	Zeta Beta (Honorary)	President of Virginia Tech (1947–1962)	
Calvin Cleave Nolen	Alpha Rho	President of University of North Texas (1971-1979)	
Arno Nowotny	Alpha Rho Advisor	Dean of Student Activities at the University of Texas at Austin (1946–1964)	
A. Ray Olpin	Iota Psi (Honorary)	President of University of Utah (1946–1964)	
John W. Oswald	Alpha Beta (Honorary)	President of Pennsylvania State University (1970–1982)	
Albert G. Parker	Kappa Iota (Honorary)	President of Hanover College (1929–1958)	
Norman A. Parker	Sigma Sigma (Honorary)	Chancellor of University of Illinois at Chicago Circle (1961–1971)	
Davis Young Paschall	Nu Rho (Honorary)	president of the College of William & Mary (1960 to 1971)	
Willard Stewart Paul	Iota Omicron (Honorary)	President of Gettysburg College and Commander of the 26th Infantry Division during World War II	
Benjamin L Perry Jr.	Kappa Delta Advisor	President of Florida A&M (1968–1977)	
Harry M. Philpott	Delta (Honorary)	President of Auburn University (1965–1979)	
C. I. Pontius		President of the University of Tulsa (1935–1959)	
Bruce Poulton	Iota Lambda(?)	Chancellor of North Carolina State University (1982–1989)	
Donald B. Prentice	Alpha	President of Rose-Hulman Institute of Technology (1931–1948)	
Phil Prince	Gamma Lambda	President of Clemson University (1994–1995) and senior vice president of American Express	
Claudius Pritchard	Alpha Alpha Alpha (Honorary)	President of Maryville College (1977–1992)	
Thomas Ramage	Alpha Zeta Omega (Honorary)	President of Parkland College (2007–present)	
Harry Ransom	Alpha Rho	President of University of Texas at Austin, chancellor of the University of Texas System	
Stanley Rives	Delta Psi (Honorary)	President of Eastern Illinois University	
M. Richard Rose	Iota Upsilon	President of Rochester Institute of Technology (1979–1992); president of Alfred University (1974–1978)	
Walter Harrington Ryle, III	Epsilon Advisor	President of Northeast Missouri State Teachers College (1937–1967)	
Willam Schlaerth	Iota Zeta (Honorary)	President of Le Moyne College (1947–1954)	
Walter Dill Scott	National Honorary	President of Northwestern University (1920–1939)	
Mark F. Scully	Beta Psi (Honorary)	President of Southeast Missouri State University (1956–1975)	
Gene E. Sease		fifth president of the University of Indianapolis	
Charles A. Sevrinson	Alpha Lambda (Honorary)	Acting President of North Dakota State University (1946)	
Robert H. Shaffer	Alpha Upsilon	pioneer in the field of college student personnel and student affairs; Indiana University Bloomington Dean of Students (1955–1969)	
Kenneth "Buzz" Shaw	Phi (Honorary)	Chancellor of Syracuse University (1991–2004), president of the University of Wisconsin System (1985–1991), chancellor of Southern Illinois University (1979–1986), president of Southern Illinois University Edwardsville (1977–1979)	
Raymond L. Smith		Sixth President of Michigan Tech University (1965–1979)	
Albert J. Simone	Xi Zeta (Honorary)	President of Rochester Institute of Technology (1993–2006)	
John Duncan Spaeth	Alpha Eta (Honorary)	President of University of Kansas City (1936–1938)	
Graham Spanier	Alpha Beta (Honorary)	Former president of Pennsylvania State University	
John Nissley Stauffer	Zeta Rho (Honorary)	President of Wittenberg University (1963–1968)	
Wallace Sterling	Zeta (Honorary)	President of Stanford University	
Elmo Stevenson	Zeta Xi	President of Southern Oregon University (1946–1969)	
Axel D. Steuer	Zeta Epsilon Advisor and Eta Sigma Advisor	President of Gustavus Adolphus College (1991–2002), president of Illinois College (2003— (2008))	
Samuel Stevens	Kappa Nu (Honorary)	President of Grinnell College (1940-1954)	
J. Lem Stokes II	Omicron Omicron (Honorary)	President of Pfeiffer University (1953–1968)	
Ernest Stone	Omega Chi (Honorary)	President of Jacksonville State University (1971–1981)	
Harry P. Storke	Omicron Iota (Honorary)	President of Worcester Polytechnic Institute (1962–1969), Major General, US Army	
Robert L. Sumwalt	Iota Mu (Honorary)	President of University of South Carolina (1959–1962)	
Robert Swanson	Omicron Tau (Honorary)	President of Alma College (1956–1980)	
H. Patrick Swygert	Zeta Phi	President of Howard University (1995–2007), president of State University of New York at Albany (1990–1995)	
William Tate	Beta Zeta (Honorary)	Dean of Men of the University of Georgia (1946–1971)	
Willis M. Tate	Alpha Omicron (Honorary)	President of Southern Methodist University (1954–1972, 1974–1976)	
Harvey L. Taylor	Eta Omicron (Honorary)	Vice President of Brigham Young University, Administrator of all Latter Day Saint seminaries	
Donald Richard Theophilus	Gamma Nu (Honorary)	President of the University of Idaho (1954–1965)	
Ralph Tirey	Beta Lambda Advisor	President of Indiana State University (1933–1953)	
Maurice E. Van Ackeren	Gamma Xi Advisor(?)	President of Rockhurst University (1951–1977)	
William G. Van Note	Omicron Theta (Honorary)	President of Monmouth University (1962–1971)	
Rufus B. von KleinSmid	Alpha Beta (Honorary)	President of the University of Arizona (1914–1921) and president of the University of Southern California (1921–1947).	
Eric A. Walker	Alpha Beta (Honorary)	President of Pennsylvania State University (1956–1970)	
Charles O. Warren	Alpha Beta Chi (Honorary)	President of State University of New York at Plattsburgh (1986–1994)	
Ernest Wallace		historian of Texas, the American West and the southern Great Plains, who was affiliated with Texas Tech University	
Charles Warren	(Honorary)	President of SUNY-Plattsburgh and Lynchburg College	
David Weaver	Epsilon Pi (Honorary)	President of Shurtleff College	
Harold Weaver	Rho Nu (Honorary)	President of Sierra College	
John Philip Wernette	Delta Tau (Honorary)	President of the University of New Mexico (1945–1948)	
Ross S. Whaley	Phi (Honorary)	President of State University of New York College of Environmental Science and Forestry (1984–2000)	
Martin D. Whitaker	Alpha Psi (Honorary), Alpha Beta	President of Lehigh University (1946–1960)	
Goodrich C. White	Delta Kappa Advisor	President of Emory University (1942–1957); chancellor of Emory University (1957–1979)	
Robert I. White	Epsilon Psi (Honorary)	President of Kent State University (1963–1971)	
Thomas Whitley	Chi Theta (Honorary)	First president of Columbus State University (1958–1979)	
Charles E. Wicks		Oregon State University professor of chemical engineering	
Norman Adrian Wiggins	Nu Kappa (Honorary)	Third President of Campbell University	
O. Meredith Wilson	Gamma Psi (Honorary)	President of University of Minnesota	
Lawrence S. Wittner	Columbia University	American historian who has written extensively on peace movements and foreign policy	
Frank Wickhorst	Gamma Gamma	University of California, Berkeley Football Coach (1946)	
Victor R. Yanitelli	Xi Xi and Omicron Sigma (Honorary)	President of Saint Peter's College, New Jersey (1965–1978)	
Hugh Edwin Young	Sigma Xi (Honorary)	President of University of Maine (1965–1968)	
Lloyd P. Young	Eta Delta (Honorary)	President of Keene State College (1939–1964)	

== Business ==
Name	Original chapter	Notability	Ref.
Vincent P. Barabba	Nu Tau	Director of United States Census Bureau (1973–1976, 1979–1981), co-founder of Wirthlin Group, general manager of corporate strategy and knowledge development at General Motors (1996–2003)	
Kenneth K. Bechtel	Mu Zeta (Honorary)	National president of the Boy Scouts of America (1956–1959); founder of the Bechtel Corporation	
Jake Butcher	Unknown	Democratic Party nominee for governor of Tennessee in 1978 and primary promoter of the 1982 World's Fair in Knoxville, Tennessee	
Erle Cocke, Jr.	Beta Zeta	National Commander of the American Legion (1950–1951). Vice President of Delta Air Lines (ca. 1961), alternate executive director of the International Bank for Reconstruction and Development, Brigadier General of the Georgia Army National Guard	
Barron Collier	Unknown (Honorary)	Advertising entrepreneur and developer	
Edwin L. Cox	Alpha Omicron	American businessman	
Howard Gossage	Alpha Eta	Advertising executive	
Zenon C.R. Hansen	Iota	Chairman and CEO of Mack Trucks, Inc. (1965–1974)	
E. Faye Jones	Beta Rho	Noted American architect and designer, apprentice of Frank Lloyd Wright	
James McLernon	Epsilon Sigma	President of Volkswagen of America (1976–1982)	
Philip Pfeffer	Zeta Nu	Chairman of Random House (1996–1998) and CEO of Borders (1999)	
John J. Sie	Lambda Gamma	Founder and chairman of Starz Entertainment Group LLC	

== Entertainment ==
Name	Original chapter	Notability	Ref.
St. Clair Bourne	Mu Alpha	Documentary Film Maker focusing on African American social issues and themes	
Joe E. Brown	Alpha Kappa (Honorary)	Actor/Comedian. Best known for playing Osgood Fielding, III in, Some Like It Hot.	
Roundy Coughlin	Beta Theta	Sports columnist from Madison, Wisconsin	
Jason Ivy	University of Pennsylvania	American singer, songwriter, rapper, and actor.	
Cherie Johnson	Alpha Theta Lambda (Honorary)	actress, writer, film producer and author, best known as Maxine Johnson from Family Matters.	
Carson Kressley	Iota Omicron	Fashion expert on the television program, Queer Eye for the Straight Guy.	
Chelsea Malone	Lambda Omicron	Miss West Virginia 2015	
Anthony Neely	Rho Pi	Taiwanese Mandopop singer	
M. Sayle Taylor		Operated The Voice of Experience, a radio advice show on CBS, then NBC and finally on Mutual	
War Eagle IV	Delta (Honorary)	Mascot of Auburn University (1964–1980)	
War Eagle V	Delta (Honorary)	Mascot of Auburn University (1981–1986)	
War Eagle VI	Delta (Honorary)	Mascot of Auburn University (1986–2006), part of Opening Ceremonies at 2002 Winter Olympics	

== Law ==
Name	Original chapter	Notability	Ref.
Robert M. Bell	Mu Gamma	Chief Judge Maryland Court of Appeals (Highest Court in Maryland)	
Arnold Burns	Eta Gamma	United States Deputy Attorney General (1986–1988)	
William Joseph Campbell	National Honorary	Federal District Judge (1940–1988)	
Glenn T. Harrell Jr.	Epsilon Mu	Judge on the Maryland Court of Appeals (1999–2015)	
Harry Lee Hudspeth	Alpha Rho	United States District Judge of the United States District Court for the Western District of Texas	
Robert C. Hunter	Rho	Associate Justice of the North Carolina Court of Appeals; Member of the North Carolina House of Representatives (1980–1988)	
Royce Lamberth	Alpha Rho	Senior Judge of the United States District Court for the District of Columbia	
Sherman Minton	Mu (Honorary)	United States sentor from Indiana (1935–1941); Associate Justice of the Supreme Court of the United States (1949–1956).	
Wilbur Frank Pell, Jr.	Mu	Federal Judge on United States Court of Appeals for the Seventh Circuit 1970–2000	
Marvin B. Rosenberry	Beta Theta (Honorary)	Chief Justice of Wisconsin Supreme Court (1929–1950)	
Rodney Smith	Kappa Delta	United States District Judge of the United States District Court for the Southern District of Florida	
William K. Suter	Delta Pi	19th Clerk of the Supreme Court of the United States (1991–2013), acting Judge Advocate General	
Hubert Utterback	Omega Advisor	Associate Justice for Iowa Supreme Court (1932–1933); member of the United States House of Representatives from Iowa (1935–1937); Unsuccessful candidate for United States Senate	
T. John Ward	Beta Sigma	United States federal judge for the Eastern District of Texas, best known for the large number of patent infringement cases brought before his court.	

== Literature and journalism ==
Name	Original chapter	Notability	Ref.
Wendell J. Ashton	Iota Psi (Honorary)	Publisher Deseret Morning News 1978–1985, Spokesman (Church Public Communications Department President) for the Latter Day Saints during the 1970s	
Jonathan Blum	Epsilon Mu	Writer and Novelist	
Roundy Coughlin	Beta Theta	Sports columnist from Madison, Wisconsin	
Darwin J. Flakoll	San Diego State University	journalist, Hispanist, writer and translator	
John Loftus	Upsilon Zeta	author, newspapers columnist, and president of the Florida Holocaust Museum	
Darwin T. Turner	Delta Alpha	Leading writer, Editor, and critic of African American literature; youngest graduate of the University of Cincinnati	

== Military ==
Name	Original chapter	Notability	Ref.
Mark W. Clark	Unknown	American general during World War II and the Korean War	
Raymond Fleming	Beta Phi (Honorary)	United States Army Major General who served as Chief of the National Guard Bureau, commander of the 39th Infantry Division, and Adjutant General of Louisiana	
Lewis Blaine Hershey	Unknown	United States Army general who served as the second director of the Selective Service System	
Louis H. Renfrow	Alpha Phi (Honorary)	Brigadier general in the United States Army, president of the International College of Dentists (1951)	
Togo D. West, Jr.	Zeta Phi	Secretary of the Army (1993–1997) and Secretary of Veterans Affairs (1998–2000) for the Clinton Administration	

== Politics and Government ==
Name	Original chapter	Notability	Ref.
Héctor Luis Acevedo	Omicron Nu	Mayor of San Juan, Puerto Rico (1988–1996), Candidate for Governor of Puerto Rico in 1996	
Kelly Albright	Delta Beta	Member of Oklahoma House of Representatives from the 95th district from 2018 to 2020	
Elmer L. Andersen	Gamma Psi	Governor of Minnesota (1961–1963)	
Victor Anderson	Alpha Sigma (Honorary)	Mayor of Lincoln, Nebraska (1950–1953); Governor of Nebraska (1955–1959)	
Christopher Ashby	Mu Alpha	United States Ambassador to Uruguay, 1997–2001	
Reubin Askew	Iota Rho	Governor of Florida (1971–1979)	
Julian Bamberger	Iota Psi (Honorary)	Utah State Senate (1932-1936)	
Melody Barnes	Rho	Director of the Domestic Policy Council, appointed by President-Elect Barack Obama in 2008	
H. Roe Bartle	Iota Advisor	Mayor of Kansas City, Missouri (1955–1963) and namesake of the Kansas City Chiefs	
Ronald M. Belt	Alpha Phi	Member of the Missouri House of Representatives (1958–1973)	
Robert D. Blue	Omega (Honorary)	30th Governor of Iowa (1945–1949)	
J. Caleb Boggs	Zeta Sigma (Honorary)	Member of the United States House of Representatives (1947–1953) from Delaware; Governor of Delaware (1953–1960); United States senator from Delaware (1961–1973)	
Julian Bond	Psi Omicron (Honorary)	He was the first president of the Southern Poverty Law Center. served twenty years in the Georgia Legislature. Former chairman of the NAACP	
Cecil Bothwell	Delta Kappa	Member of Asheville, North Carolina City Council and writer	
Roger D. Branigin	Alpha Gamma (Honorary)	Governor of Indiana (1965–1969)	
Edward T. Breathitt	Unknown	Governor of Kentucky (1963–1967)	
Dolph Briscoe	Alpha Rho	Governor of Texas (1973–1979)	
Ewart Brown	Zeta Phi	Premier of Bermuda (2006–2010)	
C. Farris Bryant	Iota Rho (Honorary)	Governor of Florida (1961–1965), Member of the United States National Security Council	
Keith Bulen	Mu	Indiana Politician	
George H. W. Bush	Alpha Phi (Honorary)	President of the United States (1989–1993)	
Jimmy Carter	Delta Kappa (Honorary)	President of the United States.	
Nadarius Clark	Sigma Mu	Member of the Virginia General Assembly District 79 (2022–)	
Bill Clinton	Mu Alpha	Forty-second president of the United States (1993–2001)	
Hillary Clinton	Alpha Beta Chi (Honorary)	First Lady of the United States (1993–2001); United States senator from New York (2001–2009), and United States secretary of state (2009)	
Tom Daschle	Mu Sigma	Member United States House of Representatives (1979–1987) from South Dakota, Member United States senator from South Dakota (1987–2005), former United States Senate Majority and Minority Leader. (2009)	
Ilus W. Davis	Alpha Eta	Mayor of Kansas City, Missouri (1963–1971), Member of Kansas City City Council (1948–1956)	
Marla Graff Decker	Iota Omicron	Virginia Secretary of Public Safety, judge on Court of Appeals of Virginia	
Jerry Demings	Psi Omega	Mayor of Orange County, Florida 2018–	
Joseph Doria	Omicron Sigma	Mayor of Bayonne, New Jersey (1998— ), New Jersey State Assemblyman (1980–2004), New Jersey State Senator (2004— ), Speaker of the New Jersey State Assembly (1990–1991).	
Winfield Dunn	Chi Zeta (Honorary)	Governor of Tennessee (1971–1975)	
Dwight D. Eisenhower	National Honorary	Thirty-fourth President of the United States	
Don Eldridge	Alpha Xi	Speaker of the Washington House of Representatives (1967–1970), member of the Washington State House of Representatives (1952–1970)	
Daniel J. Evans	Gamma Alpha (Honorary)	Governor of Washington (1965–1977); United States senator from Washington (1983–1989)	
Arthur Flemming	Zeta Psi (Honorary)	United States Secretary of Health, Education, and Welfare (1958–1961); President of Ohio Wesleyan University (1948–1953, 1957–1958); president of the University of Oregon (1961–1968)	
Erik Robert Fleming	Omega Psi	Member Mississippi House of Representatives, District 72. Democratic Nominee for the US Senate from Mississippi, 2006 and Democratic Nominee for the US Senate from Mississippi, 2008	
Gerald Ford	Gamma Pi (Honorary)	Thirty-eighth President of the United States (1974–1977)	
Mark Formby	Epsilon Iota	Member of the Mississippi House of Representatives, District 108, chairman of Mississippi Workers' Compensation	
Robert Gates	Nu Rho	22nd United States Secretary of Defense; president of Texas A&M University (2002–2006); Director of Central Intelligence (1991–1993)	
Mikhail Gorbachev	Xi Zeta (Honorary)	General Secretary of the Communist Party of the Soviet Union	
Aubrey B. Hamilton	Alpha Phi	Member Missouri House of Representatives (1942–1944); Corporation Attorney for the City of St. Louis, Missouri	
Maura Harty	Mu Alpha	Assistant Secretary, Bureau of Consular Affairs – United States Department of State, US Ambassador to Paraguay (1997–1999)	
Charles Alexander Harvin	Upsilon Rho	Member of South Carolina House of Representatives, District 64 (1977–2005); South Carolina House of Representatives Majority Leader (1982–1986)	
Mark Hatfield	Epsilon Kappa Active and Alpha Mu (Honorary)	United States senator from Oregon (1966–1996); Governor of Oregon (1958–1966)	
Joe L. Hayes Jr.	Nu Omega Advisor	Alaska State House Representative 2001–2003	
Wendell H. Hanson	Alpha Rho	Member of the South Dakota Senate (1977–1978, 1981–1982)	
John F. Herrity	Mu Alpha	Chairman Fairfax County, Virginia Board of Supervisors (1976–1988); Official Namesake for Fairfax County Parkway	
Robert Holden	Beta Mu	Governor of Missouri (2001–2005)	
William T. Holloway	Nu Iota	Member of Florida House of Representatives, District 103 (2000— )	
Herbert Hoover	Lambda Theta (Honorary)	President of the United States (1929–1933)	
J. Edgar Hoover	Epsilon Mu (Honorary)	Director of the Federal Bureau of Investigation (1924–1972)	
William Marion Jardine	Unknown (Honorary)	United States Secretary of Agriculture from 1925 to 1929 and as the U.S. Minister to Egypt from 1930 to 1933	
Russell Jones	Theta Iota	Member of the Arizona House of Representatives, District 24 (2005–2007, 2009–2013)	
Thomas Kean	Pi Upsilon Advisor	Governor of New Jersey (1982–1990); president of Drew University (1990–2005); chairman of the 9/11 Commission.	
John F. Kennedy	Epsilon Mu (Honorary)	President of the United States (1961–1963)	
Otto Kerner, Jr.	Alpha Alpha (Honorary)	Governor of Illinois (1961–1968), Judge on the United States Court of Appeals for the Seventh Circuit (1968–1974)	
Robert P. Kingsbury	Epsilon Mu	Member of New Hampshire House of Representatives Belknap 4 (2010–2012)	
J. Bracken Lee	Iota Psi (Honorary)	Governor of Utah (1949–1957), Mayor of Price, Utah (1935–1947), Mayor of Salt Lake City (1960–1971)	
Kent Lee	Rho Pi	president pro tempore of the San Diego City Council since (2024-)	
F. Joseph Loeper	Omicron Upsilon	Pennsylvania State Senator that represented the 26th senatorial district from 1979 through 2000	
Willie Logan	Unknown	Member of the Florida House of Representatives, District 103 (1982–2000)	
Derek Mallow	Pi Omega advisor	Member of the Georgia House of Representatives, District 163	
Frank Marsh	Alpha Sigma (Honorary)	Lieutenant Governor of Nebraska (1971–1975); Secretary of State of Nebraska (1953–1971)	
Nathaniel J. McFadden	Mu Gamma	Maryland state senator (1995–present), president pro tem of Maryland Senate	
John Medinger	Kappa Gamma	Wisconsin state assemblyman 1976–1992, mayor of La Crosse, Wisconsin 1997–2005	
Terry Miller	Nu Omega	Lieutenant Governor of Alaska (1978–1982)	
Sherman Minton	Mu (Honorary)	United States Senate from Indiana (1935–1941); Associate Justice of the Supreme Court of the United States (1949–1956).	
Manuel Miranda	Mu Alpha	American attorney, diplomat, journalist and political advocate	
Clarence Mitchell III	Epsilon Mu	Member of the Maryland Senate and the Maryland House of Delegates	
Dominick Moreno	Mu Alpha	Member of Colorado Legislature 2012–2023	
Luis Morse	Unknown	Member Florida House of Representatives, District 113 (1984–1998), Deputy Secretary Florida Department of Elder Affairs (1998–2002)	
Edwin R. Murray	Omega Eta	Member of the Louisiana Senate, District 4 (2005— ); member of the Louisiana State House of Representatives, District 96 (1991–2004)	
Michelle Obama	Gamma Sigma Advisor	Former Associate Dean of Student Services at the University of Chicago (1996—2002); First Lady of the United States (2009)	
John Alanson Perkins	Zeta Sigma (Honorary)	President of the University of Delaware (1950–1967); served as U.S. representative to the UNESCO (1953–1955); served as an Undersecretary of the United States Department of Health, Education, and Welfare (1956–1957).	
Joseph Peltier	Alpha Lambda	North Dakota House of Representative, (1979–1985); member of the State Board of Higher Education (1993–2000)	
Samuel Pierce	Gamma	United States Secretary of Housing and Urban Development during the Reagan Administration (1981–1989)	
Steve Poizner	Alpha Rho	California Businessman and California Insurance Commissioner (2006–); Candidate for the California Gubernatorial election of 2010	
L. Mendel Rivers	Upsilon Rho (Honorary)	U.S. Representative from South Carolina, representing the Charleston-based 1st congressional district for nearly 30 years. Chairman of the House Armed Services Committee as the U.S. escalated its involvement in the Vietnam War.	
Chuck Robb	Theta (Honorary)	Governor of Virginia (1982–1986); United States senator from Virginia (1989–2001); chair of the Iraq Intelligence Commission (2004); Member of the Iraq Study Group (2006)	
Carlos P. Romulo	National Honorary	President of the Fourth Session of U.N. General Assembly (1949–1950); chair of the U.N. Security Council (January 1957 & December 1957). Served with General Douglas MacArthur in the Pacific; Philippines Ambassador to the United States. Won the Pulitzer Prize for Correspondence in 1942, the first Asian to win the Pulitzer Prize	
David Gray Ross	Unknown	Member of the Maryland General Assembly (1970–1978); Circuit Court Judge (1978–1993)	
Donald S. Russell	Iota Mu (Honorary)	United States senator from South Carolina (1965–1966); Governor of South Carolina (1963–1965); president of the University of South Carolina (1952–1957); Judge of the United States Court of Appeals for the Fourth Circuit (1971–1998)	
Carl Sanders	Nu Epsilon (Honorary)	Governor of Georgia (1963–1967)	
Terry Sanford	Iota Lambda (Honorary)	Governor of North Carolina (1961–1965), United States Senator from North Carolina 1986–1993	
Henry F. Schricker	Alpha Gamma (Honorary)	Governor of Indiana (1941–1945, 1949–1953)	
William Sherrill	Delta Omega	member of the Federal Reserve Board of Governors (1967–1971)	
Sargent Shriver	Gamma Iota (Honorary)	Driving Force behind creation of the Peace Corps and Democratic Vice Presidential Nominee 1972	
Ike Skelton	Beta Eta	Member of United States House of Representatives from Missouri (1977–2006)	
Adlai Stevenson	Zeta Sigma (Honorary)	Democratic nominee for President of the United States (1952, 1956); United States Ambassador to the United Nations (1961–1965)	
Rex W. Tillerson	Alpha Rho	United States secretary of state (2017–18), former chairman and chief executive officer (CEO) of ExxonMobil Corporation	
Harry S. Truman	Alpha Mu (Honorary)	President of the United States (1945–1953)	
Joseph Tydings	Epsilon Mu	United States Senator from Maryland (1965–1971)	
Robert F. Wagner Jr.	Gamma Omicron (Honorary)	Mayor of New York City (1954—1965); United States Ambassador to Spain (1968–1969)	
Leo Winters	Beta Nu (Honorary)	Ninth Lieutenant Governor and eleventh State Treasurer for the U.S. state of Oklahoma	
Willard A. Wirtz	Eta	United States Secretary of Labor (1962–1969)	
Chuck Wright	Lambda	Mayor of Topeka, Kansas (1965–1969)	
Frank P. Zeidler	Upsilon (Honorary)	Mayor of Milwaukee, Wisconsin (1948–1960); National Chair and 1976 Presidential Nominee of the United States Socialist Party	

George H. W. Bush

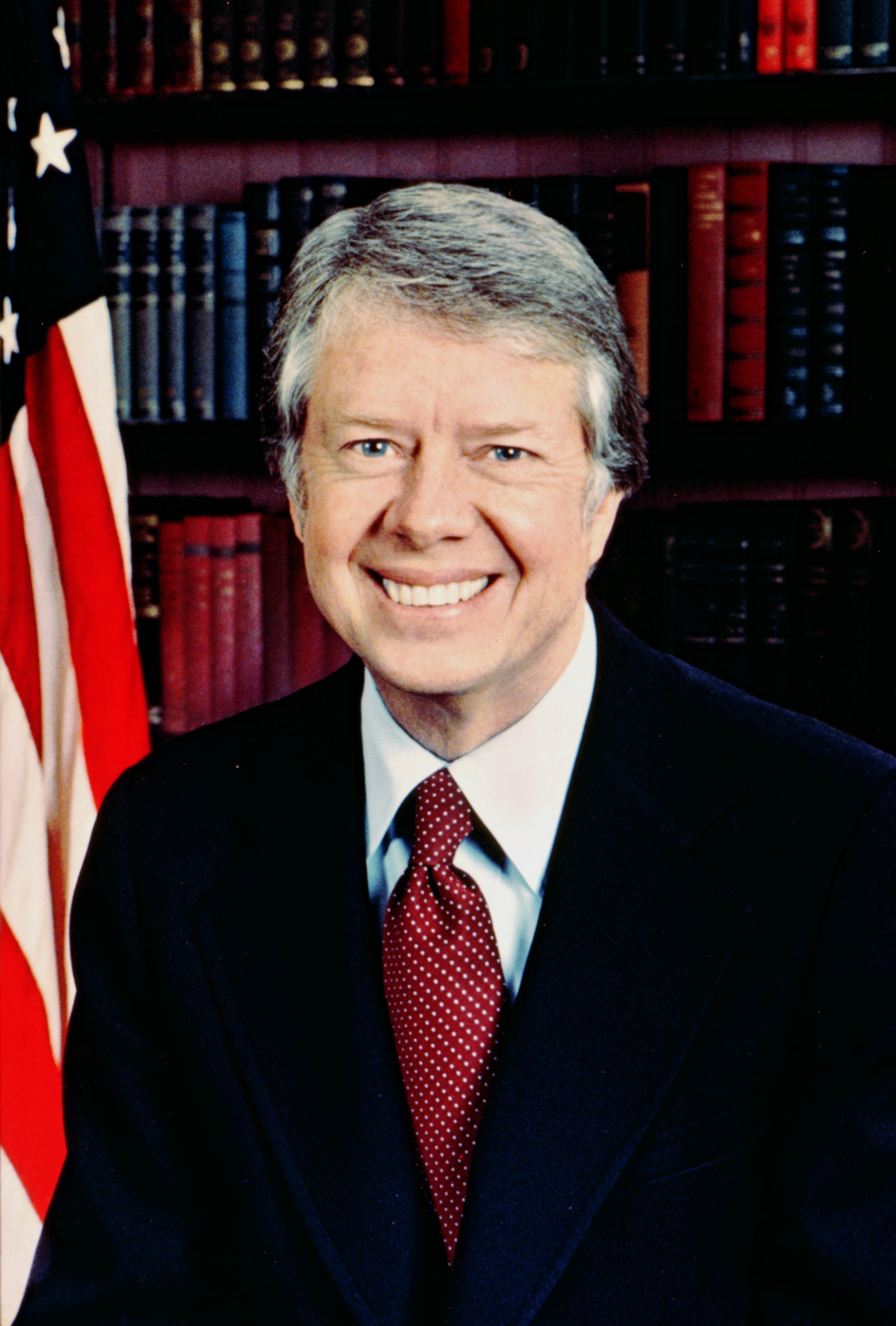
Jimmy Carter

Bill Clinton

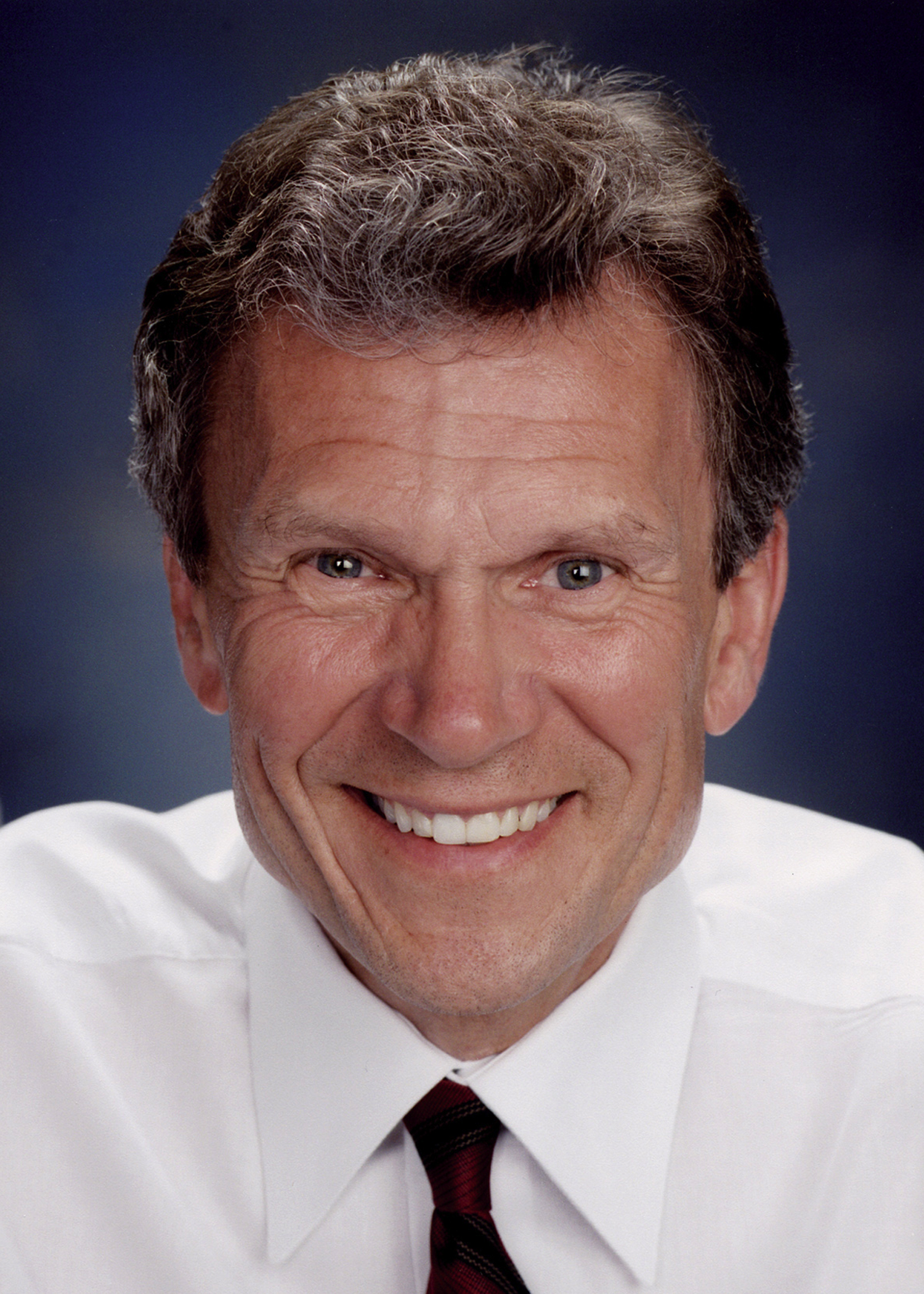
Tom Daschle

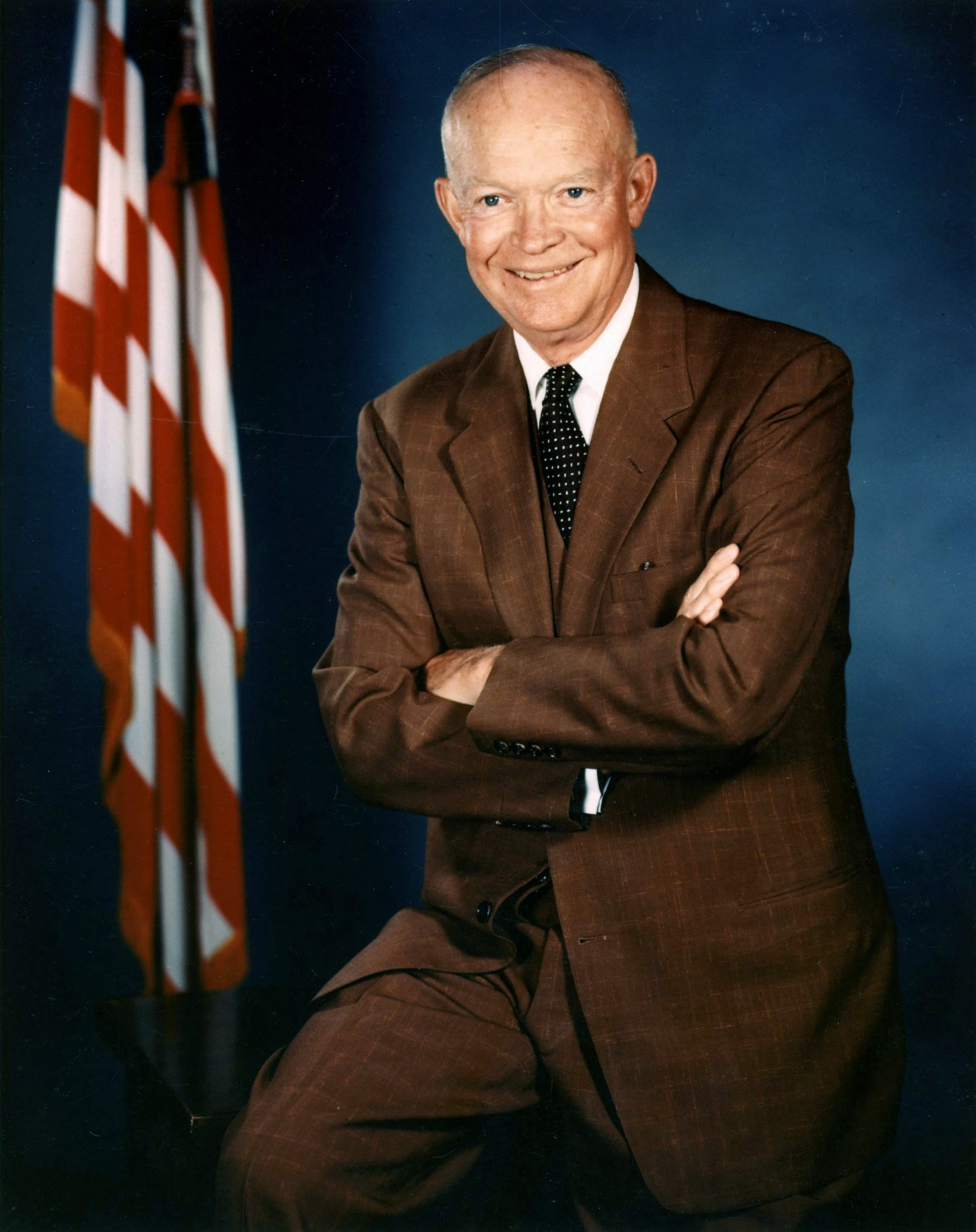
Dwight D. Eisenhower

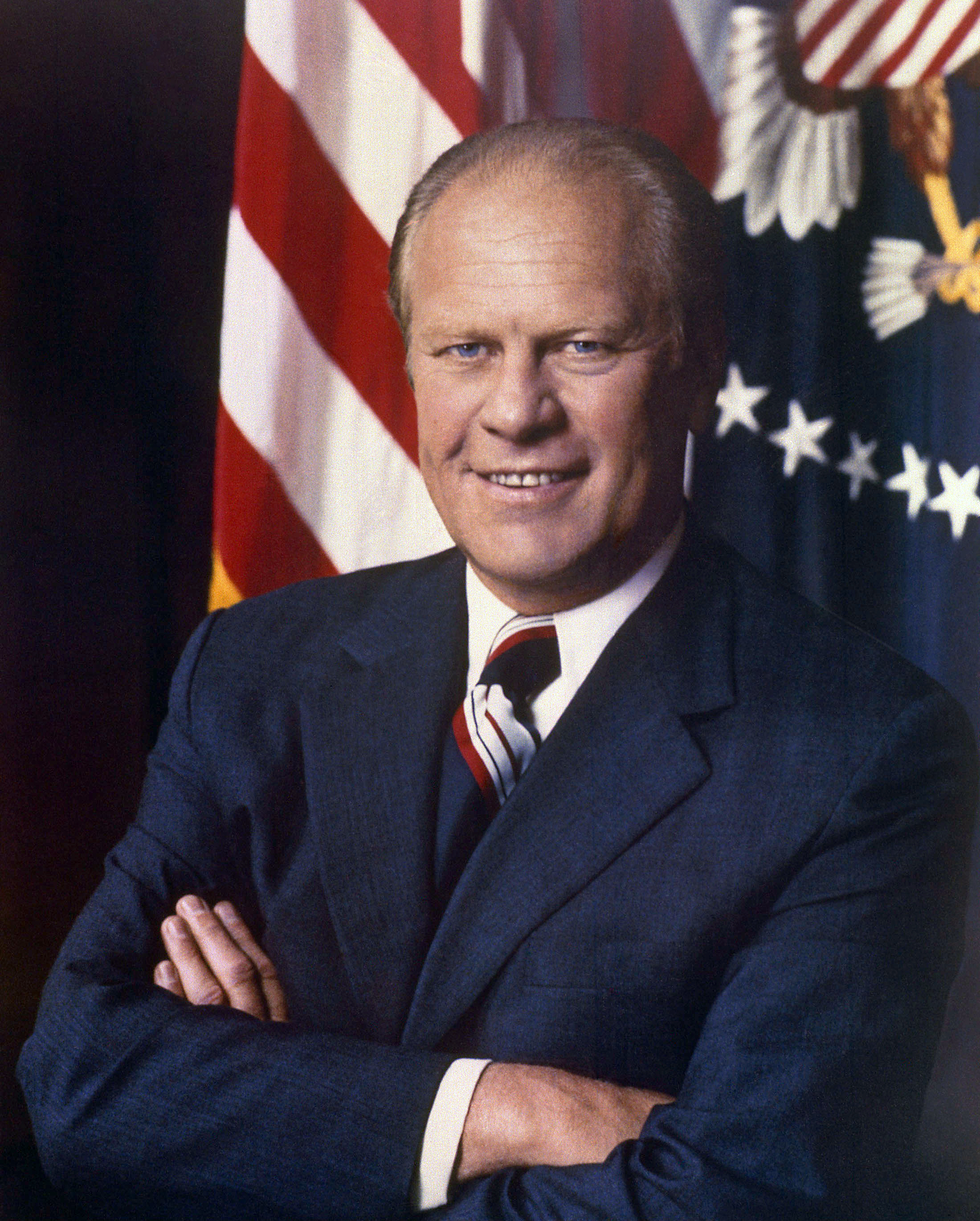
Gerald Ford

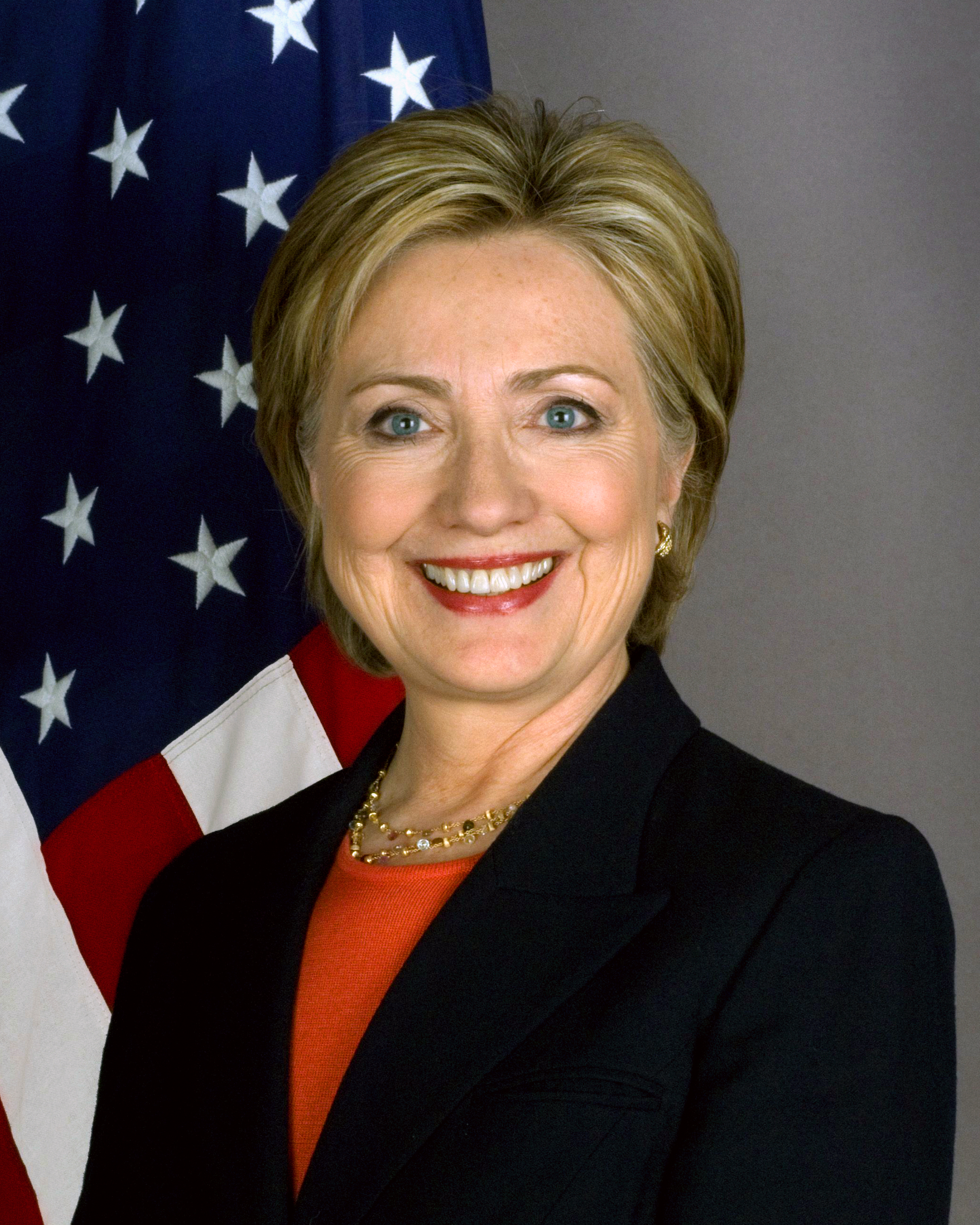
Hillary Clinton

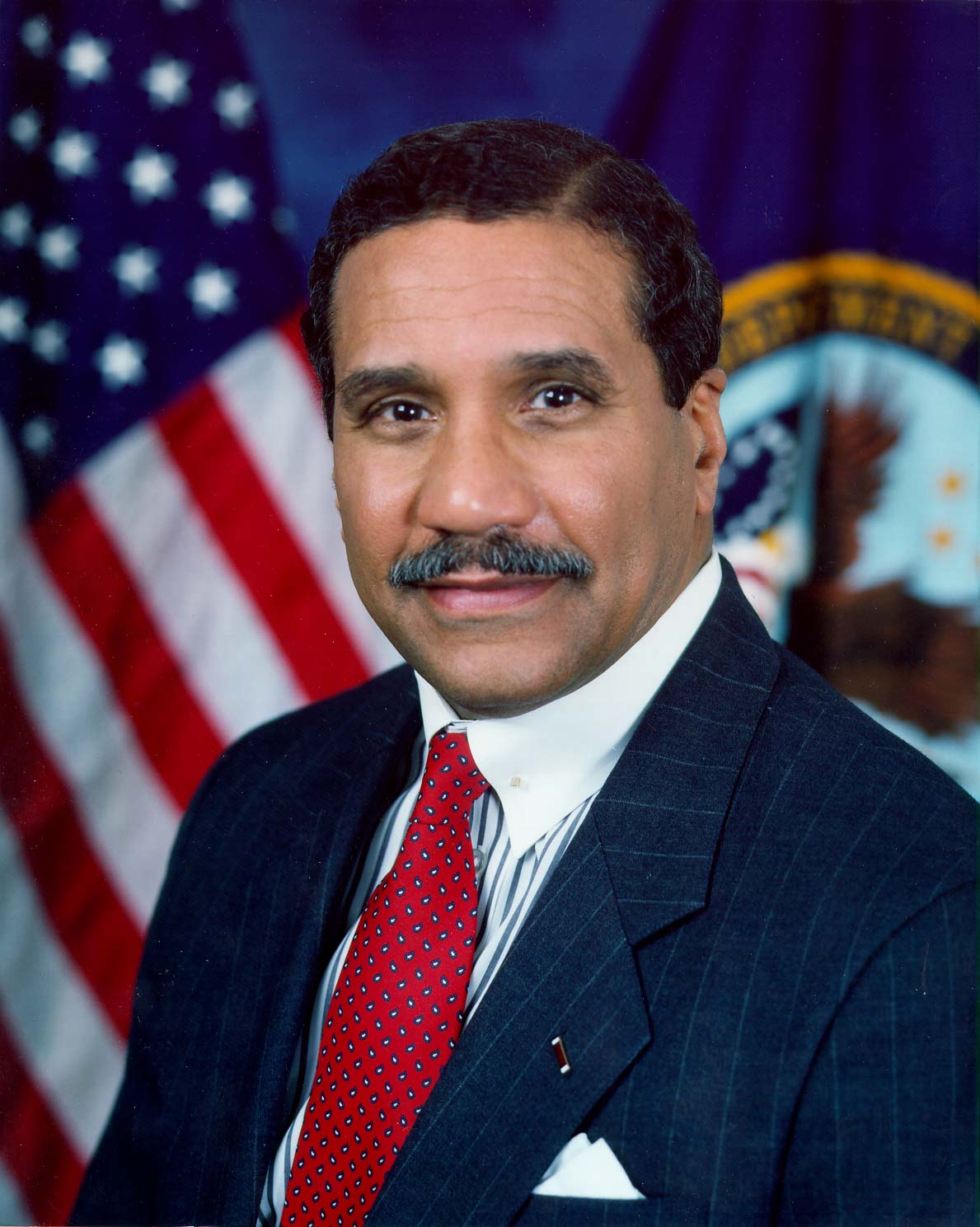
Secretary Togo D. West Jr.

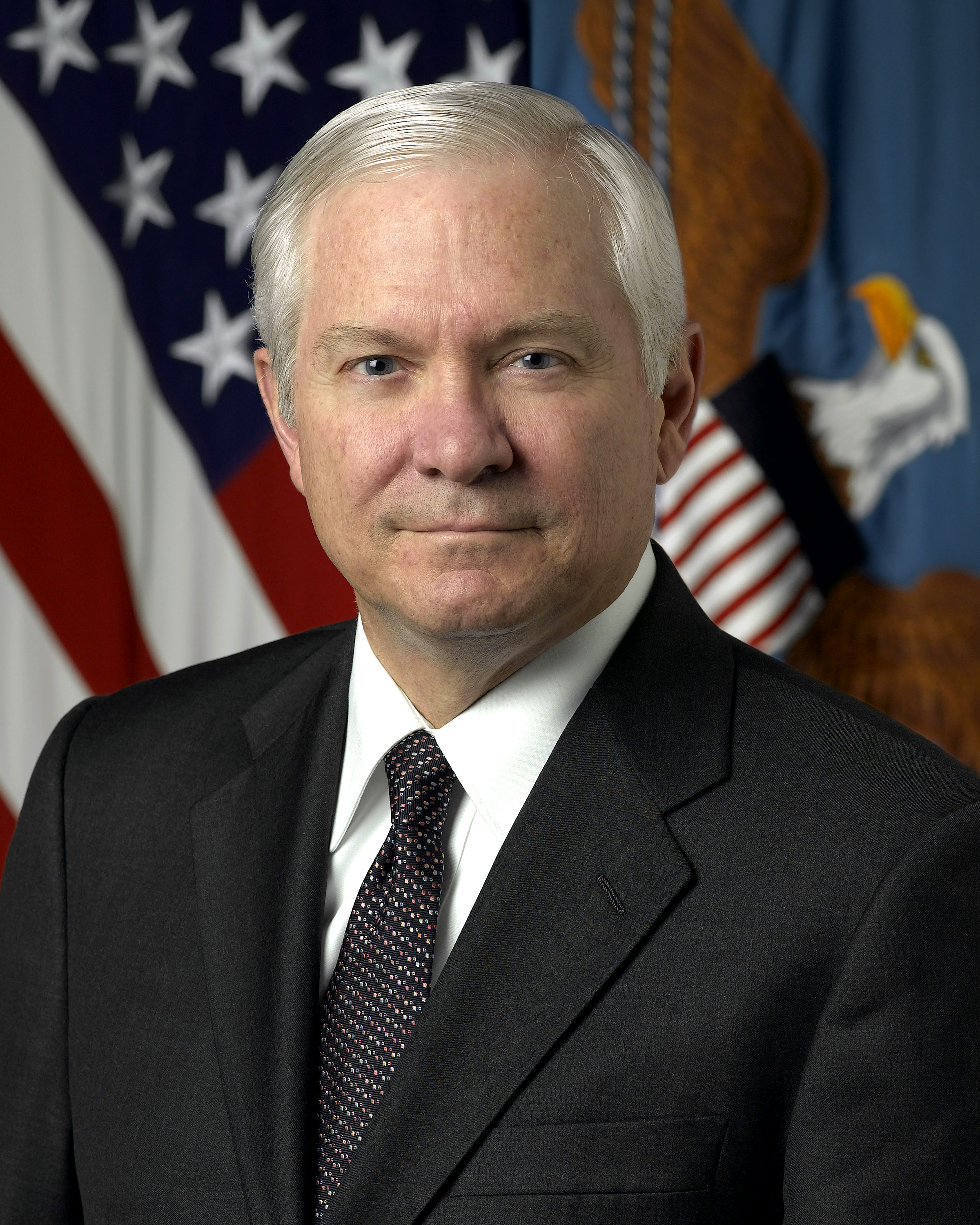
Robert Gates

Secretary Samuel Pierce

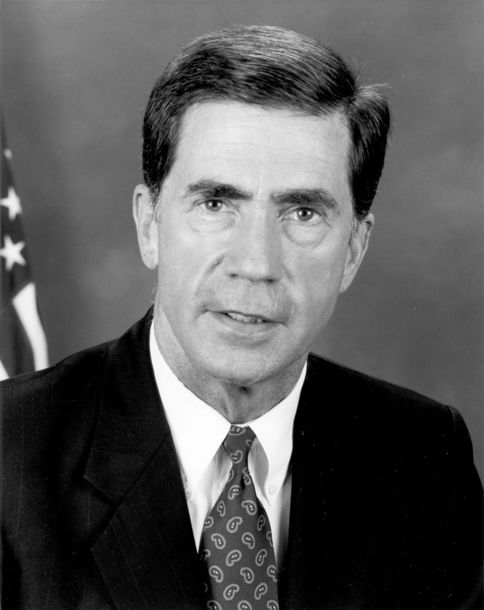
Governor Chuck Robb

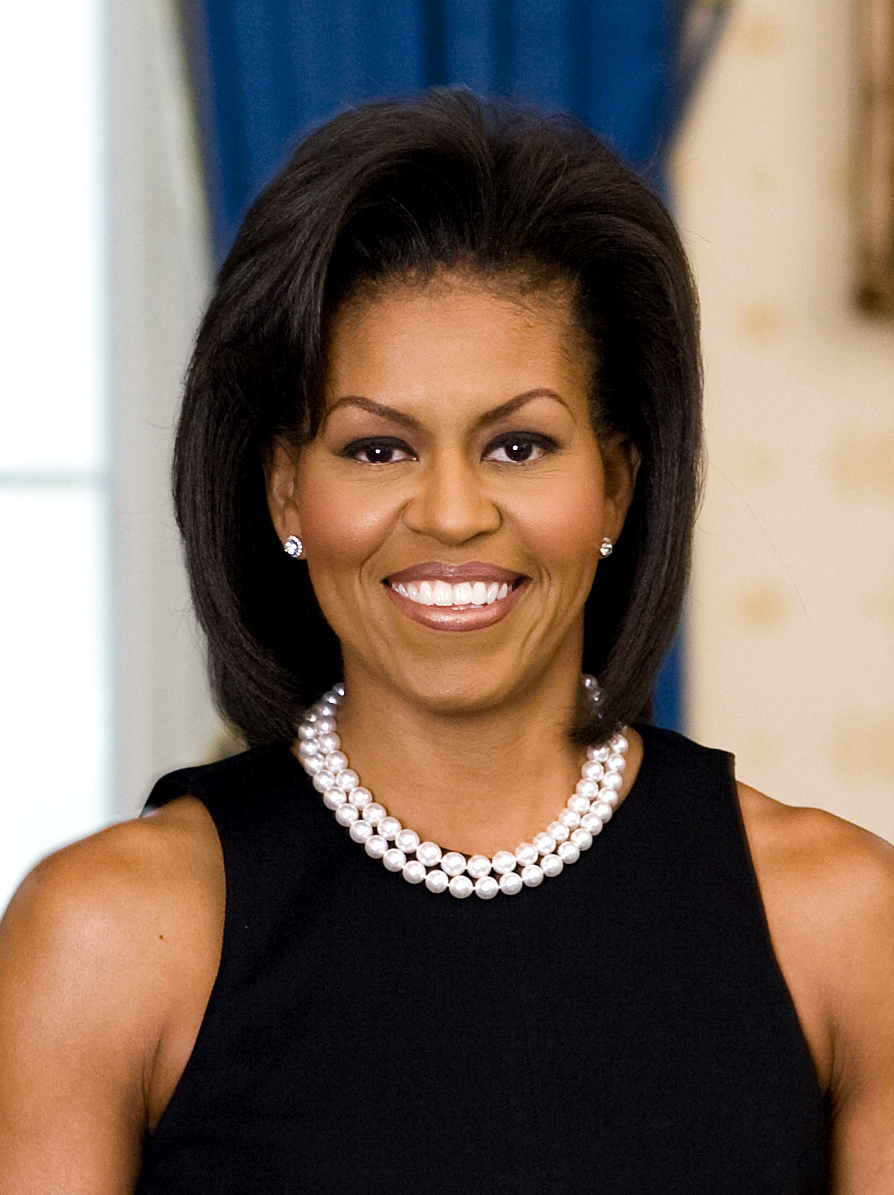
Michelle Obama

== Science, medicine, and technology ==
Name	Original chapter	Notability	Ref.
Robert Banks	Beta Omicron	Chemist, co-discoverer of polypropylene	
Bennett Haselton	Theta Mu	founder of Circumventor.com and Peacefire.org, two US-based websites dedicated to combating Internet censorship	
Helmut Karl Buechner	Phi	First head of the Office of Ecology of the Smithsonian Institution, senior ecologist for the National Zoo (1972–1975)	
John H. Eicher	Alpha Gamma	Chemist, member of the Manhattan Project	
John Giesy	Omicron Tau	Ecotoxicologist	
Jim Lovell	Beta Theta	Astronaut; Gemini 7; Gemini 12; Apollo 8; and commander of Apollo 13	
Robert Moog	Gamma Omicron	Engineer, inventor of the Moog synthesizer	
Fred Singer	Epsilon Mu (Honorary)	Atmospheric physicist	
Paul Siple	National Honorary	Geographer, Antarctic explorer, co-developer of the wind chill factor	
Robert A. Schwartz	Gamma Gamma	Physician, discoverer of AIDS-associated Kaposi sarcoma and Schwartz–Burgess syndrome	
E. Donnall Thomas	Alpha Rho	Co-recipient of the Nobel Prize in Physiology or Medicine (1990) for the development of cell and organ transplantation	
William Tebeau	Delta Eta	Engineer, first African-American man to graduate from Oregon State College	
Janice E. Voss	Alpha Gamma	Astronaut	
Cyril Wecht	Beta	Forensic pathologist, Allegheny County, Pennsylvania coroner (1969–1980, 1996–2005), Allegheny County commissioner (1979–1983)	
Sheldon Weinbaum	Epsilon Zeta	Biomedical engineer and biofluid mechanician	

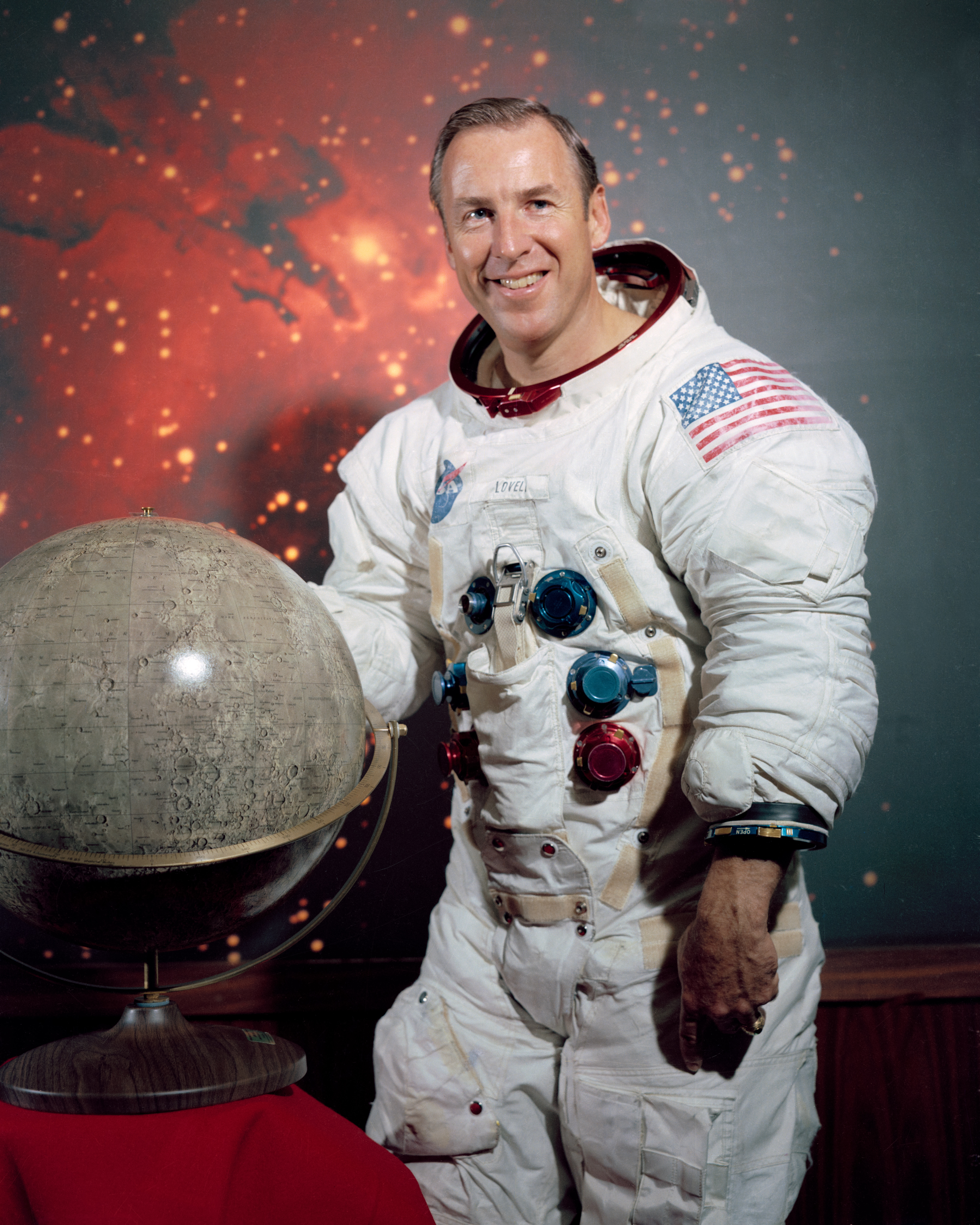
Astronaut Jim Lovell

== Scouting ==
Name	Original chapter	Notability	Ref.
Ellsworth H. Augustus	Theta Upsilon (Honorary)	National president of the Boy Scouts of America (1959–1964)	
Alden G. Barber	Chi	Chief Scout Executive of the Boy Scouts of America (1967–1976)	
Daniel Carter Beard	National Honorary	Co-founder of the Boy Scouts of America; National Scout Commissioner (1910–1941)	
Francis O. Belzer	Alpha Tau Advisor, Mu (Honorary)	Scout Executive for Central Indiana Boy Scout Council 1915–1940. Founder of Firecrafters. Eulogized as the 'Father of Scouting' in Indianapolis	
Gunnar Berg	National Honorary and Alpha Alpha	National director of the Boy Scouts of America	
Joseph Brunton	Gamma Omicron (Honorary)	Chief Scout Executive of the Boy Scouts of America (1960–1966); Director of Church Relations of the BSA (1952–1957)	
George J. Fisher	National Honorary	Deputy Chief Scout Executive of the BSA (1919–1943); National Scout Commissioner (1943–1960)	
James P. Fitch	Alpha Omicron Advisor	BSA region executive for Region Nine (Texas, Oklahoma, and New Mexico) (1920–1945)	
E. Urner Goodman	National Honorary	Founder of Order of the Arrow	
Stanley A. Harris	Rho (Honorary)	First Director of Inter-Racial Scouting, BSA	
Walter W. Head	Alpha Phi (Honorary)	National president of the Boy Scouts of America (1926–1931, 1931–1946).	
Harvey L. Price	Omicron Zeta (Honorary)	Chief Scout Executive of the Boy Scouts of America	
Edgar M. Robinson	Gamma Eta (Honorary)	Second managing director of the BSA; eighth Silver Buffalo Award recipient in 1926	
John M. Schiff	National Honorary	National president of the Boy Scouts of America (1951–1956)	
J. L. Tarr	National Honorary	Chief Scout Executive of the Boy Scouts of America (1979–1984).	
James E. West	National Honorary, Alpha Pi	First Chief Scout Executive of the Boy Scouts of America	
Ray O. Wyland	Alpha Advisor	BSA national director of education (1925–1952), BSA national director of the Division of Relationships (1922–1952), founding Advisor for Alpha Phi Omega	

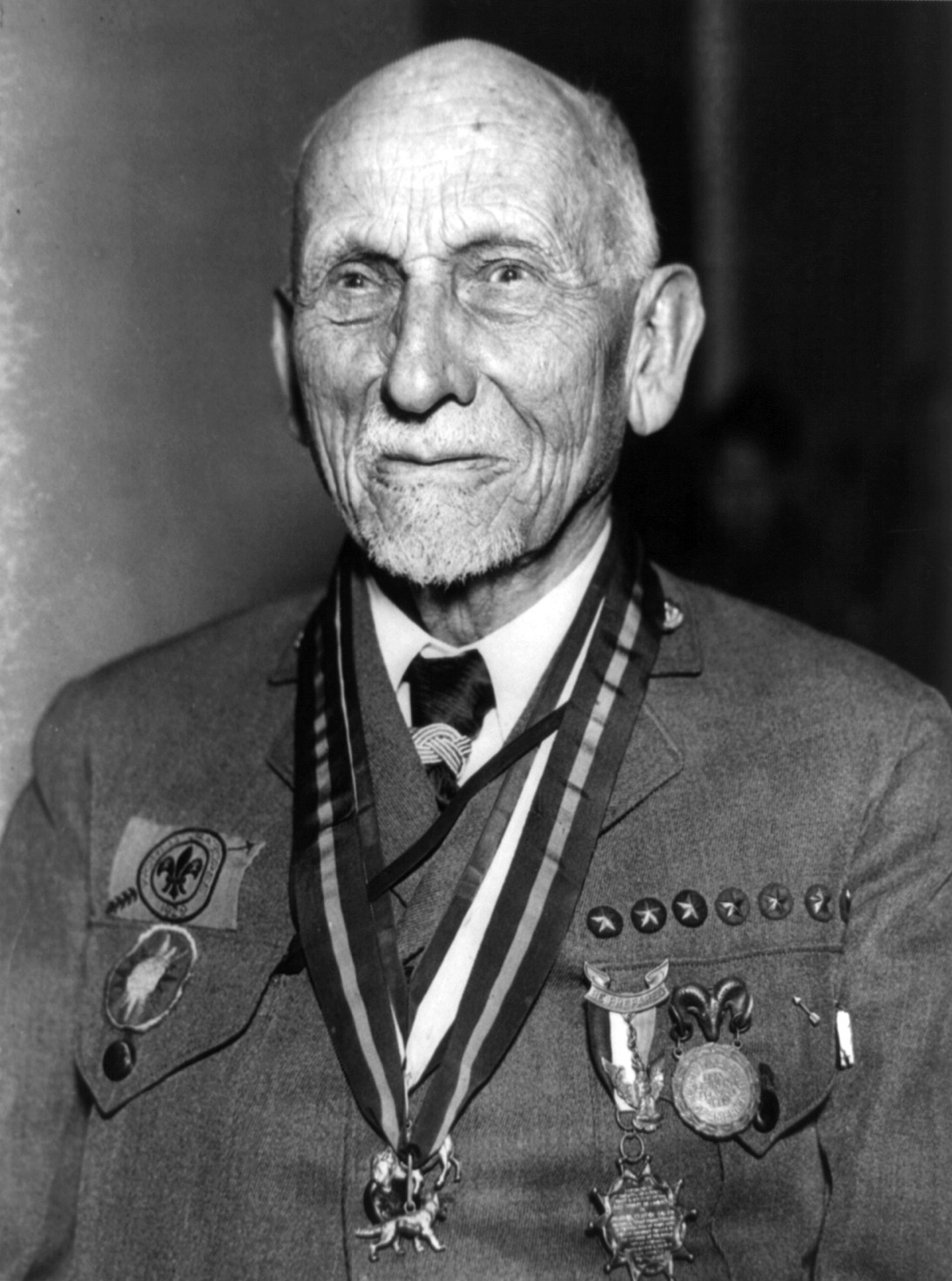
Daniel Carter Beard

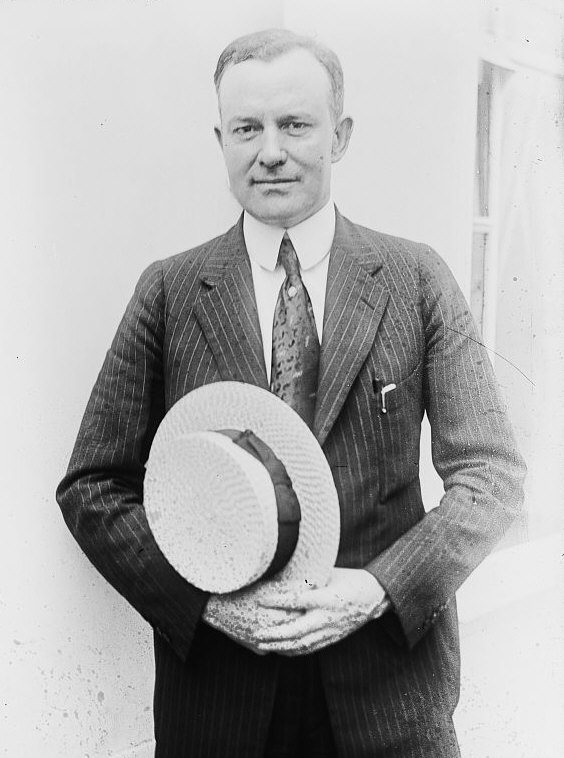
Walter W. Head

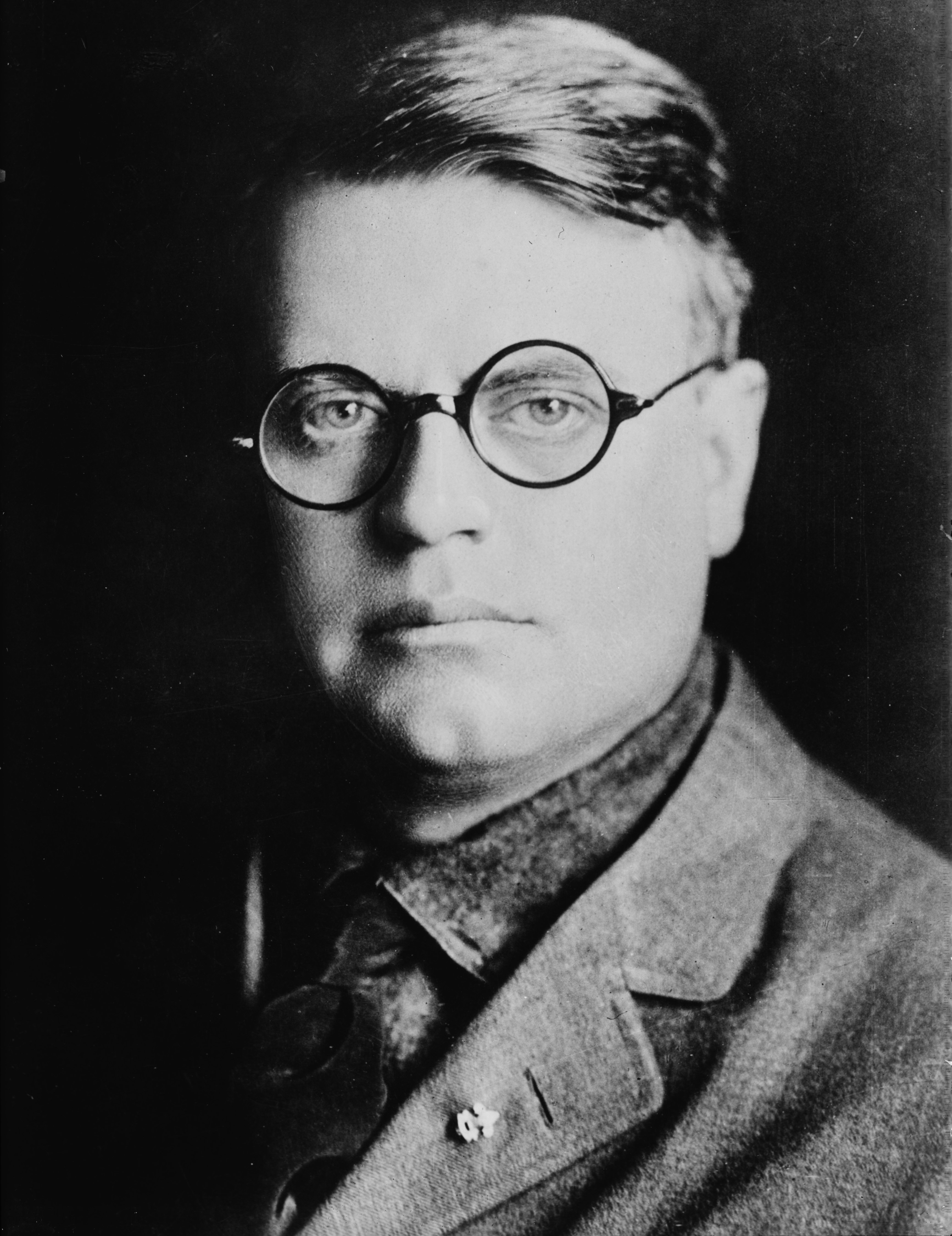
James E. West

== Service, non-profit and religion ==
Name	Original chapter	Notability	Ref.
Michael Archy Aquino	Psi	Founder of Temple of Set	
Scott Beale	Mu Alpha	Founder and chief executive officer of Atlas Service Corps	
Elbert R. Curtis	Iota Psi (Honorary)	Ninth general superintendent of the Young Men's Mutual Improvement Association of the LDS Church (1938–1948)	
William J. Hadden	Mu Iota	Minister of the Christian Church (Disciples of Christ) and priest of the Episcopal Church (United States), member of the Greenville, North Carolina city council	
George R. Hill	Iota Psi (Honorary)	Seventh general superintendent of the Sunday School organization of the LDS Church (1949–1966)	
Martin Luther King Sr.	Psi Omicron (Honorary)	Baptist pastor, civil rights leader, and father of Martin Luther King Jr.	
Oscar A. Kirkham	Iota Psi (Honorary)	General authority in the LDS Church and one of the seven presidents of Seventy (1949–1958)	
W. Walter Menninger	Zeta	President and CEO of the Menninger Foundation (1993–2001)	
Edwin Vincent O'Hara	Gamma Xi (Honorary)	Bishop of the Roman Catholic Diocese of Great Falls (1930–1939), bishop of the Diocese of Kansas City (1939–1956), raised as a personal archbishop in 1954	
Elizabeth Platz	Epsilon Mu (Honorary)	Lutheran pastor, first woman in North America ordained by a Lutheran church body	
Hamer Reiser	Iota Psi (Honorary)	First Assistant to the general superintendent of the Sunday School organization of the LDS Church (1949–1952)	
Earl Stallings	Xi Sigma	Baptist minister and civil rights activist, signer of the "A Call For Unity" letter.	
A. Latham Staples	Zeta Omega	Founder and chairman of the Empowering Spirits Foundation	
Howard Thurman	Zeta Upsilon (Honorary)	Theologian, author, and leader during the Civil Rights movement	
Leonard H. Tower Jr.	Alpha Chi	Free software activist, founding board member of the Free Software Foundation	
S. Dilworth Young	Iota Psi (Honorary)	General authority of the LDS Church (1945–1981)	

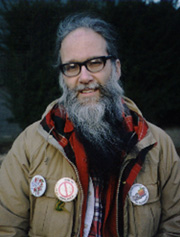
Len Tower

== Sports ==
Name	Original chapter	Notability	Ref.
Lonnie Bartley	Phi Zeta	Women's Basketball Coach at Fort Valley State University; most wins for any Women's Basketball Coach at an HBCU	
Walt Bellamy	Psi Omicron (Honorary)	Professional Basketball Player for six NBA teams (1961–1974); Four time NBA All-star	
Red Blair	Beta Mu	American football and basketball player, coach, and college athletics administrator	
Mike Garrett	Alpha Kappa	1966 Heisman Trophy winner for University of Southern California. Played in the NFL for the Kansas City Chiefs and San Diego Chargers. Former Athletic director for USC.	
John F. (Jack) Green	Theta Mu Advisor	Two time All-American college football player, later head coach at Vanderbilt University (1963–1966)	
Jim Hayes	Theta Tau advisor	Coach and founder of UT Arlington Mavericks men's wheelchair basketball and Gold Medalist at 1984 Summer Paralympics	
Esther Jones	Alpha Epsilon	Sprinter who won an Olympic gold medal in the 4 x 100 metres relay in 1992 Barcelona	
Bob Love	Kappa Lambda	Professional Basketball Player for the Chicago Bulls and other NBA teams (1966–1977); Director of Community Affairs for the Chicago Bulls (1993— )	
Biggie Munn	Phi Advisor	Michigan State University Football Coach (1947–1953), Athletic director (1953–1971)	
Bo McMillin	Mu (Honorary)	American football player and coach at the collegiate and professional level.	
Elmer Tarbox	Beta Sigma	Co-MVP of 1939 Cotton Bowl Classic. Member of the Flying Tigers. Awarded the Silver Star, Purple Heart. Member of Texas House of Representatives (1966–1976)	
War Eagle IV	Delta (Honorary)	Mascot of Auburn University (1964–1980)	
War Eagle V	Delta (Honorary)	Mascot of Auburn University (1981–1986)	
War Eagle VI	Delta (Honorary)	Mascot of Auburn University (1986–2006), part of Opening Ceremonies at 2002 Winter Olympics	
Sidney Williams	Kappa Lambda	NFL player for the Cleveland Browns, Washington Redskins, Baltimore Colts, and Pittsburgh Steelers (ca. 1964); US Ambassador to the Bahamas (March 1994 – September 1998). President and chief executive officer of the Williams Group. Member of the board of directors of OneUnited Bank. Husband of Maxine Waters; US House Member from California	
Gilbert Laverne "Gibby" Welch	Beta	College football All-American and Professional football player	
John Wooden	Chi (Honorary)	Head Basketball Coach University of California, Los Angeles (1948–1975). Coach for 10 NCAA Basketball championships. Member of Basketball Hall of Fame	
Fielding H. Yost	Gamma Pi Advisor	University of Michigan Football Coach (1901–1923, 1925–1926), University of Michigan Athletic director (1921–1942)	

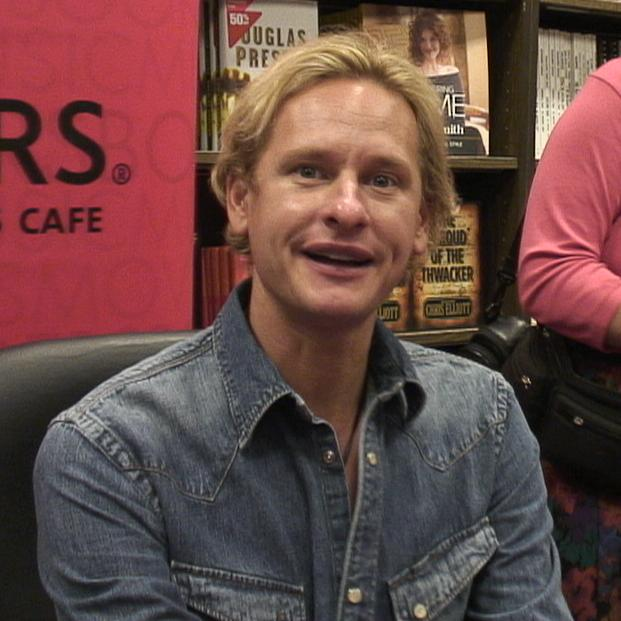
Carson Kressley

== See also ==
- List of Eagle Scouts (Boy Scouts of America)
- List of notable Scouts
