= Roundy =

Roundy may refer to:

- Roundy's
- Roundy Crossing, Arizona
- Roundy (surname)
- Roundy Coughlin
