= Chief Owasippe =

Chief Owasippe is the main subject of a legend with origins in Western Michigan near the Manistee National Forest and the town of Whitehall, Michigan. The legend tells the story of a local Native American chief whose sons left on a journey to Lake Michigan via canoe. When the time came for his sons to return home, he climbed to a high spot overlooking the river that they left from, usually the White River or Silver Creek, and sat there awaiting the arrival of his sons. After waiting in the same spot for several days, Owasippe died, he was buried in a seated position in the spot where he died overlooking the river. Years later, a group of boys discovered the bow of a canoe emerging from the ground, when the site was uncovered, the remains of two boys were found along with various artifacts, the site was not far from where Owasippe had died. While there are slight variations between versions of the legend, most of the main elements remain common throughout. The legend is also the source of the name for the nearby Boy Scouts of America camp, Owasippe Scout Reservation.

== Legends of Owasippe's Death ==
=== Legend of Burying ground Point - by Fred Norman ===
One of the first written accounts of the story came from a Whitehall shopkeeper by the name of Fred Norman. Originally written in 1898 in White Lake Reminiscences by Norman himself, His account was later expanded upon many years later in 1950 by a relative of his, Ms. Bernice Norman. Fred Norman tells the story of "Burying Ground Point" about three miles outside of Whitehall. His tale is of a nameless aged chief who had two sons that were the pride of his life, his sons took a day trip down Silver Creek, a branch of the White River, and into Lake Michigan. As the sun set and it came time for his sons to come back, the old chief climbed to a bluff looking over Silver Creek where he died and was buried while he waited for his sons return. Years later, some boys were fishing when they saw the tip of a canoe emerging from the ground, when it was excavated two canoes were found with various artifacts and the skeleton of two boys who had been determined to be Native American based on the artifacts they were discovered with.

=== 1919 Legend of O-wa-sip-pe ===
The 1919 legend is the earliest known written usage of the Owasippe name in a legend. This legend differs the most from all the retellings of the story of Owasippe, and was first published in a 1919 Owasippe Scout Reservation camp promotion brochure.

==== 1919 Legend ====
O-wa-sip-pe was one of the most beloved of old Chieftains, and many are the stories of his career. In one of their war expeditions, two young sons of Chief O-wa-sip-pe led the war party against their enemies, but the battle was against them and they never returned. The great loss grieved the old Chief so much that he died of a broken heart.

=== 1940 Legend of Owasippe ===
In 1940 a new legend appeared, this legend was a lot closer to the Fred Norman account than the 1919 legend, and included previously unknown information such as the age of Owasippe's children, when white settlers first came to the area, that he married late in life, etc.

The 1940s legend also goes into detail about the canoe trip, it explains that the trip would take a month and be a test of their manhood to become fully installed in the tribe. The boys take off down Silver Creek, to the White River onto White Lake, then into Lake Michigan heading north to the Algonquins in Canada. The ending of the 1940s legend is similar to that of the current legend, where he waits, stops eating, and eventually dies.

The legend goes on to state that Owasippe was buried on the crest of his hill, only marked by a sunken hole. This hole evidence of a raid by vandals several years ago where the skull of Chief Owasippe was stolen. Scouts are encouraged to bring rocks whenever they visit the grave so that in time this hole will be filled, and the mound will mark the spot where the old chief is buried.

=== Legend of Burying ground point - 1950 Revision ===
In 1950 Bernice Norman added many things to Fred Norman's story including the name Owasippe itself and how Fred Norman had heard of the legend. Fred Norman heard the legend from a local Native man by the name of John Stone when asked about a nearby burial mound. She also added more detail about the discovery of the canoe. According to Bernice Norman, three boys, Glenn Stewart, Erastus Monroe, and Patrick Riley, were hiking along the mouth of the Silver Creek when they notices the tip of a canoe coming from the earth. Once the site was excavated the skeleton of two teen boys were found along with artifacts including a copper kettle and metal parts of a flintlock gun. This account closely matches a news report from the area in August 1885 when a local newspaper, "The Whitehall Forum" reported on the discovery of two skeletons found in a buried canoe near the Whitehall area.

=== Modern Owasippe Legend ===
The version of the legend of Owasippe currently used, mainly by the Boy Scouts at Owasippe Scout Reservation, has some differences from the original account by Fred Norman. This version tells the story of a Potawatomi Chief who had married late in life and had two sons. When his sons came of age they left home and traveled down the White River, into the White Lake, and into Lake Michigan, eventually coming to Fort Dearborn. When enough time had passed Owasippe climbed to a tall hill overlooking the White River and sat and waited for his sons to return. He sat there for many days until he eventually refused food from his people, after days of waiting he died in a sitting position and was buried looking down the White River. Years later some young boys were hiking when they saw the tip of a birch bark canoe poking from the ground, when they returned with men and shovels they found that the canoe held the bones of two young boys, this site was less than a mile from where Owasippe had died. The Fort Dearborn part of the legend most likely came about as a way to connect the scout camp's name to Chicago, due to its ownership by the Chicago Area Council.

== Other Legends of Owasippe ==
=== Indian Legend of White Lake the Beautiful - 1925 ===
In 1925 a man named John Reed wrote a story called, "The Indian Legend of White Lake the Beautiful." This legend which is based on recollections John had as a child, involves Chief Owasippe. Owasippe and his grandson "Deer-Foot," would on occasion come to John's family store. In this legend John recalls a story Owasippe told him as a child.

==== Excerpt from the legend ====
The old chief, besieged for a story, told the youngsters of a wise and good "Sachem" who lived a long time ago. In the twilight of his life, the Sachem was asked to help negotiate a peace settlement between two warring tribes, which he did. Shortly after, according to Chief Owasippe, the Sachem was called home to the "Happy Hunting Grounds." His body was prepared according to custom, placed in his canoe and set adrift down a river, with the members of the tribe hoping it would be guided to his wigwam. The canoe drifted down the river for many hours until it finally "floated out upon the bosom of a beautiful lake." The mourners had followed the canoe and were startled by the sight of many birds in the sky with white and silver wings. They were also astonished to see that the color of the lake had changed from blue to a silvery white. According to Chief Owasippe’s story, the tribe members all exclaimed at once: "Wab-a-gun-a-gee, Ne-bis, Bis-e-gain-dang." "White Lake--The Beautiful."

== Origin of Owasippe Name ==
The name "Owasippe" most likely came from the local natives name for the White River during the time period,"Waba-sippi", which would have been written out by the French when they came across the area as "Ouabisippi".

=== First recorded usage of Owasippe Name by the Boy Scouts ===
The first known usage of the Owasippe name was recorded by the Boy Scouts in 1915. In 1915 J.P. Fitch of Oklahoma was brought on board by the Chicago Council to run the then, "Camp White."

Fitch who was very familiar with the usage of Native American traditions in his home state founded, "The Tribe of O-wa-sip-pe," this program honored campers based on how many years they camped on the reservation. 1st year campers were Messengers, 2nd year Braves, 3rd year Warrior, 4th Hunter, and 5th Chief. To promote the program the camp was renamed Ow-as-sip-pe; and White Wing, a full blooded Winnebago Indian was brought on staff to assist with crafts. A few years later Fitch was promoted to another council. When Fitch left, the program died out, but the camp retained its Owasippe name.
