= James Fitch =

James Fitch may refer to:

- James P. Fitch (1887–1964), notable in the early history of the Boy Scouts of America
- James Fitch (minister) (1622–1702), instrumental in the founding of Norwich and Lebanon, Connecticut
- James Marston Fitch (1909–2000), architect and preservationist
