= Senator Biddle =

Senator Biddle may refer to:

- Charles Biddle (1745–1821), Pennsylvania State Senate
- Jack Biddle (politician) (1930–2024), Alabama State Senate
- Nicholas Biddle (1786–1844), Pennsylvania State Senate
- W. Craig Biddle (1931–2018), California State Senate
- Ward Gray Biddle (1891–1946), Indiana State Senate
