= Wilderness Grace =

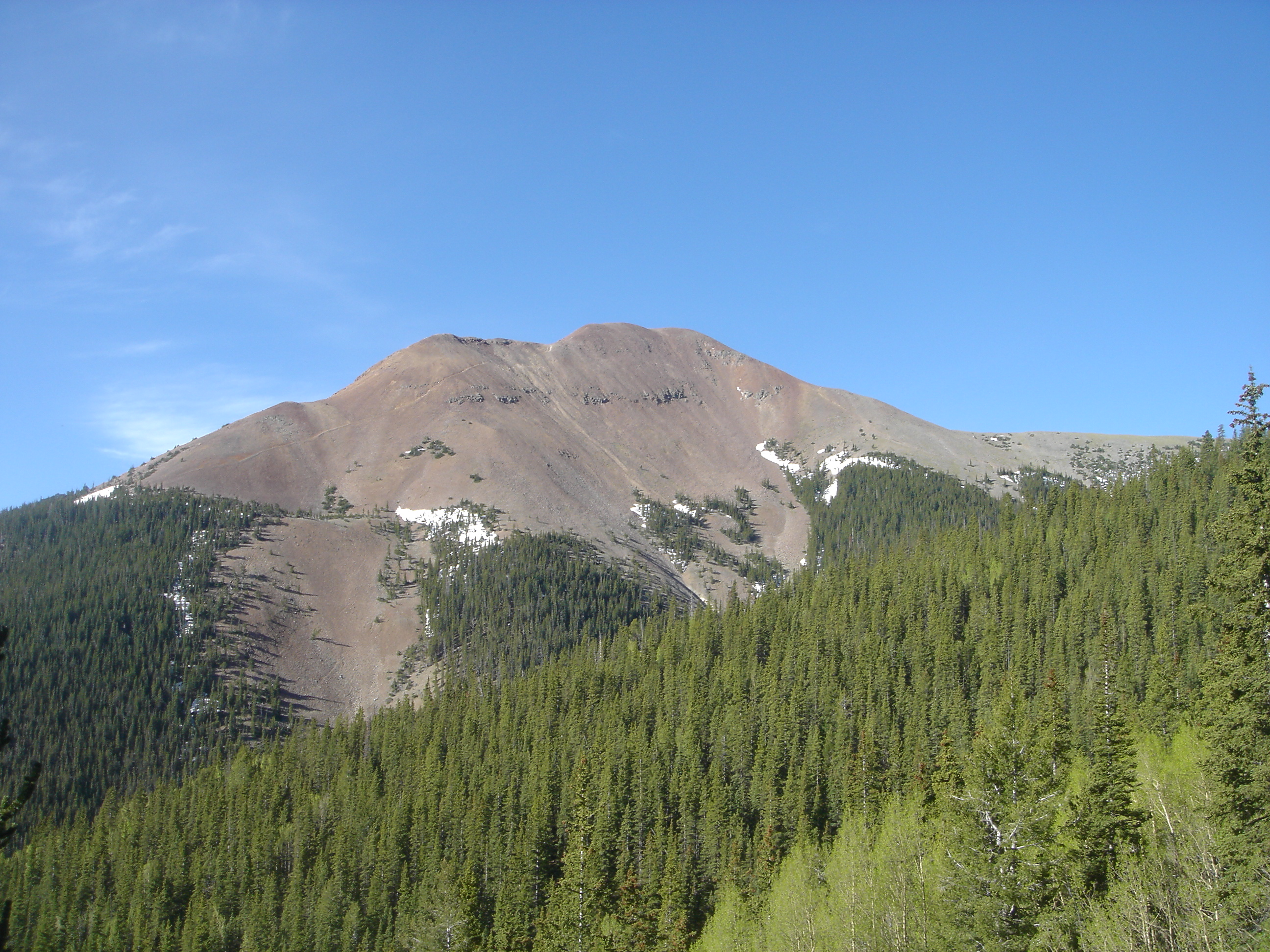
Mount Baldy at Philmont Scout Ranch

The Wilderness Grace, also known as the "Worth Ranch Grace" and the "Philmont Grace", is the common name of a simple prayer recited before meals by many members of Scouting America. The original version, the "Worth Ranch Grace", was written in 1929 by A. J. "Jerry" Fulkerson, Camp Director at Worth Ranch Scout Camp in Palo Pinto County, Texas, part of the Longhorn Council in the Fort Worth Area. Fulkerson was also the Scout executive of the Fort Worth Area Council.

The Wilderness Grace in its most commonly used form is as follows:

For food, for raiment,
For life, for opportunities,
For friendship and fellowship,
We thank Thee, O Lord. Amen.

== The Worth Ranch Grace ==
The version of the Worth Ranch Grace that most Worth Ranch Scouts are familiar with is:

For food, for raiment,
For life, for opportunities
For friends and this fellowship,
We thank Thee, O Lord. Amen.

Note that in the present version of The Worth Ranch Grace that the third line is different from "The Wilderness Grace" and refers to "this fellowship" which is a reference to the "Worth Ranch fellowship" which is a line in The Worth Ranch Song, written by Faust Nobles.

=== The Original Version ===
The current version of The Worth Ranch Grace is slightly different from the original version:

For food and for raiment,
For life and for opportunity,
For friends and this fellowship,
We thank Thee, O Lord. Amen.

Note that the first two lines are different from either the contemporary version or the "Wilderness" version. This original version is copied here verbatim from a handwritten copy of The Worth Ranch Grace written on a small piece of note paper by James P. Fitch, Region Nine Scout Executive, during a trip to Worth Ranch in the 1930s. Fitch was later General Manager of Philmont Scout Ranch and Phillips Properties of the Boy Scouts of America. At the top of the paper, also written in Fitch's handwriting, is the title "The Worth Ranch Grace." Fitch kept this filed away in his copy of the small book "Songs Scouts Sing." This is probably the earliest surviving written copy of "The Worth Ranch Grace."

=== James P. Fitch ===
James P. Fitch was Region Scout Executive for Region Nine (Texas, Oklahoma and New Mexico) from 1920 to 1945 when he became General Manager of Philmont Scout Ranch, Cimarron, New Mexico, and Phillips Properties for the B.S.A. Fitch was the man who encouraged Waite Phillips generosity to Region Nine throughout the 1930s, and accepted the gift of Philturn Rocky Mountain Scout Camp in 1938, and later the larger gift of land in December 1941 that became Philmont Scout Ranch. If it were not for Jim Fitch's interest in recording The Worth Ranch Grace as it was used in the 1930s, we would not have this earliest version.

=== Minor Huffman ===
The origin of The Worth Ranch Grace was corroborated by Minor S. Huffman, Sr., the first General Manager of Philmont Scout Ranch in his book High Adventure Among the Magic Mountains: Philmont, the First 50 Years. In that book, Huffman wrote, "Worth Ranch was definitely the earliest camp to use the Grace." Huffman recalls hearing The Worth Ranch Grace on a visit to Worth Ranch in 1930 with Dr. James E. West (Scouting), Chief Scout Executive from 1911 to 1943; James P. Fitch, Region Scout Executive; and Frank Wozencraft, Region Chairman of Region Nine. (This may have been the visit by Fitch when he made his handwritten copy of "The Worth Ranch Grace.") This visit in 1930 was the occasion of the official dedication of Worth Ranch, although the Ranch had been in operation for over a year. That dedication ceremony is recorded on film, and may be the only visit to the Ranch by the renowned Dr. West.

=== Faust Nobles ===
In his book, Huffman recalled that at the time of their 1930 visit to Worth Ranch they thought The Worth Ranch Grace was written by Faust Nobles, a member of the Worth Ranch Camp Staff during its first decade, and a Field Scout Executive of the Council. Nobles was well known for his talent at writing verse, both in poetry and in song. But in the spring of 1980, prior to the 50th Anniversary celebrations of Worth Ranch, Nobles denied writing The Worth Ranch Grace and identified Jerry Fulkerson as its author. Nobles also served as head Scout Executive of the Cimarron Valley Council. Nobles also wrote "The Worth Ranch Song," and, in 1947, wrote a poem titled "Novitiate" about Philmont Scout Ranch.

=== Clarence Dunn ===
Another piece in the puzzle was filled in by Minor Huffman when he confirmed that The Worth Ranch Grace was brought to Philmont in the summer of 1943 by Clarence E. Dunn, a Worth Ranch Scouter and a Scoutmaster from the Fort Worth Area Council. Dunn, a school teacher, became a member of the Philmont Staff in the summer of 1945 with the position of Personnel Director. Dunn developed the Ranger Program and held the position of Chief Ranger for 26 years until his retirement at the end of the 1970 season. If it were not for Clarence Dunn, The Worth Ranch Grace would have never been introduced to thousands of Philmont Scouts from every part of the world over the past decades. Dunn was later honored by having an elementary school in Arlington, Texas, named for him.

=== Epilogue ===
Because of its continued use at Philmont Scout Ranch since the 1940s, The Worth Ranch Grace has been carried home to every corner of the U.S. where it has become widely known by two different names: "The Wilderness Grace" and "The Philmont Grace."

=== Northern Tier Wilderness Grace ===
The Northern Tier National High Adventure Bases, have modified and added to the Wilderness Grace for use in its canoeing programs:

For food, for raiment,
For life and opportunity,
For sun and rain,
For water and portage trails,
For friendship and fellowship,
We thank Thee, Oh Lord. Amen.

Northern Tier staff claim the Grace originated with them 90 years ago and that Philmont adopted and adapted by dropping the third line, as there's little water and no portage trails in New Mexico.

=== The Summit Bechtel Family National Scout Reserve ===
The Summit Bechtel Family National Scout Reserve has also modified the Wilderness Grace for use in its high adventure/Jamboree programs:

For this time and this place,
For Your goodness and grace,
For each friend we embrace,
We thank Thee, O Lord. Amen.

== See also ==
- Scout prayer
