= Worth Ranch =

Ranch in Palo Pinto, Texas

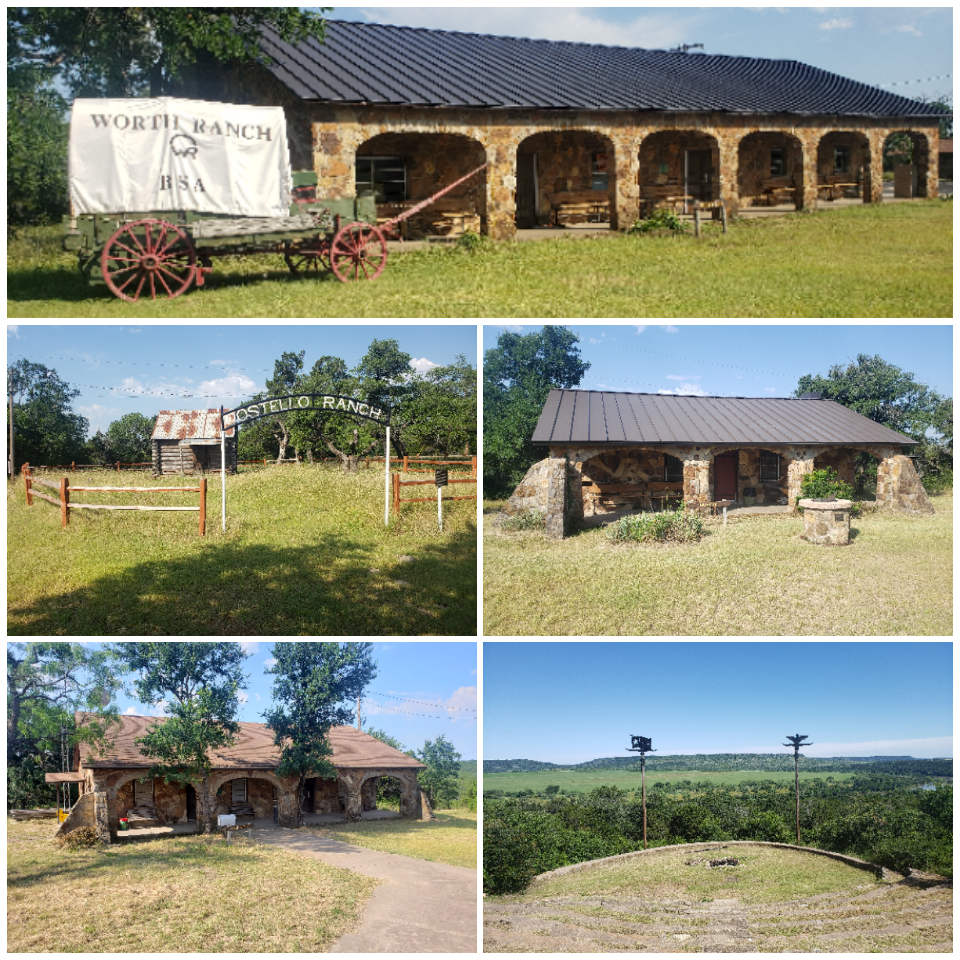
- Top: Roser Hall, Clockwise from mid left: Costello Ranch, Shuman Building, Councilring, Landreth Lodge

- Owner: Longhorn Council
- Location: Palo Pinto, Texas
- Coordinates: 32°48′58″N 98°19′01″W
- Founded: 1929
- Founder: A.J. Fulkerson
- Website worthranch.com

Worth Ranch, commonly abbreviated to WR, is a ranch located in Palo Pinto, Texas (roughly 60 miles west of Fort Worth). It is owned and operated by the Longhorn Council of the Boy Scouts of America (BSA). It is approximately 750 acres in size.

Worth Ranch is used primarily as a Scout reservation and camping ground. Year round scout units can camp at Worth Ranch, while during the summer, Worth is known for its summer camp operations, The Big Adventure. Worth Ranch is also commonly known for being the origin of the Wilderness Grace.

== Aquatic school ==
The ranch hosts an annual aquatic school. Scouts have attended it since 1944, though the current school was not officially started until 1954.

== History ==
The Camp opened sometime in the 1930s, after land was purchased for it in 1929. $45,000 of funds were raised to open the camp. Scouts began attending the camp in 1929. The first groups of scouts for summer camp attended the week of June 9, 1930. A tribute dedicated to it occurred on June 15, 1930.

On June 23, 1940, the county of Palo Pinto dedicated the ranch with $26,000 of improvements.

In July 1949, the A.J. Fulkerson Memorial Chapel on the ranch was dedicated.

Originally around 280 acres in size, Worth Ranch has since expanded through the generous donations to its current size of just under 750 acres.

On August 24-25, 2026 the Ross Fire burned land on and around Worth Ranch, with the campground sustaining catastrophic damage.
