= Roundy (surname) =

Roundy is a surname. Notable people with the surname include:

- David Roundy (born 1973), American physicist
- Eddie Roundy (1891–1954), American football, basketball, baseball, and ice hockey coach
- Shadrach Roundy (1789–1872), early Latter Day Saint leader
