= Roy Ellis =

American college president (1888–1972)

- Born: March 9, 1888; Seymour, Missouri, US
- Died: January 9, 1972 (aged 83); Springfield, Missouri, US
- Occupations: College president and academic
- Years active: 1917–1961

Academic background
- Education: Fourth District Normal School, A.B., 1911 University of Missouri, B.A. and B.S., 1914; Harvard University, M.A., 1917 Columbia University, Ph.D, 1930
- Thesis: Civic History of Kansas City, Missouri

Academic work
- Discipline: Education
- Sub-discipline: History and economics
- Institutions: Missouri State University

Roy Ellis (March 9, 1888 – January 9, 1972) was an American academic administrator. He was president of what is now Missouri State University for 35 years, noted for overseeing a significant period of campus building and student growth.

== Early life ==
Ellis was born on March 9, 1888, in Seymour, Missouri, the seventh of eight children. His father was David Franklin Ellis, a preacher. He grew up on a farm in Wright County, Missouri. He attended New Grove School, a one-room school in Wright County, through the eight grade. He then attended Hartville High School for three years. In 1906, Ellis began teaching at a rural school in Wright County at the age of eighteen, before graduating from high school.

He took classes at William Jewel College. Ellis enrolled in the Fourth District Normal School in Springfield, Missouri in 1909, graduating from the two-year program with an A.B. in 1911. While there, he was a member of the debate team.

Ellis received a B.A. and a B.S. from the University of Missouri in 1914. While at Missouri, he studied law and education, joining Phi Delta Phi and Phi Beta Kappa honor societies. He received a master's degree from Harvard University in 1917. He received a Ph.D. from Columbia University in 1930 for his dissertation Civic History of Kanas City, Missouri.

== Career ==
Ellis was the principal of Texarkana Grammar School in Texarkana, Arkansas, from 1911 to 1912. He then taught history at the State Normal School in Warrensburg, Missouri. From August 1914 to 1916, he was superitendant of the Greenfield, Missouri Schools, including Greenfield High School and Greenfield Grade School.

In 1917, Ellis became an instructor of history at the Fourth District Normal School. In 1918, he became the head of the Department of Sociology and Economics. He left the college for six months in 1919 serve as a sergent in the United States Army during World War I, after training at the Calvary School in San Antonio, Texas.

Ellis became its third president on February 2, 1926, when the Normal School was called Southwest Missouri State Teachers College. Under his leadership, the college was accredited in 1927 and became Southwest Missouri State College in 1946. The three-building campus expanded to include Agricultural Building, Classroom Building, the Fine Arts Building, the Industrial Education Building, the library, Men's Residence Hall, the Science Hall, the Student Center, Women's Residence Hall, and the fieldhouse and stadium, now called McDonald Arena. He served through August 31, 1961, making him the longest tenured president in the history of what is now called Missouri State University. When he retired, enrollment at the college had grown from 900 in 1926 to 3,400 students in 1961.

Ellis was a member of the Missouri State Teachers Assocation and the National Education Association. He wrote several books, including Manual for the Study of the Principles of Economics, Manual for the Study of Economic Problems, and Shrine of the Ozarks, a History of Southwest Missouri State University from 1905 to 1965.

== Honors ==
Ellis was made an honorary president of the Beta Mu chapter of Alpha Phi Omega at Southwest Missouri State Teachers College in January 1939. On June 7, 1960, Ellis received an honorary doctorate from the University of Missouri.

The Fine Arts Building of Missouri State University was built in 1959 and named Ellis Hall in his honor. Currently housing the Department of Music, it was the first building on campus that was named for a person.

In February 1972, the Southwest Missouri State University board of regeants established the Roy Ellis Scholarship in his memory.

== Personal life ==
Ellis and his wife, Frances Myrtle Nations, had a son named Davis Owens Ellis. They lived in Springfield, Missouri, in a house that was across the street from the college.

Ellis was a member the American Legion, the Downtown Kiwanis, the Missouri Historical Society, and the University Club. He was a member of First Baptist Church.

Ellis died on January 9, 1972, in St. John's Hospital in Springfield at the age of 83. He was buried in Greenlawn Mausoleum.
