= Jason Ivy =

American singer-songwriter (born 1996)

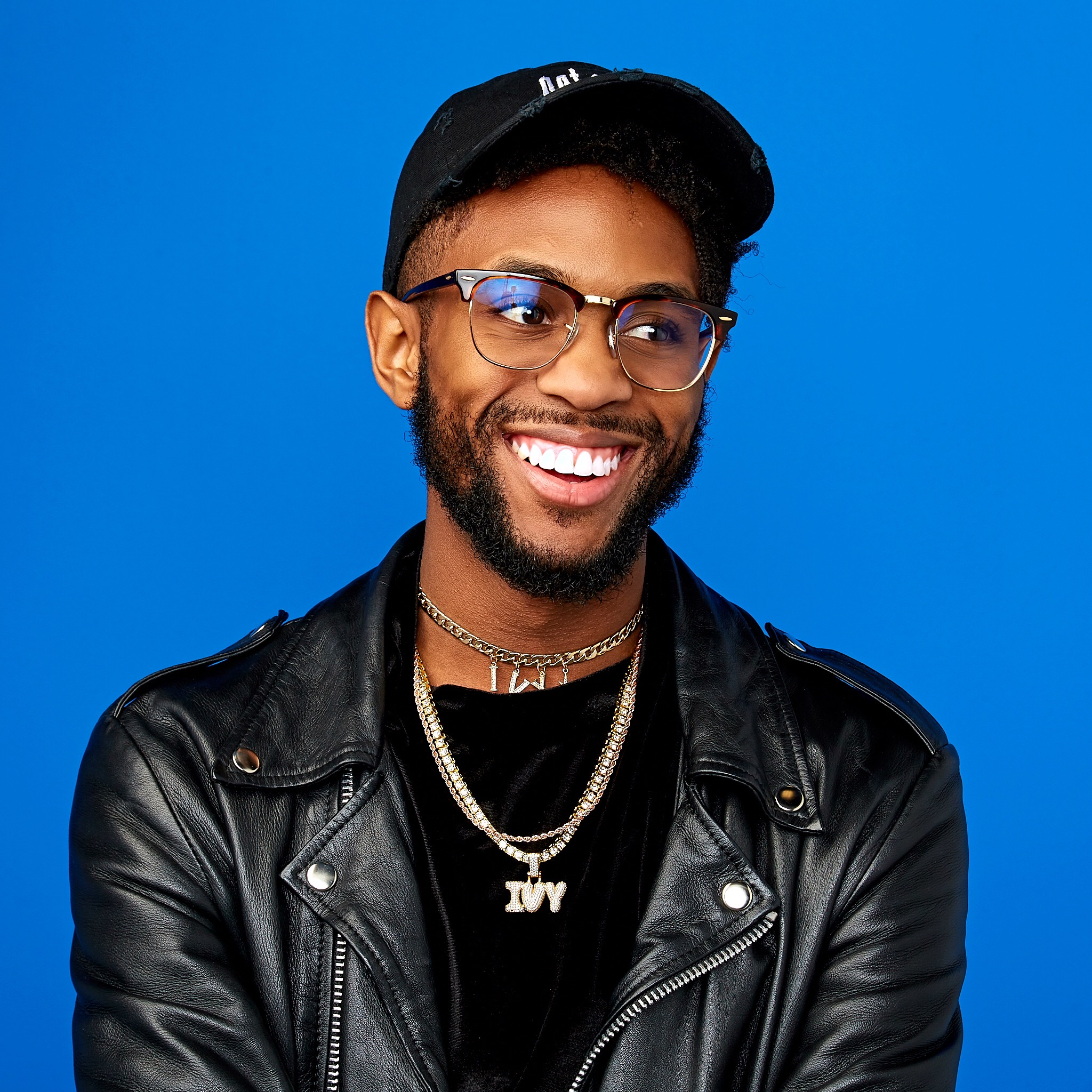

Background information
- Born: Jason Victor Roberts; 1996 (age 29–30); Chicago, Illinois, USA
- Genres: R&B; hip hop; neo soul
- Occupations: Singer, Songwriter, Producer, Rapper, Actor, Entrepreneur, Philanthropist, Polyglot
- Years active: 2017–present
- Label: Jason Ivy LLC
- Website: jasonivy.com
Jason Ivy
- Education: University of Pennsylvania

Jason Victor Roberts (born December 9, 1996), known professionally as Jason Ivy, is an American singer, songwriter, rapper, and actor.

Born in Chicago, Illinois, Jason Ivy began to gain mainstream recognition in late 2018, after releasing his first studio recorded single, "Higher," which gained admiration from both peers and established artists like Majid Jordan. He then released his first EP project, CØMPLIMENTS, on February 9, 2019, which garnered critical acclaim. It earned him placement in Billboard Magazine.

In addition to his solo career, Jason Ivy has worked with members of the Chicago collective SaveMoney, and is a member of the University of Pennsylvania based artist collective, The Collctve.

== Early life ==
Jason Victor Roberts was born in Chicago, Illinois. His father, Ted Roberts, was a Chicago Police Officer for 30 years. His mother, Jan Kruel, is a State Farm Insurance Agent of over 35 years. Roberts grew up in the middle-class neighborhood of Marquette Park, on Chicago's South Side.

First homeschooled, he was taught the basics of American education to prepare him for attendance at Westside Preparatory School (WPS) established by American Educator Marva Collins. Skipping preschool and kindergarten, he began first grade at three years old and attended WPS until the school closed down just after his 7th grade year in 2008.

He then attended St. Paul Lutheran Church and School in Oak Lawn, Illinois, for one year to complete his middle school education. St. Paul School is now closed until further notice, as of 2018.

Jason went on to attend Urban Prep Charter Academy for Young Men in Chicago’s Englewood neighborhood. During his time there, he was triple enrolled at Kennedy King Community College and the University of Chicago, and studied abroad at the University of Cambridge. Throughout his high school days, Roberts founded an anti-violence organization, and was a featured speaker at several non-violence events. He was extremely involved in his education, participating in programs like the Center for Companies that Care’s Aim High Program, winning several awards from his commitment to academic success.

When Roberts was sixteen, he moved to Philadelphia, Pennsylvania, to attend the University of Pennsylvania, where he studied cognitive neuroscience and minored in linguistics. He received his degree in December 2017 and returned home to Chicago to pursue music full-time.

== Music career ==
Roberts’ interest in music began at a very young age, when he would sing along to whatever was playing on the radio. Growing up, Roberts’ parents consistently played music across a large span of genres. His father enjoyed music, owning a large catalog of digitally downloaded albums and physical CDs.

Jason’s favorite songs as a child were "I Wanna Know" by Joe, "Keep Ya Head Up" by Tupac, and "If I Ain’t Got You" by Alicia Keys. He grew up on the music that the older generation enjoyed, and this influenced his soulful, melodic sound. The Chris Brown and Mariah Carey concerts he attended as a child may have shaped his perspective on musical artists as well. Jason began writing poetry and songs as early as eighth grade, when he noticed the apparent link between written poetry and musical rhythm.

In his freshman year of high school, Roberts tried his hand at music production as part of a Technology class centered on Apple products. Naturally, he learned his technique on Garageband, and produced his first instrumental for the class final. His production was compared to that of Kid Cudi, who he played heavily during his high school days, along with Alternative Rock bands like My Chemical Romance, Green Day, Kings of Leon and many others.

Roberts started performing live in venues across the Chicago area with the Soul Children of Chicago. This acclimated him to the concepts of live performance and touring, with long hours of practice, sound checks, and extensive travel time.

At the University of Pennsylvania, Jason continued to advance his music career, adding a cappella to his growing repertoire. He joined The Inspiration A Cappella Group as a tenor.

Roberts then left The Inspiration to join The Collctve and explore the more collaborative side of music with “a diverse network of creatives, risk-takers, innovators, and collaborators coast to coast.” (2) Jason recorded two songs with them, titled “Freshman Cypher” and “Don’t Mind.”

=== 2018: Career beginnings and Higher ===
During a self-exploratory gap year from UPenn, Roberts underwent formal musical training for the first time in his life, with Rev. Dr. Lena McLin, the woman responsible for the musical education of Whitney Houston, Jennifer Hudson, and R. Kelly.

After graduating from UPenn, Roberts returned home to Chicago to being writing drafts for his first EP, CØMPLIMENTS. In April 2018, Jason began the process of incorporating himself as Jason Ivy LLC, with the help of the legal team at DiSchino & Schamy, PLLC in Miami, Florida. This process was finalized in May 2018, and Jason officially began his career in the music industry, surrounded by the familiar scenery and local artists of his hometown.

Roberts recorded, mixed, and mastered his first single, “Higher,” exclusively at Classick Studios with the help of engineers Bryan Schwaller and Elton L10 Chueng. “Higher” received over 100,000 streams on Spotify and Soundcloud combined in under one week of its initial release, as well as praise from musical talent around the world.

=== 2019 — Present: CØMPLIMENTS EP ===
CØMPLIMENTS, read: Empty Compliments, is the first EP project from Jason Ivy. While it encompasses a wide array of sounds, its genres can best be described as Neo Soul, R&B, and Lo-fi Hip Hop.

The cover art for the album is as stimulating, visually, as the music. “Each icon represents one of the six songs from the project. In order, they are: Hate (the spiteful message and angered posture of the astronaut), Foreign (the astronaut itself), Higher (the rocket), Chlorophyll (the sunflowers), Ivythemoon. (the ivy leaves), and Pyre (the woman with the burning heart).”

Jason Ivy explains that the “concept behind both the EP and the cover art is that these are all separate concepts that function as a whole, all mostly contained within this jar. Each of the songs addresses the state of the jar — being emotionally empty or filled — which doubles as a graphic metaphor for the state of the narrator’s own emotions.” It is apparent Jason uses his extensive education to clearly convey meaning through the mediums of art and music.

== Artistry ==
=== Musical style ===
Roberts’ music has been described as smooth and uplifting, taking listeners “Higher.” His music generally consists of RnB-fueled melodies and harmonies, and Gospel-influenced runs and melismas.

Roberts’ lyrics are extremely illustrative, often walking listeners through a complete train of thought with multiple double and triple entendres along the way. His musical style and instrumentation makes for chill, easy listening, but his lyrics provoke through and reflection, often addressing real life problems rather than reciting the music industry standard of “money, women, cars, clothes, and jewelry.” Jeff Mitchell at Odd Nugget has described Roberts’ lyrics as “sonic fire with a chill flame.”

Though he may rap from time to time, the majority of Roberts’ music consists of traditional singing songs. Jason possesses a lyric-dramatic tenor voice with an expansive vocal range that covers 4 octaves. Roberts’ vocal range reaches its extreme low nearing vocal fry at the bass low B (B1), and rises to its high at the soprano C (C6) in falsetto.

=== Fashion ===
Roberts’ fashion style is a significant part of his public image, and he has taken interest in the industry for many years. He is part owner of the “No Homo Company” a fashion line dedicated to the reclamation of the deleterious homophobic phrase “no homo” for the LGBTQ+ community. This company illustrates Roberts’ ally-ship for the aforementioned community.

In addition to the No Homo Company, Roberts has designed apparel for college student groups, as well as all of his own artist merchandise.

=== Personal life ===
Roberts lives on the Southside of his hometown, Chicago, Illinois. He leads a relatively normal life outside of music.

=== Family ===
His younger brother, Brayden Roberts, is also working on gaining a footing in the music world, by writing and producing music as a hobby. Brayden is credited on the first song of CØMPLIMENTS, “Hate,” as a songwriter. His younger brother, Brayden, is currently an undergraduate student at the University of Minnesota — Twin Cities.

=== Spirituality ===
After being confirmed as a Lutheran in eighth grade, Roberts refers to himself as a Christian. Roberts was raised as a Christian by his parents, and later went on his own spiritual journey, studying various religions and their origins throughout his free time in high school. He later settled on Taoism and Zen Buddhism as models for how to live his life due to their introspective natures, in addition to Christianity.

Roberts often credits “the Universe” for his success and career opportunities, as a more open way to convey to others his belief in a higher being.

=== Activism and politics ===
Roberts is a Democrat, and both of his godfathers, Congressman Bobby Rush and Senator William Marovitz, are Democratically oriented politicians.

Roberts served as an election judge during high school, and was a lively participant in voter activism. Throughout his career, Roberts has completed over 600 hours of community service, through his affiliation with the National Honor Society and his fraternity organization, Alpha Phi Omega.

== Discography ==
EP

- CØMPLIMENTS (2019)

- 2020 W.A.M. Awards Best Album nomination.

- Deep Cuts (2020)

== Filmography ==
- Road to Perdition — extra
- SELF Magazine Documentary, Breaking the Cycle of Stress and Psoriasis (2020)
