= Louis H. Renfrow =

US general (1896–1979)

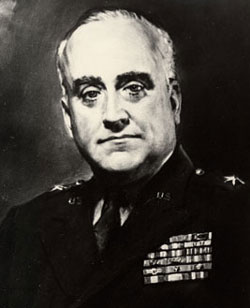

Louis H. Renfrow (October 5, 1896–December 22, 1979) was a Military Aide to the President from 1947 to 1949 during the presidency of Harry S. Truman.

He served as Chief Liaison and Legislative Officer, Selective Service System from 1946 to 1948. From 1949 to 1950, Renfrow served as Special Assistant to the Secretary, Department of Defense, and from 1950 to 1957 was Deputy Director, Selective Service System. He originally was a member of the Missouri National Guard, serving in the dental corps. He was a brigadier general. Renfrow was born in Cairo, Illinois.
