= Roundy Coughlin =

- Born: Joseph Leo Coughlin; September 18, 1889
- Died: December 9, 1971 (aged 82)
- Other names: Roundy
- Occupation: Sports columnist
- Employer: Wisconsin State Journal

Joseph Leo "Roundy" Coughlin (September 18, 1889 – December 9, 1971) was a sports columnist from Madison, Wisconsin who wrote primarily for the Wisconsin State Journal. Most of his bylines were simply "Roundy." His column, "Roundy Says," was the newspaper's most popular column.

While Roundy was running a pool hall on Madison's State Street, he earned a reputation for his exceptional knack to predict the outcomes of college football games. A short time after a writer for The Daily Cardinal began quoting Roundy's sports predictions and witticisms uttered in the pool hall, The Capital Times offered Roundy a job writing a weekly column for $5. In 1924, he switched employers to The Wisconsin State Journal, lured by the offer of a roadster with his name on it. Understanding that Roundy would be a major boon for the newspaper, the editors chose to announce his hiring with the entire front page of its second section. He remained with the Wisconsin State Journal until his retirement at the end of the 1970 college football season.

Roundy often wrote in a stream-of-consciousness style, frequently at the expense of proper grammar. His tone is considered to be very relatable because of his background lacking in a traditional education in journalism. An example of this is "A lot of times slot machines spit and you get some money but the parking meters just say so long sucker." Occasionally he wrote other humorous articles outside of sports.

Roundy's charity, the Empty Stocking Club, has raised money for needy children and those with disabilities.

A remarkably breviloquent, spoof interview between Roundy and theoretical physicist Paul Dirac has circulated with the date "31 April," but no actual newspaper was issued on that fake date, and the interview is not attributable to Roundy.

== Bibliography ==
- Coughlin, Roundy (1933). The hand-painted chop suey: Translated from the king's English to the queen's taste. Straus Printing Company.
- Newhouse, John (1968). What More Could Be Fairer: The Story of Roundy. Wisconsin State Journal.
