= James P. Fitch =

American Scouting leader

- Born: July 4, 1887; Montserrat, Missouri, USA
- Died: January 5, 1964 (aged 76)
- Education: Missouri State Normal School
- Occupations: Teacher, Scout Executive

James P. Fitch (July 4, 1887 – January 5, 1964) was a Scouting notable in the early history of the Boy Scouts of America (B.S.A.). He was born at Montserrat, Missouri, and attended Missouri State Normal School (now University of Central Missouri) at Warrensburg. It was there that he met Dr. Elbert K. Fretwell of Teachers College, Columbia University, who was a summer instructor at Warrensburg, and an early leader in the B.S.A. They formed a strong friendship, and Fretwell recruited Fitch to work for the B.S.A. during its first decade.

== Background ==
In 1912, Fitch, a school teacher by vocation, was hired by the B.S.A. to travel on the Redpath Chautauqua circuit. Based in Pittsburgh, Pennsylvania, he spent 2 1/2 years traveling around the mid-west setting up Scout troops in the towns and cities he visited. In 1915, he was hired as Camp Master at Owasippe Scout Camp near Chicago where he was the founder of "The Tribe of Owasippe." When he was not employed at the camp, he was District Scout Executive for the North Shore District in Chicago. In 1917, Fitch was hired as the Council Scout Executive at Columbus, Ohio, and served there through 1919.

In the Fall of 1919, Fitch was appointed Region Scout Executive for Region Nine (Texas, Oklahoma and New Mexico), and he served in that capacity until 1945. During these years, Fitch actively recruited supporters for the Scouting program. In 1938, one of these supporters, Oklahoma oilman Waite Phillips, donated part of his huge Philmont Ranch near Cimarron, New Mexico. This became Philturn Rocky Mountain Scout Camp. Three years later, in December 1941, just days after the Japanese bombing of Pearl Harbor, Phillips donated the rest of his ranch to Region Nine. In 1945, when Fitch retired as Region Nine Scout Executive, Phillips insisted that Fitch be appointed the General Manager of Philmont Scout Ranch and Phillips Properties for the B.S.A.

In the early 1930s, Fitch visited the newly dedicated Worth Ranch Scout camp in Palo Pinto County, Texas, and made a copy of "The Worth Ranch Grace," a simple grace before meals used at the camp. This handwritten copy of The Worth Ranch Grace is in the possession of Pete Normand of College Station, Texas. Normand, a former member of the Worth Ranch camp staff, is the son-in-law of James P. Fitch's only son, William D. Fitch.

During Fitch's twenty-five years as Region Nine Scout Executive, his office was in Dallas, Texas. During these years he was the chapter advisor for the Alpha Omicron chapter of Alpha Phi Omega at Southern Methodist University, a Greek Letter Scouting fraternity.
