= Ward Gray Biddle =

American politician

Ward Gray Biddle (March 23, 1891 – May 28, 1946) was an Indiana businessman, Indiana University administrator, and politician.

== Early life and education ==
Born on a farm in Madison County, Indiana, to parents Charles W. and Nellie (Gray) Biddle, Biddle attended county schools and graduated from Pendleton High School in 1909. He entered Indiana University immediately but did not complete his Bachelor's until 1916.

== Career ==
Upon graduation, Biddle began a series of business positions, serving as assistant secretary of the Pendleton Trust Company (1916-1919), assistant cashier of the Anderson Banking Company (1919-1921), before serving as cashier of the Middletown State Bank, which he also organized and directed until 1923. That year, he returned to Indiana University where he became manager of the bookstore. He held this position through 1936 but along the way also served as the first director of IU's Indiana Memorial Union (1932-1936). In 1936, he became comptroller of the university and in 1937 joined the Indiana University Board of Trustees, serving as secretary of the Board until 1942. As part of a campus-wide reorganization under IU President Herman B Wells, Biddle's title was changed to vice president and Treasurer. He served in this position until his death.

== Political career ==
From 1931 to 1932, Biddle served in the Indiana House of Representatives and in 1933, he served in the Indiana Senate, representing Brown, Greene, and Monroe counties through 1937. During this time, he served as chair of the Committee on Education and as a member on number of committees.

== Monuments and memorials ==
In 1959, the IU Board of Trustees approved renaming the Continuation Study Center - the hotel and conference addition to the Indiana Memorial Union - in honor of Biddle (Biddle Continuation Study Center). In 2002, the Trustees again changed the name to the Ward G. Biddle Hotel and Conference Center to more clearly identify the hotel.
