= List of historic properties in New River, Arizona =

New River, Arizona
- CDP
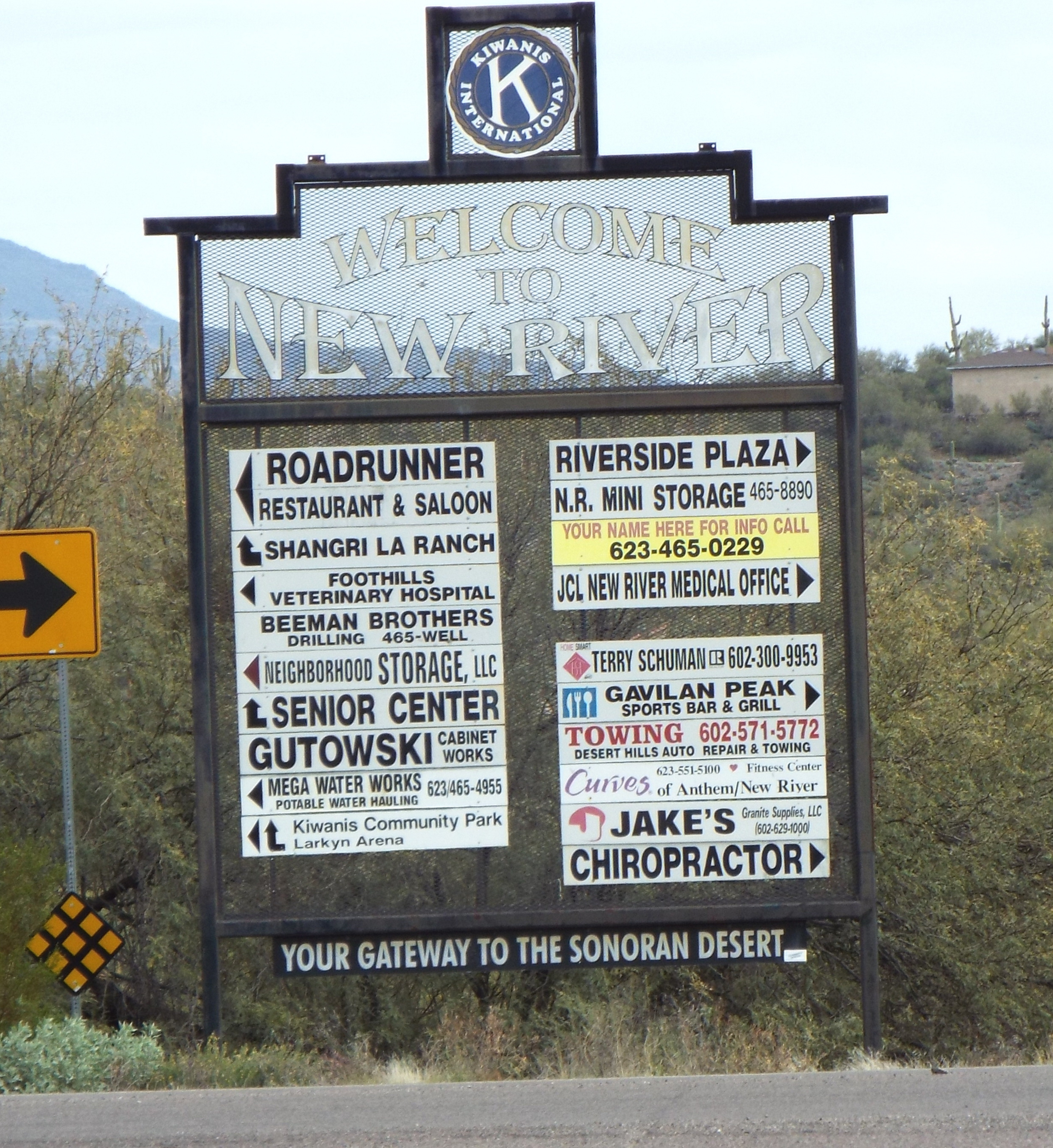
- Welcome to New River

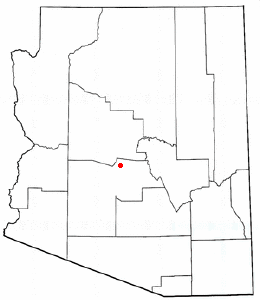
- Location in Maricopa County and the state of Arizona
- Coordinates: 33°52′9″N 112°5′9″W

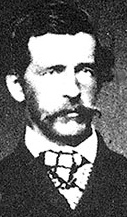
Phillip "Lord" Darrell Duppa

This is a list which includes a photographic gallery, of historic structures of significance in New River, Arizona, a small unincorporated town, founded by Lord Darrell Duppa which served as a stagecoach stop in the 1850s. The town is located on the northeastern slope of the Gavilan Peak, between the towns of Anthem and Black Canyon City on Interstate 17 in Arizona.

== Brief history ==
New River is named after the seasonal wash of the same name, part of the Agua Fria River system which drains into the Salt River.

The New River Mountains are part of a region extending southwards from the southeast of the Black Hills of central Arizona. The region contains mesas, hills, and mountain peaks; the region is bordered on the west by the Black Canyon, where the Agua Fria River flows south towards Phoenix, and on the east, canyons where the Verde River also flows south to enter the Phoenix valley.

=== Early settlers ===
The first known settlers of the area were the Hohokam, a pre-historic Native American tribe. They were the first to establish communities in the area, however for unknown reasons the site was abandoned by 1450 AD.. Later the Tonto Apaches and the Yavapai settled in the region. The Tonto Apache lived alongside the Wipukepa ("People from the Foot of the Red Rock") and Kewevkapaya, two of the four subgroups of the Yavapai of central and western Arizona. Both tribes were hunter-gatherers, they hunted (antelope, deer, birds, bush rats, etc.) and collected (agave, berries, wild plants, seeds).

In 1868, Lord Darrell Duppa, an Englishman who was a pioneer in the settlement of Arizona, founded a stagecoach stop on the northeastern slope of the Gavilan Peak which would eventually become the unincorporated town of New River. The peak is within New River Mountains which are part of a region extending southwards from the southeast of the Black Hills of central Arizona. Soon settlers from the east coast of the United States began to arrive and establish farms and ranches such as the T Ranch, the Y Ranch, and the Spear S Ranch. This was partially due to the passage of the 1864 Homestead Act which provided availability of public lands to the newcomers. For many years the stagecoach stops were the terminus of the old Black Canyon Highway (now Interstate 17). The pavement ended in New River and continued as a dirt road to the city of Prescott.

=== The Miller family massacre ===
The Miller family were among the first settlers. They owned the "Station", the first stage stop established in the area. They also owned a ranch at the base of Gavilan Peak. All seven members of the family were massacred in an Apache raid, precipitating U.S. Cavalry campaigns against the Apaches. The US Cavalry thus became involved in a campaign in the area to protect the settlers from further attacks. They drove out the Apaches and extended the Stoneman Military Trail which was to connect Fort McDowell in Phoenix with Fort Whipple in Prescott. The campaign ended in 1886 and the military established a base on Gavilan Peak. In 1890, the New River Stagecoach Stop was established and later became known as the Wranglers Roost Stagecoach Stop.

== Historic New River ==
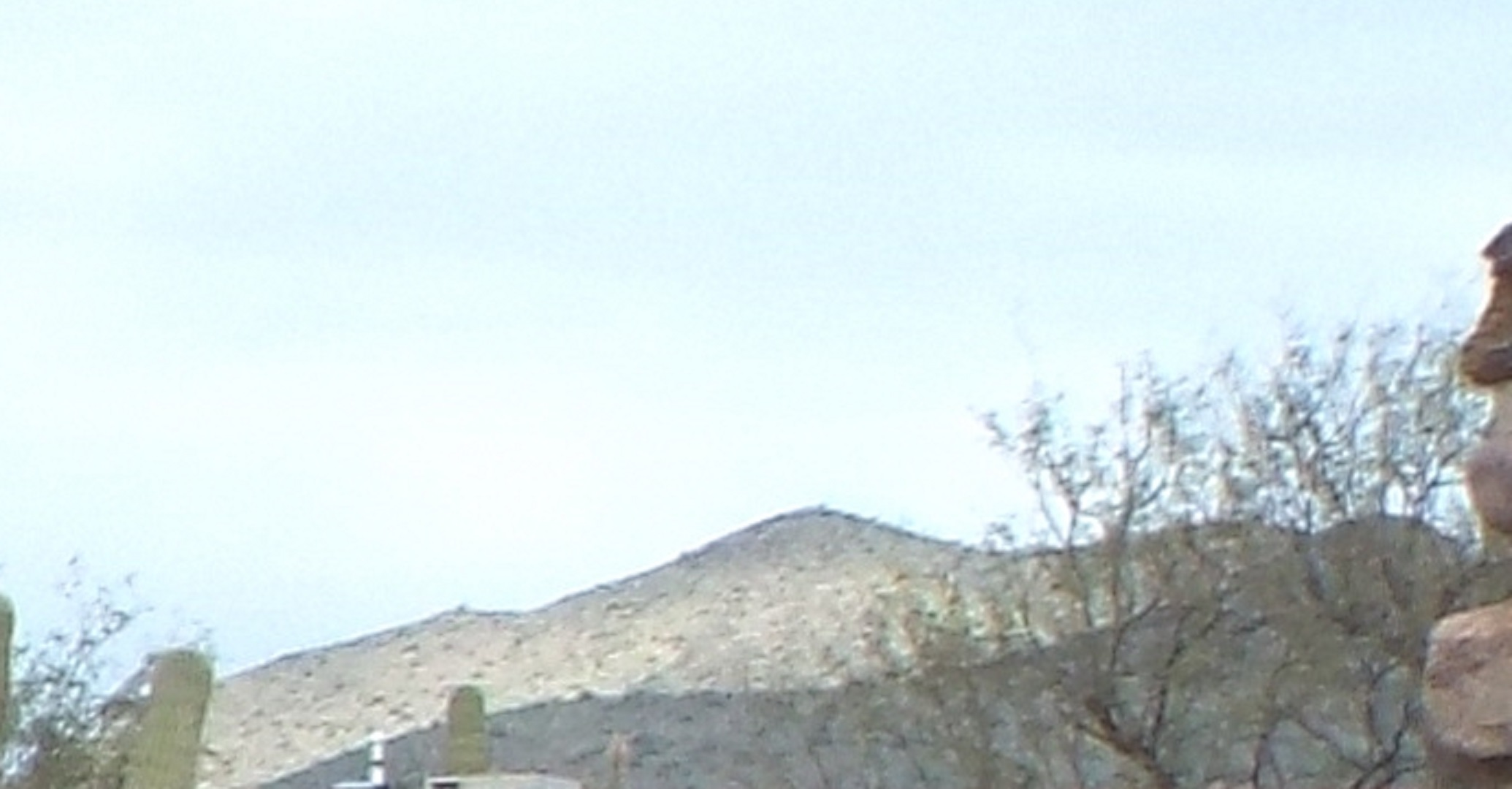
Gavilan Peak

Pictured are some of the few remaining historic structures of New River.

- The Wranglers Roost Stagecoach Stop - This was a New River Stagecoach Stop which was established in 1890. Pictured within the property is the main building which was restored in 1930, plus a stagecoach and wagon that were once used.
- Replica of a Tonto Apache Teepee.
- The Station - located where the first New River Station Stagecoach Stop, was established. During the 1870s, the Desert Station Stage Line connected Phoenix with Prescott. In 1940, a saloon was built. The location, which was once used as a restaurant is at 46202 New River Road.
- General Store - Early 1900s General Store.
- The Jack Ass Acres Service Station - An old abandoned 1930s gas station and convenience store located on the frontage road just off I-17 in New River, Arizona. The structure is within the boundaries of the Sun-Up Ranch which was listed in the National Register of Historic Places on May 23, 1988, reference #88000558.
- Gavilan Peak - It was named in the 1880s, when the U.S. Cavalry and the Apaches fought a battle in the area. The name means 'sparrow hawk' in Spanish and 'hawk' in Apache.
Historic structures of New River, Arizona
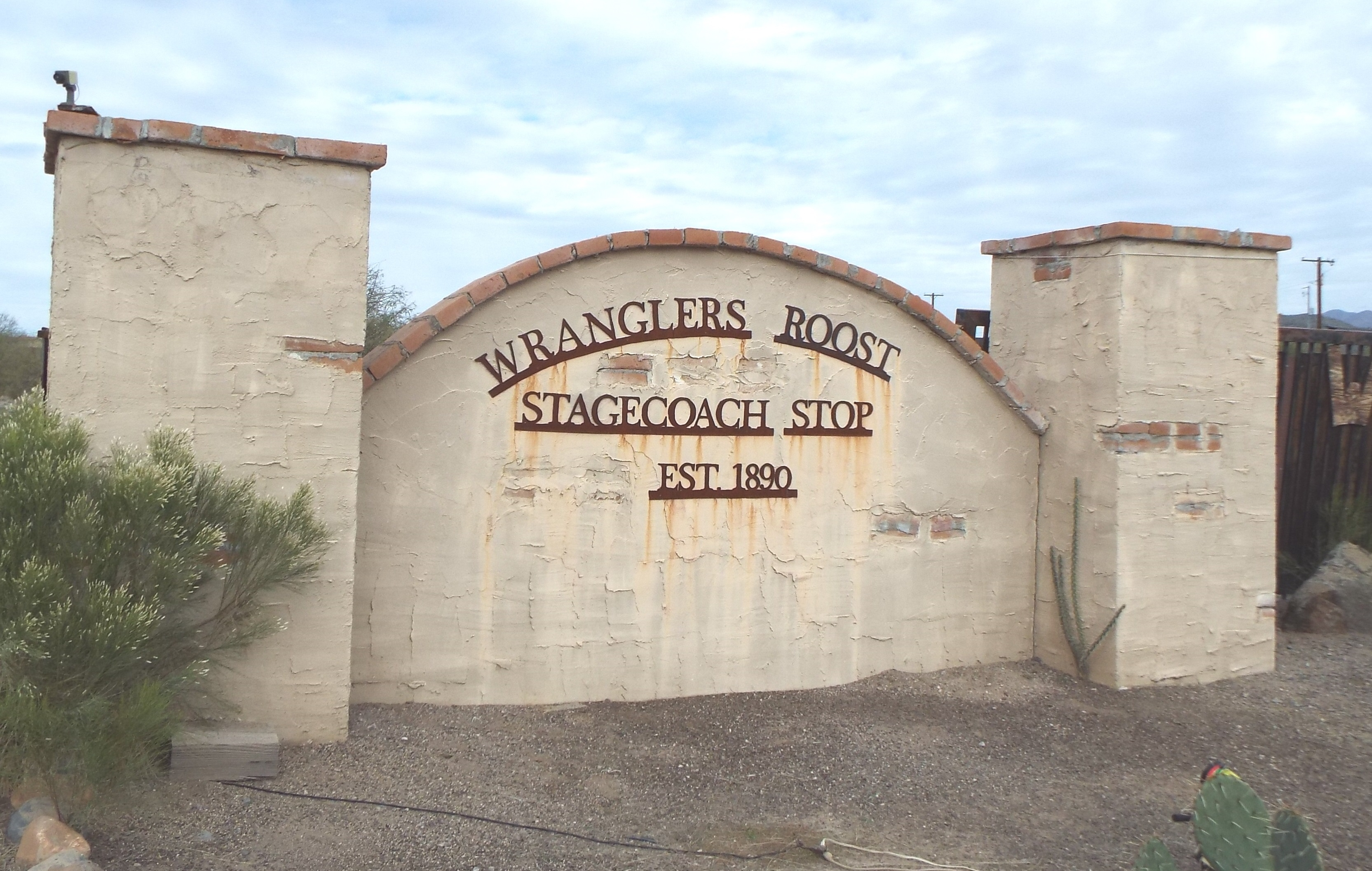
The Wranglers Roost Stagecoach Stop front gate.

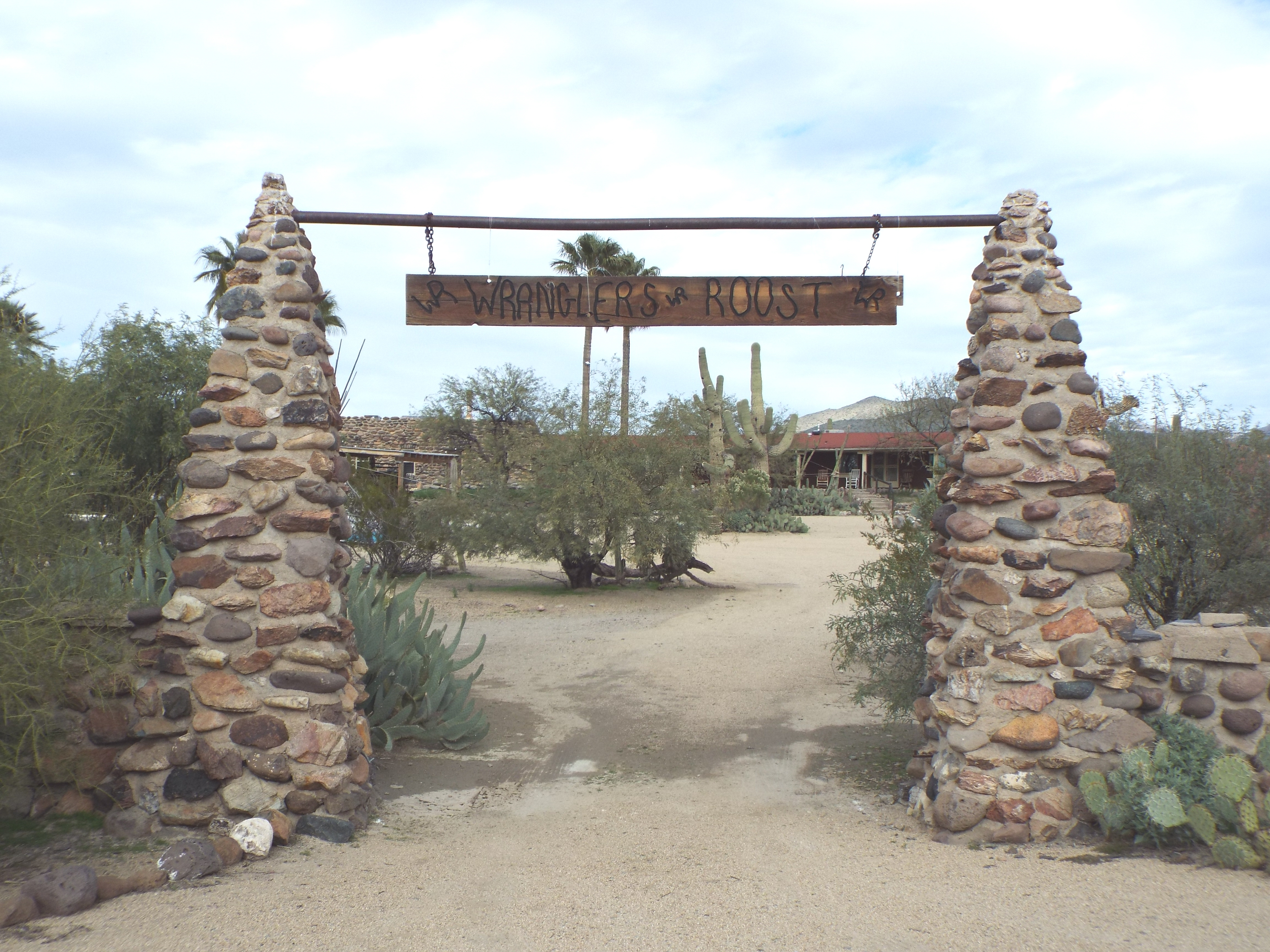
Wranglers Roost Stagecoach Stop entrance.

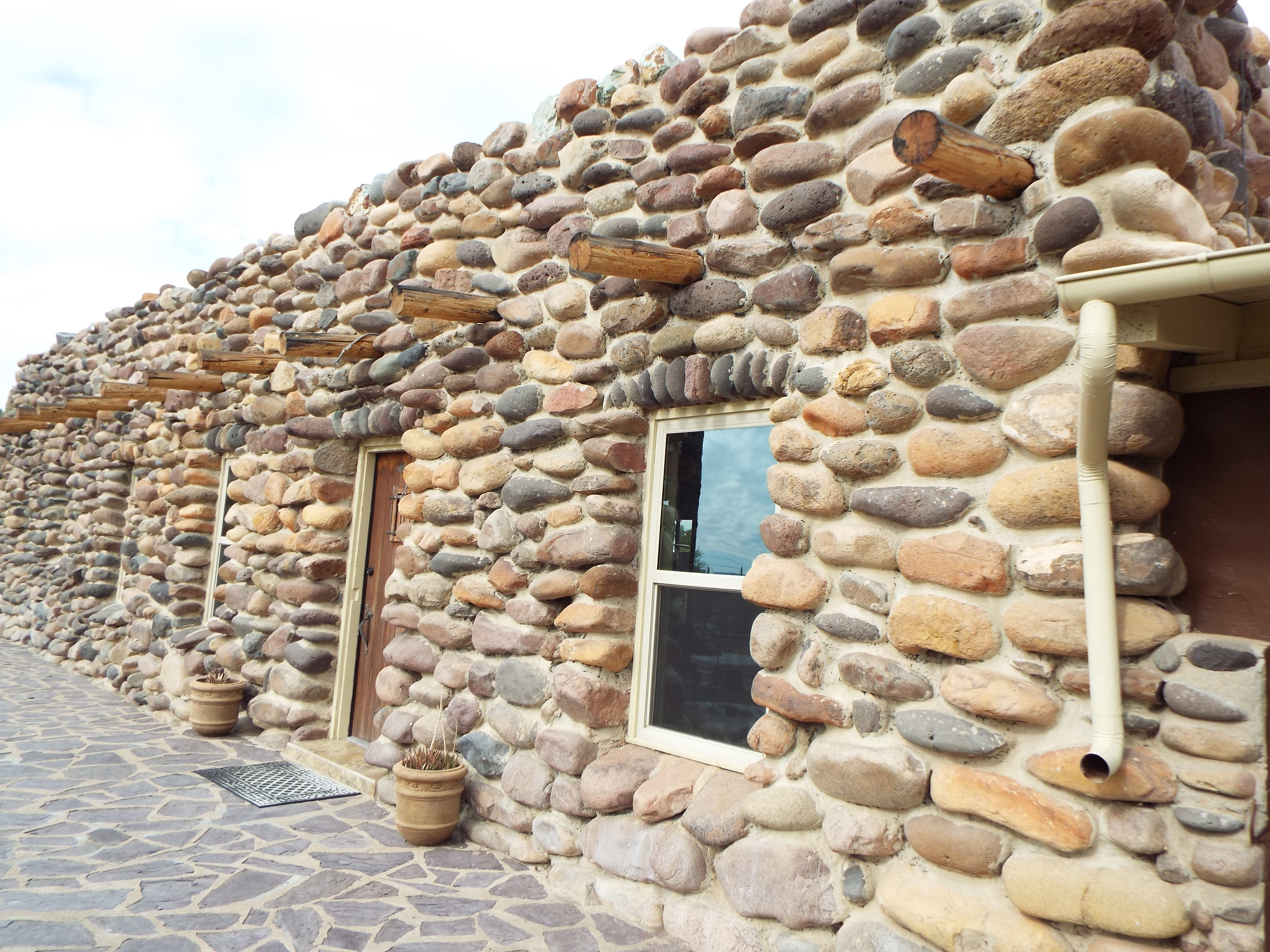
Wranglers Roost Stagecoach Stop main building.

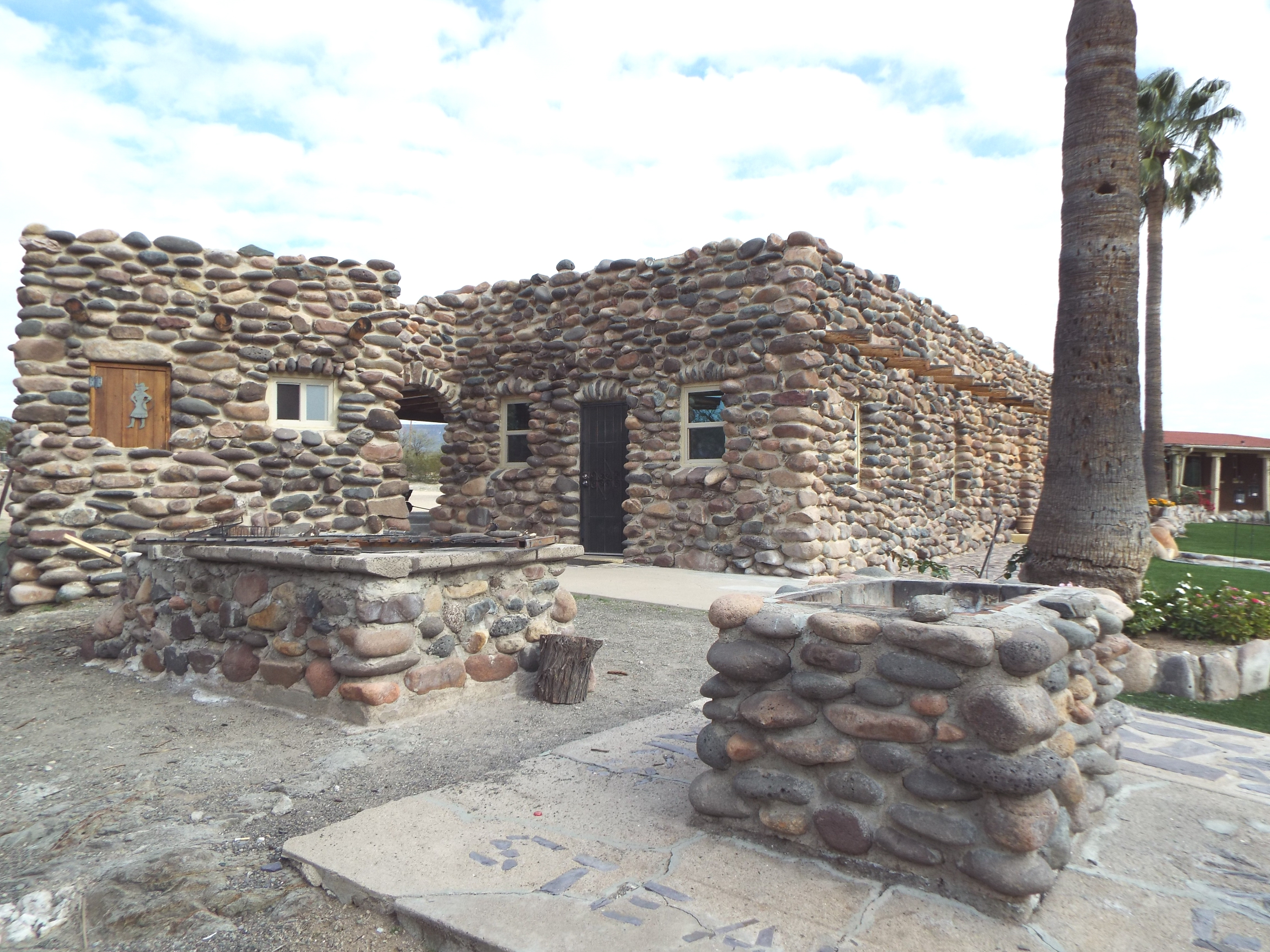
Building and well of the Wranglers Roost Stagecoach Stop.

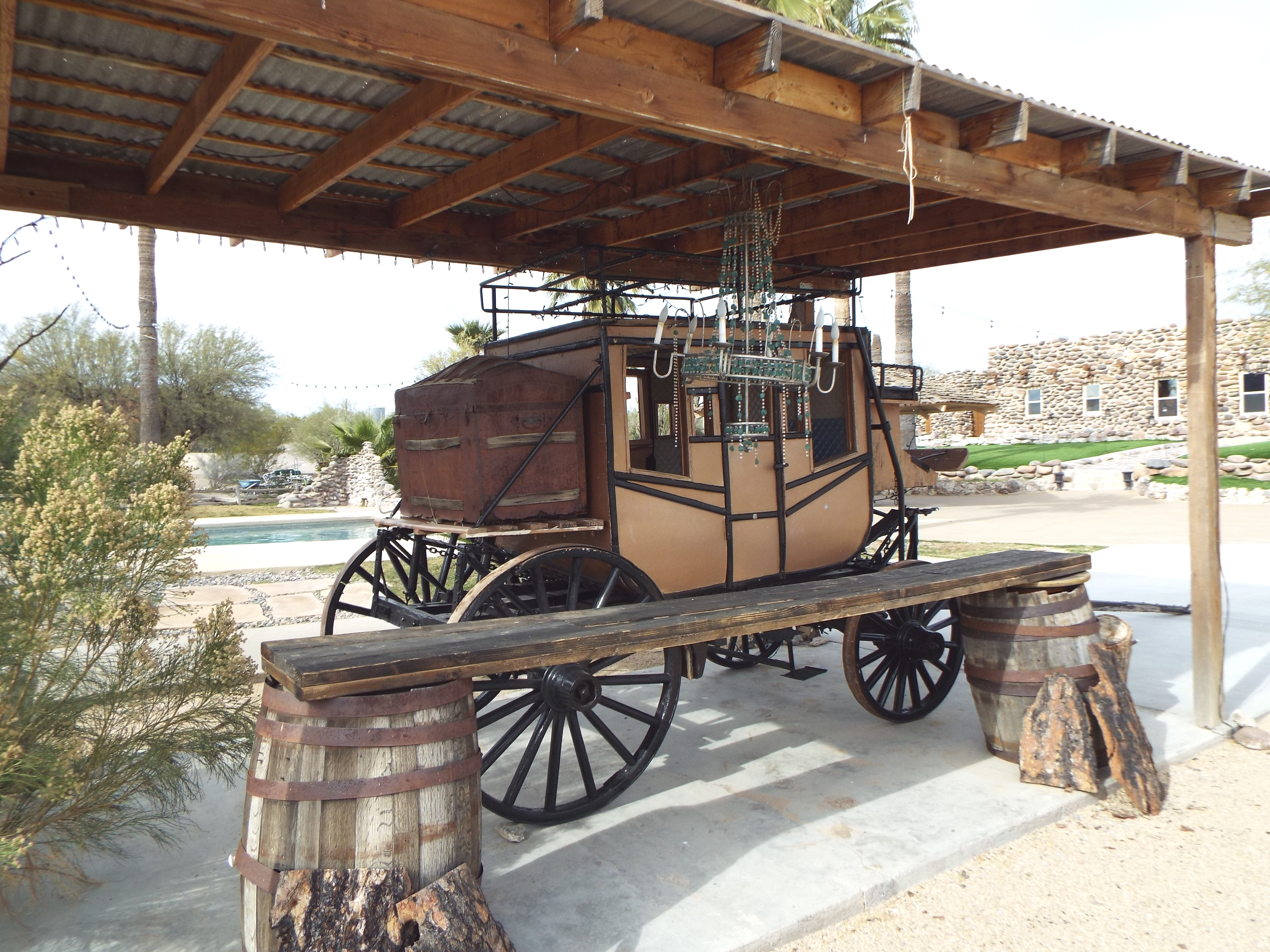
Old Stagecoach.

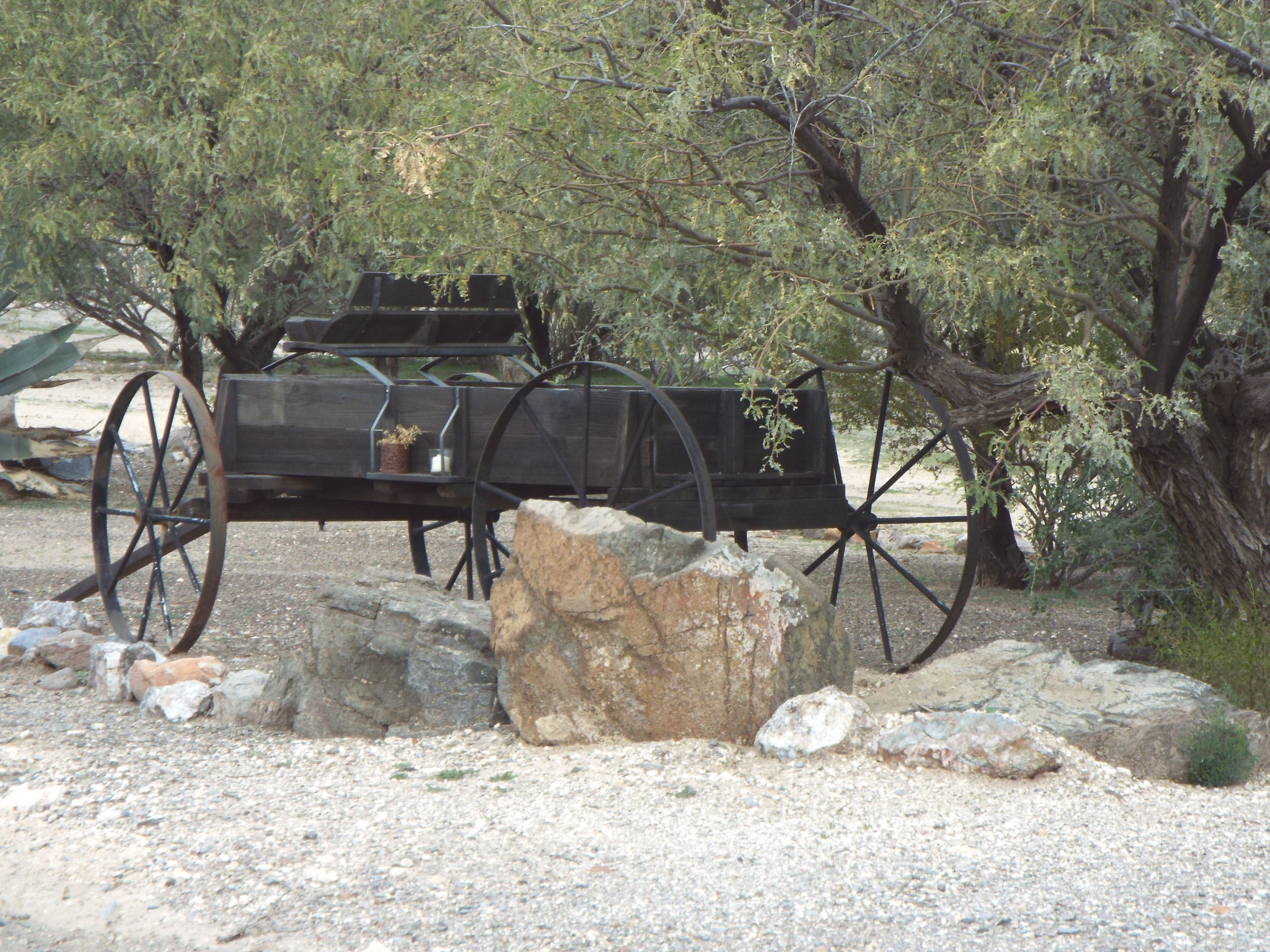
A one horse Farm Wagon.

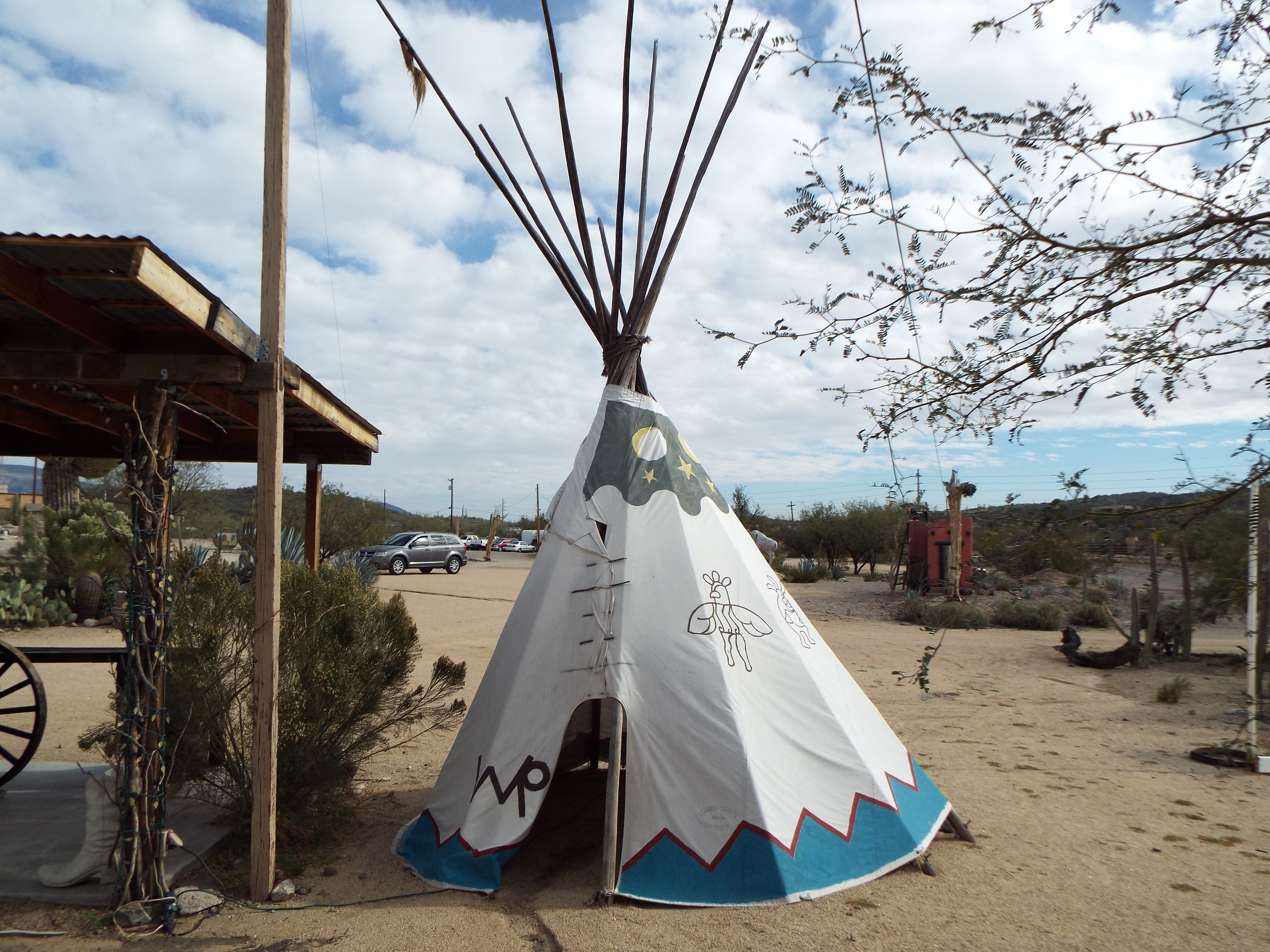
Tonto Apache Teepee.

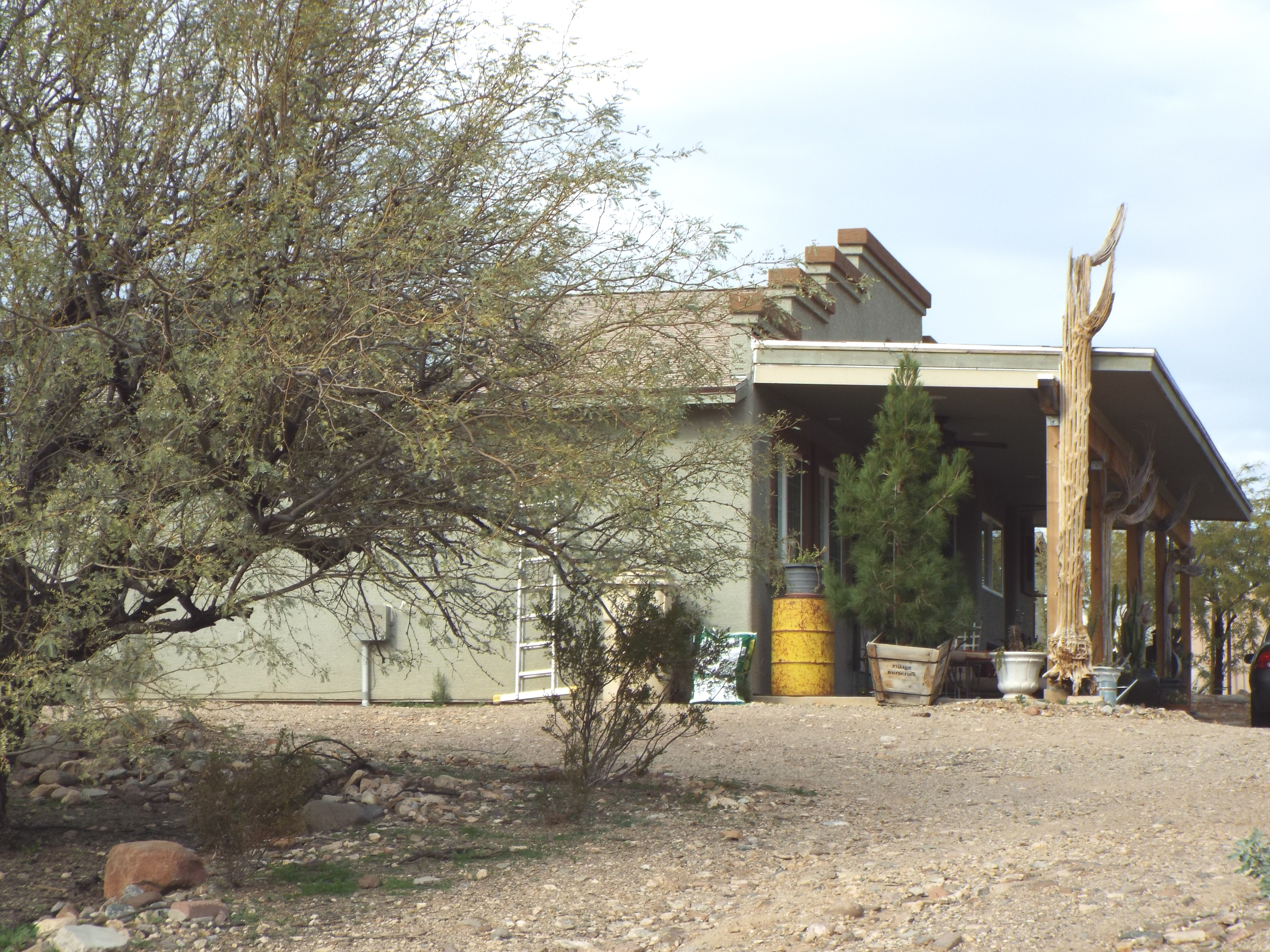
Early 1900s General Store.

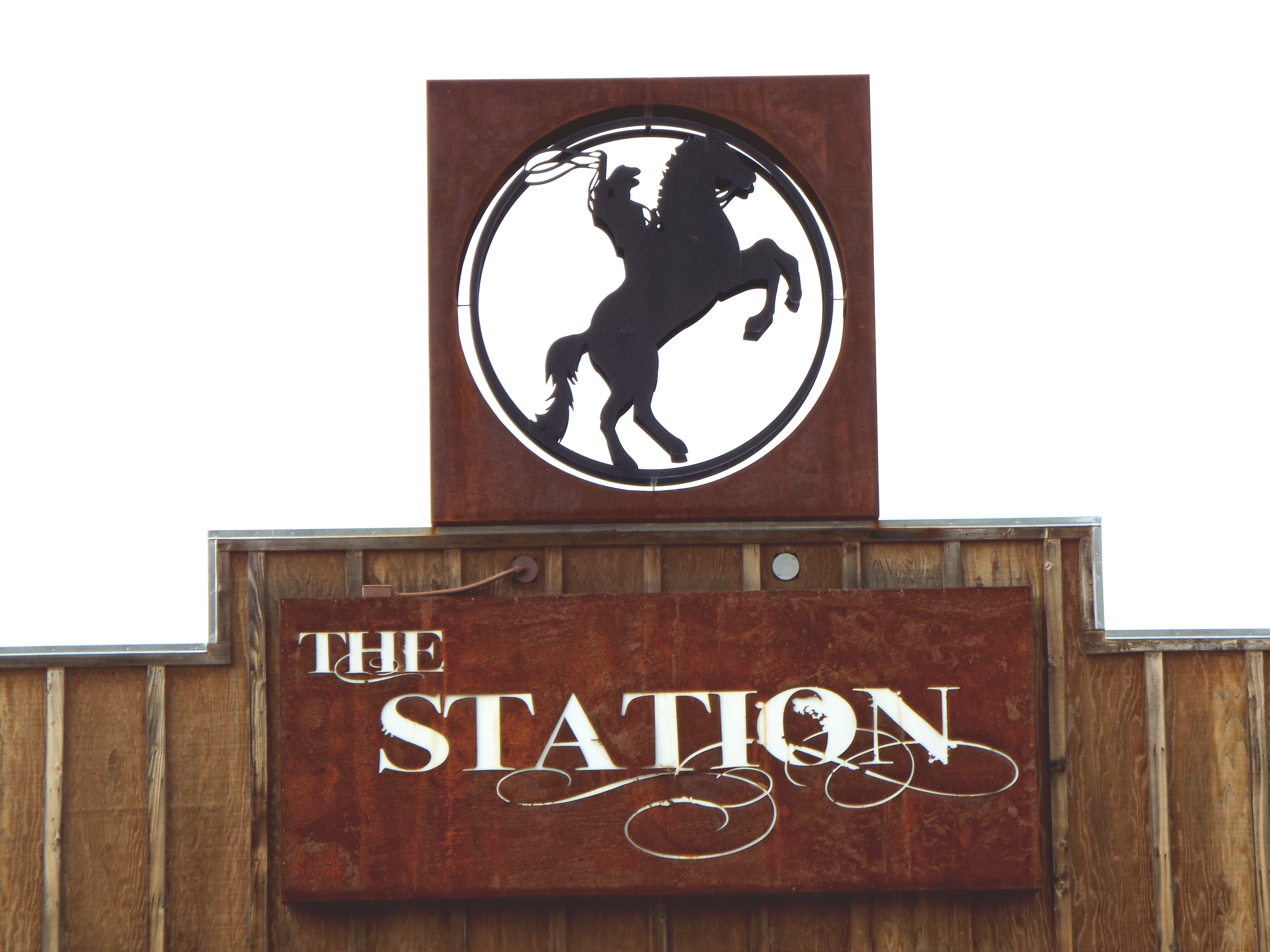
Logo of The Station Stagecoach Stop.

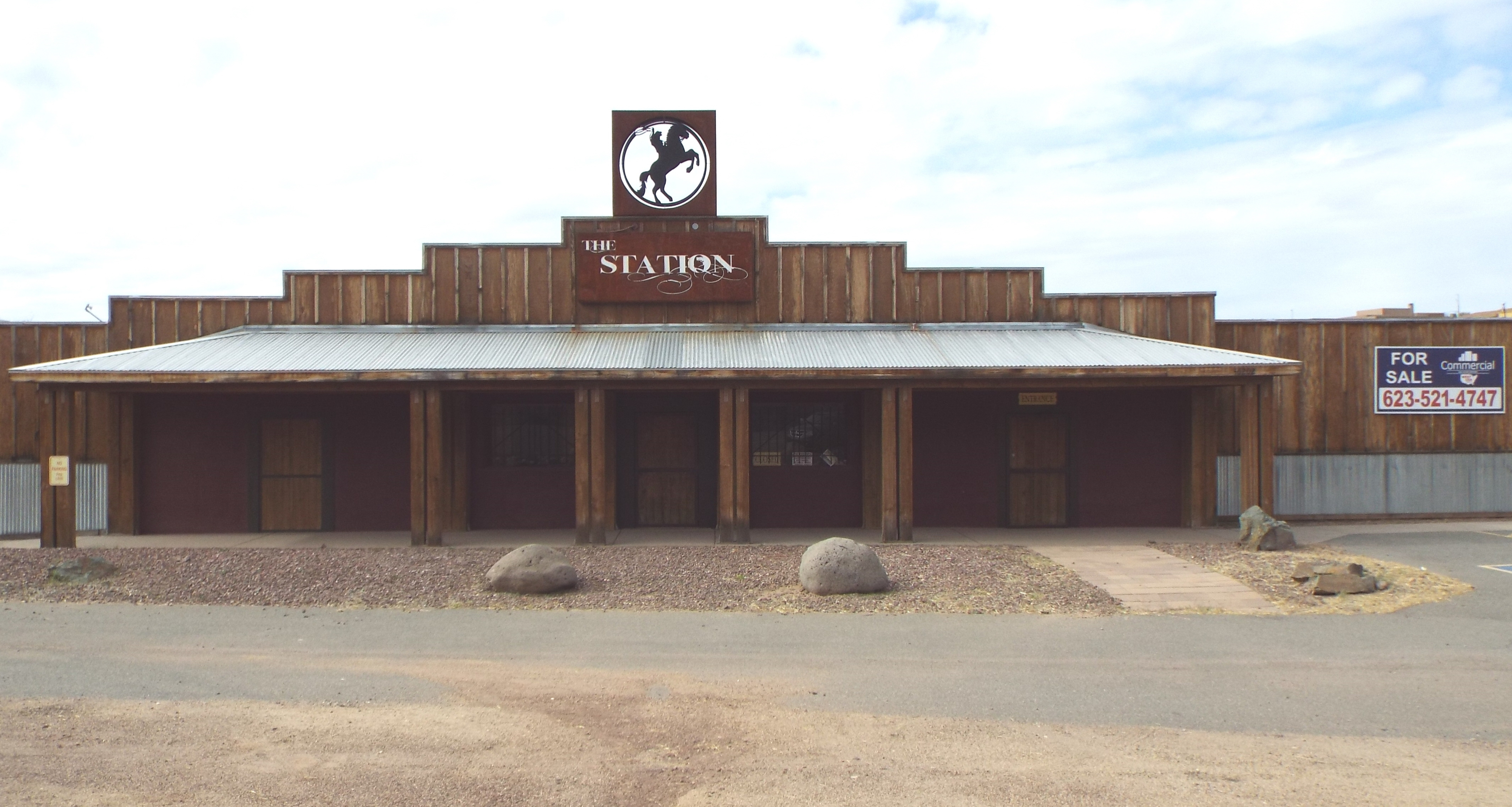
The Station Stagecoach Stop.

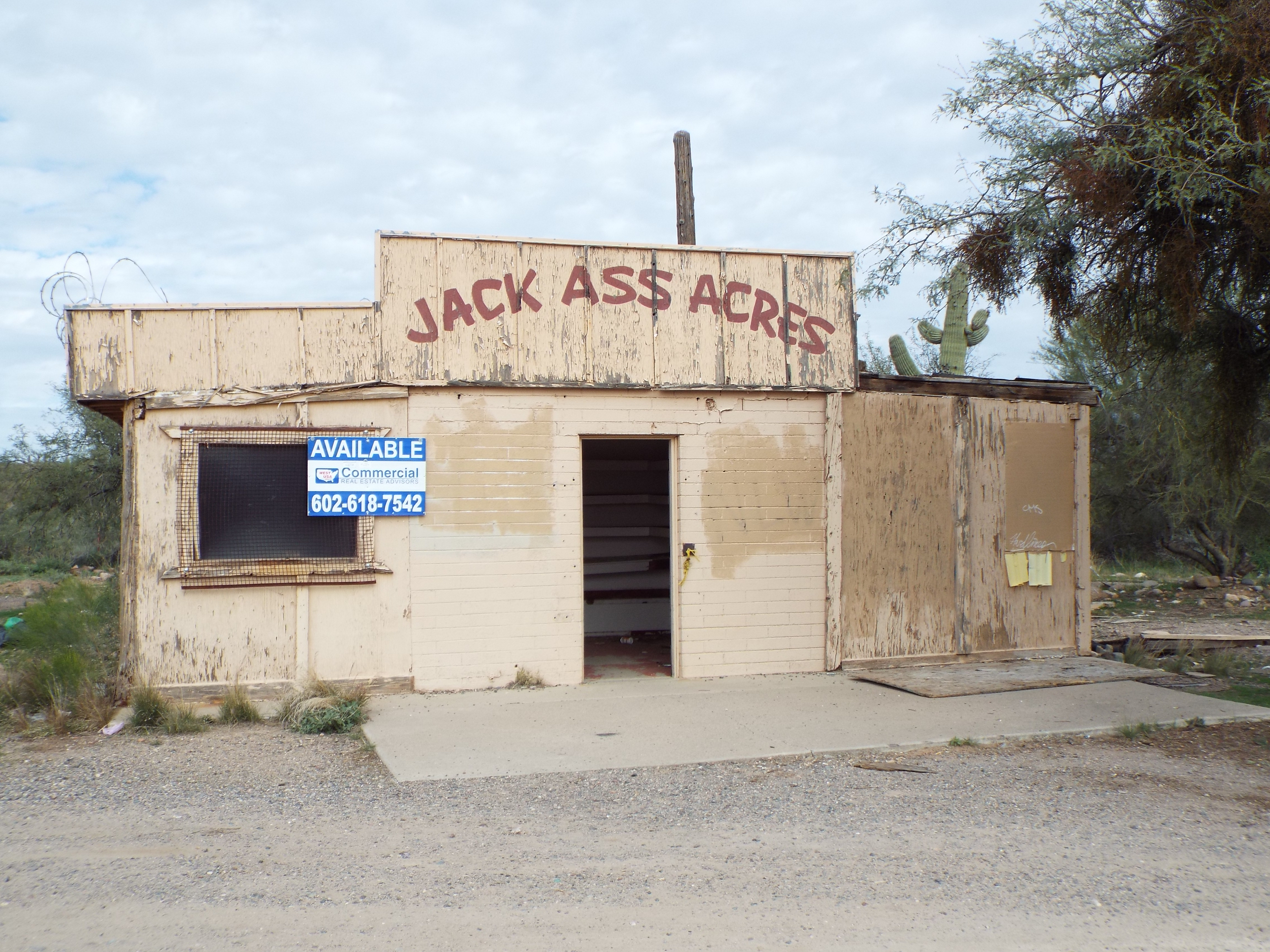
The Jack Ass Acres Service Station

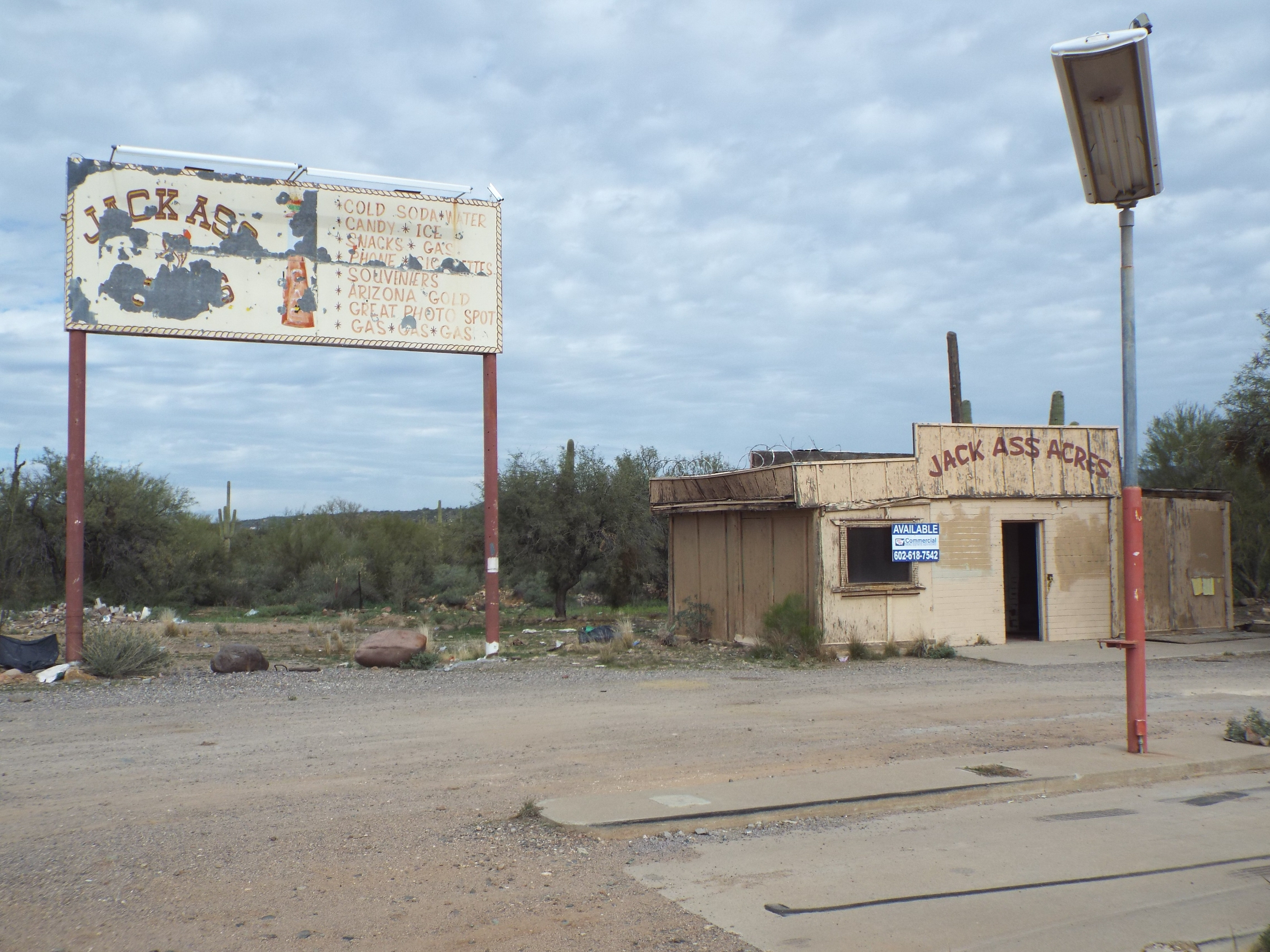
Full view of the Jack Ass Acres Service Station.

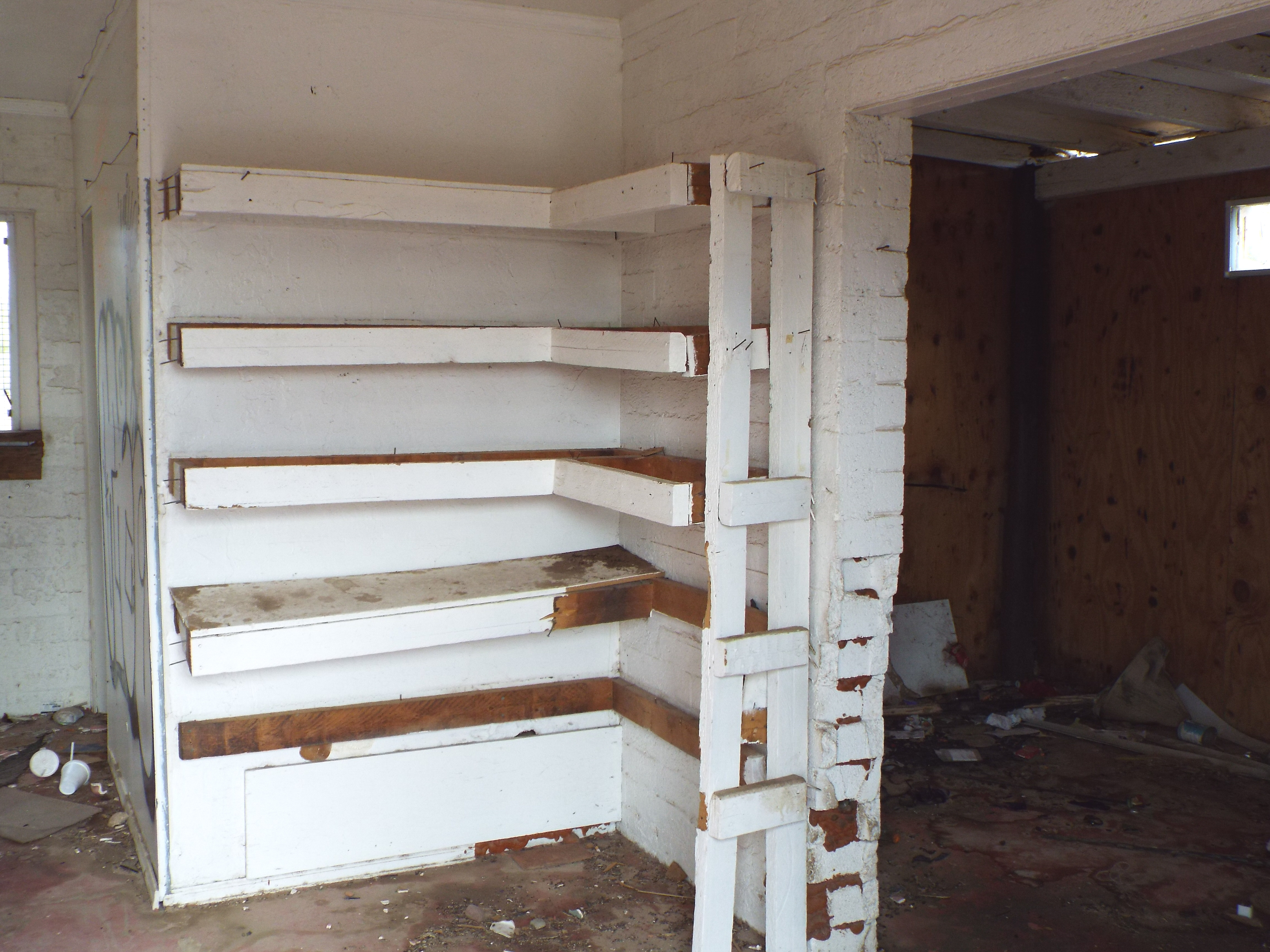
Inside the Jack Ass Acres Service Station.

== See also ==
- New River
- National Register of Historic Places listings in Maricopa County, Arizona
