= New River Mountains =

Landform in central Arizona, United States

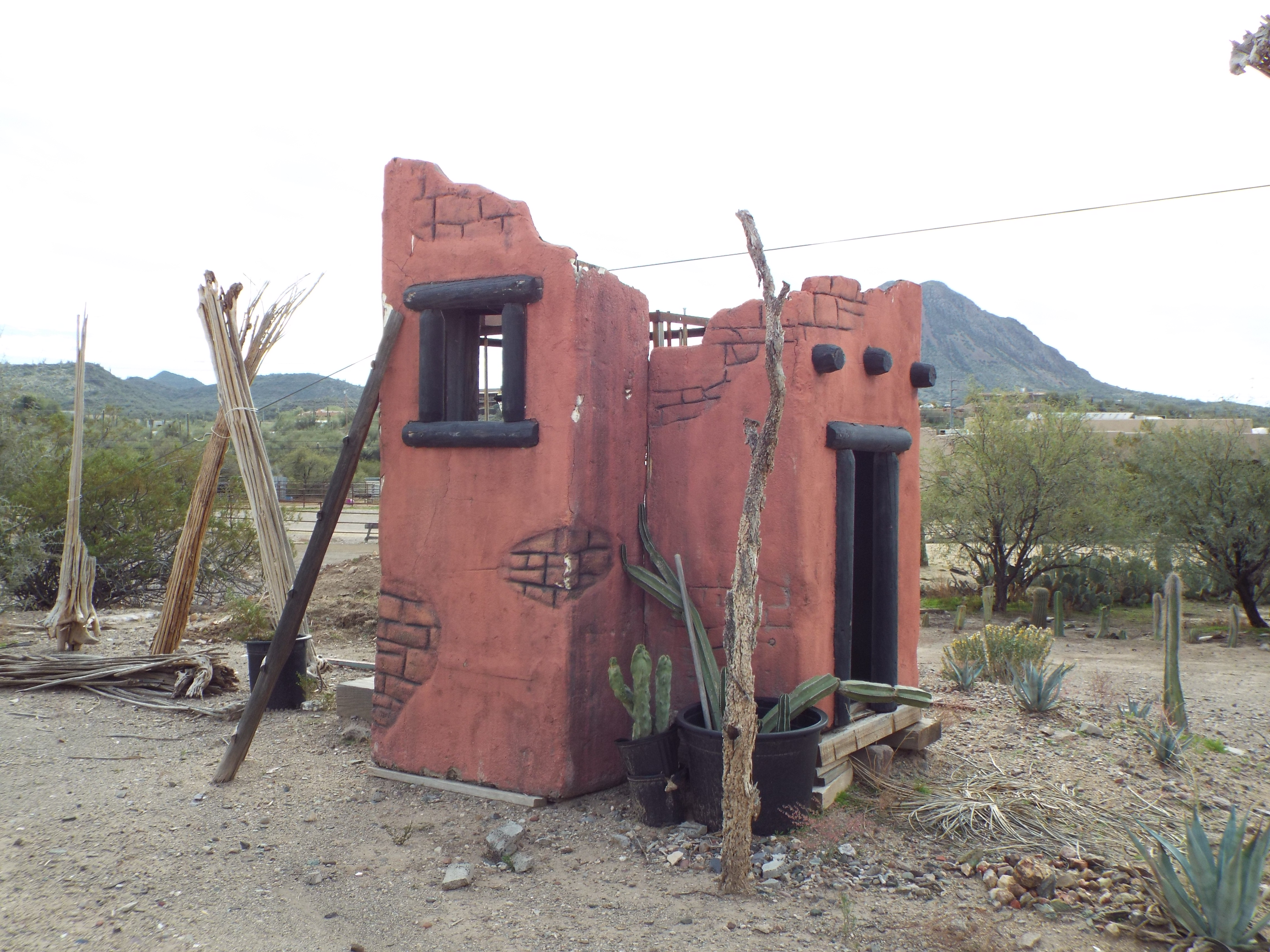

Highest point
- Peak: Squaw Mountain, New River Mountains
- Elevation: 5,905 ft (1,800 m)
- Coordinates: 34°03′21″N 111°59′16″W

Dimensions
- Length: 14 mi (23 km) SW-NE
- Width: 7 mi (11 km)

Geography
- Location within Arizona
- Country: United States
- State: Arizona
- Regions: Sonoran Desert, Mogollon Rim and Mogollon Plateau
- Counties: Yavapai and Maricopa
- Settlements: New River and Black Canyon City
- Borders on: Bradshaw Mountains, Agua Fria River, Perry Mesa, Black Hills, Phoenix, Verde River and Mazatzal Mountains

The New River Mountains are a small 14-mi (23 km) long mountain range in central Arizona, on the north border of the Phoenix valley; the range is located on the southwest perimeter of the Arizona transition zone. The range is a sub-part of landforms extending south from the Black Hills of Yavapai County. Rivers and canyons border east and west; the south of the range is located in Maricopa County, the location of much of the Phoenix metropolitan area.

== Description ==
The New River Mountains are part of a region extending southwards from the southeast of the Black Hills of central Arizona. The region contains mesas, hills, and mountain peaks; the region is bordered on the west by the Black Canyon, where the Agua Fria River flows south towards Phoenix, and on the east, canyons where the Verde River also flows south to enter the Phoenix valley.

The small sub-range is about 14 mi (23 km) long. Hills are attached south and southeastwards of the New River Mesa on the mountain range's south, and meet the cities at the north of Phoenix, Cave Creek and Carefree. The north of the New River Mountains are attached to two mesas: Squaw Creek Mesa which extends west towards the Black Canyon, and Cooks Mesa which extends east towards West Cedar Mountain. West and East Cedar Mountain lie on the southwest of Tangle Creek, whose outfall lies on the Verde River, and borders the west of the extensive north-south Mazatzal Wilderness.

The center of the range is located near Benchmark Mountain, 5,855 feet (1,785 m), and the highpoint of the range is at the range's north, Squaw Mountain, 5,905 feet (1,800 m), located at the east perimeter of Squaw Creek Mesa.

== Access ==
The New River Mountains are easily accessed from Interstate 17 which borders the range on the west. The cities on I-17, directly west and southwest of the range are Black Canyon City, Rock Springs, New River, and Desert Hills.
