= Gavilan Peak (Arizona) =

Landform in Maricopa County, Arizona

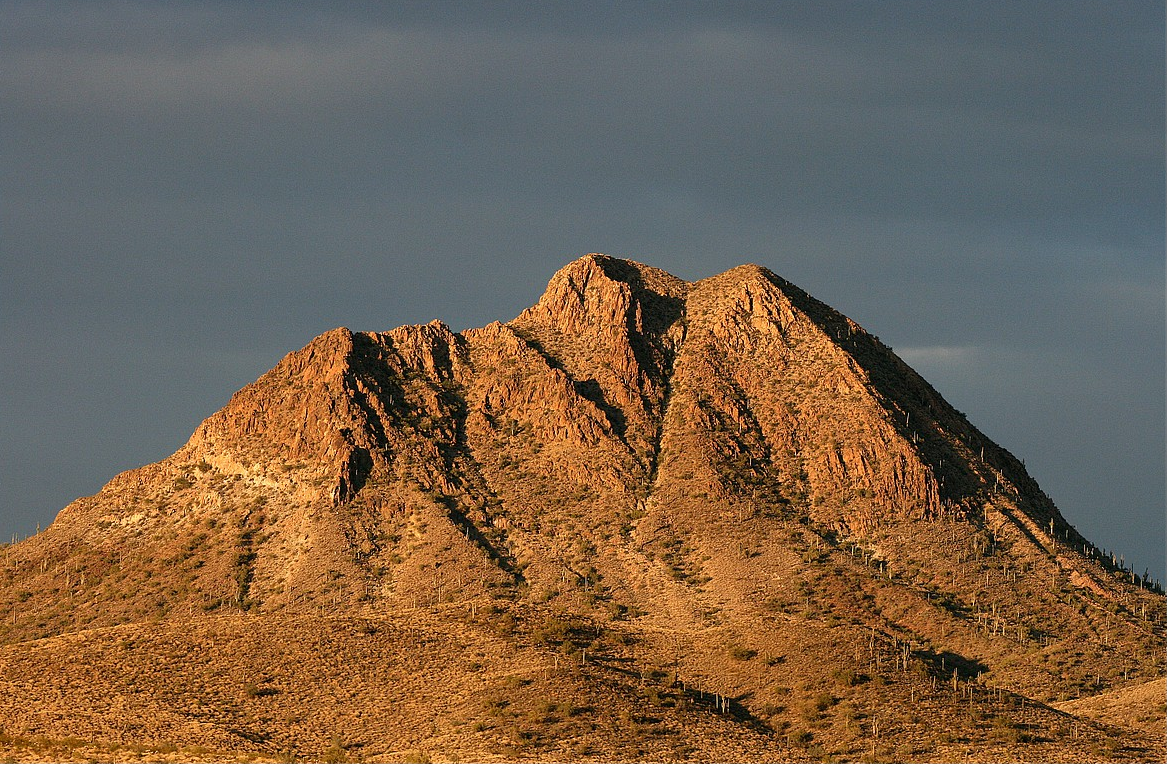

Highest point
- Elevation: 2,990 ft (911 m) NGVD 29
- Prominence: 730 ft (223 m)
- Coordinates: 33°54′25″N 112°07′27″W

Geography
- Location within Arizona
- Location: Maricopa County, Arizona, U.S.
- Topo map: USGS Daisy Mountain

Gavilan Peak is northwest of Daisy Mountain, north of Anthem, Arizona and southeast of New River, Arizona. Considering its steepness, it is climbed much less frequently than Daisy Mountain. It was named in the 1880s, when the U.S. Cavalry and the Apaches fought a battle in the area. The name means 'sparrow hawk' in Spanish and 'hawk' in Apache.
