= Daisy Mountain Preserve =

Protected area in Maricopa County, Arizona

Coordinates: 33.889°N 112.114°W

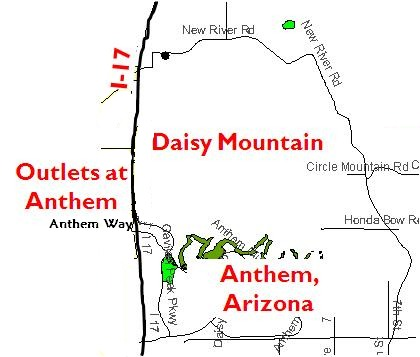
General location of Daisy Mountain

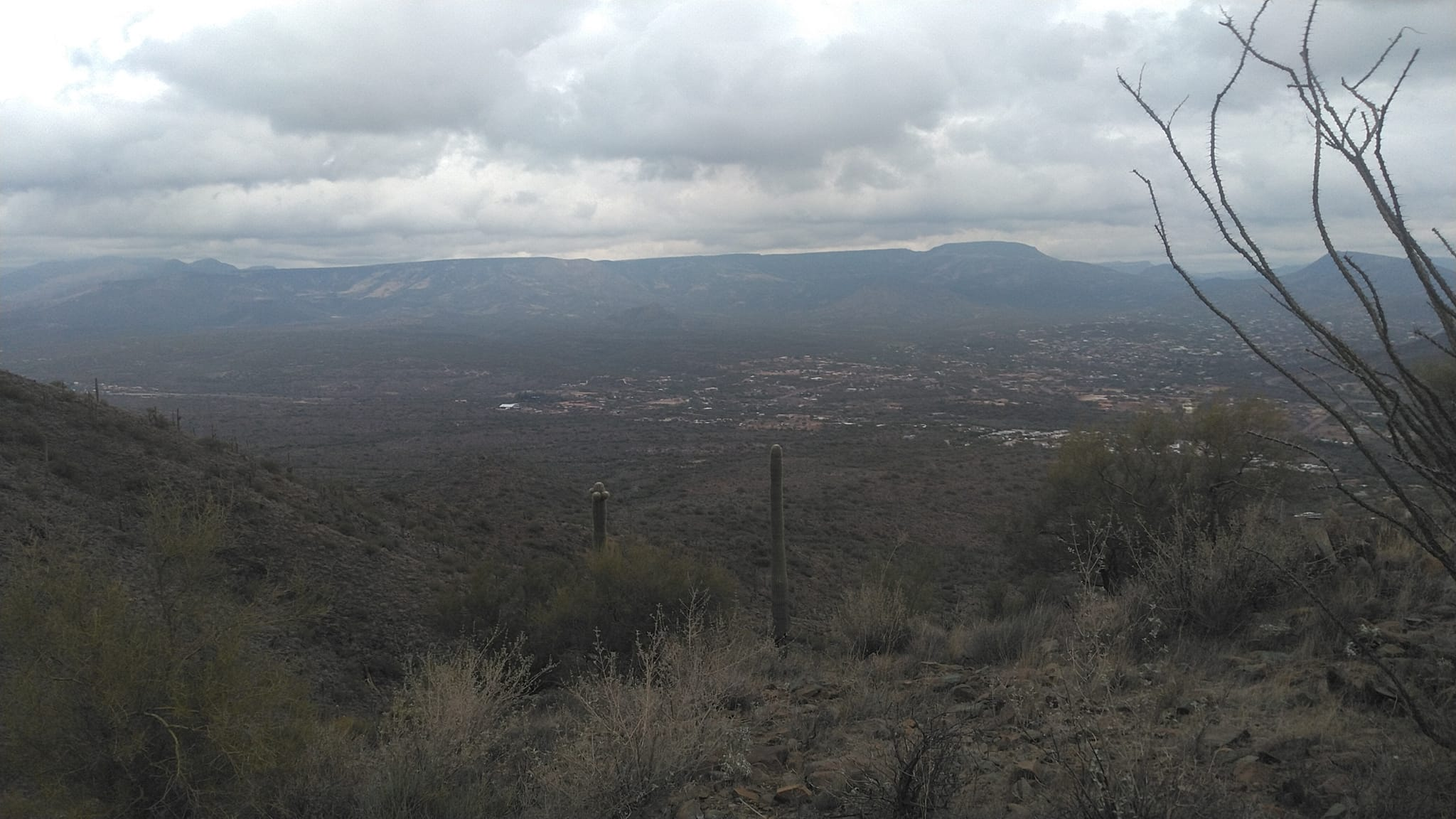
View towards northeast from Daisy Mountain Preserve

The Daisy Mountain Potential Preserve is a six-square-mile (16 km^{2}) undeveloped Arizona State Trust Land area straddling the communities of Anthem, Desert Hills, New River, and a northern area of Phoenix. It is open to the public with a State Land Department Recreation permit. Residents of the surrounding area enjoy hiking, horse back riding, photography, bicycling, birding, and other recreational activities within the potential preserve. Motorized vehicles are restricted by Arizona State Trust Land and Maricopa County dust regulations There is no water due to limited rainfall over the desert landscape, though intermittent or seasonal washes do exist. Obtaining preserve designation for the Daisy Mountain Arizona State Trust Land is the major focus of the North Country Conservancy.

== Hiking ==
There are no designated trails although the Maricopa County Regional Trail's Anthem Trailhead is near-by and a number of informal trails providing paths exist and can be used by mountain bikers, hikers and horse-riders. Plant life consists mostly of cacti and dry shrubbery. A portion of the potential preserve seems to be limited to residents of the Anthem Country Club only, though there is a county easement from the Maricopa County Regional Trail through the Country Club to the Daisy Mountain Arizona State Trust land. Visitors are encouraged to use their judgement as to avoid intrusion onto Country Club property. The New River Nature Preserve provides other hiking opportunities.

Maricopa County has requested a new hiking trail across Daisy Mountain with partial maintenance to be performed by Friends of Daisy Mountain Trails (a 501 c 3 corporation).
