= Bryan Phillip Darrell Duppa =

American pioneer (1832–1892)

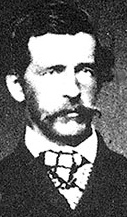
- "Lord" Darrell Duppa
- Born: October 9, 1832; Paris, France
- Died: January 30, 1892 (aged 59); Phoenix, Arizona, United States

Bryan Phillip Darrell Duppa (October 9, 1832 – January 30, 1892) was a pioneer in the settlement of Arizona prior to its statehood.

== Life ==
Duppa, who called himself Lord Darrell Duppa, was the son of Baldwin Francis Duppa and Catherine née Darrell. The Duppa family home was Hollingbourne House near Maidstone, Kent. He was born in Paris, France, in 1832 where his father was a British Diplomat. He attended Cambridge University and learned the classics and five languages.

In the early 1860s he was working in New Zealand on the farm of his uncle George Duppa before leaving in early 1863 heading to California via Australia.

He stated that he had been shipwrecked and wandered through South America for some time before he reached North America and Prescott, Arizona, in 1863. He told John G. Bourke that he had been born at Marseille and that his family served in the diplomatic service.

Having made friends with Jack Swilling and realizing the value of land, drilling, and canal building, he moved to the future site of Phoenix, Arizona, with Swilling in 1867. Duppa built one of the oldest homes in Phoenix in 1870. He later died in Phoenix in 1892, at the age of 59. He is buried at the small Pioneer and Military Memorial Park a few blocks from the state Capitol.

== Legacy ==
Duppa is recognized as one of the founders of Phoenix, Arizona, with his friend Swilling, and eventually built a ranch north of Phoenix. Phoenix was founded in 1868 and incorporated in 1881, and the name proposed by Duppa came from the story of the mythical Phoenix's rebirth from the ashes, the basis being the rebirth of a city of canals that was rebuilt on the site of the ancient Hohokam canal systems that dated back to about 700–1400 AD.

He is credited for naming nearby Tempe after the Vale of Tempe in Greece.

Duppa founded New River, north of Phoenix, as a stagecoach stop.

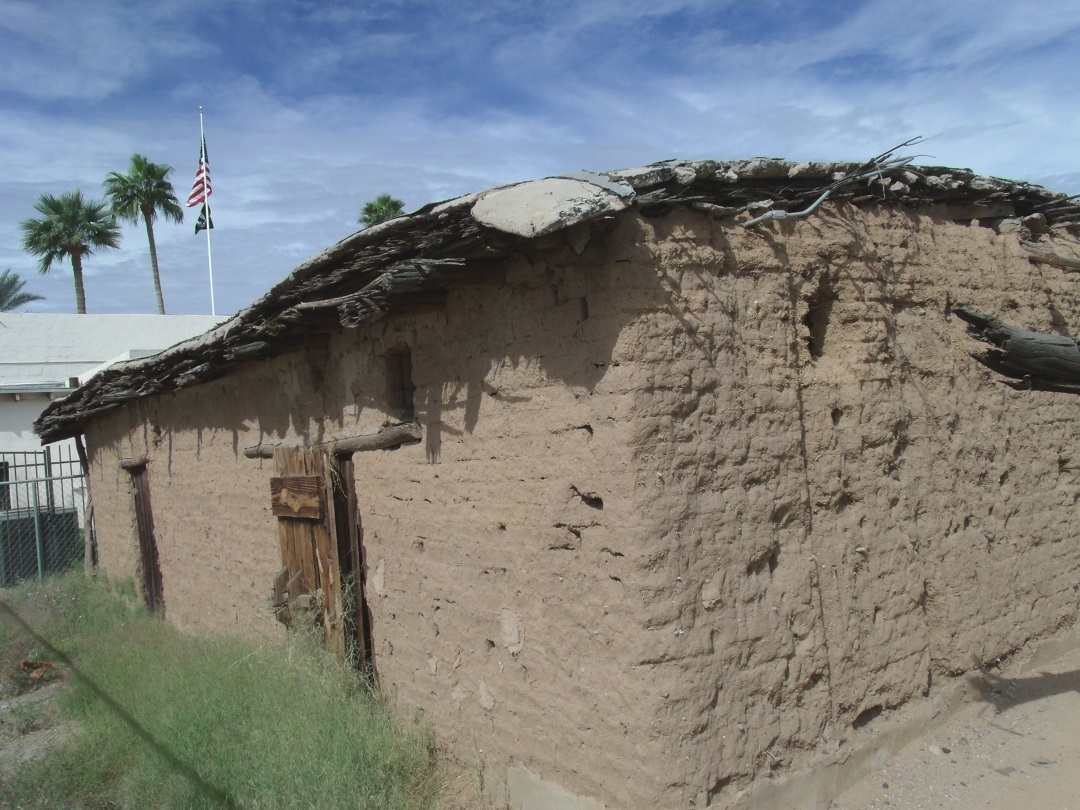
The 1870 adobe homestead house of Phillip Darrell Duppa in Phoenix.

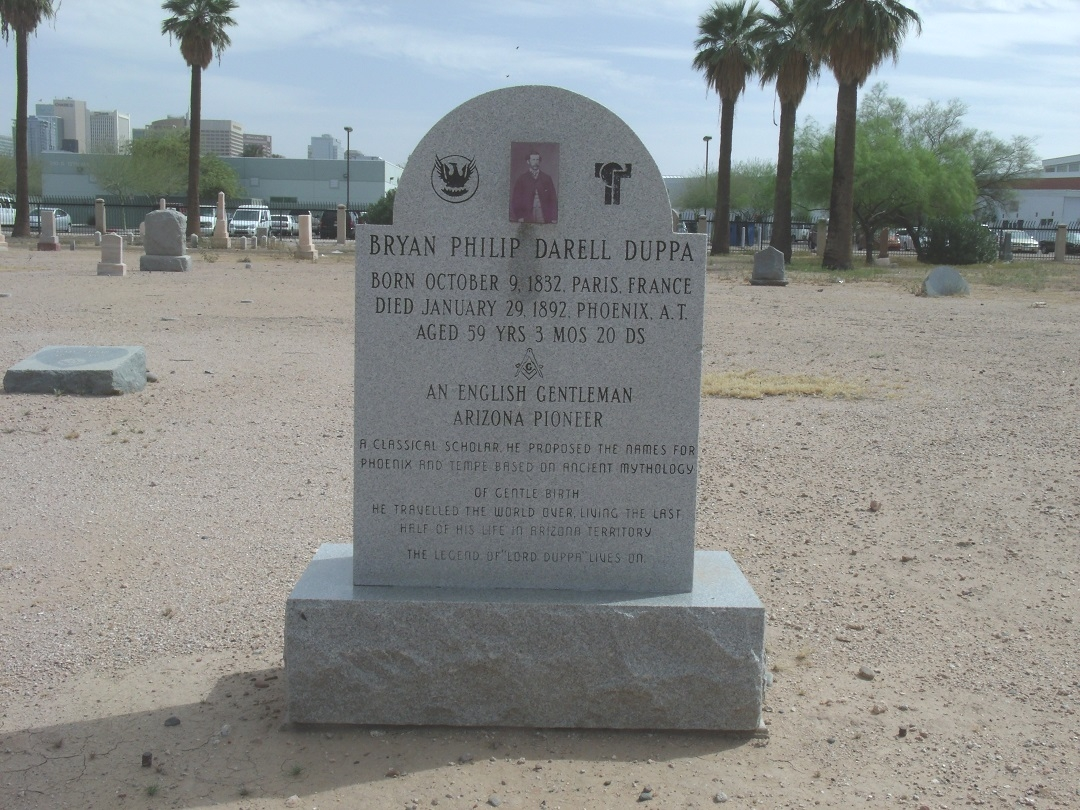
Grave site of Phillip "Lord" Darrell Duppa.

== See also ==
- History of Phoenix, Arizona
- Pioneer and Military Memorial Park
