= Desert Hills, Maricopa County, Arizona =

Populated Place in Maricopa County, Arizona

Desert Hills, Arizona
- Populated place
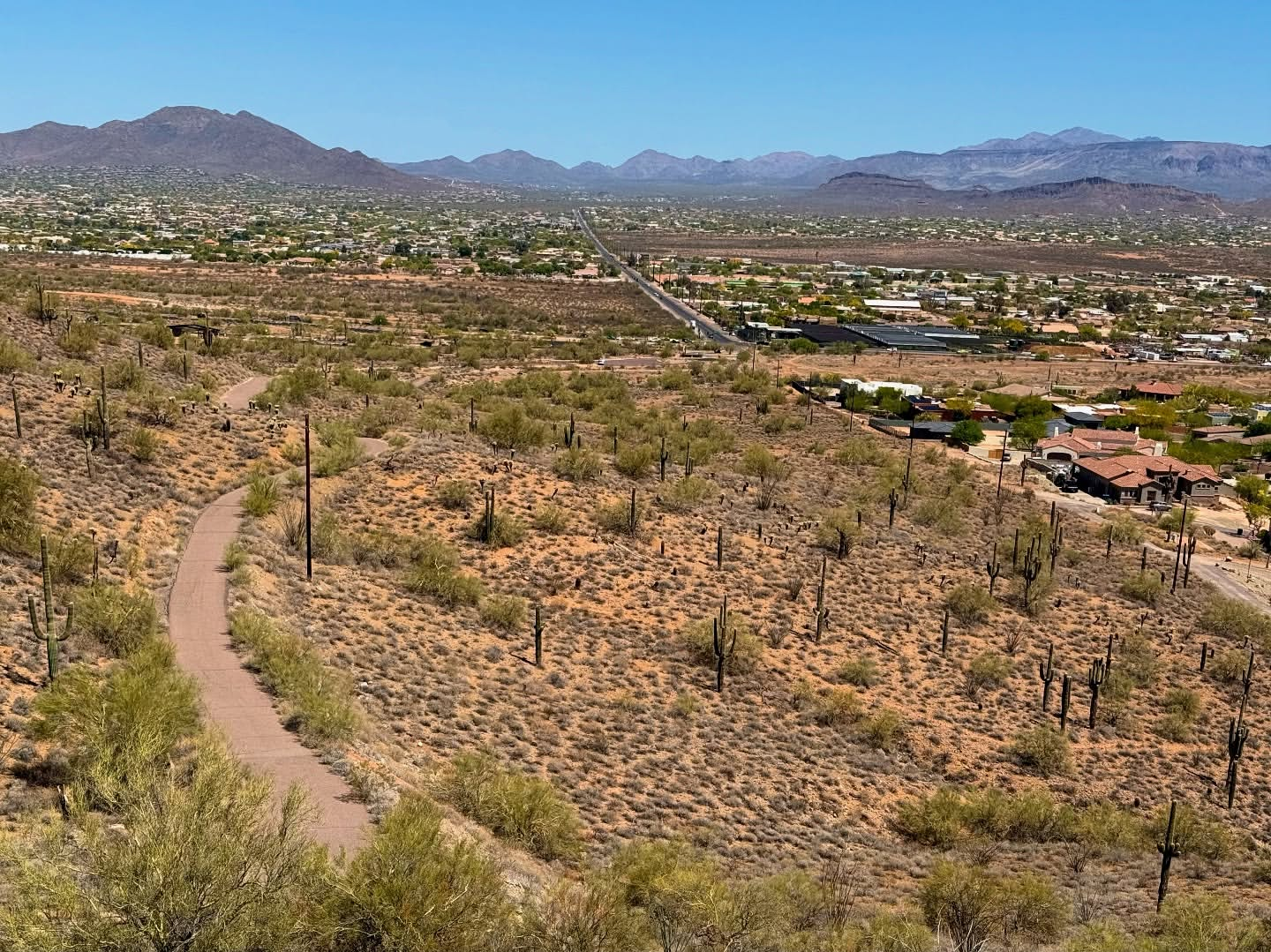
- Desert Hills as seen from Roland Peak (2025)

- Location within Maricopa County, Arizona Location within Arizona Location within the United States
- Coordinates: 33°50′35″N 112°05′17″W
- Country: United States
- State: Arizona
- County: Maricopa
- Elevation: 1,696 ft (517 m)

Population (2019)
  - Total: ≈ 3,000
- Time zone: UTC-7 (MST)
- ZIP codes: 85086
- Area code: 623

Desert Hills is an unincorporated community located in Maricopa County, in the U.S. state of Arizona which forms the southern portion of the New River census-designated place. The population of the community was estimated to be slightly below 3,000 residents as of 2019.

== History ==
Desert Hills is named after the foothills situated in the area, such as those found in Cave Creek Regional Park and the Phoenix Sonoran Preserve, which are directly adjacent to the community. The modern community of Desert Hills began to take shape in 1955, when a land development corporation purchased 4,280 acres of the Sam Joy Ranch approximately 16 miles north of the Phoenix city limit and subdivided it into 10 acre lots for sale.

In 2017, residents formed a committee to investigate the feasibility of making Desert Hills and the neighboring community of New River into an incorporated municipality. A campaign supporting such an incorporation aimed to collect the signatures of ten percent of the community's registered voters needed to force a ballot measure in November 2019. The Arizona State Land Department expressed opposition to the incorporation effort in April 2019, noting that nearly half of the land which would make up the proposed municipality was state trust land and expressing a concern that the proposed municipality would not be able to independently provide necessary municipal services. In June 2019, it was reported that the campaign had failed to win the necessary approval of the City of Phoenix to permit a vote on the issue of incorporation.

In 2024, the Arizona State Land Department's plan to auction 6,400 acres of state trust land in Desert Hills became a topic of debate during Town Council elections in neighboring Cave Creek, with some candidates expressing concerns that new development in the area would increase strain on the Desert Hills aquifer. A referendum to purchase and append the area into a protected municipal park in Cave Creek was proposed to safeguard the aquifer.

== Geography ==
The Desert Hills area is generally bounded by Desert Hills Drive to the north, 35th Avenue to the west, Dove Valley Road to the south, and 28th Street to the east. The community is bordered by the City of Phoenix to the south, the Town of Cave Creek to the east, and the community of Anthem to the north. The area is predominantly rural in nature with large lot single family residential homes nestled between surrounding mountains and buttes.

== Government ==
Desert Hills is served by Deer Valley Unified School District.

Fire and emergency service is provided through the Daisy Mountain Fire District.

Many residents previously relied on water delivered by state-licensed water haulers from fire hydrants located in Phoenix. As of August 2018, water is hauled from a filling station operated by Epcor.
