= Wranglers Roost Stagecoach Stop =

- Ghost town
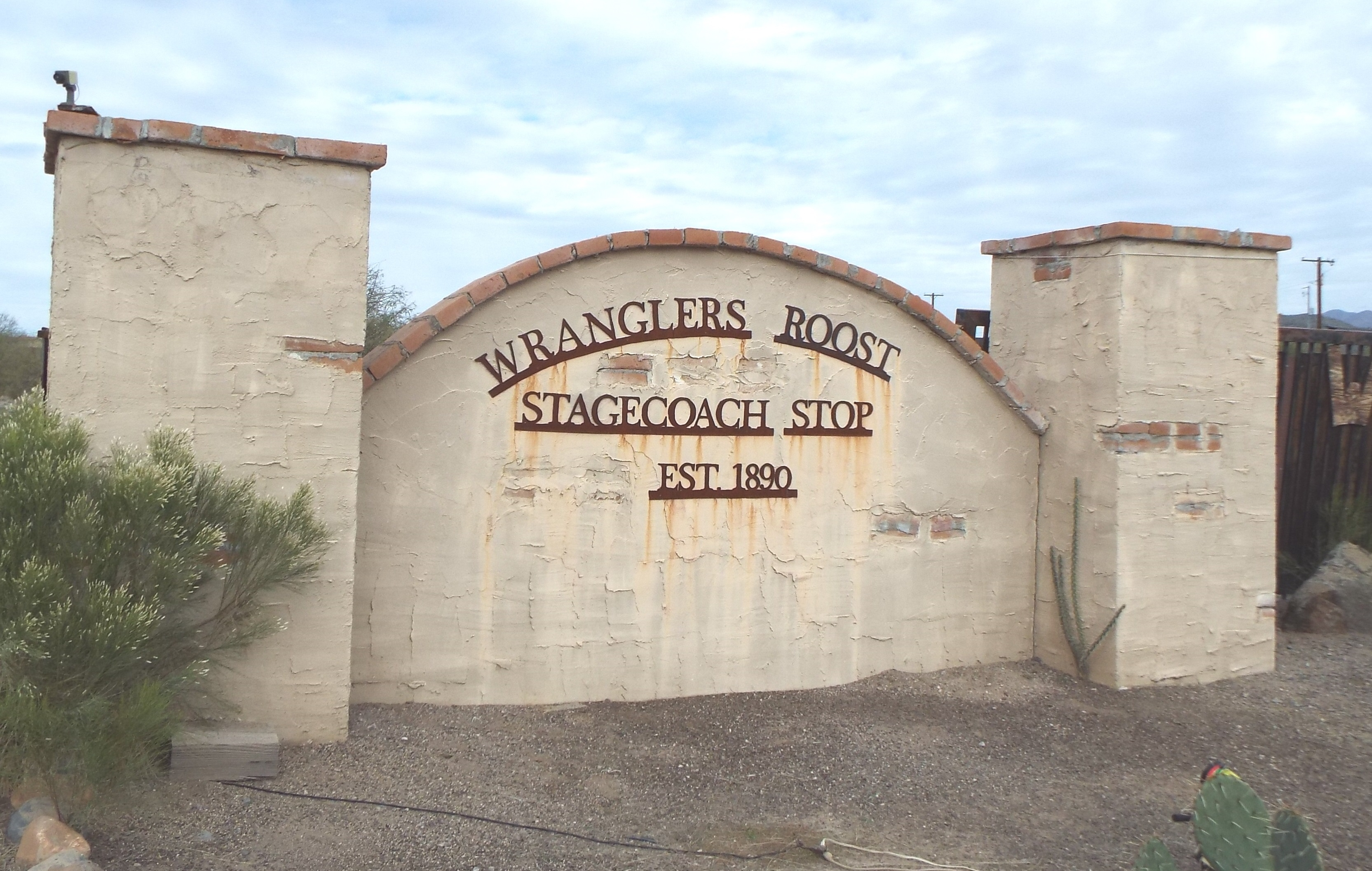
- The front gate the historic Wranglers Roost Stagecoach Stop

- Location in the state of Arizona Wranglers Roost Stagecoach Stop (the United States)
- Coordinates: 33°55′27″N 112°6′48″W
- Country: United States
- State: Arizona
- County: Maricopa
- Elevation: 2,083 ft (635 m)

Population (2010)
  - Total: 0
- Time zone: UTC-7 (MST (no DST))
- GNIS ID: 36403

Wranglers Roost Stagecoach Stop is located in New River, Maricopa County, Arizona. It was a stagecoach stop for a short time in the late 1800s. In 1930, Carl Jesse Myers (called himself Chief Myers) built WR in the 1930s as a dude ranch. The dude ranch was successful all through the 1930s when times were tough. The original rock structure was added onto in the late 1960s and became a resort with a pool, hot tub, restaurant and some hotel accommodations. The current owners, Reid and Heidi Stewart, also rent the structure for the celebrations of weddings.

== Gallery ==
Images of the Wranglers Roost Stagecoach Stop
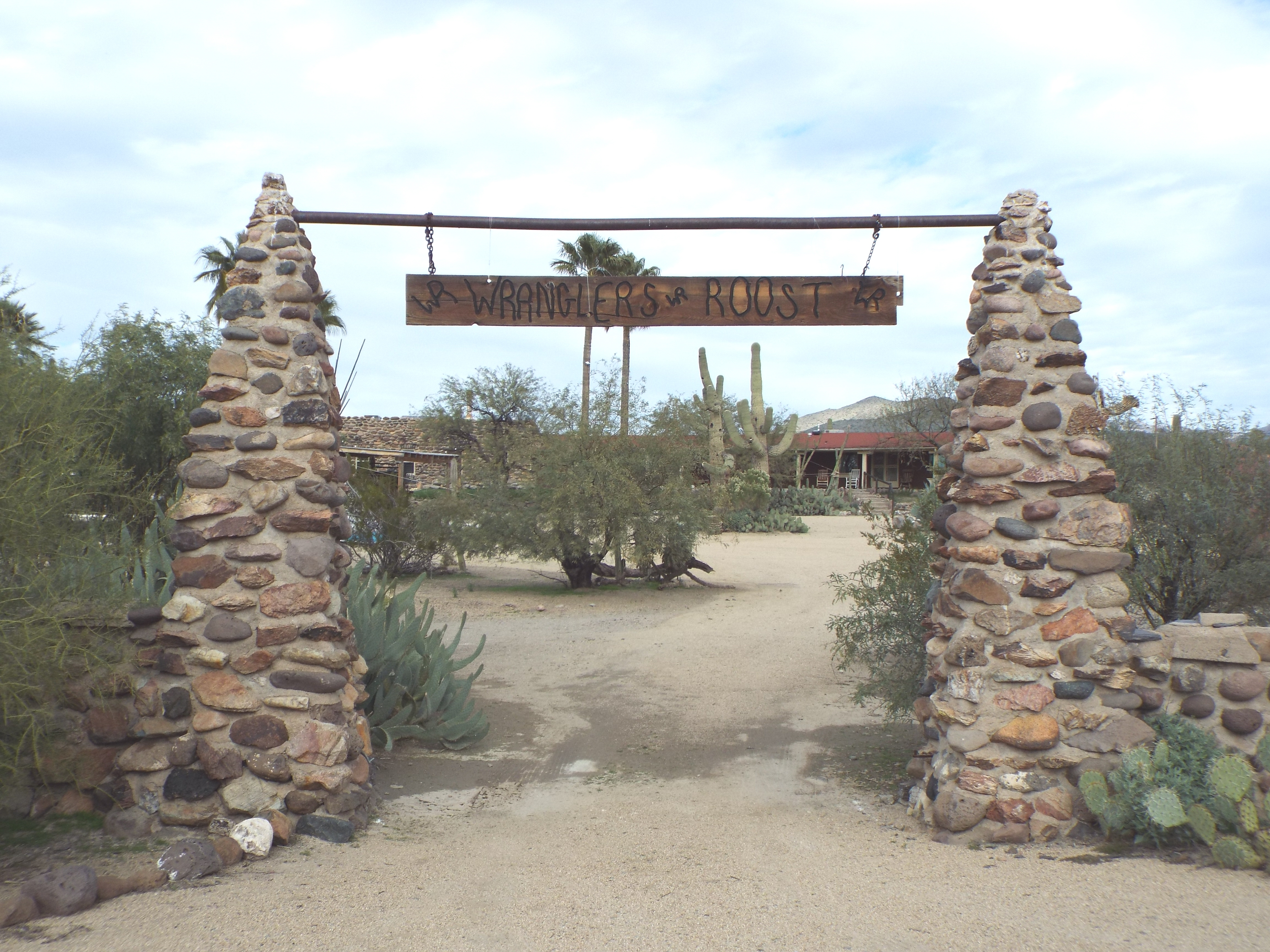
The entrance of the historic Wranglers Roost Stagecoach Stop located in 2500 West New River Road in New River, Arizona. This was where the New River stagecoach stop was located in the late 1800s. The current owners, Reid and Heidi Stewart, use the location, which was rebuilt in 1930, for weddings and as a resort.

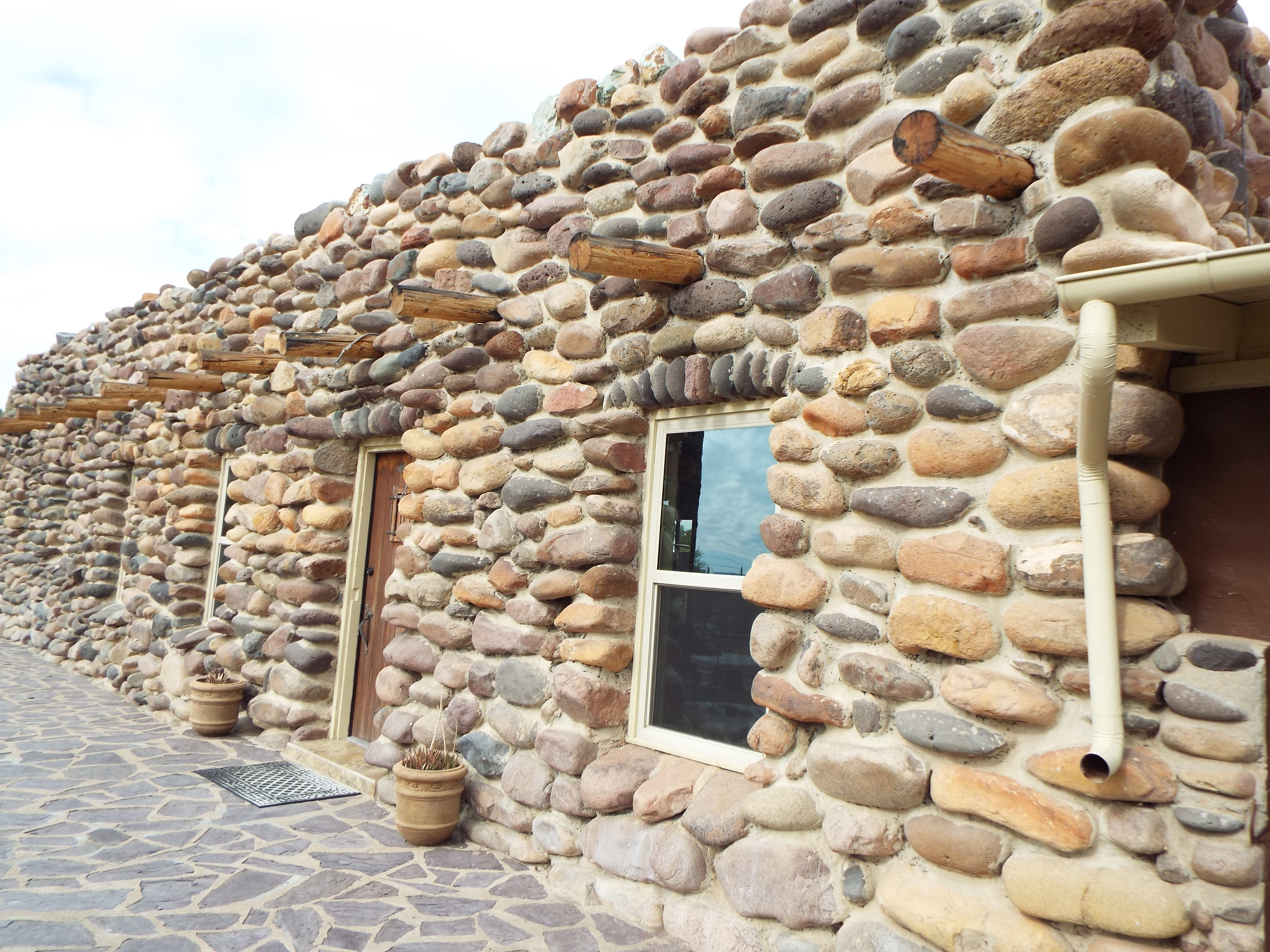
The main building of the historic Wranglers Roost Stagecoach Stop

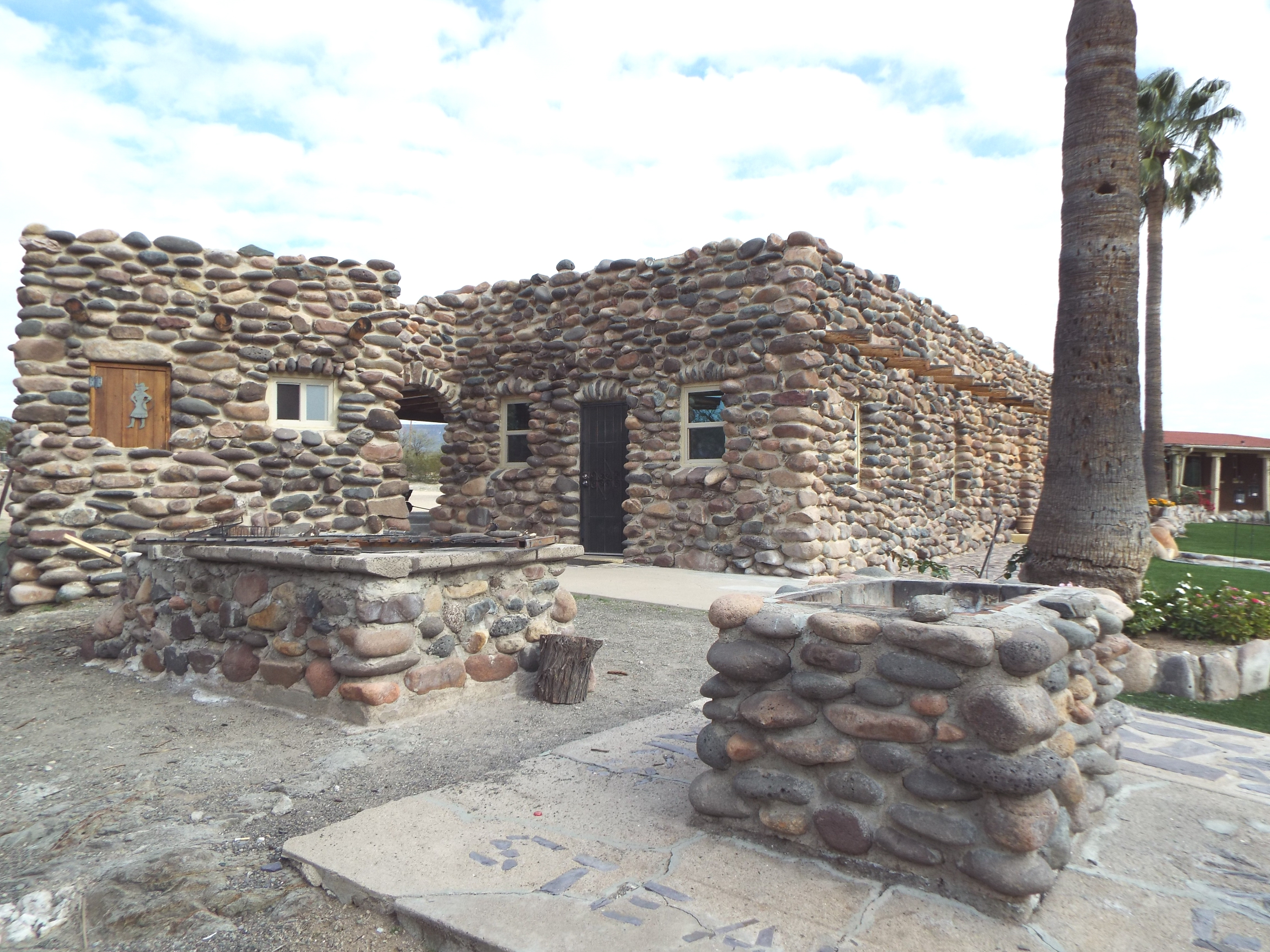
A different view of the main building of the historic Wranglers Roost Stagecoach Stop.

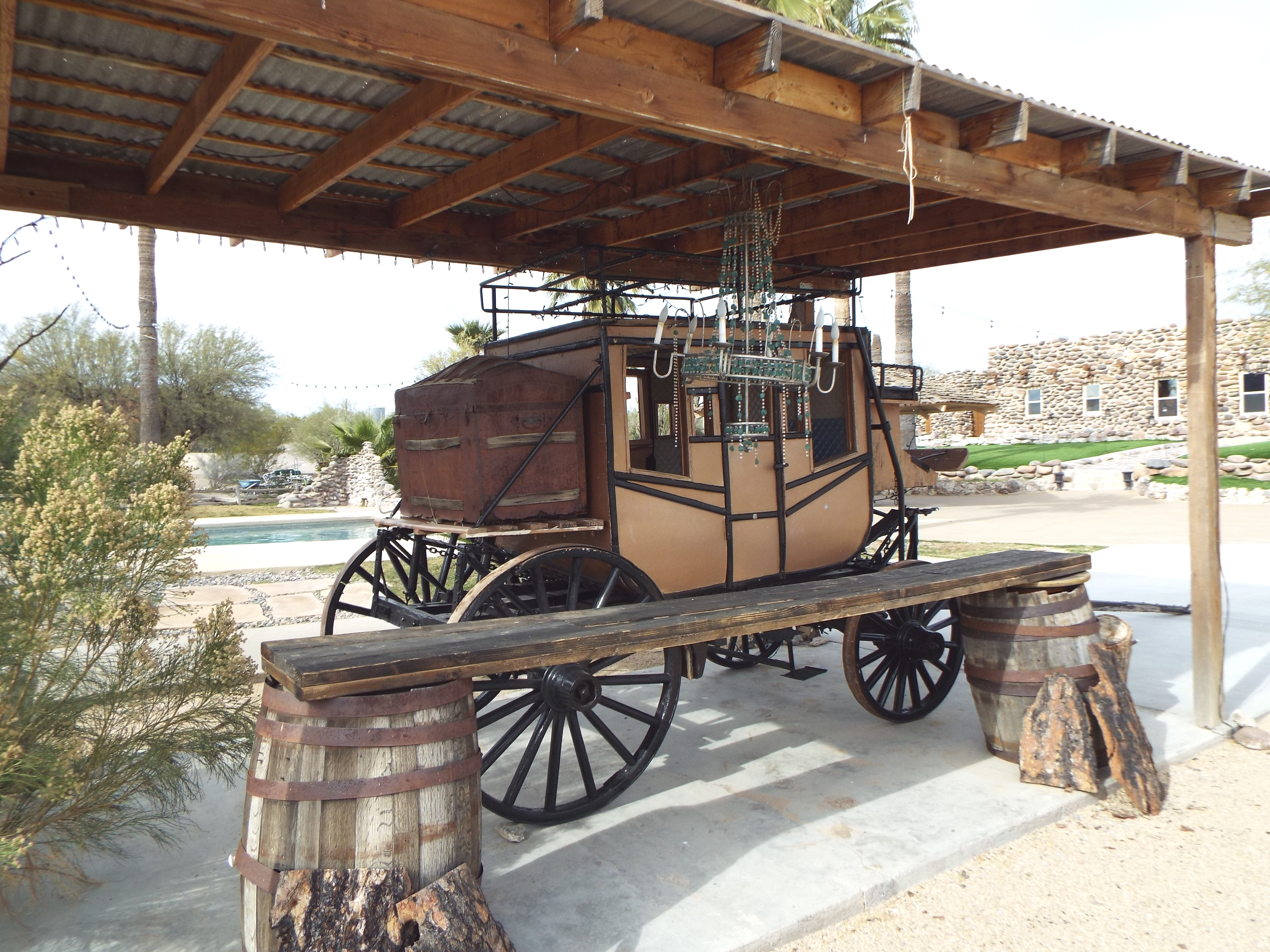
Stagecoach located in the grounds of the historic Wranglers Roost Stagecoach Stop.

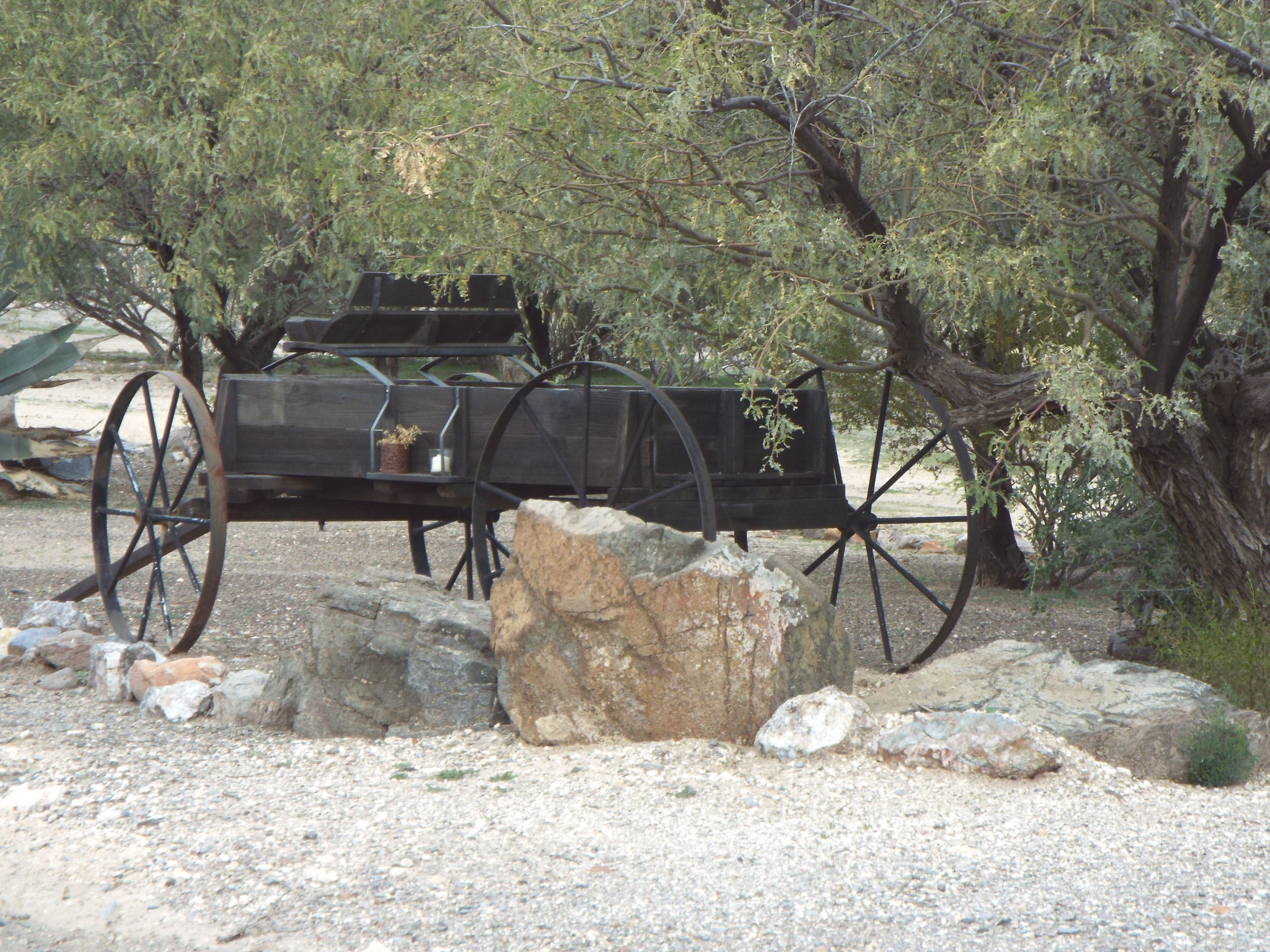
Wagon located in the grounds of the Wranglers Roost Stagecoach Stop.

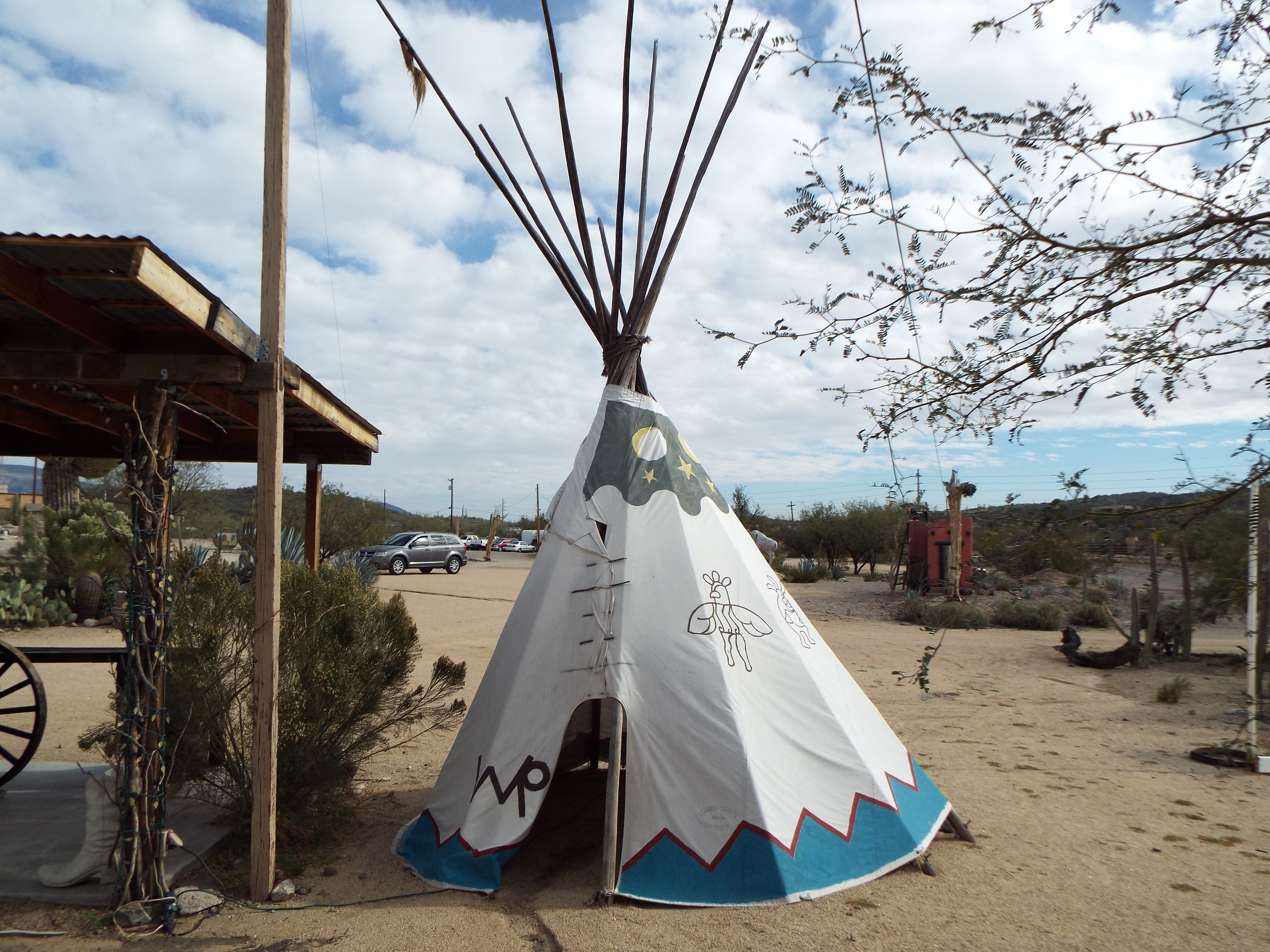
Replica a of a Native American Tee Pee located in the grounds of the Wranglers Roost Stagecoach Stop.

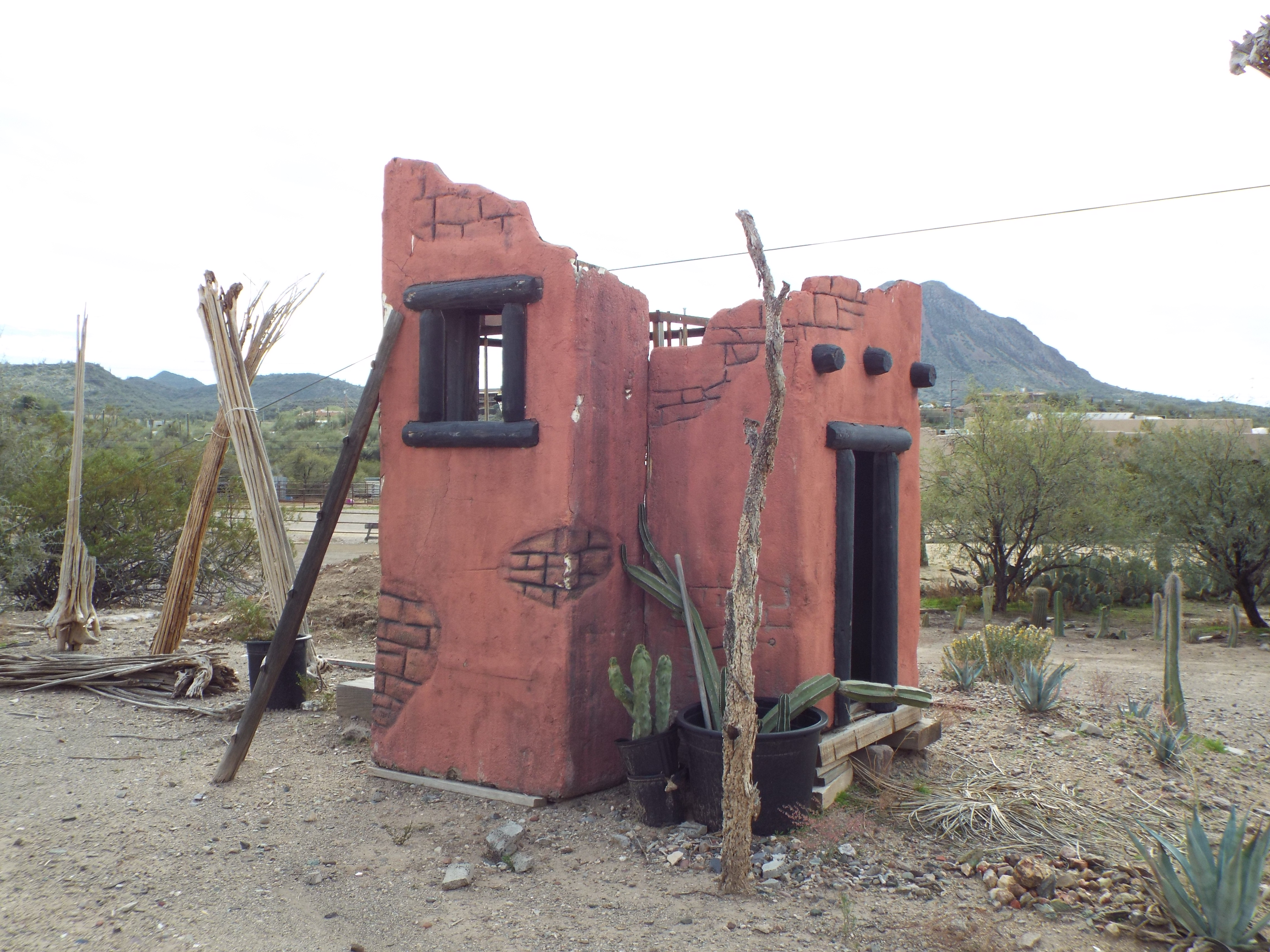
Replica of the ruins of a late 1800s structure located in the grounds of the Wranglers Roost Stagecoach Stop.
