= New River, Arizona =

CDP in Maricopa County, Arizona

- Census-designated place
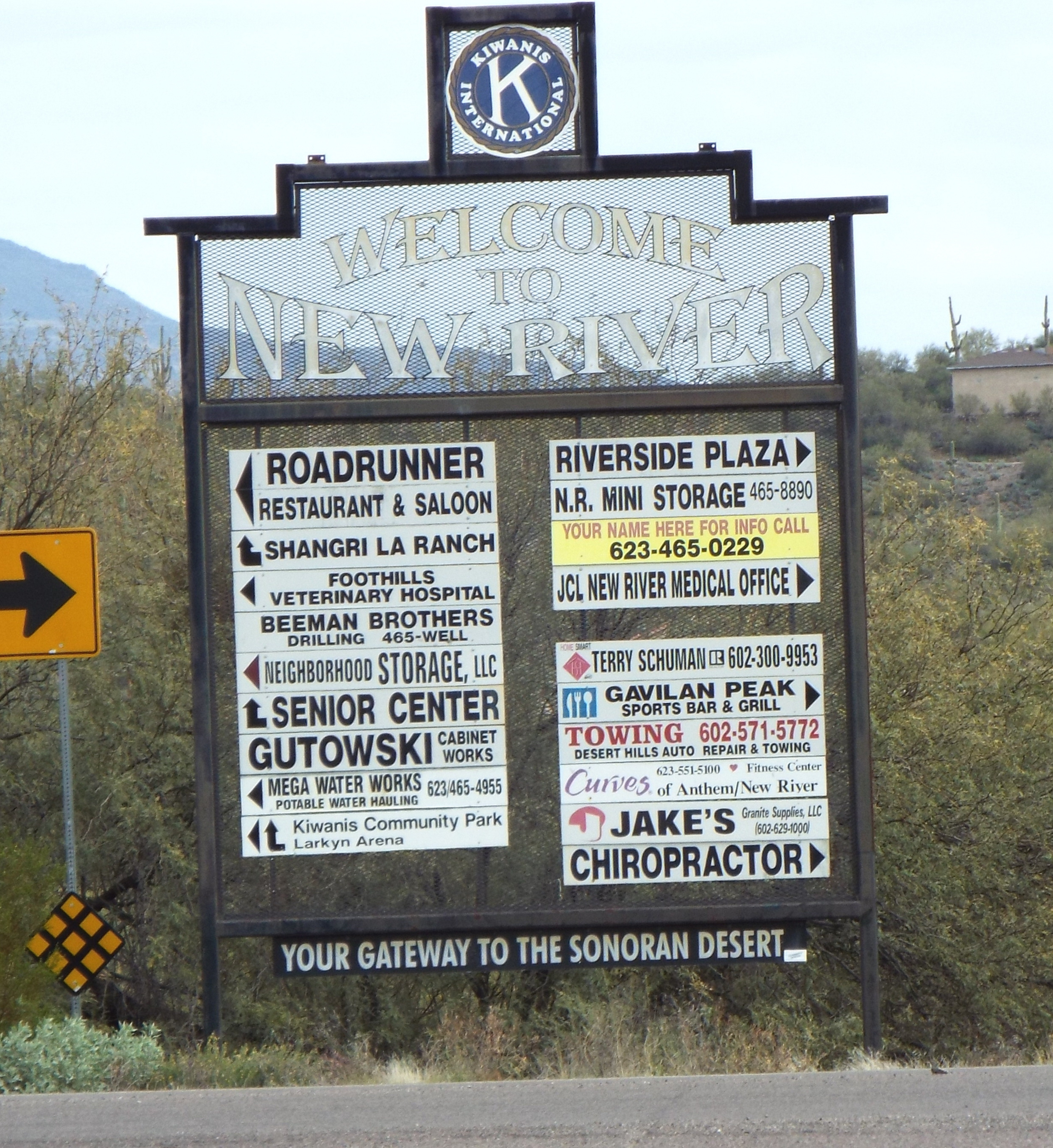
- Welcome sign

- Location in Maricopa County and the state of Arizona

- Location within Arizona Location within the United States
- Coordinates: 33°52′09″N 112°05′09″W
- Country: United States
- State: Arizona
- County: Maricopa

Area
  - Total: 56.12 sq mi (145.35 km^{2})
  - Land: 56.11 sq mi (145.32 km^{2})
  - Water: 0.012 sq mi (0.03 km^{2})
- Elevation: 2,136 ft (651 m)

Population (2020)
  - Total: 17,290
  - Density: 308.2/sq mi (118.98/km^{2})
- Time zone: UTC-7 (MST)
- ZIP codes: 85087 (New River); 85086 (Phoenix)
- Area code: 623
- FIPS code: 04-49360
- GNIS feature ID: 2408920

New River is an unincorporated community and census-designated place (CDP) in Maricopa County, Arizona, United States. The population was 17,290 as of the 2020 census, up from 14,952 at the 2010 census.

== History ==
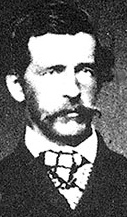
Phillip "Lord" Darrell Duppa

New River is named after the seasonal wash of the same name, part of the Agua Fria River system which drains into the Salt River. The community was founded by Lord Darrell Duppa in 1868 as a stagecoach stop. For many years it was the terminus of the old Black Canyon Highway (now Interstate 17). The pavement ended in New River and continued as a dirt road to the city of Prescott.

== Geography ==
New River is located in northern Maricopa County and is bordered by the Tonto National Forest to the north, Cave Creek to the east, Phoenix to the south, and Phoenix and Anthem to the west. The CDP includes the area known as Desert Hills. New River is approximately 36 miles (58 km) north of downtown Phoenix.

According to the United States Census Bureau, the CDP has a total area of 56.1 square miles (145 km^{2}), of which 0.01 square miles (0.03 km^{2}), or 0.02%, are water. 3,176-foot (968 m) Daisy Mountain and 2,980-foot (910 m) Gavilan Peak are within the community.

== Demographics ==
Historical population
Census	Pop.	Note	%±
2000	10,740		—
2010	14,952		39.2%
2020	17,290		15.6%
U.S. Decennial Census

=== 2020 census ===
As of the 2020 census, New River had a population of 17,290. The median age was 49.5 years. 19.3% of residents were under the age of 18 and 20.6% of residents were 65 years of age or older. For every 100 females there were 101.3 males, and for every 100 females age 18 and over there were 101.3 males age 18 and over.

60.5% of residents lived in urban areas, while 39.5% lived in rural areas.

There were 6,401 households in New River, of which 26.2% had children under the age of 18 living in them. Of all households, 65.4% were married-couple households, 13.4% were households with a male householder and no spouse or partner present, and 14.7% were households with a female householder and no spouse or partner present. About 16.1% of all households were made up of individuals and 7.7% had someone living alone who was 65 years of age or older.

There were 6,942 housing units, of which 7.8% were vacant. The homeowner vacancy rate was 1.7% and the rental vacancy rate was 4.9%.

Racial composition as of the 2020 census
Race	Number	Percent
White	15,150	87.6%
Black or African American	131	0.8%
American Indian and Alaska Native	121	0.7%
Asian	180	1.0%
Native Hawaiian and Other Pacific Islander	17	0.1%
Some other race	459	2.7%
Two or more races	1,232	7.1%
Hispanic or Latino (of any race)	1,514	8.8%

=== 2010 census ===
As of the 2010 census, the population of the New River CDP area was 14,952. This is nearly a two thirds growth from the previous census. The total housing units nearly doubled from 3,921 in 2000 to 6,753 in 2010.

New River CDP area is within Maricopa County District 3. According to 2010 census numbers, the New River CDP consists of about 2% of Maricopa County District 3 and only 0.3% of Maricopa County.

=== 2000 census ===
As of the 2000 census, there were 10,740 people, 3,921 households, and 3,066 families residing in the CDP. The population density was 151.6 inhabitants per square mile (58.5/km^{2}). There were 4,514 housing units at an average density of 63.7 per square mile (24.6/km^{2}). The racial makeup of the CDP was 95.9% White, 0.4% Black or African American, 0.6% Native American, 0.5% Asian, 0.1% Pacific Islander, 1.3% from other races, and 1.4% from two or more races. 4.9% of the population were Hispanic or Latino of any race.

There were 3,921 households, out of which 35.3% had children under the age of 18 living with them, 68.9% were married couples living together, 5.6% had a female householder with no husband present, and 21.8% were non-families. 15.3% of all households were made up of individuals, and 2.9% had someone living alone who was 65 years of age or older. The average household size was 2.73 and the average family size was 3.04.

In the CDP, the population was spread out, with 26.0% under the age of 18, 4.8% from 18 to 24, 33.2% from 25 to 44, 28.5% from 45 to 64, and 7.5% who were 65 years of age or older. The median age was 38 years. For every 100 females, there were 103.9 males. For every 100 females age 18 and over, there were 102.4 males.

The median income for a household in the CDP was $62,307, and the median income for a family was $68,604. Males had a median income of $46,361 versus $31,610 for females. The per capita income for the CDP was $25,932. About 3.6% of families and 5.7% of the population were below the poverty line, including 5.5% of those under age 18 and 3.1% of those age 65 or over.

== Government ==
New River is served by Deer Valley Unified School District.

Fire and emergency service is provided through the Daisy Mountain Fire District.

Many residents previously relied on water delivered by state-licensed water haulers from fire hydrants located in Phoenix. As of August 2018, water is hauled from a filling station operated by Epcor.

=== Incorporation efforts ===
New River, and its neighbor Desert Hills, are unincorporated areas in Maricopa County which in 2019 was named the fastest-growing county in the United States for the third year running. While parts of Maricopa have had considerable development, New River has held off. New River has attempted to "incorporate" a number of times in its history, so as to control zoning regulations and development in the area.

- In 1979 the area tried to incorporate into a town, and while the necessary signatures were collected to move forward with incorporation, the Maricopa County Superior Court Judge vacated the election, finding that New River was too rural and did not meet the statutory requirements for incorporation. At this time, Phoenix was approximately 30 miles (48 km) away.
- In 1995, the area attempted again to incorporate. However, this time the region to incorporate would have included approximately 120 square miles (310 km^{2}). While a sufficient number of signatures was collected, the City of Phoenix declined to pass a resolution to approve New River's request to incorporate. In 1999 there was another short-lived movement to incorporate, which also failed.
- In 2017, residents formed a committee to look into the feasibility of incorporating New River and its neighbor Desert Hills. In April 2019, the campaign to incorporate New River and Desert Hills was aiming to collect the signatures of ten per cent of registered voters needed to force a ballot on the issue in November 2019. In June 2019, it was reported that the campaign had failed to win the necessary approval of the City of Phoenix to have a vote on the issue, and the campaign group was reported as saying: "It is unfortunate that we are unable to continue our efforts after this latest development." The incorporation effort was opposed by the Arizona State Land Department.

== Local attractions ==
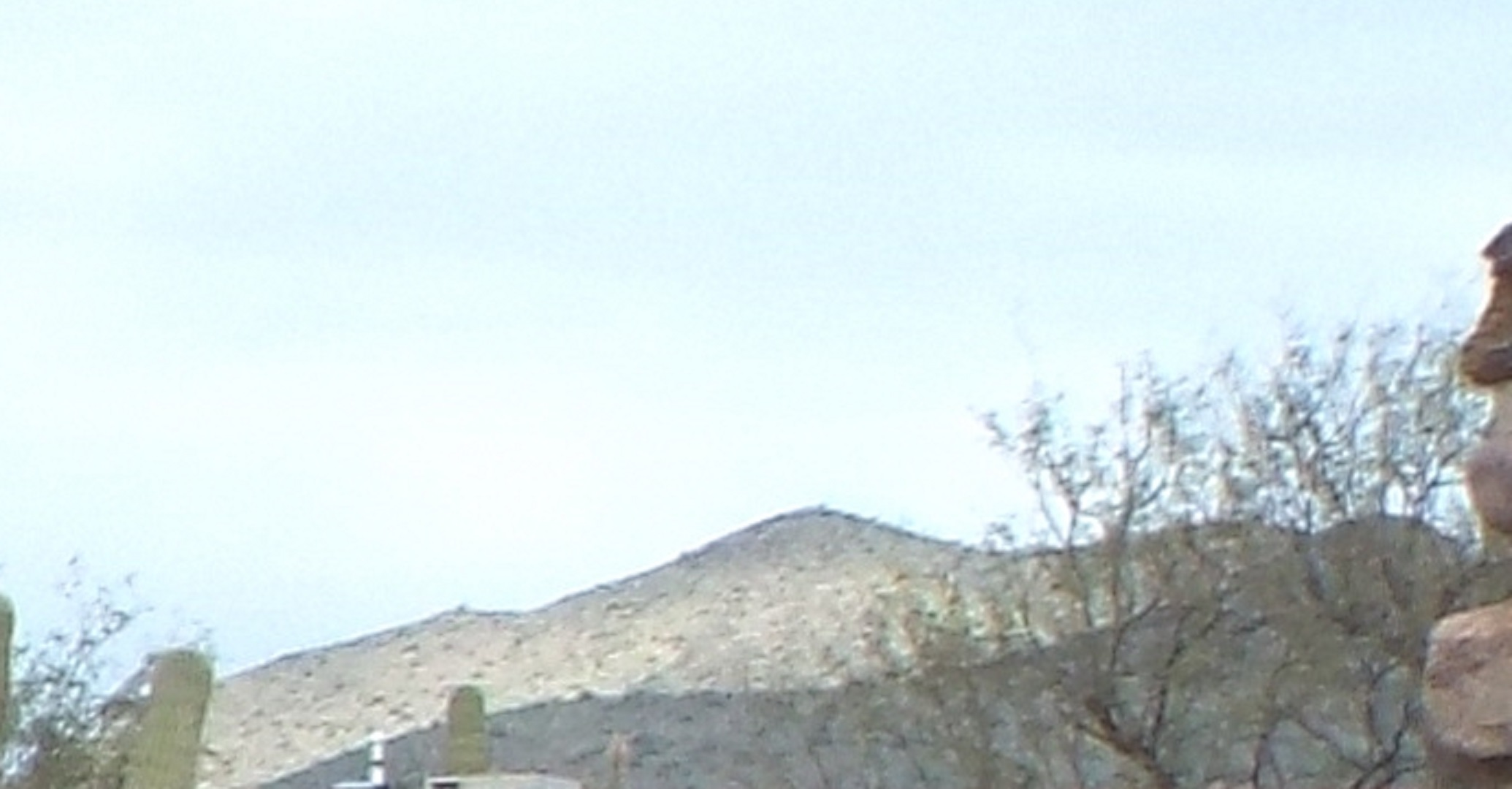
Daisy Mountain

- Cave Creek Regional Park
- Lake Pleasant Regional Park
- Wranglers Roost Stagecoach Stop (Established 1890)
- Spur Cross Ranch
- Daisy Mountain Preserve
- New River Kiwanis Park
- Gavilan Peak – Named in the 1880s, when the U.S. Cavalry and the Apaches fought a battle in the area. The name means "sparrow hawk" in Spanish and "hawk" in Apache.

== Education ==
It is in the Deer Valley Unified School District.

== Historic structures in New River ==
Pictured are some of the few remaining historic structures of New River.

Historic structures of New River, Arizona
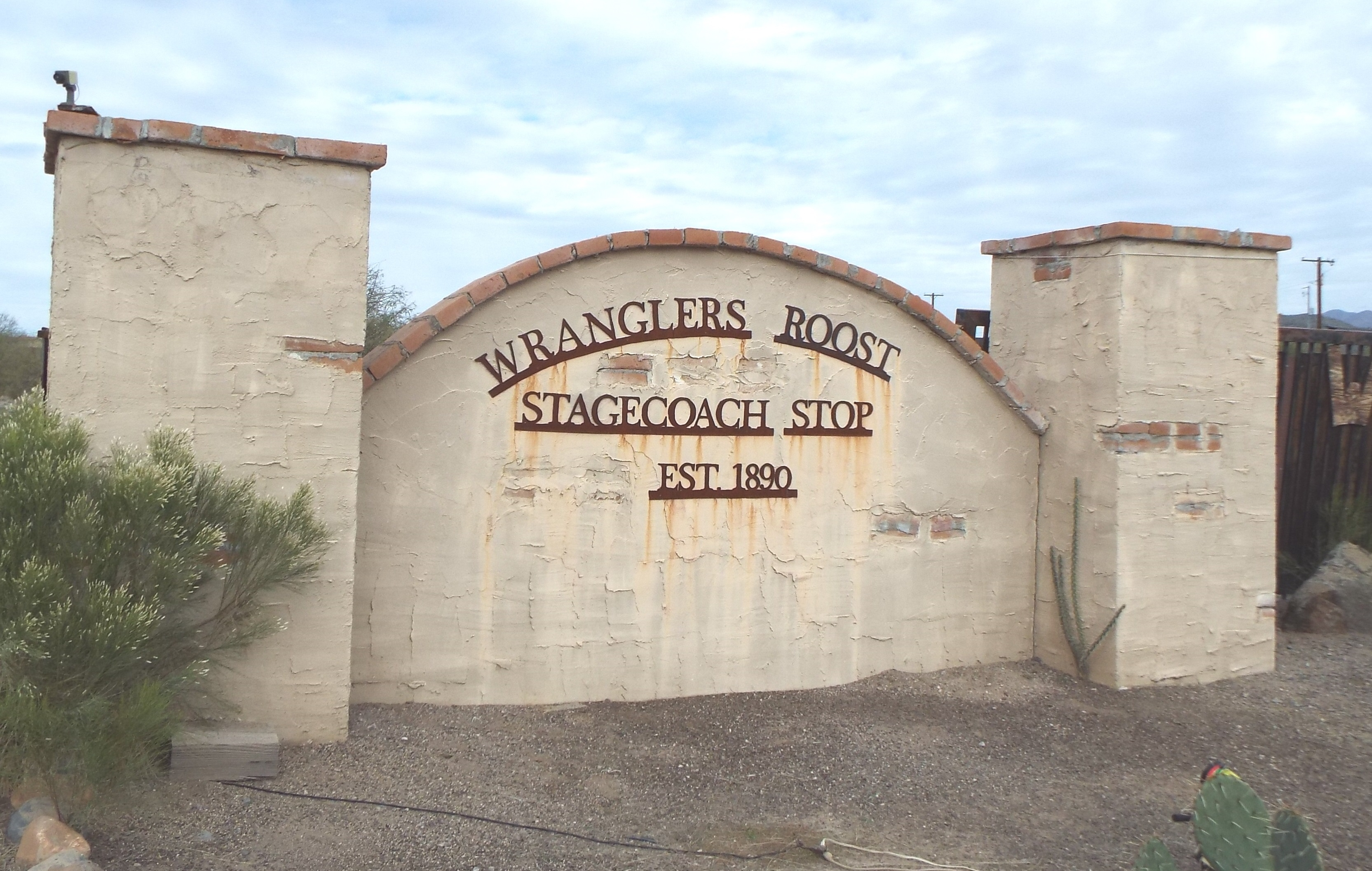
Front gate of the historic Wranglers Roost Stagecoach Stop

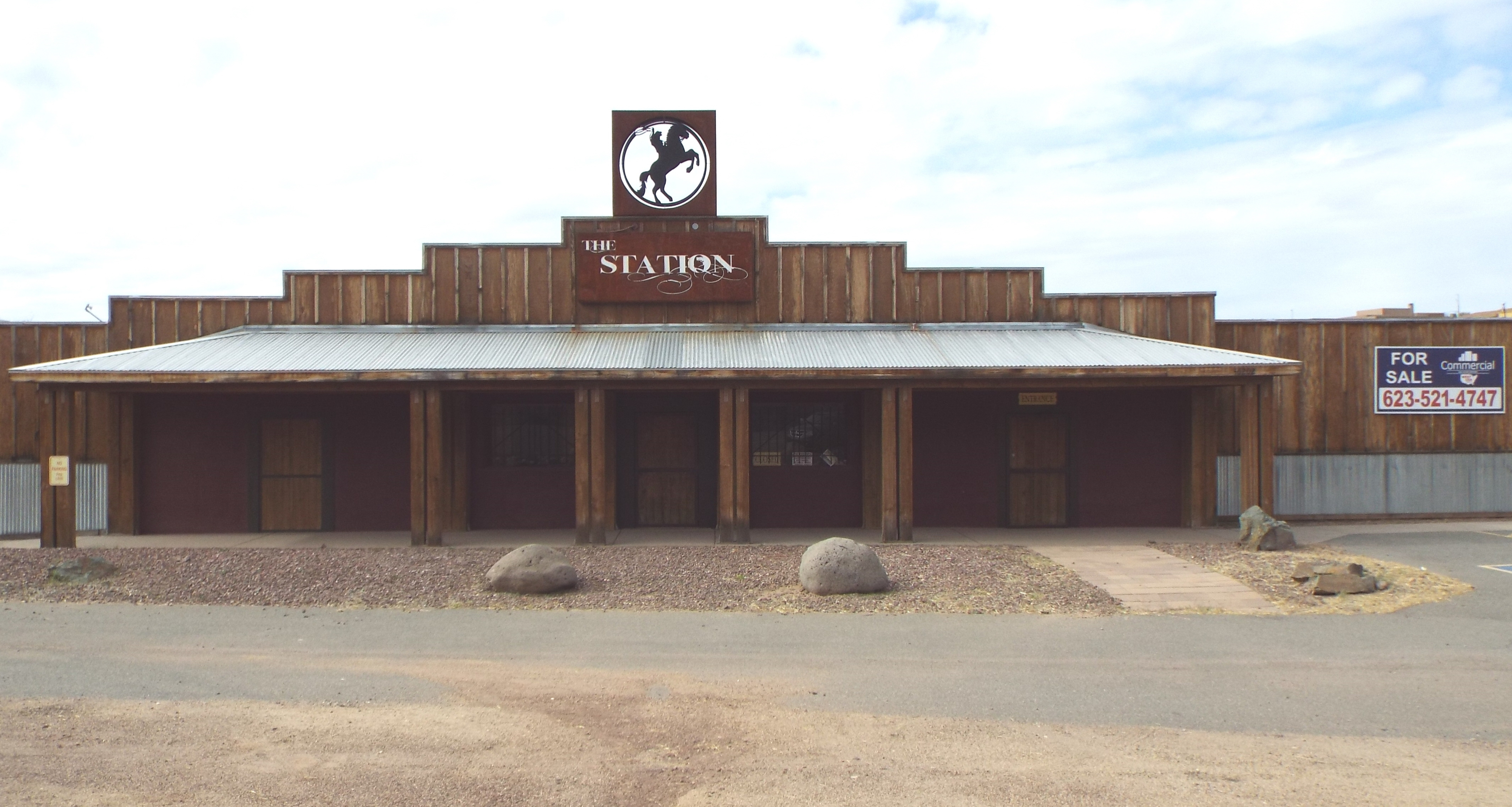
The Station

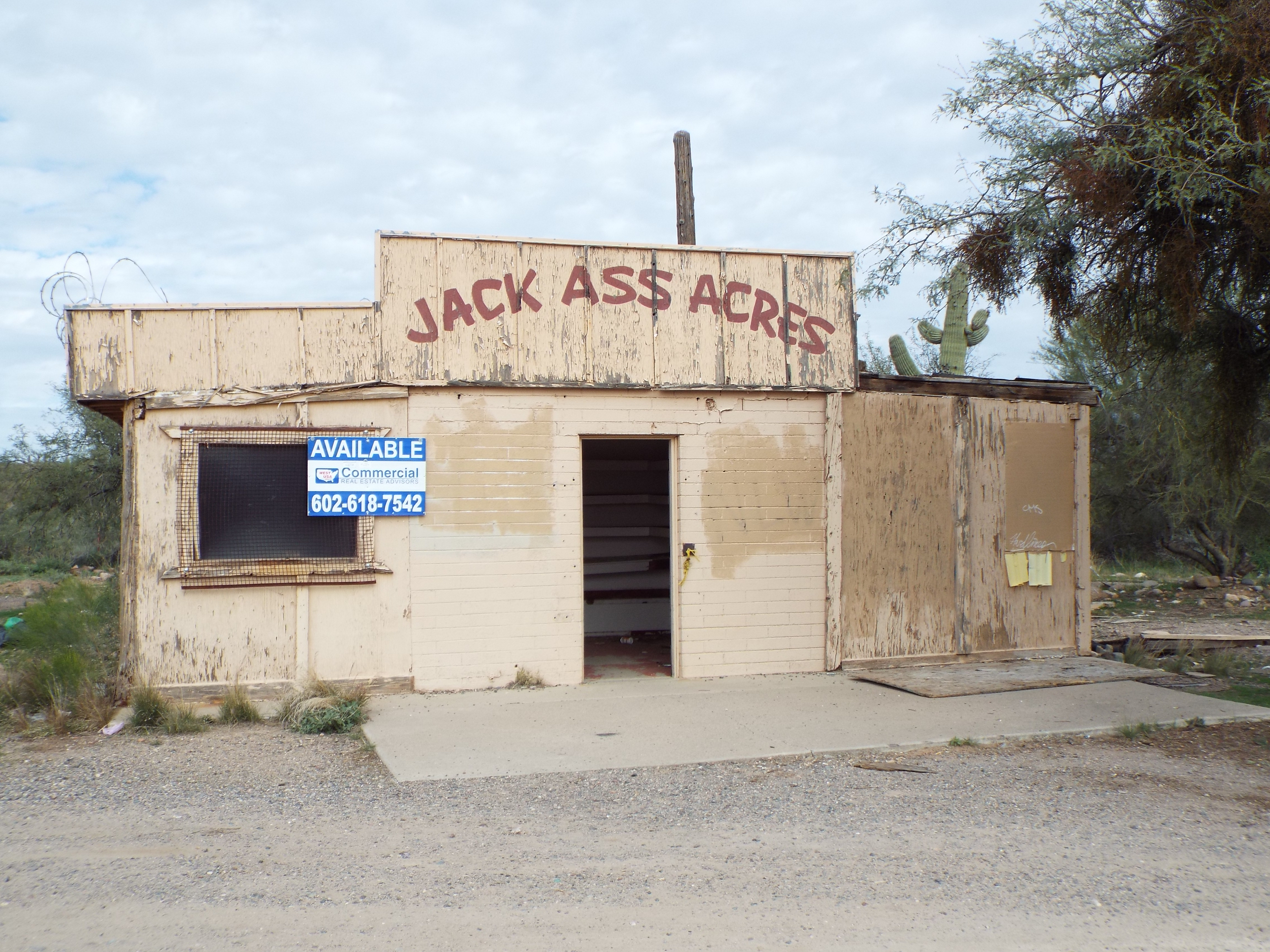
The Jack Ass Acres Service Station, which has since been demolished and replaced by a nearby Shell station

== See also ==
- List of rivers of Arizona
