= List of Rochester Institute of Technology alumni =

RIT Alumni Association logo

Rochester Institute of Technology has over 145,000 alumni from all 50 U.S. states and over 100 countries. This is a list of some notable alumni.

== Government ==
- John Cebrowski – member of the New Hampshire House of Representatives
- Brian Chontosh (2000) – United States Marine Corps officer, Navy Cross recipient
- Robert J. Duffy (1993) – lieutenant governor of New York (2011–2014); mayor, City of Rochester (2006–2010); past chief of police, City of Rochester
- David Egan (1962) – New York State Supreme Court justice
- Fiona Ma – California State Assembly majority whip, San Francisco politician
- Tom McMahon – mayor of Reading, Pennsylvania
- Rodney C. Moen – Wisconsin state senator

== Science and engineering ==
- Steve Capps (1980) – noted computer programmer and designer of the original Apple Macintosh computer
- Kate Gleason – engineer and businesswoman known both for being a revolutionary in the predominantly male field of engineering and for her philanthropy
- Alex Kipman (2001) – primary inventor of Kinect and HoloLens
- Rick Kittles (1989) – biologist specializing in human genetics
- Elan Lee (1998) – founder and creator of Exploding Kittens game; former chief design officer at Xbox Entertainment Studios; alternate reality game designer
- Patricia Moore (1974) – industrial designer, gerontologist and author of Disguised: A True Story (1985); recognized by i-D magazine as one of the "40 Most Socially Conscious Designers" in the world
- Ralph Peo – engineer, inventor, chairman and CEO of Houdaille Industries, 1957 alumnus of the year
- John Resig (2009) – creator of jQuery
- Grant Tremblay (2011) – astrophysicist specializing in black holes
- Steven Van Slyke (1988) – co-inventor of the organic light emitting diode (OLED) displays used in smartphones, digital cameras, HD and Ultra HDTVs

== Humanities ==
- Kwaku Alston (1994) – celebrity portrait photographer
- Barbara Astman (1970) – artist, photographer
- Ralph Avery (1928) – artist
- Bernie Boston (1955) – photojournalist, twice nominated for a Pulitzer Prize, including his 1967 Flower Power photo
- Marilyn Bridges (1979, 1981) – aerial photographer
- Dean Chamberlain (1977) – effect photographer
- Emma Lampert Cooper (1897) – painter
- Jeff Daly – chief designer of the Metropolitan Museum of Art
- Bruce Davidson – photographer
- Stan Grossfeld (1973) – two-time Pulitzer Prize-winning photojournalist with the Boston Globe in 1984 and 1985
- James D. Havens (ca 1920) – woodblock printmaker, painter, and first American insulin recipient
- N. Katherine Hayles (1966) – critical theorist
- Tom Hussey – photographer specializing in commercial advertising and lifestyle photography
- Kenneth Josephson (1932) – photographer; founder of the Society for Photographic Education
- Jeannette Klute – Kodak research photographer who helped develop the Dye-transfer process and demonstrated color photography as an art form
- Bryan Kocis – founder of Cobra Video
- Leon Lim – artist, contestant on Work of Art: The Next Great Artist
- Mary Lum – visual artist, recipient of Guggenheim Fellowship, professor at Bennington College
- Zwelethu Mthethwa (1989) – South African painter and photographer
- David Muench – landscape and nature photographer
- Elli Perkins – professional glass artist
- Fredericka Douglass Sprague Perry – activist, philanthropist
- Wallace Seawell (1940) – Hollywood photographer
- Daria Semegen – composer of classical music
- Ronald Senungetuk – Inupiat artist
- William Snyder (1981) – four-time Pulitzer Prize-winning photojournalist; director of photography, Dallas Morning News
- David Spindel – photographer
- Anthony Suau (1978) – Pulitzer Prize-winning photojournalist for feature photography with the Denver Post in 1978
- Marc Tedeschi (1976) – martial artist, designer, photographer, writer, educator
- Emily Thompson (1984) – associate professor of history, University of San Diego; 2005 MacArthur Foundation Fellow
- Jerry Uelsmann (1957) – photographer, darkroom artist and professor emeritus of the University of Florida
- Craig Varjabedian – photographer
- Eloise Wilkin (1923) – illustrator of Little Golden Books

== Social sciences ==
- Thomas R Keene – economist for Bloomberg News
- C. A. Tripp – psychologist and writer

== Arts & Design ==
- Kevin Auzenne – visual artist
- Chuck Baird (1974) – deaf artist and one of the founders of the De'VIA art movement
- Mike Battle (2002) – digital restoration artist
- Brian Bram – comic artist for American Splendor, founder of two interactive agencies in Boston
- Dorothy Feibleman (1973) – ceramics artist
- Sean Forbes (2008) – co-founder of D-PAN, the Deaf Professional Arts Network
- Kei Ito (2014) – contemporary photographer and installation artist
- Adam Kubert (1981) – comics artist known for his work for publishers such as Marvel Comics and DC Comics
- Elan Lee (1998) – alternate reality game designer
- Junco Sato Pollack – contemporary artist
- Kenneth Solov - Founder of Conlega Design
- David Spindel (born 1941), photographer
- Glynis Sweeny (1984) – illustrator and nationally recognized caricaturist
- Todd Chadwick Wilson – director
- Steve Matteson (1988) — typeface designer known for Open Sans and Curlz
- Eric Avar (1990) — Creative Director at Nike, Inc.

== Journalism & media ==
- Liz Bonis (1988) – reporter, WKRC-TV, Cincinnati (Clear Channel Communications), Channel 13 WHAM-TV
- Frederick Elmes (1986) – cinematographer, two-time winner of the Independent Spirit Award for Best Cinematography
- Gale Gand (1981) – cookbook author, chef and host of TV Food Network's Sweet Dreams
- Debra Meiburg – wine journalist, Master of Wine holder
- Michael Slovis (1976) – cinematographer and television director, including Breaking Bad
- Jack Van Antwerp (1986) – former director of photography for The Wall Street Journal
- Evan Vucci (2000) – chief photographer for the Associated Press
- Katie Linendoll (2005) – technology influencer

== Business ==
- Donald N. Boyce (1967) – chairman of the board, IDEX Corporation
- Daniel Carp (1973) – former chairman and CEO of the Eastman Kodak Company
- Tom Curley (1977) – president and CEO, Associated Press
- Rocky Dwyer – professor and business scholar
- Robert Fabbio (1985) – venture capitalist, founder of Tivoli Systems and WhileGlove Health
- Jeffrey K. Harris (1975) – vice president and managing director for Situational Awareness Systems, Lockheed Martin Integrated Systems and Solutions
- Austin McChord (2009) – founder and former CEO of Datto, a data backup and cybersecurity company that became Connecticut's first unicorn company; sold to Vista Equity Partners for $1.5 billion in 2017
- Ralph Peo (1915) – founder of Frontier Industries and former CEO and chairman of Houdaille Industries
- Mike Rundle – co-founder, 9rules Network
- Kevin Surace (1985) – entrepreneur, CEO of Appvance, CNBC Innovator of the Decade

== Sports ==
- Alex Crepinsek – National Lacrosse League player for the Minnesota Swarm
- Matt Hamill – champion wrestler at NCAA Division III and 2001 Summer Deaflympics; Ultimate Fighting Championship mixed martial artist
- Zach Miller – professional ultrarunner
- Steve Pinizzotto – Canadian professional ice hockey player
- Jerry Ragonese – Major League Lacrosse player for the Rochester Rattlers
- Chris Tanev – National Hockey League player for the Toronto Maple Leafs
- Steve Toll – National Lacrosse League Player
- John Williams – equestrian Olympic bronze medal winner
