= David Egan =

David Egan may refer to:

- David Egan (jockey), Irish jockey
- David Egan (judge), New York State Supreme Court justice
- David Egan (musician) (1954–2016), American singer-songwriter
- David Egan (soccer), American soccer player
