= Feibleman =

Feibleman is a surname. Notable people with the surname include:

- Dorothy Feibleman, American ceramics artist
- James Feibleman (1904–1987), American philosopher
- Peter Feibleman (1930–2015), American author and screenwriter
- Shirley Ann Grau (1929–2020), married surname Feibleman, American writer
