= Saunders College of Business =

- Motto: Business and Technology - Unlocked
- Type: Private
- Established: 1910
- Parent institution: Rochester Institute of Technology
- Dean: Jacqueline R. Mozrall
- Academic staff: 30
- Students: 2,400+
- Postgraduates: 346
- Location: Rochester, New York, United States; 43.0829°N 77.6772°W
- Website: saunders.rit.edu
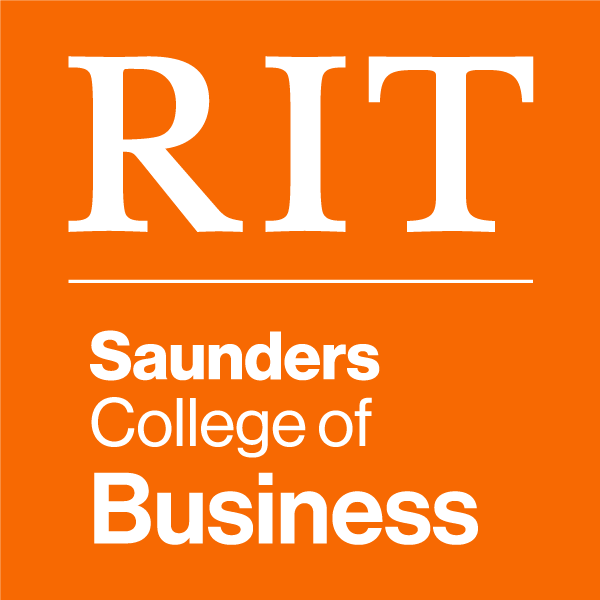

Saunders College of Business (or SCB) (formerly known as The E. Philip Saunders College of Business) is one of eleven colleges at Rochester Institute of Technology and is accredited by the Association to Advance Collegiate Schools of Business (AACSB). As of fall semester 2018, Saunders College of Business encompasses nearly 11% of RIT's enrollment, home to more than 2,000 undergraduate and graduate students enrolled in programs across RIT Global Campuses in Rochester, New York, Croatia, Dubai, and Kosovo.

Saunders College works in partnership with RIT’s entrepreneurial Venture Creations incubator and Albert J. Simone Center for Student Innovation and Entrepreneurship to integrate business education with RIT’s technical and creative programs. Saunders College offers undergraduate (BS), Masters (MS), Masters of Business Administration (MBA), and Executive MBA (EMBA) programs.

== History ==
The college dates back to 1910 with the establishment of the food administration and home economics departments at RIT. In 1952, RIT acquired the McKechnie-Lunger School of Commerce in Rochester, which was renamed after E. Philip Saunders in 2006. The college's dean is Jacqueline R. Mozrall. Hospitality and Tourism and Service Leadership programs were transitioned into the college from the College of Engineering Technology on July 1, 2019

== Undergraduate programs ==
- Accounting
- Accounting BS/MBA
- Business Administration*
- Business Analytics*
- Digital Business*
- Entrepreneurship*
- Finance
- Hospitality and Tourism Management
- Human Resource Management*
- International Business
- Management
- Management Information Systems
- Marketing
- Supply Chain Management
- Business Exploration

* Business minors only

== Graduate programs ==
Doctor of Philosophy (PhD)

- Business Administration (Specializations in Digital Transformation, Strategy and Innovation, and Finance and Accounting)

Masters in Business Administration (MBA)

- MBA
- Accelerated 4+1 MBA

Executive Education

- Executive MBA, on campus (EMBA)
- Executive MBA, online (OLEMBA)

Master of Science (MS)

- MS - Accounting
- MS - Business Analytics
- MS - Technology Innovation Management and Entrepreneurship
- MS - Finance
- MS - Global Supply Chain Management
- MS - Hospitality and Tourism
- MS - Management

Advanced Certificates

- Accounting and Financial Analytics
- Organizational Learning
- Service Leadership and Innovation
- Technology Entrepreneurship

== Research facilities ==
=== Center for Student Innovation and Entrepreneurship ===
The Albert J. Simone Center for Student Innovation and Entrepreneurship was established in 2007. It was named for Albert J. Simone, 8th president of RIT, in recognition of his contribution to academics and strong support of local business.

=== Center for Urban Entrepreneurship ===
The Center for Urban Entrepreneurship (CUE) is located in the downtown business district at 40 Franklin Street (the historic Rochester Savings Bank).

=== Leadership Academy @ Saunders ===
The leadership academy fosters innovative leadership for bridging business and technology. The academy is available to high school, undergraduate and graduate students, as well as alumni and employers.

=== Technology Management Center ===
The Technology Management Center focuses on three primary areas: information technology management, new product development, and science and technology policy. The center does basic and applied research and develops new teaching material in the area of Technology Innovation.

=== Institute for Business Ethics and Corporate Social Responsibility ===
The Institute for Business Ethics and Corporate social responsibility supports research and teaching at Saunders and focuses on the interdependent relationship between business and society.

=== Venture Creations ===
The Venture Creations incubator at RIT is a place where early to mid-seed stage companies can advance their concepts on the way to joining the ranks of profitable, viable businesses in New York State. Saunders students and faculty engage with VCI companies through Saunders Consulting Group, Capstone Projects, and provide additional real-world business exposure to the classroom.

== Rankings ==
=== Undergraduate programs ===
U.S. News & World Report #77 in the 2025 rankings of top undergraduate business programs.

Poets & Quants #59 in the 2025 Best Undergraduate Business Programs.

=== Graduate programs ===
Business school rankings

U.S. MBA Rankings
- QS (2026): 98
- U.S. News & World Report (2025): 100

Global MBA Rankings
- QS (2026): 301+

Bloomberg #73 in the 2025 Best B-Schools.

Fortune #76 in the 2023-2024 Best MBA program rankings.

Poets & Quants #98 in the 2023-2024 U.S. MBA program rankings.

U.S. News & World Report #100 in the 2025 Best Business Schools.

=== Online graduate programs ===
U.S. News & World Report #11 in 2025 online MBA rankings

Princeton Review #34 in 2023 top 50 online MBA programs

== Notable alumni ==
- William A. Buckingham (1964) – retired Executive Vice President of M&T Bank
- Daniel Carp (1973) – former Chairman and CEO of the Eastman Kodak Company
- Bal Dixit (1974) – Founder and Chairman of Newtex Industries, Inc.
- Tom Curley (1977) – President and CEO, Associated Press
- Jeffrey K. Harris (1975) – served as 11th Director of the National Reconnaissance Office
- Mike Rundle – co-founder, 9rules Network
- Kevin Surace (1985) – CEO of Appvance; 2009 Inc. Magazine Entrepreneur of the Year; CNBC Innovator of the Decade

== See also ==
- List of business schools in the United States
- Rochester Institute of Technology
