= Rio Vista, Phoenix =

Rio Vista
- Urban village of Phoenix, Arizona
- Rio Vista Village
- Location of Rio Vista highlighted in red.
- Coordinates: 33.886°N 112.149°W
- Country: United States
- State: Arizona
- County: Maricopa
- City: Phoenix
- Website: Rio Vista Village Planning Committee

Rio Vista Village ("river view") is the fifteenth designated urban village of Phoenix, Arizona, located in the northern part of the city. The village consists primarily of largely undeveloped land, and is located near the unincorporated master-planned community of Anthem. Developed areas include the Anthem Commerce Park, Anthem Outlets, and the Anthem West single-family home community. Much of the undeveloped land is owned by the Arizona State Land Department.

Rio Vista Village is bounded Table Mesa Road the north, Interstate 17 on the east, an irregular area on the south bounded by Desert Hills Drive, Pyramid Peak Parkway, and Carefree Highway, and New River Road and 75th Avenue on the west.
