= Deer Valley Unified School District =

School district in Maricopa County, Arizona

Deer Valley Unified School District (DVUSD)

Location
- 20402 N 15th Avenue Phoenix, Arizona, 85027; United States

District information
- Motto: Extraordinary
- Grades: Pre-K–12
- Superintendent: Curtis Finch Jr.
- Accreditations: AdvancED/Cognia but is recognized for educational excellence, holding an 'A' Grade from the AZ Dept of Education, showing strong state test performance, and earning a U.S. News Best Middle School badge for strong academic outcomes
- Schools: 42

Students and staff
- Students: 32,953
- Staff: 4,042
- Student–teacher ratio: 21 students for every 1 teacher

Other information
- Website: www.dvusd.org

Deer Valley Unified School District #97 (DVUSD) is a Pre-K–12 school district, headquartered in Phoenix, Arizona, United States. DVUSD is the fifth largest school district in the state of Arizona, serving areas of Phoenix (including Deer Valley, North Gateway, and Rio Vista), Glendale, Peoria, Cave Creek and numerous unincorporated areas of northwest Maricopa County, including Anthem, New River, and Desert Hills. Situated within the Sonoran Desert, the District has grown from its modest beginnings as a county accommodation school located in New River in 1934 to 42 campuses serving 34,000 students: 15 K–6 elementary schools, 19 K–8 schools, three middle schools, and five comprehensive high schools, plus an online K-12 school and 2 alternative schools. Early childhood education opportunities are offered through DVUSD Community Education Preschool/PreKindergarten (15 sites), and Head Start (five sites). Twelve schools receive Title I funding. District facilities include District Office, Support Services Center, Transportation and Administrative Services.

== Attendance area ==
As of 1984 the Cañon Elementary School District sends high school students and junior high level special education students to DVUSD. In 1984, 27 students from Cañon attended DVUSD. That year Deer Valley sued Cañon, which stated it was unable to pay for the tuition costs of the district and acknowledged that it was billed for the correct amount. The Arizona Republic described this as a "friendly lawsuit", since according to the DVUSD officials, Cañon district officials stated that the lawsuit was the only mechanism through which it could pay DVUSD.

== Schools ==
=== K–6 schools ===
- Arrowhead Elementary School
- Constitution Elementary School
- Copper Creek Elementary School
- Desert Sage Elementary School
- Esperanza Elementary School
- Greenbrier Elementary School
- Las Brisas Elementary School
- Legend Springs Elementary School
- Mirage Elementary School
- Mountain Shadows Elementary School
- New River Elementary School
- Park Meadows Elementary School
- Sunrise Elementary School
- The Traditional Academy at Bellair
- Village Meadows Elementary School

=== K–8 schools ===
- Anthem School
- Canyon Springs STEM Academy
- Desert Mountain School
- Diamond Canyon School
- Gavilan Peak School
- Highland Lakes School
- Inspiration Mountain School
- Norterra Canyon School
- Paseo Hills School
- Sierra Verde STEAM School
- Sonoran Foothills School
- Stetson Hills School
- Sunset Ridge School
- Terramar Academy of the Arts
- Union Park School
- West Wing School

=== K-12 schools ===
- Vista Peak School
- Aspire- Deer Valley's Online Academy

=== Middle schools ===
- Deer Valley Middle School
- Desert Sky Middle School
- Hillcrest Middle School

=== High schools ===
- Barry Goldwater High School
  - The Barry Goldwater High School is named after the 1964 presidential candidate Barry Goldwater. It is part of the Deer Valley Unified School District and opened in 1986. The school offers the International Baccalaureate (IB) Diploma Program.

Boulder Creek High School
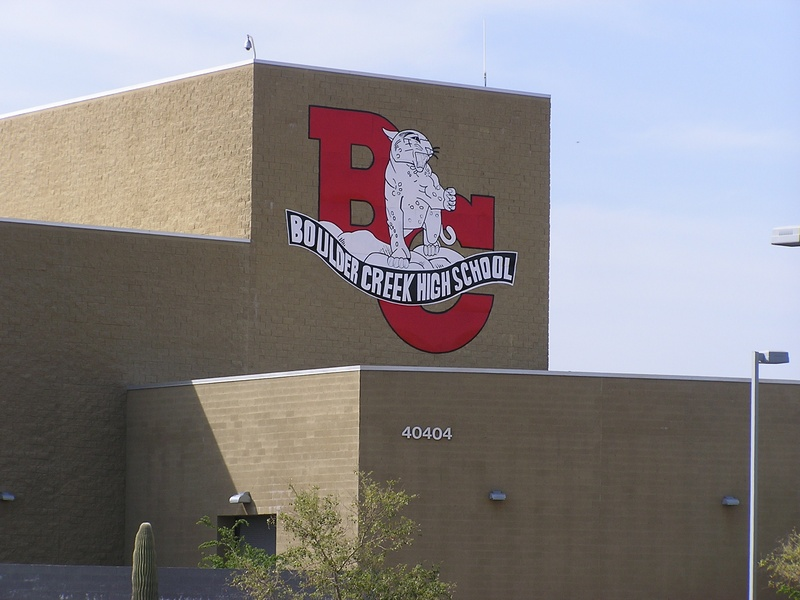

Location
- 40404 N. Gavilan Peak Parkway; 85086; 33°51′09″N 112°08′25″W

Information
- Established: 2004; 22 years ago
- Enrollment: 2,297 (2023-2024)
- Colors: Black, white and red
- Website: www.dvusd.org/bchs

- Boulder Creek High School
  - The Boulder Creek High School serves grades 9-12 for the Deer Valley Unified School District. The school has been rated A+ by the AEF as of February 15 2024. Boulder Creek's Jaguars are members of the Arizona Interscholastic Association (AIA) and compete in the Desert Valley Conference. School colors are red, black and white.
- Deer Valley High School
- Mountain Ridge High School
- Sandra Day O’Connor High School

== Specialized programs ==
- Vista Peak (Alternative Blended Learning Environment)
- International Baccalaureate Program at Barry Goldwater High School
- Aspire Deer Valley's Online Academy
- The Traditional Academy at Bellair opened March 2022.

== Language immersion schools ==
Deer Valley Unified School District offers 6 schools with language immersion programs. Five of the schools offer Mandarin to students and one school with a Spanish immersion program. The schools with a language immersion program are Desert Sage Elementary, Hillcrest Middle School, Sandra Day O'Connor High School, Deer Valley High School, Mountain Ridge High School, Barry Goldwater High School, Gavilan Peak, and Boulder Creek High School. The immersion program, half of the day the students are taught in the targeted language being learned and the other half of the day is taught in their native language.
