= Anthem, Arizona =

Place in Arizona, United States

- Census-designated place
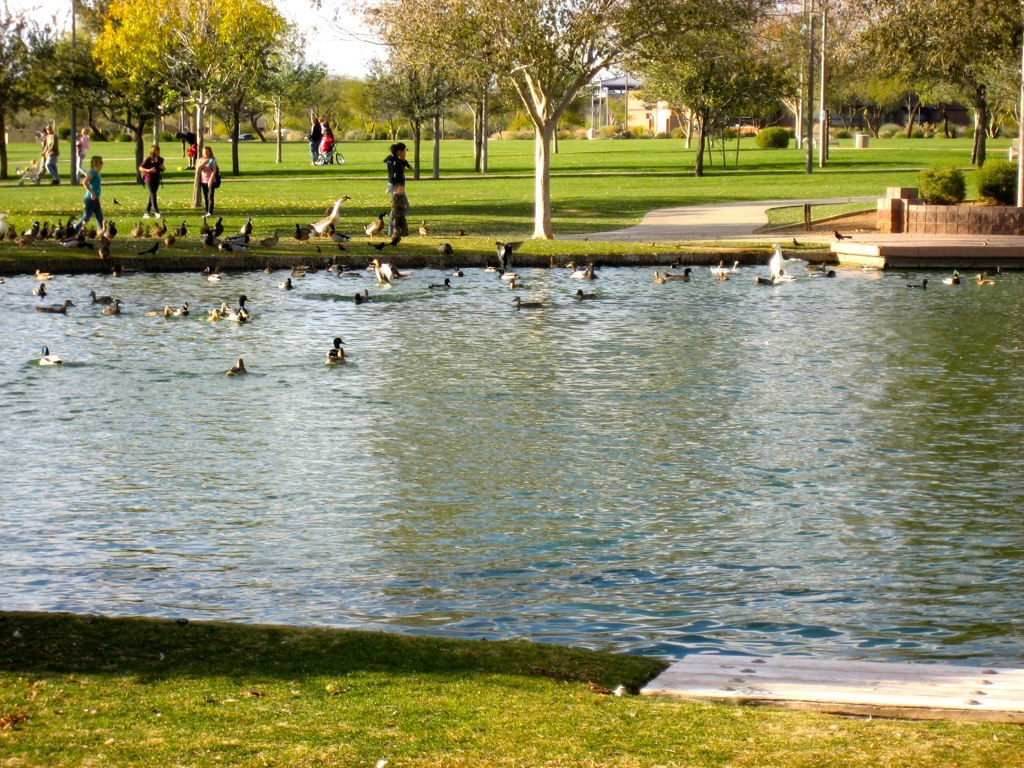
- Anthem Park

- Location in Maricopa County, Arizona

- Location within Arizona Location within the United States
- Coordinates: 33°52′2″N 112°8′49″W
- Country: United States
- State: Arizona
- County: Maricopa

Area
  - Total: 7.92 sq mi (20.51 km^{2})
  - Land: 7.92 sq mi (20.50 km^{2})
  - Water: 0.0039 sq mi (0.01 km^{2})
- Elevation: 1,864 ft (568 m)

Population (2020)
  - Total: 23,190
  - Density: 2,929.6/sq mi (1,131.12/km^{2})
- Time zone: UTC-7 (Mountain Standard Time (no DST))
- ZIP codes: 85086, 85087
- Area code: 623
- FIPS code: 04-02430
- GNIS feature ID: 2054803

Anthem is a planned community and census-designated place in Maricopa County, Arizona, United States, within the Phoenix Metropolitan Area. As of the 2020 census, the population of Anthem was 23,190.

== History ==
Anthem was developed by Del Webb in 1998 as a master-planned community in the foothills approximately 30 miles (48 km) north of downtown Phoenix. Anthem has been described as one of the best places to raise a family by Parenting magazine and one of the best family friendly neighborhoods in the Phoenix area by Phoenix Magazine.

Anthem is well known for its year-round activities, primarily geared towards families. The community center offers youth soccer, baseball, basketball, tennis, various forms of martial arts, and swimming amongst other activities for children as young as toddlers. Homeowner's association dues cover a pool larger than Olympic size, a community water park with slides and various depths for all swimming levels, paths that crisscross the town, bike paths that circle all major streets, and pocket parks scattered throughout the town. In addition, there is a 63-acre community park complete with an amphitheater, many grassy areas, volleyball, soccer, football, baseball, pickleball and little league fields along with a train, pavilion, lakes and pagodas. More recently built, are the pickleball courts at the Anthem Community Center. The facility now has 14 outdoor concrete courts that are fully dedicated to pickleball, with permanent lines and nets. The courts are private and operate on a first-come, first-served basis, as they cannot be reserved. Players also have convenient access to restrooms, water, and court lighting.

On July 31, 2012, a storm dropped 5.01 inches (127 mm) of rain on Anthem in the span of 90 minutes, causing widespread flooding that damaged homes and required the rescue of nine people. A subsequent investigation into the flood concluded that the storm was a "one-in-1,000 year rain catastrophe".

== Geography ==
Anthem is built on 5,856 acres (9.2 mi^{2}) at the base of Daisy Mountain and Gavilan Peak in northern Maricopa County. The CDP portion of Anthem has an area of 7.9 square miles (20 km^{2}). The community's elevation ranges from 1,760 to 2,428 feet (536 to 740 m), with an average elevation of 1,863 feet (568 m). Approximately 36 percent of the community is preserved as open space, including 291 acres (118 ha) of open hillside.

The community is bordered on the north, east and south by the New River CDP, while the western portion of the community is located within Phoenix city limits.

=== Climate ===
Due to its higher elevation in the Northern part of the Sonoran Desert, Anthem is slightly cooler and receives a higher level of rainfall than areas of Phoenix to the south.

Climate data for Anthem, Arizona (estimates)
Month	Jan	Feb	Mar	Apr	May	Jun	Jul	Aug	Sep	Oct	Nov	Dec	Year
Mean daily maximum °F (°C)	65.0 (18.3)	68.5 (20.3)	73.0 (22.8)	81.0 (27.2)	90.7 (32.6)	99.9 (37.7)	103.2 (39.6)	100.9 (38.3)	96.2 (35.7)	86.1 (30.1)	73.2 (22.9)	65.2 (18.4)	83.6 (28.7)
Mean daily minimum °F (°C)	39.5 (4.2)	41.9 (5.5)	45.3 (7.4)	50.6 (10.3)	59.1 (15.1)	67.8 (19.9)	75.6 (24.2)	74.3 (23.5)	68.7 (20.4)	57.8 (14.3)	46.3 (7.9)	39.7 (4.3)	55.6 (13.1)
Average rainfall inches (mm)	1.34 (34)	1.41 (36)	1.54 (39)	0.51 (13)	0.18 (4.6)	0.14 (3.6)	1.08 (27)	1.76 (45)	1.01 (26)	0.97 (25)	1.02 (26)	1.38 (35)	12.34 (313)
Source: Anthem News

== Demographics ==
Historical population
Census	Pop.	Note	%±
2010	21,700		—
2020	23,190		6.9%
U.S. Decennial Census

=== Racial and ethnic composition ===
Anthem CDP, Arizona – Racial composition Note: the US Census treats Hispanic/Latino as an ethnic category. This table excludes Latinos from the racial categories and assigns them to a separate category. Hispanics/Latinos may be of any race.
Race / Ethnicity (NH = Non-Hispanic)	2020	2010
White alone (NH)	80.3% (18,630)	83.8% (18,176)
Black alone (NH)	1.9% (431)	1.8% (382)
American Indian alone (NH)	0.4% (90)	0.5% (100)
Asian alone (NH)	2.4% (559)	2.5% (548)
Pacific Islander alone (NH)	0.1% (31)	0.1% (23)
Other race alone (NH)	0.5% (109)	0.1% (19)
Multiracial (NH)	4.8% (1,112)	2.1% (455)
Hispanic/Latino (any race)	9.6% (2,228)	9.2% (1,997)

=== 2020 census ===
As of the 2020 census, Anthem had a population of 23,190. The median age was 46.1 years. 23.7% of residents were under the age of 18 and 22.7% of residents were 65 years of age or older. For every 100 females there were 93.1 males, and for every 100 females age 18 and over there were 90.8 males age 18 and over.

100.0% of residents lived in urban areas, while 0.0% lived in rural areas.

There were 8,461 households in Anthem, of which 33.5% had children under the age of 18 living in them. Of all households, 65.4% were married-couple households, 11.0% were households with a male householder and no spouse or partner present, and 18.3% were households with a female householder and no spouse or partner present. About 17.1% of all households were made up of individuals and 10.0% had someone living alone who was 65 years of age or older.

There were 9,278 housing units, of which 8.8% were vacant. The homeowner vacancy rate was 1.4% and the rental vacancy rate was 6.8%.

Racial composition as of the 2020 census
Race	Number	Percent
White	19,255	83.0%
Black or African American	446	1.9%
American Indian and Alaska Native	126	0.5%
Asian	585	2.5%
Native Hawaiian and Other Pacific Islander	32	0.1%
Some other race	506	2.2%
Two or more races	2,240	9.7%
Hispanic or Latino (of any race)	2,228	9.6%

=== 2010 census ===
Anthem first appeared on the 2010 U.S. Census as a census-designated place (CDP).

As of the 2010 census, there were 21,700 people, 7,451 households, and 6,037 families residing in the community. The racial makeup of the city was 89.7% White, 2.9% African American, 0.6% Native American, 2.6% Asian, 2.1% from other races, and 3.0% from two or more races. Hispanic or Latino of any race were 9.2% of the population. There were 7,451 households, out of which 46.2% had children under the age of 18 living with them, 67.4% were married couples living together, 9.2% had a female householder with no husband present, 4.4% had a male householder with no wife present, and 19.0% were non-families. 14.7% of all households were made up of individuals living alone, and 4.4% had someone living alone who was 65 years of age or older. The average household size was 2.91 and the average family size was 3.24. The median age in the community was 36.8 years.

=== Education ===
According to the American Community Survey, 11.8% of residents had attained a graduate or professional degree as their highest degree, 27.7% had a bachelor's degree, 7.8% had an associate degree, 26.9% had some college but no degree, 20.4% had only a high school diploma, and 5.5% had less than a high school diploma.

== Economy ==
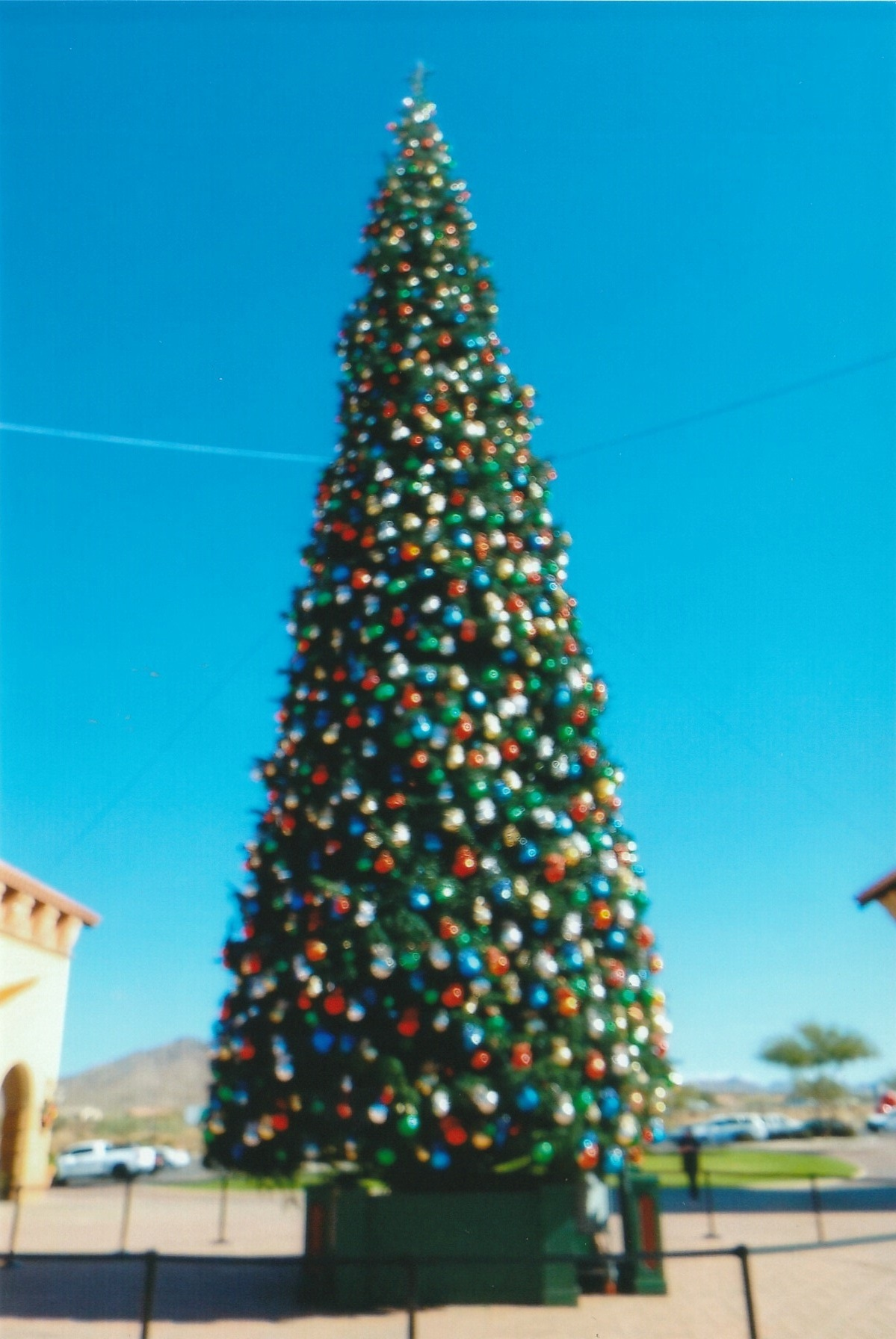
The Anthem Christmas tree is the tallest in Arizona.

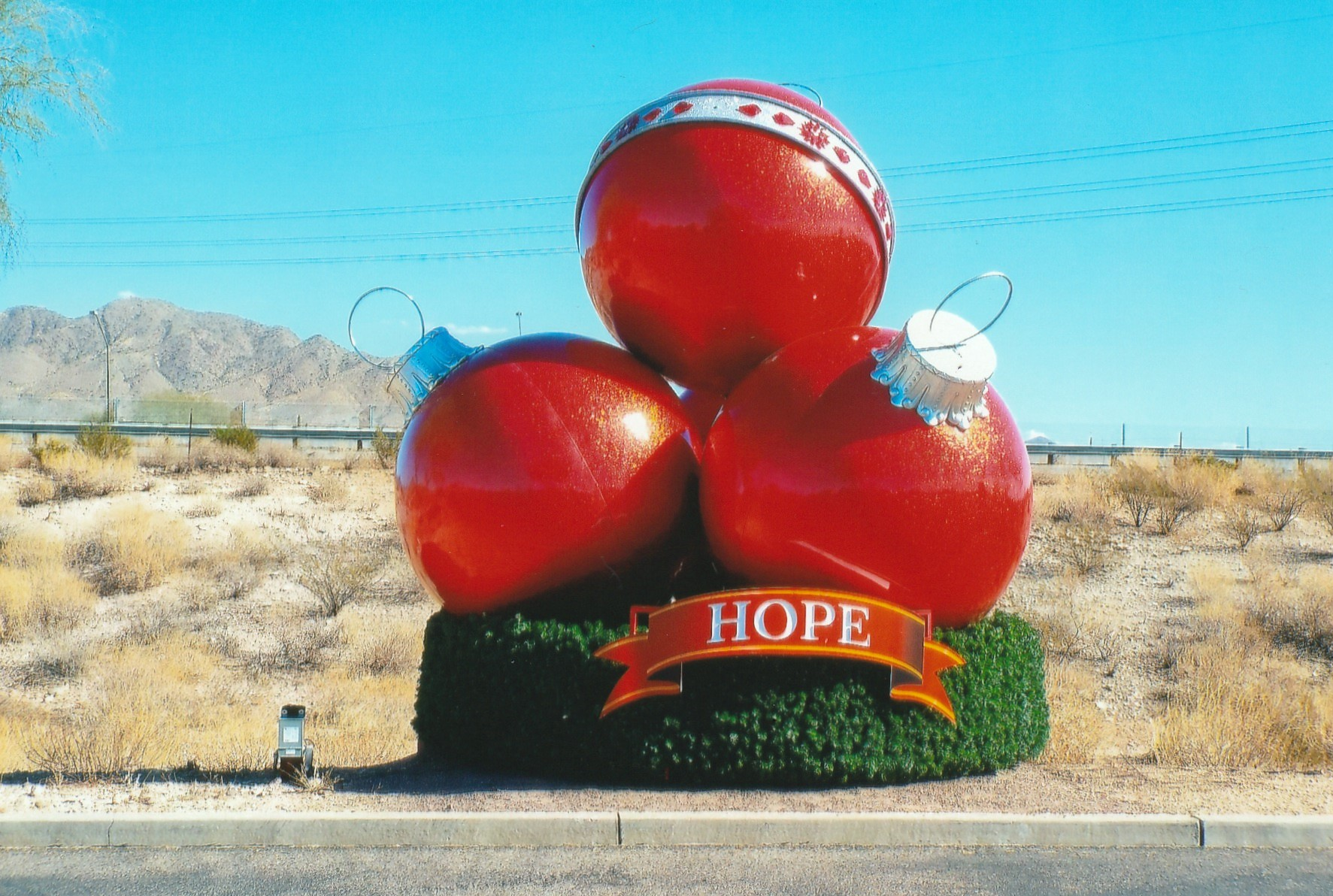
Traditional giant Christmas decoration in Anthem

The Anthem Christmas tree, installed every year at the Outlets North Phoenix, is the tallest in the state, and is often listed as the tallest Christmas tree in the Arizona. The tree, recognized as the tallest fresh-cut tree in the state, will be adorned with thousands of ornaments, 10,000 LED lights, and topped with a three-foot copper star.

Preparing it is a weeks-long effort that takes hundreds of hours, using specially designed industrial wiring to keep it secure, fire retardant treatments, and other safety measures to ensure it can safely be enjoyed all season long. Major retailers like Walmart and Fry's operate in Anthem.

== Government ==
Anthem is split into three main subdivisions. Parkside, Country Club and the Village. Each subdivision has its own homeowner's association and each of these elects a board of directors consisting of five members. From the five directors on each board, a president, vice-president, secretary and treasurer is elected.

Both Parkside and Country Club homeowners' associations elect three representatives, while the village homeowner's association elects one representative, to the seven member Anthem Community Council Board of Directors. Those seven Anthem Community Council Directors elect one of those representatives who serves as president of that board and is considered the highest authority in Anthem. Other positions within the council's board consist of vice-president, secretary and treasurer.

Parkside, one of the subdivisions of Anthem has homes west and east of Interstate 17. The east is served by Maricopa County, and the west is served by the City of Phoenix. The Anthem Community Council, a nonprofit community association, establishes plans and policies for the community and manages community assets. It also serves as the community's legislative body, but is mainly restricted to making laws that only apply to the three homeowner Associations of Anthem.

There are more than 20 neighborhoods in Anthem including Jubilation, Inspiration and Arroyo Grande.

The portions of Anthem that lie east of Interstate 17 receive police service from the Maricopa County Sheriff's Office and fire service from the Daisy Mountain Fire Department. Portions of Anthem west of Interstate 17 receive both police and fire service from the City of Phoenix Water and sewer utilities are provided by a private utility, EPCOR Water on the east side and City of Phoenix services on the west side of I-17.

== Education ==
Anthem is served by the Deer Valley Unified School District (DVUSD), as well as several private and charter schools. The nearest colleges and universities are Glendale Community College, Paradise Valley Community College, and Arizona State University at the West campus.

=== DVUSD schools ===
- Anthem School (K–8)
- Canyon Springs STEM Academy (K–8)
- Diamond Canyon School (K–8)
- Gavilan Peak School (K–8)
- New River Elementary School (K–8)
- Boulder Creek High School (9–12)

=== Charter schools ===
- Great Hearts Anthem (K–12)
- Archway Academy (K–5)
- Caurus Academy (K–12)
- Ridgeline Academy (K–12)

=== Private schools ===
- Creative Castle Preschool and Kindergarten
- North Valley Christian Academy (Preschool, K–12)

== Transportation ==
Interstate 17 is the primary connection between Anthem and Downtown Phoenix. A frontage road running along the east side of Interstate 17 and connecting Carefree Highway in North Gateway to Gavilan Peak Parkway in Anthem opened in October 2009. This frontage road connects to North Valley Parkway and Norterra Parkway in North Gateway, providing Anthem with surface street access to the rest of the Phoenix metropolitan area. Valley Metro does not provide bus service to Anthem; however, the agency can provide a vehicle for vanpooling service.

== Memorial ==
The Anthem Veterans Memorial is a monument dedicated to honoring the sacrifice and service made by members of the United States Armed Forces. The memorial's five white pillars represent the nation's military branches and are arranged in the Department of Defense order of precedence. Each pillar has an elliptical opening that slants downward toward the Great Seal of the United States. On Veterans Day (November 11), the design allows the sun's rays to spotlight the Great Seal at precisely 11:11 AM.

== Notable people ==
- Erik Affholter, professional football player
- Joshua Braun, professional basketball player
- Don Kassing, academic and university administrator
- Lori Klein, politician
- David Spindel, photographer
