= North Valley Parkway =

Roadway in Maricopa County, Arizona

North Valley Parkway Gavilan Peak Parkway
- Black Canyon Highway

Route information
- Maintained by MCDOT
- Length: 16.5 mi (26.6 km) 2.9 mi (4.67 km) as Old Stage Road
- Existed: 2008–present
- History: Completion expected in 2020

Major junctions
- South end: Jomax Road in Phoenix
- Carefree Highway in Phoenix
- North end: Old Stage Road in New River

Location
- Country: United States
- State: Arizona

Highway system
- Arizona State Highway System; Interstate; US; State; Scenic Proposed; Former

The North Valley Parkway, also named the Gavilan Peak Parkway are two names for a single section of arterial parkway in Phoenix and Anthem, Arizona, generally running parallel to the Interstate 17 (I-17) from Jomax Road to north of New River Road for approximately 15 miles (24.14 km). In the last three years, the parkway has undergone changes from a series of non-contiguous partially unpaved segments of dead end drives into a major alternative route to the often congested I-17 in the North Valley. The parkway is expected to be fully completed by 2020. The parkway follows the alignments of 23rd, 27th, and 35th Avenues in the Maricopa County street grid.

== Route description ==
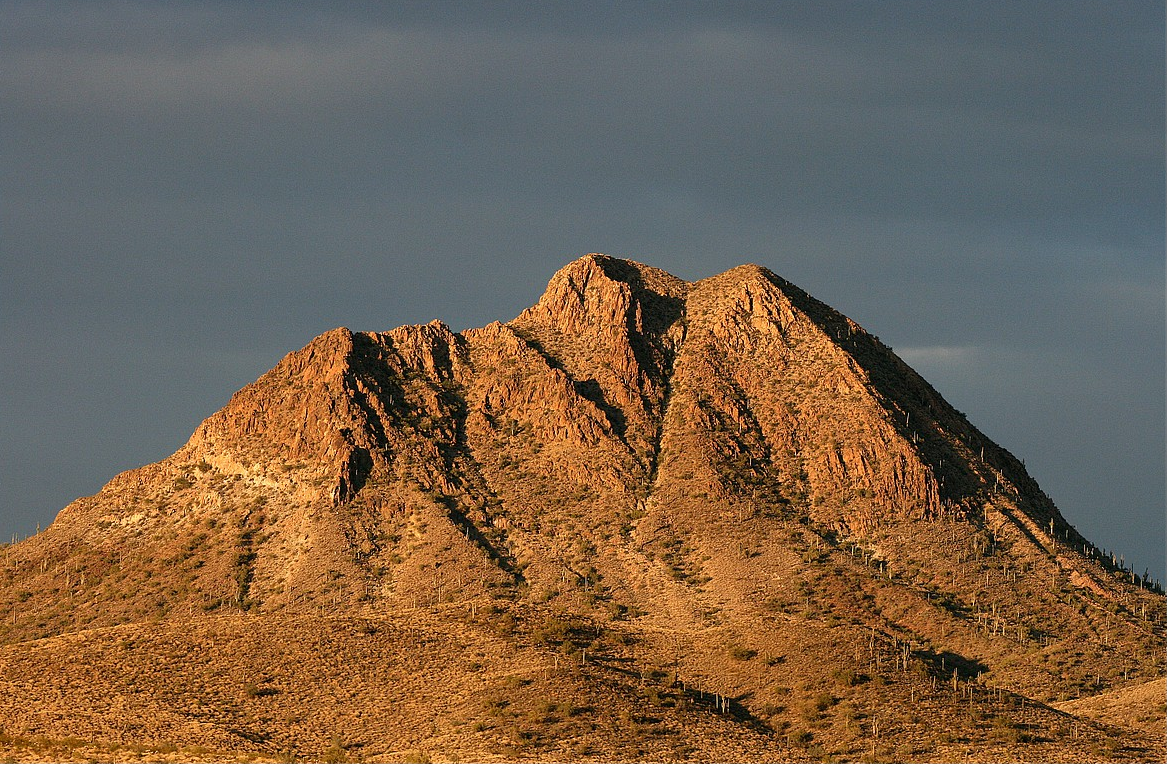
Gavilan Peak, the parkway's namesake, in New River

The parkway varies from two to five lanes, both divided and undivided, and also includes bicycle lanes.

=== North Valley section ===
North Valley Parkway begins at Jomax Road in northern Phoenix as a continuation of 19th Avenue. A six-lane bridge over the Central Arizona Project Canal was completed in December 2011. Heading north as a six-lane divided boulevard, the road temporarily narrows to just two lanes as it approaches Dixileta Drive where it temporarily narrows to two lanes, but widens to four lanes to intersect Sonoran Desert Drive, a surface road that connects to the Bob Stump Memorial Parkway (Loop 303). North of Dove Valley Road, traffic temporarily detours onto 27th Drive due to lack of funding of a bridge over Skunk Creek.. At the Carefree Highway (former SR 74), the parkway resumes its original route as a four lane undivided road providing access to Tramonto Marketplace, a local shopping center. Soon after, the road jogs west and closely parallels the Black Canyon Highway (I-17), providing a connection to the interstate highway via Pioneer Road and exit 225. At this intersection, the road changes names to the Gavilan Peak Parkway.

=== Gavilan Peak section ===
Named for the nearby mountain, the Gavilan Peak Parkway continues north in similar character until it becomes divided road once again while entering the unincorporated community of Anthem. The road jogs back east, providing access to many homes in the area, before intersecting Daisy Mountain Drive, which also connects back to I-17. In Anthem, the road serves traffic Boulder Creek High School and Anthem Marketplace. Soon after intersecting Anthem Way, the road narrows to two lanes and becomes Black Canyon Highway, a two-way frontage road flanking I-17. Now in New River, the road intersects New River Road and dead-ends just north of New River Elementary School. The road continues north as Old Stage Road, an unpaved road providing access to some homes and the New River Nature Reserve.

== Major intersections ==
The entire route is in Maricopa County.

| Location | mi | km | Destinations | Notes |
|---|---|---|---|---|
| Phoenix | 0.00 | 0.00 | Jomax Road / 19th Avenue south | Road continues south as 19th Avenue |
| Phoenix | 0.20 | 0.32 | Central Arizona Project Canal Bridge | |
| Phoenix | 3.30 | 5.31 | Sonoran Desert Drive | Connects to Loop 303 and I-17 |
| Phoenix | 1.4-mile (2.25 km) connection made via 27th Drive and Carefree Highway | | | |
| Phoenix | 6.10 | 9.82 | Carefree Highway | To SR 74 and I-17 |
| Anthem | 7.80 | 12.55 | Pioneer Road | Road name transitions from North Valley Parkway to Gavilan Peak Parkway |
| Anthem | 12.40 | 19.96 | Rushmore Drive | Road name transitions from Gavilan Peak Parkway to Black Canyon Highway |
| New River | 15.20 | 24.46 | New River Road | To I-17 |
| New River | 16.50 | 26.55 | Old Stage Road | Road name transitions from Black Canyon Highway to Old Stage Road and becomes unpaved |
| New River | 19.40 | 31.22 | Table Mesa Road | Terminus of right-of-way |
1.000 mi = 1.609 km; 1.000 km = 0.621 mi: Route transition
