= Agateware =

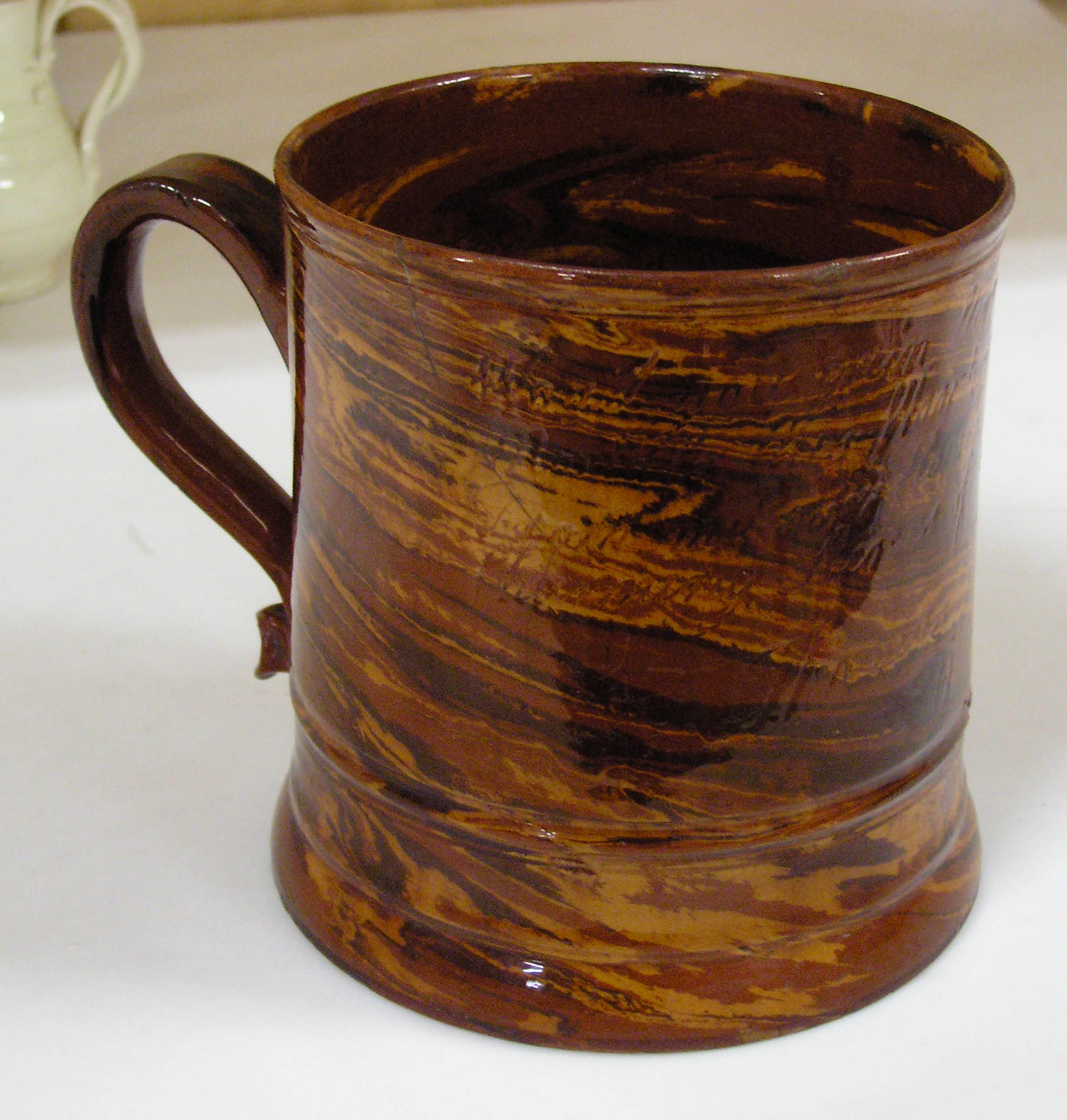
Agateware mug

Agateware is pottery decorated with a combination of contrasting colored clays.

The name agateware is derived from the agate stone, which when sliced shows multicolored layers. This pottery technique allows for both precise and thought out patterns, and free random effects.

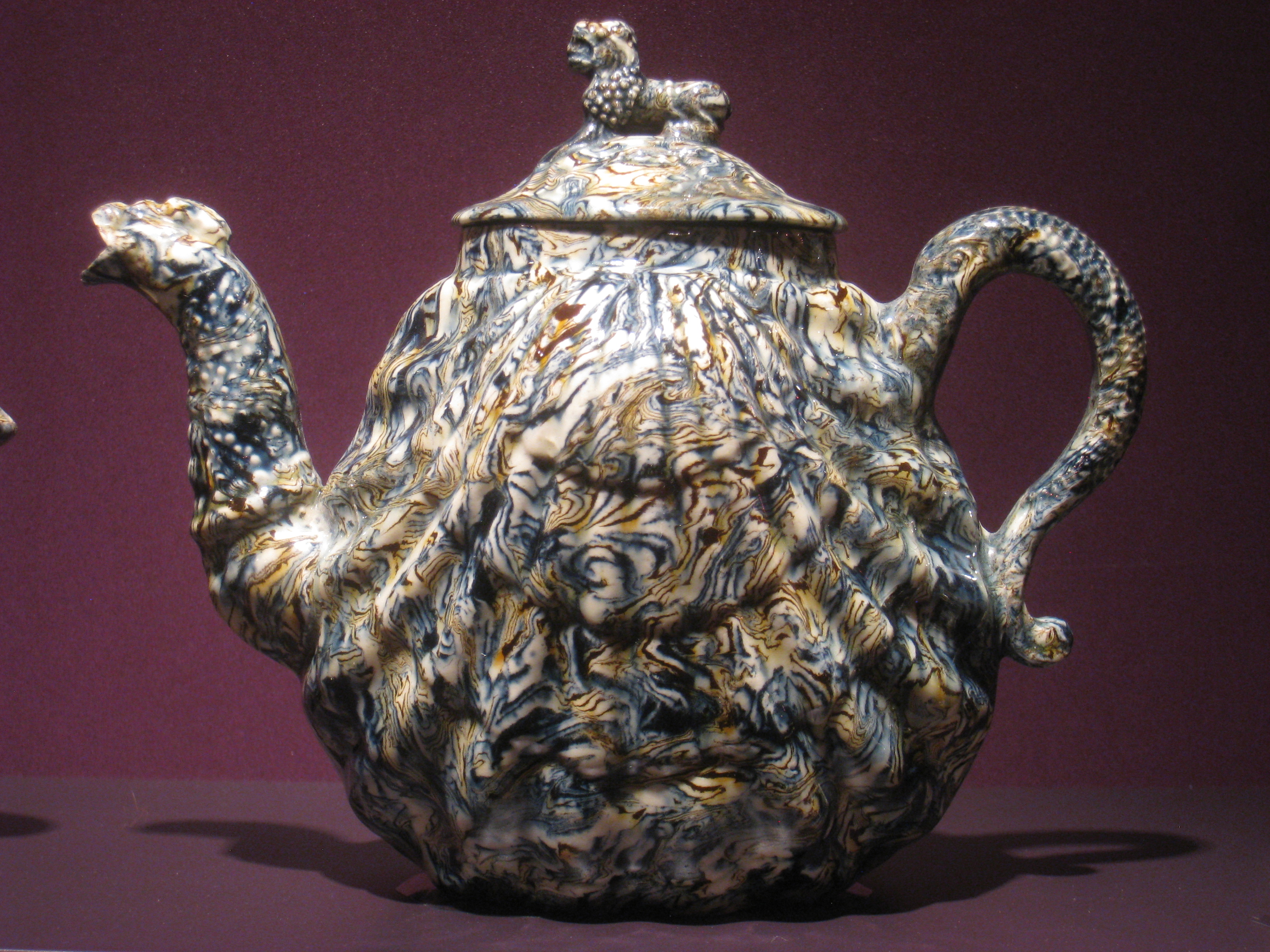
Agateware teapot, Staffordshire, 1745-1750

== Technique ==
In order to avoid cracking and breaking which come along with mixing a variety of different kinds of clay, potters generally use one white or very light clay as a base. They then add colors in the form of stains or oxides. Colorant is added to the clay when it is in powder form in order to avoid blistering. 1–10% of colorant is generally applied, however it is up to the individual taste of the potter. The drying process is the most crucial part of this technique.

In Japan it is called nerikomi.
