= Anthem Veterans Memorial =

Monument in Anthem, Maricopa County, Arizona, US

Coordinates: 33°51′47.93″N 112°8′12.20″W

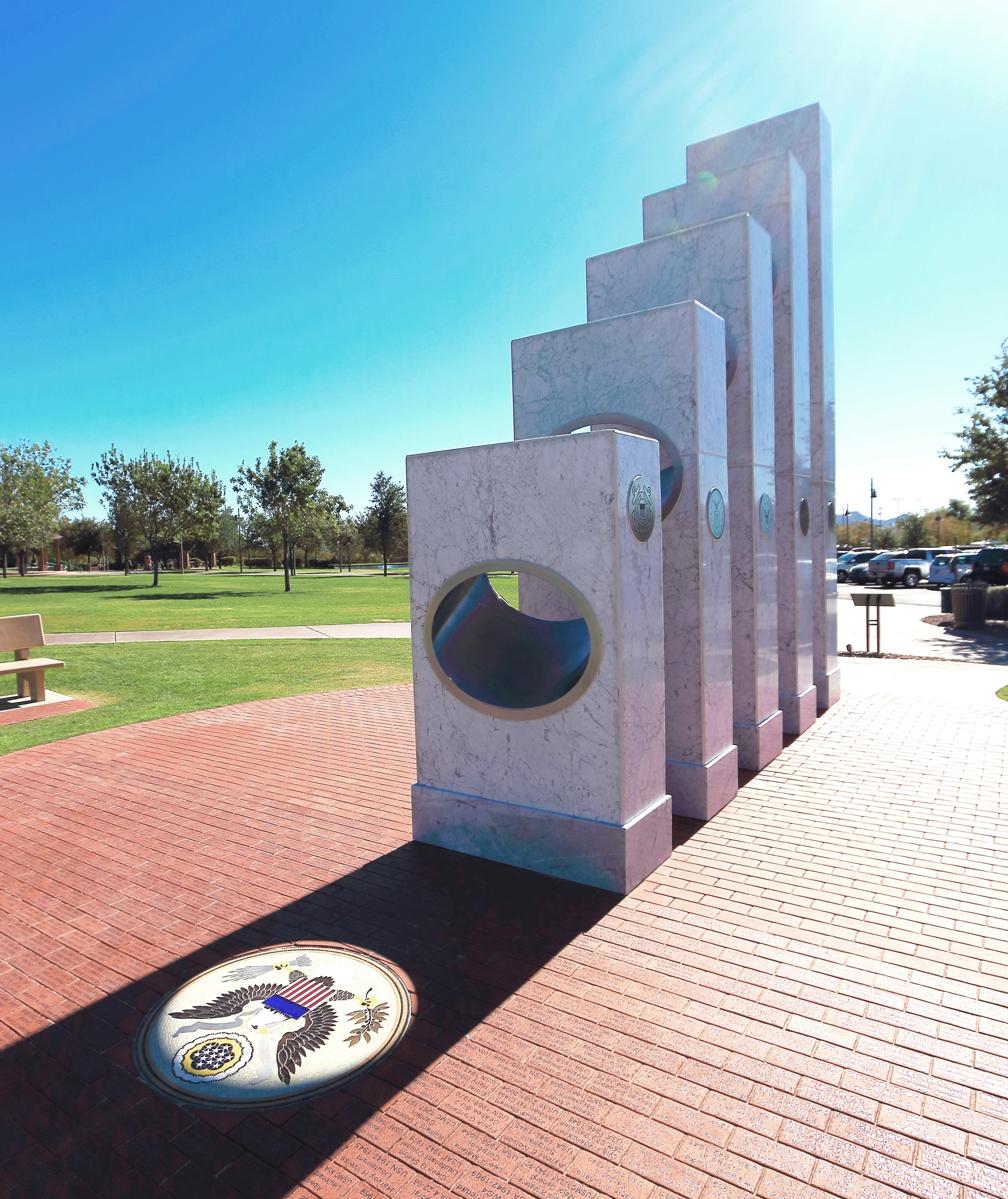
The Anthem Veterans Memorial

The Anthem Veterans Memorial is a monument located in Anthem, Arizona which was dedicated in 2011 to honor the sacrifice and service made by members of the United States Armed Forces.

The memorial's five white pillars represent the nation's military branches and are arranged in Department of Defense order of precedence: Army, Marine Corps, Navy, Air Force, and Coast Guard. Each pillar has an elliptical opening that slants downward toward the Great Seal of the United States. On Veterans Day – November 11 – the design allows the sun's rays to spotlight the Great Seal at 11:11 am Mountain Standard Time. The design goal was 11:11:11 am, but the variations each year cause the precise alignment over the next 100 years to be between 11:10:58 and 11:11:22.

Due to the leap years discrepancy between the official and astronomical calendar the effect can be observed at least one day before or after Veterans Day as well.

The monument is surrounded by 2,200 red paving stones engraved with the names of veterans. The red stones, the white pillars and the blue Arizona sky represent the colors in the flag of the United States.

Renee Palmer-Jones created the design for the memorial. The engineer for the memorial was James Martin.

== Awards ==
Awards include:

- Arizona Historic Landmark Designation 2012 – Arizona Historical Society
- Arizona Public Works Project of the Year Award 2012 – Arizona Chapter of the American Public Works Association (APWA)
- ACEC 2012 Grand Award – Best Engineering and Environmental Consulting Project – American Consulting Engineers Companies
