= Anthem Christmas tree =

Christmas tree in Arizona, US

Coordinates: 33.8746°N 112.149°W

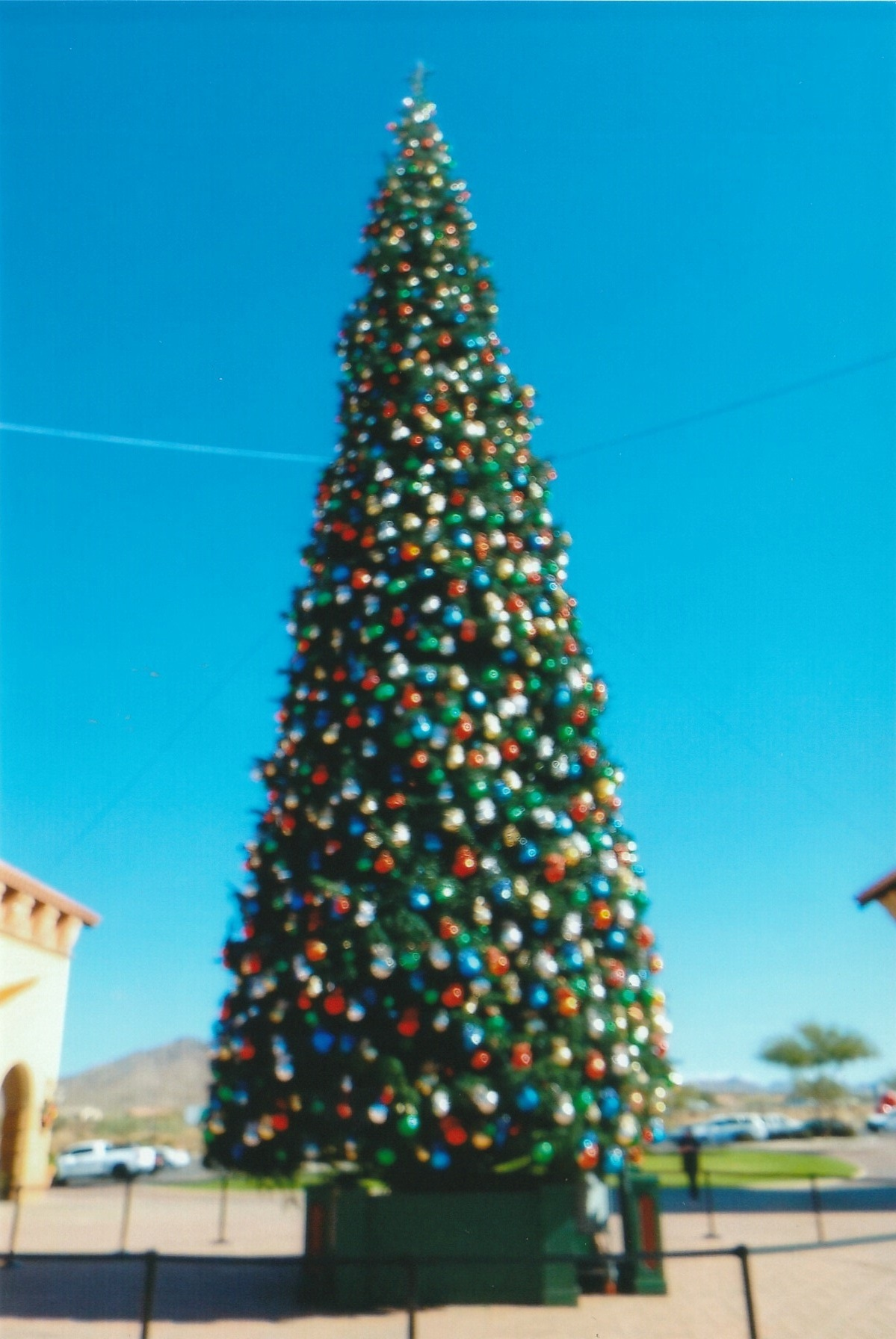
2017 Anthem Christmas tree

The Anthem Christmas tree is a Christmas tree erected annually at the Outlets North Phoenix, an outlet mall in Anthem, Arizona, approximately 30 mi (48 km) north of downtown Phoenix. The mall's tree is the tallest Christmas tree in the state of Arizona every year, and is often listed as the tallest Christmas tree in the United States.

== Background ==
The mall has been displaying a tall tree since 2002. At some point during the 2000s, the tree began setting the record for Arizona's tallest fresh-cut Christmas tree, with heights exceeding 80 ft (24 m). In 2010, a 110-foot-tall (34 m) white pine was installed, giving the Anthem tree its first title of tallest fresh-cut Christmas tree in the United States. The marketing director at the mall said in 2012 that the tree draws customers from around the state as well as brings national attention.

== Origin and installation ==
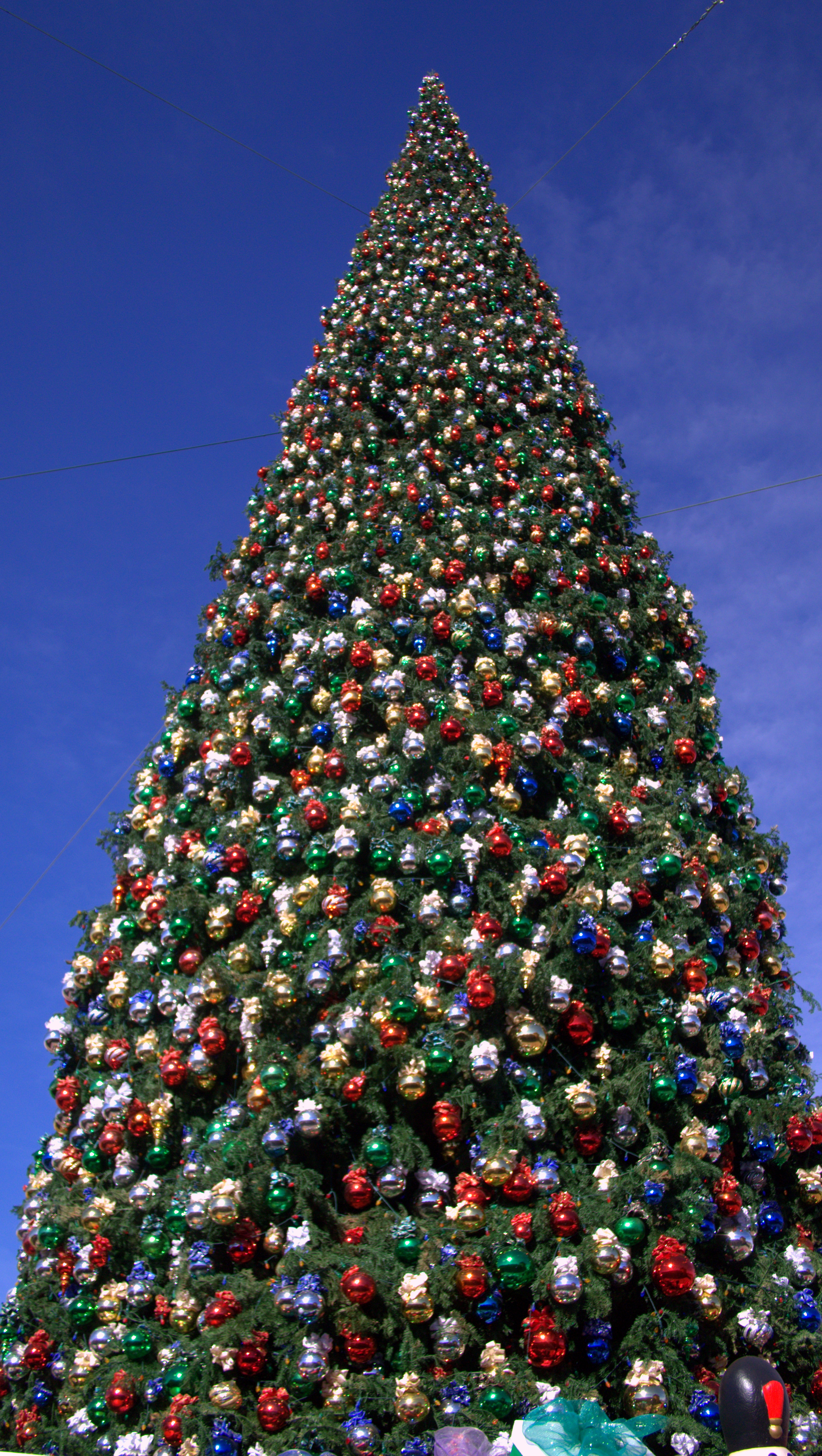
2014 Anthem Christmas tree

The tree is harvested annually near McCloud, in the Shasta–Trinity National Forest in northern California, from a family-run tree farm. These pine trees do not naturally have live branches on the bottom portion due to the lack of sunlight reaching the ground, therefore the tree does not have the triangular shape of a traditional Christmas tree. The bottom portion of the trunk is shaped with the addition of small trees of the same species, which are used to make artificial branches. These "branches" are attached to the trunk by being grafted into cut notches, filling in the lower part of the tree and creating a more pleasing aesthetic look. Up to 1,000 live branches are used, ranging from 3 to 13 ft (0.91 to 3.96 m) in length, to give the tree its final shape.

In 2018, 25 saplings were planted to replenish the area from which the tree was harvested. About fifty pine cones from the 2014 tree were used to replant other trees. In some years, there is a "twin" of similar size at the mall's "sister" property, Citadel Outlets in Los Angeles, California.

A trucking company that specializes in heavy or oversize loads then hauls the tree approximately 750 mi (1,210 km) over four days on an extended length semi-trailer. The tree travels south through Shasta, Sacramento, and Los Angeles before heading into the desert and across the Arizona border on an open flatbed trailer with a banner that reads "Follow me to Outlets at Anthem Largest Tree in Arizona".

Upon arriving in Anthem, the tree is placed in a seven ft (2.1 m) well filled with water that keeps the tree from drying out until January. It is also sprayed with over 200 US gal (760 L; 170 imp gal) of fire retardant.

== Lighting ceremony ==
A crew of ten to twelve people working eight-hour days for several weeks decorate the tree with 5,000 ornaments and bows, and 80 strands of LED Christmas lights that cumulatively measure 1.5 miles (2.4 km) in length. The ornaments measure 4 to 18 in (100 to 460 mm) and the tree is topped with a 3-foot (0.91 m), 15 lb (6.8 kg) copper star. The copper star represents Arizona's copper heritage, as the state has mined more copper than any other state since 1907 and was nicknamed "The Copper State" at statehood in 1912.

The installation and decoration begins in late October and a tree-lighting ceremony is held in mid-November. The ceremony includes live music and "holiday treats" at the "family fun night", the highlight of which is the illumination of the tree for the first time. The live entertainment in 2018 included performances by AJ Mitchell and the All-American Boys Chorus from Los Angeles. Country singer Maggie Rose performed in 2015.

The 2019 display includes an interactive light show in which lights on the tree and on the roofline of surrounding buildings are synchronized to music. The nine-minute light show is repeated hourly each night through Christmas Eve.

== Tallest tree ==
The tallest tree in the country in the 1970s and 1980s was at the National Enquirer offices in Palm Beach, Florida, and reached almost 120 ft (37 m) in 1979 when the Guinness Book of World Records listed it as the "World's Largest Decorated Christmas Tree". The Enquirer stopped displaying tall trees after owner Generoso Pope died in 1988.

The Rockefeller Center Christmas Tree in Manhattan, New York, a Norway spruce, varies yearly from 65 to 100 ft (20 to 30 m) or more. It has likely been the tallest tree in the nation at times since 1988. From 2010 to 2016, the Anthem tree has been 110 to 115 ft (34 to 35 m) and is often listed as the tallest tree in the United States, including in 2010, 2012, 2013, 2014, 2015, and 2016. In 2015, USA Today ran a Christmas graphic showing the Anthem tree as the nation's tallest at 115 ft (35 m), with the Rockefeller Center tree at 78 ft (24 m). In 2017, 2018, and 2019, the tree was reported as 80 ft (24 m) and called Arizona's tallest.

== Statistics ==
Year	Height (Note: Heights are approximate as sources are not clear if reported height is as cut or after installation; the two can vary by several feet.)	Width	Weight (Note: Installed weight with all ornamentation.)	Notes
2020	70 ft (21 m)	20 ft (6.1 m)	8,000 lb (3,600 kg)	
2019	80 ft (24 m)	20 ft (6.1 m)		
2018	80 ft (24 m)	22 ft (6.7 m)	9,000 lb (4,100 kg)	
2017	80 ft (24 m)			
2016	115 ft (35 m)			
2015	115 ft (35 m)			
2014	115 ft (35 m)	17 ft (5.2 m)	32,000 lb (15,000 kg)	
2013	115 ft (35 m)	27 ft (8.2 m)	32,000 lb (15,000 kg)	
2012	110 ft (34 m)			
2011	114 ft (35 m)			
2010	110 ft (34 m)	27 ft (8.2 m)	24,000 lb (11,000 kg)	

== See also ==
- List of individual trees
