= Ralph Avery =

American painter

- Born: 1906; Savannah, Georgia
- Died: 1976 (aged 69–70); Rochester, New York
- Known for: Painter

Ralph Avery (1906–1976) was an American landscape painter and watercolorist based in Rochester, New York. He recorded city streets, churches, trees, iron fences, and the ambiance of Rochester, New York. He also painted in Mexico, the West Indies, Europe, and Northern Africa.

== Early life ==
Avery painted since his childhood. Born in Savannah, Georgia, Avery attended boarding school at Blair Academy in NJ, where he established himself as the school's preeminent artist. After graduating from Blair in 1925, Avery moved to Rochester to study at Rochester Institute of Technology (Athenaeum, and Mechanics Institute), earning his degree in 1928. From 1930 to 1931, Avery studied at Louis C. Tiffany Foundation, Oyster Bay on a scholarship. He studied with Charles Woodbury, Harry Leith-Ross, and Carl Peters, among others. Avery taught in the Department of Applied Art at RIT for twenty-five years. By the time of his death in 1976, Avery had become one of the most identifiable and popular painters in Rochester.

== Style of work ==
He mainly painted scenes from Rochester and the Corn Hill area including: gray-foggy views of the skyline, portraits of elegant old city homes and abstractions of natural areas. Ralph Avery claims his work was heavily influenced by Japanese artists with simple, flat, decorative patterns and strong designs. A friend of his, John Menihan stated, "Avery's total work did much to eliminate the line between commercial and fine art...he was so good he would win a prize in any company."

== Rochester ==
When Avery first came to this region, he entered a Finger Lakes competition and was voted "most popular" and became the first recipient of the Rumrill-Hoyt Award. Ralph Avery's paintings were mainly of Rochester and the Corn Hill area. There is a section of Corn Hill dedicated in his memory called the Ralph Avery Mall. This mall is a tribute to Avery's illustrations and paintings done in the Rochester area. Ralph Avery found beauty in Rochester's dreary weather that most people complain about. To him, there was something beautiful about Rochester rain and snow. A close friend, Mrs. Vera Fogg, described Avery when she said, "He saw beauty in the city all the time." He appeared in The Saturday Evening Post. Avery's artwork appeared on the cover of Reader's Digest fourteen times.

Ralph Avery resided at the Daughters of the American Revolution house on Livingston Park, and his studio was located at 60 North Fitzhugh Street in Rochester,

== Famous works of art ==
The Statue of Mercury, messenger of god's and the highlight of Rochester, New York's city skyline though Avery's eyes, is one of his most well-known works. Avery's paintings appeared on many greeting card covers, calendars, and, as mentioned before, the cover of Reader's Digest. The Bevier Gallery at Rochester Institute of Technology holds pieces from Avery's collection. On December 4 to December 18 of 1976; 75 of his paintings were on display in this gallery in celebration of his life.

Avery's estate gave the Memorial Art Gallery (Rochester) over 450 pieces of his collection. The collection includes sketches of how he came about some paintings, as well as tracings from photographs, among various styles of work.

== Honors and awards ==
1954 - Pratt Purchase Prize 1954 - One-man exhibits at Smithsonian and National Collection of Fine Arts 1957 - Grumbacher Purchase Prize 1957 - Rudolf Lesch Fine Arts Purchase Prize 1960 - Named Fellow of Rochester Museum and Science Center 1967 - Outstanding Alumnus at Rochester Institute of Technology Lilian Fairchild Award of University of Rochester 1976 – Arnot Art Gallery, Elmira, New York 1980 – Memorial Art Gallery, Rochester, New York

In September 1954, Avery's Plymouth Avenue Rain was displayed in America's Top 40. His piece was chosen by the American Watercolor Society to be displayed in this show.

== Affiliations with organizations ==
- Rochester Art Club
  - Served as president from 1935 to 1938
- Print Club of Rochester
  - Served as president from 1935 to 1936 and on the board of directors from 1936 to 1939.
- American Watercolor Society
- Associate member of the National Academy of Design

Credit: Rochester Institute of Technology His work can be found in the collections at the Memorial Art Gallery, the Newark Public Library, the Rochester Public Library, and the Bevier Collection at Rochester Institute of Technology.
