= David Egan (soccer) =

American soccer player

David J. Egan
Personal information
- Place of birth: Pittsburgh, Pennsylvania, U.S.
- Position: Defender

Youth career
- 1975–1977: Yale Bulldogs

Senior career*
| Years | Team | Apps | (Gls) |
| 1978 | New England Tea Men | 0 | (0) |
| 1978–1979 | Pittsburgh Spirit (indoor) | 23 | (1) |
- * Club domestic league appearances and goals

David Egan is an American retired soccer player. He played professionally in the North American Soccer League and Major Indoor Soccer League.

Egan attended Yale University, playing on the men's soccer team from 1975 to 1977. On May 5, 1978, the New England Tea Men of the North American Soccer League signed Egan. The Tea Men released Egan on December 23, 1978. Egan then signed with the Pittsburgh Spirit of the Major Indoor Soccer League.
