= Dorothy Feibleman =

Dorothy Feibleman is an American ceramics artist specializing in nerikomi porcelain.

== Early life and education ==
Feibleman was born in Indianapolis, Indiana, in 1951. She received a BFA in ceramics from the Rochester Institute of Technology in 1973.

== Career ==
Feibleman moved to England to set up a ceramics studio in 1973. She specializes in white and translucent nerikomi porcelain.

She was artist-in-residence at the John Michael Kohler Arts Center in 1996.

Works by Feibleman are held in the collections of the Metropolitan Museum of Art, the Indianapolis Museum of Art at Newfields, the Ulster Museum, the Victoria and Albert Museum, the Stuttgart Museum, Hungary's International Ceramic Studio Museum, and Japan's Museum of Contemporary Ceramics.

She has taught or given lectures or demonstrations in China, Japan, the UK and the US. In 2011 she appeared on season 4 of Begin Japanology. In 2020 she appeared as a guest judge on the third season of Great Pottery Throwdown.

== Personal life ==
Feibleman lives in England.
