= Craig Varjabedian =

American fine-art photographer (born 1957)

- Born: September 26, 1957 (age 69); Windsor, Ontario
- Occupation: Photographer

Craig Varjabedian (born September 26, 1957, in Windsor, Ontario) is a fine-art photographer who explores the back roads of the American West, making pictures of the unique and quintessential. He shares stories of the land and the people who live on it, one photograph at a time. Moving from Canada to the United States in 1970, he currently lives in Santa Fe, New Mexico.

== Biography ==
Craig studied with the late Phil Davis at the University of Michigan and Paul Caponigro in Santa Fe. He received a BFA in Fine Arts from the University of Michigan, and an MFA in Photography from the Rochester Institute of Technology. Craig's first major one-person exhibition was at the Albuquerque Museum in 1994. Since that time he has been widely exhibited in museums and galleries throughout the United States and has received grants from the National Endowment for the Arts, the Samuel H. Kress Foundation and the McCune Charitable Foundation. He is the author of twelve books. His seven-year project documenting the moradas of the Penitente Brotherhood in New Mexico is archived at the DeGolyer Library, Southern Methodist University, Dallas, Texas.

His current project, the Native Light Collaboration, is a collaborative portrait project celebrating the lives and cultures of Native Americans. Throughout the American West, Varjabedian chronicles the personal identities of Native Americans – illuminating their individuality, culture, and resilience through authentic photographic portraits.

He is also the Director of The Eloquent Light Photography Workshops in Santa Fe, New Mexico. Offering workshops since 1986, he offers private and small-group photography workshops featuring unique people and inspiring places found off the beaten path.

In the words of noted photography historian Beaumont Newhall, "The remarkable photographs by Craig Varjabedian are not only beautiful but also extremely valuable documents of architecture, culture, and lifestyle of Northern New Mexico. His work is extremely valuable from both artistic and historical viewpoints."

== Published works ==
- The Gifts of Fleeting Grace. Santa Fe: Craig Varjabedian Photography, 2021.
- Light of the Great Mystery. Eloquent Light Editions, 2017. ISBN 978-0-9996-7320-1 Revised edition, 2021. ISBN 978-0-9996-7322-5
- The Light of Days Gone By. Eloquent Light Editions, 2020. ISBN 978-0-9996-7321-8
- Into the Great White Sands. University of New Mexico Press, 2018. ISBN 978-0-8263-5830-1
- The Alchemy of Light. Eloquent Light Editions, 2018.
- The Light of Days Gone By. Eloquent Light Editions, 2020. ISBN 978-0-9996-7321-8
- Landscape Dreams, A New Mexico Portrait. University of New Mexico Press, 2012. ISBN 978-0-8263-4879-1
- The Eloquence of Trees. With essay by Jaima Chevalier. Limited Edition, Athenon and PhotoBook Press, 2010.
- Ghost Ranch and the Faraway Nearby. University of New Mexico Press, 2009. ISBN 978-0-8263-3621-7
- Four and Twenty Photographs: Stories from Behind the Lens. University of New Mexico Press, 2007. ISBN 978-0-8263-4094-8
- By the Grace of Light: Images of Faith from Catholic New Mexico. With essays by the Most Reverend Michael J. Sheehan, Archbishop of Santa Fe, Mag Dimond, and Cathy Wright. Colorado Springs: Colorado Springs Fine Arts Center, 1998.
- As the Spirit Stands Still. Photographs by Craig Varjabedian with essay by Gussie Fauntleroy. Limited edition, hardbound with slipcase. Santa Fe, NM: Cirrus Editions Limited, 1998.
- En Divina Luz: The Penitente Moradas of New Mexico. With essay by Michael Wallis. Albuquerque: The University of New Mexico Press, 1994. ISBN 978-0-8263-1547-2
- Waiting for The Light column in online magazine Double Exposure
