= David Spindel =

American photographer (born 1941)

David M. Spindel
- Born: David Michael Spindel; August 31, 1941 (age 84); Brooklyn, New York, United States
- Education: Rochester Institute of Technology
- Website: http://www.spindelvisions.com

David Michael Spindel (born August 31, 1941) is an American photographer. He began his professional career in 1964, working with still-life objects, and eventually broadened his horizons by doing portraits. Spindel also incorporates baseball memorabilia in collage form in some of his work. He is probably best known for photographing John Lennon and Yoko Ono during Lennon's last recording sessions for Double Fantasy in 1980.

== Biography ==
Spindel grew up in the Flatbush section of Brooklyn, New York. He graduated from Rochester Institute of Technology in 1964 (studying under such photographers as Minor White, professor Leslie Stroebel, Richard D. Zakia, Ralph Hattersley, and Robert Bagby). He worked as a photo assistant for six years until his employer at that time, Tosh Matsumoto, encouraged him to open his own studio.

Throughout his commercial career, Spindel was featured in major newspapers, magazines and art publications. Television shows in the U.S. and abroad have featured segments on his approach to photography.

After 28 years in commercial advertising, Spindel began creating an interactive body of work called "Rebuses." Webster’s dictionary defines a rebus as representation of words or phrases by means of pictures or objects whose names resemble those words or phrases; a form of riddle composed of such pictures. Spindel's rebuses have been quoted as being "unexpectedly different and more fun than finding one of Hirshfeld’s Ninas". Ranging in subjects from all-time favorite celebrities to frequently used everyday expressions, Spindel's rebuses are an outpouring of his sense of humor.

Notable fans and collectors of Spindel's work include: Charlton Heston, Hillary Clinton, Dr. Ruth Westheimer (Dr. Ruth), Marty Allen, Stiller and Meara, Anne Jackson, Eli Wallach, Chuck Connors, Donald Trump, Jerry Lewis, Lou Jacobi, Billy Crystal and Kate Hepburn. Regis Philbin said, “David is a little eccentric but you have to put up with it when someone is a genius”. Bette Davis once said, “David’s art is wondrous”. Michael Eisner thought his photography was extraordinary and recommended it to the sports division of Disney. Joe DiMaggio greatly admired Spindel’s talent and posed for a portrait with his own personal memorabilia.

In 1992, Abbeville Press released The Bronx Bombers and The Boston Red Sox, the first two titles in the award-winning, eight-volume Major League Memories series. Each book chronicles a major league baseball team’s history, in scrapbook form, from inception to present day.

In 2014 Master PIece puzzle commissioned him to create one of his collages on the life of John Wayne. It is titled "Remembering the Duke". They also licensed 4 of his sports images for 1000 piece puzzles.

On the eve of John Lennon's birthday in 2015, CNN licensed several of his photographs for a special documentary they were creating.

Spindel is also known for donating his photographs to charitable organizations. He has raised funds for the Leukemia Society of America, the Mid-Hudson Children’s Museum, A.L.S., Baseball Assistance Team (BAT), lupus, The Heart Fund, Yogi Berra’s and Phil Rizzuto’s favorite charities (Handicapped Boy Scouts of Southern NJ and St. Joseph’s School for the Blind), and numerous family shelters.

Spindel's original photographs created for posters are featured at The National Baseball Hall of Fame.

He now resides in Anthem, Arizona.
