= Nerikomi =

Japanese pottery term

Nerikomi (練り込み, lit. 'kneading') is a Japanese pottery term describing the artistic technique where multiple colors of clay are marbled or combined to create various designs. The technique can also be called neriage (練上げ), although this more commonly refers to throwing multiple colors of clay on a wheel.

== History ==
Nerikomi is a contemporary Japanese term. Marbling ceramic techniques were first found used in Egypt and China and through the Romans to the West. Early ceramics in Stoke-on-Trent use more than one colour of clay for decorative effect. In England this was referred to as agateware.

In Japan there are a few pieces from the Momoyama period (1568–1600), and Edo period (1603–1868), as well as extant pieces of mingei, that display marbled ceramics. There was an explosion in popularity of the technique from about 1978–1995 in Japan, due probably to Aida Yusuke's advertising and to Matsui Kousei, who refers to his work as neriage.

The term started being used in the 1970s to describe related kanji neriage. Yusuke Aida was on a television commercial for Nescafé and it seems to have entered the vocabulary at about that time when his nerikomi coffee cups were available to the first people contacting the advertisers.

It was used in the Tang dynasty in 7th-century China there are at least two Chinese characters to describe variations of this technique (one surface, one structural).

== Technique ==
In nerikomi, a design is created in such a way that it extends through a long block of clay, akin to the murrine canes of millefiori glasswork. By slicing thin slabs of the block, the design can be repeated, to either be reassembled in repetition or applied to a larger piece.

== See also ==
- Japanese pottery
