= North Valley Christian Academy =

Private school in Phoenix, Arizona, US

Location
- 33655 N. 27th Drive; Phoenix, Arizona 85085; United States; 33.8666°N 112.1465°W

Information
- Type: Private Christian School
- Religious affiliation: Lutheran Church - Missouri Synod (LCMS)
- Denomination: Lutheran Church – Missouri Synod
- Established: 2005; 21 years ago
- Grades: Preschool - 12
- Nursery years taught: 2 years through Kindergarten
- Enrollment: 740
- Head of School: Chris Schoenleb
- Website: northvalleyca.org

The North Valley Christian Academy (NVCA) is a private, Christian school in north Phoenix, Arizona, serving students from preschool through 12th grade.

NVCA is affiliated with the Lutheran Church – Missouri Synod (LCMS). The academy is accredited by National Lutheran School Accreditation (NLSA), Association of Christian Schools International (ACSI), and Cognia.

NVCA operates a preschool, lower school, middle school, high school, and international student program.

== History ==
Originally affiliated with Cross of Christ Lutheran Church in Anthem, Arizona, North Valley Christian Academy (NVCA) began as Cross of Christ Christian School, opening its doors in August 2005. In 2010, ties were severed with Cross of Christ, and NVCA emerged as an independent, self-owned and operated Lutheran school in affiliation with the LCMS system for schools throughout the United States.

NVCA relocated from the church campus to temporary facilities in 2013. After several years of fundraising, NVCA purchased two parcels of land located just south of Anthem. On September 19, 2016, NVCA broke ground on the south parcel, and construction of its current facilities began. The north parcel was held and reserved for future development, with plans of expansion to include an early childhood development center at a later date. NVCA opened its newly constructed campus on August 16, 2017. In 2024, NVCA opened a 13,000-square-foot (1,200 m^{2}) high school building on the same campus. The building holds a dual purpose black box theater and lecture hall that serves as two classrooms.

Nate Kretzmann was the founding Executive Director, serving from 2010 to 2018. Chris Schoeleb was hired in 2018 to be the next Head of School. NVCA is a 501(c)(3), non-profit, education organization. The school is operated and governed independently by an elected board of directors.

== Extracurricular activities ==
=== Athletics ===
NVCA's high school competes in Division 2A of the Arizona Interscholastic Association (AIA)

- Fall sports: Cross Country, Girls Volleyball, Soccer, Spirit Line
- Winter sports: basketball, Sprit Line, Pom
- Spring sports: baseball, golf, track, beach volleyball, girls softball

=== State championships ===
Men's basketball

2021, 2023,

Spirit Line

2024
