= 9rules =

Weblog Network

- Website type: Blog network
- Owners: Paul Scrivens, Mike Rundle, Tyme White
- Creators: Paul Scrivens, Mike Rundle, Matthew Oliphant, Colin Devroe
- Website: 9rules.com
- Commercial: Yes

9rules is a blog network that serves as an online community of blogs and bloggers. In 2006 it took the award for Best Community Site of the Year at SXSWi in Austin, Texas.

9rules is currently made up of over 30 communities divided by topics such as Gaming, Apple, Web Design and Web 2.0. Each member is hand-picked out of thousands that apply to join, their blogs evaluated over an extended period of time with regard to quality. In 2006 it is estimated to have had more than 200 members.

== Membership process ==
From 2005 to 2006 applications were handled in submission rounds, occurring roughly twice a year and giving applicants a 24-hour window to submit their blog. Each member was evaluated and hand-picked by the site staff based on quality of applicants' blogs. The fifth membership round attracted 1,190 new submissions. In 2007 a new application round started but was not limited by the previous 24-hour time limit. 9rules remained open for submissions until April 17, 2007, when the round was officially closed with a public announcement.

In September 2009, 9rules was acquired by Splashpress Media. Since then they have announced the 9th round of submissions.

== Membership rounds in 2008 ==
The latest version of the 9rules website now includes pre-announced dates for membership rounds in 2008. The first membership round—Round 6—yielded over 50 new sites however 9rules did not publicize how many blogs submitted.

== Site history ==
=== Ali ===
On February 8, 2007, 9rules launched a new version of its site code-named Ali.

=== Ali2 ===
On October 9, 2007, 9rules launched a new version of its site code-named Ali2 which introduced several new features to their public member forums. This included a visual redesign, social bookmarking system and improved capabilities for user profiles to showcase feeds from external sites such as Flickr, Del.icio.us and Twitter.

=== Chawlk ===
On February 22, 2008, it was announced that 9rules would change its approach again. 9rules proper will only feature member content, as it did before Ali, whereas the community will transfer to a new site set up by the owners, called Chawlk.
