= David Egan (judge) =

American judge

David D. Egan is an American judge who served as a state Supreme Court justice for the Seventh Judicial District of New York from 2000 to 2011.

== Early life and education ==
Egan graduated from Spencerport High School in 1957. He then attended the Rochester Institute of Technology (RIT) where he competed on the wrestling team. Egan took a break from college to serve in the United States Coast Guard Reserve and afterwards returned to RIT. During his senior year, he was the wrestling team captain, won a silver medal at Niagara District AAU Olympic Freestyle Tournament and was awarded Outstanding Wrestler of the Year at RIT. Egan earned a Bachelor's Degree in Business in 1962. In 2001, Egan was inducted into the Rochester Institute of Technology Sports Hall of Fame. Egan earned a Juris Doctor from the Albany Law School.

== Career ==
Following law school, Egan worked as a lawyer in private practice for 16 years. In 1976, Egan ran for election as the Republican Party and Conservative Party nominee for New York's 133rd State Assembly district. Egan lost to the incumbent Democrat. In 1980, Egan was elected as a municipal judge in Gates, New York and served from 1980 to 1983. In 1983, he was elected to the Monroe County Court and served until 2000. He retired from the bench on April 2, 2011, after 31 years. Egan was appointed to the state Supreme Court by Governor George Pataki in 2000. He retired from the bench on April 2, 2011, after 31 years.
