= The Log from the Sea of Cortez =

Book by John Steinbeck

- First edition
- Author: John Steinbeck
- Language: English
- Publisher: The Viking Press
- Publication date: 1951
- Publication place: United States
- Pages: 288

The Log from the Sea of Cortez is an English-language book written by American author John Steinbeck and published in 1951. It details a six-week (March 11 – April 20) marine specimen-collecting boat expedition he made in 1940 at various sites in the Gulf of California (also known as the Sea of Cortez), with his friend, the marine biologist Ed Ricketts. It is regarded as one of Steinbeck's most important works of non-fiction chiefly because of the involvement of Ricketts, who shaped Steinbeck's thinking and provided the prototype for many of the pivotal characters in his fiction, and the insights it gives into the philosophies of the two men.

The Log from the Sea of Cortez is the narrative portion of an earlier work, Sea of Cortez: A Leisurely Journal of Travel and Research, which was published by Steinbeck and Ricketts shortly after their return from the Gulf of California, and combined the journals of the collecting expedition, reworked by Steinbeck, with Ricketts' species catalogue. After Ricketts' death in 1948, Steinbeck dropped the species catalogue from the earlier work and republished it with a eulogy to his friend added as a foreword.

== Journey ==
=== Background ===
Steinbeck met Ricketts in 1930 through a shared interest in marine biology. Ricketts made a modest living as a professional biologist by preparing and selling specimens of intertidal fauna to laboratories and universities from his small lab in Cannery Row, and Steinbeck spent many hours at the lab in Ricketts' company. Ricketts was the inspiration for the boozy, good-hearted character of "Doc", who appeared in the novels set in and around Monterey, and elements of his personality are mirrored by many other important characters in Steinbeck's novels.

Both Steinbeck and Ricketts had achieved some measure of security and recognition in their professions by 1939: Steinbeck had capitalized on his first successful novel, Tortilla Flat, with the publication of The Grapes of Wrath, and Ricketts had published Between Pacific Tides, which became the definitive handbook for the study of the intertidal fauna of the Pacific Coast of the coterminous United States. Steinbeck was exhausted and looking for a new start; Ricketts was looking for a new challenge. The two men had long thought of producing a book together and, in a change of pace for both of them, they began work on a handbook of the common intertidal species of the San Francisco Bay Area. The book came to nothing, but it spurred them into making a trip to the Sea of Cortez. Initially they planned a motoring trip to Mexico City as a break from their work on the handbook, but as time went on they became more interested in a collecting trip around the Gulf of California. Ricketts noted in his journal:

Jon said, "If you have an objective, like collecting specimens, it puts so much more direction onto a trip, makes it more interesting."...Then he said, "We'll do a book about it that'll more than pay the expenses of the trip."

A specimen-collecting expedition along the Pacific Coast and down into Mexico provided them with a chance to relax, and, for Steinbeck, a chance for a brief escape from the controversy mounting over The Grapes of Wrath. Ricketts, suffering as a result of the breakup of his long-term relationship with a married woman in Monterey, was glad to get away too. They planned to collect specimens from the rock and tide pools and the shore line uncovered between tides, which would allow them to build up a picture of the macro level ecosystem in the Gulf. The preserved specimens of the fauna they collected could be identified and catalogued or sold on their return.

Early in 1940, Steinbeck and Ricketts hired a Monterey Bay sardine fishing boat, the Western Flyer, with a four-man crew, and spent six weeks travelling the coast of the Gulf of California collecting biological specimens. Along with Ricketts and the four crew members mentioned in the book, Steinbeck was accompanied by his wife, Carol. Steinbeck hoped that the trip would help rescue their failing marriage, but it seems to have had the opposite effect: the marriage ended soon after they returned. Steinbeck's lawyer and friend, Toby Street, was also on board as far as San Diego.

=== Account of the expedition ===
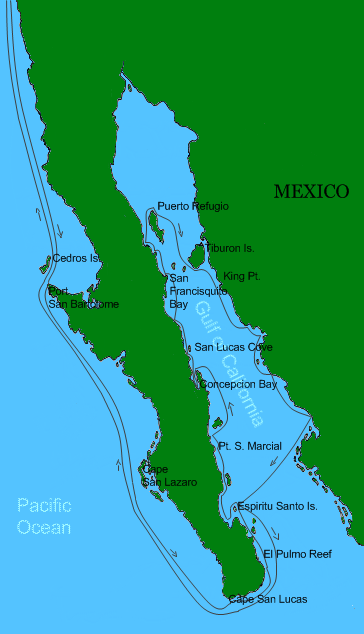
The route around the Gulf of California taken by the Western Flyer

The Western Flyer is a 75-foot (23 m) purse seiner, that was crewed by Tony Berry, the captain; "Tex" Travis, the engineer; and two able seamen, "Sparky" Enea and "Tiny" Colletto.^{[a]} Stocked with supplies, collecting equipment and a small library, the boat put out to sea on the afternoon of March 11, 1940.^{[b]} They started in a leisurely fashion down the Pacific coast, fishing as they went. They refueled at San Diego and on March 17 passed Point San Lazaro and made their way down the Pacific side of the Baja California peninsula. They put in at Cabo San Lucas, on the tip of the peninsula, where they were greeted by Mexican officials and began collecting specimens. The collecting team was initially planned to consist of Steinbeck and Ricketts alone, but Carol and eventually Enea and Colletto joined them, allowing for a much more efficient collection at each stop.

The battles with their outboard motor, referred to pseudonymously as the "Hansen Sea-Cow", which would feature as a humorous thread throughout the journal, began immediately and continued the next day when they moved further round the coast to El Pulmo Reef:

Our Hansen Sea-Cow was not only a living thing but a mean, irritable, contemptible, vengeful, mischievous, hateful living thing.... [it] loved to ride on the back of a boat, trailing its propeller daintily in the water while we rowed... when attacked with a screwdriver [it] fell apart in simulated death... It loved no one, trusted no one, it had no friends.

Making for Isla Espiritu Santo they faced strong winds and, rather than attempting to land at the island, they anchored at Pescadero on the mainland. On March 20 they returned to the island and spent the day collecting. A visit from some natives of La Paz that evening, coupled with the exhaustion of their supplies of beer, encouraged them to make for the town the next morning. They spent three days collecting with the assistance of the locals, and enjoyed the hospitality of La Paz. In writing about the town, Steinbeck briefly recounts the story that he would later rewrite as The Pearl.

On March 23, they moved on to San José Island, where the "Sea-Cow" again let them down: they wanted it to bring the boat close to Cayo islet, but they ended up rowing the boat, with the outboard still attached, after it failed to start. The next day, Easter Sunday, they continued on to Marcial Reef. After collecting specimens there, they sailed to Puerto Escondido where they met some holidaying Mexicans who invited them on a hunting trip. They accepted, wanting to see the interior of the peninsula, and enjoyed two days in the company of the Mexicans, eating, drinking and listening to unintelligible dirty jokes in Spanish. Due to the relaxed attitudes of their hosts, no actual hunting took place, which pleased Steinbeck:

Furthermore, they had taught us the best of all ways to go hunting, and we shall never use any other. We have, however, made one slight improvement on their method: we shall not take a gun, thereby obviating the last remote possibility of having the hunt cluttered up with game.

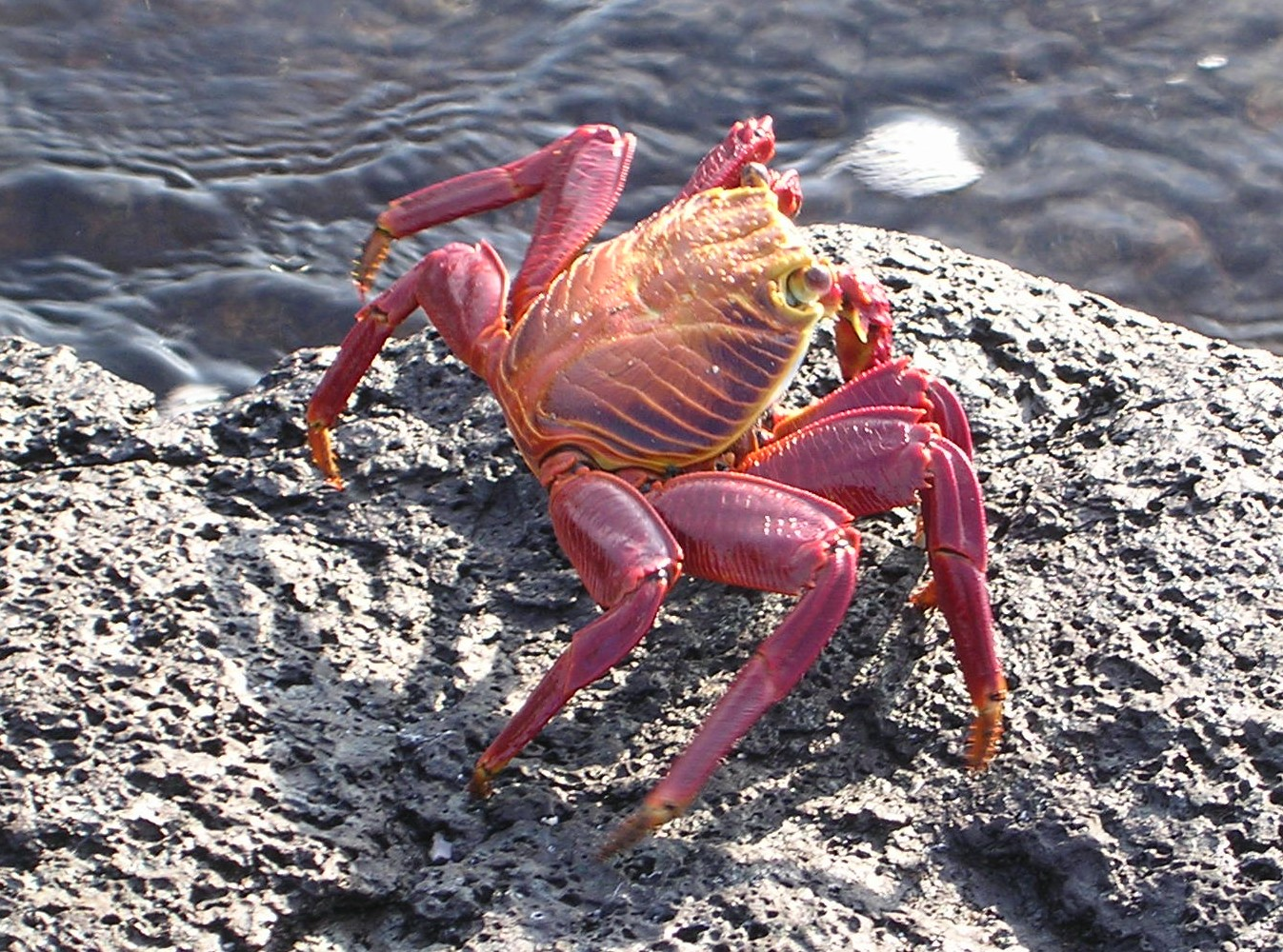
Sally Lightfoot crabs were common on the shores of the Gulf, but difficult to catch. Tiny declared war on them after slipping while trying to catch a specimen.

Puerto Escondido proved to be a rich collecting ground, and after nine days in the Gulf, they had to scale back their collecting ambitions owing to lack of space for the specimens. It had already become clear that there were certain species that were ubiquitous in the region: some species of crabs, sea anemones, limpets, barnacles and sea cucumbers were found at every stop, and the sun star, Heliaster kubiniji, the sea urchin, Arbacia incisa, and bristleworms of the Eurythoe genus were common.

Leaving Puerto Escondido, they continued up the coast to Loreto, where they restocked their supplies. They then visited the Coronado Islands, Concepcíon Bay and San Lucas Cove, collecting specimens at each stop. The work was exhausting; Steinbeck wrote in his letters that he had little time for sleep because the collecting and preparation took so long. In the cramped quarters of the boat, all the equipment had to be set up and stowed each time the boat moved to a new anchorage, which made the work of cataloguing and processing the specimens doubly arduous.

Making their way to San Carlos Bay, they bypassed the town of Santa Rosalía, and entered the sparsely populated upper Gulf, stopping at San Francisquito Bay. On April 1, they made for Bahía de los Ángeles, which was to be the last stop on the peninsula before they crossed to the mainland coast. On April 2 they rounded Isla Ángel de la Guarda, and anchored in Puerto Refugio for the night. The next morning they made for Tiburón Island, on the eastern side of the Gulf. They collected specimens at Red Point Bluff, keeping an eye out for the Seri, a local tribe who they had heard were rumored to be cannibals:

In our usual condition of hunger, it would have been a toss-up whether Seris ate us or we ate Seris. The one who got in the first bite would have had the dinner, but we never did see a Seri.

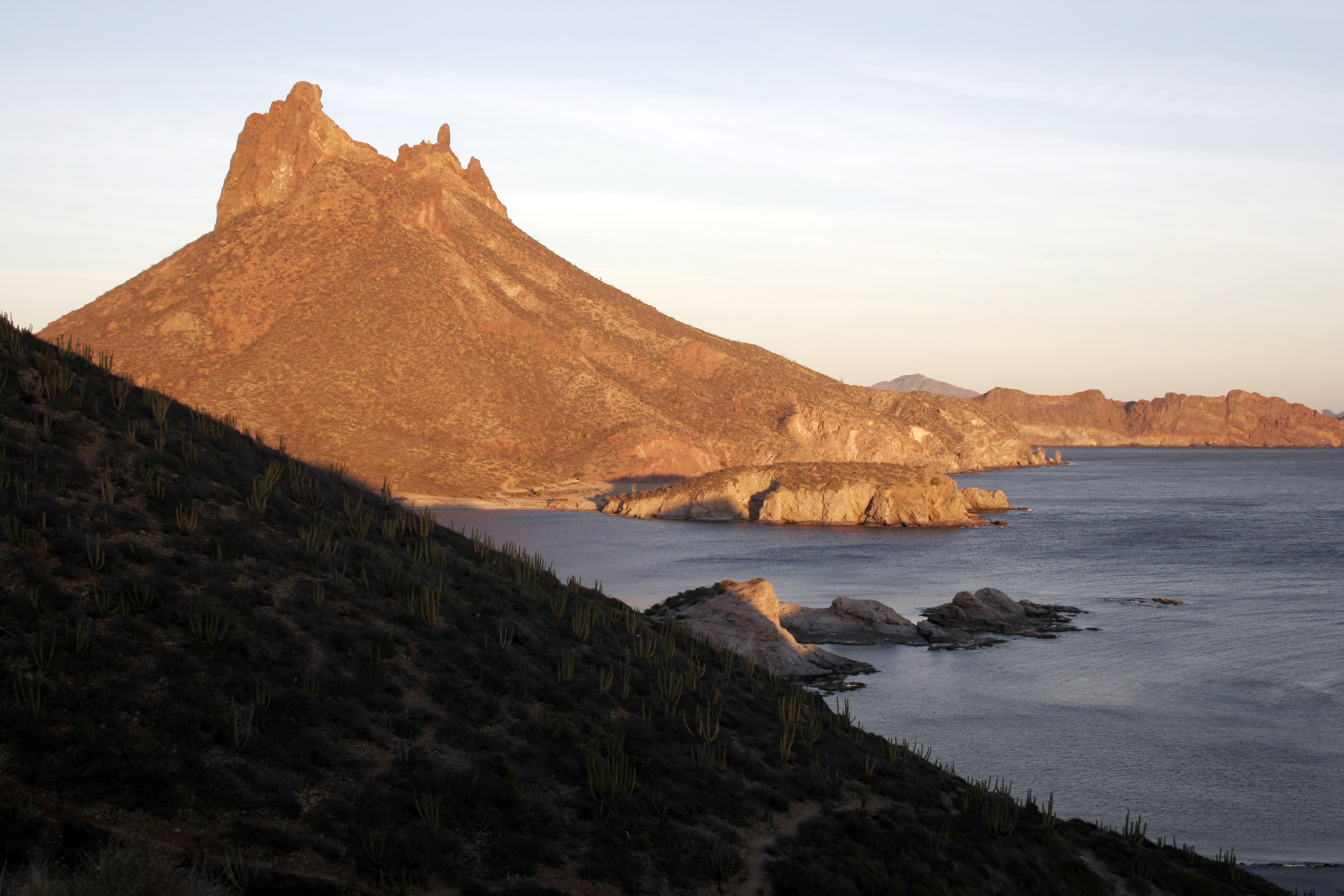
Puerto San Carlos

Although the crew were eager to get to Guaymas as soon as possible, it was too far for a single day's journey, so the next day they put in at Puerto San Carlos, where they collected. Early the next morning they made the short run to Guaymas.

They left Guaymas on the morning of April 8 and, only an hour out, encountered a Japanese fishing fleet dredging the bottom. Although initially wary, the crew of one of the boats welcomed Steinbeck and Ricketts on board and allowed them to select some specimens from the catch, though to the annoyance of the crew of the Western Flyer, Ricketts and Steinbeck forgot to get any fish to eat. Taking leave of the fleet, they made for the Estero de la Luna, a huge estuary where Ricketts and Steinbeck became lost in fog while out on a collecting expedition, after the "Sea-Cow" once again refused to run. Although spooked by the episode, they were able to navigate back to the Western Flyer once the fog cleared.

Continuing down to Agiabampo lagoon, they stopped to collect along the shores, and then recrossed the Gulf by night, putting in at San Gabriel Bay for a last collection before making for home. On the afternoon of April 12 they secured all the equipment and laid in a course for San Diego.

The collecting trip had been very successful: they catalogued over 500 species of the fauna of the shores of the Gulf; recorded a species of brittle star, Ophiophragmus marginatus, last recorded nearly 100 years earlier; and discovered about 50 new species. Three species of sea anemone they discovered were named for them by Dr. Oskar Carlgren at the Lund University's Department of Zoology in Sweden: Palythoa rickettsii, Isometridium rickettsi, and Phialoba steinbecki.

== Book ==
=== Sea of Cortez ===
In 1941, the year after their return from the trip, Steinbeck and Ricketts published Sea of Cortez: A Leisurely Journal of Travel and Research, in which Steinbeck combined the daily journals of the trip with Ricketts' annotated specimen list. The title "Sea of Cortez" was preferred to the "Gulf of California" as a better-sounding and a more exciting name. It was assumed by many that Steinbeck had kept a journal during the trip and that the book was merely an amalgamation of his log and Ricketts' taxonomic list; but the two authors revealed that the journal was Ricketts'. Although Steinbeck had added to it during the journey, he had done the real work of editing it after they returned. The log was based on what Ricketts called the Verbatim Transcript, an account of the trip he had compiled from the various notes he kept during the trip. Much of the final narrative was little changed from Ricketts' notes; Steinbeck shifted from the first person singular to the first person plural and gave some of Ricketts' drier prose a poetic twist, but many of the scenes remained almost unchanged from the daily journal. The suggestion by Steinbeck's editor, Pascal Covici, that the title page should state that Steinbeck was the author and add that the appendices were by Ricketts met with blunt opposition from Steinbeck: "I not only disapprove of your plan — I forbid it". Steinbeck also drew upon the journal of Tony Berry, mostly to confirm dates and times.

The book is a travelogue and biological record, but also reveals the two men's philosophies: it dwells on the place of humans in the environment, the interconnection between single organisms and the larger ecosystem, and the themes of leaving and returning home. A number of ecological concerns, rare in 1940, are voiced, such as an imagined but horrific vision of the long term damage that the Japanese bottom fishing trawlers are doing to the sea bed. Although written as if it were the journal kept by Steinbeck during the voyage, the book is to some extent a work of fiction: the journals are not Steinbeck's, and his wife, who had accompanied him on the trip, is not mentioned (though at one point Steinbeck slips and mentions the matter of food for seven people). Since returning home is a theme throughout the narrative, the inclusion of his wife, a symbol of home, would have dissipated the effect. Steinbeck and Ricketts are never mentioned by name but are amalgamated into the first person "we" who narrate the log.

Original edition of Sea of Cortez: A Leisurely Journal of Travel and Research

A version of Ricketts' philosophical work "Essay on Non-teleological Thinking", which to some extent expressed both authors' outlooks, was included as the Easter Sunday chapter. Although Steinbeck altered the original, Ricketts expressed his satisfaction with the result. Becoming known as the "Easter Sunday Sermon", it explores the gap between the methods of science and faith and the common ground they share, and it expounds on the holistic approach both men took to ecology:

It is advisable to look from the tide pool to the stars and then back to the tide pool again.

Steinbeck enjoyed writing the book; it was a challenge to apply his novel-writing skills to a scientific subject. However, he doubted from an early stage that the book would sell well. He considered it would be a good read, but not for the "take-a-book-to-bed public". As he progressed further, he began to see that the book would have very limited appeal, but equally he was convinced that it was a good book and the best work he had done. He was happy that it took his writing in a new direction and would confound the attempts of the critics to pigeonhole him, and, with a slightly masochistic joy he looked forward to their "rage and contempt". In that, he was proved incorrect; the reviews were mixed, but largely favorable, focusing on his affirmation of humankind's place in the wider environment, and picking up on the excitement Steinbeck and Ricketts felt for their subject. Most felt that even though there were moments when Steinbeck was at his best, the blending of philosophy, travelogue and biological recording made for an uneven read:

Thus the reader will be enjoying the chase of Tethys the sea-hare when all of a sudden he will find himself becalmed in a soupy discussion of teleology. Most readers, one suspects, will prefer Tethys the sea-hare.

— Charles Curtiz Munz, "Fishing Trip", Nation, December 1941.

Those critics who looked beyond the narrative portion were impressed by Ricketts' catalogue. Marine biologist Joel W. Hedgpeth, writing in the San Francisco Chronicle, predicted it would be indispensable for students of the marine invertebrates of the Gulf of California. Steinbeck was right about the lack of popular appeal, however: the unusual mixture of taxonomic data and travelogue meant the book struggled to find an audience. Few copies were printed and it was soon all but forgotten. The country's entry into the war and plummeting book sales also had an effect. Ricketts' share of the revenues from sales did not even provide him with the money to pay back Steinbeck for financing the journey.^{[c]}

=== Reissue ===
Ricketts was killed in 1948 when a train collided with his car while he was crossing the rail tracks. Ricketts' death severely hurt Steinbeck: "he was part of my brain for 18 years". Although Steinbeck had moved to New York City shortly after the journey and the two men had not seen as much of each other in the following years, they had corresponded by mail and had been planning a further expedition, this time northwards to the Aleutian Islands.

In 1951 Steinbeck republished the narrative portion of Sea of Cortez as The Log from the Sea of Cortez, dropping Ricketts' species list and adding a preface entitled "About Ed Ricketts", a biography of his friend.

Pascal Covici had always regarded Ricketts as a hanger-on and had been keen to deny his authorship of the original book. He pushed Steinbeck to get Ricketts' son, Ed Jr., to sign over the copyright to the narrative portion of the book, so that the reissued version could credit Steinbeck alone. Covici suggested a 15–20% share of the royalties as a recompense; but Ed Jr., knowing that the narrative was largely Ricketts' own, insisted on 25%. With the copyright secured, Ricketts' name was dropped from the cover, though the title page acknowledged that the book was "the narrative portion of the Sea of Cortez by John Steinbeck and E.F. Ricketts", and throughout his life, Steinbeck insisted on referring to the work as a collaboration. The republished narrative is unchanged from the original published in Sea of Cortez.^{[d]}

The republished version enjoyed greater success than the original. Although, by the time of his death in 1968, Steinbeck's reputation was at an all-time low owing to his mediocre output during the last decades of his life and his support for American involvement in Vietnam, his books have slowly regained their popularity. The Log from the Sea of Cortez became an important work within his oeuvre, not only as an interesting travelogue and work of non-fiction, but for its first-hand account of Ed Ricketts, the man whose thinking had so much influence on the course of Steinbeck's writing and on whom he had based so many of his pivotal characters. Whereas earlier critics mostly assumed that "Mr. Ricketts contributed some of the biology, and Mr. Steinbeck all of the prose", the publication of Ricketts' rediscovered original notes in 2003 has revealed how closely Steinbeck followed Ricketts' journal. This has forced a re-evaluation of how far it is fair to attribute authorship of the narrative portion of Sea of Cortez to Steinbeck, and has caused critics to view the removal of Ricketts' name from the cover as reflecting badly on Steinbeck.

Travels With Charley: In Search of America, another non-fiction travelogue which Steinbeck wrote in 1962, is seen as a more rounded view of the author late in life, but The Log from the Sea of Cortez is regarded as showing the direct influence of Ed Ricketts and his philosophies on Steinbeck, and provides clues to the underlying rationales for some events in his novels. In particular, "About Ed Ricketts" reveals how closely he was tied to the characters in Steinbeck's novels: parts are taken almost verbatim from descriptions of "Doc" in Cannery Row. The book is also important for seeing something of Ed Ricketts himself. It was the only example of his philosophical writings published in his lifetime. The "Essay on Non-teleological Thinking" was part of a trilogy of philosophical essays he had written before the trip, and which, with Steinbeck's help, he continued to try to have published until his death. As a travelogue it captures a lost world. Even as they were making the trip, a new hotel was being built in La Paz. Steinbeck bemoaned the coming of tourism:

Probably the airplanes will bring week-enders from Los Angeles before long, and the beautiful poor bedraggled old town will bloom with a Floridian ugliness.

As of 2004 Cabo San Lucas is home to luxury hotels and the houses of American rock stars, and many of the small villages have become suburbs of the larger towns of the Gulf, but people still visit, attempting to capture something of the spirit of the leisurely journey Steinbeck and Ricketts took around the Sea of Cortez.

== Legacy ==
The derelict Western Flyer was rescued in 2015, and has been restored as an educational and scientific project by the Western Flyer Foundation.

== Notes ==
a. Sparky Enea and Tiny Colletto later featured in a scene in Steinbeck's Cannery Row: "Sparky Enea and Tiny Colletti had made up a quarrel and were helping Jimmy to celebrate his birthday".

b. Dates in this section are taken from The Log from the Sea of Cortez, though there is some doubt as to the accuracy of the dates: Chapter 25 of the book is headed "April 22" and sandwiched between two chapters for "April 3" and "April 5". The Western Flyer returned to Monterey on 20 April.

c. The timing of the release of the book did nothing to help sales. It was published in the first week of December: the attack on Pearl Harbor on December 7, 1941, and the subsequent entry of the United States into World War II focused the attention of the American people elsewhere.

d. The republished narrative section even refers to the expunged appendix.
