= Metridin =

Enzyme

Identifiers
- EC no.: 3.4.21.3
- CAS no.: 37288-75-8

Databases
- IntEnz: IntEnz view
- BRENDA: BRENDA entry
- ExPASy: NiceZyme view
- KEGG: KEGG entry
- MetaCyc: metabolic pathway
- PRIAM: profile
- PDB structures: RCSB PDB PDBe PDBsum
Search
- PMC: articles
- PubMed: articles
- NCBI: proteins

Metridin (EC 3.4.21.3, Metridium proteinase A, sea anemone protease A, sea anemone proteinase A) is an enzyme. This enzyme catalyses the following chemical reaction

Preferential cleavage: Tyr-, Phe-, Leu-; little action on Trp-

This digestive enzyme is isolated from the sea anemone Metridium senile.
