= Myrtle E. Johnson =

American marine biologist, ascidiologist, and educator

Myrtle Elizabeth Johnson
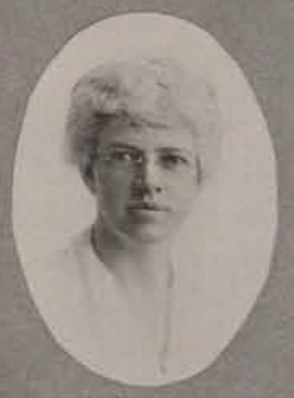
- Johnson c. 1922
- Born: June 4, 1881; East Troy, Wisconsin, US
- Died: August 17, 1967 (aged 86); San Diego, California, US
- Education: University of California, Berkeley
- Scientific career
- Fields: Marine Biology
- Workplaces: San Diego State University

Myrtle Elizabeth Johnson (1881 – 1967) was an American marine biologist, ascidiologist, and educator in California in the early 20th century. She was the first woman PhD faculty member at the San Diego State College (now San Diego State University), where she taught from 1921 to 1946, and was chair of the Biology department from 1928 to 1940. Her major work, Seashore Animals of the Pacific Coast, published in 1927, was the standard descriptive text of intertidal species until Ed Ricketts's Between Pacific Tides was published in 1939. Ricketts considered Johnson's book "the vade mecum of marine biologists of the Pacific. Indispensable."

== Biography ==
Johnson was born on June 4, 1881, in East Troy, Wisconsin to Marian Gray Johnson and Dr. Theodore F. Johnson. In 1887, the Johnson family moved to National City, south of San Diego, for Theodore's health. Johnson attended San Diego State Normal School (now San Diego State University), graduating with a teaching credential in 1901. She taught in elementary and junior high schools in south San Diego, Palomar, and the Los Angeles city schools, before matriculating at the University of California, Berkeley in 1904. Johnson received her B.S. in Math and Zoology in 1908, and an M.S. in zoology (with a secondary teaching credential) in 1909. She worked as a research assistant to William Ritter at the Marine Biological Association in La Jolla (1909-1910) before continuing post-graduate study in Zoology, working with Dr. Harry Beal Torrey. She received her PhD (Zoology) in 1912.

While working as a high school biology teacher in Pasadena (1912-1921), Johnson began work (1915) on a study of intertidal species with another Pasadena high school biologist, Harry James Snook. They continued to work on the text after Johnson joined the faculty of San Diego State College in 1921. Johnson and Snook's Seashore Animals of the Pacific Coast was first published in 1927, with a total of 4 printings (1927, 1935, 1955, 1967), with no second edition ever being completed. She was a fellow of the American Association for the Advancement of Science, California Academy of Sciences, and the San Diego Society of Natural History.

Johnson died on August 17, 1967, in San Diego.

== Selected bibliography ==
- Johnson, Myrtle E. (1937). West coast marine shells. Ann Arbor, Mich.: Edwards Brothers.
- Johnson, Myrtle E; Harwood, Robert D; Harvey, Dorothy R; Crouch, James E (1936). How living things get food. Sacramento: Published by California State Dept. of Education?: California State Printing Office.
- Johnson, Myrtle E.; Snook, Harry James (1927). Seashore animals of the Pacific coast. New York: Macmillan Company. ISBN 9780486218199.
- Johnson, Myrtle E. (30 November 1920). "Salt water aquaria for the school laboratory". School Science and Mathematics. 20 (9): 779–781. doi:10.1111/j.1949-8594.1920.tb07875.x.
- Johnson, Myrtle E. (1913). The control of pigment formation in amphibian larvae (dissertation). Berkeley: University of California Press.
- Ritter, William E.; Johnson, Myrtle E. (1912). "The growth and differentiation of the chain of cyclosalpa affinis". Journal of Morphology. 22. doi:10.1002/jmor.1050220209. S2CID 83830228.
- Johnson, Myrtle E. (1909). "A quantitative study of the development of the salpa chain (Salpa Fusiformis Runcinata)".
