= Actinia priapus =

Actinia priapus is an unaccepted scientific name and may refer to:

- Calliactis parasitica, a species of sea anemone
- Metridium farcimen, the giant plumose anemone
