= Metridium canum =

Scientific classification
- Kingdom: Animalia
- Phylum: Cnidaria
- Subphylum: Anthozoa
- Class: Hexacorallia
- Order: Actiniaria
- Family: Metridiidae
- Genus: Metridium
- Species: M. canum

Binomial name
- Metridium canum Stuckey, 1914

Species of sea anemone

Metridium canum is a species of sea anemone in the family Metridiidae. It is found in the southwestern Pacific Ocean and the seas off New Zealand.

== Description ==
M. canum has a cylindrical column of about 10mm diameter, that is wider at the base than it is high when contracted. Cinclides (specialist pores) are present on the upper part of the column, and there are four or five whorls of crowded tentacles on the oral disc. Internally, there are forty-five pairs of mesenteries in four cycles radiating from the body wall. This sea anemone is grey, the tentacles sometimes having black tips.

== Distribution and habitat ==
The species is native to the Southwest Pacific and the Kermadec Islands. Its typical habitat is sand or mud where it is attached to the undersides of stones.
