= Intertidal wetland =

Climate ecosystem

An intertidal wetland is an area along a shoreline that is exposed to air at low tide and submerged at high tide. This type of wetland is defined by an intertidal zone and includes its own intertidal ecosystems.

== Description ==
The main types of intertidal wetlands are mudflats (e.g., mangrove swamps) and salt marshes. The mangrove swamps are encountered along tropical shores and are characterized by tree vegetation, while salt marshes are mostly found in temperate zones and are mostly grass ecosystems.

Intertidal wetlands are commonly encountered in most estuaries. Intertidal wetland ecosystems are among the most productive plant communities and often constitute a large part of the estuary areas.

== See also ==
- Tidal marsh
