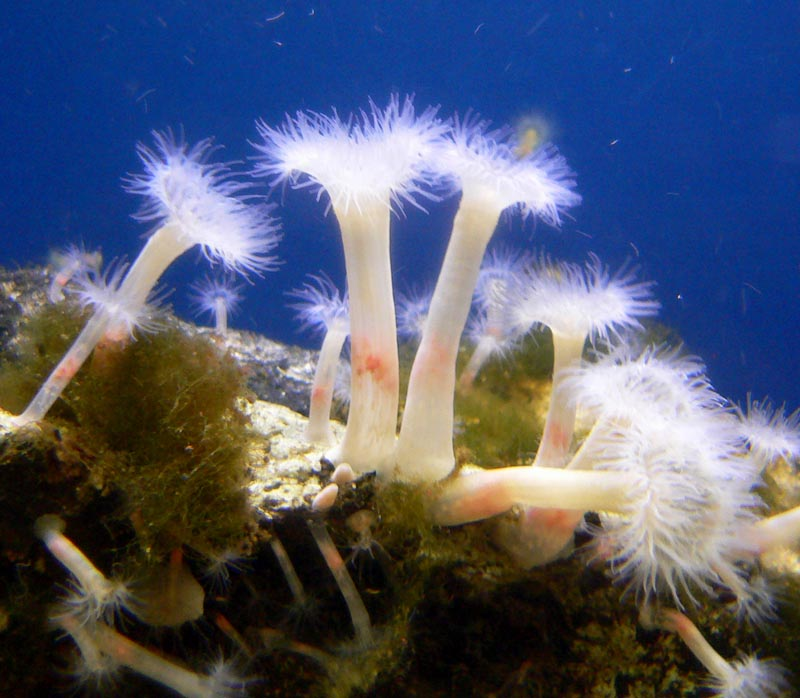
- Metridium senile

Scientific classification
- Domain: Eukaryota
- Kingdom: Animalia
- Phylum: Cnidaria
- Subphylum: Anthozoa
- Class: Hexacorallia
- Order: Actiniaria
- Family: Metridiidae
- Genus: Metridium; Blainville, 1824

Species
- See text

= Metridium =

Plumose anemone

Genus of sea anemones

Members of the genus Metridium, also known as plumose anemones, are sea anemones found mostly in the cooler waters of the northern Pacific and Atlantic oceans. They are characterized by their numerous threadlike tentacles extending from atop a smooth cylindrical column, and can vary from a few centimeters in height up to one meter or more. In larger specimens, the oral disk becomes densely curved and frilly.

== Species ==
The following species are recognised in the World Register of Marine Species (WoRMS):

- Metridium canum Stuckey, 1914
- Metridium dianthus Ellis, 1768
- Metridium exile Hand, 1956
- Metridium farcimen (Tilesius, 1809) – giant plumose anemone or white-plumed anemone
- Metridium huanghaiensis Pei, 1998
- Metridium senile (Linnaeus, 1761) – frilled anemone
- Metridium sinensis Pei, 1998
