= Western Flyer (boat) =

1937 fishing boat built in Washington

The Western Flyer is a fishing boat, most known for its use by John Steinbeck and Ed Ricketts in their 1940 expedition to the Gulf of California, the notes from which culminated in their 1941 book Sea of Cortez, later reworked by Steinbeck into The Log from the Sea of Cortez (1951). According to Kevin Bailey, "the most famous fishing vessel ever to have sailed", the 77-foot (23 m) Western Flyer was restored in Port Townsend, Washington. The Western Flyer Foundation was formed with the goal of educating youth about the intersection of science and literature.

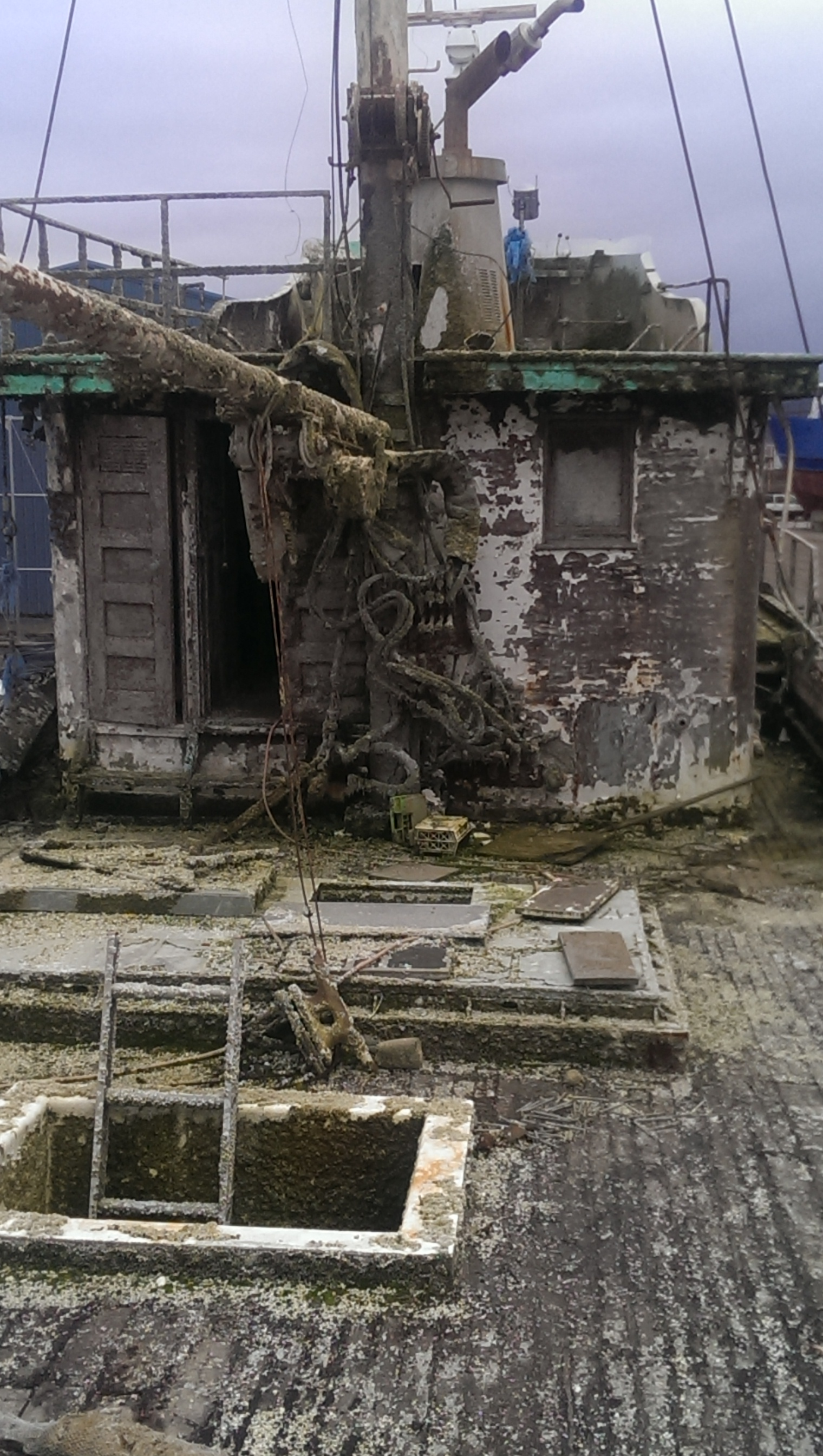
The Western Flyer after falling into disrepair, January 2015

== Construction ==
The Western Flyer was built in Tacoma, Washington, in 1937 by the Western Boat Building Company, owned by Martin Petrich. Petrich partnered with brothers Tony and Frank Berry to build the seiner, which is made from old-growth fir. It was designed specifically for the Monterey, California sardine fishery, with the capability of heading to Alaska annually for salmon. On July 3, 1937, the Flyer was completed.

== Steinbeck and the Sea of Cortez ==
Steinbeck and Ricketts chartered the Western Flyer in 1940 for a voyage to the Sea of Cortez. The Flyer was captained by Anton "Tony" Berry, with crew members Tex Travis, Horace "Sparky" Enea, and "Tiny" Colletto. Steinbeck's wife, Carol, was also on board for the excursion. They embarked on March 11, 1940, from Monterey. Along the coast, Steinbeck and Ricketts collected specimens, logging their observations, many of which were included in "The Log". The journey ended on April 16, 1940, in San Diego, California, after a journey of 4,000 miles (6,400 km).

== After Steinbeck ==
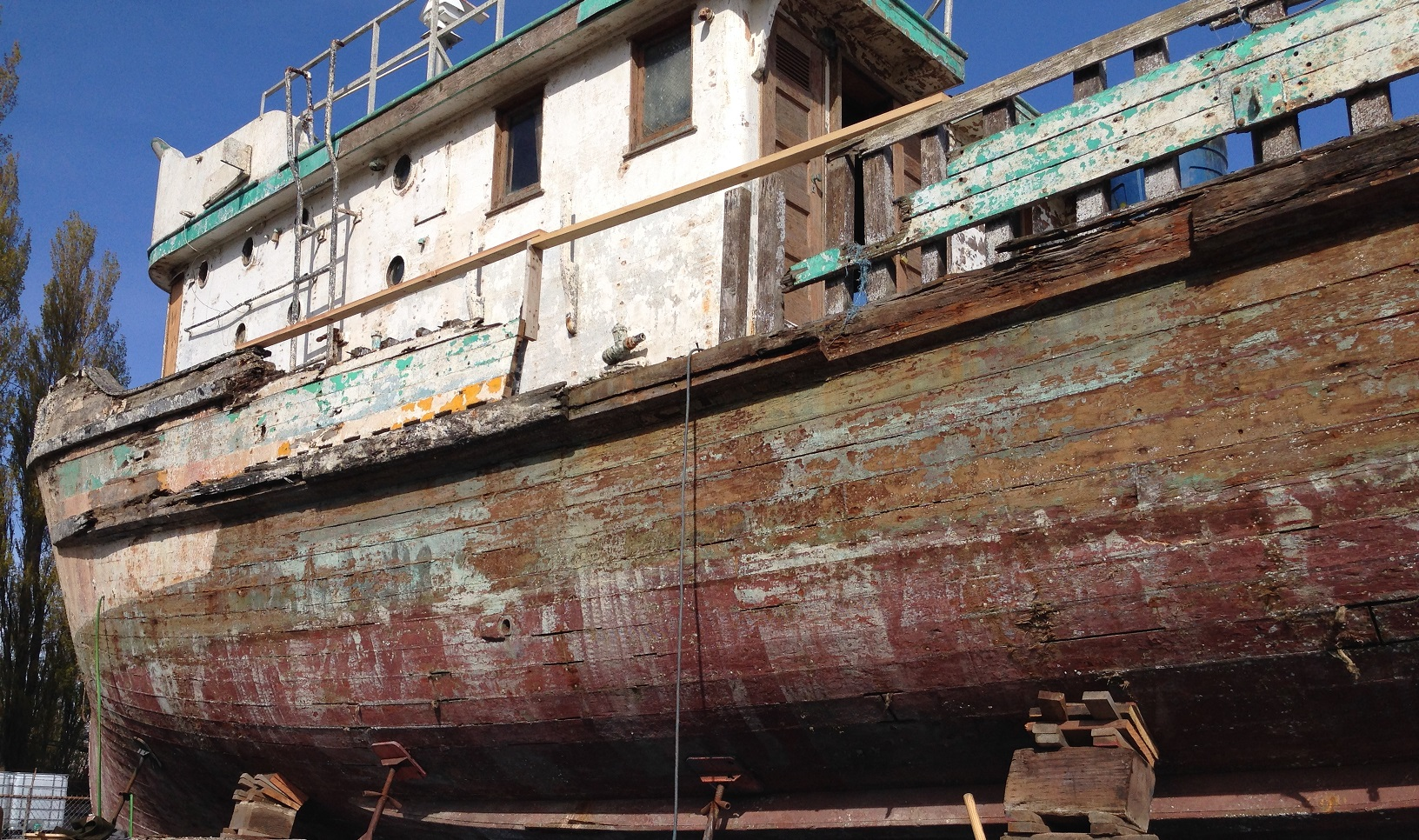
The Western Flyer in Port Townsend, WA in April 2015.

Following Steinbeck's voyage, the ship was returned to its main purpose: fishing. Over the ensuing years it was used to harvest sardines, perch, and crab, angling from California to Alaska's Aleutian Islands. In 1983 Bob Enea, the nephew of Tony Berry, began a search for the Western Flyer which had been renamed Gemini. Enea discovered the boat in Anacortes, Washington in 1986 where it was still operating as a commercial fishing vessel. His attempts to purchase the boat from owner Ole Knudson were rebuffed until 1993 when Knudson decided to retire from fishing and offered to sell the ship to Enea for $100,000. Enea established the non-profit Western Flyer Project to raise money to purchase the vessel. The publicity generated by the announcement of the Western Flyer's discovery attracted the attention of real estate developer Gerry Kehoe who immediately purchased the boat from Knudson over Enea's objections, announcing plans to move it to Salinas where it would be placed in drydock as the centerpiece of a new theme restaurant.

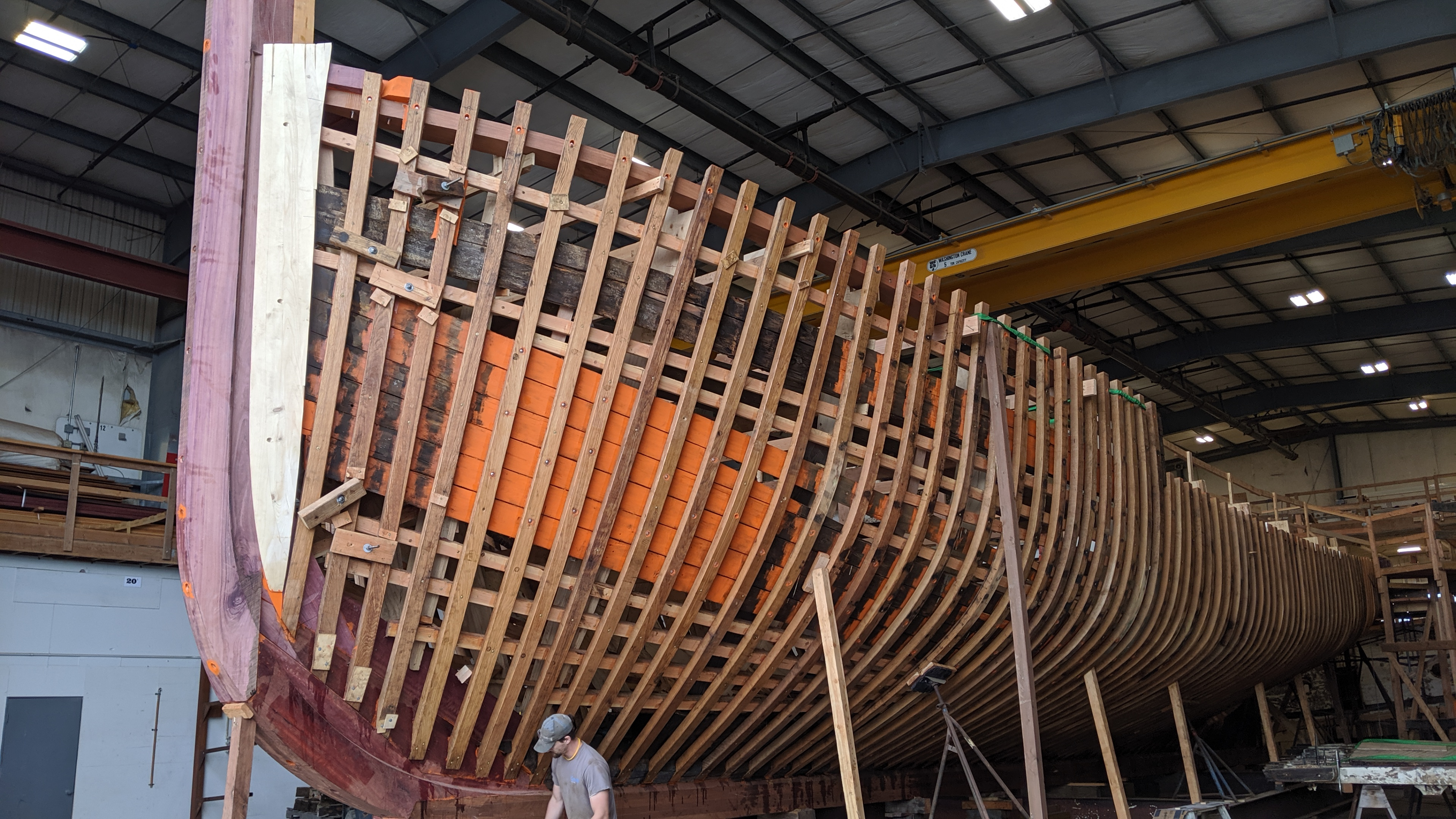
Hull Restoration of the Western Flyer, Port Townsend, WA 2019

Twice in 2012 the boat sprang leaks and sank, being refloated each time. After the second sinking, Kehoe transported the boat from Anacortes to Port Townsend, Washington to undergo refurbishment in preparation for relocation to Salinas.

== Restoration ==
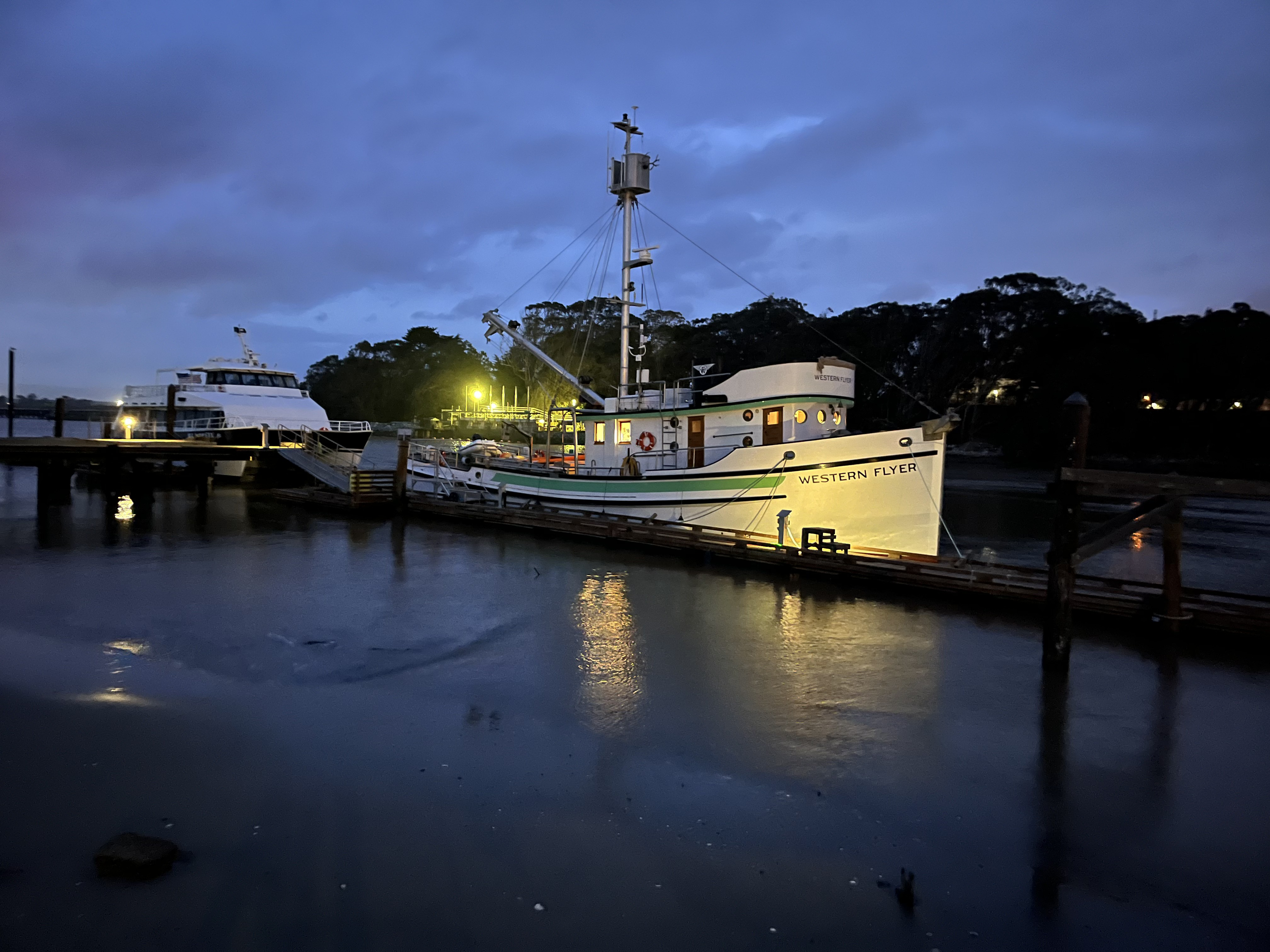
The now restored Western Flyer at her home port of Moss Landing, California

In early 2015 the boat was sold to John Gregg for a reported $1,000,000. Gregg enlisted Port Townsend Shipwrights Co-Op to restore the vessel to its historic glory, while exceeding modern safety, technological, and environmental standards. The vessel includes a custom Remotely operated underwater vehicle, designed by Gregg, that resembles a nautilus. In 2016, The Western Flyer Foundation was established to support Western Flyer's focus on public education and science; students will participate in the collection of real data, implementing a citizen science approach. On June 29, 2022, Western Flyer was relaunched after its restoration at Port Townsend was completed, and towed to Seattle to receive a new hybrid engine and further outfit, before returning to Monterey. The engine installation and the conversion of the fish hold to a science lab and teaching space were completed by Snow and Company, Seattle, in mid-2023 and on November 4 Western Flyer arrived at Monterey to complete outfitting.
