= Intertidal ecology =

Study of ecosystems, where organisms live between the low and high tide lines

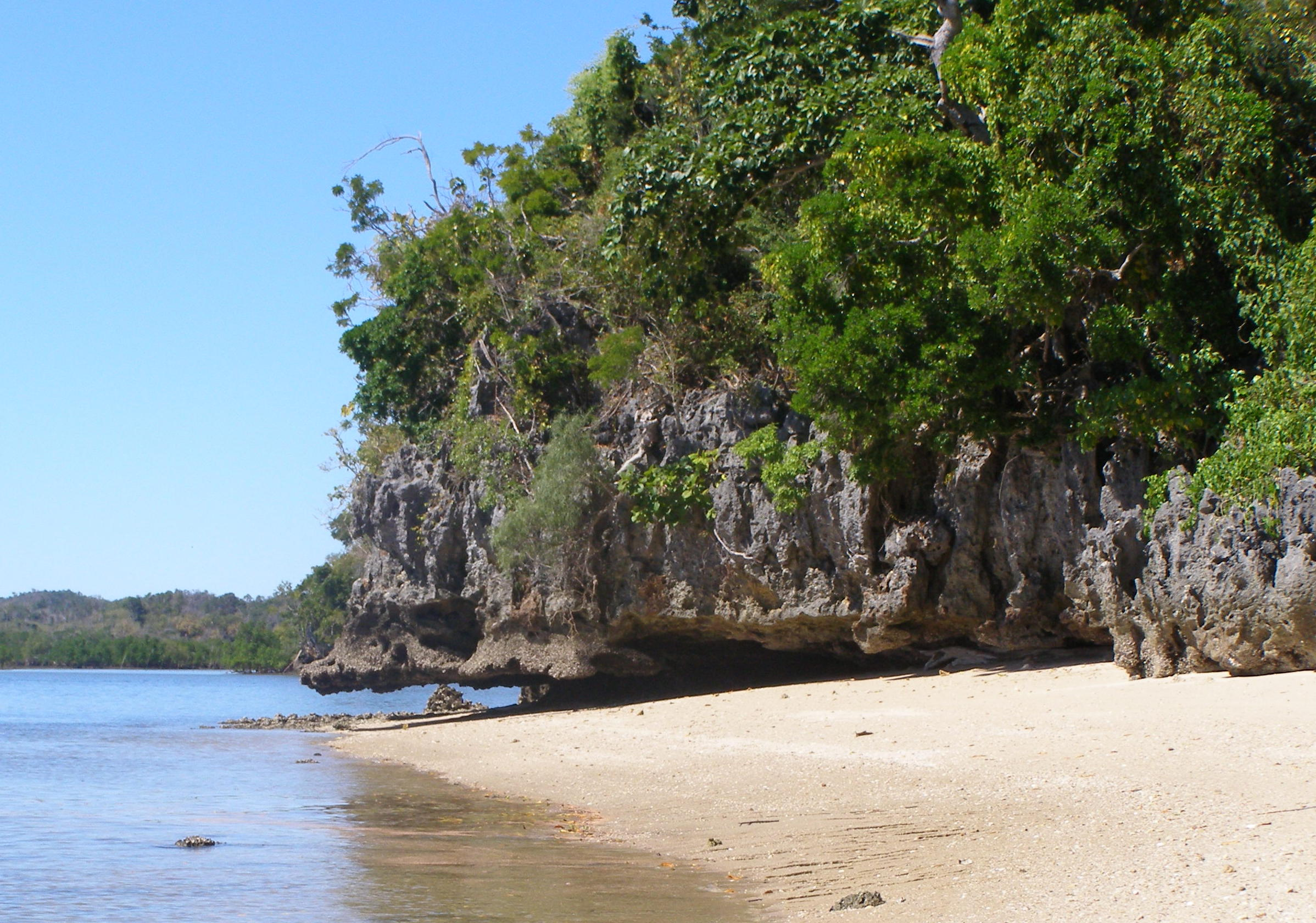
Anjajavy Forest on Tsingy rocks jutting into the Indian Ocean.

Intertidal ecology is the study of intertidal ecosystems, where organisms live between the low and high tide lines. At low tide, the intertidal is exposed whereas at high tide, the intertidal is underwater. Intertidal ecologists therefore study the interactions between intertidal organisms and their environment, as well as between different species of intertidal organisms within a particular intertidal community. The most important environmental and species interactions may vary based on the type of intertidal community being studied, the broadest of classifications being based on substrates—rocky shore and soft bottom communities.

Organisms living in this zone have a highly variable and often hostile environment, and have evolved various adaptations to cope with and even exploit these conditions. One easily visible feature of intertidal communities is vertical zonation, where the community is divided into distinct vertical bands of specific species going up the shore. Species ability to cope with abiotic factors associated with emersion stress, such as desiccation determines their upper limits, while biotic interactions e.g.competition with other species sets their lower limits.

Intertidal regions are utilized by humans for food and recreation, but anthropogenic actions also have major impacts, with overexploitation, invasive species and climate change being among the problems faced by intertidal communities. In some places Marine Protected Areas have been established to protect these areas and aid in scientific research.

== Types of intertidal communities ==
Intertidal habitats can be characterized as having either hard or soft bottoms substrates. Rocky intertidal communities occur on rocky shores, such as headlands, cobble beaches, or human-made jetties. Their degree of exposure may be calculated using the Ballantine Scale. Soft-sediment habitats include sandy beaches, and intertidal wetlands (e.g., mudflats and salt marshes). These habitats differ in levels of abiotic, or non-living, environmental factors. Rocky shores tend to have higher wave action, requiring adaptations allowing the inhabitants to cling tightly to the rocks. Soft-bottom habitats are generally protected from large waves but tend to have more variable salinity levels. They also offer a third habitable dimension: depth. Thus, many soft-sediment inhabitants are adapted for burrowing.

== Environment ==
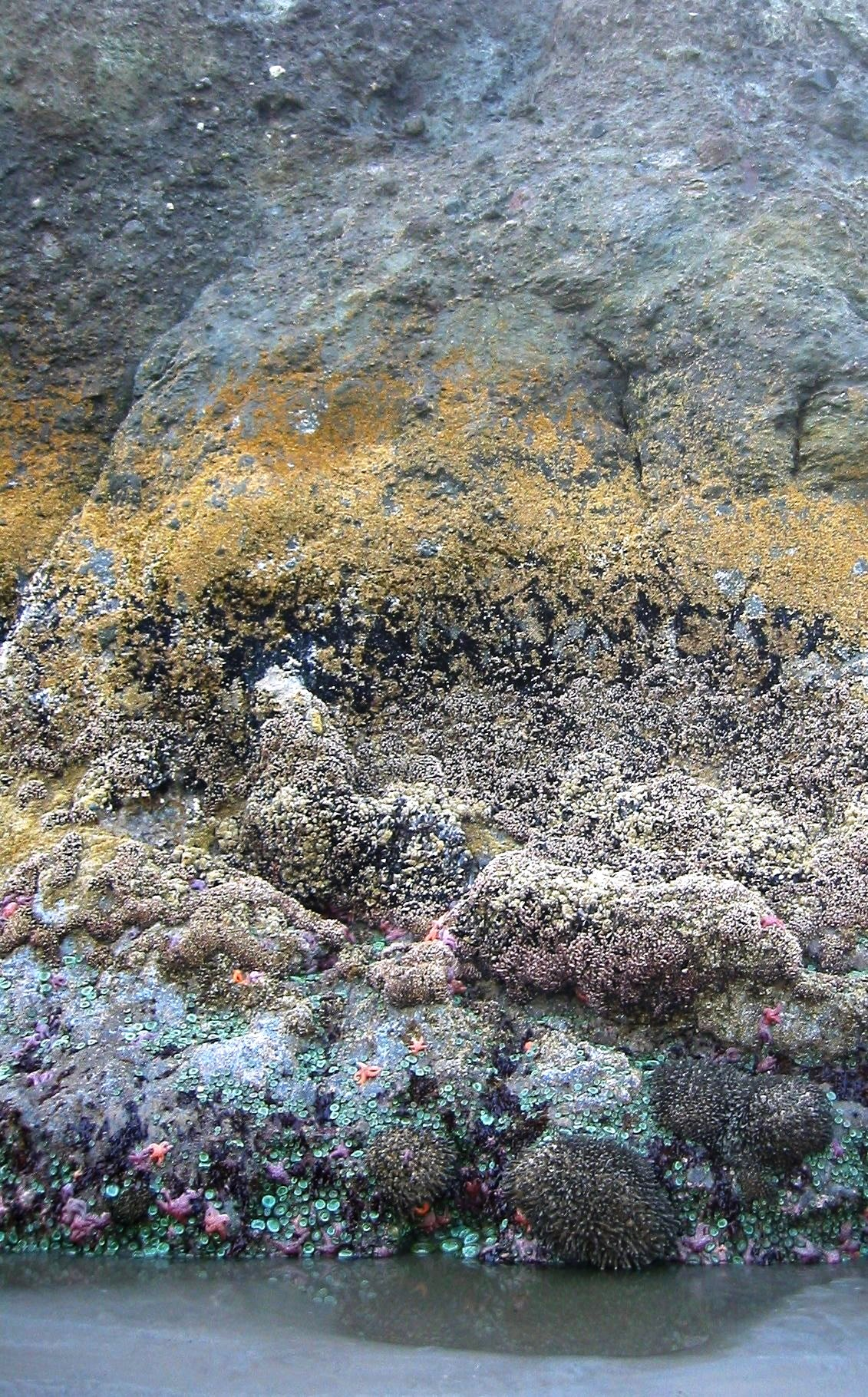
A rock, seen at low tide, exhibiting typical intertidal zonation.

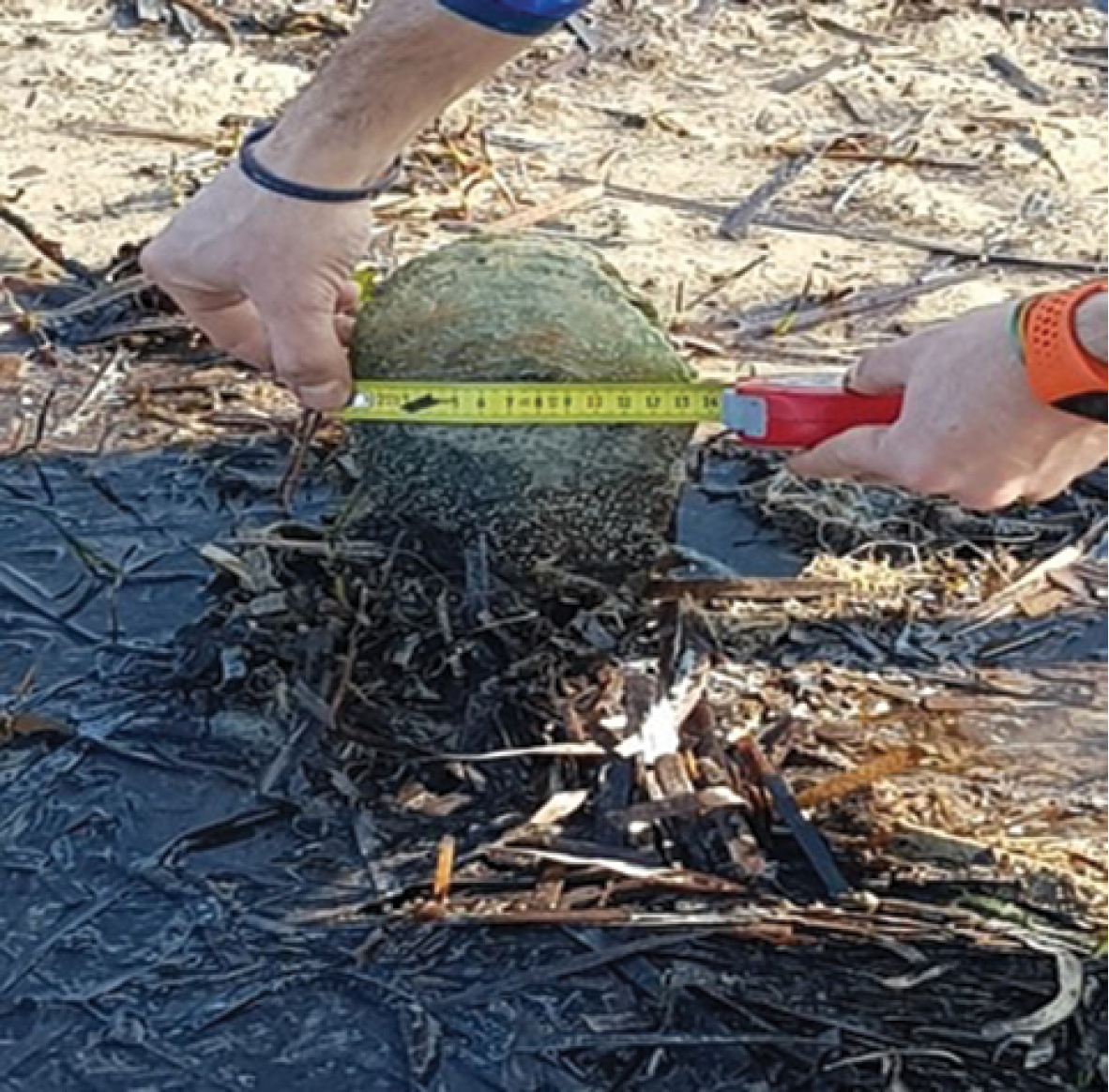
A specimen of the shell Pinna nobilis exposed by low tide

Because intertidal organisms endure regular periods of immersion and emersion, they essentially live both underwater and on land and must be adapted to a large range of climatic conditions. The intensity of climate stressors varies with relative tide height because organisms living in areas with higher tide heights are emersed for longer periods than those living in areas with lower tide heights. This gradient of climate with tide height leads to patterns of intertidal zonation, with high intertidal species being more adapted to emersion stresses than low intertidal species. These adaptations may be behavioral (i.e. movements or actions), morphological (i.e. characteristics of external body structure), or physiological (i.e. internal functions of cells and organs). In addition, such adaptations generally cost the organism in terms of energy (e.g. to move or to grow certain structures), leading to trade-offs (i.e. spending more energy on deterring predators leaves less energy for other functions like reproduction).

Intertidal organisms, especially those in the high intertidal, must cope with a large range of temperatures. While they are underwater, temperatures may only vary by a few degrees over the year. However, at low tide, temperatures may dip to below freezing or may become scaldingly hot, leading to a temperature range that may approach 30 °C (86 °F) during a period of a few hours. Many mobile organisms, such as snails and crabs, avoid temperature fluctuations by crawling around and searching for food at high tide and hiding in cool, moist refuges (crevices or burrows) at low tide. Besides simply living at lower tide heights, non-motile organisms may be more dependent on coping mechanisms. For example, high intertidal organisms have a stronger stress response, a physiological response of making proteins that help recovery from temperature stress just as the immune response aids in the recovery from infection.

Intertidal organisms are also especially prone to desiccation during periods of emersion. Again, mobile organisms avoid desiccation in the same way as they avoid extreme temperatures: by hunkering down in mild and moist refuges. Many intertidal organisms, including Littorina snails, prevent water loss by having waterproof outer surfaces, pulling completely into their shells, and sealing shut their shell opening. Limpets (Patella) do not use such a sealing plate but occupy a home-scar to which they seal the lower edge of their flattened conical shell using a grinding action. They return to this home-scar after each grazing excursion, typically just before emersion. On soft rocks, these scars are quite obvious. Still other organisms, such as the algae Ulva and Porphyra, are able to rehydrate and recover after periods of severe desiccation.

The level of salinity can also be quite variable. Low salinities can be caused by rainwater or river inputs of freshwater. Estuarine species must be especially euryhaline, or able to tolerate a wide range of salinities. High salinities occur in locations with high evaporation rates, such as in salt marshes and high intertidal pools. Shading by plants, especially in the salt marsh, can slow evaporation and thus ameliorate salinity stress. In addition, salt marsh plants tolerate high salinities by several physiological mechanisms, including excreting salt through salt glands and preventing salt uptake into the roots.

In addition to these exposure stresses (temperature, desiccation, and salinity), intertidal organisms experience strong mechanical stresses, especially in locations of high wave action. There are myriad ways in which the organisms prevent dislodgement due to waves. Morphologically, many mollusks (such as limpets and chitons) have low-profile, hydrodynamic shells. Types of substrate attachments include mussels' tethering byssal threads and glues, sea stars' thousands of suctioning tube feet, and isopods' hook-like appendages that help them hold on to intertidal kelps. Higher profile organisms, such as kelps, must also avoid breaking in high flow locations, and they do so with their strength and flexibility. Finally, organisms can also avoid high flow environments, such as by seeking out low flow microhabitats. Additional forms of mechanical stresses include ice and sand scour, as well as dislodgment by water-borne rocks, logs, etc.

There are many species that are adapted to and thrive in this stressful location. For example, the tiny crustacean copepod Tigriopus thrives in very salty, high intertidal tidepools, and many filter feeders find more to eat in wavier and higher flow locations. Adapting to such challenging environments allows these organisms to exploit new niches.

== Food web structure ==
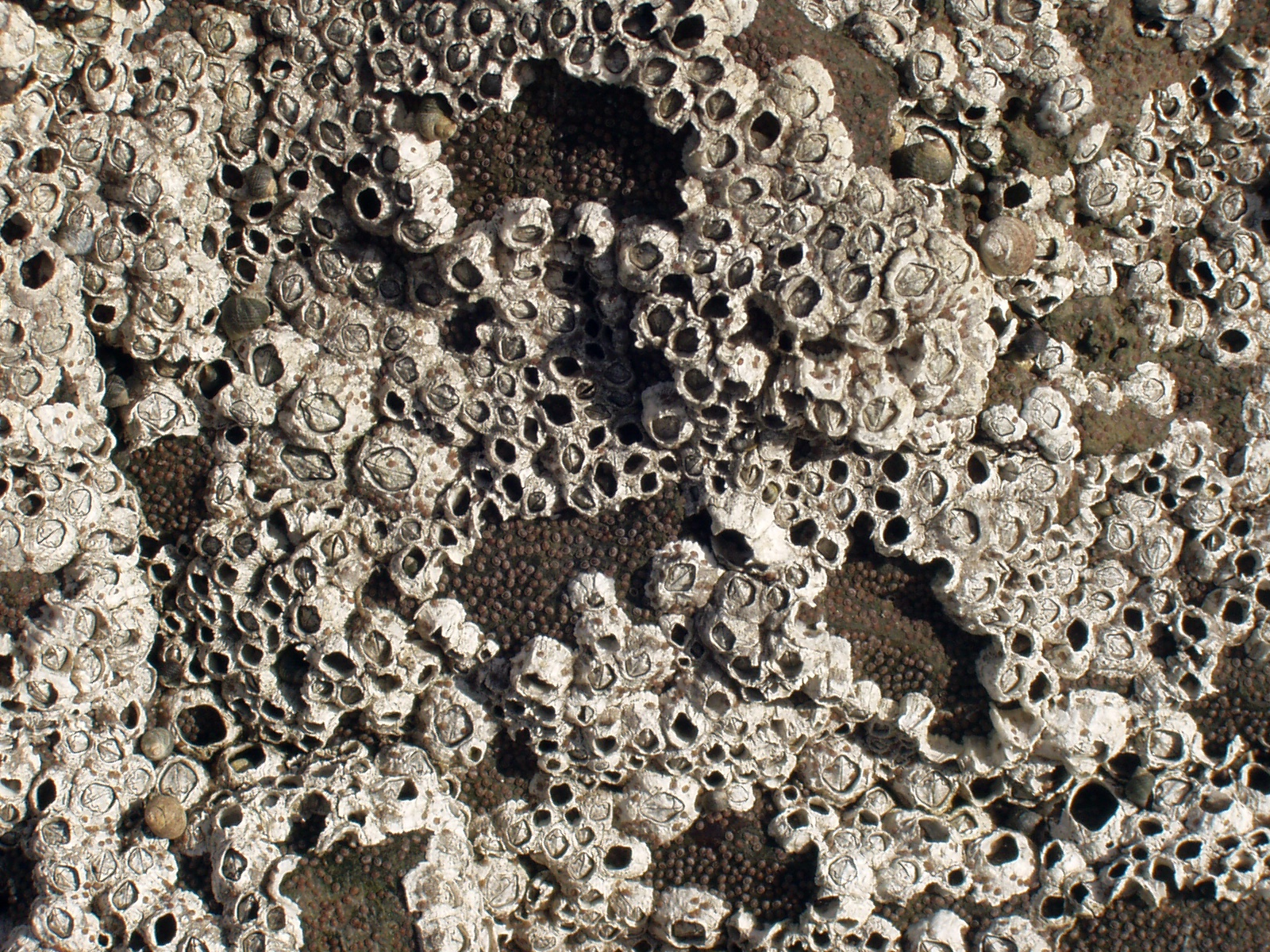
Semibalanus balanoides

During tidal immersion, the food supply to intertidal organisms is subsidized by materials carried in seawater, including photosynthesizing phytoplankton and consumer zooplankton. These plankton are eaten by numerous forms of filter feeders—mussels, clams, barnacles, sea squirts, and polychaete worms—which filter seawater in their search for planktonic food sources. The adjacent ocean is also a primary source of nutrients for autotrophs, photosynthesizing producers ranging in size from microscopic algae (e.g. benthic diatoms) to huge kelps and other seaweeds. These intertidal producers are eaten by herbivorous grazers, such as limpets that scrape rocks clean of their diatom layer and kelp crabs that creep along blades of the feather boa kelp Egregia eating the tiny leaf-shaped bladelets. Crabs are eaten by goliath grouper, which are then eaten by sharks. Higher up the food web, predatory consumers—especially voracious starfish—eat other grazers (e.g. snails) and filter feeders (e.g. mussels). Finally, scavengers, including crabs and sand fleas, eat dead organic material, including dead producers and consumers.

== Species interactions ==
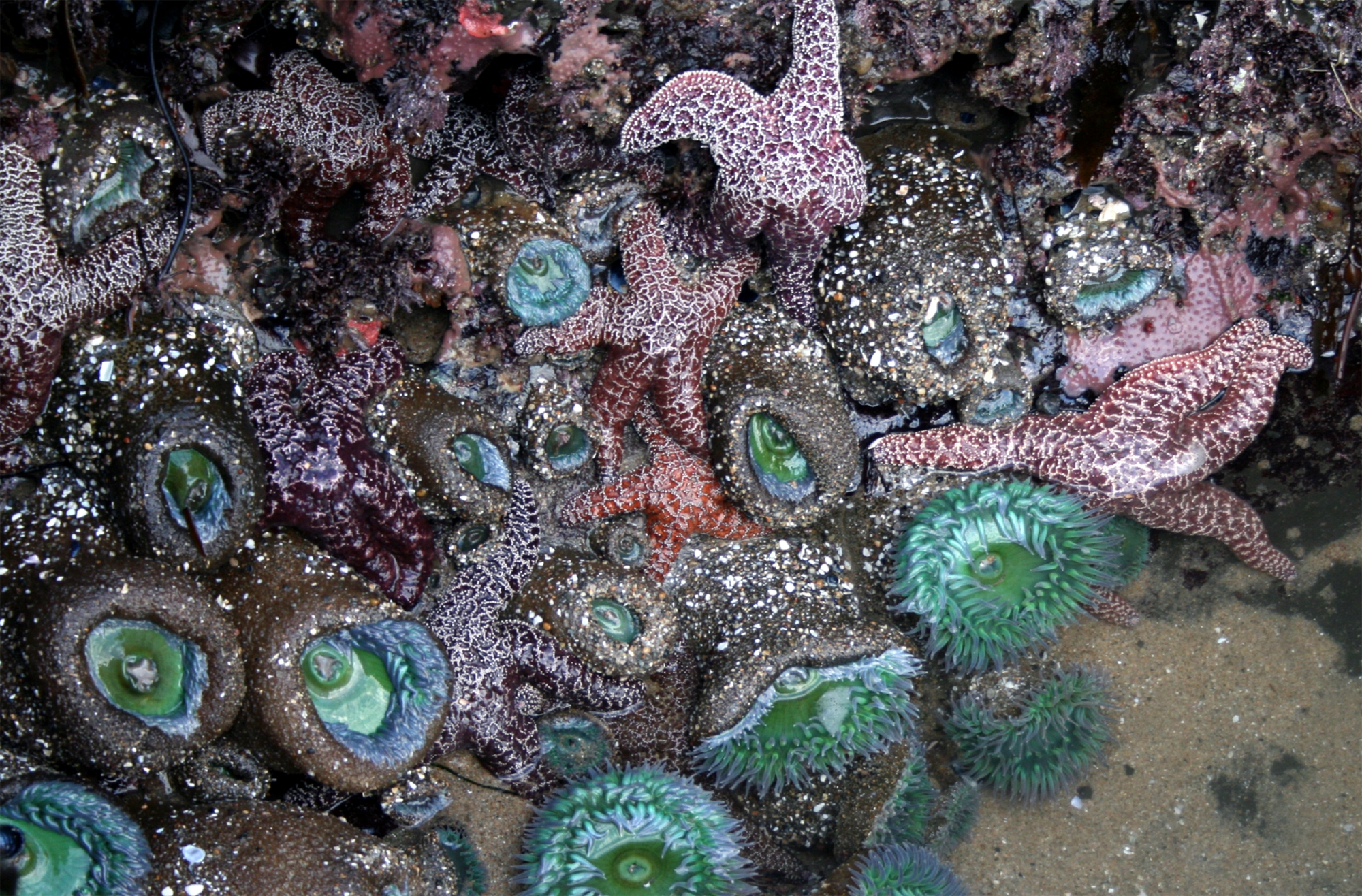
Tide pools with sea stars and sea anemone in Santa Cruz, California

In addition to being shaped by aspects of climate, intertidal habitats—especially intertidal zonation patterns—are strongly influenced by species interactions, such as predation, competition, facilitation, and indirect interactions. Ultimately, these interactions feed into the food web structure, described above. Intertidal habitats have been a model system for many classic ecological studies, including those introduced below, because the resident communities are particularly amenable to experimentation.

One dogma of intertidal ecology—supported by such classic studies—is that species' lower tide height limits are set by species interactions whereas their upper limits are set by climate variables. Classic studies by Robert Paine established that when sea star predators are removed, mussel beds extend to lower tide heights, smothering resident seaweeds. Thus, mussels' lower limits are set by sea star predation. Conversely, in the presence of sea stars, mussels' lower limits occur at a tide height at which sea stars are unable to tolerate climate conditions.

Competition, especially for space, is another dominant interaction structuring intertidal communities. Space competition is especially fierce in rocky intertidal habitats, where habitable space is limited compared to soft-sediment habitats in which three-dimensional space is available. As seen with the previous sea star example, mussels are competitively dominant when they are not kept in check by sea star predation. Joseph Connell's research on two types of high intertidal barnacles, Balanus balanoides, now Semibalanus balanoides, and a Chthamalus stellatus, showed that zonation patterns could also be set by competition between closely related organisms. In this example, Balanus outcompetes Chthamalus at lower tide heights but is unable to survive at higher tide heights. Thus, Balanus conforms to the intertidal ecology dogma introduced above: its lower tide height limit is set by a predatory snail and its higher tide height limit is set by climate. Similarly, Chthamalus, which occurs in a refuge from competition (similar to the temperature refuges discussed above), has a lower tide height limit set by competition with Balanus and a higher tide height limit is set by climate.

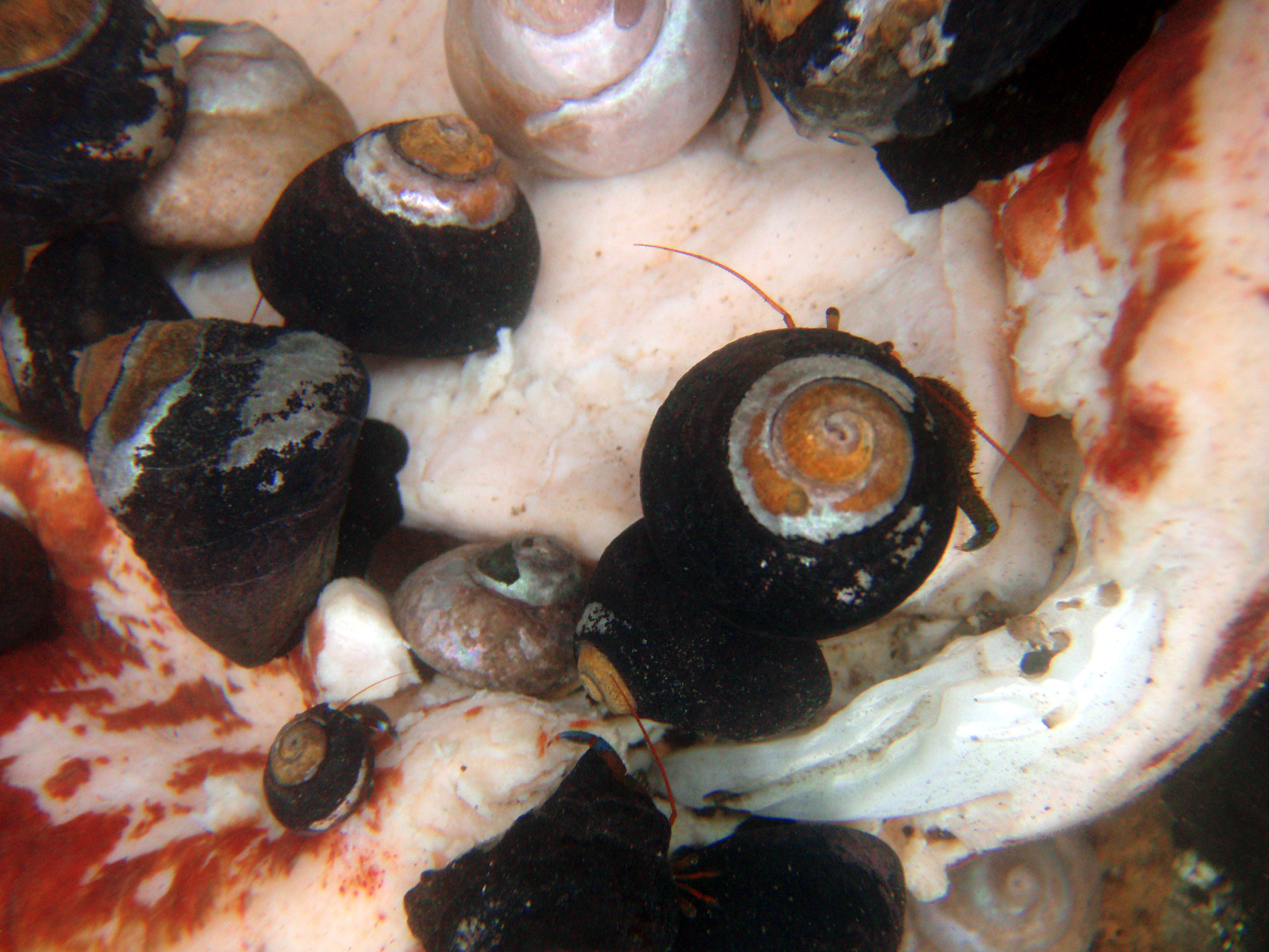
Hermit crabs and live Tegula snails on a dead gumboot chiton, Cryptochiton stelleri, in a tide pool at low tide in central California

Although intertidal ecology has traditionally focused on these negative interactions (predation and competition), there is emerging evidence that positive interactions are also important. Facilitation refers to one organism helping another without harming itself. For example, salt marsh plant species of Juncus and Iva are unable to tolerate the high soil salinities when evaporation rates are high, thus they depend on neighboring plants to shade the sediment, slow evaporation, and help maintain tolerable salinity levels. In similar examples, many intertidal organisms provide physical structures that are used as refuges by other organisms. Mussels, although they are tough competitors with certain species, are also good facilitators as mussel beds provide a three-dimensional habitat to species of snails, worms, and crustaceans.

All of the examples given so far are of direct interactions: Species A eats Species B or Species B eats Species C. Also important are indirect interactions where, using the previous example, Species A eats so much of Species B that predation on Species C decreases and Species C increases in number. Thus, Species A indirectly benefits Species C. Pathways of indirect interactions can include all other forms of species interactions. To follow the sea star-mussel relationship, sea stars have an indirect negative effect on the diverse community that lives in the mussel bed because, by preying on mussels and decreasing mussel bed structure, those species that are facilitated by mussels are left homeless. Additional important species interactions include mutualism, which is seen in symbioses between sea anemones and their internal symbiotic algae, and parasitism, which is prevalent but is only beginning to be appreciated for its effects on community structure.

== Current topics ==
Humans are highly dependent on intertidal habitats for food and raw materials, and over 50% of humans live within 100 km of the coast. Therefore, intertidal habitats are greatly influenced by human impacts to both ocean and land habitats. Some of the conservation issues associated with intertidal habitats and at the head of the agendas of managers and intertidal ecologists are:

1. Climate change: Intertidal species are challenged by several of the effects of global climate change, including increased temperatures, sea level rise, and increased storminess. Ultimately, it has been predicted that the distributions and numbers of species will shift depending on their abilities to adapt (quickly!) to these new environmental conditions. Due to the global scale of this issue, scientists are mainly working to understand and predict possible changes to intertidal habitats.

2. Invasive species: Invasive species are especially prevalent in intertidal areas with high volumes of shipping traffic, such as large estuaries, because of the transport of non-native species in ballast water. San Francisco Bay, in which an invasive Spartina cordgrass from the east coast is currently transforming mudflat communities into Spartina meadows, is among the most invaded estuaries in the world. Conservation efforts are focused on trying to eradicate some species (like Spartina) in their non-native habitats as well as preventing further species introductions (e.g. by controlling methods of ballast water uptake and release).

3. Marine protected areas: Many intertidal areas are lightly to heavily exploited by humans for food gathering (e.g. clam digging in soft-sediment habitats and snail, mussel, and algal collecting in rocky intertidal habitats). In some locations, marine protected areas have been established where no collecting is permitted. The benefits of protected areas may spill over to positively impact adjacent unprotected areas. For example, a greater number of larger egg capsules of the edible snail Concholepus in protected vs. non-protected areas in Chile indicates that these protected areas may help replenish snail stocks in areas open to harvesting. The degree to which collecting is regulated by law differs with the species and habitat.

== See also ==
- Intertidal zone
- List of British Isles rockpool life
- Littoral zone
- NaGISA
- Surf zone

== Bibliography ==
- Bertness, M. D., S. D. Gaines, and M. E. Hay (2001) Marine community ecology. Sinauer Associates, Inc.
- Kozloff E. N. (1973) Seashore life of the northern Pacific coast. University of Washington Press.
- Ricketts E. F., J. Calvin and J. W. Hedgpeth (1939) Between Pacific Tides (5th Ed.) Stanford University Press.
