= Ed Ricketts =

American marine biologist (1897–1948)

- Ricketts, 1937
- Born: Edward Flanders Robb Ricketts; May 14, 1897; Chicago, Illinois, U.S.
- Died: May 11, 1948 (aged 50); Monterey, California, U.S.
- Resting place: Cementerio El Encinal; Monterey, California
- Known for: Between Pacific Tides
- Scientific career
- Fields: Marine biology

Edward Flanders Robb Ricketts (May 14, 1897 – May 11, 1948) was an American marine biologist, ecologist, and philosopher. Renowned as the inspiration for the character Doc in John Steinbeck's 1945 novel Cannery Row, Rickett's professional reputation is rooted in Between Pacific Tides (1939), a pioneering study of intertidal ecology. A friend and mentor of Steinbeck, they collaborated on and co-authored the book Sea of Cortez (1941).

Eleven years later, and just three years after the death of Ed Ricketts, John Steinbeck reprinted the narrative portion of their coauthored book with a new publisher, with Steinbeck removing Ricketts as coauthor, adding a biography of Ed Ricketts and re-titling the book The Log from the Sea of Cortez (1946). Steinbeck also added a eulogy for Ricketts, but it was met with public backlash.

Gwyn Conger Steinbeck, the writer's second wife, thought highly of Ricketts. She said, "There was such a special magic about Ed Ricketts, and, in many ways he was John's offspring; he was the source of the Steinbeck Nile.

== Life ==
Ricketts was born in Chicago to Abbott Ricketts and Alice Beverly Flanders Ricketts. He had a younger sister Frances and a younger brother Thayer. His sister Frances (Ricketts) Strong said he had a mind like a dictionary and was often in trouble for correcting teachers and other adults. Ricketts spent most of his childhood in Chicago, except for a year in South Dakota when he was age 10.

After a year of college at Illinois State Normal University Ricketts then traveled to Texas and New Mexico. In 1918, he was drafted into the US Army Medical Corps. According to John Steinbeck, "In appearance and temperament Ed was a remarkably unmillitary man... [but] actually the exact opposite was true. He was a successful soldier".

After discharge from the army, Ricketts studied zoology at the University of Chicago. He was influenced by his professor W.C. Allee, a biologist and ecological theorist, who would go on to write a classic early textbook on ecology. Ricketts became a proponent of ecological thinking, in which man was only one part of a great chain of being, caught in a web of life too large for him to control or understand. However, he dropped out without taking a degree. He then spent several months walking through the American South, from Indiana to Florida. He used material from this trip to publish an article in Travel magazine titled "Vagabonding Through Dixie". He returned to Chicago and studied some more at the university.

In 1922, Ricketts met and married Anna "Nan" Barbara Makar, who was born to Croatian immigrants in 1900. In 1923, the couple had a son, Edward F. Ricketts, Jr. and moved to California to set up Pacific Biological Laboratories with Albert E. Galigher, a college friend of Ricketts' with whom he had run a similar business on a smaller scale. In 1924, Ricketts became sole owner of the lab, and soon two daughters were born: Nancy Jane on November 28, 1924, and Cornelia on April 6, 1928.

Between 1925 and 1927, Ricketts' sister Frances and both his parents moved to California; Frances and their father Abbott worked with Ricketts at the lab. In late 1930 Ricketts met aspiring writer John Steinbeck and his wife Carol, who had moved to Pacific Grove earlier in the year. For more than a year, Carol worked half-time for Ricketts at the lab until 1932 when Ricketts' wife Nan left, taking their two daughters, and Ricketts no longer had enough money to pay Carol's salary. Steinbeck also spent time at the lab, learning marine biology, helping Ricketts preserve specimens and talking about philosophy.

In 1936, Ricketts and Nan separated for good, and he lived in his lab. On November 25, 1936, a fire spread from the adjacent cannery and destroyed the lab. Ricketts lost nearly everything, including an extraordinary amount of correspondence, research notes, manuscripts, and his prized library, which had held everything from invaluable scientific resources to his beloved collection of poetry. However, the manuscript of Ricketts' textbook (with Jack Calvin) Between Pacific Tides had already been sent to the publisher. John Steinbeck became a silent 50% partner in the lab after he funded its reconstruction costs.

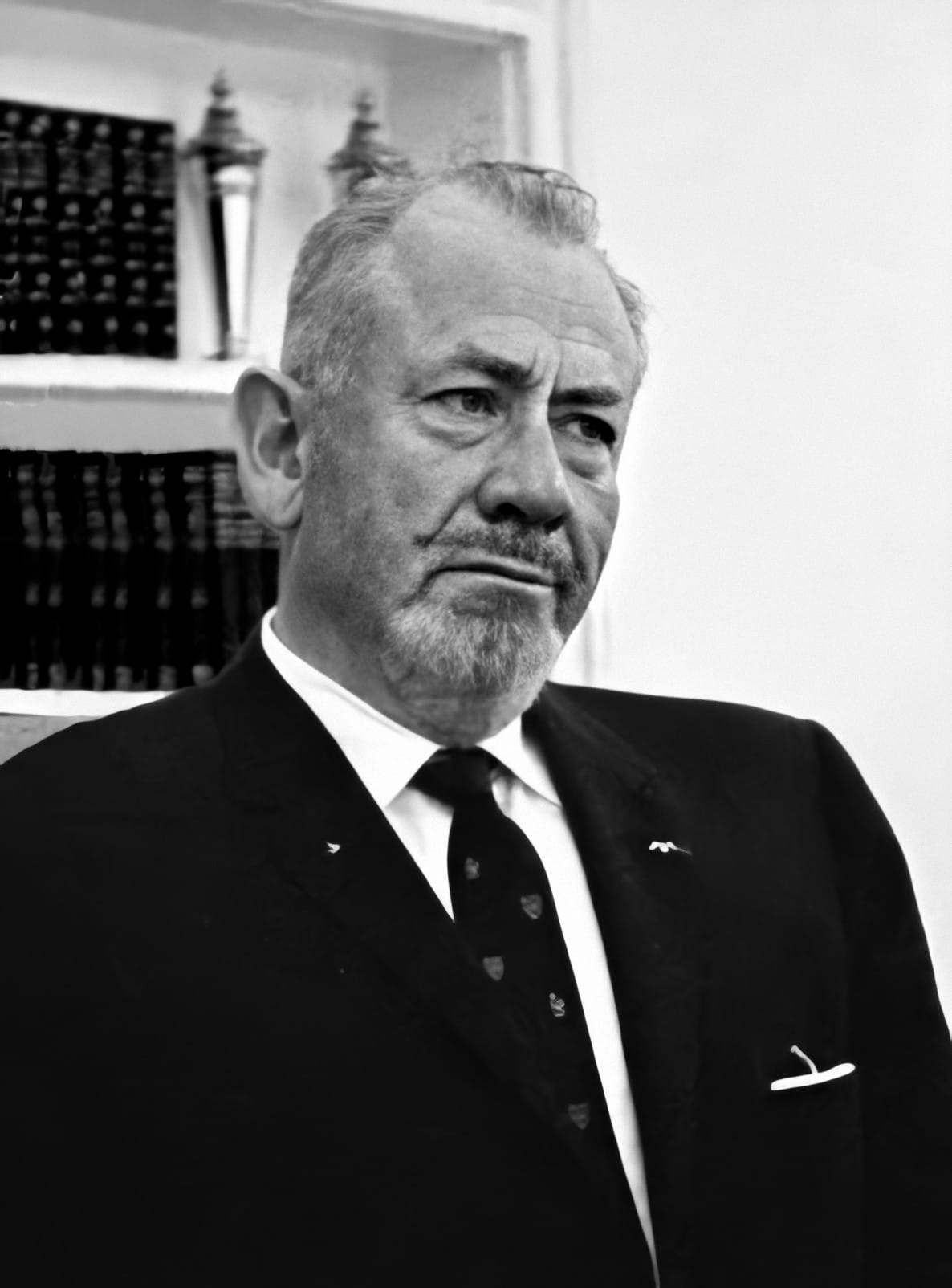
Steinbeck, late in life

In 1940, Ricketts journeyed to the Sea of Cortez (Gulf of California) in a chartered fishing boat named the Western Flyer with John Steinbeck, Carol, Steinbeck's wife, and four other crew members, to collect invertebrates for the scientific catalog in their book, Sea of Cortez. Also in 1940, Ricketts began a relationship with Eleanor Susan Brownell Anthony "Toni" Solomons Jackson, who became his common-law wife. As Steinbeck's secretary, Jackson helped edit The Log from the Sea of Cortez. Jackson, who had attended the University of California, Los Angeles, was the daughter of Katherine Gray Church and Theodore Solomons, an explorer and early member of the Sierra Club, who had discovered and defined the John Muir Trail. Jackson and her young daughter Katherine Adele moved in with Ricketts and lived with him until 1947. In addition to Steinbeck, their circle of friends included the novelist and painter Henry Miller and the mythologist, writer, and lecturer Joseph Campbell.

During World War II, Ricketts again served in the Army, this time as a medical lab technician; he was drafted in October 1942, missing the age cut-off by days. During his service, he kept collecting marine life and compiling data. His son was drafted in 1943.

In 1945, Steinbeck's novel Cannery Row was published, making Ricketts, the model for "Doc", a celebrity, and tourists and journalists began seeking him out. "Doc" is an intellectual who was somewhat outcast from intellectual circles, a party-loving drinking man, in close touch with the working class, prostitutes, and bums of Monterey's Cannery Row. Steinbeck wrote that "[Doc] wears a beard and his face is half Christ and half satyr and his face tells the truth."

Ricketts himself read Cannery Row with exasperation, but ended saying simply that it could not be criticized because it had not been written with malice. Ricketts also inspired "Doc" in Sweet Thursday, the sequel to Cannery Row; "Friend Ed" in Burning Bright; "Doc Burton" in In Dubious Battle; Jim Casy in The Grapes of Wrath; and "Doctor Winter" in The Moon Is Down.

In September 1946, Ricketts' daughter Nancy Jane had a son, making Ricketts a grandfather. That same year, the health of his stepdaughter Kay deteriorated due to a brain tumor; she died the following year on October 5, 1947. Kay's mother, Toni left Ricketts shortly after this death. Just a few weeks later, Ricketts met Alice Campbell, a music and philosophy student half his age. They "married" in early 1948, but the marriage was not valid because Ricketts never had a legal divorce from Nan.

In March 1948 in New York City, Toni Jackson married Dr Benjamin Elazari Volcani, a renowned microbiologist she had met while he was working with the famous microbiologist C. B. van Niel (a student of Albert Kluyver's) at Stanford University's Hopkins Marine Station in Monterey in 1943.

In 1948, Ricketts and Steinbeck planned together to go to British Columbia and write the book The Outer Shores about the marine life north toward Alaska. On previous trips Ricketts had done most of the needed research and he gave Steinbeck the typescripts for these as he had done previously with The Sea of Cortez.

A week before the planned expedition, on May 8, 1948, as Ricketts was driving across the railroad tracks at Drake Avenue, just uphill from Cannery Row, on his way to dinner after his day's work, a Del Monte Express passenger train hit his car. He lived for three days, conscious at least some of the time, before dying on May 11.

A life-size bust of Ricketts has been erected at the site of the long-defunct rail crossing to serve as a commemoration. Passers-by often pick nearby flowers and place them in the statue's hand. Also at the crossing are derelict crossbucks marking the site of the accident.

== Lab ==
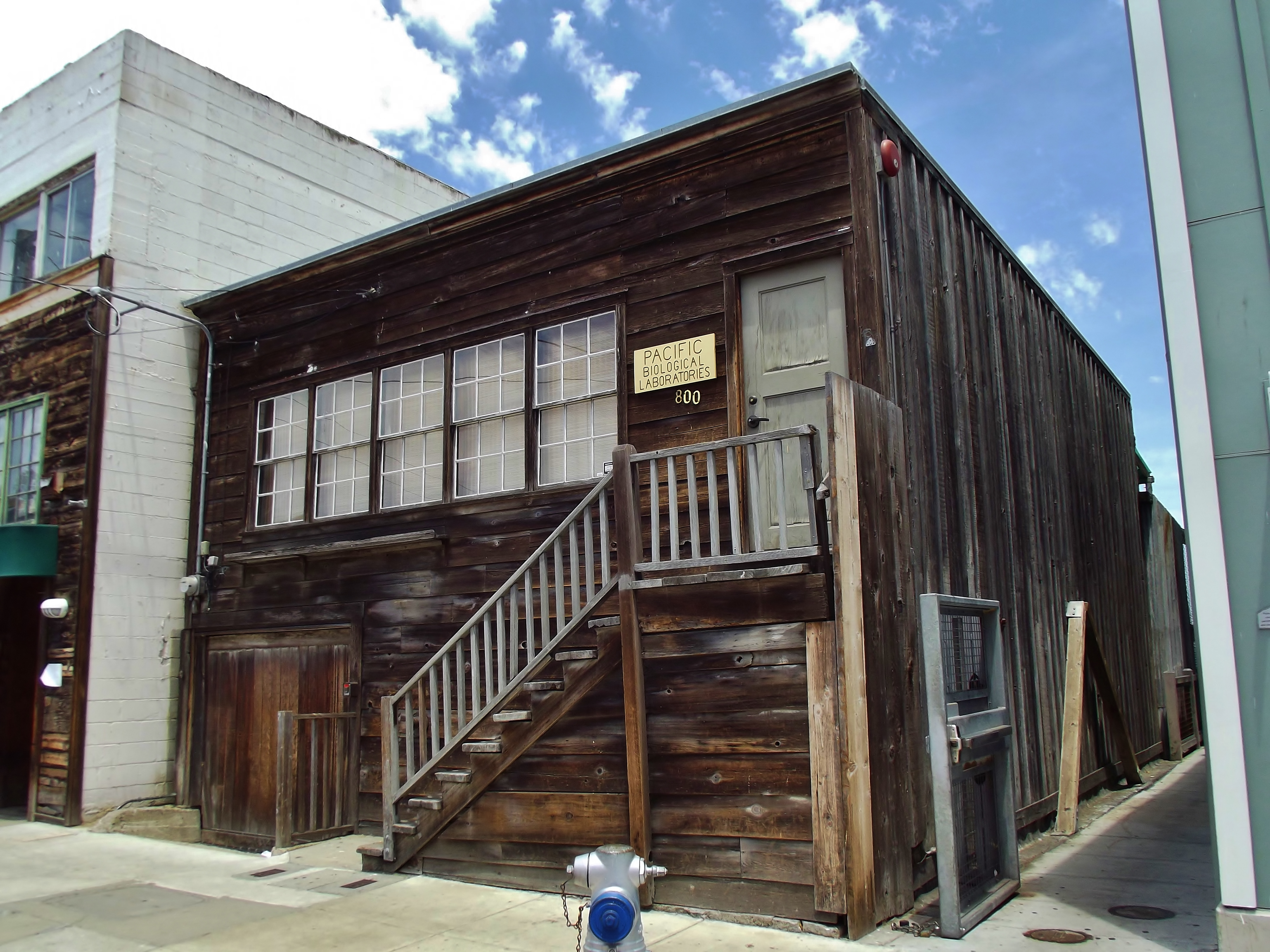
Ricketts' lab at 800 Cannery Row

In 1923, Ed Ricketts and his business partner Albert Galigher started Pacific Biological Laboratories (PBL), a marine biology supply house. The lab was in Pacific Grove at 165 Fountain Avenue. The business moved to 740 Ocean View Avenue, Monterey, California, with Ricketts as sole owner. Today, this location is 800 Cannery Row.

On November 25, 1936, a fire broke out at the Del Mar Cannery next to the lab. Most of the laboratory's contents were destroyed. The typescript of 'Between Pacific Tides', which Stanford University was preparing for publication, survived. With an investment from John Steinbeck, who became silent partner and 50% owner of the business, Ricketts rebuilt the lab using the original floorplan.

Ricketts' lab on Cannery Row had attracted visitors who ran the gamut from writers, artists, and musicians to prostitutes and bums. Gatherings often included discussions of philosophy, science, and art, and sometimes developed into parties that continued for days. Participants in meetings had included Steinbeck, Bruce Ariss, Joseph Campbell (who had worked at the lab as Ricketts' assistant), Adelle Davis, Henry Miller, Lincoln Steffens and Francis Whitaker. Amid the tumult of commercial activity and tourist attractions that Cannery Row has become in recent decades, the modest and mostly unnoticed and unmarked lab stands as a silent witness to the bygone era celebrated in Steinbeck's work.

Ricketts' laboratory business was fictionalized in Steinbeck's Cannery Row as "Western Biological Laboratories."

Steinbeck was inspired to write The Pearl after visiting La Paz, Baja California Sur with Ricketts on their Sea of Cortez expedition.

== Philosophy ==
In addition to his writings on marine life, Ricketts wrote three philosophical essays; he continued to revise them over the years, integrating new ideas in response to feedback from Campbell, Miller, and other friends. The first essay lays out his idea of "nonteleological thinking" – a way of viewing things as they are, rather than seeking explanations for them. In his second essay, "The Spiritual Morphology of Poetry," he proposed four progressive classes of poetry, from naive to transcendent, and assigned famous poets from Keats to Whitman to these categories. The third essay, "The Philosophy of 'Breaking Through'," explores transcendence throughout the arts and describes his own moments of 'breaking through', such as his first hearing of Madame Butterfly.

According to his letters, conversations with composer John Cage helped Ricketts clarify some of his thoughts on poetry, and gave him new insight into the emphasis on form over content embraced by many modern artists.

Even though Steinbeck presented the essays to various publishers on behalf of Ricketts, only one was ever published in his lifetime: the first essay appears (without attribution) in a chapter titled "Non-Teleological Thinking" in The Log from the Sea of Cortez. All of his major essays, along with other shorter works were published in The Outer Shores, vols. 1 and 2, edited by Joel Hedgpeth, and with additional biographical commentary also by Hedgpeth. Much of this material appears in Katharine Rodger's book, Breaking Through: Essays, Journals, and Travelogues of Edward F. Ricketts (2006).

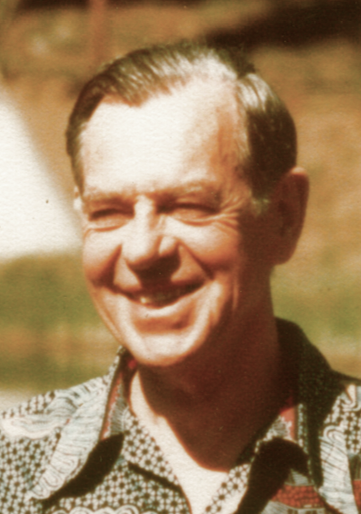
Joseph Campbell worked for a while as Ricketts' assistant

In the 1930s and 1940s, Ricketts strongly influenced many of Steinbeck's writings. The biologist inspired a number of notable characters in Steinbeck's novels, and ecological themes recur in them. Ricketts' biographer Eric Enno Tamm notes that, except for East of Eden (1952), Steinbeck's writing declined after Ricketts' death in 1948.

Ricketts also influenced the mythologist Joseph Campbell. It was an important period in the development of Campbell's thinking about the epic journey of "the hero with a thousand faces." Campbell lived for a while next door to Ricketts, participated in professional and social activities at his neighbor's, and accompanied him, along with Xenia and Sasha Kashevaroff, on a 1932 journey to Juneau, Alaska on the Grampus. Like Steinbeck, Campbell played with a novel written with Ricketts as hero, but unlike Steinbeck, Campbell didn't complete the book. Bruce Robison writes that "Campbell would refer to those days as a time when everything in his life was taking shape...Campbell, the great chronicler of the "hero's journey" in mythology, recognized patterns that paralleled his own thinking in one of Ricketts's unpublished philosophical essays. Echoes of Carl Jung, Robinson Jeffers and James Joyce can be found in the work of Steinbeck and Ricketts as well as Campbell."

Henry Miller wrote about Ricketts in his book The Air-Conditioned Nightmare: "[Ed Ricketts is] a most exceptional individual in character and temperament, a man radiating peace, joy and wisdom," and said that Ricketts was, apart from L.C. Powell, the only person he knew who was "satisfied with his lot, adjusted to his environment, happy in his work, and representative of all that is best in the American tradition."

== Ecology ==
In Ricketts' day, ecology was early in its development. Now-common concepts such as habitat, niche, succession, predator-prey relationships, and food chains were not yet mature ideas. Ricketts was among a few marine biologists who studied intertidal organisms in an ecological context.

His first major scientific work — now regarded as a classic in marine ecology, and in its fifth edition — was Between Pacific Tides, published in 1939, co-authored with Jack Calvin. The third and fourth editions were revised by Joel Hedgpeth, a contemporary of Ricketts and Steinbeck; Hedgpeth continued the book's taxonomic excellence while retaining its ecological approach.

The pioneering nature of Ricketts' book may be appreciated by comparison with another classic work, now in its fourth edition, that was published two years later, in 1941: Light's Manual by S. F. Light of the University of California, Berkeley. Light's Manual is technical, difficult for laymen, but essential for specialists. On the other hand, Ricketts' Between Pacific Tides is readable, full of observations and side comments, and readily accessible to anyone with a genuine interest in seashore life. It cannot serve as a thorough manual to marine invertebrates, but it addresses the common and conspicuous animals in a style that invites and educates newcomers and offers substantial information for experienced biologists. It is not organized according to taxonomic classification, but instead by habitat. Thus, crabs are not all treated in the same chapter; crabs of the rocky shore, high in the intertidal, are in a separate section from crabs of lower intertidal zones or sandy beaches.

Some concepts that Ricketts used in Between Pacific Tides were novel then and ignored by some in academia. Ricketts, writes Bruce Robison of the Monterey Bay Aquarium Research Institute, "was 'a lone, largely marginalized scientist' with no university degrees, and he had to struggle... against... traditionalists" to get the book published by Stanford University Press.

Ricketts' book Sea of Cortez is almost two separate books. The first section is a narrative, co-written by Steinbeck and Ricketts (Ricketts kept a daily journal during the expedition; Steinbeck edited the journal into the narrative section of the book). Later, the narrative was published alone as The Log from the Sea of Cortez, without Ricketts's name. The remainder of the book, about 300 pages, is an "Annotated Phyletic Catalog" of specimens collected. This section was Ricketts' work alone. It was presented in the traditional taxonomic arrangement, but with numerous notes on ecological observations.

Ricketts pursued pathfinding studies in quantitative ecology, analyzing the Monterey sardine fishery. In a 1947 article in the Monterey Peninsula Herald, he documented sardine harvests, described sardine ecology, and noted that harvests were declining as fishing intensity increased. When the sardines became depleted and the industry was destroyed, Ricketts explained what had happened to the sardines: "They're in cans."

The research Ricketts did on sardines was an application of ecology to fisheries science, but it was not published as an academic paper. He is not widely recognized by fisheries scientists. The prominent fisheries scientist Daniel Pauly comments: "That's probably due to the fact that his stuff isn't widely available... This is strange, but fisheries scientists so far as they are trained do extraordinarily little ecology... I will not publish a paper on pelagics without now mentioning Ricketts".

The Monterey Bay Aquarium Research Institute deploys a four kilometer depth rated remotely operated vehicle named in honor of Ricketts's work, the ROV Doc Ricketts.

== Eponymous species ==
Since 1930, over 16 species have been named after Ricketts:

- Aclesia rickettsi (Sea slug)
- Catriona rickettsi (Sea slug)
- Hypsoblenniops rickettsi (Blenny)
- Longiprostatum rickettsi (Flatworm)
- Mysidium rickettsi (Opossum shrimp)
- Siphonides rickettsi (Peanut worm)
- Nephtys rickettsi (Polychaete worm)
- Mesochaetopterus rickettsi (Polychaete worm)
- Polydora rickettsi Woodwick 1961 (Polychaete worm)
- Panoploea rickettsi (Sand flea)
- Pentactinia rickettsi (Sea anemone)
- Palythoa rickettsi (Zoanthid)
- Isometridium rickettsi (Sea anemone)
- Pycnogonum rickettsi Schmitt, 1934 (Sea spider)
- Asbestopluma rickettsi Lundsten et al., 2014 (Sea sponge)
- Poecillastra rickettsi (Sea sponge)
- Acorylus rickettsi Coan & Valentich-Scott, 2010 (Clam)

== Other eponyms ==
- Ricketts Bar MX in San Jose del Cabo, Baja California Sur, Mexico is named for him and features Bryant Fitch's photograph over the bar.
- Doc Ricketts is the name of a robotic undersea rover operated by the Monterey Bay Aquarium Research Institute. The 12-foot-long (3.6 m), 10,000-pound (4,500 kg) submersible has explored the depths of Monterey Bay.

== Sources ==
- Astro, Richard. (1973). John Steinbeck and Edward F. Ricketts: the Shaping of a Novelist. University of Minnesota Press. ISBN 0-8166-0704-4
- Astro, Richard. (1976). Edward F. Ricketts. Western Writers Series No 21. Boise State Univ. ISBN 0-88430-020-X
- Benson, Jackson J., "John Steinbeck, Writer", Penguin Putnam Inc., NYC, 1990, ISBN 9780140144178
- Lannoo, Michael J. Leopold's Shack and Ricketts's Lab: The Emergence of Environmentalism (University of California Press; 2010) 196 pages; a combined study of Aldo Leopold and Ed Ricketts as major and parallel influences on environmentalism.
- Ricketts, Edward F. and Jack Calvin. (1939). Between Pacific Tides. Stanford University Press; 5th/Rev edition. 1992. ISBN 0-8047-2068-1
- Ricketts, Edward Flanders. Hedgpeth, Joel W. (ed). (1978). Outer Shores. Mad River Press. ISBN 0-916422-13-5
- Ricketts, Edward Flanders. Hedgpeth, Joel W. (ed). (1979). Outer Shores 2: Breaking Through. Mad River Press. ISBN 0-916422-14-3
- Ricketts, Edward Flanders. Rodger, Katharine A. (2003). Renaissance Man of Cannery Row: The Life and Letters of Edward F. Ricketts. University of Alabama Press. ISBN 0-8173-5087-X
- Robison, Bruce, "Mavericks on Cannery Row," American Scientist, vol. 92, no. 6 (November–December 2004, p. 1: a review of Eric Enno Tamm, Beyond the Outer Shores: The Untold Odyssey of Ed Ricketts, the Pioneering Ecologist who Inspired John Steinbeck and Joseph Campbell, Four Walls Eight Windows, 2004.
- Smith, R.I. and J. T. Carlton. 1975. Light's Manual: Intertidal Invertebrates of the Central California Coast. University of California Press. ISBN 0-520-02113-4
- Steinbeck, John. Ricketts, Edward F. (1941). Sea of Cortez: A leisurely journal of travel and research, with a scientific appendix comprising materials for a source book on the marine animals of the Panamic faunal province. Reprinted by Paul P Appel Pub. 1971. ISBN 0-911858-08-3
- Steinbeck, John. Shillinglaw, Susan (intro). (1994). Cannery Row. Penguin Classics; Reprint edition. ISBN 0-14-018737-5
- Steinbeck, John. Astro, Richard (intro). (1995). The Log from the Sea of Cortez. Penguin Classics; Reprint edition. ISBN 0-14-018744-8
- Tamm, Eric Enno (2005) Beyond the Outer Shores: The Untold Odyssey of Ed Ricketts, the Pioneering Ecologist who Inspired John Steinbeck and Joseph Campbell, Thunder's Mouth Press. ISBN 978-1-56025-689-2.
- Tamm, Eric Enno (2005). Beyond the Outer Shores: The Untold Odyssey of Ed Ricketts, the Pioneering Ecologist who Inspired John Steinbeck and Joseph Campbell. New York: Da Capo Press. ISBN 978-1-56025-689-2.
- Winnett, Thomas; Morey, Kathy (2001). Guide to the John Muir Trail (Third ed.). Berkeley, CA: Wilderness Press. ISBN 978-0-89997-221-3.
