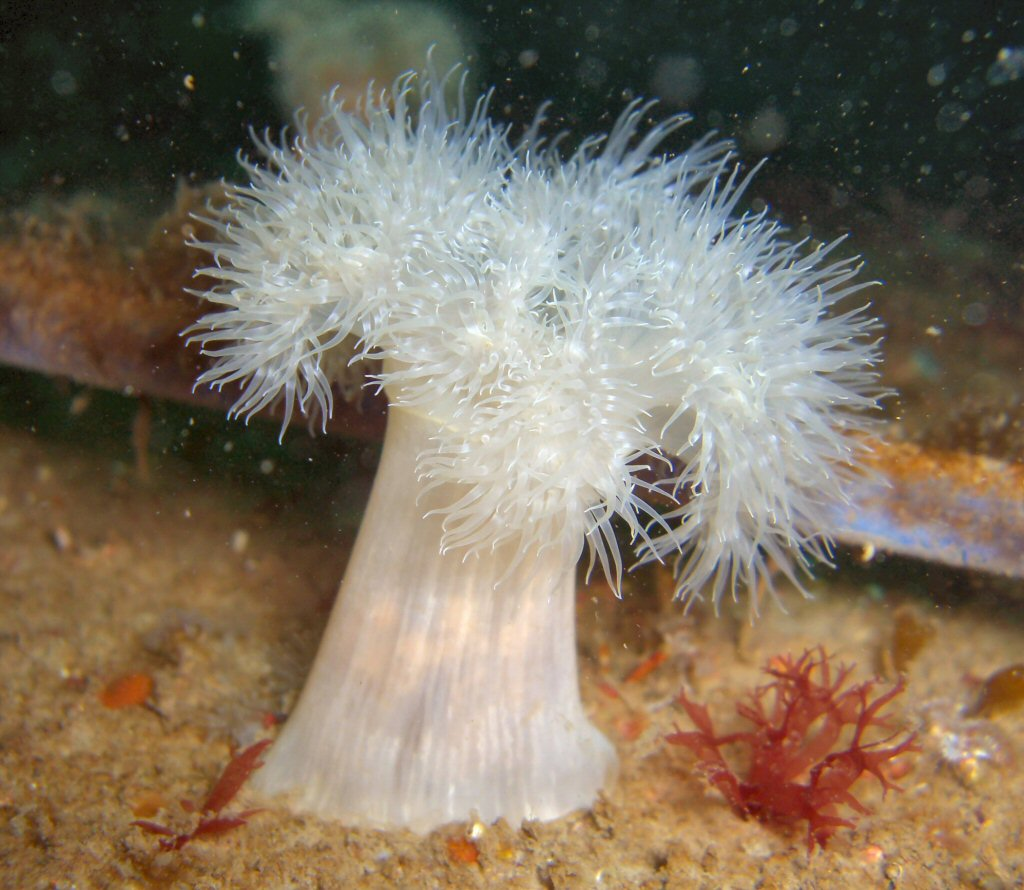

Scientific classification
- Kingdom: Animalia
- Phylum: Cnidaria
- Subphylum: Anthozoa
- Class: Hexacorallia
- Order: Actiniaria
- Family: Metridiidae
- Genus: Metridium
- Species: M. dianthus

Binomial name
- Metridium dianthus (Ellis, 1768)

Synonyms
- Actinia aurantiaca Jordan, 1855; Actinia dianthus Ellis, 1768; Actinia felina Linnaeus, 1767; Actinia marginata Le Sueur, 1817; Actinia pentapetala Pennant; Actinia plumosa; Actiniloba dianthus de Blainville, 1830; Cribrina plumosa Ehrenberg; Metridium fimbriatum Verrill, 1865; Metridium marginatum Milne-Edwards; Metridium plumosa; Sagartia dianthus

= Metridium dianthus =

Species of sea anemone

Metridium dianthus is a species of sea anemone in the family Metridiidae. It is found in the northern Atlantic Ocean (including the coasts of the British Isles) and in the northeast Pacific Ocean. There is also a record from South Africa, possible resulting from an introduction.

== Description ==
This is the largest sea anemone in the northeastern Atlantic; the smooth column can be 30 cm (12 in) in height with a pedal disc wider than this. This form is known as "dianthus" and on a large specimen, the oral disc may have a plume of several thousand tentacles some 15 cm (6 in) across, often forming several lobes. A smaller form, found most often in brackish water, is known as "pallidus" and may have two hundred tentacles and be 2.5 cm (1 in) across.

== Distribution and habitat ==
Metridium dianthus is an adaptable, circumboreal species in the Northern Hemisphere. In the eastern Atlantic, its range extends from the Kola Peninsula in northern Russia to the Bay of Biscay, in the western Atlantic from the Arctic Circle to Delaware, and it also occurs in the northeastern Pacific. It is also present in certain locations where it has probably been introduced, including Patagonia, the Falkland Islands, South Africa and Japan. It occurs at depths down to about 100 m (330 ft), on rocks, in caves, on pebbles, on molluscs such as mussels, on wharves and jetties, on floating objects, nets and ropes. It tolerates temperatures between −1 and 20 °C (30 and 68 °F) and a range of salinities.

== Ecology ==
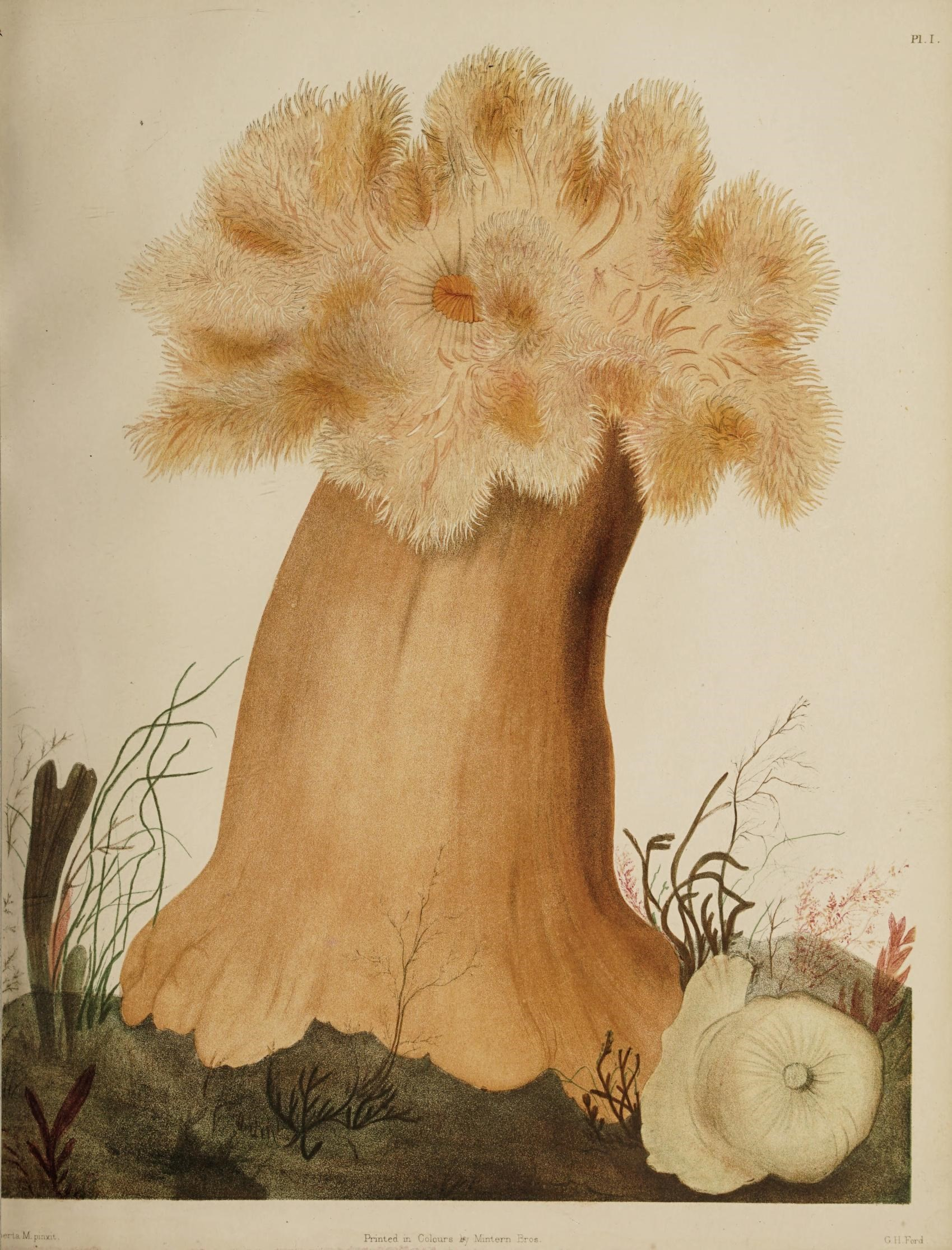
Metridium dianthus illustration.

Metridium dianthus is a suspension feeder, spreading its plume of tentacles and catching small organisms as they float past. These include the eggs and larvae of molluscs, polychaetes, ascidians, amphipods, copepods, barnacles, shrimps and other crustaceans, as well as foraminifera and diatoms. When there is either too strong a current, or very little water movement, it can retract both the plume of tentacles and the column.

The sexes are separate in this species and, in Scotland, spawning takes place in June and July. Batches of eggs are emitted by the female at intervals of two to ten days, not through the siphonoglyphs, as might be expected, but through slits in the body wall known as cinclides. The eggs sink to the seabed and are fertilised in the water column. The planula larvae are planktonic, before sinking to the seabed and undergoing metamorphosis into juveniles.
