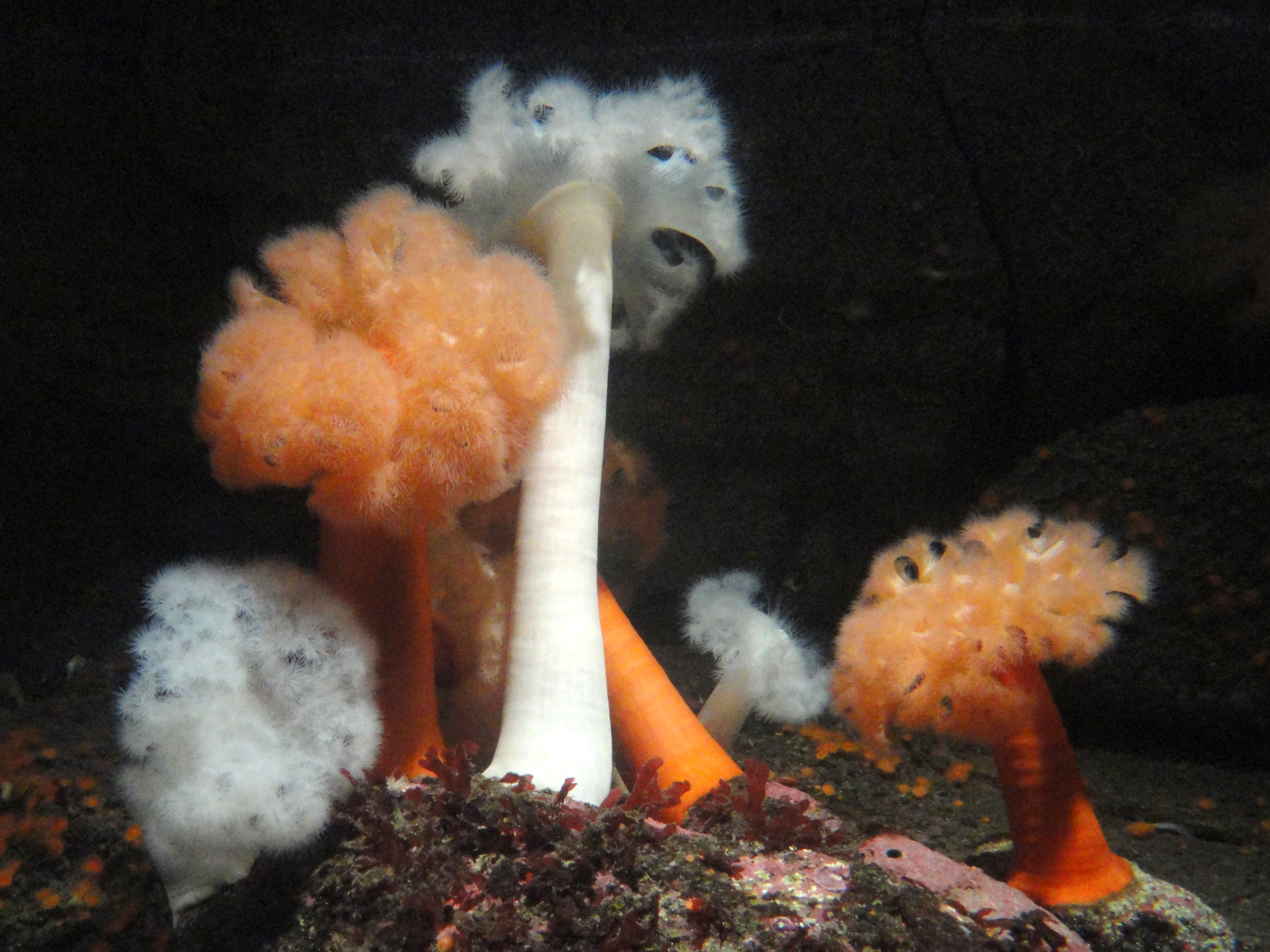
- Giant plumose anemone (Metridium farcimen) at the Monterey Bay Aquarium

Scientific classification
- Kingdom: Animalia
- Phylum: Cnidaria
- Subphylum: Anthozoa
- Class: Hexacorallia
- Order: Actiniaria
- Family: Metridiidae
- Genus: Metridium
- Species: M. farcimen

Binomial name
- Metridium farcimen (Brandt, 1835)

Synonyms
- Actinia farcimen Brandt, 1835; Actinia priapus Brandt, 1835; Actinia priapus Tilesius, 1809; Dendractis priapus Tilesius, 1809; Heliactis farcimen (Brandt, 1835); Isometridium rickettsi Carlgren, 1951; Metridium giganteum Fautin, Bucklin & Hand, 1990

= Metridium farcimen =

Giant plumose anemone

Species of sea anemone

Metridium farcimen is a species of sea anemone in the family Metridiidae. It is commonly known as the giant plumose anemone or white-plumed anemone. It is found in the eastern Pacific Ocean from Alaska down to Catalina Island, California.

== Taxonomy ==
In 1990, Fautin et al. examined the validity of the name Metridium giganteum. A further study in 2000 concluded that Actinia priapus; Tilesius, 1809, Actinia farcimen; Brandt, 1835, and Isometridium rickettsi; Carlgren, 1949 were all synonyms of Metridium giganteum. Of these, Actinia farcimen was the name first published. It is, however, a junior homonym so the valid name for the species is Metridium farcimen; (Brandt, 1835).

== Description ==
Metridium farcimen is a large sea anemone, occasionally reaching a height of one metre (39 in) when fully extended. More usually it is 50 cm (20 in) or less in height but is very variable in shape. It can retract its tentacles and form a ball up to 25 cm (10 in) in diameter. The column is slender, smooth and studded with acontia. These are openings through which thread-like nematocysts from inside the body wall can protrude. There are no tubercles and the column is topped by a parapet. The oral disc is lobed and deeply convoluted at the edge and bears well over 100 fine, short, tapering tentacles. The colour is generally opaque white, but orange, salmon and brown specimens sometimes occur. Large specimens have been seen to have long, thick, fighting tentacles, used to drive away other anemones trying to settle too close. Some individuals on the edge of large colonies have several of these fighting tentacles on their lips, which they use to repel non-clonal anemones. These colonies emanate from one individual through cloning. Metridium farcimen might be confused with Metridium dianthus which occupies the same habitat and has a similar colour and form, but that species seldom exceeds 10 cm (4 in) in height, has fewer than 100 tentacles and has an unlobed oral disc.

== Distribution ==
Metridium farcimen is found on the western seaboard of the United States and Canada. Its range extends from Alaska southwards to California. It is at its most common in Puget Sound and around Vancouver Island. It is found in the sublittoral zone on rocks, mollusc shells, pilings, docks and other man-made structures and even in polluted waters. It is also found at great depths, near hydrothermal vents, cold water seeps and decomposing whale carcasses on the seabed.

(video) White-plumed anemone

== Biology ==
Metridium farcimen is a carnivore. It captures small invertebrates, zooplankton and other food particles with the nematocysts on its tentacles and thrusts them into the mouth in the centre of its oral disc. A study released in June 2021 found that these large anemones consume land-dwelling insects and ostracods.

Large anemones have few predators but smaller specimens are eaten by the sea stars, Pisaster spp., and by various nudibranchs. The starfish, Dermasterias imbricata, has been observed feeding on larger anemones in Puget Sound.

Reproduction takes place with the liberation of eggs and sperm from the gonads embedded in the body wall which are then ejected through the mouth. Fertilised eggs develop into planula larvae. After several moults, these settle and metamorphose into polyps. Metridium farcimen occurs as solitary individuals or as congregations of genetically distinct individuals and does not replicate asexually (Bucklin, 1987a). Individuals can live for many years.
