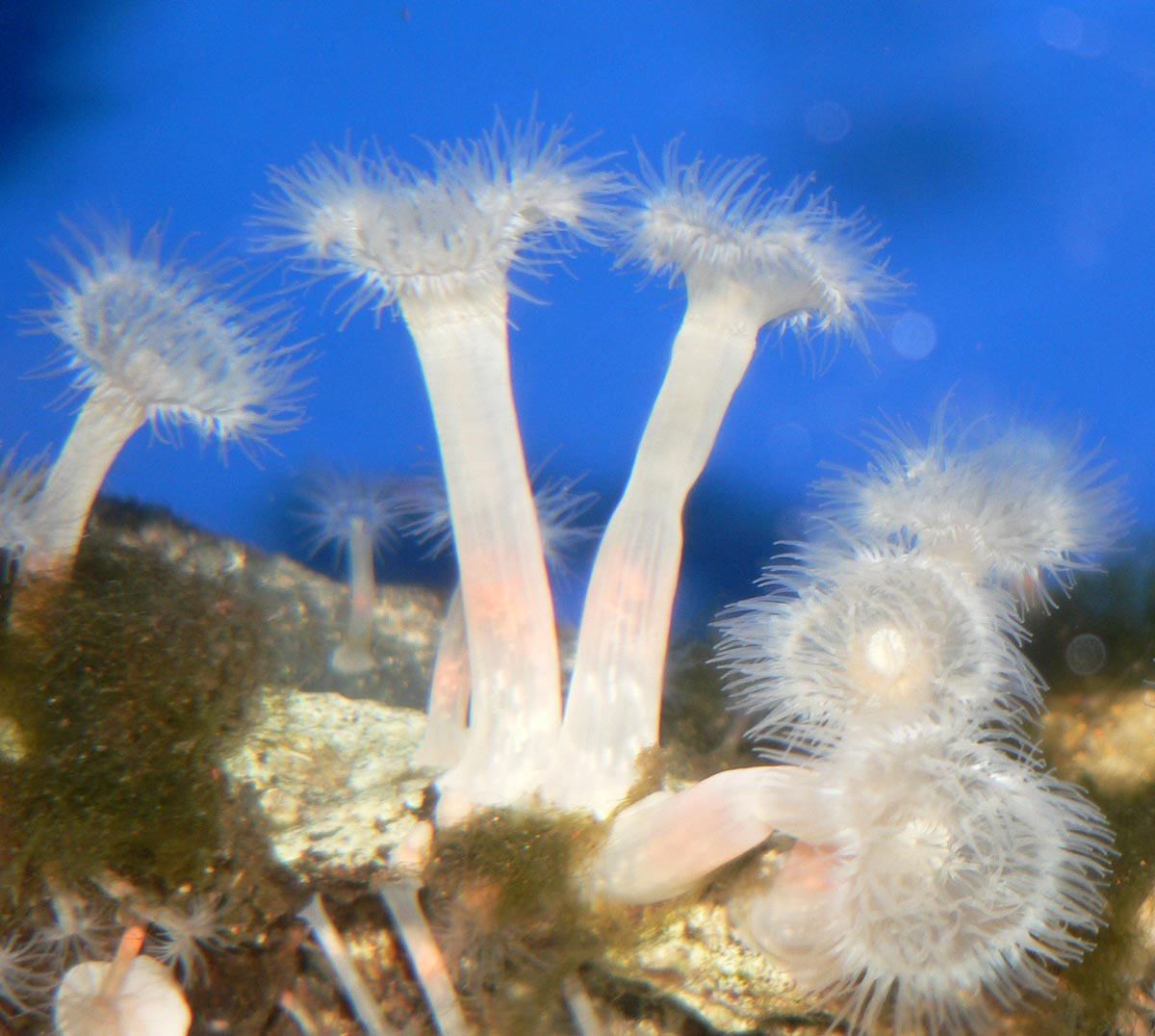
- Several young plumose anemones

Scientific classification
- Kingdom: Animalia
- Phylum: Cnidaria
- Subphylum: Anthozoa
- Class: Hexacorallia
- Order: Actiniaria
- Family: Metridiidae
- Genus: Metridium
- Species: M. senile

Binomial name
- Metridium senile (Linnaeus, 1761)

Synonyms
- List: Actinia plumosa; Actinia candida Müller, 1776; Actinia cereus Müller, 1776; Actinia marginata ambrea; Actinia marginata salmonea; Actinia pallida Holdsworth, 1855; Actinia pellucida Alder, 1858; Actinia rufa Müller, 1776; Actinia senilis Linnaeus, 1767; Actinoloba dianthus de Blainville, 1830; Actinoloba marginata Les.; Actinothoe pallida Holdsworth; Anthea plumosa; Metridium dianthus sindonea Gosse; Metridium fimbriatum Verrill, 1865; Metridium pallidum (Holdsworth, 1855); Metridium senilis Linnaeus, 1761; Paraisometridium pehuense Zamponi, 1978; Paraisometridium pehuensis Zamponi, 1978; Priapus senilis Linnaeus, 1761; Sagartia pallida Holdsworth; Sagartia pura (Alder, 1858); Thoe pura Wright, 1859

= Metridium senile =

Species of sea anemone

Metridium senile, the Plumose, Fluffy, or Frilled anemone, is a species of sea anemone in the family Metridiidae. As a member of the genus Metridium, it is a type of plumose anemone and is found in the seas off north-western Europe and both the east and west coasts of North America.

== Description ==
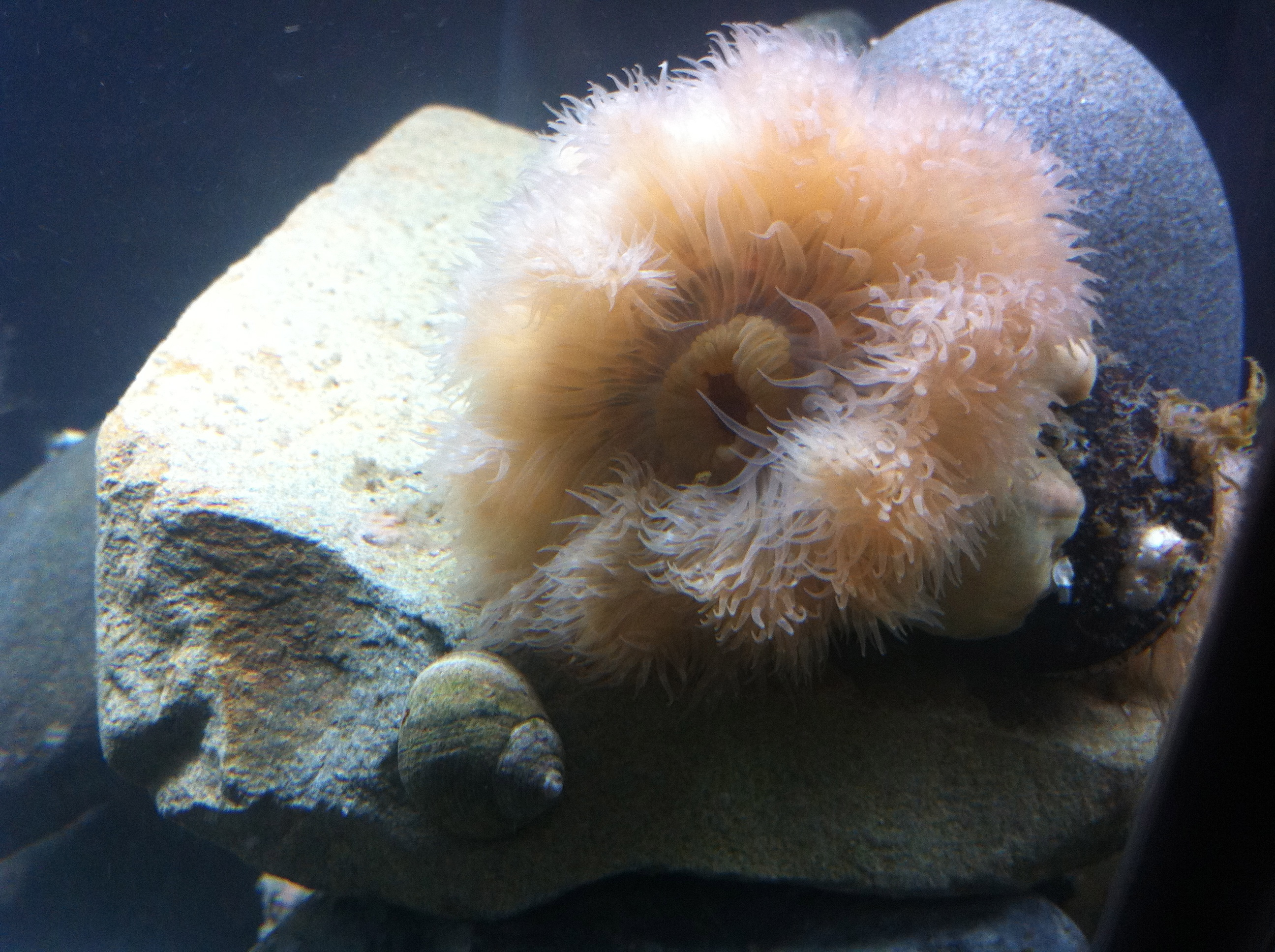
A view of the interior of Metridium senile at Maria Mitchell Aquarium on Nantucket; notice the tentacles surrounding the central mouth.

The base of Metridium senile is considerably wider than the column and is attached to rock or another substrate. The column is long, smooth and cylindrical, of a fleshy consistency with a slimy surface lubricated with mucus. There are no warts or suckers and the column is topped by a parapet and deep groove. The oral disc is broad and deeply lobed into several curving sections that overhang the column. The slender, pointed tentacles are very numerous in larger specimens though fewer and relatively longer in smaller ones. Those near the margin are crowded and short whereas further into the disc they are longer and more dispersed. The colour range of this sea anemone is large but for any one specimen the colour is uniform throughout, except for the orange-red lip surrounding the central mouth. Colours include, white, cream, pink, orange, red, grey, brown and olive-green. The tentacles are translucent but may have a white band, and some specimens have a darker column and much paler disc.

There are several distinct forms and various intermediate ones. M. senile var. dianthus is described above. It has over 1000 tentacles and exhibits a feathery appearance. It can grow to 30 cm (12 in) tall with a base diameter of 15 cm (6 in) and a similar tentacle span. M. senile var. pallidus is much smaller, seldom exceeding 2.5 cm (1 in) base diameter, and has a much less convoluted disc with fewer than 200 tentacles. It seems to be a dwarf race, becoming sexually mature while still small. There are also a number of intermediate forms.

Johannes Peter Müller has described the variety dianthus as "the most beautiful of all the anemones". It is indeed an impressive sight with the tentacles fully expanded, resembling a palm tree, but when retracted it can become a low, irregularly shaped, jelly-like disc of unattractive appearance. When exposed to the air by a retreating tide, it does not always retract but may hang under an overhang in a limp fashion looking like a wet glove with a single drop of water dangling at its tip.

== Distribution ==
M. senile is found on the northwest coasts of Europe from the Bay of Biscay north to Norway and Iceland. It also occurs on the east and west coasts of North America and has arrived in South African waters. It is found on the lower shore and the neritic zone at depths down to about 100 m (328 ft).

== Habitat ==
M. senile adheres to rocks, boulders, man-made structures, pebbles and shells. It favours places where the current is strong. Smaller forms inhabit the lower shore where they are found under stones, beneath overhangs and in shaded places. It specially favours soft rocks, honeycombed by molluscs, and the underside of large boulders. At greater depths, the larger forms are sometimes abundant on pilings, submerged pipes, pier supports and harbour walls. In the English Channel the anemones are often brought up when trawling in shallow waters for oysters and scallops. One oyster was found to have twenty anemones crowded onto its shell.

== Biology ==
M. senile is a predator and catches small organisms floating past in the current. Its diet largely consists of copepods, worm larvae, mollusc larvae, ascidian larvae, amphipods and barnacle larvae. There are reports of the sea anemone itself being eaten by the sea slug Aeolidia papillosa ("shag rug nudibranch"), the sea spider, Pycnogonum littorale, wentletrap sea snails Epitonium spp., the flounder, Pseudopleuronectes americanus and the black bream, Spondyliosoma cantharus.

M. senile is a protandric hermaphrodite – it starts life as a male and changes to be female when it gets older. Eggs or sperm develop in the gonads embedded in the mesentery that lines the coelom. They are ejected through the mouth, and when fertilised develop into planula larvae. After one to six months drifting in the plankton, these settle and metamorphose into juveniles. By this means the plume anemone can spread to new areas some way from its origins.

The plumose anemone can also increase its numbers by asexual reproduction. An individual can undergo binary fission by splitting in half and growing into two organisms. Or it can develop buds which grow into new individuals before becoming detached. Fragmentation, also known as basal laceration, is another mechanism by which the number of individuals can be increased rapidly. In an aquarium, the anemone can sometimes be seen to glide across a hard surface such as the glass wall, leaving fragments behind in the process. After a week or more, each piece can be seen to be developing a disc and tentacles and in due course grows into a new individual.

In 1856, in Torbay, England, a waterlogged board was brought to the surface by a dredger. It was found to have over 400 individuals of M. senile of varying sizes living on it. Those on one side were all white while the other side housed only individuals that were orange. The naturalist Philip Henry Gosse, writing about this, surmised that each side housed individuals resulting from the fragmentation of a single original individual that had settled on the board.

The growth rate of this species is rapid. Juveniles have been found to increase the diameter of their bases by 0.6 to 0.8 mm per day. By the age of 5 months, they have been found to reach an average basal diameter of 45 mm (2 in).
