= Between Pacific Tides =

1939 book by Edward F. Ricketts and Jack Calvin

- Jacket Cover for the third edition of 1952
- Author: Edward F. Ricketts, Jack Calvin
- Original title: Between Pacific Tides: An Account of the Habits and Habitats of Some Five Hundred of the Common, Conspicuous Seashore Invertebrates of the Pacific Coast Between Sitka, Alaska, and Northern Mexico
- Illustrator: Ritchie Lovejoy
- Cover artist: Ritchie Lovejoy
- Language: English
- Subject: Natural History of Marine Animals
- Genre: Non-fiction
- Publisher: Stanford University Press
- Publication date: 1939
- Publication place: United States
- Media type: Print

Between Pacific Tides is a 1939 book by Edward F. Ricketts and Jack Calvin that describes the intertidal ecology of the Pacific coast of the United States, Canada, and Mexico. The book was originally titled "Between Pacific Tides: An Account of the Habits and Habitats of Some Five Hundred of the Common, Conspicuous Seashore Invertebrates of the Pacific Coast Between Sitka, Alaska, and Northern Mexico".

Prior to Ricketts' work, the standard descriptive text of intertidal species of the Pacific was Seashore Animals of the Pacific Coast jointly coauthored by Myrtle E. Johnson and Harry James Snook, published in 1927 (reprinted 1935, 1952, 1967, 1980).

Between Pacific Tides was out of print from 1942 to 1948, but it has since been revised and updated to keep it current, and is now in its fifth edition with the size increasing around twenty percent from the original. Updated and expanded sections have been added since the original edition was published, including: John Steinbeck's Foreword to the 1948 edition; a new chapter regarding the influence on the distribution of shore organisms; an updated Annotated Systematic Index and General Bibliography comprising 2,300 entries; and the addition of 200 photographs and drawings.

By 2004, the book had sold around 100,000 copies, making it one of the best-selling books published by Stanford University Press.
