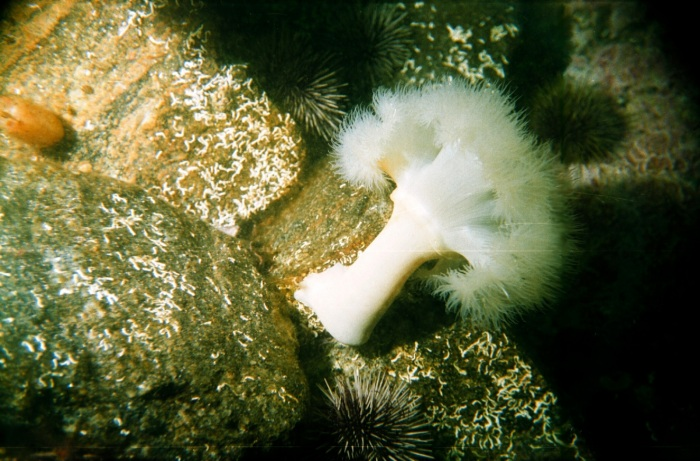
- Metridium senile

Scientific classification
- Kingdom: Animalia
- Phylum: Cnidaria
- Subphylum: Anthozoa
- Class: Hexacorallia
- Order: Actiniaria
- Superfamily: Metridioidea
- Family: Metridiidae; Carlgren, 1893

= Metridiidae =

Family of sea anemones

Metridiidae is a family of sea anemones in the order Actiniaria.

== Characteristics ==
Members of the family Metridiidae are characterised by having a mesogloeal sphincter muscle and by the mesenterial arrangement, with the mesenteries not being divided into macronemes and microcnemes. The acontia typically have microbasic b-mastigophors and microbasic amastigophors, though the latter are not always present in adults.

== Genera ==
The following genera are recognised by the World Register of Marine Species (WoRMS):

- Metridium Blainville, 1824
- Paraisometridium Zamponi, 1978

Of these, Metridium is the most speciose while Paraisometridium is monotypic.
