= 841 (disambiguation) =

841, 841st, 8/41, 84-1, 8.4.1, may refer to:

== In general ==
- 841 (number), a number in the 800s range
- 841 AD (DCCCXLI), a year in the Common Era (CE)
- 841 BC, a year Before the Common Era (BCE)
- August 1941
- January 1984

== Places ==
- 841 Arabella, asteroid #841, the 841st asteroid registered, a main-belt asteroid, a member of the Thera Family
- Highway 841, various roads numbered 841

== Individuals ==
- Said Salih Said Nashir (Guantanamo captive 841)
- Otter 841 (born 2018), a California sea otter

== Military unit #841, 841st ==
- 841st Bombardment Squadron, United States Air Force, USA; a WW2 bomber squadron
- 841 Naval Air Squadron, Fleet Air Army, British Royal Navy, UK; a WW2 carrier-based bomber squadron
- 841 Rocket Regiment (India), Regiment of Artillery, Indian Army, India

=== Warships ===
- North Korean submarine Hero Kim Kun Ok (ship no. 841) tactical nuclear attack submarine of North Korea; Korean: 김군옥영웅함, romanized: Kim Kunok Yeongungham
- German submarine U-841, a WW2 German Kriegsmarine U-boat
- KRI Badau (841), a Waspada-class fast attack craft of Indonesia
- USS Noa (DD-841), Cold War U.S. Navy Gearing-class destroyer

== Vehicles ==
- Indian 841, the 841, a model of army motorcycle from U.S. manufacturer Indian Motorcycles
- Potez 841, the 841, a model of executive air transport turboprop airplane from Potez
- Zakspeed 841, the 841, a model of Formula One racecar built by Zakspeed for the 1985 season
- ČD Class 841, a diesel multiple unit locomotive class of Czechia; see ČD Class 840 and 841

== Other uses ==
- Flight 841 (disambiguation), various aviation incidents
- Qur'an 8:41 (Al-Anfal), a surah passage in the Islamic Koran

== See also ==
- Bus 841 massacre (2002), Karkur Junction, Israel
- Apple iOS 8.4.1
