= Monterey Bay Aquarium =

Nonprofit public aquarium in Monterey, California, United States

- The aquarium's logo depicts giant kelp

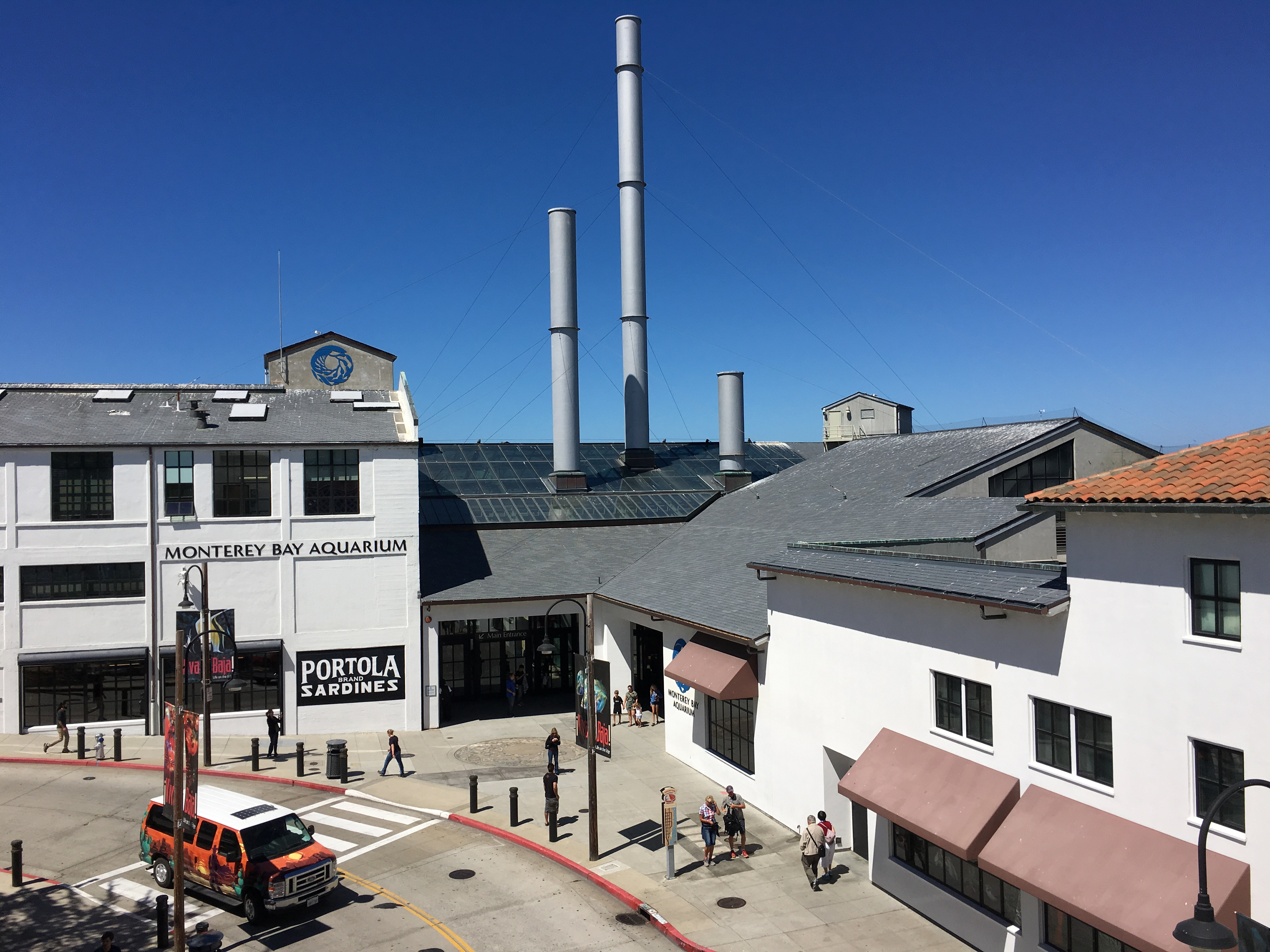
- Main entrance in 2016, featuring the remodeled facade and fiberglass smokestacks of the Hovden Cannery (Note: Chiang 2008, p. 162)
- Interactive map of Monterey Bay Aquarium
- 36.6181°N 121.9019°W
- Slogan: To inspire conservation of the ocean
- Date opened: October 20, 1984; 42 years ago
- Location: Cannery Row, Monterey, California, U.S.
- Floor space: 322,000 square feet (29,900 square meters)
- No. of animals: ~35,000
- No. of species: 550+
- Volume of largest tank: 1.2 million U.S. gallons (4.5 million liters)
- Total volume of tanks: 2.3 million U.S. gallons (8.7 million liters)
- Annual visitors: 2 million
- Memberships: Association of Zoos and Aquariums
- Major exhibits: Kelp Forest, Sea Otters, Jellies, Open Sea
- Public transit: Monterey–Salinas Transit
- Website: montereybayaquarium.org

Monterey Bay Aquarium is a nonprofit public aquarium in Monterey, California, United States. Known for its regional focus on the marine habitats of Monterey Bay, it was the first to exhibit a living kelp forest when it opened in October 1984. Its biologists have pioneered the animal husbandry of jellyfish and it was the first to successfully care for and display a great white shark. The organization's research and conservation efforts also focus on sea otters, various birds, and tunas. Seafood Watch, a sustainable seafood advisory list published by the aquarium beginning in 1999, has influenced the discussion surrounding sustainable seafood. The aquarium was home to Otter 841 prior to her release into the wild as well as Rosa, the oldest living sea otter at the time of her death in 2024.

Early proposals to build a public aquarium in Monterey County were not successful until a group of four marine biologists affiliated with Stanford University revisited the concept in the late 1970s. Monterey Bay Aquarium was built at the site of a defunct sardine cannery and has been recognized for its architectural achievements by the American Institute of Architects. Along with its architecture, the aquarium has won numerous awards for its exhibition of marine life, ocean conservation efforts, and educational programs. It is known for the artistry of its exhibits, which have featured Dale Chihuly glass, David Hockney pieces, 19th-century Ernst Haeckel lithographs and Douglas Morton music compositions.

Monterey Bay Aquarium receives around two million visitors each year. It led to the revitalization of Cannery Row, and produces hundreds of millions of dollars for the economy of Monterey County. In addition to being featured in two PBS Nature documentaries, the aquarium has appeared in film and television productions.

== Founding and design ==
In the early 1960s, scientists at Stanford University's Hopkins Marine Station grew wary of the growing industry on Cannery Row. The station succeeded in convincing the university of their concerns in 1967, and Stanford University purchased the property on Cannery Row that housed the Hovden Cannery, a sardine cannery on the border of Monterey and Pacific Grove. Hovden Cannery closed in 1973 when its parent company moved the plant, and Hopkins used the facility as a warehouse. In the late 1970s, however, Chuck Baxter and Robin Burnett—both faculty members at Hopkins—along with Nancy Burnett, a graduate of Moss Landing Marine Laboratories, and Steve Webster, faculty at San Jose State University, thought of building an aquarium on the Hovden Cannery site. (Note: Chiang 2008, p. 157) Three separate proposals for an aquarium in Monterey County occurred in 1914, 1925, and 1944, but financial backing and public support for the idea were not sufficient. Nancy Burnett brought the group's interest to her parents, Lucile and David Packard (co‑founder of Hewlett-Packard), and their foundation commissioned a feasibility study. An aquarium was predicted to attract 300,000 paying visitors annually, with a potential future increase to 500,000, so, in April 1978, the Packards created the Monterey Bay Aquarium Foundation, which purchased the Hovden property from Stanford for nearly US$1 million. Around this time, Julie Packard—also a daughter of David and Lucile—joined the planning group. David Packard funded construction with an initial donation of $7 million, with the caveat that the private nonprofit would be financially self-supporting after it opened. (Note: Palumbi & Sotka 2011, p. 151) Due to an expansion of its planned exhibits—after visits to public aquariums in Japan—and the design and creation of exhibits in‑house, the Packards paid a final sum of $55 million. (Note: Chiang 2008, p. 158)

General contracting firm Rudolph and Sletten predicted the building would take 31 months (two and a half years) to construct, but project manager Linda Rhodes and architectural firm Esherick, Homsey, Dodge, and Davis (EHDD) first had to design the facility to fit Cannery Row. Those involved intended to reconstruct Hovden Cannery rather than destroy it, and EHDD acknowledged that the latter would be "a big disservice to our visiting public and to the community". (Note: Chiang 2008, p. 161) Concrete sections of the building were able to be kept, but other areas were repurposed; the cannery's old warehouse was converted into administrative offices, and a seawater system for the aquatic exhibits replaced the cannery's pump house that brought fish to the warehouse from floating storage tanks in the bay. (Note: Chiang 2008, pp. 161–162) The facility was constructed around the cannery's boiler house, which is preserved as a non-functioning public exhibit. Because the building would reside partially over water, unique challenges occurred throughout construction. Nearly half of the aquarium would be located over the bay in depths of up to 120 ft (37 m), requiring foundational elements to be installed during low tide, which often occurred at night. According to a project manager with Rudolph and Sletten, excavations were sometimes lost as the composition of the ground underneath beach sand was inconsistent. (Note: Chiang 2008, p. 164)

Various elements of the building mirrored that of Hovden Cannery, including its windows (to let in sunlight), plain cement walls, structural protection from waves and storms, and its many roofs. (Note: Charles Davis (with architectural firm EHDD) called it a "hodgepodge of roofs" and a journalist described it as a "jumble of rooflines". (Note: Chiang 2008, p. 163)) Exposed pipes and ducts along the ceiling also contributed to the industrial style of buildings on Cannery Row. The ironic transition from a plant that processed fish to an aquarium which would display them did not prevent the facility from appearing like a cannery, according to multiple journalists. The aquarium's successful representation of the cannery was acknowledged by the California Historical Society with a historical preservation award.

When Monterey Bay Aquarium opened on October 20, 1984, (Note: Chiang 2008, p. 155) it was the largest public aquarium in the United States. On opening day, 11,000 people visited it and around 30,000 people attended the day's festivities. In reference to the disappearance of sardines (through overfishing), which caused the canneries to close, the aquarium said that "the fish are back!" Throughout the following year, 2.4 million people visited, which influenced assumptions about "the ability of marine life to entertain, educate, and promote a city." Within five years, it was reported in the Los Angeles Times that it was among California's most popular visitor attractions. By 1994, it was the most attended aquarium in the United States. For its design, EHDD was awarded a National Honor Award from the American Institute of Architects in 1988. The institute's state chapter in California gave the facility its Twenty-five Year Award in 2011 and, in 2016, it was awarded the national Twenty-five Year Award, described as "a benchmark and role model for aquariums everywhere."

The aquarium's 20,000 square feet (1,900 m^{2}) of decks allow visitors to look out over the bay. According to the national Twenty-five Year Award jury, the inclusion of broad windows "blurs the line between museum and natural habitat".

In discussing the aquarium's conservation and education programs, its track record for entertaining visitors, and its reputation for collaboration, the head of the Association of Zoos and Aquariums described it as "a definite leader" in 2009 to the Los Angeles Times. (Note: Reynolds 2009: "'They are a definite leader,' says Kristin Vehrs, executive director of the Maryland-based Assn. of Zoos & Aquariums, which accredits aquariums. 'They do a great job of balancing the crowd-pleasing with the rigor of the education and conservation programs. They've also been good at sharing' expertise with other institutions.") From when it opened in 1984 until 2026, Julie Packard was the aquarium's executive director. She was succeeded by Jenny Gray.

== Aquarium exhibits ==
According to a progress report during the aquarium's planning phase in 1980, the founders' efforts to build an aquarium developed from an interest in sharing marine life of the region with the public. This would be accomplished through its exhibits, featuring the aquatic habitats of Monterey Bay and central California. (Note: Chiang 2008, pp. 155, 165) The idea to display marine habitats was inspired by the work of ecologist Ed Ricketts in his 1939 book on intertidal ecology, Between Pacific Tides. In the early 1980s this was a unique approach to the design of public aquariums, as the two largest public aquariums at the time in the United States—Boston's New England Aquarium (1969) and Baltimore's National Aquarium (1981)—focused on "magnificent coral reef exhibits or big sharks", and displayed few local species. (Note: Palumbi & Sotka 2011, p. 149)

=== Seawater system ===
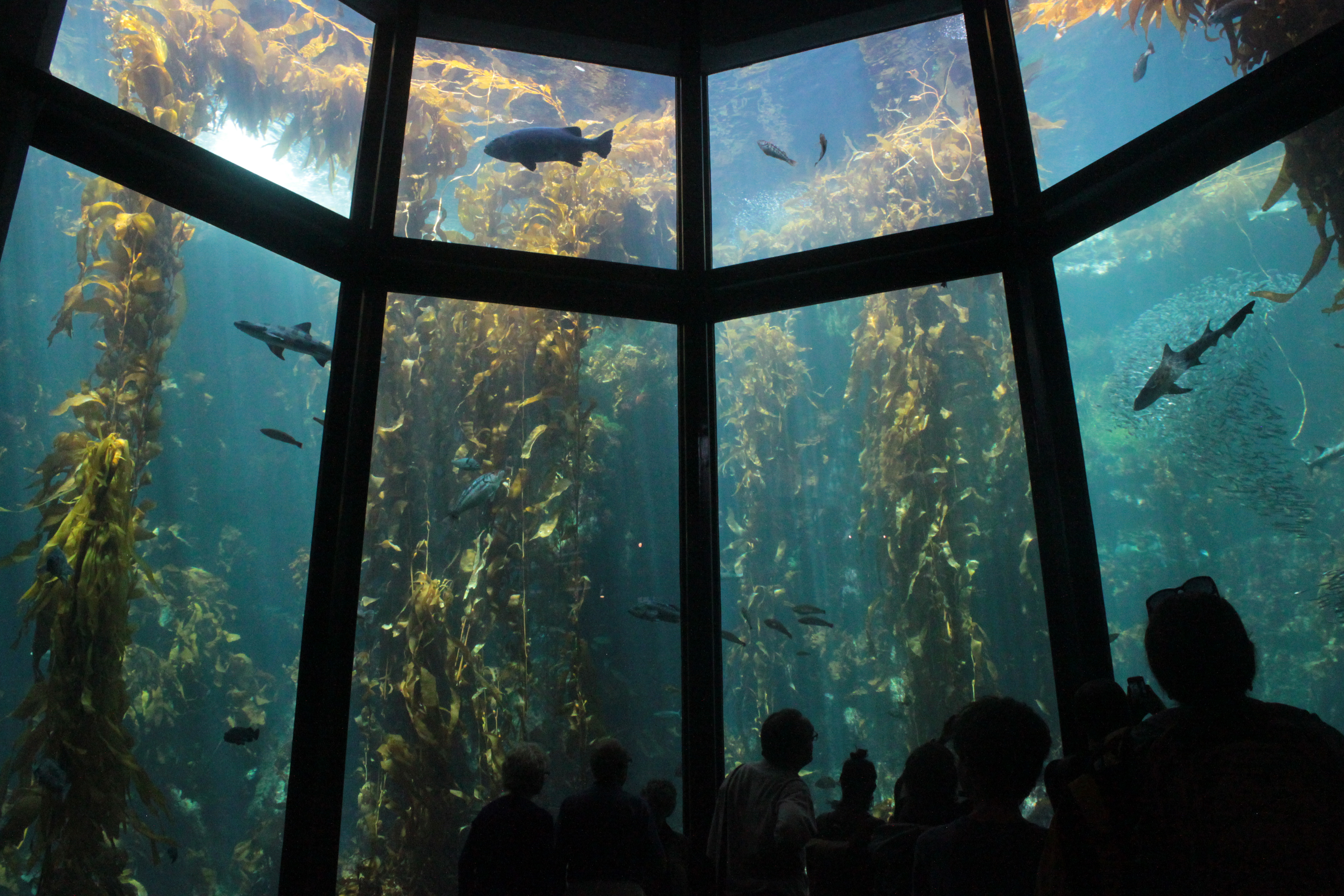
Main viewing area of the 320,000-US-gallon (1,200,000 L) Kelp Forest exhibit, seen from ground level

Monterey Bay Aquarium displays 35,000 animals (Note: This represents the most widely-used figure. In a 1995 census of the aquarium's exhibits, more than 340,000 individual creatures were counted, of which 106,000 were strawberry anemones. (Note: Chiang 2008, p. 172)) belonging to over 550 species in 2.3 million U.S. gallons (8,700,000 L) of water. Filtered seawater from Monterey Bay is pumped into the Kelp Forest and other exhibits at 2,000 US gallons (7,600 L) per minute. At night, unfiltered seawater (or "raw seawater") is used for the Kelp Forest exhibit to maintain its realistic appearance. The use of unfiltered seawater allows animals to grow in the aquarium's plumbing, so it must occasionally be cleaned with tools called pigs, which blast through the pipes under pressure to remove organisms and debris. (Note: "Oceans in Glass" 2006: events occur at 12:17 and 13:48.) Control systems that maintain this seawater system and other life support components for the animals are mostly automated, tracking various chemical parameters and reducing the likelihood for human error during repetitive tasks such as filter media backwashing. The seawater system is controlled by more than 10,000 data points.

=== Kelp Forest exhibit ===
At 28 feet (8.5 m) tall and 65 feet (20 m) long, the Kelp Forest exhibit is the focal point of Monterey Bay Aquarium's Ocean's Edge wing. Nearly three stories high, the exhibit is regarded as the first successful attempt to maintain a living kelp forest in an artificial setting. (Note: Chiang 2008, p. 168) During the facility's planning and construction, professionals doubted that kelp could be grown in an aquarium at this scale. And, even if it could be grown, critics of the project did not think the public would be interested in seeing this representation of Monterey Bay. (Note: "Oceans in Glass" 2006 (at 9:45): "This is a living kelp forest, and its creation flew in the face of professionals who thought it was a losing proposition. Nobody had ever successfully grown kelp on this scale, but there were also more pressing concerns. The exhibit was intended to recreate a key habitat of the Monterey Bay, and critics scoffed that nobody would be interested. The public rendered its verdict quickly: they were enthralled.") During the design phase, kelp scientists Wheeler North at the California Institute of Technology and Mike Neushal at the University of California, Santa Barbara informed the aquarium of the kelp's needs. The exhibit's success at sustaining giant kelp and its realistic appearance are attributed to the availability of direct sunlight, the use of natural seawater from Monterey Bay, and a surge machine (a large plunger) that replicates California's pulsing water currents. (Note: "Oceans in Glass" 2006: event occurs at 10:41.) The 5-foot (1.5 m) surge machine, which plunges every 6 seconds, allows the kelp in the exhibit to grow an average of 4 inches (10 cm) per day and was designed and constructed by David Packard. Kelp forests are important ecosystems along California's coast—comparable to tropical rainforests in their biodiversity—and, alongside giant kelp, the exhibit contains species of fish indigenous to Monterey Bay, including rockfishes and leopard sharks.

=== Open Sea wing ===
In 1996, Monterey Bay Aquarium opened a second wing of aquatic exhibits, focusing on the pelagic habitats found 60 miles (97 km) offshore in Monterey Bay. Costing US$57 million and taking seven years to develop, the wing almost doubled the aquarium's public exhibit space. It consists of three separate galleries: various jellyfish and other plankton found in the bay; a pelagic, large community exhibit; and "ocean travelers", which features tufted puffins and sea turtles. When the exhibition opened, the San Francisco Chronicle reported the aquarium had the most jellyfish on exhibit in the world. (Note: McCabe 1996: "The aquarium holds the largest permanent collection of jellyfish species in the United States and displays more of them than does any other facility in the world.") In 1997, the Association of Zoos and Aquariums awarded the wing its Exhibit Award.

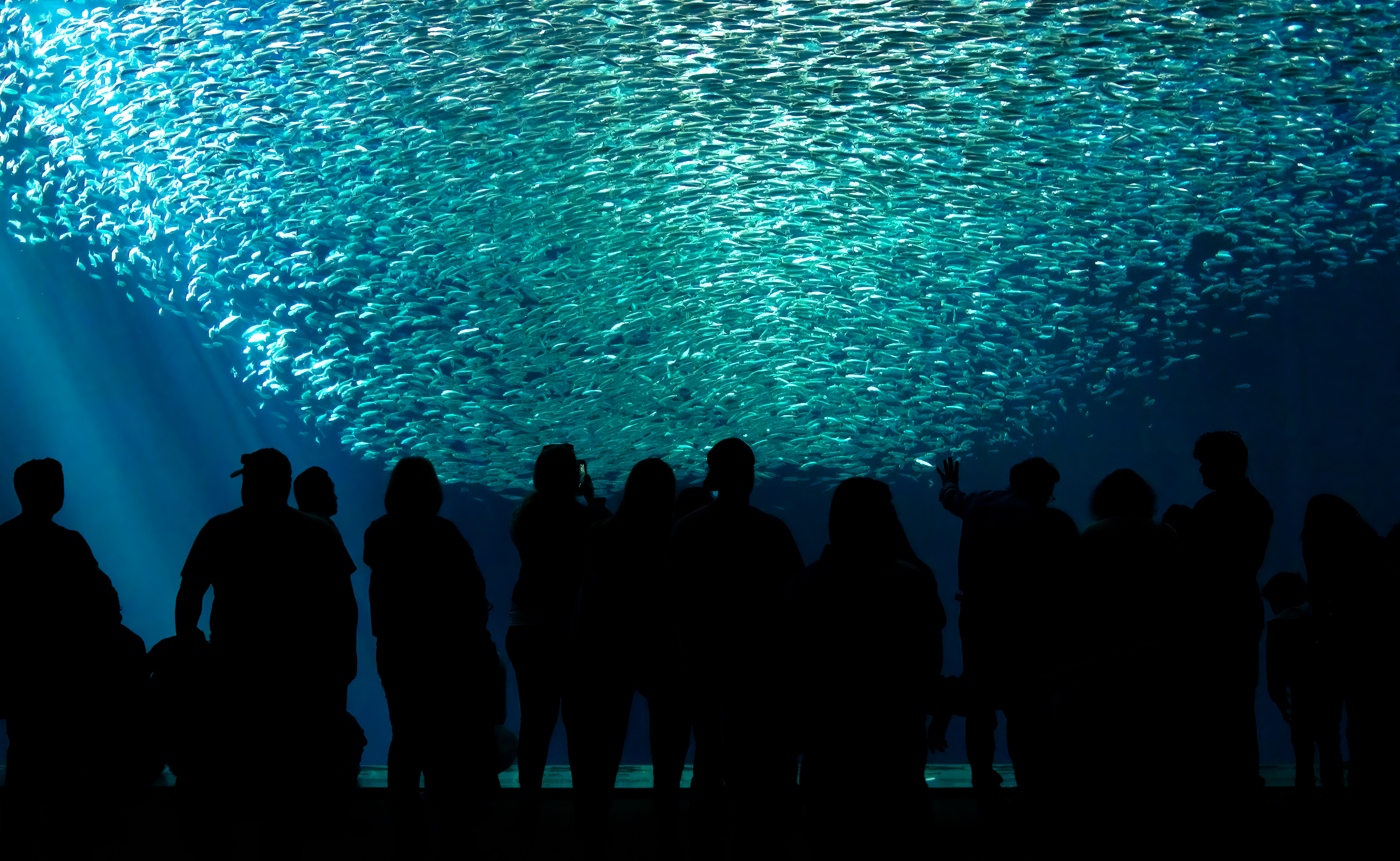
The million-gallon Open Sea community exhibit contains a school of Pacific sardines that, in 2011, numbered 14,000 individuals.

Holding 1.2 million US gallons (4,500,000 L), the Open Sea community exhibit is the aquarium's largest tank. Made of fiberglass-reinforced plastic, it is 80 feet (24 m) long and 35 feet (11 m) deep. Its largest viewing window—at 54 feet (16 m) long and 14.5 feet (4.4 m) tall—was reportedly the largest aquarium window in the world when it was installed in 1996. To discourage animals from swimming into the window in the absence of visitors and injuring or killing themselves (as a 239-pound [108 kg] Pacific bluefin tuna did in 2007), an air hose underneath the window generates a "bubble wall" in front of it throughout the night. In 2011, species reported to be in the exhibit included green sea turtles, sardines, pelagic stingrays, scalloped hammerhead sharks, sandbar sharks, mahi-mahi, mackerel, bluefin and yellowfin tunas, and ocean sunfishes. (Note: According to the aquarium, it was the first to display the ocean sunfish in the United States in August 1986. The first sunfish's name was Tweedledum, and it ate 1 pound (0.45 kg) of prawns each day.) Historically, the exhibit also included blue sharks, oceanic whitetip sharks, Galapagos sharks, soupfin sharks, and California barracuda. Six great white sharks were displayed in the Open Sea exhibit between 2004 and 2011, an effort contested by some but generally described as having a positive scientific and educational impact. Prior to the display of the first white shark for six months before its release, the longest length of time that a white shark had survived in an aquarium was 16 days.

A 10-month, US$19 million renovation of the wing concluded in July 2011 to refurbish the community exhibit. (Note: The wing's name was changed from "Outer Bay" to "Open Sea" during this renovation.) Turbulent swimming patterns of 300-pound (140 kg) tunas were dismantling the exhibit's structural glass tiles, which the sea turtles were subsequently eating, so the exhibit was drained after all 10,000 animals were caught. Supplemental exhibits were added as part of this renovation featuring artwork that highlights current issues in ocean conservation, including overfishing and marine plastic pollution.

=== Other permanent exhibits ===
Monterey Bay Aquarium opened in 1984 with 83 tanks in 12 galleries, (Note: Chiang 2008, p. 165) which more than doubled by 2014 into 200 live animal exhibits. In addition to the large Kelp Forest and Open Sea exhibits, the Monterey Bay Habitats tank is 90 feet (27 m) long, the shape of a figure eight, and holds over 300,000 US gallons (1,100,000 L), a similar volume of seawater to the Kelp Forest. As its name suggests, it represents various habitats in Monterey Bay, from wharfs to the sandy seafloor to deep rocky reefs. Many aquariums in this exhibit contain man-made structures that were left in the bay to accumulate living organisms prior to the aquarium's opening; in Monterey Bay Habitats, real pilings were obtained from the city's harbor department for the exhibit's wharf section. In others, artificial rocks tricked visitors and fish alike. With the aquarium's debut, this "nature-faking" via human manipulation did not trick some, but the "'fakeness' did not necessarily detract from the aquarium's intrinsic value." (Note: Chiang 2008, pp. 167–168)

Rescued sea otters, such as Opal or Rosa, live in a habitat holding 55,000 US gallons (210,000 L), and are the only marine mammals exhibited. In 2014, the aquarium stated to the Vancouver Courier that it takes no official position on the controversy of captive killer whales or other cetaceans. The facility was not constructed to house cetaceans, and instead utilizes the 27 species of marine mammals that live in or travel through Monterey Bay as one of its "exhibits", as guests can view the bay and marine mammals from decks along the back of the building.

Monterey Bay Aquarium was the first public aquarium to have its interior mapped on Google Street View, creating a virtual walking tour.

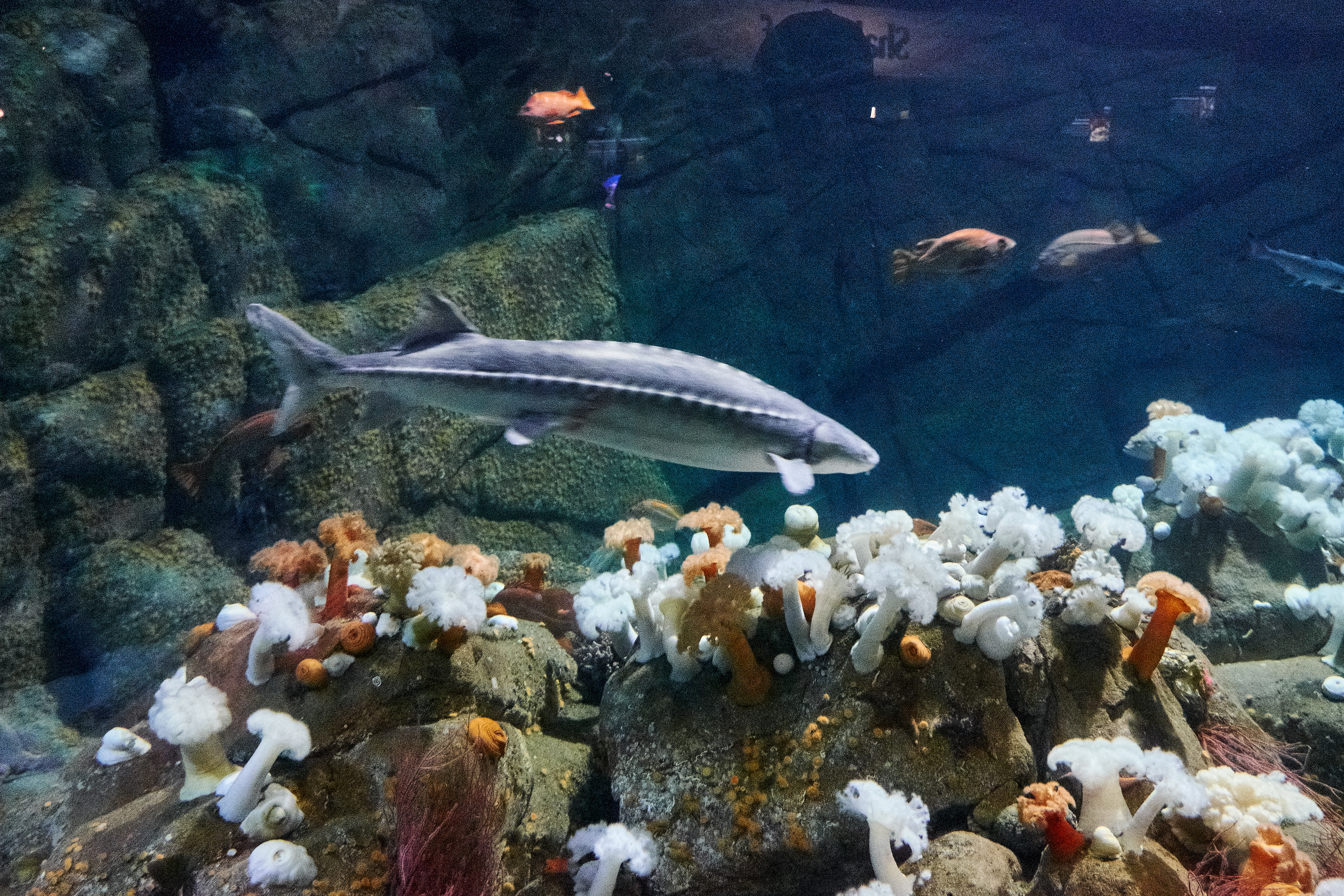
A white sturgeon, rockfishes, and plumose anemones in the Monterey Bay Habitats exhibit

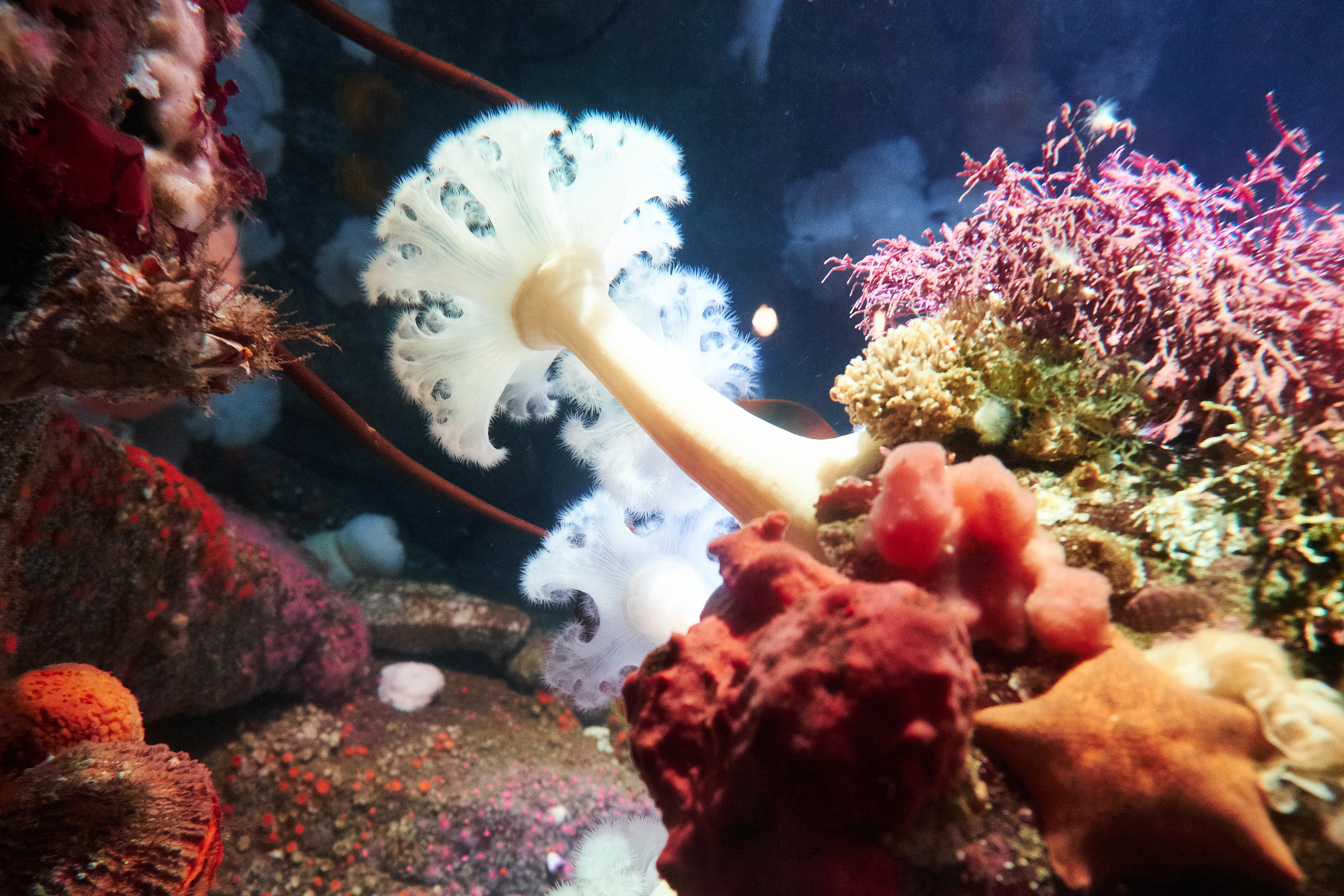
Plumose anemones, a rock scallop, a bat star, sponges, and other cold-water invertebrates native to Monterey Bay

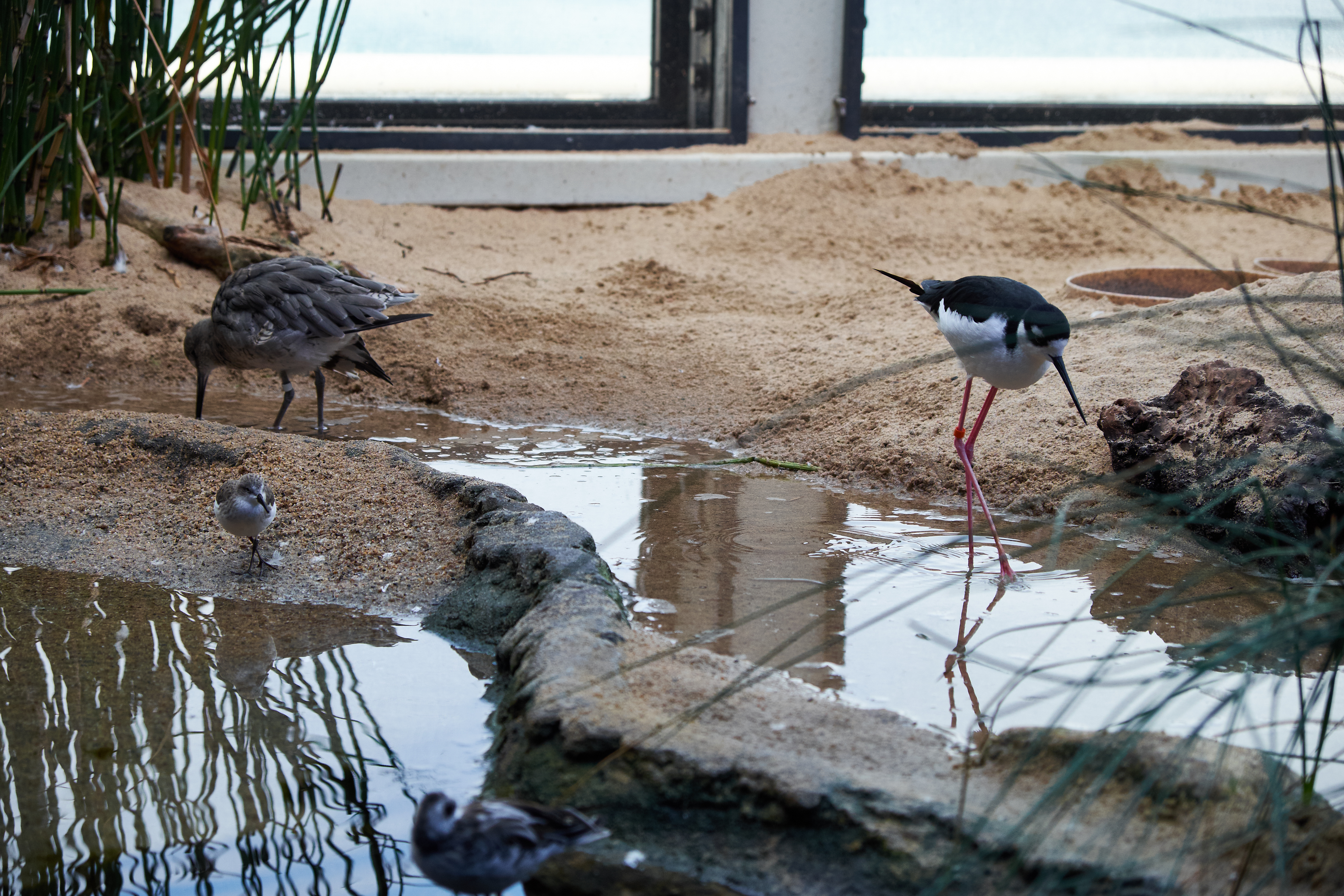
Local shorebird species in the aviary, which contains man-made sand dunes and marshes

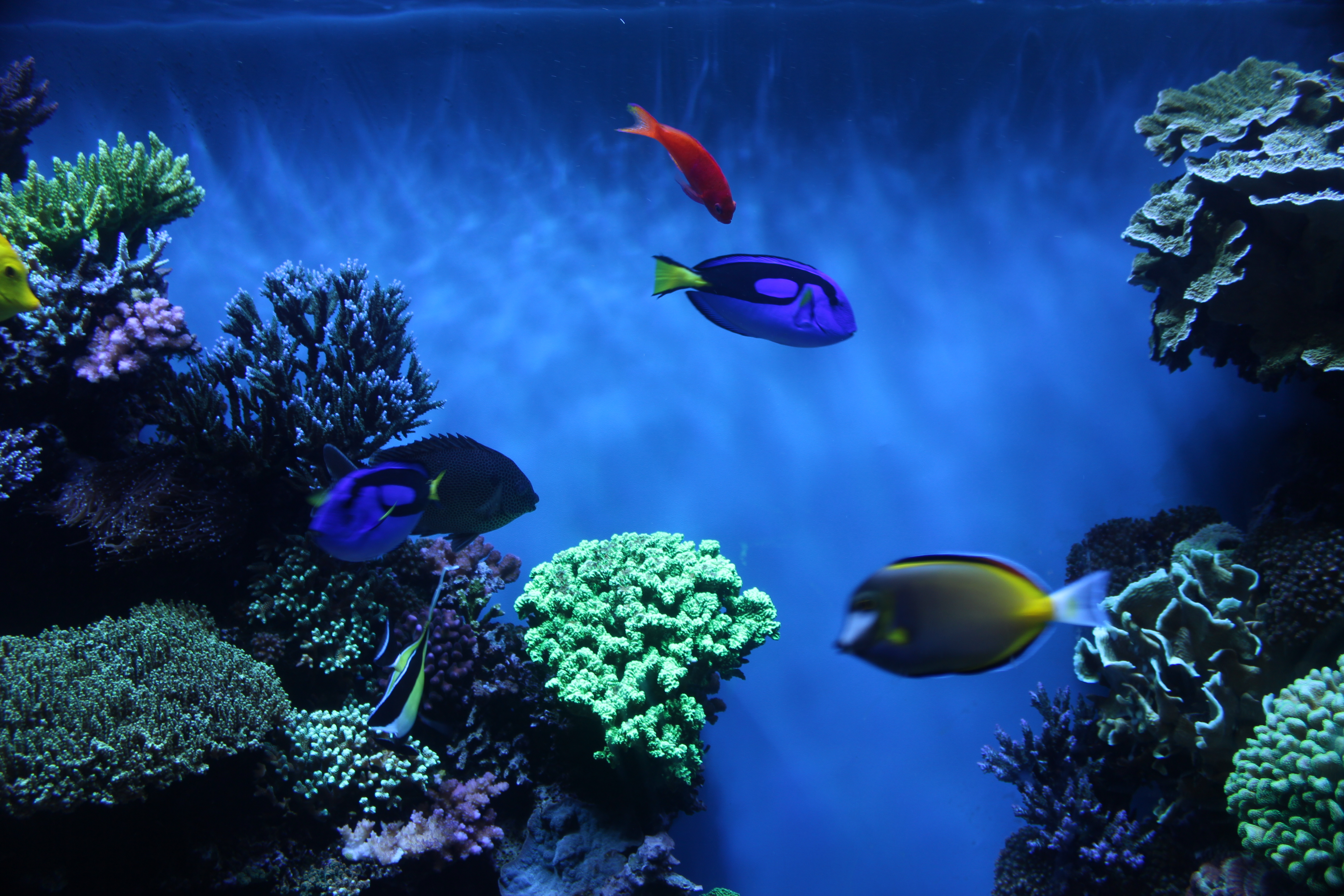
Pacific coral reef community containing living corals

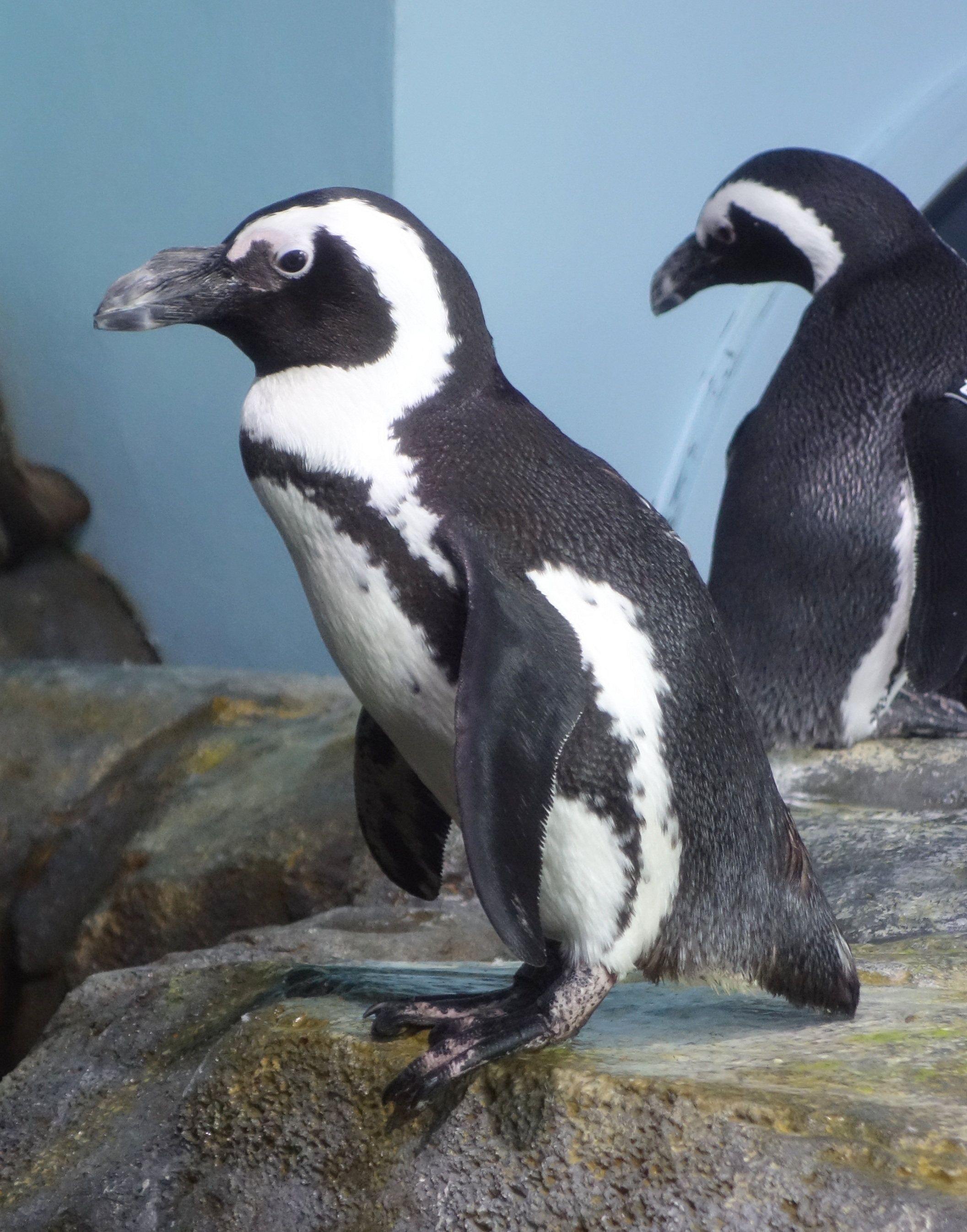
African penguins on exhibit

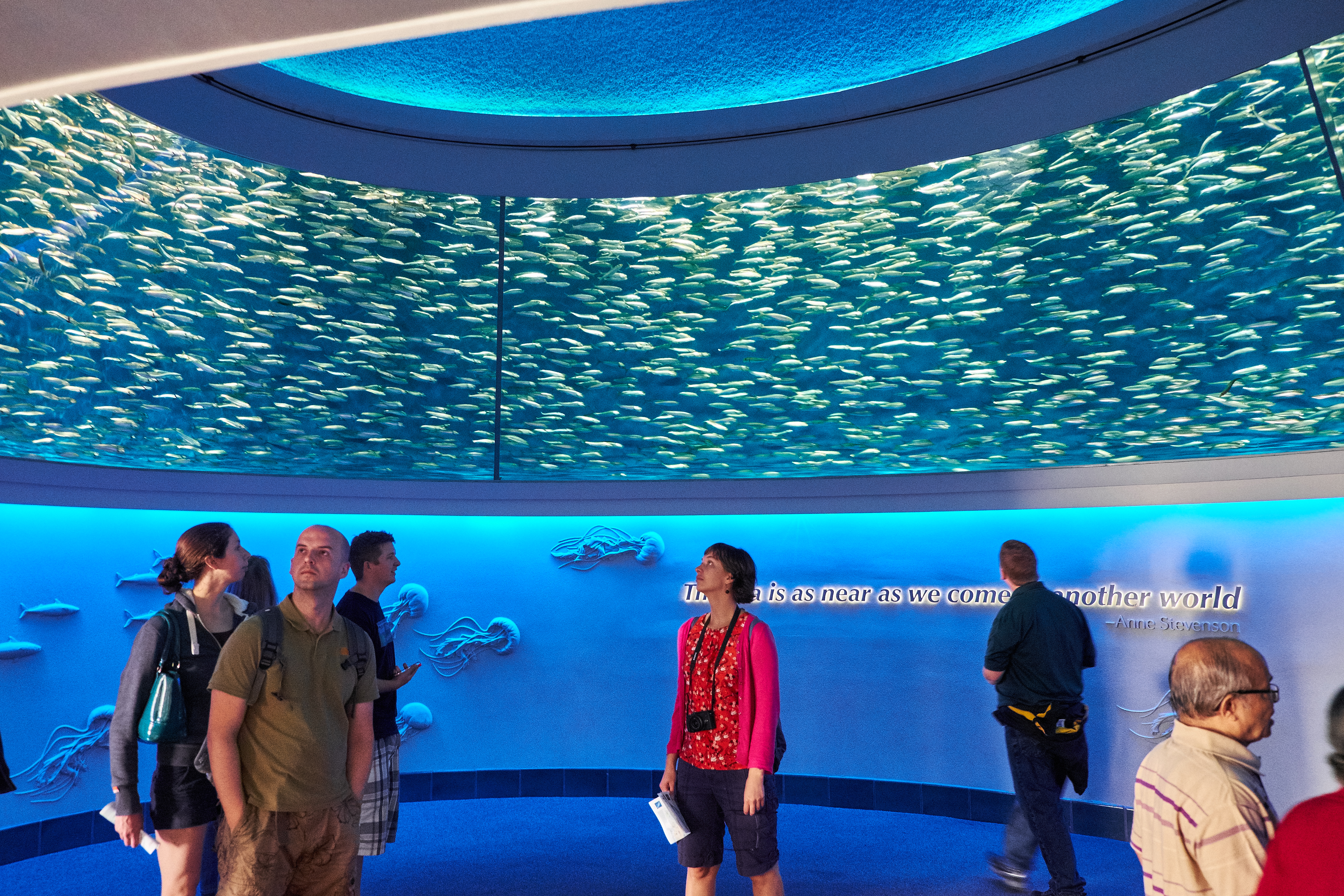
A circular exhibit at the entrance to the Open Sea wing contains schooling Pacific sardines.

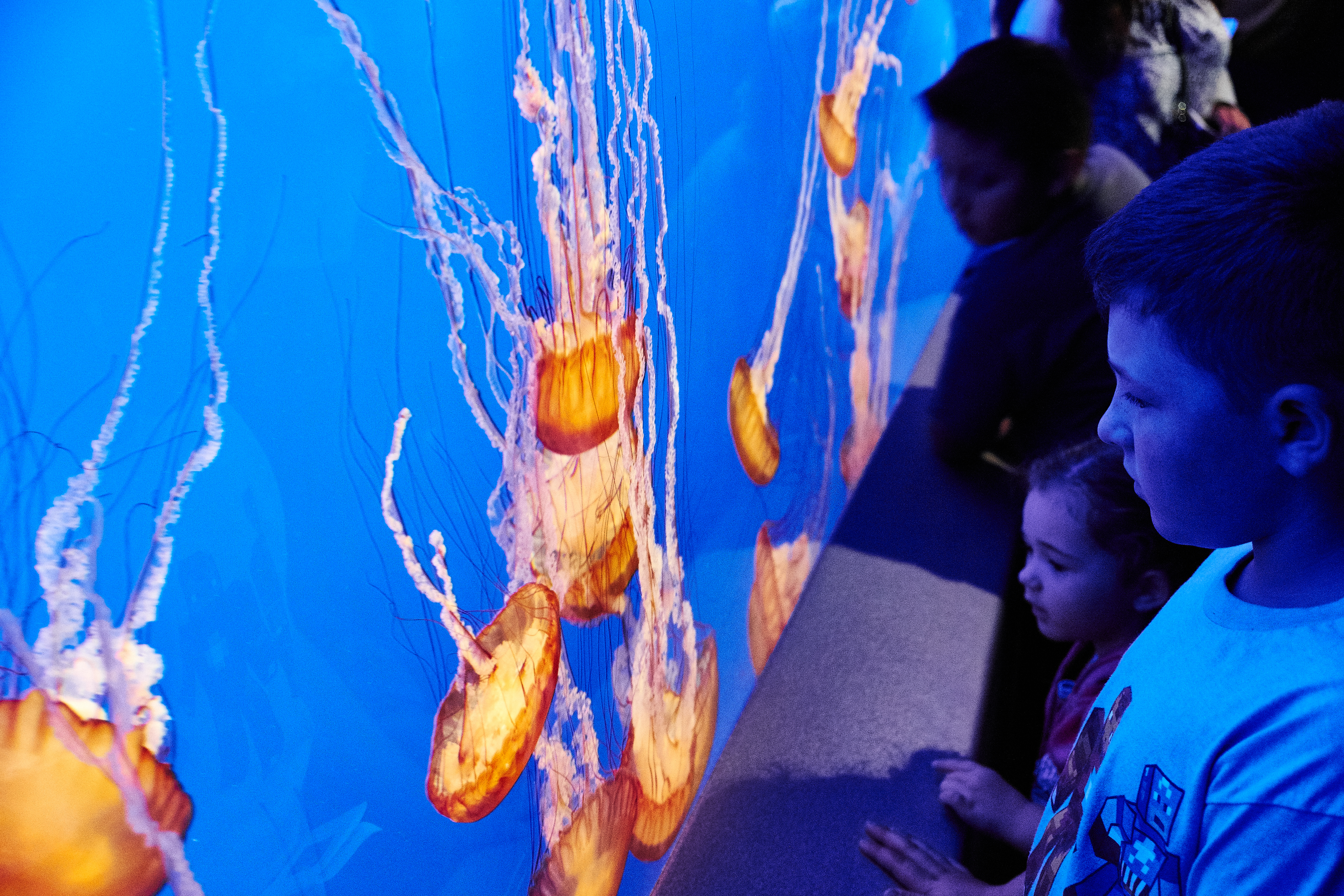
Pacific sea nettles in a long kreisel tank

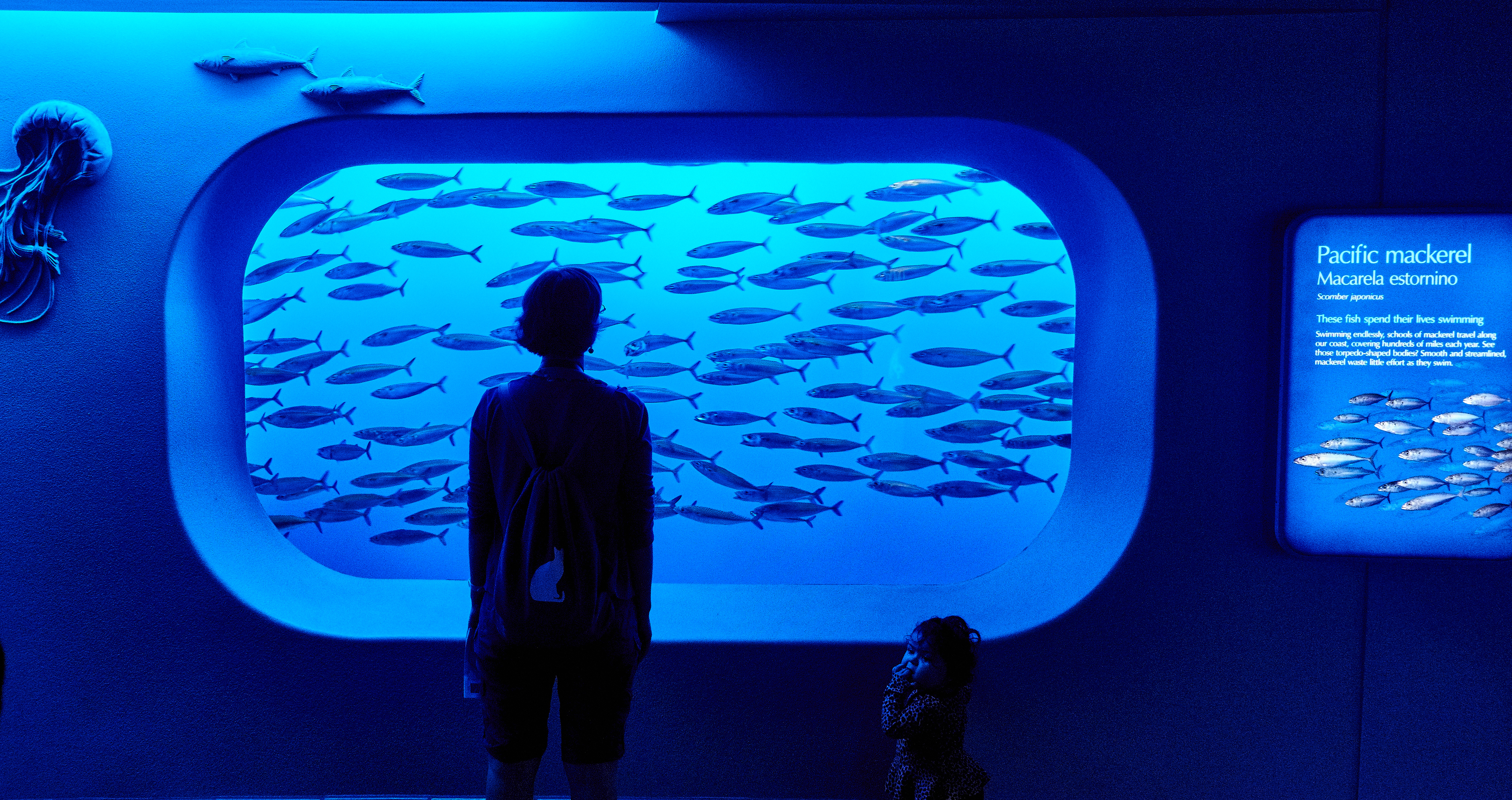
An exhibit demonstrates the streamlined bodies of Pacific mackerel.

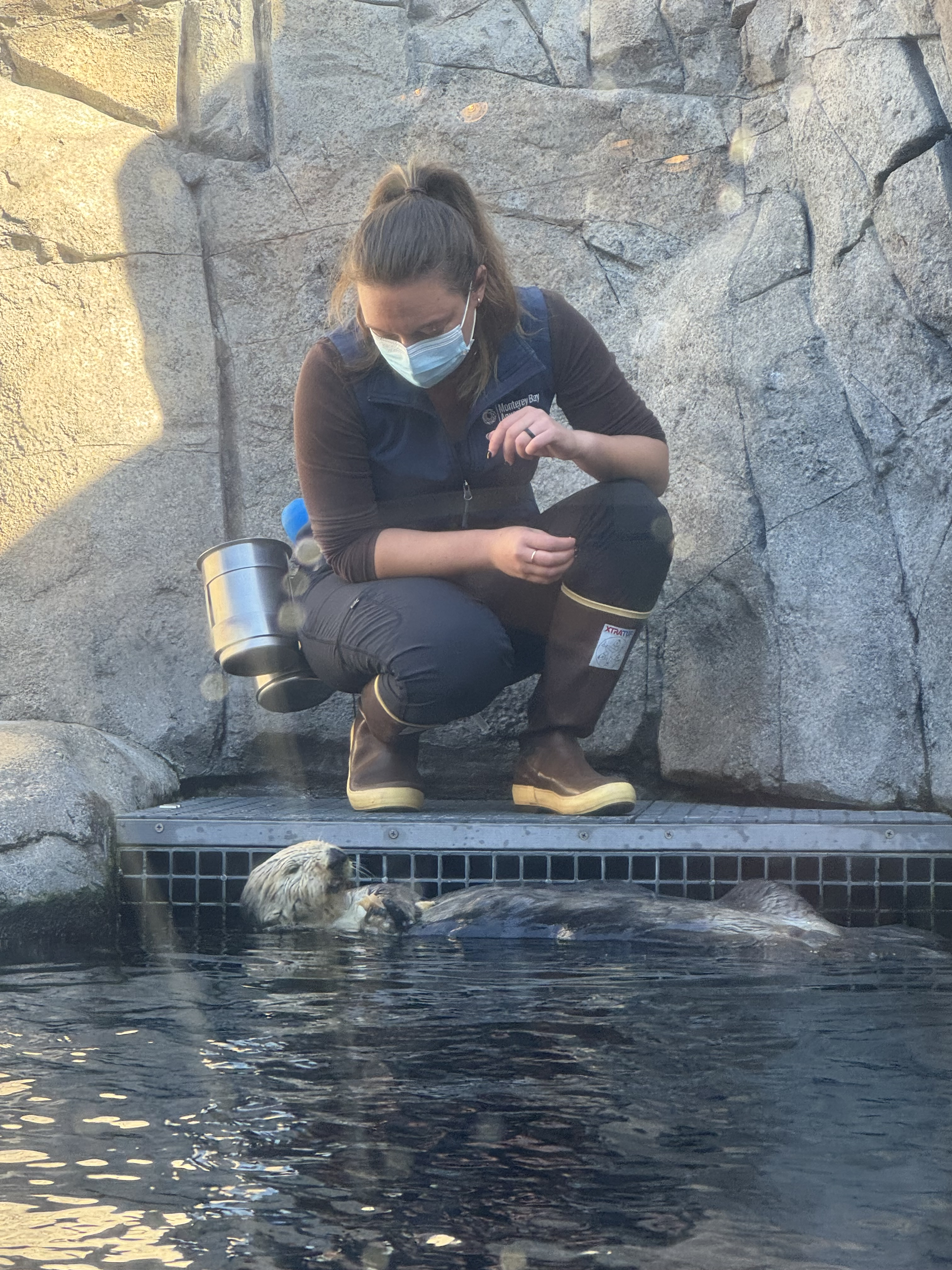
A caretaker training Rosa the sea otter at the sea otter exhibit

=== Temporary exhibitions ===
Monterey Bay Aquarium began creating temporary exhibitions (or "special exhibitions") in the 1980s to display animals that are found outside of Monterey Bay. The first of these, titled "Mexico's Secret Sea", focused on the Sea of Cortez in 1989. Most exhibitions since then have focused on animal groups, including deep-sea animals (1999), sharks (2004), otters (2007), seahorses (2009), cephalopods (2014), and jellyfish. The 1997 "Fishing for Solutions" exhibition led to the development of the sustainable seafood program, Seafood Watch. (Note: Spring 2018, p. 159) In 2010, an exhibition titled "Hot Pink Flamingos" was one of the first aquarium exhibitions in the United States to explicitly discuss the effects of global warming on habitats and animals. Its content was successfully accessible and compelling to the public, but the exhibition was criticized for its narrow "consumerist approach" to climate change communication—promoting individual, marketplace-based actions rather than collective political ones.

At least three exhibitions have been devoted entirely to displaying jellyfish. In 1989, the aquarium's second temporary exhibition, titled "Living Treasures of the Pacific", included three jellyfish tanks following the successful display of one tank of moon jellies four years earlier in 1985. In 1992, the first temporary exhibition for jellyfish opened, called "Planet of the Jellies", the success of which prompted a permanent jellyfish gallery within the Open Sea wing in 1996. Within 20 years of opening Planet of the Jellies, the aquarium created two more temporary exhibitions centered on jellyfish. The final one of the three exhibitions opened in 2012, and displayed around 16 species of jellyfish from around the world in "a psychedelic theme from the 1960s". Staff members attribute the organization's fascination with jellyfish to their visual appeal, primitive biology, and reputed calming effect on visitors.

Terrestrial animals were displayed for the first time—including a tarantula, a snake, and a scorpion—in a US$3.8 million exhibit on ecosystems of Baja California that opened in 2016. In April 2022, a US$15 million, 10,000-square-foot (930 m^{2}) exhibit focusing on deep sea animals opened after more than five years of development. The process relied extensively on technology used by Monterey Bay Aquarium Research Institute to collect animals nearly 5,000 feet (1,500 m) deep, and required the aquarium to build special tanks that provided freezing temperatures, high acidity, and low oxygen for animals. To lower the oxygen, applied water science staff manipulated a technique used in brewing. Some animals displayed included glowing jellies, giant isopods, brisingid sea stars, and sea angels.

== Research and conservation ==
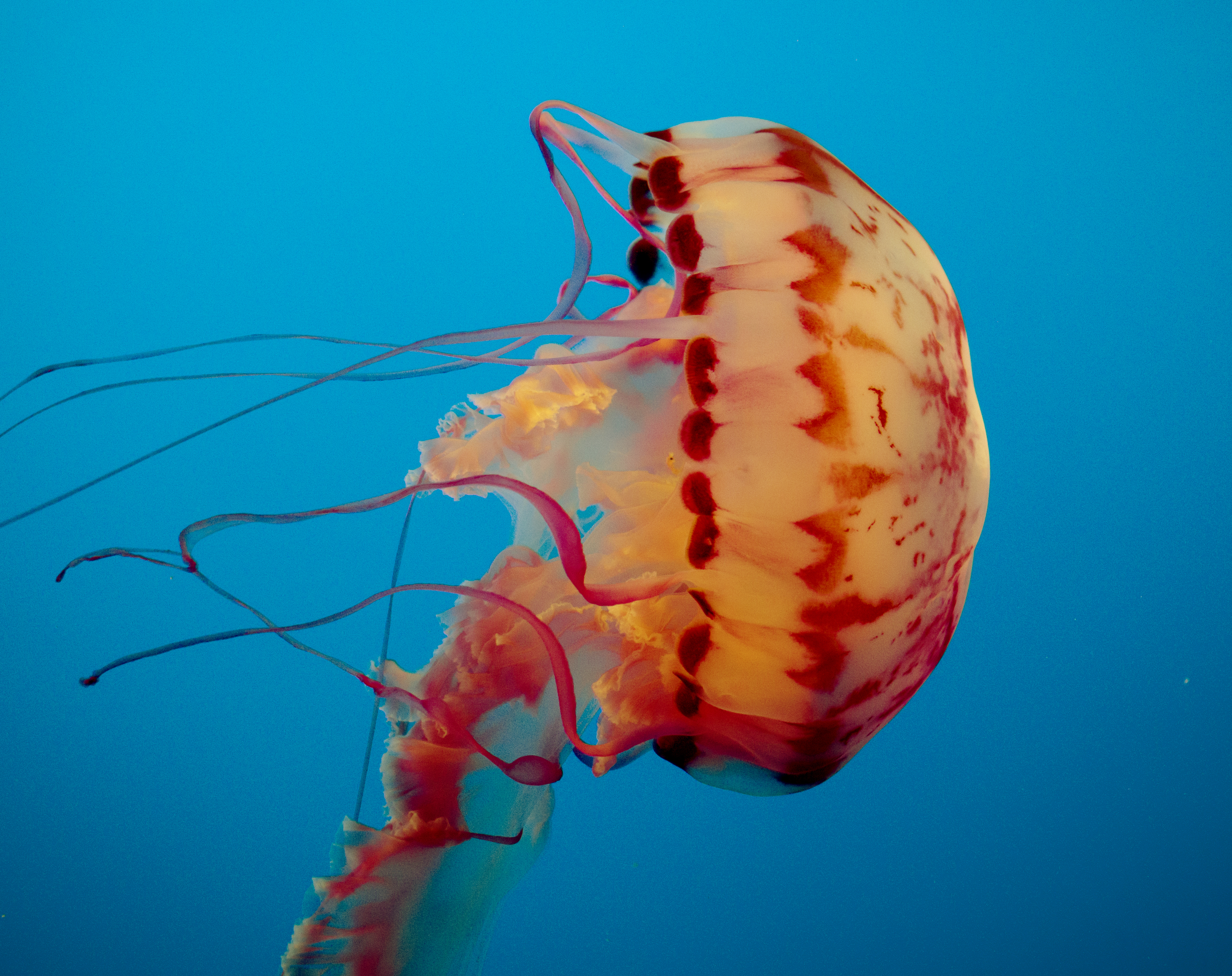
A purple-striped jelly (Chrysaora colorata), which the aquarium has been recognized for breeding, in the Open Sea wing

Monterey Bay Aquarium helped create momentum for the establishment of the Monterey Bay National Marine Sanctuary in 1992, one of the largest marine protected areas in the United States. In 2004, the aquarium created a formal division to become involved in United States ocean policy and law, working with the Pew Charitable Trusts and the United States Commission on Ocean Policy at the onset. (Note: Spring 2018, p. 160) Staff scientists have authored scientific publications involving sea otters, great white sharks, and bluefin tunas, which are important species in the northern Pacific Ocean. In addition to other animals, work has been published in the areas of veterinary medicine, visitor studies, and museum exhibition development. Among over 200 institutions accredited by the Association of Zoos and Aquariums, Monterey Bay Aquarium ranked 10th in scientific publication activity between 1993 and 2013.

For Monterey Bay Aquarium's captive animal propagation efforts, the Association of Zoos and Aquariums has granted two awards, including one for the aquarium's work with purple-striped jellies in 1992. It has also received the association's general conservation award for its Sea Otter Research and Conservation Program. In October 2017, the World Association of Zoos and Aquariums conferred its Conservation Award to the aquarium for its "commitment to ocean protection and public awareness".

=== Marine life ===
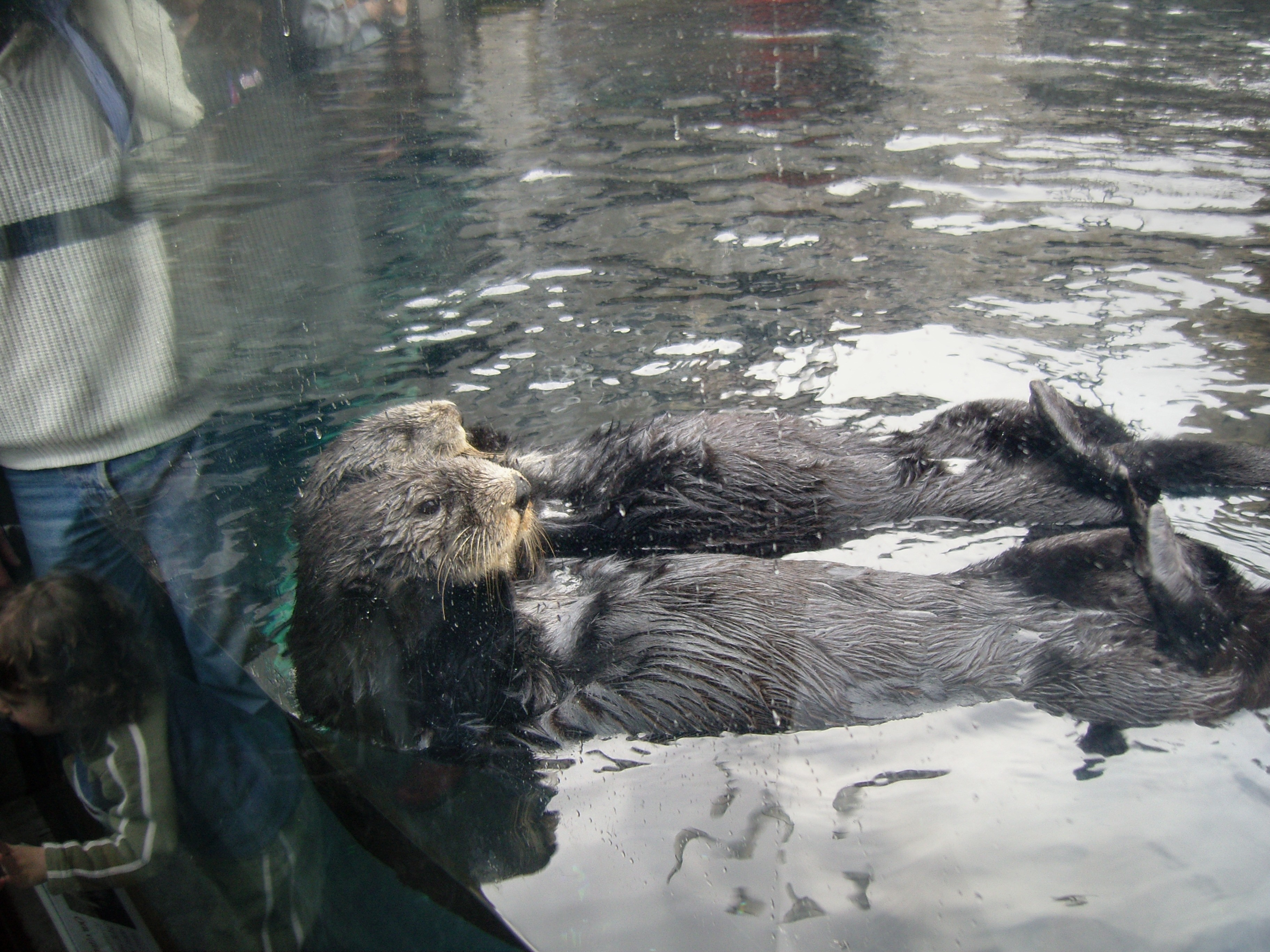
Rehabilitated sea otters on exhibit

Monterey Bay Aquarium's Sea Otter Research and Conservation program began in 1984 to research and rehabilitate wild southern sea otters. As of October 2017, more than 800 individuals had completed the rehabilitation program and researchers have collected data on wild sea otter populations using electronic tags. An otter rescued in 2001 began the program's surrogacy efforts, in which adult female sea otters that have been rehabilitated but cannot be released act as surrogate mothers to stranded sea otter pups. The aquarium was the only sea otter rehabilitation site in California until The Marine Mammal Center began expanding a program for sea otters in 2017. Its work with sea otters is featured in the PBS Nature episode titled "Saving Otter 501", which aired in October 2013.

Shorebirds, such as the threatened western snowy plover, are also rehabilitated and released. Since around 1998, the aquarium has worked with Point Blue Conservation Science to rescue western snowy plover eggs. The eggs hatch after being artificially incubated, and are raised until they are independent enough for release. The two organizations released 180 individuals in 2012, and about 100 individuals in 2013. The aquarium's endangered African penguins are part of an Association of Zoos and Aquariums species survival plan, a program that identifies genetically important birds and allows specific breeding activity to occur. Five chicks have hatched in the penguin colony as of 2014 and some of those have been sent to other accredited institutions. Beginning in June 2007, the aquarium operates a public presentation with its rehabilitated Laysan albatross that has a wingspan of 6 feet (1.8 m). The program's goal is to inform visitors of the dangers that ocean plastic pollution causes for animals, especially the 21 species of albatrosses.

Pacific bluefin and yellowfin tunas have been historically displayed in the Open Sea community exhibit, some reaching more than 300 pounds (140 kg). In 2011, three dozen fishes of the two species were on exhibit. Prior to opening the Open Sea wing in 1996, the aquarium established the Tuna Research and Conservation Center in 1994 in partnership with Stanford University's Hopkins Marine Station. Staff scientists and Barbara Block—professor of marine sciences at Stanford University—have tagged wild Pacific bluefin tunas to study predator-prey relationships, and have also investigated tuna endothermy with captive tunas at the center. (Note: "Oceans in Glass" 2006: event occurs at 41:20.) To improve international collaboration of bluefin tuna management, Monterey Bay Aquarium and Stanford University hosted a symposium in January 2016 in Monterey. Over 200 scientists, fisheries managers, and policy makers gathered to discuss solutions to the decline of Pacific bluefin tuna populations.

Aquarists also propagate animals behind-the-scenes for the public exhibits. Since 1985, the aquarium has been deeply involved in jellyfish propagation, (Note: In 2009, the jellyfish expert at the aquarium expected "three good stings" every week.) creating three temporary exhibitions and one permanent gallery (within the Open Sea wing). The organization's jellyfish collections have been the largest in the world, (Note: "Oceans in Glass" 2006 (at 5:23): "The jelly collection at the aquarium is the largest in the world.") and its pioneering work with the animals resulted in a trend of jellyfish exhibitions in the United States. (Note: Yollin 2012: "The Monterey Bay Aquarium pioneered the display of jellyfish in North America and spawned a trend of jelly exhibits around the United States.") (Note: Reynolds 2009: "... and it has pioneered the display of jellyfish and ...") In August 2016, aquarists cultured comb jellies for the first time in a laboratory, which may allow them to become a model organism. Beginning in 2012, the aquarium began to breed many species of cephalopods in preparation for a temporary exhibition that opened in 2014. For the duration of the exhibition, half of the animals were cultured because of their short life cycles. A display in the exhibition showcased how aquarists rear different species of cephalopods, including bigfin reef squid, which live for only about six months. In partnership with Monterey Bay Aquarium Research Institute, at least two deep-sea cephalopod species were displayed in the exhibition, including flapjack octopuses and the vampire squid.

==== Great white sharks ====
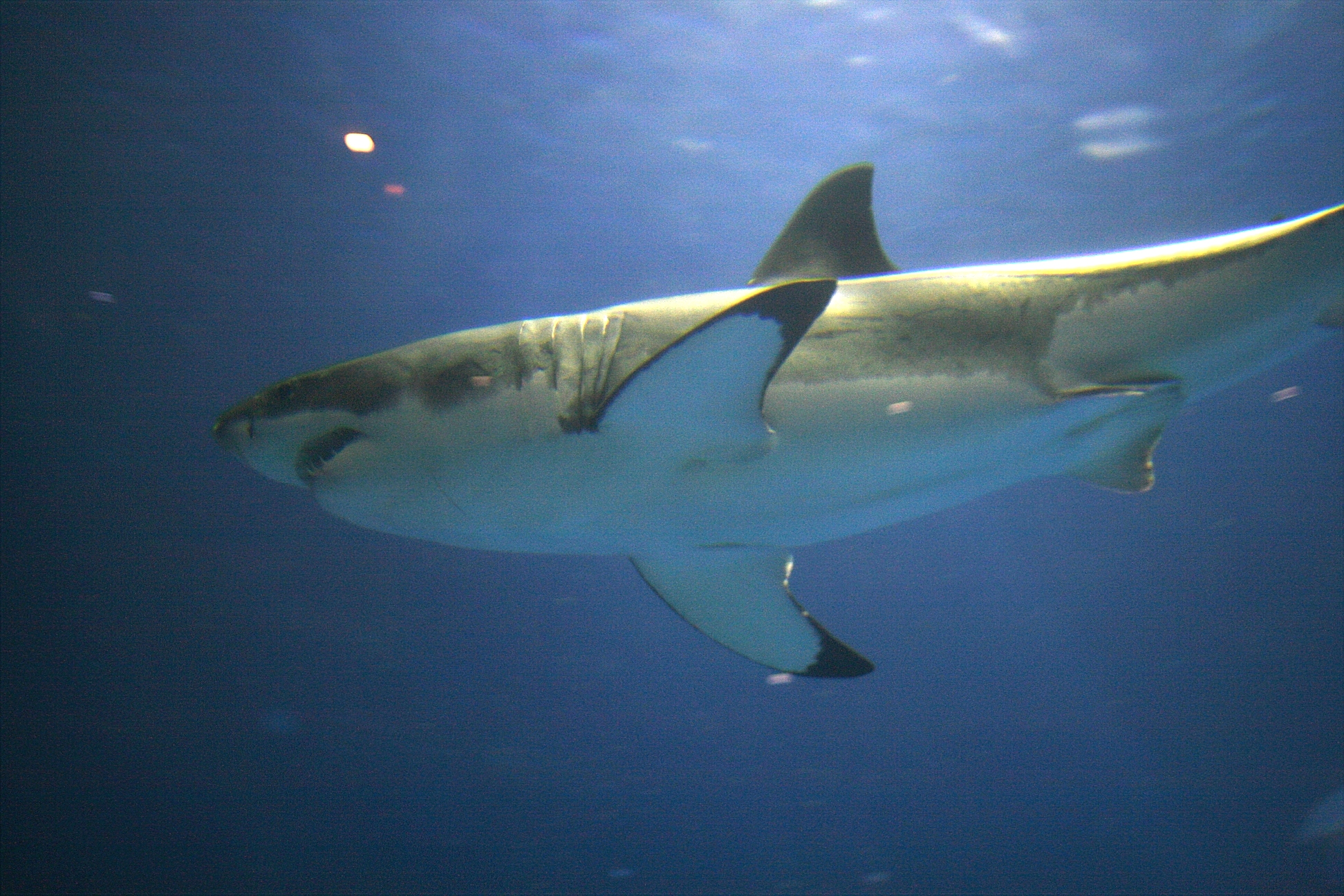
A juvenile great white shark swims in the aquarium's Open Sea exhibit in 2006.

In 1984, Monterey Bay Aquarium's first attempt to display a great white shark lasted 11 days, ending when the shark died because it did not eat. Through a later program named Project White Shark, six white sharks were exhibited between 2004 and 2011 in the Open Sea community exhibit, which was constructed in the 1990s. Researchers at universities in California attributed the aquarium's success at exhibiting white sharks to the use of a 4-million-US-gallon (15,000,000 L) net pen, which gave the sharks time to recover from capture prior to transport. A 3,200-US-gallon (12,000 L) portable tank used to transport the fish to the exhibit allowed the sharks to swim continuously, which they must do in order to respire. These endeavors led to the first instance of a white shark eating in an aquarium. (Note: "Oceans in Glass" 2006: event occurs at 24:21.)

At least one organization—the Pelagic Shark Research Foundation based in Santa Cruz, California—criticized the aquarium for attempting to keep white sharks in captivity, questioning the significance of possible scientific research and the ability to educate visitors. However, several independent biologists expressed approval for Project White Shark because of its logistical design, educational impact, and scientific insights. Regarding its educational impact, a white shark researcher from Australia stated in 2006 that "the fact people can come and see these animals and learn from them is of immeasurable value." The first captive white shark—on exhibit in 2004 for more than six months—was seen by one million visitors, and another million visitors saw either the second or third white sharks on display. In 198 days, the first white shark grew more than 17 inches (43 cm) and gained over 100 pounds (45 kg) prior to its release. (Note: "Oceans in Glass" 2006: event occurs at 49:40.) As of 2016, Monterey Bay Aquarium is the only public aquarium in the world to have successfully exhibited a white shark for longer than 16 days.

The effort to display captive white sharks ended in 2011 due to the project's high resource intensity. Captive white sharks also incurred injuries and killed other animals in the exhibit after becoming increasingly aggressive, and the final shark died for unknown reasons immediately following its release. Although no longer on exhibit for the public, aquarium researchers have continued to conduct research on white sharks. Collaborating with Monterey Bay Aquarium Research Institute in June 2016, staff scientists created cameras attached to harmless dorsal fin tags in an attempt to study the behavior of white sharks during their gathering known as the White Shark Café.

=== Seafood program ===
Monterey Bay Aquarium's consumer-based Seafood Watch program encourages sustainable seafood purchasing from fisheries that are "well managed and caught or farmed in ways that cause little harm to habitats or other wildlife." It began in 1999 as a result of a popular component of a temporary exhibition and has grown to consist of a website, six regional pocket guides, and mobile apps that allow consumers to check the sustainability ratings of specific fisheries. The program has expanded to include business collaborations, local and national restaurant and grocer partnerships, and outreach partnerships—primarily other public aquariums and zoos. Large-scale business and grocer affiliations include Aramark, Compass Group, Target, and Whole Foods Market. In both 2009 and 2015, Seafood Watch was reportedly playing an influential role in the discussion regarding seafood sustainability. (Note: Reynolds 2009: "with its advice on what seafoods consumers should eat and chefs should serve, the aquarium has taken an influential role in the debate over sustainable fishing practices.") According to the aquarium, the program's efficacy is driven by its work with both businesses and consumers, and is supported by the organization's expanding science and ocean policy programs. (Note: Spring 2018, pp. 159, 161–162)

In the late 2000s, Seafood Watch was likely the most known and most widely distributed sustainable seafood guide out of around 200 internationally. By 2014, fifteen years after its inception, the program had produced more than 52 million printed pocket guides. Its mobile apps were downloaded over one million times between 2009 and 2015. In 2003, the program's website was granted a MUSE Award from the American Alliance of Museums for use of media and technology in science. Bon Appétit magazine awarded its Tastemaker of the Year award to Seafood Watch in 2008 and, in 2013, Sunset magazine described it as one of "the most effective consumer-awareness programs".

In September 2016, the United States Agency for International Development announced it was cooperating with the aquarium to improve fisheries management in the Asia-Pacific.

=== Political advocacy ===
Monterey Bay Aquarium plays an active role in federal and state politics, from sponsoring governmental legislation about the ocean to persuading voter action from its visitors and online followers. The aquarium was a leading sponsor for the statewide shark fin ban in 2011. After the ban's success its efforts shifted to focus on marine plastic pollution, supporting successful legislation which restricted the use of microbeads in personal care products. (Note: Spring 2018, p. 164) In support of California Proposition 67 (2016), the organization produced advertisements, web pages, and podcasts in favor of a statewide ban on single-use plastic grocery bags. The aquarium is a founding member of a partnership between 20 public aquariums for collaborating on policy-based conservation efforts. This partnership, called the Aquarium Conservation Partnership, hosted a plastic pollution conference at Monterey Bay Aquarium in December 2016. In July 2017, the aquarium and other members of the partnership began eliminating their own plastic products, such as plastic bags, straws, and bottles.

The aquarium is a founding partner of the Ocean Project, which conducts national public opinion surveys about aquariums and environmental issues. (Note: Spring 2018, pp. 162–163) And, along with Stanford University, it runs an organization involved in ocean science, policy, and law called the Center for Ocean Solutions. The aquarium has participated in several international conferences that focus on ocean policy, including the 2017 United Nations Ocean Conference. In March 2017, Monterey Bay Aquarium publicly endorsed the March for Science—a series of rallies and marches that occurred around the world on Earth Day the following April—and its penguins marched in their own miniature demonstration.

== Educational efforts ==
Each year approximately 75,000 students, teachers, and chaperones from California access Monterey Bay Aquarium for free. An additional 1,500 low-income students, 350 teenagers, and 1,200 teachers participate in structured educational programs throughout the year. Between 1984 and 2014, the aquarium hosted more than 2 million students. In 2009, the aquarium and others collaborated to create an online resource called "Climate Interpreter", which is used by other zoological institutions, government agencies, and academic institutions to share materials for interpreting climate change to the public. (Note: Spring 2018, p. 158)

The Bechtel Family Center for Ocean Education and Leadership, a 13,000-square-foot (1,200 m^{2}) facility, was proposed in 2018 with an initial estimated construction cost of US$30 million. Upon completion, the total cost rose to US$42 million. The center has doubled the number of students and teachers the aquarium can serve annually. Monterey Bay Aquarium received a Webby Award in 2000 for "distributing information related to scientific exploration" and has won four awards from the Association of Zoos and Aquariums for its programs in the categories of education and diversity. In 2015, the Silicon Valley Business Journal awarded the aquarium with a Community Impact Award for its efforts to "shape a new generation of ocean conservation leaders."

== Community and economic influence ==
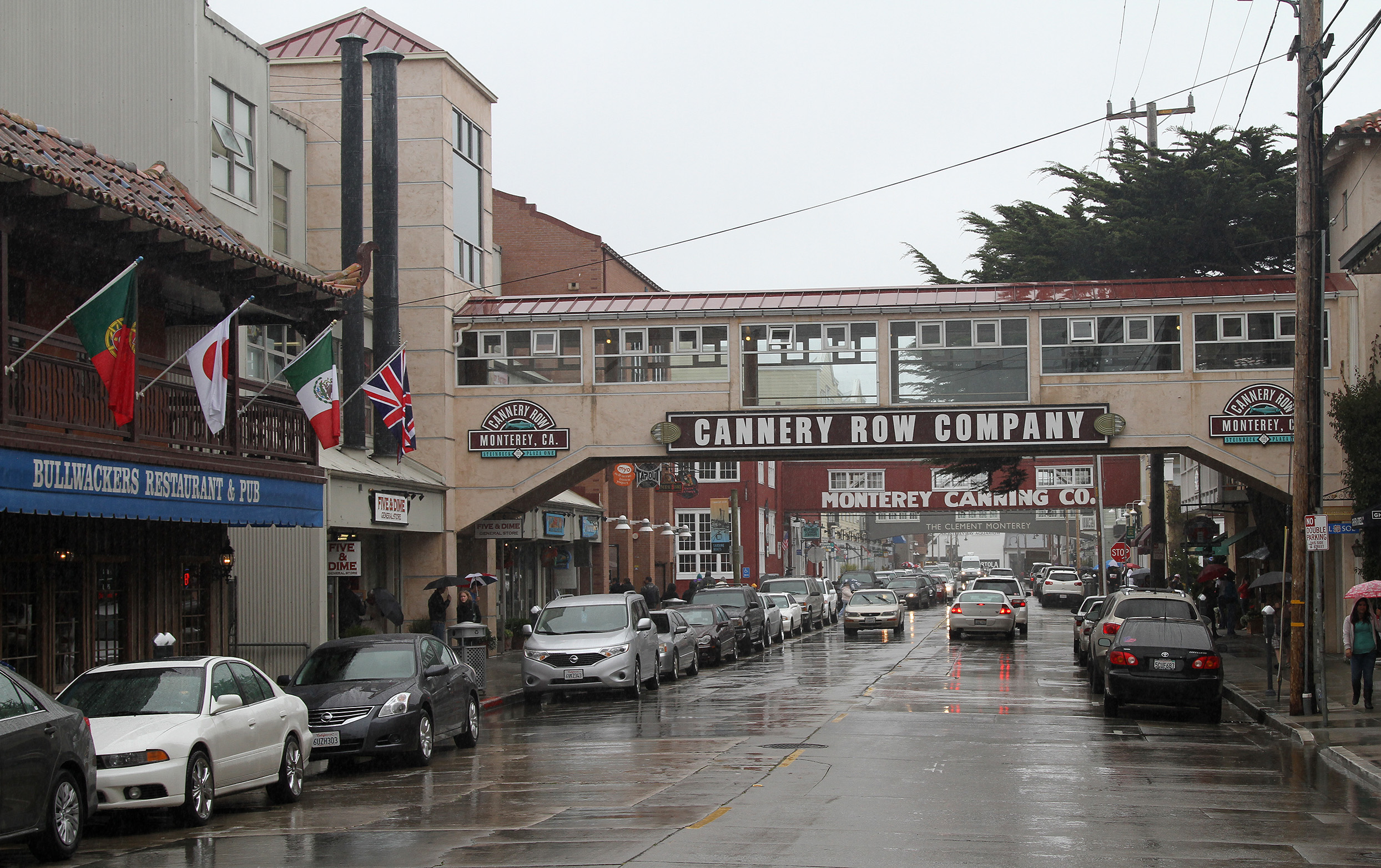
The aquarium revitalized Monterey's Cannery Row when it opened in 1984, following the decline of the sardine canning industry in the United States. (Note: Duggan 2013: "The area went into decline until the 1984 opening of the Monterey Bay Aquarium, which brought new life to Cannery Row.")

Monterey Bay Aquarium employed over 500 people and had 1,200 active volunteers in 2015. Between 1984 and 2014, 8,500 volunteers donated 3.2 million community service hours. The aquarium attracts around 2 million visitors each year and, through 2016, over 50 million people had visited. Out of the 51 accredited public aquariums in the United States in 2015, Monterey Bay Aquarium's 2.08 million visitors ranked it second by number of visits, behind Georgia Aquarium's 2.2 million. In 2015, it served 290,000 annual members.

Free admission programs are offered for Monterey County residents including "Shelf to Shore", with the county's free library system, and "Free to Learn", with local nonprofit organizations and Monterey–Salinas Transit. Additionally, the aquarium offers free admission to Monterey County residents during a weeklong event in December, which grew from almost 17,000 visitors in 1998 to 50,000 visitors in 2013. In 2014, the program was expanded to include neighboring Santa Cruz and San Benito counties. An annual event called "Día del Niño" offers bilingual feeding presentations (in Spanish), activities, and free admission for children under the age of 13. Between 2002 and 2014, over 700,000 people visited for free through outreach programs.

In 2013, the aquarium's operational spending and its 2 million visitors generated US$263 million to the economy of Monterey County. In August 2016, an event during one evening raised over US$110,000 for the Community Foundation for Monterey County's drive to provide relief for the Soberanes Fire.

In December 2020, Natividad Medical Center in Salinas was loaned a deep-freeze fridge from the Aquarium in order to allow the hospital to store the Pfizer–BioNTech COVID-19 vaccine at -94 degrees Fahrenheit. Normally the aquarium uses the freezer for preserving "biological and veterinary samples". Prior to the loan, the hospital had planned on keeping the vaccine on dry ice which would have meant changing the dry ice every five days. Due to the aquarium's closure during the COVID-19 pandemic, between April 2020 and January 2021 a total of 243 staff were laid off or furloughed.

== In media and popular culture ==
Monterey Bay Aquarium has been featured in two documentaries on the wildlife television program Nature; filmmakers were given behind-the-scenes access for "Oceans in Glass" in 2006, and "Saving Otter 501" followed the aquarium's sea otter rehabilitation program in 2013. It also heavily supported and was featured in BBC's Big Blue Live, a 2015 live television miniseries about Monterey Bay that won a BAFTA TV Award in 2016. The aquarium served as the filming location for the fictitious Cetacean Institute in the 1986 film Star Trek IV: The Voyage Home. In the 2016 Disney/Pixar animated film Finding Dory, the aquarium inspired the design of the fish hospital that the characters visit, and its animals served as models for the film's animated characters. A scene from the HBO miniseries Big Little Lies, which aired in 2017, was filmed there.

After comparing the aquarium's visitor feedback to the feedback of other attractions, the media and the travel industry have given it top awards. In 2014, TripAdvisor ranked it as the number one public aquarium in the world and, in 2015, it ranked second. In 2015, it was listed by Parents magazine as the top public aquarium in the United States and the highest rated destination on the West Coast. Frommer's travel guide lists Monterey Bay Aquarium as "exceptional", the highest rating on its three-tier system.

Each year since 2019, content creator DougDoug has held a Twitch livestream on the birthday of Monterey Bay Aquarium's oldest sea otter, Rosa. The livestreams have raised a significant amount of money for the aquarium and, as of 2025, DougDoug and his community had raised over $1.62 million dollars for the Monterey Bay Aquarium.

== Sources ==
Books and journals

- Chiang, Connie Y. (2008). Shaping the shoreline: fisheries and tourism on the Monterey coast. University of Washington Press. ISBN 978-0-295-98977-8. OCLC 704517509.
- Palumbi, Stephen R.; Sotka, Carolyn (2011). The death and life of Monterey Bay: a story of revival. Island Press. ISBN 978-1-59726-987-2. OCLC 692205204.
- Spring, Margaret (2018). "Lessons from thirty-one years at the Monterey Bay Aquarium and reflections on aquariums' expanding role in conservation action". In Minteer, Ben A.; Maienschein, Jane; Collins, James P. (eds.). The ark and beyond: the evolution of zoo and aquarium conservation. University of Chicago Press. pp. 156–168. ISBN 978-0-226-53863-1. OCLC 1003854885.
- Watanabe, JM; Phillips, RE (1985). Establishing a captive kelp forest: Developments during the first year at the Monterey Bay Aquarium. American Academy of Underwater Sciences. p. 11. Archived from the original on August 17, 2016.

Audiovisual media

- "Oceans in Glass: Behind the Scenes of the Monterey Bay Aquarium" (Documentary film). PBS. January 22, 2006.

Magazines

- Brincks, Renee (2009). "An Ocean of Excellence: The Monterey Bay Aquarium Celebrates its Silver Anniversary". Carmel Magazine. Archived from the original on June 9, 2016.
- Gerfen, Katie (January 15, 2016). "The Monterey Bay Aquarium Wins the 2016 AIA Twenty-Five Year Award". Architect. Archived from the original on August 16, 2016.

News

- Beadle, Philip; Thompson, Vicki (April 20, 2015). "Exclusive: Monterey Bay Aquarium topped 2M visitors in 2014 — here's how the staff pulls it off (Photos)". Silicon Valley Business Journal. San Jose, California. Archived from the original on September 21, 2016.
- Cooper, Leigh (December 5, 2014). "Monterey Bay Aquarium's top 10 legacies, so far". The Salinas Californian. Archived from the original on January 18, 2018.
- Duggan, Tara (September 16, 2013). "Cannery Row offers hints of its history". San Francisco Chronicle. Archived from the original on December 31, 2016.
- McCabe, Michael (February 18, 1996). "Monterey Aquarium Goes Really Deep / Vast new wing will display sea creatures never before held in captivity". San Francisco Chronicle. Archived from the original on August 7, 2017.
- Parsons, Russ (May 13, 2015). "Monterey Bay Aquarium Seafood Watch turns 15". Los Angeles Times. Archived from the original on March 20, 2016.
- Reynolds, Christopher (October 18, 2009). "Holy mackerel, that's a great white!". Los Angeles Times. Archived from the original on July 29, 2014.
- Rogers, Paul (June 27, 2011). "Big tank at Monterey Bay Aquarium gets major face lift". The Mercury News. San Jose, California. Archived from the original on September 23, 2016.
- Squatriglia, Chuck (October 8, 2006). "Aquarium's habitat for a heavyweight / Monterey Bay creates a home for second voracious – but delicate – great white". San Francisco Chronicle. Archived from the original on November 23, 2016.
- Stock, Lynn Peithman (November 6, 2015). "2015 Community Impact Award Winner: Monterey Bay Aquarium". Silicon Valley Business Journal. San Jose, California.
- Thomas, Sandra (April 17, 2014). "Monterey Bay makes splash as captive-free model". Vancouver Courier. Archived from the original on April 20, 2014.
- Yollin, Patricia (April 1, 2012). "Monterey aquarium jellies jam to psychedelic beat". San Francisco Chronicle. Archived from the original on October 7, 2017.

Web

- Fong, Joss; Lee, Dion (July 8, 2016). "Why there aren't any great white sharks in captivity". Vox. Archived from the original on July 10, 2016.
