= World Ocean Network =

The World Ocean Network (Réseau Océan Mondial) is an international non-profit association of organizations to promote the sustainable use of the oceans. One of its motto is "Caring for the Blue Planet, you can make a difference!"

It was established in November 2002. Its office is in Nausicaä - The French National Sea Centre in Boulogne-sur-Mer, France

== Activities ==
- Co-sponsor with The Ocean Project of World Ocean Day on 8 June since 2003; World Oceans Day officially recognized by the United Nations in 2009.
- Partner with Association of Science-Technology Centers's IGLO initiative to raise awareness of the effects of global warming (International Action on Global Warming)
- Sponsored three international meetings of aquariums, museums and science centers on the ocean in 1999, 2002, and 2006
- Created the "Passport" of "Citizen of the Ocean" for individual commitment to marine conservation through daily actions.
- Launched "Mr Goodfish" campaign, to teach restaurateurs and chefs how to cook fish sustainably.
