= Nausicaá Centre National de la Mer =

Public aquarium in northern France

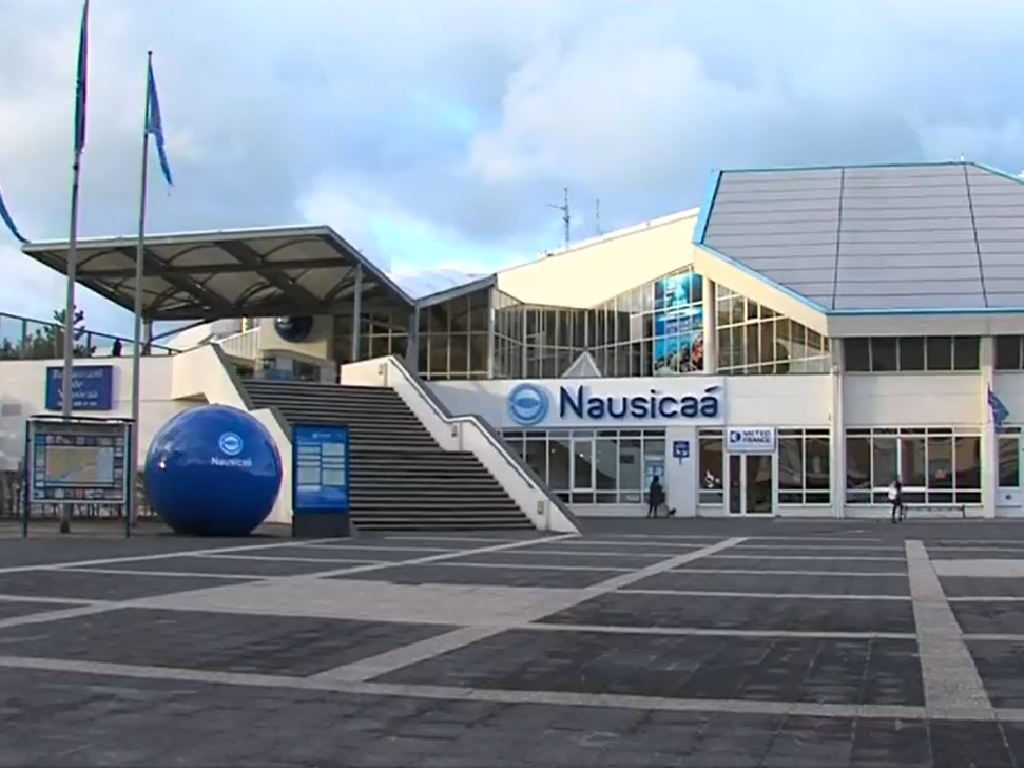
- Entrance of the aquarium
- Interactive map of Nausicaá Centre National de la Mer
- 50°43′50″N 1°35′37″E
- Date opened: 18 May 1991
- Location: Boulogne-sur-Mer, France
- Land area: 15,000 square metres (160,000 sq ft)
- No. of animals: 60,000
- No. of species: 1,600
- Volume of largest tank: 10,000,000 litres (2,600,000 US gal)
- Total volume of tanks: 17,000,000 litres (4,500,000 US gal)
- Memberships: EAZA
- Website: www.nausicaa.fr

Nausicaá Centre National de la Mer (French pronunciation: [nozika.a sɑ̃tʁ(ə) nɑsjɔnal d(ə) la mɛʁ]) is a public aquarium located in Boulogne-sur-Mer in northern France. It is the largest public aquarium in Europe (Note: L'Oceanogràfic (Spain) has also been called Europe's largest aquarium with 42,000,000 L (11,000,000 US gal) of water, but this includes a 26,000,000 L (6,900,000 US gal) dolphinarium) and attracts more than 800,000 visitors each year.

Nausicaa is described as a centre of scientific and technical discovery of the marine environment, focusing primarily on the relationship between man and the sea.

== History ==
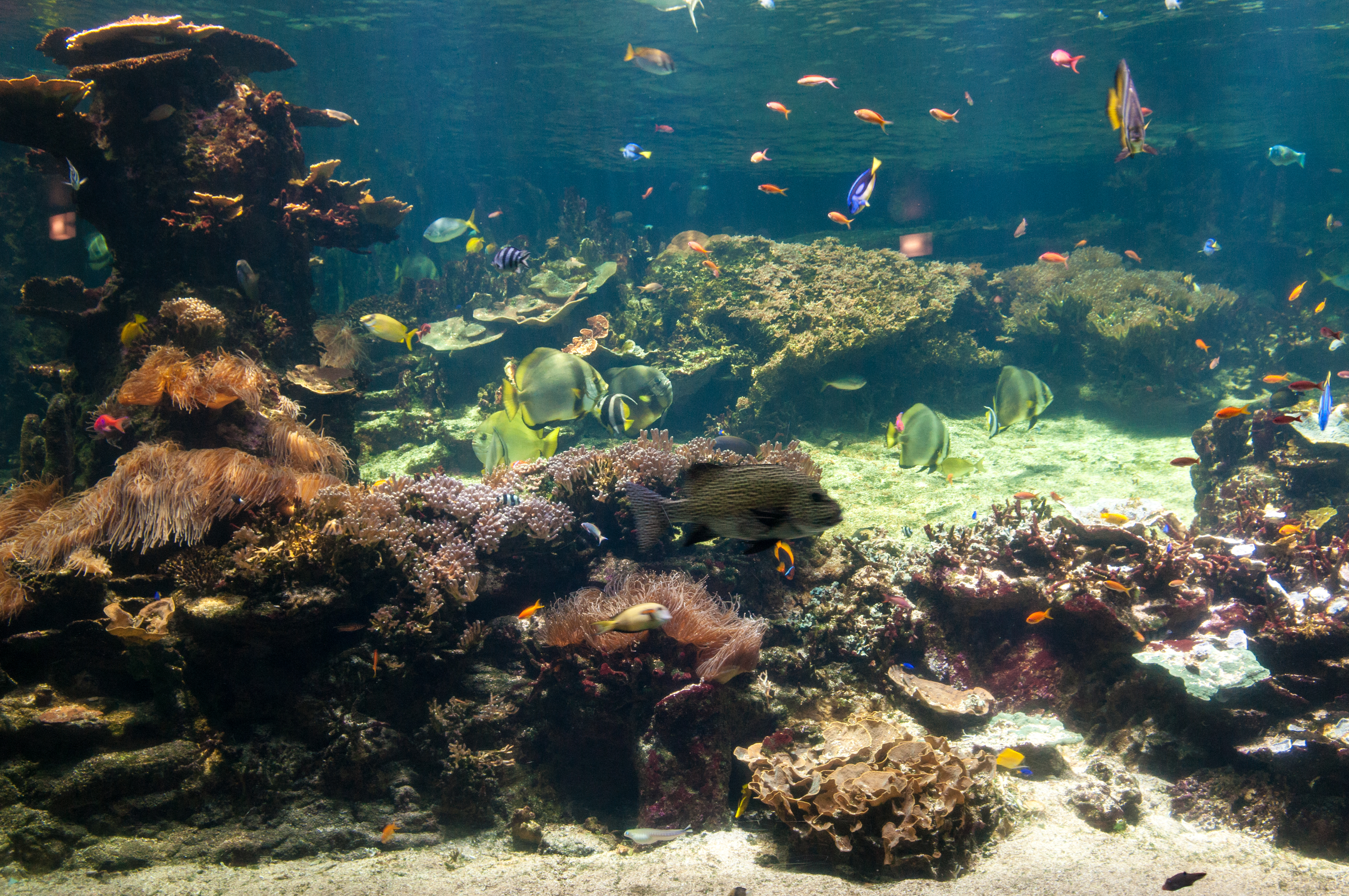
The main coral reef tank

The idea for the aquarium started when Guy Lengagne, then mayor of Boulogne-sur-Mer, wanted to repurpose an old casino. In 1982, oceanographers Philippe Vallette, Stéphane Henard, and Christophe Liacopoulos were tasked with a preliminary study, and eventually with implementing the project.

In 1984 a non-profit association was created for the aquarium, and Jacques Rougerie was selected as architect for the facility. In 1986 France selected the project as one of its major urban development projects and it was renamed the National Sea Centre. The European Union contributed half of the FF140 million required to finance the project, and bids to build the project were solicited.

Construction started in 1987 and was finished by early 1991 when the National Sea Centre Development Company was created. The centre was renamed again to Nausicaa (a Homeric princess from Greek mythology), and was opened on 18 May 1991. The first jellyfish arrived at the aquarium in 1994, and the first temporary exhibition, “The Sea and the Child,” was opened in 1995. The entrance hall is embellished by the large scale painting Corrida (The Matador) by Pascal Lecocq.

A major expansion of the facility in 1998 doubled the exhibition area to 4,500 square metres (48,000 sq ft) in order to add about 10,000 animals, including California sea lions, and a Tropical Lagoon Village with sharks and coral reefs.

In 1999, Nausicaa was designated a Centre of Excellence by the UNESCO Intergovernmental Oceanographic Commission for its outreach programmes. In 2002 it obtained the "Tourism & Disability" label, and the World Ocean Network was created.

2003 saw the arrival of the first spectacled caimans in the Submerged Tropical Forest. This space was incorporated into the “World House” in early 2005, which aims to make people think about their consumer habits. In 2006 another expansion added space for a permanent exhibition called “Steer South.” The aquarium welcomed its first African penguins, though its first penguin hatching was not until 2010.

In 2007, Nausicaa welcomed its ten millionth visitor. In 2008, it opened a new interactive multimedia exhibit called “Planet Nausicaa,” as well as exhibitions that focus on Madagascar and the Mozambique Channel.

In 2018, the largest expansion for Nausicaa in its history happened with a large new gallery named "The High Seas". This new gallery includes a huge 10,000,000 litres (2,600,000 US gal) tank for pelagic fish. In full, the new expansion increases the size of the aquarium from 4,500,000 litres (1,200,000 US gal) to 17,000,000 litres (4,500,000 US gal) in size. Alongside this development, Nausicaa also implemented advanced technologies to improve the visitor experience, including touch screens all along the paths, and an interactive mobile app with indoor geolocation capabilities, developed in collaboration with Wezit and Accuware. This app was the first of its kind in such an environment, allowing visitors to navigate the aquarium with ease and access enriched additional content about the exhibits. Meanwhile, the original exhibits have been grouped into a gallery known as "Mankind and Shores".

== Exhibits ==
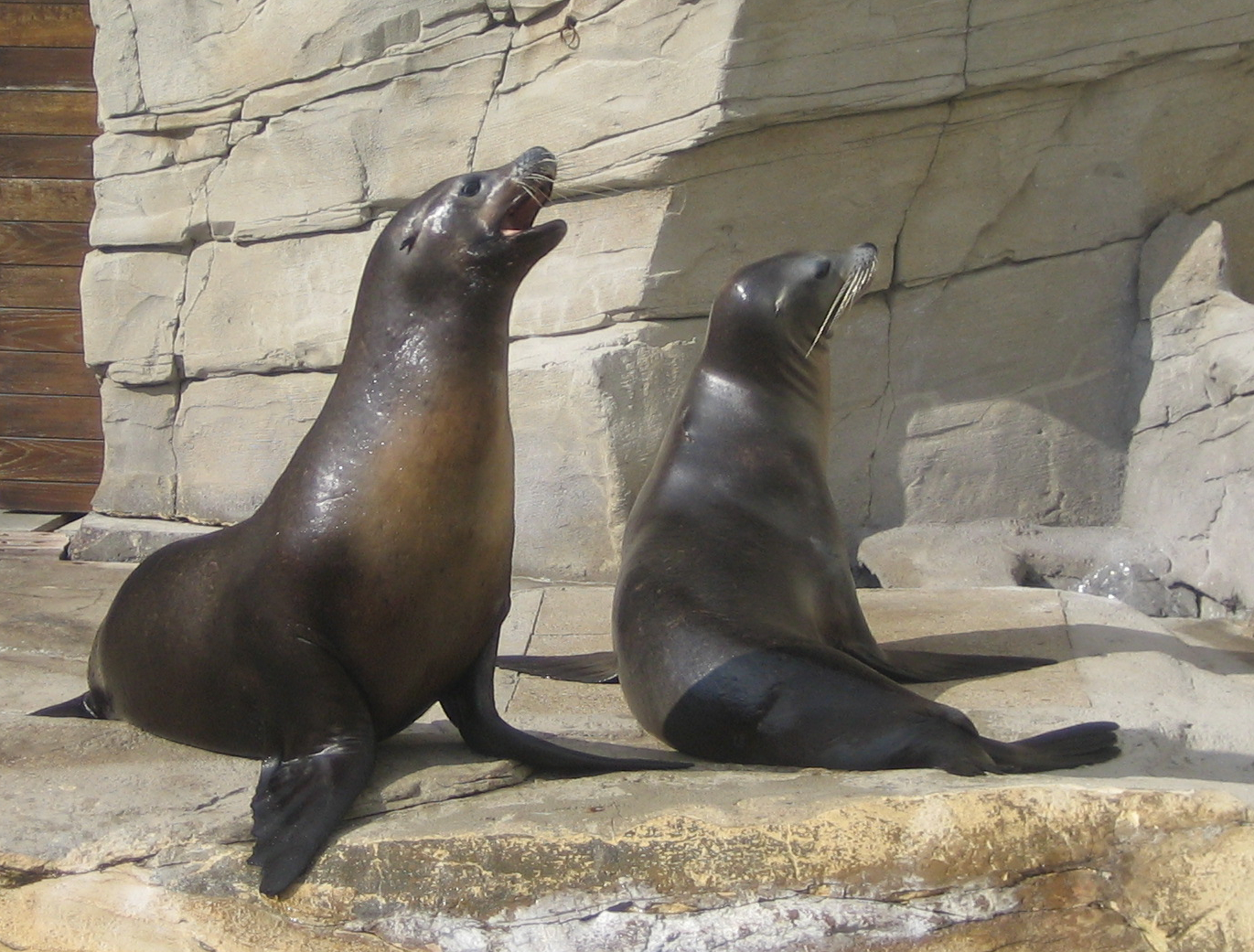
California sea lions

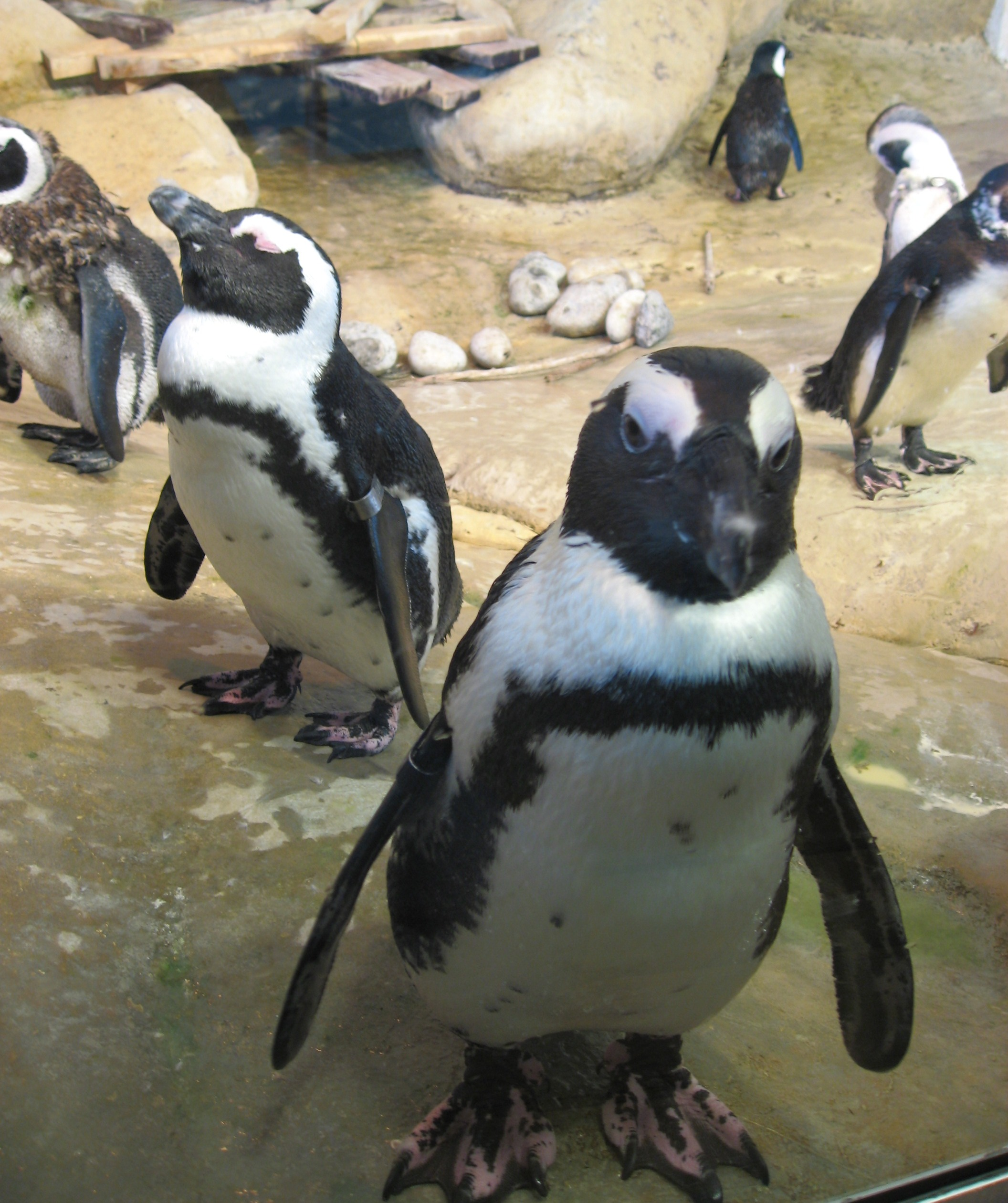
African penguins

Until the 2018 expansion, the exhibit area was about 5,000 square metres (54,000 sq ft), and included the following main exhibits:

- Shark Aquarium
- Tropical Lagoon
- Sea Lion Reserve
- Tactile Pool
- World Ocean
- Submerged Forest
- Penguin Beach

With "The High Sea" expansion that opened in 2018, the exhibit area tripled in size. "The High Sea" is centered on the huge 10,000,000 L (2,600,000 US gal) tank for large pelagic fish such as manta rays. The pelagic tank measures about 60 m × 35 m × 8 m (197 ft × 115 ft × 26 ft), has an 18 m (59 ft) long shark tunnel and a 20 m × 5 m (66 ft × 16 ft) viewing window.

== Animal medicine ==
In October 2008, Nausicaa worked with a veterinary surgeon who specialises in sharks for the first successful surgery on a grey nurse shark. On 14 November 2008, Nausicaa was awarded first prize for medical training in the care of sea lions at the IMATA (International Marine Animal Trainers Association) annual conference, which took place in Cancun, Mexico.

== Conservation ==
The aquarium is part of the European “Mr Goodfish” campaign (launched in France in 2010) in association with the Acquario di Genova in Italy and the Aquarium Finisterrae in Spain, under the aegis of the World Ocean Network. This project tries to encourage people to take an active part in preserving marine resources.

Several books have been published by the aquarium, including “Secrets des abysses” by Christine Causse and Philippe Vallette published by Fleurus, and “Madagascar, L’ile Océan” by Christine Causse and Philippe Vallette, photographs by Alexis Rosenfeld, published by Autrement.
