= Laverna =

Roman goddess

In Roman mythology, Laverna was a goddess of gain or profit and the underworld, who became associated with the protection of lower classes, refugees, and plans developed by thieves. She was propitiated by libations poured with the left hand. The poet Horace and the playwright Plautus called her a goddess of thieves. In Rome, her sanctuary was near the Porta Lavernalis, the gate on the northern summit of the Aventine Hill.

== Etymology ==
Several explanations have been given for the origins of the name:

1. from the PIE reconstruction *leh₂w-, meaning "profit, gain", which makes it cognate with the more familiar lucrum. This is currently cited as the most likely etymology;
2. from Ancient Roman writings latere (Schol. on Horace, who gives laternio as another form of lavernio, robber);
3. from lavare (Acron on Horace, according to whom thieves were called lavatores, 'washers', perhaps referring to bath thieves).

== History ==
Laverna was an Etruscan deity in ancient Italy, originally one of the spirits of the underworld. A cup found in an Etruscan tomb bears the inscription "Lavernai Pocolom," (cf. poculum); and in a fragment of Septimius Serenus Laverna is expressly mentioned in connection with the di inferi, the underworld. She was worshiped at many sites by the Etruscans.

By an easy transition into Ancient Roman mythology after Etruscan culture was superseded by that of Rome, Laverna came to be regarded as the protectress of thieves, whose operations were associated with darkness. She had an altar on the Aventine Hill, near the gate named after her, Lavernalis, on the northern summit of the southernmost of the seven hills of Rome. She had a sacred grove on the Via Salaria, the road across Italy that connects Rome to the Adriatic Sea.

Roman sources state that her aid was invoked by thieves to enable them to carry out their plans successfully without forfeiting their reputation for piety and honesty.

A sacred mountain in Tuscany entitled, La Verna, was the site of an ancient sanctuary of the goddess. This remote "Sanctuary of La Verna" was given to St. Francis by Count Orlando of Chiusi on May 8, 1213, and became the site where he chose to establish his religious order. In 1218, the Santa Maria degli Angeli chapel was built at the site.

== Popular culture ==
Her name is used for the main antagonist in the CGI animation Barbie: Fairytopia film series. Laverna is an evil fairy who is the twin sister of the land's fairy queen, The Enchantress.

In "The Murders in the Rue Morgue", Edgar Allan Poe's Dupin describes the ineffective Prefect of Police as "too cunning to be profound. In his wisdom is no stamen. It is all head and no body, like the pictures of the Goddess Laverna."

"Laverna" is an unofficial nickname for Otter 841.

In The Court of the Dead, a fictional version of Laverna appears as an antagonist.
