= Opal (sea otter) =

Sea otter at the Monterey Bay Aquarium

- Species: Enhydra lutris
- Sex: Female
- Born: 2024 (age 1–2)
- Nationality: United States of America
- Residence: Monterey Bay Aquarium
- Named after: Opalescence, representing her playful nature; voted for in an online poll.

Opal (born 2024) is a sea otter at Monterey Bay Aquarium. Found near San Luis Obispo, California, she was taken in by the aquarium after she was deemed unreleasable by the United States Fish and Wildlife Service. Her name was chosen based on an online poll in which 30,000 people voted. She was introduced to the aquarium on April 2, 2025. The aquarium plans for her to be a part of their sea otter surrogacy program, being able to help nurture sea otter pups.

== Early life ==
In February 2024, when Opal was three weeks old, she was found stranded near San Luis Obispo, California, 100 miles south of Monterey, California. She was rescued and taken in by the United States Fish and Wildlife Service and was deemed unreleasable. She was sent to Monterey Bay Aquarium, where she was cared for behind-the-scenes as a part of the aquarium's sea otter surrogacy program.

== Naming ==
On March 26, 2025, in anticipation for Opal's debut at the sea otter exhibit, the aquarium opened a poll to have people vote on what to name her. The three choices were Hazel, Opal, and Quinn, with each of these names holding meaning behind them, based on Opal's personality. Hazel represents wisdom, as the hazel tree is called the Tree of Knowledge in Celtic mythology; Opal is short for opalescence, representing her playfulness; and Quinn comes from the Irish word for "chief", representing her "confidence, protectiveness, and sassy side". The poll ran through March 27, and nearly 30,000 people voted, with the majority of people choosing "Opal" as her name.

== Exhibition ==
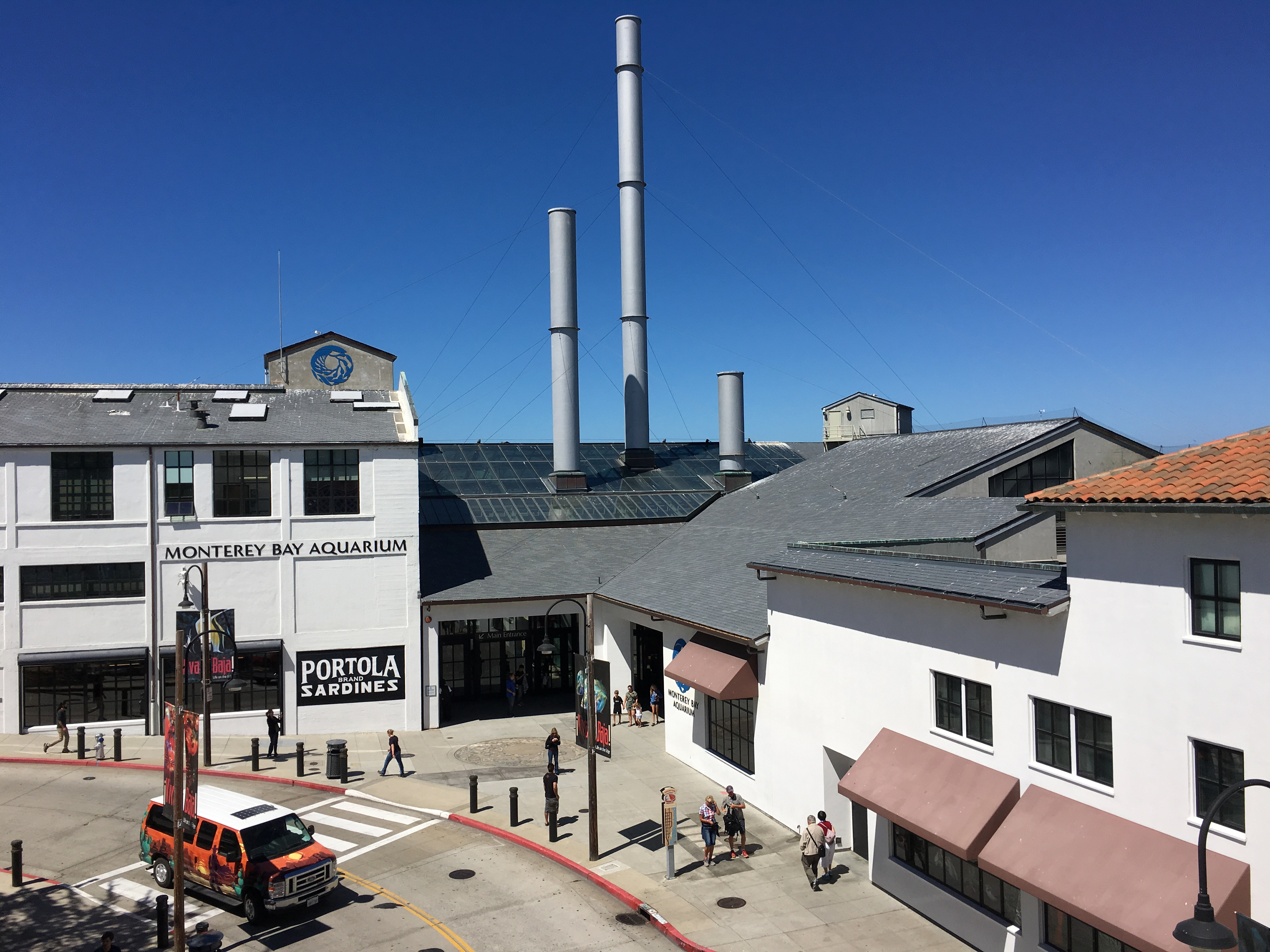
Monterey Bay Aquarium in August 2016

One year after she came to the aquarium, she was introduced to the sea otter exhibit on April 2, 2025. At the time of her debut, there were three otters on exhibit, being Ivy, Ruby, and Selka, with a spokesperson of Monterey Bay Aquarium writing "Opal’s sparkly personality quickly shined through during her training. The team was impressed by her confidence and how quickly Opal bonded with her new raftmates Ivy, Ruby, and Selka. Our precious gems Opal and Ruby are especially close".

At the time of her introduction, her baby teeth grew out and were replaced by her permanent teeth. Her new teeth were sharp, and she started to chew through the enrichment toys in the exhibit. Because of this, the toys were switched out with stronger toys meant for big cats like lions and tigers.

When Opal is old enough, the aquarium plans to introduce her into the sea otter recovery program, where she would act as a surrogate mother to other sea otter pups. Like other surrogate mothers, she would teach the pups the skills they need to be released back into the wild.

As of 2025, she can be seen on the aquarium's sea otter camera.

== See also ==
- Rosa (sea otter) – a former sea otter at Monterey Bay Aquarium
