= Rosa (sea otter) =

Sea otter at Monterey Bay Aquarium (1999–2024)

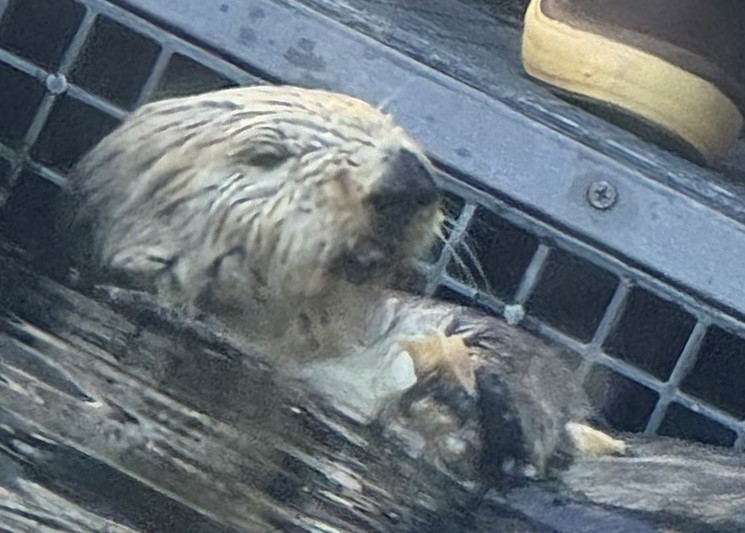
- Rosa in 2023
- Other name: Faye
- Species: Sea otter (Enhydra lutris)
- Sex: Female
- Born: c. August 26, 1999; Monterey Bay, California, United States
- Died: June 5, 2024 (aged 24); Monterey Bay Aquarium, California, United States
- Notable role: Surrogate sea otter mother and internet figure
- Residence: Monterey Bay Aquarium
- Named after: Rosa Martin, character from Tortilla Flat

Rosa (c. August 26, 1999 – June 5, 2024) was a sea otter at Monterey Bay Aquarium in Monterey, California, United States. She was taken in by the aquarium after being found stranded on a beach at four weeks old. She was released into the wild in April 2000, but was returned to the aquarium in 2002 after she continued to interact with people, posing a risk to herself and other humans. She was a surrogate mother for 15 orphaned otter pups at the aquarium and was the aquarium's oldest resident otter at the time of her death. Douglas Wreden, a content creator known online as DougDoug, hosted live streams celebrating her birthday.

As she grew older, Rosa's eyesight started to fail and she contracted a heart condition. She was euthanized on June 5, 2024, because of her health conditions.

== Early life ==
Rosa was a sea otter born in late August 1999, with August 26 considered as her birth date. She was characterized by her large figure, soft silver-colored fur, and white freckles on her head. On September 26, 1999, she was found stranded between Sunset State Beach and Manresa State Beach in Santa Cruz County, California. Sea otter pups cannot survive in the wild without their mothers, so she was rescued and brought to Monterey Bay Aquarium. At the time, she was approximately four-weeks-old and weighed 5 pounds (2.3 kg). She was rehabilitated before being released into the wild in April 2000. While in the wild, researchers at Monterey Bay Aquarium and scientists at the University of California studied her behavior, food intake, and body temperature. She was returned to the aquarium two years later because she continued to interact with swimmers and kayakers, which the United States Fish and Wildlife Service considered to be a risk to herself and humans.

=== Naming ===
Some otters at Monterey Bay Aquarium, including Rosa, are named after John Steinbeck characters. Rosa was named after a character from the short novel Tortilla Flat. The aquarium originally named her Faye. However, another otter was named Mae, and Faye was deemed too similar.

== Later life and death ==
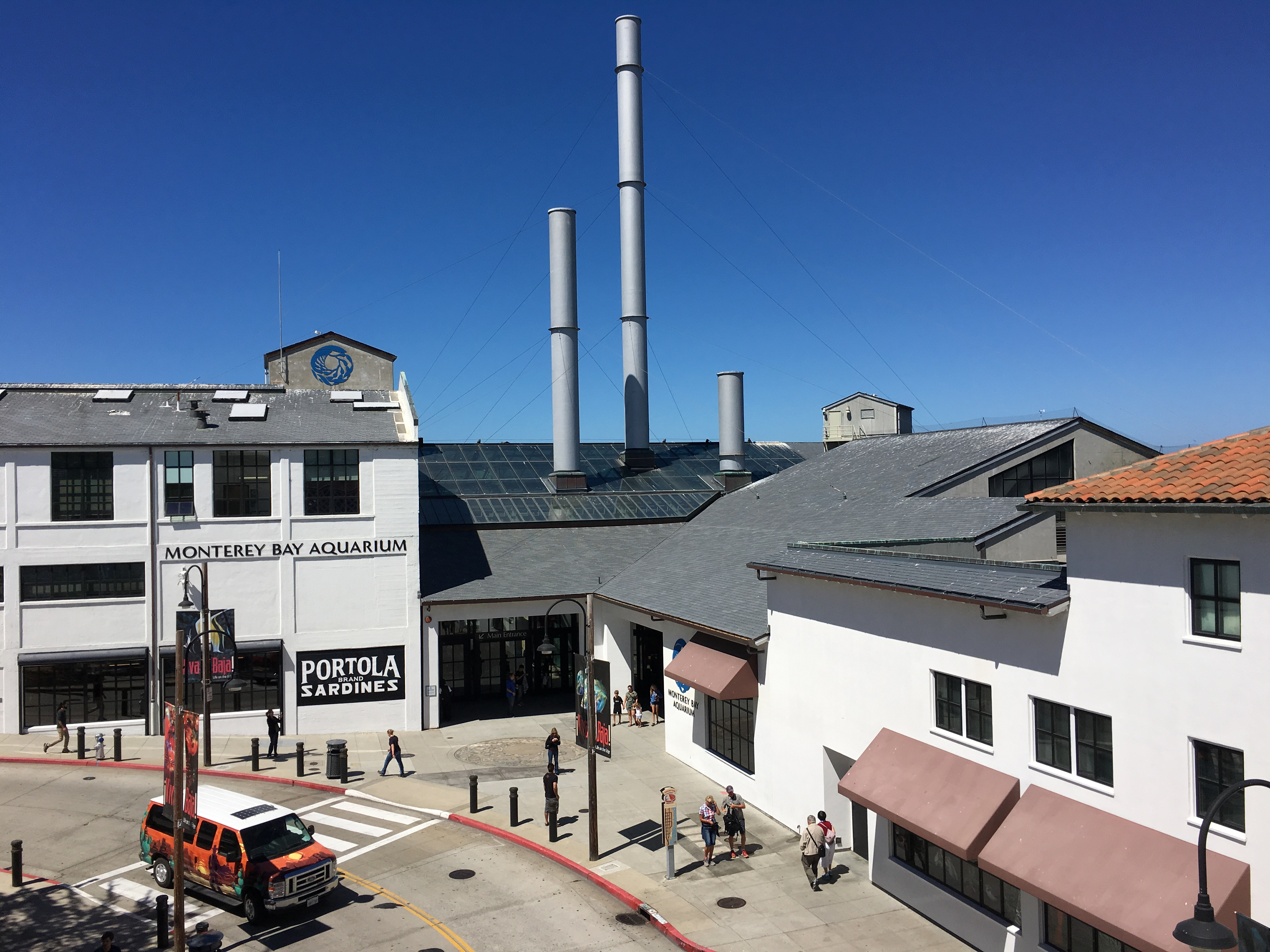
Monterey Bay Aquarium in 2016

=== Life at Monterey Bay Aquarium ===
Rosa was introduced to the aquarium's sea otter exhibit on June 6, 2002. The exhibit contains a pool of seawater, the quality of which is regularly checked by aquarium staff. She was fed four to five times per day. She could be seen on the aquarium's live streamed sea-otter camera, and after feeding she normally rested on her back on the water's surface at the exhibit's central window. She would usually have her chin tucked into her chest while wagging her tail. She would also swim with her head laid back. Around the time she joined the aquarium, a sea-otter recovery program was initiated. She was one of the first sea otters to be in the program, raising 15 orphaned sea otter pups before retiring in 2019; this was the most sea otters fostered by any surrogate mother at the aquarium. She did not have any biological pups. Her last foster otter pups were released into the wild in October 2019. Selka, an otter Rosa raised, stayed at the aquarium and participated in the recovery program.

Late in her life, Rosa contracted a heart condition and problems with her eyesight. She was groomed regularly by a health monitoring team who performed training sessions that accommodated Rosa's limits. Rosa received physical checkups three times a year that included radiographs, blood tests, and dental care. The aquarium staff built a ramp in 2013 to anticipate her developing arthritis. Her diet was adjusted based on her weight which was regularly checked. Rosa, like other sea otters at the aquarium, was taught behaviors like getting on weight scales, allowing the use of eye drops, sticking her paws up, and opening her mouth for inspection.

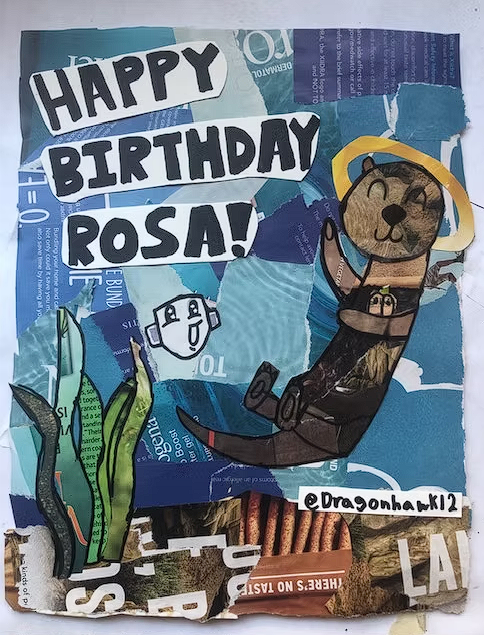
Fan art made for one of Wreden's art contests

=== Birthday ===
Douglas Wreden, a live streamer and YouTuber known online as DougDoug, hosted annual charity live streams celebrating Rosa's birthday. During a live stream in 2019, he found Monterey Bay Aquarium's sea-otter camera. After he discovered Rosa's birthday was approaching, he hosted a live stream to celebrate, with the proceeds of the stream going to Monterey Bay Aquarium. Many streams featured aquatic-themed video game challenges, with some featuring art contests where his viewers created fan art dedicated to Rosa.

=== Death ===
In the weeks leading up to her death, Rosa's health continued to decline. After a check-up, the aquarium staff determined her heath conditions were compromising her well-being, so they euthanized on June 5, 2024. She was the oldest sea otter at Monterey Bay Aquarium at 24 years old. Rosa was given a profile in The New York Times Magazine's The Lives They Lived annual commemoration.

Melanie Oerter, the curator of marine mammals at Monterey Bay Aquarium, described Rosa as "one of [their] most playful sea otters, and even at 24 years old, she would still be seen frolicking and wrestling with the younger otters when she instigated it". Oerter described Rosa as calm and patient, but defiant, saying that "[s]he would often just look at us or swim away". Aquarium staff members described Rosa's parenting style as "gentle, unflustered, [and] chill".

== See also ==
- Opal (sea otter) – another sea otter at Monterey Bay Aquarium
- Sea otter conservation
