= Flight 841 =

Flight 841 may refer to:

- Los Angeles Airways Flight 841, helicopter crashed on May 22, 1968
- Pan Am Flight 841, Hijacked on 2 July 1972
- Delta Air Lines Flight 841, a Detroit-Miami flight hijacked to Algeria on 31 July 1972
- TWA Flight 841 (1974), Terrorist suicide bomb in flight on September 8, 1974
- TWA Flight 841 (1979), loss of control on April 4, 1979
