= 841 Arabella =

Main-belt asteroid

Discovery
- Discovered by: Max Wolf
- Discovery site: Heidelberg
- Discovery date: 1 October 1916

Designations
- Pronunciation: /ærəˈbɛlə/
- Alternative designations: 1916 AL; 1928 DJ; 1930 YQ

Orbital characteristics
- Epoch 31 July 2016 (JD 2457600.5)
- Uncertainty parameter 0
- Observation arc: 85.30 yr (31156 d)
- Aphelion: 2.4129 AU (360.96 Gm)
- Perihelion: 2.0983 AU (313.90 Gm)
- Semi-major axis: 2.2556 AU (337.43 Gm)
- Eccentricity: 0.069749
- Orbital period (sidereal): 3.39 yr (1237.3 d)
- Mean anomaly: 71.2877°
- Mean motion: 0° 17^{m} 27.42^{s} / day
- Inclination: 3.7904°
- Longitude of ascending node: 354.733°
- Argument of perihelion: 120.347°
- Earth MOID: 1.11599 AU (166.950 Gm)
- Jupiter MOID: 2.63388 AU (394.023 Gm)
- T_{Jupiter}: 3.618

Physical characteristics
- Synodic rotation period: 3.352 ± 0.005 h (0.13967 ± 0.00021 d)
- Absolute magnitude (H): 12.92

841 Arabella is an asteroid belonging to the Flora family in the Main Belt. Its rotation period is 3.39 hours. It is named after the title character from Richard Strauss' opera Arabella.
