= Otter 841 =

Southern sea otter, (c.2018–present)

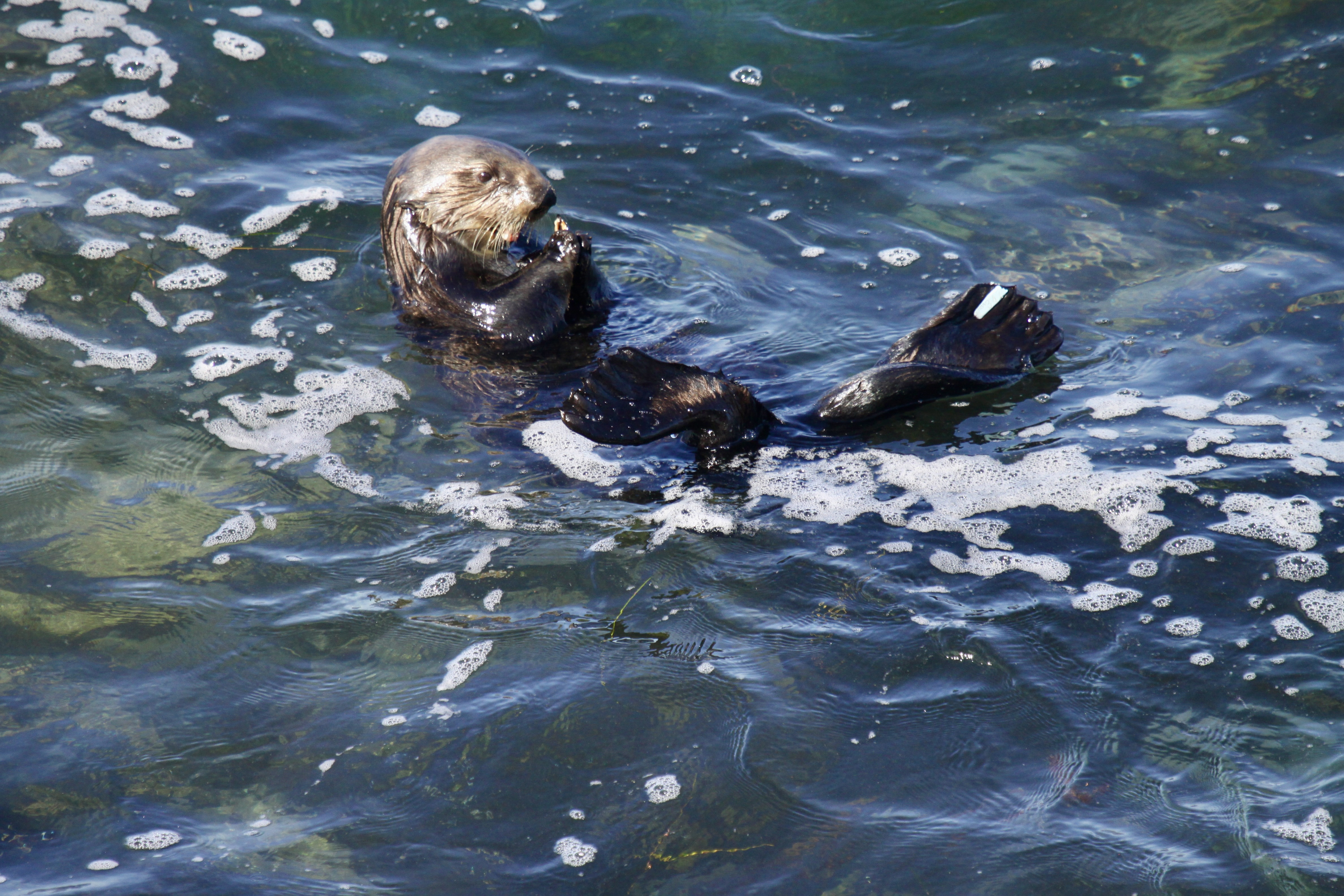
- Sea Otter 841 foraging in shallow water in Santa Cruz, CA
- Other names: Sea Otter 841; Laverna
- Species: Enhydra lutris nereis (southern sea otter)
- Sex: Female
- Born: c. 2018; Coastal Science Campus of UC Santa Cruz
- Known for: Unusual aggression and "stealing" surfboards by latching onto them
- Parent: Otter 723 (mother)
- Offspring: 1

Otter 841 (born c. 2018), also known as Sea Otter 841, is a female southern sea otter (Enhydra lutris nereis) who began attracting awareness of her aggressive interactions with surfers and kayakers off the coast of Santa Cruz, California, in mid-2023.

== Designation and nickname ==
Otter 841 does not have an official given name since by convention zoologists usually apply non-generic names only to captive animals, but she has been nicknamed "Laverna" after the Roman goddess of thieves.

== Early life ==
841 was born at the Coastal Science Campus of the University of California, Santa Cruz, and raised at Monterey Bay Aquarium by her mother, Otter 723, with minimal human intervention. In June 2020 she was released into the wild at Moss Landing Wildlife Area.

== Coastal California ==
=== Fame ===
Otter 841 became a folk hero in Santa Cruz and on social media, inspiring anecdotes, merchandise sales, and a children's book.

=== Motherhood ===
In October 2023, it was confirmed that 841 had given birth to a pup.

=== Disappearance and reappearance ===
After not being sighted again for several months, 841 reappeared in the Santa Cruz area in May 2024.

=== Possible imitators ===
In October 2025, incidents involving otters seizing surfboards resurfaced in Santa Cruz. It is unknown whether 841 was the perpetrator or if she inspired copycats as otters are known to learn behaviors from one another.
