= The Ocean Project =

- Formation: 2002
- Type: Nonprofit organization
- Purpose: Ocean conservation and public engagement
- Region served: Worldwide
- Members: 2,000+ partner organizations in 140 countries

The Ocean Project is an international organization that works to support ocean conservation and public engagement initiatives worldwide. It includes more than 2,000 partner aquariums, zoos, science, technology, and natural history museums (ZAMs), youth groups, and other education and conservation organizations, in 140 countries. The Ocean Project does not market itself, instead "supporting and highlighting" partners by broadcasting their "innovative conservation-related activities."

== Priority initiatives ==
=== Collaborative conservation campaigns ===
The Ocean Project works in partnership with ZAMs and others to develop, implement, and evaluate conservation campaigns. Program developed with NOAA, as well as other initiatives, including those supported by the Gordon and Betty Moore Foundation, the SeaLife Trust, and UN Environment.

=== World Ocean Day ===
The Ocean Project has been growing World Ocean Day since 2002 as a way to raise the profile of the ocean and rally the world every 8 June, with expanded involvement and action year-round. Under The Ocean Project leadership, World Ocean Day has grown from a handful of events in a few countries before 2002 into a global celebration of our ocean. The Ocean Project uses this day with the help of its network to promote restoring and protecting the ocean. Their Annual Report from 2019 shows more than 2000 events in over 140 countries throughout the year. In 2019, the campaign's theme was Gender and the Ocean, pushing for both ocean protections and promote gender equality.

The conservation action focus for 2023 was to call on world leaders to follow through on their commitments to protect 30% of our blue planet by 2030 and make sure it happens. The project is now recognized by the United Nations.

=== Youth initiative ===
The Ocean Project collaborative youth initiative helps to develop a broad, diverse, active, and united youth constituency for our climate and ocean. Connecting with zoo, aquarium, museums and other youth-focused organizations, the initiative seeks to accelerate youth engagement and leadership worldwide. The Ocean Project empowers youth to become ocean champions and provides opportunities to connect directly with policymakers and corporate leaders. Among The Ocean Project youth activities, the World Ocean Day Youth Advisory Council shapes and grows development of World Ocean Day and leads conservation action year-round. The Sea Youth Rise Up annual advocacy campaign was started on World Ocean Day in 2016, and is designed to connect youth from within and beyond The Ocean Project network and provide a platform for youth to express their ideas directly with decision-makers. The Ocean Project argues that "with nearly half of the world's population under the age of 25, it is imperative that young people step up as leaders at an early age."
