= S. F. Light =

American zoologist (1886–1947)

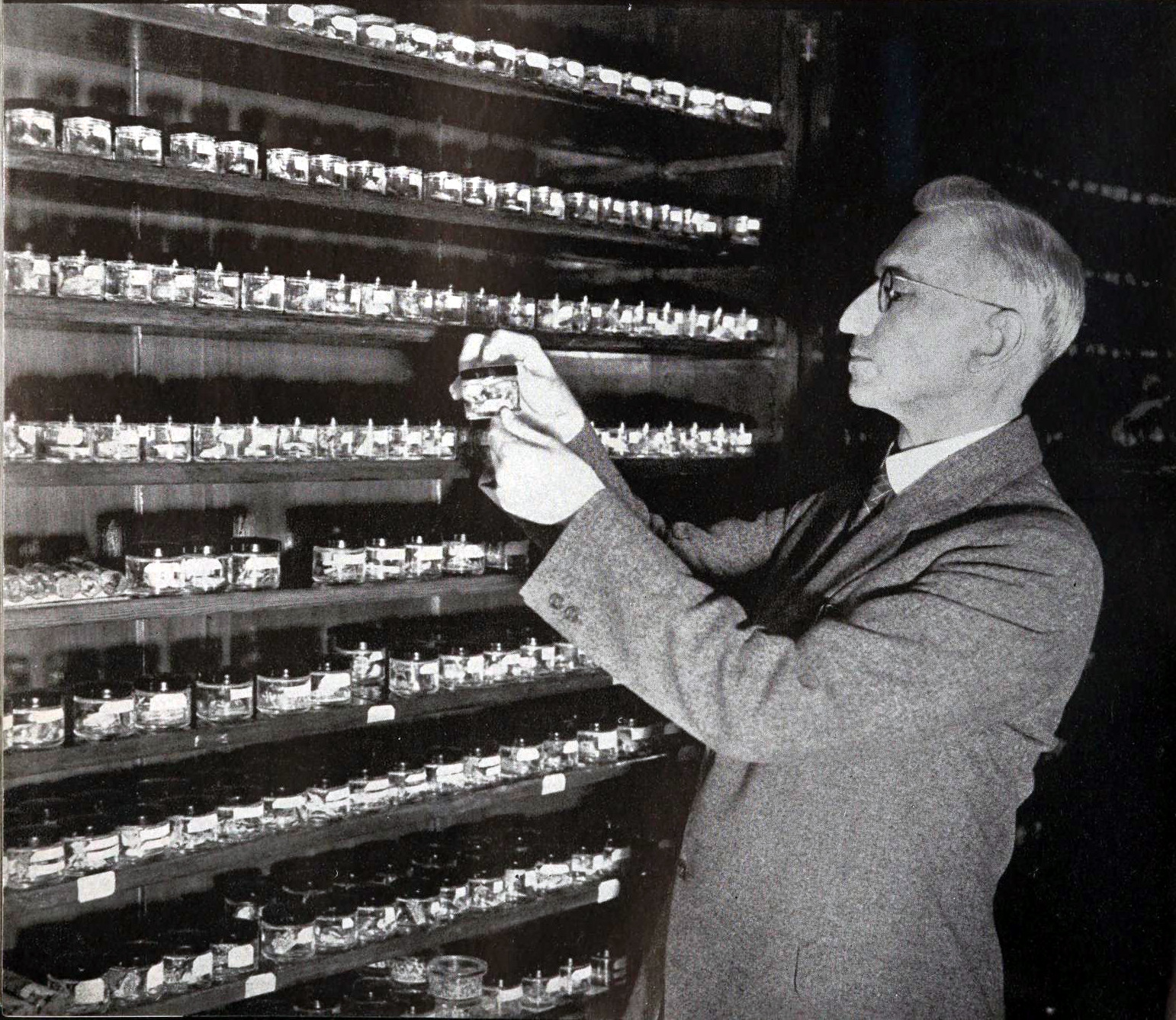
- Light examining termites, c. 1937
- Born: May 5, 1886; Elm Mills, Kansas, US
- Died: June 21, 1947 (aged 61); Lake County, California, US
- Education: Park College (AB); University of the Philippines (MA); Princeton University (MS); University of California, Berkeley (PhD)
- Known for: Systematics and biology of termites; Invertebrate zoology
- Scientific career
- Fields: Zoology, entomology
- Institutions: University of California, Berkeley
- Thesis: On Hoplonympha natator, gen. nov., sp. nov. On Metadevescovina debilis, gen. nov., sp. nov. (1926)
- Doctoral advisor: Charles Atwood Kofoid
- Notable students: Donald Putnam Abbott, Theodore Holmes Bullock, Olga Hartman, Joel Hedgpeth, Mildred Stratton Wilson

Sol Felty Light (May 5, 1886 – June 21, 1947) was an American zoologist, entomologist, and professor at the University of California, Berkeley, known for his research on tropical marine invertebrates and caste development in termites. From 1913 to 1947, he published approximately 70 papers, mainly on the subject of entomology. In the 1920s, he began teaching invertebrate zoology, expanding class field trips in the 1930s with five-week summer sessions at Moss Beach and Dillon Beach.

His class syllabus on zoology was originally designed for students at Berkeley, but were later published as an invertebrate zoology textbook and field guide, becoming the first compendium of marine invertebrates in the north central California coastal region for specialists working in the area between Hopkins Marine Station and Bodega Marine Laboratory. After Light's death, the book was edited, revised, and expanded by Ralph I. Smith and other contributors, becoming known as Light's Manual. After Smith himself died, the book was renamed the Light and Smith Manual in his honor.

== Biography ==
Light was born in Elm Mills, Kansas, on May 5, 1886. His father was Samuel Light, a Presbyterian minister, and his mother was Edith Frances McDill, the daughter of United States Senator James W. McDill (1834–1894) from Iowa. Other details about his early life are unknown. Light attended Park College, Missouri (AB, 1908). After graduating, he spent time abroad in Asia, where he taught for two years in Japan and two years at Manila High School in the Philippines. He went on to spend two years teaching zoology at the University of the Philippines, where he attended graduate school (MA, 1913) and participated in a marine survey at the harbor of Puerto Galera, Mindoro. From March to June 1912, Light and a team of researchers, including ichthyologist Alvin Seale (1871–1958), set up a temporary site, collecting samples for the department of zoology. They discovered that the site would be ideal for a permanent station. (Note: The area was later designated as a biosphere reserve in 1977.) Bullock notes that Light's early, productive work on coelenterates, octocorals, and true jellyfish (Note: Light, S. F. (January 1921). "Further Notes on Philippine Scyphomedusan Jellyfishes". The Philippine Journal of Science. 18 (1): 25-48.) arose out of his time in the Philippines.

Light became a full professor at the University of the Philippines, and finally chairman of the department until 1922. He took a leave of absence and obtained a second masters at Princeton University (MS, 1915). From 1922 until 1924, he chaired the zoology department at the University of Amoy (now Xiamen University) in China. While there, he published an article in Science about lancelet (amphioxus) fisheries, surprising scientists who had previously believed the fish to be rare in the region. According to science historian Christine Yi Lai Luk, George Sarton (1884–1956), the founder of the history of science discipline, was so impressed by Light's paper that he cited it in his 1924 critical bibliography. That same year, Light returned to the U.S. to study termites, becoming a James M. Goewey Fellow two years later at the University of California, Berkeley, where he received his doctorate under professor Charles Atwood Kofoid on termite flagellates (PhD, 1926). In 1928, he worked with the Termite Investigations Committee, a joint University of California and private industry project working to control the insect's impact. As part of the committee, he served as chairman on the subcommittee on publicity, as vice-chair on biology, and chair on the advisory council. The American Association for the Advancement of Science (AAAS) said Light had an important role on this project in late 1929. That same year, Light was made full professor. His contributions to Termites and Termite Control (1934), written in collaboration with Kofoid, and his 1935 study on termite colony castes, established him as an expert in his field.

In the 1930s, Light began teaching marine zoology and holding five-week summer courses and field trips to Moss Beach and Dillon Beach. From these classes, he developed a syllabus in 1937 which evolved into an invertebrate zoology textbook and field guide, later publishing it in book form as the Laboratory and Field Text in Invertebrate Zoology (1941). The Southern California Association of Marine Invertebrate Taxonomists (SCAMIT) recognizes the book as "the first reasonably comprehensive treatment of marine invertebrates" in the north central California coastal region. Marine ecologist James T. Carlton notes that Light's Manual was originally designed for specialists working in the area between Hopkins Marine Station and Bodega Marine Laboratory.

On June 21, 1947, Light accidentally drowned (Note: "California Death Index, 1940-1997," database, FamilySearch (26 November 2014), Sol F Light, 21 Jun 1947; Department of Public Health Services, Sacramento.) in Clear Lake, while fishing on summer vacation. Until his death, Light served as professor of zoology at Berkeley for 22 years.

== Personal life ==
Light married Mary Nexbitt Holdcroft on January 1, 1925. He was known for his conservative demeanor, always appearing in full business suits while on field trips at the beach, only changing his shoes for rubber boots. Light disliked using "Sol Felty" as part of his full name; His students knew him as "Dr. Light", while his wife referred to him only as "S. F. Light" after he died. Former student Joel Hedgpeth remembers that he "always signed himself S. F. Light, or S. F. L. He obviously didn't care much for what his parents had done for him...So sometimes, we use those terms, being overfamiliar in our behind-his-back sort of references." Light was quietly active (Note: Hedgpeth 1952: "...I do remember [Light's] startled glance when, as a vestryman, he ushered me to a seat in the church at Berkeley of which, following their chairman's lead, a number of zoologists were staunch members. There was indeed something more than words can express to that brief encounter on a Sunday morning—perhaps because it was never alluded to afterwards—the feeling that perhaps I had caught my professor out at something he was not sure his students should know about him, as well as amazement that I should tum up. He almost forgot to give me a program.") in the Christian community and belonged to the First Congregational Church of Berkeley, where he was a vestryman. The church was popular with zoologists, with Light's doctoral advisor Charles Atwood Kofoid and colleague Richard M. Eakin notable members. (Note: See the "Charles Atwood Kofoid (1865-1947) Biography" at the UCSD Library and the press release "Richard M. Eakin, a zoology professor who enthralled UC Berkeley students with costumed lectures, is dead at 89" from the University of California at Berkeley Public Information Office.)

== Legacy ==
Light's former student, neuroscientist Theodore H. Bullock, argues that his work and influence led his students at the University of the Philippines to establish the Puerto Galera Marine Biological Laboratory in 1925. In the 1940s, Light was profiled in American Men of Science as one of the top 255 practicing scientists and 37 zoologists in the U.S. He published 70 papers, many in entomology. After Light's death in 1947, his colleagues made note of his contributions to academia. "[His] whole life was motivated by great ability, high ideals, strict honesty, and real responsibility that helped to make him the great teacher and investigator that he was", wrote fellow Berkeley entomologist E. O. Essig in Light's obituary. Bullock, Richard M. Eakin, and ornithologist Alden H. Miller wrote that his "unique courses in marine zoology given at the seashore under difficult conditions...maintained standards of excellence unsurpassed by any center of instruction in marine biology in the country". Hedgpeth recalls that Light was referred to by others as an "inspired pedagogue" who "left his mark on virtually every institution of learning on the Pacific coast."

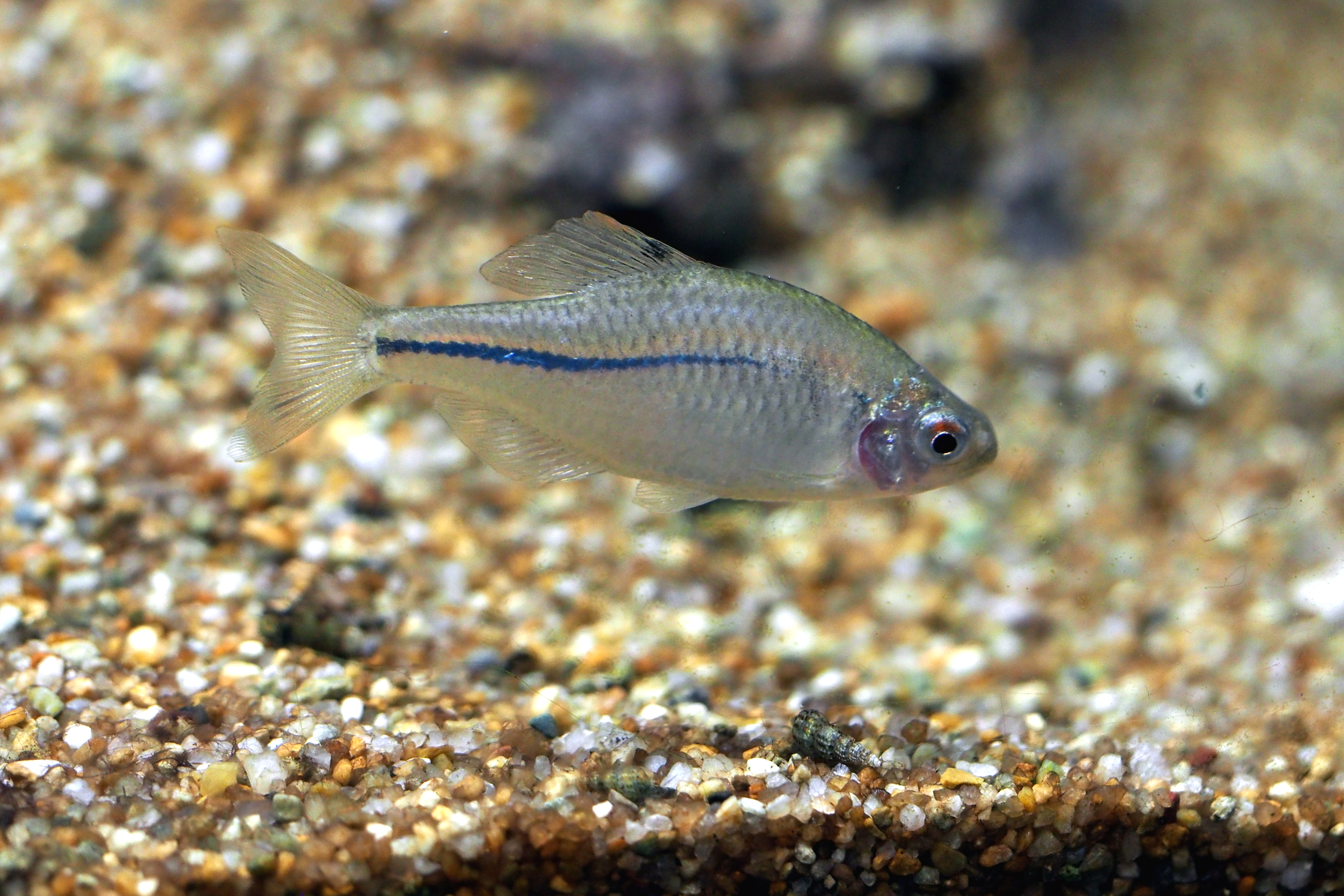
H. W. Wu named the Light's bitterling (Rhodeus lighti) after Light in 1931 (Note: Wu 1931: "The new species is named in dedicating [sic] to Prof. S. F. Light, Prof. in Zoology, University of California, U. S. A., to whom I have greatly appreciated for his constant help and encouragement in my zoological studies during the three years association with him in the University of Amoy.") and, in 1961, Meredith L. Jones named Lightiella, (Note: Jones 1961: "Dr. Ralph I. Smith and Mrs. Frances Weesner Lechleitner, who, with Dr. Hand, afforded me an indirect exposure to the research and teaching methods of the late Professor S. F. Light, Department of Zoology, University of California, Berkeley, in whose honor I am pleased to name this new cephalocarid.") a new genus of horseshoe shrimp in the coastal waters of the San Francisco Bay, after Light.

A group of students who studied under Light at Berkeley became leading authorities in their respective fields. These students include Olga Hartman (1900–1974), expert on polychaete worms, professor of biology at the University of Southern California; zoologist Mildred Stratton Wilson (1909–1973), who like Light before her, focused on copepods as a research associate of the Smithsonian Institution and the University of Alaska; Joel Hedgpeth (1911–2006), professor of oceanography at the University of California, San Diego; zoological systematist Paul L. Illg (1914–1998), associate curator at the National Museum of Natural History and professor of zoology at the University of Washington; neuroscientist Theodore H. Bullock (1915–2005), a pioneer in neuroethology; and Donald P. Abbott (1920–1986), professor of biology at Stanford University and teacher at Hopkins Marine Station.

Light also sat on the thesis committee at Berkeley. William C. Reeves (1916–2004), arbovirologist and professor of public health, recalls that during his Berkeley dissertation committee in 1943, the graduate dean chose Light to sit on the thesis committee as a "wild man", someone who could ask the candidate anything. Reeves had heard he was a "difficult" person. After the experience, for which Reeves earned a PhD in medical entomology and parasitology, he came away with the impression that Light was a kind man.

In 2010, Hanus et al. referred to Light's work on identifying insect pheromones in the reproductive inhibition of termites (Note: "Review: Experimental Studies on Ectohormonal Control of the Development of Supplementary Reproductives in the Termite Genus Zootermopsis (Formerly Termopsis)". The Quarterly Review of Biology. 20 (1): 93. March 1945.) as part of a larger body of "pioneering studies". A few months after Hanus et al. published their findings, Matsuura et al. summarized the state of research, citing Light: "In termites, which evolved eusociality independently of Hymenoptera, the existence of queen pheromones inhibiting the differentiation of supplementary queens has been suggested for many decades, but to date no active compounds have been identified."

== Light's Manual ==
Before Light's death, he acknowledged that the Laboratory and Field Text in Invertebrate Zoology (1941) was incomplete and in need of corrections. When he died, the first edition of the book was out of print. Editing and revisions were needed before it could be republished. Ralph I. Smith (1916–1993) spent years editing and revising the original book, publishing the second edition in 1954 with the title Intertidal Invertebrates of the Central California Coast, and the subtitle "S. F. Light's 'Laboratory and Field Text in Invertebrate Zoology'". Revisions to the new edition were made by Smith, Frank A. Pitelka, Donald P. Abbott, Frances M. Weesner, and other contributors. A third, expanded edition was released in 1975, with the new title Light's Manual. After Smith died in 1993, the title of the fourth edition, published in 2007, was changed to The Light and Smith Manual in his honor. The expanded and revised fourth edition includes coverage of California and Oregon with contributions from 120 scholars.

== Collections ==
- American Museum of Natural History (Note: Light's termite collection was partly absorbed by Alfred E. Emerson at the University of Chicago after Light's death. It was donated to the American Museum of Natural History in 1962 upon Emerson's retirement, where it resides today. See also: Snyder, Thomas E. (1949). Catalog Of The Termites (isoptera) Of The World. Smithsonian Institution. 112 (3953): 2. OCLC 609159301.)
- California Academy of Sciences (Note: In the 1970s, collections from Stanford University and the Hopkins Marine Station were acquired by the California Academy of Sciences. "The collectors comprise a kind of 'who's who' among pioneer biologists of the coast, including David Starr Jordan, W.D. De Laubenfels [sic], William Healey Dall, Alexander Agassiz, Libbie Hyman, S.F. Light, and many others, as well as specimens..collected by E. F. Ricketts...and John Steinbeck in the Sea of Cortez.")

== Selected publications ==
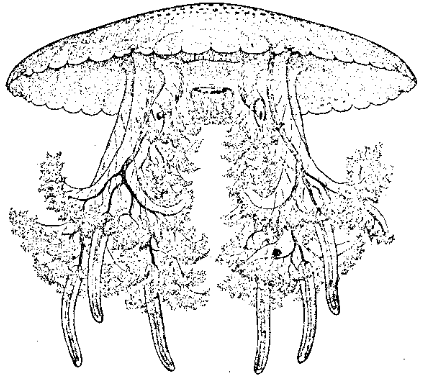
Drawing of the true jellyfish Anomalorhiza shawi by Light. It was first described in 1921 from specimens Light collected in the Philippines. A century later, research continues on this rare species.

Books

- Termites and Termite Control (1934). OCLC 971458799.
- Laboratory and Field Text in Invertebrate Zoology (1941). OCLC 7708655.

Articles

- "Termites of Western Mexico" (1933). OCLC 700896660.
- "Termites of Southeastern Polynesia" (1936). OCLC 1244125650
- "Experimental studies on ectohormonal control of the development of supplementary reproductives in the termite genus Zootermopsis (formerly Termopsis)" (1944). OCLC 3006143.

== Notes and references ==
Notes
