= Olga Hartman =

American invertebrate zoologist (1900–1974)

- Aboard the Velero III c. 1940
- Born: May 17, 1900; Waterloo, Illinois, U.S.
- Died: January 5, 1974 (aged 73); Los Angeles, California, U.S.
- Education: University of Illinois (AB); University of California, Berkeley (MA, PhD)
- Scientific career
- Fields: Invertebrate zoology Polychaetology
- Institutions: University of Southern California
- Thesis: Polychaetous annelids of the littoral zone of California (1936)
- Doctoral advisor: S. F. Light

Olga Hartman (May 17, 1900 – January 5, 1974) was an American invertebrate zoologist and polychaetologist. She was a student of S. F. Light at the University of California, Berkeley, and later a staff researcher at the Allan Hancock Foundation and professor of biology at the University of Southern California.

Active from the 1930s to the 1970s, Hartman specialized in Polychaeta, a class of marine annelid worms, and was known for her work as a cataloger and as a polychaete systematist. She is considered one of the top three most prolific authors in her field, having described 473 polychaete species during her lifetime.

== Early life ==
Olga Hartman was born on May 17, 1900, in Waterloo, Illinois. She attended Waterloo High School (1918), where she was the captain of the girls' athletics team, and on the editorial staff for Periscope, her high school yearbook, where she wrote about tennis. Her senior quote was a poem about having a variety of interests and skills. (Note: To find her equal you'll have far to seek; She's an all-around girl if you ever see one; In all she succeeds, from Basket Ball to Greek; In short, she's a peach, if ever there be one.)

After high school, Hartman did her undergraduate work at the University of Illinois College of Liberal Arts and Sciences (AB, 1926). Upon graduation, she began teaching at a private school, but the school went bankrupt after several years.

== University of California, Berkeley ==
Hartman matriculated at the University of California, Berkeley, and began her graduate work. In 1933, she attended summer classes and field trips on invertebrate zoology held by Professor S. F. Light at Moss Beach, just north of Half Moon Bay. Here, she first began studying polychaetes, working long hours with the other students, starting before sunrise in the reefs and tide pool habitat. After sunset, the students would often work until midnight indoors in the laboratory and in taxonomy classes held in Charley Nye's motel and restaurant. (Note: According to John L. Mohr, they sometimes worked 4 a.m. until midnight. Professor Light encouraged them to spend their free time on the beach observing the animals, but Mohr notes with amusement that they never had any free time due to the long hours of work and study.) John L. Mohr, Hartman's colleague and Light's former pupil, notes that Hartman was one of the oldest students in the class at Moss Beach, but also the most nimble on the slippery, algae-covered rocks. While most of the students would fall and bruise themselves, Hartman was one of the few who did not. "...Olga cavorted over them like a gazelle, leaping across channels and up and down the face of boulders covered with glistening algae, always searching for polychaetes, new and old."

She completed her master's thesis on the Revision of the California species of polychaetous annelids of the family Spionidae (MA, 1933), and her doctoral dissertation, under the supervision of Light, on the Polychaetous annelids of the littoral zone of California (PhD, 1936). Hartman also collaborated with Light on a paper that was later published in 1937.

Just a few years later, S. F. Light would famously publish the Laboratory and Field Text in Invertebrate Zoology (1941), (Note: Carlton 2007, p. xv: "Light's laboratory syllabi formed the foundation for the "Laboratory and Field Text in Invertebrate Zoology" published in 1941 by the "Associated Students Store" of the University. This constituted the first edition of what was eventually to be known as Light's Manual; a rich resource reflecting the central California biota of the 1920s and 1930s, this green paperback is surely one of the rarest marine biology books of the 20th century.") a textbook and field guide for his Berkeley students. The book would later become The Light and Smith Manual, which is still in use today. The original 1941 textbook gives special credit to only two people, Olga Hartman and Avery Grant Test. In the preface to the original edition, Light thanks Hartman for "contributing materially to this volume" and for "clarifying the classification of a group important in our fauna". Light goes on to specify the nature of Hartman's contributions, writing, "Dr. Hartman has devoted herself to that enormous, everywhere present, and extremely difficult group, the polychaeite annelids". Light then comments on how Hartman contributed to the manual "as student in the course, as teaching assistant, and as specialist". The lesson plan in the 1941 edition asks the students to refer to Hartman's thesis in the laboratory exercise dedicated to identifying Polychaeta.

== Polychaete taxonomy and systematics ==
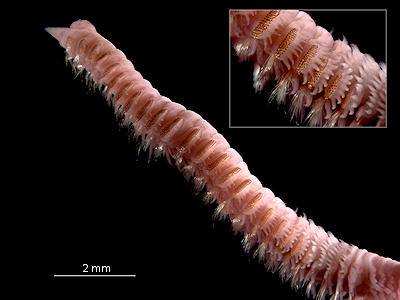
Orbinia sertulata. Hartman's work on systematizing Orbiniidae, a taxon of sedentary annelids, is considered "the most comprehensive and detailed work on orbiniids" to date, with subsequent revisions by John H. Day and James A. Blake.

After 1936, Hartman traveled around the world collecting specimens and spent a brief period working at different research institutions. She spent several months as a research zoologist at the Scripps Institution of Oceanography in 1937. Hartman received a Sarah Berliner Research Fellowship grant in 1939, allowing her to travel to study the annelid collections in Europe and the U.S. in preparation for a monograph on the subject. From June 1939 to May 1940, she visited and analyzed the collections at museums around the world, beginning with the Natural History Museum, London, followed by the Swedish Museum of Natural History, the National Museum of Natural History, the Academy of Natural Sciences of Drexel University, the Museum of Comparative Zoology, the American Museum of Natural History, and the Peabody Museum of Natural History.

In the summer of 1940, she worked at the U.S. Fisheries Biological Laboratory, Pivers Island, Beaufort, North Carolina, under director Herbert F. Prytherch. In her report on her work at Beaufort, The Marine Annelids of North Carolina (1945), Hartman describes 104 species of polychaetous annelids (the majority of which she collected), proposes new genera, new species, and revisions to known species, documents associations and commensalism, and includes detailed lists and notes about their habitat and range on the East Coast of the United States. Naturalist Harry C. Yeatman recalls that Hartman once told director Prytherch "that her work on taxonomy... of annelids was 'pure science' and had no practical value to mankind. 'There is no such thing as pure science,' [replied Prytherch].... 'Let's wait and see.' A year later... Hartmann [sic] was called upon to identify some annelids found burrowing into oyster shells and weakening them". She identified the culprit, a threat to oyster beds in Milford Harbor, Connecticut, as Polydora websteri, giving it a new name and description to differentiate it from P. caeca and P. ciliata. Hartman's description and morphological illustrations helped contribute to an experiment testing whether the worms increased mortality in infected oysters.

In 1966, Hartman published a comprehensive catalog of polychaetes in the Hawaii region based partly on data from historic expeditions in the early 20th century. These records were later discussed and expanded by Dale Straughan, Peter J. Vine, and Julie H. Bailey-Brock.

== Allan Hancock Foundation ==
Hartman moved to Los Angeles in 1940, and with a recommendation from Light, began working as a research associate for the Allan Hancock Foundation (AHF) at the University of Southern California (USC). She began by studying the collections of AHF expeditions of 1932–1937, with samples taken from the western coast of Mexico, Central America, South America, and the Galápagos Islands, publishing her work in volumes 7, 10, and 15 of the Allan Hancock Expeditions reports from 1939 until 1957. In the early 1950s, the AHF research vessel Velero IV switched from dredging in deeper waters, which limited collections to only larger species, to using bottom samplers to collect biological samples, giving Hartman new species of worms to analyze.

Expedition engineer Alex Campbell modified Peterson grab samplers (also known as the "Campbell grab"), allowing researchers to capture larger sample sizes. The collections taken from these expeditions in the 1950s, including the new techniques for sampling and the use of finer screens to filter samples, produced more new species than ever before to study. Hartman published her quantitative study of these collections beginning in volume 19. The results were influential for others engaged in the same research elsewhere and the sheer number of samples collected raised the status of the Polychaetes to that of a "dominant group of macroscopic benthic animals".

American zoologist Marvalee Wake was at USC at the time and remembers that while Hartman was still a research associate, Ruth B. Weg was the only woman at USC who was a biology faculty member. "It was not a good time", Wake recalls. "There were few women on science faculties in the early 1960s". Eventually, Hartman was made associate professor in the Department of Biological Sciences at USC in 1961. She was named university researcher of the year in 1966, an award now called the USC Associates Award for Creativity in Research and Scholarship, "the highest honors the university can bestow on its members for their distinguished achievements". She was the first woman to receive the award as a member of the faculty of the university. Hartman became a professor in 1967 and professor emeritus in 1969.

Over the years, she trained two notable graduate students, Donald J. Reish (PhD, 1952) and Kristian Fauchald (PhD, 1969). Reish went on to teach at California State University, Long Beach, for the next three decades. Fauchald eventually replaced Hartman as curator of polychaetes at the AHF upon Hartman's retirement. Even after her retirement, Hartman remained at the institution until her death in Los Angeles, on January 5, 1974. Two of her research articles, "Polychaetous annelids of the Indian Ocean including an account of Indian species collected by members of the International Indian Ocean Expeditions, 1963 -'64 and a catalogue and bibliography of the species from India" and "Polychaeta from the Weddell Sea Quadrant, Antarctica" were published posthumously in 1976.

== Personal life ==
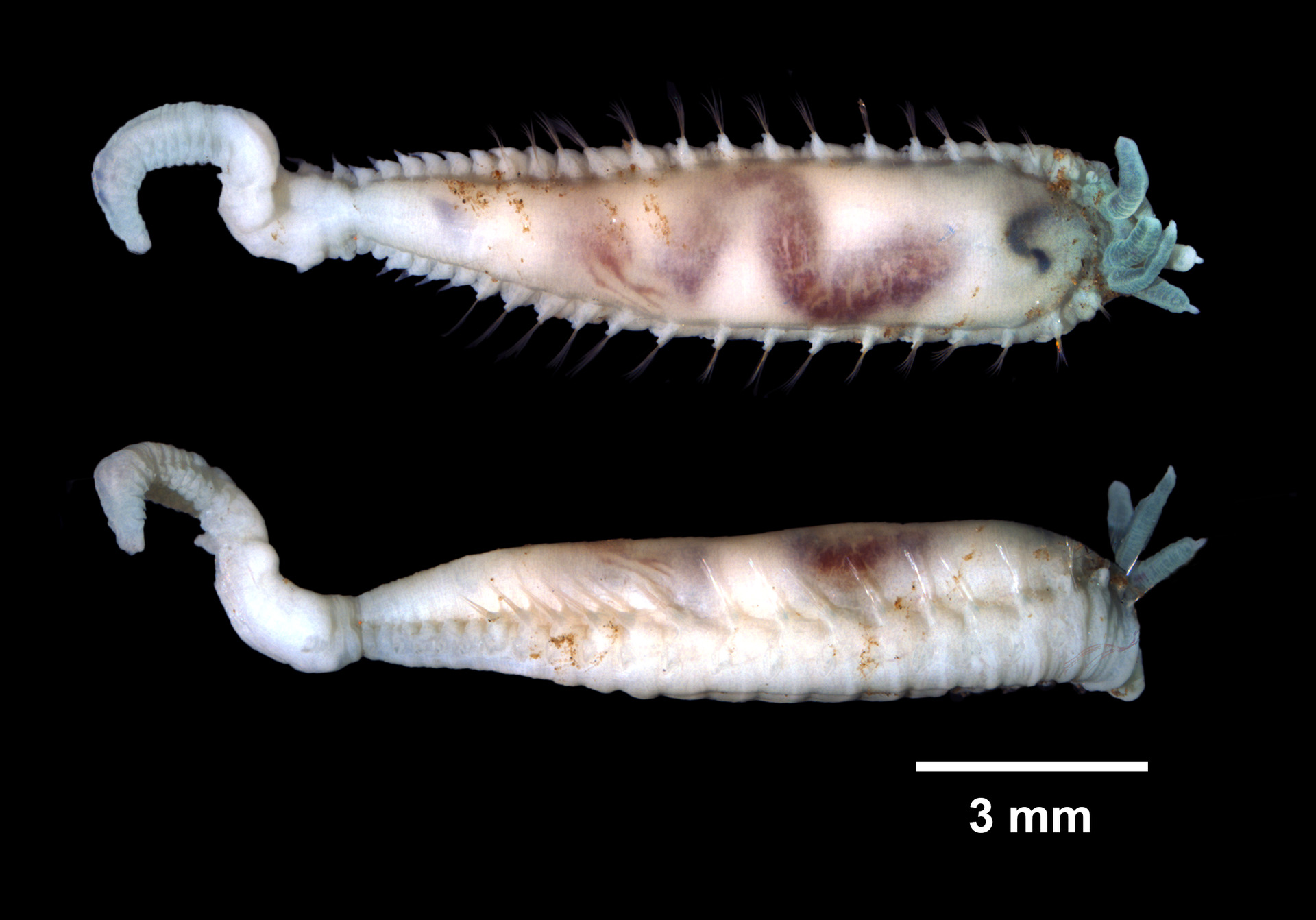
Hobsonia florida (Hartman, 1951)

Hartman never spoke about her personal life outside of her research on polychaetes. Her colleagues recall that she was so devoted to her work that she never even mentioned that she was married. Hartman was married to Anker Petersen and had one daughter, Dagmar. Petersen was the staff artist for the Allan Hancock Foundation in the 1950s and prepared many of the biological illustrations that appeared in Hartman's published papers.

Hartman destroyed most of her personal records before her death, so little is available about her life outside of her work for the Allan Hancock Foundation. In spite of this difficulty, the correspondence others received from Hartman survives. In 1983, the Southern California Association of Marine Invertebrate Taxonomists compiled these letters and began publishing them in their newsletter, primarily focusing on Hartman's travels and research throughout Europe in the early to mid-20th century, just before the outbreak of World War II.

In a series of letters in early 1939, she laments the difficulty in getting a passport for her trip to Europe, as it required a witness who knew her personally for two years, a person who did not exist as she had only just moved to Los Angeles. She writes about California wildflower season in April; an Allan Hancock Foundation Pacific expedition that encountered unusual indigenous people which baffled ethnologists; her colleagues who received fellowship grants like herself; and the impact of the worsening situation in Europe on her itinerary as she is just about to travel. Hartman took her sole index card catalog of polychaetes with her on her trip, and at one point was separated from the collection for a time; there were no known duplicates.

== Legacy ==
Hartman was active as a polychaetologist from the 1930s to the 1970s. She is considered one of the top three most prolific authors in her field, having described 473 polychaete species during her lifetime. Her work is mostly focused on the polychaetes of California, the Atlantic Ocean, and the Antarctic. Notable works include the Literature of the Polychaetous Annelids (1951), the Catalogue of the Polychaetous Annelids of the World (1965), and the Atlas of Polychaetous Annelids series (1968–1969). In 1963, she authored the entry for Polychaeta in the 14th edition of the Encyclopaedia Britannica. In 1968, American biologist Joel Hedgpeth reviewed three volumes of Hartman's work on Antarctic polychaetes, calling it a "monumental achievement from the doyenne of polychaetology".

In 1988, the University of Southern California transferred their polychaete collection from the Allan Hancock Foundation (AHF) to the Natural History Museum of Los Angeles County. The collection had been stored at the AHF since 1941 and was now the second largest in the U.S. It contains the entirety of Hartman's Polychaeta library and her eastern Pacific specimens that she identified, which are considered part of the largest collection of worms of its kind. The Handbook of Zoology (2019) refers to Hartman's cataloging as "an amazing achievement and remarkably accurate given its ad hoc construction from original handwriting". Kristian Fauchald later added Hartman's catalog to a taxonomic computer database and donated it in 2007 to what would become the foundation for the World Polychaeta Database of the World Register of Marine Species (WoRMS). (Note: "The World Polychaeta Database arose from a merger in 2007 of the massive World Register of Polychaeta compiled privately over many years by the late Kristian Fauchald (Smithsonian Institution) with the European Register of Marine Species (ERMS), and some other regional compilations including for Antarctic seas, which were already online. The database incorporates and has evolved from original cataloguing work of Olga Hartman at the Allan Hancock Foundation, published in 1951 (bibliography), 1959, and 1965 (catalogues & additional bibliographies).")

The species Plagiostomum hartmani was named after her in 1962 by Tor G. Karling, and Kirkegaardia olgahartmanae in 2016 by marine ecologist James A. Blake.

== Expeditions ==
- International Indian Ocean Expedition (1963–1964)

== Selected work ==
- Literature of the Polychaetous Annelids. Volume I, Bibliography. Edwards Brothers. 1951. OCLC 1848634.
- Catalogue of the Polychaetous Annelids of the World. Three Volumes. Occasional papers of the Allan Hancock Foundation, no. 23. Allan Hancock Foundation. 1965. OCLC 863334546.
- Deep-Water Benthic Polychaetous Annelids off New England to Bermuda and Other North Atlantic Areas. University of Southern California Press. 1965. OCLC 618067.
- Atlas of the Errantiate Polychaetous Annelids from California. Allan Hancock Foundation University of Southern California. 1968. OCLC 432681.
- Atlas of the Sedentariate Polychaetous Annelids from California. Allan Hancock Foundation University of Southern California. 1969. OCLC 71933.
- Deep-Water Benthic Polychaetous Annelids off New England to Bermuda and Other North Atlantic Areas. Part II. University of Southern California Press. 1971. OCLC 9075774.

== Notes and references ==
Notes
