= Stephen Palumbi =

Marine biologist

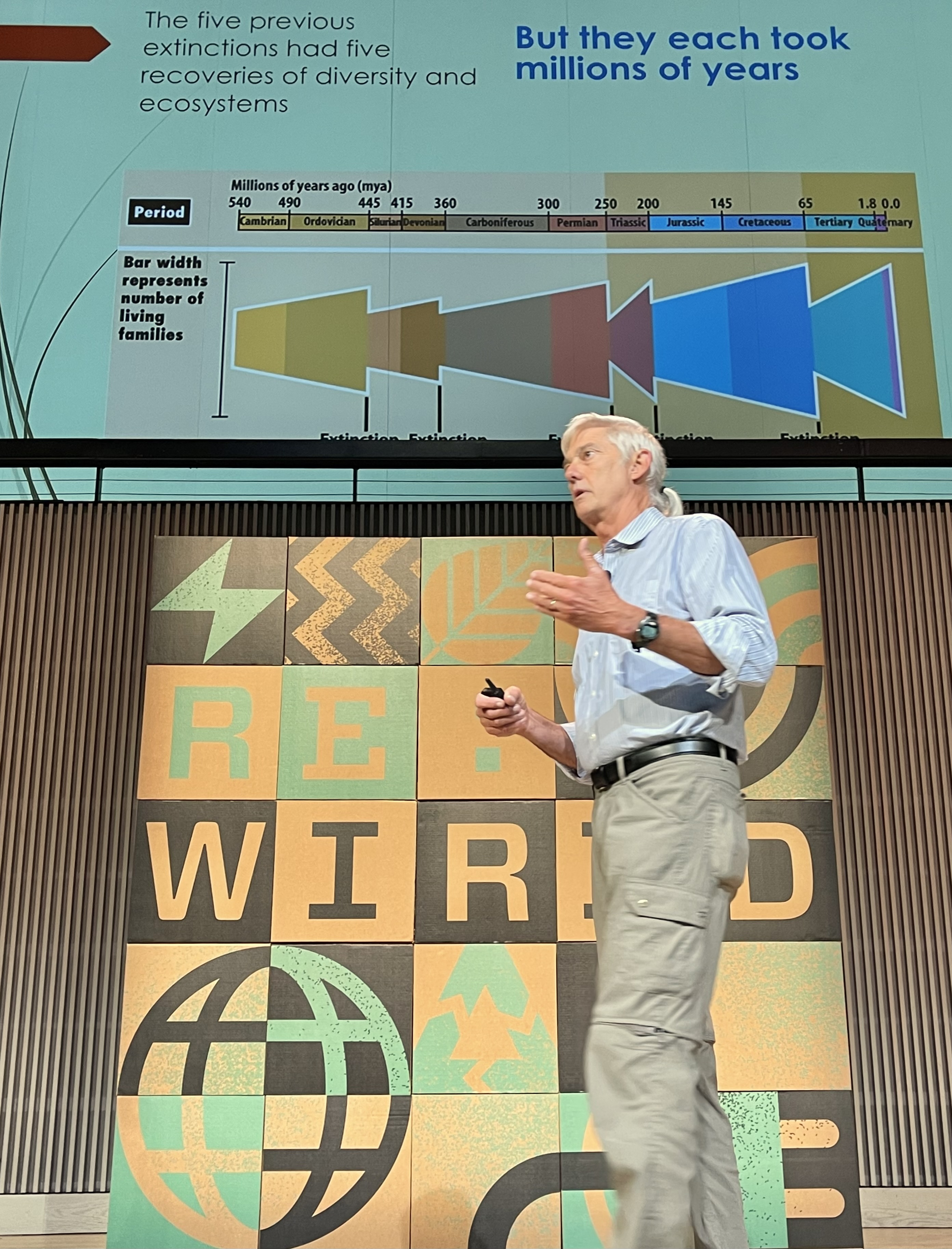
Palumbi in 2022

Stephen R. Palumbi (born October 17, 1956) is an American zoologist who is the Jane and Marshall Steel Jr. Professor in Marine Sciences at Stanford University at Hopkins Marine Station. He also holds a Senior Fellowship at the Stanford Woods Institute for the Environment.

== Early life ==
Palumbi was born in Baltimore, Maryland. He received his B.A. in biology from the Johns Hopkins University in 1978 and his Ph.D. in zoology from the University of Washington in marine ecology in 1984. He received the Buell Award from the Ecological Society of America in 1984.

== Career ==
From 1985 to 1996, he worked in the Department of Zoology at the University of Hawaii, winning the Matsuda Fellowship Award for Faculty Research in 1991 and a University of Hawaii Regents Medal for Excellence in Research in 1996. He was promoted to full professor in 1994 and appointed the director of the Kewalo Marine Laboratory in 1995. Palumbi moved to a professorship at Harvard University in 1996 and on to Stanford University in August 2002. In 2007, he was appointed the Harold A. Miller Director of the Hopkins Marine Station, and was appointed to the Jane and Marshall Steel Chair of Biology in 2009.

In 1996, Palumbi was awarded a Pew Fellowship in Marine Conservation, which he used "to develop more rapid, cost-efficient, nonradioactive genetic test procedures to identify threatened species of cetaceans found in products taken from whale meat markets ... allow[ing] the focus of management efforts to be the individual, rather than the species or stock, and enables the tracing of particular whales from fishery to market."

In 2003, he was elected a Fellow of the California Academy of Sciences and was awarded the Peter Benchley Ocean Award for Excellence in Science in 2011.

=== Research interests ===
Palumbi's research interests include studying evolution and change using molecular genetics techniques, marine population biology and conservation, and the effects of human activity on ocean systems. Some of his well known work includes research on using genomic methods to identify species resilient to climate change, and using genetic approaches to identify species of conservation concern in wildlife markets.

== Public engagement ==
In 2003, Palumbi participated in the documentary TV series The Future Is Wild, appearing in his capacity as Harvard University Professor of Marine Sciences in the initial episode, Welcome to the Future, as well as in four other episodes where he was also credited as a principal scientific advisor: Waterland, Flooded World, The Endless Desert, and The Global Ocean. The series explored possible evolutionary changes in the future over the period of five to two hundred million years, and was developed over a period of four years by a team of scientists whose work was visualised through computer animation.

=== Publications ===
Palumbi has written several books:

- The Evolution Explosion: How Humans Cause Rapid Evolutionary Change, 2002.
- The Death and Life of Monterey Bay: A Story of Revival, 2011 (with Carolyn Sotka).
- The Extreme Life of the Sea, 2014 (with Anthony R. Palumbi).

He has also been an author of more than 200 scientific papers.

== Personal life ==
Palumbi is married to a physician, Mary Roberts, and is the father to two grown children. His interests include music, and was part of the group who founded the band Sustainable Sole.

While Palumbi was at Harvard, Jonathan Wells hit a home run off of Palumbi while he was pitching in a pick-up game.
