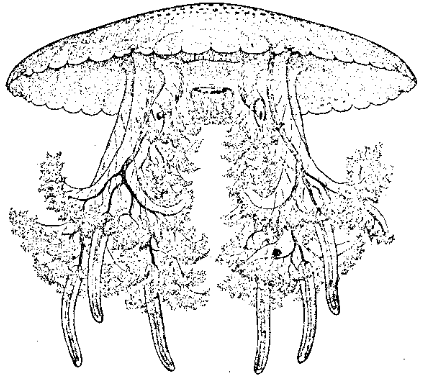

Scientific classification
- Kingdom: Animalia
- Phylum: Cnidaria
- Class: Scyphozoa
- Order: Rhizostomeae
- Family: Lychnorhizidae
- Genus: Anomalorhiza; Light, 1921
- Species: A. shawi

Binomial name
- Anomalorhiza shawi Light, 1921

= Anomalorhiza =

Species of jellyfish

Anomalorhiza is a genus of true jellyfish belonging to the family Lychnorhizidae. It is monotypic, containing the single species Anomalorhiza shawi. It has been found in the South China Sea off the coasts of Luzon and Hong Kong.
