= Donald Putnam Abbott =

American zoologist

Donald Putnam Abbott PhD

Professor emeritus of biology, at Stanford University

Personal details
- Born: October 14, 1920 Chicago, Illinois, U.S.
- Died: January 18, 1986 (aged 65) Honolulu, Hawaii, U.S.
- Education: University of Hawaii, University of California Berkeley

Donald Putnam Abbott (October 14, 1920 – January 18, 1986) was an invertebrate zoologist and professor of biology at the Hopkins Marine Station of Stanford University from 1950 through 1982. He earned his Ph.D. under S. F. Light and Ralph Smith at the University of California, Berkeley. Abbott was an expert on ascidian tunicates and an authority on all forms of invertebrate animals. He was an influential teacher, researcher, author, and student mentor. His wife, Isabella Abbott, was a world authority on marine algae of the Pacific.

== Personal life ==
Abbott was born in Chicago, Illinois, United States, on October 14, 1920. His father, a physician and professor of medicine at the University of Chicago, died in 1936 at the age of 52. Within months of his father's death, Abbott left Chicago. By 1937 he arrived in Hawaii and enrolled in the University of Hawaii at Manoa to study zoology. While there he met Isabella Aiona, a botany student. Abbott graduated in 1941 with a bachelor's degree in zoology and remained at the University of Hawaii as an instructor when his graduate studies were interrupted by the outbreak of WWII. Donald and Izzie married in 1943. That same year Donald enlisted in the US Army and was assigned to the Chemical Warfare Service.

After the war, Donald and Izzie moved to California where they both pursued graduate degrees at the University of California, Berkeley: Donald in zoology and Izzie in botany. Donald earned an M.S. degree in zoology in 1948 and a Ph.D. degree in 1950. Izzie earned her Ph.D. in botany in 1950.

During the summers of 1948 and 1949 Donald worked as a teaching assistant for the University of California for its summer courses taught at the Hopkins Marine Station of Stanford University. In 1950 he accepted an offer to join the faculty at the Hopkins Marine Station, Pacific Grove, CA, where he spent his entire professional career.

In 1953 Donald participated in a research cruise to Ifaluk Atoll, Micronesia, but was struck down by polio mellitus when he returned and nearly lost his life. As he recovered he feared that he may never walk again, though he eventually did, but with a slight limp. This brush with death gave him an intensity of focus and drive that became the hallmark of his life and work.

When Donald retired in 1982 he and Izzie returned to Hawaii where Izzie accepted a faculty position at the University of Hawaii at Manoa. Donald died in 1986 after a prolonged battle with cancer. He remained active professionally right until the end, meeting with colleagues to discuss projects and manuscripts even the day before his passing.

Abbott and Izzie have one child, a daughter, Annie Abbott Foerster.

== Professional career ==
In 1950 Stanford University hoped to recruit the prominent British zoologist Charles Maurice Yonge to join the Faculty of Hopkins Marine Station. Dr. Yonge declined but recommended Donald Abbott to the search committee. Abbott was subsequently offered an instructorship at Hopkins (he was also offered instructorship positions at Yale and Columbia University). He accepted Stanford's offer and joined the faculty at Hopkins Marine Station, where he remained his entire career (1950–1982).

Abbott was an active researcher, but his greatest legacy was as a teacher. His courses were among the most popular ever offered at Hopkins Marine Station. He influenced hundreds of students in his invertebrate zoology course (111H-112H) and the Hopkins "Spring Course." Abbott was also an effective graduate student mentor, supervising 25 students who earned Ph.D. degrees and 10 more who earned master's degrees.

In addition to his many research publications, Abbott contributed to two major books that are constantly used by invertebrate zoologists even now, decades after they were published. He was invited to contribute to the book Light's Manual: Intertidal Invertebrates of the Central California Coast and was the principal author and editor of Intertidal Invertebrates of California, which is often simply and affectionally referred to as The Big Book.

In 1975 Abbott was awarded the Stanford University H&S Dean's Award for Teaching. At the 1982 Commencement of Stanford University, Abbott was also awarded the Lloyd W. Dinkelspiel Award for Outstanding Service to Undergraduate Education.

Abbott's career and his contributions to the fields of invertebrate zoology and marine biology were commemorated in a symposium held in his honor on November 20–23, 1987 at the Asilomar Conference Center, Asilomar, California, US. It was sponsored by The Hopkins Marine Station and Stanford University. More than 150 of Abbott's colleagues, students, and friends attended these scientific meetings and many of them presented research that covered the wide span of topics that would have interested him.

== Selected works ==
- Donald P. Abbott (1953). Asexual reproduction in the colonial ascidian Metandrocarpa taylori. University of California Press.
- Marston Bates; Donald P. Abbott (1959). IFALUK-Portrait of a Coral Island. Museum Press Ltd.
- Donald P. Abbott (1968). The Biology of Acmaea. The Veliger 11 Supplement.
- Robert H. Morris, R.H.; Donald P. Abbott; Eugene C. Haderlie (1980). Intertidal Invertebrates of California. Stanford University Press.
- Donald P. Abbott (1980). Phylum Chordata: Introduction to the Urochordata, in Light's Manual – Intertidal Invertebrates of the Central California Coast 3rd Edition. University of California Press.
- Donald P. Abbott; Galen H. Hilgard (1987). Observing Marine Invertebrates: Drawings from the Laboratory. Stanford University Press.
- Donald P. Abbott; A. Todd Newberry; Kendall M. Morris (1997). Reef and Shore Fauna of Hawaii. Bishop Museum Press.
