= Pseudorhiza =

Scientific classification
- Domain: Eukaryota
- Kingdom: Animalia
- Phylum: Cnidaria
- Class: Scyphozoa
- Order: Rhizostomeae
- Family: Lychnorhizidae
- Genus: Pseudorhiza von Lendenfeld, 1882

Genus of jellyfishes

Pseudorhiza is a genus of cnidarians belonging to the family Lychnorhizidae.

The species of this genus are found in Australia.

Species:

- Pseudorhiza aurosa von Lendenfeld, 1882
- Pseudorhiza haeckeli Haacke, 1884
