= Pseudorhiza aurosa =

Scientific classification
- Domain: Eukaryota
- Kingdom: Animalia
- Phylum: Cnidaria
- Class: Scyphozoa
- Order: Rhizostomeae
- Family: Lychnorhizidae
- Genus: Pseudorhiza
- Species: P. aurosa

Binomial name
- Pseudorhiza aurosa von Lendenfeld, 1882

Species of jellyfish

Pseudorhiza aurosa is a species of true jellyfish within the family Lychnorhizidae found around Australia. The bell of the species reaches 40 centimeters wide, 13 centimeters high, and is flatly rounded.
