= Pseudorhiza haeckeli =

Scientific classification
- Domain: Eukaryota
- Kingdom: Animalia
- Phylum: Cnidaria
- Class: Scyphozoa
- Order: Rhizostomeae
- Family: Lychnorhizidae
- Genus: Pseudorhiza
- Species: P. haeckeli

Binomial name
- Pseudorhiza haeckeli Haacke, 1884

Species of cnidarian

Pseudorhiza haeckeli, or Haeckel's jelly, is a species of cnidarian of the family Lychnorhizidae. The species is a carnivore with a mild sting. It is native to temperate and sub-tropical Australian marine waters. It has been observed at depths of 1-30 metres, and is sometimes found cast on beaches. It was described by the naturalist Wilhelm Haacke in 1884, and named for his mentor Ernst Haeckel.

== Description ==
The animal has a bell which is round with raised, warty lumps on the upper surface. It has a cross-shaped structure inside the bell. Its arms curve around the bottom of the bell and a long, colourful tail trails below it. It possesses no tentacles. Its bell and arms are reasonably transparent. Tail length varies depending on the individual, as it may be in a stage of regeneration. Its bell can reach a diameter of 40 cm.

== Biology ==
The tail of Haeckel's Jellyfish can be damaged while capturing prey and may be attacked by other animals. The warty lumps on the bell and the curved arms contain stinging cells, to which humans are only mildly sensitive. This jelly is often seen in association with amphipods, parasitic anemones or schools of small fishes which shelter around its arms and bell. All members of its class, Scyphozoa, are gonochoric. The egg is laid by an adult medusa. It then develops into a free-living planula, then to a scyphistoma to a strobila, and finally into a free-living young medusa.
