= Mildred Stratton Wilson =

American zoologist

Mildred S. Wilson
- Born: Mildred Stratton; 25 April 1909; Seaside, Oregon, US
- Died: 6 August 1973 (aged 64)
- Education: University of California at Berkeley
- Known for: Invertebrate Zoology
- Spouse: Charles Sawyer Wilson
- Children: 1
- Awards: Guggenheim Fellowship
- Scientific career
- Fields: Zoology, Copepoda
- Workplaces: United States National Museum, University of Alaska
- Academic advisors: S. F. Light

Mildred Stratton Wilson (April 25, 1909 – August 6, 1973) was an American zoologist, whose work on copepods was awarded a Guggenheim Fellowship in 1955.

== Early life and education ==
Mildred Evelyn Stratton was born in Seaside, Oregon, the daughter of Clark Stratton and Ella Bock Stratton. Her father ran a confectionery shop and pool room; her mother was a Danish immigrant. She was raised there and in Everett, Washington. Stratton graduated from Marysville High School in 1925 at 16 years old. She earned a two-year teaching certificate in 1927 at Western Washington Teachers College in Bellingham, Washington, and taught in Marysville from 1927 to 1934; meanwhile she attended summer plant biology courses at Puget Sound Biological Station (PSBS). During her teaching in the 1932–1933 school year, the Depression caused teachers to be paid in "warrants" which were not worth much. So after getting married, and after the 1933–1934 school year, she stopped teaching. In 1936, she enrolled at the University of California at Berkeley. In 1937 she was nominated for the Phi Beta Kappa society. She earned a B. A. there in 1938. She was a research assistant for S. F. Light in the spring of 1938. She was a research assistant at Berkeley until 1940.

== Career ==
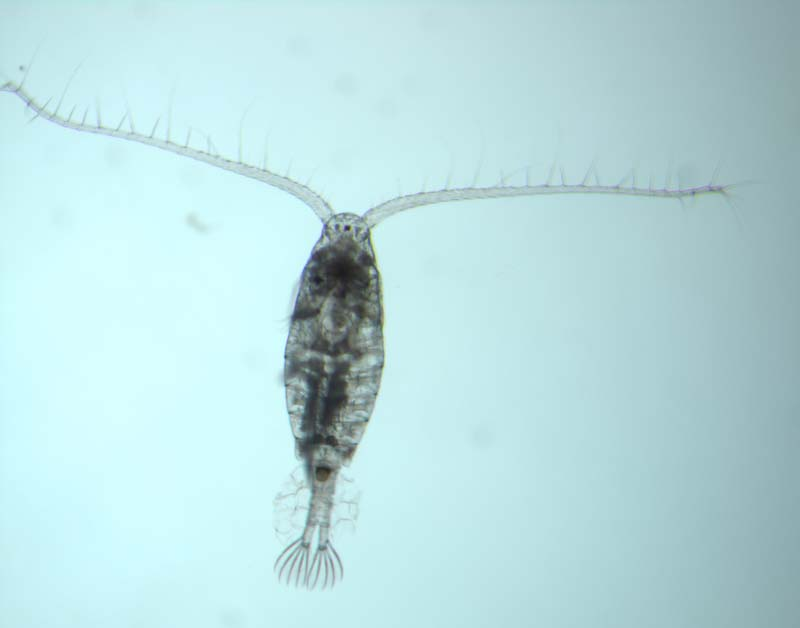
Unidentified species of Diaptomus from the Great Lakes

Mildred Stratton Wilson established a solid record of scientific research without an advanced degree and without any official university affiliation. In 1938 Mildred Stratton Wilson started research, mostly as a volunteer, in the copepod collection at the National Museum of Natural History in Washington, D.C., with her research continuing the work of Light on copepods. She was appointed assistant curator of marine invertebrate zoology in 1944 during World War II. She kept this title until 1946. In 1946 she was named a Collaborator in Copepod Crustaceans of the Smithsonian Institution. In 1948, she remained a collaborator at NMNH, but her work took her to Alaska, where she was the Territorial Entomologist with the United States Army Corps of Engineers. She became consulting biologist for the Arctic Health Research Center in 1951. She was affiliated with them until 1967, when they moved the center to Fairbanks, Alaska. While she was there she did not receive a salary but did get a new microscope, postal privileges, and support to make collections in Alaska. In 1955, Wilson was the first Alaskan resident to be awarded a Guggenheim Fellowship. She published her research regularly in scientific journals, including Freshwater Biology, Canadian Journal of Zoology, and Crustaceana. In the 1960s she was appointed of "Research Associate, Division of Crustacea, USNM", a title that she had for the rest of her life.

She was also the first Alaskan to receive funding from the National Science Foundation, which she held from 1957 to 1967 for her work on freshwater copepods. Wilson became an Associate in Marine Science of the University of Alaska's Institute of Marine Science in 1968, to keep her NSF funding. Wilson wanted to create a monograph of the genus Diaptomus in North America, but was unable to complete it before her death.

== Personal life ==
Wilson was the second oldest child of Clark Stratton (c. 1859–1928) and Ella Bock Stratton (c. 1884–1954, with five sisters and one brother. She lived in Seaside, Oregon until the family business was burnt down, and the family moved to a farm around Everett, Washington.

The first day that Wilson was to begin student teaching her brother died of diabetes. In the fall of 1927 she started fully teaching at Marysville Grade School and became the head of the Stratton family. The family physician Dr. J. W. Rose gave her moral and financial support and helped to fund her classes at PSBS.

Mildred Stratton married Charles Sawyer Wilson (not to be confused with Charles Branch Wilson, who was also a copepodologist but no relation), whom she met at Puget Sound Biological Station, on June 25, 1934, in San Anselmo, California. Their daughter Linda was born in 1939, and died in a car accident in 1972, a few months before Mildred died. Mildred had three grandsons.

Mildred Stratton Wilson died in 1973, aged 64 years. She had had a number of illnesses over her last twenty years, including cancer and arthritis. In around 1971 she needed spinal surgery and a second one in the spring of 1973, and she died on the 6 August 1973. Her papers are archived at the University of Alaska at Anchorage.

== Publications ==
- Wilson, M. S. 1941. New species and distribution records of diaptomid copepods from the Marsh collection in the United States National Museum.- Journal of the Washington Academy of Sciences 31: 509–515.
- -----. 1946. The species of Platycopia Sars (Copepoda, Calanoida).-Smithsonian Miscellaneous Collections 106: 1–16.
- -----. 1949. A new species of copepod of the genus Corycaeus from the North American coast.-Proceedings of the United States National Museum 99: 321–326.
- -----. 1950. A new genus proposed for Lichomolgus major Williams (Copepoda, Cyclopoida). -Journal of the Washington Academy of Sciences 40: 298- 299.
- Humes, A. G., and M. S. Wilson. 1951. The last copepodid instar of Diaptomus sanguineus Forbes (Copepoda). -Journal of the Washington Academy of Sciences 41: 395–399.
- Wilson, M. S. 1951. A new subgenus of Diaptomus (Copepoda: Calanoida), including an Asiatic species and a new species from Alaska.-Journal of the Washington Academy of Sciences 41: 168–179.
- -----, and S. F. Light. 1951. Description of a new species of diaptomid copepod from Oregon. -Transactions of the American Microscopical Society 70: 25–30.
- Wilson, M. S. 1952. An emended diagnosis of the copepod genus Pupulina (Caligoida), with descriptions of new species and a redescription of the genotype.-Proceedings of the United States National Museum 102: 245–263.
- -----. 1953. Some significant points in the distribution of Alaskan fresh-water copepod Crustacea. - Alaska Division, American Association for the Advancement of Science, Proceedings of the Second Alaskan Science Conference 1951: 315–318.
- -----. 1953. New Alaskan records of Eurytemora (Crustacea, Copepoda).-Pacific Science 7: 504–512.
- -----. 1953. New and inadequately known North American species of the copepod genus Diaptomus. -Smithsonian Miscellaneous Collections 122: 1-30.
- -----. and W. G. Moore. 1953. New records of Diaptomus sanguineus and allied species from Louisiana, with the description of a new species (Crustacea: Copepoda).-Journal of the Washington Academy of Sciences 43: 121–127.
- ------, and -----. 1953. Diagnosis of a new species of diaptomid copepod from Louisiana.-Transactions of the American Microscopical Society 72: 292- 295.
- Wilson, M. S. 1954. A new species of Diaptomus from Louisiana and Texas with notes on the subgenus Leptodiaptomus (Copepoda, Calanoida).-- Tulane Studies in Zoology 2: 51–60.
- -----. 1955. A new Louisiana copepod related to Diaptomus (Aglaodiaptomus) clavipes Schacht (Copepoda, Calanoida).-Tulane Studies in Zoology 3: 37–47.
- -----, and P. L. Illg. 1955. The family Clausiidae (Copepoda, Cyclopoida).-Proceedings of the Bio- logical Society of Washington 68: 129–141.
- Wilson, M. S. 1956. Problems encountered in zoo- geographic study of fresh-water copepods.-Alaska Division, American Association for the Advancement of Science, Proceedings of the Fourth Alaskan Science Conference 1953: 167–171.
- -----. 1956. North American harpacticoid cope- pods. 1. Comments on the known fresh-water species of the Canthocamptidae. [and] 2. Canthocamptus oregonensis n. sp. from Oregon and California.- Transactions of the American Microscopical Society 75: 290–307.
- -----. 1956. North American harpacticoid cope- pods. 3. Paracamptus reductus, n. sp., from Alaska.-Journal of the Washington Academy of Sci- ences 46: 348–351.
- -----. 1957. Redescription of Teredicola typica C. B. Wilson (Crustacea: Copepoda).-Pacific Science 11:265-274.
- -----. 1958. New records and species of calanoid copepods from Saskatchewan and Louisiana.-Canadian Journal of Zoology 36: 489–497.
- -----. 1958. A review of the copepod genus Ridgewayia (Calanoida) with descriptions of new species from the Dry Tortugas, Florida.-Proceedings of the United States National Museum 108: 137–179.
- -----. 1958. North American harpacticoid copepods. 4. Diagnoses of new species of fresh-water Canthocamptidae and Cletodidae (genus Huntemannia).-Proceedings of the Biological Society of Washington 71: 43–48.
- 1958. North American harpacticoid copepods. 5. The status of Attheyella americana (Herrick) and the correct name for the subgenus Brehmiella. - Proceedings of the Biological Society of Washington 71: 49–52.
- -----.1958. North American harpacticoid copepods. 6. New records and species of Bryocamptus (subgenus Arcticocamptus) from Alaska. -Transactions of the American Microscopical Society 77: 320- 328.
- -----.1958. The copepod genus Halicyclops in North America, with description of a new species from Lake Pontchartrain, Louisiana, and the Texas coast.-Tulane Studies in Zoology 6: 176–189.
- -----, and H. C. Yeatman. 1959. Free-living Copepoda [Introduction].--In: W. T. Edmondson, ed., Fresh-water biology. Second edition. pp. 735–738. John Wiley & Sons, New York.
- Wilson, M. S. 1959. Calanoida.-In: W. T. Edmondson, ed., Fresh-water biology. Second edition. pp. 738–794. John Wiley & Sons, New York.
- -----.1959. Branchiura and parasitic Copepoda.- In: W. T. Edmondson, ed., Fresh-water biology. Sec- ond edition. pp. 862–868. John Wiley & Sons, New York.
- -----, and H. C. Yeatman. 1959. Harpacticoida.- In: W. T. Edmondson, ed., Fresh-water biology. Second edition. pp. 815–861. John Wiley & Sons, New York.
- Northcote, T. G., M. S. Wilson, and D. R. Hum. 1964. Some characteristics of Nitinat Lake, an inlet on Vancouver Island, British Columbia.-Journal of the Fisheries Research Board of Canada 21:1069-1081.
- Wilson, M. S. 1965. North American harpacticoid copepods. 7. A new species of Stenhelia from Nuwuk Lake on the Arctic coast of Alaska. -Proceedings of the Biological Society of Washington 78: 179–187.
- -----.1966. The nominate subgenus in the genus Acartia (Copepoda, Calanoida).-Crustaceana 11: 109.
- -----. 1966. North American harpacticoid copepods. 8. The Danielssenia sibirica group, with description of D. stefanssoni Willey from Alaska.- Pacific Science 20: 435–444.
- -----, and J. C. Tash. 1966. The euryhaline copepod genus Eurytemora in fresh and brackish waters of the Cape Thompson region, Chukchi Sea, Alaska.-Proceedings of the United States National Museum 118: 553–576.
- Wilson, M. S. 1971. North American harpacticoid copepods. 9. A new Mesochra (Canthocamptidae) from the Gulf of Mexico with notes on a related Mediterranean form.--Proceedings of the Biological Society of Washington 83: 483–491.
- -----. 1972. Copepods of marine affinities from mountain lakes of western North America.-Limnology and Oceanography 17: 762–763.
- -----. 1973. North American harpacticoid copepods. 10. Pseudobradya major (Olofsson, 1917) n. comb. from Nuwuk Lake, Alaska, with a checklist of copepod associates.-Transactions of the American Microscopical Society 92: 657–662.
- -----. 1974. Two new species of the cyclopoid copepod genus Pterinopsyllus from the Gulf of Mexico. --Bulletin of Marine Science 23: 510-520
- -----. 1975. North American harpacticoid copepods. 11. New records and species of Elaphoidella (Canthocamptidae) from the United States and Canada. --Crustaceana 28: 125–138.
