= Isabella Abbott =

Hawaiian ethnobotanist

Dr. Isabella Aiona Abbott
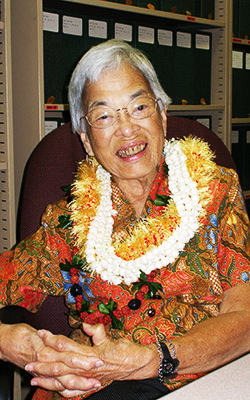

Professor of Biological Sciences, Emerita, at Stanford University

Personal details
- Born: Isabella Kauakea Yau Yung Aiona; 20 June 1919 Hana, Maui, Territory of Hawaii
- Died: 28 October 2010 (aged 91) Oahu, Hawaii, US
- Spouse: Donald Putnam Abbott
- Children: Annie Abbott Foerster, daughter
- Education: Kamehameha Schools; University of Hawaiʻi at Mānoa; University of Michigan; University of California, Berkeley

Isabella Aiona Abbott (June 20, 1919 – October 28, 2010) was an educator, phycologist, and ethnobotanist from Hawaii. The first native Hawaiian woman to receive a PhD in science, she became a leading expert on Pacific marine algae.

== Early life ==
Abbott was born Isabella Kauakea Yau Yung Aiona in Hana, Maui, Territory of Hawaii, on June 20, 1919. Her Hawaiian name means "white rain of Hana" and she was known as "Izzy". Her father was ethnically Chinese while her mother was a Native Hawaiian. Her mother taught her about edible Hawaiian seaweeds and the value and diversity of Hawaii's native plants. Abbott was the only girl and second youngest in a family of eight siblings.

She grew up in Honolulu near Waikiki, and graduated from Kamehameha Schools in 1937. She received her undergraduate degree in botany at the University of Hawaiʻi at Mānoa in 1941, a master's degree in botany from the University of Michigan in 1942, and a Doctor of Philosophy in botany from the University of California, Berkeley in 1950. She married zoologist Donald Putnam Abbott (1920–1986), who had been a fellow student at the University of Hawaiʻi as well as Berkeley. The couple moved to Pacific Grove, California where her husband taught at the Hopkins Marine Station run by Stanford University. Since at that time women were rarely considered for academic posts, she spent time raising her daughter Annie Abbott Foerster, while studying the algae of the California coast. She adapted recipes to use the local bull kelp (Nereocystis) in foods such as cakes and pickles.

== Career ==
In 1956 she became a research associate and taught as a lecturer at Hopkins. She compiled a book on marine algae of the Monterey peninsula, which later was expanded to include all of the California coast. She was awarded the Darbaker Prize by the Botanical Society of America in 1969. By 1972, Stanford University promoted her directly to full professor of biology, where she was the first woman and first person of color in this position.

In 1982 both Abbotts retired and moved back to Hawaii, where she was hired by the University of Hawaii to teach ethnobotany, the interaction of humans and plants.

She authored eight books and over 150 publications. She was considered the world's leading expert on Hawaiian seaweeds, known in the Hawaiian language as limu. She was credited with discovering over 200 species, with several named after her, including the Rhodomelaceae family (red algae) genus of Abbottella. This earned her the nickname "First Lady of Limu."

In 1993 she received the Charles Reed Bishop Medal and in 1997 she received the Gilbert Morgan Smith Medal from the National Academy of Sciences.

She was the G. P. Wilder Professor of Botany from 1980 until her retirement in 1982, when she and her husband moved to Hawaii where she continued her research as the professor emerita of botany at the University of Hawaii. She served on the board of directors of the Bernice P. Bishop Museum. In November 1997 she co-authored an essay in the Honolulu Star-Bulletin criticizing the trustees of Kamehameha Schools, which led to its reorganization. In 1988 she was elected a fellow of the American Association for the Advancement of Science.

In 2005, she was named a Living Treasure of Hawaiʻi by the Honpa Hongwanji Mission of Hawaii.

She was considered the foremost authority on the algae of the Pacific Ocean basin and in 2008 she received a lifetime achievement award from the Hawaii Department of Land and Natural Resources for her studies of coral reefs.

The Board of Regents of the University of Hawaiʻi unanimously voted to rename the Life Sciences Building after Abbott in 2023.

== Death ==
Isabella Kauakea Aiona Abbott died on October 28, 2010, at the age of 91 at her home in Honolulu. Abbott's surviving family includes her daughter Annie Abbott Foerster, and a granddaughter, both residing in Hawaii.

To preserve Abbott's legacy and career as a botanist, the University of Hawaiʻi established a scholarship to support graduate research in Hawaiian ethnobotany and marine botany.

== Works ==
- Isabella A. Abbott (1947). Brackish-Water Algae from the Hawaiian Islands. Pacific Science.
- Isabella A. Abbott (1961). On Schimmelmannia from California and Japan.
- Gilbert Morgan Smith; George J. Hollenberg; Isabella A. Abbott (1969). Marine Algae of the Monterey Peninsula, California. Stanford University Press. ISBN 978-0-804740197.
- Isabella A. Abbott (1970). Yamadaella, a new genus in the Nemaliales (Rhodophyta). Phycologia
- Isabella A. Abbott; Munenao Kurogi (1972). Contributions to the systematics of Benthic Marine Algae of the North Pacific: Proceedings of a seminar on the contributions of culture, laboratory, field and life history studies to the systematics of benthic marine algae of the Pacific; Japan–U.S. cooperative science program, August 13–16, 1971. Sapporo, Japan: Japanese Society of Psychology.
- Isabella Aiona Abbott; Eleanor Horswill Williamson (1974). Limu: an ethnobotanical study of some edible Hawaiian seaweeds. Pacific Tropical Botanical Garden.
- Isabella A. Abbott; George J. Hollenberg (1976). Marine Algae of California. Stanford University Press. ISBN 978-0-8047-2152-3.
- Elmer Yale Dawson; Isabella Aiona Abbott (1978). How to know the seaweeds. W. C. Brown Company. ISBN 978-0-697-04892-9.
- Isabella A. Abbott; Michael S. Foster; Louise F. Eklund. "Pacific seaweed aquaculture". Proceedings of a symposium on useful algae, March 6–8, 1980; Pacific Grove, California. California Sea Grant College Program, Institute of Marine Resources, University of California.
- Isabella Aiona Abbott (1990). A taxonomic and nomenclatural assessment of the species of Liagora (Rhodophyta, Nemaliales) in the herbarium of Lamouroux.
- Isabella Aiona Abbott (March 1992). Lā'au Hawaiʻi: traditional Hawaiian uses of plants. Bernice Pauahi Bishop Museum Press. ISBN 978-0-930897-62-8.
- Isabella A. Abbott (1995). Taxonomy of Economic Seaweeds With reference to some Pacific species. California Sea Grant College Program. Eight volume series from an international workshop hosted by the University of Hawaiʻi, Honolulu, July 1993
- Isabella A. Abbott (April 1996). New Species and Notes on Marine Algae from Hawaiʻi. Pacific Science. University of Hawaiʻi Press.
- Isabella A. Abbott (July 1996). Ethnobotany of seaweeds: clues to uses of seaweeds. Hydrobiologia. Kluwer Academic Publishers.
- Alan J.K. Millar; Isabella A. Abbott (1997). The new genus and species Ossiella pacifica (Griffithsieae, Rhodophyta) from Hawaii and Norfolk Island, Pacific Ocean. Journal of Phycology.
- G.T. Kraft; Isabella A. Abbott (1997). Platoma ardreanum (Schizymeniaeae, Gigartinales) and Halymenia chiangiana (Halymeniaceae, Halymeniales), two new species of proliferous, foliose red algae from the Hawaiian Islands. Cryptogamie, Algologie.
- Isabella Aiona Abbott (1998). Some new species and new combinations of marine red algae from the central Pacific. Phycological Research.
- Isabella Aiona Abbott (1999). Marine red algae of the Hawaiian Islands. Bernice Pauahi Bishop Museum Press. ISBN 978-1-58178-003-1.
- Isabella Aiona Abbott; John Marinus Huisman (April 2004). Marine green and brown algae of the Hawaiian Islands. Bernice Pauahi Bishop Museum Press. ISBN 978-1-58178-030-7.
- Isabella A. Abbott; John Marinus Huisman (June 2005). Studies in the Liagoraceae (Nemaliales, Rhodophyta) I. The genus Trichogloea. Phycological Research.
- M.S. Kim; I.A. Abbott (March 2006). Taxonomic notes on Hawaiian Polysiphonia, with transfer to Neosiphonia (Rhodomelaceae, Rhodophyta). Phycological Research.
- Isabella A. Abbott; David L. Ballantine (April 2006). Ganonema vermiculare sp nov (Liagoraceae, Rhodophyta), a new species from Puerto Rico, Caribbean Sea. Botanica Marina.
- C.F. Gurgel; R. Terada; I.A. Abbott; et al. (April 2006). Towards a global phylogeography of Gracilaria salicornia (gracilariaceae, rhodophyta), an invasive species in Hawaii, based on chloroplast and mitochondrial markers. Journal of Phycology.
- Isabella Aiona Abbott; Roger R. B. Leakey (June 2006). Craig R. Elevitch (ed.). Traditional trees of Pacific Islands: their culture, environment, and use. Permanent Agriculture Resources. ISBN 978-0-9702544-5-0.
- Isabella Aiona Abbott; John Marinus Huisman; Celia M. Smith (2007). Hawaiian Reef Plants. Honolulu, Hawaii: University of Hawaiʻi Sea Grant College Program.
- Roy T. Tsuda; Isabella A. Abbott; Peter S. Vroom; et al. (April 2008). Additional marine benthic algae from Howland and Baker Islands, central Pacific. Pacific Science.
- Roy T. Tsuda; Isabella A. Abbott; Peter S. Vroom; et al. (October 2010). Marine Benthic Algae of Johnston Atoll: New Species Records, Spatial Distribution, and Taxonomic Affinities with Neighboring Islands. Pacific Science.
- Isabella A. Abbott; David L. Ballantine; Daniel C. O'Doherty (July 2010). Morphological relationships within the genus Lophocladia (Rhodomelaceae, Rhodophyta) including a description of L. kuesteri sp nov from Hawaiʻi. Phycologia.
- Isabella A. Abbott; David L. Ballantine (July 2012). Veleroa setteana, n. sp (Rhodophyta: Rhodomelaceae), from the Hawaiian Archipelago, including Notes on the Generitype. Pacific Science.

== See also ==
- Hawaiian ethnobiology
- Timeline of women in science
