= Lychnorhiza arubae =

Scientific classification
- Kingdom: Animalia
- Phylum: Cnidaria
- Class: Scyphozoa
- Order: Rhizostomeae
- Family: Lychnorhizidae
- Genus: Lychnorhiza
- Species: L. arubae

Binomial name
- Lychnorhiza arubae Stiasny, 1920

Species of jellyfish

Lychnorhiza arubae is a species of true jellyfish within the genus Lychnorhiza. It has been found in waters surrounding the Malay Archipelago.

== Description ==
Lychnorhiza arubae is around 23 centimetres in width. Eight pointed, velar lappets are present in each octant. The arm-disk has short filaments. The oral arms are as long as the radius of the bell disk, and are widely separated from each other. They have a few short filaments. There are two centripetal canals in between adjacent radial canals; rhopalar radial canals are broad, while inter-rhopalar ones are more narrow.
