= Fiorenza Micheli =

Italian-American marine ecologist and conservation biologist

- Born: Italy

Academic background
- Education: University of Florence; PhD, Marine Sciences, 1995, University of North Carolina at Chapel Hill
- Thesis: Individual-based approach to the study of predator-prey interactions in marine soft bottoms: role of foraging behavior of predators in determining patterns of predation on benthic prey (1995)

Fiorenza "Fio" Micheli is an Italian-American marine ecologist and conservation biologist.

== Early life and education ==
Micheli was born and raised in Italy. Upon graduating from the University of Florence, where she studied animal behavior, she accepted a job collecting intertidal animals for a nature documentary. Following this, she enrolled at the University of North Carolina at Chapel Hill for her PhD and at the National Center for Ecological Analysis and Synthesis for her post-doctoral research. In 1996, Micheli obtained a grant from the North Carolina Division of Marine Fisheries to settle a long-standing dispute between rival oyster and clam fishers.

== Career ==
Upon completing her formal education, Micheli accepted a faculty position at the University of Pisa. She later accepted an assistant professor of Biological Sciences faculty appointment at Stanford University's Hopkins Marine Station. While serving in this new role, she continued her research into the impact of human exploitation on the world's seas. In 2002, Micheli initiated and co-organized an American Association for the Advancement of Science symposium to discuss socioeconomic and ecological strategies to manage fisheries sustainably and preserve marine resources. In 2004, Micheli was selected as a Aldo Leopold Leadership Fellow "to help them communicate scientific information effectively to non-scientific audiences, especially policy makers, the media, business leaders and the public."

As a result of her research, Micheli was awarded one of five 2009 Pew Fellowships in Marine Conservation. She planned on using the $150,000 grant for her project "assessing human threats to Mediterranean marine ecosystems and their cumulative impacts on deep and shallow Mediterranean reefs." Following this, she received further funding from the Stanford Woods Institute for the Environment to study two isolated Pacific atolls around Hawaii. In 2014, Micheli co-authored a paper challenging a previously accepted theory which stated that protecting threatened species with unique functional roles is synonymous with protecting ecosystems. She argued instead that threatened species in high numbers could damage their surroundings.

At the beginning of 2017, Micheli was the recipient of the Monterey Bay National Marine Sanctuary's Ricketts Memorial Award. In June, Micheli co-authored a paper that called on marine scientists to incorporate social responsibility into sustainable seafood metrics. She was also co-appointed to jointly lead Stanford’s Center for Ocean Solutions with conservationist Jim Leape. As a result of her research, Micheli was named the third keynote speaker at the 2019 Inter-Agency Standing Committee Conference.

During the COVID-19 pandemic, Micheli and Jeremy Goldbogen were appointed as Co-Directors of Hopkins Marine Station for a two-year term. In this role, she earned various research grant for her four co-led research projects; One Ocean: A Vision for Transformative Ocean Research, Education and Impact at Stanford University, Resilience Engineering: Interventions to Maintain Ecosystem Value During Climate Change, Taking the Pulse of Monterey Bay: Revolutionizing Oceans Research and Education, and Creating a Digital Revolution for Ocean Stewardship.
