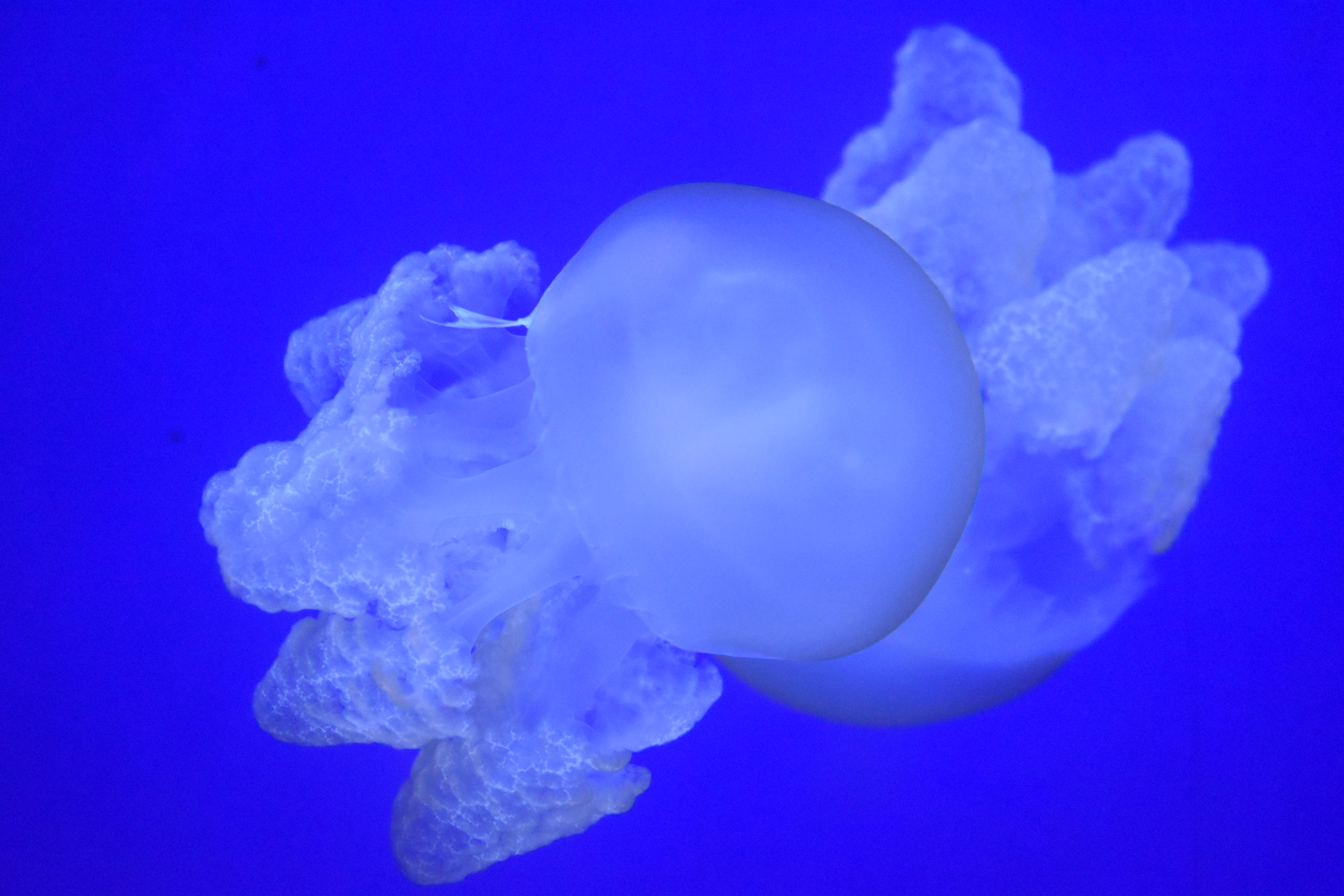

Scientific classification
- Kingdom: Animalia
- Phylum: Cnidaria
- Class: Scyphozoa
- Order: Rhizostomeae
- Family: Lychnorhizidae
- Genus: Lychnorhiza; Haeckel, 1880

= Lychnorhiza =

Genus of jellyfishes

Lychnorhiza is a genus of jellyfish in the family Lychnorhizidae.

== Species ==
The following species are recognized in the genus Lychnorhiza:

- Lychnorhiza arubae Stiasny, 1920
- Lychnorhiza lucerna Haeckel, 1880
- Lychnorhiza malayensis Stiasny, 1920
