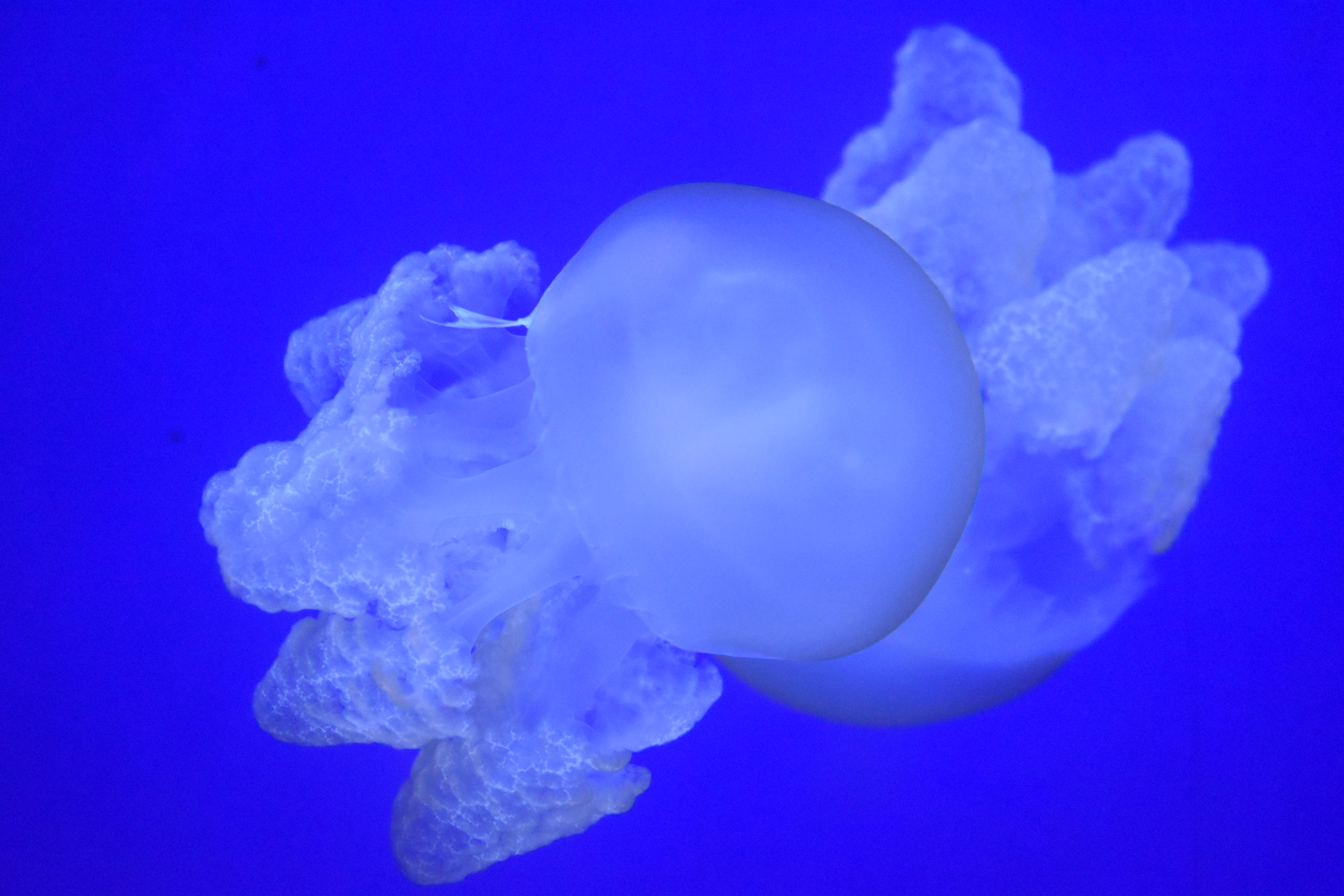

Scientific classification
- Kingdom: Animalia
- Phylum: Cnidaria
- Class: Scyphozoa
- Order: Rhizostomeae
- Suborder: Dactyliophorae
- Family: Lychnorhizidae; Haeckel, 1880

Genera
- See text

= Lychnorhizidae =

Family of jellyfishes

Lychnorhizidae is a family of true jellyfish.

== Species ==
The following species are recognized in the family Lychnorhizidae:

- Anomalorhiza

- Anomalorhiza shawi Light, 1921

- Lychnorhiza

- Lychnorhiza arubae Stiasny, 1920
- Lychnorhiza lucerna Haeckel, 1880
- Lychnorhiza malayensis Stiasny, 1920

- Pseudorhiza

- Pseudorhiza aurosa von Lendenfeld, 1882
- Pseudorhiza haeckeli Haacke, 1884

Within the Lychnorhizidae family there is the Anomalorhiza shawi species which is located in Kota Kinabalu.
