= Joel Hedgpeth =

American biologist

- Born: 29 September 1911; Oakland, California, United States
- Died: 28 July 2006 (aged 94); Hillsboro, Oregon, United States
- Education: University of California, Berkeley (PhD)
- Spouse: Florence Warrens (m. 1944)
- Children: Sarah and Warren

Joel Walker Hedgpeth (September 29, 1911 – July 28, 2006) was a marine biologist, environmentalist, and author. He was an expert on the marine arthropods known as sea spiders (Pycnogonida), and on the seashore plant and animal life of southern and northern California; he co-authored Between Pacific Tides, the definitive guide to California intertidal organisms. He was a spokesperson for care for the floral and faunal diversity of the California coastline.

== Early life ==
Hedgpeth was born on September 29, 1911, in Oakland, California. He married Florence Warrens in 1944, and the couple had two children. He obtained his PhD (on the distribution and ecology of invertebrates along the Texas and Louisiana coasts) from the University of California, Berkeley in 1952. While at Berkeley, he studied under two of the most important marine biologists of the era, S. F. Light and Ralph I. Smith.

== Career ==
Hedgpeth met and corresponded with Edward Ricketts, a charismatic researcher of West Coast marine biology and the real-life model for the character "Doc" in John Steinbeck's novel, Cannery Row. Hedgpeth himself may have been the model for the character, "Old Jay" in Steinbeck's novel, Sweet Thursday [Schram and Newman 2007]. Hedgpeth later was the editor of several editions of Ricketts' "Between Pacific Tides," a classic in marine biology, describing marine life along the coasts of California, Oregon and Washington. Hedgpeth edited more of Ricketts' writings in two volumes of "The Outer Shores."

His publications included the massive Volume 1 of the "Treatise on Marine Ecology and Paleoecology" (1957); and Introduction to Seashore Life of the San Francisco Bay Region (1962). His teaching posts included the Scripps Institution of Oceanography at University of California, San Diego. He was also director of the Pacific Marine Station, a University of the Pacific research facility at Dillon Beach, California, from 1957 to 1965. He was director of the Yaquina Biological Laboratories of the Marine Science Center, Oregon State University, Newport, Oregon, from 1965 to 1973. He retired as Professor of Oceanography in September, 1973. He and his wife moved to Santa Rosa, California during retirement. He died July 28, 2006, in Hillsboro, Oregon. His archives are housed at Scripps Institution of Oceanography in San Diego, California.

The nudibranch Polycera hedgpethi was named in his honor by Ernst Marcus, a marine biologist who taught at the University of São Paulo in Brazil.

Hedgpeth was an iconoclast and an early environmentalist. He spoke Latin, German, Welsh, and Russian. He founded the "Society for the Prevention of Progress" and was its sole member, under a pseudonym, Jerome Tichenor (Schram and Newman 2007). Under the same pseudonym, he published "Poems in Contempt of Progress" and vocally opposed a nuclear power plant once proposed at Bodega Head, California (Carlton 2006). He was influential in the developing West Coast environmental movement in the 1970s. His influence was instrumental in getting the California freshwater shrimp, Syncaris pacifica, listed as an endangered species (Schram and Newman 2007).

== Publications ==
- Hedgpeth, Joel W. (Joel Walker), 1911–2006. Introduction to seashore life of the San Francisco Bay region and the coast of northern California. Illustrated by the author and Lynn Rudy. Berkeley, University of California Press, 1962. 136 p. illus. 19 cm.
- The Outer shores / edited by Joel W. Hedgpeth. Eureka, Calif. : Mad River Press, c1978- v. : ill.; 22 cm. ISBN 0-916422-13-5
- Hedgpeth, Joel W. (Joel Walker), 1911–2006. Animal diversity: organisms [by] Joel W. Hedgpeth. [New York] McGraw-Hill [1974] 31 p. illus. 28 cm. ISBN 0-07-005345-6
- Hedgpeth, Joel W. (Joel Walker), 1911–2006. Animal structure and function [by] Joel W. Hedgpeth. [New York] McGraw-Hill [1974] 32 p. illus. 28 cm. ISBN 0-07-005343-X
- Hedgpeth, Joel W. (Joel Walker), 1911–2006. Common seashore life of southern California. Illustrated by Sam Hinton. Edited by Vinson Brown. Healdsburg, Calif., Naturegraph Co., c1961. 64 p. illus. (part col.) map. 22 cm.
- Hedgpeth, Joel W. (Joel Walker), 1911–2006. On the evolutionary significance of the Pycnogonida. Washington, Smithsonian Institution, 1947. 53 p. plate. 25 cm.
- Hedgpeth, Joel W. (Joel Walker), 1911–2006. Pycnogonida of the United States Navy Antarctic Expedition, 1947–48. Washington. (1954). p. 147-160. illus., chart. 24 cm.
- Hedgpeth, Joel W. (Joel Walker), 1911–2006. The Pycnogonida of the western North Atlantic and the Caribbean. Washington. [n.d.] p. 157-342. illus., maps (part fold.) 24 cm.
- Hedgpeth, Joel W. (Joel Walker), 1911–2006. Report of the Pycnogonida collected by the Albatross in Japanese waters in 1900 and 1906. Washington. [n.d.] p. 233-321. illus., maps (1 fold.) 24 cm.
- Hedgpeth, Joel W. (Joel Walker), 1911–2006. Twice to the mark : translations from the Greek / Joel W. Hedgpeth. Oakland, Calif. : J.W. Hedgpeth, [198-?] [11] p.; 15 cm.
- Hedgpeth, Joel W. (Joel Walker), 1911–2006. Willapa Bay : a historical perspective and a rationale for research / by Joel W. Hedgpeth and Steven Obrebski. Washington, D.C. : Coastal Ecosystems Project, Office of Biological Services, Fish and Wildlife Service, U.S. Dept. of the Interior, 1981. viii, 52 p. : ill., maps; 28 cm.
- National Research Council (U.S.). Committee on a Treatise on Marine Ecology and Paleoecology. Treatise on marine ecology and paleoecology. Joel W. Hedgpeth, editor. [New York] 1957. 2 v. illus., ports., maps (part fold.) charts, diagrs., profiles, tables. 26 cm.
- Ricketts, Edward Flanders, 1897–1948. Between Pacific tides : an account of the habits and habitats of some five hundred of the common, conspicuous seashore invertebrates of the Pacific Coast between Sitka, Alaska, and northern Mexico / Edward F. Ricketts and Jack Calvin; foreword by John Steinbeck; line drawings by Ritchie Lovejoy. 3rd ed., rev. / revisions by Joel W. Hedgpeth. Stanford, Calif. : Stanford University Press, 1962. xiii, 516 p. : ill., maps; 24 cm.
- Ricketts, Edward Flanders, 1897–1948. Between Pacific tides / Edward F. Ricketts, Jack Calvin, and Joel W. Hedgpeth. 5th ed. / revised by David W. Phillips. Stanford, Calif. : Stanford University Press, 1985. xxvi, 652 p. : ill.; 24 cm. ISBN 0-8047-1229-8, ISBN 0-8047-1244-1 (student ed.)
- Tichenor, Jerome (a pseudonym for Joel Hedgpeth), 1911–2006. Poems in contempt of progress. Edited by Joel W. Hedgpeth. Pacific Grove, Calif., Boxwood Press [1974] viii, 70 p. 22 cm.
- Google Scholar results for Joel W. Hedgpeth
