= Hopkins Marine Station =

Marine research laboratory in Pacific Grove, California

Coordinates: 36.6205°N 121.9045°W

Hopkins Marine Station is the marine laboratory of Stanford University. It is located 90 miles (145 km) south of the university's main campus, in Pacific Grove, California (United States) on the Monterey Peninsula, adjacent to the Monterey Bay Aquarium. It is home to ten research laboratories and a fluctuating population of graduate and undergraduate students. It has also been used for archaeological exploration, including of the Chinese-American fishing village that existed on the site before burning down in 1906.

== History ==
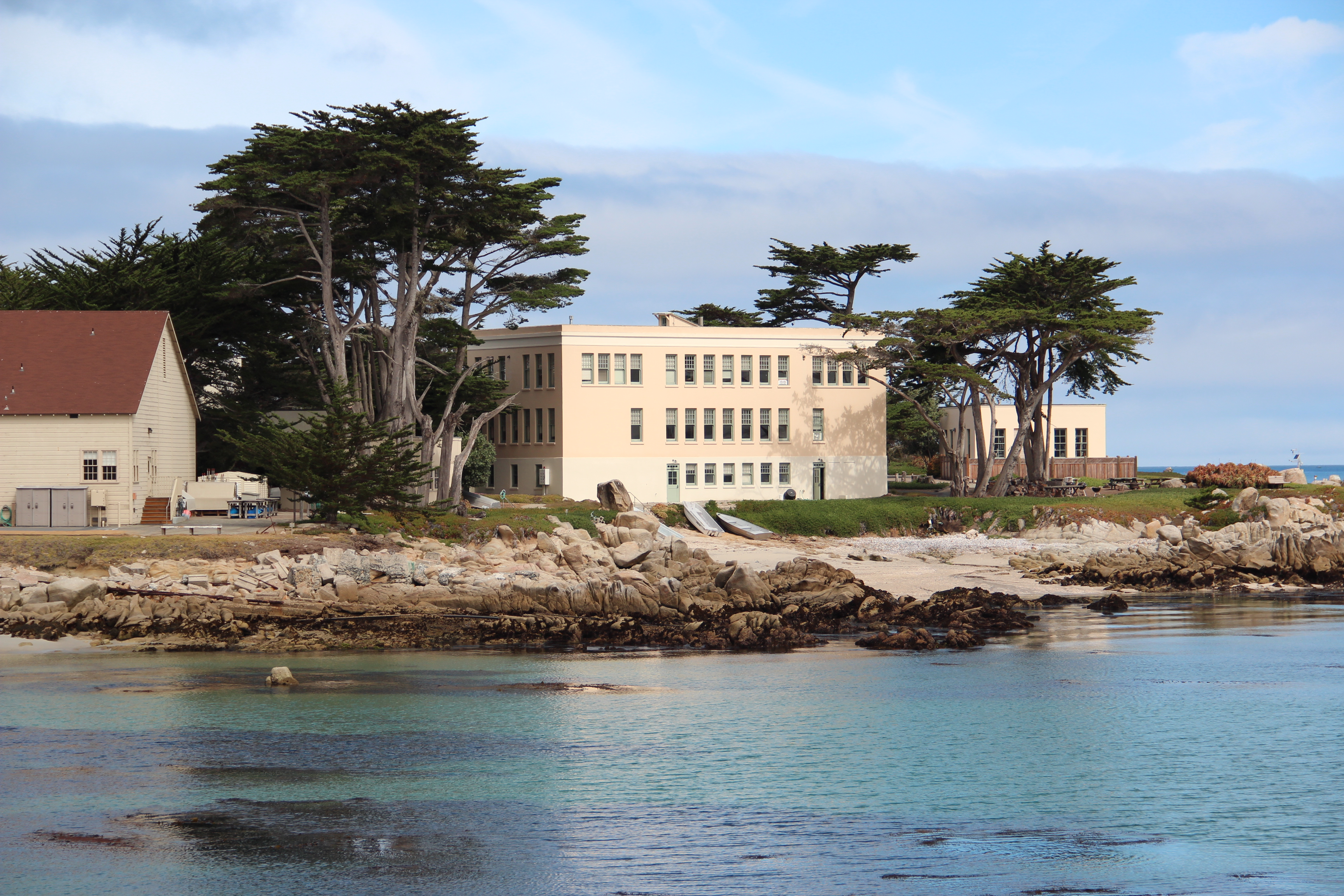
Agassiz Building viewed from Monterey Bay Aquarium. Named after Alexander Agassiz

Hopkins Marine Station was founded in 1892, making it the oldest marine laboratory on the US Pacific Coast, and the second-oldest in the US, after the Marine Biological Laboratory in Woods Hole, Massachusetts. It was originally named the Hopkins Seaside Laboratory and located on what is now called Lovers Point. In 1917, the laboratory was moved to its current location on Mussel/China/Cabrillo Point, and given its current name: Hopkins Marine Station of Stanford University. The marine station is named after Timothy Hopkins, the founder of the city of Palo Alto and an early trustee and long-time supporter of Stanford University.

== Hopkins Marine Life Refuge ==
In 1931, the State of California adopted legislation designating the intertidal and subtidal areas around Hopkins Marine Station as the Hopkins Marine Life Refuge. The collection of marine invertebrates or plants is forbidden without a scientific collecting permit. The HMLR is the second-oldest Marine Life Refuge in California, after the San Diego Marine Life Refuge of the Scripps Institute of Oceanography. More recent legislation has been enacted to prevent chemical and thermal pollution of the water, to extend the boundaries of the refuge, and to prohibit the collection of fish, as well as invertebrates and plants, without a scientific collecting permit.

== Research at Hopkins ==
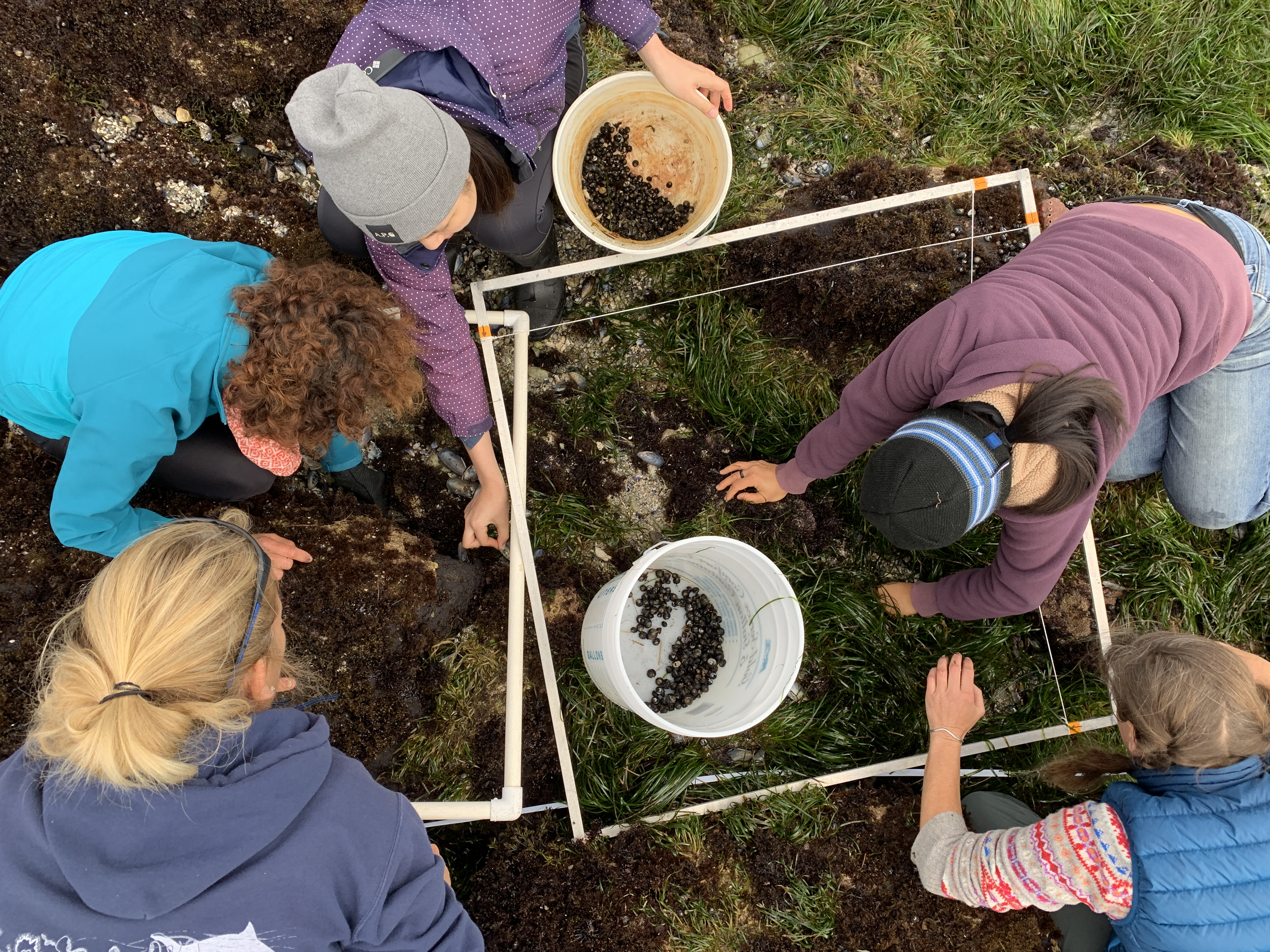
Sampling the Hewatt Transect

Scientists at the marine station pursue research in a diverse range of biological fields, including biomechanics, biochemistry, developmental biology, neurobiology, ecology, evolution, and genetics. Studies utilize a great variety of organisms, but certain particularly useful and/or charismatic ones, such as mussels, squid, tuna, tunicates, sea urchins, and mudsuckers, have been the focus of continued research efforts.

From 1963 to 1968, the station operated the research vessel R/V Te Vega, which sailed the Pacific and the Indian Ocean undertaking various studies, most notably of the Deep Scattering Layer. Data from the twenty Te Vega research voyages are still cited today, and one reference work remarks that, "[a]lthough ships from several nations participated in the Indian Ocean Expedition, only one has contributed significantly to marine phycology, namely, the Te Vega [...]."

=== Researchers ===
Some past and present researchers at Hopkins Marine Station:

- Albert W. Frenkel
- Walter Kenrick Fisher
- Cornelius Van Niel
- Donald Putnam Abbott
- Isabella Abbott
- Mary Belle Allen
- Colin Pittendrigh
- David Epel
- William Gilly
- Dennis Powers
- Mark Denny
- Stephen Palumbi
- Donald A St.Claire
- Barbara Block
- Fiorenza Micheli
- Giulio De Leo
- Chris Lowe
- Jeremy Goldbogen
- Brooke Weigel
- Nettie Stevens

== See also ==
- Hatfield Marine Science Center, a similar research facility associated with the Oregon State University and located in Newport, Oregon
- Oregon Institute of Marine Biology, a similar institution associated with the University of Oregon on the southern Oregon coast
- Moss Landing Marine Laboratories, a multi-campus marine research consortium of the California State University System
- Scripps Institution of Oceanography, a similar research facility associated with the University of California, San Diego and located in La Jolla, California
- Woods Hole Oceanographic Institution, a similar research facility located in Woods Hole, Massachusetts
