= Nightingale (disambiguation) =

The common nightingale is a songbird found in Eurasia.

Nightingale may also refer to:

== Birds ==
- Thrush nightingale, a songbird found in Eurasia
- Red-billed leiothrix, a songbird of the Indian Subcontinent

== Literature ==
- "Nightingale" (short story), a short story by Alastair Reynolds, in the 2006 collection Galactic North
- "The Nightingale" (fairy tale), an 1843 fairy tale by Hans Christian Andersen
- The Nightingale (Turnbull novel), by Agnes Sligh Turnbull
- Nightingale the Robber, a character in Russian folklore
- The Nightingale: A Conversation Poem, a 1798 poem by Samuel Taylor Coleridge
- The Nightingale, the title of the 1985 English translation of Yosele Solovey, a novel by Sholem Aleichem
- The Nightingale, a 1988 novel by Kara Dalkey
- The Nightingale (journal), the first nursing journal published in 1886; see Nursing literature
- The Nightingale (Pinkney book), a 2002 children's picture book by Jerry Pinkney
- Nightingales (book), a 2004 non-fiction book about Florence Nightingale by Gillian Gill
- The Nightingale (Hannah novel), a work of historical fiction by Kristin Hannah
- The Nightingales, a 2018 play by William Gaminara

== Music ==
=== Performers ===
- Nightingale (band), a Swedish rock band
- The Nightingales, a British post-punk band
- The Dixie Nightingales or The Nightingales, a 1958–1972 African-American male vocal group
- Jacks (band), originally Nightingale, a 1960s Japanese psychedelic rock group
- Nightingales, a Norwegian vocal quartet including Christine Guldbrandsen

=== Albums ===
- Nightingale (Erland and the Carnival album), 2011
- Nightingale (George Adams album), 1989
- Nightingale (Yoshikazu Mera album), 1998
- Nightingale, by Gilberto Gil, 1979

=== Songs ===
- "The Nightingale" (Alyabyev), an 1825 song composed by Alexander Alyabyev
- "Nightingale" (Carole King song), 1974
- "Nightingale" (Demi Lovato song), 2013
- "Nightingale", by Band-Maid from Unseen World
- "Nightingale", by the Eagles from Eagles
- "Nightingale", by Haken from Fauna
- "Nightingale", by Lisa Ekdahl from Sings Salvadore Poe
- "Nightingale", by MacKenzie Porter from Nobody's Born with a Broken Heart
- "Nightingale", by Norah Jones from Come Away with Me
- "Nightingale", by Oscar Peterson from Tristeza on Piano
- "Nightingale", by Roxy Music from Siren
- "Nightingale", by Saves the Day from Stay What You Are
- "Nightingale", by Yanni from Tribute
- "The Nightingale", by Angelo Badalamenti from Soundtrack from Twin Peaks
- "Nightingales", by Prefab Sprout from From Langley Park to Memphis
- "Nightingales" (song), a 1944 song by Vasily Solovyov-Sedoi

=== Other compositions ===
- "The Nightingale", Op.60 No.4 setting of a poem by Pushkin by Tchaikovsky
- Nightingale (ballet), a 1940 Russian ballet composed by M. Kroshner and choreographed by Aleksey Yermolayev
- Nightingale (children's opera), a 1982 children's opera by Charles Strouse
- The Nightingale (opera), a 1914 opera by Igor Stravinsky
  - Song of the Nightingale, a 1917 symphonic poem adapted by Igor Stravinsky from the opera
- The Nightingale, a composition by James B. Adams

== People ==
- Nightingale (surname), including a list of people with the name
- Nightingale baronets, a title in the Baronetage of England
- K. S. Chithra (born 1963), Indian playback singer and carnatic musician known as "Nightingale of South India"
- Jenny Lind (1820–1887), Swedish opera singer known as "Swedish Nightingale"
- Sarojini Naidu (1879–1949), Indian independence activist and poet known as "Nightingale of India"

== Places ==
=== Populated places ===
- Nightingale, Alberta, Canada, a hamlet

=== Facilities and structures ===
- Nightingale Academy, now AIM North London Academy, a secondary school in Edmonton, London, England
- Nightingale College, Salt Lake City, Utah
- Nightingale Estate, a social housing estate in Hackney, London, England
- Nightingale Hospitals, seven temporary COVID-19 hospitals in England
- Nightingale House, a historic Victorian-era home in San Francisco, California, U.S.
- Nightingale Primary School, a school in Wood Green, London, England
- Nightingale–Olympic, a shopping mall in Bangkok, Thailand

=== Natural formations ===
- Nightingale Corona, a large corona on Venus
- Nightingale Islands, a group of three islands in the South Atlantic Ocean
  - Nightingale Island, an island in the group
- Nightingale Mountains, a range in Nevada, U.S.
- Nightingale Valley, a geological site near Portishead, North Somerset, England, UK

== Television and film ==
=== Television ===
- Miss Nightingale (1974), British TV biopic starring Janet Suzman
- Nightingales (British TV series), a 1990–1993 sitcom
- Nightingales (American TV series), a 1989 medical drama
- "Nightingale" (Star Trek: Voyager), an episode of Star Trek: Voyager

=== Film ===
- The Nightingale (1914 film), a silent film starring Ethel Barrymore in her screen debut
- The Nightingale (1936 film), a Soviet drama
- The Nightingale (1981 film), a British film
- The Nightingale (2013 film), a Chinese-French film
- Nightingale (film), a 2014 American film
- The Nightingale (2018 film), an Australian film
- The Nightingale (2027 film), an American historical drama

== Vehicles ==
=== Aircraft ===
- C-9A Nightingale or McDonnell Douglas C-9, a US Air Force aircraft
- C-70 Nightingale, a variant of the Howard DGA-15 flown by the U.S. Army Air Forces

=== Ships ===
- HMS Nightingale (1805), a Seagull class brig-sloop of the British Royal Navy
- SS Nightingale, a number of ships with this name
- USS Nightingale, a number of ships with this name

== Other uses ==
- Czech Nightingale, Czech music award
- Nightingale (software), a media player for Linux, Windows, and Mac
- Nightingale (video game), a 2024 survival game
- Nachtigall Battalion (Nightingale Battalion), a Ukrainian battle command under German command in World War II
- Nightingale Informatix Corporation, a company headquartered in Markham, Ontario, Canada
- Project Nightingale, a Google Cloud and Ascension health data storage and processing project

== See also ==
- Operation Nightingale (disambiguation)
- Nightingale Hospital (disambiguation)
- Florence Nightingale (disambiguation)
- Nightingale ward, a type of hospital ward
- Philomel (disambiguation), a figure in western literature identified with the nightingale
