= USCG 65' Small harbor tug =

Class of United States Coast Guard cutters

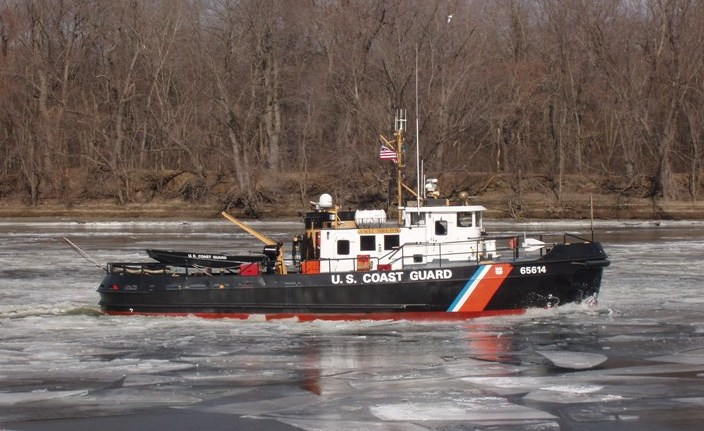
- USCGC Bollard breaking light ice.

Class overview
- Builders: Gibbs Gas Engine, 1961–1962; Barbour Boat Works, 1962–1963; Western Boat Builders, 1966–1967
- Operators: United States Coast Guard
- Preceded by: 64 foot harbor tug
- Built: 1961–1967
- In commission: 1961–
- Completed: 15
- Active: 11
- Retired: 4

General characteristics (1961)
- Type: Small harbor tug (WYTL)
- Displacement: 74 tons
- Length: 64 ft 11 in (19.79 m)
- Beam: 19 ft 1 in (5.82 m) max
- Draft: 9 ft (2.7 m) max
- Propulsion: (1) 400 hp diesel, single screw
- Speed: 10.6 knots max (1964)
- Range: 1,130 miles at maximum sustained speed of 10.6 knots; 3,690 miles at 7.0 knots economic speed (1964)
- Complement: 5 men
- Sensors & processing systems: SPN-11 (1964)
- Armament: none

The USCG 65' small harbor tug is a class of fifteen tugs used by the United States Coast Guard for search and rescue, law enforcement, aids-to-navigation work and light icebreaking. The tugs are capable of breaking 18 in (0.46 m) of ice with propulsion ahead and 21 in (0.53 m) of ice backing and ramming. They were designed with steel hulls to replace the 64 ft (20 m) wooden-hulled tugs that had been in service since the 1940s and were built by Gibbs Gas Engine Company, Jacksonville, Florida; Barbour Boat Works of New Bern, North Carolina; and Western Boat Builders Corporation, Tacoma, Washington from 1961 to 1967. They were originally powered by a single 400 horsepower diesel engine, however several have been re-powered with 500 horsepower main drive engines since they were constructed.

== Ships ==
| Name and hull number | Builder | Commissioned | Disposition or homeport |
|---|---|---|---|
| USCGC Capstan (WYTL-65601) | Gibbs | 19 July 1961 | Philadelphia, Pennsylvania |
| USCGC Chock (WYTL-65602) | Gibbs | 12 September 1962 | Baltimore, Maryland |
| USCGC Swivel (WYTL-65603) | Gibbs | 27 October 1961 | Decommissioned on 14 April 1995 (Note: Currently is M/V Swivel owned and operated by Governors Island Preservation and Education Corporation (GIPEC), Governors Island, New York) |
| USCGC Tackle (WYTL-65604) | Gibbs | 1962 | Rockland, Maine |
| USCGC Towline (WYTL-65605) | Gibbs | 27 March 1962 | Decommissioned in 1995 (Note: Currently Training Vessel Towline owned and operated by Massachusetts Maritime Academy, Buzzard's Bay, Massachusetts) |
| USCGC Catenary (WYTL-65606) | Gibbs | April 1962 | Decommissioned on 1 May 1995 (Note: Currently is Training Vessel Growler owned and operated by U.S. Merchant Marine Academy, Kings Point, New York) |
| USCGC Bridle (WYTL-65607) | Barbour | 3 April 1963 | Southwest Harbor, Maine |
| USCGC Pendant (WYTL-65608) | Barbour | August 1963 | Boston, Massachusetts |
| USCGC Shackle (WYTL-65609) | Barbour | 7 May 1963 | South Portland, Maine |
| USCGC Hawser (WYTL-65610) | Barbour | 17 January 1963 | Bayonne, New Jersey |
| USCGC Line (WYTL-65611) | Barbour | 21 February 1963 | Bayonne, New Jersey |
| USCGC Wire (WYTL-65612) | Barbour | 19 March 1963 | Saugerties, New York |
| USCGC Bitt (WYTL-65613) | Western | 27 May 1963 | Decommissioned on 4 October 1982 (Note: Currently is Research Vessel Clifford A. Barnes owned by the National Science Foundation and operated by the University of Washington, School of Oceanography) |
| USCGC Bollard (WYTL-65614) | Western | 10 April 1967 | New Haven, Connecticut |
| USCGC Cleat (WYTL-65615) | Western | 10 May 1967 | Philadelphia, Pennsylvania |

== Notes ==
Footnotes

Citations

References cited

- "65-foot Small Harbor Tug (WYTL)" (asp). Assets: Aircraft, Boats, and Cutters. U.S. Coast Guard.
- "Barbour Boat Works". Small Shipbuilders and Boatbuilders List. Shipbuilding History.com. Archived from the original on 19 October 2012.
- "Gibbs Gas Engine Company". Small Shipbuilders and Boatbuilders List. Shipbuilding History.com. Archived from the original on 10 October 2011.
- "Governors Island Alternative Transportation Study" (PDF). John A. Volpe National Transportation Systems Center. 2012. Archived from the original (PDF) on 16 October 2011.
- "Marine Facilities". Our Campus. Massachusetts Maritime Academy. Archived from the original on 10 June 2015.
- "R/V Barnes". School of Oceanography website. University of Washington.
- "T/V Growler". About USMMA/Our fleet. U.S. Merchant Marine Academy.
- "USCGC CHOCK (WYTL-65602)" (PDF). Data Sheet (26 September 2012). U.S. Coast Guard.
- "Western Boat Builders Corp". Small Shipbuilders and Boatbuilders List. Shipbuilding History.com. Archived from the original on 3 November 2011.
- Scheina, Robert L. (1990). U.S. Coast Guard Cutters & Craft, 1946–1990. Naval Institute Press, Annapolis, Maryland. ISBN 978-0-87021-719-7.
