= James Nightingale =

James Nightingale may refer to:

- James Nightingale (rugby league) (born 1986), rugby league player
- James Nightingale (cricketer) (1840–1917), English cricketer
- James Nightingale (English footballer)
- James Nightingale (Scottish footballer)
- James Nightingale (Hollyoaks), a character from the British soap opera Hollyoaks
