= Gregg Trahey =

American biomedical engineer

Academic background
- Education: University of Michigan (BS, MS); Duke University (PhD)
- Thesis: Speckle Reduction in Ultrasonic B-mode Images via Spatial Compounding (1985)
- Doctoral advisor: Olaf von Ramm

Academic work
- Discipline: Biomedical engineering
- Sub-discipline: Medical ultrasound; elasticity imaging; image-guided surgery

Gregg E. Trahey is an American biomedical engineer and academic in the field of medical ultrasound. He is the Robert Plonsey Distinguished Professor of Biomedical Engineering at Duke University. In 2022, he was named a fellow of the Institute of Electrical and Electronics Engineers (IEEE) "for contributions to speckle tracking and acoustic radiation force impulse imaging in medical ultrasound".

== Education and early career ==
Trahey attended the University of Michigan, receiving the Bachelor of Science and Master of Science degrees in 1975 and 1979, respectively. After graduation, he joined the Peace Corps, volunteering in Grenada and Dominica. He also worked at ECRI in Plymouth Meeting, Pennsylvania, evaluating medical devices including ultrasound systems. During this time, he met Olaf von Ramm, a professor at Duke University, at an ultrasound research conference. Trahey decided to join von Ramm's lab as a doctoral student at Duke, where he developed techniques to reduce the presence of speckle in ultrasound images. He received the Doctor of Philosophy degree in 1985, and his thesis was titled Speckle Reduction in Ultrasonic B-mode Images via Spatial Compounding.

== Research career ==
Trahey joined the Department of Biomedical Engineering at Duke University as an assistant professor in 1985, and began a joint appointment in the Department of Radiology in 1994. He was subsequently promoted to full professorship in biomedical engineering in 1998. From 2000 to 2005, he was the James L. and Elizabeth M. Vincent Professor of Biomedical Engineering. Since 2013, he has been the Robert Plonsey Distinguished Professor of Biomedical Engineering.

Trahey was named a fellow of the American Institute for Medical and Biological Engineering (AIMBE) "for outstanding contributions in developing novel methods of ultrasonic imaging" in 1999. In 2022, he was named a fellow of the Institute of Electrical and Electronics Engineers (IEEE) "for contributions to speckle tracking and acoustic radiation force impulse imaging in medical ultrasound".

Trahey's research interests include speckle tracking, elastography, and image-guided surgery. His notable doctoral students include Kathryn R. Nightingale and Muyinatu Bell.

== Selected publications ==
- Trahey, Gregg E.; Allison, John W.; von Ramm, Olaf T. (1987). "Angle independent ultrasonic detection of blood flow". IEEE Transactions on Biomedical Engineering. 34 (12): 965–967. doi:10.1109/TBME.1987.325938. PMID 2961682. S2CID 40379203. Wikidata ()
- Bohs, Laurence N.; Trahey, Gregg E. (1991). "A novel method for angle independent ultrasonic imaging of blood flow and tissue motion". IEEE Transactions on Biomedical Engineering. 38 (3): 280–286. doi:10.1109/10.133210. PMID 2066142. S2CID 114511. Wikidata ()
- Nightingale, Kathryn; Soo, Mary S.; Nightingale, Roger; Trahey, Gregg (2002). "Acoustic radiation force impulse imaging: in vivo demonstration of clinical feasibility". Ultrasound in Medicine and Biology. 28 (2): 227–235. doi:10.1016/s0301-5629(01)00499-9. PMID 11937286. Wikidata ()
- Dahl, Jeremy J.; Hyun, Dongwoon; Lediju, Muyinatu; Trahey, Gregg E. (2011). "Lesion Detectability in Diagnostic Ultrasound with Short-Lag Spatial Coherence Imaging". Ultrasonic Imaging. 33 (2): 119–133. doi:10.1177/016173461103300203. PMC 3141297. PMID 21710827. Wikidata ()
- Long, Will; Bottenus, Nick; Trahey, Gregg E. (2020). "Incoherent Clutter Suppression using Lag-One Coherence". IEEE Transactions on Ultrasonics, Ferroelectrics, and Frequency Control. 67 (8): 1544–1557. doi:10.1109/TUFFC.2020.2977200. PMC 8033959. PMID 32142428. Wikidata ()
