= USS Sanderling (AMc-11) =

Minesweeper of the United States Navy

History

United States
- Name: USS Sanderling
- Builder: Harbor Boat Works, Terminal Island, California
- Launched: 1937, as New Conti di Savoia
- Acquired: by purchase, 28 October 1940
- Commissioned: 18 April 1941
- Decommissioned: 18 September 1944
- Stricken: 14 October 1944
- Fate: Sold back to former owner, February 1945

General characteristics
- Type: Coastal minesweeper
- Displacement: 180 long tons (183 t)
- Length: 77 ft 8 in (23.67 m)
- Beam: 20 ft 6 in (6.25 m)
- Draft: 3 ft 9 in (1.14 m)
- Speed: 10 knots (19 km/h; 12 mph)
- Complement: 16
- Armament: 2 × .30 cal (7.62 mm) machine guns

USS Sanderling (AMc-11) was a coastal minesweeper of the United States Navy.

The ship was built in 1937 as the wooden purse seiner New Conti di Savoia by the Harbor Boat Works, Terminal Island, California; was purchased for U.S. Navy use on 28 October 1940 from the New Conti di Savoia Fishing Corp., San Pedro, Los Angeles; converted to a coastal minesweeper by the Al Larson Boat Building, San Pedro, California; and placed in service as Sanderling on 18 April 1941.

== World War II West Coast patrol operations ==
Based at San Diego, Sanderling conducted local minesweeping and patrol operations in the 11th Naval District until placed out of service on 18 September 1944.

== End of War deactivation ==
She was struck from the Navy List on 14 October 1944, sold back to her former owner in February 1945, and delivered to that corporation the following May.
