= USS Nightingale =

USS Nightingale may refer to the following ships of the United States Navy:

- USS Nightingale (1851), was originally a slave ship, captured in 1861, used by the Union Navy in the Civil War and sold in 1865
- USS Nightingale (SP-523), was a motorboat acquired by the US Navy in 1917 and sold in 1919
- USS Nightingale (AMc-18), was a coastal minesweeper acquired by the US Navy in 1940 and returned to the owner in 1944
- USS Nightingale (AMc-149), was acquired by the US Navy in 1941 and struck from the Navy List in 1946
- USS Nightingale (YMS-290), was a minesweeper commissioned in 1943 and struck from the Navy List in 1959

== See also ==
- USS Florence Nightingale
