= Clifford Barnes =

Clifford Barnes may refer to:

- Clifford Barnes (Neighbours), a fictional character from the Australian television series Neighbours
- Cliff Barnes, a fictional character from the American television series Dallas
- RV Clifford A. Barnes, a research vessel
