= Mount Nightingale =

Mount Nightingale can mean

- Mount Nightingale (Turkey), location of House of the Virgin Mary, Turkey
- Mount Nightingale (British Columbia), Canada, named after Florence Nightingale

== See also ==
- Nightingale (disambiguation)
