= Nightingale (surname) =

Nightingale is an English surname, originally a nickname for someone with a good voice. Notable people with this surname include the following:

- The Nightingale Baronetcy, an aristocratic title in the Baronetage of England, created in 1628
- Adam Nightingale (born 1979), American ice hockey coach
- Albert Nightingale (1923–2006), English footballer
- Andrea Nightingale (born 1959), American classical scholar
- Annie Nightingale (1940–2024), English radio broadcaster
- Anthony Nightingale (born 1947), Hong Kong businessman
- Benedict Nightingale (born 1939), British journalist
- Danny Nightingale (pentathlete) (born 1954), British modern pentathlete
- Danny Nightingale (soldier) (born 1975), British soldier
- David Nightingale, English footballer
- Deborah Nightingale, American industrial engineer
- Earl Nightingale (1921–1989), American motivational speaker
- Florence Nightingale (1820–1910), British pioneer of modern nursing and statistician
- Frances Parthenope Verney, née Nightingale (1819–1890), British novelist, economist, social commentator, and journalist.
- James Nightingale (rugby league) (born 1986), Papua New Guinean rugby league player
- James Nightingale (English footballer)
- Jared Nightingale (born 1982), American ice hockey defenceman
- Jason Nightingale (born 1986), New Zealand rugby player
- John Nightingale (actor) (c.1943–1980), British actor
- John Nightingale (figure skater) (born 1928), American figure skater
- John Nightingale (MP) for Leicester (UK Parliament constituency)
- Joseph Nightingale (1775–1824), English writer and preacher
- Kathryn R. Nightingale, American biomedical engineer and academic
- Luke Nightingale (born 1980), English footballer
- Lynn Nightingale (born 1956), Canadian figure skater
- Margie Nightingale (born 1972), Australian politician
- Marie Nightingale (1928–2014), Canadian cookbook writer
- Mark Nightingale (born 1967), British jazz trombonist
- Mary Nightingale (born 1963), English newsreader and television presenter
- Maxine Nightingale (born 1952), British soul music singer
- Michael Nightingale (1922–1999), English actor
- Neil Nightingale, British naturalist and television producer
- Samuel Nightingale (1715 – 1786), justice of the Colonial Rhode Island Supreme Court
- Tunde Nightingale (Earnest Olatunde Thomas) (1922–1981), Nigerian singer and guitarist
- Wally Nightingale (1956–1996), English guitarist of the Sex Pistols
- Will Nightingale (born 1995), English footballer
- William Nightingale (1794–1874), English Unitarian, the father of Florence Nightingale
