= USS Grouse (AMS-15) =

Minesweeper of the United States Navy

Coordinates: 42°40′24″N 70°34′29″W

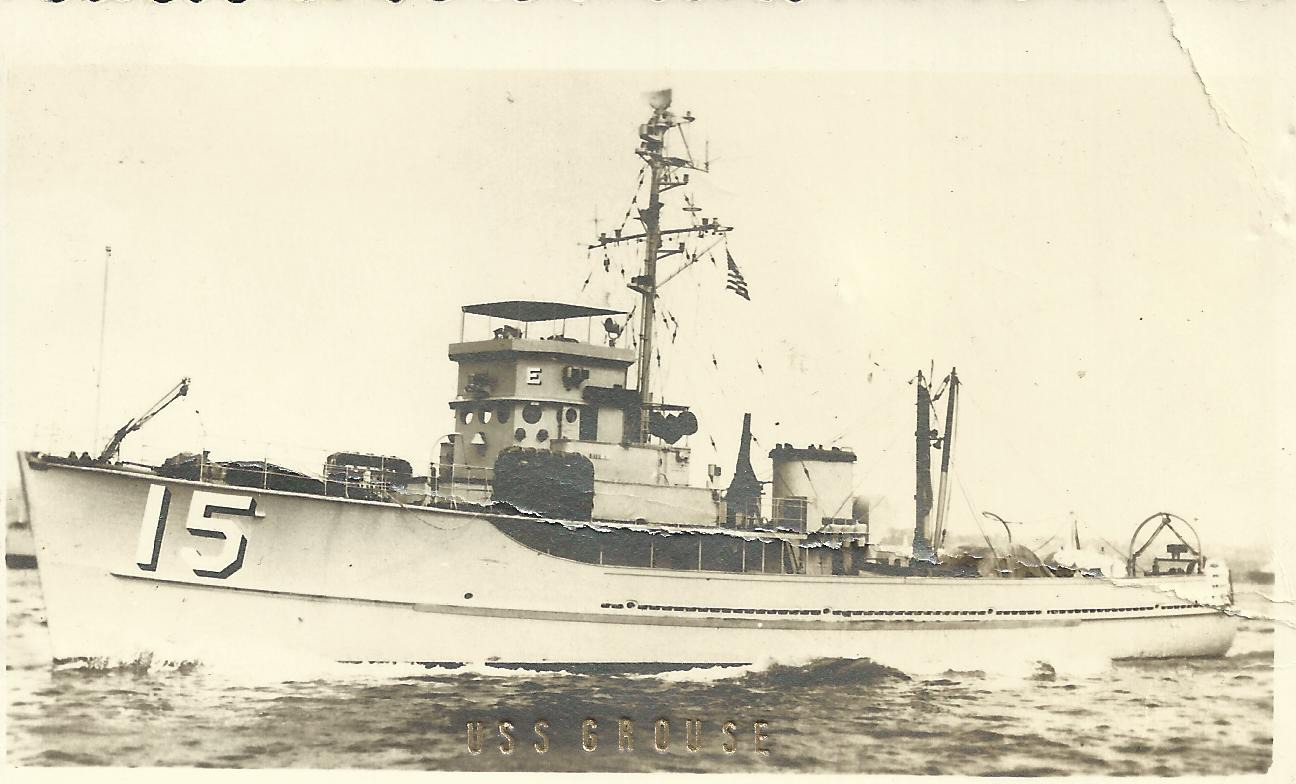
- Minesweeper USS Grouse underway

History

United States
- Name: USS YMS-321
- Builder: Al Larson Boat Building
- Laid down: 29 August 1942
- Launched: 20 February 1943
- Sponsored by: Mrs. H. Doty
- Completed: 25 October 1943
- Commissioned: 25 October 1943
- Renamed: USS Grouse (AMS-15), 18 February 1947
- Namesake: the grouse bird
- Decommissioned: 12 September 1957
- In service: 13 November 1958, Naval Reserve training ship
- Reclassified: MSC(O)-15, 7 February 1955
- Stricken: 28 September 1963
- Fate: Ran aground, 21 September 1963; destroyed by explosives, 23 September 1963

General characteristics
- Class & type: YMS-135 subclass of YMS-1-class minesweepers
- Displacement: 270 tons
- Length: 136 ft (41 m)
- Beam: 24 ft 6 in (7.47 m)
- Draft: 8 ft (2.4 m)
- Propulsion: Two 500 shp (370 kW) General Motors 8-268A diesel engines, two shafts
- Speed: 13 knots (24 km/h)
- Complement: 33
- Armament: One single 3 in (76 mm) gun mount

USS Grouse (AMS-15/YMS-321) was a YMS-1-class minesweeper of the YMS-135 subclass built for the United States Navy during World War II.

== History ==
USS Grouse (AMS-15/YMS-321) was laid down as YMS-321 on 29 August 1942 by Al Larson Boat Building of Terminal Island, California. She was launched on 20 February 1943 sponsored by Mrs. H. Doty. The vessel was completed and commissioned as USS YMS-321, 25 October 1943.

After shakedown and patrol out of San Diego, California, YMS-321 sailed for Pearl Harbor 21 April 1944, arriving 1 May. A month later, she sailed for sweeping and patrol duties in the Guam-Saipan-Tinian area. YMS-321 was also pressed into service as a convoy escort in these staging areas, and on 28 November 1944 was in Tinian harbor during a Japanese air-raid. After escorting a convoy to Eniwetok, she swept the harbor at Maug Island, Marianas, 15 March 1945, and then bombarded the beach the following day. The wooden minesweeper patrolled around Iwo Jima in April 1945 and exploded two floating mines before returning to Saipan.

As the long Pacific War drew to a close, YMS-321 returned to Pearl Harbor 15 August 1945, and from there returned to San Diego, California, 29 August. After overhaul and operations along the West Coast, she sailed for the East Coast 5 April 1946, arriving Charleston, South Carolina, on the 29th. YMS-321 was reclassified AMS-15 on 25 February 1947, and named USS Grouse.

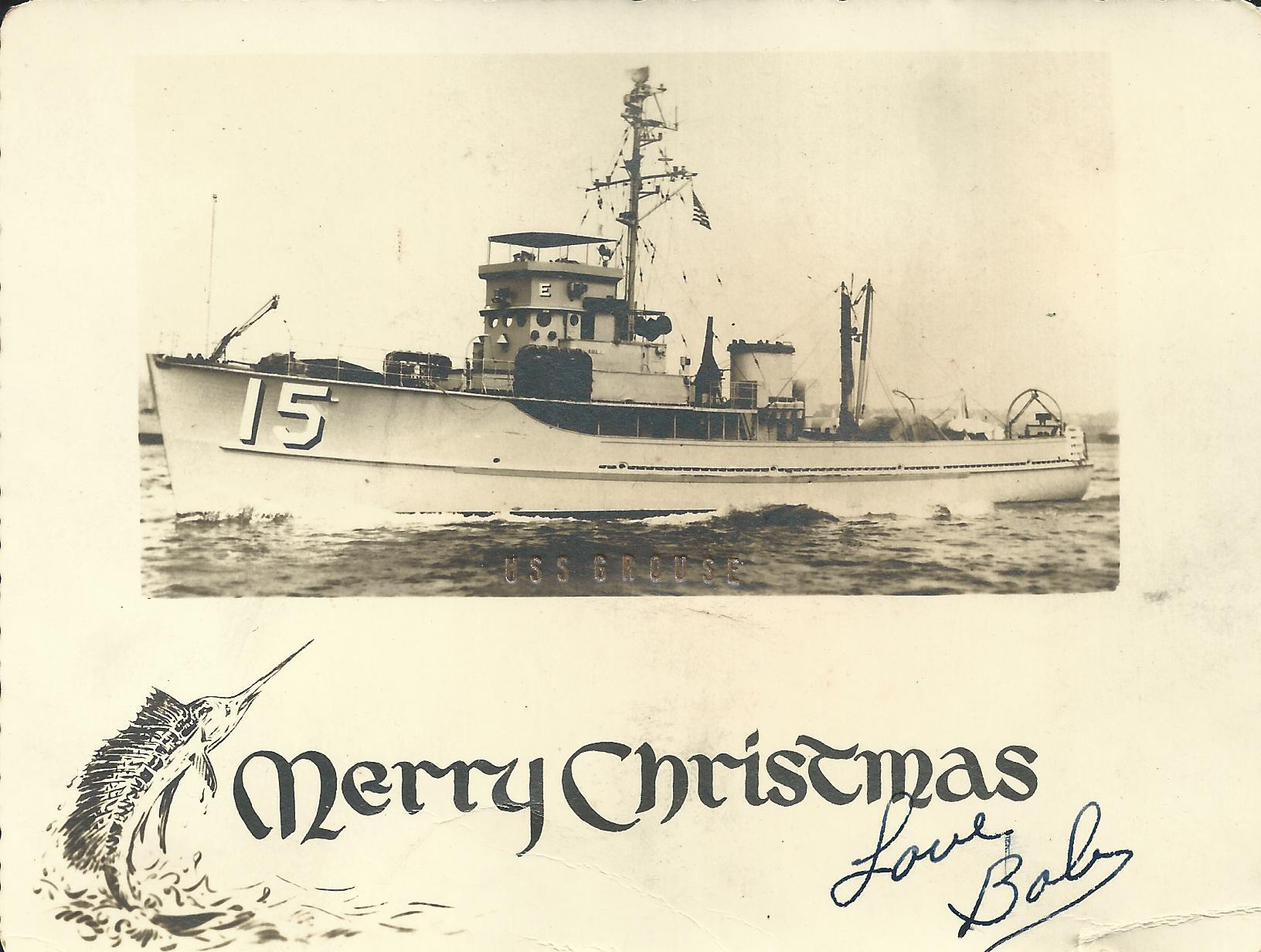
USS Grouse at Christmas

For the next 10 years, the small coastal minesweeper operated along the East Coast in a variety of capacities. Although her primary duty was training student officers and enlisted men at the Mine Warfare School, Yorktown, Virginia, Grouse also participated in experimental work at Countermeasures School and Mine Defense Laboratory, at Panama City, Florida. Various minesweeping exercises and regular overhauls consumed most of the rest of her time. Although in 1954 and 1955, she was attached to the Hydrographic Office for Project Vamp, a special coastal survey along the Virginia and Massachusetts shores.

On 1 March 1955, Grouse was reclassified MSC(O)-15. Sailing to Portland, Maine, 7 September 1957, she decommissioned and was placed in reserve 12 September 1957. Grouse was placed in service, in reserve, 13 November 1958 and proceeded to Portsmouth, New Hampshire, for overhaul. Assigned to the 1st Naval District as a reserve training ship, Grouse was based at Portsmouth and used to train reservists from the area in new minesweeping tactics. This work took her along the New England Coast as well as to Chesapeake Bay and to Charleston, South Carolina.

While on a training mission, Grouse went aground off Rockport, Massachusetts, on the night of 21 September 1963. There were no injuries to the crew, but all efforts to dislodge Grouse from the rocks failed. Grouse was destroyed by explosives 28 September 1963, and her name was struck from the Naval Vessel Register the same day.
