= Western Boat Building Company =

Western Boat Building Company was a company based in Tacoma, Washington from 1916 until 1982. The company was founded by Martin Petrich, Joe M. Martinac and William Vickart. Within a few years, Joe Martinac left the partnership to go to the Tacoma Shipbuilding Company, and later started his own company. William Vickart was killed in an accident in 1921, leaving Martin Petrich the sole owner. In the early 1920s the company was located at the foot of Starr Street on part of the former Tacoma Mill Company property after that property was destroyed in a fire. Later yards were located on East 11th Street 47.254078473380076°N 122.43212757686372°W), D Street, and Marine View Drive. In 1937, the company built the Western Flyer as a purse seiner, and in 1940, this boat carried John Steinbeck on the journey which he documented in The Log from the Sea of Cortez. In 1949, the company launched the largest tuna clipper ever built up to that time, the 150-foot (46 m) Mary E. Petrich. Towards the end of World War II, the company founded its Fairliner division, which made high-speed boats. Before a devastating yard fire in 1950, the company was the largest builder of wooden pleasure boats on the United States West Coast. The company continued to build boats until 1982.

== Shipbuilding ==
During its 65-year history, the firm built hundreds of boats. Among these were:

- USS Nightingale (AMc-149);
- USS Phoebe (AMc-57);
- USS Pintail (AMc-17);
- USS Nightingale (AMc-18);
- Western Flyer;
- USS Alameda (SP-1040);
- USS Road Runner (AMc-35);
- USCGC Bitt (WYTL-65613);
- RV Clifford A. Barnes;
- USCGC Bollard (WYTL-65614);
- USS YP-152 (ex-Western Traveler );
- Mary E. Petrich;
- Western Explorer.

== See also ==
- Seattle-Tacoma Shipbuilding Corporation#Shipbuilding in Puget Sound
