= USS Killdeer (AMc-21) =

Minesweeper of the United States Navy

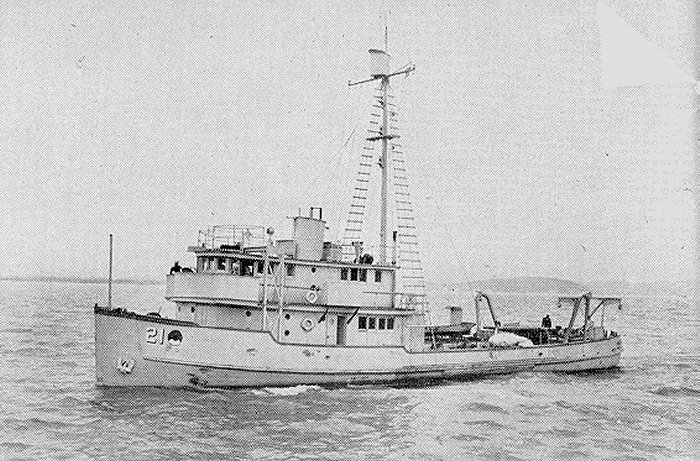
- USS Killdeer c. 1943

History

United States
- Ordered: as Vindicator
- Builder: Al Larson Boat Building
- Laid down: 1930
- Launched: 1930
- Acquired: 8 November 1940
- Commissioned: 8 November 1940
- Decommissioned: 12 September 1944
- In service: 25 September 1944
- Out of service: date unknown
- Stricken: 2 June 1945
- Fate: Disposed of, 9 January 1946, fate unknown

General characteristics
- Type: Minesweeper
- Displacement: 275 tons
- Length: 105 ft 7 in (32.18 m)
- Beam: 22 ft 10 in (6.96 m)
- Draft: 9 ft 8 in (2.95 m)
- Speed: 10.0 knots
- Complement: 18
- Armament: one .50 cal (12.7 mm) machine guns

USS Killdeer (AMc-21) was a unique coastal minesweeper acquired by the U.S. Navy for the dangerous task of removing mines from minefields laid in the water to prevent ships from passing.

Killdeer was originally built as a purse seiner in 1930 by Al Larson Boat Building, Los Angeles, California, with the name of Vindicator; rebuilt in 1940 by Harbor Boat Works, San Pedro, California; acquired by the Navy from her owner, Mr. Martin Trutanich, 8 November 1940; and placed in service the same day as Killdeer.

== World War II service ==
From 9 November 1940 to 17 April 1941 she underwent conversion to AMc-21, and on 8 May 1941 she began service with the 12th Naval District. Operating out of San Francisco, California, Killdeer transferred to the Western Sea Frontier 1 August for further service as a channel minesweeping ship. She continued sweeping shipping lanes in the approaches to San Francisco Bay until 12 September 1944 when she was placed out of service.

== Reclassified as IX-194 ==
Reclassified as IX-194 on 25 September, Killdeer was used by the 12th Naval District as a general utility vessel.

== Final decommissioning ==
Her name was struck from the Naval Register 2 June 1945, and she was turned over to the Maritime Commission for disposal 9 January 1946.
