= USS Alameda (SP-1040) =

Patrol vessel of the United States Navy

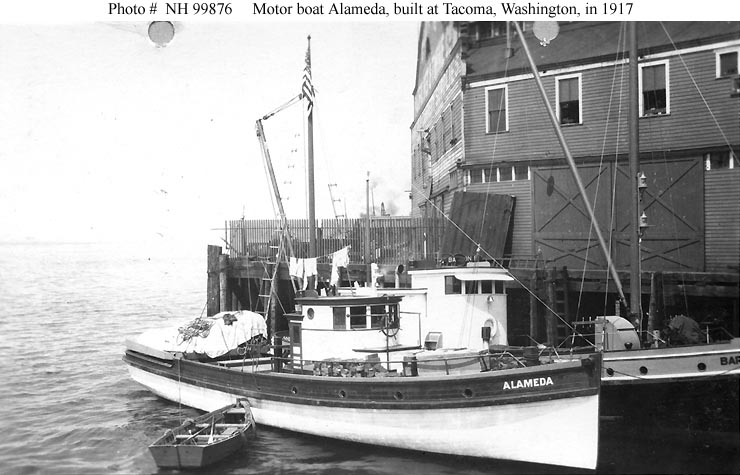
- Alameda in 1917.

History

United States
- Name: USS Alameda (proposed)
- Namesake: Previous name retained
- Builder: Western Boat Building Co, Tacoma, Washington
- Completed: 1917
- Acquired: Never
- Commissioned: Never
- Notes: Registered as SP-1040 for potential U.S. Navy service

General characteristics
- Type: Patrol vessel (proposed)
- Length: 65 ft (20 m)
- Beam: 15 ft 6 in (4.72 m)
- Draft: 7 ft (2.1 m) (aft)
- Speed: 9 knots
- Crew: 9

Note: This ship should not be confused with the steamer Alameda, considered for World War I service as USS Alameda (ID-1432), but also never acquired or commissioned.

USS Alameda (SP-1040) was the proposed designation for a motorboat that never actually served in the United States Navy.

Alameda was a private motorboat built in 1917 by the Western Boat Building Co at Tacoma, Washington, probably for use as a fishing vessel. In the spring of 1917, the U.S. Navy inspected her in for possible World War I service as a patrol boat, and she was registered accordingly with the naval section patrol designation SP-1040. Though her official data card describes her as "brand new well and staunchly built" and contains a note that she was reported to have been delivered to the Navy and commissioned on 2 June 1917. However, no records exist that show that the Navy ever took possession of or commissioned Alameda, and she appears to have had no naval service.
