= USS Phoebe (AMc-57) =

Minesweeper of the United States Navy

History

United States
- Name: Phoebe
- Laid down: 5 December 1940
- Launched: 1941
- Acquired: 31 March 1941
- Commissioned: 2 May 1941
- In service: 1941
- Out of service: 14 May 1956
- Renamed: Western Explorer (1946)
- Stricken: 8 January 1946
- Identification: Official Number: 251283
- Fate: Sold, 27 March 1946. Foundered off Socorro Island, Mexico, 14 May 1956.

General characteristics
- Tonnage: 166 GRT
- Displacement: 176 tons
- Length: 94 ft (29 m)
- Beam: 25 ft 3 in (7.70 m)
- Draught: 6 ft 1 in (1.85 m)
- Speed: 11 knots (20 km/h; 13 mph)
- Complement: 17
- Armament: two .30 cal (7.62 mm) machine guns

USS Phoebe (AMc-57) was a coastal minesweeper acquired by the U.S. Navy for the dangerous task of removing mines from minefields laid in the water to prevent ships from passing.

The first ship to be named Phoebe by the Navy, AMc–57 was laid down by the Western Boat Building Co., Tacoma, Washington, 5 December 1940; launched in 1941; purchased by the Navy 31 March 1941; and commissioned at Tacoma, Washington, 2 May 1941.

== World War II service ==
Phoebe served exclusively in the Northwestern Sea Frontier. In July 1943 she was tactical command ship for a group of four minesweepers that cleared a defensive minefield which had been planted in 1942 to protect Shagak Bay and Bay of Islands, Adak, Alaska. By 4 August, they had exploded more than 340 mines.

Phoebe continued operations as a danlayer in Alaskan waters throughout the remainder of World War II, having been assigned to the Alaskan Sea Frontier. She was ordered to proceed from Dutch Harbor to Seattle, Washington, 21 October 1945 and decommissioned there 17 December 1945.

She was struck from the Navy List 8 January 1946. Phoebe was delivered to the Maritime Commission which sold her to her builder, the Western Boat Building Co., 27 March 1946.
