= Florence Nightingale (disambiguation) =

Florence Nightingale (1820–1910) was an English social reformer and statistician, and the founder of modern nursing.

Florence Nightingale may also refer to:

== Film and television ==
- Florence Nightingale (1915 film), a British silent film by Maurice Elvey, starring Elisabeth Ridson
- "Florence Nightingale", a 1952 Hallmark Hall of Fame episode starring Sarah Churchill
- Florence Nightingale (1985 film), a British TV film by Daryl Duke, starring Jaclyn Smith
- Florence Nightingale, a 1993 Animated Hero Classics episode featuring Lisa Hart
- Florence Nightingale (2008 film), a BBC One television drama starring Laura Fraser

== Other uses ==
- Florence Nightingale Elementary School, Vancouver, British Columbia, Canada
- Florence Nightingale Faculty of Nursing and Midwifery, King's College, London, England, UK
- Florence Nightingale Foundation, a UK charity
- Florence Nightingale Medal, an ICRC award for nursing
- Florence Nightingale Museum, London, England, UK
- Statue of Florence Nightingale, London, England, UK
- USS Florence Nightingale (AP-70), a WWII cargo ship

== People with the given names ==
- Florence Nightingale David (1909–1993), British statistician
- Elizabeth Arden or Florence Nightingale Graham (1881–1966), founder of Elizabeth Arden, Inc.
- Florence Nightingale Levy (1870–1947), American arts administrator

== See also ==
- 3122 Florence
- Florence Nightingale effect, a supposed affliction whereby a caregiver falls in love with a patient
- Florence Nightingale David Award, a statistician award
- Juliet Opie Hopkins (1818–1890), nicknamed "Florence Nightingale of the South", American Civil War C.S. battlefield nurse
- Miss Nightingale, a 1974 British TV film starring Janet Suzman
