= RV Rachel Carson (2017) =

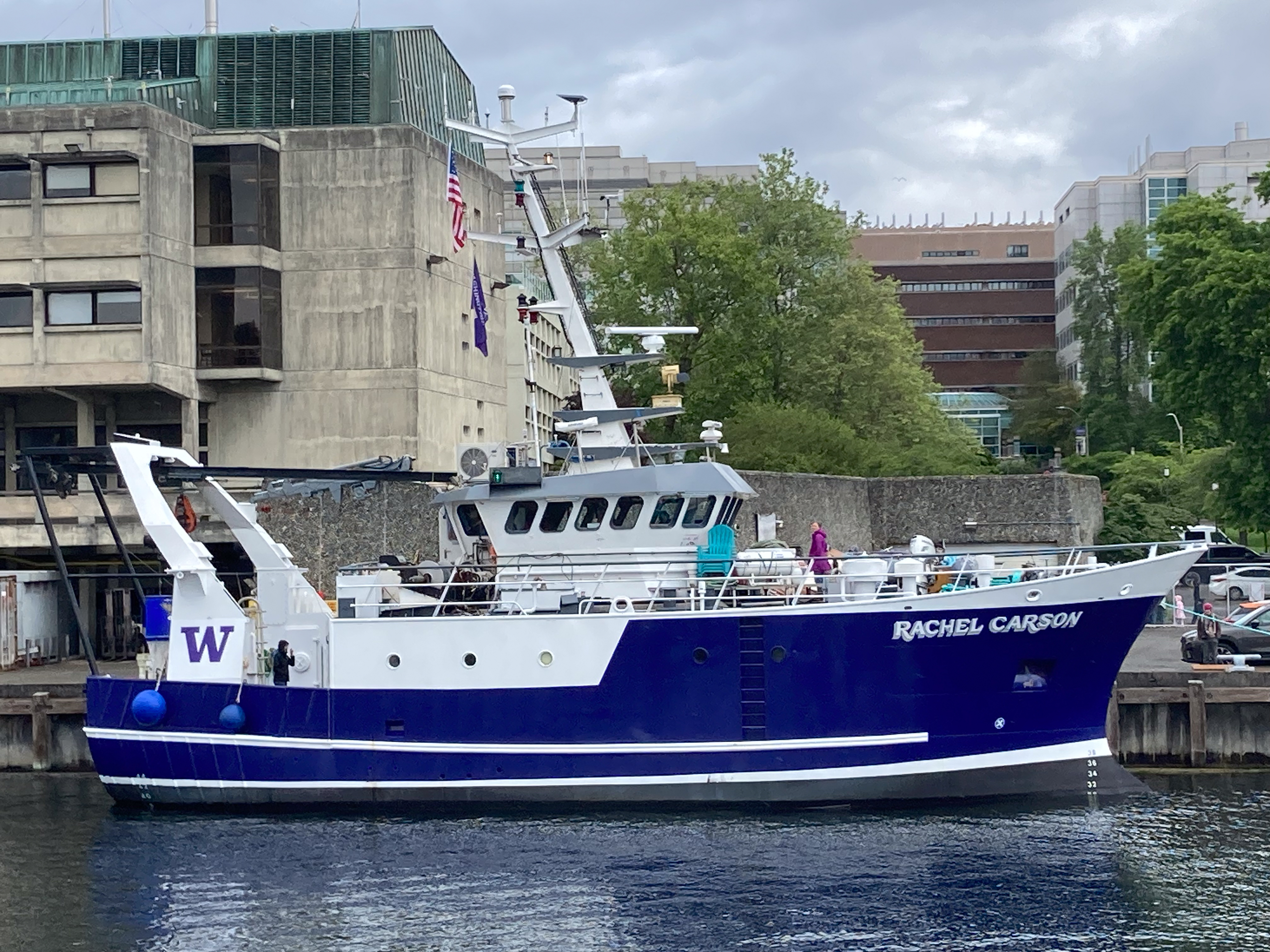
- Rachel Carson in 2024

History

United Kingdom
- Name: R/V Aora
- Operator: University Marine Biological Station Millport
- Builder: MacDuff Shipyard
- Launched: May 2003
- In service: 2003
- Out of service: c.2013
- Identification: IMO number: 9261463; Call sign: VQNK9; MMSI number: 235005810
- Fate: Sold 2017

History

United States
- Name: R/V Rachel Carson
- Namesake: Rachel Carson
- Operator: University of Washington School of Oceanography
- Acquired: 8 August 2017
- In service: 7 April 2018
- Identification: Call sign: VDJ7333; MMSI number: 368005670
- Status: in active service, as of May 2026

General characteristics
- Type: Research vessel
- Tonnage: 168 GT; 50 DWT
- Length: 22 m (72 ft 2 in) o/a
- Beam: 7.82 m (25 ft 8 in)
- Draught: 3.2 m (10 ft 6 in)
- Installed power: Diesel direct drive
- Propulsion: 2 shafts, Bow thruster
- Speed: 10.2 knots (18.9 km/h)

R/V Rachel Carson is a research vessel owned and operated by the University of Washington's School of Oceanography, named in honor of the marine biologist and writer Rachel Carson. The vessel is part of the UNOLS fleet. It is capable of conducting operations within the Salish Sea and coastal waters of the western United States and British Columbia. She can accommodate up to 28 persons, including the crew, for day operations, while up to 13 can be accommodated for multi-day operations.

== Service history ==
=== R/V Aora, 2003–2016 ===
The ship was originally launched in May 2003 at the Macduff Shipyard in Macduff, Scotland, as the R/V Aora, a fisheries research vessel. She was based at the University Marine Biological Station Millport in the Firth of Clyde, until the station was closed in 2013.

=== R/V Rachel Carson, 2017–present ===
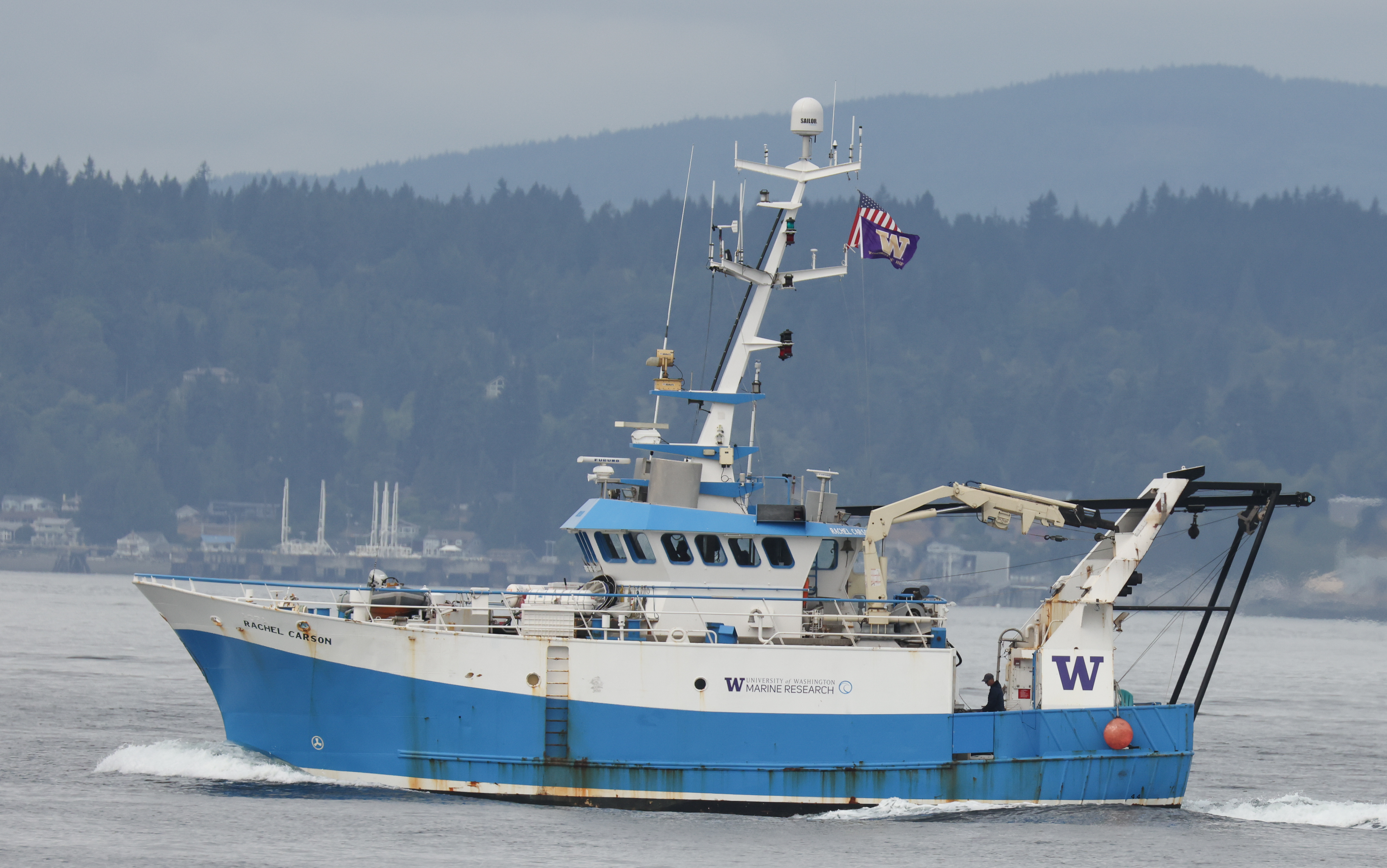
R/V Rachel Carson underway in Puget Sound in 2021

In 2015 the University of Washington's School of Oceanography wanted to replace the fifty-year old RV Clifford A. Barnes, but were unable to raise the funds required to design and build a replacement. In December 2016 they found the Aora for sale on a yacht-trading website. After an inspection in March 2017, the ship was purchased for $1.07m on 8 August 2017, with the aid of a $1m gift. A programme of maintenance and some modifications at the MacDuff yard were completed in October, and the Rachel Carson was transported by ship from Rotterdam to West Palm Beach, Florida by early November. She was then transported to the University of Washington, arriving on 28 December. After further preparations and modifications the ship entered service on 7 April 2018, with a five-day cruise in Puget Sound to collect samples for monitoring by the Washington Ocean Acidification Center. She was accepted as a UNOLS vessel in the U.S. Academic Research Fleet on 24 July.
