= San Pedro Boatworks =

Shipyard in San Pedro, California, United States

Coordinates: 33.715768°N 118.276426°W

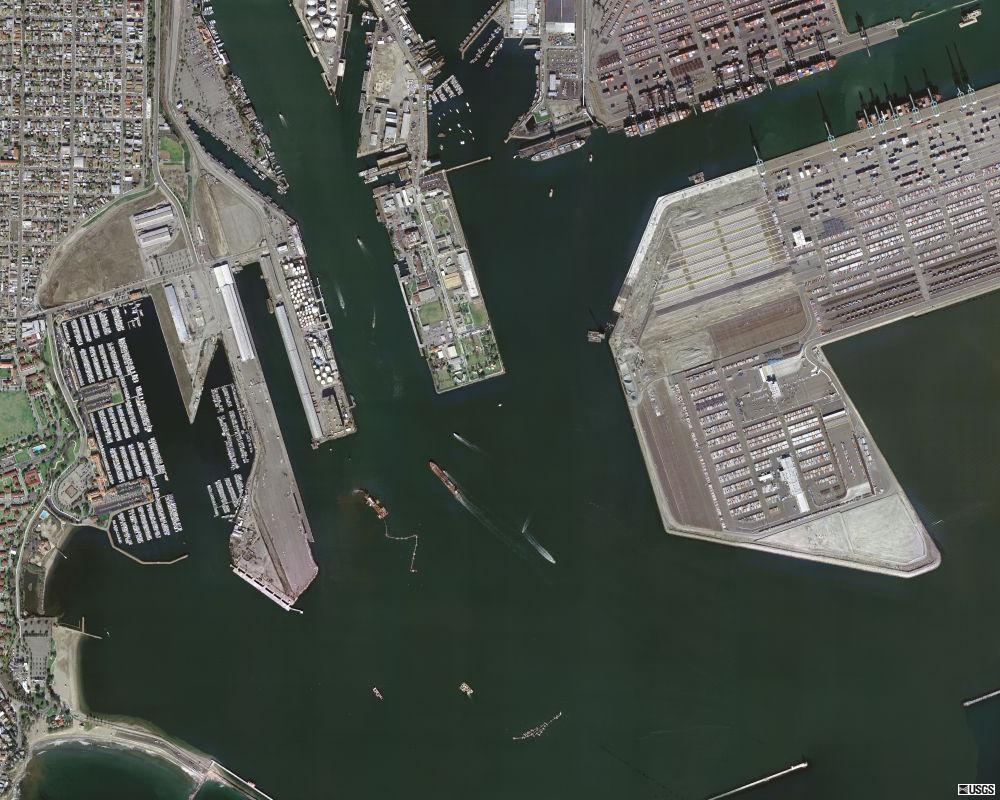
Los Angeles Harbor, Port of Los Angeles, the long thin left-right jetty on the left side point to Berth 44, San Pedro Boatworks

San Pedro Boatworks also called the San Pedro Boat and Yacht Company was a boatyard in San Pedro, California the entrance to the West Channel of Los Angeles Harbor, at berth 44 and next to fire station 110. The boatyard opened in 1923 and closed in 2002, the site has been abandoned since then. The address is 210 Whalers Walk, San Pedro, with the office at 2945 Miner Street. L.A Harbor Marine operated the site from 1965 to 1969. Pacific American also operated the boatyard for many years, owned by San Pedro Boatworks. In 1974 the operation was taken over by Martin Vincent. Later Billfish Inc. took over operations. In 1993, BCI Coca-Cola took over operations. Over the years the yard continued to build and repair boats including military boats, purse seiners, yachts, fireboats, and lifeboats.

Port of Los Angeles is looking to reopen the site as the L.A. Shipyard to serve the local boats. The project is part of the Berth 44 Boatyard Development project. The new yard would work on boats from 40 to 150 feet and maybe larger. The proposed site would be 3 acres of land and one acre of water, located between Berth 46 and the Cabrillo Way Marina. Currently Al Larson Boat Shop is the only operating boatyard in LA.

== World War 2 ==
San Pedro Boatworks built to support World War 2 US Army Patrol Boats. The series was boats J-1828 to J-1854, these 27 gasoline engine, 37-foot wood boats, design # 243 were built in 1944.

== Clean up ==
In 2015 a court case went to the US Ninth Circuit court regards to the "ownership" of the boatyard due clean up work done at the site after its closure. The case was the City of Los Angeles v. San Pedro Boatworks.

== See also ==
- California during World War II
- Maritime history of California
- Wooden boats of World War 2
