= USS YP-152 =

- YP-152 as Western Traveler before conversion to patrol boat

History
- Name: USS YP-152
- Builder: Western Boat Building Company, Tacoma
- Completed: 1936
- Acquired: 18 December 1941
- Out of service: sold, 1946
- Stricken: 8 May 1946
- Identification: 235946
- Honors and awards: American Campaign Medal; World War II Victory Medal
- Fate: Sunk in collision, 1961
- Notes: Call sign: NAMI

General characteristics
- Type: Patrol boat
- Length: 78.8 ft (24.0 m) o/a
- Beam: 23.33 ft (7.11 m)
- Installed power: 300 SHP
- Propulsion: Cooper-Bessemer Diesel engine; 1 × screw

USS YP-152 was a converted fishing vessel which served as an auxiliary patrol boat in the U.S. Navy during World War II.

== History ==
She was laid down as seiner at the Tacoma shipyard of Western Boat Building Company, completed in 1936, and named Western Traveler. On 18 December 1941, she was acquired by the U.S. Navy, designated as a Yard Patrol Craft (YP), and assigned to the 13th Naval District. She was one of the initial ships assigned to the Ralph C. Parker's Alaskan Sector of the 13th Naval District colloquially known as the "Alaskan Navy".

In 1946, she was returned to her former owners. In 1961, she was involved in a collision and sunk in the Grenville Channel off the coast of British Columbia.
