= James Nightingale (cricketer) =

English cricketer

Personal information
- Full name: James Nightingale
- Born: 10 August 1840; Reigate, Surrey, England
- Died: 9 February 1917 (aged 76); Reigate, Surrey, England
- Batting: Unknown
- Bowling: Unknown

Domestic team information
- Years: Team
- 1868: Surrey

Career statistics
Competition	First-class
Matches	1
Runs scored	2
Batting average	–
100s/50s	–/–
Top score	2*
Balls bowled	16
Wickets	–
Bowling average	–
5 wickets in innings	–
10 wickets in match	–
Best bowling	–
Catches/stumpings	1/–
- Source: Cricinfo, 14 April 2013

James Nightingale (10 August 1840 – 9 February 1917) was an English cricketer. Nightingale's batting and bowling styles are unknown. He was born at Reigate, Surrey.

Nightingale made a single first-class appearance for Surrey in 1871 against Sussex at The Oval. In a match which Surrey won by seven wickets, Nightgale batted once in Surrey's first-innings, ending not out on 2. He also bowled four wicketless overs in Sussex's second-innings, conceding 8 runs. This was his only first-class appearance.

He died in the town of his birth on 9 February 1917.
