= Nightingale (Yoshikazu Mera album) =

Live album by Yoshikazu Mera
- Released: 1998
- Genre: Japanese classical

Nightingale is a 1998 recital album of Japanese classical songs by countertenor Yoshikazu Mera.

== Track listing ==
- 1-6 Song of Aiyan, song cycle for voice & piano by Kosaku Yamada
- 7-12 Six Songs for Children, for voice & piano by Ikuma Dan
- 13-15 Japanese Flute, song cycle for voice, flute & piano by Shiro Fukai
- 17-20 Four Songs of Dusk, song cycle for voice & piano by Hikaru Hayashi
- 21 Cherry Blossoms Lane Sadao Bekku
