= USS Nightingale (AMc-18) =

Minesweeper of the United States Navy

History

United States
- Ordered: as Majestic
- Builder: Al Larson Boat Building
- Laid down: date unknown
- Launched: 1934
- Acquired: 5 November 1940
- Commissioned: 31 January 1941
- Decommissioned: c. 1944
- Stricken: 14 October 1944
- Fate: Returned to owner

General characteristics
- Displacement: 197 tons
- Length: 83 ft 2 in (25.35 m)
- Beam: 19 ft 6 in (5.94 m)
- Draft: 9 ft 5 in (2.87 m)
- Propulsion: diesel-powered
- Speed: 11.0 knots
- Complement: 17
- Armament: two .50 cal (12.7 mm) machine guns

USS Nightingale (AMc-18) was a unique coastal minesweeper acquired by the U.S. Navy for the dangerous task of removing mines from minefields laid in the water to prevent ships from passing.

The third ship to be named Nightingale by the Navy, AMc-18 was built by Al Larson Boat Building in San Pedro, California, in 1934 as Majestic, a wooden-hulled, diesel-powered purse seiner. She was acquired by the Navy from Klemente Zar at Western Boat Building Co in Tacoma, Washington, 5 November 1940; and commissioned 31 January 1941.

== World War II service ==
Nightingale operated as a coastal minesweeper in the Puget Sound area. In May she entered the yard at Western Boat Building Co., Tacoma for alteration to a patrol craft and was reclassified YP–166. The name Nightingale was cancelled for YP–166 and reassigned to AMc–149 on 22 April 1942. YP–166 served as a training craft in Puget Sound until 14 October 1944. She was struck from the Navy List 14 October 1944 and returned to her owner.
