= Nightingale Informatix Corporation =

Software company in Canada

- Trade name: Nightingale
- Company type: Public
- Traded as: Formerly TSX-V: NGH
- Industry: Healthcare Information Technology
- Founded: 2002
- Defunct: 2015
- Fate: Acquired
- Successor: Telus Health
- Headquarters: Markham, Ontario, Canada
- Area served: North America
- Key people: Sam Chebib (CEO); Michael Ford (CFO)
- Website: nightingalemd.ca

Nightingale Informatix Corporation, known as Nightingale, was a Canadian company that provided software systems to physicians and health care practitioners. The company was headquartered in Markham, Ontario with five other offices across Canada and the United States. It was acquired by Telus Health in 2015.

Nightingale provided products and services that supported physicians (family physicians and specialists), allied healthcare practitioners, hospitals and other healthcare organizations with their clinical (i.e. electronic medical record (EMR), electronic health record (EHR), Patient Portal) and operational systems such as billing, scheduling, and document management.

Nightingale provided Electronic Health Records (EHR) and Practice Management services, as well as a Patient Portal, revenue cycle management and medical transcription services to solo physicians, group practices and large clinics across the United States and Canada. The EMR/EHR by Nightingale was a web-based program and is hosted in a secure Application Service Provider (ASP) environment.

== History ==
Nightingale Informatix Corporation (NGH: TSX-V) was incorporated in 2002, and acquired the intellectual property rights and assets of Vision MD, which originated in Fredericton, New Brunswick in 1997.

Nightingale ranked no.1 in 2008, Canadian Technology companies' Fast 50 Ranking by Deloitte as an established software as a service (SaaS) technology-based company.

The EHR by Nightingale would be certified by the United States Office of the National Coordinator for Health IT (ONC)-ATCB certified in the summer of 2011, and was OntarioMD, Centers for Medicare and Medicaid Services (CMS) certified for its Electronic Medical Records (EMR) and Electronic Health Records (EHR).

In 2016, Nightingale sold its Canadian assets to Telus Health and renamed the remaining business to Nexia Health Technologies.

== Products ==
- Nightingale On Demand
- Nightingale SmartScribes
- Nightingale Medical Transcription
- myPatientAccess powered by Nightingale
- Nightingale Revenue Cycle Management
