= USCGC Bollard =

United States Coast Guard cutter

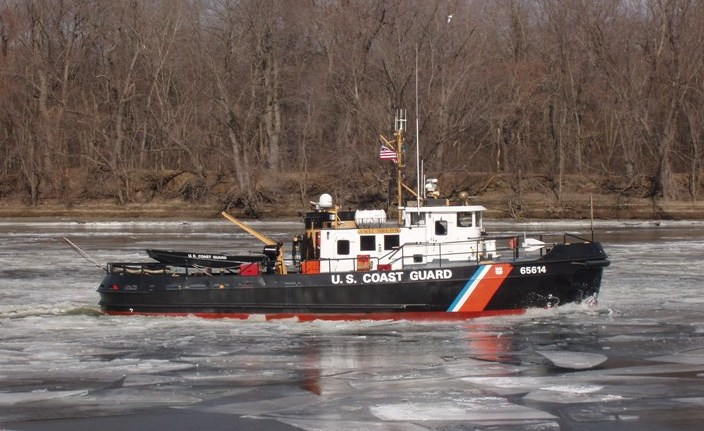
- USCGC Bollard

History

United States
- Name: Bollard
- Builder: Western Boat Building Corporation, Tacoma, Washington
- Laid down: 1966
- Launched: 4 May 1966
- Commissioned: February 1967
- Status: in active service

General characteristics
- Displacement: 72 tons
- Length: 65 ft 11.5 in (20.104 m)
- Beam: 19 ft 7 in (5.97 m)
- Draft: 6 ft 11 in (2.11 m)
- Installed power: 2 x Onan, 25 kW generators
- Propulsion: 1 x Caterpillar 3412DIT 12-cylinder Turbocharged Diesel; 500 shaft horsepower
- Speed: 11 kn (20 km/h; 13 mph)
- Range: 3,820 nmi (7,070 km)
- Boats & landing craft carried: 1 x 14 ft (4.3 m) work boat, Mercury 4-stroke 40 hp
- Complement: 7
- Armament: None

USCGC Bollard (WYTL-65614) is a cutter in the U.S. Coast Guard.

Bollard is a small icebreaking harbor tug that operates in Long Island Sound and north to Narragansett Bay. Her homeport is New London, Connecticut. She was constructed at Western Boat, in Tacoma, Washington in 1966 and was commissioned in February 1967. As an icebreaking tug, the ship breaks ice on the Connecticut River in the winter to allow commercial traffic to pass.

In warmer weather, Bollard serves many missions including servicing aids to navigation, search and rescue and law enforcement. Bollard and her crew conduct search and rescue operations as necessary regardless of the time of year. The officer-in-charge is a chief boatswain's mate.

Bollard was awarded the Coast Guard Unit Commendation for service during the period of 2 July 1986 to 6 July 1986.

On 26 February 2015, Bollard was featured in a news story about Coast Guard ice breaking operations on National Public Radio. In January 2018, Bollard was damaged during icebreaking operations on the Connecticut River.
