= USS Nightingale (AMc-149) =

Minesweeper of the United States Navy

History

United States
- Ordered: as Saint Francis
- Builder: Western Boat Building Co
- Laid down: 1940
- Launched: 1940
- Acquired: 13 December 1941
- Commissioned: 13 December 1941
- In service: 1941
- Out of service: 3 December 1945
- Stricken: 7 February 1946
- Fate: Disposed

General characteristics
- Displacement: 160 tons
- Length: 93 ft (28 m)
- Beam: 22 ft 0 in (6.71 m)
- Draft: 9 ft 5 in (2.87 m)
- Propulsion: Diesel powered
- Speed: 11.0 knots
- Complement: 17
- Armament: four machine guns

USS Nightingale (AMc-149) was a coastal minesweeper acquired by the U.S. Navy for the dangerous task of removing mines from minefields laid in the water to prevent ships from passing.

The fourth Nightingale was built by Western Boat Building Co., Tacoma, Washington, in 1940 as Saint Francis, a wooden hulled, diesel-powered purse seiner. She was acquired by the Navy from her owner, Hubert Ursich, at Tacoma 13 December 1941. Designated YP–150, she performed district patrol duties in the Seattle, Washington, area.

== World War II service ==
YP-150 entered the Western Boat Building Co. yard at Tacoma 21 December for conversion to a coastal minesweeper. Renamed Nightingale 22 April 1942, she was placed in service as AMc-149 at Seattle 21 May. Redesignated IX-177 on 10 July 1944, after all the minesweeping equipment had been removed, she continued operations in the Puget Sound area. These included utility services with the Torpedo Training Program out of Whidbey Island Naval Air Station. She was placed out of service 3 December 1945 at the Puget Sound Naval Shipyard, Bremerton, Washington, struck from the Navy List 7 February 1946, and returned to the War Shipping Administration for disposal.
