= SS Nightingale =

A number of ships have been named Nightingale, including:

- SS Nightingale (1905), wrecked in January 1933
- SS Nightingale (1939), a Type C2 cargo ship
