= Al Larson Boat Shop =

Shipyard in San Pedro, California, United States

Coordinates: 33.73378°N 118.26862°W

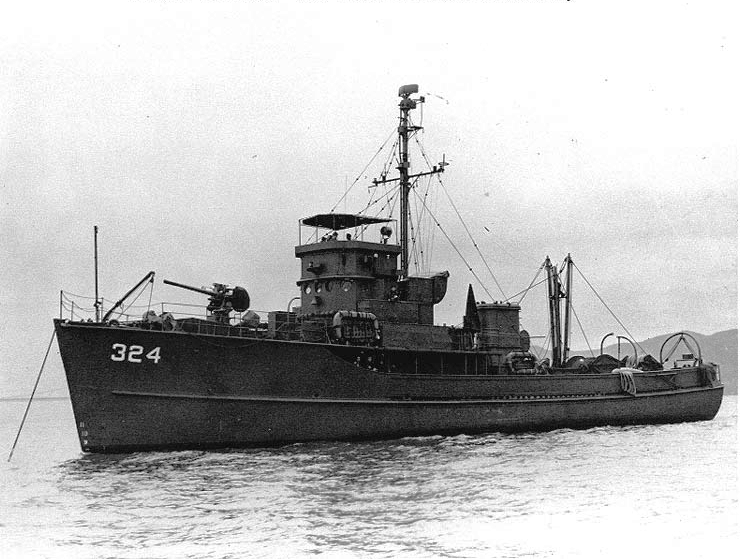
USS YMS-324 in San Francisco Bay, in 1945

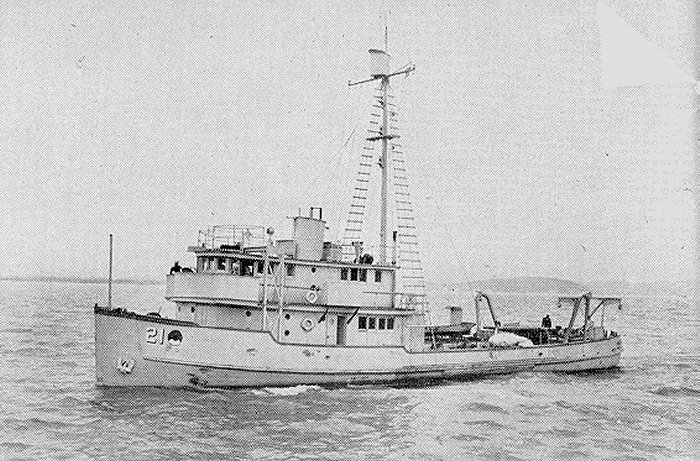
USS Killdeer (AMc-21) in 1943

Al Larson Boat Shop or Al Larson Boat Building is a shipbuilding and dry dock repair company in San Pedro, California on Terminal Island. To support the World War II demand for ships Al Larson Boat Shop built: US Navy Sub chasers and Minesweepers. Al Larson Boat Shop was started in 1903 by Peter Adolph (Al) Larson, a Swedish immigrant. Larson started by building boats by hand from Pacific Northwest lumber. As the shop grew, he moved to its current location in Fish Harbor, in the Port of Los Angeles. Adolph Larson's son sold the boat shop in 1960 to Andy and Gloria Wall. The shop was small at this time with only five employees. The Wall family is still running the shipyard in the Port of Los Angeles. The shipyard is the only one in the Port of Los Angeles now operating and able to work on ships of all sizes with its 100 employees. The shipyard is at 1046 South Seaside Ave, Terminal Island, with 2.35 acres of land and 5.35 acres of waterways. The shipyard also runs a marina, Al Larson Marina.

== Notable ships ==
- YMS-1-class minesweeper: USS Gull (AMS-16) and USS Grouse (AMS-15).
- Converted to Minesweeper and reefer ship: USS YP-345, USS Nightingale (AMc-18) and USS Killdeer (AMc-21)
- SC-734 US Navy Sub Chaser, Patrol Boat, Keel laid 4/15/42. Launched 7/18/42. Commissioned 12/28/42. Transferred to Foreign in 4/25/47.
- SC-735 US Navy Sub Chaser, Patrol Boat, Keel laid 4/20/42. Launched 8/29/42. Commissioned 3/12/43. Transferred to China in 6/30/48. The two SC-497-class submarine chasers had one 40mm AA gun, two .50 cal. machine guns, two depth charge projector "Y Guns," and two depth charge tracks. Powered by two 880bhp General Motors 8-268A diesel engines.
- AB-67 renamed CG-56306, harbor tug built in 1937. Were 32 tons, top speed 11-knots. 56 feet long, a beam of 14 feet, a draft of 4.5 feet, powered by a 150 H.P diesel, was stationed in San Francisco.
- AB-68 renamed CG-56307, harbor tug was stationed in Seattle. Specs same as AB-67.

Ship ID	Name	Owner	Type	Tons	Feet Long	Delivered	Notes
217945	Esperanza		Fishing Vessel	34	50	1919	Active
251017	Elsie B		Fishing Vessel	22	42	1926	Renamed to New Hazard
226245	Lusitania	Manuel G. Rosa	Fishing Vessel	138	91	1927	
227967	Sacramento	Alfred Santos	Fishing Vessel	201	103	1928	
252776	Katrina		Fishing Vessel	16	40	1928	Renamed to Ogenio
229947	Bremen	Toma Mosich	Fishing Vessel	127	79	1930	
231534	Panama	Japanese owners	Fishing Vessel	246	107	1930	
229339	Rainbow	Joseph Giaconi	Fishing Vessel	121	79	1930	
229335	Senator	Joe P. Soares	Fishing Vessel	118	79	1930	
231078	Reliance	Herman Toby	Fishing Vessel	313	117	1931	Renamed to passenger vessel Ranger III, Hacklehead II
230641	San Salvador	Manuel M. Medina	Fishing Vessel	156	113	1931	To USN in 1942 as Patrol Vessel, YP 281, lost in 1944
231083	Santa Margarita	Franco Italian Pk'g.	Fishing Vessel	236	98	1931	Renamed to St Marie, Emerald C
223573	Majestic	Klemento Zar	Fishing Vessel	197	83	1934	To USN in 1940 as USS Nightingale (AMc-18), YP 166 1941, returned 1945
233381	Jackie Sue	Christian Gaspar	Fishing Vessel	197	83	1934	To USN 1940 as Parrakeet (AMc 34), to MARAD 1946
231372	Fearless	Paul Vasovich	Fishing Vessel	127	87	1935	To USN 1940 as Reedbird (AMc 30), to MARAD 1946, Renamed to Fearless, Star-Kist, now Colorado (Chile)
235490	Vittoria	Salvatore Ferranta	Fishing Vessel	63	75	1936	To USN 1942 as YP 298, to MARAD 1946, Renamed to Vittoria (Peru)
236505	Bainbridge	Sam Mirkovich	Fishing Vessel	130	79	1937	Broken up 1997
236806	Santa Maria	Santa Maria Fishing	Fishing Vessel	86	79	1937	Active
238878	American Voyager	Van Camp Seafood	Fishing Vessel	137	97	1937	To USN 1942 as YP 287, destroyed 1947
	Vindicator		Fishing Vessel	110	106	1937	To USN 1940 as USS Killdeer (AMc-21), IX 194 in 1944, to MARAD in 1945
1099490	CG 67	US Coast Guard	Harbor tug, Boarding Boat	33	56	1937	Renamed to CG 56306 (call sign NRHJ), to Sea Scouts as Sea Otter
560021	CG 68	US Coast Guard	Harbor tug, Boarding Boat	33	56	1937	Renamed to CG 56307 (Call sign NRHK), sold as Lisa Lynn, Renamed to Once Bitten, now High Plains Drifter
	SC 734	US Navy	Sub Chaser	148d	110	28-Dec-42	To Fleet Logistics Center in 1948
	SC 735	US Navy	Sub Chaser	148d	110	12-Mar-43	To Taiwan 1948
	YMS 86	US Navy	Minesweeper	320d	136	12-May-42	Struck 1946
254281	YMS 87	US Navy	Minesweeper	320d	136	15-Aug-42	Sold as f/v Lee Russ, Renamed to Jane M
	YMS 320	US Navy	Minesweeper	320d	136	18-Aug-43	Struck In 1946
	YMS 321	US Navy	Minesweeper	320d	136	25-Oct-43	Renamed to USS Grouse (AMS-15) in 1947, wrecked 1963
253722	YMS 322	US Navy	Minesweeper	320d	136	19-Nov-43	Renamed to pilot boat Golden Gate, then f/v,
	YMS 323	US Navy	Minesweeper	320d	136	27-Dec-43	To Korea 1948 as Ku Po, scrapped 1956
	YMS 324	US Navy	Minesweeper	320d	136	28-Feb-44	Renamed to USS Gull (AMS-16) in 1947, struck 1959
	YMS 325	US Navy	Minesweeper	320d	136	7-Apr-44	Struck 1946
246153	Pioneer	Marion Joncich	Fishing Vessel	183	86	1944	Renamed to Southern Explorer.
246274	Seven Seas	Elmer J. Duzich	Fishing Vessel	129	78	1944	Active as freight ship
246533	City of Naples II	Francesco Amalfitano	Fishing Vessel	110	73	1944	Renamed to Santa Teresa, Annie D
248199	Sea Hound	Joaquin Pedro	Fishing Vessel	247	97	1945	Renamed to Irene S, America, Tesoro del Mar (Mexico)
265818	Pacific Venture	William J. Danos	Fishing Vessel	45	50	1953	Active

== See also ==
- California during World War II
- Maritime history of California
- Wooden boats of World War 2
- San Pedro Boatworks
