= USCGC Swivel =

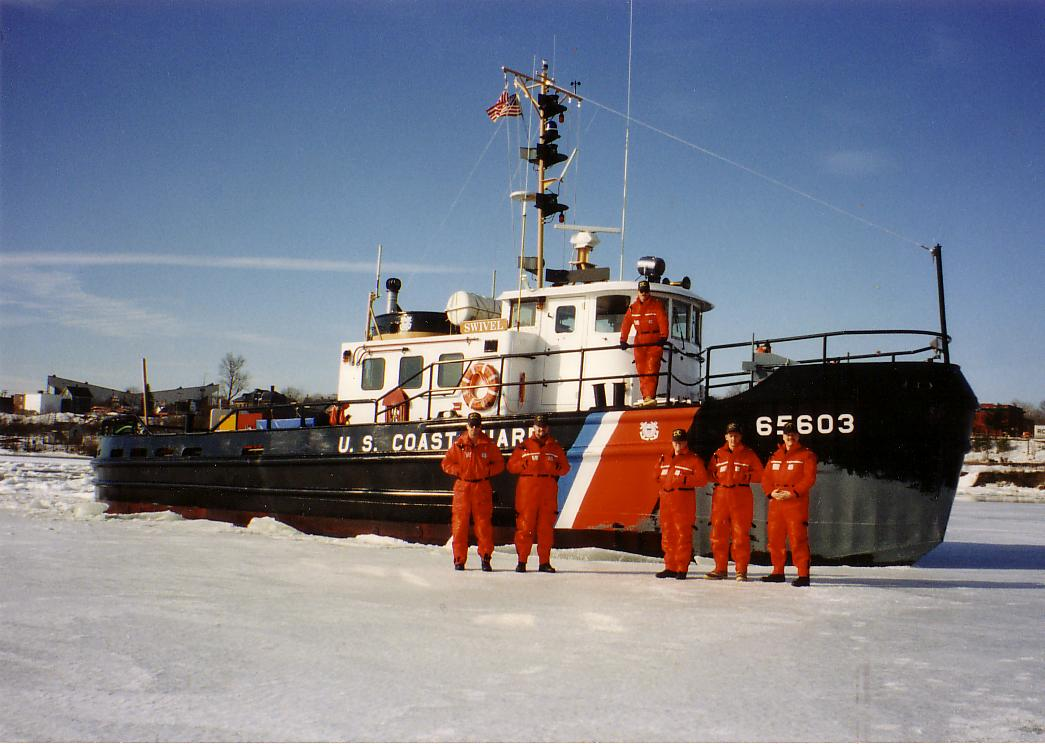
- USCGC Swivel ice-breaking at Bangor, Maine on the Penobscot River, in January 1991

History

United States
- Name: USCGC Swivel (WYTL-65603)
- Builder: Gibbs Gas Engine Co., Jacksonville, Florida
- Cost: $158,366
- Commissioned: 27 October 1961
- Decommissioned: 14 April 1995
- Status: in active service, as of 2015

General characteristics
- Class & type: 65-foot Harbor tug
- Displacement: 74 long tons (75 t)
- Length: 64 ft 11 in (19.79 m)
- Beam: 19 ft 1 in (5.82 m)
- Draft: 9 ft (2.7 m)
- Propulsion: 1 × 400 bhp (298 kW) diesel engine, single screw
- Speed: 10.6 knots (19.6 km/h; 12.2 mph)
- Range: 3,690 nmi (6,830 km; 4,250 mi) at 7 kn (13 km/h; 8.1 mph)
- Complement: 10
- Sensors & processing systems: SPN-11 detection radar
- Armament: None

USCGC Swivel (WYTL-65603) was one of fifteen 65-foot steel-hulled harbor tugs, that entered service with the United States Coast Guard in the 1960s. Each was built to replace the 64-foot wooden-hulled harbor tugs built during the 1940s.

== Ship history ==
USCGC Swivel was built by the Gibbs Gas Engine Company of Jacksonville, Florida, at a cost of $158,000. She was commissioned on 27 October 1961. The 65-footers remained unnamed until the mid-1960s. Swivel was assigned to the First Coast Guard District and was based in Rockland, Maine. Her crew consisted of an Officer in Charge (OINC), a Chief Boatswain Mate (E-7); an Executive Petty Officer (XPO), a First Class Boatswain Mate (E-6); an Engineering Petty Officer (EPO), a First Class Machinist Mate (E-6); a Second Class Machinist Mate (E-5) and three non-rated crew (E-3 or E-2).

Swivel's area of operation was mainly Penobscot Bay and extended westward to Whitehead Lighthouse, easterly to Saddleback Ledge and northward through East Penobscot Bay, Castine, and up the Penobscot River to the city of Bangor, Maine. Swivel's operations throughout the year included domestic icebreaking, aids to navigation, search and rescue, marine environmental protection, maritime law enforcement and commercial fishing vessel safety.

Swivel's main mission in the summer months was to maintain more than fifty fixed (non-floating) Coast Guard aids to navigation, including five lighthouses. During the winter months the Swivel kept local harbors free of ice and spent a week in rotation with two other cutters keeping the Penobscot River open to navigation for fuel barges that transported home heating fuel, gasoline and aviation fuel to Bangor and the surrounding communities.

Swivel received a Coast Guard Unit Commendation and two Meritorious Unit Commendations for her missions, along with the Coast Guard Unit Commendation presented to all 1st Coast Guard District units involved with the 1994 ice season.

Swivel was decommissioned at a ceremony held at the pier in Rockland, Maine, on 14 April 1995.

As part of the Coast Guard's closing of its base on Governors Island in New York City, the Swivel was brought down as a passenger and work boat for the Coast Guard and U.S. General Services Administration base closure staff.

As of 2015 Swivel is now a service and staff boat owned by the Trust for Governors Island, which is redeveloping the former Coast Guard base at Governors Island, New York City, and is operated by HMS Global Maritime.
