= Kathryn R. Nightingale =

American biomedical engineer

Academic background
- Education: Duke University (BS, PhD)
- Thesis: Ultrasonic Generation and Detection of Acoustic Streaming to Differentiate Between Fluid-Filled and Solid Lesions in the Breast (1997)
- Doctoral advisor: Gregg Trahey

Academic work
- Discipline: Biomedical engineering
- Sub-discipline: Medical ultrasound; elasticity imaging; acoustic radiation force
- Website: Lab website

Kathryn Radabaugh Nightingale is an American biomedical engineer and academic in the field of medical ultrasound. She is the Theo Pilkington Distinguished Professor of Biomedical Engineering at Duke University, and an elected fellow of the American Institute for Medical and Biological Engineering (AIMBE) and the National Academy of Inventors (NAI).

== Education ==
As a freshman at Duke University, Nightingale was a member of the 1985–86 Duke Blue Devils women's basketball team and made the Atlantic Coast Conference Honor Roll for that year. While at Duke, she met her future husband, Roger Nightingale. She received the Bachelor of Science degree in 1989.

After spending three years in Texas stationed with the U.S. Army, Nightingale returned to Duke for her doctoral studies, conducting research under the supervision of Gregg Trahey. During this time, she studied the use of acoustic radiation force for imaging breast cysts and lesions. Nightingale received the Doctor of Philosophy degree in 1997, and her thesis was titled Ultrasonic Generation and Detection of Acoustic Streaming to Differentiate Between Fluid-Filled and Solid Lesions in the Breast.

== Career ==
Nightingale joined the Department of Biomedical Engineering at Duke University as an assistant research professor in 1998, and then as an assistant professor in 2004. In 2011, she was named the James L. and Elizabeth M. Vincent Associate Professor of Biomedical Engineering, and was subsequently promoted to full professorship in biomedical engineering in 2016. Since 2019, she has been the Theo Pilkington Distinguished Professor of Biomedical Engineering. In 2023, she became the director of graduate studies for the Department of Biomedical Engineering at Duke.

Nightingale's research interests include elastography, acoustic radiation force, and nonlinear acoustics.

== Recognition ==
She was elected a fellow of the American Institute for Medical and Biological Engineering (AIMBE) in 2015 "for pioneering the development of Acoustic Radiation Force Impulse elasticity imaging, which is now employed world-wide to stage hepatic fibrosis". In 2019, she was elected a fellow of the National Academy of Inventors (NAI). She was appointed a four-year term on the National Advisory Council for Biomedical Imaging and Bioengineering, part of the National Institutes of Health, in 2020. In 2021, she received the IEEE Carl Hellmuth Hertz Ultrasonics Award from the IEEE Ultrasonics, Ferroelectrics, and Frequency Control Society "for pioneering contributions to the field of radiation force imaging and measurements", and in 2022, she received the Joseph H. Holmes Basic Science Pioneer Award from the American Institute of Ultrasound in Medicine. She was named to the 2026 class of IEEE Fellows, "for development, commercialization, and clinical translation of non-invasive ultrasound elasticity imaging technology".

== Selected publications ==
- Nightingale, Kathryn R.; Palmeri, Mark L.; Nightingale, Roger W.; Trahey, Gregg E. (2001). "On the feasibility of remote palpation using acoustic radiation force". The Journal of the Acoustical Society of America. 110 (1): 625–634. Bibcode:2001ASAJ..110..625N. doi:10.1121/1.1378344. PMID 11508987. Wikidata ()
- Nightingale, Kathryn; Soo, Mary S.; Nightingale, Roger; Trahey, Gregg (2002). "Acoustic radiation force impulse imaging: in vivo demonstration of clinical feasibility". Ultrasound in Medicine and Biology. 28 (2): 227–235. doi:10.1016/S0301-5629(01)00499-9. PMID 11937286. Wikidata ()
- Nightingale, Kathryn; McAleavey, Stephen; Trahey, Gregg (2003). "Shear-wave generation using acoustic radiation force: in vivo and ex vivo results". Ultrasound in Medicine and Biology. 29 (12): 1715–1723. doi:10.1016/j.ultrasmedbio.2003.08.008. PMID 14698339. Wikidata ()
- Palmeri, Mark L.; Sharma, Amy C.; Bouchard, Richard R.; Nightingale, Roger W.; Nightingale, Kathryn R. (2005). "A Finite-Element Method Model of Soft Tissue Response to Impulsive Acoustic Radiation Force". IEEE Transactions on Ultrasonics, Ferroelectrics, and Frequency Control. 52 (10): 1699–1712. doi:10.1109/tuffc.2005.1561624. PMC 2818996. PMID 16382621. Wikidata ()
- Palmeri, Mark L.; Wang, Michael H.; Dahl, Jeremy J.; Frinkley, Kristin D.; Nightingale, Kathryn R. (2008). "Quantifying Hepatic Shear Modulus In Vivo Using Acoustic Radiation Force". Ultrasound in Medicine and Biology. 34 (4): 546–558. doi:10.1016/j.ultrasmedbio.2007.10.009. PMC 2362504. PMID 18222031. Wikidata ()
