= USCGC Bitt =

History

United States
- Name: Bitt
- Namesake: A bitt is a vertical post set on the deck of a ship for securing cables.
- Builder: Western Boat Building Corp Tacoma, Washington
- Commissioned: 27 May 1966
- Decommissioned: 4 October 1982
- In service: 10 April 1984 as RV Clifford A. Barnes
- Out of service: December 2018
- Fate: Transferred to National Science Foundation, October 1982 Sold at auction June 2019
- Status: Active as Pleasure Craft MV BITT Home Port Benicia California

General characteristics
- Class & type: 65 foot–harbor tug
- Displacement: 74 tons
- Length: 64 ft 11 in (19.79 m)
- Beam: 19 ft 1 in (5.82 m)
- Draft: 9 ft (2.7 m)
- Propulsion: 1 Caterpillar D379 V-8 diesel; 550 shaft horsepower
- Speed: (cruising) 7.0 kn (13.0 km/h; 8.1 mph)
- Range: (cruising) 3,690 nmi (6,830 km)
- Complement: 8
- Armament: none

USCGC Bitt (WYTL-65613) was a cutter in the U.S. Coast Guard. Constructed by Western Boat Building Corp and commissioned in 1966, the vessel served as part of the USCG for sixteen years before being decommissioned in 1982 and transferred to the National Science Foundation (NSF). During her Coast Guard service, Bitt was based in Washington and Alaska, where she was utilized mainly in a law enforcement and search and rescue (SAR) role. She was purchased by a civilian couple living and raising their first child aboard the vessel.

== Construction and design ==
Crewed by five personnel, Bitt was a small vessel displacing 74 tons. She was 64 ft 11 in (19.79 m) long, with a beam of 19 ft 1 in (5.82 m) and a 9 ft (2.7 m) draft. The vessel's main drive engine consisted of one Caterpillar D379 V-8 diesel, which produced 400 shaft horsepower and drove a single propeller, giving a cruising speed of 7.0 kn (13.0 km/h; 8.1 mph) and a cruising range of 3,690 nmi (6,830 km). Her maximum speed was 10.6 kn (19.6 km/h; 12.2 mph), where she could patrol 1,130 nmi (2,090 km). She carried no armament but was fitted with a SPN-11 detection radar. Upon completion, she cost a total of $US 158,366 to construct.

== History ==
Bitt was one of fifteen steel-hulled icebreaking small harbor tugs that were put into service in the 1960s to replace 64 ft (20 m) wooden-hulled harbor tugs that the Coast Guard had used since the 1940s. She was initially homeported at Bellingham, Washington where her duties included law enforcement, SAR, and ice operations. On 5 January 1969, she assisted in evacuating a stranded person near the Nooksack River when a dike broke. On 29 July 1969, she towed the disabled fishing vessel Jet Stream to safety from Admiralty Inlet. On 20 October 1975, she rescued two persons from a capsized sailboat. She transferred to Valdez, Alaska in 1978. She was decommissioned in October 1982 and transferred to the National Science Foundation for use as the Research Vessel Clifford A. Barnes. After serving through an agreement with the University of Washington School of Oceanography research facilities in Seattle, Washington, the University of Washington decommissioned the vessel at the end of 2018. She was purchased at auction by a civilian couple in 2019, who renamed her back to Bitt. The couple currently live aboard her with their child in Northern California.

== Notes ==
Citations

References

- "R/V Barnes". School of Oceanography website. University of Washington.
- "MODIFICATIONS TO CONVERT THE FORMER USCGC BITT TO A RESEARCHVESSEL". Access to Archival Databases (AAD). The National Archives Administration (NARA), aad.archives.gov.
- Scheina, Robert L. (1990). U.S. Coast Guard Cutters & Craft, 1946-1990. Naval Institute Press, Annapolis. ISBN 978-0-87021-719-7.
- National Science Foundation News article on RV Clifford A. Barnes
