= RV Clifford A. Barnes =

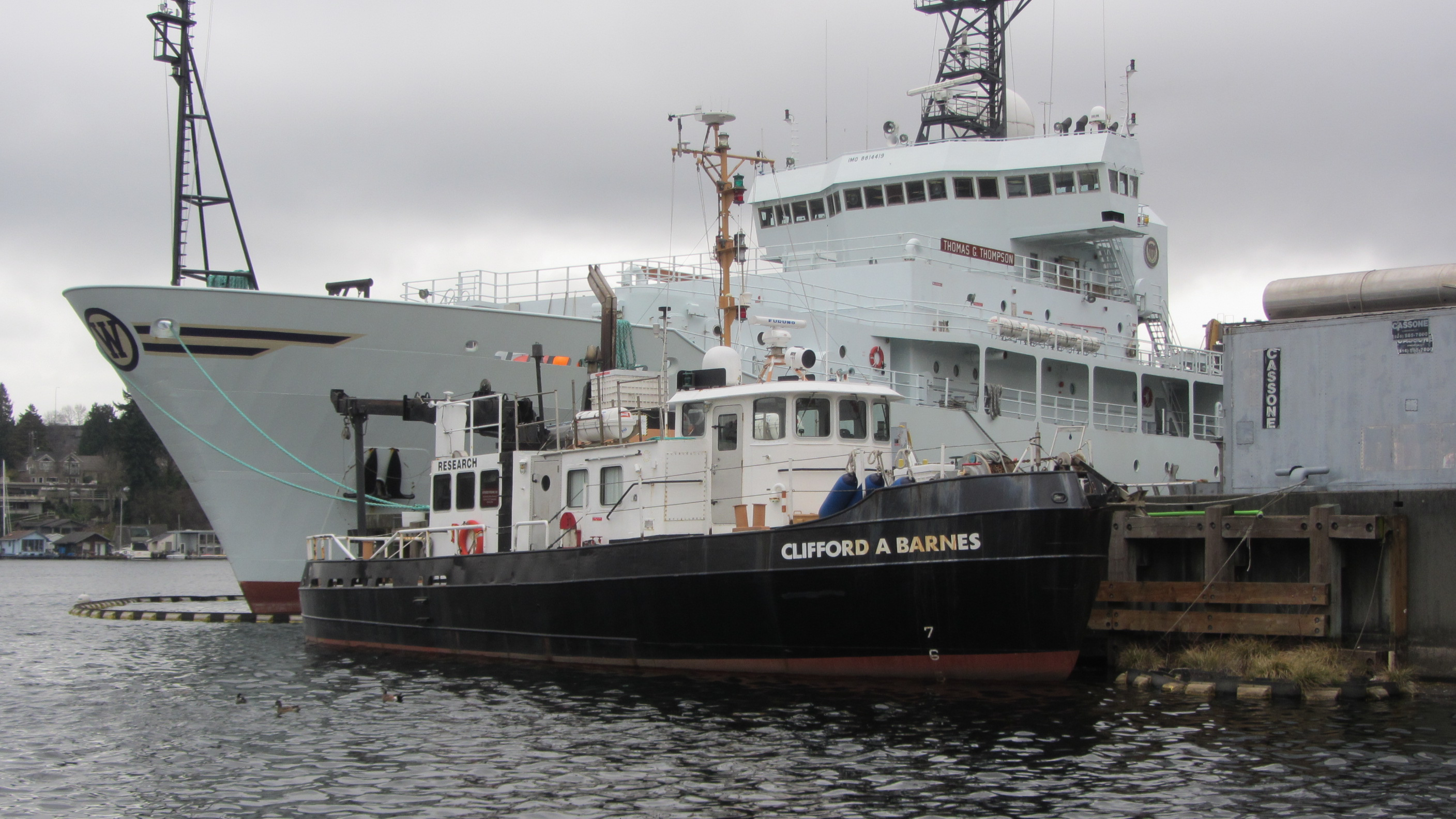
- RV Clifford A. Barnes at its home port

History

United States
- Name: RV Clifford A. Barnes
- Namesake: Clifford A. Barnes
- Owner: National Science Foundation
- Operator: University of Washington
- Ordered: 1964
- Awarded: 1964
- Builder: Western Boat, Tacoma, Washington
- Laid down: 1965
- Completed: 1966
- Acquired: from the U. S. Coast Guard, 1983, as USCGC Bitt
- Commissioned: 1966
- Recommissioned: 1983 as R/V Clifford A. Barnes
- Decommissioned: 2018
- In service: 1983-2018
- Out of service: 2019
- Renamed: M/V Bitt
- Reclassified: Leased to University of Washington, School of Oceanography, 1995
- Refit: 1983
- Home port: School of Oceanography Pier, Portage Bay
- Identification: MMSI number: 366918910; Callsign: WRN5495
- Fate: Sold at auction
- Status: Active as M/V Bitt

General characteristics
- Class & type: WYTL
- Tonnage: 86 displacement tons
- Length: 65 ft 5.5 in (19.95 m)
- Beam: 19 ft 7.5 in (5.98 m)
- Propulsion: CAT D379 550 HP
- Speed: 10 knots
- Range: 1900 nautical miles
- Endurance: 7 days
- Complement: 8, including 6 scientific party
- Crew: 2

RV Clifford A. Barnes was a research vessel that was owned by the National Science Foundation and operated as part of the University-National Oceanographic Laboratory System fleet. The University of Washington School of Oceanography operated the vessel under a charter-party agreement.

== History ==
Clifford A. Barnes began service as a United States Coast Guard icebreaking small harbor tug, USCGC Bitt. Built by Western Boat Building Co in 1965 for ice operations, search and rescue, and pollution response, she was one of fifteen of her class ordered by the Coast Guard. She was decommissioned in 1982 and turned over to the National Science Foundation, although ships of her class remain in service by the USCG.

== Research vessel mission ==
The University of Washington School of Oceanography uses Barnes for oceanographic and fishery research in the protected littoral waters of Washington and British Columbia. The vessel serves as platform for research on the fjord system of Puget Sound and the surrounding bodies of water. She supports research best done in sheltered bodies of water, and on the effects of populated areas on coastal areas. Barnes has a small science space, two winches, a crane, and can house up to six scientists and students. Cruises are generally only one day in length, although they sometimes run as long as six days. The university's use of Barnes is supported through a combination of grants and contracts, the university's operating funds, and self-sustaining revenue. In early May 2013 the Clifford A. Barnes sailed on its 1,000th cruise.

== Community outreach ==
An important non-research function of Clifford A. Barnes is to serve as a vehicle for community outreach. The main purpose of this outreach is to educate students about the marine sciences. This is primarily done through a two-day open house for local students grades 3–12. Faculty, crew, and students give tours of the ship, as well as demonstrations of marine research.

== Replacement ==
Although an October 2011 National Science Foundation inspection revealed that Barnes was still in generally good condition, its limited scientific and berthing capacity prompted the University of Washington to look for a replacement. Although the replacement ship would still operate primarily in and around Puget Sound, Jensen Maritime Consultants were commissioned to draw up plans for a vessel that will feature faster cruising speed, extended range, and increased berthing, among other improvements. However, the National Science Foundation recommended that RV Clifford A. Barnes stay in service through 2016.

The RV Clifford A. Barnes was eventually retired and replaced by the RV Rachel Carson in 2018.
