= Olaf von Ramm =

Canadian medical researcher

Olaf von Ramm is the Thomas Lord Professor of Engineering at Duke University. He is best known for his work in the development of medical instruments, particularly ultrasound systems. He holds the first patent on a three-dimensional ultrasound .

Von Ramm grew up in Canada.

Von Ramm received his Bachelor of Science degree from the University of Toronto in 1968, and his Master of Science degree from the same institution in 1970. He received his doctorate from Duke, where he has spent his entire career.

Von Ramm was a Canadian National Research Scholar, and won the Terrence Matzuk Memorial Award and the Netherlands Heart Foundation Distinguished Lecture Award.
