= Miss Nightingale =

- The Musical
- Promotional art for 2018 production
- Music: Matthew Bugg
- Lyrics: Matthew Bugg
- Book: Matthew Bugg
- Setting: London, 1942
- Premiere: January 20, 2011: The Lowry, Salford, Greater Manchester, UK
- Productions: 2011 Salford premiere; 2011 London premiere; 2013 UK Tour; 2014 UK Tour; 2015 UK Tour; 2016 UK Tour; 2017 London revival; 2018 West End premiere

Miss Nightingale - The Musical is a British cabaret musical, telling the story of a love triangle between singing star Maggie, her composer George, and their producer Frank. Set in a London nightclub during the Second World War, the show contains elements of bawdy comedy alongside the central romantic drama, and explores both the female and homosexual experience against the backdrop of fascism.

Miss Nightingale was conceived and produced by Matthew Bugg, who wrote the libretto and the score. The piece was first presented at The Lowry, Greater Manchester and the King's Head Theatre, London in 2011. The West End premiere took place at the Hippodrome Theatre in 2018.

== Plot ==
West End version:
London, 1942. Maggie Brown is a Northern nurse who has moved to the capital to pursue her dream of becoming a singer. Her best friend and songwriter George Nowodny, a Jewish refugee from Nazi-occupied Berlin whom she met through her late brother Bill, lives with her in an East End bedsit; she is unaware that George was once her brother's lover, and that he is turning to prostitution to make ends meet. Maggie's boyfriend, Tom, a "wide boy," acts as her agent and sets up an audition at a new nightclub owned by Sir Frank Worthington-Blythe, a wealthy socialite who was invalided out of the RAF after being awarded for bravery. Impressed by Maggie's voice and George's satirical songs, Frank books the pair and turns Maggie into London's brightest new star, "Miss Nightingale." As the act's success grows, the three decide they no longer need Tom, but Frank does not realise that Tom has discovered his secret love affair with George, and is threatening blackmail. Deeply closeted at a time when homosexuality was illegal, Frank will do almost anything to avoid discovery.

== Songs ==
West End version:

Act I:

- Cruising — George, Frank
- Let Me Play On Your Pipe — Maggie
- Happily Ever After — Maggie, George
- Meine Liebe Berlin — George
- The Only Girl For Me — Tom, Maggie
- Mr Follow Spot — Maggie, company
- Mister Nightingale — Frank
- The Pussy Song — Maggie, company
- I'll Sing For No One But Myself — George
- The Understudy — Maggie, George, Frank

Act II:

- We Can Do It — Maggie
- Could It Be — Maggie, George, Frank
- Stand Up And Be Counted — Maggie, company
- Bluebird — Maggie
- The Sausage Song — Maggie, company
- This Man of Mine — Maggie, George, Frank
- I Do — Maggie
- Someone Else's Song — Frank, Maggie, George

== Productions ==
A chamber version of the musical premiered at The Lowry Studio in Salford, Greater Manchester in January 2011, directed and choreographed by Bugg, starring burlesque performer Amber Topaz in the title role. The production then transferred to the King's Head Theatre, London for four weeks.

A full-scale re-worked version of the musical toured the UK for three months in 2013, directed by Peter Rowe and again headlined by Topaz. The following year a second tour was mounted, starring Jill Cardo and a cast of actor-musicians. The 2015 and 2016 tours were directed by Karen Simpson, with Clara Darcy in the title role. With every new production of the show, Bugg made changes to characters and songs.

In March 2017 the show returned to London for a two-month season at VAULT Festival, Waterloo, directed by Bugg and starring Tamar Broadbent. The following year it transferred to the West End, playing at The Hippodrome Casino from March 2018 with Lauren Chinery in the role.

== Cast ==
Role	Original production	London revival	West End
Role	2011	2017	2018
Maggie (Miss Nightingale)	Amber Topaz	Tamar Broadbent	Lauren Chinery
George	Ilan Goodman	Conor O'Kane	Matthew Floyd Jones
Frank	Richard Shelton	Nicholas Coutu-Langmead	Oliver Mawdsley

== Reception ==
Reviews of the 2011 premiere identified the musical's score as its chief attraction, but criticised other aspects of the production, in particular a libretto that "leaves a lot to be desired." Reviews for the reworked versions of the musical were more positive, continuing to praise the "wonderful" songs alongside the entertaining humour of the script, and by 2015, Miss Nightingale was "one of the most successful new UK touring musicals of the last decade."

Miss Nightingale was voted into 80th place in BritishTheatre.com's "100 Greatest Musicals of All Time" in 2016. The website's editor-in-chief wrote: "One of the great things that happen when you open a vote like this to the public is that you find out about a musical like Miss Nightingale." Readers of The Guardian also included Miss Nightingale in their "Favourite stage shows of 2016" for performances at the Theatre Royal, Margate, describing the show as a "touching tale, beautifully and originally told."
