= James Nightingale (English footballer) =

English footballer

Personal information
- Place of birth: England
- Position: Forward

Senior career*
| Years | Team | Apps | (Gls) |
| 1891–1892 | Darwen | 18 | (2) |
- * Club domestic league appearances and goals

James Nightingale was an English footballer who played in the Football League for Darwen.
