= Wreden =

Wreden is a surname. Notable people with the surname include:

- Davey Wreden (born 1988), American game developer and designer
- Douglas Wreden (born 1991), American Twitch streamer and internet personality
- Roman Wreden (1867–1934), Russian physician
