= Lemonade stand (disambiguation) =

Lemonade stand may refer to:

- Lemonade stand, a business that is commonly owned and operated by a child or children, to sell lemonade
- Lemonade Stand, a computer game used to teach basic business, math, and computer skills
- Lemonade Stand, a 2011 album by Illinois (band)
- Lemonade Stand (podcast), a business and news podcast launched in 2025

== See also ==
- Alex's Lemonade Stand Foundation
