= Wanderstop =

2025 video game

- Key art of Alta and shopkeeper Boro sitting on a bench
- Developer: Ivy Road
- Publisher: Annapurna Interactive
- Director: Davey Wreden
- Producer: Patrick McDermott
- Designer: Steven Margolin
- Programmer: Andrew Nguyen
- Artists: Nat F; Temitope Olujobi
- Writers: Davey Wreden; Karla Zimonja
- Composer: C418
- Engine: Unreal Engine
- Platforms: PlayStation 5; Windows; Xbox Series X/S; Nintendo Switch; Nintendo Switch 2
- Release: PS5, Win, XSX/S; March 11, 2025; Switch, Switch 2; June 23, 2026
- Genre: Cozy game
- Mode: Single-player

Wanderstop is a 2025 cozy game developed by Ivy Road and published by Annapurna Interactive. Written and directed by Davey Wreden, composed by C418, and edited by Karla Zimonja, it follows a former warrior named Alta, whose painful losses in combat have led her to help tend a tea shop with its owner, Boro, with an aim to heal herself. The gameplay includes a system of tea brewing and farming by planting seeds in a hex grid, creating more seeds and fruit for use in the tea, as the shop and its customers are attended to throughout the narrative.

After C418 and Wreden each had ideas for a video game by 2015, conceptualization began in 2016, and bona fide development on the game began around 2018. With work on the project lasting over nine years, it was completed in Unreal Engine and utilized the Blueprints visual scripting software for no-code development. Though Wreden's vision was originally only to make a cozy game, Wanderstop's focus shifted to the subject of trauma when Zimonja joined development, and Wreden chose to integrate his feeling of burnout from developing The Stanley Parable and The Beginner's Guide into the narrative. The art design, taking inspiration from other cozy games, draws elements of Impressionist art and Art Nouveau. C418's original score plays dynamically according to the player's actions.

Wanderstop was released on March 11, 2025 for PlayStation 5, Windows, and Xbox Series X/S. The game was praised for its characters, art and world design, narrative, and music, while the gameplay received a more divisive response. It appeared on several year-end best lists for 2025, and received nominations for accolades at the Golden Joystick Awards and the Game Awards 2025. Wreden was unsure about his future in game development after the release of Wanderstop, while C418 was open to further work with Ivy Road on a new game. Though the studio had plans for a game titled Engine Angel, Ivy Road announced that they would shut down on March 31, 2026 due to a lack of funding.

== Gameplay and premise ==
The game's protagonist, Alta, was once an undefeated fighter who spent her entire life training in her craft. Unable to recover from two recent defeats, she seeks the legendary fighter Master Winters to train her, but collapses in a forest. Getting nowhere by continuing to try and push on, Alta is invited to stay and work around the Wanderstop tea shop by its jovial owner Boro, as she attempts to "fix" what is wrong with her.

Wanderstop's cast of characters have stories which play out in multi-step quests. Boro speaks idiosyncratically and is easygoing. The customers include a man named Gerald, who is under a witch's curse that controls his limbs and pretends to be a knight in order to impress his son, who is aware of his silliness; a demon hunter who is left without demons to hunt and instead tries to aid communities through social work; and Nana, an old lady who sets up shop in Wanderstop's clearing, considering everyone a business competitor.

A central gameplay mechanic in Wanderstop is tea making. Alta collects tea leaves in a basket from bushes outside the shop, leaving them in a bowl to dry and turn into a tea ball. The tea balls are an ingredient used in a complex tea brewing contraption, which is of a size that requires the use of a ladder to access all of its components. Pulling a rope fills the flask with water, hitting the bellows causes the water to boil, and after kicking a valve, Alta throws in the tea ball and any other ingredients into the infuser. After this process is completed, the tea is transferred to the "pouramid", which fills cups with the finished tea. Customers may ask for a drink providing a desired effect, which different fruits will produce; a field guide can be consulted to attain knowledge of the proper one. Wanderstop's farming system is based on patterns on a hex grid. Seeds planted in rows of three become seed-producing "small hybrids", while planting seeds in a triangular pattern grows a fruit-producing "large hybrid". Different seed combinations produce different types of fruits.

Alta can roam the grounds to trim weeds, water plants, and sweep leaves to find decorative items or dirty teacups. She can return lost items via mail or frame photos on walls. Alta can brew tea for herself and drink it while sitting on a bench; using different fruits in the brew causes Alta to elicit and ponder different memories. Penguin-like "pluffins" roam the clearing, and they may steal items left around unattended. The mechanics of Wanderstop are designed to not cause stress; customers will wait for as long as it takes you to prepare the tea, botching a drink does not result in punishment but rather the opportunity to try again, and the activities have guides to help the player figure them out. The story progresses in chapters, which each have different moods and change the clearing to different colors.

== Development ==
=== Background ===
The game designer Davey Wreden released the full edition of his game, The Stanley Parable, in October 2013. Wreden struggled with the game's wide success; six months after release, Wreden began therapy, and took several months of drawing lessons, where he sketched woodland scenes. As early as 2015, composer and sound designer Daniel Rosenfeld, known by his pseudonym C418, had considered creating a video game. He described several experimental concepts, anticipating development would take time. C418 said he was open to collaborating with others on the ideas. At the same time, Wreden had just released his video game The Beginner's Guide, but had been working for so long he found himself unable to write. In January 2016, he had begun to daydream of going to a tea shop in the woods and lying on a bench by the water, and after sketching variations of the scene, decided that image would become the basis of his next game. Conceptualization for the project began that year.

In a 2018 interview with Bandcamp, C418 disclosed that he was working on a game with Wreden. He called it a "crazy experiment on making a game where you don't 'earn' anything and there are no numbers that go up", while the player could still "obsess" over it if they wished. He remarked that there was much room to experiment with audio in the game and that he wished to spend "a while" working on it. C418 explained that of all possible choices, composing for a smaller video game drew his attention most because of the "moxie" of developers in the scene, who often take on many roles during development—he said he always enjoyed the "spitballing environment". In July 2019, Wreden began hiring for a gameplay programmer working on tea-related implements and a systems engineer for his next game. In 2020, C418 said that he would serve as the "lead audio person" for a video game development studio based in Austin, Texas helmed by Wreden. The musician said he was very involved in the game's development. Wreden said that the project had been worked on for nine years "in some capacity".

Bona fide development, which began in 2018, was led by a small team. Developed in Unreal Engine, the game made use of the engine's Blueprints software, a visual scripting programming language which allowed no-code development. Wreden joked that development "took so fucking long that 'cozy game' is now like a swear word"; at the beginning of development, Wreden says cozy games had not been as popular by the time of Wanderstop's release, and said that his goal with the game was to explore humanity and have a purposeful narrative, which he felt other games in the genre had not yet covered. Developers for the game include lead producer Patrick McDermott, lead designer Steven Margolin, lead programmer Andrew Nguyen, and 2D and 3D art designers Nat F and Temitope Olujobi, respectively.

=== Animation and art ===
Aura Triolo, who served as lead animator on the game, prioritized finding shortcuts to animate the characters with. When she began working on the game in 2019, she was the only animator employed by Ivy Road, though the animation team would grow to as many as four simultaneous people later on. She spent much of her early development on Wanderstop setting up animation technology to automatically handle many different situations, including character idle and active stances. She utilized procedural generation and inverse kinematics to apply universal animation sets across all characters, which would work for each despite them having different models. She called the earlier implementations "one of the simpler examples" of procedural generation present in the game.

Artist Temitope Olujobi said that the Blueprints software aided them in development—they are not knowledgeable in computer science—as they were able to create development tools which expedited the process of creating art. Olujobi researched other cozy games, My Time at Portia (2019), Stardew Valley (2016), and namely Alba: A Wildlife Adventure (2020) for inspiration on the art of cozy games. They cite Alba as influential on both the level design and the aesthetic, considering that since it takes place on a single world, the environment functions as a "main character". Olujobi used Impressionist art in the vegetation, which they felt was evocative of "feeling", and remarked that "you can almost feel" the environmental colors and the textural aspect. Olujobi said that utilizing the "decadent and indulgent" aspects of Art Nouveau—based on "natural forms" and nature—worked well in achieving intricacy in the environmental design of Wanderstop. Olujobi studied the sights of botanical gardens to inform how the game would look when Alta contemplates things with her tea.

=== Creative and gameplay design ===
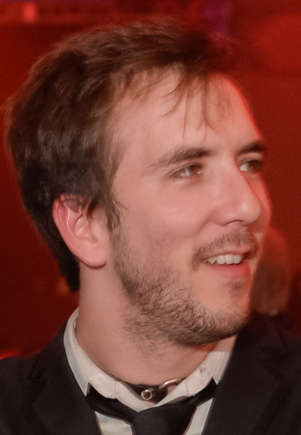
Wanderstop's writer-director Davey Wreden chose to integrate his feelings of burnout in the narrative.

After his struggle with burnout following the developments of his games The Stanley Parable (2013) and The Beginner's Guide (2015), Wreden wanted to create a cozy game, describing a wish to create "something simple and peaceful that could heal me and restore balance to my life", though this did not work for him, proving to still be stressful. Wreden did not find that the ideas of simply completing a list of tasks or just making a "cozy game" were satisfactory; it was only when Karla Zimonja joined development, a year and a half in, that Wreden realized they would make a game about trauma. Zimonja became Wreden's story editor, helping to provide direction to the narrative. Wreden watched two television series during the course of development, Better Call Saul (2015–2022) and BoJack Horseman (2014–2020), which influenced his writing because both are "deeply empathetic stories about troubled people in a difficult world just trying to do their best".

Wreden and Zimonja would take hours-long walks, figuring out characterization and personal details for Alta; Zimonja felt that Wreden's high personal standards for writing presented a welcome challenge—for example, the pair wrote Boro's dialogue carefully such that his motivational nature did not seem depthless. Zimonja spoke with women practitioners of jiu-jitsu to inform Alta's place as a fighter. Throughout development, Wreden decided slowly that he would integrate his feelings of being burnt out and hopeless into the game's narrative; Alta was originally a silent protagonist, meant to intentionally keep Wreden from writing large amounts of dialogue; before Wreden began having her reflectively voice his own fears and "belief that he could power through anything". Wreden said that he really "fucking hate[d]" guru tropes that see the wise characters chastise the subject character for being "wrong" and "dumb", and self-aggrandize about their wisdom and insight—Wreden was pleased that Boro was written to set an example for Alta to follow by just existing, without being the guru trope he hated. This dynamic was not enough to create the character of Boro, and Wreden had to build "a full person" around that main characteristic, one who would believably hold full conversations without being vague or abstract.

Wreden noted he had underestimated the complexity of a management game when he began the project. With the gameplay, Wreden originally had the tea making machine constitute one orb, but mandated expansion upon the number of orbs since it was the core gameplay element; following testing and feedback from the team, he ended at three—one to heat water, another for mixing ingredients, and a third for pouring the tea. Originally, Wreden wanted to utilise a system of procedural generation that made the game's garden grow alongside, and reflectively of the player, but Ivy Road could not make this work, and they replaced the procedural content with a structured experience. Wanderstop contains comedic fictional books written by "D.B. Steele". From the inception of the idea to have in-universe literature, Wreden knew the books had to be comedic, feeling that "totally optional and extremely lighthearted" material would contrast with player expectations for fictional books serving an expository purpose. A team meeting left Wreden with the idea to write these books in the style of Tom Clancy, disregarding other styles to focus on the "Dirk Warhard" content. Dirk Warhard was the name chosen for its "cool[ness]", and because Wreden shares initials with the name. Wreden felt that the comedy of these books contrasted with the "either dark or achingly sincere" tone of the other writing, a foil he felt necessary for himself and the player experience. A book studying the Dirk Warhard series exists in-game, titled Chasing Bullets: A History and Critical Theory of the Dirk Warhard Novels.

=== Music and sound design ===
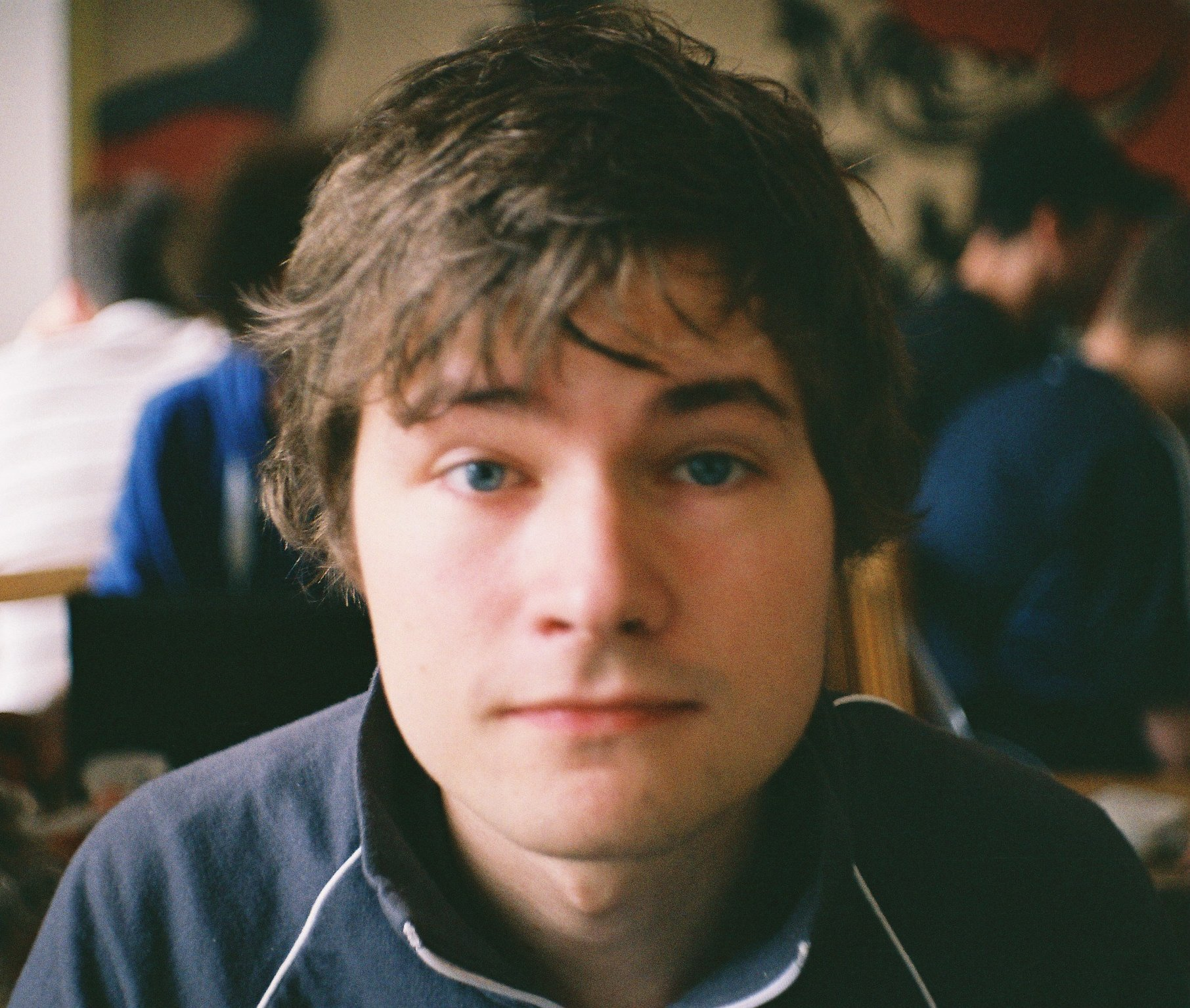
C418 composed the score for Wanderstop and served as sound designer.

Wanderstop's original soundtrack was composed by Ivy Road studio co-founder Daniel Rosenfeld, known professionally as C418. In the game, the music plays dynamically according to the player's actions; the composer crafted "shifts" in music between the peaceful clearing and the more boisterous tea shop. The tea shop's customers have unique themes, and the score changes in mood over time and with the game's story. The shop in Wanderstop has a radio with knobs that can be tuned to change the music it plays from several stations. C418 said his creative contribution came from "trauma more than anything", and described the collaborative process between himself, Wreden and Zimonja as each person attempting to be bold and converge their ideas together, and being "heart-to-heart" with one another when presenting concepts.

C418 also served as sound designer, and was directly involved in implementing the SFX into the game. He originally wished to solely compose but after consideration chose to become active in development—he considered taking an active role was "humbling" and "relaxing"— which made him feel like a normal developer after having built a reputation and high expectations of grandeur around his prior works. He described the audio engine as "too complex"; and remarked that the "talking" from the game's "pluffins" caused trouble for it. C418 said of developing "anything that had to do with audio": "putting the pen down is really, really hard, and stopping to smell the roses can be extremely difficult for me, especially as a person with ADHD"; he said that it was ironic that he would work without giving himself a break considering the central narrative concerned the subject of overworking.

C418 released three singles from the soundtrack of Wanderstop—the title track on December 11, 2024, the track "Endless Velocity" on February 19, 2025, and the track "Pumpkin" on March 4. C418 released the 89-song soundtrack album Wanderstop on March 11, 2025, a total of over 3 and a half hours of music, and released the 36-song album Wanderstop FM on April 8, constituting 2 hours and 10 minutes of material. 2 LP vinyl pressings, one for Wanderstop and another for Wanderstop FM, were announced in May 2026.

== Promotion and release ==
On July 29, 2021, C418, Wreden, and Zimonja revealed their game development studio Ivy Road, and announced a partnership with Annapurna Interactive. There, the company stated their intent to create a new video game with the company. Their publishing agreement was one of four announced at Annapurna's showcase that day; the others were with Outer Loop, No Code, and Canadian developer Jessica Mak. Studio co-founders Wreden, Zimonja, and C418 released an official announcement video with Annapurna in which the earlier two co-founders drank tea and joked about video games while Rosenfeld played an original piano piece in the background.

During the Summer Game Fest 2024 showcase in June, the game was officially announced as Wanderstop, for the PlayStation 5 and Windows, the latter via Steam. A trailer was revealed at the event, and the game was originally set to release later that year. In response to the trailer, PC Gamer's Lauren Morton remarked that the game "[has] exactly the kind of commentary we'd expect from Wreden as Wanderstop's director and writer", and GamesRadar+'s Hirun Cryer opined that Wanderstop "is The Stanley Parable creator's take on Stardew Valley". Inverse's Robin Bea felt that the game had the potential to explore the "real-world stresses that players are seeking to escape by playing them", and mused that the game could be seen as a parody of the cozy game genre. Game Informer's Kyle Hilliard anticipated a deeper meaning to the game given Wreden's previous work.

After the entire staff of the game's publisher Annapurna resigned in September due to failed negotiations with owner Megan Ellison, Wreden affirmed that the team at Ivy Road remained "100 percent okay", and that "Nothing's gonna stop us from getting Wanderstop out the door very soon" on an X post. C418 concurred, writing "We're fine and our game is doing just fine!" In October, the studio announced a delay to early 2025. On December 5, the studio announced the release date as March 11, 2025, with Wreden appearing as part of PC Gamer's PC Gaming Show to speak about his experiences throughout development. On December 11, music from C418's score featured in the Day of the Devs: The Game Awards Edition showcase.

Wanderstop was featured as part of the February 24, 2025 Annapurna Interactive showcase, where it was announced to additionally release on Xbox Series X/S, and when a demo for Steam Next Fest released. Brendan Caldwell at Rock Paper Shotgun and Kaan Serin at GamesRadar+ noted the demo, around half an hour long, served to establish the characters and narrative. Serin noted that the developers' prior works—Wreden's and Zimonja's previous games and C418's Minecraft score—have been lauded for their emotional value, and that the outward "storybook" and "adorable" presentation of Wanderstop contrasted with their collective repertoire; he commended the narrative depth that began to show throughout the demo. Caldwell similarly praised the volume of emotional content during the limited time.

Upon release of the game, Wreden made plans to take time off from game development. He said that he was unsure to what degree—if at all—he would be involved in Ivy Road's next game, and said he would be content with "freeing" himself "from the obligation and the expectation of churning out hit after hit". C418 said after Wanderstop, he anticipated working on another game with Ivy Road, desiring to continue with the same developers on a new concept. Though the studio had plans for a game titled Engine Angel, Ivy Road announced that they would shut down on March 31, 2026 due to a lack of funding. In April 2026, the publisher announced ports for Nintendo Switch and Nintendo Switch 2 for release on June 23, 2026. Physical editions for the PlayStation 5 and Nintendo Switch versions were announced in May 2026 for release on August 28, 2026.

== Reception ==
=== Critical response ===
Reception

Aggregate scores
Aggregator	Score
Metacritic	PC: 80/100; PS5: 79/100; XSX: 80/100
OpenCritic	84% recommend

Review scores
Publication	Score
Edge	6/10
Eurogamer	3/5
Game Informer	8/10
GamesRadar+	4/5
HobbyConsolas	75/100
IGN	9/10
PC Gamer (US)	84/100
Push Square	8/10
Shacknews	10/10
The Guardian	5/5
Inverse	9/10
Paste	8.1/10

Wanderstop received a positive critical response. (Note: According to:) Review aggregator Metacritic calculated weighted average scores of 80 out of 100 for Windows and Xbox Series X based on 43 and 4 critic reviews, respectively, and 79 out of 100 for PlayStation 5 from 21 critics, indicating "generally favorable" reviews. 84% of 76 critics recommended the game, according to OpenCritic. Wanderstop appeared on year-end best lists for 2025 compiled by The Guardian, The Standard, and Inverse.

The characters of Wanderstop were praised. Paste's Elijah Gonzalez called Boro "lovable", praising his nature as a guide and his wisdom mixed with "humility and humor"; the magazine praised two characters who served as mirrors to Alta. Digital Trends's Giovanni Colantonio wrote that Alta was relatable, opining her "brash nature and dry wit" made her the "perfect" barista, and praising the "fully fleshed out cast of characters" achieved by Alta's meaningful interactions with them. Eurogamer's Chris Tapsell wrote that Boro was lovely and constantly remained "pleasant, gentle-spirited and admirably kind", while Edge wrote that Boro was the "clear standout" of the game's supporting cast. GamesRadar+'s Miri Teixeira wrote the cast was "truly bizarre", Game Informer's Kyle Hilliard found them enjoyable, and PC Gamer's Christopher Livingston said they were charming. Game Rant's Carley Garcia said the characters were "curious" and "peculiar", and that Boro was adorable. Garcia wrote her "minor gripe" was that there should have been more voice acting, singling out Alta's voice actress as "stunning". Push Square's Stephen Tailby said they were charming, with "fantastic" dialogue. TheGamer's Tessa Kaur said the characters were wonderful, praising their humor and humanity, and Shacknews's Josh Broadwell said the customers were "wildly over-the-top" in personality, that Alta was sassy and disinterested, and that Boro was essentially Wanderstop's Gandalf.

Wanderstop's art and world design were received positively. The Guardian's Sarah Maria Griffin wrote the landscape was lovely and the gardens were "colourful and dangerously [Studio] Ghibli-esque", and CGMagazine's Eduard Gafton praised the "painterly" impressionist aesthetic, singling out the models in the game as impressive. Eurogamer's Tapsell wrote the world was "utterly charming", of a candy floss aesthetic, and TheGamer's Kaur wrote that the world was beautiful, adding that when each chapter of the game progressed, it was "wonderful" to see the colors of the trees and the environment change. Shacknews's Broadwell wrote the world was "idyllic" and "slightly psychedelic", and HobbyConsolas's Miguel Ángel Sánchez wrote the world was pleasant and welcoming, evoking the stylization of Tim Burton's works. Many reviewers were satisfied that the world and Alta's interactions with it were reset each chapter; while this meant a reset of all the player's modifications to the world save photographs hung on walls, they praised the mechanic as in line with the game's themes of impermanence and change.

The narrative of Wanderstop received critical praise. Paste's Gonzalez wrote that the game's exploration of recovering from "self-destructive tendencies" was a "constant highlight", praising the complexity of Alta's journey. Digital Trends's Colantonio credited Wreden for making the "introspective" story work, praising the sincerity with which the narrative was created, and calling the story a departure from the metanarratives of Wreden's previous games. GamesRadar+'s Teixeira wrote it was unsurprising that the narrative was done "beautifully" given Wreden and Zimonja's repertoire, praising their boldness in exploring the subject matter while not relying on the gameplay. Game Informer's Hilliard wrote it was accessible and engaging, and said Boro's easy attitude when addressing Alta made him "reexamine [his] emotional approach" to playing, which he considered impressive. Push Square's Tailby said the writing was the best part of Wanderstop, having a good balance between seriousness and "genuinely hilarious" comedy, while TheGamer's Kaur and The Guardian's Griffin said Wanderstop was a great example of the concept of ludonarrative "consonance" or "harmony", meaning the gameplay and story were matched well. Inverse's Robin Bea wrote that the game balanced the "harsh truth" that Alta could not solve every customer's problems—only help as much as she can, leaving them sometimes to their own—with humor that could leave the player "cackling". Edge questioned the game's contradictory nature, saying that while it asked the player to consider the value of having nothing to do, those who did not appreciate this would have the onus on them for not challenging their own "toxic productivity".

C418's score was praised for its emotional impact and versatility. IGN's Shailyn Cotten wrote they were "in for a musical treat" considering the Minecraft musician's involvement, finding that the unique character themes felt "deeply engrossing" and told stories of their own, and praising the score's changes from "comforting and idyllic" to "unnerving" as impressively precise. GamesRadar+'s Teixeira called the score "moving", and Digital Trends's Colantonio wrote its calming aspect "hits the mark". HobbyConsolas's Ángel Sánchez wrote that all of C418's talent was put to use, finding the nostalgia and melancholy his music evoked to be remarkable. Game Rant's Garcia said it was "lovely", and remarked it seemingly captures the "exact mood" of every moment, The Guardian's Griffin found it "pleasant and unobtrusive", and CGMagazine's Gafton wrote C418's piano was "bewitching" and his score was "masterful", similarly praising how the music matched Alta's mood during any given moment. TheGamer's Kaur noted that scrolling on the menu plays notes matching the theme song's melody, and said that this was their "absolute favorite detail" in the game.

Wanderstop's gameplay received a more divisive response. Paste's Gonzalez said the tea brewing mechanic became monotonous as the game progressed, and wished that the gameplay either had more depth or was "deemphasized altogether" in favor of narrative focus. Digital Trends's Colantonio said the tea making system was easy to follow yet more complex later on, though he said it was aiming to be a puzzle game, two concepts that clashed; Colantonio bemoaned that the game ended before the complexity of the system could be appreciated. GamesRadar+'s Teixeira wrote that the gameplay served as "actively therapeutic" rather than "mindless" as is typical of most cozy games. Game Rant's Garcia praised the gardening as satisfying, and said the tea making was excellent. Push Square's Tailby said the gameplay could feel tedious, but becomes easy and pressureless, and praised the freedom it allows the player to explore. PC Gamer's Livingston said the management system could have been enjoyable as a game by itself. Shacknews's Broadwell said "literally everything you do, even if it's just washing a teacup", stuck to the game's main ideas, and IGN's Cotten wrote that despite the simplicity of tea brewing, the movement was fun. Game Informer's Hilliard appreciated the concept of the gameplay, but derided the handling and execution; Edge felt the goal-oriented nature of the gameplay limited the story.

=== Accolades ===
List of awards and nominations for Wanderstop
Year	Awards	Category	Result	Ref.
2024	PC Gaming Show: Most Wanted	Most Wanted for 2025	9th Place	
2025	Golden Joystick Awards	Best Indie Game	Nominated	
2025	The Game Awards 2025	Games for Impact	Nominated	
