= Atrioc =

American internet personality (born 1991)

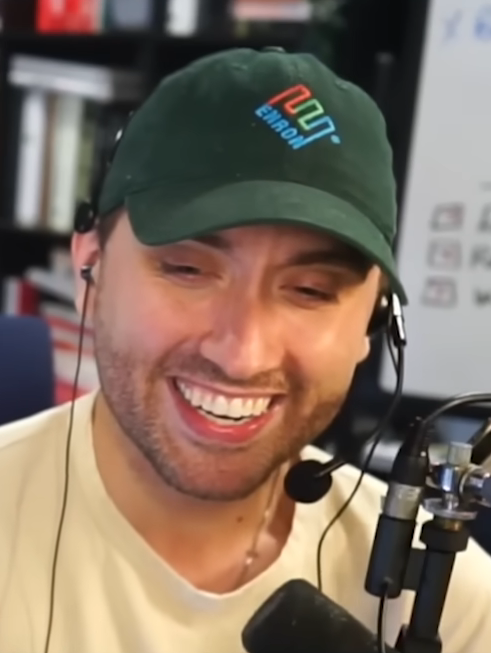
- Ewing in 2024
- Born: Brandon Ewing; April 19, 1991 (age 35); Glendale, Arizona, U.S.
- Education: Arizona State University (BS)
- Occupations: Twitch streamer; YouTuber
- Spouse: Arianna Ewing (m. 2022)

Twitch information
- Channel: Atrioc
- Years active: 2019–present
- Followers: 442 thousand

YouTube information
- Channels: Atrioc; Big A
- Years active: 2020–present
- Genres: News; economics; politics; marketing; gaming
- Subscribers: 939 thousand (Atrioc); 533 thousand (Big A)
- Views: 409.69 million (Atrioc); 455.56 million (Big A)
- Last updated: 8 October, 2026

Brandon Ewing (born April 19, 1991), better known as Atrioc, is an American content creator and online streamer, known for his gaming videos as well as his economic and political coverage. Since 2025, he has been a cohost of the Lemonade Stand podcast.

Born in Glendale, Arizona, Ewing began streaming gaming content in late 2019 while working as a marketer at Nvidia. In 2020, he began an ongoing news series on his live streams called Marketing Monday, where he uses his prior work experience to break down contemporary topics related to marketing and business to his audience. Ewing gained prominence for his content surrounding the Hitman video game franchise, in which he previously held a world record for speedrunning. In 2022, Ewing became a full-time streamer.

In January 2023, Ewing was the subject of a controversy after he accidentally revealed a browser tab that contained a website selling deepfake pornography of female streamers during a live stream. He subsequently issued a public apology and took a hiatus from streaming. Ewing later made efforts to combat the spread of deepfake pornography by funding legal services and working with companies that could issue takedown notices to websites hosting deepfaked content.

== Early life and career ==
Brandon Ewing was born on April 19, 1991 at Luke Air Force Base in Maricopa County, Arizona. The son of a service member, Ewing moved frequently throughout his childhood and lived in several countries. Ewing attended Arizona State University, where he founded the school's Esports association. While at college, Ewing became an avid League of Legends player. In 2013, he graduated with a Bachelor of Science in marketing.

In 2014, Ewing began working at Twitch in content marketing. During his tenure, Ewing co-hosted Twitch Weekly, a weekly live show that covered news and events pertaining to the platform. In December 2017, Ewing left his position to work under global consumer marketing at Nvidia. Ewing appeared in various videos for the company, including its launch event for the GeForce RTX 30 series GPUs.

== Online career ==
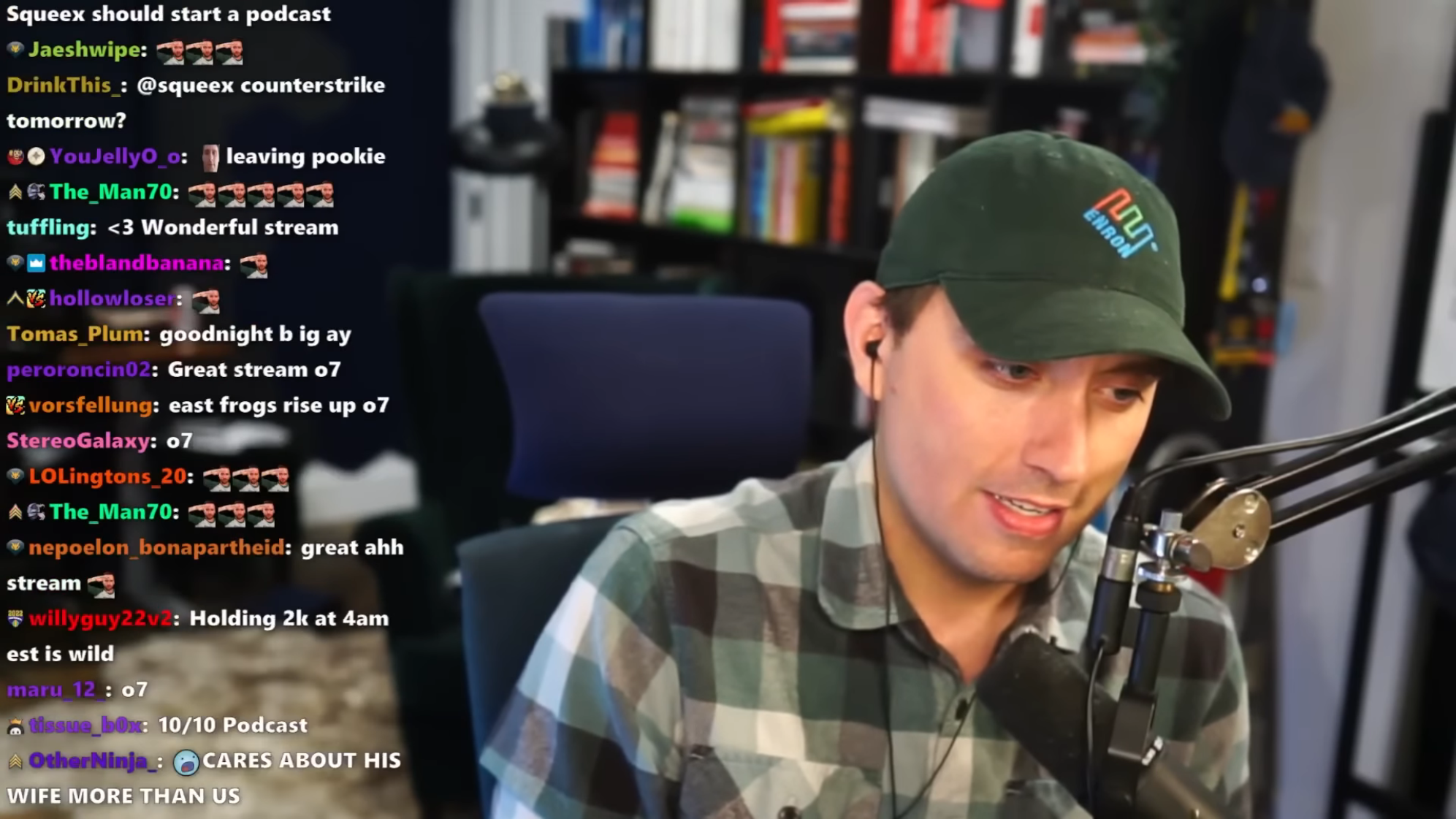
Screenshot from an Atrioc livestream in 2024

Ewing began streaming consistently at the start of the COVID-19 pandemic. During his first few years of streaming, he remained a fulltime employee at Nvidia, before joining Offbrand and becoming a fulltime streamer in late 2022.

Since 2020, Ewing has hosted Marketing Monday, a live news series covering the latest developments in marketing, business, and politics. In 2023, Ewing began posting daily clips from his live streams to his second channel, Big A. These segments typically consist of contemporary economic and political coverage.

Ewing plays a variety of games on his streams, including the Hitman series. He is also active in the franchise's speedrunning scene. In 2023, he organized a Hitman 2 speedrunning challenge, where competitors who came in first, second, and third place would receive $500, $200, and $100 respectively.

In 2021, Ewing unintentionally leaked private conversations between Valkyrae and Ludwig about contract issues. In September 2022, Ewing founded the content creation agency Offbrand with Ludwig Ahgren, Nathan Stanz, and Nick Allen. On September 25, 2025, Ewing appeared on the This is Gavin Newsom podcast, where he discussed economic nihilism, online communities, and gaming culture with California governor Gavin Newsom.

=== Deepfake controversy ===
During a live stream in January 2023, Ewing accidentally revealed a browser tab which contained a pornographic website selling explicit deepfaked material of female streamers, including Pokimane, QTCinderella, Sweet Anita, and Maya Higa. In response to the controversy, Ewing admitted to paying for access to the website and apologized to the streamers affected. QTCinderella, who had been a close friend of Ewing prior to the controversy, indicated she terminated her friendship with him following the incident. Ewing subsequently stepped away from his position at Offbrand and took a hiatus from streaming.

Following this, Ewing worked with QTCinderella and wired $60,000 to a law firm to cover the legal fees of women seeking to issue takedown notices to websites hosting deepfaked content. Ewing has also worked with Ceartas, an AI-powered platform which helps automatically delist websites and issue takedown notices faster than traditional means.

== Other ventures ==
=== Lemonade Stand podcast ===
In March 2025, Ewing launched a business podcast called Lemonade Stand with fellow content creators DougDoug and Aiden McCaig. In June, former chair of the Federal Trade Commission Lina Khan appeared on the podcast for an interview. On October 8, 2025, Vox Media announced that it had entered a partnership with the podcast.

=== Get To Work ===
In 2023, Ewing began working with independent video game developer Isto Inc. to create Get To Work, a satirical platform game about climbing the corporate ladder. The game was released on December 2, 2024 for Windows and Xbox Series X/S. Ewing served as voice talent in the game and assisted with its story and marketing.

== Personal life ==
Ewing married his longtime girlfriend Arianna in August 2022. They moved to Los Angeles together in late 2022, after Ewing left his position at Nvidia in San Jose, California.

== Awards and nominations ==
Ceremony	Year	Category	Result	Ref.
The Streamer Awards	2021	Best Speedrunner	Nominated	
