= Cara Ellison =

Scottish video game critic and developer (born 1985)

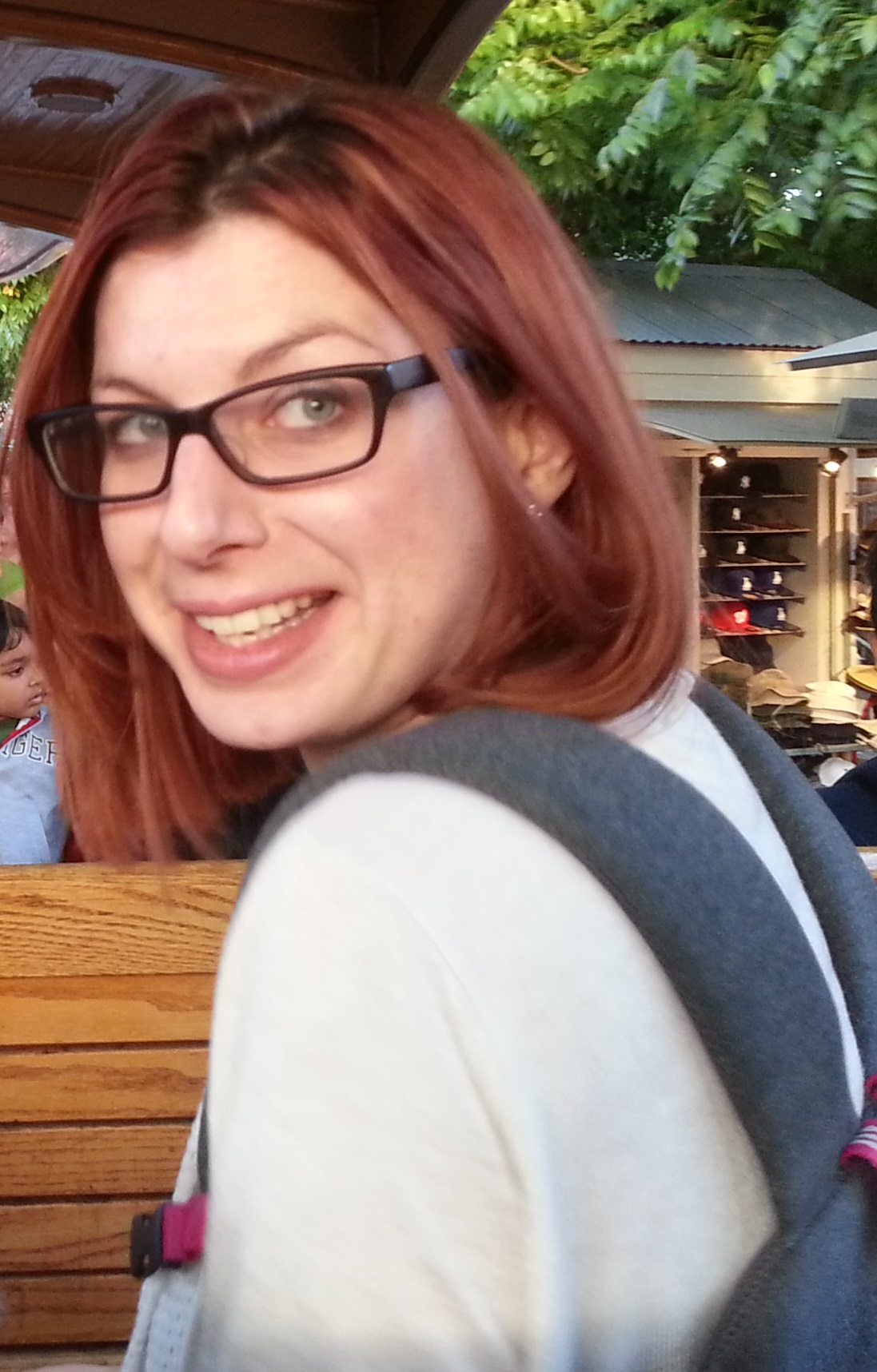
- Ellison in 2014
- Born: 28 September 1985 (age 41)
- Occupations: Critic, developer

Cara Ellison (born 28 September 1985) is a Scottish video game writer and critic.

== Journalism ==
Ellison made regular contributions to publications PC Gamer, Unwinnable and Rock Paper Shotgun beginning in 2012.

She has also written gaming related articles for New Statesman, Paste, Edge magazine and Kotaku and is a regular contributor to The Guardian games blog. From 2014 to 2015, Ellison wrote a bi-weekly column called S.EXE for Rock Paper Shotgun about the depiction of sex and romance in video games. She also contributed video game related articles to VICE UK in 2014.

In 2013, Ellison won the Games Media Award 'Rising Star' for her work writing about games, and The Guardian placed her number ten in the 'Top 30 Young People in Digital Media' list 2014.

In 2014, Ellison successfully sought funding on Patreon for her "Embed with" series, in which she became an itinerant games journalist, travelling the world and writing about the lives and processes of games developers.

From February 2021 to June 2022, Ellison co-hosted The Inspirational Quarterly with Davey Wreden, a podcast dedicated to reading, reviewing, and discussing Keith R. A. DeCandido's 2006 novel StarCraft: Ghost: Nova.

== Games development ==
Ellison worked for Rockstar North as a QA tester on Grand Theft Auto IV until 2008. In 2013, Ellison wrote the text-based interactive fiction game Sacrilege, which The New York Times described as a "raw exploration of female sexuality that also includes some astute observations about male desire". Ellison also has collaborated with artist Howard Hardiman on Badger's Day Out, funded by a combination of a successful Kickstarter, with backing from the Arts Council England.

She was contracted by Arkane Studios as an external narrative consultant for the 2016 title Dishonored 2.

In August 2015, she gave a keynote at Dare to Be Digital.

Ellison provided voice acting for the character of 'Peanut' in the 2015 game Assault Android Cactus.

She worked as the writer of Void Bastards.

She was a senior narrative designer for the Hardsuit Labs project Vampire: The Masquerade – Bloodlines 2 until she left the project following the departure of Brian Mitsoda and Ka'ai Cluney.

In June 2021, it was announced that she, alongside Brian Mitsoda, had joined The Fermi Paradox development team at Anomaly Games.

== Bibliography ==
- The State of Play: Creators and Critics on Video Game Culture (October 2015, Seven Stories Press)
- Embed with Games: A Year on the Couch with Game Developers (November 2015, Polygon)
