= Void Bastards =

2019 video game

- Developer: Blue Manchu
- Publisher: Humble Bundle
- Designer: Jonathan Chey
- Programmer: Farbs
- Writer: Cara Ellison
- Composer: Ryan Roth
- Engine: Unity
- Platforms: Windows; Xbox One; Nintendo Switch; PlayStation 4
- Release: Windows, Xbox One: WW: May 28, 2019; Switch, PS4: WW: May 7, 2020
- Genres: First-person shooter, roguelite
- Mode: Single-player

Void Bastards is a science-fiction first-person shooter and roguelike video game developed by Blue Manchu and published by Humble Bundle. It was released on May 28, 2019, for Microsoft Windows and Xbox One. Ports of the game for Nintendo Switch and PlayStation 4 were released on May 7, 2020. The game revolves around surviving in the dangerous Sargasso Nebula by boarding and salvaging materials from spaceships. It received generally positive reviews from critics, who praised its comic-book art style, dark humor, and gameplay, but criticized its lackluster story and replay value.

== Plot ==
The main character is one of many rehydrated prisoners aboard a stranded personnel vessel, whose AI must rely on its dangerous cargo to obtain fuel for a final jump to its destination.

== Gameplay ==
The game revolves around a procedurally generated structure, in which the player enters other ships, fights enemies and salvages materials to repair their own ship. If the player dies, they are replaced by another "rehydrated" prisoner, losing all ammunition, fuel, and food, but keeping weapon and gadget upgrades as well as objective progress. The game has been described as an immersive sim.

== Development ==
Developed by Australian studio Blue Manchu, the game was inspired by System Shock 2 and BioShock.

=== Legacy ===
A spiritual sequel, Wild Bastards, was released in September 2024 for PlayStation 5, Steam, and Xbox Series X and S. It received generally positive reviews from critics.

== Reception ==
Reception

Aggregate score
Aggregator	Score
Metacritic	PC: 81/100; XONE: 75/100; NS: 78/100

Review scores
Publication	Score
Destructoid	7/10
Game Informer	8/10
GameRevolution	9/10
GameSpot	8/10
Nintendo Life	8/10
Nintendo World Report	8/10
PC Gamer (US)	71/100
Shacknews	8/10

Void Bastards received "generally favorable reviews" according to Metacritic. Cosmin Vasile of Softpedia rated the game 8.5/10, calling it an "absolute delight" due to its comic-book aesthetics and "solid", "addictive" gameplay, but also noting it was "repetitive" with a "weak story". Alessandro Barbossa of GameSpot rated the game 8/10, also praising the art style and "ridiculously designed" but "satisfying" weapons. Samuel Roberts of PC Gamer rated it 71/100, calling the game "slightly messy" but praising its "gorgeous" art style and "excellent" weapons.

=== Accolades ===
The game was nominated for "Xbox Game of the Year" at the 2019 Golden Joystick Awards, and for "Excellence in Visual Art" at the Independent Games Festival Awards.
