= Wild Bastards =

2024 video game

- Developer: Blue Manchu
- Publisher: Maximum Entertainment
- Engine: Unity
- Platforms: Windows; Xbox One; Xbox Series X and S; PlayStation 4; PlayStation 5; Nintendo Switch
- Release: WW: September 12, 2024
- Genres: First-person shooter, roguelite
- Mode: Single-player

Wild Bastards is a science-fiction Wild West first-person shooter and roguelike video game developed by Blue Manchu and published by Maximum Entertainment. It was released on September 12, 2024, for Microsoft Windows, Xbox One, Xbox Series X and S, PlayStation 4, PlayStation 5, and Nintendo Switch. Wild Bastards received mixed to positive reviews from critics, praising its art style and design, but criticizing the gameplay loop as repetitive.

== Gameplay ==
Wild Bastards is a single-player roguelike first-person shooter featuring a full story campaign with multiple difficulties and modes. There are 13 playable characters (Outlaws), all members of the titular Wild Bastards. Outlaws have feuds and friendships, which affect who can team up and certain gameplay synergies.

It begins with the remaining 2 outlaws tasked with crossing the galaxy and resurrecting their fallen teammates. The player can warp to different sectors that feature randomized planets and anomalies. Players can choose a path through the sector and land on planets to gather mods, upgrades, and rescue playable characters. While on the planet, the player has a limited move set on a gameboard of encounters. Players must navigate and survive encounters while planning a path to get loot and escape on the Beam Station tile. If an outlaw dies on a planet, they must be healed with a tonic to become playable again.

== Development ==
Developed by Canberra, Australia based studio Blue Manchu, the Wild Bastards is a spiritual sequel to the studio's previous game Void Bastards. The game was announced in March 2024.

== Reception ==
Reception

Aggregate score
Aggregator	Score
Metacritic	PC: 76/100

Review scores
Publication	Score
GameSpot	9/10
PC Gamer (US)	91/100

Wild Bastards received "generally favorable" reviews from critics. PC Gamer favorably compared Wild Bastards to the Arkane Studios title Deathloop, saying Wild Bastards was "a successful splicing of the roguelike and FPS genres".

NintendoLife was far more critical. Although they found the cast of characters fun and amusing, they criticized the gunplay as "bland and simplistic" and said the game progresses to nothing challenging or satisfying. CheckpointGaming rated the title 7.5/10, praising the gunplay as experimental, fluid, and frenetic. They criticized the game length as "dragging".
