= Davey Wreden =

Video game developer (born 1988)

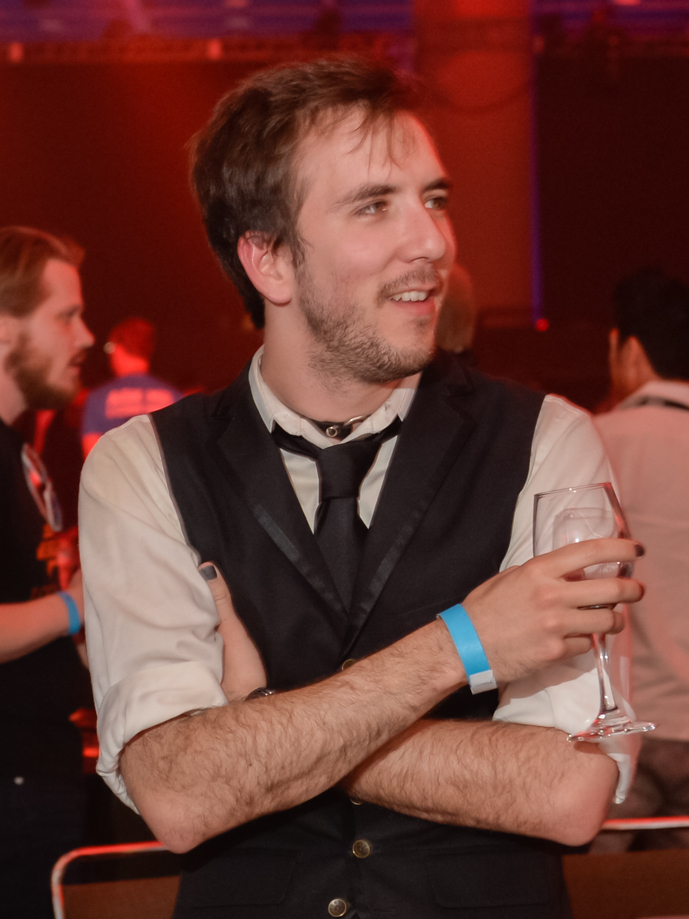
- Wreden at the Game Developers Choice Awards in 2016
- Born: September 29, 1988 (age 38)
- Education: University of Southern California (BA)
- Occupations: Game designer, developer
- Known for: The Stanley Parable; The Beginner's Guide; Co-founding Ivy Road
- Relatives: Douglas Wreden (brother)

Davey Wreden (born September 29, 1988) is an American game designer and developer, best known for his work on The Stanley Parable, The Beginner's Guide, and Wanderstop.

== Career ==
=== The Stanley Parable ===
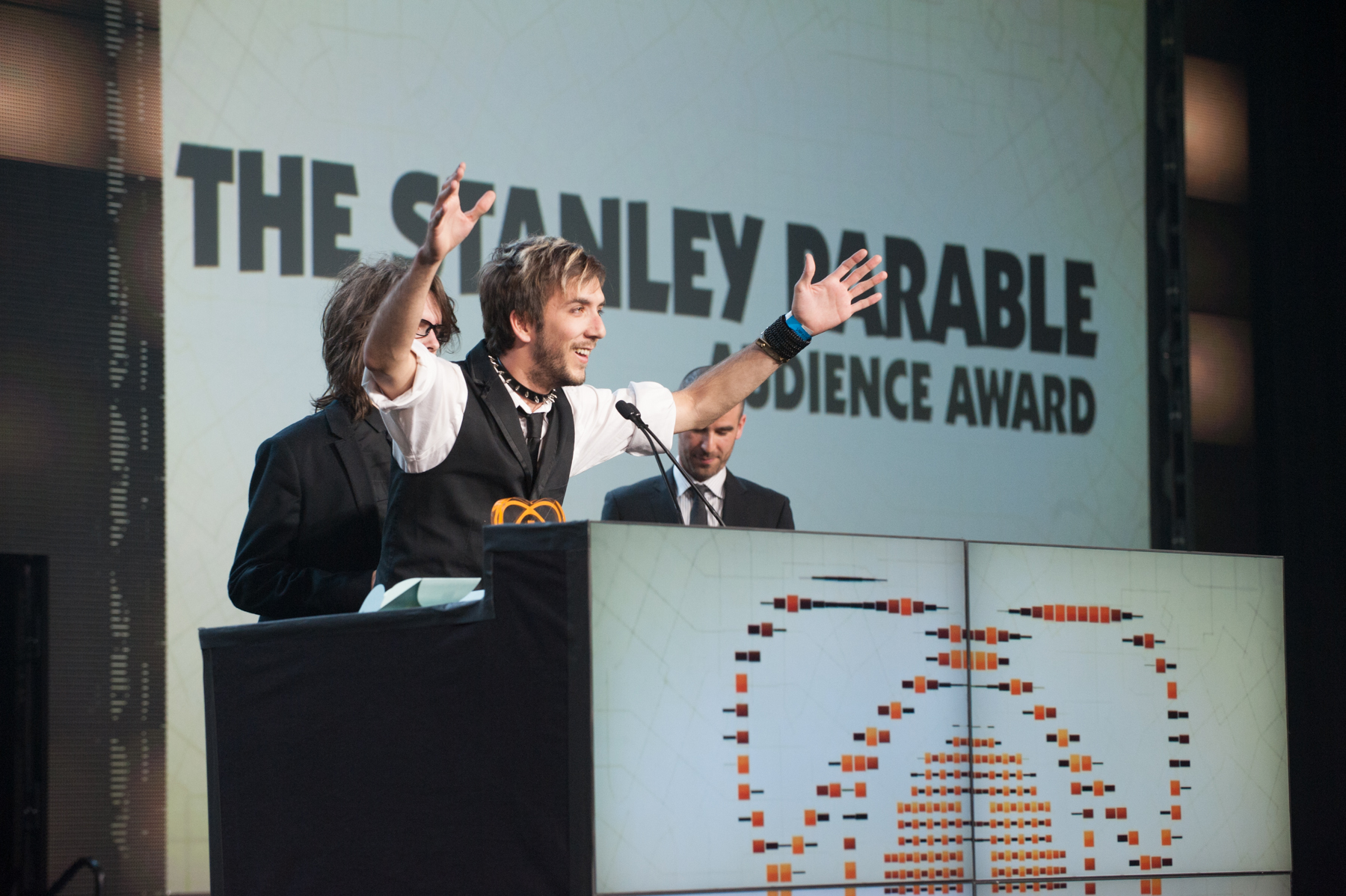
The Stanley Parable won the Audience Award at the Independent Games Festival Awards.

Wreden started developing video games in 2009. He created The Stanley Parable in 2011, as a modification for Valve Corporation's game Half-Life 2. The mod itself received attention for its approach to storytelling and use of the video game medium. In 2013, he remade and expanded it into a standalone title with co-developer William Pugh. The Stanley Parable received critical acclaim for its thought-provoking themes and innovative use of popular gameplay mechanics. The game explores the nature of player agency and challenges traditional game design conventions.

Wreden experienced depression after the success of The Stanley Parable, which included various media outlets' game of the year awards. He described responding to emails, both negative and positive. "In answering all that fan mail, Wreden says that he lost sight of the meaning in his answers, he lost sight of why he made The Stanley Parable in the first place." Wreden also drew a comic to help describe his feelings.

Dan Erickson, creator of the TV show Severance, said he partly took inspiration from The Stanley Parable. Jesper Juul finds ironic similarities between Wreden's experience and his following game, The Beginner's Guide. An expanded edition, entitled The Stanley Parable: Ultra Deluxe, was released in 2022.

=== The Beginner's Guide ===
In 2015, Wreden released The Beginner's Guide, a narrative-driven game that delves into the personal and creative struggles of a fictional game developer. Through a series of introspective and emotionally charged levels, the game raises questions about authorship, interpretation, and the relationship between creators and players. The Beginner's Guide was noted for its introspective storytelling. Davey Wreden, acting as narrator of The Beginner's Guide, became a character in the game as well.

Frank G. Bosman and Archibald L.H.M. van Wieringen write that the game's narrative ends up being largely about the Davey Wreden character, also describing the complex intertextual relationship between the character's narrative and other elements of the story. Alayna Cole and Dakoda Barker describe Wreden's approach to the narrative of the game; they suggest that the introduction, where he describes himself as the creator of The Stanley Parable and gives out his real email address, is meant to establish authenticity. Braxton Soderman believes the character Coda is also a stand-in for Wreden the game designer.

=== Itch.io and podcast ===
Wreden has also released free-to-play games on itch.io. This included a 2017 collaboration titled Absolutely: A True Crime Story, described by Kotaku as a "nihilistic parody". From February 2021 to June 2022, Wreden and Cara Ellison hosted The Inspirational Quarterly, a podcast dedicated to reading, reviewing, and discussing Keith R. A. DeCandido's 2006 novel StarCraft: Ghost: Nova.

=== Wanderstop ===
In 2021, Wreden founded the game studio Ivy Road along with Karla Zimonja and C418, with additional support from Annapurna Interactive. The studio released their first game, Wanderstop, a cozy game which integrates Wreden's feelings of burn out into the narrative, on March 11, 2025.

== Style and influences ==
Wreden has been influenced by cartoonist Alison Bechdel, author David Foster Wallace, and the games of Brendon Chung—including Gravity Bone and Thirty Flights of Loving. Soderman finds a change in themes between the lightheartedness of The Stanley Parable and the depression and alienation of The Beginner's Guide.

Discussing authorship and player agency in game design, Ivan Girina writes, "Davey Wreden's authorial discourse is often evoked as the focal point around which the meaning of not only Stanley but also his other creations, such as The Beginner's Guide ... is organised."

== Personal life ==
Wreden was born on September 29, 1988. He has previously resided in Austin, Texas but is currently located in Vancouver, British Columbia. Wreden attended the University of Southern California, graduating in 2011 with a degree in critical studies. He originally went to school to study film, but realized it was not what he wanted for his particular work and focused his attention on the gaming world instead, stating that "wasn't so interesting to me, but there's still so much space for games to grow." Wreden is the brother of Douglas Wreden (also known as DougDoug), a popular streamer and online content creator.
