= DougDoug =

American internet personality (born 1991)

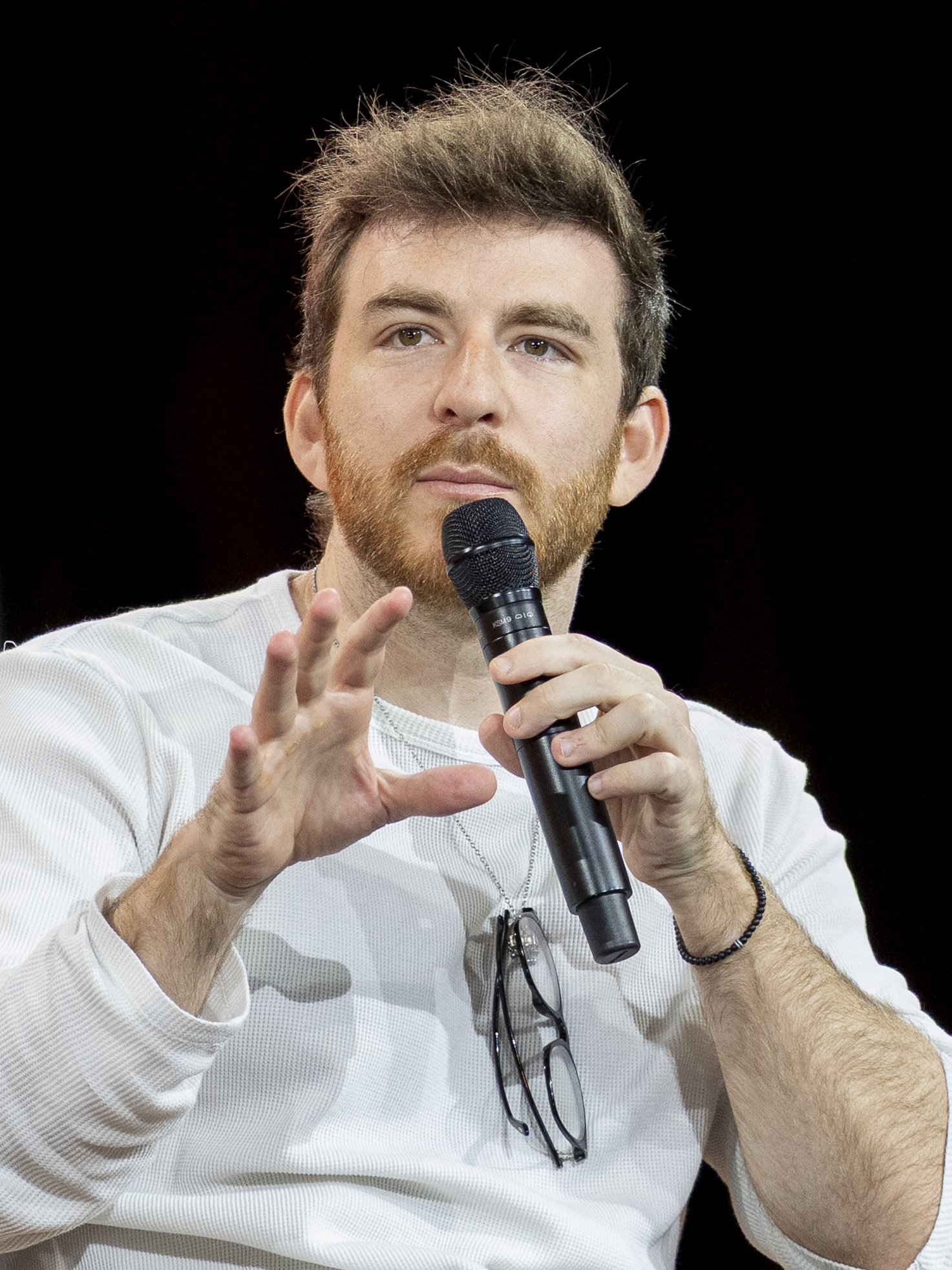
- Wreden in 2026
- Born: Douglas Scott Wreden; January 18, 1991 (age 35)
- Education: University of California, Berkeley
- Occupations: YouTuber; Twitch streamer; caster; producer; podcaster
- Relatives: Davey Wreden (brother)

Twitch information
- Channel: DougDoug
- Years active: 2018–present
- Genre: Gaming [Tech|AI]
- Games: Mario Maker, Peggle
- Followers: 1.2 million

YouTube information
- Channels: DougDoug; DougDougDoug; DougDoug Clips, DougDougDougDoug, Lemonade Stand, Friends till Death
- Years active: 2015–2025
- Genre: Gaming/Tech
- Subscribers: 3.15 million
- Views: 817 million
- Last updated: November 18, 2026
- Website: Official website

Douglas Scott Wreden (born January 18, 1991), better known as DougDoug (formerly Gloudas), is an American YouTuber, Twitch streamer, and podcaster. In his videos he does various gaming challenges, often involving the use of artificial intelligence, modifications to games, and giving his viewers on Twitch heavy control of the game or stream. He retired his main YouTube channel in late 2025, although he continues to post on his second channel, DougDougDoug, as well as on his clips channel, DougDoug Clips and continues to stream on Twitch.

In 2023, he won the "League of Their Own" award at The Streamer Awards, and in 2024, he was nominated for the "Best Software and Game Development" award. In 2025, Wreden began hosting the Lemonade Stand podcast with fellow content creators Brandon Ewing and Aiden McCaig, and released the book Doug: A DougDoug Story.

== Career ==
Wreden wearing a Waluigi cap in 2020

=== Esports ===
Wreden worked for Electronic Arts as a programmer before leaving to work on the Hearthstone Championship Tour, which was organized by ESL, under the online alias Gloudas. After ESL stopped producing the Championship Tour in 2017, he helped design the Hearthstone Trinity Series for ESL; he later described his role:

Right around [when ESL stopped producing the Championship Tour], ESL was in talks with Twitch to partner on an original Hearthstone team league, and since I had been helping lead ESL's Hearthstone team through 2016, I was approached internally to help design what this new team league would be. I definitely will not claim to be the sole creator of Trinity Series, as there were a number of super talented folks who helped iterate on the format and concept, but through a lot of discussion we landed on our core concept: eight teams of three players, with a Last Hero Standing nine-deck format, and team listen-ins throughout the matches.

— Wreden, 2018

After the Trinity Series design was finalized, Wreden produced the tournament and described his role as helping "coordinate all the show's elements on a high level". According to Wreden, the tournament's first season was positively received, and a second one was released.

Towards the end of the second Trinity Series season, Reynad – a colleague – convinced Wreden to join esports organization Tempo Storm; he later said he agreed with Reynad's emphasis on creativity and wanted a "change of pace" from ESL. In March 2018, he entered Hearthstone's "So you think you can cast?" competition, which searched for new Hearthstone casters. His audition was retweeted by Hearthstone director Ben Brode; Tim Clark, writing for PC Gamer, said that he was the "clear winner" and not selecting him would be a "huuuuuuuuuuuge [sic] misplay".

=== Streaming ===
Wreden transitioned to being a Twitch streamer and YouTuber under the name DougDoug, streaming first on March 9, 2019. He gained media attention in October 2020 after streaming Grand Theft Auto 5 on Twitch, where he allowed his viewers to input commands in the Twitch chat that affected the game.

In January 2022, he garnered more media attention after streaming and completing a Super Mario Odyssey "HUD Challenge" speedrun, wherein compounding heads-up displays (HUDs) appeared on his screen after every five minutes. Although he completed the challenge, he was unable to complete it in under one hour, 11 minutes, and 21 seconds, his personal non-"HUD Challenge" best.

In May 2023, Wreden streamed a custom simplified Dungeons & Dragons game set in a Walmart. The characters were played by Twitch viewers that change every few turns.

He retired his main YouTube channel in late 2025.

==== Philanthropy ====
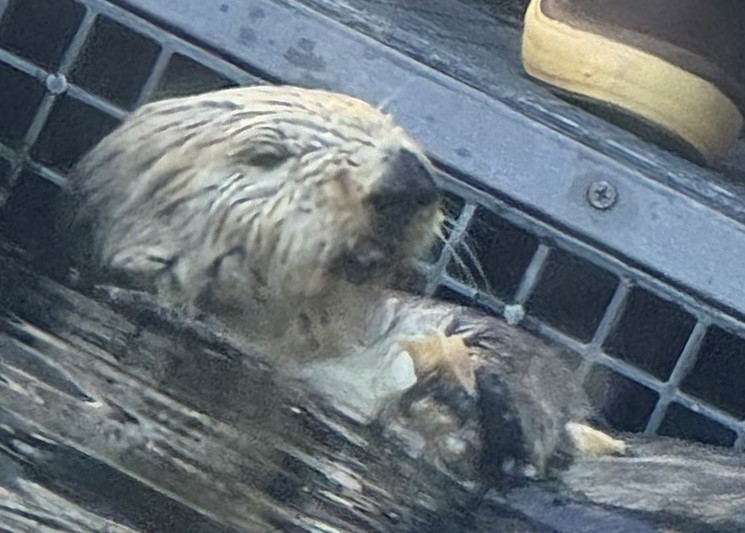
Rosa in 2023

Wreden has hosted annual charity livestreams to raise money for the Monterey Bay Aquarium since the 20th birthday of a sea otter at the aquarium named Rosa. The amount raised increased yearly, reaching over $14,000 in 2021, $100,000 in 2022, and over $300,000 for Rosa's 24th birthday in 2023.

Rosa died in June 2024. Wreden held his 2024 fundraiser stream in remembrance of Rosa, which raised over $620,000 for the Monterey Bay Aquarium. As of 2024, Wreden and his community have raised over $1,000,000 for the Monterey Bay Aquarium. In 2025, Wreden published a parodic book titled Doug: A DougDoug Story; the book consists primarily of the word "Doug" repeated throughout, and all profits from book sales are dedicated to the Monterey Bay Aquarium for the book's first year of publication.

As of August 2026, Wreden does not plan to hold a charity event for Monterey Bay Aquarium in 2026. He still plans to make a substantial personal donation to the aquarium, as well as donating all revenue from on-stream donations and subscriptions for the month of September.

=== Podcasting ===
In March 2025, Wreden launched the Lemonade Stand podcast with Brandon Ewing and Aiden McCaig, focusing on business, tech, and politics. Lemonade Stand is partnered with Vox Media as of October 2025.

== Awards and nominations ==
Year	Ceremony	Category	Result	Ref.
2022	The Streamer Awards	League of Their Own	Won	
2023	The Streamer Awards	Best Software and Game Development Streamer	Nominated	

== Bibliography ==
- Wreden, Douglas Scott (2025). Doug: A DougDoug Story. ISBN 979-8262151769.
