= The Beginner's Guide =

2015 interactive storytelling video game

- Developer: Everything Unlimited Ltd.
- Publisher: Everything Unlimited Ltd.
- Director: Davey Wreden
- Producer: Lydia Nelson
- Designers: Davey Wreden; Matthew Breit; Richard Flanagan
- Programmer: Jesús Higueras
- Artists: Matthew Breit; Jack Parsons; Andrea Jörgensen
- Writer: Davey Wreden
- Composers: Ryan Roth; Halina Heron
- Engine: Source
- Platforms: Linux, macOS, Windows
- Release: WW: October 1, 2015
- Genre: Interactive storytelling
- Mode: Single-player

The Beginner's Guide is an interactive storytelling video game created by Davey Wreden under the studio name Everything Unlimited Ltd. It was released for Linux, macOS, and Windows on October 1, 2015. It is Wreden's follow-up to the critically praised The Stanley Parable, initially released in 2013.

Narrated by Wreden, it takes the user through a number of incomplete and abstract game creations made by a developer named Coda. Wreden challenges the player to try to come to understand the type of person Coda is from exploring these spaces in a first-person perspective. Wreden has stated The Beginner's Guide is open to interpretation: some have seen it as general commentary on the nature of the relationship between game developers and players, while others have taken it as an allegory to Wreden's own personal struggles with success resulting from The Stanley Parable.

The Beginner's Guide received generally positive reviews. Many reviewers readily took to the narrative and the questions and ideas it raised on game development, while others felt it forced some of Wreden's thoughts too hard and in a pretentious manner.

== Gameplay ==
The gameplay in The Beginner's Guide is presented in a first-person perspective, allowing the player to move about and explore the environment and interact with some elements of it as they progress through interactive storytelling. The narrator, Wreden himself, describes what the player sees in each scene and makes conclusions on the nature of the developer. Some areas include puzzle solving and conversation trees, but there is no way for the player-character to die, or the player to make a mistake or lose. The narration helps the player get past certain parts that were otherwise difficult or insuperable as designed, such as by providing a bridge to cross an invisible maze. Once the player has completed a chapter, they can then return to replay it, as well as disable the narration (and the help it provides) to explore the spaces on their own. It has metafictional elements, primarily via Wreden's narration.

== Plot ==
In one of Coda's games, by removing the walls from a dead-end room, Wreden as narrator reveals to the user the numerous inaccessible corridors that were programmed into this game.

The Beginner's Guide is based on trying to understand the nature of a person based on exploring files and documents on their computer without ever meeting or speaking to that person. The player, aided by Wreden's narration, looks to understand a game developer named Coda whom Wreden had met at a game jam in 2009. Coda is considered enigmatic, having created numerous strange game ideas which he has subsequently deleted or stored away and forgotten. The player explores these games, most being exploration games developed from 2008 to 2011 that were only half-created, and is encouraged by Wreden's narration to try to imagine what Coda's personality would be like based on the abstract and unconventional game spaces and ideas. The Beginner's Guide is presented in generally chronological order of Coda's prototypes, showing the progression of Coda's work as the developer learned more.

Wreden's narration explains that he was inspired by many of Coda's game concepts, providing his own analysis of many of the themes he perceived to appear in Coda's games. Wreden observes that many of the games are based on themes of prisons, isolation, and difficulty in communicating with others, and that eventually Coda's games took a darker tone and took much longer to produce, focusing even more strongly on dialogue that implied that game development was no longer a positive activity for Coda. One game near the end displays Coda's creative frustrations "up to eleven". Wreden felt concerned that Coda was feeling depressed and weighed down by game development, and took it upon himself to show some of Coda's game concepts to others to get feedback to help encourage Coda to develop more. However, this in turn led to Coda to draw into seclusion. At some point in 2011, Wreden believed Coda had stopped making games, until he was sent an email with a private link to a final game by Coda.

This game, its design in stark contrast to the others Coda had made, includes puzzles that were intentionally designed to be almost impossible to solve, such as an invisible maze, a six-digit combination that the player must randomly guess, and an impossible-to-open door that cannot be opened from within the room the door leads out of. Wreden found that when he bypassed these challenges using programming, he ended up in a gallery with a message from Coda directed at him personally, thanking him for his interest in Coda's games but asking him not to talk to him any more, nor to showcase his games to others. The messages implied Coda felt that Wreden mistook the tone of his games for a sign of an emotional struggle and was missing the point of why he had engaged in game design, as well as accusing Wreden of an act of betrayal in modifying Coda's games to add more symbolism. Wreden reveals that the purpose of The Beginner's Guide is to try to reconnect to Coda by sharing his games with the public at large and to apologize for his actions.

The Beginner's Guide concludes with an ambiguous epilogue level that may or may not have been designed by Coda, with Wreden sparsely narrating about his dependence on social validation, which he views as the reason he showed Coda's games to other people. Shortly before the end, the emotional turmoil dredged up by recording the narration grows to be too much for Wreden, and he excuses himself as the player makes their way to the end of the final level. At the denouement, the player must jump into a beam from an earlier game, causing them to float up to see an infinite maze.

=== Interpretations ===
Within The Beginner's Guide, Wreden states that his picture of Coda is open to interpretation and invites players to share their own theories with him, providing his email address near the start.

One common interpretation is that the game is a metaphor for Wreden's own success and attempts to move past his struggles. Destructoid writer Darren Nakamura points out that for Wreden to publish a game at cost that is claimed to be the work of someone else, released without their permission, would be illegal, and thus Coda must be a fiction. Emanuel Maiberg of Motherboard theorizes that Coda is in fact Wreden himself, with Coda representing Wreden's own psyche up to and including the release of The Stanley Parable. Among other hints, Maiberg points to the definition of "coda" being "a concluding part of a literary or dramatic work", and the theme of closing one door and moving on repeats frequently. Maiberg also draws a parallel between the player in Coda's game being inundated with abstract figures from the press, and the attention Wreden had received following The Stanley Parable's re-release. Christopher Byrd, writing for the Washington Post, points to blog posts made by Wreden after he had received a great deal of attention following the re-release of The Stanley Parable, and that the version of Wreden is really a fictionalized version of himself acting as an unreliable narrator, building upon his own personal experiences from the sudden media spotlight in the relationship between the fictional Wreden and Coda; the line "When I'm around you, I feel physically ill" is a quote from The Stanley Parable sound designer Robin Arnott during an argument with Wreden. Interactive fiction writer Emily Short believes that neither Wreden-as-narrator nor Coda are to be taken as Wreden's own self, but instead stand-ins for the player and game developer, respectively, that Wreden attempts to show sympathy for in modern game development.

Another interpretation is that it is commentary on the role between the video game developer and their audience. PC World's Hayden Dingman believed that it was designed to demonstrate the fallacy of the essay "The Death of the Author" as applied to video game development, in which commentators attempt to attribute aspects of a game to how the developer approached it, as opposed to considering how it affected themselves. Gamasutra's editor-in-chief Kris Graft notes that, as it attempts to deconstruct the way players will interpret narrative video games, any attempt to interpret the deeper meaning behind The Beginner's Guide is paradoxically "committing all of the sins" that it presents as problems with player interpretations of games. Laura Mandanas, writing for Autostraddle, described it as "a man (poorly) coming to terms with his hugely overinflated sense of entitlement", interpreting the themes as not only applicable to game development, but also to inter-personal relationships.

Some have taken The Beginner's Guide to be a work of non-fiction, as at face value it consists of the works of a real developer who is not Wreden, which would be an unethical use of someone else's work and potentially copyright-violating. Destructoid's Laura Kate Dale commented that the game is short enough to fall within the Steam refund window for those who believed it was non-fiction and thus contained stolen works. Dale's statement initially led to some controversy in the belief that Dale was suggesting misuse of the Steam refund system, though she later clarified she was only addressing those believing it to be non-fiction. The controversy led some to point out that a player's interpretation of the game is very personal, differing between each player; Wreden himself refused to affirm or deny any interpretation, until confirming its ultimately fictional nature in an in-depth interview with the podcast Tone Control.

== Development ==
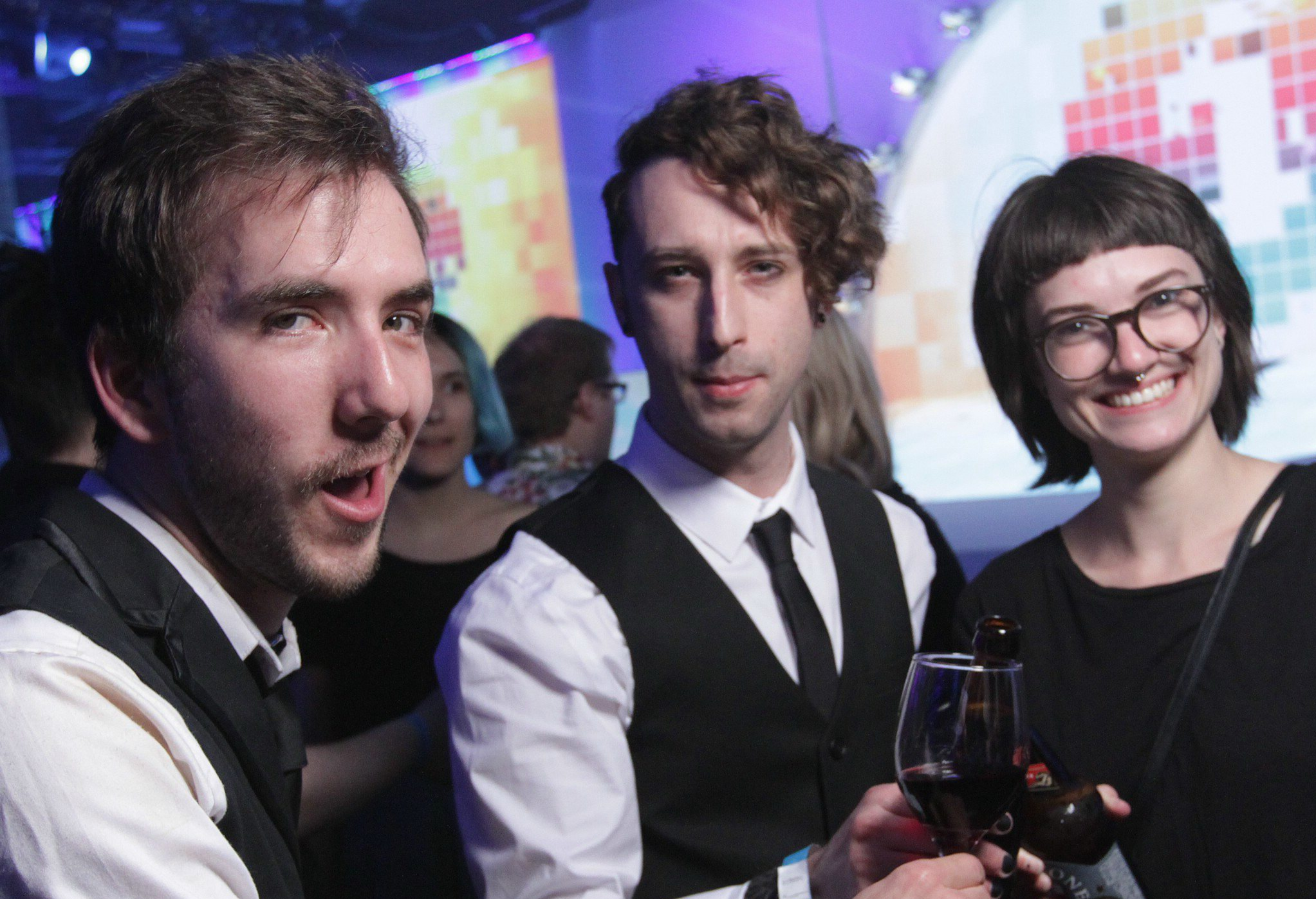
The Beginner's Guide was created by Davey Wreden (left), with music by Ryan Roth (center) and Halina Heron.

The Beginner's Guide was developed on the Source engine, which itself serves as part of Wreden's commentary within it on the nature of level design limited by the Source engine. Wreden has stated that he does not plan to give media interviews about The Beginner's Guide and is letting it speak for itself.

The Beginner's Guide was announced by Wreden two days before its official release on October 1, 2015. It was developed by Wreden himself; his co-creator for The Stanley Parable, William Pugh, had been engaged in creating a new studio, Crows Crows Crows, and working on projects with Justin Roiland, the co-creator of Rick and Morty.

== Reception ==
Reception

Aggregate score
Aggregator	Score
Metacritic	76/100

Review scores
Publication	Score
Eurogamer	80%
GameSpot	8/10
Giant Bomb	4/5
IGN	8/10
Washington Post	100/100
Good Game	10/10
Paste	9.0/10
Game Informer	8/10
Shacknews	3/10
USgamer	3/5
PC Gamer	69/100

The Beginner's Guide received "generally favorable" reviews, according to review aggregator website Metacritic. Jeffrey Matulef of Eurogamer considered The Beginner's Guide to be one of the site's "Essential" titles, calling it a novel approach to providing story without relying on non-player characters or collectible diaries, and also an insight into Wreden's own psyche. Stephanie Bendixsen and Steven O'Donnell of Good Game both gave it five stars, O'Donnell calling it "gut-wrenchingly emotional" and Bendixsen commenting that "honestly made me experience the whole creative process in a completely different way."

Edmond Tran of GameSpot, rating the game 8 out of 10, wrote that it asks philosophical questions on the nature of the role between game developers and players, and how to understand some elements of video game design. Paste's Cameron Kunzelman compared Wreden's self-insertion as the narrator to that of Alfred Hitchcock, and suggested that Wreden's Janus-like duality between narrator and developer poses many questions for the player to think about regarding the nature of video game development. Jeff Marchiafava for Game Informer, rating it an 8 out of 10, stated that Wreden's approach to The Beginner's Guide created a thought-provoking experience, "tackling serious human issues and emotions in a wholly unique way."

Todd Martens, writing for the Los Angeles Times, said that The Beginner's Guide is "an odd, thoughtful and beautifully surreal game" with much of its imagery being iconic and memorable well after the player has finished it. Christopher Byrd, writing for the Washington Post, said The Beginner's Guide blurred the line with interactive art and called it "one of the most emotionally alive games on the market." The Boston Globe's Jesse Singal stated that with The Beginner's Guide, "Wreden is pushing the boundaries of storytelling in video games", including using narrative tricks that went beyond those that were already used in The Stanley Parable.

Other reviewers criticized it, finding the narration and intended message was too forced. Brittany Vincent of Shacknews was more critical, rating it 3 out of 10, and stated that the narration was pretentious while the concepts felt forced and overly complex. Ars Technica's Sam Machkovech called it Wreden's "sophomore slump", and felt that while it was intended as a personal journal for Wreden, his emotion-driven narration telegraphed the final moments and failed to follow "show, don't tell" narrative techniques. US Gamer's Bob Mackey rated it an 2 of 5 stars, sharing the same opinion as Machkovech that Wreden's narration pushed too much interpretation onto the player, and felt a game like The Magic Circle, also dealing with exploring an unfinished game and the reasons for why it was unfinished, succeeded better at presenting this idea. Tyler Wilde of PC Gamer gave it an 69 out of 100 rating, feeling that some of Wreden's messages were delivered a bit heavy-handedly through the narration but still positively critiquing some of the experimental approaches that were used for narration and player experience.

=== Awards ===
Gamasutra highlighted Wreden as one of the top 10 developers in 2015 for his work in The Beginner's Guide. It was named as one of the top new IP for 2015 by Destructoid. The New Yorker included The Beginner's Guide among its top 11 games for 2015. It was nominated for two 2016 Game Developers Choice Awards for Innovation and Best Narrative, and for two Independent Games Festival awards for Excellence in Narrative and the Nuovo Award for Innovation. The Beginner's Guide was nominated for "Most Innovative" game of 2015 by IGN.
