= Lemonade Stand (podcast) =

Business podcast

- Genre: Business
- Language: English

Cast and voices
- Hosted by: Brandon Ewing (Atrioc); Aiden McCaig (Calvin); Doug Wreden (DougDoug)

Production
- Length: 78 – 118 minutes

Publication
- No. of episodes: 70
- Original release: March 6, 2025
- Provider: Vox Media

Lemonade Stand is a business podcast that launched on March 6, 2025, hosted by content creators Brandon Ewing (Atrioc), Aiden McCaig (Calvin), and Douglas Wreden (DougDoug). The podcast discusses business, technology, and politics, targeting a primarily Generation Z audience. In October 2025, Vox Media announced a partnership with the podcast, assuming sales, marketing, and distribution responsibilities.

== Background ==
In 2024, Aiden McCaig, cohost of comedy podcast The Yard, approached Brandon Ewing, a Twitch streamer with prior marketing experience at Nvidia and Twitch, with the idea of launching a business podcast together. Shortly thereafter, Doug Wreden, better known as DougDoug, messaged Ewing and expressed interest in joining the venture as an additional cohost, believing his experience in computer science would lend itself to discussions about tech.

The podcast aired its first episode on March 6, 2025. The show was initially supported entirely through Patreon subscriptions, offering supporters bonus episodes, access to a private Discord server, and a book club. By October 2025, the podcast was generating more than $58,000 per month through this model.

In October 2025, Vox Media announced a partnership with the podcast. Under the agreement, Vox Media assumed responsibility for sales, marketing, and distribution, and advertising was introduced to the program. The show joined Vox Media's business and technology podcast portfolio alongside Pivot, Waveform: the MKBHD Podcast, Decoder, Solutions, and Channels.

== Hosts ==
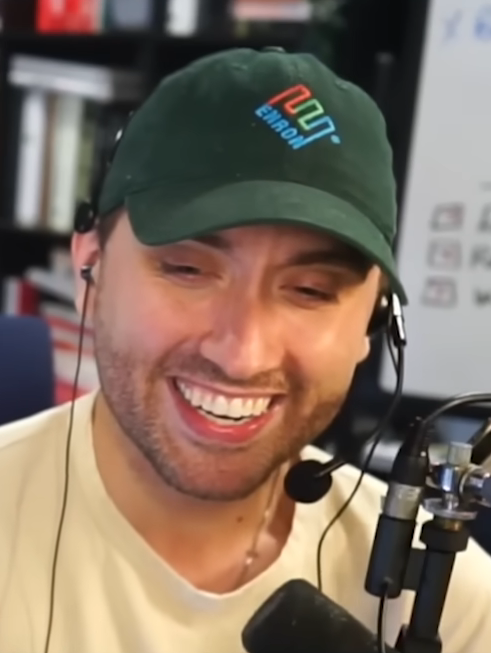
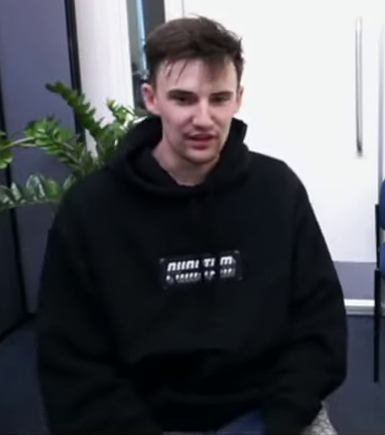
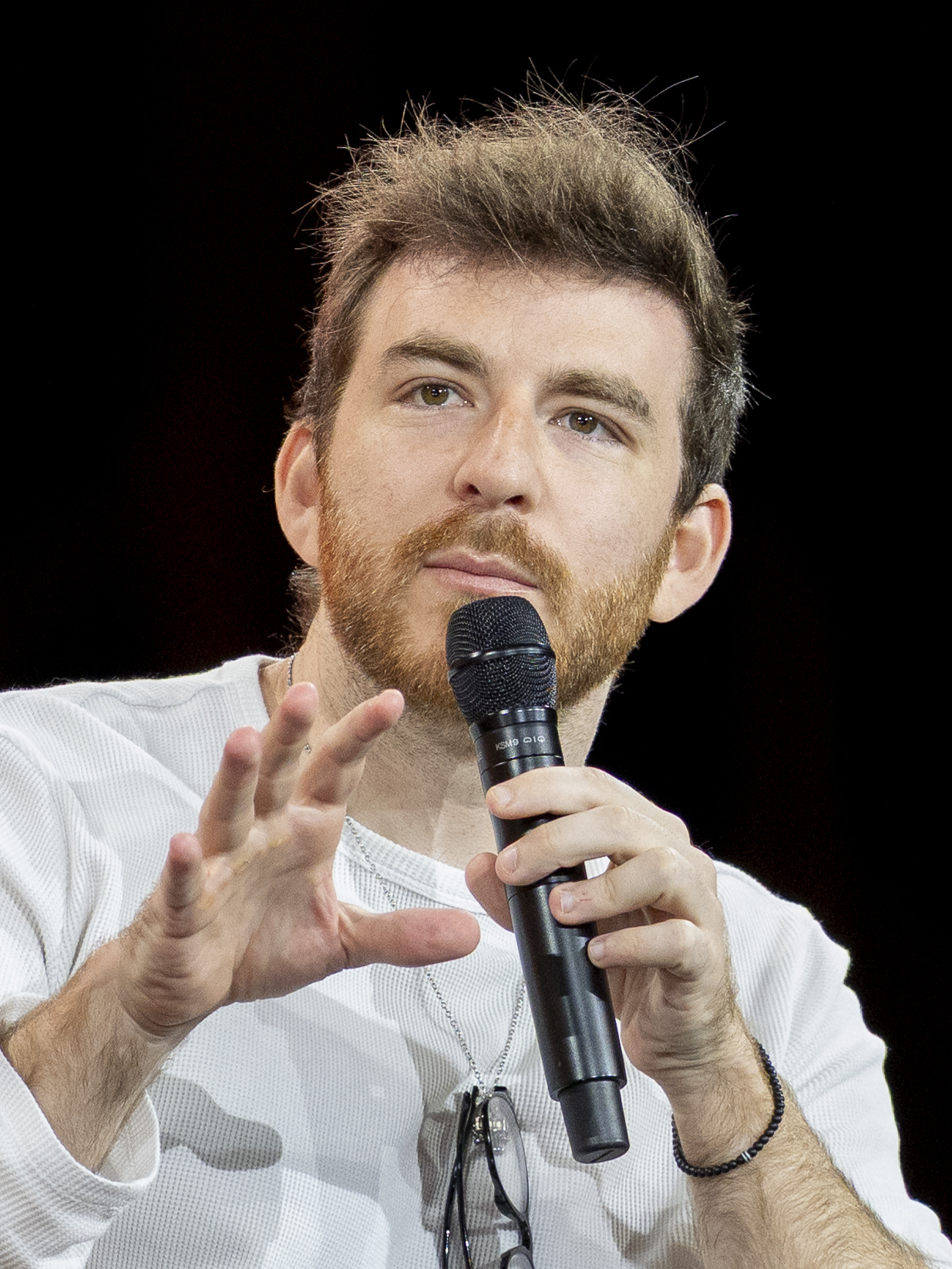
From left to right, the podcast is hosted by Brandon Ewing, Aiden McCaig, and Douglas Wreden.
- Brandon Ewing (Atrioc) is a Twitch streamer and YouTuber known for his business news coverage, such as his Marketing Monday series, as well as video gaming content. Prior to becoming a full-time content creator, he worked as a marketer for Twitch and Nvidia.
- Aiden McCaig (Calvin) is a podcaster known for his role on The Yard, a comedy podcast. He is also the chief operating officer of Mogul Moves, the business behind Ludwig Ahgren's content creation.
- Douglas Wreden (DougDoug) is a Twitch streamer and YouTuber known for content focused on video game challenges and software coding experiments. He previously worked as a programmer at Electronic Arts and as an esports tournament producer.

Among the three hosts, Ewing is positioned as the business/finance specialist, McCaig the politics specialist, and Wreden the tech specialist.

== Reception ==
Bloomberg described the podcast as emerging from Amazon's Twitch streaming platform, noting it represented "a platform we haven't yet seen mined for podcast talent." The podcast's audience demographics were reported as 91% male and 60% Generation Z, a notably young audience for a business-focused program.

== Notable guests ==
The podcast's first guest was former chair of the Federal Trade Commission Lina Khan, who appeared for an interview in July 2025. In October of that year, the podcast interviewed businessman and investor Steve Eisman.
