= Roman Wreden =

Russian physician (1867–1934)

- Роман Вреден
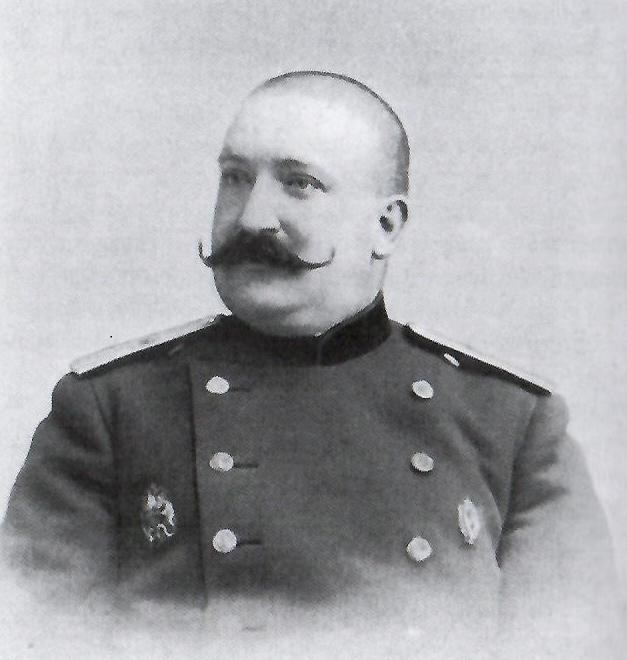
- Born: 9 March 1897; Saint Petersburg, Russian Empire
- Died: 7 February 1934 (aged 36); Leningrad, Soviet Union
- Other name: Edmund Robert Wreden
- Awards: See list: Order of Saint Stanislaus, 2nd degree with swords (1904); Order of Saint Vladimir, 4th degree with swords (1905); Order of Saint Anna, 2nd class (1905); Commander's Cross of the French Legion of Honor (1907); Order of Saint Vladimir, 3rd degree (1912); Order of St. Stanislaus, 1st degree (1915)

Roman Romanovich Wreden (Note: In this name that follows East Slavic naming customs, the patronymic is Romanovich and the family name is Wreden.) (21 March [O.S. 9 March] 1867) was a Russian and Soviet physician, field surgeon and orthopedist.

== Biography ==
According to the Great Soviet and Great Russian Encyclopedias, Wreden was born on March 21, 1867. However, some sources state that he was born on March 23.

In 1885, Wreden graduated from the First Saint-Petersburg Gymnasium with a gold medal and later in 1890, he also graduated from the Imperial Academy of Medical Surgery.

He spent three years training his skills further at the academy hospital's surgery clinic. After this in 1893, he successfully defended his dissertation to become a Doctor of Medicine.

From 1893 to 1896, Wreden was a junior resident at the Kiev Military Hospital, in charge of the surgical department. During his tenure here, he provided treatment to Mikhail Dragomirov.

From 1896 — he was a senior assistant at Vasily Ratimov's surgical clinic, and from 1898, he was a privatdozent and from 1900 to 1902, he served as the acting head of the department.

In 1902, he failed the competition for the position of head of the academy's surgical department, resigning from the academy.
