= John Steinbeck bibliography =

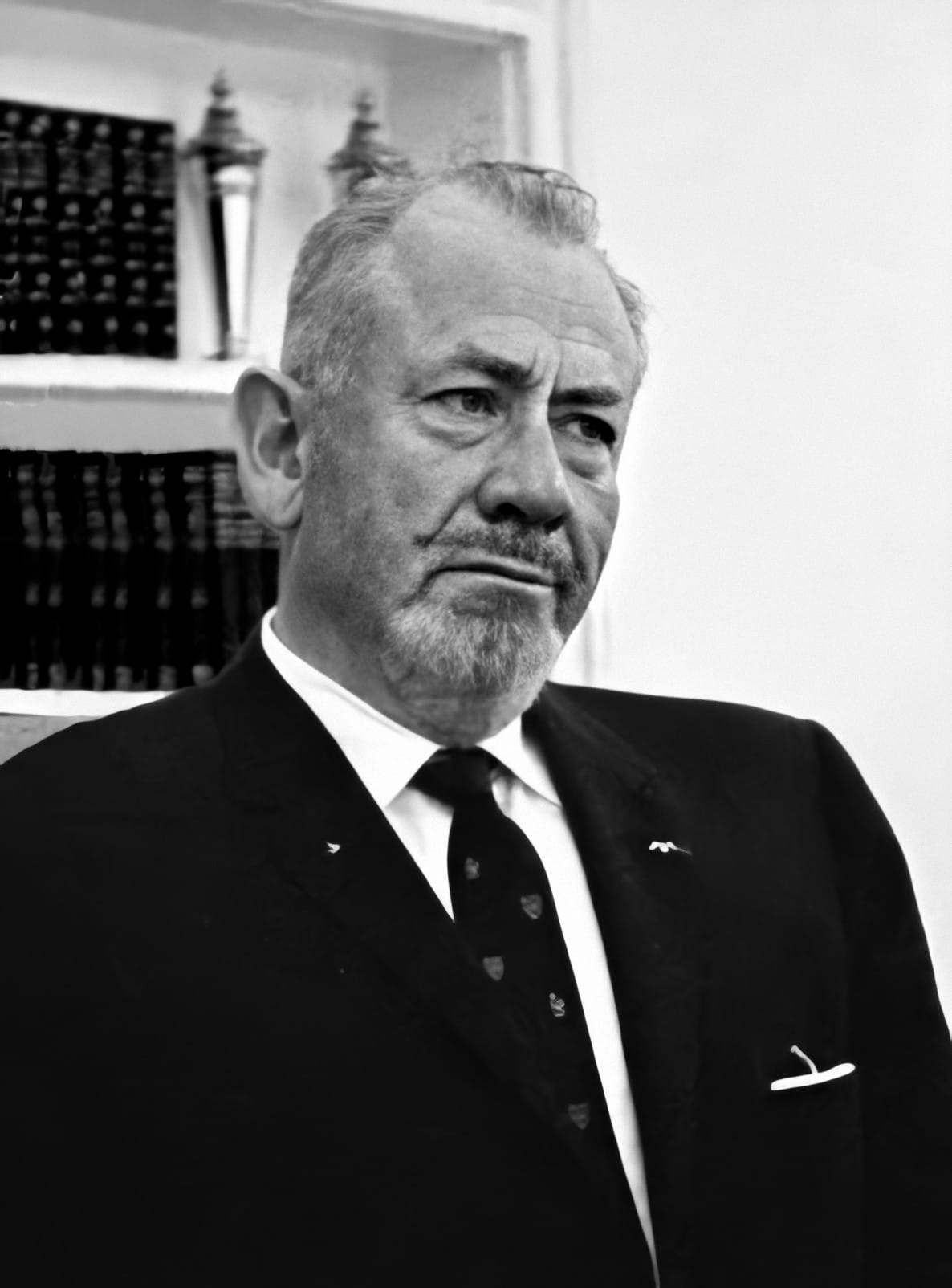
- Novels↙: 11
- Novella↙: 6
- Short story collections↙: 2
- Nonfiction↙: 12
- Screenplays↙: 5

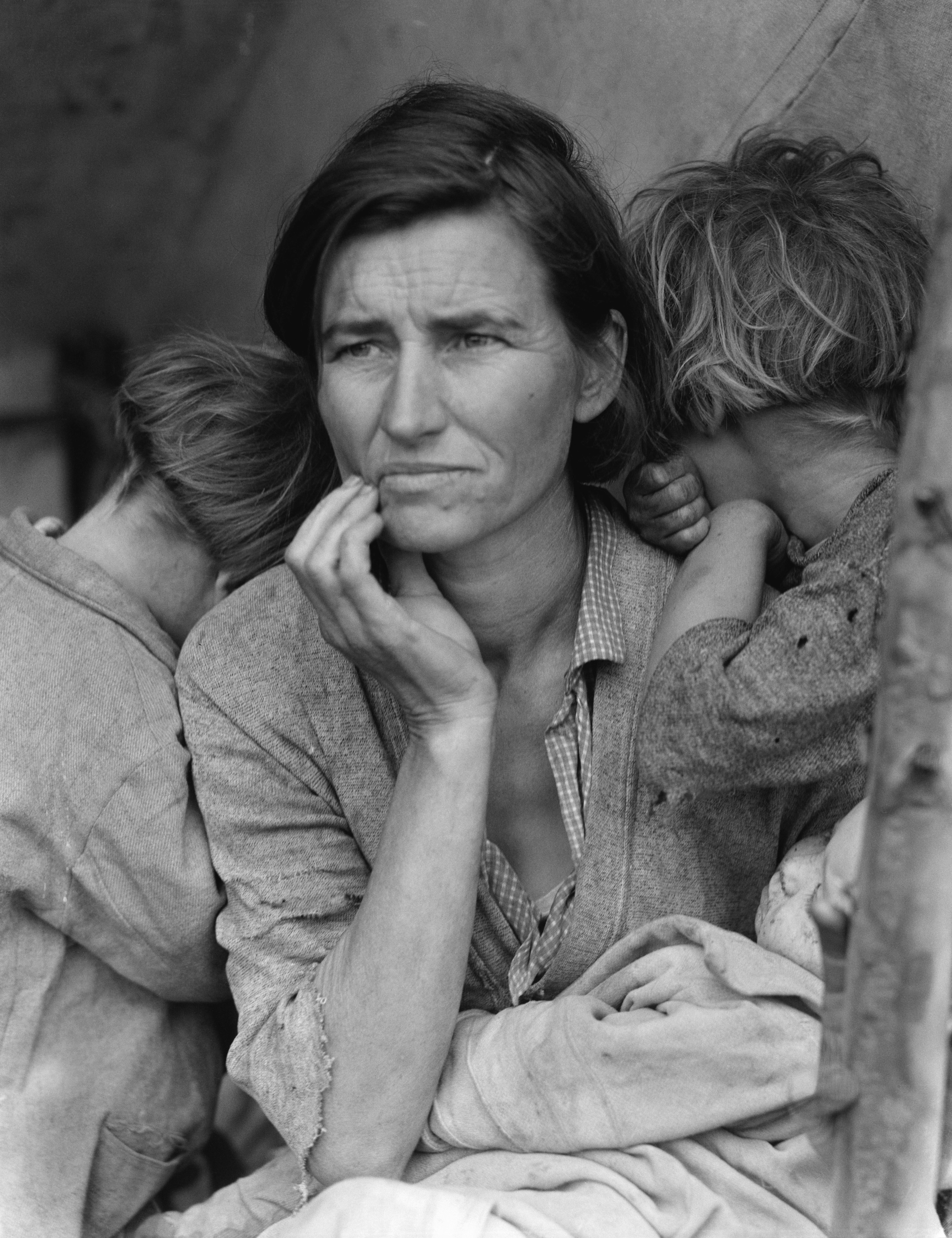
The Grapes of Wrath takes place during The Great Depression and, like many of Steinbeck's novels, is set in California

The following is a complete list of books published by John Steinbeck, one of the foremost American authors of the 20th century. Steinbeck published seventeen works of fiction and ten works of nonfiction between 1929 and 1966, as well as his work writing short stories and screenplays. Born in California, his novels often center around Americans navigating life in Western states in the early 20th century. Although The Grapes of Wrath and Of Mice and Men remain his most popular novels, Steinbeck himself regarded East of Eden as his magnum opus. All of these were New York Times Bestsellers along with The Moon Is Down and Cannery Row. He won the 1962 Nobel Prize in Literature "for his realistic and imaginative writings, combining as they do sympathetic humor and keen social perception".

== Fiction ==
=== Novels ===
Title	Year	Notes
Cup of Gold	1929	Historical fiction based on the life of Welsh privateer Henry Morgan.
To a God Unknown	1933	Centers on a California rancher who develops a religious infatuation with the land around him.
Tortilla Flat	1935	Steinbeck's first critical and commercial success; adapted into a film of the same name
In Dubious Battle	1936	Set amid a strike organized on a California farm; adapted into a film of the same name
The Grapes of Wrath	1939	Set during the Dust Bowl and Great Depression in Oklahoma and California; winner of the National Book Award and Pulitzer Prize; adapted into a film of the same name
Cannery Row	1945	Set among canning factories in Monterey, California
The Wayward Bus	1947	Switches between multiple viewpoints of characters within California's Salinas valley; lacked critical praise although commercially successful
East of Eden	1952	Steinbeck's most ambitious novel; follows two American families in the 19th and 20th centuries
Sweet Thursday	1954	Sequel to Cannery Row
The Winter of Our Discontent	1961	Set among aristocrats in Sag Harbor, New York; Steinbeck's last true novel (unadapted from an existing source)
The Acts of King Arthur and His Noble Knights	1976	A retelling of the story of King Arthur, based on the Winchester Manuscript text of Sir Thomas Malory's Le Morte d'Arthur along with some personal letters concerning the Arthurian legend. It is unfinished, containing only Tales 1 and 3, published posthumously.

=== Novellas ===
Title	Year	Notes
The Red Pony	1937	Consisting of stories centring on Jody Tiflin, a boy growing up on a California ranch; originally serialized between 1933 and 1936, then as a standalone volume in 1937 by Covici Friede
Of Mice and Men	1937	Two men's friendship on a California ranch, one of whom is mentally disabled; frequently taught in schools, though also frequently censored; subject of numerous adaptions
The Moon Is Down	1942	Set in a small Norwegian town occupied by the nazis during World War 2; written to be adapted for the stage; Steinbeck's first book since Cup of Gold to be set outside of California; subject of the King Haakon VII Freedom Cross
The Pearl	1947	Concerning pearl divers inspired by a Mexican folk tale; one of Steinbeck's most popular and most taught works
Burning Bright	1950	Published as an attempt to put a play into novel form
The Short Reign of Pippin IV: A Fabrication	1957	Political satire of French politics

=== Short story collections ===
Title	Year	Notes
The Pastures of Heaven	1932	Series of 12 interconnected stories taking place in Monterey, California
The Long Valley	1938	Compilation of 12 separate short stories, many individually published previously; includes Steinbeck's novella The Red Pony

== Nonfiction ==
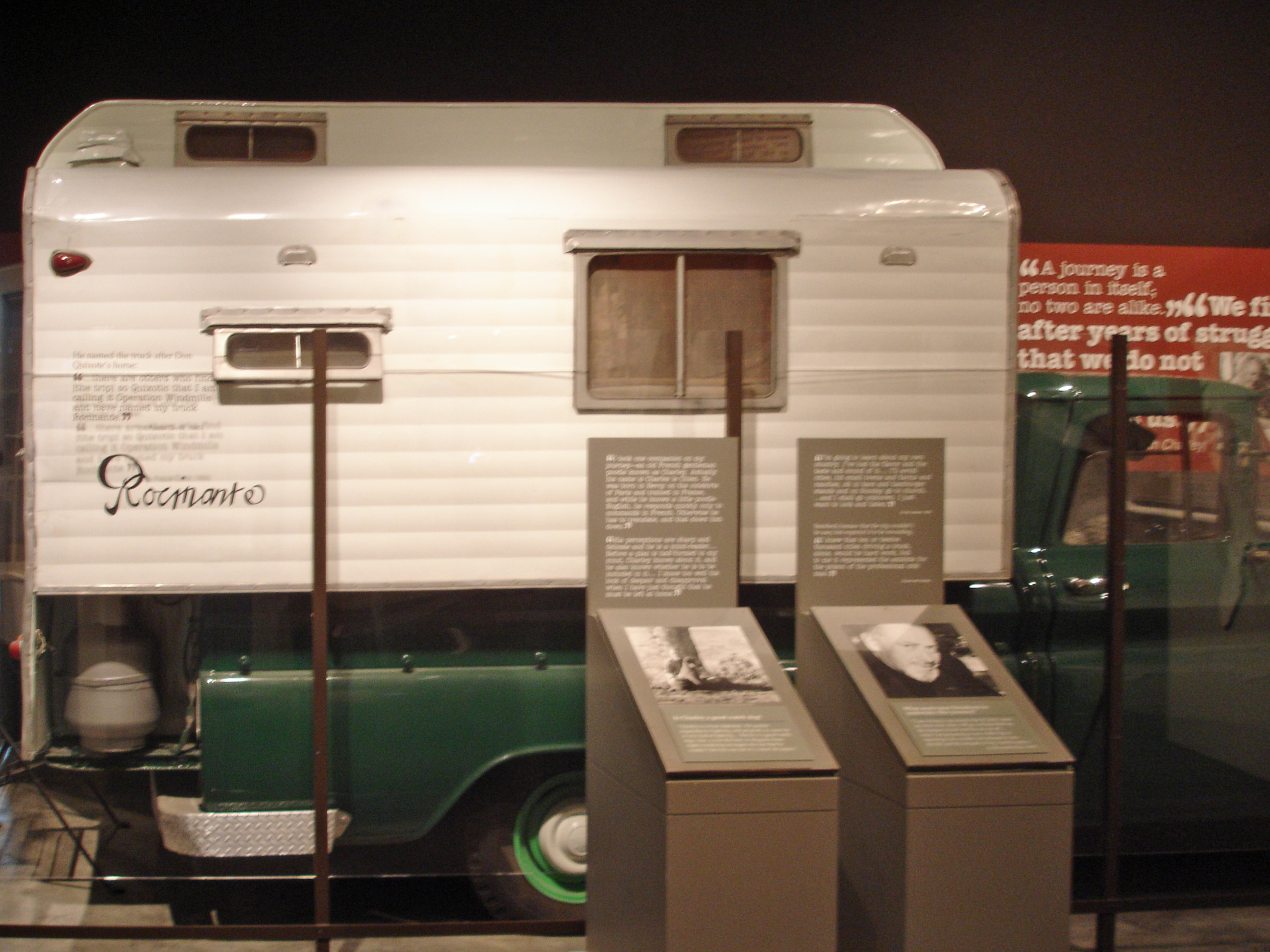
The pick-up truck and mobile home that Steinbeck used to travel around the United States, documented in Travels with Charley

Title	Year	Notes
The Harvest Gypsies	1936	A series of articles for The San Francisco News about migrant workers in California; collected as Their Blood is Strong in 1938 by Dorothea Lange, with an epilogue by Steinbeck, "Starvation Under the Orange Trees"
The Log from the Sea of Cortez	1951	A chronicle of Steinbeck's experience collecting marine specimens in the Gulf of California with his friend Ed Ricketts; originally published as Sea of Cortez: A Leisurely Journal of Travel and Research, which provided his account as well as portions by Ricketts
Bombs Away: The Story of a Bomber Team	1942	A commissioned work, where Steinbeck wrote about U.S. bomber squads involved in World War II
A Russian Journal	1948	Eyewitness account of a journey through the Soviet Union during the Cold War
Once There Was a War	1958	War articles published in the New York Herald in 1943
Travels with Charley: In Search of America	1962	A chronicle of a journey across the United States with his dog, Charley; Steinbeck's best-known work of nonfiction
America and Americans	1966	A collection of essays focusing on America; the last book published in Steinbeck's lifetime
Journal of a Novel: The East of Eden Letters	1969	The letters that accompanied East of Eden, written to his friend and editor Pascal Covici
Steinbeck: A Life in Letters	1975	The collected letters of Steinbeck
Letters to Elizabeth: A Selection of Letters from John Steinbeck to Elizabeth Otis	1978	A collection of letters from John Steinbeck to his friend and literary agent, Elizabeth Otis
Working Days: The Journals of the Grapes of Wrath	1989	A journal that Steinbeck kept while writing The Grapes of Wrath in 1938
Steinbeck in Vietnam: Dispatches from the War	2012	A collection of dispatches written by Steinbeck for Newsday during the Vietnam War

== Screenplays ==
Title	Year	Notes
The Forgotten Village	1941	Documentary depicting life in a small Mexican village, and changes brought by modernization
Lifeboat	1944	Follows a group of survivors of a German U-boat attack adrift on a lifeboat; screenplay written by Steinbeck on request from director Alfred Hitchcock, though he later criticized the film's direction
The Pearl	1947	Based on Steinbeck's 1947 novella of the same name about pearl divers in a fishing village; Steinbeck also co-wrote the screenplay
The Red Pony	1949	Based on Steinbeck's 1937 work of the same name, set on a ranch in Salinas Valley, California; Steinbeck also co-wrote the screenplay
Viva Zapata!	1952	Fictionalization of the life of Emiliano Zapata, a key revolutionary in the Mexican Revolution
