= Cannery Row (disambiguation) =

Cannery Row is a street in Monterey, California.

Cannery Row may also refer to:

- Cannery Row (novel), a 1945 novel by John Steinbeck
  - Cannery Row (film), a 1982 film adapted from the novel
- "Cannery Row", a 2012 Judge John Hodgman podcast episode
- Cannery Row, Nashville, an area near downtown Nashville, Tennessee

== See also ==
- Canary Row, a 1949 Merrie Melodies short
