= The Winter of Our Discontent =

1961 novel by John Steinbeck

- First edition
- Author: John Steinbeck
- Language: English
- Publisher: The Viking Press
- Publication date: 1961
- Publication place: United States
- Media type: Print (hardback & paperback)
- Pages: 311 pp

The Winter of Our Discontent is John Steinbeck's last novel, published in 1961. The title comes from the first two lines of William Shakespeare's Richard III: "Now is the winter of our discontent / Made glorious summer by this sun [or son] of York". It is Steinbeck's only work to take place entirely on the East Coast of the United States; it is primarily set in Sag Harbor, New York.

== Plot summary ==
The story mainly concerns Ethan Allen Hawley of New Baytown, New York, a former member of Long Island's aristocratic class. Ethan's late father lost the family fortune and thus Ethan works as a grocery store clerk in the store his family once owned. His wife Mary and their children resent their mediocre social and economic status and do not value the honesty and integrity that Ethan struggles to maintain amidst a corrupt society. These external factors and his own psychological turmoil lead him to abandon his inherent integrity in order to reclaim his former status and wealth.

Ethan's decision to gain wealth and power is influenced by criticisms and advice from people he knows. His acquaintance Margie urges him to accept bribes and the bank manager (whose ancestors Ethan blames for his family's misfortunes) urges him to be more ruthless. Ethan's friend Joey, a bank teller, even gives Ethan a lesson on how to rob a bank and get away with it.

On discovering that the current store owner, Italian American Alfio Marullo, may be an illegal immigrant, Ethan makes an anonymous tip to the Immigration and Naturalization Service. After Marullo is taken into custody, he transfers ownership of the store to Ethan because he believes Ethan is honest and deserving. Ethan also considers, plans and rehearses a bank robbery, failing to perform it only because of external circumstances. He gives Danny Taylor, the town drunk and his childhood friend, money to drink himself to death and Danny leaves an important piece of land to Ethan's wife in his will.

In this manner, Ethan becomes able to control the covert dealings of the corrupt town businessmen and politicians, but he tells himself that he will not be corrupted. He considers that while he had to kill enemy soldiers in the war, he was never a murderer thereafter.

Ethan learns that his son won honorable mention in a nationwide essay contest by plagiarizing classic American authors and orators, but when Ethan confronts him, the son denies having any guilty feelings, maintaining that everyone cheats and lies. Perhaps after seeing his own moral decay in his son's actions, and experiencing the guilt of Marullo's deportation and the death of Danny, Ethan resolves to commit suicide. His daughter, intuitively understanding his intent, slips a family talisman into his pocket during a long embrace. When Ethan decides to commit the act, he reaches into his pocket to find razorblades and instead finds the talisman. As the tide comes into the alcove in which he has sequestered himself, he struggles to get out in order to return the talisman to his daughter.

== Main characters ==
- Ethan Allen Hawley – a grocery clerk (the story's protagonist)
- Mary Hawley – Ethan's wife
- Margie Young-Hunt – seductress and Mary's friend
- Mr. Baker – banker
- Alfio Marullo – Italian immigrant owner of grocery store

== Literary significance and criticism ==
Edward Weeks of the Atlantic Monthly reviewed the book as a Steinbeck classic, writing, "His dialogue is full of life, the entrapment of Ethan is ingenious, and the morality in this novel marks Mr. Steinbeck's return to the mood and the concern with which he wrote The Grapes of Wrath." The Swedish Academy agreed and awarded Steinbeck the Nobel Prize for Literature in 1962. The presentation speech by Anders Österling, the permanent secretary of the Swedish Academy, remarked specifically on five books from 1935 to 1939 and continued thus:

In this brief presentation it is not possible to dwell at any length on individual works which Steinbeck later produced. If at times the critics have seemed to note certain signs of flagging powers, of repetitions that might point to a decrease in vitality, Steinbeck belied their fears most emphatically with The Winter of Our Discontent (1961), a novel published last year. Here he attained the same standard which he set in The Grapes of Wrath. Again he holds his position as an independent expounder of the truth with an unbiased instinct for what is genuinely American, be it good or bad.

Saul Bellow also lauded the book, writing, "John Steinbeck returns to the high standards of The Grapes of Wrath and to the social themes that made his early work so impressive, and so powerful." However, many reviewers in America were disappointed. A few years later, Peter Lisca called Winter "undeniable evidence of the aesthetic and philosophical failure of [Steinbeck's] later fiction".

In letters to friends before and after its publication, Steinbeck stated that he wrote the novel to address the moral degeneration of American culture during the 1950s and 1960s. American criticism of his moralism started to change during the 1970s after the Watergate scandal. Reloy Garcia, describing his reassessment of the work when asked to update his original Study Guide to Winter, wrote, "The book I then so impetuously criticized as somewhat thin, now strikes me as a deeply penetrating study of the American condition. I did not realize, at the time, that we had a condition," and he attributes this change of heart to "our own enriched experience".

In 1983, Carol Ann Kasparek condemned the character of Ethan for his implausibility and still called Steinbeck’s treatment of American moral decay superficial, although she went on to approve the story's mythic elements.

The professor of literature and Steinbeck scholar Stephen K. George wrote, "With these authors [Saul Bellow, Brent Weeks, and Ruth Stiles Gannett] I would contend that, given its multi-layered complexity, intriguing artistry, and clear moral purpose, The Winter of Our Discontent ranks in the upper echelon of Steinbeck’s fiction, alongside Of Mice and Men, Cannery Row, East of Eden, and, of course, The Grapes of Wrath."

The novel was the last that Steinbeck completed before his death in 1968. The Acts of King Arthur and His Noble Knights and the screenplay for Zapata were both published posthumously in unfinished forms.

== Narrative point of view ==
Steinbeck makes use of an unusual structural device in Winter, switching between three different styles of narrative points of view. The novel is presented in two halves, Part One and Part Two, and each half starts with two chapters written in third person narration. After these two chapters in each half, the point of view changes to first person, narrated by the protagonist, Ethan Hawley. The four chapters in third person narrative are mostly presented from the point of view of Ethan, but not in first person, a technique known as free indirect discourse, or free indirect speech. There are two exceptions to this: the first is an interlude at the start of chapter 12 where the point of view switches to that of Margie: "when a more intimate view is needed of the seductress Margie Young-Hunt . . . the third person narrative reappears". The second exception is the interlude at the start of chapter 11 which is presented by the author as an omniscient narrator, before the chapter reverts to Ethan's point of view. The three different narrative styles are therefore: omniscient narrator (chapter 11 part), free indirect discourse from multiple points of view (chapters 1, 2, 11 and 12) and first person narrative from a single point of view (the rest of the book).

== Themes ==
A major theme found in The Winter of Our Discontent is the effect of societal pressure. At the beginning of the novel, Ethan Hawley is unhappy with his job as a grocery store clerk, but it is the complaints from his wife and children about their social and economic status that drive his character to change his beliefs about wealth and power. He is also influenced by close acquaintances who encourage him to accept bribes and speak in ways indicating that money is the most important thing in their lives. For example, Ethan’s banker friend Joey Morphy exemplifies how important money is by saying "your only entrance is money" (144), and “we all bow down to the Great God Currency” (132). This man’s life revolved around money and making more of it. Later in the novel, Ethan plans out a bank robbery and would have acted on it had it not been for a last minute distraction. In the land situation with Danny, Ethan plays the role of the kind friend, but ultimately receives the important piece of land that other men were competing for as well. His greed and lust for power catch up with Ethan at the end of the novel when he realizes his own son plagiarized for the “Why I Love America” contest. But the son's purpose in entering the contest was not to show love for his country, but rather to gain materialistic rewards from it like a watch and trip, in addition to appearing on TV (Chapters 5, 11, 21). Ethan feels guilty for his actions and as a result, becomes suicidal.

== Film adaptation ==
The novel was made into a television movie for the Hallmark Hall of Fame in 1983, featuring Donald Sutherland, Teri Garr, and Tuesday Weld.
