= Sweet Thursday (novel) =

1954 novel by John Steinbeck

- First edition
- Author: John Steinbeck
- Language: English
- Publisher: Viking Press
- Publication date: June 10, 1954
- Publication place: United States
- Media type: Novel (hardcover)
- ISBN: 0-670-68686-7
- Preceded by: Cannery Row

Sweet Thursday is a 1954 novel by John Steinbeck. It is a sequel to Cannery Row and set in the years after the end of World War II.

According to Steinbeck in the narrative, "Sweet Thursday" is the day between Lousy Wednesday and Waiting Friday.

== Genesis of the novel ==
In the wake of World War II, Steinbeck left California for New York City and divorced his second wife Gwyn Conger Steinbeck in 1948. He married the actress Elaine Scott and became interested in writing for the theater, writing the play Burning Bright. Produced by Rodgers and Hammerstein, the play opened on Broadway in October 1950 and closed after 13 performances, a flop.

When Steinbeck found out that there was interest in turning Cannery Row into a Broadway musical, he wrote Sweet Thursday as a more Broadway-friendly piece. Eventually, Rodgers and Hammerstein became interested in it after Frank Loesser turned the property down.

Its origins as a pitch for a musical may explain some of the differences in the lead character of Mack between the two novels. In Sweet Thursday, Mack repeats snippets of poetry and whimsy, and he sings a melody that are out of character with the Mack of 1945's Cannery Row.

== Synopsis ==
Doc returns to a failed Western Biological Laboratories and a changed Cannery Row after serving in the army during World War II. Mack and the Boys are still living in the Palace Flophouse, but Lee Chong has sold his general store to Joseph and Mary Rivas. Since the death of its original owner Dora, the local brothel, The Bear Flag Restaurant, is now being run by Dora's older sister Fauna, a former mission worker previously known as Flora. Under Fauna, the girls of the Bear Flag study etiquette and posture with the goal of joining Fauna's list of "gold stars," former employees of the Bear Flag who have married and left their employ there.

As Doc tries to rebuild his neglected business, the latest Bear Flag resident Suzy is causing trouble. Fauna knows Suzy isn't cut out to be a working girl, but her soft heart always causes her to fall for a hard luck story. Deciding to make Suzy one of her gold star girls, Fauna plots to throw Suzy into the arms of an unwitting Doc and enlists the aid of Mack and the Boys.

After a disastrous party hosted by Mack and the Boys, Suzy leaves the Bear Flag, but not to marry Doc. Choosing to live alone, Suzy moves into an empty boiler in a vacant lot and takes a job at the local diner, the Golden Poppy. While Cannery Row is stunned over Suzy's actions and Doc wrestles with a critical project, Hazel, one of the Boys living in the Palace Flophouse, struggles with his own demons. Having been told by Fauna in an astrological reading he will become president of the United States, Hazel fights destiny. To practice for high office, Hazel understands that he must learn to make difficult decisions — one of which is breaking Doc's arm, for he's realized that this, arousing Suzy's sympathy, is the only way to bring the couple together. Realizing Doc's broken arm will keep him from a much-needed collecting expedition, Mack and the Boys teach Suzy to drive a car. Suzy and the injured Doc head to the coast for the collecting expedition.

== History ==
The novel was adapted into the 1955 Rodgers and Hammerstein Broadway musical Pipe Dream, which was nominated for nine Tony Awards but which was one of their unsuccessful shows, only lasting as long as the pre-reviews, advance ticket sale, a first for one of their musicals. In 2011, Smithsonian Magazine ranked it among the ten all-time Broadway flops.

The movie version of the book's predecessor, Cannery Row, incorporates several of the story lines in Sweet Thursday.

== Reception ==
According to Steinbeck biographer Jay Parini, "It is often said reviewers hated the novel, but a close survey of the actual notices suggests the novel received, on balance, a favorable response, with many reviewers finding something to admire in its pages."

== Characters ==
Doc is a marine biologist who runs a biological specimens business, Western Biological Laboratories, who collects, prepares and markets specimens of fish and mammals for research and dissection. He is back from World War II and is feeling melancholy and lonely when he launches into research of octopii.

Suzy is a young woman from San Francisco who arrives in Monterey via the bus and goes to work briefly as a prostitute at the Bear Flag Restaurant, Monterey's most prominent bordello. She winds up working at a diner and living in an abandoned boiler, the latter having figured in Cannery Row as the home of a married couple. Her and Doc eventually falling in love is the crux of the story.

Mack is the de facto leader of a group of formerly homeless men who live in a shack on Cannery Row. The post-War Mack is more philosophical and has a more literary bent than did the Mack of Cannery Row, indicating the character's evolution as a musical comedy character.

Hazel, a simple minded but good hearted-young man who sometimes goes on marine specimen hunting trips with Doc, is the most prominent of Mack's boys who hunker down at the Palace Flophouse. His horoscope and the fact that he has only four toes on one foot forecasts that Hazel will one day be President of the United States.

Fauna, the sister of Dora Flood of Cannery Row, takes over the Bear Flag Restaurant. She is much like Dora, except she has interest in astrology and is dedicated to making matches for her girls with prominent citizens.

Joseph and Mary Riva is the Mexican-American owner of the grocery store once owned by Lee Chong, who has returned to China. In addition to running the store, Joseph is a labor contractor for undocumented workers from Mexico and serves as an agent for his nephew's salsa band. He is perceived as a rival for Suzy by Doc.

=== Inspiration for the characters ===
Doc was based on Steinbeck's friend Ed Ricketts, a marine biologist and entrepreneur.

Mack was based on Cannery Row denizen Harold Otis "Gabe" Bicknell. A photo of Bicknell was used on the cover of the 1994 paperback edition of the novel.

Bear Flag Restaurant owner and madam Fauna Flood, as was her sister Dora in the Cannery Row were based on Flora Woods Adams, a bordello owner who also figures in Steinbeck's earlier novel Tortilla Flat and in East of Eden.

Wide Ida, the proprietor of La Ida Cafe, was based on Edith Luciani, a prostitute from San Francisco who ran the Row's second busiest bordello, which was owned by Woods. In both this novel and Cannery Row, La Ida Cafe is not a bordello, unlike the real establishment it was based on. Bicknell and McLean occasionally worked for Luciani, as Mack and Eddie did for Wide Ida in the novel.

== Musical references ==
- In 1960 Duke Ellington and Billy Strayhorn wrote and recorded Suite Thursday inspired by the Steinbeck novel and dedicated to the author.
- The song "Sweet Thursday" from California singer/songwriter Matt Costa's 2006 release Songs We Sing is an allusion to the work. The song also incorporates aspects of other Steinbeck works including Tortilla Flat (1935) and The Grapes of Wrath (1939).
- British supergroup Sweet Thursday (band) named themselves after the novel.
- A famous Danish rock band, tv•2, named its sixth album after the Danish title of the novel: En Dejlig Torsdag (1987)
