= Steinbeck in Vietnam =

2012 autobiographical book written by John Steinbeck

Steinbeck in Vietnam: Dispatches from the War is an autobiographical book written by John Steinbeck, laureate of Nobel Prize in Literature and Pulitzer Prize for Fiction, edited by Thomas E. Barden and published by University of Virginia Press on 29 March 2012.

== Critical reception and reviews ==
David Willson of Vietnam Veterans of America wrote "I recommend Steinbeck in Vietnam to Vietnam War-oriented readers.",

The book has been also reviewed by Charles Lariomore Etheridge of Texas A&M University–Corpus Christi, an editor of World History Group and Anthony Marro of Newsday.
