= Cannery Row (film) =

1982 film by David S. Ward

- Theatrical release poster by John Solie
- Directed by: David S. Ward
- Screenplay by: David S. Ward; William Graham
- Based on: Cannery Row; Sweet Thursday by John Steinbeck
- Produced by: Michael Phillips
- Starring: Nick Nolte; Debra Winger; Audra Lindley; John Huston
- Cinematography: Sven Nykvist
- Edited by: David Bretherton
- Music by: Jack Nitzsche
- Production companies: Metro-Goldwyn-Mayer; Chai Productions
- Distributed by: MGM/UA Entertainment Co.
- Release date: February 12, 1982 (United States)
- Running time: 120 minutes
- Country: United States
- Language: English
- Budget: $11.5 million
- Box office: $1.8 million or $5.3 million

Cannery Row is a 1982 American comedy-drama film directed by David S. Ward in his directorial debut, starring Nick Nolte and Debra Winger. The movie is adapted from John Steinbeck's novels Cannery Row (1945) and Sweet Thursday (1954).

== Plot ==
During World War II, declining fish stocks lead to the shutdown of the fishing and canning industry in Monterey, California. The bums and prostitutes living on the city's skid row lead colorful and adventurous lives in a balmy seaside setting. Eddie "Doc" Daniels, a self-employed marine biologist, lives in a dockside warehouse and researches octopuses. Suzy DeSoto works at the local bordello only out of necessity.

A collection of linked vignettes describes life on Cannery Row. It is depicted as an impoverished area inhabited by a motley band of people who have experienced failures, but somehow have found their niche among strangely kindred souls. Doc and Suzy do not quite fit in, but are accepted. Mack and the boys gather frogs and sell them to give a surprise party for Doc, which turns into a brawl and breaks the tank housing Doc's octopus collection. To make amends, they decide to gift him with a microscope, but mistakenly purchase a telescope.

A deeper mystery revolves around why Doc stays in Cannery Row. Suzy discovers that Doc was once a professional baseball pitcher but quit. Another character, Maxie Baker - known locally as "The Seer" - spends his days playing his trumpet on the beach. He depends on the gifts that mysteriously appear, such as groceries. Suzy eventually learns that the Seer is a former baseball player whom Doc injured with a pitch to the head; Doc has been looking after him. Doc and Suzy ultimately find love.

== Cast ==
- Nick Nolte as Doc Eddie Daniels
- Debra Winger as Suzy DeSoto
- Audra Lindley as Fauna Flood
- M. Emmet Walsh as Mack
- Tom Mahoney as Hughie
- John Malloy as Jones
- James Keane as Eddie
- Sunshine Parker as Maxie "The Seer" Baker
- Rosanna DeSoto as Ellen Sedgewick
- Frank McRae as Hazel
- Santos Morales as Joseph and Mary Rivas
- Anne Lockhart as Barmaid
- John Huston as Narrator
- Kathleen Doyle as Violet

== Production ==
Otto Preminger was going to make a film version of the novel from a script by Wendell Mayes but the projected ended after difficulties over the rights.

Raquel Welch was originally cast as Suzy DeSoto but was fired after the first few days of production and replaced by actress Debra Winger, who was 15 years her junior. Welch sued the filmmakers for breach of contract. In the case, MGM claimed Welch was fired for being a "temperamental actress" whose behavior caused the film to go overbudget. She insisted on doing her hair and make-up at home, and would refuse to co-operate with the director David S. Ward or producers unless she got her own way, thus breaching her $250,000 pay or play contract herself. Welch won the case, and was awarded a reported settlement of $10.8 million in court in 1986. The judgement was upheld at an appeal in 1990, but the whole affair tarnished Welch's reputation in Hollywood. After launching her lawsuit, Welch was never offered another starring role in a major motion picture again. Second unit filming took place in San Diego, California.

== Reception ==
=== Critical reception ===
In his two-and-a-half star review, Chicago Sun-Times film critic Roger Ebert wrote of the film: "The movie is almost always good to look at, thanks to Richard MacDonald's sets (he linked together two giant sound stages) and Sven Nykvist's photography. And Nolte and Winger are almost able to make their relationship work, if only it didn't seem scripted out of old country songs and lonely hearts columns. It's tough to pull off a movie like this, in the semi-cynical 1980s (it would have been impossible in the truly cynical seventies). I guess we no longer believe in the essential heroism of the little guy, and in the proposition that anyone can succeed with a little luck." Vincent Canby of The New York Times dubbed the film "precious nonsense" and felt it was a poor adaptation of John Steinbeck's novels Cannery Row and Sweet Thursday. Variety praised Nolte and Winger's performance, but felt the material was not up to them.

Cannery Row holds a 75% rating on Rotten Tomatoes film review aggregator based on eight reviews by critics.

=== MGM reaction ===
MGM head of production David Begelman later said he should not have greenlit the film, saying it "was beyond the reach of the filmmaker to realize the wonderful, wonderful values he had in a brilliant script."
