= Tortilla Flat (film) =

1942 film by Victor Fleming

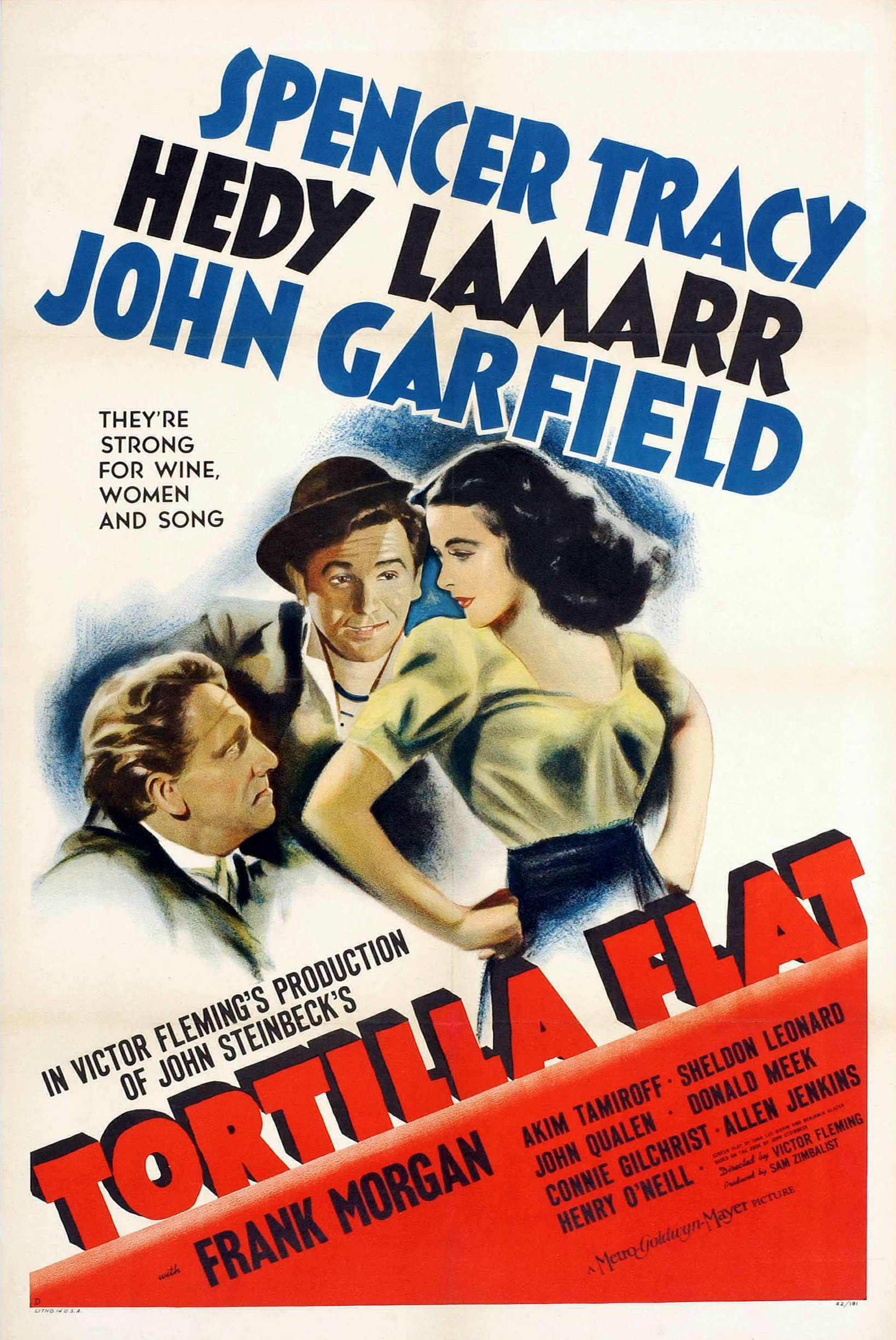
- Theatrical release poster
- Directed by: Victor Fleming
- Screenplay by: John Lee Mahin; Benjamin Glazer
- Based on: Tortilla Flat; 1935 novel by John Steinbeck
- Produced by: Sam Zimbalist
- Starring: Spencer Tracy; Hedy Lamarr; John Garfield; Frank Morgan; Akim Tamiroff
- Cinematography: Karl W. Freund
- Edited by: James E. Newcom; Robert Kern
- Music by: Frank Loesser; Franz Waxman
- Production company: Metro-Goldwyn-Mayer
- Distributed by: Loew's Inc.
- Release date: May 21, 1942 (United States)
- Running time: 105 minutes
- Country: United States
- Language: English
- Budget: $1,201,000
- Box office: $2,611,000

Tortilla Flat is a 1942 American romantic comedy film directed by Victor Fleming and starring Spencer Tracy, Hedy Lamarr, John Garfield, Frank Morgan, Akim Tamiroff and Sheldon Leonard, based on the 1935 novel of the same name by John Steinbeck. Frank Morgan received an Academy Award nomination for Best Supporting Actor for his poignant portrayal of The Pirate.

== Plot ==
Danny inherits two houses in the central coastal area of California, "just outside the old seaport town of Monterey", So Pilon and his poor, idle friends move in. One of them, the Pirate, is saving money that Pilon endeavors to steal, until he discovers that it is being collected to purchase a golden candlestick that Pirate intends to burn to honor St. Francis, for healing his sick dog, that later is run over and killed. One of Danny's houses burns down, so he allows his friends to move into the other house with him, and in gratitude Pilon tries to make life better for his friend. Things are fine at first, until Danny's passion for a lovely girl named Dolores causes him to actually go to work in a fishing business. A misunderstanding caused by Pilon about a vacuum cleaner that Danny had bought for the girl enrages Danny; he becomes drunk and a bit crazy. He almost dies in an accident while interrupting the girl at her work in a cannery, but through Pilon's prayers, is restored to health. Danny marries his sweetheart, with the promise that he will become a fisherman, now that Pilon has raised the money to buy a boat. The movie's happy ending is different from the novel's ending, in which Danny dies after a fall.

== Cast ==
- Spencer Tracy as Pilon
- Hedy Lamarr as Dolores Sweets Ramirez
- John Garfield as Daniel Alvarez
- Frank Morgan as The Pirate
- Akim Tamiroff as Pablo
- Sheldon Leonard as Tito Ralph
- John Qualen as José Maria Corcoran
- Donald Meek as Paul D. Cummings
- Connie Gilchrist as Mrs. Torelli
- Allen Jenkins as Big Joe Portagee
- Henry O'Neill as Father Juan Ramon
- Mercedes Ruffino as Mrs. Marellis
- Nina Campana as Señora Teresina Cortez
- Arthur Space as Mr. Brown
- Betty Wells as Cesca
- Harry Burns as Torelli
- Terry (Toto) as Dog

== Reception ==
According to MGM records, the film earned $1,865,000 at the US and Canadian box office, and $746,000 elsewhere, for a profit of $542,000.

=== Critical response ===
Film critic Bosley Crowther of The New York Times gave the film a positive review, writing that the film "is really a little idyll which turns its back on a workaday world...it is filled with solid humor and compassion—and that is pleasant, even for folks who have to work".

== Awards ==
=== Nominations ===
- Best Supporting Actor - Frank Morgan
