= John Steinbeck =

American writer and novelist (1902–1968)

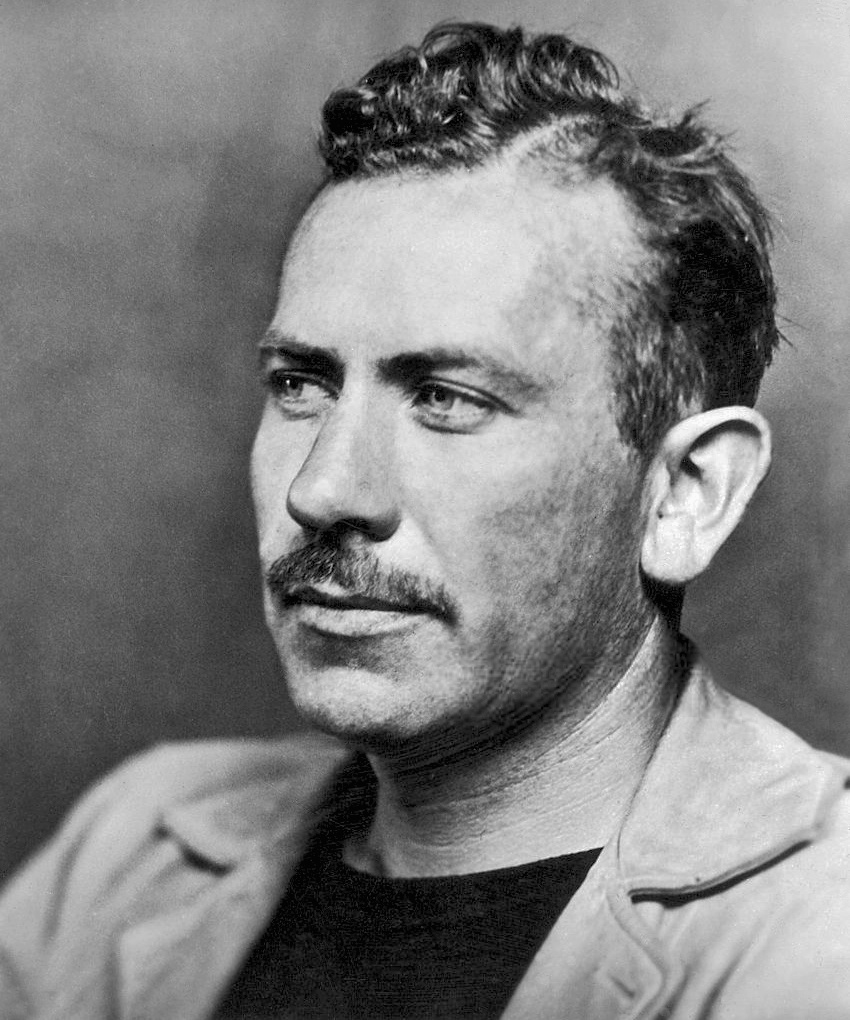
- Steinbeck in 1939
- Born: John Ernst Steinbeck III; February 27, 1902; Salinas, California, U.S.
- Died: December 20, 1968 (aged 66); Manhattan, New York City, U.S.
- Resting place: Garden of Memories Memorial Park Cemetery, Salinas, California
- Education: Stanford University
- Occupations: Novelist; short story writer; war correspondent
- Spouses: Carol Henning (m. 1930; div. 1943) Gwyn Conger (m. 1943; div. 1948) Elaine Scott (m. 1950)
- Children: Thom, John IV
- Writing career
- Notable works: Of Mice and Men (1937); The Grapes of Wrath (1939); East of Eden (1952)
- Notable awards: Pulitzer Prize for Fiction (1940); Nobel Prize in Literature (1962)

John Ernst Steinbeck (/ˈstaɪnbɛk/ STYNE-bek; February 27, 1902 – December 20, 1968) was an American writer and novelist. He was awarded the 1962 Nobel Prize in Literature "for his realistic and imaginative writings, combining as they do sympathetic humor and keen social perception". He has been called "a giant of American letters". One of the most widely read authors of the 20th century, he was also an independent journalist and war correspondent during World War II and the Vietnam War.

During his writing career, he authored 33 books, with one book coauthored alongside Edward Ricketts, including 16 novels, 6 non-fiction books, and 2 collections of short stories. He is widely known for the comic novels Tortilla Flat (1935) and Cannery Row (1945), the epic East of Eden (1952), and the novellas The Red Pony (1933) and Of Mice and Men (1937). The Pulitzer Prize–winning The Grapes of Wrath (1939) is considered Steinbeck's masterpiece and part of the American literary canon. By the 75th anniversary of its publishing date, it had sold 14 million copies.

Much of Steinbeck's work employs settings in his native central California, particularly in the Salinas Valley and the California Coast Ranges region. His works frequently explored the themes of fate and injustice, especially as applied to downtrodden or everyman protagonists. He was awarded with the Presidential Medal of Freedom from Lyndon B. Johnson in 1964 and was nominated for three Academy Awards.

== Early life ==
Steinbeck was born on February 27, 1902, in Salinas, California. He was of German, English, and Irish descent. Johann Adolf Großsteinbeck (1828–1913), Steinbeck's paternal grandfather, was a founder of Mount Hope, a short-lived farming colony in Palestine that disbanded after Arab attackers killed his brother and raped his brother's wife and mother-in-law. He arrived in the United States in 1858, shortening the family name to Steinbeck. The family farm in Heiligenhaus, Mettmann, Germany, is still named "Großsteinbeck".

His father, John Ernst Steinbeck (1862–1935), served as Monterey County treasurer. John's mother, Olive "Ollie" Hamilton (1867–1934), met Steinbeck’s father in King City, California, in the 1890s where his father became one of town’s first residents having moved there to work as the first station agent and manager for the Sperry Flour Mill and where his mother worked as a local schoolteacher, sharing the same passion as Steinbeck for literature, his grandfather Samuel Hamilton was born in Ballykelly, County Londonderry, Ireland (then Ulster), and emigrated to the United States arriving in California, where he lived on a ranch eight miles east of King City. The character Samuel Hamilton in his grandson's novel East of Eden is based on him. The Steinbecks were members of the Episcopal Church, although Steinbeck later became agnostic. Steinbeck lived in the Salinas Valley, about 25 miles from the Pacific Coast. Both valley and coast would serve as settings for some of his best fiction. He spent his summers working on nearby ranches including the Post Ranch in Big Sur. He later labored with migrant workers on Spreckels sugar beet farms. There he learned of the harsher aspects of the migrant life and the darker side of human nature, which supplied him with material expressed in Of Mice and Men. He explored his surroundings, walking across local forests, fields, and farms. While working at Spreckels Sugar Company, he sometimes worked in their laboratory, which gave him time to write. He had considerable mechanical aptitude and fondness for repairing things he owned.

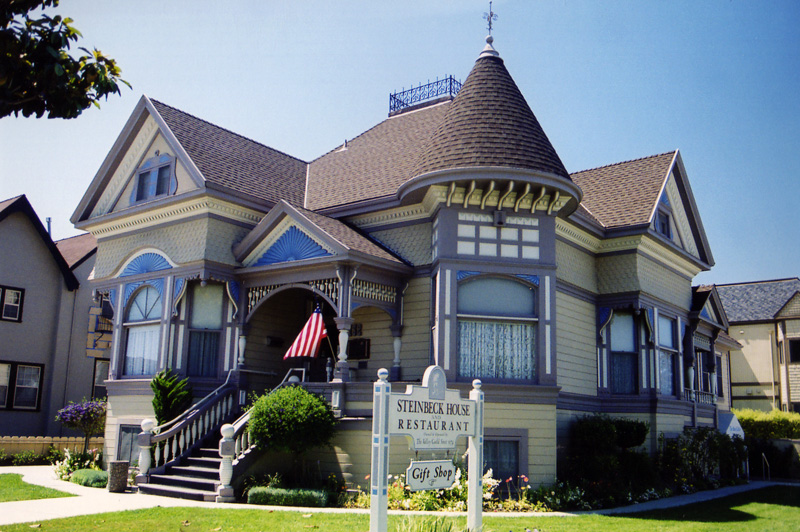
The Steinbeck House at 132 Central Avenue, Salinas, California, the Victorian home where Steinbeck spent his childhood

Steinbeck graduated from Salinas High School in 1919 and went on to study English literature at Stanford University near Palo Alto, leaving without a degree in 1925. He traveled to New York City where he took odd jobs while trying to write. When he failed to publish his work, he returned to California and worked in 1928 as a tour guide and caretaker at Lake Tahoe, where he met Carol Henning, his first wife. They married in January 1930 in Los Angeles, where, with friends, he attempted to make money by manufacturing plaster mannequins.

When their money ran out six months later due to a slow market, Steinbeck and Carol moved back to Pacific Grove, California, to a cottage owned by his father, on the Monterey Peninsula a few blocks outside the Monterey city limits. The elder Steinbecks gave John free housing, paper for his manuscripts, and from 1928, loans that allowed him to write without looking for work. During the Great Depression, Steinbeck bought a small boat, and later claimed that he was able to live on the fish and crabs that he gathered from the sea, and fresh vegetables from his garden and local farms. When those sources failed, Steinbeck and his wife accepted welfare, and on rare occasions, stole bacon from the local produce market. Whatever food they had, they shared with their friends. Carol became the model for Mary Talbot in Steinbeck's novel Cannery Row.

In 1930, Steinbeck met the marine biologist Ed Ricketts in Monterey, California, who became a close friend and mentor to Steinbeck during the following decade, teaching him a great deal about philosophy and biology. Ricketts was very quiet yet likable, with an encyclopedic knowledge of diverse subjects, and became a focus of Steinbeck's attention. Ricketts operated a biological lab on the coast of Monterey, selling biological samples of small animals, fish, rays, starfish, turtles, and other marine forms to schools and colleges. Between 1930 and 1936, Steinbeck and Ricketts became close friends, and Steinbeck's wife Carol began working at the lab as secretary-bookkeeper. Steinbeck helped on an informal basis. They formed a common bond based on their love of music and art, and Steinbeck learned biology and Ricketts's ecological philosophy. When Steinbeck became emotionally upset, Ricketts sometimes played music for him.

== Career ==
=== Writing ===
Steinbeck's first novel, Cup of Gold, was published in 1929. In 1930, Steinbeck wrote a werewolf murder mystery, Murder at Full Moon, that has never been published because Steinbeck considered it unworthy of publication. The Pastures of Heaven was published in 1932, and consisted of twelve interconnected stories set in Corral de Tierra which was discovered by a Spanish corporal who was chasing runaway Indian slaves. To a God Unknown was published in 1933.

Steinbeck achieved his first critical success when Tortilla Flat was published in 1935. Before Tortilla Flat was published, Steinbeck was an obscure writer "with little success." The novel was set in post-war Monterey, California and won the California Commonwealth Club's gold medal. In the New York Times, the book was described as "a sunny, warmhearted , amoral and slightly scandalous chronicle." The novel portrays the adventures of a group of young men living in Monterey after World War I, just before U.S. prohibition. They are portrayed in ironic comparison to mythic knights on a quest and reject many social mores of American society in enjoyment of a dissolute life devoted to wine, lust, camaraderie and petty theft. Tortilla Flat was adapted as a 1942 film of the same name, starring Spencer Tracy, Hedy Lamarr and John Garfield, a friend of Steinbeck. With some of the proceeds, he built a summer ranch-home in Los Gatos, California.

Steinbeck began to write a series of "California novels" and Dust Bowl fiction, set among common people during the Great Depression. These included In Dubious Battle, Of Mice and Men and The Grapes of Wrath. He also wrote an article series called The Harvest Gypsies for the San Francisco News about the plight of the migrant worker.

Of Mice and Men was a novella about the dreams of two migrant agricultural laborers in California. It was published in 1937 to critical acclaim. Steinbeck's 1962 Nobel Prize citation called it a "little masterpiece." Steinbeck, on vacations to Mexico, witnessed sold-out theater troupes performing for poor and illiterate workers, and wrote Of Mice and Men with a stage play in mind.

The stage production was a hit, starring Wallace Ford as George and Broderick Crawford as George's companion, the mentally childlike, but physically powerful itinerant farmhand Lennie. Steinbeck refused to travel from his home in California to attend any performance of the play during its New York run, telling director George S. Kaufman that the play as it existed in his own mind was "perfect" and that anything presented on stage would only be a disappointment. Steinbeck wrote two more stage plays (The Moon Is Down and Burning Bright).

Of Mice and Men was also adapted as a 1939 Hollywood film, with Lon Chaney Jr. as Lennie and Burgess Meredith as George. Chaney had also filled the role in the Los Angeles stage production. Meredith and Steinbeck became close friends for the next two decades. Another film based on the novella was made in 1992 starring Gary Sinise as George and John Malkovich as Lennie.

In August 1936, the San Francisco News asked Steinbeck to personally interview multiple families in the impoverished Hoovervilles of the San Joaquin Valley. As Steinbeck visited the slums that hugged the highways across the Central Valley, he was harrowed by what he saw. In 1939, Steinbeck published The Grapes of Wrath based on his observations and experiences. The novel is commonly considered to be his greatest work. According to The New York Times, it was the best-selling book of 1939, and 430,000 copies had been printed by February 1940. In that month, it won the National Book Award, favorite fiction book of 1939, voted by members of the American Booksellers Association. Later that year, it won the Pulitzer Prize for Fiction and was adapted as a film directed by John Ford, starring Henry Fonda as Tom Joad; Fonda was nominated for the best actor Academy Award.

Grapes of Wrath reflects Steinbeck's New Deal political views, negative portrayal of aspects of capitalism, and sympathy for the plight of workers, which led to backlash against him, especially in his hometown of Salinas. Steinbeck received so many threats that he purchased a handgun for his safety. Claiming the book was obscene and misrepresented the county, the Kern County Board of Supervisors banned the book from the county's public schools and libraries in August 1939. This ban lasted until January 1941.

Of the controversy, Steinbeck wrote, "The vilification of me out here from the large landowners and bankers is pretty bad. The latest is a rumor started by them that the Okies hate me and have threatened to kill me for lying about them. I'm frightened at the rolling might of this damned thing. It is completely out of hand; I mean a kind of hysteria about the book is growing that is not healthy."

The then first lady Eleanor Roosevelt, a fan of Of Mice and Men, defended Steinbeck's work in her nationally syndicated newspaper column, "My Day." She described the novel as "an unforgettable experience in reading... [it] both repels and attracts you. The horrors of the picture, so well drawn, make you dread sometimes to begin the next chapter, and yet you cannot lay the book down or even skip a page." After visiting California labor camps in 1940, she was asked if she believed the novel was exaggerated. Roosevelt responded, "I have never believed that The Grapes of Wrath was exaggerated."

=== Ed Ricketts ===
In the 1930s and 1940s, Ed Ricketts strongly influenced Steinbeck's writing. Steinbeck frequently took small trips with Ricketts along the California coast to give himself time off from his writing and to collect biological specimens, which Ricketts sold for a living. Their coauthored book, Sea of Cortez (December 1941), about a collecting expedition to the Gulf of California in 1940, which was part travelogue and part natural history, published just as the U.S. entered World War II, never found an audience and did not sell well. However, in 1951, Steinbeck republished the narrative portion of the book as The Log from the Sea of Cortez, under his name only (though Ricketts had written some of it). This work remains in print today.

Although Carol accompanied Steinbeck on the trip, their marriage was beginning to suffer, and ended a year later, in 1941, even as Steinbeck worked on the manuscript for the book. In 1942, after his divorce from Carol he married Gwyndolyn "Gwyn" Conger.

Ricketts was Steinbeck's model for the character of "Doc" in Cannery Row (1945) and Sweet Thursday (1954), "Friend Ed" in Burning Bright, and characters in In Dubious Battle (1936) and The Grapes of Wrath (1939). Ecological themes recur in Steinbeck's novels of the period.

Steinbeck's close relations with Ricketts ended in 1941 when Steinbeck moved away from Pacific Grove and divorced his wife Carol. Ricketts's biographer Eric Enno Tamm opined that, except for East of Eden (1952), Steinbeck's writing declined after Ricketts's untimely death in 1948.

=== World War II ===
Steinbeck's novel The Moon Is Down (1942), about the Socrates-inspired spirit of resistance in an occupied village in Northern Europe, was made into a film almost immediately. It was presumed that the unnamed country of the novel was Norway and the occupiers the Germans. In 1945, Steinbeck received the King Haakon VII Freedom Cross for his literary contributions to the Norwegian resistance movement.

In 1943, Steinbeck served as a World War II war correspondent for the New York Herald Tribune and worked with the Office of Strategic Services (predecessor of the CIA). It was at that time he became friends with Will Lang Jr. of Time/Life magazine. During the war, Steinbeck accompanied the commando raids of Douglas Fairbanks Jr.'s Beach Jumpers program, which launched small-unit diversion operations against German-held islands in the Mediterranean. At one point, he accompanied Fairbanks on an invasion of an island off the coast of Italy and used a Thompson submachine gun to help capture Italian and German prisoners. Some of his writings from this period were incorporated in the documentary Once There Was a War (1958).

Steinbeck returned from the war with a number of wounds from shrapnel and some psychological trauma. He treated himself, as ever, by writing. He wrote Alfred Hitchcock's movie, Lifeboat (1944), and with screenwriter Jack Wagner, A Medal for Benny (1945), about paisanos from Tortilla Flat going to war. He later requested that his name be removed from the credits of Lifeboat, because he believed the final version of the film had racist undertones. In 1944, bruised, battered, and homesick, Steinbeck wrote Cannery Row (1945), a love letter to the city of Monterey. In 1958, Ocean View Avenue in Monterey, the setting of the book, was renamed Cannery Row in his honor.

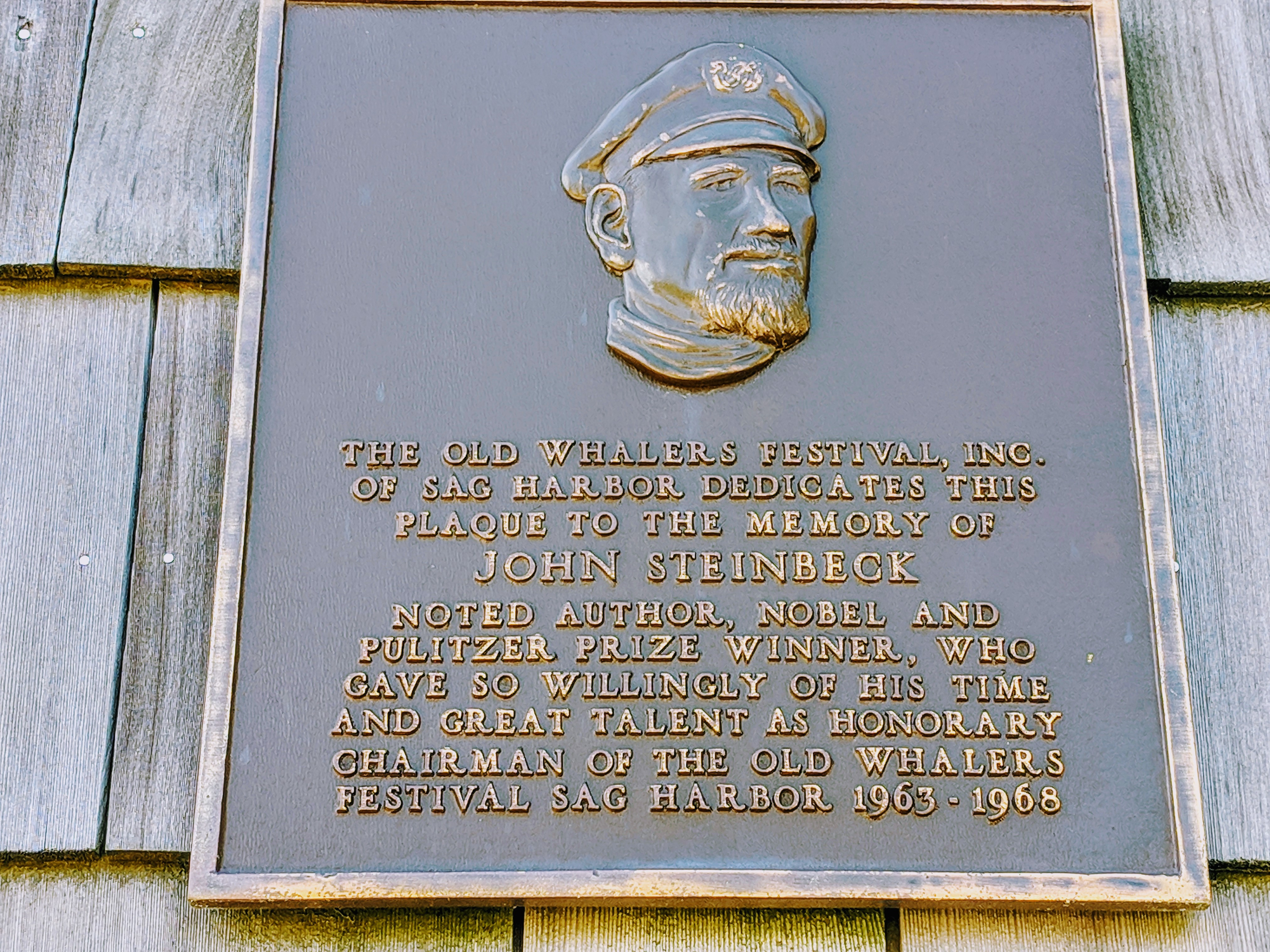
John Steinbeck plaque in Sag Harbor, N.Y. (20180916 151050)

After the war, he wrote The Pearl (1947), knowing it would be filmed eventually. Steinbeck's relationship with Hollywood had solidified to the point where his books were being green-lit as movies as they released. The story first appeared in the December 1945 issue of Woman's Home Companion magazine as "The Pearl of the World". It was illustrated by John Alan Maxwell. The novel is an imaginative telling of a story which Steinbeck had heard in La Paz in 1940, as related in The Log From the Sea of Cortez, which he described in Chapter 11 as being "so much like a parable that it almost can't be". Steinbeck traveled to Cuernavaca, Mexico for the filming with Wagner who helped with the script; on this trip he would be inspired by the story of Emiliano Zapata, and subsequently wrote a film script (Viva Zapata!) directed by Elia Kazan and starring Marlon Brando and Anthony Quinn.

In 1947, Steinbeck made his first trip to the Soviet Union with photographer Robert Capa. They visited Moscow, Kyiv, Tbilisi, Batumi and Stalingrad, some of the first Americans to visit many parts of the USSR since the communist revolution. Steinbeck's 1948 book about their experiences, A Russian Journal, was illustrated with Capa's photos. In 1948, the year the book was published, Steinbeck was elected to the American Academy of Arts and Letters.

=== New York ===
Over the course of 276 days in 1951, Steinbeck wrote the first draft of East of Eden, a book he considered his ultimate test as a writer. He wrote a daily letter to his editor while writing the book. Through them, Steinbeck explored himself, his creative process, his love for writing, and his family life, for he had just married his third wife, Elaine Scott, the year prior. Steinbeck, according to Elaine Scott, considered East of Eden his magnum opus, his greatest novel. As the book was released, he wrote to John Beskow, a Swedish artist and a confidant of his: "I have put all the things I have wanted to write all my life. This is 'the book'... having done this, I can do anything I want". Also in 1952, John Steinbeck appeared as the on-screen narrator of 20th Century Fox's film O. Henry's Full House. Although Steinbeck later admitted he was uncomfortable before the camera, he provided interesting introductions to several filmed adaptations of short stories by the legendary writer O. Henry. About the same time, Steinbeck recorded readings of several of his short stories for Columbia Records; the recordings provide a record of Steinbeck's deep, resonant voice.

Following the success of Viva Zapata!, Steinbeck collaborated with Kazan on the 1955 film East of Eden, James Dean's movie debut. Jack Moffitt of The Hollywood Reporter, in a review that appeared after the March 1955 premiere, wrote "Beautifully acted, and superbly directed by Elia Kazan, it is bound to be one of the year’s important contributions to screen literature."

From March to October 1959, Steinbeck and his third wife Elaine rented a cottage in the hamlet of Discove, Redlynch, near Bruton in Somerset, England, while Steinbeck researched his retelling of the Arthurian legend of King Arthur and the Knights of the Round Table. Glastonbury Tor was visible from the cottage, and Steinbeck also visited the nearby hillfort of Cadbury Castle, the supposed site of King Arthur's court of Camelot. The unfinished manuscript was published after his death in 1976, as The Acts of King Arthur and His Noble Knights. Steinbeck grew up enthralled by the stories of King Arthur, and the Steinbecks recounted the time spent in Somerset as the happiest of their life together.

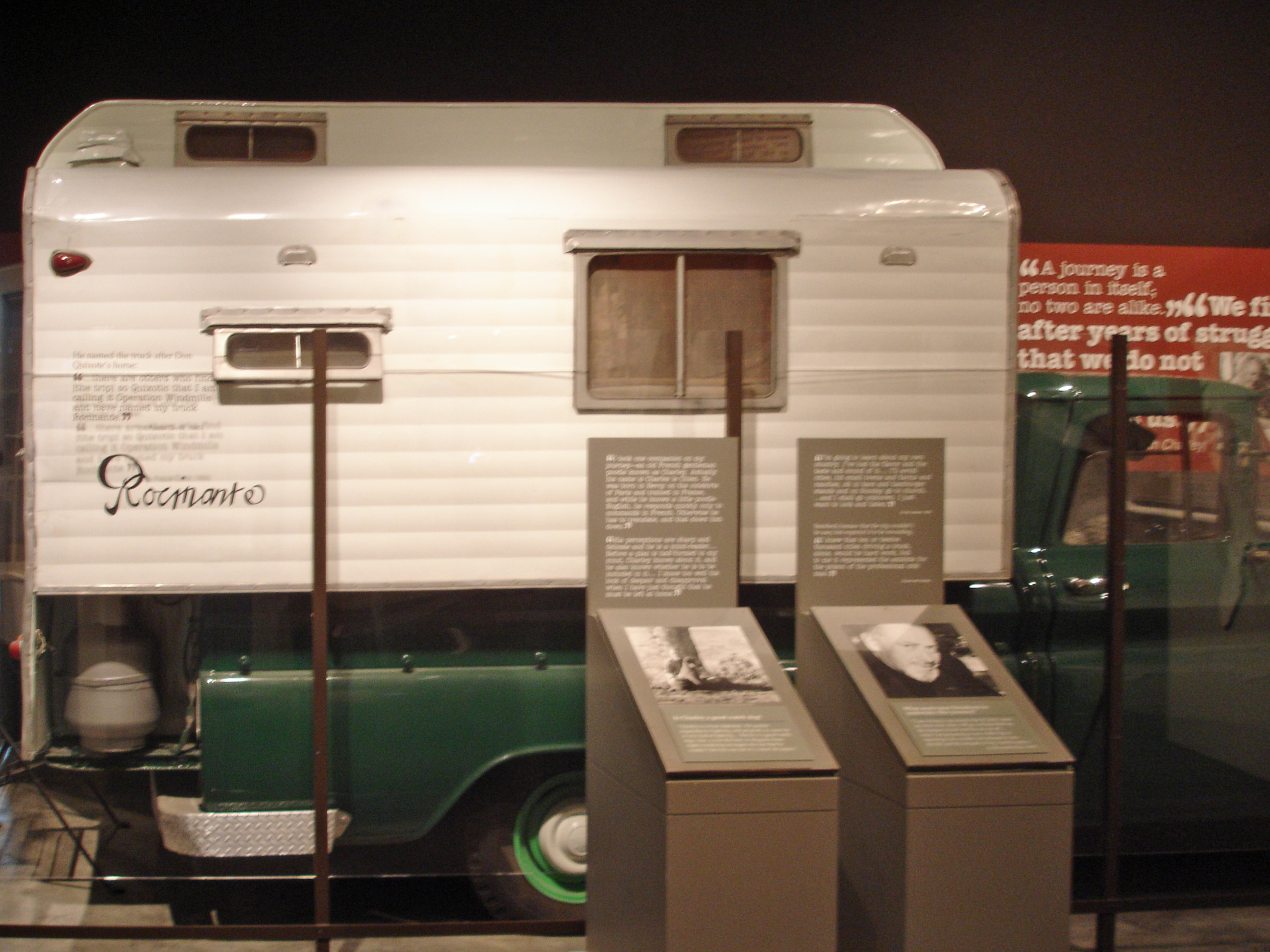
Rocinante, camper truck in which Steinbeck traveled across the United States in 1960

Travels with Charley: In Search of America is a travelogue of his 1960 road trip with his poodle Charley. Steinbeck bemoans his lost youth and roots, while dispensing both criticism and praise for the United States. According to Steinbeck's son Thom, Steinbeck made the journey because he knew he was dying and wanted to see the country one last time.

Steinbeck's last novel, The Winter of Our Discontent (1961), examines moral decline in the United States. The protagonist Ethan grows discontented with his own moral decline and that of those around him. The book has a very different tone from Steinbeck's amoral and ecological stance in earlier works such as Tortilla Flat and Cannery Row. It was not a critical success. Many reviewers recognized the importance of the novel but were disappointed that it was not another Grapes of Wrath. In the Nobel Prize presentation speech the next year, however, the Swedish Academy cited it most favorably: "Here he attained the same standard which he set in The Grapes of Wrath. Again he holds his position as an independent expounder of the truth with an unbiased instinct for what is genuinely American, be it good or bad."

Apparently taken aback by the critical reception of this novel, and the critical outcry when he was awarded the Nobel Prize for Literature in 1962, Steinbeck published no more fiction in the remaining six years before his death.

=== Nobel Prize ===
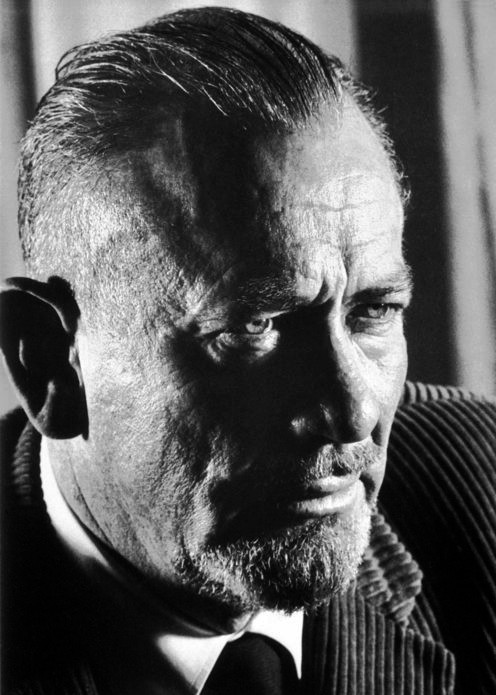
Steinbeck in Sweden during his trip to accept the Nobel Prize for Literature in 1962

In 1962, Steinbeck won the Nobel Prize for literature for his "realistic and imaginative writing, combining as it does sympathetic humor and keen social perception". The selection was heavily criticized, and described as "one of the Academy's biggest mistakes" in one Swedish newspaper. The reaction of American literary critics was also harsh. The New York Times asked why the Nobel committee gave the award to an author whose "limited talent is, in his best books, watered down by tenth-rate philosophising", noting that "[T]he international character of the award and the weight attached to it raise questions about the mechanics of selection and how close the Nobel committee is to the main currents of American writing. ... [W]e think it interesting that the laurel was not awarded to a writer ... whose significance, influence and sheer body of work had already made a more profound impression on the literature of our age". Steinbeck, when asked on the day of the announcement if he deserved the Nobel, replied: "Frankly, no." Biographer Jackson Benson notes, "[T]his honor was one of the few in the world that one could not buy nor gain by political maneuver. It was precisely because the committee made its judgment ... on its own criteria, rather than plugging into 'the main currents of American writing' as defined by the critical establishment, that the award had value." In his acceptance speech later in the year in Stockholm, he said:

the writer is delegated to declare and to celebrate man's proven capacity for greatness of heart and spirit—for gallantry in defeat, for courage, compassion and love. In the endless war against weakness and despair, these are the bright rally flags of hope and of emulation. I hold that a writer who does not believe in the perfectibility of man has no dedication nor any membership in literature.

— Steinbeck Nobel Prize Acceptance Speech

Fifty years later, in 2012, the Nobel Prize opened its archives and it was revealed that Steinbeck was a "compromise choice" among a shortlist consisting of Steinbeck, British authors Robert Graves and Lawrence Durrell, French dramatist Jean Anouilh and Danish author Karen Blixen. The declassified documents showed that he was chosen as the best of a bad lot. "There aren't any obvious candidates for the Nobel prize and the prize committee is in an unenviable situation," wrote committee member Henry Olsson. Although the committee believed Steinbeck's best work was behind him by 1962, committee member Anders Österling believed the release of his novel The Winter of Our Discontent showed that "after some signs of slowing down in recent years, [Steinbeck has] regained his position as a social truth-teller [and is an] authentic realist fully equal to his predecessors Sinclair Lewis and Ernest Hemingway."

Although modest about his own talent as a writer, Steinbeck talked openly of his own admiration of certain writers. In 1953, he wrote that he considered cartoonist Al Capp, creator of the satirical Li'l Abner, "possibly the best writer in the world today". At his own first Nobel Prize press conference he was asked his favorite authors and works and replied: "Hemingway's short stories and nearly everything Faulkner wrote."

In September 1964, President Lyndon B. Johnson awarded Steinbeck the Presidential Medal of Freedom.

In 1967, at the behest of Newsday magazine, Steinbeck went to Vietnam to report on the war. He thought of the Vietnam War as a heroic venture and was considered a hawk for his position on the war. His sons served in Vietnam before his death, and Steinbeck visited one son in the battlefield. At one point he was allowed to man a machine-gun watch position at night at a firebase while his son and other members of his platoon slept.

== Personal life ==
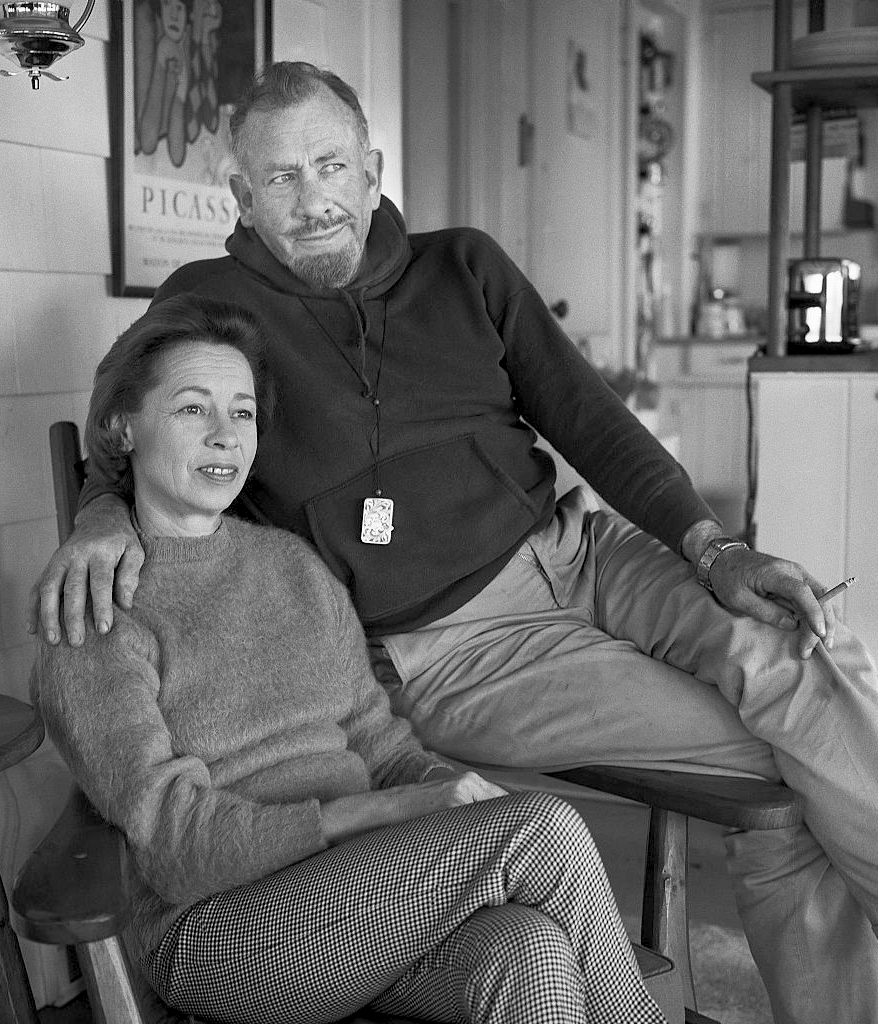
John and Elaine Steinbeck in 1962

Steinbeck and his first wife, Carol Henning, married in January 1930 in Los Angeles. With Henning, who sympathized with feminism, trade unionism, and socialism, he attended political gatherings and study circles, encountering various propagandists, union organizers, and muckrakers. By 1940, their marriage was beginning to suffer, and it ended a year later.

In 1942, after his divorce from Carol, Steinbeck married Gwyndolyn "Gwyn" Conger. With his second wife Steinbeck had two sons, Thomas ("Thom") Myles Steinbeck (1944–2016) and John Steinbeck IV (1946–1991).

In May 1948, Steinbeck returned to Monterey on an emergency trip to be with his friend Ed Ricketts, who had been seriously injured when a train struck his car. Ricketts died hours before Steinbeck arrived. Upon returning home, Steinbeck was confronted by Gwyn, who asked for a divorce, which became final in October. Steinbeck spent the year after Ricketts's death in deep depression.

In June 1949, Steinbeck met stage manager Elaine Scott at a restaurant in Carmel, California. Steinbeck and Scott eventually began a relationship, and in December 1950 they married, within a week of Scott's finalizing her own divorce from actor Zachary Scott. This third marriage for Steinbeck lasted until his death in 1968.

Steinbeck was an acquaintance of modernist poet Robinson Jeffers, a Californian neighbor. In a letter to Elizabeth Otis, Steinbeck wrote: "Robinson Jeffers and his wife came in to call the other day. He looks a little older but that is all. And she is just the same."

In 1962, Steinbeck began acting as friend and mentor to the young writer and naturalist Jack Rudloe, who was trying to establish his own biological supply company, now Gulf Specimen Marine Laboratory in Florida. Their correspondence continued until Steinbeck's death. Steinbeck wrote a letter to his friend George Albee ending their friendship for 12 years.

In February 1966, Steinbeck and his wife traveled to Israel. He met officials, e.g. Teddy Kollek. He visited in Tel Aviv the site of Mount Hope, a farm community established by his grandfather, whose brother, Friedrich Großsteinbeck, had been murdered by Arab locals in 1858 during the Outrages at Jaffa.

== Death ==
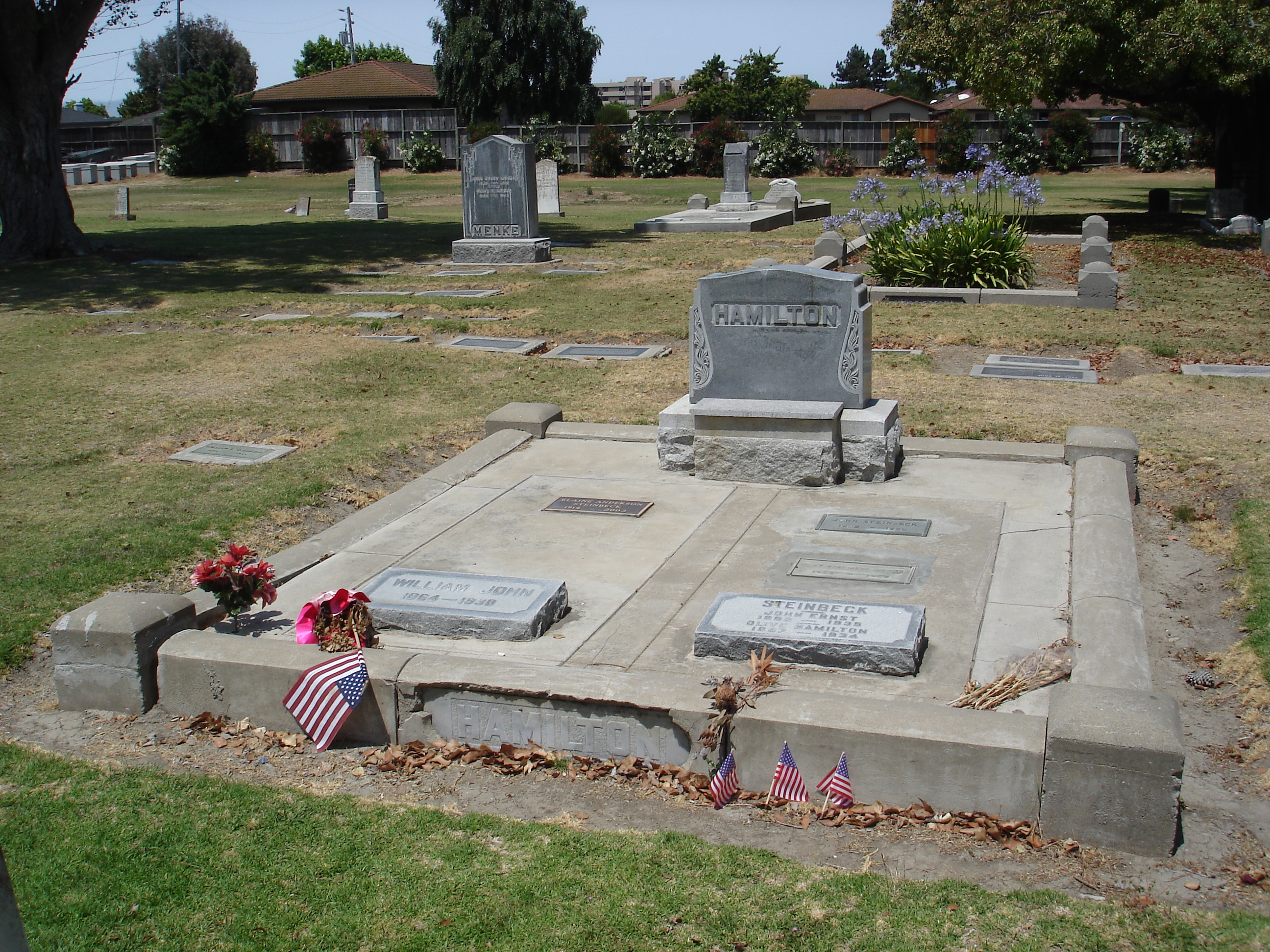
The Steinbeck family graves in the Hamilton plot at the Garden of Memories Memorial Park Cemetery in Salinas, California

John Steinbeck died in Manhattan, New York City, where his writing career had begun, on December 20, 1968, during the 1968 flu pandemic of heart disease and congestive heart failure. He was 66, and had been a lifelong smoker. An autopsy showed nearly complete occlusion of the main coronary arteries.

In accordance with his wishes, his body was cremated, and interred on March 4, 1969 at the Hamilton family gravesite in Salinas, with those of his parents and maternal grandparents. His third wife, Elaine, was buried in the plot in 2004. He had written to his doctor that he felt deeply "in his flesh" that he would not survive his physical death, and that the biological end of his life was the final end to it.

Steinbeck's incomplete novel based on the King Arthur legends of Malory and others, The Acts of King Arthur and His Noble Knights, was published in 1976.

== Legacy ==
Many of Steinbeck's works are required reading in American high schools. In England, Of Mice and Men was one of the key texts used by the examining body AQA for its English Literature GCSE until its removal from the reformed specification that was first examined in June 2018. Following concerns about racist language used in the book, it was also removed from the English Literature GCSE syllabus in Wales, along with To Kill A Mockingbird, by WJEC. It continues to be studied in Northern Ireland, although calls have also been made for its removal there. A study by the Center for the Learning and Teaching of Literature in the United States found that Of Mice and Men was one of the ten most frequently read books in public high schools.

Steinbeck's works have also been banned. The Grapes of Wrath was banned in August 1939 by the Kern County Board of Supervisors from the county's publicly funded schools and libraries. It was burned in Salinas on two occasions. In 2003, a school board in Mississippi banned it on the grounds of profanity. According to the American Library Association, Steinbeck was one of the ten most frequently banned authors from 1990 to 2004, with Of Mice and Men ranking sixth out of 100 such books in the United States.

=== Literary influences ===
Steinbeck grew up in California's Salinas Valley, a culturally diverse place with a rich migratory and immigrant history. This upbringing imparted a regionalistic flavor to his writing, giving many of his works a distinct sense of place. Salinas, Monterey and parts of the San Joaquin Valley were the setting for many of his stories. The area is now sometimes referred to as "Steinbeck Country". Most of his early work dealt with subjects familiar to him from his formative years. An exception was his first novel, Cup of Gold, which concerns the pirate/privateer Henry Morgan, whose adventures had captured Steinbeck's imagination as a child.

In his subsequent novels, Steinbeck found a more authentic voice by drawing upon direct memories of his life in California. His childhood friend, Max Wagner, a brother of Jack Wagner and who later became a film actor, served as inspiration for The Red Pony. Later he used actual American conditions and events in the first half of the 20th century, which he had experienced first-hand as a reporter. Steinbeck often populated his stories with struggling characters; his works examined the lives of the working class and migrant workers during the Dust Bowl and the Great Depression.

His later work reflected his wide range of interests, including marine biology, politics, religion, history and mythology. One of his last published works was Travels with Charley, a travelogue of a road trip he took in 1960 to rediscover America.

=== Commemoration ===
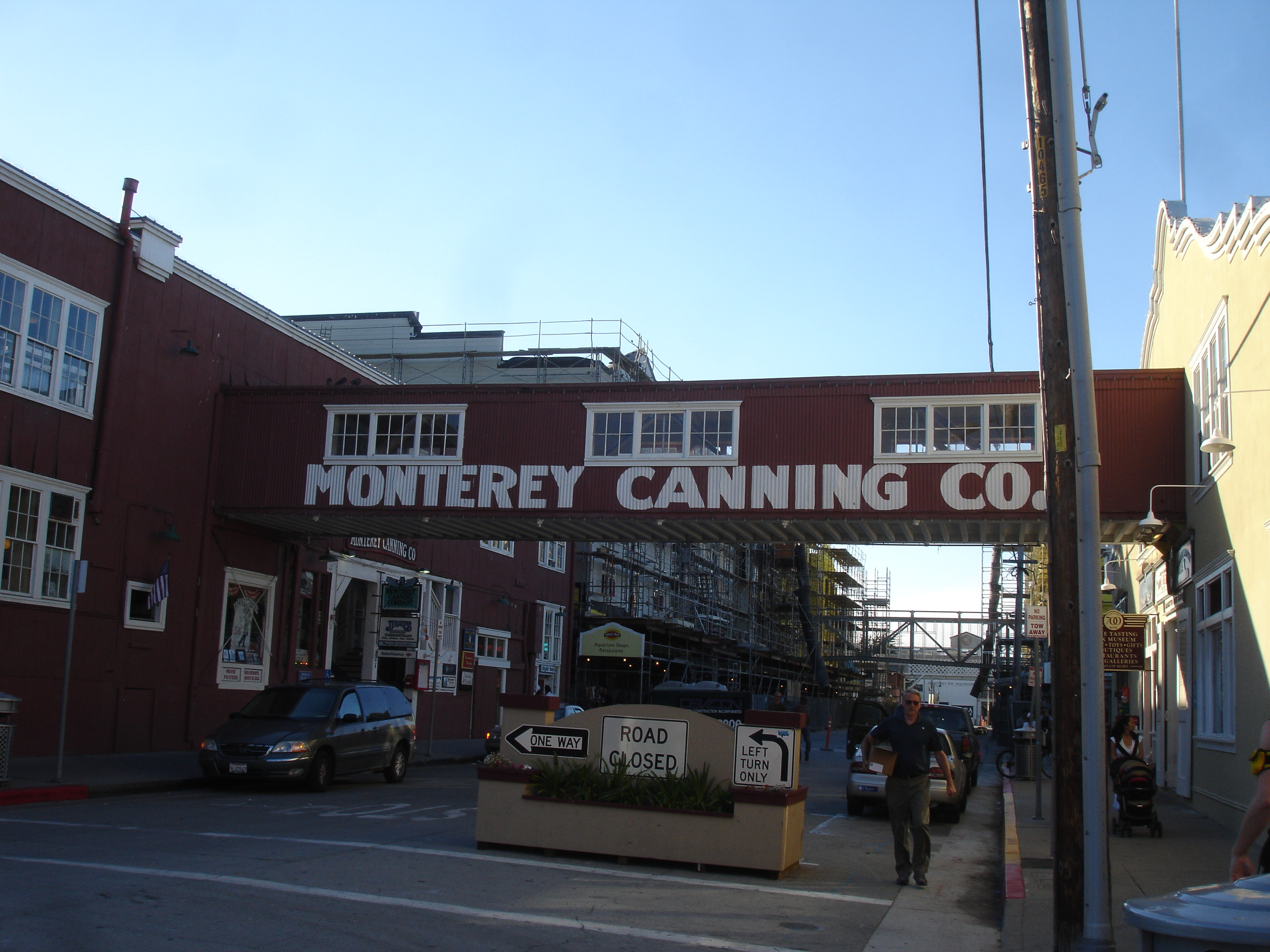
Cannery Row in Monterey

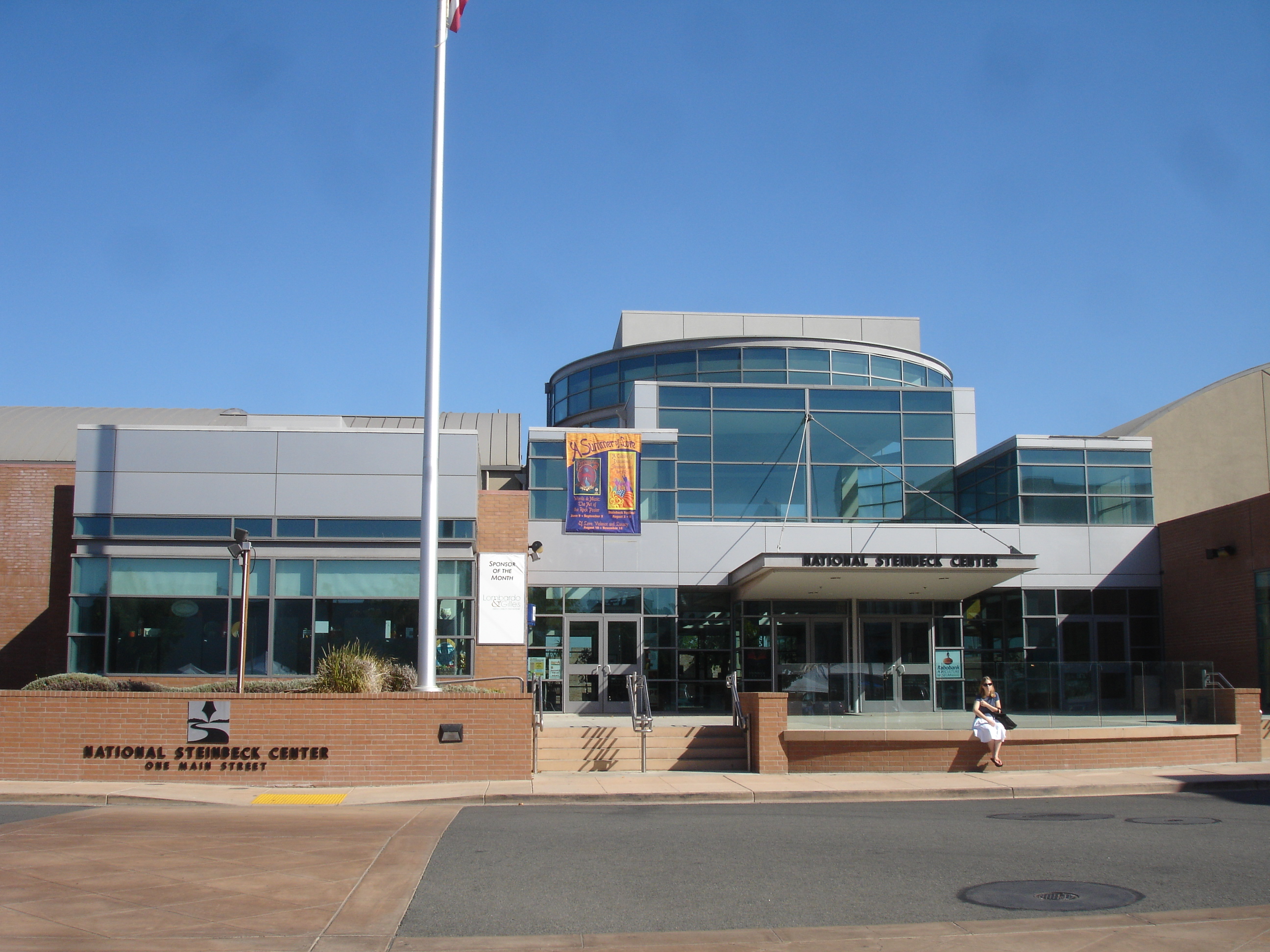
National Steinbeck Center in Salinas, California

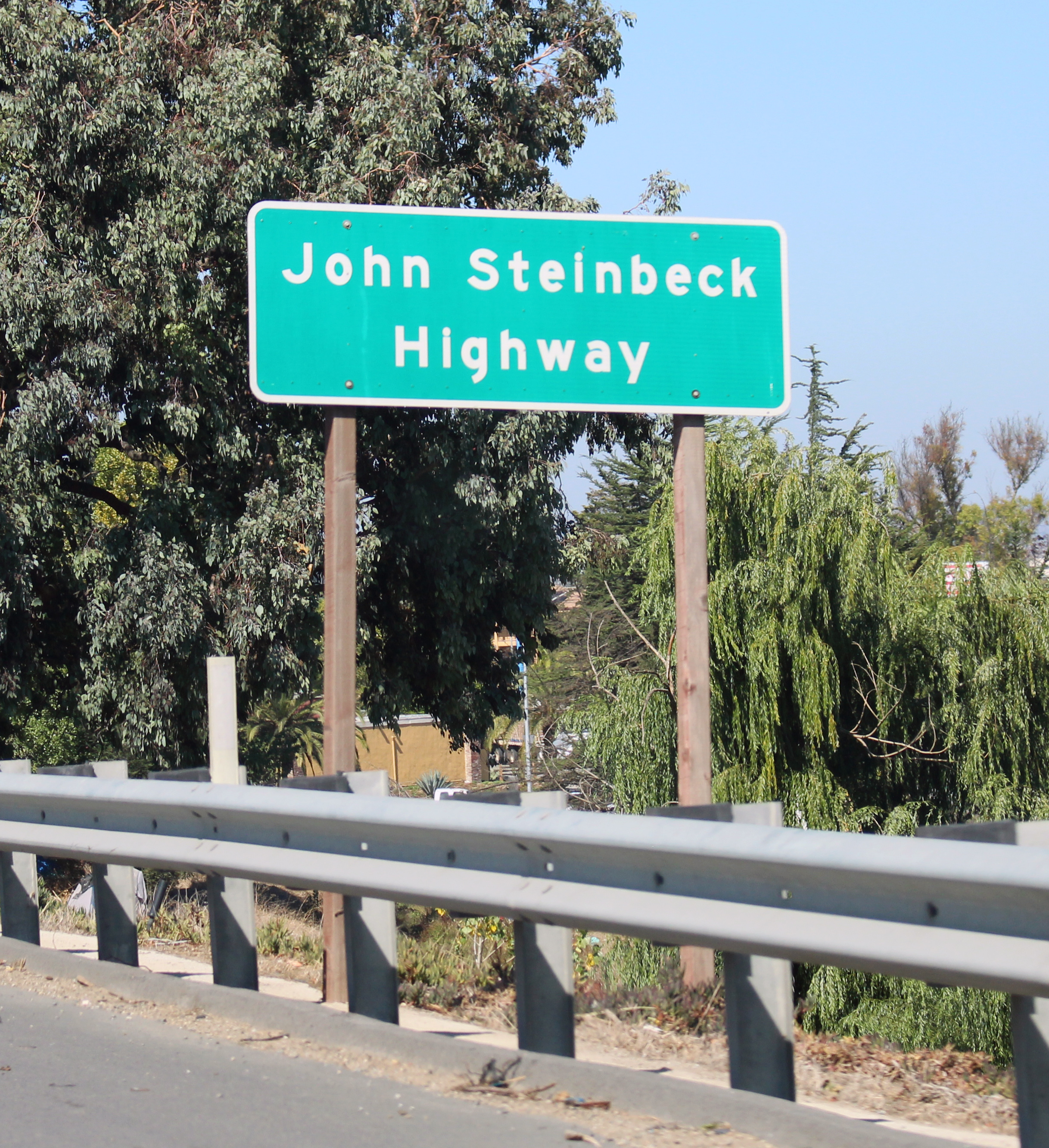
U.S. Route 101 is signed as the John Steinbeck Highway through Salinas.

Steinbeck's boyhood home, a turreted Victorian building in downtown Salinas, has been preserved and restored by the Valley Guild, a nonprofit organization. Fixed menu lunches are served Monday through Saturday, and the house is open for tours on Sunday afternoons during the summer. The National Steinbeck Center is two blocks away at 1 Main Street. Dana Gioia (chair of the National Endowment for the Arts) told an audience at the center, "This is really the best modern literary shrine in the country, and I've seen them all." Its "Steinbeckiana" includes "Rocinante", the camper-truck in which Steinbeck made the cross-country trip described in Travels with Charley. His father's cottage on Eleventh Street in Pacific Grove, where Steinbeck wrote some of his earliest books, also survives.

In Monterey, Ed Ricketts's laboratory survives (though it is not yet open to the public), and at the corner that Steinbeck describes in Cannery Row, also the store that once belonged to Lee Chong and the adjacent vacant lot frequented by the hoboes of Cannery Row. The site of the Hovden Sardine Cannery next to Doc's laboratory is now occupied by the Monterey Bay Aquarium. In 1958, the street that Steinbeck described as "Cannery Row" in the novel, once named Ocean View Avenue, was renamed Cannery Row in honor of the novel. The town of Monterey has commemorated Steinbeck's work with an avenue of flags depicting characters from Cannery Row, historical plaques, and sculptured busts depicting Steinbeck and Ricketts.

San Jose's Dr. Martin Luther King Jr. Library is home to the Martha Heasley Cox Center for Steinbeck Studies, an archive and museum which since 2002 has published the Steinbeck Review.

On February 27, 1979 (the 77th anniversary of the writer's birth), the United States Postal Service issued a stamp featuring Steinbeck, starting the Postal Service's Literary Arts series honoring American writers.

Steinbeck was inducted into the DeMolay International Hall of Fame in 1995.

On December 5, 2007, California governor Arnold Schwarzenegger and First Lady Maria Shriver inducted Steinbeck into the California Hall of Fame, located at the California Museum for History, Women and the Arts. His son, author Thomas Steinbeck, accepted the award on his behalf.

Monterey Bay Roller Derby was founded in 2010. Their team names over the years have referenced Steinbeck, including Beasts of Eden, Cannery Rollers, Steinwreckers and Babes of Wrath. Their juniors league was known as the Dread Ponies.

To commemorate the 112th anniversary of Steinbeck's birthday on February 27, 2014, Google displayed an interactive doodle using animation which included illustrations portraying scenes and quotes from several novels by the author.

Steinbeck and his friend Ed Ricketts appear as fictionalized characters in the 2016 novel Monterey Bay, about the founding of the Monterey Bay Aquarium, by Lindsay Hatton (Penguin Press).

In February 2016, Caltrans installed signage to identify a five-mile segment of U.S. Route 101 in Salinas as the John Steinbeck Highway, in accordance with a 2014 state legislative resolution.

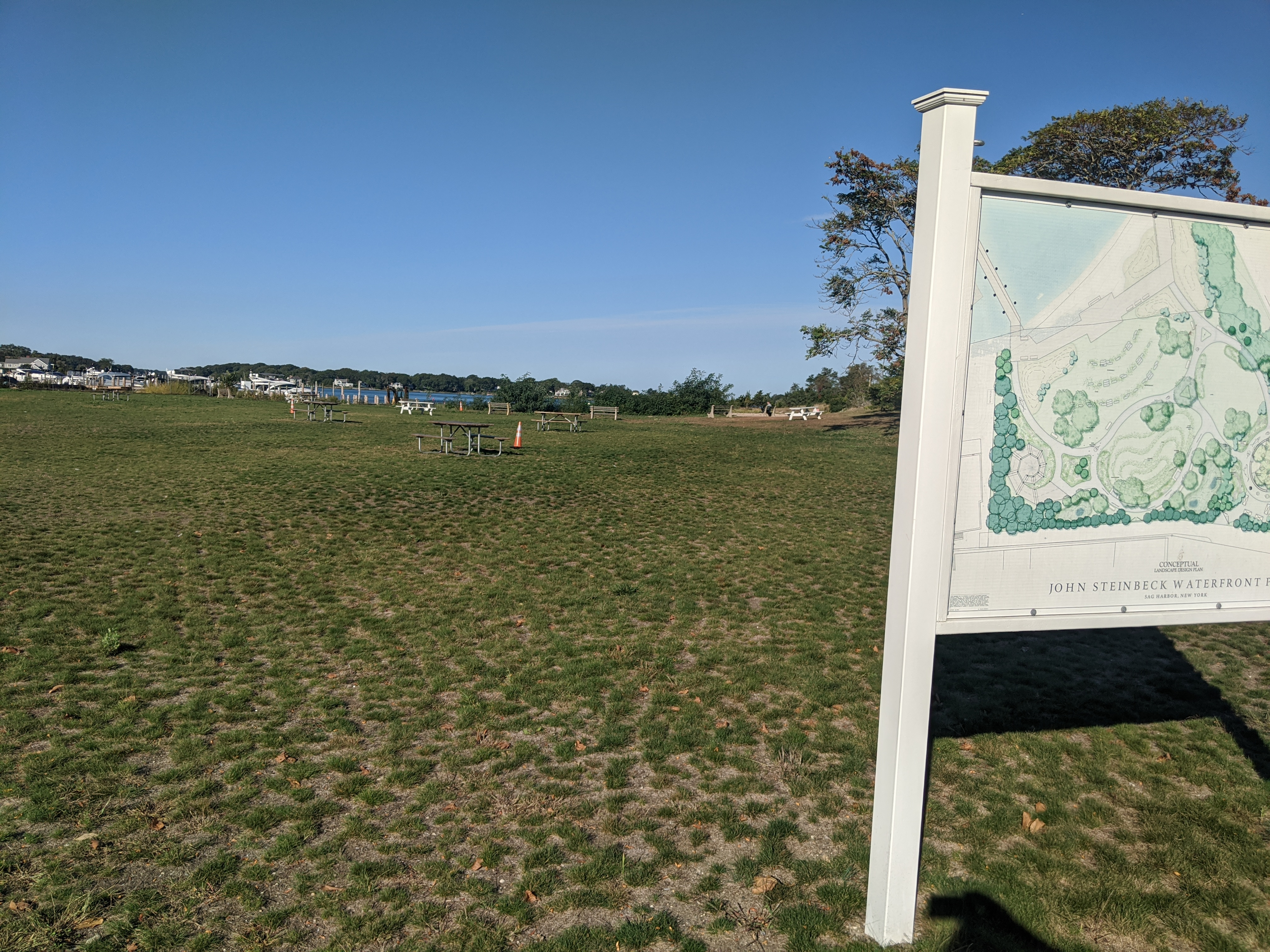
John Steinbeck Waterfront Park

In 2019 the Sag Harbor town board approved the creation of the John Steinbeck Waterfront Park across from the iconic town windmill. The structures on the parcel were demolished and park benches installed near the beach. The Beebe windmill replica already had a plaque memorializing the author who wrote from a small hut overlooking the cove during his sojourn in the literary haven.

== Religious views ==
Steinbeck was affiliated to the St. Paul's Episcopal Church and he stayed attached throughout his life to Episcopalianism although Steinbeck later became agnostic. Especially in his works of fiction, Steinbeck was highly conscious of religion and incorporated it into his style and themes. The shaping of his characters often drew on the Bible and the theology of Anglicanism, combining elements of Catholicism and Protestantism.

Steinbeck distanced himself from religious views when he left Salinas for Stanford. However, the work he produced still reflected the language of his childhood at Salinas, and his beliefs remained a powerful influence within his fiction and non-fiction work. William Ray considered his Episcopal views are prominently displayed in The Grapes of Wrath, in which themes of conversion and self-sacrifice play a major part in the characters Casy and Tom, who achieve spiritual transcendence through conversion.

== Political views ==
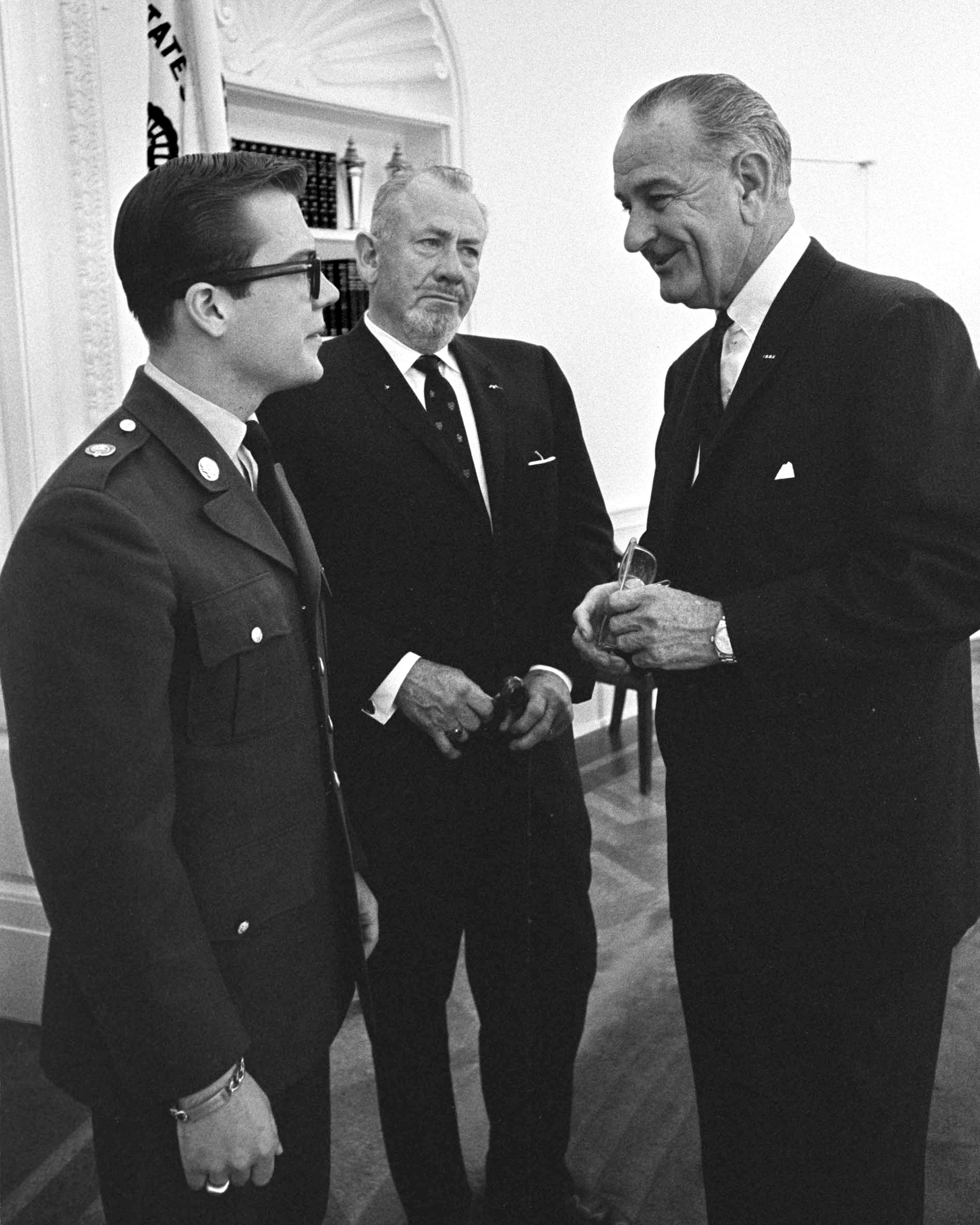
John Steinbeck, with his 19-year-old son John (left), visits his friend President Lyndon B. Johnson in the Oval Office, May 16, 1966. John Jr. is shortly to leave for active duty in Vietnam.

Steinbeck's contacts with leftist authors, journalists, and labor union figures may have influenced his writing, but his political views varied throughout his career. Steinbeck rejected political philosophies he considered dogmatic, such as Marxism, during his lifetime.

=== Spying for the CIA ===
Documents released by the Central Intelligence Agency in 2012 indicate that Steinbeck offered his services to the Agency in 1952, while planning a European tour, and the Director of Central Intelligence, Walter Bedell Smith, was eager to take him up on the offer. What work, if any, Steinbeck may have performed for the CIA during the Cold War is unknown. It is also unclear if Steinbeck actually provided any useful information to the CIA.

Documents released by the Security Service of Ukraine following the Revolution of Dignity in 2014 indicate that the Soviet KGB suspected him of being an American agent when he visited locations within the USSR, including Kyiv, in 1947.

=== Leftist alliances ===
Throughout his relationship with Carol Henning, Steinbeck attended political gatherings and study circles on feminist, trade unionist, and socialist topics, however according to observers, he remained apolitical and "alternately moped and scowled in the corners" during these events. He joined the League of American Writers, a Communist organization, in 1935. Steinbeck was mentored by radical writers Lincoln Steffens and his wife Ella Winter. Through Francis Whitaker, a member of the Communist Party USA's John Reed Club for writers, Steinbeck met with strike organizers from the Cannery and Agricultural Workers' Industrial Union. He also hosted members of the local John Reed Club and Young Communist League at his house for meals. In 1939, he signed a letter with some other writers in support of the Soviet invasion of Finland and the Soviet-established puppet government.

Steinbeck was a close associate of playwright Arthur Miller. In June 1957, Steinbeck took a personal and professional risk by supporting him when Miller refused to disclose names in the House Un-American Activities Committee trials. Steinbeck called the period one of the "strangest and most frightening times a government and people have ever faced".

In 1963, Steinbeck visited the Armenian Soviet Socialist Republic at the behest of President John F. Kennedy. During his visit he sat for a rare portrait by painter Martiros Saryan and visited Geghard Monastery. He also met with Armenian poet Hovhannes Shiraz in Yerevan. Steinbeck's letter of thanks for Shiraz's hospitality is now displayed at the Shiraz house museum in Gyumri. Footage of this visit filmed by Rafael Aramyan was sold in 2013 by his granddaughter.

=== Vietnam war ===
In 1967, when he was sent to Vietnam to report on the war, his sympathetic portrayal of the United States Army led the New York Post to denounce him for betraying his leftist past. Steinbeck's biographer, Jay Parini, says Steinbeck's friendship with President Lyndon B. Johnson influenced his views on Vietnam. Steinbeck may also have been concerned about the safety of his son serving in Vietnam. Steinbeck opposed the anti-war movement in the United States, denouncing the "fallout, drop-out, cop-out insurgency of our children and young people, the rush to stimulant as well as hypnotic drugs, the rise of narrow, ugly, and vengeful cults of all kinds, the mistrust and revolt against all authority – this in a time of plenty such as has never been known."

Along with Albert Einstein, Steinbeck was one of the sponsors of the Peoples' World Convention (PWC), also known as Peoples' World Constituent Assembly (PWCA), which took place in 1950–51 at Palais Electoral, Geneva, Switzerland.

=== Government harassment ===
Steinbeck complained publicly about government harassment. Thomas Steinbeck, the author's eldest son, said that J. Edgar Hoover, the director of the FBI at the time, could find no basis for prosecuting Steinbeck and therefore used his power to encourage the U.S. Internal Revenue Service to audit Steinbeck's taxes every single year of his life, just to annoy him. According to Thomas, a true artist is one who "without a thought for self, stands up against the stones of condemnation, and speaks for those who are given no real voice in the halls of justice, or the halls of government. By doing so, these people will naturally become the enemies of the political status quo."

In a 1942 letter to United States Attorney General Francis Biddle, John Steinbeck wrote: "Do you suppose you could ask Edgar's boys to stop stepping on my heels? They think I am an enemy alien. It is getting tiresome." The FBI denied that Steinbeck was under investigation.

== Major works ==
=== Cup of Gold ===
This was Steinbeck's first novel. It is loosely based on the life and death of privateer Henry Morgan. It centers on Morgan's assault and sacking of Panamá Viejo, sometimes referred to as the "Cup of Gold", and on the women, brighter than the sun, who were said to be found there.

=== Tortilla Flat ===
Steinbeck's first commercial success, published in 1935, is an episodic fiction recounting adventures of a loosely attached group of delinquent locals in a shabby coastal district of California. Like other books of Steinbeck's, Tortilla Flat was adapted into a feature film.

=== In Dubious Battle ===
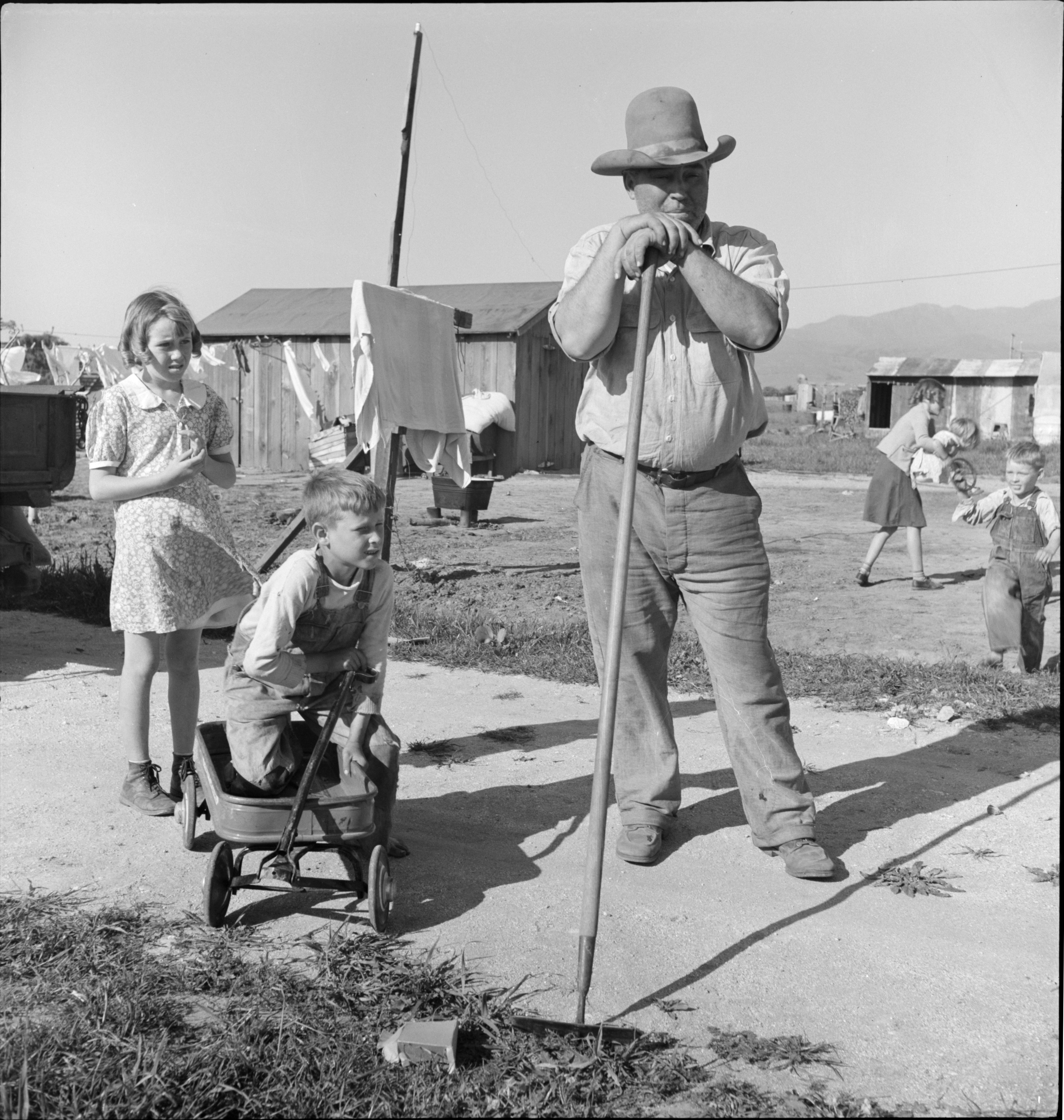
Salinas migrant workers, photo by Dorothea Lange

In 1936, Steinbeck published the first of what came to be known as his Dust Bowl trilogy, which included Of Mice and Men and The Grapes of Wrath. This first novel tells the story of a fruit pickers' strike in California which is both aided and damaged by the help of "the Party", generally taken to be the Communist Party, although this is never spelled out in the book.

=== Of Mice and Men ===
Of Mice and Men is a 1937 tragic novel that Steinbeck rewrote as a play that same year. The story is about two traveling ranch workers, George and Lennie, trying to earn enough money to buy their own farm/ranch. As it is set in 1930s America, it provides an insight into The Great Depression, encompassing themes of racism, loneliness, prejudice against the mentally ill, and the struggle for personal independence. Along with The Grapes of Wrath, East of Eden, and The Pearl, Of Mice and Men is one of Steinbeck's best known works. It was made into movies three times: in 1939, starring Burgess Meredith, Lon Chaney Jr., and Betty Field; in 1981, starring Randy Quaid, Robert Blake and Ted Neeley; and in 1992, starring Gary Sinise and John Malkovich.

=== The Grapes of Wrath ===
The Grapes of Wrath was published during the Great Depression and had a contemporary setting, describing a family of sharecroppers, the Joads, who were driven from their land by the dust storms of the Dust Bowl. The title is a reference to the Battle Hymn of the Republic. Some critics found it too sympathetic to the workers' plight and too critical of capitalism, but it found a large audience of its own. It won both the National Book Award and Pulitzer Prize for fiction (novels) and was adapted as a film starring Henry Fonda and Jane Darwell and directed by John Ford.

=== Cannery Row ===
The 1945 novel tells of a marine biologist in a seedy district dotted with sardine canneries in Monterey, California, who is feted by colorful neighbors in gratitude for his kindness to them. Cannery Row and its sequel, Sweet Thursday, were adapted into a movie in 1982.

=== East of Eden ===
Steinbeck deals with the nature of good and evil in this 1952 Salinas Valley saga. The story follows two families: the Hamiltons – based on Steinbeck's own maternal ancestry – and the Trasks, reprising stories about the biblical Adam and his progeny. His paternal ancestry is also reflected in the story. The book was published in 1952. Portions of the novel were made into a 1955 movie directed by Elia Kazan and starring James Dean. East of Eden was Steinbeck's favorite of the novels he wrote.

=== Travels with Charley ===
In 1960, Steinbeck bought a pickup truck and had it modified with a custom-built camper top – which was rare at the time – and drove across the United States with his faithful "blue" standard poodle, Charley. Steinbeck nicknamed his truck Rocinante after Don Quixote's "noble steed". In this sometimes comical, sometimes melancholic book, Steinbeck describes what he sees as he travels from Maine to Montana to California, and from there to Texas and Louisiana and back to his home on Long Island. However, in 2011, after his death, a reporter who had followed Travels with Charley's trail using the author's own diaries controverted the book's accuracy, casting Steinbeck's claimed reportage as largely fictionalized, allegations supported by scholars and Steinbeck's son John.

The restored camper truck is on exhibit in the National Steinbeck Center in Salinas.

== See also ==
- Pigasus – a personal stamp used by Steinbeck
