= Tortilla Flat =

1935 novel by John Steinbeck

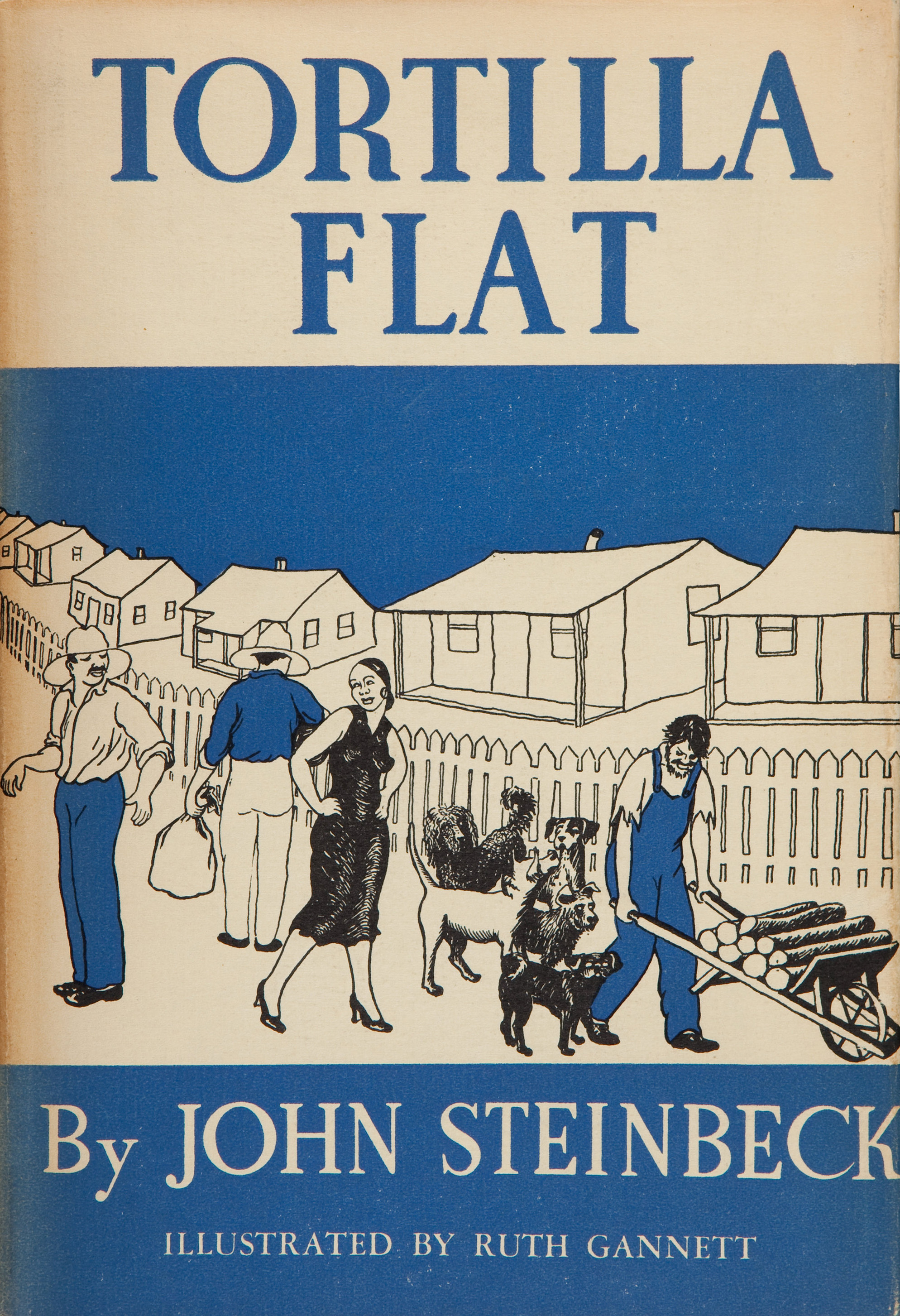
- First edition
- Author: John Steinbeck
- Cover artist: Ruth Chrisman Gannett
- Language: English
- Publisher: Covici-Friede
- Publication date: 1935
- Publication place: United States
- Media type: Print (hardback & paperback)
- OCLC: 576516
- Dewey Decimal: 813.52
- LC Class: PS3537.T3234

Tortilla Flat (1935) is an early John Steinbeck novel set in Monterey, California. The novel was the author's first clear critical and commercial success.

The book portrays a group of paisanos—literally, "countrymen"—a small band of errant friends enjoying life and wine in the days after the end of World War I.

Tortilla Flat was made into a film in 1942. Steinbeck later returned to some of the panhandling locals of Monterey (though not the Mexican paisanos of the Flat) in his novel Cannery Row (1945).

== Plot ==
Above the town of Monterey on the California coast lies the shabby district of Tortilla Flat, inhabited by a loose gang of jobless locals of Mexican-Indian-Spanish-Caucasian descent (who typically claim pure Spanish blood).

The central character, Danny, inherits two houses from his grandfather where he and his friends go to live. Danny's house, and Danny's friends, Steinbeck compares to the Round Table, and the Knights of the Round Table. Most of the action is set in the time of Steinbeck's own late teenage and young adult years, shortly after World War I.

The following chapter titles from the work, along with short summaries, outline the adventures the dipsomaniacal group endure in order to procure red wine and friendship.

=== Chapter summary ===
1 How Danny, home from the wars, found himself an heir, and how he swore to protect the helpless. — After working as a mule-driver during The Great War, Danny returns to find he has inherited two houses from his deceased grandfather. Danny gets drunk and goes to jail. He and the jailer drink wine at Torelli's. After escaping, Danny talks his friend, a clever man named Pilon, into sharing his brandy and his houses.

2 How Pilon was lured by greed of position to forsake Danny's hospitality. — Danny fails to get the water turned on. Pilon kills a rooster, rents Danny's second house for money which it is understood he will never pay, and exchanges paper roses for a gallon of Señora Torelli's wine.

3 How the poison of possessions wrought with Pilon, and how evil temporarily triumphed in him. — Danny and Pilon share wine, two women, and a fight. Drunk a second time, Pilon sublets half his house to Pablo.

4 How Jesus Maria Corcoran, a good man, became an unwilling vehicle of evil. — Pablo, Pilon and Danny discuss women and the payment of rent. Pablo and Pilon sublet their house to Jesus Maria. Since he has just $3 and a dime with him, they take a $2 deposit and leave him the rest to buy a woman he likes a present.

5 How Saint Francis turned the tide and put a gentle punishment on Pilon and Pablo and Jesus Maria. — Pilon and Pablo enjoy two gallons of wine. Monterey prepares for night. Pablo enjoys dinner, firewood and love from Mrs. Torelli. Jesus Maria is beaten up by soldiers because he enjoys their whiskey and their girlfriend Arabella. Pablo's candle, dedicated to St. Francis, burns down the house, while Danny, who is with Mrs. Morales next door, pays no attention.

6 How three sinful men, through contrition, attained peace. How Danny's friends swore comradeship. — Pablo, Pilon and Jesus Maria sleep in the pine forest. They wake up smelling a picnic lunch which becomes theirs, and is shared with Danny, into whose remaining house they move.

7 How Danny's friends became a force for good. How they succored the poor pirate. — The pirate, a mentally handicapped man who is followed by five dogs, is invited by Pilon to stay at Danny's house. Pirate promised that if God would save his sick dog, he would buy a golden candlestick for St. Francis. The sickly dog recovered, though he was soon after run over by a truck. Pirate is determined to keep his promise to buy a gold candlestick for St. Francis with 1000 quarters, or "two-bitses" ($250). The Pirate is the only paisano who works, and makes 25 cents a day selling kindling, but lives on food scraps given in charity, and saves the cash. He has hidden a great bag of quarters, known about by all. When he reveals his treasure to them, they are guilted into aiding him in his endeavor.

8 How Danny's Friends sought mystic treasure on Saint Andrew's Eve. How Pilon found it and later how a pair of serge pants changed ownership twice. — Joe Portagee returns from army jail, burns down a whorehouse, goes to jail again. He and Pilon seek treasure in the woods on St. Andrew's Eve (29 Nov), and see the faint beam from a spot which they mark. Next night, with wine Joe has gotten for a blanket he has stolen from Danny, they dig at the spot and uncover something labeled "United States Geodetic Survey + 1915 + Elevation 600 Feet". Realizing it is a crime to take, they get drunk on the Seaside beach. Pilon, to punish Joe for stealing from his host, recovers the blanket and trades Joe's pants for wine, leaving Joe naked on the beach.

9 How Danny was ensnared by a vacuum cleaner and how Danny's friends rescued him. — Danny trades stolen copper nails for money for a vacuum cleaner from Mr. Simon, to give to Sweets Ramirez (who has no electricity). Sweets contentedly pretends she has electricity, pushing the machine over the floor while humming to herself, and Danny wins her favors. He spends every evening with Sweets, until Pilon, telling himself he misses his friend, takes the vacuum and trades it to Torelli, the local shopkeep, for wine. Torelli then finds the vacuum which has been "run" with pretend electricity, actually has a pretend motor.

10 How the friends solaced a corporal and in return received a lesson in paternal ethics. — Jesus Maria befriends a young man with a baby, and brings him to the house. The baby is sick. A Capitán has stolen the man's wife. The baby dies, and the man explains why he wanted the baby to be a Generál, saying that if a mere Capitan could steal his own wife, then imagine what a general could take. The friends take few moments to digest the moral of this, then make a satirical statement in support.

11 How, under the most adverse circumstances, love came to Big Joe Portagee. — Joe Portagee comes out of the rain into Tia Ignacia's. He drinks her wine, goes to sleep, and wakes up to a beating from the woman because he drank her wine and did NOT take advantage of her. In the midst of fending off this attack in the middle of the street and in the rain, he is stricken with lust. A policeman happens by and asks them to stop doing what they're doing in middle of the muddy road.

12 How Danny's friends assisted the pirate to keep a vow, and how as a reward for merit the pirate's dogs saw a holy vision. — The pirate finally trusts Danny and delivers his bag of quarters into the house, whereupon the bag disappears. Big Joe is beaten into unconsciousness for stealing the money. The friends take the thousand quarters which the pirate has earned over several years of woodcutting, to Father Ramon for him to buy a candlestick and feast. In San Carlos Church on Sunday the Pirate sees his candlestick before St. Francis. The dogs rush into the church and must be removed. Later the pirate preaches all of Fr. Ramon's St. Francis stories to the dogs, which are suddenly startled by something behind him, which the pirate believes must be a vision.

13 How Danny's friends threw themselves to the aid of a distressed lady. — The unmarried Teresina Cortez has a menagerie of nine healthy babies and children, who all live on nothing but tortillas and beans, but nevertheless are found amazingly healthy by the school doctor. Teresina gleans the beans from the fields. As the Madonna of the tale, Teresina produces the droves of babies with seemingly no particular help. When the bean crop is ruined by rain, Danny's housemates steal food all over Monterey for the children. It makes them sick. However, the arrival of some stolen sacks of beans at the door is deemed a miracle, the children regain their health, and Teresina is also pregnant again. She wonders which one of Danny's friends was responsible.

14 Of the good life at Danny's house, of a gift pig, of the pain of Tall Bob, and of the thwarted love of the viejo Ravanno. Why the windows shouldn't be cleaned. The friends tell stories. Danny: how Cornelia lost Emilio's little pig to its sow. Pablo: how everyone laughed after Tall Bob blew his nose off. Jesus Maria: how Petey Ravanno got Gracie by hanging himself and being rescued at exactly the right moment, thus convincing her of his love; and how Petey's father the viejo (old man) hanged himself to get the same effect, but the door blew shut at exactly the wrong moment, and nobody saw him.

15 How Danny brooded and became mad. How the Devil in the shape of Torelli assaulted Danny's house. — Danny moves to the forest and cannot be found by his friends. When Torelli shows the friends the bill of sale for Danny's house, they steal and burn it.

16 Of the sadness of Danny. How through sacrifice Danny's friends gave a party. How Danny was translated. — Danny is deeply remorseful. His friends work a whole day cutting squid for Chin Kee. All of Tortilla Flat makes a party at Danny's home. He enjoys many women, and challenges all men to fight (wielding a table leg). He dies after a 40-foot (12 m) fall into the gulch.

17 How Danny's sorrowing friends defied the conventions. How the talismanic bond was burned. How each friend departed alone. — Danny's friends cannot dress adequately for his military funeral. They tell stories of him beforehand, in the gulch. Afterward, they drink wine stolen by Pilon from Torelli's. Pablo sings "Tuli Pan". A small fire is accidentally set in the house, and the friends watch in approval, doing nothing to save it. No two walk away together from the smoking ruins.

== Reception ==
Tortilla Flat provided Steinbeck with his first commercial success. Thomas Fensch, in an introduction to the novel, cited the idyllic setting, where "money is seldom needed" and all the characters desire is "enough food, a warm place to sleep, wine, and – occasionally – women and parties" as providing escapism for readers during the Great Depression.

Contemporary critics praised the novel as entertainment, although some criticised the meandering plot. The New York World-Telegram described the book as a "grand time" though the reviewer also felt that the ending "feels a little too casual to be moving". The New York Times, meanwhile, praised Steinbeck's "gift for drollery and for turning Spanish talk and phrases into a gently mocking English".
