= The Acts of King Arthur and His Noble Knights =

1976 book by John Steinbeck

- First edition
- Author: John Steinbeck
- Language: English
- Genre: Arthurian legend
- Publisher: Farrar, Straus and Giroux
- Publication date: September 1976
- Publication place: United States
- Media type: Print (Hardcover)
- Pages: 363
- ISBN: 0-374-10085-3
- Dewey Decimal: 823/.2
- LC Class: PZ3.S8195 Ac 1976

The Acts of King Arthur and His Noble Knights (1976) is John Steinbeck's retelling of the Arthurian legend, based on the Winchester Manuscript text of Sir Thomas Malory's Le Morte d'Arthur. He began his adaptation in November 1956. Steinbeck had long been a lover of the Arthurian legends. The introduction to his translation contains an anecdote about his reading them as a young boy. His enthusiasm for Arthur is apparent in the work. The book was left unfinished at his death, and ends with the death of chivalry in Arthur's purest knight, Lancelot of the Lake.

Steinbeck took a "living approach" to the retelling of Malory's work. He followed Malory's structure and retained the original chapter titles, but he explored the psychological underpinning of the events, and tuned the use of language to sound natural and accessible to a Modern English speaker:

Malory wrote the stories for and to his time. Any man hearing him knew every word and every reference. There was nothing obscure, he wrote the clear and common speech of his time and country. But that has changed—the words and references are no longer common property, for a new language has come into being. Malory did not write the stories. He simply wrote them for his time and his time understood them ... And with that, almost by enchantment the words began to flow.

Based on Steinbeck's letters collected in the Appendix to the volume, he appears to have worked on the book intensely from about November 1956 through late 1959, but after that never returned to the work.

From March to October 1959, Steinbeck and his wife Elaine rented a cottage in the hamlet of Discove, Redlynch, near Bruton in Somerset, England, while Steinbeck researched his retelling of the Arthurian legend of King Arthur and the Knights of the Round Table. Glastonbury Tor was visible from the cottage, and Steinbeck also visited the nearby hillfort of Cadbury Castle, the supposed site of King Arthur's court of Camelot. The unfinished manuscript was published after his death in 1976, as The Acts of King Arthur and His Noble Knights. The Steinbecks recounted the time spent in Somerset as the happiest of their life together.
