= Cannery Row (novel) =

1945 novel by John Steinbeck

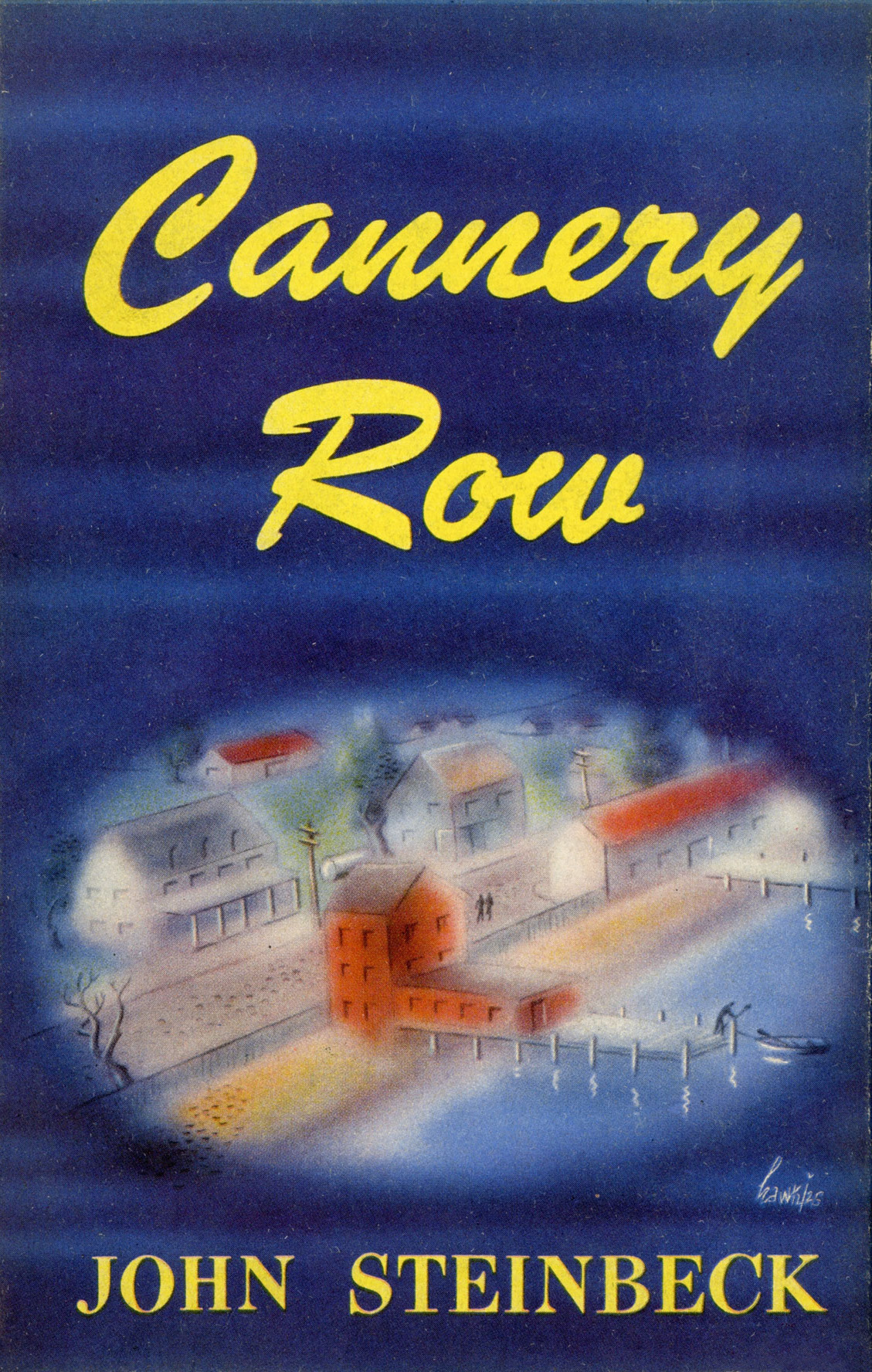
- First edition
- Author: John Steinbeck
- Genre: Regionalism; Slice of life
- Publisher: Viking Press
- Publication date: January 1945
- Media type: Hardcover
- Pages: 208 hardback (181 paperback)
- OCLC: 175742
- LC Class: PZ3.S8195 Can
- Followed by: Sweet Thursday

Cannery Row is a novel by American author John Steinbeck, published in 1945. It is set during the Great Depression in Monterey, California, on a street lined with sardine canneries that is known as Cannery Row. The story revolves around the people living there: Lee Chong, the local grocer; Doc, a marine biologist; and Mack, the leader of a group of derelict people. The Monterey location Steinbeck was writing about, on Ocean View Avenue, had been informally called "Cannery Row" since World War I. The street was formally renamed "Cannery Row" in 1958 in honor of Steinbeck. A film version was released in 1982 and a stage version was produced in 1995.

== Background ==
Steinbeck was born in the farming town of Salinas, California, on February 27, 1902. He graduated from Salinas High School and enrolled at Stanford University in 1919. He married his first wife, Carol Henning, in 1930. During the 1930s, Steinbeck wrote several of his most popular novels, including Tortilla Flat (1935), In Dubious Battle (1936), Of Mice and Men (1937) and The Grapes of Wrath (1939). Steinbeck and his wife lived in his family's three-room summer cottage in Pacific Grove, California frequently from 1930 to 1936. He also lived at the cottage at various times in the 1940s. Steinbeck wrote Cannery Row in 1944, when he was living in New York. The book was published in 1945.

In a 1953 essay describing the inspiration for Cannery Row, Steinbeck explained that "it was kind of a nostalgic thing for a group of soldiers who said to me: 'Write something funny that isn't about the war. Write something for us to read - we're sick of war.'"

When business was booming in the sardine-canning district of Monterey, California during World War I, and several new canneries were built forming a continuous row, the name "Cannery Row" was born. After the success of Steinbeck's novel in 1945, "Cannery Row" gained wide recognition. In 1958, Ocean Avenue was renamed "Cannery Row" in honor of Steinbeck.

== Plot summary ==
The story centers on a local marine biologist, Doc, and his relationship with Mack and friends, a group of unemployed men, and other residents in the sardine-canning district of Monterey, California. Mack and his buddies are looking to do something nice for their friend Doc, who has been good to them without asking for reward. Mack hits on the idea that they should throw a thank-you party, and the entire community quickly becomes involved. Unfortunately, the party rages out of control, and Doc's lab and home are ruined—and so is Doc's mood. In an effort to return to Doc's good graces, Mack and the boys decide to throw another party—but make it work this time. According to writer Eka Kurniawan, "the novel invites us to see the world from a humble, and at times very narrow, perspective. From the engine of a dilapidated Ford Model T to the cash register of a grocery store owned by a Chinese immigrant, even to a brothel."

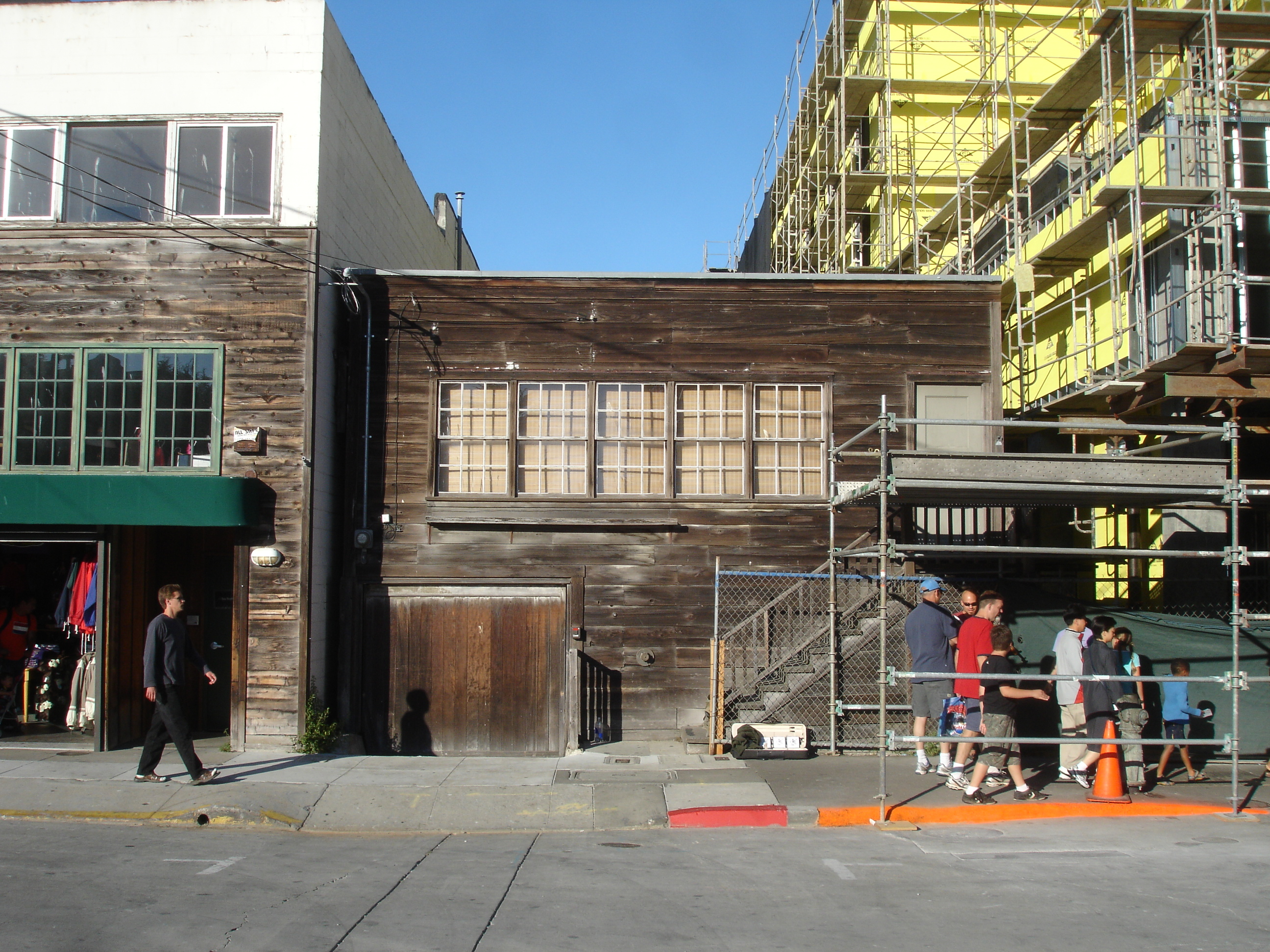
Ed Ricketts' lab at 800 Cannery Row, Monterey

=== Main characters ===
Doc is a marine biologist who runs a biological specimen business, Western Biological Laboratories, who collects, prepares and markets specimens of fish and mammals for research and dissection. He pays bounties for certain creatures he needs, like cats and frogs. In addition to keeping live creatures on the premises, Doc prepares the specimens in his laboratory that also serves as his living quarters. Doc was based on Steinbeck's friend Ed Ricketts, a marine biologist and entrepreneur.

Lee Chong, an immigrant from China, owns and personally operates the grocery store across from Doc's lab, "Lee Chong's Heavenly Grocery". His store supplies all the needs of the denizens of Cannery Row. Lee Chong was inspired by Won Yee, an immigrant from China who operated the Wing Chong Company Grocery. Won pioneered the drying and preparation of squid, which was exported to China. Won died in 1934.

Dora Flood is the owner and proprietor of the Bear Flag Restaurant, the most prominent and busiest bordello in Monterey. She is a whore with a heart of gold who greatly benefits the community with her public and private charity. Dora Flood is based on Flora Woods Adams, a bordello owner who also figures in Steinbeck's earlier novel Tortilla Flat and in East of Eden.

Mack is a seemingly homeless person who is the de facto leader of a group of other homeless men that congregate in Cannery Row. Mack negotiates with Lee Chong for the occupancy of a storage shack where he and the boys can live, which is fixed up and dubbed "The Palace Flophouse". His character was based on Cannery Row denizen Harold Otis "Gabe" Bicknell. A photo of Bicknell was used on the cover of the 1994 paperback edition of the novel.

Hazel, a simple minded but good hearted-young man who was given a female name by a mother too tired from child-bearing to realize her error at first or subsequently to care, is the most prominent of Mack's boys.

Henri is a painter and visual artist who creates works of art out of different materials, such as feathers and nutshells. He is building a boat on blocks that he will never put out to sea. He romances a succession of women in the boat, who finally leave him due to its cramped quarters and lack of a bathroom.

== Sweet Thursday ==
Steinbeck later wrote a sequel to Cannery Row, called Sweet Thursday, published in 1954. In Sweet Tuesday, several new characters are introduced, the canneries have closed, and Doc finds love, with the help of his friends.

== Reception ==
At the time of its publication, many critics dismissed Cannery Row as "mere whimsy and easy caricature, the sort of slim pickings that reviewers love to hate because it allows them to mine their febrile talents for hilarious ridicule and clever zingers." The New York Times Book Review and several East Coast reviewers excoriated the book. On the West Coast, the reviewer for the Los Angeles Times, Benjamin Howden, acknowledged that Cannery Row wasn't Steinbeck's best effort. "But the parts that are good are so uproariously funny that the little volume bids fair to outsell everything he has done since [The Grapes of Wrath]". In a reassessment of the novel in 1977, Jackson J. Benson, Professor of American Literature at San Diego State University, wrote, "On one hand the book has become a favorite among many Steinbeck readers and has turned Ed Ricketts into legend and Cannery Row itself into a mecca for tourists. The novel still baffles the critics."

== Adaptations ==
=== Film ===
A film version was released in 1982, starring Nick Nolte and Debra Winger. The screenplay was written by David S. Ward and based on Sweet Thursday and Cannery Row.

=== Stage ===
In 1994, the Western Stage in Salinas, California, commissioned J.R. Hall to do a stage adaptation of the novel to commemorate the 50th anniversary of its publication. A year later, it was produced as part of the National Steinbeck Festival. Subsequently, it was revived by the Western Stage in 2005, and the Community College of Allegheny County in Pittsburgh, Pennsylvania in 2007.
