= The Murder (short story) =

- Short story by John Steinbeck
- Country: United States
- Language: English

Publication
- Publisher: The North American Review
- Media type: Print
- Publication date: April 1934

“The Murder” is a work of short fiction by John Steinbeck originally published in The North American Review, April 1934. The story was first collected in The Long Valley (1938) by Viking Press.

“The Murder” was the first of Steinbeck's works to win a national award: the 1934 O. Henry prize for short fiction.

== Plot ==
Jim Moore, a California rancher, marries a Yugoslavian immigrant girl, Jelka Sepic. At the wedding, Jelka's father offers intoxicated advice to Jim, warning him that his daughter requires regular beating to keep her loyal and tractable. Jim rejects the advice. He is disappointed, however, that no genuine intimacy develops in the relationship, though Jelka is dutiful and performs, bovine-like, her domestic tasks. Jim increasingly finds her demeanor and behavior foreign and strange. Before long, Jim begins to make weekly visits to a bordello in Monterey, whose denizens offer him familiar banter and comradery. Jelka makes no objection to these presumed overnight business trips.

On one of his nocturnal adventures, Jim encounters a fellow rancher who informs him that one of his calves has been butchered by rustlers. Jim verifies the report himself, then returns home after midnight. He discovers Jelka's male cousin sleeping in bed with her. Jim reflects on the incestuous couping, then quietly retrieves his rifle and, without first waking the pair, shoots the intruder in the head. After reporting the incident to the local sheriff, Jim is released and no charges are brought against him, as is customary in that district.

Taking his bullwhip, he leads Jelka to the barn and flogs her mercilessly, to which she submits. The next morning Jelka contentedly prepares breakfast for Jim, apparently satisfied with her husband.

== Background ==
The story may be a dramatization of an actual event.

Literary critic Richard S. Hughes reports that Steinbeck had first intended to develop the story as part of his Pastures of Heaven saga, a story cycle published in 1932. “The Murder” is likely one of the two stories involving murder that Steinbeck had intended for The Pastures of Heaven. This is supported by the fact that in manuscript form, Steinbeck had situated the story in California's Corral de Tierra—the setting for the Pasture tales. He subsequently changed the location to Valle de Castillo, California.

== Critical appraisal ==
“The Murder” has drawn criticism based on what appears to be a narrative rationalizing patriarchal violence as a method of disciplining a female spouse. The “enormously disturbing” climax has been interpreted as racialist and anti-feminist, presenting a “sexual double standard” in light of the husband's frequent enjoyment of prostitutes.

Biographer Warren French places the story in its historical context and identifies the story as more parody than an expression of ethnophobia. French writes:

It is perhaps a mark of the tastes of the times that in the 1930s this was the first story to be selected for the O. Henry prize...The manifest racial and anti-feminest prejudices make the story objectionable today, but read in the context of The Long Valley, it can be seen as another of Steinbeck’s mordantly ironic commentaries on the lack of sympathetic communication between human beings…

In terms of narrative technique, Steinbeck introduces, as he does in the stories in The Pastures of Heaven, a new, and largely uninvolved character to provide a trigger for the story's climax: George, a fellow rancher, delivers the report that causes Jim to unexpectedly return home and discover his wife's perfidy. Steinbeck's decision to provide a highly graphic rendering of the murder is linked to Jim's disaffection from his Yugoslavian spouse and her “foreignness.” Hughes writes:

The cathartic effect of Jim’s crime is immense. No doubt judges for O. Henry Memorial Award noticed this, and especially Steinbeck’s breathtaking description of the crucial scene.”

== Theme ==
Literary critics Katherine M. and Robert E. Morsberger refer to “The Murder” as a fusion of “biological naturalism” with an amalgam of “mythical, Biblical and folktale” archetypes. The thematic elements of the tale reveal themselves in its imagery rather than its plot. The wife of Slavic ancestry, Jelka, is representative of this blending of symbol and concrete detail. Morsberger and Morsberger write:

…Jelka embodies primitive passions that tie man to his biologically primordial past. Throughout she is so described with animal imagery and associated with both the domesticated animals of the farm and the wildlife of the forests that the cumulative effect is to almost portray her as a creature out of the fairy tale, a doe or some beast metamorphosed under a spell into human form.

The butchering of the a calf stolen from Jim's herd is linked to the murder of Jelka's lover in that both exhibit fairy-tale imagery combining “realism with ritual.” Morsberger and Morsberger point out that the description of the rustling “suggests some primitive blood rite” as does Steinbeck's formulaic rendering of the homicide. Barbour faults “The Murder" for failing to “combine the gothic with observed manners’ and charges that “the story is fundamentally confused” in its thematic purpose. The “absurdity” is revealed in its denouement: “There is a reconciliation between Jim and Jelka, and at the end they seem to have settled on a program of therapeutic beatings, and are thus forearmed for the future.”

== Sources ==
- Barbour, Brian M. 1976. “Steinbeck as a Short Story Writer” in A Study Guide to Steinbeck’s The Long Valley. 1976. The Pierian Press, Ball State University, Tetsumaro Hayashi, editor. pp. 113–128 ISBN 0-87650-074-2
- DeMott, Robert. 1996. Notes on the Text and Chronology in John Steinbeck: The Grapes of Wrath and Other Writings, 1936-1941. The Library of America. Notes/Notes on the Text pp. 1051–1067. ISBN 1-883011-15-9
- French, Warren. 1975. John Steinbeck. Twayne Publishers, Boston, Massachusetts. G. K. Hall & Co. ISBN 0-8057-0693-3
- Hughes, Richard. S. 1987. Beyond the Red Pony: A Reader’s Companion to Steinbeck’s Complete Short Stories. The Scarecrow Press, Mutuchen, New Jersey & London. ISBN 0-8108-1970-8
- Hughes, R. S.. 1989. John Steinbeck: A Study of the Short Fiction. Twayne Publishers, Boston, Massachusetts. G. K. Hall & Co. ISBN 0-8057-8302-4
- Steinbeck, John. 1996. John Steinbeck: The Grapes of Wrath and Other Writings, 1936-1941. The Library of America, Robert DeMott, notes and Elaine Anderson Steinbeck, consultant. ISBN 1-883011-15-9
