= Saint Katy the Virgin =

- Short story by John Steinbeck
- Country: United States
- Language: English

Publication
- Publisher: Covici-Friede
- Media type: Print
- Publication date: December 1936

"Saint Katy the Virgin" is a work of short fiction by John Steinbeck originally appearing as a limited edition monograph published by Covici-Friede in December 1936. The story was first collected in The Long Valley (1938) by Viking Press.

== Plot ==
"Saint Katy the Virgin" is presented as a third-person narrative. The story is set in 1300s Europe, the century in which the Black Death ravaged the continent.

A notorious reprobate named Roark owns a pig named Katy; the sow is as malicious as he. When two brothers from the local monastery arrive to collect the mandatory tithe, Roark hands them the satan-like Katy in payment. Brother Paul and Brother Colin attempt to depart with the pig—intending to slaughter her—but she viciously attacks them and drives them up a thorn tree. Paul responds by lowering an iron crucifix, dangling it over Katy's face: the devil who possessed her is instantly exorcized. The trio peacefully proceed to the monastery. There Father Benedict berates the brothers—Katy, now a Christian, is ineligible for slaughter. Father Benedict ruefully intones: "There are plenty of Christians. This year there's a great shortage of pigs."

Katy embarks on a life of piety and exhibits powers to heal the afflicted; thousands flock to the monastery. Her saintly behavior earns her nomination for canonization after her natural death. The church fathers, when informed that Katy had not been chaste in her lifetime—she bore a litter of piglets—declare the saintly sow had been, in retrospect, "a virgin by intent." Katy's sainthood is thus fully legitimized by theological experts.

Her bones are treated as holy relics that can heal female disorders and ringworm, and are long worshiped at the reliquary.

== Background ==
The origins for the story stem from Steinbeck's 1924-1925 attendance at Stanford University, where his coursework included topics on early European culture taught by Professor Edward Maslin Hume. Steinbeck joined his classmates in proposing absurd candidates for medieval canonization in the Catholic church. The 23-year-old Steinbeck wrote a short piece about a pig that achieved sainthood through rejecting sin and performing miracle cures—the seminal version of the tale.

By 1932, Steinbeck had completed a manuscript version of the story and presented it to his literary editors at McIntosh & Otis, remarking: "keep her if you want her. She was a pleasant afternoon to me..."

"Saint Katy the Virgin" remained unpublished until December 1936, when Covici-Friede offered it as a monograph, "signed and limited to 199 copies" and this edition quickly sold out. When Viking Press assembled the 1938 collection of short fiction The Long Valley, "Saint Katy the Virgin" was included by editor Pascal Covici with Steinbeck's approval.

== Critical Appraisal ==
The story is widely regarded as an "odd addition" to a volume of short fiction that deals almost exclusively with the lives of residents of the Salinas Valley during the Great Depression. The content and tone of the work is traceable to the fact that it was conceived while Steinbeck was attending Stanford University in his early 20s, and completed shortly before the other works presented in the 1938 volume. Biographer Warren French notes that the "mannered, facetious style" that dominates the work was abandoned by Steinbeck with the onset of the social and economic crisis that would inform his literary work during the 1930s.

Biographer and literary critic Richard S. Hughes characterizes the story as "a generic blend of the saint's life, beast fable, fabliau, and farce." The Springfield Weekly Republican (October 6, 1938) offered this assessment: "'Saint Katy the Virgin' merely adds itself to the long catalog of irreverent tales that have aimed satire and ridicule at priest and church since the close of the Dark Ages." With respect to the appearance of "Saint Katy the Virgin" in 1938 collection The Long Valley, Professor Brian M. Barnour writes:

The story points out both the [volume's] lack of organizing principle and the formal difficulties Steinbeck was having with the [short] story form. Its inclusion manifested a lack of critical judgment."

== Theme ==
The story has an affinity with the beast-fable genre popular during the Middle Ages. Hughes identifies the protagonist-pig as the device with which Steinbeck establishes his critique of humanity, "especially religious hypocrisy." Indeed, "the reaction of the Church to Katy provides the foundation for the satire." Literary critic Edmund Wilson notes that the function of Katy "is not to dignify the animal... but to make human religion ridiculous."

== Sources ==
- Barbour, Brian M. 1976. "Steinbeck as a Short Story Writer" in A Study Guide to Steinbeck's The Long Valley. 1976. The Pierian Press, Ball State University, Tetsumaro Hayashi, editor. pp. 113–128 ISBN 0-87650-074-2
- DeMott, Robert. 1996. Notes on the Text and Chronology in John Steinbeck: The Grapes of Wrath and Other Writings, 1936-1941. The Library of America. Notes/Notes on the Text pp. 1051–1067. ISBN 1-883011-15-9
- French, Warren. 1975. John Steinbeck. Twayne Publishers, Boston, Massachusetts. G. K. Hall & Co.. ISBN 0-8057-0693-3
- Hughes, Richard. S. 1987. Beyond the Red Pony: A Reader's Companion to Steinbeck's Complete Short Stories. The Scarecrow Press, Mutuchen, New Jersey & London. ISBN 0-8108-1970-8
- Hughes, R. S.. 1989. John Steinbeck: A Study of the Short Fiction. Twayne Publishers, Boston, Massachusetts. G. K. Hall & Co. ISBN 0-8057-8302-4
- Marovitz, Sanford E.. 1976. "The Cryptic Raillery of 'Saint Katy the Virgin'" in A Study Guide to Steinbeck's The Long Valley. 1976. The Pierian Press, Ball State University, Tetsumaro Hayashi, editor. pp. 73–80 ISBN 0-87650-074-2
- Steinbeck, John. 1996. John Steinbeck: The Grapes of Wrath and Other Writings, 1936-1941. The Library of America, Robert DeMott, notes and Elaine Anderson Steinbeck, consultant. ISBN 1-883011-15-9
