= The Long Valley =

1938 collection of short fiction by John Steinbeck

- First edition
- Author: John Steinbeck
- Language: English
- Genre: Short story collection
- Publisher: Viking Press
- Publication date: 1938
- Publication place: United States
- Media type: Print (hardback & paperback)
- OCLC: 940263143

The Long Valley is a collection of short fiction by John Steinbeck. Most of the stories appeared originally in literary periodicals, and were first collected by Viking Press in 1938.

Ranked among Steinbeck's "finest and best-known" fiction, these are among the most frequently anthologized of Steinbeck's stories, widely read by university undergraduates and high school students. Author and social critic Andre Gide declared that several stories in The Long Valley "equaled or surpassed" those of Russian author Anton Chekhov.

"The Murder" and "The Promise" were selected for the O. Henry Prize anthology for short fiction in 1934 and 1938, respectively.

== Stories ==
The literary periodical in which a story first appeared is indicated below.

- "The Chrysanthemums" (Harper's Magazine, October 1937)
- "The White Quail" (The North American Review, March 1935)
- "Flight"
- "The Snake" (The Monterey Beacon, June 22, 1935)
- "Breakfast" (Pacific Weekly, November 9, 1936)
- "The Raid" (The North American Review, October 1934)
- "The Harness" (Atlantic Monthly, June 1938)
- "The Vigilante" (Esquire, October 1936)
- "Johnny Bear" (Esquire, September 1937)
- "The Murder" (The North American Review, April 1934)
- "St. Katy the Virgin" (Covici-Friede, December 1936)
- The Red Pony
  - "The Gift" (The North American Review, November 1933)
  - "The Great Mountains" (The North American Review, December 1933)
  - "The Promise" (Harper's Magazine, August 1937)
- "The Leader of the People" (Argosy, August 1936)

== Publication history ==
The stories in the collections were written, with the exception of "St. Katy the Virgin," between the spring of 1933 and summer of 1934. All of them, except "Flight," appeared in literary journals previous to being collected in The Long Valley.

Covici-Friede, which had published Steinbeck's successful novellas Tortilla Flat (1935) and Of Mice and Men (1937), was facing bankruptcy in 1937. At their request, Steinbeck attempted to quickly assemble the stories that would comprise The Long Valley. Covici-Friede issued a limited edition of three works: "The Gift," "The Great Mountain," and "The Promise" entitled The Red Pony shortly before going out of business in July 1938. Pascal Covici moved to Viking Press as senior editor, where The Long Valley was published in September, 1938.

== Setting ==
The "long" valley of the title refers to the Salinas Valley of California. Of the 15 stories that comprise the volume, perhaps five or six can be positively identified with this valley. The other tales take place in several regions of California: "Flight" on the Pacific Coast north of Big Sur, "The Snake" on Cannery Row in Monterey, and "The Murder" in the Corral de Tierra. Biographer Richard S. Hughes places "Breakfast" in the San Joaquin or Sacramento valleys and "The Raid" and "The Vigilante" occur in unidentified "outlying small towns.". "The Red Pony" trilogy takes place near the Santa Lucia Mountains, 100 miles (160 km) south of Salinas. "Saint Katy the Virgin," geographically and temporally remote, is set in 14th century Europe.

== Reception ==
Critic Stanley Young in The New York Times Book Review (September 25, 1938) offered this measured praise for The Long Valley:

As a group they are neither profound nor passionate stories of great stature—that is, they do not illuminate an age or a people either emotionally or intellectually, and they are occasionally flagrantly sentimental…Yet all have one rare, creative thing: a directness of impression that makes them glow with life, small-scale life though it is.

Literary critic Ralph Thompson]in "Books of the Times" review of September 21, 1938 registers a number of complaints concerning the volume:

The callous Mr. Steinbeck, describing a coldblooded shooting ("The Murder") or a fatal manhunt ("Flight"), is impressive but artificial. The cunning Mr. Steinbeck, dealing with sex symbols ("The Snake") and feminine neuroses ("The White Quail"), is artificial and not impressive…"St. Katy the Virgin" is all right but something of a shock. It is quite as though Ernest Hemingway had come forth with an Uncle Remus story.

Writing in the New Statesman (February 18, 1939) critic John Mair notes a "directness of feeling and expression that is coming to be regarded as distinctively American" in this collection. He adds: "Mr. Steinbeck is not a great writer—he has too little passion for that, and his mind seems too observant to be really creative—but in his own way he is as perfect a craftsman as Hemingway and his disciples."

== Sources ==
- DeMott, Robert. 1994. Notes on the Text and Chronology in John Steinbeck: Novels and Stories, 1932-1937. The Library of America. Notes/Notes on the Text pp. 1051–1067. ISBN 1-883011-01-9
- DeMott, Robert. 1996. Notes on the Text in John Steinbeck: The Grapes of Wrath and Other Writings, 1936-1941. The Library of America. Notes/Notes on the Text pp. 1051–1067. ISBN 1-883011-15-9
- French, Warren. 1975. John Steinbeck. Twayne Publishers, Boston, Massachusetts. G. K. Hall & Co. ISBN 0-8057-0693-3
- French, Warren. 1979. John Steinbeck: A Usable Concept of Naturalism from American Literary Naturalism: A Reassessment (1975) in John Steinbeck: Modern Critical Views. 1979, Harold Bloom, editor. Chelsea House Publishers, New York. ISBN 0-87754-635-5
- Gide, Andre. 1944. Books: "Gide Fad." Time Magazine, March 6, 1944.https://content.time.com/time/subscriber/article/0,33009,774877,00.html Retrieved 5 February 2024.
- Hughes, Richard. S. 1987. Beyond the Red Pony: A Reader's Companion to Steinbeck's Complete Short Stories. The Scarecrow Press, Mutuchen, New Jersey & London. ISBN 0-8108-1970-8
- Hughes, Richard S. 1989. John Steinbeck: A Study of the Short Fiction. Twayne Publishers, Boston, Massachusetts. G. K. Hall & Co. ISBN 0-8057-8302-4
- Steinbeck, John. 1996. John Steinbeck: The Grapes of Wrath and Other Writings, 1936-1941. The Library of America, Robert DeMott, notes and Elaine A. Steinbeck, consultant. pp. 5–205 ISBN 1-883011-15-9
- Hayashi, Tetsumaro. 1975. Preface to A Study Guide to Steinbeck's The Long Valley. 1976. The Pierian Press, Ball State University, Tetsumaro Hayashi, editor. ISBN 0-87650-074-2
- Busch, Christopher S. "Longing for the Lost Frontier: Steinbeck's Vision of Cultural Decline in 'The White Quail' and 'The Chrysanthemums'." Steinbeck Quarterly 26.03-04 (Summer/Fall 1993): 81–90.
- Pellow, C. Kenneth. "'The Chrysanthemums' Revisited." Steinbeck Quarterly 22.01-02 (Winter/Spring 1989): 8–16.
- Renner, Stanley. "Mary Teller and Sue Bridehead: Birds of a Feather in 'The White Quail' and Jude the Obscure." Steinbeck Quarterly 18.01-02 (Winter/Spring 1985): 35–45.
- Renner, Stanley. "Sexual Idealism and Violence in 'The White Quail'." Steinbeck Quarterly 17.03-04 (Summer/Fall 1985): 76–87.
- Ware, Elaine. "Struggle for Survival: Parallel Theme and Techniques in Steinbeck's 'Flight' and Norris's 'McTeague'." Steinbeck Quarterly 21.03-04 (Summer/Fall 1988): 96–103.
- Kohzadi, Hamedreza. "The Marriage of Hysteria and Feminism in John Steinbeck's The Chrysanthemums: Elisa Allen as a Married but Virgin Feminist Homosexual Hysteric." Interdisciplinary Literary Studies 20.4 (2018): 429–469.https://www.jstor.org/stable/10.5325/intelitestud.20.4.0429
