= The Pastures of Heaven =

1932 short story cycle by John Steinbeck

- 1932 first edition cover art
- Publisher: Brewer, Warren and Putnam
- Publication date: January 1, 1932
- Media type: Print (hardback)
- Pages: 160
- OCLC: 471875236

The Pastures of Heaven is a short story cycle by John Steinbeck published by Brewer, Warren and Putnam in 1932.

This episodic collection is composed of ten self-contained but related stories set in the Corral de Tierra of the Salinas Valley of California.

The Pastures of Heaven was said by one critic "to rival The Long Valley (1938) as Steinbeck's major achievement in short fiction".

== Short story cycle: Chapters I-XII ==
The stories are presented here as per literary critics Richard. S. Hughes and Warren French. For clarity, the focal character is listed with the numerical section, as per Hughes.

- Chapter I (Prologue)
- Chapter II ("George Battle")
- Chapter III ("Shark Wicks")
- Chapter IV ("Tularecito")
- Chapter V ("Helen Van Deventer")
- Chapter VI ("Junius Maltby")
- Chapter VII ("The Lopez Sisters")
- Chapter VIII ("Molly Morgan")
- Chapter IX ("Raymond Banks")
- Chapter X ("Pat Humbert")
- Chapter XI ("The Whitesides")
- Chapter XII (Epilogue)

== Reception ==
Characterizing The Pastures of Heaven as a collection of short stories rather than a novella, Saturday Review (November 26, 1932), praises Steinbeck for an aptitude that promises "richly human fiction" limited by merely "journalistic talent rather than of a creative imagination".

Critic Anita Moffet in The New York Times Book Review, November 20, 1932, reports Steinbeck conveys "deep feeling for the tragedy implicit in each situation…his writing is noteworthy for originality of phrase and image and a strongly poetic feeling".

The Nation in its "Shorter Notices" section (December 7, 1932) remarks on the dichotomous structure of the book - "Not really a novel, nor yet a book of short stories", - and classifies the stories as "sketches". Praising the collection's "excellent analytical narratives, written in supple prose", the review closes with this caveat: "If Steinbeck could add social insight to his present equipment he would be a first-rate novelist". Literary critic Joseph R. McElrath Jr. reports that the book "received a majority of positive reviews acknowledging the young writer's promise".

== Background ==
As early as May, 1931 Steinbeck reported that he was at work on a "series of related stories". In a letter to his agent Mavis McIntosh at McIntosh & Otis, Steinbeck wrote: "The manuscript is made up of stories, each one complete in itself, having its rise, climax and ending. Each story deals with a family or an individual."

The stories are based largely on a local Salinas Valley family, the Morans, whose history and character Steinbeck knew well. The Morans appear as the 'Munroes" in The Pastures of Heaven cycle and provide a "connecting link" for the narratives.

Steinbeck completed the manuscript in December 1931. The publication of the book was complicated by a number of publisher bankruptcies. and was finally released by Brewer, Warren and Putnam in late 1932.

== Form and structure ==
The Pastures of Heaven, The Red Pony (1933) and Tortilla Flat (1935) are story-cycles not in the formal sense in that they incorporate anecdotes that can be separately read with pleasure into a loose framework that gives them additional meaning .... — Biographer Warren French in John Steinbeck (1975)

The organization of the book's narrative into ten "chapters" has elicited commentary among critics. Biographer Warren French writes: "Argument still continues as to whether The Pastures of Heaven is a 'novel' at all or simply a loosely related collection of short stories."

As a series of "autonomous stories" The Pastures of Heaven may be classified with "short-story cycles" comparable to Sherwood Anderson's Winesburg, Ohio (1919) or William Faulkner's The Unvanquished (1938). As such, the tales which are simply presented numerically by Roman numerals, "can stand by themselves" as works of short fiction.

Steinbeck's fiction includes "short story cycles" in which the stories may be "highly unified" as in his novel-like Tortilla Flat (1935), or only loosely associated, as in The Red Pony (1933) comprising only three stories.

The Pastures of Heaven was conceived by Steinbeck as a short story cycle. The unifying device is the presence of a single family residing in the valley, the Munroes, who appear, often as a physical link, in all the tales.

Literary critic Robert S. Hughes Jr. emphasizes that the Munroe family exerts a passive, but often decisive influence, serving as "the catalyst but not the true cause of the downfall of several of their unsuspecting neighbors". The collection is also marked by an adamant irony that appears in the title itself, as well as the prologue and epilogue. Hughes writes:

The title's irony stems from the word heaven, which suggests a celestial realm where the righteous dwell in perfect harmony. Ironically, Steinbeck's earthly "heaven" hosts nearly every conceivable human imperfection; consequently, discord spreads among the inhabitants.

== Theme ==
Biographer Warren French locates the key thematic element in "the heavy use of the kind of irony" that was encouraged by "New Critics" of the 1930s. The narratives place emphasis on the disparity between the aspirations of Steinbeck's protagonists and their "frustrating fulfillments".

In a May, 1931 letter to literary agent Mavis McIntosh, Steinbeck explained how devise the setting and thematic material for his story cycle:

There is, about twelve miles from Monterey, a valley in the hills called Corral de Tierra [earthen corridor]. Because I am using its people I have named it Las Paturas del Cielo. The valley was for years known as a happy valley because of the unique harmony which existed among its twenty families. About ten years ago a new family moved in on one of the ranches. They were ordinary people, ill-educated but honest and as kindly as any. In fact in there whole history I cannot find that they have committed a really malicious act...but about the Morans ['Munroes' in Pastures] there was a flavor of evil. Everyone they came in contact with was injured. Every place they went dissension sprang up…

== Plot summaries and analysis ==
=== Chapter I ===
During the early pastoral period of California colonial occupation in 1776, a Spanish corporal and his mounted troopers pursue and capture a group of Indians - fugitive slaves from the Carmelo mission. En route, the corporal is enchanted by a lovely and verdant valley he dubs Las Pasturas del Cielo; he vows to return and settle there. The corporal contracts syphilis from an Indian concubine and suffers slow death before he can fulfill his dream. The valley remains unclaimed.

The prologue establishes the "ironic premise" that informs the subsequent stories. The Eden-like landscape is juxtaposed with the "misfortune and tragedy" suffered by subsequent inhabitants of the valley. Warren French writes: "[T]he defeat of [the corporal's] dreams established the pattern for the tales constituting the book, which become - through the presence of the Munroe family - a novel than simply a collection of short stories."

=== Chapter II ===
The idyllic valley was gradually occupied by settlers in the mid-19th century. George Battle, age 18, fleeing the military draft. buys land and marries. His wife, a "religious fanatic and epileptic", bears a son: she is soon committed to an insane asylum. A succession of owners subsequently take possession of the parcel, each suffering a violent or mysterious fate. The Battle ranch earns a reputation as inherently evil. When Bert Munroe acquires the land, he and his young family appear to rehabilitate the reputation of the property among the community. Their very normalcy and innocence portends a revival of the Battle ranch curse.

The revival of sinister effects of the ranch are foreshadowed in Steinbeck's brief portraits of the Munroe family members. Now prosperous, Bert, his wife Mrs. Munroe and their teenage children, Mae and Jimmie, inadvertently intrude into the affairs of their neighbors. Community-minded and generally well-meaning, their behavior is frequently destabilizing and destructive to the most vulnerable residents of the valley.

=== Chapter III ===
Edward "Shark" Wicks, his wife Katherine and their daughter Alice subsist on a very modest income from their farm produce.. Alice is strikingly beautiful and innocent. Though never abusive, Shark secretly covets her as he would a valuable art object. Fearing suitors, he constantly inquires about her "condition" provoking exasperation in Katherine. Shark has cultivated a reputation among his neighbors as an investment wizard and a miser who conceals his riches. He maintains a make-believe ledger through which he "manages" his fortune. The seventeen-year-old Jimmie Munroe, styling himself a "casanova" attempts to seduce Alice at a local party and steals a kiss: gossip ensues. Shark flies into a near homicidal rage, suspecting his daughter has been deflowered. He advances on the Munroe home with a loaded rifle in search of Jimmie, but is intercepted by a deputy sheriff. Bert Munroe hysterically accuses Shark of attempted murder. The bond hearing reveals that Shark is virtually penniless, exposing the myth of his purported wealth and business acumen. Shattered and shamed, his wife finds a new strength in herself to face the family's disgrace. Shark rallies at Katherine's faith in his potential to be a genuine success. The family leaves the valley forever.

Biographer Robert S. Hughes Jr. ranks the Shark Wicks narrative among the finest in the collection. The brief, yet revealing emergence of Katherine Wick's sense of self in her husband's moment of truth is a key thematic element in the tale. Hughes cites this passage:

Suddenly the genius in Katherine became powerful and gushed in her body and flooded her. In a moment she knew what she was and what she could do. She was exultantly happy and beautiful.

Warren French suggests that the Wicks family "may have been served by the destruction of an illusion" thereby freeing Shark, Katherine and Alice from their stultifying existence in the valley.

=== Chapter IV ===
Tularecito or "little frog" is a physically deformed man-child. Abandoned in infancy, he is raised by a local ranch owner. Even as a little boy he possesses immense physical strength. A superb farm worker, he is particularly skilled at caring for animals. He is normally passive and tractable: his only outbursts occur when his handiwork is molested. Tularecito begins to attend school at age eleven. Though lacking any aptitude for reading and writing, he reveals an extraordinary talent for drawing highly naturalistic and accurate images of local animals on the chalkboard. When he finds his creations erased in the morning, he flies into a rage; the traumatized teacher resigns. A new instructor, Miss Morgan, recognizes Tularecito's special needs and encourages them. She introduces him to fairy tales; he is particularly fascinated by the habits of gnomes. Lacking any intimate human relationships, Tularecito comes to believe that these mythical beings are members of his own race. Wishing to assuage his loneliness, he embarks on a quest to discover the Gnome's cave-dwellings. His search leads him to Bert Munroe's orchard, where he begins digging a tunnel at the base of a peach tree. He returns the next day to find Bert filling in the hole. Infuriated, Tularecito beats Bert senseless with the shovel. When a group of local men arrive to investigate they subdue him after a violent struggle. Tularecito is committed to an asylum for the criminally insane.

The fate of gnome-like Tularecito is virtually preordained. The residents of The Pastures of the Valley, with few exceptions, find the "little frog" socially repulsive. Miss Morgan is responsible for encouraging his futile search for allies that do not exist; the Munroes, in this instance, are not culpable. Critic French places Tularecito in the same category as William Faulkner's Benjy Compson in The Sound and the Fury (1929) and Steinbeck's Lennie in Of Mice and Men (1937).

=== Chapter V ===
Helen Van Deventer is a wealthy widow. Her husband was killed in a hunting accident. Pregnant, she gave birth to a daughter, Hilda, six months later. A sickly but pretty child, the girl began to exhibit violent, destructive tendencies in her infancy. The family doctor advised Helen to seek psychiatric treatment for her daughter. She opted to endure rather than seek a cure. The doctor is exasperated by the mother's callousness. Hilda begins to report elaborate and bizarre dreams. She hints that a man is trying to abduct her. At thirteen she runs away and is found days later in Los Angeles. Increasingly delusional and violent, the doctor advises the now-adolescent to be placed in an asylum. The mother refuses, content to play the martyr. Helen moves with her daughter and servants to a custom built house in Pastures of Heaven. Bert Munroe, inquisitive like the other locals, takes a walk to the new estate. He hears a girl screaming from a second floor window; she tells Bert she is being starved. He knocks on the front door to investigate, but is turned away repeatedly by the butler and returns home disgusted. When Helen is informed that a strange man has spoken to Hilda, she is alarmed. Helen discovers that Hilda has escaped from the house after nightfall. She removes a rifle from her husband's collection and ventures outside. She locates her daughter near a stream and murders her, later positioning the rifle to make the death appear as a suicide. No one, not even the family doctor, suspects Helen of homicide.

Helen Van Deventer, who suffers from mental illness—like her daughter Hilda—is distinguished from the intellectually deficient Tularecito in that she is immune from the consequences of his madness. Wealthy and intelligent, she indulges in sado-masochism and declines to relinquish it. Bert Munroe's involvement in precipitating the murder is entirely coincidental, though decisive.

=== Chapter VI ===
The 35-year old Junius Maltby, a bank clerk, moves to The Pastures of Heaven and marries the widow from whom he rents a room on a small ranch. Junius proves to be utterly inept as a farmer, and after several years the property is in disrepair. Notwithstanding, he is entirely content to spend the day reading histories and literature. Shortly after his wife gives birth to a son, she dies in the Influenza pandemic of 1918. Julius raises the child alone. Julius engages a German immigrant laborer; as lazy as his employer, the two men engage in endless philosophical discussions. The boy, Robbie, grows up half-wild but enjoys his father's affection and literary knowledge.

When Robbie turns five, the school board demands he attend kindergarten, despite his father's objections. The children take note of the boy's ragged clothes and unkempt hair, but his openness and composure impress them. Intellectually precocious, Robbie organizes the younger boys into the Boy Auxiliaries. Miss Morgan, the teacher, discovers that, though highly articulate, the boy does not know how to write. She is intrigued, and visits the Maltby farm. Miss Morgan is charmed by Junius' erudition and eccentricities. The board notes Robbie's shabby overalls, and presents him with a charity gift of clothing: Robbie bolts from the room in anger and shame. Bert Munroe and his spouse compound the insult by visiting Junius and chastising him. Humiliated and stigmatized, father and son abandon the farm and move to the city.

Robbie is named after Robert Louis Stevenson, one his father's favorite authors. The thematic center of the story is based in a line from Stevenson: "There is nothing so monstrous that we can believe it of ourselves." As such, Junius submits to the judgment of Mrs. Munroe and her "respectable" neighbors: Robbie must be saved from his own father's neglect. Shamed, Junius and Robbie are symbolically "evicted from the Garden of Eden". In 1936, Steinbeck retitled the story "Nothing So Monstrous" and added an epilogue in which father and son resume their idyllic life in the Pastures.

This story was later included in certain editions of The Red Pony as published in 1938.

=== Chapter VII ===
The adult daughters of Guiermo Lopez find themselves destitute after their father dies. They decide to open a small restaurant in their roadside house. Confident of their culinary talents, they have high hopes of drawing a loyal clientele. Business languishes. When Maria returns to the restaurant after a day of shopping, she finds her older sister sullen and remote. Rosa confesses that she provided a sexual favor to a male customer simply for patronizing the establishment. The sisters weep and embrace. Maria, in solidarity with Rosa, declares that she too will likewise encourage the customers. The sisters together ask forgiveness from the Holy Virgin. Business improves among the male clientele. The cheerful sisters maintain the fiction that they operate a restaurant, not a bordello. Husbands keep mum, but the Lopez sisters are shunned by local wives. When Maria travels to town in her horse-drawn carriage, she encounters Allen Hueneker. Short, ugly and ape-like, he suffers from low self-esteem; his wife dominates and disparages him. Allen accepts Maria's offer to take him to the bus stop. The pair are spotted by Mr. and Mrs. Bert Munroe. Bert jokingly reports the sighting to Mrs Hueneker. That evening Maria returns home to find Rosa in tears: the sheriff visited that afternoon and has shut down the restaurant, terming it a "bad house". Sobbing, Rosa announces she will move to San Francisco and become "a bad woman"; Maria pledges to join her.

"The Lopez Sisters" lacks the "central irony" of the other stories in the cycle: the sisters have no expectation of harvesting the natural bounty of the Pastures. Bert Munroe's gratuitous "practical joke" precipitates their departure, but does nothing to undermine their self-delusions as prostitutes. The "light, humorous" and Maupassant-like quality lacks the tragic dimensions of the other stories. Originally part of a play "The Green Lady", Steinbeck intended to include the episode in To a God Unknown (1933), but revised it for Pastures. Critic Richard S. Hughes judges it "one of the less successful pieces in the book".

=== Chapter VIII ===
Molly Morgan, just graduated from the teachers college, has arrived in the valley to interview for a position as a school teacher. Innocent and sensitive, Molly suffers from the effects of an impoverished childhood and the long absences of her much-beloved and alcoholic father, George Morgan. Molly's mother died after a protracted illness, and her father's whereabouts is now unknown. Molly considers herself an orphan. George Morgan's short, intermittent visits to the household loom large in Molly's perceptions of her father. She recalls him as a romantic figure, an adventurer, almost legendary in stature. He has not returned for years.The Pastures of Heaven school board welcomes Molly as the new teacher. She has a rewarding teaching career ahead of her. Molly's vulnerability stems from her illusions regarding her father: she dreads abandoning her storybook illusions and admitting to herself his true character. When a member of the school board, Bert Munroe, begins publicly disparaging the drunken behavior of his recently hired ranch hand, Molly begins to panic: could this disreputable figure be her father? Declining to inquire as to the man's identity, the mere possibility that he might be George Morgan induces Molly to resign and flee the valley to avoid abandoning her illusions.

The "well-made" plot offers a "composite picture" of Molly's painful and lonely youth, revealing her neurotic worship of a delinquent and alcoholic father. Molly's delusional, infantile fantasies concerning the absent George Morgan and terror at confronting the truth; more troubling because her flight from the Pastures indicates that "she knew new her father's real character". According to French, Bert Munroe's role is especially pernicious: "[H]is crude humor becomes a cruel weapon" which leads to the departure "of an innocent, sensitive girl who is an unqualified asset to the community that loves her".

=== Chapter IX ===
Raymond Banks owns and single-handedly operates the most admired farm in the valley. The farm is well-cultivated and his poultry operation clean and efficient. Community-minded and generous, he is particularly popular with the children, playing Santa Claus at the school Christmas parties. His only eccentricity, and a troubling one to many locals, is that he occasionally attends hangings at the San Quentin as a guest of the warden. Bert Munroe and his family have recently occupied the old Banks property in the valley. A newcomer, Bert is deeply troubled when he learns of Banks' excursions. Bert begs Banks to procure a pass to accompany him to an execution. Banks is hesitant, but makes arrangements for them. Bert abruptly refuses the invitation: Banks is perplexed. Rather than simply decline, Bert proceeds to justify his distaste for executions, disgorging a bizarre childhood memory of witnessing an inept butchering of a chicken by a neighbor. He adds that he knew of a hanging in which the victim was decapitated. When Banks attempts to reassure him, Bert becomes almost hysterical in predicting the horrifying effects the experience would have on him and ridiculing Banks for lacking a heathy imagination. Banks, indignant, has nothing but contempt for Bert's outburst and departs. This personal attack has sickened him and he decides to cancel his trip to San Quentin.

The story is steeped in irony. Though lacking in empathy, Banks is neither cruel nor morbid: his desire to observe hangings is a vicarious means of experiencing profound emotion through the reactions of others who also witness the execution. This is indicative of "serious voids in his character" that fall short of perversity. Bert Munroe, in contrast, has a lurid curiosity in hangings, but lacks the courage to witness them. Rather than paying Banks, Bert has an ulterior motive: "He quite deliberately sets out to destroy another man's illusions in order to protect his own." Steinbeck finds Banks' limited grasp of the enormity of death benign compared to Munroe's morbid fascination, which he conceals under his self-righteousness.

=== Chapter X ===
Pat Humbert, an only child, lives with his mother and father. Cruel taskmasters, they treat him more as a hired servant than a son. When Pat is thirty, they die. Finally free from parental tyranny, he seeks companionship in formal social activities: the school board, the Masons, and the Odd Fellows but forms no intimate friendships. Pat produces fine crops, accumulating sizable savings. He resides alone in the farmhouse, limiting his living area to the kitchen - the rest of the rooms fall into disrepair. A homely and ill-educated man, Pat at 40 appears to be a confirmed bachelor. An enormous white Banksia rose tree engulfs the farmhouse. Mrs. Munroe and her very pretty daughter, 20-year-old Mae, stroll by the property. Admiring the roses, Mae remarks that the farmhouse reminds her of a picture postcard of a lovely Vermont country home: perhaps Mr. Humbert will allow her to see the interior. Undetected by the women, Pat overhears her. An obsession takes hold of him, and he begins to vigorously remodel the interior of the house in the Vermont style. He orders custom made facsimiles of Vermont furniture. Pat has vivid fantasies of ushering Mae into the house and witnessing her delight. When Pat musters up enough courage to visit the Munroe home to invite Mae, he is informed by her father that she is engaged to a local boy, Bill Whiteside. Shattered by the news, Pat returns home and sleeps in the hay loft.

Literary critic Richard S. Hughes praises the story for its "compact and tight organization…the narrative contains carefully-wrought imagery, reinforcing the mood of the various scenes". Pat Humbert, as one of the most vulnerable denizens of The Pasture of Heaven, finds his suffering compounded by contact with the Munroe family. His difficulty originates primarily from his own unhappy family history. Unable to forge an independent identity after the passing of his "hateful" parents, he remains a social outsider. His delusional fantasy that Mae Munroe might be his wife moves him to action: he vigorously dismantles the interior of the house that his domineering parents had occupied for decades, an act of liberation. When Mae is betrothed to another, Pat is doomed to revert to his former self, haunted by the ghosts of his mother and father.

=== Chapter XI ===
Richard Whiteside arrives in The Pastures of Heaven from New England after his father's estate burns down; he is determined to revive the family fortunes by establishing a "dynasty" in the Pastures of Heaven that will endure for many generations. He builds a grand house and marries Alicia, both expecting to produce a large family. Richard sires but one child, John. John, in turn, marries Willa and, again, produces only a son, William. Though the farm proves highly profitable and the Whitesides are well-regarded in the community, Richard Whiteside's dynastic vision never materializes. The handsome house is accidentally burned to the ground during a prescribed burn, and his grandson William marries a local woman, Mae Munroe, and they move to the city.

Literary critic Warren French notes the similarity of this "tragic theme of the destruction of the dream of founding a dynasty" with that of Faulkner's Absalom, Absalom! (year)". Richard S. Hughes identifies four symbols associated with the Whiteside mansion: the white paint that perpetually covers the house; the New England style slate roof; the sitting room with its bookshelf containing the works of Herodotus, Xenophon, and Thucidydes; and especially the Meerschaum pipe and its successive color transformations. In terms of the irony that Steinbeck's inserts into every story, the fiery inferno that consumes the Whiteside house is entirely predictable: "We are prepared for it from the very beginning of the tale." Hughes points out that, contrary to the other stories in the cycle, the Whiteside tragedy requires no meddling from the Munroe family.

=== Chapter XII ===
The chapter serves to bookend the collection: sightseers gaze longingly on the golden and fertile valley, each imagining the wonderful gifts it might hold for them. The reader is fully aware that the valley has been the site of "misfortune and tragedy" of which the tourists are utterly ignorant.

The epilogue balances the prologue, thus "completing the ironic frame of the volume".

== Adaptations ==
A stage adaptation of The Pastures of Heaven done as a collaboration between the California Shakespeare Theater and Word for Word Performing Art Company (a company that stages short stories literally word for word) premiered in Orinda, California, in June 2010. The script was by Octavio Solis, and it was directed by California Shakespeare Theater's artistic director Jonathan Moscone.

== Sources ==
- DeMott, Robert. 1996. Notes on the Text in John Steinbeck: The Grapes of Wrath and Other Writings, 1936-1941. The Library of America. Notes/Notes on the Text pp. 1051-1067. ISBN 1-883011-15-9
- French, Warren. 1975. John Steinbeck. Twayne Publishers, Boston, Massachusetts. G. K. Hall & Co. ISBN 0-8057-0693-3
- French, Warren. 1979. "John Steinbeck: A Usable Concept of Naturalism from American Literary Naturalism: A Reassessment" (1975) in John Steinbeck: Modern Critical Views. 1979, Harold Bloom, editor. Chelsea House Publishers, New York. ISBN 0-87754-635-5
- Hughes, Richard. S.. 1987. Beyond the Red Pony: A Reader's Companion to Steinbeck's Complete Short Stories. The Scarecrow Press, Mutuchen, New Jersey & London. ISBN 0-8108-1970-8
- Hughes, Richard. S.. 1989. John Steinbeck: A Study of the Short Fiction. Twayne Publishers, Boston, Massachusetts. G. K. Hall & Co. ISBN 0-8057-8302-4
- Steinbeck, John. 1996. John Steinbeck: The Grapes of Wrath and Other Writings, 1936–1941. The Library of America, Robert DeMott, notes and Elaine Anderson Steinbeck, consultant. ISBN 1-883011-15-9
