= The Raid (Steinbeck story) =

- Short story by John Steinbeck
- Country: United States
- Language: English

Publication
- Publisher: the North American Review
- Media type: Print
- Publication date: October 1934

“The Raid” is a work of short fiction by John Steinbeck originally published in The North American Review, October 1934. The story was first collected in The Long Valley (1938) by Viking Press.

== Plot ==
“The Raid” is told from a third-person omniscient point-of-view.

Two socialist labor organizers are walking to a secret worker's meeting at night near a packing plant. The streets are ill-lit and the industrial sector is dystopian. Dick is middle-aged and an experienced agitator and spokesman for the party leadership. Root, much younger (“underage” at 17), is genuine in his support for the party, but utterly inexperienced. This is his first appearance to make an address to workers. Dick quickly discerns that Root is suffering from apprehension about his presentation. More troubling, it is clear that the young socialist fears the consequences if company thugs are tipped off about the meeting. In that case, both organizers can expect a severe beating, or worse. Dick admonishes Root: “If you’re scared you got no business here.”

They arrive at an abandoned dry goods store. Root hangs a number of propaganda posters on the walls and arranges pamphlets on a table. The men discover that the oil lamps they brought are low on fuel, an oversight by Root. Dick, annoyed by his comrade's carelessness, chastnes him, but assures Root he will master his nervousness. An hour passes, but no one arrives; then a worker runs into the room. He tells the socialists that the factory workers decided to boycott the meeting and allow them to be apprehended by a “raiding party”—a gang of company thugs who are approaching the store. Dick tells the informer to save himself and the man flees. As a party loyalist, Dick knows that he and Root must remain steadfast: the party requires that its cadre exhibit courage in the face of abuse as an example to workers - “We gotta take it” intones Dick. Fear of being beaten begins to obsess Root; he reflects on the kind of grotesque injuries he might suffer from homicidal union-busters. Dick, increasingly severe, steadies the boy.

The raiders burst into the room and surround the two men. Dick steadily regards Root, accessing his demeanor. Suddenly, Root steps forward, and addresses the men as “Comrades.” When he declares his solidarity with them, he is instantly struck savagely on the side of his head with a two-by-four. Falling down to his knees, he rises again. His fervor ignited, and begins an ardent appeal to his tormentors: his final glimpse at Dick reveals that the older man is smiling approvingly at him.

Root and Dick are both brutally beaten. Root regains consciousness in a hospital cell in a jail: his face and head are swathed in bloody bandages. Dick has a broken arm and rib. The socialists have been charged with inciting a riot and sentenced to six months in jail. Dick heaps praise on Root: the young socialist has acted honorably. Root has an epiphany. Endowed with a martyr-like moral clarity, the boy utters a garbled scripture quote from the Luke: 23:24 : “Forgive them for they don’t know what they're doing.” Dick instantly admonishes Root's biblical reference: “Lay off the religious stuff” adding “religion is the opium of the people, Karl Marx’s famous dictum.

== Background ==
“The Raid” is distinguished as an early example of Steinbeck's interest in contemporary social issues, in particular, the often violent labor struggles of the Great Depression. The story is the first in which Steinbeck addressed the farm labor issue in California. These investigative efforts would inform several of his early novels, including In Dubious Battle (1936), Of Mice and Men (1937) and The Grapes of Wrath (1939).

The character of Root is likely based on young strike organizer and Dust Bowl migrant Cecil McKiddy. The fictional Root wears a “a turtle-neck blue sweater” just as McKiddy reportedly wore while supporting striking farm workers. The older character, Dick, is modeled on “the veteran communist organizers” such as Pat Chambers and Shorty Alston.

== Critical appraisal ==
As fiction, “The Raid” exhibits Steinbeck's talent at creating suspense. Underscoring the “psychological and political context” are temporal and aural devices. The passage of time is repeatedly referred to by the nervous Root. As the encounter with the goon squad looms, the motif is repeatedly applied, and Root's dread becomes almost unbearable. Unrelated sounds emanating from the dark - a train whistle, a dog barking, the rumble of a distant automobile - also add suspense, emphasizing the isolation of the two men stranded in the deserted building awaiting their fate.

Biographer Peter Lisca ranks “The Raid” as among the finest of the stories in The Long Valley, adding “‘The Raid’ has not been sufficiently noted for its accomplishments.” The work is notable for its unusually “tight structure…perhaps the sparsest in Steinbeck’s use of material.”

== Theme ==
The quasi-religious overtones of the labor organizers is the well-spring of their imperviousness to physical suffering. In the following exchange between the veteran organizer, Dick, and the novice, Root, Dick attempts to instill courage in the 17-year-old communist before an imminent assault by company thugs:

I don’t know much, but I been through this mill before. I can tell you this for sure. When it comes - it won’t hurt. I don’t know why, but it won’t. Even if they kill you it won’t hurt.”

After the ordeal, the brutally beaten and hospitalized Root acknowledges the truth of Dick's promise: “It didn’t hurt, Dick. It was funny. I felt all full up - and good.”

=== The rite of initiation and Christian imagery ===
Critic Peter Lisca detects an equivalence between the American communist party leadership of the 1930s and religious martyrs: “[L]ike the disciples of the early days of Christianity, Steinbeck’s labor organizers suffer persecution at the hands of those whom they would save.”

Literary critic M. R. Satyanarayana has classified “The Raid” as essentially a Coming-of-age story or “initiation” story in which Root is the novice and Dick his mentor and guide to revelation: “[A]n excellent example of a sociological initiation, in which the boy hero is initiated to an altogether new social order.” Satyanarayana enumerates the steps in a classic initiation and right-of-passage:

(1) the hero’s severance from the mother
(2) the revelation of the mystery of adult experience
(3) the ordeal
(4) symbolic death and rebirth.

Root has already been rejected by his family for his radical political views. His decision to join the communists in an effort to educate and organize workers introduces him into adult experience. The ordeal of facing and enduring adversity is met and survived. Here, Root's transformation “becomes a re-enactment of Christ’s death and resurrection. Root’s plea to his attackers—“you don’t know what you’re doing”—is a paraphrase of Jesus Christ's plea from the holy cross: “Father, forgive them; for they know not what they do.” (Mark 23:24).

Steinbeck would revisit and expand his treatment of this theme with the character of a former pastor and socialist labor organizer Jim Casy in The Grapes of Wrath (1939).

== Sources ==
- DeMott, Robert. 1996. Notes on the Text and Chronology in John Steinbeck: The Grapes of Wrath and Other Writings, 1936-1941. The Library of America. Notes/Notes on the Text pp. 1051–1067. ISBN 1-883011-15-9
- French, Warren. 1975. John Steinbeck. Twayne Publishers, Boston, Massachusetts. G. K. Hall & Co. ISBN 0-8057-0693-3
- Hughes, Richard S. 1987. Beyond the Red Pony: A Reader’s Companion to Steinbeck’s Complete Short Stories. The Scarecrow Press, Mutuchen, New Jersey & London. ISBN 0-8108-1970-8
- Hughes, R. S.. 1989. John Steinbeck: A Study of the Short Fiction. Twayne Publishers, Boston, Massachusetts. G. K. Hall & Co. ISBN 0-8057-8302-4
- Lisca, Peter. 1976. “‘The Raid’ and In Dubious Battle” in A Study Guide to Steinbeck’s The Long Valley. 1976. The Pierian Press, Ball State University, Tetsumaro Hayashi, editor. pp. 41–45 ISBN 0-87650-074-2
- Steinbeck, John. 1996. John Steinbeck: The Grapes of Wrath and Other Writings, 1936-1941. The Library of America, Robert DeMott, notes and Elaine Anderson Steinbeck, consultant. ISBN 1-883011-15-9
- Satyanarayana, M. R. 1971. “And the Child Becomes a Man”: Three Initiation Stories of John Steinbeck, Indiana Journal of American Studies in John Steinbeck: A Study of the Short Fiction. 1989, Twayne Publishers, Boston, Massachusetts. G. K. Hall & Co. pp. 181–188. ISBN 0-8057-8302-4
