= The White Quail =

- Short story by John Steinbeck
- Country: United States
- Language: English

Publication
- Publisher: The North American Review
- Media type: Print
- Publication date: March 1935

“The White Quail” is a work of short fiction by John Steinbeck originally appearing in The North American Review, March 1935. The story was first collected in The Long Valley (1938) published by Viking Press.

== Plot ==
“The White Quail” is told in from a third-person omniscient point-of-view.

The petite, pretty, and soon to be Mrs. Mary Teller, predicates her choice for a husband on whether she considers him worthy of the garden she has determined will be the centerpiece of their new home. Her husband, businessman Harry E. Teller, indulges his wife, and Mary directs the landscaping and construction of the garden, which she proceeds to meticulously groom. Mary favors cinerarias, fuchsias trees. Beyond the garden on the hillside are native plants, growing wild—“very wild”—stands of Cascara bushes and poison oak. Increasingly obsessed with her garden, she resents any intruders who would threaten its sanctity. Parasitic insects and snails are exterminated with relish—enlisting her husband to perform the killing. She contemplates poisoning a cat she suspects is scaring away birds who use the garden's fountain. Even the “wild hill” beyond the garden she regards as sinister because it lacks the good order and discipline she imposes on her realm with which she closely identifies herself.

Mary questions the profit-oriented car loans at Harry's automobile sales lot. He is deeply troubled by her lack of faith in his integrity. When he seeks to elicit reassurance, she blithely dismisses his concern.

Mary has arranged the home so that the couple sleep in separate bedrooms. The door to her room can be locked from the inside. A locked door signals Harry that she is not interested in having sex. She knows when her husband quietly tests the locked door at night, and revels when he passively retreats, knowing that she has thwarted his sexual needs.

Harry longs to have a canine companion, and is overjoyed when he is offered an Irish terrier puppy by a neighbor. Knowing that Mary believes pet dogs habitually dig up gardens, he dutifully declines the gift.

When a white quail appears at the garden pond to drink, Mary welcomes the rare avian as a manifestation of herself, her essence. A stray cat appears and begins to stalk the white quail. Mary begins screaming hysterically. When Harry runs to her, she demands that poison be put out to destroy the cat. Harry emphatically refuses because the cat will suffer a slow, painful death: he consents to shoot the cat with a nonlethal deterrent round to scare it away. When Mary tells him of the white quail, Harry registers some skepticism, suggesting it might have been a pigeon. Mary becomes agitated, as if her own existence was being questioned, and regrets sharing her secret.

Early in the morning, Harry conceals himself in the garden. He discharges the airgun, but rather than hitting a cat, he kills the white quail. He furtively disposes of the tiny carcass in the wild woodlands beyond the garden. Returning to the house, he recognizes his own suffering and his utter alienation from his wife.

== Background ==
“The White Quail” was written between the spring of 1933 and the late summer of 1934, while Steinbeck and his spouse Carol Henning were caring for his ailing parents. Based on Steinbeck's personal notes in the original manuscript, literary critic R. S. Hughes reports that the family crisis created tensions in the couple's marital relationships that are reflected in the short story.

== Theme ==
Warren French writes that “Steinbeck is principally concerned with trying to create and condemn a person who has become so obsessed with realizing a dream that they become isolated from all normal human relationships.”

Literary critic Richard S. Hughes identifies a weakness in the story in that the symbolism is established too explicitly between Mary Teller and the rare, almost freakish, albino quail. Harry destroys the supreme symbol of Mary's “scrupulously tended” garden in that it represents his wife's denial of his sexual needs. Harry's natural impulses are comparable to the wild brush that threatens to encroach upon the garden and the hungry cat, both of which Mary finds offensive.

Literary critic Marilyn H. Mitchell considers Mary Teller “one of the most ruthless and egotistical of all Steinbeck’s characters” and critic Warren French describes Mary as “the most unattractive woman in Steinbeck’s fiction before the incredible Kate Trask in East of Eden (1952).”

=== Literary influence: Thomas Hardy’s Jude the Obscure ===
Literary critic Stanley Renner offers a brief comparative study between novelist Thomas Hardy’s Jude the Obscure (1895) and Steinbeck’s “The White Quail,” detecting a “direct influence” with regard to their female protagonists. Though the works differ greatly in scope, the portraits of Steinbeck's Mary Teller and Hardy's Sue Bridehead are “uncannily alike—in detailed resemblance, in attitude, and in the havoc they wreak in their relationship with men.” Their fear and loathing of carnal sexuality, emotional dissociation and narcissistic self-involvement emerge from a social context that encouraged the “idealization of womanhood itself.” Both works expose “the pernicious consequences of sexual idealism in male-female relationships.”

== Sources ==
- DeMott, Robert. 1996. Notes on the Text and Chronology in John Steinbeck: The Grapes of Wrath and Other Writings, 1936-1941. The Library of America. Notes/Notes on the Text pp. 1051–1067. ISBN 1-883011-15-9
- French, Warren. 1975. John Steinbeck. Twayne Publishers, Boston, Massachusetts. G. K. Hall & Co. ISBN 0-8057-0693-3
- Hughes, R. S.. 1989. John Steinbeck: A Study of the Short Fiction. Twayne Publishers, Boston, Massachusetts. G. K. Hall & Co. ISBN 0-8057-8302-4
- Mitchell, Marilyn H. 1979. “Steinbeck’s Strong Women: Feminine Identity in the Short Stories” from Steinbeck's Women: Essays in Criticism, Ball State University in John Steinbeck: A Study of the Short Fiction. Twayne Publishers, Boston, Massachusetts. G. K. Hall & Co. p. 29, pp. 154–166. ISBN 0-8057-8302-4
- Steinbeck, John. 1996. John Steinbeck: The Grapes of Wrath and Other Writings, 1936-1941. The Library of America, Robert DeMott, notes and Elaine Anderson Steinbeck, consultant. ISBN 1-883011-15-9
- Renner, Stanley. 1985. “Steinbeck and Thomas Hardy” Steinbeck Quarterly, Winter-Spring 1985 in Steinbeck’s Literary Dimension: A Guide to Comparative Studies, Series II. Tetsumaro Hayashi, editor. The Scarecrow Press, Mutuchen, New Jersey & London. pp. 15–27 ISBN 0-8108-0550-2
