= Chrysanthemum (disambiguation) =

A chrysanthemum is a flower.

Chrysanthemum also may refer to

== Books ==
- Chrysanthemum, a children's picture book by Kevin Henkes
- "The Chrysanthemums", a 1937 short story by John Steinbeck

== Film, television, and stage ==
- "Chrysanthemum", episode of I Spy
- "The Chrysanthemums", 1990 short film
- Chrysanthemum (1956), the British stage musical that inspired Thoroughly Modern Millie

== Music ==
- "Crisantemi", string quartet composition dating from 1890 by Puccini
- "The Chrysanthemum", piano composition by Scott Joplin
- "Chrysanthemum", a 2007 song by Kelley Polar
- "Chrysanthemum", a song by the Canadian band Download from Effector
- The Chrysanthemums (band), English art-pop group

== Other ==
- HMS Chrysanthemum (1917)
- Chrysanthemum (cocktail), a mixed alcoholic drink made with dry vermouth, Bénédictine, and absinthe
- Chrysanthemum Throne, the throne of the Emperor of Japan
- 9M123 Khrizantema, a Russian Anti-Tank guided missile
