= Dark Watchers =

Part of early California folklore

The Dark Watchers (also known by early Spanish settlers as Los Vigilantes Oscuros) is a name given to a group of entities in California folklore purportedly seen observing travelers along the Santa Lucia Mountains.

== Description ==
The Dark Watchers are described as tall, sometimes giant-sized, featureless dark silhouettes often adorned with brimmed hats or walking sticks. They are most often reported to be seen in the hours around twilight and dawn. They are said to motionlessly watch travelers from the horizon along the Santa Lucia Mountain Range. According to legend, no one has seen one up close and if someone were to approach them, they disappear.

== History ==
While sometimes attributed to the Chumash people who historically inhabited the central and southern coastal regions of California, nothing analogous to the legend appears to exist in their mythology. When Spanish settlers first moved into the area they were said to have witnessed the Dark Watchers whom they dubbed Los Vigilantes Oscuros.

The Dark Watchers are most famously given a brief mention in John Steinbeck's "Flight", included in the 1938 collection of his short stories The Long Valley:

"Pepé looked suspiciously back every minute or so, and his eyes sought the tops of the ridges ahead. Once, on a white barren spur, he saw a black figure for a moment; but he looked quickly away, for it was one of the dark watchers. No one knew who the watchers were, nor where they lived, but it was better to ignore them and never to show interest in them. They did not bother one who stayed on the trail and minded his own business."

Along with this, "watchers" are also referred to by poet Robinson Jeffers in the titular poem of his 1937 collection Such Counsels You Gave to Me & Other Poems:

...he thought it might be one of the watchers, who are often seen in this length of coast-range, forms that look human to human eyes, but certainly are not human. They come from behind ridges to watch. But when he approached it he recognized the shabby clothes and pale hair and even the averted forehead and concave line from the eye to the jaw, so that he was not surprised when the figure turning toward him in the quiet twilight showed his own face. Then it melted and merged into the shadows beyond it...

John Steinbeck's son Thomas Steinbeck would grow up to report having seen The Dark Watchers during his childhood and later along with artist Benjamin Brode collaborate on a book titled In Search of the Dark Watchers, where they go into the history of the legend and interview locals who claim to have seen them, such as famed Big Sur resident Billy Post.

According to newspaper archives in the mid-1960s, a Monterery Peninsula local and former high school principal went on a hiking trip in the Santa Lucias when he suddenly spotted a dark figure standing on a rock and surveying the area. When the principal called out to the other hikers, the creature vanished.

== Explanations ==
Illusions, hallucinations, or misinterpretation of natural stimuli brought on by exhaustion or isolation have been proposed by psychologists. Infrasound, which can be generated by wind, can cause feelings of uneasiness and anxiety in some people and is frequently connected to paranormal sightings.

An optical illusion known as the Brocken spectre is a plausible explanation for the legend. A Brocken spectre, also called a "mountain spectre", can occur in certain atmospheric conditions when the sun is at a particular angle. The subject's shadow can be cast onto a cloud bank around them, creating the illusion of a large shadowy humanoid figure.

== See also ==
- Grey Man of Ben Macdhui
- Shadow person
- Watcher (angel)
