= Robert O. Ballou =

Robert Oleson Ballou (1892 – 1977) was an American publisher and author.

He was a literary editor for the Chicago Daily News in the late 1920s and then became editor of the American office of the publisher Cape and Smith. He accepted John Steinbeck's manuscript of The Pastures of Heaven but Cape and Smith soon went bankrupt and Ballou moved to Brewer, Warren and Putnam, who published The Pastures of Heaven in 1932.

Ballou founded his own publishing company after being disappointed with the lack of success of Brewer, Warren and Putnam, and Steinbeck's 1933 novel To a God Unknown was published by Ballou. He nearly went bankrupt during the Great Depression and was disappointed with the sales of Steinbeck's novel. He decided not to publish Steinbeck's next novel, In Dubious Battle, and handed over the rights to the book to Pascal Covici of the publisher Covici–Friede.

== Works ==
- Goudy (Knopf, 1926).
- The Bible of the World, editor (New York: The Viking Press, 1939).
- This I Believe: A Letter to My Son (New York: The Viking Press, 1935).
- The Glory of God: A Letter to My Son (New York: Convici, Friede, 1938).
- Shinto: The Unconquered Enemy. Japan's Doctrine of Racial Superiority and World Conquest, With Selections from Japanese Texts (New York: The Viking Press, 1945).
- A History of the Council on Books in Wartime, 1942–1946 (Country Life Press, 1946).
- William James on Psychical Research, co-authored with Gardner Murphy (New York: The Viking Press, 1961).
