= Robert Ballou =

Robert Ballou may refer to:

- Robert S. Ballou, American lawyer and judge
- Robert O. Ballou, American publisher and author
