= The Red Pony =

Novel by John Steinbeck

- First book edition
- Author: John Steinbeck
- Language: English
- Genre: Regional slice of life
- Publisher: Covici Friede
- Publication date: 1937
- Publication place: United States
- Media type: Print (Paperback)

The Red Pony is an episodic novella written by American writer John Steinbeck in 1933. The first three chapters were published in magazines from 1933 to 1936. The full book was published in 1937 by Covici Friede. The stories in the book are tales of a boy named Jody Tiflin. The book has four stories about Jody and his life on his father's California ranch. Other main characters include Carl Tiflin – Jody's father; Billy Buck – an expert in horses and a working hand on the ranch; Mrs. Tiflin – Jody's mother; Jody's grandfather – Mrs. Tiflin's father, who has a history of crossing the Oregon Trail, and enjoys telling stories about his experiences; and Gitano – an old man who wishes to die at the Tiflin ranch. Along with these stories, there is a short story (taken from one of Steinbeck's earlier works, The Pastures of Heaven) at the end of the book titled "Junius Maltby". However, this last story is omitted in the edition published by Penguin Books.

== Plot ==
=== Chapter 1 – The Gift ===
The book's action begins when Carl Tiflin gives his son Jody a red pony colt. Overjoyed, Jody quickly agrees to all of the conditions his father places on the gift (to feed the pony, to clean his stall, etc.). Jody is so awed at the pony's magnificence that he decides to name him Gabilan, after the grassy and oak-dotted Gabilan Mountains that border the Salinas Valley ranch. After several weeks of training and getting to know Gabilan, Jody is told by his father that he will be allowed to ride the horse by Thanksgiving. Though the ranch hand Billy Buck assures him there would be no rain, the pony is caught in a downpour and catches what appears to be a cold after being left out to corral. Billy tries to cure the horse of its illness to no avail and finally diagnoses the illness as strangles, placing a steaming wet bag over the pony's muzzle and entrusting Jody to watch the pony. In the night, Jody becomes sleepy in spite of his constant worry and drifts off to sleep, forgetting about the open barn door. By the time he awakens, the pony has wandered out of the barn. When Billy arrives, he deems it necessary to cut a hole in the horse's windpipe so he can breathe. Jody stays by his side, constantly swabbing out the mucus that clogged the windpipe.

After falling asleep, Jody dreams of increasingly powerful winds and wakes up to see that the pony is gone again. Following the pony's trail he then notices a cloud of buzzards circling over a nearby spot. Unable to reach the horse in time, he arrives while a buzzard is eating the horse's eye. In his rage, Jody wrestles with the bird and beats it repeatedly, not stopping until he is pulled off by Billy Buck and his father, though the bird had long since died. The story overall deals with ideas regarding the fallibilities of adults and the entrance into manhood, and the inevitability of death for all living things.

"The Gift" was first published in the November 1933 issue of North American Review.

=== Chapter 2 – The Great Mountains ===
Jody gets bored. He looks at the great mountains, wishing he could explore them. Suddenly, an old Mexican man named Gitano appears, claiming he was born on the ranch. Gitano requests to stay on the farm until he dies. Carl Tiflin refuses, although he does allow him to stay the night, noting that the old man is very similar to his useless old horse, Easter. That night, Jody secretly visits Gitano. He is polishing his old rapier. Jody asks if he has ever been to the great mountains, and Gitano says he has but remembers little. The next morning Gitano is gone, as is Easter. Jody searches the old man's things, but is disappointed to find no trace of the sharp sword. A neighbor reports seeing Gitano riding the missing horse into the mountains with something in his hand. The adults assume that this is a gun but, as Jody seems to know, it is most likely the rapier. Jody's father wonders why the man has gone into the mountains and jokes that he saved him the trouble of burying the old horse. The story ends with Jody filled with longing and sorrow at thoughts of the old man, the rapier, and the mountains.

"The Great Mountains" was first published in the December 1933 issue of North American Review.

=== Chapter 3 – The Promise ===
Carl Tiflin thinks it is time for Jody to learn more responsibility, so he arranges for Jody to take the mare Nellie to be serviced at a neighbor's farm. The stud fee is five dollars and Jody works hard all summer to satisfy the five dollar credit his father held over him. After a few months, Billy Buck determines Nellie is pregnant.

While Jody and Billy take care of the mare, Billy states that his mother died in childbirth and he was raised on mares' milk. That's why Billy is supposed to be so good with horses. Jody dreams often about his coming foal. Billy explains that mares are more delicate than cattle and sometimes the foal has to be torn to pieces and removed to save the mare's life. This worries Jody. He thinks of his pony Gabilan, who died of strangles. Billy failed to cure the pony, and now Jody worries something will happen to Nellie. This doubt also assails Billy, who is insistent on not failing the boy again, both for Jody and his own pride.

Jody wakes up in the middle of the night. He dreams of all the possible things that could go wrong with Nellie's pregnancy, hoping none of them would come true. Then, "he [slips] his clothes on" and sneaks out to the barn to check on Nellie. When Jody catches sight of Nellie, "She [does] not stop her swaying nor look around." Before Jody can try to return to sleep again, Billy Buck frantically tells everyone that Nellie is ready to give birth. Billy Buck kneels down to her and realizes that "It's wrong" and that he "can't turn [the colt]". Billy Buck orders Jody to "turn [his] face". Billy Buck then hits Nellie over the head and performs a cesarean section on Nellie to deliver the promised colt to Jody. Billy then asks for Jody's help in caring for the new animal, and Jody goes to the house, but the image of Nellie and the bloody foal still linger in his mind.

"The Promise" was first published in the October 1937 issue of Harper's Monthly.

=== Chapter 4 – The Leader of the People ===
Jody's grandfather comes to visit. Carl Tiflin complains about how his father-in-law is constantly re-telling the same stories about leading a wagon train across the plains. Mrs. Tiflin and Billy, however, believe he's earned the right to tell of his adventures, and Jody is delighted to hear them no matter how many times. The morning after his arrival, Carl Tiflin complains about Grandfather's stories at the breakfast table: "Why can't he forget it, now it's done?...He came across the plains. All right! Now it's finished. Nobody wants to hear about it over and over." At that moment Grandfather walks into the room. Afterwards Jody's grandfather becomes melancholic. He acknowledges that his stories may be tiresome, but explains:

"I tell those stories, but they're not what I want to tell. I only know how I want people to feel when I tell them. It wasn't Indians that were important, nor adventures, nor even getting out here. It was a whole bunch of people made into one big crawling beast. And I was the head. It was westering and westering. Every man wanted something for himself, but the big beast that was all of them wanted only westering. I was the leader, but if I hadn't been there, someone else would have been the head. The thing had to have a head. Under the little bushes the shadows were black at white noonday. When we saw the mountains at last, we cried – all of us. But it wasn't getting here that mattered, it was movement and westering. We carried life out here and set it down the way those ants carry eggs. And I was the leader. The westering was as big as God, and the slow steps that made the movement piled up and piled up until the continent was crossed. Then we came down to the sea, and it was done." He stopped and wiped his eyes until the rims were red. "That's what I should be telling instead of stories."

Jody, attempting to console his weary, nostalgic, and heartbroken grandfather, tells him that he wants to be a leader as well. The story ends with Jody preparing a lemonade for his grandfather, allowed to do so by his mother after she realizes he is acting out of genuine sympathy, not in an effort to win himself a treat.

"The Leader of the People" was first published in the August 1936 issue of Argosy.

=== Junius Maltby ===
The short story concerns a man named Junius Maltby, who, dissatisfied with his life as an accountant in San Francisco, finally breaks with that life on the advice of his doctor, who recommends drier weather for his respiratory illness. Junius, in fairer climate, takes boarding with a widow and her children in his convalescence. After some time, with the townsfolk beginning to talk about the single man living so long with the widow, Junius promptly marries his landlord and becomes the head of the well-kept, profitable ranch/farm. The widow releases her working man and tries to put Junius to work on the farmstead, but Junius, having become accustomed to a life of leisure, ignores his duties. Eventually the farm falls into disrepair, the family goes broke, and without enough food or clothes, the widow and her children succumb to disease.

Only Junius and his lone son by the widow survive. Junius, with his barefoot child and a hired servant as lazy as he, spends his time reading books and having fanciful discussions with his companions, never actually working. Because of this, his son is raised in rags, though well trained to independent thought and flights of the imagination. Despite his appearance and the intention of the other children to torment him, the child is well received at school and indeed becomes a leader of the children. So influenced by him are they, the other children begin to spurn their shoes and tear holes in their clothes.

Except for the teacher, who finds the man and his son to be romantically dignified, the rest of the community has nothing but scorn for Junius and sympathy for his child. The story ends with members of the school board attempting to give the child some shoes and new clothes as a present. Upon realizing the regard in which he is held by society, he loses the last of his innocence and becomes ashamed, realizing for the first time that he is poor. The last scene has the sympathetic teacher see Junius and his son, cleaned and well dressed though painfully so, on their way back to San Francisco where Junius will go back to dull work and ill-health in order to provide for his unwilling son.

== Adaptations ==
In the summer of 1947 Lewis Milestone produced and directed a motion picture named The Red Pony for Republic Pictures, in Technicolor, starring Myrna Loy, Robert Mitchum, and child actor Peter Miles. The music for the movie was composed by Aaron Copland, who also arranged a suite for orchestra from the film score. Copland recorded this music for Columbia Records in London in 1975. The film was released in 1949.

Another film version was made for television in 1973, starring Henry Fonda and Maureen O'Hara. Jerry Goldsmith won his first Emmy for the score, which was released in a limited edition by Varèse Sarabande in 2012.

== Reception ==
Billboard complimented the novel by stating that "The Red Pony, [by] John Steinbeck, [is a] wrenching story of adolescent initiation into the world of death, birth, and disappointment."
