= James Carpenter (actor) =

American stage actor

James Carpenter is a San Francisco Bay Area stage actor, who performs with the California Shakespeare Theater in Orinda, California, and the American Conservatory Theater (ACT) in San Francisco. ACT's Carey Perloff described him as "...one of the finest American actors anywhere." Carpenter moved to the Bay Area in the mid-1980s and started appearing onstage regularly with Berkeley Rep. Over the next few decades, he performed with other Bay Area companies including California Shakespeare Theater, Shakespeare Santa Cruz, ACT, San Jose Repertory Theatre, Aurora Theatre, and the Black Box Theatre. In 2010, he was awarded a Lunt-Fontanne Fellowship. The fellowships are awarded to the best American regional theatre actors, who are then invited to attend a master class. In 2010, the emphasis of the fellowship was Shakespeare and the master teacher was Barry Edelstein.

In 2001, he co-starred with Holly Hunter in By the Bog of Cats, a production by the San Jose Repertory Theatre. As of 2012, he had played the role of Ebenezer Scrooge in ACT's annual production A Christmas Carol for seven years in a row.
