= John Hinkel Park =

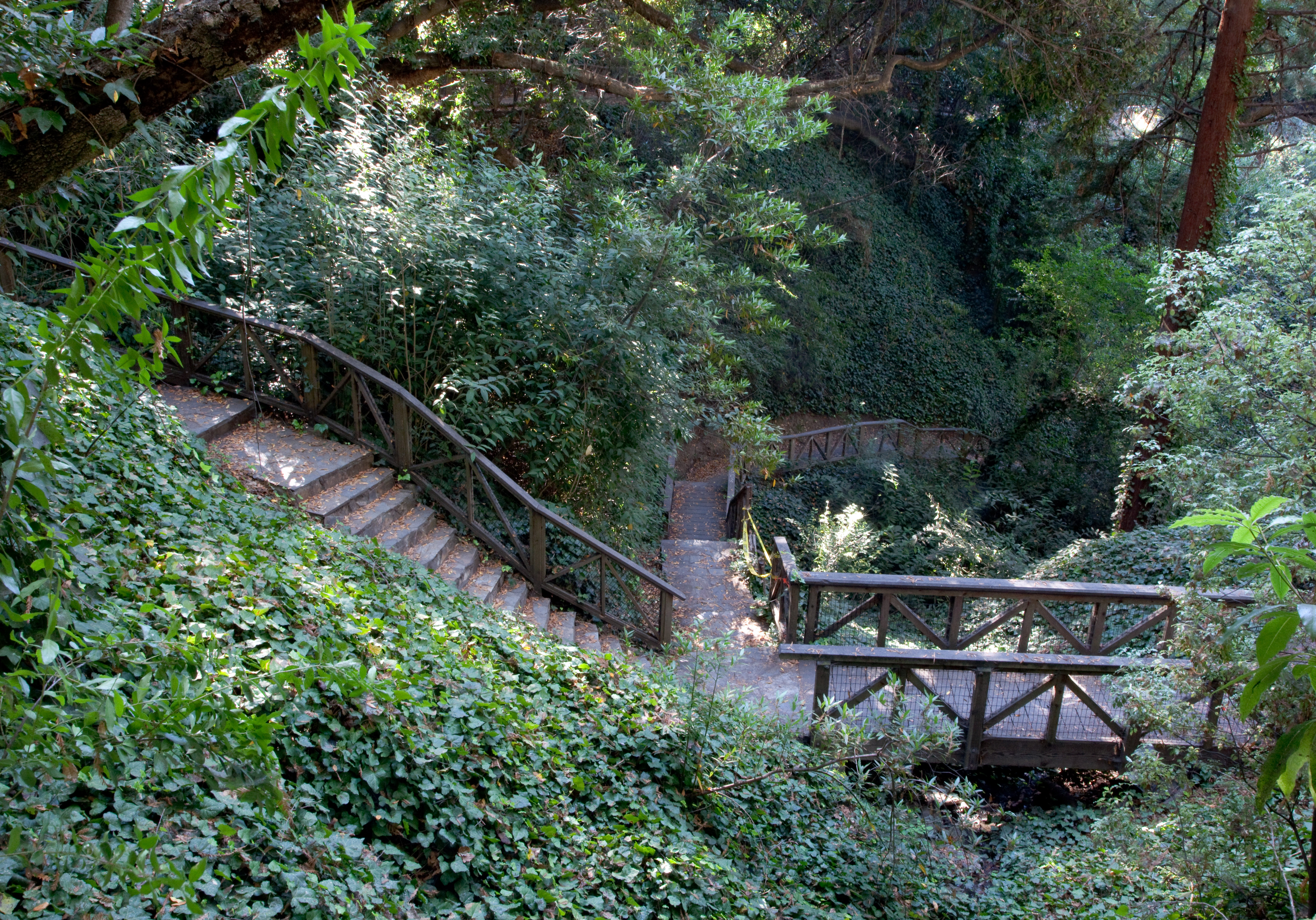
- Interactive map of John Hinkel Park
- Type: City park
- Location: 41 Somerset Place, Berkeley, California, U.S.
- Coordinates: 37.895278°N 122.273333°W
- Area: 4.9 acres (2.0 ha)
- Operator: City of Berkeley
John Hinkel Park
- Interactive map of John Hinkel Park
Berkeley Landmark
- Designated: April 2, 2001
- Reference no.: 238

John Hinkel Park is an urban park located in the North Berkeley neighborhood of Berkeley, California, U.S. It has been listed by the city as a Berkeley Landmark since April 2, 2001, and it contains a historical plaque since 2003.

== History ==
In 1919, Ada and John Hinkel donated 7 acres (2.8 ha) of hillside land to the city of Berkeley, in dedication to the Boy Scouts of America's work during World War I. John Gregg, a local professor in landscaping, had helped with the design of the park before it was donated to the city. The amphitheater was built in 1934 and designed by Vernon Dean and funded by the Civil Works Administration. The amphitheater was used in the 1940s for community gatherings, music, and dance productions. It was also the performance space for the Berkeley Shakespeare Festival from 1971 until 1991. In recent years the amphitheater has been used by a number of theatrical groups, including Shotgun Players, Women's Will, Open Opera, Inferno Theatre, and Actors Ensemble of Berkeley. The City of Berkeley also sponsors occasional live musical performances. The park also contains hiking trails, picnic tables and a playground.

It once contained a redwood clubhouse (1918–2015), which was the home of the Berkeley Folk Dancers until 1984, was declared unsafe due to foundation issues and ultimately burned down in a fire. The park was renovated in 2022.

== See also ==
- List of Berkeley Landmarks in Berkeley, California
- Berkeley Rose Garden
