= Rancho Corral de Tierra (Figueroa) =

Mexican land grant in California

Coordinates: 36.540°N 121.740°W

Rancho Corral de Tierra was a 4,435-acre (17.95 km^{2}) Mexican land grant in present day Monterey County, California given in 1836 by Governor Nicolás Gutiérrez to Francisco Figueroa for his daughter, Guadalupe Figueroa. The name means "earthen corral" in Spanish. The grant was south of in the upper Carmel Valley along Calera Canyon, between Rancho El Toro, and adjoined the northern boundary of Rancho Los Laureles.

== History ==
Francisco Figueroa (1804–) came to California in 1833 with his brother José Figueroa. He was in Monterey and married Maria de Jesus Palomares (1818–) in 1834. When José Figueroa died in 1835, Francisco Figueroa was administrator of his brother's estate, including operations at Rancho Los Alamitos. He was granted the one square league Corral de Tierra in 1836. In the mid-1840s, he was in Los Angeles.

With the cession of California to the United States following the Mexican-American War, the 1848 Treaty of Guadalupe Hidalgo provided that the land grants would be honored. As required by the Land Act of 1851, a claim for Rancho Corral de Tierra was filed with the Public Land Commission in 1852, and the grant was patented to Henry D. McCobb in 1876.

Corral de Tierra, California is now located here.
