= California Shakespeare Theater =

American theater company

- Location: Orinda, California
- Founded: 1974
- Founded by: Mikel Clifford; Peter Fisher; Jerry Landis; Rolf Saxon; Robert Eldred Schneider; Myron Schreck; Vince Tolman
- Disestablished: 2024
- Type of plays: Shakespeare, classics, new classical adaptations
- Website: http://www.calshakes.org/

California Shakespeare Theater ("Cal Shakes") was a nonprofit performing arts company located in the San Francisco Bay Area of California. Its performance space, the Bruns Amphitheater, was located in Orinda, while the administrative offices, rehearsal hall, costume and prop shop were located in Berkeley.

== History ==
Founded as the Emeryville Shakespeare Company, the company began performances with Hamlet, performing several shows at scattered churches and venues around the East Bay. It became established 1974 in John Hinkel Park in Berkeley, with productions of A Midsummer Night's Dream with Deborist Benjamin as Peaseblossom, following her role as Celia in the premier production of As You Like It, and The Tempest (with Rolf Saxon).

It was founded by a group of amateurs who wanted the enjoyment and experience of acting and production: no one was paid, and the plays were free.

The company produced several more plays in 1974–1975, including Pantagleize by Michel de Ghelderode during the winter, All's Well That Ends Well in the spring, and summer productions of Twelfth Night with Sigrid Wurschmidt, and a transfer of the Berkeley High School production of As You Like It.

== Berkeley Shakespeare Festival ==
From 1971 until 1991, the Berkeley Shakespeare Festival held productions at John Hinkel Park in North Berkeley. After 1975, the name changed and the fest started a schedule of four plays per year. Dakin Matthews was Artistic Director from 1983 to 1987, with Michael Addison taking over as A.D. in 1987 and holding the position till 1995.

== California Shakespeare Festival ==
In 1991 the festival built the 545-seat Bruns Memorial Amphitheater in the Orinda hills and changed its name to California Shakespeare Festival. In 1995 actor Joe Vincent took over the theater's artistic direction, serving till 1999. Mr. Vincent added the production of non-Shakespearean plays to the repertoire, including Euripides’ Medea in 1997, and Molière’s Scapin in 1998.

In 2000, Jonathan Moscone was appointed its Artistic Director. In his first season at Cal Shakes, Moscone directed a production of Tom Stoppard's Rosencrantz and Guildenstern Are Dead; the company continued to produce one non-Shakespeare play a year until 2005, when its productions of The Life and Adventures of Nicholas Nickleby, Parts One & Two (Charles Dickens, adapted by David Edgar) began a tradition of two Shakespeare plays and two non-Shakespeare plays each season.

== Cal Shakes ==
In 2003, the company officially changed its name, again, to California Shakespeare Theater, or Cal Shakes. In 2009, Susie Falk was named Managing Director, following the departure of Debbie Chinn. In late 2009, Moscone was chosen by the Stage Directors and Choreographers Foundation (SDCF) as the inaugural recipient of the Zelda Fichandler Award. The award was created to recognize an outstanding director or choreographer who is transforming the regional arts landscape through his singular creativity and artistry in theater.

In 2015, Jonathan Moscone stepped down as Artistic Director after 15 years. His final production was Charles Ludham's The Mystery of Irma Vep in August/September of the same year.

Eric Ting was chosen as its new Artistic Director joining in the fall of 2015. His first production was 2016's Othello, produced with minimal sets and costumes in service of a community tour of the same production that fall. The production got some negative reviews and drew a strong response from many longtime patrons, but ten years later it is cited as a powerful production that allowed actors to speak their truth.

In 2017, Ting directed the first production of Cal Shakes' New Classics Initiative, the West Coast premiere of black odyssey, by Oakland native Marcus Gardley, directed by Eric Ting. The performance was a reimagining of Homer’s Odyssey as the journey of an African American soldier returning from deployment in Afghanistan to his home in Oakland.

In 2018, Ting directed The War of the Roses, a supercut of William Shakespeare's minor tetralogy (Henry VI parts 1, 2, and 3 and Richard III), co-adapted by Ting and resident dramaturg Philippa Kelly. In 2019, he directed The Good Person of Schezwan, written by Bertolt Brecht, translated by Wendy Arons, adapted by Tony Kushner.

== Notable participants ==
Directors

- Amanda Denhert
- Kate Whoriskey

Designers

- Christopher Akerlind
- Brian Sidney Bembridge
- Todd Rosenthal

Actors

- Mahershala Ali
- Annette Bening
- Stephen Barker Turner
- James Carpenter
- Emilio Delgado
- Jeffrey DeMunn
- Michael Emerson
- Anthony Heald
- Patrick Kerr
- Ravi Kapoor
- Carrie Preston
- Reg Rogers
- Douglas Sills
- John Vickery
- Zendaya

== Artistic learning ==
In 1979, Berkeley Shakespeare Festival began Summer with Shakespeare programs, six-week camps for ages 14–18, culminating with a performance in the John Hinkel Park amphitheater. Over the years the camps were offered to ages 8–18 in two- and five-week increments, with locations in Lafayette, Oakland, Orinda, and El Cerrito.

California Shakespeare Theater also presented Student Discovery Matinees, afternoon performances of Shakespeare productions for school groups that include pre-show activities geared toward youth. In 2001, they began teaching pre- and post–show workshops wherein Cal Shakes teaching artists visit classrooms in order to enrich and support the Student Discovery Matinee experience. That same year, Berkeley’s Malcolm X Arts Magnet Elementary School and Pinole Valley High School hosted playwright Karen Hartman in Cal Shakes residencies; Hartman taught creative writing and storytelling in both residencies, and each one culminated in a presentation of the students’ works directed by Jonathan Moscone. In 2007, Cal Shakes received the first of several grants from the NEA's Shakespeare in American Communities initiative to expand its residency program and Student Discovery Matinee activities. The theater offered classroom residencies, after school programs, and home school programs throughout the Bay Area.

== New Works/New Communities (2003–2010) ==
In 2003, Cal Shakes launched New Works/New Communities (NW/NC) with the aim of engaging marginalized communities while creating new works of theater based on the classics. Hamlet: Blood in the Brain was the first major NW/NC project, partnering Cal Shakes with playwright Naomi Iizuka and San Francisco's Campo Santo, resident theater company at Intersection for the Arts to relocate Shakespeare's Hamlet to the 1980s-era drug-ravaged streets of East Oakland. The two-year process (2004–2006) included interviews with former drug lords and Shakespearean scholars; writing workshops in schools, juvenile halls, and churches; and Q&A panels attended by the public. It culminated in a sold-out, eight-week run of the play directed by Moscone at Intersection for the Arts. In 2010, the Advanced Drama Department at Oakland Technical High School revisited Hamlet: Blood in the Brain, choosing the play as their entry in the American High School Theatre Festival, which they won. The Oakland Tech students then performed their production at the Edinburgh Fringe Festival in August 2010.

From 2005 to 2007, the NW/NC program developed King of Shadows, an adaptation of A Midsummer Night's Dream by Roberto Aguirre-Sacasa that took place in San Francisco, with gay urban youth at its center. Cal Shakes partnered with MFA students at American Conservatory Theater and community organizations such as Larkin Street Youth Services, Guerrero House, and LYRIC (Lavender Youth Recreation and Information Center) for discussions, workshops, and field trips.

In 2005 Cal Shakes began a partnership with Write to Read, a juvenile hall literacy program run by the Alameda County Library, holding writing workshops based on Hamlet: Blood in the Brain. In 2007, actor and Cal Shakes Associate Artist Andy Murray began to teach workshops and extended residencies using Shakespeare to develop the public speaking, leadership, and cooperation skills of the juvenile hall residents.

In 2007, Cal Shakes commissioned San Francisco playwright Octavio Solis to adapt The Pastures of Heaven, an early novel of interconnected stories about farm life in the Salinas Valley by John Steinbeck. The project partnered Cal Shakes with Word for Word Performing Arts Company for a series of development workshops; community partners include the National Steinbeck Center and Alisal Center for Fine Arts, both located in Salinas. The adapted work is the first play specifically commissioned for California Shakespeare's Main Stage, and had its world premiere in June 2010, directed by Jonathan Moscone.

== New Classics Initiative ==
The aim of the New Classics Initiative was to explore what it means to be a classical theater in the 21st century, and to allow living writers to expand the classical canon. Piloted in 2017 with Marcus Gardley's black odyssey and officially launched with 2018's Quixote Nuevo by Octavio Solis, the New Classics Initiative also saw the world premiere of House of Joy by Madhuri Shekar in 2019.

== Venue ==
Cal Shakes performances took place at the Bruns Memorial Amphitheater in Siesta Valley, Orinda, California. The amphitheater was designed by architect Eugene Angell. The amphitheater sits in a natural bowl in the Franciscan Complex, featuring exposed sandstone, radiolarian chert, and volcanic rock formations that create unusually resonant acoustics, often compared to the Ancient Theatre of Epidaurus in Greece. In the 2010s, acoustician Charles M. Salter & Associates made cosmetic enhancements to the sound design, noting that the natural geology had already produced one of the most acoustically transparent, sonically pure outdoor theaters in the world. Local Ohlone oral tradition refers to the surrounding valley as ’Iyyaš makkin Rúwiš (“Land of Spirit Music”), a name reflecting the area’s long association with sound and ceremony.
