= To a God Unknown =

Novel by John Steinbeck

- First edition
- Author: John Steinbeck
- Language: English
- Genre: Fantasy novel
- Publisher: Robert O. Ballou
- Publication date: 1933
- Publication place: United States
- Media type: Print (hardback & paperback)
- Pages: Hardcover: 247, paperback: 240
- Preceded by: The Pastures of Heaven

To a God Unknown is a novel by John Steinbeck, first published in 1933. The book was Steinbeck's second novel (after Cup of Gold). Steinbeck found To a God Unknown extremely difficult to write; taking him roughly five years to complete, the novel proved more time-consuming than either East of Eden or The Grapes of Wrath, Steinbeck's longest novels.

== Plot ==
The protagonist of this story is Joseph Wayne, a rancher who was born and lived his early life on his father's ranch. He is the third of his brothers, younger than Burton and Thomas, who are both already married, but older than Benjy. As he grows up, he feels a special connection to the land, and decides to move to California to create a homestead and start a family. His father, John Wayne, begs him not to go but finally acquiesces once he realizes Joseph's passion, and gives him his blessing. On his way west, Joseph meets "Old Juan" who encourages him to establish a home and throw a fiesta once his home is set up. After a time of wandering, Joseph enters California and records his homestead in the Nuestra Senora valley. He builds his house under a great oak tree, which comes to symbolize his deceased father. While building, he works with an Indian, Juanito, who offers to be his vaquero in exchange for friendship. Joseph hears about the "dry years", a lengthy drought that seems to be periodic, and is the bane of all the farmers in the area. He is convinced, however, that they will never come again. He writes to his brothers and tells them to come and join him, to take the land next to his. As they explore the land they have been given, Joseph and Juanito stumble upon a mossy rock and a deep spring in the center of a pine forest. It has an aura about it that makes everyone acknowledge that it is sacred, but it is frightening as well.

Joseph later meets Elizabeth, a schoolteacher from Monterey. After several failed attempts, Joseph wins her hand and they are married. When they return to the farm after the wedding, they discover that Benjy has been stabbed to death by Juanito, who caught him seducing his wife. When the two men meet later that night at the sacred rock, Juanito asks Joseph to kill him in revenge for his brother, but Joseph refuses. Joseph wants to pass it off as an accident so Juanito can stay on, but Juanito flees the farm, promising to return once the guilt has passed. Elizabeth is integrated into the farm and meets Rama, Thomas' wife, who helps her with many things, including her first childbirth. For a time, the farm prospers, and Elizabeth bears a child. Joseph's brother Burton, a devout Christian, becomes increasingly concerned with Joseph's activities with the tree, after seeing him talk to it and apparently offer sacrifice to it as well. After a time, Joseph remembers his promise to Old Juan, and the farm becomes the site of a New Year's fiesta. After witnessing all the pagan activities that take place at the fiesta, Burton decides to leave the farm. After he leaves, the remaining brothers discover Burton had girdled the tree to kill it. In the following rainless winter, everything begins to die as a severe drought sets in, and everyone fears that the dry years have come again.

One day, Joseph and Elizabeth visit the glade with the sacred rock, to quell Elizabeth's fear of it. Elizabeth decides to climb on the mossy rock, but slips and falls, breaks her neck, and dies instantly. Joseph returns to the homestead in a state of shock with Elizabeth's body. Rama sees how disturbed Joseph is and sleeps with him to fulfill their needs. Later in the novel, Joseph gives his firstborn son to her. Some time later, when the drought is forcing desperate measures, Joseph and Thomas explore the coast to see if there is any way they will be able to remain at the homestead. They meet a man who ritually sacrifices small creatures to the sunset each evening, and Joseph feels a connection to him. Upon returning, Joseph and Thomas decide to drive the cattle out to San Joaquin to find green pastures. At the last minute, Joseph elects to stay, but feels abandoned by all the land except the pine grove with the stream and the mossy rock. He believes that the mossy rock is the heart of the land, and as long as it stays alive, the land cannot be truly dead. He then lives by the rock and watches the spring slowly dry up, using the water to keep the rock wet and alive. Juanito returns and convinces Joseph to visit the town's priest to enlist his help in breaking the drought. The priest initially refuses to pray for rain, saying that his concern is the salvation of human souls, but secretly prays for it once Joseph departs. Defeatedly, Joseph returns to the rock, only to find that the stream has run dry and the rock is dying. Lost in confusion, Joseph realizes that he is the heart of the land, and so sacrifices himself by cutting his wrists to water the rock with his blood. As he lies dying on the sacred rock, he feels rain begin to fall again.

== Characters ==
- Joseph Wayne - The protagonist of the story, Joseph is a rancher with a strong connection to the land. He is levelheaded, but is occasionally driven to feverish actions when inflamed with the passion of the land. He marries Elizabeth and introduces her to the rancher lifestyle, and together they have a child, named John Wayne after Joseph's father. At the end of the novel, Joseph realizes that he is the heart of the land and sacrifices himself to bring rain.
- Thomas Wayne - The second Wayne brother, Thomas has a special connection to animals. He can sense their moods and emotions, and loves to be around them. He does not understand or particularly like other men, and his only close companion is Joseph. He is the husband of Rama. He eventually takes responsibility for moving the animals to a new place after Burton leaves and Joseph decides to stay behind at the homestead.
- Burton Wayne - The oldest Wayne brother, Burton is unique in his dedication to his Christian religion. He is a sickly man, but believes that he was made so because God thought him strong enough to suffer. He sees many of the actions taken by the other brothers as pagan, and seems to be inspired by Father Angelo. He is responsible for girdling the tree at the center of the homestead. He leaves the homestead after being unable to deal with the irreligious actions of those surrounding him. He is the husband of Harriet.
- Benjy Wayne - The youngest Wayne brother. He is a charge upon his brothers, being irresponsible and irreverent, but appearing to be helpless and innocent. He often drinks himself into a stupor and sings drunken songs, to the shame of the others. Although married to Jennie, he often ends up sleeping with other women, which eventually leads to his death. He is killed by Juanito when he is caught in the act of seducing Alice, which inspires Juanito's self-imposed exile.
- Juanito - A Mexican, Juanito is part of the lumber carriers who help Joseph build his house. Although he claims to be Castilian, he later confesses that he is not. He is a close friend of Willie and is one of the few who can calm him when he has night terrors. Juanito becomes Joseph's vaquero, asking only friendship in return. He also knows more about the sacred rock and spring than anyone else, and tells Joseph about it when they stumble onto it. He marries Alice during the novel, and stabs Benjy to death.
- Willie - The son of Ramos, the lumber carrier, Willie is mentioned mostly in relation to his nightmares. He often dreams of finding himself in a deserted, blank landscape with holes, out of which come creatures who pull off his arms and legs. When Willie and Juanito look through a telescope at the Moon, Willie hangs himself, because in the Moon he sees the place of his nightmares. His death seems to foreshadow the macabre effect of solitude in nature found in the book.
- Elizabeth McGregor - Joseph's wife. She was raised under a strict father, and went to school to become a teacher. While working as a teacher at Monterey, she meets Joseph and eventually agrees to come home with him as his wife. She is a clever, book-smart woman, but does not have much worldly experience and relies heavily on Rama to explain things she does not understand.
- Rama - Rama is married to Thomas. She is a strong, worldly woman with much experience, and an expert at anything relating to maternity. As a result, she is contemptuous of nearly everything that men think or do. She is strict, but consistent, and a favorite among children. She understands people better than the other characters, and picks up on the smallest clues. She has three daughters with Thomas, and later inherits Joseph's firstborn.
- John Wayne (father of all the brothers) - John Wayne is a character only briefly in the novel, but he remains a powerful presence throughout it. He gives Joseph permission to go west and his blessing, but dies soon afterward. Joseph sees his spirit as being within the tree at the center of the homestead, and is therefore crushed when Burton kills it, for it was as if he had lost his father again. John is described as gentle, with a simplistic view of justice and is very down-to-earth.
- John Wayne (son of Joseph Wayne) - John Wayne is the son of Joseph and Elizabeth. His namesake is Joseph's father. He was barely an infant when his mother died, and is still very young at the end of the novel. He is given by Joseph to Rama, and it appears that he never had a deep attachment to John.
- Father Angelo - The priest assigned to the Indian village nearby. He is stringently Christian, and is fighting against the pagan traditions all around him. When Joseph visits him at the end of the novel, he seems to be collected and omniscient. He knows about the tree and Joseph's connection to it, and asks him to come to the Church instead of worshiping something pagan. However, when Father Angelo refuses to pray for rain, insisting instead that his business is with saving souls, Joseph cannot stand his passive attitude and leaves.

== Major themes ==
The novel examines what is meant by belief and how it affects different people. It also portrays the connection between the farmer and the land, a common theme, which appeared also in his later novels, such as East of Eden.
