= The Chrysanthemums =

1937 short story by John Steinbeck

The Chrysanthemums and Other Stories (1995) book cover

"The Chrysanthemums" is a short story by American writer John Steinbeck. It was first published in 1937 before being included as part of his collection The Long Valley the following year.

== Plot summary ==
The story opens with a panoramic view of the Salinas Valley in winter. The focus narrows and finally settles on Elisa Allen, cutting down the spent stalks of chrysanthemums, in the garden on her husband's ranch. Elisa is thirty-five, lean and strong, and she approaches her gardening with great energy. Her husband, Henry, comes from across the yard, where he had been arranging the sale of the thirty steers. Then he offers to take Elisa to town so they can celebrate the sale. He praises her skill with flowers, and she congratulates him on doing well in the negotiations for the steer. They seem to be a well-matched couple, though their way of talking together is formal and serious. While talking about their plan to go out, Henry jokingly asks Elisa if she would like to see a fight. Showing no interest, Elisa refuses and says she wouldn't like it. They agree on dinner and a movie instead. Elisa decides to finish her transplanting before they get ready to leave for town.

Elisa hears "a squeak of wheels and a plod of hoofs," and a man drives up in an old spring wagon (He is never named; the narrator simply calls him “the man”). Earning a meagre living, he fixes pots and sharpens scissors and knives. He travels from San Diego to Seattle and back every year. The man chats and jokes with Elisa, but she admits that she has no work for him to do. When he presses for a small job, she becomes annoyed and tries to send him away.

Suddenly, the man's attention turns to the flowers that Elisa is tending. When he asks about them, Elisa's annoyance vanishes and she becomes friendly again. The man remembers seeing chrysanthemums before and describes them: “Kind of a long-stemmed flower? Looks like a quick puff of colored smoke?”. Elisa is delighted with his description. The man tells her about one of his regular customers who also gardens. He claims this customer has asked him to bring her some chrysanthemum seeds if he ever finds some in his travels, and Elisa is happy to oblige. She invites the man into the yard and prepares a pot of chrysanthemum shoots for the putative woman's garden. She gives him full instructions for tending them. Elisa envies the man's life on the road and is attracted to him because he understands her love of flowers. In a moment of extreme emotion, she nearly reaches for him but snatches her hand back before she touches him. Instead, she finds him two pots to mend, and he drives away with fifty cents and the chrysanthemum shoots, promising to take care of them until he can deliver the chrysanthemums to the other woman.

Elisa goes into the house to get dressed for dinner. She scrubs herself vigorously and examines her naked body in the mirror before putting on her dress and makeup. When Henry sees her, he compliments her, telling her she looks "nice," “different, strong and happy”. When Henry and Elisa drive into town, she sees "a dark speck" ahead on the road. It turns out the man tossed her chrysanthemum shoots out of his wagon, but kept the pot Elisa had put them in. She feels hurt. Henry does not notice and Elisa does not mention it to him. It's then that Elisa brings up an interest in the fights that night. She asks if "women ever go to the fights". Henry answers "Oh sure, some", but reminds her that she probably wouldn't like it. She agrees and says the night out alone will be plenty. She turns her head so he cannot see her crying. She also says she feels like an old woman.

== Characters ==
Elisa Allen - A thirty-five-year-old woman who lives on a ranch just across the Salinas River with her husband, Henry. Elisa is described as having a "lean and strong" face and eyes as "clear as water" and when wearing her gardening costume, she looks like she has a blocked and heavy figure. Elisa usually spends her time in the garden, tending to her chrysanthemums.

Henry Allen - Elisa's husband who lives on the ranch with her. He loves Elisa's passion for the garden but cannot seem to understand why she never uses her gift for anything else besides the chrysanthemums.

The Man - A travelling mender who arrives on the road in a wagon that has a canvas painted with the words "Pots, pans, knives, sisors, lawn mores, Fixed." on it. The man is not given a formal name throughout the story.

== Symbolism ==
The Language of Flowers often translate to symbolism commonly within literature. In "The Chrysanthemums," the chrysanthemum flowers are frequently used as a symbol throughout the story.

The chrysanthemums are mentioned throughout the story and can be seen a symbol of Elisa. Chrysanthemum stems are long, strong, and tough which are symbolic of Elisa's masculine qualities. However, the flower itself is delicate and tender which represents the parts of Elisa that are feminine. The contradictory characteristics of chrysanthemums being both strong yet beautiful epitomize how Elisa is atypical of a woman for being both masculine and feminine. This is proven true when Elisa sees the flowers in the middle of the road and that the pot is gone; she is hurt by the discovery almost as if she is the flower herself. Elisa viewed it as letting herself be free and just getting hurt as a result. Many critics also argue that the chrysanthemums are a symbol of women's frustration.

Another thing that the chrysanthemums symbolize is "Elisa's children". It is seen periodically throughout the story by how Elisa cares for and protects her chrysanthemums.

Overall, the chrysanthemums symbolize Elisa's role as a woman in society. In the beginning, they symbolize her children, but as we continue reading, they start to symbolize her femininity and sexuality. Elisa gets annoyed with her life because a child and romantic encounters are nonexistent in her marriage. Her husband, Henry, also does not cater to her emotional needs and the qualities of her womanhood. She eventually thinks that things will change, but once she sees the chrysanthemums in the road, she realizes that her hopes have died as well.

There is also the symbolism about confinement. The story opens by describing the setting of the fog over the Salinas Valley "like a lid on the mountains and [make] of the valley a closed pot." This foreshadows Elisa's situation of being unable to truly please her husband with her gift of raising Chrysanthemums in addition to being unaware of people who may try to deceive her for personal gain.

== Film version ==
A twenty-three-minute filmed version was made in 1990 by Steve Rosen for Pyramid Films of Santa Monica.
