= Flight (Steinbeck story) =

"Flight" is a short story by American writer John Steinbeck, first published in his 1938 collection The Long Valley. It appears in the ledger notebook under the title "Man Hunt". The story outlines a young man, Pepé, who is sent into town by his mother. She says he is not yet a man. While he is gone, Pepé kills a man, and after his return, he is forced to flee.

== Plot ==
The story opens on the Mexican-Indian Torres family, who live on a poor farm beside the ocean 15 miles below Monterey, California. The family consists of Mama Torres and her three children: her eldest son Pepé – age 19, Rosy – aged 14, and Emilio – age 12. The mother has been a widow for ten years ever since her husband accidentally tripped and was bitten by a rattlesnake. The two youngest children help their mother by fishing but Pepé is lazy; he amuses himself by throwing his father's folding knife into a post.

His mother sends Pepé into town to buy some medicine and salt; he can eat and sleep at her friend's, Mrs. Rodriguez's, house for the night. Pepé rides off on her errand. The next day he comes back and confesses that at Mrs. Rodriguez's, he had stabbed a man who had called him names; now he must flee. Putting his father's saddle on a fresh horse, he also takes his father's hat, coat and .38-56 rifle, along with a water bag and some beef jerky. As Pepé flees into the mountains, his mother cries out in anguish – for she knows he will neither come back nor survive.

As he is riding on a trail day and night, a traveler passes him going the opposite way. He loses his father's hat after he stops at a spring to water his horse and rest for the night. While riding along the trail, his horse is killed by a rifle shot; Pepé fires back at his unseen assailant one of the ten rifle cartridges he has. A returning shot drives a splinter of granite stone into his hand. Although he removes the projectile, his hand swells and hurts – the wound has badly infected his arm. Tired, exhausted and thirsty, he discards his father's coat.

While fleeing from tracking dogs and a posse on horses, he also loses the rifle. He makes it to the top of a ridge only to find desert and more ridges. Hearing the dogs, he rises up on a big rock on the ridge and is silhouetted against the morning sky looking down. A bullet strikes at his feet, and a second bullet hits him in the chest. He falls forward toward the little valley he came from in an avalanche. Pepé comes to rest at the bottom of the ridge and the stones cover his head.
