= Jonathan Moscone =

American theater director (born 1964)

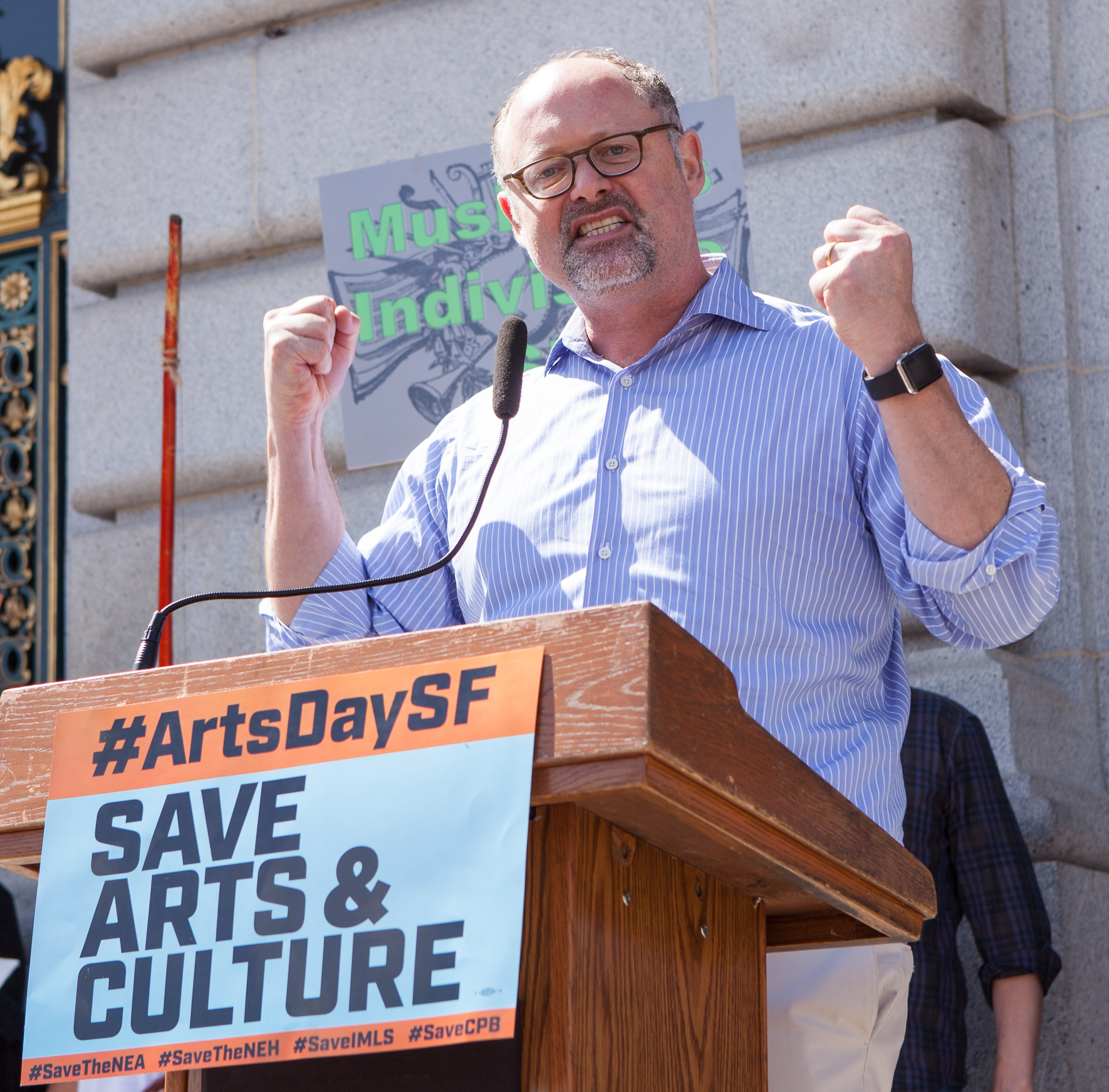
- Moscone in 2017
- Born: October 5, 1964 (age 62); San Francisco, California, U.S.
- Education: Williams College (BA); Yale University (MFA)
- Occupations: Theatre director, producer and arts leader
- Spouse: Darryl Carbonaro (m. 2013)
- Father: George Moscone

Jonathan Moscone (born October 5, 1964) is an American theater director, having most recently served as a Council member then executive director of the California Arts Council under Governor Gavin Newsom's administration. Formerly the Chief Producer of Yerba Buena Center for the Arts (YBCA), and artistic director of California Shakespeare Theater (Cal Shakes) in Berkeley and Orinda, California for 16 years, Moscone received the inaugural Zelda Fichandler Award, given by the Stage Directors and Choreographers Foundation for his transformative work in theater.

== Early life ==
Moscone was born in San Francisco, the youngest child of George Moscone and Gina Bondanza; his father was a member of the San Francisco Board of Supervisors at the time of his birth, and later became a state senator and Mayor of San Francisco. His siblings are Jenifer (born in 1957), Rebecca (born in 1960), and Christopher (born in 1962). When he was 14 years old, in 1978 his father was murdered by former Supervisor Dan White. Jonathan's mother fell into a deep, multi-year depression and Jonathan did not speak about his father's death publicly for 20 years.

Moscone attended grammar school at École Notre-Dame-des-Victoires and high school at Saint Ignatius College Preparatory in San Francisco's Sunset district, graduating in 1982. He attended Williams College in Williamstown, Massachusetts, where he majored in Theater and English, graduating in 1986. Moscone credits his father, who took him to the Civic Light Opera, for sparking his love of theater. As a youth, he also often went to matinees at the American Conservatory Theater.

After college, Moscone worked for producer Carole Shorenstein Hays, and then moved to New York where he worked as an assistant to Joseph Papp, producer of the New York Shakespeare Festival, from 1986 to 1989. In 1989, Moscone became a directing intern at Berkeley Repertory Theatre in Berkeley, California. That year he was accepted into the Yale School of Drama, where he received his Masters of Fine Arts in Directing in 1993.

== Career ==
Upon graduation from Yale, Moscone moved to Dallas where he worked at the Dallas Theater Center, serving as DTC's associate director from 1993 to 1999. While at DTC, Moscone began his freelance directing career. In 1995, he directed his first professional production at the Magic Theatre in San Francisco. Moscone cites as influences Joseph Papp, JoAnne Akalaitis (particularly her 1989 production of Cymbeline), Irene Lewis, Arden Fingerhut, and Tony Taccone, former artistic director of Berkeley Repertory Theater.

I believe we have to let other voices into what we think of as the classics. Everyone has the right to touch and feel and own the classics. They belong to all of us.

In 2000, Moscone became the artistic director of the California Shakespeare Theater (Cal Shakes). In addition to providing artistic leadership at Cal Shakes, Moscone continued to work as a freelance director throughout the United States, and was an adjunct faculty member at American Conservatory Theater's Masters of Fine Arts Program. He served for 6 years on the board of directors of the Theatre Communications Group, the national service organization for the American theater. Currently, he sits on the boards of the Chinese Culture Center as co-chair and is chair of the board of a new theater company in New York City, The Tent, which advocates for and supports elder American playwrights.

In 2009, Moscone received the inaugural Zelda Fichandler Award, given by the Stage Directors and Choreographers Foundation for "transforming the American theatre through his unique and creative work".

Moscone directed a wide range of plays at CalShakes and other theaters around the country. Among the more notable of his efforts was his co-direction (with Sean Daniels) in 2005 of The Life and Adventures of Nicholas Nickleby. The play, which was performed in two parts, ran for more than six hours and had an enormous cast of 24 players. The San Francisco Chronicle said it was CalShakes' "most ambitious and successful productions ever". In 2010, Moscone directed the world premiere of Octavio Solis' John Steinbeck's 'The Pastures of Heaven', which was also the recipient of the inaugural NEA New Play Development Award. Moscone directed Bruce Norris' Clybourne Park in 2011 for the American Conservatory Theater, a play which later won the Pulitzer Prize. That same year, he directed Candida, for which he won the San Francisco Bay Area Theatre Critics Circle award as the Best Director of the year.

Moscone made his debut as a playwright in 2012 with the world premiere of Ghost Light, which he co-created and developed with playwright Tony Taccone for the Oregon Shakespeare Festival and the Berkeley Repertory Theatre. The play, which draws heavily on Moscone's experiences in the wake of his father's murder, concerns a man directing a production of William Shakespeare's Hamlet, who is tormented by dreams involving a sadistic prison guard and whose love life is falling apart. In both flashback and contemporaneous action, a 14-year-old version of the director tries to sicken himself so that his father won't be murdered. The play is set against the electoral fight against California's Proposition 8, the making of Gus Van Sant's film Milk, and repeated intercessions for help by the ghost of Hamlet's father.

In 2016, Moscone was a co-proponent for a ballot measure in the City of San Francisco aimed at restoring the connection between the SF Hotel Tax Fund and support for the arts. The measure (Prop S) failed to win the necessary 2/3rds vote, earning nearly 64% of the vote. 2 years later, the arts and culture communities went back to the ballot, this time in collaboration with City Hall, and that proposition (Prop E) won an overwhelming 75% of the vote.

In March 2022, Moscone was appointed director of the California Arts Council, a position he held for nearly 2 years. Currently, he is directing theater and producing events as a member of Ideas Collaborative. He also serves on the board of the Roxie Cinema in San Francisco and is President of the Board of The Tent Theater in New York City.

== Personal life ==
Moscone came out as gay at a 1998 memorial service for his father and Harvey Milk. He married clean energy executive Darryl Carbonaro in November 2013. They currently reside in San Francisco.

== Awards ==
- Zelda Fichandler Award (2009)
- Best Director, San Francisco Bay Area Theatre Critics Circle Award (2001,2011)
- Best Director, Leon Rabin Award, Dallas, TX (2007).
