= Chrysanthemum (cocktail) =

Anise-flavored cocktail

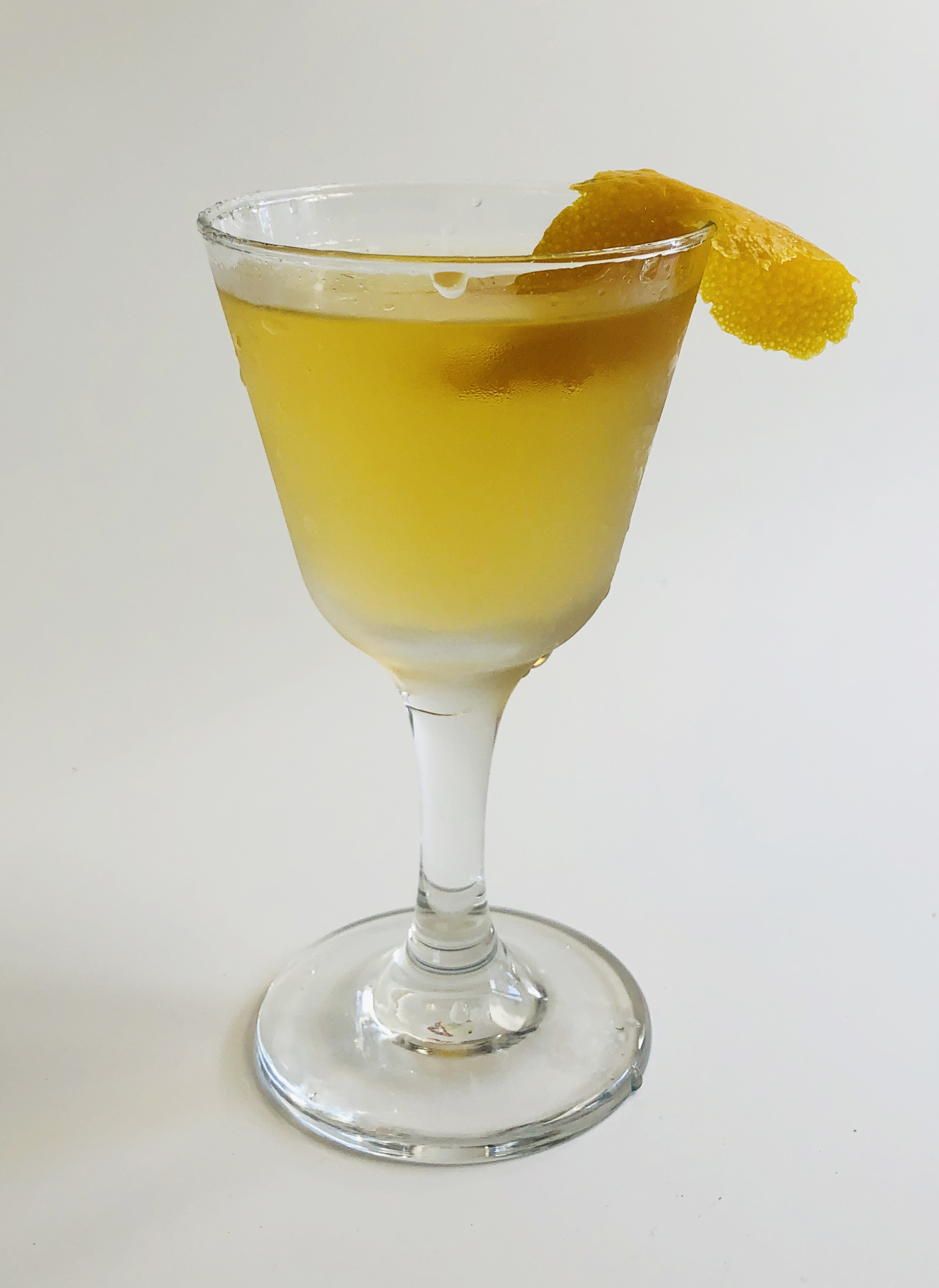
- Type: Cocktail
- Ingredients: 1.5 oz dry vermouth; 3/4 oz bénédictine; 2-3 dashes absinthe
- Standard drinkware: Champagne coupe
- Standard garnish: Orange peel
- Preparation: Stir all ingredients with ice and strain into a chilled coupe

The Chrysanthemum is a cocktail made with absinthe, Bénédictine, and vermouth. This pre-Prohibition Era cocktail is sometimes credited to the 1930 edition of The Savoy Cocktail Book, although an earlier recipe appears in the influential early 20th-century cocktail book Recipes for Mixed Drinks (1916) by Hugo R. Ensslin.

Ensslin's original recipe called for equal parts of dry vermouth and Bénédictine, while most modern adaptations follow Harry Craddock's recipe, which uses a 2:1 ratio of vermouth to Bénédictine to prevent the sweetness of the latter from overwhelming the drink. Some recipes add lemon juice.

In Jack's Manual on the Vintage and Production, Care and Handling of Wines, Liquors, etc., from 1933, the historic recipe is made with anisette, instead of absinthe.

== See also ==
- Arsenic and Old Lace
