= Corral de Tierra, California =

Unincorporated community in California, United States

Corral de Tierra
- Unincorporated community
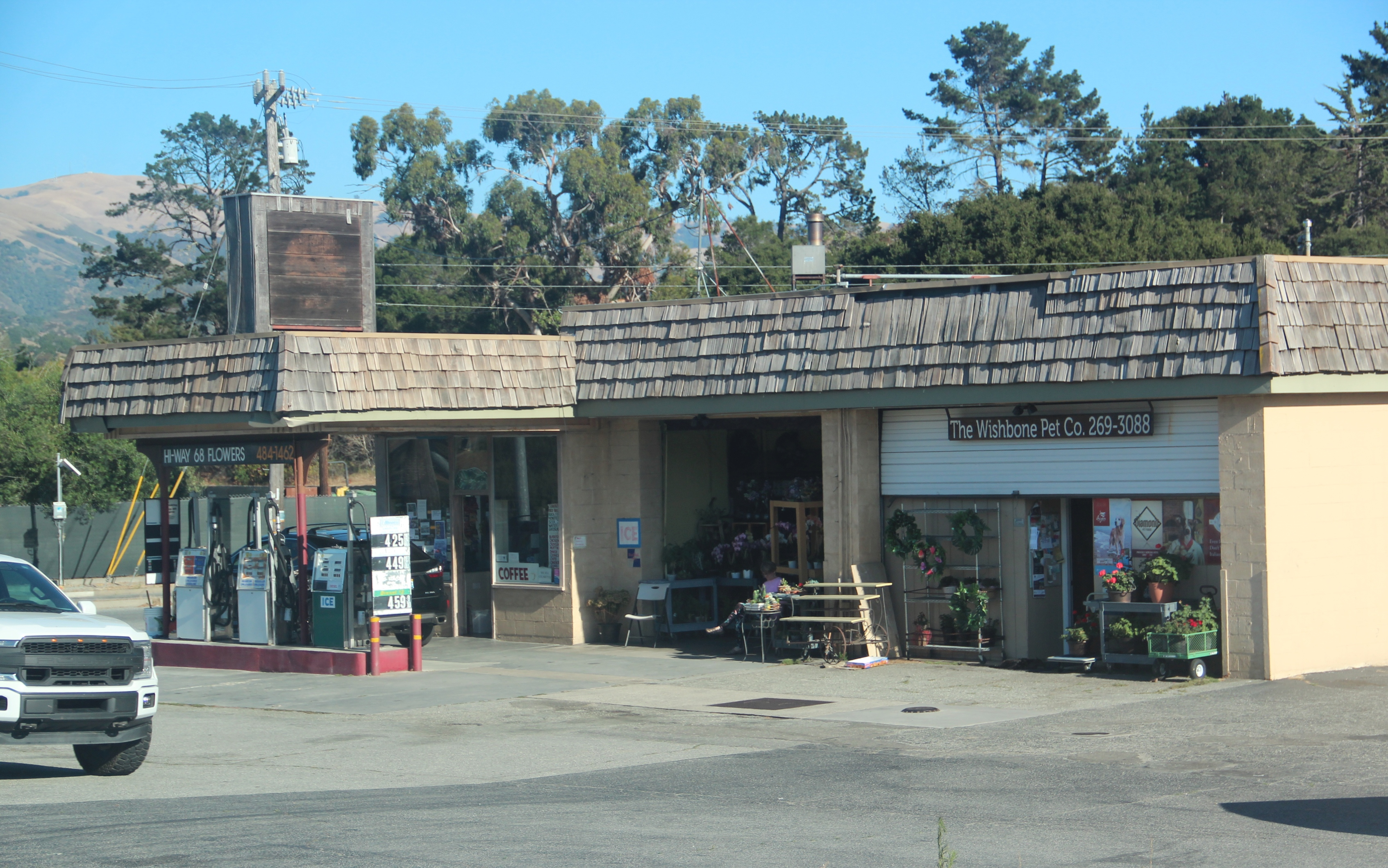
- Gas station in Corral de Tierra

- Location in California
- Coordinates: 36°34′12″N 121°43′57″W
- Country: United States
- State: California
- County: Monterey
- Elevation: 404 ft (123 m)
- GNIS feature ID: 1873397

Corral de Tierra (Spanish for "Pen of Earth") is an unincorporated community in Monterey County, California, United States. It is located in the Corral de Tierra Valley, on the former land grant of Rancho Corral de Tierra, at an elevation of 404 feet (123 m).

== Government ==
At the county level, Corral de Tierra is represented on the Monterey County Board of Supervisors by Supervisor Mary Adams.

In the California State Senate, Corral de Tierra is in the 17th senatorial district, represented by Democrat John Laird. In the California State Assembly, it is split between the 29th Assembly district, represented by Democrat Robert Rivas, and the 30th Assembly district, represented by Democrat Dawn Addis.

In the United States House of Representatives, Corral de Tierra is in California's 19th congressional district, represented by Democrat Jimmy Panetta

== Geography ==
The community of Corral de Tierra lies along Highway 68 midway between Salinas and the Monterey Peninsula. State Route (SR) 68 stretches 20 miles between Salinas and Pacific Grove. It is part of the DeAnza Trail, a route that once linked all of California’s mission settlements during the Spanish Colonial era. CalTrans had plans to turn SR 68 into a freeway in the 1950s and 1960s, but environmental concerns stopped the expansion. As of 2006, the route carried 26,000 vehicles a day. Many of these trips are generated by 13,500 residents who now live in the Toro Park, San Benancio and Corral de Tierra districts.

The corner of Corral de Tierra and Highway 68 is 10 miles from the City of Monterey, 7 miles from the City of Salinas, 9.8 miles from the City of Seaside, and 8 miles from the town of Del Rey Oaks. It is in close proximity to many coastal and inland cities.

== Popular culture ==
John Steinbeck’s The Pastures of Heaven, a short story cycle published in 1932, is set in the valley. In their youth, Steinbeck and his sister, Mary, played at the base of Castle Rock, the "fence of earth" giving Corral de Tierra its Spanish name.

The beautiful valley between Monterey and Salinas, granted by Governor Guiterrez to Francisco Figueroa in 1836, inspired Steinbeck’s short stories and California-based novels. In the last half century, small neighborhoods have been built in the valleys running off the Monterey-Salinas Highway, and a sense of independent identity and community has formed among the residents in the community of Corral de Tierra, California 93908.
