= Pascal Covici =

Romanian Jewish-American publisher and editor

Pascal Avram "Pat" Covici (November 4, 1885–October 14, 1964) was a Romanian Jewish-American book publisher and editor, best known for his close associations with authors such as John Steinbeck, Saul Bellow, and many more noted American literary figures, mainly through his position at Viking Press.

== Early life ==
Covici, known to his friends as "Kai," was born on November 4, 1885, in Botoșani, Kingdom of Romania. He was the son of vintner Wolf Covici and Schifra Barish. At the age of twelve, his family immigrated to Chicago where his six brothers owned and managed a number of retail stores. He studied at the University of Michigan and the University of Chicago but did not graduate from either school, working instead at his brothers' stores.

=== Early publishing career ===
For several years, he published a monthly newspaper in Bradenton, Florida. In 1922, together with partner Billy McGee, he started a publishing company (McGee/Covici, then, Covici-McGee) and bookstore in Chicago. The store became a popular spot for writers, and the company published special, limited edition books, often created for collectors. Ben Hecht's 1922 novel, Fantazius Mallare, published by the firm, was labeled obscene, restricted, and confiscated by post office officials. Hecht, the illustrator Wallace Smith, and the publishers were arrested. They pleaded no contest, and had to pay a fine of $1,000. In 1928 he published The Wild Party by Joseph Moncure March. The poem was considered lewd and was banned in a number of places, including Boston.

=== New firm and controversy ===
When McGee left the company due to health issues in 1924, Covici continued to publish under Pascal Covici, Inc. Several years later, he began a firm with Donald Friede in New York City. The play The Front Page by Hecht and Charles MacArthur and the novel The Well of Loneliness by Radclyffe Hall garnered the company quick success. The Well of Loneliness was seized from Covici-Friede's offices after Friede sold a copy to John Saxton Sumner of the New York Society for the Suppression of Vice but the New York Court of Special Sessions cleared the book of charges of obscenity.

In addition to writers like Gene Fowler, Wyndham Lewis, Clifford Odets, and Nathanael West, their key author was John Steinbeck, whom they signed in 1934. They published Tortilla Flat in 1935 and other new and reprinted Steinbeck works. Covici-Friede failed in 1938; in 1943, Crown Publishing purchased the firm's assets.

=== Viking Press ===
In 1938, Covici moved to Viking Press, where he convinced Steinbeck to sign. Viking published The Grapes of Wrath (1939), which received a 1940 Pulitzer Prize for Fiction. Overall, Covici's association with Steinbeck was long-lasting and highly honored by both sides.

Covici also worked on the Viking Portable Library and with authors like Joseph Campbell, Ludwig Bemelmans, Gilbert Highet, Lionel Trilling, Arthur Miller, George Gamow, Shirley Jackson, Willy Ley, Marianne Moore, and Saul Bellow. Bellow's novel Herzog, Steinbeck's East of Eden, and Jackson's We Have Always Lived in the Castle are dedicated to Covici.

=== Death and legacy ===
Covici died on October 14, 1964. His relationship with John Steinbeck is portrayed in the book Steinbeck and Covici: The Story of a Friendship, edited by Thomas Fensch.

== Other works published ==
- 1001 Afternoons in Chicago, Ben Hecht
- Broken Necks Containing More 1001 Afternoons, Ben Hecht
- Fantazius Mallare, a Mysterious Oath, Ben Hecht
- Kingdom of Evil, Ben Hecht
- The Coming Struggle for Power, John Strachey
- The Sweet Singer of Michigan, Julia Moore
- The Childermass, Wyndham Lewis
- Complete Cheerful Cherub, Rebecca McCann
- Speakeasy Girl, Bobbie Meredith
- Bachelor's Wife, George A. Bagby
- Boy Crazy, Grace Perkins
