= Elaine Anderson Steinbeck =

American actress

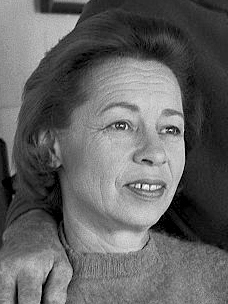
- Steinbeck in 1963
- Born: Mary Elaine Anderson; August 14, 1914; Austin, Texas, U.S.
- Died: April 27, 2003 (aged 88); Manhattan, New York City, U.S.
- Resting place: Garden of Memories Memorial Park Cemetery, Salinas, California
- Other name: Elaine Anderson Scott
- Occupations: Actress; stage manager
- Spouses: Zachary Scott (m. 1934; div. 1950) John Steinbeck (m. 1950; died 1968)
- Relatives: Thomas Steinbeck (stepson); John Steinbeck IV (stepson)

Elaine Anderson Steinbeck (born Mary Elaine Anderson; August 14, 1914 – April 27, 2003) was an American actress and stage manager. She was married to author John Steinbeck.

== Biography ==
Anderson was born on August 14, 1914, in Austin, Texas.

On February 21, 1934, Anderson married actor Zachary Scott, whom she met while they both studied in the University of Texas at Austin theatre program. Anderson studied drama at the University of Texas, Austin. She worked with Scott at the Austin Little Theatre for several years, and in the process they met several people with connections in the New York theatre. Around 1940, the Scotts moved to New York City to seek success there. Though both wished to be successful actors, Zachary had more success in that area, so Elaine began working for The Theatre Guild in New York and learned the technical aspects of theatre production.

In late 1944, Elaine gave up her career to relocate to Hollywood with Zachary, who had signed a seven-year contract with Warner Brothers.

The Scotts had a daughter, Waverly. They divorced in 1949.

Within a week of her divorce from Scott, Elaine married writer John Steinbeck on December 28, 1950. They had no children together and remained married until his death in December 1968.

Anderson died of natural causes on April 27, 2003, in Manhattan at the age of 88. She was buried near Steinbeck in the Garden of Memories Memorial Park in Salinas, California.

When Elaine Steinbeck died in 2003, she left her daughter as executor of the estate. In 2017, a federal jury in Los Angeles awarded Waverly Scott Kaffaga more than $13 million in a lawsuit claiming the author's son and daughter-in-law impeded film adaptations of his classic works. The lawsuit followed a decades-long dispute between Thomas Steinbeck and Elaine over control of the author's works.

== Works ==
=== Published works ===
Steinbeck, John (1975). Elaine Steinbeck; Robert Wallsten (eds.). Steinbeck: A Life in Letters. New York: Viking Press. ISBN 0-670-66961-X.
