= Warren French =

New Zealand darts player

Personal information
- Full name: Warren French
- Nickname: "Frog"
- Born: 26 March 1963 (age 63) Ashburton, New Zealand

Sport
- Sport: Darts
- Playing since: 1988
- Darts: 25g Shot
- Laterality: Right-handed
- Walk-on music: "Welcome to the Jungle" by Guns N' Roses

Organisation (see split in darts)
- PDC: 2006–2024

PDC premier events – best performances
- World Championship: Last 64: 2007, 2009, 2012

Other tournament wins
- Years
Canterbury Open	2009
PDC World New Zealand Qualifying Event	2008

Warren French (born 26 March 1963) is a New Zealand former professional darts player. He used the nickname Frog for his matches.

== Career ==
French reached the final of the 2006 New Zealand Open, losing to former world champion Tony David. He played in the 2007 PDC World Darts Championship, losing 3–1 in the first round to James Wade. French won the 2008 New Zealand National Championship which earned him a place in the 2009 PDC World Darts Championship. He won his preliminary match against Japan's national champion Akihiro Nagakawa and was then trounced 3–0 by Dennis Priestley in the first round.

The match with Nagakawa is widely considered to be the worst match ever in the history of either the PDC or BDO World Championships, where both players averaged 54. The standard was so poor, that Sky Sports stopped broadcasting it halfway through.

French qualified for the 2012 PDC World Darts Championship. He played the Republic of Ireland's Connie Finnan in the preliminary round, and won 4–3 with an average of 85.88, a vast improvement on his 2009 performance. French played Mark Walsh in the first round and, although he won the first set, would go on to lose the match 1–3. French represented New Zealand with Preston Ridd in the 2012 PDC World Cup of Darts and together they were beaten 3–5 by Austria in the first round.

== World Championship results ==
=== PDC ===
- 2007: First round (lost to James Wade 1–3) (sets)
- 2009: First round (lost to Dennis Priestley 0–3)
- 2012: First round (lost to Mark Walsh 1–3)
