= Robert DeMott =

American author, scholar, and editor

Robert DeMott (born November 22, 1943) is an American author, scholar, and editor best known for his influential scholarship on writer John Steinbeck, winner of the Pulitzer Prize for The Grapes of Wrath (1939), and the Nobel Prize for Literature in 1962.

== Life ==
Robert DeMott was born in New Canaan, Connecticut, in 1943, the only child of James and Colletta DeMott. Until the age of eight, he lived with his parents on the estate of well known political artist and fine-art illuminator Arthur Szyk, who published The New Order (1941) and Ink & Blood (1946) and illustrated numerous Biblical and literary texts, as well as the 1948 Declaration of the Establishment of the State of Israel. In 1951, DeMott's family moved to Norwalk, CT, where he attended and then graduated from Norwalk High School in 1961. He was educated at Assumption College, John Carroll University, and Kent State University, where he earned his B.A. (1965), M.A. (1967), and Ph.D. (1969), respectively. His doctoral dissertation, The Eccentric Orbit: Dimensions of the Creative Process in Thoreau's Major Writings, was directed by Howard P. Vincent.

DeMott was married twice: to Michelle Hurley in 1965 (divorced 1980), and to Andrea Berger in 1992 (divorced 2005). He has one child, Elizabeth, with his first wife. DeMott lives in Athens, OH, with his partner, writer and editor Kate Fox.

DeMott is currently Edwin and Ruth Kennedy Distinguished Professor Emeritus of English at Ohio University in Athens, Ohio, an endowed position he was awarded in 1998. After 38 1/2 years DeMott retired from full-time teaching in April, 2007, and continued to teach one academic quarter per year under Ohio University's Phased Retirement program until 2013, when he retired completely. His correspondence with writers John Haines, Jim Harrison, Dave Smith, and Laura Kalpakian, and film maker Pare Lorentz is at, respectively, the following libraries: Beinecke Library, Yale University; Special Collections and University Archives, Grand Valley State University, Allendale, MI; The Robert E. and Jean R. Mahn Center for Archives and Special Collections, Alden Library, Ohio University, Athens, OH; Special Collections, Charles Young Research Library, UCLA;and Franklin D. Roosevelt Library, Hyde Park, NY. His collection of signed and inscribed first edition books and fine press chapbooks by poets William Heyen and Michael Waters is also housed at Ohio University's Mahn Center.

A lifelong fly fisherman, DeMott is an International Federation of Fly Fishers Certified Casting Instructor, a graduate of Western Rivers Professional Guide School, a member of both the American Museum of Fly Fishing and the Catskill Fly Fishing Center and Museum, Theodore Gordon Flyfishers, The Anglers' Club of New York, and a life member of Trout Unlimited. He has written on fly fishing in Trout, Yale Angler's Journal, Gray's Sporting Journal, and American Angler, and Bulletin of Anglers' Club of New York, where he is a member of the editorial board.

== Career ==
DeMott began his academic career as assistant professor of American literature at Ohio University in 1969. From 1973 to 1979, he and colleague Dave Smith co-edited the Back Door, a poetry magazine that Smith had founded in 1969. DeMott also created an English course on living writers, team-taught with colleague Carol Harter, that featured such writers as Walter Tevis, Hollis Summers, Jack Matthews, Wayne Dodd, Daniel Keyes, James Norman Schmidt, and others. DeMott became a full professor at Ohio University in 1979. He designed and taught the first courses at Ohio University on women's fiction, environmental writing, fly fishing literature, and doctoral student pedagogy. He received five undergraduate teaching awards, including University Professor, Grasselli Faculty Teaching Award in the Humanities, and Honors Tutorial College's Outstanding Tutor Award, as well as the Outstanding Graduate Professor Award. DeMott directed twenty-one Ph.D. dissertations on a wide range of American literary topics and four in creative writing (poetry), many of which were published as full-length books.

DeMott's primary scholarly attention focuses on novelist John Steinbeck. He has published numerous books and more than seventy articles and essays on Steinbeck. In 1984, after many years of archival research, he published the first book of a scholarly trilogy on Steinbeck: Steinbeck's Reading: A Catalogue of Books Owned and Borrowed, a look into the reading habits and reconstructed print library of the famous author. Widely referenced, Steinbeck's Reading is considered an essential resource in Steinbeck studies. In 1989, DeMott published his edition of Working Days: The Journals of The Grapes of Wrath, 1938–1941. This book was an extensively annotated volume of the journal kept by Steinbeck during the five months he was writing The Grapes of Wrath. Working Days was a New York Times Notable Book for 1989, one of the year's ten best books listed by the San Diego Union, and among the twenty recommended books for 1989 by Writers Digest magazine. It has been translated into Japanese and Chinese. Finally, DeMott's third book in the trilogy, Steinbeck's Typewriter: Essays on His Art, was published in 1996. Through the Author's Guild, it was reprinted in paperback in 2012 by iUniverse, with a new preface. The book collects nine fully revised and updated essays published by DeMott between 1980 and 1995. Of this trilogy, eminent Steinbeck scholar John Ditsky writes in John Steinbeck and the Critics: "DeMott's trilogy is unique, not simply formalistically. No one else has done anything like it in terms of original coverage."

In 1984-85, DeMott took leave from Ohio University to become a visiting professor of English and director of the Steinbeck Research Center at San Jose State University in California, for which he acquired $85,000 in scholarly materials, most of them unpublished correspondence and manuscripts. He helped launch, then served on, the editorial board of the Steinbeck Quarterly for its entire run, from 1969 to 1988, and he served on the editorial board of the Steinbeck Newsletter (later Steinbeck Studies) from 1994 to 2005, and is also since 2015 on the Editorial Board of Steinbeck Review. 1n 1987 DeMott was awarded Ball State University's Burkhardt Prize for Outstanding Contributions to Steinbeck Studies, and in 2006 he received the National Steinbeck Museum's Trustees Award at a ceremony in Salinas, CA.

DeMott is an internationally respected expert on Steinbeck, having written authoritative introductions and notes for three Steinbeck novels in Penguin Book's Classic Series—The Grapes of Wrath (1992, rev. 2006); To a God Unknown (1996), and Sweet Thursday (2008). He also served as main editor for three volumes of the Library of America's series on Steinbeck—Novels and Stories, 1932–1937 (1994); The Grapes of Wrath and Other Writings, 1936–1941 (1996); and Novels, 1942–1952 (2001)—and co-edited a fourth—Travels with Charley and Later Novels, 1947–1962 (2007)—with his former doctoral student Brian Railsback. He consulted on and appeared in the Learning Channel's Emmy-nominated documentary film on The Grapes of Wrath (2000), in "Novel Reflections on the American Dream," a PBS American Masters series television documentary on American writers (April, 2007), and in a joint U.S. State Department-Georgian (Russia) documentary film, Steinbeck and A Russian Journal 60 Years Later (2008). Several of his limited edition publications on Steinbeck, including Your Only Weapon Is Your Work: A Letter by John Steinbeck to Dennis Murphy, and “A Play to Be Played”: John Steinbeck on Stage and Screen, 1935–1960, are reprinted in Luchen Li, ed., Dictionary of Literary Biography, Volume 309: John Steinbeck: A Documentary Volume (Gale, 2005). A major critical summation, "Prospects for the Study of John Steinbeck," written with Brian Railsback, appeared in Jackson R. Bryer and Richard Kopley, eds., Resources for American Literary Study (AMS Press, 2009). In 2009, DeMott provided a new preface for the online version of Steinbeck's Reading, which is available on the Martha H. Cox Center for Steinbeck Studies website. His Penguin Classics edition of The Grapes of Wrath was chosen as the university-wide text for Cornell University's 2009 New Student Reading Project, and is the text of choice for the National Endowment for the Arts' annual Big Read project.

In addition to teaching American literature at Ohio University, DeMott has also regularly taught an introductory poetry workshop in the Creative Writing program. He has published poetry in numerous literary magazines including Cimarron Review, Southern Review, Georgia Review, Lake Effect, North Dakota Quarterly, Small Pond, Southern Poetry Review, Ontario Review, Southern Humanities Review, Tar River Poetry, Texas Review, Quarterly West, Spoon River Poetry Review, Windsor Review, and elsewhere. His first book of poems, News of Loss, was published in 1995 by Bottom Dog Press as part of a chapbook collection entitled Men and Women/Women and Men. His second, The Weather in Athens: Poems, was also published by Bottom Dog Press in 2001 in Two Midwest Voices, which also included poet Jerry Roscoe's Mirror Lake. That book won the 2002 Book Award in Poetry from the Ohioana Library Association. DeMott's third collection, Brief and Glorious Transit, a chapbook of prose poems, was published by Pudding House Press in 2007. In 2005, in recognition of his long service as faculty advisor to Quarter After Eight, a national journal of poetic prose founded in 1994, its editors (Ohio University English Department graduate students) instituted the annual Robert J. DeMott Short Prose Contest.

DeMott's continuing scholarly and literary interests have led him to publish Dave Smith: A Literary Archive, an annotated bio-bibliography and personal memoir (Ohio University Libraries, 2000), and Conversations with Jim Harrison (University Press of Mississippi, 2002, with an updated edition slated for 2019), a collection of interviews by the author and screenwriter, best known for the novella Legends of the Fall. DeMott also provided the introduction for Jim Harrison: A Comprehensive Bibliography, 1964–2008 (University of Nebraska Press, 2009), by Gregg Orr and Beef Torrey. Most recently, DeMott's sporting interests have led to “Of Fish and Men,” an essay on Steinbeck and fly fishing in American Fly Fisher, 32 (Fall 2006), and to Afield: American Writers on Bird Dogs (Skyhorse, 2010; paperback 2014), and Astream: American Writers on Fly Fishing (Skyhorse, 2012; paperback 2014). The former is a collection of 23 original essays by American novelists, poets, and essayists—including co-editor Dave Smith, Tom Brokaw, Jim Harrison, Tom McGuane, Richard Ford, Craig Nova, Clyde Edgerton, Guy de la Valdene, and others—on the joys and tribulations of bird hunting and living with the setters, pointers, spaniels, and retrievers required to do it. The latter, which is dedicated to fly fishing author and publishing legend Nick Lyons, includes 31 original essays on the art of fly fishing by Harrison, McGuane, de la Valdene, Nova, Michael Keaton, Russell Chatham, Jim Fergus, Ted Leeson, Pam Houston, Kim Barnes, Robert Wrigley, Kate Fox, Ron Ellis, Margot Page, Chris Dombrowski, Paul Schullery, Sydney Lea, Nick Lyons and others. Demott's most recent book is Angling Days: A Fly Fisher's Journal (Skyhorse, 2016), an essay style selection of his decades-long fishing journal project.

== Selected bibliography ==
- Editor, with Sanford Marovitz- Artful Thunder: Versions of the Romantic Tradition in American Literature in Honor of Howard P. Vincent (1975)
- Steinbeck's Reading: A Catalogue of Books Owned and Borrowed (1984)
- Editor- Working Days: The Journals of the Grapes of Wrath, 1938–1941 (1989)
- Author of Introduction- The Grapes of Wrath by John Steinbeck (1992; rev. 2006)
- Chief Editor- Library of America's 4-Volume Steinbeck project (1994–2007)
- Editor, with Donald Coers and Paul Ruffin-After The Grapes of Wrath: Essays on John Steinbeck in Honor of Tetsumaro Hayashi (1995)
- Steinbeck's Typewriter: Essays on His Art (1996)
- Author/Editor- Dave Smith: A Literary Archive (2000)
- The Weather in Athens in Two Midwest Voices (2001)
- Editor- Conversations with Jim Harrison (2002)
- Author of Introduction- Jim Harrison: A Comprehensive Bibliography, 1964–2008 (2009)
