= Thomas Steinbeck =

American writer and son of John Steinbeck

- Born: Thomas Myles Steinbeck; August 2, 1944; New York City, U.S.
- Died: August 11, 2016 (aged 72); Santa Barbara, California, U.S.
- Education: California Institute of the Arts; University of California, Los Angeles
- Occupations: Screenwriter and novelist
- Parent(s): John Steinbeck (father); Gwyndolyn Conger (mother)
- Relatives: John Steinbeck IV (brother)
- Writing career
- Period: 20th century
- Genres: Fiction, screenplays

Thomas Myles Steinbeck (August 2, 1944 – August 11, 2016) was an American screenwriter, photographer, and journalist. He published numerous works of fiction, including short stories and novels. He was the elder son of American novelist John Steinbeck.

== Life and work ==
=== Early years ===
Thomas ("Thom") Steinbeck was born in Manhattan, New York City, to American novelist John Steinbeck and his second wife, singer-composer Gwyndolyn Conger on August 2, 1944. His younger brother John Steinbeck IV was born two years later. His parents' marriage dissolved four years after he was born, and subsequently Thom spent a great deal of time with his father, whom he credited for instilling in him not only a passion for the world's great writers, but also a recognition of how language and poetic rhythms affect individuals and society in general. He had a good relationship with his famous father, saying that he would rate him "an eight-and-a-half or a nine" on a ten-point scale.

Thom was educated at a number of East Coast boarding schools. As he told an interviewer in 2011:

My mother was difficult, to put it lightly. She was a drinker. And the only way my father could save me from her was to put me into boarding schools on the East Coast from the time I was in third grade.

When not in school or on holiday, Thom and his brother traveled widely with their father to Europe, Greece, and North Africa. In 1961, the family spent a year traveling the world with a young teacher named Terrence McNally, whom the elder Steinbeck hired as a tutor for his sons. McNally later gained acclaim as a playwright and won four Tony Awards and an Emmy.

After high school, Thom Steinbeck studied animation at the California Institute of the Arts, then went on to study film at the UCLA School of Theater, Film and Television. The Vietnam War cut his studies short.

=== Military service ===
Steinbeck trained to serve with Armed Forces Radio and Television at Fort Knox, but arrived in Vietnam on the second day of the 1968 Tet Offensive and was immediately reassigned as a helicopter door gunner. Afterward, he resumed work as a combat photographer (he once said that "we had a fantasy that somehow we could take the photograph that could stop the war") and returned to his original posting with AFVN as a television production specialist. After his service, he returned to Vietnam, Laos, and Cambodia as a journalist and photographer.

=== Writer and filmmaker ===
Upon his return to the U.S., Steinbeck wrote and crewed on a number of documentaries, films and television projects. During the next 25 years, he wrote his own original screenplays and documentaries and screenplay adaptations of his father's work. The latter included screenplays based on In Dubious Battle, The Pearl, and Travels With Charley.

At age 58, Steinbeck published his first book, Down to a Soundless Sea (2002), a series of short stories based upon the original settlers of Big Sur, California, in the late 19th and early 20th centuries. The book was translated into seven languages, an audio version, and a large print edition, and was part of Oprah's Book Club. In 2010, Simon & Schuster published his first novel, In the Shadow of the Cypress. His second novel, The Silver Lotus, was released in November 2011 by Counterpoint Press.

Steinbeck contributed to the My California Project, a collection of short stories by 27 California authors. Sales from the book were used to help save the struggling California Arts Council. This book went into three printings, and the project helped the Council reach financial solvency.

=== Personal life ===
In addition to writing and producing, Steinbeck was an active public speaker and teacher, who often lectured on American literature, creative writing, and the communication arts. He served as a board member of both the National Steinbeck Center in Salinas, California and The Center for Steinbeck Studies at San Jose State University. Once every year, he personally presented the John Steinbeck Award through his foundation, The John Steinbeck Family Foundation in affiliation with The Center for Steinbeck Studies.

Steinbeck was an advocate for authors' rights. In 2009, he and his friend folk singer Arlo Guthrie brought a copyright infringement lawsuit against Google that was eventually settled.

At the time of his death, Steinbeck lived with his wife Gail in Santa Barbara, California. According to his family, he died of chronic obstructive pulmonary disease, nine days after his 72nd birthday.

== Selected works ==
Fiction

- Down to a Soundless Sea. (New York: Ballantine Books, 2002) ISBN 9780345455765 (hardcover, 1st ed.) – short story collection
- In the Shadow of the Cypress (New York: Gallery Books, 2010) ISBN 9781439168257 (hardcover, 1st ed.) – a novel
- The Silver Lotus (Berkeley, CA: Counterpoint, 2011) ISBN 9781582437781 (hardcover, 1st ed.) – a novel
- Dr. Greenlaw and the Zulu Princess (Post Hill Press, 2013) ASIN B00GS3V0SO (eBook edition only) – a novella
- Cabbages and Kings (Post Hill Press, 2013) ISBN 9781618689832 (eBook edition only) – a novella
- Mrs. Penngelli and the Pirate (Post Hill Press, 2013) ISBN 9781618689856 (eBook edition only) – a novella

Contributor

- Light, Melanie. Valley of Shadows and Dreams, with Ken Light (Photographer), Thomas Steinbeck (Foreword); (Berkeley, CA: Heyday Books, 2012) ISBN 9781597141727
- Kannard, Brian. Steinbeck: Citizen Spy, with Thomas Steinbeck (note to the Introduction); (Nashville, TN: Grave Distractions Publications, 2013) ISBN 9780989029391
- Brode, Benjamin. In Search of the Dark Watchers: Landscapes and Lore of Big Sur, with Thomas Steinbeck (Field Notes); (Steinbeck Press, 2014) ISBN 9780990663706
