= Steigerwald (surname) =

Steigerwald is a surname. Notable people with the surname include:

- Bill Steigerwald, American author and former journalist
- John Steigerwald (born 1948), American sports reporter, commentator and former sports anchor
- Paul Steigerwald (born 1954), American sportscaster
- Peter Steigerwald, American comic book artist
