= John Steinbeck Award =

The John Steinbeck Award: "In The Souls of the People" (also called the John Steinbeck "In the Souls of the People" Award, or just the John Steinbeck Award), is a near-annual award given to an individual or group that has contributed to society in the spirit of John Steinbeck. The award is given to artists who capture "Steinbeck’s empathy, commitment to democratic values, and belief in the dignity of people who by circumstance are pushed to the fringes." The award is presented by the Martha Heasley Cox Center for Steinbeck Studies at San Jose State University, with the sanction of the Steinbeck Estate.

== Steinbeck's legacy ==
The phrase "in the souls of the people" comes from Chapter 25 of The Grapes of Wrath and captures the writer's enduring legacy as an engaged and socially aware artist. From the 1930s on Steinbeck wrote about "the people," his heart open to the longing, loneliness, despair and triumph of those on the edges. Americans were his people, and his last book, America and Americans (1966) expresses his enduring love for a democratic nation. Thomas Steinbeck wrote that the awardee is a "planetary patriot," which means, a person who, in keeping with Maurice Steinbeck's understanding of the highest aspirations of an artist, "stands up against the stones of condemnation, and speaks for those who are given no real voice in the halls of justice, or the halls of government. By doing so these people will naturally become the enemies of the political status quo."

== History of the Award ==
The Steinbeck Award was first presented in 1996 to Bruce Springsteen in a sold-out event at the Event Center of San Jose State University. Ted Cady, the chair of the Martha Heasley Cox Center's award selection committee and former Event Director for the Student Union, has organized all of the Award presentations. John Steinbeck's elder son, Thomas Steinbeck, participated in several of the award ceremonies, including those honoring Sean Penn and Rachel Maddow.

== Past recipients ==
No recipients were awarded in 1997, 2000, 2001, 2005, 2006, 2008, 2009, 2011, 2021, or 2025.

Year	Recipient	Citation
1996	Bruce Springsteen	
1998	John Sayles	
1999	Arthur Miller	
2002	Jackson Browne	
2002	Studs Terkel	
2003	Joan Baez	
2004	Sean Penn	
2007	Garrison Keillor	
2010	Dolores Huerta	
2010	Michael Moore	
2012	Rachel Maddow	
2012	John Mellencamp	
2013	Ken Burns	
2014	Khaled Hosseini	
2015	Ruby Bridges	
2016	Francisco Jiménez	
2017	Bob Woodruff	
2018	Bill McKibben	
2019	Mumford & Sons	
2020	José Andrés	
2022	Jaqueline Woodson	
2023	Jane Fonda	
2024	Gene Luen Yang	
2026	Barbara Kingsolver	
