= Travels with Charley =

1962 travelogue by John Steinbeck

Travels with Charley: In Search of America
- First edition cover
- Author: John Steinbeck
- Language: English
- Genre: Travelogue
- Publisher: The Viking Press (US); William Heinemann (UK)
- Publication date: July 1962
- Publication place: New York, N.Y., United States; London, United Kingdom
- Media type: Print
- Pages: 288
- OCLC: 419514

Travels with Charley: In Search of America is a 1962 travelogue written by American author John Steinbeck. It depicts a 1960 road trip around the United States made by Steinbeck, in the company of his standard poodle Charley. Steinbeck wrote that he was moved by a desire to see his country because he made his living writing about it. He wrote of having many questions going into his journey, the main one being "What are Americans like today?" However, he found that he had concerns about much of the "new America" he saw.

Steinbeck tells of traveling throughout the United States in a specially made camper he named Rocinante, after Don Quixote's horse. His travels start in Long Island, New York, and roughly follow the outer border of the United States, from Maine to the Pacific Northwest, down into his native Salinas Valley in California across to Texas, through the Deep South, and then back to New York. Such a trip encompassed nearly 10,000 miles.

According to Thom Steinbeck, the author's oldest son, the reason for the trip was that Steinbeck knew he was dying and wanted to see his country one last time. The younger Steinbeck has said he was surprised that his stepmother allowed his father to make the trip; his heart condition meant he could have died at any time. A new introduction to the 50th anniversary edition of the book cautioned readers that "it would be a mistake to take this travelogue too literally, as Steinbeck was at heart a novelist."

== Summary ==
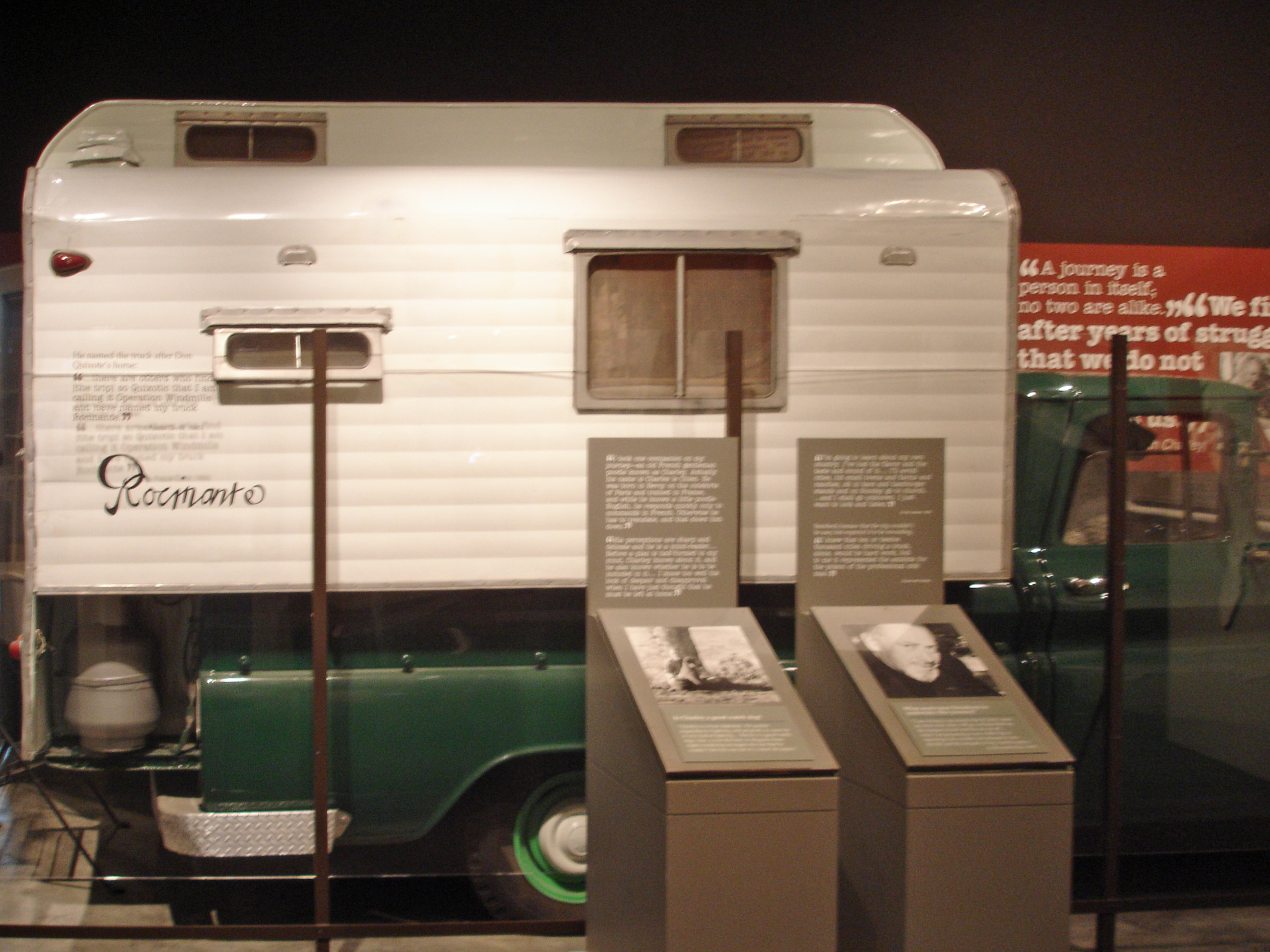
Rocinante, Steinbeck's camper truck which he used to travel across the United States in 1960, now at the National Steinbeck Center, Salinas, California

=== Part One ===
Steinbeck opened the book by describing his lifelong wanderlust and his preparations to rediscover the country he felt he had lost touch with after living in New York City and traveling in Europe for 20 years. He was 58 years old in 1960 and nearing the end of his career, but he felt that when he was writing about America and its people he "was writing of something [he] did not know about, and it seemed to [him] that in a so-called writer this is criminal" (p. 6). He bought a new GMC pickup truck, which he named Rocinante, and had it fitted with a custom camper-shell for his journey. At the last minute, he decided to take his wife's 10-year-old French Poodle Charley, with whom he has many mental conversations as a device for exploring his thoughts. He planned on leaving after Labor Day from his summer home in Sag Harbor on the eastern end of Long Island, but his trip was delayed about two weeks due to Hurricane Donna, which made a direct hit on Long Island. Steinbeck's exploits in saving his boat during the middle of the hurricane, which he details, foreshadow his fearless, or even reckless, state of mind and his courage in undertaking a long, arduous and ambitious cross-country road trip by himself.

=== Part Two ===
Steinbeck began his trip by traveling by ferry from Long Island to Connecticut, passing the U.S. Navy submarine base at New London where many of the new nuclear submarines were stationed. He talked to a sailor stationed on a sub who enjoyed being on them because "they offer all kinds of – future". Steinbeck credited uncertainty about the future to rapid technological and political changes. He mentioned the wastefulness of American cities and society and lamented the large amount of waste that resulted from everything being "packaged."

Later he had a conversation with a New England farmer. The two concluded that a combination of fear and uncertainty about the future limited their discussion of the coming election between Richard Nixon and John F. Kennedy. Steinbeck enjoyed learning about people by eating breakfast in roadside restaurants and listening to morning radio programs, though he noted that, "If 'Teen-Age Angel' [sic] is top of the list in Maine, it is the top of the list in Montana" (35), showing the ubiquity of pop culture brought on by Top 40 radio and mass media technologies.

He drove north into Maine. On the way he noted a similarity among the "summer" stores, which were all closed for the winter. Antique shops sold old "junk" that Steinbeck would have bought if he thought he had room for it, noting that he had more junk at home than most stores. He stopped at a little restaurant just outside the town of Bangor where he learned that other people's sour attitudes about life can greatly affect your own attitude. Steinbeck then went to Deer Isle, Maine, to visit the friend of his literary agent Elizabeth Otis, who vacationed there each summer. Otis always raved about Deer Isle, but could never describe exactly what it was that was so captivating. While driving to Deer Isle, Steinbeck stopped and asked for directions. He later learned from a native that it wasn't wise to ask for directions in Maine because locals don't like to talk to tourists and tend to give them incorrect information. When Steinbeck arrived at the house on Deer Isle where he was supposed to stay, he met a terse female cat named George and ate the best lobster he had ever tasted, fresh from the local waters. Next, he drove to northern Maine, where he spent the night in a field alongside a group of French-speaking migrant potato pickers from Canada, with whom he shared some French vintage. Steinbeck's descriptions of the workers was sympathetic and even romanticized, a clear nod to his amazing description of "The Grapes of Wrath," which made him famous.

Steinbeck then traveled west across Upstate New York to Niagara Falls and Buffalo, then on to Chicago by way of western New York and the northern tops of Pennsylvania, Ohio and Indiana. At the Canadian border in Niagara Falls he decided not to cut across southern Ontario to get to Detroit faster, as he planned, because Charley didn't have the proper inoculations to get back in the USA. After his encounter with American border officials, he discussed his dislike of the government. He said the government makes a person feel small because it doesn't matter what you say, if it's not on paper and certified by an official, the government doesn't care. As he traveled on, he described how wherever he went people's attitudes and beliefs changed. All states differ by how people may talk to one another or treat other people. For example, as he drove into the Midwest there was a marked increase in the population from state to state. Instead of small New England villages he was skirting the growing cities of great production such as Youngstown, Cleveland, Akron, Toledo, South Bend and Gary. The roads, specifically U.S. 20 and the stretch of Interstate 90 between Buffalo and Madison, Ohio, were wider and faster and filled with traffic. Also, everywhere he went, people's views changed. For example, when he was in New England he saw that people there spoke tersely and usually waited for the newcomer to come up to him and initiate conversation. However, in Midwestern cities, people were more outgoing and were willing to come right up to him. He explained how strangers talked freely without caution as a sense of longing for something new and being somewhere other than the place they were. They were so used to their everyday life that when someone new came to town, they were eager to explore new information and imagine new places. It was as if a new change had entered their life every time someone from out of town came into their state.

Traveling further, Steinbeck discovered that technology was advancing so quickly as to give Americans more and more instant gratification, whether it was soup from vending machines or mobile homes. Steinbeck was intrigued by mobile homes. He thought they showed a new way of living for America, reflecting the attitude that if you don't like a given place, you should be able to pick up and leave. He reflects on rootedness, finds much to admire both ways, going and staying, and finds a secret language and camaraderie among truckers. At the end of the section, Steinbeck arrives in Chicago to meet up with his wife. After dropping off Charley at a groomer's, he gets to his hotel early and finds his room not ready yet. Being tired and scruffy, he makes a deal with the hotel to borrow a room which hasn't been cleaned up after its last occupant, and once in the room investigates what the previous tenant, whom he refers to as "Harry," has left behind, constructing a half-grounded, half-fictional idea of him as a traveling businessman who hires a woman to spend the evening with, though Steinbeck believes neither enjoyed their time that much.

=== Part Three ===
Steinbeck traveled across Wisconsin and Minnesota toward North Dakota. He traveled along U.S. Highway 10 through St. Paul on an "Evacuation Route" that would be used in the case of a nuclear attack by the Soviet Union. He called it "a road designed by fear" (p. 129) and it sparked one of Steinbeck's many realizations about American society: the fact that the country was driven by fear. Once through St. Paul, he went to Sauk Centre, the birthplace of writer Sinclair Lewis, but was disheartened to talk to locals at a restaurant who had no understanding of who Lewis was.

Stopping at a diner for directions, Steinbeck realized that Americans are often oblivious to their immediate surroundings and their own culture. He also complained that Americans have put "cleanliness first at the expense of taste" (141). He lamented that "It looks as though the natural contentiousness of people has died" (142) and he worried that Americans had grown too comfortable and no longer interested in risk-taking and rebellion, two of the traits that made the country great. Crossing into North Dakota, Steinbeck said that Fargo always fascinated him as a place where the winters were (seemingly) colder and the summers hotter than anywhere else. He found the real Fargo to be just like any other busy American town, but said the reality of Fargo didn't interfere with his old mental image of Fargo. Driving across North Dakota, Steinbeck decided that the real dividing line between east and west was at the Missouri River. East of the river, odors and scenes were essentially "eastern"; west of the river was where "The West" really started. Steinbeck crossed North Dakota into Montana, where he declared, "I am in love with Montana." He explained Montana was a place unaffected by television; a place with kind, laid-back individuals. "It seemed to me that the frantic bustle of America was not in Montana (158)." He went to the battlefield of Little Big Horn. He traveled through the "Injun Country" and thought of an author who wrote a novel about the war against the Nez Perce tribes. Steinbeck and Charley then traveled to Yellowstone National Park, a place packed with natural wonders that he said "is no more representative of America than Disneyland." In the park the gentle and non-confrontational Charley showed a side of himself Steinbeck had never seen: Charley's canine instincts caused him to bark like crazy at the bears he saw by the side of the road.

The pair next stopped briefly at the Great Divide in the Rocky Mountains before continuing on to Seattle. Steinbeck reflected on seeing the Columbia River and how the American explorers Lewis and Clark must have felt when they came west for the first time. He noted the changes the West Coast had undergone in the last 20 years (p. 180): "It was only as I approached Seattle that the unbelievable change became apparent...I wonder why progress looks so much like destruction." (181) Steinbeck then drove down the Pacific Coast through Oregon and California. On the way, Rocinante, Steinbeck's overloaded truck, had a flat tire and he had to change it in a rainstorm. In Steinbeck's retelling of the event, he wrote, "It was obvious that the other tire might go at any minute, and it was Sunday and it was raining and it was Oregon." (185) Though the specialized tires were hard to come by, the problem was resolved in mere hours by the unexpected generosity of a gas station attendant.

Steinbeck then visited the giant redwood trees he had come to appreciate and adore in his lifetime. He said "The vainest, most slap-happy and irreverent of men, in the presence of redwoods, goes under a spell of wonder and respect." (189) When Charley refuses to urinate on the trees (a "salute" for a dog, as Steinbeck remarks), Steinbeck opines: "'If I thought he did it out of spite or to make a joke,' I said to myself, 'I'd kill him out of hand.'" (193)

Steinbeck grew up in the Salinas Valley region of California in Monterey County and he describes his revisit to the area after a 20-year absence in detail. Remarking on the many changes, he notes the population growth and the progress the Monterey area had made. He then visited a bar from his youth where he met his old friend Johnny Garcia and learned that a lot of regulars and childhood chums had died. He then seemed to say goodbye to his hometown, on pages 205 to 208, for the last time, making an allusion to "You Can't Go Home Again, a book by Thomas Wolfe." Climbing Fremont Peak, the highest point in what would someday be called "Steinbeck Country," he said goodbye to the place he had made famous in his novels. "I printed once more on my eyes, south, west, and north, and then we hurried away from the permanent and changeless past where my mother is always shooting a wildcat and my father is always burning his name with his love." (208).

=== Part Four ===
Heading east again, Steinbeck then cut through the Mojave Desert, where he almost decided to shoot a pair of curious coyotes (but didn't). Reflecting on the resiliency of desert life, he opened a can of dog food for the coyotes instead. He made his way to Texas, where he and his wife Elaine attended what he called a Thanksgiving Day "orgy" at a wealthy cattle ranch near Amarillo. Steinbeck, whose third wife Elaine was a Texan, talked at length about the Lone Star State and its citizens and culture. He felt that "people either passionately love or passionately hate Texas," which he described as a "mystique closely approximating a religion," but he loved and respected Texas.

After detailing his Thanksgiving at the ranch, Steinbeck drove to New Orleans where he witnessed the angry and racist protests by white mothers outside the recently integrated William Frantz Elementary School in the Ninth Ward. The encounter depressed him.

By the time Steinbeck nears Virginia, he says that in his heart, his journey was over. His journey had ceased to be a journey and became something that he had to endure until he reached his home in New York again. After passing through Pennsylvania and New Jersey, Steinbeck finds himself back in New York where, ironically, he realizes that he is lost and has to ask for directions home. As he spent a good deal of his journey lost, it becomes evident at the end of the story that being lost is a metaphor for how much America has changed in Steinbeck's eyes. America, it seems, is in a sense directionless and is therefore endangered as it moves into an uncertain future marked by huge population shifts, racial tensions, technological and industrial change, and unprecedented environmental destruction.

== Best seller ==
Travels With Charley was published by the Viking Press in mid-1962, a few months before Steinbeck was awarded the Nobel Prize in Literature. The book reached #1 on the New York Times Best Seller list (Non-Fiction) on October 21, 1962, where it stayed for one week, replaced by Rachel Carson's Silent Spring on October 28.

== In the arts ==
In the Steinbeck novel The Pastures of Heaven, one of the characters regards Robert Louis Stevenson's Travels with a Donkey in the Cevennes as one of the single greatest works of English literature and eventually names his infant son Robert Louis. Later, Steinbeck and his wife Elaine were inspired by Stevenson in choosing the title Travels with Charley.

In Stephen King's 1996 novel Desperation, a character is on a cross-country motorcycle trip to get inspiration for writing a book. While thinking back to Steinbeck's journey, the motorcyclist comes up with the title "Travels with Harley", an idea that is later harshly mocked by another character.

In 2010, the Dutch journalist and author Geert Mak traveled the same route Steinbeck had followed, basing himself on the notes from Steinbeck's diary as well as the book. Mak wrote a book about it, called Reizen zonder John (translation from Dutch: "Traveling without John"). He reviews American society and comments on the changes he encounters since Steinbeck traveled the same parts of the country.

In 2018, Minnesota-based Bluegrass group Trampled by Turtles released a track entitled "Thank you, John Steinbeck." This track references the book with the lines: "I left in a hurry, my clothes barely buttoned/ And 'Travels With Charley' tucked under my arm."

In 1973, the Beach Boys wrote a song for their Holland album called "California Saga", a three-part song with the following lyrics:

Have you ever been down Salinas way
Where Steinbeck found the valley?
And he wrote about it the way it was
in his travelin's with Charley
And have you ever walked down through the sycamores
Where the farmhouse used to be?
There, the monarch's autumn journey ends
On a windswept cypress tree

== Criticism ==
Steinbeck's narrative has been challenged as being partly fictionalized. Bill Steigerwald, a former staff writer for the Pittsburgh Post-Gazette and an associate editor for the Pittsburgh Tribune-Review, followed the route as it is laid out in the Travels with Charley, and wrote about it in a 2011 article titled "Sorry, Charley," published in Reason magazine. He later self-published his analysis in a 2012 book, titled Dogging Steinbeck. Steigerwald concluded that Travels contains such a level of invention, and Steinbeck took such great liberty with the truth, that the work has limited claim to being non-fiction.

He uses the dialogue with the itinerant Shakespearean actor near Alice, North Dakota, to exemplify his point. On October 12, Steinbeck wrote a letter to his wife describing a motel in the Badlands where he was staying, on the same date (October 12) as the supposed conversation in Alice. Given that the Badlands are some 350 miles away from Alice, Steigerwald concluded that the conversation with the actor was unlikely to have occurred. Steigerwald also challenges the idea that Steinbeck was "roughing it" during his journey, or that it was a solo voyage, save for Charley. Steigerwald wrote:

Steinbeck was almost never alone on his trip. Out of 75 days away from New York, he traveled with, stayed with, and slept with his beloved wife, Elaine, on 45 days. On 17 other days he stayed at motels and busy truck stops and trailer courts, or parked his camper on the property of friends. Steinbeck didn't rough it. With Elaine he stayed at some of the country's top hotels, motels, and resorts, not to mention two weeks at the Steinbeck family cottage in Pacific Grove, California, and a week at a Texas cattle ranch for millionaires. By himself, as he admits in Charley, he often stayed in luxurious motels.

Steigerwald was not the only person to claim Steinbeck did not write a purely nonfictional travelogue; Steinbeck's son believed that his father invented much of the dialogue in the book, saying: "He just sat in his camper and wrote all that [expletive]."

Steinbeck scholars generally have not disputed Steigerwald's findings, but they have disputed their importance.

For example, Susan Shillinglaw, a professor of English at San Jose State University and scholar at the National Steinbeck Center, told the New York Times: "Any writer has the right to shape materials, and undoubtedly Steinbeck left things out. That doesn't make the book a lie." In regard to the supposed conversations, she said: "Whether or not Steinbeck met that actor where he says he did, he could have met such a figure at some point in his life. And perhaps he enhanced some of the anecdotes with the waitress. Does it really matter that much?"

Jay Parini, author of a Steinbeck biography, who wrote the introduction for the Penguin edition of Travels, told the New York Times:

I have always assumed that to some degree it's a work of fiction. Steinbeck was a fiction writer, and here he's shaping events, massaging them. He probably wasn't using a tape recorder. But I still feel there's an authenticity there. Does this shake my faith in the book? Quite the opposite. I would say hooray for Steinbeck. If you want to get at the spirit of something, sometimes it's important to use the techniques of a fiction writer. Why has this book stayed in the American imagination, unlike, for example, Michael Harrington's The Other America, which came out at the same time?

Bill Barich, who wrote Long Way Home: On the Trail of Steinbeck's America, also a retracing of Steinbeck's footsteps, said:

I'm fairly certain that Steinbeck made up most of the book. The dialogue is so wooden. Steinbeck was extremely depressed, in really bad health, and was discouraged by everyone from making the trip. He was trying to recapture his youth, the spirit of the knight-errant. But at that point he was probably incapable of interviewing ordinary people. He'd become a celebrity and was more interested in talking to Dag Hammarskjold and Adlai Stevenson. The die was probably cast long before he hit the road, and a lot of what he wrote was colored by the fact that he was so ill. But I still take seriously a lot of what he said about the country. His perceptions were right on the money about the death of localism, the growing homogeneity of America, the trashing of the environment. He was prescient about all that.

The writer Geert Mak, who made the same trip in 2010, discovered factual inconsistencies and physical impossibilities when trying to replicate Steinbeck's traveling schedule. He too came to the conclusion that Steinbeck had probably invented much of what happened, only to give rise to his musings about the country, which the Dutch writer nevertheless considered to be truthful and valuable.

Published in 2012, the 50th anniversary edition of Travels with Charley included a disclaimer by Parini, who wrote:

Indeed, it would be a mistake to take this travelogue too literally, as Steinbeck was at heart a novelist, and he added countless touches – changing the sequence of events, elaborating on scenes, inventing dialogue – that one associates more with fiction than nonfiction. It should be kept in mind, when reading this travelogue, that Steinbeck took liberties with the facts, inventing freely when it served his purposes, using everything in the arsenal of the novelist to make this book a readable, vivid narrative. The book remains 'true' in the way all good novels or narratives are true. That is, it provides an aesthetic vision of America at a certain time. The evocation of its people and places stay forever in the mind, and Steinbeck’s understanding of his country at this tipping point in its history was nothing short of extraordinary. It reflects his decades of observation and the years spent in honing his craft.
