= Martha Heasley Cox Center for Steinbeck Studies =

Archive and cultural center in San Jose

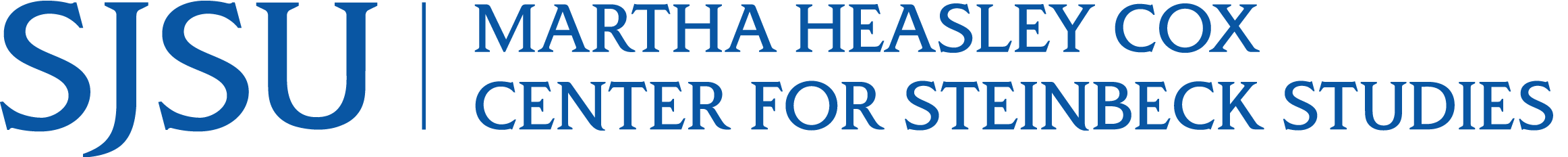

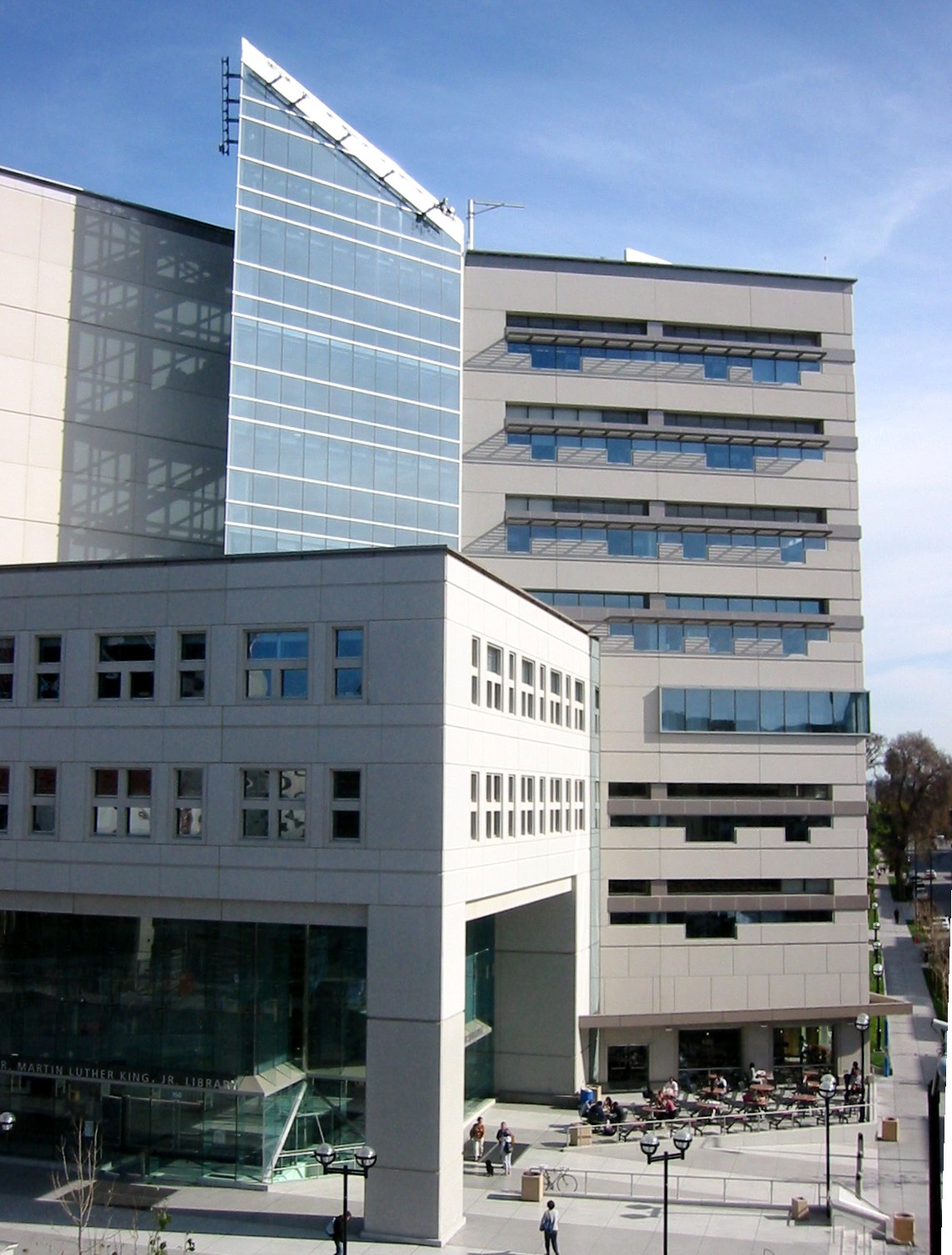
- Former name: Steinbeck Research Center (1971–1997)
- Established: 1971, 55 years ago
- Location: Dr. Martin Luther King Jr. Library, San Jose, California
- Collections: John Steinbeck
- Collection size: 50,000
- Founder: Martha Heasley Cox
- Website: www.sjsu.edu/steinbeck/

The Martha Heasley Cox Center for Steinbeck Studies is a scholarly research archive, museum and cultural center dedicated to the life, work, and legacy of American author John Steinbeck. Located in the Dr. Martin Luther King Jr. Library on the campus of San José State University in San Jose, California, the center was founded in 1971 by English professor Martha Heasley Cox, whose contributions laid the groundwork for its establishment as a hub for Steinbeck scholarship and public education. The center is the largest Steinbeck archive in the world at over 50,000 items.

== History ==
The center's origins date to 1971 when Martha Heasley Cox, then a professor of English at San José State University, recognized the need for a comprehensive archive of author John Steinbeck’s work. Cox then founded the Steinbeck Research Center, and served as its director until 1982. As a university research center, it has hosted conferences, exhibitions, and publications dedicated to exploring Steinbeck’s influence on literature and social commentary, as a cultural center it has hosted lectures, film screenings, and exhibitions that explore Steinbeck’s influence on American literature, social history, and environmentalism.

In 1975, after representing the United States at the International Steinbeck Conference in Fukuoka, Japan, Cox was contacted by Matthew Bruccoli who propositioned her to write a bibliography on Steinbeck. The endeavor took her to prestigious archives, including the Humanities Research Center at the University of Texas at Austin, the New York Public Library and the archives at Viking Press, Steinbeck’s publisher, where she accessed rare materials to build an extensive catalog of Steinbeck's work, which she then brought back to San Jose State.

In 1996, the center awarded its first John Steinbeck "In the Souls of the People" Award to musician Bruce Springsteen, inaugurating a tradition of honoring artists who demonstrate commitment to Steinbeck's ideals of courage, honesty, and concern for the underprivileged. Recipients have included renowned figures such as Arthur Miller, Rachel Maddow, and Dolores Huerta, whose work reflects the enduring relevance of Steinbeck's social advocacy.

In 1997, the center was renamed to the Martha Heasley Cox Center for Steinbeck Studies, in Cox's honor.

In 2001, the Steinbeck Fellows Program was established. which awards annual fellowships to emerging writers whose work resonates with Steinbeck's themes of social justice, ecological awareness, and empathy for the marginalized. Previous fellows have included Sara Houghteling, Vanessa Hua and A.J. Bermudez.

In 2002, the center began publishing Steinbeck Review, a peer-reviewed bi-annual journal which publishes scholarly articles, book reviews, creative writing, and original artwork which offer perspectives on Steinbeck's life.

The center has hosted the International Steinbeck Conference five times: in 2002, 2013, 2016, 2019, and 2023.

== Collections ==
The Martha Heasley Cox Center for Steinbeck Studies houses the largest collection of Steinbeck-related materials in the world at over 50,000 items. The archives contain manuscripts, letters, photographs, rare books, and memorabilia related to Steinbeck's career and personal life. It also holds significant secondary materials, including critical works, translations of Steinbeck's novels, and various media adaptations. Aside from those Cox collected herself, manuscript collections have been donated by Elaine Steinbeck, and Lee Richard Hayman.

Some of the center's most notable items include early manuscript drafts of works like The Grapes of Wrath and Of Mice and Men, and correspondence with contemporaries such as John Kenneth Galbraith, William Faulkner, Douglas Fairbanks, and Ed Ricketts.

== See also ==
- Susan Shillinglaw, center director for 18 years and Steinbeck scholar.
- National Steinbeck Center
- John Steinbeck Award
