= Rachel Maddow =

American television host and commentator (born 1973)

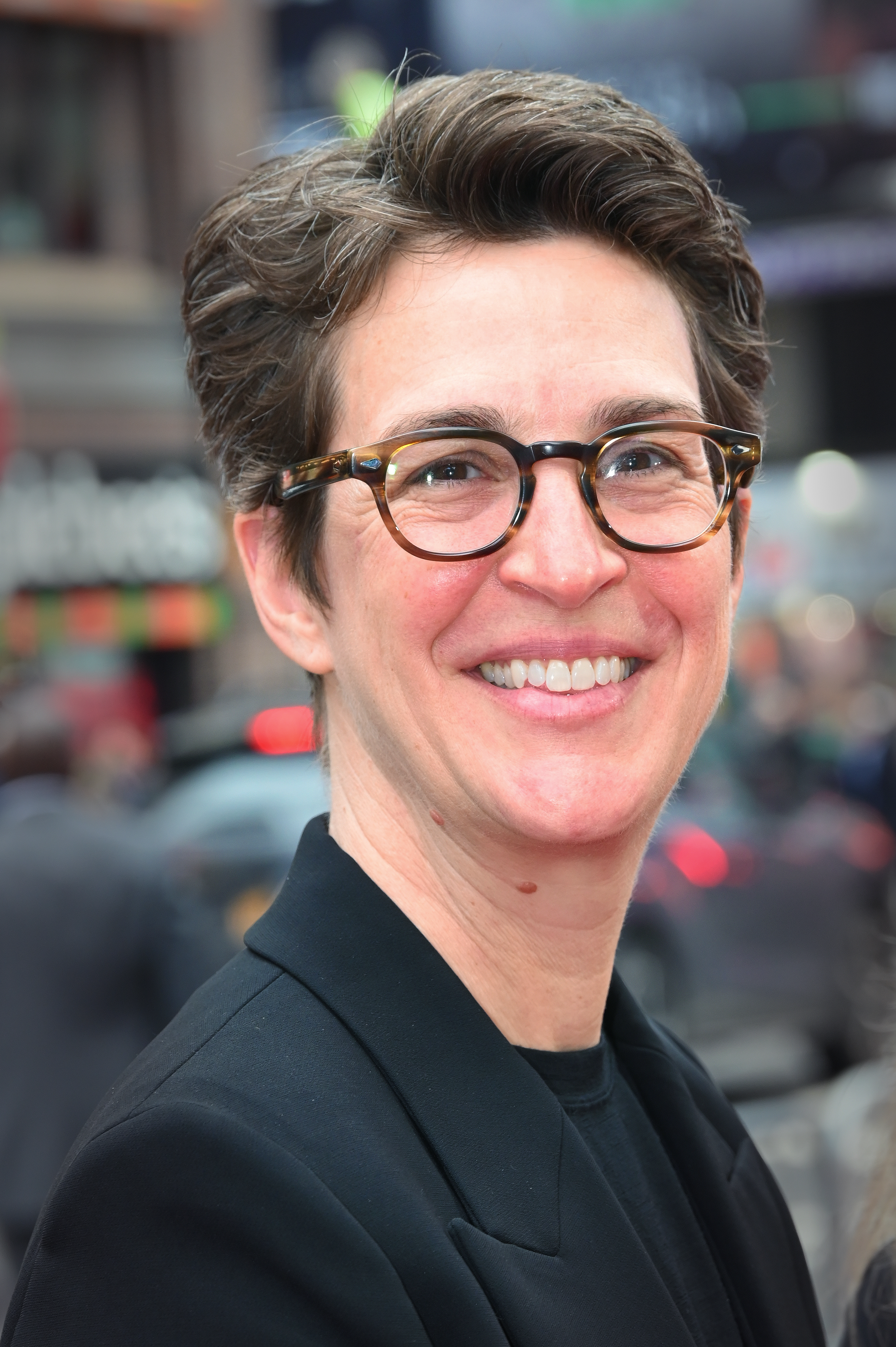
- Maddow in 2025
- Born: Rachel Anne Maddow; April 1, 1973 (age 53); Castro Valley, California, U.S.
- Education: Stanford University (BA); Lincoln College, Oxford (DPhil)
- Occupations: Television host; political commentator; author
- Years active: 1999–present
- Employers: Air America Radio (2004–2010); MSNBC/MS NOW (2008–present)
- Television: The Rachel Maddow Show
- Partner: Susan Mikula (1999–present)
- Website: www.rachelmaddow.com

Rachel Anne Maddow (/ˈmædoʊ/ MAD-oh; born April 1, 1973) is an American television news program host, author, and liberal political commentator. She hosts The Rachel Maddow Show, a weekly television show on MS NOW (formerly MSNBC), and serves as the cable network's special event co-anchor. Her syndicated talk radio program of the same name aired on Air America Radio from 2005 to 2010.

Maddow has received multiple Emmy Awards for her broadcasting work; in 2021, she also received a Grammy Award for the audiobook version of Blowout (2019).

Maddow holds a bachelor's degree in public policy from Stanford University and a doctorate in political science from the University of Oxford and is the first openly lesbian anchor to host a major prime-time news program in the United States.

== Early life and education ==
Maddow was born in Castro Valley, California. Her father, Robert B. Maddow, is a former United States Air Force captain who resigned his commission the year before her birth and then worked as a lawyer for East Bay Municipal Utility District. Her mother, Elaine (née Gosse), was a school program administrator. She has one older brother, David. Her paternal grandfather was from a Jewish family (the original family surname being Medvedof), who arrived in the United States from the Russian Empire. Her paternal grandmother was of Dutch descent. Maddow's Canadian mother, originally from Newfoundland and Labrador, has English and Irish ancestry.

Maddow has said her family is "very, very Catholic" and she grew up in a community that her mother has described as "very conservative". Maddow was a competitive athlete and participated in high school volleyball, basketball, and swimming.

Referring to John Hughes films, Maddow has described herself as being "a cross between the jock and the antisocial girl" in high school. She is a graduate of Castro Valley High School and attended Stanford University. While a freshman, she was outed as a lesbian by the college newspaper when an interview with her was published before she could tell her parents. In her senior year of high school, Maddow worked at an AIDS clinic in West Oakland.

=== Education ===
She earned a degree in public policy at Stanford in 1994. At graduation, she was awarded the John Gardner Fellowship. After graduating, she worked as an AIDS activist with ACT-UP in San Francisco.

She was the recipient of a Rhodes Scholarship and began her postgraduate study in 1995 at Lincoln College, Oxford. She had also been awarded a Marshall Scholarship the same year but turned it down in favor of the Rhodes. This made her the first openly lesbian winner of the Rhodes Scholarship. (Note: In 1990, now San Francisco lawyer John Crandon is believed to have been the first openly gay Rhodes scholar.) In 2001, she earned a Doctor of Philosophy (DPhil) in politics at the University of Oxford. Her thesis was titled "HIV/AIDS and Health Care Reform in British and American Prisons" and was supervised by Lucia Zedner.

After graduating from Oxford, Maddow worked for the ACLU’s National Prisoner Project. While at the ACLU, she authored a report Cost of Excluding Alabama State Prisoners with HIV/AIDS from Community-Based Programs. She was also author of a report Pushing for Progress: HIV/AIDS in Prisons, published by the National Minority AIDS Council in 2002.

== Radio ==
Maddow's first job as a radio host was in 1999 at WRNX (100.9 FM) in Holyoke, Massachusetts, then home to "The Dave in the Morning Show". She entered and won a contest the station held to find a new second lead for the show's principal host, Dave Brinnel. After the WRNX show, she hosted Big Breakfast on WRSI in Northampton, Massachusetts, for two years, leaving in 2004 to join the new Air America radio network. There she hosted Unfiltered along with Chuck D (of the hip hop group Public Enemy) and Lizz Winstead (co-creator of The Daily Show) until its cancellation in March 2005.

Two weeks after the cancellation of Unfiltered in April 2005, Maddow's weekday two-hour radio program, The Rachel Maddow Show, began airing; in March 2008 it gained a third hour, broadcasting from 6:00 to 9:00 p.m. Eastern Time, with David Bender filling in the third hour for the call-in section, when Maddow was on TV assignment. In 2008, the show's length returned to two hours when Maddow began the nightly MSNBC television program, also called The Rachel Maddow Show. Early in 2009, after renewing her contract with Air America, Maddow's radio show was moved to a one-hour timeslot at 5:00 a.m. Eastern Time. This iteration of the show began with a short introduction from Maddow followed by a broadcast based on the audio from the previous night's MSNBC broadcast of Maddow's television show. Little explanation or warning was given for this shift except for Maddow's comments that doing two daily shows was far too taxing. Maddow's radio show ended on January 21, 2010, when Air America ceased operations.

== Television ==
In June 2005, Maddow became a regular panelist on the MSNBC show Tucker, hosted by Tucker Carlson. During and after the November 2006 election, she was a guest on CNN's Paula Zahn Now; she was also a correspondent for The Advocate Newsmagazine, an LGBT-oriented short-form newsmagazine for Logo deriving from news items published by The Advocate. In January 2008, Maddow became an MSNBC political analyst and was a regular panelist on MSNBC's Race for the White House with David Gregory and MSNBC's election coverage as well as a frequent contributor on Countdown with Keith Olbermann.

In 2008, Maddow was the substitute host for Countdown with Keith Olbermann, her first time hosting a program on MSNBC. Maddow described herself on-air as "nervous". Keith Olbermann complimented her work, and she was brought back to host Countdown the next month. The show she hosted was the highest-rated news program among people aged 25 to 54. For her success, Olbermann ranked Maddow third in his show's segment "World's Best Persons". In July 2008, Maddow filled in again for several broadcasts. Maddow also filled in for David Gregory as host of Race for the White House.

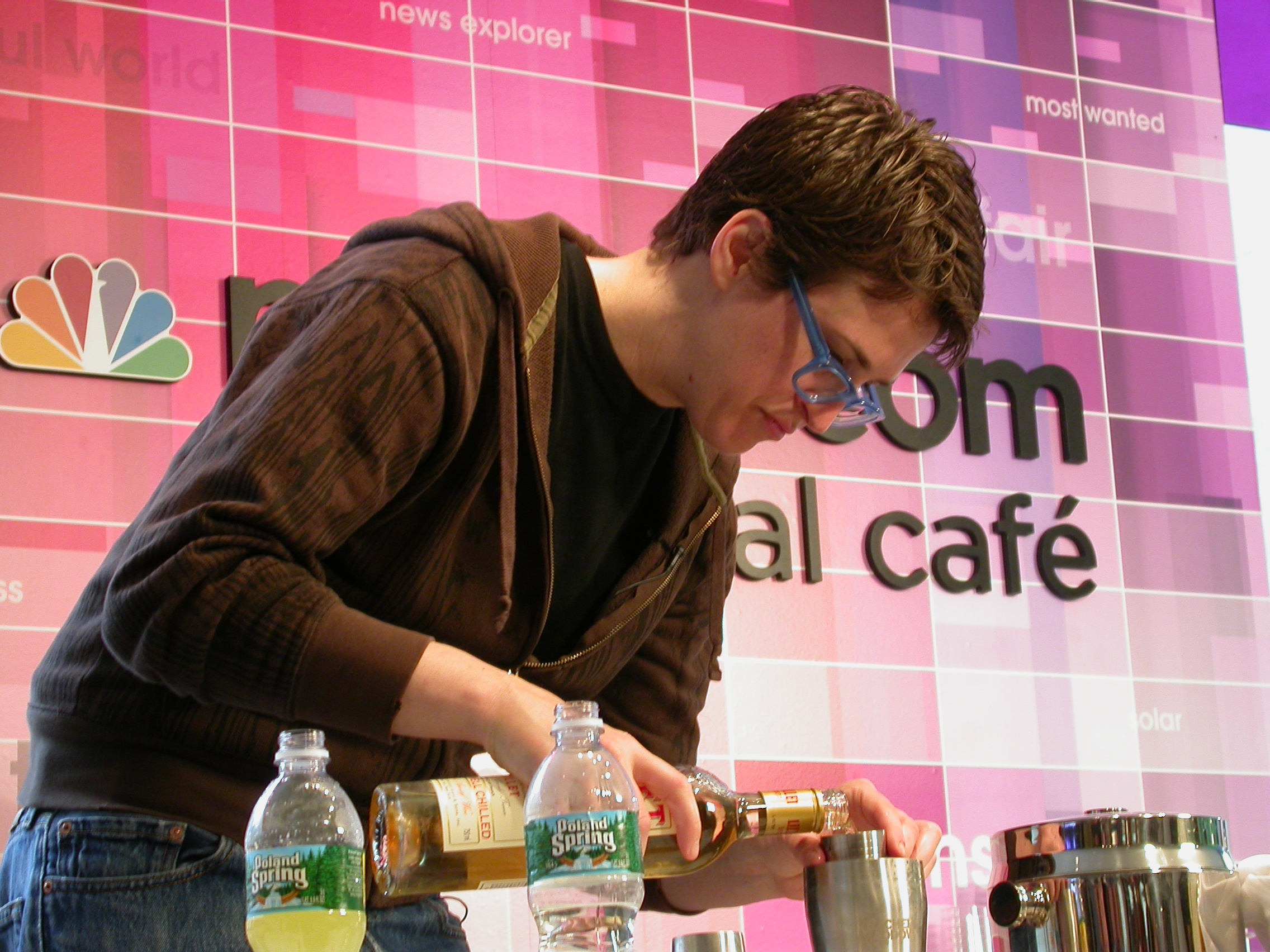
Maddow making cocktails during a Diggnation podcast recording at the msnbc.com digital café in Rockefeller Center

Olbermann advocated for Maddow to host her own show at MSNBC, and he was eventually able to persuade Phil Griffin to give her Dan Abrams' time slot.

=== The Rachel Maddow Show ===
In August 2008, MSNBC announced The Rachel Maddow Show would replace Verdict with Dan Abrams in the network's 9:00 p.m. slot the following month. Following its debut, the show topped Countdown as the highest-rated show on MSNBC on several occasions. After being on air for more than a month, Maddow's program doubled the audience that hour. This show made Maddow the first openly gay or lesbian host of a primetime news program in the United States.

The initial reviews for the show were positive. Los Angeles Times journalist Matea Gold wrote that Maddow "finds the right formula on MSNBC", and The Guardian wrote that Maddow had become the "star of America's cable news". Associated Press columnist David Bauder saw her as "[Keith] Olbermann's political soul mate", and he described the Olbermann-Maddow shows as a "liberal two-hour block".

Of her collegial relationship with Roger Ailes of Fox News, whom she sought out for technical advice, on camera angles, Maddow said she does not want to talk about it because "I don't want anybody else to use it. It was a nice thing that he did for me, and it's been valuable for me; it helped me get an advantage over my competitors."

In mid-May 2017, amid multiple controversies surrounding the Trump administration, MSNBC surpassed CNN and Fox News in the news ratings. For the week of May 15, The Rachel Maddow Show was the No. 1 non-sports program on cable for the first time. She has been called by Rolling Stone as "America's wonkiest anchor" who "cut through the chaos of the Trump administration – and became the most trusted name in the news." Maddow has argued that these issues "are the most serious scandals that any president has ever faced."

Maddow has stated that her show's mission is to "[i]ncrease the amount of useful information in the world". She said her rule for covering the Trump administration is: "Don't pay attention to what they say, focus on what they do ... because it's easier to cover a fast-moving story when you're not distracted by whatever the White House denials are."

Maddow often begins a broadcast with a lengthy story, sometimes longer than 20 minutes, which she has referred to on-air as the "A-block." This often begins with film clips and other media from events in past years or decades which she eventually connects with the news of the day. About this process, she has said: "The thing that defines whether or not you're good at this work is whether you have something to say when it's time to say something. Because you're going to have to say something when that light goes on ... I want to have something to say that people don't already know every single night, every single segment, and that makes it hard to get the process right because that's the only thing I care about."

Maddow was an outspoken advocate of vaccination during the COVID-19 pandemic, especially during 2021. She encouraged people to get vaccinated, for the benefit of themselves and others. She stated that COVID-19 vaccines “work well enough that the virus stops with every vaccinated person”, although CDC leaders later clarified that COVID-19 vaccines mainly reduced severe illness and death, not infection or transmission, especially as new variants appeared.

Maddow took a hiatus from her show from February to April 2022 to coincide with production on the film adaptation of Bag Man. As of May 2022, her show has moved to a weekly broadcast on Mondays.

On January 13, 2025, MSNBC announced that Maddow would temporarily return to hosting her show five-nights a week to cover the first 100 days of Donald Trump's second presidency. Maddow returned to hosting on Mondays only again beginning on May 5, 2025.

==== Herring Networks, Inc. v. Rachel Maddow, et al. ====
On September 10, 2019, the One America News Network (OAN) filed suit in the United States District Court for the Southern District of California against Maddow for $10 million, after Maddow described the network as "paid Russian propaganda" on her program on July 22. Maddow had repeated a Daily Beast story which identified an OAN employee as also working for Sputnik News, which is owned by the Russian government-owned news agency Rossiya Segodnya, and has been accused of deliberately disseminating disinformation, and is often described as an outlet for propaganda. Also named in the suit were Comcast, MSNBC, and NBCUniversal Media.

On May 22, 2020, the case was dismissed by Judge Cynthia Bashant, who found that "the contested statement is an opinion that cannot serve as the basis for a defamation". OAN parent company Herring Networks said they planned to appeal.

After considering Herring's appeal, in August 2021, the decision in favor of Maddow was affirmed by the United States Court of Appeal for the Ninth Circuit. The Court of Appeals also affirmed a trial court ruling that requires Herring to pay Maddow's attorneys' fees.

== Writing ==
Maddow wrote Drift: The Unmooring of American Military Power (2012) about the role of the military in postwar American politics. Upon its release, Drift reached the first position of The New York Times Best Seller list for hardcover nonfiction.

In December 2013, The Washington Post announced that Maddow would write a monthly opinion column for the paper, contributing one article per month over a period of six months.

On March 2, 2018, The New York Times published Maddow's first crossword puzzle, in collaboration with Joe DiPietro. On the eve of its publication, she said: "This is kind of it, like there will never be a baby, but there's this freaking crossword puzzle, and I am very, very excited about it."

Maddow's second book Blowout: Corrupted Democracy, Rogue State Russia, and the Richest, Most Destructive Industry on Earth was published in October 2019. In March 2021, the audiobook version of Blowout, recorded by Maddow, won the Grammy Award for Best Spoken Word Album at the 63rd Annual Grammy Awards.

Her third book, Bag Man: The Wild Crimes, Audacious Cover-up, and Spectacular Downfall of a Brazen Crook in the White House, written with Michael Yarvitz, about former U.S. vice president Spiro Agnew, was published in December 2020.

Maddow's fourth book, Prequel: An American Fight Against Fascism was published on October 17, 2023. It is based on her podcast Ultra.

Department of Fate: The Promise, the Power, and the Collapse of America’s Most Consequential Institution, Maddow's fifth book, was published November 10, 2026. The book documents the history of the United States Department of Justice, from the time it was created after the Civil War with intent of protecting civil rights, and how at various times in its history, it has been used for political purposes.

== Podcasting ==
In October 2018, Maddow launched the podcast Bag Man, produced with MSNBC and focusing on the 1973 political scandal surrounding Vice President Spiro Agnew. A film adaptation of the podcast was announced to be in production in 2022, with Ben Stiller attached to direct and Lorne Michaels to produce, with Maddow set to be an executive producer.

In October 2022, Maddow and MSNBC launched Ultra, a podcast series chronicling U.S. right-wing extremism during the 1940s and World War II, including the 1944 sedition trial. A few months later, in December, famed filmmaker Steven Spielberg's company optioned film rights to the series.

In December 2025, Maddow presented Burn Order, a podcast about the internment of Japanese Americans during World War II, and the subsequent cover-up by the United States government. It was the first she presented with the network since its rebrand to MS NOW.

== Public image and publicity ==
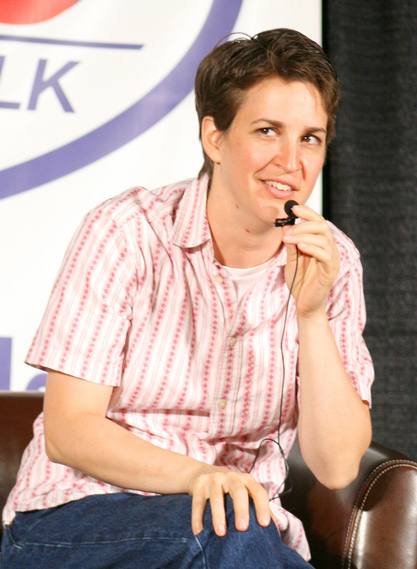
Maddow in 2008

A 2011 Hollywood Reporter profile of Maddow said she was able to deliver news "with agenda, but not hysteria". A Newsweek profile said, "At her best, Maddow debates ideological opponents with civility and persistence ... but for all her eloquence, she can get so wound up ripping Republicans that she sounds like another smug cable partisan". The Baltimore Sun critic Howard Kurtz accused Maddow of acting like "a lockstep party member". The editors of The New Republic similarly criticized her – naming her among the "most over-rated thinkers" of 2011, they called her program "a textbook example of the intellectual limitations of a perfectly settled perspective".

On awarding her the Interfaith Alliance's Faith and Freedom Award named for Walter Cronkite, Rev. Dr. C. Welton Gaddy remarked that "Rachel's passionate coverage of the intersection of religion and politics exhibits a strong personal intellect coupled with constitutional sensitivity to the proper boundaries between religion and government."

Similarly, a 2008 Time profile described Maddow a "whip-smart, button-cute leftie". It said she radiates an essential decency and suggested her career rise might signify that "nice is the new nasty".

Distinguishing herself from others on the left, Maddow has said she is a "national security liberal" and, in a different interview, that she is not "a partisan". The New York Times called her a "defense policy wonk".

== Political views ==
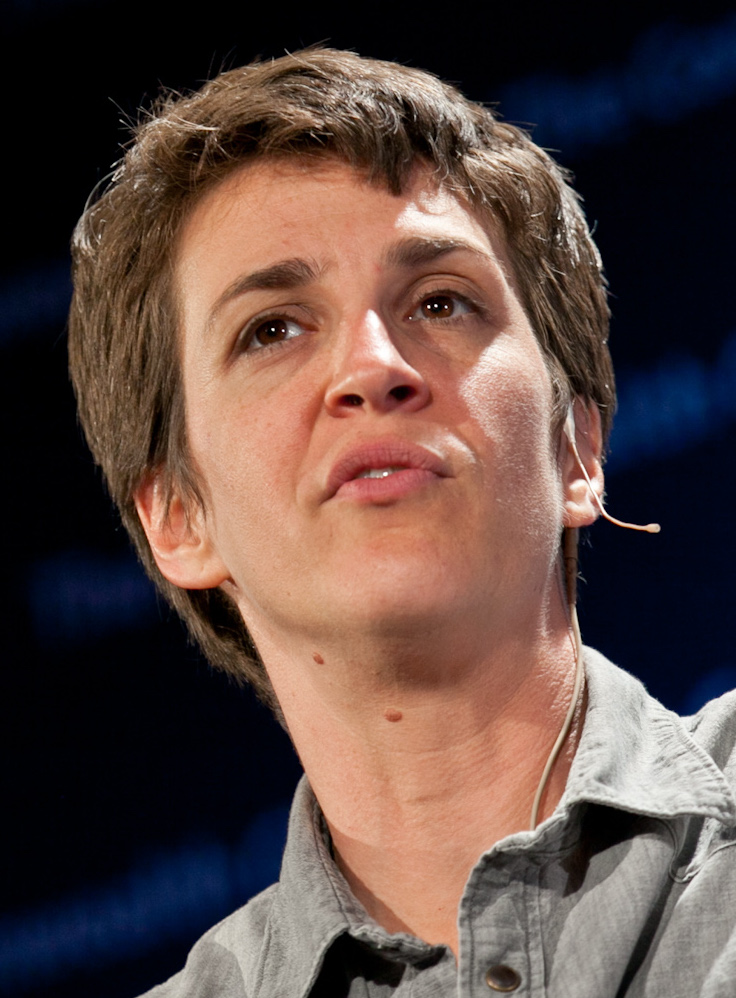
Maddow in 2012

When asked about her political views in 2010 by the Valley Advocate, Maddow replied, "I'm undoubtedly a liberal, which means that I'm in almost total agreement with the Eisenhower-era Republican Party platform."

Maddow opposed the 2003 invasion of Iraq. In February 2013, she said:

We say that Vietnam changed our politics forever. But less than 40 years after this, again, a campaign directed at the highest levels of government to get us to agree to a war based on something that did not happen the way they said it happened. It was a months-long campaign in 2002 and 2003, and it worked ... In three weeks, the CIA pulls together what normally takes months. It is delivered just seven days before the congressional vote ... By the end of 2002, the U.S. military is headed to the Gulf. Congress is on board, as are British Prime Minister Tony Blair and most of the mainstream media. The stage is set for war.

During the 2008 presidential election, Maddow did not formally support any candidate. Concerning Barack Obama's candidacy, Maddow said: "I have never and still don't think of myself as an Obama supporter, either professionally or actually."

In 2010, Republican Senator Scott Brown speculated that Maddow was going to run against him in the 2012 Senate election. His campaign used this premise for a fundraising email, although Maddow repeatedly said Brown's speculation was false. Brown continued to make his claims in the Boston media, so Maddow ran a full-page advertisement in The Boston Globe confirming that she was not running and separately demanded Brown's apology. She added that, despite repeated invitations over the months, Brown had refused to appear on her TV program. Ultimately, it was Elizabeth Warren who ran in 2012, defeating Brown.

Maddow has suggested that the alleged Trump-Russia collusion has continued beyond the 2016 presidential election. In March 2017, she blamed Russia for WikiLeaks' Vault 7 disclosure of the CIA's hacking tools, saying: "Consider what the other U.S. agency is besides the State Department that Putin most hates? That Putin most feels competitive with? That Putin most wants to beat? It's the CIA, right? ... Smart observers say this is the largest dump of classified CIA material maybe ever, and it really could be a devastating blow to the CIA's cyber war and flat-out spying capabilities, and that dump was released by WikiLeaks." Regarding the Trump-Russia investigation, Maddow said: "If the Trump presidency is knowingly the product of a foreign-intelligence operation, that is a full-stop national crisis." Concerning "alternative facts" and fake news, Maddow said: "The president denigrating the press is important in terms of his behavior as an increasingly authoritarian-style leader, period."

Following the October 2018 murder of Saudi Arabian dissident journalist and Washington Post columnist Jamal Khashoggi, Maddow argued that Donald Trump's business ties to Saudi Arabia were raising some troubling questions.

In December 2018, Maddow criticized President Trump's decision to withdraw U.S. troops from Syria.

In July 2020, Maddow predicted that unemployment figures covering the previous month would be "absolutely terrible"; after the figures were released, showing the largest growth in employment in a single month in U.S. history, Politico named Maddow's prediction one of "the most audacious, confident and spectacularly incorrect prognostications about the year".

In May 2021, former New York Times reporter Barry Meier published Spooked: The Trump Dossier, Black Cube, and the Rise of Private Spies, which cited the Steele dossier as a case study in how reporters can be manipulated by private intelligence sources. Meier named Maddow as one example.

Maddow has called for the impeachment of United States Attorney General Todd Blanche, identifying him as a paradigm example of being beholden to a President (Donald Trump) rather than following the Constitution and the Rule of Law on behalf of the American people. This followed from her research for her book about the history of the United States Department of Justice.

== Personal life ==
Maddow splits her time between Manhattan in New York City, and West Cummington, Massachusetts, with her partner, artist Susan Mikula. They met in 1999, when Maddow was working on her doctoral dissertation.

Maddow has dealt with cyclical depression since puberty. In a 2012 interview, she stated, "It doesn't take away from my joy or my work or my energy, but coping with depression is something that is part of the everyday way that I live and have lived for as long as I can remember." She has explained why she decided to speak about it in interviews: "It was a hard call ... Because it was nobody's business. But it had been helpful to me to learn about the people who were surviving, were leading good lives, even though they were dealing with depression. So I felt it was a bit of a responsibility to pay that back."

Maddow said, "There are three things I do to stay sane: I exercise, I sleep – I'm a good sleeper – and I fish." She is also a practicing Catholic.

In 2021, Maddow had surgery to remove a cancerous skin growth from her neck.

== Honors and awards ==
- 2023 Hillman Prize for Broadcast Journalism for her podcast, Ultra. “Since 1950, the Sidney Hillman Foundation has honored journalists who pursue investigative reporting and deep storytelling in service of the common good. Recipients exemplify reportorial excellence, storytelling skill, and social justice impact.” This was the first time the prize has gone to a podcast.
- 2020 Alfred I. duPont–Columbia University Award for her podcast, Bagman. The award “honors excellence in broadcast and digital journalism in the public service and is considered one of the most prestigious awards in journalism.” It's "considered by some to be the broadcast equivalent of the Pulitzer Prize, another program administered by Columbia University."
- 2018 Peabody Award nomination for her podcast, Bagman (“In-depth investigation and historic look by Rachel Maddow and Mike Yarvitz at the forced resignation of Vice President Spiro T. Agnew, the brash politician who waged an all-out assault on the public officials who uncovered his criminal past and those who reported on it.”)
- 2017 Emmy Award in the Outstanding Live Interview category for The Rachel Maddow Show segment "One-on-One with Kellyanne Conway".
- 2017 Emmy Award in the Outstanding News Discussion & Analysis category for The Rachel Maddow Show story "An American Disaster: The Crisis in Flint".
- 2011 Emmy Award in the Outstanding News Discussion & Analysis category for The Rachel Maddow Show segments "Good Morning Landlocked Central Asia!".
- Maddow was named in Out magazine's "Out 100" list of the "gay men and women who moved culture" in 2008.
- Maddow was voted "Lesbian/Bi Woman of the Year (American)" in AfterEllen's 2008 Visibility Awards.
- Maddow won a Gracie Award in 2009, presented by the American Women in Radio and Television.
- In 2009, Maddow was nominated for GLAAD's 20th Annual Media Awards for a segment of her MSNBC show, "Rick Warren, Change To Believe In?", in the Outstanding TV Journalism Segment category.
- On March 28, 2009, Maddow received a Proclamation of Honor from the California State Senate, presented in San Francisco by California State Senator Mark Leno.
- In April 2009, she was listed at No. 4 in Out magazine's Annual Power 50 List.
- Maddow placed sixth in the "2009 AfterEllen.com Hot 100" list (May 11, 2009) and third in its "2009 Hot 100: Out Women" version.
- Maddow was included on a list of openly gay media professionals in The Advocate's "Forty under 40" issue of June/July 2009.
- In 1994, Maddow received an Honorable Mention in the Elie Wiesel Foundation for Humanity Prize in Ethics.
- In June 2009, Maddow's MSNBC show was the only cable news show nominated for a Television Critics Association award in the Outstanding Achievement in News and Information category.
- In March 2010, Maddow won at the 21st Annual GLAAD Media Awards in the category of Outstanding TV Journalism – Newsmagazine for her segment, "Uganda Be Kidding Me".
- In May 2010, Maddow was the 2010 commencement speaker and was given an honorary Doctor of Laws (LLD) degree at Smith College in Northampton, Massachusetts.
- In July 2010, Maddow was presented with a Maggie Award for her ongoing reporting of healthcare reform, the murder of Dr. George Tiller, and the anti-abortion movement.
- In August 2010, Maddow won the Walter Cronkite Faith & Freedom Award, which was presented by the Interfaith Alliance. Past honorees included Larry King, Tom Brokaw, and the late Peter Jennings.
- In February 2012, Maddow was presented the John Steinbeck Award by the Martha Heasley Cox Center for Steinbeck Studies at San Jose State University.
- Maddow was named Outstanding Host at the 2012 Gracie Allen Awards
- In December 2017 The Advocate named her as a finalist for its "Person of the Year".
- In 2021, Fast Company included her on their second Queer 50 list.
- In late 2024, Maddow was named one of America's 10 best TV news journalists by GALECA: The Society of LGBTQ Entertainment Critics. The organization, purveyors of the Dorian Awards to mainstream and LGBTQ-themed content, said its "members clearly appreciate how Maddow lays out information and exposes disinformation in her fights against kleptocracy and fascism."

=== Grammy Awards ===
Year	Award	Nominated work	Result	Ref.
2013	Best Spoken Word Album	Drift	Nominated	
2021	Best Spoken Word Album	Blowout	Won	

=== Scholastic ===
University degrees

Location	Date	School	Degree
California	1994	Stanford University	Bachelor of Arts (BA) in Public Policy
England	2001	Lincoln College, Oxford	Doctor of Philosophy (D.Phil.) in Politics

Chancellor, visitor, governor, rector and fellowships

Location	Date	School	Position
California	1994–1995	John Gardner Fellowship from Stanford University	Fellow

=== Honorary degrees ===
Honorary degrees

Location	Date	School	Degree	Gave Commencement Address
Massachusetts	May 2010	Smith College	Doctor of Laws (LL.D)	Yes

=== Other honors ===
Location	Date	Institution	Award
California	February 2012	San Jose State University	John Steinbeck Award
New York	2012	Alliance for Women in Media	Gracie Allen Award for Outstanding Host

== In popular culture ==
Tracey Ullman played Maddow in her Showtime comedy series Tracey Ullman's State of the Union. Maddow invited Ullman on her show and interviewed her in January 2010.

Abby Elliott and Melissa Villasenor have both played Maddow in sketches on Saturday Night Live.

Maddow appeared as a character on the November 3, 2013 episode of The Simpsons, "Four Regrettings and a Funeral".

Maddow appeared at the start of "Trump: The Rusical" on RuPaul's Drag Race season 11 as the star of a mini-challenge where the contestants had to dress up as Maddow and read from a teleprompter.

Maddow is the voice of Vesper Fairchild in the television series Batwoman. In March 2010 she wrote the introduction to the Batwoman: Elegy trade paperback, in which she noted her appreciation for the work of writer Greg Rucka. She appeared as herself on the Netflix series House of Cards.

Maddow also makes a cameo as herself in the 2023 romance film Red, White & Royal Blue.

== Works ==
- Maddow, Rachel (2012). Drift: The Unmooring of American Military Power. Crown. ISBN 978-0-307-46098-1.
- Maddow, Rachel (2019). Blowout: Corrupted Democracy, Rogue State Russia, and the Richest, Most Destructive Industry on Earth. Crown. ISBN 978-0-525-57547-4.
- Maddow, Rachel; Yarvitz, Michael (2020). Bag Man: The Wild Crimes, Audacious Cover-up, and Spectacular Downfall of a Brazen Crook in the White House. Crown. ISBN 9780593136683.
- Maddow, Rachel (2023). Prequel: An American Fight Against Fascism. Crown. ISBN 9780593444511.
- Maddow, Rachel (2026). Department of Fate: The Promise, the Power, and the Collapse of America's Most Consequential Institution. New York: Crown. ISBN 978-0-593-44454-2.

== See also ==
- LGBT culture in New York City
- List of LGBT people from New York City
- New Yorkers in journalism
- United States cable news
- Women's liberation movement
