= Blowout (book) =

2019 non-fiction book by Rachel Maddow

Blowout: Corrupted Democracy, Rogue State Russia, and the Richest, Most Destructive Industry on Earth
- First edition cover
- Author: Rachel Maddow
- Audio read by: Rachel Maddow
- Language: English
- Subjects: Oil and gas industry; Russian interference in the 2016 United States elections
- Publisher: Crown
- Publication date: October 1, 2019
- Publication place: United States
- Media type: Print (hardcover and paperback)
- Pages: 432
- ISBN: 978-0-525-57547-4 (hardcover)
- Dewey Decimal: 338.2/7285
- LC Class: HD9581.A2 M33 2019

Blowout: Corrupted Democracy, Rogue State Russia, and the Richest, Most Destructive Industry on Earth is a 2019 non-fiction book by Rachel Maddow. It is her second book and was published by Crown on October 1, 2019. It concerns corruption in the oil and gas industry and the Russian interference in the 2016 United States elections.

The book debuted at number one on The New York Times Best Seller list. The audiobook edition was awarded Best Spoken Word Album at the 63rd Annual Grammy Awards.

== Publication ==
Blowout was first published in hardcover by Crown, an imprint of Random House, on October 1, 2019. The book was also published in paperback on October 15, 2019, by Random House Large Print.

The book debuted at number one on The New York Times' Combined Print & E-Book Nonfiction best sellers list and Hardcover Nonfiction best sellers list for the October 20, 2019 issue of The New York Times Book Review.

== Reception ==
Kirkus Reviews praised the book, calling it a "densely argued exercise in connecting dots".

Publishers Weekly gave the book a mixed review, writing, "the resulting hodgepodge doesn't always support her portrayal of oil and gas as a 'singularly destructive industry' that 'effectively owns' governments; her absorbing account of Putin's skullduggery is really about a vampiric government victimizing the oil industry (and includes an unconvincing link to Trump-Russia collusion theories). Maddow's absorbing but inconsistent exposé demonizes more than it analyzes."

Writing for The New York Times Book Review, journalist Fareed Zakaria gave the book a mixed review, praising its examination of the fossil fuel industry but criticizing it for not being "radical in its conclusions" and not providing "a path out of the darkness".

Carol Haggas of Booklist gave the book a rave review, writing, "Maddow brings her laser-like intuitiveness and keen and wily perception to Big Oil, that stalwart of global economics, and the shadowy nexus of commerce and politics".

Jill Dougherty, writing for The Washington Post, gave the book an unfavorable review, writing that it "reads like Maddow's MSNBC monologues, piling outrage on top of outrage, peppered with breathless asides warning of Armageddon".

David M. Shribman of The Boston Globe gave the book a positive review, writing, "Maddow builds a case of cross-cultural corruption that is marred only by the occasional informality of her prose and her sometimes-distracting wise-guy rhetoric."

In March 2021, the audiobook version of Blowout, recorded by Maddow, won the Grammy Award for Best Spoken Word Album at the 63rd Annual Grammy Awards (beating out recordings by Red Hot Chili Peppers bassist Flea, Ronan Farrow. Ken Jennings, and Meryl Streep).

== See also ==
- Business projects of Donald Trump in Russia
- Links between Trump associates and Russian officials
