= Susan Mikula =

American artist and photographer (born 1958)

- Born: 1958 (age 67–68); New Jersey, U.S.
- Education: Hampshire College
- Known for: Photography
- Partner: Rachel Maddow (1999–present)
- Website: susanmikula.com

Susan Mikula (born 1958) is an American artist and photographer. After years working in the art industry and serving on an art jury, Mikula had her first solo photography exhibition in 1998. She uses older technology to produce her photographs, including pinhole cameras and Polaroid cameras. Mikula is the longtime partner of political commentator Rachel Maddow.

== Early life and education ==
Mikula was born in New Jersey in 1958, before relocating to New Hampshire at a young age. She taught herself photography at an early age. She attended Hampshire College in Amherst, Massachusetts.

== Career ==
Mikula spent several years in the art industry, including a stint on an art jury. In 1998, she landed her first solo exhibition. Her published landscape photography collections have been displayed in both solo and group exhibitions in New York City, Miami, San Francisco, and Los Angeles. Mikula exhibited "large-scale digital Duraflex prints" at the New York State House in 2007. In 2008, she opened her first show in New York. Mikula had an exhibition in 2009 at the TJ Walton Gallery in Provincetown with Rachel Maddow and Suzanne Westenhoefer attending. In 2010, Mikula had her first photography show, American Device Recent Photographs, in San Francisco. A year later, Mikula released a three part industrial landscape series titled American Bond. These American vistas spanned images of America from Texas to California to Massachusetts. Her 2013 series, u.X, were inspired by the Lascaux cave paintings.

In 2015, Mikula released a series of psychologically enigmatic pigment prints titled Photo Book. Mikula's more Pittsfield focused photograph galleries were also on display at the Ferrin Gallery. Since 2017, Mikula has been a part of the Art in Embassies program for United States Consulate in Nuevo Laredo, Mexico, doing site specific works for the organization. Some of Mikula's works were purchased by the United States Embassy Art in Embassies (Nuevo Laredo Mexico) for their Permanent Collections.

== Artistry ==
=== Style ===
Mikula is interested in the movement of light and time. She uses older technology to produce her photographs. Among her tools are pinhole cameras and Polaroid cameras.

=== Influences ===
Mikula finds inspiration from painters. In an interview with The Advocate, she listed the following artists specifically: Julian Schnabel, Joan Mitchell, Cy Twombly, Gerhard Richter, Agnes Martin. Some of her local influences include Maggie Mailer, Charlie Hunter, TJ Walton, and Ward Schumaker.

== Personal life ==
Mikula is lesbian, she is also the longtime partner of MSNBC commentator Rachel Maddow. They met in 1999 while Maddow was working on her doctoral dissertation. Mikula hired Maddow to work on her yard and they went on to date. Their first date was at the "Ladies Day on the Range" event hosted by the National Rifle Association of America. They reside in a pre-Civil War farmhouse in Western Massachusetts and an apartment in the West Village, Manhattan.

In November 2020, Rachel Maddow revealed that Mikula had COVID-19, and subsequently recovered.

Mikula's sister is a medical photographer in Boston.

== Bibliography ==
- Mikula, Susan (2008). Susan Mikula: Photographs. Luxxus Press.
- Mikula, Susan (2011). Susan Mikula: American Bond. George Lawson Art Gallery. ISBN 9781450791168. OCLC 793125803.
- Mikula, Susan (2013). Susan Mikula: u.X. George Lawson Gallery. OCLC 971505175.
- Mikula, Susan (2017). Susan Mikula: Kilo.

== See also ==
- LGBT culture in New York City
- List of LGBT people from New York City
