= Drift: The Unmooring of American Military Power =

2012 book by Rachel Maddow

- First edition
- Author: Rachel Maddow
- Language: English
- Subject: Declaration of war by the United States
- Publisher: Crown Publishing Group
- Publication date: March 27, 2012
- Publication place: United States
- Media type: Hardcover
- Pages: 288
- ISBN: 978-0-307-46098-1 (hardcover); ISBN 978-0-307-46099-8 (paperback)
- OCLC: 765967335

Drift: The Unmooring of American Military Power is a 2012 book by Rachel Maddow. Her first book, Drift explores the premise that the manner in which the United States goes to war has gradually become more secretive and less democratic. In Drift, Maddow examines how American declarations of war have incrementally shifted from being congressionally approved to being centralized in the hands of the American president. The book's scope spans from the Vietnam War to the wars in Iraq and Afghanistan.

Maddow has said that she wrote Drift because the topic deserved a long-form format that could not be adequately addressed in her television program. The book is dedicated to former Vice President Dick Cheney because he was on her "wish list" for her to interview.

== Overview ==
Drift opens with an analysis of the politics surrounding the Vietnam War, focusing on the Abrams Doctrine, which stressed public support for military operations. Maddow writes that Lyndon B. Johnson's reluctance to utilize the National Guard and the Army Reserve began the trend of separating the military and its use from the purview of the American population. She discusses the 1973 War Powers Resolution and the evolving role of the American President in military conflicts. After elaborating on the Reagan administration's role in the Invasion of Grenada and the Iran–Contra affair, Drift gives credit to George H. W. Bush for seeking Congressional approval for Operation Desert Storm. Maddow is critical of the use of private contractors and intelligence agencies in warfare. She writes about the American incursion into Pakistan to kill Osama bin Laden and makes the point that land set aside for houbara bustard hunting gave reason for both Pakistan and the United States to excuse the existence of a secret base that originated drone attacks.

== Chapters ==
Prologue: Is It Too Late to Descope This?

1. G.I. Joe, Ho Chi Minh, and the American Art of Fighting about Fighting
2. A Nation at Peace Everywhere in the World
3. Let 'Er Fly
4. Isle of Spice
5. Stupid Regulations
6. Mylanta, 'Tis of Thee
7. Doing More with Less (Hassle)
8. "One Hell of a Killing Machine"
9. An $8 Trillion Fungus Among Us

Epilogue: You Build It, You Own It

== Critical reception ==
Drift's back cover includes blurbs from Naomi Klein, Matt Taibbi, Tom Brokaw, and Fox News CEO Roger Ailes. Ailes wrote a positive review, saying "People who like Rachel will love the book. People who don’t will get angry, but aggressive debate is good for America. Drift is a book worth reading."

Slate's Emily Bazelon writes that Maddow "takes her readers on a biting, bracing tour of the rise of American military bloat. Maddow wants us to confront the size and heft of the national security complex we’ve built, and also to understand how its gargantuan growth is tied to the wolfish executive branch’s usurpation of the sheeplike legislature’s war-making powers."

Drift was praised by Scott Shane in a review published in The New York Times' Sunday Book Review. He called it "a thought-provoking and timely book" but added that "her narrative is so beguiling that a reader may overlook its weaknesses", suggesting that the congressional approval for the wars in Afghanistan and Iraq undermined Maddow's argument that the executive branch had become overweening.

Gordon M. Goldstein, reviewing Drift along with War Time: An Idea, Its History, Its Consequences by Mary L. Dudziak in The Washington Post, complimented Maddow's "robust and eclectic research" but criticises her analysis of the 1991 invasion of Iraq, calling her narrative "too narrow", and NATO intervention in the Balkans in 1995, saying "her account is far too truncated". However, he notes that "Maddow’s distinctive voice in Drift is highly intelligent, often incredulous and intermittently and humorously profane," adding that she is "gifted at and deeply practiced in the art of public policy debate". He summarizes that although reasonable criticisms can be made of Maddow's argument "these...do little to dilute the overall force of her thesis, which is passionately and effectively articulated."

Drift debuted at the top of The New York Times Best Sellers list for hardcover nonfiction, where it remained at number one for five weeks and remained in the top 10 for an additional two weeks.

== See also ==
- Perpetual war
