= Bill Barich =

American writer (born 1943)

Bill Barich (born 1943 in Winona, Minnesota) is an American writer.

== Biography ==
Barich grew up on Long Island and graduated from Colgate University in 1965. Subsequently, he served in the U.S. Peace Corps in eastern Nigeria (Biafra), then settled in northern California where many of his books are set.

He published Laughing in the Hills, his first book, a classic account of racetrack life, in 1980. William Shawn, editor of The New Yorker, ran a two-part excerpt from the book and appointed Barich a staff writer. His contributions over the next fifteen years fall into three categories: travel and the sporting life; reportage; and short fiction. Traveling Light, his account of a sojourn abroad in Italy and England, appeared in 1984, after which he won a Guggenheim Fellowship in Fiction. His other books include Hard to Be Good (stories); Big Dreams: Into the Heart of California (travel); Carson Valley (novel); Crazy for Rivers (angling/autobiography); and A Fine Place to Daydream (travel/racing). Barich's work has been included in Best American Short Stories and many other anthologies.

In addition to The New Yorker, he has contributed to Esquire, Sports Illustrated, American Poetry Review, Salon, Narrative, and other magazines and journals, and he is a Literary Laureate of the San Francisco Public Library. He traveled between Santa Monica, California and Dublin, Ireland. He has also written a book entitled A Pint of Plain, an account of his setting out to find a traditional authentic Irish pub. It is a lament of sorts as he is seeking the famous Pat Cohan-type pub of the John Wayne film The Quiet Man. In 2010, Barich published Long Way Home: On the Trail of Steinbeck's America his account of a 5,943-mile cross-country trip undertaken in the autumn of 2008 just prior to the presidential election. He assesses the state of the nation in much the same way John Steinbeck did almost fifty years ago in Travels With Charley. From 2010 through 2012 he worked as the lead writer on the HBO series Luck, about horses and racing, created by David Milch and starring Dustin Hoffman and Nick Nolte. In 2016, Barich published An Angle on the World, a collection of reporting from The New Yorker, travel pieces, personal essays, and book reviews.

== Bibliography ==
- Laughing in the Hills (1980)
- Traveling Light (1984)
- Hard to Be Good (1987)
- Big Dreams: Into the Heart of California (1994)
- Carson Valley (1997)
- Crazy for Rivers (1999)
- The Sporting Life (1999)
- A Fine Place to Daydream (2006)
- A Pint of Plain (2009)
- Long Way Home: On the Trail of Steinbeck's America (2010)
- An Angle on the World (2016)
