= Prequel: An American Fight Against Fascism =

2023 book by Rachel Maddow

- Authors: Rachel Maddow
- Language: English
- Publisher: Crown
- Publication date: October 17, 2023
- Pages: 416
- ISBN: 978-0-5934-4451-1
- Preceded by: Bag Man: The Wild Crimes, Audacious Cover-up, and Spectacular Downfall of a Brazen Crook in the White House

Prequel: An American Fight Against Fascism is a 2023 book by Rachel Maddow about fascist sympathizers in 1930s America. The book, which was inspired by her research for her podcast Ultra, includes the Silver Legion of America, the American White Guard, the Christian Front, and the propaganda operation of George Viereck.
