= Department of Fate =

Book by Rachel Maddow

- Author: Rachel Maddow
- Cover artist: Brian Stauffer
- Subject: History
- Genre: Non-fiction
- Publisher: Crown Publishing
- Publication date: November 10, 2026
- Publication place: New York
- Media type: Hardcover
- Pages: 425
- ISBN: 978-0-593-44454-2
- LC Class: KF5107 .M33 2026

Department of Fate: The Promise, the Power, and the Collapse of America’s Most Consequential Institution is a book by American television host and political commentator Rachel Maddow. It's Maddow's fifth book, published November 10, 2026.

The book chronicles the history of the United States Department of Justice.
