= John Steigerwald =

Sports Journalist

- Born: October 3, 1948 (age 77); Pittsburgh, Pennsylvania
- Occupations: Sportscaster, Sports anchor, Sports reporter
- Spouse: Jeani
- Relatives: Paul Steigerwald (brother); Bill Steigerwald (brother); Danny Stag (brother); Lucy Steigerwald (niece)

John Steigerwald (born October 3, 1948) is a Pittsburgh-based sports reporter, commentator, and former sports anchor and second oldest member of the Steigerwald media family that includes his older brother Bill and younger brothers Paul Steigerwald and rock guitarist Dan Steigerwald. John worked on the sports anchor team at WTAE-TV (ABC), along with other Pittsburgh notables such as Myron Cope and Bill Hillgrove. He later moved to KDKA-TV (CBS) in 1985 and was an anchor and primary Pittsburgh Steelers reporter for 30 years. KDKA chose not to renew his contract in 2007. Until 2015 he was a "Sports Talk" host on the radio website of the Pittsburgh Tribune-Review. He writes a weekly column for The Daily Caller and his web site is JustWatchtheGame.com. John's brother Bill Steigerwald is an ex-newspaperman and book author ("30 Days a Black Man" and "Dogging Steinbeck") who worked at the Los Angeles Times in the 1980s, the Pittsburgh Post-Gazette in the 1990s and the Pittsburgh Tribune-Review in the 2000s. Paul Steigerwald, also a former KDKA-TV sports reporter, held the position of Pittsburgh Penguins' television play-by-play announcer from 2006 until 2017.

== Bryan Stow incident ==
Steigerwald, whose opinionated and often politically incorrect weekly sports column has run in Pittsburgh daily newspapers for 25 years, was the focus of much controversy in 2011 after San Francisco Giants fan Bryan Stow was severely beaten on Opening Day at Dodger Stadium in Los Angeles. In his column for the Washington Observer-Reporter Steigerwald wrote: "Maybe somebody can ask Stow, if he ever comes out of his coma, why he thought it was a good idea to wear Giants gear to a Dodgers’ home opener when there was a history of out-of-control drunkenness and arrests at that event going back several years." Steigerwald, who had commented many times in his column that adult fans should "grow up" and not wear replica jerseys to their teams' games, was accused by sports bloggers around the country of blaming Stow for the incident. He defended himself vigorously on national TV and in print, arguing that blog headlines like “Jerk in Pennsylvania says Giants Fan Deserved It” and “Pennsylvania Columnist Says Stow had it Coming” completely misrepresented what he wrote. He later admitted that his comments about Stow's beating "came across as flippant and insensitive" but wrote "That was not my intent. If I had it to do over again, I would write it differently. I know what I felt in my heart when I wrote it and it was anger over what had happened to this guy over a stupid jersey."

== Books ==
Steigerwald is also a published author. His two books about growing up and covering sports in Pittsburgh, Just Watch the Game (2010) and Just Watch the Game Again (2011), were edited, updated, and combined into the ebook "Just Watch the Game" (2014).
