= Susan Shillinglaw =

American Steinbeck scholar and professor

Susan Grace Shillinglaw is an American literary scholar and Professor Emerita of English and Comparative Literature at San José State University (SJSU), where she taught for thirty-eight years. She is known for her work on John Steinbeck, having served as Director of the Martha Heasley Cox Center for Steinbeck Studies and as Scholar-in-Residence and Director of the National Steinbeck Center in Salinas, California.

== Early life and education ==
Shillinglaw was born in New Hampton, Iowa and raised in Englewood, Colorado. She earned her B.A. in Art and English from Cornell College in 1973, followed by an M.A. (1976) and Ph.D. in American Literature (1985) from the University of North Carolina at Chapel Hill.

== Academic career ==
Shillinglaw began teaching at Wake Forest University (1977–1981), followed by positions at Canisius College and the Buffalo Seminary in New York (1981–1984). She joined San José State University in 1984, where she remained on the English and Comparative Literature faculty until her retirement in 2021.

At SJSU, she served as Director of the Martha Heasley Cox Center for Steinbeck Studies from 1987 to 2005. From 2005 onward, she was Scholar-in-Residence and later Director (2015–2018) of the National Steinbeck Center.

She has also been a Visiting Professor at Stanford University’s Hopkins Marine Station, co-teaching the interdisciplinary course Holistic Biology with marine biologist William Gilly between 2005 and 2012; as a visiting professor, she continues to teach with Professor Gilly at Hopkins. Since 2012, she has lectured regularly for the Osher Lifelong Learning Institute (OLLI) at CSU Monterey Bay.

Shillinglaw has co-directed seven National Endowment for the Humanities (NEH) summer institutes for schoolteachers on Steinbeck's work, “John Steinbeck, The Voice of a Region, A Voice for America.

She is also a volunteer docent at Robinson Jeffers's Tor House and a member of the board of the Tor House Foundation.

== Research and scholarship ==
Shillinglaw's research examines Steinbeck's engagement with ecology, politics, gender, and place. Her scholarship examines the ways in which Steinbeck's fiction brings together scientific inquiry, spiritual reflection, and social conscience. She has published on Steinbeck's relationships with his first wife, Carol Henning Steinbeck, and with his close friend, Edward F. Ricketts.

Her major books include; On Reading The Grapes of Wrath, Carol and John Steinbeck: Portrait of a Marriage, A Journey into Steinbeck's California and Steinbeck's Landscapes combine close reading, archival research, and cultural history to show how place, friendship (especially Steinbeck's relationship with Edward F. Ricketts), and politics shaped Steinbeck's writing.

She has also co-edited interdisciplinary volumes such as Steinbeck and the Environment and Beyond Boundaries: Rereading John Steinbeck, and prepared introductions and critical editions for Penguin Classics (e.g., Cannery Row, Of Mice and Men, A Russian Journal, The Winter of Our Discontent).

== Selected bibliography ==
=== Books ===
- HEAVILIN, BARBARA A.; SHILLINGLAW, SUSAN, eds. (2024-12-17). Steinbeck's Uneasy America. University of Alabama Press. doi:10.2307/jj.30347749. ISBN 978-0-8173-9539-1.
- Shillinglaw, Susan (2014). On reading the Grapes of Wrath. New York: Penguin Books. ISBN 978-0-14-312550-1.
- Shillinglaw, Susan (2013). Carol & John Steinbeck: portrait of a marriage. Western literature series. Reno: University of Nevada press. ISBN 978-0-87417-930-9.
- Shillinglaw, Susan; Burnett, Nancy (2019). A journey into Steinbeck's California. ArtPlace series (3RD ed.). Berkeley, California: Roaring Forties Press. ISBN 978-1-938901-83-6.
- Steinbeck, John (2003). America and Americans and Selected Nonfiction. Susan Shillinglaw, Jackson J. Benson. East Rutherford: Penguin Publishing Group. ISBN 978-0-14-243741-4.
- Shillinglaw, Susan; Hearle, Kevin, eds. (2002). Beyond boundaries: rereading John Steinbeck. Tuscaloosa: University of Alabama Press. ISBN 978-0-8173-1151-3.
- Steinbeck and the Environment: Interdisciplinary Approaches. University of Alabama Press. 1997. doi:10.2307/jj.30347489. ISBN 978-0-8173-0846-9.
- McElrath, Joseph R., ed. (1996). John Steinbeck: the contemporary reviews. American critical archives. Cambridge: Cambridge University Press. ISBN 978-0-521-41038-0.
- Steinbeck, John (1994). Of mice and men. Penguin Twentieth-Century Classics. New York, NY: Penguin Books. ISBN 978-0-14-018642-0.

=== Articles and essays ===
- Shillinglaw, Susan (2024-06-03). "Restoring the Western Flyer , Plank by Plank". Steinbeck Review. 21 (1): 104–120. doi:10.5325/steinbeckreview.21.1.0104. ISSN 1546-007X.
- Shillinglaw, Susan (2020). "Reconsidering the Steinbeck-Ricketts Bond: Restored Western Flyer Sails Again in 2021". Steinbeck Review. 17 (2): 202–213. doi:10.5325/steinbeckreview.17.2.0202. ISSN 1938-6214.
- Shillinglaw, Susan (2019). "John Steinbeck's Participatory Politics, 1936–1968". Steinbeck Review. 16 (2): 145–155. doi:10.5325/steinbeckreview.16.2.0145. ISSN 1546-007X.
- Shillinglaw, Susan (2020). "To Look from Heliaster to the Stars and then Back to the Tide Pool". Journal of the Southwest. 62 (2): 450–466. doi:10.1353/jsw.2020.0012. ISSN 2158-1371.
- Shillinglaw, Susan; Pham, Melinda; Martin, TK; Barraza, Pete (2015). "Teaching and Living Steinbeck's Stories". Steinbeck Review. 12 (1): 1–15. doi:10.5325/steinbeckreview.12.1.0001. ISSN 1546-007X.
- Shillinglaw, Susan (2015-05-19), "The Protest Fiction of Frank Norris, Upton Sinclair, Jack London, and John Steinbeck", A History of California Literature, Cambridge University Press, pp. 157–170, doi:10.1017/cbo9781107280359.011, ISBN 978-1-107-28035-9
