= America and Americans =

First edition (publ. Heinemann)

America and Americans is a 1966 collection of John Steinbeck's journalism. It was Steinbeck's last book.
