= Bill Steigerwald =

American author and journalist

Bill Steigerwald is a Pittsburgh-born author and journalist who worked as an editor and writer/reporter/columnist for the Los Angeles Times in the 1980s, the Pittsburgh Post-Gazette in the 1990s and the Pittsburgh Tribune-Review in the 2000s. Hundreds of his Q&A interviews and libertarian op-ed columns written for the Pittsburgh Trib were nationally syndicated in the 2000s by CagleCartoons.com. His free-lance articles, op-ed columns and commentaries have appeared in major newspapers in the US and in magazines like Reason. In 2009 he retired from daily newspaper work to focus on writing books. Many of his feature articles, op-ed pieces and newspaper Q&As with celebrities, politicians and authors are archived with recent writings at Clips & Q&As: The Steigerwald Post.

His self-published Dogging Steinbeck: Discovering America and Exposing The Truth About Travels with Charley, carefully retraced the 10,000-mile road trip around the USA that author John Steinbeck made in 1960 for his nonfiction classic Travels with Charley. Steigerwald's research in libraries and on his own 11,276-mile road trip in 2010 proved that Steinbeck and his editors at The Viking Press had significantly fictionalized the account of his iconic journey.

Steigerwald's 2017 history book 30 Days a Black Man tells the forgotten story of Pittsburgh Post-Gazette reporter Ray Sprigle's undercover mission into the Jim Crow South in 1948. Born in 1947, Bill Steigerwald is the oldest member of the Pittsburgh multimedia family that includes his TV sports brothers John Steigerwald (formerly of KDKA-TV) and Paul Steigerwald (former radio and TV play-by-play announcer of the Pittsburgh Penguins) and Dan Steigerwald (aka, Danny Stag, lead guitarist for the hard-rock band Kingdom Come). Bill currently lives in Bethany, WV.
