= National Steinbeck Center =

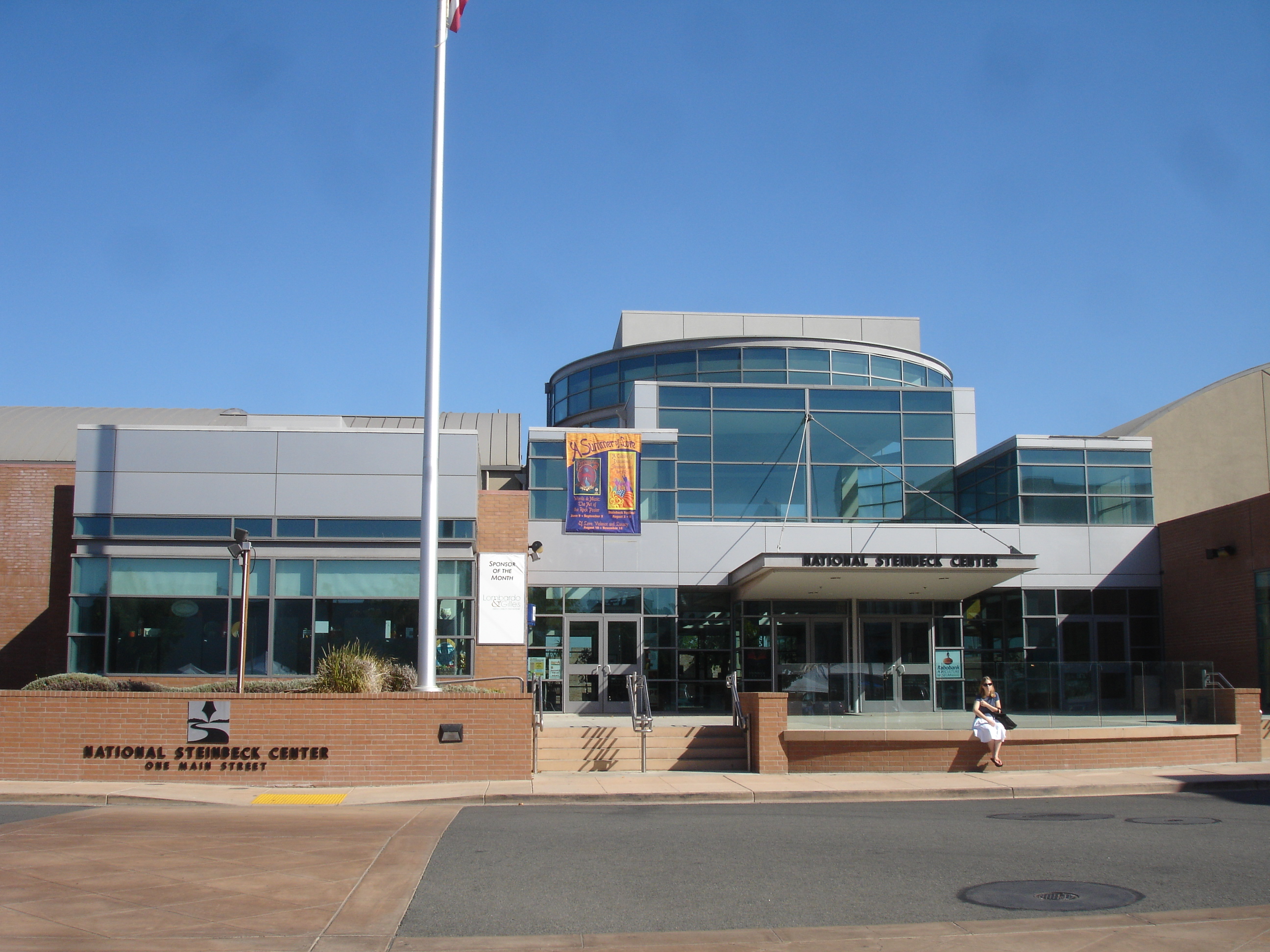
- Established: 1998
- Location: One Main Street; Salinas, California
- Coordinates: 36.6771°N 121.6555°W
- Type: Biographical museum
- Collections: Manuscripts, correspondences, family library, foreign editions, works, historical interviews and oral histories, critical analysis, ephemera, artifacts
- Director: Susan Shillinglaw
- Parking: Monterey Street parking garage
- Website: www.steinbeck.org

The National Steinbeck Center is a museum and memorial dedicated to the author John Steinbeck, located at the California State University, Monterey Bay at Salinas City Center building at One Main Street in Salinas, California, the town where Steinbeck grew up.

The Steinbeck Center Foundation was founded in 1983; the center itself was finished and opened to the public on June 27, 1998. The center houses the largest collection of Steinbeck archives in the United States, with various exhibits on his body of work and philosophy. The center recently renovated a small exhibit for rotating exhibits within the main exhibit hall.

The Steinbeck Center is a focal point for activities which encourage learning about literature, human nature, history, agriculture, and the arts. Many educational programs are provided for the public, students and teachers, a multimedia experience for regional and national audiences.

The John Steinbeck House, Steinbeck's childhood home, is located near the museum.

== Mission ==
"Drawing from the works of John Steinbeck, the National Steinbeck Center is dedicated to Steinbeck’s creative legacy: to participate, to inspire, to educate, and to understand one another."

== Building ==
The building at 1 Main Street in Salinas, California contains an orientation theater, a 2,000 sq. foot exhibit dedicated to the life and works of John Steinbeck, and a Museum Store.

The building was planned, funded, and eventually erected from 1996 to June, 1998. Entities involved the design and constructions are Brian Kelly, Login, Inc. Williamson-McCarter & Associates, Kasavan Architects, Thompson Vaivoda & Associates, Lee & Associates, Fehr Engineers, H.A. Ekelin Construction Manager, Formations, Inc. Exhibition Design Firm, and Central Coast Engineers.

In 2016, the National Steinbeck Center and California State Monterey Bay completed negotiations for CSUMB to purchase the building. Renovations are continuing on the building, known as CSUMB @ Salinas City Center. The National Steinbeck Center continues to function as a non-profit organization that manages the Museum and affiliated programs.

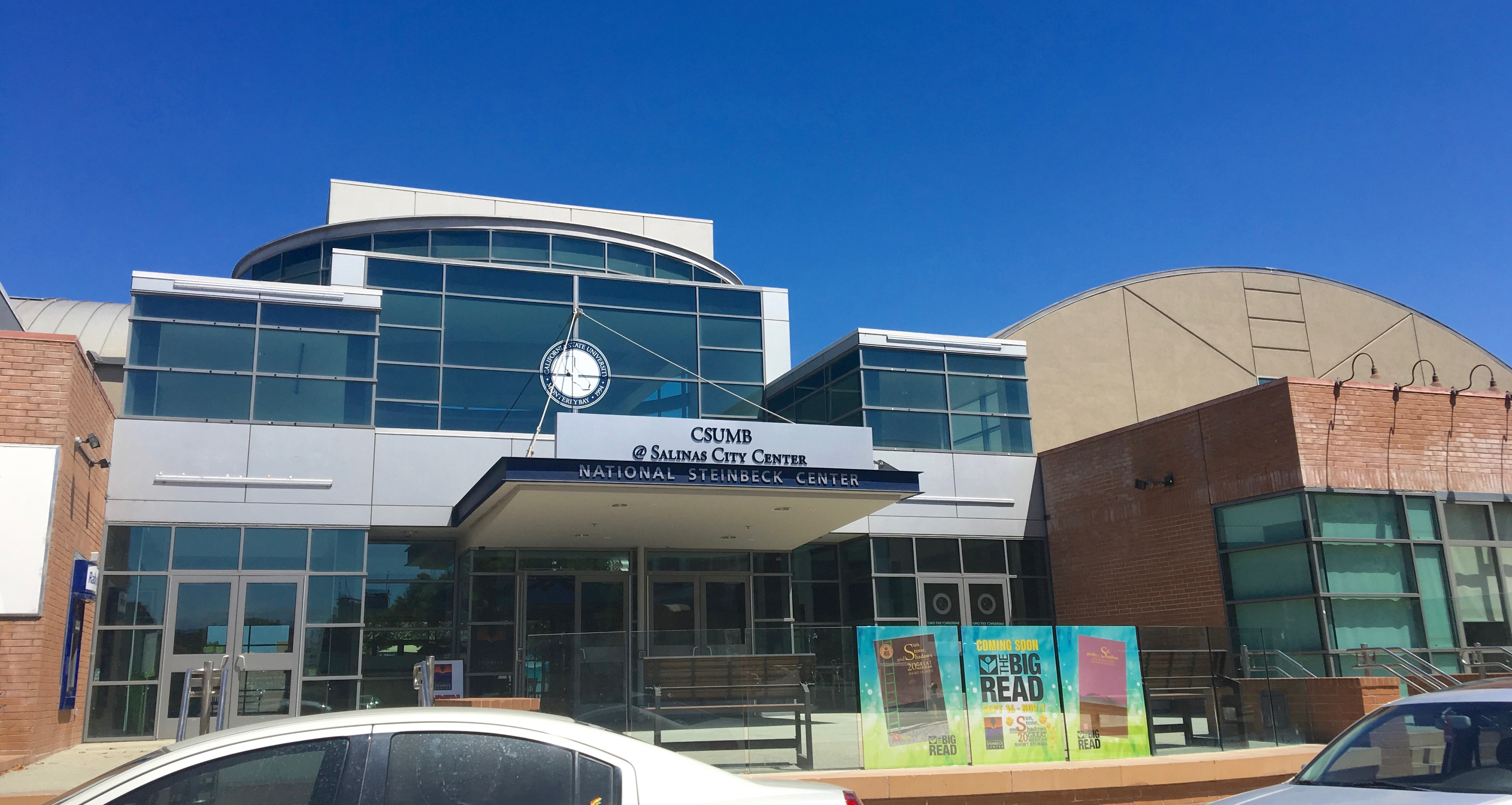
National Steinbeck Center, Salinas California

== Archives and research ==
The National Steinbeck Center Archives consists of over 45,000 historical documents, family documents, manuscripts, letters, photographs, films, interviews, and artifacts all pertaining to author John Steinbeck and the history of his hometown of Salinas. The Archives department manages and preserves these holdings. Currently the NSC is working to digitize and make their collection browsable online.

Interested researchers, scholars, historians and students are able to reserve and schedule time to research the collections with the archivist.

== Events ==
Events and outreach programming makes up the bulk of the National Steinbeck Center's time, effort, and budget. The center plans and runs over 40 events a year. The major events the center is known for is the annual Steinbeck Festival, Steinbeck's Birthday Celebration, the Steinbeck Young Authors Program, and the Salinas Valley Comic Con.

Other smaller and reoccurring events happen throughout the year which all tie to Steinbeck's mission and the center's mission to encourage and support literature, the arts, and other humanities focused causes.

== Partnerships ==
After the acquisition by CSUMB in 2016, the National Steinbeck Center reorganized to the main partner with other local non-profits and cultural groups.

== Gallery ==
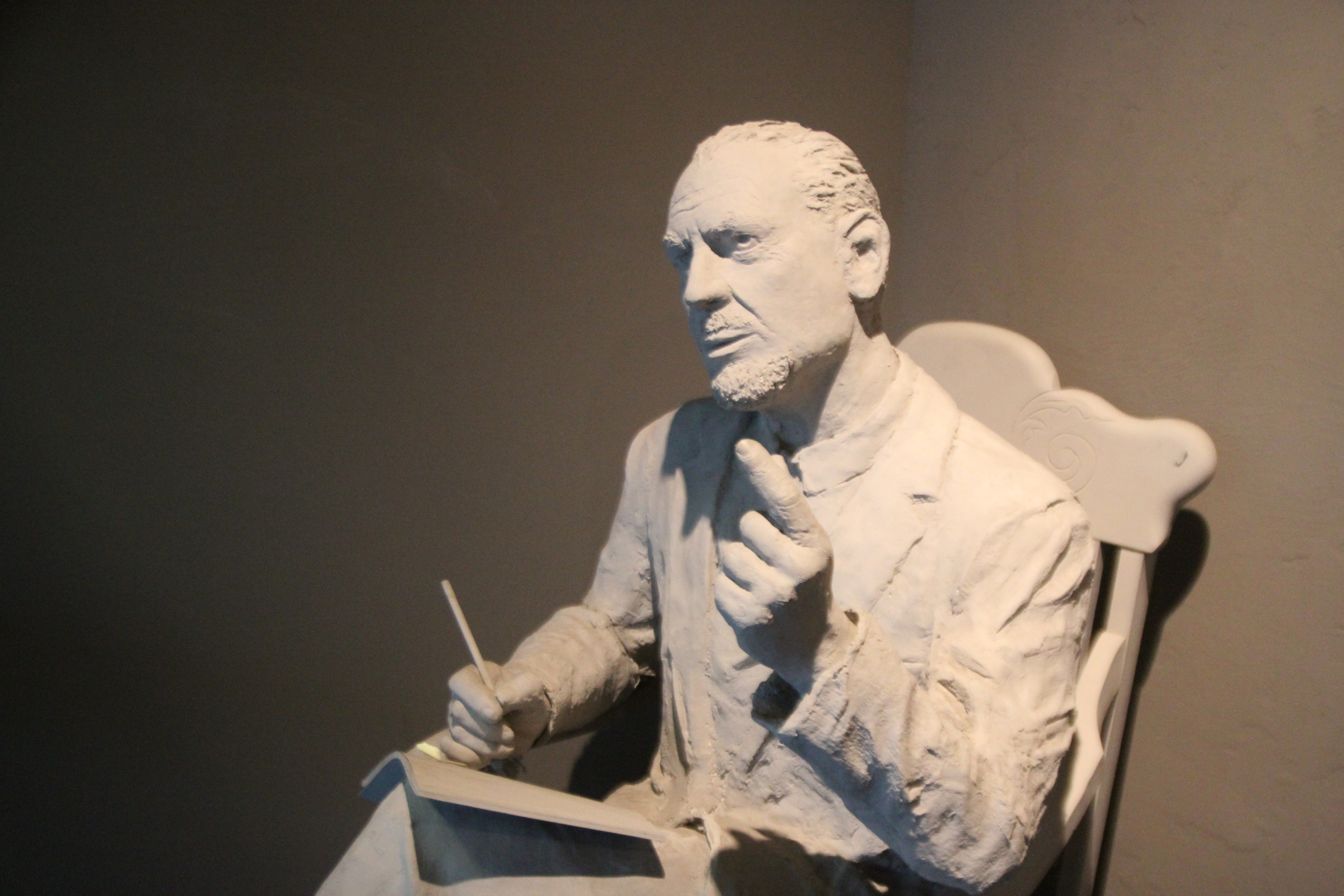
John Steinbeck statue

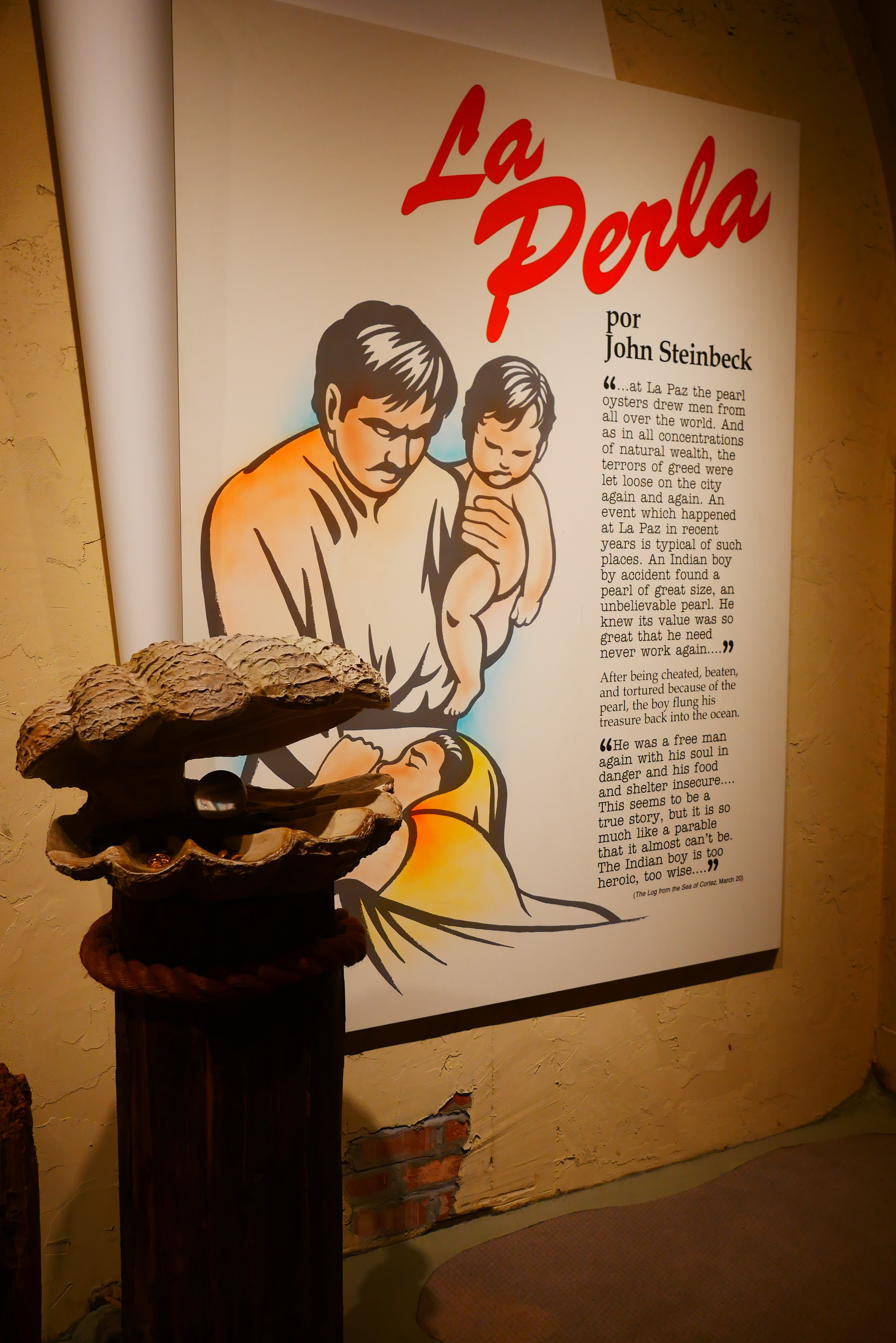
The Pearl exhibit

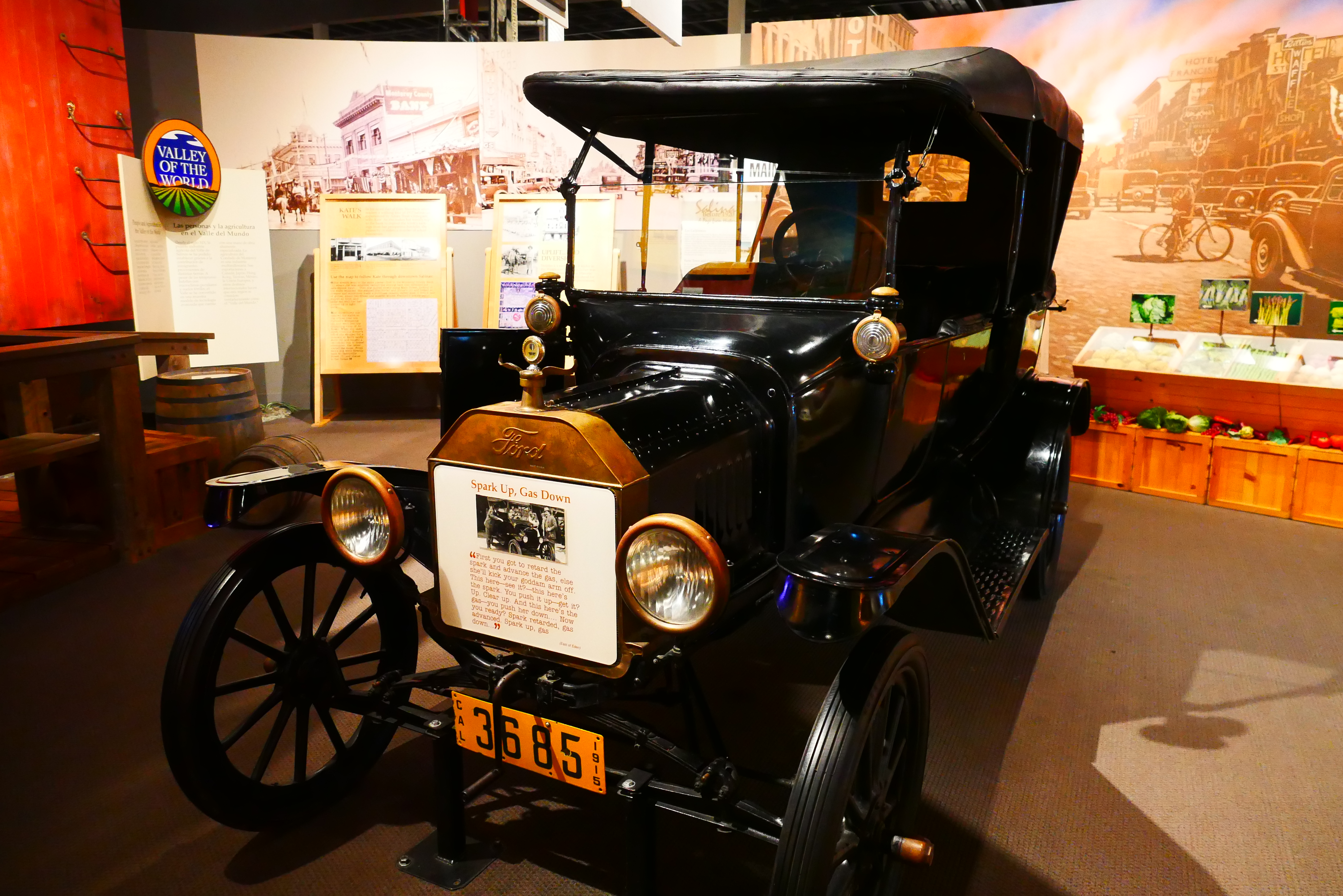
Old Ford car

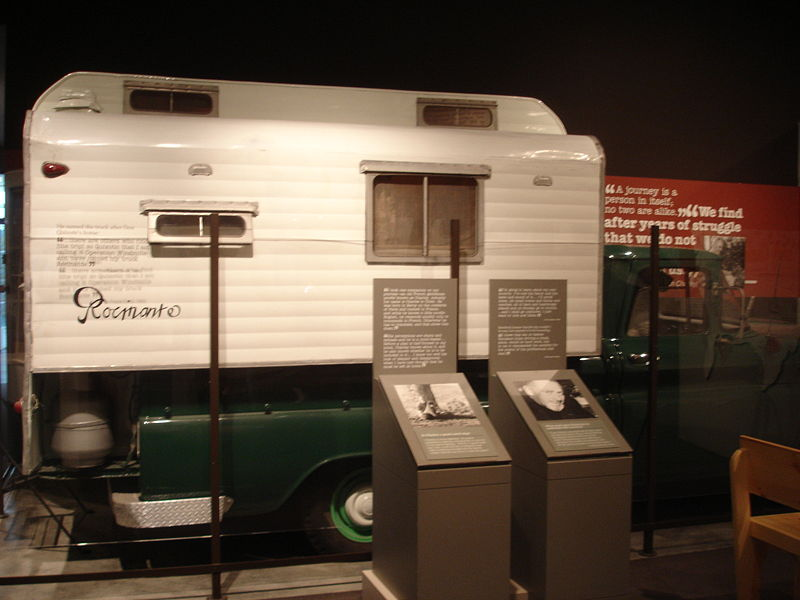
John Steinbeck's camper truck

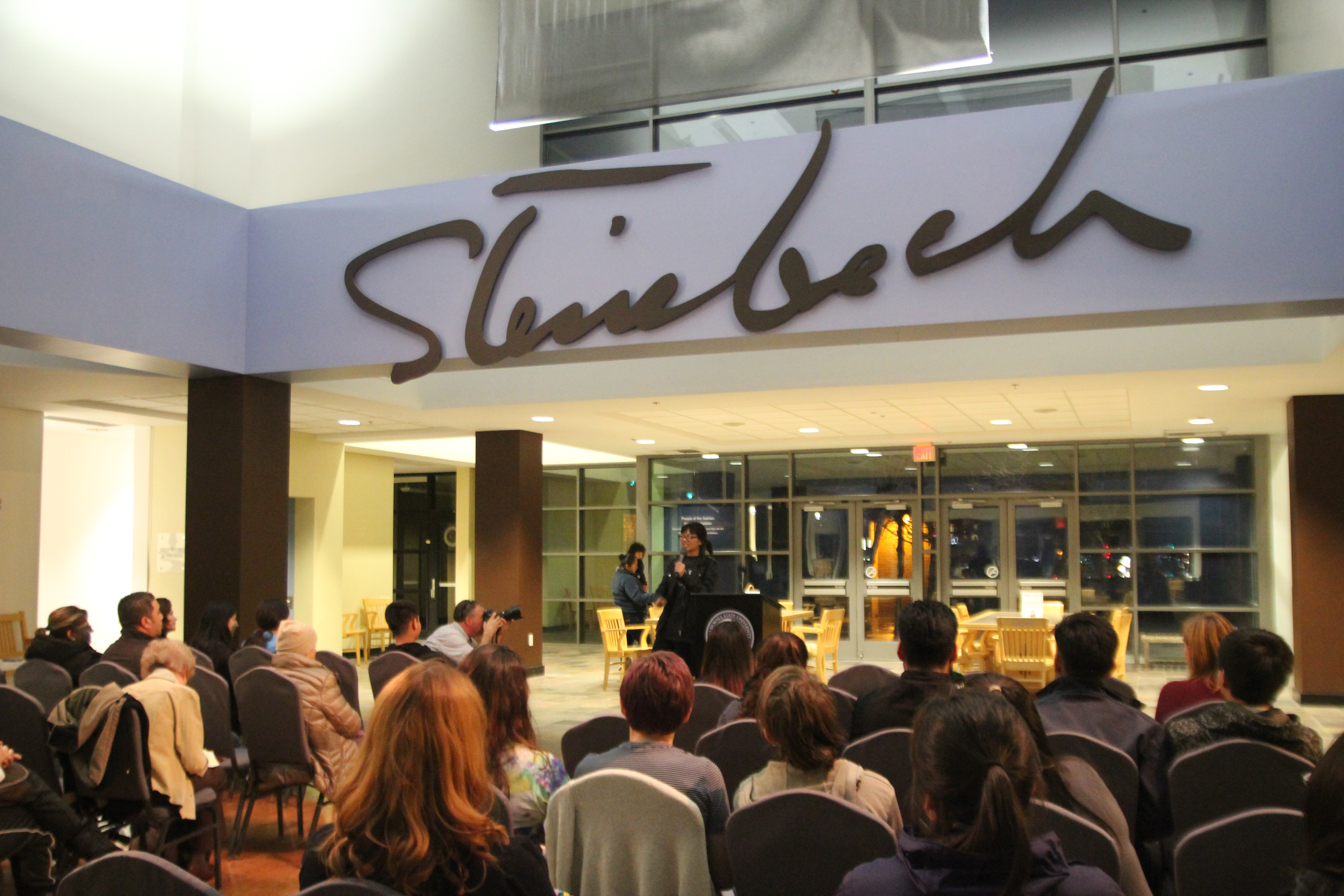
9 February 2017 Poetry Slam at the museum
