= Building typology =

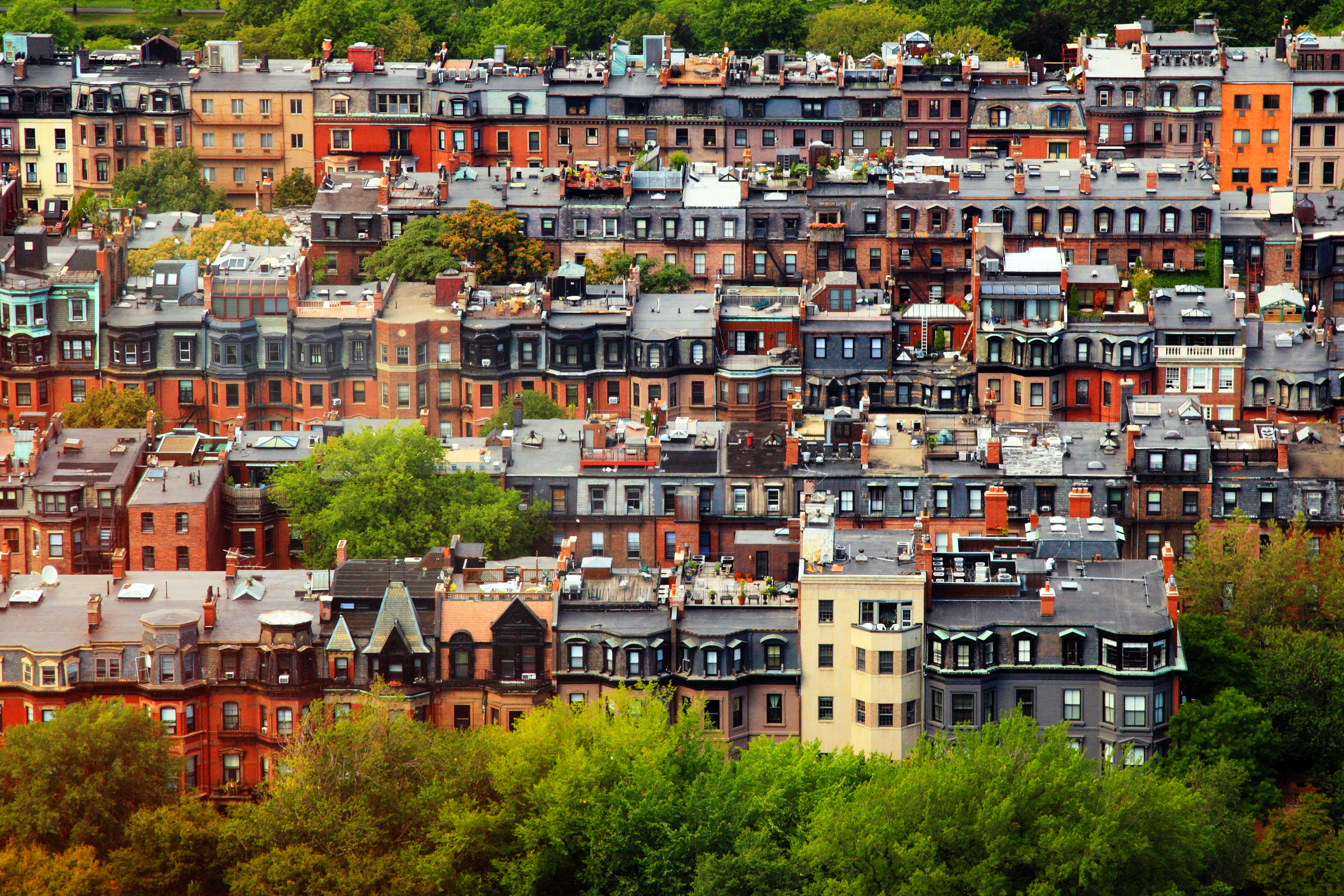
Buildings in Back Bay constitute one or two very common building types of the period. Note that the materials and styles can be very different on the same types.

Building typology refers to building and documenting buildings according to their essential characteristics. In architectural discourse, typological classification tends to focus on building function (use), building form, or architectural style. A functional typology collects buildings into groups such as houses, hospitals, schools, shopping centers, etc. A formal typology groups buildings according to their shape, scale, and site placement, etc. (Formal building typology is also sometimes referred to as morphology (gk. morph).) Lastly, a stylistic typology borrows from art history and identifies building types by their expressive traits, e.g. Doric, Ionic, Corinthian (subtypes of classical), baroque, rococo, gothic, arts and crafts, international, post-modern, etc.

Nikolaus Pevsner has been credited as codifying building typology based on function (functionalism)in the field of architecture with the publication of his 1979 text A History of Building Types.

The three typological practices are interlinked. Namely, each functional type consists of many formal types. For example, the residential functional type may be split into formal categories such as the high rise tower, single family home, duplex, or townhouse. Similarly, while certain stylistic traits may be considered superfluous to a formal building type, style and form are nonetheless related since the conditions (political, economic, technological) that give rise to stylistic traits also enable or encourage certain forms to be expressed. In all three cases the typology serves as a framework for understanding the essential qualities of buildings on conceptually equal footing, apart from their individual, contingent characteristics.

== Functional Typology ==
In 1979, the German-British architectural historian Nikolaus Pevsner published an extended collection of works based on a lecture series he had presented at the National Gallery of Art in Washington, D.C. titled The History of Building Types. In the text, Pevsner detailed the 17 types (laid out as 17 chapters) of buildings which existed as he understood them, based on both synthesis of existing architectural texts and his own original research. The buildings types were separated by their intended and actualized functions within a society and the types are as follows:

- National monuments and monuments to genius
- Government buildings from the late twelfth to the late seventeenth centuries
- Government buildings from the eighteenth century: Houses of parliament
- Government buildings from the eighteenth century: Ministries and public offices
- Government buildings from the eighteenth century: Town halls and law courts
- Theaters
- Libraries
- Museums
- Hospitals
- Prisons
- Hotels
- Exchanges and Banks
- Warehouses and office buildings
- Railway stations
- Market Halls, conservatories, and exhibition buildings
- Shops, stores, and department stores
- Factories

One critique of the functional approach to building typology holds that while certain intended functions may frequently map onto certain architectural forms, the way a building is used by its occupants is not necessarily fixed at the time of its construction. Examples of buildings which are no longer used in a way which matches their function at the time of their construction include:

- The Monterey Bay Aquarium, which is housed in Hovden Cannery buildilng
- The Starbucks Center was originally built as a Sears, Roebuck's & Co. building to manage fulfilling catalog orders on the western coast of the United States

== Formal Typology ==
=== History ===
Autonomous building types arose partly from the general Enlightenment predilection for categorization, a prelude to scientific discovery. At first types were intended as ideal models, which could be variously copied. In this sense types were commonly used forms (a basilica, for example), adapted over time in new buildings with quite different uses: from Roman fora to early church forms (St. Peter's Basilica), to 19th century train stations. The fact that these forms are very similar and are derived from each other is an important way of understanding typology: types are evolved over time and therefore can convey a sense of history or cultural continuity. The idea of building types as formal configurations was enhanced by J.N.L. Durand, who developed two important works: the Parallele (1799), a huge, handsome book that reproduced plans, elevations and sections of historic buildings at the same scale. He categorized them by formal types, so that their basic similarities could be recognized. Durand followed up with a second book that manipulated and reconfigured the classical elements of architecture—columns, walls, etc.—to adapt them to new, emerging uses. Durand's system, a language of architecture, demonstrated one essential characteristic of types: a way of designing that was neither entirely free of constraint nor overly prescribed.

=== Documenting a Formal Building Type ===
Documenting a formal building type is similar to any typological process insofar as the aim is to identify the minimum number of characteristics which make that type distinct. In a formal typology, building types are usually distinguished by their basic shape, site placement, and scale, but not by their specific architectural style, technology, chronology, geographical location or use. For example, a cursory formal analysis of the townhouse will identify the following "minimum essential formal characteristics." In contrast with single family homes that share no walls with adjacent buildings, the townhouse, or rowhouse, shares both party walls (save the corner lot) with its neighbors. While many variations of this formal type are found around the world, each the product of their local environment (color, material, height, fenestration, etc), they nonetheless share the qualities that individual units are placed side-by-side, between two and five stories, with narrow fronts on deep lots, accessed via separate entrances that are setback minimally from the street.

This procedure can be applied to most buildings. For example, several residential types exist in the US, such as garden apartments, townhouses, and high-rise housing. Each of these may have many subtypes. The brownstones in Harlem are different from the rowhouses in Brooklyn. And the large mansions commonly found on corner lots in many cities are distinct from the smaller houses that were built later in between them, even though both are types of "single family home." Anyone can identify types simply by observing the common buildings in a place. Architectural and urban designers document types more thoroughly by measuring them, dating them, noting similar changes to the type that arise over time, and identifying their recurring locations in the city.

=== Application to History ===
Historians, anthropologists, and architectural historians use the documentation of type as a key to other characteristics in a city, for example, events, political control, or economic changes. As theory tells us, when a type evolves over some time, this is an indication that conditions in the city have changed. Anne Moudon documents changes in the types of an Alamo Square neighborhood to tell a kind architectural, cultural and economic history. She also identifies the block, lot and street pattern as key to typological continuity. Multiple studies using this method have identified important building types, for example Chinese shophouses, Shanghai's Shikumen housing, terrace housing in Great Britain, Courtyard buildings in France, and the atrium houses found in many hot climates. Atrium types are also important for mosques, shopping malls, and some hotels.

=== Application to Building Design ===
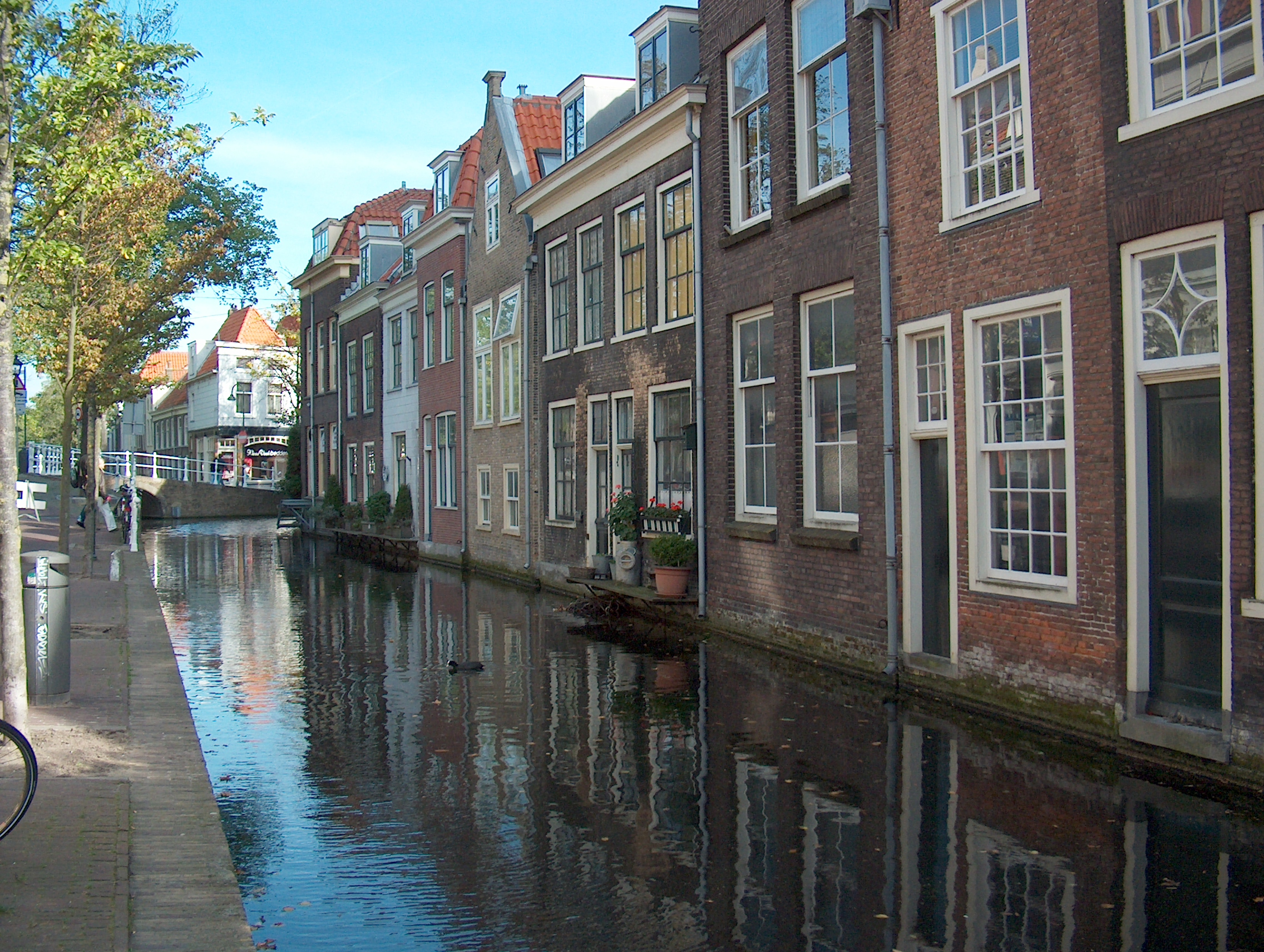
Houses along the canal in Delft are a type common just to this area.

Building types are critical to architects because they are a starting point for designing. One need not reinvent the form if a common building type, say an office building, is wanted. Most architects develop a sense of common building types over time, even without acknowledging their importance. Architects know the approximate dimensions, bulk, site placement, and internal circulation that dictates most types. This allows them to work quickly to determine the parts of the design problem which are unique: material, orientation, structure, specific dimensions, entrance, and so on. One school of thought in Italy, started by Saverio Muratori, recognizes the importance of typology in providing continuity in the city. These architects have been influential in recognizing the role of type for modern architecture, where the newest buildings are encouraged to actively assimilate many typological characteristics, without imitating historical styles.

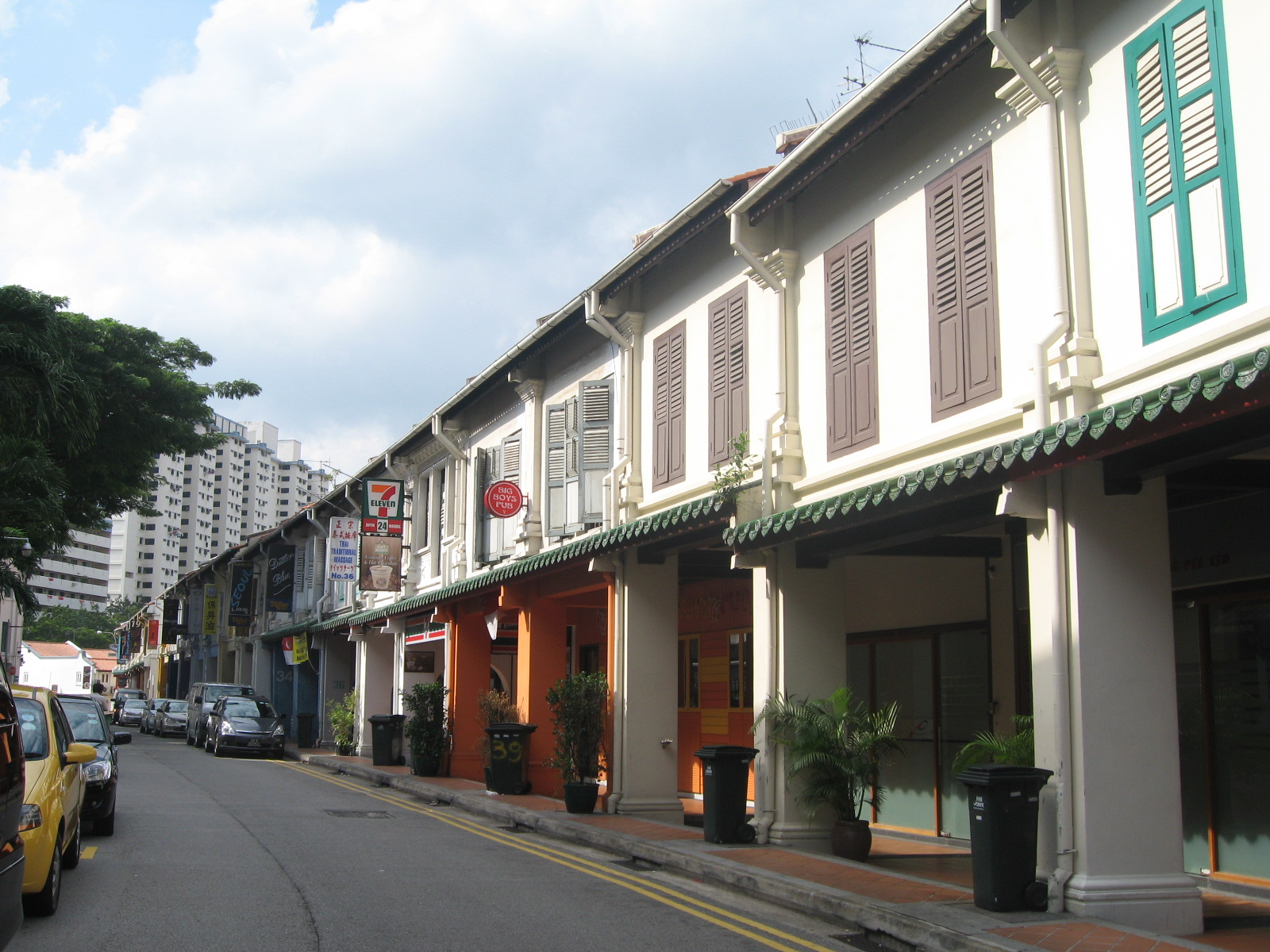
A common type in Asia is the "shophouse" which has an open shop on the ground floor and rooms above for living.

=== "A Pattern Language" ===
A unique example of formal typological classification is A Pattern Language developed by Christopher Alexander. While Alexander does not focus on classifying complete buildings by type, he instead breaks down buildings into their components and then classifies those components by their essential qualities, which he calls "patterns." [More explanation needed.]

=== Application to Urban Design ===
Common types are the building blocks of the city. Usually, a neighborhood streets and lots are laid out so that the common type can be built there. This occurs today in suburban subdivisions, but it has been a pattern in history, as well. This combination of types, streets and lots is called an urban tissue, or a plan unit. When studying a city, a designer identifies the common tissue patterns in place and may decide to link to them, imitate them, or otherwise recognize them as an historical artifact. A movement of urban theorists and practitioners in the US, New Urbanism, has identified building typology as a key to defining more user-friendly places. In trying to preserve neighborhoods or building new ones, building types once again become the building blocks of the city, and may be codified in law as form-based codes.
