= Cannery Row =

Historic waterfront area in Monterey, California

Coordinates: 36.6165°N 121.9006°W

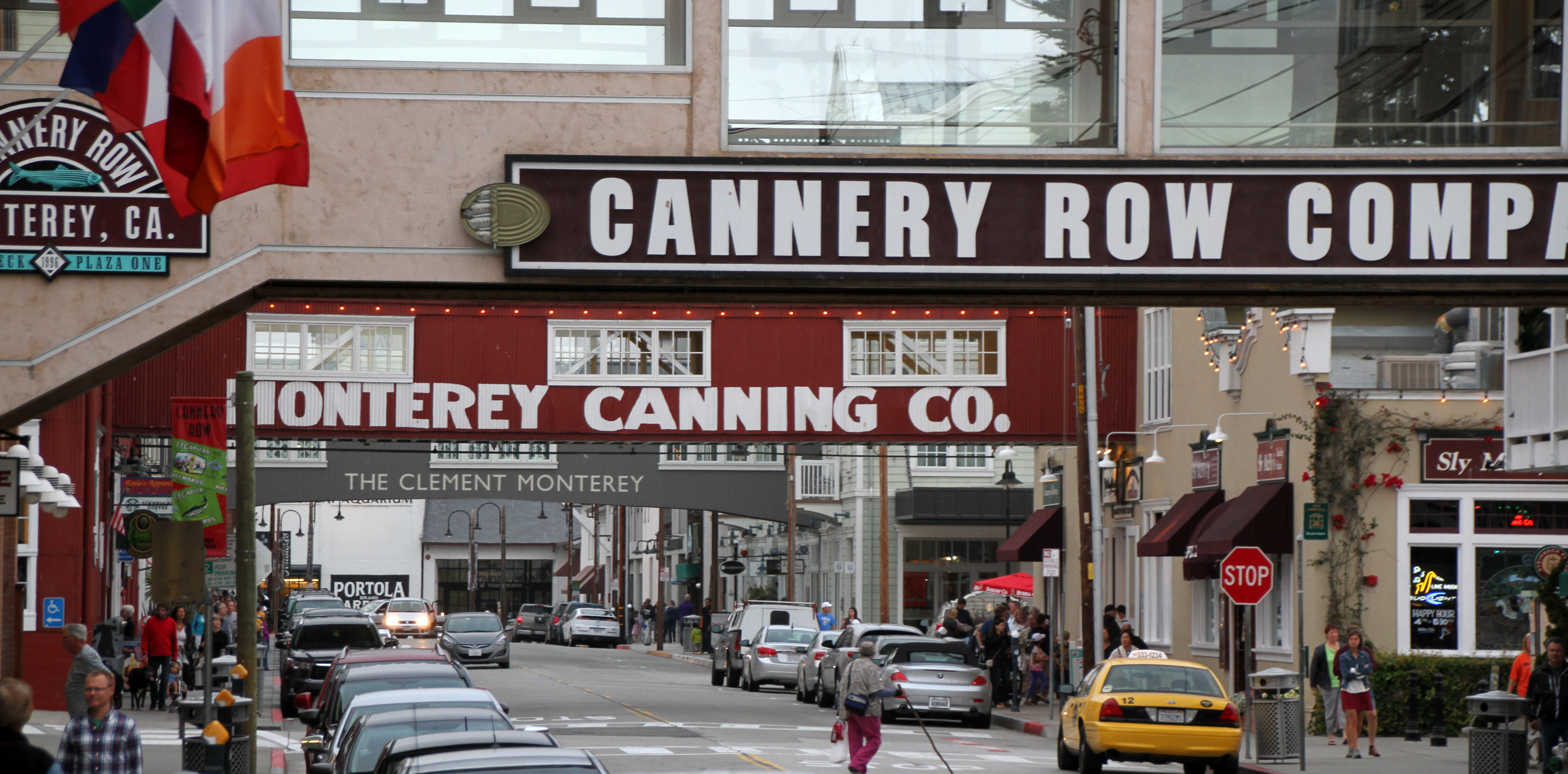
- Cannery Row, 2014
- Interactive map of Cannery Row
- Former name: Ocean View Avenue
- Namesake: Cannery Row
- Length: 0.8 mi (1.3 km)
- Location: New Monterey, Monterey, California, United States
- Nearest metro station: Monterey–Salinas Transit JAZZ A JAZZ B

Construction
- Construction start: c. 1850 (first dirt track) c. 1900 (cement and asphalt)
- Inauguration: January 1958

Cannery Row is a historic waterfront street in New Monterey, Monterey, California once home to a thriving sardine canning industry. Originally named Ocean View Avenue, it was nicknamed "Cannery Row" as early as 1918 and officially renamed in 1958. The area was immortalized in John Steinbeck's Cannery Row (1945) and Sweet Thursday (1954). The area retains many of its early industrial structures and is listed as a significant cultural and historic landmark in Monterey.

Monterey’s canning industry began in 1902 and expanded rapidly during World War I, when high demand for canned fish led to the construction of numerous canneries along the shoreline. At its peak in the early 1940s, more than 30 canneries and reduction plants lined Ocean View Avenue. After the sardine population collapsed in the postwar years, the canneries closed one by one, with the last shutting down in 1973. In the following decades the former industrial buildings were adapted into shops, restaurants, and attractions, including the transformation of the Hovden Cannery site into the Monterey Bay Aquarium, which opened in 1984.

== Description ==
Cannery Row is a historic commercial street in Monterey, California, formerly known as Ocean View Avenue before being renamed in 1958 in honor of John Steinbeck's novel Cannery Row. The street runs along the coastline of Monterey Bay, beginning at the Coast Guard station near the harbor entrance and extending toward Pacific Grove, where it turns inland near the Monterey Bay Aquarium.

Cannery Row retains a number of historic industrial and commercial buildings associated with the sardine canning industry. These include part of the Hovden Cannery (1916), the Monterey Canning Company Warehouse (1918), Wing Chong Market (1918), the Conveyor Bridge (1918), and Pacific Biological Laboratories (1937).

== History ==
Monterey's sardine industry began at the turn of the century, and grew over the next five decades to become the nation's leading fishing port. Production surged during World War I to meet the increased demand for canned goods. New canneries were built, forming a continuous row along Ocean View Avenue. The term "Cannery Row" dates from this period. During Cannery Row's peak years, in the early 1940s, 30 canneries and reduction plants lined the commercial street, each with its own colorful sardine label on packing labels and tins, and individual whistle that summoned workers to their shifts. Business slowed during the Great Depression, but picked up again during World War II. After the war, the sardine population declined and a few years later vanished from Monterey Bay. Canneries and packing houses closed one by one. Hovden was the last cannery to close in 1973; Hovden's former building site was later transformed into the new Monterey Bay Aquarium.

=== Early years (1902–1919) ===
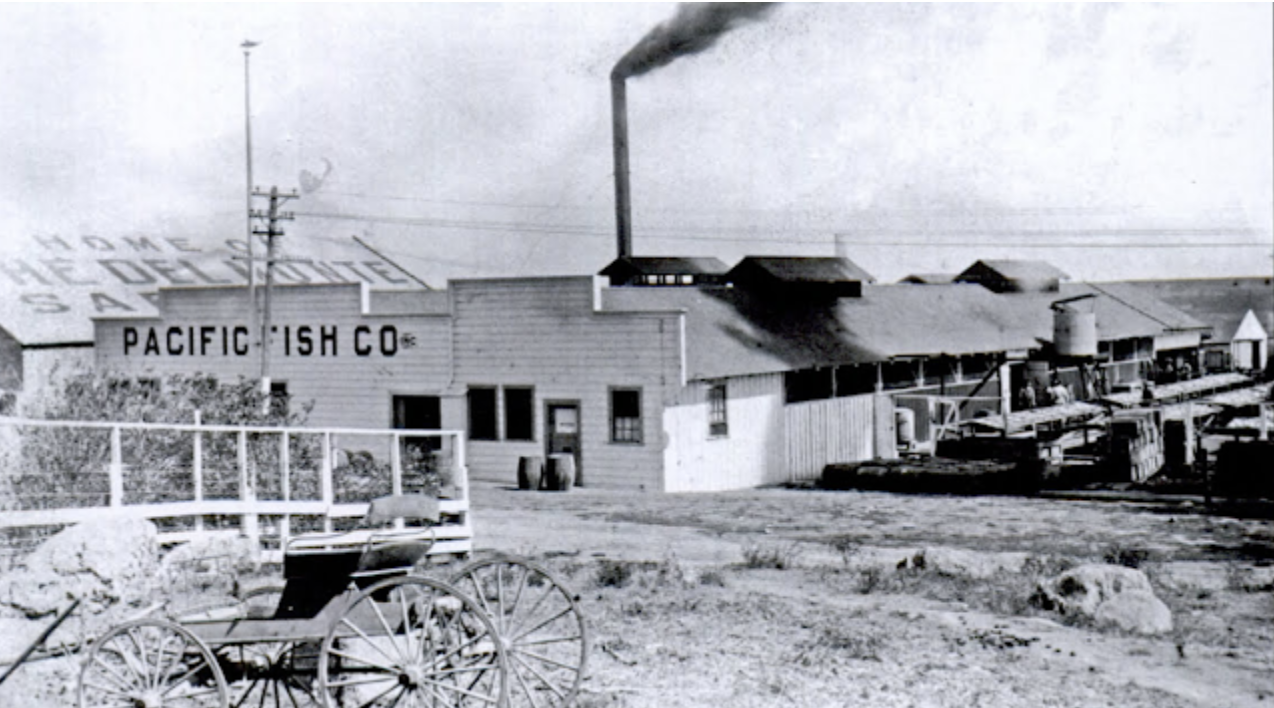
Pacific Fish Co., 1909

In 1902, Frank E. Booth purchased a failing cannery on Fisherman's Wharf with the intention to can salmon. He renamed the business the Monterey Packing Company. After observing the plentiful supply of sardines in Monterey Bay, Booth decided to can sardines. After a fire destroyed Booth's cannery in 1903, he rebuilt and expanded his operation, renaming the new company the F.E. Booth Cannery. South of Fisherman's Wharf, the first major cannery built on Ocean View Avenue was the Monterey Fishing and Canning Company, which opened in March 1902. The small cannery was later renamed the Pacific Fish Company in 1908 after it was sold to new owners.

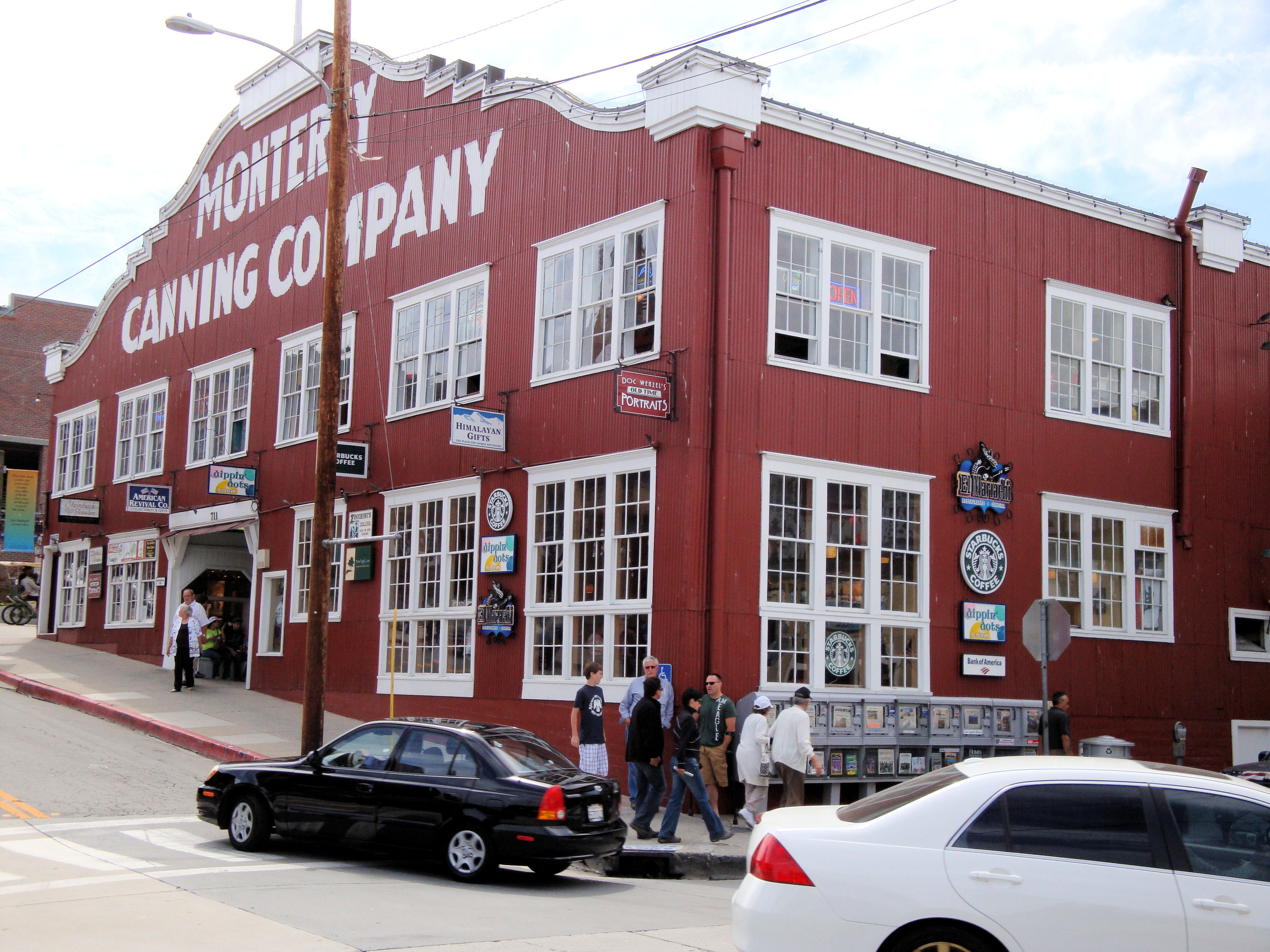
Monterey Canning Company, 2008

Booth hired the Norwegian fisheries expert and engineer Knut Hovden in 1905 to help modernize his business. Booth also enlisted Sicilian fishermen Pietro Ferrante and Orrazio Enea to help recruit a large labor force of fellow Sicilians and improve fishing efficiency, ensuring a more reliable supply of sardines to the canneries. Ferrante introduced the Mediterranean-style Lampara net to Monterey Bay. Use of the net by local fishermen dramatically increased the cannery's fish supply. In 1913, Hovden developed a modern assembly-line system for large-scale sardine canning.

Demand for Monterey sardines rose sharply in 1914 after France suspended sardine exports due to World War I. The U.S. government promoted the consumption of canned fish because they could be easily shipped overseas to feed troops and civilians in Europe. This demand fueled a massive expansion in the canning industry, particularly for sardines. As part of the war effort, posters were produced emphasizing the connection between canning and Allied victory. Booth's Cannery became one of the largest fish canneries in California. The growing demand for canned sardines also inspired others, including Knut Hovden in 1916, to build their own canneries and reduction plants on Ocean View Avenue; the street soon became known as Cannery Row. By 1918 the canneries were producing 1.4 million sardine cans a year. New canneries built during this period include Hovden Food Products, Monterey Canning Company, Pacific Fish Company, San Xavier Canning Company, The Carmel Canning Company, and the Great West Sardine Company.

=== Boom years (1920–1946) ===
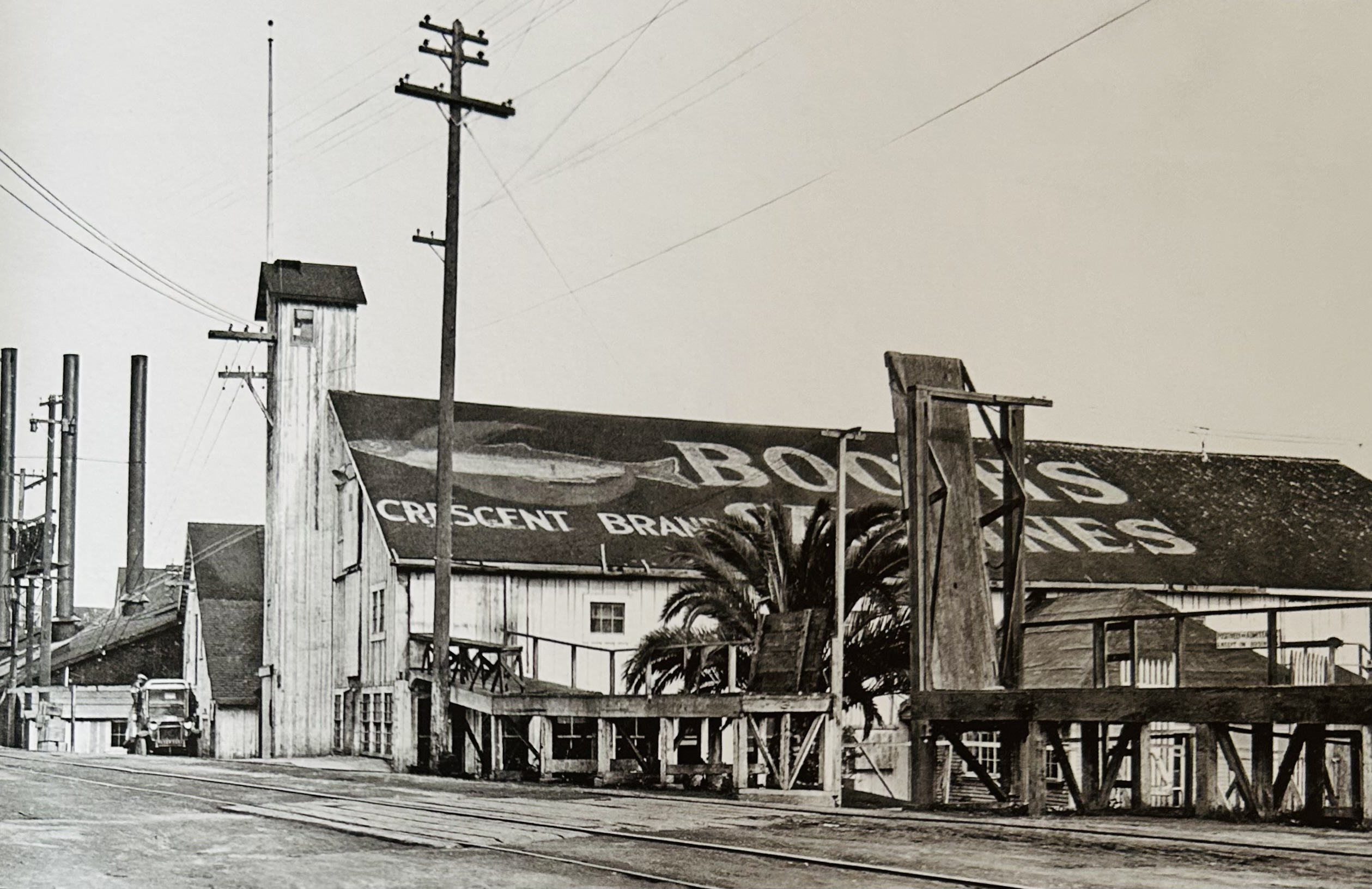
Booth's Cannery, c. 1920

The busy canneries and reduction plants employed fishermen, primarily Sicilian and Japanese, along with a diverse labor force of cannery workers including Portuguese, Sicilians, Hispanics, Chinese, and Anglo-Europeans; many were women and children. In the 1930s and 1940s, Sicilian women made up approximately 30% of the cannery workforce and they typically packed sardine cans. Before cannery processes were automated, Asian and Hispanic men and women typically worked as fish cutters, while white men handled mechanical tasks such as tending the boilers that cooked the canned fish. Cannery operations revolved around the sardine catch. There was little work from March to September. When the sardines were running from October to February and the boats came into the harbor loaded with fish, workers were called to the production line by whistles unique to each plant. The work continued until every fish was either canned or reduced, with 12- to 15-hour shifts being the norm.

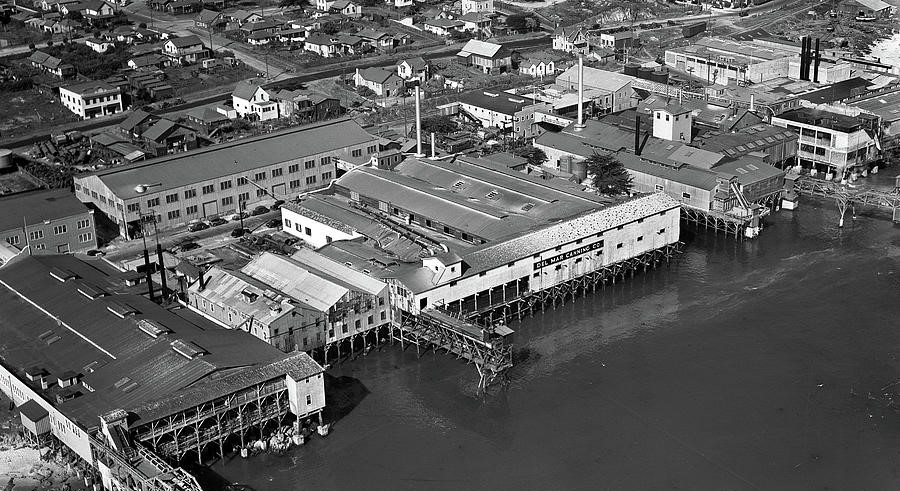
Cannery buildings, New Monterey, 1938

In the early 1940s, over 24 canneries and reduction plants operated on Cannery Row. The sardine season saw wide fluctuations in total catch from year to year. At its peak, the canneries employed 3,000 to 4,000 people in fishing, canning, and reduction—nearly half of Monterey’s 10,000 residents. During slow periods, canneries continued to be profitable by processing fish meal. The industry declined during the Great Depression, but increased demand during World War II led to another boom for the canning industry and the construction of more canneries in the southern part of Cannery Row.

=== Industry decline (1947–1973) ===
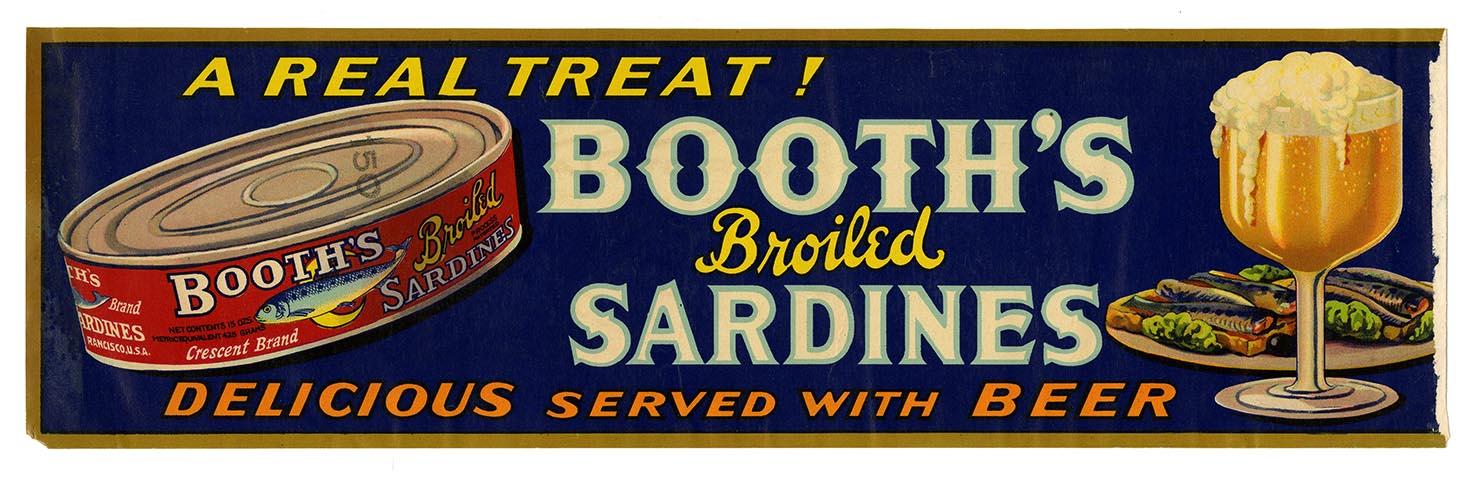
Booth's broiled sardine label

The decline of Monterey's sardine fishery was probably the result of a combination of overfishing, shifts in ocean tides and temperatures, and long-term sardine life cycles. At the height of production in 1946, the total sardine catch was 142,282 tons; a year later the total catch had dropped to 26,818 tons. Many factories closed in the late 1940s and early 1950s. Hovden Cannery stayed open until 1973 by canning squid. By 1958, there were five surviving, struggling canneries. The canneries were no longer packing sardines, but a combination of tuna, anchovy, and mackerel. The California Packing Company, one of the largest and oldest canneries, closed in 1962. Abandoned waterfront properties were bought by investors eager to capitalize on California’s growing tourism industry.

== Steinbeck's Cannery Row ==
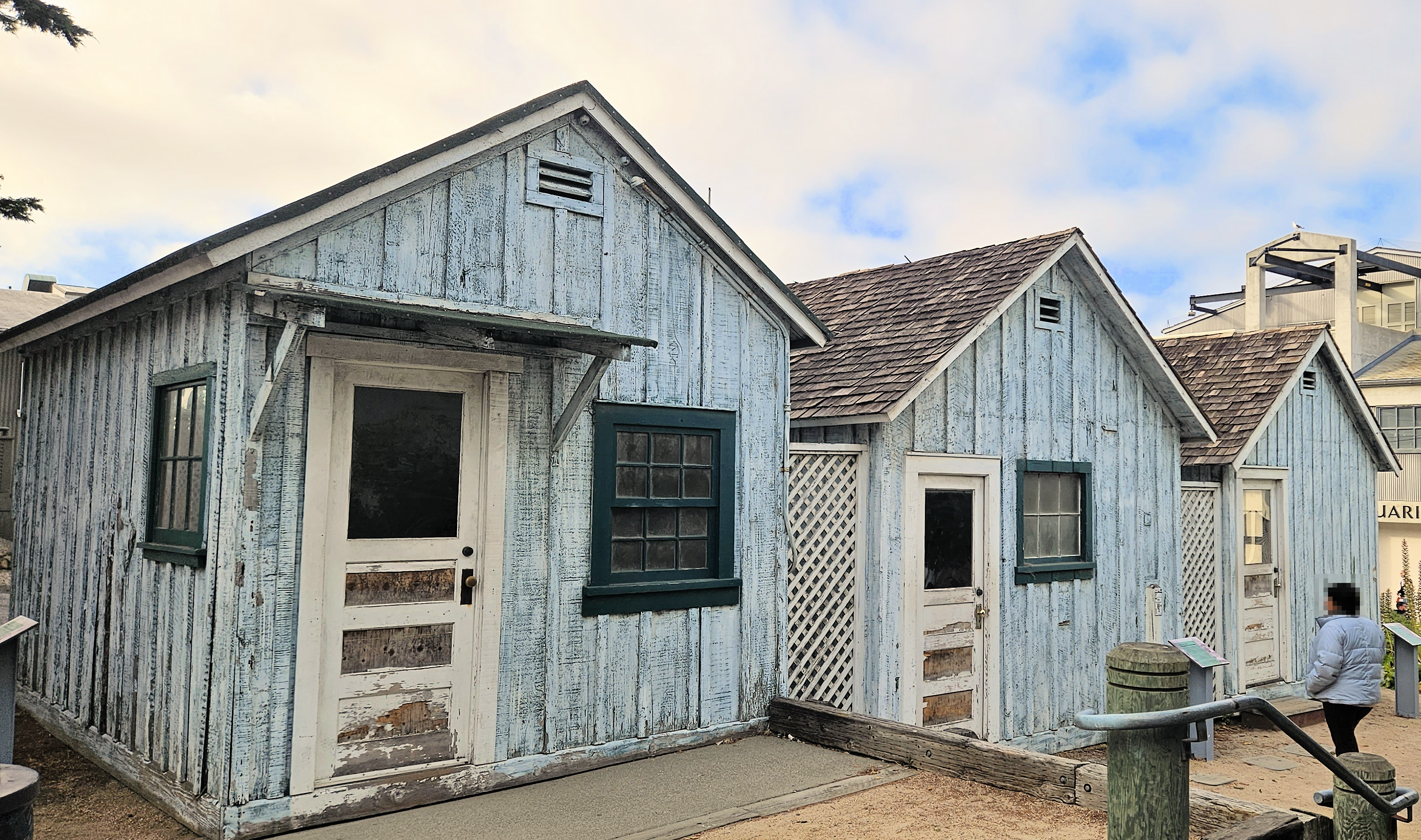
Replicas of Cannery Worker shacks

The Cannery Row waterfront was immortalized by John Steinbeck's novels Cannery Row (1945) and Sweet Thursday (1954). The first book was set in the Great Depression, and opens with Steinbeck describing Cannery Row as "a poem, a stink, a grating noise, a quality of light, a tone, a habit, a nostalgia, a dream." The story revolves around Doc, a local marine biologist, and his relationship with Mack and friends, a group of unemployed men, and other residents living on Cannery Row. Pacific Biological Laboratories was a biological supply house managed by Edward F. Ricketts, who was the inspiration for Doc, and several other characters in Steinbeck novels.

== Tourism ==
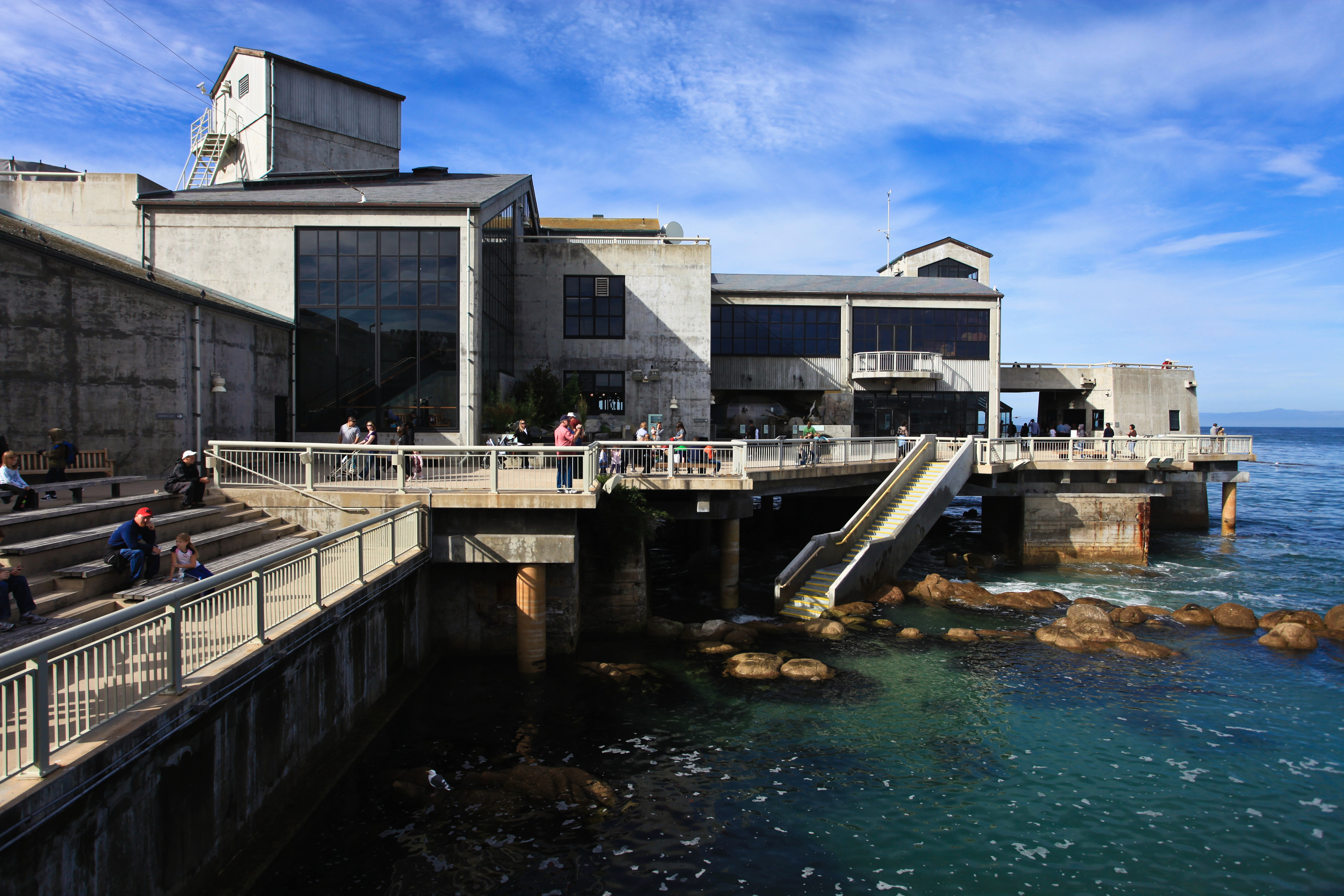
Monterey Bay Aquarium

Cannery Row is now a tourist attraction with many restaurants and hotels, several of which are located in former cannery buildings. The Monterey Bay Aquarium is located at the north end of Cannery Row. The aquarium stands on the site of the Hovden Cannery, which was built in 1916 and operated until it went out of business––the last Monterey cannery to do so––in 1973. The aquarium was constructed around the cannery's boiler house, which is preserved as a non-functioning public exhibit.

== See also ==
- Canned fish
- John Steinbeck bibliography
- List of canneries
- Sardines as food

== Gallery ==
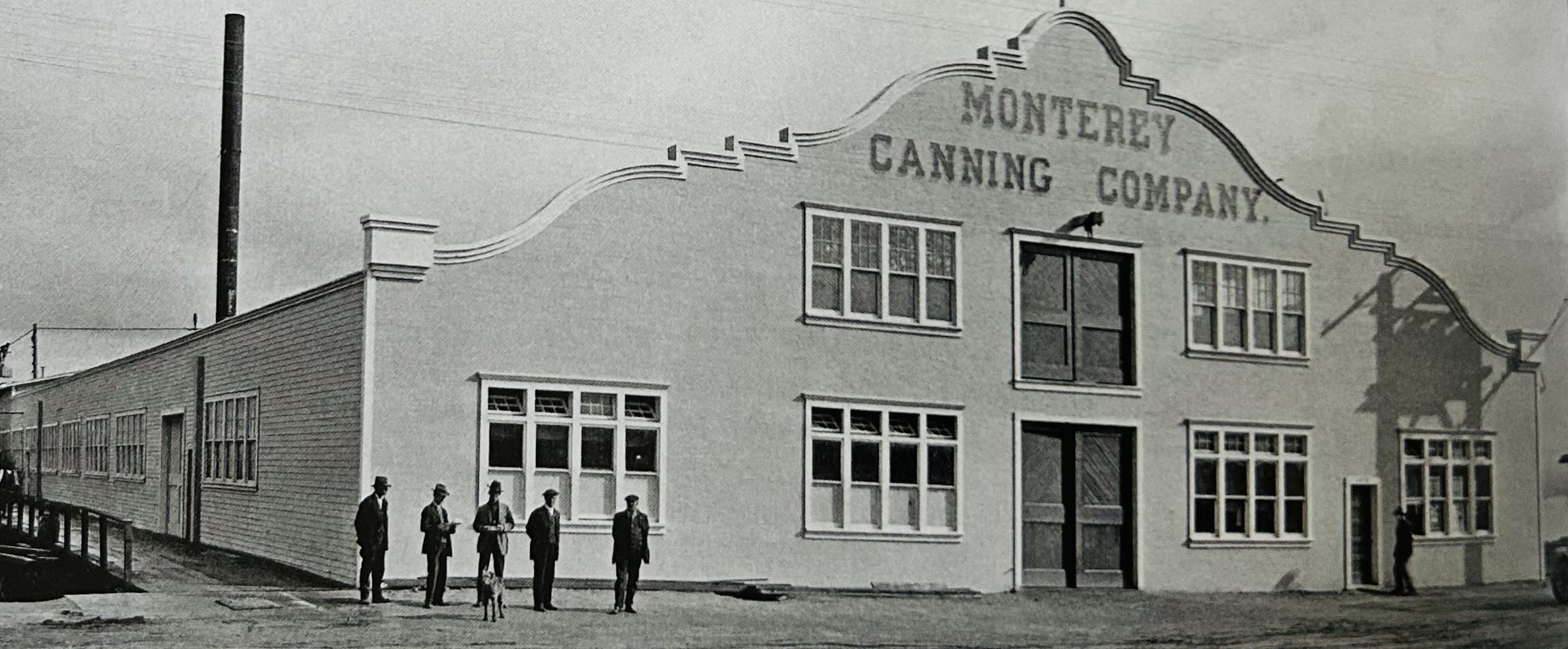
Monterey Cannery Co., 1918

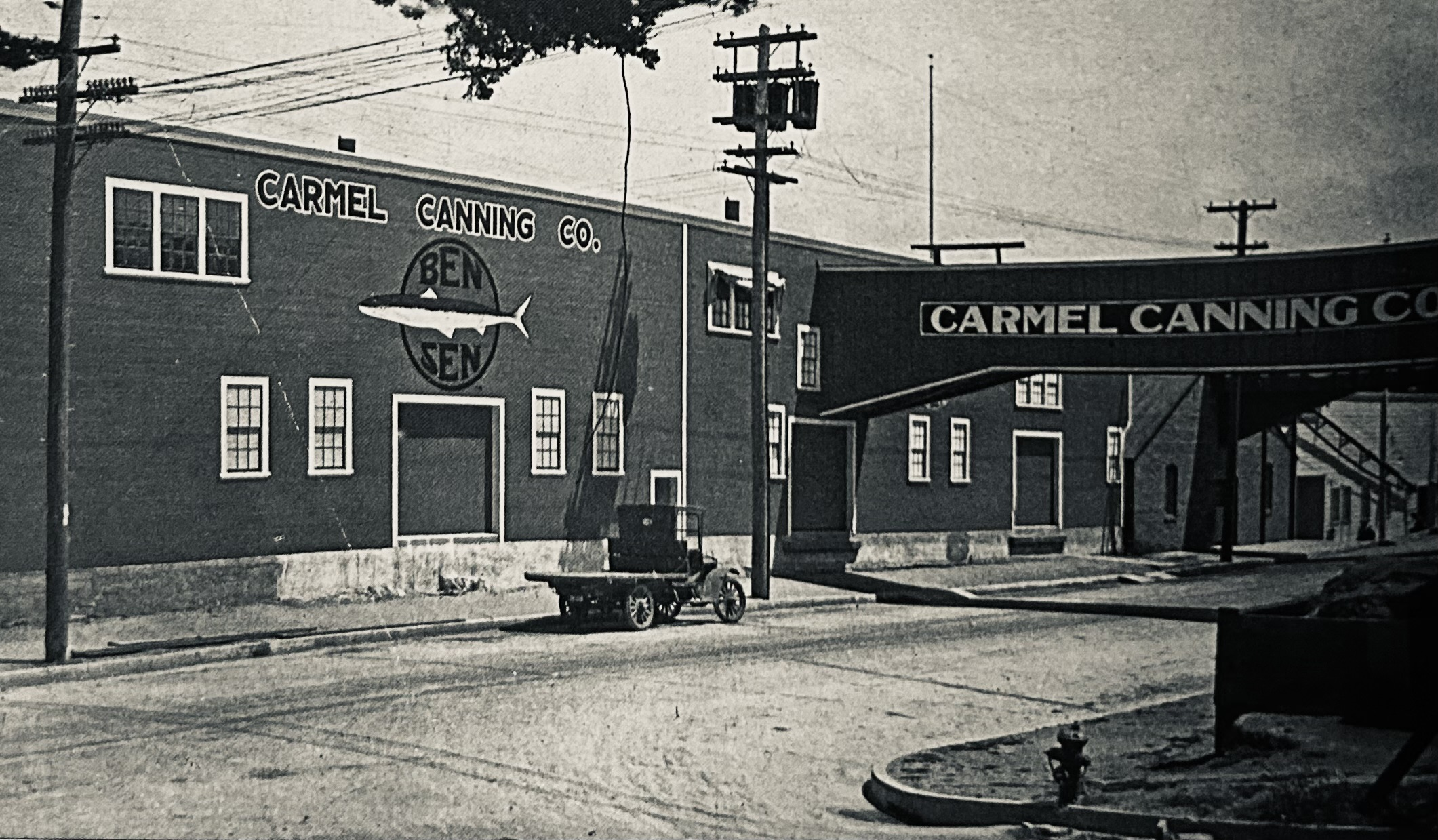
Carmel Canning Co., c. 1920

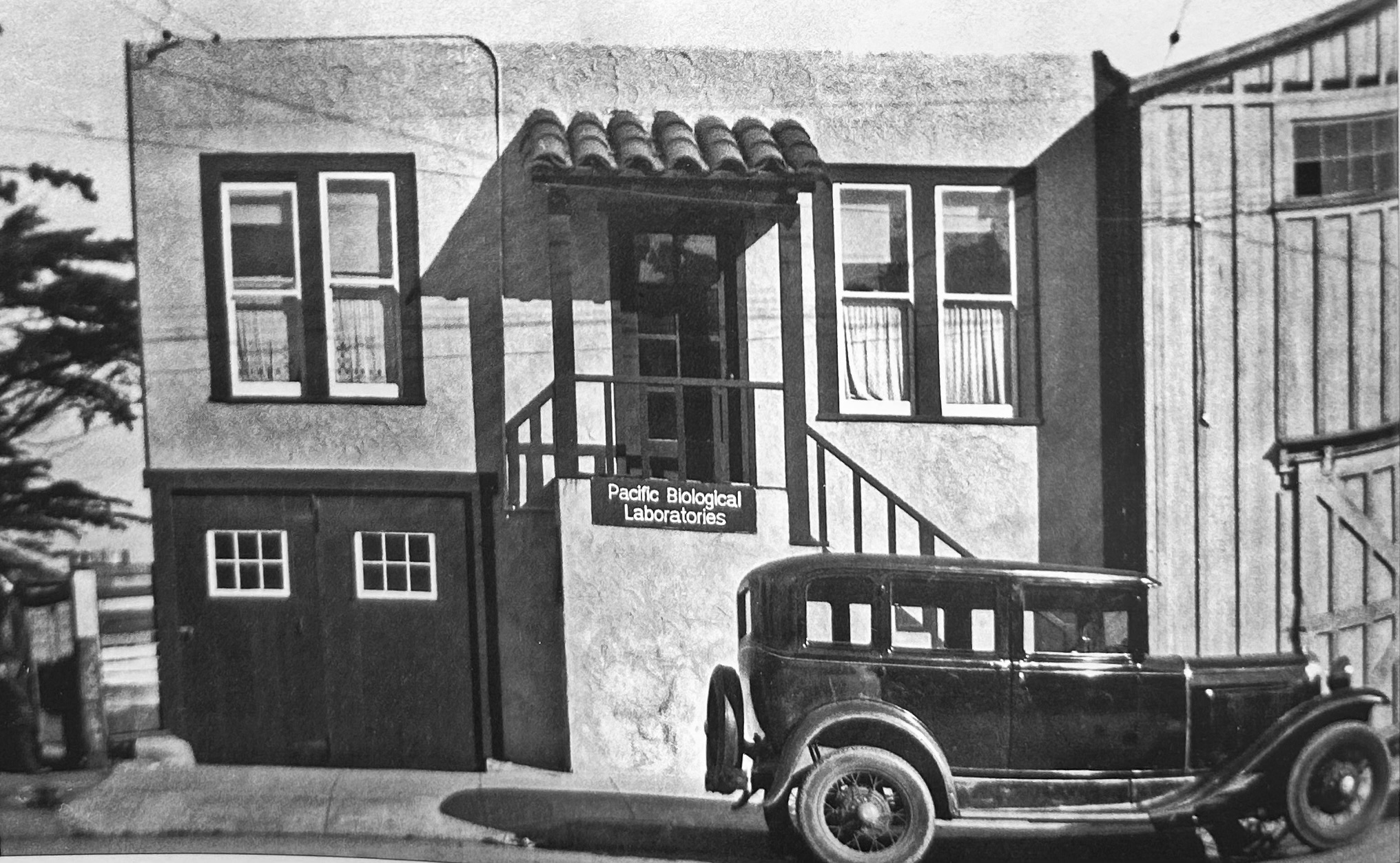
Pacific Biological Laboratories, 1928

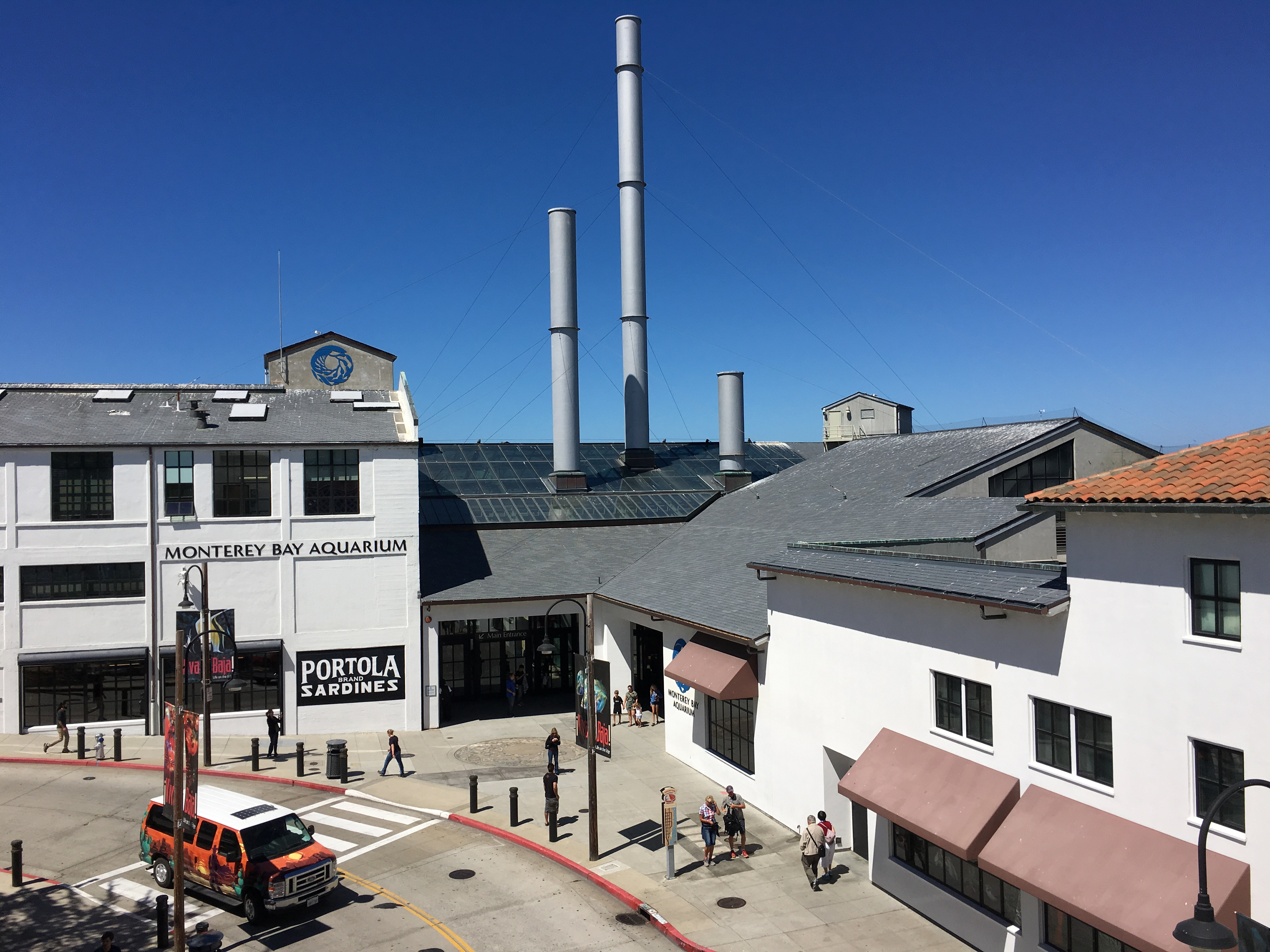
Exterior, Monterey Bay Aquarium

== Sources ==
- Chiang, Connie Y. (2008). Shaping the Shoreline: Fisheries and Tourism on the Monterey Coast. Seattke: University of Washington Press. ISBN 978-0295988313.
- Hemp, Michael Kenneth (1986). Cannery Row: The History of Old Ocean Avenue. The History Company. ISBN 978-0941425001.
- Manglesdorf, Tom (1986). A History of Steinbeck's Cannery Row. Santa Cruz: Western Tanager Press.
- McKibben, Carol Lynn (2006). Beyond Cannery Row: Sicilian Women, Immigration, and Community in Monterey, California, 1915-99. University of Illinois Press. ISBN 978-0252073007.
- Walton, John (1997). "Chapter 8: Cannery Row: Class, Community and the Social Construction of History". In Hall, John R. (ed.). Reworking Class. Cornell University Press.
