= The Norwegian Club of San Francisco =

Private social club in San Francisco, California

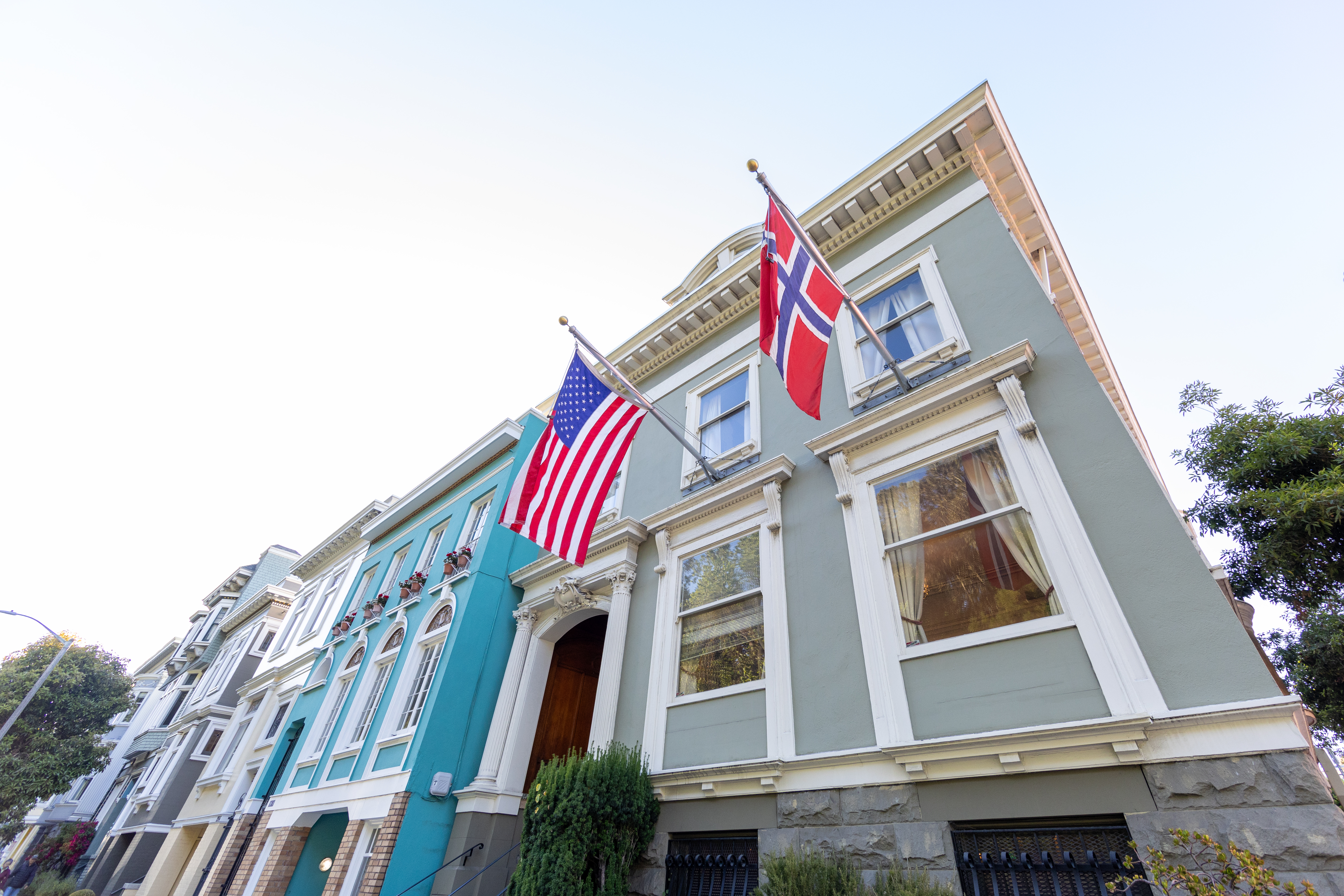
Clubhouse since 1936 at 1900 Fell street

The Norwegian Club (Den Norske Klub) is a private social club located in San Francisco, California. Since 1936, the club has been headquartered at 1900 Fell Street. As of 2022, its members are primarily of Norwegian descent, and has continued to host regular cultural and social events.

The club operates under laws for 501(c)(7) Social and Recreation Clubs; in 2024 it claimed total revenue of $160,692 and total assets of $434,898.

== History ==
According to club member Ralph Enger, it was founded in 1898 as Den Norske Klub Fram by Knud Henry Lund, then consul at the Swedish-Norwegian consulate, along with 12 other Norwegian immigrants. The club was established to welcome polar explorer Fridtjof Nansen, who was on a speaking tour in the United States and expected to visit San Francisco.

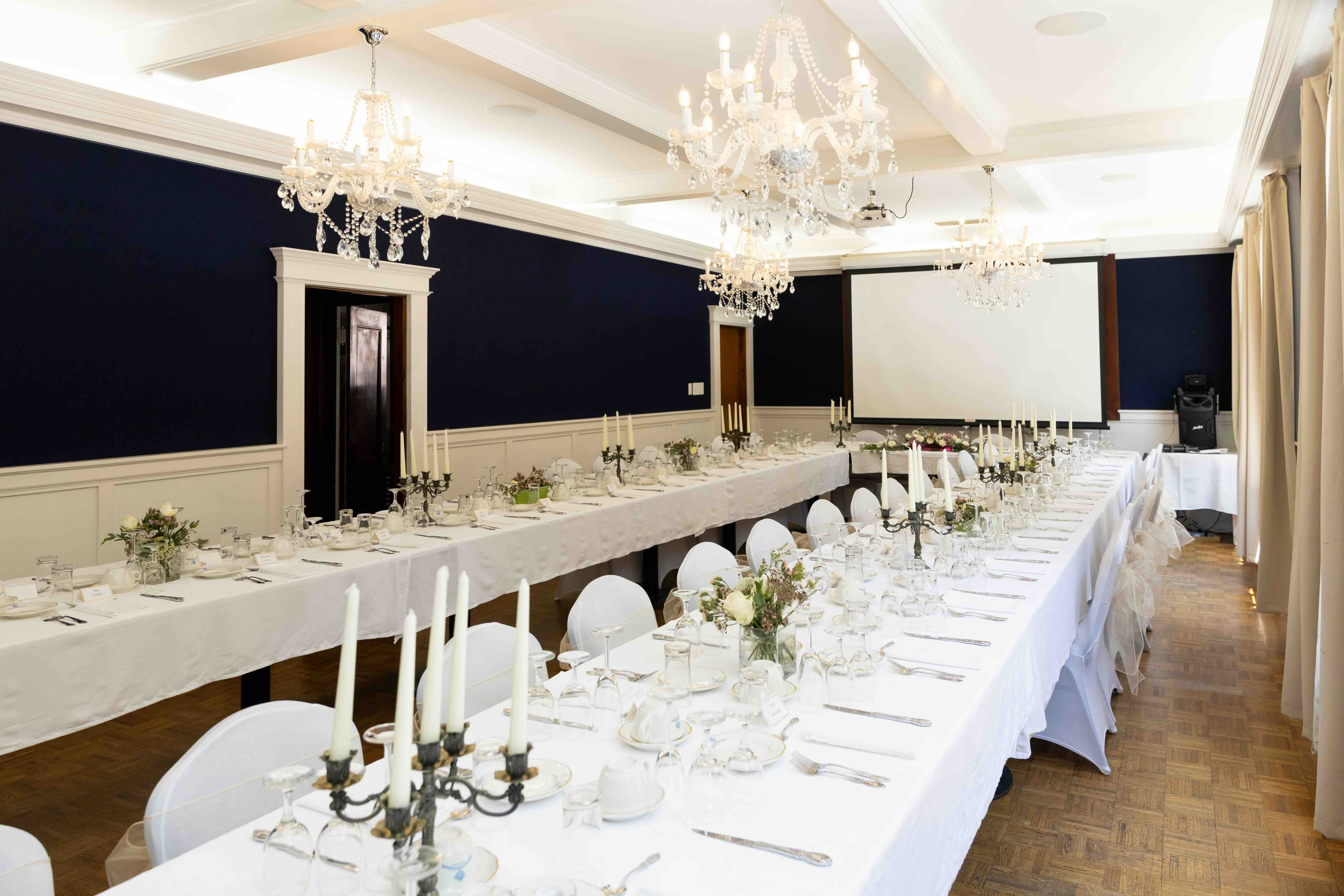
Dining room at 1900 Fell Street

In 1906, the club hosted a celebration for Roald Amundsen following his successful navigation of the Northwest Passage and arrival in San Francisco. Club president Olaf Tveitmoe presented an honorary membership to Amundsen.

In 1915, members including gold prospector Jafet Lindeberg played a key role in ensuring Norway’s representation at the Panama-Pacific International Exposition.

The clubhouse at 99 Divisadero Street could house 8-10 members, with one of its residents being labor leader Andrew Furuseth.

Club members also helped to lead efforts to repatriate the polar ship Gjøa to Norway in 1972, after it had spent six decades on display in Golden Gate Park.

In 2020, the club voted to allow women to become full members, boosted by the leadership of then-president Rune Hansen and in part motivated by pressure from the Norwegian consulate.

== See also ==
- Embassy of Norway, Washington, D.C.
- Knut Hovden
- List of gentlemen’s clubs in the United States
- Membership discrimination in California clubs
- Norwegian Americans
- Norwegian-American Historical Association
- Sons of Norway
