= Frank E. Booth =

Cannery owner, California. (1863–1940)

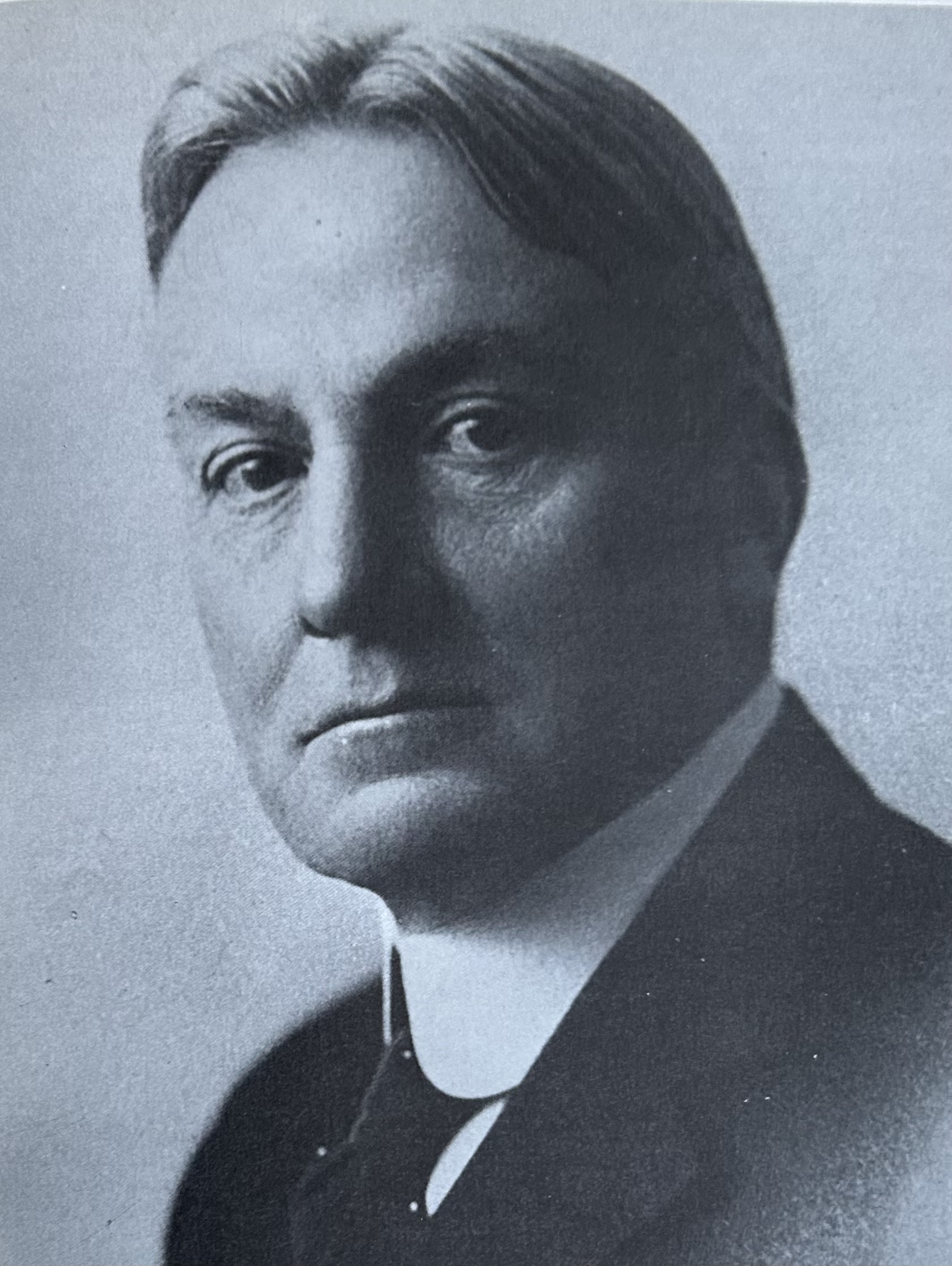
Frank Booth, c. 1910

Frank E. Booth, known as "Father of the Modern Sardine Industry" established the first sardine cannery in Monterey, California. Born in Dubuque, Iowa, Booth moved to San Francisco during his childhood. He began working in his family's business, Sacramento River Packers in 1881. Booth became company president in 1889 after his father died. He made an initial, failed attempt to can salmon in Monterey in 1897, but returned in 1902 and founded the Monterey Packing Company. He soon recognized Monterey Bay's abundant sardine supply as a new source of business. After a fire destroyed his cannery in 1903, Booth rebuilt and expanded the cannery and renamed it the F.E. Booth Company. When he later combined the expertise of Sicilian fishermen with innovative processing methods developed by his engineer, Knut Hovden, his sardine cannery thrived. Montery's sardine industry saw rapid growth during World War I and World War II, but declined in the late 1940s. Booth's sixty-year career in the canning industry—spanning the Sacramento River area, Monterey, and Centerville—helped make the F.E. Booth Company one of California's biggest canning businesses.

== Sacramento River ==
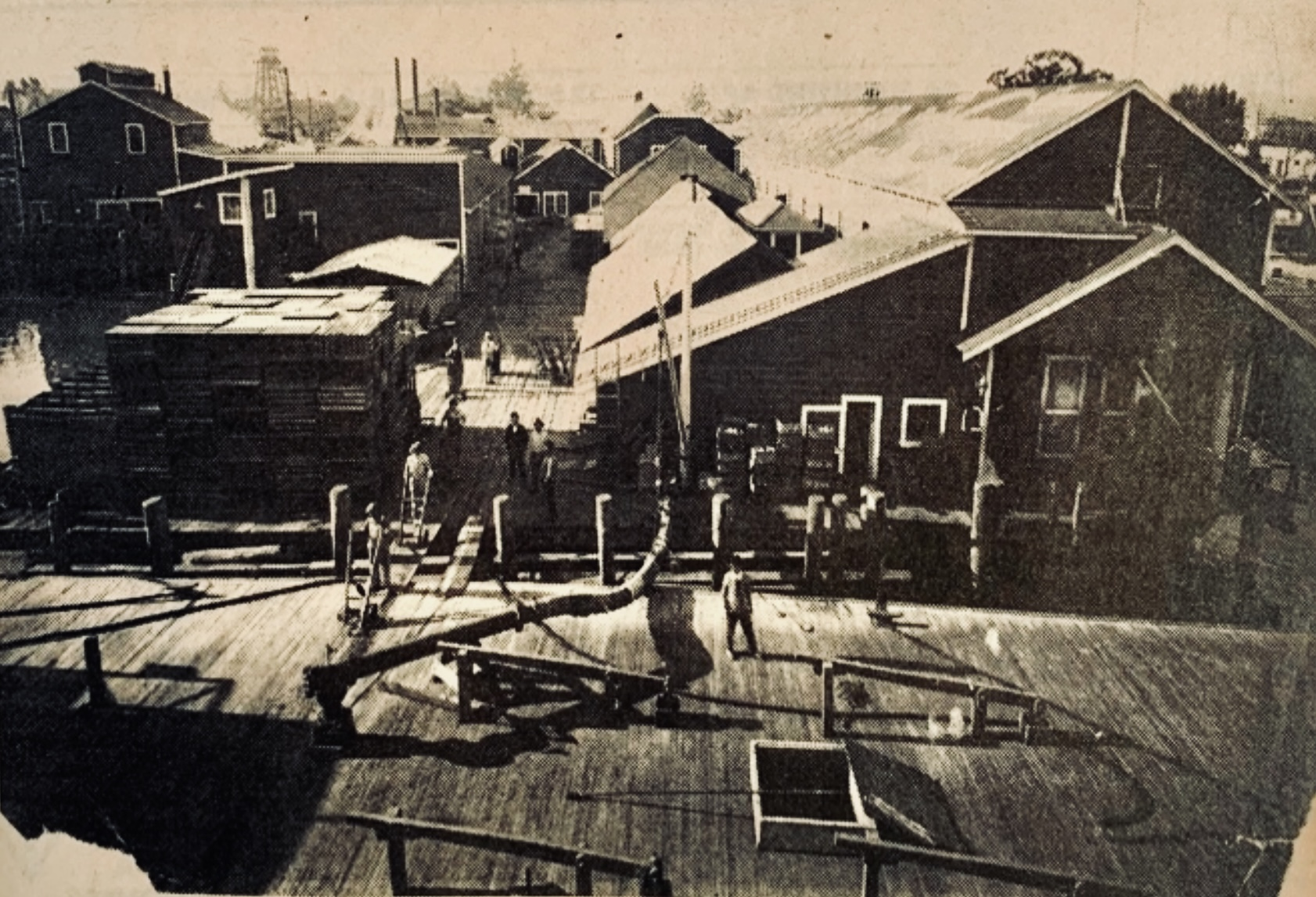
Booth cannery, Sacramento River

Born in Dubuque, Iowa in 1863, Frank E. Booth moved to San Francisco, California with his family as a child. He began working in his family's salmon packing business—Sacramento River Packers in Black Diamond—in 1881, when he was 18 years old. Following his father's death in 1889, the 26-year-old Booth was named president of the company. In 1905, Booth bought out his Sacramento River partners and became the sole owner of the company, renaming it the F.E. Booth Cannery. Booth began processing fruits and vegetables that were grown in the nearby farm areas. In 1909, the cannery employed 400 cannery workers. By 1925, Booth was purchasing the catch of fish from 150 local fishermen. The plant smoked shad and salmon for shipment to markets in New York City and Europe. Booth owned the first steamship on the Sacramento Delta, the Napa City, which transported fruits and vegetables to his cannery from growers at sevarl ports on the river. He worked with local growers and fisherman over the years and built one of the largest canning businesses in California.

== Monterey ==
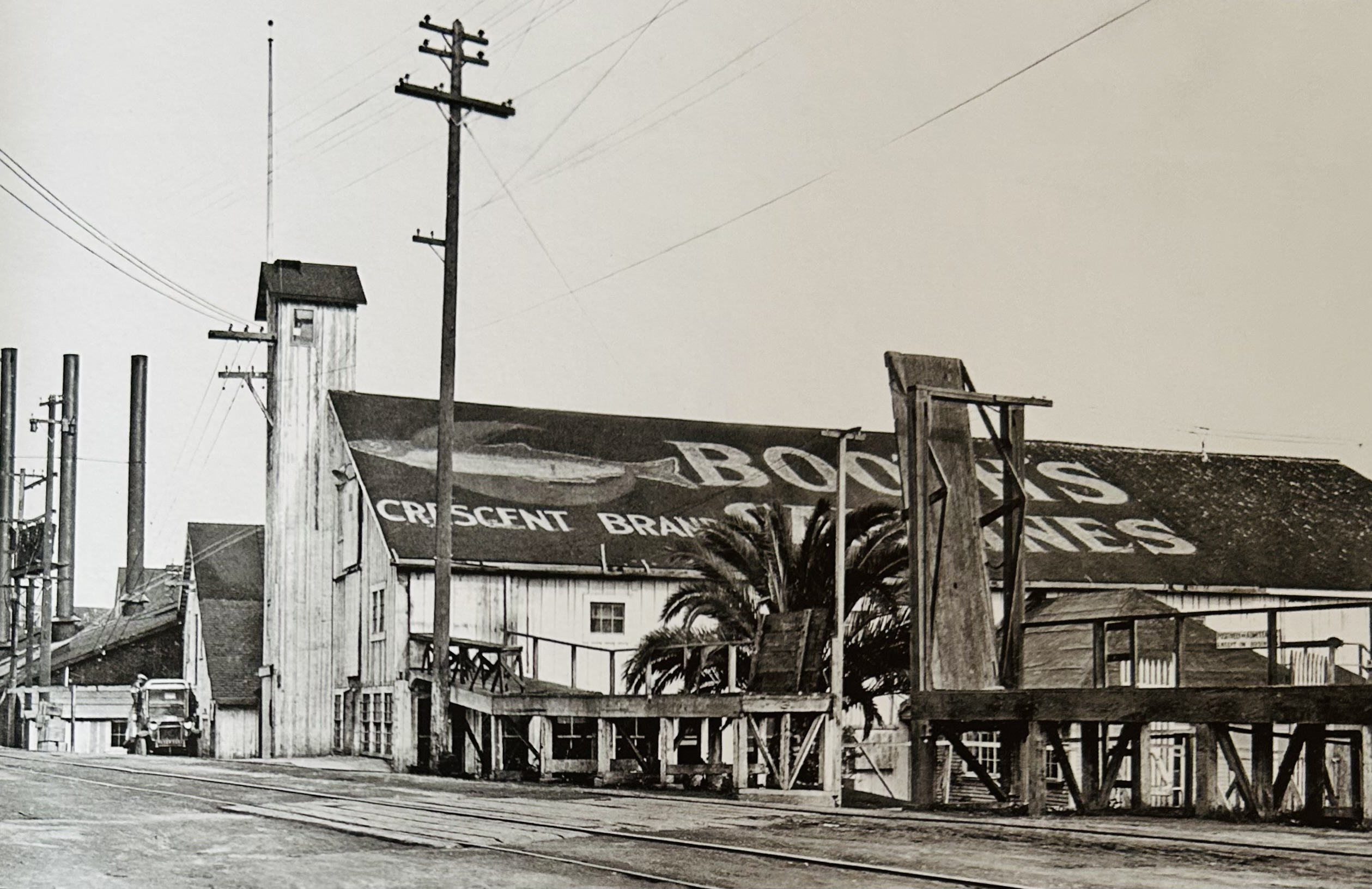
Booth Cannery, Monterey, c. 1920

During the 1890s, Booth identified Monterey Bay as a reliable source of salmon to supply his cannery. He built a small, experimental packing shed on Fisherman's Wharf in Monterey in 1897. His business failed because local fishermen chose to do business with San Francisco buyers offering higher prices. In 1902, Booth returned, purchased a failed cannery and opened the Monterey Packing Company near Fisherman's Wharf. Initially canning salmon, the plant soon started processing sardines. When a fire in 1903 destroyed Booth's cannery, he bought a failing cannery nearby and expanded the size of his plant. This was the beginning of Monterey's sardine industry. During the next two years, all processing was done by hand.

Fish processing became more efficient in 1905 after Booth hired Knut Hovden, a Norwegian fisheries engineer. Hovden's innovations transformed every stage of the canning process, from live fish to sardine cans. Hovden's labor-saving improvements dramatically increased production at the cannery. With the cannery able to handle more sardines, Hovden set out to boost the fish supply. Pietro Ferrante, a Sicilian fisherman who worked for Booth recommended a different net from the gill nets being used locally at the time. The lampara net was introduced in 1906 and by next season, local fishermen were able to provide Monterey canneries with the over four million pounds of sardines. By 1913, the lampara net was used by nearly all the local fishing boats. Booth's early sardine canning efforts gave rise to California's sardine industry by combining the skill of Sicilian fishermen using lampara nets with Knut Hovden's new processing methods. In 1917, Booth built a reduction plant on Ocean View Avenue (later renamed Cannery Row) to process fish waste into the more profitable fertilizer product.

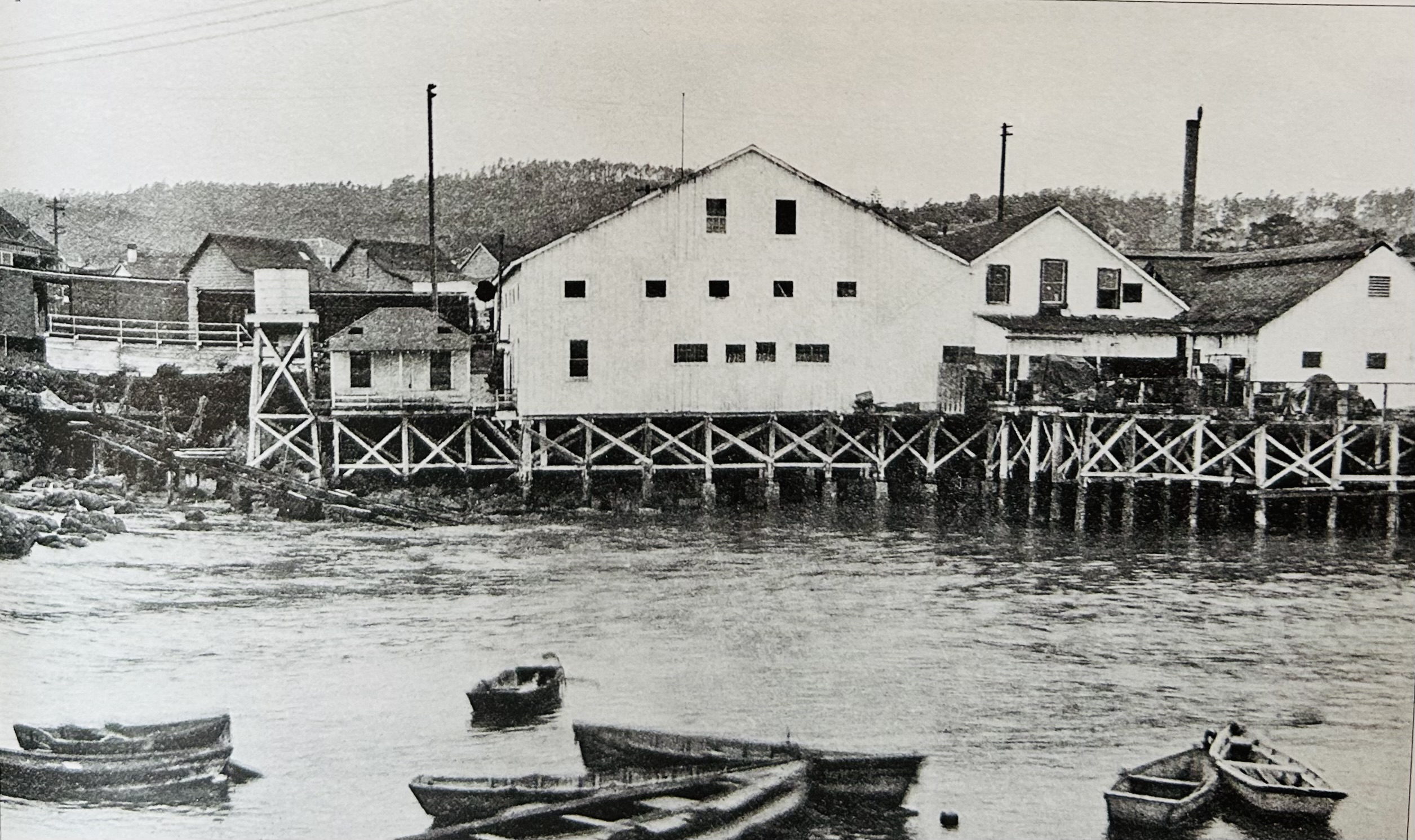
Fisherman's wharf view of Booth's cannery, c. 1920

During World War I, Monterey prospered as demand for canned goods surged. New canneries were built side-by-side along the beach to accommodate the U.S. government's demand for canned sardines. The term “Cannery Row” dates from this time period. Business slowed during the Great Depression, but picked up again during World War II. After the war, overfishing led to smaller sardine hauls and closure of several canneries. In 1941, the Monterey city council ended Booth Cannery's lease. The cannery closed in May, 1941 and was heavily damaged by fire before the building was to be demolished. In 1945, the Booth company sold the reduction plant to the Edgewater Packing Company The plant was closed by 1962.

=== Centerville ===
In 1917, Booth opened the F.E. Booth cannery near Centerville (now Fremont, California). The cannery processed locally grown fruits and vegetables, including peaches pears, cherries, apricots, peas, tomatoes and berries. By 1923, the Booth cannery was the last remaining cannery in the area. During the 1930s, the cannery was still operational, canning tomatoes.

== Later years ==
Booth later established a canned goods brokerage business in San Francisco, which became the F.E. Booth Company, Inc. one of the largest canning companies in the state of California. He died after a long illness in San Francisco on December 15, 1941.

== Sources ==
- Chiang, Connie Y. (2008). Shaping the Shoreline: Fisheries and Tourism on the Monterey Coast. Seattke: University of Washington Press. ISBN 978-0295988313.
- Hemp, Michael Kenneth (1986). Cannery Row: The History of Old Ocean Avenue. The History Company. ISBN 978-0941425001.
- Manglesdorf, Tom (1986). A History of Steinbeck's Cannery Row. Santa Cruz: Western Tanager Press.
- Walton, John (1997). "Chapter 8: Cannery Row: Class, Community and the Social Construction of History". In Hall, John R. (ed.). Reworking Class. Cornell University Press.
