= Pacific Biological Laboratories =

- U.S. National Register of Historic Places
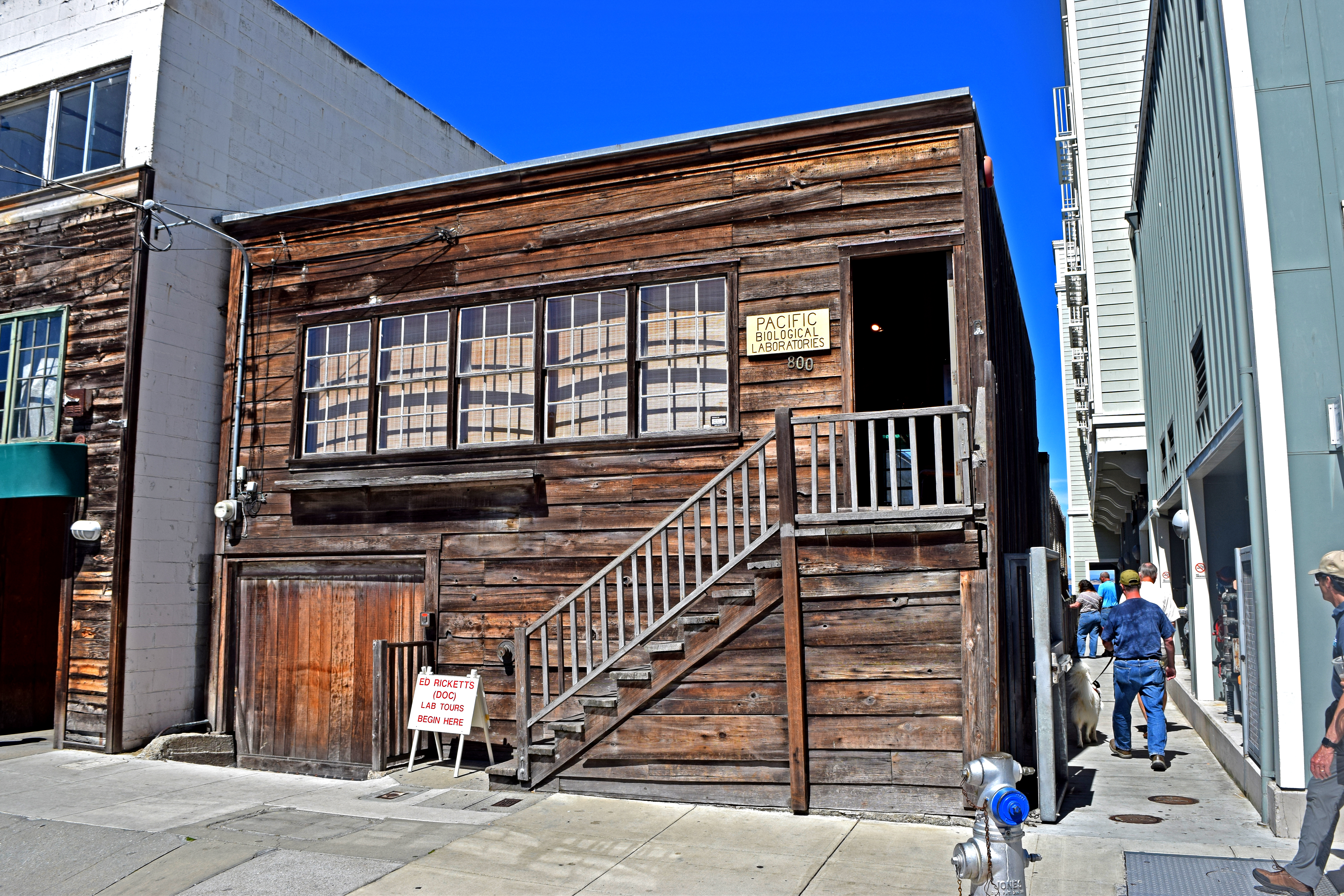
- The Pacific Biological Laboratories of Ed Ricketts, on Cannery Row, Monterey, California. Ed Ricketts’ Pacific Biological Laboratories logo

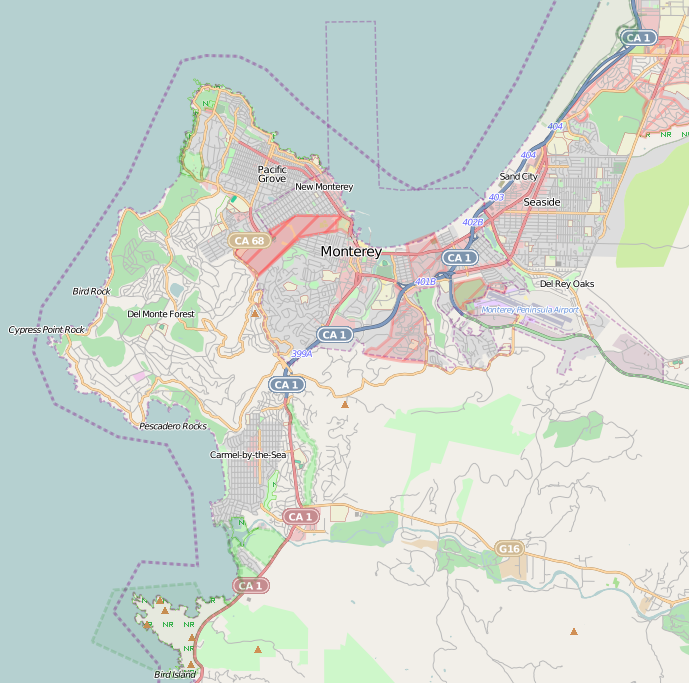
- Location within Monterey Peninsula
- Location: 800 Cannery Row, Monterey, California
- Coordinates: 36°37′1″N 121°53′59″W
- Area: less than one acre
- Built: 1937
- Architect: Oneweiler
- NRHP reference No.: 94001498
- Added to NRHP: December 29, 1994

Pacific Biological Laboratories, abbreviated PBL, was a biological supply house that sold preserved animals and prepared specimen microscope slides, many of which were of maritime aquatic species, to schools, museums, and research institutions. It was located in a building on what is now Monterey's Cannery Row on Monterey Bay in Monterey County, California.

The building, activities, and business were fictionalized as "Western Biological Laboratory" by John Steinbeck in his novel Cannery Row, as was a character based on one of its founders, Ed Ricketts. After a 1936 fire Steinbeck invested in the laboratory and owned half its stock.

== History ==
The company was started by Ed Ricketts with his college roommate and business partner Albert Galigher in 1923. Originally located in Pacific Grove at 165 Fountain Avenue, the lab was moved to 740 Ocean View Avenue, Monterey, California, around January, 1930, where Ricketts became sole owner. Today, that location is 800 Cannery Row. As a result of marital problems between Ricketts and his first wife Anna, the lab served as Ricketts's home for some time beginning in 1936.

On November 25, 1936, a fire broke out at the Del Mar Cannery next to the lab (site of today's Monterey Bay Aquarium) and most of the contents of the laboratory were destroyed. Ricketts’ manuscript for Between Pacific Tides survived the fire as it had already been sent to Stanford University for publication. It was Steinbeck who saved the lab financially after the fire with the purchase of half the company's stock.

The onset of World War II led to the decline of the commercial operation of the lab. However, specimens collected and distributed by PBL remain in the collections of Museums throughout the United States, including the Field Museum in Chicago, the Smithsonian Institution, the California Academy of Sciences, the American Museum of Natural History, the Museum of Comparative Zoology at Harvard University and the Museum of Zoology at Lund University in Sweden.

The lab became a meeting place for intellectuals, artists, and writers, including Bruce Ariss, Joseph Campbell, Henry Miller, John Steinbeck, Lincoln Steffens, and Francis Whitaker.

=== Catalog ===
Ricketts produced his first scientific publication, a catalog of marine biological specimens recorded in photographs and drawings. Originally meant for advertisement it may well have been the first record of Monterey Bay intertidal species.

== Preservation and legacy ==
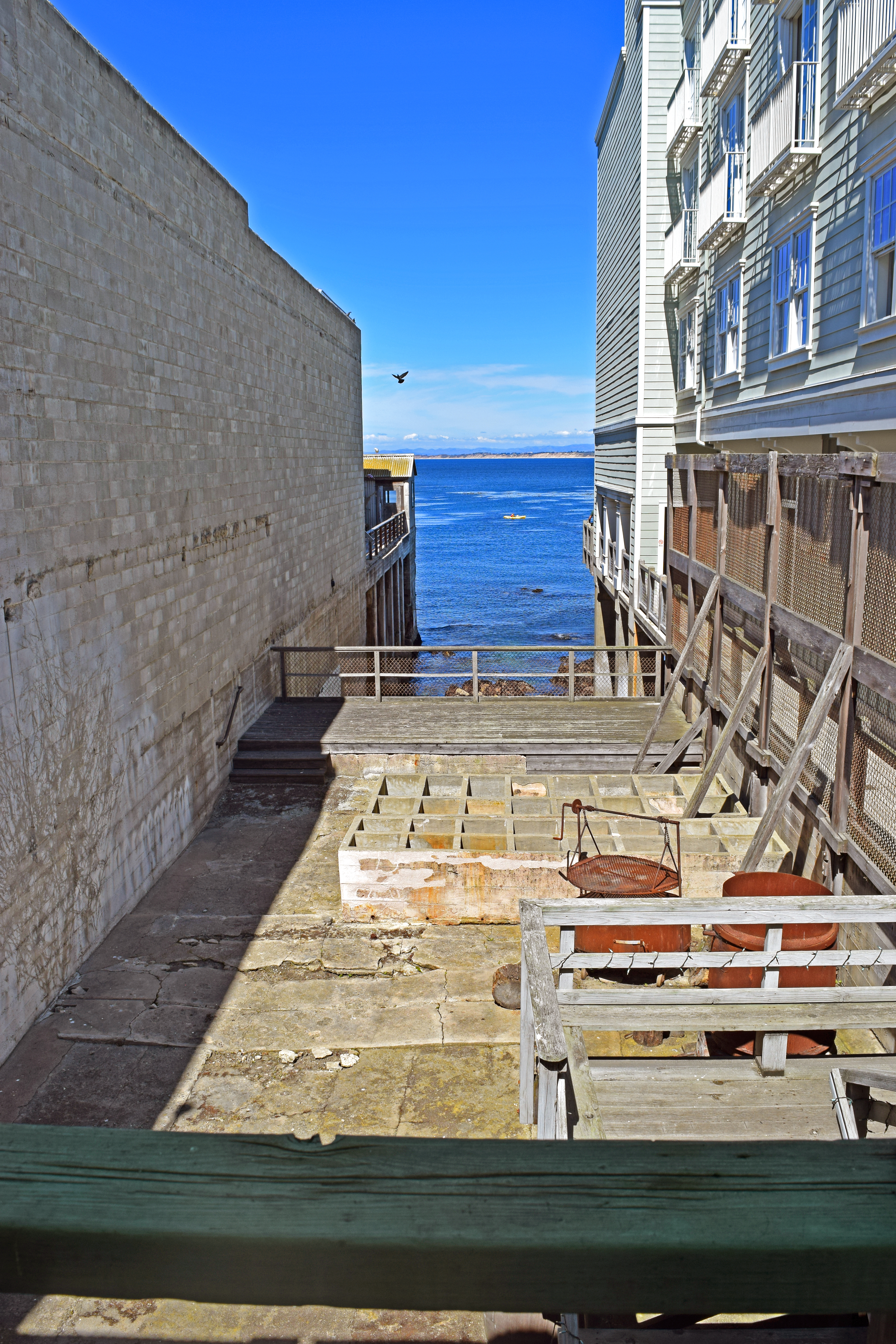
The back of the lab, with tanks for specimens

In 1949, a year after Ricketts's death, the Pacific Biological Laboratories building was sold to Yock Yee, a local grocer. High school literature teacher and jazz enthusiast Harlan Watkins began renting the Pacific Biological Laboratories building from Yock Yee and purchased it in 1956. In 1958, after Watkins had married and moved to Europe, friends of Watkins, including Frank Wright, Ed Haber, Joe Turner, Fred Fry and Ed Larsh, joined to purchase the building under the name “Pacific Biological Laboratories.” The building served as a weekly meeting place for club members, many of whom were prominent Monterey artists and writers. Founding club members also included nationally known cartoonists Hank Ketcham (creator of Dennis the Menace), Eldon Dedini and Gus Arriola. Several club members helped to start the Monterey Jazz Festival. The first festival was held in 1958.

The Pacific Biological Laboratories club sold their building to the City of Monterey in December 1993 for $170,000; they retained access to the building until 2015. A seismic rehabilitation of the building was done in 1998. It was restored by the Cannery Row Foundation which was given the Governor's Award for Historic Preservation.

On May 14, 1997, the 100th anniversary of Ricketts' birth, a commemorative plaque was placed on the 165 Fountain Avenue location by the Pacific Grove Heritage Society and the Pacific Grove Museum of Natural History Association. The Pacific Biological Laboratories is on the National Register of Historic Places.

Monthly tours are offered through the City of Monterey.
