= Conservatory =

Conservatory may refer to:

- Conservatory (greenhouse), a substantial building or room where plants are cultivated, including medicinal ones and including attached residential solariums
- Music school, or a school devoted to other arts such as dance
- Sunroom, a smaller glass enclosure or garden shed attached to a house, also called a conservatory
