= Hovden Cannery =

Cannery in Monterey, California, U.S.

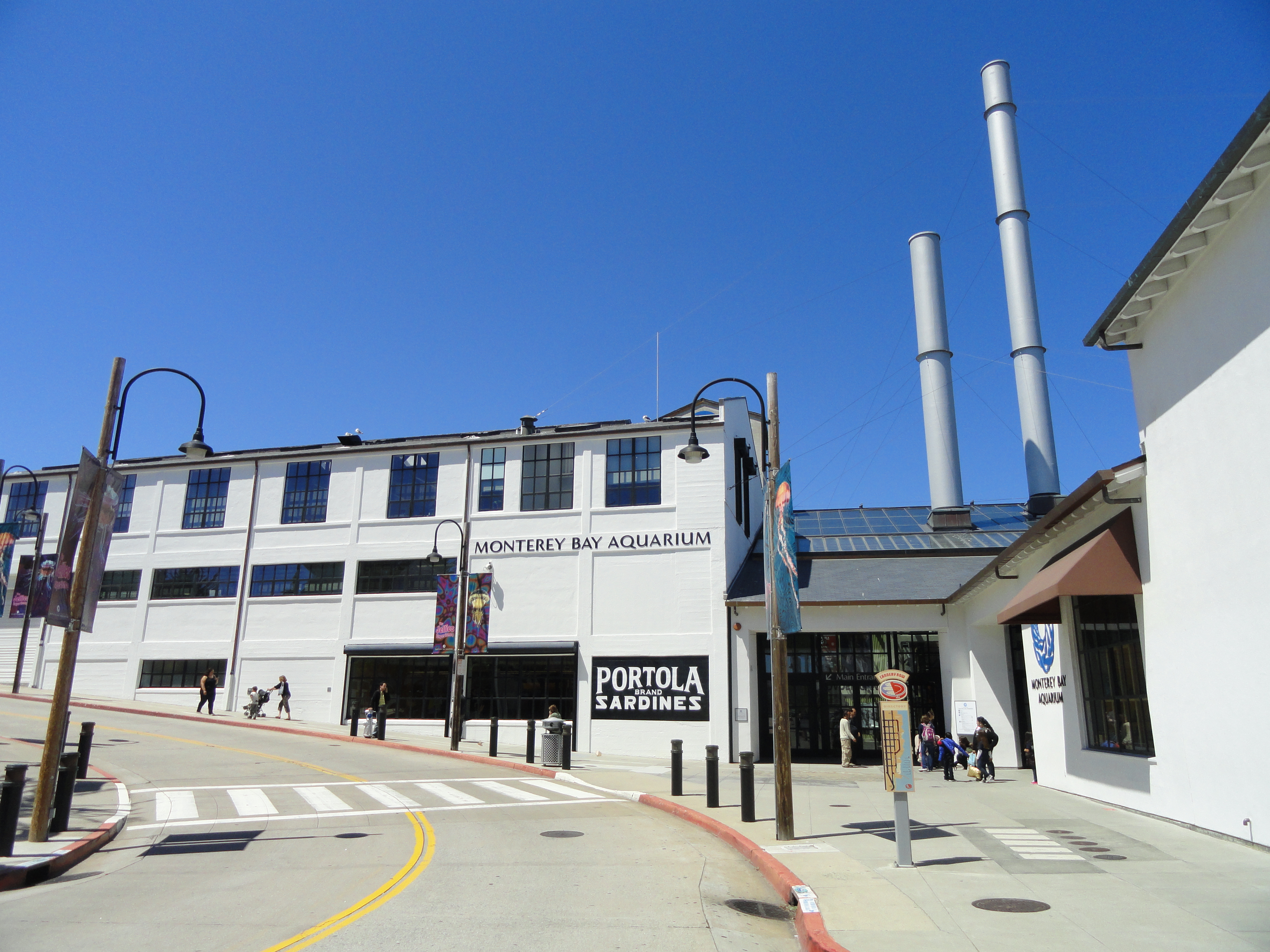
Entrance to the Monterey Bay Aquarium, located in the former Hovden Cannery building

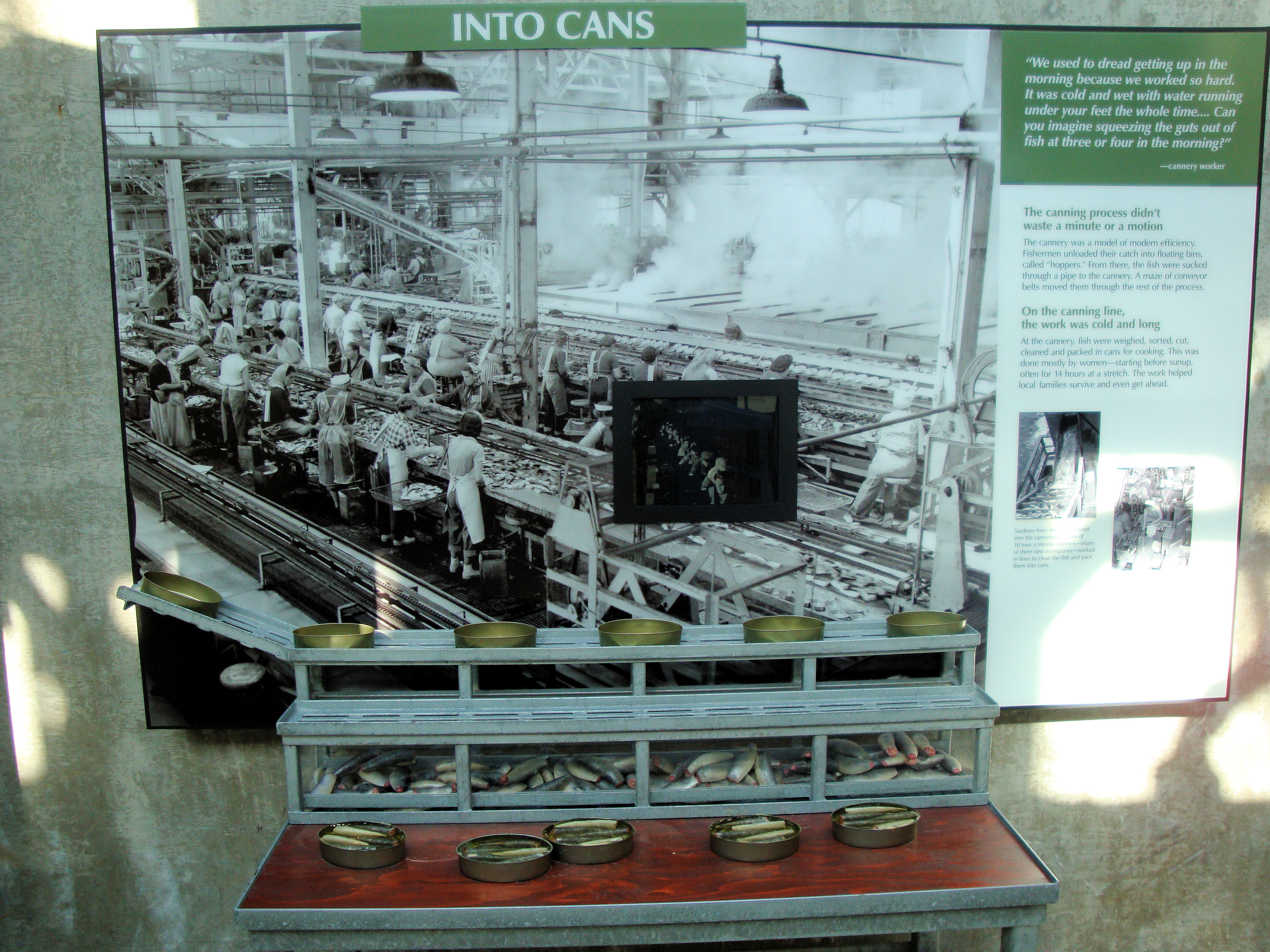
Hovden Cannery display in the Monterey Aquarium

The Hovden Cannery in Cannery Row, Monterey, California, was among the oldest, largest canneries of the Pacific Sardine Fishery. In the first half of the 20th century, it marked one of the most lucrative national fisheries. It was a source for literary inspiration in the works of John Steinbeck.

Hovden Cannery was founded in 1916 by Knut Hovden, a leading innovator in canning technology, and closed in 1973 after the collapse of the area fish population.

The former cannery building is now the site of the Monterey Bay Aquarium, which opened in 1984.
