= Exhibition Building =

Exhibition Building may refer to:

- Jubilee Exhibition Building, Adelaide, Australia
- Royal Exhibition Building, Melbourne, Australia

== See also ==
- Exhibition Stadium, Toronto, Canada
