= Knut Hovden =

Norwegian canner, innovator, and businessman

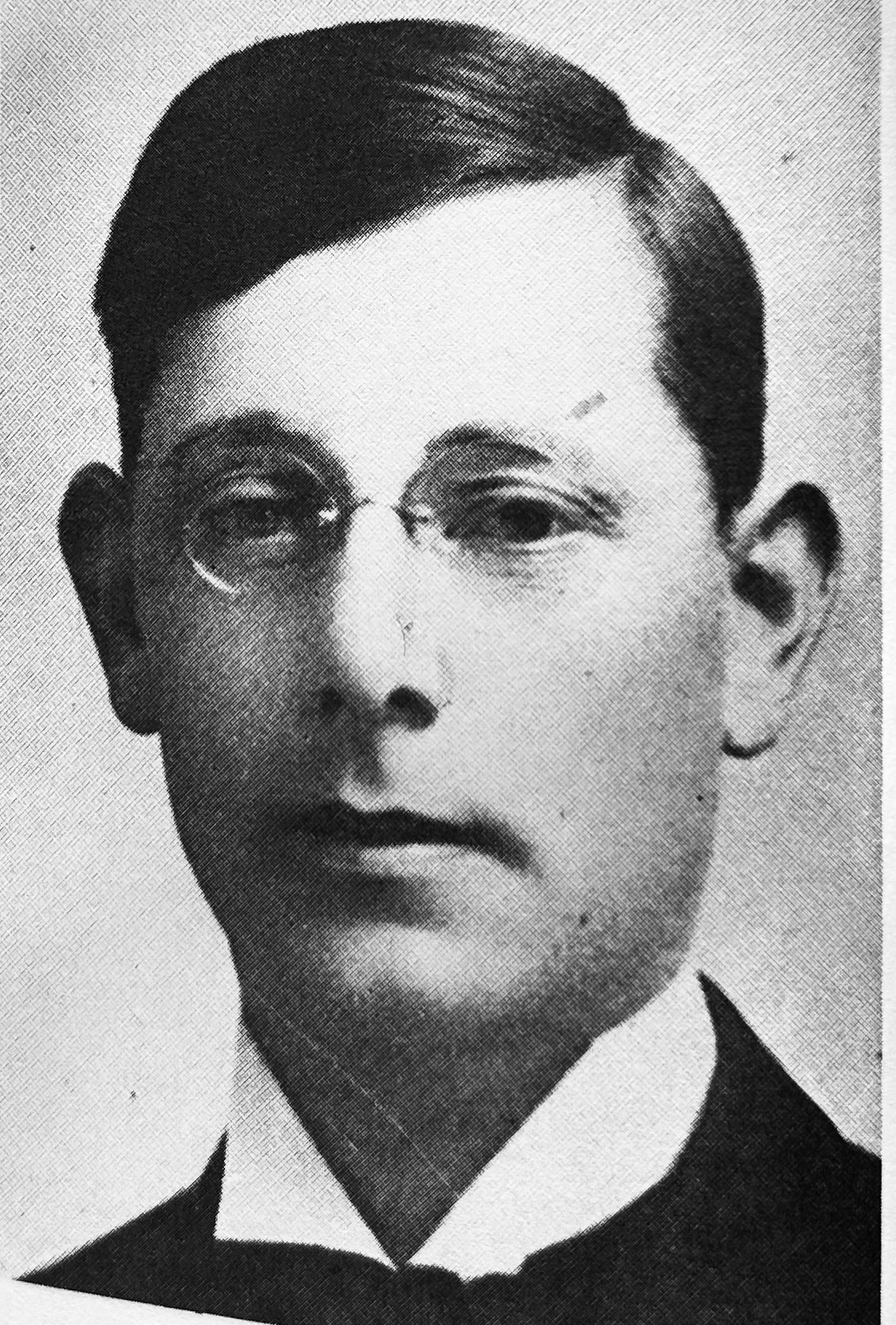
Knut Hovden, c. 1900

Knut Hovden (January 3, 1880 – March 3, 1961) was a Norwegian canner, innovator, and businessman.

Hovden received his education in Norway, specializing in the fisheries industry. He started his career working for the pioneer canner Frank E. Booth in Monterey, California in 1905. In 1916, he started his own cannery, Hovden Canning Co (later known as K.Hovden Company), which became the most successful cannery in Monterey in the heyday of the sardine industry. Hovden also ran other canneries along the West Coast and was widely recognised as the "King of Cannery Row".

Hovden modernized California's sardine industry. His innovation pervaded every stage of the canning process, from live fish to tin of sardines. Hovden developed the first mechanical dryer on the West Coast, eliminating the need to air-dry sardines, and the mechanical cooker, which used a chain-driven conveyor to move fish through vats of frying oil. In 1910, he introduced two soldering machines to seal the lids on the cans. By 1913, he and his brother, Ole Hovden, also began experimenting with a sardine cutting machine, which they perfected in 1918. Amongst Hovden's most influential innovation was also the fish hopper, a seabed connected to the canneries by underwater steel pipes, which literally sucked the sardines into the cannery for processing and storage. The innovation enabled the fishermen to unload the fish off shore.

Monterey Bay Aquarium is now on the site of Hovden's cannery. As a board member of the Pacific Grove Museum, Hovden was one of the first to champion the idea of an aquarium on the Monterey Peninsula already in the 1920s.
